= Guy Hunt (golfer) =

English professional golfer

Personal information
- Full name: Guy Lewis Hunt
- Nationality: England
- Born: 17 January 1947 (age 79) Bishop's Stortford, Herts.
- Height: 5 ft 6 in (1.68 m)

Career
- Sport: Golf
- Turned professional: 1963
- Former tours: European Tour; European Seniors Tour
- Professional wins: 3

Number of wins by tour
- European Tour: 1
- Other: 2

Best results in major championships
- Masters Tournament: CUT: 1973
- PGA Championship: DNP
- U.S. Open: DNP
- The Open Championship: T7: 1972

Guy Lewis Hunt (born 17 January 1947) is an English professional golfer. He won the 1977 Dunlop Masters and played in the 1975 Ryder Cup.

== Career ==
In 1963, Hunt turned professional as a sixteen-year-old. He became an assistant at Bishop's Stortford Golf Club. He had some success in 1968, winning the Southern Professional Championship and then Lord Derby’s Under-23 Professional Tournament by 8 strokes. In 1969, he was runner-up in the Energen Junior Match Play, losing 2 & 1 to Craig Defoy in the final. In 1971, he was runner-up to John Garner in the Coca-Cola Young Professionals' Championship.

Hunt played regularly on the European Tour from its foundation in 1972 until 1979. He had an exceptionally consistent season in 1972. He didn't win but was runner-up to Tommy Horton in the Piccadilly Medal, was third three times and had a total of eleven top-ten finishes including being tied for 7th place in the Open Championship. Hunt finished second in the Order of Merit behind Peter Oosterhuis, who won the title with 1751 points, just ahead of Hunt on 1710, although his performances in the big money events put Oosterhuis well ahead as the leading money winner. In 1972 Hunt also made his first appearance in the World Cup, partnering Tony Jacklin in Melbourne in November.

Following his good 1972 season, Hunt received an invitation to play in the 1973 Masters Tournament where he missed the cut. On the 1973 European Tour he only had two top-10 finishes and dropped to 43rd in the Order of Merit. In 1974 Hunt finished 16th in the Order of Merit with a best finish of third in the Martini International.

In 1975 Hunt finished a 17th on the Order of Merit and played in the Ryder Cup. He had a good start to the season, finishing joint third in the Spanish Open and the Martini International. These results at the start of the season put Hunt in the top eight of the Ryder Cup points to gain an automatic place in team. The 1975 Ryder Cup was held at Laurel Valley Golf Club in September. Hunt played two pairs matches with Eamonn Darcy, halving one and losing the other, and lost to Tom Weiskopf in the singles. Hunt was selected for England in the World Cup that year, playing with Maurice Bembridge.

Hunt's sole European Tour win came at the 1977 Dunlop Masters, the final event of the season, where he beat Brian Barnes in a playoff, winning the first prize of £8,000. This prize money lifted Hunt to 12th in the Order of Merit.

Hunt later worked as a tournament administrator and he also played on the European Seniors Tour from 1997 to 1999. His best result was to finish in a tie for fifth place in the 1997 Shell Wentworth Senior Masters.

== Professional wins (3) ==
=== European Tour wins (1) ===
| No. | Date | Tournament | Winning score | Margin of victory | Runner-up |
|---|---|---|---|---|---|
| 1 | 1 Oct 1977 | Dunlop Masters | +7 (74-70-76-71=291) | Playoff | (Scotland) Brian Barnes |

European Tour playoff record (1–0)

| No. | Year | Tournament | Opponent | Result |
|---|---|---|---|---|
| 1 | 1977 | Dunlop Masters | (Scotland) Brian Barnes | Won with par on third extra hole |

=== Other wins (2) ===
- 1968 Southern Professional Championship, Lord Derby’s Under-23 Professional Tournament

== Results in major championships ==
| Tournament | 1967 | 1968 | 1969 | 1970 | 1971 | 1972 | 1973 | 1974 | 1975 | 1976 | 1977 | 1978 | 1979 |
|---|---|---|---|---|---|---|---|---|---|---|---|---|---|
| Masters Tournament | | | | | | | CUT | | | | | | |
| The Open Championship | CUT | | CUT | T48 | CUT | T7 | CUT | T39 | T28 | T32 | T15 | T17 | CUT |

Note: Hunt only played in the Masters Tournament and The Open Championship.

Top 10
Did not play

CUT = missed the half-way cut (3rd round cut in 1979 Open Championship)
"T" indicates a tie for a place

== Team appearances ==
- Ryder Cup (representing Great Britain & Ireland): 1975
- World Cup (representing England): 1972, 1975
- Double Diamond International (representing England): 1972 (winners), 1975, 1976 (winners)
- Sotogrande Match (representing Great Britain and Ireland): 1974 (winners)
