= 1977 European Tour =

Golf tour season

1977 European Tour season
- Duration: 6 April 1977 – 1 October 1977
- Number of official events: 22
- Most wins: (Spain) Seve Ballesteros (3)
- Order of Merit: (Spain) Seve Ballesteros
- Sir Henry Cotton Rookie of the Year: (England) Nick Faldo

The 1977 European Tour, titled as the 1977 PGA European Tournament Players' Division, was the sixth season of the European Tour, the main professional golf tour in Europe since its inaugural season in 1972.

== Changes for 1977 ==
There were several changes from the previous season, with the addition of the Callers of Newcastle and the Tournament Players Championship, which replaced the Piccadilly Medal. Two events not counting for the Order of Merit, the Phillip Morris Nations Cup and the Sumrie Better-Ball, originally pencilled in for May, were cancelled.

== Schedule ==
The following table lists official events during the 1977 season.

Date	Tournament	Host country	Purse (£)	Winner (Note: The number in brackets after each winner's name is the number of European Tour events they had won up to and including that tournament. This information is only shown for European Tour members and are inclusive of the three United States-based major championships which were included on the schedule for the first time in 1998, with earlier editions having retrospectively been recognised as official tour wins.)	Notes
9 Apr	Portuguese Open	Portugal	25,000	(Spain) Manuel Ramos (1)	
10 Apr	Masters Tournament	United States	US$280,477	(United States) Tom Watson (2)	Major championship (Note: Unofficial money event at the time, but retrospectively counted as an official win.)
16 Apr	Spanish Open	Spain	30,000	(Scotland) Bernard Gallacher (4)	
23 Apr	Madrid Open	Spain	21,500	(Spain) Antonio Garrido (2)	
1 May	Italian Open	Italy	25,000	(Spain) Ángel Gallardo (1)	
8 May	French Open	France	23,500	(Spain) Seve Ballesteros (2)	
14 May	Benson & Hedges International Open	England	40,000	(Spain) Antonio Garrido (3)	
21 May	Sun Alliance Match Play Championship	England	20,000	(South Africa) Hugh Baiocchi (4)	
28 May	Penfold PGA Championship	England	50,000	(Spain) Manuel Piñero (3)	
5 Jun	Kerrygold International	Ireland	15,000	(Republic of Ireland) Liam Higgins (1)	
11 Jun	Martini International	England	15,000	(Australia) Greg Norman (1)	
19 Jun	Greater Manchester Open	England	20,000	(Republic of Ireland) Eamonn Darcy (1)	
19 Jun	U.S. Open	United States	US$200,000	(United States) Hubert Green (n/a)	Major championship
25 Jun	Uniroyal International Championship	England	30,000	(Spain) Seve Ballesteros (3)	
9 Jul	The Open Championship	Scotland	100,000	(United States) Tom Watson (3)	Major championship
17 Jul	Swiss Open	Switzerland	35,000	(Spain) Seve Ballesteros (4)	
24 Jul	Scandinavian Enterprise Open	Sweden	45,000	(United States) Bob Byman (1)	
31 Jul	Callers of Newcastle	England	25,000	(South Africa) John Fourie (1)	New tournament
7 Aug	German Open	West Germany	30,000	(South Africa) Tienie Britz (1)	
14 Aug	Dutch Open	Netherlands	30,000	(United States) Bob Byman (2)	
14 Aug	PGA Championship	United States	US$250,000	(United States) Lanny Wadkins (n/a)	Major championship
17 Aug	Skol Lager Individual	Scotland	20,000	(England) Nick Faldo (1)	
28 Aug	Carroll's Irish Open	Ireland	40,000	(United States) Hubert Green (n/a)	
10 Sep	Tournament Players Championship	England	40,000	(England) Neil Coles (6)	New tournament
1 Oct	Dunlop Masters	England	40,000	(England) Guy Hunt (1)	

=== Unofficial events ===
The following events were sanctioned by the European Tour, but did not carry official money, nor were wins official.

Date	Tournament	Host country	Purse (£)	Winner(s)	Notes
2 Jul	Phillip Morris Nations Cup	France	–	Cancelled	Team event
20 Aug	Double Diamond International	Scotland	25,000	Team USA	Team event
17 Sep	Ryder Cup	England	n/a	Team USA	Team event
8 Oct	Colgate World Match Play Championship	England	130,000	(Australia) Graham Marsh	Limited-field event
16 Oct	Trophée Lancôme	France	50,000	(Australia) Graham Marsh	
11 Dec	World Cup	Philippines	US$4,200	(Spain) Seve Ballesteros and (Spain) Antonio Garrido	Team event
11 Dec	World Cup Individual Trophy	Philippines	US$2,100	(South Africa) Gary Player	

== Order of Merit ==
The Order of Merit was based on tournament results during the season, calculated using a points-based system.

Position	Player	Points	Prize money (£)
1	(Spain) Seve Ballesteros	28,699	46,436
2	(South Africa) Hugh Baiocchi	24,159	32,251
3	(Spain) Antonio Garrido	19,728	21,581
4	(Spain) Manuel Piñero	19,173	26,569
5	(United States) Bob Byman	18,959	19,452
6	(Scotland) Brian Barnes	16,344	17,557
7	(England) Peter Dawson	15,941	17,583
8	(England) Nick Faldo	14,752	23,978
9	(Spain) Francisco Abreu	13,019	13,293
10	(Spain) Ángel Gallardo	12,975	14,765

== Awards ==
Award	Winner	Ref.
Sir Henry Cotton Rookie of the Year	(England) Nick Faldo	
