= 1975 European Tour =

Golf tour season

1975 European Tour season
- Duration: 8 April 1975 – 19 October 1975
- Number of official events: 19
- Most wins: (United States) George Burns (2) (Note: Jack Nicklaus and Arnold Palmer also won two events, but were not European Tour members.) (Australia) Bob Shearer (2)
- Order of Merit: (South Africa) Dale Hayes

The 1975 European Tour, titled as the 1975 PGA Tournament Players' Section, was the fourth season of the European Tour, the main professional golf tour in Europe since its inaugural season in 1972.

== Changes for 1975 ==
There were several changes from the previous season, with the addition of the Carroll's Irish Open, which replaced the Carroll's International and the Kerrygold International Classic; and the loss of the Penfold Tournament, the W.D. & H.O. Wills Tournament and the El Paraiso Open. Following the withdrawal of sponsors, Lord Derby's Young Professionals' Tournament and the Coca-Cola Young Professionals' Championship were also lost from the schedule, the PGA ultimately decided to sponsor an under-25's event themselves.

== Schedule ==
The following table lists official events during the 1975 season.

Date	Tournament	Host country	Purse (£)	Winner (Note: The number in brackets after each winner's name is the number of European Tour events they had won up to and including that tournament. This information is only shown for European Tour members and are inclusive of the three United States-based major championships which were included on the schedule for the first time in 1998, with earlier editions having retrospectively been recognised as official tour wins.)	Notes
11 Apr	Portuguese Open	Portugal	15,000	(United States) Hal Underwood (1)	
13 Apr	Masters Tournament	United States	US$242,750	(United States) Jack Nicklaus (n/a)	Major championship (Note: Unofficial money event at the time, but retrospectively counted as an official win.)
19 Apr	Spanish Open	Spain	30,000	(United States) Arnold Palmer (n/a)	
26 Apr	Madrid Open	Spain	18,000	(Australia) Bob Shearer (1)	
4 May	French Open	France	18,610	(Scotland) Brian Barnes (3)	
10 May	Piccadilly Medal	England	15,000	(Australia) Bob Shearer (2)	
26 May	Penfold PGA Championship	England	50,000	(United States) Arnold Palmer (n/a)	
14 Jun	Martini International	England	12,000	(Republic of Ireland) Christy O'Connor Jnr (1) (Australia) Ian Stanley (1)	Title shared
23 Jun	U.S. Open	United States	US$236,200	(United States) Lou Graham (n/a)	Major championship
12 Jul	The Open Championship	Scotland	75,000	(United States) Tom Watson (1)	Major championship
20 Jul	Swiss Open	Switzerland	25,000	(South Africa) Dale Hayes (1)	
27 Jul	Scandinavian Enterprise Open	Sweden	32,500	(United States) George Burns (1)	
3 Aug	German Open	West Germany	15,000	(England) Maurice Bembridge (5)	
10 Aug	Dutch Open	Netherlands	17,500	(South Africa) Hugh Baiocchi (2)	
10 Aug	PGA Championship	United States	US$225,000	(United States) Jack Nicklaus (n/a)	Major championship
16 Aug	Benson & Hedges Festival of Golf	England	25,000	(Argentina) Vicente Fernández (1)	
31 Aug	Carroll's Irish Open	Ireland	25,000	(Republic of Ireland) Christy O'Connor Jnr (2)	New to European Tour
6 Sep	Sun Alliance Match Play Championship	England	20,000	(Northern Ireland) Eddie Polland (2)	
14 Sep	Kerrygold International Classic	Ireland	10,000	(United States) George Burns (2)	New tournament
24 Sep	Double Diamond Strokeplay	Scotland	10,000	(England) Peter Dawson (1)	
4 Oct	Dunlop Masters	England	20,000	(Scotland) Bernard Gallacher (3)	
19 Oct	Italian Open	Italy	20,000	(United States) Billy Casper (n/a)	

=== Unofficial events ===
The following events were sanctioned by the European Tour, but did not carry official money, nor were wins official.

Date	Tournament	Host country	Purse (£)	Winner(s)	Notes
17 May	Sumrie-Bournemouth Better-Ball	England	12,000	(Australia) Jack Newton and (Republic of Ireland) John O'Leary	Team event
20 Sep	T.P.D. Young Professionals' Championship	England	5,000	(South Africa) Dale Hayes	
21 Sep	Ryder Cup	United States	n/a	Team USA	Team event
27 Sep	Double Diamond International	Scotland	15,000	The Americas	Team event
11 Oct	Piccadilly World Match Play Championship	England	30,000	(United States) Hale Irwin	Limited-field event
7 Dec	World Cup	Thailand	US$4,200	(United States) Lou Graham and (United States) Johnny Miller	Team event
7 Dec	World Cup Individual Trophy	Thailand	US$2,100	(United States) Johnny Miller	

== Order of Merit ==
The Order of Merit was based on tournament results during the season, calculated using a points-based system.

Position	Player	Points	Prize money (£)
1	(South Africa) Dale Hayes	17,488	20,508
2	(Australia) Bob Shearer	13,921	16,040
3	(Republic of Ireland) Eamonn Darcy	11,988	14,846
4	(Scotland) Brian Barnes	10,491	13,492
5	(Scotland) Bernard Gallacher	9,996	12,040
6	(South Africa) Hugh Baiocchi	9,064	9,631
7	(Republic of Ireland) Christy O'Connor Jnr	8,690	11,979
8	(Australia) Jack Newton	8,632	16,394
9	(Argentina) Vicente Fernández	8,264	10,109
10	(England) Neil Coles	8,238	11,770
