= 1977 PGA Tour =

Golf tour season

1977 PGA Tour season
- Duration: January 6, 1977 – November 6, 1977
- Number of official events: 45
- Most wins: (United States) Tom Watson (5)
- Money list: (United States) Tom Watson
- PGA Player of the Year: (United States) Tom Watson

The 1977 PGA Tour was the 62nd season of the PGA Tour, the main professional golf tour in the United States. It was also the ninth season since separating from the PGA of America.

== Schedule ==
The following table lists official events during the 1977 season.

Date	Tournament	Location	Purse (US$)	Winner(s) (Note: The number in parentheses after each winner's name is the number of PGA Tour events they had won up to and including that tournament. This information is only shown for PGA Tour members.)	Notes
Jan 9	Phoenix Open	Arizona	200,000	(United States) Jerry Pate (3)	
Jan 16	Joe Garagiola-Tucson Open	Arizona	200,000	(United States) Bruce Lietzke (1)	
Jan 23	Bing Crosby National Pro-Am	California	200,000	(United States) Tom Watson (4)	Pro-Am
Jan 30	Andy Williams-San Diego Open Invitational	California	180,000	(United States) Tom Watson (5)	
Feb 6	Hawaiian Open	Hawaii	240,000	(United States) Bruce Lietzke (2)	
Feb 13	Bob Hope Desert Classic	California	200,000	(United States) Rik Massengale (3)	Pro-Am
Feb 20	Glen Campbell-Los Angeles Open	California	200,000	(United States) Tom Purtzer (1)	
Feb 27	Jackie Gleason-Inverrary Classic	Florida	250,000	(United States) Jack Nicklaus (62)	
Mar 7	Florida Citrus Open	Florida	200,000	(United States) Gary Koch (2)	
Mar 13	Doral-Eastern Open	Florida	200,000	(United States) Andy Bean (1)	
Mar 20	Tournament Players Championship	Florida	300,000	(United States) Mark Hayes (3)	Special event
Mar 27	Heritage Classic	South Carolina	225,000	(Australia) Graham Marsh (1)	Invitational
Apr 3	Greater Greensboro Open	North Carolina	235,000	(United States) Danny Edwards (1)	
Apr 10	Masters Tournament	Georgia	280,477	(United States) Tom Watson (6)	Major championship
Apr 10	Magnolia Classic	Mississippi	35,000	(United States) Mike McCullough (n/a)	Second Tour (Note: Official money; unofficial win.)
Apr 17	MONY Tournament of Champions	California	225,000	(United States) Jack Nicklaus (63)	Winners-only event
Apr 17	Tallahassee Open	Florida	80,000	(United States) Ed Sneed (3)	Alternate event
Apr 24	First NBC New Orleans Open	Louisiana	175,000	(United States) Jim Simons (1)	
May 1	Houston Open	Texas	200,000	(United States) Gene Littler (29)	
May 8	Byron Nelson Golf Classic	Texas	200,000	(United States) Raymond Floyd (9)	
May 15	Colonial National Invitation	Texas	200,000	(United States) Ben Crenshaw (5)	Invitational
May 15	Oklahoma City Open	Oklahoma	45,000	(United States) Tom Storey (n/a)	Second Tour
May 23	Memorial Tournament	Ohio	225,000	(United States) Jack Nicklaus (64)	Invitational
May 29	Atlanta Classic	Georgia	200,000	(United States) Hale Irwin (8)	
Jun 5	Kemper Open	North Carolina	250,000	(United States) Tom Weiskopf (13)	
Jun 12	Danny Thomas Memphis Classic	Tennessee	200,000	(United States) Al Geiberger (10)	
Jun 19	U.S. Open	Oklahoma	200,000	(United States) Hubert Green (12)	Major championship
Jun 26	Western Open	Illinois	200,000	(United States) Tom Watson (7)	
Jul 3	Greater Milwaukee Open	Wisconsin	130,000	(United States) Dave Eichelberger (2)	
Jul 9	The Open Championship	Scotland	£100,000	(United States) Tom Watson (8)	Major championship (Note: Unofficial money event at the time, but retrospectively counted as an official win.)
Jul 10	Ed McMahon-Jaycees Quad Cities Open	Illinois	125,000	(United States) Mike Morley (1)	Alternate event
Jul 17	Pleasant Valley Classic	Massachusetts	250,000	(United States) Raymond Floyd (10)	
Jul 24	Canadian Open	Canada	225,000	(United States) Lee Trevino (22)	
Jul 31	IVB-Philadelphia Golf Classic	Pennsylvania	200,000	(United States) Jerry McGee (2)	
Aug 7	Sammy Davis Jr.-Greater Hartford Open	Connecticut	210,000	(United States) Billy Kratzert (2)	
Aug 14	PGA Championship	California	250,000	(United States) Lanny Wadkins (4)	Major championship
Aug 21	American Express Westchester Classic	New York	300,000	(United States) Andy North (1)	
Aug 28	Colgate Hall of Fame Golf Classic	North Carolina	250,000	(United States) Hale Irwin (9)	
Sep 4	Buick Open	Michigan	100,000	(South Africa) Bobby Cole (1)	Alternate event
Sep 5	World Series of Golf	Ohio	300,000	(United States) Lanny Wadkins (5)	Limited-field event
Sep 11	B.C. Open	New York	200,000	(United States) Gil Morgan (1)	
Sep 25	Ohio Kings Island Open	Ohio	150,000	(United States) Mike Hill (3)	
Oct 2	Anheuser-Busch Golf Classic	California	200,000	(United States) Miller Barber (10)	
Oct 16	San Antonio Texas Open	Texas	150,000	(United States) Hale Irwin (10)	
Oct 23	Southern Open	Georgia	125,000	(United States) Jerry Pate (4)	
Oct 30	Pensacola Open	Florida	125,000	(United States) Leonard Thompson (2)	
Nov 6	Walt Disney World National Team Championship	Florida	200,000	(United States) Gibby Gilbert (3) and (United States) Grier Jones (3)	Team event

=== Unofficial events ===
The following events were sanctioned by the PGA Tour, but did not carry official money, nor were wins official.

Date	Tournament	Location	Purse ($)	Winner(s)	Notes
Sep 17	Ryder Cup	England	n/a	Team USA	Team event
Dec 11	World Cup	Philippines	4,200	(Spain) Seve Ballesteros and (Spain) Antonio Garrido	Team event
Dec 11	World Cup Individual Trophy	Philippines	2,100	(South Africa) Gary Player	

== Money list ==
The money list was based on prize money won during the season, calculated in U.S. dollars.

Position	Player	Prize money ($)
1	(United States) Tom Watson	310,653
2	(United States) Jack Nicklaus	284,509
3	(United States) Lanny Wadkins	244,882
4	(United States) Hale Irwin	221,456
5	(United States) Bruce Lietzke	202,156
6	(United States) Tom Weiskopf	197,369
7	(United States) Raymond Floyd	163,261
8	(United States) Miller Barber	148,320
9	(United States) Hubert Green	140,255
10	(United States) Billy Kratzert	134,758

== Awards ==
Award	Winner	Ref.
PGA Player of the Year	(United States) Tom Watson	
Scoring leader (Vardon Trophy)	(United States) Tom Watson	
