= 1975 PGA Tour =

Golf tour season

1975 PGA Tour season
- Duration: January 9, 1975 – October 26, 1975
- Number of official events: 42
- Most wins: (United States) Jack Nicklaus (5)
- Money list: (United States) Jack Nicklaus
- PGA Player of the Year: (United States) Jack Nicklaus

The 1975 PGA Tour was the 60th season of the PGA Tour, the main professional golf tour in the United States. It was also the seventh season since separating from the PGA of America.

== Schedule ==
The following table lists official events during the 1975 season.

| Date | Tournament | Location | Purse (US$) | Winner(s) (Note: The number in parentheses after each winner's name is the number of PGA Tour events they had won up to and including that tournament. This information is only shown for PGA Tour members.) | Notes |
|---|---|---|---|---|---|
| Jan 12 | Phoenix Open | Arizona | 150,000 | (United States) Johnny Miller (12) | |
| Jan 19 | Dean Martin Tucson Open | Arizona | 200,000 | (United States) Johnny Miller (13) | |
| Jan 26 | Bing Crosby National Pro-Am | California | 185,000 | (United States) Gene Littler (26) | Pro-Am |
| Feb 3 | Hawaiian Open | Hawaii | 220,000 | (United States) Gary Groh (1) | |
| Feb 9 | Bob Hope Desert Classic | California | 160,000 | (United States) Johnny Miller (14) | Pro-Am |
| Feb 16 | Andy Williams-San Diego Open Invitational | California | 170,000 | (United States) J. C. Snead (4) | |
| Feb 23 | Glen Campbell-Los Angeles Open | California | 150,000 | (United States) Pat Fitzsimons (1) | |
| Mar 2 | Jackie Gleason-Inverrary Classic | Florida | 260,000 | (United States) Bob Murphy (4) | |
| Mar 9 | Florida Citrus Open | Florida | 200,000 | (United States) Lee Trevino (20) | |
| Mar 16 | Doral-Eastern Open | Florida | 150,000 | (United States) Jack Nicklaus (55) | |
| Mar 23 | Greater Jacksonville Open | Florida | 150,000 | (United States) Larry Ziegler (2) | |
| Mar 30 | Sea Pines Heritage Classic | South Carolina | 200,000 | (United States) Jack Nicklaus (56) | Invitational |
| Apr 6 | Greater Greensboro Open | North Carolina | 225,000 | (United States) Tom Weiskopf (11) | |
| Apr 13 | Masters Tournament | Georgia | 242,750 | (United States) Jack Nicklaus (57) | Major championship |
| Apr 13 | Magnolia Classic | Mississippi | 35,000 | (United States) Bob Wynn (n/a) | Second Tour (Note: Official money; unofficial win.) |
| Apr 20 | Pensacola Open | Florida | 125,000 | (United States) Jerry McGee (1) | |
| Apr 27 | MONY Tournament of Champions | California | 200,000 | (United States) Al Geiberger (6) | Winners-only event |
| Apr 27 | Tallahassee Open | Florida | 60,000 | (United States) Rik Massengale (1) | Alternate event |
| May 4 | Houston Open | Texas | 150,000 | (Australia) Bruce Crampton (14) | |
| May 12 | Byron Nelson Golf Classic | Texas | 175,000 | (United States) Tom Watson (2) | |
| May 18 | First NBC New Orleans Open | Louisiana | 150,000 | (United States) Billy Casper (51) | |
| May 25 | Danny Thomas Memphis Classic | Tennessee | 175,000 | (United States) Gene Littler (27) | |
| Jun 1 | Atlanta Classic | Georgia | 225,000 | (United States) Hale Irwin (4) | |
| Jun 8 | Kemper Open | North Carolina | 250,000 | (United States) Raymond Floyd (6) | |
| Jun 16 | IVB-Philadelphia Golf Classic | Pennsylvania | 150,000 | (United States) Tom Jenkins (1) | |
| Jun 23 | U.S. Open | Illinois | 236,200 | (United States) Lou Graham (3) | Major championship |
| Jun 30 | Western Open | Illinois | 200,000 | (United States) Hale Irwin (5) | |
| Jul 6 | Greater Milwaukee Open | Wisconsin | 130,000 | (United States) Art Wall Jr. (14) | |
| Jul 13 | The Open Championship | Scotland | £75,000 | (United States) Tom Watson (3) | Major championship (Note: Unofficial money event at the time, but retrospectively counted as an official win.) |
| Jul 13 | Ed McMahon-Jaycees Quad Cities Open | Illinois | 75,000 | (United States) Roger Maltbie (1) | Alternate event |
| Jul 20 | Pleasant Valley Classic | Massachusetts | 200,000 | (United States) Roger Maltbie (2) | |
| Jul 27 | Canadian Open | Canada | 200,000 | (United States) Tom Weiskopf (12) | |
| Aug 3 | Westchester Classic | New York | 250,000 | (United States) Gene Littler (28) | |
| Aug 10 | PGA Championship | Ohio | 225,000 | (United States) Jack Nicklaus (58) | Major championship |
| Aug 17 | Sammy Davis Jr.-Greater Hartford Open | Connecticut | 200,000 | (United States) Don Bies (1) | |
| Aug 24 | Tournament Players Championship | Texas | 250,000 | (United States) Al Geiberger (7) | Special event |
| Sep 1 | B.C. Open | New York | 175,000 | (United States) Don Iverson (1) | |
| Sep 7 | Southern Open | Georgia | 100,000 | (United States) Hubert Green (8) | |
| Sep 14 | World Open Golf Championship | North Carolina | 200,000 | (United States) Jack Nicklaus (59) | |
| Sep 28 | Sahara Invitational | Nevada | 135,000 | (United States) Dave Hill (12) | |
| Oct 5 | Kaiser International Open Invitational | California | 175,000 | (United States) Johnny Miller (15) | |
| Oct 19 | San Antonio Texas Open | Texas | 125,000 | (United States) Don January (9) | |
| Oct 26 | Walt Disney World National Team Championship | Florida | 100,000 | (United States) Jim Colbert (5) and (United States) Dean Refram (2) | Team event |

=== Unofficial events ===
The following events were sanctioned by the PGA Tour, but did not carry official money, nor were wins official.

| Date | Tournament | Location | Purse ($) | Winner(s) | Notes |
|---|---|---|---|---|---|
| Jun 21 | Buick Open | Michigan | 21,000 | (United States) Spike Kelley | |
| Sep 21 | Ryder Cup | Pennsylvania | n/a | Team USA | Team event |
| Dec 7 | World Cup | Thailand | 4,200 | (United States) Lou Graham and (United States) Johnny Miller | Team event |
| Dec 7 | World Cup Individual Trophy | Thailand | 2,100 | (United States) Johnny Miller | |

== Money list ==
The money list was based on prize money won during the season, calculated in U.S. dollars.

| Position | Player | Prize money ($) |
|---|---|---|
| 1 | (United States) Jack Nicklaus | 298,149 |
| 2 | (United States) Johnny Miller | 226,118 |
| 3 | (United States) Tom Weiskopf | 219,140 |
| 4 | (United States) Hale Irwin | 205,380 |
| 5 | (United States) Gene Littler | 182,883 |
| 6 | (United States) Al Geiberger | 175,693 |
| 7 | (United States) Tom Watson | 153,795 |
| 8 | (United States) John Mahaffey | 141,471 |
| 9 | (United States) Lee Trevino | 134,206 |
| 10 | (Australia) Bruce Crampton | 132,532 |

== Awards ==
| Award | Winner | Ref. |
|---|---|---|
| PGA Player of the Year | (United States) Jack Nicklaus | |
| Scoring leader (Vardon Trophy) | (Australia) Bruce Crampton | |
