= 1975 World Cup =

1975 World Cup can refer to:

- 1975 Alpine Skiing World Cup
- 1975 Cricket World Cup
- 1975 Rugby League World Cup
- 1975 World Cup (men's golf)
