= 1972 Open Championship =

Coordinates: 56.043°N 2.823°W

Tournament information
- Dates: 12–15 July 1972
- Location: Gullane, Scotland
- Course: Muirfield Golf Links
- Tour(s): European Tour; PGA Tour

Statistics
- Par: 71
- Length: 6,892 yards (6,302 m)
- Field: 153 players 88 after 1st cut 64 after 2nd cut
- Cut: 152 (+10) (1st cut); 225 (+12) (2nd cut)
- Prize fund: £50,000 $125,000
- Winner's share: £5,500 $13,750

Champion
- (United States) Lee Trevino
- 278 (−6)

Location in Scotland
Location in East Lothian, Scotland

The 1972 Open Championship was the 101st Open Championship, held 12–15 July at Muirfield Golf Links in Gullane, East Lothian, Scotland. Lee Trevino won his second straight Claret Jug, the first to successfully defend his title since Arnold Palmer in 1962. Trevino finished one stroke ahead of runner-up Jack Nicklaus, ending his bid for the Grand Slam. Nicklaus had won the first two majors in 1972 and was the odds-on favorite at Muirfield, where he won his first Open in 1966. He also held the PGA Championship title from February 1971; a win at Muirfield and he would become the first to hold all four major titles at once.

Six strokes back at even-par after 54 holes, Nicklaus shot a final round 66 (−5) on Saturday to tie the course record, but played the final three holes at one-over par. Trevino had posted his own 66 in the third round and held on in the fourth round with an even-par 71, which included a chip-in for par at 17, to gain the fourth of his six major titles.

It was the third of four times that Nicklaus was a runner-up to Trevino in a major championship.

Trevino's win concluded a stretch where American-born golfers won eight consecutive major championships. This is the fourth-longest stretch in history for American-born golfers after stretches that ended at the 1930 Open Championship, 1947 U.S. Open, and the 1977 PGA Championship.

Thirty years later, Tiger Woods became the first since Nicklaus to win the first two major tournaments of the year. His bid for a Grand Slam in 2002 also ended at Muirfield.

== Round summaries ==
=== First round ===
Wednesday, 12 July 1972

| Place | Player | Score | To par |
|---|---|---|---|
| 1 | (England) Peter Tupling | 68 | −3 |
| 2 | (England) Tony Jacklin | 69 | −2 |
| T3 | (United States) Frank Beard | 70 | −1 |
| T3 | (Wales) Craig Defoy | 70 | −1 |
| T3 | (United States) Dave Marr | 70 | −1 |
| T3 | (United States) Jack Nicklaus | 70 | −1 |
| T3 | (England) Peter Townsend | 70 | −1 |
| T8 | (Scotland) Brian Barnes | 71 | E |
| T8 | (England) John Garner | 71 | E |
| T8 | (Spain) Antonio Garrido | 71 | E |
| T8 | (South Africa) Gary Player | 71 | E |
| T8 | (United States) Doug Sanders | 71 | E |
| T8 | (Australia) Peter Thomson | 71 | E |
| T8 | (United States) Lee Trevino | 71 | E |

=== Second round ===
Thursday, 13 July 1972

| Place | Player | Score | To par |
|---|---|---|---|
| T1 | (England) Tony Jacklin | 69-72=141 | −1 |
| T1 | (United States) Lee Trevino | 71-70=141 | −1 |
| T3 | (England) John Garner | 71-71=142 | E |
| T3 | (United States) Johnny Miller | 76-66=142 | E |
| T3 | (United States) Jack Nicklaus | 70-72=142 | E |
| T3 | (South Africa) Gary Player | 71-71=142 | E |
| T3 | (United States) Doug Sanders | 71-71=142 | E |
| T3 | (England) Peter Townsend | 70-72=142 | E |
| T3 | (England) Peter Tupling | 68-74=142 | E |
| T10 | (Scotland) Brian Barnes | 71-72=143 | +1 |
| T10 | (England) Clive Clark | 72-71=143 | +1 |
| T10 | (Australia) Peter Thomson | 71-72=143 | +1 |

Amateurs: R. Foster (+7), Mosey (+8), Revell (+9), Stephen (+9), Campbell (+11), Homer (+11), Gradwell (+13), Elson (+14), Bonallack (+15), Clark (+15), Berry (+19), Gray (+20).

=== Third round ===
Friday, 14 July 1972

| Place | Player | Score | To par |
|---|---|---|---|
| 1 | (United States) Lee Trevino | 71-70-66=207 | −6 |
| 2 | (England) Tony Jacklin | 69-72-67=208 | −5 |
| 3 | (United States) Doug Sanders | 71-71-69=211 | −2 |
| 4 | (Scotland) Brian Barnes | 71-72-69=212 | −1 |
| 5 | (United States) Jack Nicklaus | 70-72-71=213 | E |
| T6 | (England) Guy Hunt | 75-72-67=214 | +1 |
| T6 | (United States) Johnny Miller | 76-66-72=214 | +1 |
| T8 | (United States) Dave Marr | 70-74-71=215 | +2 |
| T8 | (United States) Arnold Palmer | 73-73-69=215 | +2 |
| T8 | (England) Peter Tupling | 68-74-73=215 | +2 |

Amateurs: R. Foster (+14), Mosey (+14), Stephen (+14), Revell (+15).

=== Final round ===
Saturday, 15 July 1972

==== Summary ====
Jack Nicklaus' quest for the Grand Slam got off to a strong start. He birdied six of the first eleven holes to erase the six-shot deficit. In the final pairing, Lee Trevino and Tony Jacklin started poorly, both were two over par on the day and trailed Nicklaus heading to the ninth hole. The final pairing both made eagle on the par-5. A birdie by Jacklin on the 12th hole created a three-way tie for the lead, which would hold until Nicklaus bogeyed the par-3 16th. The Grand Slam chase was over. The final pairing began the par-5 17th hole tied for the lead. The penultimate 71st hole would prove crucial.

A series of four poor shots left Trevino over the green in short rough. Meanwhile, Jacklin was faced with an 18-foot birdie putt. In what was the shot of the tournament, Trevino chipped-in for par. This was his fourth chip-in of the tournament. The sudden change in circumstances was amplified when Jacklin turned his potential birdie into a three putt bogey. Trevino held a one shot lead with one hole remaining.

On the final hole Trevino put his approach shot within six feet of the hole, while Jacklin found the bunker. Jacklin's second consecutive bogey pushed him down to third place. Trevino missed his birdie putt, but the tap-in par secured his second consecutive Open Championship.

==== Final leaderboard ====
Champion
(a) = amateur
(c) = past champion

| Place | Player | Score | To par | Money (£) |
|---|---|---|---|---|
| 1 | (United States) Lee Trevino (c) | 71-70-66-71=278 | −6 | 5,500 |
| 2 | (United States) Jack Nicklaus (c) | 70-72-71-66=279 | −5 | 4,000 |
| 3 | (England) Tony Jacklin (c) | 69-72-67-72=280 | −4 | 3,250 |
| 4 | (United States) Doug Sanders | 71-71-69-70=281 | −3 | 2,750 |
| 5 | (Scotland) Brian Barnes | 71-72-69-71=283 | −1 | 2,450 |
| 6 | (South Africa) Gary Player (c) | 71-71-76-67=285 | +1 | 2,150 |
| T7 | (England) Guy Hunt | 75-72-67-72=286 | +2 | 1,663 |
| T7 | (United States) Arnold Palmer (c) | 73-73-69-71=286 | +2 | 1,663 |
| T7 | (England) David Vaughan | 74-73-70-69=286 | +2 | 1,663 |
| T7 | (United States) Tom Weiskopf | 73-74-70-69=286 | +2 | 1,663 |

- The exchange rate at the time was approximately 2.45 dollars (US) per pound sterling.

==== Scorecard ====
Final round

| Hole | 1 | 2 | 3 | 4 | 5 | 6 | 7 | 8 | 9 | 10 | 11 | 12 | 13 | 14 | 15 | 16 | 17 | 18 |
|---|---|---|---|---|---|---|---|---|---|---|---|---|---|---|---|---|---|---|
| Par | 4 | 4 | 4 | 3 | 5 | 4 | 3 | 4 | 5 | 4 | 4 | 4 | 3 | 4 | 4 | 3 | 5 | 4 |
| (United States) Trevino | -5 | -6 | -6 | -6 | -5 | -5 | -4 | -4 | -6 | −6 | −6 | −6 | −6 | −6 | −6 | −6 | −6 | −6 |
| (United States) Nicklaus | E | −1 | −2 | −2 | −3 | −3 | −3 | −3 | −4 | −5 | −6 | −6 | −6 | −6 | −6 | −5 | −5 | −5 |
| (England) Jacklin | -4 | -4 | -4 | -4 | -4 | −3 | −3 | −3 | −5 | −5 | −5 | −6 | −6 | −6 | −6 | −6 | −5 | −4 |

Cumulative tournament scores, relative to par

| Eagle | Birdie | Bogey |
