= 1977 World Cup =

1977 World Cup may refer to:

- 1977 Rugby League World Cup
- 1977 World Cup (men's golf)
- 1977 IAAF World Cup
