= John Hudson (golfer) =

English professional golfer

Personal information
- Full name: John Anthony Hudson
- Nationality: England
- Born: 26 August 1945 (age 81) Wokingham, Berkshire, England
- Height: 6 ft 1 in (1.85 m)

Career
- Sport: Golf
- Turned professional: 1964
- Former tours: European Tour; European Seniors Tour

Best results in major championships
- Masters Tournament: DNP
- PGA Championship: DNP
- U.S. Open: DNP
- The Open Championship: CUT: 1970, 1973, 1975, 1976

John Anthony Hudson (born 26 August 1945) is an English professional golfer.

== Career ==
In 1945, Hudson was born in Wokingham, Berkshire.

In 1964, Hudson turned professional. He was a European Tour member for three years: 1971, 1974, and 1976.

Although relatively little-known, Hudson – then 25 years old, and club professional at Hendon – achieved fame during the second round of the 1971 Martini International tournament, held at the Royal Norwich Golf Club. Teeing off, using a 4-iron, at the par-three, 195-yard 11th hole, Hudson holed his tee shot for a hole-in-one. At the next hole, the downhill 311-yard, par-four 12th, and this time using a driver, he once again holed his tee shot, for another ace. This is believed to be the only time a player has scored holes-in-one at consecutive holes in a major professional tournament. Hudson eventually finished tied for ninth place in this tournament, and earned £160, out of a total prize fund of £7,000, for his efforts.

Hudson played on the European Seniors Tour from 1995 to 2000, and is now the professional at Rivenhall Oaks Golf Centre in Witham, Essex.

== Results in major championships ==
Tournament	1970	1971	1972	1973	1974	1975	1976
The Open Championship	CUT			CUT		CUT	CUT

Note: Hudson only played in The Open Championship.

Did not play

CUT = missed the half-way cut (3rd round cut in 1970 Open Championship)
