= Mufulira Open =

Golf tournament

Tournament information
- Location: Mufulira, Zambia
- Established: 1970
- Course: Mufulira Golf Club
- Tour: Safari Circuit
- Format: Stroke play
- Month played: March
- Final year: 1984

Final champion
- (Republic of Ireland) Eamonn Darcy

The Mufulira Open was a men's professional golf tournament played at Mufulira Golf Club in Mufulira, Zambia between 1970 and 1984. It was one of three Zambian events on the Safari Circuit schedule.

The Mufulira Open was founded a year after the Lusaka Open, but pre-dated the Zambia Open which was first contested in 1972. There was no tournament in 1974, as Mufulira Golf Club hosted the Zambia Open. From 1976 the tournament was only played every other year, alternating with the Cock o' the North tournament.

An English golfer, David Moore, aged 22, was shot and killed during the 1976 tournament.

== Winners ==
| Year | Winner | Country | Score | To par | Margin of victory | Runner(s)-up | Ref |
|---|---|---|---|---|---|---|---|
| 1984 | Eamonn Darcy | Ireland | 279 | −13 | 1 stroke | (England) Roger Chapman (England) Tommy Horton | |
| 1983 | No tournament | | | | | | |
| 1982 | Brian Waites | England | 281 | −11 | 3 strokes | (Republic of Ireland) Eamonn Darcy (England) Martin Poxon | |
| 1981 | No tournament | | | | | | |
| 1980 | Brian Waites | England | 279 | | 1 stroke | (Spain) José María Cañizares | |
| 1979 | No tournament | | | | | | |
| 1978 | Peter Berry | England | 281 | | Playoff | (England) Gary Cullen | |
| 1977 | No tournament | | | | | | |
| 1976 | Jack Newton | Australia | 277 | −15 | 1 stroke | (England) Tommy Horton | |
| 1975 | Ronnie Shade | Scotland | 281 | −11 | 1 stroke | (Scotland) Harry Bannerman | |
| 1974 | No tournament. Mufulira hosted the Zambia Open | | | | | | |
| 1973 | David Webster | Scotland | 283 | −9 | 1 stroke | (Republic of Ireland) Hugh Boyle | |
| 1972 | Craig Defoy | Wales | 282 | | Playoff | (England) Doug McClelland | |
| 1971 | Craig Defoy | Wales | | | | | |
| 1970 | Bernard Gallacher | Scotland | 280 | | 6 strokes | (England) Graham Burroughs | |
