= Energen Junior Match Play =

The Energen Junior Match Play was a golf tournament on the British PGA Circuit that was played in October 1969. The event was restricted to the leading 16 golfers, under the age of 25 on 1 April 1969, in the PGA Order of Merit. Play was over two days, with two 18-hole rounds on each day. Total prize money was £2,500. It was played at Sene Valley Golf Club, Hythe, Kent.

The tournament was won by Craig Defoy who beat Guy Hunt 2&1 in the final. Defoy hit a one-iron to within 4 feet at the 17th to take the match. Earlier in the day he had beaten David Jones at the 19th hole, after being dormie-2 and making 5 yards putts on the 17th and 18th.

== Winners ==
Year	Winner	Country	Margin of victory	Runner-up	Winner's share (£)	Ref
1969	Craig Defoy	Wales	2 & 1	(England) Guy Hunt	750	
