= Double Diamond Individual Championship =

Double Diamond Individual
Tournament information
- Location: Scotland
- Established: 1974
- Course: Gleneagles
- Par: 72
- Tour: European Tour
- Format: Stroke play
- Prize fund: £20,000
- Month played: August
- Final year: 1977

Tournament record score
- Aggregate: 132 Simon Owen (1976)
- To par: −8 as above

Final champion
- (England) Nick Faldo
- Location in Scotland

The Double Diamond Individual Championship was a European Tour golf tournament which was played from 1974 to 1977. The event was a 36-hole strokeplay tournament which preceded the Double Diamond International team event, which was played later the same week. The tournament was officially titled as the Double Diamond Strokeplay in 1974 and 1975, and the Skol Lager Individual in its final year.

The 1977 Skol Lager Individual was played over the King's Course at Gleneagles in Scotland on 16 and 17 August. After the 36 holes, Nick Faldo, Craig Defoy and Chris Witcher were tied at 139. Faldo won a playoff at the first extra hole to claim his first European Tour title at the age of twenty.

== Winners ==
| Year | Winner | Score | To par | Margin of victory | Runner(s)-up | Winner's share (£) | Venue | Ref. |
Skol Lager Individual
| 1977 | (England) Nick Faldo | 139 | −5 | Playoff (Note: Faldo won with a birdie on the first extra hole of a sudden-death playoff.) | (Wales) Craig Defoy (Australia) Chris Witcher (a) | 4,000 | Gleneagles | |
Double Diamond Individual Championship
| 1976 | (New Zealand) Simon Owen | 132 | −8 | 2 strokes | (Wales) Brian Huggett (Scotland) David Ingram | 1,500 | Gleneagles | |
Double Diamond Strokeplay
| 1975 | (England) Peter Dawson | 150 | +8 | 3 strokes | (England) Martin Foster (South Africa) Dale Hayes | 1,500 | Turnberry | |
| 1974 | (England) Maurice Bembridge | 136 | −4 | 1 stroke | (New Zealand) Bob Charles | 1,500 | Gleneagles | |
