= Gor-Ray Under-24 Championship =

The Gor-Ray Under-24 Championship was a golf tournament on the British PGA Circuit that was played in 1968 and 1969. The 1968 event was played over 72 holes but this was reduced to 54 holes in 1969. Total prize money was £1,250. It was played at Hartsbourne Golf Club and replaced the Gor-Ray Cup which had been restricted to assistants.

== Winners ==
| Year | Winner | Country | Score | Margin of victory | Runner-up | Winner's share (£) | Ref |
|---|---|---|---|---|---|---|---|
| 1968 | Craig Defoy | Wales | 286 | 1 stroke | (Scotland) Brian Barnes | 300 | |
| 1969 | Nick Job | England | 213 | 1 stroke | (England) Peter Oosterhuis | 300 | |

Oosterhuis was not eligible for prize money in 1969 as he was serving a six-month probationary period as a new PGA member.
