= Manuel Ramos (golfer) =

Spanish professional golfer

Personal information
- Nationality: Spain
- Born: 16 December 1953 (age 72)

Career
- Sport: Golf
- Turned professional: 1972
- Former tour: European Tour
- Professional wins: 1

Number of wins by tour
- European Tour: 1

Manuel Ramos (born 16 December 1953) is a Spanish professional golfer. He won the 1977 Portuguese Open on his first European Tour start. Trailing Hugh Baiocchi by three strokes after three rounds he had a final round five-under-par 68 at Penina to win by two shots. Each player played one of the first two rounds at the nearby par-71 Palmares golf course. This was to be Ramos's only top-10 finish in a European Tour event. Later in 1977 Ramos won a car for making a hole-in-one in the French Open.

== Professional wins (1) ==
=== European Tour wins (1) ===
| No. | Date | Tournament | Winning score | Margin of victory | Runner-up |
|---|---|---|---|---|---|
| 1 | 9 Apr 1977 | Portuguese Open | −3 (70-74-75-68=287) | 2 strokes | (South Africa) Hugh Baiocchi |
