= 1977 Masters Tournament =

- Front cover of the 1977 Masters Guide

Tournament information
- Dates: April 7–10, 1977
- Location: Augusta, Georgia; 33.503°N 82.020°W
- Course: Augusta National Golf Club
- Organized by: Augusta National Golf Club
- Tour: PGA Tour

Statistics
- Par: 72
- Length: 7,030 yards (6,428 m)
- Field: 77 players, 50 after cut
- Cut: 149 (+5)
- Winner's share: $40,000

Champion
- (United States) Tom Watson
- 276 (−12)
- Location in the United States Location in Georgia

The 1977 Masters Tournament was the 41st Masters Tournament, held April 7–10 at Augusta National Golf Club in Augusta, Georgia.

Tom Watson, age 27, won the first of his two green jackets, two strokes ahead of runner-up Jack Nicklaus. The two were tied after 68 holes, then Watson birdied the par-4 17th. Needing a birdie to tie, Nicklaus bogeyed the final hole, one of 19 times in his career that he was the runner-up in a major championship. It was the second of Watson's eight major championships, and he won a second Masters in 1981.

The pair again dueled for a major title in the final round in July in Scotland, at the Open Championship at Turnberry, also won by Watson.

Although he had won a major in 1975 and led the PGA Tour in season earnings entering this Masters, Watson had been labeled a "choker" early in his pro career, known for relinquishing leads in the final round of majors and regular events. Notable among these was the U.S. Open in 1974 at Winged Foot; his win here and in Scotland put that to rest.

== Field ==
1. Masters champions

Tommy Aaron, George Archer (11), Gay Brewer (8), Billy Casper (8,12), Charles Coody (8,10), Raymond Floyd (8,9,10,12), Doug Ford, Bob Goalby, Jack Nicklaus (2,4,8,9,10,11,12), Arnold Palmer, Gary Player (3,4), Sam Snead, Art Wall Jr.

- Jack Burke Jr., Jimmy Demaret, Ralph Guldahl, Claude Harmon, Ben Hogan, Herman Keiser, Cary Middlecoff, Byron Nelson, Henry Picard, and Gene Sarazen did not play.

The following categories only apply to Americans

2. U.S. Open champions (last five years)

Lou Graham (8,12), Hale Irwin (8,12), Johnny Miller (3,8,9,12), Jerry Pate (9,10,11)

3. The Open champions (last five years)

Tom Watson (9,11), Tom Weiskopf (8,9,10,12)

- Lee Trevino (4,11,12) was recovering from back surgery and did not play

4. PGA champions (last five years)

Dave Stockton (10)

5. 1976 U.S. Amateur semi-finalists

James T. Mason (a), Cary Parker Moore Jr. (a), Bill Sander (6,7,a), Stan Souza (a)

6. Previous two U.S. Amateur and Amateur champions

Vinny Giles (a), Fred Ridley (7,a), Dick Siderowf (7,a)

7. Members of the 1976 U.S. Eisenhower Trophy team

John Fought (a)

8. Top 24 players and ties from the 1976 Masters Tournament

Buddy Allin (11), Jim Colbert, Ben Crenshaw (9,10,11), Al Geiberger (9,11,12), Hubert Green (9), Dave Hill (11), Tom Kite (11), Gene Littler (12), Roger Maltbie (11), Rik Massengale (11), Jerry McGee (10), Curtis Strange, Larry Ziegler (11)

9. Top 16 players and ties from the 1976 U.S. Open

Butch Baird (11), Rod Funseth, Mark Hayes (11), Don January (10,11), Lyn Lott, Mike Morley, Andy North, J. C. Snead (11,12)

- John Mahaffey was injured and did not play

10. Top eight players and ties from 1976 PGA Championship

Gil Morgan, John Schlee

11. Winners of PGA Tour events since the previous Masters

Andy Bean, Woody Blackburn, Danny Edwards, Lee Elder, Gibby Gilbert, Joe Inman, Gary Koch, Billy Kratzert, Bruce Lietzke, Mac McLendon, Tom Purtzer, Bob Wynn

- Blackburn and Kratzert were the winners of the Walt Disney World National Team Championship. Subsequent winners of this pairs event did not receive an invitation.

12. Members of the U.S. 1975 Ryder Cup team

Bob Murphy

13. Foreign invitations

Isao Aoki, Seve Ballesteros, Bruce Devlin (8), David Graham (10,11), Dale Hayes (8), Tommy Horton, John Lister (11), Graham Marsh (8,11), Takashi Murakami, Jack Newton, Christy O'Connor Jnr, Peter Oosterhuis (8), Bob Shearer

- Numbers in brackets indicate categories that the player would have qualified under had they been American.

== Round summaries ==
=== First round ===
Thursday, April 7, 1977

Place	Player	Score	To par
1	(United States) Hubert Green	67	−5
T2	(United States) Don January	69	−3
T2	(United States) Billy Kratzert	69	−3
T4	(United States) Hale Irwin	70	−2
T4	(United States) Tom Kite	70	−2
T4	(United States) Rik Massengale	70	−2
T4	(United States) Jerry Pate	70	−2
T4	(United States) Tom Watson	70	−2
T9	(United States) Buddy Allin	71	−1
T9	(United States) Ben Crenshaw	71	−1
T9	(United States) Raymond Floyd	71	−1
T9	(United States) Mark Hayes	71	−1
T9	(United States) Dave Hill	71	−1
T9	(United States) Gene Littler	71	−1
T9	(South Africa) Gary Player	71	−1

=== Second round ===
Friday, April 8, 1977

Place	Player	Score	To par
T1	(United States) Rod Funseth	72-67=139	−5
T1	(United States) Tom Watson	70-69=139	−5
T3	(United States) Ben Crenshaw	71-69=140	−4
T3	(United States) Billy Kratzert	69-71=140	−4
T5	(United States) Hubert Green	67-74=141	−3
T5	(South Africa) Gary Player	71-70=141	−3
T5	(Australia) Bob Shearer	74-67=141	−3
T8	(Australia) David Graham	75-67=142	−2
T8	(United States) Mac McLendon	72-70=142	−2
T8	(United States) Jack Nicklaus	72-70=142	−2
T8	(United States) Jerry Pate	70-72=142	−2

=== Third round ===
Saturday, April 9, 1977

Place	Player	Score	To par
T1	(United States) Ben Crenshaw	71-69-69=209	−7
T1	(United States) Tom Watson	70-69-70=209	−7
3	(United States) Rik Massengale	70-73-67=210	−6
T4	(United States) Jim Colbert	72-71-69=212	−4
T4	(United States) Jack Nicklaus	72-70-70=212	−4
T6	(United States) Rod Funseth	72-67-74=213	−3
T6	(United States) Hubert Green	67-74-72=213	−3
T6	(United States) Tom Kite	70-73-70=213	−3
T6	(South Africa) Gary Player	71-70-72=213	−3
T10	(United States) Danny Edwards	72-74-68=214	−2
T10	(United States) Raymond Floyd	71-72-71=214	−2
T10	(United States) Hale Irwin	70-74-70=214	−2
T10	(United States) Don January	69-76-69=214	−2

=== Final round ===
Sunday, April 10, 1977

==== Final leaderboard ====
Champion
Silver Cup winner (low amateur)
(a) = amateur
(c) = past champion

Top 10
Place	Player	Score	To par	Money (US$)
1	(United States) Tom Watson	70-69-70-67=276	−12	40,000
2	(United States) Jack Nicklaus (c)	72-70-70-66=278	−10	30,000
T3	(United States) Tom Kite	70-73-70-67=280	−8	17,500
T3	(United States) Rik Massengale	70-73-67-70=280	−8	17,500
5	(United States) Hale Irwin	70-74-70-68=282	−6	12,500
T6	(Australia) David Graham	75-67-73-69=284	−4	10,500
T6	(United States) Lou Graham	75-71-69-69=284	−4	10,500
T8	(United States) Ben Crenshaw	71-69-69-76=285	−3	5,667
T8	(United States) Raymond Floyd (c)	71-72-71-71=285	−3	5,667
T8	(United States) Hubert Green	67-74-72-72=285	−3	5,667
T8	(United States) Don January	69-76-69-71=285	−3	5,667
T8	(United States) Gene Littler	71-72-73-69=285	−3	5,667
T8	(United States) John Schlee	75-73-69-68=285	−3	5,667

Leaderboard below the top 10
Place	Player	Score	To par	Money ($)
T14	(United States) Billy Casper (c)	72-72-73-69=286	−2	3,000
T14	(United States) Jim Colbert	72-71-69-74=286	−2	3,000
T14	(United States) Rod Funseth	72-67-74-73=286	−2	3,000
T14	(United States) Jerry Pate	70-72-74-70=286	−2	3,000
T14	(United States) Tom Weiskopf	73-71-71-71=286	−2	3,000
T19	(United States) George Archer (c)	74-74-69-70=287	−1	2,500
T19	(United States) Andy Bean	74-70-71-72=287	−1	2,500
T19	(United States) Danny Edwards	72-74-68-73=287	−1	2,500
T19	(United States) Lee Elder	76-68-72-71=287	−1	2,500
T19	(South Africa) Gary Player (c)	71-70-72-74=287	−1	2,500
T24	(United States) Billy Kratzert	69-71-78-70=288	E	2,200
T24	(United States) Andy North	74-74-71-69=288	E	2,200
T24	(United States) Arnold Palmer (c)	76-71-71-70=288	E	2,200
T24	(United States) Bob Wynn	75-73-70-70=288	E	2,200
T28	(Japan) Isao Aoki	73-76-70-70=289	+1	2,000
T28	(United States) Bruce Lietzke	73-71-72-73=289	+1	2,000
T28	(United States) Jerry McGee	73-73-72-71=289	+1	2,000
T31	(Australia) Graham Marsh	77-72-72-69=290	+2	1,975
T31	(United States) Bob Murphy	74-72-71-73=290	+2	1,975
T33	(Spain) Seve Ballesteros	74-75-70-72=291	+3	1,950
T33	(United States) Mark Hayes	71-72-72-76=291	+3	1,950
T35	(United States) Tommy Aaron (c)	73-72-73-74=292	+4	1,925
T35	(United States) Johnny Miller	78-71-69-74=292	+4	1,925
T35	(Australia) Bob Shearer	74-67-75-76=292	+4	1,925
T35	(United States) Art Wall Jr. (c)	75-74-71-72=292	+4	1,925
T39	(United States) Dave Hill	71-72-76-74=293	+5	1,900
T39	(United States) J. C. Snead	72-76-73-72=293	+5	1,900
T39	(United States) Dave Stockton	73-72-75-73=293	+5	1,900
T42	(United States) Buddy Allin	71-74-75-74=294	+6	1,875
T42	(Australia) Bruce Devlin	75-69-77-73=294	+6	1,875
T42	(United States) Gary Koch	78-71-72-73=294	+6	1,875
45	(United States) Mac McLendon	72-70-78-75=295	+7	1,850
T46	(United States) Lyn Lott	76-72-77-71=296	+8	1,825
T46	(England) Peter Oosterhuis	73-75-76-72=296	+8	1,825
48	(United States) Mike Morley	75-73-73-76=297	+9	1,800
49	(United States) Bill Sander (a)	80-69-78-72=299	+11	0
50	(United States) John Fought (a)	73-74-78-78=303	+15	0
CUT	(United States) Charles Coody (c)	72-78=150	+6	
CUT	(United States) Al Geiberger	76-74=150	+6	
CUT	(United States) Bob Goalby (c)	76-74=150	+6	
CUT	(South Africa) Dale Hayes	75-75=150	+6	
CUT	(United States) Joe Inman	75-75=150	+6	
CUT	(United States) Tom Purtzer	75-75=150	+6	
CUT	(United States) Butch Baird	76-75=151	+7	
CUT	(New Zealand) John Lister	80-71=151	+7	
CUT	(United States) James T. Mason (a)	76-75=151	+7	
CUT	(Japan) Takashi Murakami	78-73=151	+7	
CUT	(United States) Dick Siderowf (a)	76-75=151	+7	
CUT	(United States) Gay Brewer (c)	78-74=152	+8	
CUT	(United States) Gibby Gilbert	76-76=152	+8	
CUT	(England) Tommy Horton	77-75=152	+8	
CUT	(United States) Cary Parker Moore Jr. (a)	76-76=152	+8	
CUT	(United States) Gil Morgan	73-79=152	+8	
CUT	(United States) Woody Blackburn	74-79=153	+9	
CUT	(United States) Roger Maltbie	77-76=153	+9	
CUT	(Australia) Jack Newton	76-77=153	+9	
CUT	(United States) Curtis Strange	79-74=153	+9	
CUT	(United States) Doug Ford (c)	77-77=154	+10	
CUT	(United States) Fred Ridley (a)	76-78=154	+10	
CUT	(United States) Larry Ziegler	83-71=154	+10	
CUT	(Republic of Ireland) Christy O'Connor Jnr	78-79=157	+13	
CUT	(United States) Stan Souza (a)	75-83=158	+14	
CUT	(United States) Vinny Giles (a)	82-79=161	+17	
WD	(United States) Sam Snead (c)	83	+11	

==== Scorecard ====
Hole	1	2	3	4	5	6	7	8	9	10	11	12	13	14	15	16	17	18
Par	4	5	4	3	4	3	4	5	4	4	4	3	5	4	5	3	4	4
(United States) Watson	−7	−7	−7	−7	−8	−9	−10	−11	−11	−10	−10	−10	−11	−10	−11	−11	−12	−12
(United States) Nicklaus	−5	−6	−6	−6	−6	−6	−6	−7	−7	−8	−8	−9	−10	−10	−11	−11	−11	−10
(United States) Massengale	−6	−7	−7	−7	−8	−8	−9	−10	−10	−9	−8	−8	−8	−8	−8	−8	−8	−8
(United States) Crenshaw	−7	−6	−5	−5	−5	−5	−5	−5	−5	−5	−4	−2	−2	−2	−3	−3	−3	−3

Cumulative tournament scores, relative to par

Eagle	Birdie	Bogey	Double bogey	Triple bogey+
