= Craig Defoy =

Welsh golfer

Personal information
- Full name: Craig Bryan Defoy
- Nationality: Wales
- Born: 27 March 1947 (age 79) Kane, Pennsylvania, U.S.
- Height: 6 ft 1 in (1.85 m)
- Weight: 196 lb (89 kg; 14.0 st)

Career
- Sport: Golf
- Turned professional: 1964
- Former tours: European Tour; European Seniors Tour
- Professional wins: 13

Best results in major championships
- Masters Tournament: DNP
- PGA Championship: DNP
- U.S. Open: DNP
- The Open Championship: 4th: 1971

Craig Bryan Defoy (born 27 March 1947) is a Welsh professional golfer. He finished fourth in the 1971 Open Championship.

== Professional career ==
Defoy had a successful start to his tournament career, winning three age-restricted events, the Gor-Ray Under-24 Championship in 1968 and Lord Derby’s Under-23 Professional Tournament and the Energen Junior Match Play, for under-25s, in 1969.

Defoy later played on the European Tour where he did not win but had three second-place finishes: 1973 Spanish Open, 1976 Sun Alliance Match Play Championship, and 1977 Skol Lager Individual (playoff loss). Playing with Derek Small he was also runner-up in the 1974 Sumrie-Bournemouth Better-Ball, losing a playoff. He won five times on the Safari Circuit between 1970 and 1973.

Defoy also played on the European Seniors Tour where his best finish was as runner-up in the 1997 Jersey Seniors Open and in the 2001 SSL International Sodexho Match Play Championship.

Defoy represented Wales seven times in the World Cup and won the Welsh Professional Championship four times.

== Professional wins ==
- 1968 Gor-Ray Under-24 Championship
- 1969 Lord Derby’s Under-23 Professional Tournament, Energen Junior Match Play
- 1970 Cock of the North
- 1971 Mufulira Open
- 1972 Zambia Open, Mufulira Open
- 1973 Zambia Open
- 1975 Welsh Professional Championship
- 1977 Welsh Professional Championship
- 1981 Welsh Professional Championship
- 1982 Welsh Professional Championship
- 1999 PGA Senior Club Professional Championship

== Playoff record ==
European Tour playoff record (0–1)

| No. | Year | Tournament | Opponents | Result |
|---|---|---|---|---|
| 1 | 1977 | Skol Lager Individual | (England) Nick Faldo, (Australia) Chris Witcher (a) | Faldo won with birdie on first extra hole |

== Results in major championships ==
| Tournament | 1966 | 1967 | 1968 | 1969 | 1970 | 1971 | 1972 | 1973 | 1974 | 1975 | 1976 | 1977 | 1978 | 1979 | 1980 | 1981 | 1982 | 1983 |
|---|---|---|---|---|---|---|---|---|---|---|---|---|---|---|---|---|---|---|
| The Open Championship | T52 | CUT | | CUT | | 4 | T23 | T31 | CUT | CUT | CUT | CUT | CUT | | | | | CUT |

Note: Defoy only played in the Open Championship.

Top 10
Did not play

CUT = missed the half-way cut (3rd round cut in 1969, 1975 and 1983)
"T" = tied

== Team appearances ==
- World Cup (representing Wales): 1971, 1973, 1974, 1975, 1976, 1977, 1978
- Double Diamond International (representing Wales): 1971, 1972, 1973, 1974, 1975, 1976, 1977
- Philip Morris International (representing Wales): 1975
- PGA Cup (representing Great Britain and Ireland): 1981 (tie), 1984 (winners), 1996 (tie, non-playing captain), 1998 (non-playing captain)
- Hennessy Cognac Cup (representing Wales): 1984
