= Maurice Bembridge =

English professional golfer (1945–2024)

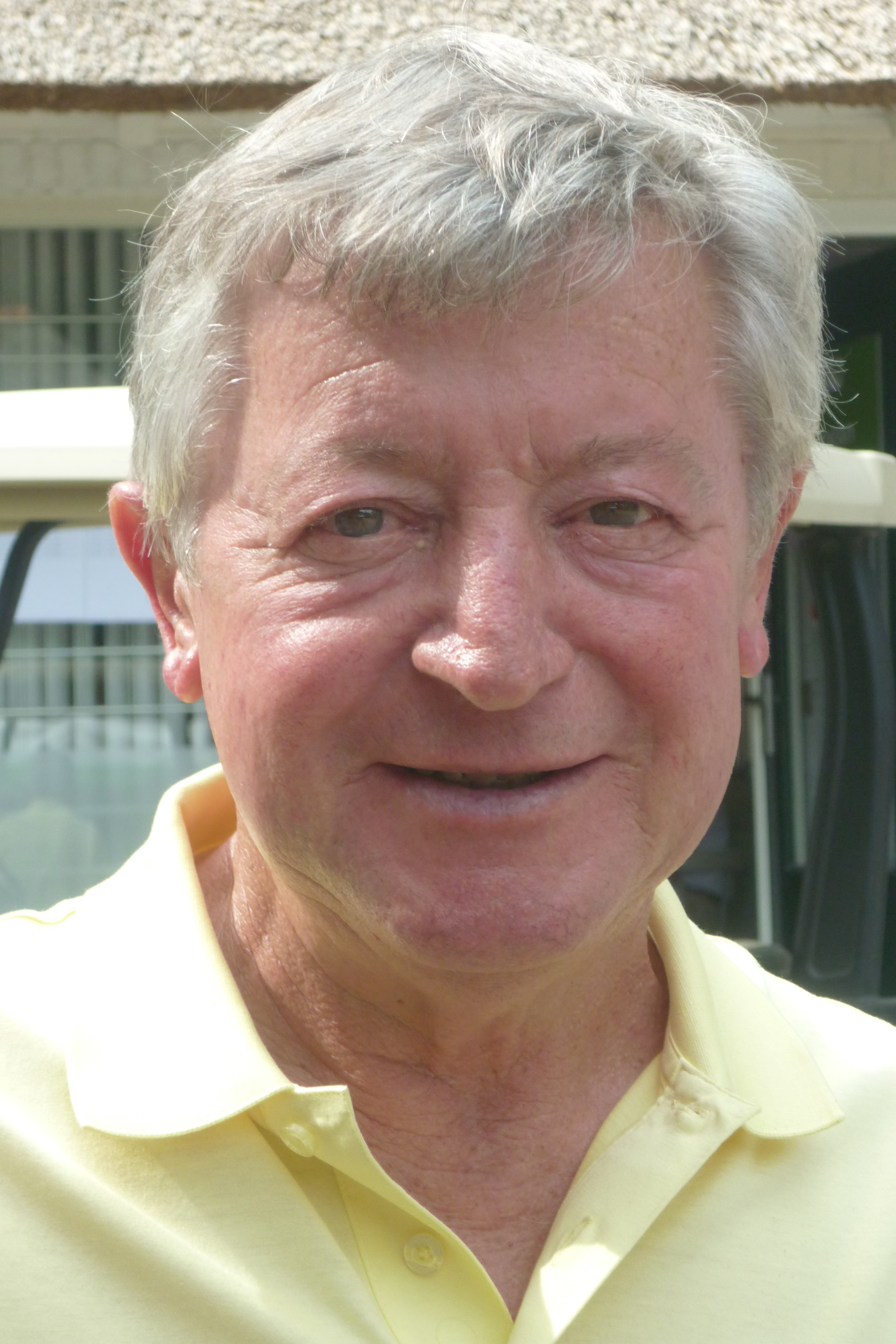
- Bembridge in 2010

Personal information
- Full name: Maurice Bembridge
- Nationality: England
- Born: 21 February 1945 Worksop, Nottinghamshire, England
- Died: 2 March 2024 (aged 79) Uzwil, Switzerland
- Height: 5 ft 7 in (1.70 m)

Career
- Sport: Golf
- Turned professional: 1960
- Former tours: European Tour; New Zealand Golf Circuit; Safari Circuit; European Seniors Tour
- Professional wins: 20

Number of wins by tour
- European Tour: 6
- European Senior Tour: 2
- Other: 12

Best results in major championships
- Masters Tournament: T9: 1974
- PGA Championship: DNP
- U.S. Open: DNP
- The Open Championship: 5th: 1968

Maurice Bembridge (21 February 1945 – 2 March 2024) was an English professional golfer. Early in his career he had some success on the British PGA, winning the 1969 News of the World Match Play and the 1971 Dunlop Masters. He would go on to win six times on the British PGA's successor circuit, the European Tour. He also had some success overseas, winning the New Zealand Golf Circuit's Caltex Tournament in 1970 and the Kenya Open three times. Late in his career, Bembridge had some success on the European Senior Tour, winning twice.

== Professional career ==
In 1960, at the age of 15, Bembridge turned professional. Shortly thereafter, he became an assistant at Worksop Golf Club. In 1966, he won the Llandudno Assistant Professionals' Tournament and was a runner-up in the Gor-Ray Cup, the PGA Assistants’ Championship, behind Vince Hood. In 1967, Bembridge moved to Little Aston Golf Club and had more success, winning the Gor-Ray Cup and the Hesketh Assistant Professionals' Tournament. Bembridge qualified for the Open Championship in both 1966 and 1967, although he missed the cut on both occasions. In 1967, he led the qualifiers at Delamere Forest Golf Club.

In April 1968, Bembridge had his first overseas success, winning the Kenya Open, two strokes ahead of Terry Westbrook. Later in the year he finished 5th in the Open Championship, four shots behind winner Gary Player and was the leading British golfer. In April 1969 Bembridge retained his Kenya Open title. In June he won the Sumrie Better-Ball, which he and Ángel Gallardo won by a shot from Hedley Muscroft and Lionel Platts. In July he was selected for the Ryder Cup at Royal Birkdale, to be played in late September. In early September, Bembridge had his first big solo tournament win, the News of the World Match Play, where he beat 56-year-old Dai Rees 6&5 in the 18-hole final. Bembridge performed well in the tied Ryder Cup match with two wins and a half in his five matches. His victory in the News of the World Match Play earned Bembridge an invitation to play in the 1969 Piccadilly World Match Play Championship, where he lost 6&5 to Bob Charles.

In 1971 Bembridge had his first important British stroke-play victory, taking the Dunlop Masters, two strokes ahead of Peter Oosterhuis.

Bembridge played on the European Tour from its foundation in 1972. In March 1972 he won the Lusaka Open in Zambia, by a stroke from Doug McClelland, having started with a 63, but he only finished 19th in the European Tour Order of Merit that season. He finished second in the European Tour Order of Merit was second in 1973. He won the Martini International, was third three times and had a number of other top-10 finishes. Bembridge won three times on the 1974 European Tour, the Piccadilly Medal, the Double Diamond Strokeplay and the Viyella PGA Championship but was less consistent, finishing 12th in the Order of Merit. He won again in 1975, the German Open where he won by 7 strokes. He was also runner-up in the Benson & Hedges Festival of Golf and finished 11th in the Order of Merit.

After 1975 his best year was 1979 when he won his third Kenya Open and had his final European Tour win in the Benson & Hedges International Open, a result that lifted him to 18th in the Order of Merit. He also came close to winning the 1982 Irish Open where he was runner-up, a stroke behind John O'Leary. Bembridge continued playing on the European Tour but with less success, his final season being 1987.

After turning fifty Bembridge played on the European Senior Tour, winning twice at that level, the 1996 Hippo Jersey Seniors and the 1998 Swedish Seniors. He was also runner-up in the 2001 De Vere PGA Seniors Championship and was twice in the top 10 of the Order of Merit, 7th in 1996 and 9th in 1997. He was a member of the European Senior Tour committee for nine years and was its chairman from 2007 to 2011.

== Death ==
Bembridge died from cancer on 2 March 2024, at the age of 79.

== Professional wins (20) ==
=== European Tour wins (6) ===
No.	Date	Tournament	Winning score	Margin of victory	Runner(s)-up
1	9 Jun 1973	Martini International	−9 (70-68-67-74=279)	1 stroke	(Wales) Dai Rees, (England) Peter Wilcock
2	25 May 1974	Piccadilly Medal	−8 (65)	5 strokes	(England) Peter Oosterhuis
3	21 Aug 1974	Double Diamond Strokeplay	−4 (70-66=136)	1 stroke	(New Zealand) Bob Charles
4	31 Aug 1974	Viyella PGA Championship	−10 (76-69-69-64=278)	1 stroke	(England) Peter Oosterhuis
5	3 Aug 1975	German Open	+5 (75-72-69-69=285)	7 strokes	(United States) Lon Hinkle, (Australia) Bob Shearer
6	12 Aug 1979	Benson & Hedges International Open	−8 (67-67-69-69=272)	2 strokes	(Scotland) Ken Brown

=== Other European wins (3) ===
- 1969 Sumrie Better-Ball (with Ángel Gallardo), News of the World Match Play
- 1971 Dunlop Masters

=== New Zealand Golf Circuit wins (1) ===
No.	Date	Tournament	Winning score	Margin of victory	Runner-up
1	21 Nov 1970	Caltex Tournament	+2 (69-76-70-71=286)	Shared title with (New Zealand) Terry Kendall	

=== Safari Circuit wins (1) ===
No.	Date	Tournament	Winning score	Margin of victory	Runner-up
1	17 Mar 1979	Benson & Hedges Kenya Open	−13 (67-65-69-70=271)	Playoff	(Scotland) Bernard Gallacher

=== Other African wins (3) ===
- 1968 Kenya Open
- 1969 Kenya Open
- 1972 Lusaka Open

=== Other wins (4) ===
- 1966 Llandudno Assistant Professionals' Tournament
- 1967 Gor-Ray Cup, Hesketh Assistant Professionals' Tournament, Second City Tournament

=== European Seniors Tour wins (2) ===
No.	Date	Tournament	Winning score	Margin of victory	Runner(s)-up
1	9 Jun 1996	Hippo Jersey Seniors	−14 (68-67-67=202)	7 strokes	(Italy) Roberto Bernardini, (Italy) Alberto Croce, (Scotland) David Huish, (South Africa) Vincent Tshabalala
2	27 Jun 1998	Swedish Seniors	−4 (70-67-72=209)	Playoff	(England) Jim Rhodes

European Seniors Tour playoff record (1–0)

No.	Year	Tournament	Opponent	Result
1	1998	Swedish Seniors	(England) Jim Rhodes	Won with birdie on first extra hole

== Results in major championships ==
Tournament	1966	1967	1968	1969
Masters Tournament				
The Open Championship	CUT	CUT	5	CUT

Tournament	1970	1971	1972	1973	1974	1975	1976	1977	1978	1979
Masters Tournament	T38				T9	T26	CUT			
The Open Championship	T13	T60	T19	CUT	T44	T16	CUT	T56		CUT

Tournament	1980	1981	1982	1983	1984	1985	1986
Masters Tournament							
The Open Championship	CUT	CUT	CUT		CUT	CUT	CUT

Note: Bembridge only played in the Masters Tournament and The Open Championship.

Top 10
Did not play

CUT = missed the half-way cut (3rd round cut in 1969, 1980 and 1981 Open Championships)
"T" indicates a tie for a place

== Team appearances ==
- Ryder Cup (representing Great Britain & Ireland): 1969 (tie), 1971, 1973, 1975
- World Cup (representing England): 1974, 1975
- Double Diamond International (representing England): 1973, 1974 (winners), 1975
- Datsun International (representing Great Britain and Ireland): 1976
- Philip Morris International (representing England): 1976
- Praia d'El Rey European Cup: 1997 (winners)
