= Double Diamond International =

UK golf tournament

The Double Diamond International was a team golf tournament that was played from 1971 to 1977. It was hosted in England for the first three years, and then in Scotland.

From 1974 and 1977 the event was preceded by an individual 36-hole stroke play tournament that was included on the British PGA tournament circuit; the circuit would later become officially recognised as the European Tour.

== Winners ==
Year	Venue	Winners	Points	Runner-up	Points
Double Diamond Golf Classic
1977	Gleneagles Hotel	United States	3½	Australasia	½
1976	Gleneagles Hotel	England	2	Rest of the World	2
Double Diamond International
1975	Turnberry	The Americas	26	Rest of the World	22
1974	Gleneagles Hotel	England	31	Rest of the World	28
1973	Prince's Golf Club, Sandwich	Scotland	27	Ireland	25
1972	Pannal Golf Club	England	39	Europe	35
1971	South Staffs Golf Club	England	6	Ireland	4

England won in 1976 by being 2 holes up in the four matches played in the final against the Rest of the World.

== 1971 ==
The tournament was played on 21, 22, and 23 October, between the four home nations at South Staffs Golf Club, with each team playing the other three. There were teams of 6, with 2 foursomes matches in the morning and 6 singles in the afternoon. All matches were over 18 holes. The total prize money was £10,250.

The teams were:

- England: Bernard Hunt (captain), Peter Butler, Neil Coles, John Garner, Tommy Horton, Peter Townsend
- Scotland: Eric Brown (captain), Andrew Brooks, Bernard Gallacher, David Ingram, Frank Rennie, Ronnie Shade
- Wales: Dai Rees (captain), Kim Dabson, Craig Defoy, Brian Huggett, David Llewellyn, David Vaughan
- Ireland: Christy O'Connor Sr (captain), Hugh Boyle, Vince Hood, Hugh Jackson, Jimmy Kinsella, Paddy Skerritt

=== Matches ===
Thursday 21 October

Team	Score	Team	Score	Halved
England	6	Wales	1	1
(Republic of Ireland) Ireland	5	Scotland	2	1

Friday 22 October

Team	Score	Team	Score	Halved
England	7	(Republic of Ireland) Ireland	1	0
Wales	6	Scotland	2	0

Saturday 23 October

Team	Score	Team	Score	Halved
(Republic of Ireland) Ireland	4	Wales	3	1
England	5	Scotland	2	1

=== Final table ===
Team	Matches		Individual games			Points
Team	Won	Lost	Won	Lost	Halved	Points
England	3	0	18	4	2	6
(Republic of Ireland) Ireland	2	1	10	12	2	4
Wales	1	2	10	12	2	2
Scotland	0	3	6	16	2	0

Neil Coles, John Garner, Tommy Horton, Jimmy Kinsella, Peter Townsend won their 3 singles matches and shared the individual prize of £350. Kinsella beat all the three opposing captains in his singles matches.

== 1972 ==
The tournament was played on 31 August and 1 and 2 September between six teams, the four home nations, Continental Europe and the Rest of the World. The event was played at Pannal Golf Club, Harrogate with each team playing the other five. There were teams of 8 with each match consisting of 6 singles matches over 18 holes. Two points were awarded for each match won with one point for a halved match. The overall winner was decided on points won. The total prize money was £15,000.

The teams were:

- England: Bernard Hunt (Captain), Peter Butler, John Garner, Guy Hunt, Tony Jacklin, Doug McClelland, Lionel Platts, Peter Townsend
- Scotland: Eric Brown (Captain), Harry Bannerman, Brian Barnes, Gordon Cunningham, Bernard Gallacher, Ronnie Shade, Bobby Walker, Norman Wood
- Wales: Dai Rees (Captain), Kim Dabson, Craig Defoy, Brian Huggett, David Llewellyn, Andrew Phillips, Dave Thomas, David Vaughan
- Ireland: Christy O'Connor Snr (Captain), Hugh Boyle, Vince Hood, Hugh Jackson, Jimmy Kinsella, Christy O'Connor Jnr, John O'Leary, Eddie Polland
- Continental Europe: Ramón Sota (Captain), Manuel Ballesteros, Valentín Barrios, Roberto Bernardini, Ángel Gallardo, Jaime Gallardo, Donald Swaelens, Ettore Della Torre
- Rest of the World: Peter Thomson (Captain), Hugh Baiocchi, Vin Baker, Gary Baleson, Dale Hayes, Jack Newton, Ian Stanley, Guy Wolstenholme

=== Matches ===
Thursday 31 August

Team	Points	Team	Points
England	9	Wales	3
(Republic of Ireland) Ireland	7	Rest of the World	5
Europe	8	(Republic of Ireland) Ireland	4
Scotland	7	Wales	5
England	8	Rest of the World	4

Friday 1 September

Team	Points	Team	Points
Europe	7	Scotland	5
Rest of the World	6	Wales	6
England	7	(Republic of Ireland) Ireland	5
Rest of the World	6	Scotland	6
Europe	10	Wales	2

Saturday 2 September

Team	Points	Team	Points
Scotland	8	(Republic of Ireland) Ireland	4
England	6	Europe	6
(Republic of Ireland) Ireland	8	Wales	4
Rest of the World	8	Europe	4
England	9	Scotland	3

=== Final table ===
Team	Matches			Points
Team	Won	Lost	Tie	Points
England	4	0	1	39
Europe	3	1	1	35
Rest of the World	1	2	2	29
Scotland	2	2	1	29
(Republic of Ireland) Ireland	2	3	0	28
Wales	0	4	1	20

== 1973 ==
The tournament was played on 30, 31 August and 1 September between six teams, the four home nations, Continental Europe and the Rest of the World. The event was played at Prince's Golf Club, Sandwich with each team playing the other five. There were teams of 5 with each match consisting of 4 singles matches over 18 holes. Two points were awarded for each match won with one point for a halved match. The overall winner was decided on points won. The total prize money remained at £15,000.

The teams were:

- England: Bernard Hunt (Captain), Maurice Bembridge, Neil Coles, Tony Jacklin, Peter Oosterhuis
- Scotland: Eric Brown (Captain), Brian Barnes, Bernard Gallacher, Ronnie Shade, Sam Torrance
- Wales: Dai Rees (Captain), Craig Defoy, Brian Huggett, Dave Thomas, David Vaughan
- Ireland: Christy O'Connor Snr (Captain), Hugh Jackson, Jimmy Kinsella, John O'Leary, Eddie Polland
- Continental Europe: Manuel Ballesteros, Jaime Benito, Jan Dorrestein, Jean Garaïalde, Donald Swaelens (Captain unknown)
- Rest of the World: Bob Charles (Captain), Hugh Baiocchi, Bob Dickson, Orville Moody, Jack Newton

=== Matches ===
Thursday 30 August

Team	Points	Team	Points
England	4	Wales	4
(Republic of Ireland) Ireland	5	Europe	3
Scotland	8	Wales	0
(Republic of Ireland) Ireland	6	Rest of the World	2
England	4	Europe	4

Friday 31 August

Team	Points	Team	Points
Scotland	6	(Republic of Ireland) Ireland	2
Rest of the World	7	Wales	1
England	4	(Republic of Ireland) Ireland	4
Rest of the World	4	Scotland	4
Europe	6	Wales	2

Saturday 1 September

Team	Points	Team	Points
Rest of the World	6	Europe	2
England	6	Scotland	2
(Republic of Ireland) Ireland	8	Wales	0
Scotland	7	Europe	1
England	4	Rest of the World	4

=== Final table ===
Team	Matches			Points
Team	Won	Lost	Tie	Points
Scotland	3	1	1	27
(Republic of Ireland) Ireland	3	1	1	25
Rest of the World	2	1	2	23
England	1	0	4	22
Europe	1	3	1	16
Wales	0	4	1	7

== 1974 ==
The tournament was played on 22, 23 and 24 August between six teams, the four home nations, the Continental Europe and the Rest of the World. The event was played at Gleneagles with each team playing the other five. There were teams of 5 with each match consisting of 4 singles matches over 18 holes. Two points were awarded for each match won with one point for a halved match. The overall winner was decided on points won.

The teams were:

- England: Peter Oosterhuis (Captain), Maurice Bembridge, Tommy Horton, Tony Jacklin, Peter Townsend
- Scotland: Brian Barnes (Captain), Harry Bannerman, David Chillas, Bernard Gallacher, Ronnie Shade
- Wales: Brian Huggett (Captain), Craig Defoy, David Llewellyn, Andrew Phillips, David Vaughan
- Ireland: Christy O'Connor Snr (Captain), Jimmy Kinsella, Christy O'Connor Jnr, John O'Leary, Eddie Polland
- Continental Europe: Donald Swaelens (Captain), Jan Dorrestein, José María Cañizares, Ángel Gallardo, Manuel Piñero
- Rest of the World: Billy Casper (Captain), Bob Charles, Dale Hayes, Jack Newton, Doug Sanders

=== Matches ===
Thursday 22 August

Team	Points	Team	Points
England	8	Wales	0
Europe	4	(Republic of Ireland) Ireland	4
Scotland	5	Wales	3
Rest of the World	6	(Republic of Ireland) Ireland	2
England	8	Europe	0

Friday 23 August

Team	Points	Team	Points
(Republic of Ireland) Ireland	4	Scotland	4
Rest of the World	6	Wales	2
England	5	(Republic of Ireland) Ireland	3
Rest of the World	5	Scotland	3
Wales	5	Europe	3

Saturday 24 August

Team	Points	Team	Points
Rest of the World	8	Europe	0
England	5	Scotland	3
England	5	Rest of the World	3
(Republic of Ireland) Ireland	5	Wales	3
Scotland	5	Europe	3

=== Final table ===
Team	Matches			Points
Team	Won	Lost	Tie	Points
England	5	0	0	31
Rest of the World	4	0	1	28
Scotland	2	1	2	20
(Republic of Ireland) Ireland	1	2	2	18
Wales	1	0	4	13
Europe	0	1	4	10

== 1975 ==
The tournament was played on 25, 26 and 27 September between six teams, the four home nations, The Americas and the Rest of the World. The event was played at Turnberry with each team playing the other five. There were teams of 5 with each match consisting of 4 singles matches over 18 holes. Two points were awarded for each match won with one point for a halved match. The overall winner was decided on points won.

The teams were:

- England: Neil Coles (Captain), Maurice Bembridge, Malcolm Gregson, Tommy Horton, Guy Hunt
- Scotland: Brian Barnes (Captain), Bernard Gallacher, David Huish, Ronnie Shade, Norman Wood
- Wales: Dai Rees (Captain), Craig Defoy, Brian Huggett, David Llewellyn, David Vaughan
- Ireland: Christy O'Connor Snr (Captain), Eamonn Darcy, Christy O'Connor Jnr, John O'Leary, Eddie Polland
- The Americas: Billy Casper (Captain), Jim Colbert, Lou Graham, Roberto De Vicenzo, Hale Irwin
- Rest of the World: Gary Player (Captain), Seve Ballesteros, Bob Charles, Dale Hayes, Jack Newton

=== Matches ===
Thursday 25 September

Team	Points	Team	Points
England	4	Wales	4
Rest of the World	5	(Republic of Ireland) Ireland	3
Scotland	4	Wales	4
The Americas	5	(Republic of Ireland) Ireland	3
Rest of the World	5	England	3

Friday 26 September

Team	Points	Team	Points
(Republic of Ireland) Ireland	4	Scotland	4
The Americas	6	Wales	2
England	4	(Republic of Ireland) Ireland	4
The Americas	5	Scotland	3
Rest of the World	5	Wales	3

Saturday 27 September

Team	Points	Team	Points
The Americas	4	Rest of the World	4
England	4	Scotland	4
(Republic of Ireland) Ireland	4	Wales	4
Scotland	5	Rest of the World	3
The Americas	6	England	2

=== Final table ===
Team	Matches			Points
Team	Won	Lost	Tie	Points
The Americas	4	0	1	26
Rest of the World	3	1	1	22
Scotland	1	1	3	20
(Republic of Ireland) Ireland	0	2	3	18
England	0	2	3	17
Wales	0	2	3	17

== 1976 ==
The tournament was played on 19, 20 and 21 August between eight teams, the four home nations, Continental Europe, the United States, Australasia and the Rest of the World. The event was played at Gleneagles. Teams were divided into two group of four with the each team playing the others in the group on the first two days. The leading two teams in each group then played semi-finals and a final on the last day. There were teams of 5 with each match consisting of 4 singles matches over 18 holes. In the group matches, one point was awarded for each match won with half a point for a halved match. The order of the groups was decided on points won. In the event of a tie between two teams the order was decided by the result of the match between the teams and, if this was a tie, on net holes up overall.

The teams were:

- England: Tony Jacklin (Captain), Peter Butler, Neil Coles, Martin Foster, Tommy Horton, Guy Hunt
- Scotland: Brian Barnes (Captain), Bernard Gallacher, David Huish, Sam Torrance, Norman Wood
- Wales: Dai Rees (Captain), Craig Defoy, Brian Huggett, David Llewellyn, David Vaughan
- Ireland: Christy O'Connor Snr (Captain), Eamonn Darcy, Christy O'Connor Jnr, John O'Leary, Eddie Polland
- Continental Europe: Manuel Piñero (Captain), Francisco Abreu, Salvador Balbuena, Seve Ballesteros, Antonio Garrido
- United States: Johnny Miller (Captain), Lou Graham, Mark Hayes, Jerry Heard, Dave Hill
- Australasia: Bob Charles (Captain), Jack Newton, Simon Owen, Ian Stanley, Guy Wolstenholme
- Rest of the World: Gary Player (Captain), Hugh Baiocchi, Vicente Fernández, Simon Hobday, Kazuo Yoshikawa

=== Group matches ===
Thursday 19 August

Team	Points	Team	Points
England	3	Australasia	1
(Republic of Ireland) Ireland	2	Rest of the World	2
Europe	4	United States	0
Scotland	2	Wales	2
Australasia	2	(Republic of Ireland) Ireland	2
Rest of the World	3	England	1

Friday 20 August

Team	Points	Team	Points
Europe	2	Scotland	2
United States	2	Wales	2
England	2	(Republic of Ireland) Ireland	2
Australasia	2	Rest of the World	2
Scotland	2½	United States	1½
Wales	2½	Europe	1½

=== Group tables ===
Team	Matches			Points
Team	Won	Lost	Tie	Points
Rest of the World	1	0	2	7
England	1	1	1	6
(Republic of Ireland) Ireland	0	0	3	6
Australasia	0	1	2	5

England finished ahead of Ireland since they were 3 holes up while Wales were level.

Team	Matches			Points
Team	Won	Lost	Tie	Points
Europe	1	1	1	7½
Scotland	1	0	2	6½
Wales	1	0	2	6½
United States	0	2	1	3½

Scotland finished ahead of Wales since they were 9 holes up while Wales were 6 holes down.

=== Knock-out ===
Saturday 21 August

Semifinals
Rest of the World	3½
Scotland	½
England	3½'
Europe	½

Finals
Rest of the World	2
England	2
Third place
Scotland	2
Europe	2

England won the final because they were 2 holes up in the four matches. Scotland won the third-place match because they were 9 holes up in the four matches.

== 1977 ==
The tournament was played on 18, 19 and 20 August between eight teams, the four home nations, Continental Europe, the United States, Australasia and the Rest of the World. The event was played at Gleneagles. Teams were divided into two group of four with the each team playing the others in the group on the first two days. The leading two teams in each group then played semi-finals and a final on the last day. There were teams of 5 with each match consisting of 4 singles matches over 18 holes. In the group matches, one point was awarded for each match won with half a point for a halved match. The order of the groups was decided on points won.

The teams were:

- England: Tony Jacklin (Captain), Neil Coles, Nick Faldo, Tommy Horton, Peter Dawson
- Scotland: Brian Barnes (Captain), Ken Brown, Bernard Gallacher, David Ingram, Sam Torrance
- Wales: Brian Huggett (Captain), Simon Cox, Craig Defoy, David Llewellyn, David Vaughan
- Ireland: Christy O'Connor Snr (Captain), Eamonn Darcy, Christy O'Connor Jnr, John O'Leary, Eddie Polland
- Continental Europe: Ángel Gallardo (Captain), Francisco Abreu, Seve Ballesteros, Baldovino Dassù, Philippe Toussaint
- United States: Billy Casper (Captain), Danny Edwards, Bob Murphy, Jerry Pate, Lee Trevino
- Australasia: Bruce Devlin (Captain), Bob Charles, Greg Norman, Simon Owen, Ian Stanley
- Rest of the World: Hugh Baiocchi (Captain), Ernesto Acosta, Simon Hobday, Hsieh Min-Nan, Kazuo Yoshikawa

=== Group matches ===
Thursday 18 August

Team	Points	Team	Points
Australasia	3	England	1
Rest of the World	4	(Republic of Ireland) Ireland	0
United States	3	Europe	1
Wales	2½	Scotland	1½
Australasia	2	(Republic of Ireland) Ireland	2
England	2	Rest of the World	2

Friday 19 August

Team	Points	Team	Points
Scotland	2½	Europe	1½
United States	2½	Wales	1½
(Republic of Ireland) Ireland	3	England	1
Australasia	3	Rest of the World	1
Europe	2	Wales	2
United States	2½	Scotland	1½

=== Group tables ===
Team	Matches			Points
Team	Won	Lost	Tie	Points
Australasia	2	0	1	8
Rest of the World	1	1	1	7
(Republic of Ireland) Ireland	1	1	1	5
England	0	2	1	4

Team	Matches			Points
Team	Won	Lost	Tie	Points
United States	3	0	0	8
Wales	1	1	1	6
Scotland	1	2	0	5½
Europe	0	2	1	4½

=== Knock-out ===
Saturday 20 August

Semifinals
Australasia	3
Wales	1
United States	3½
Rest of the World	½

Finals
Australasia	½
United States	3½
Third place
Wales	2
Rest of the World	2

The Rest of the World won the third-place match because they were 8 holes up in the four matches.
