= Martini International =

Tournament information
- Location: Cheshire, England
- Established: 1961
- Course: Wilmslow Golf Club
- Par: 70
- Tour: European Tour
- Format: Stroke play
- Prize fund: £80,000
- Month played: May
- Final year: 1983

Tournament record score
- Aggregate: 268 Doug Sewell (1970); 268 Peter Thomson (1970); 268 Nick Faldo (1983)
- To par: −16 Doug Sewell (1970) −16 Peter Thomson (1970)

Final champion
- (England) Nick Faldo
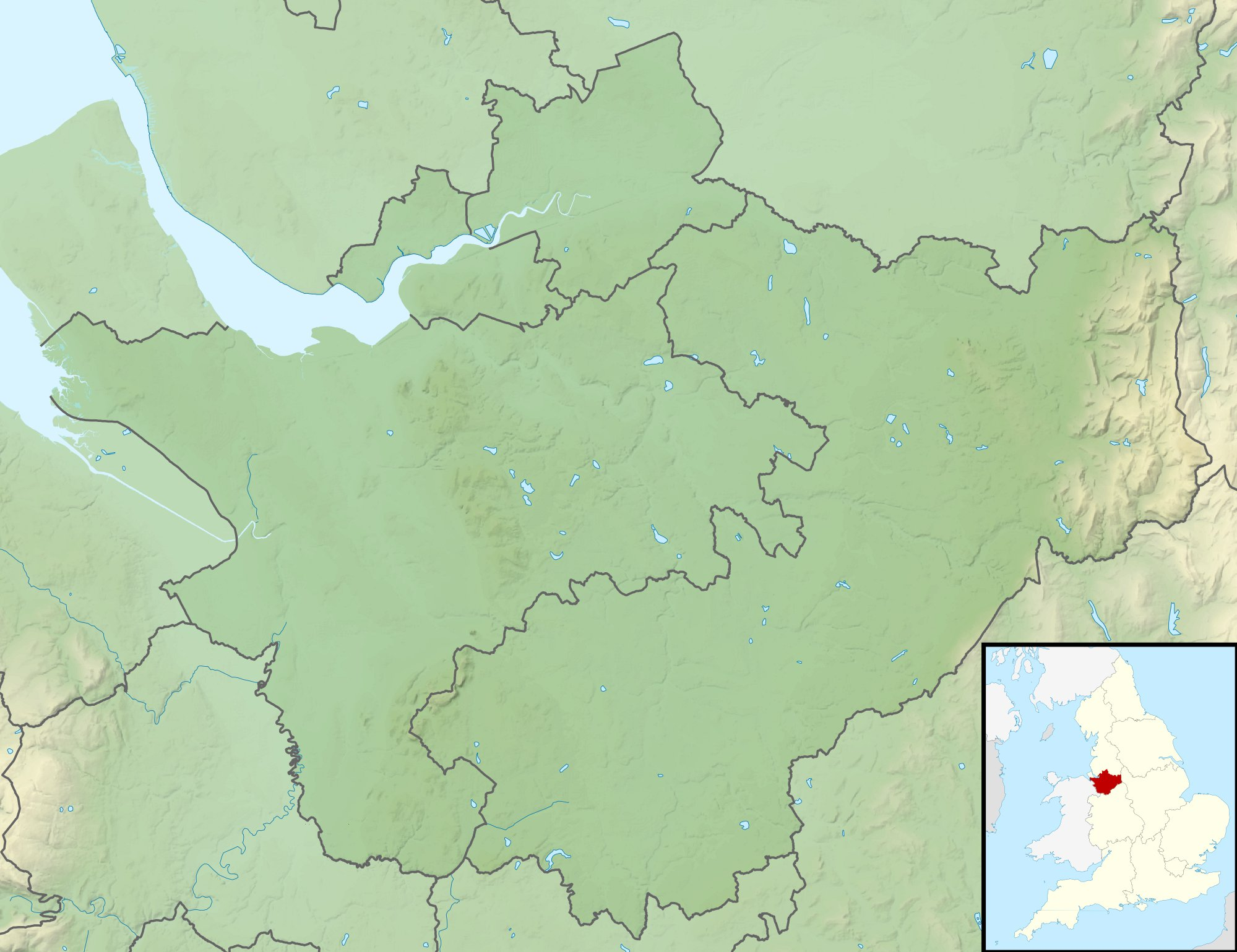
- Location in England Location in Cheshire

The Martini International was a men's professional golf tournament that was held from 1961 to 1983. It was hosted by several different golf clubs in England, Scotland and Wales. It was part of the British PGA tournament circuit, which evolved into the European Tour, and as such is recognised as an official European Tour event from 1972.

The winners included the major champions Peter Thomson, Greg Norman, Nick Faldo and Seve Ballesteros. In 1983 the prize fund was £80,308, which was mid-range for a European Tour event at the time. The tournament was sponsored by beverage company Martini & Rossi.

The 1971 Martini International saw a rare event, when John Hudson scored two successive holes-in-one during his second round at the Royal Norwich Golf Club. Hudson had taken 6 at the par-4 10th hole and then holed out at the 11th and 12th holes. He holed a 4-iron at the 195-yard 11th and then, using a driver, holed out at the downhill 311-yard 12th, making a rare par-4 albatross. Hudson scored 72 for his round, level par, to add to his first round 72. He finished on 287, 5 strokes behind the winner, in a tie for 9th place.

== Winners ==
Year	Winner	Score	To par	Margin of victory	Runner(s)-up	Winner's share (£)	Venue	Ref.
1983	(England) Nick Faldo	268	−12	Playoff (Note: Faldo won with par on third extra hole)	(Spain) José María Cañizares	13,330	Wimslow	
1982	(Scotland) Bernard Gallacher	277	−7	3 strokes	(Spain) José María Cañizares (England) Nick Faldo	11,000	Lindrick	
1981	(Australia) Greg Norman	287	−1	1 stroke	(West Germany) Bernhard Langer	11,000	Wentworth	
1980	(Spain) Seve Ballesteros	286	−2	1 stroke	(Scotland) Brian Barnes	9,000	Wentworth	
1979	(Australia) Greg Norman	288	E	1 stroke	(Spain) Antonio Garrido (England) John Morgan	7,000	Wentworth	
1978	(Spain) Seve Ballesteros	270	−14	5 strokes	(England) Nick Faldo	6,000	Royal Automobile	
1977	(Australia) Greg Norman	277	−11	3 strokes	(South Africa) Simon Hobday	3,000	Blairgowrie	
1976	(Scotland) Sam Torrance	280	−8	2 strokes	(England) Tommy Horton	2,500	Ashburnham	
1975	(Republic of Ireland) Christy O'Connor Jnr (Australia) Ian Stanley	279	−5	Title shared		1,875 (Note: Shared 2,250 and 1,500)	Royal North Devon	
1974	(Australia) Stewart Ginn	286	−2	1 stroke	(Wales) Brian Huggett	2,250	Pannal	
1973	(England) Maurice Bembridge	279	−9	1 stroke	(Wales) Dai Rees (England) Peter Wilcock	2,000	Barnton	
1972	(Scotland) Brian Barnes	277	−7	1 stroke	(Australia) Jack Newton	1,500	Abridge	
1971	(Scotland) Bernard Gallacher	282	−6	1 stroke	(Australia) Kel Nagle	1,250	Royal Norwich	
1970	(England) Doug Sewell (Australia) Peter Thomson	268	−16	Title shared		1,250	Conwy	
1969	(England) Alex Caygill (South Africa) Graham Henning	282	−6	Title shared		1,075 (Note: Shared 1,250 and 900)	Queens Park	
1968	(Wales) Brian Huggett	278		2 strokes	(England) Tommy Horton	1,250	Southerndown	
1967	(England) Malcolm Gregson (Wales) Brian Huggett	279	−9	Title shared			Fulford	
1966	(England) Peter Alliss (England) Bill Large	275	−9	Title shared		875 (Note: Shared 1,000 and 750)	Long Ashton	
1965	(England) Peter Butler	275	−13	4 strokes	(France) Jean Garaïalde (England) Bernard Hunt	1,000	Long Ashton	
1964	(Republic of Ireland) Christy O'Connor Snr	286		6 strokes	(England) Lionel Platts	1,000	Wentworth	
1963	(England) Neil Coles (Republic of Ireland) Christy O'Connor Snr	298		Title shared		875 (Note: Shared 1,000 and 750)	Royal Liverpool	
1962	(Australia) Peter Thomson	275		4 strokes	(Scotland) Eric Brown	1,000	St Andrews	
1961	(England) Bernard Hunt	270		Playoff (Note: Hunt won five-hole aggregate playoff; Hunt: −3 (16), Low: +1 (20))	(Scotland) George Low	1,000	Sundridge Park	
