= Peter Dawson (golfer) =

English golfer (born 1950)

Personal information
- Full name: Peter Dawson
- Nationality: England
- Born: 9 May 1950 (age 76) Doncaster, West Riding of Yorkshire
- Height: 6 ft 2 in (1.88 m)
- Spouse: Liz
- Children: Beverley, Robert

Career
- Sport: Golf
- Turned professional: 1970
- Former tour: European Tour
- Professional wins: 1

Number of wins by tour
- European Tour: 1

Best results in major championships
- Masters Tournament: DNP
- PGA Championship: DNP
- U.S. Open: DNP
- The Open Championship: T18: 1974

Peter Dawson (born 9 May 1950) is an English professional golfer.

== Career ==
Dawson was born in Doncaster. He was a member of the European Tour in the 1970s and won his sole European Tour title at the 1975 Double Diamond Strokeplay. However his most consistent season by far was 1977, when he finished seventh on the European Tour Order of Merit, that being the only time he made the top thirty. He played in the 1977 Ryder Cup, becoming the first left-handed European to play in the competition. He also represented England in the World Cup that year partnering with Nick Faldo.

Since leaving the European Tour in 1981 he has worked as a golf director and club professional in Hardelot France, and then Penina and Sao Lorenzo, Portugal. He was also to coach the national teams in Denmark (where his students included Thomas Bjørn), Switzerland and Morocco. After turning 50, he played several seasons on the European Seniors Tour, with his best finish of 2nd after a playoff at the Tournament Players Championship at the Belfry.

== Professional wins (1) ==
=== European Tour wins (1) ===
No.	Date	Tournament	Winning score	Margin of victory	Runners-up
1	24 Sep 1975	Double Diamond Strokeplay	+8 (77-73=150)	3 strokes	(England) Martin Foster, (South Africa) Dale Hayes

== Playoff record ==
European Seniors Tour playoff record (0–1)

No.	Year	Tournament	Opponent	Result
1	2000	The Belfry PGA Seniors Championship	(United States) John Grace	Lost to birdie on first extra hole

== Results in major championships ==
Tournament	1974	1975	1976	1977	1978	1979	1980	1981	1982
The Open Championship	T18	T32	T42	T22	62	CUT			CUT

Note: Dawson only played in The Open Championship.

Did not play

CUT = missed the half-way cut (3rd round cut in 1979 and 1982 Open Championships)
"T" = tied

== Team appearances ==
- Ryder Cup (representing Great Britain & Ireland): 1977
- World Cup (representing England): 1977
- Double Diamond International (representing England): 1977
