= Jerry McGee =

American professional golfer (1943–2021)

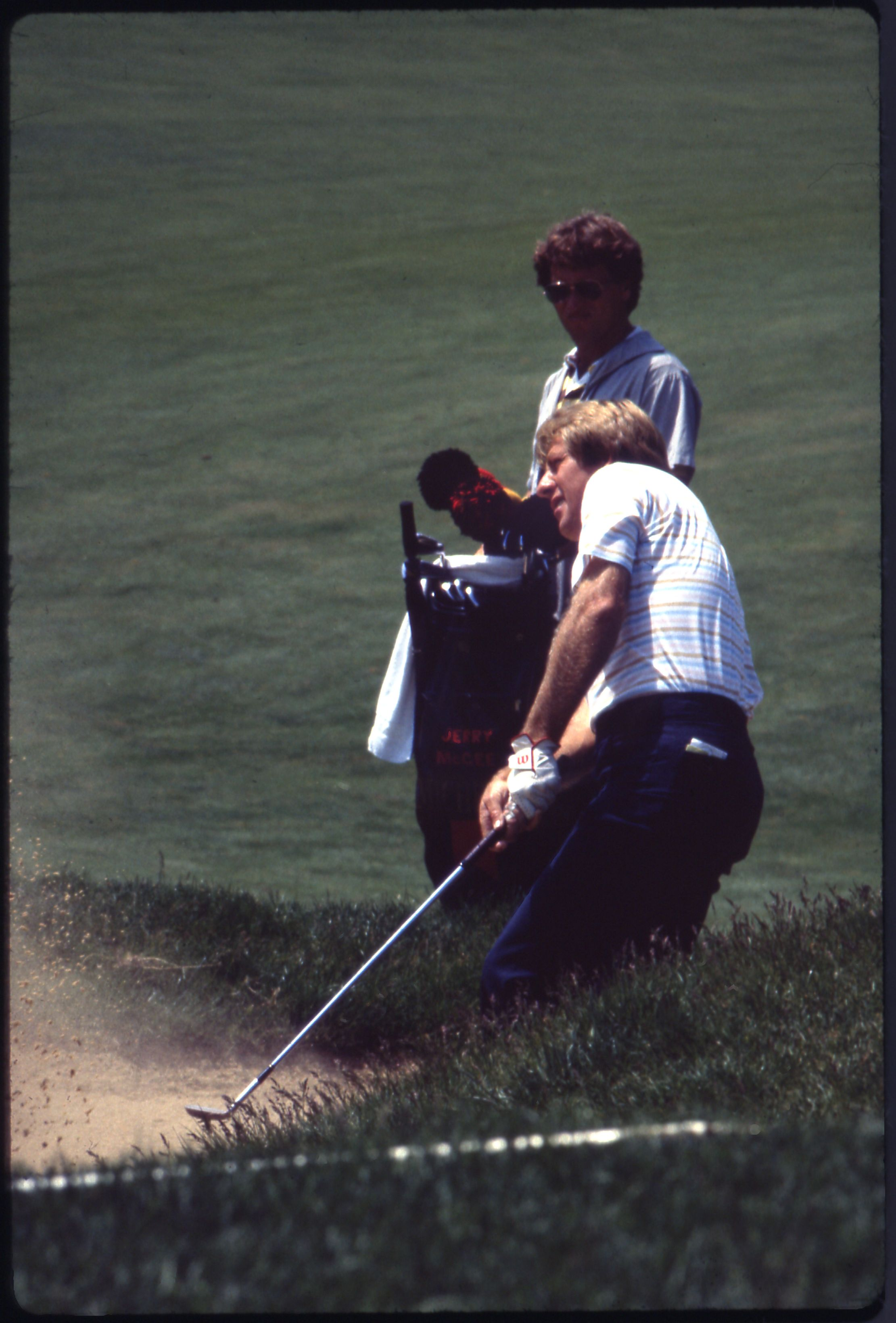
- McGee in 1980

Personal information
- Nationality: United States
- Born: July 21, 1943 New Lexington, Ohio, U.S.
- Died: March 31, 2021 (aged 77)
- Height: 5 ft 9.5 in (1.77 m)
- Weight: 160 lb (73 kg; 11 st)

Career
- Sport: Golf
- College: Ohio State University
- Turned professional: 1966
- Former tours: PGA Tour; Champions Tour
- Professional wins: 5

Number of wins by tour
- PGA Tour: 4
- Other: 1

Best results in major championships
- Masters Tournament: T5: 1972
- PGA Championship: T6: 1977
- U.S. Open: T13: 1971
- The Open Championship: DNP

Jerry McGee (July 21, 1943 – March 31, 2021) was an American professional golfer who played on the PGA Tour and the Champions Tour.

== Career ==
McGee was born in New Lexington, Ohio. He attended Ohio State University and was a member of the golf team.

In 1966, McGee turned pro. He was successful at 1966 PGA Tour Qualifying School. In 1967, McGee joined the PGA Tour.

McGee won four PGA Tour events in the latter half of the 1970s. In 1979, he won twice: a one shot win over Jerry Pate at the Kemper Open, and a couple of months later a one stroke win over Jack Renner at the Sammy Davis Jr.-Greater Hartford Open. His best finish in a major championship was T-5 at the 1972 Masters Tournament. He was a member of the 1977 Ryder Cup team.

McGee was known for his superb play around the greens. At 5 feet 9½ inches tall and a slim 160 pounds, distance in the ball striking phase of the game was a constant problem for him. He was also plagued by injuries and illnesses during his career. McGee retired from the PGA Tour in 1981 largely due to health problems. He took a club pro job at Oak Tree Country Club in Pennsylvania just across the border from his East Palestine, Ohio home.

McGee returned to competitive golf on the Senior PGA Tour in 1993 upon reaching the age of 50. His best finish in this venue is a T-2 at the 1997 BankBoston Classic. In 1999, he underwent treatment for oropharyngeal, squamous cell carcinoma.

== Personal life ==
McGee's son, Mike McGee, a golf agent/businessman, and one-time record-setting pitcher at Mt. Union College, is married to LPGA Tour golfer Annika Sörenstam.

McGee died March 29, 2021, in Florida at the age of 77.

== Professional wins (5) ==
=== PGA Tour wins (4) ===
No.	Date	Tournament	Winning score	Margin of victory	Runner(s)-up
1	Apr 20, 1975	Pensacola Open	−13 (69-66-66-70=271)	2 strokes	(United States) Wally Armstrong
2	Jul 31, 1977	IVB-Philadelphia Golf Classic	−12 (70-68-65-69=272)	4 strokes	(New Zealand) John Lister, (Australia) Bob Shearer
3	Jun 3, 1979	Kemper Open	−16 (61-74-69-68=272)	1 stroke	(United States) Jerry Pate
4	Aug 12, 1979	Sammy Davis Jr.-Greater Hartford Open	−17 (68-67-67-65=267)	1 stroke	(United States) Jack Renner

PGA Tour playoff record (0–1)

No.	Year	Tournament	Opponent	Result
1	1976	World Open Golf Championship	(United States) Raymond Floyd	Lost to birdie on first extra hole

=== Other wins (1) ===
- 1982 Tri-State Open

== Results in major championships ==
Tournament	1970	1971	1972	1973	1974	1975	1976	1977	1978	1979	1980
Masters Tournament			T5	CUT			T15	T28	T11	CUT	CUT
U.S. Open	T69	T13	T40	CUT	T30	CUT		T19	T27		T31
PGA Championship		T22	T29	T66	T55	T40	T8	T6	DQ	T12	CUT

Note: McGee never played in The Open Championship

Top 10
Did not play

CUT = missed the half-way cut
"T" indicates a tie for a place
DQ = disqualified

== U.S. national team appearances ==
Professional

- Ryder Cup: 1977 (winners)

== See also ==
- 1966 PGA Tour Qualifying School graduates
