= Lord Derby's Young Professionals' Tournament =

Golf tournament

Lord Derby's Young Professionals' Tournament was a golf tournament on the British PGA Circuit that was played from 1968 to 1974. From 1968 to 1971 it was a stroke play tournament for under-23 professionals. In 1968 it was over 72 holes while in 1969 it was reduced to a 54 hole event. From 1972 and 1974 it was a match-play event with the age limit increased to 25. The tournament was supported by Lord Derby, the president of the PGA.

== Winners ==
Year	Winner	Country	Venue	Score	Margin of victory	Runner(s)-up	Winner's share (£)	Ref
Lord Derby-Ladbroke Under-25 Match Play Championship
1974	Richard Jewell	England	West Lancashire Golf Club	6 & 5		(England) Paul Herbert	900	
Lord Derby's Under-25 Match Play Championship
1973	Brian Thompson	England	Morecambe Golf Club	2 up		(Scotland) John McTear	450	
1972	Sam Torrance	Scotland	Royal Birkdale Golf Club	5 & 4		(England) Doug McClelland		
Lord Derby's Under-23 Professionals' Tournament
1971	David Vaughan	Wales	Royal Lytham & St Annes Golf Club	218	1 stroke	(England) Noel Hunt (Republic of Ireland) John O'Leary		
1970	Peter Oosterhuis	England	St Annes Old Links	218	5 strokes	(England) Nick Job	170	
1969	Craig Defoy	Wales	Hesketh Golf Club	214	4 strokes	(England) John Garner (England) Keith Ashdown		
1968	Guy Hunt	England	Hillside Golf Club	288	8 strokes	(England) John Garner (Wales) Andrew Phillips	150	
