= 1977 Ryder Cup =

Golf tournament in England

22nd Ryder Cup Matches
- Dates: 15–17 September 1977
- Venue: Royal Lytham & St Annes Golf Club
- Location: Lytham St Annes, England
- Captains: Brian Huggett (GB&I); Dow Finsterwald (USA)
(United Kingdom) (Republic of Ireland)	7 1/2	12 1/2	(United States)
- United States wins the Ryder Cup

Location map
- Location within England

The 22nd Ryder Cup Matches were held at the Royal Lytham & St Annes Golf Club in Lytham St Annes, England. The United States team won the competition by a score of 12 1/2 to 7 1/2 points.

The event was the last time that a Great Britain and Ireland team would compete for the Ryder Cup. During the competition, officials from the PGA of America and the PGA of Great Britain and Ireland discussed the possibility of allowing players from continental Europe to participate in the Cup, and Jack Nicklaus also advocated this change in a meeting with Lord Derby. The Deed of Trust that was struck with the PGA of Great Britain and Samuel Ryder was amended in time for the 1979 matches, and changed the popularity and competitive balance of the Ryder Cup.

== Format ==
The Ryder Cup is a match play event, with each match worth one point. The competition format was reduced in scope from the formats used from 1963 through 1975, with only 20 matches played instead of 32. The schedule of play was as follows:

- Day 1 — 5 foursome (alternate shot) matches
- Day 2 — 5 four-ball (better ball) matches
- Day 3 — 10 singles matches

With a total of 20 points, 10 1/2 points were required to win the Cup. All matches were played to a maximum of 18 holes.

== Teams ==
Team Great Britain and Ireland
Name	Age	Previous Ryder Cups	Matches	W–L–H	Winning percentage
(Wales) Brian Huggett	40	Non-playing captain
(Scotland) Brian Barnes	32	4	17	6–10–1	38.24
(Scotland) Ken Brown	20	0	Rookie
(England) Howard Clark	23	0	Rookie
(England) Neil Coles	42	7	37	12–18–7	41.89
(Republic of Ireland) Eamonn Darcy	25	1	4	0–3–1	12.50
(England) Peter Dawson	27	0	Rookie
(England) Nick Faldo	20	0	Rookie
(Scotland) Bernard Gallacher	28	4	18	7–7–4	50.00
(England) Tommy Horton	36	1	5	1–3–1	30.00
(England) Tony Jacklin	33	5	29	12–11–6	51.72
(England) Mark James	23	0	Rookie
(England) Peter Oosterhuis	29	3	18	9–6–3	58.33

Team USA
Name	Age	Previous Ryder Cups	Matches	W–L–H	Winning percentage
Dow Finsterwald	48	Non-playing captain
Raymond Floyd	35	2	7	1–3–3	35.71
Lou Graham	39	2	6	3–2–1	58.33
Hubert Green	30	0	Rookie
Dave Hill	40	2	7	4–3–0	57.14
Hale Irwin	32	1	5	4–0–1	90.00
Don January	47	1	5	2–2–1	50.00
Jerry McGee	34	0	Rookie
Jack Nicklaus	37	4	21	12–6–3	64.29
Ed Sneed	33	0	Rookie
Dave Stockton	35	1	3	1–1–1	50.00
Lanny Wadkins	27	0	Rookie
Tom Watson	28	0	Rookie

== Thursday's foursome matches ==
	Results
Gallacher/Barnes	(United States) 3 & 1	Wadkins/Irwin
Coles/Dawson	(United States) 1 up	Stockton/McGee
Faldo/Oosterhuis	(United Kingdom) (Republic of Ireland) 2 & 1	Floyd/Graham
Darcy/Jacklin	halved	Sneed/January
Horton/James	(United States) 5 & 4	Nicklaus/Watson
1 1/2	Session	3 1/2
1 1/2	Overall	3 1/2

== Friday's four-ball matches ==
	Results
Barnes/Horton	(United States) 5 & 4	Watson/Green
Coles/Dawson	(United States) 5 & 3	Sneed/Wadkins
Faldo/Oosterhuis	(United Kingdom) (Republic of Ireland) 3 & 1	Nicklaus/Floyd
Jacklin/Darcy	(United States) 5 & 3	Hill/Stockton
James/Brown	(United States) 1 up	Irwin/Graham
1	Session	4
2 1/2	Overall	7 1/2

== Saturday's singles matches ==
	Results
Howard Clark	(United States) 4 & 3	Lanny Wadkins
Neil Coles	(United States) 5 & 3	Lou Graham
Peter Dawson	(United Kingdom) (Republic of Ireland) 5 & 4	Don January
Brian Barnes	(United Kingdom) (Republic of Ireland) 1 up	Hale Irwin
Tommy Horton	(United States) 5 & 4	Dave Hill
Bernard Gallacher	(United Kingdom) (Republic of Ireland) 1 up	Jack Nicklaus
Eamonn Darcy	(United States) 1 up	Hubert Green
Mark James	(United States) 2 & 1	Raymond Floyd
Nick Faldo	(United Kingdom) (Republic of Ireland) 1 up	Tom Watson
Peter Oosterhuis	(United Kingdom) (Republic of Ireland) 2 up	Jerry McGee
5	Session	5
7 1/2	Overall	12 1/2

== Individual player records ==
Each entry refers to the win–loss–half record of the player.

=== Great Britain and Ireland ===
Player	Points	Overall	Singles	Foursomes	Fourballs
Brian Barnes	1	1–2–0	1–0–0	0–1–0	0–1–0
Ken Brown	0	0–1–0	0–0–0	0–0–0	0–1–0
Howard Clark	0	0–1–0	0–1–0	0–0–0	0–0–0
Neil Coles	0	0–3–0	0–1–0	0–1–0	0–1–0
Eamonn Darcy	0.5	0–2–1	0–1–0	0–0–1	0–1–0
Peter Dawson	1	1–2–0	1–0–0	0–1–0	0–1–0
Nick Faldo	3	3–0–0	1–0–0	1–0–0	1–0–0
Bernard Gallacher	1	1–1–0	1–0–0	0–1–0	0–0–0
Tommy Horton	0	0–3–0	0–1–0	0–1–0	0–1–0
Tony Jacklin	0.5	0–1–1	0–0–0	0–0–1	0–1–0
Mark James	0	0–3–0	0–1–0	0–1–0	0–1–0
Peter Oosterhuis	3	3–0–0	1–0–0	1–0–0	1–0–0

=== United States ===
Player	Points	Overall	Singles	Foursomes	Fourballs
Raymond Floyd	1	1–2–0	1–0–0	0–1–0	0–1–0
Lou Graham	2	2–1–0	1–0–0	0–1–0	1–0–0
Hubert Green	2	2–0–0	1–0–0	0–0–0	1–0–0
Dave Hill	2	2–0–0	1–0–0	0–0–0	1–0–0
Hale Irwin	2	2–1–0	0–1–0	1–0–0	1–0–0
Don January	0.5	0–1–1	0–1–0	0–0–1	0–0–0
Jerry McGee	1	1–1–0	0–1–0	1–0–0	0–0–0
Jack Nicklaus	1	1–2–0	0–1–0	1–0–0	0–1–0
Ed Sneed	1.5	1–0–1	0–0–0	0–0–1	1–0–0
Dave Stockton	2	2–0–0	0–0–0	1–0–0	1–0–0
Lanny Wadkins	3	3–0–0	1–0–0	1–0–0	1–0–0
Tom Watson	2	2–1–0	0–1–0	1–0–0	1–0–0
