= Lou Graham =

American professional golfer (1938–2026)

Personal information
- Full name: Louis Krebs Graham
- Nationality: United States
- Born: January 7, 1938 Nashville, Tennessee, U.S.
- Died: May 11, 2026 (aged 88) Nashville, Tennessee, U.S.
- Height: 6 ft 0 in (1.83 m)
- Weight: 175 lb (79 kg; 12.5 st)

Career
- Sport: Golf
- College: Memphis State University
- Turned professional: 1964
- Former tours: PGA Tour; Senior PGA Tour
- Professional wins: 7

Number of wins by tour
- PGA Tour: 6
- Other: 1

Best results in major championships
- Masters Tournament: T6: 1977
- PGA Championship: T6: 1977
- U.S. Open: Won: 1975
- The Open Championship: T47: 1975

Louis Krebs Graham (January 7, 1938 – May 11, 2026) was an American professional golfer. He won six PGA Tour tournaments including the 1975 U.S. Open.

== Early life ==
In 1938, Graham was born in Nashville, Tennessee. He started playing golf when he was seven years old and grew up caddying at Shelby Golf Course, Nashville. He attended Nashville's Father Ryan High School.

Graham attended Memphis State University. He played on the golf team for three years.

Later, Graham was drafted into the U.S. Army. While in the Army, Graham served as a member of the Old Guard—Company E of the Third U.S. Infantry Regiment—the ceremonial Honor Guard that guards the Tomb of the Unknown Soldier in Arlington National Cemetery. During his Army career, he made the Army golf team that won the Inter-Service championship in 1961.

== Professional career ==
In September 1964, Graham joined the PGA Tour. His first win was at the 1967 Minnesota Golf Classic at Hazeltine National Golf Club during his third full year on the tour. In 1972, Graham won again at the Liggett Myers Open, followed by the U.S. Open in 1975. Graham had only three wins in fifteen years, and then in 1979, he won three more times in the space of eleven weeks. For this achievement, he won Golf Digest's 1979 Comeback of the Year award.

Graham played on three Ryder Cup teams (1973, 1975, 1977), and was a member of the victorious 1975 World Cup Team. During his career, he made 623 starts and won over $1.4 million on the PGA Tour.

His greatest success in major championships came at the U.S. Open. He won in 1975 at the Medinah Country Club in Medinah, Illinois beating John Mahaffey by two strokes in a playoff. At the 1977 U.S. Open, he finished second – losing by one stroke to Hubert Green at Southern Hills Country Club in Tulsa, Oklahoma. He also had a previous T-3 finish at the 1974 U.S. Open.

After turning 50 in 1988, Graham played on the Senior PGA Tour, were he made 239 starts and won over $600,000 in Senior Tour career earnings. His best finish was 3rd and tied 3rd which he achieved on six occasions.

Graham was a member of Richland Country Club, Nashville, Tennessee.

== Death ==
Graham died on May 11, 2026, at the age of 88, being in hospice care.

== Awards and honors ==
- In 1979, Graham won Golf Digest's Comeback of the Year award.
- In 1991, he was inducted as a charter member of the Tennessee Golf Hall of Fame.
- Graham was inducted into the Tennessee Sports Hall of Fame in 1996.
- In 2019, he was inducted as a charter member of the Father Ryan High School Athletics Hall of Fame.
- In 2025, The Tennessean listed Graham among Nashville's 50 greatest athletes of all time.

== Professional wins (7) ==
=== PGA Tour wins (6) ===
Legend
Major championships (1)
Other PGA Tour (5)

No.	Date	Tournament	Winning score	Margin of victory	Runner(s)-up
1	Jul 30, 1967	Minnesota Golf Classic	−2 (76-68-70-72=286)	1 stroke	(South Africa) Bobby Verwey
2	Aug 27, 1972	Liggett & Myers Open	−3 (71-74-70-70=285)	Playoff	(Australia) David Graham, (United States) Hale Irwin, (United States) Larry Ziegler
3	Jun 23, 1975	U.S. Open	+3 (74-72-68-73=287)	Playoff	(United States) John Mahaffey
4	Jul 22, 1979	IVB-Philadelphia Golf Classic	−11 (68-70-71-64=273)	Playoff	(United States) Bobby Wadkins
5	Sep 9, 1979	American Optical Classic	−9 (68-67-71-69=275)	1 stroke	(United States) Ben Crenshaw
6	Oct 7, 1979	San Antonio Texas Open	−12 (69-64-69-66=268)	1 stroke	(United States) Eddie Pearce, (United States) Bill Rogers, (United States) Doug Tewell

PGA Tour playoff record (3–1)

No.	Year	Tournament	Opponent(s)	Result
1	1971	Greater Hartford Open	(United States) George Archer, (United States) J. C. Snead	Archer won with birdie on first extra hole
2	1972	Liggett & Myers Open	(Australia) David Graham, (United States) Hale Irwin, (United States) Larry Ziegler	Won with birdie on third extra hole D. Graham and Ziegler eliminated by par on first hole
3	1975	U.S. Open	(United States) John Mahaffey	Won 18-hole playoff; Graham: E (71), Mahaffey: +2 (73)
4	1979	IVB-Philadelphia Golf Classic	(United States) Bobby Wadkins	Won with birdie on first extra hole

=== Other wins (1) ===
No.	Date	Tournament	Winning score	Margin of victory	Runners-up
1	Dec 7, 1975	World Cup (with (United States) Johnny Miller)	−22 (134-142-140-138=554)	10 strokes	Taiwan − Hsieh Min-Nan and Kuo Chie-Hsiung

== Major championships ==
=== Wins (1) ===
Year	Championship	54 holes	Winning score	Margin	Runner-up
1975	U.S. Open	4 shot deficit	+3 (74-72-68-73=287)	Playoff^{1}	(United States) John Mahaffey

^{1}Defeated Mahaffey in an 18-hole playoff – Graham 71 (E), Mahaffey 73 (+2).

=== Results timeline ===
Tournament	1963	1964	1965	1966	1967	1968	1969
Masters Tournament							CUT
U.S. Open	CUT	CUT	23	CUT	T28		
The Open Championship							
PGA Championship						T8	CUT

Tournament	1970	1971	1972	1973	1974	1975	1976	1977	1978	1979
Masters Tournament		CUT		T17	CUT	T40	T12	T6	CUT	T23
U.S. Open	T46	T37	T19	CUT	T3	1	T28	2	T35	T25
The Open Championship						T47				
PGA Championship	T22	CUT	T33	T30	T48	T54	T22	T6	CUT	T10

Tournament	1980	1981	1982	1983	1984	1985
Masters Tournament	T26					
U.S. Open	T51	CUT	T39	T50	CUT	CUT
The Open Championship						
PGA Championship	CUT	CUT		T42		

Win
Top 10
Did not play

CUT = missed the halfway cut
"T" indicates a tie for a place.

=== Summary ===
Tournament	Wins	2nd	3rd	Top-5	Top-10	Top-25	Events	Cuts made
Masters Tournament	0	0	0	0	1	4	10	6
U.S. Open	1	1	1	3	3	6	21	14
The Open Championship	0	0	0	0	0	0	1	1
PGA Championship	0	0	0	0	3	5	15	10
Totals	1	1	1	3	7	15	47	31

- Most consecutive cuts made – 11 (1974 U.S. Open – 1977 U.S. Open)
- Longest streak of top-10s – 3 (1977 Masters – 1977 PGA)

== Results in The Players Championship ==
Tournament	1974	1975	1976	1977	1978	1979	1980	1981	1982	1983	1984	1985
The Players Championship	5	T29	T56	T61	2	T43	T60	72	T70	WD	CUT	CUT

Top 10

CUT = missed the halfway cut
WD = withdrew
"T" indicates a tie for a place

== U.S. national team appearances ==
Professional

- Ryder Cup: 1973 (winners), 1975 (winners), 1977 (winners)
- World Cup: 1975 (winners)
