= 1975 World Cup (men's golf) =

Coordinates: 13.805242°N 100.697229°E

Tournament information
- Dates: 4–7 December
- Location: Bangkok, Thailand
- Course: Navatanee Course
- Format: 72 holes stroke play combined score

Statistics
- Par: 72
- Length: 6,904 yards (6,313 m)
- Field: 47 two-man teams
- Cut: None
- Prize fund: US$6,300 $4,200 team $2,100 individual
- Winner's share: $2,000 team $1,000 individual

Champion
- United States; Lou Graham & Johnny Miller
- 554 (−22)

Location map
- Location in Southeast Asia Location in Thailand Location in Bangkok

The 1975 World Cup took place 4–7 December at the Navatananee Course in Khan Na Yao district, 20 kilometres northeast of Bangkok city center in Thailand. It was the 23rd World Cup event. The tournament was a 72-hole stroke play team event with 47 teams of which 45 teams completed the competition. Each team consisted of two players from a country. The combined score of each team determined the team results. The United States team of Lou Graham and Johnny Miller won by ten strokes over the Taiwan team of Hsieh Min-Nan and Kuo Chie-Hsiung. It was the 13th win for United States in the 23 times the World Cup, formerly named Canada Cup, had been contested. The individual competition for The International Trophy, was won by Miller, two strokes ahead of three players, who shared second place.

== Teams ==
Country	Players
Argentina	Juan Cabrera and Jorge Soto
Australia	Bob Shearer and Ian Stanley
Austria	Oswald Gartenmaier and Rudolf Hauser
Belgium	Sylvain Bouillon and Philippe Toussaint
Brazil	Luis Pinto and Antonio Evangelista
Burma	Mya Aye and Maung Shein
Canada	Bob Panasiuk and Bill Tape
Chile	Francisco Cerda and Natalio Morales
Colombia	Juan Pinson and Heraclio Velenzuala
Denmark	Per Greve and Herluf Hansen
Egypt	Adbel Halim and Mohamed Said Moussa
England	Maurice Bembridge and Guy Hunt
France	Jean Garaïalde and Bernard Pascassio
Greece	John Sotiropoulos and George Vafiadis (a)
Hong Kong	Joe Hardwick and Peter Tang
Indonesia	Azis Harwi and Sumarno (a)
Ireland	Christy O'Connor Snr and Christy O'Connor Jnr
Italy	Roberto Bernardini and Pietro Molteni
Jamaica	Norman Marsh and Seymour Rose
Japan	Takashi Murakami and Kosaku Shimada
Libya	Mohamed Salah and Muftah Salem
Malaysia	Bobby Lim Yat Foong and Zainal Abidin Yusof
Mexico	Ernesto Perez Acosta and Margarito Martinez
Morocco	Hamid Balghiti and Fatmi Moussa
Netherlands	Jan Dorrestein and Martien Groenendaal
Nepal	Bismu Shahi (a) and Ghanashyam Thapa
New Zealand	Walter Godfrey and Howard Kennedy
Nigeria	Jaimi Oyebajo and Patrick Okpomu
Pakistan	Taimur Hassan (a) and Muhammad Shafique (a)
Philippines	Ben Arda and Eleuterio Nival
Portugal	Antonio Barnabe and Joaguin Rodrigues
Puerto Rico	Jesús Rodríguez and Jose Rivera
Scotland	Brian Barnes and Norman Wood
Singapore	Lim Swee Chew and Liam Leng Ann
South Africa	John Bland and Tienie Britz
South Korea	Cho Tae-woon and Park Jung–ung
Spain	Seve Ballesteros and Ángel Gallardo
Sri Lanka	W.P. Fernando and H.L. Premadasa
Sweden	Bengt Malmqvist and Gunnar Mueller
Switzerland	Franco Salmini and Fausto Schiroli
Taiwan	Hsieh Min-Nan and Kuo Chie-Hsiung
Thailand	Sukree Onsham and Adul Thappavibul
United States	Lou Graham and Johnny Miller
Venezuela	Julian Santana and Ramón Muñoz
Wales	Simon Cox and Craig Defoy
West Germany	Karl-Heinz Gögele and Gerhard Koenig
Yugoslavia	Mirko Vovk (a) and Rafael Jerman

(a) denotes amateur

== Scores ==
Team

Place	Country	Score	To par	Money (US$)
1	United States	134-142-140-138=554	−22	2,000
2	Taiwan	140-136-141-147=564	−12	1,000
3	Japan	144-140-144-137=565	−11	800
4	Australia	144-136-138-148=566	−10	400
5	Argentina	138-143-141-149=571	−5	
6	Philippines	140-139-145-149=573	−3	
7	Thailand	142-149-140-143=574	−2	
8	Brazil	148-145-137-147=577	+1	
9	South Korea	143-145-148-142=578	+2	
10	England	147-153-137-142=579	+3	
11	Mexico	151-143-140-146=580	+4	
12	Chile	152-143-148-143=586	+10	
T13	Ireland	143-147-156-141=587	+11	
T13	New Zealand	146-155-144-142=587	+11	
T13	Scotland	149-145-148-145=587	+11	
T13	South Africa	145-148-142-152=587	+11	
17	France	147-145-149-148=589	+13	
18	Spain	157-141-142-150=590	+14	
19	Austria	152-146-149-145=592	+16	
20	Greece	146-151-151-145=593	+17	
21	Burma	145-147-152-151=595	+19	
22	Denmark	145-149-147-155=596	+20	
23	Singapore	159-148-143-147=597	+21	
24	Italy	150-151-150-147=598	+22	
T25	Colombia	149-147-149-154=599	+23	
T25	Egypt	145-152-149-153=599	+23	
T25	Puerto Rico	148-140-149-162=599	+23	
28	Pakistan	159-145-146-150=600	+24	
29	Wales	152-147-152-151=602	+26	
30	Malaysia	146-149-152-156=603	+27	
31	Indonesia	145-158-148-153=604	+28	
32	Canada	149-151-154-151=605	+29	
33	West Germany	163-143-147-153=606	+30	
34	Sweden	154-145-160-150=609	+33	
35	Belgium	159-153-152-148=612	+36	
36	Sri Lanka	164-153-144-154=615	+39	
T37	Jamaica	156-153-155-158=622	+46	
T37	Switzerland	165-153-148-156=622	+46	
T39	Hong Kong	157-157-163-156=633	+57	
T39	Morocco	158-156-161-158=633	+57	
41	Nigeria	166-170-158-164=658	+82	
42	Portugal	180-167-170-163=680	+104	
43	Libya	167-178-170-177=692	+116	
44	Nepal	183-181-181-167=712	+136	
45	Yugoslavia	198-189-179-213=779	+203	
WD	Netherlands	164-151-WD		
WD	Venezuela	151-145-WD		

International Trophy

Place	Player	Country	Score	To par	Money (US$)
1	Johnny Miller	United States	66-71-70-68=275	−13	1,000
T2	Ben Arda	Philippines	67-68-69-73=277	−11	366
T2	Hsieh Min-Nan	Taiwan	68-68-68-73=277	−11	366
T2	Bob Shearer	Australia	74-68-66-69=277	−11	366
5	Lou Graham	United States	68-71-70-70=279	−9	
6	Takashi Murakami	Japan	70-69-72-69=280	−8	
7	Mya Aye	Burma	72-71-68-70=281	−7	
T8	Sukree Onsham	Thailand	69-75-67-72=283	−5	
T8	Park Jung-ung	South Korea	72-71-73-67=283	−5	
T10	Maurice Bembridge	England	75-74-66-69=284	−4	
T10	Juan Cabrera	Argentina	67-70-71-76=284	−4	
T10	Ernesto Perez Acosta	Mexico	71-71-68-74=284	−4	
