= 1977 World Cup (men's golf) =

Tournament information
- Dates: December 8–11
- Location: Mandaluyong, Philippines; 14.58°N 121.03°E
- Courses: Wack Wack Golf and Country Club; East Course
- Format: 72 holes stroke play combined score

Statistics
- Par: 72
- Length: 7,734 yards (7,072 m)
- Field: 50 two-man teams
- Cut: None
- Prize fund: US$6,300 $4,200 team $2,100 individual
- Winner's share: $2,000 team $1,000 individual

Champion
- Spain; Seve Ballesteros & Antonio Garrido
- 591 (+15)

Location map
- Location in Asia Location in the Philippines Location in Manila

The 1977 World Cup took place December 8–11 at the Wack Wack Golf and Country Club in Manila, Philippines. It was the 25th World Cup event. The tournament was a 72-hole stroke play team event with 50 teams. The Mexico team of Ernesto Perez Acosta and Victor Regalado did not arrive on time to start and were replaced by a Filipino amateur team of Tommy Manotoc and Emilio Tuazon. Each team consisted of two players from a country. The combined score of each team determined the team results. The Spanish team of Seve Ballesteros and Antonio Garrido successfully defended the title Spain won in 1976 and won by two strokes over the Philippines team of Ben Arda and Rudy Lavares. The individual competition for The International Trophy, was won by Gary Player of South Africa, three strokes ahead of Lavares and Hubert Green, United States.

== Teams ==
Country	Players
Argentina	Juan Carlos Cabrera and Juan Carlos Molina
Australia	Mike Cahill and David Good
Austria	Oswald Gartenmaier and Rudolph Hauser
Belgium	Michael Eaton and Philippe Toussaint
Brazil	Luis Carlos Pinto and Laurenco Evangelista
Burma	Mya Aye and Maung Shein
Canada	Dave Barr and George Knudson
Chile	Francisco Cerda and Natalio Morales
Colombia	Eduardo Martinez and Juan Pinzon
Czechoslovakia	Jiri Dvorak and Jan Kunsta
Denmark	Per Greve and Herluf Hansen
Egypt	Mohamed Abdel Halim and Mohamed Said Moussa
England	Peter Dawson and Nick Faldo
Fiji	Bose Lutunatabua and Veramu Rokotavaga
France	Patrick Cotton and Jean Garaïalde
Greece	Basilli Anastassiou (a) and Basilli Karatzas (a)
Guatemala	Roberto Galindo and Hilario Polo
Hong Kong	Lai Wai Che and Peter Tang
Iceland	Ragnar Olafsson (a) and Björgvin Thorsteinsson (a)
Indonesia	Azis Narwi and Sumarno (a)
Ireland	Eamonn Darcy and Eddie Polland
Israel	Laurie Been (a) and Barry Mandel (a)
Italy	Silvano Locatelli and Delio Lovato
Japan	Seiichi Kanai and Kosaku Shimada
Libya	Muftah Salem and Mohamed Salah Ziany
Malaysia	Lim Yat Foong and V. Nellan
Morocco	Mohamed Makroune and Ahmed Messaoud
Nepal	Bishnu Shahi and Ghanashyam Thapa
Netherlands	Jan Dorrestein and Martien Groenendaal
New Zealand	Dennis Clark and Richard Coombes
Nigeria	Peter Akakasiaka and Ahmadu Baba
Pakistan	Mohammad Ejaz and Taimur Hassan
Philippines	Ben Arda and Rudy Lavares
Philippines	Tommy Manotoc (a) and Emilio Tuazon (a)
Portugal	Domingos Silva and Joachim Rodrigues
Puerto Rico	Manuel Camacho and Jesús Rodríguez
Scotland	Brian Barnes and Ken Brown
Singapore	Lim Swee Wah and Lim Kian Tiong
South Africa	Hugh Baiocchi and Gary Player
South Korea	Han Chang-sang and Kim Seung-hack
Spain	Seve Ballesteros and Antonio Garrido
Sweden	Hans Hedjerson and Jan Sonnevi
Switzerland	Dennis Maina and Franco Salmina
Taiwan	Kuo Chie-Hsiung and Hsieh Min-Nan
Thailand	Uthai Dhappavibul and Nares Navin
United States	Hubert Green and Lanny Wadkins
Venezuela	Francisco Gonzales and Ramón Muñoz
Wales	Craig Defoy and David Vaughan
West Germany	Wolfgang Jersombeck and Bernhard Langer
Yugoslavia	Rafael Jerman (a) and Mirko Vovk (a)

(a) denotes amateur

== Scores ==
Team

Place	Country	Score	To par	Money (US$)
1	Spain	144-154-142-151=591	+15	2,000
2	Philippines	149-142-156-147=594	+18	1,000
3	Canada	139-147-157-152=595	+19	800
T4	Japan	151-148-146-152=597	+21	400
T4	South Africa	149-141-154-153=597	+21	400
T6	Ireland	149-141-154-153=597	+22	
T6	Taiwan	151-151-147-149=598	+22	
8	United States	143-153-155-150=601	+25	
9	South Korea	144-155-152-152=603	+27	
10	Egypt	145-151-158-154=608	+32	
11	Malaysia	150-153-158-149=610	+34	
12	Italy	148-151-150-162=611	+35	
T13	Australia	159-148-155-150=612	+36	
T13	New Zealand	151-147-154-160=612	+36	
T15	Brazil	154-147-159-155=615	+39	
T15	Colombia	155-151-155-154=615	+39	
T15	Thailand	150-153-156-156=615	+39	
18	Scotland	151-153-164-151=619	+43	
19	Burma	158-156-152-154=620	+44	
T20	England	152-153-155-161=621	+45	
T20	Wales	153-152-164-152=621	+45	
22	Puerto Rico	155-154-158-158=625	+49	
T23	Hong Kong	153-160-153-163=629	+53	
T23	Sweden	159-153-153-164=629	+53	
25	Belgium	159-152-163-158=632	+56	
26	Denmark	153-161-165-154=633	+57	
T27	Argentina	154-164-161-155=634	+58	
T27	Singapore	165-158-153-158=634	+58	
T29	Pakistan	154-165-157-161=637	+61	
T29	Philippines (a)	164-161-158-154=637	+61	
31	Venezuela	156-169-155-160=640	+64	
32	France	167-166-154-156=643	+67	
33	Indonesia	160-155-162-167=644	+68	
34	West Germany	162-160-163-160=645	+69	
35	Chile	162-165-157-163=647	+71	
36	Austria	167-164-158-161=650	+74	
T37	Guatemala	159-160-165-167=651	+75	
T37	Morocco	163-165-163-160=651	+75	
39	Fiji	162-156-170-165=653	+77	
40	Switzerland	159-176-162-159=656	+80	
41	Netherlands	163-172-160-162=657	+81	
42	Greece	168-163-168-161=660	+84	
43	Portugal	166-167-172-167=672	+96	
44	Iceland	160-177-171-167=675	+99	
45	Israel	164-164-184-170=682	+106	
46	Nigeria	177-169-172-167=685	+109	
47	Czechoslovakia	176-171-173-172=692	+116	
48	Libya	183-180-173-168=704	+128	
49	Nepal	172-184-184-189=729	+153	
50	Yugoslavia	180-190-184-178=732	+156	

International Trophy

Place	Player	Country	Score	To par	Money US$
1	Gary Player	South Africa	72-68-73-76=289	+1	1,000
T2	Hubert Green	United States	69-72-77-74=292	+4	450
T2	Rudy Lavares	Philippines	73-69-77-73=292	+4	450
4	Seiichi Kanai	Japan	75-73-73-72=293	+5	200
5	George Knudson	Canada	69-72-78-75=294	+6	
T6	Seve Ballesteros	Spain	73-77-69-76=295	+7	
T6	Kuo Chie-Hsiung	Taiwan	73-75-72-75=295	+7	
8	Antonio Garrido	Spain	71-77-73-75=296	+8	
9	Eddie Polland	Ireland	78-76-74-70=298	+10	
10	Mya Aye	Burma	76-72-75-76=299	+11	
