= 1975 Ryder Cup =

Golf tournament

21st Ryder Cup Matches
- Dates: September 19–21, 1975
- Venue: Laurel Valley Golf Club
- Location: Ligonier, Pennsylvania
- Captains: Arnold Palmer (USA); Bernard Hunt (GB&I)
(United States)	21	11	(United Kingdom) (Republic of Ireland)
- United States wins the Ryder Cup

Location map
- Location within Pennsylvania

The 21st Ryder Cup Matches were held September 19–21 at Laurel Valley Golf Club in Ligonier, Pennsylvania. The United States team won the competition by a score of 21 to 11 points. After the competition, questions started to be asked about the future of the event, as Britain and Ireland had once again failed to seriously challenge the United States team. The next time the competition was held in the U.S. in 1979, the visiting team included players from continental Europe.

Laurel Valley was co-founded by U.S. captain Arnold Palmer and had hosted the PGA Championship a decade earlier, in 1965.

== Format ==
The Ryder Cup is a match play event, with each match worth one point. The competition format was adjusted slightly from the 1973 Ryder Cup, with the second day sessions being swapped:

- Day 1 — 4 foursome (alternate shot) matches in a morning session and 4 four-ball (better ball) matches in an afternoon session
- Day 2 — 4 four-ball matches in a morning session and 4 foursome matches in an afternoon session
- Day 3 — 16 singles matches, 8 each in morning and afternoon sessions

With a total of 32 points, 16 1/2 points were required to win the Cup. All matches were played to a maximum of 18 holes.

== Teams ==
Team USA
Name	Age	Previous Ryder Cups	Matches	W–L–H	Winning percentage
Arnold Palmer	46	Non-playing captain
Billy Casper	44	7	33	18–9–6	63.64
Raymond Floyd	33	1	4	0–2–2	25.00
Al Geiberger	38	1	5	3–1–1	70.00
Lou Graham	37	1	2	0–1–1	25.00
Hale Irwin	30	0	Rookie
Gene Littler	45	6	24	11–5–8	62.50
Johnny Miller	28	0	Rookie
Bob Murphy	32	0	Rookie
Jack Nicklaus	35	3	16	10–4–2	68.75
J. C. Snead	34	2	8	7–1–0	87.50
Lee Trevino	35	3	17	9–4–4	64.71
Tom Weiskopf	32	1	6	3–2–1	58.33

Eight members of the Great Britain and Ireland team were chosen from the money leaders in 1975 European Tour events after the Benson & Hedges Festival on 16 August, with the remaining four members of the 12-man team selected by a committee. The eight automatic selections were: Eamonn Darcy, Maurice Bembridge, Brian Barnes, Bernard Gallacher, Norman Wood, John O'Leary, Guy Hunt and Brian Huggett. The committee chose two US-based players, Tony Jacklin and Peter Oosterhuis, together with Christy O'Connor Jnr and Tommy Horton. Horton was selected despite finishing 15th in the points list, making his debut at the age of 34.

Neil Coles withdrew from consideration because of his fear of flying and because it was impractical to travel by sea.

Team Great Britain and Ireland
Name	Age	Previous Ryder Cups	Matches	W–L–H	Winning percentage
(England) Bernard Hunt	45	Non-playing captain
(Scotland) Brian Barnes	30	3	12	4–8–0	33.33
(England) Maurice Bembridge	30	3	13	5–5–3	50.00
(Republic of Ireland) Eamonn Darcy	23	0	Rookie
(Scotland) Bernard Gallacher	26	3	13	7–5–1	57.69
(England) Tommy Horton	34	0	Rookie
(Wales) Brian Huggett	38	5	23	8–9–6	47.83
(England) Guy Hunt	28	0	Rookie
(England) Tony Jacklin	31	4	23	10–8–5	54.35
(Republic of Ireland) Christy O'Connor Jnr	27	0	Rookie
(Republic of Ireland) John O'Leary	26	0	Rookie
(England) Peter Oosterhuis	27	2	12	6–4–2	58.33
(Scotland) Norman Wood	28	0	Rookie

== Friday's matches ==
=== Morning foursomes ===
	Results
Barnes/Gallacher	(United States) 5 & 4	Nicklaus/Weiskopf
Wood/Bembridge	(United States) 4 & 3	Littler/Irwin
Jacklin/Oosterhuis	(United States) 3 & 1	Geiberger/Miller
Horton/O'Leary	(United States) 2 & 1	Trevino/Snead
0	Session	4
0	Overall	4

=== Afternoon four-ball ===
	Results
Oosterhuis/Jacklin	(United Kingdom) (Republic of Ireland) 2 & 1	Casper/Floyd
Darcy/O'Connor	(United States) 3 & 2	Weiskopf/Graham
Barnes/Gallacher	halved	Nicklaus/Murphy
Horton/O'Leary	(United States) 2 & 1	Trevino/Irwin
1 1/2	Session	2 1/2
1 1/2	Overall	6 1/2

== Saturday's matches ==
=== Morning four-ball ===
	Results
Oosterhuis/Jacklin	halved	Casper/Miller
Horton/Wood	(United States) 4 & 2	Nicklaus/Snead
Barnes/Gallacher	(United States) 5 & 3	Littler/Graham
Darcy/Hunt	halved	Geiberger/Floyd
1	Session	3
2 1/2	Overall	9 1/2

=== Afternoon foursomes ===
	Results
Jacklin/Huggett	(United Kingdom) (Republic of Ireland) 3 & 2	Trevino/Murphy
O'Connor/O'Leary	(United States) 5 & 3	Weiskopf/Miller
Oosterhuis/Bembridge	(United States) 3 & 2	Irwin/Casper
Darcy/Hunt	(United States) 3 & 2	Geiberger/Graham
1	Session	3
3 1/2	Overall	12 1/2

== Sunday's matches ==
=== Morning singles ===
	Results
Tony Jacklin	(United States) 2 & 1	Bob Murphy
Peter Oosterhuis	(United Kingdom) (Republic of Ireland) 2 up	Johnny Miller
Bernard Gallacher	halved	Lee Trevino
Tommy Horton	halved	Hale Irwin
Brian Huggett	(United States) 4 & 2	Gene Littler
Eamonn Darcy	(United States) 3 & 2	Billy Casper
Guy Hunt	(United States) 5 & 3	Tom Weiskopf
Brian Barnes	(United Kingdom) (Republic of Ireland) 4 & 2	Jack Nicklaus
3	Session	5
6 1/2	Overall	17 1/2

=== Afternoon singles ===
	Results
Tony Jacklin	(United States) 1 up	Raymond Floyd
Peter Oosterhuis	(United Kingdom) (Republic of Ireland) 3 & 2	J. C. Snead
Bernard Gallacher	halved	Al Geiberger
Tommy Horton	(United Kingdom) (Republic of Ireland) 2 & 1	Lou Graham
John O'Leary	(United States) 2 & 1	Hale Irwin
Maurice Bembridge	(United States) 2 & 1	Bob Murphy
Norman Wood	(United Kingdom) (Republic of Ireland) 2 & 1	Lee Trevino
Brian Barnes	(United Kingdom) (Republic of Ireland) 2 & 1	Jack Nicklaus
4 1/2	Session	3 1/2
11	Overall	21

== Individual player records ==
Each entry refers to the win–loss–half record of the player.

=== United States ===
Player	Points	Overall	Singles	Foursomes	Fourballs
Billy Casper	2.5	2–1–1	1–0–0	1–0–0	0–1–1
Raymond Floyd	1.5	1–1–1	1–0–0	0–0–0	0–1–1
Al Geiberger	3	2–0–2	0–0–1	2–0–0	0–0–1
Lou Graham	3	3–1–0	0–1–0	1–0–0	2–0–0
Hale Irwin	4.5	4–0–1	1–0–1	2–0–0	1–0–0
Gene Littler	3	3–0–0	1–0–0	1–0–0	1–0–0
Johnny Miller	2.5	2–1–1	0–1–0	2–0–0	0–0–1
Bob Murphy	2.5	2–1–1	2–0–0	0–1–0	0–0–1
Jack Nicklaus	2.5	2–2–1	0–2–0	1–0–0	1–0–1
J. C. Snead	2	2–1–0	0–1–0	1–0–0	1–0–0
Lee Trevino	2.5	2–2–1	0–1–1	1–1–0	1–0–0
Tom Weiskopf	4	4–0–0	1–0–0	2–0–0	1–0–0

=== Great Britain and Ireland ===
Player	Points	Overall	Singles	Foursomes	Fourballs
Brian Barnes	2.5	2–2–1	2–0–0	0–1–0	0–1–1
Maurice Bembridge	0	0–3–0	0–1–0	0–2–0	0–0–0
Eamonn Darcy	0.5	0–3–1	0–1–0	0–1–0	0–1–1
Bernard Gallacher	1.5	0–2–3	0–0–2	0–1–0	0–1–1
Tommy Horton	1.5	1–3–1	1–0–1	0–1–0	0–2–0
Brian Huggett	1	1–1–0	0–1–0	1–0–0	0–0–0
Guy Hunt	0.5	0–2–1	0–1–0	0–1–0	0–0–1
Tony Jacklin	2.5	2–3–1	0–2–0	1–1–0	1–0–1
Christy O'Connor	0	0–2–0	0–0–0	0–1–0	0–1–0
John O'Leary	0	0–4–0	0–1–0	0–2–0	0–1–0
Peter Oosterhuis	3.5	3–2–1	2–0–0	0–2–0	1–0–1
Norman Wood	1	1–2–0	1–0–0	0–1–0	0–1–0
