= List of American Ryder Cup golfers =

This is a list of all the 201 American golfers who have played in the Ryder Cup through 2025. Phil Mickelson holds the record with 12 appearances.

== Players ==
Player	Editions
Tommy Aaron	1969, 1973
Skip Alexander	1949, 1951
Paul Azinger	1989, 1991, 1993, 2002
Jerry Barber	1955, 1961
Miller Barber	1969, 1971
Herman Barron	1947
Andy Bean	1979, 1987
Frank Beard	1969, 1971
Chip Beck	1989, 1991, 1993
Daniel Berger	2021
Homero Blancas	1973
Tommy Bolt	1955, 1957
Julius Boros	1959, 1963, 1965, 1967
Keegan Bradley	2012, 2014
Gay Brewer	1967, 1973
Billy Burke	1931, 1933
Jack Burke Jr.	1951, 1953, 1955, 1957, 1959^
Walter Burkemo	1953
Sam Burns	2023, 2025
Mark Calcavecchia	1987, 1989, 1991, 2002
Chad Campbell	2004, 2006, 2008
Patrick Cantlay	2021, 2023, 2025
Billy Casper	1961, 1963, 1965, 1967, 1969, 1971, 1973, 1975
Stewart Cink	2002, 2004, 2006, 2008, 2010
Wyndham Clark	2023
Bill Collins	1961
Charles Coody	1971
John Cook	1993
Fred Couples	1989, 1991, 1993, 1995, 1997
Wiffy Cox	1931
Ben Crenshaw	1981, 1983, 1987, 1995
Ben Curtis	2008
Bryson DeChambeau	2018, 2021, 2025
Jimmy Demaret	1947, 1949, 1951
Gardner Dickinson	1967, 1971
Leo Diegel	1927, 1929, 1931, 1933
Chris DiMarco	2004, 2006
Dave Douglas	1953
Dale Douglass	1969
Ed Dudley	1929, 1933, 1937
Jason Dufner	2012
Olin Dutra	1933, 1935
David Duval	1999, 2002
Lee Elder	1979
Harris English	2021, 2025
Al Espinosa	1927^, 1929, 1931
Johnny Farrell	1927, 1929, 1931
Brad Faxon	1995, 1997
Tony Finau	2018, 2021
Dow Finsterwald	1957, 1959, 1961, 1963
Raymond Floyd	1969, 1975, 1977, 1981, 1983, 1985, 1991, 1993
Doug Ford	1955, 1957, 1959, 1961
Rickie Fowler	2010, 2014, 2016, 2018, 2023
Fred Funk	2004
Ed Furgol	1957
Marty Furgol	1955
Jim Furyk	1997, 1999, 2002, 2004, 2006, 2008, 2010, 2012, 2014
Jim Gallagher Jr.	1993
Al Geiberger	1967, 1975
Bob Gilder	1983
Bob Goalby	1963
Johnny Golden	1927, 1929
Lou Graham	1973, 1975, 1977
Hubert Green	1977, 1979, 1985
Ken Green	1989
Ben Griffin	2025
Ralph Guldahl	1937
Fred Haas	1953
Jay Haas	1983, 1995, 2004
Walter Hagen	1927, 1929, 1931, 1933, 1935
Bob Hamilton	1949
Chick Harbert	1949, 1955
Brian Harman	2023
Chandler Harper	1955
Dutch Harrison	1947, 1949, 1951^
Fred Hawkins	1957
Mark Hayes	1979
Clayton Heafner	1949, 1951
Jay Hebert	1959, 1961
Lionel Hebert	1957
Russell Henley	2025
J. J. Henry	2006
Dave Hill	1969, 1973, 1977
Scott Hoch	1997, 2002
Ben Hogan	1947, 1951
J. B. Holmes	2008, 2016
Max Homa	2023
Hale Irwin	1975, 1977, 1979, 1981, 1991
Tommy Jacobs	1965
Peter Jacobsen	1985, 1995
Don January	1965, 1977
Lee Janzen	1993, 1997
Dustin Johnson	2010, 2012, 2016, 2018, 2021
Zach Johnson	2006, 2010, 2012, 2014, 2016
Herman Keiser	1947
Anthony Kim	2008
Tom Kite	1979, 1981, 1983, 1985, 1987, 1989, 1993
Brooks Koepka	2016, 2018, 2021, 2023
Ted Kroll	1953, 1955, 1957
Matt Kuchar	2010, 2012, 2014, 2016
Ky Laffoon	1935
Tom Lehman	1995, 1997, 1999
Tony Lema	1963, 1965
Justin Leonard	1997, 1999, 2008
Wayne Levi	1991
Bruce Lietzke	1981
Gene Littler	1961, 1963, 1965, 1967, 1969, 1971, 1975
Davis Love III	1993, 1995, 1997, 1999, 2002, 2004
Jeff Maggert	1995, 1997, 1999
John Mahaffey	1979
Hunter Mahan	2008, 2010, 2014
Tony Manero	1937
Lloyd Mangrum	1947, 1949, 1951, 1953
Dave Marr	1965
Billy Maxwell	1963
Dick Mayer	1957
Mark McCumber	1989
Jerry McGee	1977
Bill Mehlhorn	1927
Phil Mickelson	1995, 1997, 1999, 2002, 2004, 2006, 2008, 2010, 2012, 2014, 2016, 2018
Cary Middlecoff	1953, 1955, 1959
Johnny Miller	1975, 1981
Larry Mize	1987
Ryan Moore	2016
Gil Morgan	1979, 1983
Collin Morikawa	2021, 2023, 2025
Bob Murphy	1975
Byron Nelson	1937, 1947
Larry Nelson	1979, 1981, 1987
Bobby Nichols	1967
Jack Nicklaus	1969, 1971, 1973, 1975, 1977, 1981
Andy North	1985
Mark O'Meara	1985, 1989, 1991, 1997, 1999
Ed Oliver	1947, 1951, 1953
Jeff Overton	2010
Arnold Palmer	1961, 1963, 1965, 1967, 1971, 1973
Johnny Palmer	1949
Sam Parks Jr.	1935
Jerry Pate	1981
Steve Pate	1991, 1999
Corey Pavin	1991, 1993, 1995
Calvin Peete	1983, 1985
Kenny Perry	2004, 2008
Henry Picard	1935, 1937
Dan Pohl	1987
Johnny Pott	1963, 1965^, 1967
Dave Ragan	1963
Henry Ransom	1951
Patrick Reed	2014, 2016, 2018
Johnny Revolta	1935, 1937
Chris Riley	2004
Loren Roberts	1995
Chi-Chi Rodríguez	1973
Bill Rogers	1981
Bob Rosburg	1959
Mason Rudolph	1971
Paul Runyan	1933, 1935
Doug Sanders	1967
Gene Sarazen	1927, 1929, 1931, 1933, 1935, 1937
Xander Schauffele	2021, 2023, 2025
Scottie Scheffler	2021, 2023, 2025
Denny Shute	1931, 1933, 1937
Dan Sikes	1969
Scott Simpson	1987
Webb Simpson	2012, 2014, 2018
Horton Smith	1929, 1931^, 1933, 1935, 1937^
J. C. Snead	1971, 1973, 1975
Sam Snead	1937, 1947, 1949, 1951, 1953, 1955, 1959
Brandt Snedeker	2012, 2016
Ed Sneed	1977
Mike Souchak	1959, 1961
J. J. Spaun	2025
Jordan Spieth	2014, 2016, 2018, 2021, 2023
Craig Stadler	1983, 1985
Payne Stewart	1987, 1989, 1991, 1993, 1999
Ken Still	1969
Dave Stockton	1971, 1977
Curtis Strange	1983, 1985, 1987, 1989, 1995
Steve Stricker	2008, 2010, 2012
Hal Sutton	1985, 1987, 1999, 2002
Vaughn Taylor	2006
Justin Thomas	2018, 2021, 2023, 2025
David Toms	2002, 2004, 2006
Lee Trevino	1969, 1971, 1973, 1975, 1979, 1981
Jim Turnesa	1953
Joe Turnesa	1927, 1929
Ken Venturi	1965
Scott Verplank	2002, 2006
Lanny Wadkins	1977, 1979, 1983, 1985, 1987, 1989, 1991, 1993
Jimmy Walker	2014, 2016
Art Wall Jr.	1957, 1959, 1961
Al Watrous	1927, 1929
Bubba Watson	2010, 2012, 2014, 2018
Tom Watson	1977, 1979+, 1981, 1983, 1989
Boo Weekley	2008
Tom Weiskopf	1973, 1975
Brett Wetterich	2006
Craig Wood	1931, 1933, 1935
Tiger Woods	1997, 1999, 2002, 2004, 2006, 2010, 2012, 2018
Lew Worsham	1947
Cameron Young	2025
Fuzzy Zoeller	1979, 1983, 1985

- ^ In the final team but did not play in any matches.
- + Selected or qualified for the team but withdrew and was replaced. Tom Watson left the day before play began to be at the birth of his first child and was replaced by Mark Hayes.

== Playing record ==
W = Matches won, L = Matches lost, H = Matches halved

Player	First year	Last year	Ryder Cups	Matches	Points	Points percentage	Overall			Singles			Foursomes			Fourballs		
Player	First year	Last year	Ryder Cups	Matches	Points	Points percentage	W	L	H	W	L	H	W	L	H	W	L	H
Tommy Aaron	1969	1973	2	6	1.5	25.00%	1	4	1	0	2	0	1	1	0	0	1	1
Skip Alexander	1949	1951	2	2	1	50.00%	1	1	0	1	0	0	0	1	0	0	0	0
Paul Azinger	1989	2002	4	16	6.5	40.63%	5	8	3	2	0	2	2	3	0	1	5	1
Jerry Barber	1955	1961	2	5	1	20.00%	1	4	0	0	3	0	1	1	0	0	0	0
Miller Barber	1969	1971	2	7	2	28.57%	1	4	2	1	1	0	0	3	0	0	0	2
Herman Barron	1947	1947	1	1	1	100.00%	1	0	0	0	0	0	1	0	0	0	0	0
Andy Bean	1979	1987	2	6	4	66.67%	4	2	0	2	0	0	0	1	0	2	1	0
Frank Beard	1969	1971	2	8	3.5	43.75%	2	3	3	0	1	1	0	2	1	2	0	1
Chip Beck	1989	1993	3	9	6.5	72.22%	6	2	1	3	0	0	1	1	1	2	1	0
Daniel Berger	2021	2021	1	3	2	66.67%	2	1	0	1	0	0	1	1	0	0	0	0
Homero Blancas	1973	1973	1	4	2.5	62.50%	2	1	1	1	1	0	0	0	0	1	0	1
Tommy Bolt	1955	1957	2	4	3	75.00%	3	1	0	1	1	0	2	0	0	0	0	0
Julius Boros	1959	1967	4	16	11	68.75%	9	3	4	3	2	1	5	0	2	1	1	1
Keegan Bradley	2012	2014	2	7	4	57.14%	4	3	0	0	2	0	2	1	0	2	0	0
Gay Brewer	1967	1973	2	9	5.5	61.11%	5	3	1	2	1	1	0	1	0	3	1	0
Billy Burke	1931	1933	2	3	3	100.00%	3	0	0	1	0	0	2	0	0	0	0	0
Jack Burke Jr.	1951	1959	5	8	7	87.50%	7	1	0	3	1	0	4	0	0	0	0	0
Walter Burkemo	1953	1953	1	1	0	0.00%	0	1	0	0	0	0	0	1	0	0	0	0
Sam Burns	2023	2025	2	6	2	33.33%	1	3	2	0	1	1	0	1	0	1	1	1
Mark Calcavecchia	1987	2002	4	14	6.5	46.43%	6	7	1	1	2	1	4	1	0	1	4	0
Chad Campbell	2004	2008	3	9	4	44.44%	3	4	2	2	1	0	1	1	2	0	2	0
Patrick Cantlay	2021	2025	3	13	7	53.85%	6	5	2	2	1	0	3	3	0	1	1	2
Billy Casper	1961	1975	8	37	23.5	63.51%	20	10	7	6	2	2	8	5	2	6	3	3
Stewart Cink	2002	2010	5	19	8.5	44.74%	5	7	7	1	3	1	3	4	1	1	0	5
Wyndham Clark	2023	2023	1	3	1.5	50.00%	1	1	1	0	1	0	0	0	0	1	0	1
Bill Collins	1961	1961	1	3	1	33.33%	1	2	0	0	1	0	1	1	0	0	0	0
Charles Coody	1971	1971	1	3	0.5	16.67%	0	2	1	0	1	0	0	1	0	0	0	1
John Cook	1993	1993	1	2	1	50.00%	1	1	0	0	1	0	0	0	0	1	0	0
Fred Couples	1989	1997	5	20	9	45.00%	7	9	4	2	1	2	1	5	0	4	3	2
Wiffy Cox	1931	1931	1	2	2	100.00%	2	0	0	1	0	0	1	0	0	0	0	0
Ben Crenshaw	1981	1995	4	12	3.5	29.17%	3	8	1	2	2	0	1	2	0	0	4	1
Ben Curtis	2008	2008	1	3	1.5	50.00%	1	1	1	1	0	0	0	0	0	0	1	1
Bryson DeChambeau	2018	2025	3	11	4	36.36%	3	6	2	1	1	1	1	3	0	1	2	1
Jimmy Demaret	1947	1951	3	6	6	100.00%	6	0	0	3	0	0	3	0	0	0	0	0
Gardner Dickinson	1967	1971	2	10	9	90.00%	9	1	0	2	1	0	4	0	0	3	0	0
Leo Diegel	1927	1933	4	6	3	50.00%	3	3	0	2	1	0	1	2	0	0	0	0
Chris DiMarco	2004	2006	2	8	3	37.50%	2	4	2	1	1	0	1	1	1	0	2	1
Dave Douglas	1953	1953	1	2	1.5	75.00%	1	0	1	0	0	1	1	0	0	0	0	0
Dale Douglass	1969	1969	1	2	0	0.00%	0	2	0	0	1	0	0	0	0	0	1	0
Ed Dudley	1929	1937	3	4	3	75.00%	3	1	0	1	0	0	2	1	0	0	0	0
Jason Dufner	2012	2012	1	4	3	75.00%	3	1	0	1	0	0	2	0	0	0	1	0
Olin Dutra	1933	1935	2	4	1	25.00%	1	3	0	1	1	0	0	2	0	0	0	0
David Duval	1999	2002	2	7	3	42.86%	2	3	2	1	0	1	0	1	0	1	2	1
Lee Elder	1979	1979	1	4	1	25.00%	1	3	0	0	1	0	0	1	0	1	1	0
Harris English	2021	2025	2	6	1.5	25.00%	1	4	1	0	1	1	0	2	0	1	1	0
Al Espinosa	1927	1931	3	4	2.5	62.50%	2	1	1	1	0	1	1	1	0	0	0	0
Johnny Farrell	1927	1931	3	6	3.5	58.33%	3	2	1	1	2	0	2	0	1	0	0	0
Brad Faxon	1995	1997	2	6	2	33.33%	2	4	0	0	2	0	0	0	0	2	2	0
Tony Finau	2018	2021	2	6	3	50.00%	3	3	0	1	1	0	0	0	0	2	2	0
Dow Finsterwald	1957	1963	4	13	9.5	73.08%	9	3	1	3	3	0	4	0	1	2	0	0
Raymond Floyd	1969	1993	8	31	13.5	43.55%	12	16	3	4	4	0	4	8	0	4	4	3
Doug Ford	1955	1961	4	9	4.5	50.00%	4	4	1	2	2	1	2	2	0	0	0	0
Rickie Fowler	2010	2023	5	17	5.5	32.35%	3	9	5	1	3	1	1	4	2	1	2	2
Fred Funk	2004	2004	1	3	0	0.00%	0	3	0	0	1	0	0	2	0	0	0	0
Ed Furgol	1957	1957	1	1	0	0.00%	0	1	0	0	1	0	0	0	0	0	0	0
Marty Furgol	1955	1955	1	1	0	0.00%	0	1	0	0	1	0	0	0	0	0	0	0
Jim Furyk	1997	2014	9	34	12	35.29%	10	20	4	4	4	1	4	8	2	2	8	1
Jim Gallagher Jr.	1993	1993	1	3	2	66.67%	2	1	0	1	0	0	0	0	0	1	1	0
Al Geiberger	1967	1975	2	9	6.5	72.22%	5	1	3	2	0	1	2	1	0	1	0	2
Bob Gilder	1983	1983	1	4	2	50.00%	2	2	0	1	0	0	0	2	0	1	0	0
Bob Goalby	1963	1963	1	5	3.5	70.00%	3	1	1	2	0	0	1	0	0	0	1	1
Johnny Golden	1927	1929	2	3	3	100.00%	3	0	0	1	0	0	2	0	0	0	0	0
Lou Graham	1973	1977	3	9	5.5	61.11%	5	3	1	1	1	0	1	2	1	3	0	0
Hubert Green	1977	1985	3	7	4	57.14%	4	3	0	3	0	0	0	1	0	1	2	0
Ken Green	1989	1989	1	4	2	50.00%	2	2	0	0	1	0	2	0	0	0	1	0
Ben Griffin	2025	2025	1	2	1	50.00%	1	1	0	1	0	0	0	0	0	0	1	0
Ralph Guldahl	1937	1937	1	2	2	100.00%	2	0	0	1	0	0	1	0	0	0	0	0
Fred Haas	1953	1953	1	1	0	0.00%	0	1	0	0	1	0	0	0	0	0	0	0
Jay Haas	1983	2004	3	12	5	41.67%	4	6	2	0	3	0	2	3	0	2	0	2
Walter Hagen	1927	1935	5	9	7.5	83.33%	7	1	1	3	1	0	4	0	1	0	0	0
Bob Hamilton	1949	1949	1	2	0	0.00%	0	2	0	0	1	0	0	1	0	0	0	0
Chick Harbert	1949	1955	2	2	2	100.00%	2	0	0	2	0	0	0	0	0	0	0	0
Brian Harman	2023	2023	1	4	2	50.00%	2	2	0	0	1	0	1	1	0	1	0	0
Chandler Harper	1955	1955	1	1	0	0.00%	0	1	0	0	0	0	0	1	0	0	0	0
Dutch Harrison	1947	1951	3	3	2	66.67%	2	1	0	2	0	0	0	1	0	0	0	0
Fred Hawkins	1957	1957	1	2	1	50.00%	1	1	0	1	0	0	0	1	0	0	0	0
Mark Hayes	1979	1979	1	3	1	33.33%	1	2	0	1	0	0	0	1	0	0	1	0
Clayton Heafner	1949	1951	2	4	3.5	87.50%	3	0	1	1	0	1	2	0	0	0	0	0
Jay Hebert	1959	1961	2	4	2.5	62.50%	2	1	1	0	1	1	2	0	0	0	0	0
Lionel Hebert	1957	1957	1	1	0	0.00%	0	1	0	0	1	0	0	0	0	0	0	0
Russell Henley	2025	2025	1	3	0.5	16.67%	0	2	1	0	0	1	0	2	0	0	0	0
J. J. Henry	2006	2006	1	3	1.5	50.00%	0	0	3	0	0	1	0	0	0	0	0	2
Dave Hill	1969	1977	3	9	6	66.67%	6	3	0	3	0	0	1	2	0	2	1	0
Scott Hoch	1997	2002	2	7	3	42.86%	2	3	2	0	1	1	2	1	0	0	1	1
Ben Hogan	1947	1951	2	3	3	100.00%	3	0	0	1	0	0	2	0	0	0	0	0
J. B. Holmes	2008	2016	2	6	3.5	58.33%	3	2	1	1	1	0	0	0	0	2	1	1
Max Homa	2023	2023	1	5	3.5	70.00%	3	1	1	1	0	0	1	1	0	1	0	1
Hale Irwin	1975	1991	5	20	14	70.00%	13	5	2	3	1	2	6	1	0	4	3	0
Tommy Jacobs	1965	1965	1	4	3	75.00%	3	1	0	1	1	0	0	0	0	2	0	0
Peter Jacobsen	1985	1995	2	6	2	33.33%	2	4	0	0	2	0	2	0	0	0	2	0
Don January	1965	1977	2	7	3	42.86%	2	3	2	0	1	1	0	2	1	2	0	0
Lee Janzen	1993	1997	2	5	2	40.00%	2	3	0	1	1	0	1	1	0	0	1	0
Dustin Johnson	2010	2021	5	21	12	57.14%	12	9	0	4	1	0	3	3	0	5	5	0
Zach Johnson	2006	2016	5	17	9	52.94%	8	7	2	3	1	1	4	5	1	1	1	0
Herman Keiser	1947	1947	1	1	0	0.00%	0	1	0	0	1	0	0	0	0	0	0	0
Anthony Kim	2008	2008	1	4	2.5	62.50%	2	1	1	1	0	0	0	1	1	1	0	0
Tom Kite	1979	1993	7	28	17	60.71%	15	9	4	5	0	2	7	5	1	3	4	1
Brooks Koepka	2016	2023	4	15	8	53.33%	7	6	2	3	0	1	2	3	0	2	3	1
Ted Kroll	1953	1957	3	4	3	75.00%	3	1	0	0	1	0	3	0	0	0	0	0
Matt Kuchar	2010	2016	4	15	7	46.67%	6	7	2	1	3	0	2	2	0	3	2	2
Ky Laffoon	1935	1935	1	1	0	0.00%	0	1	0	0	0	0	0	1	0	0	0	0
Tom Lehman	1995	1999	3	10	6	60.00%	5	3	2	3	0	0	1	2	1	1	1	1
Tony Lema	1963	1965	2	11	9	81.82%	8	1	2	3	0	1	3	0	1	2	1	0
Justin Leonard	1997	2008	3	12	5	41.67%	2	4	6	0	1	2	1	2	2	1	1	2
Wayne Levi	1991	1991	1	2	0	0.00%	0	2	0	0	1	0	0	0	0	0	1	0
Bruce Lietzke	1981	1981	1	3	0.5	16.67%	0	2	1	0	0	1	0	1	0	0	1	0
Gene Littler	1961	1975	7	27	18	66.67%	14	5	8	5	2	3	4	3	1	5	0	4
Davis Love III	1993	2004	6	26	11.5	44.23%	9	12	5	3	1	2	3	5	1	3	6	2
Mark McCumber	1989	1989	1	3	2	66.67%	2	1	0	1	0	0	0	0	0	1	1	0
Jerry McGee	1977	1977	1	2	1	50.00%	1	1	0	0	1	0	1	0	0	0	0	0
Jeff Maggert	1995	1999	3	11	6	54.55%	6	5	0	1	2	0	4	2	0	1	1	0
John Mahaffey	1979	1979	1	3	1	33.33%	1	2	0	1	0	0	0	1	0	0	1	0
Hunter Mahan	2008	2014	3	12	6	50.00%	4	4	4	0	1	2	2	3	1	2	0	1
Tony Manero	1937	1937	1	2	1	50.00%	1	1	0	0	1	0	1	0	0	0	0	0
Lloyd Mangrum	1947	1953	4	8	6	75.00%	6	2	0	3	1	0	3	1	0	0	0	0
Dave Marr	1965	1965	1	6	4	66.67%	4	2	0	2	0	0	1	1	0	1	1	0
Billy Maxwell	1963	1963	1	4	4	100.00%	4	0	0	1	0	0	1	0	0	2	0	0
Dick Mayer	1957	1957	1	2	1.5	75.00%	1	0	1	0	0	1	1	0	0	0	0	0
Bill Mehlhorn	1927	1927	1	2	1	50.00%	1	1	0	1	0	0	0	1	0	0	0	0
Phil Mickelson	1995	2018	12	47	21.5	45.74%	18	22	7	5	6	1	5	8	4	8	8	2
Cary Middlecoff	1953	1959	3	6	2.5	41.67%	2	3	1	1	2	0	1	1	1	0	0	0
Johnny Miller	1975	1981	2	6	3	50.00%	2	2	2	0	2	0	2	0	0	0	0	2
Larry Mize	1987	1987	1	4	2	50.00%	1	1	2	0	0	1	0	1	1	1	0	0
Ryan Moore	2016	2016	1	3	2	66.67%	2	1	0	1	0	0	0	0	0	1	1	0
Gil Morgan	1979	1983	2	6	2.5	41.67%	1	2	3	0	1	1	1	0	1	0	1	1
Collin Morikawa	2021	2025	3	11	5	45.45%	4	5	2	0	1	2	2	3	0	2	1	0
Bob Murphy	1975	1975	1	4	2.5	62.50%	2	1	1	2	0	0	0	1	0	0	0	1
Byron Nelson	1937	1947	2	4	3	75.00%	3	1	0	1	1	0	2	0	0	0	0	0
Larry Nelson	1979	1987	3	13	9.5	73.08%	9	3	1	2	0	1	4	2	0	3	1	0
Bobby Nichols	1967	1967	1	5	4.5	90.00%	4	0	1	1	0	1	2	0	0	1	0	0
Jack Nicklaus	1969	1981	6	28	18.5	66.07%	17	8	3	4	4	2	8	1	0	5	3	1
Andy North	1985	1985	1	3	0	0.00%	0	3	0	0	1	0	0	0	0	0	2	0
Ed Oliver	1947	1953	3	5	3	60.00%	3	2	0	1	1	0	2	1	0	0	0	0
Mark O'Meara	1985	1999	5	14	4.5	32.14%	4	9	1	1	4	0	1	3	0	2	2	1
Jeff Overton	2010	2010	1	4	2	50.00%	2	2	0	1	0	0	0	1	0	1	1	0
Arnold Palmer	1961	1973	6	32	23	71.88%	22	8	2	6	3	2	9	3	0	7	2	0
Johnny Palmer	1949	1949	1	2	0	0.00%	0	2	0	0	1	0	0	1	0	0	0	0
Sam Parks Jr.	1935	1935	1	1	0.5	50.00%	0	0	1	0	0	1	0	0	0	0	0	0
Jerry Pate	1981	1981	1	4	2	50.00%	2	2	0	0	1	0	1	0	0	1	1	0
Steve Pate	1991	1999	2	5	2.5	50.00%	2	2	1	1	0	1	1	0	0	0	2	0
Corey Pavin	1991	1995	3	13	8	61.54%	8	5	0	2	1	0	2	2	0	4	2	0
Calvin Peete	1983	1985	2	7	4.5	64.29%	4	2	1	2	0	0	2	1	0	0	1	1
Kenny Perry	2004	2008	2	6	2.5	41.67%	2	3	1	1	1	0	1	1	1	0	1	0
Henry Picard	1935	1937	2	4	3	75.00%	3	1	0	2	0	0	1	1	0	0	0	0
Dan Pohl	1987	1987	1	3	1	33.33%	1	2	0	0	1	0	1	0	0	0	1	0
Johnny Pott	1963	1967	3	7	5	71.43%	5	2	0	1	1	0	2	1	0	2	0	0
Dave Ragan	1963	1963	1	4	2.5	62.50%	2	1	1	1	0	0	1	0	0	0	1	1
Henry Ransom	1951	1951	1	1	0	0.00%	0	1	0	0	0	0	0	1	0	0	0	0
Patrick Reed	2014	2018	3	12	8	66.67%	7	3	2	3	0	0	1	0	2	3	3	0
Johnny Revolta	1935	1937	2	3	2	66.67%	2	1	0	1	0	0	1	1	0	0	0	0
Chris Riley	2004	2004	1	3	1.5	50.00%	1	1	1	0	1	0	0	0	0	1	0	1
Loren Roberts	1995	1995	1	4	3	75.00%	3	1	0	0	1	0	1	0	0	2	0	0
Chi-Chi Rodríguez	1973	1973	1	2	0.5	25.00%	0	1	1	0	0	0	0	1	1	0	0	0
Bill Rogers	1981	1981	1	4	1.5	37.50%	1	2	1	0	0	1	1	1	0	0	1	0
Bob Rosburg	1959	1959	1	2	2	100.00%	2	0	0	1	0	0	1	0	0	0	0	0
Mason Rudolph	1971	1971	1	3	1.5	50.00%	1	1	1	0	1	0	0	0	1	1	0	0
Paul Runyan	1933	1935	2	4	2	50.00%	2	2	0	1	1	0	1	1	0	0	0	0
Doug Sanders	1967	1967	1	5	2	40.00%	2	3	0	0	2	0	0	1	0	2	0	0
Gene Sarazen	1927	1937	6	12	8.5	70.83%	7	2	3	4	1	1	3	1	2	0	0	0
Xander Schauffele	2021	2025	3	12	7	58.33%	7	5	0	2	1	0	3	3	0	2	1	0
Scottie Scheffler	2021	2025	3	12	4.5	37.50%	3	6	3	2	0	1	0	4	0	1	2	2
Denny Shute	1931	1937	3	6	3	50.00%	2	2	2	1	1	1	1	1	1	0	0	0
Dan Sikes	1969	1969	1	3	2	66.67%	2	1	0	1	0	0	1	0	0	0	1	0
Scott Simpson	1987	1987	1	2	1	50.00%	1	1	0	1	0	0	0	0	0	0	1	0
Webb Simpson	2012	2018	3	9	4.5	50.00%	4	4	1	1	1	1	1	2	0	2	1	0
Horton Smith	1929	1937	5	4	3.5	87.50%	3	0	1	2	0	1	1	0	0	0	0	0
J. C. Snead	1971	1975	3	11	9	81.82%	9	2	0	3	1	0	2	1	0	4	0	0
Sam Snead	1937	1959	7	13	10.5	80.77%	10	2	1	6	1	0	4	1	1	0	0	0
Brandt Snedeker	2012	2016	2	6	4	66.67%	4	2	0	1	1	0	2	1	0	1	0	0
Ed Sneed	1977	1977	1	2	1.5	75.00%	1	0	1	0	0	0	0	0	1	1	0	0
Mike Souchak	1959	1961	2	6	5	83.33%	5	1	0	3	0	0	2	1	0	0	0	0
J. J. Spaun	2025	2025	1	3	2	66.67%	2	1	0	1	0	0	0	0	0	1	1	0
Jordan Spieth	2014	2023	5	22	10.5	47.73%	8	9	5	0	3	2	3	3	2	5	3	1
Craig Stadler	1983	1985	2	8	5	62.50%	4	2	2	2	0	0	1	2	0	1	0	2
Payne Stewart	1987	1999	5	19	9	47.37%	8	9	2	2	3	0	4	5	1	2	1	1
Ken Still	1969	1969	1	3	1	33.33%	1	2	0	0	1	0	0	1	0	1	0	0
Dave Stockton	1971	1977	2	5	3.5	70.00%	3	1	1	1	0	1	1	1	0	1	0	0
Curtis Strange	1983	1995	5	20	7	35.00%	6	12	2	2	3	0	4	4	1	0	5	1
Steve Stricker	2008	2012	3	11	3.5	31.82%	3	7	1	1	2	0	1	2	0	1	3	1
Hal Sutton	1985	2002	4	16	9	56.25%	7	5	4	1	2	1	5	1	1	1	2	2
Vaughn Taylor	2006	2006	1	2	0.5	25.00%	0	1	1	0	1	0	0	0	1	0	0	0
Justin Thomas	2018	2025	4	17	10	58.82%	9	6	2	4	0	0	2	4	0	3	2	2
David Toms	2002	2006	3	12	5	41.67%	4	6	2	1	2	0	2	1	2	1	3	0
Lee Trevino	1969	1981	6	30	20	66.67%	17	7	6	6	2	2	5	3	2	6	2	2
Jim Turnesa	1953	1953	1	1	1	100.00%	1	0	0	1	0	0	0	0	0	0	0	0
Joe Turnesa	1927	1929	2	4	1.5	37.50%	1	2	1	0	2	0	1	0	1	0	0	0
Ken Venturi	1965	1965	1	4	1	25.00%	1	3	0	0	1	0	0	2	0	1	0	0
Scott Verplank	2002	2006	2	5	4	80.00%	4	1	0	2	0	0	1	1	0	1	0	0
Lanny Wadkins	1977	1993	8	34	21.5	63.24%	20	11	3	4	2	2	9	6	0	7	3	1
Jimmy Walker	2014	2016	2	8	3.5	43.75%	2	3	3	1	1	0	1	2	1	0	0	2
Art Wall Jr.	1957	1961	3	6	4	66.67%	4	2	0	2	0	0	2	2	0	0	0	0
Al Watrous	1927	1929	2	3	2	66.67%	2	1	0	1	1	0	1	0	0	0	0	0
Bubba Watson	2010	2018	4	14	4	28.57%	4	10	0	0	4	0	1	3	0	3	3	0
Tom Watson	1977	1989	4	15	10.5	70.00%	10	4	1	2	2	0	4	1	1	4	1	0
Boo Weekley	2008	2008	1	3	2.5	83.33%	2	0	1	1	0	0	0	0	0	1	0	1
Tom Weiskopf	1973	1975	2	10	7.5	75.00%	7	2	1	2	0	1	3	1	0	2	1	0
Brett Wetterich	2006	2006	1	2	0	0.00%	0	2	0	0	1	0	0	0	0	0	1	0
Craig Wood	1931	1935	3	4	1	25.00%	1	3	0	1	2	0	0	1	0	0	0	0
Tiger Woods	1997	2018	8	37	14.5	39.19%	13	21	3	4	2	2	4	9	1	5	10	0
Lew Worsham	1947	1947	1	2	2	100.00%	2	0	0	1	0	0	1	0	0	0	0	0
Cameron Young	2025	2025	1	4	3	75.00%	3	1	0	1	0	0	1	0	0	1	1	0
Fuzzy Zoeller	1979	1985	3	10	1.5	15.00%	1	8	1	0	2	1	0	2	0	1	4	0

In this table the appearances includes players who were in the final team but were not selected for any matches. It does not include those who were initially selected or who qualified but were later replaced. Thus Tom Watson (1979) is excluded.

== Record American Ryder Cup point winners ==
Rank	Name	Record (W–L–H)	Points	Points percentage
1	Billy Casper	20–10–7	23.5	63.51%
2	Arnold Palmer	22–8–2	23	71.88%
3	Phil Mickelson	18–22–7	21.5	45.74%
	Lanny Wadkins	20–11–3	21.5	63.24%
5	Lee Trevino	17–7–6	20	66.67%
6	Jack Nicklaus	17–8–3	18.5	66.07%
7	Gene Littler	14–5–8	18	66.67%
8	Tom Kite	15–9–4	17	60.71%
9	Tiger Woods	13–21–3	14.5	39.19%
10	Hale Irwin	13–5–2	14	70.00%

== Family relationships ==
The following American Ryder Cup players are or have been related:

- Joe Turnesa and Jim Turnesa were brothers.
- Jay Hebert and Lionel Hebert were brothers.
- Sam Snead was the uncle of J. C. Snead.
- Bob Goalby was the uncle of Jay Haas. Haas's mother Shirley was the sister of Goalby.
- Jack Burke Jr. and Dave Marr were second cousins.
- Bruce Lietzke and Jerry Pate were brothers-in-law. Lietzke's wife, Rose, and Pate's wife, Soozi, are sisters. They played together in the 1981 Ryder Cup.

== See also ==
- Golf in the United States
- List of European Ryder Cup golfers
- List of American Presidents Cup golfers
- Lists of golfers
