= John Garner (golfer) =

English professional golfer

Personal information
- Full name: John R. Garner
- Nationality: England
- Born: 9 January 1947 (age 79) Preston, Lancashire
- Height: 5 ft 9 in (1.75 m)

Career
- Sport: Golf
- Turned professional: 1963
- Former tour: European Tour
- Professional wins: 3

Number of wins by tour
- European Tour: 1
- European Senior Tour: 1
- Other: 1

Best results in major championships
- Masters Tournament: DNP
- PGA Championship: DNP
- U.S. Open: DNP
- The Open Championship: T11: 1974

John R. Garner (born 9 January 1947) is an English professional golfer.

== Career ==
During his playing career, Garner won one European Tour event, when he defeated Neil Coles in the final of the Benson & Hedges Match Play Championship in 1972. He didn't win again until 1998 at the Senior Tournament of Champions on the European Seniors Tour.

Garner was a member of the 1971 and 1973 Ryder Cup teams. He made just one appearance in 1971, teaming up with Neil Coles in a four-ball match against Frank Beard and J. C. Snead; the Americans won 2 and 1. Garner did not play a single match in 1973.

Garner is currently the teaching professional at the Manukorihi Golf Club in Taranaki, New Zealand.

== Professional wins (3) ==
=== European Tour wins (1) ===
No.	Date	Tournament	Winning score	Margin of victory	Runner-up
1	16 Sep 1972	Benson & Hedges Match Play Championship	7 and 6		(England) Neil Coles

=== Other wins (1) ===
- 1971 Coca-Cola Young Professionals' Championship

=== European Seniors Tour wins (1) ===
No.	Date	Tournament	Winning score	Margin of victory	Runners-up
1	25 Oct 1998	Senior Tournament of Champions	−5 (69-70=139) (Note: Shortened to 36 holes due to weather.)	1 stroke	(Republic of Ireland) Liam Higgins, (Northern Ireland) Eddie Polland

== Results in major championships ==
Tournament	1967	1968	1969
The Open Championship	CUT	CUT	T34

Tournament	1970	1971	1972	1973	1974	1975	1976	1977	1978	1979
The Open Championship		T35	T28	CUT	T11	CUT		CUT		

Tournament	1980	1981	1982	1983	1984	1985	1986	1987	1988	1989
The Open Championship	CUT				T60					CUT

Note: Garner only played in The Open Championship.

Did not play

CUT = missed the half-way cut (3rd round cut in 1968 and 1973 Open Championships)
"T" indicates a tie for a place

== Team appearances ==
- Ryder Cup: 1971, 1973
- Double Diamond International (representing England): 1971 (winners), 1972 (winners)
