= Old Warson Country Club =

Country club located in St. Louis, Missouri

- Location of the Old Warson Country Club in Missouri Location in the United States
- 38.617°N 90.383°W

Club information
- Location: Ladue, Missouri
- Established: April 15, 1954
- Type: Private
- Tota holes: 18
- Tournaments: 1971 Ryder Cup, 1957 Western Amateur, 1962 Trans-Mississippi Amateur, 1999 U.S. Mid-Amateur Golf, 2009 U.S. Women's Amateur Golf, 2016 U.S. Senior Men's Amateur Golf
- Website: oldwarson.com
- Designed by: Robert Trent Jones
- Par: 71
- Length: 6,946 yards (6,351 m)
- Course rating: 74.6
- Slope rating: 135

Old Warson Country Club is a country club located in St. Louis, Missouri. Founded in 1953, it hosted the 1971 Ryder Cup and the 2009 U.S. Women's Amateur. The golf course was designed by Robert Trent Jones.

Hale Irwin, the winner of three U.S. Opens, joined the club in 1974 as a junior member; since 1977 he has been an active member.

Until 1991, Old Warson Country Club banned Black and Jewish people from joining. That year, it cancelled plans to host a PGA Senior Tour event rather than change its discriminatory rules. Several months later, the club admitted its first Black member: Frederick S. Wood, a retired executive vice president at General Dynamics.

The initiation fee was $45,000 ($92,377 today) in 1996 and $80,000 ($127,765 today) in 2006.

== Major tournaments ==
Year	Tournament	Winner
1957	Western Amateur	Ed Updegraff
1962	Trans-Mississippi Amateur	Bob Ryan
1971	Ryder Cup	Team USA
1999	U.S. Mid-Amateur	Danny Green
2009	U.S. Women's Amateur	Jennifer Song
2016	U.S. Senior Amateur	Dave Ryan
