= 1961 Ryder Cup =

Golf tournament held in England

14th Ryder Cup Matches
- Dates: 13–14 October 1961
- Venue: Royal Lytham & St Annes Golf Club
- Location: Lytham St Annes, England
- Captains: Dai Rees (Great Britain); Jerry Barber (USA)
(United Kingdom)	9 1/2	14 1/2	(United States)
- United States wins the Ryder Cup

Location map
- Location within England

The 14th Ryder Cup Matches were held 13–14 October 1961 at Royal Lytham & St Annes Golf Club in Lytham St Annes, England. The United States team won the competition by a score of 14 1/2 to 9 1/2 points.

At the 1959 Ryder Cup there had been informal discussions between the US and British PGAs about changing the format of the contest. In April 1960 the British PGA made a formal proposal. The suggestion was that, for 1961, matches would be reduced to 18 holes and that there would be two sets of matches each day; two sets of foursomes on the first day and two sets of singles on the second. The pairings for the foursomes and the order of play in the foursomes and singles could be changed for the second set of matches. They also proposed that, for 1963, the match should be extended to three days with two set of four-ball matches on the extra day. By August 1960 the US PGA had agreed to the proposal as it related to the 1961 event, the change being formalised later that year.

== Format ==
The Ryder Cup is a match play event, with each match worth one point. The format used in 1961 was the first change from that used since the inaugural event in 1927. Instead of 12 matches of 36 holes, there were 24 matches of 18 holes. The schedule of play in 1961 was as follows:

- Day 1 (Friday) — 8 foursomes (alternate shot) matches, 4 each in morning and afternoon sessions
- Day 2 (Saturday) — 16 singles matches, 8 each in morning and afternoon sessions

With a total of 24 points, 12 1/2 points were required to win the Cup. All matches were played to a maximum of 18 holes.

== Teams ==
The British team was determined using the 1961 Order of Merit with the 1961 Open Championship and News of the World Match Play winners receiving automatic places. The first qualifying event was the Schweppes PGA Close Championship in early April with the Carling-Caledonian Tournament in early August being the final one. With Arnold Palmer winning the Open, nine players qualified after the Carling-Caledonian Tournament: O'Connor, Hunt, Alliss, Bousfield, Coles, Rees, Panton, Moffitt and Haliburton. Weetman was in tenth place. Weetman gained his place when three of the four semi-finalists in the News of the World Match Play were already in the team and the fourth (Peter Thomson, an Australian) was ineligible. Rees was chosen as the captain.

Team Great Britain
Name	Age	Previous Ryder Cups	Matches	W–L–H	Winning percentage
(Wales) Dai Rees – captain	48	8	14	4–9–1	32.14
(England) Peter Alliss	30	3	6	1–4–1	25.00
(England) Ken Bousfield	42	5	6	3–3–0	50.00
(England) Neil Coles	27	0	Rookie
(Scotland) Tom Haliburton	46	0	Rookie
(England) Bernard Hunt	31	3	5	1–3–1	30.00
(England) Ralph Moffitt	29	0	Rookie
(Republic of Ireland) Christy O'Connor Snr	36	3	5	2–3–0	40.00
(Scotland) John Panton	45	2	3	0–3–0	0.00
(England) Harry Weetman	40	5	8	1–6–1	18.75

Arnold Palmer, age 32, competed in his first Ryder Cup. He recorded two wins in pairs and a win and a half in singles.

Team USA
Name	Age	Previous Ryder Cups	Matches	W–L–H	Winning percentage
Jerry Barber – captain	45	1	2	0–2–0	0.00
Billy Casper	30	0	Rookie
Bill Collins	33	0	Rookie
Dow Finsterwald	32	2	4	3–1–0	75.00
Doug Ford	39	3	6	3–2–1	58.33
Jay Hebert	38	1	1	0–0–1	50.00
Gene Littler	31	0	Rookie
Arnold Palmer	32	0	Rookie
Mike Souchak	34	1	2	2–0–0	100.00
Art Wall Jr.	37	2	3	1–2–0	33.33

== Friday's matches ==
=== Morning foursomes ===
	Results
O'Connor/Alliss	(United Kingdom) 4 & 3	Ford/Littler
Panton/Hunt	(United States) 4 & 3	Wall/Hebert
Rees/Bousfield	(United States) 2 & 1	Casper/Palmer
Haliburton/Coles	(United States) 1 up	Collins/Souchak
1	Session	3
1	Overall	3

=== Afternoon foursomes ===
	Results
O'Connor/Alliss	(United States) 1 up	Wall/Hebert
Panton/Hunt	(United States) 5 & 4	Casper/Palmer
Rees/Bousfield	(United Kingdom) 4 & 2	Collins/Souchak
Haliburton/Coles	(United States) 1 up	Barber/Finsterwald
1	Session	3
2	Overall	6

== Saturday's matches ==
=== Morning singles ===
	Results
Harry Weetman	(United States) 1 up	Doug Ford
Ralph Moffitt	(United States) 5 & 4	Mike Souchak
Peter Alliss	halved	Arnold Palmer
Ken Bousfield	(United States) 5 & 3	Billy Casper
Dai Rees	(United Kingdom) 2 & 1	Jay Hebert
Neil Coles	halved	Gene Littler
Bernard Hunt	(United Kingdom) 5 & 4	Jerry Barber
Christy O'Connor	(United States) 2 & 1	Dow Finsterwald
3	Session	5
5	Overall	11

=== Afternoon singles ===
	Results
Harry Weetman	(United States) 1 up	Art Wall Jr.
Peter Alliss	(United Kingdom) 3 & 2	Bill Collins
Bernard Hunt	(United States) 2 & 1	Mike Souchak
Tom Haliburton	(United States) 2 & 1	Arnold Palmer
Dai Rees	(United Kingdom) 4 & 3	Doug Ford
Ken Bousfield	(United Kingdom) 1 up	Jerry Barber
Neil Coles	(United Kingdom) 1 up	Dow Finsterwald
Christy O'Connor	halved	Gene Littler
4 1/2	Session	3 1/2
9 1/2	Overall	14 1/2

== Individual player records ==
Each entry refers to the win–loss–half record of the player.

=== Great Britain ===
Player	Points	Overall	Singles	Foursomes
Peter Alliss	2.5	2–1–1	1–0–1	1–1–0
Ken Bousfield	2	2–2–0	1–1–0	1–1–0
Neil Coles	1.5	1–2–1	1–0–1	0–2–0
Tom Haliburton	0	0–3–0	0–1–0	0–2–0
Bernard Hunt	1	1–3–0	1–1–0	0–2–0
Ralph Moffitt	0	0–1–0	0–1–0	0–0–0
Christy O'Connor	1.5	1–2–1	0–1–1	1–1–0
John Panton	0	0–2–0	0–0–0	0–2–0
Dai Rees	3	3–1–0	2–0–0	1–1–0
Harry Weetman	0	0–2–0	0–2–0	0–0–0

=== United States ===
Player	Points	Overall	Singles	Foursomes
Jerry Barber	1	1–2–0	0–2–0	1–0–0
Billy Casper	3	3–0–0	1–0–0	2–0–0
Bill Collins	1	1–2–0	0–1–0	1–1–0
Dow Finsterwald	2	2–1–0	1–1–0	1–0–0
Doug Ford	1	1–2–0	1–1–0	0–1–0
Jay Hebert	2	2–1–0	0–1–0	2–0–0
Gene Littler	1	0–1–2	0–0–2	0–1–0
Arnold Palmer	3.5	3–0–1	1–0–1	2–0–0
Mike Souchak	3	3–1–0	2–0–0	1–1–0
Art Wall Jr.	3	3–0–0	1–0–0	2–0–0
