= Carling Tournament =

Golf tournament in the United Kingdom

Tournament information
- Location: United Kingdom
- Established: 1960
- Format: 72-holes stroke play
- Month played: August/September
- Final year: 1962

Final champion
- Kel Nagle

The Carling Tournament was a professional golf tournament played in the United Kingdom from 1960 to 1962.

== History ==
The first event, in 1960, was called the Hammonds-Carling Jubilee Tournament and was held at Pannal Golf Club, Harrogate, Yorkshire. It was won by Dai Rees, who won the first prize of £550.

The 1961 event was called the Carling-Caledonian Tournament and was held at Longniddry Golf Club, East Lothian, Scotland. It was won by Christy O'Connor Snr, who took home the first prize of £1,000. The event was the last before the selection of the British 1961 Ryder Cup team.

In 1962 the event was called the Carling-Lancastrian Tournament and was held at Fairhaven Golf Club, Lytham St Annes, Lancashire. It was won by Kel Nagle, who won the first prize of £1,000.

An event was planned for 1963 but was cancelled when Carling announced the start of the Carling World Open from 1964.

== Winners ==
Year	Winner	Country	Venue	Score	Margin of victory	Runner(s)-up	Winner's share (£)	Ref
Hammonds-Carling Jubilee Tournament
1960	Dai Rees	Wales	Pannal	273	2 strokes	(England) Max Faulkner (Scotland) John Panton	550	
Carling-Caledonian Tournament
1961	Christy O'Connor Snr	Ireland	Longniddry	269	2 strokes	(Scotland) John Panton (England) Harry Weetman	1,000	
Carling-Lancastrian Tournament
1962	Kel Nagle	Australia	Fairhaven	269	5 strokes	(England) Bernard Hunt	1,000	
