= 1973 Ryder Cup =

Golf tournament in Scotland

20th Ryder Cup Matches
- Dates: 20–22 September 1973
- Venue: Muirfield
- Location: East Lothian, Scotland
- Captains: Bernard Hunt (GB&I); Jack Burke Jr. (USA)
(United Kingdom) (Republic of Ireland)	13	19	(United States)
- United States wins the Ryder Cup

Location map
- Location within Scotland

The 20th Ryder Cup Matches were held at Muirfield in Gullane, East Lothian, Scotland. The United States team won the competition by a score of 19 to 13 points. For the first time, what had previously been the "Great Britain" team was called "Great Britain and Ireland", although golfers from the Republic of Ireland had played since 1953, and from Northern Ireland since 1947.

Muirfield had hosted the Open Championship the previous year, won by American Lee Trevino.

== Format ==
The Ryder Cup is a match play event, with each match worth one point. The competition format was adjusted slightly in 1973 from the format used from 1963 through 1971:

- Day 1 — 4 foursomes (alternate shot) matches in a morning session and 4 four-ball (better ball) matches in an afternoon session
- Day 2 — 4 foursome matches in a morning session and 4 four-ball matches in an afternoon session
- Day 3 — 16 singles matches, 8 each in morning and afternoon sessions

With a total of 32 points, 16 1/2 points were required to win the Cup. All matches were played to a maximum of 18 holes.

== Teams ==
Selection for the Great Britain and Ireland team was based on a points list with points being earned between the 1972 Benson & Hedges Festival of Golf and the same event in 1973. Total points determined the order, with 30 points to the winner, 24 for the runner-up, down to 1 point for the player in 25th place. The leading 8 in the points list were guaranteed places, with the remaining 4 selected by a committee. The top 8 were: Oosterhuis, Coles, Jacklin, Bembridge, Barnes, Butler, O'Connor and Gallacher. The selection committee chose the players lying 9th to 12th in the list: Garner, Polland, Clark and Huggett.

Team Great Britain and Ireland
Name	Age	Previous Ryder Cups	Matches	W–L–H	Winning percentage
(England) Bernard Hunt	43	Non-playing captain
(Scotland) Brian Barnes	28	2	6	2–4–0	33.33
(England) Maurice Bembridge	28	2	7	3–3–1	50.00
(England) Peter Butler	41	3	11	3–6–2	36.36
(England) Clive Clark	28	0	Rookie
(England) Neil Coles	38	6	32	11–15–6	43.75
(Scotland) Bernard Gallacher	24	2	9	5–3–1	61.11
(England) John Garner	26	1	1	0–1–0	0.00
(Wales) Brian Huggett	36	4	19	5–9–5	39.47
(England) Tony Jacklin	29	3	17	7–6–4	52.94
(Republic of Ireland) Christy O'Connor Snr	48	9	31	10–18–3	37.10
(England) Peter Oosterhuis	25	1	6	3–3–0	50.00
(Northern Ireland) Eddie Polland	26	0	Rookie

Due to the rules of the PGA of America in place at the time, players with less than five years as a professional were not eligible for the U.S. team, which included reigning U.S. Open champion Johnny Miller and Lanny Wadkins. (These rules also kept Jack Nicklaus on the sidelines until 1969.) Miller made his Ryder Cup debut in 1975 and Wadkins in 1977.

Team USA
Name	Age	Previous Ryder Cups	Matches	W–L–H	Winning percentage
Jack Burke Jr.	50	Non-playing captain
Tommy Aaron	36	1	4	1–2–1	37.50
Homero Blancas	35	0	Rookie
Gay Brewer	41	1	5	3–2–0	60.00
Billy Casper	42	6	27	14–7–6	62.96
Lou Graham	35	0	Rookie
Dave Hill	36	1	6	4–2–0	66.67
Jack Nicklaus	33	2	10	6–3–1	65.00
Arnold Palmer	44	5	27	20–5–2	77.78
Chi-Chi Rodríguez	37	0	Rookie
J. C. Snead	32	1	4	4–0–0	100.00
Lee Trevino	33	2	11	6–3–2	63.64
Tom Weiskopf	30	0	Rookie

== Thursday's matches ==
=== Morning foursomes ===
	Results
Barnes/Gallacher	(United Kingdom) (Republic of Ireland) 1 up	Trevino/Casper
O'Connor/Coles	(United Kingdom) (Republic of Ireland) 3 & 2	Weiskopf/Snead
Jacklin/Oosterhuis	halved	Rodríguez/Graham
Bembridge/Polland	(United States) 6 & 5	Nicklaus/Palmer
2 1/2	Session	1 1/2
2 1/2	Overall	1 1/2

=== Afternoon four-ball ===
	Results
Barnes/Gallacher	(United Kingdom) (Republic of Ireland) 5 & 4	Aaron/Brewer
Bembridge/Huggett	(United Kingdom) (Republic of Ireland) 3 & 1	Nicklaus/Palmer
Jacklin/Oosterhuis	(United Kingdom) (Republic of Ireland) 3 & 1	Weiskopf/Casper
Coles/O'Connor	(United States) 2 & 1	Trevino/Blancas
3	Session	1
5 1/2	Overall	2 1/2

== Friday's matches ==
=== Morning foursomes ===
	Results
Barnes/Butler	(United States) 1 up	Nicklaus/Weiskopf
Oosterhuis/Jacklin	(United Kingdom) (Republic of Ireland) 2 up	Palmer/Hill
Bembridge/Huggett	(United Kingdom) (Republic of Ireland) 5 & 4	Rodríguez/Graham
Coles/O'Connor	(United States) 2 & 1	Trevino/Casper
2	Session	2
7 1/2	Overall	4 1/2

=== Afternoon four-ball ===
	Results
Barnes/Butler	(United States) 2 up	Snead/Palmer
Jacklin/Oosterhuis	(United States) 3 & 2	Brewer/Casper
Clark/Polland	(United States) 3 & 2	Nicklaus/Weiskopf
Bembridge/Huggett	halved	Trevino/Blancas
1/2	Session	3 1/2
8	Overall	8

== Saturday's matches ==
=== Morning singles ===
	Results
Brian Barnes	(United States) 2 & 1	Billy Casper
Bernard Gallacher	(United States) 3 & 1	Tom Weiskopf
Peter Butler	(United States) 5 & 4	Homero Blancas
Tony Jacklin	(United Kingdom) (Republic of Ireland) 3 & 1	Tommy Aaron
Neil Coles	halved	Gay Brewer
Christy O'Connor	(United States) 1 up	J. C. Snead
Maurice Bembridge	halved	Jack Nicklaus
Peter Oosterhuis	halved	Lee Trevino
2 1/2	Session	5 1/2
10 1/2	Overall	13 1/2

=== Afternoon singles ===
	Results
Brian Huggett	(United Kingdom) (Republic of Ireland) 4 & 2	Homero Blancas
Brian Barnes	(United States) 3 & 1	J. C. Snead
Bernard Gallacher	(United States) 6 & 5	Gay Brewer
Tony Jacklin	(United States) 2 & 1	Billy Casper
Neil Coles	(United States) 6 & 5	Lee Trevino
Christy O'Connor	halved	Tom Weiskopf
Maurice Bembridge	(United States) 2 up	Jack Nicklaus
Peter Oosterhuis	(United Kingdom) (Republic of Ireland) 4 & 2	Arnold Palmer
2 1/2	Session	5 1/2
13	Overall	19

== Individual player records ==
Each entry refers to the win–loss–half record of the player.

=== Great Britain and Ireland ===
Player	Points	Overall	Singles	Foursomes	Fourballs
Brian Barnes	2	2–4–0	0–2–0	1–1–0	1–1–0
Maurice Bembridge	3	2–2–2	0–1–1	1–1–0	1–0–1
Peter Butler	0	0–3–0	0–1–0	0–1–0	0–1–0
Clive Clark	0	0–1–0	0–0–0	0–0–0	0–1–0
Neil Coles	1.5	1–3–1	0–1–1	1–1–0	0–1–0
Bernard Gallacher	2	2–2–0	0–2–0	1–0–0	1–0–0
Brian Huggett	3.5	3–0–1	1–0–0	1–0–0	1–0–1
Tony Jacklin	3.5	3–2–1	1–1–0	1–0–1	1–1–0
Christy O'Connor	1.5	1–3–1	0–1–1	1–1–0	0–1–0
Peter Oosterhuis	4	3–1–2	1–0–1	1–0–1	1–1–0
Eddie Polland	0	0–2–0	0–0–0	0–1–0	0–1–0

John Garner did not play in any matches.

=== United States ===
Player	Points	Overall	Singles	Foursomes	Fourballs
Tommy Aaron	0	0–2–0	0–1–0	0–0–0	0–1–0
Homero Blancas	2.5	2–1–1	1–1–0	0–0–0	1–0–1
Gay Brewer	2.5	2–1–1	1–0–1	0–0–0	1–1–0
Billy Casper	4	4–2–0	2–0–0	1–1–0	1–1–0
Lou Graham	0.5	0–1–1	0–0–0	0–1–1	0–0–0
Dave Hill	0	0–1–0	0–0–0	0–1–0	0–0–0
Jack Nicklaus	4.5	4–1–1	1–0–1	2–0–0	1–1–0
Arnold Palmer	2	2–3–0	0–1–0	1–1–0	1–1–0
Chi-Chi Rodríguez	0.5	0–1–1	0–0–0	0–1–1	0–0–0
J. C. Snead	3	3–1–0	2–0–0	0–1–0	1–0–0
Lee Trevino	4	3–1–2	1–0–1	1–1–0	1–0–1
Tom Weiskopf	3.5	3–2–1	1–0–1	1–1–0	1–1–0
