= Ryder Cup =

Team-based men's golf competition between European and American professionals

Tournament information
- Location: 2025: Farmingdale, New York
- Established: 1927; 99 years ago
- Course: 2025: Bethpage Black Course
- Par: 2025: 70
- Length: 2025: 7,426 yd (6,790 m)
- Organized by: PGA of America, Ryder Cup Europe
- Tours: PGA Tour, European Tour
- Format: Match play
- Prize fund: None
- Month played: September, October
- Website: rydercup.com

Current champion
- Europe

Current tournament
- 2025 Ryder Cup

The Ryder Cup is a biennial men's golf competition between teams from Europe and the United States, with hosting duties alternating between venues in Europe and the United States for each edition. The cup is named after the English businessman Samuel Ryder who donated the trophy, and it is jointly administered by the PGA of America and Ryder Cup Europe, the latter a joint venture of the PGA European Tour (60%), the PGA of Great Britain and Ireland (20%), and the PGAs of Europe (20%).

Initially contested between Great Britain and the United States, the first official Ryder Cup took place in the United States in 1927 at Worcester Country Club in Worcester, Massachusetts. The home team won the first five contests. After World War II, repeated American dominance led to an extension of the team from Great Britain and Ireland to include the rest of Europe, beginning in 1979.

Since 2000, Europe has won nine of the twelve Ryder Cups held.

In the Ryder Cup, competing professionals receive no prize money. The Ryder Cup was held in odd-numbered years until 1999, but it then moved to even years in 2002 after being postponed in 2001 due to the 9/11 terrorist attacks. It moved back to odd years again in 2021, after the 2020 event was postponed due to the COVID-19 pandemic.

== Founding of the Cup ==
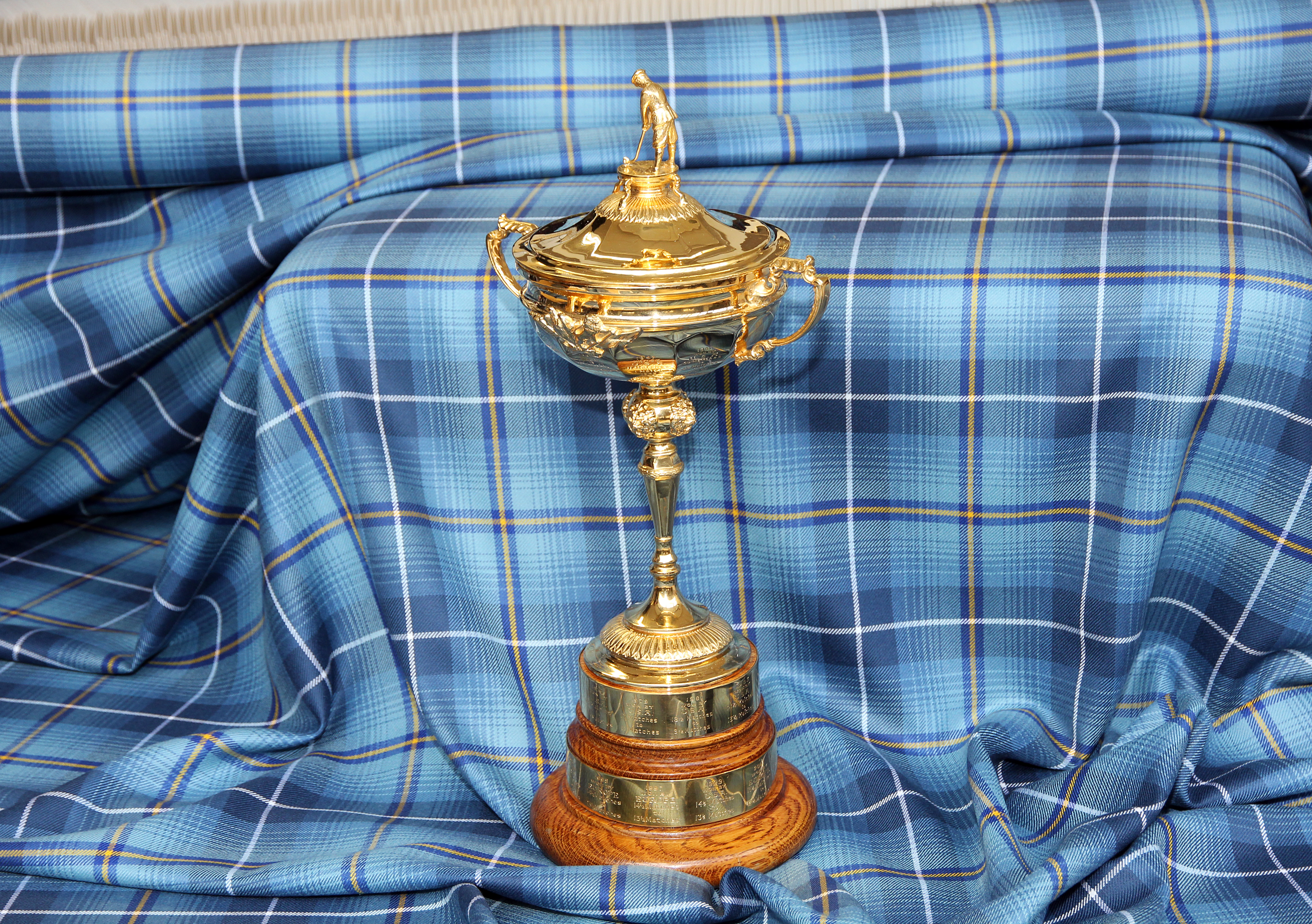
The Ryder Cup. The figure on top is modeled after professional golfer Abe Mitchell, the private coach of the event's original sponsor, English businessman Samuel Ryder.

=== Gleneagles 1921 ===
On 27 September 1920, Golf Illustrated wrote a letter to the Professional Golfers' Association (PGA) of America suggesting that a team of 12 to 20 American professionals be chosen to play in the 1921 Open Championship, to be financed by popular subscription. The idea was that of James D. Harnett, who worked for the magazine. At that time, no American golfer had won the Open Championship. The PGA of America replied positively and announced the idea in the November 1920 issue. The fund was called the British Open Championship Fund. By the following spring, the idea had been firmed up. A team of 12 would be chosen, who would sail in time to play in a warm-up tournament at Gleneagles, the Glasgow Herald 1000 Guinea Tournament, before the Open at St Andrews two weeks later. The team was chosen by the PGA of America's president and secretary, George Sargent and Alec Pirie, with the assistance of United States Golf Association Vice-president Robert Gardner. A team of 11 sailed with James Harnett from New York on the RMS Aquitania on 24 May 1921.

The idea for a 12-man international match between the American and Great Britain professionals was reported in The Times on 17 May, with James Douglas Edgar being reported as the probable 12th player. The match would be played at Gleneagles on Monday 6 June, the day before the start of the 1000 Guinea Tournament. With Great Britain's Jim Barnes indisposed, the match became a 10-man contest. The match consisted of five foursomes in the morning and 10 singles in the afternoon, played on the King's Course. The match was won by Great Britain by nine matches to three, with three matches halved.

The British team was: George Duncan (captain), James Braid, Arthur Havers, Abe Mitchell, James Ockenden, Ted Ray, James Sherlock, J. H. Taylor, Josh Taylor, and Harry Vardon. The American team was: Emmet French (captain), Clarence Hackney, Walter Hagen, Charles Hoffner, Jock Hutchison, Tom Kerrigan, George McLean, Fred McLeod, Bill Mehlhorn and Wilfrid Reid. Gold medals were presented by Katharine Stewart-Murray, Duchess of Atholl, to each member of the teams at the conclusion of the Glasgow Herald tournament on Saturday.

=== Wentworth 1926 ===
In 1926, American professional golfers traveled to Britain to compete in the that year's Open. In February, it was announced that Hagen would select a team of four American professionals including himself to play four British professionals in a match before the Open Championship. The match would be a stroke-play competition over 18 holes. In April, Samuel Ryder would be presenting a trophy "for annual competition between British and American professionals." with the first match to be played on 4 and 5 June "but the details are not yet decided", and then in May it was announced that the match would be a match-play competition, 8-a-side, foursomes on the first day, singles on the second. Eventually, at Hagen's request, 10 players competed for each team. Samuel Ryder (together with his brother James) had sponsored a number of British professional events starting in 1923.

The match resulted in 13–1 victory for the British team (one match was halved). The American point was won by Bill Mehlhorn with Emmet French being all square. Medals were presented to the players by the American ambassador Alanson B. Houghton.

The match was widely reported as being for the "Ryder Cup". However Golf Illustrated for 11 June states that because of uncertainty following the general strike in May, which led to uncertainty about how many Americans would be visiting Britain, Samuel Ryder had decided to withhold the cup for a year. It has also been suggested that because Walter Hagen chose the American team rather than the American PGA, that only those Americans who had travelled to Britain to play in the Open were available for selection and that it contained a number of players born outside the United States, also contributed to the feeling that the match ought to be regarded as unofficial. In addition the Americans "had only just landed in England and were not yet in full practice."

The British team was: Ted Ray (Captain), Aubrey Boomer, Archie Compston, George Duncan, George Gadd, Arthur Havers, Herbert Jolly, Abe Mitchell, Fred Robson and Ernest Whitcombe. The American team was: Walter Hagen (Captain), Tommy Armour, Jim Barnes, Emmet French, Joe Kirkwood, Fred McLeod, Bill Mehlhorn, Joe Stein, Cyril Walker and Al Watrous. While all ten of the British players subsequently played in the Ryder Cup only three of the Americans did (Hagen, Mehlhorn and Watrous). Armour, Barnes, Kirkwood, McLeod and Walker were excluded by the policy of requiring players to be born in the USA while French and Stein were never selected.

=== Worcester 1927 ===
The 1927 competition was organized on a much more formal basis. A Ryder Cup "Deed of Trust" was drawn up formalising the rules of the contest, while each of the PGA organisations had a selection process. In Britain, Golf Illustrated launched a fund to raise £3,000 to fund professional golfers to play in the U.S. Open and the Ryder Cup. Ryder contributed £100 and, when the fund closed with a shortfall of £300, he made up the outstanding balance himself. Although not in the rules at that time, the American PGA restricted their team to those born in the United States.

In early 1928 it became clear that an annual contest was not practical and so it was decided that the second contest should be in 1929 and then every two years thereafter.

== Eligibility ==
The Deed of Trust allows each the respective PGAs to decide their teams and any questions of eligibility.

For the 1929 contest at Moortown Golf Club, Leeds, UK, the American PGA again restricted their team to those born in the USA, but in late 1929 the Deed of Trust was revised requiring all players to be born and resident in their respective countries, as well as being members of their respective Professional Golfers' Association.

Although the initial Deed of Trust referred to the British PGA team as "representing Great Britain", members from outside Great Britain subsequently played: Aubrey Boomer from Jersey in 1929, Herbert Jolly from Guernsey in 1931, and players from Northern Ireland beginning with Fred Daly in 1949. In the early 1950s, the British PGA created a united division for players from the island of Ireland, and players from the Republic of Ireland became eligible, beginning in 1953 with Harry Bradshaw. The Deed of Trust changed the team name to "Great Britain and Ireland" in 1973 in recognition of the latter change.

Beginning in 1979, players from all of Europe have been eligible to play, representing "Team Europe". The change to include all Europeans arose from discussion in 1977 between Jack Nicklaus and Edward Stanley, 18th Earl of Derby, who was serving as the president of the Professional Golfers' Association, as a means to make the matches more competitive, since the Americans almost always won, and often by lopsided margins. From the resumption of competition in 1947 to 1977, Great Britain and Ireland had only managed one win and one tie. The change worked, as the contests soon became much more competitive, with talented young Europeans such as Seve Ballesteros and Bernhard Langer bolstering the European side. The present-day popularity of the Ryder Cup, which now generates enormous media attention, can be said to date from that change in eligibility.

Prior to the 2002 Ryder Cup, the PGA of America changed its eligibility rules, extending eligibility for Team USA to all individuals born with U.S. citizenship, plus those who acquired U.S. citizenship before age 18.

As of June 2024, the International Golf Federation's nationality policy recognises fifty countries whose golfers are eligible to compete for Europe at the Ryder Cup. This includes all members of the European Golf Association except Kosovo, plus non-members Moldova, Monaco, Montenegro, and North Macedonia.

== Format ==
The Ryder Cup involves various match play competitions between players selected from two teams of 12. It takes place from a Friday to a Sunday with 28 matches being played over 18 holes. On Friday and Saturday, there are four fourball matches and four foursomes matches each day, four matches in the morning and four matches in the afternoon. On Sunday, there are 12 singles matches when all team members play. Not all players must play on Friday and Saturday. The captain can select any eight players for each of the sessions.

The winner of each match scores a point for his team, with half a point each for any match that is tied after the 18 holes. The winning team is determined by cumulative total points. In the event of a tie, the Ryder Cup is retained by the defending champion.

A foursomes match is a competition between two teams of two golfers. On each hole, the golfers on the same team alternate shots playing the same ball. One team member tees off on odd-numbered holes and the other on even-numbered holes. Each hole is won by the team that completes the hole in the fewest shots.

A fourball match is a competition between two teams of two golfers. Each golfer plays his own ball throughout the round. Each team's score is determined by the better score of the two golfers on the team.

A singles match is a standard match play competition between two golfers.

The format of the Ryder Cup has changed over the years. From the inaugural event until 1959, the Ryder Cup was a two-day competition with 36-hole matches. In 1961, the matches were changed to 18 holes each and the number of matches doubled. The event was expanded to three days in 1963, with fourball matches being played for the first time. This format remained until 1977, when the number of matches was reduced to 20. In 1979, the first year continental European players participated, the format was changed to the 28-match version in use today, with eight foursomes/four-ball matches on the first two days and 12 singles matches on the last day.

Year	Day 1		Day 2		Day 3		Total points
Year	Morning	Afternoon	Morning	Afternoon	Morning	Afternoon	Total points
1927–59	four 36-hole foursomes		eight 36-hole singles		–		12
1961	four foursomes	four foursomes	eight singles	eight singles	–		24
1963–71	four foursomes	four foursomes	four fourballs	four fourballs	eight singles	eight singles	32
1973	four foursomes	four fourballs	four foursomes	four fourballs	eight singles	eight singles	32
1975	four foursomes	four fourballs	four fourballs	four foursomes	eight singles	eight singles	32
1977	five foursomes		five fourballs		10 singles		20
1979– present	four foursomes	four fourballs	four foursomes	four fourballs	12 singles		28
1979– present	or		or		12 singles		28
1979– present	four fourballs	four foursomes	four fourballs	four foursomes	12 singles		28

The team size was increased from 10 to 12 in 1969.

There were two singles sessions, morning and afternoon, in 1979, but no player played in both sessions.

Since 1979, there have been four foursomes and four fourballs on each of the first two days. The home captain decides before the contest begins which matches will be played in the morning and which will be played in the afternoon. He may choose a different order for the two days. A player can play a maximum of five matches (two foursomes, two fourballs and a singles match). Between 1963 and 1975, it was possible to play two foursomes, two fourballs and two singles matches.

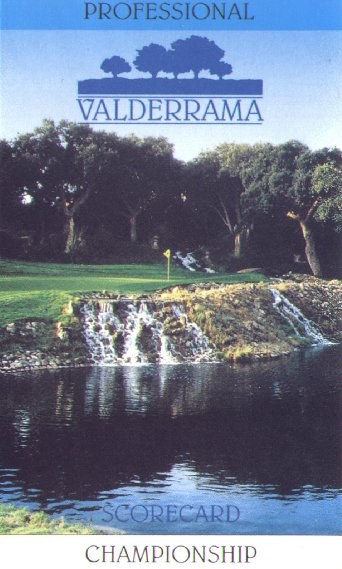
1993 scorecard of Valderrama, continental Europe's most renowned course. The Spanish club was the first outside the United Kingdom and United States to host the competition, in 1997

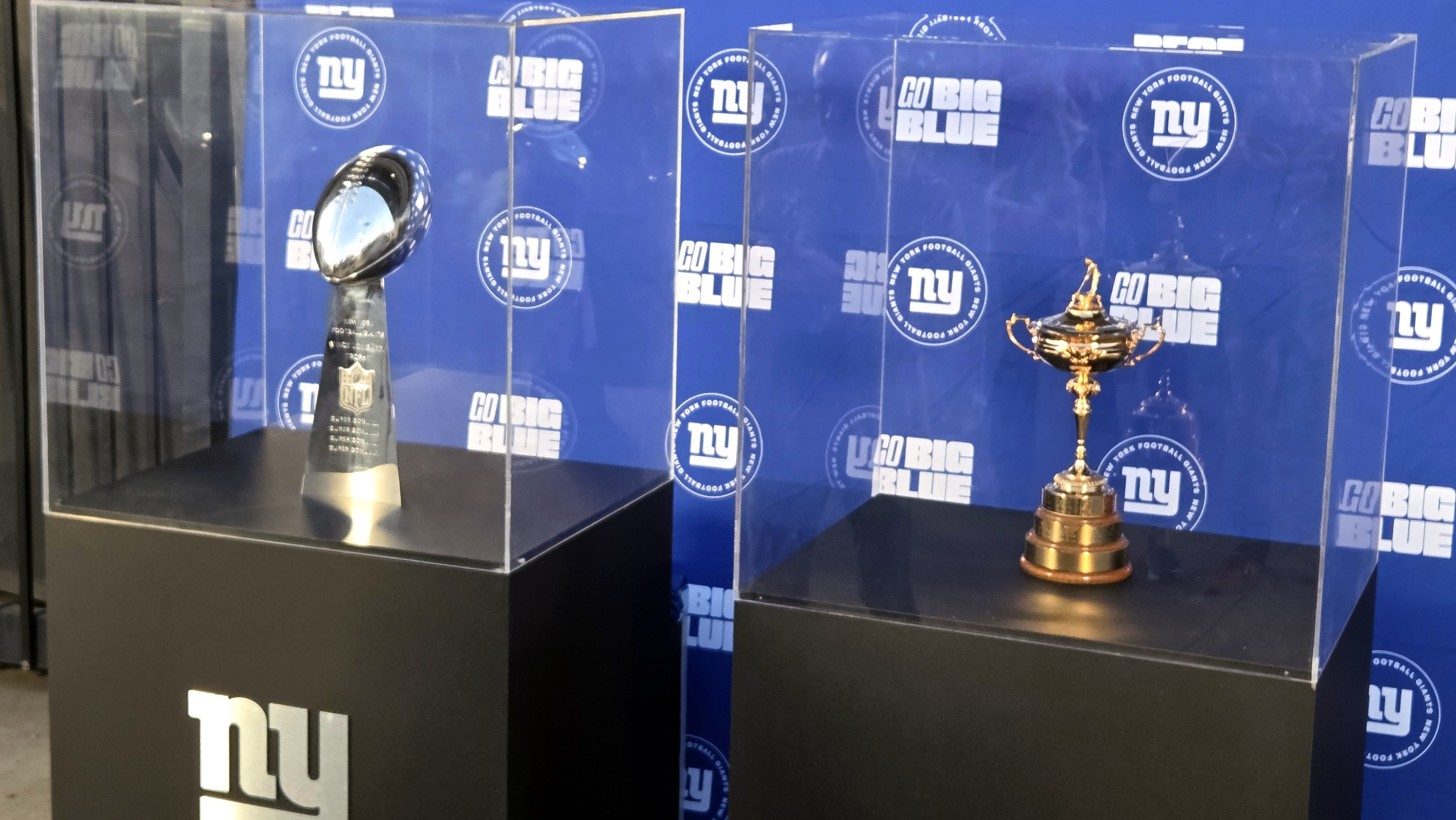
The Ryder Cup and The Vince Lombardi Trophy (awarded to the annual Super Bowl Champion of the NFL) on display before a New York Giants football game at MetLife Stadium a week before the 2025 Ryder Cup was held at Bethpage Black golf course in Long Island, New York on September 28, 2025.

== Team composition ==
=== Captains ===
The captains have always selected the players and chosen the playing order in each group of matches. When the contest involved 36-hole matches, it was usual for the captain to be one of the players. The USA only had two non-playing captains in this period: Walter Hagen in 1937 and Ben Hogan in 1949 while Great Britain had non-playing captains in 1933, 1949, 1951 and 1953. With the change to 18-hole matches and the extension to three days, it became more difficult to combine the roles of captain and player and Arnold Palmer in 1963 was the last playing captain. The captains have always been professional golfers and the only captain who never played in the Ryder Cup was J. H. Taylor, the 1933 British captain.

=== Qualification and selection ===
The selection process for the Ryder Cup players has varied over the years. In the early contests the teams were generally decided by a selection committee but later qualification based on performances was introduced. The current system by which most of the team is determined by performances with a small number of players selected by the captain (known as "wild cards" or "captain's picks") gradually evolved and has been used by both sides since 1989.

For the 2014 Ryder Cup both teams had 9 players qualifying based on performances with the remaining 3 players selected by the captain. For those players gaining automatic qualification the Europeans used a system, introduced in 2004, using two tables; one using prize money won in official European Tour events and a second based on World Ranking points gained anywhere in the world. Both tables used a 12-month qualifying period finishing at the end of August. The American system, introduced in 2008, was based on prize money earned in official PGA Tour events during the current season and prize money earned in the major championships in the previous season. The qualifying period ended after the PGA Championship.

For the 2016 Ryder Cup there were a number of changes from 2014 in the American system. The number of captain's picks was increased from three to four with the selections being made later than previously, especially moving the fourth and last pick to less than a week before the Ryder Cup, right after the completion of the Tour Championship. The qualifying events now included both the 2015 World Golf Championships events and The Players Championship, on top of the four major championships, but only included 2016 PGA Tour events actually played in 2016, thus excluded any other event played in 2015. The qualifying period was also extended because the Olympic Games had moved the timeslot for the 2016 PGA Championship which took place already at the end of July. Team Europe retained its old system of qualification and wild cards.

== Notable Ryder Cups ==
=== 1969: Nicklaus vs Jacklin ===
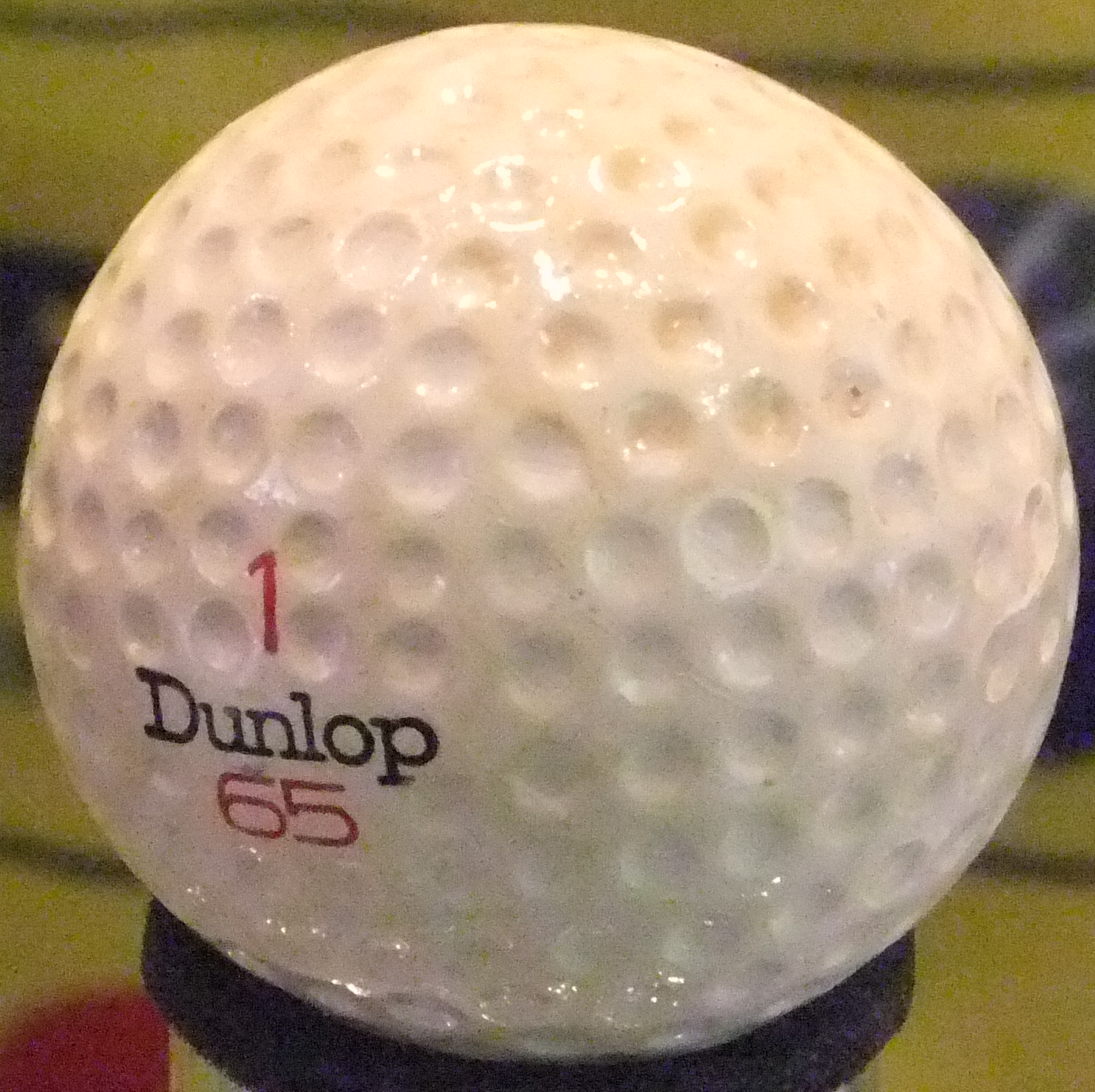
Tony Jacklin's golf ball used in the 1969 Ryder Cup held at Royal Birkdale Golf Club

The 1969 Cup held at Royal Birkdale was perhaps one of the best and most competitive contests in terms of play (18 of the 32 matches went to the last green). It was decided in its very last match, of which United States Captain Sam Snead later said "This is the greatest golf match you have ever seen in England".

With the United States and Great Britain tied at 15 1/2 each, Jack Nicklaus led Tony Jacklin by the score of 1 up as they played the 17th hole. Jacklin made a 35-foot eagle putt and when Nicklaus missed his own eagle try from 12 feet, the match was all square.

At the par-5 finishing hole, both Jacklin and Nicklaus got on the green in two. Nicklaus ran his eagle putt five feet past the hole, while Jacklin left his two feet short. Nicklaus then sank his birdie putt, and with a crowd of 8,000 people watching, picked up Jacklin's marker, conceding the putt Jacklin needed to tie the matches. As the current holders, the rules meant that the United States retained the trophy. "I don't think you would have missed that putt", Nicklaus said to Jacklin afterwards, "but in these circumstances I would never give you the opportunity."

This gesture of sportsmanship by Nicklaus caused controversy on the American side, some of whom would have preferred to force Jacklin to attempt the putt for the small chance that he might miss, which would have given the United States team an outright win. "All the boys thought it was ridiculous to give him that putt", said Sam Snead. "We went over there to win, not to be good ol' boys."

=== 1989: Azinger and Ballesteros ===
Held at The Belfry in England, the 1989 Ryder Cup saw the rising of tensions in the series. After holding the cup for more than two decades, the United States team lost both the 1985 and 1987 matches. At the 1989 matches, the pressure was on the United States team and its captain, Raymond Floyd. At a pre-match opening celebration, Floyd slighted the European team by introducing his United States team as "the 12 greatest players in the world."

The competition saw the beginnings of a feud between Seve Ballesteros and Paul Azinger. Early in their singles match, Ballesteros sought to change a scuffed ball for a new ball under Rule of Golf 5–3. Somewhat unusually, Azinger disputed whether the ball was unfit for play. A referee was called, and sided with Azinger in ruling the ball fit for play. Ballesteros reportedly said to Azinger, "Is this the way you want to play today?" The match continued in a contentious fashion, culminating in Ballesteros unusually contesting whether Azinger took a proper drop after hitting into the water on the 18th hole.

The American team's frustration grew as the matches ended in a tie, with the European team retaining the cup.

=== 1991: "The War on the Shore" ===
The overall tension between the teams and the feud between Ballesteros and Azinger escalated at the Kiawah Island Golf Resort in 1991. At the ceremonial opening dinner, the PGA of America played two videos that were seen as less than hospitable by the European team. The first video was presented as a highlight reel of past Ryder Cups, but reportedly showed only Americans. The second video was a welcoming address by then-United States President George H. W. Bush in which he closed by cheering on the American side.

On the first morning of the competition, Azinger and Chip Beck were paired against Ballesteros and José María Olazábal in a foursomes match, an alternate shot event. Azinger and Beck accused Ballesteros of gamesmanship on account of his throat clearing during Beck's shots. Later in the same match, Azinger and Beck, who were playing the same brand and make of ball but each with a slightly different model, switched their balls. While this switching was unlikely to have resulted in an advantage or to have been intentional, it was in violation of the "one ball rule" which was in effect for the competition. Under that rule, a player is prohibited from changing the type of ball he uses during the course of a match.

A few holes after the switch had occurred, Ballesteros called the Americans for the violation. Azinger, seeming to feel that his integrity was being questioned, said "I can tell you we're not trying to cheat." Ballesteros responded, "Oh no. Breaking the rules and cheating are two different things." As the violation was called too long after it had occurred, no penalty was assessed against the American pair. The constant goading between Ballesteros and Azinger intensified their respective desires to win. Out of that intensity, they and their playing partners produced what may be regarded as one of the best pairs matches in history, with the Spaniards winning 2 & 1. After the matches concluded, Ballesteros reportedly said, "The American team has 11 nice guys. And Paul Azinger."

The 1991 matches received the sobriquet "the War on the Shore" after some excitable advertising in the American media, and intense home-team cheering by the American home crowds. For his part, Corey Pavin caused controversy by sporting a Desert Storm baseball cap during the event in support of the U.S. and coalition war effort in Iraq.

The matches culminated in one of the single most dramatic putts in the history of golf. With only one match remaining to be completed, between Hale Irwin for the United States and Bernhard Langer for the Europeans, the United States team led by one point. Irwin and Langer came to the last hole tied. To win the cup, the American team needed Irwin to win or tie the match by winning or tying the hole. The Europeans could keep the cup with a win by Langer. Both players struggled on the hole, and found themselves facing a pair of putts; Langer had a six-foot, side-hill par putt, and Irwin had a generally uphill, 18-inch putt for bogey. To the surprise of his teammates, Langer conceded Irwin's bogey putt, leaving himself in a must-make position. Langer missed his putt, the match was halved, and the U.S. team took back the cup.

Players on both sides were driven to public tears by the pressure of the matches on the final day. The intense competition of the 1991 Ryder Cup is widely regarded as having elevated public interest in the series.

=== 1999: Battle of Brookline ===
The 1999 Ryder Cup held at The Country Club in Brookline, Massachusetts, caused great controversy. A remarkable comeback by the American team helped propel the U.S. to a 14 1/2–13 1/2 victory after trailing 10–6 at the start of the final day. The U.S. defeated Europe 8 1/2–3 1/2 in the singles matches to seal the first American victory since 1993.

The competition turned on the 17th hole of a match between American Justin Leonard and Spaniard José María Olazábal. With the match all square, Leonard needed to earn at least a half-point to seal an American victory. After Olazábal's second shot left him with a 22-foot putt on the par-4, Leonard hit his shot within 10 feet of the hole and then watched it roll away from the cup, leaving him with a 45-foot putt for birdie. Leonard had made putts of 25 and 35 feet earlier in the round. Leonard holed the putt, and a wild celebration followed with other U.S. players, their wives, and a few fans running onto the green. The putt did not guarantee a half-point for Leonard since Olazábal could still hole his putt and win the last hole. However, Olazábal missed his putt, and the American team celebrated once again, although the second celebration was more reserved than the first one.

There was considerable bad blood after the event, with some of the European players complaining about the behavior of the American galleries throughout the match. Sam Torrance branded it "disgusting", while European captain Mark James referred to it as a "bear pit" in a book recounting the event. There were also reports that a spectator spat at James' wife. Payne Stewart had conceded his singles match to Colin Montgomerie with both players level and on the last green in 2 shots as a response to the abuse Montgomerie had received throughout the match.

Following the 1999 Ryder Cup, many members of the U.S. team apologised for their behavior, and there were numerous attempts by both teams to calm the increasing nationalism of the event.

=== 2012: The Miracle at Medinah ===
The 39th Ryder Cup was held at the Medinah Country Club in Medinah, Illinois. Under captain José María Olazábal of Spain; the Europeans were down 10–4 after 14 matches, with two four-ball matches still on the course and 12 singles matches to be played the next day. At the end of day two, Ian Poulter made five birdies on the final five holes to give him and Rory McIlroy the point over Jason Dufner and Zach Johnson. Despite being down 10–6 going into the final day Europe came back to win by 14 1/2 points to 13 1/2. Out of the 12 points available on the final day Europe won 8 1/2 points with the U.S. winning only 3 1/2 points. In terms of points this feat matched the Americans' 1999 comeback at Brookline Country Club.

Martin Kaymer struck the putt that retained the cup for Europe. The putt was almost identical in length to the one that fellow German Bernhard Langer missed at the 1991 Ryder Cup. Francesco Molinari secured the final half-point to win the Ryder Cup outright by winning the 18th hole to halve his match against Tiger Woods. Ian Poulter of the European team finished this Ryder Cup with a perfect 4–0 record.

The event is often referred to as the "Meltdown at Medinah" in the United States or the "Miracle at Medinah" in Europe.

=== Cancellations and postponements ===
==== 1939 Ryder Cup ====
The 1939 Ryder Cup was planned for 18–19 November at Ponte Vedra Country Club in Jacksonville, Florida; Walter Hagen was chosen as non-playing captain of the U.S. team. The competition was cancelled shortly after the outbreak of World War II in Europe in September. It would have been the first Ryder Cup to be held in Florida; the competition was not held there until 1983.

In early April 1939, the British P.G.A. chose a selection committee of six and selected Henry Cotton as captain. In August, eight players were named in the team: Cotton, Jimmy Adams, Dick Burton, Sam King, Alf Padgham, Dai Rees, Charles Whitcombe, and Reg Whitcombe. Charles Whitcombe immediately withdrew from the team, not wishing to travel to the United States. With seven selected, three places were left to be filled. War was declared on 3 September and the British P.G.A. immediately cancelled the match: "The P.G.A. announce that the Ryder Cup match for this year has been cancelled by the state of war prevailing in this country. The P.G.A. of the United States is being informed."

==== 1941, 1943, and 1945 Ryder Cups ====
The Ryder Cup was not played in these scheduled years due to World War II; by the autumn of 1945, many members of the British team were still in the military. After a decade-long absence, it resumed in November 1947 at the Portland Golf Club in Portland, Oregon.

==== 2001 Ryder Cup ====
The competition, scheduled for 28–30 September at The Belfry's Brabazon Course, was postponed a year because of the September 11 terrorist attacks. "The PGA of America has informed the European Ryder Cup Board that the scope of the last Tuesday's tragedy is so overwhelming that it would not be possible for the United States Ryder Cup team and officials to attend the match this month." The manager of Phil Mickelson and Mark Calcavecchia had earlier announced that the two players would not travel to Europe. Other American players were said to be concerned about attending the event. It was played in 2002 at the original venue with the same teams that had been selected to play a year earlier. The display boards at The Belfry still read "The 2001 Ryder Cup", and U.S. captain Curtis Strange deliberately referred to his team as "The 2001 Ryder Cup Team" in his speech at the closing ceremony.

It was later decided to hold the subsequent Ryder Cup in 2004 (rather than 2003) and thereafter in even-numbered years. This change also affected the men's Presidents Cup and Seve Trophy and women's Solheim Cup competitions, as each switched from even to odd years.

==== 2020 Ryder Cup ====
In July 2020, the Ryder Cup, scheduled to be held at Whistling Straits in Wisconsin, was postponed for a year due to the COVID-19 pandemic. As a consequence, all future editions of the Ryder Cup are again taking place in odd-numbered years from 2021, as was the case up to 1999, and the Presidents Cup and Solheim Cup competitions reverted to even-numbered years from 2022 and 2024 respectively, as was the case up to 2000 and 2002, respectively.

== Results ==
=== Summary ===
Team	From	To	Matches	Wins	Losses	Ties	Win %
United States	1927	2025	45	27	16	2	60%
Great Britain, (United Kingdom) (Republic of Ireland) Great Britain & Ireland	1927	1977	22	3	18	1	13.64%
Europe	1979	2025	23	13	9	1	56.52%
Europe, (United Kingdom) (Republic of Ireland) Great Britain & Ireland	1927	2025	45	16	27	2	35.56%

Up to date as of 2025 Ryder Cup

Although the team was referred to as "Great Britain" up to 1971, a number of golfers from Ireland and the Channel Islands had played for Great Britain before that date. In 1973, the official team name was changed to "Great Britain and Ireland".

The team in place of the original "Great Britain" team has been referred to as "Europe" since 1979, when players from continental Europe were included. Since then, the "United States" team has won 9 matches and the "Europe" team has won 13 matches, while retaining the Ryder Cup once with a tie.

=== Editions ===
#	Year	Dates (Note: Dates include all days on which play took place or was planned to take place.)	Winners	Score	Host location	Course	U.S. captain	European captain	U.S. top point scorer (Note: If more than one player ties for top points scorer, players with the highest win% are shown)	European top point scorer
United States v Europe (1979 to present)
45th	2025	25–28 Sep	Europe	15– 13	New York; United States	Bethpage State Park (Black Course), Farmingdale	Keegan; Bradley	Luke; Donald	Young; Schauffele; 3 / 4	Fleetwood; 4 / 5
44th	2023	29 Sep– 1 Oct	Europe	16 1/2– 11 1/2	Italy; Europe	Marco Simone Golf and Country Club, Guidonia Montecelio, Lazio	Zach; Johnson	Luke; Donald (Note: Henrik Stenson was originally named as captain of the European Team, but was removed from the role in July 2022. Luke Donald was named as replacement 1 August 2022)	Homa; 3.5 / 5	McIlroy; 4 / 5
43rd	~~2020~~ (Note: Deferred due to the COVID-19 pandemic); 2021	24–26 Sep	United States	19– 9	Wisconsin; United States	Whistling Straits (Straits), Haven	Steve; Stricker	Pádraig; Harrington	Johnson; 5 / 5	Rahm; 3.5 / 5
42nd	2018	28–30 Sep	Europe	17 1/2– 10 1/2	France; Europe	Le Golf National (Albatros), Guyancourt, Île-de-France	Jim; Furyk	Thomas; Bjørn	Thomas; 4 / 5	Molinari; 5 / 5
41st	2016	30 Sep– 2 Oct	United States	17– 11	Minnesota; United States	Hazeltine National Golf Club, Chaska	Davis; Love III	Darren; Clarke	Reed; 3.5 / 5	Pieters; 4 / 5
40th	2014	26–28 Sep	Europe	16 1/2– 11 1/2	Scotland; Europe	Gleneagles Hotel (PGA Centenary), Perthshire	Tom; Watson	Paul; McGinley	Reed; 3.5 / 4	Rose; 4 / 5
39th	2012	28–30 Sep	Europe	14 1/2– 13 1/2	Illinois; United States	Medinah Country Club (No. 3), DuPage County	Davis; Love III	José María; Olazábal	Johnson; 3 / 3	Poulter; 4 / 4
38th	2010	1–4 Oct	Europe	14 1/2– 13 1/2	Wales; Europe	Celtic Manor Resort (The Twenty Ten), Newport	Corey; Pavin	Colin; Montgomerie	Stricker; Woods; 3 / 4	Donald; Poulter; 3 / 4
37th	2008	19–21 Sep	United States	16 1/2– 11 1/2	Kentucky; United States	Valhalla Golf Club, Louisville	Paul; Azinger	Nick; Faldo	Mahan; 3.5 / 5	Poulter; 4 / 5
36th	2006	22–24 Sep	Europe	18 1/2– 9 1/2	Ireland; Europe	K Club (Palmer North), County Kildare	Tom; Lehman	Ian; Woosnam	Woods; 3 / 5	García; Westwood; 4 / 5
35th	2004	17–19 Sep	Europe	18 1/2– 9 1/2	Michigan; United States	Oakland Hills Country Club (South), Birmingham	Hal; Sutton	Bernhard; Langer	DiMarco; 2.5 / 4	García; Westwood; 4.5 / 5
34th	~~2001~~ (Note: Deferred due to the 9/11 attacks); 2002	27–29 Sep	Europe	15 1/2– 12 1/2	England; Europe	The Belfry (Brabazon), Warwickshire	Curtis; Strange	Sam; Torrance	Toms; 3.5 / 5	Montgomerie; 4.5 / 5
33rd	1999	24–26 Sep	United States	14 1/2– 13 1/2	Massachusetts; United States	The Country Club (Championship), Brookline	Ben; Crenshaw	Mark; James	Sutton; 3.5 / 5	García; Lawrie; Montgomerie; Parnevik; 3.5 / 5
32nd	1997	26–28 Sep	Europe	14 1/2– 13 1/2	Spain; Europe	Valderrama Golf Club, Andalusia	Tom; Kite	Seve; Ballesteros	Hoch; 2.5 / 3	Montgomerie; 3.5 / 5
31st	1995	22–24 Sep	Europe	14 1/2– 13 1/2	New York; United States	Oak Hill Country Club (East), Monroe County	Lanny; Wadkins	Bernard; Gallacher	Pavin; 4 / 5	Gilford; 3 / 4
30th	1993	24–26 Sep	United States	15– 13	England; Europe	The Belfry (Brabazon), Warwickshire	Tom; Watson	Bernard; Gallacher	Floyd; Stewart; 3 / 4	Woosnam; 4.5 / 5
29th	1991	27–29 Sep	United States	14 1/2– 13 1/2	South Carolina; United States	Kiawah Island Golf Resort (Ocean), Charleston County	Dave; Stockton	Bernard; Gallacher	Couples; Wadkins; 3.5 / 5	Ballesteros; 4.5 / 5
28th	1989	22–24 Sep	Tied; Europe retains	14– 14	England; Europe	The Belfry (Brabazon), Warwickshire	Raymond; Floyd	Tony; Jacklin	Beck; 3.5 / 4	Olazábal; 4.5 / 5
27th	1987	25–27 Sep	Europe	15– 13	Ohio; United States	Muirfield Village, Dublin	Jack; Nicklaus	Tony; Jacklin	Kite; Sutton; 3 / 5	Ballesteros; 4 / 5
26th	1985	13–15 Sep	Europe	16 1/2– 11 1/2	England; Europe	The Belfry (Brabazon), Warwickshire	Lee; Trevino	Tony; Jacklin	Stadler; Wadkins; 3 / 5	Piñero; 4 / 5
25th	1983	14–16 Oct	United States	14 1/2– 13 1/2	Florida; United States	PGA National Resort (Champion), Palm Beach Gardens	Jack; Nicklaus	Tony; Jacklin	Watson; 4 / 5	Faldo; Langer; 4 / 5
24th	1981	18–20 Sep	United States	18 1/2– 9 1/2	England; Europe	Walton Heath Golf Club, Surrey	Dave; Marr	John; Jacobs	Nelson; Nicklaus; Trevino; 4 / 4	Piñero; 2 / 4
23rd	1979	14–16 Sep	United States	17– 11	West Virginia; United States	The Greenbrier, White Sulphur Springs	Billy; Casper	John; Jacobs	Nelson; 5 / 5	Gallacher; 4 / 5
United States v Great Britain & Ireland (1973 to 1977)
22nd	1977	15–17 Sep	United States	12 1/2– 7 1/2	England; GB & Ireland	Royal Lytham & St Annes, Lancashire	Dow; Finsterwald	Brian; Huggett	Wadkins; 3 / 3	Faldo; 3 / 3
21st	1975	19–21 Sep	United States	21– 11	Pennsylvania; United States	Laurel Valley Golf Club, Westmoreland County	Arnold; Palmer	Bernard; Hunt	Irwin; 4.5 / 5	Oosterhuis; 3.5 / 6
20th	1973	20–22 Sep	United States	19– 13	Scotland; GB & Ireland	Muirfield, East Lothian	Jack; Burke Jr.	Bernard; Hunt	Nicklaus; 4.5 / 6	Oosterhuis; 4 / 6
United States v Great Britain (1923 to 1971)
19th	1971	16– 18 Sep	United States	18 1/2– 13 1/2	Missouri; United States	Old Warson Country Club, St. Louis	Jay; Hebert	Eric; Brown	Palmer; 4.5 / 6	Gallacher; 3.5 / 5
18th	1969	18– 20 Sep	Tied; United States retains	16– 16	England; Great Britain	Royal Birkdale Golf Club, Merseyside	Sam; Snead	Eric; Brown	Hill; 4 / 6	Jacklin; 5 / 6
17th	1967	20– 22 Oct	United States	23 1/2– 8 1/2	Texas; United States	Champions Golf Club, Houston	Ben; Hogan	Dai; Rees	Palmer; Dickinson; 5 / 5	Thomas; 3 / 5
16th	1965	7– 9 Oct	United States	19 1/2– 12 1/2	England; Great Britain	Royal Birkdale Golf Club, Merseyside	Byron; Nelson	Harry; Weetman	Lema; 5 / 6	Alliss; 5 / 6
15th	1963	11– 13 Oct	United States	23– 9	Georgia; United States	Atlanta Athletic Club, (Note: This is the original course of the Atlanta Athletic Club, not its current course in the suburb of Johns Creek, Georgia. The AAC sold its original course and its downtown Atlanta building in 1967 to finance its move to its current location. The original AAC course is now home to East Lake Golf Club.); Atlanta	Arnold; Palmer	John; Fallon	Casper; 4.5 / 5	Huggett; 2.5 / 5
14th	1961	13– 14 Oct	United States	14 1/2– 9 1/2	England; Great Britain	Royal Lytham & St Annes, Lancashire	Jerry; Barber	Dai; Rees	Palmer; 3.5 / 4	Rees; 3 / 4
13th	1959	6– 7 Nov	United States	8 1/2– 3 1/2	California; United States	Eldorado Country Club; Indian Wells	Sam; Snead	Dai; Rees	Finsterwald; Rosburg; Souchak; 2 / 2	Alliss; 1.5 / 2
12th	1957	4– 5 Oct	(United Kingdom) Great Britain	7 1/2– 4 1/2	England; Great Britain	Lindrick Golf Club, Nottinghamshire	Jack; Burke Jr.	Dai; Rees	Mayer; 1.5 / 2	Bousfield; Rees; 2 / 2
11th	1955	5– 6 Nov	United States	8– 4	California; United States	Thunderbird Country Club, Riverside County	Chick; Harbert	Dai; Rees	Bolt; Burke Jr.; Ford; Snead; 2 / 2	Jacobs; 2 / 2
10th	1953	2– 3 Oct	United States	6 1/2– 5 1/2	England; Great Britain	Wentworth Club, Surrey	Lloyd; Mangrum	Henry; Cotton	Burke Jr. 2 / 2	Bradshaw; Daly; 2 / 2
9th	1951	2– 4 Nov	United States	9 1/2– 2 1/2	North Carolina; United States	Pinehurst Resort (No. 2), Moore County	Sam; Snead	Arthur; Lacey	Burke Jr.; Demaret; Hogan; Mangrum; Snead; 2 / 2	Lees; 2 / 2
8th	1949	16– 17 Sep	United States	7– 5	England; Great Britain	Ganton Golf Club; Yorkshire	Ben; Hogan	Charles; Whitcombe	Demaret; Heafner; 2 / 2	Adams; 2 / 2
7th	1947	1– 2 Nov	United States	11– 1	Oregon; United States	Portland Golf Club, Portland	Ben; Hogan	Henry; Cotton	Demaret; Mangrum; Nelson; Oliver; Snead; Worsham; 2 / 2	King; 1 / 2
1939, 1941, 1943, and 1945: No Ryder Cups because of World War II
6th	1937	29– 30 Jun	United States	8– 4	England; Great Britain	Southport and Ainsdale Golf Club, Merseyside	Walter; Hagen	Charles; Whitcombe	Dudley; Guldahl; 2 / 2	Rees; 1.5 / 2
5th	1935	28– 29 Sep	United States	9– 3	New Jersey; United States	Ridgewood Country Club, Bergen County	Walter; Hagen	Charles; Whitcombe	Picard; Revolta; Runyan; Sarazen; 2 / 2	Whitcombe; 1 / 1
4th	1933	25– 26 Jun	(United Kingdom) Great Britain	6 1/2– 5 1/2	England; Great Britain	Southport and Ainsdale Golf Club, Merseyside	Walter; Hagen	John Henry; Taylor	Hagen; Sarazen; 1.5 / 2	Easterbrook; Havers; Mitchell; 2 / 2
3rd	1931	26– 27 Jun	United States	9– 3	Ohio; United States	Scioto Country Club, Upper Arlington	Walter; Hagen	Charles; Whitcombe	Burke; Cox; Hagen; Sarazen; Shute; 2 / 2	Davies; Havers; Mitchell; Robson; 1 / 2
2nd	1929	26– 27 Apr	(United Kingdom) Great Britain	7– 5	England; Great Britain	Moortown Golf Club, Yorkshire	Walter; Hagen	George; Duncan	Diegel; 2 / 2	Compston; Whitcombe; 1.5 / 2
1st	1927	3– 4 Jun	United States	9 1/2– 2 1/2	Massachusetts; United States	Worcester Country Club, Worcester County	Walter; Hagen	Ted; Ray	Farrell; Golden; Hagen; Watrous; 2 / 2	Whitcombe; 1.5 / 2

Reference : 2014 Media Guide; Ryder Cup website

== Future venues ==
Year	Edition	Hosts	Course	Location	Dates	Last hosted	Ref
2027	46th	Europe	Adare Manor	Adare, County Limerick, Ireland	September 17–19	n/a	
2029	47th	United States	Hazeltine National Golf Club	Chaska, Minnesota, United States		2016	
2031	48th	Europe	Camiral Golf & Wellness	Caldes de Malavella, Catalonia, Spain		n/a	
2033	49th	United States	Olympic Club, Lake Course	San Francisco, California, United States		n/a	
2035	50th	Europe	Not yet awarded				
2037	51st	United States	Congressional Country Club, Blue Course	Bethesda, Maryland, United States		n/a	

In 2001, the PGA European Tour decided to put out the Ryder Cup hosting rights from 2018 through 2030 to a competitive bid process throughout Europe.

== Television ==
The Ryder Cup matches were always covered by the BBC, whether in Britain or in the United States, even prior to the British team's merger with Europe. But in the 1970s ITV gained the rights to the Ryder Cup showing the 1973, 1975 (in the US), and 1977 cups. ITV had the 1979 rights (hosted in the US, and the first with a European team) but the 1979 Cup ended up not being televised in the UK due to the 1979 ITV strike. In 1981 the BBC regained the rights, covering the 1981, 1983, 1985, 1987, 1989, 1991 and 1993 cups. In the 1990s, Sky Sports became heavily involved in the Ryder Cup, and has been the exclusive live broadcaster of the event since 1995, including temporarily rebranding their Sky Sports Golf channel as 'Sky Sports Ryder Cup' for the tournament weekend (since 2014). The BBC still screens edited highlights each night, and has done so since 1997.

In the United States, the Ryder Cup was first televised live at the 1983 matches in Florida, with ABC Sports covering just the final four holes of the singles matches. A highlight package of the 1985 singles matches was produced by ESPN, but no live coverage aired from England. In 1987, with the matches back in the United States, ABC covered both weekend days, but only in the late afternoon.

In 1989, USA Network began a long association with the Ryder Cup by televising all three days live from England, the first live coverage of a Ryder Cup from Europe. This led to a one-year deal for the 1991 matches in South Carolina to be carried by NBC live on the weekend, with USA Network continuing to provide live coverage of the first day. All five sessions were broadcast for the first time. The success of the 1991 matches led to a contract extension with USA and NBC through 1997, marking a turning point in the competition's popularity. For the European matches, the first two days were taped and aired on delay in the U.S. Another extension with USA and NBC covering the 1999–2003 (later moved to 2004) competitions increased the number of hours of coverage to include the entire first day and most of the second day. Tape delay was still employed for competitions from Europe.

The Ryder Cup's increased success led to a landmark contract with NBC (which had recently bought USA Network) to air the 2006–14 competitions on USA and NBC. It called for a record increase in coverage hours, with the second day now having near-complete coverage. Tape delay was last used for the 2006 event in Ireland. In 2006, ESPN was sub-licensed rights to Friday coverage, as part of a larger transaction between NBC and Disney that also resulted in ABC Sports personality Al Michaels moving to NBC to join their then-upcoming Sunday-night NFL games, ESPN gaining expanded access to highlights from events whose rights are owned by NBC, and Disney acquiring the rights to the cartoon character Oswald the Lucky Rabbit (who was created by Walt Disney in 1927 for a series of animated shorts distributed by Universal Pictures).

In 2013, NBC reached a deal to extend its rights to the Ryder Cup and Senior PGA Championship through 2030, with Friday coverage of the Ryder Cup being assumed by Golf Channel.

For 2018, Golf Channel and NBC had a combined total of 30.5 hours of coverage; Golf Channel had 13.5 hours, and NBC had 17 hours. Ninety minutes of Golf Channel and NBC's time overlapped, amounting to a net total of 29 hours of real time coverage.

For 2021, Golf Channel and NBC had a combined total of 28 hours of coverage; Golf Channel had 12 hours, and NBC had 16 hours. All broadcasts were also shown on Peacock, along with the websites and mobile apps of both NBC Sports and the Ryder Cup.

== Records ==
- Most appearances: 12
  ° Phil Mickelson (USA), 1995–2018
- Most points: 28 1/2
  ° Sergio García (Eur) (25–13–7 record)
- Most singles points won: 7
  ° Colin Montgomerie (Eur) (6–0–2 record)
  ° Billy Casper (USA) (6–2–2 record)
  ° Lee Trevino (USA) (6–2–2 record)
  ° Arnold Palmer (USA) (6–3–2 record)
  ° Neil Coles (GB, GB&I) (5–6–4 record)
- Most foursomes points won: 13 1/2
  ° Sergio García (Eur) (12–4–3 record)
- Most fourball points won: 10 1/2
  ° Ian Woosnam (Eur) (10–3–1 record)
  ° José María Olazábal (Eur) (9–2–3 record)
  ° Sergio García (Eur) (9–4–3 record)
- Most points won by a pairing: 12
  ° Seve Ballesteros and José María Olazábal (Eur) (11–2–2 record)
- Top point percentage (minimum of 3 Ryder Cup matches)
  ° Jimmy Demaret (USA) (6–0–0) 100.0%
  ° Jack Burke Jr. (USA) (7–1–0) 87.5%
  ° Horton Smith (USA) (3–0–1) 87.5%
  ° Walter Hagen (USA) (7–1–1) 83.3%
  ° J. C. Snead (USA) (9–2–0) 81.8%
  ° Sam Snead (USA) (10–2–1) 80.8%
- Most points in a single contest: 5
  ° Tony Lema (USA) (5–1–0) 1965
  ° Peter Alliss (GB) (5–1–0) 1965
  ° Gardner Dickinson (USA) (5–0–0) 1967
  ° Arnold Palmer (USA) (5–0–0) 1967
  ° Tony Jacklin (GB) (4–0–2) 1969
  ° Jack Nicklaus (USA) (5–1–0) 1971
  ° Larry Nelson (USA) (5–0–0) 1979
  ° Francesco Molinari (Eur) (5–0–0) 2018
  ° Dustin Johnson (USA) (5–0–0) 2021
- Youngest player: 19 years, 258 days
  ° Sergio García (Eur) 1999
- Oldest player: 51 years, 20 days
  ° Raymond Floyd (USA) 1993

== Traditions ==
If one of the golfers is injured and cannot play his singles match, the opposing captain can select one player from his team that he would like to not compete. The nominated player is then matched up against the injured player and the match recorded as a half. There is one stipulation – each captain must place the name of their nominated player in an envelope prior to the start of the matches. The "envelope rule", as it has known, has come into play three times since 1979, including most recently in 2025 when Europe's Viktor Hovland injured his neck during Saturday's matches and was unable to compete in the Sunday singles. Harris English was the player that American captain Keegan Bradley placed in the envelope, and their match was recorded as halved.

Teams have also used the competition to pay tribute to recently deceased legends:

- In 2012 at Medinah, victorious captain Olazábal dedicated the victory to his countryman Ballesteros. The five-time major champion, who had scored 22 1/2 points in 37 matches and been part of four victorious European sides before captaining them to victory on home soil at Valderrama in 1997, had died of brain cancer in May 2011 at the age of 54, and in his memory, Team Europe wore navy blue and white garments – his traditional Sunday colors – on the final day. Additionally, the European kit also bore the silhouette of Ballesteros famously pumping his fist after winning the 1984 Open Championship at the Old Course at St Andrews.
- In 2016 at Hazeltine, both teams paid tribute to Palmer after he died five days before the competition at the age of 85 while awaiting heart surgery. The seven-time major champion, who had won more than 22 Ryder Cup matches during five American victories (including one as Team USA's last playing captain) and been the non-playing captain during a sixth, had a video tribute and also opening ceremony tributes from both captains (Love and Clarke) and both honorary captains (Nicklaus and Jacklin), and his bag from the 1975 competition at Laurel Valley was placed on the first tee during Friday's opening foursomes in his honor. Team USA also swept the opening foursomes for the first time since 1975, and after Team USA regained the Cup, Love also dedicated the victory to Palmer. Two days after the competition, the majority of Team USA also attended Palmer's public memorial at St. Vincent College in his hometown of Latrobe, Pennsylvania and brought the Cup at the request of Palmer's daughter Amy.

== Similar golf events ==
The Presidents Cup is similar to the Ryder Cup, except that the competing sides are a U.S. side and an International side from the rest of the world consisting of players who are ineligible for the Ryder Cup. It is held in years when there is no Ryder Cup.

Other important team golf events between U.S. and either Europe or Great Britain and Ireland include:

- Curtis Cup – Event for amateur women between a U.S. side and a team drawn from Great Britain and Ireland.
- Junior Ryder Cup – A match between U.S. and European juniors involving both boys and girls.
- Junior Solheim Cup – A match between U.S. and European junior girls.
- PGA Cup – A match between U.S. and Great Britain and Ireland club professionals.
- Solheim Cup – The women's equivalent of the Ryder Cup, featuring the same U.S. against Europe format.
- Walker Cup – Men's amateur event analogous to the Curtis Cup.

== See also ==
- List of American Ryder Cup golfers
- List of European Ryder Cup golfers
