= Jay Hebert =

American professional golfer (1923–1997)

Personal information
- Full name: Junius Joseph Hebert
- Nickname: Jay
- Nationality: United States
- Born: February 14, 1923 St. Martinville, Louisiana, U.S.
- Died: May 25, 1997 (aged 74) Houston, Texas, U.S.
- Height: 6 ft 0 in (1.83 m)
- Weight: 175 lb (79 kg; 12.5 st)
- Spouse: Barbara J. Henny
- Children: 2

Career
- Sport: Golf
- College: Southwestern Louisiana; Louisiana State
- Turned professional: 1949
- Former tour: PGA Tour
- Professional wins: 10

Number of wins by tour
- PGA Tour: 5
- Other: 5

Best results in major championships (wins: 1)
- Masters Tournament: T8: 1959
- PGA Championship: Won: 1960
- U.S. Open: T7: 1958
- The Open Championship: DNP

Jay Hebert
- Military career
- Allegiance: United States
- Branch: U.S. Marine Corps
- Rank: Captain
- Unit: 5th Marine Division
- Conflicts: World War II; Pacific theater Battle of Iwo Jima
- Awards: Purple Heart

Junius Joseph "Jay" Hebert (February 14, 1923 – May 25, 1997) was an American professional golfer. He won seven times on the PGA Tour including the 1960 PGA Championship. His younger brother, Lionel Hebert, also won the PGA Championship, in 1957, the last edition at match play. Jay played on the 1959 and 1961 Ryder Cup teams and was captain for the 1971 team.

== Career ==
Hebert served in the Marines in World War II and rose to the rank of captain. He was wounded in the left thigh at the Battle of Iwo Jima and awarded a Purple Heart. Following the war, he played golf at LSU, where he and teammate Gardner Dickinson led the Tigers to the national championship in 1947.

Hebert worked as the playing pro at Mayfair Country Club in Sanford, Florida, in the 1950s. The club was home to a PGA Tour event, the Mayfair Inn Open, from 1955 to 1958.

== Personal life ==
A Cajun by ethnicity, he was born in St. Martinville, Louisiana, and died in Houston, Texas. His son, Jean-Paul Hebert, played golf at the University of Texas.

== Awards and honors ==
- In 1982, Hebert was inducted into the Louisiana Sports Hall of Fame.
- In 1982, he was inducted into the Texas Golf Hall of Fame.

== Professional wins (10) ==
=== PGA Tour wins (5) ===
Legend
Major championships (1)
Other PGA Tour (6)

No.	Date	Tournament	Winning score	To par	Margin of victory	Runner(s)-up
1	Feb 17, 1957	Texas Open Invitational	68-69-67-67=271	−13	1 stroke	(United States) Ed Furgol
2	Oct 18, 1959	Orange County Open Invitational	68-68-68-69=273	−11	2 strokes	(United States) Jack Fleck, (Canada) Jerry Magee
3	Jul 24, 1960	PGA Championship	72-67-72-70=281	+1	1 stroke	(Australia) Jim Ferrier
4	Apr 24, 1961	Houston Classic	69-71-69-67=276	−4	Playoff	(United States) Ken Venturi
5	Aug 27, 1961	American Golf Classic	70-67-68-73=278	−2	Playoff	(South Africa) Gary Player

PGA Tour playoff record (2–1)

No.	Year	Tournament	Opponent(s)	Result
1	1956	Western Open	(United States) Mike Fetchick, (United States) Doug Ford (United States) Don January	Fetchick won 18-hole playoff; Fetchick: −6 (66), Hebert: −1 (71), Ford: E (72), January: +3 (75)
2	1961	Houston Classic	(United States) Ken Venturi	Won with birdie on first extra hole after 18-hole playoff; Hebert: −1 (69), Venturi: −1 (69)
3	1961	American Golf Classic	(South Africa) Gary Player	Won with birdie on second extra hole

=== Other wins (5) ===
- 1954 Long Island Open
- 1955 Long Island PGA Championship
- 1957 Bing Crosby National Pro-Am Golf Championship
- 1958 Lafayette Open Invitational
- 1994 Liberty Mutual Legends of Golf – Demaret Division (with Al Balding)

== Major championships ==
=== Wins (1) ===
Year	Championship	54 holes	Winning score	Margin	Runner-up
1960	PGA Championship	1 shot deficit	+1 (72-67-72-70=281)	1 stroke	(Australia) Jim Ferrier

=== Results timeline ===
Tournament	1953	1954	1955	1956	1957	1958	1959
Masters Tournament		T16	T15	T53	10	T9	T8
U.S. Open	T9	17		T17		T7	T17
PGA Championship			R32	R64	7	T5	T25

Tournament	1960	1961	1962	1963	1964	1965	1966	1967	1968	1969
Masters Tournament	T39	T30	WD	27	T30	CUT	T10	T21	T28	
U.S. Open	CUT	T49	T17	T38	CUT	CUT	CUT			
PGA Championship	1	13	10	T40	CUT	T54	T12	CUT	CUT	T63

Tournament	1970	1971	1972	1973	1974	1975	1976	1977
Masters Tournament								
U.S. Open								
PGA Championship		CUT			CUT		CUT	CUT

Note: Hebert never played in The Open Championship.

Win
Top 10
Did not play

CUT = missed the half-way cut (3rd round cut in 1964 PGA Championship)
WD = withdrew
R64, R32, R16, QF, SF, F = Round in which player lost in PGA Championship match play
"T" = tied

=== Summary ===
Tournament	Wins	2nd	3rd	Top-5	Top-10	Top-25	Events	Cuts made
Masters Tournament	0	0	0	0	4	7	15	13
U.S. Open	0	0	0	0	2	6	12	8
The Open Championship	0	0	0	0	0	0	0	0
PGA Championship	1	0	0	2	4	8	19	12
Totals	1	0	0	2	10	21	46	33

- Most consecutive cuts made – 17 (1953 U.S. Open – 1960 Masters)
- Longest streak of top-10s – 6 (1957 Masters – 1959 Masters)

== U.S. national team appearances ==
Professional

- Ryder Cup: 1959 (winners), 1961 (winners), 1971 (non-playing captain, winners)

== See also ==
- List of men's major championships winning golfers

== Video ==
- Jay Hebert on YouTube
