= Johnny Golden =

American professional golfer (1896–1936)

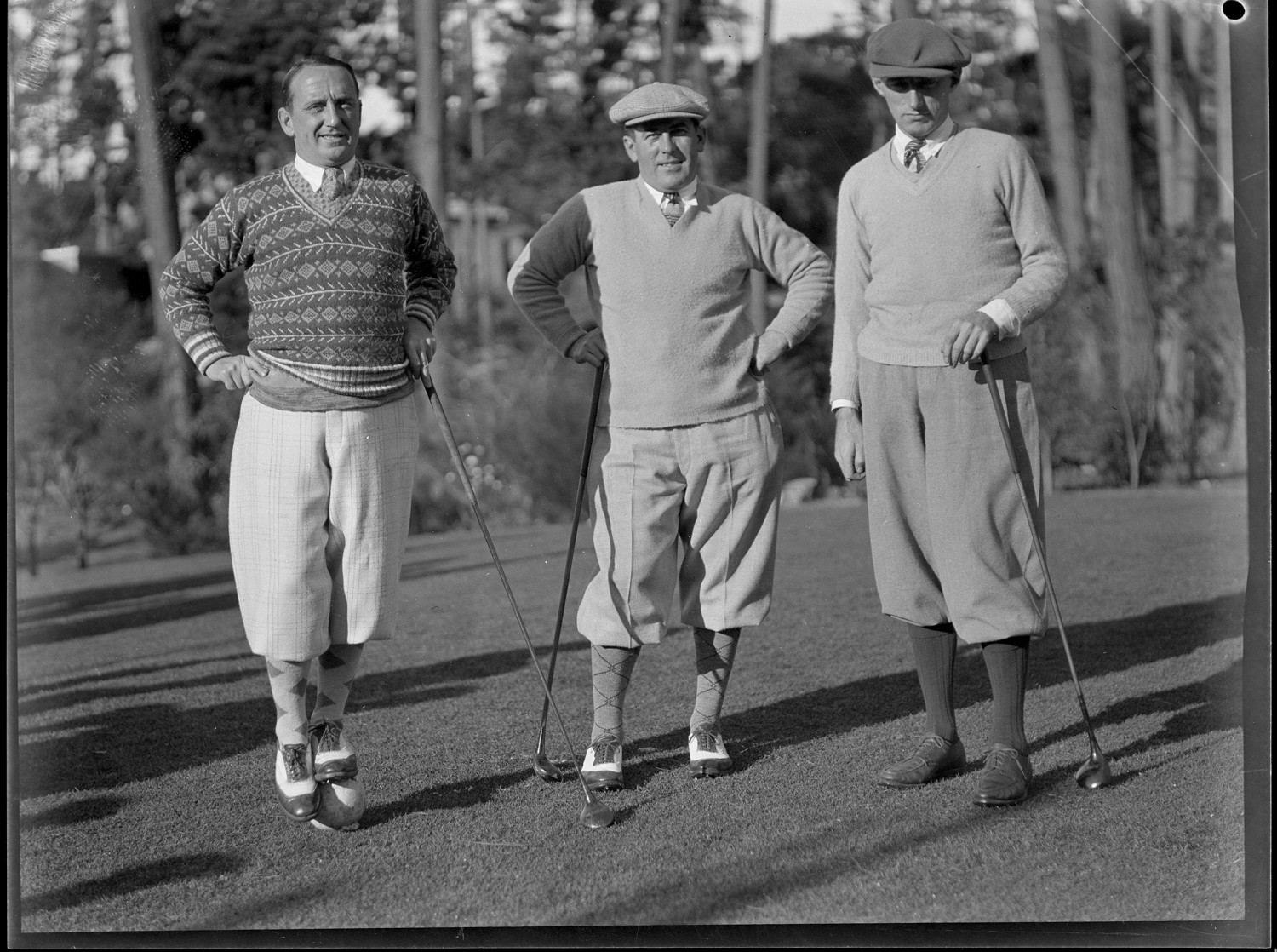
- Bobby Cruickshank, Johnny Golden, Tommy Armour

Personal information
- Full name: John Golden
- Nationality: United States
- Born: April 2, 1896 Tuxedo, New York, U.S.
- Died: January 27, 1936 (aged 39) Stamford, Connecticut, U.S.

Career
- Sport: Golf
- Turned professional: 1924
- Former tour: PGA Tour
- Professional wins: 10

Number of wins by tour
- PGA Tour: 9
- Other: 1

Best results in major championships
- Masters Tournament: T21: 1934
- PGA Championship: T3: 1922, 1926, 1927
- U.S. Open: 5th: 1930
- The Open Championship: T13: 1929

Johnny Golden (April 2, 1896 – January 27, 1936) was an American professional golfer.

== Career ==
In 1896, Golden was born in Tuxedo, New York.

In 1915, Golden turned professional. He was an assistant pro and later head pro at the Tuxedo Club until 1929. That year he took the head job at North Jersey Country Club in Wayne, New Jersey. During his time at the Tuxedo Club, he was a three-time semifinalist in the PGA Championship. In 1922, he lost to Emmet French. In 1926, he dropped a semifinal match to Leo Diegel, and the following year he lost in the semis to Joe Turnesa.

Golden remained in Wayne for just a year, leaving for the head professional job at Wee Burn Country Club near Darien, Connecticut. While serving as the pro at Wee Burn, Golden won four consecutive Connecticut Open titles (1932–35), with the 1932, 1933 and 1935 events retroactively garnering PGA Tour-level status. His most lucrative win came in 1931, at the Agua Caliente Open in Mexico. Golden finished regulation tied with George Von Elm at 293. The duo agreed prior to the playoff to split first- and second-prize money, a common practice, with each player pocketing $6,750. Golden went on to win the playoff. Without the agreement, he would have won $10,000.

Golden played on the first two Ryder Cup teams in 1927 and 1929, compiling a perfect 3-0-0 record, with an 8 & 7 rout of Herbert Jolly in singles in 1927 at Worcester Country Club. His two other Ryder Cup match wins came with Walter Hagen as his teammate, winning foursomes in 1927 and in 1929, at Moortown Golf Club near Leeds, England.

== Personal life ==
In January 1936, Golden died at age 39 in Stamford, Connecticut from pneumonia.

== Awards and honors ==
In 2000, Golden was elected to the Connecticut Golf Hall of Fame.

== Professional wins (10) ==
=== PGA Tour wins (9) ===
- 1927 (1) New Jersey Open
- 1928 (1) New Jersey Open
- 1929 (2) La Jolla Open, New Jersey Open
- 1931 (1) Agua Caliente Open
- 1932 (2) North and South Open, Connecticut Open
- 1933 (1) Connecticut Open
- 1935 (1) Connecticut Open

=== Other wins ===
this list may be incomplete

- 1934 Connecticut Open

== Results in major championships ==
Tournament	1920	1921	1922	1923	1924	1925	1926	1927	1928	1929
U.S. Open	T17	T22	T8		T25	T18	T32	T7	35	T32
The Open Championship										T13
PGA Championship		QF	SF	R16		R16	SF	SF	R32	R32

Tournament	1930	1931	1932	1933	1934	1935
Masters Tournament	NYF	NYF	NYF	NYF	T21	T35
U.S. Open	5	T27	T35	T21	T17	61
The Open Championship						
PGA Championship	R32	R16	R16	QF		R64

Top 10
Did not play

NYF = Tournament not yet founded
R64, R32, R16, QF, SF = Round in which player lost in PGA Championship match play
"T" indicates a tie for a place

=== Summary ===
Tournament	Wins	2nd	3rd	Top-5	Top-10	Top-25	Events	Cuts made
Masters Tournament	0	0	0	0	0	1	2	2
U.S. Open	0	0	0	1	3	9	15	15
The Open Championship	0	0	0	0	0	1	1	1
PGA Championship	0	0	3	5	9	12	13	13
Totals	0	0	3	6	12	23	31	31

- Most consecutive cuts made – 31 (all)
- Longest streak of top-10s – 4 (1921 PGA – 1923 PGA)
