= 1927 Ryder Cup =

Golf tournament in Massachusetts, U.S.; first Ryder Cup

1st Ryder Cup Matches
- Dates: June 3–4, 1927
- Venue: Worcester Country Club
- Location: Worcester, Massachusetts
- Captains: Walter Hagen (USA); Ted Ray (Great Britain)
(United States)	9 1/2	2 1/2	(United Kingdom)
- United States wins the Ryder Cup

Location map
- Location within Massachusetts

The 1st Ryder Cup Matches were held at the Worcester Country Club in Worcester, Massachusetts. The first competition was dominated by the United States who won by the then landslide score of 9 1/2–2 1/2 points. USA Captain Walter Hagen became the first winning captain to lift the Ryder Cup. Samuel Ryder, the competition's founder was unable to be present at Worcester Country Club for the inaugural event due to ill health at the time. Ted Ray was the first captain to represent the Great Britain team.

== Format ==
The Ryder Cup is a match play golf event, with each match worth one point. From this inaugural event through 1959, the format consisted of 4 foursome (alternate shot) matches on the first day and 8 singles matches on the second day, for a total of 12 points. Therefore, 6 1/2 points were required to win the Cup. All matches were played to a maximum of 36 holes.

== Teams ==
Team USA
Name	Age
Walter Hagen – captain	34
Leo Diegel	28
Al Espinosa	36
Johnny Farrell	26
Johnny Golden	31
Bill Mehlhorn	28
Gene Sarazen	25
Joe Turnesa	26
Al Watrous	28

Team Great Britain
Name	Age
(Jersey) Ted Ray – captain	50
(Jersey) Aubrey Boomer	29
(England) Archie Compston	34
(Scotland) George Duncan	43
(England) George Gadd	37
(England) Arthur Havers	28
Herbert Jolly	32
(England) Fred Robson	42
(England) Charles Whitcombe	31

A sub-committee of the Professional Golfers' Association was appointed to choose the Great Britain team for the first official Ryder Cup. This consisted of Harry Vardon, J.H. Taylor and James Braid. In March 1927 an initial group of 9 players was selected to represent Great Britain. These consisted of the above 9 players but with Abe Mitchell instead of Jolly. Later in March it was announced that Abe Mitchell would be the captain of the team. However, in May, his health gave some concern. It was eventually decided that he was unfit to travel. Later he was operated on for appendicitis.

Seven members of the team left on the Aquitania on May 21, Boomer being picked up in Cherbourg. Ray was appointed the new captain. George Philpot, editor of the British Golf Illustrated magazine, was the team manager and travelled with the team. With the team a man short, the PGA Secretary Percy Perrins recruited Jolly who sailed on a later boat, the Majestic, and arrived in New York on May 31, four days after the rest of the team.

== Friday's foursome matches ==
	Results
Ray/Robson	(United States) 2 & 1	Hagen/Golden
Duncan/Compston	(United States) 8 & 6	Farrell/Turnesa
Havers/Jolly	(United States) 3 & 2	Sarazen/Watrous
Boomer/Whitcombe	(United Kingdom) 7 & 5	Diegel/Mehlhorn
1	Session	3
1	Overall	3

== Saturday's singles matches ==
	Results
Archie Compston	(United States) 1 up	Bill Mehlhorn
Aubrey Boomer	(United States) 5 & 4	Johnny Farrell
Herbert Jolly	(United States) 8 & 7	Johnny Golden
Ted Ray	(United States) 7 & 5	Leo Diegel
Charles Whitcombe	halved	Gene Sarazen
Arthur Havers	(United States) 2 & 1	Walter Hagen
Fred Robson	(United States) 3 & 2	Al Watrous
George Duncan	(United Kingdom) 1 up	Joe Turnesa
1 1/2	Session	6 1/2
2 1/2	Overall	9 1/2

== Individual player records ==
Each entry refers to the win–loss–half record of the player.

=== United States ===
Player	Points	Overall	Singles	Foursomes
Leo Diegel	1	1–1–0	1–0–0	0–1–0
Johnny Farrell	2	2–0–0	1–0–0	1–0–0
Johnny Golden	2	2–0–0	1–0–0	1–0–0
Walter Hagen	2	2–0–0	1–0–0	1–0–0
Bill Mehlhorn	1	1–1–0	1–0–0	0–1–0
Gene Sarazen	1.5	1–0–1	0–0–1	1–0–0
Joe Turnesa	1	1–1–0	0–1–0	1–0–0
Al Watrous	2	2–0–0	1–0–0	1–0–0

Al Espinosa did not play in any matches.

=== Great Britain ===
Player	Points	Overall	Singles	Foursomes
Aubrey Boomer	1	1–1–0	0–1–0	1–0–0
Archie Compston	0	0–2–0	0–1–0	0–1–0
George Duncan	1	1–1–0	1–0–0	0–1–0
Arthur Havers	0	0–2–0	0–1–0	0–1–0
Herbert Jolly	0	0–2–0	0–1–0	0–1–0
Ted Ray	0	0–2–0	0–1–0	0–1–0
Fred Robson	0	0–2–0	0–1–0	0–1–0
Charles Whitcombe	1.5	1–0–1	0–0–1	1–0–0

George Gadd did not play in any matches.
