= J. C. Snead =

American professional golfer (1940–2025)

Personal information
- Full name: Jesse Carlyle Snead
- Nationality: United States
- Born: October 14, 1940 Hot Springs, Virginia, U.S.
- Died: April 25, 2025 (aged 84) Hot Springs, Virginia, U.S.
- Height: 6 ft 2 in (1.88 m)
- Weight: 215 lb (98 kg; 15.4 st)

Career
- Sport: Golf
- College: East Tennessee State University
- Turned professional: 1964
- Former tours: PGA Tour; Champions Tour
- Professional wins: 16

Number of wins by tour
- PGA Tour: 8
- PGA Tour of Australasia: 1
- PGA Tour Champions: 4
- Other: 3

Best results in major championships
- Masters Tournament: 2nd: 1973
- PGA Championship: T3: 1973
- U.S. Open: T2: 1978
- The Open Championship: DNP

Jesse Carlyle Snead (October 14, 1940 – April 25, 2025) was an American professional golfer who won tournaments on both the PGA Tour and Champions Tour. Snead was the nephew of hall of famer Sam Snead.

== Early life ==
Snead, who preferred being called by his middle name, Carlyle, was born in Hot Springs, Virginia, where his father worked at The Homestead resort. He attended East Tennessee State University in Johnson City, Tennessee, where he was a member of Sigma Phi Epsilon fraternity. He played pro baseball in the Washington Senators farm system before becoming a professional golfer in 1964. He joined the PGA Tour in 1968.

== Professional career ==
=== PGA Tour ===
Snead won eight tournaments on the PGA Tour and one in international competition. He was a member of the 1971, 1973, and 1975 Ryder Cup teams. Snead's biggest career disappointment was that he never won a major championship on the PGA Tour; however, he made his career mark as one of the tour's most consistent players, with more than seven million dollars in career earnings. Snead recorded two runner-up finishes in majors: 2nd at 1973 Masters Tournament and a tie for 2nd with Dave Stockton at the 1978 U.S. Open. He was also twice runner-up in The Players Championship, in 1974 and 1976, behind Jack Nicklaus on both occasions.

=== Senior career ===
From 1993 to 2002, Snead won four times on the Senior PGA Tour. He defeated Jack Nicklaus in a playoff for the 1995 Ford Senior Players Championship, a senior major championship.

== Personal life and death ==
In his free time, Snead enjoyed hunting and farming. He had one son, Jason. He resided full time in Hot Springs, Virginia and part-time in Hobe Sound, Florida.

Snead died of cancer on April 25, 2025, at the age of 84.

== Awards and honors ==
In 2003, Snead was inducted into the Virginia Sports Hall of Fame.

== Professional wins (15) ==
=== PGA Tour wins (8) ===
| No. | Date | Tournament | Winning score | Margin of victory | Runner(s)-up |
|---|---|---|---|---|---|
| 1 | Feb 21, 1971 | Tucson Open Invitational | −15 (66-71-70-66=273) | 1 stroke | (United States) Dale Douglass |
| 2 | Mar 7, 1971 | Doral-Eastern Open Invitational | −13 (70-70-66-69=275) | 1 stroke | (United States) Gardner Dickinson |
| 3 | Jun 11, 1972 | IVB-Philadelphia Golf Classic | −6 (70-71-69-72=282) | 1 stroke | (United States) Chi-Chi Rodríguez |
| 4 | Feb 16, 1975 | Andy Williams-San Diego Open Invitational | −9 (69-71-71-68=279) | Playoff | (United States) Raymond Floyd, (United States) Bobby Nichols |
| 5 | Feb 15, 1976 | Andy Williams-San Diego Open Invitational (2) | −16 (65-68-67-72=272) | 1 stroke | (United States) Don Bies |
| 6 | Sep 26, 1976 | Kaiser International Open Invitational | −14 (66-70-70-68=274) | 2 strokes | (United States) Gibby Gilbert, (United States) Johnny Miller |
| 7 | Oct 11, 1981 | Southern Open | −9 (67-68-70-66=271) | Playoff | (United States) Mike Sullivan |
| 8 | Jun 14, 1987 | Manufacturers Hanover Westchester Classic | −8 (71-70-65-70=276) | Playoff | (Spain) Seve Ballesteros |

PGA Tour playoff record (3–1)

| No. | Year | Tournament | Opponent(s) | Result |
|---|---|---|---|---|
| 1 | 1971 | Greater Hartford Open | (United States) George Archer, (United States) Lou Graham | Archer won with birdie on first extra hole |
| 2 | 1975 | Andy Williams-San Diego Open Invitational | (United States) Raymond Floyd, (United States) Bobby Nichols | Won with birdie on fourth extra hole Nichols eliminated by par on first hole |
| 3 | 1981 | Southern Open | (United States) Mike Sullivan | Won with par on second extra hole |
| 4 | 1987 | Manufacturers Hanover Westchester Classic | (Spain) Seve Ballesteros | Won with par on first extra hole |

=== PGA Tour of Australasia wins (1) ===
| No. | Date | Tournament | Winning score | Margin of victory | Runner-up |
|---|---|---|---|---|---|
| 1 | Oct 28, 1973 | Qantas Australian Open | −8 (70-70-69-71=280) | 2 strokes | (United States) Jerry Breaux |

=== Other wins (1) ===
| No. | Date | Tournament | Winning score | Margin of victory | Runner-up |
|---|---|---|---|---|---|
| 1 | Jul 29, 1980 | Jerry Ford Invitational | −5 (66-71=137) | Shared title with (United States) Hubert Green | |

=== Senior PGA Tour wins (4) ===
Legend
Senior PGA Tour major championships (1)
Other Senior PGA Tour (3)

| No. | Date | Tournament | Winning score | Margin of victory | Runner(s)-up |
|---|---|---|---|---|---|
| 1 | Mar 14, 1993 | Vantage at The Dominion | −2 (71-73-70=214) | 1 stroke | (United States) Bobby Nichols, (South Africa) Gary Player |
| 2 | Feb 5, 1995 | Royal Caribbean Classic | −4 (69-75-65=209) | Playoff | (United States) Raymond Floyd |
| 3 | Jul 16, 1995 | Ford Senior Players Championship | −16 (69-68-66-69=272) | Playoff | (United States) Jack Nicklaus |
| 4 | Jun 23, 2002 | Greater Baltimore Classic | −13 (69-64-70=203) | 1 stroke | (United States) John Mahaffey, (United States) Doug Tewell, (United States) Bobby Wadkins |

Senior PGA Tour playoff record (2–3)

| No. | Year | Tournament | Opponent(s) | Result |
|---|---|---|---|---|
| 1 | 1991 | Bank One Classic | (United States) DeWitt Weaver | Lost to birdie on second extra hole |
| 2 | 1992 | Kroger Senior Classic | (United States) Gibby Gilbert | Lost to par on second extra hole |
| 3 | 1995 | Royal Caribbean Classic | (United States) Raymond Floyd | Won with par on first extra hole |
| 4 | 1995 | Ford Senior Players Championship | (United States) Jack Nicklaus | Won with birdie on first extra hole |
| 5 | 2000 | LiquidGolf.com Invitational | (United States) Gary McCord, (United States) Tom Wargo | Wargo won with birdie on third extra hole Snead eliminated by par on first hole |

=== Other senior wins (2) ===
- 2011 Liberty Mutual Legends of Golf – Demaret Division (with Gibby Gilbert)
- 2012 Liberty Mutual Legends of Golf – Demaret Division (with Gibby Gilbert)

== Results in major championships ==
| Tournament | 1969 | 1970 | 1971 | 1972 | 1973 | 1974 | 1975 | 1976 | 1977 | 1978 | 1979 |
|---|---|---|---|---|---|---|---|---|---|---|---|
| Masters Tournament | | | | 30 | 2 | T26 | T10 | T43 | T39 | | 22 |
| U.S. Open | CUT | CUT | CUT | CUT | CUT | T21 | T49 | T14 | T27 | T2 | CUT |
| PGA Championship | | | CUT | T20 | T3 | T24 | T28 | T15 | T19 | | CUT |

| Tournament | 1980 | 1981 | 1982 | 1983 | 1984 | 1985 | 1986 | 1987 | 1988 |
|---|---|---|---|---|---|---|---|---|---|
| Masters Tournament | T14 | CUT | DQ | T12 | CUT | | | | CUT |
| U.S. Open | T22 | T33 | T15 | T43 | | | | | |
| PGA Championship | T50 | 15 | CUT | CUT | CUT | | 72 | CUT | |

Note: Snead never played in The Open Championship.

Top 10
Did not play

CUT = missed the half-way cut
DQ = disqualified
"T" indicates a tie for a place

=== Summary ===
| Tournament | Wins | 2nd | 3rd | Top-5 | Top-10 | Top-25 | Events | Cuts made |
|---|---|---|---|---|---|---|---|---|
| Masters Tournament | 0 | 1 | 0 | 1 | 2 | 5 | 13 | 9 |
| U.S. Open | 0 | 1 | 0 | 1 | 1 | 5 | 15 | 9 |
| The Open Championship | 0 | 0 | 0 | 0 | 0 | 0 | 0 | 0 |
| PGA Championship | 0 | 0 | 1 | 1 | 1 | 6 | 15 | 9 |
| Totals | 0 | 2 | 1 | 3 | 4 | 16 | 43 | 27 |

- Most consecutive cuts made – 14 (1973 PGA – 1979 Masters)
- Longest streak of top-10s – 1 (four times)

== Results in The Players Championship ==
| Tournament | 1974 | 1975 | 1976 | 1977 | 1978 | 1979 | 1980 | 1981 | 1982 | 1983 | 1984 | 1985 | 1986 | 1987 | 1988 | 1989 | 1990 |
|---|---|---|---|---|---|---|---|---|---|---|---|---|---|---|---|---|---|
| The Players Championship | 2 | T34 | 2 | T13 | T71 | CUT | T31 | WD | T13 | T32 | CUT | T17 | T67 | CUT | CUT | CUT | T46 |

Top 10

CUT = missed the halfway cut
WD = withdrew
"T" indicates a tie for a place

== Champions Tour major championships ==
=== Wins (1) ===
| Year | Championship | Winning score | Margin | Runner-up |
|---|---|---|---|---|
| 1995 | Ford Senior Players Championship | −16 (69-68-66-69=272) | Playoff^{1} | (United States) Jack Nicklaus |

^{1} Won with birdie on the first playoff hole.

== U.S. national team appearances ==
Professional

- Ryder Cup: 1971 (winners), 1973 (winners), 1975 (winners)
