= 1971 Ryder Cup =

Golf tournament in the United States

19th Ryder Cup Matches
- Dates: September 16–18, 1971
- Venue: Old Warson Country Club
- Location: St. Louis, Missouri
- Captains: Jay Hebert (USA); Eric Brown (Great Britain)
(United States)	18 1/2	13 1/2	(United Kingdom)
- United States wins the Ryder Cup

Location map
- Location within Missouri

The 19th Ryder Cup Matches were held September 16–18, 1971, in the United States at the Old Warson Country Club in St. Louis, Missouri. The U.S. team won the competition by a score of 18 1/2 to 13 1/2 points.

== Format ==
The Ryder Cup is a match play event, with each match worth one point. From 1963 through 1971 the competition format was as follows:

- Day 1 — 8 foursomes (alternate shot) matches, 4 each in morning and afternoon sessions
- Day 2 — 8 four-ball (better ball) matches, 4 each in morning and afternoon sessions
- Day 3 — 16 singles matches, 8 each in morning and afternoon sessions

With a total of 32 points, 16 1/2 points were required to win the Cup. All matches were played to a maximum of 18 holes.

== Teams ==
Team USA
Name	Age	Previous Ryder Cups	Matches	W–L–H	Winning percentage
Jay Hebert	48	Non-playing captain
Miller Barber	40	1	4	1–1–2	50.00
Frank Beard	32	1	4	1–2–1	37.50
Billy Casper	40	5	24	14–4–6	70.83
Charles Coody	34	0	Rookie
Gardner Dickinson	44	1	5	5–0–0	100.00
Gene Littler	41	5	21	9–4–8	61.90
Jack Nicklaus	31	1	4	1–2–1	37.50
Arnold Palmer	42	4	21	16–4–1	78.57
Mason Rudolph	37	0	Rookie
J. C. Snead	30	0	Rookie
Dave Stockton	29	0	Rookie
Lee Trevino	31	1	6	3–2–1	58.33

Six members of the Great Britain team were selected from a points list based on a player's best 10 performances in 15 events during the 1971 season, ending with the Benson & Hedges Festival of Golf on 21 August. The remaining six were chosen by a committee and announced on 23 August. The leading six in the points table were: Neil Coles, Peter Oosterhuis, Brian Barnes, Harry Bannerman, Peter Butler and Maurice Bembridge. The committee chose Brian Huggett, Peter Townsend and Bernard Gallacher who had finished 7th, 8th and 9th in the list, together with Tony Jacklin, Christy O'Connor Snr and John Garner. Jacklin had played most of his golf in America, while O'Connor had missed much of the season with a wrist injury. Garner was chosen over Tommy Horton who had had a good season in 1970 but had been less consistent than Garner in 1971.

Team Great Britain
Name	Age	Previous Ryder Cups	Matches	W–L–H	Winning percentage
(Scotland) Eric Brown	46	Non-playing captain
(Scotland) Harry Bannerman	29	0	Rookie
(Scotland) Brian Barnes	26	1	3	0–3–0	0.00
(England) Maurice Bembridge	26	1	5	2–2–1	50.00
(England) Peter Butler	39	2	9	2–5–2	33.33
(England) Neil Coles	36	5	27	10–13–4	44.44
(Scotland) Bernard Gallacher	22	1	4	2–2–0	50.00
(England) John Garner	24	0	Rookie
(Wales) Brian Huggett	34	3	15	4–7–4	40.00
(England) Tony Jacklin	27	2	12	6–3–3	62.50
(Republic of Ireland) Christy O'Connor Snr	46	8	27	9–16–2	37.04
(England) Peter Oosterhuis	23	0	Rookie
(England) Peter Townsend	25	1	5	3–2–0	60.00

== Thursday's matches ==
=== Morning foursomes ===
	Results
Coles/O'Connor	(United Kingdom) 2 & 1	Casper/Barber
Townsend/Oosterhuis	(United States) 2 up	Palmer/Dickinson
Huggett/Jacklin	(United Kingdom) 3 & 2	Nicklaus/Stockton
Bembridge/Butler	(United Kingdom) 1 up	Coody/Beard
3	Session	1
3	Overall	1

=== Afternoon foursomes ===
	Results
Bannerman/Gallacher	(United Kingdom) 2 & 1	Casper/Barber
Townsend/Oosterhuis	(United States) 1 up	Palmer/Dickinson
Huggett/Jacklin	halved	Trevino/Rudolph
Bembridge/Butler	(United States) 5 & 3	Nicklaus/Snead
1 1/2	Session	2 1/2
4 1/2	Overall	3 1/2

== Friday's matches ==
=== Morning four-ball ===
	Results
O'Connor/Barnes	(United States) 2 & 1	Trevino/Rudolph
Coles/Garner	(United States) 2 & 1	Beard/Snead
Oosterhuis/Gallacher	(United States) 5 & 4	Palmer/Dickinson
Townsend/Bannerman	(United States) 2 & 1	Nicklaus/Littler
0	Session	4
4 1/2	Overall	7 1/2

=== Afternoon four-ball ===
	Results
Gallacher/Oosterhuis	(United Kingdom) 1 up	Trevino/Casper
Jacklin/Huggett	(United States) 2 & 1	Littler/Snead
Townsend/Bannerman	(United States) 1 up	Palmer/Nicklaus
Coles/O'Connor	halved	Coody/Beard
1 1/2	Session	2 1/2
6	Overall	10

== Saturday's matches ==
=== Morning singles ===
	Results
Tony Jacklin	(United States) 1 up	Lee Trevino
Bernard Gallacher	halved	Dave Stockton
Brian Barnes	(United Kingdom) 1 up	Mason Rudolph
Peter Oosterhuis	(United Kingdom) 4 & 3	Gene Littler
Peter Townsend	(United States) 3 & 2	Jack Nicklaus
Christy O'Connor	(United States) 5 & 4	Gardner Dickinson
Harry Bannerman	halved	Arnold Palmer
Neil Coles	halved	Frank Beard
3 1/2	Session	4 1/2
9 1/2	Overall	14 1/2

=== Afternoon singles ===
	Results
Brian Huggett	(United States) 7 & 6	Lee Trevino
Tony Jacklin	(United States) 1 up	J. C. Snead
Brian Barnes	(United Kingdom) 2 & 1	Miller Barber
Peter Townsend	(United States) 1 up	Dave Stockton
Bernard Gallacher	(United Kingdom) 2 & 1	Charles Coody
Neil Coles	(United States) 5 & 3	Jack Nicklaus
Peter Oosterhuis	(United Kingdom) 3 & 2	Arnold Palmer
Harry Bannerman	(United Kingdom) 2 & 1	Gardner Dickinson
4	Session	4
13 1/2	Overall	18 1/2

== Individual player records ==
Each entry refers to the win–loss–half record of the player.

=== United States ===
Player	Points	Overall	Singles	Foursomes	Fourballs
Miller Barber	0	0–3–0	0–1–0	0–2–0	0–0–0
Frank Beard	2	1–1–2	0–0–1	0–1–0	1–0–1
Billy Casper	0	0–3–0	0–0–0	0–2–0	0–1–0
Charles Coody	0.5	0–2–1	0–1–0	0–1–0	0–0–1
Gardner Dickinson	4	4–1–0	1–1–0	2–0–0	1–0–0
Gene Littler	2	2–1–0	0–1–0	0–0–0	2–0–0
Jack Nicklaus	5	5–1–0	2–0–0	1–1–0	2–0–0
Arnold Palmer	4.5	4–1–1	0–1–1	2–0–0	2–0–0
Mason Rudolph	1.5	1–1–1	0–1–0	0–0–1	1–0–0
J. C. Snead	4	4–0–0	1–0–0	1–0–0	2–0–0
Dave Stockton	1.5	1–1–1	1–0–1	0–1–0	0–0–0
Lee Trevino	3.5	3–1–1	2–0–0	0–0–1	1–1–0

=== Great Britain ===
Player	Points	Overall	Singles	Foursomes	Fourballs
Harry Bannerman	2.5	2–2–1	1–0–1	1–0–0	0–2–0
Brian Barnes	2	2–1–0	2–0–0	0–0–0	0–1–0
Maurice Bembridge	1	1–1–0	0–0–0	1–1–0	0–0–0
Peter Butler	1	1–1–0	0–0–0	1–1–0	0–0–0
Neil Coles	2	1–2–2	0–1–1	1–0–0	0–1–1
Bernard Gallacher	3.5	3–1–1	1–0–1	1–0–0	1–1–0
John Garner	0	0–1–0	0–0–0	0–0–0	0–1–0
Brian Huggett	1.5	1–2–1	0–1–0	1–0–1	0–1–0
Tony Jacklin	1.5	1–3–1	0–2–0	1–0–1	0–1–0
Christy O'Connor	1.5	1–2–1	0–1–0	1–0–0	0–1–1
Peter Oosterhuis	3	3–3–0	2–0–0	0–2–0	1–1–0
Peter Townsend	0	0–6–0	0–2–0	0–2–0	0–2–0
