= 1978 Masters Tournament =

- Front cover of the 1978 Masters Guide

Tournament information
- Dates: April 6–9, 1978
- Location: Augusta, Georgia; 33.503°N 82.020°W
- Course: Augusta National Golf Club
- Organized by: Augusta National Golf Club
- Tour: PGA Tour

Statistics
- Par: 72
- Length: 7,040 yards (6,437 m)
- Field: 78 players, 53 after cut
- Cut: 149 (+5)
- Winner's share: $45,000

Champion
- (South Africa) Gary Player
- 277 (−11)
- Location in the United States Location in Georgia

The 1978 Masters Tournament was the 42nd Masters Tournament, held April 6–9 at Augusta National Golf Club in Augusta, Georgia. Gary Player overcame a 7-shot deficit going into the final round to win his third Masters and ninth major championship. Player, age 42, shot a record-tying 64 (−8) in the final round to win by one stroke. The runners-up were Rod Funseth, defending champion Tom Watson, and 54-hole leader Hubert Green, the reigning U.S. Open champion, who shot an even-par 72.

Tied for tenth place at the start of the round, Player shot a 30 on the back nine in the summer-like heat. He holed seven putts ranging from 10 to 30 feet (3 to 9 m), including a final one of 15 feet (4.6 m) for birdie at 18. The leader in the clubhouse, Player had to wait forty minutes for the final groups to finish. Funseth had five birdies, but his two bogeys were both three-putts and he parred the last three holes. Watson eagled 13 and birdied both 15 and 16, but missed an 8-foot (2.4 m) putt for par on the final hole. After a bogey at 16, Green hit an outstanding approach shot at 18 which left a birdie putt from three feet (0.9 m) to tie, but he missed after being inadvertently distracted by a radio announcer.

Player became the oldest winner of the Masters and the first over forty in nearly a quarter century; Sam Snead won his third green jacket at age 41 in 1954. Player retained the honor for eight years, until Jack Nicklaus won his sixth at 46 in 1986.

== Field ==
1. Masters champions

Tommy Aaron, George Archer (8), Gay Brewer, Billy Casper (8), Charles Coody (10), Raymond Floyd (8,11,12), Doug Ford, Bob Goalby, Jack Nicklaus (4,8,9,10,11,12), Arnold Palmer (8), Gary Player (3,8,9), Sam Snead, Art Wall Jr., Tom Watson (3,8,9,10,11,12)

- Jack Burke Jr., Jimmy Demaret, Ralph Guldahl, Claude Harmon, Ben Hogan, Herman Keiser, Cary Middlecoff, Byron Nelson, Henry Picard, and Gene Sarazen did not play.

The following categories only apply to Americans

2. U.S. Open champions (last five years)

Lou Graham (8,9,10,12), Hubert Green (8,9,11,12), Hale Irwin (8,11,12), Johnny Miller (3), Jerry Pate (8,10,11)

3. The Open champions (last five years)

Tom Weiskopf (8,9,11)

4. PGA champions (last five years)

Dave Stockton (12), Lee Trevino (11), Lanny Wadkins (10,11,12)

5. 1977 U.S. Amateur semi-finalists

Doug Fischesser (a), Ralph Landrum (a), Jay Sigel (7,a)

- John Fought (6,7) forfeited his exemption by turning professional.

6. Previous two U.S. Amateur and Amateur champions

Dick Siderowf (7,a)

- Bill Sander (7) forfeited his exemption by turning professional.

7. Members of the 1977 U.S. Walker Cup team

Mike Brannan (a), Gary Hallberg (a), Vance Heafner (a), Lindy Miller (a), Fred Ridley (a)

- Scott Simpson forfeited his exemption by turning professional.

8. Top 24 players and ties from the 1977 Masters Tournament

Andy Bean, Jim Colbert, Ben Crenshaw (11), Danny Edwards, Lee Elder, Rod Funseth (9), Don January (10,12), Tom Kite, Billy Kratzert (11), Gene Littler (10,11), Rik Massengale, Andy North (11), John Schlee, Bob Wynn

9. Top 16 players and ties from the 1977 U.S. Open

Wally Armstrong, Terry Diehl, Al Geiberger (10,11), Jay Haas (11), Joe Inman, Gary Jacobson, Lyn Lott, Mike McCullough, Steve Melnyk, Tom Purtzer

10. Top eight players and ties from 1977 PGA Championship

Jerry McGee (11,12)

11. Winners of PGA Tour events since the previous Masters

Miller Barber, Dave Eichelberger, Mike Hill, Mac McLendon, Gil Morgan, Mike Morley, Bill Rogers, Jim Simons, Ed Sneed (12), Leonard Thompson

12. Members of the U.S. 1977 Ryder Cup team

Dave Hill

13. Foreign invitations

Isao Aoki, Seve Ballesteros (11), Bobby Cole (11), Antonio Garrido, David Graham (8), Peter McEvoy (6,a), Tsuneyuki Nakajima, Peter Oosterhuis (9), Masashi Ozaki, Manuel Piñero

- Numbers in brackets indicate categories that the player would have qualified under had they been American.

== Round summaries ==
=== First round ===
Thursday, April 6, 1978

Place	Player	Score	To par
1	(United States) John Schlee	68	−4
2	(United States) Joe Inman	69	−3
T3	(United States) Billy Kratzert	70	−2
T3	(United States) Lee Trevino	70	−2
T5	(United States) Tom Kite	71	−1
T5	(United States) Jerry McGee	71	−1
T5	(United States) Steve Melnyk	71	−1
T8	(United States) Wally Armstrong	72	E
T8	(United States) Hubert Green	72	E
T8	(United States) Dave Hill	72	E
T8	(United States) Don January	72	E
T8	(United States) Gene Littler	72	E
T8	(United States) Lyn Lott	72	E
T8	(United States) Mac McLendon	72	E
T8	(United States) Jack Nicklaus	72	E
T8	(United States) Jerry Pate	72	E
T8	(South Africa) Gary Player	72	E
T8	(United States) Leonard Thompson	72	E
T8	(United States) Tom Weiskopf	72	E

=== Second round ===
Friday, April 7, 1978

Place	Player	Score	To par
T1	(United States) Rod Funseth	73-66=139	−5
T1	(United States) Lee Trevino	70-69=139	−5
T3	(United States) Hale Irwin	73-67=140	−4
T3	(United States) Gene Littler	72-68=140	−4
T5	(United States) Hubert Green	72-69=141	−3
T5	(United States) Leonard Thompson	72-69=141	−3
T5	(United States) Tom Watson	73-68=141	−3
T8	(United States) Wally Armstrong	72-70=142	−2
T8	(United States) Miller Barber	75-67=142	−2
T8	(United States) Joe Inman	69-73=142	−2
T8	(United States) Don January	72-70=142	−2
T8	(United States) Arnold Palmer	73-69=142	−2

=== Third round ===
Saturday, April 8, 1978

Place	Player	Score	To par
1	(United States) Hubert Green	72-69-65=206	−10
T2	(United States) Rod Funseth	73-66-70=209	−7
T2	(United States) Tom Watson	73-68-68=209	−7
4	(United States) Gene Littler	72-68-70=210	−6
T5	(Australia) David Graham	75-69-67=211	−5
T5	(United States) Hale Irwin	73-67-71=211	−5
T5	(United States) Billy Kratzert	70-74-67=211	−5
T5	(United States) Lee Trevino	70-69-72=211	−5
9	(United States) Wally Armstrong	72-70-70=212	−4
T10	(Spain) Seve Ballesteros	74-71-68=213	−3
T10	(United States) Gay Brewer	73-71-69=213	−3
T10	(South Africa) Gary Player	72-72-69=213	−3
T10	(United States) Tom Weiskopf	72-71-70=213	−3

=== Final round ===
Sunday, April 9, 1978

==== Final leaderboard ====
Champion
Silver Cup winner (low amateur)
(a) = amateur
(c) = past champion

Top 10
Place	Player	Score	To par	Money (US$)
1	(South Africa) Gary Player (c)	72-72-69-64=277	−11	45,000
T2	(United States) Rod Funseth	73-66-70-69=278	−10	21,667
T2	(United States) Hubert Green	72-69-65-72=278	−10	21,667
T2	(United States) Tom Watson (c)	73-68-68-69=278	−10	21,667
T5	(United States) Wally Armstrong	72-70-70-68=280	−8	11,750
T5	(United States) Billy Kratzert	70-74-67-69=280	−8	11,750
7	(United States) Jack Nicklaus (c)	72-73-69-67=281	−7	10,000
8	(United States) Hale Irwin	73-67-71-71=282	−6	8,500
T9	(Australia) David Graham	75-69-67-72=283	−5	6,750
T9	(United States) Joe Inman	69-73-72-69=283	−5	6,750

Leaderboard below the top 10
Place	Player	Score	To par	Money ($)
T11	(United States) Don January	72-70-72-70=284	−4	4,417
T11	(United States) Jerry McGee	71-73-71-69=284	−4	4,417
T11	(United States) Tom Weiskopf	72-71-70-71=284	−4	4,417
T14	(England) Peter Oosterhuis	74-70-70-71=285	−3	3,300
T14	(United States) Lee Trevino	70-69-72-74=285	−3	3,300
T16	(United States) Raymond Floyd (c)	76-71-71-68=286	−2	2,950
T16	(United States) Lindy Miller (a)	74-71-70-71=286	−2	0
T18	(Spain) Seve Ballesteros	74-71-68-74=287	−1	2,550
T18	(United States) Tom Kite	71-74-71-71=287	−1	2,550
T18	(United States) Gil Morgan	73-73-70-71=287	−1	2,550
T18	(United States) Jerry Pate	72-71-72-72=287	−1	2,550
T18	(United States) Ed Sneed	74-70-70-73=287	−1	2,550
T18	(United States) Lanny Wadkins	74-70-73-70=287	−1	2,550
T24	(United States) Miller Barber	75-67-73-73=288	E	2,200
T24	(United States) Andy Bean	76-68-73-71=288	E	2,200
T24	(United States) Gene Littler	72-68-70-78=288	E	2,200
T24	(United States) Leonard Thompson	72-69-75-72=288	E	2,200
28	(South Africa) Bobby Cole	77-70-70-72=289	+1	2,000
T29	(United States) Gay Brewer (c)	73-71-69-77=290	+2	1,975
T29	(United States) Mac McLendon	72-72-72-74=290	+2	1,975
T29	(United States) Bill Rogers	76-70-68-76=290	+2	1,975
T32	(United States) Jim Colbert	74-73-75-69=291	+3	1,950
T32	(United States) Terry Diehl	74-72-74-71=291	+3	1,950
T32	(United States) Johnny Miller	77-72-72-70=291	+3	1,950
T32	(United States) Andy North	73-76-72-70=291	+3	1,950
36	(United States) Tommy Aaron (c)	73-74-71-74=292	+4	1,925
T37	(United States) Ben Crenshaw	75-70-74-74=293	+5	1,900
T37	(United States) Mike Hill	73-75-74-71=293	+5	1,900
T37	(United States) Arnold Palmer (c)	73-69-74-77=293	+5	1,900
T37	(United States) Tom Purtzer	78-69-74-72=293	+5	1,900
41	(United States) Lyn Lott	72-76-71-75=294	+6	1,875
T42	(United States) Lee Elder	73-75-74-73=295	+7	1,850
T42	(United States) Al Geiberger	75-73-75-72=295	+7	1,850
T42	(United States) John Schlee	68-75-77-75=295	+7	1,850
T45	(United States) Vance Heafner (a)	73-74-74-75=296	+8	0
T45	(United States) Dave Hill	72-76-74-74=296	+8	1,825
T47	(United States) Jay Haas	74-73-74-76=297	+9	1,800
T47	(United States) Gary Hallberg (a)	73-73-78-73=297	+9	0
49	(United States) Dick Siderowf (a)	77-72-78-71=298	+10	0
50	(United States) Bob Wynn	74-70-78-77=299	+11	1,750
51	(United States) Steve Melnyk	71-78-75-76=300	+12	1,725
52	(United States) Bob Goalby (c)	73-75-78-75=301	+13	1,700
53	(England) Peter McEvoy (a)	73-75-77-77=302	+14	0
CUT	(United States) Charles Coody (c)	75-75=150	+6	
CUT	(United States) Dave Eichelberger	79-71=150	+6	
CUT	(United States) Lou Graham	75-75=150	+6	
CUT	(Japan) Masashi Ozaki	76-74=150	+6	
CUT	(Spain) Manuel Piñero	78-72=150	+6	
CUT	(United States) Billy Casper (c)	76-75=151	+7	
CUT	(United States) Mike Morley	78-73=151	+7	
CUT	(United States) Dave Stockton	76-75=151	+7	
CUT	(Japan) Isao Aoki	79-73=152	+8	
CUT	(United States) Art Wall Jr. (c)	74-78=152	+8	
CUT	(United States) Gary Jacobson	79-74=153	+9	
CUT	(United States) Jay Sigel (a)	76-77=153	+9	
CUT	(United States) Doug Ford (c)	78-76=154	+10	
CUT	(United States) Sam Snead (c)	79-75=154	+10	
CUT	(Spain) Antonio Garrido	77-78=155	+11	
CUT	(United States) Ralph Landrum (a)	79-77=156	+12	
CUT	(United States) Rik Massengale	81-75=156	+12	
CUT	(United States) Jim Simons	79-77=156	+12	
CUT	(United States) Danny Edwards	79-79=158	+14	
CUT	(Japan) Tsuneyuki Nakajima	80-80=160	+16	
CUT	(United States) Mike Brannan (a)	80-82=162	+18	
CUT	(United States) Doug Fischesser (a)	81-84=165	+21	
CUT	(United States) Fred Ridley (a)	84-81=165	+21	
WD	(United States) George Archer (c)	81	+9	
WD	(United States) Mike McCullough	82	+10	

==== Scorecard ====
Hole	1	2	3	4	5	6	7	8	9	10	11	12	13	14	15	16	17	18
Par	4	5	4	3	4	3	4	5	4	4	4	3	5	4	5	3	4	4
(South Africa) Player	−3	−4	−4	−5	−5	−5	−4	−4	−5	−6	−6	−7	−8	−8	−9	−10	−10	−11
(United States) Funseth	−7	−8	−8	−8	−7	−7	−7	−8	−8	−9	−9	−9	−10	−9	−10	−10	−10	−10
(United States) Green	−9	−10	−10	−10	−9	−9	−9	−10	−10	−10	−9	−9	−10	−10	−11	−10	−10	−10
(United States) Watson	−7	−8	−8	−8	−8	−8	−8	−8	−8	−8	−8	−8	−10	−9	−10	−11	−11	−10

Cumulative tournament scores, relative to par

Eagle	Birdie	Bogey
