= 1976 U.S. Open (golf) =

Tournament information
- Dates: June 17–20, 1976
- Location: Duluth, Georgia; 34.004°N 84.193°W
- Courses: Atlanta Athletic Club, Highlands Course
- Organized by: USGA
- Tour: PGA Tour

Statistics
- Par: 70
- Length: 7,015 yards (6,415 m)
- Field: 150 players, 66 after cut
- Cut: 151 (+11)
- Prize fund: $253,000
- Winner's share: $42,000

Champion
- (United States) Jerry Pate
- 277 (−3)

Location map
- Location in the United States Location in Georgia

The 1976 U.S. Open was the 76th U.S. Open, held June 17–20 at the Highlands Course of the Atlanta Athletic Club in Duluth, Georgia, a suburb northeast of Atlanta. Tour rookie Jerry Pate won his only major championship, two strokes ahead of runners-up Al Geiberger and Tom Weiskopf.

John Mahaffey, who lost the U.S. Open in a playoff the year before, took the lead with a 68 in the second round. He followed that up with a 69 in the third round on Saturday for a two-stroke lead over Jerry Pate after 54 holes, with Geiberger three back and Weiskopf four back. The gap was still two strokes after fourteen holes, but Pate hit a one-iron close and birdied the par-3 15th; and when Mahaffey bogeyed 16, the two were tied. Mahaffey three-putted for bogey on 17 and Pate took a one-stroke lead as Mahaffey fell into a tie for second with Geiberger and Weiskopf, both in the clubhouse with 279.

Both Mahaffey and Pate found the rough off the 18th tee. Mahaffey, behind by a shot and trying for birdie, hit his approach shot into the water fronting the green and made bogey, and fell into a tie for fourth. Having a better lie in the rough, Pate gambled that he could clear the water and then hit one of the most memorable shots in U.S. Open history. His 5-iron approach from 191 yards (175 m) flew directly on to the green and stopped three feet (0.9 m) from the hole, and he made the birdie putt for a two-stroke victory.

The U.S. Amateur champion two years earlier in 1974, Pate was only 22 in 1976 and appeared to have a bright future ahead of him, but shoulder injuries significantly shortened his career. He won seven more PGA Tour tournaments, the last in 1982, and finished runner-up in two additional majors in the late 1970s.

Future champion Fuzzy Zoeller made his major championship debut at this U.S. Open and finished in 38th place. Mike Reid, a 21-year-old amateur, led by three shots after the first round, but a second-round 81 dashed any hope of an amateur champion. He shared low-amateur honors with John Fought at 300 (+20).

Jack Nicklaus finished tied for eleventh and saw his streak of 13 consecutive top-10s in majors come to an end. He began a new streak and finished in the top-10 in the next nine majors. Only Harry Vardon made more consecutive major top-10s when he made sixteen in a row – fifteen Open Championships (1894–1908) and the U.S. Open in 1900.

This was the first of four majors held at the Highlands Course; it hosted the PGA Championship in 1981, 2001, and 2011.

This was the first year that players were allowed to have their own caddies at the U.S. Open. The other majors and some PGA Tour events had traditionally disallowed players from using their own caddies. The Masters required club caddies from Augusta National through 1982.

== Course layout ==
Atlanta Athletic Club, Highlands Course

Hole	1	2	3	4	5	6	7	8	9	Out	10	11	12	13	14	15	16	17	18	In	Total
Yards	455	450	460	205	540	440	175	420	415	3,560	370	480	510	390	415	215	410	205	460	3,455	7,015
Par	4	4	4	3	5	4	3	4	4	35	4	4	5	4	4	3	4	3	4	35	70

== Round summaries ==
=== First round ===
Thursday, June 17, 1976

Amateur Mike Reid, age 21, grabbed the first round lead with a three-under 67, while the rest of the field posted no better than par. Several professionals voiced their concerns over the playing conditions of the course.

Place	Player	Score	To par
1	(United States) Mike Reid (a)	67	−3
T2	(United States) Raymond Floyd	70	E
T2	(United States) Rod Funseth	70	E
T2	(United States) Al Geiberger	70	E
T2	(United States) John Mahaffey	70	E
T2	(United States) Rik Massengale	70	E
T7	(United States) Butch Baird	71	+1
T7	(United States) Terry Diehl	71	+1
T7	(United States) Don January	71	+1
T7	(United States) Lyn Lott	71	+1
T7	(United States) Mike Morley	71	+1
T7	(United States) Jerry Pate	71	+1

=== Second round ===
Friday, June 18, 1976

John Mahaffey shot a 68 and grabbed the lead, while amateur Reid fell into a tie for 32nd place with an 81.

Place	Player	Score	To par
1	(United States) John Mahaffey	70-68=138	−2
2	(United States) Al Geiberger	70-69=139	−1
T3	(United States) Ben Crenshaw	72-68=140	E
T3	(United States) Rod Funseth	70-70=140	E
T3	(United States) Jerry Pate	71-69=140	E
T6	(United States) Butch Baird	71-71=142	+2
T6	(United States) Hubert Green	72-70=142	+2
T6	(United States) Lyn Lott	71-71=142	+2
T6	(United States) Mike Morley	71-71=142	+2
T6	(United States) J. C. Snead	73-69=142	+2

=== Third round ===
Saturday, June 19, 1976

Mahaffey kept the lead with a 69, two strokes ahead of Pate, with Al Geiberger and Tom Weiskopf in third and fourth place. After nine holes, Mahaffey opened up a six-stroke lead but struggled on the back nine and, with Pate making a remarkable eagle on 12, the lead was cut to two when the day ended.

Place	Player	Score	To par
1	(United States) John Mahaffey	70-68-69=207	−3
2	(United States) Jerry Pate	71-69-69=209	−1
3	(United States) Al Geiberger	70-69-71=210	E
4	(United States) Tom Weiskopf	73-70-68=211	+1
T5	(United States) Ben Crenshaw	72-68-72=212	+2
T5	(United States) Rod Funseth	70-70-72=212	+2
T5	(United States) Lyn Lott	71-71-70=212	+2
T5	(United States) Mike Morley	71-71-70=212	+2
T9	(United States) Butch Baird	71-71-71=213	+3
T9	(United States) Hubert Green	72-70-71=213	+3
T9	(United States) J. C. Snead	73-69-71=213	+3

=== Final round ===
Sunday, June 20, 1976

Place	Player	Score	To par	Money ($)
1	(United States) Jerry Pate	71-69-69-68=277	−3	42,000
T2	(United States) Al Geiberger	70-69-71-69=279	−1	18,000
T2	(United States) Tom Weiskopf	73-70-68-68=279	−1	18,000
T4	(United States) Butch Baird	71-71-71-67=280	E	11,250
T4	(United States) John Mahaffey	70-68-69-73=280	E	11,250
6	(United States) Hubert Green	72-70-71-69=282	+2	9,500
7	(United States) Tom Watson	74-72-68-70=284	+4	8,500
T8	(United States) Ben Crenshaw	72-68-72-73=285	+5	7,000
T8	(United States) Lyn Lott	71-71-70-73=285	+5	7,000
10	(United States) Johnny Miller	74-72-69-71=286	+6	5,500

==== Scorecard ====
Hole	1	2	3	4	5	6	7	8	9	10	11	12	13	14	15	16	17	18
Par	4	4	4	3	5	4	3	4	4	4	4	5	4	4	3	4	3	4
(United States) Pate	−1	−1	−2	−2	−2	−2	−2	−2	−2	−2	−2	−2	−2	−1	−2	−2	−2	−3
(United States) Geiberger	E	+1	+1	+2	+2	+2	+2	+2	+2	+2	+2	+1	+1	+1	E	E	−1	−1
(United States) Weiskopf	+1	+1	+1	+1	+1	+1	+1	E	+1	+1	+1	E	−1	−2	−1	−1	−1	−1
(United States) Mahaffey	−3	−3	−3	−3	−3	−3	−3	−4	−3	−3	−3	−3	−3	−3	−3	−2	−1	E

Cumulative tournament scores, relative to par

Birdie	Bogey
