= List of Florida State Seminoles men's golfers =

This List of Florida State Seminoles men's golfers includes notable athletes who played for the Florida State Seminoles men's golf team that represents Florida State University in Tallahassee, Florida, and who play or have played golf professionally. These Florida State University alumni played on the PGA Tour and/or on the affiliated Korn Ferry Tour or Champions Tour. The table lists their wins on these tours and other notable golfing achievements.

| Name | PGA wins (Majors) | European Tour wins | Korn Ferry Tour wins | Champions wins | Notes |
|---|---|---|---|---|---|
| Cole Anderson | - | - | – | – | Won 2026 Peru Open |
| Paul Azinger | 12 (1) | 3 | – | – | |
| Daniel Berger | 4 | – | – | – | Earned Team USA's clinching point at the 2017 Presidents Cup |
| Jonas Blixt | 3 | – | – | – | Blixt's win at the 2017 Zurich Classic of New Orleans was a team event with Cameron Smith. |
| Dan Bradbury | - | 3 | – | – | Bradbury won the 2022 Joburg Open as a sponsor's invite, earning his way onto the DP World Tour. |
| Luke Clanton | - | - | – | – | As an amateur, had back-to-back top-10 finishes on the PGA Tour, including runner up at the 2024 John Deere Classic. |
| Cristóbal del Solar | – | – | 1 | – | Won four events on the PGA Tour Latinoamérica. |
| Bob Duval | – | – | - | 1 | |
| Harry Ellis | – | – | – | – | One of three players to win both the English Amateur and The Amateur Championship. |
| Downing Gray | – | – | – | – | Twice finished as low amateur at the Masters Tournament |
| Hubert Green | 19 (2) | 3 | - | 4 | |
| Björn Hellgren | - | – | - | – | Won the 2025 Saudi Open. Won three times on the Swedish Golf Tour and four times on the Nordic Golf League |
| Nolan Henke | 3 | – | – | – | |
| Brian Kamm | – | - | 1 | – | |
| Richie Karl | 1 | – | – | – | Karl was a 2-time winner of the Alaska State Amateur, and 4-time winner of the Iowa PGA Championship. |
| Stephen Keppler | – | – | – | – | Inducted in 2014 into the Georgia Golf Hall of Fame. |
| Drew Kittleson | – | – | – | – | Kittleson advanced to the finals of the 2008 U.S. Amateur at Pinehurst before falling to Danny Lee, 5 & 4. |
| Frederik Kjettrup | – | – | – | – | Won his first two starts on the PGA Tour Americas and 3-times total. Won once on the Challenge Tour. |
| Kenny Knox | 3 | – | – | – | |
| Brooks Koepka | 9 (5) | 6 | – | – | Back to back wins in U.S. Open (2017, 2018) and PGA Championship (2018, 2019). Moved to No. 1 in the Official World Golf Ranking in October 2018. He has two wins on the Japan Golf Tour. Prior to joining the PGA Tour, Koepka won four tournaments on the Challenge Tour and one tournament on the European Tour. |
| Hank Lebioda | – | – | 1 | – | Won one event on the PGA Tour Canada |
| Jack Maguire | – | – | – | – | |
| George McNeill | 2 | – | – | – | |
| Vincent Norrman | 1 | 1 | – | – | |
| John Pak | – | – | 1 | – | Won one event on the PGA Tour Canada. Low amateur at the 2020 U.S. Open. |
| Jeremy Robinson | – | – | – | – | Won five times on the Challenge Tour. |
| Chase Seiffert | – | – | – | – | Won the 2012 Florida Open as an amateur. |
| Bob Shave | – | – | – | – | Won the Pennsylvania Open Championship, and was a 3-time winner of the Ohio Open. |
| Jeff Sluman | 6 (1) | – | - | 6 | Other wins include the 1978 New York State Amateur, two wins at the CVS Health Charity Classic, and two wins at the Franklin Templeton Shootout. |
| Ken Staton | – | – | – | – | Won six events on the PGA Tour Canada. |
| Jack Whaley | - | – | - | - | Won 2026 U.S. Amateur. |
