= 1974 PGA Tour =

Golf tour season

1974 PGA Tour season
- Duration: January 3, 1974 – November 3, 1974
- Number of official events: 44
- Most wins: (United States) Johnny Miller (8)
- Money list: (United States) Johnny Miller
- PGA Player of the Year: (United States) Johnny Miller

The 1974 PGA Tour was the 59th season of the PGA Tour, the main professional golf tour in the United States. It was also the sixth season since separating from the PGA of America.

== Schedule ==
The following table lists official events during the 1974 season.

Date	Tournament	Location	Purse (US$)	Winner(s) (Note: The number in parentheses after each winner's name is the number of PGA Tour events they had won up to and including that tournament. This information is only shown for PGA Tour members.)	Notes
Jan 6	Bing Crosby National Pro-Am	California	138,750	(United States) Johnny Miller (4)	Pro-Am
Jan 13	Phoenix Open	Arizona	150,000	(United States) Johnny Miller (5)	
Jan 20	Dean Martin Tucson Open	Arizona	150,000	(United States) Johnny Miller (6)	
Jan 27	Andy Williams-San Diego Open Invitational	California	170,000	(United States) Bobby Nichols (11)	
Feb 3	Hawaiian Open	Hawaii	220,000	(United States) Jack Nicklaus (53)	
Feb 10	Bob Hope Desert Classic	California	160,000	(United States) Hubert Green (4)	Pro-Am
Feb 17	Glen Campbell-Los Angeles Open	California	150,000	(United States) Dave Stockton (7)	
Feb 24	Jackie Gleason-Inverrary Classic	Florida	260,000	(United States) Leonard Thompson (1)	
Mar 3	Florida Citrus Open	Florida	150,000	(United States) Jerry Heard (4)	
Mar 10	Doral-Eastern Open	Florida	150,000	(United States) Buddy Allin (3)	
Mar 17	Greater Jacksonville Open	Florida	150,000	(United States) Hubert Green (5)	
Mar 24	Sea Pines Heritage Classic	South Carolina	200,000	(United States) Johnny Miller (7)	Invitational
Mar 31	Greater New Orleans Open	Louisiana	150,000	(United States) Lee Trevino (18)	
Apr 7	Greater Greensboro Open	North Carolina	220,000	(New Zealand) Bob Charles (6)	
Apr 14	Masters Tournament	Georgia	229,549	(South Africa) Gary Player (19)	Major championship
Apr 14	Magnolia Classic	Mississippi	17,500	(United States) Dwight Nevil (n/a)	Second Tour (Note: Official money; unofficial win.)
Apr 21	Monsanto Open	Florida	150,000	(United States) Lee Elder (1)	
Apr 28	Tournament of Champions	California	200,000	(United States) Johnny Miller (8)	Winners-only event
Apr 28	Tallahassee Open	Florida	90,000	(United States) Allen Miller (1)	Alternate event
May 5	Byron Nelson Golf Classic	Texas	150,000	(United States) Buddy Allin (4)	
May 12	Houston Open	Texas	150,000	(United States) Dave Hill (11)	
May 19	Colonial National Invitation	Texas	250,000	(United States) Rod Curl (1)	Invitational
May 26	Danny Thomas Memphis Classic	Tennessee	175,000	(South Africa) Gary Player (20)	
Jun 2	Kemper Open	North Carolina	250,000	(United States) Bob Menne (1)	
Jun 9	IVB-Philadelphia Golf Classic	Pennsylvania	150,000	(United States) Hubert Green (6)	
Jun 16	U.S. Open	New York	219,900	(United States) Hale Irwin (3)	Major championship
Jun 23	American Golf Classic	Ohio	170,000	(United States) Jim Colbert (4)	
Jun 30	Western Open	Illinois	200,000	(United States) Tom Watson (1)	
Jul 6	Greater Milwaukee Open	Wisconsin	130,000	(United States) Ed Sneed (2)	
Jul 13	The Open Championship	Scotland	£50,000	(South Africa) Gary Player (21)	Major championship (Note: Unofficial money event at the time, but retrospectively counted as an official win.)
Jul 14	Quad Cities Open	Iowa	100,000	(United States) Dave Stockton (8)	Alternate event
Jul 21	B.C. Open	New York	150,000	(United States) Richie Karl (1)	
Jul 28	Canadian Open	Canada	200,000	(United States) Bobby Nichols (12)	
Aug 4	Pleasant Valley Classic	Massachusetts	200,000	(Mexico) Victor Regalado (1)	
Aug 11	PGA Championship	North Carolina	225,000	(United States) Lee Trevino (19)	Major championship
Aug 18	Sammy Davis Jr.-Greater Hartford Open	Connecticut	200,000	(United States) Dave Stockton (9)	
Aug 25	Westchester Classic	New York	250,000	(United States) Johnny Miller (9)	
Sep 2	Tournament Players Championship	Georgia	250,000	(United States) Jack Nicklaus (54)	New tournament Special event
Sep 8	Southern Open	Georgia	100,000	(United States) Forrest Fezler (1)	
Sep 15	World Open Golf Championship	North Carolina	300,000	(United States) Johnny Miller (10)	
Sep 22	Ohio Kings Island Open	Ohio	150,000	(United States) Miller Barber (9)	
Sep 29	Kaiser International Open Invitational	California	150,000	(United States) Johnny Miller (11)	
Oct 6	Sahara Invitational	Nevada	135,000	(United States) Al Geiberger (5)	
Oct 20	San Antonio Texas Open	Texas	125,000	(United States) Terry Diehl (1)	
Nov 3	Walt Disney World National Team Championship	Florida	250,000	(United States) Hubert Green (7) and (United States) Mac McLendon (1)	Team event

=== Unofficial events ===
The following events were sanctioned by the PGA Tour, but did not carry official money, nor were wins official.

Date	Tournament	Location	Purse ($)	Winner(s)	Notes
Jun 21	Flint Elks Open	Michigan	10,000	(United States) Bryan Abbott	
Nov 24	World Cup	Venezuela	6,300	(South Africa) Bobby Cole and (South Africa) Dale Hayes	Team event
Nov 24	World Cup Individual Trophy	Venezuela	6,300	(South Africa) Bobby Cole	

== Money list ==
The money list was based on prize money won during the season, calculated in U.S. dollars.

Position	Player	Prize money ($)
1	(United States) Johnny Miller	353,021
2	(United States) Jack Nicklaus	238,178
3	(United States) Hubert Green	211,709
4	(United States) Lee Trevino	203,422
5	(United States) J. C. Snead	164,486
6	(United States) Dave Stockton	155,105
7	(United States) Hale Irwin	152,509
8	(United States) Jerry Heard	145,788
9	(United States) Buddy Allin	137,950
10	(United States) Tom Watson	135,474

== Awards ==
Award	Winner	Ref.
PGA Player of the Year	(United States) Johnny Miller	
Scoring leader (Vardon Trophy)	(United States) Lee Trevino	
