= Colgate Hall of Fame Classic =

American golf tournament

Hall of Fame
Tournament information
- Location: Pinehurst, North Carolina
- Established: 1973
- Courses: Pinehurst Resort (No. 2 course)
- Par: 71
- Length: 7,005 yards (6,405 m)
- Tour: PGA Tour
- Format: Stroke play
- Prize fund: US$250,000
- Month played: September
- Final year: 1982

Tournament record score
- Aggregate: 264 Hale Irwin (1977)
- To par: −20 as above

Final champion
- (United States) Jay Haas
- Location in the United States Location in North Carolina

The Hall of Fame tournament was a golf tournament on the PGA Tour from 1973 to 1982. It was played at the Pinehurst Country Club in Pinehurst, North Carolina, which was home to the World Golf Hall of Fame at the time.

It was first played in 1973 as the World Open Golf Championship and was a unique event. It was a 144-hole tournament (twice the normal size) contested over two weeks. The 240 player field was cut after 72 holes to the top 70 plus ties who played the remaining 72 holes. It offered the largest purse ($500,000) and first place prize ($100,000) in PGA Tour history. For the rest of its existence it was played as a standard 72-hole event with purses in line with other PGA Tour events. The purse for the 1982 event was $250,000 with $45,000 going to the winner.

In 1983, a Senior PGA Tour event, the Hall of Fame Tournament, was played at Pinehurst.

== Winners ==
Year	Winner	Score	To par	Margin of victory	Runner(s)-up
Hall of Fame
1982	(United States) Jay Haas	276	−8	Playoff	(United States) John Adams
1981	(United States) Morris Hatalsky	275	−9	2 strokes	(United States) Jerry Pate (United States) D. A. Weibring
1980	(United States) Phil Hancock	275	−9	1 stroke	(United States) Scott Simpson
Colgate Hall of Fame Classic
1979	(United States) Tom Watson (2)	272	−12	Playoff	(United States) Johnny Miller
1978	(United States) Tom Watson	277	−7	1 stroke	(United States) Hale Irwin (United States) Tom Kite (United States) Howard Twitty
Colgate Hall of Fame Golf Classic
1977	(United States) Hale Irwin	264	−20	5 strokes	(United States) Leonard Thompson
World Open Golf Championship
1976	(United States) Raymond Floyd	274	−10	Playoff	(United States) Jerry McGee
1975	(United States) Jack Nicklaus	280	−4	Playoff	(United States) Billy Casper
1974	(United States) Johnny Miller	281	−4	Playoff	(United States) Frank Beard (United States) Bob Murphy (United States) Jack Nicklaus
1973	(United States) Miller Barber	570	+2	3 strokes	(United States) Ben Crenshaw
