= 1978 PGA Tour =

Golf tour season

1978 PGA Tour season
- Duration: January 5, 1978 – November 5, 1978
- Number of official events: 44
- Most wins: (United States) Tom Watson (5)
- Money list: (United States) Tom Watson
- PGA Player of the Year: (United States) Tom Watson

The 1978 PGA Tour was the 63rd season of the PGA Tour, the main professional golf tour in the United States. It was also the 10th season since separating from the PGA of America.

== Schedule ==
The following table lists official events during the 1978 season.

Date	Tournament	Location	Purse (US$)	Winner(s) (Note: The number in parentheses after each winner's name is the number of PGA Tour events they had won up to and including that tournament. This information is only shown for PGA Tour members.)	Notes
Jan 8	Joe Garagiola-Tucson Open	Arizona	200,000	(United States) Tom Watson (9)	
Jan 15	Phoenix Open	Arizona	225,000	(United States) Miller Barber (11)	
Jan 23	Bing Crosby National Pro-Am	California	225,000	(United States) Tom Watson (10)	Pro-Am
Jan 29	Andy Williams-San Diego Open Invitational	California	200,000	(United States) Jay Haas (1)	
Feb 5	Hawaiian Open	Hawaii	250,000	(United States) Hubert Green (13)	
Feb 13	Bob Hope Desert Classic	California	225,000	(United States) Bill Rogers (1)	Pro-Am
Feb 19	Glen Campbell-Los Angeles Open	California	200,000	(United States) Gil Morgan (2)	
Feb 26	Jackie Gleason-Inverrary Classic	Florida	250,000	(United States) Jack Nicklaus (65)	
Mar 6	Florida Citrus Open	Florida	200,000	(United States) Mac McLendon (3)	
Mar 12	Doral-Eastern Open	Florida	200,000	(United States) Tom Weiskopf (14)	
Mar 19	Tournament Players Championship	Florida	300,000	(United States) Jack Nicklaus (66)	Special event
Mar 26	Heritage Classic	South Carolina	225,000	(United States) Hubert Green (14)	Invitational
Apr 2	Greater Greensboro Open	North Carolina	240,000	(Spain) Seve Ballesteros (1)	
Apr 9	Masters Tournament	Georgia	262,402	(South Africa) Gary Player (22)	Major championship
Apr 9	Magnolia Classic	Mississippi	35,000	(United States) Craig Stadler (n/a)	Second Tour (Note: Official money; unofficial win.)
Apr 16	MONY Tournament of Champions	California	225,000	(South Africa) Gary Player (23)	Winners-only event
Apr 16	Tallahassee Open	Florida	80,000	(United States) Barry Jaeckel (1)	Alternate event
Apr 23	Houston Open	Texas	200,000	(South Africa) Gary Player (24)	
Apr 30	First NBC New Orleans Open	Louisiana	200,000	(United States) Lon Hinkle (1)	
May 7	Byron Nelson Golf Classic	Texas	200,000	(United States) Tom Watson (11)	
May 14	Colonial National Invitation	Texas	200,000	(United States) Lee Trevino (23)	Invitational
May 14	Oklahoma City Open	Oklahoma	45,000	(United States) Jeff Hewes (n/a)	Second Tour
May 21	Memorial Tournament	Ohio	250,000	(United States) Jim Simons (2)	Invitational
May 28	Atlanta Classic	Georgia	200,000	(United States) Jerry Heard (5)	
Jun 4	Kemper Open	North Carolina	300,000	(United States) Andy Bean (2)	
Jun 11	Danny Thomas Memphis Classic	Tennessee	250,000	(United States) Andy Bean (3)	
Jun 18	U.S. Open	Colorado	310,200	(United States) Andy North (2)	Major championship
Jun 18	Buick-Goodwrench Open	Michigan	100,000	(Australia) Jack Newton (1)	Alternate event
Jun 25	Canadian Open	Canada	250,000	(United States) Bruce Lietzke (3)	
Jul 2	Western Open	Illinois	225,000	(United States) Andy Bean (4)	
Jul 9	Greater Milwaukee Open	Wisconsin	150,000	(United States) Lee Elder (3)	
Jul 15	The Open Championship	Scotland	£125,000	(United States) Jack Nicklaus (67)	Major championship (Note: Unofficial money event at the time, but retrospectively counted as an official win.)
Jul 16	Ed McMahon-Jaycees Quad Cities Open	Illinois	150,000	(Mexico) Victor Regalado (2)	Alternate event
Jul 23	IVB-Philadelphia Golf Classic	Pennsylvania	250,000	(United States) Jack Nicklaus (68)	
Jul 30	Sammy Davis Jr.-Greater Hartford Open	Connecticut	210,000	(United States) Rod Funseth (3)	
Aug 6	PGA Championship	Pennsylvania	300,000	(United States) John Mahaffey (2)	Major championship
Aug 13	American Optical Classic	Massachusetts	225,000	(United States) John Mahaffey (3)	
Aug 20	American Express Westchester Classic	New York	300,000	(United States) Lee Elder (4)	
Aug 27	Colgate Hall of Fame Classic	North Carolina	250,000	(United States) Tom Watson (12)	
Sep 4	B.C. Open	New York	225,000	(United States) Tom Kite (2)	
Sep 10	Southern Open	Georgia	175,000	(United States) Jerry Pate (5)	
Sep 17	San Antonio Texas Open	Texas	200,000	(United States) Ron Streck (1)	
Sep 24	Anheuser-Busch Golf Classic	California	200,000	(United States) Tom Watson (13)	
Oct 1	World Series of Golf	Ohio	300,000	(United States) Gil Morgan (3)	Limited-field event
Oct 29	Pensacola Open	Florida	125,000	(United States) Mac McLendon (4)	
Nov 5	Walt Disney World National Team Championship	Florida	200,000	(United States) Wayne Levi (1) and (United States) Bob Mann (1)	Team event

=== Unofficial events ===
The following events were sanctioned by the PGA Tour, but did not carry official money, nor were wins official.

Date	Tournament	Location	Purse ($)	Winner(s)	Notes
Dec 3	World Cup	Hawaii	n/a	(United States) John Mahaffey and (United States) Andy North	Team event
Dec 3	World Cup Individual Trophy	Hawaii	n/a	(United States) John Mahaffey	

== Money list ==
The money list was based on prize money won during the season, calculated in U.S. dollars.

Position	Player	Prize money ($)
1	(United States) Tom Watson	362,429
2	(United States) Gil Morgan	267,459
3	(United States) Andy Bean	267,241
4	(United States) Jack Nicklaus	256,672
5	(United States) Hubert Green	247,406
6	(United States) Lee Trevino	228,723
7	(United States) Hale Irwin	191,666
8	(United States) Billy Kratzert	183,681
9	(South Africa) Gary Player	177,336
10	(United States) Jerry Pate	171,999

== Awards ==
Award	Winner	Ref.
PGA Player of the Year	(United States) Tom Watson	
Scoring leader (Vardon Trophy)	(United States) Tom Watson	
