= Wally Armstrong =

American professional golfer (born 1945)

Personal information
- Full name: Walter Armstrong, III
- Nickname: Wally
- Nationality: United States
- Born: June 19, 1945 (age 81) New London, Connecticut, U.S.
- Height: 5 ft 9 in (1.75 m)
- Weight: 160 lb (73 kg)

Career
- Sport: Golf
- College: University of Florida
- Turned professional: 1970
- Former tour: PGA Tour
- Professional wins: 1

Best results in major championships
- Masters Tournament: T5: 1978
- PGA Championship: T19: 1978
- U.S. Open: T16: 1977
- The Open Championship: T13: 1979

Walter Armstrong, III (born June 19, 1945) is an American professional golfer who played on the PGA Tour during the 1970s and 1980s.

== Early life and amateur career ==
Armstrong was born in New London, Connecticut. He attended the University of Florida in Gainesville, Florida, where he played for coach Buster Bishop's Florida Gators men's golf team in National Collegiate Athletic Association (NCAA) competition from 1965 to 1967. Armstrong received All-American honors in 1966. He graduated from the University of Florida with a bachelor's degree in physical education in 1968 and master's degree in public health in 1969.

== Professional career ==
Armstrong played on the PGA Tour from 1974 to 1984. His best finishes were a trio of second places: a tie for second at the 1974 Sahara Invitational, second at the 1975 Pensacola Open, and a second-place tie at the 1977 Western Open. His best finish in a major was a fifth-place tie at the 1978 Masters Tournament. His 280 total in 1978 was a record low for a first-time Masters participant.

Armstrong also played a few Nike Tour and Senior PGA Tour events in 1995 and 1996.

In his post-playing career, Armstrong is a golf instructor and author.

== Professional wins (1) ==
- 1973 Indiana Open

== Results in major championships ==
Tournament	1974	1975	1976	1977	1978	1979	1980	1981	1982	1983	1984
Masters Tournament					T5	CUT					
U.S. Open	CUT	T56	CUT	T16	T20	CUT					CUT
The Open Championship						T13	T45				
PGA Championship		CUT	T49	T48	T19	T54					

Top 10
Did not play

CUT = missed the half-way cut
"T" indicates a tie for a place

== See also ==
- 1973 PGA Tour Qualifying School graduates
- 1982 PGA Tour Qualifying School graduates
- List of Florida Gators men's golfers on the PGA Tour
- List of University of Florida alumni
