= Amarillo Open =

Golf tournament

Ben Hogan Amarillo Open
Tournament information
- Location: Amarillo, Texas
- Established: 1990
- Course: Amarillo Country Club
- Par: 70
- Tour: Ben Hogan Tour
- Format: Stroke play
- Prize fund: $100,000
- Month played: September
- Final year: 1990

Tournament record score
- Aggregate: 200 Lindy Miller (1990)
- To par: −10 as above

Final champion
- (United States) Lindy Miller
- Location in the United States Location in Texas

The Amarillo Open was a golf tournament on the Ben Hogan Tour. It was only played in 1990. It was played in at the Amarillo Country Club in Amarillo, Texas.

Lindy Miller, playing in his first Ben Hogan Tour event, won by two strokes over four other golfers. He received $20,000 for winning the event.

== Winners ==
Year	Winner	Score	To par	Margin of victory	Runners-up
Ben Hogan Amarillo Open
1990	(United States) Lindy Miller	200	−10	2 strokes	(United States) John Daly (United States) Andy Dillard (United States) Kevin Leach (United States) Brian Watts

== See also ==
- Amarillo Ladies' Open, LPGA Tour event at same course in 1966–67
