= 1970 PGA Tour Qualifying School graduates =

This is a list of the 1970 PGA Tour Qualifying School graduates.

The tournament was held in early November at Tucson Country Club in Tucson, Arizona for the first time. There were nine 54-hole district tournaments to determine the final field of 60 players for the final 72-hole qualifying tournament. 18 players earned their tour cards with Bob Barbarossa being medalist. There was a five-for-one playoff for the last card.

== Tournament summary ==
This was the first year that Greg Powers attempted to qualify for the PGA Tour at PGA Tour Qualifying Tournament. He was not successful. Australian player David Graham also attempted to qualify. However, he was not successful either.

== List of graduates ==
Place	Player	Notes
1	(United States) Bob Barbarossa	
T2	(United States) Bob Bourne	
T2	(United States) Bob Clark	
T2	(United States) Dwight Nevil	
T5	(United States) Hubert Green	Winner of 1966 and 1969 Southern Amateur
T5	(United States) Vic Loustalot	
T7	(United States) Richie Karl	
T7	(New Zealand) John Lister	Winner of two British PGA Circuit events
T7	(United States) Rik Massengale	Winner of 1968 Western Amateur
T10	(United States) Jim Dent	
T10	(United States) Bob Lewis	
T10	(United States) Charles Owens	
T13	(United States) Buddy Allin	
T13	(Italy) Roberto Bernardini	Winner of 1968 and 1969 Swiss Open
T13	(United States) Ken Fulton	
T13	(United States) Ralph Johnston	
T13	(United States) Larry White	
18	(United States) Steve Bogan	
