= Monroe Invitational =

Coordinates: 43.096°N 77.496°W

Tournament information
- Location: Pittsford, New York
- Established: 1937
- Course: Monroe Golf Club
- Par: 70
- Length: 6,915 yards (6,323 m)
- Organized by: Monroe Golf Club
- Format: 72-hole stroke play
- Month played: June

Current champion
- Rudy Sautron

Location in the United States

The Monroe Invitational Championship is an annual amateur golf tournament in the United States, played since 1937 at Monroe Golf Club in Pittsford, New York, a suburb southeast of Rochester. Originally a match play event, it switched to 72-hole stroke play format in 1998.

The MIC is a "category B" tournament in the World Amateur Golf Ranking, meaning it is one of the top 100 men's amateur tournaments in the world.

The course at Monroe Golf Club opened in 1924 and was designed by Donald Ross.

Nick Palladino won the 2013 event in a playoff. Due to rain, the event had been shortened to 54 holes. Entering his senior year at the University of Rochester, Palladino became the first Division III player to win the event.

== Winners ==
- 2026 Rudy Sautron
- 2025 Oscar Couilleau
- 2024 Cooper Smith
- 2023 Marshall Meisel
- 2022 Bartley Forrester
- 2021 C. J. Easley
- 2020 Canceled
- 2019 Andy Ogletree
- 2018 Kevin O'Connell
- 2017 Derek Bard
- 2016 Sean Crocker
- 2015 Adam Ball
- 2014 Taylor Pendrith
- 2013 Nick Palladino
- 2012 Thomas Pieters
- 2011 Albin Choi
- 2010 Kyle Peterman
- 2009 Bo Hoag
- 2008 Phillip Mollica
- 2007 Dustin Johnson
- 2006 Phillip Mollica
- 2005 Michael Sim
- 2004 Kyle Reifers
- 2003 Brent Delahoussaye
- 2002 D. J. Trahan
- 2001 Erik Compton
- 2000 Reg Millage
- 1999 Michael Morrison
- 1998 Bill Lunde
- 1997 Michael Boyd
- 1996 Jason Enloe
- 1995 Dan Stone
- 1994 Bud Still
- 1993 Tom Creavy
- 1992 Mike Emery
- 1991 Jean-Paul Hebert
- 1990 Bobby Gage
- 1989 Ryoken Kawagishi
- 1988 Chris DiMarco
- 1987 Nolan Henke
- 1986 Bob Friend
- 1985 John Kircher
- 1984 Bob Hughes
- 1983 Brian Kamm
- 1982 Dave Boeff
- 1981 Jeff Sluman
- 1980 Paul Bonacchi
- 1979 Mike Phillips
- 1978 Mike Mercier
- 1977 Chip Lillich
- 1976 Fred Ridley
- 1975 Rob Ladd
- 1974 Bill Gerber
- 1973 Mike Ford
- 1972 George Burns
- 1971 Terry Diehl
- 1970 Mickey Gallagher
- 1969 Terry Diehl
- 1968 Byron H. Morgan
- 1967 Carl DiCesare
- 1966 Don Allen
- 1965 Don Allen
- 1964 John Konsek
- 1963 C. Stewart Wallace
- 1962 James Campbell
- 1961 J. Peter Bush
- 1960 Jack Thornton
- 1959 John Konsek
- 1958 Warren Simmons
- 1957 Don Allen
- 1956 Frank Breslin
- 1955 Don Allen
- 1954 George Trainor
- 1953 Robert Hill
- 1952 Robert Hill
- 1951 Hank Wheat III
- 1950 Sam Urzetta
- 1949 Sam Urzetta
- 1948 Sam Urzetta
- 1947 Skee Riegel
- 1946 Pete Haas
- 1942–45 No tournament
- 1941 Cliff Goodrich
- 1940 George Trainor
- 1939 Arnold Zimmerman
- 1938 Jack Tucker
- 1937 Fred Allen

== Multiple winners ==
Seven players have won more than one Monroe Invitational, through 2022:

- 4 wins: Don Allen
- 3 wins: Sam Urzetta
- 2 wins: Robert Hill, George Trainor, John Konsek, Terry Diehl, Phillip Mollica
