= Country Club of Rochester =

Golf course in New York, U.S.

Coordinates: 43.1230°N 77.5367°W

- Location in the United States Location in New_York

Club information
- Location: Rochester, New York
- Established: 1895; 131 years ago
- Tota holes: 18
- Website: www.ccrochester.org

The Country Club of Rochester (CCR) is a championship golf course in the towns of Brighton and Pittsford, in suburban Rochester, New York.

== History ==
On January 1, 1885, members of the Genesee Valley Club founded the golf club, on a farm four miles east of downtown.

The original course was of a rather primitive design, reflective of the early era of golf. In 1912, the club hired the Scotsman Donald Ross to design a more modern course on the same grounds. Ross became one of the most famous golf course architects in the game's history. Years later, the Country Club of Rochester course was refined by Robert Trent Jones, a local man who was inspired by Ross as a boy, and ultimately followed in his hero's footsteps to become one of the most famous architects in the game.

The golfing legend Walter Hagen started caddying at the Country Club of Rochester when he was 7½ years old. He progressed to become the assistant club professional, and won the 1914 U.S. Open. Later named head pro at CCR, Hagen went on to be one of the most influential figures in the history of golf, winning 11 majors, 44 official tournaments and dozens of exhibitions, while becoming one of the greatest ambassadors the game of golf has ever known.

Sam Urzetta, who won the 1950 U.S. Amateur, served as head golf professional at the club for 37 years, 1956 to 1993. Urzetta also holds the current course record with an 18-hole score of 61, which he shot three times. He was succeeded as head golf professional by his son, Michael.

The Country Club of Rochester hosted the 1953 U.S. Women's Open, the first women's open sanctioned by the USGA. It also hosted the U.S. Women's Amateur in 1962, and the U.S. Women's Open again in 1973.
