= Northern Texas PGA Championship =

The Northern Texas PGA Championship is a golf tournament that is the championship of the Northern Texas section of the PGA of America. Benny Passons, club pro playing out of Creekview Golf Club in Texas, holds the record for most victories with six. No PGA Tour winners have also won Northern Texas PGA Championship.

== Winners ==
- 2026 Chance Mulligan
- 2025 Matt Lohmeyer
- 2024 Nic Ishee
- 2023 Brandon Bingaman
- 2022 Matt Ryba
- 2021 Chad Moscovic
- 2020 Chad Moscovic
- 2019 Matt Lohmeyer
- 2018 Greg Gregory
- 2017 Ben Kern
- 2016 Benjamin Cuzen
- 2015 Chad Moscovic
- 2014 Cameron Doan
- 2013 Stuart Deane
- 2012 Stuart Deane
- 2011 Dean Larsson
- 2010 Jamie Elliott
- 2009 Dean Larsson
- 2008 Perry Arthur
- 2007 Chad Williams
- 2006 Lindy Miller
- 2005 Matt MacConnell
- 2004 Perry Arthur
- 2003 Todd Sandow
- 2002 Perry Arthur
- 2001 Bob Elliott
- 2000 Tim Hobby
- 1999 Perry Arthur
- 1998 Tim Hobby
- 1997 Gordon Johnson
- 1996 Doug Higgins, Jr.
- 1995 Ed Gatlin
- 1994 Benny Passons
- 1993 Terry Dear
- 1992 Lindy Miller
- 1991 Dow Finsterwald, Jr.
- 1990 Benny Passons
- 1989 Bob Smith
- 1988 Don Robertson
- 1987 Don Robertson
- 1986 Lindy Miller
- 1985 Robert Hoyt
- 1984 Dwight Nevil
- 1983 Robert Hoyt
- 1982 Benny Passons
- 1981 Benny Passons
- 1980 Benny Passons
- 1979 Benny Passons
