= Hubert Green =

American professional golfer (1946–2018)

Personal information
- Full name: Hubert Myatt Green
- Nickname: Hubie
- Nationality: United States
- Born: December 28, 1946 Birmingham, Alabama, U.S.
- Died: June 19, 2018 (aged 71) Birmingham, Alabama, U.S.
- Height: 6 ft 1 in (1.85 m)
- Weight: 165 lb (75 kg; 11.8 st)
- Spouse: Becky Blair

Career
- Sport: Golf
- College: Florida State University
- Turned professional: 1969
- Former tours: PGA Tour; Champions Tour
- Professional wins: 29

Number of wins by tour
- PGA Tour: 19
- European Tour: 3
- Japan Golf Tour: 2
- PGA Tour Champions: 4
- Other: 3

Best results in major championships (wins: 2)
- Masters Tournament: T2: 1978
- PGA Championship: Won: 1985
- U.S. Open: Won: 1977
- The Open Championship: 3rd: 1977

Achievements and awards
- World Golf Hall of Fame: 2007 (member page)
- Champions Tour Comeback Player of the Year: 2002, 2004

Hubert Myatt Green (December 28, 1946 – June 19, 2018) was an American professional golfer. Green won 19 PGA Tour events including two major championships: the 1977 U.S. Open and the 1985 PGA Championship. He was inducted into the World Golf Hall of Fame in 2007.

== Early life ==
In 1946, Green was born in Birmingham, Alabama. He attended and played golf for Shades Valley High School in Birmingham.

== Amateur career ==
Green attended Florida State University (FSU) in Tallahassee, Florida. While at FSU, he won the Southern Amateur in 1966 on his home course at the Country Club of Birmingham. In 1967, he became the Alabama Amateur golf champion, a title he successfully defended in 1968. He also won the Cape Coral Inter-Collegiate Tournament by eight strokes and the Miami Invitational by five strokes, among others. His fourth-place finish in the 1968 U.S. Amateur in Columbus, Ohio, earned him an invitation to play in the 1969 Masters as an amateur. Green graduated from FSU in 1968 with a degree in marketing.

Shortly after graduation, he enlisted in the Alabama National Guard at Enterprise, Alabama. However, in 1969, Green won the Southern Amateur for a second time and was noted as one of the top 10 amateurs in the country.

== Professional career ==
In 1969, Green decided to turn pro. He took a year to earn his PGA of America credentials.

In his 26 years on the PGA Tour, Green had 19 victories, including two major championships: the 1977 U.S. Open and the 1985 PGA Championship. He finished in the top-25 in a third of the PGA Tour events he entered. He also played on three Ryder Cup teams (1977, 1979, and 1985) and was undefeated in singles play.

In 1971, Green won the Houston Champions International and was the PGA Tour's Rookie of the Year. He went on to multiple victories throughout 1970s, but he was at his peak in the latter part of that decade. In March 1976, Green won three PGA Tour events in consecutive weeks. He was also runner-up, one stroke behind, to Baldovino Dassù, at the 1976 Dunlop Masters on the European Tour.

At the 1977 U.S. Open, as Green walked to the 15th tee of the final round, he was notified of a caller anonymously phoning in a death threat on his life. The police presented him with options, and he courageously opted to play on, winning by one stroke over Lou Graham. A month later at the 1977 Open Championship at Turnberry, Green finished third behind Tom Watson and Jack Nicklaus, who were respectively eleven and ten shots clear of Green in their famous "Duel in the Sun." Alluding to the extent to which Watson and Nicklaus's scores were so significantly clear of the rest of the field, he notably remarked, "I won the other tournament." Green was ranked third in Mark McCormack's world golf rankings in 1977, having also won the 1977 Irish Open in August.

Green finished in the top 10 of the Masters six times in seven years from 1974 to 1980. At the 1978 Masters Tournament he came to the final hole about 30 minutes after Gary Player had finished a round of 64. Player had a one-shot lead over Green, who hit a good drive and then a great approach to within three feet of the cup. Green had to back away from the putt when he overheard radio announcer Jim Kelly say something. When Green took the stroke, he pushed it a little to the right and the putt slid by. Green never blamed Kelly, however, telling Golf Digest, "Only an amateur would have been put off by the interruption — or would try to make excuses about it."

At the 1985 PGA Championship, Green won his second major title, two strokes ahead of defending champion Lee Trevino. It was Green's 19th and final victory on the PGA Tour.

In 1998, his second season on the Senior PGA Tour, Green won the Bruno's Memorial Classic in his hometown of Birmingham, Alabama. He shot a final round of 64, playing the last six holes with an eagle, four birdies, and one par to beat Hale Irwin by one stroke.

Green was also active in golf course design, having worked on TPC Southwind, the site for the PGA Tour's St. Jude Classic; Reynolds Plantation in Greensboro, Georgia; and Greystone Golf & Country Club, the site of his Bruno's Classic victory.

Green retired as a touring professional in 2009.

== Personal life ==
In the spring of 2003, Green was diagnosed with oral cancer after his dentist noticed an unusual swelling on the back of his tongue after a routine cleaning and referred him to a medical specialist for evaluation. Green underwent a very difficult and painful regimen of radiation and chemotherapy treatments during the summer of 2003. By the end of 2003, however, his cancer was in remission; his weight crept up to 165 pounds from a low of 143 pounds.

Green died on June 19, 2018, aged 71, in Birmingham, Alabama, from complications due to throat cancer.

== Awards and honors ==
- In 1977, Green was inducted into the Florida State Seminoles Hall of Fame, becoming the first golfer to be enshrined.
- In 1987, he was inducted into the Alabama Sports Hall of Fame.
- In 2002 and 2004, Green received the Champions Tour Comeback Player of the Year award.
- In 2004, he also earned the American Cancer Life Inspiration Award.
- At the 2005 Masters Tournament, Green was presented with the Ben Hogan Award for continuing to be active in golf despite a serious illness.
- In 2006, Green was inducted into the Southern Amateur Hall of Fame.
- In 2007, he was inducted into the World Golf Hall of Fame.

== Amateur wins ==
this list may be incomplete

- 1966 Southern Amateur
- 1967 Alabama Amateur
- 1968 Alabama Amateur, Cape Coral Invitational, Miami Invitational
- 1969 Southern Amateur

== Professional wins (29) ==
=== PGA Tour wins (19) ===
Legend
Major championships (2)
Other PGA Tour (17)

No.	Date	Tournament	Winning score	Margin of victory	Runner(s)-up
1	May 16, 1971	Houston Champions International	−4 (68-69-72-71=280)	Playoff	(United States) Don January
2	Apr 22, 1973	Tallahassee Open	−11 (69-67-70-71=277)	1 stroke	(United States) Jim Simons
3	Sep 23, 1973	B.C. Open	−18 (69-65-65-67=266)	6 strokes	(United States) Dwight Nevil
4	Feb 10, 1974	Bob Hope Desert Classic	−19 (72-69-66-69-65=341)	2 strokes	(United States) Bert Yancey
5	Mar 17, 1974	Greater Jacksonville Open	−12 (70-67-68-71=276)	3 strokes	(United States) John Mahaffey
6	Jun 9, 1974	IVB-Philadelphia Golf Classic	−17 (70-67-66-68=271)	4 strokes	(United States) Hale Irwin
7	Nov 3, 1974	Walt Disney World National Team Championship (with (United States) Mac McLendon)	−33 (64-64-63-64=255)	1 stroke	(United States) Sam Snead and (United States) J. C. Snead, (United States) Ed Sneed and (United States) Bert Yancey
8	Sep 7, 1975	Southern Open	−16 (68-66-66-64=264)	3 strokes	(United States) John Schroeder
9	Mar 14, 1976	Doral-Eastern Open	−18 (66-70-65-69=270)	6 strokes	(United States) Mark Hayes, (United States) Jack Nicklaus
10	Mar 21, 1976	Greater Jacksonville Open (2)	−12 (72-67-67-70=276)	2 strokes	(United States) Miller Barber
11	Mar 28, 1976	Sea Pines Heritage Classic	−10 (68-67-66-73=274)	5 strokes	(United States) Jerry McGee
12	Jun 19, 1977	U.S. Open	−2 (69-67-72-70=278)	1 stroke	(United States) Lou Graham
13	Feb 5, 1978	Hawaiian Open	−14 (69-66-68-71=274)	Playoff	(United States) Billy Kratzert
14	Mar 26, 1978	Heritage Classic (2)	−7 (70-70-70-67=277)	3 strokes	(United States) Hale Irwin
15	Feb 11, 1979	Hawaiian Open (2)	−21 (68-67-63-69=267)	3 strokes	(United States) Fuzzy Zoeller
16	Apr 29, 1979	First NBC New Orleans Open	−15 (69-67-69-68=273)	1 stroke	(United States) Frank Conner, (United States) Bruce Lietzke, (United States) Steve Melnyk, (United States) Lee Trevino
17	Aug 16, 1981	Sammy Davis Jr.-Greater Hartford Open	−20 (68-65-67-64=264)	1 stroke	(United States) Bobby Clampett, (United States) Fred Couples, (United States) Roger Maltbie
18	Oct 14, 1984	Southern Open (2)	−15 (65-66-67-67=265)	6 strokes	(United States) Rex Caldwell, (United States) Scott Hoch, (United States) Corey Pavin
19	Aug 11, 1985	PGA Championship	−6 (67-69-70-72=278)	2 strokes	(United States) Lee Trevino

PGA Tour playoff record (2–3)

No.	Year	Tournament	Opponent	Result
1	1971	Houston Champions International	(United States) Don January	Won with birdie on first extra hole
2	1975	Sammy Davis Jr.-Greater Hartford Open	(United States) Don Bies	Lost to birdie on second extra hole
3	1978	Hawaiian Open	(United States) Billy Kratzert	Won with par on second extra hole
4	1978	World Series of Golf	(United States) Gil Morgan	Lost to par on first extra hole
5	1986	Doral-Eastern Open	(United States) Andy Bean	Lost to birdie on fourth extra hole

=== European Tour wins (3) ===
Legend
Major championships (2)
Other European Tour (1)

No.	Date	Tournament	Winning score	Margin of victory	Runner-up
1	Jun 19, 1977	U.S. Open	−2 (69-67-72-70=278)	1 stroke	(United States) Lou Graham
2	Aug 28, 1977	Carroll's Irish Open	−5 (70-69-74-70=283)	1 stroke	(United States) Ben Crenshaw
3	Aug 11, 1985	PGA Championship	−6 (67-69-70-72=278)	2 strokes	(United States) Lee Trevino

=== PGA of Japan Tour wins (2) ===
No.	Date	Tournament	Winning score	Margin of victory	Runner(s)-up
1	Nov 30, 1975	Dunlop Phoenix Tournament	−16 (67-70-67-68=272)	6 strokes	(Japan) Kosaku Shimada
2	Dec 1, 1985	Casio World Open	+1 (72-76-67-74=289)	Playoff	(Australia) Wayne Grady, (United States) Scott Hoch, (Japan) Nobumitsu Yuhara

PGA of Japan Tour playoff record (1–0)

No.	Year	Tournament	Opponents	Result
1	1985	Casio World Open	(Australia) Wayne Grady, (United States) Scott Hoch, (Japan) Nobumitsu Yuhara	Won with par on second extra hole Grady and Yuhara eliminated by par on first hole

=== Other wins (1) ===
No.	Date	Tournament	Winning score	Margin of victory	Runner-up
1	Jul 29, 1980	Jerry Ford Invitational	−5 (71-66=137)	Shared title with (United States) J. C. Snead	

=== Senior PGA Tour wins (4) ===
No.	Date	Tournament	Winning score	Margin of victory	Runner(s)-up
1	May 3, 1998	Bruno's Memorial Classic	−13 (70-69-64=203)	1 stroke	(United States) Hale Irwin
2	Mar 12, 2000	Audi Senior Classic	−19 (65-70-62=197)	5 strokes	(United States) Jim Colbert, (United States) Dean Overtuff, (United States) Doug Tewell
3	Sep 17, 2000	Kroger Senior Classic	−10 (66-70-64=200)	1 stroke	(United States) Larry Nelson
4	Aug 4, 2002	Lightpath Long Island Classic	−14 (67-64-68=199)	Playoff	(United States) Hale Irwin

Champions Tour playoff record (1–1)

No.	Year	Tournament	Opponent	Result
1	2000	Home Depot Invitational	(United States) Bruce Fleisher	Lost to birdie on third extra hole
2	2002	Lightpath Long Island Classic	(United States) Hale Irwin	Won with birdie on seventh extra hole

=== Other senior wins (2) ===
- 1999 Liberty Mutual Legends of Golf (with Gil Morgan)
- 2017 Bass Pro Shops Legends of Golf – Legends Division (with Allen Doyle)

== Major championships ==
=== Wins (2) ===
Year	Championship	54 holes	Winning score	Margin	Runner-up
1977	U.S. Open	1 shot lead	−2 (69-67-72-70=278)	1 stroke	(United States) Lou Graham
1985	PGA Championship	3 shot lead	−6 (67-69-70-72=278)	2 strokes	(United States) Lee Trevino

=== Results timeline ===
Tournament	1969	1970	1971	1972	1973	1974	1975	1976	1977	1978	1979
Masters Tournament	CUT			T22	T14	T9	T8	T19	T8	T2	T10
U.S. Open				T55	CUT	T26	T18	6	1	CUT	24
The Open Championship						4	T32	T5	3	T29	T41
PGA Championship				T16	DQ	T3		T30	T62	T26	T16

Tournament	1980	1981	1982	1983	1984	1985	1986	1987	1988	1989
Masters Tournament	4	T11	43			CUT	T36	T35	T19	T34
U.S. Open	T32	T37	CUT	T60	T30	CUT	T55	CUT	CUT	T9
The Open Championship	T6	T23	CUT	T19	CUT		WD		T52	
PGA Championship	T68	T27	CUT	CUT	T14	1	T41	T56	WD	66

Tournament	1990	1991	1992	1993	1994	1995	1996
Masters Tournament	CUT						
U.S. Open	CUT						
The Open Championship							
PGA Championship	CUT	CUT	CUT	T51	CUT	CUT	CUT

Win
Top 10
Did not play

CUT = missed the halfway cut (3rd round cut in 1982 and 1984 Open Championships)
DQ = disqualified
WD = withdrew
"T" indicates a tie for a place.

=== Summary ===
Tournament	Wins	2nd	3rd	Top-5	Top-10	Top-25	Events	Cuts made
Masters Tournament	0	1	0	2	6	11	18	15
U.S. Open	1	0	0	1	3	5	19	12
The Open Championship	0	0	1	3	4	6	13	10
PGA Championship	1	0	1	2	2	5	24	14
Totals	2	1	2	8	15	27	74	51

- Most consecutive cuts made – 16 (1974 Masters – 1978 Masters)
- Longest streak of top-10s – 3 (twice)

== Results in The Players Championship ==
Tournament	1974	1975	1976	1977	1978	1979	1980	1981	1982	1983	1984	1985	1986	1987	1988	1989	1990	1991	1992	1993	1994	1995
The Players Championship	T6	3	T12	T40	T9	T20	T8	T37	T6	CUT	T66	CUT	CUT	T15	CUT	CUT	T46	CUT	CUT	WD	WD	CUT

Top 10

CUT = missed the halfway cut
WD = withdrew
"T" indicates a tie for a place

== U.S. national team appearances ==
Professional

- Ryder Cup: 1977 (winners), 1979 (winners), 1985
- World Cup: 1977

== See also ==
- 1970 PGA Tour Qualifying School graduates
- List of Florida State Seminoles men's golfers
- List of golfers with most PGA Tour wins
- List of longest PGA Tour win streaks
