= IVB-Philadelphia Golf Classic =

Golf tournament

IVB-Golf Classic
Tournament information
- Location: Lafayette Hill, Pennsylvania
- Established: 1963
- Course: Whitemarsh Valley Country Club
- Par: 71
- Length: 6,687 yards (6,115 m)
- Tour: PGA Tour
- Format: Stroke play
- Prize fund: US$250,000
- Month played: July/August
- Final year: 1980

Tournament record score
- Aggregate: 270 Jack Nicklaus (1978)
- To par: −17 Hubert Green (1974)

Final champion
- (United States) Doug Tewell
- Location in the United States Location in Pennsylvania

The IVB-Philadelphia Golf Classic was a golf tournament on the PGA Tour. It was played at the Whitemarsh Valley Country Club in Lafayette Hill, Pennsylvania from 1963 to 1980.

== Tournament highlights ==
- 1963: Arnold Palmer wins the inaugural version of the tournament by one shot over Lionel Hebert. The $26,000 first prize was the most Palmer collected for a win up to that time.
- 1965: Jack Nicklaus successfully defends his title. He eagles the 71st hole to win by 2 shots over Joe Campbell and Doug Sanders.
- 1966: Jack Nicklaus narrowly misses winning in Philadelphia for the third consecutive year. Don January beats him by one shot.
- 1969: A four-player sudden death playoff is won by Dave Hill when he makes an eleven-foot birdie putt on the first extra hole to defeat Tommy Jacobs, Gay Brewer, and R. H. Sikes.
- 1973: Tom Weiskopf wins for the second consecutive week. He beats Jim Barber by four shots.
- 1975: Tom Jenkins wins by one shot over Johnny Miller and by two over Bob Wynn. Wynn was leading by two shots until he made a quadruple-bogey eight on the tournament's 71st hole.
- 1976: Future World Golf Hall of Fame member Tom Kite wins for the first time on the PGA Tour. He defeats Terry Diehl on the fifth hole of a sudden death playoff.
- 1980: Doug Tewell wins the last edition of the tournament. He beats Tom Kite by one shot.

== Winners ==
Year	Winner	Score	To par	Margin of victory	Runner(s)-up
IVB-Golf Classic
1980	(United States) Doug Tewell	272	−12	1 stroke	(United States) Tom Kite
IVB-Philadelphia Golf Classic
1979	(United States) Lou Graham	273	−11	Playoff	(United States) Bobby Wadkins
1978	(United States) Jack Nicklaus (3)	270	−14	1 stroke	(United States) Gil Morgan
1977	(United States) Jerry McGee	272	−12	4 strokes	(New Zealand) John Lister (Australia) Bob Shearer
IVB-Bicentennial Golf Classic
1976	(United States) Tom Kite	277	−7	Playoff	(United States) Terry Diehl
IVB-Philadelphia Golf Classic
1975	(United States) Tom Jenkins	275	−9	1 stroke	(United States) Johnny Miller
1974	(United States) Hubert Green	271	−17	4 strokes	(United States) Hale Irwin
1973	(United States) Tom Weiskopf (2)	274	−14	4 strokes	(United States) Jim Barber
1972	(United States) J. C. Snead	282	−6	1 stroke	(United States) Chi-Chi Rodríguez
1971	(United States) Tom Weiskopf	274	−14	1 stroke	(United States) Dave Hill
1970	(United States) Billy Casper	274	−4	3 strokes	(United States) Terry Wilcox
1969	(United States) Dave Hill	279	−9	Playoff	(United States) Gay Brewer (United States) Tommy Jacobs (United States) R. H. Sikes
Philadelphia Golf Classic
1968	(United States) Bob Murphy	276	−12	Playoff	(United States) Labron Harris Jr.
1967	(United States) Dan Sikes	276	−12	2 strokes	(United States) George Archer
1966	(United States) Don January	278	−10	1 stroke	(United States) Jack Nicklaus
1965	(United States) Jack Nicklaus (2)	277	−11	1 stroke	(United States) Joe Campbell (United States) Doug Sanders
Whitemarsh Open Invitational
1964	(United States) Jack Nicklaus	276	−12	1 stroke	(South Africa) Gary Player
1963	(United States) Arnold Palmer	281	−7	1 stroke	(United States) Lionel Hebert
