= Don Allen (golfer) =

American golfer (1938–2022)

Donald C. Allen (May 19, 1938 – June 16, 2022) was an American amateur golfer. In 2012, he became an inaugural member of the New York State Golf Association Hall of Fame.

Allen grew up near Rochester, New York. In 1965 and 1967 he was selected to the Walker Cup team, and also played on the Americas Cup team in those years. He never won the U.S. Amateur, but won the New York State Amateur six times between 1961 and 1973. He also won two NYSGA Mid-Amateur tournaments and three NYSGA Senior Amateur tournaments. He won the Monroe Invitational four times. He appeared in the Masters Tournament in 1965, 1966, and 1967.

Allen died in Rochester on June 16, 2022, at the age of 84.

== Amateur wins ==
- 1955 Monroe Invitational
- 1957 Monroe Invitational
- 1959 RDGA District Championship
- 1961 New York State Amateur, RDGA District Championship
- 1962 RDGA District Championship
- 1963 New York State Amateur, RDGA District Championship
- 1964 New York State Amateur
- 1965 Monroe Invitational
- 1966 Monroe Invitational
- 1970 New York State Amateur
- 1972 New York State Amateur
- 1973 New York State Amateur
- 1974 RDGA District Championship
- 1978 RDGA District Championship
- 1985 NYSGA Mid-Amateur
- 1987 NYSGA Mid-Amateur
- 1994 NYSGA Men's Senior, RDGA Senior Championship
- 1996 NYSGA Men's Senior
- 1997 NYSGA Men's Senior
- 1999 RDGA Senior Championship

== U.S. national team appearances ==
Amateur

- Walker Cup: 1965 (tied, cup retained), 1967 (winners)
- Americas Cup: 1965, 1967 (winners)
