= Sam Urzetta =

American golfer

Personal information
- Full name: Samuel Urzetta
- Nationality: United States
- Born: March 19, 1926 Rochester, New York, U.S.
- Died: April 8, 2011 (aged 85) East Rochester, New York, U.S.

Career
- Sport: Golf
- College: St. Bonaventure University
- Turned professional: 1954
- Former tour: PGA Tour
- Professional wins: 3

Best results in major championships
- Masters Tournament: T12: 1956
- PGA Championship: CUT: 1960, 1961, 1962, 1966, 1968
- U.S. Open: T29: 1951
- The Open Championship: DNP

Samuel Urzetta (March 19, 1926 – April 8, 2011) was an American professional golfer, best known for winning the 1950 U.S. Amateur.

== Amateur career ==
Urzetta attended St. Bonaventure University where he captained the basketball team and led the nation in free-throw shooting percentage as a junior. He was inducted into the St. Bonaventure Athletics Hall of Fame in 1969.

In 1950, Urzetta won the U.S. Amateur over Frank Stranahan. The match went a record 39 holes (scheduled for 36), a record that still stands (although tied in 2000). He played on the U.S. Walker Cup team in 1951 and 1953.

== Professional career ==
Urzetta turned professional in 1954 and played on the PGA Tour and then became the head professional at the Country Club of Rochester from 1956 to 1993. He was elected to the Hall of Fame of the Western New York Section of the PGA of America in 1986.

== Amateur wins ==
this list may be incomplete

- 1948 Monroe Invitational, New York State Amateur
- 1949 Monroe Invitational
- 1950 Monroe Invitational, U.S. Amateur

== Professional wins ==
- Western New York PGA (three times)

== Awards and honors ==
- In 1969, Urzetta was inducted into the St. Bonaventure Athletics Hall of Fame
- In 1986, Urzetta was elected to the PGA of America's Hall of Fame for its Western New York Section

== U.S. national team appearances ==
Amateur

- Walker Cup: 1951 (winners), 1953 (winners)
- Americas Cup: 1952 (winners)

== See also ==
- List of male golfers
