= Monroe Golf Club =

Golf course in Pittsford, New York

- Location in the United States
- 43.096°N 77.496°W

Club information
- Location: Pittsford, New York
- Established: 1924
- Type: Private
- Tota holes: 18
- Tournaments: Monroe Invitational; LPGA Championship (2014)
- Website: monroegolfclub.com
- Designed by: Donald Ross
- Par: 70
- Length: 6,915 yd (6,323 m)
- Course rating: 73.5
- Slope rating: 130

Monroe Golf Club is a Donald Ross-designed course in Pittsford, New York, a suburb southeast of Rochester. Opened for play in 1924, it is home to the annual Monroe Invitational Championship, a highly regarded amateur event first played in 1937.

Monroe Golf Club was ranked #96 in Golfweek's 2011 top 100 best classic courses. Nearby to the northwest is the well-known Oak Hill Country Club, also designed by Ross.

== Monroe Invitational ==
In the semi-finals of the 53rd Monroe Invitational Championship in 1993, 17-year-old Tiger Woods hit a miraculous low, rising cut four iron that sliced some 70 yards (64 m) under, around, and over the maples left of the fairway. The ball traveled 210 yards (192 m) to just 8 feet (2.4 m) from the hole. Tom Creavy made 3, Woods a 4, and Creavy went on to win 3&2. Woods was one up after ten, but the 22-year-old Creavy won four of the next five holes, and halved the 16th to end the match. It was Woods' only loss in match play over a five-year period that began with three consecutive U.S. Junior Amateurs (1991–93) and ended with three consecutive U.S. Amateurs (1994–96). Creavy won the final match the next day for the MIC title and later became a leading instructor, with Se-Ri Pak among his students. His great uncle, also named Tom Creavy, won the PGA Championship in 1931, defeating Gene Sarazen in the match play final.

Originally a match play event, the MIC switched to 72-hole stroke play in 1998.

== LPGA Championship ==
In August 2014, the course hosted the Wegmans LPGA Championship, a major on the LPGA Tour., with a change in date and location from Locust Hill Country Club which held the tournament in June in the previous four years. However it would only host the Championship for one year, due to the PGA of America taking over as the organizer starting 2015 and moving the venue to different locations year to year.
