= Bob Fry (golfer) =

American professional golfer (1922–1993)

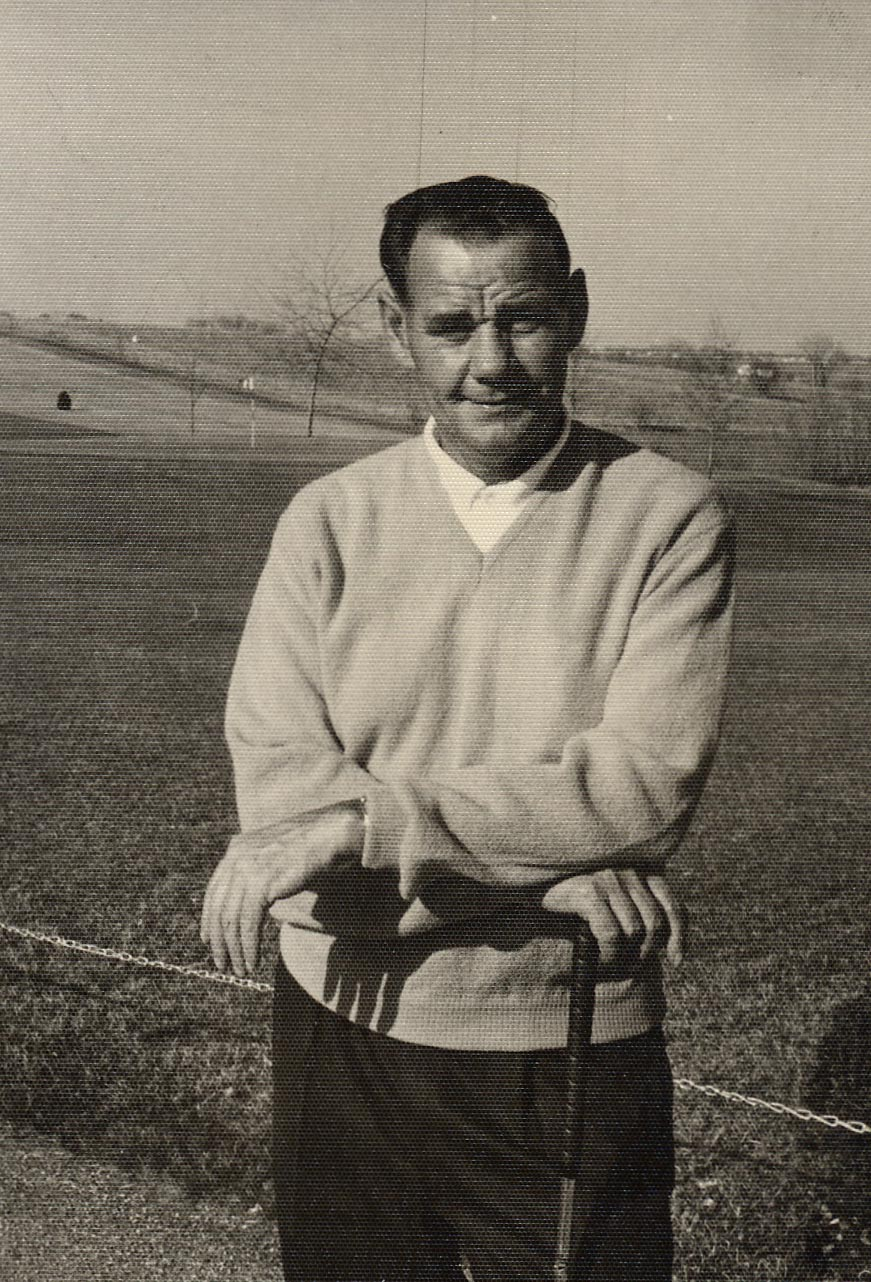
Fry at Crow Valley Golf Club in Bettendorf, Iowa

Robert Nelson Fry (November 29, 1922 – January 12, 1993) was an American professional golfer instrumental in the development of golf in the Iowa and Illinois area.

== Early life and amateur career ==
Born in Keokuk, Iowa, Fry began his golf career as a caddy at the age of 9.

The first documentation of Fry's significant amateur play was in 1942 when the Iowa Open and Iowa Amateur were combined into a 54-hole tournament at the Sunnyside course in Waterloo. He came from nowhere and finished fifth in the field. Starting with a mediocre 77, he went through the last 36 holes with a 71-69. He came back in 1947, after 5 years in the military, to be runner up in the Iowa Amateur bowing in match play to Fred Gordon of Belmond 3 and 2.

During 1943 and 1944, Sgt. Bob Fry served as a navigator in the 69th Squadron, 433rd Troop Carrier Group in New Guinea and Guam under Commanding Officer Cecil B. Guile, Lt. Col., Air Corps. 433rd TC was the largest troop carrier group in the world. According to the group's journal,

Troop Carrier is, and has been throughout this war, an integral part of the Army Air Forces. When invasions have been made in various theaters of operations and paratroopers and airborne infantry had to be flown in, in advance of the other invasions forces, when reinforcements were imperative, when ammunition or engineering equipment were running low, when wounded had to be evacuated, or when General Patton suddenly needed maps of Germany during his rapid advance, Troop Carrier was called upon - and came through. In spite of being the youngest organization in the Army Air Forces, Troop Carrier has established an enviable record, which has been acclaimed and commended by all Allied Armed Forces which Troop Carrier has so faithfully served.

== Professional career ==
Fry moved to Fort Madison, Iowa, to become head pro at the Fort Madison Country Club at the request of brothers Walt and John Sheaffer of Sheaffer Pen company.

In 1960, Fry took the head pro position for three municipal golf courses in Davenport, Iowa (Emeis, Duck Creek and Credit Island). He organized an exhibition match with Arnold Palmer and Gary Player at Emeis Golf Course in the early 1960s. This later became the Quad Cities Open.

In 1970, Fry, Heisman Trophy winner Johnny Lujack, Franklin "Whitey" Barnard, John Deere Corporation brothers Jim and Ray McLaughlin, restaurant owner Nic Chirekos and several others developed Crow Valley Golf Club in Bettendorf, Iowa. Originally intended to be a men's only club, and designed specifically with the PGA Tour in mind, the club was forced to open the links to women with the advent of the 'women's lib' movement. Fry brought the Quad Cities Open to Crow Valley Golf Club. This tournament continues as an annual PGA Tour event through contemporary times.

"Fry...said the idea of a Quad-City Open probably had its hatching back in 1964. "That year and again in '65, I held a $5,000 tourney at Emeis.., but we dropped the tourney because the PGA and Tournament Players Division (TPD) were having their differences," he explained. "It took about five years for the two groups to straighten out their squabble, " Fry continued. "In 1970, the two groups adopted a program for smaller sponsoring tournaments, calling them satellites instead of labeling them class B or minor meets," said Fry. "I happened to be on the list for such an event - and working through Marshall Dann (the executive director of the Western Golf Association) and the right parties here in the Quad-Cities - we landed last year's [1971] tourney." This was probably the best of the 16 satellite stops on the tour in 1971.

Fry won the Iowa Section PGA tournament five times, including a 1965 record-setting 66-62=128 round at Marshalltown to win by 15 strokes. He played in the Western Open countless times, and qualified for the Los Angeles, Tucson and Phoenix Opens for over 20 years. In 1961, Fry shot a qualifying round of 68 at Scottsdale Country Club, tying for low honors in the $32,500 Phoenix Open. He qualified for six PGA Championships, one year recording a 66-62=128 to lead the nation in qualifying. He also recorded 18 holes in one.

In June 1972, Fry defeated Bettendorf pro, Gary Lockie, in a two-hole playoff of the Iowa PGA Match Play to win the Iowa-Western Illinois section title. "There were 49 pros entered with the top 16 advancing to the finals of match play competition where they played 9-hole matches. The remainder played an 18-hole consolation round. A birdie on the par 5, second hole put Lockie ahead before Fry drilled a 20-footer home for a bird on the par 3, fourth hole. Lockie regained the advantage on the next hole when Fry bogeyed, but on the seventh hole it was just the opposite - a par for Fry with Lockie taking a bogey. On the second hole of their playoff after both parred the first extra hold, Lockie's first shot on the par 4, 383-yard 11th hole sailed into the trees on the left side. His second shot was short of the green and the ensuing chip was to the back edge of the green. Lockie then 2-putted for a bogey. Fry settled for a routine par on the hole to claim the title. Fry pocketed $400 of the combined $1000 purse."

Touring pros Lonnie Nielsen, Tommy Aaron, and Jim Jamieson were three of Fry's more famous pupils. Nielsen once said, "I learned more about golf in a two-hour conversation over coffee with Bob Fry than I learned in a lifetime of lessons and practicing."

Jim Jamieson defeated Tommy Aaron in the Western Open in June 1972. "Jamieson...readily admitted [his] good scores were due to the teachings of Bob Fry of Crow Valley Golf Club... Fry gave Jamieson tips on driving... Jamieson missed only three greens in regulation, making three birdies and an eagle in one 5-hole stretch. Jamieson explained Fry got him to concentrate on the tie instead of rushing to get it over with.

The Michigan Golfer On-Line, in their discussion of Garland-Lewiston, part of the Gaylord Golf Mecca, says instructor "Lee Woodruff's philosophy of teaching comes from his long-time mentor, Bob Fry of Iowa. Fry always talked about balance in his lessons."

Jim Hasley, an assistant to Fry before becoming a pro on his own, tells this story of Fry's character: "A member from one of the local country clubs came into the pro shop and wanted to purchase some new clubs. Fry asked why the member didn't buy these from his own pro. The member said he had been in an argument with the other pro. After the sale, Fry figured out the profit, wrote out a check to the other pro for that amount, and sent the check with a fatherly note to the other pro to get back on good terms with his member."

Fry was one of the few club professionals on the paid staff of Wilson Sporting Goods. Fry helped design and test new equipment. Many still use the special "Bob Fry loft" irons. Joe Phillips of Wilson Sporting Goods upon hearing of Fry's death said, "Bob Fry was the epitome of a golf professional. Although an expert golfer himself, he dedicated his life to teaching golf and helping others improve their game. We've lost a good friend."

Fry was Iowa PGA Section president from 1957 to 1959.

== Awards and honors ==
Fry was inducted posthumously into the Iowa Golf Hall of Fame March 22, 1993.

== Bob Fry Tells Club Golf Pros What's Important ==
- 1. He must be a good professional instructor and know the fundamentals and mechanics of the golf swing.
- 2. He must be a good merchandiser and stock his shop to the satisfaction of club members.
- 3. He must be familiar with every phase of golf activity at his club and must understand tournament operations.
- 4. He must be a public relations man for his club.
- 5. He must have knowledge of the golf course, and the many problems connected with it.
- 6. He must understand the problems of the club manager and give him all possible cooperation.

== Course records ==
- Emeis Golf Course, Davenport, Iowa (29-29=58)
- Rock Island Arsenal, Rock Island, Illinois (63)
- Crow Valley Golf Club, Bettendorf, Iowa (62)
- Tamarron Golf Resort, Durango, Colorado (62)

== Professional wins ==
- 1967 Iowa Open
- 1959 Iowa PGA Championship
- 1963 Iowa PGA Championship
- 1965 Iowa PGA Championship
- 1966 Iowa PGA Championship
- 1972 Iowa-Western Illinois Match Play
- 1974 Iowa PGA Championship

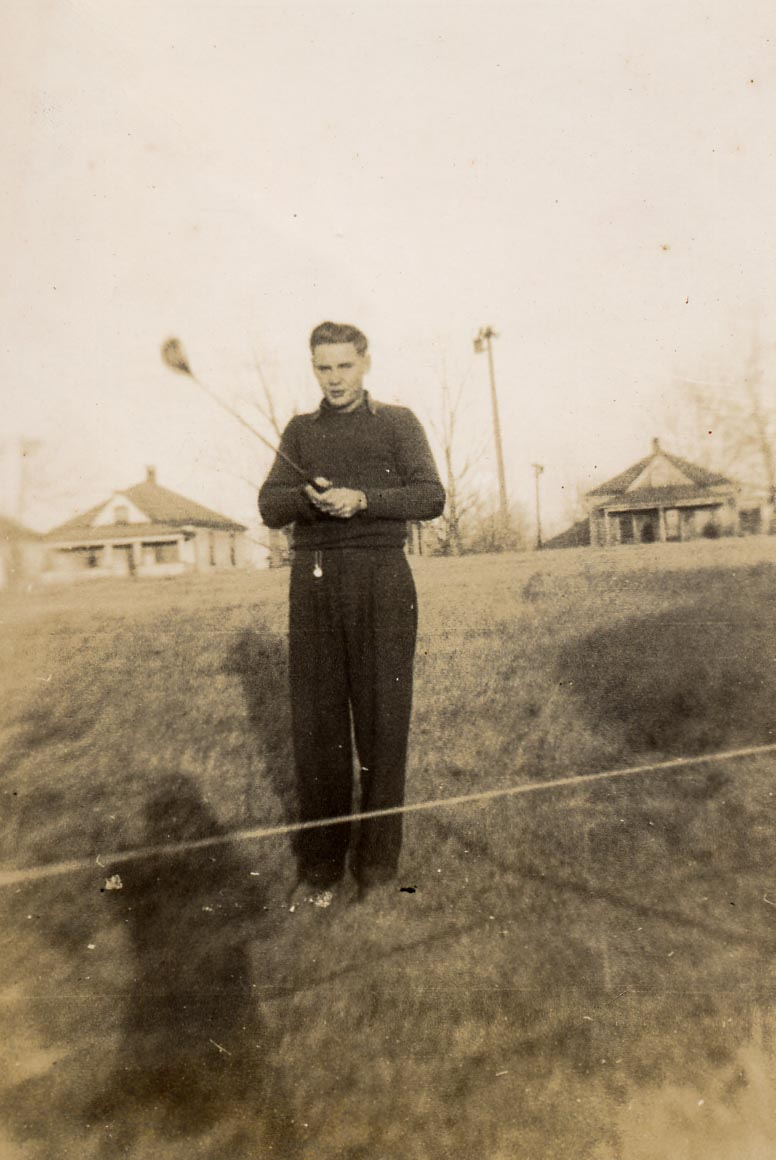
Bob Fry in high school

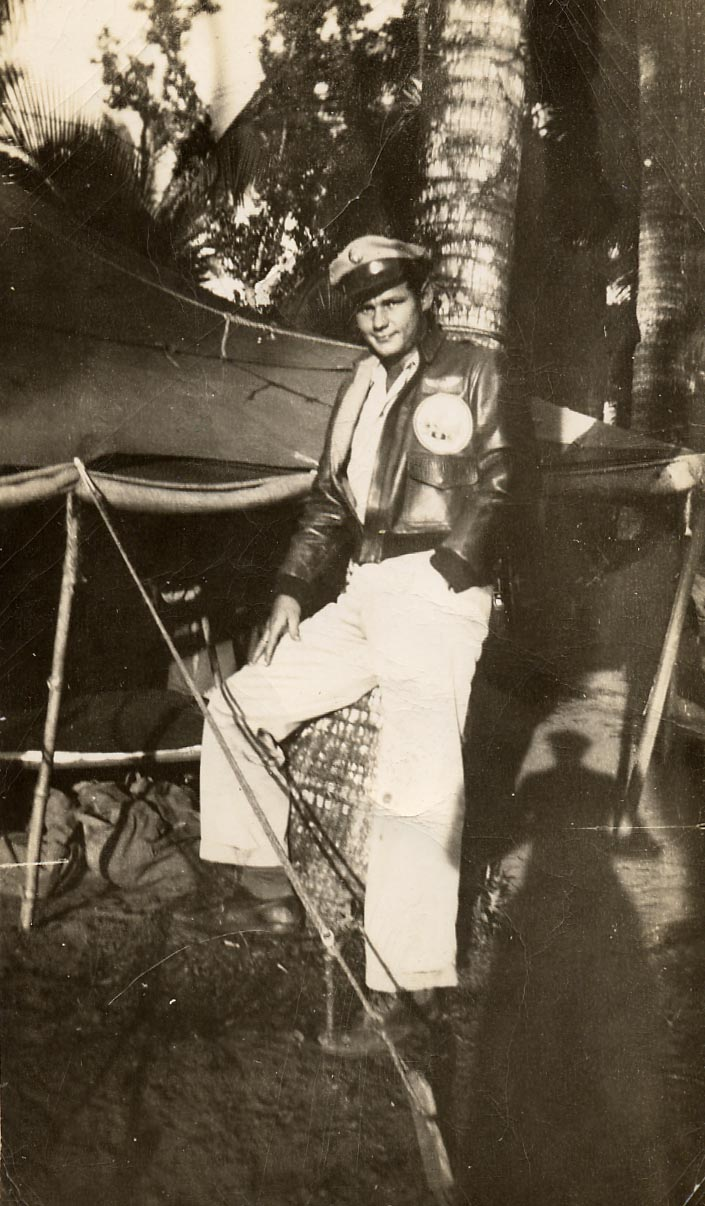
Bob Fry during WWII in New Guinea

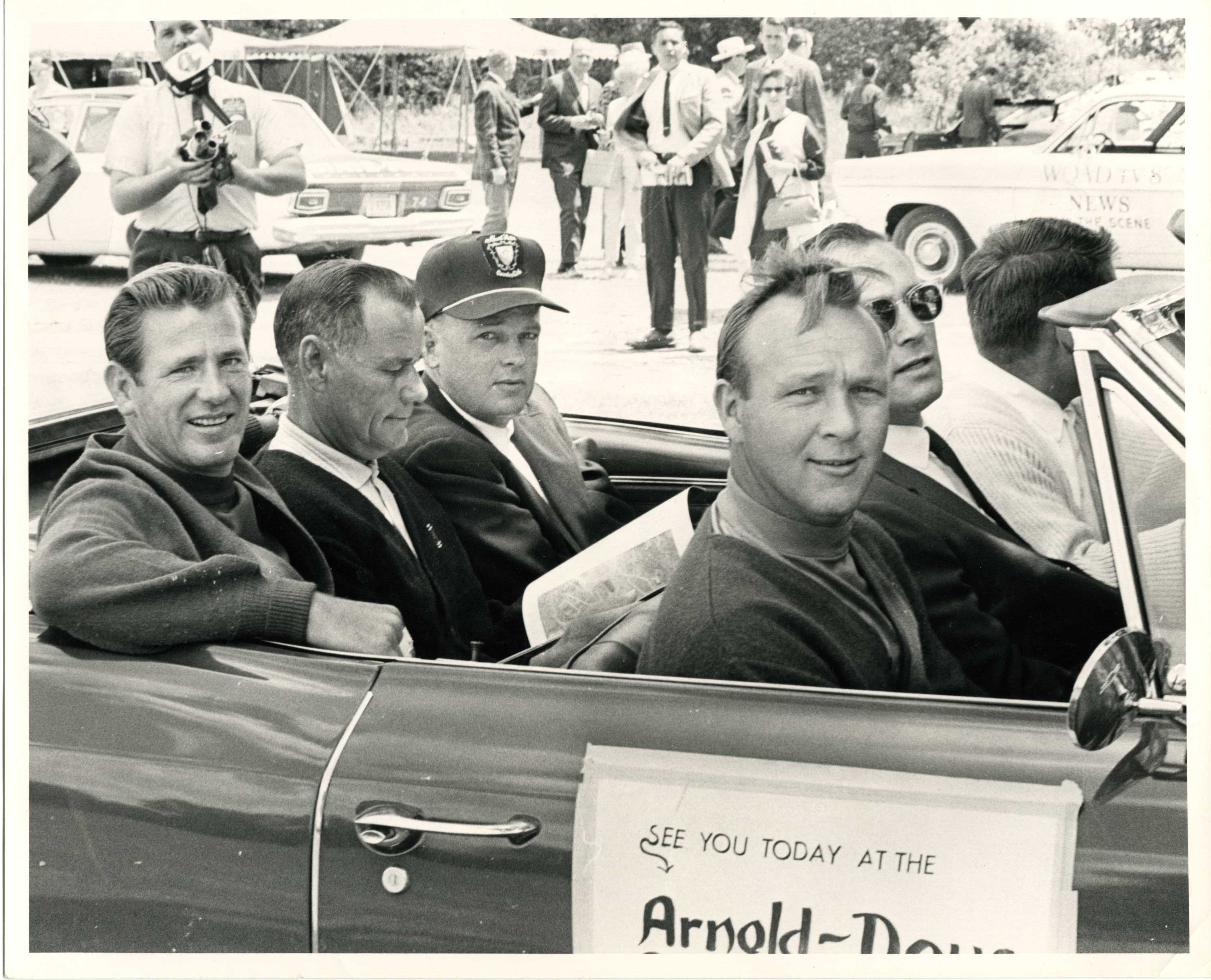
Palmer-Player Exhibition: Doug Sanders, Bob Fry, and Jack Rule in back seat; Arnold Palmer, Johnny Lujack, and unknown driver in front seat

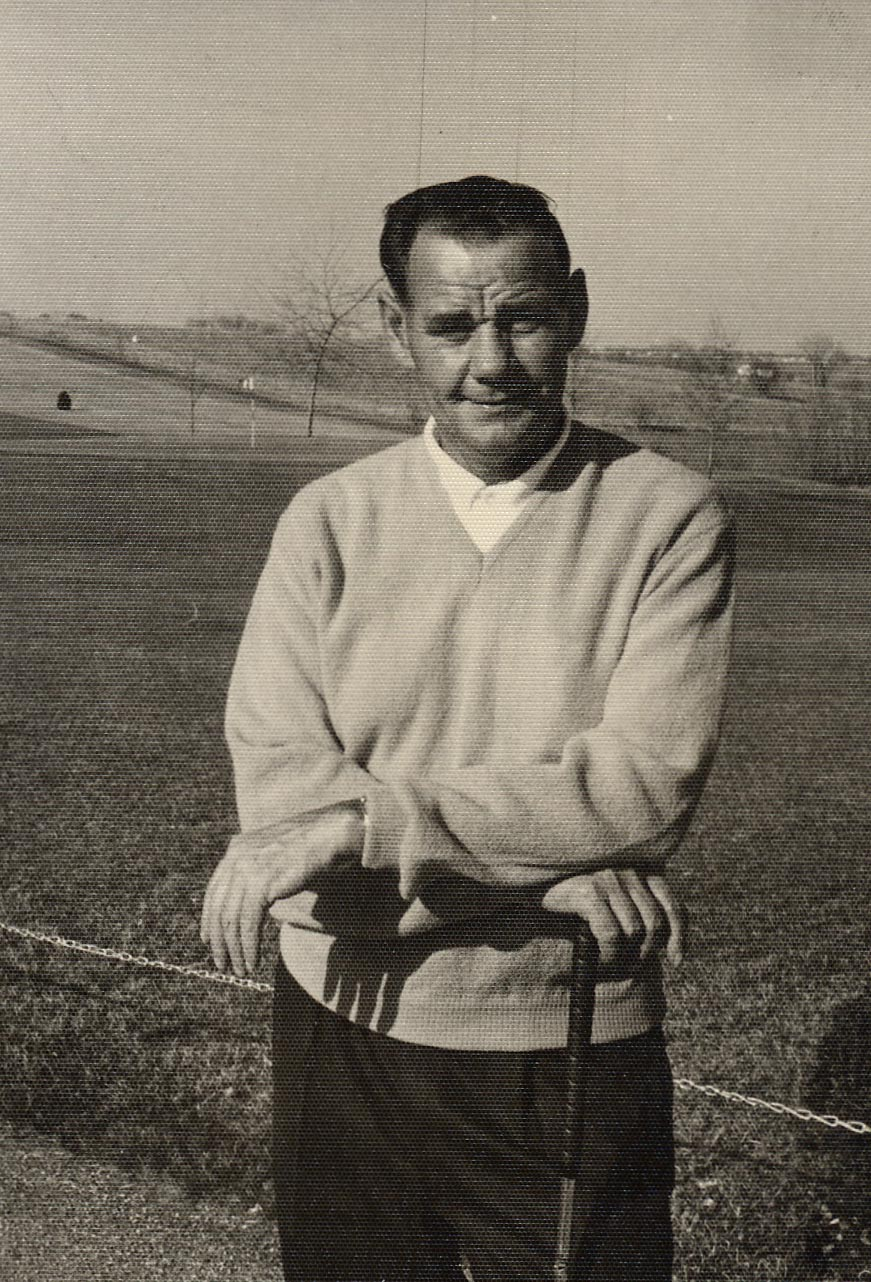
Bob Fry in 1970

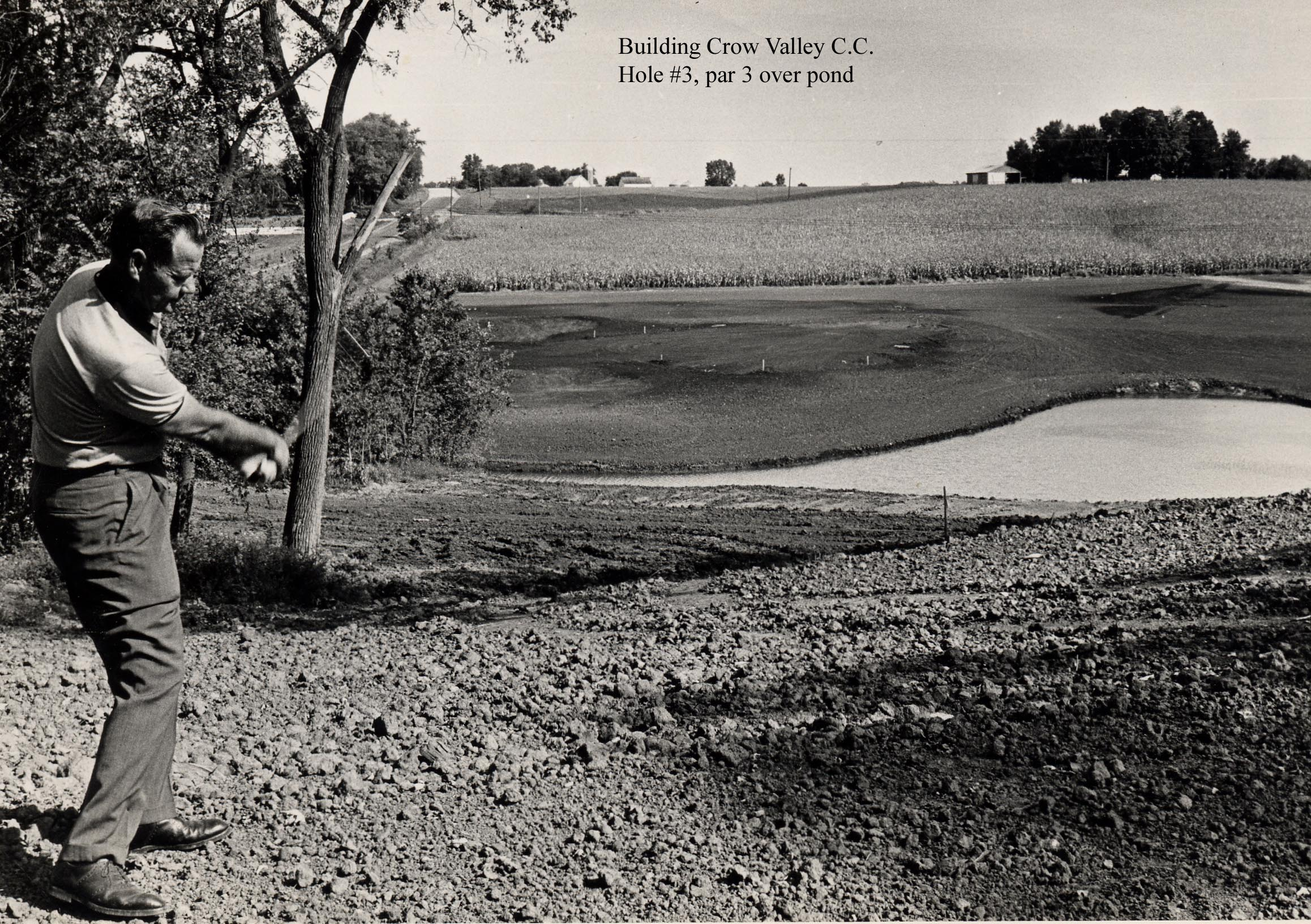
Bob Fry hitting first golf ball at newly built Crow Valley Golf Club

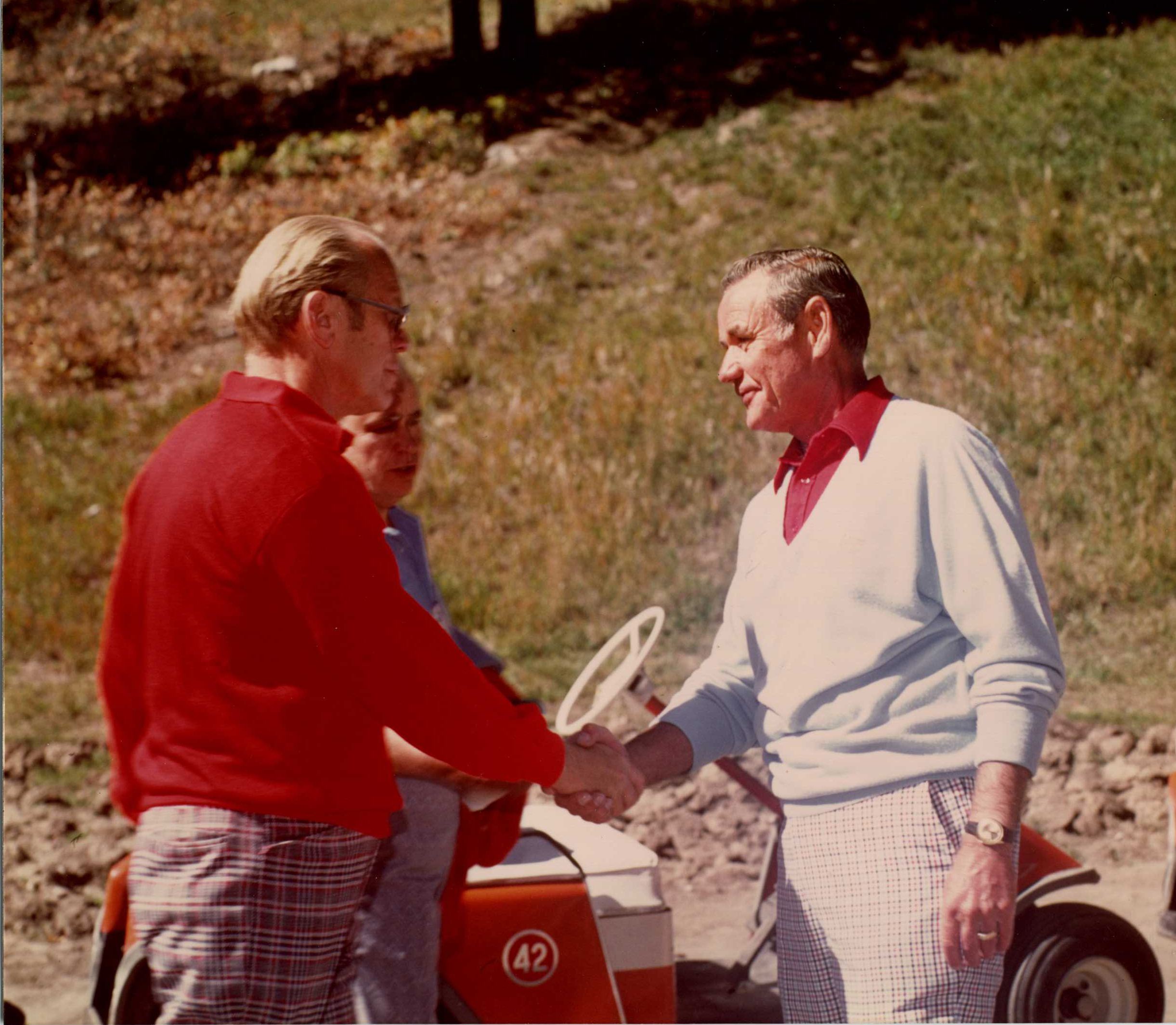
Bob Fry and President Gerald Ford at Tamarron Golf Resort

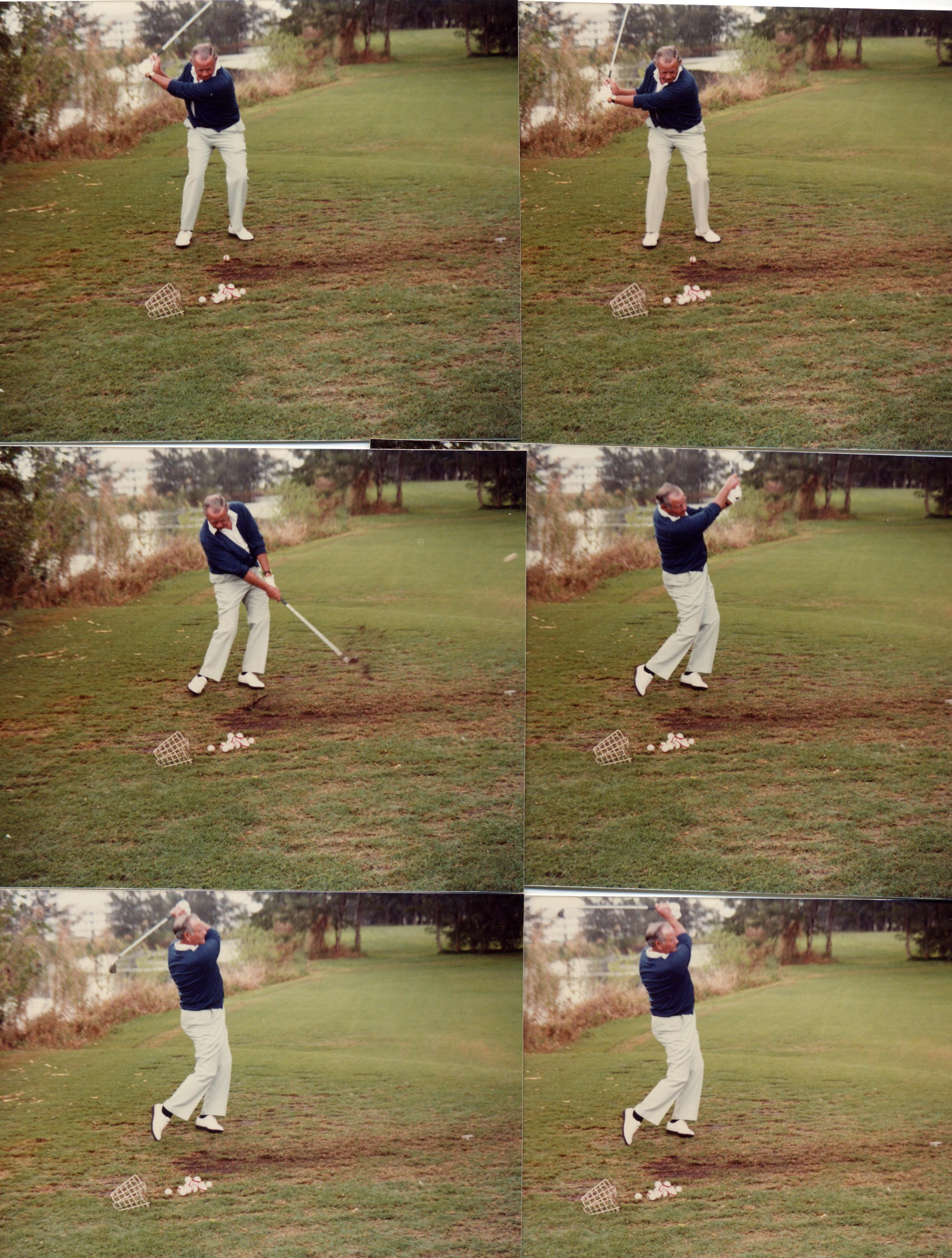
Bob Fry's swing

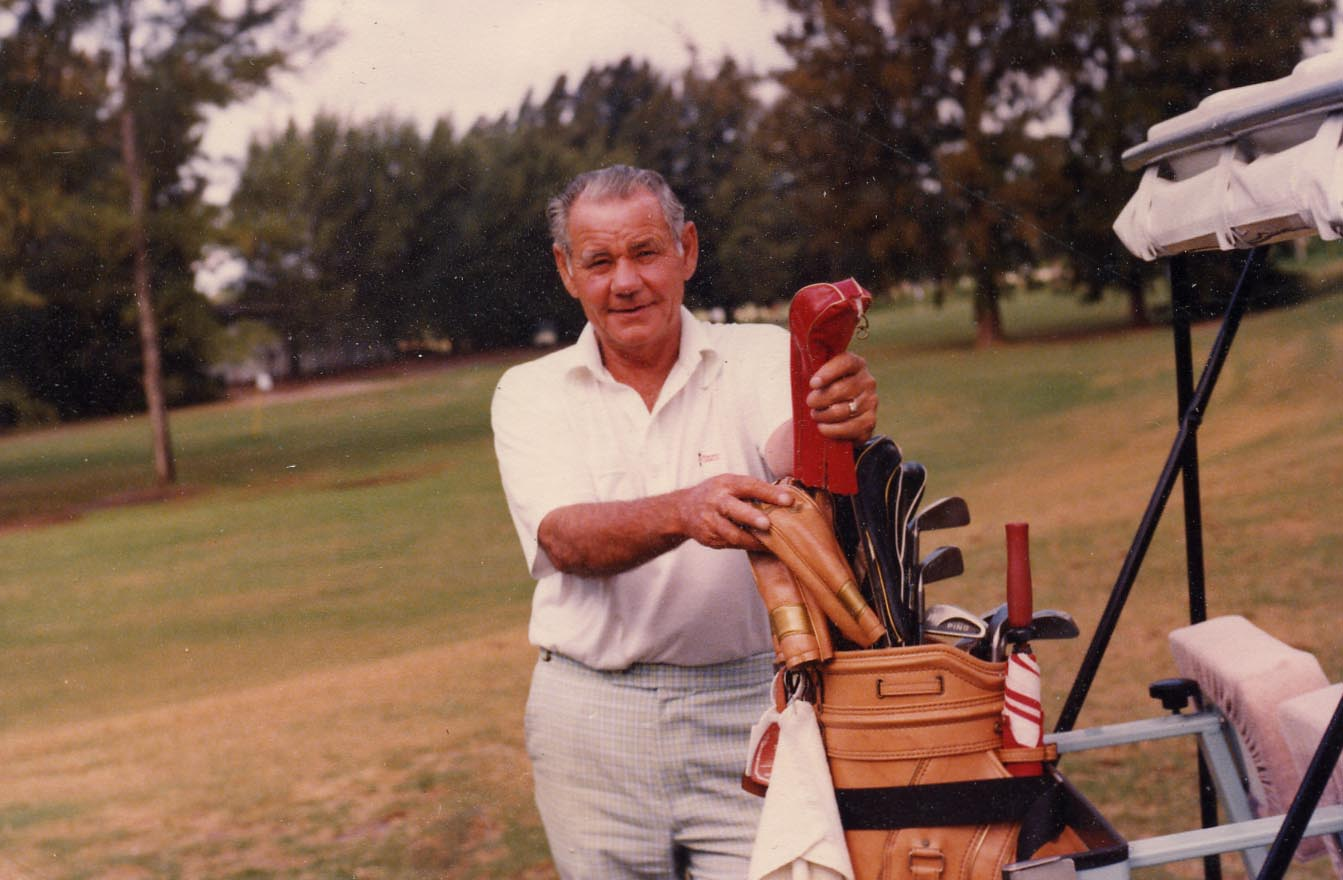
Bob Fry in later years
