= Hall of Fame Tournament =

Golf tournament

The Hall of Fame Tournament was a golf tournament on the Champions Tour played only in 1983. It was played in Pinehurst, North Carolina at the Pinehurst Country Club (No. 2). The purse for the tournament was US$150,000, with $25,000 going to the winner, Rod Funseth.
