= Lindy Miller =

American professional golfer (born 1956)

Personal information
- Nationality: United States
- Born: July 6, 1956 (age 70) Fort Worth, Texas, U.S.
- Height: 6 ft 0 in (1.83 m)
- Weight: 145 lb (66 kg; 10.4 st)

Career
- Sport: Golf
- College: Oklahoma State University
- Turned professional: 1978
- Former tours: PGA Tour; Ben Hogan Tour; Champions Tour
- Professional wins: 7

Number of wins by tour
- Korn Ferry Tour: 1
- Other: 6

Best results in major championships
- Masters Tournament: T16: 1978
- PGA Championship: T57: 1991
- U.S. Open: T54: 1977
- The Open Championship: DNP

Achievements and awards
- Haskins Award: 1978

Lindy Miller (born July 6, 1956) is an American professional golfer who has played on the PGA Tour, Ben Hogan Tour, and Champions Tour.

== Early life ==
Miller was born, raised and has lived most of his life in Fort Worth, Texas. During his teens, he won the 1973 Fort Worth Junior Golf Association Championship.

== Amateur career ==
Miller attended Oklahoma State University. He was a distinguished member of the golf team — an All-American for all four years (1975–1978) and a first-team All-American his last three years and winner of the Haskins Award in 1978. Miller's college teammates included future PGA Tour Champions David Edwards and Bob Tway. Miller and Edwards led the Cowboys to victory at the 1976 and 1978 NCAA Championships. At the 1978 Masters, Miller posted a two-under-par 286 – the lowest total for an amateur since 1961. He turned professional in 1978.

== Professional career ==
Miller played on both the PGA Tour and Ben Hogan Tour during his regular career years. He won the 1990 Ben Hogan Amarillo Open. His best finish on the PGA Tour was second at the 1979 Tallahassee Open.

In 1988, Miller played himself in the film, Dead Solid Perfect, which followed the life of a professional golfer on the PGA Tour.

After retiring as a touring professional, he became director of golf at Fort Worth's Mira Vista Golf Club. In 2007, North Texas PGA Senior Championship, Miller shot a competitive course record 63 in the final round on his way to winning the tournament.

== Awards and honors ==
- Miller was an All-American at Oklahoma State University all four year he attended. In addition, he was a first-team All-American the final three years.
- In 1978, Miller won the Haskins Award, bestowed to the top college golfer in the United States.

== Amateur wins ==
this list is incomplete

- 1973 Fort Worth Junior Golf Association Championship
- 1977 Southern Amateur, Pacific Coast Amateur, Center Invitational
- 1978 Center Invitational

== Professional wins (7) ==
=== Ben Hogan Tour wins (1) ===
No.	Date	Tournament	Winning score	Margin of victory	Runners-up
1	Sep 9, 1990	Ben Hogan Amarillo Open	−10 (66-64-70=200)	2 strokes	(United States) John Daly, (United States) Andy Dillard, (United States) Kevin Leach, (United States) Brian Watts

=== Other wins (6) ===
- 1978 Oklahoma Open
- 1986 Oklahoma Open, Northern Texas PGA Championship
- 1992 Northern Texas PGA Championship
- 2006 Northern Texas PGA Championship
- 2007 FINA North Texas PGA Seniors' Championship

== Results in major championships ==
Tournament	1975	1976	1977	1978	1979
Masters Tournament				T16LA	45
U.S. Open	CUT		T54	CUT	CUT
PGA Championship					

Tournament	1980	1981	1982	1983	1984	1985	1986	1987	1988	1989	1990	1991
Masters Tournament												
U.S. Open		CUT				CUT						
PGA Championship								71		CUT		T57

Note: Miller never played in The Open Championship.

Did not play

LA = low amateur
CUT = missed the half-way cut
"T" indicates a tie for a place

== U.S. national team appearances ==
Amateur

- Walker Cup: 1977 (winners)

== See also ==
- Fall 1978 PGA Tour Qualifying School graduates
- 1982 PGA Tour Qualifying School graduates
