= Iowa PGA Championship =

The Iowa PGA Championship is a golf tournament that is the championship of the Iowa section of the PGA of America. Although the section was founded in 1916, the records of the Iowa section show tournament winners only back to 1953. Bob Fry, holds the record for most victories with five. Richie Karl, who won the B.C. Open on the PGA Tour, won this event four consecutive times, from 1982 to 1985.

== Winners ==
- 2026 Chad Proehl
- 2025 Darin Fisher
- 2024 Jay Giannetto
- 2023 Tracy Vest
- 2022 Jay Giannetto
- 2021 Sean McCarty
- 2020 Chad Proehl
- 2019 Judd Gibb
- 2018 Darin Fisher
- 2017 Chad Proehl
- 2016 Darin Fisher
- 2015 Ryan McClintock
- 2014 Zack Vervaecke
- 2013 Aaron Krueger
- 2012 Sean McCarty
- 2011 Chris Black
- 2010 Chad Proehl
- 2009 Judd Gibb
- 2008 Aaron Krueger
- 2007 Curt Schnell
- 2006 John Bermel
- 2005 Steve Reilly
- 2004 John Bermel
- 2003 Chris Winkel
- 2002 Chris Winkel
- 2001 Kevin DeNike
- 2000 John Bermel
- 1999 Chris Winkel
- 1998 Craig Miller
- 1997 Ken DeNike
- 1996 Curt Schnell
- 1995 Ken Schall
- 1994 Greg Ladehoff
- 1993 John Bermel
- 1992 Lynn Blevins
- 1991 Jack Richards
- 1990 Ken Schall
- 1989 Ken Schall
- 1988 Ken Schall
- 1987 Steve Groves
- 1986 J. D. Turner
- 1985 Richie Karl
- 1984 Richie Karl
- 1983 Richie Karl
- 1982 Richie Karl
- 1981 Bob Moreland
- 1980 Dave Hilgenberg
- 1979 Bill Galloway
- 1978 Craig Bunker
- 1977 Bill Galloway
- 1976 Bob Moreland
- 1975 Hank Stukart
- 1974 Bob Fry
- 1973 Tim Sweborg
- 1972 Hank Stukart
- 1971 Steve Gragg
- 1970 Jack Webb
- 1969 Jack Webb
- 1968 Gary Lockie
- 1967 Larry Crawford
- 1966 Bob Fry
- 1965 Bob Fry
- 1964 Jack Hall
- 1963 Bob Fry
- 1962 Bob Shields
- 1961 Bob Shields
- 1960 Don Palmer
- 1959 Bob Fry
- 1958 Jack Jones
- 1957 Don Palmer
- 1956 Don Palmer
- 1955 Don Palmer
- 1954 Joe Brown
- 1953 Frank Bubany
