= Lyn Lott =

American golfer (1950–2018)

Personal information
- Full name: Clinton Lynwood Lott III
- Nationality: United States
- Born: April 9, 1950 Douglas, Georgia, U.S.
- Died: March 22, 2018 (aged 67) Atlanta, Georgia, U.S.
- Height: 6 ft 1 in (1.85 m)
- Weight: 185 lb (84 kg; 13.2 st)

Career
- Sport: Golf
- College: University of Georgia
- Turned professional: 1973
- Former tour: PGA Tour
- Professional wins: 1

Best results in major championships
- Masters Tournament: 41st: 1978
- PGA Championship: T25: 1977
- U.S. Open: T7: 1977
- The Open Championship: DNP

Clinton Lynwood Lott III (April 9, 1950 – March 22, 2018) was an American professional golfer.

== Early life and amateur career ==
Lott was born in Douglas, Georgia. He won several amateur golf tournaments in Georgia including the Georgia State Junior Amateur, Georgia State Amateur, and Georgia Open, as a 17-year-old amateur. He played college golf at the University of Georgia where he was a two-time All-American. During his time at UGA, the team won four consecutive Southeastern Conference titles and Lott won two individual events.

== Professional career ==
Lott played on the PGA Tour from 1974 to 1984. His best finishes were three third-place finishes: 3rd at the 1976 Canadian Open, T-3 at the 1977 Byron Nelson Golf Classic, and T-3 at the 1981 Greater Milwaukee Open. He twice finished in the top-10 in a major: T-7 at the 1977 U.S. Open and T-8 at the 1976 U.S. Open.

== Personal life ==
Lott died March 22, 2018, following complications from surgery to remove a brain tumor in October 2017.

== Awards and honors ==
- In 1998, Lott was inducted into the Georgia Sports Hall of Fame.
- In 2005, he was inducted into the Georgia Golf Hall of Fame.

== Amateur wins ==
- 1967 Georgia State Junior Amateur
- 196? Southeastern Junior Amateur
- 19?? Georgia State Jaycees Championship
- 1972 Georgia State Amateur
- 19?? Future Masters

== Professional wins ==
- 1967 Georgia Open (as an amateur)

== Results in major championships ==
Tournament	1975	1976	1977	1978	1979	1980	1981	1982	1983
Masters Tournament			T46	41					CUT
U.S. Open	CUT	T8	T7	CUT		CUT		T12	CUT
PGA Championship		64	T25					T54	

Note: Lott never played in The Open Championship.

Top 10
Did not play

CUT = missed the half-way cut
"T" = tied

== See also ==
- 1973 PGA Tour Qualifying School graduates
- 1982 PGA Tour Qualifying School graduates
- 1983 PGA Tour Qualifying School graduates
