= Mac McLendon =

American professional golfer (1945–2022)

Personal information
- Full name: Benson Rayfield McLendon Jr.
- Nationality: United States
- Born: August 10, 1945 Atlanta, Georgia, U.S.
- Died: July 4, 2022 (aged 76)
- Height: 6 ft 2.5 in (1.89 m)
- Weight: 185 lb (84 kg; 13.2 st)

Career
- Sport: Golf
- College: Louisiana State University
- Turned professional: 1968
- Former tour: PGA Tour
- Professional wins: 6

Number of wins by tour
- PGA Tour: 4
- Other: 2

Best results in major championships
- Masters Tournament: T29: 1978
- PGA Championship: T25: 1975
- U.S. Open: T22: 1968
- The Open Championship: DNP

Benson Rayfield McLendon Jr. (August 10, 1945 – July 4, 2022) was an American professional golfer who played on the PGA Tour in the 1960s and 1970s.

== Career ==
In 1945, McLendon was born in Atlanta, Georgia. He graduated from Louisiana State University in Baton Rouge and was a member of the golf team.

McLendon turned pro in 1968 and won the first event he entered, the Magnolia State Classic. He won four PGA Tour events during his career. His best finish in a major championship was T22 at the 1968 U.S. Open. He retired from the PGA Tour in 1980.

McLendon resided in Birmingham, Alabama. He died on July 4, 2022, at age 76.

== Amateur wins ==
- 1965 SEC Championship (individual)
- 1966 SEC Championship (individual)
- 1967 SEC Championship (individual)

== Professional wins (6) ==
=== PGA Tour wins (4) ===
| No. | Date | Tournament | Winning score | Margin of victory | Runner(s)-up |
|---|---|---|---|---|---|
| 1 | Nov 3, 1974 | Walt Disney World National Team Championship (with (United States) Hubert Green) | −33 (64-64-63-64=255) | 1 stroke | (United States) Sam Snead and (United States) J. C. Snead, (United States) Ed Sneed and (United States) Bert Yancey |
| 2 | Oct 24, 1976 | Southern Open | −6 (68-69-69-68=274) | 2 strokes | (United States) Hubert Green |
| 3 | Mar 6, 1978 | Florida Citrus Open | −17 (69-65-69-68=271) | 2 strokes | (Australia) David Graham |
| 4 | Oct 29, 1978 | Pensacola Open | −16 (65-67-67-73=272) | Playoff | (United States) Mike Reid |

PGA Tour playoff record (1–0)

| No. | Year | Tournament | Opponent | Result |
|---|---|---|---|---|
| 1 | 1978 | Pensacola Open | (United States) Mike Reid | Won with par on first extra hole |

=== Other (2) ===
- 1968 Magnolia State Classic
- 1975 Waterloo Open Golf Classic

== Results in major championships ==
| Tournament | 1968 | 1969 | 1970 | 1971 | 1972 | 1973 | 1974 | 1975 | 1976 | 1977 | 1978 | 1979 |
|---|---|---|---|---|---|---|---|---|---|---|---|---|
| Masters Tournament | | 45 | | | | | | CUT | | 45 | T29 | CUT |
| U.S. Open | T22 | | | | | | | CUT | | | T35 | 62 |
| PGA Championship | | T35 | | | CUT | | | T25 | T65 | T48 | | CUT |

Note: McLendon never played in The Open Championship.

Did not play

CUT = missed the half-way cut
"T" = tied
