= Richie Karl =

American golfer (born 1944)

Personal information
- Full name: Richard Karl
- Nationality: United States
- Born: September 28, 1944 (age 82) Johnson City, New York, U.S.
- Height: 5 ft 11 in (1.80 m)
- Weight: 170 lb (77 kg; 12 st)

Career
- Sport: Golf
- College: Florida State University
- Turned professional: 1968
- Former tours: PGA Tour; Champions Tour
- Professional wins: 6

Number of wins by tour
- PGA Tour: 1
- Other: 5

Best results in major championships
- Masters Tournament: 46th: 1975
- PGA Championship: T55: 1974
- U.S. Open: CUT: 1980
- The Open Championship: DNP

Richard Karl (born September 28, 1944) is an American professional golfer who is best known as the last golf club professional to win an official PGA Tour event.

== Early life and amateur career ==
Karl was born in Johnson City, New York. He played college golf at Florida State University. He won the Alaska State Amateur twice while stationed in the Army there.

== Professional career ==
In 1968, Karl turned professional. He won the 1974 B.C. Open by sinking a 35-foot putt on the first hole in a playoff with Bruce Crampton. Karl, who worked at the En-Joie Golf Club in Endicott, New York where the B.C. Open was played and lived along the 10th fairway, is the last club professional to win on the PGA Tour.

Karl played briefly on the Senior PGA Tour starting after he turned 50 in September 1994. His best finish in this venue was a T-5 at the ACE Group Classic. In 2007, Karl played as a sponsor's exemption in the inaugural Dick's Sporting Goods Open, a Champions Tour event played on his home course.

== Amateur wins ==
- 1965 Alaska State Amateur
- 1966 Alaska State Amateur

== Professional wins (6) ==
=== PGA Tour wins (1) ===
No.	Date	Tournament	Winning score	Margin of victory	Runner-up
1	Jul 21, 1974	B.C. Open	−11 (70-67-68-68=273)	Playoff	(Australia) Bruce Crampton

PGA Tour playoff record (1–0)

No.	Year	Tournament	Opponent	Result
1	1974	B.C. Open	(Australia) Bruce Crampton	Won with birdie on first extra hole

=== Other wins (5) ===
- 1972 Yuma Open (PGA Tour satellite event)
- 1982 Iowa PGA Championship
- 1983 Iowa PGA Championship
- 1984 Iowa PGA Championship
- 1985 Iowa PGA Championship

== See also ==
- 1970 PGA Tour Qualifying School graduates
