= Rod Funseth =

American professional golfer (1933–1985)

Personal information
- Full name: James Rodney Funseth
- Nationality: United States
- Born: April 3, 1933 Spokane, Washington, U.S.
- Died: September 9, 1985 (aged 52) Napa, California, U.S.
- Height: 5 ft 10 in (1.78 m)
- Weight: 170 lb (77 kg; 12 st)
- Spouses: Sandi (Hawkins) Funseth (m. 1965–1985, his death)
- Children: 2

Career
- Sport: Golf
- College: University of Idaho (briefly attended)
- Turned professional: 1956
- Former tours: PGA Tour (1962–79); Senior PGA Tour (1983–84)
- Professional wins: 9

Number of wins by tour
- PGA Tour: 3
- PGA Tour Champions: 1
- Other: 5

Best results in major championships
- Masters Tournament: T2: 1978
- PGA Championship: T8: 1965
- U.S. Open: T10: 1977
- The Open Championship: DNP

James Rodney Funseth (April 3, 1933 – September 9, 1985) was an American professional golfer who played on the PGA Tour and the Senior PGA Tour (now PGA Tour Champions).

Amiable and low-key but less than confident, Funseth was one of longest hitters and fastest players of his era, but better known for a pessimistic attitude toward his game, He claimed that his "I'll never be able to make that shot" mental attitude of lowered expectations helped motivate him to play better. He was especially self-deprecating on his lack of putting prowess.

== Early life and amateur career ==
Funseth was born and raised in Spokane, Washington. Funseth's father was a men's clothing store operator and salesman, born in Sweden. Rod competed with his older brother Carl for city junior titles and graduated from North Central High School in 1951. Funseth briefly attended the University of Idaho in Moscow to study civil engineering, but did not graduate. He was a member of Sigma Alpha Epsilon fraternity.

Funseth returned to Spokane after a semester and worked in various jobs in Washington while competing as an amateur. One of these brief jobs was as a civilian draftsman at the Bremerton Navy Yard, west of Seattle. He won the British Columbia Amateur in 1956.

== Professional career ==
In the fall of 1956, he turned pro. In 1959, Funseth became an assistant pro under Masters champion Claude Harmon back east at Winged Foot, north of New York City and later at Thunderbird in Palm Springs. Funseth entered a handful of tour events in 1962, and received sponsorship of $800 per month from Spokane's Athletic Round Table (ART) in 1963 to allow him to play full-time. He played out of Esmeralda, a municipal course in east Spokane built in the mid-1950s. It was initially funded by ART (land and clubhouse) and was named for the group's mascot, a grinning cartoon mare. Funseth had the smiling horse insignia on his tour bag for several years, which invited frequent inquisitions. Keeping meticulous records of all his earnings, he reimbursed the ART to the last dollar.

=== PGA Tour ===
Funseth played full-time on the PGA Tour from 1963 through 1979 and won three tour events. The first was the Phoenix Open Invitational in 1965 at the Arizona Country Club, which came a week after losing a final round lead at the Bob Hope Classic in Palm Springs. Funseth's second win came eight years later at the Glen Campbell-Los Angeles Open, the season-opener in 1973 at Riviera. His final PGA Tour win came at age 45 in 1978 at the Sammy Davis Jr.-Greater Hartford Open, which paid for his horse barn.

His best finish in a major championship was just months earlier, a tie for second at the Masters, one stroke behind Gary Player. Funseth was in the last pairing on Sunday and had a three-under 69, but Player carded a record-tying 64 (−8) for his third green jacket. Funseth birdied the par-5 15th hole, but parred the last three, with a putt left on the lip at the 16th and another narrowly missing on the final hole to force a playoff.

Funseth was known on tour as an avid fisherman, a passion shared by Johnny Miller, his next-door neighbor in Napa, and Jack Nicklaus. The three played in an exhibition golf match in Spokane in 1975, a rarity for Nicklaus at the time.

=== Senior career ===
Funseth became eligible to play on the Senior PGA Tour after reaching age 50 in April 1983. He had a great deal of immediate success, winning the unofficial Liberty Mutual Legends of Golf (team event with Roberto De Vicenzo) in early May, and a nine-stroke victory at his tour debut at the Hall of Fame Tournament three weeks later in North Carolina at Pinehurst No. 2. Funseth also finished second to Billy Casper in a sudden-death playoff at the U.S. Senior Open in July.

== Personal life ==
Funseth was married to Sandi (née Hawkins), a former competitive water skier from Redwood City. They had two children: Lisa and Mark. He met Sandi during the rainy Crosby event at Pebble Beach in January 1965, when she was a spectator in a long leg cast (from a snow skiing accident) and had been offered shelter in a tournament tent; they were married later that year.

== Death ==
Funseth's career on the over-50 tour was cut short by terminal cancer, attributed to exposure to asbestos at the navy yard in Bremerton in his late teens. Told by physicians in January 1984 that he had four months to live, Funseth continued to play well on tour, and returned to defend his team title at the Liberty Mutual Legends in late April. He competed in 17 events in 1984, with three runner-up finishes and nine in the top-10, despite losing weight and strength. Funseth won a match play event in October in Maine, besting Bob Toski 2-up in the final for a winner's share of $30,000. Although a non-tour event, it included most of the top senior players of the day.

Funseth's condition declined in 1985 as his body weight was reduced to 100 lb (45 kg) by September and his breathing assisted with oxygen. He died at age 52 at his home in Napa, California, beside the 12th hole of the Silverado Country Club, next door to friend Johnny Miller.

== Awards and honors ==
In 1999, Funseth was inducted posthumously into the State of Washington Sports Hall of Fame.

== Amateur wins ==
- 1956 British Columbia Amateur

== Professional wins (8) ==
=== PGA Tour wins (3) ===
| No. | Date | Tournament | Winning score | To par | Margin of victory | Runner(s)-up |
|---|---|---|---|---|---|---|
| 1 | Feb 14, 1965 | Phoenix Open Invitational | 71-68-68-67=274 | −14 | 3 strokes | (United States) Bert Yancey |
| 2 | Jan 7, 1973 | Glen Campbell-Los Angeles Open | 73-69-65-69=276 | −8 | 2 strokes | (United States) Don Bies, (Australia) David Graham, (United States) Tom Weiskopf |
| 3 | Jul 30, 1978 | Sammy Davis Jr.-Greater Hartford Open | 65-67-68-64=264 | −20 | 6 strokes | (United States) Dale Douglass, (United States) Lee Elder, (United States) Billy Kratzert |

PGA Tour playoff record (0–1)

| No. | Year | Tournament | Opponents | Result |
|---|---|---|---|---|
| 1 | 1971 | Greater Greensboro Open | (United States) Buddy Allin, (United States) Dave Eichelberger | Allin won with birdie on first extra hole |

=== Other wins (3) ===
- 1964 Northwest Open
- 1973 Confidence Open
- 1977 Spalding Invitational

=== Senior PGA Tour wins (1) ===
| No. | Date | Tournament | Winning score | To par | Margin of victory | Runner-up |
|---|---|---|---|---|---|---|
| 1 | May 22, 1983 | Hall of Fame Tournament | 66-67-65=198 | −18 | 9 strokes | (United States) Charlie Sifford |

Senior PGA Tour playoff record (0–1)

| No. | Year | Tournament | Opponent | Result |
|---|---|---|---|---|
| 1 | 1983 | U.S. Senior Open | (United States) Billy Casper | Lost to birdie on first extra hole after 18-hole playoff; Casper: +4 (75), Funseth: +4 (75) |

=== Other senior wins (2) ===
- 1983 Liberty Mutual Legends of Golf (with Roberto De Vicenzo)
- 1984 Unionmutual Seniors Golf Classic (match play)

== Results in major championships ==
| Tournament | 1965 | 1966 | 1967 | 1968 | 1969 | 1970 | 1971 | 1972 | 1973 |
|---|---|---|---|---|---|---|---|---|---|
| Masters Tournament | | T33 | T31 | | CUT | | | | T37 |
| U.S. Open | | T13 | 37 | T16 | CUT | | CUT | T25 | T20 |
| PGA Championship | T8 | T43 | T28 | | | T35 | T29 | T51 | T35 |

| Tournament | 1974 | 1975 | 1976 | 1977 | 1978 | 1979 | 1980 | 1981 | 1982 |
|---|---|---|---|---|---|---|---|---|---|
| Masters Tournament | | | | T14 | T2 | 44 | | | |
| U.S. Open | T30 | | T11 | T10 | CUT | T48 | | | CUT |
| PGA Championship | | | T43 | | T42 | T23 | | | |

Note: Funseth never played in The Open Championship.

Top 10
Did not play

CUT = missed the half-way cut
"T" indicates a tie for a place

=== Summary ===
| Tournament | Wins | 2nd | 3rd | Top-5 | Top-10 | Top-25 | Events | Cuts made |
|---|---|---|---|---|---|---|---|---|
| Masters Tournament | 0 | 1 | 0 | 1 | 1 | 2 | 7 | 6 |
| U.S. Open | 0 | 0 | 0 | 0 | 1 | 6 | 13 | 9 |
| The Open Championship | 0 | 0 | 0 | 0 | 0 | 0 | 0 | 0 |
| PGA Championship | 0 | 0 | 0 | 0 | 1 | 2 | 10 | 10 |
| Totals | 0 | 1 | 0 | 1 | 3 | 10 | 30 | 25 |

- Most consecutive cuts made – 11 (1972 U.S. Open – 1978 Masters)
- Longest streak of top-10s – 2 (1977 U.S. Open – 1978 Masters)
