= Rik Massengale =

American golfer

Personal information
- Full name: Rik Massengale
- Nationality: United States
- Born: February 6, 1947 (age 79) Jacksboro, Texas, U.S.
- Height: 5 ft 11 in (1.80 m)
- Weight: 170 lb (77 kg; 12 st)

Career
- Sport: Golf
- College: University of Texas
- Turned professional: 1969
- Former tours: PGA Tour; Champions Tour
- Professional wins: 3

Number of wins by tour
- PGA Tour: 3

Best results in major championships
- Masters Tournament: T3: 1977
- PGA Championship: T30: 1976
- U.S. Open: T14: 1975
- The Open Championship: T26: 1977

Rik Massengale (born February 6, 1947) is an American former professional golfer who played full-time on the PGA Tour from 1970–1982.

== Early life and amateur career ==
Massengale was born and raised in Jacksboro, Texas. He developed an interest in golf as a result of his older brother, Don, being a professional golfer. He attended the University of Texas at Austin and was a member of the golf team from 1965 to 1969. Massengale was known as a "wild man" at fraternity parties in college; however, he changed his ways and became a born-again Christian in 1975.

== Professional career ==
In 1969, Massengale turned pro. He was successful at 1970 PGA Tour Qualifying School joined the PGA Tour shortly thereafter.

Massengale won three events on the PGA Tour during the mid-1970s. His first win was at the 1975 Tallahassee Open. Massengale's second came a year later at the Sammy Davis Jr.-Greater Hartford Open. The biggest win of his career came in 1977 at the Bob Hope Desert Classic; he established a new tournament record (337) breaking Arnold Palmer's 17-year-old record by one stroke. Massengale shot a blistering 64 on the first day and led this event wire-to-wire. He led wire to wire in all three of his PGA Tour victories. His best career year was 1977 when he had seven top-10 finishes, $126,736 in earnings, and finished 13th on the money list. His best finish in a major was a T-3 at the 1977 Masters.

A back injury led Massengale to retire from the PGA Tour in 1983. He served as National Director for College Golf Fellowship for 15 years. After turning 50 in 1997, he played in a limited number of tournaments on the Senior PGA Tour. His best finish in this venue was a T-6 at the 1997 Cadillac NFL Golf Classic.

Massengale is a commercial real estate broker in the Dallas metroplex.

== Personal life ==
He married Cindy, in 1969. They have four children. They live in the Dallas suburb of Frisco, Texas.

He is chairman of the Board of Chin Community Ministry, a refugee ministry in the Dallas area and serves on the board of Search Ministries Collin County.

== Amateur wins ==
- 1964 Texas-Oklahoma Junior Golf Tournament
- 1967 Cotton States Invitational
- 1968 Western Amateur, Southwest Conference Championship (individual medalist)

== Professional wins (3) ==
=== PGA Tour wins (3) ===
No.	Date	Tournament	Winning score	Margin of victory	Runner(s)-up
1	Apr 27, 1975	Tallahassee Open	−14 (67-67-68-72=274)	2 strokes	(United States) Spike Kelley, (United States) Bert Yancey
2	Aug 22, 1976	Sammy Davis Jr.-Greater Hartford Open	−18 (65-65-70-66=266)	2 strokes	(United States) Al Geiberger, (United States) J. C. Snead
3	Feb 13, 1977	Bob Hope Desert Classic	−23 (64-66-70-70-67=337)	6 strokes	(United States) Bruce Lietzke

PGA Tour playoff record (0–1)

No.	Year	Tournament	Opponent	Result
1	1975	Sahara Invitational	(United States) Dave Hill	Lost to par on first extra hole

== Results in major championships ==
Tournament	1969	1970	1971	1972	1973	1974	1975	1976	1977	1978	1979	1980	1981
Masters Tournament	CUT							T23	T3	CUT			
U.S. Open				CUT		T30	T14	T33	T39	CUT	CUT		T26
The Open Championship									T26				
PGA Championship							CUT	T30	T36	CUT		WD	

Top 10
Did not play

WD = withdrew
CUT = missed the half-way cut
"T" indicates a tie for a place

== See also ==
- 1970 PGA Tour Qualifying School graduates
