= Dwight Nevil =

American golfer (born 1944)

Personal information
- Nationality: United States
- Born: August 25, 1944 (age 82) Altus, Oklahoma, U.S.
- Height: 5 ft 8 in (1.73 m)
- Weight: 178 lb (81 kg; 12.7 st)

Career
- Sport: Golf
- College: North Texas State University
- Turned professional: 1970
- Former tours: PGA Tour; Champions Tour
- Professional wins: 3

Best results in major championships
- Masters Tournament: DNP
- PGA Championship: T53: 1974
- U.S. Open: 69th: 1972
- The Open Championship: DNP

Dwight Nevil (born August 25, 1944) is an American professional golfer who played on the PGA Tour in the 1970s and later played on the Champions Tour.

== Career ==
In 1944, Nevil was born in Altus, Oklahoma.

Nevil played on the PGA Tour full-time from 1971–1977. He never won an official PGA Tour event; however, among his dozen top-10 finishes were a pair of consecutive runner-up finishes in September 1973 at the Quad Cities Open and the B.C. Open. He won the unofficial Magnolia State Classic in 1973 and 1974, and is the only player ever to win this event in two straight years. His best finish in a major was T-53 at the 1974 PGA Championship. Poor health (irregular heartbeat) and the failed treatments that tried to correct it ruined his putting stroke and forced him to retire from the Tour before the 1978 season.

Upon reaching the age of 50 in August 1994, Nevil began play on the Senior PGA Tour and later, the Sunbelt Senior Tour. His best finish in a Champions Tour event is a T-30 at the 2001 State Farm Senior Classic. Today, Nevil works in the golf equipment and outfitting industry and is based in Mineola, Texas.

== Professional wins ==
- 1973 Magnolia State Classic
- 1974 Magnolia State Classic
- 1984 Northern Texas PGA Championship

== See also ==
- 1970 PGA Tour Qualifying School graduates
