= Terry Diehl =

American professional golfer (born 1949)

Personal information
- Full name: Terry J. Diehl
- Nationality: United States
- Born: November 9, 1949 (age 76) Rochester, New York, U.S.
- Height: 6 ft 0 in (1.83 m)
- Weight: 200 lb (91 kg; 14 st)

Career
- Sport: Golf
- College: University of Georgia
- Turned professional: 1972
- Former tour: PGA Tour
- Professional wins: 1

Number of wins by tour
- PGA Tour: 1

Best results in major championships
- Masters Tournament: T32: 1978
- PGA Championship: T10: 1980
- U.S. Open: T7: 1977
- The Open Championship: DNP

Terry J. Diehl (born November 9, 1949) is an American professional golfer who played on the PGA Tour from 1973 to 1983.

== Early life and amateur career ==
Diehl was born and raised in Rochester, New York. At the age of 15, he won the international long drive competition when he hit a ball 340 yards. He attended the University of Georgia from 1968 to 1971 and was a member of the golf team, an All-American in 1969.

== Professional career ==
Diehl had more than 20 top-10 finishes in PGA Tour events including a win at the 1974 San Antonio Texas Open; he shot a 19-under-par 269 and won by one stroke over Mike Hill. He finished solo second to Lee Trevino at the same tournament in 1980. Diehl finished the 1976 IVB-Bicentennial Golf Classic tied for first in regulation; however, he lost that tournament to Tom Kite on the fifth extra hole of a playoff handing Kite his first of 19 PGA Tour wins. Diehl's best finish in a major championship was a T-7 at the 1977 U.S. Open.

Diehl left the PGA Tour after the 1983 season to pursue other endeavors that included a stint in the PGA Tour's marketing department, a commentator for ESPN, a club pro, a stockbroker with Prudential Securities and a senior vice president in portfolio management at Morgan Stanley in Rochester.

== Personal life ==
Diehl decided to forgo a chance to play on the Champions Tour after reaching the age of 50, when he and wife Laura decided to adopt a daughter from China named Alexandra. He also has four grown sons named Matt, John, Colin and Graham.

== Amateur wins ==
- 1967 International Junior Masters (individual medalist)
- 1969 Monroe Invitational, New York State Amateur
- 1971 Monroe Invitational

== Professional wins (1) ==
=== PGA Tour wins (1) ===
No.	Date	Tournament	Winning score	Margin of victory	Runner-up
1	Oct 20, 1974	San Antonio Texas Open	−19 (68-65-65-71=269)	1 stroke	(United States) Mike Hill

PGA Tour playoff record (0–1)

No.	Year	Tournament	Opponent	Result
1	1976	IVB-Bicentennial Golf Classic	(United States) Tom Kite	Lost to par on fifth extra hole

== Results in major championships ==
Tournament	1970	1971	1972	1973	1974	1975	1976	1977	1978	1979	1980	1981	1982
Masters Tournament						CUT			T32				
U.S. Open	CUT						T33	T7	CUT			CUT	T37
PGA Championship											T10	T39	

Note: Diehl never played in The Open Championship.

Top 10
Did not play

CUT = missed the half-way cut
"T" indicates a tie for a place

== See also ==
- 1973 PGA Tour Qualifying School graduates
