= 1980 Masters Tournament =

- Front cover of the 1980 Masters Guide

Tournament information
- Dates: April 10–13, 1980
- Location: Augusta, Georgia; 33.503°N 82.020°W
- Course: Augusta National Golf Club
- Organized by: Augusta National Golf Club
- Tour: PGA Tour

Statistics
- Par: 72
- Length: 7,040 yards (6,437 m)
- Field: 91 players, 52 after cut
- Cut: 146 (+2)
- Prize fund: $359,949
- Winner's share: $55,000

Champion
- (Spain) Seve Ballesteros
- 275 (−13)

Location map
- Location in the United States Location in Georgia

The 1980 Masters Tournament was the 44th Masters Tournament, held April 10–13 at Augusta National Golf Club in Augusta, Georgia.

Seve Ballesteros, age 23, won his first Masters and second major championship title, four strokes ahead of runners-up Jack Newton and Gibby Gilbert. Ballesteros had a seven stroke lead after 54 holes and extended it to ten strokes after the front nine of the final round at 16-under-par, eyeing the Masters record of 271 (−17) set by Jack Nicklaus in 1965 (and equaled by Raymond Floyd in 1976). A new record (of 270 or lower) was to be rewarded with a $50,000 bonus from Golf magazine. An hour later, after he found the water at 12 and 13 at Amen Corner, the lead had been reduced to two. Ballesteros regrouped with a birdie at 15 and parred the rest to shoot even-par 72 for the round and held on for the victory.

Well back in the field on Sunday, Nicklaus, age 40, was paired with Arnold Palmer, age 50, which drew large galleries. Palmer shot 69 to finish at even par and T24, Nicklaus had 73 to finish at 291 (+3) and T33. It was their first pairing at Augusta in five years and the first time Palmer had finished higher than Nicklaus there since 1967. Nicklaus regrouped and won two majors in 1980, the U.S. Open and the PGA Championship and was the runner-up the following April.

Ballesteros, of Spain, was the first winner of the Masters from Europe, and won a second green jacket in 1983.

This was the final Masters with Bermuda and ryegrass greens, which were replaced with bentgrass following this tournament.

== Field ==
1. Masters champions

Tommy Aaron, George Archer, Gay Brewer, Billy Casper, Charles Coody, Raymond Floyd (8,11), Doug Ford, Bob Goalby, Jack Nicklaus (3,4,8,9), Arnold Palmer, Gary Player (8,9), Sam Snead, Art Wall Jr., Tom Watson (3,8,11), Fuzzy Zoeller (8,12)

- Jack Burke Jr., Jimmy Demaret, Ralph Guldahl, Claude Harmon, Ben Hogan, Herman Keiser, Cary Middlecoff, Byron Nelson, Henry Picard, and Gene Sarazen did not play.

The following categories only apply to Americans

2. U.S. Open champions (last five years)

Lou Graham (8,11), Hubert Green (8,11,12), Hale Irwin (8,9,12), Andy North (8,9), Jerry Pate (9,10)

3. The Open champions (last five years)

Johnny Miller (11)

4. PGA champions (last five years)

John Mahaffey (12), Dave Stockton, Lanny Wadkins (8,12)

5. 1979 U.S. Amateur semi-finalists

Cecil Ingram III (a), Mark O'Meara (6,a), Joey Rassett (a)

- John Cook (6) forfeited his exemption by turning professional.

6. Previous two U.S. Amateur and Amateur champions

Jay Sigel (7,a)

7. Members of the 1979 U.S. Walker Cup team

Doug Clarke (a), Doug Fischesser (a), Mike Gove (a), Jim Holtgrieve (a), Griff Moody (a), Hal Sutton (a), Marty West (a)

- Scott Hoch and Mike Peck forfeited their exemptions by turning professional.

8. Top 24 players and ties from the 1979 Masters Tournament

Miller Barber, Bobby Clampett (a), Lee Elder (9,12), Joe Inman, Tom Kite (12), Billy Kratzert, Bruce Lietzke, Gene Littler, Artie McNickle, Jim Simons (9), J. C. Snead, Ed Sneed (9), Craig Stadler (11), Leonard Thompson, Lee Trevino (11,12)

9. Top 16 players and ties from the 1979 U.S. Open

Ben Crenshaw (10,11), Keith Fergus, Bob Gilder, Larry Nelson (11,12), Calvin Peete (11), Tom Purtzer, Bill Rogers, Tom Weiskopf

10. Top eight players and ties from 1979 PGA Championship

Rex Caldwell, Gibby Gilbert, Jay Haas, Don January, Ron Streck, Howard Twitty (11)

11. Winners of PGA Tour events since the previous Masters

Andy Bean (12), George Burns, Jim Colbert, Dave Eichelberger, Ed Fiori, John Fought, Al Geiberger, Lon Hinkle, Wayne Levi, Jerry McGee, Jeff Mitchell, Gil Morgan (12), Jack Renner, Chi-Chi Rodríguez, Curtis Strange, Doug Tewell, D. A. Weibring

12. Members of the U.S. 1979 Ryder Cup team

Mark Hayes

13. Foreign invitations

Isao Aoki, Seve Ballesteros (3,8), David Graham (4,9,10), Mark James, Sandy Lyle, Graham Marsh (9), Peter McEvoy (6,a), Tōru Nakamura, Jack Newton (8)

- Numbers in brackets indicate categories that the player would have qualified under had they been American.

== Round summaries ==
=== First round ===
Thursday, April 10, 1980

Place	Player	Score	To par
T1	(Spain) Seve Ballesteros	66	−6
T1	(Australia) David Graham	66	−6
T1	(United States) Jeff Mitchell	66	−6
T4	(United States) Hubert Green	68	−4
T4	(Australia) Jack Newton	68	−4
T6	(United States) Tom Kite	69	−3
T6	(United States) Larry Nelson	69	−3
T8	(United States) Gibby Gilbert	70	−2
T8	(United States) Artie McNickle	70	−2
T8	(United States) Andy North	70	−2
T8	(United States) Jim Simons	70	−2
T8	(United States) Ed Sneed	70	−2

=== Second round ===
Friday, April 11, 1980

Place	Player	Score	To par
1	(Spain) Seve Ballesteros	66-69=135	−9
T2	(United States) Rex Caldwell	73-66=139	−5
T2	(Australia) David Graham	66-73=139	−5
T4	(United States) Tom Kite	69-71=140	−4
T4	(United States) Jerry Pate	72-68=140	−4
T4	(United States) Jim Simons	70-70=140	−4
T4	(United States) Ed Sneed	70-70=140	−4
T4	(United States) Doug Tewell	71-69=140	−4
T9	(United States) Ed Fiori	71-70=141	−3
T9	(United States) Jeff Mitchell	66-75=141	−3
T9	(United States) Larry Nelson	69-72=141	−3

=== Third round ===
Saturday, April 12, 1980

Place	Player	Score	To par
1	(Spain) Seve Ballesteros	66-69-68=203	−13
2	(United States) Ed Fiori	71-70-69=210	−6
T3	(Australia) David Graham	66-73-72=211	−5
T3	(Australia) Jack Newton	68-74-69=211	−5
T3	(United States) Andy North	70-72-69=211	−5
T3	(United States) J. C. Snead	73-69-69=211	−5
T7	(United States) Rex Caldwell	73-66-73=212	−4
T7	(United States) Jim Colbert	72-70-70=212	−4
T7	(United States) Gibby Gilbert	70-74-68=212	−4
T7	(United States) Jim Simons	70-70-72=212	−4
T7	(United States) Fuzzy Zoeller	72-70-70=212	−4

=== Final round ===
Sunday, April 13, 1980

==== Final leaderboard ====
Champion
Silver Cup winner (low amateur)
(a) = amateur
(c) = past champion

Top 10
Place	Player	Score	To par	Money (US$)
1	(Spain) Seve Ballesteros	66-69-68-72=275	−13	55,000
T2	(United States) Gibby Gilbert	70-74-68-67=279	−9	30,500
T2	(Australia) Jack Newton	68-74-69-68=279	−9	30,500
4	(United States) Hubert Green	68-74-71-67=280	−8	15,750
5	(Australia) David Graham	66-73-72-70=281	−7	13,200
T6	(United States) Ben Crenshaw	76-70-68-69=283	−5	9,958
T6	(United States) Ed Fiori	71-70-69-73=283	−5	9,958
T6	(United States) Tom Kite	69-71-74-69=283	−5	9,958
T6	(United States) Larry Nelson	69-72-73-69=283	−5	9,958
T6	(United States) Jerry Pate	72-68-76-67=283	−5	9,958
T6	(South Africa) Gary Player (c)	71-71-71-70=283	−5	9,958

Leaderboard below the top 10
Place	Player	Score	To par	Money ($)
T12	(United States) Andy Bean	74-72-68-70=284	−4	7,250
T12	(United States) Tom Watson (c)	73-69-71-71=284	−4	7,250
T14	(United States) Jim Colbert	72-70-70-73=285	−3	5,917
T14	(United States) Jack Renner	72-70-72-71=285	−3	5,917
T14	(United States) J. C. Snead	73-69-69-74=285	−3	5,917
T17	(United States) Raymond Floyd (c)	75-70-74-67=286	−2	5,075
T17	(United States) Jay Haas	72-74-70-70=286	−2	5,075
T19	(United States) Billy Kratzert	73-69-72-73=287	−1	3,990
T19	(United States) Gil Morgan	74-71-75-67=287	−1	3,990
T19	(United States) Calvin Peete	73-71-76-67=287	−1	3,990
T19	(United States) Jim Simons	70-70-72-75=287	−1	3,990
T19	(United States) Fuzzy Zoeller (c)	72-70-70-75=287	−1	3,990
T24	(United States) Andy North	70-72-69-77=288	E	3,025
T24	(United States) Arnold Palmer (c)	73-73-73-69=288	E	3,025
T26	(United States) Keith Fergus	72-71-72-74=289	+1	2,430
T26	(United States) Lou Graham	71-74-71-73=289	+1	2,430
T26	(United States) Jay Sigel (a)	71-71-73-74=289	+1	0
T26	(United States) Craig Stadler	74-70-72-73=289	+1	2,430
T26	(United States) Dave Stockton	74-70-76-69=289	+1	2,430
T26	(United States) Lee Trevino	74-71-70-74=289	+1	2,430
32	(United States) Tom Purtzer	72-71-74-73=290	+2	2,150
T33	(United States) John Fought	74-72-74-71=291	+3	1,860
T33	(United States) Joe Inman	74-70-75-72=291	+3	1,860
T33	(Australia) Graham Marsh	71-72-72-76=291	+3	1,860
T33	(United States) Jack Nicklaus (c)	74-71-73-73=291	+3	1,860
T33	(United States) Bill Rogers	73-71-76-71=291	+3	1,860
T38	(United States) Rex Caldwell	73-66-73-80=292	+4	1,525
T38	(United States) Charles Coody (c)	72-73-71-76=292	+4	1,525
T38	(United States) Johnny Miller	74-72-71-75=292	+4	1,525
T38	(United States) Jeff Mitchell	66-75-75-76=292	+4	1,525
T38	(United States) Doug Tewell	71-69-79-73=292	+4	1,525
T38	(United States) Howard Twitty	72-72-77-71=292	+4	1,525
T44	(United States) Jim Holtgrieve (a)	74-72-77-70=293	+5	0
T44	(United States) John Mahaffey	75-70-73-75=293	+5	1,500
T44	(United States) Chi-Chi Rodríguez	74-72-71-76=293	+5	1,500
T44	(United States) Ed Sneed	70-70-79-74=293	+5	1,500
48	(Scotland) Sandy Lyle	76-70-70-78=294	+6	1,500
49	(United States) Gene Littler	72-72-77-75=296	+8	1,500
50	(United States) Bobby Clampett (a)	72-71-79-75=297	+9	0
51	(United States) Art Wall Jr. (c)	73-73-77-77=300	+12	1,500
52	(United States) Hal Sutton (a)	73-73-82-73=301	+13	0
CUT	(United States) George Archer (c)	77-70=147	+3	
CUT	(United States) George Burns	77-70=147	+3	
CUT	(United States) Dave Eichelberger	75-72=147	+3	
CUT	(United States) Bob Gilder	76-71=147	+3	
CUT	(United States) Hale Irwin	74-73=147	+3	
CUT	(United States) Don January	75-72=147	+3	
CUT	(United States) Wayne Levi	76-71=147	+3	
CUT	(United States) Joey Rassett (a)	73-74=147	+3	
CUT	(United States) Curtis Strange	77-70=147	+3	
CUT	(United States) Miller Barber	76-72=148	+4	
CUT	(England) Mark James	74-74=148	+4	
CUT	(United States) Ron Streck	75-73=148	+4	
CUT	(United States) Leonard Thompson	75-73=148	+4	
CUT	(United States) Cecil Ingram III (a)	74-75=149	+5	
CUT	(United States) Artie McNickle	70-79=149	+5	
CUT	(United States) Tommy Aaron (c)	76-74=150	+6	
CUT	(United States) Mark Hayes	74-76=150	+6	
CUT	(United States) Bruce Lietzke	81-69=150	+6	
CUT	(United States) Lanny Wadkins	76-75=151	+7	
CUT	(United States) D. A. Weibring	77-74=151	+7	
CUT	(United States) Doug Ford (c)	77-75=152	+8	
CUT	(United States) Al Geiberger	77-75=152	+8	
CUT	(United States) Mike Gove (a)	78-74=152	+8	
CUT	(United States) Jerry McGee	82-70=152	+8	
CUT	(Japan) Tōru Nakamura	81-71=152	+8	
CUT	(United States) Gay Brewer (c)	82-71=153	+9	
CUT	(United States) Lee Elder	76-77=153	+9	
CUT	(United States) Bob Goalby (c)	75-78=153	+9	
CUT	(Japan) Isao Aoki	77-77=154	+10	
CUT	(United States) Billy Casper (c)	77-77=154	+10	
CUT	(United States) Sam Snead (c)	77-77=154	+10	
CUT	(United States) Doug Fischesser (a)	78-77=155	+11	
CUT	(England) Peter McEvoy (a)	79-76=155	+11	
CUT	(United States) Griff Moody (a)	79-76=155	+11	
CUT	(United States) Marty West (a)	82-78=160	+16	
CUT	(United States) Mark O'Meara (a)	80-81=161	+17	
CUT	(United States) Tom Weiskopf	85-79=164	+20	
CUT	(United States) Doug Clarke (a)	89-85=174	+30	
WD	(United States) Lon Hinkle	78	+6	

==== Scorecard ====
Final round

Hole	1	2	3	4	5	6	7	8	9	10	11	12	13	14	15	16	17	18
Par	4	5	4	3	4	3	4	5	4	4	4	3	5	4	5	3	4	4
(Spain) Ballesteros	−14	−14	−15	−15	−16	−16	−16	−16	−16	−15	−15	−13	−12	−12	−13	−13	−13	−13
(United States) Gilbert	−4	−4	−4	−5	−5	−6	−6	−6	−6	−6	−6	−6	−7	−8	−9	−10	−10	−9
(Australia) Newton	−5	−6	−6	−6	−6	−7	−6	−7	−6	−6	−7	−8	−9	−9	−9	−9	−9	−9
(United States) Green	−3	−4	−5	−5	−5	−5	−5	−6	−6	−5	−5	−4	−5	−5	−7	−7	−8	−8
(Australia) Graham	−5	−5	−5	−5	−5	−5	−5	−5	−4	−4	−4	−5	−6	−6	−7	−7	−7	−7
(United States) Fiori	−6	−6	−6	−6	−6	−5	−5	−5	−5	−5	−6	−5	−5	−5	−5	−5	−5	−5
(United States) Snead	−5	−6	−5	−5	−4	−4	−4	−4	−4	−4	−4	−4	−4	−4	−4	−3	−3	−3
(United States) North	−4	−1	−1	−1	−1	−1	−1	−1	+1	+1	+1	+1	+1	E	−1	−1	−1	E

Cumulative tournament scores, relative to par

Eagle	Birdie	Bogey	Double bogey	Triple bogey +
