= 1981 U.S. Open (golf) =

Coordinates: 40.001°N 75.312°W

Tournament information
- Dates: June 18–21, 1981
- Location: Ardmore, Pennsylvania
- Course(s): Merion Golf Club; East Course
- Organized by: USGA
- Tour: PGA Tour

Statistics
- Par: 70
- Length: 6,544 yards (5,984 m)
- Field: 156 players, 70 after cut
- Cut: 147 (+7)
- Prize fund: $361,730
- Winner's share: $55,000

Champion
- (Australia) David Graham
- 273 (−7)

Location in the United States

The 1981 U.S. Open was the 81st U.S. Open, held June 18–21 at the East Course of Merion Golf Club in Ardmore, Pennsylvania, a suburb northwest of Philadelphia. David Graham won his second major title and became the first Australian to win the U.S. Open, three strokes ahead of runners-up George Burns and Bill Rogers.

After a first round 66, Jim Thorpe made history as the first African-American since 1896 to lead the U.S. Open. Burns took a one-stroke lead over Graham with a 66 in the second round, then increased his lead to three strokes after 54 holes.

In the final round on Sunday, Graham shot one of the most precise rounds in U.S. Open history. He hit nearly every green in regulation, missed just one fairway, and recorded four birdies, missing several other opportunities from within 10 feet (3 m). The only bogey was a three-putt at the fifth, after his approach shot stopped above the hole. After a string of eight pars, Graham finally passed Burns with birdies at the 14th and 15th holes. Graham carded a 67 to Burns' 73 to win by three strokes. Rogers shot 69 to tie Burns for 2nd and won the British Open four weeks later.

This was the fourth U.S. Open played at Merion, all at its East Course. Previous editions were hosted in 1934, 1950, and 1971. At 6,544 yards (5,984 m), the same length as 1971, it was the shortest U.S. Open course since 1947. With heavy rains softening the course before the tournament, 93 rounds of par 70 or better were recorded. Fifteen players were under par after 36 holes, but only five finished under par for the four rounds. Five more were at even par 280, including defending champion Jack Nicklaus, a four-time winner.

After 1981, the U.S. Open was not played at Merion until 2013.

== Course layout ==
East Course

Hole	1	2	3	4	5	6	7	8	9	Out	10	11	12	13	14	15	16	17	18	In	Total
Yards	355	535	183	600	426	420	350	360	195	3,424	312	370	405	129	414	378	430	224	458	3,120	6,544
Par	4	5	3	5	4	4	4	4	3	36	4	4	4	3	4	4	4	3	4	34	70

Lengths of the course for previous U.S. Opens:

- 1971: 6,544 yards (5,984 m), par 70
- 1950: 6,694 yards (6,121 m), par 70
- 1934: 6,694 yards (6,121 m), par 70

== Round summaries ==
=== First round ===
Thursday, June 18, 1981

Place	Player	Score	To par
1	(United States) Jim Thorpe	66	−4
2	(United States) J. C. Snead	67	−3
T3	(United States) Bob Ackerman	68	−2
T3	(United States) John Cook	68	−2
T3	(Australia) David Graham	68	−2
T3	(United States) Jack Renner	68	−2
T3	(United States) Chi-Chi Rodríguez	68	−2
T8	(United States) George Burns	69	−1
T8	(United States) Rex Caldwell	69	−1
T8	(United States) Hubert Green	69	−1
T8	(United States) Lon Hinkle	69	−1
T8	(United States) Billy Kratzert	69	−1
T8	(United States) Johnny Miller	69	−1
T8	(United States) Jack Nicklaus	69	−1
T8	(United States) Tommy Valentine	69	−1

=== Second round ===
Friday, June 19, 1981

Place	Player	Score	To par
1	(United States) George Burns	69-66=135	−5
2	(Australia) David Graham	68-68=136	−4
T3	(United States) Jack Nicklaus	69-68=137	−3
T3	(United States) Tommy Valentine	69-68=137	−3
T5	(United States) John Cook	68-70=138	−2
T5	(United States) Billy Kratzert	69-69=138	−2
T5	(Australia) Greg Norman	71-67=138	−2
T5	(United States) Bill Rogers	70-68=138	−2
T9	(United States) Jerry Pate	70-69=139	−1
T9	(United States) Jack Renner	68-71=139	−1
T9	(United States) John Schroeder	71-68=139	−1
T9	(United States) Scott Simpson	72-67=139	−1
T9	(United States) Jim Thorpe	66-73=139	−1
T9	(United States) Lanny Wadkins	71-68=139	−1
T9	(United States) Tom Watson	70-69=139	−1

Amateurs: Rassett (E), Cooksey (+6), Norton (+8), Pavin (+9), DeFrancesco (+10), White (+10), Sindelar (+11), Faxon (+12), Lawrence (+14), Sanchez (+14), Moore (+15), Mudd (+15), Yokoi (+15), Biancalana (+16), Jones (+16), Ludwig (+16), Magee (+17), Hurter (+21), Brodie (+22).

=== Third round ===
Saturday, June 20, 1981

Place	Player	Score	To par
1	(United States) George Burns	69-66-68=203	−7
2	(Australia) David Graham	68-68-70=206	−4
3	(United States) Bill Rogers	70-68-69=207	−3
T4	(United States) Jack Nicklaus	69-68-71=208	−2
T4	(United States) Chi-Chi Rodríguez	68-73-67=208	−2
T4	(United States) John Schroeder	71-68-69=208	−2
T7	(United States) John Cook	68-70-71=209	−1
T7	(United States) Ben Crenshaw	70-75-64=209	−1
T7	(United States) Jim Thorpe	66-73-70=209	−1
T7	(United States) Tommy Valentine	69-68-72=209	−1

=== Final round ===
Sunday, June 21, 1981

Place	Player	Score	To par	Money ($)
1	(Australia) David Graham	68-68-70-67=273	−7	55,000
T2	(United States) George Burns	69-66-68-73=276	−4	24,650
T2	(United States) Bill Rogers	70-68-69-69=276	−4	24,650
T4	(United States) John Cook	68-70-71-70=279	−1	16,200
T4	(United States) John Schroeder	71-68-69-71=279	−1	16,200
T6	(United States) Frank Conner	71-72-69-68=280	E	9,920
T6	(United States) Lon Hinkle	69-71-70-70=280	E	9,920
T6	(United States) Jack Nicklaus	69-68-71-72=280	E	9,920
T6	(United States) Sammy Rachels	70-71-69-70=280	E	9,920
T6	(United States) Chi-Chi Rodríguez	68-73-67-72=280	E	9,920

Amateur: Rassett (+14).

==== Scorecard ====
Final round

Hole	1	2	3	4	5	6	7	8	9	10	11	12	13	14	15	16	17	18
Par	4	5	3	5	4	4	4	4	3	4	4	4	3	4	4	4	3	4
(Australia) Graham	−5	−6	−6	−6	−5	−5	−5	−5	−5	−5	−5	−5	−5	−6	−7	−7	−7	−7
(United States) Burns	−7	−7	−7	−6	−6	−6	−6	−6	−6	−5	−5	−5	−5	−5	−5	−4	−5	−4
(United States) Rogers	−3	−3	−3	−3	−3	−2	−2	−3	−4	−3	−3	−4	−4	−4	−4	−3	−3	−4

Cumulative playoff scores, relative to par

Birdie	Bogey
