= Ben Crenshaw =

American professional golfer (born 1952)

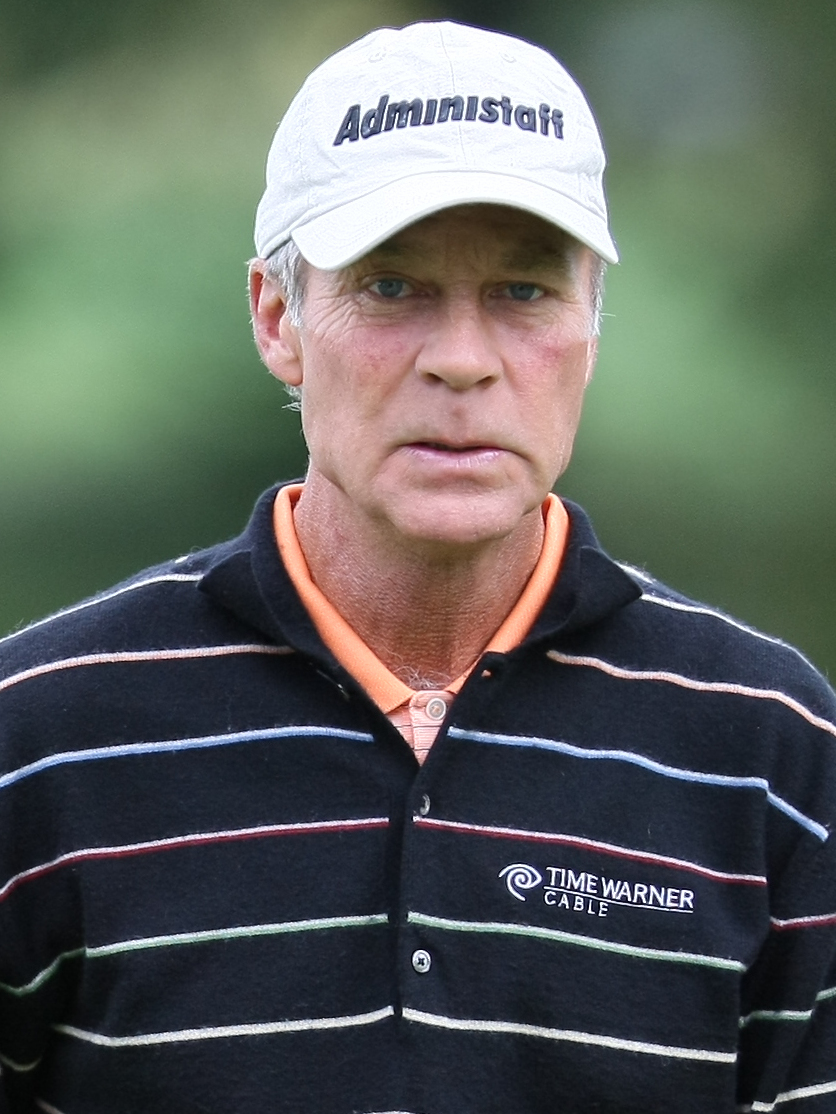
- Crenshaw in 2009

Personal information
- Full name: Ben Daniel Crenshaw
- Nickname: Gentle Ben
- Nationality: United States
- Born: January 11, 1952 (age 74) Austin, Texas, U.S.
- Height: 5 ft 9 in (1.75 m)
- Weight: 157 lb (71 kg; 11.2 st)
- Spouses: Julie (m. 1985−present); Polly (m. 1976−1985)
- Children: Claire Susan, Anna Riley, Katherine Vail

Career
- Sport: Golf
- College: University of Texas
- Turned professional: 1973
- Current tour: Champions Tour
- Former tour: PGA Tour
- Professional wins: 30
- Highest ranking: 5 (May 22, 1988)

Number of wins by tour
- PGA Tour: 19
- European Tour: 3
- Other: 9 (regular); 1 (senior)

Best results in major championships (wins: 2)
- Masters Tournament: Won: 1984, 1995
- PGA Championship: 2nd: 1979
- U.S. Open: T3: 1975
- The Open Championship: T2: 1978, 1979

Achievements and awards
- World Golf Hall of Fame: 2002 (member page)
- Haskins Award: 1971, 1972, 1973
- Bob Jones Award: 1991
- Old Tom Morris Award: 1997
- Payne Stewart Award: 2001

Ben Daniel Crenshaw (born January 11, 1952) is an American retired professional golfer who has won 19 events on the PGA Tour, including two major championships: the Masters Tournament in 1984 and 1995. Nicknamed Gentle Ben, Crenshaw is widely regarded as one of the best putters in golf history.

== Early life and amateur career ==
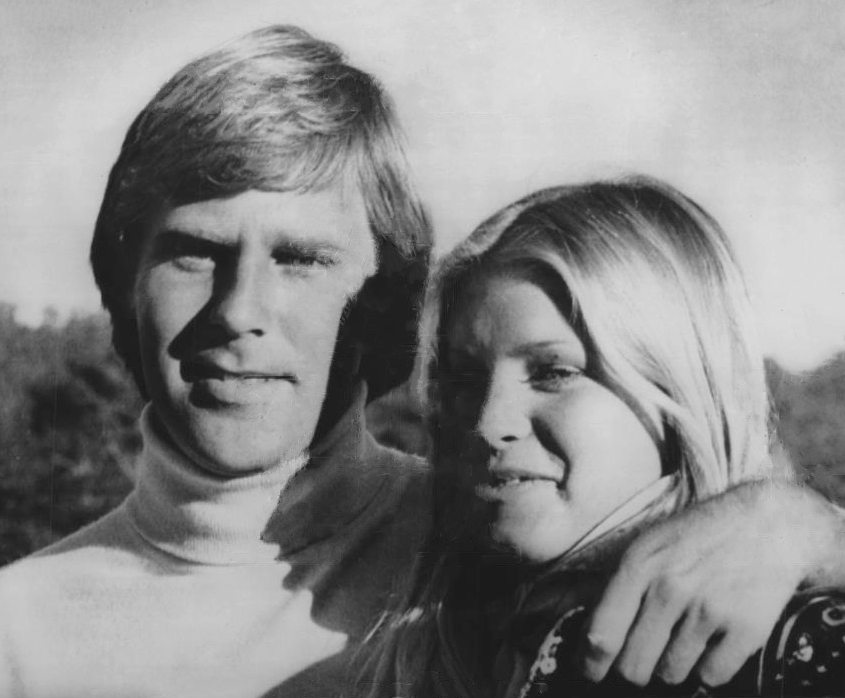
Crenshaw, 24, with wife Polly after winning the Bing Crosby National Pro-Am in January 1976

Born and raised in Austin, Texas, Crenshaw played golf at Austin High School and the University of Texas, where he won three NCAA Championships from 1971 to 1973. Crenshaw was also a member of the Kappa Alpha Order fraternity.

== Professional career ==
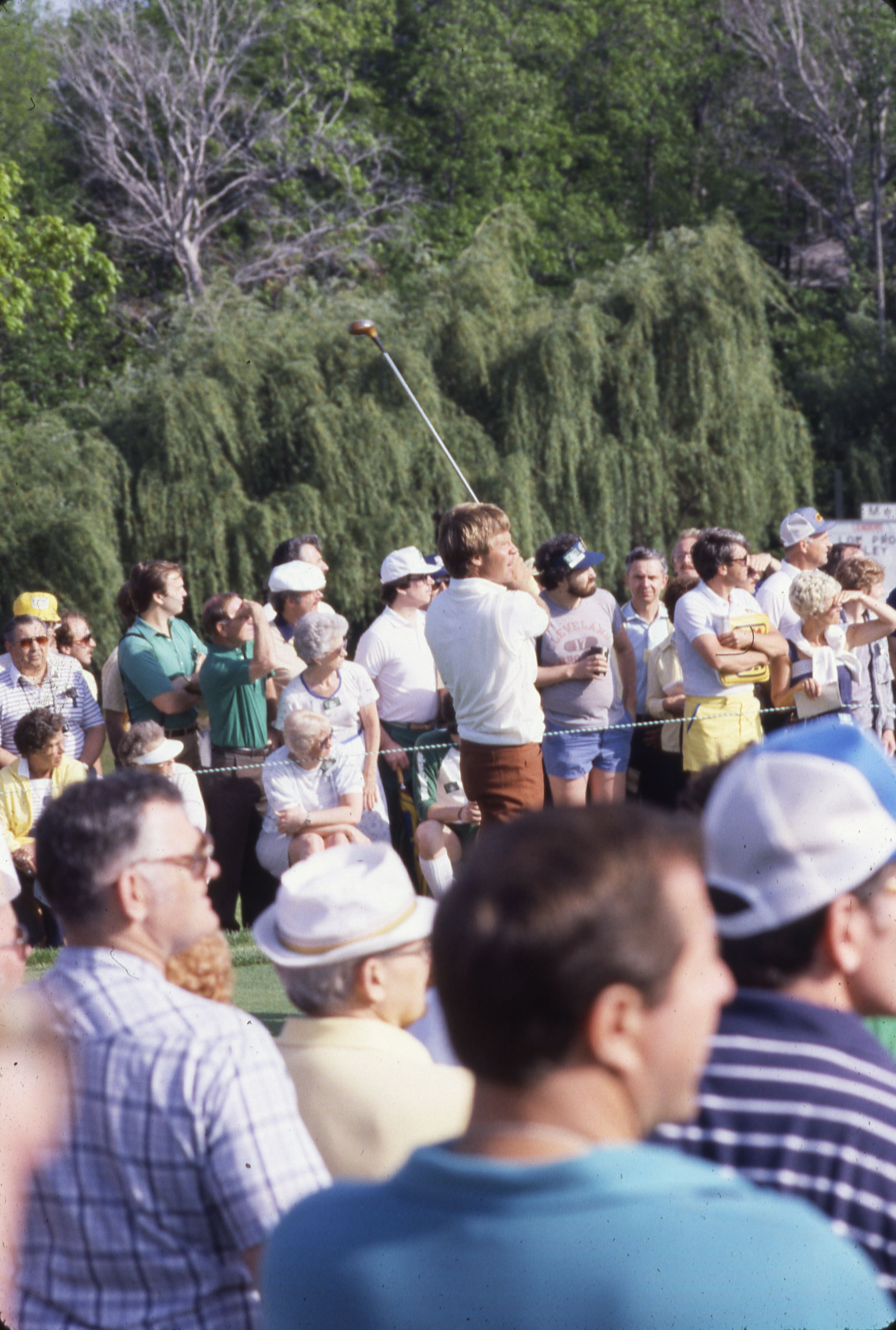
Crenshaw after hitting a drive with at the 1984 Memorial Tournament pro-am at the Muirfield Village Golf Club.

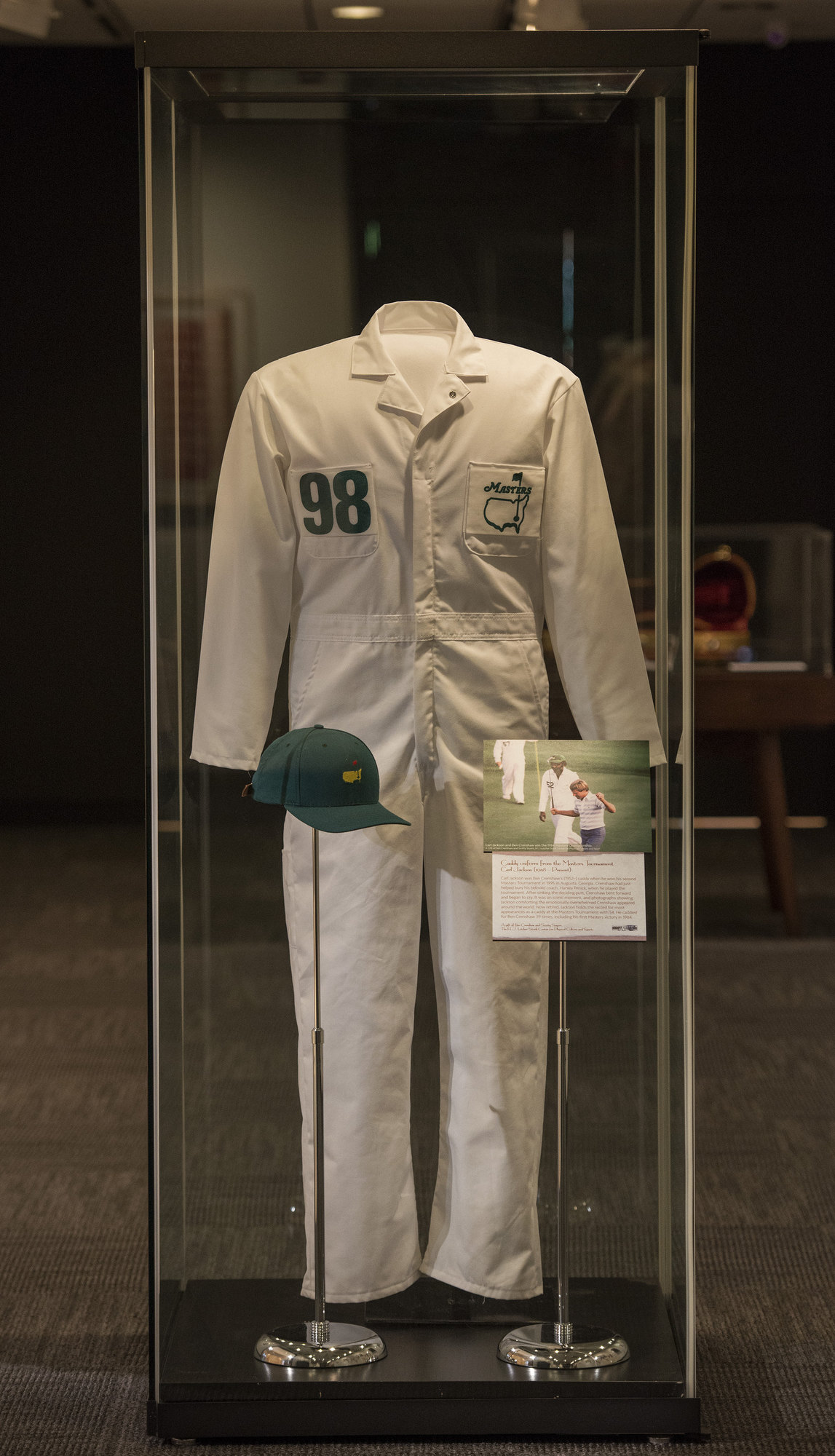
The caddy uniform worn by Carl Jackson (caddie) when he caddied for Crenshaw in the Masters Tournament.

In 1973, Crenshaw turned professional at the age of 21. He played his first PGA Tour event as a pro in mid-August at the USI Classic in Sutton, Massachusetts. Crenshaw finished ten strokes back in a tie for 35th place ($903).

Less than three months later in early November, Crenshaw became the second player to win the first event after earning his tour card, achieved earlier by Marty Fleckman (1967). Crenshaw remains one of a handful of golfers who has completed this feat. Together with his teammate George Burns, he won the Walt Disney World National Team Championship in Orlando in October 1979.

Following five runner-up finishes in major championships without a victory, including a sudden-death playoff at the 1979 PGA Championship, Crenshaw won the Masters Tournament in 1984. In the mid-1980s, he suffered from Graves' disease, a condition of the thyroid, but continued to accumulate victories; he finished with nineteen PGA Tour wins, including an emotional second Masters victory in 1995, which came a week after the death of his mentor Harvey Penick. In 1999, Crenshaw was the captain of the United States Ryder Cup team for the matches at The Country Club in Brookline, Massachusetts, a Boston suburb. He was criticized from some quarters for his captaincy over the first two days as his team slipped to a 10–6 deficit; however, he was ultimately credited for providing the inspiration behind his side's remarkable turnaround in the Sunday singles, as the U.S. won 8 1/2 of the final day's twelve points to regain the Cup.

Crenshaw won several professional events outside the PGA Tour, including individual and team titles in the World Cup of Golf in 1988. He was among the top ten on McCormack's World Golf Rankings from 1976 to 1981 inclusive, and returned to spend 80 weeks in the top-10 of the Official World Golf Ranking from 1987 to 1989. In 1987, he became one of the few players in history to finish in the top ten of all four major championships in the same season without winning any of them.

Despite playing mainly in the United States, Crenshaw had a number of top performances in international events in his career. He won the 1976 Irish Open and then finished runner-up to compatriot Hubert Green the next year. He also finished runner-up at two events on the Australasian Tour, at the 1978 Australian Open and the 1982 Australian PGA Championship. And he famously had two runner-ups at The Open Championship, behind Jack Nicklaus in 1978 and Seve Ballesteros the following year.

Crenshaw is widely regarded as one of the best putters in golf history. His instructor growing up, Harvey Penick, taught him a smooth, effortless stroke on the greens, which allowed him to master even the speediest of greens–including those at Augusta National Golf Club. In winning the Masters in 1995, "Gentle Ben" did not record a single three-putt during the tournament. Since 1986, Crenshaw has been a legal partner with Bill Coore in Coore & Crenshaw, a golf course design firm. The Masters in 2015 was the 44th and final for Crenshaw. Crenshaw has the worst playoff record in PGA Tour history at 0–8.

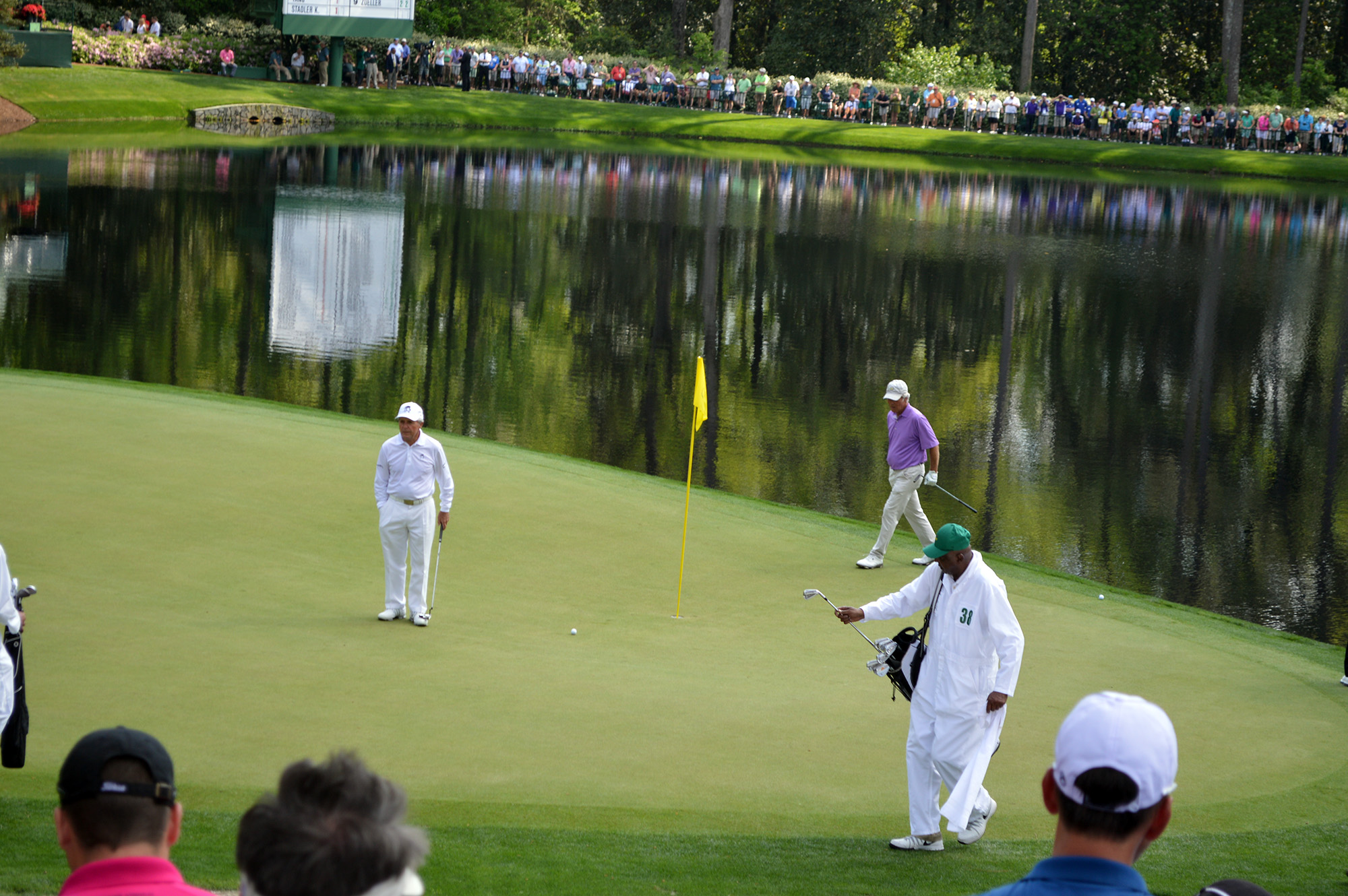
Gary Player and Crenshaw at the 2015 Masters Tournament

== Personal life ==
Crenshaw married his second wife Julie in 1985. All three of his daughters – Claire Susan, Anna Riley, and Katherine Vail – were presented to high society as debutantes at the International Debutante Ball at the Waldorf-Astoria Hotel in New York City. Crenshaw is a Republican and has donated money to multiple Republican candidates.

== Amateur wins ==
- 1968 International Jaycee Junior Golf Tournament
- 1971 NCAA Championship, Eastern Amateur, Southern Amateur
- 1972 NCAA Championship (tie with Tom Kite), Eastern Amateur, Porter Cup, Trans-Mississippi Amateur
- 1973 NCAA Championship, Western Amateur, Sunnehanna Amateur, Southern Amateur, Northeast Amateur

== Professional wins (30) ==
=== PGA Tour wins (19) ===
Legend
Major championships (2)
Other PGA Tour (17)

No.	Date	Tournament	Winning score	Margin of victory	Runner(s)-up
1	Nov 4, 1973	San Antonio Texas Open	−14 (65-72-66-67=270)	2 strokes	(United States) Orville Moody
2	Jan 25, 1976	Bing Crosby National Pro-Am	−7 (75-67-70-69=281)	2 strokes	(United States) Mike Morley
3	Feb 1, 1976	Hawaiian Open	−18 (70-69-65-66=270)	4 strokes	(United States) Hale Irwin, (United States) Larry Nelson
4	Sep 19, 1976	Ohio Kings Island Open	−9 (69-69-67-66=271)	1 stroke	(United States) Andy North
5	May 15, 1977	Colonial National Invitation	−8 (65-70-68-69=272)	1 stroke	(United States) John Schroeder
6	Jan 22, 1979	Phoenix Open	−14 (67-61-71=199)*	1 stroke	(United States) Jay Haas
7	Oct 28, 1979	Walt Disney World National Team Championship (with (United States) George Burns)	−33 (62-66-62-65=255)	3 strokes	(United States) Scott Bess and (Canada) Dan Halldorson, (United States) Jeff Hewes and (United States) Sammy Rachels, (United States) Peter Jacobsen and (United States) D. A. Weibring
8	Sep 28, 1980	Anheuser-Busch Golf Classic	−16 (66-67-68-71=272)	4 strokes	(United States) Jack Renner
9	May 1, 1983	Byron Nelson Golf Classic	−7 (71-69-67-66=273)	1 stroke	(United States) Brad Bryant, (United States) Hal Sutton
10	Apr 15, 1984	Masters Tournament	−11 (67-72-70-68=277)	2 strokes	(United States) Tom Watson
11	Jul 27, 1986	Buick Open	−18 (69-67-66-68=270)	1 stroke	(United States) J. C. Snead, (United States) Doug Tewell
12	Oct 26, 1986	Vantage Championship	−14 (65-67-64=196)*	1 stroke	(United States) Payne Stewart
13	Mar 22, 1987	USF&G Classic	−20 (66-68-67-67=268)	3 strokes	(United States) Curtis Strange
14	Mar 6, 1988	Doral-Ryder Open	−14 (70-69-69-66=274)	1 stroke	(United States) Chip Beck, (United States) Mark McCumber
15	May 20, 1990	Southwestern Bell Colonial (2)	−8 (69-65-72-66=272)	3 strokes	(United States) John Mahaffey, (United States) Corey Pavin, (Zimbabwe) Nick Price
16	Jul 5, 1992	Centel Western Open	−12 (70-72-65-69=276)	1 stroke	(Australia) Greg Norman
17	Mar 21, 1993	Nestle Invitational	−8 (71-70-69-70=280)	2 strokes	(United States) Davis Love III, (United States) Rocco Mediate, (Fiji) Vijay Singh
18	Apr 3, 1994	Freeport-McMoRan Classic	−15 (69-68-68-68=273)	3 strokes	(Spain) José María Olazábal
19	Apr 9, 1995	Masters Tournament (2)	−14 (70-67-69-68=274)	1 stroke	(United States) Davis Love III

*Note: Tournament shortened to 54 holes due to rain.

PGA Tour playoff record (0–8)

No.	Year	Tournament	Opponent(s)	Result
1	1978	Bing Crosby National Pro-Am	(United States) Tom Watson	Lost to par on second extra hole
2	1979	Western Open	(United States) Larry Nelson	Lost to birdie on first extra hole
3	1979	PGA Championship	(Australia) David Graham	Lost to birdie on third extra hole
4	1981	Bing Crosby National Pro-Am	(United States) Bobby Clampett, (United States) John Cook, (United States) Hale Irwin, (United States) Barney Thompson	Cook won with par on third extra hole Clampett, Crenshaw and Thompson eliminated by birdie on first hole
5	1981	Texas Open	(United States) Bill Rogers	Lost to birdie on first extra hole
6	1987	Los Angeles Open	(Taiwan) Chen Tze-chung	Lost to par on first extra hole
7	1989	NEC World Series of Golf	(South Africa) David Frost	Lost to par on second extra hole
8	1992	GTE Byron Nelson Classic	(United States) Billy Ray Brown, (United States) Raymond Floyd, (United States) Bruce Lietzke	Brown won with birdie on first extra hole

=== European Tour wins (3) ===
Legend
Major championships (2)
Other European Tour (1)

No.	Date	Tournament	Winning score	Margin of victory	Runner(s)-up
1	Aug 29, 1976	Carroll's Irish Open	−4 (73-69-69-73=284)	2 strokes	(Scotland) Brian Barnes, (United States) Billy Casper, (England) Martin Foster
2	Apr 15, 1984	Masters Tournament	−11 (67-72-70-68=277)	2 strokes	(United States) Tom Watson
3	Apr 9, 1995	Masters Tournament (2)	−14 (70-67-69-68=274)	1 stroke	(United States) Davis Love III

European Tour playoff record (0–1)

No.	Year	Tournament	Opponent	Result
1	1979	PGA Championship	(Australia) David Graham	Lost to birdie on third extra hole

=== Other wins (9) ===
- 1975 Texas State Open
- 1979 Texas State Open
- 1980 Texas State Open
- 1981 Mexican Open
- 1985 Shootout at Jeremy Ranch (with Miller Barber)
- 1988 World Cup (team title with Mark McCumber), World Cup Individual Trophy
- 1991 Fred Meyer Challenge (with Paul Azinger)
- 1995 PGA Grand Slam of Golf

=== Senior wins (1) ===
- 2009 Wendy's Champions Skins Game (with Fuzzy Zoeller)

== Major championships ==
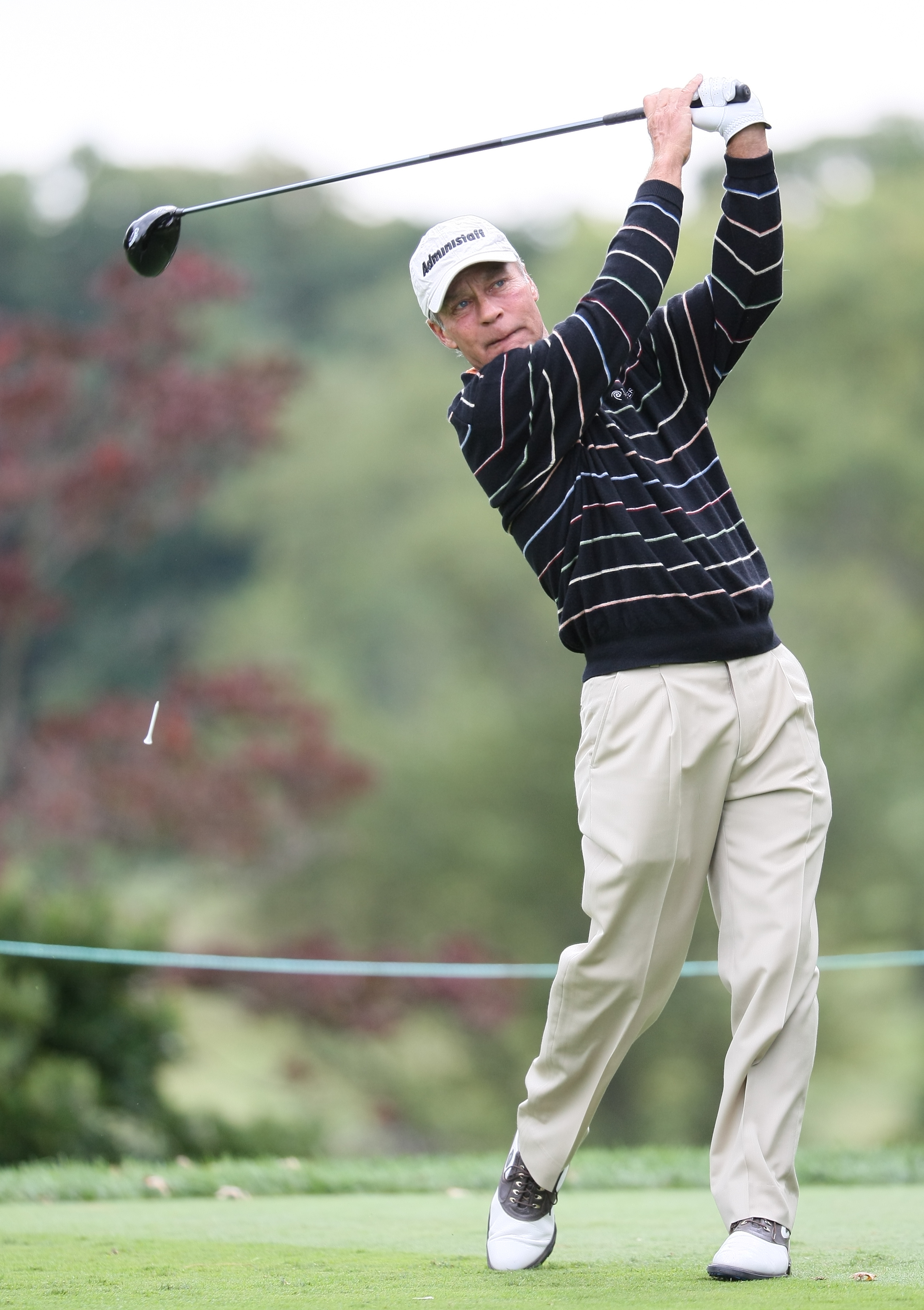
Crenshaw at the 2009 Senior Players Championship

=== Wins (2) ===
Year	Championship	54 holes	Winning score	Margin	Runner-up
1984	Masters Tournament	2 shot deficit	−11 (67-72-70-68=277)	2 strokes	(United States) Tom Watson
1995	Masters Tournament (2)	Tied for lead	−14 (70-67-69-68=274)	1 stroke	(United States) Davis Love III

=== Results timeline ===
Tournament	1970	1971	1972	1973	1974	1975	1976	1977	1978	1979
Masters Tournament			T19 LA	T24 LA	T22	T30	2	T8	T37	CUT
U.S. Open	T36 LA	T27	CUT	CUT		T3	T8	T49	CUT	T11
The Open Championship					T28			T5	T2	T2
PGA Championship					T63	T10	T8		T16	2

Tournament	1980	1981	1982	1983	1984	1985	1986	1987	1988	1989
Masters Tournament	T6	T8	T24	T2	1	T57	T16	T4	4	T3
U.S. Open	T32	T11	T19	CUT	CUT	CUT	T6	T4	T12	CUT
The Open Championship	3	T8	T15	CUT	T22	T35	T21	T4	T16	T52
PGA Championship	T41	CUT	CUT	T9	CUT	T59	T11	T7	T17	T17

Tournament	1990	1991	1992	1993	1994	1995	1996	1997	1998	1999
Masters Tournament	T14	T3	46	CUT	T18	1	CUT	45	CUT	CUT
U.S. Open	CUT				T33	T71	CUT	T65	CUT	CUT
The Open Championship	T31	T80		CUT	T77	T15	T27		CUT	
PGA Championship	T31	WD	T73	T61	T9	T44	T69	CUT	CUT	CUT

Tournament	2000	2001	2002	2003	2004	2005	2006	2007	2008	2009
Masters Tournament	CUT	CUT	CUT	CUT	CUT	CUT	47	T55	CUT	CUT
U.S. Open										
The Open Championship										
PGA Championship	WD									

Tournament	2010	2011	2012	2013	2014	2015
Masters Tournament	CUT	CUT	CUT	CUT	CUT	CUT
U.S. Open						
The Open Championship						
PGA Championship						

Win
Top 10
Did not play

LA = Low amateur
CUT = missed the halfway cut
WD = withdrew
"T" indicates a tie for a place.

=== Summary ===
Tournament	Wins	2nd	3rd	Top-5	Top-10	Top-25	Events	Cuts made
Masters Tournament	2	2	2	8	11	18	44	25
U.S. Open	0	0	1	2	4	8	26	15
The Open Championship	0	2	1	5	6	11	21	18
PGA Championship	0	1	0	1	6	10	26	18
Totals	2	5	4	16	27	47	117	76

- Most consecutive cuts made – 13 (twice)
- Longest streak of top-10s – 6 (1975 U.S. Open – 1977 Masters)

== Results in The Players Championship ==
Tournament	1974	1975	1976	1977	1978	1979
The Players Championship	T39	T55	T70	CUT	T4	CUT

Tournament	1980	1981	1982	1983	1984	1985	1986	1987	1988	1989
The Players Championship	2	T63	CUT	T10	T26	T33	T54	T9	T11	T11

Tournament	1990	1991	1992	1993	1994	1995	1996	1997	1998	1999
The Players Championship	CUT	CUT	T29	CUT	T19	CUT	T73	CUT	CUT	CUT

Tournament	2000	2001
The Players Championship	CUT	CUT

Top 10

CUT = missed the halfway cut
"T" indicates a tie for a place

== Notable ==
- He played on four Ryder Cup teams (1981, 1983, 1987, 1995) and captained the 1999 team.
- In 1987, he became one of the few players in history to record top-10 finishes in all four major championships in the same season. Ed Dudley, Arnold Palmer, Gary Player, Doug Sanders, Miller Barber, Jack Nicklaus, Hale Irwin, Tom Watson, Tiger Woods, Sergio García, Ernie Els, Phil Mickelson, Vijay Singh, Rickie Fowler, Jordan Spieth, Brooks Koepka, Jon Rahm, and Rory McIlroy have also achieved the feat.
- In 1991, Crenshaw was given the Bob Jones Award, the highest honor bestowed by the United States Golf Association in recognition of distinguished sportsmanship in golf.
- His stepmother, Roberta Crenshaw, was an Austin-area philanthropist.
- He is now a noted golf course designer, working in partnership with Bill Coore.
- He was inducted into the World Golf Hall of Fame in 2002.
- He is the 2006 Kappa Alpha Order Sportsman of the Year.
- "If we are to preserve the integrity of golf as left to us by our forefathers, it is up to all of us to carry on the true spirit of the game."

== U.S. national team appearances ==
Amateur

- Eisenhower Trophy: 1972 (winners)

Professional

- Ryder Cup: 1981 (winners), 1983 (winners), 1987, 1995, 1999 (winners, non-playing captain)
- World Cup: 1987, 1988 (winners, individual winner)
- Kirin Cup: 1988 (winners)
- Dunhill Cup: 1995
- Wendy's 3-Tour Challenge (representing Senior PGA Tour): 2002

== See also ==
- 1973 PGA Tour Qualifying School graduates
- List of golfers with most PGA Tour wins
- List of golf courses designed by Coore & Crenshaw
