= David Graham (golfer) =

Australian professional golfer (born 1946)

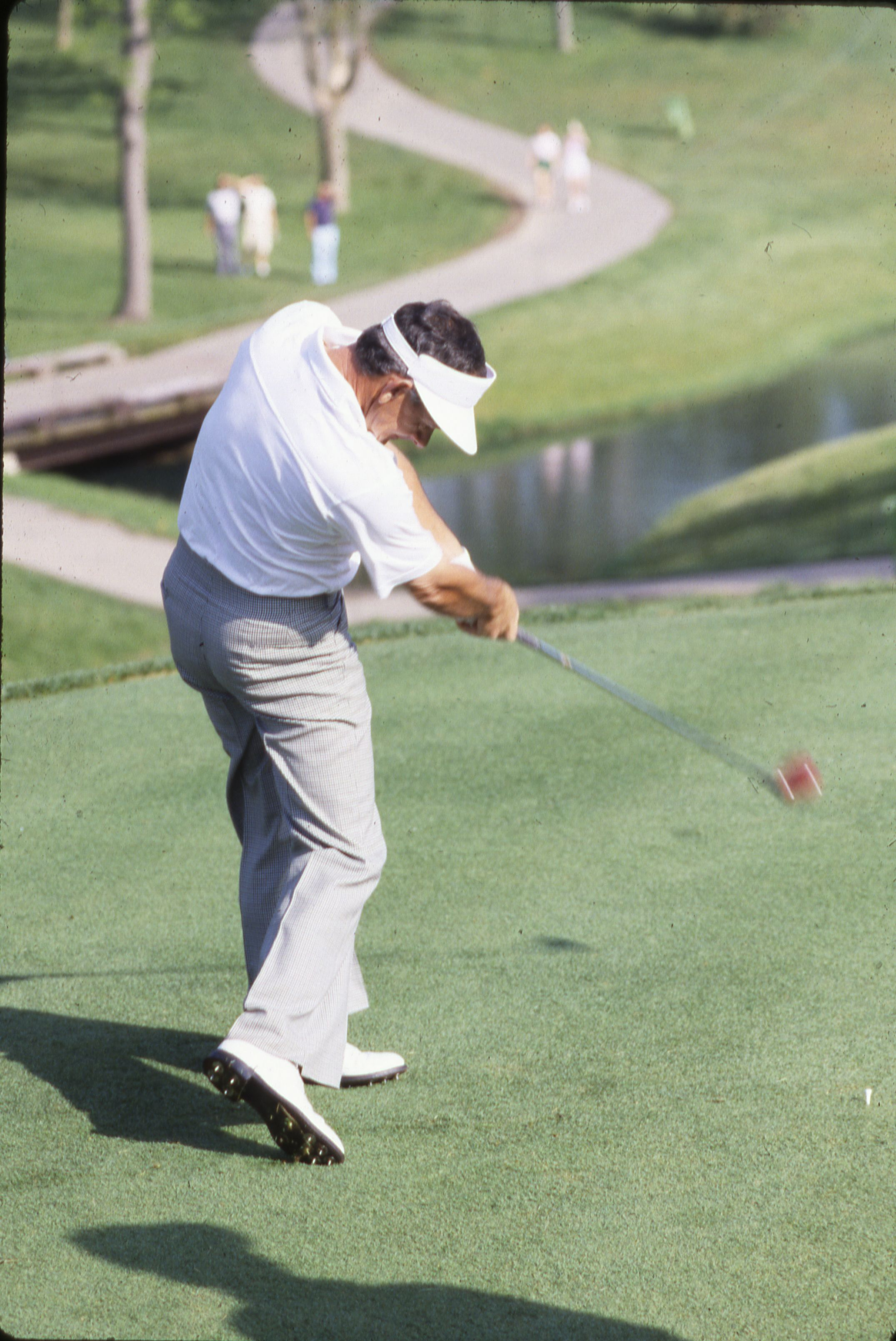
- Graham in 1984

Personal information
- Full name: Anthony David Graham
- Nationality: Australia
- Born: 23 May 1946 (age 80) Melbourne, Australia
- Height: 5 ft 9 in (1.75 m)
- Weight: 152 lb (69 kg; 10.9 st)

Career
- Sport: Golf
- Turned professional: 1962
- Former tours: PGA Tour; PGA Tour of Australia; Champions Tour
- Professional wins: 38

Number of wins by tour
- PGA Tour: 8
- European Tour: 3
- Japan Golf Tour: 1
- PGA Tour of Australasia: 5
- PGA Tour Champions: 5
- Other: 18

Best results in major championships (wins: 2)
- Masters Tournament: 5th: 1980
- PGA Championship: Won: 1979
- U.S. Open: Won: 1981
- The Open Championship: T3: 1985

Achievements and awards
- World Golf Hall of Fame: 2015 (member page)

Anthony David Graham, AM (born 23 May 1946) is an Australian golfer. Graham turned pro as a teenager and had much success on the Australasian circuits in his youth, winning several tournaments. In 1972, he joined the PGA Tour where he continued with good play, winning several tournaments. This culminated with major tournament wins at the 1979 PGA Championship and 1981 U.S. Open. As a senior, Graham won five times on the Senior PGA Tour.

== Early life ==
Graham was born and grew up in Melbourne, Australia. At young age he used to pass the Wattle Park nine-hole golf course when cycling to school and one day the local professional John Green offered him a job in the shop during week-ends. Graham started to learn to play and he did it as a left-hander. At age 13, against the strong will of his father, Graham quit school to work in the golf shop and Graham and his father never spoke to each other after that. At the age of 14, Graham was offered the second-assistant job at Riversdale Golf Club by head professional George Naismith, who convinced Graham to play right-handed.

Shortly thereafter, in late 1962, Naismith retired and Graham instead worked for a short time under Naismith's brother at Waverley Golf Club, south east of Melbourne. Graham then moved to the north-western part of Tasmania to work as an instructor at Seabrook Golf Club.

In 1967, after playing golf with Eric Cremin, who came to Seabrook for an exhibition to promote Precision Golf Forging golf clubs, Graham got the opportunity to start working at a sporting goods store in Sydney. During this time he honed his golf skills at Royal Sydney Golf Club under the tutelage of Alec Mercer, the club professional.

== Professional career ==
In early 1968, Graham started working full-time as a touring professional.

=== Australian and Asian circuits 1968–1970 ===
Among the first tournaments Graham received media attention for was the 1968 Brisbane Water Tournament. In difficult conditions in the second round he moved into a tie for third. The third round was cancelled and in the final round Graham shot a 72 to finish solo fourth, four behind champion Bob Shaw.

In February 1969, Graham finished in a tie for third at the two-round $3,500 Amoco Open at Forbes, New South Wales, four back of champion Tony Mangan.

Shortly thereafter, he moved onto the Asia Golf Circuit. In mid-March he finished joint second at the 1969 Malaysian Open, one behind champion Takaaki Kono. At this point he was in third place on the Asia Golf Circuit's Order of Merit. The following week at the Singapore Open he was one back of leaders Tomio Kamata of Japan and Guy Wolstenholme of England after three rounds. Graham made up one stroke on the leaders during the back nine to enter a playoff with them, but lost to Kamata on the third extra hole.

After these two runner-ups finishes, Graham entered the next tournament, the Hong Kong Open, and shot two rounds of 69 to put him near the lead, but finished in a tie for 14th place. Graham cited his poor putting for his weak play. At that point Graham said his goal was to qualify for the Alcan Open, a limited-field tournament on the PGA Tour to be held in September in the United States. The 1969 Asia Golf Circuit finished in April with Graham tied forth on the Order of Merit.

In June 1969 he played a two-round tournament for a $1,650 purse in Goolwa, South Australia at South Lakes Golf Course. He shot a final round 70 to defeat John Lister by one stroke.

As of August 1969, Graham had qualified for the Alcan Open in Portland, Oregon. He finished 22nd among the 24 players in the field, 23 shots behind champion Billy Casper.

Shortly thereafter, he returned to Australia. In October he played the City of Sydney Open and finished fourth. Later in the month he played the Australian Open. He shot a second round 69 to move into a tie for fifth, behind Guy Wolstenholme, Bruce Devlin, Peter Thomson, and Gary Player. However, he was not near the lead as the tournament concluded. In November he played the North Coast Open in Coffs Harbour, New South Wales. He finished in solo second place, three back of champion Tony Mangan. In December he played the Caltex Tournament at Paraparaumu Links Golf Course in Wellington, New Zealand, and finished in a tie for fourteenth.

Early in 1970, Graham won two events in Australia. In February, he played the Tasmanian Open at Kingston Beach Golf Club. With a final round 72, Graham defeated Terry Kendall by one. Right before the tournament began he played the one-round $750 Golden Crumpet Purse, also at Kingston Beach. He shot a 68 (−5) to tie Terry Kendall for second place, two behind champion Tony Mangan.

The next week he won the Victorian Open. Graham defeated Kevin Hartley, Kel Nagle, and Guy Wolstenholme by four shots. His 273 (−19) total broke Yarra Yarra Golf Club's course record, set by Gary Player in 1959, by two shots.

The following week Graham played the New South Wales Open at Pymble Golf Course in Sydney. After three rounds Graham was five behind leader Kel Nagle. In the final round Graham made four birdies on holes 13–17. At the 477-yard par-5 18th hole Graham hit his second shot into a bunker. He hit his sand shot to 18 feet. His "chances of birdie looked remote" but he holed the putt creating a "tremendous roar" from the gallery. He entered an 18-hole playoff with Frank Phillips the following day. Graham was behind for most of the playoff but got tied by the 15th hole. However, Phillips birdied the final two holes to defeat Graham by two strokes.

Back onto the Asia Golf Circuit he played the Thailand Open in March 1970. He came from three strokes behind in the final round to win. The following month he played the Yomiuri International in Japan, also on the Asian circuit. Graham birdied the final two holes to win by three over New Zealander Walter Godfrey and four over pre-tournament favorite Tommy Aaron. With the victory, Graham won A$10,500 and a Japanese car.

As of July 1970, he had qualified for The Open at St Andrews, Scotland, where he entered The Open Championship for the first time and went on to finished tied 32nd.

In early November 1970, Graham attempted to qualify for the PGA Tour at PGA Tour Qualifying School in Tucson, Arizona. He failed to qualify by one stroke.

In December 1970, two weeks after his appearance at the 1970 World Cup in Argentina, Graham played the Argentine Masters. After the first two rounds, Graham was tied for second, one behind the leader Roberto De Vicenzo, who went on to win the tournament.

=== Team appearances in the World Cup and the Dunhill Cup ===
Late in November 1970 it was announced that Graham would represent Australia at the 1970 World Cup with Bruce Devlin. The event would be held at the Jockey Club in Buenos Aires, Argentina. Ahead of the World Cup event, the organizing International Golf Association, preferred the more well-known Bruce Crampton to team for Australia with Bruce Devlin. Crampton, as well as Kel Nagle and Peter Thomson, had declined to play and The Australian PGA threatened not to send a team if Graham was not included.

It took a 54-hour plane trip for both Graham and Devin to reach Argentina and both were "tired" once they started playing the first round. However, both played excellently in the opening round. Graham fired a bogey-free 65 (−7) and Devlin a bogey-free 66 (−6). At 131 (−13), they held a three-stroke lead over Argentina's team. In the individual competition, Graham was in solo second, one behind leader, home legend Roberto De Vicenzo, while Devlin was tied for third. After the round Graham stated, "I don't regard it as my best performance ever, but it is pretty close." In the second round Graham shot a 67 (−5) while Devlin shot a 69 (−3). In the third round Graham shot a back nine 30 (−7), including birdies on the final four holes, to record at 65 (−7). Devlin recorded a third round 66 (−6). They held a 19-stroke lead over Argentina, the second place team. After the round, according to The Canberra Times, "Graham said the three rounds here were the so far were the best he's ever played." Among individuals, Graham held a two-stroke lead over Roberto De Vicenzo. At the beginning of the final round both Graham and his partner Devlin played poorly shooting 35 and 36, respectively, over the course of the par-35 front nine. In addition, Graham lost the solo individual lead to de Vicenzo when Graham bogeyed the par-3 8th hole and the Argentine birdied it. According to the Papua New Guinea Post-Courier, however, at the end of the front nine the Australians "were assured of victory over their nearest rivals Argentina." At his point their team still had an 11 stroke lead over Argentina. Among individuals, "The lead see-sawed back and forth until De Vicenzo took the lead for good with a birdie on the par-5 15th." Graham finished second among individuals. The Australian team won by a record ten shots. At 544, they beat the team record set by Arnold Palmer and Jack Nicklaus at the 1966 Canada Cup by four shots.

Devlin and Graham again represented Australia in the 1971 World Cup, but when Devlin was not selected for the event the year after, Graham refused to play and never again participated in any World Cup events.

Another controversy with Graham involved was reported during the inaugural 1985 Dunhill Cup at the Old Course at St Andrews, Scotland. Australia won the team event, with Graham, Greg Norman and Graham Marsh in the team. Prior to the tournament, Marsh had criticized Graham for accepting appearance money for playing in Australian golf tournaments. At the time, Marsh had recently been made an MBE for services to golf and was for six years chairman of the PGA Tour of Australasia. However, Norman took David Graham's side in the debate and Australia went on to win the tournament despite the conflict. In 1986, Australia successfully defended the title with Graham, Norman and Rodger Davis in their team.

=== PGA Tour ===
In late 1971 Graham attempted to qualify for the PGA Tour at PGA Tour Qualifying School. He was successful. In 1976, he won twice on the PGA Tour, and then came from behind to secure a victory over the reigning champion Hale Irwin in the Piccadilly World Match Play Championship at Wentworth Club in England.

Graham won two major championships, the 1979 PGA Championship and the 1981 U.S. Open He also finished third at the 1985 Open Championship, after sharing the third-round lead. He became the fourth Australian major champion (after Jim Ferrier, Peter Thomson and Kel Nagle) and the first to win a U.S. Open. He is the only Australian male golfer to win two different men's major golf championships.

Both of his major victories came in remarkable fashion. In the 1979 PGA Championship, at Oakland Hills, outside Detroit, Michigan, he stood on the last tee at 7 under par for his final round and leading by two, but double-bogeyed the last hole for a 65 to drop back into a playoff with Ben Crenshaw. At each of the first two sudden-death holes he holed long putts to keep the playoff alive and finally won at the third extra hole.

At the 1981 U.S. Open, at Merion Golf Club, just west of Philadelphia, Pennsylvania. Graham shot a 67 in the final round to overturn a three-shot deficit to overnight leader George Burns to win by 3 strokes. In the last round he hit every green in regulation and every fairway except one.

In 1982, Graham was interested in club making and was appointed by Jack Nicklaus as a club designer at MacGregor Golf Company.

=== Senior PGA Tour ===
In 1996, upon turning 50, Graham joined the Senior PGA TOUR. Graham won five times on the tour.

On 27 June 2004, during the final round of the Bank of America Championship in Concord, Massachusetts, Graham collapsed over a putt on the eighth green. He was later diagnosed with congestive heart failure, ending his competitive golf career at age 58.

== Personal life ==
In 1968, Graham married Maureen. They formerly lived in Delray Beach, Florida and then moved to Dallas, Texas. They have two sons.

Graham is now retired and resides in Whitefish, Montana.

== Awards and honors ==
- In 1988, Graham was made a Member of the Order of Australia.
- In 1990, Graham was inducted into the Sport Australia Hall of Fame.
- In 2013, Graham was inducted into the Texas Golf Hall of Fame
- In 2015, Graham was inducted into the World Golf Hall of Fame.

== Professional wins (38) ==
=== PGA Tour wins (8) ===
Legend
Major championships (2)
Other PGA Tour (6)

No.	Date	Tournament	Winning score	To par	Margin of victory	Runner(s)-up
1	3 Jul 1972	Cleveland Open	68-73-68-69=278	−6	Playoff	(Australia) Bruce Devlin
2	18 Jul 1976	American Express Westchester Classic	63-68-70-71=272	−12	3 strokes	(United States) Ben Crenshaw, (United States) Tom Watson, (United States) Fuzzy Zoeller
3	29 Aug 1976	American Golf Classic	69-67-69-69=274	−14	4 strokes	(United States) Lou Graham
4	5 Aug 1979	PGA Championship	69-68-70-65=272	−8	Playoff	(United States) Ben Crenshaw
5	25 May 1980	Memorial Tournament	73-67-70-70=280	−8	1 stroke	(United States) Tom Watson
6	24 Jan 1981	Phoenix Open	65-68-69-66=268	−16	1 stroke	(United States) Lon Hinkle
7	21 Jun 1981	U.S. Open	68-68-70-67=273	−7	3 strokes	(United States) George Burns, (United States) Bill Rogers
8	8 May 1983	Houston Coca-Cola Open	66-72-73-64=275	−9	5 strokes	(United States) Lee Elder, (United States) Jim Thorpe, (United States) Lee Trevino

PGA Tour playoff record (2–1)

No.	Year	Tournament	Opponent(s)	Result
1	1972	Cleveland Open	(Australia) Bruce Devlin	Won with birdie on second extra hole
2	1972	Liggett & Myers Open	(United States) Lou Graham, (United States) Hale Irwin, (United States) Larry Ziegler	L. Graham won with birdie on third extra hole D. Graham and Ziegler eliminated by par on first hole
3	1979	PGA Championship	(United States) Ben Crenshaw	Won with birdie on third extra hole

=== European Tour wins (3) ===
Legend
Major championships (2)
Other European Tour (1)

No.	Date	Tournament	Winning score	To par	Margin of victory	Runner(s)-up
1	5 Aug 1979	PGA Championship	69-68-70-65=272	−8	Playoff	(United States) Ben Crenshaw
2	21 Jun 1981	U.S. Open	68-68-70-67=273	−7	3 strokes	(United States) George Burns, (United States) Bill Rogers
3	24 Oct 1982	Trophée Lancôme	66-70-70-70=276	−12	2 strokes	(Spain) Seve Ballesteros

European Tour playoff record (1–0)

No.	Year	Tournament	Opponent	Result
1	1979	PGA Championship	(United States) Ben Crenshaw	Won with birdie on third extra hole

=== Other European wins (3) ===
No.	Date	Tournament	Winning score	To par	Margin of victory	Runner(s)-up
1	July 1970	French Open	268		1 stroke	(France) Jean Garaïalde (Argentina) Florentino Molina
2	9 Oct 1976	Piccadilly World Match Play Championship	38 holes			(United States) Hale Irwin
3	18 Oct 1981	Trophée Lancôme	71-72-67-70=280	−8	5 strokes	(Japan) Isao Aoki, (Scotland) Sandy Lyle

=== PGA of Japan Tour wins (1) ===
No.	Date	Tournament	Winning score	To par	Margin of victory	Runner-up
1	2 May 1976	Chunichi Crowns	72-68-69-67=276	−4	1 stroke	(Japan) Yasuhiro Miyamoto

PGA of Japan Tour playoff record (0–1)

No.	Year	Tournament	Opponent	Result
1	1985	Taiheiyo Club Masters	(Japan) Tsuneyuki Nakajima	Lost to birdie on first extra hole

=== Other Japan wins (2) ===
- 1971 Japan Airlines Open
- 1980 Rolex Japan

=== Asia Golf Circuit wins (2) ===
No.	Date	Tournament	Winning score	To par	Margin of victory	Runner-up
1	22 Mar 1970	Thailand Open	74-72-71-69=286	−2	1 stroke	(Taiwan) Hsieh Min-Nan
2	19 Apr 1970	Yomiuri International	71-71-75-69=286	−2	3 strokes	(New Zealand) Walter Godfrey

Asia Golf Circuit playoff record (0–1)

No.	Year	Tournament	Opponents	Result
1	1969	Singapore Open	(Japan) Tomio Kamata, (England) Guy Wolstenholme	Kamata won with birdie on third extra hole Wolstenholme eliminated by par on first hole

=== PGA Tour of Australia wins (5) ===
No.	Date	Tournament	Winning score	To par	Margin of victory	Runner(s)-up
1	26 Oct 1975	Wills Masters	71-70-69-72=282	−8	2 strokes	(Australia) Rob McNaughton
2	20 Nov 1977	Australian Open	74-71-68-71=284	−4	3 strokes	(United States) Don January, (United States) Bruce Lietzke, (New Zealand) John Lister
3	28 Oct 1979	CBA West Lakes Classic	72-70-72-71=285	−3	2 strokes	(Australia) Bob Shearer, (United States) Gary Vanier
4	13 Oct 1985	Stefan Queensland Open	66-64-69-70=269	−19	5 strokes	(Australia) Paul Foley
5	11 Oct 1987	Konica Queensland Open (2)	69-71-69-66=275	−13	7 strokes	(Australia) Vaughan Somers

PGA Tour of Australia playoff record (0–1)

No.	Year	Tournament	Opponent	Result
1	1983	National Panasonic New South Wales Open	(Australia) Greg Norman	Lost to par on second extra hole

=== Other Australian wins (5) ===
- 1967 Queensland PGA Championship
- 1969 South Lakes (Goolwa, South Australia)
- 1970 Tasmanian Open, Victorian Open
- 1994 Australian Skins

=== New Zealand Golf Circuit wins (1) ===
No.	Date	Tournament	Winning score	To par	Margin of victory	Runner-up
1	2 Dec 1979	Air New Zealand Shell Open	70-67-69-73=279	−5	8 strokes	(Australia) Rodger Davis

=== Caribbean Tour wins (1) ===
- 1971 Caracas Open

=== Other Latin American wins (3) ===
- 1978 Mexico Cup
- 1980 Mexican Open, Heublein Open (Brazil)

=== Other wins (1) ===
No.	Date	Tournament	Winning score	To par	Margin of victory	Runner(s)-up
1	15 Nov 1970	World Cup (with (Australia) Bruce Devlin)	131-136-131-146=544	−32	10 strokes	Argentina − Roberto De Vicenzo and Vicente Fernández

=== Senior PGA Tour wins (5) ===
No.	Date	Tournament	Winning score	To par	Margin of victory	Runner(s)-up
1	16 Feb 1997	GTE Classic	71-68-65=204	−9	3 strokes	(United States) Bob Dickson
2	30 Mar 1997	Southwestern Bell Dominion	68-69-69=206	−10	1 stroke	(United States) John Jacobs
3	21 Sep 1997	Comfort Classic	67-68-65=200	−16	1 stroke	(United States) Buddy Allin, (United States) Larry Nelson
4	1 Feb 1998	Royal Caribbean Classic	67-68-67=202	−11	Playoff	(United States) Dave Stockton
5	17 Oct 1999	Raley's Gold Rush Classic	63-71-65=199	−17	4 strokes	(United States) Larry Mowry

Senior PGA Tour playoff record (1–1)

No.	Year	Tournament	Opponent(s)	Result
1	1996	Emerald Coast Classic	(United States) Bob Eastwood, (United States) Mike Hill, (United States) Dave Stockton, (United States) Lee Trevino	Trevino won with birdie on first extra hole
2	1998	Royal Caribbean Classic	(United States) Dave Stockton	Won with birdie on tenth extra hole

== Major championships ==
=== Wins (2) ===
Year	Championship	54 holes	Winning score	Margin	Runner(s)-up
1979	PGA Championship	4 shot deficit	−8 (69–68–70–65=272)	Playoff^{1}	(United States) Ben Crenshaw
1981	U.S. Open	3 shot deficit	−7 (68–68–70–67=273)	3 strokes	(United States) George Burns, (United States) Bill Rogers

^{1}Defeated Crenshaw with birdie on third extra hole.

=== Results timeline ===
Tournament	1970	1971	1972	1973	1974	1975	1976	1977	1978	1979
Masters Tournament		T36	CUT	T29				T6	T9	WD
U.S. Open	CUT	CUT	T47	T58	T18	T29	CUT	CUT	CUT	7
The Open Championship	T32	CUT			T11	T28	T21	CUT	T39	
PGA Championship			CUT	CUT		10	T4	CUT	CUT	1

Tournament	1980	1981	1982	1983	1984	1985	1986	1987	1988	1989
Masters Tournament	5	7	19	46	T6	T10	T28	T27		
U.S. Open	T47	1	T6	T8	T21	T23	T15	T51	T47	T61
The Open Championship	T29	T14	T27	T14	CUT	T3	T11	34	CUT	T61
PGA Championship	T26	T43	T49	T14	T48	T32	T7	CUT	T17	CUT

Tournament	1990	1991	1992	1993	1994	1995
Masters Tournament						
U.S. Open	64	60				
The Open Championship	T8	CUT				
PGA Championship	T66	T52		CUT	CUT	CUT

Win
Top 10
Did not play

CUT = missed the halfway cut (3rd round cut in 1971, 1977 and 1984 Open Championships)
WD = withdrew
"T" indicates a tie for a place.

=== Summary ===
Tournament	Wins	2nd	3rd	Top-5	Top-10	Top-25	Events	Cuts made
Masters Tournament	0	0	0	1	6	7	14	12
U.S. Open	1	0	0	1	4	8	22	17
The Open Championship	0	0	1	1	2	7	19	14
PGA Championship	1	0	0	2	4	6	22	13
Totals	2	0	1	5	16	28	77	56

- Most consecutive cuts made – 20 (1979 U.S. Open – 1984 U.S. Open)
- Longest streak of top-10s – 3 (1979 U.S. Open – 1980 Masters)

== Team appearances ==
- World Cup (representing Australia): 1970 (winners), 1971
- Dunhill Cup (representing Australia): 1985 (winners), 1986 (winners), 1988
- Nissan Cup (representing Australasia): 1985, 1986

== See also ==
- 1971 PGA Tour Qualifying School graduates
