= 1976 Piccadilly World Match Play Championship =

Coordinates: 51°23′48″N 0°35′45″W

Tournament information
- Dates: 7–9 October 1976
- Location: Virginia Water, Surrey, England
- Course(s): West Course, Wentworth
- Format: Match play – 36 holes

Statistics
- Par: 73
- Length: 6,969 yards (6,372 m)
- Field: 8 players
- Prize fund: £75,000
- Winner's share: £25,000

Champion
- (Australia) David Graham
- def. Hale Irwin after 38 holes

The 1976 Piccadilly World Match Play Championship was the 13th World Match Play Championship. It was played from Thursday 7 to Saturday 9 October on the West Course at Wentworth. Eight players competed in a straight knock-out competition, with each match contested over 36 holes. There was a large increase in the prize money with the champion receiving £25,000 compared to £10,000 the previous year. In the final, David Graham beat defending champion Hale Irwin after 38 holes.

For the first time there was a play-off between the losing semi-finalists for third place. It was played over 36 holes and was won by Gary Player.

This was the last World Match Play Championship sponsored under the Piccadilly name.

== Course ==
Hole	1	2	3	4	5	6	7	8	9	Out	10	11	12	13	14	15	16	17	18	In	Total
Yards	471	155	452	501	191	344	399	398	460	3,371	186	376	483	441	179	480	380	571	502	3,598	6,969
Par	4	3	4	5	3	4	4	4	4	35	3	4	5	4	3	5	4	5	5	38	73

== Scores ==
Quarter-finals; 7 October
(United States) Hale Irwin	2 & 1
(Spain) Seve Ballesteros
(South Africa) Gary Player	5 & 4
(United States) Arnold Palmer
(Australia) David Graham	3 & 2
(United States) Hubert Green
(United States) Raymond Floyd	2 up
(Scotland) Brian Barnes

Semi-finals; 8 October
(United States) Hale Irwin	2 up
(South Africa) Gary Player
(Australia) David Graham	1 up
(United States) Raymond Floyd

Final; 9 October
(United States) Hale Irwin
(Australia) David Graham	38 h
Third place
(South Africa) Gary Player	7 & 5
(United States) Raymond Floyd

== Prize money ==
The winner received £25,000, the runner-up £15,000, third place £8,500, fourth place £6,500 and the first round losers £5,000, making a total prize fund of £75,000.
