= John Schroeder (golfer) =

American professional golfer (born 1945)

Personal information
- Full name: John Lawrence Schroeder
- Nationality: United States
- Born: November 12, 1945 (age 80) Great Barrington, Massachusetts, U.S.
- Height: 5 ft 10 in (1.78 m)
- Weight: 160 lb (73 kg; 11 st)

Career
- Sport: Golf
- College: University of Michigan
- Turned professional: 1969
- Former tours: PGA Tour; Champions Tour
- Professional wins: 3

Number of wins by tour
- PGA Tour: 1
- PGA Tour Champions: 1
- Other: 1

Best results in major championships
- Masters Tournament: T24: 1982
- PGA Championship: T12: 1978
- U.S. Open: T4: 1981
- The Open Championship: T7: 1978

Achievements and awards
- Senior PGA Tour Comeback Player of the Year: 2001

John Lawrence Schroeder (born November 12, 1945) is an American professional golfer who played on the PGA Tour and Champions Tour.

== Early life and amateur career ==
Schroeder was born in Great Barrington, Massachusetts, the son of tennis great Ted Schroeder. He attended the University of Michigan and was a member of the golf team, an All-American in 1968.

== Professional career ==
In 1969, Schroeder turned pro. He had thirty-five top-10 finishes in PGA Tour events including a win at the 1973 U.S. Professional Match Play Championship. In the middle of his career, he also had some success in Europe. He led the 1977 Open Championship after the first round and finished in the top-10. His good play in Europe continued the following week at the Swiss Open where he finished runner-up to Seve Ballesteros. He recorded another top-10 at the 1978 Open Championship. At the end of regulation, he finished the 1979 Bay Hill Citrus Classic tied for first place; however, he lost in a playoff to Bob Byman. He recorded T-4 place finish at the 1981 U.S. Open, his best finish ever in a major championship. He did not play full-time on the PGA Tour after the 1982 season.

Schroeder spent most of his late thirties and forties working as an on-course reporter and analyst for ABC Sports, ESPN and NBC Sports.

Shortly before he turned 50 he played some on the PGA Tour and Nike Tour to prepare for the Senior PGA TOUR. He played in six PGA Tour events and nine Nike Tour events. His best finish was a solo 5th in the 1995 Nike Utah Classic. He joined the senior tour in 1996. In 2001, Schroeder won the NFL Golf Classic and the Champions Tour Comeback Player of the Year award.

Schroeder achieved great financial success as one of the original owners of Cobra Golf.

== Awards and honors ==
- In 1968, Schroeder earned All-American honors
- In 1992, Schroeder was inducted into the University of Michigan Athletic Hall of Honor
- In 2001, Schroeder earned Comeback Player of the Year award for the Champions Tour

== Personal life ==
Schroeder lives in Del Mar, California.

== Professional wins (3) ==
=== PGA Tour wins (1) ===
No.	Date	Tournament	Winning score	Margin of victory	Runner-up
1	Aug 26, 1973	U.S. Professional Match Play Championship	2 up		(United States) DeWitt Weaver

PGA Tour playoff record (0–1)

No.	Year	Tournament	Opponent	Result
1	1979	Bay Hill Citrus Classic	(United States) Bob Byman	Lost to par on second extra hole

=== Other wins (1) ===
- 1981 Rover Open (France)

=== Senior PGA Tour wins (1) ===
No.	Date	Tournament	Winning score	Margin of victory	Runner-up
1	Jun 10, 2001	NFL Golf Classic	−9 (69-70-68=207)	Playoff	(United States) Allen Doyle

Senior PGA Tour playoff record (1–1)

No.	Year	Tournament	Opponent(s)	Result
1	1996	Bell Atlantic Classic	(United States) Dale Douglass, (United States) Tom Wargo	Douglass won with birdie on third extra hole
2	2001	NFL Golf Classic	(United States) Allen Doyle	Won with par on second extra hole

== Results in major championships ==
Tournament	1970	1971	1972	1973	1974	1975	1976	1977	1978	1979	1980	1981	1982	1983
Masters Tournament					CUT								T24	CUT
U.S. Open	CUT	T27	T47	CUT	CUT					CUT		T4	CUT	
The Open Championship								T9	T7	T41				
PGA Championship		T22						T19	T12	T21		CUT		

Top 10
Did not play

CUT = missed the half-way cut
"T" = tied

== See also ==
- Spring 1969 PGA Tour Qualifying School graduates
- University of Michigan Athletic Hall of Honor
