= 1978 Open Championship =

Coordinates: 56.343°N 2.803°W

Tournament information
- Dates: 12–15 July 1978
- Location: St Andrews, Scotland
- Course: Old Course at St Andrews
- Organized by: The Royal and Ancient Golf Club of St Andrews
- Tour(s): European Tour; PGA Tour

Statistics
- Par: 72
- Length: 6,933 yards (6,340 m)
- Field: 155 players 80 after 1st cut 64 after 2nd cut
- Cut: 148 (+4) (1st cut); 222 (+6) (2nd cut)
- Prize fund: £125,000 $237,500
- Winner's share: £12,500 $23,750

Champion
- (United States) Jack Nicklaus
- 281 (−7)

Location in Scotland
Location in Fife, Scotland

The 1978 Open Championship was the 107th Open Championship, held 12–15 July over the Old Course at St Andrews, Fife, Scotland. Jack Nicklaus won his third and final Open championship, two strokes ahead of runners-up Ben Crenshaw, Raymond Floyd, Tom Kite, and Simon Owen. It was the fifteenth of his eighteen major championships and marked the completion of his third career grand slam.

Defending champion Tom Watson was a co-leader after 54 holes, but four consecutive bogeys on the front nine led to a 76 (+4). Watson finished six strokes back in a tie for fourteenth place.

== Course ==
Hole	Name	Yards	Par	Hole	Name	Yards	Par
1	Burn	370	4	10	Bobby Jones	342	4
2	Dyke	411	4	11	High (In)	172	3
3	Cartgate (Out)	371	4	12	Heathery (In)	316	4
4	Ginger Beer	463	4	13	Hole O'Cross (In)	425	4
5	Hole O'Cross (Out)	564	5	14	Long	567	5
6	Heathery (Out)	416	4	15	Cartgate (In)	413	4
7	High (Out)	372	4	16	Corner of the Dyke	382	4
8	Short	178	3	17	Road	461	4
9	End	356	4	18	Tom Morris	354	4
Out		3,501	36	In		3,432	36
Source:				Total		6,933	72

Previous lengths of the course for The Open Championship (since 1950):

- 6,957 yards (6,361 m) - 1970:
- 6,926 yards (6,333 m) - 1964
- 6,936 yards (6,342 m) - 1960, 1955

== Round summaries ==
=== First round ===
Wednesday, 12 July 1978

Place	Player	Score	To par
1	(Japan) Isao Aoki	68	−4
T2	(Spain) Seve Ballesteros	69	−3
T2	(United States) Raymond Floyd	69	−3
T2	(Australia) Jack Newton	69	−3
T2	(United States) Tom Weiskopf	69	−3
T6	(England) Howard Clark	70	−2
T6	(United States) Ben Crenshaw	70	−2
T6	(United States) Mark Hayes	70	−2
T6	(England) Carl Mason	70	−2
T6	(Scotland) Mike Miller (a)	70	−2
T6	(Japan) Tsuneyuki Nakajima	70	−2
T6	(New Zealand) Simon Owen	70	−2

=== Second round ===
Thursday, 13 July 1978

Place	Player	Score	To par
T1	(Japan) Isao Aoki	68-71=139	−5
T1	(Spain) Seve Ballesteros	69-70=139	−5
T1	(United States) Ben Crenshaw	70-69=139	−5
T4	(England) Gary Cullen	73-67=140	−4
T4	(Australia) Bob Shearer	71-69=139	−4
T6	(United States) Bob Byman	72-69=141	−3
T6	(United States) Tom Kite	72-69=141	−3
T6	(Japan) Tsuneyuki Nakajima	70-71=141	−3
T6	(Japan) Masashi Ozaki	72-69=141	−3
T6	(United States) Tom Watson	73-68=141	−3
T6	(United States) Tom Weiskopf	69-72=141	−3

Amateurs: Miller (E), Brodie (+1), McEvoy (+1), Godwin (+3), Gallagher (+6), Kuramoto (+6), Lewis (+8), Webster (+9), Hedges (+11), Fish, (+14), McLachlan (+14), Turner (+14), Walters (+18).

=== Third round ===
Friday, 14 July 1978

Place	Player	Score	To par
T1	(England) Peter Oosterhuis	72-70-69=211	−5
T1	(United States) Tom Watson	73-68-70=211	−5
T3	(New Zealand) Simon Owen	70-75-67=212	−4
T3	(United States) Jack Nicklaus	71-72-69=212	−4
T3	(United States) Ben Crenshaw	70-69-73=212	−4
T3	(Japan) Isao Aoki	68-71-73=212	−4
T7	(England) Nick Faldo	71-72-70=213	−3
T7	(United States) John Schroeder	74-69-70=213	−3
T7	(United States) Tom Kite	72-69-72=213	−3
T7	(United States) Tom Weiskopf	69-72-72=213	−3

Amateurs: Miller (+2), Brodie (+4), McEvoy (+5), Godwin (+6).

=== Final round ===
Saturday, 15 July 1978

Champion
Silver Medal winner (low amateur)
(a) = amateur
(c) = past champion

Place	Player	Score	To par	Money (£)
1	(United States) Jack Nicklaus (c)	71-72-69-69=281	−7	17,500
T2	(United States) Ben Crenshaw	70-69-73-71=283	−5	10,237
T2	(United States) Raymond Floyd	69-75-71-68=283	−5	10,237
T2	(United States) Tom Kite	72-69-72-70=283	−5	10,237
T2	(New Zealand) Simon Owen	70-75-67-71=283	−5	10,237
6	(England) Peter Oosterhuis	72-70-69-73=284	−4	7,000
T7	(Japan) Isao Aoki	68-71-73-73=285	−3	5,512
T7	(England) Nick Faldo	71-72-70-72=285	−3	5,512
T7	(United States) John Schroeder	74-69-70-72=285	−3	5,512
T7	(Australia) Bob Shearer	71-69-74-71=285	−3	5,512

Leaderboard below the top 10
Place	Player	Score	To par	Money (£)
T11	(Australia) Michael Cahill	71-72-75-68=286	−2	3,905
T11	(South Africa) Dale Hayes	74-70-71-71=286	−2	3,905
T11	(United States) Orville Moody	73-69-74-70=286	−2	3,905
T14	(United States) Mark Hayes	70-75-75-67=287	−1	3,360
T14	(Japan) Jumbo Ozaki	72-69-75-71=287	−1	3,360
T14	(United States) Tom Watson (c)	73-68-70-76=287	−1	3,360
T17	(Spain) Seve Ballesteros	69-70-76-73=288	E	2,240
T17	(United States) Bob Byman	72-69-74-73=288	E	2,240
T17	(England) Guy Hunt	71-73-71-73=288	E	2,240
T17	(Japan) Tommy Nakajima	70-71-76-71=288	E	2,240
T17	(United States) Tom Weiskopf (c)	69-72-72-75=288	E	2,240
T22	(Scotland) Bernard Gallacher	72-71-76-70=289	+1	1,330
T22	(England) Nick Job	73-75-68-73=289	+1	1,330
T24	(Spain) Antonio Garrido	73-71-76-70=290	+2	959
T24	(United States) Hale Irwin	75-71-76-68=290	+2	959
T24	(England) Carl Mason	70-74-72-74=290	+2	959
T24	(Australia) Jack Newton	69-76-71-74=290	+2	959
T24	(Australia) Peter Thomson (c)	72-70-72-76=290	+2	959

Amateurs: McEvoy (+5), Miller (+6), Brodie (+7), Godwin (+10). Source:

- The exchange rate at the time was approximately 1.88 dollars (US) per pound sterling.
