= 1980 PGA Tour =

Golf tour season

1980 PGA Tour season
- Duration: January 10, 1980 – October 19, 1980
- Number of official events: 44
- Most wins: (United States) Tom Watson (7)
- Money list: (United States) Tom Watson
- PGA Player of the Year: (United States) Tom Watson
- Rookie of the Year: (United States) Gary Hallberg

The 1980 PGA Tour was the 65th season of the PGA Tour, the main professional golf tour in the United States. It was also the 12th season since separating from the PGA of America.

== Schedule ==
The following table lists official events during the 1980 season.

| Date | Tournament | Location | Purse (US$) | Winner(s) (Note: The number in parentheses after each winner's name is the number of PGA Tour events they had won up to and including that tournament. This information is only shown for PGA Tour members.) | Notes |
|---|---|---|---|---|---|
| Jan 13 | Bob Hope Desert Classic | California | 250,000 | (United States) Craig Stadler (1) | Pro-Am |
| Jan 20 | Phoenix Open | Arizona | 300,000 | (United States) Jeff Mitchell (1) | |
| Jan 27 | Andy Williams-San Diego Open Invitational | California | 250,000 | (United States) Tom Watson (19) | |
| Feb 3 | Bing Crosby National Pro-Am | California | 300,000 | (United States) George Burns (2) | Pro-Am |
| Feb 10 | Hawaiian Open | Hawaii | 325,000 | (United States) Andy Bean (6) | |
| Feb 19 | Joe Garagiola-Tucson Open | Arizona | 300,000 | (United States) Jim Colbert (6) | |
| Feb 24 | Glen Campbell-Los Angeles Open | California | 250,000 | (United States) Tom Watson (20) | |
| Mar 2 | Bay Hill Classic | Florida | 300,000 | (United States) Dave Eichelberger (3) | |
| Mar 9 | Jackie Gleason-Inverrary Classic | Florida | 300,000 | (United States) Johnny Miller (19) | |
| Mar 16 | Doral-Eastern Open | Florida | 250,000 | (United States) Raymond Floyd (12) | |
| Mar 23 | Tournament Players Championship | Florida | 440,000 | (United States) Lee Trevino (25) | Special event |
| Mar 30 | Sea Pines Heritage | South Carolina | 300,000 | (United States) Doug Tewell (1) | Invitational |
| Apr 6 | Greater Greensboro Open | North Carolina | 250,000 | (United States) Craig Stadler (2) | |
| Apr 13 | Masters Tournament | Georgia | 360,000 | (Spain) Seve Ballesteros (3) | Major championship |
| Apr 13 | Magnolia Classic | Mississippi | 25,000 | (United States) Roger Maltbie (n/a) | Second Tour (Note: Official money; unofficial win.) |
| Apr 20 | MONY Tournament of Champions | California | 300,000 | (United States) Tom Watson (21) | Winners-only event |
| Apr 20 | Tallahassee Open | Florida | 100,000 | (United States) Mark Pfeil (1) | Alternate event |
| Apr 27 | Greater New Orleans Open | Louisiana | 250,000 | (United States) Tom Watson (22) | |
| May 4 | Michelob-Houston Open | Texas | 350,000 | (United States) Curtis Strange (2) | |
| May 11 | Byron Nelson Golf Classic | Texas | 300,000 | (United States) Tom Watson (23) | |
| May 18 | Colonial National Invitation | Texas | 300,000 | (United States) Bruce Lietzke (5) | Invitational |
| May 25 | Memorial Tournament | Ohio | 300,000 | (Australia) David Graham (5) | Invitational |
| Jun 1 | Kemper Open | Maryland | 400,000 | (United States) John Mahaffey (5) | |
| Jun 8 | Atlanta Classic | Georgia | 300,000 | (United States) Larry Nelson (3) | |
| Jun 15 | U.S. Open | New Jersey | 355,000 | (United States) Jack Nicklaus (69) | Major championship |
| Jun 22 | Canadian Open | Canada | 350,000 | (United States) Bob Gilder (2) | |
| Jun 29 | Danny Thomas Memphis Classic | Tennessee | 300,000 | (United States) Lee Trevino (26) | |
| Jul 6 | Western Open | Illinois | 300,000 | (United States) Scott Simpson (1) | |
| Jul 13 | Greater Milwaukee Open | Wisconsin | 200,000 | (United States) Billy Kratzert (3) | |
| Jul 20 | The Open Championship | Scotland | £200,000 | (United States) Tom Watson (24) | Major championship (Note: Unofficial money event at the time, but retrospectively counted as an official win.) |
| Jul 20 | Quad Cities Open | Illinois | 200,000 | (United States) Scott Hoch (1) | |
| Jul 27 | Sammy Davis Jr.-Greater Hartford Open | Connecticut | 300,000 | (United States) Howard Twitty (2) | |
| Aug 3 | IVB-Golf Classic | Pennsylvania | 250,000 | (United States) Doug Tewell (2) | |
| Aug 10 | PGA Championship | New York | 375,000 | (United States) Jack Nicklaus (70) | Major championship |
| Aug 17 | Manufacturers Hanover Westchester Classic | New York | 400,000 | (United States) Curtis Strange (3) | |
| Aug 24 | World Series of Golf | Ohio | 400,000 | (United States) Tom Watson (25) | Limited-field event |
| Aug 24 | Buick-Goodwrench Open | Michigan | 250,000 | (United States) Peter Jacobsen (1) | Alternate event |
| Aug 31 | B.C. Open | New York | 275,000 | (United States) Don Pooley (1) | |
| Sep 7 | Pleasant Valley Jimmy Fund Classic | Massachusetts | 300,000 | (United States) Wayne Levi (3) | |
| Sep 14 | Hall of Fame | North Carolina | 250,000 | (United States) Phil Hancock (1) | |
| Sep 21 | San Antonio Texas Open | Texas | 250,000 | (United States) Lee Trevino (27) | |
| Sep 28 | Anheuser-Busch Golf Classic | California | 300,000 | (United States) Ben Crenshaw (8) | |
| Oct 5 | Southern Open | Georgia | 200,000 | (United States) Mike Sullivan (1) | |
| Oct 12 | Pensacola Open | Florida | 200,000 | (Canada) Dan Halldorson (1) | |
| Oct 19 | Walt Disney World National Team Championship | Florida | 350,000 | (United States) Danny Edwards (2) and (United States) David Edwards (1) | Team event |

=== Unofficial events ===
The following events were sanctioned by the PGA Tour, but did not carry official money, nor were wins official.

| Date | Tournament | Location | Purse ($) | Winner(s) | Notes |
|---|---|---|---|---|---|
| Dec 6 | JCPenney Mixed Team Classic | Florida | 550,000 | (United States) Nancy Lopez and (United States) Curtis Strange | Team event |
| Dec 14 | World Cup | Colombia | n/a | (Canada) Dan Halldorson and (Canada) Jim Nelford | Team event |
| Dec 14 | World Cup Individual Trophy | Colombia | n/a | (Scotland) Sandy Lyle | |

== Money list ==
The money list was based on prize money won during the season, calculated in U.S. dollars.

| Position | Player | Prize money ($) |
|---|---|---|
| 1 | (United States) Tom Watson | 530,808 |
| 2 | (United States) Lee Trevino | 385,814 |
| 3 | (United States) Curtis Strange | 271,888 |
| 4 | (United States) Andy Bean | 269,033 |
| 5 | (United States) Ben Crenshaw | 237,727 |
| 6 | (United States) Jerry Pate | 222,976 |
| 7 | (United States) George Burns | 219,928 |
| 8 | (United States) Craig Stadler | 206,291 |
| 9 | (United States) Mike Reid | 206,097 |
| 10 | (United States) Raymond Floyd | 192,993 |

== Awards ==
| Award | Winner | Ref. |
|---|---|---|
| PGA Player of the Year | (United States) Tom Watson | |
| Rookie of the Year | (United States) Gary Hallberg | |
| Scoring leader (PGA Tour – Byron Nelson Award) | (United States) Lee Trevino | |
| Scoring leader (PGA – Vardon Trophy) | (United States) Lee Trevino | |

== See also ==
- 1980 Senior PGA Tour
