= New England Classic =

Golf tournament formerly on the PGA Tour

CVS Charity Classic
Tournament information
- Location: Sutton, Massachusetts
- Established: 1969
- Course: Pleasant Valley Country Club
- Par: 71
- Length: 7,110 yards (6,500 m)
- Tour: PGA Tour
- Format: Stroke play
- Prize fund: US$1,500,000
- Month played: July
- Final year: 1998

Tournament record score
- Aggregate: 266 Loren Roberts (1997)
- To par: −18 as above

Final champion
- (United States) Steve Pate
- Location in the United States Location in Massachusetts

The New England Classic was a golf tournament on the PGA Tour from 1969 through 1998. It was held under various names at Pleasant Valley Country Club in Sutton, Massachusetts.

== Tournament highlights ==
- 1975: Roger Maltbie wins for the second consecutive week on the PGA Tour. He beats Mac McLendon by one shot. Afterwards, Maltbie left his $40,000 winner's check behind in a bar.
- 1977: Due to the PGA Tour labeling it a 'designated event', Jack Nicklaus plays in the tournament for the first and only time. He finishes in second place two shots behind winner Raymond Floyd.
- 1978: One week after winning the PGA Championship, John Mahaffey also takes home the American Optical Classic title. He beats defending champion Raymond Floyd and the PGA Tour's only optometrist, Gil Morgan, by two shots.
- 1986: Gene Sauers defeats Blaine McCallister on the third hole of a sudden death playoff for his first ever PGA Tour title after having to hole a par chip on the first playoff hole to avoid elimination.
- 1989: Three years after suffering a tough luck playoff loss at Pleasant Valley, Blaine McCallister birdies the final two holes to win the 21st edition of the tournament by one shot over Brad Faxon.
- 1998: Steve Pate wins the last edition of the tournament. He beat Scott Hoch and Bradley Hughes by one shot. For Pate it was his first victory since a 1996 car accident.

== Winners ==
Year	Winner	Score	To par	Margin of victory	Runner(s)-up
CVS Charity Classic
1998	(United States) Steve Pate	269	−15	1 stroke	(United States) Scott Hoch (Australia) Bradley Hughes
1997	(United States) Loren Roberts	266	−18	1 stroke	(United States) Bill Glasson
1996	(United States) John Cook	268	−16	3 strokes	(United States) Russ Cochran
Ideon Classic at Pleasant Valley
1995	(United States) Fred Funk	268	−16	1 stroke	(United States) Jim McGovern
New England Classic
1994	(United States) Kenny Perry	268	−16	1 stroke	(Northern Ireland) David Feherty
1993	(United States) Paul Azinger	268	−16	4 strokes	(United States) Jay Delsing (United States) Bruce Fleisher
1992	(United States) Brad Faxon	268	−16	2 strokes	(United States) Phil Mickelson
1991	(United States) Bruce Fleisher	268	−16	Playoff	(Australia) Ian Baker-Finch
Bank of Boston Classic
1990	(United States) Morris Hatalsky	275	−9	1 stroke	(United States) Scott Verplank
1989	(United States) Blaine McCallister	271	−13	1 stroke	(United States) Brad Faxon
1988	(United States) Mark Calcavecchia	274	−10	1 stroke	(United States) Don Pooley
1987	(United States) Sam Randolph	199 (Note: Shortened to 54 holes due to rain.)	−14	4 strokes	(Australia) Wayne Grady (United States) Gene Sauers (Canada) Ray Stewart
1986	(United States) Gene Sauers	274	−10	Playoff	(United States) Blaine McCallister
1985	(United States) George Burns	267	−17	6 strokes	(United States) John Mahaffey (United States) Jodie Mudd (Australia) Greg Norman (United States) Leonard Thompson
1984	(United States) George Archer	270	−14	6 strokes	(United States) Frank Conner (United States) Joey Sindelar
1983	(United States) Mark Lye	273	−11	1 stroke	(United States) John Mahaffey (United States) Sammy Rachels (United States) Jim Thorpe
1982	(United States) Bob Gilder	271	−13	2 strokes	(United States) Fuzzy Zoeller
Pleasant Valley Jimmy Fund Classic
1981	(United States) Jack Renner	273	−11	2 strokes	(United States) Scott Simpson
1980	(United States) Wayne Levi	273	−11	Playoff	(United States) Gil Morgan
American Optical Classic
1979	(United States) Lou Graham	275	−9	1 stroke	(United States) Ben Crenshaw
1978	(United States) John Mahaffey	270	−14	2 strokes	(United States) Raymond Floyd (United States) Gil Morgan
Pleasant Valley Classic
1977	(United States) Raymond Floyd	271	−13	1 stroke	(United States) Jack Nicklaus
1976	(United States) Buddy Allin	277	−7	1 stroke	(United States) Ben Crenshaw
1975	(United States) Roger Maltbie	276	−8	1 stroke	(United States) Mac McLendon
1974	(Mexico) Victor Regalado	278	−6	1 stroke	(United States) Tom Weiskopf
USI Classic
1973	(United States) Lanny Wadkins	279	−9	2 strokes	(United States) Lee Elder (United States) Tom Jenkins (United States) Rik Massengale
1972	(Australia) Bruce Devlin	275	−13	3 strokes	(United States) Lee Elder
Massachusetts Classic
1971	(United States) Dave Stockton	275	−13	1 stroke	(United States) Raymond Floyd
AVCO Golf Classic
1970	(United States) Billy Casper	277	−11	3 strokes	(United States) Rod Funseth (United States) Tom Weiskopf
1969	(United States) Tom Shaw	280	−4	1 stroke	(Australia) Bob Stanton

== See also ==
- CVS Caremark Charity Classic - an unofficial PGA Tour event that used the CVS Charity Classic name
- Deutsche Bank Championship - a PGA Tour event held in greater Boston since 2003.
