= Ed Fiori =

American professional golfer (1953–2025)

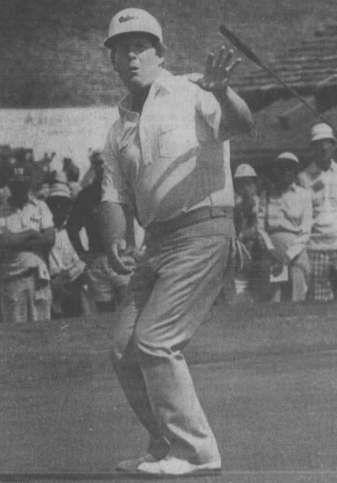
- Fiori in 1985

Personal information
- Full name: Edward Ray Fiori
- Nationality: United States
- Born: April 21, 1953 Lynwood, California, U.S.
- Died: July 6, 2025 (aged 72) Houston, Texas, U.S.
- Height: 5 ft 7 in (1.70 m)
- Weight: 220 lb (100 kg; 16 st)

Career
- Sport: Golf
- College: University of Houston
- Turned professional: 1977
- Former tours: PGA Tour; Champions Tour
- Professional wins: 7

Number of wins by tour
- PGA Tour: 4
- PGA Tour Champions: 1
- Other: 2

Best results in major championships
- Masters Tournament: T6: 1980
- PGA Championship: T9: 1989
- U.S. Open: T35: 1978
- The Open Championship: DNP

Edward Ray Fiori (April 21, 1953 – July 6, 2025) was an American professional golfer who won four times on the PGA Tour and one time on the Champions Tour.

== Early life and amateur career ==
Fiori was born in Lynwood, California. During his childhood, Fiori would sneak through a barbed wire fence to a nine-hole course near his home in Downey, California to practice his game. He attended the University of Houston where he played on the Houston Cougars golf team.

== Professional career ==
In 1977, Fiori turned pro. He joined the PGA Tour after his success at Fall 1977 PGA Tour Qualifying School graduates.

Fiori's first of four tournament wins on the PGA Tour was at the 1979 Southern Open. His last victory at the 1996 Quad City Classic led to the postponement of his plans to retire from the game and become a charter-boat captain. Fiori's previous PGA tour victory was at the 1982 Bob Hope Desert Classic. Fiori beat Tiger Woods at Quad City preventing Woods from gaining his first PGA Tour title. This would be the first of only four times in Woods' career that he would fail to win after holding the 54-hole-lead, all of Woods failure weren't majors until Yang Yong-eun outplayed Woods 13 years later at the 2009 PGA Championship.

== Personal life ==
Fiori had been plagued with weight-related health problems, which led to him undergoing spinal fusion surgery in 2005. He lived in the Houston suburb of Sugar Land, Texas.

Fiori died of cancer on July 6, 2025, at the age of 72.

== Professional wins (7) ==
=== PGA Tour wins (4) ===
No.	Date	Tournament	Winning score	Margin of victory	Runner(s)-up
1	Oct 14, 1979	Southern Open	−14 (69-72-65-68=274)	Playoff	(United States) Tom Weiskopf
2	Jul 5, 1981	Western Open	−11 (74-67-69-67=277)	4 strokes	(United States) Jim Colbert, (United States) Greg Powers, (United States) Jim Simons
3	Jan 17, 1982	Bob Hope Desert Classic	−25 (70-65-66-67-67=335)	Playoff	(United States) Tom Kite
4	Sep 15, 1996	Quad City Classic	−12 (66-68-67-67=268)	2 strokes	(United States) Andrew Magee

PGA Tour playoff record (2–0)

No.	Year	Tournament	Opponent	Result
1	1979	Southern Open	(United States) Tom Weiskopf	Won with birdie on second extra hole
2	1982	Bob Hope Desert Classic	(United States) Tom Kite	Won with birdie on second extra hole

=== Other wins (2) ===
- 1981 Southern California Open
- 1984 Jerry Ford Invitational

=== Champions Tour wins (1) ===
No.	Date	Tournament	Winning score	Margin of victory	Runner-up
1	Mar 7, 2004	MasterCard Classic	−6 (72-71-67=210)	Playoff	(Australia) Graham Marsh

Champions Tour playoff record (1–0)

No.	Year	Tournament	Opponent	Result
1	2004	MasterCard Classic	(Australia) Graham Marsh	Won with par on third extra hole

== Results in major championships ==
Tournament	1978	1979	1980	1981	1982	1983	1984	1985	1986	1987	1988	1989
Masters Tournament			T6	CUT	CUT		CUT					
U.S. Open	T35						CUT	T46				CUT
PGA Championship			CUT	T33	T54	T55	CUT	T51			T52	T9

Tournament	1990	1991	1992	1993	1994	1995	1996	1997
Masters Tournament								CUT
U.S. Open								
PGA Championship	T69							CUT

Note: Fiori never played in The Open Championship.

Top 10
Did not play

CUT = missed the half-way cut
"T" = tied

== See also ==
- Fall 1977 PGA Tour Qualifying School graduates
