= Wayne Levi =

American professional golfer (born 1952)

Personal information
- Full name: Wayne John Levi
- Nationality: United States
- Born: February 22, 1952 (age 74) Little Falls, New York, U.S.
- Height: 5 ft 9 in (1.75 m)
- Weight: 165 lb (75 kg; 11.8 st)

Career
- Sport: Golf
- College: State University of New York at Oswego
- Turned professional: 1973
- Current tour: Champions Tour
- Former tour: PGA Tour
- Professional wins: 20
- Highest ranking: 16 (May 5, 1991)

Number of wins by tour
- PGA Tour: 12
- PGA Tour Champions: 2
- Other: 6

Best results in major championships
- Masters Tournament: T11: 1984
- PGA Championship: T16: 1991
- U.S. Open: T25: 1979, 1993
- The Open Championship: DNP

Achievements and awards
- PGA Tour Player of the Year: 1990

Wayne John Levi (born February 22, 1952) is an American professional golfer.

== Early life ==
Levi was born in Little Falls, New York and attended high school in Herkimer, New York. He enrolled at Oswego State University for two years and then the University of South Florida briefly.

== Professional career ==
In 1973, Levi turned professional. He went on to win 12 times on the PGA Tour. His career year was 1990, when he had four wins, finished second on the final money list and was the appointed PGA Tour Player of the Year. After winning the 1990 Canadian Open, Levi advanced to a career best 19th on the Official World Golf Ranking. After the 1990 season, Levi was placed 16th on the PGA Tour All-time-money-list.

He played on the winning U.S. 1991 Ryder Cup team at Kiawa Island, South Carolina. The same year he represented the U.S., together with Joey Sindelar, at the World Cup in Rome, Italy.

From 2002 he played on the Champions Tour where he won twice, in 2003 and 2004.

== Professional wins (20) ==
=== PGA Tour wins (12) ===
No.	Date	Tournament	Winning score	Margin of victory	Runner(s)-up
1	Nov 5, 1978	Walt Disney World National Team Championship (with (United States) Bob Mann)	−34 (64-65-62-63=254)	3 strokes	(United States) Bobby Wadkins and (United States) Lanny Wadkins
2	May 6, 1979	Houston Open	−16 (69-65-63-71=268)	2 strokes	(United States) Mike Brannan
3	Sep 7, 1980	Pleasant Valley Jimmy Fund Classic	−11 (71-71-65-66=273)	Playoff	(United States) Gil Morgan
4	Feb 14, 1982	Hawaiian Open	−11 (72-68-67-70=277)	1 stroke	(United States) Scott Simpson
5	Oct 10, 1982	LaJet Classic	−17 (64-71-68-68=271)	6 strokes	(United States) Thomas Gray
6	Aug 14, 1983	Buick Open	−16 (72-64-71-65=272)	1 stroke	(Japan) Isao Aoki, (United States) Calvin Peete
7	Sep 2, 1984	B.C. Open	−9 (67-71-71-66=275)	1 stroke	(United States) Russ Cochran, (United States) Hal Sutton
8	Jun 23, 1985	Georgia-Pacific Atlanta Golf Classic	−15 (71-68-67-67=273)	Playoff	(United States) Steve Pate
9	May 27, 1990	BellSouth Atlanta Golf Classic (2)	−13 (72-66-68-69=275)	1 stroke	(United States) Keith Clearwater, (United States) Larry Mize, (Zimbabwe) Nick Price
10	Jun 10, 1990	Centel Western Open	−13 (70-66-70-69=275)	4 strokes	(United States) Payne Stewart
11	Jul 1, 1990	Canon Greater Hartford Open	−13 (67-66-67-67=267)	2 strokes	(United States) Mark Calcavecchia, (United States) Brad Fabel, (United States) Rocco Mediate, (United States) Chris Perry
12	Sep 16, 1990	Canadian Open	−10 (68-68-72-70=278)	1 stroke	(Australia) Ian Baker-Finch, (United States) Jim Woodward

PGA Tour playoff record (2–1)

No.	Year	Tournament	Opponent	Result
1	1980	Pleasant Valley Jimmy Fund Classic	(United States) Gil Morgan	Won with par on fourth extra hole
2	1984	Hawaiian Open	(United States) Jack Renner	Lost to par on second extra hole
3	1985	Georgia-Pacific Atlanta Golf Classic	(United States) Steve Pate	Won with birdie on second extra hole

=== Other wins (6) ===
This list may be incomplete

- 1973 New Hampshire Open, Tupper Lake Open
- 1974 Tupper Lake Open
- 1975 Tupper Lake Open, Manchester Open
- 1988 Chrysler Team Championship (with George Burns)

=== Champions Tour wins (2) ===
No.	Date	Tournament	Winning score	Margin of victory	Runner(s)-up
1	Aug 10, 2003	3M Championship	−11 (68-68-69=205)	1 stroke	(United States) Morris Hatalsky, (United States) Gil Morgan
2	Oct 3, 2004	Constellation Energy Classic	−16 (64-68-68=200)	2 strokes	(United States) Hale Irwin

== Playoff record ==
PGA of Japan Tour playoff record (0–1)

No.	Year	Tournament	Opponent	Result
1	1993	Yonex Open Hiroshima	(Japan) Toshiaki Odate	Lost to birdie on second extra hole

== Results in major championships ==
Tournament	1975	1976	1977	1978	1979
Masters Tournament					
U.S. Open	CUT	T28	CUT	T46	T25
PGA Championship					

Tournament	1980	1981	1982	1983	1984	1985	1986	1987	1988	1989
Masters Tournament	CUT	T25	T24	T12	T11	T18	35			
U.S. Open	T45			T43	WD	T46	T55			
PGA Championship	CUT	T49	CUT		CUT	T18	T30	CUT		

Tournament	1990	1991	1992	1993	1994
Masters Tournament	CUT	T32			
U.S. Open	CUT	T49		T25	T47
PGA Championship		T16	CUT	T31	

Note: Levi never played in The Open Championship.

Did not play

WD = Withdrew
CUT = missed the half-way cut
"T" indicates a tie for a place

=== Summary ===
Tournament	Wins	2nd	3rd	Top-5	Top-10	Top-25	Events	Cuts made
Masters Tournament	0	0	0	0	0	5	9	7
U.S. Open	0	0	0	0	0	2	14	10
The Open Championship	0	0	0	0	0	0	0	0
PGA Championship	0	0	0	0	0	2	10	5
Totals	0	0	0	0	0	9	33	22

- Most consecutive cuts made – 6 (1985 Masters – 1986 PGA)
- Longest streak of top-10s – 0

== Results in The Players Championship ==
Tournament	1978	1979	1980	1981	1982	1983	1984	1985	1986	1987	1988	1989	1990	1991	1992	1993	1994	1995	1996	1997
The Players Championship	T63	T5	WD	T26	WD	T13	T20	CUT	T48	CUT	T8	T50	CUT	CUT	T17	CUT	T27	T43		CUT

Top 10
Did not play

CUT = missed the halfway cut
WD = withdrew
"T" indicates a tie for a place

== U.S. national team appearances ==
Professional

- Four Tours World Championship: 1990
- Ryder Cup: 1991 (winners)
- World Cup: 1991

== See also ==
- Spring 1977 PGA Tour Qualifying School graduates
