= George Burns (golfer) =

American professional golfer (born 1949)

Personal information
- Full name: George Francis Burns III
- Nationality: United States
- Born: July 29, 1949 (age 77) Brooklyn, New York, U.S.
- Height: 6 ft 2 in (1.88 m)
- Weight: 200 lb (91 kg; 14 st)
- Children: Kelly Ann, Eileen Marie

Career
- Sport: Golf
- College: University of Tennessee; University of Maryland
- Turned professional: 1975
- Former tours: PGA Tour; European Tour; Champions Tour; European Seniors Tour
- Professional wins: 9

Number of wins by tour
- PGA Tour: 4
- European Tour: 2
- Other: 3

Best results in major championships
- Masters Tournament: T30: 1975
- PGA Championship: T19: 1977, 1978
- U.S. Open: T2: 1981
- The Open Championship: T5: 1977

George Francis Burns III (born July 29, 1949) is an American professional golfer. Turning pro in 1975, Burns had four PGA Tour wins, 80 top-10 finishes and won several other tournaments at both the amateur and professional levels.

== Early life ==
Burns was born in Brooklyn, New York. He was the eldest child of George Burns Jr, President of Smith Corona Typewriters and Durkee Foods, and Kathleen Marie Scott.

== Amateur career ==
Burns attended the University of Tennessee before transferring his freshman year to the University of Maryland where he played defensive end for one season before quitting football to focus solely on golf.

== Professional career ==
In 1975, Burns turned pro. He won four PGA Tour events during that phase of his career. His first win came with Ben Crenshaw at the 1979 Walt Disney World National Team Championship in Orlando. The biggest win of his career came a year later at the Bing Crosby National Pro-Am. Burns had more than 70 top-10 finishes on the PGA Tour. His best finish in a major was at the 1981 U.S. Open where Burns held a three-shot lead going into the final round before finishing T2. Burns also had a T-5 at the 1977 British Open.

After reaching the age of 50 in 1999, Burns began play on the Senior PGA Tour. His best finish at that level is a T-9 at the 2000 Brickyard Classic.

== Personal life ==
Burns lives in Boynton Beach, Florida.

== Amateur wins ==
- 1972 Metropolitan Amateur, Monroe Invitational, Long Island Amateur
- 1973 Canadian Amateur Championship
- 1974 Azalea Invitational, Porter Cup, North and South Amateur, New York State Amateur

== Professional wins (9) ==
=== PGA Tour wins (4) ===
No.	Date	Tournament	Winning score	Margin of victory	Runner(s)-up
1	Oct 28, 1979	Walt Disney World National Team Championship (with (United States) Ben Crenshaw)	−33 (62-66-62-65=255)	3 strokes	(United States) Peter Jacobsen and (United States) D. A. Weibring, (United States) Jeff Hewes and (United States) Sammy Rachels, (United States) Scott Bess and (Canada) Dan Halldorson
2	Feb 3, 1980	Bing Crosby National Pro-Am	−8 (71-69-71-69=280)	1 stroke	(United States) Dan Pohl
3	Sep 8, 1985	Bank of Boston Classic	−17 (67-66-68-66=267)	6 strokes	(United States) John Mahaffey, (United States) Jodie Mudd, (Australia) Greg Norman, (United States) Leonard Thompson
4	Feb 25, 1987	Shearson Lehman Brothers Andy Williams Open	−22 (63-68-70-65=266)	4 strokes	(United States) J. C. Snead, (United States) Bobby Wadkins

PGA Tour playoff record (0–2)

No.	Year	Tournament	Opponent(s)	Result
1	1984	Bay Hill Classic	(United States) Gary Koch	Lost to birdie on second extra hole
2	1985	Manufacturers Hanover Westchester Classic	(United States) Raymond Floyd, (United States) Roger Maltbie	Maltbie won with birdie on fourth extra hole

=== European Tour wins (2) ===
No.	Date	Tournament	Winning score	Margin of victory	Runner-up
1	Jul 27, 1975	Scandinavian Enterprise Open	−5 (70-70-70-69=279)	Playoff	(Australia) Graham Marsh
2	Sep 14, 1975	Kerrygold International Classic	+6 (78-72-70-74=294)	Playoff	(England) John Fowler

European Tour playoff record (2–0)

No.	Year	Tournament	Opponent	Result
1	1975	Scandinavian Enterprise Open	(Australia) Graham Marsh	Won with par on first extra hole
2	1975	Kerrygold International Classic	(England) John Fowler	Won with par on second extra hole

=== Other wins (3) ===
- 1982 New York State Open, Panama Open
- 1988 Chrysler Team Championship (with Wayne Levi)

== Results in major championships ==
Tournament	1975	1976	1977	1978	1979
Masters Tournament	T30LA				
U.S. Open			T49	T46	T48
The Open Championship	T10	T10	T5	CUT	
PGA Championship		CUT	T19	T19	T28

Tournament	1980	1981	1982	1983	1984	1985	1986	1987	1988	1989	1990
Masters Tournament	CUT		T33	CUT			CUT	CUT			
U.S. Open	T28	T2	T30		T34		CUT		CUT		CUT
The Open Championship	CUT										
PGA Championship	CUT	T70	T42	T55	CUT	CUT	CUT	CUT			

Top 10
Did not play

LA = Low amateur
CUT = missed the half-way cut (3rd round cut in 1978 Open Championship)
"T" indicates a tie for a place

=== Summary ===
Tournament	Wins	2nd	3rd	Top-5	Top-10	Top-25	Events	Cuts made
Masters Tournament	0	0	0	0	0	0	6	2
U.S. Open	0	1	0	1	1	1	10	7
The Open Championship	0	0	0	1	3	3	5	3
PGA Championship	0	0	0	0	0	2	12	6
Totals	0	1	0	2	4	6	33	18

- Most consecutive cuts made – 5 (1981 U.S. Open – 1982 PGA)
- Longest streak of top-10s – 2 (1975 Open Championship – 1976 Open Championship)

== U.S. national team appearances ==
Amateur

- Eisenhower Trophy: 1974 (winners)
- Walker Cup: 1975 (winners)

== See also ==
- Fall 1975 PGA Tour Qualifying School graduates
- 1990 PGA Tour Qualifying School graduates
