= 1979 PGA Tour =

Golf tour season

1979 PGA Tour season
- Duration: January 11, 1979 – October 28, 1979
- Number of official events: 44
- Most wins: (United States) Tom Watson (5)
- Money list: (United States) Tom Watson
- PGA Player of the Year: (United States) Tom Watson
- Rookie of the Year: (United States) John Fought

The 1979 PGA Tour was the 64th season of the PGA Tour, the main professional golf tour in the United States. It was also the 11th season since separating from the PGA of America.

== Schedule ==
The following table lists official events during the 1979 season.

Date	Tournament	Location	Purse (US$)	Winner(s) (Note: The number in parentheses after each winner's name is the number of PGA Tour events they had won up to and including that tournament. This information is only shown for PGA Tour members.)	Notes
Jan 14	Bob Hope Desert Classic	California	300,000	(United States) John Mahaffey (4)	Pro-Am
Jan 22	Phoenix Open	Arizona	250,000	(United States) Ben Crenshaw (6)	
Jan 28	Andy Williams-San Diego Open Invitational	California	250,000	(United States) Fuzzy Zoeller (1)	
Feb 4	Bing Crosby National Pro-Am	California	300,000	(United States) Lon Hinkle (2)	Pro-Am
Feb 11	Hawaiian Open	Hawaii	300,000	(United States) Hubert Green (15)	
Feb 18	Joe Garagiola-Tucson Open	Arizona	250,000	(United States) Bruce Lietzke (4)	
Feb 25	Glen Campbell-Los Angeles Open	California	250,000	(United States) Lanny Wadkins (6)	
Mar 4	Bay Hill Citrus Classic	Florida	250,000	(United States) Bob Byman (1)	
Mar 11	Jackie Gleason-Inverrary Classic	Florida	300,000	(United States) Larry Nelson (1)	
Mar 18	Doral-Eastern Open	Florida	250,000	(United States) Mark McCumber (1)	
Mar 25	Tournament Players Championship	Florida	440,000	(United States) Lanny Wadkins (7)	Special event
Apr 1	Sea Pines Heritage Classic	South Carolina	300,000	(United States) Tom Watson (14)	Invitational
Apr 8	Greater Greensboro Open	North Carolina	250,000	(United States) Raymond Floyd (11)	
Apr 15	Masters Tournament	Georgia	299,625	(United States) Fuzzy Zoeller (2)	Major championship
Apr 15	Magnolia Classic	Mississippi	50,000	(United States) Bobby Walzel (n/a)	Second Tour (Note: Official money; unofficial win.)
Apr 22	MONY Tournament of Champions	California	300,000	(United States) Tom Watson (15)	Winners-only event
Apr 22	Tallahassee Open	Florida	100,000	(United States) Chi-Chi Rodríguez (8)	Alternate event
Apr 29	First NBC New Orleans Open	Louisiana	250,000	(United States) Hubert Green (16)	
May 6	Houston Open	Texas	300,000	(United States) Wayne Levi (2)	
May 13	Byron Nelson Golf Classic	Texas	300,000	(United States) Tom Watson (16)	
May 20	Colonial National Invitation	Texas	300,000	(United States) Al Geiberger (11)	Invitational
May 27	Memorial Tournament	Ohio	300,000	(United States) Tom Watson (17)	Invitational
Jun 3	Kemper Open	North Carolina	350,000	(United States) Jerry McGee (3)	
Jun 10	Atlanta Classic	Georgia	300,000	(United States) Andy Bean (5)	
Jun 17	U.S. Open	Ohio	325,000	(United States) Hale Irwin (11)	Major championship
Jun 24	Canadian Open	Canada	350,000	(United States) Lee Trevino (24)	
Jul 1	Danny Thomas Memphis Classic	Tennessee	300,000	(United States) Gil Morgan (4)	
Jul 8	Western Open	Illinois	300,000	(United States) Larry Nelson (2)	
Jul 15	Greater Milwaukee Open	Wisconsin	200,000	(United States) Calvin Peete (1)	
Jul 21	The Open Championship	England	£155,000	(Spain) Seve Ballesteros (2)	Major championship (Note: Unofficial money event at the time, but retrospectively counted as an official win.)
Jul 22	Ed McMahon-Jaycees Quad Cities Open	Illinois	200,000	(United States) D. A. Weibring (1)	Alternate event
Jul 29	IVB-Philadelphia Golf Classic	Pennsylvania	250,000	(United States) Lou Graham (4)	
Aug 5	PGA Championship	Michigan	350,000	(Australia) David Graham (4)	Major championship
Aug 12	Sammy Davis Jr.-Greater Hartford Open	Connecticut	300,000	(United States) Jerry McGee (4)	
Aug 19	Manufacturers Hanover Westchester Classic	New York	400,000	(United States) Jack Renner (1)	
Aug 26	Colgate Hall of Fame Classic	North Carolina	250,000	(United States) Tom Watson (18)	
Sep 2	B.C. Open	New York	275,000	(United States) Howard Twitty (1)	
Sep 9	American Optical Classic	Massachusetts	250,000	(United States) Lou Graham (5)	
Sep 16	Buick-Goodwrench Open	Michigan	150,000	(United States) John Fought (1)	
Sep 23	Anheuser-Busch Golf Classic	California	300,000	(United States) John Fought (2)	
Sep 30	World Series of Golf	Ohio	400,000	(United States) Lon Hinkle (3)	Limited-field event
Oct 7	San Antonio Texas Open	Texas	250,000	(United States) Lou Graham (6)	
Oct 14	Southern Open	Georgia	200,000	(United States) Ed Fiori (1)	
Oct 21	Pensacola Open	Florida	200,000	(United States) Curtis Strange (1)	
Oct 28	Walt Disney World National Team Championship	Florida	250,000	(United States) George Burns (1) and (United States) Ben Crenshaw (7)	Team event

=== Unofficial events ===
The following events were sanctioned by the PGA Tour, but did not carry official money, nor were wins official.

Date	Tournament	Location	Purse ($)	Winner(s)	Notes
Sep 16	Ryder Cup	West Virginia	n/a	Team USA	Team event
Nov 11	World Cup	Greece	n/a	(United States) Hale Irwin and (United States) John Mahaffey	Team event
Nov 11	World Cup Individual Trophy	Greece	n/a	(United States) Hale Irwin	

== Money list ==
The money list was based on prize money won during the season, calculated in U.S. dollars.

Position	Player	Prize money ($)
1	(United States) Tom Watson	462,636
2	(United States) Larry Nelson	281,022
3	(United States) Lon Hinkle	247,693
4	(United States) Lee Trevino	238,732
5	(United States) Ben Crenshaw	236,770
6	(United States) Bill Rogers	230,500
7	(United States) Andy Bean	208,253
8	(United States) Bruce Lietzke	198,439
9	(United States) Fuzzy Zoeller	196,951
10	(United States) Lanny Wadkins	195,710

== Awards ==
Award	Winner	Ref.
PGA Player of the Year	(United States) Tom Watson	
Rookie of the Year	(United States) John Fought	
Scoring leader (Vardon Trophy)	(United States) Tom Watson	
