= Jack Renner (golfer) =

American professional golfer (born 1956)

Personal information
- Nationality: United States
- Born: July 6, 1956 (age 70) Palm Springs, California, U.S.
- Height: 6 ft 0 in (1.83 m)
- Weight: 150 lb (68 kg; 11 st)

Career
- Sport: Golf
- College: College of the Desert
- Turned professional: 1976
- Former tours: PGA Tour; Champions Tour
- Professional wins: 4

Number of wins by tour
- PGA Tour: 3
- Other: 1

Best results in major championships
- Masters Tournament: T11: 1984
- PGA Championship: T12: 1979
- U.S. Open: T9: 1985
- The Open Championship: DNP

Jack Renner (born July 6, 1956) is an American professional golfer who played on the PGA Tour from 1977–1988 and on the Champions Tour from 2006–2007.

== Early life and amateur career ==
Renner was born in Palm Springs, California. He has a sister, Jane, and a brother, Jim. All three siblings won Junior World Golf Championships in their youth. In addition, his sister eventually turned pro and played on the LPGA Tour.

While in high school, Renner, at the age of 17, won the U.S. Junior Amateur. He later attended the College of the Desert in Palm Desert, California.

== Professional career ==
In 1976, Renner turned pro. He joined the PGA Tour after graduating from Spring 1977 PGA Tour Qualifying School.

Renner had three PGA Tour event wins during his career. His first win was at the 1979 Manufacturers Hanover Westchester Classic. In 1981 he earned his second Tour victory at the Pleasant Valley Jimmy Fund Classic. His last win came at the 1984 Hawaiian Open. He had 53 top-10 finishes including over a dozen 2nd or 3rd-place finishes in his PGA Tour career. His best finish in a major was T9 at the 1985 U.S. Open.

After his PGA Tour days were over, Renner played some on the Nationwide Tour. His best finish in that venue is a T-22 at the 1993 NIKE Utah Classic. He turned 50 in July 2006 and made his debut on the Champions Tour at the U.S. Senior Open.

Renner was known for his outstanding short game.

== Personal life ==
Renner lives in San Diego, California.

== Amateur wins ==
- 1968 Junior World Golf Championships (Boys 11-12)
- 1972 Junior World Golf Championships (Boys 15-17)
- 1973 U.S. Junior Amateur

== Professional wins (4) ==
=== PGA Tour wins (3) ===
No.	Date	Tournament	Winning score	Margin of victory	Runner(s)-up
1	Aug 19, 1979	Manufacturers Hanover Westchester Classic	−7 (69-71-70-67=277)	1 stroke	(Australia) David Graham, (United States) Howard Twitty
2	Sep 13, 1981	Pleasant Valley Jimmy Fund Classic	−11 (68-68-68-69=273)	2 strokes	(United States) Scott Simpson
3	Feb 12, 1984	Hawaiian Open	−17 (70-66-68-67=271)	Playoff	(United States) Wayne Levi

PGA Tour playoff record (1–0)

No.	Year	Tournament	Opponent	Result
1	1984	Hawaiian Open	(United States) Wayne Levi	Won with par on second extra hole

=== Other wins (1) ===
- 1980 Cacharel World Under-25 Championship

== Results in major championships ==
Tournament	1978	1979	1980	1981	1982	1983	1984	1985	1986	1987
Masters Tournament			T14	T31	T20	T16	T11	T47	CUT	
U.S. Open		T41	CUT	T17	T30		T43	T9	WD	T58
PGA Championship	CUT	T12	CUT	T49	CUT	T55	T48	CUT		

Note: Renner never played in The Open Championship.

Top 10
Did not play

WD = withdrew
CUT = missed the half-way cut
"T" = tied

== See also ==
- Spring 1977 PGA Tour Qualifying School graduates
