= Sammy Rachels =

American professional golfer (born 1950)

Personal information
- Full name: Sammy Tindol Rachels III
- Nationality: United States
- Born: September 23, 1950 (age 76) DeFuniak Springs, Florida, U.S.

Career
- Sport: Golf
- College: Columbus College
- Turned professional: 1972
- Former tours: PGA Tour; Champions Tour
- Professional wins: 4

Number of wins by tour
- PGA Tour Champions: 3
- Other: 1

Best results in major championships
- Masters Tournament: DNP
- PGA Championship: T45: 1990
- U.S. Open: T6: 1981
- The Open Championship: DNP

Sammy Tindol Rachels III (born September 23, 1950) is an American professional golfer who has played on the PGA Tour and the Nationwide Tour, but found his greatest level of success on the Champions Tour.

== Early life ==
Rachels was born in DeFuniak Springs, Florida. He has lived in the town his entire life. He attended Columbus College and won the 1971 NAIA Championship.

== Professional career ==
In 1972, Rachels turned professional. Rachels played on the PGA Tour from 1975 to 1985, and had 11 top-10 finishes in 123 career events. Although he never won, he recorded runner-up finishes at the Danny Thomas Memphis Classic and Bank of Boston Classic in 1983. He also had a runner-up finish in the unofficial Magnolia State Classic that year. His best finish in a major championship was T6 at the 1981 U.S. Open. Four back operations forced him to leave the Tour and take a club pro job near his home in the Florida Panhandle.

Rachels joined the Nationwide Tour in his forties to prepare for the Champions Tour, which he joined after reaching the age of 50 in September 2000. He won three events in his first two years on the Champions Tour.

== Professional wins (4) ==
=== Regular career wins (1) ===
- 1994 PGA Club Professional Championship

=== Senior PGA Tour wins (3) ===
No.	Date	Tournament	Winning score	Margin of victory	Runner(s)-up
1	Jun 3, 2001	BellSouth Senior Classic	−17 ( 66-70-63=199)	4 strokes	(United States) Hale Irwin
2	Oct 14, 2001	The Transamerica	−14 (70-63-69=202)	1 stroke	(United States) Raymond Floyd, (United States) Doug Tewell
3	May 5, 2002	Bruno's Memorial Classic	−15 (70-64-67=201)	Playoff	(United States) Dana Quigley

Senior PGA Tour playoff record (1–0)

No.	Year	Tournament	Opponent	Result
1	2002	Bruno's Memorial Classic	(United States) Dana Quigley	Won with birdie on second extra hole

== Results in major championships ==
Tournament	1981	1982	1983	1984	1985	1986	1987	1988	1989	1990	1991	1992	1993
U.S. Open	T6												
PGA Championship									CUT	T45			CUT

Note: Rachels never played in the Masters Tournament or The Open Championship.

Top 10
Did not play

CUT = missed the half-way cut
"T" indicates a tie for a place

== U.S. national team appearances ==
- PGA Cup: 1990 (winners), 1996 (tie)

== See also ==
- Spring 1975 PGA Tour Qualifying School graduates
- 1982 PGA Tour Qualifying School graduates
