= Lon Hinkle =

American professional golfer (born 1949)

Personal information
- Full name: Lon Currey Hinkle
- Nationality: United States
- Born: July 17, 1949 (age 77) Flint, Michigan, U.S.

Career
- Sport: Golf
- College: San Diego State University
- Turned professional: 1972
- Former tours: PGA Tour; Champions Tour
- Professional wins: 5

Number of wins by tour
- PGA Tour: 3
- Korn Ferry Tour: 1
- Other: 1

Best results in major championships
- Masters Tournament: T28: 1981
- PGA Championship: T3: 1980
- U.S. Open: T3: 1980
- The Open Championship: T19: 1975

Lon Currey Hinkle (born July 17, 1949) is an American professional golfer. He played on the PGA Tour and the Champions Tour.

== Early life and amateur career ==
In 1949, Hinkle was born in Flint, Michigan. He attended Santana High School in Santee, California and graduated in 1967.

Hinkle attended nearby San Diego State University for college. He was a member of the golf team.

== Professional career ==
In 1972, Hinkle turned professional. He joined the PGA Tour after his success at 1972 PGA Tour Qualifying School.

In the late 1970s, Hinkle won three tournaments on the PGA Tour. In 1979, he earned $247,693, finished 3rd on the money list, and won two tour events, including the World Series of Golf. That year in the first round of the U.S. Open at Inverness Club he took a shortcut, cutting the dogleg on the par-5 8th hole by hitting onto the 17th fairway. Overnight, USGA officials planted a tree (known ever afterwards as The Hinkle Tree) to block the shortcut. His best finish in a major was a T-3 at both the U.S. Open and the PGA Championship in 1980. During his career on the PGA Tour, he had more than 50 top-10 finishes. He also played on the European Tour occasionally. Though he never won he finished runner-up at the 1975 German Open and 1980 European Open.

In 1981, Hinkle won the World Long Drive Championship.

After turning 50 in 1999, Hinkle joined the Champions Tour. His best finish at that level is a T-12 in the 2000 Audi Senior Classic.

== Personal life ==
Hinkle lives in Bigfork, Montana in the northwest corner of the state.

== Professional wins (5) ==
=== PGA Tour wins (3) ===
No.	Date	Tournament	Winning score	Margin of victory	Runners-up
1	Apr 30, 1978	First NBC New Orleans Open	−17 (74-67-64-66=271)	1 stroke	(United States) Gibby Gilbert, (United States) Fuzzy Zoeller
2	Feb 4, 1979	Bing Crosby National Pro-Am	−4 (70-68-69-77=284)	Playoff	(United States) Andy Bean, (United States) Mark Hayes
3	Sep 30, 1979	World Series of Golf	−8 (67-67-71-67=272)	1 stroke	(United States) Larry Nelson, (United States) Bill Rogers, (United States) Lee Trevino

PGA Tour playoff record (1–2)

No.	Year	Tournament	Opponent(s)	Result
1	1977	Tallahassee Open	(United States) Ed Sneed	Lost to birdie on first extra hole
2	1979	Bing Crosby National Pro-Am	(United States) Andy Bean, (United States) Mark Hayes	Won with birdie on third extra hole Bean eliminated by par on second hole
3	1986	Walt Disney World/Oldsmobile Classic	(United States) Raymond Floyd, (United States) Mike Sullivan	Floyd won with par on first extra hole

=== Ben Hogan Tour wins (1) ===
No.	Date	Tournament	Winning score	Margin of victory	Runners-up
1	Jun 2, 1991	Ben Hogan Quicksilver Open	−6 (70-68-72=210)	2 strokes	(United States) Andy Morse, (United States) Rick Pearson, (United States) Joey Rassett

=== Other wins (1) ===
- 1978 JCPenney Mixed Team Classic (with Pat Bradley)

== Results in major championships ==
Tournament	1975	1976	1977	1978	1979	1980	1981	1982	1983	1984	1985	1986	1987
Masters Tournament					CUT	WD	T28	CUT					
U.S. Open		T38		CUT	T53	T3	T6	T45					
The Open Championship	T19				CUT	CUT							
PGA Championship			T31	63	T65	T3	T39	T9	T47	70	T51		73

Top 10
Did not play

WD = withdrew
CUT = missed the half-way cut
"T" indicates a tie for a place

=== Summary ===
Tournament	Wins	2nd	3rd	Top-5	Top-10	Top-25	Events	Cuts made
Masters Tournament	0	0	0	0	0	0	4	1
U.S. Open	0	0	1	1	2	2	6	5
The Open Championship	0	0	0	0	0	1	3	1
PGA Championship	0	0	1	1	2	2	10	10
Totals	0	0	2	2	4	5	23	17

- Most consecutive cuts made – 6 (1982 U.S. Open – 1987 PGA)
- Longest streak of top-10s – 1 (four times)

== Results in The Players Championship ==
Tournament	1977	1978	1979	1980	1981	1982	1983	1984	1985	1986	1987	1988	1989	1990
The Players Championship	CUT	3	CUT	T39	CUT		T56	CUT	T7	CUT	CUT	CUT	CUT	CUT

Top 10
Did not play

CUT = missed the halfway cut
"T" indicates a tie for a place

== See also ==
- 1972 PGA Tour Qualifying School graduates
- 1991 PGA Tour Qualifying School graduates
