= 1988 Masters Tournament =

- Front cover of the 1988 Masters Guide

Tournament information
- Dates: April 7–10, 1988
- Location: Augusta, Georgia; 33.503°N 82.020°W
- Course: Augusta National Golf Club
- Organized by: Augusta National Golf Club
- Tour: PGA Tour

Statistics
- Par: 72
- Length: 6,925 yards (6,332 m)
- Field: 90 players, 46 after cut
- Cut: 151 (+7)
- Prize fund: $1.0 million
- Winner's share: $183,800

Champion
- (Scotland) Sandy Lyle
- 281 (−7)
- Location in the United States Location in Georgia

The 1988 Masters Tournament was the 52nd Masters Tournament, held April 7–10 at Augusta National Golf Club in Augusta, Georgia. Sandy Lyle won his second major title with a birdie on the 72nd hole to win by one stroke over runner-up Mark Calcavecchia.

Lyle led after 36 and 54 holes, but relinquished the lead on the final nine; he carded a double-bogey on the par-3 12th after his tee shot hit the bank and rolled back into Rae's Creek. Having failed to make birdie on either of the two par-5s on the back nine, he remained one stroke behind Calcavecchia at the par-3 16th. Lyle's tee shot found the green and left him with a 15-foot (4.6 m) putt for birdie, which he holed.

Tied for the lead on the 18th tee, Lyle's 1-iron tee shot found the fairway bunker. His 7-iron approach landed past the flag and up the slope of the tier running across the green, before gradually rolling back to finish around 10 feet (3 m) from the hole. After holing the birdie putt, Lyle danced up the green to claim his only green jacket.

From Scotland, Lyle was the first winner of the Masters from the United Kingdom, which had four consecutive with Nick Faldo's playoff wins in 1989 and 1990 and Ian Woosnam's one-stroke victory in 1991.

== Field ==
1. Masters champions

Tommy Aaron, George Archer, Seve Ballesteros (3,8,9), Gay Brewer, Billy Casper, Charles Coody, Ben Crenshaw (8,9,10,11,12), Raymond Floyd (2), Doug Ford, Bernhard Langer (8,9,12), Larry Mize (9,12,13), Jack Nicklaus (8), Arnold Palmer, Gary Player, Craig Stadler (8), Art Wall Jr., Tom Watson (3,8,9,11,12), Fuzzy Zoeller (2)

- Jack Burke Jr., Bob Goalby, Claude Harmon, Ben Hogan, Herman Keiser, Cary Middlecoff, Byron Nelson, Henry Picard, Gene Sarazen, and Sam Snead did not play.

2. U.S. Open champions (last five years)

Larry Nelson (4,11,12,13), Andy North, Scott Simpson (11,12,13)

3. The Open champions (last five years)

Nick Faldo (11), Sandy Lyle (8,11), Greg Norman (8,12)

4. PGA champions (last five years)

Hubert Green, Hal Sutton (12,13), Lee Trevino, Bob Tway

5. 1987 U.S. Amateur semi-finalists

Stephen Ford (a), Scott Gump (a), Billy Mayfair (6,7,a), Eric Rebmann (a)

6. Previous two U.S. Amateur and British Amateur champions

Buddy Alexander (7,a), David Curry (a), Paul Mayo (a)

7. Members of the 1987 U.S. Walker Cup team

Bob Lewis (a), Bill Loeffler (a), Len Mattiace (a), Brian Montgomery (a), Jay Sigel (a)

- Billy Andrade, Chris Kite, Jim Sorenson forfeited their exemptions by turning professional.

8. Top 24 players and ties from the 1987 Masters Tournament

Paul Azinger (11,12), Chip Beck (11,12), Mark Calcavecchia (12,13), Chen Tze-chung, John Cook (11,12), Jay Haas (11), Tom Kite (11,12,13), Gary Koch, Roger Maltbie, Mark McCumber (10,11,12), Jodie Mudd, Mark O'Meara (12), Nick Price (12), Curtis Strange (9,11,12,13), Bobby Wadkins (9,10,12), Lanny Wadkins (10,11,12,13), D. A. Weibring (10,11,12)

9. Top 16 players and ties from the 1987 U.S. Open

Isao Aoki, Lennie Clements, Bob Eastwood, Tsuneyuki Nakajima, Mac O'Grady, Dan Pohl (12,13), Tim Simpson, Jim Thorpe

10. Top eight players and ties from 1987 PGA Championship

Scott Hoch (12), Don Pooley (11,12)

11. Winners of PGA Tour events since the previous Masters

Dave Barr, Ken Brown, Keith Clearwater, Fred Couples (12), Gary Hallberg, Steve Jones, Kenny Knox, Davis Love III, Steve Pate (12), Sam Randolph, Mike Reid (12), Joey Sindelar, J. C. Snead, Doug Tewell, Robert Wrenn

- John Inman, the winner of the Provident Classic was not invited.

12. Top 30 players from the 1987 PGA Tour money list

David Frost, Corey Pavin, Jeff Sluman, Payne Stewart (13)

13. Members of the U.S. 1987 Ryder Cup team

Andy Bean

14. Special foreign invitation

Rodger Davis, Mark McNulty, Ian Woosnam

== Round summaries ==
=== First round ===
Thursday, April 7, 1988

Place	Player	Score	To par
T1	(United States) Larry Nelson	69	−3
T1	(United States) Robert Wrenn	69	−3
T3	(United States) Mark Calcavecchia	71	−1
T3	(West Germany) Bernhard Langer	71	−1
T3	(Scotland) Sandy Lyle	71	−1
T3	(United States) Don Pooley	71	−1
T7	(United States) Ben Crenshaw	72	E
T7	(United States) Gary Koch	72	E
T7	(United States) Tom Watson	72	E
T10	(Spain) Seve Ballesteros	73	+1
T10	(United States) Andy Bean	73	+1
T10	(United States) Chip Beck	73	+1
T10	(Scotland) Ken Brown	73	+1
T10	(South Africa) David Frost	73	+1
T10	(United States) Gary Hallberg	73	+1
T10	(United States) Tom Kite	73	+1
T10	(United States) Davis Love III	73	+1

=== Second round ===
Friday, April 8, 1988

Place	Player	Score	To par
1	(Scotland) Sandy Lyle	71-67=138	−6
2	(United States) Mark Calcavecchia	71-69=140	−4
T3	(United States) Gary Hallberg	73-69=142	−2
T3	(United States) Fuzzy Zoeller	76-66=142	−2
T5	(United States) Chip Beck	73-70=143	−1
T5	(United States) Fred Couples	75-68=143	−1
T5	(West Germany) Bernhard Langer	71-72=143	−1
T5	(United States) Don Pooley	71-72=143	−1
T5	(United States) Tom Watson	72-71=143	−1
T10	(United States) Hubert Green	74-70=144	E
T10	(United States) Robert Wrenn	69-75=144	E

=== Third round ===
Saturday, April 9, 1988

Place	Player	Score	To par
1	(Scotland) Sandy Lyle	71-67-72=210	−6
T2	(United States) Mark Calcavecchia	71-69-72=212	−4
T2	(United States) Ben Crenshaw	72-73-67=212	−4
T4	(United States) Fred Couples	75-68-71=214	−2
T4	(West Germany) Bernhard Langer	71-72-71=214	−2
T4	(United States) Fuzzy Zoeller	76-66-72=214	−2
T7	(Spain) Seve Ballesteros	73-72-70=215	−1
T7	(United States) Don Pooley	71-72-72=215	−1
T7	(United States) Craig Stadler	76-69-70=215	−1
T10	(United States) Doug Tewell	75-73-68=216	E
T10	(United States) Tom Watson	72-71-73=216	E

=== Final round ===
Sunday, April 10, 1988

==== Final leaderboard ====
Champion
Silver Cup winner (low amateur)
(a) = amateur
(c) = past champion

Top 10
Place	Player	Score	To par	Money (US$)
1	(Scotland) Sandy Lyle	71-67-72-71=281	−7	183,800
2	(United States) Mark Calcavecchia	71-69-72-70=282	−6	110,200
3	(United States) Craig Stadler (c)	76-69-70-68=283	−5	69,400
4	(United States) Ben Crenshaw (c)	72-73-67-72=284	−4	48,900
T5	(United States) Fred Couples	75-68-71-71=285	−3	36,500
T5	(Australia) Greg Norman	77-73-71-64=285	−3	36,500
T5	(United States) Don Pooley	71-72-72-70=285	−3	36,500
8	(South Africa) David Frost	73-74-71-68=286	−2	31,000
T9	(West Germany) Bernhard Langer (c)	71-72-71-73=287	−1	28,000
T9	(United States) Tom Watson (c)	72-71-73-71=287	−1	28,000

Leaderboard below the top 10
Place	Player	Score	To par	Money ($)
T11	(Spain) Seve Ballesteros (c)	73-72-70-73=288	E	23,000
T11	(United States) Raymond Floyd (c)	80-69-68-71=288	E	23,000
T11	(United States) Lanny Wadkins	74-75-69-70=288	E	23,000
T14	(Zimbabwe) Nick Price	75-76-72-66=289	+1	18,500
T14	(United States) Doug Tewell	75-73-68-73=289	+1	18,500
T16	(Zimbabwe) Mark McNulty	74-71-73-72=290	+2	16,000
T16	(United States) Dan Pohl	78-70-69-73=290	+2	16,000
T16	(United States) Fuzzy Zoeller (c)	76-66-72-76=290	+2	16,000
T19	(Taiwan) Chen Tze-chung	76-73-72-70=291	+3	13,500
T19	(United States) Hubert Green	74-70-75-72=291	+3	13,500
T21	(United States) Chip Beck	73-70-76-73=292	+4	11,200
T21	(United States) Jack Nicklaus (c)	75-73-72-72=292	+4	11,200
T21	(United States) Curtis Strange	76-70-72-74=292	+4	11,200
24	(United States) Mark McCumber	79-71-72-71=293	+5	9,600
T25	(Japan) Isao Aoki	74-74-73-73=294	+6	7,975
T25	(United States) Gary Koch	72-73-74-75=294	+6	7,975
T25	(United States) Payne Stewart	75-76-71-72=294	+6	7,975
T25	(United States) Robert Wrenn	69-75-76-74=294	+6	7,975
29	(Australia) Rodger Davis	77-72-71-75=295	+7	7,100
T30	(England) Nick Faldo	75-74-75-72=296	+8	6,500
T30	(United States) Steve Jones	74-74-75-73=296	+8	6,500
T30	(United States) Mac O'Grady	74-73-76-73=296	+8	6,500
T33	(Japan) Tsuneyuki Nakajima	74-72-77-74=297	+9	5,667
T33	(United States) Larry Nelson	69-78-75-75=297	+9	5,667
T33	(United States) Bob Tway	74-73-74-76=297	+9	5,667
T36	(Scotland) Ken Brown	73-78-69-78=298	+10	4,900
T36	(United States) Andy North	74-74-75-75=298	+10	4,900
T36	(United States) Steve Pate	75-76-75-72=298	+10	4,900
T39	(United States) Mark O'Meara	74-76-74-76=300	+12	4,400
T39	(United States) Jay Sigel (a)	77-72-73-78=300	+12	0
T39	(United States) Joey Sindelar	79-70-74-77=300	+12	4,400
T42	(United States) Gary Hallberg	73-69-80-79=301	+13	4,000
T42	(United States) Corey Pavin	76-75-75-75=301	+13	4,000
44	(United States) Tom Kite	73-76-77-76=302	+14	3,700
T45	(United States) Larry Mize (c)	78-71-76-79=304	+16	3,400
T45	(United States) Jeff Sluman	80-71-78-75=304	+16	3,400
CUT	(Canada) Dave Barr	77-75=152	+8	
CUT	(United States) Andy Bean	73-79=152	+8	
CUT	(United States) Jay Haas	81-71=152	+8	
CUT	(United States) Scott Hoch	79-73=152	+8	
CUT	(United States) Kenny Knox	75-77=152	+8	
CUT	(United States) Davis Love III	73-79=152	+8	
CUT	(United States) Sam Randolph	78-74=152	+8	
CUT	(United States) John Cook	77-76=153	+9	
CUT	(United States) Bob Eastwood	77-76=153	+9	
CUT	(South Africa) Gary Player (c)	78-75=153	+9	
CUT	(United States) Charles Coody (c)	78-76=154	+10	
CUT	(England) David Curry (a)	74-80=154	+10	
CUT	(United States) Roger Maltbie	76-78=154	+10	
CUT	(United States) Mike Reid	78-76=154	+10	
CUT	(United States) Tim Simpson	80-74=154	+10	
CUT	(United States) George Archer (c)	80-75=155	+11	
CUT	(United States) Paul Azinger	75-80=155	+11	
CUT	(United States) Keith Clearwater	82-73=155	+11	
CUT	(United States) Billy Mayfair (a)	80-75=155	+11	
CUT	(United States) Scott Simpson	79-76=155	+11	
CUT	(United States) Bobby Wadkins	79-76=155	+11	
CUT	(Wales) Ian Woosnam	81-74=155	+11	
CUT	(United States) Lennie Clements	75-81=156	+12	
CUT	(United States) Bill Loeffler (a)	77-79=156	+12	
CUT	(United States) Len Mattiace (a)	79-77=156	+12	
CUT	(United States) Eric Rebmann (a)	77-79=156	+12	
CUT	(United States) D. A. Weibring	79-77=156	+12	
CUT	(United States) Arnold Palmer (c)	80-77=157	+13	
CUT	(United States) Hal Sutton	80-77=157	+13	
CUT	(United States) Buddy Alexander (a)	78-80=158	+14	
CUT	(United States) J. C. Snead	79-79=158	+14	
CUT	(United States) Gay Brewer (c)	78-81=159	+15	
CUT	(United States) Brian Montgomery (a)	78-81=159	+15	
CUT	(United States) Scott Gump (a)	83-77=160	+16	
CUT	(Wales) Paul Mayo (a)	81-80=161	+17	
CUT	(United States) Doug Ford (c)	80-82=162	+18	
CUT	(United States) Jodie Mudd	84-78=162	+18	
CUT	(United States) Stephen Ford (a)	83-80=163	+19	
CUT	(United States) Lee Trevino	81-83=164	+20	
CUT	(United States) Art Wall Jr. (c)	86-79=165	+21	
CUT	(United States) Tommy Aaron (c)	83-83=166	+22	
CUT	(United States) Billy Casper (c)	80-86=166	+22	
CUT	(United States) Bob Lewis (a)	87-83=170	+26	
WD	(United States) Jim Thorpe			

==== Scorecard ====
Hole	1	2	3	4	5	6	7	8	9	10	11	12	13	14	15	16	17	18
Par	4	5	4	3	4	3	4	5	4	4	4	3	5	4	5	3	4	4
(Scotland) Lyle	−6	−7	−7	−8	−8	−7	−7	−7	−8	−8	−7	−5	−5	−5	−5	−6	−6	−7
(United States) Calcavecchia	−4	−5	−5	−4	−4	−3	−2	−3	−4	−4	−5	−5	−6	−6	−6	−6	−6	−6
(United States) Stadler	−1	−2	−2	−2	−2	−2	−3	−5	−5	−5	−5	−5	−4	−5	−6	−5	−5	−5
(United States) Crenshaw	−3	−4	−5	−5	−5	−4	−3	−3	−3	−3	−3	−3	−3	−3	−4	−4	−4	−4
(United States) Couples	−2	−3	−3	−2	−2	−2	−2	−3	−3	−3	−3	−2	−2	−3	−3	−3	−4	−3
(Australia) Norman	+5	+4	+3	+3	+3	+2	+1	E	−1	−1	−1	−1	−2	−2	−3	−3	−3	−3
(United States) Pooley	−2	−3	−4	−3	−3	−2	−2	−3	−3	−4	−4	−4	−4	−3	−2	−3	−3	−3
(South Africa) Frost	+3	+2	+2	+2	+1	E	E	E	E	E	E	+1	E	−1	−1	−1	−2	−2
(West Germany) Langer	−2	−3	−3	−2	−2	−2	−2	−2	−2	−3	−3	−3	−4	−3	−2	−1	−1	−1
(United States) Watson	E	E	E	+1	+1	+1	+1	+1	+1	+1	+1	E	E	+1	E	+1	E	−1
(Spain) Ballesteros	E	E	E	E	−1	−1	−1	E	−1	−1	−1	−1	E	E	−1	−1	−1	E

Cumulative tournament scores, relative to par

Eagle	Birdie	Bogey	Double bogey
