= 1981 Masters Tournament =

- Front cover of the 1981 Masters Guide

Tournament information
- Dates: April 9–12, 1981
- Location: Augusta, Georgia; 33.503°N 82.020°W
- Course: Augusta National Golf Club
- Organized by: Augusta National Golf Club
- Tour: PGA Tour

Statistics
- Par: 72
- Length: 6,905 yards (6,314 m)
- Field: 82 players, 48 after cut
- Cut: 148 (+4)
- Prize fund: $362,587
- Winner's share: $60,000

Champion
- (United States) Tom Watson
- 280 (−8)
- Location in the United States Location in Georgia

The 1981 Masters Tournament was the 45th Masters Tournament, held April 9–12 at Augusta National Golf Club in Augusta, Georgia. Tom Watson won his second green jacket and fifth major title by two strokes over Jack Nicklaus and Johnny Miller.

Five-time champion Nicklaus shot a bogey-free 65 on Friday and led by four strokes after 36 holes, but a 75 on Saturday put him a stroke behind Watson entering the final round. It was the fourth runner-up finish for Nicklaus at the Masters and the third for Miller. Nicklaus won his sixth Masters five years later in 1986 at age 46.

Defending champion Seve Ballesteros shot 154 (+10) and missed the cut by six strokes; he also missed the cut as defending champion in 1984. Lee Trevino, needing a green jacket to complete the career grand slam, also shot 154 with an ailing back. His best finishes at Augusta were tenth place ties in 1975 and 1985.

Greg Norman, age 26, appeared in his first Masters and was fourth, the first of his eight top-five finishes at Augusta. He was runner-up three times, in 1986, 1987, and 1996.

This was the first Masters with bentgrass greens, which were formerly Bermuda and ryegrass.

== Field ==
1. Masters champions

Tommy Aaron, George Archer, Seve Ballesteros (3,8), Gay Brewer, Billy Casper, Charles Coody, Raymond Floyd (8,11), Doug Ford, Bob Goalby, Jack Nicklaus (2,3,4,9,10), Arnold Palmer (8), Gary Player (8), Sam Snead, Art Wall Jr., Tom Watson (3,8,9,11), Fuzzy Zoeller (8,12)

- Jack Burke Jr., Jimmy Demaret, Ralph Guldahl, Claude Harmon, Ben Hogan, Herman Keiser, Cary Middlecoff, Byron Nelson, Henry Picard, and Gene Sarazen did not play.

The following categories only apply to Americans

2. U.S. Open champions (last five years)

Hubert Green (8,12), Hale Irwin (9,11,12), Andy North (8,9), Jerry Pate (8)

3. The Open champions (last five years)

Johnny Miller (11)

4. PGA champions (last five years)

John Mahaffey (11,12), Dave Stockton, Lanny Wadkins (12)

5. 1980 U.S. Amateur semi-finalists

Jim Holtgrieve (7,a), Bob Lewis (a), Hal Sutton (6,7,a), Dick von Tacky (a)

6. Previous two U.S. Amateur and Amateur champions

Jay Sigel (7,a)

- Mark O'Meara forfeited his exemption by turning professional.

7. Members of the 1980 U.S. Eisenhower Trophy team

Bob Tway (a)

8. Top 24 players and ties from the 1980 Masters Tournament

Andy Bean (10,11,12), Jim Colbert, Ben Crenshaw (11), Ed Fiori, Gibby Gilbert, Jay Haas, Tom Kite (11,12), Billy Kratzert (11), Gil Morgan (9,10,12), Larry Nelson (11,12), Calvin Peete, Jack Renner, Jim Simons, J. C. Snead

9. Top 16 players and ties from the 1980 U.S. Open

Keith Fergus, Joe Hager, Mark Hayes (12), Lon Hinkle (10), Joe Inman, Pat McGowan, Mike Morley, Mike Reid, Bill Rogers (10,11), Ed Sneed, Craig Stadler, Curtis Strange (10,11), Lee Trevino (10,11,12), Bobby Wadkins

10. Top eight players and ties from 1980 PGA Championship

Howard Twitty (11), Bobby Walzel

11. Winners of PGA Tour events since the previous Masters

John Cook, Bob Gilder, Phil Hancock, Scott Hoch, Peter Jacobsen, Wayne Levi, Bruce Lietzke, Mark Pfeil, Don Pooley, Scott Simpson, Mike Sullivan, Doug Tewell

12. Members of the U.S. 1979 Ryder Cup team

Lee Elder

13. Foreign invitations

Isao Aoki (9), Bruce Devlin (9), Duncan Evans (6,a), David Graham (4,8,11), Dan Halldorson (11), Sandy Lyle, Jack Newton (8), Greg Norman, Norio Suzuki

- Numbers in brackets indicate categories that the player would have qualified under had they been American.

== Round summaries ==
=== First round ===
Thursday, April 9, 1981

Place	Player	Score	To par
T1	(United States) Lon Hinkle	69	−3
T1	(United States) Johnny Miller	69	−3
T1	(Australia) Greg Norman	69	−3
T1	(United States) Curtis Strange	69	−3
T5	(Japan) Isao Aoki	70	−2
T5	(United States) John Cook	70	−2
T5	(Australia) David Graham	70	−2
T5	(United States) Hubert Green	70	−2
T5	(United States) Jim Holtgrieve (a)	70	−2
T5	(United States) Jack Nicklaus	70	−2
T5	(United States) Jim Simons	70	−2

=== Second round ===
Friday, April 10, 1981

Place	Player	Score	To par
1	(United States) Jack Nicklaus	70-65=135	−9
T2	(United States) Lon Hinkle	69-70=139	−5
T2	(United States) Bruce Lietzke	72-67=139	−5
T2	(Australia) Greg Norman	69-70=139	−5
T2	(United States) Tom Watson	71-68=139	−5
T6	(Australia) David Graham	70-70=140	−4
T6	(United States) Hubert Green	70-70=140	−4
T8	(United States) Jim Colbert	73-68=141	−3
T8	(United States) John Cook	70-71=141	−3
T8	(United States) Peter Jacobsen	71-70=141	−3
T8	(United States) Johnny Miller	69-72=141	−3

=== Third round ===
Saturday, April 11, 1981

Place	Player	Score	To par
1	(United States) Tom Watson	71-68-70=209	−7
2	(United States) Jack Nicklaus	70-65-75=210	−6
3	(Australia) Greg Norman	69-70-72=211	−5
T4	(United States) Bruce Lietzke	72-67-73=212	−4
T4	(United States) John Mahaffey	72-71-69=212	−4
T6	(United States) John Cook	70-71-72=213	−3
T6	(United States) Ben Crenshaw	71-72-70=213	−3
T6	(United States) Lon Hinkle	69-70-74=213	−3
T6	(United States) Peter Jacobsen	71-70-72=213	−3
T10	(United States) Gay Brewer	75-68-71=214	−2
T10	(Australia) David Graham	70-70-74=214	−2
T10	(United States) Hubert Green	70-70-74=214	−2
T10	(United States) Johnny Miller	69-72-73=214	−2
T10	(United States) Jerry Pate	71-72-71=214	−2
T10	(United States) Dave Stockton	72-72-70=214	−2
T10	(United States) Lanny Wadkins	72-71-71=214	−2

=== Final round ===
Sunday, April 12, 1981

==== Final leaderboard ====
Champion
Silver Cup winner (low amateur)
(a) = amateur
(c) = past champion

Top 10
Place	Player	Score	To par	Money (US$)
1	(United States) Tom Watson (c)	71-68-70-71=280	−8	60,000
T2	(United States) Johnny Miller	69-72-73-68=282	−6	30,500
T2	(United States) Jack Nicklaus (c)	70-65-75-72=282	−6	30,500
4	(Australia) Greg Norman	69-70-72-72=283	−5	16,000
T5	(United States) Tom Kite	74-72-70-68=284	−4	12,667
T5	(United States) Jerry Pate	71-72-71-70=284	−4	12,667
7	(Australia) David Graham	70-70-74-71=285	−3	11,167
T8	(United States) Ben Crenshaw	71-72-70-73=286	−2	9,667
T8	(United States) Raymond Floyd (c)	75-71-71-69=286	−2	9,667
T8	(United States) John Mahaffey	72-71-69-74=286	−2	9,667

Leaderboard below the top 10
Place	Player	Score	To par	Money ($)
T11	(United States) George Archer (c)	74-70-72-71=287	−1	7,333
T11	(United States) Hubert Green	70-70-74-73=287	−1	7,333
T11	(United States) Peter Jacobsen	71-70-72-74=287	−1	7,333
T11	(United States) Bruce Lietzke	72-67-73-75=287	−1	7,333
T15	(United States) Gay Brewer (c)	75-68-71-74=288	E	5,500
T15	(United States) Bob Gilder	72-75-69-72=288	E	5,500
T15	(South Africa) Gary Player (c)	73-73-71-71=288	E	5,500
T15	(United States) Jim Simons	70-75-71-72=288	E	5,500
T19	(United States) Don Pooley	71-75-72-71=289	+1	4,500
T19	(United States) Curtis Strange	69-79-70-71=289	+1	4,500
T21	(United States) John Cook	70-71-72-77=290	+2	3,600
T21	(United States) Gil Morgan	74-73-70-73=290	+2	3,600
T21	(United States) Calvin Peete	75-70-71-74=290	+2	3,600
T21	(United States) Lanny Wadkins	72-71-71-76=290	+2	3,600
T25	(United States) Jim Colbert	73-68-74-76=291	+3	2,700
T25	(United States) Hale Irwin	73-74-70-74=291	+3	2,700
T25	(United States) Wayne Levi	72-71-73-75=291	+3	2,700
T28	(United States) Gibby Gilbert	71-71-76-74=292	+4	2,350
T28	(United States) Lon Hinkle	69-70-74-79=292	+4	2,350
T28	(Scotland) Sandy Lyle	73-70-76-73=292	+4	2,350
T31	(Australia) Bruce Devlin	74-72-72-75=293	+5	2,013
T31	(United States) Jay Haas	75-71-72-75=293	+5	2,013
T31	(United States) Jack Renner	73-72-73-75=293	+5	2,013
T31	(United States) Dave Stockton	72-72-70-79=293	+5	2,013
T35	(United States) Jay Sigel (a)	72-75-75-72=294	+6	0
T35	(United States) Mike Sullivan	72-74-74-74=294	+6	1,800
T37	(United States) Keith Fergus	76-72-75-72=295	+7	1,617
T37	(United States) Scott Hoch	73-70-75-77=295	+7	1,617
T37	(United States) Bill Rogers	76-72-75-72=295	+7	1,617
T40	(United States) Charles Coody (c)	74-71-75-76=296	+8	1,500
T40	(United States) Bob Lewis (a)	77-70-73-76=296	+8	0
T40	(United States) Howard Twitty	75-72-74-75=296	+8	1,500
T43	(United States) Craig Stadler	76-71-73-77=297	+9	1,500
T43	(United States) Fuzzy Zoeller (c)	77-70-78-72=297	+9	1,500
T45	(Japan) Isao Aoki	70-76-77-77=300	+12	1,500
T45	(Japan) Norio Suzuki	74-74-75-77=300	+12	1,500
47	(United States) Jim Holtgrieve (a)	70-77-79-75=301	+13	0
48	(United States) Tommy Aaron (c)	77-71-76-79=303	+15	1,500
CUT	(United States) Andy Bean	75-74=149	+5	
CUT	(United States) Ed Fiori	72-77=149	+5	
CUT	(Canada) Dan Halldorson	76-73=149	+5	
CUT	(United States) Mark Pfeil	74-75=149	+5	
CUT	(United States) Scott Simpson	77-72=149	+5	
CUT	(United States) Bobby Wadkins	73-76=149	+5	
CUT	(United States) Lee Elder	77-73=150	+6	
CUT	(United States) J. C. Snead	72-78=150	+6	
CUT	(United States) Mark Hayes	76-75=151	+7	
CUT	(United States) Pat McGowan	73-78=151	+7	
CUT	(United States) Larry Nelson	78-73=151	+7	
CUT	(United States) Mike Reid	76-75=151	+7	
CUT	(United States) Bob Tway (a)	75-76=151	+7	
CUT	(Australia) Jack Newton	79-73=152	+8	
CUT	(United States) Joe Inman	74-79=153	+9	
CUT	(United States) Mike Morley	76-77=153	+9	
CUT	(United States) Arnold Palmer (c)	75-78=153	+9	
CUT	(United States) Ed Sneed	81-72=153	+9	
CUT	(United States) Doug Tewell	79-74=153	+9	
CUT	(United States) Bobby Walzel	75-78=153	+9	
CUT	(Spain) Seve Ballesteros (c)	78-76=154	+10	
CUT	(United States) Billy Casper (c)	76-78=154	+10	
CUT	(United States) Joe Hager	81-73=154	+10	
CUT	(United States) Lee Trevino	77-77=154	+10	
CUT	(United States) Doug Ford (c)	79-76=155	+11	
CUT	(United States) Bob Goalby (c)	80-75=155	+11	
CUT	(United States) Andy North	82-73=155	+11	
CUT	(United States) Sam Snead (c)	77-78=155	+11	
CUT	(United States) Hal Sutton (a)	80-75=155	+11	
CUT	(United States) Art Wall Jr. (c)	76-79=155	+11	
CUT	(United States) Billy Kratzert	83-75=158	+14	
CUT	(United States) Phil Hancock	82-77=159	+15	
CUT	(Wales) Duncan Evans (a)	81-79=160	+16	
CUT	(United States) Dick von Tacky (a)	76-85=161	+17	

==== Scorecard ====
Hole	1	2	3	4	5	6	7	8	9	10	11	12	13	14	15	16	17	18
Par	4	5	4	3	4	3	4	5	4	4	4	3	5	4	5	3	4	4
(United States) Watson	−7	−8	−8	−8	−8	−7	−7	−8	−7	−7	−7	−7	−7	−7	−8	−8	−8	−8
(United States) Miller	−3	−4	−4	−3	−3	−2	−2	−3	−4	−3	−3	−3	−4	−5	−5	−5	−6	−6
(United States) Nicklaus	−6	−6	−6	−6	−6	−6	−5	−5	−4	−4	−4	−4	−5	−4	−5	−6	−6	−6
(Australia) Norman	−5	−5	−4	−4	−4	−4	−5	−5	−5	−3	−3	−3	−4	−4	−5	−5	−5	−5
(United States) Kite	E	E	−1	−1	E	E	E	E	E	E	E	−1	−2	−2	−3	−3	−4	−4
(United States) Pate	−2	−3	−4	−3	−3	−2	−2	−2	−2	−3	−3	−1	−2	−2	−3	−3	−4	−4

Cumulative tournament scores, relative to par
