= 1989 Masters Tournament =

- Front cover of the 1989 Masters Guide

Tournament information
- Dates: April 6–9, 1989
- Location: Augusta, Georgia; 33.503°N 82.020°W
- Course: Augusta National Golf Club
- Organized by: Augusta National Golf Club
- Tour: PGA Tour

Statistics
- Par: 72
- Length: 6,905 yards (6,314 m)
- Field: 85 players, 52 after cut
- Cut: 151 (+7)
- Prize fund: $1.0 million
- Winner's share: $200,000

Champion
- (England) Nick Faldo
- 283 (−5), playoff

Location map
- Location in the United States Location in Georgia

The 1989 Masters Tournament was the 53rd Masters Tournament, held April 6–9 at Augusta National Golf Club in Augusta, Georgia.

Nick Faldo won the first of his three Masters titles, the second of his six major championships. After a third round 77 (+5), he shot a final round 65 (−7) and won with a birdie on the second hole of a sudden-death playoff with Scott Hoch. The 1989 Masters is remembered for Hoch missing a two-foot (0.6 m) putt on the first playoff hole that would have won him the green jacket. Greg Norman continued his misfortunes at the Masters with a bogey on the 72nd hole to miss a playoff by a stroke, similar to 1986. Third round leader Ben Crenshaw also bogeyed the final hole to tie Norman for third.

Faldo became the first man from England to win the Masters and was the second consecutive winner from the United Kingdom. Defending champion Sandy Lyle of Scotland missed the cut by two strokes, but made history at the champions' dinner on Tuesday by sporting a kilt and serving haggis.

== Field ==
1. Masters champions

Tommy Aaron, George Archer, Seve Ballesteros (3,9,12), Gay Brewer, Billy Casper, Charles Coody, Ben Crenshaw (9,10,13,14), Raymond Floyd (2,9), Doug Ford, Bernhard Langer (9), Sandy Lyle (3,13), Larry Mize (10,14), Jack Nicklaus (9), Arnold Palmer, Gary Player, Craig Stadler (9), Tom Watson (3,9), Fuzzy Zoeller (2,9,10)

- Jack Burke Jr., Bob Goalby, Claude Harmon, Ben Hogan, Herman Keiser, Cary Middlecoff, Byron Nelson, Henry Picard, Gene Sarazen, Sam Snead, and Art Wall Jr. did not play.

2. U.S. Open champions (last five years)

Andy North, Scott Simpson (10,14), Curtis Strange (9,12,13,14)

3. The Open champions (last five years)

Nick Faldo (10,11), Greg Norman (9,12,13)

4. PGA champions (last five years)

Hubert Green (9), Larry Nelson (12,13,14), Jeff Sluman (12,13), Lee Trevino, Bob Tway (13)

5. U.S. Amateur champion and runner-up

Eric Meeks (a), Danny Yates (a)

6. The Amateur champion

Cristian Härdin (a)

7. U.S. Amateur Public Links champion

Ralph Howe III (a)

8. U.S. Mid-Amateur champion

David Eger (a)

9. Top 24 players and ties from the 1988 Masters Tournament

Chip Beck (12,13), Mark Calcavecchia (12,13,14), Chen Tze-chung, Fred Couples (10,13), David Frost (12,13), Mark McCumber (13), Mark McNulty, Dan Pohl (10,11,13,14), Don Pooley, Nick Price, Doug Tewell, Lanny Wadkins (10,12,13,14)

10. Top 16 players and ties from the 1988 U.S. Open

Paul Azinger (11,13), Andy Bean (14), Bob Gilder (11), Mark O'Meara (12,13), Steve Pate (13), Payne Stewart (13,14), D. A. Weibring

11. Top eight players and ties from 1988 PGA Championship

Tom Kite (12,13,14), Tsuneyuki Nakajima, Dave Rummells

12. Winners of PGA Tour events since the previous Masters

Jim Benepe, Mark Brooks, Bill Glasson (13), Ken Green (13), Morris Hatalsky, Steve Jones, Gary Koch (13), Bruce Lietzke (13), Bob Lohr, Andrew Magee, Blaine McCallister, Jodie Mudd (13), Corey Pavin, Tom Purtzer, Mike Reid (13), Gene Sauers, Tom Sieckmann, Tim Simpson, Joey Sindelar (13), Mike Sullivan, Greg Twiggs, Scott Verplank

- Phil Blackmar, the winner of the Provident Classic was not invited.

13. Top 30 players from the 1988 PGA Tour money list

Jay Haas, Scott Hoch, Peter Jacobsen, Mark Wiebe

14. Members of the U.S. 1987 Ryder Cup team

Hal Sutton

15. Special foreign invitation

José María Olazábal, Masashi Ozaki, Ian Woosnam

== Round summaries ==
=== First round ===
Thursday, April 6, 1989

Lee Trevino, vying for an elusive Masters title, shot an opening round 67 to lead Nick Faldo by one shot. Only 10 players broke par on day one, including 1984 champion Ben Crenshaw and 1980 and 1983 champion Seve Ballesteros. Defending champion Sandy Lyle birdied 18 to shoot a disappointing 77.

Place	Player	Score	To par
1	(United States) Lee Trevino	67	−5
2	(England) Nick Faldo	68	−4
3	(United States) Scott Hoch	69	−3
T4	(United States) Andy Bean	70	−2
T4	(United States) Don Pooley	70	−2
T6	(Spain) Seve Ballesteros	71	−1
T6	(Taiwan) Chen Tze-chung	71	−1
T6	(United States) Ben Crenshaw	71	−1
T6	(Japan) Masashi Ozaki	71	−1
T6	(United States) Tom Purtzer	71	−1

=== Second round ===
Friday, April 7, 1989

Lee Trevino and Nick Faldo, who both shot over par on the day, shared the lead after a difficult scoring day. Only four players broke par including Ken Green, who shot 69 and had the round of the day. Seve Ballesteros shot 72 even though he had a 4 putt on the 15th hole.

Place	Player	Score	To par
T1	(England) Nick Faldo	68-73=141	−3
T1	(United States) Lee Trevino	67-74=141	−3
T3	(Spain) Seve Ballesteros	71-72=143	−1
T3	(United States) Ben Crenshaw	71-72=143	−1
T3	(United States) Ken Green	74-69=143	−1
T3	(United States) Scott Hoch	69-74=143	−1
T3	(United States) Mike Reid	72-71=143	−1
8	(United States) Tom Kite	72-72=144	E
T9	(United States) Mark O'Meara	74-71=145	+1
T9	(United States) Curtis Strange	74-71=145	+1
T9	(United States) Tom Watson	72-73=145	+1

Amateurs: Howe III (+12), Yates (+14), Eger (+18), Meeks (+18), Härdin (+26)

=== Third round ===
Saturday, April 8, 1989

Saturday was a long day that included a 90-minute delay and eventual suspension of play. Ben Crenshaw stormed to a four-shot lead at the suspension of play. Crenshaw was 3-under on the day through 13. Nick Faldo got off to a slow start with a double bogey on the first hole. On the second hole, he holed an improbable 100-foot (30 m) birdie putt, but was 3 over on the day through 12 holes. Out early, clubhouse leader Greg Norman posted a 68 to reach +1 and close within five shots of the lead when play was suspended. Lee Trevino, trying to complete the career Grand Slam, faded out of contention Saturday.

Place	Player	Score	To par	Hole
1	(United States) Ben Crenshaw	71-72-49=192	−4	13
T2	(England) Nick Faldo	68-73-50=191	E	12
T2	(United States) Scott Hoch	69-74-53=196	E	13
T2	(United States) Mike Reid	72-71-53=196	E	13

Sunday, April 9, 1989

For the first time since 1984, the third round was completed on Sunday morning. Conditions were ideal, but overnight leader Ben Crenshaw was unable to take advantage as his four-shot morning lead was cut to one by the end of the third round. Seve Ballesteros who was +3 at the suspension of play on Saturday birdied 14, 15, and 17 to get back to level par. Nick Faldo continued to struggle in the morning, playing his last six holes in two over par, to fall 5 shots out of the lead at the end of the third round. First and second round leader Lee Trevino couldn't get any momentum in the morning and stumbled to an 81.

Place	Player	Score	To par
1	(United States) Ben Crenshaw	71-72-70=213	−3
T2	(United States) Scott Hoch	69-74-71=214	−2
T2	(United States) Mike Reid	72-71-71=214	−2
T4	(Spain) Seve Ballesteros	71-72-73=216	E
T4	(United States) Ken Green	74-69-73=216	E
T4	(United States) Tom Kite	72-72-72=216	E
T7	(Australia) Greg Norman	74-75-68=217	+1
T7	(United States) Mark O'Meara	74-71-72=217	+1
T9	(England) Nick Faldo	68-73-77=218	+2
T9	(United States) Larry Mize	72-77-69=218	+2

=== Final round ===
Sunday, April 9, 1989

==== Summary ====
An exciting final round had six different players hold at least a share of the lead on the back nine. Nick Faldo, five shots back to start the round, birdied four of his first seven holes to post 32 on the front nine. Faldo continued his comeback with miraculous birdies on 16 and 17 to post 65 and hold the clubhouse lead at −5. In the round Faldo made eight birdies and just one bogey at the 11th hole. Mike Reid chipped in for birdie on the 12th hole to take sole possession of the lead for the first time in the tournament at −6. However, Reid missed a short putt for par on 14 and double-bogeyed 15 after hitting his approach into the water to fade to 6th place. Seve Ballesteros, who went out in 5-under 31, had held the lead earlier in the day and was still only 1 behind as he teed off on the par-3 16th but underhit his tee-shot into the water and took a double bogey. Ballesteros later birdied 18 to finish 3-under. Meanwhile, Greg Norman had stormed into contention with birdies on 9, 10, 13, 15, 16 and 17 to tie for the lead at 5-under. Norman, however, mis-clubbed his 2nd shot from the fairway on 18 and came up short. Subsequently, he was unable to get up and down from the chipping area fronting the green and made bogey, missing the playoff by one stroke.

In the end it came down to the final pairing of Ben Crenshaw and Scott Hoch. Hoch birdied the 15th to take sole possession of the lead at −6, but missed a short par putt at 17 to drop back to −5. Crenshaw, three back of the lead after the 15th hole, birdied 16 and 17 to share the lead with Hoch heading to the final hole. Both players hit the fairway off the tee, and then Hoch hit his approach on the green after Crenshaw missed in the front greenside bunker. After Crenshaw chipped out to 12 feet (4 m), Hoch had 25 feet (8 m) for birdie and his first major championship. Hoch barely missed his birdie putt and was able to tap in for par, tying Faldo for the clubhouse lead. Crenshaw then had 12 feet to join a playoff with Faldo and Hoch, but missed.

==== Final leaderboard ====
Champion
(a) = amateur
(c) = past champion

Top 10
Place	Player	Score	To par	Money (US$)
T1	(England) Nick Faldo	68-73-77-65=283	−5	Playoff
T1	(United States) Scott Hoch	69-74-71-69=283	−5	Playoff
T3	(United States) Ben Crenshaw (c)	71-72-70-71=284	−4	64,450
T3	(Australia) Greg Norman	74-75-68-67=284	−4	64,450
5	(Spain) Seve Ballesteros (c)	71-72-73-69=285	−3	44,400
6	(United States) Mike Reid	72-71-71-72=286	−2	40,000
7	(United States) Jodie Mudd	73-76-72-66=287	−1	37,200
T8	(United States) Chip Beck	74-76-70-68=288	E	32,200
T8	(Spain) José María Olazábal	77-73-70-68=288	E	32,200
T8	(United States) Jeff Sluman	74-72-74-68=288	E	32,200

Leaderboard below the top 10
Place	Player	Score	To par	Money ($)
T11	(United States) Fred Couples	72-76-74-67=289	+1	25,567
T11	(United States) Ken Green	74-69-73-73=289	+1	25,567
T11	(United States) Mark O'Meara	74-71-72-72=289	+1	25,567
T14	(United States) Paul Azinger	75-75-69-71=290	+2	19,450
T14	(United States) Don Pooley	70-77-76-67=290	+2	19,450
T14	(United States) Tom Watson (c)	72-73-74-71=290	+2	19,450
T14	(Wales) Ian Woosnam	74-76-71-69=290	+2	19,450
T18	(South Africa) David Frost	76-72-73-70=291	+3	14,000
T18	(United States) Tom Kite	72-72-72-75=291	+3	14,000
T18	(United States) Jack Nicklaus (c)	73-74-73-71=291	+3	14,000
T18	(Japan) Masashi Ozaki	71-75-73-72=291	+3	14,000
T18	(United States) Curtis Strange	74-71-74-72=291	+3	14,000
T18	(United States) Lee Trevino	67-74-81-69=291	+3	14,000
T24	(United States) Tom Purtzer	71-76-73-72=292	+4	10,250
T24	(United States) Payne Stewart	73-75-74-70=292	+4	10,250
T26	(West Germany) Bernhard Langer (c)	74-75-71-73=293	+5	8,240
T26	(United States) Larry Mize (c)	72-77-69-75=293	+5	8,240
T26	(United States) Steve Pate	76-75-74-68=293	+5	8,240
T26	(United States) Lanny Wadkins	76-71-73-73=293	+5	8,240
T26	(United States) Fuzzy Zoeller (c)	76-74-69-74=293	+5	8,240
T31	(United States) Mark Calcavecchia	74-72-74-74=294	+6	6,900
T31	(United States) Steve Jones	74-73-80-67=294	+6	6,900
T31	(United States) Dave Rummells	74-74-75-71=294	+6	6,900
T34	(United States) Hubert Green	74-75-76-71=296	+8	6,000
T34	(United States) Peter Jacobsen	74-73-78-71=296	+8	6,000
T34	(United States) Bruce Lietzke	74-75-79-68=296	+8	6,000
37	(United States) Bob Gilder	75-74-77-71=297	+9	5,400
T38	(United States) Tommy Aaron (c)	76-74-72-76=298	+10	4,900
T38	(United States) Charles Coody (c)	76-74-76-72=298	+10	4,900
T38	(United States) Raymond Floyd (c)	76-75-73-74=298	+10	4,900
T38	(United States) Scott Simpson	72-77-72-77=298	+10	4,900
42	(United States) Dan Pohl	72-74-78-75=299	+11	4,300
T43	(United States) George Archer (c)	75-75-75-75=300	+12	3,900
T43	(United States) Mark McCumber	72-75-81-72=300	+12	3,900
T43	(United States) Greg Twiggs	75-76-79-70=300	+12	3,900
T46	(United States) Jay Haas	73-77-79-72=301	+13	3,125
T46	(United States) Bob Lohr	75-76-77-73=301	+13	3,125
T46	(United States) Mike Sullivan	76-74-73-78=301	+13	3,125
T46	(United States) D. A. Weibring	72-79-74-76=301	+13	3,125
50	(United States) Corey Pavin	74-74-78-76=302	+14	2,800
51	(United States) Andy Bean	70-80-77-77=304	+16	2,700
52	(Taiwan) Chen Tze-chung	71-75-76-84=306	+18	2,600
CUT	(United States) Andy North	77-75=152	+8	
CUT	(United States) Tim Simpson	75-77=152	+8	
CUT	(United States) Mark Wiebe	77-75=152	+8	
CUT	(United States) Billy Casper (c)	75-78=153	+9	
CUT	(Scotland) Sandy Lyle (c)	77-76=153	+9	
CUT	(United States) Andrew Magee	73-80=153	+9	
CUT	(United States) Blaine McCallister	76-77=153	+9	
CUT	(United States) Larry Nelson	77-76=153	+9	
CUT	(South Africa) Gary Player (c)	76-77=153	+9	
CUT	(United States) Gene Sauers	74-79=153	+9	
CUT	(United States) Joey Sindelar	75-78=153	+9	
CUT	(United States) Craig Stadler (c)	74-79=153	+9	
CUT	(United States) Bill Glasson	77-77=154	+10	
CUT	(United States) Tom Sieckmann	79-75=154	+10	
CUT	(United States) Hal Sutton	72-82=154	+10	
CUT	(United States) Bob Tway	77-77=154	+10	
CUT	(United States) Mark Brooks	77-78=155	+11	
CUT	(Zimbabwe) Mark McNulty	80-75=155	+11	
CUT	(United States) Ralph Howe III (a)	77-79=156	+12	
CUT	(United States) Gary Koch	76-80=156	+12	
CUT	(United States) Jim Benepe	82-75=157	+13	
CUT	(Japan) Tsuneyuki Nakajima	76-81=157	+13	
CUT	(Zimbabwe) Nick Price	76-82=158	+14	
CUT	(United States) Doug Tewell	77-81=158	+14	
CUT	(United States) Scott Verplank	79-79=158	+14	
CUT	(United States) Danny Yates (a)	81-77=158	+14	
CUT	(United States) Morris Hatalsky	78-81=159	+15	
CUT	(United States) Arnold Palmer (c)	81-80=161	+17	
CUT	(United States) David Eger (a)	84-78=162	+18	
CUT	(United States) Eric Meeks (a)	83-79=162	+18	
CUT	(United States) Doug Ford (c)	81-82=163	+19	
CUT	(Sweden) Cristian Härdin (a)	85-85=170	+26	
WD	(United States) Gay Brewer (c)	83	+11	

==== Scorecard ====
Hole	1	2	3	4	5	6	7	8	9	10	11	12	13	14	15	16	17	18
Par	4	5	4	3	4	3	4	5	4	4	4	3	5	4	5	3	4	4
(England) Faldo	+1	E	E	−1	−1	−1	−2	−2	−2	−2	−1	−1	−2	−3	−3	−4	−5	−5
(United States) Hoch	−2	−3	−3	−3	−4	−4	−4	−4	−5	−5	−5	−5	−5	−5	−6	−6	−5	−5
(United States) Crenshaw	−3	−3	−3	−3	−2	−2	−3	−4	−4	−4	−4	−3	−3	−3	−3	−4	−5	−4
(Australia) Norman	E	E	+1	+1	+1	+1	+1	+1	E	−1	−1	−1	−2	−2	−3	−4	−5	−4
(Spain) Ballesteros	−1	−2	−2	−3	−4	−4	−4	−4	−5	−4	−4	−4	−4	−4	−4	−2	−2	−3
(United States) Reid	−2	−3	−2	−2	−2	−3	−3	−4	−5	−5	−5	−6	−6	−5	−3	−3	−3	−2

Cumulative tournament scores, relative to par

Birdie	Bogey	Double bogey

=== Playoff ===
Faldo and Hoch were in the tenth playoff in Masters history and the fourth to use the sudden death format. The playoff began at the 10th hole, where both had made par every day. Both hit the fairway, but Faldo pushed his approach in the short right side bunker. Hoch then played safely, hitting the front middle of the green, leaving an uphill birdie putt. After Faldo chipped out to 15 feet (5 m), Hoch had 25 feet (8 m) to win his first major championship. Hoch lagged his putt up to 2 feet, forcing Faldo to make his 15 footer for par. Faldo missed, but made his 4-foot comebacker for a bogey five. Hoch then had his third putt of the day to win the championship, but missed, then made the 4-foot comebacker for bogey to extend the playoff.

The playoff went to the 11th hole, which Faldo had bogeyed in all four rounds. After Faldo hit his approach to 25 feet, Hoch pushed his approach right of the green. Hoch chipped to six feet, but Faldo made his long birdie putt for his second major championship and first Masters title.

Place	Player	Score	To par	Money ($)
1	(England) Nick Faldo	5-3	E	200,000
2	(United States) Scott Hoch	5-x		120,000
