= 1987 Masters Tournament =

- Front cover of the 1987 Masters Guide

Tournament information
- Dates: April 9−12, 1987
- Location: Augusta, Georgia; 33.503°N 82.020°W
- Course: Augusta National Golf Club
- Organized by: Augusta National Golf Club
- Tour: PGA Tour

Statistics
- Par: 72
- Length: 6,905 yards (6,314 m)
- Field: 85 players, 54 after cut
- Cut: 151 (+7)
- Prize fund: $867,100
- Winner's share: $162,000

Champion
- (United States) Larry Mize
- 285 (−3), playoff
- Location in the United States Location in Georgia

The 1987 Masters Tournament was the 51st Masters Tournament, held April 9−12 at Augusta National Golf Club in Augusta, Georgia. Augusta native Larry Mize won his only major championship in a sudden-death playoff over Seve Ballesteros and Greg Norman. Norman had barely missed a 20-foot (6 m) birdie opportunity on the 72nd hole which would have won him the tournament in regulation.

The playoff began on the par-4 10th hole, where the approach shots of Ballesteros and Norman came to rest on the fringe, and Mize's was on the green, below the hole. Ballesteros failed to par and was eliminated while Norman two-putted for four. Mize's uphill birdie putt came up short and he tapped in to continue with Norman. Both of their tee shots were in the fairway on the next hole, the par-4 11th, but with the pond on the left of the green, Mize's avoidant approach shot was about pin-high but well right, about 140 feet (45 m) from the hole. Norman then played conservatively to the right fringe, with a 50-foot (15 m) putt, sensing a par could win the green jacket. But Mize chipped in for an improbable birdie 3 and a stunned Norman failed to hole his to tie, which ended the tournament. Mize was the first, and only winner of the Masters to come from Augusta.

It was considered one of the most miraculous shots (and endings) in major championship history, and was just one of the many "bad breaks" in Norman's career.

== Field ==
1. Masters champions

Tommy Aaron, Seve Ballesteros (3,8), Gay Brewer, Billy Casper, Charles Coody, Ben Crenshaw (8,9,11,12), Raymond Floyd (2,4,9,11,12,13), Doug Ford, Bernhard Langer (8,9,12), Jack Nicklaus (8,9), Arnold Palmer, Gary Player, Craig Stadler (9,13), Art Wall Jr., Tom Watson (2,3,8,12), Fuzzy Zoeller (2,8,9,11,12,13)

- George Archer, Jack Burke Jr., Bob Goalby, Ralph Guldahl, Claude Harmon, Ben Hogan, Herman Keiser, Cary Middlecoff, Byron Nelson, Henry Picard, Gene Sarazen, and Sam Snead did not play.

2. U.S. Open champions (last five years)

Larry Nelson, Andy North (13)

3. The Open champions (last five years)

Sandy Lyle (8,11), Greg Norman (8,9,10,11,12)

4. PGA champions (last five years)

Hubert Green (13), Hal Sutton (9,11,12,13), Lee Trevino (9), Bob Tway (8,9,10,11,12)

5. 1986 U.S. Amateur semi-finalists

Buddy Alexander (6,7,a), Chris Kite (a), Bob Lewis (7,a), Brian Montgomery (a)

6. Previous two U.S. Amateur and Amateur champions

David Curry (a), Garth McGimpsey (a)

- Sam Randolph forfeited his exemption by turning professional.

7. Members of the 1986 U.S. Eisenhower Trophy team

Billy Andrade (a), Jay Sigel (a)

8. Top 24 players and ties from the 1986 Masters Tournament

Dave Barr, Chen Tze-chung (11), Jay Haas, Donnie Hammond (12), Tom Kite (11,12,13), Gary Koch (9), Roger Maltbie, Mark McCumber (9), Larry Mize (12), Tsuneyuki Nakajima, Corey Pavin (11,12), Calvin Peete (12,13), Nick Price, Payne Stewart (9,10,11,12), Curtis Strange (11,13)

9. Top 16 players and ties from the 1986 U.S. Open

Chip Beck, Mark Calcavecchia (11), David Frost, David Graham (10), Jodie Mudd, Joey Sindelar (12), Scott Verplank, Bobby Wadkins (12), Lanny Wadkins (11,143), Denis Watson

10. Top eight players and ties from 1986 PGA Championship

Mike Hulbert (11,12), Bruce Lietzke, Jim Thorpe (11,12), D. A. Weibring

- Peter Jacobsen (13) did not play.

11. Winners of PGA Tour events since the previous Masters

Paul Azinger (12), Andy Bean (12), George Burns, Rick Fehr, Ernie Gonzalez, Ken Green (12), Johnny Miller, Bob Murphy, Mac O'Grady (12), Dan Pohl (12), Gene Sauers, Scott Simpson, Fred Wadsworth, Mark Wiebe (12)

12. Top 30 players from the 1986 PGA Tour money list

John Cook, Kenny Knox, John Mahaffey, Mark O'Meara (13), Don Pooley, Doug Tewell

13. Members of the U.S. 1985 Ryder Cup team

14. Special foreign invitation

Isao Aoki, Howard Clark, José María Olazábal, Masashi Ozaki

== Round summaries ==
=== First round ===
Thursday, April 9, 1987

Place	Player	Score	To par
1	(United States) John Cook	69	−3
2	(United States) Larry Mize	70	−2
T3	(West Germany) Bernhard Langer	71	−1
T3	(United States) Corey Pavin	71	−1
T3	(United States) Calvin Peete	71	−1
T3	(United States) Payne Stewart	71	−1
T3	(United States) Curtis Strange	71	−1
T3	(United States) Tom Watson	71	−1
T9	(United States) Tommy Aaron	72	E
T9	(United States) Jay Haas	72	E
T9	(United States) Mac O'Grady	72	E
T9	(United States) Scott Simpson	72	E
T9	(United States) D. A. Weibring	72	E

=== Second round ===
Friday, April 10, 1987

Place	Player	Score	To par
1	(United States) Curtis Strange	71-70=141	−3
T2	(United States) John Cook	69-73=142	−2
T2	(United States) Roger Maltbie	76-66=142	−2
T2	(United States) Larry Mize	70-72=142	−2
T2	(United States) Corey Pavin	71-71=142	−2
T6	(Taiwan) Chen Tze-chung	74-69=143	−1
T6	(West Germany) Bernhard Langer	71-72=143	−1
T6	(United States) Tom Watson	71-72=143	−1
T9	(Spain) Seve Ballesteros	73-71=144	E
T9	(United States) Andy Bean	75-69=144	E
T9	(United States) Jay Haas	72-72=144	E
T9	(United States) Joey Sindelar	74-70=144	E

=== Third round ===
Saturday, April 11, 1987

Place	Player	Score	To par
T1	(United States) Ben Crenshaw	75-70-67=212	−4
T1	(United States) Roger Maltbie	76-66-70=212	−4
T3	(West Germany) Bernhard Langer	71-72-70=213	−3
T3	(Australia) Greg Norman	73-74-66=213	−3
T5	(Spain) Seve Ballesteros	73-71-70=214	−2
T5	(Taiwan) Chen Tze-chung	74-69-71=214	−2
T5	(United States) Larry Mize	70-72-72=214	−2
T5	(United States) Curtis Strange	71-70-73=214	−2
T9	(United States) Mark McCumber	75-71-69=215	−1
T9	(United States) Lanny Wadkins	73-72-70=215	−1

=== Final round ===
External videos
- Full final round coverage on CBS on YouTube

Sunday, April 12, 1987

==== Final leaderboard ====
Champion
Silver Cup winner (low amateur)
(a) = amateur
(c) = past champion

Top 10
Place	Player	Score	To par	Money (US$)
T1	(Spain) Seve Ballesteros (c)	73-71-70-71=285	−3	Playoff
T1	(United States) Larry Mize	70-72-72-71=285	−3	Playoff
T1	(Australia) Greg Norman	73-74-66-72=285	−3	Playoff
T4	(United States) Ben Crenshaw (c)	75-70-67-74=286	−2	37,200
T4	(United States) Roger Maltbie	76-66-70-74=286	−2	37,200
T4	(United States) Jodie Mudd	74-72-71-69=286	−2	37,200
T7	(United States) Jay Haas	72-72-72-73=289	+1	26,200
T7	(West Germany) Bernhard Langer (c)	71-72-70-76=289	+1	26,200
T7	(United States) Jack Nicklaus (c)	74-72-73-70=289	+1	26,200
T7	(United States) Tom Watson (c)	71-72-74-72=289	+1	26,200
T7	(United States) D. A. Weibring	72-75-71-71=289	+1	26,200

Leaderboard below the top 10
Place	Player	Score	To par	Money ($)
T12	(United States) Chip Beck	75-72-70-73=290	+2	17,640
T12	(Taiwan) Chen Tze-chung	74-69-71-76=290	+2	17,640
T12	(United States) Mark McCumber	75-71-69-75=290	+2	17,640
T12	(United States) Curtis Strange	71-70-73-76=290	+2	17,640
T12	(United States) Lanny Wadkins	73-72-70-75=290	+2	17,640
T17	(United States) Paul Azinger	77-73-69-72=291	+3	13,050
T17	(United States) Mark Calcavecchia	73-72-78-68=291	+3	13,050
T17	(Scotland) Sandy Lyle	77-74-68-72=291	+3	13,050
T17	(United States) Craig Stadler (c)	74-74-72-71=291	+3	13,050
21	(United States) Bobby Wadkins	76-69-73-74=292	+4	10,800
T22	(United States) Gary Koch	76-75-72-70=293	+5	9,750
T22	(Zimbabwe) Nick Price	73-73-71-76=293	+5	9,750
T24	(United States) John Cook	69-73-74-78=294	+6	7,900
T24	(United States) Tom Kite	73-74-74-73=294	+6	7,900
T24	(United States) Mark O'Meara	75-74-71-74=294	+6	7,900
T27	(Australia) David Graham	73-77-72-73=295	+7	6,267
T27	(United States) Donnie Hammond	73-75-74-73=295	+7	6,267
T27	(United States) Corey Pavin	71-71-81-72=295	+7	6,267
T27	(United States) Scott Simpson	72-75-72-76=295	+7	6,267
T27	(Zimbabwe) Denis Watson	76-74-73-72=295	+7	6,267
T27	(United States) Fuzzy Zoeller (c)	76-71-76-72=295	+7	6,267
T33	(United States) Calvin Peete	71-77-75-73=296	+8	5,200
T33	(United States) Gene Sauers	75-73-74-74=296	+8	5,200
T35	(United States) Andy Bean	75-69-78-75=297	+9	4,257
T35	(England) Howard Clark	74-71-77-75=297	+9	4,257
T35	(United States) Hubert Green	80-71-74-72=297	+9	4,257
T35	(United States) John Mahaffey	73-75-76-73=297	+9	4,257
T35	(South Africa) Gary Player (c)	75-75-71-76=297	+9	4,257
T35	(United States) Joey Sindelar	74-70-81-72=297	+9	4,257
T35	(United States) Mark Wiebe	73-74-71-79=297	+9	4,257
T42	(United States) Johnny Miller	75-75-71-77=298	+10	3,333
T42	(United States) Payne Stewart	71-75-74-78=298	+10	3,333
T42	(United States) Jim Thorpe	77-74-76-71=298	+10	3,333
T45	(South Africa) David Frost	75-70-77-78=300	+12	2,800
T45	(United States) Kenny Knox	75-75-75-75=300	+12	2,800
T45	(United States) Don Pooley	76-75-76-73=300	+12	2,800
48	(United States) Mike Hulbert	76-75-71-79=301	+13	2,400
49	(United States) Bruce Lietzke	75-74-77-76=302	+14	2,300
T50	(United States) Tommy Aaron (c)	72-76-76-81=305	+17	2,200
T50	(Canada) Dave Barr	79-68-79-79=305	+17	2,200
T50	(United States) Billy Casper (c)	77-74-75-79=305	+17	2,200
T50	(United States) Mac O'Grady	72-79-79-75=305	+17	2,200
54	(United States) Bob Lewis (a)	74-77-79-79=309	+21	0
CUT	(United States) Buddy Alexander (a)	76-76=152	+8	
CUT	(United States) Billy Andrade (a)	74-78=152	+8	
CUT	(United States) George Burns	78-74=152	+8	
CUT	(United States) Raymond Floyd (c)	75-77=152	+8	
CUT	(United States) Dan Pohl	81-71=152	+8	
CUT	(United States) Scott Verplank	76-76=152	+8	
CUT	(United States) Rick Fehr	78-75=153	+9	
CUT	(United States) Andy North	79-74=153	+9	
CUT	(United States) Hal Sutton	77-76=153	+9	
CUT	(United States) Bob Tway	78-75=153	+9	
CUT	(Japan) Tsuneyuki Nakajima	73-81=154	+10	
CUT	(United States) Larry Nelson	75-79=154	+10	
CUT	(Spain) José María Olazábal	79-75=154	+10	
CUT	(United States) Charles Coody (c)	75-80=155	+11	
CUT	(United States) Ken Green	78-77=155	+11	
CUT	(United States) Bob Murphy	82-73=155	+11	
CUT	(Japan) Masashi Ozaki	73-82=155	+11	
CUT	(England) David Curry (a)	78-78=156	+12	
CUT	(United States) Chris Kite (a)	80-76=156	+12	
CUT	(Northern Ireland) Garth McGimpsey (a)	79-77=156	+12	
CUT	(United States) Lee Trevino	80-76=156	+12	
CUT	(United States) Fred Wadsworth	74-82=156	+12	
CUT	(United States) Ernie Gonzalez	77-80=157	+13	
CUT	(Japan) Isao Aoki	81-77=158	+14	
CUT	(United States) Doug Ford (c)	79-81=160	+16	
CUT	(United States) Arnold Palmer (c)	83-77=160	+16	
CUT	(United States) Jay Sigel (a)	77-83=160	+16	
CUT	(United States) Gay Brewer (c)	80-81=161	+17	
CUT	(United States) Brian Montgomery (a)	77-84=161	+17	
CUT	(United States) Doug Tewell	85-76=161	+17	
CUT	(United States) Art Wall Jr. (c)	85-76=161	+17	

==== Scorecard ====
Hole	1	2	3	4	5	6	7	8	9	10	11	12	13	14	15	16	17	18
Par	4	5	4	3	4	3	4	5	4	4	4	3	5	4	5	3	4	4
(United States) Mize	−2	−3	−2	−1	−1	−2	−3	−3	−3	−2	−2	−3	−4	−3	−2	−2	−2	−3
(Australia) Norman	−4	−4	−3	−3	−4	−3	−2	−2	−2	−1	E	−1	−2	−2	−3	−2	−3	−3
(Spain) Ballesteros	−2	−2	−2	−2	−2	−1	−1	−1	−2	−2	−1	−1	−1	−1	−2	−2	−3	−3
(United States) Crenshaw	−4	−5	−5	−5	−5	−4	−3	−3	−3	−3	−3	−3	−3	−3	−3	−3	−2	−2
(United States) Maltbie	−4	−4	−4	−4	−4	−3	−3	−4	−4	−3	−2	−2	−2	−1	−1	−1	−2	−2
(West Germany) Langer	−3	−3	−2	−2	−2	−2	−2	−2	−3	−2	−2	−1	−1	E	+1	+1	+1	+1
(Taiwan) Chen	−2	−3	−2	−2	−2	−2	−2	−2	−2	−2	E	E	+1	+1	E	+1	+2	+2
(United States) Strange	−2	−1	−1	−2	−2	−3	−3	−3	−2	−1	+1	+2	+2	+1	+2	+1	+2	+2

Cumulative tournament scores, relative to par

Birdie	Bogey	Double bogey

=== Playoff ===
Place	Player	Score	To par	Money ($)
1	(United States) Larry Mize	4-3	−1	162,000
T2	(Australia) Greg Norman	4-x		79,200
T2	(Spain) Seve Ballesteros	5-		79,200

- Sudden-death playoff began on hole #10 and ended at hole #11, where Mize birdied.
