= 1989 Masters =

1989 Masters may refer to:

- 1989 Masters Tournament, golf
- 1989 Masters (snooker)
- 1989 Nabisco Masters, tennis
