= 1987 PGA Championship =

Coordinates: 26.829°N 80.141°W

Tournament information
- Dates: August 6–9, 1987
- Location: Palm Beach Gardens, Florida
- Course(s): PGA National Golf Club; Champion Course
- Organized by: PGA of America
- Tour: PGA Tour

Statistics
- Par: 72
- Length: 7,002 yards (6,403 m)
- Field: 150 players, 74 after cut
- Cut: 151 (+7)
- Prize fund: $900,000
- Winner's share: $150,000

Champion
- (United States) Larry Nelson
- 287 (−1), playoff

Location in the United States
Location in Florida

The 1987 PGA Championship was the 69th PGA Championship, held August 6–9 at the Champion Course of PGA National Golf Club in Palm Beach Gardens, Florida. In hot and windy conditions, Larry Nelson won his second PGA Championship in a sudden-death playoff over 1977 champion Lanny Wadkins. It was Nelson's third and final major title.

D.A. Weibring, a 54-hole co-leader, shot 76 (+4) and finished a stroke back at even-par 288. The other co-leader, Mark McCumber, posted 77 and finished in a tie for fifth. Two major champions in contention shot high scores and fell back: Seve Ballesteros (78) and Raymond Floyd (80).

In the August heat of Florida, the attendance was low. A record high temperature for the day of 97 °F (36 °C) was recorded on Sunday. It was the second major played in Florida, following the PGA Championship in 1971, played in February at the old PGA National. Through 2021, this is the last major played in the state. The purse was the last under $1 million at the PGA Championship.

With the win, Nelson gained an automatic bid to the Ryder Cup team in 1987, his third, bumping Don Pooley. Nelson's record in that competition in late September was 0–3–1, as the U.S. lost the Cup for the first time on home soil. He lost all three pairs matches and halved his singles match.

The Champion Course hosted the Ryder Cup in 1983 and the Senior PGA Championship for 19 years (1982–2000). Since 2007, it has been the venue of The Honda Classic on the PGA Tour, played in March.

== Round summaries ==
=== First round ===
Thursday, August 6, 1987

Place	Player	Score	To par
1	(United States) Bobby Wadkins	68	−4
T2	(United States) David Edwards	69	−3
T2	(United States) Fred Funk	69	−3
T4	(United States) Raymond Floyd	70	−2
T4	(West Germany) Bernhard Langer	70	−2
T4	(United States) Larry Nelson	70	−2
T4	(United States) Curtis Strange	70	−2
T4	(United States) Lanny Wadkins	70	−2
T9	(United States) Bobby Clampett	71	−1
T9	(South Africa) Bobby Cole	71	−1
T9	(United States) Ray Freeman	71	−1
T9	(United States) Dan Pohl	71	−1
T9	(United States) Mike Reid	71	−1
T9	(United States) Tim Simpson	71	−1

=== Second round ===
Saturday, August 7, 1987

Place	Player	Score	To par
T1	(United States) Raymond Floyd	70-70=140	−4
T1	(United States) Lanny Wadkins	70-70=140	−4
T3	(United States) Tim Simpson	71-70=141	−3
T3	(United States) Jeff Sluman	72-69=141	−3
T5	(Spain) Seve Ballesteros	72-70=142	−2
T5	(United States) Ben Crenshaw	72-70=142	−2
T5	(United States) Larry Nelson	70-72=142	−2
T5	(United States) Bobby Wadkins	68-74=142	−2
T9	(United States) Bobby Clampett	71-72=143	−1
T9	(United States) Mark McCumber	74-69=143	−1

=== Third round ===
Saturday, August 8, 1987

Place	Player	Score	To par
T1	(United States) Mark McCumber	74-69-69=212	−4
T1	(United States) D. A. Weibring	73-72-67=212	−4
T3	(United States) Raymond Floyd	70-70-73=213	−3
T3	(United States) Bobby Wadkins	68-74-71=213	−3
T5	(Spain) Seve Ballesteros	72-70-72=214	−2
T5	(United States) Lanny Wadkins	70-70-74=214	−2
7	(United States) Larry Nelson	70-72-73=215	−1
T8	(United States) Ben Crenshaw	72-70-74=216	E
T8	(South Africa) David Frost	75-70-71=216	E
T10	(United States) Curt Byrum	74-75-68=217	+1
T10	(United States) Don Pooley	73-71-73=217	+1
T10	(Zimbabwe) Nick Price	76-71-70=217	+1
T10	(United States) Curtis Strange	70-76-71=217	+1

=== Final round ===
Sunday, August 9, 1987

Place	Player	Score	To par	Money ($)
T1	(United States) Larry Nelson	70-72-73-72=287	−1	Playoff
T1	(United States) Lanny Wadkins	70-70-74-73=287	−1	Playoff
T3	(United States) Scott Hoch	74-74-71-69=288	E	58,750
T3	(United States) D. A. Weibring	73-72-67-76=288	E	58,750
T5	(United States) Mark McCumber	74-69-69-77=289	+1	37,500
T5	(United States) Don Pooley	73-71-73-72=289	+1	37,500
T7	(United States) Ben Crenshaw	72-70-74-74=290	+2	27,500
T7	(United States) Bobby Wadkins	68-74-71-77=290	+2	27,500
9	(United States) Curtis Strange	70-76-71-74=291	+3	22,500
T10	(Spain) Seve Ballesteros	72-70-72-78=292	+4	17,000
T10	(South Africa) David Frost	75-70-71-76=292	+4	17,000
T10	(United States) Tom Kite	72-77-71-72=292	+4	17,000
T10	(Zimbabwe) Nick Price	76-71-70-75=292	+4	17,000

=== Scorecard ===
Birdie	Bogey	Double bogey

Final round

Hole	1	2	3	4	5	6	7	8	9	10	11	12	13	14	15	16	17	18
Par	4	4	5	3	4	5	3	4	4	4	5	4	4	4	3	4	3	5
(United States) Nelson	−1	E	−1	−2	−2	−2	−2	−2	−2	−2	−2	−2	−2	−1	−1	E	−1	−1
(United States) Wadkins	−3	−1	−2	−3	−3	−3	−3	−2	−1	−1	−2	E	E	E	−1	−1	−1	−1

Cumulative tournament scores, relative to par

=== Playoff ===
The sudden-death playoff began on the par-4 10th hole, where both missed the green. Nelson chipped to six feet (1.8 m) and Wadkins to four. First to putt, Nelson saved par but Wadkins missed his attempt to extend the playoff.

Place	Player	Score	To par	Money ($)
1	(United States) Larry Nelson	4	E	150,000
2	(United States) Lanny Wadkins	x	+1	90,000
