= 1987 Masters =

1987 Masters may refer to:

- 1987 Masters Tournament, golf
- 1987 Masters (snooker)
- 1987 Nabisco Masters, tennis
