= 1988 Masters =

1988 Masters may refer to:

- 1988 Masters Tournament, golf
- 1988 Masters (snooker)
- 1988 Nabisco Masters, tennis
