= Cristian Härdin =

Swedish professional golfer

Personal information
- Full name: Per Tomas Cristian Härdin
- Nickname: Kricken
- Nationality: Sweden
- Born: 5 October 1967 (age 59) Gävle, Sweden
- Height: 1.82 m (6 ft 0 in)
- Spouse: Anna Härdin
- Children: 3

Career
- Sport: Golf
- Turned professional: 1989
- Former tours: European Tour; Challenge Tour
- Professional wins: 1

Best results in major championships
- Masters Tournament: CUT: 1989
- PGA Championship: DNP
- U.S. Open: DNP
- The Open Championship: CUT: 1988

Per Tomas Cristian Härdin (born 5 October 1967) is a Swedish professional golfer, who was the first Scandinavian player to win The Amateur Championship and to play in the Masters Tournament.

Härdin's first name is officially spelled Cristian, but his name is in most tournament result reports spelled in the more common way Christian Härdin.

== Early years ==
Härdin grew up in Gävle, in the Gästrikland province, part of Norrland, the northern half av Sweden. He is son of Per-Olof "Pärra" Härdin (1937-2021), who was a famous ice hockey player, member of the Swedish national team winning the 1962 IIHF Ice Hockey World Championships.

12 years old in 1976, joining his father, his mother Birgitta and his two brothers Per and Anders, Härdin learned golf at Gävle Golf Club, one of the leading elite clubs in Sweden at the time. Among his club mates were future European Tour winners Adam Mednick and Peter Hedblom.

Härdin's father was a keen golfer and the two of them won the 1992 Swedish Father & Son Championship, played as foursome, scoring 152 over 36 holes at Ullna Golf Club in Stockholm.

== Amateur career ==
Härdin was a member of the Swedish team, along with Håkan Eriksson, Magnus Grankvist, Fredrik Lindgren, Jesper Parnevik and Johan Ryström, finishing bronze medalists at the 1984 European Youth's Team Championship at Hermitage Golf Club, Ireland. Twice representing Sweden at the Eisenhower Trophy, 1986 in Caracas, Venezuela and 1988 on home soil in Stockholm, Sweden, his team on both occasions closely missed the podium, finishing fourth. Härdin himself finished individually tied 13th in 1986 and tied 18th in 1988.

In August 1985, Härdin won the inaugural Nordic Championship, a tournament replacing the discontinued Scandinavian Match-play Championship, at Aura Golf in Turku, Finland, with a 2-under-par-score of 286, five strokes ahead of nearest competitor.

Härdin's greatest amateur achievement came in 1988, when he won The Amateur Championship at Royal Porthcawl Golf Club, Wales, beating Ben Fouchee, South Africa in the final, 1 up. Härdin's club mate Adam Mednick caddied for him after Mednick had lost and been kicked out from the tournament in an early round.

The week after his British Amateur triumph, Härdin proved to be one of the best amateurs in Europe at the time, finishing tied runner-up at the 1988 individual European Amateur Championship at Hamburger Golf Club Falkenstein, Germany, after an invited Australian player. Härdin earned the silver medal on a tie breaking better last 18 holes.

Härdin's British Amateur win earned him an invitation to The 117th Open Championship at Royal Lytham & St. Annes Golf Club, England the same year. He missed the cut by six strokes.

He also, as the first Scandinavian player ever, received an invitation to play in the Masters Tournament in April 1989. It was also the first time a male Swedish player participated in a professional major tournament in the United States. However, staying in the northern part of Sweden during the winter, having not played a tournament round since the Eisenhower Trophy in September 1988, Härdin was not able to be competitive at his first visit to Augusta National. He has later admitted that his performance did have a bad effect on his confidence and his continuing playing career.

== Professional career ==
After the Masters Tournament in April 1989, Härdin declined invitations to the 1989 U.S. Open and the Memorial Tournament and turned professional.

He played on the Swedish Golf Tour, the Challenge Tour and the European Tour until 1995. His best finish on the European Tour was tied 38th at the 1993 Madeira Island Open on Madeira, Portugal, 12 strokes behind winner Mark James.

After his playing career, he became head professional at Barsebäck Golf & Country Club in Löddeköpinge, Scania province, in southern Sweden.

His only professional win came in 2008, during his time as an instructing professional, at the Swedish mini tour event Gefle Open, a former Challenge Tour tournament, in his old home town Gävle.

== Awards, honors ==
In 1989, Härdin received Elite Sign No. 80 by the Swedish Golf Federation, on the basis of national team appearances and national championship performances.

At the 100 years anniversary of the Swedish Golf Federation in 2004, Härdin was, by the Svensk Golf magazine, ranked 44th among the 100 most important persons in the history of Swedish golf.

In 2012, Härdin was awarded the Barbro Montgomery Leadership Award of the Swedish Golf Federation, for his contributions to the sport at Barsebäck Golf & Country Club.

In 2012, Härdin also was awarded Swedish PGA Professional of the Year by the PGA of Sweden for his work as instructing professional.

== Amateur wins ==
- 1985 Nordic Championship
- 1988 The Amateur Championship

== Professional wins (1) ==
=== Swedish Mini Tour wins (1) ===
No.	Date	Tournament	Winning score	Margin of victory	Runner-up
1	9 Aug 2008	Gefle Open	−4 (72-68=140)	1 stroke	(Sweden) Erik Oja

== Results in major championships ==
Tournament	1988	1989
Masters Tournament		CUT
U.S. Open		
The Open Championship	CUT	
PGA Championship		

Did not play

CUT = missed the half-way cut

== Team appearances ==
Amateur

- European Youth's Team Championship (representing Sweden): 1984
- Eisenhower Trophy (representing Sweden): 1986, 1988
- St Andrews Trophy (representing Continent of Europe): 1986, 1988
- European Amateur Team Championship (representing Sweden): 1987
