= 1981 Ryder Cup =

Golf tournament held in England

24th Ryder Cup Matches
- Dates: 18–20 September 1981
- Venue: Walton Heath Golf Club
- Location: Surrey, England
- Captains: John Jacobs (Europe); Dave Marr (USA)
(Europe)	9 1/2	18 1/2	(United States)
- United States wins the Ryder Cup

Location map
- Location within England

The 24th Ryder Cup Matches were held 18–20 September 1981 at the Walton Heath Golf Club in Walton-on-the-Hill, Surrey, England, southwest of London. The United States team won the competition by a score of 18 1/2 to 9 1/2 points. It was the largest margin of defeat for a European team (since 1979) at the Ryder Cup until 2021. It is also the largest margin of defeat for the host team on European soil.

Seve Ballesteros was not selected for the European team after an ongoing dispute with the European Tour concerning appearance money. Tony Jacklin was also left off the team.

It was the sixth and final Ryder Cup for Jack Nicklaus as a competitor and he won all four of his matches. He had failed to make the team for the first time in 1979. Bernhard Langer made his Ryder Cup debut in 1981 and was 1–2 in pairs and halved his singles match.

== Format ==
The Ryder Cup is a match play event, with each match worth one point. The competition format was adjusted slightly from the 1979 event, with the order of play swapped on the first two days and the third day singles matches held in a single session:

- Day 1 — 4 foursome (alternate shot) matches in a morning session and 4 four-ball (better ball) matches in an afternoon session
- Day 2 — 4 four-ball matches in a morning session and 4 foursome matches in an afternoon session
- Day 3 — 12 singles matches

With a total of 28 points, 14 1/2 points were required to win the Cup. All matches were played to a maximum of 18 holes.

== Teams ==
Ten of the European team were selected using a points list based on money earned in European Tour Events. The final event was the Benson & Hedges International Open which finished on 24 August. Eamonn Darcy finished in a tie for second place in this tournament, lifting him from 12th to 7th in the list and relegating Mark James to 11th place. The two remaining places were chosen immediately after the Benson & Hedges International by a selection committee consisting of John Jacobs (the captain), Neil Coles and Bernhard Langer. They chose Mark James and Peter Oosterhuis, who was playing on the PGA Tour and had recently won the Canadian Open.

Team Europe
Name	Age	Points rank	Previous Ryder Cups	Matches	W–L–H	Winning percentage
(England) John Jacobs	56	Non-playing captain
(West Germany) Bernhard Langer	24	1	0	Rookie
(England) Nick Faldo	24	2	2	7	6–1–0	85.71
(Scotland) Sandy Lyle	23	3	1	4	1–2–1	37.50
(Spain) José María Cañizares	34	4	0	Rookie
(Scotland) Sam Torrance	28	5	0	Rookie
(Spain) Manuel Piñero	29	6	0	Rookie
(Republic of Ireland) Eamonn Darcy	29	7	2	7	0–5–2	14.29
(Republic of Ireland) Des Smyth	28	8	1	2	0–2–0	0.00
(England) Howard Clark	27	9	1	1	0–1–0	0.00
(Scotland) Bernard Gallacher	32	10	6	25	12–9–4	56.00
(England) Mark James	27	11	2	5	0–4–1	10.00
(England) Peter Oosterhuis	33	–	5	25	14–8–3	62.00

Players chosen by the selection committee are shown in yellow.

11 of the American team were selected from a points list. Qualification based on the points list finished after the Western Open on July 5. Bill Rogers earned his place by finishing 5th in this final event, while Jack Nicklaus only assured his place in the team after a final round 69 and a tie for 7th place. The final place in the team was allocated to the winner of the 1981 PGA Championship (which finished on August 9), provided he was not in the top 11, in which case the 12th player in the points list would qualify (Howard Twitty). With his victory in the PGA Championship, Larry Nelson gained the last slot. Nelson had finished 17th in the points list. The team is considered to be one of the strongest ever seen in the Ryder Cup - the players had won a total of 36 major championships.

Team USA
Name	Age	Points rank	Previous Ryder Cups	Matches	W–L–H	Winning percentage
Dave Marr	47	Non-playing captain
Tom Watson	32	1	1	3	2–1–0	66.67
Raymond Floyd	39	2	3	10	2–5–3	35.00
Bruce Lietzke	30	3	0	Rookie
Tom Kite	31	4	1	4	3–1–0	75.00
Hale Irwin	36	5	3	12	9–2–1	79.17
Lee Trevino	41	6	5	26	13–7–6	61.54
Jerry Pate	28	7	0	Rookie
Ben Crenshaw	29	8	0	Rookie
Johnny Miller	34	9	1	4	2–1–1	62.50
Bill Rogers	30	10	0	Rookie
Jack Nicklaus	41	11	5	24	13–8–3	60.42
Larry Nelson	34	17	1	5	5–0–0	100.00

Nelson qualified by virtue of winning the 1981 PGA Championship.

== Friday's matches ==
18 September 1981

=== Morning foursomes ===
	Results
Langer/Piñero	(United States) 1 up	Trevino/Nelson
Lyle/James	(Europe) 2 & 1	Rogers/Lietzke
Gallacher/Smyth	(Europe) 3 & 2	Irwin/Floyd
Oosterhuis/Faldo	(United States) 4 & 3	Watson/Nicklaus
2	Session	2
2	Overall	2

=== Afternoon four-ball ===
	Results
Torrance/Clark	halved	Kite/Miller
Lyle/James	(Europe) 3 & 2	Crenshaw/Pate
Smyth/Cañizares	(Europe) 6 & 5	Rogers/Lietzke
Gallacher/Darcy	(United States) 2 & 1	Irwin/Floyd
2 1/2	Session	1 1/2
4 1/2	Overall	3 1/2

== Saturday's matches ==
19 September 1981

=== Morning four-ball ===
	Results
Faldo/Torrance	(United States) 7 & 5	Trevino/Pate
Lyle/James	(United States) 1 up	Nelson/Kite
Langer/Piñero	(Europe) 2 & 1	Floyd/Irwin
Cañizares/Smyth	(United States) 3 & 2	Nicklaus/Watson
1	Session	3
5 1/2	Overall	6 1/2

=== Afternoon foursomes ===
	Results
Oosterhuis/Torrance	(United States) 2 & 1	Trevino/Pate
Langer/Piñero	(United States) 3 & 2	Nicklaus/Watson
Lyle/James	(United States) 3 & 2	Rogers/Floyd
Smyth/Gallacher	(United States) 3 & 2	Kite/Nelson
0	Session	4
5 1/2	Overall	10 1/2

== Sunday's singles matches ==
20 September 1981

	Results
Sam Torrance	(United States) 5 & 3	Lee Trevino
Sandy Lyle	(United States) 3 & 2	Tom Kite
Bernard Gallacher	halved	Bill Rogers
Mark James	(United States) 2 up	Larry Nelson
Des Smyth	(United States) 6 & 4	Ben Crenshaw
Bernhard Langer	halved	Bruce Lietzke
Manuel Piñero	(Europe) 4 & 2	Jerry Pate
José María Cañizares	(United States) 1 up	Hale Irwin
Nick Faldo	(Europe) 2 & 1	Johnny Miller
Howard Clark	(Europe) 4 & 3	Tom Watson
Peter Oosterhuis	(United States) 1 up	Raymond Floyd
Eamonn Darcy	(United States) 5 & 3	Jack Nicklaus
4	Session	8
9 1/2	Overall	18 1/2

== Individual player records ==
Each entry refers to the win–loss–half record of the player.

=== Europe ===
Player	Points	Overall	Singles	Foursomes	Fourballs
José María Cañizares	1	1–2–0	0–1–0	0–0–0	1–1–0
Howard Clark	1.5	1–0–1	1–0–0	0–0–0	0–0–1
Eamonn Darcy	0	0–2–0	0–1–0	0–0–0	0–1–0
Nick Faldo	1	1–2–0	1–0–0	0–1–0	0–1–0
Bernard Gallacher	1.5	1–2–1	0–0–1	1–1–0	0–1–0
Mark James	2	2–3–0	0–1–0	1–1–0	1–1–0
Bernhard Langer	1.5	1–2–1	0–0–1	0–2–0	1–0–0
Sandy Lyle	2	2–3–0	0–1–0	1–1–0	1–1–0
Peter Oosterhuis	0	0–3–0	0–1–0	0–2–0	0–0–0
Manuel Piñero	2	2–2–0	1–0–0	0–2–0	1–0–0
Des Smyth	2	2–3–0	0–1–0	1–1–0	1–1–0
Sam Torrance	0.5	0–3–1	0–1–0	0–1–0	0–1–1

=== United States ===
Player	Points	Overall	Singles	Foursomes	Fourballs
Ben Crenshaw	1	1–1–0	1–0–0	0–0–0	0–1–0
Raymond Floyd	3	3–2–0	1–0–0	1–1–0	1–1–0
Hale Irwin	2	2–2–0	1–0–0	0–1–0	1–1–0
Tom Kite	3.5	3–0–1	1–0–0	1–0–0	1–0–1
Bruce Lietzke	0.5	0–2–1	0–0–1	0–1–0	0–1–0
Johnny Miller	0.5	0–1–1	0–1–0	0–0–0	0–0–1
Larry Nelson	4	4–0–0	1–0–0	2–0–0	1–0–0
Jack Nicklaus	4	4–0–0	1–0–0	2–0–0	1–0–0
Jerry Pate	2	2–2–0	0–1–0	1–0–0	1–1–0
Bill Rogers	1.5	1–2–1	0–0–1	1–1–0	0–1–0
Lee Trevino	4	4–0–0	1–0–0	2–0–0	1–0–0
Tom Watson	3	3–1–0	0–1–0	2–0–0	1–0–0

== Video ==
- 2012 Ryder Cup Ryder Cup Flashback: 1981
- 1981 Ryder Cup British broadcast
