= 2000 Senior PGA Tour =

Golf tour season

2000 Senior PGA Tour season
- Duration: January 21, 2000 – November 5, 2000
- Number of official events: 40
- Most wins: (United States) Larry Nelson (6)
- Money list: (United States) Larry Nelson
- Player of the Year: (United States) Larry Nelson
- Rookie of the Year: (United States) Doug Tewell

The 2000 Senior PGA Tour was the 21st season of the Senior PGA Tour, the main professional golf tour in the United States for men aged 50 and over.

== Schedule ==
The following table lists official events during the 2000 season.

Date	Tournament	Location	Purse (US$)	Winner (Note: The number in parentheses after each winner's name is the number of Senior PGA Tour events they had won up to and including that tournament. This information is only shown for Senior PGA Tour members.)	Notes
Jan 23	MasterCard Championship	Hawaii	1,200,000	(United States) George Archer (19)	
Feb 6	Royal Caribbean Classic	Florida	1,100,000	(United States) Bruce Fleisher (8)	
Feb 13	ACE Group Classic	Florida	1,200,000	(United States) Lanny Wadkins (1)	
Feb 20	GTE Classic	Florida	1,300,000	(United States) Bruce Fleisher (9)	
Feb 27	LiquidGolf.com Invitational	Florida	1,200,000	(United States) Tom Wargo (5)	
Mar 5	Toshiba Senior Classic	California	1,300,000	(United States) Allen Doyle (5)	
Mar 12	Audi Senior Classic	Mexico	1,500,000	(United States) Hubert Green (2)	New tournament
Mar 26	Emerald Coast Classic	Florida	1,250,000	(United States) Gil Morgan (16)	
Apr 2	The Countrywide Tradition	Arizona	1,600,000	(United States) Tom Kite (1)	Senior PGA Tour major championship
Apr 16	PGA Seniors' Championship	Florida	1,800,000	(United States) Doug Tewell (1)	Senior major championship
Apr 23	Las Vegas Senior Classic	Nevada	1,400,000	(United States) Larry Nelson (6)	
Apr 30	Bruno's Memorial Classic	Alabama	1,300,000	(United States) John Jacobs (3)	
May 7	Home Depot Invitational	North Carolina	1,300,000	(United States) Bruce Fleisher (10)	
May 14	Nationwide Championship	Georgia	1,450,000	(United States) Hale Irwin (26)	
May 21	TD Waterhouse Championship	Missouri	1,300,000	(United States) Dana Quigley (4)	
May 28	Boone Valley Classic	Missouri	1,500,000	(United States) Larry Nelson (7)	
Jun 4	BellSouth Senior Classic	Tennessee	1,500,000	(United States) Hale Irwin (27)	
Jun 11	SBC Senior Open	Illinois	1,400,000	(United States) Tom Kite (2)	
Jun 18	SBC Championship	Texas	1,100,000	(United States) Doug Tewell (2)	
Jun 25	Cadillac NFL Golf Classic	New Jersey	1,100,000	(United States) Lee Trevino (29)	
Jul 2	U.S. Senior Open	Pennsylvania	2,250,000	(United States) Hale Irwin (28)	Senior major championship
Jul 9	State Farm Senior Classic	Maryland	1,350,000	(United States) Leonard Thompson (2)	
Jul 16	Ford Senior Players Championship	Michigan	2,300,000	(United States) Raymond Floyd (14)	Senior PGA Tour major championship
Jul 23	Instinet Classic	New Jersey	1,400,000	(United States) Gil Morgan (17)	
Jul 30	Senior British Open	Northern Ireland	£400,000	(Republic of Ireland) Christy O'Connor Jnr (4)	Senior major championship (Note: Unofficial money event at the time, but retrospectively counted as an official win.)
Jul 30	Lightpath Long Island Classic	New York	1,500,000	(United States) Bruce Fleisher (11)	
Aug 6	Coldwell Banker Burnet Classic	Minnesota	1,600,000	(United States) Ed Dougherty (1)	
Aug 13	AT&T Canada Senior Open Championship	Canada	1,450,000	(United States) Tom Jenkins (2)	
Aug 20	Novell Utah Showdown	Utah	1,450,000	(United States) Doug Tewell (3)	
Aug 27	FleetBoston Classic	Massachusetts	1,300,000	(United States) Larry Nelson (8)	
Sep 3	Foremost Insurance Championship	Michigan	1,100,000	(United States) Larry Nelson (9)	
Sep 10	Comfort Classic	Indiana	1,250,000	(United States) Gil Morgan (18)	
Sep 17	Kroger Senior Classic	Ohio	1,400,000	(United States) Hubert Green (3)	
Sep 24	Bank One Senior Championship	Texas	1,400,000	(United States) Larry Nelson (10)	
Oct 1	Vantage Championship	North Carolina	1,500,000	(United States) Larry Nelson (11)	
Oct 8	The Transamerica	California	1,100,000	(United States) Jim Thorpe (1)	
Oct 15	Gold Rush Classic	California	1,100,000	(United States) Jim Thorpe (2)	
Oct 22	EMC Kaanapali Classic	Hawaii	1,100,000	(United States) Hale Irwin (29)	
Oct 29	SBC Senior Classic	California	1,400,000	(United States) Joe Inman (3)	
Nov 5	IR Senior Tour Championship	South Carolina	2,100,000	(United States) Tom Watson (2)	Tour Championship

=== Unofficial events ===
The following events were sanctioned by the Senior PGA Tour, but did not carry official money, nor were wins official.

Date	Tournament	Location	Purse ($)	Winners	Notes
Dec 10	Office Depot Father/Son Challenge	Florida	860,000	(United States) Raymond Floyd and son Robert Floyd	Team event

== Money list ==
The money list was based on prize money won during the season, calculated in U.S. dollars.

Position	Player	Prize money ($)
1	(United States) Larry Nelson	2,708,005
2	(United States) Bruce Fleisher	2,373,977
3	(United States) Hale Irwin	2,128,968
4	(United States) Gil Morgan	1,873,216
5	(United States) Dana Quigley	1,802,063

== Awards ==
Award	Winner	Ref.
Player of the Year (Jack Nicklaus Trophy)	(United States) Larry Nelson	
Rookie of the Year	(United States) Doug Tewell	
Scoring leader (Byron Nelson Award)	(United States) Gil Morgan	
Comeback Player of the Year	(United States) Raymond Floyd	
