= 1987 Ryder Cup =

27th edition; golf tournament in Ohio, U.S.

27th Ryder Cup Matches
- Dates: September 25–27, 1987
- Venue: Muirfield Village Golf Club
- Location: Dublin, Ohio
- Captains: Jack Nicklaus (USA); Tony Jacklin (Europe)
(United States)	13	15	(Europe)
- Europe wins the Ryder Cup

Location map
- Location within Ohio

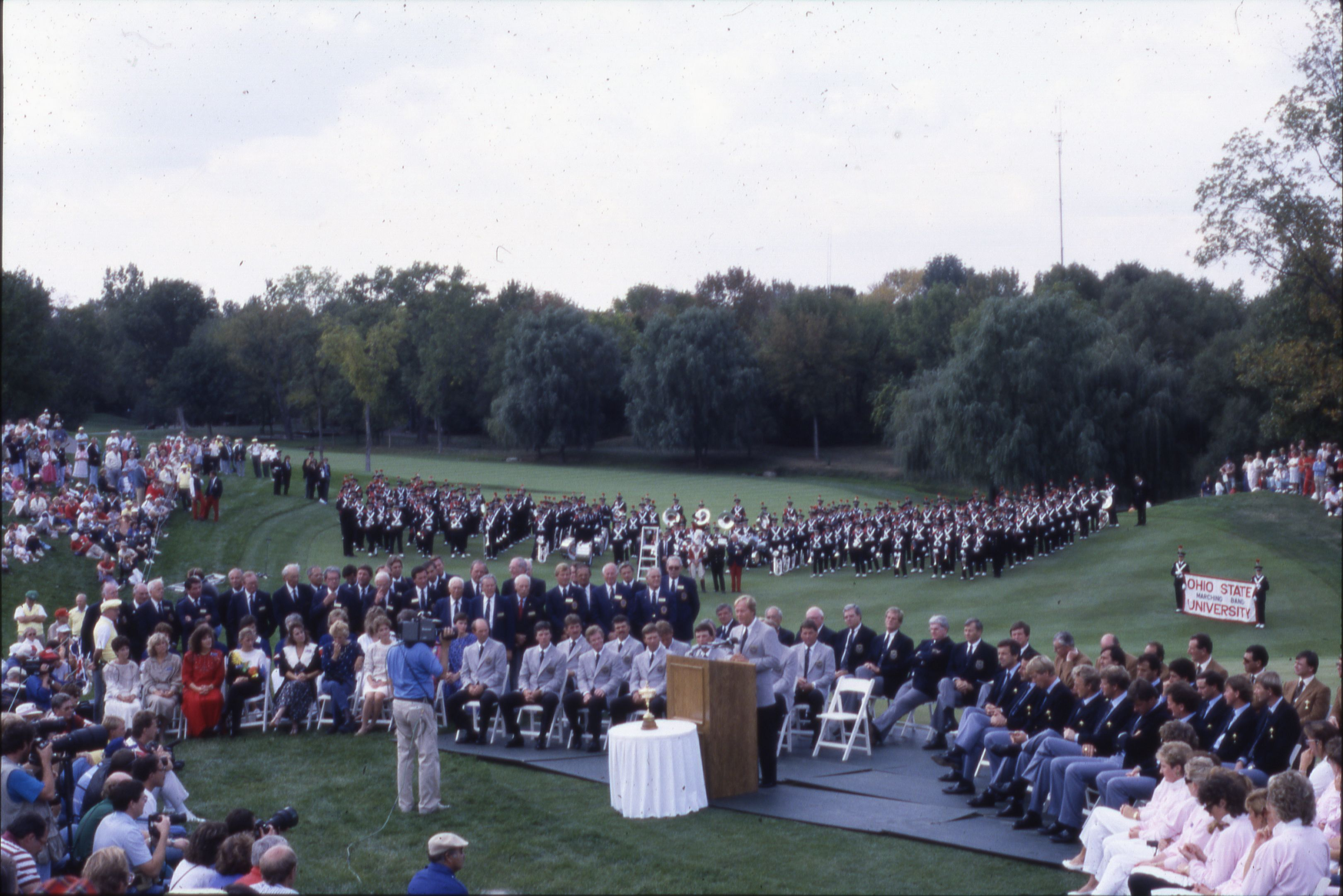
Opening ceremonies

The 27th Ryder Cup Matches were held September 25–27, 1987 at Muirfield Village Golf Club in Dublin, Ohio, a suburb north of Columbus. The European team won their second consecutive competition by a score of 15 to 13 points in probably the most historic Ryder Cup. After an unbeaten record of 13–0 spanning sixty years, the U.S. team lost for the first time on home soil.

Europe took a lead of 5 points into the Sunday singles matches, but the U.S. fought back strongly to narrow the deficit. Eamonn Darcy, who previously had a very poor Ryder Cup record, defeated Ben Crenshaw at the last hole to get Europe to 13 points. Crenshaw had broken his putter in a moment of frustration after the sixth hole and putted with his 1 iron for the last dozen holes. Bernhard Langer then halved his match with Larry Nelson and when Seve Ballesteros defeated Curtis Strange 2 & 1 to total 14 1/2 points, the European victory was secured.

This was the last Ryder Cup in which the U.S. team did not employ captain's selections. Europe used captain's picks in 1979, 1981, 1985, and this year.

Muirfield Village, founded and designed by U.S. captain Jack Nicklaus, has hosted the Memorial Tournament on the PGA Tour since 1976. The 2013 Presidents Cup was held at the same course.

== Format ==
The Ryder Cup is a match play event, with each match worth one point. The competition format in 1987 adjusted slightly from the previous three events, with the order of play on the second day swapped:

- Day 1 (Friday) — 4 foursome (alternate shot) matches in a morning session and 4 four-ball (better ball) matches in an afternoon session
- Day 2 (Saturday) — 4 foursome matches in a morning session and 4 four-ball matches in an afternoon session
- Day 3 (Sunday) — 12 singles matches

With a total of 28 points, 14 1/2 points were required to win the Cup. All matches were played to a maximum of 18 holes.

== Teams ==
Team USA
Name	Age	Points rank	World ranking	Previous Ryder Cups	Matches	W–L–H	Winning percentage
Jack Nicklaus	47	Non-playing captain
Scott Simpson	32	–	13	0	Rookie
Larry Nelson	40	–	28	2	9	9–0–0	100.00
Payne Stewart	30	1	5	0	Rookie
Ben Crenshaw	35	2	11	2	6	3–2–1	58.33
Curtis Strange	32	3	4	2	7	3–3–1	50.00
Hal Sutton	29	4	21	1	4	1–2–1	37.50
Larry Mize	29	5	15	0	Rookie
Lanny Wadkins	37	6	9	4	17	12–4–1	73.53
Dan Pohl	32	7	25	0	Rookie
Tom Kite	37	8	17	4	15	8–4–3	63.33
Mark Calcavecchia	27	9	32	0	Rookie
Andy Bean	34	10	36	1	3	2–1–0	66.67

Simpson qualified by virtue of winning the 1987 U.S. Open, while Nelson qualified by winning the 1987 PGA Championship.

The selection process for the European team remained unchanged from 1985, with nine players chosen from the 1987 European Tour money list at the conclusion of the German Open on August 30 and the remaining three team members being chosen immediately afterwards by the team captain, Tony Jacklin. Prior to the final event Eamonn Darcy was in the 9th qualifying place with Mats Lanner in 10th. Lanner finished just one shot ahead of Darcy in the German Open and Darcy retained his qualifying place. Jacklin's choices were Ken Brown, Sandy Lyle and José María Olazábal.

Team Europe
Name	Age	Points rank	World ranking	Previous Ryder Cups	Matches	W–L–H	Winning percentage
(England) Tony Jacklin	43	Non-playing captain
(Wales) Ian Woosnam	29	1	12	2	7	2–4–1	35.71
(England) Nick Faldo	30	2	20	5	17	11–6–0	64.71
(England) Howard Clark	33	3	42	3	7	3–3–1	50.00
(Spain) Seve Ballesteros	30	4	2	3	15	6–6–3	50.00
(Scotland) Gordon Brand Jnr	29	5	40	0	Rookie
(Scotland) Sam Torrance	34	6	54	3	13	3–7–3	34.62
(West Germany) Bernhard Langer	30	7	3	3	14	7–4–3	60.71
(Spain) José Rivero	32	8	68=	1	2	1–1–0	50.00
(Republic of Ireland) Eamonn Darcy	35	9	112	3	9	0–7–2	11.11
(Spain) José María Olazábal	21	11	43	0	Rookie
(Scotland) Sandy Lyle	29		7	4	14	4–8–2	35.71
(Scotland) Ken Brown	30		77=	4	11	4–7–0	36.36

Captains picks are shown in yellow. The world rankings and records are at the start of the 1987 Ryder Cup.

== Friday's matches ==
=== Morning foursomes ===
	Results
Torrance/Clark	(United States) 4 & 2	Strange/Kite
Brown/Langer	(United States) 2 & 1	Sutton/Pohl
Faldo/Woosnam	(Europe) 2 up	Wadkins/Mize
Ballesteros/Olazábal	(Europe) 1 up	Nelson/Stewart
2	Session	2
2	Overall	2

=== Afternoon four-ball ===
	Results
Brand/Rivero	(Europe) 3 & 2	Crenshaw/Simpson
Lyle/Langer	(Europe) 1 up	Bean/Calcavecchia
Faldo/Woosnam	(Europe) 2 & 1	Sutton/Pohl
Ballesteros/Olazábal	(Europe) 2 & 1	Strange/Kite
4	Session	0
6	Overall	2

== Saturday's matches ==
=== Morning foursomes ===
	Results
Rivero/Brand	(United States) 3 & 1	Strange/Kite
Faldo/Woosnam	halved	Sutton/Mize
Lyle/Langer	(Europe) 2 & 1	Wadkins/Nelson
Ballesteros/Olazábal	(Europe) 1 up	Crenshaw/Stewart
2 1/2	Session	1 1/2
8 1/2	Overall	3 1/2

=== Afternoon four-ball ===
	Results
Faldo/Woosnam	(Europe) 5 & 4	Strange/Kite
Darcy/Brand	(United States) 3 & 2	Bean/Stewart
Ballesteros/Olazábal	(United States) 2 & 1	Sutton/Mize
Lyle/Langer	(Europe) 2 up	Wadkins/Nelson
2	Session	2
10 1/2	Overall	5 1/2

== Sunday's singles matches ==
	Results
Ian Woosnam	(United States) 1 up	Andy Bean
Howard Clark	(Europe) 1 up	Dan Pohl
Sam Torrance	halved	Larry Mize
Nick Faldo	(United States) 1 up	Mark Calcavecchia
José María Olazábal	(United States) 2 up	Payne Stewart
José Rivero	(United States) 2 & 1	Scott Simpson
Sandy Lyle	(United States) 3 & 2	Tom Kite
Eamonn Darcy	(Europe) 1 up	Ben Crenshaw
Bernhard Langer	halved	Larry Nelson
Seve Ballesteros	(Europe) 2 & 1	Curtis Strange
Ken Brown	(United States) 3 & 2	Lanny Wadkins
Gordon Brand Jnr	halved	Hal Sutton
4 1/2	Session	7 1/2
15	Overall	13

== Individual player records ==
Each entry refers to the win–loss–half record of the player.

=== United States ===
Player	Points	Overall	Singles	Foursomes	Fourballs
Andy Bean	2	2–1–0	1–0–0	0–0–0	1–1–0
Mark Calcavecchia	1	1–1–0	1–0–0	0–0–0	0–1–0
Ben Crenshaw	0	0–3–0	0–1–0	0–1–0	0–1–0
Tom Kite	3	3–2–0	1–0–0	2–0–0	0–2–0
Larry Mize	2	1–1–2	0–0–1	0–1–1	1–0–0
Larry Nelson	0.5	0–3–1	0–0–1	0–2–0	0–1–0
Dan Pohl	1	1–2–0	0–1–0	1–0–0	0–1–0
Scott Simpson	1	1–1–0	1–0–0	0–0–0	0–1–0
Payne Stewart	2	2–2–0	1–0–0	0–2–0	1–0–0
Curtis Strange	2	2–3–0	0–1–0	2–0–0	0–2–0
Hal Sutton	3	2–1–2	0–0–1	1–0–1	1–1–0
Lanny Wadkins	1	1–3–0	1–0–0	0–2–0	0–1–0

=== Europe ===
Player	Points	Overall	Singles	Foursomes	Fourballs
Seve Ballesteros	4	4–1–0	1–0–0	2–0–0	1–1–0
Gordon Brand Jnr	1.5	1–2–1	0–0–1	0–1–0	1–1–0
Ken Brown	0	0–2–0	0–1–0	0–1–0	0–0–0
Howard Clark	1	1–1–0	1–0–0	0–1–0	0–0–0
Eamonn Darcy	1	1–1–0	1–0–0	0–0–0	0–1–0
Nick Faldo	3.5	3–1–1	0–1–0	1–0–1	2–0–0
Bernhard Langer	3.5	3–1–1	0–0–1	1–1–0	2–0–0
Sandy Lyle	3	3–1–0	0–1–0	1–0–0	2–0–0
José María Olazábal	3	3–2–0	0–1–0	2–0–0	1–1–0
José Rivero	1	1–2–0	0–1–0	0–1–0	1–0–0
Sam Torrance	0.5	0–1–1	0–0–1	0–1–0	0–0–0
Ian Woosnam	3.5	3–1–1	0–1–0	1–0–1	2–0–0
