= 1981 PGA Championship =

Tournament information
- Dates: August 6–9, 1981
- Location: Duluth, Georgia; 34.004°N 84.193°W
- Courses: Atlanta Athletic Club, Highlands Course
- Organized by: PGA of America
- Tour: PGA Tour

Statistics
- Par: 70
- Length: 7,070 yards (6,465 m)
- Field: 147 players, 78 after cut
- Cut: 147 (+7)
- Prize fund: $401,050
- Winner's share: $60,000

Champion
- (United States) Larry Nelson
- 273 (−7)

Location map
- Location in the United States Location in Georgia

The 1981 PGA Championship was the 63rd PGA Championship, held August 6–9 at Atlanta Athletic Club in Duluth, Georgia, a suburb northeast of Atlanta. Larry Nelson won the first of his three major titles, four strokes ahead of runner-up Fuzzy Zoeller.

Lee Trevino, 1974 champion, did not sign his scorecard after an opening round 74 and was disqualified after turning himself in. Bob Murphy led after each of the first two rounds, but was 8-over on the weekend and finished ten strokes back in 18th place. After a second consecutive 66 on Saturday, Nelson held the 54-hole lead, four strokes ahead of Zoeller

Tom Watson was the PGA Tour money list leader in August 1981, but missed the cut by a stroke.

It was the second major held at the Highlands Course, which hosted the U.S. Open in 1976. The PGA Championship returned in 2001 and 2011.

== Course layout ==
Hole	1	2	3	4	5	6	7	8	9	Out	10	11	12	13	14	15	16	17	18	In	Total
Yards	456	458	469	210	546	445	185	422	419	3,610	374	470	510	390	415	215	410	213	463	3,460	7,070
Par	4	4	4	3	5	4	3	4	4	35	4	4	5	4	4	3	4	3	4	35	70

== Round summaries ==
=== First round ===
Thursday, August 6, 1981

Place	Player	Score	To par
1	(United States) Bob Murphy	66	−4
T2	(United States) Bob Eastwood	67	−3
T2	(United States) Mark Lye	67	−3
T4	(United States) Rex Caldwell	68	−2
T4	(United States) Vance Heafner	68	−2
T4	(United States) Andy North	68	−2
T7	(United States) Charles Coody	69	−1
T7	(United States) Lon Hinkle	69	−1
T7	(United States) Roger Maltbie	69	−1
T7	(United States) Dan Pohl	69	−1
T7	(United States) Ron Streck	69	−1

=== Second round ===
Friday, August 7, 1981

Place	Player	Score	To par
1	(United States) Bob Murphy	66-69=135	−5
T2	(United States) Bob Eastwood	67-69=136	−4
T2	(United States) Larry Nelson	70-66=136	−4
T2	(United States) Dan Pohl	69-67=136	−4
5	(United States) Andy North	69-68=137	−3
T6	(United States) Vance Heafner	68-70=138	−2
T6	(United States) Tom Kite	71-67=138	−2
T6	(United States) Fuzzy Zoeller	70-68=138	−2
T9	(United States) Gil Morgan	70-69=139	−1
T9	(United States) Jack Nicklaus	71-68=139	−1
T9	(United States) Jerry Pate	71-68=139	−1

=== Third round ===
Saturday, August 8, 1981

Place	Player	Score	To par
1	(United States) Larry Nelson	70-66-66=202	−8
2	(United States) Fuzzy Zoeller	70-68-68=206	−4
T3	(United States) Tom Kite	71-67-69=207	−3
T3	(United States) Andy North	69-68-70=207	−3
T5	(United States) Bob Eastwood	67-69-72=208	−2
T5	(United States) Vance Heafner	68-70-70=208	−2
T5	(United States) Bob Murphy	66-69-73=208	−2
T5	(Australia) Greg Norman	73-67-68=208	−2
T9	(Japan) Isao Aoki	75-68-66=209	−1
T9	(United States) Jerry Pate	71-68-70=209	−1
T9	(United States) Dan Pohl	69-67-73=209	−1

=== Final round ===
Sunday, August 9, 1981

Place	Player	Score	To par	Money ($)
1	(United States) Larry Nelson	70-66-66-71=273	−7	60,000
2	(United States) Fuzzy Zoeller	70-68-68-71=277	−3	40,000
3	(United States) Dan Pohl	69-67-73-69=278	−2	25,000
T4	(Japan) Isao Aoki	75-68-66-70=279	−1	13,146
T4	(United States) Keith Fergus	71-71-69-68=279	−1	13,146
T4	(United States) Bob Gilder	74-69-70-66=279	−1	13,146
T4	(United States) Tom Kite	71-67-69-72=279	−1	13,146
T4	(United States) Bruce Lietzke	70-70-71-68=279	−1	13,146
T4	(United States) Jack Nicklaus	71-68-71-69=279	−1	13,146
T4	(Australia) Greg Norman	73-67-68-71=279	−1	13,146
