= Bank One Senior Championship =

The Bank One Senior Championship was a golf tournament on the Champions Tour in 1999 and 2000. It was played in Dallas, Texas at the Bent Tree Country Club.

The purse for the 2000 tournament was US$1,400,000, with $210,000 going to the winner.

== Winners ==
Bank One Senior Championship

- 2000 Larry Nelson

Bank One Championship

- 1999 Tom Watson
