= Larry Nelson =

American professional golfer (born 1947)

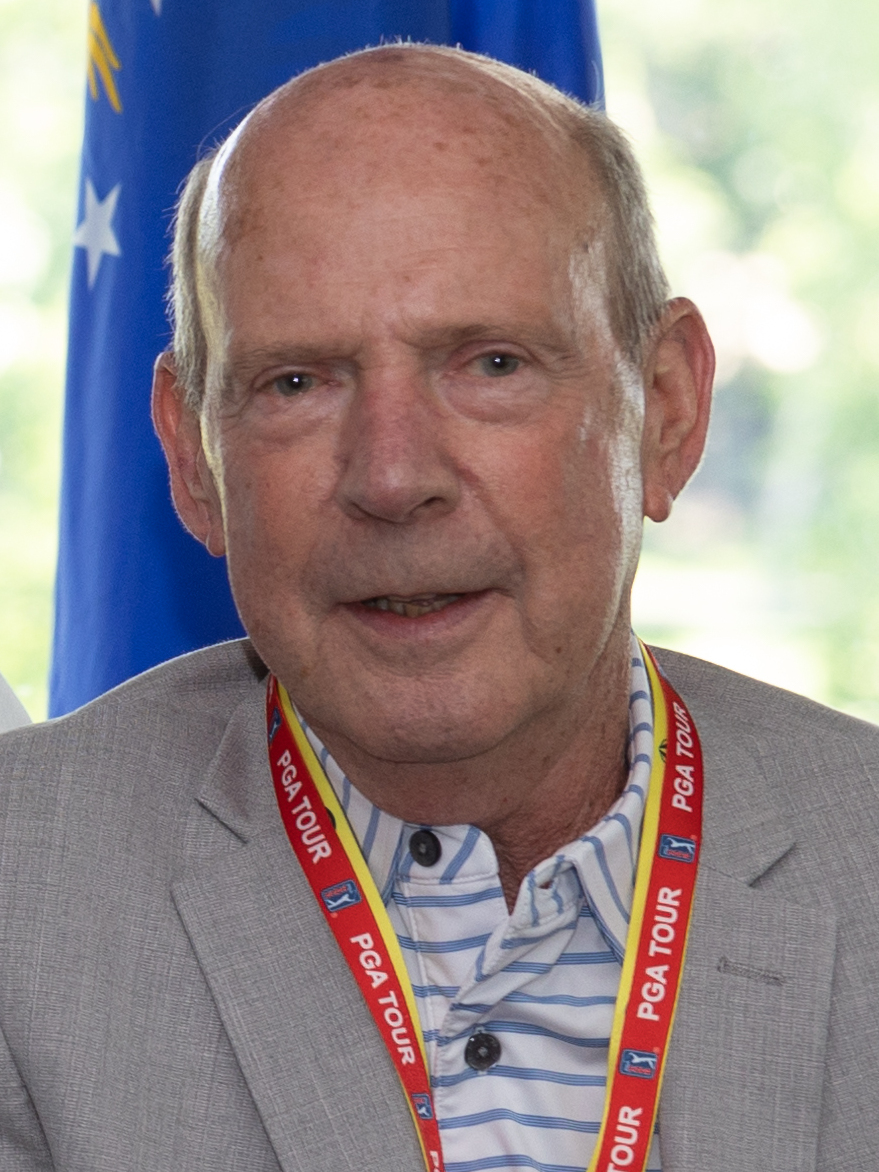
- Nelson in 2023

Personal information
- Full name: Larry Gene Nelson
- Nationality: United States
- Born: September 10, 1947 (age 79) Fort Payne, Alabama, U.S.
- Height: 5 ft 9 in (1.75 m)
- Weight: 150 lb (68 kg; 11 st)

Career
- Sport: Golf
- College: Kennesaw Junior College
- Turned professional: 1971
- Current tour: Champions Tour
- Former tour: PGA Tour
- Professional wins: 41
- Highest ranking: 12 (July 17, 1988)

Number of wins by tour
- PGA Tour: 10
- European Tour: 3
- Japan Golf Tour: 4
- PGA Tour Champions: 19
- Other: 8

Best results in major championships (wins: 3)
- Masters Tournament: 5th: 1984
- PGA Championship: Won: 1981, 1987
- U.S. Open: Won: 1983
- The Open Championship: T12: 1980

Achievements and awards
- World Golf Hall of Fame: 2006 (member page)
- Senior PGA Tour money list winner: 2000
- Senior PGA Tour Player of the Year: 2000

Larry Gene Nelson (born September 10, 1947) is an American professional golfer. He has won numerous tournaments at both the PGA Tour and Champions Tour level.

== Early life and amateur career ==
Nelson was born in Fort Payne, Alabama and grew up in Acworth, Georgia, northwest of Atlanta. He did not play the game growing up – atypical for a successful professional golfer – focusing on basketball and baseball.

Nelson took up golf at the age of 21, after he returned from serving in the infantry in Vietnam (Nelson was a 20-year-old newlywed when he was drafted into the U.S. Army). Nelson was first introduced to golf by Ken Hummel, a soldier and friend in his infantry unit, and Nelson carefully studied Ben Hogan's book The Five Fundamentals of Golf while learning how to play the game. He soon discovered that he had a talent for the game, breaking 100 the first time he played and 70 within nine months. Nelson went on to graduate from Kennesaw Junior College in 1970.

== Professional career ==
In 1971, Nelson turned professional. He qualified for the PGA Tour at 1973 PGA Tour Qualifying School. Nelson's breakthrough year came in 1979 when he won twice and finished second on the money list to Tom Watson.

Nelson won 10 times on the PGA Tour including three major championships. He earned his first major title at the 1981 PGA Championship which he won by four strokes over Fuzzy Zoeller. In 1983, Nelson was victorious at the U.S. Open at Oakmont coming from seven behind at the halfway point to defeat Tom Watson by a single shot. Nelson scored a U.S. Open record 65-67 over the last 36 holes at the difficult Oakmont course which broke a 51-year Open record established by Gene Sarazen. His 10-under-par 132 record score has yet to be equaled. In 1987, he finished tied with Lanny Wadkins after the regulation 72 holes of the PGA Championship. He won the title with a par at the first playoff hole.

Nelson played on the U.S. Ryder Cup team in 1979, 1981, and 1987. His record of 9–3–1 is one of the best since the event became USA v Europe in 1979; it had been a perfect 9–0–0 after the first two events.

Nelson also had great success internationally. He won four tournaments on the Japan Golf Tour. Nelson also finished runner-up at the 1982 Dunlop Phoenix Tournament, 1985 Suntory Open, and the 1987 Mitsui Sumitomo Visa Taiheiyo Masters in Japan. In addition, in 1987 he finished runner-up at the New Zealand Open on the PGA Tour of Australia. He lost to Northern Ireland's Ronan Rafferty in a sudden-death playoff.

Since turning 50 in 1997, Nelson has had a successful Champions Tour career, winning 19 times.

Nelson is also active in golf course design and created the LagRx Swing Trainer to help golfers condition and improve their muscle memory.

== Honors ==
Nelson was inducted into the World Golf Hall of Fame in October 2006.

In 2011, Nelson received the PGA Distinguished Service Award from the PGA of America. The award "honors outstanding individuals who display leadership and humanitarian qualities, including integrity, sportsmanship and enthusiasm for the game of golf".

== Professional wins (41) ==
=== PGA Tour wins (10) ===
Legend
Major championships (3)
Other PGA Tour (7)

No.	Date	Tournament	Winning score	Margin of victory	Runner(s)-up
1	Mar 11, 1979	Jackie Gleason-Inverrary Classic	−14 (67-69-67-71=274)	3 strokes	(United States) Grier Jones
2	Jul 8, 1979	Western Open	−2 (71-69-70-76=286)	Playoff	(United States) Ben Crenshaw
3	Jun 8, 1980	Atlanta Classic	−18 (66-69-68-67=270)	7 strokes	(United States) Andy Bean, (United States) Don Pooley
4	Apr 5, 1981	Greater Greensboro Open	−7 (69-68-69-75=281)	Playoff	(United States) Mark Hayes
5	Aug 9, 1981	PGA Championship	−7 (70-66-66-71=273)	4 strokes	(United States) Fuzzy Zoeller
6	Jun 19, 1983	U.S. Open	−4 (75-73-65-67=280)	1 stroke	(United States) Tom Watson
7	Oct 21, 1984	Walt Disney World/Oldsmobile Classic	−22 (66-66-64-70=266)	1 stroke	(United States) Hubert Green
8	Aug 9, 1987	PGA Championship (2)	−1 (70-72-73-72=287)	Playoff	(United States) Lanny Wadkins
9	Oct 18, 1987	Walt Disney World/Oldsmobile Classic (2)	−20 (68-69-68-63=268)	1 stroke	(United States) Morris Hatalsky, (United States) Mark O'Meara
10	Jun 26, 1988	Georgia-Pacific Atlanta Golf Classic (2)	−20 (63-66-66-73=268)	1 stroke	(United States) Chip Beck

PGA Tour playoff record (3–2)

No.	Year	Tournament	Opponent	Result
1	1979	Danny Thomas Memphis Classic	(United States) Gil Morgan	Lost to birdie on second extra hole
2	1979	Western Open	(United States) Ben Crenshaw	Won with birdie on first extra hole
3	1981	Greater Greensboro Open	(United States) Mark Hayes	Won with birdie on second extra hole
4	1987	PGA Championship	(United States) Lanny Wadkins	Won with par on first extra hole
5	1989	GTE Byron Nelson Classic	(United States) Jodie Mudd	Lost to birdie on first extra hole

=== PGA of Japan Tour wins (4) ===
No.	Date	Tournament	Winning score	Margin of victory	Runner(s)-up
1	Oct 12, 1980	Tokai Classic	−14 (72-69-66-67=274)	1 stroke	(Japan) Yutaka Hagawa
2	Apr 24, 1983	Dunlop International Open^{1}	−12 (67-65-69=201) (Note: Shortened to 54 holes due to weather.)	1 stroke	(Japan) Masahiro Kuramoto
3	Sep 10, 1989	Suntory Open	−12 (69-67-70-70=276)	Playoff	(Japan) Saburo Fujiki
4	Nov 24, 1991	Dunlop Phoenix Tournament	−12 (70-71-67-68=276)	Playoff	(Japan) Isao Aoki, (Spain) Seve Ballesteros, (United States) Jay Don Blake

^{1}Co-sanctioned by the Asia Golf Circuit

PGA of Japan Tour playoff record (2–1)

No.	Year	Tournament	Opponent(s)	Result
1	1985	Suntory Open	(Japan) Tateo Ozaki	Lost to par on second extra hole
2	1989	Suntory Open	(Japan) Saburo Fujiki	Won with birdie on first extra hole
3	1991	Dunlop Phoenix Tournament	(Japan) Isao Aoki, (Spain) Seve Ballesteros, (United States) Jay Don Blake	Won with par on fourth extra hole Ballesteros eliminated by birdie on third hole Blake eliminated by par on first hole

=== Other wins (2) ===
- 1978 Georgia Open
- 1988 PGA Grand Slam of Golf (United States - unofficial event)

=== Champions Tour wins (19) ===
No.	Date	Tournament	Winning score	Margin of victory	Runner(s)-up
1	Feb 22, 1998	American Express Invitational	−13 (63-69-71=203)	4 strokes	(United States) Dave Stockton
2	May 31, 1998	Pittsburgh Senior Classic	−12 (65-65-74=204)	5 strokes	(United States) Bob Duval
3	Sep 27, 1998	Boone Valley Classic	−16 (70-65-65=200)	2 strokes	(Australia) Graham Marsh
4	Feb 21, 1999	GTE Classic	−8 (70-68-67=205)	2 strokes	(United States) Bruce Fleisher
5	May 2, 1999	Bruno's Memorial Classic	−11 (70-67-68=205)	1 stroke	(United States) Dana Quigley
6	Apr 23, 2000	Las Vegas Senior Classic	−19 (67-66-64=197)	5 strokes	(United States) Bruce Fleisher (United States) Hale Irwin
7	May 28, 2000	Boone Valley Classic (2)	−16 (66-66-68=200)	3 strokes	(United States) Tom Watson
8	Aug 27, 2000	FleetBoston Classic	−13 (67-70-66=203)	4 strokes	(United States) Jim Thorpe
9	Sep 3, 2000	Foremost Insurance Championship	−18 (66-69-63=198)	3 strokes	(United States) Dave Stockton
10	Sep 24, 2000	Bank One Senior Championship	−13 (67-68-68=203)	6 strokes	(United States) Bill Brask, (United States) Jim Thorpe
11	Oct 1, 2000	Vantage Championship	−12 (66-63-69=198)	Playoff	(United States) Jim Dent, (United States) Gil Morgan
12	Jan 24, 2001	MasterCard Championship	−19 (67-64-66=197)	1 stroke	(United States) Jim Thorpe
13	Feb 8, 2001	Royal Caribbean Classic	29 pts (6-15-8=29)	1 point	(Argentina) Vicente Fernández
14	Jun 24, 2001	FleetBoston Classic (2)	−15 (65-69-67=201)	3 strokes	(United States) Bruce Fleisher
15	Jul 8, 2001	Farmers Charity Classic (2)	−14 (67-67-68=202)	1 stroke	(United States) Jim Ahern
16	Oct 21, 2001	SBC Championship	−17 (67-69-63=199)	2 strokes	(United States) Bob Gilder, (United States) Gary McCord
17	Sep 14, 2003	Constellation Energy Classic	−9 (67-70-70=207)	2 strokes	(United States) Jim Dent, (United States) Doug Tewell
18	May 9, 2004	FedEx Kinko's Classic	−7 (73-69-67=209)	1 stroke	(United States) Bruce Lietzke
19	Oct 10, 2004	Administaff Small Business Classic	−14 (68-70-64=202)	Playoff	(United States) Hale Irwin

Champions Tour playoff record (2–3)

No.	Year	Tournament	Opponent(s)	Result
1	1998	Cadillac NFL Golf Classic	(United States) Jim Colbert, (United States) Bob Dickson	Dickson won with birdie on first extra hole
2	1998	Kroger Senior Classic	(South Africa) Hugh Baiocchi, (New Zealand) Bob Charles (United States) Frank Conner, (United States) Bruce Summerhays	Baiocchi won with birdie on second extra hole
3	2000	The Countrywide Tradition	(United States) Tom Kite, (United States) Tom Watson	Kite won with birdie on sixth extra hole Nelson eliminated by par on second hole
4	2000	Vantage Championship	(United States) Jim Dent, (United States) Gil Morgan	Nelson won with birdie on sixth extra hole Dent eliminated by birdie on first hole
5	2004	Administaff Small Business Classic	(United States) Hale Irwin	Won with birdie on first extra hole

=== Other senior wins (6) ===
- 1999 Chrysler Senior Match Play Challenge
- 2004 Office Depot Father/Son Challenge (with son Drew)
- 2007 Del Webb Father/Son Challenge (with son Josh)
- 2008 Del Webb Father/Son Challenge (with son Drew)
- 2015 Bass Pro Shops Legends of Golf (Legends division, with Bruce Fleisher)
- 2016 Bass Pro Shops Legends of Golf (Legends division, with Bruce Fleisher)

== Playoff record ==
PGA Tour of Australasia playoff record (0–1)

No.	Year	Tournament	Opponent	Result
1	1987	Nissan-Mobil New Zealand Open	(Northern Ireland) Ronan Rafferty	Lost to par on seventh extra hole

== Major championships ==
=== Wins (3) ===
Year	Championship	54 holes	Winning score	Margin	Runner-up
1981	PGA Championship	4 shot lead	−7 (70-66-66-71=273)	4 strokes	(United States) Fuzzy Zoeller
1983	U.S. Open	1 shot deficit	−4 (75-73-65-67=280)	1 stroke	(United States) Tom Watson
1987	PGA Championship (2)	3 shot deficit	−1 (70-72-73-72=287)	Playoff^{1}	(United States) Lanny Wadkins

^{1}Defeated Wadkins with a par on the first extra hole.

=== Results timeline ===
Tournament	1976	1977	1978	1979
Masters Tournament				T31
U.S. Open	T21	T54	CUT	T4
The Open Championship				
PGA Championship	T34	T54	T12	T28

Tournament	1980	1981	1982	1983	1984	1985	1986	1987	1988	1989
Masters Tournament	T6	CUT	T7	CUT	5	T36	T36	CUT	T33	CUT
U.S. Open	T60	T20	T19	1	CUT	T39	T35	CUT	T62	T13
The Open Championship	T12		T32	T53	CUT	T56	CUT	T48	T13	CUT
PGA Championship	CUT	1	CUT	T36	CUT	T23	CUT	1	T38	T46

Tournament	1990	1991	1992	1993	1994	1995	1996	1997	1998	1999
Masters Tournament	48	55	DQ							
U.S. Open	T14	T3	CUT	T46	CUT			CUT		
The Open Championship										
PGA Championship	CUT	CUT	T28	T56	CUT	CUT	WD	T71		CUT

Tournament	2000	2001	2002	2003	2004	2005	2006	2007	2008	2009
Masters Tournament										
U.S. Open										
The Open Championship										
PGA Championship		CUT	CUT				CUT			

Tournament	2010	2011
Masters Tournament		
U.S. Open		
The Open Championship		
PGA Championship		CUT

Win
Top 10
Did not play

CUT = missed the halfway cut (3rd round cut in 1984 Open Championship)
DQ = disqualified
WD = withdrew
"T" indicates a tie for a place.

=== Summary ===
Tournament	Wins	2nd	3rd	Top-5	Top-10	Top-25	Events	Cuts made
Masters Tournament	0	0	0	1	3	3	14	9
U.S. Open	1	0	1	3	3	8	20	14
The Open Championship	0	0	0	0	0	2	9	6
PGA Championship	2	0	0	2	2	4	27	13
Totals	3	0	1	6	8	17	70	42

- Most consecutive cuts made – 7 (1978 PGA – 1980 Open Championship)
- Longest streak of top-10s – 2 (1981 PGA – 1982 Masters)

== Results in The Players Championship ==
Tournament	1974	1975	1976	1977	1978	1979	1980	1981	1982	1983	1984	1985	1986	1987	1988	1989
The Players Championship	CUT	T72	T39	T8	T4	T20	DQ	CUT	T10	CUT	T62	CUT	CUT	CUT	CUT	T59

Tournament	1990	1991	1992	1993	1994	1995	1996	1997	1998
The Players Championship	T16	T23	CUT	CUT	T55	CUT	T62	CUT	CUT

Top 10

CUT = missed the halfway cut
DQ = disqualified
"T" indicates a tie for a place

== U.S. national team appearances ==
- Ryder Cup: 1979 (winners), 1981 (winners), 1987
- UBS Warburg Cup: 2001 (winners)
- Wendy's 3-Tour Challenge (representing Senior PGA Tour): 1997, 1998 (winners)

== See also ==
- 1973 PGA Tour Qualifying School graduates
- List of golfers with most Champions Tour wins
