= Doug Tewell =

American professional golfer (born 1949)

Personal information
- Full name: Douglas Fred Tewell
- Nationality: United States
- Born: August 27, 1949 (age 77) Baton Rouge, Louisiana, U.S.
- Height: 5 ft 10 in (1.78 m)
- Weight: 210 lb (95 kg; 15 st)

Career
- Sport: Golf
- College: Oklahoma State University
- Turned professional: 1971
- Former tours: PGA Tour; Champions Tour
- Professional wins: 16

Number of wins by tour
- PGA Tour: 4
- PGA Tour Champions: 8
- Other: 4

Best results in major championships
- Masters Tournament: T14: 1988
- PGA Championship: T9: 1983
- U.S. Open: T41: 1986
- The Open Championship: DNP

Achievements and awards
- Senior PGA Tour Rookie of the Year: 2000

Douglas Fred Tewell (born August 27, 1949) is an American professional golfer who has won several tournaments at both the PGA Tour and Champions Tour level, including two senior major championships.

== Early life and amateur career ==
Tewell was born in Baton Rouge, Louisiana. He grew up in Stillwater, Oklahoma. He got started in the game by working as a caddie for his father. He attended Oklahoma State University in his hometown on a basketball scholarship his freshman year, but later switched to golf. Tewell graduated in 1971.

== Professional career ==
Shortly after graduating college, in 1971, Tewell turned pro. Tewell joined the PGA Tour in 1975; his best year came in 1980 when he won the Sea Pines Heritage and IVB-Golf Classic. He won two more times on the Tour in the mid-1980s. His best finishes in a major were T-9 at the 1983 PGA Championship and T-10 at the 1986 PGA Championship. Tewell was forced off the PGA Tour at the age of 46 at the end of the 1995 season due to an orthopedic problem in his left elbow. He had arthroscopic surgery on the same elbow in 2005, a procedure he describes as "cleaning out scar tissue".

The biggest win in his career was his first on the Champions Tour. He won his first major, the Senior PGA Championship at the PGA National Resort & Spa in Palm Beach Gardens, Florida by seven shots over four other players including Tom Kite and Hale Irwin.

== Personal life ==
Tewell lives today in Edmond, Oklahoma with his wife Pam. They have a daughter, Kristie, and a son, Jay. Kristie is married to former Nationwide Tour player Pat Bates.

== Professional wins (16) ==
=== PGA Tour wins (4) ===
No.	Date	Tournament	Winning score	Margin of victory	Runner(s)-up
1	Mar 30, 1980	Sea Pines Heritage	−4 (69-66-72-73=280)	Playoff	(United States) Jerry Pate
2	Aug 3, 1980	IVB-Golf Classic	−12 (67-73-65-67=272)	1 stroke	(United States) Tom Kite
3	Feb 23, 1986	Los Angeles Open	−14 (69-72-66-63=270)	7 strokes	(United States) Clarence Rose
4	Oct 11, 1987	Pensacola Open	−15 (69-66-66-68=269)	3 strokes	(United States) Phil Blackmar, (United States) Danny Edwards

PGA Tour playoff record (1–0)

No.	Year	Tournament	Opponent	Result
1	1980	Sea Pines Heritage	(United States) Jerry Pate	Won with par on first extra hole

=== Other wins (4) ===
- 1978 South Central PGA Championship
- 1982 Oklahoma Open
- 1988 Acom Team Championship (with Bob Gilder)
- 1995 Jerry Ford Invitational

=== Champions Tour wins (8) ===
Legend
Champions Tour major championships (2)
Other Champions Tour (6)

No.	Date	Tournament	Winning score	Margin of victory	Runner(s)-up
1	Apr 16, 2000	PGA Seniors' Championship	−15 (68-66-67=201) (Note: Shortened to 54 holes due to weather.)	7 strokes	(United States) Hale Irwin, (United States) Tom Kite, (United States) Larry Nelson, (United States) Dana Quigley
2	Jun 18, 2000	SBC Championship	−14 (70-65-67=202)	1 stroke	(United States) Walter Hall, (United States) Larry Nelson
3	Aug 20, 2000	Novell Utah Showdown	−17 (67-66-66=199)	2 strokes	(United States) Gil Morgan
4	Apr 15, 2001	The Countrywide Tradition	−23 (66-67-70-62=265)	9 strokes	(United States) Mike McCullough
5	Feb 17, 2002	Verizon Classic	−13 (67-67-69=203)	1 stroke	(United States) Hale Irwin
6	Apr 7, 2002	Liberty Mutual Legends of Golf	−11 (69-66-70=205)	1 stroke	(United States) Bobby Wadkins
7	Jun 22, 2003	Farmers Charity Classic	−15 (69-66-66=201)	Playoff	(Republic of Ireland) Eamonn Darcy
8	Aug 22, 2004	Greater Hickory Classic at Rock Barn	−14 (69-69-64=202)	1 stroke	(United States) Bruce Fleisher

Champions Tour playoff record (1–1)

No.	Year	Tournament	Opponent	Result
1	2001	Ford Senior Players Championship	(United States) Allen Doyle	Lost to par on first extra hole
2	2003	Farmers Charity Classic	(Republic of Ireland) Eamonn Darcy	Won with birdie on third extra hole

== Results in major championships ==
Tournament	1979	1980	1981	1982	1983	1984	1985	1986	1987	1988	1989	1990	1991
Masters Tournament		T38	CUT					CUT	CUT	T14	CUT		
U.S. Open			CUT	66		CUT		T41	CUT				
PGA Championship	CUT	T30	55	T22	T9	T25	T12	10	CUT	70	T53		T32

Note: Tewell never played in The Open Championship

Top 10
Did not play

CUT = missed the half-way cut
"T" = tied

== Results in The Players Championship ==
Tournament	1978	1979	1980	1981	1982	1983	1984	1985	1986	1987	1988	1989	1990	1991	1992	1993	1994	1995
The Players Championship	CUT		CUT	CUT	T56	T6	CUT	11	T10	CUT	T36	T34	WD	CUT	T21	T20	CUT	CUT

Top 10
Did not play

CUT = missed the halfway cut
WD = withdrew
"T" indicates a tie for a place

== Champions Tour major championships ==
=== Wins (2) ===
Year	Championship	Winning score	Margin	Runner(s)-up
2000	PGA Seniors' Championship	−15 (68-66-67=201)	7 strokes	(United States) Hale Irwin, (United States) Tom Kite, (United States) Larry Nelson, (United States) Dana Quigley
2001	The Countrywide Tradition	−23 (66-67-70-62=265)	9 strokes	(United States) Mike McCullough
