= Dan Pohl =

American professional golfer (born 1955)

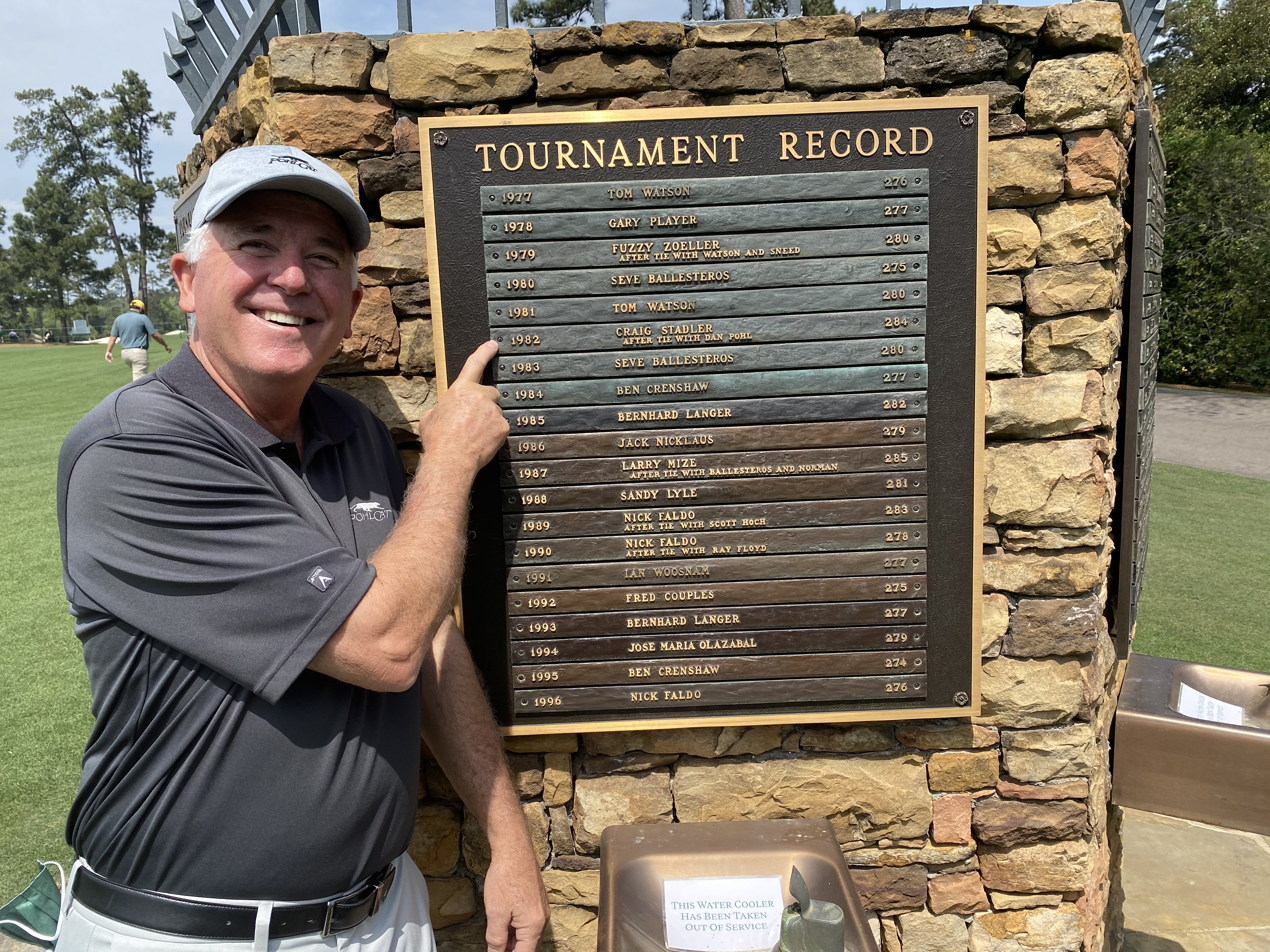
- Pohl in 2021

Personal information
- Full name: Danny Joe Pohl
- Nickname: Pohlcat
- Nationality: United States
- Born: April 1, 1955 (age 71) Mount Pleasant, Michigan, U.S.
- Height: 5 ft 11 in (1.80 m)
- Weight: 175 lb (79 kg; 12.5 st)

Career
- Sport: Golf
- College: University of Arizona
- Turned professional: 1977
- Former tours: PGA Tour; Champions Tour
- Professional wins: 3

Number of wins by tour
- PGA Tour: 2

Best results in major championships
- Masters Tournament: 2nd: 1982
- PGA Championship: 3rd: 1981
- U.S. Open: T3: 1982
- The Open Championship: CUT: 1986

Achievements and awards
- Vardon Trophy: 1987

Danny Joe Pohl (born April 1, 1955) is an American professional golfer. Pohl played on the PGA Tour and the Champions Tour. He won two PGA Tour tournaments, both in 1986: the Colonial and the World Series of Golf. However, Pohl may be best known for finishing in second place at the 1982 Masters Tournament, losing to Craig Stadler in a playoff. Pohl also qualified for the 1987 Ryder Cup representing the American team.

== Early life ==
Born and raised in Mt. Pleasant, Michigan. He is considered the greatest athlete produced by Mt. Pleasant High School, where he has been inducted into its Athletic Hall of Fame, earning All State honors in three sports (golf, baseball and basketball). As a prep baseball player, Pohl was scouted by Major League teams. He was a star point guard on a prep basketball team that went undefeated (20-0) during his senior season.

== Amateur career ==
Pohl attended the University of Arizona and played for the Wildcats' golf team. Pohl twice won the Michigan Amateur Golf Championship in 1975 and 1977.

== Professional career ==
Pohl turned pro in 1977 and joined the PGA Tour in 1978. Early in his career, Pohl was one of the top drivers on tour leading the tour in driving distance in 1980 and 1981. During this era, Pohl had much success at the major tournaments. He had a third-place finish at the 1981 PGA Championship. This qualified him for the 1982 Masters Tournament. Pohl finished the tournament tied with Craig Stadler at the end of regulation. Stadler defeated him in the playoff. A few months later he recorded a T-3 at the 1982 U.S. Open.

He won two tournaments on the PGA Tour during his career both of which came in 1986: the Colonial National Invitation and the NEC World Series of Golf. Pohl finished fifth on the money list that year. Pohl had 70 top-10 finishes including more than a dozen second or third-place finishes. A highly ranked player in the world, his career was still ascending in 1987 when he posted the lowest scoring average on the PGA Tour and won the Vardon Trophy. The following year, Pohl began to suffer a series of injuries starting with lower back surgery that dramatically altered his competitiveness. He was a member of the 1987 Ryder Cup Team.

Since turning 50 in April 2005, Pohl has played on the Champions Tour. His best finish at this level has been a T-3 at the 2005 Commerce Bank Long Island Classic.

== Awards and honors ==
- In 1985, Pohl was inducted into Arizona Sports Hall of Fame
- In 1987, he won the PGA Tour's Vardon Trophy
- In 2004, he was inducted into the Michigan Golf Hall of Fame

== Amateur wins ==
- 1975 Michigan Amateur
- 1977 Michigan Amateur

== Professional wins (3) ==
=== PGA Tour wins (2) ===
No.	Date	Tournament	Winning score	Margin of victory	Runner-up
1	May 18, 1986	Colonial National Invitation	−5 (68-69-68=205) (Note: Shortened to 54 holes due to weather.)	Playoff	(United States) Payne Stewart
2	Aug 24, 1986	NEC World Series of Golf	−10 (69-66-71-71=277)	1 stroke	(United States) Lanny Wadkins

PGA Tour playoff record (1–2)

No.	Year	Tournament	Opponent(s)	Result
1	1982	Masters Tournament	(United States) Craig Stadler	Lost to par on first extra hole
2	1985	Canon Sammy Davis Jr.-Greater Hartford Open	(United States) Phil Blackmar, (United States) Jodie Mudd	Blackmar won with birdie on first extra hole
3	1986	Colonial National Invitation	(United States) Payne Stewart	Won with birdie on first extra hole

=== Other wins (1) ===
- 1988 Pebble Beach National Pro-Am Championship (with Dan Marino)

== Results in major championships ==
Tournament	1980	1981	1982	1983	1984	1985	1986	1987	1988	1989
Masters Tournament			2	T8	T35		T31	CUT	T16	42
U.S. Open	CUT		T3	CUT		CUT	CUT	T9	T12	T29
The Open Championship							CUT			
PGA Championship		3	T70	8	T39	T12	T26	T14	8	T24

Top 10
Did not play

CUT = missed the half-way cut
"T" indicates a tie for a place

=== Summary ===
Tournament	Wins	2nd	3rd	Top-5	Top-10	Top-25	Events	Cuts made
Masters Tournament	0	1	0	1	2	3	7	6
U.S. Open	0	0	1	1	2	3	8	4
The Open Championship	0	0	0	0	0	0	1	0
PGA Championship	0	0	1	1	3	6	9	9
Totals	0	1	2	3	7	12	25	19

- Most consecutive cuts made – 8 (1987 U.S. Open – 1989 PGA)
- Longest streak of top-10s – 3 (1981 PGA – 1982 U.S. Open)

== Results in The Players Championship ==
Tournament	1980	1981	1982	1983	1984	1985	1986	1987	1988	1989	1990	1991	1992	1993	1994	1995	1996
The Players Championship	T8	T45	WD	CUT	T8	74	CUT	T7	T8	T50		CUT	T35	WD	CUT	T68	T62

Top 10
Did not play

CUT = missed the halfway cut
WD = withdrew
"T" indicates a tie for a place

== U.S. national team appearances ==
Professional

- Nissan Cup: 1986
- Ryder Cup: 1987

== See also ==
- Spring 1978 PGA Tour Qualifying School graduates
- Spring 1979 PGA Tour Qualifying School graduates
