= Don Pooley =

American professional golfer (born 1951)

Personal information
- Full name: Sheldon George Pooley Jr.
- Nickname: Don
- Nationality: United States
- Born: August 27, 1951 (age 75) Phoenix, Arizona, U.S.
- Height: 6 ft 3 in (1.91 m)
- Weight: 195 lb (88 kg; 13.9 st)

Career
- Sport: Golf
- College: University of Arizona
- Turned professional: 1973
- Current tour: Champions Tour
- Former tour: PGA Tour
- Professional wins: 7

Number of wins by tour
- PGA Tour: 2
- PGA Tour Champions: 2
- Other: 3

Best results in major championships
- Masters Tournament: T5: 1988
- PGA Championship: T5: 1987
- U.S. Open: T15: 1985
- The Open Championship: T16: 1988

Achievements and awards
- Byron Nelson Award: 1985
- Vardon Trophy: 1985
- Champions Tour Comeback Player of the Year: 2003

Sheldon George "Don" Pooley Jr. (born August 27, 1951) is an American professional golfer. He has won tournaments on both the PGA Tour and the Champions Tour.

== Early life and amateur career ==
Pooley was born in Phoenix, Arizona. He grew up in Riverside, California. He attended the University of Arizona in Tucson, where he was a member of the golf team.

== Professional career ==
Pooley turned pro in 1973. Despite winning the 1980 B.C. Open and the 1987 Memorial Tournament, Pooley is probably best remembered in his PGA Tour career for his dramatic million-dollar hole-in-one at the 1987 Bay Hill Classic. Pooley received $500,000 as did Arnold Palmer Hospital for Children and Women in Orlando, Florida because of this once-in-a-lifetime shot. In 1985, he won the Vardon Trophy, awarded annually by the PGA to the Tour leader in scoring average. His best finish in a major was T-5 in consecutive major championships: the 1987 PGA Championship and the 1988 Masters Tournament.

Late in his PGA Tour career, Pooley began to experience many debilitating ailments, and missed several years of playing time as a result; however, he enjoyed a resurgence in his career after turning 50 in August 2001 when he began play on the Champions Tour. The biggest win in his golf career was his first on the Champions Tour. In 2002, he won on the biggest stage in men's senior golf, the U.S. Senior Open. Pooley was inducted into the Pima County (Arizona) Sports Hall of Fame in 2006.

== Professional wins (7) ==
=== PGA Tour wins (2) ===
No.	Date	Tournament	Winning score	Margin of victory	Runner-up
1	Aug 31, 1980	B.C. Open	−17 (68-69-66-68=271)	1 stroke	(United States) Peter Jacobsen
2	May 31, 1987	Memorial Tournament	−16 (70-67-65-70=272)	3 strokes	(United States) Curt Byrum

=== Other wins (3) ===
- 1983 Jerry Ford Invitational (tie with Gil Morgan)
- 1989 Ebel Match Play
- 1992 Amoco Centel Championship

=== Champions Tour wins (2) ===
Legend
Senior major championships (1)
Other Champions Tour (1)

No.	Date	Tournament	Winning score	Margin of victory	Runner(s)-up
1	Jun 30, 2002	U.S. Senior Open	−10 (71-70-63-70=274)	Playoff	(United States) Tom Watson
2	Aug 24, 2003	Allianz Championship	−13 (66-67-67=200)	3 strokes	(United States) Bruce Fleisher, (United States) Bruce Lietzke, (United States) Jim Thorpe

Champions Tour playoff record (1–2)

No.	Year	Tournament	Opponent(s)	Result
1	2002	U.S. Senior Open	(United States) Tom Watson	Won with birdie on fifth extra hole after three-hole aggregate playoff; Pooley: E (4-4-4=12), Watson: E (4-4-4=12)
2	2005	Boeing Classic	(Republic of Ireland) Mark McNulty, (United States) Tom Purtzer	McNulty won with birdie on second extra hole
3	2009	AT&T Classic	(United States) Dan Forsman	Lost to birdie on first extra hole

== Results in major championships ==
Tournament	1977	1978	1979
Masters Tournament			
U.S. Open	CUT		
The Open Championship			
PGA Championship		CUT	

Tournament	1980	1981	1982	1983	1984	1985	1986	1987	1988	1989
Masters Tournament		T19	CUT				41	T45	T5	T14
U.S. Open		CUT	CUT			T15	T24	T24	CUT	T26
The Open Championship									T16	T19
PGA Championship	T46	T19	T67	T23	T34	T62	T16	T5	T58	T34

Tournament	1990	1991	1992	1993	1994	1995	1996	1997	1998	1999
Masters Tournament	T42	T46								
U.S. Open	CUT		T44						CUT	
The Open Championship	T39					T101				
PGA Championship	T8	T73				CUT		T29		

Tournament	2000	2001	2002	2003
Masters Tournament				
U.S. Open	CUT			CUT
The Open Championship				
PGA Championship				

Top 10
Did not play

CUT = missed the half-way cut
"T" indicates a tie for a place

=== Summary ===
Tournament	Wins	2nd	3rd	Top-5	Top-10	Top-25	Events	Cuts made
Masters Tournament	0	0	0	1	1	3	8	7
U.S. Open	0	0	0	0	0	3	13	5
The Open Championship	0	0	0	0	0	2	4	4
PGA Championship	0	0	0	1	2	5	15	13
Totals	0	0	0	2	3	13	40	29

- Most consecutive cuts made – 12 (1982 PGA – 1988 Masters)
- Longest streak of top-10s – 2 (1987 PGA – 1988 Masters)

== Champions Tour major championships ==
=== Wins (1) ===
Year	Championship	Winning score	Margin	Runner-up
2002	U.S. Senior Open	−10 (71-70-63-70=274)	Playoff^{1}	(United States) Tom Watson

^{1} In the three-hole aggregate playoff, Pooley and Watson tied with three pars each.
On the second sudden-death hole, Pooley won with a birdie to Watson's par.

=== Results timeline ===
Results not in chronological order before 2012.

Tournament	2002	2003	2004	2005	2006	2007	2008	2009	2010	2011	2012	2013
Senior PGA Championship	T18	CUT		T54	T57	WD	T6	T28	T23			
The Tradition	T9	T14	T53	T36	T9	T40	46	T8	T29	WD		T66
Senior Players Championship	T22	T40	T13	T18	T11	T23	T27	T34	T57			
U.S. Senior Open	1	T43	T15	T22	T51		T18	T47	T40			T47
Senior British Open Championship	–	T27	T5		T13			T8				

The Senior British Open was not a Champions Tour major until 2003.

Win
Top 10
Did not play

CUT = missed the halfway cut
WD = withdrew from tournament
"T" indicates a tie for a place

== See also ==
- Fall 1976 PGA Tour Qualifying School graduates
