= 1979 Tournament Players Championship =

Tournament information
- Dates: March 22–25, 1979
- Location: Ponte Vedra Beach, Florida; 30.189°N 81.370°W
- Courses: Sawgrass Country Club, East-West course
- Tour: PGA Tour

Statistics
- Par: 72
- Length: 7,083 yards (6,477 m)
- Field: 143 players, 71 after cut
- Cut: 147 (+3)
- Prize fund: $440,000
- Winner's share: $72,000

Champion
- (United States) Lanny Wadkins
- 283 (−5)

Location map
- Location in the United States Location in Florida

The 1979 Tournament Players Championship was a golf tournament in Florida on the PGA Tour, held March 22–25 at Sawgrass Country Club in Ponte Vedra Beach, southeast of Jacksonville. The sixth Tournament Players Championship, it was the third at Sawgrass and Lanny Wadkins won in the wind at 283 (−5), five strokes ahead of runner-up Tom Watson.

The first two years at Sawgrass had resulted with both winners at 289 (+1), but Wadkins jumped out to a 36-hole score of 135 (−9). Gusty winds and dry greens on the weekend caused high scores, but he held on with an even-par 72 in the final round for a comfortable win.

Defending champion Jack Nicklaus finished seventeen strokes back, in a tie for 33rd place.

== Venue ==
This was the third of five Tournament Players Championships held at Sawgrass Country Club; it moved to the nearby TPC at Sawgrass Stadium Course in 1982. The course length this year was reduced by 91 yards (83 m) to 7,083 yards (6,477 m).

== Eligibility requirements ==
1. All designated players

Miller Barber, Andy Bean (2), Ben Crenshaw (2), Lee Elder (2), Raymond Floyd, Rod Funseth (2), Al Geiberger, Lou Graham, Hubert Green (2), Mark Hayes, Jerry Heard (2), Dave Hill, Lon Hinkle (2), Hale Irwin, Don January, Tom Kite (2), Billy Kratzert, Bruce Lietzke, John Mahaffey (2), Jerry McGee, Mac McLendon (2), Johnny Miller, Gil Morgan (2), Jack Nicklaus (3), Andy North (2), Jerry Pate (2), Gary Player (2), Bill Rogers, Jim Simons (2), Ed Sneed, Dave Stockton, Lee Trevino (2), Lanny Wadkins, Tom Watson (2), Tom Weiskopf, Fuzzy Zoeller (2)

2. Winners of major PGA Tour co-sponsored or approved events beginning with the 1978 Tournament Players Championship and concluding with the tournament immediately preceding the 1979 TPC

Seve Ballesteros, Craig Stadler, Barry Jaeckel, Jeff Hewes, Jack Newton, Victor Regalado, Ron Streck

3. The current British Open champion

4. Leaders In PGA Tour Official Standings as necessary to complete the field, beginning with the 1978 Tournament Players Championship and concluding with the tournament scheduled to end on the Sunday immediately preceding the 1979 TPC, the Doral-Eastern Open

== Field ==
Tommy Aaron, Wally Armstrong, Seve Ballesteros, Miller Barber, Dave Barr, Andy Bean, Frank Beard, Don Bies, Homero Blancas, Brad Bryant, George Burns, Bob Byman, George Cadle, Rex Caldwell, Bill Calfee, Billy Casper, Jim Colbert, Bobby Cole, Frank Conner, Charles Coody, Ben Crenshaw, Rod Curl, Jim Dent, Terry Diehl, Dale Douglass, Bob Eastwood, Danny Edwards, David Edwards, Dave Eichelberger, Lee Elder, Randy Erskine, Keith Fergus, Ed Fiori, Marty Fleckman, Bruce Fleisher, Raymond Floyd, Rod Funseth, Buddy Gardner, Al Geiberger, Gibby Gilbert, Bob Gilder, David Graham, Lou Graham, Hubert Green, Jay Haas, Joe Hager, Dan Halldorson, Phil Hancock, Morris Hatalsky, Mark Hayes, Jerry Heard, Jeff Hewes, Dave Hill, Mike Hill, Lon Hinkle, Joe Inman, Hale Irwin, Don Iverson, Peter Jacobsen, Barry Jaeckel, Don January, Tom Kite, Gary Koch, Billy Kratzert, Wayne Levi, Bruce Lietzke, John Lister, Bob Lunn, Mark Lye, Bob Mann, Graham Marsh, Fred Marti, Rik Massengale, Gary McCord, Mike McCullough, Mark McCumber, Pat McGowan, Mac McLendon, Artie McNickle, Steve Melnyk, Lee Mikles, Allen Miller, Johnny Miller, Lindy Miller, Jeff Mitchell, Florentino Molina, Orville Moody, Gil Morgan, Mike Morley, Bob Murphy, Jim Nelford, Larry Nelson, Jack Newton, Jack Nicklaus, Andy North, Peter Oosterhuis, Arnold Palmer, Alan Pate, Jerry Pate, Eddie Pearce, Calvin Peete, Mark Pfeil, Gary Player, Don Pooley, Greg Powers, Tom Purtzer, Victor Regalado, Mike Reid, Jack Renner, Chi Chi Rodriguez, Bill Rogers, Ed Sabo, Cesar Sanudo, John Schroeder, Bob Shearer, Jim Simons, Scott Simpson, Tim Simpson, J. C. Snead, Ed Sneed, Craig Stadler, Dave Stockton, Curtis Strange, Ron Streck, Mike Sullivan, Alan Tapie, Barney Thompson, Leonard Thompson, Jim Thorpe, Lee Trevino, Howard Twitty, Bobby Wadkins, Lanny Wadkins, Bobby Walzel, Tom Watson, D. A. Weibring, Tom Weiskopf, Carlton White, Bob Wynn, Kermit Zarley, Bob Zender, Larry Ziegler, Fuzzy Zoeller

== Round summaries ==
=== First round ===
Thursday, March 22, 1979

Place	Player	Score	To par
1	(United States) Kermit Zarley	66	−6
T2	(United States) Jack Nicklaus	67	−5
T2	(United States) Andy North	67	−5
T2	(United States) Lanny Wadkins	67	−5
T5	(United States) Don January	68	−4
T5	(United States) Gil Morgan	68	−4
T5	(Canada) Jim Nelford	68	−4
T5	(United States) Ron Streck	68	−4
T9	(United States) Brad Bryant	69	−3
T9	(United States) Danny Edwards	69	−3
T9	(United States) Ed Fiori	69	−3
T9	(Canada) Dan Halldorson	69	−3
T9	(United States) Phil Hancock	69	−3
T9	(United States) Billy Kratzert	69	−3
T9	(United States) Wayne Levi	69	−3
T9	(United States) Lindy Miller	69	−3
T9	(Australia) Jack Newton	69	−3
T9	(United States) Jerry Pate	69	−3
T9	(United States) Tim Simpson	69	−3
T9	(United States) Dave Stockton	69	−3

=== Second round ===
Friday, March 23, 1979

Place	Player	Score	To par
1	(United States) Lanny Wadkins	67-68=135	−9
2	(United States) George Burns	72-66=138	−6
T3	(Canada) Dan Halldorson	69-70=139	−5
T3	(United States) Billy Kratzert	69-70=139	−5
T3	(United States) Lee Trevino	70-69=139	−5
T6	(United States) Ed Fiori	69-71=140	−4
T6	(United States) Mark McCumber	70-70=140	−4
T6	(United States) Jack Nicklaus	67-73=140	−4
T9	(United States) Wayne Levi	69-72=141	−3
T9	(United States) Andy North	67-74=141	−3
T9	(United States) Dave Stockton	69-72=141	−3

=== Third round ===
Saturday, March 24, 1979

Place	Player	Score	To par
1	(United States) Lanny Wadkins	67-68-76=211	−5
T2	(United States) George Burns	72-66-76=214	−2
T2	(United States) Billy Kratzert	69-70-75=214	−2
T2	(United States) Jack Renner	73-70-71=214	−2
T2	(United States) Lee Trevino	70-69-75=214	−2
6	(United States) Gary Koch	70-72-74=216	E
T5	(United States) Phil Hancock	69-73-75=217	+1
T5	(United States) Andy North	67-74-76=217	+1
T5	(Mexico) Victor Regalado	70-74-73=217	+1
T5	(United States) Tom Watson	70-72-75=217	+1

=== Final round ===
Sunday, March 25, 1979

Champion
(c) = past champion

Place	Player	Score	To par	Money ($)
1	(United States) Lanny Wadkins	67-68-76-72=283	−5	72,000
2	(United States) Tom Watson	70-72-75-71=288	E	43,200
3	(United States) Jack Renner	73-70-71-75=289	+1	27,200
4	(United States) Phil Hancock	69-73-75-74=291	+3	19,200
T5	(United States) Billy Kratzert	69-70-75-79=293	+5	14,600
T5	(United States) Wayne Levi	69-72-77-75=293	+5	14,600
T5	(United States) Lee Trevino	70-69-75-79=293	+5	14,600
8	(United States) Andy Bean	72-73-74-75=294	+6	12,400
T9	(United States) Jay Haas	71-74-74-76=295	+7	10,800
T9	(United States) Tom Kite	72-73-75-75=295	+7	10,800
T9	(Australia) Jack Newton	69-74-77-75=295	+7	10,800

Leaderboard below the top 10
Place	Player	Score	To par	Money ($)
T12	(United States) Mike McCullough	71-73-79-73=296	+8	8,800
T12	(United States) Gil Morgan	68-77-76-75=296	+8	8,800
T14	(United States) George Burns	72-66-76-83=297	+9	6,600
T14	(United States) Ed Fiori	69-71-79-78=297	+9	6,600
T14	(United States) Raymond Floyd	71-72-80-74=297	+9	6,600
T14	(United States) Peter Jacobsen	74-72-76-75=297	+9	6,600
T14	(Australia) Graham Marsh	72-75-75-75=297	+9	6,600
T14	(Mexico) Victor Regalado	70-74-73-80=297	+9	6,600
T20	(United States) Rex Caldwell	70-76-78-74=298	+10	4,035
T20	(United States) Hubert Green	73-72-78-75=298	+10	4,035
T20	(United States) Gary Koch	70-72-74-82=298	+10	4,035
T20	(United States) Larry Nelson	72-75-74-77=298	+10	4,035
T20	(United States) Andy North	67-74-76-81=298	+10	4,035
T20	(United States) Jerry Pate	69-73-77-79=298	+10	4,035
T20	(United States) Tim Simpson	69-73-80-76=298	+10	4,035
T20	(United States) Howard Twitty	75-67-76-80=298	+10	4,035
T28	(United States) Jim Colbert	73-72-76-78=299	+11	2,720
T28	(United States) Lindy Miller	69-76-77-77=299	+11	2,720
T28	(United States) John Schroeder	71-76-76-76=299	+11	2,720
T28	(United States) Alan Tapie	71-72-75-81=299	+11	2,720
T28	(United States) Jim Thorpe	72-73-77-77=299	+11	2,720
T33	(United States) Gibby Gilbert	71-75-78-76=300	+12	2,310
T33	(United States) Jack Nicklaus (c)	67-73-82-78=300	+12	2,310
T35	(United States) Bob Byman	70-74-75-82=301	+13	1,847
T35	(United States) Charles Coody	71-76-77-77=301	+13	1,847
T35	(United States) Marty Fleckman	72-74-79-76=301	+13	1,847
T35	(United States) Bruce Fleisher	73-72-78-78=301	+13	1,847
T35	(United States) Mark McCumber	70-70-80-81=301	+13	1,847
T35	(Canada) Jim Nelford	68-76-78-79=301	+13	1,847
T35	(United States) Mike Reid	71-73-78-79=301	+13	1,847
T35	(United States) Dave Stockton	69-72-79-81=301	+13	1,847
T43	(United States) Miller Barber	70-75-77-80=302	+14	1,248
T43	(South Africa) Bobby Cole	71-75-77-79=302	+14	1,248
T43	(United States) Lee Elder	70-76-78-78=302	+14	1,248
T43	(United States) Bob Gilder	72-74-81-75=302	+14	1,248
T43	(United States) Lou Graham	70-76-76-80=302	+14	1,248
T43	(United States) Orville Moody	73-73-77-79=302	+14	1,248
T43	(United States) Ron Streck	68-77-78-79=302	+14	1,248
T50	(United States) Randy Erskine	76-68-82-77=303	+15	950
T50	(Australia) David Graham	73-70-80-80=303	+15	950
T50	(United States) Morris Hatalsky	71-73-78-81=303	+15	950
T50	(United States) Mark Lye	71-76-79-77=303	+15	950
T50	(United States) Arnold Palmer	72-75-79-77=303	+15	950
T50	(United States) Cesar Sanudo	72-75-78-78=303	+15	950
T50	(United States) Jim Simons	71-73-76-83=303	+15	950
57	(United States) Don January	68-79-79-78=304	+16	904
T58	(United States) Allen Miller	72-75-80-78=305	+17	892
T58	(United States) Kermit Zarley	66-79-78-82=305	+17	892
T60	(United States) Bob Eastwood	72-74-76-84=306	+18	864
T60	(United States) Mark Hayes (c)	72-75-79-80=306	+18	864
T60	(United States) Gary McCord	72-74-81-79=306	+18	864
T60	(United States) Pat McGowan	73-74-79-80=306	+18	864
T60	(United States) Artie McNickle	73-73-85-75=306	+18	864
T65	(United States) Buddy Gardner	71-75-78-83=307	+19	836
T65	(United States) Barney Thompson	74-72-80-81=307	+19	836
T67	(United States) Al Geiberger (c)	71-75-80-82=308	+20	820
T67	(United States) Craig Stadler	72-73-81-82=308	+20	820
T69	(Canada) Dan Halldorson	69-70-81-89=309	+21	804
T69	(United States) Rik Massengale	71-76-78-84=309	+21	804
71	(United States) Bob Murphy	75-71-74-92=312	+24	792
CUT	(United States) Don Bies	70-78=148	+4	
CUT	(United States) Danny Edwards	69-79=148	+4	
CUT	(United States) David Edwards	74-74=148	+4	
CUT	(United States) Dave Eichelberger	71-77=148	+4	
CUT	(United States) Hale Irwin	71-77=148	+4	
CUT	(United States) Bruce Lietzke	73-75=148	+4	
CUT	(United States) Jeff Mitchell	73-75=148	+4	
CUT	(Argentina) Florentino Molina	71-77=148	+4	
CUT	(England) Peter Oosterhuis	74-74=148	+4	
CUT	(United States) Chi Chi Rodriguez	71-77=148	+4	
CUT	(United States) Curtis Strange	73-75=148	+4	
CUT	(United States) Leonard Thompson	72-76=148	+4	
CUT	(United States) Bobby Wadkins	74-74=148	+4	
CUT	(United States) Larry Ziegler	72-76=148	+4	
CUT	(United States) Wally Armstrong	72-77=149	+5	
CUT	(Canada) Dave Barr	73-76=149	+5	
CUT	(United States) Billy Casper	78-71=149	+5	
CUT	(United States) Ben Crenshaw	74-75=149	+5	
CUT	(United States) Rod Curl	75-74=149	+5	
CUT	(United States) Jim Dent	75-74=149	+5	
CUT	(United States) Keith Fergus	73-76=149	+5	
CUT	(United States) Rod Funseth	77-72=149	+5	
CUT	(United States) Mike Hill	75-74=149	+5	
CUT	(United States) Don Iverson	72-77=149	+5	
CUT	(United States) Bob Lunn	73-76=149	+5	
CUT	(United States) Mike Morley	75-74=149	+5	
CUT	(United States) Eddie Pearce	73-76=149	+5	
CUT	(United States) Scott Simpson	74-75=149	+5	
CUT	(United States) J. C. Snead	71-78=149	+5	
CUT	(United States) Brad Bryant	69-81=150	+6	
CUT	(United States) Fred Marti	71-79=150	+6	
CUT	(United States) Johnny Miller	74-76=150	+6	
CUT	(United States) Mark Pfeil	75-75=150	+6	
CUT	(United States) Greg Powers	70-80=150	+6	
CUT	(United States) Carlton White	72-78=150	+6	
CUT	(United States) Fuzzy Zoeller	73-77=150	+6	
CUT	(United States) Bill Calfee	73-78=151	+7	
CUT	(United States) Frank Conner	73-78=151	+7	
CUT	(United States) Joe Inman	73-78=151	+7	
CUT	(New Zealand) John Lister	73-78=151	+7	
CUT	(United States) Tom Purtzer	75-76=151	+7	
CUT	(United States) Bill Rogers	73-78=151	+7	
CUT	(United States) Terry Diehl	76-76=152	+8	
CUT	(United States) Mac McLendon	75-77=152	+8	
CUT	(United States) Steve Melnyk	77-75=152	+8	
CUT	(United States) Lee Mikles	78-74=152	+8	
CUT	(United States) Calvin Peete	74-78=152	+8	
CUT	(South Africa) Gary Player	73-79=152	+8	
CUT	(United States) Don Pooley	77-75=152	+8	
CUT	(United States) Ed Sneed	76-76=152	+8	
CUT	(United States) D. A. Weibring	73-79=152	+8	
CUT	(United States) Bob Mann	76-77=153	+9	
CUT	(United States) Bobby Walzel	72-81=153	+9	
CUT	(United States) Tommy Aaron	76-78=154	+10	
CUT	(United States) Homero Blancas	75-79=154	+10	
CUT	(United States) George Cadle	77-77=154	+10	
CUT	(United States) Barry Jaeckel	75-79=154	+10	
CUT	(United States) Mike Sullivan	76-78=154	+10	
CUT	(United States) Lon Hinkle	75-80=155	+11	
CUT	(United States) Tom Weiskopf	73-82=155	+11	
CUT	(United States) Joe Hager	75-81=156	+12	
CUT	(United States) Jerry Heard	79-77=156	+12	
CUT	(United States) Ed Sabo	75-81=156	+12	
CUT	(Spain) Seve Ballesteros	76-81=157	+13	
CUT	(United States) Dale Douglass	79-78=157	+13	
CUT	(Australia) Bob Shearer	75-82=157	+13	
CUT	(United States) Bob Zender	78-80=158	+14	
CUT	(United States) Frank Beard	82-77=159	+15	
CUT	(United States) Jeff Hewes	78-81=159	+15	
CUT	(United States) Dave Hill	79-80=159	+15	
CUT	(United States) Alan Pate	84-80=164	+20	
CUT	(United States) Bob Wynn	84-80=164	+20	
