= 1978 Tournament Players Championship =

Tournament information
- Dates: March 16–19, 1978
- Location: Ponte Vedra Beach, Florida; 30.189°N 81.370°W
- Courses: Sawgrass Country Club, East-West course
- Tour: PGA Tour

Statistics
- Par: 72
- Length: 7,174 yards (6,560 m)
- Field: 142 players, 79 after cut
- Cut: 153 (+9)
- Prize fund: $344,270
- Winner's share: $60,000

Champion
- (United States) Jack Nicklaus
- 289 (+1)

Location map
- Location in the United States Location in Florida

The 1978 Tournament Players Championship was a golf tournament in Florida on the PGA Tour, held March 16–19 at Sawgrass Country Club in Ponte Vedra Beach, southeast of Jacksonville. The fifth Tournament Players Championship, it was the second at Sawgrass and Jack Nicklaus won his third TPC title at 289 (+1), one stroke ahead of runner-up Lou Graham. Both shot 75 (+3) in the windy final round and Nicklaus went without a birdie.

This was the fourth consecutive start for Nicklaus in 1978 that ended with a top-two finish: two wins and two second places. Four months later in July, he won his third Open Championship to become the first to win the TPC and a major title in the same calendar year, later joined by Hal Sutton (1983, PGA), Tiger Woods (2001, Masters), and Martin Kaymer (2014, U.S. Open).

Defending champion Mark Hayes finished eleven strokes back, in a tie for 28th place.

== Venue ==
This was the second of five Tournament Players Championships held at Sawgrass Country Club; it moved to the nearby TPC at Sawgrass Stadium Course in 1982.

== Eligibility requirements ==
1. All designated players
2. Winners of major PGA Tour co-sponsored or approved events beginning with the 1977 Tournament Players Championship and concluding with the tournament immediately preceding the 1978 TPC
3. The current British Open champion
4. Leaders In PGA Tour Official Standings as necessary to complete the field, beginning with the 1977 Tournament Players Championship and concluding with the tournament scheduled to end on the Sunday immediately preceding the 1978 TPC, the Florida Citrus Open

== Field ==
Tommy Aaron, Sam Adams, Wally Armstrong, Butch Baird, Miller Barber, Andy Bean, Frank Beard, Don Bies, Homero Blancas, George Burns, George Cadle, Rex Caldwell, Bill Calfee, Billy Casper, Antonio Cerda Jr., Jim Colbert, Bobby Cole, Frank Conner, Charles Coody, Ben Crenshaw, Rod Curl, Jim Dent, Bruce Devlin, Terry Diehl, Ed Dougherty, Bob Eastwood, Danny Edwards, Dave Eichelberger, Lee Elder, Randy Erskine, Keith Fergus, Forrest Fezler, Raymond Floyd, Rod Funseth, Gibby Gilbert, Bob Gilder, David Graham, Lou Graham, Hubert Green, Gary Groh, Jay Haas, Phil Hancock, Morris Hatalsky, Dale Hayes, Mark Hayes, Jerry Heard, Mike Hill, Lon Hinkle, Joe Inman, Hale Irwin, Don Iverson, Peter Jacobsen, Barry Jaeckel, Don January, Tom Jenkins, Grier Jones, Tom Kite, George Knudson, Gary Koch, Billy Kratzert, Stan Lee, Wayne Levi, Bruce Lietzke, John Lister, Gene Littler, Lyn Lott, Mark Lye, John Mahaffey, Bill Mallon, Roger Maltbie, Graham Marsh, Fred Marti, Rik Massengale, Gary McCord, Mike McCullough, Jerry McGee, Mac McLendon, Artie McNickle, Steve Melnyk, Allen Miller, Johnny Miller, Jeff Mitchell, Florentino Molina, Orville Moody, Gil Morgan, Mike Morley, Bob Murphy, Larry Nelson, Dwight Nevil, Bobby Nichols, Jack Nicklaus, Andy North, Peter Oosterhuis, Arnold Palmer, Jerry Pate, Bob Payne, Eddie Pearce, Calvin Peete, Mark Pfeil, Gary Player, Don Pooley, Joe Porter, Tom Purtzer, Sammy Rachels, Victor Regalado, Mike Reid, Jack Renner, Chi Chi Rodriguez, Bill Rogers, John Schlee, John Schroeder, Tom Shaw, Bob Shearer, Dan Sikes, Jim Simons, Tim Simpson, Bob E. Smith, J. C. Snead, Ed Sneed, Craig Stadler, Ken Still, Dave Stockton, Curtis Strange, Ron Streck, Alan Tapie, Steve Taylor, Doug Tewell, Barney Thompson, Leonard Thompson, Lee Trevino, Howard Twitty, Bobby Wadkins, Lanny Wadkins, Art Wall Jr., Bobby Walzel, Tom Watson, Tom Weiskopf, Bob Wynn, Kermit Zarley, Bob Zender, Larry Ziegler, Fuzzy Zoeller

== Round summaries ==
=== First round ===
Thursday, March 16, 1978

Place	Player	Score	To par
T1	(United States) Ben Crenshaw	70	−2
T1	(United States) Gibby Gilbert	70	−2
T1	(United States) Gary Groh	70	−2
T1	(United States) Jack Nicklaus	70	−2
T1	(Mexico) Victor Regalado	70	−2
T1	(United States) John Schroeder	70	−2
T1	(United States) Bobby Wadkins	70	−2
T8	(United States) Lou Graham	71	−1
T8	(United States) Joe Inman	71	−1
T8	(United States) Artie McNickle	71	−1
T8	(United States) Larry Nelson	71	−1

=== Second round ===
Friday, March 17, 1978

Place	Player	Score	To par
T1	(United States) Ben Crenshaw	70-71=141	−3
T1	(United States) Lou Graham	71-70=141	−3
T1	(United States) Jack Nicklaus	70-71=141	−3
4	(United States) Larry Nelson	71-72=143	−1
5	(United States) John Mahaffey	72-72=144	E
T6	(United States) Mike Morley	72-73=145	+1
T6	(United States) Andy North	74-71=145	+1
T6	(United States) John Schroeder	70-75=145	+1
T9	(United States) Sam Adams	74-72=146	+2
T9	(Australia) David Graham	72-74=146	+2
T9	(United States) Joe Inman	71-75=146	+2
T9	(United States) Artie McNickle	71-75=146	+2
T9	(United States) Mac McLendon	72-74=146	+2
T9	(Argentina) Florentino Molina	72-74=146	+2
T9	(England) Peter Oosterhuis	73-73=146	+2

=== Third round ===
Saturday, March 18, 1978

Place	Player	Score	To par
1	(United States) Jack Nicklaus	70-71-73=214	−2
2	(United States) Lou Graham	71-70-74=215	−1
T3	(United States) Ben Crenshaw	70-71-77=218	+2
T3	(United States) Larry Nelson	71-72-75=218	+2
T5	(United States) John Mahaffey	72-72-75=219	+3
T5	(United States) Andy North	74-71-74=219	+3
T7	(United States) Lon Hinkle	75-72-74=221	+5
T7	(United States) Mike McCullough	77-75-69=221	+5
T7	(England) Peter Oosterhuis	73-73-75=221	+5
T7	(United States) John Schroeder	70-75-76=221	+5
T7	(United States) Bob Shearer	74-75-72=221	+5
T7	(United States) Bob Zender	75-73-73=221	+5

=== Final round ===
Sunday, March 19, 1978

Champion
(c) = past champion

Place	Player	Score	To par	Money ($)
1	(United States) Jack Nicklaus (c)	70-71-73-75=289	+1	60,000
2	(United States) Lou Graham	71-70-74-75=290	+2	34,200
3	(United States) Lon Hinkle	75-72-74-70=291	+3	21,300
T4	(United States) Ben Crenshaw	70-71-77-74=292	+4	11,700
T4	(United States) Larry Nelson	71-72-75-74=292	+4	11,700
T4	(United States) Andy North	74-71-74-73=292	+4	11,700
T4	(United States) John Schroeder	70-75-76-71=292	+4	11,700
8	(United States) Jim Colbert	74-74-74-72=294	+6	8,850
T9	(United States) Hubert Green	76-77-71-71=295	+7	7,500
T9	(England) Peter Oosterhuis	73-73-75-74=295	+7	7,500
T9	(Mexico) Victor Regalado	70-79-76-70=295	+7	7,500

Leaderboard below the top 10
Place	Player	Score	To par	Money ($)
T12	(United States) Jerry Heard	73-78-71-74=296	+8	5,460
T12	(United States) John Mahaffey	72-72-75-77=296	+8	5,460
T12	(United States) Mike McCullough	77-75-69-75=296	+8	5,460
T12	(Argentina) Florentino Molina	72-74-76-74=296	+8	5,460
T12	(United States) Bobby Wadkins	70-79-73-74=296	+8	5,460
T17	(United States) Lee Elder	75-76-75-71=297	+9	4,200
T17	(United States) Phil Hancock	73-74-75-75=297	+9	4,200
T17	(United States) Jerry Pate	76-76-75-70=297	+9	4,200
T20	(United States) Danny Edwards	75-73-75-75=298	+10	2,892
T20	(Australia) David Graham	72-74-78-74=298	+10	2,892
T20	(Australia) Graham Marsh	73-76-73-76=298	+10	2,892
T20	(United States) Mac McLendon	72-74-76-76=298	+10	2,892
T20	(United States) Gil Morgan	73-77-76-72=298	+10	2,892
T20	(United States) John Schlee	77-73-75-73=298	+10	2,892
T20	(Australia) Bob Shearer	74-75-72-77=298	+10	2,892
27	(United States) Rod Funseth	74-73-78-74=299	+11	2,310
T28	(United States) Andy Bean	73-78-76-73=300	+12	1,791
T28	(United States) Keith Fergus	73-75-82-70=300	+12	1,791
T28	(United States) Gibby Gilbert	70-77-79-74=300	+12	1,791
T28	(United States) Mark Hayes (c)	73-77-77-73=300	+12	1,791
T28	(United States) Joe Inman	71-75-79-75=300	+12	1,791
T28	(United States) Tom Kite	74-77-78-71=300	+12	1,791
T28	(United States) Lyn Lott	75-76-78-71=300	+12	1,791
T28	(South Africa) Gary Player	74-73-77-76=300	+12	1,791
T28	(United States) Alan Tapie	73-75-82-70=300	+12	1,791
T28	(United States) Kermit Zarley	75-77-73-75=300	+12	1,791
T28	(United States) Bob Zender	75-73-73-79=300	+12	1,791
T39	(United States) Sam Adams	74-72-77-78=301	+13	1,290
T39	(United States) Fred Marti	72-79-77-73=301	+13	1,290
T39	(United States) Leonard Thompson	74-76-79-72=301	+13	1,290
T42	(United States) Frank Conner	75-74-75-78=302	+14	1,082
T42	(United States) Morris Hatalsky	74-79-74-75=302	+14	1,082
T42	(United States) Hale Irwin	75-75-75-77=302	+14	1,082
T42	(United States) Billy Kratzert	75-76-75-76=302	+14	1,082
T46	(United States) Miller Barber	78-74-76-75=303	+15	975
T46	(South Africa) Bobby Cole	72-79-81-71=303	+15	975
T46	(United States) Charles Coody	73-76-74-80=303	+15	975
T46	(United States) Don January	73-74-79-77=303	+15	975
T50	(United States) Mike Morley	72-73-79-80=304	+16	945
T50	(United States) Mark Pfeil	74-75-78-77=304	+16	945
T52	(United States) Bob Eastwood	79-72-82-72=305	+17	910
T52	(United States) Peter Jacobsen	74-76-80-75=305	+17	910
T52	(United States) Artie McNickle	71-75-82-77=305	+17	910
T52	(United States) Bill Rogers	73-75-79-78=305	+17	910
T52	(United States) Jim Simons	73-80-79-73=305	+17	910
T57	(United States) Jay Haas	76-76-76-78=306	+18	860
T57	(United States) Steve Melnyk	76-75-79-76=306	+18	860
T57	(United States) Mike Reid	76-77-75-78=306	+18	860
T57	(United States) Ron Streck	75-78-77-76=306	+18	860
T57	(United States) Tom Weiskopf	73-80-74-79=306	+18	860
62	(United States) Chi Chi Rodriguez	73-77-80-77=307	+19	830
T63	(United States) Wayne Levi	74-75-82-77=308	+20	810
T63	(United States) Allen Miller	74-73-79-82=308	+20	810
T63	(United States) Art Wall Jr.	73-79-77-79=308	+20	810
T66	(United States) Don Bies	76-77-81-75=309	+21	770
T66	(United States) Rex Caldwell	75-76-80-78=309	+21	770
T66	(United States) Gary Groh	70-77-79-83=309	+21	770
T66	(United States) Gary McCord	77-75-77-80=309	+21	770
T66	(United States) Jerry McGee	76-76-75-82=309	+21	770
T71	(United States) Tom Shaw	76-75-83-76=310	+22	750
T71	(United States) J. C. Snead	74-77-82-77=310	+22	750
T73	(United States) Rod Curl	75-78-82-76=311	+23	750
T73	(New Zealand) John Lister	76-76-81-78=311	+23	750
T75	(United States) Homero Blancas	74-77-84-77=312	+24	750
T75	(United States) Howard Twitty	78-75-81-78=312	+24	750
T77	(United States) Forrest Fezler	76-75-82-80=313	+25	750
T77	(United States) Arnold Palmer	74-78-76-85=313	+25	750
CUT	(United States) George Burns	79-75=154	+10	
CUT	(United States) Dave Eichelberger	78-76=154	+10	
CUT	(United States) Raymond Floyd	77-77=154	+10	
CUT	(United States) Mike Hill	76-78=154	+10	
CUT	(United States) Rik Massengale	73-81=154	+10	
CUT	(United States) Dwight Nevil	78-76=154	+10	
CUT	(United States) Sammy Rachels	77-77=154	+10	
CUT	(United States) Steve Taylor	76-78=154	+10	
CUT	(United States) Tom Watson	76-78=154	+10	
CUT	(United States) Bill Calfee	79-76=155	+11	
CUT	(United States) Billy Casper	77-78=155	+11	
CUT	(United States) Jim Dent	74-81=155	+11	
CUT	(United States) Terry Diehl	78-77=155	+11	
CUT	(United States) Tom Jenkins	77-78=155	+11	
CUT	(United States) Bruce Lietzke	77-78=155	+11	
CUT	(United States) Jeff Mitchell	74-81=155	+11	
CUT	(United States) Joe Porter	76-79=155	+11	
CUT	(United States) Tom Purtzer	75-80=155	+11	
CUT	(United States) Jack Renner	75-80=155	+11	
CUT	(United States) Dan Sikes	74-81=155	+11	
CUT	(United States) Ed Sneed	76-79=155	+11	
CUT	(United States) Wally Armstrong	77-79=156	+12	
CUT	(United States) Butch Baird	78-78=156	+12	
CUT	(United States) Don Iverson	81-75=156	+12	
CUT	(United States) Grier Jones	79-77=156	+12	
CUT	(United States) Orville Moody	74-82=156	+12	
CUT	(United States) Bob Payne	75-81=156	+12	
CUT	(United States) Dave Stockton	79-77=156	+12	
CUT	(United States) Curtis Strange	83-73=156	+12	
CUT	(United States) Doug Tewell	79-77=156	+12	
CUT	(United States) Bobby Walzel	78-78=156	+12	
CUT	(Australia) Bruce Devlin	76-81=157	+13	
CUT	(United States) Barry Jaeckel	76-81=157	+13	
CUT	(United States) Gary Koch	77-80=157	+13	
CUT	(United States) Stan Lee	80-77=157	+13	
CUT	(United States) Mark Lye	78-79=157	+13	
CUT	(United States) Roger Maltbie	79-78=157	+13	
CUT	(United States) Eddie Pearce	80-77=157	+13	
CUT	(United States) Don Pooley	74-83=157	+13	
CUT	(United States) Bob E. Smith	74-83=157	+13	
CUT	(United States) Bobby Nichols	77-81=158	+14	
CUT	(United States) Barney Thompson	76-82=158	+14	
CUT	(United States) Larry Ziegler	79-79=158	+14	
CUT	(United States) Tommy Aaron	83-76=159	+15	
CUT	(United States) Bob Gilder	74-85=159	+15	
CUT	(Canada) George Knudson	80-79=159	+15	
CUT	(United States) Johnny Miller	77-82=159	+15	
CUT	(United States) Frank Beard	80-80=160	+16	
CUT	(Mexico) Antonio Cerda Jr.	82-78=160	+16	
CUT	(United States) Randy Erskine	75-85=160	+16	
CUT	(South Africa) Dale Hayes	77-83=160	+16	
CUT	(United States) Bob Murphy	78-82=160	+16	
CUT	(United States) Ken Still	80-80=160	+16	
CUT	(United States) Fuzzy Zoeller	77-83=160	+16	
CUT	(United States) Lanny Wadkins	79-82=161	+17	
CUT	(United States) Calvin Peete	81-81=162	+18	
CUT	(United States) Tim Simpson	81-81=162	+18	
CUT	(United States) Bob Wynn	76-86=162	+18	
CUT	(United States) Ed Dougherty	78-85=163	+19	
CUT	(United States) Craig Stadler	79-85=164	+20	
CUT	(United States) Bill Mallon	84-85=169	+25	
CUT	(United States) George Cadle	81-89=170	+26	
WD	(United States) Lee Trevino	75-78=153	+9	
WD	(United States) Gene Littler			
