= 1980 Tournament Players Championship =

Tournament information
- Dates: March 20–23, 1980
- Location: Ponte Vedra Beach, Florida; 30.189°N 81.370°W
- Courses: Sawgrass Country Club, East-West course
- Tour: PGA Tour

Statistics
- Par: 72
- Length: 7,000 yards (6,400 m)
- Field: 144 players, 79 after cut
- Cut: 148 (+4)
- Prize fund: $440,000
- Winner's share: $72,000

Champion
- (United States) Lee Trevino
- 278 (−10)

Location map
- Location in the United States Location in Florida

The 1980 Tournament Players Championship was a golf tournament in Florida on the PGA Tour, held March 20–23 at Sawgrass Country Club in Ponte Vedra Beach, southeast of Jacksonville. The seventh Tournament Players Championship, it was the fourth at Sawgrass and Lee Trevino won at 278 (−10), one stroke ahead of runner-up Ben Crenshaw.

Defending champion Lanny Wadkins finished thirteen strokes back, in a tie for 45th place.

== Venue ==
This was the fourth of five Tournament Players Championships held at Sawgrass Country Club; it moved to the nearby TPC at Sawgrass Stadium Course in 1982. At the time it was scheduled to be the last at Sawgrass, but early construction delays due to weather caused the championship to return for a fifth and final year in 1981.

== Eligibility requirements ==
1. All designated players

Andy Bean (2), Ben Crenshaw (2), Lee Elder, Raymond Floyd (2), Al Geiberger (2), Bob Gilder, David Graham (2), Lou Graham (2), Hubert Green (2), Mark Hayes, Lon Hinkle (2), Hale Irwin (2), Tom Kite, Wayne Levi (2), Bruce Lietzke, John Mahaffey, Jerry McGee (2), Gil Morgan (2), Larry Nelson (2), Jack Nicklaus, Andy North, Jerry Pate, Calvin Peete (2), Gary Player, Tom Purtzer, Jack Renner (2), Bill Rogers, J. C. Snead, Ed Sneed, Dave Stockton, Curtis Strange (2), Lee Trevino (2), Howard Twitty (2), Bobby Wadkins, Lanny Wadkins (2), Tom Watson (2), Fuzzy Zoeller (2)

2. Winners of major PGA Tour co-sponsored or approved events beginning with the 1979 Players Championship and concluding with the tournament immediately preceding the 1980 Players Championship

Bobby Walzel, Chi-Chi Rodríguez, D. A. Weibring, John Fought, Ed Fiori, George Burns, Craig Stadler, Jeff Mitchell, Jim Colbert, Dave Eichelberger, Johnny Miller

3. The current British Open champion

Seve Ballesteros

4. Leaders in the PGA Tour Official Standings as necessary to complete the field, beginning with the 1979 Players Championship and concluding with the Jackie Gleason-Inverrary Classic, which concludes March 9, 1980

== Field ==
Tommy Aaron, Buddy Allin, George Archer, Wally Armstrong, Seve Ballesteros, Miller Barber, Andy Bean, Don Bies, Mike Brannan, Brad Bryant, George Burns, Bob Byman, George Cadle, Rex Caldwell, Bill Calfee, Jim Chancey, Jim Colbert, Frank Conner, Charles Coody, Ben Crenshaw, Rod Curl, Jim Dent, Bruce Devlin, Terry Diehl, Ed Dougherty, Bob Eastwood, Danny Edwards, David Edwards, David Eger, Dave Eichelberger, Lee Elder, Keith Fergus, Forrest Fezler, Ed Fiori, Bruce Fleisher, Raymond Floyd, John Fought, Rod Funseth, Buddy Gardner, Gibby Gilbert, Bob Gilder, David Graham, Lou Graham, Hubert Green, Jay Haas, Dan Halldorson, Phil Hancock, Morris Hatalsky, Mark Hayes, Dave Hill, Mike Hill, Lon Hinkle, Joe Inman, Hale Irwin, Peter Jacobsen, Barry Jaeckel, Don January, Grier Jones, Tom Kite, Gary Koch, Billy Kratzert, Stan Lee, Wayne Levi, Bruce Lietzke, John Lister, Gene Littler, Mark Lye, John Mahaffey, Bob Mann, Graham Marsh, Fred Marti, Rik Massengale, Terry Mauney, Gary McCord, Mike McCullough, Mark McCumber, Jerry McGee, Pat McGowan, Artie McNickle, Steve Melnyk, Allen Miller, Johnny Miller, Lindy Miller, Jeff Mitchell, Orville Moody, Gil Morgan, Mike Morley, Bob Murphy, Jim Nelford, Larry Nelson, Jack Newton, Jack Nicklaus, Lonnie Nielsen, Andy North, Peter Oosterhuis, Jerry Pate, Eddie Pearce, Calvin Peete, Mark Pfeil, Gary Player, Dan Pohl, Don Pooley, Greg Powers, Tom Purtzer, Dana Quigley, Sammy Rachels, Victor Regalado, Mike Reid, Jack Renner, Chi-Chi Rodríguez, Bill Rogers, Bill Sander, Cesar Sanudo, John Schroeder, Bob Shearer, Jim Simons, Scott Simpson, Tim Simpson, Bob E. Smith, J. C. Snead, Ed Sneed, Craig Stadler, Ken Still, Dave Stockton, Curtis Strange, Ron Streck, Mike Sullivan, Alan Tapie, Doug Tewell, Barney Thompson, Leonard Thompson, Jim Thorpe, Lee Trevino, Howard Twitty, Bobby Wadkins, Lanny Wadkins, Bobby Walzel, Tom Watson, D. A. Weibring, Tom Weiskopf, Kermit Zarley, Bob Zender, Larry Ziegler, Fuzzy Zoeller

== Round summaries ==
=== First round ===
Thursday, March 20, 1980

Place	Player	Score	To par
T1	(United States) Hale Irwin	67	−5
T1	(United States) Steve Melnyk	67	−5
T3	(United States) George Burns	68	−4
T3	(United States) Bill Calfee	68	−4
T3	(United States) Danny Edwards	68	−4
T3	(United States) Joe Inman	68	−4
T3	(United States) Peter Jacobsen	68	−4
T3	(United States) Mike Morley	68	−4
T3	(United States) Ed Sneed	68	−4
T3	(United States) Curtis Strange	68	−4
T3	(United States) Ron Streck	68	−4
T3	(United States) Lee Trevino	68	−4

=== Second round ===
Friday, March 21, 1980

Place	Player	Score	To par
T1	(United States) Hale Irwin	67-72=139	−5
T1	(United States) Curtis Strange	68-71=139	−5
T3	(United States) Steve Melnyk	67-73=140	−4
T3	(United States) Lee Trevino	68-72=140	−4
T3	(United States) Tom Watson	69-71=140	−4
T6	(United States) John Mahaffey	70-71=141	−3
T6	(South Africa) Gary Player	70-71=141	−3
T6	(United States) Greg Powers	72-69=141	−3
T6	(United States) J. C. Snead	70-71=141	−3
T10	(Spain) Seve Ballesteros	69-73=142	−2
T10	(United States) George Burns	68-74=142	−2
T10	(United States) Bill Calfee	68-74=142	−2
T10	(United States) Danny Edwards	68-74=142	−2
T10	(United States) Peter Jacobsen	68-74=142	−2
T10	(United States) Jack Nicklaus	69-73=142	−2
T10	(United States) Don Pooley	69-73=142	−2
T10	(United States) Mike Reid	70-72=142	−2

=== Third round ===
Saturday, March 22, 1980

Place	Player	Score	To par
1	(United States) Lee Trevino	68-72-68=208	−8
2	(United States) Hubert Green	72-71-66=209	−7
T3	(South Africa) Gary Player	70-71-69=210	−6
T3	(United States) Curtis Strange	68-71-71=210	−6
T5	(Spain) Seve Ballesteros	69-73-69=211	−5
T5	(United States) Peter Jacobsen	68-74-69=211	−5
T5	(United States) Jack Nicklaus	69-73-69=211	−5
T5	(United States) Don Pooley	69-73-69=211	−5
T9	(United States) Brad Bryant	72-71-69=212	−4
T9	(United States) Jay Haas	72-73-67=212	−4
T9	(United States) Hale Irwin	67-72-73=212	−4
T9	(United States) Tom Watson	69-71-72=212	−4

=== Final round ===
Sunday, March 23, 1980

Champion
(c) = past champion

Place	Player	Score	To par	Money ($)
1	(United States) Lee Trevino	68-72-68-70=278	−10	72,000
2	(United States) Ben Crenshaw	71-73-69-66=279	−9	43,200
T3	(Spain) Seve Ballesteros	69-73-69-69=280	−8	23,200
T3	(United States) Tom Watson	69-71-72-68=280	−8	23,200
T5	(United States) Peter Jacobsen	68-74-69-71=282	−6	14,600
T5	(United States) John Mahaffey	70-71-72-69=282	−6	14,600
T5	(United States) Mike Reid	70-72-72-68=282	−6	14,600
T8	(United States) Danny Edwards	68-74-72-69=283	−5	10,400
T8	(United States) Hubert Green	72-71-66-74=283	−5	10,400
T8	(United States) Jay Haas	72-73-67-71=283	−5	10,400
T8	(United States) Grier Jones	74-69-72-68=283	−5	10,400
T8	(South Africa) Gary Player	70-71-69-73=283	−5	10,400
T8	(United States) Dan Pohl	73-72-69-69=283	−5	10,400

Leaderboard below the top 10
Place	Player	Score	To par	Money ($)
T14	(United States) Brad Bryant	72-71-69-72=284	−4	6,400
T14	(United States) Jim Colbert	71-73-69-71=284	−4	6,400
T14	(United States) Charles Coody	69-75-69-71=284	−4	6,400
T14	(United States) Keith Fergus	70-73-70-71=284	−4	6,400
T14	(United States) Hale Irwin	67-72-73-72=284	−4	6,400
T14	(United States) Jack Nicklaus (c)	69-73-69-73=284	−4	6,400
T14	(United States) Don Pooley	69-73-69-73=284	−4	6,400
21	(United States) Curtis Strange	68-71-71-75=285	−3	4,800
T22	(United States) Bill Calfee	68-74-73-71=286	−2	4,320
T22	(Canada) Dan Halldorson	72-74-68-72=286	−2	4,320
T24	(United States) George Burns	68-74-71-74=287	−1	3,165
T24	(United States) Bruce Fleisher	71-73-71-72=287	−1	3,165
T24	(United States) Bruce Lietzke	72-74-74-67=287	−1	3,165
T24	(United States) Fred Marti	73-73-73-68=287	−1	3,165
T24	(United States) Rik Massengale	74-71-72-70=287	−1	3,165
T24	(United States) Mike McCullough	71-76-68-72=287	−1	3,165
T24	(United States) Steve Melnyk	67-73-76-71=287	−1	3,165
T31	(United States) Gibby Gilbert	70-75-75-68=288	E	2,220
T31	(United States) Mike Hill	70-75-71-72=288	E	2,220
T31	(United States) Tom Kite	74-72-69-73=288	E	2,220
T31	(United States) Johnny Miller	76-71-71-70=288	E	2,220
T31	(United States) Gil Morgan	70-78-71-69=288	E	2,220
T31	(United States) Bill Rogers	69-77-71-71=288	E	2,220
T31	(United States) J. C. Snead	70-71-73-74=288	E	2,220
T31	(United States) Howard Twitty	75-70-71-72=288	E	2,220
T39	(United States) Bob Eastwood	73-75-70-71=289	+1	1,760
T39	(United States) Lon Hinkle	70-74-71-74=289	+1	1,760
T41	(United States) Mike Brannan	71-75-75-69=290	+2	1,520
T41	(Australia) David Graham	70-74-72-74=290	+2	1,520
T41	(United States) Jerry McGee	71-75-71-73=290	+2	1,520
T41	(United States) Chi-Chi Rodríguez	70-73-74-73=290	+2	1,520
T45	(United States) Mark Hayes (c)	70-75-75-71=291	+3	1,144
T45	(United States) Tim Simpson	70-74-73-74=291	+3	1,144
T45	(United States) Dave Stockton	73-70-74-74=291	+3	1,144
T45	(United States) Ron Streck	68-77-70-76=291	+3	1,144
T45	(United States) Jim Thorpe	72-73-71-75=291	+3	1,144
T45	(United States) Lanny Wadkins (c)	69-76-72-74=291	+3	1,144
T51	(United States) Andy Bean	71-73-76-72=292	+4	954
T51	(United States) Scott Simpson	71-74-77-70=292	+4	954
T51	(United States) Alan Tapie	72-75-72-73=292	+4	954
T51	(United States) Barney Thompson	70-74-77-71=292	+4	954
T55	(United States) Jeff Mitchell	71-77-74-71=293	+5	904
T55	(Australia) Jack Newton	73-75-72-73=293	+5	904
T55	(United States) Greg Powers	72-69-78-74=293	+5	904
T55	(United States) Leonard Thompson	70-76-74-73=293	+5	904
T55	(United States) Tom Weiskopf	73-73-74-73=293	+5	904
T60	(United States) Buddy Gardner	70-74-77-73=294	+6	868
T60	(United States) Lou Graham	71-77-74-72=294	+6	868
T60	(United States) Joe Inman	68-75-78-73=294	+6	868
T60	(Canada) Jim Nelford	74-72-75-73=294	+6	868
T64	(United States) Terry Mauney	72-75-72-76=295	+7	840
T64	(United States) Bob Murphy	73-75-77-70=295	+7	840
T64	(United States) D. A. Weibring	73-73-75-74=295	+7	840
T67	(United States) Lee Elder	73-73-76-74=296	+8	816
T67	(Mexico) Victor Regalado	73-75-75-73=296	+8	816
T67	(United States) Craig Stadler	73-74-70-79=296	+8	816
T70	(United States) Rod Funseth	70-76-76-75=297	+9	792
T70	(United States) Calvin Peete	73-72-77-75=297	+9	792
T70	(United States) Ed Sneed	68-78-78-73=297	+9	792
T73	(United States) John Fought	72-75-77-74=298	+10	772
T73	(United States) Lonnie Nielsen	71-73-75-79=298	+10	772
T75	(United States) Wally Armstrong	72-76-73-78=299	+11	756
T75	(United States) Bob E. Smith	72-76-78-73=299	+11	756
77	(United States) Terry Diehl	73-75-82-71=301	+13	750
78	(United States) Mark Lye	73-74-78-78=303	+15	750
79	(United States) David Edwards	75-73-80-79=307	+19	750
CUT	(United States) Buddy Allin	74-75=149	+5	
CUT	(United States) George Cadle	74-75=149	+5	
CUT	(United States) Rod Curl	69-80=149	+5	
CUT	(United States) David Eger	75-74=149	+5	
CUT	(United States) Raymond Floyd	73-76=149	+5	
CUT	(United States) Pat McGowan	70-79=149	+5	
CUT	(United States) Andy North	77-72=149	+5	
CUT	(United States) Jerry Pate	72-77=149	+5	
CUT	(United States) Tom Purtzer	74-75=149	+5	
CUT	(Australia) Bob Shearer	71-78=149	+5	
CUT	(United States) Bobby Wadkins	70-79=149	+5	
CUT	(United States) Tommy Aaron	75-75=150	+6	
CUT	(United States) Rex Caldwell	73-77=150	+6	
CUT	(United States) Frank Conner	74-76=150	+6	
CUT	(Australia) Bruce Devlin	74-76=150	+6	
CUT	(United States) Ed Dougherty	75-75=150	+6	
CUT	(United States) Gene Littler	69-81=150	+6	
CUT	(United States) Bob Mann	73-77=150	+6	
CUT	(United States) Ken Still	78-72=150	+6	
CUT	(United States) Larry Ziegler	73-77=150	+6	
CUT	(United States) Don Bies	72-79=151	+7	
CUT	(Australia) Graham Marsh	73-78=151	+7	
CUT	(United States) Mark Pfeil	74-77=151	+7	
CUT	(United States) Sammy Rachels	72-79=151	+7	
CUT	(United States) Jack Renner	76-75=151	+7	
CUT	(Mexico) Cesar Sanudo	78-73=151	+7	
CUT	(United States) Jim Simons	70-81=151	+7	
CUT	(United States) Miller Barber	75-77=152	+8	
CUT	(United States) Bob Gilder	77-75=152	+8	
CUT	(United States) Phil Hancock	74-78=152	+8	
CUT	(United States) Morris Hatalsky	78-74=152	+8	
CUT	(United States) Barry Jaeckel	75-77=152	+8	
CUT	(United States) Gary Koch	77-75=152	+8	
CUT	(United States) Gary McCord	78-74=152	+8	
CUT	(United States) Mark McCumber	74-78=152	+8	
CUT	(United States) Orville Moody	76-76=152	+8	
CUT	(England) Peter Oosterhuis	77-75=152	+8	
CUT	(United States) Eddie Pearce	72-80=152	+8	
CUT	(United States) Bob Byman	72-81=153	+9	
CUT	(United States) Jim Chancey	74-79=153	+9	
CUT	(United States) Dave Hill	72-81=153	+9	
CUT	(United States) Billy Kratzert	73-80=153	+9	
CUT	(New Zealand) John Lister	79-74=153	+9	
CUT	(United States) Dana Quigley	74-79=153	+9	
CUT	(United States) Doug Tewell	77-76=153	+9	
CUT	(United States) Kermit Zarley	76-77=153	+9	
CUT	(United States) George Archer	75-79=154	+10	
CUT	(United States) Forrest Fezler	77-77=154	+10	
CUT	(United States) Stan Lee	74-80=154	+10	
CUT	(United States) John Schroeder	76-78=154	+10	
CUT	(United States) Bob Zender	79-75=154	+10	
CUT	(United States) Fuzzy Zoeller	79-75=154	+10	
CUT	(United States) Dave Eichelberger	81-74=155	+11	
CUT	(United States) Mike Sullivan	76-79=155	+11	
CUT	(United States) Don January	77-79=156	+12	
CUT	(United States) Allen Miller	73-83=156	+12	
CUT	(United States) Lindy Miller	77-79=156	+12	
CUT	(United States) Bill Sander	72-85=157	+13	
CUT	(United States) Bobby Walzel	75-84=159	+15	
CUT	(United States) Jim Dent	77-83=160	+16	
WD	(United States) Artie McNickle	73	+1	
WD	(United States) Wayne Levi	76	+4	
WD	(United States) Ed Fiori			
DQ	(United States) Larry Nelson	69-78=147	+3	
DQ	(United States) Mike Morley	68	−4	
