= 1981 Tournament Players Championship =

Tournament information
- Dates: March 19–23, 1981
- Location: Ponte Vedra Beach, Florida; 30.189°N 81.370°W
- Courses: Sawgrass Country Club, East-West course
- Tour: PGA Tour

Statistics
- Par: 72
- Length: 7,000 yards (6,400 m)
- Field: 143 players, 74 after cut
- Cut: 151 (+7)
- Prize fund: $440,000
- Winner's share: $72,000

Champion
- (United States) Raymond Floyd
- 285 (−3), playoff

Location map
- Location in the United States Location in Florida

The 1981 Tournament Players Championship was a golf tournament in Florida on the PGA Tour, held March 19–23 at Sawgrass Country Club in Ponte Vedra Beach, southeast of Jacksonville. The eighth Tournament Players Championship, it was the fifth consecutive at Sawgrass and the champion was Raymond Floyd.

The final round on Sunday was washed-out by thunderstorms and played on Monday. After 72 holes, three players were tied at 285 (−3): Floyd, Barry Jaeckel, and Curtis Strange. The playoff began at the par-3 15th hole, where Floyd made par and the other two had bogeys.

In addition to the winner's share of $72,000, Floyd won a $250,000 bonus for consecutive victories during the tour's Florida swing; he won at Doral near Miami the previous week.

Defending champion Lee Trevino finished four strokes back, in a tie for twelfth place.

== Venue ==
This was the fifth and last Tournament Players Championship held at Sawgrass Country Club; it moved to the nearby TPC at Sawgrass Stadium Course in 1982. The new course was scheduled to make its debut in 1981, but heavy rains during construction pushed it back a year.

== Eligibility requirements ==
1. All designated players

2. Winners of major PGA Tour co-sponsored or approved events beginning with the 1980 Tournament Players Championship and concluding with the tournament immediately preceding the 1981 TPC

Lee Trevino, Doug Tewell, Craig Stadler, Seve Ballesteros, Roger Maltbie, Tom Watson (3), Mark Pfeil, Curtis Strange, Bruce Lietzke, David Graham, John Mahaffey, Larry Nelson, Jack Nicklaus, Bob Gilder, Scott Simpson, Billy Kratzert, Scott Hoch, Howard Twitty, Peter Jacobsen, Don Pooley, Wayne Levi, Phil Hancock, Ben Crenshaw, Mike Sullivan, Dan Halldorson, Danny Edwards, David Edwards, Johnny Miller, John Cook, Hale Irwin, Andy Bean, Tom Kite, Raymond Floyd

3. The current British Open champion

4. Leaders in the PGA Tour Official Standings as necessary to complete the field, beginning with the 1980 TPC and concluding with the Jackie Gleason-Inverrary Classic, which concludes March 8, 1981

== Field ==
John Adams, Buddy Allin, Wally Armstrong, Butch Baird, Seve Ballesteros, Miller Barber, Andy Bean, Chip Beck, Mike Brannan, Brad Bryant, George Burns, George Cadle, Rex Caldwell, Bill Calfee, Roger Calvin, Antonio Cerda Jr., Jon Chaffee, Bobby Clampett, Jim Colbert, Bobby Cole, Frank Conner, Charles Coody, John Cook, Ben Crenshaw, Rod Curl, Jim Dent, Bruce Devlin, Terry Diehl, Mike Donald, Bruce Douglass, Skip Dunaway, Bob Eastwood, Danny Edwards, David Edwards, Dave Eichelberger, Lee Elder, Keith Fergus, Ed Fiori, Raymond Floyd, John Fought, Buddy Gardner, Gibby Gilbert, Bob Gilder, Jaime Gonzalez, Mike Gove, David Graham, Lou Graham, Hubert Green, Jay Haas, Joe Hager, Gary Hallberg, Dan Halldorson, Phil Hancock, Morris Hatalsky, Mark Hayes, Vance Heafner, Dave Hill, Lon Hinkle, Scott Hoch, Joe Inman, Hale Irwin, Peter Jacobsen, Barry Jaeckel, Tom Jenkins, Grier Jones, Gary Koch, Billy Kratzert, Wayne Levi, Bruce Lietzke, Gene Littler, Lyn Lott, Mark Lye, John Mahaffey, Roger Maltbie, Rik Massengale, Terry Mauney, Mike McCullough, Mark McCumber, Jerry McGee, Pat McGowan, Artie McNickle, Steve Melnyk, Johnny Miller, Jeff Mitchell, Gil Morgan, Mike Morley, Bob Murphy, Jim Nelford, Larry Nelson, Jack Newton, Bobby Nichols, Jack Nicklaus, Mike Nicolette, Lonnie Nielsen, Andy North, Mark O'Meara, Peter Oosterhuis, Arnold Palmer, Jerry Pate, Calvin Peete, Mark Pfeil, Gary Player, Dan Pohl, Don Pooley, Greg Powers, Tom Purtzer, Dana Quigley, Sammy Rachels, Victor Regalado, Mike Reid, Jack Renner, Chi-Chi Rodríguez, Bill Rogers, Mark Rohde, John Schroeder, Bob Shearer, Jim Simons, Scott Simpson, Tim Simpson, J. C. Snead, Ed Sneed, Mick Soli, Craig Stadler, Dave Stockton, Curtis Strange, Ron Streck, Mike Sullivan, Alan Tapie, Doug Tewell, Barney Thompson, Leonard Thompson, Jim Thorpe, Lee Trevino, Howard Twitty, Tommy Valentine, Bobby Wadkins, Lanny Wadkins, Bobby Walzel, Tom Watson, D. A. Weibring, Tom Weiskopf, Larry Ziegler, Fuzzy Zoeller

== Round summaries ==
=== First round ===
Thursday, March 20, 1981

Place	Player	Score	To par
T1	(United States) Dave Eichelberger	68	−4
T1	(United States) Mike Morley	68	−4
T3	(United States) Jim Dent	69	−3
T3	(United States) Barry Jaeckel	69	−3
T5	(Canada) Dan Halldorson	70	−2
T5	(United States) Mike Sullivan	70	−2
T7	(United States) Gary Hallberg	71	−1
T7	(United States) Roger Maltbie	71	−1
T7	(United States) Johnny Miller	71	−1
T7	(United States) Gil Morgan	71	−1
T7	(United States) Mark O'Meara	71	−1
T7	(United States) Tom Purtzer	71	−1
T7	(United States) Leonard Thompson	71	−1

=== Second round ===
Friday, March 20, 1981

Place	Player	Score	To par
1	(United States) Barry Jaeckel	69-70=139	−5
T2	(United States) Danny Edwards	72-68=140	−4
T2	(Canada) Dan Halldorson	70-70=140	−4
4	(United States) Jim Simons	73-68=141	−3
5	(United States) Jim Dent	69-73=142	−2
T6	(United States) John Mahaffey	73-70=143	−1
T6	(United States) Jack Nicklaus	75-68=143	−1
T8	(United States) Dave Eichelberger	68-76=144	E
T8	(United States) Gary Hallberg	71-73=144	E
T8	(United States) Mark O'Meara	71-73=144	E
T8	(United States) Dan Pohl	72-72=144	E
T8	(United States) Tom Purtzer	71-73=144	E
T8	(United States) Curtis Strange	72-72=144	E

=== Third round ===
Saturday, March 21, 1981

Place	Player	Score	To par
1	(United States) Barry Jaeckel	69-70-72=211	−5
T2	(Canada) Dan Halldorson	70-70-74=214	−2
T2	(United States) John Mahaffey	73-70-71=214	−2
T2	(United States) Jim Simons	73-68-73=214	−2
5	(United States) Curtis Strange	72-72-71=215	−1
T6	(United States) Jim Colbert	78-69-69=216	E
T6	(United States) Frank Conner	74-72-70=216	E
T6	(United States) Gary Hallberg	71-73-72=216	E
T6	(United States) Bruce Lietzke	73-75-68=216	E
T6	(United States) Mark O'Meara	71-73-72=216	E
T6	(United States) Lee Trevino	73-73-70=216	E

=== Final round ===
Monday, March 23, 1981

Champion
(c) = past champion

Place	Player	Score	To par	Money ($)
T1	(United States) Raymond Floyd	72-74-71-68=285	−3	Playoff
T1	(United States) Barry Jaeckel	69-70-72-74=285	−3	Playoff
T1	(United States) Curtis Strange	72-72-71-70=285	−3	Playoff
T4	(United States) Miller Barber	72-78-69-68=287	−1	15,750
T4	(United States) Jim Colbert	78-69-69-71=287	−1	15,750
T4	(United States) Bruce Lietzke	73-75-68-71=287	−1	15,750
T4	(United States) Jim Simons	73-68-73-73=287	−1	15,750
T8	(United States) Frank Conner	74-72-70-72=288	E	11,200
T8	(United States) Gary Hallberg	71-73-72-72=288	E	11,200
T8	(Canada) Dan Halldorson	70-70-74-74=288	E	11,200
T8	(United States) Leonard Thompson	71-76-72-69=288	E	11,200

Leaderboard below the top 10
Place	Player	Score	To par	Money ($)
T12	(United States) Bobby Clampett	75-73-71-70=289	+1	7,371
T12	(United States) Grier Jones	73-73-73-70=289	+1	7,371
T12	(United States) Gil Morgan	71-78-73-67=289	+1	7,371
T12	(United States) Mike Morley	68-77-72-72=289	+1	7,371
T12	(United States) Jack Renner	73-73-72-71=289	+1	7,371
T12	(United States) Ron Streck	72-74-72-71=289	+1	7,371
T12	(United States) Lee Trevino (c)	73-73-70-73=289	+1	7,371
T19	(United States) John Mahaffey	73-70-71-76=290	+2	4,680
T19	(United States) Tom Purtzer	71-73-74-72=290	+2	4,680
T19	(United States) Dave Stockton	74-73-70-73=290	+2	4,680
T19	(United States) Barney Thompson	73-73-71-73=290	+2	4,680
T19	(United States) Bobby Walzel	73-72-73-72=290	+2	4,680
T19	(United States) Tom Weiskopf	76-74-69-71=290	+2	4,680
25	(United States) Danny Edwards	72-68-78-73=291	+3	3,520
T26	(United States) Dave Eichelberger	68-76-74-74=292	+4	3,080
T26	(United States) Wayne Levi	74-76-72-70=292	+4	3,080
T26	(United States) Mark O'Meara	71-73-72-76=292	+4	3,080
T29	(Spain) Seve Ballesteros	77-69-72-75=293	+5	2,600
T29	(United States) Charles Coody	74-74-75-70=293	+5	2,600
T29	(United States) Jay Haas	72-73-75-73=293	+5	2,600
T29	(United States) Jack Nicklaus (c)	75-68-74-76=293	+5	2,600
T29	(United States) Calvin Peete	74-76-71-72=293	+5	2,600
T34	(United States) Jim Dent	69-74-77-74=294	+6	2,160
T34	(United States) Mark Hayes (c)	74-72-75-73=294	+6	2,160
T34	(United States) Jerry McGee	72-75-74-73=294	+6	2,160
T37	(United States) Buddy Allin	75-72-73-75=295	+7	1,680
T37	(United States) Hubert Green	72-75-72-76=295	+7	1,680
T37	(United States) Scott Hoch	75-76-73-71=295	+7	1,680
T37	(United States) Joe Inman	76-72-69-78=295	+7	1,680
T37	(United States) Billy Kratzert	76-73-71-75=295	+7	1,680
T37	(United States) Johnny Miller	71-74-76-74=295	+7	1,680
T37	(United States) Howard Twitty	77-74-71-73=295	+7	1,680
T37	(United States) Bobby Wadkins	77-71-73-74=295	+7	1,680
T45	(United States) Roger Maltbie	71-77-71-77=296	+8	1,144
T45	(United States) Mark McCumber	74-75-75-72=296	+8	1,144
T45	(United States) Pat McGowan	73-75-72-76=296	+8	1,144
T45	(United States) Arnold Palmer	75-74-74-73=296	+8	1,144
T45	(United States) Jerry Pate	75-76-73-72=296	+8	1,144
T45	(United States) Dan Pohl	72-72-76-76=296	+8	1,144
T51	(United States) Lee Elder	75-75-76-71=297	+9	947
T51	(United States) Ed Fiori	75-76-71-75=297	+9	947
T51	(United States) Hale Irwin	72-75-78-72=297	+9	947
T51	(United States) Bill Rogers	73-74-71-79=297	+9	947
T51	(United States) D. A. Weibring	72-73-78-74=297	+9	947
T56	(United States) Rex Caldwell	72-75-73-78=298	+10	900
T56	(United States) Skip Dunaway	78-72-74-74=298	+10	900
T56	(United States) Keith Fergus	75-74-74-75=298	+10	900
T56	(United States) Tom Jenkins	74-77-72-75=298	+10	900
T60	(England) Peter Oosterhuis	75-76-72-76=299	+11	872
T60	(United States) Mark Pfeil	80-70-72-77=299	+11	872
T60	(United States) Mick Soli	73-78-74-74=299	+11	872
T63	(United States) Ben Crenshaw	74-73-77-76=300	+12	848
T63	(United States) Bob Gilder	73-74-78-75=300	+12	848
T63	(United States) Mike Sullivan	70-78-75-77=300	+12	848
T66	(United States) Lonnie Nielsen	76-75-73-77=301	+13	824
T66	(United States) Don Pooley	78-71-78-74=301	+13	824
T66	(United States) John Schroeder	76-75-75-75=301	+13	824
T69	(United States) Mike Gove	79-72-73-79=303	+15	804
T69	(United States) Andy North	73-76-74-80=303	+15	804
71	(United States) Bruce Douglass	73-76-79-76=304	+16	792
72	(United States) Lou Graham	77-74-77-78=306	+18	784
73	(United States) Rik Massengale	77-74-81-75=307	+19	776
74	(United States) Jim Thorpe	73-77-81-78=309	+21	768
CUT	(United States) John Adams	75-77=152	+8	
CUT	(United States) John Cook	76-76=152	+8	
CUT	(United States) Terry Diehl	74-78=152	+8	
CUT	(United States) David Edwards	77-75=152	+8	
CUT	(United States) Gibby Gilbert	78-74=152	+8	
CUT	(United States) Vance Heafner	78-74=152	+8	
CUT	(United States) Gene Littler	77-75=152	+8	
CUT	(United States) Artie McNickle	79-73=152	+8	
CUT	(United States) Larry Nelson	74-78=152	+8	
CUT	(United States) Dana Quigley	74-78=152	+8	
CUT	(United States) Scott Simpson	78-74=152	+8	
CUT	(United States) Tim Simpson	75-77=152	+8	
CUT	(United States) Craig Stadler	75-77=152	+8	
CUT	(United States) Tom Watson	72-80=152	+8	
CUT	(United States) Larry Ziegler	74-78=152	+8	
CUT	(United States) Mike Brannan	73-80=153	+9	
CUT	(United States) Jon Chaffee	78-75=153	+9	
CUT	(United States) Morris Hatalsky	76-77=153	+9	
CUT	(United States) Lyn Lott	78-75=153	+9	
CUT	(United States) Mark Lye	79-74=153	+9	
CUT	(United States) Steve Melnyk	77-76=153	+9	
CUT	(United States) Ed Sneed	76-77=153	+9	
CUT	(United States) Lanny Wadkins (c)	79-74=153	+9	
CUT	(United States) John Fought	77-77=154	+10	
CUT	(Brazil) Jaime Gonzalez	77-77=154	+10	
CUT	(United States) Phil Hancock	77-77=154	+10	
CUT	(South Africa) Gary Player	79-75=154	+10	
CUT	(Australia) Bob Shearer	79-75=154	+10	
CUT	(United States) Bob Eastwood	77-78=155	+11	
CUT	(United States) Terry Mauney	78-77=155	+11	
CUT	(United States) Jeff Mitchell	80-75=155	+11	
CUT	(United States) Bob Murphy	78-77=155	+11	
CUT	(Australia) Jack Newton	74-81=155	+11	
CUT	(Mexico) Victor Regalado	76-79=155	+11	
CUT	(United States) Fuzzy Zoeller	79-76=155	+11	
CUT	(United States) Roger Calvin	76-80=156	+12	
CUT	(United States) Bobby Nichols	77-79=156	+12	
CUT	(United States) Alan Tapie	74-82=156	+12	
CUT	(United States) Tommy Valentine	83-73=156	+12	
CUT	(United States) George Cadle	78-79=157	+13	
CUT	(United States) Buddy Gardner	79-78=157	+13	
CUT	(United States) Mike Nicolette	75-82=157	+13	
CUT	(United States) Chi-Chi Rodríguez	77-80=157	+13	
CUT	(United States) Doug Tewell	77-80=157	+13	
CUT	(United States) Mike McCullough	80-78=158	+14	
CUT	(United States) Greg Powers	81-77=158	+14	
CUT	(United States) Bill Calfee	80-79=159	+15	
CUT	(Australia) Bruce Devlin	81-78=159	+15	
CUT	(United States) Joe Hager	75-84=159	+15	
CUT	(United States) Dave Hill	80-79=159	+15	
CUT	(United States) Gary Koch	81-78=159	+15	
CUT	(Canada) Jim Nelford	81-78=159	+15	
CUT	(United States) Mike Reid	81-78=159	+15	
CUT	(United States) Wally Armstrong	82-78=160	+16	
CUT	(United States) Peter Jacobsen	77-83=160	+16	
CUT	(United States) Sammy Rachels	81-79=160	+16	
CUT	(United States) Brad Bryant	86-75=161	+17	
CUT	(United States) Mark Rohde	76-85=161	+17	
CUT	(United States) Rod Curl	82-80=162	+18	
CUT	(Australia) David Graham	82-80=162	+18	
CUT	(United States) Butch Baird	81-82=163	+19	
CUT	(United States) Chip Beck	76-87=163	+19	
CUT	(Mexico) Antonio Cerda Jr.	78-85=163	+19	
CUT	(United States) Mike Donald	83-83=166	+22	
CUT	(United States) Lon Hinkle	86-81=167	+23	
WD	(South Africa) Bobby Cole	75	+3	
WD	(United States) George Burns	76	+4	
WD	(United States) Andy Bean	78	+6	
WD	(United States) J. C. Snead	80	+8	

==== Playoff ====
The sudden-death playoff began and ended at the par-3 15th hole.

Place	Player	Score	To par	Money ($)
1	(United States) Raymond Floyd	3	E	72,000
T2	(United States) Barry Jaeckel	4	+1	35,200
T2	(United States) Curtis Strange	4	+1	35,200
