= Sawgrass Country Club =

Country club in Florida, United States

- Location within the United States Location within Florida
- 30.189°N 81.37°W

Club information
- Location: Ponte Vedra Beach, Florida, U.S.
- Elevation: 5 feet (1.5 m)
- Established: 1974; 52 years ago 2015 (renovation and South)
- Type: Private
- Tota holes: 27
- Tournaments: Tournament Players; Championship (1977–1981); Senior Tournament Players Championship (1987)
- Website: sawgrasscountryclub.com

East – West
- Designed by: Ed Seay (1974); Robert Walker (2015 renovation)
- Par: 72
- Length: 7,049 yards (6,446 m)
- Course rating: 74.8
- Slope rating: 148

South
- Designed by: Robert Walker (opened 2015)
- Par: 36
- Length: 3,513 yards (3,212 m)
- Course rating: 37.5
- Slope rating: 147

Sawgrass Country Club is a private member owned country club in the southeastern United States, located at Ponte Vedra Beach, Florida, southeast of Jacksonville. A Distinguished 5 Star Platinum Club of America and a Premier Private Country Club of Northeast Florida. The club hosted the PGA Tour's Tournament Players Championship five times, from 1977 through 1981.

== Golf ==
Founded in 1974, Sawgrass Country Club expanded to 27 holes of golf in the 80's. The original 18-hole course consists of the East and West nines, designed by Ed Seay, and is now joined by the equally challenging South Course by Robert Walker, who also renovated the other nines.

The club hosted the Players Championship from 1977 through 1981, where it was played on the East and West nines in mid- to late March. It moved to adjacent TPC Sawgrass in 1982, where it has been played every year since, and was renamed The Players Championship in 1988.

Tournament Players Championships (1977–1981)
Year	Winner	Country	Score	Margin of victory	Winner's share ($)	Purse ($)
1977	Mark Hayes	United States	289 (+1)	2 strokes	60,000	300,000
1978	Jack Nicklaus	United States	289 (+1)	1 stroke	60,000	300,000
1979	Lanny Wadkins	United States	283 (−5)	5 strokes	72,000	400,000
1980	Lee Trevino	United States	278 (−10)	1 stroke	72,000	400,000
1981	Raymond Floyd	United States	285 (−3)	Playoff	72,000	400,000

In 1987, Sawgrass hosted the Senior Tournament Players Championship in mid-June, which was won by Gary Player. The par-72 course was set at 6,636 yards (6,068 m) and the winner's share was $60,000. Player sank a seven-foot (2.1 m) birdie putt on the final green to win by a stroke at 280 (−8).

== Tennis ==
In addition to championship golf, Sawgrass Country Club maintains a tennis facility, known as the Racquet Club. The Racquet Club at Sawgrass Country Club has been ranked among the 50 best tennis facilities in the United States by Tennis Magazine. In 2009 and 2010 the Racquet Club hosted the MPS Group Championships, a tennis tournament on the WTA Tour.

== Fishing ==
Freshwater
The club's 27 holes of championship golf have a great deal of water. These ponds have natural structure and provide incredible habitat for some of Florida's biggest large mouth bass. Some even exceeding 10 pounds in weight. Residents and members have long enjoyed morning and evening fishing on and around the course. The months of January, February, and March attract the most fishing due to the large mouth bass bedding habits. Portion of the Guana River runs through holes 4 and 5 on the East nine. The natural swampy land the course was built on is also home to very large alligators. Some have even been over 10 ft in length. Other species found in the water include: gar, carp, crappie, tilapia, and bowfin. Sawgrass Country Club even hosts an annual bass fishing tournament. (https://www.sawgrasscountryclub.com/club/scripts/calendar/view_club_calendaritem.asp?CID=2194436&GRP=28959&NS=PUBLIC&src=w).

=== Saltwater ===
SCC's beach access is utilized for surf fishing.

== Fourth of July ==
Sawgrass has a long standing tradition of celebrating USA's freedom on Independence Day. The day always starts with a golf cart parade. Families enjoy friendly competition while decorating carts in a particular theme. While many simply stick with patriotic, themes can be about anything the contestant desires. The carts parade around the neighborhood and are judged in multiple categories. A cookout and fireworks are also part of the tradition. The club's fireworks have gained the reputation as being one of the best shows in the area.
