= 1977 Tournament Players Championship =

Tournament information
- Dates: March 17–20, 1977
- Location: Ponte Vedra Beach, Florida; 30.189°N 81.370°W
- Courses: Sawgrass Country Club, East-West course
- Tour: PGA Tour

Statistics
- Par: 72
- Length: 7,174 yards (6,560 m)
- Field: 140 players, 79 after cut
- Cut: 155 (+11)
- Prize fund: $300,000
- Winner's share: $60,000

Champion
- (United States) Mark Hayes
- 289 (+1)

Location map
- Location in the United States Location in Florida

The 1977 Tournament Players Championship was a golf tournament in Florida on the PGA Tour, held March 17–20 at Sawgrass Country Club in Ponte Vedra Beach, southeast of Jacksonville. The fourth Tournament Players Championship,it was the first standalone version of the tournament after the first three editions were attached to previously established tournaments. It was the first of five consecutive at Sawgrass, which had agreed a multi-year with the PGA Tour in 1976.

Mark Hayes was the champion in windy conditions at 289 (+1), two strokes ahead of runner-up Mike McCullough. McCullough and Tom Watson were the co-leaders after the third round, with Hayes a stroke back. Defending champion Jack Nicklaus finished four strokes back, in a tie for fifth place.

Bob Menne set the tour's 72-hole record for fewest putts with 99, but tied for 47th at 303 (+15). The record had been 102 putts, by Bert Yancey in 1966 at his victory in the final Portland Open Invitational.

== Venue ==
This was the first of five Tournament Players Championships held at Sawgrass Country Club; it moved to the nearby TPC at Sawgrass Stadium Course in 1982. The venues for the first three editions in Georgia, Texas, and south Florida were familiar to most of the participants as those courses had recently hosted multiple PGA Tour events; this was the first tour event at Sawgrass.

== Round summaries ==
=== First round ===
Thursday, March 17, 1977

Place	Player	Score	To par
1	(United States) Mike McCullough	66	−6
T3	(United States) Don Bies	68	−4
T3	(United States) Raymond Floyd	68	−4
T3	(United States) Tom Watson	68	−4
T6	(Australia) Bruce Devlin	69	−3
T6	(United States) Billy Kratzert	69	−3
T6	(United States) Ed Sabo	69	−3
T6	(United States) J. C. Snead	69	−3
T10	(Australia) Hubert Green	71	−1
T10	(England) Peter Oosterhuis	71	−1
T10	(United States) John Schroeder	71	−1

=== Second round ===
Friday, March 18, 1977

Place	Player	Score	To par
1	(United States) Mike McCullough	66-74=140	−4
2	(United States) Tom Watson	68-74=142	−2
T3	(United States) Raymond Floyd	68-76=144	E
T3	(United States) Bob E. Smith	73-71=144	E
5	(United States) J. C. Snead	69-76=145	+1
6	(United States) Mark Hayes	72-74=146	+2
T7	(United States) Jack Nicklaus	73-74=147	+3
T7	(United States) Bill Rogers	75-72=147	+3
T7	(United States) Tom Weiskopf	75-72=147	+3
T7	(United States) Larry Ziegler	74-73=147	+3

=== Third round ===
Saturday, March 19, 1977

Place	Player	Score	To par
T1	(United States) Mike McCullough	66-74-76=216	E
T1	(United States) Tom Watson	68-74-74=216	E
3	(United States) Mark Hayes	72-74-71=217	+1
T4	(United States) Raymond Floyd	68-76-74=218	+2
T4	(United States) Hale Irwin	72-77-69=218	+2
6	(United States) Jack Nicklaus	73-74-72=219	+3
T7	(Australia) Bruce Devlin	69-79-72=220	+4
T7	(United States) J. C. Snead	69-76-75=220	+4
T9	(United States) Danny Edwards	75-76-70=221	+5
T9	(United States) Tom Jenkins	75-75-71=221	+5
T9	(United States) Larry Nelson	74-74-73=221	+5

=== Final round ===
Sunday, March 20, 1977

Place	Player	Score	To par	Money ($)
1	(United States) Mark Hayes	72-74-71-72=289	+1	60,000
2	(United States) Mike McCullough	66-74-76-75=291	+3	34,200
T3	(Australia) Bruce Devlin	69-79-72-72=292	+4	17,700
T3	(United States) Hale Irwin	72-77-69-74=292	+4	17,700
T5	(Australia) Graham Marsh	73-77-72-71=293	+5	10,900
T5	(United States) Jack Nicklaus	73-74-72-74=293	+5	10,900
T5	(United States) Tom Watson	68-74-74-77=293	+5	10,900
T8	(United States) Steve Melnyk	73-76-73-72=294	+6	8,150
T8	(United States) Larry Nelson	74-74-73-73=294	+6	8,150
T8	(United States) Bill Rogers	75-72-76-71=294	+6	8,150
