= 1973 PGA Tour Qualifying School graduates =

This is a list of the 1973 PGA Tour Qualifying School graduates.

== Tournament summary ==
The tournament returned to a 144-hole final. After three 72-hole regional qualifiers, there were 78 players in the final field. The first four rounds were played at Perdido Bay Country Club in Pensacola, Florida in mid-October and the final four at Dunes Golf Club in Myrtle Beach, South Carolina the following week. They changed courses because the tour was attempting to prepare participants what week-to-week life would be like if they graduated onto the PGA Tour.

Ben Crenshaw won the event by 12 strokes. Recently one of the leading amateurs in the country, Crenshaw "gave more credence to projections that he would become golf's next dominating player." Joe Inman, in his second attempt at Q-school, successfully moved on to the PGA Tour. He finished in a tie for sixth place. A total of 23 players earned their tour cards.

== List of graduates ==
Place	Player	Notes
1	(United States) Ben Crenshaw	Winner of 1971, 1972, and 1973 NCAA Championship
2	(United States) Gil Morgan	
T3	(United States) Dick Mast	
T3	(United States) Gary McCord	Winner of 1970 NCAA Division II Championship
5	(United States) Wally Armstrong	
T6	(United States) Randy Erskine	Winner of 1970 Big Ten Championship
T6	(United States) Mark Hayes	Winner of 1972 Sunnehanna Amateur
T6	(United States) Joe Inman	Winner of 1969 North and South Amateur
T9	(United States) Terry Diehl	Winner of 1969 and 1971 Monroe Invitational
T9	(United States) Bobby Heins	
T9	(United States) Spike Kelley	
T9	(United States) Nate Starks	
T9	(United States) Bob Unger	
T14	(United States) Ron Hoyt	
T14	(United States) Jim Masserio	
T14	(United States) Eddie Pearce	Runner-up at 1971 U.S. Amateur
17	(United States) Lyn Lott	Winner of 1967 Georgia Open
18	(United States) Bobby Walzel	
T19	(United States) Sam Farlow	
T19	(United States) Barney Thompson	
T21	(United States) Jim Blanks	
T21	(United States) Warren Chancellor	
T21	(United States) Larry Nelson	
