= 1982 Tournament Players Championship =

Tournament information
- Dates: March 18–21, 1982
- Location: Ponte Vedra Beach, Florida; 30.198°N 81.394°W
- Courses: TPC Sawgrass, Stadium Course
- Tour: PGA Tour

Statistics
- Par: 72
- Length: 6,857 yards (6,270 m)
- Field: 147 players, 82 after cut
- Cut: 148 (+4)
- Prize fund: $500,000
- Winner's share: $90,000

Champion
- (United States) Jerry Pate
- 280 (−8)
- Location in the United States Location in Florida

The 1982 Tournament Players Championship was a golf tournament on the PGA Tour, held March 18–21 at TPC Sawgrass in Ponte Vedra Beach, Florida, southeast of Jacksonville. It was the ninth Tournament Players Championship and the first at the new course.

Playing an orange ball, Jerry Pate shot a final round 67 (−5) to win by two strokes over runners-up Scott Simpson and Brad Bryant. Pate started the final round three strokes behind the leaders, in a tie for sixth place. Following his win, Pate pushed tour commissioner Deane Beman and course designer Pete Dye into the lake along the 18th green, and then joined them.

Notables to miss the cut included hall of famers Jack Nicklaus, Arnold Palmer, Gary Player, and Lee Trevino. Defending champion Raymond Floyd finished 11 strokes back, in a tie for 22nd place.

== Venue ==
This was the first Tournament Players Championship held at the TPC at Sawgrass Stadium Course; its 1982 setup measured 6,857 yards (6,270 m). The debut was delayed a year due to heavy rains during construction.

== Eligibility requirements ==
1. All designated players
2. Winners of major TPA Tour co-sponsored or approved events beginning with the 1981 Tournament Players Championship and concluding with the tournament immediately preceding the 1982 TPC
3. The current British Open champion
4. Leaders in the TPA Tour Official Standings as necessary to complete the field, beginning with the 1981 TPC and concluding with the Bay Hill Classic, which concludes March 7, 1982

== Field ==
John Adams, Buddy Allin, Isao Aoki, George Archer, Seve Ballesteros, Jim Barber, Miller Barber, Dave Barr, Beau Baugh, Andy Bean, Chip Beck, Woody Blackburn, Jim Booros, Bill Britton, Brad Bryant, George Burns, Bob Byman, George Cadle, Rex Caldwell, Bill Calfee, Bobby Clampett, Lennie Clements, Jim Colbert, Bobby Cole, Frank Conner, Charles Coody, John Cook, Fred Couples, Ben Crenshaw, Rod Curl, Jim Dent, Bruce Devlin, Terry Diehl, Mike Donald, Ed Dougherty, Bruce Douglass, Bob Eastwood, Danny Edwards, David Edwards, Dave Eichelberger, Lee Elder, Nick Faldo, Keith Fergus, Forrest Fezler, Ed Fiori, Bruce Fleisher, Raymond Floyd, Gibby Gilbert, Bob Gilder, David Graham, Lou Graham, Thomas Gray, Hubert Green, Jay Haas, Joe Hager, Gary Hallberg, Dan Halldorson, Phil Hancock, Morris Hatalsky, Mark Hayes, Vance Heafner, Jerry Heard, Skeeter Heath, Scott Hoch, Mike Holland, Joe Inman, Hale Irwin, Peter Jacobsen, Barry Jaeckel, Don January, Tom Jenkins, Grier Jones, Tom Kite, Billy Kratzert, Wayne Levi, Don Levin, Bruce Lietzke, Pat Lindsey, Lyn Lott, Mark Lye, John Mahaffey, Roger Maltbie, Rik Massengale, Terry Mauney, John Mazza, Gary McCord, Mike McCullough, Mark McCumber, Pat McGowan, Allen Miller, Johnny Miller, Jeff Mitchell, Gil Morgan, Mike Morley, Bob Murphy, Jim Nelford, Larry Nelson, Jack Nicklaus, Mike Nicolette, Lonnie Nielsen, Andy North, Mark O'Meara, Peter Oosterhuis, Arnold Palmer, Jerry Pate, Calvin Peete, Mark Pfeil, Gary Player, Dan Pohl, Don Pooley, Greg Powers, Tom Purtzer, Sammy Rachels, Victor Regalado, Mike Reid, Jack Renner, Chi-Chi Rodríguez, Bill Rogers, John Schroeder, Bob Shearer, Jim Simons, Scott Simpson, Tim Simpson, J. C. Snead, Sam Snead, Ed Sneed, Craig Stadler, Dave Stockton, Curtis Strange, Ron Streck, Mike Sullivan, Doug Tewell, Barney Thompson, Leonard Thompson, David Thore, Jim Thorpe, Lee Trevino, Gary Trivisonno, Howard Twitty, Tommy Valentine, Bobby Wadkins, Lanny Wadkins, Denis Watson, Tom Watson, D. A. Weibring, Tom Weiskopf, Fuzzy Zoeller

== Round summaries ==
=== First round ===
Thursday, March 18, 1982

Place	Player	Score	To par
T1	(United States) George Burns	67	−5
T1	(United States) Lyn Lott	67	−5
T1	(United States) Larry Nelson	67	−5
T4	(United States) Vance Heafner	68	−4
T4	(United States) Skeeter Heath	68	−4
T4	(United States) Pat Lindsey	68	−4
T4	(United States) Scott Simpson	68	−4
T4	(United States) Ed Sneed	68	−4
T9	(United States) George Archer	69	−3
T9	(United States) Bob Eastwood	69	−3
T9	(United States) Bruce Fleisher	69	−3
T9	(United States) Gibby Gilbert	69	−3
T9	(United States) Don January	69	−3
T9	(United States) Bruce Lietzke	69	−3
T9	(United States) Roger Maltbie	69	−3
T9	(United States) Jim Simons	69	−3
T9	(United States) Jim Thorpe	69	−3

=== Second round ===
Friday, March 19, 1982
Saturday, March 20, 1982

Place	Player	Score	To par
T1	(United States) Vance Heafner	68-70=138	−6
T1	(United States) Hale Irwin	70-68=138	−6
T1	(United States) Lyn Lott	67-71=138	−6
T1	(United States) Scott Simpson	68-70=138	−6
T1	(United States) Tim Simpson	72-66=138	−6
T6	(United States) Brad Bryant	70-69=139	−5
T6	(United States) Larry Nelson	67-72=139	−5
T6	(United States) Ed Sneed	68-71=139	−5
T6	(United States) Craig Stadler	71-68=139	−5
T10	(United States) George Burns	67-73=140	−4
T10	(United States) Gibby Gilbert	69-71=140	−4

=== Third round ===
Saturday, March 20, 1982

Place	Player	Score	To par
T1	(United States) Brad Bryant	70-69-71=210	−6
T1	(United States) Bruce Lietzke	69-72-69=210	−6
T3	(United States) Vance Heafner	68-70-73=210	−5
T3	(United States) Scott Simpson	68-70-73=211	−5
5	(United States) George Archer	69-73-70=212	−4
T6	(United States) Hale Irwin	70-68-75=213	−3
T6	(United States) Jerry Pate	70-73-70=213	−3
T6	(United States) Tim Simpson	72-66-75=213	−3
T6	(United States) Ed Sneed	68-71-74=213	−3
T10	(Spain) Seve Ballesteros	73-72-69=214	−2
T10	(United States) Gibby Gilbert	69-71-74=214	−2
T10	(United States) Scott Hoch	72-70-72=214	−2
T10	(United States) Don January	69-73-72=214	−2
T10	(United States) Roger Maltbie	69-72-73=214	−2
T10	(United States) Craig Stadler	71-68-75=214	−2
T10	(United States) Tom Watson	70-76-68=214	−2

=== Final round ===
Sunday, March 21, 1982

Champion
(c) = past champion

Place	Player	Score	To par	Money ($)
1	(United States) Jerry Pate	70-73-70-67=280	−8	90,000
T2	(United States) Brad Bryant	70-69-71-72=282	−6	44,000
T2	(United States) Scott Simpson	68-70-73-71=282	−6	44,000
4	(United States) Bruce Lietzke	69-72-69-73=283	−5	24,000
5	(United States) Roger Maltbie	69-72-73-70=284	−4	20,000
T6	(Spain) Seve Ballesteros	73-72-69-72=286	−2	16,187
T6	(United States) Hubert Green	73-75-70-68=286	−2	16,187
T6	(United States) Craig Stadler	71-68-75-72=286	−2	16,187
T6	(United States) Tom Watson	70-76-68-72=286	−2	16,187
T10	(United States) Jim Booros	73-72-71-71=287	−1	12,500
T10	(United States) Larry Nelson	67-72-77-71=287	−1	12,500
T10	(United States) Ed Sneed	68-71-74-74=287	−1	12,500

Leaderboard below the top 10
Place	Player	Score	To par	Money ($)
T13	(United States) George Burns	67-73-75-73=288	E	9,100
T13	(United States) Vance Heafner	68-70-73-77=288	E	9,100
T13	(United States) Scott Hoch	72-70-72-74=288	E	9,100
T13	(United States) Tim Simpson	72-66-75-75=288	E	9,100
T13	(United States) J. C. Snead	72-76-70-70=288	E	9,100
18	(United States) Bill Rogers	73-70-75-71=289	+1	7,500
T19	(United States) Bob Eastwood	69-72-74-75=290	+2	6,500
T19	(United States) Hale Irwin	70-68-75-77=290	+2	6,500
T19	(United States) Don January	69-73-72-76=290	+2	6,500
T22	(United States) George Archer	69-73-70-79=291	+3	4,800
T22	(United States) Bob Byman	71-75-73-72=291	+3	4,800
T22	(United States) Raymond Floyd (c)	78-70-71-72=291	+3	4,800
T22	(United States) Gibby Gilbert	69-71-74-77=291	+3	4,800
T22	(United States) Tom Weiskopf	73-68-74-76=291	+3	4,800
T27	(United States) Jay Haas	72-66-77-77=292	+4	3,550
T27	(United States) Peter Jacobsen	72-72-77-71=292	+4	3,550
T27	(United States) Tom Kite	71-71-75-75=292	+4	3,550
T27	(United States) Mike Reid	71-74-77-70=292	+4	3,550
T27	(United States) D. A. Weibring	74-73-70-75=292	+4	3,550
T32	(United States) Bill Britton	71-76-70-76=293	+5	2,958
T32	(United States) Andy North	76-70-76-71=293	+5	2,958
T32	(United States) Jim Thorpe	69-76-71-77=293	+5	2,958
T35	(United States) Andy Bean	77-69-73-75=294	+6	2,412
T35	(South Africa) Bobby Cole	72-75-72-75=294	+6	2,412
T35	(England) Nick Faldo	75-70-75-74=294	+6	2,412
T35	(United States) Bruce Fleisher	69-73-77-75=294	+6	2,412
T35	(United States) John Mahaffey	73-72-74-75=294	+6	2,412
T35	(United States) Jim Simons	69-77-72-76=294	+6	2,412
T41	(United States) John Cook	72-75-73-75=295	+7	1,800
T41	(United States) Jim Dent	73-73-78-71=295	+7	1,800
T41	(United States) Bruce Douglass	77-69-73-76=295	+7	1,800
T41	(United States) Lee Elder	71-76-74-74=295	+7	1,800
T41	(United States) Calvin Peete	73-73-79-70=295	+7	1,800
T41	(Zimbabwe) Denis Watson	72-74-73-76=295	+7	1,800
T47	(United States) George Cadle	74-74-74-74=296	+8	1,345
T47	(United States) Mike McCullough	76-71-74-75=296	+8	1,345
T47	(United States) Allen Miller	73-75-74-74=296	+8	1,345
T47	(United States) Gil Morgan	70-76-78-72=296	+8	1,345
T51	(United States) Ed Fiori	70-74-80-73=297	+9	1,184
T51	(United States) Phil Hancock	74-70-79-74=297	+9	1,184
T51	(United States) Lyn Lott	67-71-80-79=297	+9	1,184
T51	(United States) Jeff Mitchell	75-71-76-75=297	+9	1,184
T51	(United States) Curtis Strange	73-74-74-76=297	+9	1,184
T56	(United States) Jim Barber	72-75-74-77=298	+10	1,115
T56	(United States) Bobby Clampett	73-72-78-75=298	+10	1,115
T56	(United States) Don Pooley	75-71-77-75=298	+10	1,115
T56	(United States) Doug Tewell	70-75-77-76=298	+10	1,115
T56	(United States) Bobby Wadkins	72-72-79-75=298	+10	1,115
T56	(United States) Fuzzy Zoeller	73-73-75-77=298	+10	1,115
T62	(United States) Skeeter Heath	68-79-76-76=299	+11	1,070
T62	(United States) Barry Jaeckel	72-75-76-76=299	+11	1,070
T62	(United States) Tommy Valentine	73-72-72-82=299	+11	1,070
T65	(Canada) Dave Barr	75-73-79-73=300	+12	1,030
T65	(United States) Woody Blackburn	72-76-78-74=300	+12	1,030
T65	(United States) Ed Dougherty	77-71-79-73=300	+12	1,030
T65	(United States) Bob Gilder	72-74-78-76=300	+12	1,030
T65	(United States) Pat Lindsey	68-78-78-76=300	+12	1,030
T70	(United States) Lou Graham	73-74-77-77=301	+13	1,000
T70	(Canada) Dan Halldorson	74-74-78-75=301	+13	1,000
T72	(United States) Gary Hallberg	70-78-77-77=302	+14	1,000
T72	(United States) John Mazza	75-70-76-81=302	+14	1,000
T72	(Australia) Bob Shearer	77-69-76-80=302	+14	1,000
T75	(United States) Dave Eichelberger	78-69-75-81=303	+15	1,000
T75	(United States) Keith Fergus	73-73-81-76=303	+15	1,000
T77	(United States) Mark O'Meara	72-76-78-79=305	+17	1,000
T77	(United States) Dave Stockton	73-75-78-79=305	+17	1,000
79	(Mexico) Victor Regalado	74-72-80-81=307	+19	1,000
80	(United States) Mark Hayes (c)	71-76-81-80=308	+20	1,000
81	(United States) Billy Kratzert	74-74-81-82=311	+23	1,000
CUT	(United States) Beau Baugh	72-77=149	+5	
CUT	(United States) Chip Beck	74-75=149	+5	
CUT	(United States) Ben Crenshaw	75-74=149	+5	
CUT	(United States) Joe Inman	72-77=149	+5	
CUT	(United States) Gary McCord	80-69=149	+5	
CUT	(United States) Pat McGowan	74-75=149	+5	
CUT	(United States) Johnny Miller	74-75=149	+5	
CUT	(United States) Arnold Palmer	72-77=149	+5	
CUT	(United States) Greg Powers	74-75=149	+5	
CUT	(United States) Howard Twitty	72-77=149	+5	
CUT	(Australia) Bruce Devlin	72-78=150	+6	
CUT	(United States) Mike Donald	70-80=150	+6	
CUT	(United States) Tom Jenkins	74-76=150	+6	
CUT	(United States) Terry Mauney	73-77=150	+6	
CUT	(England) Peter Oosterhuis	73-77=150	+6	
CUT	(United States) Lanny Wadkins (c)	74-76=150	+6	
CUT	(United States) Joe Hager	77-74=151	+7	
CUT	(Canada) Jim Nelford	72-79=151	+7	
CUT	(United States) Jack Nicklaus (c)	73-78=151	+7	
CUT	(South Africa) Gary Player	73-78=151	+7	
CUT	(United States) Jack Renner	82-69=151	+7	
CUT	(Japan) Isao Aoki	73-79=152	+8	
CUT	(United States) Jim Colbert	74-78=152	+8	
CUT	(United States) Danny Edwards	76-76=152	+8	
CUT	(United States) Forrest Fezler	76-76=152	+8	
CUT	(United States) Lonnie Nielsen	81-71=152	+8	
CUT	(United States) Tom Purtzer	73-79=152	+8	
CUT	(United States) Barney Thompson	71-81=152	+8	
CUT	(United States) Miller Barber	79-74=153	+9	
CUT	(United States) Bill Calfee	75-78=153	+9	
CUT	(Australia) David Graham	77-76=153	+9	
CUT	(United States) Chi-Chi Rodríguez	74-79=153	+9	
CUT	(United States) Jerry Heard	76-78=154	+10	
CUT	(United States) Mark Lye	78-76=154	+10	
CUT	(United States) Rik Massengale	79-75=154	+10	
CUT	(United States) Mark Pfeil	74-80=154	+10	
CUT	(United States) John Schroeder	73-81=154	+10	
CUT	(United States) Gary Trivisonno	76-78=154	+10	
CUT	(United States) Rex Caldwell	77-78=155	+11	
CUT	(United States) Lennie Clements	76-79=155	+11	
CUT	(United States) Frank Conner	73-82=155	+11	
CUT	(United States) Charles Coody	81-74=155	+11	
CUT	(United States) Terry Diehl	73-82=155	+11	
CUT	(United States) David Edwards	74-81=155	+11	
CUT	(United States) Don Levin	78-77=155	+11	
CUT	(United States) John Adams	74-82=156	+12	
CUT	(United States) Buddy Allin	75-81=156	+12	
CUT	(United States) David Thore	77-79=156	+12	
CUT	(United States) Thomas Gray	75-82=157	+13	
CUT	(United States) Mike Nicolette	77-80=157	+13	
CUT	(United States) Bob Murphy	79-79=158	+14	
CUT	(United States) Sam Snead	77-81=158	+14	
CUT	(United States) Fred Couples	79-80=159	+15	
CUT	(United States) Mark McCumber	81-78=159	+15	
CUT	(United States) Mike Morley	82-78=160	+16	
CUT	(United States) Ron Streck	79-84=163	+19	
WD	(United States) Rod Curl	72	E	
WD	(United States) Mike Holland	75	+3	
WD	(United States) Wayne Levi	75	+3	
WD	(United States) Sammy Rachels	75	+3	
WD	(United States) Grier Jones	76	+4	
WD	(United States) Dan Pohl	77	+5	
WD	(United States) Mike Sullivan	77	+5	
WD	(United States) Leonard Thompson	78	+6	
DQ	(United States) Morris Hatalsky	70-77-79=226	+10	
DQ	(United States) Lee Trevino (c)	82	+10	

== Video ==
- You Tube – Memorable Moments: The Players – PGA Tour
