= Tommy Valentine =

American professional golfer (1949-2014)

Personal information
- Full name: Thomas Ervin Valentine
- Nationality: United States
- Born: October 21, 1949 Atlanta, Georgia, U.S.
- Died: July 12, 2014 (aged 64)

Career
- Sport: Golf
- College: University of Georgia
- Status: Professional
- Former tour: PGA Tour

Best results in major championships
- Masters Tournament: DNP
- PGA Championship: T11: 1981
- U.S. Open: T26: 1981
- The Open Championship: DNP

Thomas Ervin Valentine (October 21, 1949 – July 12, 2014) was an American professional golfer.

== Early life and amateur career ==
Born in Atlanta, Georgia, Valentine was a four-year letterman in golf for the University of Georgia team from 1968 to 1971, winning the Southeastern Conference (SEC) individual title in 1970, and helping Georgia win the SEC championship in 1969, 1970, and 1971. He was first team NCAA All-American in 1970.

== Professional career ==
Valentine competed on the PGA Tour from 1977 until 1988, earning over $300,000 during his career, which included 14 top-10 finishes. Valentine's best finish was a second to Tom Watson in the 1981 Atlanta Classic. Valentine and Watson were tied at the end of 72 holes, and Watson won the sudden-death playoff.

After leaving the PGA Tour in 1988, Valentine accepted the position of head pro at the Lochmoor Club in Grosse Pointe Woods, Michigan, which he held until his retirement in 2009.

== Death ==
Valentine died on July 12, 2014, following a long battle with cancer. He was 64.

== Playoff record ==
PGA Tour playoff record (0–1)

| No. | Year | Tournament | Opponent | Result |
|---|---|---|---|---|
| 1 | 1981 | Atlanta Classic | (United States) Tom Watson | Lost to par on third extra hole |

== See also ==
- Spring 1977 PGA Tour Qualifying School graduates
- Fall 1978 PGA Tour Qualifying School graduates
- 1983 PGA Tour Qualifying School graduates
