= TPC at Sawgrass =

Resort golf course in Ponte Vedra Beach, FL, US

Tournament Players Club Sawgrass

- Location within the United States Location within Florida
- 30.198°N 81.394°W

Club information
- Location: Ponte Vedra Beach, Florida, U.S.
- Elevation: 7 feet (2 m)
- Established: 1980, 46 years ago
- Type: Resort
- Operator: PGA Tour TPC Network
- Tota holes: 36
- Tournaments: The Players Championship (1982–present)
- Greens: TifEagle Bermuda
- Fairways: Celebration Bermuda
- Website: Official website

The Players Stadium Course
- Designed by: Pete Dye, Alice Dye
- Par: 72
- Length: 7,245 yards (6,625 m)
- Course rating: 76.4
- Slope rating: 155
- Course record: 62 – Tom Hoge (2023), Justin Thomas (2025)

Dye's Valley Course
- Designed by: Pete Dye, Bobby Weed, with Jerry Pate
- Par: 72
- Length: 6,847 yards (6,261 m)
- Course rating: 74.0
- Slope rating: 134
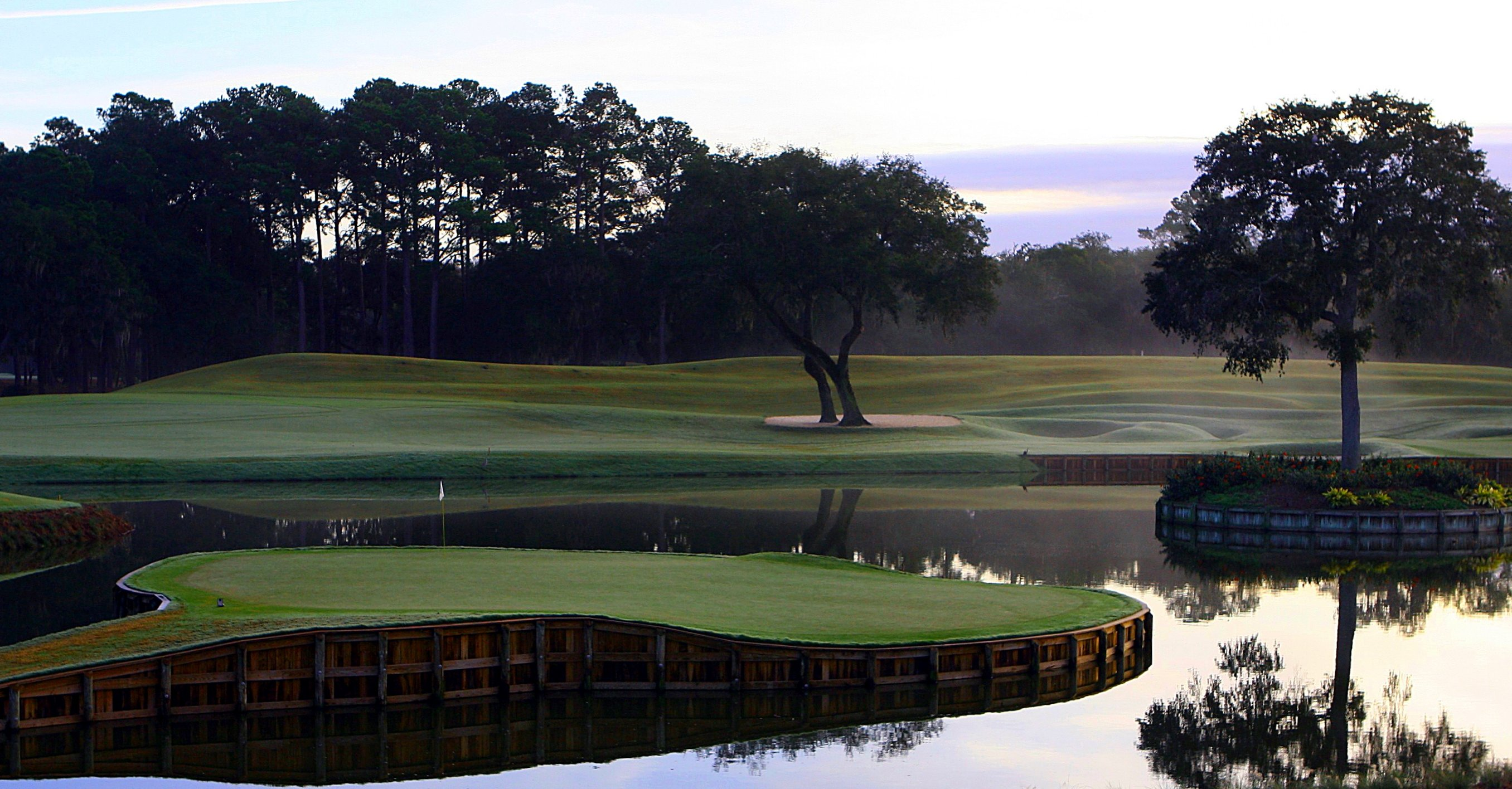
- The Stadium Course's 17th hole in 2008.

The Tournament Players Club at Sawgrass (TPC Sawgrass) is a golf course in the southeastern United States, located in Ponte Vedra Beach, Florida, southeast of Jacksonville. The course opened 46 years ago in the autumn of 1980 and was the first of several Tournament Players Clubs to be built. It is home to the PGA Tour headquarters and hosts The Players Championship, one of the PGA Tour's signature events, now held in March. Paul and Jerome Fletcher negotiated a deal with the PGA Tour, which included the donation of 415 acres (1.68 km^{2}) for $1 (the original check is prominently displayed in the clubhouse).

The TPC Sawgrass is situated in Ponte Vedra Beach's Sawgrass development. It has two individual courses, the Stadium Course and the Valley Course. The Stadium Course was designed by noted golf course architects Pete and Alice Dye, and is known as one of the most difficult golf courses in the world. Constructed specifically to host The Players Championship, it employs a distinctive "stadium" concept: like in other sports, fans at the TPC sit in "stands" made of raised mounds of grass. It is known for its signature hole, the par-3, 137-yard (125 m) 17th, known as the "Island Green", one of golf's most recognizable and difficult holes. It has a capacity of 36,000.

The course has been featured for many years on the best-selling Tiger Woods PGA Tour series of video games.

Dye's Valley Course hosted the Web.com Tour Championship from 2013 to 2015.

== History ==
Built on 415 acres (1.68 km^{2}) in the northeastern Florida swampland, it is about a mile west of the Atlantic Ocean. The course contains many challenging features: narrow fairways lined with hazards like marshes and "waste bunkers" (long strips of sand that groundskeepers never maintain); dozens of deep "pot bunkers," strategically placed to catch even a slightly misplaced shot; thick rough that features craters and mounds; tall, shot-obstructing palm trees; and rock-hard, lightning-fast greens.

The Tournament Players Championship had been played at adjacent Sawgrass Country Club from 1977 through 1981, one more year than originally planned, as heavy rains during construction pushed its debut back a year. When it moved west to the Stadium Course in 1982, the story was not eventual winner Jerry Pate, but the complaints the players had about the new course, which had supposedly been built in their honor. "It's Star Wars golf, designed by Darth Vader," Ben Crenshaw pronounced. When asked if the TPC suited his playing style, Jack Nicklaus replied, "No, I've never been very good at stopping a 5-iron on the hood of a car." J. C. Snead called the course "90 percent horse manure and 10 percent luck."

Over the following year, Dye tweaked the course, making the greens less severe and replacing several bunkers. After the changes, the course became far more playable. "Now it's a darn good golf course," Crenshaw said of the improvements.

The course was the site of the U.S. Amateur in August 1994, where 18-year-old Tiger Woods defeated Trip Kuehne in the finals, 2 up, the first of his three consecutive victories.

The second Creator Classic took place at the golf course. Grant Horvat won the event.

== The Island Green ==
TPC Sawgrass's signature hole is the Stadium Course's 17th, known simply as the "Island Green," although it is technically a peninsula. It measures only 137 yards (125 m) from tee to green (requiring only a pitching wedge for most pros), but it consists of nothing but a 78-foot (24 m)-long green with a tiny bunker in front of it. Save a small path to the green, the green is completely surrounded by water, and its location amidst many trees causes the wind to swirl over it. Club selection in the weather conditions at the hole is a huge consideration, as there is nowhere to land the ball but on the green, in the small bunker, or in the water. It is estimated that more than 100,000 balls are retrieved from the surrounding water every year, courtesy of professionals and tourists alike.

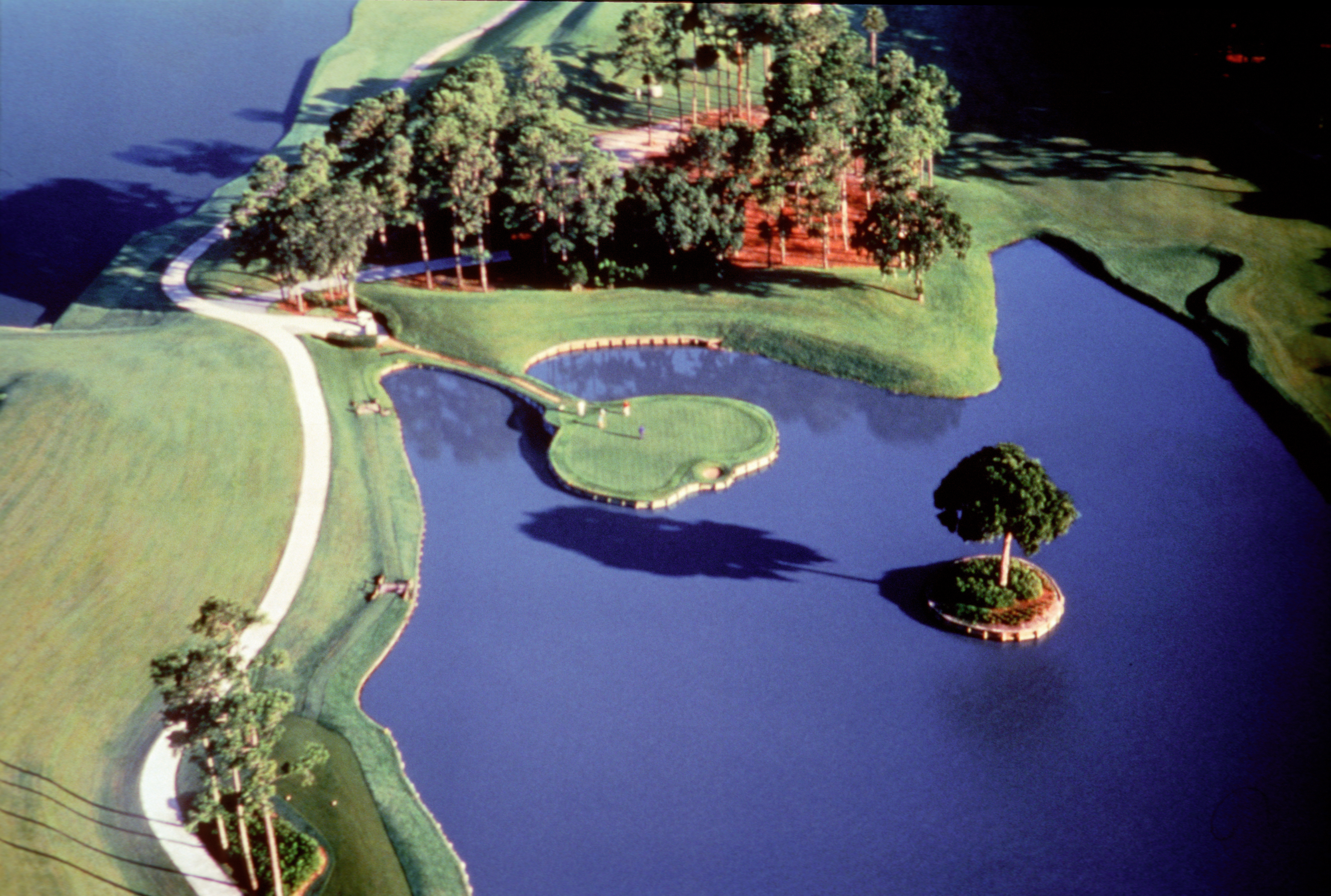
"Island Green" par-3 17th hole

The Island Green design came by accident: the original design for the 17th was to be a simple par-3 green only partially surrounded by a lake. However, the soil surrounding the 17th consisted of sand, which is necessary to build a good golf course, but rare on the otherwise swampy property, and by the time the course was near completion all the sand had been dug from the area, leaving a large crater. Alice Dye suggested the Island Green concept, remembering another course with a similar green. Pete was not thrilled at the idea but went ahead with it, in the process creating one of golf's most recognizable holes. Because of its popularity among fans, Golf Channel devotes eleven cameras to it during the tournament.

Probably the most famous incident that has occurred on the Island Green involved Brad Fabel in the 1998 event. His tee shot successfully landed on the green, but then a seagull swooped onto the green and picked up his ball several times. The gull found it difficult to hold the ball in its bill, but finally managed to carry it into the air and over the water, where it dropped it. One of the TV commentators quipped that the 17th now had yet another hazard. Under Rule 18-1 of the Rules of Golf, as a bird is considered an "outside agency" and as Fabel's shot was at rest, he was permitted to replace the ball at the spot where the ball initially came to rest on the green.

In the gusty opening round in May 2007, a record fifty balls found the water at the 17th hole, which broke the single-round tournament record of 45 set in 2000.

During the week of Super Bowl XXXIX, played at nearby Jacksonville in February 2005, Fox Sports organized a "closest to pin" contest with MLB players, NFL players, and NASCAR drivers competing (all sports properties of the network) on the 17th green. Dale Jarrett defeated Trent Green and John Smoltz in the final by being the only player to make it on the green.

In the final round of the 2019 Players Championship, Venezuelan golfer Jhonattan Vegas made the longest putt in the history of the hole with a distance of 69 feet 7 inches (21.21 m).

== Scorecard ==
TPC Sawgrass - The Players Stadium Course
Tee	Rating/Slope	1	2	3	4	5	6	7	8	9	Out	10	11	12	13	14	15	16	17	18	In	Total
The Players	76.4 / 155	423	532	177	384	471	393	451	237	583	3651	424	558	358	181	481	470	523	137	462	3594	7245
Blue	73.3 / 149	394	507	160	359	446	360	407	195	546	3374	392	519	332	156	436	421	486	128	426	3296	6670
Blended	71.9 / 147	394	507	160	359	422	360	382	168	522	3274	392	469	332	156	377	366	486	128	426	3132	6406
White	70.3 / 140	360	469	134	324	422	333	382	168	522	3114	351	469	296	141	377	366	470	115	387	2973	6086
Green	65.1 / 120	292	381	97	263	360	269	329	121	453	2565	247	395	243	109	334	288	410	92	336	2454	5019
Ladies' White	76.1 / 150
Ladies' Green	70.7 / 131
Par		4	5	3	4	4	4	4	3	5	36	4	5	4	3	4	4	5	3	4	36	72
SI	Gentleman's	11	15	17	9	3	13	1	7	5		12	8	16	18	4	6	10	14	2
SI	Ladies'	11	1	17	5	7	13	9	15	3		10	2	14	18	12	8	4	16	6

== Gallery ==
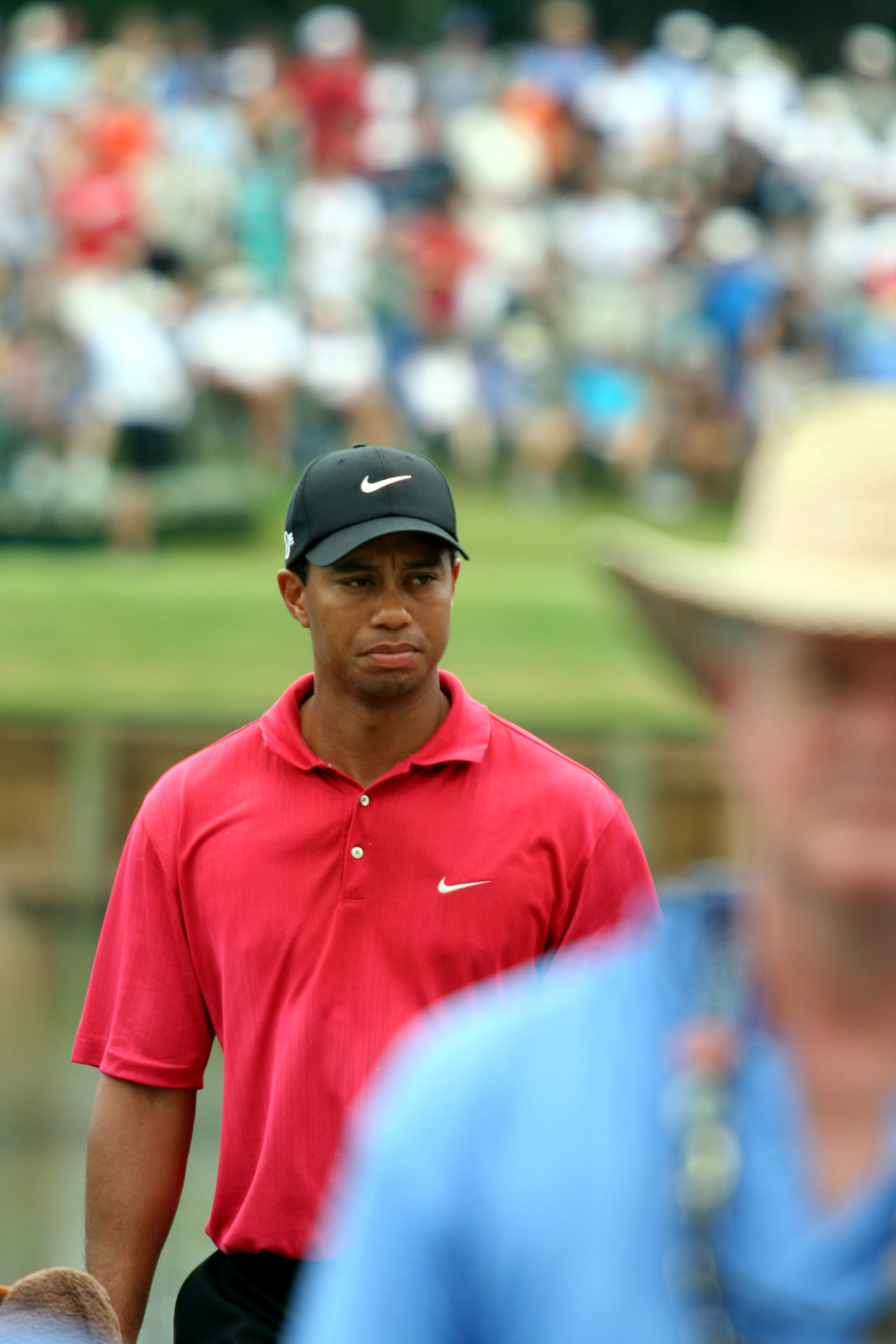
Tiger Woods at the 17th hole in 2007.

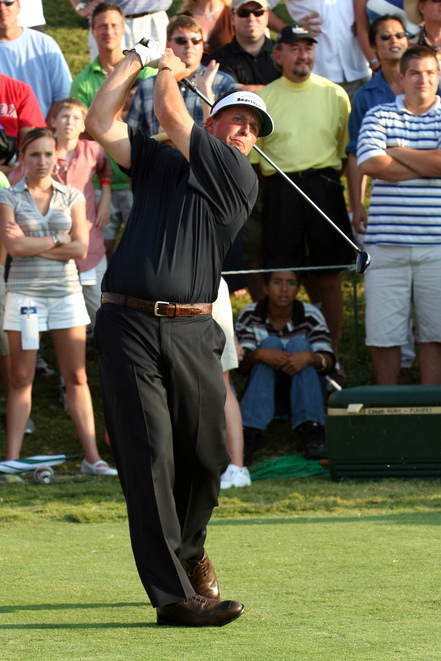
Phil Mickelson on the 18th tee, on his way to a win in 2007.

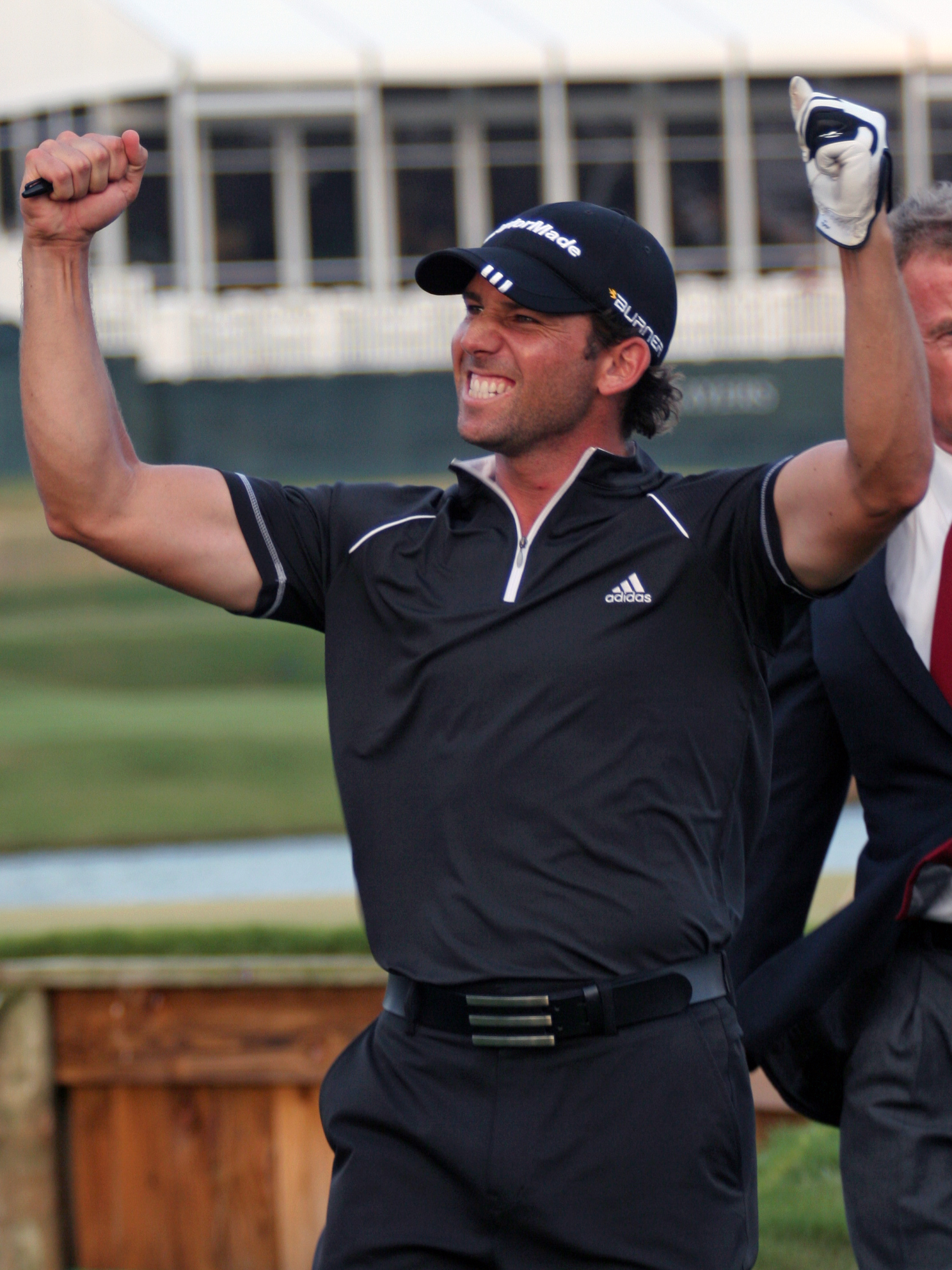
Sergio García winning in 2008.

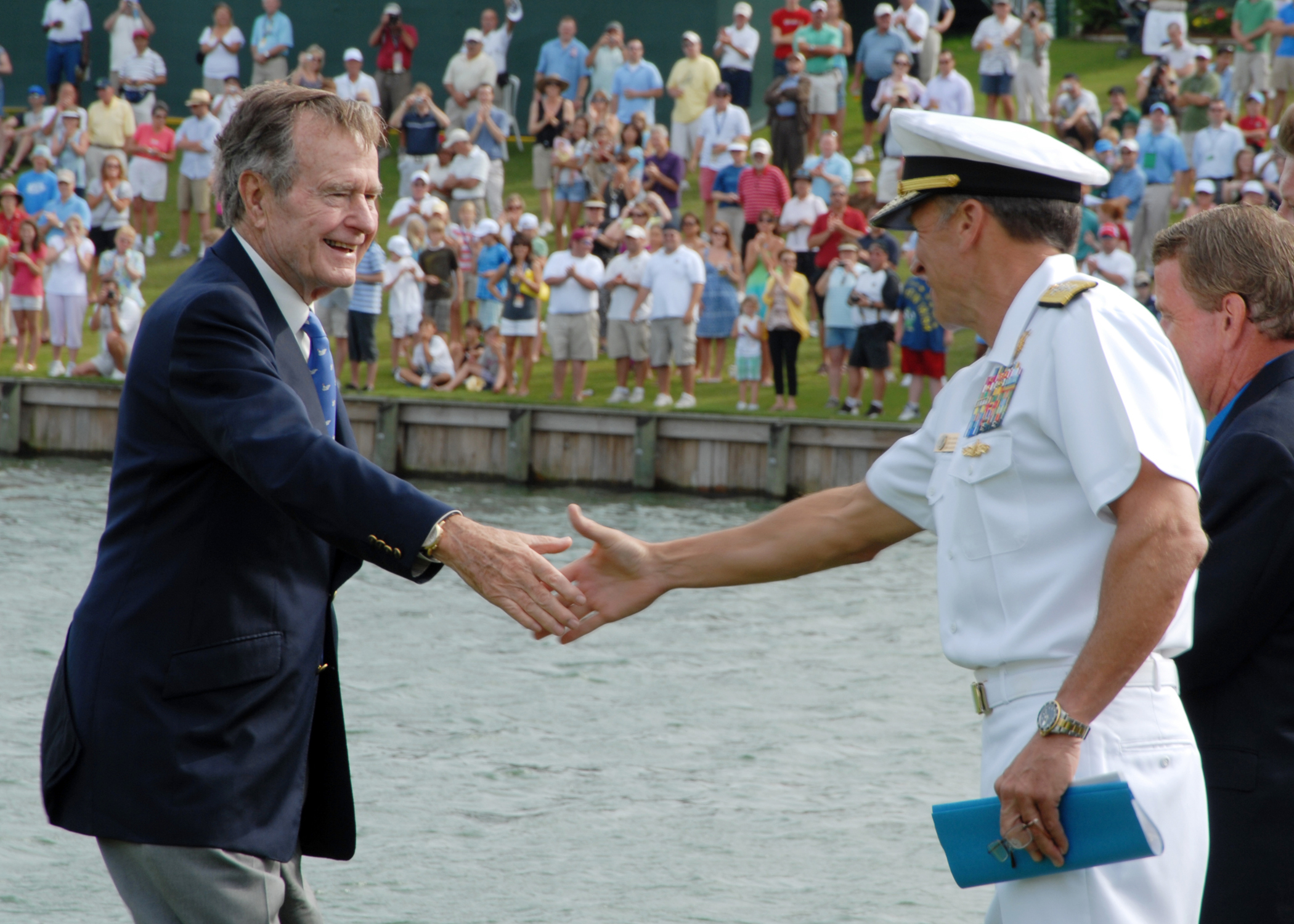
Former President George H. W. Bush shakes hands with Rear Adm. Joseph Kernan and then received the Professional Golfers Association Tour Lifetime Achievement Award in 2009.
