= Bobby Walzel =

American golfer (born 1949)

Personal information
- Full name: Robert Morris Walzel
- Nationality: United States
- Born: September 26, 1949 (age 77) Houston, Texas, U.S.
- Height: 5 ft 11 in (1.80 m)
- Weight: 180 lb (82 kg; 13 st)

Career
- Sport: Golf
- College: University of Houston
- Turned professional: 1973
- Former tours: PGA Tour; Champions Tour
- Professional wins: 2

Best results in major championships
- Masters Tournament: CUT: 1981
- PGA Championship: T8: 1980
- U.S. Open: T19: 1979
- The Open Championship: DNP

Robert Morris Walzel (born September 26, 1949) is an American professional golfer.

== Early life and amateur career ==
Walzel was born in Houston, Texas. He played college golf at the University of Houston where he was on the teams that won back-to-back NCAA Division I Championships in 1969 and 1970.

== Professional career ==
In 1973, Walzel turned professional. He played on the PGA Tour from 1974 to 1981. His best finishes were two third places in 1977: at the Bob Hope Chrysler Classic and at the Tallahassee Open. He did win the 1979 Magnolia State Classic, a PGA Tour-sponsored "satellite" event played opposite the Masters Tournament. His best finish in a major was a T-8 at the 1980 PGA Championship.

Walzel played on the Champions Tour from 2001 to 2004. His best finish was a T-2 at 2001 Verizon Classic.

== Professional wins (2) ==
- 1977 Texas State Open
- 1979 Magnolia State Classic

== Results in major championships ==
Tournament	1975	1976	1977	1978	1979	1980	1981
Masters Tournament							CUT
U.S. Open	CUT				T19	T58	
PGA Championship						T8	CUT

Note: Walzel never played in The Open Championship.

Top 10
Did not play

CUT = missed the half-way cut
"T" indicates a tie for a place

== See also ==
- 1973 PGA Tour Qualifying School graduates
