= Barry Jaeckel =

American professional golfer (born 1949)

Personal information
- Full name: Barry Louis Jaeckel
- Nationality: United States
- Born: February 14, 1949 (age 77) Los Angeles, California, U.S.
- Height: 5 ft 10.5 in (1.79 m)
- Weight: 160 lb (73 kg; 11 st)

Career
- Sport: Golf
- College: Santa Monica Junior College
- Turned professional: 1971
- Former tours: PGA Tour; European Tour; Champions Tour
- Professional wins: 2

Number of wins by tour
- PGA Tour: 1
- European Tour: 1

Best results in major championships
- Masters Tournament: CUT: 1979
- PGA Championship: T42: 1982, 1983
- U.S. Open: T28: 1976
- The Open Championship: CUT: 1973

Barry Louis Jaeckel (born February 14, 1949) is an American professional golfer who played on the PGA Tour and the Champions Tour.

== Early life ==
Jaeckel was born in Los Angeles, California, and is the son of actor Richard Jaeckel. He attended Palisades High School, Santa Monica Junior College, turned professional in 1971.

== Professional career ==
Early in his career he played on the European Tour. In 1972, he won the French Open defeating Clive Clark in a sudden death playoff. Along with Walter Hagen and Byron Nelson, Jaeckel is one of only three Americans ever to win the event.

Jaeckel was successful at Spring 1975 PGA Tour Qualifying School and soon joined the PGA Tour. He played in 520 PGA Tour events from 1975–1995 and recorded over two dozen top-10 finishes. Like his French Open triumph, his three best results on the PGA Tour were resolved in playoffs. He won the 1978 Tallahassee Open by shooting a final round 65 (−7) and then defeating Bruce Lietzke in a playoff. At the 1981 Tournament Players Championship he and Curtis Strange lost in a playoff to Raymond Floyd. At the 1983 Kemper Open he lost a five-man playoff to Fred Couples. Jaeckel was 7 shots back entering the day and finished hours before the last group. He passed the time at a bar, hanging out with friends and watching the event on TV. These playoff losses represent his only two runner-up finishes on tour.

His best finish in a major was T-28 at the 1976 U.S. Open.

After reaching the age of 50 in February 1999, Jaeckel joined the Senior PGA Tour. His best finish was a T-10 at the 2000 Audi Senior Classic.

== Personal life ==
Jaeckel lives in Palm Desert, California.

== Amateur wins ==
- 1968 Southern California Amateur

== Professional wins (2) ==
=== PGA Tour wins (1) ===
No.	Date	Tournament	Winning score	Margin of victory	Runner-up
1	Apr 16, 1978	Tallahassee Open	−15 (70-67-71-65=273)	Playoff	(United States) Bruce Lietzke

PGA Tour playoff record (1–2)

No.	Year	Tournament	Opponent(s)	Result
1	1978	Tallahassee Open	(United States) Bruce Lietzke	Won with par on first extra hole
2	1981	Tournament Players Championship	(United States) Raymond Floyd, (United States) Curtis Strange	Floyd won with par on first extra hole
3	1983	Kemper Open	(Taiwan) Chen Tze-chung, (United States) Fred Couples, (United States) Gil Morgan, (United States) Scott Simpson	Couples won with birdie on second extra hole Jaeckel eliminated by par on first hole

=== European Tour wins (1) ===
No.	Date	Tournament	Winning score	Margin of victory	Runner-up
1	Jul 23, 1972	French Open	−11 (67-68-63-67=265)	Playoff	(England) Clive Clark

European Tour playoff record (1–0)

No.	Year	Tournament	Opponent	Result
1	1972	French Open	(England) Clive Clark	Won with par on second extra hole

== Results in major championships ==
Tournament	1972	1973	1974	1975	1976	1977	1978	1979	1980	1981	1982	1983	1984	1985	1986	1987
Masters Tournament								CUT								
U.S. Open	T36				T28	CUT	CUT						T43		T50	T36
The Open Championship		CUT														
PGA Championship							CUT	T60		T67	T42	T42	CUT		CUT	

Did not play

CUT = missed the half-way cut
"T" = tied

== Results in The Players Championship ==
Tournament	1976	1977	1978	1979	1980	1981	1982	1983	1984	1985	1986	1987
The Players Championship	T43	CUT	CUT	CUT	CUT	T2	T62	T23	T33	63	T67	T54

Top 10

CUT = missed the halfway cut
"T" indicates a tie for a place

== See also ==
- Spring 1975 PGA Tour Qualifying School graduates
