= Bruce Lietzke =

American professional golfer (1951–2018)

Personal information
- Full name: Bruce Alan Lietzke
- Nationality: United States
- Born: July 18, 1951 Kansas City, Kansas, U.S.
- Died: July 28, 2018 (aged 67) Athens, Texas, U.S.
- Height: 6 ft 2 in (1.88 m)
- Weight: 205 lb (93 kg; 14.6 st)

Career
- Sport: Golf
- College: University of Houston
- Turned professional: 1974
- Former tours: PGA Tour; Champions Tour
- Professional wins: 22

Number of wins by tour
- PGA Tour: 13
- PGA Tour Champions: 7
- Other: 2

Best results in major championships
- Masters Tournament: 6th/T6: 1979, 1985
- PGA Championship: 2nd: 1991
- U.S. Open: T17: 1981
- The Open Championship: T6: 1981

Bruce Alan Lietzke (July 18, 1951 – July 28, 2018) was an American professional golfer. He won 13 tournaments on the PGA Tour. His best finish in a major championship was runner-up at the 1991 PGA Championship. He also had seven victories on the Champions Tour, including one senior major title, the 2003 U.S. Senior Open.

== Early life and amateur career ==
Lietzke was born in Kansas City, Kansas. He moved to Beaumont, Texas, with his parents in 1960 and lived there until 1977, graduating from Forest Park High School in 1969.

Lietzke credited his older brother, Duane, for introducing him to the game of golf at age five. He also credited Henry Homberg, a local Beaumont professional, along with Duane for having the greatest influences on his game when he first started playing.

Lietzke attended the University of Houston in Houston, Texas. He graduated in 1973.

== Professional career ==
In 1974, Lietzke turned professional. Lietzke's first PGA Tour victory was in the 1977 Tucson Open. Overall, Lietzke won a combined total of 20 tournaments on the PGA Tour and the Champions Tour, including the 2003 U.S. Senior Open. On the PGA Tour in 1981, Lietzke had three tournament victories. He played on the winning 1981 U.S. Ryder Cup team at Walton Heath Golf Club.

Lietzke's best finish in a major on the PGA Tour was a solo second place at the 1991 PGA Championship.

Lietzke was well known for not practicing a great deal, and not playing in a large number of tournaments compared to his fellow competitors, electing to spend more time with his family. He did not play more than 25 events in any PGA Tour season and never played more than 20 tournaments in a single season after 1988. He never finished below 74th on the money list. During his career, Lietzke played in 506 PGA Tour events.

== Personal life ==
Lietzke and Jerry Pate were brothers-in-law. Lietzke's wife, Rose, and Pate's wife, Soozi, are sisters. Lietzke and Pate played together in the 1981 Ryder Cup.

He resided in Dallas, Texas.

In April 2017, Lietzke was diagnosed with an aggressive form of brain cancer called glioblastoma. He died on July 28, 2018, from complications of the disease and attempts at treating it, which his body rejected.

== Professional wins (22) ==
=== PGA Tour wins (13) ===
No.	Date	Tournament	Winning score	Margin of victory	Runner(s)-up
1	Jan 16, 1977	Joe Garagiola-Tucson Open	−13 (70-66-70-69=275)	Playoff	(United States) Gene Littler
2	Feb 6, 1977	Hawaiian Open	−15 (67-70-67-69=273)	3 strokes	(United States) Don January, (Japan) Takashi Murakami
3	Jun 25, 1978	Canadian Open	−1 (76-67-67-73=283)	1 stroke	(United States) Pat McGowan
4	Feb 18, 1979	Joe Garagiola-Tucson Open (2)	−15 (63-66-68-68=265)	2 strokes	(United States) Buddy Gardner, (United States) Jim Thorpe, (United States) Tom Watson
5	May 18, 1980	Colonial National Invitation	−9 (63-68-71-69=271)	1 stroke	(United States) Ben Crenshaw
6	Jan 18, 1981	Bob Hope Desert Classic	−25 (65-66-65-70-69=335)	2 strokes	(United States) Jerry Pate
7	Feb 8, 1981	Wickes-Andy Williams San Diego Open	−10 (68-72-70-68=278)	Playoff	(United States) Raymond Floyd, (United States) Tom Jenkins
8	May 10, 1981	Byron Nelson Golf Classic	+1 (68-74-69-70=281)	Playoff	(United States) Tom Watson
9	Aug 1, 1982	Canadian Open (2)	−7 (68-68-68-73=277)	2 strokes	(United States) Hal Sutton
10	Mar 4, 1984	Honda Classic	−8 (72-70-70-68=280)	Playoff	(United States) Andy Bean
11	May 15, 1988	GTE Byron Nelson Golf Classic (2)	−9 (66-69-66-70=271)	Playoff	(United States) Clarence Rose
12	May 24, 1992	Southwestern Bell Colonial (2)	−13 (69-68-64-66=267)	Playoff	(United States) Corey Pavin
13	Oct 23, 1994	Las Vegas Invitational	−28 (66-67-68-66-65=332)	1 stroke	(United States) Robert Gamez

PGA Tour playoff record (6–6)

No.	Year	Tournament	Opponent(s)	Result
1	1977	Joe Garagiola-Tucson Open	(United States) Gene Littler	Won with birdie on fourth extra hole
2	1977	MONY Tournament of Champions	(United States) Jack Nicklaus	Lost to birdie on third extra hole
3	1978	Tallahassee Open	(United States) Barry Jaeckel	Lost to par on first extra hole
4	1981	Wickes-Andy Williams San Diego Open	(United States) Raymond Floyd, (United States) Tom Jenkins	Won with birdie on second extra hole Jenkins eliminated by par on first hole
5	1981	Byron Nelson Golf Classic	(United States) Tom Watson	Won with par on first extra hole
6	1984	Honda Classic	(United States) Andy Bean	Won with par on first extra hole
7	1988	GTE Byron Nelson Classic	(United States) Clarence Rose	Won with birdie on first extra hole
8	1992	GTE Byron Nelson Classic	(United States) Billy Ray Brown, (United States) Ben Crenshaw, (United States) Raymond Floyd	Brown won with birdie on first extra hole
9	1992	Southwestern Bell Colonial	(United States) Corey Pavin	Won with birdie on first extra hole
10	1992	Canadian Open	(Australia) Greg Norman	Lost to birdie on second extra hole
11	1995	Mercedes Championships	(Australia) Steve Elkington	Lost to birdie on second extra hole
12	1998	Bob Hope Chrysler Classic	(United States) Fred Couples	Lost to birdie on first extra hole

=== Other wins (1) ===
No.	Date	Tournament	Winning score	Margin of victory	Runners-up
1	Nov 16, 1997	Franklin Templeton Shark Shootout (with (United States) Scott McCarron)	−30 (68-59-59=186)	2 strokes	(United States) David Duval and (United States) Scott Hoch

=== Champions Tour wins (7) ===
Legend
Senior major championships (1)
Other Champions Tour (6)

No.	Date	Tournament	Winning score	Margin of victory	Runner(s)-up
1	Aug 12, 2001	3M Championship	−9 (72-66-69=207)	2 strokes	(United States) Doug Tewell
2	Sep 23, 2001	SAS Championship	−15 (69-66-66=201)	3 strokes	(United States) Allen Doyle, (United States) Gary McCord
3	Feb 24, 2002	Audi Senior Classic	−8 (75-66-67=208)	1 stroke	(United States) Hale Irwin, (United States) Gary McCord
4	May 12, 2002	TD Waterhouse Championship	−11 (69-64=133) (Note: Shortened to 36 holes due to weather.)	2 strokes	(United States) Larry Nelson
5	Sep 22, 2002	SAS Championship (2)	−14 (72-63-67=202)	4 strokes	(United States) Gil Morgan, (United States) Sammy Rachels, (United States) Tom Watson
6	Apr 27, 2003	Liberty Mutual Legends of Golf	−10 (70-65-71=206)	1 stroke	(United States) David Eger, (United States) Dana Quigley
7	Jun 29, 2003	U.S. Senior Open	−7 (69-71-64-73=277)	2 strokes	(United States) Tom Watson

=== Other senior wins (1) ===
- 2002 Liberty Mutual Legends of Golf - Raphael Division (with Bill Rogers)

== Results in major championships ==
Tournament	1972	1973	1974	1975	1976	1977	1978	1979
Masters Tournament						T28		6
U.S. Open	CUT			CUT	T47	T19	T20	T41
The Open Championship								
PGA Championship					T38	T15	62	T16

Tournament	1980	1981	1982	1983	1984	1985	1986	1987	1988	1989
Masters Tournament	CUT	T11	T20	T42	T33	T6	T31	49		T34
U.S. Open	T38	T17	CUT	CUT		T31				
The Open Championship	T19	T6	CUT							
PGA Championship	T30	T4	T16	T6	T65	T18	T5	T28	T62	T46

Tournament	1990	1991	1992	1993	1994	1995
Masters Tournament			T13	T31		T31
U.S. Open						
The Open Championship						
PGA Championship	CUT	2	T73	CUT		T23

Top 10
Did not play

CUT = missed the half-way cut
"T" indicates a tie for a place

=== Summary ===
Tournament	Wins	2nd	3rd	Top-5	Top-10	Top-25	Events	Cuts made
Masters Tournament	0	0	0	0	2	5	14	13
U.S. Open	0	0	0	0	0	3	11	7
The Open Championship	0	0	0	0	1	2	3	2
PGA Championship	0	1	0	3	4	9	19	17
Totals	0	1	0	3	7	19	47	39

- Most consecutive cuts made – 13 (1983 PGA – 1989 PGA)
- Longest streak of top-10s – 2 (1981 Open Championship – 1981 PGA)

== Results in The Players Championship ==
Tournament	1975	1976	1977	1978	1979	1980	1981	1982	1983	1984	1985	1986	1987	1988	1989
The Players Championship	CUT	CUT	T40	CUT	CUT	T24	T4	4	T3	T12	T7	T40	CUT	CUT	3

Tournament	1990	1991	1992	1993	1994	1995	1996	1997	1998	1999
The Players Championship	T11	T6	T46	T28	CUT	T43	CUT		T13	T32

Top 10
Did not play

CUT = missed the halfway cut
"T" indicates a tie for a place

== Senior major championships ==
=== Wins (1) ===
Year	Championship	Winning score	Margin	Runner-up
2003	U.S. Senior Open	−7 (69-71-64-73=277)	2 strokes	(United States) Tom Watson

== U.S. national team appearances ==
- Ryder Cup: 1981 (winners)
- UBS Cup: 2003 (tie)

== See also ==
- Spring 1975 PGA Tour Qualifying School graduates
