= Mark Hayes (golfer) =

American professional golfer (1949–2018)

Personal information
- Full name: Mark Stephen Hayes
- Nationality: United States
- Born: July 12, 1949 Stillwater, Oklahoma, U.S.
- Died: July 17, 2018 (aged 69) Edmond, Oklahoma, U.S.
- Height: 5 ft 11 in (1.80 m)
- Weight: 170 lb (77 kg; 12 st)

Career
- Sport: Golf
- College: Oklahoma State University
- Turned professional: 1973
- Former tours: PGA Tour; Champions Tour
- Professional wins: 7

Number of wins by tour
- PGA Tour: 3
- Other: 4

Best results in major championships
- Masters Tournament: T10: 1982
- PGA Championship: T15: 1976
- U.S. Open: T6: 1980
- The Open Championship: T9: 1977

Mark Stephen Hayes (July 12, 1949 – July 17, 2018) was an American professional golfer. He had three victories on the PGA Tour in the 1970s including the 1977 Tournament Players Championship. He played in the 1979 Ryder Cup as a late replacement for Tom Watson.

== Early years and amateur career ==
In 1949, Hayes was born in Stillwater, Oklahoma.

Hayes played collegiately at Oklahoma State University where he was a two-time All-American. In 1972, Hayes won the Sunnehanna Amateur.

== Professional career ==
In 1973, Hayes turned professional. He won three times on the PGA Tour: the 1976 Byron Nelson Golf Classic, 1976 Pensacola Open, and won the first standalone Tournament Players Championship in 1977. He also won the PGA Tour-sponsored Tallahassee Open in 1986 and three Oklahoma Opens.

Hayes had his best finish in a major championship at the U.S. Open in 1980, where he began the final round of play two shots out of the lead but shot a final round 74 to finish T6. He was also the first round leader at the 1975 PGA Championship, but finished T22. In the second round of The Open Championship in 1977, Hayes shot 63 at the Ailsa Course at Turnberry to establish a new single round record at The Open Championship by two strokes. The previous record of 65 was set by Henry Cotton in the second round in 1934 at Royal St. George's.

Hayes played in the 1979 Ryder Cup team after Tom Watson gave up his spot to be with his wife at the birth of their first child. Hayes lost both his matches on the second day but won his singles match against Antonio Garrido on the final day, to help the United States to a 17 to 11 win over the European team.

=== Later career ===
In the late 1980s, Hayes began preparing for a career in golf course design and construction. In 1990, he established a golf course design firm. His projects were built in Oklahoma and neighboring states.

After turning 50, Hayes joined the Senior PGA Tour. His best finish was T10 at the 2001 Siebel Classic in Silicon Valley.

Hayes was well known for his trademark bucket caps.

== Personal life ==
Hayes died on July 17, 2018, from early-onset Alzheimer's disease.

== Amateur wins ==
- 1972 Sunnehanna Amateur

== Professional wins (7) ==
=== PGA Tour wins (3) ===
Legend
Players Championships (1)
Other PGA Tour (2)

No.	Date	Tournament	Winning score	To par	Margin of victory	Runner-up
1	May 9, 1976	Byron Nelson Golf Classic	66-67-71-69=273	−11	2 strokes	(United States) Don Bies
2	Nov 1, 1976	Pensacola Open	68-72-69-66=275	−9	2 strokes	(United States) Lee Elder
3	Mar 20, 1977	Tournament Players Championship	72-74-71-72=289	+1	2 strokes	(United States) Mike McCullough

PGA Tour playoff record (0–2)

No.	Year	Tournament	Opponent(s)	Result
1	1979	Bing Crosby National Pro-Am	(United States) Andy Bean, (United States) Lon Hinkle	Hinkle won with birdie on third extra hole Bean eliminated by par on second hole
2	1981	Greater Greensboro Open	(United States) Larry Nelson	Lost to birdie on second extra hole

=== PGA Tour satellite wins (1) ===
- 1986 Tallahassee Open

=== Other wins (3) ===
- 1976 Oklahoma Open
- 1988 Oklahoma Open
- 1993 Oklahoma Open

== Results in major championships ==
Tournament	1973	1974	1975	1976	1977	1978	1979
Masters Tournament					T33		
U.S. Open	CUT	T40		T14	T41	T35	CUT
The Open Championship					T9	T14	T30
PGA Championship			T22	T15	T19	CUT	T62

Tournament	1980	1981	1982	1983	1984	1985	1986	1987	1988	1989	1990
Masters Tournament	CUT	CUT	T10	T20	CUT						
U.S. Open	T6	T14	CUT	T26	T43				CUT		CUT
The Open Championship	T32										
PGA Championship	T59	T33	T34	CUT			CUT	CUT			

Top 10
Did not play

CUT = missed the half-way cut
"T" indicates a tie for a place

=== Summary ===
Tournament	Wins	2nd	3rd	Top-5	Top-10	Top-25	Events	Cuts made
Masters Tournament	0	0	0	0	1	2	6	3
U.S. Open	0	0	0	0	1	3	13	8
The Open Championship	0	0	0	0	1	2	4	4
PGA Championship	0	0	0	0	0	3	11	7
Totals	0	0	0	0	3	10	34	22

- Most consecutive cuts made – 10 (1974 U.S. Open – 1978 Open Championship)
- Longest streak of top-10s – 1 (three times)

== The Players Championship ==
=== Wins (1) ===
Year	Championship	54 holes	Winning score	Margin	Runner-up
1977	Tournament Players Championship	Tied for lead	+1 (72-74-71-72=289)	2 strokes	(United States) Mike McCullough

=== Results timeline ===
Tournament	1974	1975	1976	1977	1978	1979	1980	1981	1982	1983	1984	1985	1986	1987	1988	1989	1990	1991
The Players Championship	T19	CUT	5	1	T28	T60	T45	T34	80		CUT	CUT	CUT	T54	CUT	T55		T52

Win
Top 10
Did not play

CUT = missed the halfway cut
"T" indicates a tie for a place.

== U.S. national team appearances ==
Amateur

- Eisenhower Trophy: 1972 (winners)

Professional

- Ryder Cup: 1979 (winners)

== See also ==
- 1973 PGA Tour Qualifying School graduates
- 1988 PGA Tour Qualifying School graduates
- 1989 PGA Tour Qualifying School graduates
- 1990 PGA Tour Qualifying School graduates
