= 1983 Tournament Players Championship =

Tournament information
- Dates: March 24–28, 1983
- Location: Ponte Vedra Beach, Florida; 30.198°N 81.394°W
- Courses: TPC Sawgrass, Stadium Course
- Tour: PGA Tour

Statistics
- Par: 72
- Length: 6,857 yards (6,270 m)
- Field: 129 players, 67 after cut
- Cut: 149 (+5)
- Prize fund: $700,000
- Winner's share: $126,000

Champion
- (United States) Hal Sutton
- 283 (−5)

Location map
- Location in the United States Location in Florida

The 1983 Tournament Players Championship was a golf tournament in Florida on the PGA Tour, held March 24–28 at TPC Sawgrass in Ponte Vedra Beach, southeast of Jacksonville. It was the tenth Tournament Players Championship.

Heavy rains on Thursday delayed the start until Friday, with the final two rounds planned for Sunday. Thunderstorms on Sunday morning allowed only the third round to be completed, and the final round was held on Monday.

Hal Sutton, age 24, came from four strokes back with a final round 69 to win his second tour event, one stroke ahead of runner-up Bob Eastwood. Later in the year, Sutton won his only major title, the PGA Championship in August at Riviera.

Defending champion Jerry Pate withdrew before the start, due to a lingering neck injury.

Sutton became the youngest champion of the TPC, formerly Mark Hayes, 27 in 1977. It was only for a year, as Fred Couples was five months younger at his win in 1984.

== Venue ==
This was the second Tournament Players Championship held at the TPC at Sawgrass Stadium Course and it remained at 6,857 yards (6,270 m). Despite refinements in the past year, the Pete Dye-designed course continued to be scrutinized by many.

== Eligibility requirements ==
1. Top 125 players on Final 1982 Official Money List
2. Players who appear in Top 25 on 1983 Official Money List as of March 14, 1981
3. Leading 1982 Official Money Winner on the Senior PGA Tour
4. All designated players
5. Any foreign player who meets the requirements of a designated Player, whether or not he is a PGA Tour member
6. Past winners of the Tournament Players Championship, World Series of Golf, PGA Championship, Masters Tournament and U.S. Open since 1973
7. Three "special selections," as determined by TPC Committee

== Field ==
John Adams, Isao Aoki, George Archer, Seve Ballesteros, Miller Barber, Andy Bean, Chip Beck, Woody Blackburn, Jim Booros, Bill Britton, Brad Bryant, George Burns, Bob Byman, Rex Caldwell, Antonio Cerda Jr., Bobby Clampett, Lennie Clements, Jim Colbert, Bobby Cole, Frank Conner, Charles Coody, John Cook, Fred Couples, Ben Crenshaw, Jim Dent, Bruce Devlin, Terry Diehl, Mike Donald, Bob Eastwood, Danny Edwards, David Edwards, Dave Eichelberger, Lee Elder, Nick Faldo, Keith Fergus, Forrest Fezler, Ed Fiori, Bruce Fleisher, Raymond Floyd, John Fought, Al Geiberger, Gibby Gilbert, Bob Gilder, David Graham, Lou Graham, Thomas Gray, Hubert Green, Jay Haas, Gary Hallberg, Dan Halldorson, Phil Hancock, Morris Hatalsky, Vance Heafner, Lon Hinkle, Scott Hoch, Mike Holland, Joe Inman, Hale Irwin, Peter Jacobsen, Barry Jaeckel, Tom Jenkins, Tom Kite, Gary Koch, Wayne Levi, Bruce Lietzke, Pat Lindsey, Mark Lye, John Mahaffey, Roger Maltbie, Mike McCullough, Mark McCumber, Pat McGowan, Mark McNulty, Steve Melnyk, Allen Miller, Johnny Miller, Jeff Mitchell, Larry Mize, Gil Morgan, Jodie Mudd, Bob Murphy, Tsuneyuki Nakajima, Jim Nelford, Larry Nelson, Jack Nicklaus, Mike Nicolette, Greg Norman, Tim Norris, Andy North, Mark O'Meara, Peter Oosterhuis, Arnold Palmer, Calvin Peete, Mark Pfeil, Dan Pohl, Don Pooley, Greg Powers, Tom Purtzer, Victor Regalado, Mike Reid, Jack Renner, Bill Rogers, Clarence Rose, Bob Shearer, Jim Simons, Scott Simpson, Tim Simpson, J. C. Snead, Ed Sneed, Craig Stadler, Payne Stewart, Curtis Strange, Ron Streck, Mike Sullivan, Hal Sutton, Doug Tewell, Leonard Thompson, Jim Thorpe, Lee Trevino, Howard Twitty, Tommy Valentine, Bobby Wadkins, Lanny Wadkins, Denis Watson, Tom Watson, D. A. Weibring, Tom Weiskopf, Larry Ziegler, Fuzzy Zoeller

- Defending champion Jerry Pate withdrew due to a lingering neck injury.

== Round summaries ==
=== First round ===
Friday, March 25, 1983

Rain washed out play on Thursday, and the final two rounds were rescheduled for Sunday.

Place	Player	Score	To par
1	(United States) Bruce Lietzke	68	−4
T2	(United States) Bobby Clampett	69	−3
T2	(United States) John Cook	69	−3
T2	(United States) Bob Eastwood	69	−3
T2	(United States) Mark McCumber	69	−3
T2	(United States) Leonard Thompson	69	−3
T7	(United States) Ben Crenshaw	70	−2
T7	(United States) Danny Edwards	70	−2
T7	(United States) Raymond Floyd	70	−2
T7	(England) Peter Oosterhuis	70	−2
T7	(United States) Tom Weiskopf	70	−2

=== Second round ===
Saturday, March 26, 1983

With two rounds planned for Sunday, the cut was set at 149 (+5), reducing the field to 67. The eight players on 150, who would normally have made the cut, received prize money.

Place	Player	Score	To par
1	(United States) John Cook	69-70=139	−5
T2	(United States) Bobby Clampett	69-72=141	−3
T2	(United States) Peter Jacobsen	73-68=141	−3
T2	(United States) Don Pooley	71-70=141	−3
T2	(United States) J. C. Snead	71-70=141	−3
6	(United States) Bob Murphy	72-70=142	−2
T7	(United States) Lennie Clements	73-70=143	−1
T7	(United States) Vance Heafner	72-71=143	−1
T7	(United States) Bruce Lietzke	68-75=143	−1
T7	(Japan) Tsuneyuki Nakajima	71-72=143	−1

=== Third round ===
Sunday, March 27, 1983

Officials had hoped to complete the event with 36 holes on Sunday. Thunderstorms in the morning delayed play for three hours, and the final round was moved to Monday.

Place	Player	Score	To par
1	(United States) John Cook	69-70-71=210	−6
2	(United States) Bobby Clampett	69-72-70=211	−5
3	(United States) Vance Heafner	72-71-69=212	−4
T4	(United States) Ben Crenshaw	70-74-69=213	−3
T4	(United States) Peter Jacobsen	73-68-72=213	−3
T4	(United States) Don Pooley	71-70-72=213	−3
T7	(United States) Bruce Lietzke	68-75-71=214	−2
T7	(United States) Hal Sutton	73-71-70=214	−2
9	(United States) Bob Eastwood	69-75-71=215	−1
T10	(United States) Keith Fergus	74-71-71=216	E
T10	(United States) Ed Fiori	72-73-71=216	E
T10	(United States) Gil Morgan	74-72-70=216	E
T10	(Japan) Tsuneyuki Nakajima	71-72-73=216	E
T10	(United States) J. C. Snead	71-70-75=216	E

=== Final round ===
Monday, March 28, 1983

Champion
(c) = past champion

Place	Player	Score	To par	Money ($)
1	(United States) Hal Sutton	73-71-70-69=283	−5	126,000
2	(United States) Bob Eastwood	69-75-71-69=284	−4	75,600
T3	(United States) John Cook	69-70-71-75=285	−3	36,400
T3	(United States) Bruce Lietzke	68-75-71-71=285	−3	36,400
T3	(United States) John Mahaffey	72-74-72-67=285	−3	36,400
T6	(United States) Vance Heafner	72-71-69-74=286	−2	24,325
T6	(United States) Doug Tewell	72-74-70-70=286	−2	24,325
T8	(United States) Ed Fiori	72-73-71-71=287	−1	21,000
T8	(United States) Curtis Strange	72-75-70-70=287	−1	21,000
T10	(United States) Bobby Clampett	69-72-70-77=288	E	17,500
T10	(United States) Ben Crenshaw	70-74-69-75=288	E	17,500
T10	(United States) Don Pooley	71-70-72-75=288	E	17,500

Leaderboard below the top 10
Place	Player	Score	To par	Money ($)
T13	(United States) Keith Fergus	74-71-71-73=289	+1	13,533
T13	(United States) Wayne Levi	72-74-71-72=289	+1	13,533
T13	(United States) Larry Mize	72-76-72-69=289	+1	13,533
T16	(United States) Peter Jacobsen	73-68-72-77=290	+2	11,200
T16	(United States) Johnny Miller	73-73-73-71=290	+2	11,200
T16	(Japan) Tsuneyuki Nakajima	71-72-73-74=290	+2	11,200
T19	(United States) Lennie Clements	73-70-74-74=291	+3	8,785
T19	(United States) Jack Nicklaus (c)	73-76-68-74=291	+3	8,785
T19	(United States) Tom Purtzer	71-73-76-71=291	+3	8,785
T19	(United States) Tom Watson	75-74-70-72=291	+3	8,785
T23	(United States) Terry Diehl	73-71-75-73=292	+4	6,440
T23	(United States) Raymond Floyd (c)	70-76-72-74=292	+4	6,440
T23	(United States) Barry Jaeckel	73-71-74-74=292	+4	6,440
T23	(United States) Gil Morgan	74-72-70-76=292	+4	6,440
T27	(United States) Danny Edwards	70-77-73-73=293	+5	4,970
T27	(United States) Bruce Fleisher	73-75-75-70=293	+5	4,970
T27	(United States) Tom Kite	72-75-73-73=293	+5	4,970
T27	(United States) Mike McCullough	74-74-73-72=293	+5	4,970
T27	(United States) Leonard Thompson	69-76-74-74=293	+5	4,970
T32	(United States) Joe Inman	72-72-74-76=294	+6	4,142
T32	(United States) Bob Murphy	72-70-77-75=294	+6	4,142
T32	(United States) J. C. Snead	71-70-75-78=294	+6	4,142
T35	(United States) John Adams	74-74-76-71=295	+7	3,304
T35	(Spain) Seve Ballesteros	72-75-70-78=295	+7	3,304
T35	(United States) David Edwards	72-75-73-75=295	+7	3,304
T35	(England) Nick Faldo	74-74-72-75=295	+7	3,304
T35	(United States) Bob Gilder	72-73-74-76=295	+7	3,304
T35	(Australia) David Graham	73-72-74-76=295	+7	3,304
T35	(United States) Calvin Peete	73-73-77-72=295	+7	3,304
42	(United States) Allen Miller	75-74-72-75=296	+8	2,730
T43	(Japan) Isao Aoki	75-74-75-73=297	+9	2,244
T43	(United States) Frank Conner	73-75-75-74=297	+9	2,244
T43	(United States) Dave Eichelberger	76-73-73-75=297	+9	2,244
T43	(United States) Gary Koch	77-71-79-70=297	+9	2,244
T43	(United States) Tim Norris	74-74-76-73=297	+9	2,244
T43	(England) Peter Oosterhuis	70-78-73-76=297	+9	2,244
T49	(United States) Charles Coody	76-72-79-71=298	+10	1,727
T49	(United States) Hale Irwin	75-72-72-79=298	+10	1,727
T49	(United States) Mark McCumber	69-77-75-77=298	+10	1,727
T49	(United States) Mark O'Meara	71-77-74-76=298	+10	1,727
T49	(United States) Bobby Wadkins	72-75-74-77=298	+10	1,727
T54	(United States) Arnold Palmer	77-72-76-74=299	+11	1,617
T54	(United States) Jim Thorpe	73-75-77-74=299	+11	1,617
T56	(United States) Al Geiberger (c)	72-74-74-80=300	+12	1,568
T56	(United States) Gibby Gilbert	72-74-75-79=300	+12	1,568
T56	(United States) Lon Hinkle	74-73-73-80=300	+12	1,568
T56	(United States) Ron Streck	71-77-76-76=300	+12	1,568
T56	(United States) Tom Weiskopf	70-77-81-72=300	+12	1,568
T61	(Canada) Jim Nelford	72-77-72-80=301	+13	1,519
T61	(United States) Scott Simpson	75-74-76-76=301	+13	1,519
T63	(Australia) Greg Norman	71-77-76-78=302	+14	1,498
T63	(United States) Craig Stadler	74-74-70-84=302	+14	1,498
65	(United States) Mark Pfeil	71-75-81-77=304	+16	1,470
66	(United States) Jim Colbert	72-77-83-73=305	+17	1,456
WD	(United States) Mike Nicolette	73-71-79=223	+7	1,442
T68	(United States) Jim Dent	75-75=150	+6	1,379
T68	(United States) Tom Jenkins	79-71=150	+6	1,379
T68	(United States) Roger Maltbie	71-79=150	+6	1,379
T68	(United States) Bill Rogers	74-76=150	+6	1,379
T68	(Australia) Bob Shearer	78-72=150	+6	1,379
T68	(United States) Jim Simons	73-77=150	+6	1,379
T68	(United States) Lee Trevino (c)	77-73=150	+6	1,379
T68	(United States) Howard Twitty	78-72=150	+6	1,379
CUT	(United States) Chip Beck	75-76=151	+7	
CUT	(United States) Thomas Gray	76-75=151	+7	
CUT	(United States) Hubert Green	74-77=151	+7	
CUT	(United States) Scott Hoch	77-74=151	+7	
CUT	(United States) Pat Lindsey	78-73=151	+7	
CUT	(Zimbabwe) Mark McNulty	73-78=151	+7	
CUT	(United States) Dan Pohl	76-75=151	+7	
CUT	(United States) Clarence Rose	76-75=151	+7	
CUT	(United States) Ed Sneed	75-76=151	+7	
CUT	(United States) Brad Bryant	75-77=152	+8	
CUT	(United States) George Burns	78-74=152	+8	
CUT	(United States) Rex Caldwell	71-81=152	+8	
CUT	(United States) Lee Elder	77-75=152	+8	
CUT	(United States) Forrest Fezler	78-74=152	+8	
CUT	(United States) John Fought	76-76=152	+8	
CUT	(Canada) Dan Halldorson	78-74=152	+8	
CUT	(United States) Phil Hancock	77-75=152	+8	
CUT	(United States) Steve Melnyk	79-73=152	+8	
CUT	(United States) Tim Simpson	75-77=152	+8	
CUT	(United States) George Archer	75-78=153	+9	
CUT	(Mexico) Antonio Cerda Jr.	74-79=153	+9	
CUT	(United States) Jack Renner	78-75=153	+9	
CUT	(United States) Miller Barber	77-77=154	+10	
CUT	(United States) Woody Blackburn	75-79=154	+10	
CUT	(Australia) Bruce Devlin	76-78=154	+10	
CUT	(United States) Mike Donald	78-76=154	+10	
CUT	(United States) Gary Hallberg	76-78=154	+10	
CUT	(United States) Morris Hatalsky	76-78=154	+10	
CUT	(United States) Pat McGowan	80-74=154	+10	
CUT	(United States) D. A. Weibring	80-74=154	+10	
CUT	(United States) Andy North	77-78=155	+11	
CUT	(United States) Tommy Valentine	73-82=155	+11	
CUT	(United States) Andy Bean	73-83=156	+12	
CUT	(United States) Bill Britton	79-77=156	+12	
CUT	(United States) Mark Lye	74-82=156	+12	
CUT	(United States) Payne Stewart	78-78=156	+12	
CUT	(United States) Lanny Wadkins (c)	76-80=156	+12	
CUT	(Zimbabwe) Denis Watson	79-78=157	+13	
CUT	(United States) Mike Reid	82-76=158	+14	
CUT	(United States) Jeff Mitchell	81-78=159	+15	
CUT	(United States) Larry Ziegler	75-84=159	+15	
CUT	(United States) Jodie Mudd	78-82=160	+16	
CUT	(United States) Jim Booros	82-79=161	+17	
CUT	(United States) Bob Byman	80-81=161	+17	
CUT	(United States) Mike Holland	75-86=161	+17	
CUT	(United States) Larry Nelson	83-78=161	+17	
CUT	(United States) Greg Powers	84-78=162	+18	
CUT	(United States) Fuzzy Zoeller	82-80=162	+18	
CUT	(Mexico) Victor Regalado	83-80=163	+19	
CUT	(South Africa) Bobby Cole	86-79=165	+21	
CUT	(United States) Fred Couples	81-84=165	+21	
WD	(United States) Lou Graham	77	+5	
WD	(United States) Jay Haas	80	+8	
DQ	(United States) Mike Sullivan	76	+4	
