= 1984 Tournament Players Championship =

Tournament information
- Dates: March 29 – April 1, 1984
- Location: Ponte Vedra Beach, Florida; 30.198°N 81.394°W
- Courses: TPC Sawgrass, Stadium Course
- Tour: PGA Tour

Statistics
- Par: 72
- Length: 6,857 yards (6,270 m)
- Field: 144 players, 71 after cut
- Cut: 149 (+5)
- Prize fund: $800,000
- Winner's share: $144,000

Champion
- (United States) Fred Couples
- 277 (−11)

Location map
- Location in the United States Location in Florida

The 1984 Tournament Players Championship was a golf tournament in Florida on the PGA Tour, held March 29 to April 1 at TPC Sawgrass in Ponte Vedra Beach, southeast of Jacksonville. It was the eleventh Tournament Players Championship.

Fred Couples, age 24, shot a course record 64 in the second round, and finished at 277, one stroke ahead of runner-up Lee Trevino. It was his second win on tour, and he won this championship twelve years later in 1996. Trevino, the champion in 1980 at adjacent Sawgrass Country Club, had missed the cut at the previous two editions, the first two held at the new venue.

Defending champion Hal Sutton finished sixteen strokes back, in a tie for 41st place.

Couples was the youngest champion for twenty years, until Adam Scott won at age 23 in 2004. Sutton had been the youngest, but only for a year; Couples was five months younger at the time of his win.

Eight years later, Couples lowered the course record to 63 in the third round, but finished eight strokes back.

== Venue ==
This was the third Tournament Players Championship held at the TPC at Sawgrass Stadium Course and it remained at 6,857 yards (6,270 m). In response to player concerns, the course had undergone further refinements: greens were flattened and slowed and most of the waste areas were removed.

== Eligibility requirements ==
1. Top 125 players, if PGA Tour members, from Final 1983 Official Money List
2. Designated players
3. Any foreign player meeting the requirements of a designated player, whether or not he is a PGA Tour member
4. Winners in the last 10 calendar years of the Tournament Players Championship, PGA Championship, U.S. Open, Masters Tournament and World Series of Golf (beginning in 1976)
5. The leader in Senior PGA Tour official earnings of 1983
6. The three players, not otherwise eligible, designated by the TPC Committee as "special selections"
7. To complete a field of 144 players, those players in order, not otherwise eligible, from the 1984 Official Money List, as of the completion of the Bay Hill Classic, March 19, 1984

== Field ==
John Adams, Isao Aoki, George Archer, Wally Armstrong, Seve Ballesteros, Dave Barr, Andy Bean, Chip Beck, Ronnie Black, Jim Booros, Bob Boyd, Bill Britton, Mark Brooks, Brad Bryant, George Burns, George Cadle, Rex Caldwell, Chen Tze-chung, Bobby Clampett, Lennie Clements, Russ Cochran, Jim Colbert, Frank Conner, John Cook, Fred Couples, Ben Crenshaw, Jim Dent, Mike Donald, Bob Eastwood, Danny Edwards, David Edwards, Dave Eichelberger, Lee Elder, Nick Faldo, Brad Faxon, Keith Fergus, Ed Fiori, Bruce Fleisher, Raymond Floyd, Dan Forsman, John Fought, Buddy Gardner, Al Geiberger, Gibby Gilbert, Bob Gilder, David Graham, Lou Graham, Thomas Gray, Hubert Green, Ken Green, Jay Haas, Gary Hallberg, Dan Halldorson, Donnie Hammond, Phil Hancock, Morris Hatalsky, Mark Hayes, Vance Heafner, Lon Hinkle, Scott Hoch, Joe Inman, Hale Irwin, Peter Jacobsen, Barry Jaeckel, Tom Jenkins, Tom Kite, Gary Koch, Ralph Landrum, Bernhard Langer, Wayne Levi, Steven Liebler, Bruce Lietzke, Pat Lindsey, Mark Lye, John Mahaffey, Roger Maltbie, Gary McCord, Mike McCullough, Mark McCumber, Pat McGowan, Allen Miller, Johnny Miller, Jeff Mitchell, Larry Mize, Griff Moody, Gil Morgan, Bob Murphy, Tsuneyuki Nakajima, Jim Nelford, Larry Nelson, Jack Nicklaus, Mike Nicolette, Greg Norman, Tim Norris, Andy North, Mac O'Grady, Mark O'Meara, David Ogrin, Peter Oosterhuis, Arnold Palmer, Jerry Pate, Corey Pavin, Mark Pfeil, Gary Player, Dan Pohl, Don Pooley, Greg Powers, Nick Price, Tom Purtzer, Sammy Rachels, Joey Rassett, Victor Regalado, Mike Reid, Jack Renner, Larry Rinker, Bill Rogers, Clarence Rose, Bill Sander, Bob Shearer, Tony Sills, Scott Simpson, Tim Simpson, Joey Sindelar, J. C. Snead, Ed Sneed, Craig Stadler, Payne Stewart, Dave Stockton, Curtis Strange, Ron Streck, Mike Sullivan, Hal Sutton, Doug Tewell, Leonard Thompson, Jim Thorpe, Lee Trevino, Bobby Wadkins, Lanny Wadkins, Denis Watson, Tom Watson, D. A. Weibring, Tom Weiskopf, Willie Wood, Richard Zokol

== Round summaries ==
=== First round ===
Thursday, March 29, 1984

Place	Player	Score	To par
1	(United States) Jim Thorpe	68	−4
2	(United States) John Mahaffey	69	−3
T3	(Spain) Seve Ballesteros	70	−2
T3	(United States) Johnny Miller	70	−2
T6	(United States) John Cook	71	−1
T6	(United States) Fred Couples	71	−1
T6	(United States) Hubert Green	71	−1
T6	(United States) Jay Haas	71	−1
T6	(United States) Wayne Levi	71	−1
T6	(United States) Bruce Lietzke	71	−1
T6	(United States) Tim Simpson	71	−1
T6	(United States) Hal Sutton	71	−1

=== Second round ===
Friday, March 30, 1984

Place	Player	Score	To par
1	(United States) Fred Couples	71-64=135	−9
2	(United States) Jim Thorpe	68-69=137	−7
T3	(Spain) Seve Ballesteros	70-68=138	−6
T3	(United States) Lanny Wadkins	72-66=138	−6
5	(United States) Johnny Miller	70-69=139	−5
T6	(United States) Jay Haas	71-69=140	−4
T6	(United States) Larry Rinker	75-67=140	−4
T8	(Japan) Isao Aoki	72-69=141	−3
T8	(United States) Mark O'Meara	72-69=141	−3
T8	(United States) Hal Sutton	71-70=141	−3

=== Third round ===
Saturday, March 31, 1984

Place	Player	Score	To par
1	(United States) Fred Couples	71-64-71=206	−10
2	(Spain) Seve Ballesteros	70-68-70=208	−8
3	(United States) Tom Watson	75-67-67=209	−7
T4	(United States) Mark O'Meara	72-69-69=210	−6
T4	(United States) Craig Stadler	74-70-66=210	−6
T4	(United States) Lee Trevino	76-66-68=210	−6
7	(United States) John Mahaffey	69-74-69=212	−4
T8	(United States) Dan Pohl	71-69-74=214	−2
T8	(United States) Larry Mize	75-72-67=214	−2
T8	(United States) Dan Pohl	74-69-71=214	−2

=== Final round ===
Sunday, April 1, 1984

Champion
(c) = past champion

Place	Player	Score	To par	Money ($)
1	(United States) Fred Couples	71-64-71-71=277	−11	144,000
2	(United States) Lee Trevino (c)	76-66-68-68=278	−10	86,400
T3	(Spain) Seve Ballesteros	70-68-70-74=282	−6	46,400
T3	(United States) Craig Stadler	74-70-66-72=282	−6	46,400
T5	(United States) Mark O'Meara	72-69-69-73=283	−5	30,400
T5	(United States) Lanny Wadkins (c)	72-66-78-67=283	−5	30,400
7	(Zimbabwe) Nick Price	70-72-74-68=284	−4	26,800
T8	(United States) Dan Pohl	74-69-71-71=285	−3	24,000
T8	(United States) Tom Watson	75-67-67-76=285	−3	24,000
T10	(United States) John Mahaffey	69-74-69-74=286	−2	20,800
T10	(United States) Jim Thorpe	68-69-78-71=286	−2	20,800

Leaderboard below the top 10
Place	Player	Score	To par	Money ($)
T12	(United States) Raymond Floyd (c)	77-71-70-69=287	−1	16,800
T12	(United States) Bruce Lietzke	71-73-74-69=287	−1	16,800
T12	(United States) Tim Simpson	71-73-74-69=287	−1	16,800
T15	(Japan) Isao Aoki	72-69-76-71=288	E	12,800
T15	(United States) David Edwards	73-71-78-66=288	E	12,800
T15	(United States) Phil Hancock	76-70-72-70=288	E	12,800
T15	(United States) Hale Irwin	73-74-72-69=288	E	12,800
T15	(United States) Larry Mize	75-72-67-74=288	E	12,800
T20	(United States) Jim Colbert	74-75-72-68=289	+1	8,666
T20	(England) Nick Faldo	73-73-74-69=289	+1	8,666
T20	(United States) Keith Fergus	74-73-72-70=289	+1	8,666
T20	(United States) Donnie Hammond	77-70-69-73=289	+1	8,666
T20	(United States) Wayne Levi	71-71-76-71=289	+1	8,666
T20	(United States) Pat Lindsey	73-71-75-70=289	+1	8,666
T26	(United States) Ben Crenshaw	74-73-73-70=290	+2	6,160
T26	(England) Peter Oosterhuis	73-69-74-74=290	+2	6,160
T26	(United States) Mike Sullivan	75-70-71-74=290	+2	6,160
T29	(United States) Chip Beck	77-72-73-69=291	+3	5,320
T29	(United States) Jay Haas	71-69-74-77=291	+3	5,320
T29	(West Germany) Bernhard Langer	72-70-75-74=291	+3	5,320
T29	(United States) Johnny Miller	70-69-78-74=291	+3	5,320
T33	(United States) George Archer	76-69-77-70=292	+4	4,050
T33	(United States) Brad Faxon	75-72-77-68=292	+4	4,050
T33	(United States) John Fought	75-72-73-72=292	+4	4,050
T33	(United States) Barry Jaeckel	72-72-72-76=292	+4	4,050
T33	(United States) Jack Nicklaus (c)	78-70-75-69=292	+4	4,050
T33	(United States) Clarence Rose	73-72-72-75=292	+4	4,050
T33	(United States) Scott Simpson	75-74-72-71=292	+4	4,050
T33	(United States) Curtis Strange	74-73-74-71=292	+4	4,050
T41	(Australia) David Graham	76-73-73-71=293	+5	3,120
T41	(United States) Tom Purtzer	76-69-76-72=293	+5	3,120
T41	(United States) Hal Sutton (c)	71-70-74-78=293	+5	3,120
T44	(United States) Russ Cochran	72-74-76-72=294	+6	2,361
T44	(United States) John Cook	71-76-73-74=294	+6	2,361
T44	(United States) Dave Eichelberger	74-72-73-75=294	+6	2,361
T44	(United States) Scott Hoch	78-71-72-73=294	+6	2,361
T44	(United States) Gil Morgan	72-76-73-73=294	+6	2,361
T44	(United States) Ron Streck	76-72-73-73=294	+6	2,361
T44	(United States) Willie Wood	72-73-77-72=294	+6	2,361
T51	(United States) Peter Jacobsen	75-73-76-71=295	+7	1,925
T51	(United States) Tom Jenkins	80-69-72-74=295	+7	1,925
T51	(United States) Tom Kite	74-70-74-77=295	+7	1,925
T54	(United States) Gary Hallberg	73-71-78-74=296	+8	1,824
T54	(United States) Gary Koch	77-71-75-73=296	+8	1,824
T54	(United States) Allen Miller	76-72-73-75=296	+8	1,824
T54	(Japan) Tsuneyuki Nakajima	74-71-76-75=296	+8	1,824
T54	(United States) Larry Rinker	73-67-85-71=296	+8	1,824
T59	(United States) Wally Armstrong	76-73-74-74=297	+9	1,768
T59	(United States) Gibby Gilbert	76-72-79-70=297	+9	1,768
61	(South Africa) Gary Player	74-73-74-77=298	+10	1,744
T62	(United States) Bob Eastwood	74-72-77-76=299	+11	1,720
T62	(United States) Larry Nelson	75-72-74-78=299	+11	1,720
T64	(United States) Bobby Clampett	73-75-79-73=300	+12	1,688
T64	(United States) Payne Stewart	79-70-75-76=300	+12	1,688
T66	(United States) Buddy Gardner	73-75-73-80=301	+13	1,640
T66	(United States) Thomas Gray	75-73-79-74=301	+13	1,640
T66	(United States) Hubert Green	71-78-81-71=301	+13	1,640
T66	(United States) Arnold Palmer	72-76-76-77=301	+13	1,640
70	(United States) Lennie Clements	72-76-77-77=302	+14	1,600
71	(United States) Danny Edwards	76-72-78-79=305	+17	1,584
CUT	(United States) Rex Caldwell	75-75=150	+6	
CUT	(United States) Jim Dent	76-74=150	+6	
CUT	(United States) Lou Graham	76-74=150	+6	
CUT	(United States) Mac O'Grady	78-72=150	+6	
CUT	(United States) Sammy Rachels	77-73=150	+6	
CUT	(United States) Doug Tewell	75-75=150	+6	
CUT	(Canada) Dave Barr	79-72=151	+7	
CUT	(United States) Andy Bean	79-72=151	+7	
CUT	(United States) Mark Brooks	77-74=151	+7	
CUT	(United States) Frank Conner	78-73=151	+7	
CUT	(United States) Ralph Landrum	75-76=151	+7	
CUT	(Australia) Greg Norman	72-79=151	+7	
CUT	(United States) Tim Norris	79-72=151	+7	
CUT	(United States) Greg Powers	76-75=151	+7	
CUT	(United States) Joey Rassett	74-77=151	+7	
CUT	(United States) Joey Sindelar	74-77=151	+7	
CUT	(United States) Bobby Wadkins	75-76=151	+7	
CUT	(United States) John Adams	75-77=152	+8	
CUT	(United States) Mike Donald	80-72=152	+8	
CUT	(Canada) Dan Halldorson	79-73=152	+8	
CUT	(United States) Mark Lye	78-74=152	+8	
CUT	(United States) Pat McGowan	74-78=152	+8	
CUT	(United States) David Ogrin	75-77=152	+8	
CUT	(United States) Mark Pfeil	79-73=152	+8	
CUT	(United States) Don Pooley	80-72=152	+8	
CUT	(Mexico) Victor Regalado	75-77=152	+8	
CUT	(United States) Mike Reid	81-71=152	+8	
CUT	(United States) Jack Renner	75-77=152	+8	
CUT	(United States) Ed Sneed	74-78=152	+8	
CUT	(United States) Bill Britton	79-74=153	+9	
CUT	(United States) Mark Hayes (c)	77-76=153	+9	
CUT	(United States) Joe Inman	77-76=153	+9	
CUT	(United States) Griff Moody	78-75=153	+9	
CUT	(United States) Jerry Pate (c)	79-74=153	+9	
CUT	(United States) D. A. Weibring	76-77=153	+9	
CUT	(United States) Ronnie Black	80-74=154	+10	
CUT	(United States) George Cadle	76-78=154	+10	
CUT	(United States) Lee Elder	80-74=154	+10	
CUT	(United States) Al Geiberger (c)	79-75=154	+10	
CUT	(United States) Steven Liebler	80-74=154	+10	
CUT	(Canada) Jim Nelford	79-75=154	+10	
CUT	(United States) Bill Rogers	75-79=154	+10	
CUT	(United States) Tom Weiskopf	78-76=154	+10	
CUT	(United States) Brad Bryant	81-74=155	+11	
CUT	(United States) George Burns	81-74=155	+11	
CUT	(United States) Roger Maltbie	77-78=155	+11	
CUT	(Canada) Richard Zokol	77-78=155	+11	
CUT	(United States) Bob Gilder	76-80=156	+12	
CUT	(United States) Gary McCord	79-77=156	+12	
CUT	(United States) Andy North	81-75=156	+12	
CUT	(Taiwan) Chen Tze-chung	80-77=157	+13	
CUT	(United States) Ken Green	85-72=157	+13	
CUT	(United States) Corey Pavin	75-82=157	+13	
CUT	(United States) J. C. Snead	85-72=157	+13	
CUT	(United States) Bob Boyd	80-78=158	+14	
CUT	(United States) Bruce Fleisher	83-75=158	+14	
CUT	(United States) Dave Stockton	84-74=158	+14	
CUT	(United States) Leonard Thompson	79-79=158	+14	
CUT	(United States) Jim Booros	82-77=159	+15	
CUT	(United States) Bob Murphy	84-75=159	+15	
CUT	(United States) Bill Sander	80-79=159	+15	
CUT	(United States) Tony Sills	81-78=159	+15	
CUT	(United States) Morris Hatalsky	77-83=160	+16	
CUT	(Australia) Bob Shearer	80-80=160	+16	
CUT	(Zimbabwe) Denis Watson	82-79=161	+17	
CUT	(United States) Ed Fiori	84-81=165	+21	
CUT	(United States) Dan Forsman	86-80=166	+22	
CUT	(United States) Lon Hinkle	84-85=169	+25	
WD	(United States) Mike Nicolette	76	+4	
WD	(United States) Vance Heafner	79	+7	
WD	(United States) Mike McCullough	88	+16	
DQ	(United States) Mark McCumber	72	E	
DQ	(United States) Jeff Mitchell			
