= Tallahassee Open =

Golf tournament formerly on the PGA Tour

Centel Classic
Tournament information
- Location: Tallahassee, Florida
- Established: 1969
- Courses: Killearn Golf and Country Club
- Par: 72
- Length: 7,098 yards (6,490 m)
- Tour: PGA Tour
- Format: Stroke play
- Prize fund: US$750,000
- Month played: September/October
- Final year: 1989

Tournament record score
- Aggregate: 269 Chi-Chi Rodríguez (1979); 269 Jeff Sluman (1985)
- To par: −19 as above

Final champion
- (United States) Bill Britton
- Location in the United States Location in Florida

The Tallahassee Open was a golf tournament on the PGA Tour from 1969 to 1989. It was played at Killearn Country Club in Tallahassee, Florida.

It was founded in 1969 as the Tallahassee Open Invitational. From 1983 to 1985, it was part of the PGA Tour's "Tournament Players Series", a "satellite tour". The purse for the 1989 tournament was $750,000 with 135,000 going to the winner.

The 1974 tournament featured the highest round scores in PGA history by a player who made the 36-hole cut. Mike Reasor severely injured himself horse riding between the second and third rounds. Needing to complete the tournament in order to gain an exemption for the Byron Nelson Classic, Reasor played the final two rounds using only a 5-iron and swinging using just one arm, recording scores of 123 and 114.

From 1990 to 1992, Killearn Country Club hosted a LPGA Tour event by the same name.

== Winners ==
| Year | Tour (Note: PGAT − PGA Tour; TPS − Tournament Players Series.) | Winner | Score | To par | Margin of victory | Runner(s)-up | Ref. |
Centel Classic
| 1989 | PGAT | (United States) Bill Britton | 200 (Note: Shortened to 54 holes due to rain.) | −16 | 4 strokes | (United States) Ronnie Black | |
| 1988 | PGAT | (United States) Bill Glasson | 272 | −16 | 2 strokes | (United States) Tommy Armour III | |
| 1987 | PGAT | (United States) Keith Clearwater | 278 | −10 | 1 stroke | (United States) Bill Glasson (United States) Billy Kratzert (United States) Bob Lohr (United States) Joey Sindelar | |
Tallahassee Open
| 1986 | | (United States) Mark Hayes | 274 | −10 | 1 stroke | (United States) Russ Cochran | |
| 1985 | TPS | (United States) Jeff Sluman | 269 | −19 | 1 stroke | (United States) Kenny Knox (South Africa) Gary Player | |
| 1984 | TPS | (United States) Kermit Zarley | 271 | −17 | Playoff | (Zimbabwe) Denis Watson | |
| 1983 | TPS | (New Zealand) Bob Charles | 282 | −6 | Playoff | (United States) Greg Powers | |
| 1982 | PGAT | (Australia) Bob Shearer | 272 | −16 | 1 stroke | (United States) Hal Sutton (Zimbabwe) Denis Watson | |
| 1981 | PGAT | (United States) Dave Eichelberger | 271 | −17 | Playoff | (United States) Bob Murphy (United States) Mark O'Meara | |
| 1980 | PGAT | (United States) Mark Pfeil | 277 | −11 | 1 stroke | (United States) Mark Lye (United States) Bill Rogers | |
| 1979 | PGAT | (United States) Chi-Chi Rodríguez | 269 | −19 | 3 strokes | (United States) Lindy Miller | |
| 1978 | PGAT | (United States) Barry Jaeckel | 273 | −15 | Playoff | (United States) Bruce Lietzke | |
| 1977 | PGAT | (United States) Ed Sneed | 276 | −12 | Playoff | (United States) Lon Hinkle | |
| 1976 | PGAT | (United States) Gary Koch | 277 | −11 | 1 stroke | (United States) John Mahaffey | |
| 1975 | PGAT | (United States) Rik Massengale | 274 | −14 | 2 strokes | (United States) Spike Kelley (United States) Bert Yancey | |
| 1974 | PGAT | (United States) Allen Miller | 274 | −14 | 1 stroke | (United States) Joe Inman (United States) Eddie Pearce (United States) Dan Sikes | |
| 1973 | PGAT | (United States) Hubert Green | 277 | −11 | 1 stroke | (United States) Jim Simons | |
| 1972 | PGAT | (Australia) Bob Shaw | 273 | −15 | 2 strokes | (United States) Leonard Thompson | |
Tallahassee Open Invitational
| 1971 | PGAT | (United States) Lee Trevino | 273 | −15 | 3 strokes | (United States) Jim Wiechers | |
| 1970 | PGAT | (South Africa) Harold Henning | 277 | −11 | 1 stroke | (United States) Rives McBee | |
| 1969 | PGAT | (United States) Chuck Courtney | 282 | −6 | 1 stroke | (United States) Jacky Cupit (United States) Bert Greene (Australia) Bob Shaw | |
