= Brad Fabel =

American professional golfer (born 1955)

Personal information
- Nationality: United States
- Born: November 30, 1955 (age 70) Louisville, Kentucky, U.S.
- Height: 6 ft 0 in (1.83 m)
- Weight: 190 lb (86 kg; 14 st)

Career
- Sport: Golf
- College: University of Houston; Western Kentucky University
- Turned professional: 1982
- Former tours: PGA Tour; Nationwide Tour
- Professional wins: 2

Number of wins by tour
- Korn Ferry Tour: 2

Best results in major championships
- Masters Tournament: DNP
- PGA Championship: T28: 1987
- U.S. Open: T34: 1999
- The Open Championship: DNP

Brad Fabel (born November 30, 1955) is an American professional golfer.

== Early life and amateur career ==
In 1955, Fabel was born in Louisville, Kentucky. He was a semifinalist at the 1973 U.S. Junior Amateur and won 1974 Kentucky Amateur. He played college golf first at the University of Houston, then at Western Kentucky University. He graduated from WKU in 1982.

== Professional career ==
In 1982, Fabel turned professional. Fabel played on the PGA Tour from 1985 to 1993 and 1996 to 2001. His best finish on tour was pair of T-2: at the 1990 Canon Greater Hartford Open and the 1997 Buick Open. He also played on the Nationwide Tour from 1994 to 1995 and 2001 to 2005, winning twice: the 1994 Nike Gateway Classic and the 1995 Nike Shreveport Open.

Since retiring in 2005, Fabel has worked as a PGA Tour rules official.

== Amateur wins ==
- 1974 Kentucky Amateur

== Professional wins (2) ==
=== Nike Tour wins (2) ===
No.	Date	Tournament	Winning score	Margin of victory	Runner(s)-up
1	Jul 24, 1994	Nike Gateway Classic	−9 (70-68-71-70=279)	1 stroke	(United States) Jim Carter, (United States) Chris Perry
2	Apr 23, 1995	Nike Shreveport Open	−13 (64-67=131) (Note: Shortened to 36 holes due to weather.)	4 strokes	(United States) Chris Smith

== Playoff record ==
Other playoff record (0–1)

No.	Year	Tournament	Opponents	Result
1	1985	Chrysler Team Championship (with (United States) Charlie Bolling)	(United States) Jim Colbert and (United States) Tom Purtzer, (United States) Raymond Floyd and (United States) Hal Sutton, (United States) John Fought and (United States) Pat McGowan, (United States) Gary Hallberg and (United States) Scott Hoch	Floyd/Sutton won with birdie on first extra hole

== Results in major championships ==
Tournament	1986	1987	1988	1989	1990	1991	1992	1993	1994	1995	1996	1997	1998	1999
U.S. Open	CUT				CUT			CUT					CUT	T34
PGA Championship		T28					T33						T71	

Did not play

CUT = missed the half-way cut
"T" = tied
Note: Fabel never played in the Masters Tournament or The Open Championship

== See also ==
- 1984 PGA Tour Qualifying School graduates
- 1986 PGA Tour Qualifying School graduates
- 1989 PGA Tour Qualifying School graduates
- 1995 Nike Tour graduates
