= Southwest Golf Classic =

Golf tournament formerly on the PGA Tour

Gatlin Brothers-Southwest Golf Classic
Tournament information
- Location: Abilene, Texas
- Established: 1981
- Course: Fairway Oaks Golf Club
- Par: 72
- Length: 7,166 yards (6,553 m)
- Tour: PGA Tour
- Format: Stroke play
- Prize fund: US$400,000
- Month played: October
- Final year: 1988

Tournament record score
- Aggregate: 269 Mark Brooks (1988); 269 Tom Purtzer (1988)
- To par: −19 as above

Final champion
- (United States) Tom Purtzer
- Location in the United States Location in Texas

The Southwest Golf Classic was a PGA Tour event played at Fairway Oaks Golf & Racquet Club in Abilene, Texas, from 1981 to 1988 (the facility was later renamed Fairway Oaks Country Club and is now a part of Abilene Country Club).

The event had been known as the LaJet Classic when it began in 1981 and again in 1982. In 1983, the event was known as the LaJet Coors Classic and in 1984 it was known as the LaJet Golf Classic. From 1985 to 1987 it was known as the Southwest Golf Classic. In 1988, the tournament event was hosted by Larry Gatlin & The Gatlin Brothers, and was known as the Gatlin Brothers-Southwest Golf Classic.

In 1989, the event became a Senior PGA Tour event, and was renamed the Gatlin Brothers Southwest Senior Classic.

== Tournament highlights ==
- 1981: Tom Weiskopf wins the inaugural version of the tournament. He finishes two shots ahead of Gil Morgan.
- 1982: Wayne Levi shoots a first round 64 on his way to a wire to wire victory by six shots over Thomas Gray. Raymond Floyd, who was engaged in a tight battle with Craig Stadler for that year's leading spot on the money list, left Abilene after shooting 146 for the first 36 holes thinking he would miss the cut. By the time Floyd learned he had not missed the cut, he had already returned to his home in Florida. Unable to make airline connections to meet his Saturday tee time, Floyd was forced to withdraw.
- 1986: Future 13-time winner and 1989 Open Champion Mark Calcavecchia notches his first PGA Tour title. He finishes three shots ahead of Tom Byrum.
- 1988: Tom Purtzer wins the last version of the tournament. He shoots a final round 64 before defeating Mark Brooks on the first hole of a sudden death playoff.

== Winners ==
Year	Winner	Score	To par	Margin of victory	Runner(s)-up
Gatlin Brothers-Southwest Golf Classic
1988	(United States) Tom Purtzer	269	−19	Playoff	(United States) Mark Brooks
Southwest Golf Classic
1987	(United States) Steve Pate	273	−15	1 stroke	(United States) Bob Eastwood (United States) David Edwards (Canada) Dan Halldorson (United States) Mark O'Meara
1986	(United States) Mark Calcavecchia	275	−13	3 strokes	(United States) Tom Byrum
1985	(United States) Hal Sutton	273	−15	Playoff	(United States) Mike Reid
LaJet Golf Classic
1984	(United States) Curtis Strange	273	−15	2 strokes	(United States) Mark O'Meara
LaJet Coors Classic
1983	(United States) Rex Caldwell	282	−6	1 stroke	(United States) Lee Trevino
LaJet Classic
1982	(United States) Wayne Levi	271	−17	6 strokes	(United States) Thomas Gray
1981	(United States) Tom Weiskopf	278	−10	2 strokes	(United States) Gil Morgan
