= 1983 PGA Tour =

Golf tour season

1983 PGA Tour season
- Duration: January 6, 1983 – October 30, 1983
- Number of official events: 43
- Most wins: (Spain) Seve Ballesteros (2) (United States) Jim Colbert (2) (United States) Mark McCumber (2) (United States) Gil Morgan (2) (United States) Calvin Peete (2) (United States) Hal Sutton (2) (United States) Lanny Wadkins (2) (United States) Fuzzy Zoeller (2)
- Money list: (United States) Hal Sutton
- PGA Player of the Year: (United States) Hal Sutton

The 1983 PGA Tour was the 68th season of the PGA Tour, the main professional golf tour in the United States. It was also the 15th season since separating from the PGA of America.

== Changes for 1983 ==
This was also the first season of the "All-Exempt Tour" which provided many more exemptions per year. For example, those that finished in the top 125 of the money list maintained full-time status rather than the top 60 which had been the historic benchmark.

== Schedule ==
The following table lists official events during the 1983 season.

Date	Tournament	Location	Purse (US$)	Winner (Note: The number in parentheses after each winner's name is the number of PGA Tour events they had won up to and including that tournament. This information is only shown for PGA Tour members.)	Notes
Jan 9	Joe Garagiola-Tucson Open	Arizona	300,000	(United States) Gil Morgan (5)	
Jan 16	Glen Campbell-Los Angeles Open	California	300,000	(United States) Gil Morgan (6)	
Jan 23	Bob Hope Desert Classic	California	375,000	(United States) Keith Fergus (3)	Pro-Am
Jan 30	Phoenix Open	Arizona	350,000	(United States) Bob Gilder (6)	
Feb 6	Bing Crosby National Pro-Am	California	325,000	(United States) Tom Kite (5)	Pro-Am
Feb 13	Hawaiian Open	Hawaii	325,000	(Japan) Isao Aoki (1)	
Feb 20	Isuzu-Andy Williams San Diego Open	California	300,000	(United States) Gary Hallberg (1)	
Feb 27	Doral-Eastern Open	Florida	300,000	(United States) Gary Koch (3)	
Mar 6	Honda Inverrary Classic	Florida	400,000	(United States) Johnny Miller (23)	
Mar 13	Bay Hill Classic	Florida	350,000	(United States) Mike Nicolette (1)	
Mar 20	USF&G Classic	Louisiana	400,000	(United States) Bill Rogers (6)	
Mar 28	Tournament Players Championship	Florida	700,000	(United States) Hal Sutton (2)	Special event
Apr 3	Greater Greensboro Open	North Carolina	400,000	(United States) Lanny Wadkins (11)	
Apr 10	Masters Tournament	Georgia	500,000	(Spain) Seve Ballesteros (4)	Major championship
Apr 18	Sea Pines Heritage	South Carolina	350,000	(United States) Fuzzy Zoeller (4)	Invitational
Apr 24	MONY Tournament of Champions	California	400,000	(United States) Lanny Wadkins (12)	Winners-only event
May 1	Byron Nelson Golf Classic	Texas	400,000	(United States) Ben Crenshaw (9)	
May 8	Houston Coca-Cola Open	Texas	400,000	(Australia) David Graham (8)	
May 15	Colonial National Invitation	Texas	400,000	(United States) Jim Colbert (7)	Invitational
May 22	Georgia-Pacific Atlanta Golf Classic	Georgia	400,000	(United States) Calvin Peete (6)	
May 29	Memorial Tournament	Ohio	400,000	(United States) Hale Irwin (15)	Invitational
Jun 5	Kemper Open	Maryland	400,000	(United States) Fred Couples (1)	
Jun 12	Manufacturers Hanover Westchester Classic	New York	450,000	(Spain) Seve Ballesteros (5)	
Jun 19	U.S. Open	Pennsylvania	500,000	(United States) Larry Nelson (6)	Major championship
Jun 26	Danny Thomas Memphis Classic	Tennessee	400,000	(United States) Larry Mize (1)	
Jul 3	Western Open	Illinois	400,000	(United States) Mark McCumber (2)	
Jul 10	Greater Milwaukee Open	Wisconsin	250,000	(United States) Morris Hatalsky (2)	
Jul 17	The Open Championship	England	£400,000	(United States) Tom Watson (33)	Major championship (Note: Unofficial money event at the time, but retrospectively counted as an official win.)
Jul 17	Miller High Life QCO	Illinois	200,000	(United States) Danny Edwards (4)	Alternate event
Jul 24	Anheuser-Busch Golf Classic	Virginia	350,000	(United States) Calvin Peete (7)	
Jul 31	Canadian Open	Canada	350,000	(United States) John Cook (2)	
Aug 7	PGA Championship	California	600,000	(United States) Hal Sutton (3)	Major championship
Aug 14	Buick Open	Michigan	350,000	(United States) Wayne Levi (6)	
Aug 21	Sammy Davis Jr.-Greater Hartford Open	Connecticut	300,000	(United States) Curtis Strange (4)	
Aug 28	World Series of Golf	Ohio	500,000	(Zimbabwe) Nick Price (1)	Limited-field event
Sep 4	B.C. Open	New York	300,000	(United States) Pat Lindsey (1)	
Sep 11	Bank of Boston Classic	Massachusetts	350,000	(United States) Mark Lye (1)	
Sep 18	Panasonic Las Vegas Pro Celebrity Classic	Nevada	750,000	(United States) Fuzzy Zoeller (5)	New Pro-Am tournament
Sep 25	LaJet Coors Classic	Texas	350,000	(United States) Rex Caldwell (1)	
Oct 2	Texas Open	Texas	300,000	(United States) Jim Colbert (8)	
Oct 9	Southern Open	Georgia	250,000	(United States) Ronnie Black (1)	
Oct 23	Walt Disney World Golf Classic	Florida	400,000	(United States) Payne Stewart (2)	
Oct 30	Pensacola Open	Florida	250,000	(United States) Mark McCumber (3)	

=== Unofficial events ===
The following events were sanctioned by the PGA Tour, but did not carry official money, nor were wins official.

Date	Tournament	Location	Purse ($)	Winner(s)	Notes
Oct 16	Ryder Cup	Florida	n/a	Team USA	Team event
Nov 6	Kapalua International	Hawaii	300,000	(Australia) Greg Norman	
Dec 11	World Cup	Indonesia	n/a	(United States) Rex Caldwell and (United States) John Cook	Team event
Dec 11	World Cup Individual Trophy	Indonesia	n/a	(Canada) Dave Barr	
Nov 27	Skins Game	Arizona	360,000	(South Africa) Gary Player	New limited-field event
Dec 11	JCPenney Mixed Team Classic	Florida	550,000	(United States) Fred Couples and (Australia) Jan Stephenson	Team event
Dec 18	Chrysler Team Championship	Florida	400,000	(United States) Johnny Miller and (United States) Jack Nicklaus	New team event

== Money list ==
The money list was based on prize money won during the season, calculated in U.S. dollars.

Position	Player	Prize money ($)
1	(United States) Hal Sutton	426,668
2	(United States) Fuzzy Zoeller	417,597
3	(United States) Lanny Wadkins	319,271
4	(United States) Calvin Peete	313,845
5	(United States) Gil Morgan	306,133
6	(United States) Rex Caldwell	284,434
7	(United States) Ben Crenshaw	275,474
8	(United States) Mark McCumber	268,294
9	(United States) Tom Kite	257,066
10	(United States) Jack Nicklaus	256,158

== Awards ==
Award	Winner	Ref.
PGA Player of the Year	(United States) Hal Sutton	
Scoring leader (PGA Tour – Byron Nelson Award)	(United States) Raymond Floyd	
Scoring leader (PGA – Vardon Trophy)	(United States) Raymond Floyd	

== See also ==
- 1983 Senior PGA Tour
