= Fred Couples =

American professional golfer (born 1959)

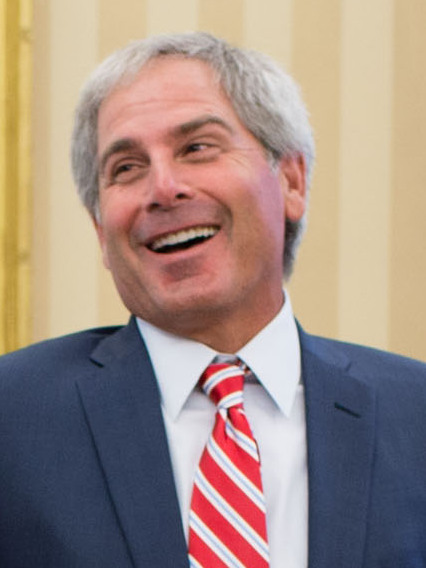
- Couples at the White House in 2013

Personal information
- Full name: Frederick Steven Couples
- Nickname: Boom Boom
- Nationality: United States
- Born: October 3, 1959 (age 67) Seattle, Washington, U.S.
- Height: 5 ft 11 in (1.80 m)
- Weight: 185 lb (84 kg; 13.2 st)
- Spouses: Deborah Couples (m. 1981; div. 1993) Thais Baker (m. 1998; died 2009) Suzanne Hannemann (m. 2022)

Career
- Sport: Golf
- College: University of Houston
- Turned professional: 1980
- Current tour: PGA Tour Champions
- Former tour: PGA Tour
- Professional wins: 64
- Highest ranking: 1 (March 22, 1992) (16 weeks)

Number of wins by tour
- PGA Tour: 15
- European Tour: 3
- PGA Tour Champions: 14
- European Senior Tour: 1
- Other: 33

Best results in major championships (wins: 1)
- Masters Tournament: Won: 1992
- PGA Championship: 2nd: 1990
- U.S. Open: T3: 1991
- The Open Championship: T3: 1991, 2005

Achievements and awards
- World Golf Hall of Fame: 2013 (member page)
- PGA Tour Player of the Year: 1991, 1992
- Byron Nelson Award: 1991, 1992
- Vardon Trophy: 1991, 1992
- PGA Tour money list winner: 1992
- PGA Player of the Year: 1992
- Champions Tour Rookie of the Year: 2010
- Champions Tour Byron Nelson Award: 2010, 2012, 2013

Frederick Steven Couples (born October 3, 1959) is an American professional golfer who has competed on the PGA Tour and the PGA Tour Champions. A former World No. 1, he has won 64 professional tournaments, most notably the Masters Tournament in 1992, and the Players Championship in 1984 and 1996. Couples became the oldest person to make the cut in the Masters Tournament history during the 2023 Tournament at 63 years, six months, and five days.

In August 2011, Couples won his first senior major at the Senior Players Championship and followed this up in July 2012 when he won the Senior Open Championship. He was inducted into the World Golf Hall of Fame in 2013. Couples garnered the nickname "Boom Boom" for his long, accurate driving ability off the tee during the prime of his career.

== Early life ==
Couples was born in Seattle, Washington, to Tom and Violet (née Sobich) Couples. His paternal grandparents immigrated from Italy and changed the family name from "Coppola" to "Couples" to make it sound less ethnic. His mother was of Croatian descent.

His father was a groundskeeper for the Seattle Parks Department and the family, which included brother Tom Jr. and sister Cindy, lived in a modest house on Beacon Hill near the city's Jefferson Park golf course, where Couples developed his signature loose, rhythmic swing in order to gain enough distance to keep up with the older children. Couples admitted to being self-taught, never taking a lesson and never hiring a swing coach.

Couples attended O'Dea High School in Seattle and graduated in 1977.

== Amateur career ==
In 1977, Couples accepted a golf scholarship to the University of Houston. As a member of the Houston Cougars men's golf team, he roomed with Blaine McCallister, another future PGA Tour player, and future CBS television broadcaster Jim Nantz.

As a 19-year-old amateur, Couples beat PGA Tour veteran (and fellow Seattle native) Don Bies in a playoff to win the 1978 Washington Open at the Glendale Country Club in Bellevue.

== Professional career ==
=== PGA Tour ===
Couples's first PGA Tour victory came at the Kemper Open in 1983 at Congressional Country Club in suburban Washington, D.C. Playing in the final group with Scott Simpson and Chen Tze-chung, the three finished over one hour after the previous group on the course. In spite of rounds of 77, 76, and 77, Couples, Simpson, and Chen finished tied for first along with Gil Morgan and Barry Jaeckel who had finished their rounds several hours earlier. Jaeckel, who spent time in a bar waiting for regulation play to conclude, was eliminated on the first playoff hole after hitting a wild tee shot. On the second hole, Couples scored a birdie to take home the title.

In addition to his Kemper Open win, Couples won another fourteen PGA Tour titles. Among them were two Players Championships (1984, 1996) and one major victory, the 1992 Masters Tournament.

Couples was named the PGA Tour Player of the Year twice, in 1991 and 1992. He also won the Vardon Trophy for lowest scoring average in each of those years. He has been named to the United States Ryder Cup team five times, in 1989, 1991, 1993, 1995 and 1997.

In 1992, Couples became the first American player to reach the number one position in the Official World Golf Rankings (since the World Ranking points system debuted in April 1986). He spent 16 weeks at number 1, after one of the hottest ever starts to a season by a PGA Tour player. Beginning with the Nissan Los Angeles Open, where he defeated Davis Love III in a playoff, Couples won two tournaments and finished second in two others in the five weeks leading up to The Masters. At Augusta, Couples carried over his momentum, shooting in the 60s in each of the first three rounds to hold second place heading into Sunday. After a shaky start to his final round that allowed 49-year-old Raymond Floyd to claim the lead, Couples took it back with 18- and 20-foot birdie putts at the 8th and 9th holes, respectively, then saved par on a slick 6-footer at 10. At 12 (perhaps the scariest par-3 in the world), Couples barely cleared Rae's Creek in front of the green. Although his ball rolled back towards the water, it incredibly remained on the bank and he saved par. Sensing that destiny was on his side, Couples held off Floyd the rest of the way, completing Augusta's treacherous back nine with eight pars and one birdie to win his first Major. The win pushed Couples past the $1 million mark in earnings on the season as well, by far the fastest any player had reached that plateau.

Couples is sometimes called "Mr. Skins" because of his dominance in the Skins Game. He has won the event five times (in 1995, 1996, 1999, 2003, and 2004), accumulating over $3.5 million and 77 skins in 11 appearances. Because of his dominance at the Skins and other off-season events like the Johnnie Walker World Golf Championship, Couples is also known as the "King of the Silly Season", referring to the exotic made-for-TV events staged in the winter that are better known as the "silly season". Couples was frequently accused of "choking" in his early career, with mistakes in the 1989 Ryder Cup and the 1990 PGA Championship at Shoal Creek Golf and Country Club often mentioned.

Couples has nine top-10 finishes in the Open Championship, including tying for third in 1991 at Royal Birkdale, shooting a last round 64, and again tying for third in 2005 at St Andrews. In addition to his The Open Championship success Couples played well in many other international tournaments. He won two prestigious European Tour events, the Dubai Desert Classic and the Johnnie Walker Classic, in back-to-back weeks in 1995. He also finished runner-up in three European Tour events in his career: the 1989 BMW International Open, the 1994 Johnnie Walker Classic, and the 1997 Heineken Classic. He also finished runner-up on the Australasian Tour's 1988 Johnnie Walker Australian Classic, Japan Golf Tour's prestigious 1993 Dunlop Phoenix Tournament, and the Asian Tour's 2005 SK Telecom Open.

Since March 1994, back injuries have affected Couples's career. His swing features an extreme shoulder turn at the top, which, combined with the fact that he keeps his left foot flat on the ground throughout the backswing, puts a lot of pressure on his lower back. However, with an abbreviated schedule, Couples is still one of the best players on Tour. In 2003, at age 44, Couples finished 34th on the PGA Tour money list. That year he also won the Shell Houston Open, his first win in five years; Couples wept with joy after the win, but quickly explained the tears, saying: "I'm always emotional when nice things happen to nice people."

In April 2006, Couples challenged at Augusta, making a Sunday run at what would have been his second green jacket before finally losing to eventual winner Phil Mickelson, with whom he was paired in the final round. Had Couples won, he would have been the oldest player ever to win the Masters at age 46 years, 188 days—supplanting Jack Nicklaus, who, coincidentally, won his final Masters 20 years earlier and also at the age of 46. His competitiveness in the tournament was an encouraging sign for his career. "I didn't hit the ball like I was 46," Couples said.

Couples's part in the USA 1993 Dunhill Cup win included victory in all five of his matches, and his overall record reads: played 16, won 12, lost 4. In 2004, Couples won the Dunhill Links Championship Team Event at St Andrews, partnered by New Zealand amateur Craig Heatley.

In 2005 Couples sank a crucial putt in the Presidents Cup, securing an unlikely 1-up victory over the International team's best player, Vijay Singh. This match proved to be pivotal in the contest. Couples has now played Singh three times in Presidents Cup match play, and has yet to lose.

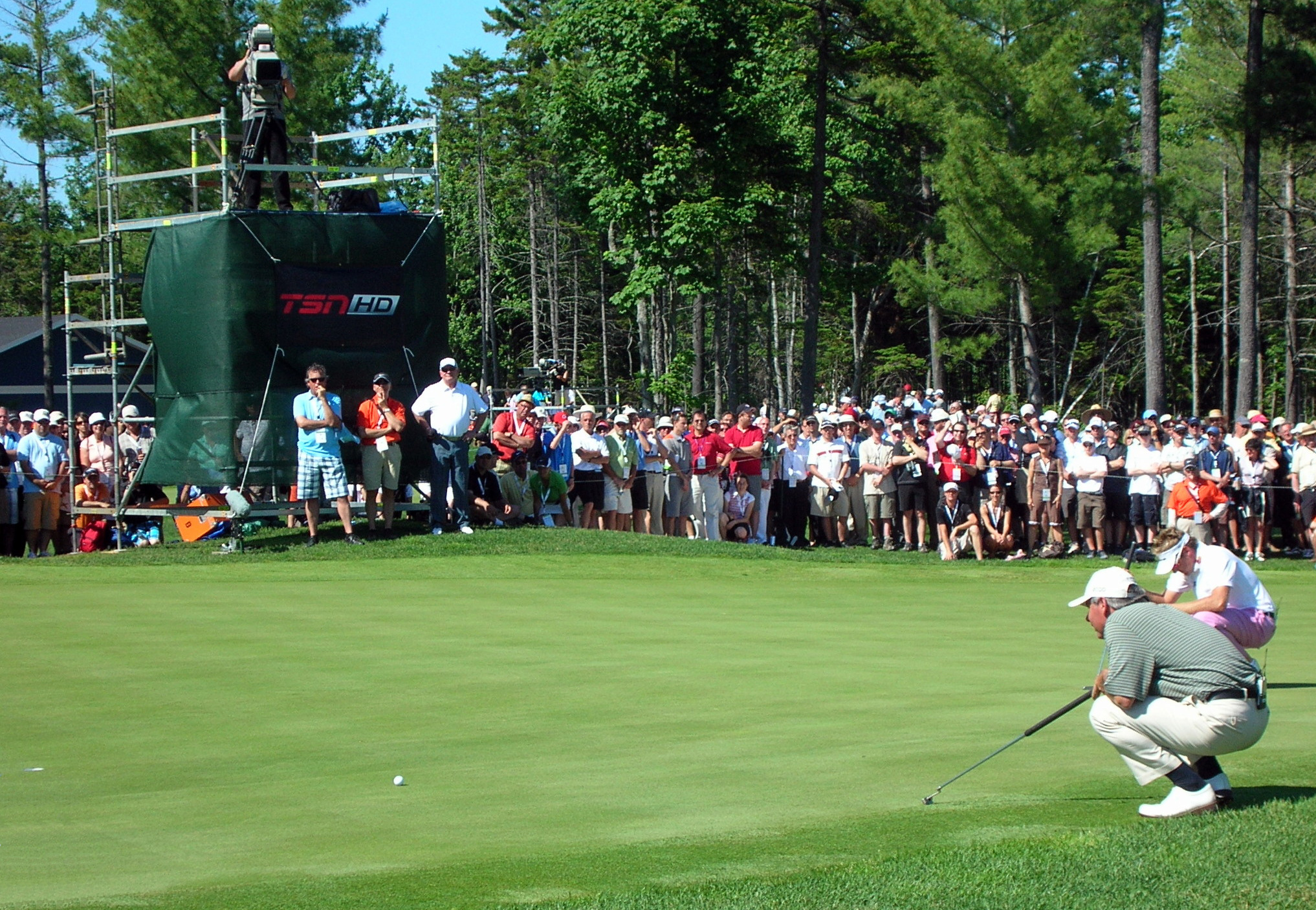
Couples at the 2009 Telus World Skins Game in Lévis, Quebec

Couples was sidelined for virtually the entire 2007 season because of health problems. However, he did compete in the 2007 Masters, making the cut for the 23rd consecutive time, tying the record held by Gary Player. Couples missed the cut in 2008 and 2009.

In 2009, Couples limited his play but performed impressively at the Northern Trust Open. If it wasn't for Phil Mickelson shooting a 62 on that Saturday, Couples may have won instead of finishing third. He nearly won the Shell Houston Open but bogeyed the last three holes and finished third behind Paul Casey. He also played well at the HP Byron Nelson Championship (T8) and the AT&T National (T11) tournaments. He hurt his back practicing for the RBC Canadian Open and had to withdraw. But he rested and recovered and made the cut for the PGA Championship (T36) and performed successfully in the Wyndham Championship (T5) which put him past the $1 million mark on the money list for the 7th time in his career.

Couples was named as Presidents Cup captain for the 2009 United States team on February 26, 2008, and led the U.S. team to a decisive victory nineteen months later.

Couples and Jason Dufner were the 36-hole co-leaders at the Masters in 2012; at age 52, he was looking to become the oldest to win a major. He dropped back with 75 in the third round and finished tied for twelfth.

At the 2023 Masters, Couples became the oldest player to make the cut at a Masters Tournament at the age of 63 years, six months and five days, finishing 1-over-par after the second round. He has made 31 cuts at the Masters, the third most all time.

He is one of the few professional golfers who never plays with a glove.

=== PGA Tour Champions ===
Couples made his debut on the Champions Tour at the opening event of the 2010 season, the Mitsubishi Electric Championship in Hawaii. He nearly won the tournament, finishing second to Tom Watson. Despite the loss, Couples stated, "I had a wonderful time. I think I was 21 under par and didn't win a tournament. That hasn't happened too many times." Had he won, he would have become the 16th player to win his Champions Tour debut. He won his next three starts, The ACE Group Classic, the Toshiba Classic and the Cap Cana Championship, becoming the first player in Champions Tour history to win three of his first four career events. Couples made another run at the 2010 Masters Tournament but finished 6th. It was his 26th top ten finish in a major tournament.

Couples finished second in the 2010 Senior PGA Championship. Later in the same year he finished runner-up to Bernhard Langer in the U.S. Senior Open. Couples had a one-shot lead after 55 holes, but disaster struck on the par 5 2nd hole. He decided to lay up rather than going for the green. His lay-up shot was effective, but his 3rd shot landed in the water. After dropping 4, his 5th shot was driven over the green. He finished the hole with a triple bogey; his one-shot lead became a 3 shot deficit. He played solidly for the rest of the round, but could not catch up to Langer.

Couples earned a 4th win at the Administaff Small Business Classic. On Sunday, he was grouped with Corey Pavin and Mark Wiebe and soared past them and the rest of the field shooting a 9 under 63, with 29 on the back nine. Couples won the Champions Tour Rookie of the Year award in 2010.

Couples was sidelined once again for most of the 2011 season because of his stubborn back problems. But after receiving treatment in Germany, he was able to come back. He won his first major tournament on the senior circuit by defeating John Cook, on the third hole of a sudden death play-off, capturing the Senior Players Championship.

In July 2012, Couples won his second senior major championship when he won The Senior Open Championship at Turnberry. He came from a stroke back to win by two over Gary Hallberg. He made a 25-foot putt for birdie on the last hole to hold off Hallberg, for a round of three under 68 on Sunday. This was his eighth victory in total on the Champions Tour.

In 2016, Couples was forced to forgo the Masters Tournament for the first time since 1994, citing ongoing back problems, which have plagued him throughout his career.

=== Business ventures ===
Couples co-designs golf courses with his design partner, Gene D. Bates. This venture, beginning in 1992 has resulted in the formation of Couples Bates Golf Design firm (Now Bates Golf Design Group), and over 20 award-winning championship golf courses worldwide.

Couples currently takes the supplement Anatabloc and is a brand ambassador for the anti-inflammatory neutraceutical containing anatabine. He wears the brand logo on his left arm of his golf shirts.

Couples has lent his name to two video games: Fred Couples Golf for the Game Gear, and Golf Magazine: 36 Great Holes Starring Fred Couples for the 32X, both published by Sega in 1994.

== Personal life ==
Couples's marriage to his first wife Deborah ended in 1992. They had met as students at the University of Houston in 1979. The divorce was finalized in 1993, and she later jumped to her death in May 2001. The Los Angeles City coroner's office ruled it a suicide. Couples' estranged second wife, Thais Baker, died from breast cancer on February 17, 2009. They had married in 1998 and the union was childless. Couples married his long time girlfriend, Suzanne Hannemann, on February 22, 2022.

Couples currently resides in Newport Beach, California.

Couples, a self-proclaimed "sports junkie," is a member of the Seattle Seahawks 12th Man. He raised the 12th Man flag prior to the Seahawks Monday Night Football game against the New Orleans Saints on December 2, 2013.

Couples is good friends with Michael Jordan and named him one of his assistant coaches when he captained the 2011 Presidents Cup team.

== Awards and honors ==
- In 2007, Couples was inducted into the National Italian-American Sports Hall of Fame
- In 2013, he was elected into the World Golf Hall of Fame
- In 2022, Couples was inducted into the Croatian-American Sports Hall of Fame

== Professional wins (64) ==
=== PGA Tour wins (15) ===
Legend
Major championships (1)
Players Championships (2)
Other PGA Tour (12)

No.	Date	Tournament	Winning score	To par	Margin of victory	Runner(s)-up
1	Jun 5, 1983	Kemper Open	71-71-68-77=287	−1	Playoff	(Taiwan) Chen Tze-chung, (United States) Barry Jaeckel, (United States) Gil Morgan, (United States) Scott Simpson
2	Apr 1, 1984	Tournament Players Championship	71-64-71-71=277	−11	1 stroke	(United States) Lee Trevino
3	May 10, 1987	Byron Nelson Golf Classic	65-67-64-70=266	−14	Playoff	(United States) Mark Calcavecchia
4	Feb 25, 1990	Nissan Los Angeles Open	68-67-62-69=266	−18	3 strokes	(United States) Gil Morgan
5	Jun 30, 1991	Federal Express St. Jude Classic	68-67-66-68=269	−15	3 strokes	(United States) Rick Fehr
6	Sep 22, 1991	B.C. Open	66-67-68-68=269	−15	3 strokes	(United States) Peter Jacobsen
7	Mar 1, 1992	Nissan Los Angeles Open (2)	68-67-64-70=269	−15	Playoff	(United States) Davis Love III
8	Mar 22, 1992	Nestle Invitational	67-69-63-70=269	−19	9 strokes	(United States) Gene Sauers
9	Apr 12, 1992	Masters Tournament	69-67-69-70=275	−13	2 strokes	(United States) Raymond Floyd
10	Mar 14, 1993	Honda Classic	64-73-70=207 (Note: Shortened to 54 holes due to weather.)	−9	Playoff	(United States) Robert Gamez
11	Aug 7, 1994	Buick Open	72-65-65-68=270	−18	2 strokes	(United States) Corey Pavin
12	Mar 31, 1996	The Players Championship (2)	66-72-68-64=270	−18	4 strokes	(Scotland) Colin Montgomerie, (United States) Tommy Tolles
13	Jan 18, 1998	Bob Hope Chrysler Classic	64-70-66-66-66=332	−28	Playoff	(United States) Bruce Lietzke
14	May 31, 1998	Memorial Tournament	68-67-67-69=271	−17	4 strokes	(United States) Andrew Magee
15	Apr 27, 2003	Shell Houston Open	65-68-67-67=267	−21	4 strokes	(Australia) Stuart Appleby, (United States) Mark Calcavecchia, (United States) Hank Kuehne

PGA Tour playoff record (5–4)

No.	Year	Tournament	Opponent(s)	Result
1	1983	Kemper Open	(Taiwan) Chen Tze-chung, (United States) Barry Jaeckel, (United States) Gil Morgan, (United States) Scott Simpson	Won with birdie on second extra hole Jaeckel eliminated by par on first hole
2	1986	Western Open	(South Africa) David Frost, (United States) Tom Kite, (Zimbabwe) Nick Price	Kite won with birdie on first extra hole
3	1987	Byron Nelson Golf Classic	(United States) Mark Calcavecchia	Won with par on third extra hole
4	1988	Phoenix Open	(Scotland) Sandy Lyle	Lost to bogey on third extra hole
5	1992	Nissan Los Angeles Open	(United States) Davis Love III	Won with birdie on second extra hole
6	1992	Honda Classic	(United States) Corey Pavin	Lost to birdie on second extra hole
7	1993	Honda Classic	(United States) Robert Gamez	Won with par on second extra hole
8	1994	Mercedes Championships	(United States) Phil Mickelson	Lost to par on second extra hole
9	1998	Bob Hope Chrysler Classic	(United States) Bruce Lietzke	Won with birdie on first extra hole

=== European Tour wins (3) ===
Legend
Major championships (1)
Other European Tour (2)

No.	Date	Tournament	Winning score	To par	Margin of victory	Runner-up
1	Apr 12, 1992	Masters Tournament	69-67-69-70=275	−13	2 strokes	(United States) Raymond Floyd
2	Jan 22, 1995	Dubai Desert Classic	65-69-68-66=268	−20	3 strokes	(Scotland) Colin Montgomerie
3	Jan 29, 1995	Johnnie Walker Classic	72-67-67-71=277	−11	2 strokes	(Zimbabwe) Nick Price

=== Other wins (33) ===
No.	Date	Tournament	Winning score	To par	Margin of victory	Runner(s)-up
1	Jun 25, 1978	Washington State Buick Open (as an amateur)	211	−5	1 stroke	(United States) Fred Haney
2	Dec 11, 1983	JCPenney Mixed Team Classic (with (Australia) Jan Stephenson)	66-67-62-69=264	−24	5 strokes	(United States) Jane Geddes and (United States) Lon Hinkle
3	Sep 18, 1988	Northwest Open	65-73-68=206	−10	Playoff	(United States) Mac O'Grady
4	Sep 2, 1990	Northwest Open (2)	69-71-70=210	−6	3 strokes	(United States) Greg Whisman
5	Nov 18, 1990	RMCC Invitational (with (United States) Raymond Floyd)	64-57-61=182	−34	5 strokes	(United States) Peter Jacobsen and (United States) Arnold Palmer
6	Dec 9, 1990	Sazale Classic (with (United States) Mike Donald)	65-60-63-66=254	−34	4 strokes	(United States) Curt Byrum and (United States) Tom Byrum
7	Dec 22, 1991	Johnnie Walker World Golf Championship	71-72-72-66=281	−3	4 strokes	(Germany) Bernhard Langer
8	Nov 8, 1992	World Cup (with (United States) Davis Love III)	134-139-140-135=548	−28	1 stroke	Sweden − Anders Forsbrand and Per-Ulrik Johansson
9	Jul 25, 1993	Telus Skins Game	$210,000		$160,000	(United States) Raymond Floyd
10	Nov 7, 1993	Lincoln-Mercury Kapalua International	69-68-67-70=274	−16	4 strokes	(United States) Blaine McCallister
11	Nov 14, 1993	World Cup of Golf (2) (with (United States) Davis Love III)	137-140-141-138=556	−20	5 strokes	Zimbabwe − Mark McNulty and Nick Price
12	Jul 24, 1994	Telus Skins Game (2)	$240,000		$220,000	(United States) Lee Trevino
13	Nov 6, 1994	Lincoln-Mercury Kapalua International (2)	66-71-72-70=279	−13	1 stroke	(United States) Bob Gilder
14	Nov 13, 1994	World Cup of Golf (3) (with (United States) Davis Love III)	132-129-137-138=536	−40	14 strokes	Zimbabwe − Tony Johnstone and Mark McNulty
15	Nov 13, 1994	World Cup of Golf Individual Trophy	65-63-68-69=265	−23	5 strokes	(Italy) Costantino Rocca
16	Nov 20, 1994	Franklin Funds Shark Shootout (2) (with (United States) Brad Faxon)	68-64-58=190	−26	2 strokes	(United States) Mark O'Meara and (United States) Curtis Strange
17	Nov 12, 1995	World Cup of Golf (4) (with (United States) Davis Love III)	133-136-138-136=543	−33	14 strokes	Australia − Robert Allenby and Brett Ogle
18	Nov 26, 1995	Skins Game	$270,000		$30,000	(United States) Corey Pavin
19	Dec 17, 1995	Johnnie Walker World Golf Championship (2)	70-67-71-71=279	−5	Playoff	(United States) Loren Roberts, (Fiji) Vijay Singh
20	Jun 30, 1996	Telus Skins Game (3)	$165,000		−	(England) Nick Faldo
21	Dec 1, 1996	Skins Game (2)	$280,000		$60,000	(United States) Tom Watson
22	Feb 9, 1997	Australian Skins Game	$102,000		$78,000	(United States) Larry Mize, (Australia) Peter Senior
23	Jul 28, 1998	Telus Skins Game (4)	$220,000		$140,000	(United States) Mark O'Meara
24	Nov 14, 1999	Franklin Templeton Shark Shootout (3) (with (United States) David Duval)	61-62-61=184	−32	6 strokes	(United States) Scott Hoch and (United States) Scott McCarron
25	Nov 28, 1999	Skins Game (3)	$635,000		$390,000	(United States) Mark O'Meara
26	Dec 12, 1999	Diners Club Matches (with (United States) Mark Calcavecchia)	1 up			(Australia) Steve Elkington and (United States) Jeff Maggert
27	Aug 8, 2000	Telus Skins Game (5)	$135,000		$35,000	(Spain) Sergio García
28	Dec 9, 2001	Hyundai Team Matches (2) (with (United States) Mark Calcavecchia)	1 up			(United States) Tom Lehman and (United States) Duffy Waldorf
29	Jul 2, 2002	Tylenol Par-3 Shootout	$410,000		$350,000	(United States) Phil Mickelson
30	Nov 30, 2003	The ConAgra Foods Skins Game (4)	$605,000		$380,000	(Sweden) Annika Sörenstam
31	Jun 29, 2004	Tylenol Par-3 Shootout (2)	$270,000		$140,000	(United States) Phil Mickelson, (United States) Lee Trevino
32	Nov 28, 2004	Merrill Lynch Skins Game (5)	$640,000		$30,000	(United States) Tiger Woods
33	Jul 27, 2006	ING Par-3 Shootout (3)	$300,000		$190,000	(United States) Chris DiMarco, (United States) Craig Stadler

Other playoff record (1–2)

No.	Year	Tournament	Opponent(s)	Result
1	1991	Fred Meyer Challenge (with (United States) Raymond Floyd)	(United States) Paul Azinger and (United States) Ben Crenshaw, (United States) Mark Calcavecchia and (United States) Bob Gilder	Azinger/Crenshaw won with birdie on second extra hole Calcavecchia/Gilder eliminated by par on first hole
2	1995	Johnnie Walker World Golf Championship	(United States) Loren Roberts, (Fiji) Vijay Singh	Won with birdie on second extra hole
3	1996	Ernst Championship	(United States) Phil Mickelson	Lost to eagle on first extra hole

=== PGA Tour Champions wins (14) ===
Legend
PGA Tour Champions major championships (2)
Tour Championships (1)
Other PGA Tour Champions (11)

No.	Date	Tournament	Winning score	To par	Margin of victory	Runner(s)-up
1	Feb 14, 2010	ACE Group Classic	68-67-64=199	−17	1 stroke	(United States) Tommy Armour III
2	Mar 7, 2010	Toshiba Classic	66-64-65=195	−18	4 strokes	(United States) Ronnie Black
3	Mar 28, 2010	Cap Cana Championship	67-66-62=195	−21	2 strokes	(United States) Corey Pavin
4	Oct 24, 2010	Administaff Small Business Classic	71-65-63=199	−17	7 strokes	(United States) Mark Wiebe
5	Aug 20, 2011	Constellation Energy Senior Players Championship	68-66-68-71=273	−11	Playoff	(United States) John Cook
6	Oct 16, 2011	AT&T Championship	65-62-66=193	−23	7 strokes	(United States) Mark Calcavecchia
7	Mar 25, 2012	Mississippi Gulf Resort Classic	63-70-69=202	−14	1 stroke	(United States) Michael Allen
8	Jul 29, 2012	The Senior Open Championship	72-68-64-67=271	−9	2 strokes	(United States) Gary Hallberg
9	Nov 3, 2013	Charles Schwab Cup Championship	65-65-68-69=267	−17	6 strokes	(Germany) Bernhard Langer, (United States) Mark O'Meara, (Australia) Peter Senior
10	Mar 16, 2014	Toshiba Classic (2)	65-67-66=198	−15	1 stroke	(Germany) Bernhard Langer, (Scotland) Colin Montgomerie, (United States) Steve Pate
11	Aug 31, 2014	Shaw Charity Classic	68-66-61=195	−15	Playoff	(United States) Billy Andrade
12	Feb 19, 2017	Chubb Classic (2)	68-65-67=200	−16	3 strokes	(Spain) Miguel Ángel Jiménez
13	Jun 25, 2017	American Family Insurance Championship	67-68-66=201	−15	2 strokes	(United States) Scott Verplank
14	Oct 16, 2022	SAS Championship	68-68-60=196	−20	6 strokes	(New Zealand) Steven Alker

PGA Tour Champions playoff record (2–2)

No.	Year	Tournament	Opponent(s)	Result
1	2010	Senior PGA Championship	(South Africa) David Frost, (United States) Tom Lehman	Lehman won with par on first extra hole
2	2011	Constellation Energy Senior Players Championship	(United States) John Cook	Won with birdie on third extra hole
3	2014	Shaw Charity Classic	(United States) Billy Andrade	Won with birdie on first extra hole
4	2020	Mitsubishi Electric Championship at Hualalai	(South Africa) Ernie Els, (Spain) Miguel Ángel Jiménez	Jiménez won with birdie on second extra hole Couples eliminated by par on first hole

== Playoff record ==
PGA Tour of Australia playoff record (0–1)

No.	Year	Tournament	Opponent	Result
1	1988	Bicentennial Classic	(Australia) Rodger Davis	Lost to par on second extra hole

== Major championships ==
=== Wins (1) ===
Year	Championship	54 holes	Winning score	Margin	Runner-up
1992	Masters Tournament	1 shot deficit	−13 (69-67-69-70=275)	2 strokes	(United States) Raymond Floyd

=== Results timeline ===
Results not in chronological order in 2020.

Tournament	1979	1980	1981	1982	1983	1984	1985	1986	1987	1988	1989
Masters Tournament					T32	10	T10	T31		T5	T11
U.S. Open	T48LA			CUT	CUT	T9	T39		T46	T10	T21
The Open Championship						T4		T46	T40	T4	T6
PGA Championship				T3	T23	T20	T6	T36	CUT	CUT	CUT

Tournament	1990	1991	1992	1993	1994	1995	1996	1997	1998	1999
Masters Tournament	5	T35	1	T21		T10	T15	T7	T2	T27
U.S. Open	CUT	T3	T17	T16	T16	CUT		T52	T53	CUT
The Open Championship	T25	T3	CUT	T9			T7	T7	T66	
PGA Championship	2	T27	T21	T31	T39	T31	T41	T29	T13	T26

Tournament	2000	2001	2002	2003	2004	2005	2006	2007	2008	2009
Masters Tournament	T11	26	T36	T28	T6	T39	T3	T30	CUT	CUT
U.S. Open	T16	CUT		T66	CUT	T15	T48			
The Open Championship	6	CUT		T46		T3	CUT			
PGA Championship	CUT	T37		T34		T70	CUT		CUT	T36

Tournament	2010	2011	2012	2013	2014	2015	2016	2017	2018
Masters Tournament	6	T15	T12	T13	T20	CUT		T18	T38
U.S. Open									
The Open Championship				T32					
PGA Championship									

Tournament	2019	2020	2021	2022	2023	2024	2025	2026
Masters Tournament	CUT	CUT	CUT	CUT	T50	CUT	CUT	CUT
PGA Championship								
U.S. Open								
The Open Championship		NT						

Win
Top 10
Did not play

LA = Low amateur
CUT = missed the half-way cut
"T" indicates a tie for a place
NT = No tournament due to COVID-19 pandemic

=== Summary ===
Tournament	Wins	2nd	3rd	Top-5	Top-10	Top-25	Events	Cuts made
Masters Tournament	1	1	1	5	11	20	41	31
PGA Championship	0	1	1	2	3	7	25	19
U.S. Open	0	0	1	1	3	9	23	16
The Open Championship	0	0	2	4	9	10	18	15
Totals	1	2	5	12	26	46	107	81

- Most consecutive cuts made – 13 (twice)
- Longest streak of top-10s – 3 (twice)

== The Players Championship ==
=== Wins (2) ===
Year	Championship	54 holes	Winning score	Margin	Runner(s)-up
1984	Tournament Players Championship	2 shot lead	−11 (71-64-71-71=277)	1 stroke	(United States) Lee Trevino
1996	The Players Championship (2)	4 shot deficit	−18 (66-72-68-64=270)	4 strokes	(Scotland) Colin Montgomerie, (United States) Tommy Tolles

=== Results timeline ===
Tournament	1982	1983	1984	1985	1986	1987	1988	1989
The Players Championship	CUT	CUT	1	T49	CUT	CUT	T23	T4

Tournament	1990	1991	1992	1993	1994	1995	1996	1997	1998	1999
The Players Championship	CUT	T23	T13	T39		T29	1	T10	T42	T4

Tournament	2000	2001	2002	2003	2004	2005	2006	2007	2008	2009
The Players Championship	T33	T58	CUT	10	CUT	CUT	35		T15	CUT

Win
Top 10
Did not play

CUT = missed the halfway cut
"T" indicates a tie for a place.

== Results in World Golf Championships ==
Tournament	1999	2000	2001	2002	2003	2004	2005	2006
Match Play	R16	R64				R32	R32	R64
Championship			NT^{1}		T10	T36	T15	
Invitational	T15				T21	T32	T28	WD

^{1}Cancelled due to 9/11

Top 10
Did not play

QF, R16, R32, R64 = Round in which player lost in match play
"T" = Tied
WD = Withdrew
NT = No tournament

== Senior major championships ==
=== Wins (2) ===
Year	Championship	54 holes	Winning score	Margin	Runner-up
2011	Senior Players Championship	1 shot lead	−11 (68-66-68-71=273)	Playoff	(United States) John Cook
2012	The Senior Open Championship	1 shot deficit	−9 (72-68-64-67=271)	2 strokes	(United States) Gary Hallberg

=== Results timeline ===
Results not in chronological order before 2021.

Tournament	2010	2011	2012	2013	2014	2015	2016	2017	2018	2019	2020	2021
The Tradition		T63	4	2	DQ						NT	
Senior PGA Championship	T2		T12								NT	
Senior Players Championship	WD	1	T4	T2						T22	T8	T3
U.S. Senior Open	2		T12	T14				T4	T44		NT	7
Senior British Open Championship			1	T21	T13	T5		T3	T21	T60	NT	

Win
Top 10
Did not play

DQ = disqualified
WD = withdrew
CUT = missed the half-way cut
"T" indicates a tie for a place
NT = No tournament due to COVID-19 pandemic

== U.S. national team appearances ==
- USA vs. Japan: 1984
- Ryder Cup: 1989 (tie), 1991 (winners), 1993 (winners), 1995, 1997
- Four Tours World Championship: 1990, 1991
- Dunhill Cup: 1991, 1992, 1993 (winners), 1994
- World Cup of Golf: 1992 (winners), 1993 (winners), 1994 (winners), 1995 (winners)
- Presidents Cup: 1994 (winners), 1996 (winners), 1998, 2005 (winners), 2009 (non-playing captain, winners), 2011 (non-playing captain, winners), 2013 (non-playing captain, winners)
- UBS Cup: 2004 (winners)
- Wendy's 3-Tour Challenge (representing PGA Tour): 1992, 1994 (winners), 1996 (winners), 1997 (winners), 1998, 2001, 2004, 2005, 2009

== See also ==
- Fall 1980 PGA Tour Qualifying School graduates
- List of golfers with most Champions Tour wins
