= Cap Cana Championship =

The Cap Cana Championship was a golf tournament on the Champions Tour. It was played from 2008 to 2010 at the Punta Espada Golf Club in Cap Cana, Dominican Republic.

The purse for the 2010 tournament was $1,600,000, with $240,000 going to the winner.

== Winners ==
- 2010 Fred Couples
- 2009 Keith Fergus
- 2008 Mark Wiebe
