= Pat McGowan =

American golfer and instructor

Personal information
- Full name: Patrick Ray McGowan
- Nationality: United States
- Born: November 27, 1954 (age 71) Grand Forks, North Dakota, U.S.
- Height: 5 ft 11 in (1.80 m)
- Weight: 170 lb (77 kg; 12 st)

Career
- Sport: Golf
- College: Brigham Young University
- Turned professional: 1977
- Former tours: PGA Tour; Champions Tour
- Professional wins: 2

Best results in major championships
- Masters Tournament: CUT: 1981, 1984
- PGA Championship: 4th: 1983
- U.S. Open: T13: 1983
- The Open Championship: DNP

Patrick Ray McGowan (born November 27, 1954) is an American professional golf instructor and former PGA Tour player.

== Early life and amateur career ==
McGowan was born in Grand Forks, North Dakota. He attended Brigham Young University. He played on the golf team with fellow PGA Tour player Mike Reid and graduated in 1977.

McGowan developed his game under the tutelage of Warren McCarty, head pro at Colusa Golf and Country Club, and Karl Tucker, golf coach at Brigham Young University.

== Professional career ==
McGowan qualified for the PGA Tour on his first attempt at Fall 1977 PGA Tour Qualifying School, playing at Pinehurst. McGowan was named Golf Digest / Rolex Rookie-of-the-Year in 1978.

One highlight of McGowan's career came in the 1984 Sacramento Classic in the Tournament Players Series during which he defeated Steve Hart in a playoff. Other highlights include a 2nd-place finish in the 1978 Canadian Open to Bruce Lietzke. During the Quad Cities Open in 1982, he was tied for the lead after three rounds with Calvin Peete and Jeff Mitchell. A final round 67 left him tied for second behind Payne Stewart who finished with a 63. McGowan also finished second to Calvin Peete in the 1986 USF&G Classic, while his best finish in a major was 4th in the 1983 PGA Championship at Riviera Country Club.

During more recent years, his game and career have been influenced by Peggy Kirk Bell, his mother-in-law and one of golf's leading instructors, and David Orr, Head Teaching Professional at Pine Needles.

== Personal life ==
McGowan met his wife, Bonnie, daughter of Peggy Kirk and late "Bullet" Bell, at Fall 1977 PGA Tour Qualifying School at Pinehurst in North Carolina.

== Awards and honors ==
In 1978, McGowan was named Golf Digest / Rolex Rookie-of-the-Year.

== Professional wins (2) ==
- 1980 Northern California Open
- 1984 Sacramento Classic

== Playoff record ==
Other playoff record (0–1)

No.	Year	Tournament	Opponents	Result
1	1985	Chrysler Team Championship (with (United States) John Fought)	(United States) Charlie Bolling and (United States) Brad Fabel, (United States) Jim Colbert and (United States) Tom Purtzer, (United States) Raymond Floyd and (United States) Hal Sutton, (United States) Gary Hallberg and (United States) Scott Hoch	Floyd/Sutton won with birdie on first extra hole

== Results in major championships ==
Tournament	1978	1979	1980	1981	1982	1983	1984	1985	1986	1987
Masters Tournament				CUT			CUT			
U.S. Open	T27		T16			T13	T38			
PGA Championship						4	CUT	CUT	CUT	CUT

Note: McGowen never played in The Open Championship.

Top 10
Did not play

CUT = missed the half-way cut
"T" = tied

== See also ==
- Fall 1977 PGA Tour Qualifying School graduates
