= Fall 1981 PGA Tour Qualifying School graduates =

This is a list of the Fall 1981 PGA Tour Qualifying School graduates.

#	Player	Notes
T1	(United States) Robert Thompson	
	(United States) Tim Graham	
T3	(United States) Jay Cudd	
	(United States) Perry Arthur	
T5	(United States) Steven Liebler	
	(United States) Ronnie Black	
T7	(United States) Steve Jones	
T8	(United States) Ron Commans	
	(United States) Rick Pearson	1978 and 1980 champion of Florida State Amateur
	(United States) Al Morton	
T11	(United States) Doug Black	
	(United States) Bill Buttner	
T13	(United States) Kenny Knox	Winner of 1987 Southeastern Amateur
	(United States) Johnny Elam	
15	(United States) Ray Barr, Jr.	
16	(United States) Mike Nicolette	Winner of 1976 NCAA Division II Championship
17	(United States) Michael Burke, Jr.	
T18	(United States) Hal Sutton	Winner of 1980 U.S. Amateur
	(United States) Paul Azinger	
T20	(United States) Scott Steger	
	(United States) Larry Mize	
	(United States) Scott Watkins	
	(United States) Blaine McCallister	
	(United States) Ken Green	Winner of 1978 Azalea Invitational
	(United States) Bob Burton	
	(United States) Clyde Rego	
	(United States) Rocky Thompson	
	(United States) Lance Ten Broeck	
	(United States) Tommy Armour III	
	(Canada) Richard Zokol	Winner of 1981 Canadian Amateur Championship
	(United States) Mike Booker	
	(United States) Buzz Fly	
	(United States) Steve Hart	
	(United States) Skip Dunaway	
