= Spring 1979 PGA Tour Qualifying School graduates =

This is a list of the Spring 1979 PGA Tour Qualifying School graduates.

The event was held at Pinehurst No. 6, a new course at the Pinehurst Resort. The course opened in March and the event was held three months later. There were 150 players in the finals. Top 25 players and anyone tied for 25th place would graduate onto the PGA Tour.

== Tournament summary ==
There were multiple players in the field who were attempting to earn playing privileges after a number of failures. They included Pat Lindsey of Toledo, Ohio who was making his 6th attempt at PGA Tour Qualifying Tournament. In addition, there was Beau Baugh of Tampa, Florida making roughly his 10th attempt.

David Eger took the first round lead at 68 (−4). After two rounds Terry Mauney took a one-stroke lead over Bob Proben at 139 (−5). After the second day the field was reduced from 150 players to 93 players. After third rounds of 71 (−1), Mauney continued to hold a one-stroke lead over Proben. At this point the field was reduced from 93 to 71 players. Vance Heafner, a former "standout" at North Carolina State University, was "in jeopardy" of not qualifying after three rounds. He was in a tie for 23rd place after three rounds, one shot inside the cut-off number. He missed qualifying by a stroke the previous year. In addition, at this point Baugh was in a tie for 27th place, one behind Heafner and one shot outside the cut-off number. Lindsey made the third round cut on the number. However, he was in a tie for 71st and needed to move into the top 25.

Lindsey played excellently during the final round, however. Playing the back nine of Pinehurst No. 6 first, he shot an even-par 36 on this "difficult" stretch. He then went on a "rampage" over his final nine holes. He eagled the par-5 2nd hole, holing a nearly 100 foot putt. He then hit wedge approach shots to within a couple of feet at the 4th and 6th holes for birdies. At the last hole he pulled his approach 60 feet from the hole. At this point he received word that if he went up and down he would make it onto tour. Lindsey hit his chip to a foot to ensure par and graduation. He said after the round it was his "best round ever." His 68 (−4) was the low round of the tournament.

Beau also qualified. Though he, in his words, "didn't do anything outstanding" in the final round he managed to shoot a 71 (−1) to graduate onto the PGA Tour. Heafner, however, failed to qualify.

Mauney and Proben, like they had after the second and third rounds, finished in first and second place respectively.

== List of graduates ==
#	Player	Notes
1	(United States) Terry Mauney	
2	(United States) Bob Proben	
T3	(United States) Dan Pohl	Winner of 1975 and 1977 Michigan Amateur
	(United States) Mike Nicolette	Winner of 1976 NCAA Division II Championship
5	(United States) David Eger	
T6	(United States) Mick Soli	
	(United States) Mike Schroeder	
T8	(United States) Chris Clark	
	(United States) Lee Carter	
T10	(United States) David Thore	
	(United States) John Mazza	
	(United States) Ray Arinno	
T13	(United States) Jim von Lossow	
	(United States) Scott Steger	
	(United States) Beau Baugh	
T16	(United States) Larry Degenhart	
	(United States) Rodney Morrow	
	(United States) Wren Lum	
	(United States) Jeff Thomsen	
	(United States) Mike Colandro	
T21	(United States) David Canipe	
	(United States) Skip Dunaway	
	(United States) Pat Lindsey	
	(United States) Barry Fleming	
	(United States) Ed Byman	
