= Hal Sutton =

American professional golfer (born 1958)

Personal information
- Full name: Hal Evan Sutton
- Nicknames: Prince Hal, Halimony
- Nationality: United States
- Born: April 28, 1958 (age 68) Shreveport, Louisiana, U.S.
- Height: 6 ft 1 in (185 cm)
- Weight: 240 lb (110 kg; 17 st)
- Spouse: Stacy Sutton
- Children: 5

Career
- Sport: Golf
- College: Centenary College
- Turned professional: 1981
- Current tour: PGA Tour Champions
- Former tour: PGA Tour
- Professional wins: 15
- Highest ranking: 4 (April 23, 2000)

Number of wins by tour
- PGA Tour: 14
- Other: 1

Best results in major championships (wins: 1)
- Masters Tournament: 10th: 2000
- PGA Championship: Won: 1983
- U.S. Open: T4: 1986
- The Open Championship: T10: 1999

Achievements and awards
- PGA Tour Rookie of the Year: 1982
- PGA Tour money list winner: 1983
- PGA Player of the Year: 1983
- PGA Tour Comeback Player of the Year: 1994
- Payne Stewart Award: 2007

Hal Evan Sutton (born April 28, 1958) is an American professional golfer, currently playing on the PGA Tour Champions, who achieved 14 victories on the PGA Tour, including the 1983 PGA Championship (a major championship) and the 1983 and 2000 Players Championships. Sutton was also the PGA Tour's leading money winner in 1983 and named Player of the Year.

== Early life and amateur career ==
Sutton was born and raised in Shreveport, Louisiana. He was a promising player at its Centenary College, and was named Golf Magazine's 1980 College Player of the Year. At Centenary, Sutton won 14 golf tournaments, was an All-American, led the Gents to the NCAA Tournament, and finished ninth nationally.

== Professional career ==
Sutton quickly established himself as one of the PGA Tour's top young stars in the early 1980s. His first win was at the 1982 Walt Disney World Golf Classic in a playoff with Bill Britton after the two had tied at 19-under-par 269 after 72 holes.

Sutton's most notable year came in 1983, when he won the Tournament Players Championship in March, followed by his only major title, the PGA Championship at Riviera in August. He entered into a long drought shortly thereafter, going from 1987 to 1994 without a PGA Tour victory. He nearly lost his tour card late in the string, maintaining it only by using a one-time-only exemption for players in the top 50 of the all-time PGA Tour career money list. After this disappointing eight years, Sutton rejuvenated his career in 1995 with a win at the B.C. Open.

In 1998, Sutton won the Valero Texas Open and the prestigious Tour Championship to finish fifth on the PGA Tour money list. Other than his spectacular 1983 season, Sutton had his best year to date in 2000 by beating Tiger Woods in the final group of The Players Championship to win. It was on the 72nd hole of this tournament as his 6 iron approach was in the air that he uttered what is now one of the most famous lines in golf "Be the right club. Be the right club today!". He also had an additional win — the Greater Greensboro Chrysler Classic two starts later. He would go on to finish fourth on the PGA Tour money list. In 2001, Sutton made the cut in 22 of 26 events with one victory at the Shell Houston Open at TPC at The Woodlands and a season winnings total of $1.7 million.

Sutton ranked in the top 10 of the Official World Golf Ranking for over 50 weeks from their debut in 1986 to 1987 and then again for over 50 weeks between 1999 and 2001. He has reached the top five of the rankings.

After playing on four U.S. Ryder Cup teams (1985, 1987, 1999, 2002), he was named non-playing captain of the team for 2004. The competition, played at Oakland Hills Country Club, saw Europe beat the US by 18½ to 9½ points. Inevitably, Sutton came in for some criticism of his performance as captain, especially for his decision to pair Tiger Woods with Phil Mickelson on the first day of play.

In 2007, Sutton received the Payne Stewart Award for his charitable efforts, which include the establishment of the Christus Schumpert Sutton Children's Hospital in his hometown of Shreveport. He also teamed up with Louisianans Kelly Gibson and David Toms to raise more than $2 million in aid to Hurricane Katrina and Hurricane Rita victims. Sutton was also awarded the Omar N. Bradley Spirit of Independence Award in 2004 and the Golf Writers Association of America's 2006 Charlie Bartlett Award with Gibson and Toms for their relief efforts.

Sutton became eligible to play on the Champions Tour in April 2008 and his best finish is a tie for third at the Outback Steakhouse Pro-Am in 2009.

In April 2025, Hal Sutton endorsed Makefield Putters.

== Personal life ==
Sutton is a Republican, having donated money to several GOP causes. He has five children.

== Awards and honors ==
- In 1980, Sutton was selected as Golf Magazine's College Player of the Year.
- In 1982, he was selected as the PGA Tour's Rookie of the Year.
- In 1983, Sutton led PGA Tour's money list.
- In 1983, he earned the PGA Player of the Year award.
- In 1994, Sutton earned the PGA Tour's Comeback Player of the Year award.
- In 2007, Sutton was selected for the Payne Stewart Award.

== Amateur wins ==
- 1974 Louisiana Junior Amateur
- 1979 Western Amateur
- 1980 North and South Amateur, U.S. Amateur, Western Amateur, Northeast Amateur

== Professional wins (15) ==
=== PGA Tour wins (14) ===
Legend
Major championships (1)
Players Championships (2)
Tour Championships (1)
Other PGA Tour (10)

No.	Date	Tournament	Winning score	To par	Margin of victory	Runner(s)-up
1	Oct 31, 1982	Walt Disney World Golf Classic	71-63-68-67=269	−19	Playoff	(United States) Bill Britton
2	Mar 28, 1983	Tournament Players Championship	73-71-70-69=283	−5	1 stroke	(United States) Bob Eastwood
3	Aug 7, 1983	PGA Championship	65-66-72-71=274	−10	1 stroke	(United States) Jack Nicklaus
4	Jun 30, 1985	St. Jude Memphis Classic	65-76-73-65=279	−9	Playoff	(United States) David Ogrin
5	Sep 22, 1985	Southwest Golf Classic	68-67-67-71=273	−15	Playoff	(United States) Mike Reid
6	Jan 26, 1986	Phoenix Open	64-64-68-71=267	−17	2 strokes	(United States) Calvin Peete, (United States) Tony Sills
7	May 25, 1986	Memorial Tournament	68-69-66-68=271	−17	4 strokes	(United States) Don Pooley
8	Sep 17, 1995	B.C. Open	71-69-68-61=269	−15	1 stroke	(United States) Jim McGovern
9	Sep 27, 1998	Westin Texas Open	67-68-67-68=270	−18	1 stroke	(United States) Jay Haas, (United States) Justin Leonard
10	Nov 1, 1998	The Tour Championship	69-67-68-70=274	−6	Playoff	(Fiji) Vijay Singh
11	Sep 12, 1999	Bell Canadian Open	69-67-70-69=275	−13	3 strokes	(United States) Dennis Paulson
12	Mar 27, 2000	The Players Championship (2)	69-69-69-71=278	−10	1 stroke	(United States) Tiger Woods
13	Apr 23, 2000	Greater Greensboro Chrysler Classic	67-64-72-71=274	−14	3 strokes	(United States) Andrew Magee
14	Apr 22, 2001	Shell Houston Open	70-68-71-69=278	−10	3 strokes	(United States) Joe Durant, (United States) Lee Janzen

PGA Tour playoff record (4–2)

No.	Year	Tournament	Opponent(s)	Result
1	1982	Walt Disney World Golf Classic	(United States) Bill Britton	Won with birdie on fourth extra hole
2	1985	St. Jude Memphis Classic	(United States) David Ogrin	Won with birdie on first extra hole
3	1985	Southwest Golf Classic	(United States) Mike Reid	Won with birdie on first extra hole
4	1989	Anheuser-Busch Golf Classic	(United States) Mike Donald, (United States) Tim Simpson	Donald won with birdie on fourth extra hole Sutton eliminated by par on third hole
5	1994	Federal Express St. Jude Classic	(United States) Dicky Pride, (United States) Gene Sauers	Pride won with birdie on first extra hole
6	1998	The Tour Championship	(Fiji) Vijay Singh	Won with birdie on first extra hole

=== Other wins (1) ===
No.	Date	Tournament	Winning score	To par	Margin of victory	Runners-up
1	Dec 15, 1985	Chrysler Team Championship (with (United States) Raymond Floyd)	63-65-68-64=260	−28	Playoff	(United States) Charlie Bolling and (United States) Brad Fabel, (United States) Jim Colbert and (United States) Tom Purtzer, (United States) John Fought and (United States) Pat McGowan, (United States) Gary Hallberg and (United States) Scott Hoch

Other playoff record (1–0)

No.	Year	Tournament	Opponents	Result
1	1985	Chrysler Team Championship (with (United States) Raymond Floyd)	(United States) Charlie Bolling and (United States) Brad Fabel, (United States) Jim Colbert and (United States) Tom Purtzer, (United States) John Fought and (United States) Pat McGowan, (United States) Gary Hallberg and (United States) Scott Hoch	Won with birdie on first extra hole

== Major championships ==
=== Wins (1) ===
Year	Championship	54 holes	Winning score	Margin	Runner-up
1983	PGA Championship	2 shot lead	−10 (65-66-72-71=274)	1 stroke	(United States) Jack Nicklaus

=== Results timeline ===
Tournament	1980	1981	1982	1983	1984	1985	1986	1987	1988	1989
Masters Tournament	52	CUT		T27	CUT	T31	CUT	CUT	CUT	CUT
U.S. Open	CUT	CUT	T19	6	T16	T23	T4	T31	64	T29
The Open Championship		T47LA	CUT	T29	CUT			T11	CUT	
PGA Championship			T29	1	T6	T65	T21	T28	T66	CUT

Tournament	1990	1991	1992	1993	1994	1995	1996	1997	1998	1999
Masters Tournament	CUT		CUT			CUT	CUT			CUT
U.S. Open	CUT	CUT				T36		T19		T7
The Open Championship										T10
PGA Championship	T49	T7	CUT	T31	T55	CUT	CUT	CUT	T27	T26

Tournament	2000	2001	2002	2003	2004	2005
Masters Tournament	10	36				
U.S. Open	T23	T24	CUT			
The Open Championship	CUT		CUT	CUT		
PGA Championship	CUT	T44	T60	T39	CUT	79

Win
Top 10
Did not play

LA = Low amateur
CUT = missed the half way cut
"T" indicates a tie for a place.

=== Summary ===
Tournament	Wins	2nd	3rd	Top-5	Top-10	Top-25	Events	Cuts made
Masters Tournament	0	0	0	0	1	1	16	5
U.S. Open	0	0	0	1	3	9	18	13
The Open Championship	0	0	0	0	1	2	10	4
PGA Championship	1	0	0	1	3	4	24	17
Totals	1	0	0	2	8	16	68	39

- Most consecutive cuts made – 5 (twice)
- Longest streak of top-10s – 2 (1999 U.S. Open – 1999 Open Championship)

== The Players Championship ==
=== Wins (2) ===
Year	Championship	54 holes	Winning score	Margin	Runner-up
1983	Tournament Players Championship	4 shot deficit	−5 (73-71-70-69=283)	1 stroke	(United States) Bob Eastwood
2000	The Players Championship (2)	1 shot lead	−10 (69-69-69-71=278)	1 stroke	(United States) Tiger Woods

=== Results timeline ===
Tournament	1983	1984	1985	1986	1987	1988	1989	1990	1991	1992	1993	1994	1995	1996	1997	1998	1999	2000	2001	2002	2003	2004	2005
The Players Championship	1	T41	T22	T7	T24	CUT	T29	CUT	T68	CUT	CUT	T19	CUT	T53	T50	T18	T4	1	T5	CUT	CUT	CUT	WD

Win
Top 10

CUT = missed the halfway cut
WD = withdrew
"T" indicates a tie for a place.

== Results in World Golf Championships ==
Tournament	1999	2000	2001	2002	2003
Match Play	R64	QF	R64	R64	
Championship	19		NT^{1}		
Invitational	T15	T4	T11	T42	T33

^{1}Cancelled due to 9/11

Top 10
Did not play

QF, R16, R32, R64 = Round in which player lost in match play
"T" = Tied
NT = No tournament

== U.S. national team appearances ==
Amateur

- Walker Cup: 1979 (winners), 1981 (winners)
- Eisenhower Trophy: 1980 (team winners and individual leader)

Professional

- USA vs. Japan: 1983
- Ryder Cup: 1985, 1987, 1999 (winners), 2002, 2004 (captain)
- Nissan Cup: 1986
- Presidents Cup: 1998 (withdrew), 2000 (winners)
- UBS Cup: 2003 (tie), 2004 (winners)

== See also ==
- Fall 1981 PGA Tour Qualifying School graduates
- List of men's major championships winning golfers
