= Bill Britton =

American professional golfer (born 1955)

Personal information
- Full name: William Timothy Britton
- Nationality: United States
- Born: November 13, 1955 (age 70) Staten Island, New York, U.S.
- Height: 5 ft 7 in (1.70 m)
- Weight: 140 lb (64 kg; 10 st)

Career
- Sport: Golf
- College: Miami Dade North; University of Florida
- Turned professional: 1979
- Former tour: PGA Tour
- Professional wins: 5
- Highest ranking: 97 (August 4, 1991)

Number of wins by tour
- PGA Tour: 1
- Other: 4

Best results in major championships
- Masters Tournament: T7: 1990
- PGA Championship: 4th: 1990
- U.S. Open: T60: 1984
- The Open Championship: DNP

William Timothy Britton (born November 13, 1955) is an American professional golfer who played on the PGA Tour for fifteen years during the 1980s and 1990s.

== Early life and amateur career ==
Britton was born and raised on Staten Island, New York, and attended Monsignor Farrell High School. He played college golf at Miami Dade College, and in 1975 he won the National Junior College Athletic Association Championship. He received an athletic scholarship to attend the University of Florida, where he played for coach Buster Bishop's Florida Gators men's golf team in National Collegiate Athletic Association (NCAA) competition in 1976 and 1977. Britton graduated from Florida with a bachelor's degree in health and human performance in 1979. He was mentored by Jim Albus, a club professional and six-time winner on the Champions Tour.

Britton is a two-time winner of the Metropolitan Amateur, and was the two-time defending champion when the tournament was held at Century Country Club in Purchase, New York, in 1977. He advanced to the quarterfinals at Century, and played Lou Mattiace, the father of future PGA Tour player Len Mattiace. In a memorable match, Mattiace dethroned the Staten Island native on the 18th green, 1-up.

== Professional career ==
Britton then turned professional in 1979 and joined the PGA Tour in 1980. During his 15 years on the Tour, Britton won once and had 23 top-10 finishes. His best finishes in majors came in 1990: T-7 at The Masters and 4th in the PGA Championship.

After his years as a touring pro were over, Britton became a teaching pro and author in New Jersey. He has published articles for The Met Golfer, New Jersey Golfer and Sports Illustrated. He has been named one of the "Top Ten Teachers" in New Jersey by Golf Digest. He was New Jersey Section PGA's Player of the Year in 2002, and Senior Player of the Year in 2006. He has played in a limited number of PGA Tour Champions events, playing his last event in 2017. He currently serves as the head men's golf coach for Monmouth University.

== Amateur wins ==
- 1975 Metropolitan Amateur, National Junior College Championship
- 1976 Metropolitan Amateur
- 1979 Azalea Invitational

== Professional wins (5) ==
=== PGA Tour wins (1) ===
No.	Date	Tournament	Winning score	Margin of victory	Runner-up
1	Oct 1, 1989	Centel Classic	−16 (71-66-63=200) (Note: Shortened to 54 holes due to weather.)	4 strokes	(United States) Ronnie Black

PGA Tour playoff record (0–1)

No.	Year	Tournament	Opponent	Result
1	1982	Walt Disney World Golf Classic	(United States) Hal Sutton	Lost to birdie on fourth extra hole

=== Other wins (4) ===
- 1979 Metropolitan Open
- 1986 Westchester Open
- 2005 New Jersey PGA Championship
- 2006 New Jersey PGA Championship

== Results in major championships ==
Tournament	1982	1983	1984	1985	1986	1987	1988	1989
Masters Tournament								
U.S. Open	CUT		T60			CUT	CUT	CUT
PGA Championship	CUT	T77						T41

Tournament	1990	1991	1992	1993	1994	1995	1996	1997	1998	1999	2000	2001	2002	2003	2004
Masters Tournament	T7	CUT													
U.S. Open		CUT		CUT	CUT	CUT									
PGA Championship	4	CUT	T21												CUT

Note: Britton never played in The Open Championship.

Top 10
Did not play

CUT = missed the half-way cut
"T" = tied

=== Summary ===
Tournament	Wins	2nd	3rd	Top-5	Top-10	Top-25	Events	Cuts made
Masters Tournament	0	0	0	0	1	1	2	1
U.S. Open	0	0	0	0	0	0	9	1
PGA Championship	0	0	0	1	1	2	7	4
Totals	0	0	0	1	2	3	18	6

- Most consecutive cuts made – 3 (1989 PGA – 1990 PGA)
- Longest streak of top-10s – 2 (1990 Masters – 1990 PGA)

== Results in senior major championships ==
Tournament	2007	2008	2009	2010	2011	2012	2013	2016	2017
Senior PGA Championship	T68	T16	T33	T75	CUT	T35	CUT		CUT
U.S. Senior Open				T53	T50			CUT	

Did not play

CUT = missed the halfway cut
"T" indicates a tie for a place

== Awards and honors ==
- Britton has been inducted into the Staten Island Sports Hall of Fame.

== See also ==
- Spring 1980 PGA Tour Qualifying School graduates
- 1983 PGA Tour Qualifying School graduates
- 1984 PGA Tour Qualifying School graduates
- 1986 PGA Tour Qualifying School graduates
- 1987 PGA Tour Qualifying School graduates
- 1993 PGA Tour Qualifying School graduates
- 1994 PGA Tour Qualifying School graduates
- List of Florida Gators men's golfers on the PGA Tour
- List of University of Florida alumni
- Staten Island Sports Hall of Fame
