= Pat Lindsey (golfer) =

American professional golfer (born 1952)

Personal information
- Nationality: United States
- Born: May 17, 1952 (age 74) Toledo, Ohio, U.S.
- Height: 6 ft 3 in (1.91 m)
- Weight: 210 lb (95 kg; 15 st)

Career
- Sport: Golf
- College: University of South Florida
- Turned professional: 1975
- Former tour: PGA Tour
- Professional wins: 1

Number of wins by tour
- PGA Tour: 1

Best results in major championships
- Masters Tournament: CUT: 1984
- PGA Championship: T74: 1983
- U.S. Open: CUT: 1980
- The Open Championship: DNP

Pat Lindsey (born May 17, 1952) is an American professional golfer who played on the PGA Tour.

== Early life and amateur career ==
In 1952, Lindsey was born in Toledo, Ohio. He was introduced to golf by his father, an orthodontist, and top amateur golfer. Lindsey graduated of Maumee Valley Country Day School.

In 1975, he graduated from University of South Florida in Tampa, Florida.

== Professional career ==
In 1975, Lindsey turned professional. He spent four-plus years on mini-tours and working as a club professional.

Lindsey had success at Spring 1979 PGA Tour Qualifying School. He competed on the PGA Tour through the 1987 season. His career year in professional golf was 1983 when he finished 67th on the money list with four top-10 finishes including a win at the B.C. Open by four strokes over Gil Morgan. His best finish in a major championship was T-74 at the 1983 PGA Championship.

After retiring as a touring professional in 1987, Lindsey has held various positions in sales and marketing with real estate developers in the Toledo area. After turning 50 in 2002, Lindsey played in a very limited number of Champions Tour events.

== Personal life ==
Lindsey and his wife, Julie, have two daughters, Maggie and Hannah.

== Professional wins (1) ==
=== PGA Tour wins (1) ===
No.	Date	Tournament	Winning score	Margin of victory	Runner-up
1	Sep 4, 1983	B.C. Open	−16 (71-64-65-68=268)	4 strokes	(United States) Gil Morgan

== See also ==
- Spring 1979 PGA Tour Qualifying School graduates
