= Greg Powers (golfer) =

American professional golfer (1946–2026)

Personal information
- Full name: Leo Greg Powers
- Nationality: United States
- Born: March 17, 1946 Albany, New York, U.S.
- Died: September 28, 2026 (aged 80) Winder, Georgia, U.S.
- Height: 6 ft 0 in (183 cm)
- Weight: 186 lb (84 kg)
- Spouse: Frances

Career
- Sport: Golf
- College: Memphis State University
- Turned professional: 1970
- Former tours: PGA Tour; Nike Tour
- Professional wins: 4

Best results in major championships
- Masters Tournament: DNP
- PGA Championship: T26: 1978
- U.S. Open: T30: 1982
- The Open Championship: T31: 1990

Leo Greg Powers (March 17, 1946 – September 28, 2026) was an American professional golfer.

== Amateur career ==
Powers was born and raised in Albany, New York. He had a "brilliant amateur career" while growing up in Albany. Powers attended Memphis State University and played on the golf team from 1967 to 1970. In his sophomore year, Powers led the team to an 8–0 record with victories in the Sunkist Tournament, Buckhalter Tournament, and the LSU Invitational Tournament.

== Professional career ==
Powers turned professional in 1970. He settled in Tennessee and won several local professional tournaments in the state during the 1970s. However it took him several years to reach the PGA Tour. In 1976, he achieved tour status for the second time but found little success, missing the cut in nearly half the events and earning only $4,000 for the entire season. In 1978, he reached the tour for the third time. He had a chance to win an event early in the season at the Doral-Ryder Open. He played in the final group with Jack Nicklaus and Tom Weiskopf for the 36-hole Sunday finale, two off the lead. On the first hole, Powers hit three shots into the water which led to a quintuple bogey 10. He would not be in contention again, ultimately recording a third round 80 (+8). Despite this disappointing finish, Powers went on to his best season up to that point, recording his first top-10 finishes and keeping his card for the first time.

Powers' next good chance to win was at the 1981 Western Open. He tied the 36-hole record at 136 (−8). Like his experience at Doral, however, he had a disappointing third round, shooting a 75 (+3) to fall out of the lead. He shot a solid 70 in the final round, however, birdieing 5 of his final 7 holes, to finish in a tie for second place. This was the best official finish of his career. In 1981, he recorded an additional five top-10 finishes and finish 53rd on the money list. It would easily be his best year on tour.

In 1983, Powers played excellently at two satellite tournaments. He finished runner-up at the 1983 Tallahassee Open. Powers was well inside of Bob Charles, his competitor, on the first playoff hole but Charles made a 45-foot birdie and Powers missed his 20-foot putt. The following month he was −9 after the first 13 holes of the Chattanooga Classic, another satellite event, threatening to shoot in the 50s for the first time in his career. He ultimately shot a 64 (−7) to tie for the first round lead.

He maintained full-time status for the next two seasons but had few highlights, only recording a handful of top-25 finishes and missing the majority of cuts. He would not play full-time on the PGA Tour after the 1988 season. He played on the Ben Hogan Tour, the PGA Tour's developmental tour, in the early 1990s.

On October 5, 1992, Powers was severely injured in a car crash. Returning from a Boys and Girls Club benefit in Nashville, Powers "topped a hill" and had to abruptly stop at an intersection. He hit the brakes too late and his car crossed the intersection and went down an embankment. Rescue workers had to use the "jaws of life" to save him. His thigh bone was ripped out of his hip socket, essentially ending his career. Powers did not have medical insurance for these huge costs, which were nearly $100,000. The following March, during the Nestle Invitational, his fellow professionals participated in a benefit tournament to help him. He also received a letter from Ben Hogan, who himself was severely injured in an auto accident in the middle of his career. Hogan wrote, "I know from personal experience that recovery from an automobile accident is certainly possible. So you keep battling and you will soon overcome this bad interlude in your life." Powers read the letter "a hundred times" as inspiration through rehab.

== Later life and death ==
Later in life, Powers worked for PGA Tour radio.

Powers died in Winder Georgia on September 28, 2026, at the age of 80.

== Professional wins ==
- 1974 Tennessee PGA Championship
- 1975 Tennessee Open
- 1977 Tennessee PGA Championship

== Results in major championships ==
| Tournament | 1969 | 1970 | 1971 | 1972 | 1973 | 1974 | 1975 | 1976 | 1977 | 1978 | 1979 |
|---|---|---|---|---|---|---|---|---|---|---|---|
| U.S. Open | CUT | | | | T63 | | | | | | |
| The Open Championship | | | | | | | | | | | |
| PGA Championship | | | | | | | | | | T26 | |

| Tournament | 1980 | 1981 | 1982 | 1983 | 1984 | 1985 | 1986 | 1987 | 1988 | 1989 | 1990 |
|---|---|---|---|---|---|---|---|---|---|---|---|
| U.S. Open | | T58 | T30 | | | | T55 | CUT | | | |
| The Open Championship | | | CUT | | | | | | | | T31 |
| PGA Championship | | T33 | CUT | | | | | | | | |

Note: Powers never played in the Masters Tournament.

Did not play

CUT = missed the half-way cut
"T" = tied

== See also ==
- 1971 PGA Tour Qualifying School graduates
