= Keith Fergus =

American professional golfer (born 1954)

Personal information
- Full name: Keith Carlton Fergus
- Nationality: United States
- Born: March 3, 1954 (age 72) Temple, Texas, U.S.
- Height: 6 ft 2 in (1.88 m)
- Weight: 200 lb (91 kg; 14 st)

Career
- Sport: Golf
- College: University of Houston
- Turned professional: 1976
- Former tours: PGA Tour; Champions Tour
- Professional wins: 9

Number of wins by tour
- PGA Tour: 3
- Korn Ferry Tour: 2
- PGA Tour Champions: 3
- Other: 1

Best results in major championships
- Masters Tournament: T16: 1983
- PGA Championship: T4: 1981
- U.S. Open: T3: 1980
- The Open Championship: DNP

Keith Carlton Fergus (born March 3, 1954) is an American professional golfer who has played on the PGA Tour, the Nationwide Tour and the Champions Tour.

== Early life and amateur career ==
Fergus was born in Temple, Texas. He started playing golf at age 8. In high school, he played football and basketball but enjoyed practicing golf more than the other sports. He attended and was a member of the golf team at the University of Houston, where he was a 3-time All American and runner-up to Jay Haas at the 1975 NCAA Championship.

== Professional career ==
Fergus turned pro in 1976. He had his best years on the PGA Tour in the early 1980s. During his PGA career, he had over 40 top-10 finishes and won three events. His best finish in a major was a T-3 at the 1980 U.S. Open; he also had a T-4 at the 1981 PGA Championship. He began using the long putter in 1988. Fergus took a break from the tour in 1988 when he accepted the head golf coaches job at his alma mater, the University of Houston, a position he held until 1994.

Fergus resumed tour play in the mid-1990s on both the Nationwide Tour and, on a limited basis, in PGA Tour events. In 1996, at the Nortel Open, he was attacked by a swarm of killer bees and was stung 10 to 15 times; his caddie was stung more than 50 times.

After turning 50 in March 2004, he began play on the Champions Tour. His first win was the 2007 Ginn Championship Hammock Beach Resort, where he became the second player to win on all the PGA Tour sponsored tours (PGA Tour, Nationwide Tour, and Champions Tour), the first being Ron Streck in 2005.

Fergus won the Cap Cana Championship in March 2009 where on Sunday, he shot a five-under-par 67 which included a dramatic holed out eagle 2 on the par 4 17th hole to give him the one stroke victory over Mark O'Meara and Andy Bean. It was his second Champions Tour win.

Fergus has done some course design work and starred in some television commercials. He lives in the Houston suburb of Sugar Land. In his spare time, he enjoys fishing.

== Amateur wins ==
- 1971 Texas State Junior

== Professional wins (10) ==
=== PGA Tour wins (3) ===
No.	Date	Tournament	Winning score	Margin of victory	Runner-up
1	May 24, 1981	Memorial Tournament	−4 (71-68-74-71=284)	1 stroke	(United States) Jack Renner
2	May 23, 1982	Georgia-Pacific Atlanta Golf Classic	−15 (66-72-66-69=273)	Playoff	(United States) Raymond Floyd
3	Jan 23, 1983	Bob Hope Desert Classic	−25 (71-69-65-65-65=335)	Playoff	(United States) Rex Caldwell

PGA Tour playoff record (2–0)

No.	Year	Tournament	Opponent	Result
1	1982	Georgia-Pacific Atlanta Golf Classic	(United States) Raymond Floyd	Won with birdie on first extra hole
2	1983	Bob Hope Desert Classic	(United States) Rex Caldwell	Won with par on first extra hole

=== Nike Tour wins (2) ===
No.	Date	Tournament	Winning score	Margin of victory	Runner-up
1	Apr 17, 1994	Nike Panama City Beach Classic	−14 (66-64-72=202)	2 strokes	(United States) Tommy Armour III
2	Sep 18, 1994	Nike Boise Open	−15 (65-69-64=198)	Playoff	(United States) Bill Murchison

Nike Tour playoff record (1–0)

No.	Year	Tournament	Opponent	Result
1	1994	Nike Boise Open	(United States) Bill Murchison	Won with birdie on second extra hole

=== Other wins (1) ===
- 1976 Texas State Open

=== Champions Tour wins (3) ===
No.	Date	Tournament	Winning score	Margin of victory	Runner(s)-up
1	Apr 1, 2007	Ginn Championship Hammock Beach Resort	−12 (67-67-70=204)	1 stroke	(United States) Hale Irwin, (United States) Mark O'Meara
2	Mar 29, 2009	Cap Cana Championship	−13 (68-68-67=203)	1 stroke	(United States) Andy Bean, (United States) Mark O'Meara
3	May 17, 2009	Regions Charity Classic	−12 (66-66=132) (Note: Shortened to 36 holes due to weather.)	3 strokes	(United States) Gene Jones

Champions Tour playoff record (0–1)

No.	Year	Tournament	Opponent	Result
1	2006	Boeing Greater Seattle Classic	(United States) Tom Kite	Lost to birdie on first extra hole

== Results in major championships ==
Tournament	1976	1977	1978	1979	1980	1981	1982	1983	1984	1985
Masters Tournament	CUT				T26	T37	T33	T16	CUT	
U.S. Open				T9	T3	T43	CUT	T39		
PGA Championship			T38	T60	T50	T4	CUT	T14	T20	CUT

Note: Fergus never played in The Open Championship.

Top 10
Did not play

CUT = missed the half-way cut
"T" = tied

=== Summary ===
Tournament	Wins	2nd	3rd	Top-5	Top-10	Top-25	Events	Cuts made
Masters Tournament	0	0	0	0	0	1	6	4
U.S. Open	0	0	1	1	2	2	5	4
The Open Championship	0	0	0	0	0	0	0	0
PGA Championship	0	0	0	1	1	3	8	6
Totals	0	0	1	2	3	6	19	14

- Most consecutive cuts made – 10 (1978 PGA – 1982 Masters)
- Longest streak of top-10s – 1 (three times)

== See also ==
- Fall 1976 PGA Tour Qualifying School graduates
- 1994 PGA Tour Qualifying School graduates
