= Rex Caldwell =

American professional golfer (born 1950)

Personal information
- Full name: Rex Allen Caldwell
- Nationality: United States
- Born: May 5, 1950 (age 76) Everett, Washington, U.S.
- Height: 6 ft 2 in (1.88 m)
- Weight: 225 lb (102 kg; 16.1 st)

Career
- Sport: Golf
- College: San Fernando Valley State College
- Turned professional: 1972
- Former tours: PGA Tour; Champions Tour
- Professional wins: 4

Number of wins by tour
- PGA Tour: 1
- Other: 2 (regular); 1 (senior)

Best results in major championships
- Masters Tournament: T11: 1984
- PGA Championship: 3rd: 1979
- U.S. Open: CUT: 1981, 1984, 1985
- The Open Championship: CUT: 1982

Rex Allen Caldwell (born May 5, 1950) is an American professional golfer who played on the PGA Tour, Nationwide Tour and Champions Tour.

== Early life and amateur career ==
Caldwell was born in Everett, Washington. He attended San Fernando Valley State College.

== Professional career ==
In 1972, Caldwell turned professional. He played on the PGA Tour from 1972 to 1990. His best year in professional golf was 1983 when he teamed with John Cook to win at the World Cup. He also had six top-10 finishes that year in PGA Tour events which included a win at the LaJet Coors Classic and four solo 2nd or T-2 finishes. His best finish in a major was third place at the 1979 PGA Championship. He has more than $1.3 million in career earnings.

Caldwell also played on what is now the Nationwide Tour in the 1990s. His best finish was a T-2 at the 1994 NIKE Dakota Dunes Open.

After turning 50, Caldwell played on the Champions Tour from 2000 to 2006. His best finish was a T-6 at the 2003 Turtle Bay Championship.

Caldwell has played on several other tours during his regular and senior careers including the Mexican Tour, Texas Tour, Sunbelt Senior Tour and the Heartland Players Senior Tour.

== Personal life ==
Caldwell lives in San Antonio, Texas with his wife, JoAnn.

== Professional wins (4) ==
=== PGA Tour wins (1) ===
No.	Date	Tournament	Winning score	Margin of victory	Runner-up
1	Sep 25, 1983	LaJet Coors Classic	−6 (68-72-76-66=282)	1 stroke	(United States) Lee Trevino

PGA Tour playoff record (0–2)

No.	Year	Tournament	Opponent(s)	Result
1	1983	Bob Hope Desert Classic	(United States) Keith Fergus	Lost to par on first extra hole
2	1983	Phoenix Open	(United States) Bob Gilder, (United States) Johnny Miller (United States) Mark O'Meara	Gilder won with birdie on eighth extra hole Miller and O'Meara eliminated by birdie on second hole

=== Other wins (2) ===
- 1978 California State Open
- 1983 World Cup (with John Cook)

=== Senior wins (1) ===
- Hollywood Casino Senior Classic (Heartland Players Senior Tour)

== Results in major championships ==
Tournament	1978	1979	1980	1981	1982	1983	1984	1985
Masters Tournament			T38				T11	56
U.S. Open				CUT			CUT	CUT
The Open Championship					CUT			
PGA Championship	DQ	3	20	T49	T61	T74	T25	CUT

Top 10
Did not play

DQ = disqualified
CUT = missed the half-way cut (3rd round cut in 1982 Open Championship)
"T" indicates a tie for a place

=== Summary ===
Tournament	Wins	2nd	3rd	Top-5	Top-10	Top-25	Events	Cuts made
Masters Tournament	0	0	0	0	0	1	3	3
U.S. Open	0	0	0	0	0	0	3	0
The Open Championship	0	0	0	0	0	0	1	0
PGA Championship	0	0	1	1	1	3	8	6
Totals	0	0	1	1	1	4	15	9

- Most consecutive cuts made – 3 (twice)
- Longest streak of top-10s – 1

== U.S. national team appearances ==
Professional

- World Cup: 1983 (winners)

== See also ==
- 1974 PGA Tour Qualifying School graduates
- 1988 PGA Tour Qualifying School graduates
