= Lennie Clements =

American professional golfer (born 1957)

Personal information
- Nationality: United States
- Born: January 20, 1957 (age 69) Cherry Point, North Carolina, U.S.
- Height: 5 ft 8 in (1.73 m)
- Weight: 160 lb (73 kg; 11 st)

Career
- Sport: Golf
- College: San Diego State University
- Turned professional: 1980
- Former tour: PGA Tour
- Professional wins: 4
- Highest ranking: 74 (April 21, 1996)

Number of wins by tour
- Korn Ferry Tour: 1

Best results in major championships
- Masters Tournament: T36: 1985
- PGA Championship: T30: 1994
- U.S. Open: T9: 1987
- The Open Championship: T67: 1994

Lennie Clements (born January 20, 1957) is an American professional golfer.

== Career ==
Clements was born in Cherry Point, North Carolina. He played college golf at San Diego State University where he was a three-time All-American.

In 1980, Clements turned professional. He played on the PGA Tour from 1981 to 1998. His best finish was a T-2 at the 1994 Bob Hope Chrysler Classic. His best finish in a major was a T-9 at the 1987 U.S.Open. He also played a few events on the Ben Hogan Tour in 1991 and 1992, winning at the 1992 Ben Hogan Greater Ozarks Open.

== Awards and honors ==
In 1999, Clements was inducted into the San Diego State Aztec Hall of Fame.

== Amateur wins ==
- 1979 California State Amateur Championship, Southwestern Amateur

== Professional wins (4) ==
=== Ben Hogan Tour wins (1) ===
No.	Date	Tournament	Winning score	Margin of victory	Runners-up
1	Aug 2, 1992	Ben Hogan Greater Ozarks Open	−11 (72-66-67=205)	Playoff	(United States) Tommy Tolles, (United States) Ted Tryba

Ben Hogan Tour playoff record (1–0)

No.	Year	Tournament	Opponents	Result
1	1992	Ben Hogan Greater Ozarks Open	(United States) Tommy Tolles, (United States) Ted Tryba	Won with birdie on first extra hole

=== Other wins (3) ===
- 1982 Timex Open
- 1983 Sahara Nevada Open
- 1988 Spalding Invitational

== Results in major championships ==
Tournament	1979	1980	1981	1982	1983	1984	1985	1986	1987	1988	1989
Masters Tournament						CUT	T36			CUT	
U.S. Open	CUT				T13	T16		T24	T9	CUT	
The Open Championship											
PGA Championship				74				67	CUT		

Tournament	1990	1991	1992	1993	1994	1995	1996
Masters Tournament							
U.S. Open					T28		
The Open Championship					T67		
PGA Championship					T30	T39	CUT

Top 10
Did not play

CUT = missed the half-way cut
"T" = tied

=== Summary ===
Tournament	Wins	2nd	3rd	Top-5	Top-10	Top-25	Events	Cuts made
Masters Tournament	0	0	0	0	0	0	3	1
U.S. Open	0	0	0	0	1	4	7	5
The Open Championship	0	0	0	0	0	0	1	1
PGA Championship	0	0	0	0	0	0	6	4
Totals	0	0	0	0	1	4	17	11

- Most consecutive cuts made – 5 (1984 U.S. Open – 1987 U.S. Open)
- Longest streak of top-10s – 1

== See also ==
- 1984 PGA Tour Qualifying School graduates
- 1989 PGA Tour Qualifying School graduates
- 1992 PGA Tour Qualifying School graduates
