= Mike Nicolette =

American golfer (born 1956)

Personal information
- Full name: Michael Rexford Nicolette
- Nationality: United States
- Born: December 7, 1956 (age 69) Pittsburgh, Pennsylvania, U.S.
- Height: 5 ft 9 in (1.75 m)
- Weight: 155 lb (70 kg; 11.1 st)

Career
- Sport: Golf
- College: Rollins College
- Turned professional: 1978
- Former tour: PGA Tour
- Professional wins: 2

Number of wins by tour
- PGA Tour: 1

Best results in major championships
- Masters Tournament: T44: 1983
- PGA Championship: T47: 1983
- U.S. Open: T13: 1983
- The Open Championship: DNP

Michael Rexford Nicolette (born December 7, 1956) is an American professional golfer and inventor who played on the PGA Tour in the 1970s and 1980s.

== Early life and amateur career ==
Nicolette was born in Pittsburgh, Pennsylvania.

He attended Rollins College in Winter Park, Florida and was a member of the golf team. While a student at Rollins, he won the 1976 NCAA Division II Men's Golf Championship.

== Professional career ==
In 1978, Nicolette turned professional. Nicolette had ten top-10 finishes in PGA Tour events during his career including a win at the 1983 Bay Hill Classic. In that tournament, he defeated Greg Norman in a playoff on the first extra hole. He was the first round co-leader at the 1988 U.S. Open but faded in the last three days. His best finish in a major championship was T-13 at the 1983 U.S. Open.

Parsons Xtreme Golf (PXG) hired Nicolette, who served as senior product designer for PING prior to joining PXG. Given no time or budget constraints, Nicolette worked on designing the first iteration of what would become the PXG 0311 forged iron.

Nicolette is named as an inventor on 179 US Utility Patents as of August 2, 2022, the majority of which are assigned to PXG. He is also named on 255 US Design Patents.

== Amateur wins ==
- 1973 Pennsylvania State Junior Golf Championship
- 1976 NCAA Division II Championship

== Professional wins (2) ==
=== PGA Tour wins (1) ===
No.	Date	Tournament	Winning score	Margin of victory	Runner-up
1	Mar 13, 1983	Bay Hill Classic	−1 (66-72-71-74=283)	Playoff	(Australia) Greg Norman

PGA Tour playoff record (1–0)

No.	Year	Tournament	Opponent	Result
1	1983	Bay Hill Classic	(Australia) Greg Norman	Won with par on first extra hole

=== Other wins (1) ===
- 1999 Arizona Open

== Results in major championships ==
Tournament	1983	1984	1985	1986	1987	1988
Masters Tournament	T44	CUT				
U.S. Open	T13	59			CUT	T40
PGA Championship	T47					

Note: Nicolette never played in The Open Championship.

Did not play

CUT = missed the half-way cut
"T" = tied

== See also ==
- Spring 1979 PGA Tour Qualifying School graduates
- Fall 1981 PGA Tour Qualifying School graduates
- 1985 PGA Tour Qualifying School graduates
