= Jeff Mitchell (golfer) =

American professional golfer (born 1954)

Personal information
- Nationality: United States
- Born: August 9, 1954 (age 72) Rockford, Illinois, U.S.
- Height: 6 ft 2 in (1.88 m)
- Weight: 190 lb (86 kg; 14 st)

Career
- Sport: Golf
- College: Texas Tech University
- Turned professional: 1976
- Former tour: PGA Tour
- Professional wins: 2

Number of wins by tour
- PGA Tour: 1

Best results in major championships
- Masters Tournament: T38: 1980
- PGA Championship: T65: 1982
- U.S. Open: 59th: 1980
- The Open Championship: DNP

Jeff Mitchell (born August 9, 1954) is an American professional golfer. He played on the PGA Tour in the 1970s and 1980s. He has also been a head coach in various college men's and women's golf programs.

== Career ==
Mitchell was born in Rockford, Illinois. He attended Texas Tech University in Lubbock, Texas and was a member of the golf team. While a student at Texas Tech, he won the 1975 and 1976 West Texas Championships. Mitchell turned pro and joined the PGA Tour in 1976.

Mitchell was a full-time member of the PGA Tour from 1977–1984. His career year was 1980 when he won the Phoenix Open by four strokes over Rik Massengale after having to Monday qualify, earned $111,217, and finished 37th on the money list. That year he was also first round co-leader at The Masters; he ended the tournament at T38, which was his best finish in a major championship. Mitchell had a dozen top-10 finishes in PGA Tour events during his career.

After retiring as a touring professional in the mid-1980s, Mitchell took various club pro jobs in Texas and Florida before returning to Texas Tech to complete his degree and earn his teaching certificate. Mitchell was men's head golf coach at Stanford University for four years prior to resigning in June 2004. Before that, he was head of women's golf at Texas Tech for 10 years; his last three years at Texas Tech he headed both the men's and women's programs.

Mitchell was a contestant on The Big Break VI: Trump National, the sixth edition of The Golf Channel's reality show, The Big Break.

Mitchell was the women's golf coach at the University of North Texas from 2008 to September 2015.

== Awards and honors ==
In 2000, Mitchell was inducted into the Texas Tech University Hall of Fame.

== Amateur wins ==
- 1975 West Texas Championship
- 1976 West Texas Championship

== Professional wins (2) ==
=== PGA Tour wins (1) ===
| No. | Date | Tournament | Winning score | Margin of victory | Runner-up |
|---|---|---|---|---|---|
| 1 | Jan 20, 1980 | Phoenix Open | −16 (69-67-69-67=272) | 4 strokes | (United States) Rik Massengale |

=== Other wins (1) ===
- 1978 Texas State Open

== Results in major championships ==
| Tournament | 1980 | 1981 | 1982 |
|---|---|---|---|
| Masters Tournament | T38 | | |
| U.S. Open | 59 | | |
| PGA Championship | CUT | | T65 |

Note: Mitchell never played in The Open Championship.

Did not play

CUT = missed the half-way cut
"T" = tied

== See also ==
- Fall 1976 PGA Tour Qualifying School graduates
