= Ronnie Black =

American professional golfer

Personal information
- Full name: Ronald Jay Black
- Nationality: United States
- Born: May 26, 1958 (age 68) Lovington, New Mexico, U.S.
- Height: 6 ft 1 in (1.85 m)
- Weight: 180 lb (82 kg; 13 st)

Career
- Sport: Golf
- College: Lamar University
- Turned professional: 1981
- Current tour: Champions Tour
- Former tour: PGA Tour
- Professional wins: 4

Number of wins by tour
- PGA Tour: 2
- Other: 2

Best results in major championships
- Masters Tournament: T6: 1984
- PGA Championship: T21: 1986
- U.S. Open: T44: 1985
- The Open Championship: DNP

Ronald Jay Black (born May 26, 1958) is an American professional golfer who has played on the PGA Tour, Nationwide Tour and Champions Tour.

== Early life and amateur career ==
Black was born in Lovington, New Mexico. He attended Lamar University in Beaumont, Texas where he was a member of the golf team.

== Professional career ==
In 1981, Black turned pro. He won two events on the PGA Tour during his career both in the mid-1980s. He has more than $3 million in career earnings. His best finish in a major championship was T-6 at The Masters in 1984.

Black began playing on the Champions Tour in 2008. His best finish in his first two seasons was T-2 at the 2009 Dick's Sporting Goods Open.

== Personal life ==
Black lives in Tucson, Arizona.

== Awards and honors ==
In 1993, Black was inducted into the Cardinal Hall of Honor at Lamar University

== Professional wins (4) ==
=== PGA Tour wins (2) ===
| No. | Date | Tournament | Winning score | Margin of victory | Runner-up |
|---|---|---|---|---|---|
| 1 | Oct 9, 1983 | Southern Open | −9 (68-69-65-69=271) | Playoff | (Scotland) Sam Torrance |
| 2 | Jul 15, 1984 | Anheuser-Busch Golf Classic | −17 (69-69-66-63=267) | 1 stroke | (United States) Willie Wood |

PGA Tour playoff record (1–1)

| No. | Year | Tournament | Opponent | Result |
|---|---|---|---|---|
| 1 | 1983 | Southern Open | (Scotland) Sam Torrance | Won with birdie on fourth extra hole |
| 2 | 1989 | Manufacturers Hanover Westchester Classic | (Australia) Wayne Grady | Lost to birdie on first extra hole |

=== Other wins (2) ===
this list may be incomplete

- 1987 Arizona Open
- 1995 Pebble Beach Invitational

== Results in major championships ==
| Tournament | 1982 | 1983 | 1984 | 1985 | 1986 | 1987 | 1988 | 1989 |
|---|---|---|---|---|---|---|---|---|
| Masters Tournament | | | T6 | T41 | | | | |
| U.S. Open | CUT | | CUT | T44 | CUT | | | T54 |
| PGA Championship | | | T34 | CUT | T21 | T28 | T25 | 69 |

| Tournament | 1990 | 1991 | 1992 | 1993 | 1994 | 1995 | 1996 | 1997 | 1998 | 1999 | 2000 | 2001 |
|---|---|---|---|---|---|---|---|---|---|---|---|---|
| Masters Tournament | | | | | | | | | | | | |
| U.S. Open | | | | | | | | CUT | | | | CUT |
| PGA Championship | | | | | | | | T29 | | | | |

Note: Black never played in The Open Championship.

Top 10
Did not play

CUT = missed the half-way cut
"T" = tied

=== Summary ===
| Tournament | Wins | 2nd | 3rd | Top-5 | Top-10 | Top-25 | Events | Cuts made |
|---|---|---|---|---|---|---|---|---|
| Masters Tournament | 0 | 0 | 0 | 0 | 1 | 1 | 2 | 2 |
| U.S. Open | 0 | 0 | 0 | 0 | 0 | 0 | 7 | 2 |
| The Open Championship | 0 | 0 | 0 | 0 | 0 | 0 | 0 | 0 |
| PGA Championship | 0 | 0 | 0 | 0 | 0 | 2 | 7 | 6 |
| Totals | 0 | 0 | 0 | 0 | 1 | 3 | 16 | 10 |

- Most consecutive cuts made – 5 (1986 PGA – 1997 PGA)
- Longest streak of top-10s – 1

== See also ==
- Fall 1981 PGA Tour Qualifying School graduates
- 1982 PGA Tour Qualifying School graduates
- 1990 PGA Tour Qualifying School graduates
- 1994 PGA Tour Qualifying School graduates
- 1995 PGA Tour Qualifying School graduates
