= John Fought =

American professional golfer (born 1954)

Personal information
- Full name: John Fought III
- Nationality: United States
- Born: January 28, 1954 (age 72) Portland, Oregon, U.S.
- Height: 6 ft 0 in (1.83 m)
- Weight: 230 lb (100 kg; 16 st)

Career
- Sport: Golf
- College: Brigham Young University
- Turned professional: 1977
- Former tours: PGA Tour; Champions Tour
- Professional wins: 4

Number of wins by tour
- PGA Tour: 2
- Other: 2

Best results in major championships
- Masters Tournament: T33: 1980
- PGA Championship: 5th: 1983
- U.S. Open: T50: 1976
- The Open Championship: DNP

Achievements and awards
- PGA Tour Rookie of the Year: 1979

John Fought III (born January 28, 1954) is an American golf course architect and professional golfer who has played on the PGA Tour, Nationwide Tour and Champions Tour.

== Amateur career ==
Fought (rhymes with "boat") was born in Portland, Oregon. His grandmother started him playing golf at age 7. Fought attended Brigham Young University in Provo, Utah, where he was a distinguished member of the golf team for four years; he helped the Cougars win four titles at the Cougar Classic, four WAC Championships, and 29 tournament titles overall during his college career. At the end of 1976 Fought was ranked the #6 amateur in the country by Golf Digest. Fought was eventually ranked number one by Golf Digest and won the 1977 U.S. Amateur. He played on the 1976 Eisenhower Trophy and 1977 Walker Cup teams.

== Professional career ==
He turned professional in 1977 and joined the PGA Tour in 1978. Fought played on the PGA Tour full-time from 1979–1985. He has a dozen top-10 finishes including two back-to-back wins in September 1979. He received the PGA Tour Rookie of the Year award in 1979. His best finish in a major was a solo 5th at the 1983 PGA Championship. Injuries to his back and neck in the mid-1980s forced him to retire from full-time tour play. Since then, he has played in a limited number of Nationwide Tour and Champions Tour events.

Fought established a second career as a golf course architect beginning in the late 1980s, founding John Fought Design in Scottsdale, Arizona. Early in this phase of his career, he worked with Bob Cupp Design before starting his own firm in the 1990s. His award-winning designs have included Pumpkin Ridge in North Plains, Oregon, Centennial Golf Course, Oregon, The Reserve Vineyards & Golf Club also in Oregon, and a restoration of an original Donald Ross design at Pine Needles Golf Club in Southern Pines, North Carolina. Other John Fought designs or collaborations include The Gallery Golf Club North and South courses in Tucson (the North course hosted the 2000 Tucson Open and the South course hosted the WGC Match Play in 2007 and 2008). Fought also is responsible for the 2008 redesign of the Dogwood and Azalea courses at The Country Club of Jackson, Mississippi which has hosted the Sanderson Farms Championship on the PGA Tour since 2014. Fought and his wife Mary have three children.

== Amateur wins ==
- 1975 Pacific Coast Amateur
- 1977 U.S. Amateur, Trans-Mississippi Amateur, Broadmoor Invitational
- Sun Devil Classic
- LDS All-Church Championships
- British Universities Amateur Federation

== Professional wins (4) ==
=== PGA Tour wins (2) ===
| No. | Date | Tournament | Winning score | Margin of victory | Runner(s)-up |
|---|---|---|---|---|---|
| 1 | Sep 16, 1979 | Buick-Goodwrench Open | −8 (71-72-68-69=280) | Playoff | (United States) Jim Simons |
| 2 | Sep 23, 1979 | Anheuser-Busch Golf Classic | −11 (69-68-71-69=277) | 1 stroke | (United States) Buddy Gardner, (United States) Alan Tapie, (United States) Bobby Wadkins |

PGA Tour playoff record (1–0)

| No. | Year | Tournament | Opponent | Result |
|---|---|---|---|---|
| 1 | 1979 | Buick-Goodwrench Open | (United States) Jim Simons | Won with par on second extra hole |

=== Other wins (2) ===
- 1976 Northwest Open (as an amateur)
- Provo Open

== Results in major championships ==
| Tournament | 1976 | 1977 | 1978 | 1979 | 1980 | 1981 | 1982 | 1983 | 1984 |
|---|---|---|---|---|---|---|---|---|---|
| Masters Tournament | | 50 | | | T33 | | | | CUT |
| U.S. Open | T50 LA | T58 | WD | CUT | CUT | | | | |
| PGA Championship | | | | | T41 | T61 | | 5 | CUT |

Note: Fought never played in The Open Championship.

Top 10
Did not play

LA = low amateur
CUT = missed the half-way cut
WD = withdrew
"T" indicates a tie for a place

== U.S. national team appearances ==
Amateur

- Walker Cup: 1977 (winners)
- Eisenhower Trophy: 1976

== See also ==
- Fall 1978 PGA Tour Qualifying School graduates
