= 1986 Tournament Players Championship =

Tournament information
- Dates: March 27–30, 1986
- Location: Ponte Vedra Beach, Florida; 30.198°N 81.394°W
- Courses: TPC Sawgrass, Stadium Course
- Tour: PGA Tour

Statistics
- Par: 72
- Length: 6,857 yards (6,270 m)
- Field: 144 players, 75 after cut
- Cut: 144 (E)
- Prize fund: $900,000
- Winner's share: $162,000

Champion
- (United States) John Mahaffey
- 275 (−13)

Location map
- Location in the United States Location in Florida

The 1986 Tournament Players Championship was a golf tournament in Florida on the PGA Tour, held March 27–30 at TPC Sawgrass in Ponte Vedra Beach, southeast of Jacksonville. It was the thirteenth Tournament Players Championship.

John Mahaffey shot 71 in the final round for 275 (−13) and the win, one stroke ahead of runner-up Larry Mize, the 54-hole leader.

Calvin Peete missed the 36-hole cut by two strokes, the first time a participating defending champion did not play the weekend.

== Venue ==
This was the fifth Tournament Players Championship held at the TPC at Sawgrass Stadium Course and it remained at 6,857 yards (6,270 m).

== Eligibility requirements ==
1. Top 125 players, if PGA Tour members, from final 1985 Official Money List:

Curtis Strange, Lanny Wadkins, Calvin Peete, Jim Thorpe, Raymond Floyd, Corey Pavin, Hal Sutton, Roger Maltbie, John Mahaffey, Mark O'Meara, Craig Stadler, Joey Sindelar, Bernhard Langer, Tom Kite, Fuzzy Zoeller, Hubert Green, Larry Mize, Tom Watson, Payne Stewart, Mac O'Grady, George Burns, Wayne Levi, Peter Jacobsen, Andy North, Danny Edwards, Dan Pohl, Phil Blackmar, Bill Glasson, Larry Rinker, Hale Irwin, Mark McCumber, Andy Bean, Jodie Mudd, Scott Hoch, Mark Wiebe, Billy Kratzert, Fred Couples, Scott Simpson, Mike Reid, Wayne Grady, Greg Norman, Jack Nicklaus, Tim Simpson, Bob Tway, Don Pooley, Willie Wood, D. A. Weibring, Bob Eastwood, Ken Green, Dan Forsman, Larry Nelson, Ron Streck, Lee Trevino, Woody Blackburn, Doug Tewell, Bruce Lietzke, Keith Fergus, Brett Upper, Gil Morgan, Clarence Rose, Johnny Miller, Dave Barr, Tony Sills, Buddy Gardner, Gary Koch, Jay Haas, David Frost, Ed Fiori, Mark Lye, Dan Halldorson, George Archer, Gary Hallberg, Lon Hinkle, Donnie Hammond, Jeff Sluman, Bob Murphy, Nick Price, Bob Lohr, Howard Twitty, Loren Roberts, Isao Aoki, Mike Donald, Steve Pate, Russ Cochran, Jim Colbert, Pat McGowan, Bobby Wadkins, Tim Norris, Barry Jaeckel, Paul Azinger, Bobby Clampett, David Ogrin, Morris Hatalsky, Chip Beck, TC Chen, Andrew Magee, Brad Fabel, David Graham, Richard Zokol, Frank Conner, J. C. Snead, Jim Simons, John Cook, Joe Inman, Mark Hayes, Ronnie Black, Chris Perry, Kikuo Arai, Ken Brown, Rex Caldwell, Bill Sander, Mark Pfeil, Nick Faldo, Pat Lindsey, Tom Purtzer, Lennie Clements, Gene Sauers, Leonard Thompson, Bob Gilder, Brad Faxon, Jay Delsing

- Jim Nelford, Jack Renner, Mike Smith, and Denis Watson elected not to play

2. Designated players

Ben Crenshaw, Scott Verplank

3. Any foreign player meeting the requirements of a designated player whether or not he is a PGA Tour member

Sandy Lyle

4. Winners in the last 10 calendar years of the Tournament Players Championship, PGA Championship, U.S. Open, Masters Tournament and World Series of Golf

Dave Stockton

5. The leader in Senior PGA Tour official earnings of 1985

- Peter Thomson elected not to play

6. The three players, not otherwise eligible, designated by the TPC Committee as "special selections"

Dick Mast, Tsuneyuki Nakajima, Arnold Palmer

7. To complete a field of 144 players. those players in order, not otherwise eligible, from the 1986 Official Money List as of the completion of the Hertz Bay Hill Classic on March 16, 1986

Kenny Knox, Jim Gallagher Jr., Mike Hulbert, Antonio Cerda Jr., Andy Dillard, Mike Sullivan, Bill Israelson, David Edwards, Dave Rummells, John Adams, Dennis Trixler, Davis Love III, Tom Sieckmann, Greg Ladehoff, Charlie Bolling, Bill Rogers

General Source:

== Round summaries ==
=== First round ===
Thursday, March 27, 1986

Place	Player	Score	To par
T1	(United States) Keith Fergus	66	−6
T1	(United States) Ken Green	66	−6
T1	(United States) Larry Mize	66	−6
T1	(United States) Tony Sills	66	−6
T1	(United States) Bob Tway	66	−6
T6	(United States) David Edwards	67	−5
T6	(United States) Raymond Floyd	67	−5
T6	(United States) Lanny Wadkins	67	−5
T6	(United States) Willie Wood	67	−5
T10	(United States) Danny Edwards	68	−4
T10	(United States) Mark O'Meara	68	−4
T10	(United States) J. C. Snead	68	−4
T10	(United States) Doug Tewell	68	−4
T10	(United States) Lee Trevino	68	−4
T10	(United States) Mark Wiebe	68	−4

=== Second round ===
Friday, March 28, 1986

Place	Player	Score	To par
T1	(United States) Larry Mize	66-68=134	−10
T1	(United States) Bob Murphy	69-65=134	−10
3	(United States) Dave Rummells	70-65=135	−9
T4	(United States) David Edwards	67-69=208	−8
T4	(United States) Doug Tewell	68-68=136	−8
T4	(United States) Brett Upper	71-65=136	−8
T7	(United States) Mike Hulbert	69-68=137	−7
T7	(United States) Jim Thorpe	69-68=137	−7
T9	(United States) Tom Kite	69-69=138	−6
T9	(Zimbabwe) Nick Price	71-67=138	−6
T9	(United States) Payne Stewart	71-67=138	−6

=== Third round ===
Saturday, March 29, 1986

Place	Player	Score	To par
1	(United States) Larry Mize	66-68-66=200	−16
2	(United States) John Mahaffey	69-70-65=204	−12
T3	(United States) Bob Murphy	69-65-74=208	−8
T3	(United States) Tim Simpson	72-70-66=208	−8
T5	(United States) Tom Kite	69-69-71=209	−7
T5	(United States) Brett Upper	71-65-73=209	−7
T7	(United States) Dick Mast	69-73-68=210	−6
T7	(United States) Doug Tewell	68-68-74=210	−6
T9	(United States) Tony Sills	71-73-70=211	−5
T9	(United States) Jim Simons	69-72-70=211	−5
T9	(United States) Hal Sutton	71-72-68=211	−5
T9	(United States) Jim Thorpe	69-68-74=211	−5
T9	(United States) Lee Trevino	68-73-70=211	−5
T9	(United States) Bob Tway	66-73-72=211	−5

=== Final round ===
Sunday, March 30, 1986

Champion
(c) = past champion

Place	Player	Score	To par	Money ($)
1	(United States) John Mahaffey	69-70-65-71=275	−13	162,000
2	(United States) Larry Mize	66-68-66-76=276	−12	97,200
3	(United States) Tim Simpson	72-70-66-72=280	−8	61,200
T4	(United States) Tom Kite	69-69-71-72=281	−7	37,200
T4	(United States) Jim Thorpe	69-68-74-70=281	−7	37,200
T4	(United States) Brett Upper	71-65-73-72=281	−7	37,200
T7	(United States) John Cook	71-73-70-68=282	−6	28,050
T7	(United States) Jay Haas	73-68-73-68=282	−6	28,050
T7	(United States) Hal Sutton (c)	71-72-68-71=282	−6	28,050
T10	(United States) Dave Rummells	70-65-79-69=283	−5	21,600
T10	(United States) Payne Stewart	71-67-75-70=283	−5	21,600
T10	(United States) Doug Tewell	68-68-74-73=283	−5	21,600
T10	(United States) Bob Tway	66-73-72-72=283	−5	21,600

Leaderboard below the top 10
Place	Player	Score	To par	Money ($)
T14	(United States) Scott Hoch	69-74-71-70=284	−4	16,200
T14	(United States) Davis Love III	71-71-75-67=284	−4	16,200
T14	(United States) Bob Murphy	69-65-74-76=284	−4	16,200
T17	(United States) Ronnie Black	70-71-74-70=285	−3	13,950
T17	(United States) Joey Sindelar	70-70-73-72=285	−3	13,950
T19	(United States) David Edwards	67-69-76-74=286	−2	12,150
T19	(United States) Jim Simons	69-72-70-75=286	−2	12,150
T21	(United States) Andy Bean	70-73-72-72=287	−1	7,627
T21	(United States) Charlie Bolling	73-70-73-71=287	−1	7,627
T21	(United States) Jim Colbert	73-70-73-71=287	−1	7,627
T21	(United States) Danny Edwards	68-72-74-73=287	−1	7,627
T21	(United States) Keith Fergus	66-73-73-75=287	−1	7,627
T21	(United States) Raymond Floyd (c)	67-73-75-72=287	−1	7,627
T21	(United States) Kenny Knox	71-73-69-74=287	−1	7,627
T21	(United States) Gary Koch	72-70-72-73=287	−1	7,627
T21	(United States) Dick Mast	69-73-68-77=287	−1	7,627
T21	(United States) Larry Rinker	72-70-75-70=287	−1	7,627
T21	(United States) Tom Sieckmann	70-69-77-71=287	−1	7,627
T21	(United States) Lee Trevino (c)	68-73-70-76=287	−1	7,627
T33	(United States) Ken Green	66-75-76-71=288	E	4,654
T33	(United States) Morris Hatalsky	74-70-69-75=288	E	4,654
T33	(United States) Peter Jacobsen	72-69-72-75=288	E	4,654
T33	(Australia) Greg Norman	70-71-77-70=288	E	4,654
T33	(United States) Mark O'Meara	68-74-74-72=288	E	4,654
T33	(United States) Tony Sills	66-75-70-77=288	E	4,654
T33	(United States) D. A. Weibring	70-71-74-73=288	E	4,654
T40	(United States) Mike Donald	73-71-72-73=289	+1	3,240
T40	(West Germany) Bernhard Langer	70-73-73-73=289	+1	3,240
T40	(United States) Bruce Lietzke	70-71-75-73=289	+1	3,240
T40	(United States) David Ogrin	70-74-71-74=289	+1	3,240
T40	(United States) Loren Roberts	70-73-73-73=289	+1	3,240
T40	(United States) Jeff Sluman	70-74-75-70=289	+1	3,240
T40	(United States) Mike Sullivan	72-68-75-74=289	+1	3,240
T40	(United States) Lanny Wadkins (c)	67-73-76-73=289	+1	3,240
T48	(South Africa) David Frost	70-69-75-76=290	+2	2,262
T48	(United States) Wayne Levi	73-71-76-70=290	+2	2,262
T48	(United States) Roger Maltbie	70-73-79-68=290	+2	2,262
T48	(United States) Mark Pfeil	69-74-70-77=290	+2	2,262
T48	(United States) Tom Purtzer	72-70-77-71=290	+2	2,262
T48	(United States) Dave Stockton	72-72-76-70=290	+2	2,262
T54	(United States) Ben Crenshaw	73-71-73-74=291	+3	2,061
T54	(United States) Tim Norris	74-68-74-75=291	+3	2,061
T54	(United States) Chris Perry	69-72-72-78=291	+3	2,061
T54	(United States) Mark Wiebe	68-72-78-73=291	+3	2,061
T58	(United States) Frank Conner	70-73-77-72=292	+4	1,971
T58	(United States) Mike Hulbert	69-68-78-77=292	+4	1,971
T58	(United States) Gil Morgan	70-73-73-76=292	+4	1,971
T58	(United States) Corey Pavin	70-72-72-78=292	+4	1,971
T58	(Zimbabwe) Nick Price	71-67-75-79=292	+4	1,971
T58	(United States) Tom Watson	70-74-74-74=292	+4	1,971
T64	(United States) Paul Azinger	70-71-77-75=293	+5	1,890
T64	(Canada) Dave Barr	69-72-73-79=293	+5	1,890
T64	(Japan) Tsuneyuki Nakajima	69-75-78-71=293	+5	1,890
T67	(Scotland) Ken Brown	72-71-76-75=294	+6	1,818
T67	(Taiwan) Chen Tze-chung	71-69-82-72=294	+6	1,818
T67	(United States) Barry Jaeckel	70-73-76-75=294	+6	1,818
T67	(United States) J. C. Snead	68-73-74-79=294	+6	1,818
T67	(United States) Dennis Trixler	71-73-74-76=294	+6	1,818
T72	(United States) Greg Ladehoff	73-69-78-76=296	+8	1,755
T72	(United States) Steve Pate	71-72-78-75=296	+8	1,755
74	(United States) Willie Wood	67-73-77-80=297	+9	1,728
75	(United States) George Burns	71-73-75-80=299	+11	1,710
CUT	(United States) George Archer	71-74=145	+1	
CUT	(United States) Lennie Clements	72-73=145	+1	
CUT	(United States) Brad Faxon	72-73=145	+1	
CUT	(United States) Dan Forsman	75-70=145	+1	
CUT	(United States) Buddy Gardner	73-72=145	+1	
CUT	(United States) Bob Gilder	71-74=145	+1	
CUT	(United States) Bill Glasson	75-70=145	+1	
CUT	(United States) Hubert Green	72-73=145	+1	
CUT	(United States) Mark Lye	73-72=145	+1	
CUT	(Scotland) Sandy Lyle	74-71=145	+1	
CUT	(United States) Johnny Miller	70-75=145	+1	
CUT	(United States) Jodie Mudd	72-73=145	+1	
CUT	(United States) Scott Simpson	74-71=145	+1	
CUT	(United States) Leonard Thompson	70-75=145	+1	
CUT	(United States) Chip Beck	77-69=146	+2	
CUT	(United States) Jay Delsing	73-73=146	+2	
CUT	(United States) Bob Eastwood	72-74=146	+2	
CUT	(United States) Brad Fabel	71-75=146	+2	
CUT	(United States) Jim Gallagher Jr.	74-72=146	+2	
CUT	(Canada) Dan Halldorson	70-76=146	+2	
CUT	(United States) Bill Israelson	74-72=146	+2	
CUT	(United States) Calvin Peete (c)	73-73=146	+2	
CUT	(United States) Mike Reid	71-75=146	+2	
CUT	(United States) Bill Rogers	71-75=146	+2	
CUT	(United States) Bill Sander	74-72=146	+2	
CUT	(United States) Gene Sauers	73-73=146	+2	
CUT	(United States) Curtis Strange	74-72=146	+2	
CUT	(United States) Ron Streck	73-73=146	+2	
CUT	(United States) Rex Caldwell	77-70=147	+3	
CUT	(United States) Russ Cochran	73-74=147	+3	
CUT	(United States) Andy Dillard	71-76=147	+3	
CUT	(England) Nick Faldo	69-78=147	+3	
CUT	(United States) Ed Fiori	74-73=147	+3	
CUT	(United States) Hale Irwin	75-72=147	+3	
CUT	(United States) Billy Kratzert	77-70=147	+3	
CUT	(United States) Pat Lindsey	72-75=147	+3	
CUT	(United States) Pat McGowan	74-73=147	+3	
CUT	(United States) Jack Nicklaus (c)	74-73=147	+3	
CUT	(United States) Craig Stadler	75-72=147	+3	
CUT	(United States) Howard Twitty	71-76=147	+3	
CUT	(United States) Bobby Wadkins	71-76=147	+3	
CUT	(United States) Woody Blackburn	70-78=148	+4	
CUT	(United States) Bob Lohr	74-74=148	+4	
CUT	(United States) Andrew Magee	72-76=148	+4	
CUT	(United States) Mark McCumber	75-73=148	+4	
CUT	(United States) Fuzzy Zoeller	72-76=148	+4	
CUT	(United States) Mark Hayes (c)	72-77=149	+5	
CUT	(United States) Joe Inman	73-76=149	+5	
CUT	(United States) Larry Nelson	72-77=149	+5	
CUT	(United States) Scott Verplank	72-77=149	+5	
CUT	(Japan) Kikuo Arai	71-79=150	+6	
CUT	(Mexico) Antonio Cerda Jr.	75-75=150	+6	
CUT	(United States) Bobby Clampett	74-76=150	+6	
CUT	(Australia) David Graham	75-75=150	+6	
CUT	(United States) Gary Hallberg	74-76=150	+6	
CUT	(United States) Andy North	72-78=150	+6	
CUT	(United States) Dan Pohl	74-76=150	+6	
CUT	(United States) Don Pooley	71-79=150	+6	
CUT	(United States) Mac O'Grady	72-79=151	+7	
CUT	(Canada) Richard Zokol	76-75=151	+7	
CUT	(United States) John Adams	75-77=152	+8	
CUT	(Japan) Isao Aoki	74-78=152	+8	
CUT	(United States) Arnold Palmer	75-77=152	+8	
CUT	(Australia) Wayne Grady	82-71=153	+9	
CUT	(United States) Lon Hinkle	74-80=154	+10	
CUT	(United States) Phil Blackmar	79-76=155	+11	
CUT	(United States) Clarence Rose	80-76=156	+12	
CUT	(United States) Fred Couples (c)	77-80=157	+13	
WD	(United States) Donnie Hammond	82	+10	
