= 1987 Tournament Players Championship =

Tournament information
- Dates: March 26–29, 1987
- Location: Ponte Vedra Beach, Florida; 30.198°N 81.394°W
- Courses: TPC Sawgrass, Stadium Course
- Tour: PGA Tour

Statistics
- Par: 72
- Length: 6,857 yards (6,270 m)
- Field: 144 players, 72 after cut
- Cut: 143 (−1)
- Prize fund: $1.0 million
- Winner's share: $180,000

Champion
- (Scotland) Sandy Lyle
- 274 (−14), playoff

Location map
- Location in the United States Location in Florida

The 1987 Tournament Players Championship was a golf tournament in Florida on the PGA Tour, held March 26–29 at TPC Sawgrass in Ponte Vedra Beach, southeast of Jacksonville. It was the fourteenth Tournament Players Championship.

Sandy Lyle of Scotland defeated Jeff Sluman on the third hole of a sudden-death playoff to become the first international player to win the title. Rains had softened the course and led to favorable scoring; the 36-hole cut of 143 (−1) was the lowest until 1993.

At the second playoff hole, the par-3 17th "Island Green," an unruly spectator jumped into the water as Sluman was addressing his six-foot (1.8 m) birdie putt for the win. After order was restored, he missed and they went to third extra hole at 18. Both found the fairway with their tee shots but both approaches went deep. Sluman couldn't save par from twelve feet (3.7 m) while Lyle made his from seven feet (2.1 m) to end it.

This was the second playoff at the Tournament Players Championship, but the first at the Stadium Course. This year also marked the championship's first seven-figure purse and its last with "Tournament" in the title.

Defending champion John Mahaffey finished ten strokes back, in a tie for 32nd place.

== Venue ==
This was the sixth Tournament Players Championship held at the TPC at Sawgrass Stadium Course and it remained at 6,857 yards (6,270 m).

== Eligibility requirements ==
1. Top 126 players, if PGA Tour members, from Final 1986 Official Money List:

Greg Norman, Bob Tway, Payne Stewart, Andy Bean, Dan Pohl, Hal Sutton, Tom Kite, Ben Crenshaw, Raymond Floyd, Bernhard Langer, John Mahaffey, Calvin Peete, Fuzzy Zoeller, Joey Sindelar, Jim Thorpe, Ken Green, Larry Mize, Doug Tewell, Corey Pavin, Tom Watson, Mike Hulbert, Don Pooley, Lanny Wadkins, Kenny Knox, Mark Wiebe, John Cook, Donnie Hammond, Paul Azinger, Mark O'Meara, Tim Simpson, Curtis Strange, Bobby Wadkins, Jack Nicklaus, Nick Price, Scott Hoch, Tom Purtzer, Chip Beck, Roger Maltbie, Scott Simpson, Gene Sauers, Phil Blackmar, Clarence Rose, Jay Haas, David Frost, Bruce Lietzke, Jodie Mudd, Bob Murphy, Gary Koch, Steve Pate, Willie Wood, Craig Stadler, Dan Forsman, D. A. Weibring, Ronnie Black, Howard Twitty, Mark Calcavecchia, Wayne Levi, Jeff Sluman, Rick Fehr, J. C. Snead, Sandy Lyle, Pat McGowan, Mike Reid, Danny Edwards, Ernie Gonzalez, Larry Nelson, Dave Barr, David Edwards, Bill Glasson, Hubert Green, Mark Hayes, Brian Claar, Fred Couples, Davis Love III, Peter Jacobsen, Lennie Clements, Mark McCumber, Jim Colbert, Mike Donald, Morris Hatalsky, Bob Gilder, Lon Hinkle, Bobby Clampett, David Graham, Brett Upper, Brad Faxon, Buddy Gardner, Russ Cochran, Tom Byrum, Blaine McCallister, Bobby Cole, Charlie Bolling, TC Chen, Lee Trevino, Bob Lohr, Jack Renner, Dan Halldorson, Leonard Thompson, Dave Rummells, George Archer, Barry Jaeckel, Larry Rinker, Jim Gallagher Jr., Curt Byrum, Dick Mast, Ken Brown, Mark Lye, George Burns, David Ogrin, Chris Perry, Fred Wadsworth, Andy Dillard, Bob Eastwood, Johnny Miller, Ed Fiori, Andrew Magee, Gary Hallberg, Mark Pfeil, Jay Delsing, John Adams, Tom Sieckmann, Antonio Cerda, Jr.

- Mac O'Grady, Gil Morgan, Mike Sullivan, and Tony Sills elected not to play

2. Designated players

Andy North

3. Any foreign player meeting the requirements of a designated player, whether or not he is a PGA Tour member

Seve Ballesteros

4. Winners in the last 10 calendar years of the Tournament Players Championship, PGA Championship, U.S. Open, Masters Tournament and World Series of Golf

Hale Irwin, Bill Rogers

5. The leader in Senior PGA Tour official earnings of 1986

- Bruce Crampton elected not to play

6. The three players, not otherwise eligible, designated by the TPC Committee as "special selections"

Rodger Davis, Dave Stockton

7. To complete a field of 144 players, those players in order, not otherwise eligible, from the 1987 Official Money List, as of the completion of the USF&G Classic, March 22, 1987

Isao Aoki, Keith Clearwater, Steve Elkington, Sam Randolph, Brad Fabel, Bill Sander, Tsuneyuki Nakajima, Steve Jones, Rick Dalpos, Rocco Mediate, Jay Don Blake, John Inman, Mark Brooks, Denis Watson, Richard Zokol, Mike Nicolette

General source:

== Round summaries ==
=== First round ===
Thursday, March 26, 1987
Friday, March 27, 1987

Place	Player	Score	To par
1	(United States) Steve Jones	66	−6
T2	(United States) Bob Eastwood	67	−5
T2	(United States) Brad Fabel	67	−5
T2	(Scotland) Sandy Lyle	67	−5
T2	(Australia) Greg Norman	67	−5
T6	(Japan) Isao Aoki	68	−4
T6	(United States) Paul Azinger	68	−4
T6	(United States) Mark Brooks	68	−4
T6	(United States) Hale Irwin	68	−4
T6	(United States) Wayne Levi	68	−4
T6	(United States) Blaine McCallister	68	−4
T6	(United States) Mark O'Meara	68	−4
T6	(United States) Chris Perry	68	−4
T6	(United States) Dan Pohl	68	−4
T6	(United States) Dave Rummells	68	−4
T6	(United States) Gene Sauers	68	−4
T6	(United States) Hal Sutton	68	−4

=== Second round ===
Friday, March 27, 1987
Saturday, March 28, 1987

Place	Player	Score	To par
T1	(United States) Steve Jones	66-67=133	−11
T1	(United States) Mark O'Meara	68-65=133	−11
T3	(United States) Dan Pohl	68-66=134	−10
T3	(United States) Scott Simpson	69-65=134	−10
T5	(United States) Brad Fabel	67-68=135	−9
T5	(Australia) Greg Norman	67-68=135	−9
T7	(United States) Hale Irwin	68-68=136	−8
T7	(United States) Tom Purtzer	69-67=136	−8
T7	(United States) Jeff Sluman	70-66=136	−8
10	(United States) Curt Byrum	69-68=137	−7

=== Third round ===
Saturday, March 28, 1987

Place	Player	Score	To par
T1	(United States) Mark O'Meara	68-65-69=202	−14
T1	(United States) Scott Simpson	69-65-68=202	−14
T3	(United States) Ben Crenshaw	70-68-66=204	−12
T3	(Scotland) Sandy Lyle	67-71-66=204	−12
5	(United States) Jeff Sluman	70-66-69=205	−11
6	(United States) Paul Azinger	68-70-68=206	−10
6	(United States) Bill Glasson	69-69-68=206	−10
6	(Australia) Greg Norman	67-68-71=206	−10
9	(Zimbabwe) Nick Price	71-68-68=207	−9
10	(United States) Tom Purtzer	69-67-72=208	−8

=== Final round ===
Sunday, March 29, 1987

On the 72nd hole, Lyle and Sluman both made birdie putts to finish at 274 (−14) and advanced to the playoff.

Champion
(c) = past champion

Place	Player	Score	To par	Money ($)
T1	(Scotland) Sandy Lyle	67-71-66-70=274	−14	Playoff
T1	(United States) Jeff Sluman	70-66-69-69=274	−14	Playoff
3	(United States) Mark O'Meara	68-65-69-73=275	−13	68,000
T4	(Australia) Greg Norman	67-68-71-70=276	−12	44,000
T4	(United States) Scott Simpson	69-65-68-74=276	−12	44,000
6	(United States) Paul Azinger	68-70-68-71=277	−11	36,000
T7	(United States) Bill Glasson	69-69-68-72=278	−10	32,250
T7	(United States) Dan Pohl	68-66-75-69=278	−10	32,250
T9	(United States) Ben Crenshaw	70-68-66-75=279	−9	27,000
T9	(United States) Tom Kite	72-70-67-70=279	−9	27,000
T9	(United States) Tom Purtzer	69-67-72-71=279	−9	27,000

Leaderboard below the top 10
Place	Player	Score	To par	Money ($)
T12	(United States) Brad Fabel	67-68-75-70=280	−8	21,000
T12	(United States) Mark McCumber	69-71-69-71=280	−8	21,000
T12	(United States) Larry Mize	70-70-69-71=280	−8	21,000
T15	(South Africa) David Frost	70-69-71-71=281	−7	16,000
T15	(United States) Hubert Green	69-71-72-69=281	−7	16,000
T15	(United States) Steve Jones	66-67-76-72=281	−7	16,000
T15	(Japan) Tsuneyuki Nakajima	69-70-70-72=281	−7	16,000
T15	(United States) Mike Reid	72-69-69-71=281	−7	16,000
T20	(United States) Keith Clearwater	73-70-71-68=282	−6	11,650
T20	(United States) Morris Hatalsky	73-69-70-70=282	−6	11,650
T20	(United States) Chris Perry	68-71-70-73=282	−6	11,650
T20	(United States) Mark Wiebe	70-69-71-72=282	−6	11,650
T24	(Japan) Isao Aoki	68-73-72-70=283	−5	7,737
T24	(United States) Buddy Gardner	69-69-75-70=283	−5	7,737
T24	(United States) Ken Green	71-72-69-71=283	−5	7,737
T24	(United States) Mike Hulbert	71-71-71-70=283	−5	7,737
T24	(United States) Hale Irwin	68-68-74-73=283	−5	7,737
T24	(West Germany) Bernhard Langer	72-71-71-69=283	−5	7,737
T24	(Zimbabwe) Nick Price	71-68-68-76=283	−5	7,737
T24	(United States) Hal Sutton (c)	68-74-71-70=283	−5	7,737
T32	(United States) Curt Byrum	69-68-73-74=284	−4	5,414
T32	(United States) David Edwards	70-70-70-74=284	−4	5,414
T32	(United States) Bob Gilder	73-68-72-71=284	−4	5,414
T32	(United States) John Mahaffey (c)	70-72-69-73=284	−4	5,414
T32	(United States) Jack Renner	70-73-69-72=284	−4	5,414
T32	(United States) Dave Rummells	68-71-73-72=284	−4	5,414
T32	(United States) Gene Sauers	68-72-72-72=284	−4	5,414
T39	(United States) Scott Hoch	76-65-70-74=285	−3	4,400
T39	(United States) Clarence Rose	73-69-70-73=285	−3	4,400
T41	(South Africa) Bobby Cole	70-70-71-75=286	−2	3,900
T41	(United States) Mike Nicolette	73-69-70-74=286	−2	3,900
T41	(United States) Don Pooley	74-68-73-71=286	−2	3,900
T44	(United States) Chip Beck	71-71-76-69=287	−1	3,023
T44	(Taiwan) Chen Tze-chung	71-69-73-74=287	−1	3,023
T44	(United States) Lennie Clements	74-67-72-74=287	−1	3,023
T44	(United States) John Inman	73-70-72-72=287	−1	3,023
T44	(United States) Bob Murphy	73-70-69-75=287	−1	3,023
T44	(United States) Bill Rogers	69-73-69-76=287	−1	3,023
T50	(United States) Mark Calcavecchia	73-69-73-73=288	E	2,435
T50	(United States) Jay Haas	70-73-74-71=288	E	2,435
T50	(United States) Rocco Mediate	71-72-76-69=288	E	2,435
T50	(United States) Corey Pavin	75-68-70-75=288	E	2,435
T54	(United States) Andy Dillard	70-73-73-73=289	+1	2,270
T54	(United States) Bob Eastwood	67-73-74-75=289	+1	2,270
T54	(United States) Mark Hayes (c)	70-70-73-76=289	+1	2,270
T54	(United States) Barry Jaeckel	72-69-72-76=289	+1	2,270
T54	(United States) Andy North	70-69-76-74=289	+1	2,270
T54	(United States) Fuzzy Zoeller	75-67-73-74=289	+1	2,270
60	(United States) Russ Cochran	72-70-76-72=290	+2	2,200
T61	(Scotland) Ken Brown	71-71-69-80=291	+3	2,170
T61	(United States) Dan Forsman	71-69-74-77=291	+3	2,170
T63	(United States) Mark Brooks	68-75-73-76=292	+4	2,130
T63	(United States) Joey Sindelar	72-71-71-78=292	+4	2,130
T65	(Spain) Seve Ballesteros	70-69-77-77=293	+5	2,080
T65	(United States) George Burns	69-73-84-67=293	+5	2,080
T65	(United States) Larry Rinker	75-68-78-72=293	+5	2,080
68	(Australia) Rodger Davis	73-70-76-76=295	+7	2,040
69	(United States) Blaine McCallister	68-73-80-75=296	+8	2,020
70	(United States) Dave Stockton	68-70-79-80=297	+9	2,000
71	(United States) Bob Lohr	72-71-73-82=298	+10	1,980
72	(United States) Sam Randolph	71-71-82-78=302	+14	1,960
CUT	(United States) John Adams	72-72=144	E	
CUT	(United States) Tom Byrum	76-68=144	E	
CUT	(United States) Bobby Clampett	74-70=144	E	
CUT	(United States) John Cook	72-72=144	E	
CUT	(United States) Fred Couples (c)	72-72=144	E	
CUT	(Australia) Steve Elkington	74-70=144	E	
CUT	(United States) Jim Gallagher Jr.	71-73=144	E	
CUT	(United States) Lon Hinkle	71-73=144	E	
CUT	(United States) Kenny Knox	73-71=144	E	
CUT	(United States) Andrew Magee	71-73=144	E	
CUT	(United States) Roger Maltbie	73-71=144	E	
CUT	(United States) Larry Nelson	73-71=144	E	
CUT	(United States) Jack Nicklaus (c)	70-74=144	E	
CUT	(United States) Steve Pate	71-73=144	E	
CUT	(United States) J. C. Snead	71-73=144	E	
CUT	(United States) Leonard Thompson	74-70=144	E	
CUT	(United States) Bob Tway	71-73=144	E	
CUT	(United States) Bobby Wadkins	72-72=144	E	
CUT	(United States) D. A. Weibring	72-72=144	E	
CUT	(Canada) Richard Zokol	74-70=144	E	
CUT	(United States) Phil Blackmar	71-74=145	+1	
CUT	(United States) Charlie Bolling	69-76=145	+1	
CUT	(United States) Ed Fiori	75-70=145	+1	
CUT	(United States) Gary Hallberg	77-68=145	+1	
CUT	(United States) Johnny Miller	73-72=145	+1	
CUT	(United States) Calvin Peete (c)	71-74=145	+1	
CUT	(United States) Mark Pfeil	73-72=145	+1	
CUT	(United States) Tim Simpson	73-72=145	+1	
CUT	(United States) Payne Stewart	77-68=145	+1	
CUT	(United States) Doug Tewell	74-71=145	+1	
CUT	(United States) Lanny Wadkins (c)	70-75=145	+1	
CUT	(United States) Tom Watson	73-72=145	+1	
CUT	(Mexico) Antonio Cerda Jr.	75-71=146	+2	
CUT	(United States) Danny Edwards	70-76=146	+2	
CUT	(United States) Donnie Hammond	70-76=146	+2	
CUT	(United States) Wayne Levi	68-78=146	+2	
CUT	(United States) Pat McGowan	74-72=146	+2	
CUT	(United States) Craig Stadler	74-72=146	+2	
CUT	(United States) Jim Thorpe	76-70=146	+2	
CUT	(United States) Fred Wadsworth	69-77=146	+2	
CUT	(Canada) Dave Barr	73-74=147	+3	
CUT	(United States) Ronnie Black	72-75=147	+3	
CUT	(United States) Mike Donald	78-69=147	+3	
CUT	(United States) Brad Faxon	76-71=147	+3	
CUT	(United States) Rick Fehr	73-74=147	+3	
CUT	(United States) Bruce Lietzke	71-76=147	+3	
CUT	(United States) Davis Love III	73-74=147	+3	
CUT	(United States) Mark Lye	73-74=147	+3	
CUT	(United States) Dick Mast	74-73=147	+3	
CUT	(Zimbabwe) Denis Watson	73-74=147	+3	
CUT	(United States) Jay Don Blake	78-70=148	+4	
CUT	(United States) Brian Claar	81-67=148	+4	
CUT	(United States) Rick Dalpos	73-75=148	+4	
CUT	(United States) Bill Sander	74-74=148	+4	
CUT	(United States) Brett Upper	71-77=148	+4	
CUT	(United States) Jay Delsing	73-76=149	+5	
CUT	(United States) Ernie Gonzalez	76-73=149	+5	
CUT	(Canada) Dan Halldorson	76-73=149	+5	
CUT	(United States) Raymond Floyd (c)	74-76=150	+6	
CUT	(United States) Gary Koch	75-75=150	+6	
CUT	(United States) Curtis Strange	75-75=150	+6	
CUT	(United States) Howard Twitty	76-74=150	+6	
CUT	(United States) Lee Trevino (c)	70-81=151	+7	
CUT	(United States) George Archer	77-75=152	+8	
CUT	(United States) Peter Jacobsen	75-77=152	+8	
CUT	(United States) David Ogrin	73-79=152	+8	
CUT	(United States) Andy Bean	73-80=153	+9	
CUT	(Australia) David Graham	76-77=153	+9	
CUT	(United States) Tom Sieckmann	81-72=153	+9	
CUT	(United States) Willie Wood	80-78=158	+14	
WD	(United States) Jodie Mudd	70	−2	
WD	(United States) Jim Colbert	75	+3	

==== Playoff ====
Place	Player	Score	To par	Money ($)
1	(Scotland) Sandy Lyle	5-3-4=12	E	180,000
2	(United States) Jeff Sluman	5-3-5=13	+1	108,000

- The sudden-death playoff began on hole 16, went to 17, and ended at 18.

===== Scorecard =====
Hole	16	17	18
Par	5	3	4
(Scotland) Lyle	E	E	E
(United States) Sluman	E	E	+1
