= 1985 Tournament Players Championship =

Tournament information
- Dates: March 28–31, 1985
- Location: Ponte Vedra Beach, Florida; 30.198°N 81.394°W
- Courses: TPC Sawgrass, Stadium Course
- Tour: PGA Tour

Statistics
- Par: 72
- Length: 6,857 yards (6,270 m)
- Field: 144 players, 75 after cut
- Cut: 146 (+2)
- Prize fund: $900,000
- Winner's share: $162,000

Champion
- (United States) Calvin Peete
- 274 (−14)

Location map
- Location in the United States Location in Florida

The 1985 Tournament Players Championship was a golf tournament in Florida on the PGA Tour, held March 28–31 at TPC Sawgrass in Ponte Vedra Beach, southeast of Jacksonville. It was the twelfth Tournament Players Championship.

Calvin Peete shot 66 in the final round for 274 (−14) and the win, three strokes ahead of runner-up D. A. Weibring. Peete was the only player to break par in all four rounds.

Defending champion Fred Couples finished nineteen strokes back, in a tie for 49th place.

== Venue ==
This was the fourth Tournament Players Championship held at the TPC at Sawgrass Stadium Course and it remained at 6,857 yards (6,270 m).

== Field ==
1. Top 125 players, if PGA Tour members, from Final 1984 Official Money List:

Tom Watson, Mark O'Meara, Andy Bean, Denis Watson, Tom Kite, Bruce Lietzke, Fred Couples, Craig Stadler, Greg Norman, Peter Jacobsen, Payne Stewart, Lee Trevino, Gil Morgan, Curtis Strange, Jack Nicklaus, Ben Crenshaw, Gary Koch, Corey Pavin, Jack Renner, Wayne Levi, John Mahaffey, Scott Simpson, David Edwards, Bob Eastwood, Calvin Peete, Hal Sutton, Scott Hoch, George Archer, Lanny Wadkins, Gary Hallberg, Hale Irwin, Dan Pohl, Hubert Green, Chip Beck, Ronnie Black, Larry Mize, George Burns, Nick Faldo, Tom Purtzer, Fuzzy Zoeller, Tim Simpson, Larry Nelson, Billy Kratzert, Jay Haas, Mike Donald, Johnny Miller, Jim Thorpe, Mike Reid, Mark McCumber, Russ Cochran, Seve Ballesteros, Rex Caldwell, Don Pooley, Buddy Gardner, Roger Maltbie, Doug Tewell, David Graham, Joey Sindelar, Larry Rinker, Willie Wood, Dave Barr, Mike Sullivan, Jim Colbert, D. A. Weibring, Nick Price, Bobby Wadkins, Raymond Floyd, Mark Pfeil, Vance Heafner, Tony Sills, Lon Hinkle, Jim Simons, Bernhard Langer, Jim Nelford, Tommy Nakajima, Keith Fergus, Peter Oosterhuis, John Adams, Ron Streck, Brad Faxon, Ralph Landrum, Isao Aoki, Gibby Gilbert, Gary McCord, Donnie Hammond, Loren Roberts, J. C. Snead, John Cook, Sammy Rachels, Clarence Rose, Mike Nicolette, Tim Norris, Allen Miller, Pat Lindsey, Richard Zokol, Frank Conner, Dan Halldorson, TC Chen, Joe Inman, Danny Edwards, Tom Jenkins, Pat McGowan, Dan Forsman, Howard Twitty, Morris Hatalsky, Phil Hancock, Jim Dent, Barry Jaeckel, Victor Regalado, Ken Brown, David Ogrin, Jodie Mudd, Mark Hayes, Mike Smith, Bobby Clampett, Jerry Pate, Ed Fiori, Mac O'Grady, John Fought, Mark Brooks, Lance Ten Broeck, Tommy Valentine, Brett Upper

Mark Lye and Gary Player did not play

2. Designated players

Bill Rogers

3. Any foreign player meeting the requirements of a designated player, whether or not he is a PGA Tour member

4. Winners in the last 10 calendar years of The Players Championship, PGA Championship, U.S. Open, Masters Tournament, and World Series of Golf (beginning In 1976)

Andy North, Dave Stockton

5. The leader in Senior PGA Tour official earnings of 1984

Don January (did not to play)

6. The three players, not otherwise eligible, designated by the TPC Committee as "special selections"

Arnold Palmer, Lou Graham

7. To complete a field of 144 players, those players in order, not otherwise eligible, from the 1985 Official Money List, as of the completion of the USF&G Classic, March 17, 1985

Woody Blackburn, Bill Glasson, Brad Fabel, Paul Azinger, Sandy Lyle, Andrew Magee, Jay Delsing, Mike Bright, Bob Lohr, Chris Perry, Phil Blackmar, Wayne Grady, Greg Twiggs, Gene Sauers, David Lundstrom

General source:

== Round summaries ==
=== First round ===
Thursday, March 28, 1985

Place	Player	Score	To par
1	(United States) Hale Irwin	67	−5
T2	(United States) Morris Hatalsky	68	−4
T2	(West Germany) Bernhard Langer	68	−4
T2	(United States) Larry Rinker	68	−4
T2	(United States) D. A. Weibring	68	−4
T6	(United States) Ronnie Black	69	−3
T6	(United States) Mark Brooks	69	−3
T6	(United States) Bobby Wadkins	69	−3
T9	(Japan) Isao Aoki	70	−2
T9	(United States) John Cook	70	−2
T9	(Canada) Dan Halldorson	70	−2
T9	(United States) Tom Kite	70	−2
T9	(United States) Pat McGowan	70	−2
T9	(United States) Mark O'Meara	70	−2
T9	(United States) Calvin Peete	70	−2
T9	(United States) Curtis Strange	70	−2

=== Second round ===
Friday, March 29, 1985

Place	Player	Score	To par
1	(United States) D. A. Weibring	68-68=136	−8
T2	(Canada) Dan Halldorson	70-68=138	−6
T2	(West Germany) Bernhard Langer	68-70=138	−6
T4	(United States) Hale Irwin	67-72=139	−5
T4	(United States) Calvin Peete	70-69=139	−5
6	(United States) Larry Rinker	68-72=140	−4
T7	(United States) Jodie Mudd	71-70=141	−3
T7	(United States) Jack Nicklaus	71-70=141	−3
T9	(United States) Mike Donald	71-71=142	−2
T9	(Australia) Greg Norman	71-71=142	−2
T9	(Zimbabwe) Nick Price	73-69=142	−2
T9	(United States) J. C. Snead	71-71=142	−2
T9	(United States) Mike Sullivan	73-69=142	−2
T9	(United States) Doug Tewell	75-67=142	−2
T9	(United States) Brett Upper	72-70=142	−2
T9	(Zimbabwe) Denis Watson	73-69=142	−2

=== Third round ===
Saturday, March 30, 1985

Place	Player	Score	To par
T1	(United States) Hale Irwin	67-72-69=208	−8
T1	(United States) Calvin Peete	70-69-69=208	−8
T1	(United States) D. A. Weibring	68-68-72=208	−8
T4	(United States) Gary Hallberg	72-71-67=210	−6
T4	(Canada) Dan Halldorson	70-68-72=210	−6
6	(United States) Larry Rinker	68-72-71=211	−5
T7	(United States) Dan Forsman	74-69-69=212	−4
T7	(United States) Jack Nicklaus	71-70-71=212	−4
T7	(United States) Payne Stewart	73-70-69=212	−4
T7	(United States) Greg Twiggs	73-72-67=212	−4

=== Final round ===
Sunday, March 31, 1985

Champion
(c) = past champion

Place	Player	Score	To par	Money ($)
1	(United States) Calvin Peete	70-69-69-66=274	−14	162,000
2	(United States) D. A. Weibring	68-68-72-69=277	−11	97,200
3	(United States) Larry Rinker	68-72-71-70=281	−7	61,200
4	(United States) Gary Hallberg	72-71-67-72=282	−6	43,200
T5	(Canada) Dan Halldorson	70-68-72-73=283	−5	34,200
T5	(United States) Hale Irwin	67-72-69-75=283	−5	34,200
T7	(Japan) Isao Aoki	70-75-74-65=284	−4	27,112
T7	(United States) Lon Hinkle	71-72-71-70=284	−4	27,112
T7	(West Germany) Bernhard Langer	68-70-75-71=284	−4	27,112
T7	(United States) Bruce Lietzke	71-72-70-71=284	−4	27,112

Leaderboard below the top 10
Place	Player	Score	To par	Money ($)
11	(United States) Doug Tewell	75-67-72-71=285	−3	22,500
12	(United States) Pat McGowan	70-74-70-72=286	−2	20,700
T13	(United States) Dan Forsman	74-69-69-75=287	−1	16,875
T13	(United States) Bill Rogers	73-72-71-71=287	−1	16,875
T13	(United States) Craig Stadler	73-70-75-69=287	−1	16,875
T13	(United States) Payne Stewart	73-70-69-75=287	−1	16,875
T17	(United States) Jim Dent	71-74-74-69=288	E	12,600
T17	(United States) Jack Nicklaus (c)	71-70-71-76=288	E	12,600
T17	(United States) Mark O'Meara	70-75-72-71=288	E	12,600
T17	(United States) Don Pooley	72-72-71-73=288	E	12,600
T17	(United States) J. C. Snead	71-71-74-72=288	E	12,600
T22	(Canada) Dave Barr	75-70-71-73=289	+1	8,640
T22	(Scotland) Ken Brown	75-70-73-71=289	+1	8,640
T22	(Zimbabwe) Nick Price	73-69-72-75=289	+1	8,640
T22	(United States) Hal Sutton (c)	76-69-70-74=289	+1	8,640
T22	(United States) Brett Upper	72-70-73-74=289	+1	8,640
T27	(United States) Ed Fiori	72-72-73-73=290	+2	6,255
T27	(United States) Roger Maltbie	74-71-70-75=290	+2	6,255
T27	(United States) Clarence Rose	75-68-72-75=290	+2	6,255
T27	(United States) Joey Sindelar	73-70-71-76=290	+2	6,255
T27	(United States) Howard Twitty	74-71-73-72=290	+2	6,255
T27	(United States) Fuzzy Zoeller	72-74-72-72=290	+2	6,255
T33	(United States) Jim Colbert	71-73-74-73=291	+3	4,654
T33	(United States) Ben Crenshaw	72-71-73-75=291	+3	4,654
T33	(United States) Raymond Floyd (c)	75-71-71-74=291	+3	4,654
T33	(United States) Bob Gilder	72-74-71-74=291	+3	4,654
T33	(Australia) David Graham	73-71-76-71=291	+3	4,654
T33	(United States) Scott Simpson	73-73-70-75=291	+3	4,654
T33	(United States) Curtis Strange	70-73-72-76=291	+3	4,654
T40	(United States) Ronnie Black	69-75-71-77=292	+4	3,154
T40	(United States) Mike Bright	72-73-75-72=292	+4	3,154
T40	(United States) Keith Fergus	72-72-75-73=292	+4	3,154
T40	(United States) Allen Miller	71-74-74-73=292	+4	3,154
T40	(United States) Jodie Mudd	71-70-75-76=292	+4	3,154
T40	(United States) Mike Nicolette	77-69-75-71=292	+4	3,154
T40	(United States) Mark Pfeil	73-72-71-76=292	+4	3,154
T40	(United States) Tom Purtzer	74-69-72-77=292	+4	3,154
T40	(United States) Mike Reid	72-74-71-75=292	+4	3,154
T49	(United States) George Archer	72-74-75-72=293	+5	2,199
T49	(United States) Fred Couples (c)	73-72-74-74=293	+5	2,199
T49	(United States) Mike Donald	71-71-77-74=293	+5	2,199
T49	(Australia) Greg Norman	71-71-74-77=293	+5	2,199
T49	(United States) Greg Twiggs	73-72-67-81=293	+5	2,199
T49	(Canada) Richard Zokol	71-75-70-77=293	+5	2,199
T55	(United States) Gibby Gilbert	75-70-73-76=294	+6	2,007
T55	(United States) Jay Haas	73-72-75-74=294	+6	2,007
T55	(United States) Gary Koch	74-72-76-72=294	+6	2,007
T55	(United States) Andy North	72-72-75-75=294	+6	2,007
T55	(United States) Chris Perry	72-71-70-81=294	+6	2,007
T55	(United States) Jack Renner	75-71-72-76=294	+6	2,007
T55	(United States) Lee Trevino (c)	73-73-70-78=294	+6	2,007
T55	(United States) Tom Watson	71-74-72-77=294	+6	2,007
63	(United States) Barry Jaeckel	71-73-73-78=295	+7	1,926
T64	(United States) Phil Blackmar	73-73-79-71=296	+8	1,872
T64	(United States) Tom Kite	70-75-75-76=296	+8	1,872
T64	(England) Peter Oosterhuis	71-75-75-75=296	+8	1,872
T64	(United States) Jerry Pate (c)	75-70-74-77=296	+8	1,872
T64	(United States) Bobby Wadkins	69-76-75-76=296	+8	1,872
T69	(United States) Danny Edwards	74-72-70-81=297	+9	1,791
T69	(United States) Ralph Landrum	73-73-70-81=297	+9	1,791
T69	(United States) Arnold Palmer	74-72-75-76=297	+9	1,791
T69	(Zimbabwe) Denis Watson	73-69-76-79=297	+9	1,791
73	(United States) Bobby Clampett	74-70-76-78=298	+10	1,746
74	(United States) Dan Pohl	71-73-74-81=299	+11	1,728
CUT	(United States) Paul Azinger	74-73=147	+3	
CUT	(United States) Andy Bean	74-73=147	+3	
CUT	(United States) Mark Brooks	69-78=147	+3	
CUT	(Taiwan) Chen Tze-chung	73-74=147	+3	
CUT	(United States) Frank Conner	73-74=147	+3	
CUT	(United States) John Cook	70-77=147	+3	
CUT	(United States) Brad Faxon	74-73=147	+3	
CUT	(United States) John Fought	75-72=147	+3	
CUT	(United States) Buddy Gardner	72-75=147	+3	
CUT	(United States) Morris Hatalsky	68-79=147	+3	
CUT	(United States) Pat Lindsey	72-75=147	+3	
CUT	(United States) Willie Wood	78-69=147	+3	
CUT	(United States) Bob Eastwood	79-69=148	+4	
CUT	(Australia) Wayne Grady	75-73=148	+4	
CUT	(United States) Hubert Green	72-76=148	+4	
CUT	(United States) Andrew Magee	79-69=148	+4	
CUT	(United States) John Mahaffey	76-72=148	+4	
CUT	(United States) Mark McCumber	76-72=148	+4	
CUT	(United States) Gil Morgan	71-77=148	+4	
CUT	(United States) Tim Simpson	72-76=148	+4	
CUT	(United States) David Edwards	73-76=149	+5	
CUT	(England) Nick Faldo	79-70=149	+5	
CUT	(United States) Mark Hayes (c)	77-72=149	+5	
CUT	(Scotland) Sandy Lyle	74-75=149	+5	
CUT	(United States) Loren Roberts	74-75=149	+5	
CUT	(United States) Lance Ten Broeck	75-74=149	+5	
CUT	(Spain) Seve Ballesteros	76-74=150	+6	
CUT	(United States) George Burns	74-76=150	+6	
CUT	(United States) Russ Cochran	76-74=150	+6	
CUT	(United States) Scott Hoch	76-74=150	+6	
CUT	(United States) Peter Jacobsen	75-75=150	+6	
CUT	(United States) Larry Mize	71-79=150	+6	
CUT	(United States) Corey Pavin	73-77=150	+6	
CUT	(Mexico) Victor Regalado	74-76=150	+6	
CUT	(United States) Gene Sauers	76-74=150	+6	
CUT	(United States) Jim Thorpe	74-76=150	+6	
CUT	(United States) Woody Blackburn	78-73=151	+7	
CUT	(United States) Bill Glasson	73-78=151	+7	
CUT	(Canada) Jim Nelford	76-75=151	+7	
CUT	(United States) Tim Norris	76-75=151	+7	
CUT	(United States) Brad Fabel	75-77=152	+8	
CUT	(United States) Joe Inman	77-75=152	+8	
CUT	(United States) Wayne Levi	72-80=152	+8	
CUT	(United States) David Lundstrom	74-78=152	+8	
CUT	(United States) Johnny Miller	73-79=152	+8	
CUT	(United States) Larry Nelson	76-76=152	+8	
CUT	(United States) David Ogrin	79-73=152	+8	
CUT	(United States) Jim Simons	77-75=152	+8	
CUT	(United States) Tommy Valentine	78-74=152	+8	
CUT	(United States) John Adams	72-81=153	+9	
CUT	(United States) Phil Hancock	83-70=153	+9	
CUT	(United States) Tony Sills	77-76=153	+9	
CUT	(United States) Tom Jenkins	77-77=154	+10	
CUT	(United States) Billy Kratzert	77-77=154	+10	
CUT	(United States) Dave Stockton	77-77=154	+10	
CUT	(United States) Ron Streck	74-80=154	+10	
CUT	(United States) Lanny Wadkins (c)	80-74=154	+10	
CUT	(United States) Chip Beck	81-74=155	+11	
CUT	(United States) Jay Delsing	79-76=155	+11	
CUT	(United States) Donnie Hammond	83-72=155	+11	
CUT	(United States) Sammy Rachels	77-78=155	+11	
CUT	(United States) Rex Caldwell	76-80=156	+12	
CUT	(Japan) Tsuneyuki Nakajima	73-86=159	+15	
CUT	(United States) Lou Graham	80-80=160	+16	
CUT	(United States) Bob Lohr	81-83=164	+20	
CUT	(United States) Gary McCord	86-78=164	+20	
WD	(United States) Mike Sullivan	73-69-75=217	+1	
WD	(United States) Mac O'Grady	77	+5	
WD	(United States) Vance Heafner	78	+6	
WD	(United States) Mike Smith	84	+12	
