= Jerry Ford Invitational =

Celebrity golf tournament

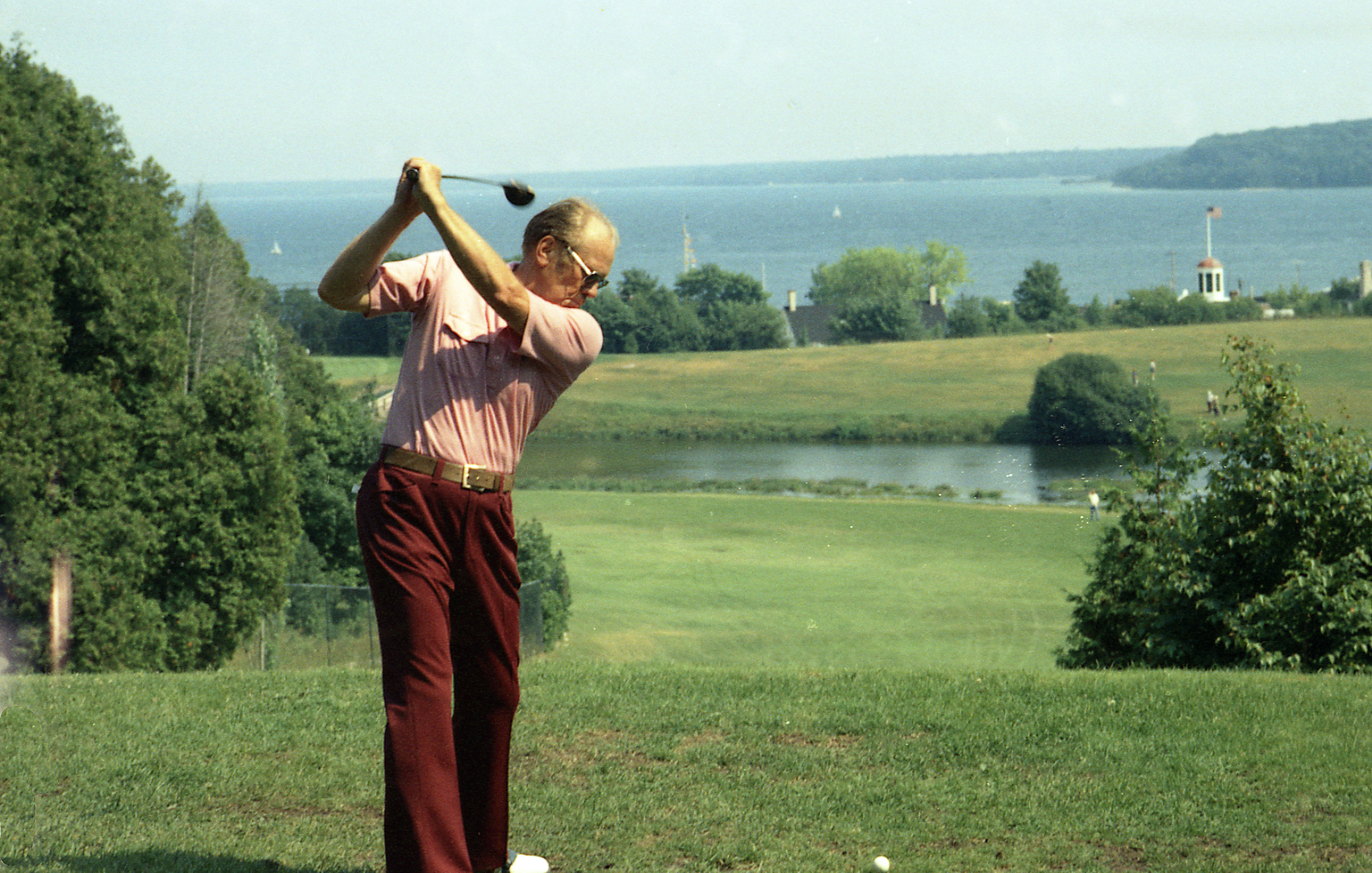
President Ford playing golf

The Jerry Ford Invitational was a celebrity pro-am golf tournament hosted by former President Gerald Ford. It was played in Vail, Colorado from 1977 to 1996. In years that there was a tied for first place, no playoff was held.

== Winners ==
Year	Winner(s)	Runner(s)-up	Ref
1977	Jack Nicklaus	Pat Bradley, Pat Rea	
1978	Dale Douglass, Ed Sneed (tied)	(title shared)	
1979	Bob Murphy	Tom Kite	
1980	Hubert Green, J. C. Snead (tied)	(title shared)	
1981	Tom Purtzer	Curtis Strange, Craig Stadler, John Cook	
1982	Tom Weiskopf	Fuzzy Zoeller, Tom Purtzer	
1983	Gil Morgan, Don Pooley (tied)	(title shared)	
1984	Ed Fiori	Don Pooley, Barry Jaeckel	
1985	Mark Pfeil	Jim Colbert	
1986	Craig Stadler	Mark O'Meara	
1987	Jim Colbert	Mark Wiebe, Jim Thorpe, Clarence Rose	
1988	Gary Hallberg	J. C. Snead, Jay Delsing	
1989	Donnie Hammond, Ted Schulz (tied)	(title shared)	
1990	Donnie Hammond, Jim Gallagher Jr., Andy North (tied)	(title shared)	
1991	Andrew Magee	Bob Lohr	
1992	Andrew Magee	Ted Schulz	
1993	Jay Delsing, Donnie Hammond, Jim Thorpe (tied)	(title shared)	
1994	Jay Don Blake	Lon Hinkle, Jerry Pate, Bob Lohr, Ed Fiori, Kirk Triplett	
1995	Doug Tewell	Bob Lohr	
1996	Dillard Pruitt	Keith Fergus, Jay Don Blake	
