= Spring 1975 PGA Tour Qualifying School graduates =

This is a list of the Spring 1975 PGA Tour Qualifying School graduates.

== Tournament summary ==
The tournament was played at Bay Tree Golf Plantation in North Myrtle Beach, South Carolina in early June and had a field of 233 players. It was reduced from 144 holes to 108 holes and there were no regional qualifiers. A total of 13 players earned their tour card.

Billy Kratzert attempted to qualify at PGA Tour Qualifying Tournament for the second time. He was unsuccessful at 1974 PGA Tour Qualifying School and was unsuccessful again. In his third attempt, Calvin Peete made it onto the PGA Tour.

== List of graduates ==
#	Player	Notes
1	(United States) Joey Dills	
T2	(United States) Tom Purtzer	
T2	(United States) Howard Twitty	Winner of 1970 Porter Cup
T4	(United States) Barry Jaeckel	Winner of 1972 French Open
T4	(United States) Pat McDonald	
T6	(United States) Dan Elliott	
T6	(United States) David Lind	
8	(United States) Calvin Peete	
T9	(United States) Bruce Lietzke	
T9	(United States) Dan O'Neill	
T9	(United States) Sammy Rachels	
T12	(Mexico) Antonio Cerda Jr.	
T12	(United States) Randy Feather	
