= Sun Country PGA Championship =

American golf championship

The Sun Country PGA Championship is a golf championship for the Sun Country section of the PGA of America. This section was founded in 1974 by Guy Wimberly, and encompasses New Mexico and western Texas. The Sun Country tournament started in 1961, when it was a chapter of the Southwest section.

Don Klein of Four Hills Country Club in Albuquerque, New Mexico was the first to win the tournament. Klein still holds the record for most victories, having won six consecutive championships between 1961-1966 and another in 1968. Former PGA Tour professional, Tim Norris, winner of the 1982 Sammy Davis Jr.-Greater Hartford Open, won the 1992 championship.

The Sun Country Section PGA was established in 1974 as one of the 41 sections that make up the Professional Golfers Association. The Section (consisting of the state of New Mexico and El Paso County, Texas) currently has 136 PGA members and 55 PGA apprentices.

== Winners ==
- 1961 Don Klein
- 1962 Don Klein
- 1963 Don Klein
- 1964 Don Klein
- 1965 Don Klein
- 1966 Don Klein
- 1967 Iverson Martin
- 1968 Don Klein
- 1969 Bill Eschenbrenner
- 1970 Gene Torres
- 1971 Gene Torres
- 1972 Bob Meiering
- 1973 Don McDaniel
- 1974 Gene Torres
- 1975 Darrell Hickock
- 1976 Robert Atkins
- 1977 Woody Dame
- 1978 Gene Torres
- 1979 Woody Dame
- 1980 Bill Peterson
- 1981 Jim Dickson
- 1982 Gene Torres
- 1983 Gene Torres
- 1984 Mark Pelletier
- 1985 Jim Dickson
- 1986 Terry Jennings
- 1987 Jim Dickson
- 1988 Jim Dickson
- 1989 Ray Cragun
- 1990 Dan Koesters
- 1991 Mike Putnam
- 1992 Tim Norris
- 1993 Ray Cragun
- 1994 Ray Cragun
- 1995 Jim Dickson
- 1996 Mike Putnam
- 1997 Cameron Doan
- 1998 Cameron Doan
- 1999 Cameron Doan
- 2000 Dan Koesters
- 2001 Dan Koesters
- 2002 Bill Hancock
- 2003 Bill Harvey
- 2004 Kurt Osborn
- 2005 Scott Gates
- 2006 Bill Harvey
- 2007 Bill Harvey
- 2008 Mark Pelletier
- 2009 Scott Gates
- 2010 Scott Lieberwirth
- 2011 Trent Romman
- 2012 David Muttitt
- 2013 David Muttitt
- 2014 Scott Gates
- 2015 David Muttitt
- 2016 Brad Lardon
- 2017 Jeff Roth
- 2018 David Muttitt
- 2019 David Muttitt
- 2020 Jordan Gibbs
- 2021 Jordan Gibbs
- 2022 Brad Lardon
- 2023 Brad Lardon
- 2024 Bill Harvey
- 2025 Devin Miertschin
- 2026 Wil Collins
