= 1984 PGA Tour Qualifying School graduates =

This is a list of the 1984 PGA Tour Qualifying School graduates. 50 players earned their 1985 PGA Tour card through Q-School in 1984.

== Tournament summary ==
The tournament was played over 108 holes at the La Quinta Hotel Golf Club, Dunes course, in La Quinta, California. The top 50 players split the $100,000 purse, with the winner earning $15,000. There was a six-man playoff among those that tied for 47th to determine the final four spots – Jim Hallet and Keith Parker were eliminated.

== List of graduates ==
| Place | Player | Notes |
|---|---|---|
| 1 | (United States) Paul Azinger | |
| T2 | (United States) Phil Blackmar | |
| T2 | (United States) Tom Sieckmann | 3 Asia Golf Circuit wins |
| 4 | (United States) Mark Wiebe | |
| 5 | (United States) Skeeter Heath | |
| 6 | (Australia) Wayne Grady | 1 PGA Tour of Australia win, 1 European Tour win |
| 7 | (United States) Steve Pate | |
| T8 | (United States) Bill Bergin | |
| T8 | (United States) Brad Fabel | |
| T8 | (United States) Mick Soli | |
| T8 | (United States) Dennis Trixler | |
| T8 | (United States) Robert Wrenn | 1 Asia Golf Circuit win |
| T13 | (United States) Mike Bright | |
| T13 | (United States) Ken Green | |
| T13 | (United States) Chris Perry | |
| T16 | (South Africa) David Frost | 1 European Tour win, 1 Sunshine Tour win |
| T16 | (United States) Jeff Hart | |
| T16 | (United States) Mike Hulbert | |
| T16 | (United States) Tom Lehman | |
| T16 | (United States) Andrew Magee | |
| T16 | (United States) Greg Twiggs | |
| 22 | (United States) Ernie Gonzalez | |
| 23 | (United States) Jeff Sluman | |
| T24 | (United States) Ron Commans | |
| T24 | (United States) Jay Delsing | |
| T24 | (United States) Gordon Johnson | |
| T24 | (United States) Steve Jones | |
| T24 | (United States) Kenny Knox | |
| T24 | (United States) Jeff Sanders | |
| T24 | (United States) Bob Tway | |
| T31 | (United States) Mike Barnblatt | |
| T31 | (United States) Woody Blackburn | |
| T31 | (United States) Steven Bowman | |
| T31 | (United States) Bill Britton | |
| T31 | (United States) Jeff Coston | |
| T31 | (United States) Ivan Smith | |
| T31 | (United States) Terry Snodgrass | |
| T31 | (United States) David Thore | |
| T31 | (United States) Tom Woodward | |
| T40 | (United States) Bill Buttner | |
| T40 | (United States) Lennie Clements | Winner of 1982 Timex Open |
| T40 | (United States) John DeForest | |
| T40 | (United States) Gary Pinns | |
| T40 | (United States) Steven Liebler | |
| T40 | (United States) Bob Lohr | |
| T40 | (United States) Stuart Smith | |
| T47 | (United States) Dave Davis | |
| T47 | (United States) Bill Glasson | |
| T47 | (United States) Mike Gove | |
| T47 | (United States) David Lundstrom | |
