= Ken Green (golfer) =

American professional golfer (born 1958)

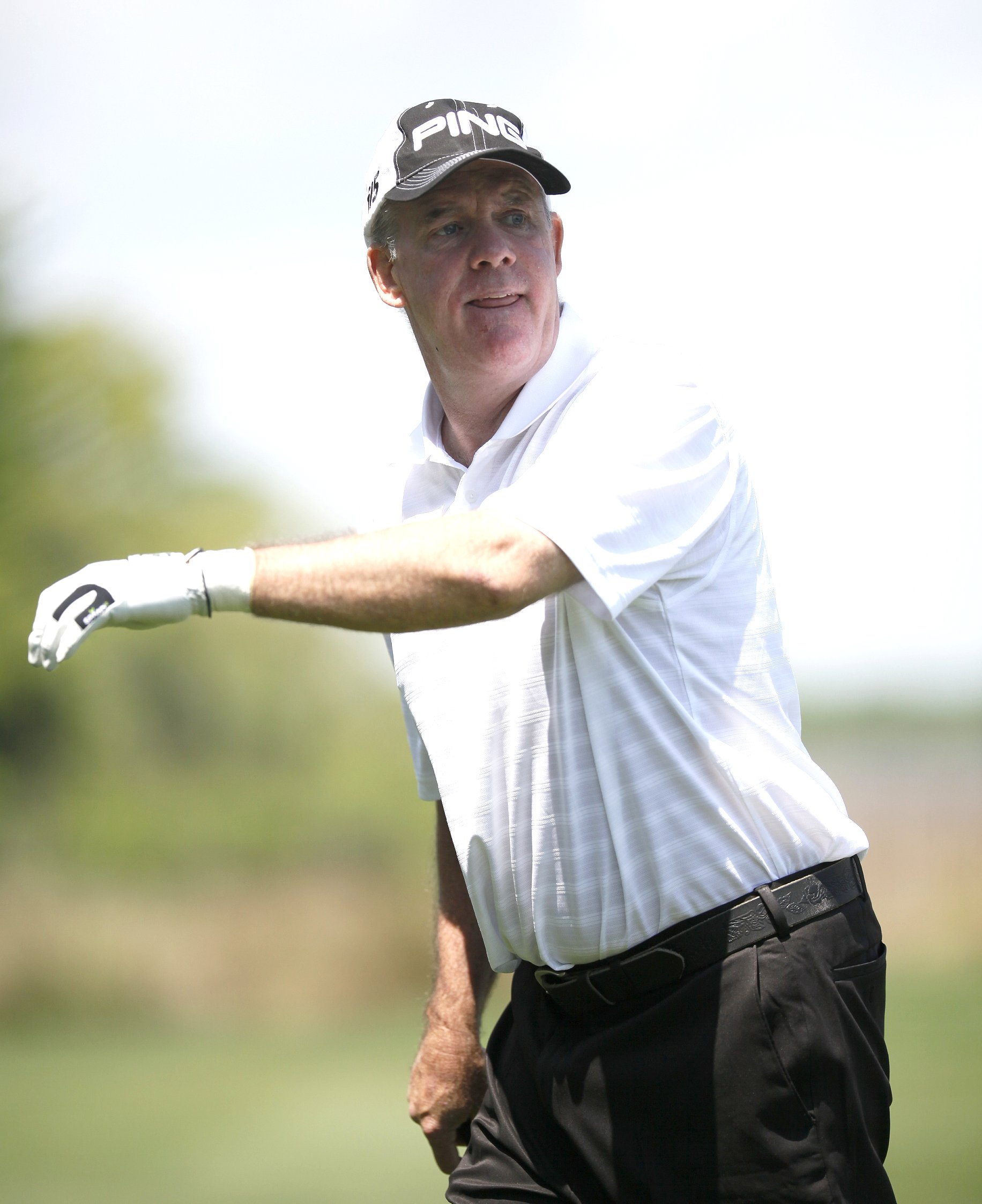
- Green in 2010

Personal information
- Full name: Kenneth J. Green
- Nationality: United States
- Born: July 23, 1958 (age 68) Danbury, Connecticut, U.S.
- Height: 5 ft 10 in (1.78 m)
- Weight: 195 lb (88 kg; 13.9 st)

Career
- Sport: Golf
- College: Palm Beach Junior College; University of Florida
- Turned professional: 1979
- Current tour: PGA Tour Champions
- Former tour: PGA Tour
- Professional wins: 11
- Highest ranking: 15 (February 12, 1989)

Number of wins by tour
- PGA Tour: 5
- Japan Golf Tour: 1
- Other: 5

Best results in major championships
- Masters Tournament: T11: 1989
- PGA Championship: T16: 1991
- U.S. Open: T7: 1996
- The Open Championship: T29: 1987

Achievements and awards
- Champions Tour Comeback Player of the Year: 2010

Kenneth J. Green (born July 23, 1958) is an American professional golfer who has played on the PGA Tour, the Nationwide Tour and the PGA Tour Champions. Green has won eleven tournaments as a pro, including five PGA Tour events and played on the U.S. team in the 1989 Ryder Cup. He is also known for returning to competition after losing his right leg in a 2009 RV accident.

== Early life ==
Green was born in Danbury, Connecticut. He started playing golf at age 12 in Honduras, where his father, Martin "Marty" Green, was principal of the American school, and his only choices of sports were golf or soccer. He quit school at 16 to pursue his dream of becoming a professional tour player. He received his GED in December 1976.

== Amateur career ==
Green later attended Palm Beach Junior College in Lake Worth, Florida for a year. He then accepted an athletic scholarship to attend the University of Florida in Gainesville, Florida, where he played for coach Buster Bishop and coach John Darr's Florida Gators men's golf team in National Collegiate Athletic Association (NCAA) competition from 1977 to 1979. Green was a second-team All-Southeastern Conference (SEC) selection in 1979.

== Professional career ==
Green turned pro in 1979 and joined the PGA Tour in 1980. He had five tournament victories on the PGA Tour; all five came in the mid to late 1980s. His first win came in 1985 at the Buick Open, and his last was at the Kmart Greater Greensboro Open in 1989. His best year in professional golf was 1988, when he won two events on the PGA Tour, as well as the Dunlop Phoenix in Japan. His best finish in a major was a seventh-place tie at the 1996 U.S. Open. Green also played on the U.S. team in the 1989 Ryder Cup.

During his time in professional golf, Green has had a reputation for rebelliousness and a propensity to pull stunts. He has had over two dozen fines levied by the PGA Tour for his bad boy antics. Some of his antics included sneaking friends into The Masters in the trunk of his car, drinking beer on the course while playing with Arnold Palmer at the 1997 Masters, and hitting golf balls through narrow openings in sliding-glass doors. Other fines were for more mundane offenses like swearing on the course, criticizing officials, and signing autographs while playing. His personal problems—divorces, gambling, clinical depression—led to near financial ruin, and affected his playing time and the quality of his play. In his 40s, Green had difficulty maintaining his PGA Tour playing privileges and was forced to play some on the Nationwide Tour.

He has sometimes played tournament rounds dressed in green from head to toe, shoes included.

Green had 508 career starts on the PGA Tour, the last coming in 2006. He continues to compete in a limited number of Champions Tour events. In 2022, he was one of the participants in the inaugural U.S. Adaptive Open, a tournament for those with various impairments, held at Pinehurst Resort's No. 6 Course.

== Personal life ==
Green lives in West Palm Beach, Florida. He is the father of two sons, Ken Jr. and Hunter. He is an avid bowler who once rolled a 300 game.

In 2003, Green was reported to have jumped into a canal in Palm Beach County, Florida to save his German Shepherd dog, Nip, from the jaws of an alligator.

In June 2009, Green was seriously injured in a motor vehicle accident when his motor home left the road. Green was in his recreational vehicle traveling on Interstate 20 near Meridian, Mississippi, when the right front tire blew, causing the vehicle to veer off the road and go down a deep embankment before hitting a tree. The accident killed the passengers: William Green, his brother; Jeanne Hodgin, his girlfriend; and his dog, Nip. Even though his lower right leg was amputated as a result of injuries suffered in the accident, Green vowed to return to competitive golf.

Green's estranged son Hunter died of a drug overdose in Dallas, Texas on January 22, 2010.

In June 2019, Green released a self-published autobiography titled "Hunter of Hope: A Life Lived Inside, Outside and On the Ropes." In it, he revisits his life as a teen in Honduras, where, because of his alcoholic father's negligence, he was suffered years of sexual abuse by his father's friends. The golf course was a refuge from this abuse. He explains one reason for the book: "My plan has been simple: Use the adversity as my purpose and reason to live."

== Awards and honors ==
In 2006, Green was inducted into the Connecticut Golf Hall of Fame.

== Amateur wins ==
this list may be incomplete

- 1978 Azalea Invitational

== Professional wins (11) ==
=== PGA Tour wins (5) ===
No.	Date	Tournament	Winning score	Margin of victory	Runner(s)-up
1	Aug 18, 1985	Buick Open	−20 (69-65-67-67=268)	4 strokes	(Australia) Wayne Grady
2	Aug 17, 1986	The International	12 pts (8-4-7-12=12)	3 points	(West Germany) Bernhard Langer
3	Sep 4, 1988	Canadian Open	−13 (70-65-68-72=275)	1 stroke	(United States) Bill Glasson, (United States) Scott Verplank
4	Sep 11, 1988	Greater Milwaukee Open	−20 (70-69-61-68=268)	6 strokes	(United States) Mark Calcavecchia, (United States) Jim Gallagher Jr., (United States) Donnie Hammond, (United States) Dan Pohl
5	Apr 23, 1989	KMart Greater Greensboro Open	−11 (73-66-66-72=277)	2 strokes	(United States) John Huston

PGA Tour playoff record (0–2)

No.	Year	Tournament	Opponent(s)	Result
1	1988	KMart Greater Greensboro Open	(Scotland) Sandy Lyle	Lost to birdie on first extra hole
2	1988	Manufacturers Hanover Westchester Classic	(Spain) Seve Ballesteros, (South Africa) David Frost, (Australia) Greg Norman	Ballesteros won with birdie on first extra hole

=== PGA of Japan Tour wins (1) ===
No.	Date	Tournament	Winning score	Margin of victory	Runner-up
1	Nov 20, 1988	Dunlop Phoenix Tournament	−15 (70-68-64-71=273)	2 strokes	(United States) Fred Couples

=== Asia Golf Circuit wins (1) ===
No.	Date	Tournament	Winning score	Margin of victory	Runners-up
1	Feb 25, 1990	Martell Hong Kong Open	−8 (66-67-72=205) (Note: Shortened to 54 holes due to weather.)	4 strokes	(Canada) Danny Mijovic, (United States) Brian Watts

=== Other wins (4) ===
- 1985 Hassan II Golf Trophy, Connecticut Open
- 1987 Spalding Invitational
- 1992 Connecticut Open

== Results in major championships ==
Tournament	1982	1983	1984	1985	1986	1987	1988	1989
Masters Tournament					44	CUT		T11
U.S. Open	CUT	T26	CUT	T60	WD	T31	T32	T46
The Open Championship						T29		T61
PGA Championship					T26	CUT	CUT	WD

Tournament	1990	1991	1992	1993	1994	1995	1996	1997
Masters Tournament	CUT	T35						CUT
U.S. Open		WD	CUT		CUT		T7	CUT
The Open Championship	CUT					T49		
PGA Championship		T16	WD	WD				

Top 10
Did not play

CUT = missed the half-way cut
WD = withdrew
"T" = tied

=== Summary ===
Tournament	Wins	2nd	3rd	Top-5	Top-10	Top-25	Events	Cuts made
Masters Tournament	0	0	0	0	0	1	6	3
U.S. Open	0	0	0	0	1	1	13	6
The Open Championship	0	0	0	0	0	0	4	3
PGA Championship	0	0	0	0	0	1	7	2
Totals	0	0	0	0	1	3	30	14

- Most consecutive cuts made – 3 (1989 Masters – 1989 Open Championship)
- Longest streak of top-10s – 1

== Results in The Players Championship ==
Tournament	1984	1985	1986	1987	1988	1989	1990	1991	1992	1993	1994	1995	1996
The Players Championship	CUT		T33	T24	CUT	T21	T5	T27	DQ	T6	CUT	T61	T73

Top 10
Did not play

CUT = missed the halfway cut
DQ = disqualified
"T" indicates a tie for a place

== U.S. national team appearances ==
- Four Tours World Championship: 1989 (winners)
- Ryder Cup: 1989 (tied)

== See also ==
- Fall 1981 PGA Tour Qualifying School graduates
- 1982 PGA Tour Qualifying School graduates
- 1984 PGA Tour Qualifying School graduates
- 2002 PGA Tour Qualifying School graduates
- List of American Ryder Cup golfers
- List of Florida Gators men's golfers on the PGA Tour
