= Jim Gallagher Jr. =

American professional golfer and sportscaster (born 1961)

Personal information
- Full name: James Thomas Gallagher Jr.
- Nationality: United States
- Born: March 24, 1961 (age 65) Johnstown, Pennsylvania, U.S.
- Height: 6 ft 0 in (1.83 m)
- Weight: 205 lb (93 kg; 14.6 st)

Career
- Sport: Golf
- College: University of Tennessee
- Turned professional: 1983
- Current tour: Champions Tour
- Former tour: PGA Tour
- Professional wins: 9
- Highest ranking: 26 (September 24, 1995)

Number of wins by tour
- PGA Tour: 5
- Other: 4

Best results in major championships
- Masters Tournament: T17: 1991
- PGA Championship: T2: 1992
- U.S. Open: T11: 1991
- The Open Championship: T47: 1994

James Thomas Gallagher Jr. (born March 24, 1961) is an American professional golfer and sportscaster.

== Early life ==
Gallagher was born in Johnstown, Pennsylvania. His father, a career club pro, started him in golf at age six. His sister, Jackie, and brother, Jeff, both became touring professionals.

Gallagher attended the University of Tennessee in Knoxville.

== Professional career ==
In 1983, Gallagher turned professional. In 1984, he joined the PGA Tour.

Gallagher won five events on the PGA Tour. His first win came in 1990 at the Greater Milwaukee Open. In 1993, he won twice: the Anheuser-Busch Golf Classic and The Tour Championship. He repeated his two-win performance in 1995 by winning the KMart Greater Greensboro Open and the FedEx St. Jude Classic.

Gallagher's best finishes in a major championship were a 3rd-place finish at the 1991 PGA Championship and a T-2 at the same tournament the following year. He was a member of the victorious 1993 Ryder Cup team and the 1994 Presidents Cup team.

=== Broadcasting career ===
Gallagher, who works as a golf analyst for Golf Channel, has appeared in a limited number of events on the Champions Tour since reaching age 50 in 2011. He had two top-10 finishes in this venue in both 2011 and 2013.

== Personal life ==
Gallagher's wife, Cissye, is a former LPGA Tour player. They have four children: Mary Langdon, Thomas, Kathleen, and Elizabeth. Kathleen plays golf at LSU.

Gallagher lives in Greenwood, Mississippi.

== Professional wins (9) ==
=== PGA Tour wins (5) ===
Legend
Tour Championships (1)
Other PGA Tour (4)

No.	Date	Tournament	Winning score	Margin of victory	Runner(s)-up
1	Sep 1, 1990	Greater Milwaukee Open	−17 (69-70-66-66=271)	Playoff	(United States) Ed Dougherty, (United States) Billy Mayfair
2	Jul 11, 1993	Anheuser-Busch Golf Classic	−15 (66-68-70-65=269)	2 strokes	(United States) Chip Beck
3	Oct 31, 1993	The Tour Championship	−7 (63-73-72-69=277)	1 stroke	(South Africa) David Frost, (United States) John Huston, (Australia) Greg Norman, (United States) Scott Simpson
4	Apr 23, 1995	KMart Greater Greensboro Open	−14 (69-70-69-66=274)	1 stroke	(United States) Peter Jacobsen, (United States) Jeff Sluman
5	Jul 2, 1995	FedEx St. Jude Classic	−17 (65-62-68-72=267)	1 stroke	(United States) Jay Delsing, (United States) Ken Green

PGA Tour playoff record (1–1)

No.	Year	Tournament	Opponents	Result
1	1990	Greater Milwaukee Open	(United States) Ed Dougherty, (United States) Billy Mayfair	Won with par on first extra hole
2	1991	NEC World Series of Golf	(United States) Davis Love III, (United States) Tom Purtzer	Purtzer won with par on second extra hole

=== Tournament Players Series wins (2) ===
- 1985 Magnolia State Classic, Charley Pride Golf Fiesta

=== Other wins (2) ===
- 1983 Indiana Open
- 1990 Jerry Ford Invitational (tie with Donnie Hammond and Andy North)

== Results in major championships ==
Tournament	1988	1989	1990	1991	1992	1993	1994	1995	1996	1997	1998	1999	2000	2001	2002
Masters Tournament				T17	T25	CUT	CUT		T29						
U.S. Open	CUT	CUT	T33	T11	T57	CUT	T47	T62	T67						CUT
The Open Championship					CUT	CUT	T47	T55							
PGA Championship		T12	CUT	3	T2	CUT	CUT	T44	T52						

Top 10
Did not play

CUT = missed the half-way cut
"T" indicates a tie for a place

=== Summary ===
Tournament	Wins	2nd	3rd	Top-5	Top-10	Top-25	Events	Cuts made
Masters Tournament	0	0	0	0	0	2	5	3
U.S. Open	0	0	0	0	0	1	10	6
The Open Championship	0	0	0	0	0	0	4	2
PGA Championship	0	1	1	2	2	3	8	5
Totals	0	1	1	2	2	6	27	16

- Most consecutive cuts made – 6 (1995 U.S. Open – 1996 PGA)
- Longest streak of top-10s – 1 (twice)

== U.S. national team appearances ==
- Four Tours World Championship: 1991
- Ryder Cup: 1993 (winners)
- Presidents Cup: 1994 (winners)

== See also ==
- 1983 PGA Tour Qualifying School graduates
