= Calvin Peete =

American professional golfer (1943–2015)

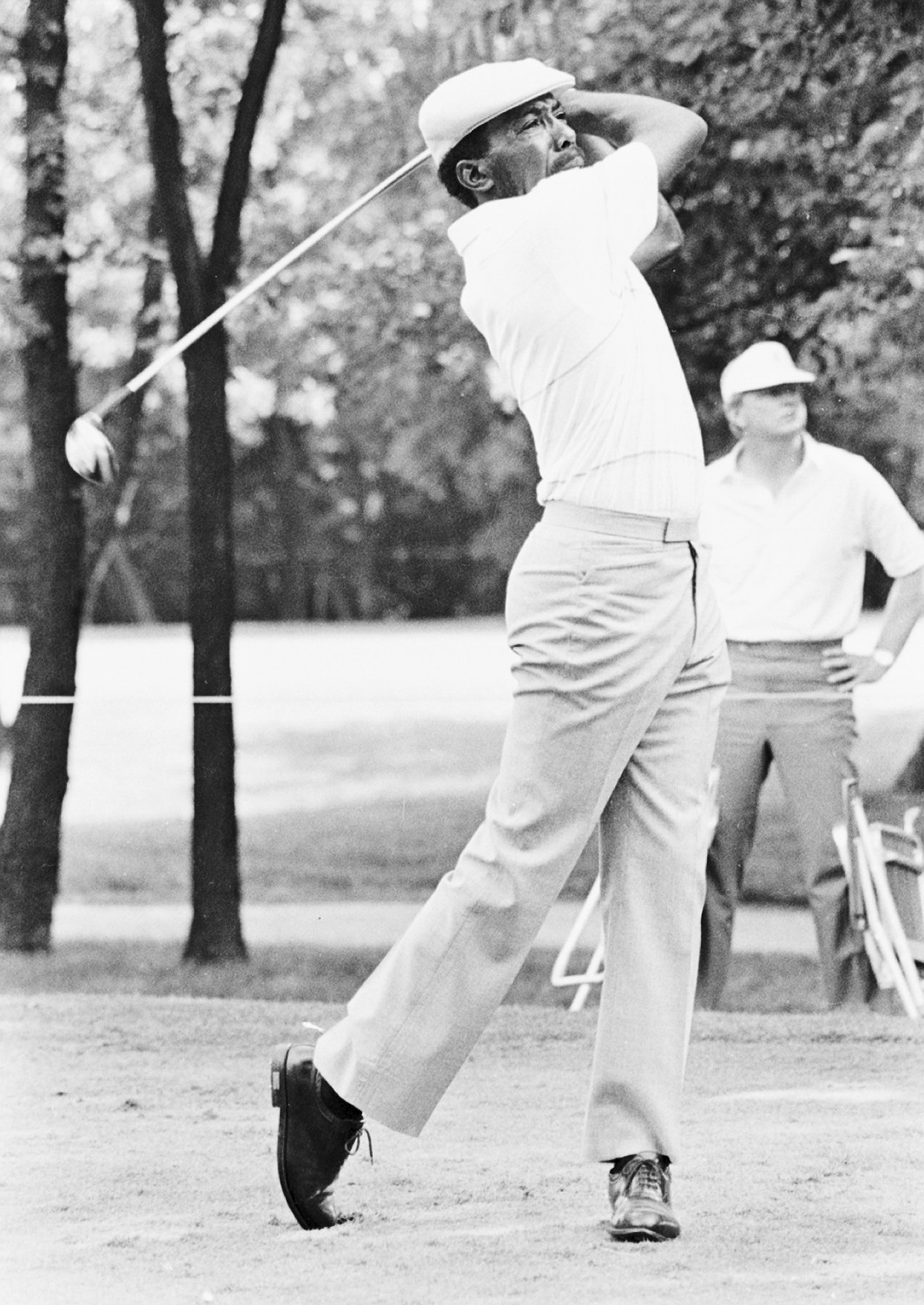
- Peete in 1986

Personal information
- Full name: Calvin Peete
- Nationality: United States
- Born: July 18, 1943 Detroit, Michigan, U.S.
- Died: April 29, 2015 (aged 71) Atlanta, Georgia, U.S.

Career
- Sport: Golf
- Turned professional: 1975
- Former tours: PGA Tour; Champions Tour
- Professional wins: 14

Number of wins by tour
- PGA Tour: 12
- Japan Golf Tour: 2

Best results in major championships
- Masters Tournament: T11: 1986
- PGA Championship: T3: 1982
- U.S. Open: T4: 1983
- The Open Championship: DNP

Achievements and awards
- Byron Nelson Award: 1984
- Vardon Trophy: 1984

Calvin Peete (July 18, 1943 – April 29, 2015) was an American professional golfer. He was the most successful African-American to have played on the PGA Tour, with 12 wins, prior to the emergence of Tiger Woods. Peete won the 1985 Tournament Players Championship and finished the season top-5 on the PGA Tour money list three times; 1982, 1983 and 1985. He was ranked in the top 10 players on the McCormack's World Golf Rankings in 1984.

== Early life ==
Peete was born in Detroit, Michigan as the youngest of nine children. He lived with his grandmother in Hayti, Missouri when the family split up when he was nine years old before eventually moving to Pahokee, Florida when he was 11. His father, determined to raise a new family, would have ten children with his new wife, effectively making Peete the oldest sibling. Growing up poor, Peete suffered a badly broken arm that was never properly set after he fell out a tree at the age of 12. Dropping out of school in the eighth grade, he picked vegetables and sold clothes to help feed his family, doing so when he got himself a peddler's license at the age of 17 and loading a 1956 Plymouth Station Wagon.

Peete did not begin playing golf until he was in his twenties. He learned the game while peddling goods to migrant workers in Rochester, New York in 1966, playing on the public course at Genesee Valley Park when an invitation to a fish fry was actually a trip to a golf course; not having a ride home, he went with "the fool idea" and tried the sport. Having found an interest for it, he quickly made plans to spend days on the golf course and read books on the matter of golf (such as Ben Hogan's Five Lessons) while taking advice on his grip and even made films of his stroke to study. He was so dedicated to have a repeating swing that he would develop it until his hands bled. Going from breaking 80 by six months to breaking par in a year, he eventually was ready to approach competing, turning professional in 1971 to play in the United Golf Association and the National Tournament Golfers Association before going for the PGA qualifying school, where he made the PGA Tour on his third try.

== Professional career ==
Peete successfully graduated onto the PGA Tour at the Spring 1975 PGA Tour Qualifying School. Peete struggled in his early years, winning just barely over $60,000 in his first three years combined. An admitted "poor putter" when he entered the Tour, Peete eventually improved his skills by the end of the decade, stating that any time he would spend in practice during tournament weeks would have time dedicated to putting for multiple hours. He also credited maintaining his balance through swinging the ball as a factor in his control, which he had managed to improve from his earlier years for tempo and rhythm. In 1979, he won the Greater Milwaukee Open, becoming the fourth black man to win a PGA Tour event after Pete Brown, Charlie Sifford, and Lee Elder. In 1981, he finished as the leader in driving accuracy on the PGA Tour, starting a ten-year streak that did not end until 1990. In 1982, Peete took the High School Equivalency Test and passed to earn himself a diploma, having wanted to set an example for his children along with the fact that all Ryder Cup members require a high school degree. The following year, he played for America on the Ryder Cup team; he scored 2.5 points as America won 14 1/2 to 13 1/2. He played on the 1985 team, which lost to Europe.

In 1984, Peete won the Vardon Trophy for lowest scoring average (70.56), albeit not without controversy. In the Heritage Classic, he withdrew after shooting a 41 on the front nine. In the Tournament of Champions, he received a disqualification after forgetting what his score was on a hole, which didn't harm his average and generated a $5,000 fine. The spring after he was awarded the trophy, the PGA and the PGA Tour installed a new rule that was dubbed by some as "the Cal Peete rule" in governing withdrawals and disqualifications that essentially wanted players who teed up on the first hole to finish the round for a score with no exceptions; any withdrawal or disqualification before a round is completed would mean one would be ineligible for the Vardon Trophy or any statistical category for the year.

In 1986, the Official World Golf Ranking began ranking players, with Peete being ranked among the top ten for several weeks. By that year, he had managed to win $1 million in his career earnings since joining the Tour.

After shooting an 87 for a rain-soaked round at the Masters, Peete, annoyed at a question about Masters tradition, stated, "Until Lee Elder, the only Blacks at the Masters were caddies or waiters. To ask a Black man what he feels about the traditions of the Masters is like asking him how he feels about his forefathers who were slaves." When Peete's caddie was asked once about the strategy used to approach the game, he stated, "He goes flag on you."

Peete retired from the Tour in 1993 and joined the Champions Tour, where he competed for eight seasons. Until Tiger Woods, Peete had the most Tour victories among all black golfers. He was inducted into the African American Ethnic Sports Hall of Fame in 2002.

== Personal life ==
Peete was married twice, having five children with his first wife Christine Sears, whom he married in 1973 and divorced in 1987. That same year, having moved to Phoenix, Arizona, he met his second wife Pepper at a scholarship banquet and married her five years later, eventually having two children with her.

In 1999, Peete was formally diagnosed with Tourette syndrome; reportedly, he had been jerking his neck since his childhood along with making noises with his tongue on the roof of his mouth when stressed. In his later days, Peete had both pancreatic and lung cancer. A few months before his death, he had been living in Pompano Beach, Florida before making a call to his friend Warren Barge about wanting to get out of Florida; he eventually was settled into a home in Atlanta, Georgia. Peete died of lung cancer while in hospice care on April 29, 2015; he was 71 years old.

In 2024, he was the subject of a biography titled Calvin Peete: Golf's Forgotten Star by Gordon Hobson. He is a cousin of former NFL quarterback Rodney Peete.

== Professional wins (14) ==
=== PGA Tour wins (12) ===
Legend
Players Championships (1)
Other PGA Tour (11)

No.	Date	Tournament	Winning score	To par	Margin of victory	Runner(s)-up
1	Jul 15, 1979	Greater Milwaukee Open	69-67-68-65=269	−19	5 strokes	(Mexico) Victor Regalado, (United States) Jim Simons, (United States) Lee Trevino
2	Jul 11, 1982	Greater Milwaukee Open (2)	70-66-69-69=274	−14	2 strokes	(Mexico) Victor Regalado
3	Jul 25, 1982	Anheuser-Busch Golf Classic	66-68-69=203*	−10	2 strokes	(United States) Bruce Lietzke
4	Sep 5, 1982	B.C. Open	69-63-64-69=265	−19	7 strokes	(United States) Jerry Pate
5	Oct 24, 1982	Pensacola Open	65-66-72-65=268	−16	7 strokes	(Canada) Dan Halldorson, (United States) Hal Sutton
6	May 22, 1983	Georgia-Pacific Atlanta Golf Classic	68-75-63=206*	−10	2 strokes	(United States) Chip Beck, (United States) Jim Colbert, (United States) Don Pooley
7	Jul 24, 1983	Anheuser-Busch Golf Classic (2)	66-75-66-69=276	−8	1 stroke	(United States) Tim Norris
8	Oct 7, 1984	Texas Open	67-67-66-66=266	−14	3 strokes	(United States) Bruce Lietzke
9	Jan 20, 1985	Phoenix Open	65-65-72-68=270	−14	2 strokes	(United States) Morris Hatalsky, (United States) Doug Tewell
10	Mar 31, 1985	Tournament Players Championship	70-69-69-66=274	−14	3 strokes	(United States) D. A. Weibring
11	Jan 11, 1986	MONY Tournament of Champions	68-67-64-68=267	−21	6 strokes	(United States) Mark O'Meara
12	Mar 23, 1986	USF&G Classic	68-67-66-68=269	−19	5 strokes	(United States) Pat McGowan

*Note: Tournament shortened to 54 holes due to weather.

PGA Tour playoff record (0–1)

No.	Year	Tournament	Opponent	Result
1	1986	Houston Open	(United States) Curtis Strange	Lost to birdie on third extra hole

=== PGA of Japan Tour wins (2) ===
No.	Date	Tournament	Winning score	To par	Margin of victory	Runners-up
1	Nov 7, 1982	Goldwin Cup Japan vs USA	66-68=134	−10	Shared title with (United States) Bob Gilder	
2	Nov 21, 1982	Dunlop Phoenix Tournament	73-69-67-72=281	−7	3 strokes	(Spain) Seve Ballesteros, (United States) Larry Nelson

== Results in major championships ==
Tournament	1976	1977	1978	1979	1980	1981	1982	1983	1984	1985	1986	1987	1988
Masters Tournament					T19	T21	T30	49	T15	T31	T11	T33	
U.S. Open	T23			T11	T28	T14	T10	T4	WD		T24	CUT	
PGA Championship				T42		T43	T3	T36	4	T18	T30	WD	T38

Note: Peete never played in The Open Championship.

Top 10
Did not play

WD = withdrew
CUT = missed the half-way cut
"T" = tied

=== Summary ===
Tournament	Wins	2nd	3rd	Top-5	Top-10	Top-25	Events	Cuts made
Masters Tournament	0	0	0	0	0	4	8	8
U.S. Open	0	0	0	1	2	6	9	7
The Open Championship	0	0	0	0	0	0	0	0
PGA Championship	0	0	1	2	2	3	9	8
Totals	0	0	1	3	4	13	26	23

- Most consecutive cuts made – 22 (1976 U.S. Open – 1987 Masters)
- Longest streak of top-10s – 2 (1982 U.S. Open – 1982 PGA)

== The Players Championship ==
=== Wins (1) ===
Year	Championship	54 holes	Winning score	Margin	Runner-up
1985	Tournament Players Championship	Tied for lead	−14 (70-69-69-66=274)	3 strokes	(United States) D. A. Weibring

=== Results timeline ===
Tournament	1977	1978	1979	1980	1981	1982	1983	1984	1985	1986	1987	1988	1989	1990	1991	1992	1993	1994	1995
The Players Championship	CUT	CUT	CUT	T70	T29	T41	T35		1	CUT	CUT	T16	CUT	T46	76	WD	CUT	WD	WD

Win
Did not play

CUT = missed the halfway cut
WD = withdrew
"T" indicates a tie for a place.

== U.S. national team appearances ==
- Ryder Cup: 1983 (winners), 1985
- Nissan Cup: 1985 (winners), 1986

== See also ==
- Spring 1975 PGA Tour Qualifying School graduates
