= Howard Twitty =

American professional golfer (born 1949)

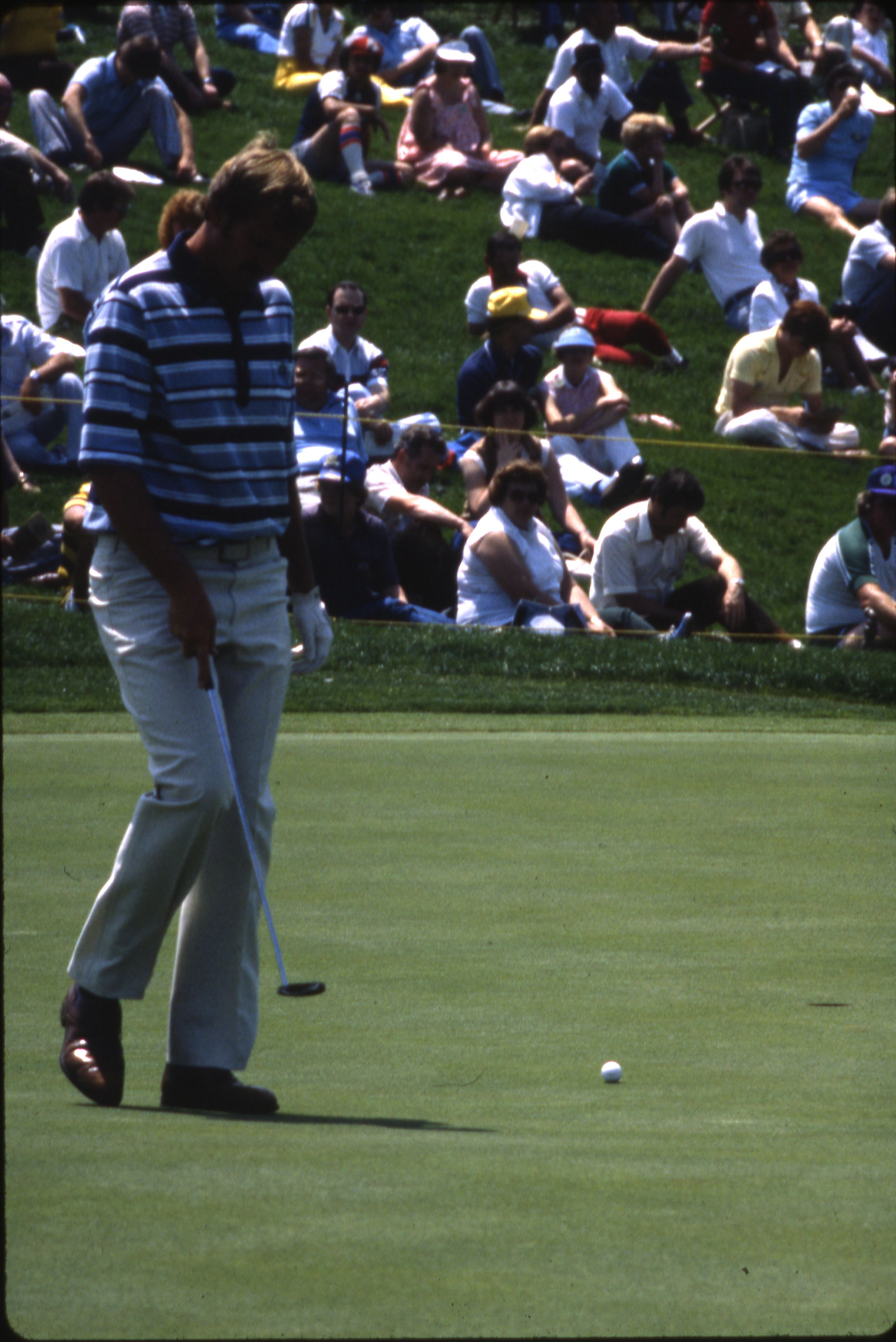
- Twitty in 1980

Personal information
- Full name: Howard Allen Twitty
- Nickname: Tweety Bird
- Nationality: United States
- Born: January 15, 1949 (age 77) Phoenix, Arizona, U.S.
- Height: 6 ft 5 in (1.96 m)
- Weight: 210 lb (95 kg; 15 st)

Career
- Sport: Golf
- College: Arizona State University
- Turned professional: 1974
- Former tours: PGA Tour; Champions Tour
- Professional wins: 4
- Highest ranking: 94 (May 2, 1993)

Number of wins by tour
- PGA Tour: 3

Best results in major championships
- Masters Tournament: T17: 1993
- PGA Championship: T5: 1980
- U.S. Open: T32: 1979
- The Open Championship: T34: 1993

Achievements and awards
- PGA Tour Comeback Player of the Year: 1993

Howard Allen Twitty (born January 15, 1949) is an American professional golfer who played on the PGA Tour and the Senior PGA Tour.

== Early life and amateur career ==
In 1949, Twitty was born in Phoenix, Arizona. In 1972, he graduated from Arizona State University.

== Professional career ==
In 1974, Twitty turned pro. Twitty won three tournaments on the PGA Tour during his career. His best finish in a major tournament was a T-5 at the 1980 PGA Championship. Twitty missed part of the 1996 season due to foot surgery, and now wears sandals with golf spikes while he plays. Twitty played some on the Nationwide Tour in his late forties to prepare for the Senior PGA TOUR. After reaching the age of 50 in 1999, he began play on the senior tour where his best finish was a T-2 at the 2000 Toshiba Senior Classic.

Twitty has done some consulting on golf course design. He collaborated with Roger Maltbie on the well-received redesign of the TPC at River Highlands course in Connecticut, site of the Travelers Championship. He also collaborated with Tom Weiskopf on the TPC Scottsdale redesign, site of the FBR Open.

== Personal life ==
Twitty resides in Paradise Valley, a suburb of Scottsdale, Arizona. He has seven children.

== Awards and honors ==
In 1993, Twitty was honored with PGA Tour Comeback Player of the Year

== Amateur wins (2) ==
- 1970 Porter Cup, Sunnehanna Amateur

== Professional wins (4) ==
=== PGA Tour wins (3) ===
No.	Date	Tournament	Winning score	Margin of victory	Runner-up
1	Sep 2, 1979	B.C. Open	−14 (69-70-64-67=270)	1 stroke	(United States) Tom Purtzer
2	Jul 27, 1980	Sammy Davis Jr.-Greater Hartford Open	−18 (68-66-63-69=266)	Playoff	(United States) Jim Simons
3	Jan 17, 1993	United Airlines Hawaiian Open	−19 (63-68-70-68=269)	4 strokes	(United States) Joey Sindelar

PGA Tour playoff record (1–0)

No.	Year	Tournament	Opponent	Result
1	1980	Sammy Davis Jr.-Greater Hartford Open	(United States) Jim Simons	Won with birdie on sixth extra hole

=== Asia Golf Circuit wins (1) ===
No.	Date	Tournament	Winning score	Margin of victory	Runner-up
1	Mar 2, 1975	Thailand Open	−3 (72-74-70-69=285)	2 strokes	(United States) Tom Purtzer

== Results in major championships ==
Tournament	1971	1972	1973	1974	1975	1976	1977	1978	1979
Masters Tournament									
U.S. Open	CUT								T32
The Open Championship									
PGA Championship						T38		T64	T7

Tournament	1980	1981	1982	1983	1984	1985	1986	1987	1988	1989
Masters Tournament	T38	T40								
U.S. Open	CUT	CUT		CUT		CUT	66			
The Open Championship										
PGA Championship	T5	T43	CUT			T51	CUT	CUT		T27

Tournament	1990	1991	1992	1993	1994	1995	1996	1997	1998
Masters Tournament				T17	T48				
U.S. Open	65			CUT	CUT				CUT
The Open Championship				T34	T47				
PGA Championship		T16	CUT	CUT					

Top 10
Did not play

CUT = missed the half-way cut
"T" indicates a tie for a place

== See also ==
- Spring 1975 PGA Tour Qualifying School graduates
