= John Mahaffey =

American professional golfer (born 1948)

Personal information
- Full name: John Drayton Mahaffey Jr.
- Nationality: United States
- Born: May 9, 1948 (age 78) Kerrville, Texas, U.S.
- Height: 5 ft 9 in (1.75 m)
- Weight: 160 lb (73 kg; 11 st)

Career
- Sport: Golf
- College: University of Houston
- Turned professional: 1971
- Former tours: PGA Tour; Champions Tour
- Professional wins: 16

Number of wins by tour
- PGA Tour: 10
- PGA Tour Champions: 1
- Other: 5

Best results in major championships (wins: 1)
- Masters Tournament: T8: 1981
- PGA Championship: Won: 1978
- U.S. Open: 2nd: 1975
- The Open Championship: T10: 1975

John Drayton Mahaffey Jr. (born May 9, 1948) is an American professional golfer who has won numerous tournaments including 10 PGA Tour events.

== Early life ==
Mahaffey was born in Kerrville, Texas. He attended the University of Houston in Houston, Texas. Mahaffey graduated in 1970 with a degree in psychology.

== Professional career ==
In 1971, Mahaffey turned pro. He came close to winning back-to-back U.S. Opens. At the 1975 U.S. Open he lost in a playoff to Lou Graham at the Medinah Country Club in Medinah, Illinois. The following year, at the 1976 U.S. Open, Mahaffey had a two-shot lead after 54 holes at the Atlanta Athletic Club in Johns Creek, Georgia before shooting a final round 73 and finishing T-4.

In 1978, he won the PGA Championship. It was held at Oakmont Country Club in Oakmont, Pennsylvania. Mahaffey became the best comeback winner in PGA history after trailing Tom Watson by seven strokes with 14 holes to play. Ultimately, the tournament came down to a three-player playoff – Mahaffey, Watson and Jerry Pate. All three players made par on the first playoff hole. The drama ended on the second playoff hole when Pate missed the green, Watson missed a 30-foot birdie attempt and Mahaffey made his 12-foot birdie putt for the Championship. Later in the year he also won the World Cup individual and team event where he was paired with Andy North in 1978.

Mahaffey played on the 1979 Ryder Cup team the following year.

Later in his career, he began work as an announcer on Golf Channel telecasts of the PGA Tour Champions.

== Personal life ==
Mahaffey lives near Houston at The Woodlands in his home state of Texas.

== Amateur wins ==
- 1970 NCAA Championship

== Professional wins (16) ==
=== PGA Tour wins (10) ===
Legend
Major championships (1)
Players Championships (1)
Other PGA Tour (8)

No.	Date	Tournament	Winning score	Margin of victory	Runner(s)-up
1	Oct 28, 1973	Sahara Invitational	−13 (68-66-69-68=271)	3 strokes	(United States) Dave Eichelberger
2	Aug 6, 1978	PGA Championship	−8 (75-67-68-66=276)	Playoff	(United States) Jerry Pate, (United States) Tom Watson
3	Aug 13, 1978	American Optical Classic	−14 (71-65-67-67=270)	2 strokes	(United States) Raymond Floyd, (United States) Gil Morgan
4	Jan 14, 1979	Bob Hope Desert Classic	−17 (66-66-71-71-69=343)	1 stroke	(United States) Lee Trevino
5	Jun 1, 1980	Kemper Open	−5 (68-72-67-68=275)	3 strokes	(United States) Craig Stadler
6	July 26, 1981	Anheuser-Busch Golf Classic	−8 (72-67-70-67=276)	2 strokes	(United States) Andy North
7	Jan 15, 1984	Bob Hope Classic (2)	−20 (66-70-70-68-66=340)	Playoff	(United States) Jim Simons
8	Sep 29, 1985	Texas Open	−12 (68-68-65-67=268)	Playoff	(United States) Jodie Mudd
9	Mar 30, 1986	Tournament Players Championship	−13 (69-70-65-71=275)	1 stroke	(United States) Larry Mize
10	Aug 6, 1989	Federal Express St. Jude Classic	−12 (70-71-66-65=272)	3 strokes	(United States) Bob Gilder, (United States) Hubert Green, (West Germany) Bernhard Langer, (United States) Bob Tway

PGA Tour playoff record (3–2)

No.	Year	Tournament	Opponent(s)	Result
1	1975	U.S. Open	(United States) Lou Graham	Lost 18-hole playoff; Graham: E (71), Mahaffey: +2 (73)
2	1978	PGA Championship	(United States) Jerry Pate, (United States) Tom Watson	Won with birdie on second extra hole
3	1984	Bob Hope Desert Classic	(United States) Jim Simons	Won with par on second extra hole
4	1985	Anheuser-Busch Golf Classic	(United States) Mark Wiebe	Lost to birdie on first extra hole
5	1985	Texas Open	(United States) Jodie Mudd	Won with par on second extra hole

=== Other wins (5) ===
No.	Date	Tournament	Winning score	Margin of victory	Runner(s)-up
1	Dec 3, 1978	World Cup (with (United States) Andy North)	−12 (141-144-138-141=564)	10 strokes	Australia − Wayne Grady and Greg Norman
2	Dec 3, 1978	World Cup Individual Trophy	−7 (69-72-69-71=281)	2 strokes	(United States) Andy North
3	Nov 11, 1979	World Cup (2) (with (United States) Hale Irwin)	−1 (141-141-152-141=575)	5 strokes	Scotland − Ken Brown and Sandy Lyle
4	Jan 4, 1981	Spalding Invitational	−9 (69-69-69-72=279)	1 stroke	(United States) Buddy Allin
5	Dec 12, 1982	JCPenney Mixed Team Classic (with (United States) JoAnne Carner)	−20 (68-67-63-70=268)	1 stroke	(United States) Jay Haas and (United States) Hollis Stacy

=== Senior PGA Tour wins (1) ===
No.	Date	Tournament	Winning score	Margin of victory	Runners-up
1	Jun 20, 1999	Southwestern Bell Dominion	−12 (67-67-70=204)	Playoff	(Spain) José María Cañizares, (United States) Bruce Fleisher

Senior PGA Tour playoff record (1–1)

No.	Year	Tournament	Opponent(s)	Result
1	1999	Southwestern Bell Dominion	(Spain) José María Cañizares, (United States) Bruce Fleisher	Won with birdie on second extra hole Fleisher eliminated by birdie on first hole
2	2002	FleetBoston Classic	(United States) Bob Gilder	Lost to birdie on third extra hole

== Major championships ==
=== Wins (1) ===
Year	Championship	54 holes	Winning score	Margin	Runners-up
1978	PGA Championship	7 shot deficit	−8 (75-67-68-66=276)	Playoff^{1}	(United States) Jerry Pate, (United States) Tom Watson

^{1}Defeated Pate and Watson with a birdie on the second extra hole.

=== Results timeline ===
Tournament	1970	1971	1972	1973	1974	1975	1976	1977	1978	1979
Masters Tournament					CUT	CUT	T39			
U.S. Open	T36 LA		CUT	T29	T12	2	T4			T36
The Open Championship					T44	T10				
PGA Championship				T30	T9	T28	WD		1	T51

Tournament	1980	1981	1982	1983	1984	1985	1986	1987	1988	1989
Masters Tournament	T44	T8	CUT	T40	CUT	T14	T42	T35		
U.S. Open	T28	CUT	T22	T34	T30	T39	CUT	T24		T46
The Open Championship	T32						T30			
PGA Championship	T15	CUT	T42	CUT	T20	T23	CUT	T65	T15	CUT

Tournament	1990	1991	1992	1993	1994	1995	1996	1997
Masters Tournament	T42							
U.S. Open	CUT			CUT	CUT	CUT		
The Open Championship								
PGA Championship	T40	CUT	CUT	CUT	CUT	CUT		WD

Win
Top 10
Did not play

LA = Low amateur
CUT = missed the halfway cut
WD = Withdrew
"T" indicates a tie for a place.

=== Summary ===
Tournament	Wins	2nd	3rd	Top-5	Top-10	Top-25	Events	Cuts made
Masters Tournament	0	0	0	0	1	2	12	8
U.S. Open	0	1	0	2	2	5	20	13
The Open Championship	0	0	0	0	1	1	4	4
PGA Championship	1	0	0	1	2	6	23	12
Totals	1	1	0	3	6	14	59	37

- Most consecutive cuts made – 8 (1978 PGA – 1981 Masters)
- Longest streak of top-10s – 2 (1975 U.S. Open – 1975 Open Championship)

== The Players Championship ==
=== Wins (1) ===
Year	Championship	54 holes	Winning score	Margin	Runner-up
1986	Tournament Players Championship	4 shot deficit	−13 (69-70-65-71=275)	1 stroke	(United States) Larry Mize

=== Results timeline ===
Tournament	1974	1975	1976	1977	1978	1979	1980	1981	1982	1983	1984	1985	1986	1987	1988	1989	1990	1991	1992	1993	1994	1995	1996
The Players Championship	T19	T11	T34		T12		T5	T19	T35	T3	T10	CUT	1	T32	T27	T45	CUT	CUT	T9	CUT	T27	T55	CUT

Win
Top 10
Did not play

CUT = missed the halfway cut
"T" indicates a tie for a place.

== U.S. national team appearances ==
Professional

- Ryder Cup: 1979 (winners)
- World Cup: 1978 (winners, individual winner), 1979 (winners)
- Nissan Cup: 1986

== See also ==
- 1971 PGA Tour Qualifying School graduates
- List of men's major championships winning golfers
