= Tim Norris =

American golfer and coach

Personal information
- Nationality: United States
- Born: October 20, 1957 (age 69) Fresno, California, U.S.
- Spouse: Shelley Kerr
- Children: 2

Career
- Sport: Golf
- College: Fresno City College; Fresno State University
- Turned professional: 1981
- Former tour: PGA Tour
- Professional wins: 4

Number of wins by tour
- PGA Tour: 1

Best results in major championships
- Masters Tournament: CUT: 1983
- PGA Championship: T40: 1985
- U.S. Open: CUT: 1981, 1982, 1984, 1985
- The Open Championship: DNP

Tim Norris (born October 20, 1957) is a current college head golf coach and a former professional golfer who played on the PGA Tour in the 1980s.

== Early life and amateur career ==
Norris was born and raised in Fresno, California. He started his collegiate career at Fresno City College before transferring to Fresno State University. In 1979, he was a second-team All-American, helped lead Fresno State to the Big West Championship, and was the winner of the Sun Bowl Golf Classic. In 1980, he was a first-team All-American, shared Big West Athlete-of-the-Year honors with Jay Don Blake, helped lead Fresno State to its second Big West Championship in as many years, and was Fresno State's Athlete-of-the-Year.

== Professional career ==
Norris had 11 top-10 finishes in PGA Tour events including a win at the 1982 Sammy Davis Jr.-Greater Hartford Open. Norris established the tournament record at 259 (25-under), which stood until it was eclipsed in 2009 by Kenny Perry. He was only one of two players to go wire-to-wire without sharing the lead. He defeated Raymond Floyd and Hubert Green by six strokes. His best finish in a major was T-40 at the 1985 PGA Championship.

In the 1990s, Norris switch careers from touring professional to college coach. He was men's head golf coach at University of Texas-El Paso from 1990–1997. Since August 1, 1997, he has been the men's head golf coach at Kansas State University in Manhattan, Kansas. When he arrived at K-State, he inherited a program that had finished dead last in the Big Eight Conference for 14 straight years from 1978–1991. Norris has made steady progress transforming the Wildcat's into winners; they appeared in the NCAA Regionals in 2003, 2004 and 2005. During the 2003-2004 season, the Wildcats won the Purina Classic in St. Charles, Missouri, and finished T-4 in the final Big 12 Conference standings.

== Personal life ==
Norris is married to the former Shelley Kerr. They have two children and live in Omaha, Nebraska.

== Awards and honors ==
- In 1979, Norris earned second-team All-American honors and the following year was a first-team All-American.
- In 1980, he shared the Big West's Conference's Athlete-of-the-Year honors with Jay Don Blake.
- In 1980, Norris was also Fresno State's Athlete-of-the-Year.

== Professional wins (4) ==
=== PGA Tour wins (1) ===
No.	Date	Tournament	Winning score	Margin of victory	Runners-up
1	Aug 15, 1982	Sammy Davis Jr.-Greater Hartford Open	−25 (63-64-66-66=259)	6 strokes	(United States) Raymond Floyd, (United States) Hubert Green

=== Other wins (3) ===
- 1980 California State Open
- 1986 Spalding Invitational
- 1992 Sun Country PGA Championship

== Results in major championships ==
Tournament	1981	1982	1983	1984	1985
Masters Tournament			CUT		
U.S. Open	CUT	CUT		CUT	CUT
PGA Championship			CUT	CUT	T40

Note: Norris never played in The Open Championship.

Did not play

CUT = missed the half-way cut
"T" = tied

== See also ==
- Fall 1980 PGA Tour Qualifying School graduates
- 1986 PGA Tour Qualifying School graduates
- 1987 PGA Tour Qualifying School graduates
