= Tom Purtzer =

American professional golfer (born 1951)

Personal information
- Full name: Thomas Warren Purtzer
- Nationality: United States
- Born: December 5, 1951 (age 74) Des Moines, Iowa, U.S.
- Height: 6 ft 0 in (1.83 m)
- Weight: 210 lb (95 kg; 15 st)

Career
- Sport: Golf
- College: Arizona State University
- Turned professional: 1973
- Former tours: PGA Tour; Champions Tour
- Professional wins: 15
- Highest ranking: 28 (January 19, 1992)

Number of wins by tour
- PGA Tour: 5
- Japan Golf Tour: 1
- PGA Tour Champions: 4
- Other: 5

Best results in major championships
- Masters Tournament: T24: 1989
- PGA Championship: T16: 1982
- U.S. Open: 4th: 1977
- The Open Championship: T4: 1982

Thomas Warren Purtzer (born December 5, 1951) is an American professional golfer. Purtzer won a number of tournaments on both the PGA Tour and the Champions Tour.

== Early life and amateur career ==
Purtzer was born in Des Moines, Iowa. He attended Arizona State University in Tempe, where he was a member of the school's golf team. He graduated in 1973.

== Professional career ==
In 1973, he turned pro. Purtzer is often described in golf literature as having the "sweetest swing in golf". He won five tournaments on the PGA Tour in three different decades, and won four times on the Champions Tour. His best finishes in major championships were 4th at the 1977 U.S. Open and T4 at the 1982 Open Championship.

== Personal life ==
His brother, Paul Purtzer, was also a professional golfer who played on the PGA Tour. Purtzer and his brother operate Purtzer Performance Golf School and Academy in Phoenix, Arizona.

Purtzer lives in Scottsdale, Arizona.

== Professional wins (15) ==
=== PGA Tour wins (5) ===
No.	Date	Tournament	Winning score	Margin of victory	Runner(s)-up
1	Feb 20, 1977	Glen Campbell-Los Angeles Open	−11 (68-67-66-72=273)	1 stroke	(United States) Lanny Wadkins
2	Jan 22, 1984	Phoenix Open	−16 (68-67-68-65=268)	1 stroke	(United States) Corey Pavin
3	Oct 9, 1988	Gatlin Brothers-Southwest Golf Classic	−19 (64-72-69-64=269)	Playoff	(United States) Mark Brooks
4	May 26, 1991	Southwestern Bell Colonial	−13 (70-66-67-64=267)	3 strokes	(United States) David Edwards, (United States) Scott Hoch, (United States) Bob Lohr
5	Aug 25, 1991	NEC World Series of Golf	−1 (72-69-67-71=279)	Playoff	(United States) Jim Gallagher Jr., (United States) Davis Love III

PGA Tour playoff record (2–0)

No.	Year	Tournament	Opponent(s)	Result
1	1988	Gatlin Brothers-Southwest Golf Classic	(United States) Mark Brooks	Won with par on first extra hole
2	1991	NEC World Series of Golf	(United States) Jim Gallagher Jr., (United States) Davis Love III	Won with par on second extra hole

=== PGA of Japan Tour wins (1) ===
No.	Date	Tournament	Winning score	Margin of victory	Runner-up
1	Nov 11, 1979	ABC Japan vs USA Golf Matches	−12 (69-67-68-72=276)	10 strokes	(United States) Bill Rogers

=== Other wins (4) ===
No.	Date	Tournament	Winning score	Margin of victory	Runners-up
1	Jul 7, 1981	Jerry Ford Invitational	−10 (69-63=132)	1 stroke	(United States) John Cook, (United States) Craig Stadler, (United States) Curtis Strange
2	Dec 7, 1986	JCPenney Classic (with (United States) Juli Inkster)	−23 (61-69-66-69=265)	2 strokes	(United States) Mike Hulbert and (United States) Val Skinner
3	Nov 24, 1991	Shark Shootout (with (United States) Lanny Wadkins)	−27 (61-65-63=189)	4 strokes	(United States) Jack Nicklaus and (Australia) Greg Norman
4	Aug 24, 1993	Fred Meyer Challenge (with (Australia) Steve Elkington)	−16 (63-63=128)	1 stroke	(United States) Fred Couples and (United States) Davis Love III, (United States) Brad Faxon and (United States) Rick Fehr, (United States) Jim Gallagher Jr. and (United States) Bruce Lietzke

Other playoff record (0–1)

No.	Year	Tournament	Opponents	Result
1	1985	Chrysler Team Championship (with (United States) Jim Colbert)	(United States) Charlie Bolling and (United States) Brad Fabel, (United States) Raymond Floyd and (United States) Hal Sutton, (United States) John Fought and (United States) Pat McGowan, (United States) Gary Hallberg and (United States) Scott Hoch	Floyd/Sutton won with birdie on first extra hole

=== Champions Tour wins (4) ===
No.	Date	Tournament	Winning score	Margin of victory	Runner(s)-up
1	Mar 16, 2003	SBC Classic	−9 (67-68=135) (Note: Shortened to 36/54 holes due to weather.)	1 stroke	(United States) Gil Morgan
2	Mar 21, 2004	Toshiba Senior Classic	−15 (60-71-67=198)	1 stroke	(United States) Morris Hatalsky
3	Aug 7, 2005	3M Championship	−15 (63-69-69=201)	1 stroke	(United States) Lonnie Nielsen, (United States) Craig Stadler
4	Mar 18, 2007	AT&T Champions Classic	−10 (69-69-68=206)	Playoff	(United States) Loren Roberts

Champions Tour playoff record (1–1)

No.	Year	Tournament	Opponent(s)	Result
1	2005	Bank of America Championship	(Republic of Ireland) Mark McNulty, (United States) Don Pooley	McNulty won with birdie on second extra hole
2	2007	AT&T Champions Classic	(United States) Loren Roberts	Won with birdie on fourth extra hole

=== PGA of Australia Legends Tour wins (1) ===
No.	Date	Tournament	Winning score	Margin of victory	Runner-up
1	Apr 9, 2005	Titanium Enterprises Australian PGA Seniors Championship	−10 (67-68-71=206)	5 strokes	(Scotland) John Chillas

== Results in major championships ==
Tournament	1976	1977	1978	1979
Masters Tournament		CUT	T37	
U.S. Open	T44	4	T24	8
The Open Championship				
PGA Championship		CUT	T54	CUT

Tournament	1980	1981	1982	1983	1984	1985	1986	1987	1988	1989
Masters Tournament	32				T25	CUT				T24
U.S. Open	CUT	CUT	CUT		T16			T68		
The Open Championship			T4	CUT						
PGA Championship	CUT	T19	T16	CUT	CUT		CUT	T47	CUT	T53

Tournament	1990	1991	1992	1993	1994	1995	1996	1997
Masters Tournament	T45		T61					
U.S. Open		T37	T33				T32	
The Open Championship			T22	T70				T62
PGA Championship	T31	T32	T21				CUT	

Top 10
Did not play

CUT = missed the half-way cut
"T" = tied

=== Summary ===
Tournament	Wins	2nd	3rd	Top-5	Top-10	Top-25	Events	Cuts made
Masters Tournament	0	0	0	0	0	2	8	6
U.S. Open	0	0	0	1	2	4	12	9
The Open Championship	0	0	0	1	1	2	5	4
PGA Championship	0	0	0	0	0	3	16	8
Totals	0	0	0	2	3	11	41	27

- Most consecutive cuts made – 12 (1989 Masters – 1996 Open Championship)
- Longest streak of top-10s – 1 (three times)

== Results in The Players Championship ==
Tournament	1977	1978	1979
The Players Championship	T59	CUT	CUT

Tournament	1980	1981	1982	1983	1984	1985	1986	1987	1988	1989
The Players Championship	CUT	T19	CUT	T19	T41	T40	T48	T9	T45	T55

Tournament	1990	1991	1992	1993	1994	1995	1996	1997	1998	1999
The Players Championship	T3	CUT	CUT	CUT	CUT	CUT	T62	T24	CUT	CUT

Tournament	2000	2001
The Players Championship	CUT	CUT

Top 10

CUT = missed the halfway cut
"T" indicates a tie for a place

== U.S. national team appearances ==
- Four Tours World Championship: 1991

== See also ==
- Spring 1975 PGA Tour Qualifying School graduates
