= Donnie Hammond =

American professional golfer (born 1957)

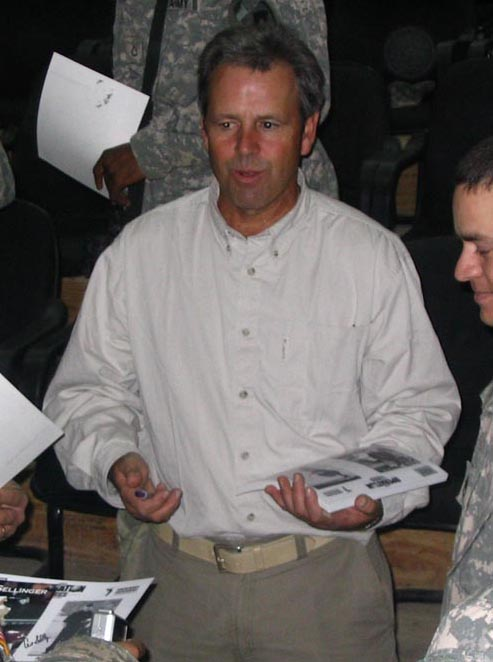

Personal information
- Full name: Donald William Hammond
- Nationality: United States
- Born: April 1, 1957 (age 69) Frederick, Maryland, U.S.
- Height: 5 ft 10 in (1.78 m)
- Weight: 170 lb (77 kg; 12 st)
- Spouse: Trenny
- Children: Matt, Brittany, Brooke, Halle

Career
- Sport: Golf
- College: Jacksonville University
- Turned professional: 1979
- Current tour: Champions Tour
- Former tour: PGA Tour
- Professional wins: 7
- Highest ranking: 55 (September 16, 1990)

Number of wins by tour
- PGA Tour: 2
- Korn Ferry Tour: 1
- Other: 4

Best results in major championships
- Masters Tournament: T11: 1986
- PGA Championship: T11: 1986
- U.S. Open: T23: 1992
- The Open Championship: T5: 1992

Donald William Hammond (born April 1, 1957) is an American professional golfer who has played on the PGA Tour, Nationwide Tour, and Champions Tour.

== Career ==
In 1957, Hammond was born in Frederick, Maryland. He attended Jacksonville University in Jacksonville, Florida and was a member of the golf team.

In 1979, Hammond turned pro and joined the PGA Tour in 1983. Hammond earned his tour card by being medalist at the 1982 PGA Tour Qualifying School at TPC-Sawgrass by a record 14 strokes.

Hammond has won two PGA Tour events in his career: The 1986 Bob Hope Chrysler Classic and the 1989 Texas Open. In winning his second PGA Tour title by seven strokes (258) over Paul Azinger, he came within one stroke of the then-Tour scoring record. His best finish in a major is a T-5 at the 1992 British Open. During his PGA Tour career, he amassed 40 top-10 finishes.

Hammond played on the Tour from 1983 until 1998. After his PGA Tour career declined, he competed on what was then the Buy.com Tour, where he won once in 2000. On turning fifty years of age in 2007, Hammond began playing on the Champions Tour.

== Personal life ==
Hammond has four children, one son Matthew, three daughters Brittany, Brooke, and Halle. He lives in Heathrow, Florida, north of Orlando.

== Awards and honors ==
Hammond is a charter member of the Jacksonville University Sports Hall of Fame.

== Professional wins (7) ==
=== PGA Tour wins (2) ===
No.	Date	Tournament	Winning score	Margin of victory	Runner-up
1	Jan 19, 1986	Bob Hope Chrysler Classic	−25 (69-64-68-68-66=335)	Playoff	(United States) John Cook
2	Oct 8, 1989	Texas Open	−22 (65-64-65-64=258)	7 strokes	(United States) Paul Azinger

PGA Tour playoff record (1–0)

No.	Year	Tournament	Opponent	Result
1	1986	Bob Hope Chrysler Classic	(United States) John Cook	Won with birdie on first extra hole

=== Buy.com Tour wins (1) ===
No.	Date	Tournament	Winning score	Margin of victory	Runners-up
1	Feb 13, 2000	Buy.com Lakeland Classic	−16 (67-68-70-67=272)	1 stroke	(United States) Jeff Gallagher, (United States) Tom Kalinowski

=== Other wins (4) ===
- 1982 Florida Open
- 1989 Jerry Ford Invitational (tie with Ted Schulz)
- 1990 Jerry Ford Invitational (tie with Jim Gallagher Jr. and Andy North)
- 1993 Jerry Ford Invitational (tie with Jay Delsing, and Jim Thorpe)

== Results in major championships ==
Tournament	1981	1982	1983	1984	1985	1986	1987	1988	1989
Masters Tournament						T11	T27		
U.S. Open	CUT	CUT	T60			CUT	T71		
The Open Championship						T65			
PGA Championship				T16	T32	T11	T47	T31	CUT

Tournament	1990	1991	1992	1993	1994	1995	1996	1997	1998	1999
Masters Tournament	T24	T42								
U.S. Open	CUT		T23					T77		
The Open Championship	T8	T44	T5	CUT						
PGA Championship	T63			T61	T74					

Tournament	2000	2001	2002
Masters Tournament			
U.S. Open		CUT	T37
The Open Championship			
PGA Championship			

Top 10
Did not play

CUT = missed the half-way cut
"T" = tied

=== Summary ===
Tournament	Wins	2nd	3rd	Top-5	Top-10	Top-25	Events	Cuts made
Masters Tournament	0	0	0	0	0	2	4	4
U.S. Open	0	0	0	0	0	1	10	5
The Open Championship	0	0	0	1	2	2	5	4
PGA Championship	0	0	0	0	0	2	9	8
Totals	0	0	0	1	2	7	28	21

- Most consecutive cuts made – 6 (1990 Open Championship – 1992 Open Championship)
- Longest streak of top-10s – 1 (twice)

== See also ==
- 1982 PGA Tour Qualifying School graduates
- 1991 PGA Tour Qualifying School graduates
- 1996 PGA Tour Qualifying School graduates
- 2002 PGA Tour Qualifying School graduates
