= Jay Delsing =

American professional golfer (born 1960)

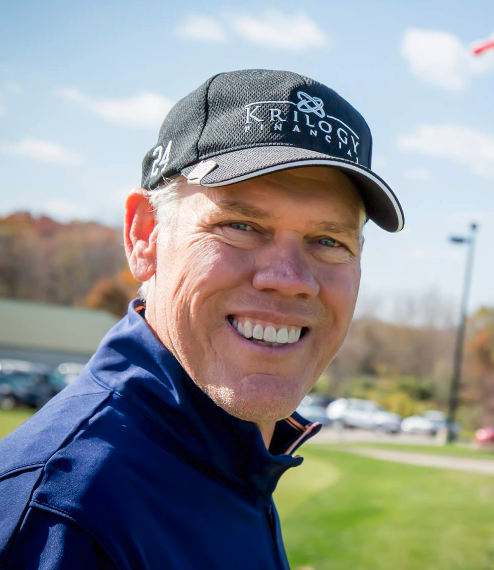
- Delsing in 2021

Personal information
- Nationality: United States
- Born: October 17, 1960 (age 66) St. Louis, Missouri, U.S.
- Height: 6 ft 5 in (1.96 m)
- Weight: 210 lb (95 kg; 15 st)

Career
- Sport: Golf
- College: UCLA
- Turned professional: 1984
- Current tour: Champions Tour
- Former tours: PGA Tour; Nationwide Tour
- Professional wins: 4

Number of wins by tour
- Korn Ferry Tour: 2
- Other: 2

Best results in major championships
- Masters Tournament: DNP
- PGA Championship: T63: 1990
- U.S. Open: T33: 1992
- The Open Championship: T88: 1995

Jay Delsing (born October 17, 1960) is an American professional golfer.

== Early life ==
Delsing was born in St. Louis, Missouri. Delsing's father, Jim, was an outfielder in Major League Baseball for the Chicago White Sox, New York Yankees, St. Louis Browns, Detroit Tigers, and Kansas City A's from 1948 to 1960.

Delsing grew up in the North County Area of the St. Louis region. He learned golf at the now demolished North Shore Country Club that formerly was on the banks of the Mississippi River near the historic Chain of Rocks Bridge.

== Amateur career ==
Delsing played college golf at UCLA with Corey Pavin, Steve Pate, Tom Pernice Jr., and Duffy Waldorf. He is third all-time in tournament victories for UCLA men's golf with seven. This includes four victories in the 1981–82 season. Delsing is only behind Pavin's eleven and Waldorf's nine.

Delsing was second-team All-Pac-10 in 1981, and first-team in 1982 and 1983. He was a key member of two Pacific-10 title teams. Delsing earned first-team All-America honors in 1982 and second team in 1983. In 1983, he graduated from UCLA with a degree in economics.

== Professional career ==
In 1984, Delsing turned pro. He competed in 565 PGA Tour events in his career. His best finishes on the PGA Tour are runner-up finishes at the 1993 New England Classic and the 1995 FedEx St. Jude Classic. He also had 3 third-place finishes, 11 top-5 finishes, and 30 top-10 finishes on the PGA Tour.

Delsing currently ranks 15th in PGA Tour history with five holes-in-one. His most famous came at the 1991 Phoenix Open on the 16th hole. While playing a practice round for a corporate function at Greystone Golf Club in Ontario, California, Delsing made a hole-in-one on the 301-yard par-4, 15th hole. The club added a plaque to commemorate the accomplishment.

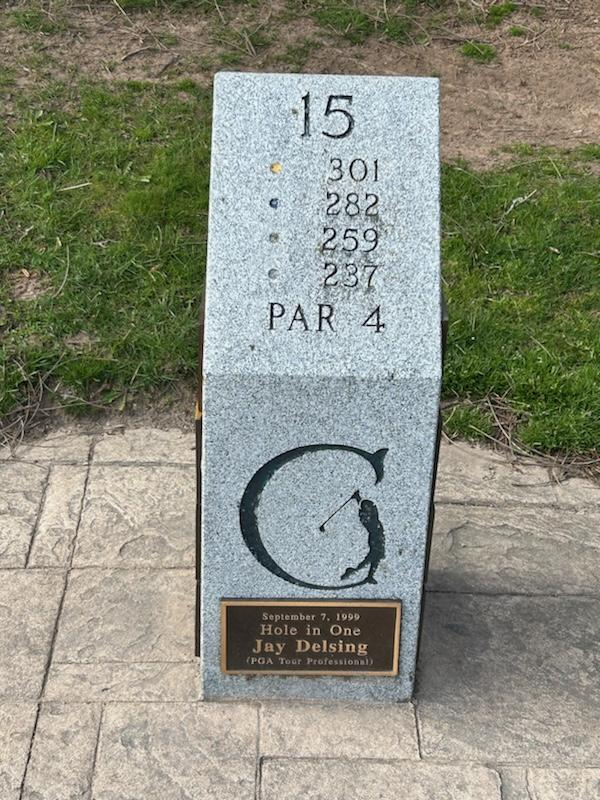
Plaque on 15th hole at Greystone Golf Club commemorating Delsing's hole-in-one.

Over the course of his career, Delsing matched or broke a number of course records. In the second round of the 1985 B.C. Open, Delsing tied the En-Joie Golf Club course record by shooting a −9 round of 62. In the fourth round of the 1993 Federal Express St. Jude Classic, Delsing set a course record that still stands by shooting a −10, 61. In the second round of 2002 Buy.com Tour Championship, Delsing set a tournament record with a –9, 63 on the Robert Trent Jones Golf Trail in Alabama.

=== Senior career ===
Delsing has appeared in 15 tournaments on the PGA Champions Tour. He has made the cut in all 15. In 2015, he competed in the U.S. Senior Open at Del Paso Country Club in Sacramento, California while simultaneously covering the event as an on course commentator for Fox Sports. He finished the tournament tied for 54th place.

In 2015, Delsing joined Fox Sports as an on-course commentator and broadcaster.

Since 2019, Delsing has hosted Golf with Jay Delsing on 101.1 ESPN Radio in St. Louis Missouri. His current co-host is Dan McLaughlin, the long-time TV voice of the St. Louis Cardinals on Bally Sports.

== Awards and honors ==
- In 2020 Delsing was inducted in to the St. Louis Sports Hall of Fame. Upon his induction he said “There is one thing I learned long ago: our days on the golf course are special not because of the quality of the golf that we play, but because of the quality of the people that we play with.”
- In 2023 Delsing was inducted into the Missouri Sports Hall of Fame for his career and life in golf. He spoke about the people that helped his career in golf at his induction. “My entire family was really important as a youngster,” he said. “In college Corey Pavin and Steve Pate were extremely important to me. As a pro Andy North helped me early in my career and Bob Rotella was a huge factor. My brother, Bart, and my close friends Tim Twellman and John Perles have had the most positive impact overall in my career.”

== Autobiography release ==
In June 2025, Delsing released his autobiography titled You Wouldn't Believe Me If I Told You: An Unforgettable Memoir of Golf, Grit, and a Blue-Collar Kid on the PGA Tour via publisher Mascot Books with co-author Will Saulsbery. The foreword of the book was written by Jack Nicklaus and the introduction was written by David Feherty. The book is a non-linear collection of stories from Delsing's life on and off of the PGA Tour. The book won runner-up for sports book of the year from the American Writing Awards for 2025.

== Professional wins (4) ==
=== Buy.com Tour wins (2) ===
| No. | Date | Tournament | Winning score | Margin of victory | Runner-up |
|---|---|---|---|---|---|
| 1 | Aug 12, 2001 | Buy.com Fort Smith Classic | −17 (66-66-66-65=263) | Playoff | (United States) Jeff Freeman |
| 2 | Aug 4, 2002 | Omaha Classic | −21 (66-66-67-68=267) | 1 stroke | (Australia) Anthony Painter |

Buy.com Tour playoff record (1–0)

| No. | Year | Tournament | Opponent | Result |
|---|---|---|---|---|
| 1 | 2001 | Buy.com Fort Smith Classic | (United States) Jeff Freeman | Won with par on fourth extra hole |

=== Other wins (2) ===
- 1993 Jerry Ford Invitational (tie with Donnie Hammond, and Jim Thorpe)
- 1999 Tartan Fields Celebrity Invitational with teammates Herb Williams and Jack Haley
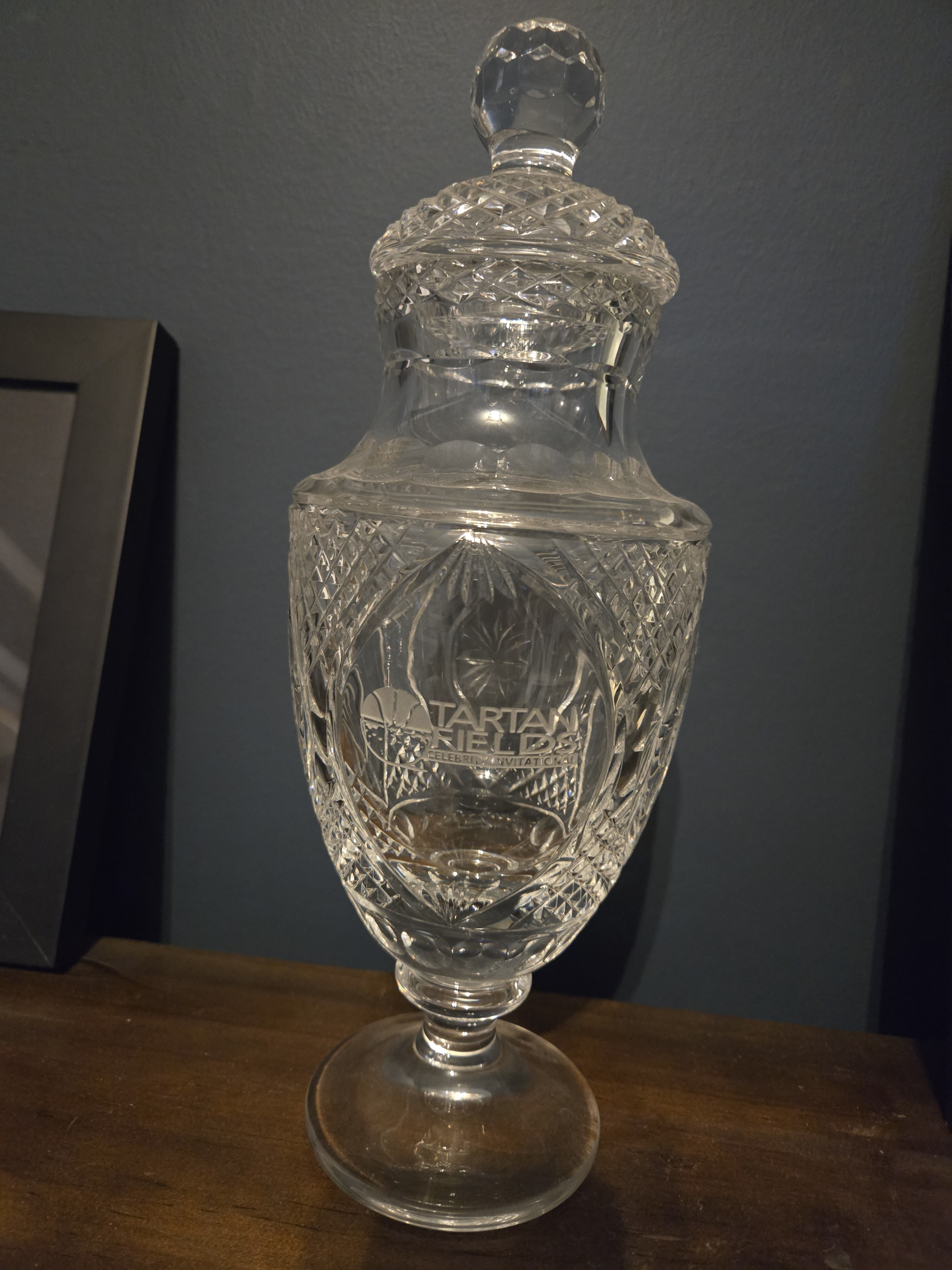
  1999 Tartan Fields Celebrity Invitational Championship Trophy. Won by PGA professional Jay Delsing, with teammates Jack Haley and Herb Williams

== Results in major championships ==
| Tournament | 1990 | 1991 | 1992 | 1993 | 1994 | 1995 | 1996 | 1997 | 1998 | 1999 | 2000 | 2001 | 2002 | 2003 | 2004 | 2005 | 2006 |
|---|---|---|---|---|---|---|---|---|---|---|---|---|---|---|---|---|---|
| U.S. Open | | CUT | T33 | | | | | | | | | | | | | | CUT |
| The Open Championship | | | | | | T88 | | | | | | | | | | | |
| PGA Championship | T63 | CUT | | CUT | | | | | | | | | | | | | |

Note: Delsing never played in the Masters Tournament.

== See also ==
- 1984 PGA Tour Qualifying School graduates
- 1987 PGA Tour Qualifying School graduates
- 1988 PGA Tour Qualifying School graduates
- 1989 PGA Tour Qualifying School graduates
- 1996 PGA Tour Qualifying School graduates
- 1998 PGA Tour Qualifying School graduates
- 2003 PGA Tour Qualifying School graduates
