= Bob Lohr =

American golfer

Personal information
- Full name: Robert Harold Lohr
- Nationality: United States
- Born: November 2, 1960 (age 65) Cincinnati, Ohio, U.S.
- Height: 6 ft 1 in (1.85 m)
- Weight: 185 lb (84 kg; 13.2 st)

Career
- Sport: Golf
- College: Miami University
- Turned professional: 1983
- Former tour: PGA Tour
- Professional wins: 3
- Highest ranking: 75 (January 29, 1989)

Number of wins by tour
- PGA Tour: 1
- Other: 2

Best results in major championships
- Masters Tournament: T46: 1989
- PGA Championship: T41: 1989
- U.S. Open: T33: 1990
- The Open Championship: T79: 1995

Robert Harold Lohr (born November 2, 1960) is an American professional golfer who has played on the PGA Tour and the Nationwide Tour.

== Early life and amateur career ==
In 1960, Lohr was born in Cincinnati, Ohio. He was raised in Milford, Ohio. He attended Miami University in Oxford, Ohio and was a member of the golf team; he won All-American honors (honorable mention) in his senior year, and All-MAC honors in his last three years.

== Professional career ==
In 1983, Lohr turned professional. He moved to Loveland, Ohio during this era.

Lohr played on the PGA Tour from 1985 to 1996. He finished in a tie for first place at the end of regulation in three PGA Tour events. In the 1988 Walt Disney World/Oldsmobile Classic, he defeated Chip Beck on the fifth hole of a playoff. In 1993 at the H-E-B Texas Open, he lost in a playoff to Jay Haas. In 1995 at the Bell Canadian Open, Lohr lost in a playoff to Mark O'Meara. He also finished runner-up in four other events.

Lohr's best finish in a major was T-33 in the 1990 U.S. Open.

During his late 30s and 40s, Lohr played some on the Nationwide Tour. He was inducted into the Miami University Athletics Hall of Fame in 1993.

== Personal life ==
Lohr lives in the greater Orlando, Florida area.

== Awards and honors ==
- While at Miami University, Lohr earned All-MAC honors as a sophomore, junior, and senior.
- As a senior, he earned All-American honors (honorable mention).
- In 1993, Lohr was inducted into the Miami University Athletics Hall of Fame.

== Professional wins (3) ==
=== PGA Tour wins (1) ===
No.	Date	Tournament	Winning score	Margin of victory	Runner-up
1	Oct 29, 1988	Walt Disney World/Oldsmobile Classic	−25 (62-67-66-68=263)	Playoff	(United States) Chip Beck

PGA Tour playoff record (1–2)

No.	Year	Tournament	Opponent	Result
1	1988	Walt Disney World/Oldsmobile Classic	(United States) Chip Beck	Won with par on fifth extra hole
2	1993	H.E.B. Texas Open	(United States) Jay Haas	Lost to birdie on second extra hole
3	1995	Bell Canadian Open	(United States) Mark O'Meara	Lost to par on first extra hole

=== Other wins (2) ===
- 1987 Peru Open
- 1990 Mexican Open

== Results in major championships ==
Tournament	1985	1986	1987	1988	1989	1990	1991	1992	1993	1994	1995	1996
Masters Tournament					T46							
U.S. Open		CUT	T58	CUT		T33						
The Open Championship											T79	
PGA Championship	CUT	CUT	CUT	CUT	T41	CUT	CUT	CUT	CUT	CUT		CUT

Did not play

CUT = missed the half-way cut
"T" = tied

== See also ==
- 1984 PGA Tour Qualifying School graduates
