= 1984 PGA Tour =

Golf tour season

1984 PGA Tour season
- Duration: January 5, 1984 – October 30, 1984
- Number of official events: 43
- Most wins: (Zimbabwe) Denis Watson (3) (United States) Tom Watson (3)
- Money list: (United States) Tom Watson
- PGA Player of the Year: (United States) Tom Watson
- Rookie of the Year: (United States) Corey Pavin

The 1984 PGA Tour was the 69th season of the PGA Tour, the main professional golf tour in the United States. It was also the 16th season since separating from the PGA of America.

== Schedule ==
The following table lists official events during the 1984 season.

Date	Tournament	Location	Purse (US$)	Winner (Note: The number in parentheses after each winner's name is the number of PGA Tour events they had won up to and including that tournament. This information is only shown for PGA Tour members.)	Notes
Jan 8	Seiko-Tucson Match Play Championship	Arizona	708,000	(United States) Tom Watson (34)	
Jan 15	Bob Hope Classic	California	400,000	(United States) John Mahaffey (7)	Pro-Am
Jan 22	Phoenix Open	Arizona	400,000	(United States) Tom Purtzer (2)	
Jan 29	Isuzu-Andy Williams San Diego Open	California	400,000	(United States) Gary Koch (4)	
Feb 5	Bing Crosby National Pro-Am	California	400,000	(United States) Hale Irwin (16)	Pro-Am
Feb 12	Hawaiian Open	Hawaii	500,000	(United States) Jack Renner (3)	
Feb 19	Los Angeles Open	California	400,000	(United States) David Edwards (2)	
Mar 4	Honda Classic	Florida	500,000	(United States) Bruce Lietzke (10)	
Mar 11	Doral-Eastern Open	Florida	400,000	(United States) Tom Kite (6)	
Mar 18	Bay Hill Classic	Florida	400,000	(United States) Gary Koch (5)	
Mar 25	USF&G Classic	Louisiana	400,000	(United States) Bob Eastwood (1)	
Apr 1	Tournament Players Championship	Florida	800,000	(United States) Fred Couples (2)	Special event
Apr 8	Greater Greensboro Open	North Carolina	400,000	(United States) Andy Bean (9)	
Apr 15	Masters Tournament	Georgia	600,000	(United States) Ben Crenshaw (10)	Major championship
Apr 22	Sea Pines Heritage	South Carolina	400,000	(England) Nick Faldo (1)	Invitational
Apr 29	Houston Coca-Cola Open	Texas	500,000	(United States) Corey Pavin (1)	
May 6	MONY Tournament of Champions	California	400,000	(United States) Tom Watson (35)	Winners-only event
May 13	Byron Nelson Golf Classic	Texas	500,000	(United States) Craig Stadler (8)	
May 20	Colonial National Invitation	Texas	500,000	(United States) Peter Jacobsen (2)	Invitational
May 27	Memorial Tournament	Ohio	565,500	(United States) Jack Nicklaus (72)	Invitational
Jun 3	Kemper Open	Maryland	400,000	(Australia) Greg Norman (1)	
Jun 10	Manufacturers Hanover Westchester Classic	New York	500,000	(United States) Scott Simpson (2)	
Jun 18	U.S. Open	New York	600,000	(United States) Fuzzy Zoeller (6)	Major championship
Jun 24	Georgia-Pacific Atlanta Golf Classic	Georgia	400,000	(United States) Tom Kite (7)	
Jul 1	Canadian Open	Canada	525,000	(Australia) Greg Norman (2)	
Jul 8	Western Open	Illinois	400,000	(United States) Tom Watson (36)	
Jul 15	Anheuser-Busch Golf Classic	Virginia	350,000	(United States) Ronnie Black (2)	
Jul 22	Miller High Life QCO	Illinois	200,000	(United States) Scott Hoch (3)	
Jul 22	The Open Championship	Scotland	£425,000	(Spain) Seve Ballesteros (6)	Major championship (Note: Unofficial money event at the time, but retrospectively counted as an official win.)
Jul 29	Sammy Davis Jr.-Greater Hartford Open	Connecticut	400,000	(United States) Peter Jacobsen (3)	
Aug 5	Danny Thomas Memphis Classic	Tennessee	500,000	(United States) Bob Eastwood (2)	
Aug 12	Buick Open	Michigan	400,000	(Zimbabwe) Denis Watson (1)	
Aug 19	PGA Championship	Alabama	700,000	(United States) Lee Trevino (29)	Major championship
Aug 26	NEC World Series of Golf	Ohio	700,000	(Zimbabwe) Denis Watson (2)	Limited-field event
Sep 2	B.C. Open	New York	300,000	(United States) Wayne Levi (7)	
Sep 9	Bank of Boston Classic	Massachusetts	350,000	(United States) George Archer (13)	
Sep 16	Greater Milwaukee Open	Wisconsin	300,000	(United States) Mark O'Meara (1)	
Sep 23	Panasonic Las Vegas Invitational	Nevada	1,122,500	(Zimbabwe) Denis Watson (3)	
Sep 30	LaJet Golf Classic	Texas	350,000	(United States) Curtis Strange (5)	
Oct 7	Texas Open	Texas	350,000	(United States) Calvin Peete (8)	
Oct 14	Southern Open	Georgia	300,000	(United States) Hubert Green (18)	
Oct 21	Walt Disney World Golf Classic	Florida	400,000	(United States) Larry Nelson (7)	
Oct 28	Pensacola Open	Florida	300,000	(United States) Billy Kratzert (4)	

=== Unofficial events ===
The following events were sanctioned by the PGA Tour, but did not carry official money, nor were wins official.

Date	Tournament	Location	Purse ($)	Winner(s)	Notes
Nov 11	Kapalua International	Hawaii	450,000	(Scotland) Sandy Lyle	
Nov 18	World Cup	Italy	150,000	(Spain) José María Cañizares and (Spain) José Rivero	Team event
Nov 18	World Cup Individual Trophy	Italy	150,000	(Spain) José María Cañizares	
Nov 25	Skins Game	Arizona	360,000	(United States) Jack Nicklaus	Limited-field event
Dec 9	JCPenney Mixed Team Classic	Florida	550,000	(United States) Vicki Alvarez and (United States) Mike Donald	Team event
Dec 16	Chrysler Team Championship	Florida	400,000	(United States) Phil Hancock and (United States) Ron Streck	Team event

== Money list ==
The money list was based on prize money won during the season, calculated in U.S. dollars.

Position	Player	Prize money ($)
1	(United States) Tom Watson	476,260
2	(United States) Mark O'Meara	465,873
3	(United States) Andy Bean	422,995
4	(Zimbabwe) Denis Watson	408,562
5	(United States) Tom Kite	348,640
6	(United States) Bruce Lietzke	342,853
7	(United States) Fred Couples	334,573
8	(United States) Craig Stadler	324,241
9	(Australia) Greg Norman	310,230
10	(United States) Peter Jacobsen	295,025

== Awards ==
Award	Winner	Ref.
PGA Player of the Year	(United States) Tom Watson	
Rookie of the Year	(United States) Corey Pavin	
Scoring leader (PGA Tour – Byron Nelson Award)	(United States) Calvin Peete	
Scoring leader (PGA – Vardon Trophy)	(United States) Calvin Peete	

== See also ==
- 1984 Senior PGA Tour
