= 1989 Players Championship =

Tournament information
- Dates: March 16–19, 1989
- Location: Ponte Vedra Beach, Florida; 30.198°N 81.394°W
- Courses: TPC Sawgrass, Stadium Course
- Tour: PGA Tour

Statistics
- Par: 72
- Length: 6,857 yards (6,270 m)
- Field: 144 players, 74 after cut
- Cut: 146 (+2)
- Prize fund: $1.35 million
- Winner's share: $243,000

Champion
- (United States) Tom Kite
- 279 (−9)

Location map
- Location in the United States Location in Florida

The 1989 Players Championship was a golf tournament in Florida on the PGA Tour, held March 16–19 at TPC Sawgrass in Ponte Vedra Beach, southeast of Jacksonville. It was the sixteenth Players Championship.

In gusty conditions, Tom Kite won the title at 279 (−9), one stroke ahead of runner-up Chip Beck.

Defending champion Mark McCumber finished four strokes back, in a tie for sixth place.

== Venue ==
This was the eighth Players Championship held at the TPC at Sawgrass Stadium Course and it remained at 6,857 yards (6,270 m).

== Field ==
Fulton Allem, Isao Aoki, George Archer, Tommy Armour III, Paul Azinger, Ian Baker-Finch, Dave Barr, Andy Bean, Chip Beck, Jim Benepe, Ronnie Black, Phil Blackmar, Jay Don Blake, Bill Britton, Mark Brooks, Billy Ray Brown, Brad Bryant, Curt Byrum, Tom Byrum, Mark Calcavecchia, Rex Caldwell, David Canipe, Jim Carter, Chen Tze-chung, Bobby Clampett, Keith Clearwater, Lennie Clements, Russ Cochran, John Cook, Fred Couples, Ben Crenshaw, Mike Donald, Bob Eastwood, David Edwards, Dave Eichelberger, Steve Elkington, Brad Fabel, Brad Faxon, Ed Fiori, Raymond Floyd, Dan Forsman, David Frost, Jim Gallagher Jr., Buddy Gardner, Bob Gilder, Bill Glasson, Wayne Grady, David Graham, Hubert Green, Ken Green, Jay Haas, Gary Hallberg, Dan Halldorson, Jim Hallet, Donnie Hammond, Morris Hatalsky, Mark Hayes, Lon Hinkle, Scott Hoch, Mike Hulbert, John Huston, Hale Irwin, Peter Jacobsen, Steve Jones, Tom Kite, Kenny Knox, Gary Koch, Bernhard Langer, Wayne Levi, Bruce Lietzke, Bob Lohr, Davis Love III, Mark Lye, Sandy Lyle, Andrew Magee, John Mahaffey, Roger Maltbie, Dick Mast, Billy Mayfair, Blaine McCallister, John McComish, Mark McCumber, Rocco Mediate, Johnny Miller, Larry Mize, Gil Morgan, Jodie Mudd, Tsuneyuki Nakajima, Larry Nelson, Jack Nicklaus, Greg Norman, Tim Norris, Andy North, Mark O'Meara, David Ogrin, Masashi Ozaki, Jerry Pate, Steve Pate, Corey Pavin, Calvin Peete, Chris Perry, Kenny Perry, Dan Pohl, Don Pooley, Nick Price, Tom Purtzer, Sam Randolph, Don Reese, Mike Reid, Larry Rinker, Loren Roberts, Bill Rogers, Clarence Rose, Dave Rummells, Bill Sander, Gene Sauers, Ted Schulz, Tom Sieckmann, Scott Simpson, Tim Simpson, Joey Sindelar, Jeff Sluman, J. C. Snead, Craig Stadler, Payne Stewart, Curtis Strange, Mike Sullivan, Hal Sutton, Brian Tennyson, Doug Tewell, Leonard Thompson, Bob Tway, Greg Twiggs, Howard Twitty, Scott Verplank, Bobby Wadkins, Lanny Wadkins, Denis Watson, Tom Watson, D. A. Weibring, Mark Wiebe, Robert Wrenn, Fuzzy Zoeller, Richard Zokol

== Round summaries ==
=== First round ===
Thursday, March 16, 1989

Place	Player	Score	To par
1	(United States) Keith Clearwater	65	−7
T2	(South Africa) David Frost	66	−6
T2	(United States) Bruce Lietzke	66	−6
T2	(United States) Steve Pate	66	−6
5	(United States) Ben Crenshaw	67	−5
T6	(United States) Paul Azinger	68	−4
T6	(United States) Andy Bean	68	−4
T6	(United States) Fred Couples	68	−4
T6	(Australia) David Graham	68	−4
T6	(United States) Mike Hulbert	68	−4
T6	(United States) Steve Jones	68	−4
T6	(United States) Mike Donald	68	−4
T6	(United States) Kenny Perry	68	−4
T6	(United States) Curtis Strange	68	−4

=== Second round ===
Friday, March 17, 1989

Place	Player	Score	To par
1	(United States) Bruce Lietzke	66-69=135	−9
2	(South Africa) David Frost	66-71=137	−7
3	(United States) Fred Couples	68-70=138	−6
T4	(South Africa) Fulton Allem	70-69=139	−5
T4	(United States) Paul Azinger	68-71=139	−5
T4	(United States) Chip Beck	71-68=139	−5
T4	(United States) Ben Crenshaw	67-72=139	−5
T4	(United States) Tom Kite	69-70=139	−5
T4	(United States) Gary Koch	70-69=139	−5
T4	(United States) Mark McCumber	69-70=139	−5
T4	(United States) Dan Pohl	69-70=139	−5

=== Third round ===
Saturday, March 18, 1989

Place	Player	Score	To par
1	(United States) Chip Beck	71-68-68=207	−9
2	(United States) Tom Kite	69-70-69=208	−8
T3	(United States) Fred Couples	68-70-71=209	−7
T3	(United States) Ben Crenshaw	67-72-70=209	−7
T3	(United States) Gary Koch	70-69-70=209	−7
T3	(United States) Bruce Lietzke	66-69-74=209	−7
T3	(United States) Mark McCumber	69-70-70=209	−7
T8	(United States) Gil Morgan	71-69-70=210	−6
T8	(Australia) Greg Norman	74-67-69=210	−6
T10	(United States) Jack Nicklaus	71-72-68=211	−5
T10	(United States) Craig Stadler	70-72-69=211	−5

=== Final round ===
Sunday, March 19, 1989

Champion
(c) = past champion

Place	Player	Score	To par	Money ($)
1	(United States) Tom Kite	69-70-69-71=279	−9	243,000
2	(United States) Chip Beck	71-68-68-73=280	−8	145,800
3	(United States) Bruce Lietzke	66-69-74-72=281	−7	91,800
T4	(United States) Fred Couples (c)	68-70-71-73=282	−6	59,400
T4	(Australia) Greg Norman	74-67-69-72=282	−6	59,400
T6	(United States) Mark McCumber (c)	69-70-70-74=283	−5	46,912
T6	(United States) Gil Morgan	71-69-70-73=283	−5	46,912
T8	(United States) Andy Bean	68-76-69-71=284	−4	39,150
T8	(South Africa) David Frost	66-71-75-72=284	−4	39,150
T8	(United States) Gary Koch	70-69-70-75=284	−4	39,150

Leaderboard below the top 10
Place	Player	Score	To par	Money ($)
T11	(United States) Ben Crenshaw	67-72-70-76=285	−3	31,050
T11	(United States) Rocco Mediate	73-71-69-72=285	−3	31,050
T11	(United States) Tom Watson	71-73-71-70=285	−3	31,050
T14	(South Africa) Fulton Allem	70-69-75-72=286	−2	24,300
T14	(United States) Paul Azinger	68-71-74-73=286	−2	24,300
T14	(United States) Loren Roberts	72-73-69-72=286	−2	24,300
T17	(United States) Brad Faxon	72-71-69-75=287	−1	19,575
T17	(United States) Tim Simpson	70-71-71-75=287	−1	19,575
T17	(United States) Mike Sullivan	72-71-70-74=287	−1	19,575
T17	(United States) Mark Wiebe	74-71-71-71=287	−1	19,575
T21	(United States) Mike Donald	68-72-73-75=288	E	12,673
T21	(United States) David Edwards	71-73-69-75=288	E	12,673
T21	(United States) Ken Green	70-71-73-74=288	E	12,673
T21	(United States) Chris Perry	70-75-70-73=288	E	12,673
T21	(United States) Kenny Perry	68-77-72-71=288	E	12,673
T21	(United States) Larry Rinker	71-72-72-73=288	E	12,673
T21	(United States) Craig Stadler	70-72-69-77=288	E	12,673
T21	(United States) D. A. Weibring	70-74-72-72=288	E	12,673
T29	(United States) Jack Nicklaus (c)	71-72-68-78=289	+1	8,775
T29	(United States) Mike Reid	73-71-71-74=289	+1	8,775
T29	(United States) Ted Schulz	73-72-73-71=289	+1	8,775
T29	(United States) Hal Sutton (c)	71-71-78-69=289	+1	8,775
T29	(United States) Bob Tway	69-73-72-75=289	+1	8,775
T34	(United States) Jim Gallagher Jr.	70-72-74-74=290	+2	6,672
T34	(United States) Bob Gilder	73-71-73-73=290	+2	6,672
T34	(United States) Steve Pate	66-78-71-75=290	+2	6,672
T34	(United States) Corey Pavin	70-70-77-73=290	+2	6,672
T34	(United States) Joey Sindelar	72-73-68-77=290	+2	6,672
T34	(United States) Curtis Strange	68-76-72-74=290	+2	6,672
T34	(United States) Doug Tewell	70-75-72-73=290	+2	6,672
T41	(United States) Keith Clearwater	65-76-74-76=291	+3	5,130
T41	(United States) Steve Jones	68-75-73-75=291	+3	5,130
T41	(United States) Roger Maltbie	75-71-71-74=291	+3	5,130
T41	(United States) Lanny Wadkins (c)	73-73-71-74=291	+3	5,130
T45	(United States) Jim Carter	74-70-73-75=292	+4	3,952
T45	(United States) John Mahaffey (c)	73-73-73-73=292	+4	3,952
T45	(United States) David Ogrin	72-74-74-72=292	+4	3,952
T45	(Japan) Masashi Ozaki	75-68-70-79=292	+4	3,952
T45	(United States) Fuzzy Zoeller	74-72-71-75=292	+4	3,952
T50	(United States) Gary Hallberg	74-72-71-76=293	+5	3,256
T50	(United States) Wayne Levi	75-71-68-79=293	+5	3,256
T50	(United States) Dan Pohl	69-70-75-79=293	+5	3,256
T50	(United States) Clarence Rose	72-71-75-75=293	+5	3,256
T50	(Canada) Richard Zokol	71-74-72-76=293	+5	3,256
T55	(United States) Mark Hayes (c)	70-76-74-74=294	+6	3,064
T55	(United States) Kenny Knox	72-74-71-77=294	+6	3,064
T55	(United States) Tom Purtzer	71-74-76-73=294	+6	3,064
T55	(United States) Gene Sauers	74-72-72-76=294	+6	3,064
T59	(United States) Billy Ray Brown	72-72-74-77=295	+7	2,902
T59	(United States) Brad Bryant	74-71-76-74=295	+7	2,902
T59	(United States) Ed Fiori	74-70-81-70=295	+7	2,902
T59	(Canada) Dan Halldorson	73-72-75-75=295	+7	2,902
T59	(United States) Mike Hulbert	68-74-79-74=295	+7	2,902
T59	(United States) Bob Lohr	71-73-75-76=295	+7	2,902
T59	(United States) Larry Nelson	70-75-72-78=295	+7	2,902
T59	(United States) Greg Twiggs	74-71-77-73=295	+7	2,902
T67	(United States) Tom Byrum	72-72-74-78=296	+8	2,754
T67	(West Germany) Bernhard Langer	72-74-76-74=296	+8	2,754
T67	(United States) John McComish	75-70-74-77=296	+8	2,754
T70	(United States) Peter Jacobsen	70-75-74-78=297	+9	2,686
T70	(United States) Larry Mize	72-71-76-78=297	+9	2,686
72	(Australia) David Graham	68-77-78-75=298	+10	2,646
73	(Canada) Dave Barr	72-69-79-79=299	+11	2,619
74	(United States) Bill Britton	71-74-76-80=301	+13	2,592
CUT	(United States) Jay Don Blake	71-76=147	+3	
CUT	(United States) Curt Byrum	72-75=147	+3	
CUT	(United States) Mark Calcavecchia	74-73=147	+3	
CUT	(United States) Lennie Clements	74-73=147	+3	
CUT	(Australia) Wayne Grady	72-75=147	+3	
CUT	(United States) Hale Irwin	74-73=147	+3	
CUT	(United States) Andrew Magee	73-74=147	+3	
CUT	(United States) Billy Mayfair	72-75=147	+3	
CUT	(United States) Blaine McCallister	76-71=147	+3	
CUT	(Zimbabwe) Nick Price	73-74=147	+3	
CUT	(United States) Don Reese	70-77=147	+3	
CUT	(United States) Robert Wrenn	72-75=147	+3	
CUT	(Japan) Isao Aoki	73-75=148	+4	
CUT	(United States) Ronnie Black	74-74=148	+4	
CUT	(United States) David Canipe	72-76=148	+4	
CUT	(Taiwan) Chen Tze-chung	74-74=148	+4	
CUT	(United States) Buddy Gardner	73-75=148	+4	
CUT	(United States) Jay Haas	76-72=148	+4	
CUT	(United States) Donnie Hammond	78-70=148	+4	
CUT	(United States) Scott Hoch	74-74=148	+4	
CUT	(United States) John Huston	70-78=148	+4	
CUT	(United States) Mark Lye	71-77=148	+4	
CUT	(Scotland) Sandy Lyle (c)	75-73=148	+4	
CUT	(United States) Tom Sieckmann	73-75=148	+4	
CUT	(United States) Scott Simpson	75-73=148	+4	
CUT	(United States) J. C. Snead	73-75=148	+4	
CUT	(United States) Payne Stewart	70-78=148	+4	
CUT	(United States) Leonard Thompson	71-77=148	+4	
CUT	(Australia) Ian Baker-Finch	74-75=149	+5	
CUT	(United States) Bobby Clampett	73-76=149	+5	
CUT	(United States) John Cook	72-77=149	+5	
CUT	(United States) Bob Eastwood	76-73=149	+5	
CUT	(United States) Lon Hinkle	74-75=149	+5	
CUT	(United States) Davis Love III	74-75=149	+5	
CUT	(United States) Don Pooley	70-79=149	+5	
CUT	(United States) Mark Brooks	75-75=150	+6	
CUT	(United States) Johnny Miller	76-74=150	+6	
CUT	(United States) Mark O'Meara	72-78=150	+6	
CUT	(United States) Dave Rummells	74-76=150	+6	
CUT	(United States) Tommy Armour III	79-72=151	+7	
CUT	(United States) Rex Caldwell	78-73=151	+7	
CUT	(Australia) Steve Elkington	77-74=151	+7	
CUT	(United States) Dan Forsman	73-78=151	+7	
CUT	(United States) Hubert Green	77-74=151	+7	
CUT	(United States) Jim Hallet	78-73=151	+7	
CUT	(United States) Morris Hatalsky	77-74=151	+7	
CUT	(United States) Andy North	73-78=151	+7	
CUT	(United States) Sam Randolph	74-77=151	+7	
CUT	(United States) Jim Benepe	78-74=152	+8	
CUT	(United States) Russ Cochran	78-74=152	+8	
CUT	(United States) Brad Fabel	81-71=152	+8	
CUT	(United States) Raymond Floyd (c)	72-80=152	+8	
CUT	(United States) Jerry Pate (c)	77-75=152	+8	
CUT	(United States) Calvin Peete (c)	81-72=153	+9	
CUT	(United States) Bill Sander	78-75=153	+9	
CUT	(United States) Jeff Sluman	73-80=153	+9	
CUT	(United States) Brian Tennyson	75-78=153	+9	
CUT	(United States) Bobby Wadkins	75-78=153	+9	
CUT	(United States) Phil Blackmar	73-81=154	+10	
CUT	(United States) Dave Eichelberger	80-74=154	+10	
CUT	(United States) Jodie Mudd	73-81=154	+10	
CUT	(Japan) Tsuneyuki Nakajima	79-75=154	+10	
CUT	(United States) Tim Norris	80-75=155	+11	
CUT	(United States) Howard Twitty	76-80=156	+12	
CUT	(United States) Scott Verplank	73-83=156	+12	
CUT	(Zimbabwe) Denis Watson	80-76=156	+12	
CUT	(United States) Dick Mast	79-78=157	+13	
CUT	(United States) George Archer	81-78=159	+15	
WD	(United States) Bill Glasson	76	+4	
DQ	(United States) Bill Rogers			
