= 1989 PGA Tour =

Golf tour season

1989 PGA Tour season
- Duration: January 5, 1989 – October 29, 1989
- Number of official events: 44
- Most wins: (United States) Mark Calcavecchia (3) (United States) Steve Jones (3) (United States) Tom Kite (3)
- Money list: (United States) Tom Kite
- PGA Player of the Year: (United States) Tom Kite
- Rookie of the Year: (United States) Bob Estes

The 1989 PGA Tour was the 74th season of the PGA Tour, the main professional golf tour in the United States. It was also the 21st season since separating from the PGA of America.

== Schedule ==
The following table lists official events during the 1989 season.

| Date | Tournament | Location | Purse (US$) | Winner (Note: The number in parentheses after each winner's name is the number of PGA Tour events they had won up to and including that tournament. This information is only shown for PGA Tour members.) | OWGR points | Notes |
|---|---|---|---|---|---|---|
| Jan 8 | MONY Tournament of Champions | California | 750,000 | (United States) Steve Jones (2) | 54 | Winners-only event |
| Jan 15 | Bob Hope Chrysler Classic | California | 1,000,000 | (United States) Steve Jones (3) | 46 | Pro-Am |
| Jan 22 | Phoenix Open | Arizona | 700,000 | (United States) Mark Calcavecchia (4) | 56 | |
| Jan 29 | AT&T Pebble Beach National Pro-Am | California | 1,000,000 | (United States) Mark O'Meara (4) | 52 | Pro-Am |
| Feb 5 | Nissan Los Angeles Open | California | 1,000,000 | (United States) Mark Calcavecchia (5) | 58 | |
| Feb 12 | Hawaiian Open | Hawaii | 750,000 | (United States) Gene Sauers (2) | 32 | |
| Feb 19 | Shearson Lehman Hutton Open | California | 700,000 | (United States) Greg Twiggs (1) | 38 | |
| Feb 26 | Doral-Ryder Open | Florida | 1,300,000 | (United States) Bill Glasson (4) | 64 | |
| Mar 5 | Honda Classic | Florida | 800,000 | (United States) Blaine McCallister (2) | 56 | |
| Mar 12 | Nestle Invitational | Florida | 800,000 | (United States) Tom Kite (11) | 68 | Invitational |
| Mar 19 | The Players Championship | Florida | 1,350,000 | (United States) Tom Kite (12) | 80 | Flagship event |
| Mar 26 | USF&G Classic | Louisiana | 750,000 | (United States) Tim Simpson (2) | 50 | |
| Apr 2 | Independent Insurance Agent Open | Texas | 800,000 | (United States) Mike Sullivan (2) | 50 | |
| Apr 9 | Masters Tournament | Georgia | 1,000,000 | (England) Nick Faldo (3) | 100 | Major championship |
| Apr 9 | Deposit Guaranty Golf Classic | Mississippi | 200,000 | (United States) Jim Booros (n/a) | 6 | Alternate event (Note: Official money; unofficial win.) |
| Apr 16 | MCI Heritage Golf Classic | South Carolina | 800,000 | (United States) Payne Stewart (4) | 62 | Invitational |
| Apr 23 | KMart Greater Greensboro Open | North Carolina | 1,000,000 | (United States) Ken Green (5) | 50 | |
| Apr 30 | Las Vegas Invitational | Nevada | 1,300,000 | (United States) Scott Hoch (4) | 36 | |
| May 7 | GTE Byron Nelson Golf Classic | Texas | 1,000,000 | (United States) Jodie Mudd (2) | 50 | |
| May 14 | Memorial Tournament | Ohio | 1,000,000 | (United States) Bob Tway (5) | 70 | Invitational |
| May 21 | Southwestern Bell Colonial | Texas | 1,000,000 | (Australia) Ian Baker-Finch (1) | 54 | Invitational |
| May 28 | BellSouth Atlanta Golf Classic | Georgia | 900,000 | (United States) Scott Simpson (5) | 40 | |
| Jun 4 | Kemper Open | Maryland | 900,000 | (United States) Tom Byrum (1) | 38 | |
| Jun 11 | Manufacturers Hanover Westchester Classic | New York | 1,000,000 | (Australia) Wayne Grady (1) | 60 | |
| Jun 18 | U.S. Open | New York | 1,000,000 | (United States) Curtis Strange (17) | 100 | Major championship |
| Jun 25 | Canadian Open | Canada | 900,000 | (United States) Steve Jones (4) | 48 | |
| Jul 3 | Beatrice Western Open | Illinois | 1,000,000 | (United States) Mark McCumber (7) | 50 | |
| Jul 9 | Canon Greater Hartford Open | Connecticut | 1,000,000 | (United States) Paul Azinger (5) | 38 | |
| Jul 16 | Anheuser-Busch Golf Classic | Virginia | 850,000 | (United States) Mike Donald (1) | 36 | |
| Jul 23 | Hardee's Golf Classic | Illinois | 700,000 | (United States) Curt Byrum (1) | 16 | |
| Jul 23 | The Open Championship | Scotland | £725,000 | (United States) Mark Calcavecchia (6) | 100 | Major championship (Note: Unofficial money event at the time, but retrospectively counted as an official win.) |
| Jul 30 | Buick Open | Michigan | 1,000,000 | (United States) Leonard Thompson (3) | 38 | |
| Aug 6 | Federal Express St. Jude Classic | Tennessee | 1,000,000 | (United States) John Mahaffey (10) | 36 | |
| Aug 13 | PGA Championship | Illinois | 1,200,000 | (United States) Payne Stewart (5) | 100 | Major championship |
| Aug 20 | The International | Colorado | 1,000,000 | (Australia) Greg Norman (7) | 46 | |
| Aug 27 | NEC World Series of Golf | Ohio | 1,000,000 | (South Africa) David Frost (3) | 68 | Limited-field event |
| Aug 27 | Chattanooga Classic | Tennessee | 500,000 | (United States) Stan Utley (1) | 8 | Alternate event |
| Sep 3 | Greater Milwaukee Open | Wisconsin | 800,000 | (Australia) Greg Norman (8) | 34 | |
| Sep 10 | B.C. Open | New York | 500,000 | (United States) Mike Hulbert (2) | 18 | |
| Sep 17 | Bank of Boston Classic | Massachusetts | 700,000 | (United States) Blaine McCallister (3) | 40 | |
| Sep 24 | Southern Open | Georgia | 400,000 | (United States) Ted Schulz (1) | 18 | |
| Oct 1 | Centel Classic | Florida | 750,000 | (United States) Bill Britton (1) | 16 | |
| Oct 8 | Texas Open | Texas | 600,000 | (United States) Donnie Hammond (2) | 24 | |
| Oct 22 | Walt Disney World/Oldsmobile Classic | Florida | 800,000 | (United States) Tim Simpson (3) | 46 | |
| Oct 29 | Nabisco Championship | South Carolina | 2,500,000 | (United States) Tom Kite (13) | 54 | Tour Championship |

=== Unofficial events ===
The following events were sanctioned by the PGA Tour, but did not carry official money, nor were wins official.

| Date | Tournament | Location | Purse ($) | Winner(s) | OWGR points | Notes |
|---|---|---|---|---|---|---|
| May 29 | PGA Grand Slam of Golf | Illinois | n/a | (United States) Curtis Strange | n/a | Limited-field event |
| Sep 24 | Ryder Cup | England | n/a | Tied | n/a | Team event |
| Nov 11 | Isuzu Kapalua International | Hawaii | 650,000 | (United States) Peter Jacobsen | 16 | |
| Nov 19 | World Cup | Spain | 1,100,000 | (Australia) Peter Fowler and (Australia) Wayne Grady | n/a | Team event |
| Nov 19 | World Cup Individual Trophy | Spain | 1,100,000 | (Australia) Peter Fowler | n/a | |
| Nov 19 | RMCC Invitational | California | 1,000,000 | (United States) Mark O'Meara and (United States) Curtis Strange | n/a | New tournament Team event |
| Nov 26 | Skins Game | California | 450,000 | (United States) Curtis Strange | n/a | Limited-field event |
| Dec 3 | JCPenney Classic | Florida | 1,000,000 | (United States) Pat Bradley and (United States) Bill Glasson | n/a | Team event |
| Dec 10 | Chrysler Team Championship | Florida | 600,000 | (United States) David Ogrin and (United States) Ted Schulz | n/a | Team event |

== Money list ==
The money list was based on prize money won during the season, calculated in U.S. dollars.

| Position | Player | Prize money ($) |
|---|---|---|
| 1 | (United States) Tom Kite | 1,395,278 |
| 2 | (United States) Payne Stewart | 1,201,301 |
| 3 | (United States) Paul Azinger | 951,649 |
| 4 | (Australia) Greg Norman | 835,096 |
| 5 | (United States) Mark Calcavecchia | 807,741 |
| 6 | (United States) Tim Simpson | 761,597 |
| 7 | (United States) Curtis Strange | 752,587 |
| 8 | (United States) Steve Jones | 745,578 |
| 9 | (United States) Chip Beck | 694,087 |
| 10 | (United States) Scott Hoch | 670,680 |

== Awards ==
| Award | Winner | Ref. |
|---|---|---|
| PGA Player of the Year | (United States) Tom Kite | |
| Rookie of the Year | (United States) Bob Estes | |
| Scoring leader (PGA Tour – Byron Nelson Award) | (United States) Payne Stewart | |
| Scoring leader (PGA – Vardon Trophy) | (Australia) Greg Norman | |

== See also ==
- 1989 Senior PGA Tour
