= 1982 PGA Tour =

Golf tour season

1982 PGA Tour season
- Duration: January 7, 1982 – October 31, 1982
- Number of official events: 44
- Most wins: (United States) Calvin Peete (4) (United States) Craig Stadler (4) (United States) Tom Watson (4)
- Money list: (United States) Craig Stadler
- PGA Player of the Year: (United States) Tom Watson
- Rookie of the Year: (United States) Hal Sutton

The 1982 PGA Tour was the 67th season of the PGA Tour, the main professional golf tour in the United States. It was also the 14th season since separating from the PGA of America.

== Changes for 1982 ==
The season began as the TPA Tour, then reverted to the PGA Tour in mid-March. The "Tournament Players Association" name had been adopted less than seven months earlier, in late August 1981.

== Schedule ==
The following table lists official events during the 1982 season.

Date	Tournament	Location	Purse (US$)	Winner (Note: The number in parentheses after each winner's name is the number of PGA Tour events they had won up to and including that tournament. This information is only shown for PGA Tour members.)	Notes
Jan 10	Joe Garagiola-Tucson Open	Arizona	300,000	(United States) Craig Stadler (4)	
Jan 17	Bob Hope Desert Classic	California	250,000	(United States) Ed Fiori (3)	Pro-Am
Jan 25	Phoenix Open	Arizona	300,000	(United States) Lanny Wadkins (8)	
Jan 31	Wickes-Andy Williams San Diego Open	California	300,000	(United States) Johnny Miller (22)	
Feb 7	Bing Crosby National Pro-Am	California	300,000	(United States) Jim Simons (3)	Pro-Am
Feb 14	Hawaiian Open	Hawaii	325,000	(United States) Wayne Levi (4)	
Feb 21	Glen Campbell-Los Angeles Open	California	300,000	(United States) Tom Watson (29)	
Feb 28	Doral-Eastern Open	Florida	300,000	(United States) Andy Bean (8)	
Mar 7	Bay Hill Classic	Florida	300,000	(United States) Tom Kite (4)	
Mar 14	Honda Inverrary Classic	Florida	400,000	(United States) Hale Irwin (14)	
Mar 21	Tournament Players Championship	Florida	500,000	(United States) Jerry Pate (8)	Special event
Mar 28	Sea Pines Heritage	South Carolina	300,000	(United States) Tom Watson (30)	Invitational
Apr 5	Greater Greensboro Open	North Carolina	300,000	(United States) Danny Edwards (3)	
Apr 11	Masters Tournament	Georgia	365,000	(United States) Craig Stadler (5)	Major championship
Apr 11	Magnolia Classic	Mississippi	75,000	(United States) Payne Stewart (n/a)	Second Tour (Note: Official money; unofficial win.)
Apr 18	MONY Tournament of Champions	California	350,000	(United States) Lanny Wadkins (9)	Winners-only event
Apr 18	Tallahassee Open	Florida	100,000	(Australia) Bob Shearer (1)	Alternate event
Apr 25	USF&G Classic	Louisiana	300,000	(United States) Scott Hoch (2)	
May 2	Byron Nelson Golf Classic	Texas	350,000	(United States) Bob Gilder (3)	
May 9	Michelob-Houston Open	Texas	350,000	(United States) Ed Sneed (4)	
May 16	Colonial National Invitation	Texas	350,000	(United States) Jack Nicklaus (71)	Invitational
May 23	Georgia-Pacific Atlanta Golf Classic	Georgia	300,000	(United States) Keith Fergus (2)	
May 30	Memorial Tournament	Ohio	350,000	(United States) Raymond Floyd (16)	Invitational
Jun 6	Kemper Open	Maryland	400,000	(United States) Craig Stadler (6)	
Jun 13	Danny Thomas Memphis Classic	Tennessee	400,000	(United States) Raymond Floyd (17)	
Jun 20	U.S. Open	California	375,000	(United States) Tom Watson (31)	Major championship
Jun 27	Manufacturers Hanover Westchester Classic	New York	400,000	(United States) Bob Gilder (4)	
Jul 4	Western Open	Illinois	350,000	(United States) Tom Weiskopf (16)	
Jul 11	Greater Milwaukee Open	Wisconsin	250,000	(United States) Calvin Peete (2)	
Jul 18	The Open Championship	Scotland	£250,000	(United States) Tom Watson (32)	Major championship (Note: Unofficial money event at the time, but retrospectively counted as an official win.)
Jul 18	Miller High Life QCO	Illinois	200,000	(United States) Payne Stewart (1)	Alternate event
Jul 25	Anheuser-Busch Golf Classic	Virginia	350,000	(United States) Calvin Peete (3)	
Aug 1	Canadian Open	Canada	425,000	(United States) Bruce Lietzke (9)	
Aug 8	PGA Championship	Oklahoma	450,000	(United States) Raymond Floyd (18)	Major championship
Aug 15	Sammy Davis Jr.-Greater Hartford Open	Connecticut	300,000	(United States) Tim Norris (1)	
Aug 22	Buick Open	Michigan	350,000	(United States) Lanny Wadkins (10)	
Aug 29	World Series of Golf	Ohio	400,000	(United States) Craig Stadler (7)	Limited-field event
Sep 5	B.C. Open	New York	275,000	(United States) Calvin Peete (4)	
Sep 12	Bank of Boston Classic	Massachusetts	300,000	(United States) Bob Gilder (5)	
Sep 19	Hall of Fame	North Carolina	250,000	(United States) Jay Haas (4)	
Sep 26	Southern Open	Georgia	250,000	(United States) Bobby Clampett (1)	
Oct 3	Texas Open	Texas	250,000	(United States) Jay Haas (5)	
Oct 10	LaJet Classic	Texas	350,000	(United States) Wayne Levi (5)	
Oct 24	Pensacola Open	Florida	200,000	(United States) Calvin Peete (5)	
Oct 31	Walt Disney World Golf Classic	Florida	400,000	(United States) Hal Sutton (1)	

=== Unofficial events ===
The following events were sanctioned by the PGA Tour, but did not carry official money, nor were wins official.

Date	Tournament	Location	Purse ($)	Winner(s)	Notes
Nov 13	Kapalua Open	Hawaii	110,000	(United States) David Ishii	New tournament
Dec 5	World Cup	Mexico	n/a	(Spain) José María Cañizares and (Spain) Manuel Piñero	Team event
Dec 5	World Cup Individual Trophy	Mexico	n/a	(Spain) Manuel Piñero	
Dec 31	JCPenney Mixed Team Classic	Florida	550,000	(United States) JoAnne Carner and (United States) John Mahaffey	Team event

== Money list ==
The money list was based on prize money won during the season, calculated in U.S. dollars.

Position	Player	Prize money ($)
1	(United States) Craig Stadler	446,462
2	(United States) Raymond Floyd	386,809
3	(United States) Tom Kite	341,081
4	(United States) Calvin Peete	318,470
5	(United States) Tom Watson	316,483
6	(United States) Bob Gilder	308,648
7	(United States) Lanny Wadkins	306,827
8	(United States) Wayne Levi	280,681
9	(United States) Jerry Pate	280,141
10	(United States) Curtis Strange	263,378

== Awards ==
Award	Winner	Ref.
PGA Player of the Year	(United States) Tom Watson	
Rookie of the Year	(United States) Hal Sutton	
Scoring leader (PGA Tour - Byron Nelson Award)	(United States) Tom Kite	
Scoring leader (PGA - Vardon Trophy)	(United States) Tom Kite	

== See also ==
- 1982 Senior PGA Tour
