= 1981 PGA Tour =

Golf tour season

1981 PGA Tour season
- Duration: January 8, 1981 – October 25, 1981
- Number of official events: 44
- Most wins: (United States) Bill Rogers (4)
- Money list: (United States) Tom Kite
- PGA Player of the Year: (United States) Bill Rogers
- Rookie of the Year: (United States) Mark O'Meara

The 1981 PGA Tour, titled as the 1981 TPA Tour, was the 66th season of the PGA Tour, the main professional golf tour in the United States. It was also the 13th season since separating from the PGA of America.

== Changes for 1981 ==
The tour changed its name to the TPA Tour in late August, for the "Tournament Players Association". After less than seven months, it reverted to the PGA Tour in mid-March 1982.

== Schedule ==
The following table lists official events during the 1981 season.

Date	Tournament	Location	Purse (US$)	Winner(s) (Note: The number in parentheses after each winner's name is the number of PGA Tour events they had won up to and including that tournament. This information is only shown for PGA Tour members.)	Notes
Jan 11	Joe Garagiola-Tucson Open	Arizona	300,000	(United States) Johnny Miller (20)	
Jan 18	Bob Hope Desert Classic	California	250,000	(United States) Bruce Lietzke (6)	Pro-Am
Jan 25	Phoenix Open	Arizona	300,000	(Australia) David Graham (6)	
Feb 2	Bing Crosby National Pro-Am	California	225,000	(United States) John Cook (1)	Pro-Am
Feb 8	Wickes-Andy Williams San Diego Open	California	250,000	(United States) Bruce Lietzke (7)	
Feb 14	Hawaiian Open	Hawaii	325,000	(United States) Hale Irwin (12)	
Feb 22	Glen Campbell-Los Angeles Open	California	300,000	(United States) Johnny Miller (21)	
Mar 1	Bay Hill Classic	Florida	300,000	(United States) Andy Bean (7)	
Mar 8	American Motors Inverrary Classic	Florida	300,000	(United States) Tom Kite (3)	
Mar 15	Doral-Eastern Open	Florida	250,000	(United States) Raymond Floyd (13)	
Mar 23	Tournament Players Championship	Florida	400,000	(United States) Raymond Floyd (14)	Special event
Mar 29	Sea Pines Heritage	South Carolina	300,000	(United States) Bill Rogers (2)	Invitational
Apr 5	Greater Greensboro Open	North Carolina	300,000	(United States) Larry Nelson (4)	
Apr 12	Masters Tournament	Georgia	365,000	(United States) Tom Watson (26)	Major championship
Apr 12	Magnolia Classic	Mississippi	75,000	(United States) Tom Jones (n/a)	Second Tour (Note: Official money; unofficial win.)
Apr 19	MONY Tournament of Champions	California	300,000	(United States) Lee Trevino (28)	Winners-only event
Apr 19	Tallahassee Open	Florida	100,000	(United States) Dave Eichelberger (4)	Alternate event
Apr 26	USF&G New Orleans Open	Louisiana	350,000	(United States) Tom Watson (27)	
May 2	Michelob-Houston Open	Texas	262,500	(United States) Ron Streck (2)	
May 10	Byron Nelson Golf Classic	Texas	300,000	(United States) Bruce Lietzke (8)	
May 17	Colonial National Invitation	Texas	300,000	(United States) Fuzzy Zoeller (3)	Invitational
May 24	Memorial Tournament	Ohio	350,000	(United States) Keith Fergus (1)	Invitational
May 31	Kemper Open	Maryland	400,000	(United States) Craig Stadler (3)	
Jun 7	Atlanta Classic	Georgia	300,000	(United States) Tom Watson (28)	
Jun 14	Manufacturers Hanover Westchester Classic	New York	400,000	(United States) Raymond Floyd (15)	
Jun 21	U.S. Open	Pennsylvania	360,000	(Australia) David Graham (7)	Major championship
Jun 28	Danny Thomas Memphis Classic	Tennessee	300,000	(United States) Jerry Pate (6)	
Jul 5	Western Open	Illinois	300,000	(United States) Ed Fiori (2)	
Jul 12	Greater Milwaukee Open	Wisconsin	250,000	(United States) Jay Haas (2)	
Jul 19	The Open Championship	England	£200,000	(United States) Bill Rogers (3)	Major championship (Note: Unofficial money event at the time, but retrospectively counted as an official win.)
Jul 19	Quad Cities Open	Illinois	200,000	(Canada) Dave Barr (1)	Alternate event
Jul 26	Anheuser-Busch Golf Classic	Virginia	300,000	(United States) John Mahaffey (6)	
Aug 2	Canadian Open	Canada	425,000	(England) Peter Oosterhuis (1)	
Aug 9	PGA Championship	Georgia	400,000	(United States) Larry Nelson (5)	Major championship
Aug 16	Sammy Davis Jr.-Greater Hartford Open	Connecticut	300,000	(United States) Hubert Green (17)	
Aug 23	Buick Open	Michigan	350,000	(United States) Hale Irwin (13)	
Aug 30	World Series of Golf	Ohio	400,000	(United States) Bill Rogers (4)	Limited-field event
Sep 6	B.C. Open	New York	275,000	(United States) Jay Haas (3)	
Sep 13	Pleasant Valley Jimmy Fund Classic	Massachusetts	300,000	(United States) Jack Renner (2)	
Sep 20	LaJet Classic	Texas	350,000	(United States) Tom Weiskopf (15)	New tournament
Sep 27	Hall of Fame	North Carolina	250,000	(United States) Morris Hatalsky (1)	
Oct 1	Texas Open	Texas	250,000	(United States) Bill Rogers (5)	
Oct 11	Southern Open	Georgia	200,000	(United States) J. C. Snead (7)	
Oct 18	Pensacola Open	Florida	200,000	(United States) Jerry Pate (7)	
Oct 25	Walt Disney World National Team Championship	Florida	400,000	(United States) Vance Heafner (1) and (United States) Mike Holland (1)	Team event

=== Unofficial events ===
The following events were sanctioned by the PGA Tour, but did not carry official money, nor were wins official.

Date	Tournament	Location	Purse ($)	Winner(s)	Notes
Sep 20	Ryder Cup	England	n/a	Team USA	Team event
Dec 6	JCPenney Mixed Team Classic	Florida	550,000	(United States) Beth Daniel and (United States) Tom Kite	Team event

== Money list ==
The money list was based on prize money won during the season, calculated in U.S. dollars.

Position	Player	Prize money ($)
1	(United States) Tom Kite	375,699
2	(United States) Raymond Floyd	359,360
3	(United States) Tom Watson	347,660
4	(United States) Bruce Lietzke	343,446
5	(United States) Bill Rogers	315,411
6	(United States) Jerry Pate	280,627
7	(United States) Hale Irwin	276,499
8	(United States) Craig Stadler	218,829
9	(United States) Curtis Strange	201,513
10	(United States) Larry Nelson	193,342

== Awards ==
Award	Winner	Ref.
PGA Player of the Year	(United States) Bill Rogers	
Rookie of the Year	(United States) Mark O'Meara	
Scoring leader (PGA Tour – Byron Nelson Award)	(United States) Tom Kite	
Scoring leader (PGA – Vardon Trophy)	(United States) Tom Kite	

== See also ==
- 1981 Senior PGA Tour
