= 1992 U.S. Open (golf) =

Coordinates: 36.568°N 121.950°W

Tournament information
- Dates: June 18–21, 1992
- Location: Pebble Beach, California
- Course: Pebble Beach Golf Links
- Tour: PGA Tour

Statistics
- Par: 72
- Length: 6,809 yards (6,226 m)
- Field: 156 players, 66 after cut
- Cut: 147 (+3)
- Prize fund: $1,500,000
- Winner's share: $275,000

Champion
- (United States) Tom Kite
- 285 (−3)

Location in the United States

The 1992 U.S. Open was the 92nd U.S. Open, held June 18–21 at Pebble Beach Golf Links in Pebble Beach, California. Tom Kite, long considered one of the best players to never win a major, finally broke through with a U.S. Open title, two strokes ahead of runner-up Jeff Sluman.

Gil Morgan was the story of the opening two rounds. He took the first-round lead with a 66, then recorded a second-round 69 for the 36-hole lead. After a birdie at the 3rd hole of the third round, Morgan was at 10-under, becoming the first in U.S. Open history to reach double-digits under-par. He got as low as 12-under after a birdie at the 7th, but then collapsed. He made three double-bogeys the rest of the round, but still held the lead by one over Kite, Ian Woosnam, and Mark Brooks. Morgan finally fell out of the lead after a double-bogey at the 6th in the final round. He eventually finished in 13th place, playing his final 29 holes in 17-over par. As Morgan was falling, Kite played steady golf, recording two birdies at 12 and 14 to offset bogeys at 16 and 17. He finished with an even-par 72 and a 3-under total of 285 for a two-stroke win over Jeff Sluman.

Windy conditions combined with lightning-fast greens made scoring conditions in the final round extremely difficult. Morgan shot an 81, Woosnam, one back at the start of the round, shot 79, Brooks, also one back, shot 84, and Nick Faldo, two back at the start, carded a 77. Colin Montgomerie shot 70 for the joint lowest score of the round and jumped over 25 players to finish in 3rd place. The final-round scoring average was 77.3, the third-highest in post-World War II U.S. Open history.

Greg Norman, who was ranked #7 in the world, did not qualify.

== Course layout ==
Hole	1	2	3	4	5	6	7	8	9	Out	10	11	12	13	14	15	16	17	18	In	Total
Yards	373	502	398	327	166	516	107	431	464	3,284	426	384	202	392	565	397	402	209	548	3,525	6,809
Par	4	5	4	4	3	5	3	4	4	36	4	4	3	4	5	4	4	3	5	36	72

Previous course lengths for major championships

- 6,825 yards (6,241 m) - par 72, 1982 U.S. Open
- 6,806 yards (6,223 m) - par 72, 1977 PGA Championship
- 6,812 yards (6,229 m) - par 72, 1972 U.S. Open

This was the last U.S. Open for a quarter-century to be played at a par-72 course. Since then, it has most often been played to a par of 70, and occasionally 71. Pebble Beach played to par 71 at all three of its subsequent U.S. Opens (2000, 2010, and 2019). The next par-72 course to host the U.S. Open, and the only one to date, was Erin Hills in 2017.

== Round summaries ==
=== First round ===
Thursday, June 18, 1992

Place	Player	Score	To par
1	(United States) Gil Morgan	66	-6
2	(United States) Curtis Strange	67	-5
T3	(United States) Andy Dillard	68	-4
T3	(United States) Phil Mickelson	68	-4
T3	(United States) Steve Pate	68	-4
6	(United States) Tom Lehman	69	-3
T7	(United States) Paul Azinger	70	-2
T7	(United States) Jay Don Blake	70	-2
T7	(United States) Mark Brooks	70	-2
T7	(United States) Mark Calcavecchia	70	-2
T7	(England) Nick Faldo	70	-2
T7	(United States) Jay Haas	70	-2
T7	(United States) Mark McCumber	70	-2
T7	(Scotland) Colin Montgomerie	70	-2
T7	(United States) Tom Purtzer	70	-2
T7	(United States) Willie Wood	70	-2

==== Scorecard ====
First round

Hole	1	2	3	4	5	6	7	8	9	10	11	12	13	14	15	16	17	18
Par	4	5	4	4	3	5	3	4	4	4	4	3	4	5	4	4	3	5

=== Second round ===
Friday, June 19, 1992

Place	Player	Score	To par
1	(United States) Gil Morgan	66-69=135	-9
2	(United States) Andy Dillard	68-70=138	-6
T3	(United States) Raymond Floyd	71-69=140	-4
T3	(Australia) Wayne Grady	74-66=140	-4
T5	(Sweden) Anders Forsbrand	71-70=141	-3
T5	(United States) Gary Hallberg	71-70=141	-3
T5	(Scotland) Colin Montgomerie	70-71=141	-3
T8	(United States) Fred Couples	72-70=142	-2
T8	(United States) Dan Forsman	72-70=142	-2
T8	(United States) Tom Purtzer	70-72=142	-2
T8	(United States) Duffy Waldorf	72-70=142	-2

Amateurs: Duval (+8), Schutte (+9), Voges (+11), Gogel (+17), Pride (+27).

==== Scorecard ====
Second round

Hole	1	2	3	4	5	6	7	8	9	10	11	12	13	14	15	16	17	18
Par	4	5	4	4	3	5	3	4	4	4	4	3	4	5	4	4	3	5

=== Third round ===
Saturday, June 20, 1992

Place	Player	Score	To par
1	(United States) Gil Morgan	66-69-77=212	-4
T2	(United States) Mark Brooks	70-74-69=213	-3
T2	(United States) Tom Kite	71-72-70=213	-3
T2	(Wales) Ian Woosnam	72-72-69=213	-3
T5	(England) Nick Faldo	70-76-68=214	-2
T5	(United States) Gary Hallberg	71-70-73=214	-2
T5	(United States) Joey Sindelar	74-72-68=214	-2
T8	(United States) Tom Lehman	69-74-72=215	-1
T8	(Zimbabwe) Mark McNulty	74-72-69=215	-1
T8	(United States) Scott Simpson	76-71-68=215	-1
T8	(United States) Craig Stadler	71-72-72=215	-1
T8	(United States) Payne Stewart	73-70-72=215	-1

==== Scorecard ====
Third round

Hole	1	2	3	4	5	6	7	8	9	10	11	12	13	14	15	16	17	18
Par	4	5	4	4	3	5	3	4	4	4	4	3	4	5	4	4	3	5

=== Final leaderboard ===
Sunday, June 21, 1992

Place	Player	Score	To par	Money ($)
1	(United States) Tom Kite	71-72-70-72=285	−3	275,000
2	(United States) Jeff Sluman	73-74-69-71=287	−1	137,500
3	(Scotland) Colin Montgomerie	70-71-77-70=288	E	84,245
T4	(England) Nick Faldo	70-76-68-77=291	+3	54,924
T4	(Zimbabwe) Nick Price	71-72-77-71=291	+3	54,924
T6	(United States) Billy Andrade	72-74-72-74=292	+4	32,316
T6	(United States) Jay Don Blake	70-74-75-73=292	+4	32,316
T6	(United States) Bob Gilder	73-70-75-74=292	+4	32,316
T6	(United States) Mike Hulbert	74-73-70-75=292	+4	32,316
T6	(United States) Tom Lehman	69-74-72-77=292	+4	32,316
T6	(United States) Joey Sindelar	74-72-68-78=292	+4	32,316
T6	(Wales) Ian Woosnam	72-72-69-79=292	+4	32,316

==== Scorecard ====
Final round

Hole	1	2	3	4	5	6	7	8	9	10	11	12	13	14	15	16	17	18
Par	4	5	4	4	3	5	3	4	4	4	4	3	4	5	4	4	3	5
(United States) Kite	−4	−4	−4	−2	−2	−3	−4	−4	−3	−3	−3	−4	−4	−5	−5	−4	−3	−3
(United States) Sluman	E	−1	−1	−1	−1	−1	−1	−1	E	E	E	E	E	E	E	E	E	−1
(Scotland) Montgomerie	+2	+1	+1	+1	+1	+2	+2	+1	+2	+1	+1	+1	+1	E	E	−1	E	E
(England) Faldo	−2	−2	−1	E	E	E	+2	+2	+2	+3	+3	+4	+4	+4	+4	+4	+4	+3
(Zimbabwe) Price	+4	+4	+4	+3	+3	+3	+4	+4	+4	+4	+4	+4	+3	+2	+3	+3	+3	+3
(United States) Andrade	+2	+2	+4	+4	+4	+4	+4	+4	+4	+5	+5	+4	+4	+3	+4	+4	+4	+4
(United States) Blake	+2	+1	+1	+1	E	−1	−1	E	E	+1	+1	+1	+1	E	E	+1	+2	+4
(United States) Gilder	+3	+1	+1	+1	+1	+1	+2	+2	+2	+2	+3	+3	+3	+3	+3	+4	+4	+4
(United States) Hulbert	E	−1	−1	E	E	E	E	E	+1	+2	+3	+4	+4	+4	+4	+4	+5	+4
(United States) Lehman	−1	−2	−2	−1	−1	−1	−1	E	E	+1	+2	+3	+4	+4	+3	+3	+4	+4
(United States) Sindelar	−1	−2	−2	−1	E	E	E	E	+2	+3	+4	+5	+5	+4	+4	+4	+4	+4
(Wales) Woosnam	−3	−3	−2	−2	−1	−1	E	+1	+2	+2	+2	+3	+3	+3	+4	+4	+4	+4
(United States) Morgan	−4	−4	−4	−2	−3	−1	E	E	+1	+1	+1	+2	+3	+3	+3	+4	+5	+5
(United States) Brooks	−3	−4	−2	−2	−1	E	+1	+1	+3	+4	+4	+5	+5	+6	+7	+7	+8	+9

Cumulative tournament scores, relative to par

Eagle	Birdie	Bogey	Double bogey
