= Spring 1977 PGA Tour Qualifying School graduates =

This is a list of Spring 1977 PGA Tour Qualifying School graduates. The event was held at the Pinehurst Resort in North Carolina. The tournament was 108 holes long. 415 players were in the field. Due to the size of the field the first three days, Tuesday through Thursday, included the addition of the No. 3 course and No. 5 course at Pinehurst. The No. 2 course would be used exclusively afterwards. After 54 holes the field was expected to be reduced to 120 players. After 72 holes it was expected to be reduced to 70 players. This was scheduled to be the last qualifying school to be held "under the present one-site format." Sections and regional qualifying branches were expected to be added for the next qualifying school in the fall.

== Tournament summary ==
The overall sequence of qualifying changed from previous q-schools. Before this year's tournament there would be 39 rounds of sectional qualifying ("PGA sections") followed by regional qualifying and then national qualifying.

Curtis Strange, who missed qualifying by one stroke at Fall 1976 PGA Tour Qualifying School, was considered to be "the head of the class." Another notable golfer in the field included former Walker Cup player Phil Hancock who also missed qualifying by one stroke from the previous year. Other notable golfers in the field included Bob Byman, one of Strange's teammates at Wake Forest, Greg Powers, Beau Baugh, and Lance Suzuki. Well-known international players included Canada's Bob Panasik and New Zealand's Simon Owen.

Lance Suzuki was the leader after three-round midway point of the tournament. However, he "faltered" during the fourth round's back nine to allow Curtis Strange and Bill Pelham to take the lead. Suzuki, however, "finished with a flourish," shooting a final round 66 (−6), including consecutive birdies between the 14th and 17th holes. He finished in second place. Hancock and Wayne Levi were in a duel for medallist. However, Hancock birdied the 14th and 16th holes "to overtake Levi." Hancock finished with a 69 (−3) to earn medallist honors at 417 (−14), one ahead of Suzuki and Levi. Overall the cut-off to graduate was at one-under-par 430.

A few notable players missed qualifying by a small margin. This included the professional Skeeter Heath. He opened well with rounds of 68-71-68. This put him in a tie for 8th place, four back of the lead, well within the cut-off number. However, he followed with rounds of 74 and 75 to put himself in a tie for 17th place, in danger of not qualifying. In the final round he shot a 76 to miss qualifying by two strokes. In addition, Bob Byman and his brother Ed Byman both missed qualifying by a shot.

== List of graduates ==
| # | Player | Notes |
|---|---|---|
| 1 | (United States) Phil Hancock | Winner of 1975 and 1976 Southeastern Conference individual title |
| T2 | (United States) Lance Suzuki | |
| | (United States) Wayne Levi | |
| 4 | (United States) Curtis Strange | Winner of 1974 NCAA Division I Championship |
| 5 | (United States) Bill Pelham | |
| 6 | (United States) Tom Tatum | |
| T7 | (United States) Brady Miller | Winner of 1973-74 Southwest Conference Fall Championships |
| | (United States) Tim Simpson | Winner of 1976 Southern Amateur |
| T9 | (United States) Ron Milanovich | |
| | (United States) Pat McDonald | |
| | (United States) Dave Sheff | |
| 12 | (United States) Skip Dunaway | |
| T13 | (United States) Jack Renner | Winner of 1973 U.S. Junior Amateur |
| | (United States) Wren Lum | |
| | (United States) Alan Pate | |
| | (United States) Terry Catlett | |
| | (United States) David Brownlee | |
| T18 | (United States) D. A. Weibring | |
| | (United States) Kim Young | |
| T20 | (United States) Tommy Valentine | Winner of 1970 Southeastern Conference individual title |
| | (United States) Jack Spradlin | |
| | (United States) David Thore | |
| T23 | (United States) Jim Chancey | |
| | (United States) Wayne Peddy | |
| | (United States) Terry Mauney | |
