= Scott Hoch =

American professional golfer (born 1955)

Personal information
- Full name: Scott Mabon Hoch
- Nationality: United States
- Born: November 24, 1955 (age 70) Raleigh, North Carolina, U.S.
- Height: 5 ft 11 in (1.80 m)
- Weight: 175 lb (79 kg; 12.5 st)

Career
- Sport: Golf
- College: Wake Forest University
- Turned professional: 1979
- Current tour: PGA Tour Champions
- Former tour: PGA Tour
- Professional wins: 23
- Highest ranking: 11 (April 6, 1997)

Number of wins by tour
- PGA Tour: 11
- European Tour: 1
- Japan Golf Tour: 3
- PGA Tour Champions: 4

Best results in major championships
- Masters Tournament: 2nd: 1989
- PGA Championship: T3: 1987
- U.S. Open: T5: 1993, 2002
- The Open Championship: T8: 2002

Achievements and awards
- Byron Nelson Award: 1986
- Vardon Trophy: 1986

Scott Mabon Hoch (/ˈhoʊk/ HOHK; born November 24, 1955) is an American professional golfer, who represented his country in the Ryder Cup in 1997 and 2002.

== Early life ==
In 1955, Hoch was born in Raleigh, North Carolina. While attending Needham B. Broughton High School, he won the 1973 North Carolina High School Athletic Association (NCHSAA) men's golf state championship.

== Amateur career ==
Hoch was a member of the golf team at Wake Forest University before graduating in 1978. In 1978, Hoch reached the final of the U.S. Amateur, losing 5 & 4 to John Cook. His good play earned him membership for top international team competitions like the 1978 Eisenhower Trophy and the 1979 Walker Cup. The Americans won both events. His achievements in 1978 led to an invitation to the 1979 Masters Tournament where he tied for 34th place, the second low amateur only behind Bobby Clampett.

== Professional career ==
In 1979, Hoch turned professional after competing in the U.S. Amateur.

Hoch has won several tournaments, including the Western Open, the Ford Championship at Doral, the Heineken Dutch Open and the Bob Hope Chrysler Classic. He also won the Vardon Trophy for lowest scoring average in 1986. He has featured in the top 20 of the Official World Golf Ranking.

Hoch is widely known for missing a two-foot-long putt that would have won the 1989 Masters Tournament on the first playoff hole, which he lost to Nick Faldo on the next hole. At the 1987 PGA Championship, Hoch three-putted the 18th hole on Sunday from inside of ten feet. A two-putt would have secured a playoff spot for him.

Hoch is also well known for his infamous quote regarding playing in The Open Championship at the "home of golf" at St Andrews. Hoch referred to this course, considered hallowed ground by most golfers around the world, as "the worst piece of mess" he had ever seen. Partly due to his Open Championship criticism Hoch has been characterized as an "ugly American." However he has played extensively abroad and done fairly well, with three victories on the Japan Golf Tour, a victory at European Tour's 1995 Dutch Open, and multiple victories on the Korean Tour. He also has runner-up finishes at the 1987 Dunlop Phoenix Tournament, 1994 Casio World Open on the Japan Golf Tour, 1995 New Zealand Open on the Australasian Tour, and the 1996 Dutch Open.

Hoch is the rare American golfer who has criticized the Ryder Cup. Before his participation in the 2002 event he described the Ryder Cup as "overrated" and thought that the competition had gotten too "inflammatory."

=== Senior career ===
In May 2007, Hoch won his first Champions Tour event, the FedEx Kinko's Classic. In February 2008, he won his second and third events in consecutive weeks.

In April 2019, Hoch won at the age of 63 the Bass Pro Shops Legends of Golf with Tom Pernice Jr. This first win in 11 years made him the oldest winner on the Champions Tour. Hoch's record held until October 2021, when Bernhard Langer broke it at the Dominion Energy Charity Classic.

== Personal life ==
In 1982, Hoch said that he feared he was going to die after an intruder came into his hotel room in Tucson, Arizona, held him and his wife, Sally, at gunpoint, and tied them up for an hour.

In 1989, Hoch said that he was "really hurt" after being named "Least Popular Golfer" in a poll of Tour players conducted by the Dallas Times Herald.

== Amateur wins ==
- 1977 Northeast Amateur

== Professional wins (23) ==
=== PGA Tour wins (11) ===
No.	Date	Tournament	Winning score	Margin of victory	Runner(s)-up
1	Jul 20, 1980	Quad Cities Open	−14 (63-66-68-69=266)	3 strokes	(United States) Curtis Strange
2	Apr 25, 1982	USF&G Classic	−10 (67-69-70=206) (Note: Shortened to 54 holes due to weather.)	2 strokes	(Australia) Bob Shearer, (United States) Tom Watson
3	Jul 22, 1984	Miller High Life QCO	−14 (67-67-66-66=266)	5 strokes	(United States) George Archer, (United States) Vance Heafner, (United States) Dave Stockton
4	Apr 30, 1989	Las Vegas Invitational	−24 (69-64-68-65-70=336)	Playoff	(United States) Robert Wrenn
5	Feb 20, 1994	Bob Hope Chrysler Classic	−26 (66-62-70-66-70=334)	3 strokes	(United States) Lennie Clements, (United States) Jim Gallagher Jr., (United States) Fuzzy Zoeller
6	Sep 3, 1995	Greater Milwaukee Open	−15 (68-71-65-65=269)	3 strokes	(United States) Marco Dawson
7	Jul 14, 1996	Michelob Championship at Kingsmill	−19 (64-68-66-67=265)	4 strokes	(United States) Tom Purtzer
8	Aug 31, 1997	Greater Milwaukee Open (2)	−16 (70-66-66-66=268)	1 stroke	(United States) Loren Roberts, (United States) David Sutherland
9	Apr 29, 2001	Greater Greensboro Chrysler Classic	−16 (68-68-67-69=272)	1 stroke	(United States) Brett Quigley, (United States) Scott Simpson
10	Jul 8, 2001	Advil Western Open	−21 (69-68-66-64=267)	1 stroke	(United States) Davis Love III
11	Mar 9, 2003	Ford Championship at Doral	−17 (66-70-66-69=271)	Playoff	(United States) Jim Furyk

PGA Tour playoff record (2–2)

No.	Year	Tournament	Opponent	Result
1	1989	Masters Tournament	(England) Nick Faldo	Lost to birdie on second extra hole
2	1989	Las Vegas Invitational	(United States) Robert Wrenn	Won with birdie on fifth extra hole
3	1995	Shell Houston Open	(United States) Payne Stewart	Lost to par on first extra hole
4	2003	Ford Championship at Doral	(United States) Jim Furyk	Won with birdie on third extra hole

=== European Tour wins (1) ===
No.	Date	Tournament	Winning score	Margin of victory	Runners-up
1	Jul 30, 1995	Heineken Dutch Open	−15 (65-70-69-65=269)	2 strokes	(Sweden) Michael Jonzon, (Scotland) Sam Torrance

=== PGA of Japan Tour wins (3) ===
No.	Date	Tournament	Winning score	Margin of victory	Runner-up
1	Nov 14, 1982	Taiheiyo Club Masters	−10 (73-70-66-69=278)	3 strokes	(Japan) Masahiro Kuramoto
2	Nov 28, 1982	Casio World Open	−6 (72-71-69-70=282)	1 stroke	(Japan) Tsuneyuki Nakajima
3	Nov 30, 1986	Casio World Open (2)	−12 (67-72-68-69=276)	6 strokes	(Spain) José María Olazábal

PGA of Japan Tour playoff record (0–1)

No.	Year	Tournament	Opponents	Result
1	1985	Casio World Open	(Australia) Wayne Grady, (United States) Hubert Green, (Japan) Nobumitsu Yuhara	Green won with par on second extra hole Grady and Yuhara eliminated by par on first hole

=== Korean Tour wins (2) ===
- 1990 Korea Open
- 1991 Korea Open

=== Other wins (2) ===
No.	Date	Tournament	Winning score	Margin of victory	Runners-up
1	Dec 14, 1986	Chrysler Team Championship (with (United States) Gary Hallberg)	−32 (61-63-64-63=251)	1 stroke	(United States) Mike Hulbert and (United States) Bob Tway
2	Dec 14, 2008	Merrill Lynch Shootout (with (United States) Kenny Perry)	−31 (65-60-60=185)	4 strokes	(United States) J. B. Holmes and (United States) Boo Weekley

Other playoff record (0–2)

No.	Year	Tournament	Opponents	Result
1	1985	Chrysler Team Championship (with (United States) Gary Hallberg)	(United States) Charlie Bolling and (United States) Brad Fabel, (United States) Jim Colbert and (United States) Tom Purtzer, (United States) Raymond Floyd and (United States) Hal Sutton, (United States) John Fought and (United States) Pat McGowan	Floyd/Sutton won with birdie on first extra hole
2	2000	Franklin Templeton Shootout (with (Paraguay) Carlos Franco)	(United States) Brad Faxon and (United States) Scott McCarron	Lost to birdie on first extra hole

=== PGA Tour Champions wins (4) ===
No.	Date	Tournament	Winning score	Margin of victory	Runner(s)-up
1	May 6, 2007	FedEx Kinko's Classic	−15 (67-66-68=201)	2 strokes	(United States) D. A. Weibring
2	Feb 10, 2008	Allianz Championship	−14 (67-67-68=202)	1 stroke	(United States) Brad Bryant, (United States) Bruce Lietzke
3	Feb 17, 2008	ACE Group Classic	−14 (68-66-68=202)	Playoff	(United States) Brad Bryant, (United States) Tom Jenkins, (United States) Tom Kite
4	Apr 28, 2019	Bass Pro Shops Legends of Golf (with (United States) Tom Pernice Jr.)	−23 (62-48-46=156)	5 strokes	(England) Paul Broadhurst and (United States) Kirk Triplett, (Paraguay) Carlos Franco and (Fiji) Vijay Singh

PGA Tour Champions playoff record (1–1)

No.	Year	Tournament	Opponents	Result
1	2008	ACE Group Classic	(United States) Brad Bryant, (United States) Tom Jenkins, (United States) Tom Kite	Won with birdie on first extra hole
2	2011	Liberty Mutual Legends of Golf (with (United States) Kenny Perry)	(United States) David Eger and (Republic of Ireland) Mark McNulty	Lost to par on second extra hole

== Results in major championships ==
Tournament	1975	1976	1977	1978	1979
Masters Tournament					T34
U.S. Open	CUT				
The Open Championship					
PGA Championship					

Tournament	1980	1981	1982	1983	1984	1985	1986	1987	1988	1989
Masters Tournament		T37		T27		T53			CUT	2
U.S. Open		CUT	WD	T48		T34		T36	T21	T13
The Open Championship										
PGA Championship	CUT	CUT		T61	T48	T12	T41	T3	T25	T7

Tournament	1990	1991	1992	1993	1994	1995	1996	1997	1998	1999
Masters Tournament	T14	T35			CUT	T7	T5	38	T16	T44
U.S. Open	T8	6	CUT	T5	T13	T56	T7	T10	CUT	CUT
The Open Championship	CUT					T68			CUT	
PGA Championship	T49	T43	CUT	T6	CUT	CUT	T61	T6	T29	T21

Tournament	2000	2001	2002	2003	2004
Masters Tournament	CUT	T37	CUT	CUT	
U.S. Open	T16	T16	T5	CUT	T53
The Open Championship		CUT	T8		
PGA Championship	T74	T7	CUT	T57	WD

Top 10
Did not play

WD = Withdrew
CUT = missed the half-way cut
"T" indicates a tie for a place

=== Summary ===
Tournament	Wins	2nd	3rd	Top-5	Top-10	Top-25	Events	Cuts made
Masters Tournament	0	1	0	2	3	5	18	13
U.S. Open	0	0	0	2	6	11	23	16
The Open Championship	0	0	0	0	1	1	5	2
PGA Championship	0	0	1	1	5	8	24	17
Totals	0	1	1	5	15	25	70	48

- Most consecutive cuts made – 10 (1983 Masters – 1987 PGA)
- Longest streak of top-10s – 2 (4 times)

== Results in The Players Championship ==
Tournament	1981	1982	1983	1984	1985	1986	1987	1988	1989
The Players Championship	T37	T13	CUT	T44	CUT	T14	T39	CUT	CUT

Tournament	1990	1991	1992	1993	1994	1995	1996	1997	1998	1999
The Players Championship	WD	CUT		CUT	CUT	WD	T19	2	T5	T6

Tournament	2000	2001	2002	2003	2004
The Players Championship	T13	T7	T4		T42

Top 10
Did not play

CUT = missed the halfway cut
WD = withdrew
"T" indicates a tie for a place

== Results in World Golf Championships ==
Tournament	1999	2000	2001	2002	2003	2004
Match Play	R32	QF		R64	QF	R64
Championship	T7	T17	NT^{1}	T23	T70	
Invitational	T23		T21	T55	T51	

^{1}Cancelled due to 9/11

Top 10
Did not play

QF, R16, R32, R64 = Round in which player lost in match play
"T" = Tied
NT = No tournament

== U.S. national team appearances ==
Amateur

- Eisenhower Trophy: 1978 (winners)
- Walker Cup: 1979 (winners)

Professional

- Presidents Cup: 1994 (winners), 1996 (winners), 1998
- Ryder Cup: 1997, 2002
- UBS Cup: 2001 (winners), 2002 (winners), 2003 (tie), 2004 (winners)

== See also ==
- Fall 1979 PGA Tour Qualifying School graduates
