= Mike Sullivan (golfer) =

American professional golfer (born 1955)

Personal information
- Full name: Michael James Sullivan
- Nationality: United States
- Born: January 1, 1955 (age 71) Gary, Indiana, U.S.
- Height: 6 ft 2 in (1.88 m)
- Weight: 200 lb (91 kg; 14 st)

Career
- Sport: Golf
- College: University of Florida
- Turned professional: 1975
- Former tours: PGA Tour; Champions Tour
- Professional wins: 4
- Highest ranking: 83 (August 13, 1989)

Number of wins by tour
- PGA Tour: 3

Best results in major championships
- Masters Tournament: T35: 1981
- PGA Championship: T12: 1989
- U.S. Open: T25: 1984
- The Open Championship: T14: 1983

Michael James Sullivan (born January 1, 1955) is an American professional golfer who has played on the PGA Tour, Nationwide Tour and Champions Tour.

== Early life ==
In 1955, Sullivan was born in Gary, Indiana. He attended Forest High School in Ocala, Florida. Sullivan played for the Forest Wildcats high school golf team.

== Amateur career ==
In the early 1970s, Sullivan accepted an athletic scholarship to attend the University of Florida in Gainesville, Florida. He played for coach Buster Bishop's Florida Gators men's golf team in 1974. While attending Florida, Sullivan was a roommate of fellow future PGA Tour player Andy Bean.

== Professional career ==
In 1975, Sullivan turned professional. He joined the PGA Tour in the following year after his success at Fall 1976 PGA Tour Qualifying School.

Sullivan won three PGA Tour events during his career. His first win came at the 1980 Southern Open which he calls the biggest thrill of his career due to being paired with Arnold Palmer in the third round. He had more than forty top-10 finishes in PGA Tour events during his career. Sullivan qualified for and played in every major championship at least twice. His best finish in a major championship was T12 at the 1989 PGA Championship.

Sullivan also had a runner-up finish on the European Tour, finishing 2nd place in the 1983 English Open. He lost to Hugh Baiocchi in a playoff.

Sullivan played some events on the Nationwide Tour in his 40s. His best finish in a Nationwide Tour event was a second-place tie in the 1998 NIKE Dominion Open.

Sullivan played on the Champions Tour in 2005 and 2006. His best finish was T9 at the 2005 Blue Angels Classic.

== Personal life ==
In 1996, Sullivan called for professional basketball player Mahmoud Abdul-Rauf to be shot after he refused to stand for the pledge of allegiance.

Sullivan lives in Ocala, Florida.

== Professional wins (4) ==
=== PGA Tour wins (3) ===
| No. | Date | Tournament | Winning score | Margin of victory | Runner(s)-up |
|---|---|---|---|---|---|
| 1 | Oct 5, 1980 | Southern Open | −11 (68-63-69-69=269) | 5 strokes | (United States) Dave Eichelberger, (United States) Johnny Miller |
| 2 | Apr 2, 1989 | Independent Insurance Agent Open | −8 (76-71-68-65=280) | 1 stroke | (United States) Craig Stadler |
| 3 | Sep 18, 1994 | B.C. Open | −18 (65-67-68-66=266) | 4 strokes | (United States) Jeff Sluman |

PGA Tour playoff record (0–4)

| No. | Year | Tournament | Opponent(s) | Result |
|---|---|---|---|---|
| 1 | 1978 | Buick-Goodwrench Open | (Australia) Jack Newton | Lost to birdie on first extra hole |
| 2 | 1981 | Southern Open | (United States) J. C. Snead | Lost to par on second extra hole |
| 3 | 1986 | Walt Disney World/Oldsmobile Classic | (United States) Raymond Floyd, (United States) Lon Hinkle | Floyd won with par on first extra hole |
| 4 | 1994 | Deposit Guaranty Golf Classic | (United States) Brian Henninger | Lost to birdie on first extra hole |

=== Other wins (1) ===
| No. | Date | Tournament | Winning score | Margin of victory | Runners-up |
|---|---|---|---|---|---|
| 1 | Aug 26, 1984 | Shootout at Jeremy Ranch (with (United States) Don January) | −38 (62-63-61-64=250) | 4 strokes | (United States) Miller Barber and (United States) Gil Morgan, (United States) Al Besselink and (United States) Donnie Hammond |

== Playoff record ==
European Tour playoff record (0–1)

| No. | Year | Tournament | Opponents | Result |
|---|---|---|---|---|
| 1 | 1983 | State Express Classic | (South Africa) Hugh Baiocchi, (Republic of Ireland) Eamonn Darcy | Baiocchi won with birdie on first extra hole |

== Results in major championships ==
| Tournament | 1978 | 1979 |
|---|---|---|
| Masters Tournament | | |
| U.S. Open | | |
| The Open Championship | | |
| PGA Championship | 34 | |

| Tournament | 1980 | 1981 | 1982 | 1983 | 1984 | 1985 | 1986 | 1987 | 1988 | 1989 |
|---|---|---|---|---|---|---|---|---|---|---|
| Masters Tournament | | T35 | | | | | | | | T46 |
| U.S. Open | | CUT | | T34 | T25 | | | | | |
| The Open Championship | | | | T14 | CUT | | | | | |
| PGA Championship | T30 | T56 | CUT | CUT | T65 | | T53 | T56 | | T12 |

| Tournament | 1990 | 1991 | 1992 | 1993 | 1994 | 1995 |
|---|---|---|---|---|---|---|
| Masters Tournament | | | | | | CUT |
| U.S. Open | | | | | CUT | |
| The Open Championship | | | | | | |
| PGA Championship | CUT | | | | | T63 |

Did not play

CUT = missed the half-way cut
"T" = tied

== See also ==
- Fall 1976 PGA Tour Qualifying School graduates
- 1985 PGA Tour Qualifying School graduates
- 1991 PGA Tour Qualifying School graduates
- Florida Gators
- List of Florida Gators men's golfers on the PGA Tour
