= Tom Kite =

American professional golfer (born 1949)

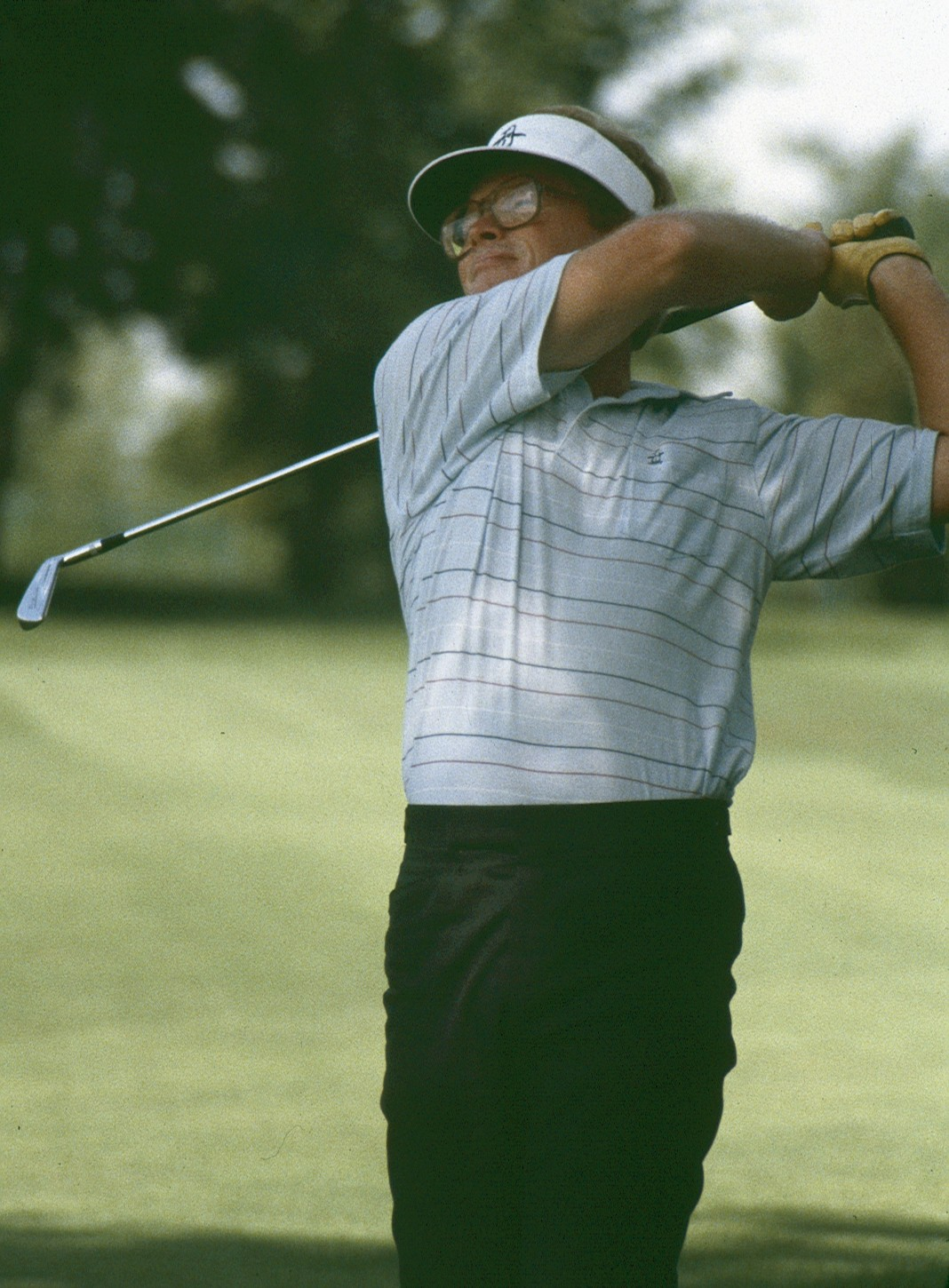
- Kite in 2008

Personal information
- Full name: Thomas Oliver Kite Jr.
- Nationality: United States
- Born: December 9, 1949 (age 76) McKinney, Texas, U.S.
- Height: 5 ft 9 in (175 cm)
- Weight: 170 lb (77 kg; 12 st)

Career
- Sport: Golf
- College: University of Texas
- Turned professional: 1972
- Current tour: PGA Tour Champions
- Former tour: PGA Tour
- Professional wins: 37
- Highest ranking: 5 (April 16, 1989)

Number of wins by tour
- PGA Tour: 19
- European Tour: 3
- PGA Tour of Australasia: 1
- PGA Tour Champions: 10
- Other: 5

Best results in major championships (wins: 1)
- Masters Tournament: 2nd/T2: 1983, 1986, 1997
- PGA Championship: T4: 1981, 1988
- U.S. Open: Won: 1992
- The Open Championship: T2: 1978

Achievements and awards
- World Golf Hall of Fame: 2004 (member page)
- Bob Jones Award: 1979
- PGA Tour money list winner: 1981, 1989
- Byron Nelson Award: 1981, 1982
- Vardon Trophy: 1981, 1982
- PGA Player of the Year: 1989
- GWAA Male Player of the Year: 1989

Thomas Oliver Kite Jr. (born December 9, 1949) is an American professional golfer and golf course architect. He won the U.S. Open in 1992 and spent 175 weeks in the top-10 of the Official World Golf Ranking between 1989 and 1994.

== Early life and amateur career ==
Kite was born in McKinney, Texas. He began playing golf at age six, and won his first tournament at age 11. Kite attended the University of Texas on a golf scholarship and was coached by Harvey Penick.

At Texas, Kite was a first-team All-American in 1972 when he also shared the individual NCAA championship with teammate Ben Crenshaw. He helped the Longhorns win two NCAA Team Championships in 1971 and 1972 and Southwest Conference Championships in 1970 and 1972. He was a second-team All-American in 1970 and 1971 and won nine collegiate tournaments during his four years.

== Professional career ==
In 1972, Kite turned professional and was a consistent money winner until his retirement. Known for his innovation, he was the first to add a third wedge to his bag, one of the first players to use a sports psychologist, and one of the first to emphasize physical fitness for game improvement. He also underwent laser eye surgery, due to his partial blindness, in a bid to improve his game late in his career.

He has 19 PGA Tour victories, including the 1992 U.S. Open at Pebble Beach. He competed on seven Ryder Cup squads (1979, 1981, 1983, 1985, 1987, 1989, 1993) and served as the 1997 captain. Kite holds a unique record of making the cut for the first four U.S. Opens held at Pebble Beach: 1972, 1982, 1992, and 2000. Kite also shares the distinction (with Gene Littler) of playing in the most Masters Tournaments without a win.

Kite was the first in Tour history to reach $6 million, $7 million, $8 million, and $9 million in career earnings. He was the Tour's leading money-winner in 1981 and 1989. In his prime, Kite had few peers with the short irons. In 1993, Johnny Miller referred to Kite as "the greatest short-iron player the game has seen."

=== Senior career ===
In 2005, he led the PGA Tour's Booz Allen Classic by one shot going into the final round at the age of 55. If he had been able to stay ahead, he would have beaten Sam Snead's record as the oldest winner on the PGA Tour by three years, but he fell away to finish tied 13th, seven shots behind Sergio García.

Kite played the Champions Tour until 2020, claiming ten victories, including one senior major, The Countrywide Tradition. At the 2012 U.S. Senior Open, Kite shot a front nine 28 (seven under par) in the first round. This was the lowest nine-hole score ever recorded in any USGA championship. He finished the tournament tied for 12th.

== In popular culture ==
- On May 18, 1991, Kite was impersonated by Kevin Nealon as part of the "Carsenio" sketch on Saturday Night Live featuring Dana Carvey impersonating Johnny Carson and Phil Hartman impersonating Ed McMahon.
- In 1996, Kite had a cameo in The Simpsons episode "Scenes from the Class Struggle in Springfield", in which he gave Homer Simpson golf tips.

== Awards and honors ==
- In 1970 and 1971, Kite earned second-team All-American honors. In 1972, Kite was a first-team All-American.
- In 1973, Kite was noted as the Golf Digest Rookie of the Year.
- In 1979, he was bestowed the Bob Jones Award.
- in 1981, he was awarded the Golf Writers Association Player of the Year.
- In 1981 and 1982, Kite was bestowed the Byron Nelson Award
- Kite was the Vardon Trophy winner in 1981 and 1982.
- In 1984, Kite was inducted into the University of Texas at Austin's Longhorns Hall of Honor.
- In 1989, he was named PGA of America Player of the Year.
- In 2004, Kite was inducted into the World Golf Hall of Fame.

== Amateur wins ==
- 1972 NCAA Championship (individual; tie with Ben Crenshaw)

== Professional wins (37) ==
=== PGA Tour wins (19) ===
Legend
Major championships (1)
Players Championships (1)
Tour Championships (1)
Other PGA Tour (16)

No.	Date	Tournament	Winning score	Margin of victory	Runner(s)-up
1	Jun 6, 1976	IVB-Bicentennial Golf Classic	−7 (71-70-70-66=277)	Playoff	(United States) Terry Diehl
2	Sep 4, 1978	B.C. Open	−17 (66-65-68-68=267)	5 strokes	(United States) Mark Hayes
3	Mar 8, 1981	American Motors Inverrary Classic	−14 (69-68-68-69=274)	1 stroke	(United States) Jack Nicklaus
4	Mar 7, 1982	Bay Hill Classic	−6 (69-70-70-69=278)	Playoff	(United States) Jack Nicklaus, (Zimbabwe) Denis Watson
5	Feb 6, 1983	Bing Crosby National Pro-Am	−12 (69-72-62-73=276)	2 strokes	(United States) Rex Caldwell, (United States) Calvin Peete
6	Mar 11, 1984	Doral-Eastern Open	−16 (68-69-70-65=272)	2 strokes	(United States) Jack Nicklaus
7	Jun 24, 1984	Georgia-Pacific Atlanta Golf Classic	−19 (69-67-66-67=269)	5 strokes	(United States) Don Pooley
8	May 5, 1985	MONY Tournament of Champions	−13 (64-72-70-69=275)	6 strokes	(United States) Mark McCumber
9	Aug 3, 1986	Western Open	−2 (70-75-73-68=286)	Playoff	(United States) Fred Couples, (South Africa) David Frost, (Zimbabwe) Nick Price
10	Jun 7, 1987	Kemper Open	−14 (64-69-68-69=270)	7 strokes	(United States) Chris Perry, (United States) Howard Twitty
11	Mar 12, 1989	Nestle Invitational (2)	−6 (68-72-67-71=278)	Playoff	(United States) Davis Love III
12	Mar 19, 1989	The Players Championship	−9 (69-70-69-71=279)	1 stroke	(United States) Chip Beck
13	Oct 29, 1989	Nabisco Championship	−8 (69-65-74-68=276)	Playoff	(United States) Payne Stewart
14	Aug 5, 1990	Federal Express St. Jude Classic	−15 (72-68-62-67=269)	Playoff	(United States) John Cook
15	Jan 6, 1991	Infiniti Tournament of Champions (2)	−16 (68-67-68-69=272)	1 stroke	(United States) Lanny Wadkins
16	May 10, 1992	BellSouth Classic (2)	−16 (70-65-72-65=272)	3 strokes	(United States) Jay Don Blake
17	Jun 21, 1992	U.S. Open	−3 (71-72-70-72=285)	2 strokes	(United States) Jeff Sluman
18	Feb 14, 1993	Bob Hope Chrysler Classic	−35 (67-67-64-65-62=325)	6 strokes	(United States) Rick Fehr
19	Feb 28, 1993	Nissan Los Angeles Open	−7 (73-66-67=206) (Note: Shortened to 54 holes due to weather.)	3 strokes	(Canada) Dave Barr, (United States) Fred Couples, (United States) Donnie Hammond, (United States) Payne Stewart

PGA Tour playoff record (6–4)

No.	Year	Tournament	Opponent(s)	Result
1	1976	IVB-Bicentennial Golf Classic	(United States) Terry Diehl	Won with par on fifth extra hole
2	1982	Bob Hope Desert Classic	(United States) Ed Fiori	Lost to birdie on second extra hole
3	1982	Bay Hill Classic	(United States) Jack Nicklaus, (Zimbabwe) Denis Watson	Won with birdie on first extra hole
4	1986	Western Open	(United States) Fred Couples, (South Africa) David Frost, (Zimbabwe) Nick Price	Won with birdie on first extra hole
5	1988	Kemper Open	(United States) Morris Hatalsky	Lost to par on second extra hole
6	1988	Nabisco Championship	(United States) Curtis Strange	Lost to birdie on second extra hole
7	1989	Nestle Invitational	(United States) Davis Love III	Won with par on second extra hole
8	1989	Nabisco Championship	(United States) Payne Stewart	Won with par on second extra hole
9	1990	Federal Express St. Jude Classic	(United States) John Cook	Won with birdie on first extra hole
10	1992	Bob Hope Chrysler Classic	(United States) John Cook, (United States) Rick Fehr, (United States) Mark O'Meara, (United States) Gene Sauers	Cook won with eagle on fourth extra hole Fehr eliminated by birdie on second hole Kite and O'Meara eliminated by birdie on first hole

=== European Tour wins (3) ===
Legend
Major championships (1)
Other European Tour (2)

No.	Date	Tournament	Winning score	Margin of victory	Runner(s)-up
1	Sep 7, 1980	European Open Championship	−8 (71-67-71-75=284)	1 stroke	(United States) Lon Hinkle, (United States) Leonard Thompson
2	Jun 21, 1992	U.S. Open	−3 (71-72-70-72=285)	2 strokes	(United States) Jeff Sluman
3	Oct 13, 1996	Oki Pro-Am	−15 (71-68-64-70=273)	1 stroke	(Argentina) Ángel Cabrera

=== New Zealand Golf Circuit wins (1) ===
No.	Date	Tournament	Winning score	Margin of victory	Runner-up
1	Nov 17, 1974	City of Auckland Classic	−16 (66-67-68-67=268)	7 strokes	(Australia) Stewart Ginn

=== Other wins (5) ===
No.	Date	Tournament	Winning score	Margin of victory	Runner(s)-up
1	Dec 6, 1981	JCPenney Mixed Team Classic (with (United States) Beth Daniel)	−18 (69-67-64-70=270)	2 strokes	(United States) Vance Heafner and (United States) Cathy Morse
2	Nov 8, 1987	Kirin Cup Individual Trophy	−16 (68-69-66-69=272)	1 stroke	(United States) Payne Stewart
3	Aug 25, 1992	Fred Meyer Challenge (with (United States) Billy Andrade)	−16 (64-64=128)	2 strokes	(United States) Steve Pate and (United States) Corey Pavin
4	Nov 22, 1992	Franklin Funds Shark Shootout (with (United States) Davis Love III)	−25 (65-69-59=191)	1 stroke	(United States) Billy Ray Brown and (Zimbabwe) Nick Price, (United States) Fred Couples and (United States) Raymond Floyd, (United States) Hale Irwin and (United States) Bruce Lietzke
5	Nov 17, 1996	Franklin Templeton Shark Shootout (2) (with (United States) Jay Haas)	−29 (67-60-60=187)	2 strokes	(United States) Hale Irwin and (United States) Lee Janzen, (United States) Craig Stadler and (United States) Lanny Wadkins

Other playoff record (0–1)

No.	Year	Tournament	Opponent	Result
1	1992	PGA Grand Slam of Golf	(Zimbabwe) Nick Price	Lost to par on first extra hole

=== Champions Tour wins (10) ===
Legend
Champions Tour major championships (1)
Other Champions Tour (9)

No.	Date	Tournament	Winning score	Margin of victory	Runner(s)-up
1	Apr 2, 2000	The Countrywide Tradition	−8 (68-70-71-71=280)	Playoff	(United States) Larry Nelson, (United States) Tom Watson
2	Jun 11, 2000	SBC Senior Open	−9 (71-68-68=207)	2 strokes	(United States) Bruce Fleisher
3	Sep 30, 2001	Gold Rush Classic	−22 (65-62-67=194)	1 stroke	(United States) Allen Doyle
4	Jan 20, 2002	MasterCard Championship	−17 (63-69-67=199)	6 strokes	(United States) John Jacobs
5	Mar 3, 2002	SBC Senior Classic	−4 (74-69-69=212)	Playoff	(United States) Tom Watson
6	Oct 13, 2002	Napa Valley Championship	−12 (66-66-72=204)	1 stroke	(United States) Bruce Fleisher, (United States) Fred Gibson
7	Aug 8, 2004	3M Championship	−13 (65-69-69=203)	1 stroke	(United States) Craig Stadler
8	Mar 12, 2006	AT&T Classic	−12 (70-64-70=204)	5 strokes	(United States) Gil Morgan
9	Aug 20, 2006	Boeing Greater Seattle Classic	−15 (71-64-66=201)	Playoff	(United States) Keith Fergus
10	Aug 24, 2008	Boeing Classic (2)	−14 (69-67-66=202)	2 strokes	(United States) Scott Simpson

Champions Tour playoff record (3–2)

No.	Year	Tournament	Opponent(s)	Result
1	2000	The Countrywide Tradition	(United States) Larry Nelson, (United States) Tom Watson	Won with birdie on sixth extra hole Nelson eliminated by par on second hole
2	2002	SBC Senior Classic	(United States) Tom Watson	Won with par on second extra hole
3	2006	Boeing Greater Seattle Classic	(United States) Keith Fergus	Won with birdie on first extra hole
4	2007	Liberty Mutual Legends of Golf	(United States) Jay Haas	Lost to par on first extra hole
5	2008	ACE Group Classic	(United States) Brad Bryant, (United States) Scott Hoch, (United States) Tom Jenkins	Hoch won with birdie on first extra hole

== Major championships ==
=== Wins (1) ===
Year	Championship	54 holes	Winning score	Margin	Runner-up
1992	U.S. Open	1 shot deficit	−3 (71-72-70-72=285)	2 strokes	(United States) Jeff Sluman

=== Results timeline ===
Tournament	1970	1971	1972	1973	1974	1975	1976	1977	1978	1979
Masters Tournament		T42	T27			T10	T5	T3	T18	5
U.S. Open	CUT		T19		T8	CUT	CUT	T27	T20	CUT
The Open Championship							T5		T2	T30
PGA Championship					T39	T33	T13	T13	CUT	T35

Tournament	1980	1981	1982	1983	1984	1985	1986	1987	1988	1989
Masters Tournament	T6	T5	T5	T2	T6	CUT	T2	T24	44	T18
U.S. Open	CUT	T20	29	T20	CUT	13	T35	T46	T36	T9
The Open Championship	T27		CUT	T29	T22	T8	CUT	T72	T20	T19
PGA Championship	T20	T4	T9	T67	T34	T12	T26	T10	T4	T34

Tournament	1990	1991	1992	1993	1994	1995	1996	1997	1998	1999
Masters Tournament	T14	56		CUT	4	CUT	CUT	2	38	
U.S. Open	T56	T37	1	CUT	T33	T67	T82	T68	T43	T60
The Open Championship	CUT	T44	T19	T14	T8	T58	T27	T10	T38	
PGA Championship	T40	T52	T21	T56	T9	T54	CUT	5	CUT	CUT

Tournament	2000	2001	2002	2003	2004
Masters Tournament			CUT		
U.S. Open	T32	T5	CUT	CUT	T57
The Open Championship	T70				
PGA Championship	T19	CUT			

Win
Top 10
Did not play

CUT = missed the halfway cut (3rd round cut in 1982 Open Championship)
"T" indicates a tie for a place.

=== Summary ===
Tournament	Wins	2nd	3rd	Top-5	Top-10	Top-25	Events	Cuts made
Masters Tournament	0	3	1	9	12	16	26	21
U.S. Open	1	0	0	2	4	9	33	24
The Open Championship	0	1	0	2	5	10	22	19
PGA Championship	0	0	0	3	6	12	28	23
Totals	1	4	1	16	27	47	109	87

- Most consecutive cuts made – 15 (1986 PGA – 1990 U.S. Open)
- Longest streak of top-10s – 2 (four times)

== The Players Championship ==
=== Wins (1) ===
Year	Championship	54 holes	Winning score	Margin	Runner-up
1989	The Players Championship	1 shot deficit	−9 (69-70-69-71=279)	1 stroke	(United States) Chip Beck

=== Results timeline ===
Tournament	1974	1975	1976	1977	1978	1979
The Players Championship	T19	T40	T17	CUT	T28	T9

Tournament	1980	1981	1982	1983	1984	1985	1986	1987	1988	1989
The Players Championship	T31		T27	T27	T51	T64	T4	T9	T11	1

Tournament	1990	1991	1992	1993	1994	1995	1996	1997	1998	1999
The Players Championship	T5	CUT	T35	CUT	T9	T43	CUT	CUT	T25	T77

Tournament	2000	2001	2002
The Players Championship	T66	T44	T36

Win
Top 10
Did not play

CUT = missed the halfway cut
"T" indicates a tie for a place.

== Senior major championships ==
=== Wins (1) ===
Year	Championship	Winning score	Margin	Runners-up
2000	The Countrywide Tradition	−8 (66-71-71-72=280)	Playoff	(United States) Larry Nelson, (United States) Tom Watson

=== Results timeline ===
Results not in chronological order before 2021.

Tournament	2000	2001	2002	2003	2004	2005	2006	2007	2008	2009
The Tradition	1	T24	T7	T2	T4	T36	T4	T4	T18	T11
Senior PGA Championship	T2	T23	T15	T10	T121	T10	T40	T7	T13	T14
U.S. Senior Open	3	15	3	T12	T3	T37	T55	T22	T12	CUT
Senior Players Championship	6	T10	T10	T2	T7	T39	T9	T25	T21	T47
Senior British Open Championship	–	–	–	4	T2	CUT	T10	T10	T16	T8

Tournament	2010	2011	2012	2013	2014	2015	2016	2017	2018	2019
The Tradition	T54	15	T47	T60	T59	72	T69	T68	72	WD
Senior PGA Championship	T29	CUT	CUT	T28	CUT	CUT	CUT	CUT	CUT	
U.S. Senior Open	T8	T29	T12	T44	T14			CUT	CUT	WD
Senior Players Championship	T16	T17	52	T27	79		WD	74	76	
Senior British Open Championship		T49	T24	T14						

Tournament	2020	2021
The Tradition	NT	78
Senior PGA Championship	NT	CUT
Senior Players Championship		
U.S. Senior Open	NT	
Senior British Open Championship	NT	

Win
Top 10
Did not play

CUT = missed the halfway cut
WD = withdrew
"T" indicates a tie for a place
NT = No tournament due to COVID-19 pandemic
Note: The Senior British Open was not a Champions Tour major until 2003.

== U.S. national team appearances ==
Amateur

- Eisenhower Trophy: 1970 (winners)
- Walker Cup: 1971

Professional

- Ryder Cup: 1979 (winners), 1981 (winners), 1983 (winners), 1985, 1987, 1989 (tie), 1993 (winners), 1997 (captain)
- World Cup: 1984, 1985
- Four Tours World Championship: 1987 (winners), 1989 (winners)
- Dunhill Cup: 1989 (winners), 1990, 1992, 1994
- Wendy's 3-Tour Challenge (representing Champions Tour): 2000, 2002, 2003, 2004, 2006
- UBS Cup: 2002 (winners), 2004 (winners)

== See also ==
- 1972 PGA Tour Qualifying School graduates
- List of golfers with most PGA Tour wins
- List of golfers with most Champions Tour wins
