= Fall 1976 PGA Tour Qualifying School graduates =

This is a list of the Fall 1976 PGA Tour Qualifying School graduates. The tournament was held at Rancho Viejo Resort and Golf Course in Brownsville, Texas. It was known for its "miserable weather."

== Tournament summary ==
A number of notable players did not graduate onto the PGA Tour. They included Curtis Strange, then considered by some the top amateur in the country. Strange finished with three consecutive bogeys to miss qualifying by a shot. It was considered "the most stunning development" of the event. In addition, "sure-fire bets" Phil Hancock and Wayne Levi were also unsuccessful.

A number of notable players were successful, however. Strange's teammate from Wake Forest, Jay Haas, did graduate. In his third attempt, Mark Lye qualified for the PGA Tour. After several successful seasons abroad, Australian Graham Marsh earned his PGA Tour card for the first time. Lye and Marsh tied for third place. The newly turned professional Keith Fergus earned medalist honors by a sizable margin defeating Mike Sullivan by ten shots.

== List of graduates ==
| # | Player | Notes |
|---|---|---|
| 1 | (United States) Keith Fergus | |
| 2 | (United States) Mike Sullivan | |
| T3 | (United States) Mark Lye | 1 PGA Tour of Australia win |
| | (Australia) Graham Marsh | 4 European Tour wins. 9 Japan Golf Tour wins |
| 5 | (United States) Jimmy Wittenberg | |
| T6 | (Argentina) Vicente Fernández | 1 European Tour win. |
| | (United States) Jay Haas | |
| | (United States) George Kunes | |
| | (United States) Jeff Mitchell | |
| | (United States) Greg Pitzer | |
| T11 | (United States) Dick Mast | |
| | (Colombia) Alberto Rivadeneira | |
| T13 | (United States) John Abendroth | |
| | (United States) Jim Barker | |
| | (United States) Mark Pfeil | |
| | (United States) Bobby Stroble | |
| T17 | (United States) David Canipe | |
| | (United States) Bruce Ford | |
| | (United States) Richard Friedman | |
| | (Australia) Jack Newton | 3 European Tour wins. 1 PGA Tour of Australia win |
| | (United States) Doug Schryer | |
| | (United States) Ray Sovik | |
| | (United States) Larry Webb | |
| T24 | (United States) Ray Arinno | |
| | (United States) Jim Booros | |
| | (United States) Peter Jacobsen | |
| | (United States) Don Pooley | |
| | (United States) Mike Reid | Led 1976 U.S. Open after first round |
| | (United States) Ron Streck | |
