= Ron Streck =

American professional golfer

Personal information
- Full name: Ronald Raymond Streck
- Nationality: United States
- Born: July 17, 1954 (age 72) Tulsa, Oklahoma, U.S.
- Height: 6 ft 0 in (1.83 m)
- Weight: 190 lb (86 kg; 14 st)

Career
- Sport: Golf
- College: University of Tulsa
- Turned professional: 1976
- Former tours: PGA Tour; Nationwide Tour; Champions Tour
- Professional wins: 6

Number of wins by tour
- PGA Tour: 2
- Korn Ferry Tour: 1
- PGA Tour Champions: 1

Best results in major championships
- Masters Tournament: 32nd: 1982
- PGA Championship: 4th: 1979
- U.S. Open: T23: 1977
- The Open Championship: T44: 1981

Ronald Raymond Streck (born July 17, 1954) is an American professional golfer who has played on the PGA Tour and Nationwide Tour, and is a current player on the Champions Tour.

== Early life and amateur career ==
In 1954, Streck was born in Tulsa, Oklahoma. His father started him playing golf at the age of 3 1/2. Streck attended the University of Tulsa from 1973 to 1976, and was twice an All-American.

== Professional career ==
In 1976, Streck turned pro. In 1978, he won his first PGA Tour tournament, the San Antonio Texas Open.

Streck had several notable "firsts" in the annals of professional golf, earning him the nickname "Milestone Man". He was the first PGA Tour player to play with Metalwoods. He was the first PGA player to win with Metalwoods (at the 1981 Michelob-Houston Open). With his victory in 2005 at the Commerce Bank Championship, he became the first player to win events on all three U.S.-based men's professional Tours (PGA, Nationwide, and Champions).

In addition, Streck won in the 1983 Hassan II Golf Trophy in Morocco. The tournament was later incorporated into the European Tour.

== Personal life ==
Streck is married with three children and lives in Tulsa, Oklahoma.

== Awards and honors ==
In 1997, Streck was inducted into the University of Tulsa Athletics Hall of Fame.

== Professional wins (6) ==
=== PGA Tour wins (2) ===
No.	Date	Tournament	Winning score	Margin of victory	Runners-up
1	Sep 17, 1978	San Antonio Texas Open	−15 (73-67-63-62=265)	1 stroke	(United States) Hubert Green, (United States) Lon Hinkle
2	May 2, 1981	Michelob-Houston Open	−15 (68-68-62=198) (Note: Shortened to 54 holes due to weather.)	3 strokes	(United States) Hale Irwin, (United States) Jerry Pate

PGA Tour playoff record (0–1)

No.	Year	Tournament	Opponent	Result
1	1985	Isuzu-Andy Williams San Diego Open	(United States) Woody Blackburn	Lost to par on fourth extra hole

=== Nike Tour wins (1) ===
No.	Date	Tournament	Winning score	Margin of victory	Runner-up
1	Feb 21, 1993	Nike Yuma Open	−12 (71-64-66=201)	Playoff	(United States) Chris DiMarco

Nike Tour playoff record (1–0)

No.	Year	Tournament	Opponent	Result
1	1993	Nike Yuma Open	(United States) Chris DiMarco	Won with par on second extra hole

=== Other wins (2) ===
- 1983 Hassan II Golf Trophy
- 1984 Chrysler Team Championship (with Phil Hancock)

=== Champions Tour wins (1) ===
No.	Date	Tournament	Winning score	Margin of victory	Runner-up
1	Jul 3, 2005	Commerce Bank Championship	−16 (62-68-67=197)	3 strokes	(United States) Jim Ahern

== Results in major championships ==
Tournament	1977	1978	1979	1980	1981	1982	1983	1984	1985
Masters Tournament			CUT	CUT		32			
U.S. Open	T23		CUT	T54		T56			CUT
The Open Championship					T44				
PGA Championship			4	T59	T49	T22	76	CUT	T65

Top 10
Did not play

CUT = missed the half-way cut
"T" indicates a tie for a place

== See also ==
- Fall 1976 PGA Tour Qualifying School graduates
