= Phil Hancock =

American professional golfer (1953–2024)

Personal information
- Full name: Phillip Ranson Hancock
- Nationality: United States
- Born: October 30, 1953 Greenville, Alabama, U.S.
- Died: December 12, 2024 (aged 71)
- Height: 5 ft 10 in (1.78 m)
- Weight: 160 lb (73 kg; 11 st)

Career
- Sport: Golf
- College: University of Florida
- Turned professional: 1976
- Former tour: PGA Tour
- Professional wins: 4

Number of wins by tour
- PGA Tour: 1
- Other: 3

Best results in major championships
- Masters Tournament: CUT: 1981
- PGA Championship: T16: 1978
- U.S. Open: T20: 1978
- The Open Championship: DNP

Achievements and awards
- Haskins Award: 1976

Phillip Ranson Hancock (October 30, 1953 – December 12, 2024) was an American professional golfer who played on the PGA Tour.

== Early life ==
Hancock learned to play golf growing up in Greenville, Alabama, from his father a local dentist. Hancock and his friends would often play 45 or 54 holes in the summer time. He won his first tournament at the 1969 Alabama State Junior Championship at age 16.

== Amateur career ==
After high school, Hancock accepted an athletic scholarship to attend the University of Florida in Gainesville, Florida, where he played for coach Buster Bishop's Florida Gators men's golf team in National Collegiate Athletic Association (NCAA) competition from 1973 to 1976. During his freshman year, the Gators golf team, which included future PGA Tour members Andy Bean, Gary Koch and Woody Blackburn, won the 1973 NCAA Championship.

As a Gator golfer, Hancock received All-SEC honors for four consecutive years (second-team in 1973 and 1974; first-team in 1975 and 1976), and was an All-American in 1974, 1975 and 1976. He won the SEC individual championship in 1975 and 1976, and was the winner of the Haskins Award in 1976.

In 1976, Hancock graduated from the University of Florida with a bachelor's degree in public relations.

== Professional career ==
In 1976, Hancock turned professional. He played briefly on the European Tour after failing to earn a spot on the PGA Tour by a stroke at Fall 1976 PGA Tour Qualifying School. Hancock joined the PGA Tour the following year. He played full-time on the PGA Tour from 1977 to 1985; his career was plagued by long absences due to back ailments.

After leaving the tour, he held various teaching and club professional jobs in Florida and Alabama. Hancock worked as a club and taught professional at Indian Pines Golf Course in Auburn, Alabama.

== Personal life ==
Hancock lived in Montgomery, Alabama. He was married to Jean; they had two children.

He died from amyotrophic lateral sclerosis (ALS) on December 12, 2024, at the age of 71.

== Awards and honors ==
- Hancock was the recipient of All-SEC honors for all four years while he was at the University of Florida: in 1973, 1974, 1975, and 1976.
- Hancock earned All-American honors three times: in 1974, 1975, and 1976.
- In 1976, he won the Haskins Award, bestowed to the top college golfer of the year.
- In 1992, he was inducted into the University of Florida Athletic Hall of Fame as a "Gator Great."

== Amateur wins ==
- 1969 Alabama State Junior Championship
- 1975 SEC Championship (individual)
- 1976 SEC Championship (individual)

== Professional wins (4) ==
=== PGA Tour wins (1) ===
No.	Date	Tournament	Winning score	Margin of victory	Runner-up
1	Sep 14, 1980	Hall of Fame	−9 (71-67-67-70=275)	1 stroke	(United States) Scott Simpson

=== Other wins (3) ===
- 1977 Colombian Open
- 1981 Melitta Classic-Bell's Cup (Brazil)
- 1984 Chrysler Team Championship (with Ron Streck)

== Results in major championships ==
Tournament	1974	1975	1976	1977	1978	1979	1980	1981	1982	1983	1984	1985	1986	1987	1988	1989	1990
Masters Tournament								CUT									
U.S. Open	CUT		CUT	T44	T20		T58										
PGA Championship					T16	CUT		CUT		CUT	CUT						CUT

Note: Hancock never played in The Open Championship.

Did not play

CUT = missed the half-way cut
"T" indicates a tie for a place

== U.S. national team appearances ==
- PGA Cup: 1990 (winners)

== See also ==
- Spring 1977 PGA Tour Qualifying School graduates
- List of Florida Gators men's golfers on the PGA Tour
- List of University of Florida alumni
- List of University of Florida Athletic Hall of Fame members
