= Tim Simpson =

American professional golfer (born 1956)

Personal information
- Full name: Timothy Jay Simpson
- Nationality: United States
- Born: May 6, 1956 (age 70) Atlanta, Georgia, U.S.
- Height: 5 ft 10 in (1.78 m)
- Weight: 210 lb (95 kg; 15 st)

Career
- Sport: Golf
- College: University of Georgia
- Turned professional: 1977
- Former tours: PGA Tour; Tarheel Tour; Champions Tour
- Professional wins: 10
- Highest ranking: 18 (October 28, 1990)

Number of wins by tour
- PGA Tour: 4
- Other: 6

Best results in major championships
- Masters Tournament: T18: 1985
- PGA Championship: T8: 1990
- U.S. Open: T5: 1990
- The Open Championship: T12: 1990

Achievements and awards
- Champions Tour Comeback Player of the Year: 2006

Timothy Jay Simpson (born May 6, 1956) is an American professional golfer. He played on the PGA Tour and the Nationwide Tour and currently plays on the Champions Tour.

== Early life and amateur career ==
Simpson was born and raised in Atlanta, Georgia. He attended high school at Woodward Academy where he was the Atlanta Junior Champion, Georgia Junior Champion and Westlake National Junior Champion.

Simpson attended the University of Georgia in Athens, Georgia, and was a member of the golf team.

== Professional career ==
In 1977, Simpson left college early and turned professional at the age 20. He earned his tour card at 21 years, 2 months. Simpson's first win in professional golf came at the 1981 Cacharel World Under-25 Championship in Nimes, France. His first PGA Tour win came three seasons later at the 1985 Southern Open. His career year was 1989 when he captured the PGA Tour's Comeback Player of the Year award, and won two Tour events: the USF&G Classic and the Walt Disney World/Oldsmobile Classic. He had another good year in 1990: repeating as Walt Disney World/Oldsmobile Classic Champion, and posting his best finishes in the U.S. Open, British Open and PGA Championship. He has 66 Top-10 finishes in PGA Tour events.

Simpson's PGA Tour career was brought to a sudden end due to his contracting Lyme disease on a hunting trip in 1991, and the neurological pathological condition resulting from it. He has had brain surgery and spinal fusion surgery. In his late thirties and forties, his health improved enough to allow him to play some on the Nationwide Tour. His best finishes in this venue were a 2nd at the 1995 NIKE Buffalo Open and a T-2 at the 1995 NIKE South Carolina Classic.

During his career Simpson was called one of the greatest ball strikers in the game's history by golfing greats Butch Harmon, Jack Nicklaus, and Johnny Miller. Early in his career, he was mentored by long-time friends, Sam Snead and J. C. Snead.

Simpson began play on the Champions Tour in 2006.

== Personal life ==
Simpson lives in Greensboro, Georgia.

== Awards and honors ==
- In 1989, he won the PGA Tour's Comeback Player of the Year.
- In 1990, Simpson was awarded the Georgia Professional Athlete of the Year award.
- In 2004, Simpson was inducted into the Georgia Sports Hall of Fame
- In 2006, Simpson was inducted into the Georgia Golf Hall of Fame

== Amateur wins ==
- 1975 Palmetto Invitational College Tournament
- 1976 Southern Amateur

== Professional wins (10) ==
=== PGA Tour wins (4) ===
| No. | Date | Tournament | Winning score | Margin of victory | Runner(s)-up |
|---|---|---|---|---|---|
| 1 | Oct 6, 1985 | Southern Open | −16 (64-64-69-67=264) | 2 strokes | (United States) Clarence Rose |
| 2 | Mar 26, 1989 | USF&G Classic | −14 (68-67-70-69=274) | 2 strokes | (Australia) Greg Norman, (United States) Hal Sutton |
| 3 | Oct 21, 1989 | Walt Disney World/Oldsmobile Classic | −16 (65-67-70-70=272) | 1 stroke | (United States) Donnie Hammond |
| 4 | Oct 20, 1990 | Walt Disney World/Oldsmobile Classic (2) | −24 (64-64-65-71=264) | 1 stroke | (United States) John Mahaffey |

PGA Tour playoff record (0–2)

| No. | Year | Tournament | Opponents | Result |
|---|---|---|---|---|
| 1 | 1989 | Anheuser-Busch Golf Classic | (United States) Mike Donald, (United States) Hal Sutton | Donald won with birdie on fourth extra hole Sutton eliminated by par on third hole |
| 2 | 1990 | Doral-Ryder Open | (United States) Paul Azinger, (United States) Mark Calcavecchia, (Australia) Greg Norman | Norman won with eagle on first extra hole |

=== Tarheel Tour wins (1) ===
| No. | Date | Tournament | Winning score | Margin of victory | Runner-up |
|---|---|---|---|---|---|
| 1 | Apr 14, 2006 | Olde Sycamore Open | −13 (69-67-67=203) | 1 stroke | (United States) Brent Delahoussaye |

=== Other wins (5) ===
- 1980 Georgia Open (tie with Bob Tway)
- 1981 Georgia Open, Cacharel World Under-25 Championship
- 1984 Georgia Open
- 1987 Georgia Open

== Results in major championships ==
| Tournament | 1978 | 1979 | 1980 | 1981 | 1982 | 1983 | 1984 | 1985 | 1986 | 1987 | 1988 | 1989 | 1990 | 1991 | 1992 | 1993 | 1994 |
|---|---|---|---|---|---|---|---|---|---|---|---|---|---|---|---|---|---|
| Masters Tournament | | | | | | | | T18 | CUT | | CUT | CUT | CUT | CUT | | | |
| U.S. Open | CUT | CUT | T37 | T43 | | T32 | T11 | T46 | CUT | T14 | CUT | CUT | T5 | T26 | | | CUT |
| The Open Championship | | | | | | T45 | | | | | | | T12 | T57 | | | |
| PGA Championship | | | CUT | | CUT | T36 | T25 | CUT | CUT | T43 | CUT | T27 | T8 | CUT | | | |

Top 10
Did not play

CUT = missed the half-way cut
"T" = tied

=== Summary ===
| Tournament | Wins | 2nd | 3rd | Top-5 | Top-10 | Top-25 | Events | Cuts made |
|---|---|---|---|---|---|---|---|---|
| Masters Tournament | 0 | 0 | 0 | 0 | 0 | 1 | 6 | 1 |
| U.S. Open | 0 | 0 | 0 | 1 | 1 | 3 | 14 | 8 |
| The Open Championship | 0 | 0 | 0 | 0 | 0 | 1 | 3 | 3 |
| PGA Championship | 0 | 0 | 0 | 0 | 1 | 2 | 11 | 5 |
| Totals | 0 | 0 | 0 | 1 | 2 | 7 | 34 | 17 |

- Most consecutive cuts made – 7 (1983 U.S. Open – 1985 U.S. Open)
- Longest streak of top-10s – 1 (twice)

== U.S. national team appearances ==
- Four Tours World Championship: 1990

== Filmography ==
=== Television ===
| 2022 | Stranger Things | Golfer on tv | 1 episode |

== See also ==
- Spring 1977 PGA Tour Qualifying School graduates
- 1993 PGA Tour Qualifying School graduates
- 1996 PGA Tour Qualifying School graduates
