= Chrysler Team Championship =

Golf tournament in Florida, US (1983–1990)

The Chrysler Team Championship was an unofficial event on the PGA Tour from 1983 to 1990. It used a two-man better-ball format. It was played at Boca West Resort and Club and Broken Sound Country Club in Boca Raton, Florida, from 1983 to 1986; at Palm Beach Polo Club, Wellington Club and Greenview Cove Country Club in West Palm Beach, Florida, from 1987 to 1988; at Palm Beach Polo Club (Cypress and Dunes courses) and Wellington Club in 1989; and at Binks Forest Country Club and Wellington Club in Wellington, Florida, in 1990. In its final year it was known as the Sazale Classic.

At the 1985 Chrysler Team Championship, five teams tied for first. The crowded playoff featuring ten players was won on the first extra hole when Hal Sutton made a birdie putt.

== Winners ==
Sazale Classic

- 1990 Fred Couples & Mike Donald

Chrysler Team Championship

- 1989 David Ogrin & Ted Schulz
- 1988 George Burns & Wayne Levi
- 1987 Mike Hulbert & Bob Tway
- 1986 Gary Hallberg & Scott Hoch
- 1985 Raymond Floyd & Hal Sutton
- 1984 Phil Hancock & Ron Streck
- 1983 Johnny Miller & Jack Nicklaus
