= Greg Twiggs =

American professional golfer (born 1960)

Personal information
- Full name: Gregory Wofford Twiggs
- Nationality: United States
- Born: October 30, 1960 (age 66) Los Angeles, California, U.S.

Career
- Sport: Golf
- College: San Diego State University
- Turned professional: 1984
- Former tour: PGA Tour
- Professional wins: 3

Number of wins by tour
- PGA Tour: 1
- Korn Ferry Tour: 1

Best results in major championships
- Masters Tournament: T43: 1989
- PGA Championship: T22: 1993
- U.S. Open: T33: 1993
- The Open Championship: DNP

Gregory Wofford Twiggs (born October 30, 1960) is an American professional golfer who has played on the PGA Tour and the Nationwide Tour.

== Early life and amateur career ==
Twiggs was born in Los Angeles and grew up in southern California. He attended San Diego State University where he was a member of the golf team, a first team All-American his senior year.

== Professional career ==
Twiggs turned professional in 1984. He played full-time on the PGA Tour from 1984 until 1992, and had one official win. After 1992, he spent the remainder of the mid-1990s split between the PGA Tour and the Nationwide Tour. In the late 1990s, he played primarily on the Nationwide Tour. His best finish in a major was T-22 at the 1993 PGA Championship.

== Personal life ==
In 1992, Twiggs and his wife decided to move from southern California to Greensboro, North Carolina. They live there today with their two daughters.

== Professional wins (3) ==
=== PGA Tour wins (1) ===
No.	Date	Tournament	Winning score	Margin of victory	Runners-up
1	Feb 19, 1989	Shearson Lehman Hutton Open	−17 (68-70-64-69=271)	2 strokes	(Australia) Steve Elkington, (United States) Brad Faxon, (United States) Mark O'Meara, (United States) Mark Wiebe

=== Nike Tour wins (1) ===
No.	Date	Tournament	Winning score	Margin of victory	Runners-up
1	Jun 9, 1996	Nike Cleveland Open	−18 (66-72-64-68=270)	1 stroke	(United States) Jimmy Johnston

=== Other wins (1) ===
- 1984 California State Open

== Playoff record ==
Asia Golf Circuit playoff record (0–1)

No.	Year	Tournament	Opponent	Result
1	1987	Benson & Hedges Malaysian Open	(Australia) Terry Gale	Lost to birdie on first extra hole

== Results in major championships ==
Tournament	1989	1990	1991	1992	1993
Masters Tournament	T43				
U.S. Open		T51		T64	T33
PGA Championship	T63				T22

Note: Twiggs never played in The Open Championship.

Did not play

"T" = tied

== See also ==
- 1984 PGA Tour Qualifying School graduates
- 1988 PGA Tour Qualifying School graduates
- 1992 PGA Tour Qualifying School graduates
