= Sanderson Farms Championship =

Golf tournament

Coordinates: 32.397°N 90.098°W

Tournament information
- Location: Jackson, Mississippi
- Established: 1968
- Course: Country Club of Jackson
- Par: 72
- Length: 7,461 yards (6,822 m)
- Organized by: Century Club Charities
- Tour: PGA Tour
- Format: Stroke play
- Prize fund: $6,000,000
- Month played: October
- Final year: 2025
- Website: sandersonfarmschampionship.com

Tournament record score
- Aggregate: 263 Dan Halldorson (1986)
- To par: −24 Scott Stallings (2012) −24 Steven Fisk (2025)

Final champion
- (United States) Steven Fisk

Location map
- Location in United States Location in Mississippi

The Sanderson Farms Championship was a professional golf tournament on the PGA Tour, played annually in Mississippi. It moved to the Country Club of Jackson in Jackson in autumn 2014, early in the 2015 season.

The tournament was part of the PGA Tour schedule from 1968 up until its final year in 2025. It had raised more than $8.1 million for statewide charities. Originally played at the Hattiesburg Country Club in Hattiesburg, the event moved in 1994 to Annandale Golf Club in Madison, which hosted through 2013.

Since 2013, the tournament's title sponsor had been Sanderson Farms, a poultry farming corporation based in Laurel, Mississippi. The tournament's host organization, Century Club Charities, is a non-profit, tax-exempt 501(c)(3) organization whose mission is promoting the game of golf for the benefit of charity. The Sanderson Farms Championship's primary charity is Friends of Children's Hospital, which benefits the Batson's Children Hospital.

== Course ==
The Country Club of Jackson opened in 1914. It is a private club with 27 championship holes, 18 of which were re-designed by John Fought in 2008 and measure 7,400 yards (6,800 m) from the championship tees. Fought's layout incorporates classic Donald Ross flavor – parkland style routing with smallish, tricky greens – which range in size from 5,000 to 8,500 square feet (460 to 790 m^{2}).

== History ==
The tournament was founded as the Magnolia Classic in 1968 and retained that title through 1985, with notable winners including Roger Maltbie, Craig Stadler, and Payne Stewart. Since 1986, the tournament has had several different names under title sponsorship agreements with Deposit Guaranty (1986–1998), Farm Bureau (1999–2006), Viking (2007–2011) and Sanderson Farms (since 2013); in 2012, it was without a title sponsor and named the True South Classic.

In the past, this tournament was generally played opposite of a major or limited field tournament (officially termed an "alternate event" by the PGA Tour). It later became part of the Fall Series, a group of events held after The Tour Championship, before returning to its former status as an alternate event in 2011. In either case, the leading players in men's professional golf rarely participate. Until 1994, it was played opposite the Masters Tournament and then opposite The Open Championship in the mid-1990s. More recently, it played opposite various World Golf Championships and The Tour Championship. From 2007 to 2010, it generally played opposite the major team events involving PGA Tour players, namely the Ryder Cup and Presidents Cup. In 2011, it returned to the PGA Tour regular season opposite the British Open in July.

It has been an official money event on the PGA Tour since 1994. Prior to that, it was a satellite event with the money counting but the wins counting as unofficial, except from 1983 to 1985, when it was instead part of the developmental Tournament Players Series.

From 2007 to 2010, it was part of the Fall Series. Because the FedEx Cup season championship was already determined by that time, elite players generally passed on Fall Series events; most players in the tournament were trying to either make the Top 125 on the money list and retain their tour cards, or earn a quick two-year exemption by winning. The 2007 event was played in the same week as the Presidents Cup; most of the top Tour players played in that event instead of the Viking Classic. The situation was similar in 2008, with the tournament being scheduled opposite the Ryder Cup. The 2009 purse was due to be $3,700,000, with $666,000 going to the winner. That year's event was also to be the first in the tournament's recent history to be the sole event on the PGA Tour schedule for that week, as it had been moved to the end of October with a scheduled finish on November 1. However, the tournament was canceled on October 31, due to unplayable conditions at the Annandale Golf Club. The event was not rescheduled. The 2010 event was again held opposite the Ryder Cup. This would be the tournament's last fall edition, as it would move into the regular season the following year. In 2013, the title sponsor changed to Sanderson Farms. The tournament was not held in the 2013–14 season because of the new PGA Tour wraparound season; the 2014 tournament, part of the 2014–15 season, moved to late October and was played opposite the WGC-HSBC Champions in China.

As an alternate event, the winner did not receive an invitation to the Masters Tournament, but did earn a trip to the PGA Championship, a two-year PGA Tour exemption, a minimum of 24 OWGR points, and 300 FedEx Cup points. For the 2019–20 season, the tournament was upgraded from an alternate event to a full status event; it was also rescheduled to September, as the second tournament of the PGA Tour season. Along with an increased prize fund, the change of status meant the winner receives the full benefits of a regular PGA Tour event, with 500 FedEx Cup points and an invitation to The Masters.

Over the years, the Sanderson Farms Championship has been played opposite a number of different tournaments:

Year(s)	Tournament
2014–2018	WGC-HSBC Champions
1994–1998, 2011–2013	The Open Championship
2008, 2010	Ryder Cup
2007	Presidents Cup
2003–2004, 2006	WGC-American Express Championship
1999–2002, 2005	Tour Championship
1969–1993	Masters Tournament
1968	Colonial National Invitation

== Winners ==
Year	Tour (Note: PGAT − PGA Tour.)	Winner	Score	To par	Margin of victory	Runner(s)-up	Purse ($)	Winner's share ($)	Ref.
Sanderson Farms Championship
2025	PGAT	(United States) Steven Fisk	264	−24	2 strokes	(South Africa) Garrick Higgo	6,000,000	1,080,000	
2024	PGAT	(Taiwan) Kevin Yu	265	−23	Playoff	(United States) Beau Hossler	7,600,000	1,368,000	
2023	PGAT	(United States) Luke List	270	−18	Playoff	(Sweden) Ludvig Åberg (United States) Ben Griffin (Sweden) Henrik Norlander (United States) Scott Stallings	8,200,000	1,476,000	
2022	PGAT	(Canada) Mackenzie Hughes	271	−17	Playoff	(Austria) Sepp Straka	7,900,000	1,422,000	
2021	PGAT	(United States) Sam Burns	266	−22	1 stroke	(United States) Nick Watney (United States) Cameron Young	7,000,000	1,260,000	
2020	PGAT	(Spain) Sergio García	269	−19	1 stroke	(United States) Peter Malnati	6,600,000	1,188,000	
2019	PGAT	(Colombia) Sebastián Muñoz	270	−18	Playoff	(South Korea) Im Sung-jae	6,600,000	1,188,000	
2018	PGAT	(United States) Cameron Champ	267	−21	4 strokes	(Canada) Corey Conners	4,400,000	792,000	
2017	PGAT	(United States) Ryan Armour	269	−19	5 strokes	(United States) Chesson Hadley	4,300,000	774,000	
2016	PGAT	(United States) Cody Gribble	268	−20	4 strokes	(United States) Chris Kirk (United States) Luke List (England) Greg Owen	4,200,000	756,000	
2015	PGAT	(United States) Peter Malnati	270	−18	1 stroke	(United States) William McGirt (United States) David Toms	4,100,000	738,000	
2014	PGAT	(Canada) Nick Taylor	272	−16	2 strokes	(United States) Jason Bohn (United States) Boo Weekley	4,000,000	720,000	
2013	PGAT	(United States) Woody Austin	268	−20	Playoff	(United States) Cameron Beckman (United States) Daniel Summerhays	3,000,000	540,000	
True South Classic
2012	PGAT	(United States) Scott Stallings	264	−24	2 strokes	(United States) Jason Bohn	3,000,000	540,000	
Viking Classic
2011	PGAT	(United States) Chris Kirk	266	−22	1 stroke	(United States) George McNeill (United States) Tom Pernice Jr.	3,600,000	648,000	
2010	PGAT	(United States) Bill Haas	273	−15	3 strokes	(United States) Michael Allen	3,600,000	648,000	
2009	PGAT	Canceled due to rain							
2008	PGAT	(United States) Will MacKenzie	269	−19	Playoff	(United States) Brian Gay (United States) Marc Turnesa	3,600,000	648,000	
2007	PGAT	(United States) Chad Campbell	275	−13	1 stroke	(United States) Johnson Wagner	3,500,000	630,000	
Southern Farm Bureau Classic
2006	PGAT	(United States) D. J. Trahan	275	−13	Playoff	(United States) Joe Durant	3,000,000	540,000	
2005	PGAT	(United States) Heath Slocum	267	−21	2 strokes	(Sweden) Carl Pettersson (United States) Loren Roberts	3,000,000	540,000	
2004	PGAT	(United States) Fred Funk (2)	266	−22	1 stroke	(United States) Ryan Palmer	3,000,000	540,000	
2003	PGAT	(United States) John Huston	268	−20	1 stroke	(South Africa) Brenden Pappas	3,000,000	540,000	
2002	PGAT	(England) Luke Donald	201 (Note: Shortened to 54 holes due to weather.)	−15	1 stroke	(South Africa) Deane Pappas	2,600,000	468,000	
2001	PGAT	(United States) Cameron Beckman	269	−19	1 stroke	(United States) Chad Campbell	2,400,000	432,000	
2000	PGAT	(United States) Steve Lowery	266	−22	Playoff	(United States) Skip Kendall	2,200,000	396,000	
1999	PGAT	(United States) Brian Henninger (2)	202 (Note: Shortened to 54 holes because the PGA Tour suspended all play October 29 as a result of Payne Stewart's funeral.)	−14	3 strokes	(United States) Chris DiMarco	2,000,000	360,000	
Deposit Guaranty Golf Classic
1998	PGAT	(United States) Fred Funk	270	−18	2 strokes	(United States) Paul Goydos (United States) Franklin Langham (United States) Tim Loustalot	1,200,000	216,000	
1997	PGAT	(United States) Billy Ray Brown	271	−17	1 stroke	(United States) Mike Standly	1,000,000	180,000	
1996	PGAT	(United States) Willie Wood	268	−20	1 stroke	(United States) Kirk Triplett	1,000,000	180,000	
1995	PGAT	(United States) Ed Dougherty	272	−16	2 strokes	(United States) Gil Morgan	700,000	126,000	
1994	PGAT	(United States) Brian Henninger	135 (Note: Shortened to 36 holes due to weather.)	−9	Playoff	(United States) Mike Sullivan	700,000	126,000	
1993		(United States) Greg Kraft	267	−13	1 stroke	(United States) Morris Hatalsky (United States) Tad Rhyan	300,000	54,000	
1992		(Canada) Richard Zokol	267	−13	1 stroke	(United States) Mike Donald (United States) Bob Eastwood (United States) Mike Nicolette (United States) Greg Twiggs	300,000	54,000	
1991		(United States) Larry Silveira	266	−14	Playoff	(United States) Russ Cochran (United States) Mike Nicolette	300,000	54,000	
1990		(United States) Gene Sauers	268	−12	2 strokes	(United States) Jack Ferenz	300,000	54,000	
1989		(United States) Jim Booros	199	−11	Playoff	(United States) Mike Donald	200,000	36,000	
1988		(United States) Frank Conner	267	−13	5 strokes	(United States) Brian Mogg	200,000	36,000	
1987		(United States) David Ogrin	267	−13	1 stroke	(England) Nick Faldo	200,000	36,000	
1986		(Canada) Dan Halldorson	263	−17	2 strokes	(United States) Paul Azinger	200,000	36,000	
Magnolia Classic
1985		(United States) Jim Gallagher Jr.	131	−9	Playoff	(United States) Paul Azinger	150,000	27,500	
1984		(United States) Lance Ten Broeck	201	−9	Playoff	(United States) Mike Smith	150,000	27,000	
1983		(United States) Russ Cochran	203	−7	2 strokes	(United States) Sammy Rachels	150,000	27,000	
1982		(United States) Payne Stewart	270	−10	3 strokes	(United States) Jay Cudd (United States) Bruce Douglass	75,000	13,500	
1981		(United States) Tom Jones	268	−12	Playoff	(United States) Mike Smith	75,000	13,500	
1980		(United States) Roger Maltbie	65 (Note: Shortened to 18 holes due to weather.)	−5	1 stroke	(United States) Lee Carter	25,000 (Note: Only half the original purse was paid due to weather-shortened tournament.)	4,500	
1979		(United States) Bobby Walzel	272	−8	Playoff	(United States) Buddy Gardner	50,000	9,000	
1978		(United States) Craig Stadler	268	−12	1 stroke	(United States) Bob Eastwood (United States) Bruce Fleisher	35,000	7,000	
1977		(United States) Mike McCullough	269	−11	3 strokes	(United States) Gary Groh (United States) Orville Moody	35,000	7,000	
1976		(United States) Dennis Meyer	271	−9	2 strokes	(United States) Artie McNickle (United States) Tom Purtzer	35,000	7,000	
1975		(United States) Bob Wynn	270	−10	2 strokes	(United States) Mike Morley	35,000	7,000	
1974		(United States) Dwight Nevil (2)	133	−7	2 strokes	(United States) Bunky Henry (United States) Gil Morgan	17,500	3,500	
1973		(United States) Dwight Nevil	268	−12	3 strokes	(United States) Bert Greene	35,000	7,000	
1972		(United States) Mike Morley	269	−11	3 strokes	(United States) Rick Rhodes	35,000	7,000	
1971		(United States) Roy Pace	270	−10	1 stroke	(United States) Jack Lewis Jr.	35,000	7,000	
1970		(United States) Chris Blocker	271	−9	1 stroke	(United States) Roy Pace (Netherlands) Martin Roesink	35,000	5,000	
1969		(United States) Larry Mowry	272	−8	1 stroke	(United States) Larry Hinson (United States) Alvin Odom	35,000	5,000	
1968		(United States) Mac McLendon	269	−11	Playoff	(United States) Pete Fleming	20,000	2,800	

== Multiple winners ==
Three men have won this tournament twice:

- Dwight Nevil: 1973, 1974
- Brian Henninger: 1994, 1999
- Fred Funk: 1998, 2004

== See also ==
- Mississippi Sports Hall of Fame & Museum ("Viking Classic Exhibit")
