= Mike Hulbert =

American professional golfer and sportscaster

Personal information
- Full name: Michael Patrick Hulbert
- Nickname: Hubby
- Nationality: United States
- Born: April 14, 1958 (age 68) Elmira, New York, U.S.
- Height: 6 ft 0 in (1.83 m)
- Weight: 175 lb (79 kg; 12.5 st)

Career
- Sport: Golf
- College: East Tennessee State University
- Turned professional: 1981
- Current tour: Champions Tour
- Former tour: PGA Tour
- Professional wins: 6
- Highest ranking: 55 (November 17, 1991)

Number of wins by tour
- PGA Tour: 3

Best results in major championships
- Masters Tournament: T19: 1992
- PGA Championship: T23: 1991
- U.S. Open: T6: 1992
- The Open Championship: T39: 1990

Michael Patrick Hulbert (born April 14, 1958) is an American professional golfer and sportscaster.

== Early life and amateur career ==
Hulbert was born in Elmira, New York. He grew up in Horseheads, New York, and was a childhood friend and high school golf rival of fellow PGA Tour player Joey Sindelar. He also has a brother named John, a club professional who once qualified for the U.S. Open.

Hulbert attended East Tennessee State University in Johnson City, Tennessee; he earned All-American honors as a member of the golf team in 1979 and 1980.

== Professional career ==
In 1981, Hulbert turned professional. In 1985, he joined the PGA Tour after his success at 1984 PGA Tour Qualifying School graduates.

Hulbert won three times on the PGA Tour; his last two wins came in playoffs. His first win came at the Federal Express St. Jude Classic in 1986 by one stroke over Joey Sindelar. His second victory was at the 1989 B.C. Open in a playoff over Bob Estes. In his third win at the 1991 Anheuser-Busch Golf Classic, he defeated Kenny Knox on the first hole in a playoff. Hulbert's best finishes in major championships were a T-6 at the 1992 U.S. Open, and a T-7 at the 1986 PGA Championship. He has had more than 45 top-10 finishes in his PGA Tour career including more than a half-dozen 2nd or 3rd-place finishes.

Hulbert had a knack for the Plantation Course at the Kapalua International, an event he won in 1991, and finished 2nd to Davis Love III in 1992.

Hulbert caddied for Davis Love III at the AT&T Pebble Beach National Pro-Am and the Northern Trust Open in the early part of 2008 prior to starting play on the Champions Tour. He began playing on the Champions Tour in April 2008. He finished T8 in his debut event, the Outback Steakhouse Pro-Am, and matched it a year later at the Dick's Sporting Goods Open.

Hulbert has had more than 4.7 million dollars in career earnings.

== Personal life ==
Hulbert lives in Orlando, Florida with his wife and two sons.

== Awards and honors ==
In 2002, Hulbert was inducted into the East Tennessee State University Athletic Hall of Fame.

== Professional wins (6) ==
=== PGA Tour wins (3) ===
No.	Date	Tournament	Winning score	Margin of victory	Runner-up
1	Aug 31, 1986	Federal Express St. Jude Classic	−8 (71-72-68-69=280)	1 stroke	(United States) Joey Sindelar
2	Sep 10, 1989	B.C. Open	−16 (69-66-68-65=268)	Playoff	(United States) Bob Estes
3	Jun 23, 1991	Anheuser-Busch Golf Classic	−18 (66-67-65-68=266)	Playoff	(United States) Kenny Knox

PGA Tour playoff record (2–0)

No.	Year	Tournament	Opponent	Result
1	1989	B.C. Open	(United States) Bob Estes	Won with par on first extra hole
2	1991	Anheuser-Busch Golf Classic	(United States) Kenny Knox	Won with par on first extra hole

=== Other wins (3) ===
No.	Date	Tournament	Winning score	Margin of victory	Runner(s)-up
1	Dec 13, 1987	Chrysler Team Championship (with (United States) Bob Tway)	−38 (61-59-64-66=250)	1 stroke	(United States) Fred Couples and (United States) Mike Donald
2	Nov 16, 1991	Isuzu Kapalua International	−16 (67-69-72-68=276)	Playoff	(United States) Davis Love III
3	Dec 8, 1996	JCPenney Classic (with (United States) Donna Andrews)	−16 (63-66-68=197) (Note: Shortened to 54 holes due to weather.)	1 stroke	(United States) Joel Edwards and (United States) Missie McGeorge, (United States) Kelli Kuehne and (United States) Tiger Woods

Other playoff record (1–1)

No.	Year	Tournament	Opponent(s)	Result
1	1988	Chrysler Team Championship (with (United States) Bob Tway)	(United States) George Burns and (United States) Wayne Levi	Lost to birdie on first extra hole
2	1991	Isuzu Kapalua International	(United States) Davis Love III	Won with birdie on first extra hole

== Results in major championships ==
Tournament	1986	1987	1988	1989
Masters Tournament		48		
U.S. Open	CUT	CUT	CUT	
The Open Championship				
PGA Championship	T7	CUT	CUT	T27

Tournament	1990	1991	1992	1993	1994	1995	1996	1997	1998	1999	2000	2001
Masters Tournament	T45		T19	CUT								
U.S. Open	T29		T6	T62	CUT	T28		T68				CUT
The Open Championship	T39											
PGA Championship	T49	T23	T28	T31		CUT	CUT	CUT				

Top 10
Did not play

CUT = missed the half-way cut
"T" = tied

=== Summary ===
Tournament	Wins	2nd	3rd	Top-5	Top-10	Top-25	Events	Cuts made
Masters Tournament	0	0	0	0	0	1	4	3
U.S. Open	0	0	0	0	1	1	10	5
The Open Championship	0	0	0	0	0	0	1	1
PGA Championship	0	0	0	0	1	2	11	6
Totals	0	0	0	0	2	4	26	15

- Most consecutive cuts made – 9 (1989 PGA – 1992 PGA)
- Longest streak of top-10s – 1 (twice)

== See also ==
- 1984 PGA Tour Qualifying School graduates
- 1985 PGA Tour Qualifying School graduates
