= Mike Donald =

American professional golfer (born 1955)

Personal information
- Full name: Michael William Donald
- Nationality: United States
- Born: July 11, 1955 (age 71) Grand Rapids, Michigan, U.S.
- Height: 5 ft 11 in (1.80 m)
- Weight: 185 lb (84 kg; 13.2 st)

Career
- Sport: Golf
- College: Broward Community College; Georgia Southern University
- Turned professional: 1978
- Former tours: PGA Tour; Champions Tour
- Professional wins: 3
- Highest ranking: 77 (July 29, 1990)

Number of wins by tour
- PGA Tour: 1
- Other: 2

Best results in major championships
- Masters Tournament: 47th: 1990
- PGA Championship: T47: 1986
- U.S. Open: 2nd: 1990
- The Open Championship: DNP

Michael William Donald (born July 11, 1955) is an American professional golfer.

== Early life and amateur career ==
Donald was born in Grand Rapids, Michigan. He won 1974 National Junior College Athletic Association (NJCAA) title while playing at Broward Community College and also attended Georgia Southern University.

== Professional career ==
Donald's sole win on the PGA Tour was the 1989 Anheuser-Busch Golf Classic. He lost on the first playoff hole in sudden-death to Hale Irwin at the 1990 U.S. Open in Medinah, Illinois, after they had both finished the 18-hole playoff in 74. Donald missed a 15-foot par putt on the 18th hole of the Monday playoff which would have given him victory.

In the 1990 Masters Tournament Donald tied the record for the lowest opening round score in the history of the tournament, shooting an 8-under-par 64 to equal the lowest first round at Augusta by Lloyd Mangrum in 1940. Donald described his 64 at Augusta as "the round of my life" but followed it up with a second round of 82. He finished the tournament in 47th place.

In 2005, Donald turned 50 and joined the Champions Tour. His best finish on this tour was a T-24 at the 2008 FedEx Kinko's Classic.

== Professional wins (3) ==
=== PGA Tour wins (1) ===
| No. | Date | Tournament | Winning score | Margin of victory | Runners-up |
|---|---|---|---|---|---|
| 1 | Jul 16, 1989 | Anheuser-Busch Golf Classic | −16 (67-66-70-65=268) | Playoff | (United States) Tim Simpson, (United States) Hal Sutton |

PGA Tour playoff record (1–1)

| No. | Year | Tournament | Opponent(s) | Result |
|---|---|---|---|---|
| 1 | 1989 | Anheuser-Busch Golf Classic | (United States) Tim Simpson, (United States) Hal Sutton | Won with birdie on fourth extra hole Sutton eliminated by par on third hole |
| 2 | 1990 | U.S. Open | (United States) Hale Irwin | Lost to birdie on first extra hole after 18-hole playoff; Irwin: +2 (74), Donald: +2 (74) |

=== Other wins (2) ===
| No. | Date | Tournament | Winning score | Margin of victory | Runners-up |
|---|---|---|---|---|---|
| 1 | Dec 9, 1984 | JCPenney Mixed Team Classic (with (United States) Vicki Alvarez) | −18 (69-69-64-68=270) | 1 stroke | (United States) Lori Garbacz and (United States) Craig Stadler, (United States) Nancy Lopez and (United States) Curtis Strange |
| 2 | Dec 9, 1990 | Sazale Classic (with (United States) Fred Couples) | −34 (65-60-63-66=254) | 4 strokes | (United States) Curt Byrum and (United States) Tom Byrum |

Other playoff record (0–1)

| No. | Year | Tournament | Opponent | Result |
|---|---|---|---|---|
| 1 | 1989 | Deposit Guaranty Golf Classic | (United States) Jim Booros | Lost to par on fourth extra hole |

== Results in major championships ==
| Tournament | 1981 | 1982 | 1983 | 1984 | 1985 | 1986 | 1987 | 1988 | 1989 | 1990 | 1991 | 1992 | 1993 |
|---|---|---|---|---|---|---|---|---|---|---|---|---|---|
| Masters Tournament | | | | | | | | | | 47 | CUT | | |
| U.S. Open | | | | T34 | | | CUT | | CUT | 2 | CUT | | T33 |
| PGA Championship | CUT | | T67 | T48 | T62 | T47 | | CUT | CUT | CUT | | | |

Note: Donald never played in The Open Championship.

Top 10
Did not play

CUT = missed the half-way cut
"T" indicates a tie for a place

== See also ==
- Fall 1979 PGA Tour Qualifying School graduates
