= Jim Booros =

American professional golfer (born 1951)

Personal information
- Full name: James Daniel Booros
- Nationality: United States
- Born: April 22, 1951 (age 75) Reading, Pennsylvania, U.S.
- Height: 6 ft 1 in (1.85 m)
- Weight: 215 lb (98 kg; 15.4 st)
- Spouse: Deborah Lynn Booros

Career
- Sport: Golf
- College: Edinboro University
- Turned professional: 1973
- Former tour: PGA Tour
- Professional wins: 3

Best results in major championships
- Masters Tournament: DNP
- PGA Championship: CUT: 1982
- U.S. Open: T68: 1983
- The Open Championship: DNP

James Daniel Booros (born April 22, 1951) is an American professional golfer who played full-time on the PGA Tour for nine years.

== Professional career ==
Booros played in about 250 events between 1977 and 1991 finishing in the top-125 on the money list five times. He won the 1989 Deposit Guaranty Golf Classic before that became an official PGA Tour event. His best finish in a major championship was a T-68 at the 1983 U.S. Open.

== Awards and honors ==
- In 2004, Booros was inducted into the Lehigh Valley Golf Hall of Fame.

== Professional wins (3) ==
- 1989 Deposit Guaranty Golf Classic
- 1996 Pennsylvania PGA Championship, Philadelphia Open Championship

== See also ==
- Fall 1976 PGA Tour Qualifying School graduates
- Fall 1980 PGA Tour Qualifying School graduates
- 1987 PGA Tour Qualifying School graduates
- 1988 PGA Tour Qualifying School graduates
