= Kapalua International =

The Kapalua International was an unofficial PGA Tour event from 1982 to 1997. It was played after the end of the regular PGA Tour season. It was played at the Kapalua Golf Club in Kapalua, Hawaii. The Mercedes Championships moved to the site in January 1999.

== Winners ==
Year	Winner	Country	Runner(s)-up
Lincoln-Mercury Kapalua International
1997	Davis Love III	United States	(United States) David Toms
1996	Paul Stankowski	United States	(United States) Fred Couples
1995	Jim Furyk	United States	(United States) Russ Cochran, (England) Barry Lane, (United States) Jim McGovern
1994	Fred Couples	United States	(United States) Bob Gilder
1993	Fred Couples	United States	(United States) Blaine McCallister
Kapalua International
1992	Davis Love III	United States	(United States) Mike Hulbert
Isuzu Kapalua International
1991	Mike Hulbert	United States	(United States) Davis Love III
1990	David Peoples	United States	(United States) Davis Love III
1989	Peter Jacobsen	United States	(United States) Steve Pate
1988	Bob Gilder	United States	(United States) John Mahaffey
1987	Andy Bean	United States	(United States) Lanny Wadkins
1986	Andy Bean	United States	(United States) Davis Love III
1985	Mark O'Meara	United States	(United States) Corey Pavin
Kapalua International
1984	Sandy Lyle	Scotland	(West Germany) Bernhard Langer
1983	Greg Norman	Australia	(United States) Ben Crenshaw, (United States) Scott Simpson, (United States) Lanny Wadkins
Kapalua Open
1982	David Ishii	United States	(United States) John Mahaffey
