= JCPenney Classic =

Golf tournament in the US

The JCPenney Classic was a mixed team golf tournament sponsored by the PGA Tour and the LPGA Tour. Teams consisted of one PGA Tour player and one LPGA Tour player (except in 1967 when the teams were male only). It was played in California and Florida. Corporate sponsors were Haig & Haig, Pepsi-Cola, and JCPenney.

In 2000, the tournament was replaced by the Valspar Championship.

== Tournament hosts ==
Years	Course	Location
1960–64	Pinecrest Lakes Country Club	Avon Park, Florida
1960–64	Harder Hall	Sebring, Florida
1965–67	La Costa Country Club	Carlsbad, California
1976	Doral Country Club	Doral, Florida
1977–89	Bardmoor Country Club	Largo, Florida
1990–99	Innisbrook Resort	Palm Harbor, Florida

== Winners ==
JCPenney Classic

- 1999 John Daly and Laura Davies
- 1998 Steve Pate and Meg Mallon
- 1997 Clarence Rose and Amy Fruhwirth
- 1996 Mike Hulbert and Donna Andrews
- 1995 Davis Love III and Beth Daniel
- 1994 Brad Bryant and Marta Figueras-Dotti
- 1993 Mike Springer and Melissa McNamara
- 1992 Dan Forsman and Dottie Mochrie
- 1991 Billy Andrade and Kris Tschetter
- 1990 Davis Love III and Beth Daniel
- 1989 Bill Glasson and Pat Bradley
- 1988 John Huston and Amy Benz
- 1987 Steve Jones and Jane Crafter
- 1986 Tom Purtzer and Juli Inkster
- 1985 Larry Rinker and Laurie Rinker

JCPenney Mixed Team Classic

- 1984 Mike Donald and Vicki Alvarez
- 1983 Fred Couples and Jan Stephenson
- 1982 John Mahaffey and JoAnne Carner
- 1981 Tom Kite and Beth Daniel
- 1980 Curtis Strange and Nancy Lopez
- 1979 Dave Eichelberger and Murle Breer
- 1978 Lon Hinkle and Pat Bradley

Pepsi-Cola Mixed Team Championship

- 1977 Jerry Pate and Hollis Stacy
- 1976 Chi-Chi Rodríguez and Jo Ann Washam
- 1968–75 No tournament

Haig & Haig Scotch Foursome

- 1967 Laurie Hammer and Dave Stockton (all male teams)
- 1966 Jack Rule, Jr. and Sandra Spuzich
- 1965 Gardner Dickinson and Ruth Jessen
- 1964 Sam Snead and Shirley Englehorn
- 1963 Dave Ragan and Mickey Wright
- 1962 Mason Rudolph and Kathy Whitworth
- 1961 Dave Ragan and Mickey Wright
- 1960 Jim Turnesa and Gloria Armstrong
