= 1997 PGA Tour =

Golf tour season

1997 PGA Tour season
- Duration: January 9, 1997 – November 2, 1997
- Number of official events: 45
- Most wins: (United States) Tiger Woods (4)
- Money list: (United States) Tiger Woods
- PGA Tour Player of the Year: (United States) Tiger Woods
- PGA Player of the Year: (United States) Tiger Woods
- Rookie of the Year: (United States) Stewart Cink

The 1997 PGA Tour was the 82nd season of the PGA Tour, the main professional golf tour in the United States. It was also the 29th season since separating from the PGA of America.

== Schedule ==
The following table lists official events during the 1997 season.

Date	Tournament	Location	Purse (US$)	Winner (Note: The number in parentheses after each winner's name is the number of PGA Tour events they had won up to and including that tournament. This information is only shown for PGA Tour members.)	OWGR points	Notes
Jan 12	Mercedes Championships	California	1,200,000	(United States) Tiger Woods (3)	40	Winners-only event
Jan 19	Bob Hope Chrysler Classic	California	1,500,000	(United States) John Cook (9)	48	Pro-Am
Jan 26	Phoenix Open	Arizona	1,500,000	(United States) Steve Jones (6)	54	
Feb 2	AT&T Pebble Beach National Pro-Am	California	1,900,000	(United States) Mark O'Meara (13)	60	Pro-Am
Feb 9	Buick Invitational	California	1,500,000	(United States) Mark O'Meara (14)	48	
Feb 16	United Airlines Hawaiian Open	Hawaii	1,200,000	(United States) Paul Stankowski (2)	44	
Feb 23	Tucson Chrysler Classic	Arizona	1,300,000	(United States) Jeff Sluman (2)	44	
Mar 2	Nissan Open	California	1,400,000	(England) Nick Faldo (9)	56	
Mar 9	Doral-Ryder Open	Florida	1,800,000	(Australia) Steve Elkington (7)	68	
Mar 16	Honda Classic	Florida	1,500,000	(Australia) Stuart Appleby (1)	48	
Mar 23	Bay Hill Invitational	Florida	1,500,000	(United States) Phil Mickelson (10)	68	Invitational
Mar 30	The Players Championship	Florida	3,500,000	(Australia) Steve Elkington (8)	80	Flagship event
Apr 6	Freeport-McDermott Classic	Louisiana	1,500,000	(United States) Brad Faxon (4)	48	
Apr 13	Masters Tournament	Georgia	2,700,000	(United States) Tiger Woods (4)	100	Major championship
Apr 20	MCI Classic	South Carolina	1,500,000	(Zimbabwe) Nick Price (16)	62	Invitational
Apr 27	Greater Greensboro Chrysler Classic	North Carolina	1,900,000	(New Zealand) Frank Nobilo (1)	50	
May 4	Shell Houston Open	Texas	1,600,000	(United States) Phil Blackmar (3)	46	
May 11	BellSouth Classic	Georgia	1,500,000	(United States) Scott McCarron (2)	44	
May 18	GTE Byron Nelson Golf Classic	Texas	1,800,000	(United States) Tiger Woods (5)	56	
May 25	MasterCard Colonial	Texas	1,600,000	(South Africa) David Frost (10)	58	Invitational
Jun 2	Memorial Tournament	Ohio	1,900,000	(Fiji) Vijay Singh (4)	50	Invitational
Jun 8	Kemper Open	Maryland	1,500,000	(United States) Justin Leonard (2)	62	
Jun 15	U.S. Open	Maryland	2,600,000	(South Africa) Ernie Els (4)	100	Major championship
Jun 22	Buick Classic	New York	1,500,000	(South Africa) Ernie Els (5)	48	
Jun 29	FedEx St. Jude Classic	Tennessee	1,500,000	(Australia) Greg Norman (19)	42	
Jul 6	Motorola Western Open	Illinois	2,000,000	(United States) Tiger Woods (6)	56	
Jul 13	Quad City Classic	Illinois	1,350,000	(United States) David Toms (1)	24	
Jul 20	The Open Championship	Scotland	£1,600,000	(United States) Justin Leonard (3)	100	Major championship
Jul 20	Deposit Guaranty Golf Classic	Mississippi	1,000,000	(United States) Billy Ray Brown (3)	20	Alternate event
Jul 27	Canon Greater Hartford Open	Connecticut	1,500,000	(United States) Stewart Cink (1)	40	
Aug 3	Sprint International	Colorado	1,700,000	(United States) Phil Mickelson (11)	58	
Aug 10	Buick Open	Michigan	1,500,000	(Fiji) Vijay Singh (5)	54	
Aug 17	PGA Championship	New York	2,600,000	(United States) Davis Love III (11)	100	Major championship
Aug 24	NEC World Series of Golf	Ohio	2,200,000	(Australia) Greg Norman (20)	64	Limited-field event
Aug 24	Greater Vancouver Open	Canada	1,500,000	(United States) Mark Calcavecchia (9)	26	Alternate event
Aug 31	Greater Milwaukee Open	Wisconsin	1,300,000	(United States) Scott Hoch (8)	32	
Sep 7	Bell Canadian Open	Canada	1,500,000	(United States) Steve Jones (7)	50	
Sep 14	CVS Charity Classic	Massachusetts	1,200,000	(United States) Loren Roberts (5)	38	
Sep 21	LaCantera Texas Open	Texas	1,400,000	(United States) Tim Herron (2)	40	
Sep 28	B.C. Open	New York	1,300,000	(Sweden) Gabriel Hjertstedt (1)	24	
Oct 5	Buick Challenge	Georgia	1,200,000	(United States) Davis Love III (12)	42	
Oct 12	Michelob Championship at Kingsmill	Virginia	1,550,000	(United States) David Duval (1)	44	
Oct 19	Walt Disney World/Oldsmobile Classic	Florida	1,500,000	(United States) David Duval (2)	44	
Oct 26	Las Vegas Invitational	Nevada	1,800,000	(United States) Bill Glasson (7)	48	
Nov 2	The Tour Championship	Texas	4,000,000	(United States) David Duval (3)	62	Tour Championship

=== Unofficial events ===
The following events were sanctioned by the PGA Tour, but did not carry official money, nor were wins official.

Date	Tournament	Location	Purse ($)	Winner(s)	OWGR points	Notes
Jan 5	Andersen Consulting World Championship of Golf	Arizona	3,650,000	(Australia) Greg Norman	58	Limited-field event
Sep 28	Ryder Cup	Spain	n/a	Team Europe	n/a	Team event
Nov 9	Lincoln-Mercury Kapalua International	Hawaii	1,200,000	(United States) Davis Love III	36	
Nov 9	Subaru Sarazen World Open	Georgia	2,000,000	(United States) Mark Calcavecchia	40	
Nov 16	Franklin Templeton Shark Shootout	California	1,100,000	(United States) Bruce Lietzke and (United States) Scott McCarron	n/a	Team event
Nov 18	MasterCard PGA Grand Slam of Golf	Hawaii	1,000,000	(South Africa) Ernie Els	n/a	Limited-field event
Nov 23	World Cup of Golf	South Carolina	1,300,000	(Republic of Ireland) Pádraig Harrington and (Republic of Ireland) Paul McGinley	n/a	Team event
Nov 23	World Cup of Golf Individual Trophy	South Carolina	200,000	(Scotland) Colin Montgomerie	n/a	
Nov 30	Skins Game	California	600,000	(United States) Tom Lehman	n/a	Limited-field event
Dec 7	JCPenney Classic	Florida	1,500,000	(United States) Amy Fruhwirth and (United States) Clarence Rose	n/a	Team event
Dec 14	Diners Club Matches	California	700,000	(Australia) Steve Elkington and (United States) Jeff Maggert	n/a	Team event

== Money list ==
The money list was based on prize money won during the season, calculated in U.S. dollars.

Position	Player	Prize money ($)
1	(United States) Tiger Woods	2,066,833
2	(United States) David Duval	1,885,308
3	(United States) Davis Love III	1,635,953
4	(United States) Jim Furyk	1,619,480
5	(United States) Justin Leonard	1,587,531
6	(United States) Scott Hoch	1,393,788
7	(Australia) Greg Norman	1,345,856
8	(Australia) Steve Elkington	1,320,411
9	(South Africa) Ernie Els	1,243,008
10	(United States) Brad Faxon	1,233,505

== Awards ==
Award	Winner	Ref.
PGA Tour Player of the Year (Jack Nicklaus Trophy)	(United States) Tiger Woods	
PGA Player of the Year	(United States) Tiger Woods	
Rookie of the Year	(United States) Stewart Cink	
Scoring leader (PGA Tour – Byron Nelson Award)	(Zimbabwe) Nick Price	
Scoring leader (PGA – Vardon Trophy)	(Zimbabwe) Nick Price	
Comeback Player of the Year	(United States) Bill Glasson	

== See also ==
- 1997 Nike Tour
- 1997 Senior PGA Tour
