= 2002 Masters Tournament =

American golf tournament held in 2002

- Front cover of the 2002 Masters Journal

Tournament information
- Dates: April 11–14, 2002
- Location: Augusta, Georgia; 33.503°N 82.020°W
- Course: Augusta National Golf Club
- Organized by: Augusta National Golf Club
- Tours: PGA Tour; European Tour; Japan Golf Tour

Statistics
- Par: 72
- Length: 7,270 yards (6,648 m)
- Field: 88 players, 45 after cut
- Cut: 147 (+3)
- Prize fund: US$5,600,000
- Winner's share: $1,008,000

Champion
- (United States) Tiger Woods
- 276 (−12)
- Location in the United States Location in Georgia

The 2002 Masters Tournament was the 66th Masters Tournament, held April 11–14 at Augusta National Golf Club. Tiger Woods won his third Masters, and second consecutive, with a score of 276 (−12), three strokes ahead of runner-up Retief Goosen. The course was lengthened by 285 yards (261 m) over the previous year. It was only the third successful defense of a Masters title, previously accomplished in 1966 by Jack Nicklaus and 1990 by Nick Faldo. Rory McIlroy became the fourth person to do this in 2026.

== Course ==
| Hole | Name | Yards | Par | Hole | Name | Yards | Par |
|---|---|---|---|---|---|---|---|
| 1 | Tea Olive | 435 | 4 | 10 | Camellia | 495 | 4 |
| 2 | Pink Dogwood | 575 | 5 | 11 | White Dogwood | 490 | 4 |
| 3 | Flowering Peach | 350 | 4 | 12 | Golden Bell | 155 | 3 |
| 4 | Flowering Crab Apple | 205 | 3 | 13 | Azalea | 510 | 5 |
| 5 | Magnolia | 435 | 4 | 14 | Chinese Fir | 440 | 4 |
| 6 | Juniper | 180 | 3 | 15 | Firethorn | 500 | 5 |
| 7 | Pampas | 410 | 4 | 16 | Redbud | 170 | 3 |
| 8 | Yellow Jasmine | 570 | 5 | 17 | Nandina | 425 | 4 |
| 9 | Carolina Cherry | 460 | 4 | 18 | Holly | 465 | 4 |
| Out | | 3,620 | 36 | In | | 3,650 | 36 |
| Source: | | | | Total | | 7,270 | 72 |

== Field ==
1. Masters champions

Tommy Aaron, Seve Ballesteros, Charles Coody, Fred Couples, Ben Crenshaw, Nick Faldo, Raymond Floyd, Bernhard Langer (10,13,14,16,17), Sandy Lyle, Larry Mize, José María Olazábal (10,16,17), Mark O'Meara (3), Arnold Palmer, Gary Player, Vijay Singh (4,11,14,16,17), Craig Stadler, Tom Watson, Tiger Woods (2,3,4,5,14,16,17), Ian Woosnam (13), Fuzzy Zoeller

- George Archer, Gay Brewer, Jack Burke Jr., Billy Casper, Doug Ford, Bob Goalby, Herman Keiser, Byron Nelson, Jack Nicklaus, and Sam Snead did not play.

2. U.S. Open champions (last five years)

Ernie Els (10,13,14,16,17), Retief Goosen (16,17), Lee Janzen

3. The Open champions (last five years)

David Duval (10,14,16,17), Paul Lawrie, Justin Leonard (14,16,17)

4. PGA champions (last five years)

Davis Love III (11,14,16,17), David Toms (14,16,17)

5. The Players Championship winners (last three years)

Craig Perks

- Hal Sutton (14,16,17) withdrew with a pulled muscle on the first morning of the tournament.

6. U.S. Amateur champion and runner-up

Bubba Dickerson (a), Robert Hamilton (a)

7. The Amateur champion

Michael Hoey (a)

8. U.S. Amateur Public Links champion

Chez Reavie (a)

9. U.S. Mid-Amateur champion

Tim Jackson (a)

10. Top 16 players and ties from the 2001 Masters

Paul Azinger (11,14,16,17), Ángel Cabrera (11,16,17), Mark Calcavecchia (12,14,16,17), Chris DiMarco (14,15,16,17), Brad Faxon (14,15,16,17), Jim Furyk (14,16,17), Toshimitsu Izawa (16,17), Miguel Ángel Jiménez (13), Rocco Mediate (11,14,16,17), Phil Mickelson (11,12,14,16,17), Steve Stricker (14,16), Kirk Triplett (11,14,16,17)

11. Top eight players and ties from the 2001 U.S. Open

Mark Brooks, Stewart Cink (14,16,17), Tom Kite

12. Top four players and ties from 2001 PGA Championship

Shingo Katayama (16,17), Steve Lowery (14,16)

13. Top four players and ties from the 2001 Open Championship

Darren Clarke (16,17), Niclas Fasth (16,17), Billy Mayfair (14)

14. Top 40 players from the 2001 PGA Tour money list

Robert Allenby (16,17), Billy Andrade, José Cóceres (16,17), Joe Durant (16,17), Bob Estes (16,17), Sergio García (16,17), Scott Hoch (16,17), Jerry Kelly (17), Tom Lehman (16,17), Frank Lickliter (16), Shigeki Maruyama, Scott McCarron (17), Jesper Parnevik (16,17), Tom Pernice Jr., Kenny Perry (16,17), Jeff Sluman, Kevin Sutherland (15,17), Scott Verplank (16,17), Mike Weir (16,17)

15. Top 3 players from the 2002 PGA Tour money list on March 10

16. Top 50 players from the final 2001 world ranking

Stuart Appleby, Thomas Bjørn (17), Michael Campbell (17), Pádraig Harrington (17), Charles Howell III (17), Paul McGinley (17), Colin Montgomerie (17), Nick Price (17), Adam Scott, Toru Taniguchi, Lee Westwood (17)

17. Top 50 players from world ranking published March 10

John Daly, Matt Kuchar, Rory Sabbatini

18. Special foreign invitation

Greg Norman

All the amateurs except Tim Jackson were playing in their first Masters, as were Niclas Fasth, Charles Howell III, Jerry Kelly, Paul McGinley, Craig Perks, Adam Scott, Kevin Sutherland, and Toru Taniguchi.

== Round summaries ==
=== First round ===
Thursday, April 11, 2002

Davis Love III, the 1997 PGA Championship winner, rolled out to the first round lead with a five-under 67. Sergio García who had little success prior to this year at the Masters, shot a four-under 68 to place him in a tie for second with Ángel Cabrera. 2001 U.S. Open champion, Retief Goosen, shot a three-under 69 to place him in a tie with Phil Mickelson and Pádraig Harrington for fourth. There was a massive eleven-way tie at -2 for seventh after the first round. Most notably in this group was two-time and defending Masters champion, Tiger Woods. This group saw two other Masters champions in Vijay Singh and José María Olazábal. Four others were in red figures at -1 with Greg Norman headlining that group.

| Place | Player | Score | To par |
|---|---|---|---|
| 1 | (United States) Davis Love III | 67 | −5 |
| T2 | (Argentina) Ángel Cabrera | 68 | −4 |
| T2 | (Spain) Sergio García | 68 | −4 |
| T4 | (South Africa) Retief Goosen | 69 | −3 |
| T4 | (Republic of Ireland) Pádraig Harrington | 69 | −3 |
| T4 | (United States) Phil Mickelson | 69 | −3 |
| T7 | (Northern Ireland) Darren Clarke | 70 | −2 |
| T7 | (United States) Chris DiMarco | 70 | −2 |
| T7 | (South Africa) Ernie Els | 70 | −2 |
| T7 | (Spain) Miguel Ángel Jiménez | 70 | −2 |
| T7 | (United States) Justin Leonard | 70 | −2 |
| T7 | (Spain) José María Olazábal | 70 | −2 |
| T7 | (Sweden) Jesper Parnevik | 70 | −2 |
| T7 | (Zimbabwe) Nick Price | 70 | −2 |
| T7 | (Fiji) Vijay Singh | 70 | −2 |
| T7 | (United States) Scott Verplank | 70 | −2 |
| T7 | (United States) Tiger Woods | 70 | −2 |

=== Second round ===
Friday, April 12, 2002
Saturday, April 13, 2002

Vijay Singh, the 2000 champion, headlined the second round with a dominant, seven-under 65 to bolt up to the top of the leaderboard at −9. The Fijian was not the only impressive player on the day, as four players shot five-under 67s, including Retief Goosen who moved into second at −8 and Ernie Els who moved into third at −7. Three-time Masters champion, Nick Faldo, also was among those who posted a 67. Tiger Woods headlined the five players tied for fourth at −5. Woods shot a three-under 69 to place him four strokes off the lead heading to the weekend. Also in this group was two-time champion José María Olazábal. Phil Mickelson was among the four players tied for ninth at −3. Because of the good deal of low scoring, the cut was set at +3, and Jim Furyk and David Duval headlined the list of notables to fail to make the weekend. Second round play was suspended due to weather and 38 golfers had to complete it Saturday morning.

| Place | Player | Score | To par |
|---|---|---|---|
| 1 | (Fiji) Vijay Singh | 70-65=135 | −9 |
| 2 | (South Africa) Retief Goosen | 69-67=136 | −8 |
| 3 | (South Africa) Ernie Els | 70-67=137 | −7 |
| T4 | (Argentina) Ángel Cabrera | 68-71=139 | −5 |
| T4 | (Spain) Sergio García | 68-71=139 | −5 |
| T4 | (Republic of Ireland) Pádraig Harrington | 69-70=139 | −5 |
| T4 | (Spain) José María Olazábal | 70-69=139 | −5 |
| T4 | (United States) Tiger Woods | 70-69=139 | −5 |
| T9 | (Denmark) Thomas Bjørn | 74-67=141 | −3 |
| T9 | (United States) Chris DiMarco | 70=71=141 | −3 |
| T9 | (Spain) Miguel Ángel Jiménez | 70-71=141 | −3 |
| T9 | (United States) Phil Mickelson | 69-72=141 | −3 |

Amateurs: Hoey (+4), Dickerson (+6), Hamilton (+10), Jackson (+10), Reavie (+16).

=== Third round ===
Saturday, April 13, 2002

The defending champion, Tiger Woods, charged to a tie for the lead with a six-under 66 to move to -11. Woods, looking for his seventh major championship, was 6-0 going into the final round of a major championship with at least a share of the lead. South African Retief Goosen shot a three-under 69 to move from second place at the beginning of the day to a tie with Woods for the 54-hole lead. Vijay Singh shot a disappointing par 72 after his 65 in the second round to remain at -9 and in third place all by himself. Phil Mickelson charged up the leaderboard with a four-under 68 into a tie for fourth with Ernie Els and Sergio García. José María Olazábal shot a one-under 71 to move to -6 and sole ownership of seventh place. Two Europeans (Pádraig Harrington, Thomas Bjørn) sat six shots behind the lead in a tie for eighth at -5. Because the second round had to be completed Saturday morning, third round play began with golfers teeing off from the 1st and 10th holes to ensure the round would be completed by night fall.

| Place | Player | Score | To par |
|---|---|---|---|
| T1 | (South Africa) Retief Goosen | 69-67-69=205 | −11 |
| T1 | (United States) Tiger Woods | 70-69-66=205 | −11 |
| 3 | (Fiji) Vijay Singh | 70-65-72=207 | −9 |
| T4 | (South Africa) Ernie Els | 70-67-72=209 | −7 |
| T4 | (Spain) Sergio García | 68-71-70=209 | −7 |
| T4 | (United States) Phil Mickelson | 69-72-68=209 | −7 |
| 7 | (Spain) José María Olazábal | 70-69-71=210 | −6 |
| T8 | (Denmark) Thomas Bjørn | 74-67-70=211 | −5 |
| T8 | (Republic of Ireland) Pádraig Harrington | 69-70-72=211 | −5 |
| 10 | (Argentina) Ángel Cabrera | 68-71-73=212 | −4 |

=== Final round ===
Sunday, April 14, 2002

==== Summary ====
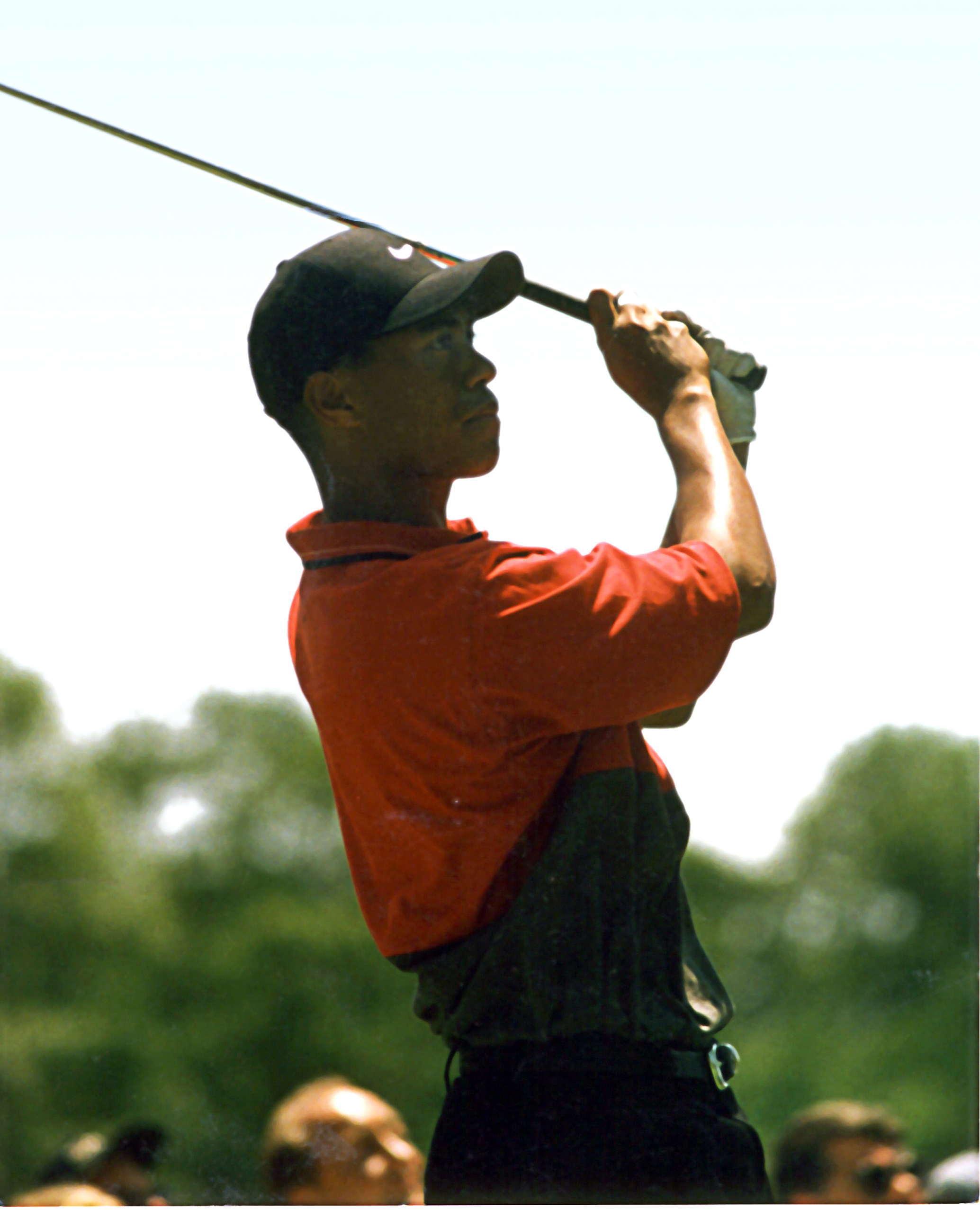
Tiger Woods won his third Masters title

External videos
- Full final round coverage on CBS on YouTube

For the first time since Nick Faldo in 1990, a defending Masters champion successfully defended his title. Tiger Woods captured his third green jacket and seventh overall major championship with a one-under 71 to complete his tournament at -12. This was only the third time in Masters history that a player won back-to-back titles (Jack Nicklaus 1965–66, Faldo 1989–90). Woods set yet another Masters record for the best score by a golfer defending his championship.

Woods was not threatened during the final round as his 54-hole co-leader, Retief Goosen, shot a two-over 74 to fall to -9 and a second-place finish. Phil Mickelson, José María Olazábal, and Pádraig Harrington all shot one-under 71s to finish third, fourth, and tied for fifth respectively. Ernie Els and Vijay Singh spoiled great first and second rounds with scores over par in the final round. Els shot a one-over 73 to tie for fifth, and Singh shot a four-over 76 to finish in seventh. Sergio García had his best Masters finish in eighth place at -4. Overall, the scoring was much more difficult during the final round than it was in the other three rounds. The only score below 70 was by Shigeki Maruyama, who shot a five-under 67 to finish -1 for the tournament and a tie for 14th place.

==== Final leaderboard ====
Champion
(a) = amateur
(c) = past champion

Top 10
| Place | Player | Score | To par | Money (US$) |
|---|---|---|---|---|
| 1 | (United States) Tiger Woods (c) | 70-69-66-71=276 | −12 | 1,008,000 |
| 2 | (South Africa) Retief Goosen | 69-67-69-74=279 | −9 | 604,800 |
| 3 | (United States) Phil Mickelson | 69-72-68-71=280 | −8 | 380,800 |
| 4 | (Spain) José María Olazábal (c) | 70-69-71-71=281 | −7 | 268,800 |
| T5 | (South Africa) Ernie Els | 70-67-72-73=282 | −6 | 212,800 |
| T5 | (Republic of Ireland) Pádraig Harrington | 69-70-72-71=282 | −6 | 212,800 |
| 7 | (Fiji) Vijay Singh (c) | 70-65-72-76=283 | −5 | 187,600 |
| 8 | (Spain) Sergio García | 68-71-70-75=284 | −4 | 173,600 |
| T9 | (Argentina) Ángel Cabrera | 68-71-73-73=285 | −3 | 151,200 |
| T9 | (Spain) Miguel Ángel Jiménez | 70-71-74-70=285 | −3 | 151,200 |
| T9 | (Australia) Adam Scott | 71-72-72-70=285 | −3 | 151,200 |

Leaderboard below the top 10
| Place | Player | Score | To par | Money ($) |
|---|---|---|---|---|
| T12 | (United States) Chris DiMarco | 70-71-72-73=286 | −2 | 123,200 |
| T12 | (United States) Brad Faxon | 71-75-69-71=286 | −2 | 123,200 |
| T14 | (England) Nick Faldo (c) | 75-67-73-72=287 | −1 | 98,000 |
| T14 | (United States) Davis Love III | 67-75-74-71=287 | −1 | 98,000 |
| T14 | (Japan) Shigeki Maruyama | 75-72-73-67=287 | −1 | 98,000 |
| T14 | (Scotland) Colin Montgomerie | 75-71-70-71=287 | −1 | 98,000 |
| T18 | (Denmark) Thomas Bjørn | 74-67-70-77=288 | E | 81,200 |
| T18 | (Republic of Ireland) Paul McGinley | 72-74-71-71=288 | E | 81,200 |
| T20 | (Northern Ireland) Darren Clarke | 70-74-73-72=289 | +1 | 65,240 |
| T20 | (United States) Jerry Kelly | 72-74-71-72=289 | +1 | 65,240 |
| T20 | (United States) Justin Leonard | 70-75-74-70=289 | +1 | 65,240 |
| T20 | (Zimbabwe) Nick Price | 70-76-70-73=289 | +1 | 65,240 |
| T24 | (United States) Mark Brooks | 74-72-71-73=290 | +2 | 46,480 |
| T24 | (United States) Stewart Cink | 74-70-72-74=290 | +2 | 46,480 |
| T24 | (United States) Tom Pernice Jr. | 74-72-71-73=290 | +2 | 46,480 |
| T24 | (United States) Jeff Sluman | 73-72-71-74=290 | +2 | 46,480 |
| T24 | (Canada) Mike Weir | 72-71-71-76=290 | +2 | 46,480 |
| T29 | (Australia) Robert Allenby | 73-70-76-72=291 | +3 | 38,080 |
| T29 | (United States) Charles Howell III | 74-73-71-73=291 | +3 | 38,080 |
| T29 | (Sweden) Jesper Parnevik | 70-72-77-72=291 | +3 | 38,080 |
| T32 | (United States) John Daly | 74-73-70-75=292 | +4 | 32,410 |
| T32 | (Germany) Bernhard Langer (c) | 73-72-73-74=292 | +4 | 32,410 |
| T32 | (United States) Billy Mayfair | 74-71-72-75=292 | +4 | 32,410 |
| T32 | (United States) Craig Stadler (c) | 73-72-76-71=292 | +4 | 32,410 |
| T36 | (United States) Fred Couples (c) | 73-73-76-72=294 | +6 | 26,950 |
| T36 | (United States) Rocco Mediate | 75-68-77-74=294 | +6 | 26,950 |
| T36 | (Australia) Greg Norman | 71-76-72-75=294 | +6 | 26,950 |
| T36 | (United States) David Toms | 73-74-76-71=294 | +6 | 26,950 |
| T40 | (United States) Steve Lowery | 75-71-76-73=295 | +7 | 22,960 |
| T40 | (United States) Kirk Triplett | 74-70-74-77=295 | +7 | 22,960 |
| T40 | (United States) Tom Watson (c) | 71-76-76-72=295 | +7 | 22,960 |
| 43 | (United States) Scott Verplank | 70-75-76-75=296 | +8 | 20,720 |
| 44 | (England) Lee Westwood | 75-72-74-76=297 | +9 | 19,600 |
| 45 | (United States) Bob Estes | 73-72-75-78=298 | +10 | 18,480 |
| CUT | (United States) Paul Azinger | 75-73=148 | +4 | |
| CUT | (New Zealand) Michael Campbell | 74-74=148 | +4 | |
| CUT | (United States) Joe Durant | 74-74=148 | +4 | |
| CUT | (United States) David Duval | 74-74=148 | +4 | |
| CUT | (Northern Ireland) Michael Hoey (a) | 75-73=148 | +4 | |
| CUT | (United States) Tom Lehman | 76-72=148 | +4 | |
| CUT | (United States) Scott McCarron | 75-73=148 | +4 | |
| CUT | (United States) Larry Mize (c) | 74-74=148 | +4 | |
| CUT | (South Africa) Rory Sabbatini | 73-75=148 | +4 | |
| CUT | (United States) Kevin Sutherland | 78-70=148 | +4 | |
| CUT | (United States) Mark Calcavecchia | 79-70=149 | +5 | |
| CUT | (Japan) Toshimitsu Izawa | 73-76=149 | +5 | |
| CUT | (United States) Lee Janzen | 74-75=149 | +5 | |
| CUT | (Scotland) Paul Lawrie | 75-74=149 | +5 | |
| CUT | (United States) Mark O'Meara (c) | 78-71=149 | +5 | |
| CUT | (United States) Billy Andrade | 75-75=150 | +6 | |
| CUT | (United States) Bubba Dickerson (a) | 79-71=150 | +6 | |
| CUT | (United States) Jim Furyk | 73-77=150 | +6 | |
| CUT | (Japan) Shingo Katayama | 78-72=150 | +6 | |
| CUT | (United States) Tom Kite | 77-73=150 | +6 | |
| CUT | (United States) Matt Kuchar | 73-77=150 | +6 | |
| CUT | (United States) Kenny Perry | 76-74=150 | +6 | |
| CUT | (Japan) Toru Taniguchi | 80-70=150 | +6 | |
| CUT | (Sweden) Niclas Fasth | 76-75=151 | +7 | |
| CUT | (United States) Scott Hoch | 76-75=151 | +7 | |
| CUT | (United States) Steve Stricker | 75-76=151 | +7 | |
| CUT | (New Zealand) Craig Perks | 81-71=152 | +8 | |
| CUT | (United States) Fuzzy Zoeller (c) | 75-77=152 | +8 | |
| CUT | (Argentina) José Cóceres | 74-79=153 | +9 | |
| CUT | (United States) Raymond Floyd (c) | 79-74=153 | +9 | |
| CUT | (United States) Robert Hamilton (a) | 77-77=154 | +10 | |
| CUT | (United States) Tim Jackson (a) | 76-78=154 | +10 | |
| CUT | (Scotland) Sandy Lyle (c) | 73-81=154 | +10 | |
| CUT | (Wales) Ian Woosnam (c) | 77-78=155 | +11 | |
| CUT | (Spain) Seve Ballesteros (c) | 75-81=156 | +12 | |
| CUT | (United States) Tommy Aaron (c) | 79-78=157 | +13 | |
| CUT | (United States) Ben Crenshaw (c) | 81-77=158 | +14 | |
| CUT | (South Africa) Gary Player (c) | 80-78=158 | +14 | |
| CUT | (Australia) Stuart Appleby | 80-79=159 | +15 | |
| CUT | (United States) Chez Reavie (a) | 74-86=160 | +16 | |
| CUT | (United States) Charles Coody (c) | 82-84=166 | +22 | |
| CUT | (United States) Arnold Palmer (c) | 89-85=174 | +30 | |
| WD | (United States) Frank Lickliter | 73 | +1 | |

==== Scorecard ====
| Hole | 1 | 2 | 3 | 4 | 5 | 6 | 7 | 8 | 9 | 10 | 11 | 12 | 13 | 14 | 15 | 16 | 17 | 18 |
|---|---|---|---|---|---|---|---|---|---|---|---|---|---|---|---|---|---|---|
| Par | 4 | 5 | 4 | 3 | 4 | 3 | 4 | 5 | 4 | 4 | 4 | 3 | 5 | 4 | 5 | 3 | 4 | 4 |
| (United States) Woods | −11 | −12 | −13 | −13 | −12 | −13 | −13 | −13 | −13 | −13 | −12 | −12 | −12 | −12 | −13 | −13 | −12 | −12 |
| (South Africa) Goosen | −10 | −10 | −10 | −9 | −9 | −9 | −9 | −8 | −8 | −8 | −7 | −7 | −7 | −7 | −8 | −9 | −9 | −9 |
| (United States) Mickelson | −8 | −9 | −8 | −7 | −7 | −8 | −7 | −7 | −7 | −7 | −7 | −7 | −7 | −7 | −8 | −8 | −8 | −8 |
| (Spain) Olazábal | −5 | −6 | −6 | −6 | −6 | −5 | −5 | −5 | −5 | −5 | −5 | −5 | −6 | −6 | −7 | −7 | −7 | −7 |
| (South Africa) Els | −8 | −9 | −9 | −9 | −9 | −9 | −9 | −10 | −9 | −9 | −9 | −9 | −6 | −6 | −6 | −6 | −6 | −6 |
| (Republic of Ireland) Harrington | −5 | −5 | −5 | −5 | −4 | −4 | −5 | −5 | −5 | −4 | −4 | −3 | −4 | −4 | −5 | −5 | −6 | −6 |
| (Fiji) Singh | −9 | −9 | −10 | −10 | −10 | −10 | −10 | −9 | −10 | −10 | −9 | −9 | −9 | −8 | −4 | −5 | −5 | −5 |
| (Spain) Garcia | −6 | −6 | −7 | −6 | −7 | −6 | −6 | −6 | −6 | −6 | −5 | −5 | −5 | −5 | −5 | −5 | −5 | −4 |

Cumulative tournament scores, relative to par

| Birdie | Bogey | Double bogey | Triple bogey+ |

Cumulative tournament scores, relative to par
