= 1997 Masters Tournament =

American golf tournament held in 1997

- Front cover of the 1997 Masters Journal

Tournament information
- Dates: April 10–13, 1997
- Location: Augusta, Georgia; 33.503°N 82.020°W
- Course: Augusta National Golf Club
- Organized by: Augusta National Golf Club
- Tour: PGA Tour

Statistics
- Par: 72
- Length: 6,925 yards (6,332 m)
- Field: 86 players, 46 after cut
- Cut: 149 (+5)
- Prize fund: US$2.7 million
- Winner's share: $486,000

Champion
- (United States) Tiger Woods
- 270 (−18)

Location map
- Location in the United States Location in Georgia

The 1997 Masters Tournament was the 61st Masters Tournament, held April 10–13 at Augusta National Golf Club in Augusta, Georgia.

Tiger Woods won his first major championship, twelve strokes ahead of runner-up Tom Kite. The margin of victory is the largest in the tournament's history. The four-day score of 270 (−18) was also a tournament record until 2020 when it was beaten by Dustin Johnson. Woods also became both the youngest (21) and the first non-White player to win at Augusta.

Woods struggled on his first nine holes of the first round, turning at 4-over-par 40. Making four birdies and an eagle gave him a 6-under-par 30 on the back nine for a 70, three shots behind first-round leader John Huston.

In the second and third rounds, Woods scored the best rounds of each day (66-65) to open up a commanding nine-shot lead. A final-round 69 gave Woods a then tournament record 270 (−18), bettering the previous record of 271 set by Jack Nicklaus in 1965 and matched by Raymond Floyd in 1976.

Woods' victory set television ratings records for golf; the final round broadcast on Sunday was seen by an estimated 44 million viewers in the United States.

== Field ==
1. Masters champions

Tommy Aaron, Seve Ballesteros, Gay Brewer, Billy Casper, Charles Coody, Fred Couples (9,13), Ben Crenshaw, Nick Faldo (3,9,10,12,13), Raymond Floyd, Doug Ford, Bernhard Langer, Sandy Lyle, Larry Mize (9,11), Jack Nicklaus, José María Olazábal, Arnold Palmer, Gary Player, Craig Stadler, Tom Watson (10,12,13), Ian Woosnam, Fuzzy Zoeller

- George Archer, Jack Burke Jr., Bob Goalby, Ben Hogan, Herman Keiser, Cary Middlecoff, Byron Nelson, Henry Picard, Gene Sarazen, Sam Snead, and Art Wall Jr. did not play.

2. U.S. Open champions (last five years)

Ernie Els (9,10,12,13), Lee Janzen (9,10,11), Steve Jones (10,12,13), Tom Kite, Corey Pavin (9,12,13)

3. The Open champions (last five years)

Tom Lehman (9,10,12,13), Greg Norman (9,10,13), Nick Price (4,9,11)

- John Daly did not play.

4. PGA champions (last five years)

Paul Azinger (9), Mark Brooks (10,11,12,13), Steve Elkington (11)

5. U.S. Amateur champion and runner-up

Steve Scott (a)

- Tiger Woods forfeited his invitation by turning professional, but qualified via categories 12 & 13.

6. The Amateur champion

Warren Bladon (a)

7. U.S. Amateur Public Links champion

Tim Hogarth (a)

8. U.S. Mid-Amateur champion

Spider Miller (a)

9. Top 24 players and ties from the 1996 Masters

Mark Calcavecchia (13), David Duval (13), David Frost, Scott Hoch (10,12,13), John Huston, Davis Love III (10,13), Jeff Maggert (13), Scott McCarron, Phil Mickelson (11,12,13), Frank Nobilo (10,11), Mark O'Meara (10,12,13), Loren Roberts (12,13), Bob Tway, Duffy Waldorf (13)

10. Top 16 players and ties from the 1996 U.S. Open

David Berganio Jr., Stewart Cink, John Cook (12,13), Dan Forsman, Jim Furyk (13), Ken Green, Colin Montgomerie, John Morse, Vijay Singh (11,13), Sam Torrance

11. Top eight players and ties from 1996 PGA Championship

Per-Ulrik Johansson, Justin Leonard (12,13), Jesper Parnevik, Kenny Perry (13), Tommy Tolles (13)

12. Winners of PGA Tour events since the previous Masters

Stuart Appleby, Guy Boros, Michael Bradley (13), Brad Faxon (13), Ed Fiori, Fred Funk (13), Dudley Hart, David Ogrin, Clarence Rose, Jeff Sluman (13), Paul Stankowski, Steve Stricker (13), D. A. Weibring, Willie Wood, Tiger Woods (13)

13. Top 30 players from the 1996 PGA Tour money list

14. Special foreign invitation

Robert Allenby, Yoshinori Kaneko, Mark McNulty, Masashi Ozaki, Costantino Rocca, Lee Westwood

== Round summaries ==
=== First round ===
Thursday, April 10, 1997

John Huston shot 67 (−5) to lead by one stroke over Paul Stankowski. Tiger Woods shot a 40 (+4) on the first nine, but came back into the clubhouse on the back nine with a score of 30 (−6) for a 70 (−2).

Place	Player	Score	To par
1	(United States) John Huston	67	−5
2	(United States) Paul Stankowski	68	−4
3	(United States) Paul Azinger	69	−3
4	(United States) Tiger Woods	70	−2
T5	(Italy) Costantino Rocca	71	−1
T5	(Spain) José María Olazábal	71	−1
T5	(Zimbabwe) Nick Price	71	−1
T8	(Australia) Stuart Appleby	72	E
T8	(United States) David Berganio Jr.	72	E
T8	(United States) Fred Couples	72	E
T8	(United States) Lee Janzen	72	E
T8	(Sweden) Per-Ulrik Johansson	72	E
T8	(Germany) Bernhard Langer	72	E
T8	(United States) Davis Love III	72	E
T8	(Scotland) Colin Montgomerie	72	E
T8	(United States) Tommy Tolles	72	E
T8	(United States) Willie Wood	72	E

==== Scorecard ====
Hole	1	2	3	4	5	6	7	8	9	10	11	12	13	14	15	16	17	18
Par	4	5	4	3	4	3	4	5	4	4	4	3	5	4	5	3	4	4
(United States) Woods	+1	+1	+1	+2	+2	+2	+2	+3	+4	+3	+3	+2	+1	+1	−1	−1	−2	−2

=== Second round ===
Friday, April 11, 1997

Woods started the round three strokes back, but a 66 gave him his first lead in a professional major championship, three shots ahead of Colin Montgomerie from Scotland.

Place	Player	Score	To par
1	(United States) Tiger Woods	70-66=136	−8
2	(Scotland) Colin Montgomerie	72-67=139	−5
3	(Italy) Costantino Rocca	71-69=140	−4
T4	(United States) Fred Couples	72-69=141	−3
T4	(Spain) José María Olazábal	71-70=141	−3
T4	(United States) Jeff Sluman	74-67=141	−3
T7	(United States) Paul Azinger	69-73=142	−2
T7	(Zimbabwe) Nick Price	71-71=142	−2
T7	(United States) Paul Stankowski	68-74=142	−2
T10	(South Africa) Ernie Els	73-70=143	−1
T10	(United States) Davis Love III	72-71=143	−1
T10	(United States) Tom Watson	75-68=143	−1

Amateurs: Bladon (+7), Scott (+13), Hogarth (+14), Miller (+19)

==== Scorecard ====
Hole	1	2	3	4	5	6	7	8	9	10	11	12	13	14	15	16	17	18
Par	4	5	4	3	4	3	4	5	4	4	4	3	5	4	5	3	4	4
(United States) Woods	−2	−3	−2	−2	−3	−3	−3	−4	−4	−4	−4	−4	−6	−7	−8	−8	−8	−8

Cumulative tournament scores, relative to par

=== Third round ===
Saturday, April 12, 1997

Woods shot a 65 in the third round for 201 (−15) and his lead increased to nine shots; the closest competitor was Costantino Rocca from Italy. Montgomerie's 74 dropped him into a tie for sixth.

Place	Player	Score	To par
1	(United States) Tiger Woods	70-66-65=201	−15
2	(Italy) Costantino Rocca	71-69-70=210	−6
3	(United States) Paul Stankowski	68-74-69=211	−5
T4	(United States) Tom Kite	77-69-66=212	−4
T4	(United States) Tom Watson	75-68-69=212	−4
T6	(Scotland) Colin Montgomerie	72-67-74=213	−3
T6	(United States) Jeff Sluman	74-67-72=213	−3
8	(United States) Fred Couples	72-69-73=214	−2
9	(Spain) José María Olazábal	71-70-74=215	−1
T10	(United States) Fred Funk	73-74-69=216	E
T10	(United States) Justin Leonard	76-69-71=216	E
T10	(Sweden) Jesper Parnevik	73-72-71=216	E
T10	(United States) Tommy Tolles	72-72-72=216	E

==== Scorecard ====
Hole	1	2	3	4	5	6	7	8	9	10	11	12	13	14	15	16	17	18
Par	4	5	4	3	4	3	4	5	4	4	4	3	5	4	5	3	4	4
(United States) Woods	−8	−9	−9	−9	−10	−10	−11	−12	−12	−12	−13	−13	−13	−13	−14	−14	−14	−15

Cumulative tournament scores, relative to par

=== Final round ===
Sunday, April 13, 1997

==== Summary ====
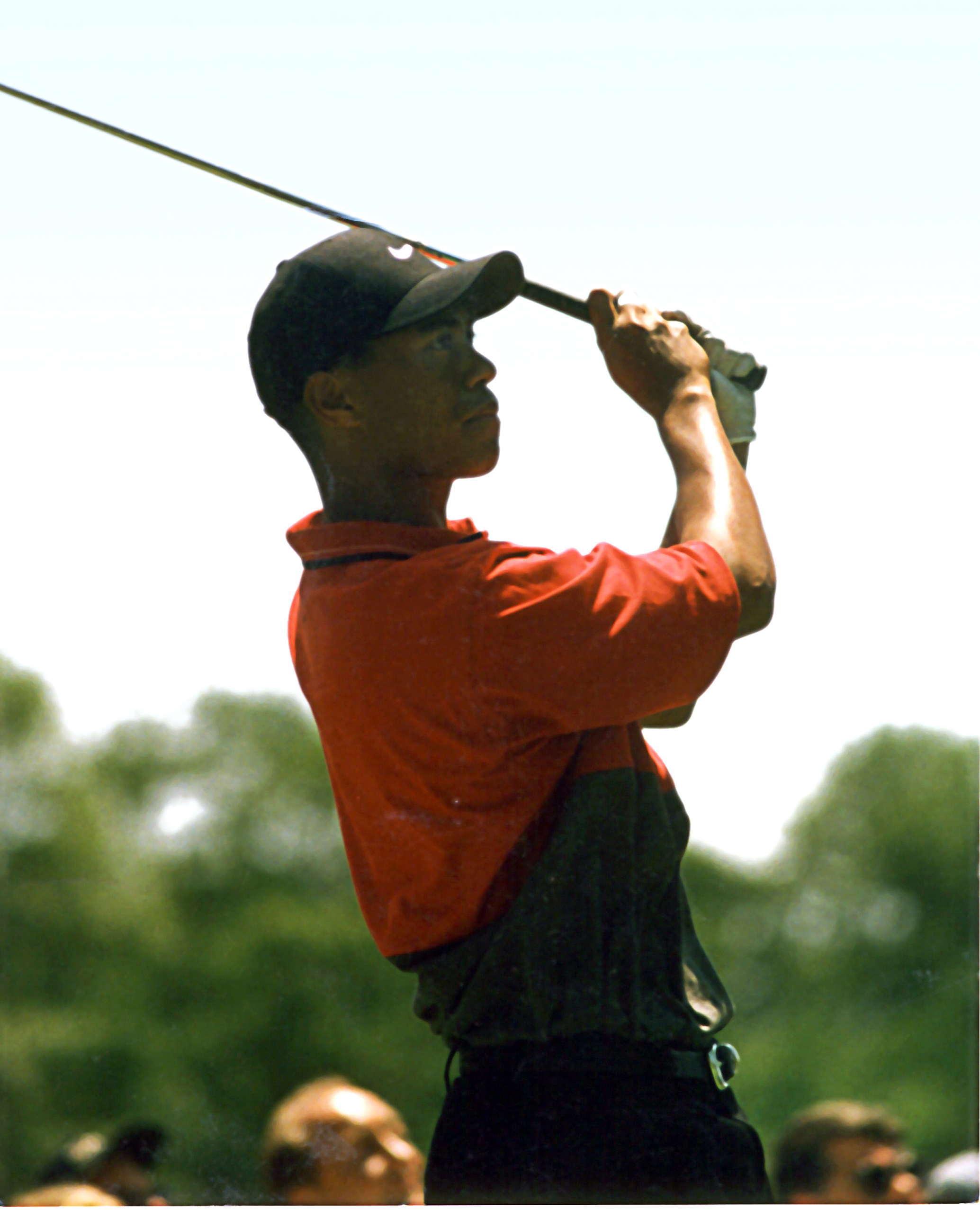
Tiger Woods won his first Masters title

External videos
- Full final round coverage on CBS on YouTube

Woods won his first major championship, finishing 12 strokes ahead runner-up Tom Kite. It was the largest victory margin in Masters history, passing Nicklaus' 9-shot winning margin in 1965, and tied for the second largest victory margin in any major championship, only one stroke behind Old Tom Morris' 13-shot winning margin set at the 1862 Open Championship at Prestwick (a mark Woods later surpassed at the 2000 U.S. Open at Pebble Beach when he won by 15 shots). Rocca and Stankowski fell into a tie for fifth.

==== Final leaderboard ====
Champion
(a) = amateur
(c) = past champion

Top 10
Place	Player	Score	To par	Money (US$)
1	(United States) Tiger Woods	70-66-65-69=270	−18	486,000
2	(United States) Tom Kite	77-69-66-70=282	−6	291,600
3	(United States) Tommy Tolles	72-72-72-67=283	−5	183,600
4	(United States) Tom Watson (c)	75-68-69-72=284	−4	129,600
T5	(Italy) Costantino Rocca	71-69-70-75=285	−3	102,600
T5	(United States) Paul Stankowski	68-74-69-74=285	−3	102,600
T7	(United States) Fred Couples (c)	72-69-73-72=286	−2	78,570
T7	(Germany) Bernhard Langer (c)	72-72-74-68=286	−2	78,570
T7	(United States) Justin Leonard	76-69-71-70=286	−2	78,570
T7	(United States) Davis Love III	72-71-72-71=286	−2	78,570
T7	(United States) Jeff Sluman	74-67-72-73=286	−2	78,570

Leaderboard below the top 10
Place	Player	Score	To par	Money ($)
T12	(Australia) Steve Elkington	76-72-72-67=287	−1	52,920
T12	(Sweden) Per-Ulrik Johansson	72-73-73-69=287	−1	52,920
T12	(United States) Tom Lehman	73-76-69-69=287	−1	52,920
T12	(Spain) José María Olazábal (c)	71-70-74-72=287	−1	52,920
T12	(United States) Willie Wood	72-76-71-68=287	−1	52,920
T17	(United States) Mark Calcavecchia	74-73-72-69=288	E	39,150
T17	(South Africa) Ernie Els	73-70-71-74=288	E	39,150
T17	(United States) Fred Funk	73-74-69-72=288	E	39,150
T17	(Fiji) Vijay Singh	75-74-69-70=288	E	39,150
T21	(Australia) Stuart Appleby	72-76-70-71=289	+1	30,240
T21	(United States) John Huston	67-77-75-70=289	+1	30,240
T21	(Sweden) Jesper Parnevik	73-72-71-73=289	+1	30,240
T24	(Zimbabwe) Nick Price	71-71-75-74=291	+3	24,840
T24	(England) Lee Westwood	77-71-73-70=291	+3	24,840
T26	(United States) Lee Janzen	72-73-74-73=292	+4	21,195
T26	(United States) Craig Stadler (c)	77-72-71-72=292	+4	21,195
T28	(United States) Paul Azinger	69-73-77-74=293	+5	19,575
T28	(United States) Jim Furyk	74-75-72-72=293	+5	19,575
T30	(United States) Scott McCarron	77-71-72-74=294	+6	17,145
T30	(United States) Larry Mize (c)	79-69-74-72=294	+6	17,145
T30	(Scotland) Colin Montgomerie	72-67-74-81=294	+6	17,145
T30	(United States) Mark O'Meara	75-74-70-75=294	+6	17,145
T34	(Scotland) Sandy Lyle (c)	73-73-74-75=295	+7	14,918
T34	(United States) Fuzzy Zoeller (c)	75-73-69-78=295	+7	14,918
36	(United States) Duffy Waldorf	74-75-72-75=296	+8	13,905
37	(South Africa) David Frost	74-71-73-79=297	+9	13,905
38	(United States) Scott Hoch	79-68-73-78=298	+10	12,690
T39	(United States) Jack Nicklaus (c)	77-70-74-78=299	+11	11,610
T39	(Scotland) Sam Torrance	75-73-73-78=299	+11	11,610
T39	(Wales) Ian Woosnam (c)	77-68-75-79=299	+11	11,610
42	(Japan) Masashi Ozaki	74-74-74-78=300	+12	10,530
T43	(United States) Corey Pavin	75-74-78-74=301	+13	9,720
T43	(United States) Clarence Rose	73-75-79-74=301	+13	9,720
45	(United States) Ben Crenshaw (c)	75-73-74-80=302	+14	8,910
46	(New Zealand) Frank Nobilo	76-72-74-81=303	+15	8,370
CUT	(United States) David Berganio Jr.	72-78=150	+6	
CUT	(United States) John Cook	77-73=150	+6	
CUT	(United States) David Duval	78-72=150	+6	
CUT	(United States) Dan Forsman	74-76=150	+6	
CUT	(United States) Phil Mickelson	76-74=150	+6	
CUT	(United States) John Morse	77-73=150	+6	
CUT	(England) Warren Bladon (a)	79-72=151	+7	
CUT	(United States) Brad Faxon	77-74=151	+7	
CUT	(United States) Dudley Hart	74-77=151	+7	
CUT	(Australia) Greg Norman	77-74=151	+7	
CUT	(United States) David Ogrin	77-74=151	+7	
CUT	(United States) Kenny Perry	73-78=151	+7	
CUT	(South Africa) Gary Player (c)	76-75=151	+7	
CUT	(United States) Bob Tway	78-73=151	+7	
CUT	(United States) D. A. Weibring	78-73=151	+7	
CUT	(United States) Stewart Cink	75-78=153	+9	
CUT	(United States) Ed Fiori	78-75=153	+9	
CUT	(United States) Jeff Maggert	77-76=153	+9	
CUT	(Zimbabwe) Mark McNulty	81-72=153	+9	
CUT	(United States) Tommy Aaron (c)	77-77=154	+10	
CUT	(United States) Raymond Floyd (c)	79-75=154	+10	
CUT	(Japan) Yoshinori Kaneko	77-77=154	+10	
CUT	(Spain) Seve Ballesteros (c)	81-74=155	+11	
CUT	(United States) Michael Bradley	79-77=156	+12	
CUT	(England) Nick Faldo (c)	75-81=156	+12	
CUT	(United States) Steve Stricker	77-79=156	+12	
CUT	(United States) Steve Scott (a)	78-79=157	+13	
CUT	(United States) Guy Boros	79-79=158	+14	
CUT	(United States) Tim Hogarth (a)	80-78=158	+14	
CUT	(Australia) Robert Allenby	82-77=159	+15	
CUT	(United States) Mark Brooks	77-82=159	+15	
CUT	(United States) Billy Casper (c)	83-77=160	+16	
CUT	(United States) Charles Coody (c)	83-77=160	+16	
CUT	(United States) Steve Jones	82-78=160	+16	
CUT	(United States) Ken Green	87-74=161	+17	
CUT	(United States) Loren Roberts	85-77=162	+18	
CUT	(United States) Gay Brewer (c)	84-79=163	+19	
CUT	(United States) Spider Miller (a)	82-81=163	+19	
CUT	(United States) Arnold Palmer (c)	89-87=176	+32	
CUT	(United States) Doug Ford (c)	85-94=179	+35	

==== Scorecard ====
Hole	1	2	3	4	5	6	7	8	9	10	11	12	13	14	15	16	17	18
Par	4	5	4	3	4	3	4	5	4	4	4	3	5	4	5	3	4	4
(United States) Woods	−15	−16	−16	−16	−15	−15	−14	−15	−15	−15	−16	−16	−17	−18	−18	−18	−18	−18
(United States) Kite	−4	−5	−5	−4	−4	−3	−4	−5	−5	−5	−5	−5	−6	−6	−5	−5	−6	−6
(United States) Tolles	E	−1	−2	−2	−2	−2	−2	−1	−2	−2	−2	−2	−3	−3	−4	−5	−5	−5
(United States) Watson	−5	−6	−6	−6	−7	−6	−3	−4	−4	−5	−5	−6	−6	−6	−6	−5	−5	−4
(Italy) Rocca	−6	−7	−7	−7	−7	−6	−6	−6	−6	−6	−5	−5	−5	−5	−5	−5	−4	−3
(United States) Stankowski	−5	−4	−3	−2	−2	−2	−3	−3	−2	−3	−2	−2	−2	−3	−3	−3	−3	−3

Cumulative tournament scores, relative to par

Birdie	Bogey	Double bogey	Triple bogey+

== Quotes ==
- "There it is – a win for the ages!" – Jim Nantz's (CBS Sports) call as Woods sunk his final putt on the 18th hole to win the tournament.
