= List of male golfers who have been in the world top 10 =

This is a list of golfers who have appeared in the top 10 of the Official World Golf Ranking (OWGR). The rankings started on 6 April 1986 and are updated each week. As of 15 November 2026, 129 golfers have reached the top 10.

Tiger Woods holds the record for the most weeks in the world top 10, with 906. He is followed by Rory McIlroy with 832 weeks and Ernie Els with 788 weeks. Woods had a record run of 736 consecutive weeks in the top 10 from 13 April 1997 to 15 May 2011, had another run of 124 consecutive weeks from 25 March 2012 to 3 August 2014 and 46 further weeks from 14 April 2019 to 23 February 2020. Greg Norman was in the top 10 for 646 consecutive weeks from the start of the rankings in 1986 until 16 August 1998. Sergio García is the youngest player to reach the top 10, a week after his 20th birthday.

Before the start of the OWGR in 1986, world golf rankings were published in Mark McCormack's World of Professional Golf Annual from 1968 to 1985. These end-of-year rankings had Jack Nicklaus as the number one from 1968 to 1977, Tom Watson from 1978 to 1982 and Seve Ballesteros from 1983 to 1985.

== Current top 10 ==
The table shows the top 10 ranked golfers and their average ranking points as of 15 November 2026, which is the end of week 46.

Rank	Change	Player	Points	Top 10 since	Weeks
1	Steady	(United States) Scottie Scheffler	15.55	13 Feb 2022	249
2	Steady	(Northern Ireland) Rory McIlroy	8.17	17 Oct 2021	266
3	Steady	(England) Matt Fitzpatrick	6.73	22 Mar 2026	35
4	Steady	(United States) Cameron Young	6.64	15 Mar 2026	36
5	Steady	(United States) Wyndham Clark	5.86	21 Jun 2026	22
6	Steady	(Spain) Jon Rahm	4.97	8 Nov 2026	2
7	Steady	(United States) Chris Gotterup	4.86	5 Jul 2026	20
8	Steady	(England) Tommy Fleetwood	4.78	17 Aug 2025	66
9	Steady	(United States) Xander Schauffele	4.77	30 Aug 2026	12
10	Steady	(United States) Sam Burns	4.74	16 Aug 2026	14

Change – change in position since the previous week.
Top 10 since – indicates the date at which the player entered or last re-entered the top 10.
Weeks – current number of consecutive weeks in the top 10.

Since the major revision of the rating method in September 2001, the highest points average as well as the largest lead in points average were set by Tiger Woods on September 16, 2007. After winning the BMW Championship and The Tour Championship in consecutive weeks, he had an average of 24.36 and a lead of 14.73 points over Phil Mickelson.

== Most weeks in the top 10 ==
As of 15 November 2026, 129 players have reached the world top 10 since the rankings started in April 1986. 25 of these have reached number 1 while a further 16 have reached number 2 but never number 1.

Tiger Woods was in the top 10 for 906 weeks. He was number 1 for 683 weeks, number 2 for 107 weeks and number 3 for 27 weeks. Phil Mickelson was never number 1 but was number 2 for 270 weeks.

The current top-10 are in bold.

Player	Weeks	First	Last	Best	First Best	Refs
(United States) Tiger Woods	906	13 Apr 1997	23 Feb 2020	1	15 Jun 1997	
(Northern Ireland) **Rory McIlroy**	832	22 Nov 2009	15 Nov 2026	1	4 Mar 2012	
(South Africa) Ernie Els	788	19 Jun 1994	16 Jan 2011	1	22 Jun 1997	
(United States) Phil Mickelson	775	25 Aug 1996	7 Sep 2014	2	11 Feb 2001	
(Australia) Greg Norman	646	6 Apr 1986	16 Aug 1998	1	14 Sep 1986	
(Fiji) Vijay Singh	544	23 Aug 1998	12 Jul 2009	1	5 Sep 2004	
(England) Nick Faldo	473	31 Jan 1988	6 Jul 1997	1	2 Sep 1990	
(United States) Davis Love III	465	19 Apr 1992	20 Feb 2005	2	19 Jul 1998	
(Spain) Sergio García	453	16 Jan 2000	22 Apr 2018	2	9 Nov 2008	
(Australia) Adam Scott	446	15 Aug 2004	30 Aug 2020	1	18 May 2014	
(United States) Jim Furyk	442	17 Jan 1999	7 Feb 2016	2	10 Sep 2006	
(England) Justin Rose	427	4 Nov 2007	19 Jul 2026	1	9 Sep 2018	
(Germany) Bernhard Langer	406	6 Apr 1986	30 Jun 1996	1	6 Apr 1986	
(United States) Dustin Johnson	405	5 Jun 2011	1 May 2022	1	19 Feb 2017	
(Scotland) Colin Montgomerie	400	15 May 1994	15 Jan 2006	2	17 Mar 1996	
(Zimbabwe) Nick Price	386	16 Aug 1992	6 Jul 2003	1	14 Aug 1994	
(United States) **Xander Schauffele**	356	30 Dec 2018	15 Nov 2026	2	19 May 2024	
(Spain) **Jon Rahm**	355	28 May 2017	15 Nov 2026	1	19 Jul 2020	
(England) Lee Westwood	354	12 Jul 1998	28 Jul 2013	1	31 Oct 2010	
(United States) Justin Thomas	348	15 Jan 2017	1 Feb 2026	1	13 May 2018	
(Wales) Ian Woosnam	338	27 Sep 1987	12 Jun 1994	1	7 Apr 1991	
(Sweden) Henrik Stenson	338	4 Feb 2007	21 Jan 2018	2	25 May 2014	
(Spain) Seve Ballesteros	337	6 Apr 1986	8 Nov 1992	1	27 Apr 1986	
(United States) Fred Couples	322	9 Sep 1990	4 Apr 1999	1	22 Mar 1992	
(Spain) José María Olazábal	314	30 Apr 1989	8 Oct 1995	2	17 Mar 1991	
(Republic of Ireland) Pádraig Harrington	304	11 Nov 2001	4 Apr 2010	3	20 Jul 2008	
(United States) Paul Azinger	292	20 Mar 1988	31 Jul 1994	4	22 Aug 1993	
(South Africa) Retief Goosen	275	28 Oct 2001	24 Jun 2007	3	15 Jan 2006	
(Australia) Jason Day	265	19 Jun 2011	27 Jan 2019	1	20 Sep 2015	
(United States) Steve Stricker	254	26 Aug 2007	19 Jan 2014	2	6 Sep 2009	
(United States) Patrick Cantlay	250	2 Jun 2019	19 Jan 2025	3	23 Jan 2022	
(United States) **Scottie Scheffler**	249	13 Feb 2022	15 Nov 2026	1	27 Mar 2022	
(United States) Payne Stewart	249	1986	14 Nov 1999	3	10 Jun 1990	
(United States) Jordan Spieth	237	13 Apr 2014	9 Jul 2023	1	16 Aug 2015	
(United States) Collin Morikawa	233	9 Aug 2020	23 Aug 2026	2	24 Oct 2021	
(United States) David Duval	232	22 Feb 1998	11 Aug 2002	1	28 Mar 1999	
(United States) Curtis Strange	222	1986	12 May 1991	3	19 Jun 1988	
(England) Luke Donald	220	12 Mar 2006	4 Aug 2013	1	29 May 2011	
(United States) Rickie Fowler	206	14 Sep 2014	26 May 2019	4	24 Jan 2016	
(Japan) Masashi Ozaki	195	8 Oct 1989	26 Apr 1998	5	1 Sep 1996	
(United States) Mark O'Meara	191	6 Apr 1986	9 Jan 2000	2	6 Sep 1998	
(United States) Bubba Watson	186	1 May 2011	8 Jan 2017	2	22 Feb 2015	
(United States) Bryson DeChambeau	179	2 Sep 2018	8 Jun 2025	4	9 May 2021	
(United States) David Toms	179	19 Aug 2001	11 Jun 2006	5	3 Nov 2002	
(United States) Tom Kite	174	12 Mar 1989	6 Feb 1994	5	16 Apr 1989	
(United States) Brooks Koepka	170	18 Jun 2017	17 Oct 2021	1	21 Oct 2018	
(United States) Corey Pavin	167	6 Apr 1986	9 Feb 1997	2	2 Jun 1996	
(Scotland) Sandy Lyle	166	6 Apr 1986	6 Aug 1989	2	10 Apr 1988	
(Norway) Viktor Hovland	155	1 Aug 2021	22 Jun 2025	3	30 Jan 2022	
(United States) Matt Kuchar	142	29 Aug 2010	15 Feb 2015	4	2 Jun 2013	
(Japan) Hideki Matsuyama	136	23 Oct 2016	15 Feb 2026	2	18 Jun 2017	
(Australia) Geoff Ogilvy	123	18 Jun 2006	17 Jan 2010	3	29 Jun 2008	
(United States) Tom Lehman	122	28 Jan 1996	18 Mar 2001	1	20 Apr 1997	
(United States) Hal Sutton	121	6 Apr 1986	17 Jun 2001	4	23 Apr 2000	
(England) Paul Casey	116	5 Apr 2009	20 May 2018	3	24 May 2009	
(England) **Matt Fitzpatrick**	115	19 Jun 2022	15 Nov 2026	3	19 Apr 2026	
(England) **Tommy Fleetwood**	113	4 Mar 2018	15 Nov 2026	3	30 Nov 2025	
(Canada) Mike Weir	111	24 Jun 2001	27 Feb 2005	3	15 Jun 2003	
(Germany) Martin Kaymer	110	24 Jan 2010	1 Mar 2015	1	27 Feb 2011	
(United States) Mark Calcavecchia	109	27 Nov 1988	30 Dec 1990	5	23 Jul 1989	
(United States) **Wyndham Clark**	106	16 Jul 2023	15 Nov 2026	3	21 Apr 2024	
(United States) Webb Simpson	106	23 Oct 2011	16 May 2021	4	5 Jul 2020	
(United States) Kenny Perry	103	15 Jun 2003	3 Jan 2010	4	28 Jun 2009	
(United States) Patrick Reed	90	6 Dec 2015	11 Jul 2021	6	14 Jun 2020	
(United States) Lanny Wadkins	86	1986	5 May 1991	5	1 Mar 1987	
(South Africa) David Frost	86	17 Apr 1988	30 Oct 1994	6	20 Nov 1988	
(Japan) Tsuneyuki Nakajima	85	6 Apr 1986	15 Nov 1987	4	1986	
(United States) Russell Henley	84	9 Mar 2025	1 Nov 2026	3	21 Sep 2025	
(Zimbabwe) Mark McNulty	84	14 Jun 1987	12 Apr 1992	6	18 Oct 1987	
(Australia) Cameron Smith	80	9 Jan 2022	20 Aug 2023	2	17 Jul 2022	
(United States) Ben Crenshaw	80	16 Aug 1987	14 May 1989	5	22 May 1988	
(Sweden) Ludvig Åberg	71	10 Mar 2024	3 Aug 2025	4	16 Jun 2024	
(United States) Max Homa	67	19 Feb 2023	9 Jun 2024	5	2 Apr 2023	
(United States) Brandt Snedeker	64	23 Sep 2012	8 Dec 2013	4	10 Feb 2013	
(South Africa) Louis Oosthuizen	61	9 Sep 2012	26 Dec 2021	4	13 Jan 2013	
(United States) Chris DiMarco	60	10 Feb 2002	2 Apr 2006	6	8 May 2005	
(Italy) Francesco Molinari	60	22 Jul 2018	22 Sep 2019	5	9 Sep 2018	
(Australia) Steve Elkington	58	15 Oct 1995	15 Feb 1998	3	20 Apr 1997	
(Northern Ireland) Graeme McDowell	55	31 Oct 2010	25 Aug 2013	4	16 Jan 2011	
(United States) J. J. Spaun	50	15 Jun 2025	28 Jun 2026	5	5 Apr 2026	
(United States) Jason Dufner	50	27 May 2012	24 Nov 2013	6	16 Sep 2012	
(United States) John Cook	46	23 Aug 1992	25 Jul 1993	7	11 Oct 1992	
(United States) Stewart Cink	45	29 Aug 2004	23 Aug 2009	5	6 Jul 2008	
(England) Tyrrell Hatton	44	11 Oct 2020	2 Mar 2025	5	24 Jan 2021	
(United States) Brian Harman	44	23 Jul 2023	26 May 2024	8	13 Aug 2023	
(United States) Chip Beck	43	24 Apr 1988	29 Oct 1989	8	12 Feb 1989	
(Northern Ireland) Darren Clarke	43	29 Oct 2000	13 Jan 2002	8	22 Jul 2001	
(United States) Will Zalatoris	42	14 Aug 2022	28 May 2023	7	25 Sep 2022	
(South Korea) K. J. Choi	40	26 Aug 2007	29 Jun 2008	5	9 Mar 2008	
(Sweden) Jesper Parnevik	38	23 Jan 2000	8 Apr 2001	7	14 May 2000	
(United States) **Cameron Young**	36	15 Mar 2026	15 Nov 2026	3	22 Mar 2026	
(Colombia) Camilo Villegas	34	28 Sep 2008	24 May 2009	7	28 Sep 2008	
(England) Ian Poulter	33	24 Jan 2010	3 Mar 2013	5	21 Feb 2010	
(Scotland) Robert MacIntyre	32	17 Aug 2025	5 Apr 2026	5	25 Jan 2026	
(United States) Tom Watson	32	6 Apr 1986	1986	4*	6 Apr 1986	
(United States) **Chris Gotterup**	31	8 Feb 2026	15 Nov 2026	5	8 Feb 2026	
(Australia) Rodger Davis	29	19 Jul 1987	26 Jan 1992	7	19 Jul 1987	
(United States) **Sam Burns**	28	2 Jan 2022	15 Nov 2026	7	16 Aug 2026	
(Sweden) Robert Karlsson	27	5 Oct 2008	5 Apr 2009	6	19 Oct 2008	
(United States) Zach Johnson	27	8 Dec 2013	22 Nov 2015	6	12 Jan 2014	
(England) Danny Willett	27	10 Apr 2016	30 Oct 2016	9	10 Apr 2016	
(Sweden) Alex Norén	26	13 Nov 2016	6 Aug 2017	8	28 May 2017	
(United States) Bob Tway	25	28 Dec 1986	14 Jun 1987	5	25 Jan 1987	
(United States) Justin Leonard	24	29 Mar 1998	13 Jun 1999	6	10 May 1998	
(United States) Anthony Kim	22	14 Sep 2008	23 May 2010	6	28 Sep 2008	
(South Africa) Rory Sabbatini	21	9 Sep 2007	30 Mar 2008	8	23 Sep 2007	
(United States) Calvin Peete	20	6 Apr 1986	1986	8*	1986	
(South Africa) Charl Schwartzel	20	22 May 2011	1 Apr 2012	6	11 Mar 2012	
(United States) Andy Bean	19	1986	1 Mar 1987	5*	1986	
(United States) Hunter Mahan	19	26 Feb 2012	15 Jul 2012	4	1 Apr 2012	
(United States) Tony Finau	17	2 Dec 2018	24 Oct 2021	9	2 Dec 2018	
(United States) Harris English	16	18 Jul 2021	5 Oct 2025	7	3 Aug 2025	
(Japan) Isao Aoki	16	8 Mar 1987	19 Jul 1987	8	7 Jun 1987	
(Austria) Sepp Straka	14	11 May 2025	8 Mar 2026	7	1 Jun 2025	
(United States) Ben Griffin	14	9 Nov 2025	8 Feb 2026	8	21 Dec 2025	
(Australia) Stuart Appleby	12	22 Feb 2004	9 May 2004	8	21 Mar 2004	
(England) David Howell	10	28 May 2006	13 Aug 2006	9	11 Jun 2006	
(United States) Keegan Bradley	9	24 Mar 2013	3 Aug 2025	7	22 Jun 2025	
(United States) Hale Irwin	8	19 May 1991	11 Aug 1991	7	19 May 1991	
(United States) Nick Watney	8	3 Jul 2011	27 Nov 2011	9	31 Jul 2011	
(United States) Larry Mize	7	28 June 1987	9 Aug 1987	10	28 June 1987	
(Australia) Ian Baker-Finch	6	29 Sep 1991	24 Nov 1991	10	29 Sep 1991	
(South Africa) Branden Grace	6	14 Feb 2016	7 Aug 2016	10	14 Feb 2016	
(United States) Maverick McNealy	5	6 Apr 2025	4 May 2025	10	6 Apr 2025	
(United States) Chad Campbell	4	21 Mar 2004	6 Jun 2004	9	23 May 2004	
(Argentina) Ángel Cabrera	3	25 Sep 2005	20 Nov 2005	9	2 Oct 2005	
(United States) Jimmy Walker	2	29 Mar 2015	5 Apr 2015	10	29 Mar 2015	
(Denmark) Thomas Bjørn	1	15 Jul 2001	15 Jul 2001	10	15 Jul 2001	
(Republic of Ireland) Shane Lowry	1	11 May 2025	11 May 2025	10	11 May 2025	

Weeks – total number of weeks in the top 10. First – date the player first reached the top 10. Last – last week the player was in the top 10. Best – highest position reached by the player. First Best – date the player was first at this highest position.

- No rankings were produced for the 12 weeks from 22 March 2020 to 7 June 2020 inclusive.
- * The available data for 1986 is incomplete and this number may be incorrect. The number given is the player's highest known position.
- Payne Stewart died on Monday 25 October 1999 at which time he was ranked 8th in the world. He remained on the rankings until 14 November, when he was still ranked 8, at which time he was removed from the rankings.

== Youngest and oldest players ==
The tables below list the five youngest players to enter the top 10 and the oldest five to still be there.

Player	First	Age
(Spain) Sergio García	16 Jan 2000	20 years, 7 days
(Northern Ireland) Rory McIlroy	22 Nov 2009	20 years, 202 days
(United States) Jordan Spieth	13 Apr 2014	20 years, 256 days
(United States) Tiger Woods	13 Apr 1997	21 years, 104 days
(Spain) Jon Rahm	28 May 2017	22 years, 199 days

Player	Last	Age
(Japan) Masashi Ozaki	26 Apr 1998	51 years, 92 days
(United States) Kenny Perry	3 Jan 2010	49 years, 146 days
(United States) Steve Stricker	19 Jan 2014	46 years, 330 days
(Zimbabwe) Nick Price	6 Jul 2003	46 years, 159 days
(Fiji) Vijay Singh	12 Jul 2009	46 years, 140 days

The following table lists the youngest to reach a specific position in the top 10.

Player	Pos	First	Age
(Spain) Sergio García	10	16 Jan 2000	20 years, 7 days
(Northern Ireland) Rory McIlroy	9	13 Dec 2009	20 years, 223 days
(United States) Jordan Spieth	8	11 May 2014	20 years, 284 days
(United States) Jordan Spieth	7	20 Apr 2014	20 years, 263 days
(Spain) Sergio García	6	15 Jul 2001	21 years, 187 days
(United States) Tiger Woods	5	20 Apr 1997	21 years, 111 days
(United States) Jordan Spieth	4	29 Mar 2015	21 years, 241 days
(United States) Tiger Woods	3	13 Apr 1997	21 years, 104 days
(United States) Tiger Woods	2	25 May 1997	21 years, 146 days
(United States) Tiger Woods	1	15 Jun 1997	21 years, 167 days

- Tiger Woods entered the top 10 at number 3, dropped to 5th for four weeks and was then never lower than 3rd for nearly 14 years.

== Most consecutive weeks in the top 10 ==
Instances of 250 weeks or more are given.

*	Current streak as of 22 November 2026

Player	Weeks	First	Last
(United States) Tiger Woods	736	13 Apr 1997	15 May 2011
(Australia) Greg Norman	646	6 Apr 1986	16 Aug 1998
(England) Nick Faldo	406	19 Jun 1988	24 Mar 1996
(United States) Phil Mickelson	402	8 Feb 2004	16 Oct 2011
(Scotland) Colin Montgomerie	374	15 May 1994	8 Jul 2001
(Fiji) Vijay Singh	356	12 Nov 2000	2 Sep 2007
(United States) Dustin Johnson	355 (Note: The rankings were frozen during the COVID-19 pandemic. Rankings were produced on 15 March 2020 and restarted on 14 June 2020. No rankings were produced for the 12 weeks from 22 March 2020 to 7 June 2020 inclusive.)	8 Mar 2015	13 Mar 2022
(South Africa) Ernie Els	301	19 Jun 1994	19 Mar 2000
(United States) Justin Thomas	281	13 Aug 2017	19 Mar 2023
(Northern Ireland) Rory McIlroy*	267	17 Oct 2021	22 Nov 2026
(Germany) Bernhard Langer	267	26 May 1991	30 Jun 1996
(Wales) Ian Woosnam	265	21 May 1989	12 Jun 1994
(Spain) Seve Ballesteros	260	6 Apr 1986	24 Mar 1991
(Spain) Jon Rahm	255	7 Jul 2019	11 Aug 2024
(United States) Scottie Scheffler*	250	13 Feb 2022	22 Nov 2026

== Longest gaps between appearances in the top 10 ==
Instances of 200 weeks or more are given.

Player	Weeks	App	Next
(United States) Hal Sutton	641	7 Jun 1987	19 Sep 1999
(United States) Keegan Bradley	608 (Note: The rankings were frozen during the COVID-19 pandemic. Rankings were produced on 15 March 2020 and restarted on 14 June 2020. No rankings were produced for the 12 weeks between these dates.)	4 Aug 2013	22 Jun 2025
(South Africa) Louis Oosthuizen	407	7 Jul 2013	18 Jul 2021
(England) Lee Westwood	378	5 Aug 2001	2 Nov 2008
(United States) Webb Simpson	374	2 Dec 2012	2 Feb 2020
(England) Paul Casey	362	12 Jun 2011	20 May 2018
(United States) Corey Pavin	346	19 Apr 1987	5 Dec 1993
(United States) Payne Stewart	298	10 Oct 1993	27 Jun 1999
(United States) Mark O'Meara	284	4 Jan 1987	14 Jun 1992
(England) Justin Rose	275	9 Feb 2020	10 Aug 2025
(United States) Tiger Woods	245	3 Aug 2014	14 Apr 2019
(South Africa) David Frost	234	26 Mar 1989	19 Sep 1993
(England) Tommy Fleetwood	226	15 Mar 2020	8 Oct 2024
(Spain) Sergio García	211	6 Dec 2009	22 Dec 2013
(United States) Mark O'Meara	207	14 Jun 1992	2 Jun 1996
(United States) Harris English	205	15 Aug 2021	20 Jul 2025

== Number two in the rankings but never number one ==
16 players have reached world No. 2 in the official rankings, but have never risen to world No. 1.

Player	First	Last	Weeks	Ref
(Scotland) Sandy Lyle	10 Apr 1988	11 Sep 1988	23	
(Spain) José María Olazábal	17 Mar 1991	5 Apr 1992	35	
(Scotland) Colin Montgomerie	17 Mar 1996	20 Oct 1996	24	
(United States) Corey Pavin	2 Jun 1996	2 Jun 1996	1	
(United States) Davis Love III	19 Jul 1998	16 May 1999	5	
(United States) Mark O'Meara	6 Sep 1998	17 Jan 1999	15	
(United States) Phil Mickelson	11 Feb 2001	18 Aug 2013	270	
(United States) Jim Furyk	10 Sep 2006	26 Aug 2007	39	
(Spain) Sergio García	9 Nov 2008	8 Mar 2009	18	
(United States) Steve Stricker	6 Sep 2009	4 Apr 2010	12	
(Sweden) Henrik Stenson	25 May 2014	5 Apr 2015	24	
(United States) Bubba Watson	22 Feb 2015	15 Mar 2015	4	
(Japan) Hideki Matsuyama	18 Jun 2017	20 Aug 2017	7	
(United States) Collin Morikawa	24 Oct 2021	17 Apr 2022	24	
(Australia) Cameron Smith	17 Jul 2022	9 Oct 2022	9	
(United States) Xander Schauffele	19 May 2024	23 Feb 2025	36	

First – first week the player reached number 2, Last – last week the player was at number 2, Weeks – total weeks at number 2.

== Annual totals ==
The tables below list the number of weeks during each year that players were in the top 10, arranged by decade. In the "First" and "Last" columns, "+2000s" indicates that the player was also in the top 10 in an earlier or later decade.

=== 1980s ===
29 players were in the top 10 from the start of the rankings in April 1986 to the end of 1989.
Seve Ballesteros and Greg Norman were in the top 10 throughout this period.

Player	86	87	88	89	Total	First	Last
(Australia) Greg Norman	39	52	53	52	196	6 Apr 1986	+1990s
(Spain) Seve Ballesteros	39	52	53	52	196	6 Apr 1986	+1990s
(United States) Curtis Strange	35	33	53	52	173	1986	+1990s
(Scotland) Sandy Lyle	37	45	53	31	166	6 Apr 1986	6 Aug 1989
(Germany) Bernhard Langer	39	52	40		131	6 Apr 1986	+1990s
(Wales) Ian Woosnam		14	52	40	106	27 Sep 1987	+1990s
(United States) Payne Stewart	12	52	15	21	100	1986	+1990s
(England) Nick Faldo			39	52	91	31 Jan 1988	+1990s
(Japan) Tsuneyuki Nakajima	39	46			85	6 Apr 1986	15 Nov 1987
(United States) Lanny Wadkins	8	42	33		83	1986	+1990s
(United States) Ben Crenshaw		9	53	18	80	16 Aug 1987	14 May 1989
(United States) Paul Azinger			35	26	61	20 Mar 1988	+1990s
(United States) Hal Sutton	36	22			58	6 Apr 1986	+2000s
(United States) Mark Calcavecchia			6	51	57	27 Nov 1988	+1990s
(United States) Tom Kite				43	43	12 Mar 1989	+1990s
(United States) Chip Beck			10	33	43	24 Apr 1988	29 Oct 1989
(United States) Mark O'Meara	39	1			40	6 Apr 1986	+2000s
(Spain) José María Olazábal				36	36	30 Apr 1989	+1990s
(South Africa) David Frost			23	11	34	17 Apr 1988	+1990s
(United States) Tom Watson	32				32	6 Apr 1986	1986
(Zimbabwe) Mark McNulty		18	10		28	14 Jun 1987	+1990s
(United States) Bob Tway	1	24			25	28 Dec 1986	14 Jun 1987
(United States) Calvin Peete	20				20	6 Apr 1986	1986
(United States) Andy Bean	10	9			19	1986	1 Mar 1987
(United States) Corey Pavin	4	14			18	6 Apr 1986	+1990s
(Australia) Rodger Davis		12	5		17	19 Jul 1987	+1990s
(Japan) Isao Aoki		16			16	8 Mar 1987	19 Jul 1987
(United States) Larry Mize		7			7	21 Jun 1987	2 Aug 1987
(Japan) Masashi Ozaki				2	2	8 Oct 1989	+1990s

=== 1990s ===
36 players were in the top 10 during the 1990s.
Greg Norman was in the top 10 for the first 450 weeks of the 1990s.

Player	90	91	92	93	94	95	96	97	98	99	Total	First	Last
(Australia) Greg Norman	52	52	52	52	53	52	52	52	33		450	+1980s	16 Aug 1998
(England) Nick Faldo	52	52	52	52	53	52	51	18			382	+1980s	6 Jul 1997
(Zimbabwe) Nick Price			19	52	53	52	33	46	50	53	358	16 Aug 1992	+2000s
(United States) Fred Couples	5	34	52	52	53	52	43	13	15	3	322	9 Sep 1990	4 Apr 1999
(Scotland) Colin Montgomerie					34	52	52	52	52	53	295	15 May 1994	+2000s
(South Africa) Ernie Els					29	52	52	52	52	53	290	19 Jun 1994	+2010s
(Spain) José María Olazábal	52	52	52	42	40	40					278	+1980s	8 Oct 1995
(Germany) Bernhard Langer		40	52	52	53	52	26				275	+1980s	30 Jun 1996
(Wales) Ian Woosnam	52	52	52	52	24						232	+1980s	12 Jun 1994
(United States) Paul Azinger	52	52	50	46	31						231	+1980s	31 Jul 1994
(United States) Davis Love III			29	24	4		13	30	52	53	205	19 Apr 1992	+2000s
(Japan) Masashi Ozaki				8	13	52	52	52	16		193	+1980s	26 Apr 1998
(United States) Mark O'Meara			1				21	50	31	47	150	+1980s	+2000s
(United States) Payne Stewart	52	52	23	1						21	149	+1980s	14 Nov 1999
(United States) Corey Pavin				4	41	52	47	5			149	+1980s	9 Feb 1997
(United States) Tiger Woods								38	52	53	143	13 Apr 1997	+2020s
(Spain) Seve Ballesteros	52	46	43								141	+1980s	8 Nov 1992
(United States) Tom Kite	52	17	9	47	6						131	+1980s	6 Feb 1994
(United States) Phil Mickelson							19	40	48	14	121	25 Aug 1996	+2010s
(United States) Tom Lehman							35	52	19		106	28 Jan 1996	+2000s
(United States) David Duval									43	53	96	22 Feb 1998	+2000s
(England) Lee Westwood									25	53	78	12 Jul 1998	+2010s
(Fiji) Vijay Singh									15	53	68	23 Aug 1998	+2000s
(Australia) Steve Elkington						12	24	20	2		58	15 Oct 1995	15 Feb 1998
(Zimbabwe) Mark McNulty	10	34	12								56	+1980s	12 Apr 1992
(United States) Mark Calcavecchia	52										52	+1980s	30 Dec 1990
(South Africa) David Frost				9	43						52	+1980s	30 Oct 1994
(United States) Curtis Strange	37	12									49	+1980s	12 May 1991
(United States) John Cook			19	27							46	23 Aug 1992	25 Jul 1993
(United States) Justin Leonard									15	9	24	29 Mar 1998	13 Jun 1999
(Australia) Rodger Davis		8	4								12	+1980s	26 Jan 1992
(United States) Jim Furyk										11	11	17 Jan 1999	+2010s
(United States) Hale Irwin		8									8	19 May 1991	11 Aug 1991
(Australia) Ian Baker-Finch		6									6	29 Sep 1991	24 Nov 1991
(United States) Lanny Wadkins		3									3	+1980s	5 May 1991
(United States) Hal Sutton										1	1	+1980s	+2000s

=== 2000s ===
41 players were in the top 10 during the 2000s.
Tiger Woods was in the top 10 throughout the 2000s.

Player	00	01	02	03	04	05	06	07	08	09	Total	First	Last
(United States) Tiger Woods	52	52	52	52	52	53	52	52	52	52	521	+1990s	+2020s
(United States) Phil Mickelson	41	52	52	34	47	53	52	52	52	52	487	+1990s	+2010s
(Fiji) Vijay Singh	50	52	52	52	52	53	52	44	41	28	476	+1990s	12 Jul 2009
(South Africa) Ernie Els	50	52	52	52	52	53	52	52	51	2	468	+1990s	+2010s
(Spain) Sergio García	1	33	52	12	21	53	49	12	33	49	315	16 Jan 2000	+2010s
(Republic of Ireland) Pádraig Harrington		7	32	52	45	31	7	43	33	41	291	11 Nov 2001	+2010s
(United States) Jim Furyk	9	5	18	40	36	25	52	52	29	23	289	+1990s	+2010s
(South Africa) Retief Goosen		5	52	39	51	53	52	23			275	28 Oct 2001	24 Jun 2007
(United States) Davis Love III	52	52	44	52	52	8					260	+1990s	20 Feb 2005
(Australia) Adam Scott					9	46	51	52	31		189	15 Aug 2004	+2020s
(United States) David Toms		20	52	52	9	24	22				179	19 Aug 2001	11 Jun 2006
(United States) David Duval	52	52	32								136	+1990s	11 Aug 2002
(Australia) Geoff Ogilvy							25	33	23	40	121	18 Jun 2006	+2010s
(Canada) Mike Weir		3	2	45	52	9					111	24 Jun 2001	27 Feb 2005
(England) Lee Westwood	50	31							9	17	107	+1990s	+2010s
(United States) Kenny Perry				27	11	17				47	102	15 Jun 2003	+2010s
(Scotland) Colin Montgomerie	52	37	7	2		5	2				105	+1990s	15 Jan 2006
(Sweden) Henrik Stenson								29	18	50	97	4 Feb 2007	+2010s
(United States) Steve Stricker								19	38	31	88	26 Aug 2007	+2010s
(United States) Hal Sutton	42	20									62	+1980s	17 Jun 2001
(United States) Chris DiMarco			14	5		32	9				60	10 Feb 2002	2 Apr 2006
(England) Luke Donald							33	21			54	12 Mar 2006	+2010s
(United States) Stewart Cink					15	12			12	6	45	29 Aug 2004	23 Aug 2009
(Northern Ireland) Darren Clarke	4	37	2								43	29 Oct 2000	13 Jan 2002
(South Korea) K. J. Choi								17	23		40	26 Aug 2007	29 Jun 2008
(England) Paul Casey										39	39	5 Apr 2009	+2010s
(Sweden) Jesper Parnevik	37	1									38	23 Jan 2000	8 Apr 2001
(England) Justin Rose								9	25		34	4 Nov 2007	+2020s
(Colombia) Camilo Villegas									14	20	34	28 Sep 2008	24 May 2009
(Zimbabwe) Nick Price	19		5	4							28	+1990s	6 Jul 2003
(Sweden) Robert Karlsson									13	14	27	5 Oct 2008	5 Apr 2009
(South Africa) Rory Sabbatini								10	11		21	9 Sep 2007	30 Mar 2008
(United States) Tom Lehman	8	8									16	+1990s	18 Mar 2001
(United States) Anthony Kim									12	4	16	14 Sep 2008	+2010s
(Australia) Stuart Appleby					12						12	22 Feb 2004	9 May 2004
(England) David Howell							10				10	28 May 2006	13 Aug 2006
(Northern Ireland) Rory McIlroy										5	5	22 Nov 2009	+2020s
(United States) Chad Campbell					4						4	21 Mar 2004	6 Jun 2004
(Argentina) Ángel Cabrera						3					3	25 Sep 2005	20 Nov 2005
(United States) Mark O'Meara	1										1	+1980s	9 Jan 2000
(Denmark) Thomas Bjørn		1									1	15 Jul 2001	15 Jul 2001

=== 2010s ===
50 players were in the top 10 in the 2010s.

Player	10	11	12	13	14	15	16	17	18	19	Total	First	Last
(Northern Ireland) Rory McIlroy	42	51	52	52	50	52	53	51	47	52	502	+2000s	+2020s
(England) Justin Rose			41	52	50	50	31	17	52	52	345	+2000s	+2020s
(United States) Dustin Johnson		27	10		7	43	53	52	52	52	296	5 Jun 2011	+2020s
(Australia) Jason Day		29	11	2	49	52	53	42	26	1	265	19 Jun 2011	27 Jan 2019
(Australia) Adam Scott		22	34	52	52	19	45	18			242	+2000s	+2020s
(Sweden) Henrik Stenson	8			21	52	52	53	52	3		241	+2000s	21 Jan 2018
(United States) Tiger Woods	52	20	41	52	31					38	234	+1990s	+2020s
(United States) Jordan Spieth					18	52	53	52	41		216	13 Apr 2014	+2020s
(United States) Rickie Fowler					16	37	43	42	51	17	206	14 Sep 2014	26 May 2019
(United States) Bubba Watson		1	34	7	38	52	53	1			186	1 May 2011	8 Jan 2017
(England) Lee Westwood	52	53	52	12							169	+1990s	28 Jul 2013
(United States) Phil Mickelson	52	42	8	42	23						167	+1990s	7 Sep 2014
(United States) Steve Stricker	52	53	26	32	3						166	+2000s	19 Jan 2014
(England) Luke Donald	30	53	52	31							166	+2000s	4 Aug 2013
(United States) Jim Furyk	52	8			24	52	6				142	+1990s	7 Feb 2016
(United States) Matt Kuchar	5	36	13	42	42	4					142	29 Aug 2010	15 Feb 2015
(United States) Justin Thomas								36	52	52	140	15 Jan 2017	+2020s
(Spain) Sergio García				2	51	38	2	35	10		138	+2000s	22 Apr 2018
(Spain) Jon Rahm								29	52	40	121	28 May 2017	+2020s
(United States) Brooks Koepka								17	49	52	118	18 Jun 2017	+2020s
(Germany) Martin Kaymer	35	53	20			2					110	24 Jan 2010	1 Mar 2015
(Japan) Hideki Matsuyama							11	52	23		86	23 Oct 2016	+2020s
(England) Paul Casey	52	24							1		77	+2000s	20 May 2018
(United States) Brandt Snedeker			15	49							64	23 Sep 2012	8 Dec 2013
(United States) Bryson DeChambeau									18	42	60	2 Sep 2018	+2020s
(Italy) Francesco Molinari									24	36	60	22 Jul 2018	22 Sep 2019
(Northern Ireland) Graeme McDowell	8	28		19							55	31 Oct 2010	25 Aug 2013
(United States) Webb Simpson		11	39								50	23 Oct 2011	+2020s
(United States) Jason Dufner			32	18							50	27 May 2012	24 Nov 2013
(United States) Xander Schauffele									1	45	46	30 Dec 2018	+2020s
(United States) Patrick Reed						4	33	6	2		45	6 Dec 2015	+2020s
(South Africa) Louis Oosthuizen			10	27							37	9 Sep 2012	+2020s
(England) Ian Poulter	29	2		2							33	24 Jan 2010	3 Mar 2013
(United States) Patrick Cantlay										31	31	2 Jun 2019	+2020s
(South Africa) Ernie Els	29	1									30	+1990s	16 Jan 2011
(United States) Zach Johnson				4	14	9					27	8 Dec 2013	22 Nov 2015
(England) Danny Willett							27				27	10 Apr 2016	30 Oct 2016
(Sweden) Alex Norén							8	18			26	13 Nov 2016	6 Aug 2017
(South Africa) Charl Schwartzel		9	11								20	22 May 2011	1 Apr 2012
(United States) Hunter Mahan			19								19	26 Feb 2012	15 Jul 2012
(England) Tommy Fleetwood									11	7	18	4 Mar 2018	+2020s
(Republic of Ireland) Pádraig Harrington	13										13	+2000s	4 Apr 2010
(United States) Nick Watney		8									8	3 Jul 2011	27 Nov 2011
(United States) Tony Finau									5	3	8	2 Dec 2018	+2020s
(United States) Anthony Kim	6										6	+2000s	23 May 2010
(South Africa) Branden Grace							6				6	14 Feb 2016	7 Aug 2016
(Australia) Geoff Ogilvy	2										2	+2000s	17 Jan 2010
(United States) Keegan Bradley				2							2	24 Mar 2013	4 Aug 2013
(United States) Jimmy Walker						2					2	29 Mar 2015	5 Apr 2015
(United States) Kenny Perry	1										1	+2000s	3 Jan 2010

=== 2020s ===
41 players have been in the top 10 so far in the 2020s, updated to 15 November 2026.
The current top-10 are in bold.

Player	20 (Note: The rankings were frozen during the COVID-19 pandemic. Rankings were produced on 15 March 2020 and restarted on 14 June 2020. No rankings were produced for the 12 weeks from 22 March 2020 to 7 June 2020 inclusive.)	21	22	23	24	25	26	27	28	29	Total	First	Last
(Northern Ireland) **Rory McIlroy**	40	27	53	52	52	52	46				322	+2000s	15 Nov 2026
(United States) **Xander Schauffele**	28	52	41	52	52	52	35				312	+2010s	15 Nov 2026
(United States) **Scottie Scheffler**			47	52	52	52	46				249	13 Feb 2022	15 Nov 2026
(Spain) **Jon Rahm**	40	52	53	52	32		5				234	+2010s	15 Nov 2026
(United States) Collin Morikawa	21	52	48	8	33	44	27				233	9 Aug 2020	23 Aug 2026
(United States) Patrick Cantlay	29	44	53	52	40	1					219	+2010s	19 Jan 2025
(United States) Justin Thomas	40	52	53	12		46	5				208	+2010s	1 Feb 2026
(Norway) Viktor Hovland		9	40	39	52	15					155	1 Aug 2021	22 Jun 2025
(United States) Bryson DeChambeau	27	51	5		28	8					119	+2010s	8 Jun 2025
(England) **Matt Fitzpatrick**			26	44	10		35				115	19 Jun 2022	15 Nov 2026
(United States) Dustin Johnson	40	52	17								109	+2010s	1 May 2022
(United States) **Wyndham Clark**				20	52	12	22				106	16 Jul 2023	15 Nov 2026
(England) **Tommy Fleetwood**	7				13	29	46				95	+2010s	15 Nov 2026
(United States) Russell Henley						43	41				84	9 Mar 2025	1 Nov 2026
(Australia) Cameron Smith			47	33							80	9 Jan 2022	20 Aug 2023
(Sweden) Ludvig Åberg					43	28					71	10 Mar 2024	3 Aug 2025
(United States) Max Homa				46	21						67	19 Feb 2023	9 Jun 2024
(United States) Webb Simpson	36	20									56	+2010s	16 May 2021
(United States) Brooks Koepka	28	24									52	+2010s	17 Oct 2021
(United States) J. J. Spaun						29	21				50	15 Jun 2025	28 Jun 2026
(Japan) Hideki Matsuyama			6		20	23	1				50	+2010s	15 Feb 2026
(England) Justin Rose	6					13	29				48	+2000s	19 Jul 2026
(United States) Patrick Reed	23	22									45	+2010s	11 Jul 2021
(England) Tyrrell Hatton	12	25				7					44	11 Oct 2020	2 Mar 2025
(United States) Brian Harman				24	20						44	23 Jul 2023	26 May 2024
(United States) Will Zalatoris			21	21							42	14 Aug 2022	28 May 2023
(United States) **Cameron Young**							36				36	15 Mar 2026	15 Nov 2026
(Scotland) Robert MacIntyre						20	12				32	17 Aug 2025	5 Apr 2026
(United States) **Chris Gotterup**							31				31	8 Feb 2026	15 Nov 2026
(United States) **Sam Burns**			11	2			15				28	2 Jan 2022	15 Nov 2026
(South Africa) Louis Oosthuizen		24									24	+2010s	26 Dec 2021
(United States) Jordan Spieth		1	9	11							21	+2010s	9 Jul 2023
(United States) Harris English		4				12					16	18 Jul 2021	5 Oct 2025
(Australia) Adam Scott	15										15	+2000s	30 Aug 2020
(Austria) Sepp Straka						13	1				14	11 May 2025	8 Mar 2026
(United States) Ben Griffin						8	6				14	9 Nov 2025	8 Feb 2026
(United States) Tony Finau		9									9	+2010s	24 Oct 2021
(United States) Tiger Woods	8										8	+1990s	23 Feb 2020
(United States) Keegan Bradley						7					7	+2010s	3 Aug 2025
(United States) Maverick McNealy						5					5	6 Apr 2025	4 May 2025
(Republic of Ireland) Shane Lowry						1					1	11 May 2025	11 May 2025

== Year-end world top 10 players ==
A number of different methods have been used to calculate the rankings, so that the ranking points given below are not necessarily comparable between different years. From 1986 to 1988 total ranking points determined the order. Since 1989 average ranking points have been used. Until the end of 1995 a three-year system was used, reduced to two years from 1996. The new system produced much lower averages than the earlier one. There have been many changes even since 1996. The tapering system, whereby points gained in an event are gradually lost over the next two years, has also been changed. A change made during 2001 meant that average points were much lower than previously.

Rank	2026	2025	
1	Scottie Scheffler	Scottie Scheffler	16.31
2		Rory McIlroy	9.10
3		Tommy Fleetwood	5.44
4		Xander Schauffele	5.15
5		Russell Henley	4.91
6		J. J. Spaun	4.77
7		Robert MacIntyre	4.64
8		Ben Griffin	4.55
9		Justin Thomas	4.50
10		Justin Rose	4.02

Rank	2024		2023		2022	
1	Scottie Scheffler	15.60	Scottie Scheffler	10.03	Rory McIlroy	8.65
2	Xander Schauffele	9.23	Rory McIlroy	8.63	Scottie Scheffler	8.41
3	Rory McIlroy	7.67	Jon Rahm	7.69	Cameron Smith	7.57
4	Collin Morikawa	5.41	Viktor Hovland	6.60	Patrick Cantlay	7.26
5	Ludvig Åberg	5.32	Patrick Cantlay	5.41	Jon Rahm	6.53
6	Hideki Matsuyama	4.72	Xander Schauffele	5.40	Xander Schauffele	6.19
7	Wyndham Clark	4.65	Max Homa	4.64	Will Zalatoris	5.80
8	Viktor Hovland	4.34	Matt Fitzpatrick	4.54	Justin Thomas	5.41
9	Tommy Fleetwood	3.79	Brian Harman	4.21	Matt Fitzpatrick	5.27
10	Bryson DeChambeau	3.77	Wyndham Clark	4.02	Viktor Hovland	5.23

Rank	2021		2020		2019	
1	Jon Rahm	9.53	Dustin Johnson	12.67	Brooks Koepka	10.43
2	Collin Morikawa	8.76	Jon Rahm	9.98	Rory McIlroy	9.35
3	Dustin Johnson	7.12	Justin Thomas	9.17	Jon Rahm	8.09
4	Patrick Cantlay	6.46	Rory McIlroy	7.14	Justin Thomas	7.08
5	Bryson DeChambeau	6.43	Bryson DeChambeau	7.10	Dustin Johnson	6.92
6	Xander Schauffele	6.39	Webb Simpson	7.02	Tiger Woods	6.58
7	Justin Thomas	6.37	Collin Morikawa	7.01	Patrick Cantlay	6.28
8	Viktor Hovland	6.33	Xander Schauffele	6.90	Justin Rose	6.12
9	Rory McIlroy	6.28	Patrick Cantlay	6.22	Xander Schauffele	5.68
10	Louis Oosthuizen	5.30	Tyrrell Hatton	6.14	Tommy Fleetwood	5.59

Rank	2018		2017		2016	
1	Brooks Koepka	9.62	Dustin Johnson	10.41	Jason Day	10.91
2	Justin Rose	9.61	Jordan Spieth	9.21	Rory McIlroy	9.83
3	Dustin Johnson	8.24	Justin Thomas	8.36	Dustin Johnson	9.53
4	Justin Thomas	7.87	Jon Rahm	8.05	Henrik Stenson	8.69
5	Bryson DeChambeau	6.91	Hideki Matsuyama	7.92	Jordan Spieth	8.04
6	Jon Rahm	6.45	Justin Rose	7.84	Hideki Matsuyama	7.49
7	Francesco Molinari	6.00	Rickie Fowler	6.80	Adam Scott	6.55
8	Rory McIlroy	5.97	Brooks Koepka	6.33	Patrick Reed	5.40
9	Tony Finau	5.54	Henrik Stenson	5.90	Alex Norén	5.35
10	Xander Schauffele	5.49	Sergio García	5.66	Bubba Watson	5.19

Rank	2015		2014		2013	
1	Jordan Spieth	11.51	Rory McIlroy	11.04	Tiger Woods	11.69
2	Jason Day	10.94	Henrik Stenson	8.13	Adam Scott	9.60
3	Rory McIlroy	10.75	Adam Scott	7.71	Henrik Stenson	9.16
4	Bubba Watson	7.95	Bubba Watson	7.27	Justin Rose	7.16
5	Henrik Stenson	7.34	Sergio García	6.70	Phil Mickelson	7.06
6	Rickie Fowler	7.13	Justin Rose	6.69	Rory McIlroy	6.50
7	Justin Rose	7.02	Jim Furyk	6.62	Matt Kuchar	6.15
8	Dustin Johnson	6.13	Jason Day	5.81	Steve Stricker	5.72
9	Jim Furyk	5.62	Jordan Spieth	5.75	Zach Johnson	5.45
10	Patrick Reed	4.66	Rickie Fowler	5.47	Sergio García	5.31

Rank	2012		2011		2010	
1	Rory McIlroy	13.22	Luke Donald	10.03	Lee Westwood	9.24
2	Luke Donald	8.62	Lee Westwood	8.06	Tiger Woods	7.88
3	Tiger Woods	8.53	Rory McIlroy	7.77	Martin Kaymer	7.26
4	Justin Rose	6.42	Martin Kaymer	6.55	Phil Mickelson	6.70
5	Adam Scott	6.21	Adam Scott	5.50	Jim Furyk	6.22
6	Louis Oosthuizen	6.14	Steve Stricker	5.33	Graeme McDowell	6.18
7	Lee Westwood	6.03	Dustin Johnson	5.27	Steve Stricker	6.11
8	Bubba Watson	5.29	Jason Day	5.07	Paul Casey	5.90
9	Jason Dufner	5.29	Charl Schwartzel	5.06	Luke Donald	5.65
10	Brandt Snedeker	5.23	Webb Simpson	5.03	Rory McIlroy	5.60

Rank	2009		2008		2007	
1	Tiger Woods	14.67	Tiger Woods	11.97	Tiger Woods	19.62
2	Phil Mickelson	8.26	Sergio García	8.10	Phil Mickelson	8.72
3	Steve Stricker	6.67	Phil Mickelson	7.03	Jim Furyk	6.55
4	Lee Westwood	6.60	Pádraig Harrington	6.95	Ernie Els	6.51
5	Pádraig Harrington	5.55	Vijay Singh	6.65	Steve Stricker	6.45
6	Jim Furyk	5.53	Robert Karlsson	5.09	Justin Rose	6.00
7	Paul Casey	5.36	Camilo Villegas	4.90	Adam Scott	5.81
8	Henrik Stenson	5.33	Henrik Stenson	4.77	Pádraig Harrington	5.57
9	Rory McIlroy	4.86	Ernie Els	4.77	K. J. Choi	5.15
10	Kenny Perry	4.72	Lee Westwood	4.73	Vijay Singh	5.08

Rank	2006		2005		2004	
1	Tiger Woods	20.41	Tiger Woods	17.16	Vijay Singh	12.79
2	Jim Furyk	8.88	Vijay Singh	9.78	Tiger Woods	11.60
3	Phil Mickelson	7.17	Phil Mickelson	8.14	Ernie Els	10.98
4	Adam Scott	7.03	Retief Goosen	8.10	Retief Goosen	7.47
5	Ernie Els	6.05	Ernie Els	8.03	Phil Mickelson	7.00
6	Retief Goosen	5.61	Sergio García	7.23	Pádraig Harrington	5.55
7	Vijay Singh	5.58	Jim Furyk	5.80	Sergio García	5.40
8	Pádraig Harrington	5.46	Colin Montgomerie	4.78	Mike Weir	5.40
9	Luke Donald	5.25	Adam Scott	4.68	Davis Love III	5.38
10	Geoff Ogilvy	5.21	Chris DiMarco	4.58	Stewart Cink	4.65

Rank	2003		2002		2001	
1	Tiger Woods	14.58	Tiger Woods	15.72	Tiger Woods	15.67
2	Vijay Singh	9.77	Phil Mickelson	7.72	Phil Mickelson	9.16
3	Ernie Els	8.41	Ernie Els	6.84	David Duval	7.98
4	Davis Love III	7.53	Sergio García	6.19	Ernie Els	6.99
5	Jim Furyk	6.81	Retief Goosen	6.16	Davis Love III	6.02
6	Mike Weir	6.54	David Toms	6.02	Sergio García	5.86
7	Retief Goosen	5.92	Pádraig Harrington	5.63	David Toms	5.83
8	Pádraig Harrington	5.28	Vijay Singh	5.53	Vijay Singh	5.60
9	David Toms	5.09	Davis Love III	4.82	Darren Clarke	5.03
10	Kenny Perry	5.08	Colin Montgomerie	4.39	Retief Goosen	4.95

Rank	2000		1999		1998	
1	Tiger Woods	29.40	Tiger Woods	19.98	Tiger Woods	12.30
2	Ernie Els	11.65	David Duval	13.15	Mark O'Meara	10.43
3	David Duval	11.20	Colin Montgomerie	10.36	David Duval	9.67
4	Phil Mickelson	11.07	Davis Love III	9.48	Davis Love III	9.43
5	Lee Westwood	9.46	Ernie Els	8.64	Ernie Els	9.18
6	Colin Montgomerie	8.34	Lee Westwood	7.85	Nick Price	8.98
7	Davis Love III	7.88	Vijay Singh	7.82	Colin Montgomerie	8.91
8	Hal Sutton	7.71	Nick Price	7.20	Lee Westwood	8.65
9	Vijay Singh	7.17	Phil Mickelson	6.58	Vijay Singh	8.51
10	Tom Lehman	7.10	Mark O'Meara	6.52	Phil Mickelson	7.76

Rank	1997		1996		1995	
1	Greg Norman	11.49	Greg Norman	10.78	Greg Norman	21.93
2	Tiger Woods	10.76	Tom Lehman	9.74	Nick Price	16.34
3	Nick Price	9.93	Colin Montgomerie	9.10	Bernhard Langer	15.64
4	Ernie Els	9.89	Ernie Els	8.60	Ernie Els	14.66
5	Davis Love III	9.09	Fred Couples	8.16	Colin Montgomerie	14.00
6	Phil Mickelson	8.73	Nick Faldo	7.98	Nick Faldo	13.94
7	Colin Montgomerie	8.58	Phil Mickelson	7.77	Corey Pavin	13.47
8	Masashi Ozaki	8.05	Masashi Ozaki	7.58	Fred Couples	11.02
9	Tom Lehman	8.02	Davis Love III	7.53	Masashi Ozaki	10.82
10	Mark O'Meara	7.98	Mark O'Meara	7.12	Steve Elkington	10.43

Rank	1994		1993		1992	
1	Nick Price	21.30	Nick Faldo	20.65	Nick Faldo	23.54
2	Greg Norman	20.68	Greg Norman	18.79	Fred Couples	16.27
3	Nick Faldo	16.78	Bernhard Langer	17.19	Ian Woosnam	13.14
4	Bernhard Langer	15.66	Nick Price	15.89	José María Olazábal	12.87
5	José María Olazábal	15.18	Fred Couples	14.93	Greg Norman	12.63
6	Fred Couples	13.74	Paul Azinger	14.59	Bernhard Langer	12.44
7	Ernie Els	13.57	Ian Woosnam	11.41	John Cook	11.68
8	Colin Montgomerie	12.38	Tom Kite	10.07	Nick Price	11.51
9	Masashi Ozaki	11.39	Davis Love III	9.61	Paul Azinger	10.83
10	Corey Pavin	10.87	Corey Pavin	9.59	Davis Love III	10.75

Rank	1991		1990		1989	
1	Ian Woosnam	17.11	Greg Norman	18.95	Greg Norman	17.76
2	Nick Faldo	15.34	Nick Faldo	18.54	Nick Faldo	16.25
3	José María Olazábal	15.32	José María Olazábal	17.22	Seve Ballesteros	15.03
4	Seve Ballesteros	13.70	Ian Woosnam	15.47	Curtis Strange	13.79
5	Greg Norman	13.11	Payne Stewart	12.75	Payne Stewart	12.82
6	Fred Couples	12.78	Paul Azinger	11.63	Tom Kite	12.41
7	Bernhard Langer	12.59	Seve Ballesteros	10.15	José María Olazábal	12.00
8	Payne Stewart	11.83	Tom Kite	10.10	Mark Calcavecchia	11.81
9	Paul Azinger	10.88	Mark McNulty	10.06	Ian Woosnam	11.56
10	Rodger Davis	8.90	Mark Calcavecchia	9.96	Paul Azinger	10.95

Rank	1988		1987		1986	
1	Seve Ballesteros	1458	Greg Norman	1231	Greg Norman	1507
2	Greg Norman	1365	Seve Ballesteros	1169	Bernhard Langer	1181
3	Sandy Lyle	1297	Bernhard Langer	1112	Seve Ballesteros	1175
4	Nick Faldo	1103	Sandy Lyle	879	Tsuneyuki Nakajima	899
5	Curtis Strange	1092	Curtis Strange	873	Andy Bean	694
6	Ben Crenshaw	898	Ian Woosnam	830	Bob Tway	687
7	Ian Woosnam	854	Payne Stewart	717	Hal Sutton	674
8	David Frost	843	Lanny Wadkins	697	Curtis Strange	653
9	Paul Azinger	825	Mark McNulty	673	Payne Stewart	652
10	Mark Calcavecchia	819	Ben Crenshaw	668	Mark O'Meara	639

Source for 1986:

== See also ==
- List of world number one male golfers
- Mark McCormack's world golf rankings
