= 1997 PGA Championship =

Golf tournament

Tournament information
- Dates: August 14–17, 1997
- Location: Mamaroneck, New York, U.S. 40.958°N 73.754°W
- Courses: Winged Foot Golf Club, West Course
- Organized by: PGA of America
- Tour: PGA Tour

Statistics
- Par: 70
- Length: 6,987 yards (6,389 m)
- Field: 150 players, 77 after cut
- Cut: 146 (+6)
- Prize fund: $2.6 million
- Winner's share: $470,000

Champion
- (United States) Davis Love III
- 269 (−11)
- Location in the United States Location in New York

The 1997 PGA Championship was the 79th PGA Championship, held August 14–17 at Winged Foot Golf Club in Mamaroneck, New York, a suburb northeast of New York City. Davis Love III won his only major championship, five strokes ahead of runner-up Justin Leonard, winner of the 1997 Open Championship.

The last few holes on Sunday were played in a steady rain. However, when Love reached the final green with the tournament wrapped up, the sun peeked through the clouds and a rainbow appeared in the sky. Many took it as a symbol of Love finally winning his first major after several close calls and of his late father, a PGA professional, approvingly looking down from above.

Love's performance is remembered as one of the best in modern major championship history. Only two players finished within 10 shots of him. The sports analytics expert Bill Barnwell statistically identified the victory as the second most dominant win of the modern era (1960–2011), only behind Tiger Woods' 15-shot triumph at the 2000 U.S. Open.

This was the first PGA Championship at the West Course and the fifth major; it previously hosted four U.S. Opens (1929, 1959, 1974, and 1984), which later returned in 2006 and 2020. The tournament was televised by TBS Sports and CBS Sports.

== Course layout ==
West Course

Hole	Name	Yards	Par	Hole	Name	Yards	Par
1	Genesis	446	4	10	Pulpit	190	3
2	Elm	411	4	11	Billows	396	4
3	Pinnacle	216	3	12	Cape	540	5
4	Sound View	460	4	13	White Mule	212	3
5	Long Lane	515	5	14	Shamrock	432	4
6	El	324	4	15	Pyramid	423	4
7	Babe-in-the-Woods	161	3	16	Hells Bells	457	4
8	Arena	442	4	17	Well-Well	449	4
9	Meadow	467	4	18	Revelations	448	4
Out		3,442	35	In		3,545	35
Source:				Total		6,987	70

Lengths of the course for previous majors:

- 1984 U.S. Open: 6,930 yards (6,340 m), par 70
- 1974 U.S. Open: 6,961 yards (6,365 m), par 70
- 1959 U.S. Open: 6,873 yards (6,285 m), par 70
- 1929 U.S. Open: 6,786 yards (6,205 m), par 72

== Round summaries ==
=== First round ===
Thursday, August 14, 1997

Place	Player	Score	To par
T1	(United States) John Daly	66	−4
T1	(United States) Davis Love III	66	−4
3	(Australia) Robert Allenby	67	−3
T4	(United States) Paul Azinger	68	−2
T4	(United States) Tom Kite	68	−2
T4	(United States) Justin Leonard	68	−2
T4	(Japan) Shigeki Maruyama	68	−2
T4	(Australia) Greg Norman	68	−2
T4	(United States) Chris Perry	68	−2
T4	(United States) Paul Stankowski	68	−2
T4	(United States) Bob Tway	68	−2

=== Second round ===
Friday, August 15, 1997

Place	Player	Score	To par
1	(United States) Lee Janzen	69-67=136	−4
2	(United States) Davis Love III	66-71=137	−3
T3	(United States) Phil Blackmar	70-68=138	−2
T3	(United States) Fred Couples	71-67=138	−2
T3	(United States) Justin Leonard	68-70=138	−2
T3	(United States) Jeff Maggert	69-69=138	−2
T3	(Japan) Shigeki Maruyama	68-70=138	−2
T3	(United States) Phil Mickelson	69-69=138	−2
T3	(Italy) Costantino Rocca	69-69=138	−2
T10	(United States) John Daly	66-73=139	−1
T10	(Australia) Greg Norman	68-71=139	−1
T10	(United States) Chris Perry	68-71=139	−1
T10	(Fiji) Vijay Singh	73-66=139	−1
T10	(United States) Paul Stankowski	68-71=139	−1

=== Third round ===
Saturday, August 16, 1997

Place	Player	Score	To par
T1	(United States) Justin Leonard	68-70-65=203	−7
T1	(United States) Davis Love III	66-71-66=203	−7
T3	(United States) Lee Janzen	69-67-74=210	E
T3	(United States) Tom Kite	68-71-71=210	E
T5	(United States) Fred Couples	71-67-73=211	+1
T5	(United States) David Duval	70-70-71=211	+1
T5	(United States) Scott Hoch	71-72-68=211	+1
T5	(United States) Jeff Maggert	69-69-73=211	+1
T5	(United States) Phil Mickelson	69-69-73=211	+1
T5	(United States) Tiger Woods	70-70-71=211	+1

=== Final round ===
Sunday, August 17, 1997

Place	Player	Score	To par	Money ($)
1	(United States) Davis Love III	66-71-66-66=269	−11	470,000
2	(United States) Justin Leonard	68-70-65-71=274	−6	280,000
3	(United States) Jeff Maggert	69-69-73-65=276	−4	175,000
4	(United States) Lee Janzen	69-67-74-69=279	−1	125,000
5	(United States) Tom Kite	68-71-71-70=280	E	105,000
T6	(United States) Phil Blackmar	70-68-74-69=281	+1	85,000
T6	(United States) Jim Furyk	69-72-72-68=281	+1	85,000
T6	(United States) Scott Hoch	71-72-68-70=281	+1	85,000
9	(United States) Tom Byrum	69-73-70-70=282	+2	70,000
T10	(United States) Tom Lehman	69-72-72-70=283	+3	60,000
T10	(United States) Scott McCarron	74-71-67-71=283	+3	60,000
T10	(United States) Joey Sindelar	72-71-71-69=283	+3	60,000
