= Davis Love III =

American professional golfer (born 1964)

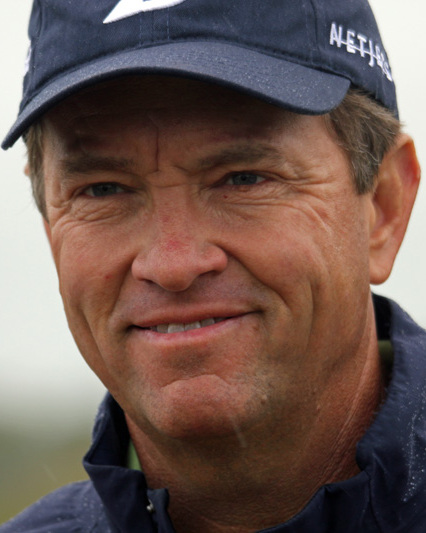
- Love in 2012

Personal information
- Full name: Davis Milton Love III
- Nationality: United States
- Born: April 13, 1964 (age 62) Charlotte, North Carolina, U.S.
- Height: 6 ft 3 in (1.91 m)
- Weight: 175 lb (79 kg; 12.5 st)
- Spouse: Robin Love
- Children: Alexia, Davis IV

Career
- Sport: Golf
- College: North Carolina
- Turned professional: 1985
- Current tours: PGA Tour; PGA Tour Champions
- Professional wins: 37
- Highest ranking: 2 (July 19, 1998)

Number of wins by tour
- PGA Tour: 21
- European Tour: 1
- Japan Golf Tour: 1
- Other: 15

Best results in major championships (wins: 1)
- Masters Tournament: 2nd: 1995, 1999
- PGA Championship: Won: 1997
- U.S. Open: T2: 1996
- The Open Championship: T4: 2003

Achievements and awards
- World Golf Hall of Fame: 2017 (member page)
- Payne Stewart Award: 2008
- Bob Jones Award: 2013

Davis Milton Love III (born April 13, 1964) is an American professional golfer who has won 21 events on the PGA Tour, including one major championship: the 1997 PGA Championship. He won the Players Championship in 1992 and 2003. He was in the top 10 of the Official World Golf Ranking for over 450 weeks, reaching a high ranking of 2nd. He captained the U.S. Ryder Cup teams in 2012 and 2016. Love was inducted into the World Golf Hall of Fame in 2017.

== Early life ==
Davis Milton Love III was born on April 13, 1964, in Charlotte, North Carolina, to Davis Love Jr. and his wife, Helen, a day after his father competed in the final round at the 1964 Masters Tournament. His father, who was a former pro and nationally recognized golf instructor, introduced him to the game. His mother is also an avid low-handicap golfer. His father was killed in a 1988 plane crash.

Love attended high school in Brunswick, Georgia, and graduated from its Glynn Academy in 1982.

== Amateur career ==
Love played college golf at the University of North Carolina in Chapel Hill, where he was a three-time All-American and all-Atlantic Coast Conference. He won six titles during his collegiate career, including the ACC tournament championship as a sophomore in 1984.

== Professional career ==
In 1985, Love turned professional. He earned his PGA Tour card late in the season at 1985 PGA Tour Qualifying School. It was his first attempt at PGA Tour Qualifying school on his first attempt. He quickly established himself on the PGA Tour, winning his first tour event in 1987 at the MCI Heritage Golf Classic at Harbour Town Golf Links. He would later win this event four more times, setting a record for the most victories in the tournament.

In 1994, Love founded Love Golf Design, a golf course architecture company with his younger brother and caddie, Mark Love. The company has been responsible for the design of several courses throughout the southeast United States. Completed in 1997, Ocean Creek is his first signature course and is located on Fripp Island, South Carolina. Love also designed the Dunes course at Diamante in Cabo San Lucas, Mexico, which is ranked among Golf Magazine's Top 100 courses in the world.

Love was a consistent contender and winner on the PGA Tour in the 1990s and early 2000s, but the most memorable win came at the 1997 PGA Championship, his only major championship victory. It was played at Winged Foot Golf Club near New York City, and just four players in the field finished under-par for the week. Love's winning score was 11-under-par, five strokes better than runner-up Justin Leonard. When Love sank his birdie putt on the final hole of the championship, it was under the arc of a rainbow, which appeared as he walked up to the 18th green. In the telecast, CBS Sports announcer Jim Nantz made the connection between the rainbow and Love's late father, Davis Love Jr., who was a well-known and beloved figure in the golf world. This victory was the last major championship win achieved with a wooden-headed driver.

Love has had success late in his regular career. On November 9, 2008, Love earned his 20th PGA Tour win at the Children's Miracle Network Classic, which gave him a lifetime exemption on Tour.

=== Senior career ===
After failing to qualify for the FedEx Cup in 2014, Love made his Champions Tour debut at the Pacific Links Hawaii Championship.

Love's victory in the 2015 Wyndham Championship—at age 51—made him the third-oldest winner in PGA Tour history, trailing only Sam Snead and Art Wall Jr. The win made Love the oldest PGA Tour winner in the PGA Tour Champions era (since 1980). It also brought Love into select company in another PGA Tour distinction: he became only the third player to win on the tour in four different decades, joining Snead and Raymond Floyd.

Love's son Davis Love IV (better known as Dru Love) is also a professional golfer. Love has worked with his son at a number of tournaments. In 2015, his son earned a sponsor exemption into the RSM Classic while still an amateur; Love III serves as the host. After Love failed to qualify for the 2017 U.S. Open, he caddied for Dru, who made his professional debut. On December 16, 2018, Love and his son Dru, for the second time won the Father/Son Challenge at Ritz-Carlton Golf Club in Orlando, Florida. Their first win came in 2012.

Love has served as the captain of several national teams as a senior. In 2012, he was the captain of the American Ryder Cup team. Four years later, he was captain of the 2016 Ryder Cup. Love served as a vice-captain to Jim Furyk at the 2018 Ryder Cup. Four years later, Love captained the U.S. team to victory in the 2022 Presidents Cup.

For the 2020 PGA Tour season, Love joined CBS as a full-time analyst. In July 2020, Love announced that he was leaving his role with CBS in order to "focus on my family, play a few tournaments, and bring some stability back in a difficult year."

== Personal life ==
He and his wife Robin have two children. On March 27, 2020, Love's home in St. Simons Island, Georgia, was destroyed in a fire. Love and his wife escaped without injury.

Love is a Republican, and has donated money to Johnny Isakson and George W. Bush.

== Awards and honors ==
- In 1997, his book, Every Shot I Take, received the United States Golf Association's International Book Award.
- In 2008, Love III won the Payne Stewart Award
- In 2013, he earned the Bob Jones Award
- In 2017, Love III was inducted into the World Golf Hall of Fame

== Amateur wins ==
- 1984 North and South Amateur, Middle Atlantic Amateur

== Professional wins (37) ==
=== PGA Tour wins (21) ===
Legend
Major championships (1)
Players Championships (2)
Other PGA Tour (18)

No.	Date	Tournament	Winning score	To par	Margin of victory	Runner(s)-up
1	Apr 19, 1987	MCI Heritage Golf Classic	70-67-67-67=271	−13	1 stroke	(United States) Steve Jones
2	Aug 19, 1990	The International	14 pts (8-0-15-14=14)		3 points	(United States) Steve Pate, (Argentina) Eduardo Romero, (Australia) Peter Senior
3	Apr 21, 1991	MCI Heritage Golf Classic (2)	65-68-68-70=271	−13	2 strokes	(Australia) Ian Baker-Finch
4	Mar 29, 1992	The Players Championship	67-68-71-67=273	−15	4 strokes	(Australia) Ian Baker-Finch, (United States) Phil Blackmar, (England) Nick Faldo, (United States) Tom Watson
5	Apr 19, 1992	MCI Heritage Golf Classic (3)	67-67-68-67=269	−15	4 strokes	(United States) Chip Beck
6	Apr 26, 1992	KMart Greater Greensboro Open	71-68-71-62=272	−16	6 strokes	(United States) John Cook
7	Jan 10, 1993	Infiniti Tournament of Champions	67-67-69-69=272	−16	1 stroke	(United States) Tom Kite
8	Oct 24, 1993	Las Vegas Invitational	67-66-67-65-66=331	−29	8 strokes	(United States) Craig Stadler
9	Apr 2, 1995	Freeport-McMoRan Classic	68-69-66-71=274	−14	Playoff	(United States) Mike Heinen
10	Feb 11, 1996	Buick Invitational	66-70-69-64=269	−19	2 strokes	(United States) Phil Mickelson
11	Aug 17, 1997	PGA Championship	66-71-66-66=269	−11	5 strokes	(United States) Justin Leonard
12	Oct 5, 1997	Buick Challenge	67-65-67-68=267	−21	4 strokes	(United States) Stewart Cink
13	Apr 19, 1998	MCI Classic (4)	67-68-66-65=266	−18	7 strokes	(United States) Glen Day
14	Feb 4, 2001	AT&T Pebble Beach National Pro-Am	71-69-69-63=272	−16	1 stroke	(Fiji) Vijay Singh
15	Feb 9, 2003	AT&T Pebble Beach National Pro-Am (2)	72-67-67-68=274	−14	1 stroke	(United States) Tom Lehman
16	Mar 30, 2003	The Players Championship (2)	70-67-70-64=271	−17	6 strokes	(United States) Jay Haas, (Republic of Ireland) Pádraig Harrington
17	Apr 20, 2003	MCI Heritage (5)	66-69-69-67=271	−13	Playoff	(United States) Woody Austin
18	Aug 10, 2003	The International (2)	46 pts (19-17-5-5=46)		12 points	(South Africa) Retief Goosen, (Fiji) Vijay Singh
19	Oct 8, 2006	Chrysler Classic of Greensboro (2)	69-69-68-66=272	−16	2 strokes	(United States) Jason Bohn
20	Nov 9, 2008	Children's Miracle Network Classic	66-69-64-64=263	−25	1 stroke	(United States) Tommy Gainey
21	Aug 23, 2015	Wyndham Championship (3)	64-66-69-64=263	−17	1 stroke	(United States) Jason Gore

PGA Tour playoff record (2–7)

No.	Year	Tournament	Opponent(s)	Result
1	1989	Nestle Invitational	(United States) Tom Kite	Lost to par on second extra hole
2	1991	NEC World Series of Golf	(United States) Jim Gallagher Jr., (United States) Tom Purtzer	Purtzer won with par on second extra hole
3	1992	Nissan Los Angeles Open	(United States) Fred Couples	Lost to birdie on second extra hole
4	1995	Freeport-McMoRan Classic	(United States) Mike Heinen	Won with birdie on second extra hole
5	1996	Buick Challenge	(United States) Michael Bradley, (United States) Fred Funk, (United States) John Maginnes, (United States) Len Mattiace	Bradley won with birdie on first extra hole
6	1996	Las Vegas Invitational	(United States) Tiger Woods	Lost to par on first extra hole
7	2000	GTE Byron Nelson Classic	(United States) Phil Mickelson, (Sweden) Jesper Parnevik	Parnevik won with par on third extra hole Mickelson eliminated by birdie on second hole
8	2001	Buick Invitational	(United States) Frank Lickliter, (United States) Phil Mickelson	Mickelson won with double-bogey on third extra hole Love eliminated by par on second hole
9	2003	MCI Heritage	(United States) Woody Austin	Won with birdie on fourth extra hole

=== PGA of Japan Tour wins (1) ===
No.	Date	Tournament	Winning score	To par	Margin of victory	Runners-up
1	May 3, 1998	The Crowns	64-71-67-67=269	−11	8 strokes	(Canada) Rick Gibson, (Japan) Masanobu Kimura, (United States) Brian Watts

=== Other wins (15) ===
No.	Date	Tournament	Winning score	To par	Margin of victory	Runner(s)-up
1	Dec 2, 1990	JCPenney Classic (with (United States) Beth Daniel)	67-70-62-67=266	−12	5 strokes	(United States) Jay Haas and (United States) Nancy Lopez
2	Nov 8, 1992	World Cup (with (United States) Fred Couples)	134-139-140-135=548	−28	1 stroke	Sweden − Anders Forsbrand and Per-Ulrik Johansson
3	Nov 15, 1992	Kapalua International	65-71-72-67=275	−17	1 stroke	(United States) Mike Hulbert
4	Nov 22, 1992	Franklin Funds Shark Shootout (with (United States) Tom Kite)	65-69-59=191	−25	1 stroke	(United States) Billy Ray Brown and (Zimbabwe) Nick Price, (United States) Fred Couples and (United States) Raymond Floyd, (United States) Hale Irwin and (United States) Bruce Lietzke
5	Nov 14, 1993	World Cup of Golf (2) (with (United States) Fred Couples)	137-140-141-138=556	−20	5 strokes	Zimbabwe − Mark McNulty and Nick Price
6	Nov 13, 1994	World Cup of Golf (3) (with (United States) Fred Couples)	132-129-137-138=536	−40	14 strokes	Zimbabwe − Tony Johnstone and Mark McNulty
7	Nov 12, 1995	World Cup of Golf (4) (with (United States) Fred Couples)	133-136-138-136=543	−33	14 strokes	Australia − Robert Allenby and Brett Ogle
8	Nov 12, 1995	World Cup of Golf Individual Trophy	65-67-68-67=267	−21	Playoff	(Japan) Hisayuki Sasaki
9	Dec 3, 1995	JCPenney Classic (2) (with (United States) Beth Daniel)	66-65-63-63=257	−27	2 strokes	(Sweden) Helen Alfredsson and (United States) Robert Gamez
10	Nov 9, 1997	Lincoln-Mercury Kapalua International (2)	67-66-67-68=268	−20	4 strokes	(United States) Olin Browne, (United States) David Toms
11	Jul 11, 2000	CVS Charity Classic (with (United States) Justin Leonard)	60-66=126	−16	3 strokes	(Australia) Steve Elkington and (United States) Craig Stadler
12	Dec 3, 2000	Williams World Challenge	67-64-71-64=266	−22	2 strokes	(United States) Tiger Woods
13	Dec 14, 2003	Target World Challenge (2)	70-72-63-72=277	−11	2 strokes	(United States) Tiger Woods
14	Dec 16, 2012	PNC Father-Son Challenge (with son Dru Love)	60-61=121	−23	1 stroke	(United States) Larry Nelson and son Josh Nelson
15	Dec 16, 2018	PNC Father-Son Challenge (2) (with son Dru Love)	62-56=118	−26	3 strokes	(United States) Stewart Cink and son Connor Cink, (United States) John Daly and son John Daly II, (South Africa) Retief Goosen and son Leo Goosen

Other playoff record (1–3)

No.	Year	Tournament	Opponent(s)	Result
1	1991	Isuzu Kapalua International	(United States) Mike Hulbert	Lost to birdie on first extra hole
2	1995	World Cup of Golf Individual Trophy	(Japan) Hisayuki Sasaki	Won with par on fifth extra hole
3	2008	CVS Caremark Charity Classic (with (United States) Billy Andrade)	(United States) Paul Goydos and (United States) Tim Herron, (United States) Rocco Mediate and (United States) Brandt Snedeker, (Colombia) Camilo Villegas and (United States) Bubba Watson	Villegas/Watson won by 1 stroke in three-hole aggregate playoff
4	2015	PNC Father-Son Challenge	(United States) Fred Funk and son Taylor Funk, (United States) Larry Nelson and son Drew Nelson, (United States) Lanny Wadkins and son Tucker Wadkins	Team Wadkins won with eagle on first extra hole

== Major championships ==
=== Wins (1) ===
Year	Championship	54 holes	Winning score	Margin	Runner-up
1997	PGA Championship	Tied for lead	−11 (66-71-66-66=269)	5 strokes	(United States) Justin Leonard

=== Results timeline ===
Results not in chronological order in 2020.

Tournament	1986	1987	1988	1989
Masters Tournament			CUT	
U.S. Open			CUT	T33
The Open Championship		CUT	CUT	T23
PGA Championship	T47	CUT		T17

Tournament	1990	1991	1992	1993	1994	1995	1996	1997	1998	1999
Masters Tournament		T42	T25	T54	CUT	2	T7	T7	T33	2
U.S. Open		T11	T60	T33	T28	T4	T2	T16	CUT	T12
The Open Championship	CUT	T44	CUT	CUT	T38	T98	CUT	T10	8	T7
PGA Championship	T40	T32	T33	T31	CUT	CUT	CUT	1	T7	T49

Tournament	2000	2001	2002	2003	2004	2005	2006	2007	2008	2009
Masters Tournament	T7	CUT	T14	T15	T6	CUT	T22	T27		
U.S. Open	CUT	T7	T24	CUT	CUT	T6	CUT	CUT	T53	
The Open Championship	T11	T21	T14	T4	T5	CUT	CUT	CUT	T19	T27
PGA Championship	T9	T37	T48	CUT	CUT	T4	T34	CUT	CUT	CUT

Tournament	2010	2011	2012	2013	2014	2015	2016	2017	2018
Masters Tournament		CUT					T42		
U.S. Open	T6	T11	T29						
The Open Championship	CUT	T9	CUT						
PGA Championship	T55	T72	CUT	CUT	CUT	CUT		CUT	CUT

Tournament	2019	2020
Masters Tournament		
PGA Championship		CUT
U.S. Open		
The Open Championship		NT

Win
Top 10
Did not play

CUT = missed the half-way cut
"T" indicates a tie for a place
NT = No tournament due to COVID-19 pandemic

=== Summary ===
Tournament	Wins	2nd	3rd	Top-5	Top-10	Top-25	Events	Cuts made
Masters Tournament	0	2	0	2	6	10	20	15
U.S. Open	0	1	0	2	5	10	23	16
The Open Championship	0	0	0	2	6	11	26	15
PGA Championship	1	0	0	2	4	5	32	16
Totals	1	3	0	8	21	36	101	62

- Most consecutive cuts made – 8 (2001 U.S. Open – 2003 Masters)
- Longest streak of top-10s – 3 (1998 Open Championship – 1999 Masters)

== The Players Championship ==
=== Wins (2) ===
Year	Championship	54 holes	Winning score	Margin	Runners-up
1992	The Players Championship	3 shot deficit	−15 (67-68-71-67=273)	4 strokes	(Australia) Ian Baker-Finch, (United States) Phil Blackmar, (England) Nick Faldo, (United States) Tom Watson
2003	The Players Championship (2)	2 shot deficit	−17 (70-67-70-64=271)	6 strokes	(United States) Jay Haas, (Republic of Ireland) Pádraig Harrington

=== Results timeline ===
Tournament	1986	1987	1988	1989	1990	1991	1992	1993	1994	1995	1996	1997	1998	1999
The Players Championship	T14	CUT	DQ	CUT	T24	CUT	1	T67	T6	T6	T46	DQ	T57	T10

Tournament	2000	2001	2002	2003	2004	2005	2006	2007	2008	2009	2010	2011	2012	2013	2014	2015	2016
The Players Championship	T48	CUT	CUT	1	T33	T8	CUT	T75	T54	CUT	T4	T12	CUT	T48			CUT

Win
Top 10
Did not play

CUT = missed the halfway cut
DQ = disqualified
"T" indicates a tie for a place.

== Results in World Golf Championships ==
Results not in chronological order before 2015.

Tournament	1999	2000	2001	2002	2003	2004	2005	2006	2007	2008	2009	2010	2011	2012	2013	2014	2015	2016
Championship	T16		NT^{1}	8	T40	T41	T11		WD		T28							
Match Play	R64	4		R32	R32	2	R16	2	R64		R32							
Invitational	T10	35	T5	T11	3	T4	T13	T4	T6		T19							WD
Champions																		

^{1}Cancelled due to 9/11

Top 10
Did not play

QF, R16, R32, R64 = Round in which player lost in match play
"T" = Tied
WD = Withdrew
NT = No tournament
Note that the HSBC Champions did not become a WGC event until 2009.

== PGA Tour career summary ==
Season	Wins (majors)	Earnings ($)	Rank
1985	0	0	-
1986	0	113,245	77
1987	1	297,378	33
1988	0	156,068	75
1989	0	278,760	44
1990	1	537,172	20
1991	1	686,361	8
1992	3	1,191,630	2
1993	2	777,059	12
1994	0	474,219	33
1995	1	1,111,999	6
1996	1	1,211,139	7
1997	2 (1)	1,635,953	3
1998	1	1,541,152	11
1999	0	2,475,328	3
2000	0	2,337,765	9
2001	1	3,169,463	5
2002	0	2,056,160	21
2003	4	6,081,896	3
2004	0	3,075,092	10
2005	0	2,658,779	13
2006	1	2,747,206	16
2007	0	1,016,489	96
2008	1	1,695,237	48
2009	0	1,622,401	52
2010	0	1,214,472	73
2011	0	1,056,300	88
2012	0	989,753	100
2013	0	303,470	165
2014	0	284,800	173
2015	1	1,263,596	75
2016	0	222,422	189
2017	0	257,270	187
2018	0	97,920	209
2019	0	271,216	193
2020	0	35,025	228
2021	0	0	-
Career*	21 (1)	44,944,195	16

*As of the 2021 season.

== U.S. national team appearances ==
Amateur

- Walker Cup: 1985 (winners)

Professional

- Dunhill Cup: 1992
- World Cup: 1992 (winners), 1993 (winners), 1994 (winners), 1995 (winners), 1997
- Ryder Cup: 1993 (winners), 1995, 1997, 1999 (winners), 2002, 2004, 2012 (non-playing captain), 2016 (non-playing captain, winners)
- Presidents Cup: 1994 (winners), 1996 (winners), 1998, 2000 (winners), 2003 (tie), 2005 (winners), 2022 (non-playing captain, winners)
- Wendy's 3-Tour Challenge (representing PGA Tour): 1996 (winners), 1998, 2012 (winners)

== Bibliography ==
- Every Shot I Take, 1997, ISBN 0684834006

== See also ==
- 1985 PGA Tour Qualifying School graduates
- List of golfers with most PGA Tour wins
- List of men's major championships winning golfers
- List of golfers with most wins in one PGA Tour event
