= Paul Stankowski =

American professional golfer (born 1969)

Personal information
- Full name: Paul Francis Stankowski
- Nationality: United States
- Born: December 2, 1969 (age 56) Oxnard, California, U.S.

Career
- Sport: Golf
- College: University of Texas at El Paso
- Turned professional: 1991
- Current tour: PGA Tour Champions
- Former tours: PGA Tour; Nationwide Tour; Gateway Tour
- Professional wins: 8
- Highest ranking: 25 (September 7, 1997)

Number of wins by tour
- PGA Tour: 2
- Japan Golf Tour: 1
- Korn Ferry Tour: 1
- Other: 4

Best results in major championships
- Masters Tournament: T5: 1997
- PGA Championship: T41: 2000
- U.S. Open: T19: 1997
- The Open Championship: CUT: 1997

Paul Francis Stankowski (born December 2, 1969) is an American professional golfer who currently plays on the PGA Tour Champions. He previously played on the Korn Ferry Tour, where he won one event, and the PGA Tour, where he was a two-time champion.

== Early life ==
Stankowski was born in Oxnard, California. He first played golf on Easter Sunday in 1978 at the age of 8. He attended the University of Texas at El Paso.

== Professional career ==
In 1991, Stankowski turned professional. He initially played on the Nike Tour. His first and only victory in this tour came at the 1996 Nike Louisiana Open. The following week, he won the BellSouth Classic on the PGA Tour. Stankowski started the week as the sixth alternate. He won becoming the only golfer in history to win a developmental tour event and a PGA Tour event in back-to-back weeks. He had another big year in 1997, winning the United Airlines Hawaiian Open. His best finish in a major was T5 at the 1997 Masters Tournament.

In 1998, however, his fortunes began to change due to a host of injury-related ailments. He injured his right shoulder at the Bay Hill Invitational that year and also had LASIK surgery. As a Callaway sponsored player in 1999, he tried to help his game by sneaking Ping clubs into his bag at the Colonial. In 2004, he suffered a major injury to his left wrist and played the two following years under a Major Medical Extension.

Stankowski made over 400 starts on the PGA Tour. Towards the end of his PGA Tour career, his desire to be closer to his family resulted in him focusing entrepreneurship and radio broadcasting. He is the co-owner of Francis Edward, a leather goods company whose name is derived from the middle names of Stankowski and co-founder Mike Vicary.

In 2018 and 2019, he took advantage of an exemption reserved for those 48 and 49 years old on the Korn Ferry Tour, playing in a total of six events but not making the cut in any of them.

In December 2021, Stankowski finished high enough at the PGA Tour Champions Qualifying School (Q-School) to earn eligibility to compete in open qualifiers for PGA Tour Champions events in 2022.

== Personal life ==
Stankowski is married and has two children.

Stankowski is active in the Fellowship of Christian Athletes (FCA) and sponsored the annual Paul Stankowski FCA Golf Scramble in El Paso for a time. He lives in Flower Mound, Texas in the Dallas-Fort Worth metroplex.

== Professional wins (8) ==
=== PGA Tour wins (2) ===
No.	Date	Tournament	Winning score	Margin of victory	Runner(s)-up
1	Apr 7, 1996	BellSouth Classic	−8 (68-71-70-71=280)	Playoff	(United States) Brandel Chamblee
2	Feb 16, 1997	United Airlines Hawaiian Open	−17 (71-66-64-70=271)	Playoff	(United States) Jim Furyk, (United States) Mike Reid

PGA Tour playoff record (2–0)

No.	Year	Tournament	Opponent(s)	Result
1	1996	BellSouth Classic	(United States) Brandel Chamblee	Won with par on first extra hole
2	1997	United Airlines Hawaiian Open	(United States) Jim Furyk, (United States) Mike Reid	Won with birdie on fourth extra hole Reid eliminated by par on first hole

=== PGA of Japan Tour wins (1) ===
No.	Date	Tournament	Winning score	Margin of victory	Runner-up
1	Nov 24, 1996	Casio World Open	−11 (69-69-71-68=277)	Playoff	(United States) David Ishii

PGA of Japan Tour playoff record (1–0)

No.	Year	Tournament	Opponent	Result
1	1996	Casio World Open	(United States) David Ishii	Won with birdie on first extra hole

=== Nike Tour wins (1) ===
No.	Date	Tournament	Winning score	Margin of victory	Runner-up
1	Mar 31, 1996	Nike Louisiana Open	−22 (69-66-64-67=266)	4 strokes	(United States) Greg Whisman

=== Gateway Tour wins (1) ===
- 2009 DFW Summer 10

=== Other wins (3) ===
- 1992 New Mexico Open
- 1996 Lincoln-Mercury Kapalua International
- 2001 Straight Down Fall Classic (with Brad Payne)

== Results in major championships ==
Tournament	1994	1995	1996	1997	1998	1999	2000	2001	2002
Masters Tournament			CUT	T5	T39				
U.S. Open	CUT			T19	CUT				T62
The Open Championship				CUT					
PGA Championship		CUT	T47	T67	CUT		T41	74	

Top 10
Did not play

CUT = missed the half-way cut
"T" = tied

== Results in The Players Championship ==
Tournament	1995	1996	1997	1998	1999	2000	2001	2002	2003	2004
The Players Championship	CUT		T14	WD	CUT	CUT	T44	CUT	CUT	T16

Did not play

CUT = missed the halfway cut
WD = withdrew
"T" indicates a tie for a place

== Results in senior major championships ==
Results not in chronological order

Tournament	2021	2022	2023	2024	2025	2026
Senior PGA Championship	T23	T43	T26	T17	CUT	CUT
The Tradition			T23		T27	T51
U.S. Senior Open			T18	T8	8	T5
Senior Players Championship	T20	T38	T44	16	T57	T28
The Senior Open Championship	CUT			CUT	T56	T26

Top 10
Did not play

CUT = missed the halfway cut
"T" indicates a tie for a place

== See also ==
- 1993 PGA Tour Qualifying School graduates
- 1995 PGA Tour Qualifying School graduates
- 2006 PGA Tour Qualifying School graduates
- 2010 PGA Tour Qualifying School graduates
