= Phil Blackmar =

American professional golfer (born 1957)

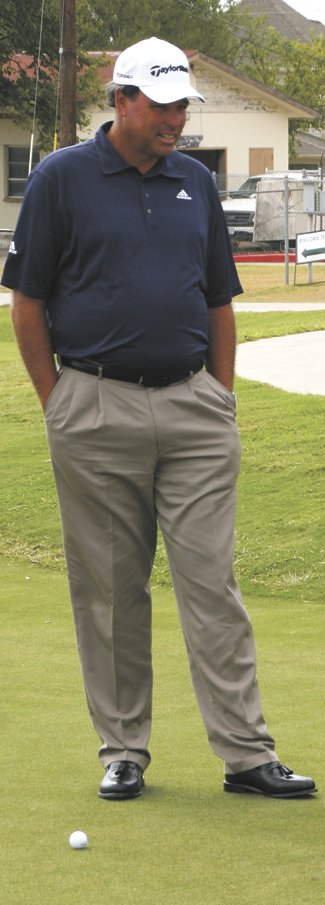

Personal information
- Full name: Philip Arnold Blackmar
- Nationality: United States
- Born: September 22, 1957 (age 69) San Diego, California, U.S.
- Height: 6 ft 7 in (2.01 m)
- Weight: 245 lb (111 kg; 17.5 st)
- Spouse: Carol (née Bragdon)
- Children: 4

Career
- Sport: Golf
- College: University of Texas
- Turned professional: 1980
- Former tours: PGA Tour; Champions Tour
- Professional wins: 5
- Highest ranking: 71 (February 15, 1998)

Number of wins by tour
- PGA Tour: 3
- PGA Tour Champions: 1

Best results in major championships
- Masters Tournament: T33: 1998
- PGA Championship: T6: 1997
- U.S. Open: T35: 1986
- The Open Championship: CUT: 1997

Achievements and awards
- PGA Tour Rookie of the Year: 1985

Philip Arnold Blackmar (born September 22, 1957) is an American professional golfer. He played on the PGA Tour from 1985 to 2000 and on the Champions Tour from 2007 to 2012. He was the tallest player on the PGA Tour during his time on tour, standing 6'7".

== Early life and amateur career ==
Blackmar was born in San Diego, California. He played college golf at the University of Texas where he was a three-time All-Southwest Conference selection. He graduated in 1979 with a degree in finance.

== Professional career ==
In 1980, Blackmar turned pro. He played on mini-tours for a few years before earning his 1985 PGA Tour card by finishing second at the 1984 qualifying school. He won three PGA Tour events, all in playoffs: 1985 Canon Sammy Davis Jr.-Greater Hartford Open, 1988 Provident Classic, and 1997 Shell Houston Open. He stopped playing the tour after the 2000 season and worked as an analyst and commentator for U.S. TV networks.

After turning 50 in September 2007, Blackmar began playing on the Champions Tour. He won his first Champions Tour event in 2009 at the AT&T Championship by one stroke over three players. He went 36 holes bogey-free over the weekend in San Antonio, Texas.

== Professional wins (5) ==
=== PGA Tour wins (3) ===
No.	Date	Tournament	Winning score	Margin of victory	Runner(s)-up
1	Jul 28, 1985	Canon Sammy Davis Jr.-Greater Hartford Open	−17 (72-67-64-68=271)	Playoff	(United States) Jodie Mudd, (United States) Dan Pohl
2	Aug 18, 1988	Provident Classic	−24 (66-64-69-65=264)	Playoff	(United States) Payne Stewart
3	May 4, 1997	Shell Houston Open	−12 (68-71-67-70=276)	Playoff	(United States) Kevin Sutherland

PGA Tour playoff record (3–0)

No.	Year	Tournament	Opponent(s)	Result
1	1985	Canon Sammy Davis Jr.-Greater Hartford Open	(United States) Jodie Mudd, (United States) Dan Pohl	Won with birdie on first extra hole
2	1988	Provident Classic	(United States) Payne Stewart	Won with birdie on first extra hole
3	1997	Shell Houston Open	(United States) Kevin Sutherland	Won with birdie on first extra hole

=== Champions Tour wins (1) ===
No.	Date	Tournament	Winning vcore	Margin of victory	Runners-up
1	Oct 25, 2009	AT&T Championship	−10 (72-67-64=203)	1 stroke	(United States) Andy Bean, (United States) Jay Haas, (United States) Tom Kite

=== Other wins (1) ===
this list is incomplete

- 1983 Missouri Open

== Results in major championships ==
Tournament	1984	1985	1986	1987	1988	1989
Masters Tournament			T45			
U.S. Open	T43	CUT	T35			
The Open Championship						
PGA Championship		T65	T53	T40		T53

Tournament	1990	1991	1992	1993	1994	1995	1996	1997	1998
Masters Tournament									T33
U.S. Open	CUT	CUT	CUT				CUT		
The Open Championship								CUT	
PGA Championship		T73	CUT				T47	T6	CUT

Top 10
Did not play

CUT = missed the half-way cut
"T" = tied

=== Summary ===
Tournament	Wins	2nd	3rd	Top-5	Top-10	Top-25	Events	Cuts made
Masters Tournament	0	0	0	0	0	0	2	2
U.S. Open	0	0	0	0	0	0	7	2
The Open Championship	0	0	0	0	0	0	1	0
PGA Championship	0	0	0	0	1	1	9	7
Totals	0	0	0	0	1	1	19	11

- Most consecutive cuts made – 6 (1985 PGA – 1989 PGA)
- Longest streak of top-10s – 1

== Results in The Players Championship ==
Tournament	1985	1986	1987	1988	1989	1990	1991	1992	1993	1994	1995	1996	1997	1998
The Players Championship	T64	CUT	CUT	CUT	CUT	CUT	T3	T2	CUT	CUT		CUT	T53	T66

Top 10
Did not play

CUT = missed the halfway cut
"T" indicates a tie for a place

== See also ==
- 1984 PGA Tour Qualifying School graduates
- 1994 PGA Tour Qualifying School graduates
