= 1997 Players Championship =

Tournament information
- Dates: March 27–30, 1997
- Location: Ponte Vedra Beach, Florida; 30.198°N 81.394°W
- Courses: TPC Sawgrass, Stadium Course
- Tour: PGA Tour

Statistics
- Par: 72
- Length: 6,896 yards (6,306 m)
- Field: 144 players, 76 after cut
- Cut: 146 (+2)
- Prize fund: $3.5 million
- Winner's share: $630,000

Champion
- (Australia) Steve Elkington
- 272 (−16)

Location map
- Location in the United States Location in Florida

The 1997 Players Championship was a golf tournament in Florida on the PGA Tour, held March 27–30 at TPC Sawgrass in Ponte Vedra Beach, southeast of Jacksonville. It was the 24th Players Championship.

== Tournament summary ==
Steve Elkington led wire-to-wire, with all four rounds in the sixties, to win his second Players at 272 (−16), a record seven strokes ahead of runner-up Scott Hoch. Elkington's previous win was six years earlier in 1991.

In his first Players, 21-year-old Tiger Woods tied for 31st at 289 (+1); two weeks later, he won the Masters by a record margin.

Defending champion Fred Couples finished thirteen strokes back, in a tie for tenth place.

== Venue ==
This was the sixteenth Players Championship held at the TPC at Sawgrass Stadium Course, and it remained at 6,896 yards (6,306 m).

== Eligibility requirements ==
All winners of PGA Tour events awarding official money and official victory status in the preceding 12 months, concluding with the Bay Hill Invitational and dating from the 1996 Players Championship.

Fred Couples, Paul Stankowski, Nick Faldo, Loren Roberts, Mark O'Meara, Mark Brooks, Phil Mickelson, Corey Pavin, Steve Stricker, Tom Watson, Ernie Els, Steve Jones, John Cook, D. A. Weibring, Scott Hoch, Tom Lehman, Willie Wood, Justin Leonard, Clarence Rose, Guy Boros, Dudley Hart, Ed Fiori???, Fred Funk, Michael Bradley, Tiger Woods, David Ogrin, Jeff Sluman, Steve Elkington, Stuart Appleby

The top 125 PGA Tour members from the final 1996 Official Money List.

Davis Love III, Brad Faxon, David Duval, Kenny Perry, Greg Norman, Tommy Tolles, Vijay Singh, Jeff Maggert, Jim Furyk, Mark Calcavecchia, Duffy Waldorf, Lee Janzen, Woody Austin, Payne Stewart, Bob Tway, Jay Haas, John Huston, Mark McCumber, Tim Herron, Rocco Mediate, Craig Parry, Paul Goydos, Billy Andrade, Colin Montgomerie, Scott McCarron, Nick Price, Tom Purtzer, Jesper Parnevik, David Frost, Billy Mayfair, Fuzzy Zoeller, Jay Don Blake, Craig Stadler, Jerry Kelly, Andrew Magee, Greg Kraft, Russ Cochran, Lennie Clements, John Morse, Kirk Triplett, Tom Kite, Larry Mize, Scott Simpson, Kelly Gibson, Larry Nelson, Nolan Henke, Grant Waite, Glen Day, Emlyn Aubrey, Jim Gallagher Jr., Joey Sindelar, Rick Fehr, Patrick Burke, Steve Lowery, Frank Nobilo, Marco Dawson, Mike Brisky, Gil Morgan, John Adams, Brad Bryant, Robert Gamez, Joel Edwards, Ronnie Black, Len Mattiace, Mike Hulbert, Brandel Chamblee, Paul Azinger, Phil Blackmar, Brad Fabel, Chip Beck, Joe Ozaki, Olin Browne, Jim Carter, Taylor Smith, Doug Martin, Neal Lancaster, David Toms, David Edwards, Mark Wiebe, Wayne Levi, Hal Sutton, Pete Jordan, Lee Rinker, Chris Perry, John Maginnes, Hugh Royer III, John Wilson, Curtis Strange, Blaine McCallister, Scott Gump, Ben Crenshaw, Dave Stockton Jr., John Daly, Omar Uresti, Dan Forsman, Scott Dunlap, Dicky Pride

Winners in the last 10 calendar years of The Players Championship, Masters Tournament, U.S. Open, PGA Championship, and NEC World Series of Golf.

Sandy Lyle, Ian Woosnam, Bernhard Langer, Wayne Grady, Mike Reid, Fulton Allem

British Open winners since 1990.

Eight players, not otherwise eligible, designated by The Players Championship Committee as "special selections."

Costantino Rocca, Sam Torrance, Robert Allenby, Mark McNulty, Masashi Ozaki, Brian Watts

Any players, not otherwise eligible, who are among the top 10 money winners from the 1997 Official Money List through the Bay Hill Invitational

To complete a field of 144 players, those players in order, not otherwise eligible, from the 1997 Official Money List through the Bay Hill Invitational.

== Field ==
Robert Damron, Joe Durant, Donnie Hammond, Brian Henninger, Peter Jacobsen, Don Pooley, Ted Tryba

== Round summaries ==
=== First round ===
Thursday, March 27, 1997

Place	Player	Score	To par
1	(Australia) Steve Elkington	66	−6
T2	(United States) Mark Calcavecchia	67	−5
T2	(United States) Russ Cochran	67	−5
T2	(United States) David Edwards	67	−5
T2	(United States) Tom Lehman	67	−5
T2	(United States) Fuzzy Zoeller	67	−5
T7	(United States) Billy Andrade	68	−4
T7	(United States) Michael Bradley	68	−4
T7	(South Africa) Ernie Els	68	−4
T7	(United States) Jay Haas	68	−4
T7	(Scotland) Sandy Lyle	68	−4
T7	(United States) Larry Mize	68	−4
T7	(Japan) Naomichi Ozaki	68	−4
T7	(United States) Tom Purtzer	68	−4
T7	(United States) Taylor Smith	68	−4
T7	(United States) Dave Stockton	68	−4

=== Second round ===
Friday, March 28, 1997

Place	Player	Score	To par
1	(Australia) Steve Elkington	66-69=135	−9
2	(United States) Larry Mize	68-68=136	−8
T3	(United States) David Edwards	67-70=137	−7
T3	(United States) Tommy Tolles	70-67=137	−7
T3	(United States) Tom Lehman	67-71=138	−6
T3	(United States) Davis Love III	72-66=138	−6
T3	(Australia) Craig Parry	71-67=138	−6
T3	(United States) Brian Watts	70-68=138	−6
T7	(South Africa) Ernie Els	68-71=139	−5
T7	(United States) Brad Faxon	70-69=139	−5
T7	(United States) Tom Purtzer	68-71=139	−5
T7	(United States) Dave Stockton	68-71=139	−5
T7	(United States) Kirk Triplett	71-68=139	−5
T7	(United States) Fuzzy Zoeller	67-72=139	−5

=== Third round ===
Saturday, March 29, 1997

Place	Player	Score	To par
1	(Australia) Steve Elkington	66-69-68=203	−13
2	(United States) Scott Hoch	69-71-65=205	−11
T3	(United States) Billy Andrade	68-72-68=208	−8
T3	(United States) Tom Purtzer	68-71-69=208	−8
5	(United States) Kirk Triplett	71-68-70=209	−7
T6	(United States) Mark Brooks	72-68-70=210	−6
T6	(United States) Larry Mize	68-68-74=210	−6
T6	(United States) Tommy Tolles	70-67-73=210	−6
T9	(South Africa) Ernie Els	68-71-72=211	−5
T9	(United States) Brad Faxon	70-69-72=211	−5
T9	(United States) Robert Gamez	70-73-68=211	−5
T9	(United States) Tom Lehman	67-71-73=211	−5
T9	(United States) Davis Love III	72-66-73=211	−5
T9	(Scotland) Colin Montgomerie	70-70-71=211	−5
T9	(United States) Loren Roberts	70-74-67=211	−5

=== Final round ===
Sunday, March 30, 1997

Champion
(c) = past champion

Place	Player	Score	To par	Money ($)
1	(Australia) Steve Elkington (c)	66-69-68-69=272	−16	630,000
2	(United States) Scott Hoch	69-71-65-74=279	−9	378,000
3	(United States) Loren Roberts	70-74-67-69=280	−8	238,000
4	(United States) Brad Faxon	70-69-72-70=281	−7	168,000
5	(United States) Billy Andrade	68-72-68-74=282	−6	140,000
6	(United States) Tom Lehman	67-71-73-72=283	−5	126,000
T7	(United States) Mark Brooks	72-68-70-74=284	−4	109,083
T7	(Scotland) Colin Montgomerie	70-70-71-73=284	−4	109,083
T7	(United States) Tommy Tolles	70-67-73-74=284	−4	109,083
T10	(United States) Russ Cochran	67-74-72-72=285	−3	84,000
T10	(United States) Fred Couples (c)	71-74-71-69=285	−3	84,000
T10	(South Africa) Ernie Els	68-71-72-74=285	−3	84,000
T10	(United States) Kirk Triplett	71-68-70-76=285	−3	84,000

Leaderboard below the top 10
Place	Player	Score	To par	Money ($)
T14	(Australia) Stuart Appleby	71-71-70-74=286	−2	54,250
T14	(United States) Paul Azinger	72-72-71-71=286	−2	54,250
T14	(United States) Michael Bradley	68-74-72-72=286	−2	54,250
T14	(United States) David Edwards	67-70-76-73=286	−2	54,250
T14	(United States) Fred Funk	71-75-68-72=286	−2	54,250
T14	(United States) Larry Mize	68-68-74-76=286	−2	54,250
T14	(United States) Paul Stankowski	73-70-71-72=286	−2	54,250
T14	(United States) Fuzzy Zoeller	67-72-73-74=286	−2	54,250
T22	(United States) John Cook	73-69-72-73=287	−1	37,800
T22	(Australia) Craig Parry	71-67-80-69=287	−1	37,800
T24	(United States) Mark Calcavecchia	67-75-71-75=288	E	27,700
T24	(England) Nick Faldo	71-72-73-72=288	E	27,700
T24	(United States) Robert Gamez	70-73-68-77=288	E	27,700
T24	(United States) Doug Martin	72-71-75-70=288	E	27,700
T24	(United States) Len Mattiace	71-72-71-74=288	E	27,700
T24	(Zimbabwe) Nick Price (c)	75-68-74-71=288	E	27,700
T24	(United States) Tom Purtzer	68-71-69-80=288	E	27,700
T31	(United States) Rick Fehr	74-67-75-73=289	+1	20,300
T31	(Germany) Bernhard Langer	71-73-75-70=289	+1	20,300
T31	(United States) Chris Perry	74-71-70-74=289	+1	20,300
T31	(United States) Joey Sindelar	71-73-73-72=289	+1	20,300
T31	(Fiji) Vijay Singh	71-69-74-75=289	+1	20,300
T31	(United States) Tiger Woods	71-73-72-73=289	+1	20,300
T37	(United States) Nolan Henke	72-73-73-72=290	+2	15,400
T37	(United States) Lee Janzen (c)	73-73-74-70=290	+2	15,400
T37	(United States) Pete Jordan	72-74-73-71=290	+2	15,400
T37	(United States) Justin Leonard	71-71-70-78=290	+2	15,400
T37	(United States) Brian Watts	70-68-74-78=290	+2	15,400
T37	(United States) Willie Wood	74-71-70-75=290	+2	15,400
T43	(United States) David Duval	74-69-74-74=291	+3	11,550
T43	(United States) Jay Haas	68-76-74-73=291	+3	11,550
T43	(Zimbabwe) Mark McNulty	71-73-69-78=291	+3	11,550
T43	(Italy) Costantino Rocca	74-69-73-75=291	+3	11,550
T43	(United States) Duffy Waldorf	71-70-75-75=291	+3	11,550
T48	(United States) Peter Jacobsen	75-71-73-73=292	+4	9,345
T48	(United States) Omar Uresti	73-69-72-78=292	+4	9,345
T50	(Japan) Masashi Ozaki	70-76-71-76=293	+5	8,610
T50	(United States) Dave Stockton Jr.	68-71-77-77=293	+5	8,610
T50	(United States) Hal Sutton (c)	70-71-74-78=293	+5	8,610
T53	(United States) Phil Blackmar	71-74-74-75=294	+6	7,953
T53	(United States) Robert Damron	69-72-78-75=294	+6	7,953
T53	(United States) Jim Furyk	71-74-70-79=294	+6	7,953
T53	(United States) Andrew Magee	71-71-76-76=294	+6	7,953
T53	(United States) Gil Morgan	71-72-73-78=294	+6	7,953
T53	(Australia) Greg Norman (c)	71-72-72-79=294	+6	7,953
T53	(United States) Taylor Smith	68-73-76-77=294	+6	7,953
T53	(United States) Tom Watson	70-71-79-74=294	+6	7,953
61	(United States) Glen Day	70-72-76-77=295	+7	7,630
T62	(United States) Jay Don Blake	73-72-72-79=296	+8	7,490
T62	(United States) Mike Hulbert	70-71-77-78=296	+8	7,490
T62	(United States) Mike Reid	71-74-74-77=296	+8	7,490
T65	(United States) Scott Gump	71-75-72-79=297	+9	7,280
T65	(United States) Steve Lowery	73-72-74-78=297	+9	7,280
T65	(Japan) Naomichi Ozaki	68-74-74-81=297	+9	7,280
T68	(United States) John Huston	72-70-77-79=298	+10	7,105
T68	(United States) Don Pooley	71-74-71-82=298	+10	7,105
T70	(United States) Jim Gallagher Jr.	72-74-75-78=299	+11	6,930
T70	(Scotland) Sandy Lyle (c)	68-74-77-80=299	+11	6,930
T70	(United States) Mark O'Meara	73-72-76-78=299	+11	6,930
73	(United States) Mike Brisky	71-71-80-79=301	+13	6,790
74	(United States) John Wilson	70-74-79-79=302	+14	6,720
75	(United States) Lee Rinker	74-72-77-81=304	+16	6,650
CUT	(United States) Emlyn Aubrey	74-73=147	+3	
CUT	(United States) Jim Carter	72-75=147	+3	
CUT	(United States) Kelly Gibson	71-76=147	+3	
CUT	(United States) Brian Henninger	75-72=147	+3	
CUT	(United States) Neal Lancaster	74-73=147	+3	
CUT	(United States) Billy Mayfair	74-73=147	+3	
CUT	(United States) Rocco Mediate	72-75=147	+3	
CUT	(United States) Corey Pavin	75-72=147	+3	
CUT	(United States) Payne Stewart	69-78=147	+3	
CUT	(United States) Bob Tway	74-73=147	+3	
CUT	(United States) John Adams	74-74=148	+4	
CUT	(United States) Olin Browne	73-75=148	+4	
CUT	(United States) Marco Dawson	74-74=148	+4	
CUT	(United States) Joel Edwards	71-77=148	+4	
CUT	(United States) Tom Kite (c)	75-73=148	+4	
CUT	(United States) Greg Kraft	73-75=148	+4	
CUT	(United States) John Maginnes	74-74=148	+4	
CUT	(United States) Scott Simpson	71-77=148	+4	
CUT	(United States) Jeff Sluman	78-70=148	+4	
CUT	(United States) Ted Tryba	72-76=148	+4	
CUT	(United States) Mark Wiebe	74-74=148	+4	
CUT	(United States) Brandel Chamblee	73-76=149	+5	
CUT	(United States) Lennie Clements	74-75=149	+5	
CUT	(United States) Dudley Hart	76-73=149	+5	
CUT	(United States) Scott McCarron	73-76=149	+5	
CUT	(United States) John Morse	74-75=149	+5	
CUT	(United States) Kenny Perry	73-76=149	+5	
CUT	(United States) Craig Stadler	73-76=149	+5	
CUT	(United States) Steve Stricker	74-75=149	+5	
CUT	(Scotland) Sam Torrance	78-71=149	+5	
CUT	(New Zealand) Grant Waite	78-71=149	+5	
CUT	(United States) Paul Goydos	77-73=150	+6	
CUT	(United States) Donnie Hammond	74-76=150	+6	
CUT	(United States) Steve Jones	73-77=150	+6	
CUT	(United States) David Ogrin	77-73=150	+6	
CUT	(Sweden) Jesper Parnevik	75-75=150	+6	
CUT	(United States) Dicky Pride	75-75=150	+6	
CUT	(United States) Woody Austin	76-75=151	+7	
CUT	(United States) Scott Dunlap	75-76=151	+7	
CUT	(United States) Joe Durant	73-78=151	+7	
CUT	(United States) Dan Forsman	76-75=151	+7	
CUT	(United States) Tim Herron	75-76=151	+7	
CUT	(United States) Mark McCumber (c)	77-74=151	+7	
CUT	(United States) Ronnie Black	78-74=152	+8	
CUT	(United States) Larry Nelson	73-79=152	+8	
CUT	(New Zealand) Frank Nobilo	74-78=152	+8	
CUT	(United States) Hugh Royer III	77-75=152	+8	
CUT	(United States) Brad Bryant	75-78=153	+9	
CUT	(United States) Wayne Levi	76-77=153	+9	
CUT	(United States) Phil Mickelson	77-76=153	+9	
CUT	(United States) David Toms	77-76=153	+9	
CUT	(United States) D. A. Weibring	77-76=153	+9	
CUT	(United States) Jerry Kelly	79-75=154	+10	
CUT	(United States) Jeff Maggert	76-78=154	+10	
CUT	(United States) Blaine McCallister	74-80=154	+10	
CUT	(United States) Clarence Rose	74-80=154	+10	
CUT	(Australia) Wayne Grady	80-75=155	+11	
CUT	(United States) Curtis Strange	81-74=155	+11	
CUT	(United States) Brad Fabel	78-78=156	+12	
CUT	(South Africa) Fulton Allem	80-77=157	+13	
CUT	(United States) Chip Beck	77-80=157	+13	
CUT	(Australia) Robert Allenby	83-77=160	+16	
CUT	(United States) Ben Crenshaw	81-79=160	+16	
WD	(United States) Guy Boros	74	+2	
WD	(United States) John Daly	76	+4	
WD	(Wales) Ian Woosnam	76	+4	
WD	(United States) Patrick Burke	80	+8	
WD	(South Africa) David Frost	81	+9	
DQ	(United States) Davis Love III (c)	72-66-73=211	−5	
