= 1991 Players Championship =

Tournament information
- Dates: March 28–31, 1991
- Location: Ponte Vedra Beach, Florida; 30.198°N 81.394°W
- Courses: TPC Sawgrass, Stadium Course
- Tour: PGA Tour

Statistics
- Par: 72
- Length: 6,896 yards (6,306 m)
- Field: 144 players, 77 after cut
- Cut: 145 (+1)
- Prize fund: $1.6 million
- Winner's share: $288,000

Champion
- (Australia) Steve Elkington
- 276 (−12)

Location map
- Location in the United States Location in Florida

The 1991 Players Championship was a golf tournament in Florida on the PGA Tour, held March 28–31 at TPC Sawgrass in Ponte Vedra Beach, southeast of Jacksonville. It was the eighteenth Players Championship.

Steve Elkington birdied the final hole to win the title at 276 (−12), one stroke ahead of runner-up Fuzzy Zoeller. Elkington won a second Players six years later in 1997.

Defending champion Jodie Mudd missed the 36-hole cut by five strokes.

== Venue ==
This was the tenth Players Championship held at the TPC at Sawgrass Stadium Course, set at 6,896 yards (6,306 m) for a second year.

== Eligibility requirements ==
1. The top 125 PGA Tour members from the Final 1990 Official Money List:

John Adams, Fulton Allem, Billy Andrade, Tommy Armour III, Paul Azinger, Ian Baker-Finch, Dave Barr, Andy Bean, Chip Beck, Phil Blackmar, Jay Don Blake, Jim Booros, Bill Britton, Mark Brooks, Billy Ray Brown, Brad Bryant, Tom Byrum, Mark Calcavecchia, David Canipe, Brian Claar, Keith Clearwater, Russ Cochran, John Cook, Fred Couples, Ben Crenshaw, Jay Delsing, Mike Donald, Ed Dougherty, Bob Eastwood, David Edwards, Steve Elkington, Bob Estes, Brad Fabel, Brad Faxon, Rick Fehr, Dan Forsman, David Frost, Fred Funk, Jim Gallagher Jr., Robert Gamez, Buddy Gardner, Bob Gilder, Bill Glasson, Wayne Grady, Ken Green, Jay Haas, Gary Hallberg, Jim Hallet, Donnie Hammond, Morris Hatalsky, Nolan Henke, Scott Hoch, Mike Hulbert, John Huston, Hale Irwin, Peter Jacobsen, Lee Janzen, Steve Jones, Tom Kite, Kenny Knox, Wayne Levi, Bruce Lietzke, Bob Lohr, Davis Love III, Mark Lye, Andrew Magee, John Mahaffey, Billy Mayfair, Blaine McCallister, Mark McCumber, Rocco Mediate, Larry Mize, Gil Morgan, Jodie Mudd, Larry Nelson, Greg Norman, Mark O'Meara, Steve Pate, Corey Pavin, David Peoples, Chris Perry, Kenny Perry, Peter Persons, Don Pooley, Nick Price, Tom Purtzer, Larry Rinker, Loren Roberts, Bill Sander, Gene Sauers, Ted Schulz, Tom Sieckmann, Tim Simpson, Joey Sindelar, Mike Smith, Craig Stadler, Ray Stewart, Curtis Strange, Hal Sutton, Brian Tennyson, Doug Tewell, Jim Thorpe, Kirk Triplett, Bob Tway, Howard Twitty, Stan Utley, Scott Verplank, Bobby Wadkins, Lanny Wadkins, Tom Watson, D. A. Weibring, Mark Wiebe, Bob Wolcott, Willie Wood, Jim Woodward, Robert Wrenn, Fuzzy Zoeller, Richard Zokol

Emlyn Aubrey, Payne Stewart, Raymond Floyd, Mike Reid, Tony Sills, Scott Simpson, and Jeff Sluman elected not to play

2. Designated players:

3. Any foreign player meeting the requirements of a designated player, whether or not he is a PGA Tour member:

Sandy Lyle, Ian Woosnam, Nick Faldo, José María Olazábal

4. Winners in the last 10 calendar years of The Players Championship, Masters Tournament, U.S. Open, PGA Championship, and World Series of Golf:

David Graham, Jerry Pate, Seve Ballesteros, Calvin Peete, Bernhard Langer Andy North, Hubert Green, Roger Maltbie

5. British Open winners since 1990:

6. Six players, not otherwise eligible, designated by The Players Championship Committee as "special selections":

Mark Hayes, Masashi Ozaki, Peter Senior, Craig Parry, Denis Watson, Mark McNulty

7. To complete a field of 144 players, those players in order, not otherwise eligible, from the 1991 Official Money List, as of the completion of the USF&G Classic:

Dan Halldorson, Dave Rummells, Bart Bryant, John Daly, Jeff Maggert, Neal Lancaster, Dan Pohl

General Source:

== Round summaries ==
=== First round ===
Thursday, March 28, 1991

Place	Player	Score	To par
1	(United States) Bob Tway	65	−7
T2	(United States) Russ Cochran	66	−6
T2	(United States) Bob Eastwood	66	−6
T2	(Australia) Steve Elkington	66	−6
T2	(United States) Peter Persons	66	−6
T6	(United States) Paul Azinger	67	−5
T6	(United States) Phil Blackmar	67	−5
T6	(United States) Jay Don Blake	67	−5
T6	(United States) Blaine McCallister	67	−5
T6	(United States) Mike Smith	67	−5
T6	(United States) D. A. Weibring	67	−5

=== Second round ===
Friday, March 29, 1991

Place	Player	Score	To par
1	(United States) Paul Azinger	67-68=135	−9
T2	(Australia) Steve Elkington	66-70=136	−8
T2	(United States) Fuzzy Zoeller	68-68=136	−8
4	(Australia) Ian Baker-Finch	69-69=138	−6
T5	(United States) Billy Andrade	68-71=139	−5
T5	(United States) Phil Blackmar	67-72=139	−5
T5	(United States) Brian Claar	70-69=139	−5
T5	(United States) Bob Lohr	68-71=139	−5
T5	(United States) Chris Perry	68-71=139	−5
T5	(United States) Curtis Strange	71-68=139	−5
T5	(United States) Kirk Triplett	68-71=139	−5
T5	(United States) Willie Wood	71-68=139	−5

=== Third round ===
Saturday, March 30, 1991

Place	Player	Score	To par
1	(United States) Paul Azinger	67-68-69=204	−12
2	(United States) Fuzzy Zoeller	68-68-69=205	−11
T3	(United States) Bob Lohr	68-71-68=207	−9
T3	(United States) Tom Watson	68-74-65=207	−9
T5	(United States) Phil Blackmar	67-72-69=208	−8
T5	(United States) Brian Claar	70-69-69=208	−8
T5	(Australia) Steve Elkington	66-70-72=208	−8
T8	(Australia) Ian Baker-Finch	69-69-71=209	−7
T8	(United States) Curtis Strange	71-68-70=209	−7
T10	(United States) Ed Dougherty	71-70-69=210	−6
T10	(United States) Chris Perry	68-71-71=210	−6
T10	(Zimbabwe) Nick Price	68-75-67=210	−6
T10	(United States) Gene Sauers	68-74-68=210	−6
T10	(United States) Joey Sindelar	68-75-67=210	−6

=== Final round ===
Sunday, March 31, 1991

Champion
(c) = past champion

Place	Player	Score	To par	Money ($)
1	(Australia) Steve Elkington	66-70-72-68=276	−12	288,000
2	(United States) Fuzzy Zoeller	68-68-69-72=277	−11	172,800
T3	(United States) Paul Azinger	67-68-69-74=278	−10	83,200
T3	(United States) Phil Blackmar	67-72-69-70=278	−10	83,200
T3	(United States) John Cook	71-73-69-65=278	−10	83,200
T6	(Germany) Bernhard Langer	70-70-71-69=280	−8	53,600
T6	(United States) Bruce Lietzke	71-72-68-69=280	−8	53,600
T6	(United States) Curtis Strange	71-68-70-71=280	−8	53,600
T9	(United States) Bob Lohr	68-71-68-74=281	−7	41,600
T9	(Zimbabwe) Nick Price	68-75-67-71=281	−7	41,600
T9	(United States) Gene Sauers	68-74-68-71=281	−7	41,600
T9	(United States) Bobby Wadkins	68-74-69-70=281	−7	41,600

Leaderboard below the top 10
Place	Player	Score	To par	Money ($)
T13	(United States) Jay Delsing	71-71-71-69=282	−6	32,000
T13	(United States) Mark McCumber (c)	70-72-69-71=282	−6	32,000
T15	(United States) Keith Clearwater	72-72-70-69=283	−5	25,600
T15	(United States) John Huston	72-71-70-70=283	−5	25,600
T15	(United States) Rocco Mediate	69-74-68-72=283	−5	25,600
T15	(Australia) Craig Parry	70-74-69-70=283	−5	25,600
T15	(Wales) Ian Woosnam	72-69-70-72=283	−5	25,600
T20	(United States) Bob Eastwood	66-74-71-73=284	−4	19,306
T20	(United States) Neal Lancaster	71-73-69-71=284	−4	19,306
T20	(United States) Tom Watson	68-74-65-77=284	−4	19,306
T23	(United States) Fred Couples (c)	70-74-69-72=285	−3	14,720
T23	(United States) Blaine McCallister	67-75-70-73=285	−3	14,720
T23	(Zimbabwe) Mark McNulty	70-72-72-71=285	−3	14,720
T23	(United States) Larry Nelson	72-72-70-71=285	−3	14,720
T27	(United States) Billy Andrade	68-71-74-73=286	−2	9,394
T27	(United States) Jay Don Blake	67-75-75-69=286	−2	9,394
T27	(United States) Bill Britton	69-71-74-72=286	−2	9,394
T27	(United States) Billy Ray Brown	72-73-69-72=286	−2	9,394
T27	(United States) Ed Dougherty	71-70-69-76=286	−2	9,394
T27	(United States) Ken Green	69-76-71-70=286	−2	9,394
T27	(United States) Hale Irwin	68-74-69-75=286	−2	9,394
T27	(United States) Andy North	72-72-70-72=286	−2	9,394
T27	(Japan) Masashi Ozaki	73-72-72-69=286	−2	9,394
T27	(United States) Steve Pate	69-73-70-74=286	−2	9,394
T27	(United States) Chris Perry	68-71-71-76=286	−2	9,394
T27	(United States) Peter Persons	66-75-71-74=286	−2	9,394
T27	(United States) Loren Roberts	69-73-71-73=286	−2	9,394
T27	(United States) Robert Wrenn	70-72-73-71=286	−2	9,394
T41	(Australia) Ian Baker-Finch	69-69-71-78=287	−1	5,064
T41	(United States) Brian Claar	70-69-69-79=287	−1	5,064
T41	(United States) David Edwards	71-73-70-73=287	−1	5,064
T41	(South Africa) David Frost	69-71-72-75=287	−1	5,064
T41	(United States) Buddy Gardner	70-71-74-72=287	−1	5,064
T41	(United States) Bill Glasson	72-70-72-73=287	−1	5,064
T41	(United States) Steve Jones	71-70-71-75=287	−1	5,064
T41	(United States) Corey Pavin	69-76-71-71=287	−1	5,064
T41	(United States) Joey Sindelar	68-75-67-77=287	−1	5,064
T41	(United States) Bob Tway	65-77-72-73=287	−1	5,064
T41	(United States) D. A. Weibring	67-74-72-74=287	−1	5,064
T52	(United States) John Adams	69-75-72-72=288	E	3,731
T52	(United States) Chip Beck	70-73-71-74=288	E	3,731
T52	(United States) Mark Hayes (c)	71-73-73-71=288	E	3,731
T52	(United States) Larry Rinker	74-71-70-73=288	E	3,731
T52	(United States) Tim Simpson	72-73-67-76=288	E	3,731
T57	(United States) Mike Donald	71-72-74-72=289	+1	3,552
T57	(England) Nick Faldo	72-72-71-74=289	+1	3,552
T57	(United States) Kenny Knox	73-71-77-68=289	+1	3,552
T57	(United States) Mark Lye	72-73-69-75=289	+1	3,552
T57	(United States) Kenny Perry	74-70-75-70=289	+1	3,552
62	(United States) Lanny Wadkins (c)	70-75-70-75=290	+2	3,456
T63	(Spain) Seve Ballesteros	72-72-73-74=291	+3	3,360
T63	(United States) Jim Booros	72-72-73-74=291	+3	3,360
T63	(Australia) Greg Norman	75-70-70-76=291	+3	3,360
T63	(United States) Bob Wolcott	69-75-74-73=291	+3	3,360
T63	(United States) Willie Wood	71-68-74-78=291	+3	3,360
T68	(Canada) Ray Stewart	70-73-76-73=292	+4	3,232
T68	(United States) Hal Sutton (c)	72-73-73-74=292	+4	3,232
T68	(United States) Kirk Triplett	68-71-79-74=292	+4	3,232
71	(United States) Tommy Armour III	71-74-74-74=293	+5	3,168
72	(United States) David Peoples	71-73-75-75=294	+6	3,136
T73	(United States) Billy Mayfair	70-75-74-76=295	+7	3,088
T73	(United States) Stan Utley	73-71-69-82=295	+7	3,088
75	(United States) Dan Forsman	71-74-76-78=299	+11	3,040
76	(United States) Calvin Peete (c)	73-72-78-79=302	+14	3,008
CUT	(Canada) Dave Barr	69-77=146	+2	
CUT	(United States) Mark Brooks	70-76=146	+2	
CUT	(United States) Jay Haas	69-77=146	+2	
CUT	(United States) Jim Hallet	70-76=146	+2	
CUT	(United States) Andrew Magee	71-75=146	+2	
CUT	(United States) John Mahaffey (c)	72-74=146	+2	
CUT	(United States) Roger Maltbie	72-74=146	+2	
CUT	(United States) Dave Rummells	75-71=146	+2	
CUT	(United States) Jeff Sluman	69-77=146	+2	
CUT	(United States) Craig Stadler	72-74=146	+2	
CUT	(United States) Mark Wiebe	73-73=146	+2	
CUT	(South Africa) Fulton Allem	75-72=147	+3	
CUT	(United States) Brad Bryant	72-75=147	+3	
CUT	(United States) Brad Faxon	71-76=147	+3	
CUT	(United States) Fred Funk	73-74=147	+3	
CUT	(United States) Jim Gallagher Jr.	72-75=147	+3	
CUT	(Australia) Wayne Grady	71-76=147	+3	
CUT	(United States) Hubert Green	70-77=147	+3	
CUT	(United States) Donnie Hammond	70-77=147	+3	
CUT	(United States) Nolan Henke	71-76=147	+3	
CUT	(United States) Lee Janzen	73-74=147	+3	
CUT	(Scotland) Sandy Lyle (c)	72-75=147	+3	
CUT	(United States) Larry Mize	73-74=147	+3	
CUT	(United States) Mark O'Meara	71-76=147	+3	
CUT	(United States) Mike Smith	67-80=147	+3	
CUT	(Zimbabwe) Denis Watson	73-74=147	+3	
CUT	(United States) Mark Calcavecchia	71-77=148	+4	
CUT	(United States) Ben Crenshaw	73-75=148	+4	
CUT	(United States) Rick Fehr	70-78=148	+4	
CUT	(United States) Tom Kite (c)	77-71=148	+4	
CUT	(Spain) José María Olazábal	74-74=148	+4	
CUT	(United States) Bart Bryant	75-74=149	+5	
CUT	(United States) Brad Fabel	74-75=149	+5	
CUT	(United States) Morris Hatalsky	72-77=149	+5	
CUT	(United States) Scott Hoch	71-78=149	+5	
CUT	(United States) Dan Pohl	70-79=149	+5	
CUT	(United States) Tom Purtzer	71-78=149	+5	
CUT	(United States) Bill Sander	70-79=149	+5	
CUT	(United States) Brian Tennyson	75-74=149	+5	
CUT	(United States) Doug Tewell	71-78=149	+5	
CUT	(United States) David Canipe	76-74=150	+6	
CUT	(United States) Bob Estes	72-78=150	+6	
CUT	(United States) Wayne Levi	75-75=150	+6	
CUT	(United States) Davis Love III	71-79=150	+6	
CUT	(United States) Jodie Mudd (c)	75-75=150	+6	
CUT	(United States) Howard Twitty	73-77=150	+6	
CUT	(United States) Andy Bean	73-78=151	+7	
CUT	(United States) Tom Byrum	75-76=151	+7	
CUT	(United States) Robert Gamez	76-75=151	+7	
CUT	(Canada) Dan Halldorson	72-79=151	+7	
CUT	(United States) Mike Hulbert	72-79=151	+7	
CUT	(United States) Gil Morgan	72-79=151	+7	
CUT	(United States) Jerry Pate (c)	72-79=151	+7	
CUT	(United States) Ted Schulz	72-79=151	+7	
CUT	(United States) Bob Gilder	69-83=152	+8	
CUT	(United States) Gary Hallberg	73-79=152	+8	
CUT	(United States) Jeff Maggert	75-77=152	+8	
CUT	(United States) Jim Thorpe	76-76=152	+8	
CUT	(United States) Jim Woodward	73-79=152	+8	
CUT	(United States) John Daly	73-81=154	+10	
CUT	(United States) Peter Jacobsen	74-80=154	+10	
CUT	(Australia) Peter Senior	78-76=154	+10	
CUT	(United States) Tom Sieckmann	75-81=156	+12	
CUT	(Australia) David Graham	76-81=157	+13	
CUT	(Canada) Richard Zokol	76-85=161	+17	
CUT	(United States) Scott Verplank	84-79=163	+19	
WD	(United States) Russ Cochran	66-78-79=223	+7	
WD	(United States) Don Pooley	72-77=149	+5	
