= 1984 Masters Tournament =

- Front cover of the 1984 Masters Guide

Tournament information
- Dates: April 12–15, 1984
- Location: Augusta, Georgia; 33.503°N 82.020°W
- Course: Augusta National Golf Club
- Organized by: Augusta National Golf Club
- Tour: PGA Tour

Statistics
- Par: 72
- Length: 6,905 yards (6,314 m)
- Field: 88 players, 47 after cut
- Cut: 146 (+2)
- Prize fund: $612,900
- Winner's share: $108,000

Champion
- (United States) Ben Crenshaw
- 277 (−11)
- Location in the United States Location in Georgia

The 1984 Masters Tournament was the 48th Masters Tournament, held April 12–15 at Augusta National Golf Club in Augusta, Georgia. Ben Crenshaw won the first of his two major titles, both Masters, two strokes ahead of runner-up Tom Watson, the winner in 1977 and 1981.

The leader after 36 holes was Masters rookie Mark Lye at 135 (−9), three strokes ahead of Tom Kite. Play was halted near the end of the third round due to thunderstorms and the final groups completed it on Sunday morning. After 54 holes, Kite led at 207 (−9) and Lye was a stroke back. Crenshaw was two strokes back at 209 and shot a final round 68 (−4) to slip on his first green jacket. He won again eleven years later in 1995.

Defending champion Seve Ballesteros was assessed a two-stroke penalty in the second round for grounding his club within the confines of a water hazard at the 13th hole and missed the cut by a stroke. He also missed the cut as defending champion in 1981.

Normally scheduled to conclude on the second Sunday of April, this Masters was held a week later, as was 1979.

== Course ==
Hole	Name	Yards	Par	Hole	Name	Yards	Par
1	Tea Olive	400	4	10	Camellia	485	4
2	Pink Dogwood	555	5	11	White Dogwood	455	4
3	Flowering Peach	360	4	12	Golden Bell	155	3
4	Flowering Crab Apple	205	3	13	Azalea	465	5
5	Magnolia	435	4	14	Chinese Fir	405	4
6	Juniper	180	3	15	Firethorn	500	5
7	Pampas	360	4	16	Redbud	170	3
8	Yellow Jasmine	535	5	17	Nandina	400	4
9	Carolina Cherry	435	4	18	Holly	405	4
Out		3,465	36	In		3,440	36
Source:				Total		6,905	72

== Field ==
1. Masters champions

Tommy Aaron, George Archer (8), Seve Ballesteros (3,8,9,11,12), Gay Brewer, Billy Casper, Charles Coody, Raymond Floyd (4,8,9,12,13), Doug Ford, Bob Goalby, Jack Nicklaus (2,4,10,12), Arnold Palmer, Gary Player, Craig Stadler (8,9,12,13), Art Wall Jr., Tom Watson (2,3,8,9,11,12,13), Fuzzy Zoeller (8,10,11,12,13)

- Jack Burke Jr., Ralph Guldahl, Claude Harmon, Ben Hogan, Herman Keiser, Cary Middlecoff, Byron Nelson, Henry Picard, Gene Sarazen, and Sam Snead did not play.

The following categories only apply to Americans

2. U.S. Open champions (last five years)

Hale Irwin (8,11,12), Larry Nelson (4,9)

3. The Open champions (last five years)

Bill Rogers

4. PGA champions (last five years)

Hal Sutton (9,10,12)

5. 1983 U.S. Amateur semi-finalists

Clark Burroughs (a), Chris Perry (a), Clifton Pierce (a), Jay Sigel (6,7,a)

6. Previous two U.S. Amateur and Amateur champions

7. Members of the 1983 U.S. Walker Cup team

Nathaniel Crosby (a), Rick Fehr (a), William Hoffer (a), Jim Holtgrieve (a), Bob Lewis (a), David Tentis (a), Billy Tuten (a)

- Brad Faxon and Willie Wood forfeited their exemptions by turning professional.

8. Top 24 players and ties from the 1983 Masters Tournament

Ben Crenshaw (11,12,13), Keith Fergus, Mark Hayes, Peter Jacobsen (10,12), Tom Kite (11,12,13), Wayne Levi (11,12), Johnny Miller (12), Gil Morgan (9,12,13), Dan Pohl (10), Jack Renner (11), Scott Simpson (9), J. C. Snead, Lee Trevino, Lanny Wadkins (9,11,12,13), Tom Weiskopf

9. Top 16 players and ties from the 1983 U.S. Open

Chip Beck, Lennie Clements, Ralph Landrum, Pat McGowan (10), Mike Nicolette, Andy North, David Ogrin, Calvin Peete (11,12,13), Jim Thorpe

10. Top eight players and ties from 1983 PGA Championship

John Fought, Bruce Lietzke (11)

11. Winners of PGA Tour events since the previous Masters

Andy Bean (12), Ronnie Black, Rex Caldwell (12), Jim Colbert (12), John Cook (12), Fred Couples (12), Bob Eastwood (12), Danny Edwards, David Edwards, Morris Hatalsky, Gary Koch (12), Pat Lindsey, Mark Lye (12), John Mahaffey, Mark McCumber (12), Larry Mize, Tom Purtzer, Payne Stewart (12), Curtis Strange (12,13)

12. Top 30 players from the 1983 PGA Tour money list

Ed Fiori, Jay Haas (13)

13. Members of the U.S. 1983 Ryder Cup team

Bob Gilder

14. Foreign invitations

Isao Aoki (8), Nick Faldo (8), David Graham (2,4,9,11,12), Bernhard Langer, Tsuneyuki Nakajima (8), Greg Norman, Peter Oosterhuis (8), Philip Parkin (6,a), Nick Price (11)

- Numbers in brackets indicate categories that the player would have qualified under had they been American.

== Round summaries ==
=== First round ===
Thursday, April 12, 1984

Place	Player	Score	To par
1	(United States) Ben Crenshaw	67	−5
2	(United States) Lee Trevino	68	−4
T3	(Japan) Isao Aoki	69	−3
T3	(Australia) David Graham	69	−3
T3	(United States) Mark Lye	69	−3
T3	(United States) Tom Purtzer	69	−3
T7	(United States) George Archer	70	−2
T7	(England) Nick Faldo	70	−2
T7	(United States) Raymond Floyd	70	−2
T7	(United States) Hale Irwin	70	−2
T7	(United States) Tom Kite	70	−2
T7	(United States) Gary Koch	70	−2

=== Second round ===
Friday, April 13, 1984

Place	Player	Score	To par
1	(United States) Mark Lye	69-66=135	−9
2	(United States) Tom Kite	70-68=138	−6
T3	(United States) Ben Crenshaw	67-72=139	−5
T3	(England) Nick Faldo	70-69=139	−5
T3	(Australia) David Graham	69-70=139	−5
T6	(Japan) Isao Aoki	69-72=141	−3
T6	(United States) Andy Bean	71-70=141	−3
T6	(United States) David Edwards	71-70=141	−3
T6	(United States) Hale Irwin	70-71=141	−3
T6	(United States) Larry Mize	71-70=141	−3
T6	(United States) Lee Trevino	68-73=141	−3
T6	(United States) Tom Watson	74-67=141	−3

=== Third round ===
Saturday, April 14, 1984
Sunday, April 15, 1984

The third round had an hour-long weather delay and another thunderstorm hit shortly after 6 pm EST, which halted play for the day. Nineteen players did not complete the round on Saturday; the final pairing of Mark Lye and Tom Kite had just hit their tee shots at the par-3 12th hole. Play was resumed at 8 am on Sunday morning.

Place	Player	Score	To par
1	(United States) Tom Kite	70-68-69=207	−9
2	(United States) Mark Lye	69-66-73=208	−8
T3	(United States) Ben Crenshaw	67-72-70=209	−7
T3	(England) Nick Faldo	70-69-70=209	−7
T3	(Australia) David Graham	69-70-70=209	−7
6	(United States) Tom Watson	74-67-69=210	−6
T7	(United States) Rex Caldwell	71-71-69=211	−5
T7	(United States) Fred Couples	71-73-67=211	−5
T7	(United States) Larry Nelson	76-69-66=211	−5
T10	(United States) Wayne Levi	71-72-69=212	−4
T10	(United States) Larry Mize	71-70-71=212	−4

=== Final round ===
Sunday, April 15, 1984

==== Final leaderboard ====
Champion
Silver Cup winner (low amateur)
(a) = amateur
(c) = past champion

Top 10
Place	Player	Score	To par	Money (US$)
1	(United States) Ben Crenshaw	67-72-70-68=277	−11	108,000
2	(United States) Tom Watson (c)	74-67-69-69=279	−9	64,800
T3	(United States) David Edwards	71-70-72-67=280	−8	34,800
T3	(United States) Gil Morgan	73-71-69-67=280	−8	34,800
5	(United States) Larry Nelson	76-69-66-70=281	−7	24,000
T6	(United States) Ronnie Black	71-74-69-68=282	−6	19,425
T6	(Australia) David Graham	69-70-70-73=282	−6	19,425
T6	(United States) Tom Kite	70-68-69-75=282	−6	19,425
T6	(United States) Mark Lye	69-66-73-74=282	−6	19,425
10	(United States) Fred Couples	71-73-67-72=283	−5	16,200

Leaderboard below the top 10
Place	Player	Score	To par	Money ($)
T11	(United States) Rex Caldwell	71-71-69-73=284	−4	13,200
T11	(United States) Wayne Levi	71-72-69-72=284	−4	13,200
T11	(United States) Larry Mize	71-70-71-72=284	−4	13,200
T11	(United States) Jack Renner	71-73-71-69=284	−4	13,200
T15	(England) Nick Faldo	70-69-70-76=285	−3	10,200
T15	(United States) Raymond Floyd (c)	70-73-70-72=285	−3	10,200
T15	(United States) Calvin Peete	79-66-70-70=285	−3	10,200
T18	(United States) Andy Bean	71-70-72-73=286	−2	8,400
T18	(United States) Danny Edwards	72-71-70-73=286	−2	8,400
T18	(United States) Jack Nicklaus (c)	73-73-70-70=286	−2	8,400
T21	(United States) Jay Haas	74-71-70-72=287	−1	6,475
T21	(United States) Hale Irwin	70-71-74-72=287	−1	6,475
T21	(South Africa) Gary Player (c)	71-72-73-71=287	−1	6,475
T21	(United States) Payne Stewart	76-69-68-74=287	−1	6,475
T25	(Japan) Isao Aoki	69-72-73-74=288	E	4,680
T25	(United States) George Archer (c)	70-74-71-73=288	E	4,680
T25	(United States) Rick Fehr (a)	72-71-70-75=288	E	0
T25	(United States) Peter Jacobsen	72-70-75-71=288	E	4,680
T25	(Australia) Greg Norman	75-71-73-69=288	E	4,680
T25	(United States) Tom Purtzer	69-74-76-69=288	E	4,680
T31	(West Germany) Bernhard Langer	73-70-74-72=289	+1	4,000
T31	(United States) Fuzzy Zoeller (c)	72-73-70-74=289	+1	4,000
T33	(United States) Bruce Lietzke	75-70-75-70=290	+2	3,600
T33	(Japan) Tsuneyuki Nakajima	75-70-70-75=290	+2	3,600
T35	(United States) Gary Koch	70-75-70-76=291	+3	3,100
T35	(United States) Mark McCumber	73-71-74-73=291	+3	3,100
T35	(United States) Dan Pohl	74-71-72-74=291	+3	3,100
T35	(United States) Craig Stadler (c)	74-70-74-73=291	+3	3,100
T35	(United States) Tom Weiskopf	74-71-74-72=291	+3	3,100
40	(United States) Scott Simpson	72-70-76-74=292	+4	2,800
T41	(United States) Bob Lewis (a)	73-70-75-75=293	+5	0
T41	(United States) Andy North	76-68-80-69=293	+5	2,600
43	(United States) Lee Trevino	68-73-74-79=294	+6	2,500
44	(United States) Morris Hatalsky	73-71-75-76=295	+7	2,300
45	(United States) David Ogrin	73-73-76-74=296	+8	2,200
T46	(United States) Clark Burroughs (a)	72-74-75-76=297	+9	0
T46	(United States) Curtis Strange	71-74-75-77=297	+9	2,100
CUT	(Spain) Seve Ballesteros (c)	73-74=147	+3	
CUT	(United States) Charles Coody (c)	75-72=147	+3	
CUT	(United States) John Cook	73-74=147	+3	
CUT	(United States) John Fought	73-74=147	+3	
CUT	(United States) Pat McGowan	72-75=147	+3	
CUT	(England) Peter Oosterhuis	74-73=147	+3	
CUT	(United States) Bill Rogers	76-71=147	+3	
CUT	(United States) Hal Sutton	74-73=147	+3	
CUT	(United States) Chip Beck	74-74=148	+4	
CUT	(United States) Gay Brewer (c)	74-74=148	+4	
CUT	(United States) Lennie Clements	75-73=148	+4	
CUT	(United States) Keith Fergus	74-74=148	+4	
CUT	(United States) John Mahaffey	73-75=148	+4	
CUT	(United States) Nathaniel Crosby (a)	73-76=149	+5	
CUT	(United States) Pat Lindsey	75-74=149	+5	
CUT	(United States) Johnny Miller	74-75=149	+5	
CUT	(United States) J. C. Snead	75-74=149	+5	
CUT	(United States) Jim Thorpe	77-72=149	+5	
CUT	(United States) Jim Colbert	73-77=150	+6	
CUT	(United States) Bob Eastwood	72-78=150	+6	
CUT	(United States) Chris Perry (a)	73-77=150	+6	
CUT	(United States) Clifton Pierce (a)	73-77=150	+6	
CUT	(United States) Billy Casper (c)	73-78=151	+7	
CUT	(United States) Ed Fiori	73-78=151	+7	
CUT	(United States) Jim Holtgrieve (a)	78-73=151	+7	
CUT	(Wales) Philip Parkin (a)	73-78=151	+7	
CUT	(United States) Lanny Wadkins	74-77=151	+7	
CUT	(United States) Tommy Aaron (c)	76-76=152	+8	
CUT	(United States) Bob Gilder	78-74=152	+8	
CUT	(United States) Bob Goalby (c)	79-73=152	+8	
CUT	(United States) Mike Nicolette	76-76=152	+8	
CUT	(United States) David Tentis (a)	74-78=152	+8	
CUT	(United States) Arnold Palmer (c)	77-76=153	+9	
CUT	(Zimbabwe) Nick Price	77-76=153	+9	
CUT	(United States) Mark Hayes	76-78=154	+10	
CUT	(United States) Doug Ford (c)	77-78=155	+11	
CUT	(United States) Jay Sigel (a)	79-76=155	+11	
CUT	(United States) Billy Tuten (a)	80-75=155	+11	
CUT	(United States) Art Wall Jr. (c)	75-81=156	+12	
CUT	(United States) Ralph Landrum	79-78=157	+13	
CUT	(United States) William Hoffer (a)	83-82=165	+21	

==== Scorecard ====
Hole	1	2	3	4	5	6	7	8	9	10	11	12	13	14	15	16	17	18
Par	4	5	4	3	4	3	4	5	4	4	4	3	5	4	5	3	4	4
(United States) Crenshaw	−7	−8	−8	−8	−8	−8	−8	−9	−10	−11	−10	−11	−11	−11	−12	−12	−11	−11
(United States) Watson	−5	−6	−6	−7	−6	−6	−6	−7	−7	−6	−6	−6	−7	−7	−7	−8	−8	−9
(United States) Edwards	−4	−5	−6	−6	−6	−6	−7	−7	−7	−6	−6	−6	−6	−6	−7	−7	−7	−8
(United States) Morgan	−4	−5	−5	−5	−5	−6	−5	−6	−6	−6	−6	−6	−6	−6	−7	−8	−8	−8
(United States) Nelson	−6	−6	−7	−7	−7	−7	−7	−7	−8	−8	−9	−7	−8	−8	−8	−8	−6	−7
(United States) Black	−2	−2	−3	−3	−3	−3	−3	−4	−4	−4	−4	−4	−4	−4	−4	−5	−5	−6
(Australia) Graham	−5	−6	−6	−6	−5	−5	−5	−6	−6	−6	−6	−6	−7	−6	−7	−7	−7	−6
(United States) Kite	−9	−10	−10	−9	−9	−9	−9	−9	−9	−8	−8	−5	−5	−5	−6	−6	−6	−6
(United States) Lye	−9	−9	−8	−8	−6	−6	−6	−7	−8	−7	−6	−6	−6	−6	−6	−6	−6	−6
(United States) Couples	−5	−5	−4	−2	−2	−2	−2	−3	−3	−3	−3	−3	−4	−4	−5	−5	−5	−5

Cumulative tournament scores, relative to par
