= Lakeside Memorial Golf Course =

Golf course in Oklahoma, United States

Coordinates: 36°10′41″N 97°03′59″W

Lakeside Memorial Golf Course is a golf course located in Stillwater, Oklahoma.

== History ==
Lakeside was opened in 1945 by architect and Oklahoma State University golf coach Labron Harris. It served as the home course for the 10-time national champion Oklahoma State University Men's Golf Team for almost 50 years until the opening of Karsten Creek Golf Club in 1994. Lakeside is currently owned and operated by the City of Stillwater.

Labron Harris, OSU golf coach and South Central PGA president, served as Head Golf Professional until 1974. Lakeside has been the home course and training facility for many notable PGA Tour, LPGA Tour, and prominent amateur players. Some of the world's most important golf trophies have been on display in the golf shop: the U.S. Amateur, the British Amateur, the team NCAA Championship, the individual NCAA Championship, the Walker Cup, Western Amateur, PGA Championship, American Cup, and World Cups have occupied positions of prominence on the modest mantel alongside less imposing trophies from tournaments such as the Oklahoma Open and Oklahoma Amateur.

In 1998, architect Tripp Davis renovated Lakeside to its current layout. The golf course stretches over 6,756 yards, with SR 1020 bentgrass putting surfaces, Tifway 419 bermuda fairways, and tee boxes with a mixture of zoysia and Tifway 419 bermuda. The golf course wanders through mature blackjack oaks in the gentle rolling hills of north central Oklahoma. Lakeside is consistently ranked as one of the top public golf courses in the state of Oklahoma by Golf Digest magazine. Lakeside was the recipient of the 2011, 2012, and 2014 South Central PGA Youth Player Development Awards and the 2013 South Central PGA Merchandiser of the Year Award.

== Notable players that have used Lakeside as their home course and training facility ==
- Scott Verplank, U.S. Amateur champion & multiple PGA Tour winner
- Bob Tway, 1989 PGA Championship winner & multiple PGA Tour winner
- David Edwards, PGA Tour winner
- Danny Edwards, PGA Tour winner
- Doug Tewell, Senior PGA Championship winner & PGA Tour
- Lindy Miller, PGA Tour winner
- Mark Hayes, PGA Tour winner
- Michael Henderson, South Central PGA President
- Bill Glasson, PGA Tour winner
- Labron Harris Jr., U.S. Amateur champion
- Jim Hardy, PGA Tour, golf instructor
- Bob Dickson, U.S. Amateur & British Amateur champion
- Earl Moeller, NCAA champion
- Grier Jones, NCAA champion

== Notable Head PGA Golf Professionals ==
- Labron Harris, PGA (1945–1973) & South Central PGA President (1972)
- Michael Henderson, PGA (2010–Present) & South Central PGA President (current)
