= 1991 PGA Tour Qualifying School graduates =

This is a list of the 48 players who earned 1992 PGA Tour cards through the PGA Tour Qualifying Tournament in 1991. 182 players entered the tournament.

Place	Player	PGA Tour starts	Cuts made	Notes
1	(United States) Mike Standly	34	15	
2	(United States) Carl Cooper	50	14	
T3	(United States) Tom Byrum	199	112	1 PGA Tour win
T3	(United States) Kelly Gibson	5	2	1 Ben Hogan Tour win
T3	(United States) Sonny Skinner	29	13	
T6	(United States) Paul McIntire	0	0	
T6	(United States) Jon Chaffee	85	35	
T8	(United States) Patrick Burke	23	3	
T8	(United States) Fran Quinn	7	3	
T8	(United States) Donnie Hammond	234	167	2 PGA Tour wins
T8	(United States) Steve Hart	110	38	
12	(United States) Emlyn Aubrey	65	41	
T13	(United States) Mike Cunning	16	1	
T13	(United States) Greg Lesher	2	1	
T13	(United States) Greg Whisman	29	13	
T13	(United States) John Ross	4	1	
17	(United States) J. P. Hayes	0	0	
T18	(United States) E. J. Pfister	0	0	
T18	(United States) Mark Carnevale	10	2	
T18	(United States) Bob Friend	4	0	1 Ben Hogan Tour win
T18	(United States) Jim Woodward	64	22	
T18	(United States) Doug Martin	3	2	
T23	(United States) John Inman	171	86	1 PGA Tour win
T23	(United States) David Toms	8	1	
T23	(United States) Bruce Zabriski	37	11	1 Ben Hogan Tour win
T23	(United States) Mitch Adcock	38	17	
T23	(United States) Chris Tucker	3	1	
T23	(Canada) Richard Zokol	253	124	
T23	(United States) David Ogrin	261	137	
T30	(United States) Brandel Chamblee	71	24	1 Ben Hogan Tour win
T30	(United States) Michael Allen	60	31	1 European Tour win
T30	(United States) Dicky Thompson	31	13	2 Ben Hogan Tour wins
T30	(United States) Tray Tyner	4	3	
T30	(United States) John Riegger	25	6	
T30	(United States) Jim McGovern	36	14	3 Ben Hogan Tour wins
T36	(United States) Dave Peege	1	1	
T36	(United States) Marco Dawson	32	14	
T36	(United States) Kim Young	52	15	1 Ben Hogan Tour win
T36	(United States) John Elliott	0	0	
T36	(United States) Robin Freeman	34	10	
T36	(United States) Greg Hickman	29	7	
T42	(United States) Brad Bell	25	4	1 Ben Hogan Tour win
T42	(United States) Lon Hinkle	399	266	3 PGA Tour wins
T42	(United States) Mike Sullivan	370	253	2 PGA Tour wins
T42	(United States) Dave Schreyer	1	0	
T42	(United States) Dick Mast	212	109	3 Ben Hogan Tour wins
T42	(United States) Greg Kraft	0	0	
T42	(United States) Steve Lamontagne	32	16	

PGA Tour rookie in 1992

== 1992 Results ==
Player	Starts	Cuts made	Best finish	Money list rank	Earnings ($)
(United States) Mike Standly	29	22	T2	73	213,712
(United States) Carl Cooper	29	9	T15	190	38,401
(United States) Tom Byrum	29	10	T3	136	94,399
(United States) Kelly Gibson*	33	14	T4	105	137,984
(United States) Sonny Skinner	28	9	T23	201	26,454
(United States) Paul McIntire*	22	1	T33	259	6,075
(United States) Jon Chaffee	29	4	T23	214	18,245
(United States) Patrick Burke	28	19	T6	129	101,153
(United States) Fran Quinn*	25	6	T12	191	36,155
(United States) Donnie Hammond	21	13	T2	77	197,085
(United States) Steve Hart	31	13	T14	157	69,124
(United States) Emlyn Aubrey	28	9	T12	167	58,087
(United States) Michael Cunning	30	11	T10	165	58,733
(United States) Greg Lesher*	28	12	T6	145	84,818
(United States) Greg Whisman	29	11	13	149	83,322
(United States) John Ross*	29	16	T16	143	85,541
(United States) J. P. Hayes*	27	10	T6	155	72,830
(United States) E. J. Pfister*	24	6	T38	229	12,616
(United States) Mark Carnevale*	28	14	Win	70	220,922
(United States) Bob Friend*	31	19	T11	137	93,337
(United States) Jim Woodward	25	11	T5	95	161,301
(United States) Doug Martin*	32	12	7	150	77,204
(United States) John Inman	31	20	T6	87	173,828
(United States) David Toms*	30	14	3	101	148,712
(United States) Bruce Zabriski	29	12	T12	142	86,275
(United States) Mitch Adcock	28	11	T11	166	58,394
(United States) Chris Tucker*	34	9	T3	138	92,537
(Canada) Richard Zokol	23	12	Win	48	311,909
(United States) David Ogrin	28	11	T28	193	33,971
(United States) Brandel Chamblee	28	15	T14	133	97,921
(United States) Michael Allen	16	4	T43	233	11,455
(United States) Dicky Thompson	27	9	T11	178	47,770
(United States) Tray Tyner*	28	6	T17	182	44,153
(United States) John Riegger	28	10	T21	192	33,980
(United States) Jim McGovern	33	19	4	92	169,888
(United States) Dave Peege*	27	7	T23	206	22,747
(United States) Marco Dawson	28	14	T5	123	113,464
(United States) Kim Young	25	10	T12	169	55,048
(United States) John Elliott*	24	5	T46	246	9,857
(United States) Robin Freeman	31	10	T4	128	101,642
(United States) Greg Hickman	27	7	T11	187	38,941
(United States) Brad Bell	21	6	T14	209	21,414
(United States) Lon Hinkle	19	12	T7	139	91,854
(United States) Mike Sullivan	28	13	T8	121	115,441
(United States) Dave Schreyer*	23	3	T32	242	10,215
(United States) Dick Mast	27	10	2	98	150,847
(United States) Greg Kraft*	30	11	T6	140	88,824
(United States) Steve Lamontagne	29	18	T4	109	132,498

*PGA Tour rookie in 1992
T = Tied
The player retained his PGA Tour card for 1993 (finished inside the top 125, excluding non-members)
The player did not retain his PGA Tour card for 1993, but retained conditional status (finished between 126-150, excluding non-members)
The player did not retain his PGA Tour card for 1993 (finished outside the top 150)

== Winners on the PGA Tour in 1992 ==
No.	Date	Player	Tournament	Winning score	Margin of victory	Runner(s)-up
1	Jul 19	(United States) Mark Carnevale	Chattanooga Classic	−19 (68-71-66-64=269)	2 strokes	(United States) Ed Dougherty (United States) Dan Forsman
2	Sep 6	(Canada) Richard Zokol	Greater Milwaukee Open	−19 (67-71-64-67=269)	2 strokes	(United States) Dick Mast

== Runners-up on the PGA Tour in 1992 ==
No.	Date	Player	Tournament	Winner	Winning score	Runner-up score
1	Apr 5	(United States) Mike Standly	Freeport-McMoRan Golf Classic	(United States) Chip Beck	−12 (67-65-74-70=276)	−11 (69-73-66-69=277)
2	Aug 2	(United States) Donnie Hammond	Canon Greater Hartford Open	(United States) Lanny Wadkins	−6 (68-70-71-65=274)	−4 (66-70-68-72=276)
3	Sep 6	(United States) Dick Mast	Greater Milwaukee Open	(Canada) Richard Zokol	−19 (67-71-64-67=269)	−17 (67-69-71-64=271)

== See also ==
- 1991 Ben Hogan Tour graduates
