= Brad Bell =

Brad Bell may refer to:

- Brad Bell (golfer) (born 1961), American golfer
- Brad Bell (producer) (born 1985), American television producer and writer
