= Rocky Walcher =

American professional golfer

Personal information
- Nationality: United States
- Born: October 12, 1961 (age 65) Carnegie, Oklahoma, U.S.
- Height: 6 ft 0 in (1.83 m)
- Weight: 200 lb (91 kg; 14 st)
- Children: 2

Career
- Sport: Golf
- College: Southwestern Oklahoma State University
- Turned professional: 1985
- Professional wins: 3

Number of wins by tour
- Korn Ferry Tour: 1
- Other: 2

Best results in major championships
- Masters Tournament: DNP
- PGA Championship: DNP
- U.S. Open: 59th: 1998
- The Open Championship: DNP

Rocky Walcher (born October 12, 1961) is an American professional golfer.

== Early life and amateur career ==
Walcher was born in Carnegie, Oklahoma. He played college golf at Southwestern Oklahoma State University. He was inducted into the SWOSU Athletic Hall of Fame in 2006.

== Professional career ==
Walcher played on the Nationwide Tour and the PGA Tour between 1991 and 2003. On the Nationwide Tour (1991–93, 1996-2000, 2002–03), he won once at the 1996 Nike Omaha Classic. On the PGA Tour (1994, 2001) his best finish was T-8 at the 1995 Deposit Guaranty Golf Classic.

== Awards and honors ==
In 2006, Walcher was inducted into the Southwestern Oklahoma State University's Athletic Hall of Fame

== Professional wins (3) ==
=== Nike Tour wins (1) ===
No.	Date	Tournament	Winning score	Margin of victory	Runners-up
1	Aug 11, 1996	Nike Omaha Classic	−21 (66-65-71-65=267)	1 stroke	(United States) Michael Christie, (United States) Steve Larick

=== Other wins (2) ===
- 2004 Oklahoma Open
- 2007 Oklahoma Open

== Results in major championships ==
Tournament	1991	1992	1993	1994	1995	1996	1997	1998
U.S. Open	CUT							59

Did not play

CUT = missed the half-way cut
"T" = tied
Note: Walcher only played in the U.S. Open.

== See also ==
- 1993 PGA Tour Qualifying School graduates
- 2000 PGA Tour Qualifying School graduates
