= Labron Harris =

American golfer and golf coach

Personal information
- Nationality: United States
- Born: November 26, 1908
- Died: August 14, 1995 (aged 86) Stillwater, Oklahoma, U.S.
- Children: Labron Harris, Jr.

Career
- Sport: Golf
- Professional wins: 3

Achievements and awards
- Oklahoma Sports Hall of Fame: 1994

Labron E. Harris (November 26, 1908 – August 14, 1995) was an American professional golfer and golf coach.

== Career ==
In 1945, Harris designed the Lakeside Golf Course. Lakeside served as the home golf course and training facility for the Oklahoma State University golf teams for almost 50 years. Harris was the head golf professional from 1945 to his retirement in 1973.

Harris also coached at Oklahoma State University from 1947 to 1973. He coached the team to twenty-four Missouri Valley Conference and Big 8 Conference championships as well as the 1963 NCAA Division I Golf Championship. Harris coached 27 All-Americans and two NCAA champions: Earl Moeller in 1953 and Grier Jones in 1968.

== Personal life ==
His son, Labron Harris Jr., is a professional golfer who won on the PGA Tour.

== Awards and honors ==
In 1994, Harris was inducted into the Oklahoma Sports Hall of Fame.

== Professional wins ==
this list is incomplete

- 1950 Iowa Open
- 1953 Oklahoma Open
- 1958 Waterloo Open Golf Classic
