= South Texas Open =

Nike South Texas Open
Tournament information
- Location: Portland, Texas
- Established: 1990
- Course: NorthShore Country Club
- Par: 72
- Tour: Nike Tour
- Format: Stroke play
- Prize fund: US$150,000
- Month played: April
- Final year: 1993

Tournament record score
- Aggregate: 287 Doug Martin (1993)
- To par: −1 as above

Final champion
- (United States) Doug Martin
- Location in the United States Location in Texas

The South Texas Open was a golf tournament on the Nike Tour. It ran from 1990 to 1993. It was played at NorthShore Country Club in Portland, Texas.

== Winners ==
Year	Winner	Score	To par	Margin of victory	Runner(s)-up
Nike South Texas Open
1993	(United States) Doug Martin	287	−1	Playoff	(United States) Guy Boros
Ben Hogan South Texas Open
1992	(United States) Brian Henninger	208	−8	Playoff	(United States) Bob Burns
1991	(United States) Roger Salazar	219	+3	3 strokes	(United States) Doug Martin (United States) Sean Murphy
1990	(United States) Brad Bell	210	−6	1 stroke	(United States) John Kernohan
