= Dave Schreyer =

American golfer (born 1966)

Personal information
- Nationality: United States
- Born: September 15, 1966 (age 60) Atlanta, Georgia, U.S.
- Height: 5 ft 11 in (1.80 m)
- Weight: 170 lb (77 kg; 12 st)

Career
- Sport: Golf
- College: Huntingdon College
- Turned professional: 1989
- Former tours: PGA Tour; Nationwide Tour; Sunshine Tour; NGA Hooters Tour
- Professional wins: 10

Best results in major championships
- Masters Tournament: DNP
- PGA Championship: DNP
- U.S. Open: T65: 1997
- The Open Championship: DNP

Dave Schreyer (born September 15, 1966) is an American professional golfer.

== Career ==
Schreyer was born in Atlanta, Georgia. He attended Huntingdon College.

In 1992, Schreyer has played on the PGA Tour. He entered his first PGA Tour event in 1988 at the Pensacola Open. Overall on the PGA Tour, he has competed in 26 events and made 4 cuts with earnings over $16,000. His best PGA Tour finish was a tie for 32nd place at the Federal Express St. Jude Classic on June 14, 1992, shooting a combined 274 (10 under par).

Schreyer's best finish on the PGA Tour's developmental tour was a tie for 3rd place at the NIKE Fort Smith Classic on August 22, 1999 while shooting a combined 267.

In 1997, Schreyer competed in the U.S. Open where he finished tied for 65th place.

Schreyer has a total of 10 professional wins on the Hooters Tour and is currently second place all-time in Hooters Tour wins. He also won the Georgia Open in 1996 and 2001.

== Professional wins (10) ==
=== NGA Hooters Tour wins (10) ===
No.	Date	Tournament	Winning score	Margin of victory	Runner(s)-up
1	Apr 2, 1995	Jackaroo Barby Q Australian Style Open	−6 (70-70-75-67=282)	1 stroke	(United States) Ricky Smallridge
2	Aug 25, 1996	Jackaroo Steakhouse Classic	−20 (65-66-70-67=268)	2 strokes	(United States) Garrett Willis
3	Sep 20, 1996	Hooters Classic	−8 (66-72-67-67=272)	2 strokes	(United States) Steve Ford, (United States) Dicky Thompson
4	Jun 8, 1997	Michelob-Heller Ford Classic	−15 (67-70-67-65=269)	3 strokes	(United States) Chad Campbell
5	Jul 29, 2001	NGA New Orleans Classic	−28 (61-67-67-65=260)	7 strokes	(United States) Todd Bailey, (United States) Justin Bolli
6	Jun 15, 2003	Kroger/Powerbar Classic	−16 (63-67-70-72=272)	Playoff	(United States) Jake Reeves
7	Aug 24, 2003	Arkansas Classic	−22 (69-65-64-68=266)	2 strokes	(United States) Justin Bolli
8	Sep 28, 2003	Tour Championship	−17 (64-71-67-69=271)	2 strokes	(United States) Jake Reeves
9	Jul 11, 2004	Michelob Ultra Championship	−15 (70-67-69-67=273)	2 strokes	(United States) Scott Piercy
10	Oct 2, 2005	Naturally Fresh Foods Points Tour Championship	−13 (66-67-71-71=275)	2 strokes	(United States) Nick Gilliam

== See also ==
- 1991 PGA Tour Qualifying School graduates
