= Steve Elkington =

Australian professional golfer

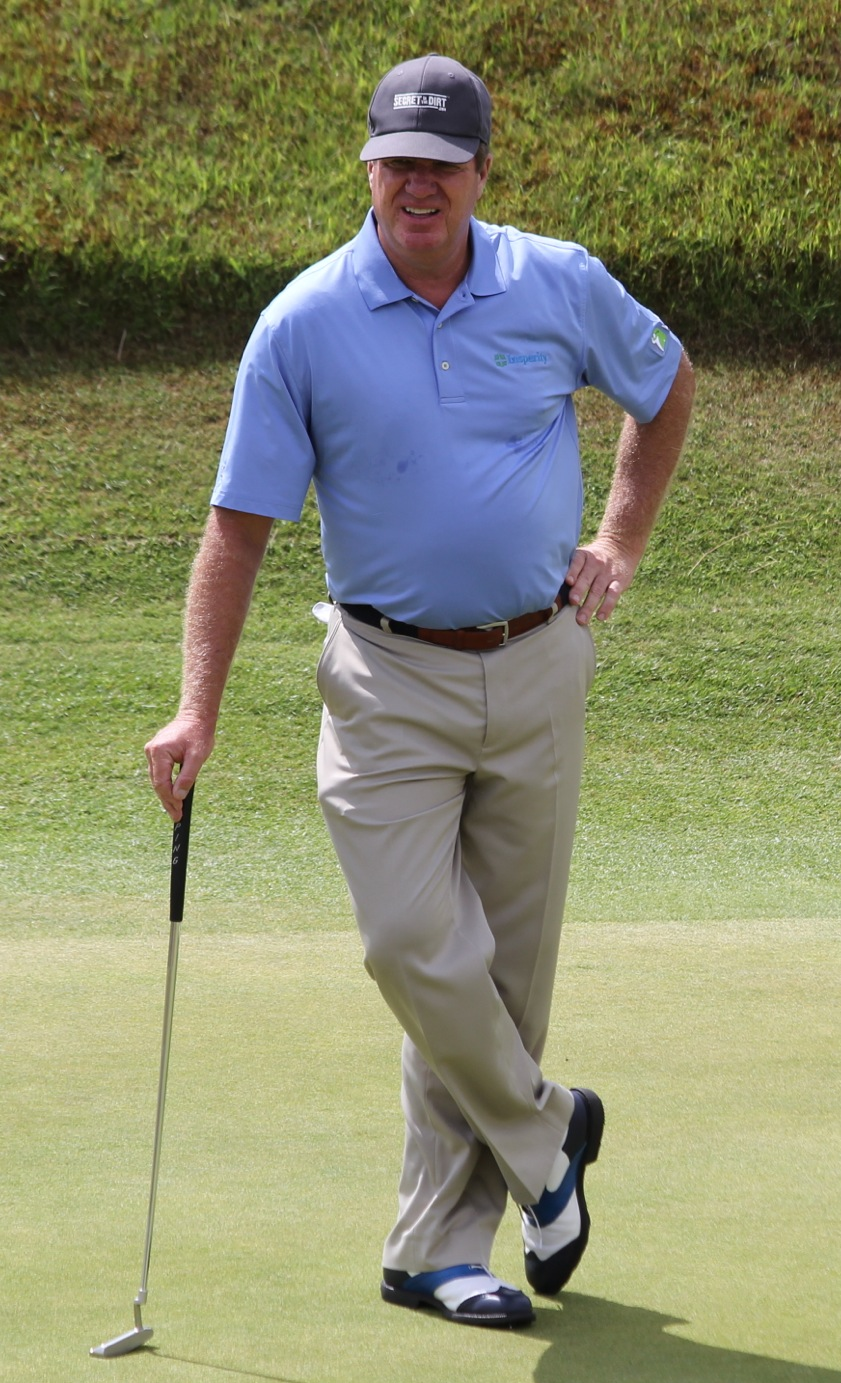
- Elkington in 2013

Personal information
- Full name: Stephen John Elkington
- Nationality: Australia
- Born: 8 December 1962 (age 63) Inverell, New South Wales, Australia
- Height: 6 ft 2 in (1.88 m)
- Weight: 190 lb (86 kg; 14 st)
- Spouse: Lisa Elkington
- Children: 2

Career
- Sport: Golf
- College: University of Houston
- Turned professional: 1985
- Former tours: PGA Tour; PGA Tour Champions
- Professional wins: 17
- Highest ranking: 3 (20 April 1997)

Number of wins by tour
- PGA Tour: 10
- Asian Tour: 1
- PGA Tour of Australasia: 1
- Other: 5

Best results in major championships (wins: 1)
- Masters Tournament: T3: 1993
- PGA Championship: Won: 1995
- U.S. Open: T21: 1989, 1990
- The Open Championship: T2: 2002

Achievements and awards
- Vardon Trophy: 1995

Stephen John Elkington (born 8 December 1962) is an Australian professional golfer on the PGA Tour Champions. Formerly on the PGA Tour, he spent more than fifty weeks in the top-10 of the Official World Golf Ranking from 1995 to 1998. Elkington won a major title at the PGA Championship in 1995, and is a two-time winner of The Players Championship.

== Early life and amateur career ==
In 1962, Elkington was born in Inverell, New South Wales. He grew up in Wagga Wagga, New South Wales.

Elkington moved to the United States to attend college in Texas at the University of Houston, where he played on the Cougar golf team that won national titles in 1982, 1984, and 1985. Elkington was the first prominent Australian to play college golf in the U.S.

== Professional career ==
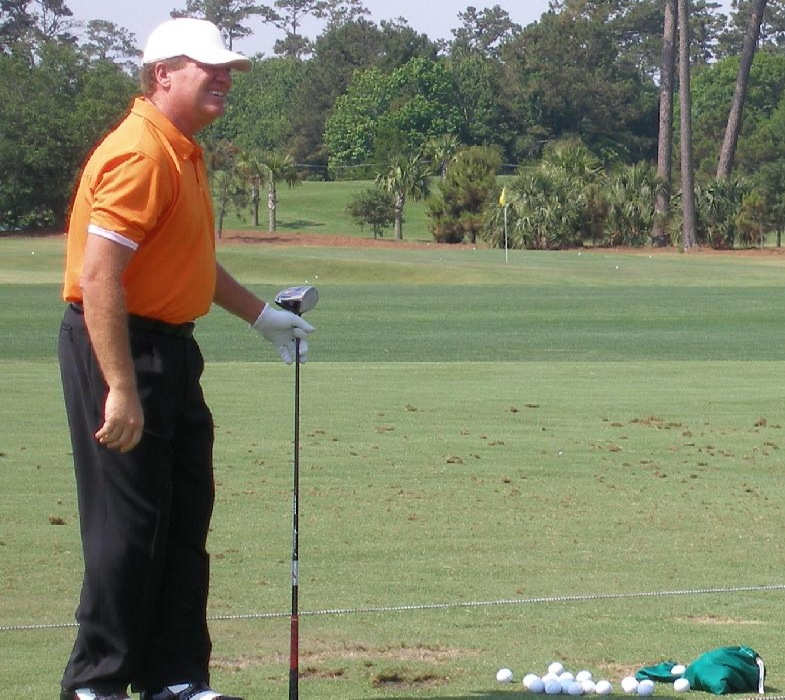
Elkington in 2008

In 1985, Elkington turned professional. Elkington was the runner-up at 1986 PGA Tour Qualifying School to earn his tour card. He had ten victories on the PGA Tour, all in the 1990s, and won four events twice. Elkington had ten top-10 finishes in major championships, with the best results at the PGA Championship; he won in 1995 at Riviera, and a tied for second in 2005 at Baltusrol, behind winner Phil Mickelson, which moved him back into the top 50 in the Official World Golf Ranking. He is a two-time winner of The Players Championship, the PGA Tour's marquee event, with victories in 1991 and 1997. Of the five to win twice at TPC Sawgrass, his span of six years between wins is the shortest.

In addition to his PGA Tour success, Elkington won the 1992 Australian Open and 1996 Honda Invitational on the Asian Tour.

Elkington was a participant in the first four editions of the Presidents Cup, on the International Team in 1994, 1996, 1998, and 2000. In 1995, he was awarded the Vardon Trophy; this award is given annually by the PGA of America to the tour player with the lowest scoring average.

In June 2006, playing in a sectional to qualify for the U.S. Open, Elkington tried to wear shoes with metal spikes. When his attempt was rebuffed, he left rather than change to soft-spiked shoes, and argued that since spiked shoes were allowed in the U.S. Open, the following week, that they should be allowed at sectional events.

Elkington's career has been hampered by constant battles with allergies, notably to grass, which caused several absences from tournament play. He has had sinus surgeries, constant infections, and bouts with viral meningitis, as well as searing headaches.

As of 2013, Elkington had sponsorship/endorsement deals with apparel brand Oxford Golf, Insperity, World Golf Tour, Grieve Family Winery, and Par West Custom Golf Shoes.

He made his debut on the Champions Tour in June 2013.

In 2014, RFD-TV began airing The Rural Golfer, starring Elkington. The production followed Elkington as he toured the United States, digging up golf stories. In 2015, CBS Sports Network began airing the second season of the show, retitled Secret Golf with Steve Elkington.

== Personal life ==
Elkington met his wife, Lisa, while at the University of Houston, and they have two children. The family has residences in both Australia and the U.S., at Sydney and Houston. His son Sam played golf on his high school team in Houston, and played on the golf team at the University of Houston from 2015 to 2020. His daughter works as a ceramics teacher.

== Professional wins (17) ==
=== PGA Tour wins (10) ===
Legend
Major championships (1)
Players Championships (2)
Other PGA Tour (7)

No.	Date	Tournament	Winning score	To par	Margin of victory	Runner(s)-up
1	22 Apr 1990	KMart Greater Greensboro Open	74-71-71-66=282	−6	2 strokes	(United States) Mike Reid, (United States) Jeff Sluman
2	31 Mar 1991	The Players Championship	66-70-72-68=276	−12	1 stroke	(United States) Fuzzy Zoeller
3	12 Jan 1992	Infiniti Tournament of Champions	69-71-67-72=279	−9	Playoff	(United States) Brad Faxon
4	2 Oct 1994	Buick Southern Open	66-66-68=200 (Note: Shortened to 54 holes due to weather.)	−16	5 strokes	(Australia) Steve Rintoul
5	8 Jan 1995	Mercedes Championships (2)	69-71-71-67=278	−10	Playoff	(United States) Bruce Lietzke
6	13 Aug 1995	PGA Championship	68-67-68-64=267	−17	Playoff	(Scotland) Colin Montgomerie
7	9 Mar 1997	Doral-Ryder Open	70-66-70-69=275	−13	2 strokes	(United States) Larry Nelson, (Zimbabwe) Nick Price
8	30 Mar 1997	The Players Championship (2)	66-69-68-69=272	−16	7 strokes	(United States) Scott Hoch
9	4 Oct 1998	Buick Challenge (2)	66-70-66-65=267	−21	Playoff	(United States) Fred Funk
10	7 Mar 1999	Doral-Ryder Open (2)	72-70-69-64=275	−13	1 stroke	(United States) Greg Kraft

PGA Tour playoff record (4–4)

No.	Year	Tournament	Opponent(s)	Result
1	1992	Infiniti Tournament of Champions	(United States) Brad Faxon	Won with birdie on first extra hole
2	1992	Buick Open	(United States) Brad Faxon, (United States) Dan Forsman	Forsman won with par on second extra hole Faxon eliminated by par on first hole
3	1992	H.E.B. Texas Open	(Zimbabwe) Nick Price	Lost to par on second extra hole
4	1993	KMart Greater Greensboro Open	(United States) Rocco Mediate	Lost to birdie on fourth extra hole
5	1995	Mercedes Championships	(United States) Bruce Lietzke	Won with birdie on second extra hole
6	1995	PGA Championship	(Scotland) Colin Montgomerie	Won with birdie on first extra hole
7	1998	Buick Challenge	(United States) Fred Funk	Won with par on first extra hole
8	2002	The Open Championship	(Australia) Stuart Appleby, (South Africa) Ernie Els, (France) Thomas Levet	Els won with par on first extra hole after four-hole aggregate playoff; Els: E (4-3-5-4=16), Levet: E (4-2-5-5=16), Appleby: +1 (4-3-5-5=17), Elkington: +1 (5-3-4-5=17)

=== Asian PGA Tour wins (1) ===
No.	Date	Tournament	Winning score	To par	Margin of victory	Runner-up
1	5 May 1996	Honda Invitational	71-73-68-69=281	−7	1 stroke	(Philippines) Felix Casas

=== PGA Tour of Australasia wins (1) ===
Legend
Flagship events (1)
Other PGA Tour of Australasia (0)

No.	Date	Tournament	Winning score	To par	Margin of victory	Runners-up
1	29 Nov 1992	Australian Open	69-68-69-74=280	−8	2 strokes	(Australia) Peter McWhinney, (United States) Duffy Waldorf

=== Other wins (5) ===
No.	Date	Tournament	Winning score	To par	Margin of victory	Runners-up
1	24 Aug 1993	Fred Meyer Challenge (with (United States) Tom Purtzer)	63-63=128	−16	1 stroke	(United States) Fred Couples and (United States) Davis Love III, (United States) Brad Faxon and (United States) Rick Fehr, (United States) Jim Gallagher Jr. and (United States) Bruce Lietzke
2	21 Nov 1993	Franklin Funds Shark Shootout (with (United States) Raymond Floyd)	62-64-62=188	−28	1 stroke	(United States) Mark Calcavecchia and (United States) Brad Faxon, (United States) Hale Irwin and (United States) Bruce Lietzke, (United States) Tom Kite and (United States) Davis Love III, (United States) Mark O'Meara and (United States) Curtis Strange
3	19 Nov 1995	Franklin Templeton Shootout (2) (with (United States) Mark Calcavecchia)	64-61-59=184	−32	1 stroke	(United States) Chip Beck and (United States) Lee Janzen
4	14 Dec 1997	Diners Club Matches (with (United States) Jeff Maggert)	2 and 1			(United States) Tom Lehman and (United States) Duffy Waldorf
5	15 Nov 1998	Franklin Templeton Shark Shootout (3) (with (Australia) Greg Norman)	67-64-58=189	−27	Playoff	(United States) John Cook and (United States) Peter Jacobsen

Other playoff record (1–0)

No.	Year	Tournament	Opponents	Result
1	1998	Franklin Templeton Shark Shootout (with (Australia) Greg Norman)	(United States) John Cook and (United States) Peter Jacobsen	Won with birdie on third extra hole

== Major championships ==
=== Wins (1) ===
Year	Championship	54 holes	Winning score	Margin	Runner-up
1995	PGA Championship	6 shot deficit	−17 (68-67-68-64=267)	Playoff^{1}	(Scotland) Colin Montgomerie

^{1}Defeated Montgomerie with birdie on first extra hole.

=== Results timeline ===
Tournament	1988	1989	1990	1991	1992	1993	1994	1995	1996	1997	1998	1999
Masters Tournament				T22	T37	T3	CUT	T5	CUT	T12	30	T11
U.S. Open		T21	T21	T55	CUT	T33		T36	T40	T24	CUT	T51
The Open Championship			CUT	T44	T34	T48	T67	T6	CUT	CUT	WD	CUT
PGA Championship	T31	T41	CUT	T32	T18	T14	T7	1	T3	T45	3	

Tournament	2000	2001	2002	2003	2004	2005	2006	2007	2008	2009	2010	2011
Masters Tournament	T52			CUT								
U.S. Open						T33		CUT				
The Open Championship	T60	CUT	T2	WD			CUT					
PGA Championship		WD	T48			T2		CUT	T39	CUT	T5	CUT

Win
Top 10
Did not play

CUT = missed the half way cut
WD = Withdrew
"T" indicates a tie for a place.

=== Summary ===
Tournament	Wins	2nd	3rd	Top-5	Top-10	Top-25	Events	Cuts made
Masters Tournament	0	0	1	2	2	5	11	8
U.S. Open	0	0	0	0	0	3	12	9
The Open Championship	0	1	0	1	2	2	15	7
PGA Championship	1	1	2	5	6	8	19	13
Totals	1	2	3	8	10	18	57	37

- Most consecutive cuts made – 6 (twice)
- Longest streak of top-10s – 2 (twice)

== The Players Championship ==
=== Wins (2) ===
Year	Championship	54 holes	Winning score	Margin	Runner-up
1991	The Players Championship	4 shot deficit	−12 (66-70-72-68=276)	1 stroke	(United States) Fuzzy Zoeller
1997	The Players Championship (2)	2 shot lead	−16 (66-69-68-69=272)	7 strokes	(United States) Scott Hoch

=== Results timeline ===
Tournament	1987	1988	1989	1990	1991	1992	1993	1994	1995	1996	1997	1998	1999
The Players Championship	CUT	T54	CUT	T16	1	CUT	T16	T51	WD	T19	1		T38

Tournament	2000	2001	2002	2003	2004	2005	2006	2007	2008	2009
The Players Championship			T63	CUT	T26	T6		T12	T32	CUT

Win
Top 10
Did not play

CUT = missed the halfway cut
WD = withdrew
"T" indicates a tie for a place.

== Results in World Golf Championships ==
Tournament	1999	2000	2001	2002	2003	2004	2005	2006
Match Play	R64	R64						R64
Championship	T34		NT^{1}				WD	
Invitational	39		T23				T49	

^{1}Cancelled due to 9/11

Did not play

QF, R16, R32, R64 = Round in which player lost in match play
"T" = Tied
WD = Withdrew
NT = No tournament

== Results in senior major championships ==
Tournament	2013	2014
The Tradition	T19	T9
Senior PGA Championship		WD
Senior Players Championship	T24	
U.S. Senior Open	T6	T49
Senior British Open Championship	T11	

Top 10
Did not play

CUT = missed the halfway cut
"T" indicates a tie for a place
WD = withdrew

== Team appearances ==
- Presidents Cup (International team): 1994, 1996, 1998 (winners), 2000
- World Cup (representing Australia): 1994
- Alfred Dunhill Cup (representing Australia): 1994, 1995, 1996, 1997, 1998

== See also ==
- 1986 PGA Tour Qualifying School graduates
- List of men's major championships winning golfers
