= Brad Bell (golfer) =

American professional golfer (born 1961)

Personal information
- Nationality: United States
- Born: September 1, 1961 (age 65) Sacramento, California, U.S.
- Height: 6 ft 2 in (1.88 m)
- Weight: 200 lb (91 kg; 14 st)

Career
- Sport: Golf
- College: UC Davis; UCLA
- Turned professional: 1985
- Former tours: European Tour; PGA Tour; Nationwide Tour
- Professional wins: 2

Number of wins by tour
- Korn Ferry Tour: 1
- Other: 1

Best results in major championships
- Masters Tournament: DNP
- PGA Championship: DNP
- U.S. Open: CUT: 1988, 1995
- The Open Championship: DNP

Brad Bell (born September 1, 1961) is an American professional golfer.

== Early life and amateur career ==
Bell was born in Sacramento, California. He played college golf at UC Davis and UCLA where he was a two-time All-American.

== Professional career ==
In 1986 and 1987, Bell played on the European Tour where his best finish was T-37 at the 1986 Scandinavian Enterprise Open.

He played on the Ben Hogan Tour in 1990, winning the Ben Hogan South Texas Open. He played on the PGA Tour in 1991 and 1992, where his best finish was T-14 at the 1992 Buick Southern Open.

Bell is now a golf course architect with his own design company, Brad Bell Golf Course Design.

== Professional wins (2) ==
=== Ben Hogan Tour wins (1) ===
No.	Date	Tournament	Winning score	Margin of victory	Runner-up
1	Mar 4, 1990	Ben Hogan South Texas Open	−6 (74-66-70=210)	1 stroke	(United States) John Kernohan

=== Other wins (1) ===
- 1989 California State Open

== See also ==
- 1990 PGA Tour Qualifying School graduates
- 1991 PGA Tour Qualifying School graduates
