= Doug Martin (golfer) =

American professional golfer (born 1966)

Personal information
- Nationality: United States
- Born: December 8, 1966 (age 59) Bluffton, Ohio, U.S.
- Height: 6 ft 0 in (1.83 m)
- Weight: 190 lb (86 kg; 14 st)

Career
- Sport: Golf
- College: University of Oklahoma
- Turned professional: 1989
- Former tours: PGA Tour; Nationwide Tour
- Professional wins: 2

Number of wins by tour
- Korn Ferry Tour: 1
- Other: 1

Best results in major championships
- Masters Tournament: DNP
- PGA Championship: T23: 1997
- U.S. Open: T60: 1994
- The Open Championship: DNP

Doug Martin (born December 8, 1966) is an American professional golfer.

== Early life and amateur career ==
In 1966, Martin was born in Bluffton, Ohio. As an amateur, he won the 1984 U.S. Junior Amateur, was semi-finalist at 1988 U.S. Amateur, and played on the 1989 Walker Cup team. He played college golf at University of Oklahoma where he won three events and was a three-time All-American. He graduated in 1989.

== Professional career ==
In 1989, Martin turned professional. He played on the PGA Tour and its developmental tour from 1991 to 1999. On the developmental tour (1991, 1993) he won the 1993 Nike South Texas Open. On the PGA Tour (1992, 1994–99), his best finish was a playoff loss to Vijay Singh at the 1995 Buick Classic.

Martin has been the head coach of the Cincinnati Bearcats men's golf team since the fall of 2007.

== Amateur wins ==
- 1984 U.S. Junior Amateur

== Professional wins (2) ==
=== Nike Tour wins (1) ===
No.	Date	Tournament	Winning score	Margin of victory	Runner-up
1	Apr 4, 1993	Nike South Texas Open	−1 (70-76-70-71=287)	Playoff	(United States) Guy Boros

Nike Tour playoff record (1–1)

No.	Year	Tournament	Opponent	Result
1	1993	Nike South Texas Open	(United States) Guy Boros	Won with par on first extra hole
2	1993	Nike Permian Basin Open	(United States) Franklin Langham	Lost to birdie on second extra hole

=== Other wins (1) ===
- 1989 Oklahoma Open

== Playoff record ==
PGA Tour playoff record (0–1)

No.	Year	Tournament	Opponent	Result
1	1995	Buick Classic	(Fiji) Vijay Singh	Lost to birdie on fifth extra hole

== Results in major championships ==
Tournament	1994	1995	1996	1997	1998
U.S. Open	T60	CUT			CUT
PGA Championship		CUT	CUT	T23	

Did not play

CUT = missed the half-way cut
"T" = Tied
Note: Martin never played in the Masters Tournament or The Open Championship.

== U.S. national team appearances ==
Amateur

- Walker Cup: 1989

== See also ==
- 1991 PGA Tour Qualifying School graduates
- 1993 Nike Tour graduates
- 1994 PGA Tour Qualifying School graduates
