= Oklahoma Open =

Golf tournament

The Oklahoma Open is the Oklahoma state open golf tournament, open to both amateur and professional golfers. It is organized by the Oklahoma Golf Association. It has been played every year since 1910 at a variety of courses around the state. It was considered a PGA Tour event briefly in the 1920s.

== Winners ==
- 2026 Owen Stamper
- 2025 John Sand
- 2024 Owen Stamper
- 2023 Blaine Hale
- 2022 Chandler Phillips
- 2021 Zach James
- 2020 Andrew Hudson
- 2019 Max McGreevy
- 2018 Casey Fernandez
- 2017 Max McGreevy
- 2016 Michael Balcar
- 2015 Josh Creel
- 2014 Robby Ormand
- 2013 Chris Worrell (amateur)
- 2012 Matt VanCleave
- 2011 Robert Streb
- 2010 Rhein Gibson
- 2009 Robert Streb
- 2008 Brett Myers
- 2007 Rocky Walcher
- 2006 Kyle Flinton
- 2005 Kyle Willmann
- 2004 Rocky Walcher
- 2003 Cody Freeman
- 2002 Chris Noel
- 2001 Lucas Glover
- 2000 John Bizik
- 1999 Todd Hamilton
- 1998 Kevin Dillen
- 1997 Gil Morgan
- 1996 David Edwards
- 1995 Willie Wood
- 1994 David Edwards
- 1993 Mark Hayes
- 1992 Bryan Norton
- 1991 Jim Kane
- 1990 Willie Wood
- 1989 Doug Martin
- 1988 Mark Hayes
- 1987 Bob Tway
- 1986 Lindy Miller
- 1985 Bob Tway
- 1984 Kenny Huff
- 1983 Tom Jones
- 1982 Doug Tewell
- 1981 Gil Morgan
- 1980 Jaime Gonzalez
- 1979 Danny Edwards
- 1978 Lindy Miller
- 1977 Danny Edwards
- 1976 Mark Hayes
- 1975 Danny Edwards
- 1974 Bobby Stroble
- 1973 Spike Kelley
- 1972 Don Maddox
- 1971 Bob Dickson
- 1970 Chris Gers
- 1969 Chris Gers
- 1968 Grier Jones
- 1967 Jamie Gough III
- 1966 Bob Dickson
- 1965 Buster Cupit
- 1964 Jerry Pittman
- 1963 Labron Harris Jr.
- 1962 Babe Hiskey
- 1961 Jimmy Gauntt
- 1960 Jimmy Gauntt
- 1959 Joe Walser, Jr.
- 1958 Buster Cupit
- 1957 Johnny Palmer
- 1956 Jimmy Gauntt
- 1955 Jimmy Gauntt
- 1954 Jimmy Gauntt
- 1953 Labron Harris
- 1951–1952 No tournament
- 1950 Charles Klein
- 1949 Tex Consolver
- 1948 Jimmy Gauntt
- 1947 George Getchell
- 1946 Ray Gafford
- 1943–1945 No tournament
- 1942 George Whitehead
- 1941 Buddy Poteet
- 1940 Billy Simpson
- 1939 Zell Eaton
- 1938 Billy Simpson
- 1937 Jack Malloy
- 1936 Clarence Yockey
- 1935 Walter Emery
- 1934 Harold "Jug" McSpaden
- 1933 Jimmy Gullane
- 1932 Jimmy Gullane
- 1931 Harold "Jug" McSpaden
- 1930 Clarence Clark
- 1929 Dick Grout
- 1928 Harold Long
- 1927 Dick Grout
- 1926 Ed Dudley
- 1925 Ed Dudley
- 1924 Bill Creavy
- 1923 Bill Mehlhorn
- 1922 Phil Hessler
- 1921 Sandy Baxter
- 1920 William Nichols
- 1919 John Gatherum
- 1918 Jock Taylor
- 1917 Jock Collins
- 1916 William Nichols
- 1915 Chester Williams
- 1914 William Nichols
- 1913 Chester Nelson
- 1912 Chester Nelson
- 1911 William Nichols
- 1910 William Nichols
