= 1997 U.S. Open (golf) =

Coordinates: 38.996°N 77.176°W

Tournament information
- Dates: June 12–15, 1997
- Location: Bethesda, Maryland
- Course(s): Congressional Country Club; Blue Course
- Organized by: USGA
- Tour: PGA Tour

Statistics
- Par: 70
- Length: 7,213 yards (6,596 m)
- Field: 156 players, 84 after cut
- Cut: 147 (+7)
- Prize fund: $2,600,000
- Winner's share: $465,000

Champion
- (South Africa) Ernie Els
- 276 (−4)

Location in the United States

The 1997 United States Open Championship was the 97th U.S. Open, held June 12–15 at the Blue Course of Congressional Country Club in Bethesda, Maryland, a suburb northwest of Washington, D.C. Ernie Els won his second U.S. Open, the second of his four major championships, one stroke ahead of runner-up Colin Montgomerie.

== Course layout ==
Hole	1	2	3	4	5	6	7	8	9	Out	10	11	12	13	14	15	16	17	18	In	Total
Yards	402	235	455	434	407	475	174	362	607	3,551	466	415	187	461	439	583	441	480	190	3,662	7,213
Par	4	3	4	4	4	4	3	4	5	35	4	4	3	4	4	5	4	4	3	35	70

== Round summaries ==
=== First round ===
Thursday, June 12, 1997

Place	Player	Score	To par
1	(Scotland) Colin Montgomerie	65	−5
T2	(United States) Steve Stricker	66	−4
T2	(United States) Hal Sutton	66	−4
T4	(United States) Tom Lehman	67	−3
T4	(Zimbabwe) Mark McNulty	67	−3
T6	(Japan) Hideki Kase	68	−2
T6	(United States) Dave Schreyer	68	−2
T8	(United States) Justin Leonard	69	−1
T8	(United States) Jeff Sluman	69	−1
T10	(United States) Mike Brisky	70	E
T10	(United States) Hale Irwin	70	E
T10	(United States) Joel Kribel (a)	70	E
T10	(United States) Larry Mize	70	E
T10	(United States) David Ogrin	70	E
T10	(Australia) Craig Parry	70	E
T10	(United States) Chris Perry	70	E
T10	(United States) David White	70	E

=== Second round ===
Friday, June 13, 1997
Saturday, June 14, 1997

Place	Player	Score	To par
1	(United States) Tom Lehman	67-70=137	−3
T2	(United States) Stewart Cink	71-67=138	−2
T2	(South Africa) Ernie Els	71-67=138	−2
T4	(United States) Scott Hoch	71-68=139	−1
T4	(United States) Jeff Maggert	73-66=139	−1
T4	(United States) David Ogrin	70-69=139	−1
T4	(United States) Hal Sutton	66-73=139	−1
8	(Zimbabwe) Mark McNulty	67-73=140	E
T9	(United States) Scott Dunlap	75-66=141	+1
T9	(United States) Kelly Gibson	72-69=141	+1
T9	(Japan) Hideki Kase	68-73=141	+1
T9	(United States) Justin Leonard	69-72=141	+1
T9	(Scotland) Colin Montgomerie	65-76=141	+1
T9	(United States) Loren Roberts	72-69=141	+1
T9	(United States) Dave Schreyer	68-73=141	+1
T9	(United States) Jeff Sluman	69-72=141	+1
T9	(United States) Tommy Tolles	74-67=141	+1
T9	(United States) Tiger Woods	74-67=141	+1

Amateurs: Kribel (+8), Wollmann (+9), Noe (+11), Semelsberger (+14), Kearney (+17).

=== Third round ===
Saturday, June 14, 1997
Sunday, June 15, 1997

Place	Player	Score	To par
1	(United States) Tom Lehman	67-70-68=205	−5
T2	(South Africa) Ernie Els	71-67-69=207	−3
T2	(United States) Jeff Maggert	73-66-68=207	−3
4	(Scotland) Colin Montgomerie	65-76-67=208	−2
T5	(United States) Jay Haas	73-69-68=210	E
T5	(United States) David Ogrin	70-69-71=210	E
T5	(United States) Tommy Tolles	74-67-69=210	E
T8	(United States) Billy Andrade	75-67-69=211	+1
T8	(United States) Olin Browne	71-71-69=211	+1
T8	(United States) Jim Furyk	74-68-69=211	+1
T8	(United States) Scott Hoch	71-68-72=211	+1

=== Final round ===
Sunday, June 15, 1997

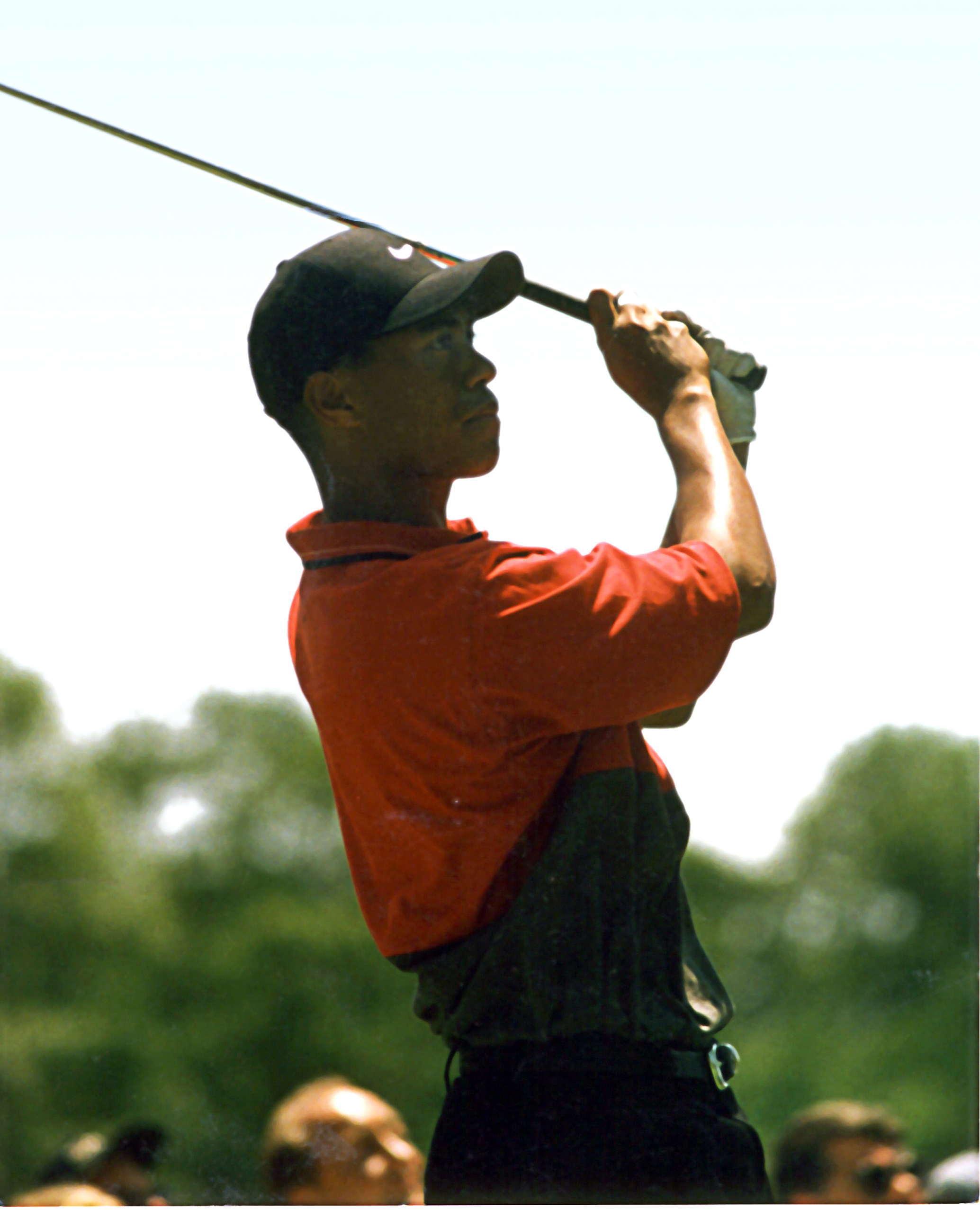
Tiger Woods at the 1997 U.S. Open.

Place	Player	Score	To par	Money ($)
1	(South Africa) Ernie Els	71-67-69-69=276	−4	465,000
2	(Scotland) Colin Montgomerie	65-76-67-69=277	−3	275,000
3	(United States) Tom Lehman	67-70-68-73=278	−2	172,828
4	(United States) Jeff Maggert	73-66-68-74=281	+1	120,454
T5	(United States) Olin Browne	71-71-69-71=282	+2	79,875
T5	(United States) Jim Furyk	74-68-69-71=282	+2	79,875
T5	(United States) Jay Haas	73-69-68-72=282	+2	79,875
T5	(United States) Tommy Tolles	74-67-69-72=282	+2	79,875
T5	(United States) Bob Tway	71-71-70-70=282	+2	79,875
T10	(United States) Scott Hoch	71-68-72-72=283	+3	56,949
T10	(United States) Scott McCarron	73-71-69-70=283	+3	56,949
T10	(United States) David Ogrin	70-69-71-73=283	+3	56,949

Amateurs: none made the cut

==== Scorecard ====
Final round

Hole	1	2	3	4	5	6	7	8	9	10	11	12	13	14	15	16	17	18
Par	4	3	4	4	4	4	3	4	5	4	4	3	4	4	5	4	4	3
(South Africa) Els	−3	−3	−3	−3	−3	−2	−3	−4	−3	−4	−4	−5	−4	−4	−4	−4	−4	−4
(Scotland) Montgomerie	−3	−3	−3	−3	−3	−2	−3	−3	−4	−4	−4	−4	−4	−4	−4	−4	−3	−3
(United States) Lehman	−5	−5	−4	−3	−4	−3	−3	−4	−4	−4	−4	−4	−4	−3	−4	−3	−2	−2
(United States) Maggert	−3	−3	−3	−4	−4	−3	−3	−4	−4	−4	−4	−4	−3	−3	−3	−2	E	+1
(United States) Browne	+1	+1	+2	+3	+3	+3	+3	+2	+1	+1	+1	+1	+1	E	E	+1	+2	+2
(United States) Furyk	+1	+1	+1	+1	+2	+3	+3	+2	+2	+2	+1	+1	+1	+1	+2	+2	+2	+2
(United States) Haas	−1	−1	−2	−2	E	E	E	E	−1	−1	−1	−1	−1	E	E	E	+2	+2
(United States) Tolles	−1	−1	E	E	E	−1	−1	−1	−1	E	E	E	E	+1	E	+1	+2	+2
(United States) Tway	+2	+2	+1	+1	+1	+2	+2	+1	+1	+1	+1	+1	+2	+2	+2	+2	+2	+2

Cumulative tournament scores, relative to par

Birdie	Bogey	Double bogey
