= Mark Lye =

American professional golfer (born 1952)

Personal information
- Full name: Mark Ryan Lye
- Nationality: United States
- Born: November 13, 1952 (age 73) Vallejo, California, U.S.
- Height: 6 ft 2 in (1.88 m)
- Weight: 195 lb (88 kg; 13.9 st)

Career
- Sport: Golf
- College: San Jose State University
- Turned professional: 1975
- Former tours: PGA Tour; Champions Tour; PGA Tour of Australia
- Professional wins: 2

Number of wins by tour
- PGA Tour: 1
- PGA Tour of Australasia: 1

Best results in major championships
- Masters Tournament: T6: 1984
- PGA Championship: T36: 1986
- U.S. Open: T13: 1989
- The Open Championship: CUT: 1977

Achievements and awards
- PGA Tour of Australia Order of Merit winner: 1976

Mark Ryan Lye (born November 13, 1952) is an American professional golfer. He played on the PGA Tour of Australasia, PGA Tour, and the Champions Tour.

== Early life and amateur career ==
In 1952, Lye was born in Vallejo, California.

Lye attended San Jose State University, where he was a three-time All-American on the golf team. He graduated in 1975.

== Professional career ==
In 1975, Lye turned pro. Early in his career, he played in Australia. Lye won the PGA Tour of Australia's 1976 Colgate Champion of Champions by one stroke over New Zealand's Simon Owen and two over Australia's Kel Nagle. Lye did not even expect to stay in Australia after he failed to qualify for that year's Australian Open. A friend encouraged him to remain and play in the Melbourne event. After a 70-71 start, he was three under, six shots behind Nagle. Lye then shot 68-67 to defeat a field that included, in addition to Owen and Nagle, 1975 U.S. Open champion Lou Graham, 1975 Open Championship winner Tom Watson, and recent Australian Tour champion Greg Norman. Lye went on to win the 1976 PGA Tour of Australia Order of Merit.

Lye joined the PGA Tour in 1977. He was a full-time member of tour from 1977 to 1991. In 1980 he finished 39th on the money list, with two runner-up finishes. Three years later, in 1983, he recorded his only victory on the PGA Tour, at the Bank of Boston Classic. Lye was eight shots behind in a tie for 16th when the round started. He did not hold even a share of the lead until the 69th hole of the tournament. He birdied three of the final four holes for a 64 (−7) to win by one shot. Later in the fall, at the last event of the season, he had a runner-up finish at the Pensacola Open. He had six top-10s in total for 1983, his most ever, and finished 28th on the money list, his best ever.

Lye's win qualified him for the 1984 Masters Tournament. He shot first round 69 (−3) and then surged to a three shot lead after a 66. He fell back a little after a third round 73 but was still in second place, one behind Tom Kite. He had a final round of 74, finishing T-6, his best finish in a major championship. Lye had an additional four top-10s in 1984 and finished 43rd on the money list.

In 1995, at the age of 43, Lye tore a ligament in his right hand at the FedEx St. Jude Classic and retired from the tour. He then began working as an analyst for The Golf Channel, eventually rising to lead analyst for men's tournament coverage. After reaching the age of 50 in November 2002, Lye joined the Champions Tour as a part-time player. His best finish on that tour was a solo 9th at the 2004 Greater Hickory Classic at Rock Barn. To compete in select Champions Tour events, Lye transitioned to being an on-course reporter.

In August 2015, Lye was hired as one of the cohosts of "The Scorecard," a pregame show for Saturday and Sunday rounds of every broadcast PGA Tour event, on SiriusXM. He was fired in February 2022 after making negative on-air comments about women's sports.

== Personal life ==
Lye plays guitar, in particular blues guitar, and has played with a member of Eric Clapton's band. Late in his career he formed Jake Trout and the Flounders, a cover band with fellow professional golfers Payne Stewart and Peter Jacobsen.

Lye is diabetic and has had additional health issues. Lye has battled melanoma. He first discovered a dime-sized mole on his left knee in 1991 and had surgery to remove it. He was cancer free for more than five years; however, in 2002, a small growth on his left thigh was discovered. He had surgery and other aggressive treatments for this recurrence and remains under a doctor's care. Influenced by his cancer diagnosis he became a born-again Christian.

Lye lives in Naples, Florida. He and his wife Lisa have two children, Lucas and Eva.

Lye served as script consultant for the 1996 film Happy Gilmore.

== Awards and honors ==
- In 1976, Lye won the Order of Merit for the PGA Tour of Australia.
- In 2007, Lye was inducted into the California Golf Writers Hall of Fame.

== Professional wins (2) ==
=== PGA Tour wins (1) ===
No.	Date	Tournament	Winning score	Margin of victory	Runners-up
1	Sep 11, 1983	Bank of Boston Classic	−11 (69-69-71-64=273)	1 stroke	(United States) John Mahaffey, (United States) Sammy Rachels, (United States) Jim Thorpe

=== PGA Tour of Australia wins (1) ===
No.	Date	Tournament	Winning score	Margin of victory	Runners-up
1	Nov 14, 1976	Colgate Champion of Champions	−12 (71-70-68-67=276)	1 stroke	(New Zealand) Simon Owen

== Results in major championships ==
Tournament	1977	1978	1979
Masters Tournament			
U.S. Open			
The Open Championship	CUT		
PGA Championship			

Tournament	1980	1981	1982	1983	1984	1985	1986	1987	1988	1989
Masters Tournament					T6	T36				
U.S. Open	T25	69			CUT		T45	CUT	T36	T13
The Open Championship										
PGA Championship	CUT	T56	T67	T63	T54	T47	T36			

Tournament	1990	1991	1992	1993	1994
Masters Tournament	T39				
U.S. Open	CUT				CUT
The Open Championship					
PGA Championship	WD				

Top 10
Did not play

WD = withdrew
CUT = missed the half-way cut
"T" indicates a tie for a place

== See also ==
- Fall 1976 PGA Tour Qualifying School graduates
