= David Ogrin =

American professional golfer (born 1957)

Personal information
- Nationality: United States
- Born: December 31, 1957 (age 68) Waukegan, Illinois, U.S.
- Height: 6 ft 0 in (1.83 m)
- Weight: 220 lb (100 kg; 16 st)

Career
- Sport: Golf
- College: Texas A&M University
- Turned professional: 1980
- Former tours: PGA Tour; Champions Tour
- Professional wins: 6
- Highest ranking: 52 (September 28, 1997)

Number of wins by tour
- PGA Tour: 1
- Other: 5

Best results in major championships
- Masters Tournament: 45th: 1984
- PGA Championship: T36: 1996
- U.S. Open: T10: 1997
- The Open Championship: DNP

David Ogrin (born December 31, 1957) is an American professional golfer.

== Early life and amateur career ==
Ogrin was born and grew up in Waukegan, Illinois. He graduated from Waukegan East High School in 1976, then attended Texas A&M University, graduating in 1980 with a degree in economics. In 1980, he won the Illinois Open and the Illinois State Amateur tournament, something not done again until 2017.

== Professional career ==
In 1980, Ogrin turned professional. Ogrin played on the PGA Tour from 1983 to 1999. In over 500 starts, he had 32 top-10 finishes including a win at the 1996 LaCantera Texas Open. He also played on the Nationwide Tour where his best finish was a T-3 at the 1993 NIKE Connecticut Open

Ogrin joined the Champions Tour in 2008. His best finish is a T-24 at the 2009 Dick's Sporting Goods Open.

Ogrin and Tim Nugent, a golf course architect, designed High Meadow Ranch Golf Club, an 18-hole public course in Magnolia, Texas, that features three six-hole loops.

== Personal life ==
Ogrin is a big fan of the Chicago Cubs; his son Clark Addison Ogrin was named after two streets near the Cubs' baseball stadium.

== Professional wins (6) ==
=== PGA Tour wins (1) ===
No.	Date	Tournament	Winning score	Margin of victory	Runner-up
1	Oct 13, 1996	LaCantera Texas Open	−13 (70-65-68-72=275)	1 stroke	(United States) Jay Haas

PGA Tour playoff record (0–2)

No.	Year	Tournament	Opponent(s)	Result
1	1985	St. Jude Memphis Classic	(United States) Hal Sutton	Lost to birdie on first extra hole
2	1994	GTE Byron Nelson Golf Classic	(United States) Tom Byrum, (United States) Mark Carnevale, (United States) David Edwards, (United States) Neal Lancaster, (Japan) Yoshi Mizumaki	Lancaster won with birdie on first extra hole

=== Other wins (5) ===
- 1980 Illinois Open Championship (as an amateur)
- 1987 Deposit Guaranty Golf Classic
- 1988 Peru Open
- 1989 Chrysler Team Championship (with Ted Schulz)
- 1994 Peru Open

== Playoff record ==
Asia Golf Circuit playoff record (0–1)

No.	Year	Tournament	Opponents	Result
1	1982	Malaysian Open	(United States) Denny Hepler, (Taiwan) Hsieh Min-Nan	Hepler won with birdie on second extra hole

== Results in major championships ==
Tournament	1979	1980	1981	1982	1983	1984	1985	1986	1987	1988	1989
Masters Tournament						45					
U.S. Open	CUT				T13	T38		T62	74		T54
PGA Championship						CUT	T47				CUT

Tournament	1990	1991	1992	1993	1994	1995	1996	1997	1998
Masters Tournament								CUT	CUT
U.S. Open					CUT		T67	T10	CUT
PGA Championship							T36	T41	T44

Note: Ogrin never played in The Open Championship.

Top 10
Did not play

CUT = missed the half-way cut
"T" = tied

=== Summary ===
Tournament	Wins	2nd	3rd	Top-5	Top-10	Top-25	Events	Cuts made
Masters Tournament	0	0	0	0	0	0	3	1
U.S. Open	0	0	0	0	1	2	10	7
The Open Championship	0	0	0	0	0	0	0	0
PGA Championship	0	0	0	0	0	0	6	4
Totals	0	0	0	0	1	2	19	12

- Most consecutive cuts made – 4 (1985 PGA – 1989 U.S. Open)
- Longest streak of top-10s – 1

== See also ==
- 1982 PGA Tour Qualifying School graduates
- 1991 PGA Tour Qualifying School graduates
- 1992 PGA Tour Qualifying School graduates
