= Danny Edwards =

American professional golfer

Personal information
- Nationality: United States
- Born: June 14, 1951 (age 75) Ketchikan, Alaska, U.S.
- Height: 5 ft 11 in (1.80 m)
- Weight: 155 lb (70 kg; 11.1 st)

Career
- Sport: Golf
- College: Oklahoma State University
- Turned professional: 1973
- Former tours: PGA Tour; Champions Tour
- Professional wins: 9

Number of wins by tour
- PGA Tour: 5
- Japan Golf Tour: 1
- Other: 3

Best results in major championships
- Masters Tournament: T18: 1984
- PGA Championship: T20: 1983
- U.S. Open: T12: 1982
- The Open Championship: T5: 1974

Richard Dan Edwards (born June 14, 1951) is an American professional golfer who has played on the PGA Tour, Nationwide Tour and Champions Tour.

== Early life ==
In 1951, Edwards was born in Ketchikan, Alaska. He started playing golf at age 14 and nearly four years later won the Oklahoma State High School Championship.

He is the older brother of former PGA Tour player David Edwards.

== Amateur career ==
Edwards attended Oklahoma State University in Stillwater, Oklahoma and was a four-year starter on the golf team. He won the 1972 and 1973 Big Eight Conference Championships, the 1972 North and South Amateur, and was a three-time All-American. He was the lone unbeaten player on the 1973 Walker Cup team and that same year, while on his first trip to Europe, finished as the Low Amateur in the British Open.

== Professional career ==
In 1973, Edwards turned professional. In 1975, he joined the PGA Tour and won five official tour events. His first victory came at the 1977 Greater Greensboro Open – the only event he would win twice. His best finish in a major was T-5 at the 1974 British Open. Edwards would earn more than three dozen top-10 finishes in Tour events; his final win came at the 1985 Pensacola Open.

In 1982, two months after winning his second Greater Greensboro Open he donned a racing helmet and won the June Sprints, one of the country's most prestigious automobile races, in Elkhart Lake, Wisconsin. He is the only PGA Tour professional to accomplish the crossover victory feat in the two sports.

In the summer of 1988, after 14 years on the PGA Tour, and never losing exempt status, Edwards stepped away from competitive golf and founded Royal Grip Inc., in Scottsdale, Arizona. The company would become its own revolution in advancing and improving perhaps the most essential piece of golf equipment. In 1998, Edwards became CEO of GreenFix Golf, a company that manufactures a tool that enables players and maintenance crews to repair ball marks to golf greens. In 2019, he founded The Chipping Equation, a simple system designed to help golfers of all skill levels learn and improve an often-overlooked part of the game.

In April 2022, Edwards wrote his first book, DRIVEN - The Danny Edwards Story (with Bob Denney), which was published by Classics of Golf, www.ClassicsofGolf.com, Amazon, Kindle, and Apple.

== Personal life ==
Edwards lives in Wellington, Florida.

== Amateur wins ==
- 1972 North and South Amateur, Southeastern Amateur

== Professional wins (9) ==
=== PGA Tour wins (5) ===
No.	Date	Tournament	Winning score	Margin of victory	Runner(s)-up
1	Apr 3, 1977	Greater Greensboro Open	−12 (68-68-68-72=276)	4 strokes	(United States) George Burns, (United States) Larry Nelson
2	Oct 19, 1980	Walt Disney World National Team Championship (with (United States) David Edwards)	−35 (60-63-65-65=253)	2 strokes	(United States) Gibby Gilbert and (United States) Grier Jones, (Canada) Dan Halldorson and (United States) Dana Quigley, (United States) Mike Harmon and (United States) Barry Harwell
3	Apr 5, 1982	Greater Greensboro Open (2)	−3 (66-72-72-75=285)	1 stroke	(United States) Bobby Clampett
4	Jul 17, 1983	Miller High Life QCO	−14 (66-64-69-67=266)	Playoff	(United States) Morris Hatalsky
5	Oct 20, 1985	Pensacola Open	−15 (67-68-67-67=269)	1 stroke	(United States) John Mahaffey, (United States) Gil Morgan

PGA Tour playoff record (1–0)

No.	Year	Tournament	Opponent	Result
1	1983	Miller High Life QCO	(United States) Morris Hatalsky	Won with birdie on first extra hole

=== PGA of Japan Tour wins (1) ===
No.	Date	Tournament	Winning score	Margin of victory	Runners-up
1	Nov 15, 1981	Toshiba Taiheiyo Masters	−12 (67-70-69-70=276)	3 strokes	(United States) Jerry Pate, (United States) Tom Watson

=== Other wins (3) ===
- 1975 Oklahoma Open
- 1977 Oklahoma Open
- 1979 Oklahoma Open

== Results in major championships ==
Tournament	1972	1973	1974	1975	1976	1977	1978	1979
Masters Tournament						T19	CUT	
U.S. Open	CUT		CUT	CUT	T19	CUT	CUT	
The Open Championship		T39_{LA}	T5	T23	T60			
PGA Championship						T36	T38	

Tournament	1980	1981	1982	1983	1984	1985	1986	1987	1988	1989	1990
Masters Tournament			T24	T36	T18	T47	T28				
U.S. Open			T12	CUT		T44	CUT	T24	T40		CUT
The Open Championship			CUT				T21	T29			
PGA Championship	T59	T61	T22	T20	T39	T47	CUT	CUT			

Top 10
Did not play

_{LA} = Low amateur
CUT = Missed the half-way cut (3rd round cut in 1982 Open Championship)
"T" indicates a tie for a place

=== Summary ===
Tournament	Wins	2nd	3rd	Top-5	Top-10	Top-25	Events	Cuts made
Masters Tournament	0	0	0	0	0	3	7	6
U.S. Open	0	0	0	0	0	3	13	5
The Open Championship	0	0	0	1	1	3	7	6
PGA Championship	0	0	0	0	0	2	10	8
Totals	0	0	0	1	1	11	37	25

- Most consecutive cuts made – 7 (1983 PGA – 1986 Masters)
- Longest streak of top-10s – 1

== U.S. national team appearances ==
Amateur

- Walker Cup: 1973 (winners)

== See also ==
- 1974 PGA Tour Qualifying School graduates
