= Willie Wood (golfer) =

American professional golfer (born 1960)

Personal information
- Full name: Willard West Wood Jr.
- Nationality: United States
- Born: October 1, 1960 (age 66) Kingsville, Texas, U.S.
- Height: 5 ft 7 in (1.70 m)
- Weight: 145 lb (66 kg; 10.4 st)

Career
- Sport: Golf
- College: Oklahoma State University
- Turned professional: 1983
- Current tour: PGA Tour Champions
- Former tours: PGA Tour; Nationwide Tour
- Professional wins: 7

Number of wins by tour
- PGA Tour: 1
- PGA Tour Champions: 2
- Other: 4

Best results in major championships
- Masters Tournament: T12: 1997
- PGA Championship: T23: 1985
- U.S. Open: T17: 1992
- The Open Championship: DNP

Achievements and awards
- Haskins Award: 1982

Willard West Wood Jr. (born October 1, 1960) is an American professional golfer who has played on the PGA Tour, Nationwide Tour, and PGA Tour Champions.

== Early life ==
Wood was born in Kingsville, Texas. He had an outstanding junior career, winning the 1977 U.S. Junior Amateur, the 1978 PGA Junior, and the 1979 Western Junior, and was named the 1978 AJGA Rolex Player of the Year.

== Amateur career ==
He attended Oklahoma State University in Stillwater, Oklahoma and was a star member of the golf team, where he played alongside Bob Tway, Scott Verplank, and Tommy Moore. He played in the 1983 Walker Cup.

== Professional career ==
In 1983, Wood joined the PGA Tour by being medalist at 1983 PGA Tour Qualifying School. Wood has split his playing time between the PGA Tour and the Nationwide Tour. He has 23 top-10 finishes on the PGA Tour including a win at the 1996 Deposit Guaranty Golf Classic, and 12 top-10 finishes on the Nationwide Tour. His best finish in a major championship was T12 at the 1997 Masters.

After turning 50 in late 2010, Wood played his first Champion Tour event, the AT&T Championship, where he finished T13. He won the Dick's Sporting Goods Open at En-Joie Golf Club in Endicott, New York on August 19, 2012, by defeating Michael Allen on the first hole of a sudden-death playoff for his first victory on the Champions Tour.

== Personal life ==
Willie Wood and his wife Holly had two children. In October 1988, Holly Wood was diagnosed with Ewing's sarcoma. She died ten months later.

Wood has a sister, Deanie, who was a member of the LPGA Tour. He makes his home in Edmond, Oklahoma and is a member of the "Oak Tree Gang", a group of touring professionals who all play at Oak Tree National in Edmond.

== Amateur wins ==
- 1977 U.S. Junior Amateur
- 1978 Junior PGA Championship, AJGA Tournament of Champions
- 1979 Western Junior

== Professional wins (8) ==
=== PGA Tour wins (1) ===
No.	Date	Tournament	Winning score	Margin of victory	Runner-up
1	Jul 21, 1996	Deposit Guaranty Golf Classic	−20 (68-67-66-67=268)	1 stroke	(United States) Kirk Triplett

PGA Tour playoff record (0–1)

No.	Year	Tournament	Opponent	Result
1	1990	Hardee's Golf Classic	(United States) Joey Sindelar	Lost to par on first extra hole

=== Other wins (4) ===
- 1979 Nevada Open (as an amateur)
- 1984 Colorado Open
- 1990 Oklahoma Open
- 1995 Oklahoma Open

=== Champions Tour wins (2) ===
No.	Date	Tournament	Winning score	Margin of victory	Runner-up
1	Aug 19, 2012	Dick's Sporting Goods Open	−13 (68-67-68=203)	Playoff	(United States) Michael Allen
2	Sep 15, 2012	Pacific Links Hawai'i Championship	−14 (68-68-66=202)	1 stroke	(United States) Bill Glasson

Champions Tour playoff record (1–0)

No.	Year	Tournament	Opponent	Result
1	2012	Dick's Sporting Goods Open	(United States) Michael Allen	Won with par on first extra hole

== Results in major championships ==
Tournament	1980	1981	1982	1983	1984	1985	1986	1987	1988	1989
Masters Tournament			T41							
U.S. Open	CUT					CUT				
PGA Championship						T23	CUT			

Tournament	1990	1991	1992	1993	1994	1995	1996	1997	1998	1999
Masters Tournament								T12	T21	CUT
U.S. Open			T17	CUT					CUT	
PGA Championship								T13		

Tournament	2000	2001
Masters Tournament		
U.S. Open		CUT
PGA Championship		

Note: Wood never played in The Open Championship.

Did not play

CUT = missed the half-way cut
"T" = tied

== Results in senior major championships ==
Results not in chronological order prior.

Tournament	2011	2012	2013	2014	2015	2016	2017	2018	2019	2020	2021	2022	2023	2024	2025
The Tradition				T25	T52	T15	T42	T68	T6	NT					
Senior PGA Championship	T45	T12		T39	T40	CUT	CUT	CUT		NT	T34		T63		
Senior Players Championship		T12	T47	T35	T10	T44	T46	T28	68	T19	T52				
U.S. Senior Open	T29		T35	T49	T38				CUT	NT		T53			CUT
Senior British Open Championship	CUT		T45	T34		T63	T31			NT					

Top 10
Did not play

CUT = missed the halfway cut
"T" indicates a tie for a place
NT = no tournament due to COVID-19 pandemic

== U.S. national team appearances ==
Amateur

- Walker Cup: 1983 (winners)

== See also ==
- 1983 PGA Tour Qualifying School graduates
- 1992 PGA Tour Qualifying School graduates
