= David Edwards (golfer) =

American professional golfer (born 1956)

Personal information
- Full name: David Wayne Edwards
- Nationality: United States
- Born: April 18, 1956 (age 70) Neosho, Missouri, U.S.
- Height: 5 ft 8 in (1.73 m)
- Weight: 165 lb (75 kg; 11.8 st)

Career
- Sport: Golf
- College: Oklahoma State University
- Turned professional: 1978
- Current tour: Champions Tour
- Former tour: PGA Tour
- Professional wins: 7
- Highest ranking: 25 (May 30, 1993)

Number of wins by tour
- PGA Tour: 4
- PGA Tour Champions: 1
- Other: 2

Best results in major championships
- Masters Tournament: T3: 1984
- PGA Championship: T14: 1987
- U.S. Open: T11: 1993
- The Open Championship: T46: 1994

David Wayne Edwards (born April 18, 1956) is an American professional golfer who played on the PGA Tour from 1979–2005 and now plays on the Champions Tour.

== Early life ==
In 1956, Edwards was born in Neosho, Missouri. He is the younger brother of former PGA Tour professional, Danny Edwards.

== Amateur career ==
Edwards attended Oklahoma State University in Stillwater, Oklahoma and was a distinguished member of the golf team — a first-team All-American his junior and senior years. Edwards and teammate, Lindy Miller, led the Cowboys to the 1976 and 1978 NCAA Championships. Edwards was the individual medalist at the 1978 tournament in his senior year.

== Professional career ==
In 1978, Edwards turned pro. He was successful at Fall 1978 PGA Tour Qualifying School and joined the PGA Tour in 1979.

Edwards had more than 65 top-10 finishes in PGA Tour events and won four times (the first one was a Championship he shared with his brother). His best finish in a major was T-3 at the 1984 Masters. In 1987, at the Shearson Lehman Brothers Andy Williams Open, Edwards scored a double eagle at Torrey Pines Golf Course with a driver-driver to the 18th green in the third round of play. During his late forties, Edwards split his playing time between the PGA Tour and the Nationwide Tour as do so many golfers at that stage who are preparing for the Champions Tour.

Edwards became eligible for the Champions Tour in April 2006, and won his first title at the 3M Championship in August of that year.

== Personal life ==
Edwards lives in Edmond, Oklahoma. He is a serious pilot who flies his own plane to tournaments.

== Professional wins (7) ==
=== PGA Tour wins (4) ===
No.	Date	Tournament	Winning score	Margin of victory	Runner(s)-up
1	Oct 19, 1980	Walt Disney World National Team Championship (with (United States) Danny Edwards)	−35 (60-63-65-65=253)	2 strokes	(United States) Gibby Gilbert and (United States) Grier Jones, (Canada) Dan Halldorson and (United States) Dana Quigley, (United States) Mike Harmon and (United States) Barry Harwell
2	Feb 19, 1984	Los Angeles Open	−5 (70-73-72-64=279)	3 strokes	(United States) Jack Renner
3	Jun 7, 1992	Memorial Tournament	−15 (71-65-70-67=273)	Playoff	(United States) Rick Fehr
4	Apr 18, 1993	MCI Heritage Golf Classic	−11 (68-66-70-69=273)	2 strokes	(South Africa) David Frost

PGA Tour playoff record (1–1)

No.	Year	Tournament	Opponent(s)	Result
1	1992	Memorial Tournament	(United States) Rick Fehr	Won with par on second extra hole
2	1994	GTE Byron Nelson Golf Classic	(United States) Tom Byrum, (United States) Mark Carnevale, (United States) Neal Lancaster, (Japan) Yoshi Mizumaki, (United States) David Ogrin	Lancaster won with birdie on first extra hole

=== Other wins (2) ===
- 1994 Oklahoma Open
- 1996 Oklahoma Open

=== Champions Tour wins (1) ===
No.	Date	Tournament	Winning score	Margin of victory	Runners-up
1	Aug 6, 2006	3M Championship	−12 (69-68-67=204)	2 strokes	(United States) Brad Bryant, (United States) Craig Stadler

== Results in major championships ==
Tournament	1978	1979
Masters Tournament		
U.S. Open	CUT	T53
The Open Championship		
PGA Championship		

Tournament	1980	1981	1982	1983	1984	1985	1986	1987	1988	1989
Masters Tournament					T3	T41				
U.S. Open	T28					CUT			T54	CUT
The Open Championship										
PGA Championship	T30	T16		CUT	T37		68	T14	T25	T41

Tournament	1990	1991	1992	1993	1994	1995	1996
Masters Tournament				T54	T18	T24	CUT
U.S. Open				T11	T13	T62	CUT
The Open Championship				CUT	T47		
PGA Championship		T32	T40	CUT	T44		T17

Top 10
Did not play

CUT = missed the half-way cut
"T" indicates a tie for a place

=== Summary ===
Tournament	Wins	2nd	3rd	Top-5	Top-10	Top-25	Events	Cuts made
Masters Tournament	0	0	1	1	1	3	6	5
U.S. Open	0	0	0	0	0	2	10	6
The Open Championship	0	0	0	0	0	0	2	1
PGA Championship	0	0	0	0	0	4	13	11
Totals	0	0	1	1	1	9	31	23

- Most consecutive cuts made – 6 (1994 Masters – 1995 U.S. Open)
- Longest streak of top-10s – 1

== Results in The Players Championship ==
Tournament	1979	1980	1981	1982	1983	1984	1985	1986	1987	1988	1989	1990	1991	1992	1993	1994	1995	1996	1997	1998
The Players Championship	CUT	79	CUT	CUT	T35	T15	CUT	T19	T32	T48	T21	T36	T41	T35	T46	T51	CUT	CUT	T14	CUT

CUT = missed the halfway cut
"T" indicates a tie for a place

== See also ==
- Fall 1978 PGA Tour Qualifying School graduates
- 1999 PGA Tour Qualifying School graduates
