= Dan Forsman =

American professional golfer (born 1958)

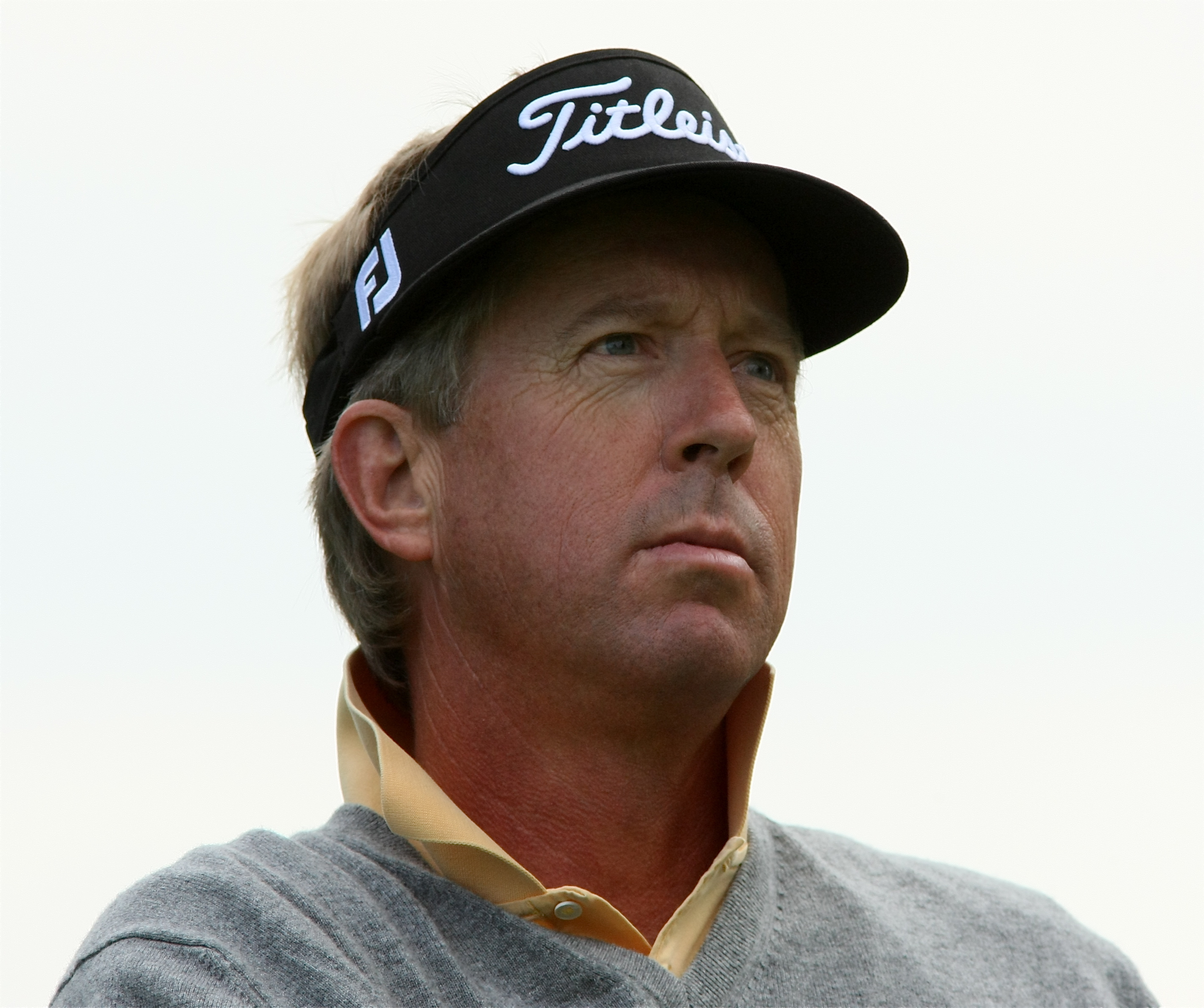

Personal information
- Full name: Daniel Bruce Forsman
- Nationality: United States
- Born: July 15, 1958 (age 68) Rhinelander, Wisconsin, U.S.
- Height: 6 ft 4 in (1.93 m)
- Weight: 210 lb (95 kg; 15 st)
- Spouse: Trudy
- Children: Richard, Thomas

Career
- Sport: Golf
- College: Arizona State University
- Turned professional: 1982
- Current tour: Champions Tour
- Former tour: PGA Tour
- Professional wins: 9
- Highest ranking: 33 (July 25, 1993)

Number of wins by tour
- PGA Tour: 5
- PGA Tour Champions: 3
- Other: 1

Best results in major championships
- Masters Tournament: T7: 1993
- PGA Championship: T7: 1992
- U.S. Open: T13: 1996
- The Open Championship: T73: 1993

Daniel Bruce Forsman (born July 15, 1958) is an American professional golfer who played on the PGA Tour and who now plays on the Champions Tour.

== Early life ==
In 1958, Forsman was born in Rhinelander, Wisconsin. However his family shortly relocated to Mountain View, California which is where he grew up. He learned to play golf at Los Altos Golf and Country Club and spent summers caddying for club members. He attended Awalt High School (currently Mountain View High School) where he lettered on both the golf and basketball teams.

Forsman attended Arizona State University where he majored in Communications. While at ASU, he was also on the golf team.

== Professional career ==
In 1982, Forsman turned professional. He earned his PGA Tour card at Qualifying School at the TPC Sawgrass in Ponte Vedra Beach, Florida in the fall of 1982 and joined the PGA Tour in 1983. A five-time winner on the PGA Tour, Forsman finished in the top-125 every year from 1983 until 2003 with the exception of one year. His best overall season was 1992, when he finished 10th on the money list with a win and three second-place finishes. He lost his card in 2004, but continued to play relatively well during his late forties.

After reaching the age of 50 in July 2008, Forsman began play on the Champions Tour. He won his first title in this venue in his rookie year at the 2009 AT&T Champions Classic where he shot a final round of 6 under par, came from 5 shots back, and defeated Don Pooley in a playoff with a birdie on the first playoff hole. His second win came a year later at the Regions Charity Classic. His third win came at the 2012 Mitsubishi Electric Championship at Hualalai.

== Personal life ==
Forsman is married to the former Trudy Holley. They settled in Provo, Utah, where they raised their two sons Richard and Thomas.

== Professional wins (9) ==
=== PGA Tour wins (5) ===
No.	Date	Tournament	Winning score	Margin of victory	Runner(s)-up
1	Jul 21, 1985	Lite Quad Cities Open	−13 (68-69-63-67=267)	1 stroke	(United States) Bob Tway
2	Mar 16, 1986	Hertz Bay Hill Classic	−11 (68-67-67=202) (Note: Shortened to 54 holes due to weather.)	1 stroke	(United States) Raymond Floyd, (United States) Mike Hulbert
3	Feb 18, 1990	Shearson Lehman Hutton Open	−13 (68-63-72-72=275)	2 strokes	(United States) Tommy Armour III
4	Aug 9, 1992	Buick Open	−12 (72-67-70-67=276)	Playoff	(Australia) Steve Elkington, (United States) Brad Faxon
5	Sep 15, 2002	SEI Pennsylvania Classic	−14 (73-68-64-65=270)	1 stroke	(Australia) Robert Allenby, (United States) Billy Andrade

PGA Tour playoff record (1–1)

No.	Year	Tournament	Opponent(s)	Result
1	1992	Buick Open	(Australia) Steve Elkington, (United States) Brad Faxon	Won with par on second extra hole Faxon eliminated by par on first hole
2	1997	Walt Disney World/Oldsmobile Classic	(United States) David Duval	Lost to par on first extra hole

=== Other wins (1) ===
No.	Date	Tournament	Winning score	Margin of victory	Runners-up
1	Dec 6, 1992	JCPenney Classic (with (United States) Dottie Mochrie)	−20 (66-63-66-69=264)	4 strokes	(United States) Beth Daniel and (United States) Davis Love III

=== Champions Tour wins (3) ===
No.	Date	Tournament	Winning score	Margin of victory	Runner(s)-up
1	Mar 15, 2009	AT&T Champions Classic	−11 (72-67-66=205)	Playoff	(United States) Don Pooley
2	May 16, 2010	Regions Charity Classic	−20 (68-62-66=196)	3 strokes	(Japan) Naomichi Ozaki, (Australia) Peter Senior
3	Jan 22, 2012	Mitsubishi Electric Championship at Hualalai	−15 (67-65-69=201)	2 strokes	(United States) Jay Don Blake

Champions Tour playoff record (1–0)

No.	Year	Tournament	Opponent	Result
1	2009	AT&T Champions Classic	(United States) Don Pooley	Won with birdie on first extra hole

== Results in major championships ==
Tournament	1982	1983	1984	1985	1986	1987	1988	1989
Masters Tournament					CUT			
U.S. Open	CUT		T60					T33
The Open Championship								
PGA Championship				CUT	CUT	CUT		CUT

Tournament	1990	1991	1992	1993	1994	1995	1996	1997	1998	1999
Masters Tournament	CUT			T7	14	T35		CUT		
U.S. Open	CUT		T60	T19			T13	CUT		
The Open Championship				T73						
PGA Championship	CUT	T32	T7	T44			T61			

Tournament	2000	2001	2002	2003	2004
Masters Tournament					
U.S. Open		T66		T48	CUT
The Open Championship					
PGA Championship				CUT	

Top 10
Did not play

CUT = missed the half-way cut
"T" = tied

=== Summary ===
Tournament	Wins	2nd	3rd	Top-5	Top-10	Top-25	Events	Cuts made
Masters Tournament	0	0	0	0	1	2	6	3
U.S. Open	0	0	0	0	0	2	11	7
The Open Championship	0	0	0	0	0	0	1	1
PGA Championship	0	0	0	0	1	1	10	4
Totals	0	0	0	0	2	5	28	15

- Most consecutive cuts made – 11 (1991 PGA – 1996 PGA)
- Longest streak of top-10s – 2 (1992 PGA – 1993 Masters)

== Results in The Players Championship ==
Tournament	1984	1985	1986	1987	1988	1989	1990	1991	1992	1993	1994	1995	1996	1997	1998	1999	2000	2001	2002	2003
The Players Championship	CUT	T13	CUT	T61	CUT	CUT	T36	75	63	T11	83	CUT	CUT	CUT	WD	T52	T73		CUT	CUT

Did not play

CUT = missed the halfway cut
WD = withdrew
"T" indicates a tie for a place

== Results in World Golf Championships ==
Tournament	2003
Match Play	
Championship	
Invitational	T11

Did not play

"T" = Tied

== See also ==
- 1982 PGA Tour Qualifying School graduates
- List of golfers with most PGA Tour wins
