= 1990 Players Championship =

Tournament information
- Dates: March 15–18, 1990
- Location: Ponte Vedra Beach, Florida; 30.198°N 81.394°W
- Courses: TPC Sawgrass, Stadium Course
- Tour: PGA Tour

Statistics
- Par: 72
- Length: 6,896 yards (6,306 m)
- Field: 144 players, 73 after cut
- Cut: 146 (+2)
- Prize fund: $1.5 million
- Winner's share: $270,000

Champion
- (United States) Jodie Mudd
- 278 (−10)

Location map
- Location in the United States Location in Florida

The 1990 Players Championship was a golf tournament in Florida on the PGA Tour, held March 15–18 at TPC Sawgrass in Ponte Vedra Beach, southeast of Jacksonville. It was the seventeenth Players Championship.

Jodie Mudd won the title at 278 (−10), one stroke ahead of runner-up Mark Calcavecchia.

Defending champion Tom Kite finished seven strokes back, in a tie for fifth place.

== Venue ==
This was the ninth Players Championship held at the TPC at Sawgrass Stadium Course. The Stadium Course was lengthened this year to 6,896 yards (6,306 m), an increase of 39 yards (36 m).

== Field ==
John Adams, Fulton Allem, Michael Allen, Billy Andrade, Isao Aoki, Tommy Armour III, Paul Azinger, Ian Baker-Finch, Dave Barr, Andy Bean, Chip Beck, Ronnie Black, Phil Blackmar, Jay Don Blake, Jim Booros, Bill Britton, Mark Brooks, Billy Ray Brown, Brad Bryant, George Burns, Clark Burroughs, Bill Buttner, Curt Byrum, Tom Byrum, Mark Calcavecchia, Jim Carter, Russ Cochran, Fred Couples, Ben Crenshaw, Jay Delsing, Clark Dennis, Mike Donald, Bob Eastwood, David Edwards, Joel Edwards, Dave Eichelberger, Steve Elkington, Bob Estes, Brad Faxon, Rick Fehr, Ed Fiori, Raymond Floyd, Dan Forsman, David Frost, Jim Gallagher Jr., Robert Gamez, Buddy Gardner, Bob Gilder, Bill Glasson, Wayne Grady, David Graham, Hubert Green, Ken Green, Jay Haas, Gary Hallberg, Jim Hallet, Donnie Hammond, Webb Heintzelman, Lon Hinkle, Scott Hoch, Mike Hulbert, John Inman, Hale Irwin, Peter Jacobsen, Steve Jones, Tom Kite, Kenny Knox, Wayne Levi, Bruce Lietzke, Bob Lohr, Davis Love III, Mark Lye, Sandy Lyle, Andrew Magee, John Mahaffey, Roger Maltbie, Billy Mayfair, Mark McCumber, Pat McGowan, Rocco Mediate, Larry Mize, Gil Morgan, Jodie Mudd, Larry Nelson, Jack Nicklaus, Greg Norman, Andy North, Mark O'Meara, David Ogrin, Masashi Ozaki, Craig Parry, Jerry Pate, Steve Pate, Corey Pavin, Calvin Peete, David Peoples, Chris Perry, Kenny Perry, Peter Persons, Don Pooley, Nick Price, Tom Purtzer, Mike Reid, Larry Rinker, Loren Roberts, Clarence Rose, Dave Rummells, Bill Sander, Gene Sauers, Ted Schulz, Don Shirey Jr., Tom Sieckmann, Tony Sills, Scott Simpson, Tim Simpson, Joey Sindelar, Jeff Sluman, J. C. Snead, Craig Stadler, Payne Stewart, Ray Stewart, Curtis Strange, Mike Sullivan, Hal Sutton, Lance Ten Broeck, Brian Tennyson, Doug Tewell, Leonard Thompson, Jim Thorpe, Kirk Triplett, Bob Tway, Greg Twiggs, Howard Twitty, Stan Utley, Bobby Wadkins, Lanny Wadkins, Duffy Waldorf, Denis Watson, Tom Watson, D. A. Weibring, Mark Wiebe, Robert Wrenn, Fuzzy Zoeller, Richard Zokol

== Round summaries ==
=== First round ===
Thursday, March 15, 1990

Place	Player	Score	To par
T1	(United States) Mark Calcavecchia	67	−5
T1	(United States) Jodie Mudd	67	−5
T3	(United States) David Edwards	68	−4
T3	(United States) David Graham	68	−4
T5	(United States) Clark Burroughs	69	−3
T5	(United States) Fred Couples	69	−3
T5	(United States) Bob Eastwood	69	−3
T5	(United States) Robert Gamez	69	−3
T5	(United States) David Ogrin	69	−3
T5	(United States) Steve Pate	69	−3
T5	(United States) Peter Persons	69	−3
T5	(Zimbabwe) Nick Price	69	−3
T5	(United States) Duffy Waldorf	69	−3
T5	(United States) Tom Watson	69	−3

=== Second round ===
Friday, March 16, 1990

Place	Player	Score	To par
1	(United States) Hale Irwin	70-68=138	−6
T2	(United States) Rocco Mediate	72-67=139	−5
T2	(United States) Jodie Mudd	67-72=139	−5
T4	(United States) Clark Burroughs	69-71=140	−4
T4	(United States) Ken Green	71-69=140	−4
T6	(United States) Andy Bean	73-68=141	−3
T6	(United States) David Edwards	68-73=141	−3
T6	(United States) Peter Jacobsen	74-67=141	−3
T6	(United States) Davis Love III	73-68=141	−3
T6	(United States) Tom Watson	69-72=141	−3

=== Third round ===
Saturday, March 17, 1990
Sunday, March 18, 1990

Due to weather delays, Mudd completed the last fourteen holes of his third round on Sunday morning.

Place	Player	Score	To par
1	(United States) Jodie Mudd	67-72-70=209	−7
T2	(United States) Mark Calcavecchia	67-75-68=210	−6
T2	(United States) Ken Green	71-69-70=210	−6
T4	(United States) Clark Burroughs	69-71-72=212	−4
T4	(United States) Hale Irwin	70-68-74=212	−4
T4	(United States) Tom Kite	72-70-70=212	−4
T7	(United States) Andy Bean	73-68-72=213	−2
T7	(United States) Tom Purtzer	71-73-69=213	−2
T9	(United States) Billy Ray Brown	73-72-69=214	−2
T9	(United States) Gene Sauers	71-73-70=214	−2

=== Final round ===
Sunday, March 18, 1990

Champion
(c) = past champion

Place	Player	Score	To par	Money ($)
1	(United States) Jodie Mudd	67-72-70-69=278	−10	270,000
2	(United States) Mark Calcavecchia	67-75-68-69=279	−9	162,000
T3	(United States) Steve Jones	75-71-69-69=284	−4	87,000
T3	(United States) Tom Purtzer	71-73-69-71=284	−4	87,000
T5	(United States) Billy Ray Brown	73-72-69-71=285	−3	52,687
T5	(United States) Ken Green	71-69-70-75=285	−3	52,687
T5	(United States) Hale Irwin	70-68-74-73=285	−3	52,687
T5	(United States) Tom Kite (c)	72-70-70-73=285	−3	52,687
T9	(United States) Andy Bean	73-68-72-73=286	−2	42,000
T9	(United States) Mark McCumber (c)	73-72-73-68=286	−2	42,000

Leaderboard below the top 10
Place	Player	Score	To par	Money ($)
T11	(South Africa) Fulton Allem	73-70-74-71=288	E	31,800
T11	(United States) Bruce Lietzke	75-70-70-73=288	E	31,800
T11	(United States) Rocco Mediate	72-67-76-73=288	E	31,800
T11	(United States) Steve Pate	69-76-71-72=288	E	31,800
T11	(United States) Payne Stewart	71-73-71-73=288	E	31,800
T16	(United States) Clark Burroughs	69-71-72-77=289	+1	20,362
T16	(Australia) Steve Elkington	71-72-74-72=289	+1	20,362
T16	(United States) Larry Nelson	71-73-74-71=289	+1	20,362
T16	(Australia) Greg Norman	71-76-74-68=289	+1	20,362
T16	(United States) David Ogrin	69-74-73-73=289	+1	20,362
T16	(United States) Chris Perry	73-74-72-70=289	+1	20,362
T16	(Zimbabwe) Nick Price	69-75-77-68=289	+1	20,362
T16	(United States) Curtis Strange	72-71-73-73=289	+1	20,362
T24	(United States) Jim Booros	70-74-73-73=290	+2	12,450
T24	(United States) Bill Glasson	71-73-72-74=290	+2	12,450
T24	(Australia) David Graham	68-75-74-73=290	+2	12,450
T24	(United States) Kenny Knox	73-73-75-69=290	+2	12,450
T24	(United States) Davis Love III	73-68-74-75=290	+2	12,450
T29	(United States) Mike Donald	76-71-72-72=291	+3	9,332
T29	(United States) Jim Gallagher Jr.	76-71-72-72=291	+3	9,332
T29	(Australia) Wayne Grady	72-72-74-73=291	+3	9,332
T29	(United States) Peter Jacobsen	74-67-75-75=291	+3	9,332
T29	(United States) Peter Persons	69-76-71-75=291	+3	9,332
T29	(United States) Gene Sauers	71-73-70-77=291	+3	9,332
T29	(United States) Tony Sills	72-74-76-69=291	+3	9,332
T36	(Canada) Dave Barr	71-75-73-73=292	+4	6,307
T36	(United States) Mark Brooks	70-75-73-74=292	+4	6,307
T36	(United States) David Edwards	68-73-75-76=292	+4	6,307
T36	(United States) Dan Forsman	72-71-74-75=292	+4	6,307
T36	(United States) Jim Hallet	72-72-76-72=292	+4	6,307
T36	(United States) Andrew Magee	74-71-73-74=292	+4	6,307
T36	(United States) Kirk Triplett	72-74-74-72=292	+4	6,307
T36	(United States) Bobby Wadkins	77-70-72-73=292	+4	6,307
T36	(United States) Tom Watson	69-72-81-70=292	+4	6,307
T36	(United States) D. A. Weibring	72-72-73-75=292	+4	6,307
T46	(Australia) Ian Baker-Finch	73-72-75-73=293	+5	3,855
T46	(United States) Robert Gamez	69-74-79-71=293	+5	3,855
T46	(United States) Hubert Green	72-74-75-72=293	+5	3,855
T46	(United States) Calvin Peete (c)	73-72-72-76=293	+5	3,855
T46	(United States) Mike Reid	71-72-77-73=293	+5	3,855
T46	(United States) Loren Roberts	71-73-75-74=293	+5	3,855
T46	(United States) Joey Sindelar	74-73-74-72=293	+5	3,855
T46	(United States) J. C. Snead	73-72-76-72=293	+5	3,855
T46	(United States) Mike Sullivan	73-74-73-73=293	+5	3,855
T46	(United States) Robert Wrenn	71-75-74-73=293	+5	3,855
T56	(United States) Bob Gilder	71-75-75-73=294	+6	3,375
T56	(United States) Kenny Perry	72-73-76-73=294	+6	3,375
T56	(United States) Bill Sander	71-75-77-71=294	+6	3,375
T56	(Canada) Richard Zokol	74-72-73-75=294	+6	3,375
60	(United States) Joel Edwards	72-74-73-76=295	+7	3,300
T61	(United States) Buddy Gardner	73-73-76-74=296	+8	3,210
T61	(United States) Mike Hulbert	71-76-80-69=296	+8	3,210
T61	(Australia) Craig Parry	74-71-70-81=296	+8	3,210
T61	(United States) Craig Stadler	70-73-81-72=296	+8	3,210
T61	(United States) Duffy Waldorf	69-77-79-71=296	+8	3,210
T66	(United States) Chip Beck	73-72-78-74=297	+9	3,105
T66	(United States) Ed Fiori	74-71-78-74=297	+9	3,105
T68	(United States) Bob Lohr	74-69-74-81=298	+10	3,045
T68	(United States) David Peoples	72-75-76-75=298	+10	3,045
T70	(United States) Bob Estes	74-72-76-77=299	+11	2,970
T70	(United States) Brad Faxon	73-70-77-79=299	+11	2,970
T70	(United States) Mark Lye	71-76-80-72=299	+11	2,970
CUT	(United States) Tommy Armour III	72-76=148	+4	
CUT	(United States) Bob Eastwood	69-79=148	+4	
CUT	(United States) Rick Fehr	71-77=148	+4	
CUT	(South Africa) David Frost	71-77=148	+4	
CUT	(United States) Donnie Hammond	76-72=148	+4	
CUT	(United States) Webb Heintzelman	73-75=148	+4	
CUT	(United States) Gil Morgan	74-74=148	+4	
CUT	(Japan) Masashi Ozaki	72-76=148	+4	
CUT	(United States) Don Shirey Jr.	73-75=148	+4	
CUT	(United States) Tim Simpson	72-76=148	+4	
CUT	(United States) Paul Azinger	72-77=149	+5	
CUT	(United States) Brad Bryant	71-78=149	+5	
CUT	(United States) Curt Byrum	76-73=149	+5	
CUT	(United States) Ben Crenshaw	74-75=149	+5	
CUT	(United States) Billy Mayfair	75-74=149	+5	
CUT	(United States) Larry Rinker	72-77=149	+5	
CUT	(United States) Dave Rummells	75-74=149	+5	
CUT	(Canada) Ray Stewart	72-77=149	+5	
CUT	(United States) Bob Tway	71-78=149	+5	
CUT	(United States) Jay Don Blake	74-76=150	+6	
CUT	(United States) Jim Carter	74-76=150	+6	
CUT	(United States) Fred Couples (c)	69-81=150	+6	
CUT	(Scotland) Sandy Lyle (c)	74-76=150	+6	
CUT	(United States) John Mahaffey (c)	74-76=150	+6	
CUT	(United States) Larry Mize	74-76=150	+6	
CUT	(United States) Andy North	76-74=150	+6	
CUT	(United States) Ted Schulz	71-79=150	+6	
CUT	(United States) Brian Tennyson	76-74=150	+6	
CUT	(United States) Stan Utley	76-74=150	+6	
CUT	(United States) Billy Andrade	74-77=151	+7	
CUT	(United States) Ronnie Black	75-76=151	+7	
CUT	(United States) Bill Britton	77-74=151	+7	
CUT	(United States) Russ Cochran	74-77=151	+7	
CUT	(United States) Dave Eichelberger	76-75=151	+7	
CUT	(United States) Jay Haas	72-79=151	+7	
CUT	(United States) Pat McGowan	77-74=151	+7	
CUT	(United States) Don Pooley	75-76=151	+7	
CUT	(United States) Lance Ten Broeck	72-79=151	+7	
CUT	(United States) Howard Twitty	79-72=151	+7	
CUT	(United States) Gary Hallberg	74-78=152	+8	
CUT	(United States) Jerry Pate (c)	75-77=152	+8	
CUT	(United States) Tom Sieckmann	72-80=152	+8	
CUT	(United States) Jeff Sluman	71-81=152	+8	
CUT	(United States) Hal Sutton (c)	77-75=152	+8	
CUT	(United States) Michael Allen	77-76=153	+9	
CUT	(United States) Bill Buttner	77-76=153	+9	
CUT	(United States) Lon Hinkle	76-77=153	+9	
CUT	(United States) John Inman	75-78=153	+9	
CUT	(United States) Jack Nicklaus (c)	75-78=153	+9	
CUT	(United States) Wayne Levi	77-77=154	+10	
CUT	(United States) Lanny Wadkins (c)	76-78=154	+10	
CUT	(United States) Mark Wiebe	76-78=154	+10	
CUT	(Japan) Isao Aoki	75-80=155	+11	
CUT	(United States) Jay Delsing	80-75=155	+11	
CUT	(United States) Raymond Floyd (c)	79-76=155	+11	
CUT	(United States) Corey Pavin	80-75=155	+11	
CUT	(United States) Clarence Rose	78-77=155	+11	
CUT	(United States) Leonard Thompson	76-79=155	+11	
CUT	(Zimbabwe) Denis Watson	80-75=155	+11	
CUT	(United States) Clark Dennis	75-81=156	+12	
CUT	(United States) Scott Simpson	79-77=156	+12	
CUT	(United States) Fuzzy Zoeller	80-77=157	+13	
CUT	(United States) Phil Blackmar	71-87=158	+14	
CUT	(United States) George Burns	76-82=158	+14	
CUT	(United States) Tom Byrum	78-81=159	+15	
CUT	(United States) Greg Twiggs	76-84=160	+16	
WD	(United States) Scott Hoch	75-72-85=232	+16	
WD	(United States) Doug Tewell	79-74=153	+9	
WD	(United States) Jim Thorpe	79-78=157	+13	
WD	(United States) Roger Maltbie	76-85=161	+17	
WD	(United States) John Adams	84	+12	
WD	(United States) Mark O'Meara	84	+12	
