= 1990 PGA Tour =

Golf tour season

1990 PGA Tour season
- Duration: January 4, 1990 – October 28, 1990
- Number of official events: 44
- Most wins: (United States) Wayne Levi (4)
- Money list: (Australia) Greg Norman
- PGA Tour Player of the Year: (United States) Wayne Levi
- PGA Player of the Year: (England) Nick Faldo
- Rookie of the Year: (United States) Robert Gamez

The 1990 PGA Tour was the 75th season of the PGA Tour, the main professional golf tour in the United States. It was also the 22nd season since separating from the PGA of America.

== Schedule ==
The following table lists official events during the 1990 season.

Date	Tournament	Location	Purse (US$)	Winner (Note: The number in parentheses after each winner's name is the number of PGA Tour events they had won up to and including that tournament. This information is only shown for PGA Tour members.)	OWGR points	Notes
Jan 7	MONY Tournament of Champions	California	750,000	(United States) Paul Azinger (6)	56	Winners-only event
Jan 14	Northern Telecom Tucson Open	Arizona	900,000	(United States) Robert Gamez (1)	42	
Jan 21	Bob Hope Chrysler Classic	California	1,000,000	(United States) Peter Jacobsen (4)	50	Pro-Am
Jan 28	Phoenix Open	Arizona	900,000	(United States) Tommy Armour III (1)	50	
Feb 4	AT&T Pebble Beach National Pro-Am	California	1,000,000	(United States) Mark O'Meara (5)	54	Pro-Am
Feb 11	Hawaiian Open	Hawaii	1,000,000	(United States) David Ishii (1)	42	
Feb 18	Shearson Lehman Hutton Open	California	900,000	(United States) Dan Forsman (3)	40	
Feb 25	Nissan Los Angeles Open	California	1,000,000	(United States) Fred Couples (4)	48	
Mar 4	Doral-Ryder Open	Florida	1,400,000	(Australia) Greg Norman (9)	62	
Mar 11	Honda Classic	Florida	1,000,000	(United States) John Huston (1)	48	
Mar 18	The Players Championship	Florida	1,500,000	(United States) Jodie Mudd (3)	80	Flagship event
Mar 25	Nestle Invitational	Florida	900,000	(United States) Robert Gamez (2)	72	Invitational
Apr 1	Independent Insurance Agent Open	Texas	1,000,000	(United States) Tony Sills (1)	44	
Apr 8	Masters Tournament	Georgia	1,250,000	(England) Nick Faldo (4)	100	Major championship
Apr 8	Deposit Guaranty Golf Classic	Mississippi	300,000	(United States) Gene Sauers (n/a)	16	Alternate event (Note: Official money; unofficial win.)
Apr 15	MCI Heritage Golf Classic	South Carolina	1,000,000	(United States) Payne Stewart (6)	58	Invitational
Apr 22	KMart Greater Greensboro Open	North Carolina	1,250,000	(Australia) Steve Elkington (1)	52	
Apr 29	USF&G Classic	Louisiana	1,000,000	(South Africa) David Frost (4)	46	
May 6	GTE Byron Nelson Golf Classic	Texas	1,000,000	(United States) Payne Stewart (7)	40	
May 13	Memorial Tournament	Ohio	1,000,000	(Australia) Greg Norman (10)	48	Invitational
May 20	Southwestern Bell Colonial	Texas	1,000,000	(United States) Ben Crenshaw (15)	54	Invitational
May 27	BellSouth Atlanta Golf Classic	Georgia	1,000,000	(United States) Wayne Levi (9)	42	
Jun 3	Kemper Open	Maryland	1,000,000	(United States) Gil Morgan (7)	36	
Jun 10	Centel Western Open	Illinois	1,000,000	(United States) Wayne Levi (10)	72	
Jun 18	U.S. Open	Illinois	1,200,000	(United States) Hale Irwin (18)	100	Major championship
Jun 24	Buick Classic	New York	1,000,000	(United States) Hale Irwin (19)	40	
Jul 1	Canon Greater Hartford Open	Connecticut	1,000,000	(United States) Wayne Levi (11)	42	
Jul 8	Anheuser-Busch Golf Classic	Virginia	1,000,000	(United States) Lanny Wadkins (19)	52	
Jul 15	Bank of Boston Classic	Massachusetts	900,000	(United States) Morris Hatalsky (4)	30	
Jul 22	The Open Championship	Scotland	£500,000	(England) Nick Faldo (5)	100	Major championship (Note: Unofficial money event at the time, but retrospectively counted as an official win.)
Jul 29	Buick Open	Michigan	1,000,000	(United States) Chip Beck (3)	38	
Aug 5	Federal Express St. Jude Classic	Tennessee	1,000,000	(United States) Tom Kite (14)	46	
Aug 12	PGA Championship	Alabama	1,350,000	(Australia) Wayne Grady (2)	100	Major championship
Aug 19	The International	Colorado	1,000,000	(United States) Davis Love III (2)	52	
Aug 26	NEC World Series of Golf	Ohio	1,100,000	(Spain) José María Olazábal (1)	60	Limited-field event
Aug 26	Chattanooga Classic	Tennessee	600,000	(United States) Peter Persons (1)	16	Alternate event
Sep 1	Greater Milwaukee Open	Wisconsin	900,000	(United States) Jim Gallagher Jr. (1)	46	
Sep 9	Hardee's Golf Classic	Illinois	1,000,000	(United States) Joey Sindelar (6)	42	
Sep 16	Canadian Open	Canada	1,000,000	(United States) Wayne Levi (12)	42	
Sep 23	B.C. Open	New York	700,000	(United States) Nolan Henke (1)	18	
Sep 30	Buick Southern Open	Georgia	600,000	(United States) Kenny Knox (3)	22	
Oct 7	H.E.B. Texas Open	Texas	800,000	(United States) Mark O'Meara (6)	48	
Oct 14	Las Vegas Invitational	Nevada	1,300,000	(United States) Bob Tway (6)	46	
Oct 20	Walt Disney World/Oldsmobile Classic	Florida	1,000,000	(United States) Tim Simpson (4)	52	
Oct 28	Nabisco Championship	Texas	2,500,000	(United States) Jodie Mudd (4)	56	Tour Championship

=== Unofficial events ===
The following events were sanctioned by the PGA Tour, but did not carry official money, nor were wins official.

Date	Tournament	Location	Purse ($)	Winner(s)	OWGR points	Notes
May 28	PGA Grand Slam of Golf	Hawaii	n/a	(United States) Andy North	n/a	Limited-field event
Nov 10	Isuzu Kapalua International	Hawaii	700,000	(United States) David Peoples	28	
Nov 18	RMCC Invitational	California	1,000,000	(United States) Fred Couples and (United States) Raymond Floyd	n/a	Team event
Nov 24	World Cup	Florida	1,100,000	(Germany) Torsten Giedeon and (Germany) Bernhard Langer	n/a	Team event
Nov 24	World Cup Individual Trophy	Florida	1,100,000	(United States) Payne Stewart	n/a	
Nov 25	Skins Game	California	450,000	(United States) Curtis Strange	n/a	Limited-field event
Dec 2	JCPenney Classic	Florida	1,000,000	(United States) Beth Daniel and (United States) Davis Love III	n/a	Team event
Dec 9	Sazale Classic	Florida	1,000,000	(United States) Fred Couples and (United States) Mike Donald	n/a	Team event

== Money list ==
The money list was based on prize money won during the season, calculated in U.S. dollars.

Position	Player	Prize money ($)
1	(Australia) Greg Norman	1,165,477
2	(United States) Wayne Levi	1,024,647
3	(United States) Payne Stewart	976,281
4	(United States) Paul Azinger	944,731
5	(United States) Jodie Mudd	911,746
6	(United States) Hale Irwin	838,249
7	(United States) Mark Calcavecchia	834,281
8	(United States) Tim Simpson	809,772
9	(United States) Fred Couples	757,999
10	(United States) Mark O'Meara	707,175

== Awards ==
Award	Winner	Ref.
PGA Tour Player of the Year (Jack Nicklaus Trophy)	(United States) Wayne Levi	
PGA Player of the Year	(England) Nick Faldo	
Rookie of the Year	(United States) Robert Gamez	
Scoring leader (PGA Tour – Byron Nelson Award)	(Australia) Greg Norman	
Scoring leader (PGA – Vardon Trophy)	(Australia) Greg Norman	

== See also ==
- 1990 Ben Hogan Tour
- 1990 Senior PGA Tour
