= Michelob Championship =

Golf tournament formerly on the PGA Tour

Coordinates: 37.225°N 76.668°W

Michelob Championship at Kingsmill
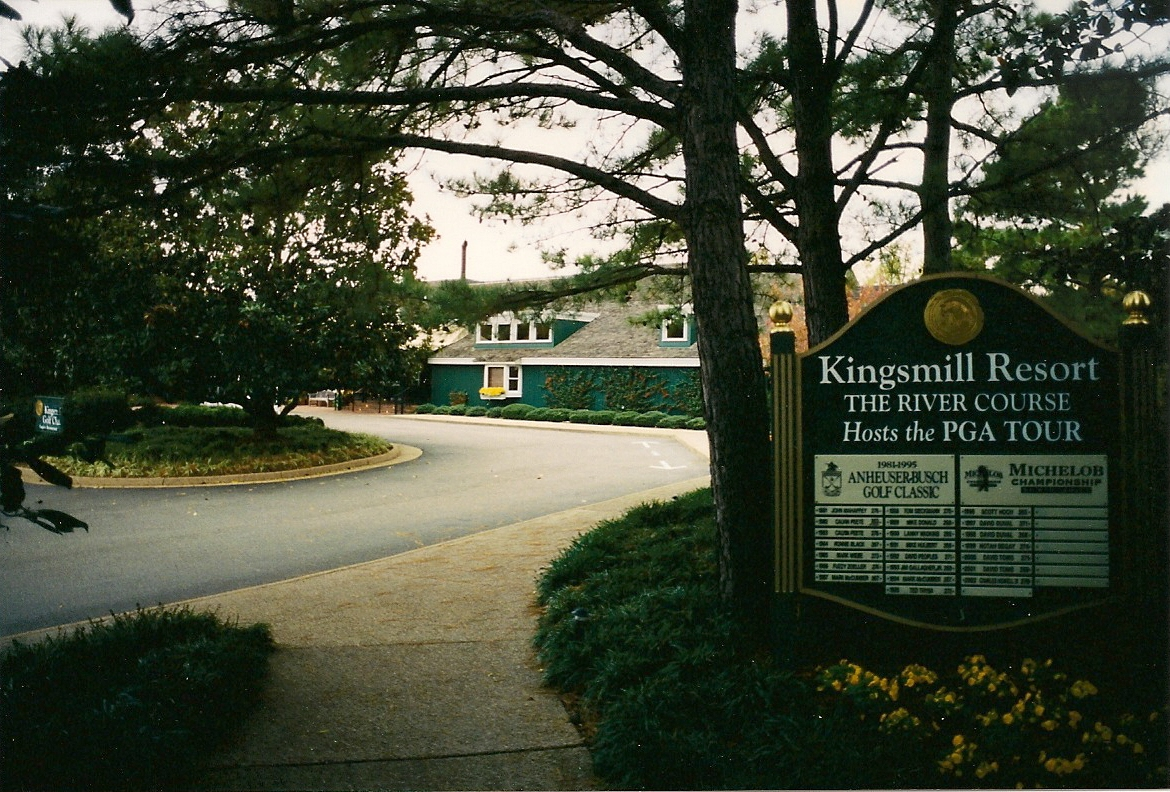
- Winners' sign at Kingsmill Resort

Tournament information
- Location: Williamsburg, Virginia
- Established: 1968
- Course: Kingsmill Resort
- Par: 71
- Length: 6,588 yards (6,024 m)
- Tour: PGA Tour
- Format: Stroke play
- Prize fund: US$3,700,000
- Month played: October
- Final year: 2002

Tournament record score
- Aggregate: 265 Scott Hoch (1996)
- To par: −19 Billy Casper (1971) −19 Scott Hoch (1996)

Final champion
- (United States) Charles Howell III
- Location in the United States Location in Virginia

The Michelob Championship at Kingsmill was a golf tournament on the PGA Tour from 1968 to 2002. It was played in Virginia at the River Course of Kingsmill Golf Club outside of Williamsburg, from 1981 to 2002. From 1977 through 1995, it was known as the Anheuser-Busch Golf Classic.

The event was founded in 1968 as the Kaiser International Open Invitational, which was played in northern California at Silverado Country Club in Napa through 1980. In its second year, it was played twice. At the second edition in January 1969, three days of rain washed out the final two rounds of play and 36-hole leader Miller Barber was declared the winner, but only half the prize money was distributed. The tournament was rescheduled for late October/early November and Jack Nicklaus was the winner in a four-man playoff, decided on the second extra hole on Monday.

The purse of the inaugural event in 1968 was $125,000, and Kermit Zarley took the winner's share of $25,000 in January for his first tour win. The final event in 2002 had a purse of $3.7 million, with a winner's share of $666,000 to Charles Howell III in early October.

From 2003 to 2009, an LPGA Tour event, the Michelob ULTRA Open at Kingsmill, was played at the same location. In 2012, the LPGA Tour event returned, renamed the Kingsmill Championship.

== Tournament highlights ==
- 1968: Kermit Zarley shot a final round 65 (–7) to win $25,000 at the inaugural event, a stroke ahead of Dave Marr.
- January 1969: For the first time ever, due to three days of steady rain a 72-hole PGA Tour tourney is called off after only 36 holes. Miller Barber was the winner by one shot over Bruce Devlin. The purse was also cut in half.
- November 1969: The Kaiser International is decided in a four-way playoff. Jack Nicklaus sank a 12-foot (3.7 m) birdie putt on the second extra hole to defeat George Archer and Billy Casper. Don January was eliminated on the first playoff hole, as the others made birdies. Darkness then caused play to be called until Monday morning, which had a fog delay.
- 1970: Ken Still makes a birdie on the first playoff hole to defeat Lee Trevino and Bert Yancey. Dave Hill misses the playoff by one shot after making a triple bogey on the 11th hole during the final round of play. Just before his disastrous hole, Hill and his playing partner Chi-Chi Rodríguez exchanged angry words which required an official to settle their clash.
- 1974: Johnny Miller collects his 8th triumph of the year and wins by eight shots over Casper and Trevino.
- 1975: Miller successfully defends his Kaiser title and finishes three shots ahead of Rod Curl.
- 1976: J. C. Snead foils Miller's attempt to win three straight at Kaiser; Snead shoots a final round 68 to finish two shots ahead of Miller and Gibby Gilbert.
- 1977: Miller Barber wins in Napa again, with a final round 65 to rally from six shots back and defeat George Archer by two shots.
- 1979: John Fought birdies the 72nd hole to win by one shot over Alan Tapie, Bobby Wadkins, and Buddy Gardner. It was Fought's second straight win on the PGA Tour.
- 1981: John Mahaffey wins the first edition in Virginia, two strokes ahead of Andy North.
- 1983: Calvin Peete rallies from six shots back to successfully defend his Anheuser-Busch title, one shot in front of Tim Norris. Hal Sutton squandered the large lead, but wins the PGA Championship two weeks later.
- 1984: Ronnie Black, seven shots behind when final round play began, shoots a 63 to win by one shot over Willie Wood.
- 1986: Fuzzy Zoeller has a final round 64 to win by two shots over Jodie Mudd.
- 1992: David Peoples bogeys the final two holes, but wins by one shot over Ed Dougherty, Jim Gallagher, and Bill Britton.
- 1996: Scott Hoch sets the 72-hole scoring mark at 265 (–19), with a four-shot victory over Tom Purtzer in July.
- 1997: David Duval, a future top-ranked player in the world and British Open champion, gains his first tour victory; he birdied the first playoff hole to defeat Grant Waite and Duffy Waldorf in mid-October.
- 1998: Duval successfully defends his Michelob title, three shots ahead of Phil Tataurangi.
- 1999: Tour rookie Notah Begay III notches his second victory in a playoff with Tom Byrum.
- 2001: David Toms, winner of the PGA Championship, successfully defends his Michelob title, one shot ahead of Kirk Triplett.
- 2002: Charles Howell III attains his first tour win and takes $666,000 at the final edition, two shots ahead of Brandt Jobe and Scott Hoch.

== Winners ==
Year	Winner	Score	To par	Margin of victory	Runner(s)-up	Winner's share ($)
Michelob Championship at Kingsmill
2002	(United States) Charles Howell III	270	−14	2 strokes	(United States) Scott Hoch (United States) Brandt Jobe	666,000
2001	(United States) David Toms (2)	269	−15	1 stroke	(United States) Kirk Triplett	630,000
2000	(United States) David Toms	271	−13	Playoff	(Canada) Mike Weir	540,000
1999	(United States) Notah Begay III	274	−10	Playoff	(United States) Tom Byrum	450,000
1998	(United States) David Duval (2)	268	−16	3 strokes	(New Zealand) Phil Tataurangi	342,000
1997	(United States) David Duval	271	−13	Playoff	(New Zealand) Grant Waite (United States) Duffy Waldorf	279,000
1996	(United States) Scott Hoch	265	−19	4 strokes	(United States) Tom Purtzer	225,000
Anheuser-Busch Golf Classic
1995	(United States) Ted Tryba	271	−12	1 stroke	(United States) Scott Simpson	198,000
1994	(United States) Mark McCumber (2)	267	−17	3 strokes	(United States) Glen Day	198,000
1993	(United States) Jim Gallagher Jr.	269	−15	2 strokes	(United States) Chip Beck	198,000
1992	(United States) David Peoples	271	−13	1 stroke	(United States) Bill Britton (United States) Ed Dougherty (United States) Jim Gallagher Jr.	198,000
1991	(United States) Mike Hulbert	266	−18	Playoff	(United States) Kenny Knox	180,000
1990	(United States) Lanny Wadkins	266	−18	5 strokes	(United States) Larry Mize	180,000
1989	(United States) Mike Donald	268	−16	Playoff	(United States) Tim Simpson (United States) Hal Sutton	153,000
1988	(United States) Tom Sieckmann	270	−14	Playoff	(United States) Mark Wiebe	117,000
1987	(United States) Mark McCumber	267	−17	1 stroke	(United States) Bobby Clampett	110,160
1986	(United States) Fuzzy Zoeller	274	−10	2 strokes	(United States) Jodie Mudd	90,000
1985	(United States) Mark Wiebe	273	−11	Playoff	(United States) John Mahaffey	90,000
1984	(United States) Ronnie Black	267	−17	1 stroke	(United States) Willie Wood	63,000
1983	(United States) Calvin Peete (2)	276	−8	1 stroke	(United States) Tim Norris	63,000
1982	(United States) Calvin Peete	203	−10	2 strokes	(United States) Bruce Lietzke	63,000
1981	(United States) John Mahaffey	276	−8	2 strokes	(United States) Andy North	54,000
1980	(United States) Ben Crenshaw	272	−16	4 strokes	(United States) Jack Renner	54,000
1979	(United States) John Fought	273	−15	1 stroke	(United States) Buddy Gardner (United States) Alan Tapie (United States) Bobby Wadkins	54,000
1978	(United States) Tom Watson	270	−18	3 strokes	(United States) Ed Sneed	40,000
1977	(United States) Miller Barber (2)	272	−16	2 strokes	(United States) George Archer	40,000
Kaiser International Open Invitational
1976	(United States) J. C. Snead	274	−14	2 strokes	(United States) Gibby Gilbert (United States) Johnny Miller	35,000
1975	(United States) Johnny Miller (2)	272	−16	3 strokes	(United States) Rod Curl	35,000
1974	(United States) Johnny Miller	271	−17	8 strokes	(United States) Billy Casper (United States) Lee Trevino	30,000
1973	(United States) Ed Sneed	275	−13	Playoff	(United States) John Schlee	30,092
1972	(Canada) George Knudson	271	−17	3 strokes	(United States) Hale Irwin (United States) Bobby Nichols	30,000
1971	(United States) Billy Casper	269	−19	4 strokes	(United States) Fred Marti	30,000
1970	(United States) Ken Still	278	−10	Playoff	(United States) Lee Trevino (United States) Bert Yancey	30,000
1969 (Nov)	(United States) Jack Nicklaus	273	−15	Playoff	(United States) George Archer (United States) Billy Casper (United States) Don January	28,000
1969 (Jan)	(United States) Miller Barber	135 (Note: Shortened to 36 holes due to weather.)	−9	1 stroke	(Australia) Bruce Devlin	13,500
1968	(United States) Kermit Zarley	273	−15	1 stroke	(United States) Dave Marr	25,000
