= 1983 PGA Tour Qualifying School graduates =

This is a list of the 1983 PGA Tour Qualifying School graduates. 57 players earned their 1984 PGA Tour card through Q-School in 1983. The tournament was played over 108 holes at the Tournament Players Club in Ponte Vedra, Florida.

== Tournament summary ==
A couple of future big names were unsuccessful at the tournament. Corey Pavin was "an unexpected failure" failing to move past the regional qualifying section. In the finals, Bob Tway shot a closing 81, including a three-putt on the final green to miss earning a card by a stroke.

== List of graduates ==
Place	Player	Notes
1	(United States) Willie Wood	
2	(United States) Brett Upper	
T3	(United States) Bill Britton	
T3	(United States) Griff Moody	
T3	(United States) Joey Sindelar	
6	(United States) Jay Cudd	
T7	(United States) Mark Brooks	
T7	(United States) Jodie Mudd	Winner of 1980 and 1981 U.S. Amateur Public Links
T7	(United States) Corey Pavin	1 Southern African Tour win, 1 European Tour win
T7	(United States) Bill Sander	
11	(United States) Tom Lehman	
12	(United States) Steve Liebler	
T13	(United States) Brad Faxon	
T13	(United States) David Peoples	
T13	(United States) Michael Putnam	
T16	(United States) Jim Kane	
T16	(United States) Kenny Knox	
T16	(United States) Loren Roberts	
T16	(United States) Scott Watkins	
T20	(United States) Adam Adams	
T20	(Scotland) Ken Brown	2 European Tour wins
T20	(United States) Gary Krueger	
T20	(United States) Clyde Rego	
T24	(United States) Curt Byrum	
T24	(United States) Ken Kelley	
T24	(United States) Mike Smith	
T24	(United States) Randy Watkins	
T28	(United States) Jim Gallagher Jr.	
T28	(United States) Tom Lamore	
T28	(Taiwan) K.C. Liao	
T28	(United States) Gary Marlowe	
T28	(United States) Tommy Valentine	Runner-up at 1981 Atlanta Classic
T28	(United States) Mark Wiebe	
T34	(United States) Paul Azinger	
T34	(United States) Rick Dalpos	
T34	(United States) Bill Glasson	
T34	(United States) John Hamarik	
T34	(United States) Lyn Lott	Three 3rd-place finishes on PGA Tour
T39	(United States) James Blair	
T39	(United States) Mark Calcavecchia	
T39	(United States) Mike Cunning	
T39	(United States) Greg Farrow	
T39	(United States) Jack Ferenz	
T39	(United States) Frank Fuhrer	
T39	(United States) Larry Rinker	
T39	(United States) Gene Sauers	
T39	(United States) Mick Soli	
T39	(United States) Jack Sprandlin	
T39	(United States) Bobby Stroble	
T50	(United States) Kurt Cox	3 Asia Golf Circuit wins
T50	(United States) Mike Gove	
T50	(United States) Grier Jones	3 PGA Tour wins
T50	(South Africa) Gavan Levenson	1 European Tour win, 1 Sunshine Tour win
T50	(United States) David O'Kelley	
T50	(United States) Mike Peck	
T50	(United States) Gary Pinns	
T50	(United States) Lee Rinker	
