= 1986 PGA Championship =

Coordinates: 41.652°N 83.651°W

Tournament information
- Dates: August 7–11, 1986
- Location: Toledo, Ohio
- Course(s): Inverness Club
- Organized by: PGA of America
- Tour(s): PGA Tour

Statistics
- Par: 71
- Length: 6,982 yards (6,384 m)
- Field: 150 players, 72 after cut
- Cut: 146 (+4)
- Prize fund: $800,000
- Winner's share: $140,000

Champion
- (United States) Bob Tway
- 276 (−8)

Location in the United States
Location in Ohio

The 1986 PGA Championship was the 68th PGA Championship, held August 7–11 at Inverness Club in Toledo, Ohio. Bob Tway won his only major championship, two strokes ahead of runner-up Greg Norman, the 54-hole leader.

Heavy rains on Sunday stopped play for the day in mid-afternoon. In the final group, Norman and Tway completed just one hole of their final round and resumed play on Monday afternoon.

Norman started the round with a four-shot lead and held that margin through the front nine. After a double bogey at 11 and a bogey at 14, the two were tied. They halved the next three holes at par and were tied at the 72nd tee. Tway put his approach shot in a greenside bunker, while Norman was just off the green on the fringe, 25 feet (8 m) out. Tway improbably holed out for birdie and Norman's attempt to tie missed, as did his par-saving putt. Norman led all four majors in 1986 after the third round, but won only the Open.

Entering the championship, Norman was the leading money winner on the PGA Tour in 1986, with Tway in second place.

This was the fifth major championship at Inverness, which hosted the U.S. Open in 1920, 1931, 1957, and 1979, and was the first in which the winning score was under-par; the previous best was even-par in 1979 by Hale Irwin. The PGA Championship returned in 1993.

== Course layout ==
Hole	1	2	3	4	5	6	7	8	9	Out	10	11	12	13	14	15	16	17	18	In	Total
Yards	398	385	190	466	401	211	452	528	420	3,451	363	378	162	523	448	458	409	431	354	3,531	6,982
Par	4	4	3	4	4	3	4	5	4	35	4	4	3	5	4	4	4	4	4	36	71

Lengths of the course for previous major championships:

- 6,982 yards (6,384 m), par 71 - 1979 U.S. Open
- 6,919 yards (6,327 m), par 71 - 1957 U.S. Open
- 6,529 yards (5,970 m), par 71 - 1931 U.S. Open
- 6,569 yards (6,007 m), par 71 - 1920 U.S. Open

== Round summaries ==
=== First round ===
Thursday, August 7, 1986

Place	Player	Score	To par
1	(Australia) Greg Norman	65	−6
T2	(United States) Phil Blackmar	67	−4
T2	(United States) Craig Stadler	67	−4
T4	(United States) Ronnie Black	68	−3
T4	(Australia) Wayne Grady	68	−3
T4	(United States) Peter Jacobsen	68	−3
T4	(United States) Gary Koch	68	−3
T4	(United States) Wayne Levi	68	−3
T9	(United States) Fred Couples	69	−2
T9	(United States) Bob Gilder	69	−2
T9	(United States) Jay Haas	69	−2
T9	(United States) Mike Hulbert	69	−2
T9	(United States) Bruce Lietzke	69	−2
T9	(United States) Larry Mize	69	−2
T9	(United States) Gene Sauers	69	−2
T9	(United States) Bobby Wadkins	69	−2

=== Second round ===
Friday, August 8, 1986

Place	Player	Score	To par
1	(Australia) Greg Norman	65-68=133	−9
T2	(United States) Mike Hulbert	69-68=137	−5
T2	(United States) Payne Stewart	70-67=137	−5
T3	(United States) Peter Jacobsen	68-70=138	−4
T3	(United States) Jack Nicklaus	70-68=138	−4
T3	(United States) Jim Thorpe	71-67=138	−4
6	(United States) Ronnie Black	68-71=139	−3
T7	(United States) Phil Blackmar	67-73=140	−2
T7	(United States) Bruce Lietzke	69-71=140	−2
T7	(United States) Scott Simpson	70-70=140	−2

=== Third round ===
Saturday, August 9, 1986

Place	Player	Score	To par
1	(Australia) Greg Norman	65-68-69=202	−11
2	(United States) Bob Tway	72-70-64=206	−7
3	(United States) Peter Jacobsen	68-70-70=208	−5
T4	(United States) Donnie Hammond	70-71-68=209	−4
T4	(United States) Payne Stewart	70-67-72=209	−4
T6	(United States) Bruce Lietzke	69-71-70=210	−3
T6	(United States) Jack Nicklaus	70-68-72=210	−3
T8	(South Africa) David Frost	70-73-68=211	−2
T8	(United States) Mike Hulbert	69-68-74=211	−2
T8	(United States) Jim Thorpe	71-67-73=211	−2
T8	(United States) D. A. Weibring	71-72-68=211	−2

=== Final round ===
Sunday, August 10, 1986
Monday, August 11, 1986

Place	Player	Score	To par	Money ($)
1	(United States) Bob Tway	72-70-64-70=276	−8	140,000
2	(Australia) Greg Norman	65-68-69-76=278	−6	80,000
3	(United States) Peter Jacobsen	68-70-70-71=279	−5	60,000
4	(United States) D. A. Weibring	71-72-68-69=280	−4	42,865
T5	(United States) Bruce Lietzke	69-71-70-71=281	−3	32,500
T5	(United States) Payne Stewart	70-67-72-72=281	−3	32,500
T7	(Australia) David Graham	75-69-71-67=282	−2	20,833
T7	(United States) Mike Hulbert	69-68-74-71=282	−2	20,833
T7	(United States) Jim Thorpe	71-67-73-71=282	−2	20,833
10	(United States) Doug Tewell	73-71-68-71=283	−1	15,000

=== Scorecard ===
Birdie	Bogey	Double bogey

Final round

Hole	1	2	3	4	5	6	7	8	9	10	11	12	13	14	15	16	17	18
Par	4	4	3	4	4	3	4	5	4	4	4	3	5	4	4	4	4	4
(United States) Tway	−7	−7	−8	−8	−8	−8	−7	−7	−6	−6	−6	−6	−7	−7	−7	−7	−7	−8
(Australia) Norman	−11	−11	−10	−10	−10	−10	−9	−9	−10	−10	−8	−8	−8	−7	−7	−7	−7	−6

Cumulative tournament scores, relative to par

== Video ==
- YouTube – Bob Tway wins the 1986 PGA Championship
