= 1983 Masters Tournament =

- Front cover of the 1983 Masters Guide

Tournament information
- Dates: April 7–11, 1983
- Location: Augusta, Georgia; 33.503°N 82.020°W
- Course: Augusta National Golf Club
- Organized by: Augusta National Golf Club
- Tour: PGA Tour

Statistics
- Par: 72
- Length: 6,905 yards (6,314 m)
- Field: 82 players, 49 after cut
- Cut: 147 (+3)
- Prize fund: $500,000
- Winner's share: $90,000

Champion
- (Spain) Seve Ballesteros
- 280 (−8)
- Location in the United States Location in Georgia

The 1983 Masters Tournament was the 47th Masters Tournament, held April 7–11 at Augusta National Golf Club in Augusta, Georgia. Seve Ballesteros won his second Masters and third major title, four strokes ahead of runners-up Ben Crenshaw and Tom Kite. Play on Friday was postponed due to heavy rain, and the final round was completed on Monday for the first time since 1973.

Defending champion Craig Stadler was tied for the 54-hole lead with 1976 champion Raymond Floyd, with Ballesteros one stroke back, and two-time champion Tom Watson an additional stroke behind. Ballesteros got off to a fast start in the final round on Monday with a birdie-eagle start. With another birdie at the difficult par-3 fourth, he added four pars and another birdie at the ninth for a five-under 31 on the front nine. Ballesteros cruised to a 69 (−3) and a comfortable win as neither Stadler, Floyd, nor Watson broke par.

During the postponement of Friday's round, the possibility was raised that the tournament would not complete the entire 72 holes, as the southeastern U.S. was experiencing heavy rains and flooding and forecasts were not favorable.

Saturday's second round went off from split tees (1st and 10th) and six players did not complete their rounds until early Sunday morning. With this extension, the tournament committee did not attempt to complete the final two rounds on Sunday, opting for the third round only on Sunday and the fourth on Monday.

Four-time champion Arnold Palmer, 53, opened with a 68 on Thursday and made the cut at the Masters for the final time. In his 29th Masters, he stated that the conditions on Saturday were the worst he had ever seen at Augusta. Five-time winner Jack Nicklaus 43, withdrew before his second round start time due to back spasms experienced while warming up. Nicklaus had shot a first round of 73. It was only his second withdrawal as a pro, the first was three years earlier at the 1980 World Series of Golf. Nicklaus had missed only one cut in the previous 23 Masters and made ten consecutive after this year, including his record sixth green jacket in 1986.

As of 2026, it is still the most recent Masters Tournament to have a Monday finish. Due to time constraints with local news/primetime programming, the green jacket ceremony happened before all the players had finished their final rounds, as Stadler and Floyd, the final two golfers on the course, were deemed mathematically too far behind winner Ballesteros for their results to change the outcome of who would win the tournament. Since 1982 champion Stadler was still on the course during the ceremony, Augusta National chairman Hord Hardin placed the green jacket on Ballesteros.

It was the final major championship for Sam Snead, 70, a three-time Masters champion. He withdrew after a first round 79 as he assessed he could not make the cut.

== Caddie policy change ==
This was the first year that players were allowed to use their own caddies, rather than those of Augusta National. Twelve players continued to use caddies from the club, including Nicklaus. The first female caddie at the Masters appeared this year as George Archer, the 1969 champion, employed his 19-year-old daughter Elizabeth. She had carried the bag for her father for twenty previous events since the summer of 1980. Archer finished tied for twelfth, one of his better finishes at Augusta.

== Field ==
1. Masters champions

Tommy Aaron, George Archer, Seve Ballesteros (3,8), Gay Brewer, Billy Casper, Charles Coody, Raymond Floyd (4,8,10,11,12,13), Doug Ford, Bob Goalby, Jack Nicklaus (2,3,4,8,9,11,12,13), Arnold Palmer, Gary Player (8), Sam Snead, Craig Stadler (8,11,12), Art Wall Jr., Tom Watson (2,3,8,9,12,13), Fuzzy Zoeller (8,9,12)

- Jack Burke Jr., Jimmy Demaret, Ralph Guldahl, Claude Harmon, Ben Hogan, Herman Keiser, Cary Middlecoff, Byron Nelson, Henry Picard, and Gene Sarazen did not play.

The following categories only apply to Americans

2. U.S. Open champions (last five years)

Hale Irwin (12,13), Andy North

3. The Open champions (last five years)

Bill Rogers (9,11,12,13)

4. PGA champions (last five years)

John Mahaffey, Larry Nelson (8,12,13)

5. 1982 U.S. Amateur semi-finalists

Rick Fehr (a), Jim Hallet (a), Jay Sigel (6,7,a), David Tolley (a)

6. Previous two U.S. Amateur and Amateur champions

Nathaniel Crosby (7,a)

7. Members of the 1982 U.S. Eisenhower Trophy team

Jim Holtgrieve (a), Bob Lewis (a)

8. Top 24 players and ties from the 1982 Masters Tournament

Andy Bean (12), Ben Crenshaw (13), Danny Edwards (9,12), Bob Gilder (10,11,12), Morris Hatalsky, Mark Hayes, Peter Jacobsen (12), Tom Kite (11,12,13), Wayne Levi (11,12), Bruce Lietzke (11,12,13), Jodie Mudd, Dan Pohl (9), Jack Renner, John Schroeder, Jim Simons (10), Curtis Strange (12), Tom Weiskopf (11,12)

- Jerry Pate (12,13) did not play

9. Top 16 players and ties from the 1982 U.S. Open

Chip Beck, Bobby Clampett (11,12), Jay Haas (10,11,12), Gary Koch (11), Lyn Lott, Calvin Peete (10,11,12), Larry Rinker, Scott Simpson (12), J. C. Snead, Lanny Wadkins (10,11,12)

10. Top eight players and ties from 1982 PGA Championship

Fred Couples

11. Winners of PGA Tour events since the previous Masters

Keith Fergus (12), Gary Hallberg, Scott Hoch (12), Johnny Miller (12,13), Gil Morgan (12), Mike Nicolette, Tim Norris, Ed Sneed (12), Payne Stewart, Hal Sutton (12)

12. Top 30 players from the 1982 PGA Tour money list

George Burns

13. Members of the U.S. 1981 Ryder Cup team

Lee Trevino

14. Foreign invitations

Isao Aoki (11), Bruce Devlin (9), Nick Faldo, David Graham (2,4,8,9), Yutaka Hagawa (8), Hsieh Min-Nan, Sandy Lyle, Tsuneyuki Nakajima, Greg Norman (10), Peter Oosterhuis (8), Philippe Ploujoux (6,a), Bob Shearer (11), Martin Thompson (6,a)

- Numbers in brackets indicate categories that the player would have qualified under had they been American.

== Round summaries ==
=== First round ===
Thursday, April 7, 1983

Place	Player	Score	To par
T1	(United States) Raymond Floyd	67	−5
T1	(United States) Gil Morgan	67	−5
T1	(United States) Jack Renner	67	−5
T4	(Spain) Seve Ballesteros	68	−4
T4	(United States) Charles Coody	68	−4
T4	(United States) Jim Hallet (a)	68	−4
T4	(United States) Arnold Palmer	68	−4
T4	(United States) J. C. Snead	68	−4
T9	(United States) Bruce Lietzke	69	−3
T9	(United States) Craig Stadler	69	−3

=== Second round ===
Saturday, April 9, 1983
Sunday, April 10, 1983

Play on Friday was completely washed out due to rain and the second round started on Saturday;
six players did not finish the second round until Sunday morning.

Place	Player	Score	To par
1	(United States) Gil Morgan	67-70=137	−7
2	(Spain) Seve Ballesteros	68-70=138	−6
T3	(United States) Keith Fergus	70-69=139	−5
T3	(United States) Raymond Floyd	67-72=139	−5
T5	(England) Nick Faldo	70-70=140	−4
T5	(United States) Jodie Mudd	72-68=140	−4
T7	(United States) Fred Couples	73-68=141	−3
T7	(United States) Craig Stadler	69-72=141	−3
T7	(United States) Tom Watson	70-71=141	−3
T10	(United States) Jay Haas	73-69=142	−2
T10	(United States) Gary Hallberg	71-71=142	−2
T10	(United States) Tom Kite	70-72=142	−2
T10	(United States) Wayne Levi	72-70=142	−2
T10	(Japan) Tsuneyuki Nakajima	72-70=142	−2
T10	(England) Peter Oosterhuis	73-69=142	−2
T10	(United States) Arnold Palmer	68-74=142	−2
T10	(United States) Jack Renner	67-75=142	−2
T10	(United States) J. C. Snead	68-74=142	−2

=== Third round ===
Sunday, April 10, 1983

Place	Player	Score	To par
T1	(United States) Raymond Floyd	67-72-71=210	−6
T1	(United States) Craig Stadler	69-72-69=210	−6
3	(Spain) Seve Ballesteros	68-70-73=211	−5
T4	(United States) Jodie Mudd	72-68-72=212	−4
T4	(United States) Tom Watson	70-71-71=212	−4
T6	(United States) Keith Fergus	70-69-74=213	−3
T6	(United States) Gil Morgan	67-70-76=213	−3
8	(Japan) Tsuneyuki Nakajima	72-70-72=214	−2
T9	(United States) George Archer	71-73-71=215	−1
T9	(United States) Jay Haas	73-69-73=215	−1
T9	(United States) Tom Kite	70-72-73=215	−1
T9	(United States) Johnny Miller	72-72-71=215	−1
T9	(Australia) Greg Norman	71-74-70=215	−1
T9	(United States) Scott Simpson	70-73-72=215	−1
T9	(United States) Lee Trevino	71-72-72=215	−1

=== Final round ===
Monday, April 11, 1983

==== Final leaderboard ====
Champion
Silver Cup winner (low amateur)
(a) = amateur
(c) = past champion

Top 10
Place	Player	Score	To par	Money (US$)
1	(Spain) Seve Ballesteros (c)	68-70-73-69=280	−8	90,000
T2	(United States) Ben Crenshaw	76-70-70-68=284	−4	44,000
T2	(United States) Tom Kite	70-72-73-69=284	−4	44,000
T4	(United States) Raymond Floyd (c)	67-72-71-75=285	−3	22,000
T4	(United States) Tom Watson (c)	70-71-71-73=285	−3	22,000
T6	(United States) Hale Irwin	72-73-72-69=286	−2	17,400
T6	(United States) Craig Stadler (c)	69-72-69-76=286	−2	17,400
T8	(United States) Gil Morgan	67-70-76-74=287	−1	14,500
T8	(United States) Dan Pohl	74-72-70-71=287	−1	14,500
T8	(United States) Lanny Wadkins	73-70-73-71=287	−1	14,500

Leaderboard below the top 10
Place	Player	Score	To par	Money ($)
11	(United States) Scott Simpson	70-73-72-73=288	E	12,500
T12	(United States) George Archer (c)	71-73-71-74=289	+1	10,125
T12	(United States) Wayne Levi	72-70-74-73=289	+1	10,125
T12	(United States) Johnny Miller	72-72-71-74=289	+1	10,125
T12	(United States) J. C. Snead	68-74-74-73=289	+1	10,125
T16	(United States) Keith Fergus	70-69-74-77=290	+2	8,000
T16	(Japan) Tsuneyuki Nakajima	72-70-72-76=290	+2	8,000
T16	(United States) Jack Renner	67-75-78-70=290	+2	8,000
19	(Japan) Isao Aoki	70-76-74-71=291	+3	7,000
T20	(England) Nick Faldo	70-70-76-76=292	+4	5,214
T20	(United States) Mark Hayes	71-73-76-72=292	+4	5,214
T20	(United States) Peter Jacobsen	73-71-76-72=292	+4	5,214
T20	(England) Peter Oosterhuis	73-69-78-72=292	+4	5,214
T20	(United States) Lee Trevino	71-72-72-77=292	+4	5,214
T20	(United States) Tom Weiskopf	75-72-71-74=292	+4	5,214
T20	(United States) Fuzzy Zoeller (c)	70-74-76-72=292	+4	5,214
T27	(United States) Jay Haas	73-69-73-78=293	+5	3,667
T27	(United States) Scott Hoch	74-69-74-76=293	+5	3,667
T27	(United States) Hal Sutton	73-73-70-77=293	+5	3,667
T30	(Australia) Greg Norman	71-74-70-79=294	+6	3,350
T30	(United States) Andy North	72-75-72-75=294	+6	3,350
T32	(United States) Chip Beck	71-76-76-72=295	+7	2,900
T32	(United States) Fred Couples	73-68-81-73=295	+7	2,900
T32	(United States) Gary Hallberg	71-71-75-78=295	+7	2,900
T32	(United States) Payne Stewart	70-76-78-71=295	+7	2,900
T36	(United States) Charles Coody (c)	68-75-79-74=296	+8	2,450
T36	(United States) Danny Edwards	70-76-79-71=296	+8	2,450
T36	(Japan) Yutaka Hagawa	72-75-75-74=296	+8	2,450
T36	(United States) Arnold Palmer (c)	68-74-76-78=296	+8	2,450
T40	(United States) Jim Hallet (a)	68-73-78-78=297	+9	0
T40	(United States) John Mahaffey	72-75-74-76=297	+9	2,200
T42	(United States) Bruce Lietzke	69-75-82-72=298	+10	2,050
T42	(United States) Jodie Mudd	72-68-72-86=298	+10	2,050
T44	(United States) Bob Gilder	72-74-76-77=299	+11	1,970
T44	(United States) Mike Nicolette	73-74-78-74=299	+11	1,970
46	(Australia) David Graham	71-74-80-75=300	+12	1,940
47	(United States) Gay Brewer (c)	72-73-80-76=301	+13	1,920
48	(Australia) Bob Shearer	70-77-82-76=305	+17	1,900
49	(United States) Calvin Peete	70-72-87-80=309	+21	1,880
CUT	(United States) Billy Casper (c)	72-76=148	+4	
CUT	(United States) Rick Fehr (a)	74-74=148	+4	
CUT	(United States) Lyn Lott	77-71=148	+4	
CUT	(Scotland) Sandy Lyle	74-74=148	+4	
CUT	(United States) Larry Nelson	73-75=148	+4	
CUT	(United States) Ed Sneed	74-74=148	+4	
CUT	(United States) Bobby Clampett	74-75=149	+5	
CUT	(United States) Curtis Strange	77-72=149	+5	
CUT	(United States) George Burns	77-73=150	+6	
CUT	(Australia) Bruce Devlin	73-77=150	+6	
CUT	(United States) Tim Norris	75-75=150	+6	
CUT	(United States) Bill Rogers	72-78=150	+6	
CUT	(United States) Tommy Aaron (c)	76-75=151	+7	
CUT	(United States) Morris Hatalsky	77-74=151	+7	
CUT	(South Africa) Gary Player (c)	73-78=151	+7	
CUT	(United States) Jim Simons	74-77=151	+7	
CUT	(United States) David Tolley (a)	77-74=151	+7	
CUT	(United States) Andy Bean	76-76=152	+8	
CUT	(Taiwan) Hsieh Min-Nan	74-78=152	+8	
CUT	(England) Martin Thompson (a)	76-76=152	+8	
CUT	(United States) Gary Koch	76-77=153	+9	
CUT	(United States) Bob Lewis (a)	74-79=153	+9	
CUT	(United States) Jay Sigel (a)	72-81=153	+9	
CUT	(United States) Bob Goalby (c)	76-79=155	+11	
CUT	(United States) Larry Rinker	75-81=156	+12	
CUT	(United States) Jim Holtgrieve (a)	78-80=158	+14	
CUT	(United States) John Schroeder	79-79=158	+14	
CUT	(United States) Art Wall Jr. (c)	74-84=158	+14	
CUT	(United States) Nathaniel Crosby (a)	79-81=160	+16	
CUT	(France) Philippe Ploujoux (a)	81-84=165	+21	
WD	(United States) Jack Nicklaus (c)	73	+1	
WD	(United States) Sam Snead (c)	79	+7	
WD	(United States) Doug Ford (c)	85	+13	

==== Scorecard ====
Hole	1	2	3	4	5	6	7	8	9	10	11	12	13	14	15	16	17	18
Par	4	5	4	3	4	3	4	5	4	4	4	3	5	4	5	3	4	4
(Spain) Ballesteros	−6	−8	−8	−9	−9	−9	−9	−9	−10	−9	−9	−8	−8	−8	−8	−8	−8	−8
(United States) Crenshaw	E	−1	−2	−2	−2	−1	−2	−2	−2	−2	−2	−2	−4	−4	−4	−4	−4	−4
(United States) Kite	−1	−2	−1	−1	E	E	E	E	E	E	E	−1	−2	−3	−3	−2	−3	−4
(United States) Floyd	−6	−6	−6	−6	−5	−4	−4	−4	−4	−3	−3	−3	−3	−3	−3	-3	−4	−3
(United States) Watson	−4	−5	−5	−5	−6	−6	−5	−7	−6	−5	−4	−4	−5	−3	−3	−3	−3	−3
(United States) Stadler	−5	−6	−6	−6	−6	−5	−6	−6	−6	−6	−5	−4	−4	−3	−2	−2	−2	−2
(United States) Irwin	+1	E	−1	−1	−1	−1	−1	−1	E	E	E	E	E	−1	−1	−2	−2	−2

Cumulative tournament scores, relative to par
