= Southern Open =

Golf tournament formerly on the PGA Tour

Buick Challenge
Tournament information
- Location: Pine Mountain, Georgia
- Established: 1970
- Course: Callaway Gardens Resort
- Par: 72
- Length: 7,057 yards (6,453 m)
- Tour: PGA Tour
- Format: Stroke play
- Prize fund: US$3,700,000
- Month played: October
- Final year: 2002

Tournament record score
- Aggregate: 261 Jonathan Byrd (2002)
- To par: −27 as above

Final champion
- (United States) Jonathan Byrd
- Location in the United States Location in Georgia

The Southern Open was a golf tournament on the PGA Tour from 1970 to 2002. It was played at the Green Island Country Club in Columbus, Georgia, from 1970 to 1990 and at the Callaway Gardens Resort (Mountain View Course), Pine Mountain, Georgia, from 1991 to 2002. It was founded in 1970 as the Green Island Open Invitational but was known for most of its existence as the Southern Open. The purse for the 2002 tournament was $3,700,000, with $666,000 going to the winner.

== Tournament highlights ==
- 1970: Mason Rudolph wins the inaugural version of the tournament. He finishes two shots ahead of Chris Blocker.
- 1971: Future World Golf Hall of Fame member Johnny Miller wins for the first time on the PGA Tour. He wins by five shots over Deane Beman.
- 1975: Hubert Green shoots a final round 64 to win by three shots over John Schroeder.
- 1978: Jerry Pate becomes the one and only winner of the tournament to successfully defend his title. He beats Phil Hancock by one shot.
- 1981: Mike Sullivan looks poised to win back to back Southern Opens till J. C. Snead defeats him on the second hole of a sudden death playoff.
- 1983: Scottish golfer Sam Torrance who had never made a cut in ten previous PGA Tour appearances, tries tuning up for the Ryder Cup matches by participating in the Southern Open. Torrance nearly wins till Ronnie Black birdies the fourth playoff hole to take home the title.
- 1986: Columbus, Georgia native and Monday qualifier Fred Wadsworth wins by two shots over George Archer, John Cook, Tim Simpson, and Jim Thorpe.
- 1990: Kenny Knox who was born in Columbus, Georgia and had lived there till he was sixteen, makes a birdie on the second playoff hole to defeat Jim Hallet.
- 1993: The tournament has its first ever five-player playoff. John Inman makes a birdie on the second extra hole to defeat Billy Andrade, Bob Estes, Brad Bryant, and Mark Brooks.
- 1996: For the second time in four years, the tournament winner is decided in a five-player playoff. Michael Bradley birdies the first hole of sudden death to beat defending champion Fred Funk, Len Mattiace, Davis Love III, and John Maginnes.
- 2001: Just like in 1981 and 1996, the defending champion loses in a playoff. This time it is David Duval who loses to Chris DiMarco on the first hole of sudden death.
- 2002: Jonathan Byrd shoots a final round 63 to win the final edition of the tournament. He beats David Toms by one shot.

== Winners ==
Year	Winner	Score	To par	Margin of victory	Runner(s)-up
Buick Challenge
2002	(United States) Jonathan Byrd	261	−27	1 stroke	(United States) David Toms
2001	(United States) Chris DiMarco	267	−21	Playoff	(United States) David Duval
2000	(United States) David Duval	269	−19	2 strokes	(United States) Jeff Maggert (Zimbabwe) Nick Price
1999	(United States) David Toms	271	−17	3 strokes	(Australia) Stuart Appleby
1998	(Australia) Steve Elkington (2)	267	−21	Playoff	(United States) Fred Funk
1997	(United States) Davis Love III	270	−18	4 strokes	(United States) Stewart Cink
1996	(United States) Michael Bradley	134 (Note: Shortened to 36 holes due to weather.)	−10	Playoff	(United States) Fred Funk (United States) Davis Love III (United States) John Maginnes (United States) Len Mattiace
1995	(United States) Fred Funk	272	−16	1 stroke	(United States) John Morse (United States) Loren Roberts
Buick Southern Open
1994	(Australia) Steve Elkington	200 (Note: Shortened to 54 holes due to rain.)	−16	5 strokes	(Australia) Steve Rintoul
1993	(United States) John Inman	278	−10	Playoff	(United States) Billy Andrade (United States) Mark Brooks (United States) Brad Bryant (United States) Bob Estes
1992	(United States) Gary Hallberg	206	−10	1 stroke	(United States) Jim Gallagher Jr.
1991	(United States) David Peoples	276	−12	1 stroke	(United States) Robert Gamez
1990	(United States) Kenny Knox	265	−15	Playoff	(United States) Jim Hallet
Southern Open
1989	(United States) Ted Schulz	266	−14	1 stroke	(United States) Jay Haas (United States) Tim Simpson
1988	(South Africa) David Frost	270	−10	Playoff	(United States) Bob Tway
1987	(Scotland) Ken Brown	266	−14	7 strokes	(South Africa) David Frost (United States) Mike Hulbert (United States) Larry Mize
1986	(United States) Fred Wadsworth	269	−11	2 strokes	(United States) George Archer (United States) John Cook (United States) Tim Simpson (United States) Jim Thorpe
1985	(United States) Tim Simpson	264	−16	2 strokes	(United States) Clarence Rose
1984	(United States) Hubert Green (2)	265	−15	6 strokes	(United States) Rex Caldwell (United States) Scott Hoch (United States) Corey Pavin
1983	(United States) Ronnie Black	271	−9	Playoff	(Scotland) Sam Torrance
1982	(United States) Bobby Clampett	266	−14	2 strokes	(United States) Hale Irwin
1981	(United States) J. C. Snead	271	−9	Playoff	(United States) Mike Sullivan
1980	(United States) Mike Sullivan	269	−11	5 strokes	(United States) Dave Eichelberger (United States) Johnny Miller
1979	(United States) Ed Fiori	274	−6	Playoff	(United States) Tom Weiskopf
1978	(United States) Jerry Pate (2)	269	−11	1 stroke	(United States) Phil Hancock
1977	(United States) Jerry Pate	266	−14	7 strokes	(United States) Phil Hancock (United States) Mac McLendon (United States) Johnny Miller (United States) Steve Taylor
1976	(United States) Mac McLendon	274	−6	2 strokes	(United States) Hubert Green
1975	(United States) Hubert Green	264	−16	3 strokes	(United States) John Schroeder
1974	(United States) Forrest Fezler	271	−9	1 stroke	(Australia) Bruce Crampton (United States) J. C. Snead
1973	(South Africa) Gary Player	270	−10	1 stroke	(United States) Forrest Fezler
1972	(United States) DeWitt Weaver	276	−4	Playoff	(United States) Chuck Courtney
Southern Open Invitational
1971	(United States) Johnny Miller	267	−13	5 strokes	(United States) Deane Beman
Green Island Open Invitational
1970	(United States) Mason Rudolph	274	−6	2 strokes	(United States) Chris Blocker
