= 1990 Masters Tournament =

American golf tournament held in 1990

- Front cover of the 1990 Masters Journal

Tournament information
- Dates: April 5–8, 1990
- Location: Augusta, Georgia; 33.503°N 82.020°W
- Course: Augusta National Golf Club
- Organized by: Augusta National Golf Club
- Tour: PGA Tour

Statistics
- Par: 72
- Length: 6,905 yards (6,314 m)
- Field: 85 players, 49 after cut
- Cut: 148 (+4)
- Prize fund: US$1.25 million
- Winner's share: $225,000

Champion
- (England) Nick Faldo
- 278 (−10), playoff

Location map
- Location in the United States Location in Georgia

The 1990 Masters Tournament was the 54th Masters Tournament, held April 5–8 at Augusta National Golf Club in Augusta, Georgia.

Nick Faldo won his second consecutive Masters and the third of his six major titles on the second sudden-death playoff hole over Raymond Floyd, the 1976 champion. The playoff began on the tenth hole where both made par. At the next hole, #11, Floyd put his 7-iron approach shot into the pond left of the green, while Faldo hit to within 18 feet (5.5 m) of the cup; he lagged his birdie putt to within a few inches and tapped in for the win. It foiled Floyd's attempt to win a major in four different decades. Afterward, he said, "This is the most devastating thing that's ever happened to me in my career. I've had a lot of losses, but nothing like this."

Floyd led after each of the second and third rounds and had earned the reputation of being a good front-runner in his career. A birdie on 12 gave Floyd a four-shot lead with six holes to play. Faldo birdied 13, 15, and 16, and Floyd's bogey on 17 left them tied at 10-under par at the end of 72 holes.

It was the third consecutive year that the Masters champion was from the United Kingdom, which had no winners prior to Sandy Lyle's victory in 1988.

Faldo was the second to win consecutive titles at Augusta, following Jack Nicklaus (1965 and 1966). Faldo's wins came at the second hole of a sudden-death playoff, at the eleventh green. Tiger Woods and Rory Mcilroy later won back-to-back Masters in 2001 and 2002, and 2025 and 2026 respectively. Faldo won his third Masters six years later in 1996, for his sixth and final major title.

Chris Patton was the only amateur to make the cut and tied for 39th place at 296 (+8).

== Field ==
1. Masters champions

Tommy Aaron, George Archer, Seve Ballesteros (3,9), Gay Brewer, Billy Casper, Charles Coody, Ben Crenshaw (9,13), Nick Faldo (3), Raymond Floyd (2), Doug Ford, Bernhard Langer, Sandy Lyle (3), Larry Mize, Jack Nicklaus (9), Arnold Palmer, Gary Player, Craig Stadler (11,13), Tom Watson (9,14), Fuzzy Zoeller

- Jack Burke Jr., Bob Goalby, Ben Hogan, Herman Keiser, Cary Middlecoff, Byron Nelson, Henry Picard, Gene Sarazen, Sam Snead, and Art Wall Jr. did not play.

2. U.S. Open champions (last five years)

Andy North, Scott Simpson (10,12), Curtis Strange (9,11,13,14)

3. The Open champions (last five years)

Mark Calcavecchia (13,14), Greg Norman (9,12,13)

4. PGA champions (last five years)

Hubert Green (10), Larry Nelson (10), Jeff Sluman (9), Payne Stewart (9,10,12,13,14), Bob Tway (12,13)

5. U.S. Amateur champion and runner-up

Danny Green (a), Chris Patton (a)

6. The Amateur champion

Stephen Dodd (a)

7. U.S. Amateur Public Links champion

Tim Hobby (a)

8. U.S. Mid-Amateur champion

James Taylor (a)

9. Top 24 players and ties from the 1989 Masters Tournament

Paul Azinger (10,12,13,14), Chip Beck (10,13,14), Fred Couples (12,13,14), David Frost (12,13), Ken Green (12,14), Scott Hoch (10,11,12,13), Tom Kite (10,12,13,14), Jodie Mudd (12,13), José María Olazábal (10), Mark O'Meara (12,13,14), Masashi Ozaki (10), Don Pooley, Tom Purtzer, Mike Reid (11,13), Lee Trevino, Ian Woosnam (10,11)

10. Top 16 players and ties from the 1989 U.S. Open

Brian Claar, Peter Jacobsen (12), Mark Lye, Mark McCumber (12,13,14), Tom Pernice Jr.

11. Top eight players and ties from 1989 PGA Championship

Andy Bean, Dave Rummells (13)

12. Winners of PGA Tour events since the previous Masters

Tommy Armour III, Ian Baker-Finch, Bill Britton, Curt Byrum, Tom Byrum, Mike Donald (13), Dan Forsman, Robert Gamez, Wayne Grady (13), Donnie Hammond (13), Mike Hulbert (13), John Huston, David Ishii, Steve Jones (13), John Mahaffey (13), Blaine McCallister (13), Ted Schulz (13), Tony Sills, Tim Simpson (13), Leonard Thompson

- Stan Utley, the winner of the Chattanooga Classic was not invited.

13. Top 30 players from the 1989 PGA Tour money list

Bill Glasson, Wayne Levi, Hal Sutton

14. Members of the U.S. 1989 Ryder Cup team

Lanny Wadkins

15. Special foreign invitation

Naomichi Ozaki, Craig Parry, Ronan Rafferty, Peter Senior

== Round summaries ==
=== First round ===
Thursday, April 5, 1990

Place	Player	Score	To par
1	(United States) Mike Donald	64	−8
2	(United States) John Huston	66	−6
3	(United States) Peter Jacobsen	67	−5
4	(United States) Bill Britton	68	−4
T5	(United States) George Archer	70	−2
T5	(United States) Raymond Floyd	70	−2
T5	(United States) Bill Glasson	70	−2
T5	(West Germany) Bernhard Langer	70	−2
T5	(United States) Larry Mize	70	−2
T5	(Japan) Jumbo Ozaki	70	−2
T5	(United States) Curtis Strange	70	−2

=== Second round ===
Friday, April 6, 1990

Place	Player	Score	To par
1	(United States) Raymond Floyd	70-68=138	−6
2	(United States) Scott Hoch	71-68=139	−5
3	(United States) John Huston	66-74=140	−4
4	(Japan) Jumbo Ozaki	70-71=141	−3
T5	(United States) Bill Britton	68-74=142	−2
T5	(United States) Mike Hulbert	71-71=142	−2
T5	(United States) Peter Jacobsen	67-75=142	−2
T5	(United States) Jack Nicklaus	72-70=142	−2
T5	(United States) Craig Stadler	72-70=142	−2
T10	(United States) Fred Couples	74-69=143	−1
T10	(England) Nick Faldo	71-72=143	−1
T10	(West Germany) Bernhard Langer	70-73=143	−1
T10	(United States) Curtis Strange	70-73=143	−1

Amateurs: Patton (E), Dodd (+11), Hobby (+14), Green (+15), Taylor (+17)

=== Third round ===
Saturday, April 7, 1990

Place	Player	Score	To par
1	(United States) Raymond Floyd	70-68-68=206	−10
2	(United States) John Huston	66-74-68=208	−8
3	(England) Nick Faldo	71-72-66=209	−7
4	(United States) Jack Nicklaus	72-70-69=211	−5
T5	(United States) Scott Hoch	71-68-73=212	−4
T5	(West Germany) Bernhard Langer	70-73-69=212	−4
T7	(United States) Bill Britton	68-74-71=213	−3
T7	(Spain) José María Olazábal	72-73-68=213	−3
T7	(United States) Scott Simpson	74-71-68=213	−3
T10	(United States) Tom Kite	75-73-66=214	−2
T10	(United States) Curtis Strange	70-73-71=214	−2

=== Final round ===
Sunday, April 8, 1990

==== Final leaderboard ====
Champion
Silver Cup winner (low amateur)
(a) = amateur
(c) = past champion

Top 10
Place	Player	Score	To par	Money (US$)
T1	(England) Nick Faldo (c)	71-72-66-69=278	−10	Playoff
T1	(United States) Raymond Floyd (c)	70-68-68-72=278	−10	Playoff
T3	(United States) John Huston	66-74-68-75=283	−5	72,500
T3	(United States) Lanny Wadkins	72-73-70-68=283	−5	72,500
5	(United States) Fred Couples	74-69-72-69=284	−4	50,000
6	(United States) Jack Nicklaus (c)	72-70-69-74=285	−3	45,000
T7	(Spain) Seve Ballesteros (c)	74-73-68-71=286	−2	35,150
T7	(United States) Bill Britton	68-74-71-73=286	−2	35,150
T7	(West Germany) Bernhard Langer (c)	70-73-69-74=286	−2	35,150
T7	(United States) Scott Simpson	74-71-68-73=286	−2	35,150
T7	(United States) Curtis Strange	70-73-71-72=286	−2	35,150
T7	(United States) Tom Watson (c)	77-71-67-71=286	−2	35,150

Leaderboard below the top 10
Place	Player	Score	To par	Money ($)
13	(Spain) José María Olazábal	72-73-68-74=287	−1	26,300
T14	(United States) Ben Crenshaw (c)	72-74-73-69=288	E	20,650
T14	(United States) Scott Hoch	71-68-73-76=288	E	20,650
T14	(United States) Tom Kite	75-73-66-74=288	E	20,650
T14	(United States) Larry Mize (c)	70-76-71-71=288	E	20,650
T14	(Northern Ireland) Ronan Rafferty	72-74-69-73=288	E	20,650
T14	(United States) Craig Stadler (c)	72-70-74-72=288	E	20,650
T20	(United States) Mark Calcavecchia	74-73-73-69=289	+1	15,100
T20	(United States) Steve Jones	77-69-72-71=289	+1	15,100
T20	(United States) Fuzzy Zoeller (c)	72-74-73-70=289	+1	15,100
23	(Japan) Masashi Ozaki	70-71-77-72=290	+2	13,000
T24	(United States) Donnie Hammond	71-74-75-71=291	+3	11,000
T24	(South Africa) Gary Player (c)	73-74-68-76=291	+3	11,000
T24	(United States) Lee Trevino	78-69-72-72=291	+3	11,000
T27	(Australia) Wayne Grady	72-75-72-73=292	+4	9,267
T27	(United States) Andy North	71-73-77-71=292	+4	9,267
T27	(United States) Jeff Sluman	78-68-75-71=292	+4	9,267
T30	(United States) Peter Jacobsen	67-75-76-75=293	+5	8,133
T30	(United States) Jodie Mudd	74-70-73-76=293	+5	8,133
T30	(Wales) Ian Woosnam	72-75-70-76=293	+5	8,133
T33	(United States) Andy Bean	76-72-74-72=294	+6	7,100
T33	(United States) Bill Glasson	70-75-76-73=294	+6	7,100
T33	(Japan) Naomichi Ozaki	75-73-74-72=294	+6	7,100
T36	(United States) Mark McCumber	74-74-76-71=295	+7	6,133
T36	(United States) Payne Stewart	71-73-77-74=295	+7	6,133
T36	(United States) Bob Tway	72-76-73-74=295	+7	6,133
T39	(United States) Chip Beck	72-74-75-75=296	+8	5,500
T39	(United States) Mark Lye	75-73-73-75=296	+8	5,500
T39	(United States) Chris Patton (a)	71-73-74-78=296	+8	0
T42	(United States) John Mahaffey	72-74-75-76=297	+9	4,867
T42	(United States) Don Pooley	73-73-72-79=297	+9	4,867
T42	(Australia) Peter Senior	72-75-73-77=297	+9	4,867
T45	(United States) Mike Hulbert	71-71-77-79=298	+10	4,250
T45	(United States) Tom Purtzer	71-77-76-74=298	+10	4,250
47	(United States) Mike Donald	64-82-77-76=299	+11	3,900
48	(United States) Larry Nelson	74-73-79-74=300	+12	3,600
49	(United States) George Archer (c)	70-74-82-75=301	+13	3,400
CUT	(United States) Billy Casper (c)	74-75=149	+5	
CUT	(South Africa) David Frost	74-75=149	+5	
CUT	(United States) Robert Gamez	73-76=149	+5	
CUT	(United States) Mark O'Meara	75-74=149	+5	
CUT	(United States) Mike Reid	76-73=149	+5	
CUT	(United States) Hubert Green	73-77=150	+6	
CUT	(United States) Blaine McCallister	73-77=150	+6	
CUT	(Australia) Greg Norman	78-72=150	+6	
CUT	(United States) Tom Pernice Jr.	74-76=150	+6	
CUT	(United States) Tommy Aaron (c)	77-74=151	+7	
CUT	(Australia) Ian Baker-Finch	77-74=151	+7	
CUT	(United States) Dan Forsman	79-72=151	+7	
CUT	(Scotland) Sandy Lyle (c)	77-74=151	+7	
CUT	(United States) Dave Rummells	77-74=151	+7	
CUT	(United States) Ted Schulz	75-76=151	+7	
CUT	(United States) Tony Sills	77-74=151	+7	
CUT	(United States) Charles Coody (c)	75-77=152	+8	
CUT	(United States) Tim Simpson	77-75=152	+8	
CUT	(United States) Hal Sutton	81-71=152	+8	
CUT	(United States) Tommy Armour III	75-78=153	+9	
CUT	(United States) Gay Brewer (c)	76-77=153	+9	
CUT	(United States) Curt Byrum	76-77=153	+9	
CUT	(United States) Brian Claar	74-79=153	+9	
CUT	(United States) David Ishii	74-79=153	+9	
CUT	(United States) Tom Byrum	77-78=155	+11	
CUT	(Wales) Stephen Dodd (a)	77-78=155	+11	
CUT	(United States) Leonard Thompson	80-75=155	+11	
CUT	(United States) Paul Azinger	80-76=156	+12	
CUT	(United States) Arnold Palmer (c)	76-80=156	+12	
CUT	(Australia) Craig Parry	80-76=156	+12	
CUT	(United States) Ken Green	78-80=158	+14	
CUT	(United States) Tim Hobby (a)	76-82=158	+14	
CUT	(United States) Wayne Levi	77-81=158	+14	
CUT	(United States) Danny Green (a)	79-80=159	+15	
CUT	(United States) James Taylor (a)	83-78=161	+17	
CUT	(United States) Doug Ford (c)	78-85=163	+19	

==== Scorecard ====
Hole	1	2	3	4	5	6	7	8	9	10	11	12	13	14	15	16	17	18
Par	4	5	4	3	4	3	4	5	4	4	4	3	5	4	5	3	4	4
(England) Faldo	−5	−6	−6	−6	−6	−6	−7	−7	−8	−7	−7	−7	−8	−8	−9	−10	−10	−10
(United States) Floyd	−10	−10	−10	−10	−9	−9	−9	−10	−10	−10	−10	−11	−11	−11	−11	−11	−10	−10
(United States) Huston	−7	−6	−6	−6	−5	−5	−4	−4	−4	−2	−2	−2	−2	−2	−3	−4	−5	−5
(United States) Wadkins	−1	−2	−2	−2	−1	−1	−1	−2	−3	−3	−3	−3	−4	−4	−4	−5	−5	−5
(United States) Couples	−1	−2	−2	−2	−2	−2	−2	−3	−3	−3	−4	−4	−4	−4	−6	−5	−4	−4
(United States) Nicklaus	−5	−6	−6	−6	−5	−4	−5	−5	−5	−4	−4	−5	−6	−5	−5	−4	−3	−3

Cumulative tournament scores, relative to par

Eagle	Birdie	Bogey	Double bogey

=== Playoff ===
Place	Player	Score	To par	Money ($)
1	(England) Nick Faldo	4-4	E	225,000
2	(United States) Raymond Floyd	4-x		135,000

- Sudden-death playoff began on hole #10 and ended at hole #11, when Faldo parred.
