= 1990 Open Championship =

Coordinates: 56.343°N 2.803°W

- Front cover of the 1990 Open Program

Tournament information
- Dates: 19–22 July 1990
- Location: St Andrews, Scotland
- Course: Old Course at St Andrews
- Tour(s): European Tour; PGA Tour

Statistics
- Par: 72
- Length: 6,933 yards (6,340 m)
- Field: 156 players, 72 after cut
- Cut: 143 (−1)
- Prize fund: £500,000 $825,000
- Winner's share: £85,000 $153,850

Champion
- (England) Nick Faldo
- 270 (−18)

Location in Scotland
Location in Fife, Scotland

The 1990 Open Championship was a men's major golf championship and the 119th Open Championship, held from 19 to 22 July at the Old Course in St Andrews, Scotland. Nick Faldo won the second of his three Open Championships by five strokes over runners-up Mark McNulty and Payne Stewart. Earlier in the year, Faldo won the Masters; this was the fourth of his six major titles.

== Course ==
Hole	Name	Yards	Par	Hole	Name	Yards	Par
1	Burn	370	4	10	Bobby Jones	342	4
2	Dyke	411	4	11	High (In)	172	3
3	Cartgate (Out)	371	4	12	Heathery (In)	316	4
4	Ginger Beer	463	4	13	Hole O'Cross (In)	425	4
5	Hole O'Cross (Out)	564	5	14	Long	567	5
6	Heathery (Out)	416	4	15	Cartgate (In)	413	4
7	High (Out)	372	4	16	Corner of the Dyke	382	4
8	Short	178	3	17	Road	461	4
9	End	356	4	18	Tom Morris	354	4
Out		3,501	36	In		3,432	36
Source:				Total		6,933	72

Previous lengths of the course for The Open Championship (since 1950):

- 6,933 yards (6,340 m) - 1984, 1978
- 6,957 yards (6,361 m) - 1970
- 6,926 yards (6,333 m) - 1964
- 6,936 yards (6,342 m) - 1960, 1955

== Round summaries ==
=== First round ===
Thursday, 19 July 1990

Place	Player	Score	To par
T1	(United States) Michael Allen	66	−6
T1	(Australia) Greg Norman	66	−6
3	(England) Nick Faldo	67	−5
T4	(Australia) Ian Baker-Finch	68	−4
T4	(United States) Peter Jacobsen	68	−4
T4	(Republic of Ireland) Christy O'Connor Jnr	68	−4
T4	(Australia) Craig Parry	68	−4
T4	(England) Martin Poxon	68	−4
T4	(United States) Payne Stewart	68	−4
T4	(Scotland) Sam Torrance	68	−4
T4	(Wales) Ian Woosnam	68	−4

=== Second round ===
Friday, 20 July 1990

Place	Player	Score	To par
T1	(England) Nick Faldo	67-65=132	−12
T1	(Australia) Greg Norman	66-66=132	−12
T3	(Australia) Craig Parry	68-68=136	−8
T3	(United States) Payne Stewart	68-68=136	−8
T5	(Zimbabwe) Nick Price	70-67=137	−7
T5	(United States) Mike Reid	70-67=137	−7
T5	(England) Jamie Spence	72-65=137	−7
T5	(Wales) Ian Woosnam	68-69=137	−7
T9	(United States) Peter Jacobsen	68-70=138	−6
T9	(United States) Jodie Mudd	72-66=138	−6
T9	(Spain) José María Olazábal	71-67=138	−6
T9	(United States) Steve Pate	70-68=138	−6
T9	(Denmark) Anders Sørensen	70-68=138	−6
T9	(Scotland) Sam Torrance	68-70=138	−6

Amateurs: Nash (+1), Kuramoto (+5), Patton (+5), Muntz (+8).

=== Third round ===
Saturday, 21 July 1990

Place	Player	Score	To par
1	(England) Nick Faldo	67-65-67=199	−17
T2	(Australia) Ian Baker-Finch	68-72-64=204	−12
T2	(United States) Payne Stewart	68-68-68=204	−12
4	(Australia) Craig Parry	68-68-69=205	−11
5	(England) Paul Broadhurst	74-69-63=206	−10
T6	(New Zealand) Frank Nobilo	72-67-68=207	−9
T6	(Wales) Ian Woosnam	68-69-70=207	−9
T8	(Argentina) Vicente Fernández	72-67-69=208	−8
T8	(United States) Peter Jacobsen	68-70-70=208	−8
T8	(Australia) Greg Norman	66-66-76=208	−8
T8	(United States) Corey Pavin	71-69-68=208	−8
T8	(Zimbabwe) Nick Price	70-67-71=208	−8
T8	(United States) Tim Simpson	70-69-69=208	−8

=== Final round ===
Sunday, 22 July 1990

Place	Player	Score	To par	Money (£)
1	(England) Nick Faldo	67-65-67-71=270	−18	85,000
T2	(Zimbabwe) Mark McNulty	74-68-68-65=275	−13	60,000
T2	(United States) Payne Stewart	68-68-68-71=275	−13	60,000
T4	(United States) Jodie Mudd	72-66-72-66=276	−12	40,000
T4	(Wales) Ian Woosnam	68-69-70-69=276	−12	40,000
T6	(Australia) Ian Baker-Finch	68-72-64-73=277	−11	28,500
T6	(Australia) Greg Norman	66-66-76-69=277	−11	28,500
T8	(Australia) David Graham	72-71-70-66=279	−9	22,000
T8	(United States) Donnie Hammond	70-71-68-70=279	−9	22,000
T8	(United States) Steve Pate	70-68-72-69=279	−9	22,000
T8	(United States) Corey Pavin	71-69-68-71=279	−9	22,000
