= Kenny Knox =

American professional golfer (born 1956)

Personal information
- Full name: Edward Kenneth Knox
- Nationality: United States
- Born: August 15, 1956 (age 70) Columbus, Georgia, U.S.
- Height: 5 ft 10 in (1.78 m)
- Weight: 185 lb (84 kg; 13.2 st)

Career
- Sport: Golf
- College: Florida State University
- Turned professional: 1978
- Former tours: PGA Tour; Champions Tour
- Professional wins: 3

Number of wins by tour
- PGA Tour: 3

Best results in major championships
- Masters Tournament: T45: 1987
- PGA Championship: 4th: 1991
- U.S. Open: T17: 1987
- The Open Championship: CUT: 1990

Edward Kenneth Knox (born August 15, 1956) is an American professional golfer who has played on the PGA Tour, Nationwide Tour, and the Champions Tour.

== Early life and amateur career ==
In 1956, Knox was born in Columbus, Georgia. He and his brother were introduced to the game of golf by their mother.

Knox attended Florida State University in Tallahassee, Florida where he earned All-American honors as a member of the golf team. He graduated in 1978.

== Professional career ==
In 1978, Knox turned professional. He was successful at Fall 1981 PGA Tour Qualifying School and joined the PGA Tour the following year.

Knox won three events during his career on the PGA Tour. His first win came at the 1986 Honda Classic. He was the first Monday qualifier to win on the PGA Tour and is the only player to win with a round of 80. His second win occurred a year later at the Hardee's Golf Classic and his third came in 1990 at the Buick Southern Open. During this phase of his career, Knox had more than two dozen top-10 finishes and $1.6 million in earnings. His best result in a major was a 4th-place finish at the 1991 PGA Championship. In his forties, he had difficulty maintaining his PGA Tour privileges and had to play some on the Nationwide Tour.

Knox played on the Champions Tour in 2007 and 2008, managing only two top-25 finishes.

Knox is known for his superior putting ability. He once held the PGA Tour record for fewest putts in a tournament (93) set at the 1989 MCI Classic. His weakness is in the tee-to-green ball-striking phase of the game. In 1996, Knox used his understanding of the short game to start TourGreens, an Atlanta-based business that designs and installs tour-quality artificial putting greens. He is also active in golf course design and construction.

== Personal life ==
Knox lives in Tallahassee.

== Amateur wins ==
- 1977 Southeastern Amateur

== Professional wins (3) ==
=== PGA Tour wins (3) ===
No.	Date	Tournament	Winning score	Margin of victory	Runner(s)-up
1	Mar 2, 1986	Honda Classic	−1 (66-71-80-70=287)	1 stroke	(United States) Andy Bean, (United States) John Mahaffey, (United States) Jodie Mudd, (United States) Clarence Rose
2	Jul 19, 1987	Hardee's Golf Classic	−15 (67-66-66-66=265)	1 stroke	(United States) Gil Morgan
3	Sep 30, 1990	Buick Southern Open	−15 (69-62-68-66=265)	Playoff	(United States) Jim Hallet

PGA Tour playoff record (1–1)

No.	Year	Tournament	Opponent	Result
1	1990	Buick Southern Open	(United States) Jim Hallet	Won with birdie on second extra hole
2	1991	Anheuser-Busch Golf Classic	(United States) Mike Hulbert	Lost to par on first extra hole

== Results in major championships ==
Tournament	1982	1983	1984	1985	1986	1987	1988	1989	1990	1991	1992
Masters Tournament					CUT	T45	CUT			CUT	CUT
U.S. Open	T62			CUT	T45	T17					
The Open Championship									CUT		
PGA Championship					CUT	CUT	T9	CUT		4	CUT

Top 10
Did not play

CUT = missed the half-way cut
"T" = tied

== See also ==
- Fall 1981 PGA Tour Qualifying School graduates
- 1983 PGA Tour Qualifying School graduates
- 1984 PGA Tour Qualifying School graduates
