= Jim Hallet =

American professional golfer (born 1960)

Personal information
- Full name: James Oliver Hallet
- Nationality: United States
- Born: March 30, 1960 (age 66) Hyannis, Massachusetts, U.S.
- Height: 6 ft 0 in (1.83 m)
- Weight: 200 lb (91 kg; 14 st)

Career
- Sport: Golf
- College: Bryant College
- Turned professional: 1984
- Former tours: PGA Tour; Asia Golf Circuit; Canadian Tour
- Professional wins: 3

Best results in major championships
- Masters Tournament: T40: 1983
- PGA Championship: T21: 1987
- U.S. Open: T44: 1991
- The Open Championship: CUT: 1987

Achievements and awards
- Asia Golf Circuit Order of Merit winner: 1987

James Oliver Hallet (born March 30, 1960) is an American professional golfer who played on the PGA Tour.

== Early life ==
Hallet was born in Hyannis, Massachusetts. He was raised in South Yarmouth, Massachusetts on Cape Cod. He attended Dennis-Yarmouth Regional High School. He grew up playing golf at Bass River Golf Course in Yarmouth.

== Amateur career ==
Hallet played college golf at Bryant College, where he was a four-time Division II All-American. He was also the goaltender for the Bryant hockey team for some time. He stated later as an adult that he was "an overnight success" and did not play a lot of junior golf. He reached the semi-finals of the 1982 U.S. Amateur which was played in his home state of Massachusetts at The Country Club.

Hallet's good play at the U.S. Amateur qualified him for the 1983 Masters Tournament. He first achieved national media attention with an opening round 68 (−4), one shot back of the lead. He continued to play well on the front nine of the second round and held a share of the lead after 28 holes. He would fall back mightily over the next two days, shooting 78-78 to finish at 297 (+9) in a tie for 40th. He would finish low amateur, however, and be interviewed with champion Seve Ballesteros at the end of the tournament on CBS' telecast.

== Professional career ==
Hallet turned professional in 1984 and participated at PGA Tour Qualifying Tournament that fall but narrowly failed in earning a card. He would narrowly fail the next two seasons as well. His best season during this interim era was in 1987. He finished runner-up in two Asia Golf Circuit events in 1987 and won the circuit's Order of Merit. He also qualified for his first majors as a professional that summer, competing in Open Championship and PGA Championship. His T-21 at the PGA Championship would ultimately be the best major championship performance of his career. Later in the fall Hallet finally secured his PGA Tour card. Competing against roughly "1,000 upper echelon pros" he performed extremely well, finishing runner-up behind John Huston. This circuitous journey to the PGA Tour earned him a full-length profile in The New York Times.

Hallet played full-time on the PGA Tour from 1988 to 1993. He performed solidly on tour his first two years, scoring half a dozen top-10s in total and easily finishing with the top 125 of the money list both years. Hallet was known for his strong work ethic and played nearly every week on tour. In 1990, he had his first chance to win a tournament. In the fall, at the Buick Southern Open, he had a 12-foot putt to defeat his playing partner Kenny Knox but missed. Knox would birdie the second hole of the playoff to defeat him. The next year, at the USF&G Classic in New Orleans, he shot a 65 (−7) in the third round to take a three shot lead entering Sunday. However, he quickly blew his lead over the first six holes until charging back, making four consecutive birdies, and then hitting a 4-iron to 4 feet on the 18th hole for a final birdie to tie. He entered a playoff with Ian Woosnam, then one of the world's best players who would win the Masters and reach #1 in the world within a month. Both players would tie on the first hole before Hallet bogeyed the 2nd, giving Woosnam the win.

The remainder of his PGA Tour career would be much more of a struggle. In 1992 he did not record a top-10 and barely retained his PGA Tour card with a #118 spot on the money list. The 1993 season would be even more of a struggle as he missed the cut in the majority of tournaments he entered and did not finish within the top 150 of the money list. At this stage in his career, wrist injuries hindered his development.

Hallet would never play full-time on tour again. He returned to Cape Cod. In 2008 he joined Bass River Golf Course (where he learned to play golf) and Bayberry Hills Golf Course to work as a teacher. As of May 2019, Hallet still works at Bass River. He has also informally taught the girls' golf team at Dennis-Yarmouth Regional High School.

== Amateur wins ==
- 1982 New England Amateur, Massachusetts Amateur
- 1983 Massachusetts Amateur

== Professional wins (3) ==
=== Canadian Tour wins (1) ===
No.	Date	Tournament	Winning score	Margin of victory	Runner-up
1	Aug 31, 1986	George Williams B.C. Open	−8 (67-68-70=205)	1 stroke	(Canada) Dave Barr

=== Other wins (2) ===
- 1984 Rhode Island Open
- 1985 Massachusetts Open

== Playoff record ==
PGA Tour playoff record (0–2)

No.	Year	Tournament	Opponent	Result
1	1990	Buick Southern Open	(United States) Kenny Knox	Lost to birdie on second extra hole
2	1991	USF&G Classic	(Wales) Ian Woosnam	Lost to par on second extra hole

== Results in major championships ==
Tournament	1983	1984	1985	1986	1987	1988	1989	1990	1991	1992	1993
Masters Tournament	T40 LA										
U.S. Open						61	CUT		T44		CUT
The Open Championship					CUT						
PGA Championship					T21	T68	CUT		T27		

LA = Low amateur

Did not play

CUT = missed the half-way cut
"T" = tied

== See also ==
- 1987 PGA Tour Qualifying School graduates
