= 1986 PGA Tour =

Golf tour season

1986 PGA Tour season
- Duration: January 8, 1986 – November 2, 1986
- Number of official events: 45
- Most wins: (United States) Bob Tway (4)
- Money list: (Australia) Greg Norman
- PGA Player of the Year: (United States) Bob Tway
- Rookie of the Year: (United States) Brian Claar

The 1986 PGA Tour was the 71st season of the PGA Tour, the main professional golf tour in the United States. It was also the 18th season since separating from the PGA of America.

== Schedule ==
The following table lists official events during the 1986 season.

Date	Tournament	Location	Purse (US$)	Winner (Note: The number in parentheses after each winner's name is the number of PGA Tour events they had won up to and including that tournament. This information is only shown for PGA Tour members.)	OWGR points	Notes
Jan 11	MONY Tournament of Champions	California	500,000	(United States) Calvin Peete (11)	52	Winners-only event
Jan 19	Bob Hope Chrysler Classic	California	600,000	(United States) Donnie Hammond (1)	56	Pro-Am
Jan 26	Phoenix Open	Arizona	500,000	(United States) Hal Sutton (6)	56	
Feb 2	AT&T Pebble Beach National Pro-Am	California	600,000	(United States) Fuzzy Zoeller (8)	46	Pro-Am
Feb 9	Shearson Lehman Brothers Andy Williams Open	California	450,000	(United States) Bob Tway (1)	38	
Feb 16	Hawaiian Open	Hawaii	500,000	(United States) Corey Pavin (3)	54	
Feb 23	Los Angeles Open	California	450,000	(United States) Doug Tewell (3)	42	
Mar 2	Honda Classic	Florida	500,000	(United States) Kenny Knox (1)	42	
Mar 9	Doral-Eastern Open	Florida	500,000	(United States) Andy Bean (10)	54	
Mar 16	Hertz Bay Hill Classic	Florida	500,000	(United States) Dan Forsman (2)	46	
Mar 23	USF&G Classic	Louisiana	500,000	(United States) Calvin Peete (12)	56	
Mar 30	Tournament Players Championship	Florida	900,000	(United States) John Mahaffey (9)	68	Special event
Apr 6	Greater Greensboro Open	North Carolina	500,000	(Scotland) Sandy Lyle (2)	46	
Apr 13	Masters Tournament	Georgia	785,000	(United States) Jack Nicklaus (73)	100	Major championship
Apr 13	Deposit Guaranty Golf Classic	Mississippi	200,000	(Canada) Dan Halldorson (n/a)	10	Alternate event (Note: Official money; unofficial win.)
Apr 20	Sea Pines Heritage	South Carolina	450,000	(United States) Fuzzy Zoeller (9)	50	Invitational
Apr 27	Houston Open	Texas	500,000	(United States) Curtis Strange (9)	52	
May 4	Panasonic Las Vegas Invitational	Nevada	1,150,000	(Australia) Greg Norman (3)	54	
May 11	Byron Nelson Golf Classic	Texas	600,000	(United States) Andy Bean (11)	44	
May 18	Colonial National Invitation	Texas	600,000	(United States) Dan Pohl (1)	38	Invitational
May 25	Memorial Tournament	Ohio	577,730	(United States) Hal Sutton (7)	52	Invitational
Jun 1	Kemper Open	Maryland	500,000	(Australia) Greg Norman (4)	40	
Jun 8	Manufacturers Hanover Westchester Classic	New York	600,000	(United States) Bob Tway (2)	40	
Jun 15	U.S. Open	New York	700,000	(United States) Raymond Floyd (20)	100	Major championship
Jun 15	Provident Classic	Tennessee	300,000	(United States) Brad Faxon (n/a)	10	Alternate event
Jun 22	Georgia-Pacific Atlanta Golf Classic	Georgia	500,000	(United States) Bob Tway (3)	44	
Jun 29	Canadian Open	Canada	600,000	(United States) Bob Murphy (5)	40	
Jul 6	Canon Sammy Davis Jr.-Greater Hartford Open	Connecticut	700,000	(United States) Mac O'Grady (1)	42	
Jul 13	Anheuser-Busch Golf Classic	Virginia	500,000	(United States) Fuzzy Zoeller (10)	44	
Jul 20	The Open Championship	Scotland	£600,000	(Australia) Greg Norman (5)	100	Major championship (Note: Unofficial money event at the time, but retrospectively counted as an official win.)
Jul 20	Hardee's Golf Classic	Illinois	400,000	(United States) Mark Wiebe (2)	20	Alternate event
Jul 27	Buick Open	Michigan	500,000	(United States) Ben Crenshaw (11)	40	
Aug 3	Western Open	Illinois	500,000	(United States) Tom Kite (9)	46	
Aug 11	PGA Championship	Ohio	800,000	(United States) Bob Tway (4)	100	Major championship
Aug 17	The International	Colorado	1,000,000	(United States) Ken Green (2)	58	New tournament
Aug 24	NEC World Series of Golf	Ohio	700,000	(United States) Dan Pohl (2)	56	Limited-field event
Aug 31	Federal Express St. Jude Classic	Tennessee	600,000	(United States) Mike Hulbert (1)	42	
Sep 7	B.C. Open	New York	400,000	(United States) Rick Fehr (1)	20	
Sep 14	Bank of Boston Classic	Massachusetts	450,000	(United States) Gene Sauers (1)	42	
Sep 21	Greater Milwaukee Open	Wisconsin	400,000	(United States) Corey Pavin (4)	26	
Sep 28	Southwest Golf Classic	Texas	400,000	(United States) Mark Calcavecchia (1)	22	
Oct 5	Southern Open	Georgia	350,000	(United States) Fred Wadsworth (1)	20	
Oct 12	Pensacola Open	Florida	300,000	(United States) Ernie Gonzalez (1)	12	
Oct 19	Walt Disney World/Oldsmobile Classic	Florida	500,000	(United States) Raymond Floyd (21)	40	
Oct 26	Vantage Championship	Texas	1,000,000	(United States) Ben Crenshaw (12)	38	
Nov 2	Seiko-Tucson Match Play Championship	Arizona	700,000	(United States) Jim Thorpe (3)	40	Limited-field event
Nov 2	Tallahassee Open	Florida	200,000	(United States) Mark Hayes (n/a)	10	Alternate event

=== Unofficial events ===
The following events were sanctioned by the PGA Tour, but did not carry official money, nor were wins official.

Date	Tournament	Location	Purse ($)	Winner(s)	OWGR points	Notes
Jan 5	Bahamas Classic	Bahamas	300,000	(United States) Hale Irwin	n/a	
Sep 1	PGA Grand Slam of Golf	Illinois	n/a	(Australia) Greg Norman	n/a	
Nov 8	Nissan Cup	Japan	800,000	Team Japan	n/a	Team event
Nov 8	Nissan Cup Individual Trophy	Japan	n/a	(Japan) Tsuneyuki Nakajima	n/a	
Nov 16	Isuzu Kapalua International	Hawaii	600,000	(United States) Andy Bean	30	
Nov 30	Skins Game	California	450,000	(United States) Fuzzy Zoeller	n/a	Limited-field event
Dec 7	JCPenney Classic	Florida	650,000	(United States) Juli Inkster and (United States) Tom Purtzer	n/a	Team event
Dec 14	Chrysler Team Championship	Florida	600,000	(United States) Gary Hallberg and (United States) Scott Hoch	n/a	Team event

== Money list ==
The money list was based on prize money won during the season, calculated in U.S. dollars.

Position	Player	Prize money ($)
1	(Australia) Greg Norman	653,296
2	(United States) Bob Tway	652,780
3	(United States) Payne Stewart	535,389
4	(United States) Andy Bean	491,938
5	(United States) Dan Pohl	463,630
6	(United States) Hal Sutton	429,434
7	(United States) Tom Kite	394,164
8	(United States) Ben Crenshaw	388,169
9	(United States) Raymond Floyd	380,508
10	(West Germany) Bernhard Langer	379,800

== Awards ==
Award	Winner	Ref.
PGA Player of the Year	(United States) Bob Tway	
Rookie of the Year	(United States) Brian Claar	
Scoring leader (PGA Tour – Byron Nelson Award)	(United States) Scott Hoch	
Scoring leader (PGA – Vardon Trophy)	(United States) Scott Hoch	

== See also ==
- 1986 Senior PGA Tour
