= Gene Sauers =

American professional golfer (born 1962)

Personal information
- Full name: Gene Craig Sauers
- Nationality: United States
- Born: August 22, 1962 (age 64) Savannah, Georgia, U.S.
- Height: 5 ft 8 in (1.73 m)
- Weight: 150 lb (68 kg; 11 st)

Career
- Sport: Golf
- College: Georgia Southern
- Turned professional: 1984
- Current tour: PGA Tour Champions
- Former tours: PGA Tour; Web.com Tour
- Professional wins: 9
- Highest ranking: 36 (October 4, 1992)

Number of wins by tour
- PGA Tour: 3
- Korn Ferry Tour: 1
- PGA Tour Champions: 1
- European Senior Tour: 1

Best results in major championships
- Masters Tournament: T33: 1987
- PGA Championship: T2: 1992
- U.S. Open: T58: 1985, 1987
- The Open Championship: T52: 1989

Achievements and awards
- PGA Tour Comeback Player of the Year/ Courage Award: 2002, 2016–17

Gene Craig Sauers (born August 22, 1962) is an American professional golfer, currently playing on the PGA Tour Champions. He had three wins on the PGA Tour and overcame a potentially fatal skin condition that kept him off the golf course for five years. He won the U.S. Senior Open in 2016, a senior major championship.

== Early life and amateur career ==
Sauers was born in Savannah, Georgia and started playing golf at the age of nine with his father. He attended Georgia Southern University in Statesboro, Georgia.

== Professional career ==
In 1984, Sauers turned pro. He joined the PGA Tour later in the year. He quickly had success winning the 1986 Bank of Boston Classic and the 1989 Hawaiian Open. He also won the Deposit Guaranty Golf Classic in Mississippi in 1990, opposite the Masters in April, before it was an official money event.

In the early 1990s Sauers finished two tournaments in a tie for first place at the end of regulation: the 1992 Bob Hope Chrysler Classic, which he lost on the fourth extra hole of a playoff to John Cook, and the 1994 St. Jude Classic, which he and Hal Sutton lost to Tour rookie Dicky Pride. During this era, he also recorded his highest finish in a major championship: a tie for second at the 1992 PGA Championship, which he led for the first three rounds.

Sauers lost his tour card in 1995 and had to play primarily on the Nike Tour. He recorded one victory on the Nike Tour at the 1998 Nike South Carolina Classic, and about a dozen top-10 finishes. In late 2002, Sauers won the Air Canada Championship on the PGA Tour. It gave him a two-year exemption. Sauers also received the PGA Comeback Player of the Year award in 2002.

Sauers competed on the PGA Tour until 2005. From 2006 to 2010, he did not compete professionally after an initial misdiagnosis of rheumatoid arthritis turned out to be Stevens–Johnson syndrome, and he was given only a 25-percent chance of survival. Over several months, during which he received multiple skin grafts that left visible scarring, he gradually recovered.

=== Senior career ===
Sauers finally overcame the disease and played a limited Nationwide Tour schedule in 2011 and 2012 before making his Champions Tour debut at the Boeing Classic near Seattle in 2012. He earned two top-10 finishes in 2012 and was also inducted into the Georgia Golf Hall of Fame. Playing a full season in 2013, Sauers was twice a runner-up, including a playoff loss to Esteban Toledo at the Insperity Invitational. He finished nineteenth on the Champions Tour money list.

In the first six months of 2014, Sauers played in eleven events, with six top-25 finishes and a best of T-15 at the Allianz Championship in early February. At the U.S. Senior Open in Oklahoma in July, he was tied with Colin Montgomerie after 72 holes but lost in a three-hole playoff.

Two years later in 2016, Sauers earned his first win as a senior at the U.S. Senior Open in Ohio.

== Awards and honors ==
- In 2002, Sauers also received the PGA Comeback Player of the Year award
- After the 2016-17 season, Sauers received the PGA Tour's Courage Award

== Professional wins (9) ==
=== PGA Tour wins (3) ===
No.	Date	Tournament	Winning score	To par	Margin of victory	Runner-up
1	Sep 14, 1986	Bank of Boston Classic	70-71-64-69=274	−10	Playoff	(United States) Blaine McCallister
2	Feb 12, 1989	Hawaiian Open	65-67-65=197 (Note: Shortened to 54 holes due to weather.)	−19	1 stroke	(United States) David Ogrin
3	Sep 1, 2002	Air Canada Championship	69-65-66-69=269	−15	1 stroke	(United States) Steve Lowery

PGA Tour playoff record (1–3)

No.	Year	Tournament	Opponent(s)	Result
1	1986	Bank of Boston Classic	(United States) Blaine McCallister	Won with birdie on third extra hole
2	1991	KMart Greater Greensboro Open	(United States) Mark Brooks	Lost to par on third extra hole
3	1992	Bob Hope Chrysler Classic	(United States) John Cook, (United States) Rick Fehr, (United States) Tom Kite, (United States) Mark O'Meara	Cook won with eagle on fourth extra hole Fehr eliminated by birdie on second hole Kite and O'Meara eliminated by birdie on first hole
4	1994	Federal Express St. Jude Classic	(United States) Dicky Pride, (United States) Hal Sutton	Pride won with birdie on first extra hole

=== Nike Tour wins (1) ===
No.	Date	Tournament	Winning score	To par	Margin of victory	Runners-up
1	May 3, 1998	Nike South Carolina Classic	70-69-72-69=280	−8	1 stroke	(United States) Craig Kanada, (United States) Sean Murphy

=== Other wins (4) ===
- 1983 Georgia Open
- 1985 Georgia Open
- 1986 Georgia Open
- 1990 Deposit Guaranty Golf Classic

=== PGA Tour Champions wins (1) ===
Legend
Senior major championships (1)
Other PGA Tour Champions (0)

No.	Date	Tournament	Winning score	To par	Margin of victory	Runners-up
1	Aug 15, 2016	U.S. Senior Open	68-69-71-69=277	−3	1 stroke	(Spain) Miguel Ángel Jiménez, (United States) Billy Mayfair

PGA Tour Champions playoff record (0–5)

No.	Year	Tournament	Opponent(s)	Result
1	2013	Insperity Championship	(United States) Mike Goodes, (Mexico) Esteban Toledo	Toledo won with par on third extra hole Sauers eliminated by par on second hole
2	2014	U.S. Senior Open	(Scotland) Colin Montgomerie	Lost three-hole aggregate playoff; Montgomerie: E (5-3-4=12), Sauers: x (5-4-x=x)
3	2017	Mississippi Gulf Resort Classic	(Spain) Miguel Ángel Jiménez	Lost to birdie on first extra hole
4	2017	3M Championship	(United States) Paul Goydos	Lost to birdie on first extra hole
5	2022	ClubCorp Classic	(New Zealand) Steven Alker, (United States) Scott Parel	Parel won with par on first extra hole

== Results in major championships ==
Tournament	1984	1985	1986	1987	1988	1989
Masters Tournament				T33		CUT
U.S. Open	CUT	T58		T58		
The Open Championship						T52
PGA Championship			T30	T24	CUT	T58

Tournament	1990	1991	1992	1993	1994	1995	1996	1997	1998	1999
Masters Tournament				T34						
U.S. Open										
The Open Championship						T88				
PGA Championship	CUT	T63	T2	T22		T44				

Tournament	2000	2001	2002	2003	2004	2005	2006	2007	2008	2009
Masters Tournament										
U.S. Open										
The Open Championship										
PGA Championship				CUT						

Tournament	2010	2011	2012	2013	2014	2015	2016	2017
Masters Tournament								
U.S. Open								CUT
The Open Championship								
PGA Championship								

Top 10
Did not play

CUT = missed the half-way cut
"T" = tied

== Results in The Players Championship ==
Tournament	1985	1986	1987	1988	1989
The Players Championship	CUT	CUT	T32	T16	T55

Tournament	1990	1991	1992	1993	1994	1995	1996	1997	1998	1999
The Players Championship	T29	T9	CUT	CUT	T51	T3	T53			

Tournament	2000	2001	2002	2003	2004
The Players Championship				CUT	CUT

Top 10
Did not play

CUT = missed the halfway cut
"T" indicates a tie for a place

== Results in World Golf Championships ==
Tournament	2003
Match Play	
Championship	
Invitational	85

Did not play

== Senior major championships ==
=== Wins (1) ===
Year	Championship	54 holes	Winning score	Margin	Runners-up
2016	U.S. Senior Open	1 shot deficit	−3 (68-69-71-69=277)	1 stroke	(Spain) Miguel Ángel Jiménez, (United States) Billy Mayfair

=== Results timeline ===
Results not in chronological order

Tournament	2013	2014	2015	2016	2017	2018	2019	2020	2021	2022	2023	2024	2025	2026
Senior PGA Championship	T25	T25	CUT	T14	CUT	T10		NT	T40	T20		T57	CUT	
The Tradition	T15	T25	T3	T12	T10	T2	52	NT	T42	T26				T35
U.S. Senior Open	T35	2	T47	1	CUT	T21	CUT	NT	T17	T4		CUT	CUT	T38
Senior Players Championship	T47	T39	T12		T9	T54	29	T16	T16	T25		T33	T52	
Senior British Open Championship	10			T18	T23	T24		NT						

Win
Top 10
Did not play

CUT = missed the halfway cut
"T" indicates a tie for a place
NT = no tournament due to COVID-19 pandemic

== See also ==
- 1983 PGA Tour Qualifying School graduates
