= David Peoples (golfer) =

American professional golfer (born 1960)

Personal information
- Full name: David Roy Peoples
- Nationality: United States
- Born: January 9, 1960 (age 66) Augusta, Maine, U.S.
- Height: 5 ft 9 in (1.75 m)
- Weight: 170 lb (77 kg; 12 st)

Career
- Sport: Golf
- College: University of Florida
- Turned professional: 1981
- Current tour: Champions Tour
- Former tours: PGA Tour; Nationwide Tour
- Professional wins: 3
- Highest ranking: 54 (August 30, 1992)

Number of wins by tour
- PGA Tour: 2
- Other: 1

Best results in major championships
- Masters Tournament: T52: 1993
- PGA Championship: T57: 1990
- U.S. Open: T66: 2001
- The Open Championship: DNP

David Roy Peoples (born January 9, 1960) is an American professional golfer who has played on the PGA Tour and Nationwide Tour.

== Career ==
Peoples was born in Augusta, Maine. He accepted an athletic scholarship to attend the University of Florida in Gainesville, Florida, where he played for coach John Darr and Coach Lynn Blevins' Florida Gators men's golf team in National Collegiate Athletic Association (NCAA) competition in 1980 and 1981.

In 1981, Peoples turned professional. He had two PGA Tour victories, and his highest position on the year-end money list was 25th in 1992.

== Professional wins (3) ==
=== PGA Tour wins (2) ===
No.	Date	Tournament	Winning score	Margin of victory	Runner(s)-up
1	Sep 29, 1991	Buick Southern Open	−12 (67-71-72-66=276)	1 stroke	(United States) Robert Gamez
2	Jul 12, 1992	Anheuser-Busch Golf Classic	−13 (66-69-67-69=271)	1 stroke	(United States) Bill Britton, (United States) Ed Dougherty, (United States) Jim Gallagher Jr.

=== Other wins (1) ===
No.	Date	Tournament	Winning score	Margin of victory	Runner-up
1	Nov 11, 1990	Isuzu Kapalua International	−20 (63-69-66-66=264)	5 strokes	(United States) Davis Love III

== Results in major championships ==
Tournament	1990	1991	1992	1993	1994	1995	1996	1997	1998	1999	2000	2001	2002
Masters Tournament			T54	T52									
U.S. Open				CUT								T66	
PGA Championship	T57	T70	T69										CUT

Note: Peoples never played in The Open Championship.

Did not play

CUT = missed the half-way cut
"T" = tied

== See also ==
- 1982 PGA Tour Qualifying School graduates
- 1983 PGA Tour Qualifying School graduates
- 1985 PGA Tour Qualifying School graduates
- 1986 PGA Tour Qualifying School graduates
- 1987 PGA Tour Qualifying School graduates
- 1989 PGA Tour Qualifying School graduates
- 1995 PGA Tour Qualifying School graduates
- 1999 PGA Tour Qualifying School graduates
- List of Florida Gators men's golfers on the PGA Tour
