= Tony Sills =

American professional golfer (born 1955)

Personal information
- Full name: Anthony Irvin Sills
- Nationality: United States
- Born: December 5, 1955 (age 70) Los Angeles, California, U.S.
- Height: 5 ft 10 in (1.78 m)
- Weight: 185 lb (84 kg; 13.2 st)

Career
- Sport: Golf
- College: University of Southern California
- Turned professional: 1980
- Former tour: PGA Tour
- Professional wins: 1

Number of wins by tour
- PGA Tour: 1

Best results in major championships
- Masters Tournament: T36: 1986
- PGA Championship: T16: 1986
- U.S. Open: T15: 1985
- The Open Championship: DNP

Anthony Irvin Sills (born December 5, 1955) is an American professional golfer who played on the PGA Tour and later became a golf teaching professional.

== Early life and amateur career ==
Sills, who is Jewish, was born and raised in Los Angeles, California. As a youth, he caddied at the Riviera Country Club, including when the club hosted the Los Angeles Open. Sills attended Palisades High School and later the University of Southern California, where he was a member of the golf team with future PGA Tour golfer Scott Simpson.

== Professional career ==
In 1980, Sills turned professional. He had 22 top-10 finishes in PGA Tour events including a win at the 1990 Independent Insurance Agent Open. In that tournament, he beat Gil Morgan with a par on the first extra hole in a sudden-death playoff. His best finish in a major championship was T-15 at the 1985 U.S. Open. His best year was 1990 when he finished 61st on the money list.

After his touring days were over, Sills taught putting and the short game with Putting Arc co-founder V.J. Trolio at Old Waverly Golf Club in West Point, Mississippi.

== Personal life ==
Sills has a daughter, Emily, who played golf for the University of Tennessee.

== Awards and honors ==
In 2011 Sills was inducted into the Los Angeles High Schools Sports Hall of Fame

== Professional wins (1) ==
=== PGA Tour wins (1) ===
No.	Date	Tournament	Winning score	Margin of victory	Runner-up
1	Apr 1, 1990	Independent Insurance Agent Open	−12 (67-72-65=204) (Note: Shortened to 54 holes due to weather.)	Playoff	(United States) Gil Morgan

PGA Tour playoff record (1–0)

No.	Year	Tournament	Opponent	Result
1	1990	Independent Insurance Agent Open	(United States) Gil Morgan	Won with par on first extra hole

== Results in major championships ==
Tournament	1984	1985	1986	1987	1988	1989	1990
Masters Tournament			T36				CUT
U.S. Open	T34	T15		T31		T63	
PGA Championship	T62	CUT	T16	CUT			

Note: Sills never played in The Open Championship

Did not play

CUT = missed the half-way cut
"T" = tied

== See also ==
- 1982 PGA Tour Qualifying School graduates
- 1988 PGA Tour Qualifying School graduates
- 1989 PGA Tour Qualifying School graduates
- 1994 PGA Tour Qualifying School graduates
