= Bob Tway =

American professional golfer (born 1959)

Personal information
- Full name: Robert Raymond Tway IV
- Nationality: United States
- Born: May 4, 1959 (age 67) Oklahoma City, Oklahoma, U.S.
- Height: 6 ft 4 in (1.93 m)
- Weight: 195 lb (88 kg; 13.9 st)

Career
- Sport: Golf
- College: Oklahoma State University
- Turned professional: 1981
- Former tours: PGA Tour; Champions Tour
- Professional wins: 13
- Highest ranking: 5 (January 25, 1987)

Number of wins by tour
- PGA Tour: 8
- Other: 5

Best results in major championships (wins: 1)
- Masters Tournament: T8: 1986
- PGA Championship: Won: 1986
- U.S. Open: 3rd: 1998
- The Open Championship: T5: 1991

Achievements and awards
- Haskins Award: 1981
- PGA Player of the Year: 1986
- PGA Tour Comeback Player of the Year: 1995

Robert Raymond Tway IV (born May 4, 1959) is an American professional golfer. He has won numerous tournaments including eight PGA Tour victories. He spent 25 weeks in the top 10 of the Official World Golf Ranking in 1986–87.

== Early life ==
Tway was born in Oklahoma City, Oklahoma. He was introduced to golf at the age of five by his father and grandfather. He participated in his first tournament at age seven. He won the Redding Country Club Championship as a junior golfer in Redding, Connecticut. Tway attended Joseph Wheeler High School in Marietta, Georgia.

== Amateur career ==
Tway attended Oklahoma State University in Stillwater, Oklahoma, where he had a distinguished career as a member of the golf team — a three-time, first-team All-American his last three years. In 1978, Tway's freshman year, the Cowboys, led by seniors Lindy Miller and David Edwards, won the NCAA Championship. When Oklahoma State won again two years later, Tway was their star player. He was the winner of the Haskins Award in his senior year.

== Professional career ==
Tway turned pro in 1981 and joined the PGA Tour in 1985. In 1986, he was named PGA Player of the Year and finished the season with four victories including one major, the PGA Championship. He was second on the final money list that year — just a few dollars behind Greg Norman.

The 1986 PGA Championship was held at the Inverness Club in Toledo, Ohio. Tway finished with a score of 276 — a two-stroke margin of victory over Greg Norman. Tway holed a greenside bunker shot at the 18th hole on the final day, among the most memorable shots in golf history.

Tway is also known for recording the worst score on the 17th Hole at TPC Sawgrass, which occurred during the third round of the 2005 Players Championship. His first four attempts ended up in the water. After finally hitting the green on his fifth attempt, he three putted for 12 to go from 7-under-par and 4 strokes out of the lead to 2-over-par and 13 behind the leader.

Tway has PGA Tour career earnings in excess of 15.7 million dollars. Upon reaching the age of 50 in May 2009, Tway began play on the Champions Tour. His best finish in that venue is T-2 at the 2009 Administaff Small Business Classic, two strokes behind tournament winner John Cook.

== Personal life ==
Tway lives in Edmond, Oklahoma. His son, Kevin Tway, is a professional golfer and has won on the PGA Tour.

== Amateur wins ==
this list may be incomplete

- 1978 Trans-Mississippi Amateur
- 1980 Southern Amateur

== Professional wins (13) ==
=== PGA Tour wins (8) ===
Legend
Major championships (1)
Other PGA Tour (7)

No.	Date	Tournament	Winning score	Margin of victory	Runner(s)-up
1	Feb 9, 1986	Shearson Lehman Brothers Andy Williams Open	−12 (67-68-69=204) (Note: Shortened to 54 holes due to weather.)	Playoff	(West Germany) Bernhard Langer
2	Jun 8, 1986	Manufacturers Hanover Westchester Classic	−12 (73-63-69-67=272)	1 stroke	(United States) Willie Wood
3	Jun 22, 1986	Georgia-Pacific Atlanta Golf Classic	−19 (68-66-71-64=269)	2 strokes	(United States) Hal Sutton
4	Aug 11, 1986	PGA Championship	−8 (72-70-64-70=276)	2 strokes	(Australia) Greg Norman
5	May 14, 1989	Memorial Tournament	−11 (71-69-68-69=277)	2 strokes	(United States) Fuzzy Zoeller
6	Oct. 14, 1990	Las Vegas Invitational	−26 (67-67-65-65-70=334)	Playoff	(United States) John Cook
7	Apr 16, 1995	MCI Classic	−9 (67-69-72-67=275)	Playoff	(South Africa) David Frost, (United States) Nolan Henke
8	Sep 7, 2003	Bell Canadian Open	−8 (70-70-66-66=272)	Playoff	(United States) Brad Faxon

PGA Tour playoff record (4–4)

No.	Year	Tournament	Opponent(s)	Result
1	1986	Shearson Lehman Brothers Andy Williams Open	(West Germany) Bernhard Langer	Won with par on second extra hole
2	1988	AT&T Pebble Beach National Pro-Am	(United States) Steve Jones	Lost to birdie on second extra hole
3	1988	Southern Open	(South Africa) David Frost	Lost to birdie on first extra hole
4	1989	BellSouth Atlanta Golf Classic	(United States) Scott Simpson	Lost to par on first extra hole
5	1990	Las Vegas Invitational	(United States) John Cook	Won with par on first extra hole
6	1995	MCI Classic	(South Africa) David Frost, (United States) Nolan Henke	Won with par on second extra hole Frost eliminated by par on first hole
7	2001	Nissan Open	(Australia) Robert Allenby, (United States) Brandel Chamblee (Japan) Toshimitsu Izawa, (United States) Dennis Paulson, (United States) Jeff Sluman	Allenby won with birdie on first extra hole
8	2003	Bell Canadian Open	(United States) Brad Faxon	Won with bogey on third extra hole

=== Other wins (5) ===
- 1980 Georgia Open (as an amateur, tie with Tim Simpson)
- 1985 Oklahoma Open
- 1987 Oklahoma Open, Chrysler Team Championship (with Mike Hulbert)
- 1988 Fred Meyer Challenge (with Paul Azinger)

== Playoff record ==
Asia Golf Circuit playoff record (0–1)

No.	Year	Tournament	Opponents	Result
1	1983	Indian Open	(Taiwan) Hsieh Yu-shu, (Japan) Junichi Takahashi	Takahashi won with birdie on second extra hole

== Major championships ==
=== Wins (1) ===
Year	Championship	54 holes	Winning score	Margin	Runner-up
1986	PGA Championship	4 shot deficit	−8 (72-70-64-70=276)	2 strokes	(Australia) Greg Norman

=== Results timeline ===
Tournament	1981	1982	1983	1984	1985	1986	1987	1988	1989
Masters Tournament	CUT					T8	CUT	T33	CUT
U.S. Open						T8	T68	T25	CUT
The Open Championship						T46	T35	T20	T61
PGA Championship						1	T47	T48	CUT

Tournament	1990	1991	1992	1993	1994	1995	1996	1997	1998	1999
Masters Tournament	T36	CUT					T12	CUT	CUT	T52
U.S. Open	T33	T26		CUT	CUT	T10	T67	T5	3	T62
The Open Championship	CUT	T5	CUT			CUT	CUT	CUT	CUT	CUT
PGA Championship	T45	T66	T56	CUT	CUT	CUT	CUT	T13	T13	T57

Tournament	2000	2001	2002	2003	2004	2005	2006	2007	2008	2009
Masters Tournament	CUT				T27					
U.S. Open		T52	T59	CUT	CUT	T78				
The Open Championship	CUT		T50		70	T41				
PGA Championship	CUT	T29	CUT	CUT	T55	CUT	T65	T50	CUT	T56

Win
Top 10
Did not play

CUT = missed the half way cut
"T" indicates a tie for a place.

=== Summary ===
Tournament	Wins	2nd	3rd	Top-5	Top-10	Top-25	Events	Cuts made
Masters Tournament	0	0	0	0	1	2	13	6
U.S. Open	0	0	1	2	4	5	18	13
The Open Championship	0	0	0	1	1	2	16	8
PGA Championship	1	0	0	1	1	3	24	14
Totals	1	0	1	4	7	12	71	41

- Most consecutive cuts made – 7 (1987 U.S. Open – 1988 PGA)
- Longest streak of top-10s – 2 (1986 Masters – 1986 U.S. Open)

== Results in The Players Championship ==
Tournament	1986	1987	1988	1989	1990	1991	1992	1993	1994	1995	1996	1997	1998	1999	2000	2001	2002	2003	2004	2005	2006
The Players Championship	T10	CUT	CUT	T29	CUT	T41	T70	CUT	CUT	T68	CUT	CUT	T18	CUT	CUT	T40	T28	T17	T77	T56	CUT

Top 10

CUT = missed the halfway cut
"T" indicates a tie for a place

== Results in World Golf Championships ==
Tournament	1999	2000	2001	2002	2003	2004
Match Play	R32	R32				R64
Championship	T37		NT^{1}		T59	T28
Invitational						T6

^{1}Cancelled due to 9/11

Top 10
Did not play

QF, R16, R32, R64 = Round in which player lost in match play
"T" = Tied
NT = No tournament

== U.S. national team appearances ==
Amateur

- Eisenhower Trophy: 1980 (winners)

Professional

- Four Tours World Championship: 1986, 1991
- World Cup: 2004

== See also ==
- 1984 PGA Tour Qualifying School graduates
- List of golfers with most PGA Tour wins
- List of men's major championships winning golfers
