= Jodie Mudd =

American professional golfer (born 1960)

Personal information
- Full name: Joseph Martin Mudd
- Nationality: United States
- Born: April 23, 1960 (age 66) Louisville, Kentucky, U.S.
- Height: 5 ft 11 in (1.80 m)
- Weight: 150 lb (68 kg; 11 st)

Career
- Sport: Golf
- College: Georgia Southern University
- Turned professional: 1982
- Current tour: Champions Tour
- Former tour: PGA Tour
- Professional wins: 6
- Highest ranking: 23 (November 11, 1990)

Number of wins by tour
- PGA Tour: 4

Best results in major championships
- Masters Tournament: T4: 1987
- PGA Championship: T32: 1991
- U.S. Open: T15: 1986
- The Open Championship: T4: 1990

Joseph Martin "Jodie" Mudd (born April 23, 1960) is an American professional golfer who played on the PGA Tour.

== Early life and amateur career ==
Mudd was born in Louisville, Kentucky. He attended Georgia Southern University in Statesboro, Georgia where he developed into an honored amateur golfer.

== Professional career ==
Mudd successfully earned a spot on the PGA Tour during 1983 PGA Tour Qualifying School. Mudd won four PGA Tour events during his career. His top year was 1990, when he finished 5th on the final money list, and won two of the Tour's most prestigious non-majors: the Nabisco Championship and The Players Championship. His best finish in a major championship was T-4 at both 1987 Masters Tournament and the 1990 Open Championship.

Mudd would then become burned out from the grind of tour play and would reduce his schedule before leaving the PGA Tour in 1996. He made his Champions Tour debut on April 30, 2010, at the Mississippi Gulf Resort Classic, and played in a limited number of Champions Tour events that year. His best finish is T-20 at the 2010 Regions Charity Classic.

== Personal life ==
Mudd currently resides in St. Augustine, Florida.

== Amateur wins ==
This list is probably incomplete

- 1979 Kentucky Amateur
- 1980 Kentucky Amateur, U.S. Amateur Public Links
- 1981 Sunnehanna Amateur, U.S. Amateur Public Links

== Professional wins (6) ==
=== PGA Tour wins (4) ===
Legend
Players Championships (1)
Tour Championships (1)
Other PGA Tour (2)

No.	Date	Tournament	Winning score	To par	Margin of victory	Runner(s)-up
1	Aug 7, 1988	Federal Express St. Jude Classic	68-68-67-70=273	−15	1 stroke	(United States) Peter Jacobsen, (Zimbabwe) Nick Price
2	May 7, 1989	GTE Byron Nelson Golf Classic	68-66-66-65=265	−16	Playoff	(United States) Larry Nelson
3	Mar 18, 1990	The Players Championship	67-72-70-69=278	−10	1 stroke	(United States) Mark Calcavecchia
4	Oct 28, 1990	Nabisco Championship	68-69-68-68=273	−11	Playoff	(United States) Billy Mayfair

PGA Tour playoff record (2–2)

No.	Year	Tournament	Opponent(s)	Result
1	1985	Canon Sammy Davis Jr.-Greater Hartford Open	(United States) Phil Blackmar, (United States) Dan Pohl	Blackmar won with birdie on first extra hole
2	1985	Texas Open	(United States) John Mahaffey	Lost to par on second extra hole
3	1989	GTE Byron Nelson Golf Classic	(United States) Larry Nelson	Won with birdie on first extra hole
4	1990	Nabisco Championship	(United States) Billy Mayfair	Won with birdie on first extra hole

=== Other wins (2) ===
- 1979 Kentucky Open (as an amateur)
- 1980 Kentucky Open (as an amateur)

== Results in major championships ==
Tournament	1980	1981	1982	1983	1984	1985	1986	1987	1988	1989	1990	1991	1992
Masters Tournament			T20 LA	T42				T4	CUT	7	T30	T7	CUT
U.S. Open	CUT	CUT		CUT			T15	T17		T51	CUT	T26	
The Open Championship										5	T4	T5	T28
PGA Championship							T41	CUT	T52	67		T32	

Top 10
Did not play

LA = Low amateur
CUT = missed the half-way cut
"T" = tied

=== Summary ===
Tournament	Wins	2nd	3rd	Top-5	Top-10	Top-25	Events	Cuts made
Masters Tournament	0	0	0	1	3	4	8	6
U.S. Open	0	0	0	0	0	2	8	4
The Open Championship	0	0	0	3	3	3	4	4
PGA Championship	0	0	0	0	0	0	5	4
Totals	0	0	0	4	6	9	25	18

- Most consecutive cuts made – 6 (1988 PGA – 1990 Masters)
- Longest streak of top-10s – 2 (1990 Open Championship – 1991 Masters)

== The Players Championship ==
=== Wins (1) ===
Year	Championship	54 holes	Winning score	Margin	Runner-up
1990	The Players Championship	1 shot lead	−10 (67-72-70-69=278)	1 stroke	(United States) Mark Calcavecchia

=== Results timeline ===
Tournament	1983	1984	1985	1986	1987	1988	1989	1990	1991	1992	1993	1994	1995
The Players Championship	CUT		T40	CUT	WD	T36	CUT	1	CUT	CUT	CUT	CUT	CUT

Win
Did not play

CUT = missed the halfway cut
WD = withdrew
"T" indicates a tie for a place.

== U.S. national team appearances ==
Amateur

- Walker Cup: 1981 (winners)

Professional

- World Cup: 1990
- Four Tours World Championship: 1990

== See also ==
- 1983 PGA Tour Qualifying School graduates
