= Robert Gamez =

American professional golfer (born 1968)

Personal information
- Full name: Robert Anthony Gamez
- Nationality: United States
- Born: July 21, 1968 (age 58) Las Vegas, Nevada, U.S.
- Height: 5 ft 9 in (1.75 m)
- Weight: 180 lb (82 kg; 13 st)

Career
- Sport: Golf
- College: University of Arizona
- Turned professional: 1989
- Current tour: PGA Tour Champions
- Former tours: PGA Tour; Web.com Tour
- Professional wins: 5
- Highest ranking: 48 (March 25, 1990)

Number of wins by tour
- PGA Tour: 3
- Japan Golf Tour: 1

Best results in major championships
- Masters Tournament: CUT: 1990, 1991
- PGA Championship: T14: 2003
- U.S. Open: T61: 1990
- The Open Championship: T12: 1990

Achievements and awards
- Jack Nicklaus Award: 1989
- Haskins Award: 1989
- PGA Tour Rookie of the Year: 1990

Robert Anthony Gamez (born July 21, 1968) is an American professional golfer who currently plays on the PGA Tour.

== Early life and amateur career ==
Gamez was born in Las Vegas, Nevada. He is of Mexican descent.

Gamez attended the University of Arizona where he was a member of the golf team. He played on the 1989 Walker Cup team.

== Professional career ==
In 1989, Gamez turned professional. He has had what can be described as a hot and cold career as a professional golfer. He started out winning two tournaments in his rookie season on the Tour, including his first event, the Northern Telecom Tucson Open. Only three other players - Marty Fleckman in 1967, Ben Crenshaw in 1973, and Garrett Willis in 2001 - have won their first PGA Tour event as a member of the PGA Tour. He is possibly best known for holing his second shot from the fairway on the tough 18th hole in the final round at the Nestle Invitational in March 1990, giving him a one stroke win over Greg Norman. A commemorative plaque has since been placed in the fairway on the 18th hole at Bay Hill to mark the spot from which Gamez holed his 7-iron from 176 yards (161 m).

From 1991 to 1997, Gamez had six runner-up finishes and one third-place finish on the PGA Tour. In 1998, Gamez was injured in a car accident at the Kemper Open and his career started to decline. Between 1998 and 2001, he failed to finish in the top 125 on the PGA Tour money list. His career hit a low point in 2001, when he failed to qualify for the Tour. Then he began to enjoy a resurgence in his career. He finished in the top-125 every year between 2002 and 2005 including a T-5 at the Bank of America Colonial in 2004 and a win at the 2005 Valero Texas Open. It was his first win in 15 years, 6 months (394 events), a PGA Tour record. After 2005, Gamez's form started to decline and he has only had a few top-10 finishes since his 2005 season. Gamez also had a health scare in 2014 when he underwent quadruple bypass heart surgery. His best finish in a major is T-12 at the 1990 Open Championship.

Gamez hosts an annual tournament in Orlando, Florida for the benefit of the Team Gamez Foundation. His last full season on the PGA Tour was in 2008.

== Personal life ==
Gamez lives in Orlando.

In 2022, Gamez was arrested while intoxicated on misdemeanor battery charges at a pool party in Orlando, Florida.

== Awards and honors ==
- In 1989, Gamez won the Jack Nicklaus Award and Haskins Award, both generally given to the best college golfer in the United States.
- In 1990, he earned the PGA Tour Rookie of the Year honors.

== Amateur wins (3) ==
- 1985 Southern Nevada Amateur
- 1988 Clark County Amateur
- 1989 Porter Cup

== Professional wins (5) ==
=== PGA Tour wins (3) ===
No.	Date	Tournament	Winning score	Margin of victory	Runner(s)-up
1	Jan 14, 1990	Northern Telecom Tucson Open	−18 (65-66-69-70=270)	4 strokes	(United States) Mark Calcavecchia, (United States) Jay Haas
2	Mar 25, 1990	Nestle Invitational	−14 (71-69-68-66=274)	1 stroke	(Australia) Greg Norman
3	Sep 30, 2005	Valero Texas Open	−18 (62-68-68-64=262)	3 strokes	(United States) Olin Browne

PGA Tour playoff record (0–1)

No.	Year	Tournament	Opponent	Result
1	1993	Honda Classic	(United States) Fred Couples	Lost to par on second extra hole

=== PGA of Japan Tour wins (1) ===
No.	Date	Tournament	Winning score	Margin of victory	Runner-up
1	Nov 27, 1994	Casio World Open	−17 (68-66-68-69=271)	4 strokes	(United States) Scott Hoch

=== Other wins (1) ===
No.	Date	Tournament	Winning score	Margin of victory	Runner-up
1	Nov 20, 1994	Pebble Beach Invitational	−11 (65-71-70-71=277)	6 strokes	(United States) Kirk Triplett

Other playoff record (0–1)

No.	Year	Tournament	Opponents	Result
1	1994	JCPenney Classic (with (Sweden) Helen Alfredsson)	(United States) Brad Bryant and (Spain) Marta Figueras-Dotti	Lost to par on fourth extra hole

== Results in major championships ==
Tournament	1990	1991	1992	1993	1994	1995	1996	1997	1998	1999
Masters Tournament	CUT	CUT								
U.S. Open	T61	CUT		88	CUT	CUT				
The Open Championship	T12	T44								
PGA Championship	T49		T79	CUT		CUT		CUT		

Tournament	2000	2001	2002	2003	2004	2005	2006
Masters Tournament							
U.S. Open	CUT	CUT				CUT	
The Open Championship							
PGA Championship			CUT	T14	T68		CUT

Did not play

CUT = missed the half-way cut
"T" = tied

=== Summary ===
Tournament	Wins	2nd	3rd	Top-5	Top-10	Top-25	Events	Cuts made
Masters Tournament	0	0	0	0	0	0	2	0
U.S. Open	0	0	0	0	0	0	8	2
The Open Championship	0	0	0	0	0	1	2	2
PGA Championship	0	0	0	0	0	1	9	4
Totals	0	0	0	0	0	2	21	8

- Most consecutive cuts made – 3 (1990 U.S. Open – 1990 PGA)
- Longest streak of top-10s – 0

== Results in The Players Championship ==
Tournament	1990	1991	1992	1993	1994	1995	1996	1997	1998	1999	2000	2001	2002	2003	2004	2005	2006
The Players Championship	T46	CUT	CUT	CUT	84	T49	T29	T24	T63					T69	CUT	T56	T53

Did not play

CUT = missed the halfway cut
"T" indicates a tie for a place

== Results in World Golf Championships ==
Tournament	2006
Match Play	
Championship	
Invitational	T18

Did not play

"T" = Tied

== U.S. national team appearances ==
Amateur

- Walker Cup: 1989

== See also ==
- 1989 PGA Tour Qualifying School graduates
