= Liam Higgins (golfer) =

Irish professional golfer (born 1942)

Personal information
- Nationality: Ireland
- Born: 13 November 1942 (age 83)
- Height: 1.78 m (5 ft 10 in)
- Weight: 82 kg (181 lb; 12.9 st)
- Children: 2, including David

Career
- Sport: Golf
- Turned professional: 1972
- Former tours: European Tour; European Seniors Tour
- Professional wins: 6

Number of wins by tour
- European Tour: 1
- European Senior Tour: 3
- Other: 2

Best results in major championships
- Masters Tournament: DNP
- PGA Championship: DNP
- U.S. Open: DNP
- The Open Championship: T63: 1976

Liam Higgins (born 13 November 1942) is an Irish professional golfer. He won the 1977 Kerrygold International Classic, a European Tour event, at his home club, Waterville Golf Links. After reaching 50, he had a successful senior career, winning three times on the European Seniors Tour and being runner-up a further five times.

Higgins set a world long-drive record in 1984, hitting a ball 634 yards on the runway at Baldonnel Military Airport in Dublin.

Higgins, and his sons David and Brian, are now involved with training and development for member golfers as the golf professionals at Waterville Golf Links.

== Professional wins (6) ==
=== European Tour wins (1) ===
No.	Date	Tournament	Winning score	Margin of victory	Runner-up
1	5 Jun 1977	Kerrygold International	−1 (65-73-74-75=287)	2 strokes	(England) Martin Foster

=== Safari Circuit wins (1) ===
No.	Date	Tournament	Winning score	Margin of victory	Runners-up
1	13 Mar 1977	Kenya Open	−1 (70-69-73-71=283)	2 strokes	(England) Gary Smith, (England) Bob Wynn

=== Other wins (1) ===
- 1983 Irish PGA Championship

=== European Seniors Tour wins (3) ===
No.	Date	Tournament	Winning score	Margin of victory	Runner-up
1	25 Aug 1994	Joe Powell Memorial Seniors Classic	−6 (70-70-70=210)	4 strokes	(England) Malcolm Gregson
2	24 Sep 1994	Zurich Senior Lexus Trophy	−16 (67-66-67=200)	3 strokes	(Spain) Antonio Garrido
3	7 Oct 1995	Senior Zurich Lexus Trophy (2)	−10 (69-70-67=206)	5 strokes	(Australia) Randall Vines

== Results in major championships ==
Tournament	1973	1974	1975	1976	1977	1978
The Open Championship	CUT			T63	CUT	CUT

Note: Higgins only played in The Open Championship.

Did not play

CUT = missed the half-way cut
"T" = tied
