= 1991 Volvo PGA Championship =

Tournament information
- Dates: 24–27 May 1991
- Location: Virginia Water, Surrey, England; 51.40°N 0.59°W
- Courses: Wentworth Club; West Course
- Tour: European Tour

Statistics
- Par: 72
- Field: 147 players, 66 after cut
- Cut: 145 (+1)
- Prize fund: €500,750
- Winner's share: €116,662

Champion
- (Spain) Seve Ballesteros
- 271 (−17)

Location map
- Location in England Location in Surrey

The 1991 Volvo PGA Championship was the 37th edition of the Volvo PGA Championship, an annual professional golf tournament on the European Tour. It was held 24–27 May at the West Course of Wentworth Club in Virginia Water, Surrey, England, a suburb southwest of London.

The event was won by Seve Ballesteros, defeating Colin Montgomerie in a playoff. It was his second Volvo PGA Championship win.

== Round summaries ==
=== First round ===
Thursday, 24 May 1991

Place	Player	Score	To par
1	(Australia) Wayne Riley	63	−9
2	(Scotland) Gordon Brand Jnr	66	−6
T3	(Spain) Seve Ballesteros	67	−5
T3	(England) Russell Claydon	67	−5
T3	(England) Mark James	67	−5
T3	(Germany) Bernhard Langer	67	−5
T3	(United States) Peter Teravainen	67	−5
T8	(Scotland) Brian Barnes	68	−4
T8	(England) Richard Boxall	68	−4
T8	(England) Chris Moody	68	−4
T8	(United States) Bryan Norton	68	−4
T8	(Sweden) Johan Ryström	68	−4
T8	(Scotland) Peter Smith	68	−4

=== Second round ===
Friday, 25 May 1991

Place	Player	Score	To par
T1	(Germany) Bernhard Langer	67-67=134	−10
T1	(Australia) Wayne Riley	63-71=134	−10
T3	(Scotland) Gordon Brand Jnr	66-69=135	−9
T3	(Republic of Ireland) Eamonn Darcy	69-66=135	−9
T3	(England) Mark James	67-68=135	−9
T3	(Scotland) Colin Montgomerie	69-66=135	−9
T3	(England) Steven Richardson	69-66=135	−9
T8	(Spain) Seve Ballesteros	67-69=136	−8
T8	(England) Richard Boxall	68-68=136	−8
T10	(Australia) Rodger Davis	71-66=137	−7
T10	(England) Stephen Field	69-68=137	−7
T10	(Sweden) Johan Ryström	68-69=137	−7

=== Third round ===
Saturday, 26 May 1991

Place	Player	Score	To par
1	(Spain) Seve Ballesteros	67-69-65=201	−15
2	(Germany) Bernhard Langer	67-67-69=203	−13
T3	(England) Nick Faldo	69-70-65=204	−12
T3	(Scotland) Colin Montgomerie	69-66-69=204	−12
T5	(Republic of Ireland) Eamonn Darcy	69-66-70=205	−11
T5	(Australia) Rodger Davis	71-66-68=205	−11
T5	(Sweden) Jesper Parnevik	73-67-65=205	−11
T5	(Australia) Wayne Riley	63-71-71=205	−11
T5	(Sweden) Johan Ryström	68-69-68=205	−11
T10	(Scotland) Brian Barnes	68-70-68=206	−10
T10	(Scotland) Gordon Brand Jnr	66-69-71=206	−10
T10	(Wales) Ian Woosnam	70-70-66=206	−10

=== Final round ===
Sunday, 27 May 1991

Place	Player	Score	To par	Money (€)
T1	(Spain) Seve Ballesteros	67-69-65-70=271	−17	Playoff
T1	(Scotland) Colin Montgomerie	69-66-69-67=271	−17	Playoff
3	(Republic of Ireland) Eamonn Darcy	69-66-70-67=272	−16	43,820
4	(Germany) Bernhard Langer	67-67-69-70=273	−15	35,000
T5	(England) Nick Faldo	69-70-65-70=274	−14	27,090
T5	(Sweden) Jesper Parnevik	73-67-65-69=274	−14	27,090
7	(Scotland) Gordon Brand Jnr	66-69-71-70=276	−12	21,000
T8	(Australia) Rodger Davis	71-66-68-72=277	−11	14,994
T8	(Scotland) Sandy Lyle	71-72-69-65=277	−11	14,994
T8	(Spain) José Rivero	69-70-69-69=277	−11	14,994
T8	(Sweden) Johan Ryström	68-69-68-72=277	−11	14,994

=== Playoff ===
The playoff took place on the par four 1st; Ballesteros hit a golf buggy with his drive, but hit a 5-iron to 3 feet with his second shot, setting up a birdie three. Montgomerie could only manage par.

Place	Player	Score	To par	Money (€)
1	(Spain) Seve Ballesteros	3	−1	116,662
2	(Scotland) Colin Montgomerie	4	E	77,770
