= Benson & Hedges International Open =

Men's professional golf tournament in England

Tournament information
- Location: England
- Established: 1971
- Courses: The Belfry (Brabazon Course)
- Par: 72
- Length: 7,119 yd (6,510 m)
- Tour: European Tour
- Format: Stroke play
- Prize fund: £1,100,000
- Month played: May
- Final year: 2003

Tournament record score
- Aggregate: 266 Vicente Fernández (1975)
- To par: −18 Vicente Fernández (1975) −18 Sam Torrance (1984)

Final champion
- (England) Paul Casey
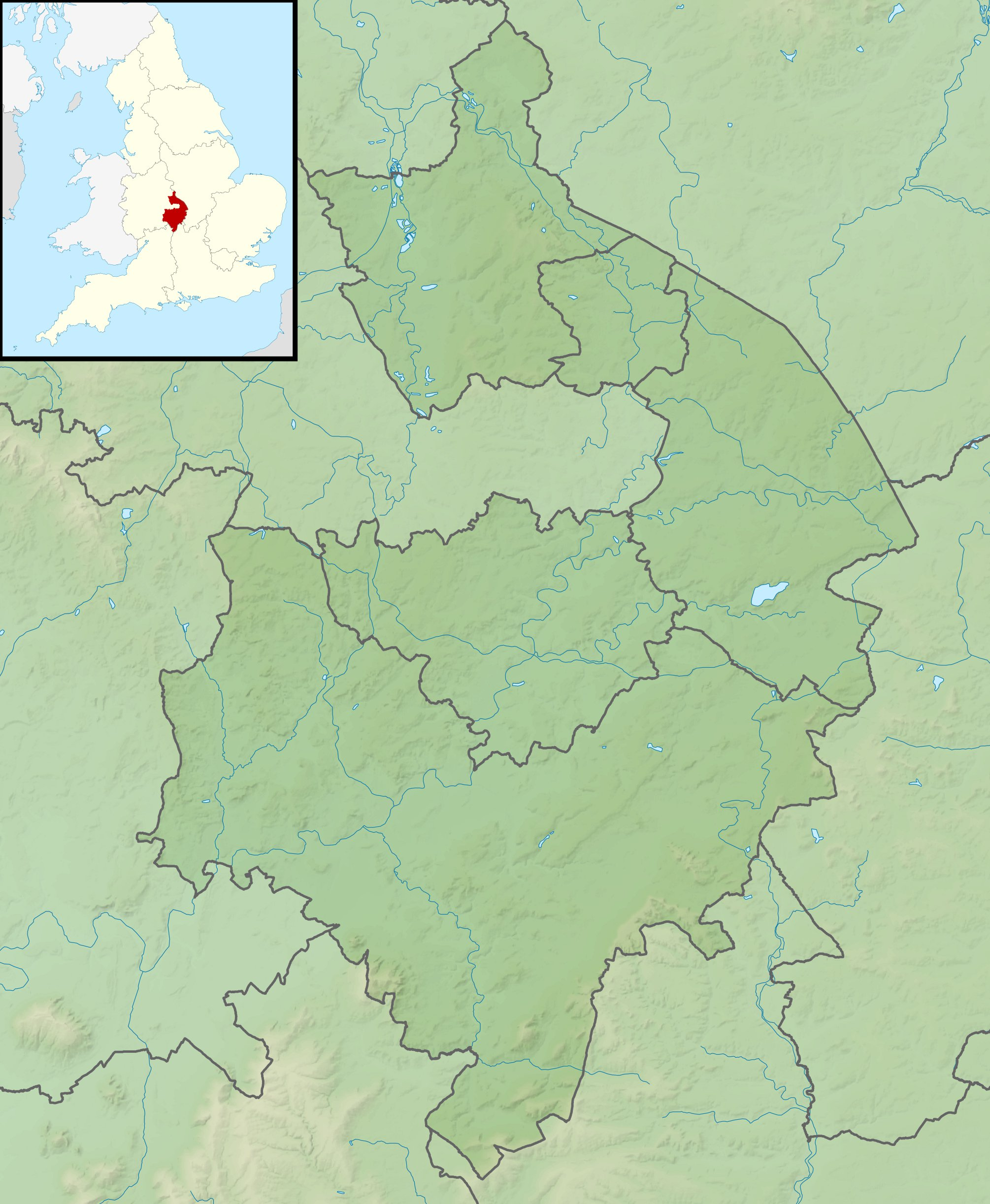
- Location in England Location in Warwickshire

The Benson & Hedges International Open was a men's professional golf tournament which was played in England. It was founded in 1971 and for its first five years it was called the Benson & Hedges Festival of Golf. It was sponsored by Benson & Hedges, a cigarette company. It was part of the European Tour's annual schedule from the tour's first season in 1972 until the tournament ceased in 2003, following the introduction of a ban on tobacco advertising and sponsorship of sporting events by the British government. The prize fund for the final edition of the tournament was €1,596,861, which was mid-range for a European Tour event at the time.

== Winners ==
Year	Winner	Score	To par	Margin of victory	Runner(s)-up	Venue	Ref.
Benson & Hedges International Open
2003	(England) Paul Casey	277	−11	4 strokes	(Republic of Ireland) Pádraig Harrington	The Belfry	
2002	(Argentina) Ángel Cabrera	278	−10	1 stroke	(England) Barry Lane	The Belfry	
2001	(Sweden) Henrik Stenson	275	−13	3 strokes	(Argentina) Ángel Cabrera (Republic of Ireland) Paul McGinley	The Belfry	
2000	(Spain) José María Olazábal (2)	275	−13	3 strokes	(Wales) Phillip Price	The Belfry	
1999	(Scotland) Colin Montgomerie	273	−15	3 strokes	(Argentina) Ángel Cabrera (Sweden) Per-Ulrik Johansson	The Oxfordshire	
1998	(Northern Ireland) Darren Clarke	273	−15	3 strokes	(Spain) Santiago Luna	The Oxfordshire	
1997	(Germany) Bernhard Langer (2)	276	−12	2 strokes	(Wales) Ian Woosnam	The Oxfordshire	
1996	(Trinidad and Tobago) Stephen Ames	283	−5	1 stroke	(England) Jon Robson	The Oxfordshire	
1995	(Australia) Peter O'Malley	280	−8	1 stroke	(England) Mark James (Italy) Costantino Rocca	St Mellion International	
1994	(Spain) Seve Ballesteros	281	−7	3 strokes	(England) Nick Faldo	St Mellion International	
1993	(England) Paul Broadhurst	276	−12	1 stroke	(England) Mark James (Spain) José María Olazábal	St Mellion International	
1992	(Australia) Peter Senior	287	−1	Playoff	(Zimbabwe) Tony Johnstone	St Mellion International	
1991	(Germany) Bernhard Langer	286	−2	2 strokes	(Fiji) Vijay Singh	St Mellion International	
1990	(Spain) José María Olazábal	279	−9	1 stroke	(Wales) Ian Woosnam	St Mellion International	
1989	(Scotland) Gordon Brand Jnr	272	−12	1 stroke	(England) Derrick Cooper	Fulford	
1988	(England) Peter Baker	271	−17	Playoff	(England) Nick Faldo	Fulford	
1987	(Australia) Noel Ratcliffe	275	−13	2 strokes	(Sweden) Ove Sellberg	Fulford	
1986	(England) Mark James	274	−14	Playoff	(South Africa) Hugh Baiocchi (United States) Lee Trevino	Fulford	
1985	(Scotland) Sandy Lyle	274	−14	1 stroke	(Wales) Ian Woosnam	Fulford	
1984	(Scotland) Sam Torrance	270	−18	1 stroke	(Australia) Wayne Grady	Fulford	
1983	(South Africa) John Bland	273	−15	1 stroke	(West Germany) Bernhard Langer	Fulford	
1982	(Australia) Greg Norman	283	−5	1 stroke	(New Zealand) Bob Charles (Australia) Graham Marsh (Wales) Ian Woosnam	Fulford	
1981	(United States) Tom Weiskopf	272	−16	1 stroke	(Republic of Ireland) Eamonn Darcy (West Germany) Bernhard Langer	Fulford	
1980	(Australia) Graham Marsh (2)	272	−16	2 strokes	(South Africa) John Bland	Fulford	
1979	(England) Maurice Bembridge	272	−8	2 strokes	(Scotland) Ken Brown	St. Mellion International	
1978	(United States) Lee Trevino	274	−10	Playoff	(England) Neil Coles (Australia) Noel Ratcliffe	Fulford	
1977	(Spain) Antonio Garrido	280	−4	3 strokes	(New Zealand) Bob Charles	Fulford	
1976	(Australia) Graham Marsh	272	−12	2 strokes	(England) Mark James	Fulford	
Benson & Hedges Festival of Golf
1975	(Argentina) Vicente Fernández	266	−18	1 stroke	(England) Maurice Bembridge	Fulford	
1974	(Belgium) Philippe Toussaint	276	−8	Playoff	(Australia) Bob Shearer	Fulford	
1973	(South Africa) Vin Baker	276	−8	2 strokes	(South Africa) Dale Hayes	Fulford	
1972	(Australia) Jack Newton	281	−3	1 stroke	(Scotland) Harry Bannerman	Fulford	
1971	(England) Tony Jacklin	279	−5	Playoff	(England) Peter Butler	Fulford	
