= 1988 Europcar Cup =

Professional team golf tournament

Tournament information
- Location: Biarritz, France
- Established: 1985
- Course: Golf de Biarritz Le Phare
- Par: 69
- Tour: European Tour
- Format: 4-man team stroke play
- Month played: November
- Final year: 1988

Final champion
- Sweden (Persson, Ryström, Lanner, Parnevik)

The 1988 Europcar Cup was a professional team golf tournament played 3-6 November 1988 in Biarritz, France. It was the fourth Europcar Cup.

The tournament was designated as an "Approved Special Event" on the European Tour schedule. A further event was planned in 1989 but was cancelled.

The event was contested by national teams of four players. Each golfer played four stroke-play rounds; the best three scores for each round being used for the team's score for that round.

Sweden won the event by 7 strokes with a score of 810, 18 under par. In the Swedish team played Magnus Persson, Johan Ryström, Mats Lanner and Jesper Parnevik. The second placed team was Spain, with Juan Anglada, Antonio Garrido, José Gervas and Miguel Ángel Martín.

The players in the winning team received FRF 35,000 each in prize money. The players in the second placed team received FRF 22,500 each.

Individual winner was David Jones, Ireland, scoring 12 under par.

The following teams competed: Austria, Belgium, Denmark, England, Finland, France, Greece, Ireland, Italy, Netherlands, Scotland, Spain, Sweden, Switzerland, Wales, West Germany.

== Scores ==
Team

| Position | Team | Score |
|---|---|---|
| 1 | Sweden | 810 (−18) |
| 2 | Spain | 817 (−11) |
| T3 | England | 820 (−8) |
| T3 | (Republic of Ireland) Ireland (Note: All-Ireland team) | 820 (−8) |
| 5 | France | 828 (E) |
| 6 | Wales | 830 (+2) |
| 7 | Italy | 832 (+4) |
| 8 | West Germany | 838 (+10) |
| 9 | Scotland | 840 (+12) |
| 10 | Denmark | 848 (+20) |
| 11 | Switzerland | 850 (+22) |
| 12 | Finland | 869 (+41) |
| T13 | Greece | 876 (+48) |
| T13 | Austria | 876 (+48) |
| 15 | Netherlands | 888 (+60) |
| 16 | Belgium | 896 (+68) |

Individual

| Position | Player | Score |
|---|---|---|
| 1 | (Republic of Ireland) David Jones | −12 (66-66-69-63=264) |
| T2 | (Spain) Antonio Garrido | −4 (69-69-68-66=272) |
| T2 | (Spain) José Gervas | −4 (69-70-66-67=272) |
