= Germán Garrido =

Spanish golfer

Personal information
- Full name: Germán Garrido Cánora
- Nationality: Spain
- Born: 15 June 1948 (age 78) Madrid, Spain
- Height: 1.75 m (5 ft 9 in)

Career
- Sport: Golf
- Turned professional: 1963
- Former tour: European Tour
- Professional wins: 3

Number of wins by tour
- European Tour: 1
- Other: 2

Germán Garrido Cánora (born 15 June 1948) is a member of one of Spain's most successful golfing families. His brother Antonio and nephew Ignacio were only the second father-son combination to have played in the Ryder Cup.

== Professional career ==
In 1963, Garrido turned professional at the age of 15.

He finished second twice in the Spanish Professional Closed Championship; in 1972 at Atalaya Park, tied with Francisco Abreu, losing in a play-off against Valentín Barrios, and in 1975 at La Manga, one shot behind his brother Antonio.

He played on the European circuit both before and after the establishment of the formal European Tour in 1972, winning the Madrid Open in 1968 and 1973 and the Portuguese Open in 1972. With his win in the 1973 Madrid Open, Garrido and his brother became the first pair of brothers to win on the European Tour.

== Professional wins (3) ==
=== European Tour wins (1) ===
No.	Date	Tournament	Winning score	Margin of victory	Runner-up
1	31 Mar 1973	Madrid Open	−1 (67-74-73-73=287)	1 stroke	(Spain) Emilio Perera

=== Other wins (2) ===
- 1968 Madrid Open
- 1972 Portuguese Open
