= 1979 Ryder Cup =

23rd Ryder Cup held September 14–16

23rd Ryder Cup Matches
- Dates: September 14–16, 1979
- Venue: The Greenbrier, The Greenbrier Course
- Location: White Sulphur Springs, West Virginia
- Captains: Billy Casper (USA); John Jacobs (Europe)
| (United States) | 17 | 11 | (Europe) |
- United States wins the Ryder Cup

Location map
- Location within West Virginia

The 23rd Ryder Cup Matches were held September 14–16, 1979, in the United States, at the Greenbrier Course of The Greenbrier in White Sulphur Springs, West Virginia.

It was the beginning of a new era for the Ryder Cup. For the first time, players from continental Europe took part in the Ryder Cup (specifically, Seve Ballesteros and Antonio Garrido of Spain). The new Team Europe replaced Great Britain and Ireland as the official opposition to the United States. It was hoped that the change would help raise the profile of the competition and bring about the end of near total domination by the United States that had existed since the end of the Second World War. However the change made no real impact at the first attempt as the United States won the competition easily by a score of 17 to 11 points and led after every session. Ballesteros and Garrido played together in all four team sessions and were 1–3; both lost their singles matches on Sunday. All four of Ballesteros' losses came against Larry Nelson.

Jack Nicklaus, age 39, failed to make the team for the first time since missing his first chance at making the team in 1967. Tom Watson left the day before the competition for the birth of his first child and was replaced on the team by first alternate Mark Hayes.

== Format ==
The Ryder Cup is a match play event, with each match worth one point. The competition format was similar to the formats used from 1963 through 1975, but with fewer singles matches:

- Day 1 — 4 four-ball (better ball) matches in a morning session and 4 foursome (alternate shot) matches in an afternoon session
- Day 2 — 4 foursome matches in a morning session and 4 four-ball matches in an afternoon session
- Day 3 — 12 singles matches, 6 each in morning and afternoon sessions

With a total of 28 points, 14 1/2 points were required to win the Cup. All matches were played to a maximum of 18 holes.

== Teams ==
Team USA
| Name | Age | Points rank | Previous Ryder Cups | Matches | W–L–H | Winning percentage |
| Billy Casper | 48 | Non-playing captain |
| Gil Morgan | 32 | | 0 | Rookie |
| Hubert Green | 32 | | 1 | 2 | 2–0–0 | 100.00 |
| Larry Nelson | 32 | | 0 | Rookie |
| John Mahaffey | 31 | | 0 | Rookie |
| Tom Kite | 29 | | 0 | Rookie |
| Lee Trevino | 39 | | 4 | 22 | 11–6–5 | 61.36 |
| Hale Irwin | 34 | | 2 | 8 | 6–1–1 | 81.25 |
| Lanny Wadkins | 29 | | 1 | 3 | 3–0–0 | 100.00 |
| Andy Bean | 26 | | 0 | Rookie |
| Fuzzy Zoeller | 27 | | 0 | Rookie |
| Lee Elder | 45 | | 0 | Rookie |
| Mark Hayes | 30 | | 0 | Rookie |

Mark Hayes replaced Tom Watson.

Team Europe
| Name | Age | Points rank | Previous Ryder Cups | Matches | W–L–H | Winning percentage |
| (England) John Jacobs | 54 | Non-playing captain |
| (Spain) Seve Ballesteros | 22 | 1 | 0 | Rookie |
| (England) Mark James | 25 | 2 | 1 | 3 | 0–3–0 | 0.00 |
| (Scotland) Brian Barnes | 34 | 3 | 5 | 20 | 7–12–1 | 37.50 |
| (Scotland) Bernard Gallacher | 30 | 4 | 5 | 20 | 8–8–4 | 50.00 |
| (Scotland) Sandy Lyle | 21 | 5 | 0 | Rookie |
| (Scotland) Ken Brown | 22 | 6 | 1 | 1 | 0–1–0 | 0.00 |
| (Spain) Antonio Garrido | 35 | 7 | 0 | Rookie |
| (England) Tony Jacklin | 35 | 8 | 6 | 31 | 12–12–7 | 50.00 |
| (England) Michael King | 29 | 9 | 0 | Rookie |
| (England) Nick Faldo | 22 | 10 | 1 | 3 | 3–0–0 | 100.00 |
| (Republic of Ireland) Des Smyth | 26 | 12 | 0 | Rookie |
| (England) Peter Oosterhuis | 31 | – | 4 | 21 | 12–6–3 | 64.29 |

The wild card selections are shown in yellow.

== Friday's matches ==
September 14, 1979

=== Morning four-ball ===
| | Results |
|---|---|---|
| Garrido/Ballesteros | (United States) 2 & 1 | Wadkins/Nelson |
| Brown/James | (United States) 3 & 2 | Trevino/Zoeller |
| Oosterhuis/Faldo | (United States) 2 & 1 | Bean/Elder |
| Gallacher/Barnes | (Europe) 2 & 1 | Irwin/Mahaffey |
| 1 | Session | 3 |
| 1 | Overall | 3 |

=== Afternoon foursomes ===
| | Results |
|---|---|---|
| Brown/Smyth | (United States) 7 & 6 | Irwin/Kite |
| Ballesteros/Garrido | (Europe) 3 & 2 | Zoeller/Green |
| Lyle/Jacklin | halved | Trevino/Morgan |
| Gallacher/Barnes | (United States) 4 & 3 | Wadkins/Nelson |
| 1 1/2 | Session | 2 1/2 |
| 2 1/2 | Overall | 5 1/2 |

== Saturday's matches ==
September 15, 1979

=== Morning foursomes ===
| | Results |
|---|---|---|
| Jacklin/Lyle | (Europe) 5 & 4 | Elder/Mahaffey |
| Faldo/Oosterhuis | (Europe) 6 & 5 | Bean/Kite |
| Gallacher/Barnes | (Europe) 2 & 1 | Zoeller/Hayes |
| Ballesteros/Garrido | (United States) 3 & 2 | Wadkins/Nelson |
| 3 | Session | 1 |
| 5 1/2 | Overall | 6 1/2 |

=== Afternoon four-ball ===
| | Results |
|---|---|---|
| Ballesteros/Garrido | (United States) 5 & 4 | Wadkins/Nelson |
| Jacklin/Lyle | (United States) 1 up | Irwin/Kite |
| Gallacher/Barnes | (Europe) 3 & 2 | Trevino/Zoeller |
| Faldo/Oosterhuis | (Europe) 1 up | Elder/Hayes |
| 2 | Session | 2 |
| 7 1/2 | Overall | 8 1/2 |

== Sunday's matches ==
September 16, 1979

=== Morning singles ===
| | Results |
|---|---|---|
| Bernard Gallacher | (Europe) 3 & 2 | Lanny Wadkins |
| Seve Ballesteros | (United States) 3 & 2 | Larry Nelson |
| Tony Jacklin | (United States) 1 up | Tom Kite |
| Antonio Garrido | (United States) 1 up | Mark Hayes |
| Michael King | (United States) 4 & 3 | Andy Bean |
| Brian Barnes | (United States) 1 up | John Mahaffey |
| 1 | Session | 5 |
| 8 1/2 | Overall | 13 1/2 |

=== Afternoon singles ===
| | Results |
|---|---|---|
| Nick Faldo | (Europe) 3 & 2 | Lee Elder |
| Des Smyth | (United States) 5 & 3 | Hale Irwin |
| Peter Oosterhuis | (United States) 2 up | Hubert Green |
| Ken Brown | (Europe) 1 up | Fuzzy Zoeller |
| Sandy Lyle | (United States) 2 & 1 | Lee Trevino |
| Mark James | halved | Gil Morgan |
| 2 1/2 | Session | 3 1/2 |
| 11 | Overall | 17 |

== Individual player records ==
Each entry refers to the win–loss–half record of the player.

=== United States ===
| Player | Points | Overall | Singles | Foursomes | Fourballs |
|---|---|---|---|---|---|
| Andy Bean | 2 | 2–1–0 | 1–0–0 | 0–1–0 | 1–0–0 |
| Lee Elder | 1 | 1–3–0 | 0–1–0 | 0–1–0 | 1–1–0 |
| Hubert Green | 1 | 1–1–0 | 1–0–0 | 0–1–0 | 0–0–0 |
| Mark Hayes | 1 | 1–2–0 | 1–0–0 | 0–1–0 | 0–1–0 |
| Hale Irwin | 3 | 3–1–0 | 1–0–0 | 1–0–0 | 1–1–0 |
| Tom Kite | 3 | 3–1–0 | 1–0–0 | 1–1–0 | 1–0–0 |
| John Mahaffey | 1 | 1–2–0 | 1–0–0 | 0–1–0 | 0–1–0 |
| Gil Morgan | 1 | 0–0–2 | 0–0–1 | 0–0–1 | 0–0–0 |
| Larry Nelson | 5 | 5–0–0 | 1–0–0 | 2–0–0 | 2–0–0 |
| Lee Trevino | 2.5 | 2–1–1 | 1–0–0 | 0–0–1 | 1–1–0 |
| Lanny Wadkins | 4 | 4–1–0 | 0–1–0 | 2–0–0 | 2–0–0 |
| Fuzzy Zoeller | 1 | 1–4–0 | 0–1–0 | 0–2–0 | 1–1–0 |

=== Europe ===
| Player | Points | Overall | Singles | Foursomes | Fourballs |
|---|---|---|---|---|---|
| Seve Ballesteros | 1 | 1–4–0 | 0–1–0 | 1–1–0 | 0–2–0 |
| Brian Barnes | 3 | 3–2–0 | 0–1–0 | 1–1–0 | 2–0–0 |
| Ken Brown | 1 | 1–2–0 | 1–0–0 | 0–1–0 | 0–1–0 |
| Nick Faldo | 3 | 3–1–0 | 1–0–0 | 1–0–0 | 1–1–0 |
| Bernard Gallacher | 4 | 4–1–0 | 1–0–0 | 1–1–0 | 2–0–0 |
| Antonio Garrido | 1 | 1–4–0 | 0–1–0 | 1–1–0 | 0–2–0 |
| Tony Jacklin | 1.5 | 1–2–1 | 0–1–0 | 1–0–1 | 0–1–0 |
| Mark James | 0.5 | 0–1–1 | 0–0–1 | 0–0–0 | 0–1–0 |
| Michael King | 0 | 0–1–0 | 0–1–0 | 0–0–0 | 0–0–0 |
| Sandy Lyle | 1.5 | 1–2–1 | 0–1–0 | 1–0–1 | 0–1–0 |
| Peter Oosterhuis | 2 | 2–2–0 | 0–1–0 | 1–0–0 | 1–1–0 |
| Des Smyth | 0 | 0–2–0 | 0–1–0 | 0–1–0 | 0–0–0 |

== Controversy and fallout ==
Due to their behaviour both on and off the course, the PGA levied Mark James and Ken Brown with the highest fines in professional golf up to that point. Both forfeited their match fee of £1000, with James receiving an additional £500 fine and Brown a suspension from international duty for 12 months. It was reported that James had failed to wear team uniform when requested, missed meetings and misbehaved during social functions. In addition to missing meetings and behaving improperly at social functions, Brown was also cited for his attitude towards playing partner Des Smyth and their opponents during the opening afternoon foursomes matches.

== Video ==
- You Tube: 1979 Ryder Cup Sunday singles
