= 1973 European Tour =

Golf tour season

1973 European Tour season
- Duration: 28 March 1973 – 6 October 1973
- Number of official events: 21
- Most wins: (England) Peter Oosterhuis (3)
- Order of Merit: (England) Peter Oosterhuis
- Sir Henry Cotton Rookie of the Year: (England) Pip Elson

The 1973 European Tour, titled as the 1973 PGA European Tour, was the second season of the European Tour, the main professional golf tour in Europe since its inaugural season in 1972.

== Changes for 1973 ==
There were three changes from the previous season, with the addition of the Portuguese Open and the Scandinavian Enterprise Open and the loss of the John Player Trophy.

== Schedule ==
The following table lists official events during the 1973 season.

Date	Tournament	Host country	Purse (£)	Winner (Note: The number in brackets after each winner's name is the number of European Tour events they had won up to and including that tournament. This information is only shown for European Tour members and are inclusive of the three United States-based major championships which were included on the schedule for the first time in 1998, with earlier editions having retrospectively been recognised as official tour wins.)	Notes
31 Mar	Madrid Open	Spain	15,000	(Spain) Germán Garrido (1)	
7 Apr	Portuguese Open	Portugal	15,000	(Spain) Jaime Benito (1)	New to European Tour
9 Apr	Masters Tournament	United States	US$224,825	(United States) Tommy Aaron (n/a)	Major championship (Note: Unofficial money event at the time, but retrospectively counted as an official win.)
14 Apr	Spanish Open	Spain	25,000	(England) Neil Coles (2)	
21 Apr	Italian Open	Italy	25,750	(England) Tony Jacklin (2)	
28 Apr	Piccadilly Medal	England	12,000	(England) Peter Oosterhuis (2)	
12 May	Penfold-Bournemouth Tournament	England	8,000	(Northern Ireland) Eddie Polland (1)	
26 May	Benson & Hedges Match Play Championship	England	20,000	(England) Neil Coles (3)	
3 Jun	French Open	France	15,000	(England) Peter Oosterhuis (3)	
9 Jun	Martini International	Scotland	10,000	(England) Maurice Bembridge (1)	
17 Jun	U.S. Open	United States	US$227,200	(United States) Johnny Miller (n/a)	Major championship
24 Jun	Carroll's International	Ireland	15,000	(Republic of Ireland) Paddy McGuirk (1)	
30 Jun	Sunbeam Electric Scottish Open	Scotland	15,000	(Australia) Graham Marsh (3)	
14 Jul	The Open Championship	Scotland	50,000	(United States) Tom Weiskopf (n/a)	Major championship
22 Jul	Scandinavian Enterprise Open	Sweden	19,410	(New Zealand) Bob Charles (3)	New tournament
29 Jul	Swiss Open	Switzerland	17,850	(South Africa) Hugh Baiocchi (1)	
5 Aug	German Open	West Germany	17,210	(Spain) Francisco Abreu (1)	
12 Aug	Dutch Open	Netherlands	18,700	(England) Doug McClelland (1)	
12 Aug	PGA Championship	United States	US$225,000	(United States) Jack Nicklaus (n/a)	Major championship
18 Aug	Benson & Hedges Festival of Golf	England	15,000	(South Africa) Vin Baker (1)	
25 Aug	Viyella PGA Championship	England	15,000	(England) Peter Oosterhuis (4)	
8 Sep	W.D. & H.O. Wills Tournament	England	15,000	(United States) Charles Coody (n/a)	
29 Sep	John Player Classic	Scotland	58,000	(United States) Charles Coody (n/a)	
6 Oct	Dunlop Masters	Wales	15,000	(England) Tony Jacklin (3)	

=== Unofficial events ===
The following events were sanctioned by the European Tour, but did not carry official money, nor were wins official.

Date	Tournament	Host country	Purse (£)	Winner(s)	Notes
19 May	Sumrie Better-Ball	Scotland	8,000	(England) Neil Coles and (England) Bernard Hunt	Team event
16 Jun	Coca-Cola Young Professionals' Championship	England	4,000	(Scotland) Bernard Gallacher	
20 Jul	Lord Derby's Under-25 Match Play Championship	England	2,500	(England) Brian Thompson	
1 Sep	Double Diamond International	England	15,000	Team Scotland	Team event
22 Sep	Ryder Cup	Scotland	n/a	Team USA	Team event
13 Oct	Piccadilly World Match Play Championship	England	30,000	(South Africa) Gary Player	Limited-field event
25 Nov	World Cup	Spain	US$4,200	(United States) Johnny Miller and (United States) Jack Nicklaus	Team event
25 Nov	World Cup Individual Trophy	Spain	US$2,100	(United States) Johnny Miller	

== Order of Merit ==
The Order of Merit was based on tournament results during the season, calculated using a points-based system.

Position	Player	Points	Prize money (£)
1	(England) Peter Oosterhuis	3,440	17,455
2	(England) Maurice Bembridge	2,980	10,773
3	(South Africa) Hugh Baiocchi	2,904	11,870
4	(South Africa) Dale Hayes	2,736	10,188
5	(Scotland) Brian Barnes	2,676	9,778
6	(Northern Ireland) Eddie Polland	2,635	8,146
7	(England) Tony Jacklin	2,588	24,840
8	(Scotland) Bernard Gallacher	2,561	8,676
9	(England) Neil Coles	2,437	14,748
10	(Australia) Jack Newton	2,399	7,939

== Awards ==
Award	Winner	Ref.
Sir Henry Cotton Rookie of the Year	(England) Pip Elson	
