= 1991 European Tour =

Golf tour season

1991 European Tour season
- Duration: 7 February 1991 – 27 October 1991
- Number of official events: 34 (Note: A further four tournaments were scheduled but were cancelled.)
- Most wins: (Wales) Ian Woosnam (3)
- Order of Merit: (Spain) Seve Ballesteros
- Golfer of the Year: (Spain) Seve Ballesteros
- Sir Henry Cotton Rookie of the Year: (Sweden) Per-Ulrik Johansson

The 1991 European Tour, titled as the 1991 Volvo Tour for sponsorship reasons, was the 20th season of the European Tour, the main professional golf tour in Europe since its inaugural season in 1972.

It was the fourth season of the tour under a title sponsorship agreement with Volvo, that was announced in May 1987.

== Changes for 1991 ==
There were several changes from the previous season, with the return of both the Catalan Open and the Jersey Open; the addition of the Girona Open; the loss of the Tenerife Open; and the Scandinavian Enterprise Open and the PLM Open were merged to create the Scandinavian Masters.

After provisionally being scheduled for 14–17 October, the Portuguese Open was moved to 21–24 March, taking the venue and dates of the Atlantic Open, which was lost from the calendar. Also before the season started, three more tournaments were removed from the schedule; the Dubai Desert Classic was cancelled due to the Gulf War, the El Bosque Open was cancelled due to lack of sponsorship, and the AGF Open was cancelled as sponsors sought to replace the event's promotion company. These changes resulted in a reduction to 34 counting tournaments for the Order of Merit.

== Schedule ==
The following table lists official events during the 1991 season.

Date	Tournament	Host country	Purse (£)	Winner (Note: The number in brackets after each winner's name is the number of European Tour events they had won up to and including that tournament. This information is only shown for European Tour members and are inclusive of the three United States-based major championships which were included on the schedule for the first time in 1998, with earlier editions having retrospectively been recognised as official tour wins.)	OWGR points	Notes
~~10 Feb~~	Dubai Desert Classic	UAE	–	Cancelled	–	
~~17 Feb~~	El Bosque Open	Spain	–	Cancelled	–	
24 Feb	Girona Open	Spain	250,000	(England) Steven Richardson (1)	24	New tournament
3 Mar	Fujitsu Mediterranean Open	France	400,000	(Wales) Ian Woosnam (17)	38	
10 Mar	Open de Baleares	Spain	275,000	(South Africa) Gavan Levenson (2)	30	
17 Mar	Open Catalonia	Spain	300,000	(Spain) José María Olazábal (10)	32	
~~24 Mar~~	Vinho Verde Atlantic Open	Portugal	–	Cancelled	–	
24 Mar	Portuguese Open	Portugal	275,000	(England) Steven Richardson (2)	16	
31 Mar	Volvo Open di Firenze	Italy	200,000	(Sweden) Anders Forsbrand (2)	16	
~~7 Apr~~	AGF Open	France	–	Cancelled	–	
14 Apr	Masters Tournament	United States	US$1,350,000	(Wales) Ian Woosnam (18)	100	Major championship (Note: Unofficial money event at the time, but retrospectively counted as an official win.)
14 Apr	Jersey European Airways Open	Jersey	200,000	(Scotland) Sam Torrance (14)	16	
21 Apr	Benson & Hedges International Open	England	400,000	(Germany) Bernhard Langer (24)	52	
28 Apr	Madrid Open	Spain	275,000	(England) Andrew Sherborne (1)	20	
5 May	Credit Lyonnais Cannes Open	France	350,000	(Northern Ireland) David Feherty (4)	24	
12 May	Peugeot Spanish Open	Spain	350,000	(Argentina) Eduardo Romero (3)	48	
19 May	Lancia Martini Italian Open	Italy	325,000	(Australia) Craig Parry (3)	42	
27 May	Volvo PGA Championship	England	500,000	(Spain) Seve Ballesteros (44)	64	Flagship event
2 Jun	Dunhill British Masters	England	450,000	(Spain) Seve Ballesteros (45)	42	
9 Jun	Murphy's Cup	England	350,000	(Zimbabwe) Tony Johnstone (3)	34	
16 Jun	Renault Belgian Open	Belgium	250,000	(Sweden) Per-Ulrik Johansson (1)	16	
16 Jun	U.S. Open	United States	US$1,300,000	(United States) Payne Stewart (n/a)	100	Major championship
23 Jun	Carroll's Irish Open	Ireland	375,000	(England) Nick Faldo (22)	48	
30 Jun	Peugeot Open de France	France	400,000	(Argentina) Eduardo Romero (4)	42	
6 Jul	Torras Monte Carlo Open	France	400,000	(Wales) Ian Woosnam (19)	44	
13 Jul	Bell's Scottish Open	Scotland	500,000	(Australia) Craig Parry (4)	56	
21 Jul	The Open Championship	England	900,000	(Australia) Ian Baker-Finch (2)	100	Major championship
28 Jul	Heineken Dutch Open	Netherlands	500,000	(United States) Payne Stewart (n/a)	44	
4 Aug	Scandinavian Masters	Sweden	600,000	(Scotland) Colin Montgomerie (2)	48	New tournament
11 Aug	European Pro-Celebrity	England	250,000	(England) Paul Broadhurst (2)	16	Pro-Am
11 Aug	PGA Championship	United States	US$1,350,000	(United States) John Daly (1)	100	Major championship
18 Aug	NM English Open	England	450,000	(England) David Gilford (1)	30	
25 Aug	Volvo German Open	Germany	525,000	(Zimbabwe) Mark McNulty (11)	30	
1 Sep	GA European Open	England	500,000	(Australia) Mike Harwood (5)	52	
8 Sep	Canon European Masters Swiss Open	Switzerland	450,000	(South Africa) Jeff Hawkes (1)	36	
15 Sep	Trophée Lancôme	France	450,000	(New Zealand) Frank Nobilo (2)	56	Limited-field event
22 Sep	Epson Grand Prix of Europe	Wales	450,000	(Spain) José María Olazábal (11)	38	Limited-field event
29 Sep	Mitsubishi Austrian Open	Austria	250,000	(England) Mark Davis (1)	16	
6 Oct	Mercedes German Masters	Germany	500,000	(Germany) Bernhard Langer (25)	50	
13 Oct	BMW International Open	Germany	400,000	(Scotland) Sandy Lyle (16)	38	
27 Oct	Volvo Masters	Spain	600,000	(Australia) Rodger Davis (6)	52	Tour Championship

=== Unofficial events ===
The following events were sanctioned by the European Tour, but did not carry official money, nor were wins official.

Date	Tournament	Host country	Purse (£)	Winner(s)	OWGR points	Notes
17 Sep	Equity & Law Challenge	England	150,000	(Scotland) Brian Marchbank	n/a	
29 Sep	Ryder Cup	United States	n/a	Team USA	n/a	Team event
13 Oct	Dunhill Cup	Scotland	US$1,700,000	Team Sweden	n/a	Team event
20 Oct	Toyota World Match Play Championship	England	500,000	(Spain) Seve Ballesteros	48	Limited-field event
3 Nov	World Cup	Italy	US$1,100,000	(Sweden) Anders Forsbrand and (Sweden) Per-Ulrik Johansson	n/a	Team event
3 Nov	World Cup Individual Trophy	Italy	US$1,100,000	(Wales) Ian Woosnam	n/a	
10 Nov	Benson & Hedges Trophy	Spain	200,000	(Sweden) Helen Alfredsson and (Sweden) Anders Forsbrand	n/a	Team event
10 Nov	Asahi Glass Four Tours World Championship	Australia	US$1,150,000	Team Europe	n/a	Team event
22 Dec	Johnnie Walker World Golf Championship	Jamaica	US$2,500,000	(United States) Fred Couples	64	Limited-field event

== Order of Merit ==
The Order of Merit was titled as the Volvo Order of Merit and was based on prize money won during the season, calculated in Pound sterling.

Position	Player	Prize money (£)
1	(Spain) Seve Ballesteros	545,353
2	(England) Steven Richardson	393,155
3	(Germany) Bernhard Langer	372,703
4	(Scotland) Colin Montgomerie	343,575
5	(Australia) Craig Parry	328,116
6	(Australia) Rodger Davis	317,441
7	(Spain) José María Olazábal	302,270
8	(Wales) Ian Woosnam	257,433
9	(England) David Gilford	249,240
10	(England) Nick Faldo	245,892

== Awards ==
Award	Winner	Ref.
Golfer of the Year	(Spain) Seve Ballesteros	
Sir Henry Cotton Rookie of the Year	(Sweden) Per-Ulrik Johansson	

== See also ==
- 1991 Challenge Tour
