= Girona Open =

Tournament information
- Location: Girona, Catalonia, Spain
- Established: 1991
- Course: Club de Golf Pals
- Par: 72
- Tour: European Tour
- Format: Stroke play
- Prize fund: £250,000
- Month played: February
- Final year: 1991

Tournament record score
- Aggregate: 272 Steven Richardson
- To par: −16 as above

Final champion
- (England) Steven Richardson
- Location in Catalonia

The Girona Open was a golf tournament on the European Tour in 1991. It was held at Golf Platja de Pals in Girona, Catalonia, Spain, and was won by England's Steven Richardson.

== Winners ==
Year	Winner	Score	To par	Margin of victory	Runner-up
1991	(England) Steven Richardson	272	−16	2 strokes	(Spain) Miguel Ángel Jiménez
