= Gus Elson =

English cricketer

Personal information
- Full name: Geoffrey Elson
- Born: 19 March 1913; Coventry, Warwickshire, England
- Died: 30 December 1999 (aged 86); Rugby, Warwickshire, England
- Nickname: Gus
- Batting: Left-handed
- Bowling: Slow left-arm orthodox

Domestic team information
- Years: Team
- 1947: Warwickshire

Career statistics
| Competition | First-class |
|---|---|
| Matches | 1 |
| Runs scored | 7 |
| Batting average | 7.00 |
| 100s/50s | 0/0 |
| Top score | 4 |
| Balls bowled | 312 |
| Wickets | 1 |
| Bowling average | 116.00 |
| 5 wickets in innings | 0 |
| 10 wickets in match | 0 |
| Best bowling | 1/99 |
| Catches/stumpings | 0/– |
- Source: Cricinfo, 18 December 2011

Geoffrey Elson (19 March 1913 – 30 December 1999) was an English cricketer. Elson was a left-handed batsman who bowled slow left-arm orthodox. He was born at Coventry, Warwickshire and educated at Rydal Penrhos. He was more commonly known by his nickname Gus.

Elson made a first-class appearance for Warwickshire against Essex in the 1947 County Championship at Courtaulds Ground, Coventry. Elson ended Warwickshire's first-innings unbeaten on 3, with Warwickshire making a total of 320 all out. In Essex's first-innings, he took the wicket of Frank Vigar, finishing with figures of 1/99 from 44 overs as Essex compiled 493. Warwickshire made 292 in their second-innings, with Elson scoring 4 runs before being dismissed by Peter Smith. He bowled eight wicketless overs in Essex's second-innings, with Essex securing a 6 wicket victory.

He died at Rugby, Warwickshire on 30 December 1999. He was the father of professional golfer Pip Elson.
