= Derrick Cooper =

English golfer (born 1955)

Personal information
- Full name: Derrick Cooper
- Nationality: England
- Born: 5 May 1955 (age 71)
- Height: 1.83 m (6 ft 0 in)
- Weight: 95 kg (209 lb; 15.0 st)

Career
- Sport: Golf
- Turned professional: 1972
- Former tour: European Tour
- Professional wins: 2
- Highest ranking: 95 (31 December 1989)

Number of wins by tour
- European Tour: 1
- Other: 2

Best results in major championships
- Masters Tournament: DNP
- PGA Championship: DNP
- U.S. Open: DNP
- The Open Championship: T19: 1989

Derrick Cooper (born 5 May 1955) is an English professional golfer.

== Professional career ==
In 1972, Cooper turned professional. It took him some time to establish himself on the European Tour, but he held a tour card for sixteen consecutive seasons from 1984 and made the top-100 on the European Tour Order of Merit a total of 15 times, with a best ranking of 19th in 1989. He won his sole European Tour title at the 1988 Cepsa Madrid Open.

Late in his career, Cooper was a member of the PGA European Tour organisation's Board of Directors for seven years starting in 1998. In 2000, he also became a European Seniors Tour tournament referee.

== Professional wins (3) ==
=== European Tour wins (1) ===
No.	Date	Tournament	Winning score	Margin of victory	Runners-up
1	24 Apr 1988	Cepsa Madrid Open	−13 (70-68-69-68=275)	1 stroke	(Spain) Miguel Ángel Martín, (Spain) Manuel Piñero

=== Other wins (2) ===
- 1983 Northern Open
- 1984 PGA Fourball Championship (with Denis Durnian, tied with Philip Posnett & Peter Hanna)

== Results in major championships ==
Tournament	1980	1981	1982	1983	1984	1985	1986	1987	1988	1989
The Open Championship	T51					CUT	T21	T40	CUT	T19

Tournament	1990	1991	1992	1993	1994	1995	1996	1997	1998	1999
The Open Championship	T39					T58			CUT	T72

Note: Cooper only played in The Open Championship.

Did not play

CUT = missed the half-way cut
"T" indicates a tie for a place

== Team appearances ==
- Europcar Cup (representing England): 1988
