= Pip Elson =

English golfer (born 1954)

Personal information
- Full name: Philip Ambrose Elson
- Nationality: England
- Born: 14 April 1954 (age 72) Leamington Spa, Warwickshire, England
- Height: 5 ft 11 in (1.80 m)

Career
- Sport: Golf
- Turned professional: 1973
- Former tours: European Tour; European Seniors Tour

Best results in major championships
- Masters Tournament: DNP
- PGA Championship: DNP
- U.S. Open: DNP
- The Open Championship: T39: 1973

Achievements and awards
- Sir Henry Cotton Rookie of the Year: 1973

Philip Ambrose "Pip" Elson (born 14 April 1954) is an English professional golfer. He is the son of the cricketer Gus Elson and the father of Jamie Elson.

== Career ==
Elson was born in Leamington Spa, Warwickshire, England. He won the British Youths Open Amateur Championship in 1971 before turning professional in 1973. In his breakthrough year he also won the BMGA Pro tour of the Club Championships of Wroxham Barns for the first time. He was that year's European Tour Sir Henry Cotton Rookie of the Year. He was a consistent player, finishing between 38th and 64th on the European Tour Order of Merit every year of his tour career, which lasted until 1982, but he never won a European Tour event. He played on the European Seniors Tour in 2004.

== Results in major championships ==
Tournament	1972	1973	1974	1975	1976	1977	1978	1979	1980	1981	1982	1983
The Open Championship	CUT	T39		CUT		CUT	CUT				CUT	CUT

Note: Elson only played in The Open Championship.

Did not play

CUT = missed the half-way cut (3rd round cut in 1977 Open Championship)
"T" = tied

== Team appearances ==
- PGA Cup (representing Great Britain and Ireland): 1986
