= Madrid Open (golf) =

Open de Madrid Valle Romano
Tournament information
- Location: Madrid, Spain
- Established: 1968
- Course: Real Sociedad Hípica Española Club de Campo
- Par: 72
- Length: 7,162 yards (6,549 m)
- Tour: European Tour
- Format: Stroke play
- Prize fund: €900,000
- Month played: October
- Final year: 2007

Tournament record score
- Aggregate: 261 Raphaël Jacquelin (2005)
- To par: −23 as above

Final champion
- (Denmark) Mads Vibe-Hastrup
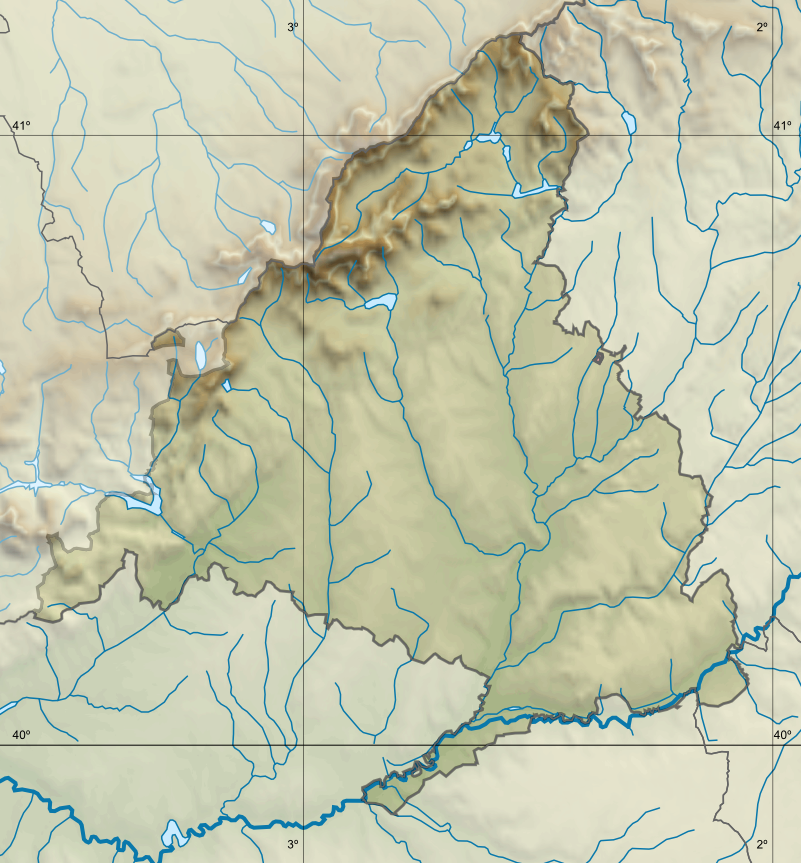
- Location in Spain Location in the Community of Madrid

The Madrid Open was an annual men's golf tournament which was held in and around the Spanish capital Madrid from 1968 to 2007, apart from a seven-year gap from 1994 to 2000.

It was an official money event on the European Tour since the tour's first official season in 1972 until 2007. Spain was the only country other than the UK which hosted more than one event in 1972, the other tournament in the country being the Spanish Open.

The tournament has had several sponsored names over the years. In 2006 the tournament moved to a new slot and was played the same September week as the 16-man HSBC World Match Play Championship. The 2006 prize fund was €1 million, which is one of the smaller purses on the European Tour. In 2007, the event moved to October, but it was once again be an alternate event to the HSBC World Match Play Championship, which was also rescheduled. It was dropped from the 2008 schedule, with a new tournament named the Madrid Masters taking its place.

== Winners ==
Year	Winner	Score	To par	Margin of victory	Runner(s)-up	Purse (€)	Winner's share (€)	Ref.
Open de Madrid Valle Romano
2007	(Denmark) Mads Vibe-Hastrup	272	−16	3 strokes	(Spain) Alejandro Cañizares	900,000	150,000	
XXXII Banco Madrid Valle Romano Open de Madrid Golf Masters
2006	(England) Ian Poulter	266	−22	5 strokes	(Spain) Ignacio Garrido	1,008,955	166,660	
Open de Madrid
2005	(France) Raphaël Jacquelin	261	−23	3 strokes	(Scotland) Paul Lawrie	1,005,982	166,660	
2004	(South Africa) Richard Sterne	266	−18	1 stroke	(Denmark) Anders Hansen	1,013,392	166,660	
Telefónica Open de Madrid
2003	(Argentina) Ricardo González	270	−14	1 stroke	(England) Paul Casey (Republic of Ireland) Pádraig Harrington (Australia) Nick O'Hern (Sweden) Mårten Olander	1,400,000	233,330	
2002	(Denmark) Steen Tinning	265	−19	1 stroke	(Scotland) Andrew Coltart (England) Brian Davis (Australia) Adam Scott	1,416,716	233,330	
2001	(South Africa) Retief Goosen	264	−20	Playoff	(England) Steve Webster	1,404,197	233,330	
Madrid Open
1995−2000: No tournament
1994	Cancelled							
1993	(Republic of Ireland) Des Smyth	272	−16	3 strokes	(Spain) Domingo Hospital (Spain) José Rivero (England) Mark Roe (South Africa) Wayne Westner	560,000	93,324	
Iberia Madrid Open
1992	(Northern Ireland) David Feherty	272	−16	4 strokes	(Zimbabwe) Mark McNulty	568,274	93,324	
Madrid Open
1991	(England) Andrew Sherborne	272	−16	1 stroke	(Spain) Miguel Ángel Martín	386,151	64,155	
Cepsa Madrid Open
1990	(West Germany) Bernhard Langer	270	−18	1 stroke	(Australia) Rodger Davis	385,000	64,155	
1989	(Spain) Seve Ballesteros (3)	272	−16	1 stroke	(England) Howard Clark	317,734	52,500	
1988	(England) Derrick Cooper	275	−13	1 stroke	(Spain) Miguel Ángel Martín (Spain) Manuel Piñero	282,419	46,662	
1987	(Wales) Ian Woosnam	269	−19	3 strokes	(Australia) Wayne Grady	231,000	38,500	
1986	(England) Howard Clark (2)	274	−14	1 stroke	(Spain) Seve Ballesteros	168,333	28,000	
1985	(Spain) Manuel Piñero (2)	278	−10	Playoff	(Spain) José María Cañizares	136,989	22,670	
1984	(England) Howard Clark	274	−14	3 strokes	(Spain) José María Cañizares	118,949	19,864	
1983	(Scotland) Sandy Lyle	285	−3	2 strokes	(England) Gordon J. Brand	78,508	12,959	
1982	(Spain) Seve Ballesteros (2)	273	−15	1 stroke	(Spain) José María Cañizares	60,245	10,006	
Madrid Open
1981	(Spain) Manuel Piñero	279	−9	5 strokes	(Republic of Ireland) Des Smyth	48,124	8,021	
1980	(Spain) Seve Ballesteros	270	−18	3 strokes	(Spain) Manuel Piñero	42,579	7,165	
1979	(South Africa) Simon Hobday	285	−3	2 strokes	(Spain) Francisco Abreu (England) Gordon J. Brand (South Africa) Tienie Britz	45,509	7,721	
1978	(England) Howard Clark	282	−6	2 strokes	(Spain) José María Cañizares	27,551	5,695	
1977	(Spain) Antonio Garrido	278	−10	3 strokes	(Spain) Francisco Abreu	29,113	4,619	
1976	(Spain) Francisco Abreu	275	−13	9 strokes	(Spain) Antonio Garrido	25,445	4,053	
1975	(Australia) Bob Shearer	135	−9	3 strokes	(South Africa) Dale Hayes (Scotland) Norman Wood	23,631	3,805	
1974	(Spain) Manuel Piñero	283	−5	Playoff	(Spain) Valentín Barrios	21,184	3,500	
1973	(Spain) Germán Garrido (2)	287	−1	1 stroke	(Spain) Emilio Perera	18,522	3,374	
1972	(Republic of Ireland) Jimmy Kinsella	283	−5	1 stroke	(Spain) José María Cañizares			
1971	(Spain) Valentín Barrios	285	−3	2 strokes	(Spain) Antonio Garrido (Spain) Tomas Lopez			
1970	(Spain) Manuel Cabrera	286	−2	2 strokes	(England) Neil Coles			
1969	(Spain) Ramón Sota	278	−10	8 strokes		3,750		
1968	(Spain) Germán Garrido	279	−9					
