= Steven Richardson (golfer) =

English golfer (born 1966)

Personal information
- Full name: Steven John Richardson
- Nationality: England
- Born: 24 July 1966 (age 60) Windsor, Berkshire, England
- Height: 6 ft 1 in (1.85 m)
- Weight: 210 lb (95 kg; 15 st)

Career
- Sport: Golf
- Turned professional: 1989
- Former tour: European Tour
- Professional wins: 3
- Highest ranking: 30 (26 January 1992)

Number of wins by tour
- European Tour: 3

Best results in major championships
- Masters Tournament: T31: 1992
- PGA Championship: T5: 1991
- U.S. Open: T58: 1994
- The Open Championship: T32: 1991

Steven John Richardson (born 24 July 1966) is an English professional golfer.

== Career ==
Richardson was born in Windsor, Berkshire. He won the English Amateur in 1989 and turned professional later that year. He made a strong start to his professional career, finishing in 29th place on the European Tour Order of Merit in his rookie season. The following year he won the Girona Open and the Portuguese Open, tied for 5th in the USPGA Championship, and finished second on the Order of Merit to Seve Ballesteros. He also ended the 1992 and 1993 seasons inside the top 20 on the money list, while picking up his third career victory in the Mercedes German Masters.

However, Richardson's form began to decline, as he slipped outside the top 50 on the European Tour Order of Merit in 1994. He fell outside the top 100 two years later, and had to visit qualifying school in 1998, 1999 and 2000 to regain his tour card. He finally lost his place on the European Tour at the end of 2001 having failed to come through the qualifying school by a single shot. He revisited qualifying the following year, but was again unsuccessful.

Richardson was a member of Europe's losing Ryder Cup team in 1991. He won two points in partnership with Mark James but lost his singles match to Corey Pavin. In 1992, he was a member of the winning English team at the Alfred Dunhill Cup.

== Amateur wins ==
- 1989 English Amateur

== Professional wins (3) ==
=== European Tour wins (3) ===
No.	Date	Tournament	Winning score	Margin of victory	Runner-up
1	24 Feb 1991	Girona Open	−16 (71-64-67-70=272)	2 strokes	(Spain) Miguel Ángel Jiménez
2	24 Mar 1991	Portuguese Open	−5 (71-67-71-74=283)	3 strokes	(Argentina) Vicente Fernández
3	3 Oct 1993	Mercedes German Masters	−17 (67-66-70-68=271)	2 strokes	(Sweden) Robert Karlsson

== Playoff record ==
Challenge Tour playoff record (0–1)

No.	Year	Tournament	Opponent	Result
1	1990	Barnham Broom Challenge	(Scotland) Colin Brooks	Lost to birdie on fourth extra hole

== Results in major championships ==
Tournament	1991	1992	1993	1994
Masters Tournament		T31		
U.S. Open		CUT		T58
The Open Championship	T32	T39	CUT	CUT
PGA Championship	T5	T48		

Top 10
Did not play

CUT = missed the half-way cut
"T" = tied

=== Summary ===
Tournament	Wins	2nd	3rd	Top-5	Top-10	Top-25	Events	Cuts made
Masters Tournament	0	0	0	0	0	0	1	1
U.S. Open	0	0	0	0	0	0	2	1
The Open Championship	0	0	0	0	0	0	4	2
PGA Championship	0	0	0	1	1	1	2	2
Totals	0	0	0	1	1	1	9	6

- Most consecutive cuts made – 3 (1991 Open Championship – 1992 Masters)
- Longest streak of top-10s – 1

== Team appearances ==
Amateur

- EGA Trophy (representing Great Britain & Ireland): 1986 (winners)
- Men's Home Internationals (representing England): 1986, 1987, 1988 (winners)

Professional

- Dunhill Cup (representing England): 1991, 1992 (winners)
- Four Tours World Championship (representing Europe): 1991 (winners)
- Ryder Cup (representing Europe): 1991
- World Cup (representing England): 1991, 1992
