= 1991 Ryder Cup =

1991 edition of the Ryder Cup

29th Ryder Cup Matches
- Dates: September 27–29, 1991
- Venue: Kiawah Island Golf Resort; The Ocean Course
- Location: Kiawah Island, South Carolina
- Captains: Dave Stockton (USA); Bernard Gallacher (Europe)
(United States)	14 1/2	13 1/2	(Europe)
- United States wins the Ryder Cup

Location map
- Location within South Carolina

The 29th Ryder Cup Matches were held September 27–29, 1991, on The Ocean Course at Kiawah Island Golf Resort in Kiawah Island, South Carolina, southwest of Charleston.

The United States team won the competition by 14 1/2 to 13 1/2 points, winning back the Cup on the 18th hole of the final match. Bernhard Langer missed a six-foot (1.8 m) par putt which would have won his match and clinched a 14-all tie and retained the Ryder Cup for Europe. It was the first win for the U.S. since 1983, after consecutive losses to Europe in 1985 and 1987 and a tie in 1989. Due to the fierce competition, gamesmanship and general over-exuberance of the U.S. Team and their fans, these Ryder Cup Matches became known as the "War on the Shore."

The event was originally slated for PGA West, but was moved in 1989 to accommodate television coverage in both the United States and Europe.

The Ocean Course later hosted the PGA Championship in 2012 and 2021.

== Format ==
The Ryder Cup is a match play event, with each match worth one point. The competition format in 1991 was as follows:

- Day 1 (Friday) — 4 foursome (alternate shot) matches in a morning session and 4 four-ball (better ball) matches in an afternoon session
- Day 2 (Saturday) — 4 foursome matches in a morning session and 4 four-ball matches in an afternoon session
- Day 3 (Sunday) — 12 singles matches

With a total of 28 points, 14 1/2 points were required to win the Cup, and 14 points were required for the defending champion to retain the Cup. All matches were played to a maximum of 18 holes.

== Teams ==
Team USA
Name	Age	Points rank	World ranking	Previous Ryder Cups	Matches	W–L–H	Winning percentage
Dave Stockton	49	Non-playing captain
Fred Couples	31	1	7	1	2	0–2–0	0.00
Payne Stewart	34	2	6	2	8	3–5–0	37.50
Lanny Wadkins	41	3	13	6	25	15–9–1	62.00
Hale Irwin	46	4	12	4	16	11–4–1	71.88
Paul Azinger	31	5	8	1	4	3–1–0	75.00
Corey Pavin	31	6	16	0	Rookie
Mark O'Meara	34	7	15	2	5	1–4–0	20.00
Mark Calcavecchia	31	8=	24	2	7	3–4–0	42.86
Wayne Levi	39	8=	38	0	Rookie
Steve Pate	30	10	30	0	Rookie
Chip Beck	35	13	21	1	4	3–0–1	87.50
Raymond Floyd	49	23	39	6	23	7–13–3	36.96

Captains picks are shown in yellow. The world rankings and records are at the start of the 1991 Ryder Cup.

The selection process for the European team remained the same as used since 1985, with nine players chosen from the 1991 European Tour money list at the conclusion of the German Open on August 25 and the remaining three team members being chosen immediately afterwards by the team captain, Bernard Gallacher. Gallacher had announced before the final event that he would choose Nick Faldo as one of his picks. He also announced that he would select José María Olazábal, who was then in the 9th and final automatic spot, even if he dropped out of the top nine. At the time Olazábal and Faldo were second and third in the world rankings. Olazábal had just won The International on the PGA Tour. Eamonn Darcy, in 7th place in the points list, chose to miss the German Open. However, with David Gilford earning £4,320 in prize money, Sam Torrance tying for 3rd place and Paul Broadhurst losing a playoff, Darcy dropped to 10th place in the final list, £58.26 behind Gilford. Olazábal dropped to 11th place in the points list but had been assured of selection anyway. Gallacher chose Mark James as his third choice in preference to Darcy.

Team Europe
Name	Age	Points rank	World ranking	Previous Ryder Cups	Matches	W–L–H	Winning percentage
(Scotland) Bernard Gallacher	42	Non-playing captain
(Spain) Seve Ballesteros	34	1	5	5	25	13–8–4	60.00
(Scotland) Colin Montgomerie	28	2	35	0	Rookie
(England) Steven Richardson	25	3	36	0	Rookie
(Wales) Ian Woosnam	33	4	1	4	17	7–7–3	50.00
(Scotland) Sam Torrance	38	5	41	5	18	4–10–4	33.33
(Germany) Bernhard Langer	34	6	9	5	22	10–8–4	54.55
(England) Paul Broadhurst	26	7	93	0	Rookie
(Northern Ireland) David Feherty	33	8	44	0	Rookie
(England) David Gilford	26	9	99	0	Rookie
(Spain) José María Olazábal	25	11	2	2	10	7–2–1	75.00
(England) Nick Faldo	34	15	3	7	27	16–9–2	62.96
(England) Mark James	37	22	45	4	14	5–8–1	39.29

Captains picks are shown in yellow. The world rankings and records are at the start of the 1991 Ryder Cup.

== Friday's matches ==
=== Morning foursomes ===
	Results
Ballesteros/Olazábal	(Europe) 2 & 1	Azinger/Beck
Langer/James	(United States) 2 & 1	Floyd/Couples
Gilford/Montgomerie	(United States) 4 & 2	Wadkins/Irwin
Faldo/Woosnam	(United States) 1 up	Stewart/Calcavecchia
1	Session	3
1	Overall	3

=== Afternoon four-ball ===
	Results
Torrance/Feherty	halved	Wadkins/O'Meara
Ballesteros/Olazábal	(Europe) 2 & 1	Azinger/Beck
Richardson/James	(Europe) 5 & 4	Pavin/Calcavecchia
Faldo/Woosnam	(United States) 5 & 3	Floyd/Couples
2 1/2	Session	1 1/2
3 1/2	Overall	4 1/2

== Saturday's matches ==
=== Morning foursomes ===
	Results
Feherty/Torrance	(United States) 4 & 2	Irwin/Wadkins
James/Richardson	(United States) 1 up	Calcavecchia/Stewart
Faldo/Gilford	(United States) 7 & 6	Azinger/O'Meara
Ballesteros/Olazábal	(Europe) 3 & 2	Couples/Floyd
1	Session	3
4 1/2	Overall	7 1/2

=== Afternoon four-ball ===
	Results
Woosnam/Broadhurst	(Europe) 2 & 1	Azinger/Irwin
Langer/Montgomerie	(Europe) 2 & 1	Pavin/Pate
James/Richardson	(Europe) 3 & 1	Wadkins/Levi
Ballesteros/Olazábal	halved	Stewart/Couples
3 1/2	Session	1/2
8	Overall	8

== Sunday's singles matches ==
	Results
Nick Faldo	(Europe) 2 up	Raymond Floyd
David Feherty	(Europe) 2 & 1	Payne Stewart
Colin Montgomerie	halved	Mark Calcavecchia
José María Olazábal	(United States) 2 up	Paul Azinger
Steven Richardson	(United States) 2 & 1	Corey Pavin
Seve Ballesteros	(Europe) 3 & 2	Wayne Levi
Ian Woosnam	(United States) 3 & 1	Chip Beck
Paul Broadhurst	(Europe) 3 & 1	Mark O'Meara
Sam Torrance	(United States) 3 & 2	Fred Couples
Mark James	(United States) 3 & 2	Lanny Wadkins
Bernhard Langer	halved	Hale Irwin
David Gilford	halved	Steve Pate
5 1/2	Session	6 1/2
13 1/2	Overall	14 1/2

== Individual player records ==
Each entry refers to the win–loss–half record of the player.

=== United States ===
Player	Points	Overall	Singles	Foursomes	Fourballs
Paul Azinger	2	2–3–0	1–0–0	1–1–0	0–2–0
Chip Beck	1	1–2–0	1–0–0	0–1–0	0–1–0
Mark Calcavecchia	2.5	2–1–1	0–0–1	2–0–0	0–1–0
Fred Couples	3.5	3–1–1	1–0–0	1–1–0	1–0–1
Raymond Floyd	2	2–2–0	0–1–0	1–1–0	1–0–0
Hale Irwin	2.5	2–1–1	0–0–1	2–0–0	0–1–0
Wayne Levi	0	0–2–0	0–1–0	0–0–0	0–1–0
Mark O'Meara	1.5	1–1–1	0–1–0	1–0–0	0–0–1
Steve Pate	0.5	0–1–1	0–0–1	0–0–0	0–1–0
Corey Pavin	1	1–2–0	1–0–0	0–0–0	0–2–0
Payne Stewart	2.5	2–1–1	0–1–0	2–0–0	0–0–1
Lanny Wadkins	3.5	3–1–1	1–0–0	2–0–0	0–1–1

=== Europe ===
Player	Points	Overall	Singles	Foursomes	Fourballs
Seve Ballesteros	4.5	4–0–1	1–0–0	2–0–0	1–0–1
Paul Broadhurst	2	2–0–0	1–0–0	0–0–0	1–0–0
Nick Faldo	1	1–3–0	1–0–0	0–2–0	0–1–0
David Feherty	1.5	1–1–1	1–0–0	0–1–0	0–0–1
David Gilford	0.5	0–2–1	0–0–1	0–2–0	0–0–0
Mark James	2	2–3–0	0–1–0	0–2–0	2–0–0
Bernhard Langer	1.5	1–1–1	0–0–1	0–1–0	1–0–0
Colin Montgomerie	1.5	1–1–1	0–0–1	0–1–0	1–0–0
José María Olazábal	3.5	3–1–1	0–1–0	2–0–0	1–0–1
Steven Richardson	2	2–2–0	0–1–0	0–1–0	2–0–0
Sam Torrance	0.5	0–2–1	0–1–0	0–1–0	0–0–1
Ian Woosnam	1	1–3–0	0–1–0	0–1–0	1–1–0

== Steve Pate injury controversy ==
On the eve of the games, Steve Pate and some other members of the U.S. team were involved in a minor caravan crash causing Pate to bruise his ribs and need hospital treatment. Much was discussed by the U.S. captain to either replace him at the last minute or carry on as planned. The decision was taken to allow Pate to participate in the games causing him to sit out the first three sessions of play. The only session he played in was a four-ball on Saturday afternoon, losing to Bernhard Langer and Colin Montgomerie. Prior to the first singles tee off on Sunday the U.S. team announced that Steve Pate was unable to play in the singles due to his earlier sustained injury. As a result, the match he was due to contend with David Gilford was automatically halved causing Gilford to miss out his singles match.

This brought heavy criticism from the general media and the European team feeling a sense of bad sportsmanship on behalf of the Americans. Especially considering U.S. captain Dave Stockton had chosen to play Pate in an earlier match thus risking causing further unnecessary injury to the player. In post-match interviews serious questions were asked of the American's reasoning and tactics behind claiming half a point for one of their weaker players.

== Ballesteros/Azinger and Floyd controversies ==
Ballesteros and Azinger had previously locked horns in 1989 when Ballesteros tried to have a scuffed ball taken out of play which Azinger disagreed with.

The bad blood escalated at Kiawah Island when on the morning of the Friday foursomes with Ballesteros partnering José María Olazábal against Paul Azinger and Chip Beck the Europeans noticed the Americans had changed the compression of the ball on the 7th tee which is in violation of the one-ball rule. Ballesteros accused his opponents of doing this at least three times since the start of the match. On speaking with the referee at first Azinger flatly denied it. However once it had become apparent to the Americans that they were not called up on the violation at the time of incident therefore could no longer be penalized by loss of hole they admitted to switching their ball. This incident was the stem of accusations of the U.S. side of repeated gamesmanship, bad sportsmanship and ill tactics in many future matches to come.

On the morning of the Saturday foursomes with Ballesteros partnering José María Olazábal against Raymond Floyd and Fred Couples, Ballesteros developed a small cough. After noise was coincidentally made during swings made by the United States Team on the first 2 holes, Floyd approached Ballesteros with a severe warning that he was "better than you (Ballesteros) could ever be at this" and that if Ballesteros did not stop he would reciprocate with force.

Since the mid-1980s, the European team had dominated the event including wins in 1985, 1987 and retaining the cup in 1989. With exception to 1993, the European team continued to dominate until ill feelings between the two sides came to a head in an explosive match at Brookline in 1999 where the U.S. side and their fans were again accused of having the mindset of "anything to win" going against the spirit of how the matches were intended to be played.
