= 1976 European Tour =

Golf tour season

1976 European Tour season
- Duration: 8 April 1976 – 24 October 1976
- Number of official events: 21
- Most wins: (Italy) Baldovino Dassù (2) (Scotland) Sam Torrance (2)
- Order of Merit: (Spain) Seve Ballesteros
- Sir Henry Cotton Rookie of the Year: (England) Mark James

The 1976 European Tour, titled as the 1976 PGA Tournament Players' Division, was the fifth season of the European Tour, the main professional golf tour in Europe since its inaugural season in 1972.

== Changes for 1976 ==
The season was made up of 21 tournaments counting for the Order of Merit, and some non-counting tournaments that later became known as "Approved Special Events". The schedule included the major national opens around Europe, with the other tournaments mostly held in England and Scotland.

There were several changes from the previous season, with the addition of the Greater Manchester Open and the Uniroyal International; along with non-counting events the Cacharel World Under-25 Championship and the Lancome Trophy; and the Benson & Hedges Festival being retitled as the Benson & Hedges International Open.

== Schedule ==
The following table lists official events during the 1976 season.

Date	Tournament	Host country	Purse (£)	Winner (Note: The number in brackets after each winner's name is the number of European Tour events they had won up to and including that tournament. This information is only shown for European Tour members and are inclusive of the three United States-based major championships which were included on the schedule for the first time in 1998, with earlier editions having retrospectively been recognised as official tour wins.)	Notes
11 Apr	Masters Tournament	United States	US$254,852	(United States) Raymond Floyd (n/a)	Major championship (Note: Unofficial money event at the time, but retrospectively counted as an official win.)
17 Apr	Portuguese Open	Portugal	15,000	(Spain) Salvador Balbuena (1)	
24 Apr	Spanish Open	Spain	30,525	(Northern Ireland) Eddie Polland (3)	
1 May	Madrid Open	Spain	18,500	(Spain) Francisco Abreu (2)	
9 May	French Open	France	22,200	(South Africa) Vincent Tshabalala (1)	
15 May	Piccadilly Medal	England	40,000	(Scotland) Sam Torrance (1)	
31 May	Penfold PGA Championship	England	50,000	(England) Neil Coles (5)	
6 Jun	Kerrygold International Classic	Ireland	12,500	(England) Tony Jacklin (5)	
12 Jun	Martini International	England	15,000	(Scotland) Sam Torrance (2)	
20 Jun	Greater Manchester Open	England	12,000	(Republic of Ireland) John O'Leary (1)	New to European Tour
20 Jun	U.S. Open	United States	US$259,000	(United States) Jerry Pate (n/a)	Major championship
26 Jun	Uniroyal International	England	25,000	(England) Tommy Horton (3)	New tournament
10 Jul	The Open Championship	England	75,000	(United States) Johnny Miller (n/a)	Major championship
18 Jul	Scandinavian Enterprise Open	Sweden	38,600	(South Africa) Hugh Baiocchi (3)	
25 Jul	Swiss Open	Switzerland	31,300	(Spain) Manuel Piñero (2)	
8 Aug	Dutch Open	Netherlands	26,205	(Spain) Seve Ballesteros (1)	
15 Aug	German Open	West Germany	23,100	(Rhodesia) Simon Hobday (1)	
15 Aug	PGA Championship	United States	US$250,000	(United States) Dave Stockton (n/a)	Major championship
18 Aug	Double Diamond Individual Championship	Scotland	10,000	(New Zealand) Simon Owen (2)	
29 Aug	Carroll's Irish Open	Ireland	35,000	(United States) Ben Crenshaw (n/a)	
5 Sep	Sun Alliance Match Play Championship	England	20,000	(Scotland) Brian Barnes (4)	
25 Sep	Benson & Hedges International Open	England	40,000	(Australia) Graham Marsh (4)	
2 Oct	Dunlop Masters	Wales	30,000	(Italy) Baldovino Dassù (1)	
24 Oct	Italian Open	Italy	27,000	(Italy) Baldovino Dassù (2)	

=== Unofficial events ===
The following events were sanctioned by the European Tour, but did not carry official money, nor were wins official.

Date	Tournament	Host country	Purse (£)	Winner(s)	Notes
22 May	Sumrie-Bournemouth Better-Ball	England	12,000	(Republic of Ireland) Eamonn Darcy and (Republic of Ireland) Christy O'Connor Jnr	Team event
5 Jun	Cacharel World Under-25 Championship	France	n/a	(Republic of Ireland) Eamonn Darcy	New tournament
3 Jul	Phillip Morris International	France	n/a	Team USA	Team event
21 Aug	Double Diamond International	Scotland	25,000	Team England	Team event
18 Sep; ~~17 Jul~~	T.P.D. Under-25 Championship	England	5,000	(England) Howard Clark	
9 Oct	Piccadilly World Match Play Championship	England	75,000	(Australia) David Graham	Limited-field event
17 Oct	Trophée Lancôme	France	US$40,000	(Spain) Seve Ballesteros	New to European Tour
12 Dec	World Cup	United States	US$4,200	(Spain) Seve Ballesteros and (Spain) Manuel Piñero	Team event
12 Dec	World Cup Individual Trophy	United States	US$2,100	(Mexico) Ernesto Pérez Acosta	

== Order of Merit ==
The Order of Merit was based on tournament results during the season, calculated using a points-based system.

Position	Player	Points	Prize money (£)
1	(Spain) Seve Ballesteros	21,495	39,504
2	(Republic of Ireland) Eamonn Darcy	16,741	25,027
3	(Scotland) Sam Torrance	16,627	20,917
4	(Spain) Manuel Piñero	16,474	19,946
5	(England) Tommy Horton	16,185	22,781
6	(England) Neil Coles	15,976	20,543
7	(England) Martin Foster	12,669	17,436
8	(Scotland) Brian Barnes	12,256	23,350
9	(Italy) Baldovino Dassù	11,961	13,405
10	(Rhodesia) Simon Hobday	11,893	15,196

== Awards ==
Award	Winner	Ref.
Sir Henry Cotton Rookie of the Year	(England) Mark James	
