= Vin Baker (golfer) =

South African golfer (died 1990)

Personal information
- Full name: Vincent E. R. Baker
- Nationality: South Africa
- Died: July 1990 Durban, South Africa

Career
- Sport: Golf
- Status: Professional
- Former tours: South African Tour; European Tour
- Professional wins: 2

Number of wins by tour
- European Tour: 1
- Sunshine Tour: 1

Best results in major championships
- Masters Tournament: DNP
- PGA Championship: DNP
- U.S. Open: DNP
- The Open Championship: T37: 1973

Vincent E. R. Baker (died July 1990) was a South African professional golfer. He won the 1973 Benson & Hedges Festival of Golf on the European Tour.

== Professional career ==
Baker played some tournaments in Britain in 1970. He qualified for the Open Championship through final qualifying at Carnoustie but missed the cut in the Championship itself at St Andrews. From its formation in 1972 until 1979, Baker was a regular competitor in European Tour events. He won once, in the 1973 Benson & Hedges Festival of Golf. Trailing by 5 shots after three rounds, Baker scored a final round 64 to win by 2 strokes from Dale Hayes. He was twice a runner-up, in the 1973 Scandinavian Enterprise Open and in the 1978 Italian Open. In addition to his 1970 appearance, Baker played in five further Open Championships between 1973 and 1978, making the cut twice. His best finish was in 1973 when he was tied for 37th place.

Baker won the ICL Transvaal Open in December 1974, beating Andries Oosthuizen in a sudden-death playoff. He was also runner-up in a number of important South African tournaments including the South African Open in early 1973, the South African PGA Championship in late 1973 and the South African Masters in 1975.

== Murder ==
In July 1990, Baker was stabbed to death in a carjacking by three teenagers near Durban.

== Professional wins (2) ==
=== European Tour wins (1) ===
No.	Date	Tournament	Winning score	Margin of victory	Runner-up
1	18 Aug 1973	Benson & Hedges Festival of Golf	−12 (73-68-71-64=276)	2 strokes	(South Africa) Dale Hayes

=== Southern Africa Tour wins (1) ===
No.	Date	Tournament	Winning score	Margin of victory	Runner-up
1	14 Dec 1974	ICL Transvaal Open	−8 (72-68-71-69=280)	Playoff	(South Africa) Andries Oosthuizen

Southern Africa Tour playoff record (1–0)

No.	Year	Tournament	Opponent	Result
1	1974	ICL Transvaal Open	(South Africa) Andries Oosthuizen	Won with birdie on first extra hole

== Results in major championships ==
Tournament	1970	1971	1972	1973	1974	1975	1976	1977	1978
The Open Championship	CUT			T37	CUT	CUT		T62	CUT

Note: Baker only played in The Open Championship.

Did not play

CUT = missed the half-way cut (3rd round cut in 1975 and 1978 Open Championships)

== Team appearances ==
- Double Diamond International (representing the Rest of the World): 1972
