= Uniroyal International Championship =

Tournament information
- Location: Rickmansworth, England
- Established: 1976
- Course: Moor Park Golf Club
- Par: 72
- Tour: European Tour
- Format: Stroke play
- Prize fund: £30,000
- Month played: June
- Final year: 1977

Tournament record score
- Aggregate: 276 Seve Ballesteros (1977); 276 Nick Faldo (1977)
- To par: −12 as above

Final champion
- (Spain) Seve Ballesteros

Location map
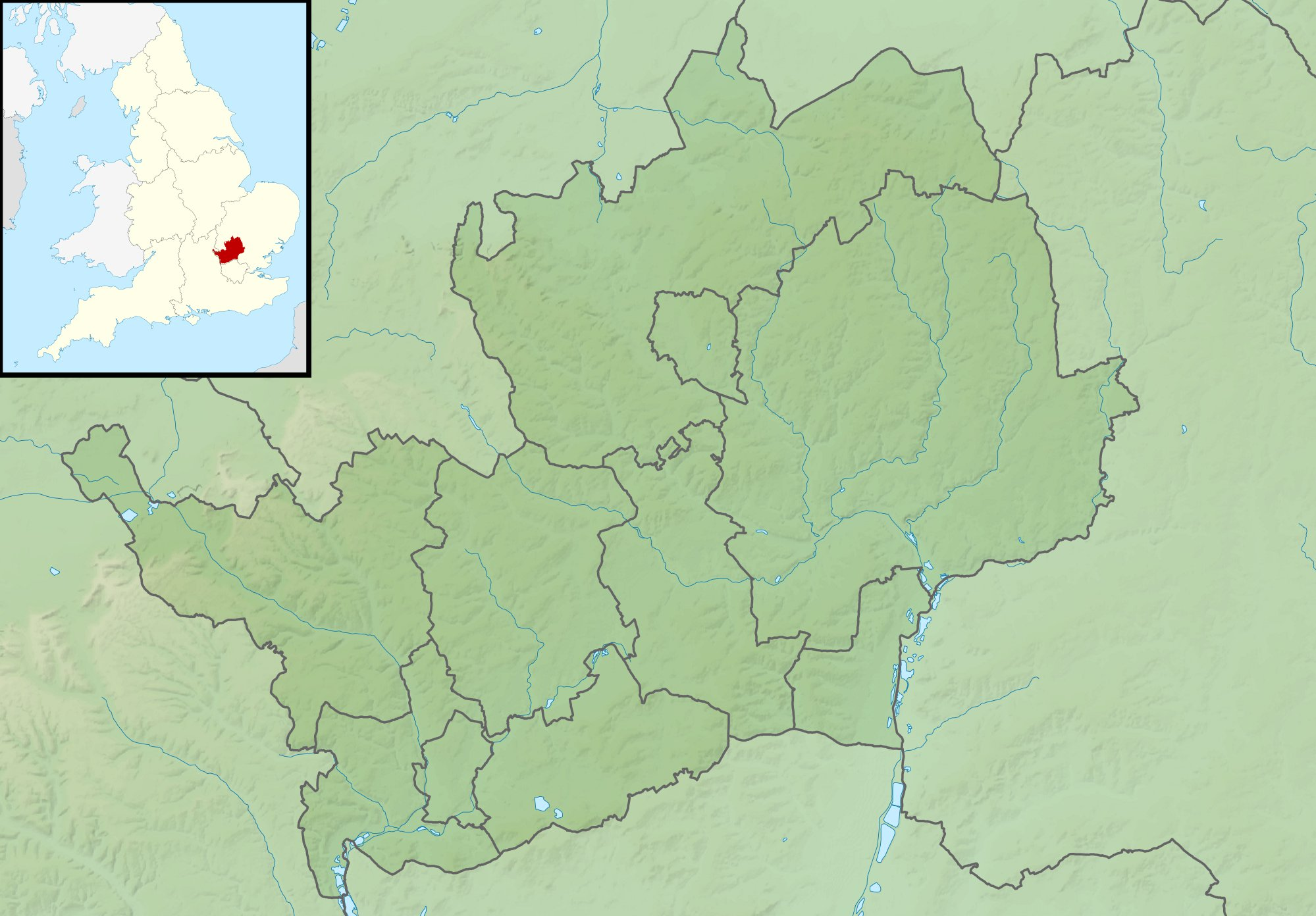
- Location in England Location in Hertfordshire

The Uniroyal International Championship was a professional golf tournament on the European Tour in 1976 and 1977. It was sponsored by rubber corporation Uniroyal, and hosted at Moor Park Golf Club near Rickmansworth, to the north of London, England.

In 1976 when it was called the Uniroyal International and won by Englishman Tommy Horton, and the following year, once the word "Championship" had been added to the name, and Seve Ballesteros of Spain was the victor. The prize fund in the second year was £29,010, which was mid-range for a European Tour event at that time.

== Winners ==
Year	Winner	Score	To par	Margin of victory	Runner-up	Winner's share (£)	Ref.
Uniroyal International Championship
1977	(Spain) Seve Ballesteros	276	−12	Playoff	(England) Nick Faldo	6,000	
Uniroyal International
1976	(England) Tommy Horton	277	−11	1 stroke	(England) Martin Foster	4,000	
