= Kerrygold International Classic =

Tournament information
- Location: Waterville, County Kerry, Ireland
- Established: 1975
- Course: Waterville Golf Links
- Par: 72
- Tour: European Tour
- Format: Stroke play
- Prize fund: £15,000
- Month played: June
- Final year: 1977

Tournament record score
- Aggregate: 287 Liam Higgins (1977)
- To par: −1 as above

Final champion
- (Republic of Ireland) Liam Higgins
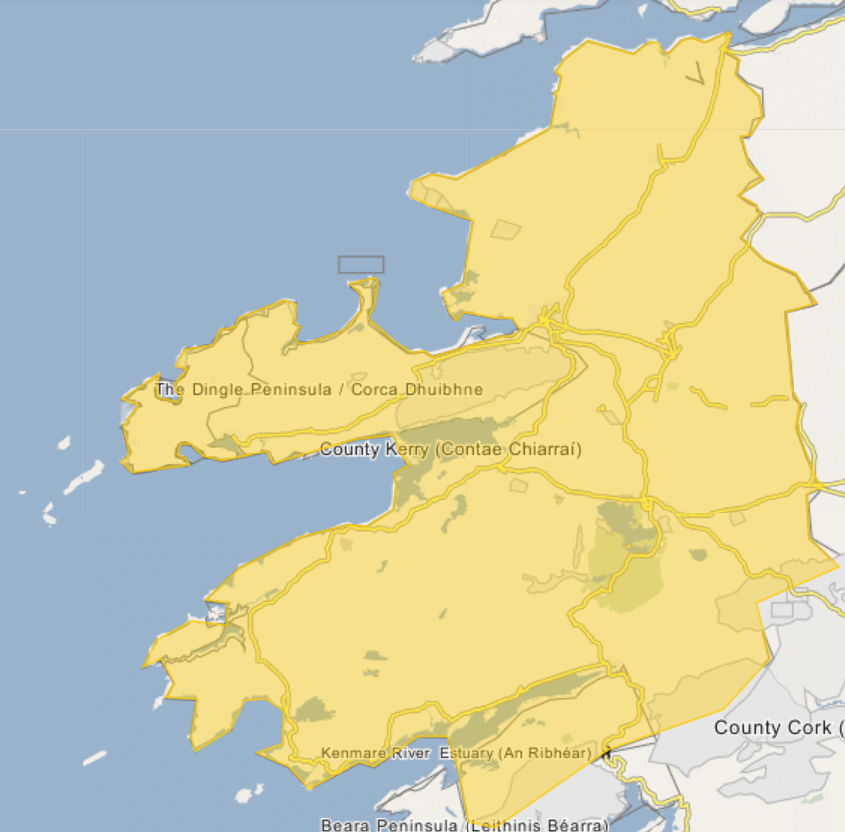
- Location in the Ireland Location in County Kerry

The Kerrygold International Classic was a men's golf tournament on the European Tour from 1975 to 1977. It was held at the Waterville Golf Links on the Ring of Kerry in County Kerry, Ireland.

The most notable of the three winners was former British and U.S. Open champion Tony Jacklin, with American George Burns and home professional Liam Higgins being the other two. Burns beat John Fowler at the second hole of a sudden-death playoff, making a par 4 after Fowler had taken a bogey 5.

== Winners ==
Year	Winner	Score	To par	Margin of victory	Runner-up
Kerrygold International
1977	(Republic of Ireland) Liam Higgins	287	−1	2 strokes	(England) Martin Foster
Kerrygold International Classic
1976	(England) Tony Jacklin	290	+2	1 stroke	(Northern Ireland) Eddie Polland
1975	(United States) George Burns	294	+6	Playoff	(England) John Fowler
