= Europcar Cup =

Tournament information
- Location: Biarritz, France
- Established: 1985
- Course: Golf de Biarritz Le Phare
- Par: 69
- Tour: European Tour
- Format: 4-man team stroke play
- Month played: November
- Final year: 1988

Final champion
- Sweden (Persson, Ryström, Lanner, Parnevik)

The Europcar Cup was a professional team golf tournament played yearly in Biarritz, France, from 1985 to 1988.

The tournament was designated as an "Approved Special Event" on the European Tour schedule. A further event was planned in 1989 but was cancelled.

The event was contested by national teams of four players. Each golfer played four stroke-play rounds; the best three scores for each round being used for the team's score for that round.

The 1988 Europcar Cup took place 3-6 November. Sweden won the 1988 event by 6 strokes with a score of 810, 18 under par. The Swedish team was Magnus Persson, Johan Ryström, Mats Lanner and Jesper Parnevik.

The following teams competed: Austria, Belgium, Denmark, England, Finland, France, Greece, Ireland, Italy, Netherlands, Scotland, Spain, Sweden, Switzerland, Wales, West Germany.

== Winners ==
Year	Team winners	Team members	Score	Margin of victory	Runners-up	Team members	Individual winner	Ref
1988	Sweden	Mats Lanner; Jesper Parnevik; Magnus Persson; Johan Ryström	810	7 strokes	Spain	Juan Anglada; Antonio Garrido; José Gervas; Miguel Ángel Martin	(Republic of Ireland) David Jones	
1987	Spain	Juan Anglada; Manuel Calero; Antonio Garrido; Miguel Angel Martin	813	8 strokes	Sweden	Peter Carsbo; Johan Ryström; Carl-Magnus Strömberg; Magnus Sunesson	(Spain) Manuel Calero	
1986	Sweden	Per-Arne Brostedt; Anders Forsbrand; Magnus Grankvist; Magnus Sunesson	817	2 strokes	Spain	Antonio Garrido; Miguel Ángel Martin; Juan Quiros; Emilio Rodriguez	(Sweden) Anders Forsbrand	
1985	France	Marc Farry; Bernard Pascassio	830	1 stroke	Italy	Silvano Locatelli	(Italy) Silvano Locatelli (France) Marc Farry	
