= Francisco Abreu =

Spanish professional golfer

Personal information
- Nickname: Tito
- Nationality: Spain
- Born: 30 August 1943 (age 83)
- Height: 1.87 m (6 ft 2 in)
- Weight: 225 lb (102 kg; 16.1 st)

Career
- Sport: Golf
- Turned professional: 1968
- Former tours: European Tour; European Seniors Tour
- Professional wins: 4

Number of wins by tour
- European Tour: 2
- Other: 2

Best results in major championships
- Masters Tournament: DNP
- PGA Championship: DNP
- U.S. Open: DNP
- The Open Championship: T44: 1978

Francisco Abreu (born 30 August 1943) is a Spanish professional golfer.

== Early life ==
Abreu is from Tenerife, Spain. Early in his career, he was a wrestler.

== Professional career ==
In 1968, Abreu turned professional and played on the European Tour. He was known as a long hitter. He won the 1973 German Open and the 1976 Madrid Open. At his Madrid win, he was nine strokes ahead of countryman Antonio Garrido on second place. His best Order of Merit finish of ninth came in 1977. From 1994 to 1999 he played on the European Seniors Tour. He did not win at that tour, but had some success on the senior level by winning the 1999 Spanish Seniors Professional Closed Championship and twice finish second in that tournament.

== Professional wins (4) ==
=== European Tour wins (2) ===
No.	Date	Tournament	Winning score	Margin of victory	Runner-up
1	5 Aug 1973	German Open	−12 (67-70-69-70=276)	2 strokes	(South Africa) Dale Hayes
2	1 May 1976	Madrid Open	−13 (75-65-66-69=275)	9 strokes	(Spain) Antonio Garrido

=== Other wins (1) ===
- 1973 Spanish Professional Closed Championship

=== Other senior wins (1) ===
- 1999 Spanish Seniors Professional Closed Championship

== Results in major championships ==
Tournament	1971	1972	1973	1974	1975	1976	1977	1978
The Open Championship	CUT							T44

Note: Abreu only played in the Open Championship.

Did not play

CUT = missed the half-way cut (3rd round cut in 1971 Open Championship)
"T" = tied

== Team appearances ==
- Sotogrande Match/Hennessy Cognac Cup (representing the Continent of Europe): 1974, 1978, 1980
- Double Diamond International (representing Continental Europe): 1976, 1977
