= Seve Ballesteros =

Spanish professional golfer (1957–2011)

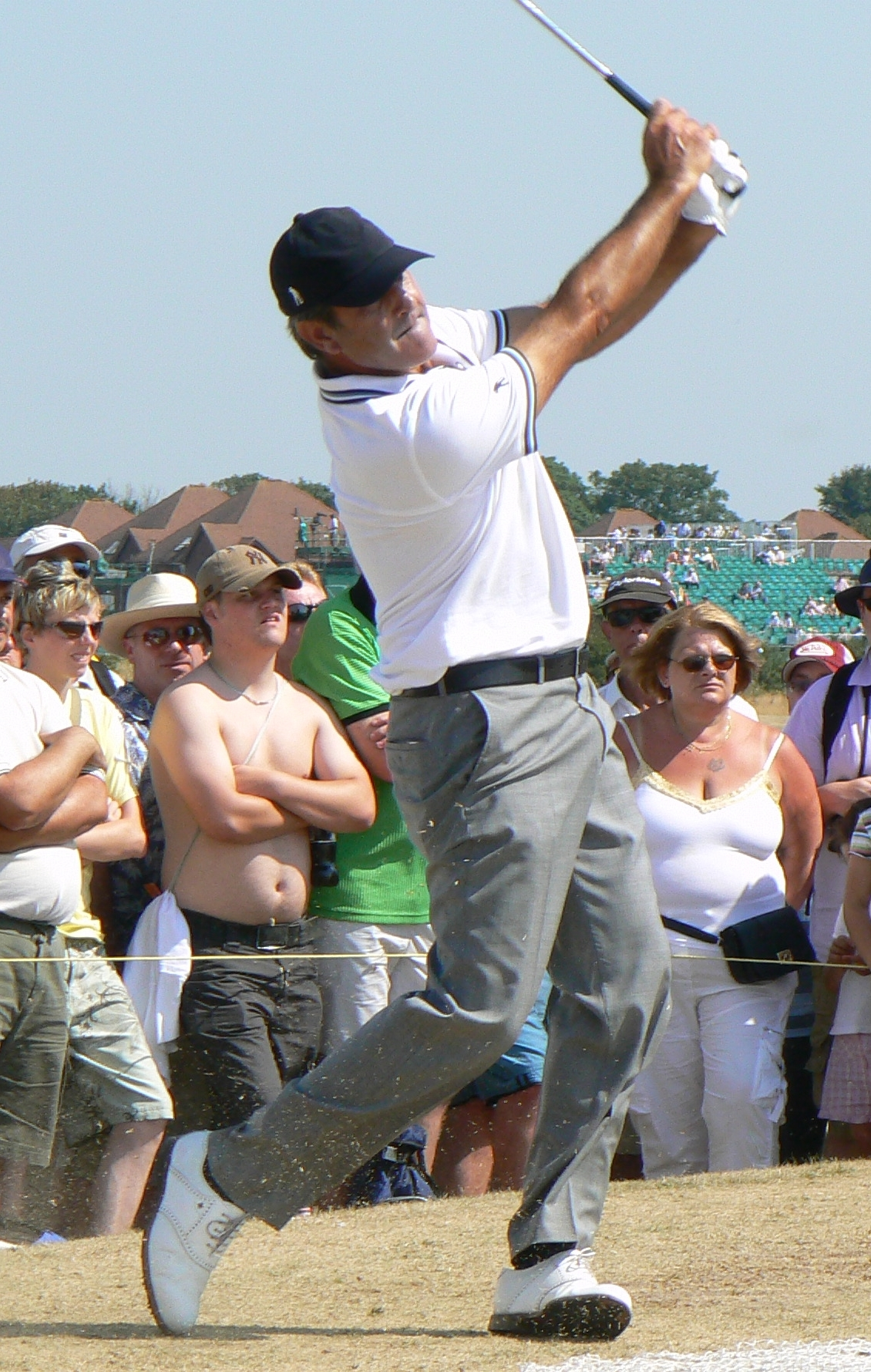
- Ballesteros in 2006

Personal information
- Full name: Severiano Ballesteros Sota
- Nationality: Spain
- Born: 9 April 1957 Pedreña, Cantabria, Spain
- Died: 7 May 2011 (aged 54) Pedreña, Cantabria, Spain
- Height: 1.83 m (6 ft 0 in)
- Spouse: Carmen Botín O'Shea (m. 1988; div. 2004)
- Children: 3

Career
- Sport: Golf
- Turned professional: 1974
- Former tours: PGA Tour; European Tour
- Professional wins: 89
- Highest ranking: 1 (27 April 1986) (61 weeks)

Number of wins by tour
- PGA Tour: 9
- European Tour: 50 (1st all time)
- Japan Golf Tour: 6
- PGA Tour of Australasia: 2
- Other: 26

Best results in major championships (wins: 5)
- Masters Tournament: Won: 1980, 1983
- PGA Championship: 5th: 1984
- U.S. Open: 3rd: 1987
- The Open Championship: Won: 1979, 1984, 1988

Achievements and awards
- World Golf Hall of Fame: 1999 (member page)
- European Tour Order of Merit winner: 1976, 1977, 1978, 1986, 1988, 1991
- European Tour Golfer of the Year: 1986, 1988, 1991

Severiano Ballesteros Sota (Spanish pronunciation: [seβeˈɾjano βaʎesˈteɾos]; 9 April 1957 – 7 May 2011) was a Spanish professional golfer, a World No. 1 who was one of the sport's leading figures from the mid-1970s to the mid-1990s. A member of a gifted golfing family, he won 89 international tournaments in his career, including five major championships between 1979 and 1988; The Open Championship three times and the Masters Tournament twice. He gained attention in the golfing world in 1976, when at the age of 19, he finished second at The Open. He played a leading role in the re-emergence of European golf, helping the European Ryder Cup team to five wins both as a player and captain.

Ballesteros won a record 50 European Tour titles. He won at least one European Tour title for 17 consecutive years between 1976 and 1992. His final victory was at the 1995 Peugeot Spanish Open. Largely because of back-related injuries, Ballesteros struggled with his form during the late 1990s. Despite this, he continued to be involved in golf, creating the Seve Trophy and running a golf course design business. In 2000, Golf Digest magazine ranked Ballesteros as the greatest Continental European golfer of all time.

In the 2000s, Ballesteros played sparingly due to continuing back problems and in 2007 he eventually retired from competitive professional golf. In 2008 he was diagnosed with a malignant brain tumour. Ballesteros was awarded the Lifetime Achievement Award for the second time at the BBC Sports Personality Awards in 2009. He was presented with the award at his home in Spain by his compatriot and former Ryder Cup teammate José María Olazábal.

Ballesteros died of brain cancer in 2011, aged 54.

== Early life ==
Severiano Ballesteros Sota was born in the village of Pedreña, Cantabria, Spain, on 9 April 1957, the youngest of five sons of Baldomero Ballesteros Presmanes (1919–1987), who was a farm labourer, and Carmen Sota Ocejo (1919–2002). One died in childhood, while all the others became professional golfers. He learned the game while playing on the beaches near his home, during the hours he was supposed to be in school, mainly using a 3-iron given to him by his older brother Manuel when he was eight years old. His maternal uncle Ramón Sota was Spanish professional champion four times and finished sixth in the Masters Tournament in 1965. Ballesteros's older brother Manuel finished in the top 100 on the European Tour Order of Merit every year from 1972 to 1983, and later became Ballesteros's manager. His brothers Vicente and Baldomero, and nephews Raúl and Ivan are also professional golfers.

== Professional career ==
Ballesteros turned professional in March 1974 at the age of 16. He burst onto the international scene with a second-place finish in 1976 Open Championship at Royal Birkdale Golf Club. He led by two shots after the third round, but a final round 74 saw him tie for second with Jack Nicklaus, six shots behind the winner Johnny Miller. He went on to win the European Tour Order of Merit (money title) that year, a title that he would win the next two years, and six times total, a record at the time (since surpassed by Colin Montgomerie). Ballesteros won his first Open Championship in 1979 with a closing 70, a round in which he famously hit his tee shot into a car park on the 16th hole yet still made birdie.

Ballesteros went on to win five major championships: the Masters Tournament in 1980 and 1983, and The Open Championship in 1979, 1984 and 1988. His 1980 Masters win was the first by a European player, and at the time he was the youngest winner of the tournament, at age 23 (though this record was broken by Tiger Woods in 1997, when he was 21 years old). His 1979 win at The Open Championship similarly made him the youngest winner of the tournament in the 20th century, and the first golfer from continental Europe to win a major since Frenchman Arnaud Massy won The Open in 1907. Ballesteros won the rain-delayed Masters in 1983 by five shots. As of 2023, he is the last golfer to win the Masters on a Monday. Ballesteros described the putt he holed on the 18th green at St Andrews to win the 1984 Open Championship as "the happiest moment of my whole sporting life."

On 30 September 1983, Ballesteros joined the PGA Tour. In 1984 he played in 15 tournaments, the minimal amount allowed for a golfer with membership. The following season he played in only 9 tournaments. He was subsequently suspended by the PGA Tour for failing to meet his commitment.

In 1988, Ballesteros won his fifth and last major title, The Open Championship at Royal Lytham & St Annes. The final round was played on Monday after torrential rain had flooded the course and forced Saturday's play to be abandoned. He described his final round of 65 which beat Nick Price by two shots as "perhaps the best round of my entire career."

For much of the 1980s and 1990s, Ballesteros was a mainstay of the European Ryder Cup team. He scored 22½ points in 37 matches against the United States; his partnership with fellow Spaniard José María Olazábal was the most successful in the history of the competition, with 11 wins and two halved matches out of 15 pairs matches. While Ballesteros was a member of European sides that won the Ryder Cup in 1985, retained the Cup in 1987 and 1989, and regained the Cup in 1995, the pinnacle of his career in the competition came in 1997, when he captained the winning European side at Valderrama Golf Club in Sotogrande, Spain. This was the first Ryder Cup ever held in continental Europe.

Ballesteros led the Official World Golf Ranking for a total of 61 weeks in the period from their inauguration (in April 1986) to September 1989, including being world number one at the end of the 1988 season. He also led McCormack's World Golf Rankings, published in McCormack's "World Of Professional Golf" annuals (from which the official rankings were developed) in 1983, 1984 and 1985. He was ever-present in the end-of-season world's top ten according to those rankings for fifteen years, from 1977 to 1991 inclusive.

=== Late career and retirement ===
In 1999, Ballesteros was inducted into the World Golf Hall of Fame. He was instrumental in introducing the Seve Trophy in 2000, a team competition similar to the Ryder Cup pitting a team from Great Britain and Ireland against one from continental Europe. In 2000, Ballesteros was ranked as the 16th greatest golfer of all time by Golf Digest magazine; he was the top golfer from the continent of Europe.

Ballesteros had played sparingly since the late 1990s because of back problems, and made his first start in years at the 2005 Madrid Open. He stated a desire to play more tournaments in the 2006 season. He entered the 2006 Open Championship, having played just one other event on the European Tour, The Open de France Alstom, where he missed the cut. He ran a thriving golf course design business and had been eligible for the Champions Tour and European Seniors Tour upon turning 50 in 2007. Ballesteros had been the captain of the European team in the Royal Trophy since its inception in 2006. He was announced again as non-playing captain of the 2008 European team to defend the Royal Trophy against the Asian team at the Amata Spring Country Club in Bangkok.

After further recurrences of his back problems, which contributed to his finishing tied for last in his only Champions Tour start, Ballesteros announced his retirement from golf on 16 July 2007, bringing down the curtain on an illustrious career. During the news conference, he also addressed reports in European media that he had attempted suicide, saying that those reports "were not even close to reality". He had been briefly hospitalized when he became concerned about the condition of his heart, but was released the same day after being given a clean bill of health.

Ballesteros was a member of the Laureus World Sports Academy. He had become involved in European golf course design in his later years, most famously altering the 17th hole at Valderrama before the 1997 Ryder Cup.

== Personal life ==
Ballesteros was married to Carmen Botín O'Shea, daughter of Emilio Botín, from 1988 until their divorce in 2004, in the municipality of Marina de Cudeyo in Cantabria. The couple had three children. The marriage was said to have run into trouble when Ballesteros could not accept the fact his career was on the wane.

== Death and legacy ==
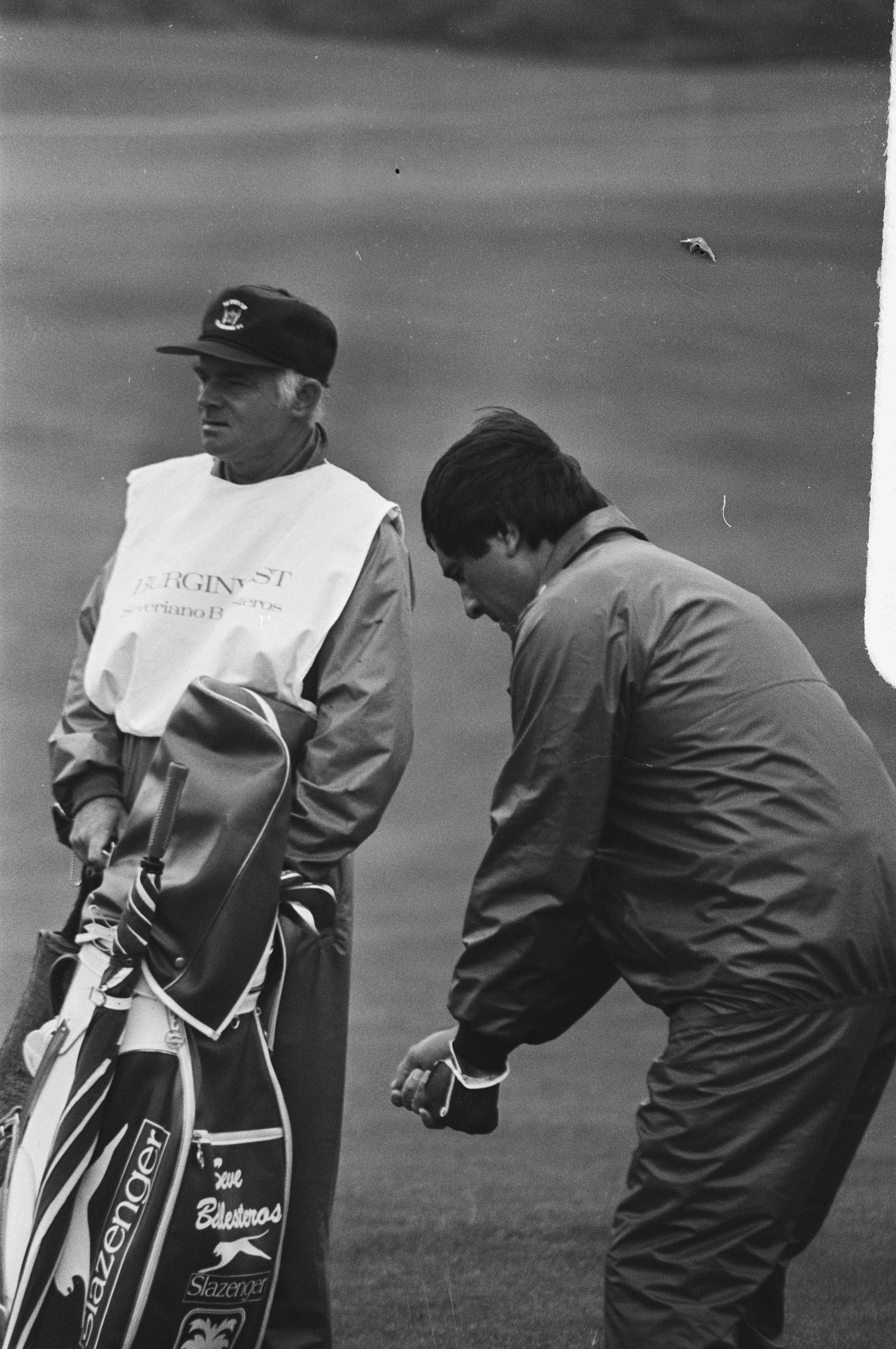
Ballesteros in 1986

At Madrid-Barajas Airport on 6 October 2008, Ballesteros lost consciousness and was admitted to hospital. Six days later, he confirmed that he had been diagnosed with a malignant brain tumour. On 15 October, Spanish news agency EFE reported that he had undergone a 12-hour operation to resect the tumour, the first of four operations he would have. A hospital spokeswoman stated that surgeons had removed a sizable part of the tumour. On 23 October, it was confirmed publicly that the tumour was classified as a cancerous oligoastrocytoma, and after a rapid deterioration of his health, further surgery took place on 24 October to stabilize him and try to remove the remainder of the tumour. On 24 October, it was confirmed that the tumour had been removed after a 6½-hour operation. On 3 November, it was confirmed by the hospital that he was starting his rehabilitation in the intensive care unit, and was breathing steadily. On 18 November, he was moved out of the intensive care unit and changed wards at Madrid's La Paz Hospital to continue his rehabilitation.

Ballesteros was discharged from hospital on 9 December 2008. He then returned home to northern Spain and underwent chemotherapy treatment as an outpatient. In January 2009, a message on his website said he had responded well to one course of chemotherapy.

I am very motivated and working hard although I am aware that my recovery will be slow and therefore I need to be patient and have a lot of determination. For these reasons I am following strictly all the instructions that the doctors are giving me. Besides, the physiotherapists are doing a great job on me and I feel better every day.

Ballesteros completed a second course of chemotherapy at Madrid's La Paz Hospital in February 2009. Speaking through his website he said, "The results of the check-up were really positive, better even than the first ones." He finished a third round of treatment in March 2009, and completed his fourth and final course of chemotherapy a month later.

In June 2009, Ballesteros made his first public appearance after treatment for the brain tumour. He said it was a "miracle" to be alive and he thanked everyone who had been involved in his care and welfare.

At his first public appearance, Ballesteros announced the launch of the Seve Ballesteros Foundation. This foundation was set up to help those with cancer fight it. The foundation aims to research cancer, especially brain tumours, but it will also help financially challenged young golfers, so they might be as successful as he.

On 6 May 2011, Ballesteros's family released a statement announcing that his neurological condition had "suffered a severe deterioration". He died within hours of the announcement in the early hours of 7 May 2011 at the age of 54; his older brother Baldomero confirmed the precise time of death at 2:10 am CEST.

=== Tributes ===
The Open de España was underway when Ballesteros died. The European Tour marked his death with a moment of silence during the third round at the Real Club de Golf El Prat in Barcelona.

Tiger Woods described Ballesteros as "one of the most talented and exciting golfers to ever play the game". Lee Westwood said of Ballesteros, "Seve made European golf what it is today".

Phil Mickelson, who won the 2010 Masters Tournament, selected a Spanish-themed menu for the 2011 Masters Champions Dinner in honour of Ballesteros, who was too ill to attend. Entrees included seafood paella and manchego-topped filet mignon, with a salad course, asparagus, and tortillas as sides, plus ice cream-topped apple empanada for dessert.

At the Madrid Open tennis tournament, a moment of silence was held prior to the semifinal match between Rafael Nadal and Roger Federer. Nadal, a close friend of Ballesteros, was seen wiping away tears as he watched the video screen.

On 8 May, at 15:08 EST, the three major U.S. men's tours stopped play and held a moment of silence.

On 10 May, the Irish Independent said of him: "He spoke many other languages too: the dialects of honour, of dignity, of sportsmanship, of decency, of fair play, of loyalty, of integrity, and in the end, of dauntless, unforgettable, astonishing courage. Quite simply, there has never been a finer ambassador for either his sport or his country."

A funeral service was held for Ballesteros, previously cremated, at the parish church of San Pedro, in his home village of Pedreña. Due to the number of those in attendance, several big screens were installed outside the 400-capacity church. His ashes were then to be scattered at his home estate.

The day of Ballesteros's death, the Spanish flag was raised at the World Golf Hall of Fame in Florida, the United States flag was lowered to half-staff, a photo of Ballesteros was hung in the box office, and a black ribbon was hung on the outside of his locker. The next weekend, at nearby TPC Sawgrass, the Spanish flag was flown at half-staff during the 2011 Players Championship at the request of defending champion Tim Clark, in place of his native South African flag. Clark went on to state, "Seve was a hero of mine growing up. . . . In losing [him] last week, I think the whole golfing world is saddened by that. To have his flag up here is just a small little tribute to him. Obviously he deserves a whole lot more."

=== Legacy ===
The 2012 Ryder Cup, the first to be played after Ballesteros's death, saw the European team wearing navy blue and white garments on the final day in memory of Seve, who traditionally wore navy blue on the last day of a tournament. Additionally, the team's kit also bore the silhouette of Ballesteros after his win at the 1984 Open Championship. The Irish golfer Pádraig Harrington, Nick Faldo, and other European players proposed that the PGA replace the image of Harry Vardon on the European Tour's official logo with one of Ballesteros (a silhouette of the iconic image of Ballesteros's "salute", following his win at the 1984 Open Championship).

The airport of Ballesteros's homeland, Cantabria, has been named after him since the Spanish Government approved the change on 16 April 2015. The name was changed from Santander Airport to Seve Ballesteros–Santander Airport. This change was made after the regional parliament unanimously approved a petition in May 2014. The motivation behind this popular initiative was to honor Ballesteros for being one of the most universal of Cantabrians and an example in sports and life.

In 2017, the European Tour Players' Player of the Year award was renamed in his honour. The first recipient of The Seve Ballesteros Award was Henrik Stenson.

== Professional wins (89) ==
=== PGA Tour wins (9) ===
Legend
Major championships (5)
Other PGA Tour (4)

| No. | Date | Tournament | Winning score | Margin of victory | Runner(s)-up |
|---|---|---|---|---|---|
| 1 | 2 Apr 1978 | Greater Greensboro Open | −6 (72-75-69-66=282) | 1 stroke | (United States) Jack Renner, (United States) Fuzzy Zoeller |
| 2 | 21 Jul 1979 | The Open Championship | −1 (73-65-75-70=283) | 3 strokes | (United States) Ben Crenshaw, (United States) Jack Nicklaus |
| 3 | 13 Apr 1980 | Masters Tournament | −13 (66-69-68-72=275) | 4 strokes | (United States) Gibby Gilbert, (Australia) Jack Newton |
| 4 | 11 Apr 1983 | Masters Tournament (2) | −8 (68-70-73-69=280) | 4 strokes | (United States) Ben Crenshaw, (United States) Tom Kite |
| 5 | 12 Jun 1983 | Manufacturers Hanover Westchester Classic | −8 (69-67-70-70=276) | 2 strokes | (United States) Andy Bean, (United States) Craig Stadler |
| 6 | 22 Jul 1984 | The Open Championship (2) | −12 (69-68-70-69=276) | 2 strokes | (West Germany) Bernhard Langer, (United States) Tom Watson |
| 7 | 17 Mar 1985 | USF&G Classic | −11 (68-69-68=205)* | 2 strokes | (United States) Peter Jacobsen, (United States) John Mahaffey |
| 8 | 12 Jun 1988 | Manufacturers Hanover Westchester Classic (2) | −8 (72-68-69-67=276) | Playoff | (South Africa) David Frost, (United States) Ken Green, (Australia) Greg Norman |
| 9 | 17 Jul 1988 | The Open Championship (3) | −11 (67-71-70-65=273) | 2 strokes | (Zimbabwe) Nick Price |

*Note: The 1985 USF&G Classic was reduced to 54 holes due to inclement weather.

PGA Tour playoff record (1–2)

| No. | Year | Tournament | Opponent(s) | Result |
|---|---|---|---|---|
| 1 | 1987 | Masters Tournament | (United States) Larry Mize, (Australia) Greg Norman | Mize won with birdie on second extra hole Ballesteros eliminated by par on first hole |
| 2 | 1987 | Manufacturers Hanover Westchester Classic | (United States) J. C. Snead | Lost to par on first extra hole |
| 3 | 1988 | Manufacturers Hanover Westchester Classic | (South Africa) David Frost, (United States) Ken Green, (Australia) Greg Norman | Won with birdie on first extra hole |

=== European Tour wins (50) ===
Legend
Major championships (5)
Flagship events (1)
Other European Tour (44)

| No. | Date | Tournament | Winning score | Margin of victory | Runner(s)-up |
|---|---|---|---|---|---|
| 1 | 8 Aug 1976 | Dutch Open | −13 (65-73-68-69=275) | 8 strokes | (England) Howard Clark |
| 2 | 8 May 1977 | French Open | −6 (69-70-71-72=282) | 3 strokes | (South Africa) John Bland, (Spain) Antonio Garrido, (Spain) Manuel Piñero, (Australia) Ian Stanley |
| 3 | 25 Jun 1977 | Uniroyal International Championship | −12 (70-70-67-69=276) | Playoff | (England) Nick Faldo |
| 4 | 17 Jul 1977 | Swiss Open | −7 (68-66-70-69=273) | 3 strokes | (United States) John Schroeder |
| 5 | 21 May 1978 | Martini International | −14 (67-67-67-69=270) | 5 strokes | (England) Nick Faldo |
| 6 | 30 Jul 1978 | Braun German Open | −20 (64-67-70-67=268) | 2 strokes | (England) Neil Coles |
| 7 | 6 Aug 1978 | Scandinavian Enterprise Open | −9 (73-69-68-69=279) | 1 stroke | (South Africa) Dale Hayes |
| 8 | 3 Sep 1978 | Swiss Open (2) | −8 (68-68-68-68=272) | 3 strokes | (Spain) Manuel Piñero |
| 9 | 1 Jul 1979 | Lada English Golf Classic | −2 (73-71-71-71=286) | 6 strokes | (England) Neil Coles, (South Africa) Simon Hobday |
| 10 | 21 Jul 1979 | The Open Championship | −1 (73-65-75-70=283) | 3 strokes | (United States) Ben Crenshaw, (United States) Jack Nicklaus |
| 11 | 13 Apr 1980 | Masters Tournament | −13 (66-69-68-72=275) | 4 strokes | (United States) Gibby Gilbert, (Australia) Jack Newton |
| 12 | 27 Apr 1980 | Madrid Open | −18 (68-63-70-69=270) | 3 strokes | (Spain) Manuel Piñero |
| 13 | 18 May 1980 | Martini International (2) | −2 (74-75-67-70=286) | 1 stroke | (Scotland) Brian Barnes |
| 14 | 27 Jul 1980 | Dutch Open (2) | −8 (69-75-65-71=280) | 3 strokes | (Scotland) Sandy Lyle |
| 15 | 5 Jul 1981 | Scandinavian Enterprise Open (2) | −11 (69-70-68-66=273) | 5 strokes | (Spain) Antonio Garrido |
| 16 | 4 Oct 1981 | Benson & Hedges Spanish Open | −15 (71-67-70-65=273) | 1 stroke | (Scotland) Steve Martin |
| 17 | 25 Apr 1982 | Cepsa Madrid Open (2) | −15 (70-69-66-68=273) | 1 stroke | (Spain) José María Cañizares |
| 18 | 9 May 1982 | Paco Rabanne Open de France (2) | −10 (71-70-72-65=278) | 4 strokes | (Scotland) Sandy Lyle |
| 19 | 11 Apr 1983 | Masters Tournament (2) | −8 (68-70-73-69=280) | 4 strokes | (United States) Ben Crenshaw, (United States) Tom Kite |
| 20 | 30 May 1983 | Sun Alliance PGA Championship | −2 (69-71-67-71=278) | 2 strokes | (Scotland) Ken Brown |
| 21 | 14 Aug 1983 | Carroll's Irish Open | −17 (67-67-70-67=271) | 2 strokes | (Scotland) Brian Barnes |
| 22 | 2 Oct 1983 | Trophée Lancôme | −19 (71-65-64-69=269) | 4 strokes | (United States) Corey Pavin |
| 23 | 22 Jul 1984 | The Open Championship (2) | −12 (69-68-70-69=276) | 2 strokes | (West Germany) Bernhard Langer, (United States) Tom Watson |
| 24 | 23 Jun 1985 | Carroll's Irish Open (2) | −10 (70-69-73-66=278) | Playoff | (West Germany) Bernhard Langer |
| 25 | 7 Jul 1985 | Peugeot Open de France (3) | −21 (62-68-64-69=263) | 2 strokes | (Scotland) Sandy Lyle |
| 26 | 22 Sep 1985 | Sanyo Open | −16 (66-70-65-71=272) | 3 strokes | (South Africa) Jeff Hawkes |
| 27 | 27 Oct 1985 | Benson & Hedges Spanish Open (2) | −14 (67-68-65-66=266) | 4 strokes | (Scotland) Gordon Brand Jnr |
| 28 | 8 Jun 1986 | Dunhill British Masters | −13 (67-68-70-70=275) | 2 strokes | (Scotland) Gordon Brand Jnr |
| 29 | 22 Jun 1986 | Carroll's Irish Open (3) | −3 (68-75-68-74=285) | 2 strokes | (Australia) Rodger Davis, (Zimbabwe) Mark McNulty |
| 30 | 28 Jun 1986 | Johnnie Walker Monte Carlo Open | −11 (66-71-64-64=265) | 2 strokes | (Zimbabwe) Mark McNulty |
| 31 | 7 Jul 1986 | Peugeot Open de France (4) | −19 (65-66-69-69=269) | 2 strokes | (Argentina) Vicente Fernández |
| 32 | 27 Jul 1986 | KLM Dutch Open (3) | −17 (69-63-71-68=271) | 8 strokes | (Spain) José Rivero |
| 33 | 19 Oct 1986 | Trophée Lancôme (2) | −14 (67-69-68-70=274) | Shared title with (West Germany) Bernhard Langer (Note: Ballesteros and Langer agreed to share the 1986 Trophée Lancôme after failing light caused play to halt after four holes of a playoff.) | |
| 34 | 19 Apr 1987 | Suze Open | −13 (69-70-68-68=275) | Playoff | (Wales) Ian Woosnam |
| 35 | 13 Mar 1988 | Mallorca Open de Baleares | −16 (70-68-67-67=272) | 6 strokes | (Spain) José María Olazábal |
| 36 | 17 Jul 1988 | The Open Championship (3) | −11 (67-71-70-65=273) | 2 strokes | (Zimbabwe) Nick Price |
| 37 | 31 Jul 1988 | Scandinavian Enterprise Open (3) | −18 (67-70-66-67=270) | 5 strokes | (Australia) Gerry Taylor |
| 38 | 28 Aug 1988 | German Open (2) | −21 (68-68-65-62=263) | 5 strokes | (Scotland) Gordon Brand Jnr |
| 39 | 18 Sep 1988 | Trophée Lancôme (3) | −15 (64-66-68-71=269) | 4 strokes | (Spain) José María Olazábal |
| 40 | 23 Apr 1989 | Cepsa Madrid Open (3) | −16 (67-67-69-69=272) | 1 stroke | (England) Howard Clark |
| 41 | 7 May 1989 | Epson Grand Prix of Europe Matchplay Championship | 4 and 3 | | (England) Denis Durnian |
| 42 | 3 Sep 1989 | Ebel European Masters Swiss Open (3) | −14 (65-68-66-67=266) | 2 strokes | (Australia) Craig Parry |
| 43 | 11 Mar 1990 | Open Renault de Baleares (2) | −19 (66-65-70-68=269) | Playoff | (Sweden) Magnus Persson |
| 44 | 27 May 1991 | Volvo PGA Championship (2) | −17 (67-69-65-70=271) | Playoff | (Scotland) Colin Montgomerie |
| 45 | 2 Jun 1991 | Dunhill British Masters (2) | −13 (66-66-68-75=275) | 3 strokes | (Republic of Ireland) Eamonn Darcy, (England) David Gilford, (Zimbabwe) Tony Johnstone, (Scotland) Sam Torrance, (England) Keith Waters |
| 46 | 9 Feb 1992 | Dubai Desert Classic | −16 (66-67-69-70=272) | Playoff | (Northern Ireland) Ronan Rafferty |
| 47 | 8 Mar 1992 | Turespaña Open de Baleares (3) | −11 (70-70-69-68=277) | Playoff | (Sweden) Jesper Parnevik |
| 48 | 8 May 1994 | Benson & Hedges International Open | −7 (69-70-72-70=281) | 3 strokes | (England) Nick Faldo |
| 49 | 3 Oct 1994 | Mercedes German Masters | −18 (68-70-65-67=270) | Playoff | (South Africa) Ernie Els, (Spain) José María Olazábal |
| 50 | 21 May 1995 | Peugeot Spanish Open (3) | −14 (70-67-66-71=274) | 2 strokes | (Spain) Ignacio Garrido, (Spain) José Rivero |

European Tour playoff record (8–4–1)

| No. | Year | Tournament | Opponent(s) | Result |
|---|---|---|---|---|
| 1 | 1977 | Uniroyal International Championship | (England) Nick Faldo | Won with birdie on first extra hole |
| 2 | 1983 | Italian Open | (Scotland) Ken Brown, (West Germany) Bernhard Langer | Langer won with birdie on second extra hole Ballesteros eliminated by par on first hole |
| 3 | 1984 | Trophée Lancôme | (Scotland) Sandy Lyle | Lost to birdie on first extra hole |
| 4 | 1985 | Carroll's Irish Open | (West Germany) Bernhard Langer | Won with birdie on second extra hole |
| 5 | 1986 | Trophée Lancôme | (West Germany) Bernhard Langer | Playoff abandoned after four holes due to darkness; tournament shared |
| 6 | 1987 | Masters Tournament | (United States) Larry Mize, (Australia) Greg Norman | Mize won with birdie on second extra hole Ballesteros eliminated by par on first hole |
| 7 | 1987 | Suze Open | (Wales) Ian Woosnam | Won with par on first extra hole |
| 8 | 1990 | Open Renault de Baleares | (Sweden) Magnus Persson | Won with par on first extra hole |
| 9 | 1991 | Peugeot Spanish Open | (Argentina) Eduardo Romero | Lost to birdie on seventh extra hole |
| 10 | 1991 | Volvo PGA Championship | (Scotland) Colin Montgomerie | Won with birdie on first extra hole |
| 11 | 1992 | Dubai Desert Classic | (Northern Ireland) Ronan Rafferty | Won with birdie on second extra hole |
| 12 | 1992 | Turespaña Open de Baleares | (Sweden) Jesper Parnevik | Won with birdie on sixth extra hole |
| 13 | 1994 | Mercedes German Masters | (South Africa) Ernie Els, (Spain) José María Olazábal | Won with birdie on first extra hole |

=== PGA of Japan Tour wins (6) ===
| No. | Date | Tournament | Winning score | Margin of victory | Runner-up |
|---|---|---|---|---|---|
| 1 | 20 Nov 1977 | Japan Open Golf Championship | E (69-72-72-71=284) | 1 stroke | (Japan) Takashi Murakami |
| 2 | 27 Nov 1977 | Dunlop Phoenix Tournament | −6 (68-70-73-71=282) | 1 stroke | (Japan) Kikuo Arai |
| 3 | 5 Nov 1978 | Japan Open Golf Championship (2) | −7 (68-67-71-75=281) | Playoff | (Australia) Graham Marsh |
| 4 | 22 Nov 1981 | Dunlop Phoenix Tournament (2) | −9 (72-66-69-72=279) | 3 strokes | (Japan) Tsuneyuki Nakajima |
| 5 | 13 Nov 1988 | Visa Taiheiyo Club Masters | −7 (71-71-68-71=281) | 3 strokes | (Japan) Yasuhiro Funatogawa |
| 6 | 5 May 1991 | The Crowns | −5 (67-75-64-69=275) | 1 stroke | (Australia) Roger Mackay |

PGA of Japan Tour playoff record (1–1)

| No. | Year | Tournament | Opponent(s) | Result |
|---|---|---|---|---|
| 1 | 1978 | Japan Open Golf Championship | (Australia) Graham Marsh | Won with birdie on first extra hole |
| 2 | 1991 | Dunlop Phoenix Tournament | (Japan) Isao Aoki, (United States) Jay Don Blake, (United States) Larry Nelson | Nelson won with par on fourth extra hole Ballesteros eliminated by birdie on third hole Blake eliminated by par on first hole |

=== PGA Tour of Australia wins (1) ===
| No. | Date | Tournament | Winning score | Margin of victory | Runner-up |
|---|---|---|---|---|---|
| 1 | 8 Nov 1981 | Mayne Nickless Australian PGA Championship | −6 (73-74-66-69=282) | 3 strokes | (Australia) Bill Dunk |

=== New Zealand Golf Circuit wins (1) ===
| No. | Date | Tournament | Winning score | Margin of victory | Runner-up |
|---|---|---|---|---|---|
| 1 | 4 Dec 1977 | Otago Charity Classic | −17 (69-67-66-67=271) | 3 strokes | (United States) Bob Byman |

=== Safari Circuit wins (1) ===
| No. | Date | Tournament | Winning score | Margin of victory | Runner-up |
|---|---|---|---|---|---|
| 1 | 12 Mar 1978 | Kenya Open | −10 (73-66-69-66=274) | 1 stroke | (Scotland) Bernard Gallacher |

=== Other wins (26) ===
- 1974 Spanish National Championship for under 25s, Open de Vizcaya
- 1975 Spanish National Championship for under 25s
- 1976 Memorial Donald Swaelens, Cataluña Championship, Tenerife Championship, Lancome Trophy, World Cup of Golf (with Manuel Piñero)
- 1977 Braun International Golf (Germany), World Cup of Golf (with Antonio Garrido)
- 1978 Spanish National Championship for under 25s
- 1979 Open el Prat
- 1981 Suntory World Match Play Championship
- 1982 Masters de San Remo (Italy), Suntory World Match Play Championship
- 1983 Million Dollar Challenge (South Africa)
- 1984 Suntory World Match Play Championship, Million Dollar Challenge (South Africa)
- 1985 Suntory World Match Play Championship, Spanish Professional Closed Championship
- 1987 Spanish Professional Closed Championship, APG larios
- 1988 APG Larios
- 1991 Toyota World Match Play Championship
- 1992 Copa Quinto Centenario por Equipos
- 1995 Tournoi Perrier de Paris (with José María Olazábal)

== Major championships ==
=== Wins (5) ===
| Year | Championship | 54 holes | Winning score | Margin | Runner(s)-up |
|---|---|---|---|---|---|
| 1979 | The Open Championship | 2 shot deficit | −1 (73-65-75-70=283) | 3 strokes | (United States) Jack Nicklaus, (United States) Ben Crenshaw |
| 1980 | Masters Tournament | 7 shot lead | −13 (66-69-68-72=275) | 4 strokes | (United States) Gibby Gilbert, (Australia) Jack Newton |
| 1983 | Masters Tournament (2) | 1 shot deficit | −8 (68-70-73-69=280) | 4 strokes | (United States) Ben Crenshaw, (United States) Tom Kite |
| 1984 | The Open Championship (2) | 2 shot deficit | −12 (69-68-70-69=276) | 2 strokes | (West Germany) Bernhard Langer, (United States) Tom Watson |
| 1988 | The Open Championship (3) | 2 shot deficit | −11 (67-71-70-65=273) | 2 strokes | (Zimbabwe) Nick Price |

=== Results timeline ===
| Tournament | 1975 | 1976 | 1977 | 1978 | 1979 |
|---|---|---|---|---|---|
| Masters Tournament | | | T33 | T18 | T12 |
| U.S. Open | | | | T16 | CUT |
| The Open Championship | CUT | T2 | T15 | T17 | 1 |
| PGA Championship | | | | | |

| Tournament | 1980 | 1981 | 1982 | 1983 | 1984 | 1985 | 1986 | 1987 | 1988 | 1989 |
|---|---|---|---|---|---|---|---|---|---|---|
| Masters Tournament | 1 | CUT | T3 | 1 | CUT | T2 | 4 | T2 | T11 | 5 |
| U.S. Open | DQ | T41 | CUT | T4 | T30 | T5 | T24 | 3 | T32 | T43 |
| The Open Championship | T19 | T39 | T13 | T6 | 1 | T39 | T6 | T50 | 1 | T77 |
| PGA Championship | | T33 | 13 | T27 | 5 | T32 | CUT | T10 | CUT | T12 |

| Tournament | 1990 | 1991 | 1992 | 1993 | 1994 | 1995 | 1996 | 1997 | 1998 | 1999 |
|---|---|---|---|---|---|---|---|---|---|---|
| Masters Tournament | T7 | T22 | T59 | T11 | T18 | T45 | 43 | CUT | CUT | CUT |
| U.S. Open | T33 | CUT | T23 | CUT | T18 | CUT | | | | |
| The Open Championship | CUT | T9 | CUT | T27 | T38 | T40 | CUT | CUT | CUT | CUT |
| PGA Championship | CUT | T23 | | | CUT | CUT | | | | |

| Tournament | 2000 | 2001 | 2002 | 2003 | 2004 | 2005 | 2006 | 2007 |
|---|---|---|---|---|---|---|---|---|
| Masters Tournament | CUT | CUT | CUT | CUT | | | | CUT |
| U.S. Open | | | | | | | | |
| The Open Championship | CUT | CUT | | | | | CUT | |
| PGA Championship | | | | | | | | |

Win
Top 10
Did not play

CUT = missed the half-way cut
DQ = disqualified
"T" = tied

=== Summary ===
| Tournament | Wins | 2nd | 3rd | Top-5 | Top-10 | Top-25 | Events | Cuts made |
|---|---|---|---|---|---|---|---|---|
| Masters Tournament | 2 | 2 | 1 | 7 | 8 | 14 | 28 | 18 |
| U.S. Open | 0 | 0 | 1 | 3 | 3 | 7 | 18 | 12 |
| The Open Championship | 3 | 1 | 0 | 4 | 7 | 11 | 28 | 18 |
| PGA Championship | 0 | 0 | 0 | 1 | 2 | 5 | 13 | 8 |
| Totals | 5 | 3 | 2 | 15 | 20 | 37 | 87 | 56 |

- Most consecutive cuts made – 10 (1984 U.S. Open – 1986 Open Championship)
- Longest streak of top-10s – 4 (1984 Open Championship – 1985 U.S. Open)

== Results in The Players Championship ==
| Tournament | 1979 | 1980 | 1981 | 1982 | 1983 | 1984 | 1985 | 1986 | 1987 | 1988 | 1989 |
|---|---|---|---|---|---|---|---|---|---|---|---|
| The Players Championship | CUT | T3 | T29 | T6 | T35 | T3 | CUT | | T65 | CUT | |

| Tournament | 1990 | 1991 | 1992 | 1993 | 1994 | 1995 | 1996 | 1997 | 1998 | 1999 |
|---|---|---|---|---|---|---|---|---|---|---|
| The Players Championship | | T63 | CUT | | CUT | T37 | | | | CUT |

Top 10
Did not play

CUT = missed the halfway cut
"T" indicates a tie for a place

== Team appearances ==
- Ryder Cup (representing Europe): 1979, 1983, 1985 (winners), 1987 (winners), 1989 (tied, cup retained), 1991, 1993, 1995 (winners), 1997 (winners – non-playing captain)

Ryder Cup points record
| 1979 | 1981 | 1983 | 1985 | 1987 | 1989 | 1991 | 1993 | 1995 | Total |
|---|---|---|---|---|---|---|---|---|---|
| 1 | - | 3 | 3.5 | 4 | 3.5 | 4.5 | 2 | 1 | 22.5 |

- World Cup (representing Spain): 1975, 1976 (winners), 1977 (winners), 1991
- Double Diamond International: 1975 (Rest of the World), 1976 (Continental Europe), 1977 (Continental Europe)
- Hennessy Cognac Cup (representing the Continent of Europe): 1976, 1978, 1980
- Dunhill Cup (representing Spain): 1985, 1986, 1988
- Seve Trophy (representing continental Europe): 2000 (winners - playing captain), 2002 (playing captain), 2003 (playing captain), 2005 (non-playing captain), 2007 (non-playing captain)
- Royal Trophy (representing Europe): 2006 (winners – non-playing captain), 2007 (winners – non-playing captain)

== Equipment ==
Ballesteros used Ping putters consistently throughout his career and has more golden clubs for wins in the Ping Gold Putter Vault than any other player.

== See also ==
- List of golfers with most European Tour wins
- List of men's major championships winning golfers
- List of golf course architects

== Notes ==
Awards
| Preceded by Carl Lewis | BBC Overseas Sports Personality of the Year; 1984 | Succeeded by Boris Becker |
| Preceded by Juan Antonio Samaranch | Prince of Asturias Award for Sports; 1989 | Succeeded by Alfonso Pons |
