= Martin Foster (golfer) =

English golfer

Personal information
- Full name: Martin Francis Foster
- Nationality: England
- Born: 12 May 1952 (age 74) Bradford, England
- Height: 6 ft 4 in (1.93 m)
- Weight: 191 lb (87 kg; 13.6 st)

Career
- Sport: Golf
- Turned professional: 1973
- Former tours: European Tour; European Seniors Tour

Best results in major championships
- Masters Tournament: DNP
- PGA Championship: DNP
- U.S. Open: DNP
- The Open Championship: T23: 1975

Martin Francis Foster (born 12 May 1952) is an English professional golfer who played on the European Tour from 1974 to 1982 and later on the European Senior Tour. He never won on the European Tour but was runner-up five times, the Double Diamond Strokeplay in 1975, the Irish Open and Uniroyal International Championship in 1976, the Kerrygold International Classic in 1977 and the Coral Welsh Classic in 1980. He finished 7th in the 1976 European Tour Order of Merit.

In the 1977 Open Championship at Turnberry, Foster has a first-round 67 to lie in second place. Further rounds of 74, 75 and 73 left him tied for 26th place.

== Amateur wins ==
- 1969 Boys Amateur Championship
- 1970 Carris Trophy

== Results in major championships ==
Tournament	1971	1972	1973	1974	1975	1976	1977	1978	1979
The Open Championship	CUT			CUT	T23	T38	T26		T41

Note: Foster only played in The Open Championship.

Did not play

CUT = missed the half-way cut
"T" = tied

== Team appearances ==
- World Cup (representing England): 1976
- Double Diamond International (representing England): 1976 (winners)
- Hennessy Cognac Cup (representing Great Britain and Ireland): 1976 (winners)
