= Antonio Garrido (golfer) =

Spanish professional golfer (born 1944)

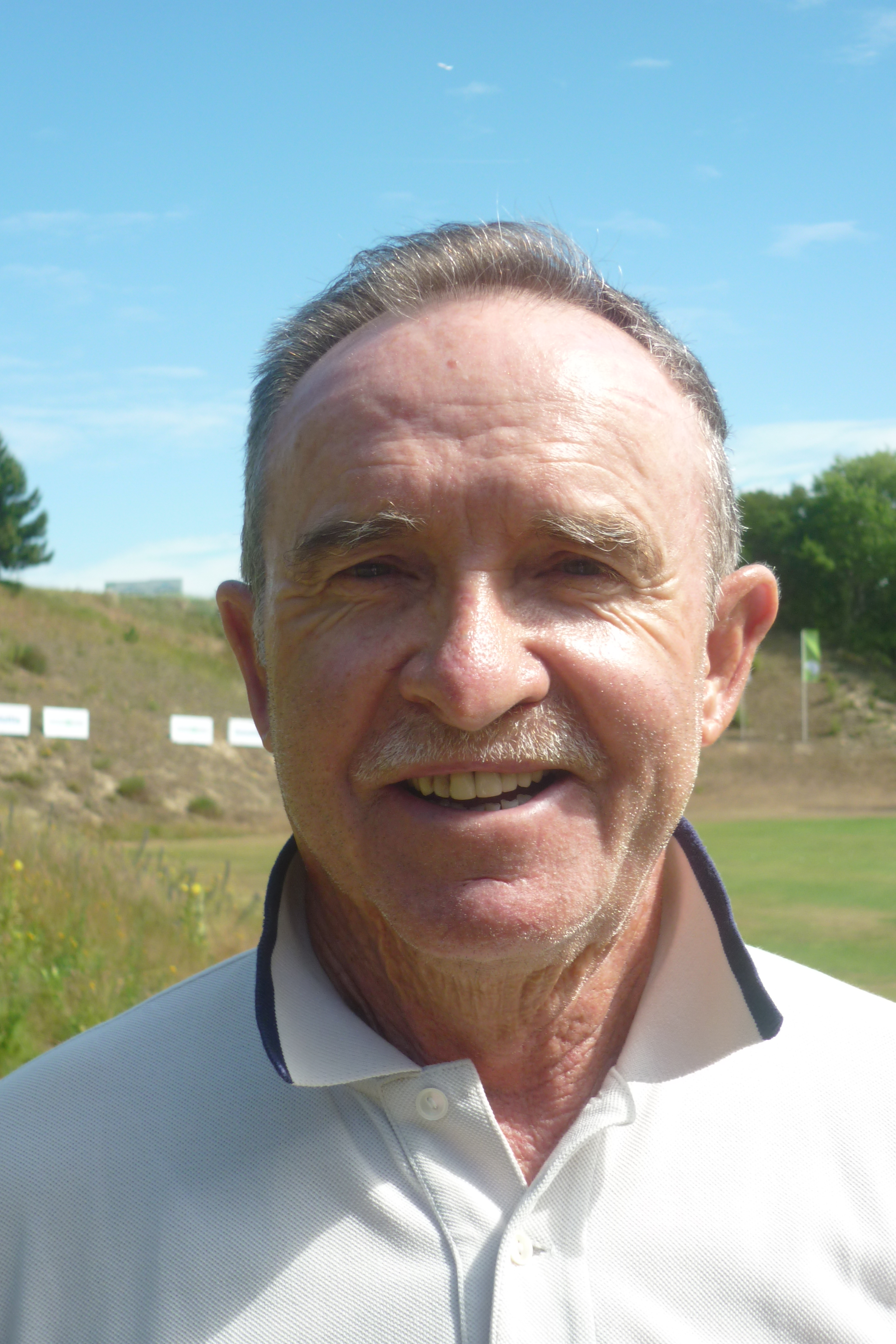

Personal information
- Nationality: Spain
- Born: 2 February 1944 (age 82) Madrid, Spain
- Height: 5 ft 8 in (1.73 m)
- Spouse: Alicia
- Children: 3, including Ignacio

Career
- Sport: Golf
- Turned professional: 1961
- Former tours: European Tour; European Seniors Tour
- Professional wins: 26

Number of wins by tour
- European Tour: 5
- European Senior Tour: 2
- Other: 11 (regular); 8 (senior)

Best results in major championships
- Masters Tournament: CUT: 1978
- PGA Championship: DNP
- U.S. Open: DNP
- The Open Championship: T24: 1978

Antonio Garrido (born 2 February 1944) is a Spanish professional golfer. He won five times on the European Tour and twice on the European Senior Tour. He played in the 1979 Ryder Cup, the first Ryder Cup in which continental European golfers were eligible to play.

== Career ==
Garrido played on the European Tour from its first official season in 1972 and won five tournaments between 1972 and 1986. He is notable for winning the first ever official European Tour event, the 1972 Spanish Open. His best year was 1977 when he won the Madrid Open and the Benson & Hedges International Open and finished third on the Order of Merit. That same season he teamed up with Seve Ballesteros to win the World Cup of Golf for Spain, finishing three strokes ahead of the Philippines. Following this World Cup success he received an invitation to play in the 1978 Masters Tournament, where he missed the cut. In 1979, when players from Continental Europe became eligible to play in the Ryder Cup, Garrido and Ballesteros were the only two Continental Europe to compete.

Garrido played on the European Senior Tour from 1994. He was particularly successful from 1994 to 1999, never finishing lower than 11th in the Order of Merit, winning twice, the 1994 Shell Scottish Seniors Open and the 1997 Lawrence Batley Seniors, and being a runner-up 12 times.

== Personal life ==
Garrido's son Ignacio was a successful European Tour golfer; having won the 2003 Volvo PGA Championship.

In 1997 the Garridos became the second father and son combination to have played in the Ryder Cup after Percy and Peter Alliss. Antonio Garrido's younger brother Germán was also a European Tour golfer. The two of them were the first pair of brothers to win on the European Tour. They were later followed by Manuel and Seve Ballesteros, Francesco and Edoardo Molinari as well as Rasmus and Nicolai Højgaard.

== Professional wins (26) ==
=== European Tour wins (5) ===
No.	Date	Tournament	Winning score	Margin of victory	Runner(s)-up
1	15 Apr 1972	Spanish Open	+1 (77-71-71-74=293)	Playoff	(Spain) Valentín Barrios
2	23 Apr 1977	Madrid Open	−10 (71-68-68-71=278)	3 strokes	(Spain) Francisco Abreu
3	14 May 1977	Benson & Hedges International Open	−4 (72-68-72-68=280)	3 strokes	(New Zealand) Bob Charles
4	18 Apr 1982	Tunisian Open	−2 (71-73-70-72=286)	Playoff	(Spain) Manuel Calero
5	1 Jun 1986	London Standard Four Stars National Pro-Celebrity	−13 (69-67-71-68=275)	1 stroke	(Spain) José María Olazábal, (Northern Ireland) Ronan Rafferty

European Tour playoff record (2–1)

No.	Year	Tournament	Opponent(s)	Result
1	1972	Spanish Open	(Spain) Valentín Barrios	Won with birdie on third extra hole
2	1981	Swiss Open	(Zimbabwe) Tony Johnstone, (Spain) Manuel Piñero	Piñero won with birdie on first extra hole
3	1982	Tunisian Open	(Spain) Manuel Calero	Won with birdie on fifth extra hole

=== Other wins (11) ===
- 1966 Castilla Tournament (Spain)
- 1969 Spanish Professional Closed Championship
- 1975 Spanish Professional Closed Championship
- 1977 World Cup (with Seve Ballesteros)
- 1979 Spanish Professional Closed Championship
- 1980 Spanish Professional Closed Championship
- 1981 Spanish Professional Closed Championship
- 1983 Castilia Tournament (Spain)
- 1988 Castilia Tournament (Spain)
- 1989 Castilia Tournament (Spain)
- 1990 Castilia Tournament (Spain)

=== European Seniors Tour wins (2) ===
No.	Date	Tournament	Winning score	Margin of victory	Runner(s)-up
1	4 Sep 1994	Shell Scottish Seniors Open	−9 (66-68-67=201)	5 strokes	(Italy) Renato Campagnoli, (England) Neil Coles
2	5 Jul 1997	Lawrence Batley Seniors	−7 (70-66-68=206)	1 stroke	(Italy) Renato Campagnoli

European Seniors Tour playoff record (0–4)

No.	Year	Tournament	Opponent(s)	Result
1	1995	Forte PGA Seniors Championship	(England) John Morgan	Lost to par on first extra hole
2	1998	Beko Classic	(United States) Bob Lendzion, (South Africa) Bobby Verwey	Lendzion won with birdie on first extra hole
3	1998	Lawrence Batley Seniors	(South Africa) Bobby Verwey	Lost to par on first extra hole
3	1999	Greek Seniors Open	(Italy) Alberto Croce	Lost to birdie on fourth extra hole

=== Other senior wins (8) ===
- 1994 Champion Seniors Open (Australia), Argentine Senior PGA Championship
- 1995 Spanish Seniors Professional Closed Championship
- 1996 Spanish Seniors Professional Closed Championship
- 1997 Spanish Seniors Professional Closed Championship
- 1998 Spanish Seniors Professional Closed Championship
- 2000 Spanish Seniors Professional Closed Championship
- 2001 Spanish Seniors Professional Closed Championship

== Results in major championships ==
Tournament	1969	1970	1971	1972	1973	1974	1975	1976	1977	1978	1979
Masters Tournament										CUT	
The Open Championship	CUT	CUT		T59					CUT	T24	CUT

Tournament	1980	1981	1982	1983	1984	1985	1986
Masters Tournament							
The Open Championship	T51	CUT	CUT	CUT	CUT		CUT

Note: Garrido never played in the U.S. Open or PGA Championship.

Did not play

CUT = missed the half-way cut (3rd round cut in 1969, 1977 and 1982 Open Championships)
"T" indicates a tie for a place

== Team appearances ==
- Ryder Cup (representing Europe): 1979
- World Cup (representing Spain): 1977 (winners), 1978, 1979
- Double Diamond International (representing Continental Europe): 1976
- Philip Morris International (representing Spain): 1976
- Hennessy Cognac Cup (representing the Continent of Europe): 1976, 1978, 1980, 1982, (representing Spain) 1984
- Europcar Cup (representing Spain): 1986, 1987 (winners), 1988
- Praia d'El Rey European Cup: 1997 (winners), 1999
