= AGF Open =

Tournament information
- Location: France
- Established: 1988
- Course: La Grande Motte
- Par: 72
- Tour: European Tour
- Format: Strokeplay
- Prize fund: £200,000
- Month played: April
- Final year: 1990

Tournament record score
- Aggregate: 258 David Llewellyn (1988)
- To par: −14 as above

Final champion
- (Australia) Brett Ogle
- Location in France Location in Occitanie

The AGF Open was a European Tour golf tournament which was played in France from 1988 to 1990. The first event was held at Biarritz Golf Club and the other two at Golf de La Grande-Motte, near Montpellier. Its renewal in 1991 was cancelled due to sponsors being in dispute with the events promoters.

The most notable of the three winners was future European Ryder Cup captain Mark James of England. In 1990 the prize fund was £201,358, which was one of the smaller purses on the European Tour that year.

In 1988, David Llewellyn set a new European Tour record 72-hole aggregate of 258, surpassing the 259 set by Mark McNulty at the German Open in 1987. The record was equalled in 1990 by Ian Woosnam at the Monte Carlo Open and stood until August 2020, when it was broken by Andy Sullivan at Hanbury Manor Golf Club in the English Championship.

== Winners ==
Year	Winner	Score	To par	Margin of victory	Runner(s)-up	Venue	Ref.
AGF Open
1991	Cancelled						
1990	(Australia) Brett Ogle	278	−10	3 strokes	(England) Paul Curry (Scotland) Bill Longmuir	La Grande Motte	
1989	(England) Mark James	277	−11	3 strokes	(Wales) Mark Mouland	La Grande Motte	
AGF Biarritz Open
1988	(Wales) David Llewellyn	258	−14	7 strokes	(Republic of Ireland) Christy O'Connor Jnr	Biarritz	
