= Mercedes-Benz Championship =

There are two tournaments in men's professional golf called the Mercedes-Benz Championship.

- Mercedes-Benz Championship (European Tour), the name from 2007 of a European Tour event previously known as the German Masters
- Hyundai Tournament of Champions, the opening event of the PGA Tour season, known as the Mercedes-Benz Championship from 2007 to 2009
