= Peter Mitchell (golfer) =

English golfer (born 1958)

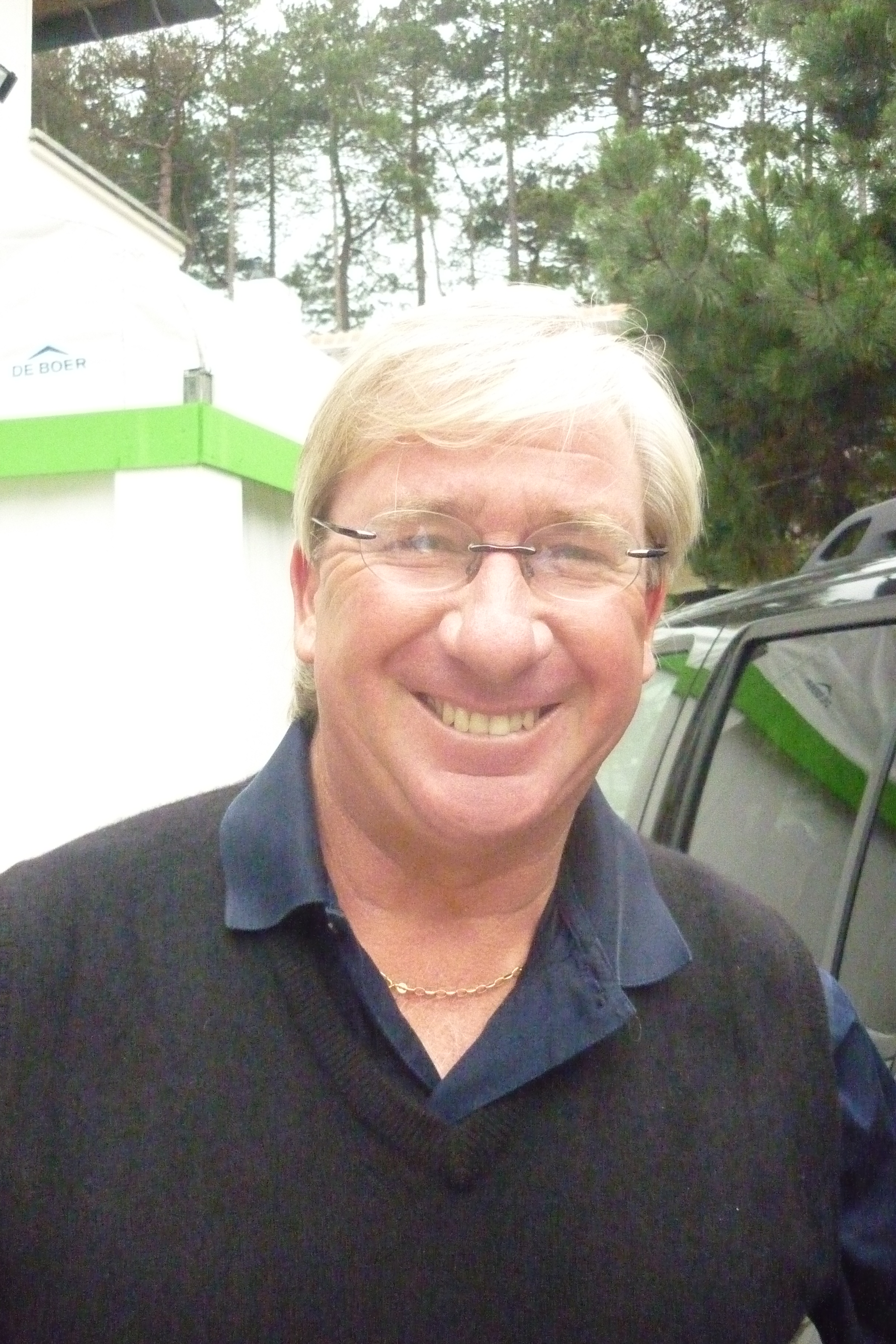

Personal information
- Full name: Peter Robert Mitchell
- Nationality: England
- Born: 6 April 1958 (age 68) London, England
- Height: 5 ft 8 in (1.73 m)
- Weight: 158 lb (72 kg; 11.3 st)

Career
- Sport: Golf
- Turned professional: 1974
- Current tour: European Senior Tour
- Former tour: European Tour
- Professional wins: 7
- Highest ranking: 74 (4 May 1997)

Number of wins by tour
- European Tour: 3
- European Senior Tour: 4

Best results in major championships
- Masters Tournament: DNP
- PGA Championship: DNP
- U.S. Open: DNP
- The Open Championship: T20: 1995

Peter Robert Mitchell (born 6 April 1958) is an English professional golfer.

== Career ==
In 1958, Mitchell was born in London.

Mitchell turned professional at an early age in 1974, working in a club job before embarking on a tournament career several years later. He made his first appearance on the European Tour in 1979 and his last in 2003. In the early years he had difficulties holding on to his tour card, but in the thirteen-year stretch from 1988 to 2000 he finished in the top eighty of the European Tour Order of Merit every season, with a highest ranking of 12th in 1996. That same year he made his only appearance in the World Cup of Golf. He won three European Tour events: the 1992 Mitsubishi Austrian Open, the 1997 Madeira Island Open and the 1998 Portuguese Open.

Upon turning 50 in 2008, Mitchell joined the European Seniors Tour. He won three times during his rookie season, finishing in 3rd place on the Order of Merit, and won again the following year.

== Professional wins (7) ==
=== European Tour wins (3) ===
No.	Date	Tournament	Winning score	Margin of victory	Runner(s)-up
1	14 Jun 1992	Mitsubishi Austrian Open	−17 (74-62-73-62=271)	1 stroke	(Australia) Peter Fowler, (England) David J. Russell, (England) Jamie Spence
2	30 Mar 1997	Madeira Island Open	−12 (70-63-71=204) (Note: Shortened to 54 holes due to weather.)	1 stroke	(Sweden) Freddie Jacobson
3	22 Mar 1998	Portuguese Open	−18 (67-70-67-70=274)	1 stroke	(England) David Gilford, (Sweden) Jarmo Sandelin

=== European Senior Tour wins (4) ===
No.	Date	Tournament	Winning score	Margin of victory	Runner(s)-up
1	15 Jun 2008	Ryder Cup Wales Seniors Open	−3 (72-70-71=213)	2 strokes	(Wales) Ian Woosnam
2	28 Sep 2008	Scottish Seniors Open	−9 (71-67-69=207)	2 strokes	(Scotland) Sam Torrance
3	12 Oct 2008	Lake Garda Italian Seniors Open	−13 (68-67-68=203)	1 stroke	(England) Gordon J. Brand, (Wales) Ian Woosnam
4	20 Sep 2009	Casa Serena Open	−13 (67-67-66=200)	3 strokes	(England) Glenn Ralph, (Australia) Peter Senior

== Results in major championships ==
Tournament	1979	1980	1981	1982	1983	1984	1985	1986	1987	1988
The Open Championship	CUT					CUT				71

Tournament	1989	1990	1991	1992	1993	1994	1995	1996	1997	1998
The Open Championship	CUT	CUT		T22	T73	CUT	T20	T27	T51	CUT

Note: Mitchell only played in The Open Championship.

Did not play

CUT = missed the half-way cut
"T" indicates a tie for a place

== Team appearances ==
- World Cup (representing England): 1996
