= Senior Open =

Senior Open may refer to:

- The Senior Open Championship, also known simply as the Senior Open
- Senior major golf championships
- AT&T Canada Senior Open Championship
- Azores Senior Open
- Dutch Senior Open
- English Seniors Open
- French Senior Open
- Irish Senior Open
- Italian Seniors Open
- Japan Senior Open Golf Championship
- United States Senior Open
- SBC Senior Open
- Scandinavian Senior Open
- Scottish Seniors Open
- Spanish Senior Open
- Swiss Seniors Open
- Wales Seniors Open
