= Casa Serena Open =

Tournament information
- Location: Kutná Hora, Czech Republic
- Established: 2008
- Course: Casa Serena Golf
- Par: 71
- Length: 6,770 yards (6,190 m)
- Tour: European Senior Tour
- Format: Stroke play
- Prize fund: £400,000
- Month played: September
- Final year: 2011

Tournament record score
- Aggregate: 198 Barry Lane (2011)
- To par: −15 as above

Final champion
- (England) Barry Lane
- Location in the Czech Republic

The Casa Serena Open was a men's golf tournament on the European Senior Tour. The tournament was held from 2008 to 2011 and was played at Casa Serena Golf, Vidice, near Kutná Hora in the Czech Republic. From 2008 to 2010 the prize money totalled €600,000 but was reduced to €400,000 in 2011.

== Winners ==
Year	Winner	Score	To par	Margin of victory	Runner(s)-up
2011	(England) Barry Lane	198	−15	2 strokes	(Australia) Peter Fowler
2010	(England) Gary Wolstenholme	200	−13	3 strokes	(Scotland) Gordon Brand Jnr
2009	(England) Peter Mitchell	200	−13	3 strokes	(England) Glenn Ralph (Australia) Peter Senior
2008	(Germany) Bernhard Langer	201	−12	3 strokes	(Wales) Ian Woosnam
