= Barcelona Open =

Barcelona Open is the name of two separate sporting events:

- Barcelona Open (golf)
- Barcelona Open (tennis)
