= 1988 European Tour =

Golf tour season

1988 European Tour season
- Duration: 10 March 1988 – 30 October 1988
- Number of official events: 30 (Note: One further tournament was scheduled but was cancelled.)
- Most wins: (Spain) Seve Ballesteros (5)
- Order of Merit: (Spain) Seve Ballesteros
- Golfer of the Year: (Spain) Seve Ballesteros
- Sir Henry Cotton Rookie of the Year: (Scotland) Colin Montgomerie

The 1988 European Tour, titled as the 1988 Volvo Tour for sponsorship reasons, was the 17th season of the European Tour, the main professional golf tour in Europe since its inaugural season in 1972.

== Volvo title sponsorship ==
In May 1987, it was announced that the tour had signed a title sponsorship agreement with Volvo, being renamed as the Volvo Tour. The agreement was reported to be worth £10,000,000 over five years.

== Changes for 1988 ==
The season was made up of 30 tournaments counting for the Order of Merit, and several non-counting "Approved Special Events".

There were several changes from the previous season, with the addition of the Open de Baleares, the Biarritz Open, the English Open and the Volvo Masters; the return of the Torras Hostench Barcelona Open, which had been cancelled due to bad weather in 1987; and the loss of the Lawrence Batley International. The Moroccan Open, originally scheduled to open the season, was initially postponed until October but ultimately cancelled.

== Schedule ==
The following table lists official events during the 1988 season.

Date	Tournament	Host country	Purse (£)	Winner (Note: The number in brackets after each winner's name is the number of European Tour events they had won up to and including that tournament. This information is only shown for European Tour members and are inclusive of the three United States-based major championships which were included on the schedule for the first time in 1998, with earlier editions having retrospectively been recognised as official tour wins.)	OWGR points	Notes
13 Mar	Mallorca Open de Baleares	Spain	200,000	(Spain) Seve Ballesteros (35)	20	New tournament
20 Mar	Torras Hostench Barcelona Open	Spain	200,000	(England) David Whelan (1)	18	
3 Apr	AGF Biarritz Open	France	150,000	(Wales) David Llewellyn (1)	16	New tournament
10 Apr	Masters Tournament	United States	US$1,000,000	(Scotland) Sandy Lyle (14)	100	Major championship (Note: Unofficial money event at the time, but retrospectively counted as an official win.)
17 Apr	Cannes Open	France	200,000	(Zimbabwe) Mark McNulty (7)	20	
24 Apr	Cepsa Madrid Open	Spain	200,000	(England) Derrick Cooper (1)	22	
1 May	Portuguese Open	Portugal	200,000	(Australia) Mike Harwood (1)	18	
8 May	Epson Grand Prix of Europe Matchplay Championship	Wales	275,000	(West Germany) Bernhard Langer (19)	40	Limited-field event
15 May	Peugeot Spanish Open	Spain	175,000	(England) Mark James (9)	38	
22 May	Lancia Italian Open	Italy	225,000	(Australia) Greg Norman (12)	24	
30 May	Volvo PGA Championship	England	300,000	(Wales) Ian Woosnam (9)	44	
5 Jun	Dunhill British Masters	England	250,000	(Scotland) Sandy Lyle (15)	42	
12 Jun	Wang Four Stars National Pro-Celebrity	England	200,000	(Australia) Rodger Davis (3)	20	Pro-Am
19 Jun	Volvo Belgian Open	Belgium	200,000	(Spain) José María Olazábal (3)	16	
19 Jun	U.S. Open	United States	US$1,000,000	(United States) Curtis Strange (n/a)	100	Major championship
26 Jun	Peugeot Open de France	France	275,000	(England) Nick Faldo (14)	40	
2 Jul	Monte Carlo Open	France	200,000	(Spain) José Rivero (3)	24	
9 Jul	Bell's Scottish Open	Scotland	250,000	(England) Barry Lane (1)	44	
17 Jul	The Open Championship	England	500,000	(Spain) Seve Ballesteros (36)	100	Major championship
24 Jul	KLM Dutch Open	Netherlands	250,000	(Wales) Mark Mouland (2)	34	
31 Jul	Scandinavian Enterprise Open	Sweden	250,000	(Spain) Seve Ballesteros (37)	34	
7 Aug	Benson & Hedges International Open	England	250,000	(England) Peter Baker (1)	38	
14 Aug	PLM Open	Sweden	200,000	(New Zealand) Frank Nobilo (1)	16	
14 Aug	PGA Championship	United States	US$1,000,000	(United States) Jeff Sluman (n/a)	100	Major championship
21 Aug	Carroll's Irish Open	Ireland	225,000	(Wales) Ian Woosnam (10)	42	
28 Aug	German Open	West Germany	275,000	(Spain) Seve Ballesteros (38)	38	
4 Sep	Ebel European Masters Swiss Open	Switzerland	400,000	(England) Chris Moody (1)	44	
11 Sep	Panasonic European Open	England	300,000	(Wales) Ian Woosnam (11)	42	
18 Sep	Trophée Lancôme	France	400,000	(Spain) Seve Ballesteros (39)	46	Limited-field event
25 Sep	German Masters	West Germany	300,000	(Spain) José María Olazábal (4)	44	
2 Oct	English Open	England	175,000	(England) Howard Clark (11)	16	New tournament
~~9 Oct~~; ~~6 Mar~~	Moroccan Open	Morocco	–	Cancelled	–	
23 Oct	BNP Jersey Open	Jersey	125,000	(Republic of Ireland) Des Smyth (6)	16	
30 Oct	Volvo Masters	Spain	350,000	(England) Nick Faldo (15)	44	New tournament Tour Championship

=== Unofficial events ===
The following events were sanctioned by the European Tour, but did not carry official money, nor were wins official.

Date	Tournament	Host country	Purse (£)	Winner(s)	OWGR points	Notes
10 Oct	Suntory World Match Play Championship	England	275,000	(Scotland) Sandy Lyle	32	Limited-field event
16 Oct	Dunhill Cup	Scotland	US$1,000,000	Team England	n/a	Team event
18 Oct	Equity & Law Challenge	England	125,000	(Northern Ireland) Ronan Rafferty	n/a	
27 Oct	UAP European Under-25 Championship	France	n/a	(France) Jean van de Velde	n/a	
6 Nov	Europcar Cup	France	n/a	Team Sweden	n/a	Team event
13 Nov	Benson & Hedges Trophy	Spain	200,000	(Zimbabwe) Mark McNulty and (France) Marie-Laure Taya	n/a	Team event
11 Dec	World Cup	Australia	US$750,000	(United States) Ben Crenshaw and (United States) Mark McCumber	n/a	Team event
11 Dec	World Cup Individual Trophy	Australia	US$750,000	(United States) Ben Crenshaw	n/a	
18 Dec	Kirin Cup	United States	US$1,000,000	Team USA	n/a	Team event

== Order of Merit ==
The Order of Merit was titled as the Volvo Order of Merit and was based on prize money won during the season, calculated in Pound sterling.

Position	Player	Prize money (£)
1	(Spain) Seve Ballesteros	451,560
2	(England) Nick Faldo	347,971
3	(Spain) José María Olazábal	285,964
4	(Wales) Ian Woosnam	234,991
5	(Scotland) Sandy Lyle	186,018
6	(Zimbabwe) Mark McNulty	180,992
7	(Republic of Ireland) Des Smyth	171,951
8	(England) Mark James	152,900
9	(Northern Ireland) Ronan Rafferty	132,395
10	(Spain) José Rivero	131,079

== Awards ==
Award	Winner	Ref.
Golfer of the Year	(Spain) Seve Ballesteros	
Sir Henry Cotton Rookie of the Year	(Scotland) Colin Montgomerie	
