= 2009 European Senior Tour =

Golf tour season

2009 European Senior Tour season
- Duration: 27 February 2009 – 8 November 2009
- Number of official events: 16
- Most wins: (England) Carl Mason (2)
- Order of Merit: (Scotland) Sam Torrance
- Rookie of the Year: (Australia) Mike Harwood

The 2009 European Senior Tour was the 18th season of the European Senior Tour, the main professional golf tour in Europe for men aged 50 and over.

== Schedule ==
The following table lists official events during the 2009 season.

Date	Tournament	Host country	Purse (€)	Winner (Note: The number in brackets after each winner's name is the number of European Senior Tour events they had won up to and including that tournament. This information is only shown for European Senior Tour members.)	Notes
1 Mar	Aberdeen Brunei Senior Masters	Brunei	400,000	(United States) Mike Cunning (1)	New tournament
20 Mar	DGM Barbados Open	Barbados	£145,000	(Scotland) Sam Torrance (11)	
10 May	Son Gual Mallorca Senior Open	Spain	300,000	(England) Mark James (2)	New tournament
24 May	Senior PGA Championship	United States	US$2,000,000	(United States) Michael Allen (n/a)	Senior major championship
7 Jun	Irish Seniors Open	Ireland	350,000	(Wales) Ian Woosnam (3)	
14 Jun	Jersey Seniors Classic	Jersey	£140,000	(Jamaica) Delroy Cambridge (5)	
21 Jun	Ryder Cup Wales Seniors Open	Wales	£500,000	(South Africa) Bertus Smit (1)	
28 Jun	De Vere Collection PGA Seniors Championship	England	£250,000	(England) Carl Mason (21)	
26 Jul	The Senior Open Championship	England	US$2,000,000	(United States) Loren Roberts (n/a)	Senior major championship
2 Aug	U.S. Senior Open	United States	US$2,600,000	(United States) Fred Funk (n/a)	Senior major championship (Note: Official win; unofficial money.)
9 Aug	Bad Ragaz PGA Seniors Open	Switzerland	220,000	(South Africa) John Bland (2)	
23 Aug	Cleveland Golf/Srixon Scottish Senior Open	Scotland	£225,000	(England) Glenn Ralph (1)	
6 Sep	Travis Perkins plc Senior Masters	England	£250,000	(Zimbabwe) Tony Johnstone (2)	
20 Sep	Casa Serena Open	Czech Republic	600,000	(England) Peter Mitchell (4)	
18 Oct	Benahavis Senior Masters	Spain	180,000	(England) Carl Mason (22)	New tournament
8 Nov	OKI Castellón Senior Tour Championship	Spain	400,000	(Australia) Mike Harwood (1)	Tour Championship

== Order of Merit ==
The Order of Merit was based on prize money won during the season, calculated in Euros.

Position	Player	Prize money (€)
1	(Scotland) Sam Torrance	170,696
2	(Wales) Ian Woosnam	167,316
3	(England) Carl Mason	157,918
4	(England) Glenn Ralph	150,723
5	(Paraguay) Ángel Franco	136,467

== Awards ==
Award	Winner	Ref.
Rookie of the Year	(Australia) Mike Harwood	
