= 1997 Volvo PGA Championship =

Tournament information
- Dates: 23–26 May 1997
- Location: Virginia Water, Surrey, England; 51.40°N 0.59°W
- Courses: Wentworth Club; West Course
- Tour: European Tour

Statistics
- Par: 72
- Field: 160 players, 79 after cut
- Cut: 147 (+3)
- Prize fund: €1,122,918
- Winner's share: €256,676

Champion
- (Wales) Ian Woosnam
- 275 (−13)

Location map
- Location in England Location in Surrey

The 1997 Volvo PGA Championship was the 43rd edition of the Volvo PGA Championship, an annual professional golf tournament on the European Tour. It was held 23–26 May at the West Course of Wentworth Club in Virginia Water, Surrey, England, a suburb southwest of London.

Ian Woosnam won his second Volvo PGA Championship with a two stroke victory over Darren Clarke, Ernie Els and Nick Faldo.

== Round summaries ==
=== First round ===
Friday, 23 May 1997

Place	Player	Score	To par
T1	(Northern Ireland) Darren Clarke	66	−6
T1	(Republic of Ireland) Eamonn Darcy	66	−6
T3	(England) David Gilford	67	−5
T3	(Sweden) Robert Karlsson	67	−5
T3	(Germany) Bernhard Langer	67	−5
T3	(Scotland) Gary Orr	67	−5
T3	(England) Andrew Sherborne	67	−5
T3	(Wales) Ian Woosnam	67	−5
T9	(Denmark) Thomas Bjørn	68	−4
T9	(England) David Carter	68	−4
T9	(France) Marc Farry	68	−4
T9	(New Zealand) Frank Nobilo	68	−4

=== Second round ===
Saturday, 24 May 1997

Place	Player	Score	To par
1	(Wales) Ian Woosnam	67-68=135	−9
T2	(England) Nick Faldo	70-67=137	−7
T2	(England) David Gilford	67-70=137	−7
4	(Scotland) Colin Montgomerie	69-69=138	−6
T5	(Trinidad and Tobago) Stephen Ames	70-69=139	−5
T5	(New Zealand) Frank Nobilo	68-71=139	−5
T7	(Argentina) Ángel Cabrera	73-67=140	−4
T7	(Northern Ireland) Darren Clarke	66-74=140	−4
T7	(South Africa) Ernie Els	69-71=140	−4
T10	(Republic of Ireland) Eamonn Darcy	66-75=141	−3
T10	(England) Gary Emerson	71-70=141	−3
T10	(Sweden) Klas Eriksson	70-71=141	−3
T10	(England) Barry Lane	69-72=141	−3
T10	(Argentina) Eduardo Romero	71-70=141	−3
T10	(Republic of Ireland) Philip Walton	69-72=141	−3

=== Third round ===
Sunday, 25 May 1997

Place	Player	Score	To par
1	(Wales) Ian Woosnam	67-68-67=205	−11
2	(Northern Ireland) Darren Clarke	66-74-66=206	−10
T3	(South Africa) Ernie Els	69-71-67=207	−9
T3	(England) Nick Faldo	70-67-70=207	−9
T5	(Trinidad and Tobago) Stephen Ames	70-69-70=209	−7
T5	(England) David Gilford	67-70-72=209	−7
T7	(Argentina) Ángel Cabrera	73-67-70=210	−6
T7	(Sweden) Dennis Edlund	70-72-68=210	−6
T7	(England) Barry Lane	69-72-69=210	−6
T10	(Argentina) Eduardo Romero	71-70-70=211	−5
T10	(Republic of Ireland) Philip Walton	69-72-70=211	−5

=== Final round ===
Monday, 26 May 1997

Place	Player	Score	To par	Money (€)
1	(Wales) Ian Woosnam	67-68-70-70=275	−13	256,676
T2	(Northern Ireland) Darren Clarke	66-74-66-71=277	−11	114,833
T2	(South Africa) Ernie Els	69-71-67-70=277	−11	114,833
T2	(England) Nick Faldo	70-67-70-70=277	−11	114,833
5	(Scotland) Colin Montgomerie	69-69-76-64=278	−10	65,296
T6	(Argentina) Ángel Cabrera	73-67-70-69=279	−9	50,050
T6	(England) David Gilford	67-70-72-70=279	−9	50,050
8	(Sweden) Dennis Edlund	70-72-68-70=280	−8	38,500
9	(England) Lee Westwood	70-72-70-69=281	−7	34,342
10	(England) Barry Lane	69-72-69-72=282	−6	30,800
