= Parkridge Polish Seniors Championship =

Tournament information
- Location: Krzeszowice, Poland
- Established: 2008
- Courses: Krakow Valley Golf and Country Club
- Par: 72
- Length: 6,842 yards (6,256 m)
- Tour: European Seniors Tour
- Format: Stroke play
- Prize fund: €280,000
- Month played: May/June
- Final year: 2008

Tournament record score
- Aggregate: 202 Ian Woosnam (2008)
- To par: −14 as above

Final champion
- (Wales) Ian Woosnam
- Location in Poland

The Parkridge Polish Seniors Open was a men's senior (over 50) professional golf tournament on the European Seniors Tour, held at the Krakow Valley Golf and Country Club near Krzeszowice in southern Poland. It was held just once, in 2008, and was won by Ian Woosnam who finished a shot ahead of Domingo Hospital. The total prize fund was €280,000 with the winner receiving €42,000.

== Winners ==
Year	Winner	Score	To par	Margin of victory	Runner-up
2008	(Wales) Ian Woosnam	202	−14	1 stroke	(Spain) Domingo Hospital
