= John E. Morgan =

English golfer (born 1977)

Personal information
- Full name: John Edward Morgan
- Nationality: England
- Born: 19 December 1977 (age 48) Bristol, England
- Height: 1.88 m (6 ft 2 in)
- Life partner: Vanessa
- Children: 1

Career
- Sport: Golf
- Turned professional: 2002
- Former tours: PGA Tour; European Tour; Challenge Tour; PGA EuroPro Tour
- Professional wins: 3

Number of wins by tour
- Challenge Tour: 1
- Other: 2

John Edward Morgan (born 19 December 1977) is an English former professional golfer. He has previously played on the PGA Tour, European Tour and the Challenge Tour. He now works as an on-course analyst for the Sky Sports European Tour broadcast.

== Career ==
After being largely overlooked as an amateur, Morgan turned professional in 2002, and won the Charles Church European Challenge Tour Championship on his way to graduating from the Challenge Tour to the European Tour. At the suggestion of his manager, Eddie Hearn, Morgan entered the PGA Tour qualifying school, and survived all three stages, finishing tied for 11th at the school finals to earn playing privileges in the United States. Morgan is only the second player to win full cards for both tours in his rookie season — the first was Richie Coughlan in 1997. Deciding to concentrate on the PGA Tour, Morgan lost a playoff to Mark Hensby at the John Deere Classic in 2004. This was Morgan's best PGA Tour result.

Morgan lost all playing privileges at the end of 2005, and returned to the Challenge Tour. A 17th place finish on the 2008 money list earned him a return to the European Tour the following season, but he could not hold on to his status, and returned once more to the Challenge Tour in 2010.

== Professional wins (3) ==
=== Challenge Tour wins (1) ===
| No. | Date | Tournament | Winning score | Margin of victory | Runner-up |
|---|---|---|---|---|---|
| 1 | 28 Jul 2002 | Charles Church European Challenge Tour Championship | −10 (66-68-73-71=278) | Playoff | (England) David Geall |

Challenge Tour playoff record (1–0)

| No. | Year | Tournament | Opponent | Result |
|---|---|---|---|---|
| 1 | 2002 | Charles Church European Challenge Tour Championship | (England) David Geall | Won with par on first extra hole |

=== PGA EuroPro Tour wins (2) ===
| No. | Date | Tournament | Winning score | Margin of victory | Runners-up |
|---|---|---|---|---|---|
| 1 | 20 Jul 2006 | Squibb Demolition International Open | | | |
| 2 | 6 Oct 2006 | MCP Classic | −11 (66-63-70=199) | 7 strokes | (England) Kevin Harper, (England) Mark Smith |

== Playoff record ==
PGA Tour playoff record (0–1)

| No. | Year | Tournament | Opponent | Result |
|---|---|---|---|---|
| 1 | 2004 | John Deere Classic | (Australia) Mark Hensby | Lost to par on second extra hole |

== See also ==
- 2002 PGA Tour Qualifying School graduates
- 2008 Challenge Tour graduates
