= Trophée Lancôme =

Professional golf tournament

Tournament information
- Location: Paris, France
- Established: 1970
- Course: Saint-Nom-la-Bretèche
- Par: 72
- Length: 6,902 yards (6,311 m)
- Tour: European Tour
- Format: Stroke play
- Prize fund: €1,800,000
- Month played: September
- Final year: 2003

Tournament record score
- Aggregate: 263 Vijay Singh (1994)
- To par: −24 Ian Woosnam (1987)

Final champion
- (South Africa) Retief Goosen
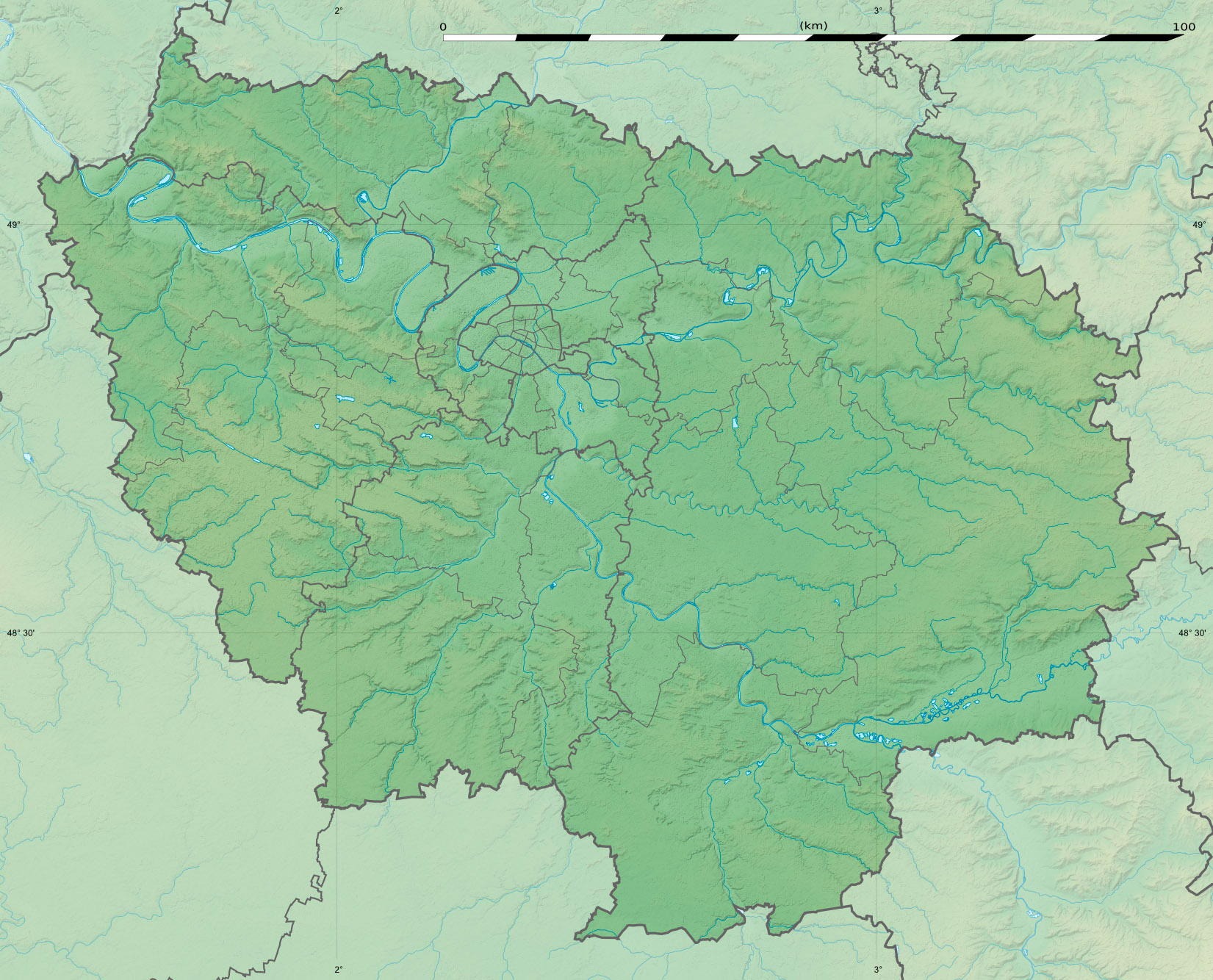
- Location in France Location in Île-de-France

The Trophée Lancôme was a professional golf tournament which was staged in Saint-Nom-la-Bretèche, France from 1970 to 2003.

Gaëtan Mourgue D'Algue, a French golf enthusiast from Saint-Nom-la-Bretèche, hoped to popularize the then little-known sport of Golf in France during the early 1960s. With Dominique Motte, he suggested the creation of a new championship trophy to Pierre Menet, the chairman of the Lancôme Company. Their goal was originally to bring together eight of the best players in the world. Saint-Nom-La-Bretèche had hosted the 1963 Canada Cup and the Open de France in 1965 and 1969.

The tournament started in 1970 as the "Tournament of Champions" but from 1971 it was called the "Trophée Lancôme", named after Menet's company. It began as an unofficial event, in that it was not part of a tour schedule, but it was backed by the Fédération Française de Golf and by preeminent sports agent Mark McCormack who arranged for some of the world's top players to participate. The 1970 and 1971 the tournament was played over three rounds (54 holes), but starting in 1972 it was played over four rounds (72 holes). Originally contested by 8 invited players, the field was increased to 12 in 1979.

From 1982 onwards it was an official money event on the European Tour, with an increased field size. In 1986 Bernhard Langer and Seve Ballesteros were declared joint winners as they were level after four playoff holes when darkness fell. The tournament ceased operation after 2003.

== Winners ==
Year	Winner	Score	To par	Margin of victory	Runner(s)-up	Ref.
2003	(South Africa) Retief Goosen (2)	266	−18	4 strokes	(Republic of Ireland) Paul McGinley	
2002	(Germany) Alex Čejka	272	−12	2 strokes	(Spain) Carlos Rodiles	
2001	(Spain) Sergio García	266	−18	1 stroke	(South Africa) Retief Goosen	
2000	(South Africa) Retief Goosen	271	−13	1 stroke	(New Zealand) Michael Campbell (Northern Ireland) Darren Clarke	
1999	(Sweden) Pierre Fulke	270	−14	1 stroke	(Spain) Ignacio Garrido	
1998	(Spain) Miguel Ángel Jiménez	273	−11	2 strokes	(United States) David Duval (United States) Mark O'Meara (Sweden) Jarmo Sandelin (New Zealand) Greg Turner	
1997	(United States) Mark O'Meara	271	−13	1 stroke	(Sweden) Jarmo Sandelin	
1996	(Sweden) Jesper Parnevik	268	−12	5 strokes	(Scotland) Colin Montgomerie	
1995	(Scotland) Colin Montgomerie	269	−11	1 stroke	(Scotland) Sam Torrance	
1994	(Fiji) Vijay Singh	263	−17	1 stroke	(Spain) Miguel Ángel Jiménez	
1993	(Wales) Ian Woosnam (2)	267	−13	2 strokes	(Scotland) Sam Torrance	
1992	(England) Mark Roe	267	−13	2 strokes	(Argentina) Vicente Fernández	
1991	(New Zealand) Frank Nobilo	267	−13	1 stroke	(Australia) Ian Baker-Finch (Australia) Peter Fowler (England) David Gilford (England) Jamie Spence	
1990	(Spain) José María Olazábal	269	−11	1 stroke	(Scotland) Colin Montgomerie	
1989	(Argentina) Eduardo Romero	266	−22	1 stroke	(West Germany) Bernhard Langer (Spain) José María Olazábal	
1988	(Spain) Seve Ballesteros (4)	269	−15	4 strokes	(Spain) José María Olazábal	
1987	(Wales) Ian Woosnam	264	−24	2 strokes	(Zimbabwe) Mark McNulty	
1986	(Spain) Seve Ballesteros (3) (West Germany) Bernhard Langer	274	−14	Title shared (Note: Title shared when darkness ended play with Ballesteros and Langer still tied after four holes of a sudden-death playoff.)		
1985	(Zimbabwe) Nick Price	275	−13	Playoff	(England) Mark James	
1984	(Scotland) Sandy Lyle	278	−10	Playoff	(Spain) Seve Ballesteros	
1983	(Spain) Seve Ballesteros (2)	269	−19	4 strokes	(United States) Corey Pavin	
1982	(Australia) David Graham (2)	276	−12	2 strokes	(Spain) Seve Ballesteros	
1981	(Australia) David Graham	280	−8	5 strokes	(Japan) Isao Aoki (Scotland) Sandy Lyle	
1980	(United States) Lee Trevino (2)	280	−8	4 strokes	(United States) Gary Hallberg	
1979	(United States) Johnny Miller (2)	281	−7	3 strokes	(Scotland) Sandy Lyle (United States) Lee Trevino	
1978	(United States) Lee Trevino	272	−16	5 strokes	(South Africa) Gary Player (United States) Tom Watson	
1977	(Australia) Graham Marsh	273	−15	Playoff	(Spain) Seve Ballesteros	
1976	(Spain) Seve Ballesteros	283	−5	1 stroke	(United States) Arnold Palmer	
1975	(South Africa) Gary Player	278	−10	6 strokes	(United States) Lanny Wadkins	
1974	(United States) Billy Casper	283	−5	3 strokes	(United States) Hale Irwin	
1973	(United States) Johnny Miller	277	−11	3 strokes	(Spain) Valentín Barrios	
1972	(United States) Tommy Aaron	279	−9	3 strokes	(United States) Tom Weiskopf	
1971	(United States) Arnold Palmer	202	−14	2 strokes	(South Africa) Gary Player	
1970	(England) Tony Jacklin	206	−10	1 stroke	(United States) Arnold Palmer (Spain) Ramón Sota	

== Multiple winners ==
- 4 wins: Seve Ballesteros (including one shared)
- 2 wins: Retief Goosen, David Graham, Lee Trevino, Ian Woosnam
