= 1986 European Tour =

Golf tour season

1986 European Tour season
- Duration: 10 April 1986 – 26 October 1986
- Number of official events: 26 (Note: One further tournament was scheduled but was cancelled.)
- Most wins: (Spain) Seve Ballesteros (6)
- Order of Merit: (Spain) Seve Ballesteros
- Golfer of the Year: (Spain) Seve Ballesteros
- Sir Henry Cotton Rookie of the Year: (Spain) José María Olazábal

The 1986 European Tour, titled as the 1986 PGA European Tour, was the 15th season of the European Tour, the main professional golf tour in Europe since its inaugural season in 1972.

== Changes for 1986 ==
There were several changes from the previous season, with the addition of the Epson Grand Prix of Europe Matchplay Championship and the PLM Open; the return of the Bell's Scottish Open, as the Glasgow Open was rebranded, and the loss of the GSI L'Equipe Open.

Before the season started, the Tunisian Open, scheduled as the opening event opposite the Masters Tournament, was cancelled after sponsors withdrew funding for the event.

=== Order of Merit minimum tournaments ===
In 1986 the minimum number of tournaments needed to qualify for the Order of Merit was increased from seven to nine.

== Schedule ==
The following table lists official events during the 1986 season.

Date	Tournament	Host country	Purse (£)	Winner (Note: The number in brackets after each winner's name is the number of European Tour events they had won up to and including that tournament. This information is only shown for European Tour members and are inclusive of the three United States-based major championships which were included on the schedule for the first time in 1998, with earlier editions having retrospectively been recognised as official tour wins.)	OWGR points	Notes
~~13 Apr~~	Tunisian Open	Tunisia	–	Cancelled	–	
13 Apr	Masters Tournament	United States	US$785,000	(United States) Jack Nicklaus (n/a)	100	Major championship (Note: Unofficial money event at the time, but retrospectively counted as an official win.)
20 Apr	Suze Open	France	100,000	(South Africa) John Bland (2)	20	
27 Apr	Cepsa Madrid Open	Spain	125,000	(England) Howard Clark (7)	20	
4 May	Italian Open	Italy	100,000	(Northern Ireland) David Feherty (1)	20	
11 May	Epson Grand Prix of Europe Matchplay Championship	Wales	125,000	(Sweden) Ove Sellberg (1)	20	New tournament Limited-field event
18 May	Peugeot Spanish Open	Spain	150,000	(England) Howard Clark (8)	40	
26 May	Whyte & Mackay PGA Championship	England	200,000	(Australia) Rodger Davis (2)	40	
1 Jun	London Standard Four Stars National Pro-Celebrity	England	150,000	(Spain) Antonio Garrido (5)	20	Pro-Am
8 Jun	Dunhill British Masters	England	200,000	(Spain) Seve Ballesteros (28)	40	
15 Jun	Jersey Open	Jersey	80,000	(England) John Morgan (1)	20	
15 Jun	U.S. Open	United States	US$700,000	(United States) Raymond Floyd (n/a)	100	Major championship
22 Jun	Carroll's Irish Open	Ireland	200,000	(Spain) Seve Ballesteros (29)	40	
28 Jun	Johnnie Walker Monte Carlo Open	France	150,000	(Spain) Seve Ballesteros (30)	20	
7 Jul	Peugeot Open de France	France	125,000	(Spain) Seve Ballesteros (31)	40	
12 Jul	Car Care Plan International	England	100,000	(Wales) Mark Mouland (1)	20	
20 Jul	The Open Championship	Scotland	600,000	(Australia) Greg Norman (10)	100	Major championship
27 Jul	KLM Dutch Open	Netherlands	150,000	(Spain) Seve Ballesteros (32)	40	
3 Aug	Scandinavian Enterprise Open	Sweden	150,000	(New Zealand) Greg Turner (1)	40	
10 Aug	PLM Open	Sweden	125,000	(Australia) Peter Senior (1)	20	New to European Tour
10 Aug	PGA Championship	United States	US$800,000	(United States) Bob Tway (n/a)	100	Major championship
17 Aug	Benson & Hedges International Open	England	175,000	(England) Mark James (8)	40	
24 Aug	Bell's Scottish Open	Scotland	125,000	(Northern Ireland) David Feherty (2)	20	
31 Aug	German Open	West Germany	175,000	(West Germany) Bernhard Langer (15)	24	
7 Sep	Ebel European Masters Swiss Open	Switzerland	275,000	(Spain) José María Olazábal (1)	40	
14 Sep	Panasonic European Open	England	200,000	(Australia) Greg Norman (11)	44	
21 Sep	Lawrence Batley International T.P.C.	England	125,000	(Wales) Ian Woosnam (4)	20	
12 Oct	Sanyo Open	Spain	175,000	(Spain) José María Olazábal (2)	40	
19 Oct	Trophée Lancôme	France	175,000	(Spain) Seve Ballesteros (33) (West Germany) Bernhard Langer (16)	34	Title shared (Note: Langer and Ballesteros were declared joint winners as they remained tied after failing light caused play to halt after four holes of a playoff.); Limited-field event
26 Oct	Portuguese Open	Portugal	100,000	(Zimbabwe) Mark McNulty (3)	20	

=== Unofficial events ===
The following events were sanctioned by the European Tour, but did not carry official money, nor were wins official.

Date	Tournament	Host country	Purse (£)	Winner(s)	OWGR points	Notes
28 Sep	Dunhill Cup	Scotland	US$1,000,000	Team Australia	n/a	Team event
5 Oct	Suntory World Match Play Championship	England	175,000	(Australia) Greg Norman	32	Limited-field event

== Order of Merit ==
The Order of Merit was titled as the Epson Order of Merit and was based on prize money won during the season, calculated in Pound sterling.

Position	Player	Prize money (£)
1	(Spain) Seve Ballesteros	242,209
2	(Spain) José María Olazábal	136,775
3	(England) Howard Clark	121,903
4	(Wales) Ian Woosnam	111,799
5	(England) Gordon J. Brand	106,314
6	(Zimbabwe) Mark McNulty	101,327
7	(Australia) Rodger Davis	95,429
8	(Sweden) Anders Forsbrand	84,706
9	(Northern Ireland) Ronan Rafferty	80,336
10	(Scotland) Gordon Brand Jnr	78,639

== Awards ==
Award	Winner	Ref.
Golfer of the Year	(Spain) Seve Ballesteros	
Sir Henry Cotton Rookie of the Year	(Spain) José María Olazábal	
