= Azores Senior Open =

Tournament information
- Location: Ponta Delgada, Azores, Portugal
- Established: 2008
- Course: Batalha Golf Course
- Par: 72
- Length: 6,883 yards (6,294 m)
- Tour: European Seniors Tour
- Format: Stroke play
- Prize fund: €325,000
- Month played: March
- Final year: 2008

Tournament record score
- Aggregate: 211 Stewart Ginn (2008)
- To par: −5 as above

Final champion
- (Australia) Stewart Ginn
- Location in Azores

The Azores Senior Open was a men's senior (over 50) professional golf tournament on the European Seniors Tour, held at the Batalha Golf Course in Ponta Delgada on São Miguel Island in the Azores. It was held just once, in March 2008, and was won by Stewart Ginn who finished two shots ahead of Nick Job. The total prize fund was €325,000 with the winner receiving €48,750.

== Winners ==
Year	Winner	Score	To par	Margin of victory	Runner-up
2008	(Australia) Stewart Ginn	211	−5	2 strokes	(England) Nick Job
