= 1987 European Tour =

Golf tour season

1987 European Tour season
- Duration: 19 March 1987 – 1 November 1987
- Number of official events: 27 (Note: One further tournament was scheduled but was cancelled.)
- Most wins: (Wales) Ian Woosnam (4)
- Order of Merit: (Wales) Ian Woosnam
- Golfer of the Year: (Wales) Ian Woosnam
- Sir Henry Cotton Rookie of the Year: (England) Peter Baker

The 1987 European Tour, titled as the 1987 PGA European Tour, was the 16th season of the European Tour, the main professional golf tour in Europe since its inaugural season in 1972.

== Changes for 1987 ==
The season was made up of 27 tournaments counting for the Order of Merit, and several non-counting "Approved Special Events".

There were several changes from the previous season, with the addition of the Moroccan Open and the German Masters, the return of the Volvo Belgian Open and the loss of the Car Care Plan International.

== Schedule ==
The following table lists official events during the 1987 season.

Date	Tournament	Host country	Purse (£)	Winner (Note: The number in brackets after each winner's name is the number of European Tour events they had won up to and including that tournament. This information is only shown for European Tour members and are inclusive of the three United States-based major championships which were included on the schedule for the first time in 1998, with earlier editions having retrospectively been recognised as official tour wins.)	OWGR points	Notes
22 Mar	Moroccan Open	Morocco	175,000	(England) Howard Clark (9)	16	New tournament
12 Apr	Jersey Open	Jersey	100,000	(Wales) Ian Woosnam (5)	16	
12 Apr	Masters Tournament	United States	US$875,000	(United States) Larry Mize (n/a)	100	Major championship (Note: Unofficial money event at the time, but retrospectively counted as an official win.)
19 Apr	Suze Open	France	150,000	(Spain) Seve Ballesteros (34)	22	
26 Apr	Cepsa Madrid Open	Spain	175,000	(Wales) Ian Woosnam (6)	22	
3 May	Lancia Italian Open	Italy	150,000	(Scotland) Sam Torrance (12)	18	
10 May	Epson Grand Prix of Europe Matchplay Championship	Wales	250,000	(Sweden) Mats Lanner (1)	42	Limited-field event
17 May	Peugeot Spanish Open	Spain	175,000	(England) Nick Faldo (12)	42	
25 May	Whyte & Mackay PGA Championship	England	225,000	(West Germany) Bernhard Langer (17)	44	
31 May	London Standard Four Stars National Pro-Celebrity	England	150,000	(Zimbabwe) Mark McNulty (4)	16	Pro-Am
7 Jun	Dunhill British Masters	England	200,000	(Zimbabwe) Mark McNulty (5)	40	
13 Jun	Peugeot Open de France	France	250,000	(Spain) José Rivero (2)	38	
20 Jun	Volvo Belgian Open	Belgium	150,000	(Republic of Ireland) Eamonn Darcy (3)	14	
21 Jun	U.S. Open	United States	US$825,000	(United States) Scott Simpson (n/a)	100	Major championship
27 Jun	Johnnie Walker Monte Carlo Open	France	200,000	(Australia) Peter Senior (2)	22	
5 Jul	Carroll's Irish Open	Ireland	225,000	(West Germany) Bernhard Langer (18)	44	
11 Jul	Bell's Scottish Open	Scotland	200,000	(Wales) Ian Woosnam (7)	44	
19 Jul	The Open Championship	Scotland	650,000	(England) Nick Faldo (13)	100	Major championship
26 Jul	KLM Dutch Open	Netherlands	175,000	(Scotland) Gordon Brand Jnr (5)	40	
2 Aug	Scandinavian Enterprise Open	Sweden	200,000	(Scotland) Gordon Brand Jnr (6)	34	
9 Aug	PLM Open	Sweden	150,000	(England) Howard Clark (10)	16	
9 Aug	PGA Championship	United States	US$900,000	(United States) Larry Nelson (n/a)	100	Major championship
16 Aug	Benson & Hedges International Open	England	200,000	(Australia) Noel Ratcliffe (2)	42	
23 Aug	Lawrence Batley International	England	150,000	(United States) Mark O'Meara (n/a)	22	
30 Aug	German Open	West Germany	275,000	(Zimbabwe) Mark McNulty (6)	38	
6 Sep	Ebel European Masters Swiss Open	Switzerland	350,000	(Sweden) Anders Forsbrand (1)	42	
13 Sep	Panasonic European Open	England	225,000	(England) Paul Way (3)	48	
20 Sep	Trophée Lancôme	France	300,000	(Wales) Ian Woosnam (8)	46	Limited-field event
11 Oct	German Masters	West Germany	275,000	(Scotland) Sandy Lyle (13)	46	New tournament
~~25 Oct~~	Barcelona Open	Spain	–	Cancelled (Note: Tournament initially postponed and then later cancelled due to bad weather rendering the course unplayable.)	–	
1 Nov	Portuguese Open	Portugal	100,000	(England) Robert Lee (2)	12	

=== Unofficial events ===
The following events were sanctioned by the European Tour, but did not carry official money, nor were wins official.

Date	Tournament	Host country	Purse (£)	Winner(s)	OWGR points	Notes
27 Sep	Vernons Open	England	60,000	(Wales) David Llewellyn	12	
27 Sep	Ryder Cup	United States	n/a	Team Europe	n/a	Team event
4 Oct	Dunhill Cup	Scotland	US$1,000,000	Team England	n/a	Team event
13 Oct	Equity & Law Challenge	England	120,000	(England) Barry Lane	n/a	New tournament
18 Oct	Suntory World Match Play Championship	England	275,000	(Wales) Ian Woosnam	32	Limited-field event
8 Nov	Kirin Cup	Japan	US$950,000	Team USA	n/a	Team event
8 Nov	Kirin Cup Individual Trophy	Japan	n/a	(United States) Tom Kite	n/a	
21 Nov	World Cup	United States	US$750,000	David Llewellyn and (Wales) Ian Woosnam	n/a	Team event
21 Nov	World Cup Individual Trophy	United States	US$750,000	(Wales) Ian Woosnam	n/a	

== Order of Merit ==
The Order of Merit was titled as the Epson Order of Merit and was based on prize money won during the season, calculated in Pound sterling.

Position	Player	Prize money (£)
1	(Wales) Ian Woosnam	253,717
2	(Zimbabwe) Mark McNulty	189,304
3	(England) Nick Faldo	181,833
4	(Scotland) Gordon Brand Jnr	147,787
5	(West Germany) Bernhard Langer	141,394
6	(Spain) Seve Ballesteros	138,843
7	(Australia) Peter Senior	126,091
8	(Australia) Rodger Davis	122,754
9	(Scotland) Sam Torrance	122,556
10	(England) Howard Clark	122,535

== Awards ==
Award	Winner	Ref.
Golfer of the Year	(Wales) Ian Woosnam	
Sir Henry Cotton Rookie of the Year	(England) Peter Baker	
