= 2006 PGA EuroPro Tour =

Golf tour season

2006 PGA EuroPro Tour season
- Duration: 26 April 2006 – 23 October 2006
- Number of official events: 16
- Most wins: (England) John E. Morgan (2)
- Order of Merit: (England) Kevin Harper

The 2006 PGA EuroPro Tour was the fifth season of the PGA EuroPro Tour, a third-tier tour recognised by the European Tour.

== Schedule ==
The following table lists official events during the 2006 season.

Date	Tournament	Location	Purse (£)	Winner (Note: The number in brackets after each winner's name is the number of PGA EuroPro Tour events they had won up to and including that tournament. It is rare for someone to accumulate many wins on the PGA EuroPro Tour as success at this level usually leads to promotion to the Challenge Tour.)
28 Apr	Wensum Valley International Open	Norfolk	40,000	(England) Matthew Woods (1)
13 May	Verde Golf Azores Championship	Portugal	€75,000	(Northern Ireland) Damian Mooney (1)
18 May	Oceânico International Open	Portugal	€75,000	(England) Adam Frayne (1)
10 Jun	Heydon Grange Classic	Hertfordshire	40,000	(England) Neil Walker (1)
23 Jun	Kronenbourg Classic	East Lothian	40,000	(Australia) Daniel Gaunt (2)
29 Jun	Bartercard Stoke by Nayland International Open	Suffolk	40,000	(England) Paul Curry (2)
20 Jul	Squibb Demolition International Open	Bristol	40,000	(England) John E. Morgan (1)
28 Jul	GMS Classic	Cheshire	40,000	(England) James Ruebotham (1)
4 Aug	Partypoker.com International Open	Northamptonshire	40,000	(England) Andrew Willey (2)
10 Aug	Bovey Castle Championship	Devon	40,000	(England) Chris Hanson (1)
18 Aug	Towergate Insurance Championship	Essex	40,000	(England) Phil Rowe (1)
25 Aug	Sweeney's Environmental Classic	Warwickshire	40,000	(England) Matthew Richardson (1)
1 Sep	Prime Time Recruitment Championship	West Yorkshire	40,000	(England) Kevin Harper (1)
8 Sep	Peugeot International Open	Northamptonshire	40,000	(England) Russell Claydon (1)
6 Oct	MCP Classic	Suffolk	40,000	(England) John E. Morgan (2)
23 Oct	Azores Tour Championship	Portugal	€100,000	(England) Stuart Cage (1)

== Order of Merit ==
The Order of Merit was based on prize money won during the season, calculated in Pound sterling. The top five players on the Order of Merit (not otherwise exempt) earned status to play on the 2007 Challenge Tour.

Position	Player	Prize money (£)	Status earned
1	(England) Kevin Harper	29,259	Promoted to Challenge Tour
2	(Northern Ireland) Damian Mooney	25,729	Promoted to Challenge Tour
3	(Australia) Daniel Gaunt	25,667	Promoted to Challenge Tour
4	(England) Stuart Cage	25,040	Promoted to Challenge Tour
5	(England) Matthew Richardson	21,533	Qualified for European Tour (Top 25 in Q School)
6	(England) John E. Morgan	20,233	Promoted to Challenge Tour
7	(England) Chris Hanson	19,993	
8	(England) Andrew Willey	18,921	
9	(England) Neil Walker	17,589	
10	(England) Mark Ramsdale	16,876	
