= David Whelan (golfer) =

English golfer and instructor

Personal information
- Nationality: England
- Born: 28 August 1961 (age 65) Sunderland, Tyne and Wear, England

Career
- Sport: Golf
- Turned professional: 1981
- Former tour: European Tour
- Professional wins: 1

Number of wins by tour
- European Tour: 1

Best results in major championships
- Masters Tournament: DNP
- PGA Championship: DNP
- U.S. Open: DNP
- The Open Championship: 58th: 1985

David Whelan (born 28 August 1961) is an English golf instructor and former professional golfer on the European Tour.

== Career ==
Whelan was born in Sunderland, Tyne and Wear, according to his profile on the European Tour website. He became a professional in 1981 and gained playing privileges on the European Tour in 1987, having been unsuccessful in five previous attempts. During his first year on tour, 1988, he needed a £500 loan from his parents to participate in the Barcelona Open, which he received. Whelan won the tournament by defeating three players in a playoff, including Nick Faldo. In his career, he played in The Open Championship five times, with three made cuts.

During his playing career, Whelan received coaching from David Leadbetter, who became a mentor for him when he went into golf instruction. In 1993, he was hired by the David Leadbetter Golf Academy as European director of instruction. Ten years later, he relocated to Bradenton, Florida in the United States to work at Leadbetter's academy there. When then-director Gary Gilchrist left the academy in 2004, Whelan, his assistant at the time, was promoted to director. Among the players Whelan has taught are LPGA major champions Paula Creamer and Catriona Matthew, PGA Tour player Hunter Mahan, 2010 U.S. Amateur winner Peter Uihlein, and LPGA Tour players Jessica and Nelly Korda.

== Professional wins (1) ==
=== European Tour wins (1) ===
| No. | Date | Tournament | Winning score | Margin of victory | Runners-up |
|---|---|---|---|---|---|
| 1 | 20 Mar 1988 | Torras Hostench Barcelona Open | −12 (68-65-74-69=276) | Playoff | (England) Nick Faldo, (England) Barry Lane, (Wales) Mark Mouland |

European Tour playoff record (1–0)

| No. | Year | Tournament | Opponents | Result |
|---|---|---|---|---|
| 1 | 1988 | Torras Hostench Barcelona Open | (England) Nick Faldo, (England) Barry Lane, (Wales) Mark Mouland | Won with par on fourth extra hole Faldo and Mouland eliminated by birdie on first hole |

== Team appearances ==
Amateur

- Jacques Léglise Trophy (representing Great Britain & Ireland): 1978
