= Stuart Cage =

English golfer (born 1973)

Personal information
- Nationality: England
- Born: 16 July 1973 (age 53) Leeds, England
- Height: 5 ft 11 in (1.80 m)
- Weight: 176 lb (80 kg; 12.6 st)

Career
- Sport: Golf
- Turned professional: 1993
- Former tours: European Tour; Challenge Tour; PGA EuroPro Tour
- Professional wins: 3

Number of wins by tour
- European Tour: 1
- Challenge Tour: 1
- Other: 1

Best results in major championships
- Masters Tournament: DNP
- PGA Championship: DNP
- U.S. Open: DNP
- The Open Championship: CUT: 1996

Stuart Cage (born 16 July 1973) is an English professional golfer.

== Amateur career ==
Cage won the English Amateur in 1992 and played for Great Britain & Ireland in the 1993 Walker Cup.

== Professional career ==
In 1993, Cage turned professional. He finished 8th on the second tier Challenge Tour rankings the following year, was a rookie on the European Tour in 1995. He nearly won the Irish Open during that first season, losing out to the experienced Sam Torrance to a playoff. Two years later he won his only European Tour title, at the Europe 1 Cannes Open. However, from 1998 onwards he struggled and he last played on the main European Tour in 2003.

== Amateur wins ==
- 1992 English Amateur, Lytham Trophy

== Professional wins (3) ==
=== European Tour wins (1) ===
No.	Date	Tournament	Winning score	Margin of victory	Runners-up
1	20 Apr 1997	Europe 1 Cannes Open	−14 (68-67-69-66=270)	5 strokes	(England) Paul Broadhurst, (England) David Carter

European Tour playoff record (0–1)

No.	Year	Tournament	Opponents	Result
1	1995	Murphy's Irish Open	(England) Howard Clark, (Scotland) Sam Torrance	Torrance won with eagle on second extra hole Cage eliminated by par on first hole

=== Challenge Tour wins (1) ===
No.	Date	Tournament	Winning score	Margin of victory	Runner-up
1	9 Jul 1994	Open Divonne	−16 (73-65-69-65=272)	2 strokes	(Wales) Stephen Dodd

=== PGA EuroPro Tour wins (1) ===
No.	Date	Tournament	Winning score	Margin of victory	Runners-up
1	23 Oct 2006	Azores Tour Championship	−4 (75-65-72=212)	Playoff	(England) Kevin Harper, (England) Mark Ramsdale

== Results in major championships ==
Tournament	1996
The Open Championship	CUT

CUT = missed the halfway cut
Note: Cage only played in The Open Championship.

== Team appearances ==
Amateur

- European Boys' Team Championship (representing England): 1991
- Jacques Léglise Trophy (representing Great Britain & Ireland): 1991 (winners)
- European Amateur Team Championship (representing England): 1993
- Walker Cup (representing Great Britain & Ireland): 1993
