= List of golfers with most European Tour wins =

This is a list of golfers who have won eight or more events on the European Tour since it was established in 1972. There are some complications in preparing such a list, and different publications have produced different numbers. This list is based on what the European Tour reports the victories being according to their own player guide (through the 2009 season).

The number of wins a player can accumulate on the European Tour depends in part on how many years he devotes to the tour. There have always been some leading European players or European Tour members from outside Europe who have gone on to play part or full-time on the U.S.-based PGA Tour and cut back their commitments in Europe, and this seems to be an increasing trend.

== Detailed criteria ==
- Only European Tour sanctioned events are counted. As all elite golfers enter the four major championships and the four (three before 2009) individual World Golf Championships each season it is possible for a player to accumulate eight wins in European Tour sanctioned events without ever joining the European Tour, and Tiger Woods (who has never joined the European Tour) reached that mark in the 2000 Open Championship.
- The three U.S.-based majors were not designated as European Tour events until 1997, so victories in them before that date were initially excluded. This is in contrast to the list of golfers with most PGA Tour wins, which includes Open Championship wins before that tournament became an official money event in 1995, because they were retrospectively designated as PGA Tour wins in 2002. Sometime prior to 2009, the European Tour made such a retrospective designation with respect to the three U.S. majors, as reflected in their 2009 media guide.
- Wins in the Wentworth World Match Play Championship before 2003 are not included.
- The win lists in the player profiles on the European Tour's official site include some miscellaneous items which are not regular individual tour wins and are therefore excluded: wins in 18 hole pro-ams associated with European Tour events; wins in the Volvo Bonus Pool; team wins in the Seve Trophy; wins on the Challenge Tour and the European Senior Tour.

There are additional players who won eight or more tournaments on the pre-tour European circuit and the European Tour in the period straddling 1972 who are not included on the list.

Many of the players on the list have won many events on other tours and unofficial events. The numbers in the "Majors" column are the total number of major championships the player won in his career whether or not he was a member of the European Tour at the time.

Players under 50 years of age are shown in bold. At age 50, golfers become eligible for the major senior tours, most notably the European Senior Tour and the U.S.-based PGA Tour Champions, competing for substantial prize money against other golfers in that age group. Only Miguel Ángel Jiménez and Phil Mickelson have ever won a European Tour event after turning 50, and only three golfers of that age have won on the PGA Tour since 1975.

== List ==
Players with the same number of wins are listed alphabetically. This list is up to date through 15 November 2026. (Note: Based on referenced table with incremental updates.)

Rank	Player	Lifespan	Wins	Majors	Winning span	Span (years)
1	(Spain) Seve Ballesteros H	1957–2011	50	5	1976–1995	20
2	(Germany) Bernhard Langer H	1957–	42	2	1980–2002	23
3	(United States) Tiger Woods H	1975–	41	15	1997–2019	23
4	(Scotland) Colin Montgomerie H	1963–	31	0	1989–2007	19
5	(England) Nick Faldo H	1957–	30	6	1977–1996	20
6	(Wales) Ian Woosnam H	1958–	29	1	1982–1997	16
7	(South Africa) Ernie Els H	1969–	28	4	1994–2013	20
8	(England) Lee Westwood	1973–	25	0	1996–2020	25
9	(Spain) José María Olazábal H	1966–	23	2	1986–2005	20
T10	(Spain) Miguel Ángel Jiménez	1964–	21	0	1992–2014	23
T10	(Northern Ireland) Rory McIlroy	1989–	21	6	2009–2026	18
T10	(Scotland) Sam Torrance	1953–	21	0	1976–1998	23
T13	(England) Mark James	1953–	18	0	1978–1997	20
T13	(Scotland) Sandy Lyle H	1958–	18	2	1979–1992	14
T15	(Spain) Sergio García	1980–	16	1	1999–2019	21
T15	(Zimbabwe) Mark McNulty	1953–	16	0	1979–2001	23
T17	(Denmark) Thomas Bjørn	1971–	15	0	1996–2013	18
T17	(England) Paul Casey	1977–	15	0	2001–2021	21
T17	(Republic of Ireland) Pádraig Harrington H	1971–	15	3	1996–2016	21
T20	(Northern Ireland) Darren Clarke	1968–	14	1	1993–2011	19
T20	(South Africa) Retief Goosen H	1969–	14	2	1996–2007	12
T20	(Australia) Greg Norman H	1955–	14	2	1977–1994	18
23	(Fiji) Vijay Singh H	1963–	13	3	1989–2008	20
T24	(Sweden) Alex Norén	1982–	12	0	2009–2025	17
T24	(England) Ian Poulter	1976–	12	0	2000–2012	13
T26	(England) Howard Clark	1954–	11	0	1978–1988	11
T26	(England) Matt Fitzpatrick	1994–	11	1	2015–2026	12
T26	(Sweden) Robert Karlsson	1969–	11	0	1995–2010	16
T26	(Germany) Martin Kaymer	1984–	11	2	2008–2014	7
T26	(Northern Ireland) Graeme McDowell	1979–	11	1	2002–2020	19
T26	(United States) Phil Mickelson H	1970–	11	6	2004–2021	18
T26	(South Africa) Louis Oosthuizen	1982–	11	1	2010–2023	14
T26	(Spain) Jon Rahm	1994–	11	2	2017–2026	10
T26	(England) Justin Rose	1980–	11	1	2002–2018	17
T26	(South Africa) Charl Schwartzel	1984–	11	1	2005–2016	12
T26	(Australia) Adam Scott	1980–	11	1	2003–2019	17
T26	(Sweden) Henrik Stenson	1976–	11	1	2001–2016	16
T38	(Scotland) Bernard Gallacher	1949–	10	0	1972–1984	13
T38	(Australia) Graham Marsh	1944–	10	0	1972–1985	14
T40	(Scotland) Brian Barnes	1945–2019	9	0	1972–1981	10
T40	(South Africa) Branden Grace	1988–	9	0	2012–2020	9
T40	(England) Tyrrell Hatton	1991–	9	0	2016–2026	11
T40	(United States) Dustin Johnson	1984–	9	2	2013–2021	9
T40	(Spain) Pablo Larrazábal	1983–	9	0	2008–2023	16
T40	(United States) Jack Nicklaus H	1940–	9	18	1972–1986	15
T40	(Spain) Manuel Piñero	1952–	9	0	1974–1985	12
T40	(Austria) Bernd Wiesberger	1985–	9	0	2012–2026	15
T48	(Scotland) Gordon Brand Jnr	1958–2019	8	0	1982–1993	12
T48	(New Zealand) Michael Campbell	1969–	8	1	2000–2005	6
T48	(England) Tommy Fleetwood	1991–	8	0	2013–2025	13
T48	(England) Tony Jacklin H	1944–	8	2	1972–1982	11
T48	(Thailand) Thongchai Jaidee	1969–	8	0	2004–2016	13
T48	(Scotland) Paul Lawrie	1969–	8	1	1996–2012	17
T48	(Denmark) Thorbjørn Olesen	1989–	8	0	2012–2024	13
T48	(Argentina) Eduardo Romero	1954–2022	8	0	1989–2002	14
T48	(Republic of Ireland) Des Smyth	1953–	8	0	1979–2001	23
T48	(England) Danny Willett	1987–	8	1	2012–2021	10

H signifies members of the World Golf Hall of Fame.

== See also ==
- List of golfers with most PGA Tour wins
- List of men's major championships winning golfers
