= Cannes Open =

Golf tournament in France (1979–1998)

Tournament information
- Location: Cannes, France
- Established: 1979
- Course: Golf de Cannes Mougins
- Par: 72
- Length: 6,833 yards (6,248 m)
- Tour: European Tour
- Format: Stroke play
- Prize fund: €550,000
- Month played: October
- Final year: 2001

Tournament record score
- Aggregate: 268 Jorge Berendt (2001)
- To par: −20 as above

Final champion
- (Argentina) Jorge Berendt
- Location in France Location in Provence-Alpes-Côte d'Azur

The Cannes Open was a men's professional golf tournament that was played annually from 1979 to 1998. From 1984 it was an event on the European Tour, and returned to the schedule as a one-off event in 2001 to replace the Estoril Open, which was cancelled by organisers due to security concerns following the 9/11 attacks in the United States.

The tournament had several different sponsored names. The winners included two major championship winners, Seve Ballesteros and Ian Woosnam. The prize fund peaked at £403,570 in 1996 before falling to £300,000 in 1998, which was the smallest on the European Tour that season. It was without a title sponsor that year, for the only time apart from 1988 and was subsequently cancelled.

Greg Norman won the 1983 event which was held in September, the same week as the St. Mellion Timeshare TPC on the European Tour. Frenchmen Jean Garaïalde (1980 and 1982) and Géry Watine (1981) were other winners prior to the tournament joining the European Tour schedule in 1984.

== Winners ==
Year	Winner	Score	To par	Margin of victory	Runner(s)-up	Venue	Ref.
Cannes Open
2001	(Argentina) Jorge Berendt	268	−20	1 stroke	(France) Jean van de Velde	Cannes Mougins	
1999–2000: No tournament
1998	(France) Thomas Levet	278	−6	1 stroke	(Wales) Phillip Price (Germany) Sven Strüver (New Zealand) Greg Turner	Royal Mougins	
Europe 1 Cannes Open
1997	(England) Stuart Cage	270	−14	5 strokes	(England) Paul Broadhurst (England) David Carter	Royal Mougins	
Air France Cannes Open
1996	(Scotland) Raymond Russell	272	−12	2 strokes	(England) David Carter	Royal Mougins	
1995	(Switzerland) André Bossert	132 (Note: Shortened to 36 holes due to rain.)	−10	2 strokes	(Norway) Øyvind Rojahn (France) Jean van de Velde	Royal Mougins	
1994	(Wales) Ian Woosnam	271	−17	5 strokes	(Scotland) Colin Montgomerie	Cannes Mougins	
1993	(Australia) Rodger Davis	271	−13	Playoff	(Zimbabwe) Mark McNulty	Cannes Mougins	
Credit Lyonnais Cannes Open
1992	(Sweden) Anders Forsbrand	273	−15	1 stroke	(Sweden) Per-Ulrik Johansson	Cannes Mougins	
1991	(Northern Ireland) David Feherty	275	−13	3 strokes	(Australia) Craig Parry	Cannes Mougins	
1990	(Zimbabwe) Mark McNulty (2)	280	−8	1 stroke	(Northern Ireland) Ronan Rafferty	Cannes Mougins	
1989	(England) Paul Broadhurst	207 (Note: Shortened to 54 holes due to rain.)	−9	1 stroke	(Northern Ireland) Jimmy Heggarty (Australia) Brett Ogle (Australia) Peter Senior	Cannes Mougins	
Cannes Open
1988	(Zimbabwe) Mark McNulty	279	−9	3 strokes	(United States) Ron Commans (United States) Joey Sindelar	Cannes Mougins	
Suze Open
1987	(Spain) Seve Ballesteros	275	−13	Playoff	(Wales) Ian Woosnam	Cannes Mougins	
1986	(South Africa) John Bland	276	−12	4 strokes	(Spain) Seve Ballesteros	Cannes Mougins	
Compagnie de Chauffe Cannes Open
1985	(England) Robert Lee	280	−8	Playoff	(Wales) David Llewellyn	Cannes Mougins	
1984	(South Africa) David Frost	280	−8	2 strokes	(Scotland) Gordon Brand Jnr (England) John Morgan	Cannes Mougins	
Cannes Open
1983	(Australia) Greg Norman	287	−1	2 strokes	(United States) Corey Pavin	Cannes Mougins	
1982	(France) Jean Garaïalde	284				Cannes Mougins	
1981	(France) Géry Watine	285	−3	1 stroke	(United States) Curtis Strange	Cannes Mougins	
1980	(France) Jean Garaïalde	287				Cannes Mougins	
Pro-Am de Cannes-Mougins
1979	(Italy) Silvano Locatelli	144				Cannes Mougins	
