= Harry Vardon Trophy =

European Tour golf award

The Harry Vardon Trophy is a golf award presented by the European Tour. Since 2009 it has been awarded to the winner of the Race to Dubai. Before then it was awarded to the winner of the "Order of Merit". From 1975 to 2008 the Order of Merit was based on prize money but before that date a points system was used. From 1937 until the European Tour became an independent organisation, the award was presented by the British PGA. The trophy is named for the Jersey golfing great Harry Vardon, who died in 1937.

The Race to Dubai is calculated in euro, although many of the events have prize funds which are fixed in other currencies, mainly pounds sterling or U.S. dollars. In these instances, the amounts are converted into euro at the exchange rate for the week that the tournament is played.

== History ==
The award was created in 1937 as the Harry Vardon Memorial Trophy. In its first year the award was presented to the player with the best average in the major stroke play events. Seven events were used: Daily Mail Tournament, Silver King Tournament, Dunlop-Southport Tournament, Southend Tournament, Open Championship, Irish Open and News Chronicle Tournament. Qualifying rounds did not count and a minimum of 18 rounds had to be played. The Dunlop-Metropolitan Tournament with its restricted field was not included and so the last qualifying event was the delayed Southend Tournament. Charles Whitcombe became the first winner with an average of 71.62 for 24 rounds. He had played in 6 of the 7 events (all except the Irish Open) scoring 289, 289, 283, 294, 282 and 282 for a total of 1719. The Irish golfer Paddy Mahon was second with an average of 71.90.

Six events were used in 1938 with a minimum of 16 rounds which had to include The Open Championship. The same events were used as in 1937 with the exception of the Southend Tournament. Henry Cotton won the award with an average of 72.87 having played in 4 of the 6 qualifying events. Reg Whitcombe was second with an average of 73.35 for 20 rounds.

A new system was introduced in 1939. A points system was used with the winner getting 1 point, 2nd place getting 2 points, down to 26 points for finishing outside the top 25. Five events were used with a minimum of 16 rounds which had to include the four rounds of the Open Championship. The Dunlop-Southport Tournament did not take place but otherwise the same tournaments were used as in 1938. Reg Whitcombe won with a score of 27 (7th, 6th, 3rd, 2nd and 9th). Sam King was second on 49 which included 26 points because he had not played in the Irish Open. King had a lower average (72.87) than Whitcombe (73).

In 1946, after World War II, the award was again given to the player with the best average in the major stroke play events. 20 rounds were required and four rounds of the Open were compulsory. Bobby Locke won with an average of 73.16 in 36 rounds. Norman Von Nida won in 1947 with an average of 71.25 in 52 rounds and Charlie Ward won in 1948 averaging 71.29 over 44 rounds.

Before 1980, the Order of Merit had been based on a points system or stroke average, so it was not necessarily headed by the golfer who won the most money. In 1971 Peter Oosterhuis won the Order of Merit and won £9,269. Gary Player was the leading money winner with £11,281 but of that, £8,500 came from winning the 1971 Piccadilly World Match Play Championship.

In 2009, the Order of Merit was replaced by the Race to Dubai, with a bonus pool of US$7.5 million (originally $10 million) distributed among the top 15 players at the end of the season, with the winner taking $1.5 million (originally $2 million). The new name reflected the addition of a new season ending tournament, the Dubai World Championship, held at the end of November in Dubai. The tournament also had a $7.5 million prize fund (originally $10 million), and was contested by the leading 60 players in the race following the season's penultimate event, the Hong Kong Open. The winner of the Race to Dubai also receives a ten-year European Tour exemption, while the winner of the Dubai World Championship receives a five-year exemption. The reduction in prize money, announced in September 2009, was due to the global economic downturn. In 2012, the bonus pool was reduced to $3.75 million with the winner getting $1 million and only the top 10 golfers getting a bonus. The bonus pool was increased to $5 million in 2014 with the top 15 players earning part of the pool. 2019 saw further changes: in 2018 the top 10 finishers on the Race to Dubai shared the bonus pool of $5 million, but as of 2019 the sum was split between only the leading five finishers. Whoever topped the standings received an additional $2 million compared with the $1.25 million won by Francesco Molinari in 2018. In addition, the DP World Tour Championship, Dubai was cut to the top 50 golfers on the Race to Dubai list, the prize fund was kept at $8 million but the winner's share was increased to $3 million. This was designed to increase interest and player participation in the event.

In November 2021, the Race to Dubai was renamed the DP World Tour Rankings in line with the tour being retitled as the DP World Tour. However, in November 2022, the tour announced that the Rankings would be reverted to the Race to Dubai, starting from the 2023 season.

== Winners ==
Year	Winner	Points
Year	Race to Dubai	Points
2026	(Northern Ireland) Rory McIlroy (8)	5,045
2025	(Northern Ireland) Rory McIlroy (7)	5,975
2024	(Northern Ireland) Rory McIlroy (6)	6,998
2023	(Northern Ireland) Rory McIlroy (5)	5,296
Year	DP World Tour Rankings	Points
2022	(Northern Ireland) Rory McIlroy (4)	4,754
Year	Race to Dubai	Points
2021	(United States) Collin Morikawa	5,856
2020	(England) Lee Westwood (3)	3,128
2019	(Spain) Jon Rahm	5,898
2018	(Italy) Francesco Molinari	6,041,521
2017	(England) Tommy Fleetwood	5,386,955
2016	(Sweden) Henrik Stenson (2)	5,289,506
2015	(Northern Ireland) Rory McIlroy (3)	4,727,253
2014	(Northern Ireland) Rory McIlroy (2)	7,149,503
2013	(Sweden) Henrik Stenson	4,103,796
Year	Race to Dubai	Prize money (€)
2012	(Northern Ireland) Rory McIlroy	5,519,118
2011	(England) Luke Donald	5,323,400
2010	(Germany) Martin Kaymer	4,461,011
2009	(England) Lee Westwood (2)	4,237,762
Year	Order of Merit	Prize money (€)
2008	(Sweden) Robert Karlsson	2,732,748
2007	(England) Justin Rose	2,944,945
2006	(Republic of Ireland) Pádraig Harrington	2,489,337
2005	(Scotland) Colin Montgomerie (8)	2,794,223
2004	(South Africa) Ernie Els (2)	4,061,905
2003	(South Africa) Ernie Els	2,975,374
2002	(South Africa) Retief Goosen (2)	2,360,128
Year	Volvo Order of Merit	Prize money (€)
2001	(South Africa) Retief Goosen	2,862,806
2000	(England) Lee Westwood	3,125,147
1999	(Scotland) Colin Montgomerie (7)	1,822,880
Year	Volvo Order of Merit	Prize money (£)
1998	(Scotland) Colin Montgomerie (6)	993,077
1997	(Scotland) Colin Montgomerie (5)	798,948
1996	(Scotland) Colin Montgomerie (4)	875,146
1995	(Scotland) Colin Montgomerie (3)	835,051
1994	(Scotland) Colin Montgomerie (2)	762,720
1993	(Scotland) Colin Montgomerie	613,683
1992	(England) Nick Faldo (2)	708,522
1991	(Spain) Seve Ballesteros (6)	545,354
1990	(Wales) Ian Woosnam (2)	574,166
1989	(Northern Ireland) Ronan Rafferty	400,311
1988	(Spain) Seve Ballesteros (5)	451,560
Year	Epson Order of Merit	Prize money (£)
1987	(Wales) Ian Woosnam	253,717
1986	(Spain) Seve Ballesteros (4)	242,209
1985	(Scotland) Sandy Lyle (3)	162,553
Year	Sperry Order of Merit	Prize money (£)
1984	(West Germany) Bernhard Langer (2)	139,344
Year	Official money list	Prize money (£)
1983	(England) Nick Faldo	119,416
1982	(Australia) Greg Norman	66,406
1981	(West Germany) Bernhard Langer	81,036
1980	(Scotland) Sandy Lyle (2)	43,346
Year	Order of Merit	Points
1979	(Scotland) Sandy Lyle	39,808
1978	(Spain) Seve Ballesteros (3)	47,178
1977	(Spain) Seve Ballesteros (2)	28,699
1976	(Spain) Seve Ballesteros	21,495
1975	(South Africa) Dale Hayes	17,488
1974	(England) Peter Oosterhuis (4)	2,965
1973	(England) Peter Oosterhuis (3)	3,440
1972	(England) Peter Oosterhuis (2)	1,751
1971	(England) Peter Oosterhuis	1,293
1970	(England) Neil Coles (2)	779
1969	(Scotland) Bernard Gallacher	910
1968	(Wales) Brian Huggett	919
1967	(England) Malcolm Gregson	
1966	(England) Peter Alliss (2)	893
1965	(England) Bernard Hunt (3)	969
1964	(England) Peter Alliss	1,940
1963	(England) Neil Coles	674
1962	(Republic of Ireland) Christy O'Connor Snr (2)	
1961	(Republic of Ireland) Christy O'Connor Snr	
1960	(England) Bernard Hunt (2)	
1959	(Wales) Dai Rees (2)	
1958	(England) Bernard Hunt	
1957	(Scotland) Eric Brown	
1956	(England) Harry Weetman (2)	
1955	(Wales) Dai Rees	
1954	(South Africa) Bobby Locke (3)	
1953	(Belgium) Flory Van Donck	
1952	(England) Harry Weetman	
1951	(Scotland) John Panton	
1950	(South Africa) Bobby Locke (2)	
1949	(England) Charlie Ward (2)	
1948	(England) Charlie Ward	
1947	(Australia) Norman Von Nida	
1946	(South Africa) Bobby Locke	
1940–1945: No award
1939	(England) Reg Whitcombe	
1938	(England) Henry Cotton	
1937	(England) Charles Whitcombe	

=== Multiple winners ===
Rank	Player	Wins	Years won
T1	(Northern Ireland) Rory McIlroy	8	2012, 2014, 2015, 2022, 2023, 2024, 2025, 2026
T1	(Scotland) Colin Montgomerie	8	1993, 1994, 1995, 1996, 1997, 1998, 1999, 2005
3	(Spain) Seve Ballesteros	6	1976, 1977, 1978, 1986, 1988, 1991
4	(England) Peter Oosterhuis	4	1971, 1972, 1973, 1974
T5	(England) Bernard Hunt	3	1958, 1960, 1965
T5	(South Africa) Bobby Locke	3	1946, 1950, 1954
T5	(Scotland) Sandy Lyle	3	1979, 1980, 1985
T5	(England) Lee Westwood	3	2000, 2009, 2020
T9	(England) Peter Alliss	2	1964, 1966
T9	(England) Neil Coles	2	1963, 1970
T9	(South Africa) Ernie Els	2	2003, 2004
T9	(England) Nick Faldo	2	1983, 1992
T9	(South Africa) Retief Goosen	2	2001, 2002
T9	(West Germany) Bernhard Langer	2	1981, 1984
T9	(Republic of Ireland) Christy O'Connor Snr	2	1961, 1962
T9	(Wales) Dai Rees	2	1955, 1959
T9	(Sweden) Henrik Stenson	2	2013, 2016
T9	(England) Charlie Ward	2	1948, 1949
T9	(England) Harry Weetman	2	1952, 1956
T9	(Wales) Ian Woosnam	2	1987, 1990
