= Turkish Seniors Open =

Gloria Classic
Tournament information
- Location: Belek, Antalya, Turkey
- Established: 1996
- Course: Gloria Golf Resort
- Par: 72
- Length: 6,800 yards (6,200 m)
- Tour: European Seniors Tour
- Format: Stroke play
- Prize fund: €325,000
- Month played: May
- Final year: 2007

Tournament record score
- Aggregate: 206 Nick Job (2007); 206 Martin Poxon (2007)
- To par: −10 as above

Final champion
- (England) Nick Job
- Location in Turkey

The Turkish Seniors Open was an over-50s men's professional golf tournament on the European Seniors Tour that was played from 1996 to 2001 and again in 2007. The 2007 event was played at Gloria Golf Resort, Belek in Antalya Province with a prize fund was €325,000.

== Winners ==
Year	Winner	Score	To par	Margin of victory	Runner(s)-up	Venue
Gloria Classic
2007	(England) Nick Job	206	−10	Playoff	(England) Martin Poxon	Gloria
2002–2006: No tournament
Beko Classic
2001	(Australia) Noel Ratcliffe	209	−7	1 stroke	(Australia) Terry Gale	Gloria
2000	(Wales) Brian Huggett	208	−8	Playoff	(Australia) Bob Shearer	Gloria
1999	(England) Tommy Horton (2)	211	−5	1 stroke	(United States) Alan Tapie	Klassis
1998	(United States) Bob Lendzion	211	−5	Playoff	(Spain) Antonio Garrido (South Africa) Bobby Verwey	Gloria
Beko Turkish Seniors Open
1997	(England) Tommy Horton	208	−8	2 strokes	(England) Maurice Bembridge	National GC
Beko/Oger Tours Turkish Open
1996	(South Africa) Bobby Verwey	218	+2	3 strokes	(England) Tommy Horton	National GC
