= Epson Grand Prix of Europe =

Tournament information
- Location: Chepstow, Wales
- Established: 1986
- Courses: St. Pierre Hotel & Country Club
- Par: 71
- Tour: European Tour
- Format: Stroke play Match play
- Prize fund: £450,000
- Month played: September
- Final year: 1991

Tournament record score
- Aggregate: 265 José María Olazábal (1991)
- To par: −19 as above
- Score: 4 and 3 Bernhard Langer (1988); 4 and 3 Seve Ballesteros (1989)

Final champion
- (Spain) José María Olazábal
- Location in Wales Location in Monmouthshire

The Epson Grand Prix of Europe was a European Tour golf tournament which was held annually from 1986 to 1991 at St. Pierre Golf & Country Club in Chepstow, South Wales. It was a match play event for the first four years before switching to stroke play for the final two years. Four of the six champions were major championship winners. In 1991 the prize fund was £450,000, which was on the high side of middling for a European Tour event at that time.

Four of the tournament's six winners were championship winners.

== Winners ==
Year	Winner	Score	To par	Margin of victory	Runner(s)-up
Epson Grand Prix of Europe
1991	(Spain) José María Olazábal	265	−19	9 strokes	(England) Mark James
1990	(Wales) Ian Woosnam	271	−13	3 strokes	(Zimbabwe) Mark McNulty (Spain) José María Olazábal
Epson Grand Prix of Europe Matchplay Championship
1989	(Spain) Seve Ballesteros	4 and 3			(England) Denis Durnian
1988	(West Germany) Bernhard Langer	4 and 3			(Zimbabwe) Mark McNulty
1987	(Sweden) Mats Lanner	1 up			(South Africa) Jeff Hawkes
1986	(Sweden) Ove Sellberg	3 and 2			(England) Howard Clark
