= 2008 European Seniors Tour =

Golf tour season

2008 European Seniors Tour season
- Duration: 7 March 2008 – 9 November 2008
- Number of official events: 18
- Most wins: (England) Peter Mitchell (3)
- Order of Merit: (Wales) Ian Woosnam
- Rookie of the Year: (Wales) Ian Woosnam

The 2008 European Seniors Tour was the 17th season of the European Seniors Tour, the main professional golf tour in Europe for men aged 50 and over.

== Schedule ==
The following table lists official events during the 2008 season.

Date	Tournament	Host country	Purse (€)	Winner (Note: The number in brackets after each winner's name is the number of European Seniors Tour events they had won up to and including that tournament. This information is only shown for European Seniors Tour members.)	Notes
9 Mar	DGM Barbados Open	Barbados	US$275,000	(Scotland) Bill Longmuir (7)	
30 Mar	Azores Senior Open	Portugal	325,000	(Australia) Stewart Ginn (1)	New tournament
25 May	Senior PGA Championship	United States	US$2,000,000	(United States) Jay Haas (n/a)	Senior major championship
1 Jun	Parkridge Polish Seniors Championship	Poland	280,000	(Wales) Ian Woosnam (1)	New tournament
8 Jun	Jersey Seniors Classic	Jersey	£140,000	(Zimbabwe) Tony Johnstone (1)	
15 Jun	Ryder Cup Wales Seniors Open	Wales	£500,000	(England) Peter Mitchell (1)	
22 Jun	Irish Seniors Open	Ireland	450,000	(Spain) Juan Quirós (3)	
6 Jul	Russian Seniors Open	Russia	US$750,000	(Wales) Ian Woosnam (2)	New tournament
27 Jul	The Senior Open Championship	Scotland	US$2,000,000	(United States) Bruce Vaughan (n/a)	Senior major championship
3 Aug	U.S. Senior Open	United States	US$2,600,000	(Argentina) Eduardo Romero (3)	Senior major championship (Note: Official win; unofficial money.)
10 Aug	Bad Ragaz PGA Seniors Open	Switzerland	260,000	(England) Carl Mason (20)	
24 Aug	De Vere Collection PGA Seniors Championship	England	£300,000	(England) Gordon J. Brand (4)	
31 Aug	Travis Perkins plc Senior Masters	England	£250,000	(England) Gordon J. Brand (5)	
7 Sep	Casa Serena Open	Czech Republic	600,000	(Germany) Bernhard Langer (1)	New tournament
14 Sep	Weston Homes PGA International Seniors	England	£175,000	(England) Nick Job (5)	New tournament
28 Sep	Scottish Seniors Open	Scotland	£225,000	(England) Peter Mitchell (2)	
12 Oct	Lake Garda Italian Seniors Open	Italy	200,000	(England) Peter Mitchell (3)	
9 Nov	OKI Castellón Open España Senior Tour Championship	Spain	400,000	(Scotland) Sam Torrance (10)	Tour Championship

== Order of Merit ==
The Order of Merit was based on prize money won during the season, calculated in Euros.

Position	Player	Prize money (€)
1	(Wales) Ian Woosnam	320,120
2	(England) Gordon J. Brand	257,744
3	(England) Peter Mitchell	217,488
4	(Spain) Juan Quirós	190,164
5	(Scotland) Bill Longmuir	177,033

== Awards ==
Award	Winner	Ref.
Rookie of the Year	(Wales) Ian Woosnam	
