= Moroccan Open =

Tournament information
- Location: Rabat, Morocco
- Established: 1987
- Course: Royal Golf Dar Es Salam
- Par: 73
- Length: 7,359 yards (6,729 m)
- Tour: European Tour
- Format: Stroke play
- Prize fund: €650,000
- Month played: April
- Final year: 2001

Tournament record score
- Aggregate: 266 Jamie Spence (2000)
- To par: −22 as above

Final champion
- (England) Ian Poulter
- Location in Morocco

The Moroccan Open was a professional golf tournament on the European Tour which was first held in 1987. Having been cancelled in 1988, it returned to the schedule in 1992 and was held annually until 2001. This was the second European Tour event in North Africa after the Tunisian Open, but the tour eventually left North Africa to focus its global expansion on the established golf markets of South Africa and Australasia and the major growth region of Asia.

There were several different host courses for the Moroccan Open. In 2001, the prize fund was €651,337, which was one of the smallest on the tour that year.

== Winners ==
| Year | Winner | Score | To par | Margin of victory | Runner(s)-up |
Moroccan Open
| 2001 | (England) Ian Poulter | 277 | −15 | 2 strokes | (England) David Lynn |
Moroccan Open Méditel
| 2000 | (England) Jamie Spence | 266 | −22 | 4 strokes | (France) Sébastien Delagrange (France) Thomas Levet (England) Ian Poulter |
Moroccan Open
| 1999 | (Spain) Miguel Ángel Martín | 276 | −12 | Playoff | (Wales) David Park |
| 1998 | (Australia) Stephen Leaney | 271 | −17 | 8 strokes | (Sweden) Robert Karlsson |
| 1997 | (South Africa) Clinton Whitelaw | 277 | −11 | 2 strokes | (England) Roger Chapman (Australia) Darren Cole (Australia) Wayne Riley |
| 1996 | (Sweden) Peter Hedblom | 281 | −7 | 1 stroke | (Argentina) Eduardo Romero |
| 1995 | (England) Mark James | 275 | −13 | 1 stroke | (England) David Gilford |
| 1994 | (Sweden) Anders Forsbrand | 276 | −12 | 4 strokes | (England) Howard Clark |
| 1993 | (England) David Gilford (2) | 279 | −9 | 1 stroke | (Trinidad and Tobago) Stephen Ames (England) Jamie Spence |
| 1992 | (England) David Gilford | 287 | −1 | Playoff | (Sweden) Robert Karlsson |
1989–1991: No tournament
| 1988 | Cancelled | | | | |
| 1987 | (England) Howard Clark | 284 | −8 | 3 strokes | (England) Mark James |

== See also ==
- Open golf tournament
