= 1982 European Tour =

Golf tour season

1982 European Tour season
- Duration: 15 April 1982 – 7 November 1982
- Number of official events: 27 (Note: One further tournament was scheduled but was cancelled.)
- Most wins: (Australia) Greg Norman (3)
- Official money list: (Australia) Greg Norman
- Sir Henry Cotton Rookie of the Year: (Scotland) Gordon Brand Jnr

The 1982 European Tour, titled as the 1982 PGA European Tour, was the 11th season of the European Tour, the main professional golf tour in Europe since its inaugural season in 1972.

== Changes for 1982 ==
It was the first year that the schedule included a tournament outside Europe, visiting North Africa for the Tunisian Open.

There were several changes from the previous season, with the addition of the Tunisian Open, the Car Care Plan International and the Sanyo Open, the return of the Portuguese Open; and the Trophée Lancôme became a counting event for the first time.

Shortly after the start of the season, the Greater Manchester Open was cancelled.

== Schedule ==
The following table lists official events during the 1982 season.

Date	Tournament	Host country	Purse (£)	Winner (Note: The number in brackets after each winner's name is the number of European Tour events they had won up to and including that tournament. This information is only shown for European Tour members and are inclusive of the three United States-based major championships which were included on the schedule for the first time in 1998, with earlier editions having retrospectively been recognised as official tour wins.)	Notes
11 Apr	Masters Tournament	United States	US$365,000	(United States) Craig Stadler (n/a)	Major championship (Note: Unofficial money event at the time, but retrospectively counted as an official win.)
18 Apr	Tunisian Open	Tunisia	60,000	(Spain) Antonio Garrido (4)	New tournament
25 Apr	Cepsa Madrid Open	Spain	45,000	(Spain) Seve Ballesteros (17)	
2 May	Italian Open	Italy	50,000	(England) Mark James (5)	
9 May	Paco Rabanne Open de France	France	45,000	(Spain) Seve Ballesteros (18)	
16 May	Martini International	England	65,000	(Scotland) Bernard Gallacher (8)	
23 May	Car Care Plan International	England	60,000	(England) Brian Waites (2)	New tournament
31 May	Sun Alliance PGA Championship	England	80,000	(England) Tony Jacklin (8)	
6 Jun	Jersey Open	Jersey	40,000	(Scotland) Bernard Gallacher (9)	
13 Jun	Dunlop Masters	England	85,000	(Australia) Greg Norman (7)	
20 Jun	Cold Shield Greater Manchester Open	England	–	Cancelled	
20 Jun	U.S. Open	United States	US$375,000	(United States) Tom Watson (6)	Major championship
27 Jun	Coral Classic	Wales	50,000	(Scotland) Gordon Brand Jnr (1)	
4 Jul	Scandinavian Enterprise Open	Sweden	65,000	(United States) Bob Byman (4)	
10 Jul	State Express English Classic	England	80,000	(Australia) Greg Norman (8)	
18 Jul	The Open Championship	England	250,000	(United States) Tom Watson (7)	Major championship
25 Jul	Lawrence Batley International	England	80,000	(Scotland) Sandy Lyle (7)	
1 Aug	Lufthansa German Open	West Germany	45,000	(West Germany) Bernhard Langer (4)	
8 Aug	KLM Dutch Open	Netherlands	40,000	(England) Paul Way (1)	
8 Aug	PGA Championship	United States	US$450,000	(United States) Raymond Floyd (n/a)	Major championship
15 Aug	Carroll's Irish Open	Ireland	80,000	(Republic of Ireland) John O'Leary (2)	
22 Aug	Benson & Hedges International Open	England	100,000	(Australia) Greg Norman (9)	
29 Aug	Ebel Swiss Open	Switzerland	60,000	(Wales) Ian Woosnam (1)	
5 Sep	European Open Championship	England	120,000	(Spain) Manuel Piñero (7)	
19 Sep	Haig Whisky TPC	Scotland	70,000	(England) Nick Faldo (5)	
26 Sep	Bob Hope British Classic	England	90,000	(Scotland) Gordon Brand Jnr (2)	Pro-Am
3 Oct	Benson & Hedges Spanish Open	Spain	50,000	(Scotland) Sam Torrance (4)	
10 Oct	Sanyo Open	Spain	60,000	(England) Neil Coles (7)	New to European Tour
24 Oct	Trophée Lancôme	France	65,000	(Australia) David Graham (n/a)	Upgraded to official event Limited-field event
7 Nov	Portuguese Open	Portugal	40,000	(Scotland) Sam Torrance (5)	

=== Unofficial events ===
The following events were sanctioned by the European Tour, but did not carry official money, nor were wins official.

Date	Tournament	Host country	Purse (£)	Winner(s)	Notes
12 Sep	Hennessy Cognac Cup	England	n/a	Team GB&I	Team event
12 Sep	Hennessy Cognac Cup Individual Trophy	England	n/a	(England) Mark James	
17 Oct	Suntory World Match Play Championship	England	100,000	(Spain) Seve Ballesteros	Limited-field event
30 Oct	Cacharel World Under-25 Championship	France	n/a	(Wales) Ian Woosnam	
5 Dec	World Cup	Mexico	n/a	(Spain) José María Cañizares and (Spain) Manuel Piñero	Team event
5 Dec	World Cup Individual Trophy	Mexico	n/a	(Spain) Manuel Piñero	

== Official money list ==
The official money list was based on prize money won during the season, calculated in Pound sterling.

Position	Player	Prize money (£)
1	(Australia) Greg Norman	66,406
2	(Scotland) Sandy Lyle	61,518
3	(Scotland) Sam Torrance	61,517
4	(England) Nick Faldo	56,884
5	(Spain) Manuel Piñero	54,211
6	(West Germany) Bernhard Langer	43,848
7	(Scotland) Gordon Brand Jnr	38,842
8	(Wales) Ian Woosnam	38,820
9	(Scotland) Bernard Gallacher	38,589
10	(Spain) Seve Ballesteros	38,437

== Awards ==
Award	Winner	Ref.
Sir Henry Cotton Rookie of the Year	(Scotland) Gordon Brand Jnr	
