= Weston Homes PGA International Seniors =

Tournament information
- Location: Stoke-by-Nayland, Suffolk, England
- Established: 2008
- Courses: Stoke By Nayland Hotel, Golf & Spa
- Par: 72
- Length: 6,757 yards (6,179 m)
- Tour: European Seniors Tour
- Format: Stroke play
- Prize fund: £175,000
- Month played: September
- Final year: 2008

Tournament record score
- Aggregate: 202 Nick Job (2008)
- To par: −14 as above

Final champion
- (England) Nick Job
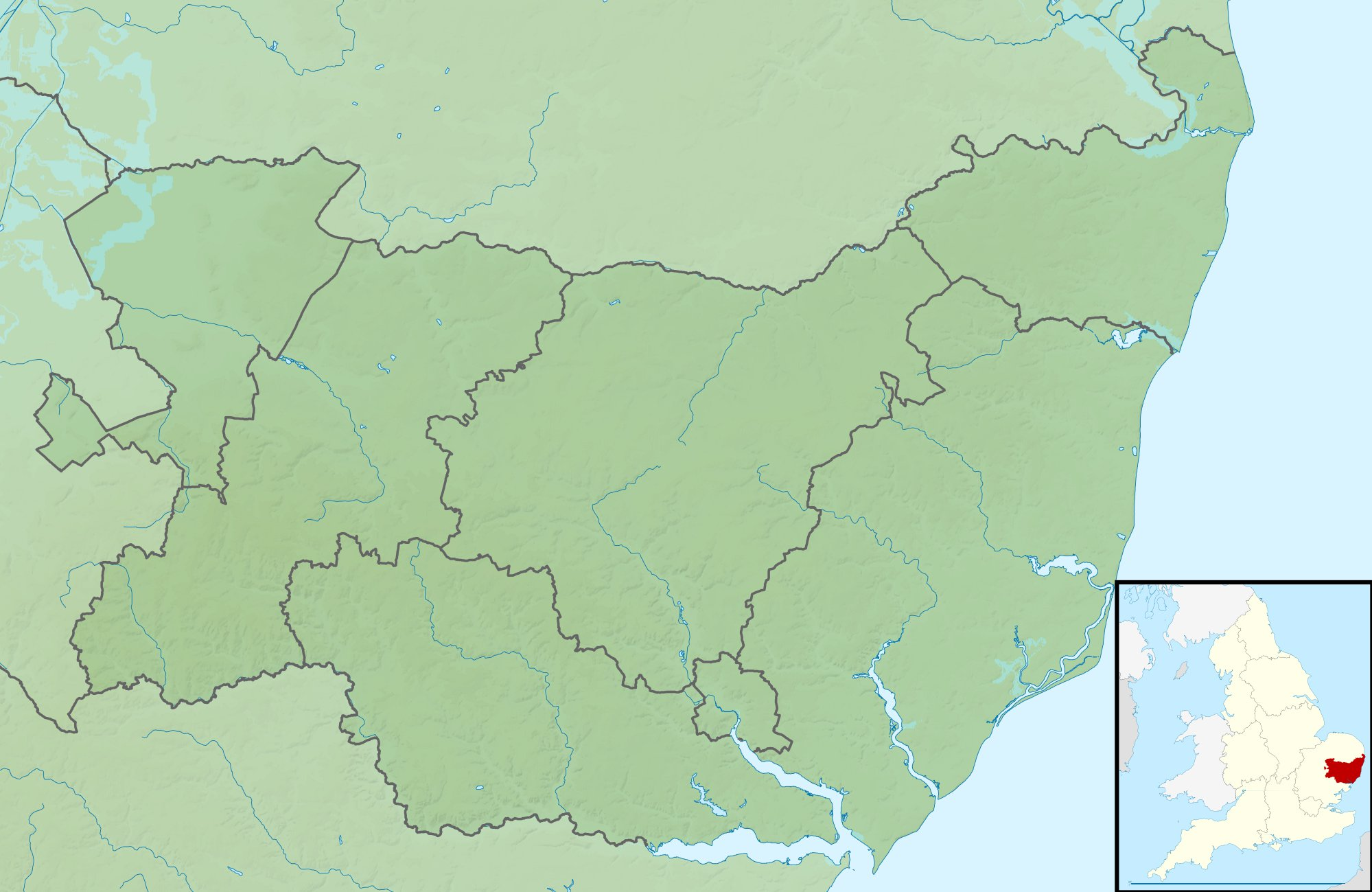
- Location in England Location in Suffolk

The Weston Homes PGA International Seniors was a men's professional golf tournament for players aged 50 and above as part of the European Seniors Tour. It was played just once, in September 2008, at the Stoke by Nayland Hotel, Golf & Spa, Stoke-by-Nayland, Suffolk, England. Nick Job won the event, two strokes ahead of Carl Mason. The total prize fund was £175,000 with the winner receiving £26,250.

== Winners ==
Year	Winner	Score	To par	Margin of victory	Runner-up
2008	(England) Nick Job	202	−14	2 strokes	(England) Carl Mason
