= 1997 European Tour =

Golf tour season

1997 European Tour season
- Duration: 23 January 1997 – 2 November 1997
- Number of official events: 38
- Most wins: (Germany) Bernhard Langer (4)
- Order of Merit: (Scotland) Colin Montgomerie
- Golfer of the Year: (Scotland) Colin Montgomerie
- Sir Henry Cotton Rookie of the Year: (Scotland) Scott Henderson

The 1997 European Tour, titled as the 1997 PGA European Tour, was the 26th season of the European Tour, the main professional golf tour in Europe since its inaugural season in 1972.

== Changes for 1997 ==
There were several changes from the previous season, with the addition of the South African Open, which replaced the FNB Players Championship, and the loss of the Catalan Open, the Austrian Open and the Scottish Open, which was effectively superseded by the Loch Lomond World Invitational.

== Schedule ==
The following table lists official events during the 1997 season.

Date	Tournament	Host country	Purse (£)	Winner (Note: The number in brackets after each winner's name is the number of European Tour events they had won up to and including that tournament. This information is only shown for European Tour members and are inclusive of the three United States-based major championships which were included on the schedule for the first time in 1998, with earlier editions having retrospectively been recognised as official tour wins.)	OWGR points	Other tours (Note: AFR − Southern Africa Tour; ANZ − PGA Tour of Australasia.)	Notes
26 Jan	Johnnie Walker Classic	Australia	700,000	(South Africa) Ernie Els (4)	44	ANZ	
2 Feb	Heineken Classic	Australia	A$1,100,000	(Spain) Miguel Ángel Martín (2)	40	ANZ	
9 Feb	South African Open	South Africa	500,000	(Fiji) Vijay Singh (7)	34	AFR	New to European Tour
16 Feb	Dimension Data Pro-Am	South Africa	400,000	(Zimbabwe) Nick Price (6)	26	AFR	Pro-Am
23 Feb	Alfred Dunhill South African PGA Championship	South Africa	300,000	(Zimbabwe) Nick Price (7)	24	AFR	
2 Mar	Dubai Desert Classic	UAE	US$1,200,000	(Australia) Richard Green (1)	40		
9 Mar	Moroccan Open	Morocco	350,000	(South Africa) Clinton Whitelaw (1)	20		
16 Mar	Portuguese Open	Portugal	350,000	(Sweden) Michael Jonzon (1)	20		
23 Mar	Turespaña Masters Open de Canarias	Spain	375,000	(Spain) José María Olazábal (17)	20		
30 Mar	Madeira Island Open	Portugal	300,000	(England) Peter Mitchell (2)	20		
13 Apr	Masters Tournament	United States	US$2,700,000	(United States) Tiger Woods (n/a)	100		Major championship (Note: Unofficial money event at the time, but retrospectively counted as an official win.)
20 Apr	Europe 1 Cannes Open	France	300,000	(England) Stuart Cage (1)	20		
27 Apr	Peugeot Open de España	Spain	500,000	(England) Mark James (18)	38		
4 May	Conte of Florence Italian Open	Italy	450,000	(Germany) Bernhard Langer (36)	28		
11 May	Benson & Hedges International Open	England	700,000	(Germany) Bernhard Langer (37)	36		
18 May	Alamo English Open	England	650,000	(Sweden) Per-Ulrik Johansson (4)	34		
26 May	Volvo PGA Championship	England	1,100,000	(Wales) Ian Woosnam (29)	64		Flagship event
1 Jun	Deutsche Bank Open TPC of Europe	Germany	750,000	(England) Ross McFarlane (1)	26		
8 Jun	Compaq European Grand Prix	England	650,000	(Scotland) Colin Montgomerie (13)	26		
15 Jun	U.S. Open	United States	US$2,600,000	(South Africa) Ernie Els (5)	100		Major championship
22 Jun	Volvo German Open	Germany	700,000	(Spain) Ignacio Garrido (1)	24		
29 Jun	Peugeot Open de France	France	600,000	(South Africa) Retief Goosen (2)	34		
6 Jul	Murphy's Irish Open	Ireland	675,000	(Scotland) Colin Montgomerie (14)	38		
12 Jul	Gulfstream Loch Lomond World Invitational	Scotland	800,000	(United States) Tom Lehman (n/a)	50		
20 Jul	The Open Championship	Scotland	1,600,000	(United States) Justin Leonard (n/a)	100		Major championship
27 Jul	Sun Microsystems Dutch Open	Netherlands	700,000	(Germany) Sven Strüver (2)	20		
3 Aug	Volvo Scandinavian Masters	Sweden	750,000	(Sweden) Joakim Haeggman (2)	34		
10 Aug	Chemapol Trophy Czech Open	Czech Republic	800,000	(Germany) Bernhard Langer (38)	24		
17 Aug	PGA Championship	United States	US$2,600,000	(United States) Davis Love III (n/a)	100		Major championship
24 Aug	Smurfit European Open	Ireland	850,000	(Sweden) Per-Ulrik Johansson (5)	32		
31 Aug	BMW International Open	Germany	750,000	(Sweden) Robert Karlsson (2)	36		
7 Sep	Canon European Masters	Switzerland	800,000	(Italy) Costantino Rocca (4)	32		
14 Sep	Trophée Lancôme	France	700,000	(United States) Mark O'Meara (n/a)	42		
21 Sep	One 2 One British Masters	England	750,000	(New Zealand) Greg Turner (4)	30		
5 Oct	Linde German Masters	Germany	750,000	(Germany) Bernhard Langer (39)	38		
26 Oct	Oki Pro-Am	Spain	450,000	(Republic of Ireland) Paul McGinley (2)	20		
2 Nov	Volvo Masters	Spain	1,000,000	(England) Lee Westwood (2)	28		Tour Championship

=== Unofficial events ===
The following events were sanctioned by the European Tour, but did not carry official money, nor were wins official.

Date	Tournament	Host country	Purse (£)	Winner(s)	OWGR points	Notes
28 Sep	Ryder Cup	Spain	n/a	Team Europe	n/a	Team event
12 Oct	Toyota World Match Play Championship	England	650,000	(Fiji) Vijay Singh	42	Limited-field event
12 Oct	Open Novotel Perrier	France	350,000	(Sweden) Anders Forsbrand and (Sweden) Michael Jonzon	n/a	Team event
19 Oct	Dunhill Cup	Scotland	1,000,000	Team South Africa	n/a	Team event
9 Nov	Subaru Sarazen World Open	United States	US$2,000,000	(United States) Mark Calcavecchia	40	
23 Nov	World Cup of Golf	United States	US$1,300,000	(Republic of Ireland) Pádraig Harrington and (Republic of Ireland) Paul McGinley	n/a	Team event
23 Nov	World Cup of Golf Individual Trophy	United States	US$200,000	(Scotland) Colin Montgomerie	n/a	
4 Jan	Andersen Consulting World Championship of Golf	United States	US$3,650,000	(Scotland) Colin Montgomerie	58	Limited-field event

== Order of Merit ==
The Order of Merit was titled as the Volvo Order of Merit and was based on prize money won during the season, calculated in Pound sterling.

Position	Player	Prize money (£)
1	(Scotland) Colin Montgomerie	798,947
2	(Germany) Bernhard Langer	692,398
3	(England) Lee Westwood	588,718
4	(Northern Ireland) Darren Clarke	537,409
5	(Wales) Ian Woosnam	503,562
6	(Spain) Ignacio Garrido	411,479
7	(South Africa) Retief Goosen	394,597
8	(Republic of Ireland) Pádraig Harrington	388,982
9	(Spain) José María Olazábal	385,648
10	(Sweden) Robert Karlsson	364,542

== Awards ==
Award	Winner	Ref.
Golfer of the Year	(Scotland) Colin Montgomerie	
Sir Henry Cotton Rookie of the Year	(Scotland) Scott Henderson	

== See also ==
- 1997 Challenge Tour
- 1997 European Seniors Tour
