= Monte Carlo Open (golf) =

Tournament information
- Location: Mont Agel, France
- Established: 1984
- Course: Monte Carlo Golf Club
- Par: 69
- Tour: European Tour
- Format: Stroke play
- Prize fund: £450,000
- Month played: July
- Final year: 1992

Tournament record score
- Aggregate: 258 Ian Woosnam (1990)
- To par: −18 as above

Final champion
- (Wales) Ian Woosnam

Location map
- Location in France Location in Provence-Alpes-Côte d'Azur

The Monte Carlo Open was a European Tour golf tournament which was played annually from 1984 to 1992. It was staged at the Monte Carlo Golf Club near Mont Agel in France, as there is no space for a golf course in Monaco. The winners of the tournament included two major champions, the Spaniard Seve Ballesteros, who won in 1986, and Welshman Ian Woosnam, who won the final three events. In 1992 the prize fund was £450,000, which was mid-range for a European Tour event at that time.

== Winners ==
Year	Winner	Score	To par	Margin of victory	Runner(s)-up
Monte Carlo Open
1993	Cancelled				
The European Newspaper Monte Carlo Open
1992	(Wales) Ian Woosnam (3)	261	−15	2 strokes	(Zimbabwe) Mark McNulty (Sweden) Johan Ryström
Torras Monte Carlo Open
1991	(Wales) Ian Woosnam (2)	261	−15	4 strokes	(Sweden) Anders Forsbrand
1990	(Wales) Ian Woosnam	258	−18	5 strokes	(Italy) Costantino Rocca
1989	(Zimbabwe) Mark McNulty	261	−15	6 strokes	(Spain) José María Cañizares (South Africa) Jeff Hawkes
Monte Carlo Open
1988	(Spain) José Rivero	261	−15	2 strokes	(Zimbabwe) Mark McNulty
Johnnie Walker Monte Carlo Open
1987	(Australia) Peter Senior	260	−16	1 stroke	(Australia) Rodger Davis
1986	(Spain) Seve Ballesteros	265	−11	2 strokes	(Zimbabwe) Mark McNulty
1985	(Scotland) Sam Torrance	264	−12	1 stroke	(Japan) Isao Aoki
Monte Carlo Open
1984	(England) Ian Mosey	131 (Note: Shortened to 36 holes due to fog.)	−7	4 strokes	(Spain) Manuel Calero (Australia) Peter Fowler
