= Barcelona Open (golf) =

Tournament information
- Location: Barcelona, Catalonia, Spain
- Established: 1981
- Course: Real Club de Golf El Prat
- Par: 72
- Tour: European Tour
- Format: Stroke play
- Prize fund: £200,000
- Month played: March
- Final year: 1988

Tournament record score
- Aggregate: 266 Neil Coles (1982)
- To par: −16 Seve Ballesteros (1985)

Final champion
- (England) David Whelan
- Location in Spain Location in Catalonia

The Barcelona Open was a professional golf tournament that was held in Barcelona, Catalonia, Spain. Founded as the Sanyo Open in 1981, it was an event on the European Tour from 1982 until 1988, after which it was replaced on the tour schedule by the Catalan Open. For the first two editions it was played at Club de Golf Sant Cugat, and thereafter at Real Club de Golf El Prat.

After sponsors Sanyo withdrew following the 1986 tournament, promoters IMG supported the event in 1987. However persistent bad weather rendered the El Prat course unplayable and the tournament was ultimately postponed until 1988.

The two most notable winners were Spanish major champions Seve Ballesteros in 1985 and José María Olazábal in 1986. The final tournament in 1988 was won by England's David Whelan, who defeated Nick Faldo, Barry Lane and Mark Mouland in a four-way playoff. Whelan, who had borrowed money from his parents in order to make the trip to Spain to compete in the tournament, triumphed at the 4th extra hole after the four players had tied at 276 (12 under par) after 72 holes.

== Winners ==
Year	Winner	Score	To par	Margin of victory	Runner(s)-up	Venue	Ref.
Barcelona Open
1989	Cancelled						
Torras Hostench Barcelona Open
1988	(England) David Whelan	276	−12	Playoff	(England) Nick Faldo (England) Barry Lane (Wales) Mark Mouland	El Prat	
Barcelona Open
1987	Cancelled due to course flooding					El Prat	
Sanyo Open
1986	(Spain) José María Olazábal	273	−15	3 strokes	(England) Howard Clark	El Prat	
1985	(Spain) Seve Ballesteros	272	−16	3 strokes	(South Africa) Jeff Hawkes	El Prat	
1984	(Scotland) Sam Torrance	281	−7	Playoff	(Republic of Ireland) Des Smyth	El Prat	
1983	(Republic of Ireland) Des Smyth	279	−9	1 stroke	(South Africa) Hugh Baiocchi (England) Mark James	El Prat	
1982	(England) Neil Coles	266	−14	1 stroke	(England) Gary Cullen	Sant Cugat	
1981	(Scotland) Bernard Gallacher	268	−12	3 strokes	(Spain) Seve Ballesteros	Sant Cugat	
