= Nick Job =

English golfer (born 1949)

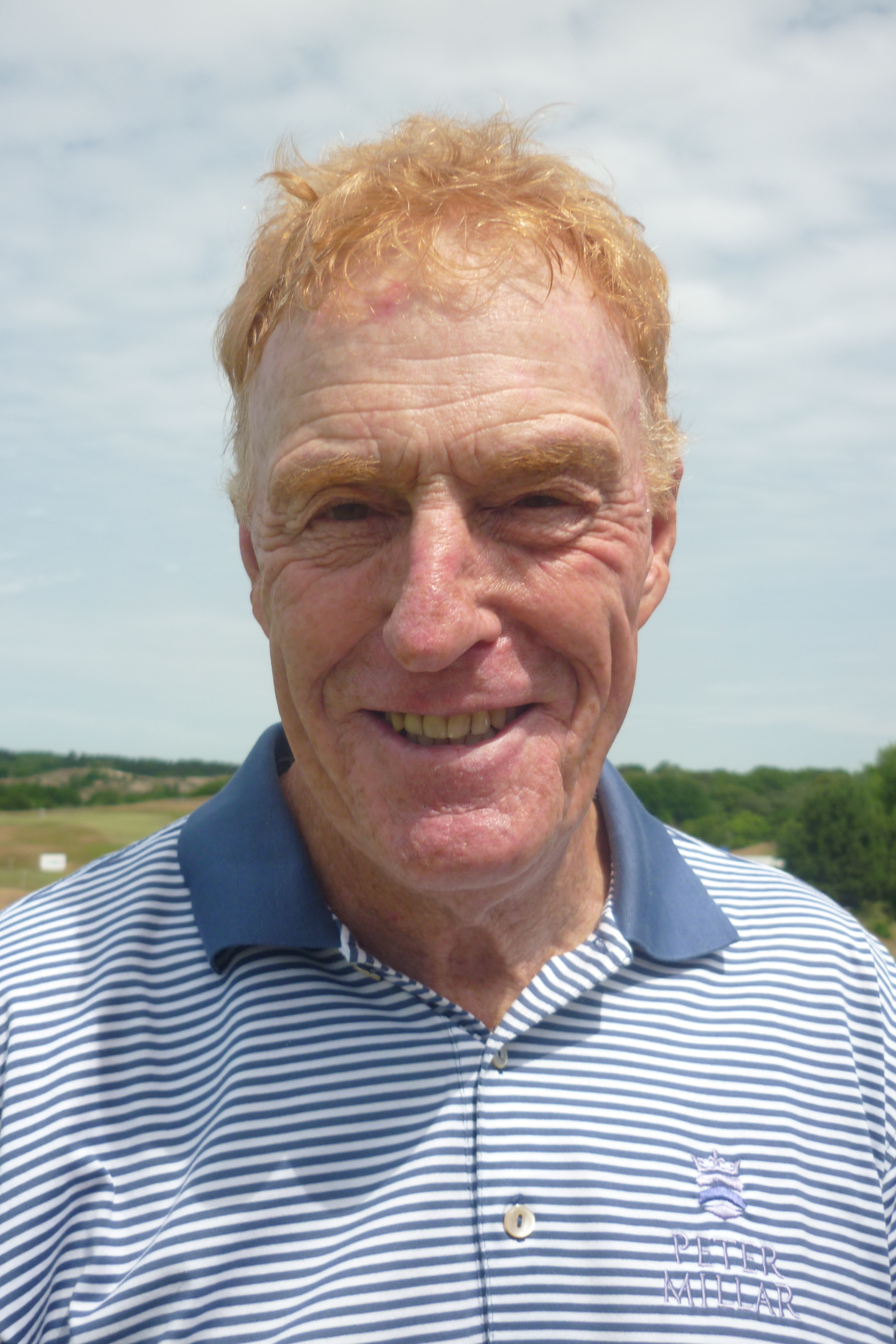

Personal information
- Full name: Nicholas James Job
- Nationality: England
- Born: 27 July 1949 (age 77) Haslemere, Surrey
- Height: 6 ft 0 in (1.83 m)

Career
- Sport: Golf
- Turned professional: 1965
- Current tour: European Senior Tour
- Former tour: European Tour
- Professional wins: 9

Number of wins by tour
- European Senior Tour: 5
- Other: 4

Best results in major championships
- Masters Tournament: DNP
- PGA Championship: DNP
- U.S. Open: DNP
- The Open Championship: T14: 1981

Nicholas James Job (born 27 July 1949) is an English professional golfer who plays on the European Senior Tour. He has won five times on the tour.

== Career ==
In 1965, Job turned professional. He qualified for the 1966 Open Championship as a 16-year-old. He played on the British circuit, winning two age-restricted tournaments, the Gor-Ray Under-24 Championship in 1969 and the under-23 BUA Rising Star Tournament in 1970.

The European Tour was founded in the 1970s and Job finished in the top-100 on the European Tour Order of Merit twelve times, with a best ranking of 26th in 1981. His best tournament result on the European Tour came at the 1978 Greater Manchester Open, where he lost to Brian Barnes in a playoff.

Job played in Southern Africa in the winter and had a decent amount of success. He finished in third place at the 1973 Corlett Drive Classic behind Dale Hayes of South Africa. Three years later, he won the Victoria Falls Classic in Salisbury, Rhodesia, defeating Andries Oosthuizen in a playoff.

After turning 50, Job had considerable success playing on the European Seniors Tour, winning five times between 2000 and 2008. At the age of 64, he finished third in the 2013 Berenberg Masters and he continued playing on the tour into his 70s. In 2019, he set a new record for the number of appearances in European Seniors Tour events.

== Professional wins (9) ==
=== Regular wins (4) ===
- 1969 Gor-Ray Under-24 Championship
- 1970 BUA Rising Star Tournament
- 1973 Kent Open
- 1976 Victoria Falls Classic

=== European Seniors Tour wins (5) ===
No.	Date	Tournament	Winning score	Margin of victory	Runner-up
1	9 Jul 2000	TotalFina Elf Seniors Open	−7 (69-73-67=209)	2 strokes	(Japan) Seiji Ebihara
2	30 Jun 2001	Lawrence Batley Seniors	−9 (69-72-63=204)	5 strokes	(England) Denis Durnian
3	28 Aug 2005	Charles Church Scottish Seniors Open	−10 (69-66-71=206)	1 stroke	(France) Jean Pierre Sallat
4	13 May 2007	Gloria Classic	−10 (71-67-68=206)	Playoff	(England) Martin Poxon
5	14 Sep 2008	Weston Homes PGA International Seniors	−14 (68-65-69=202)	2 strokes	(England) Carl Mason

European Seniors Tour playoff record (1–0)

No.	Year	Tournament	Opponent	Result
1	2007	Gloria Classic	(England) Martin Poxon	Won after concession on first extra hole

== Playoff record ==
European Tour playoff record (0–1)

No.	Year	Tournament	Opponents	Result
1	1978	Greater Manchester Open	(Scotland) Brian Barnes, (New Zealand) Bob Charles, (England) Denis Durnian	Barnes won with birdie on first extra hole

== Results in major championships ==
Tournament	1966	1967	1968	1969
The Open Championship	CUT			CUT

Tournament	1970	1971	1972	1973	1974	1975	1976	1977	1978	1979
The Open Championship		WD	CUT					CUT	T22	CUT

Tournament	1980	1981	1982	1983
The Open Championship		T14	CUT	CUT

Note: Job only played in The Open Championship.

Did not play

WD = Withdrew
CUT = missed the half-way cut (3rd round cut in 1969 Open Championship)
"T" = tied

== Team appearances ==
- Hennessy Cognac Cup (representing Great Britain and Ireland): 1980 (winners)
- PGA Cup (representing Great Britain & Ireland/Europe): 1988, 1992, 1994, 1996 (tie)

== See also ==
- List of golfers with most European Senior Tour wins
