= German Masters (golf) =

Men's professional golf tournament

Mercedes-Benz Championship
Tournament information
- Location: Pulheim, Germany
- Established: 1987
- Course: Golf Club Gut Lärchenhof
- Par: 72
- Length: 7,289 yards (6,665 m)
- Tour: European Tour
- Format: Stroke play
- Prize fund: €2,000,000
- Month played: September
- Final year: 2009

Tournament record score
- Aggregate: 262 K. J. Choi (2003)
- To par: −26 as above

Final champion
- (South Africa) James Kingston
- Location in Germany Location in North Rhine-Westphalia

The German Masters was a European Tour men's professional golf tournament played in Germany, and hosted and promoted by Germany's most successful golfer Bernhard Langer and his brother Erwin.

== History ==
Founded in 1987, the tournament was originally played in Stuttgart, moving to Berlin in 1994. Since 1998, it has been held at Golf Club Gut Lärchenhof in Pulheim near Cologne. The prize fund had climbed to €3 million by 2005, making the German Masters one of the richer tournaments on the PGA European Tour at that time outside of the major championships and the three individual World Golf Championships.

After a one-year break in 2006, the tournament returned to the European Tour schedule in 2007, renamed as the Mercedes-Benz Championship. Played as a no-cut event, it had a maximum field of 78, consisting primarily of players who had either won tournaments on the European Tour in 2007 or were in the top 75 of the Official World Golf Rankings or in the top 60 of the European Order of Merit. It was played in mid-September, a slot created by the rescheduling of the HSBC World Match Play Championship to October. However, as it clashed with the PGA Tour's Tour Championship, many leading players were unavailable, and so the prize fund had dropped to €2 million on its return, one third less than it was in 2005.

== Winners ==
Year	Winner	Score	To par	Margin of victory	Runner(s)-up
Mercedes-Benz Championship
2009	(South Africa) James Kingston	275	−13	Playoff	(Denmark) Anders Hansen
2008	(Sweden) Robert Karlsson	275	−13	2 strokes	(Italy) Francesco Molinari
2007	(Denmark) Søren Hansen	271	−17	4 strokes	(England) Phillip Archer (Scotland) Alastair Forsyth
Linde German Masters
2006: No tournament
2005	(South Africa) Retief Goosen	268	−20	1 stroke	(England) Nick Dougherty (England) David Lynn (Spain) José María Olazábal (Sweden) Henrik Stenson
2004	(Republic of Ireland) Pádraig Harrington	275	−13	3 strokes	(Australia) Nick O'Hern
2003	(South Korea) K. J. Choi	262	−26	2 strokes	(Spain) Miguel Ángel Jiménez
2002	(Australia) Stephen Leaney	266	−22	1 stroke	(Germany) Alex Čejka
2001	(Germany) Bernhard Langer (4)	266	−22	1 stroke	(United States) John Daly (Sweden) Freddie Jacobson
2000	(New Zealand) Michael Campbell	197 (Note: Shortened to 54 holes due to weather.)	−19	1 stroke	(Argentina) José Cóceres
1999	(Spain) Sergio García	277	−11	Playoff	(Republic of Ireland) Pádraig Harrington (Wales) Ian Woosnam
1998	(Scotland) Colin Montgomerie	266	−22	1 stroke	(Sweden) Robert Karlsson (Fiji) Vijay Singh
1997	(Germany) Bernhard Langer (3)	267	−21	6 strokes	(Scotland) Colin Montgomerie
1996	(Northern Ireland) Darren Clarke	264	−24	1 stroke	(England) Mark Davis
Mercedes German Masters
1995	(Sweden) Anders Forsbrand	264	−24	2 strokes	(Germany) Bernhard Langer
1994	(Spain) Seve Ballesteros	270	−18	Playoff	(South Africa) Ernie Els (Spain) José María Olazábal
1993	(England) Steven Richardson	271	−17	2 strokes	(Sweden) Robert Karlsson
1992	(England) Barry Lane	272	−16	2 strokes	(Australia) Rodger Davis (Germany) Bernhard Langer (Wales) Ian Woosnam
1991	(Germany) Bernhard Langer (2)	275	−13	Playoff	(Australia) Rodger Davis
1990	(Scotland) Sam Torrance	272	−16	3 strokes	(Germany) Bernhard Langer (Wales) Ian Woosnam
German Masters
1989	(West Germany) Bernhard Langer	276	−12	1 stroke	(Spain) José María Olazábal (United States) Payne Stewart
1988	(Spain) José María Olazábal	279	−9	2 strokes	(Sweden) Anders Forsbrand (Republic of Ireland) Des Smyth
1987	(Scotland) Sandy Lyle	278	−10	Playoff	(West Germany) Bernhard Langer
