= Ian Woosnam =

Welsh professional golfer (born 1958)

Ian Woosnam OBE
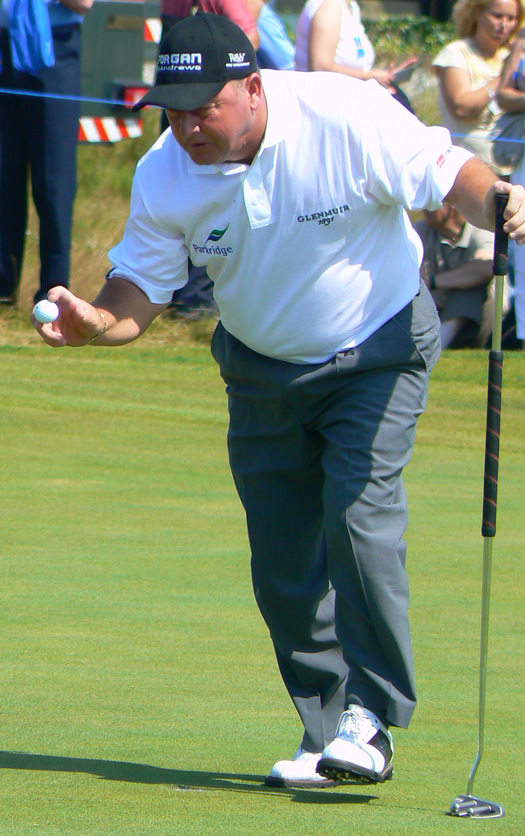
- Woosnam in 2009

Personal information
- Full name: Ian Harold Woosnam
- Nickname: Woosie
- Nationality: Wales
- Born: 2 March 1958 (age 68) Oswestry, England
- Height: 1.63 m (5 ft 4 in)
- Weight: 168 lb (76 kg; 12.0 st)
- Spouse: Glendryth (m. 1983)
- Children: 3

Career
- Sport: Golf
- Turned professional: 1976
- Current tour: European Senior Tour
- Former tours: European Tour; PGA Tour Champions
- Professional wins: 52
- Highest ranking: 1 (7 April 1991) (50 weeks)

Number of wins by tour
- PGA Tour: 2
- European Tour: 29 (6th-all-time)
- PGA Tour of Australasia: 2
- PGA Tour Champions: 1
- European Senior Tour: 5
- Other: 16

Best results in major championships (wins: 1)
- Masters Tournament: Won: 1991
- PGA Championship: 6th: 1989
- U.S. Open: T2: 1989
- The Open Championship: T3: 1986, 2001

Achievements and awards
- World Golf Hall of Fame: 2017 (member page)
- European Tour Order of Merit winner: 1987, 1990
- European Tour Golfer of the Year: 1987
- European Seniors Tour Order of Merit winner: 2008
- European Seniors Tour Rookie of the Year: 2008

Ian Harold Woosnam (born 2 March 1958) is a Welsh professional golfer. In 1976, as a teenager, Woosnam turned pro. He picked up his first European Tour win at the 1982 Swiss Open; this began a decade of success. Woosnam led the European Tour's Order of Merit in 1987 and 1990, ultimately winning 29 tournaments on tour, among the most ever. Woosnam's career reached its peak in 1991, as he won the Masters and spent most of the year ranked number one in the world. After the age of 50, Woosnam has continued his success, winning events on the Champions Tour, European Senior Tour, and Japan Senior Tour. In 2017, at the age 59, Woosnam was inducted into the World Golf Hall of Fame.

== Early life ==
Woosnam was born in Oswestry, Shropshire, England, to Welsh parents. His family lived in the nearby village of St Martin's.

== Amateur career ==
Woosnam started playing at the Llanymynech Golf Club, which straddles the Wales-England border. He is short for a male golfer at 1.64 m (5 ft 4 1/2 in), but he is a powerful hitter. He played as an amateur in regional competitions in the English county of Shropshire alongside Sandy Lyle.

== Professional career ==
In 1976, Woosnam turned professional. Three years later, in 1979, he first played the European Tour. Woosnam spent his early years on tour driving around the continent in a camper van, living on a diet of baked beans to save money. After three modest seasons, his career took off in 1982 when he won the Swiss Open and came eighth on the Order of Merit. It was the first of ten consecutive years where Woosnam finished in the top ten of the Order of Merit. In addition, he led the Order of Merit in 1987 and 1990; in the former year he set a world record for global tournament earnings of £1,062,662. He has won 29 official money events on the European Tour and many other events around the world.

Woosnam placed third in the 1986 Open Championship. In 1987, Woosnam was criticised by anti-apartheid campaigners for playing a tournament in Sun City in apartheid South Africa, in contravention of the United Nations cultural moratorium.

In 1991, he reached the top of the Official World Golf Ranking, eventually spending a total of 50 weeks as World Number 1 (7 April 1991 – 21 March 1992). In the same year, he emulated his British rivals, Sandy Lyle and Nick Faldo, by winning the Masters Tournament; the first person representing Wales to ever win a major championship.

After winning the Torras Monte Carlo Golf Open in 1991, Woosnam had a decline in form in the second half of the year and said that he was suffering from exhaustion after playing in too many tournaments across the world. In December 1991, his sterling silver Masters trophy, a $9,000 copy of the original, was stolen from a British train.

Woosnam's last official European Tour victory was in the 1997 Volvo PGA Championship. In the late 1990s, his form began to fade, but he nearly made a spectacular comeback at The Open Championship in 2001, when he finished third despite suffering a two-stroke penalty for starting the final round with 15 clubs in his bag instead of the allowable maximum of 14. While his caddie, Miles Byrne, was responsible for this error, Woosnam decided not to dismiss him, but did fire him two weeks later when, after a night drinking, Byrne failed to turn up to tee-time.

Later in 2001, at the age of 43, Woosnam became the oldest player to win the World Match Play Championship (not an official European Tour event at the time) when he beat Pádraig Harrington 2 & 1 in the final. Woosnam also became the first player to win the event in three different decades, having previously won in 1987 and 1990. Woosnam had a record outward nine holes of 28 (-7) in the 2001 final against Harrington, which tied the tournament record of seven successive birdies in a match.

Woosnam was a member of eight consecutive European Ryder Cup teams from 1983 to 1997. Despite not winning a singles match he accumulated an overall record of 14 wins, 12 losses and 5 halves in 31 matches. He was a vice captain for the 2002 European team and was elected as captain for the 2006 Ryder Cup, leading Europe to victory over the U.S. 18½–9½ at the K Club, County Kildare, Ireland.

On 1 June 2008, Woosnam won his first stroke play title in 11 years at the Parkridge Polish Seniors Championship at Kraków Valley Golf and Country Club, finishing with a course record 63. The tournament was his third appearance on European Seniors Tour, which he joined after turning 50 years old in March 2008. Woosnam went on to win the European Seniors Tour Order of Merit that year becoming the only person to have won the Order of Merit on both the European Seniors Tour and the regular European Tour.

== Awards and honours ==
- In 1987, Woosnam won BBC Wales Sports Personality of the Year awards. He won the award again in 1990 and 1991.
- Woosnam was awarded an OBE at the 2007 New Years Honours List.
- In September 2010, he was inducted to the Welsh Sports Hall of Fame.
- In 2017, Woosnam was inducted into the World Golf Hall of Fame.

== Personal life ==
In 1983, Woosnam married Glendryth. They have three children.

In 1987, Woosnam was diagnosed with ankylosing spondylitis (AS). In 1993, Woosnam was charged with a DUI in Shropshire, England. According to the police, he was charged "after crashing his luxury car."

== Professional wins (52) ==
=== PGA Tour wins (2) ===
Legend
Major championships (1)
Other PGA Tour (1)

No.	Date	Tournament	Winning score	Margin of victory	Runner-up
1	24 Mar 1991	USF&G Classic	−13 (73-67-68-67=275)	Playoff	(United States) Jim Hallet
2	14 Apr 1991	Masters Tournament	−11 (72-66-67-72=277)	1 stroke	(Spain) José María Olazábal

PGA Tour playoff record (1–0)

No.	Year	Tournament	Opponent	Result
1	1991	USF&G Classic	(United States) Jim Hallet	Won with par on second extra hole

=== European Tour wins (29) ===
Legend
Major championships (1)
Flagship events (1)
Other European Tour (27)

No.	Date	Tournament	Winning score	Margin of victory	Runner(s)-up
1	29 Aug 1982	Ebel Swiss Open	−16 (68-68-66-70=272)	Playoff	(Scotland) Bill Longmuir
2	5 Jun 1983	Silk Cut Masters	−15 (68-69-67-65=269)	3 strokes	(Scotland) Bernard Gallacher
3	8 Jul 1984	Scandinavian Enterprise Open	−4 (71-70-69-70=280)	3 strokes	(United States) Peter Teravainen
4	21 Sep 1986	Lawrence Batley International T.P.C.	−11 (71-71-66-69=277)	7 strokes	(Scotland) Ken Brown, (Spain) José María Cañizares
5	12 Apr 1987	Jersey Open	−9 (68-67-72-72=279)	1 stroke	(United States) Bill Malley
6	26 Apr 1987	Cepsa Madrid Open	−19 (67-67-69-66=269)	3 strokes	(Australia) Wayne Grady
7	11 Jul 1987	Bell's Scottish Open	−20 (65-65-66-68=264)	7 strokes	(Australia) Peter Senior
8	20 Sep 1987	Trophée Lancôme	−24 (65-64-69-66=264)	2 strokes	(Zimbabwe) Mark McNulty
9	30 May 1988	Volvo PGA Championship	−14 (67-70-70-67=274)	2 strokes	(Spain) Seve Ballesteros, (England) Mark James
10	21 Aug 1988	Carroll's Irish Open	−10 (68-70-70-70=278)	7 strokes	(Spain) Seve Ballesteros, (England) Nick Faldo, (Spain) Manuel Piñero, (Republic of Ireland) Des Smyth
11	11 Sep 1988	Panasonic European Open	−20 (65-66-64-65=260)	3 strokes	(England) Nick Faldo
12	25 Jun 1989	Carroll's Irish Open (2)	−10 (70-67-71-70=278)	Playoff	(Republic of Ireland) Philip Walton
13	4 Mar 1990	Amex Med Open	−6 (68-68-74=210) (Note: Shortened to 54 holes due to weather.)	2 strokes	(Spain) Miguel Ángel Martín, (Argentina) Eduardo Romero
14	7 Jul 1990	Torras Monte Carlo Open	−18 (66-67-65-60=258)	5 strokes	(Italy) Costantino Rocca
15	14 Jul 1990	Bell's Scottish Open (2)	−15 (72-62-67-68=269)	4 strokes	(Zimbabwe) Mark McNulty
16	30 Sep 1990	Epson Grand Prix of Europe	−13 (65-67-67-72=271)	3 strokes	(Zimbabwe) Mark McNulty, (Spain) José María Olazábal
17	3 Mar 1991	Fujitsu Mediterranean Open (2)	−5 (70-71-71-67=279)	1 stroke	(England) Michael McLean
18	14 Apr 1991	Masters Tournament	−11 (72-66-67-72=277)	1 stroke	(Spain) José María Olazábal
19	6 Jul 1991	Torras Monte Carlo Open (2)	−15 (67-66-61-67=261)	4 strokes	(Sweden) Anders Forsbrand
20	4 Jul 1992	The European Newspaper Monte Carlo Open (3)	−15 (66-65-66-64=261)	2 strokes	(Zimbabwe) Mark McNulty, (Sweden) Johan Ryström
21	22 Aug 1993	Murphy's English Open	−19 (71-67-65-66=269)	2 strokes	(Italy) Costantino Rocca
22	19 Sep 1993	Trophée Lancôme (2)	−13 (64-70-68-65=267)	2 strokes	(Scotland) Sam Torrance
23	1 May 1994	Air France Cannes Open	−17 (72-70-63-66=271)	5 strokes	(Scotland) Colin Montgomerie
24	18 Sep 1994	Dunhill British Masters (2)	−17 (71-70-63-67=271)	4 strokes	(Spain) Seve Ballesteros
25	28 Jan 1996	Johnnie Walker Classic^{1}	−16 (69-68-69-66=272)	Playoff	(Scotland) Andrew Coltart
26	4 Feb 1996	Heineken Classic^{1}	−11 (69-71-65-72=277)	1 stroke	(Republic of Ireland) Paul McGinley, (France) Jean van de Velde
27	13 Jul 1996	Scottish Open (3)	+1 (70-74-70-75=289)	4 strokes	(Scotland) Andrew Coltart
28	25 Aug 1996	Volvo German Open	−20 (64-64-65=193)	6 strokes	(Germany) Thomas Gögele, (Sweden) Robert Karlsson, (England) Iain Pyman, (Spain) Fernando Roca
29	26 May 1997	Volvo PGA Championship (2)	−13 (67-68-70-70=275)	2 strokes	(Northern Ireland) Darren Clarke, (South Africa) Ernie Els, (England) Nick Faldo

^{1}Co-sanctioned by the PGA Tour of Australasia

European Tour playoff record (3–5)

No.	Year	Tournament	Opponent(s)	Result
1	1982	Ebel European Masters Swiss Open	(Scotland) Bill Longmuir	Won with par on third extra hole
2	1987	Suze Open	(Spain) Seve Ballesteros	Lost to par on first extra hole
3	1989	Wang Four Stars	(Australia) Craig Parry	Lost to birdie on first extra hole
4	1989	Carroll's Irish Open	(Republic of Ireland) Philip Walton	Won with birdie on second extra hole
5	1993	Honda Open	(England) Paul Broadhurst, (Sweden) Johan Ryström, (Scotland) Sam Torrance	Torrance won with birdie on first extra hole
6	1996	Johnnie Walker Classic	(Scotland) Andrew Coltart	Won with birdie on third extra hole
7	1997	Dubai Desert Classic	(Australia) Richard Green, (Australia) Greg Norman	Green won with birdie on first extra hole
8	1999	Linde German Masters	(Spain) Sergio García, (Republic of Ireland) Pádraig Harrington	García won with birdie on second extra hole Woosnam eliminated by par on first hole

=== Asia Golf Circuit wins (1) ===
No.	Date	Tournament	Winning score	Margin of victory	Runners-up
1	1 Mar 1987	United Airlines Hong Kong Open	−9 (70-71-65-69=275)	4 strokes	(Northern Ireland) David Feherty, (Scotland) Sam Torrance

=== Korean Tour wins (1) ===
No.	Date	Tournament	Winning score	Margin of victory	Runner-up
1	1 Jun 1997	Hyundai Motor Masters	−8 (71-74-67-68=280)	Playoff	(Scotland) Sandy Lyle

Korean Tour playoff record (1–0)

No.	Year	Tournament	Opponent	Result
1	1997	Hyundai Motor Masters	(Scotland) Sandy Lyle	Won with birdie on second extra hole

=== Safari Circuit wins (2) ===
No.	Date	Tournament	Winning score	Margin of victory	Runner(s)-up
1	24 Mar 1985	Zambia Open	−10 (71-72-69-70=282)	2 strokes	(England) Gordon J. Brand, (Scotland) Brian Marchbank
2	9 Mar 1986	555 Kenya Open	−11 (70-64-67-72=273)	Playoff	(Scotland) Bill Longmuir

=== Other wins (11) ===
No.	Date	Tournament	Winning score	Margin of victory	Runner(s)-up
1	18 Aug 1979	News of the World Under-23 Match Play Championship	4 and 3		(England) John Hay
2	31 Oct 1982	Cacharel World Under-25 Championship	+2 (71-69-74-76=290)	5 strokes	(England) Keith Waters
3	18 Oct 1987	Suntory World Match Play Championship	1 up		(Scotland) Sandy Lyle
4	21 Nov 1987	World Cup (with (Wales) David Llewellyn)	−2 (143-145-138-148=574)	Playoff	Scotland − Sandy Lyle and Sam Torrance
5	21 Nov 1987	World Cup Individual Trophy	−14 (67-70-65-72=274)	5 strokes	(Scotland) Sandy Lyle
6	6 Dec 1987	Nedbank Million Dollar Challenge	−14 (67-71-68-68=274)	4 strokes	(England) Nick Faldo
7	1988	Welsh National PGA Championship	−3 (137)		
8	23 Sep 1990	Suntory World Match Play Championship (2)	4 and 2		(Zimbabwe) Mark McNulty
9	3 Nov 1991	World Cup Individual Trophy (2)	−15 (70-69-67-67=273)	3 strokes	(Germany) Bernhard Langer
10	13 Nov 1991	PGA Grand Slam of Golf	−9 (69-66=135)	4 strokes	(Australia) Ian Baker-Finch
11	14 Oct 2001	Cisco World Match Play Championship (3)	2 and 1		(Republic of Ireland) Pádraig Harrington

Other playoff record (1–2)

No.	Year	Tournament	Opponent(s)	Result
1	1987	World Cup (with (Wales) David Llewellyn)	Scotland − Sandy Lyle and Sam Torrance	Won with par on second extra hole
2	1992	World Cup Individual Trophy	(Australia) Brett Ogle	Lost to birdie on first extra hole
3	1996	Johnnie Walker Super Tour	(South Africa) Ernie Els	Lost to par on first extra hole

=== Champions Tour wins (1) ===
No.	Date	Tournament	Winning score	Margin of victory	Runners-up
1	3 May 2015	Insperity Invitational	−11 (71-66-68=205)	Playoff	(United States) Tom Lehman, (United States) Kenny Perry

Champions Tour playoff record (1–0)

No.	Year	Tournament	Opponents	Result
1	2015	Insperity Invitational	(United States) Tom Lehman, (United States) Kenny Perry	Won with birdie on first extra hole

=== European Senior Tour wins (5) ===
No.	Date	Tournament	Winning score	Margin of victory	Runner(s)-up
1	1 Jun 2008	Parkridge Polish Seniors Championship	−14 (71-68-63=202)	1 stroke	(Spain) Domingo Hospital
2	6 Jul 2008	Russian Seniors Open	−12 (67-67-70=204)	3 strokes	(Paraguay) Ángel Franco
3	7 Jun 2009	Irish Seniors Open	−2 (74-70-67=211)	Playoff	(United States) Bob Boyd
4	19 Jun 2011	Berenberg Bank Masters	−9 (71-70-66=207)	2 strokes	(Chile) Ángel Fernández
5	12 Oct 2014	Dutch Senior Open	−11 (71-69-68=208)	5 strokes	(England) Philip Golding, (England) David J. Russell, (England) George Ryall

European Senior Tour playoff record (1–1)

No.	Year	Tournament	Opponent(s)	Result
1	2009	Irish Seniors Open	(United States) Bob Boyd	Won with birdie on third extra hole
2	2016	Acorn Jersey Open	(Austria) Gordon Manson, (England) Gary Wolstenholme	Manson won with birdie on third extra hole

=== Japan PGA Senior Tour wins (1) ===
No.	Date	Tournament	Winning score	Margin of victory	Runner-up
1	15 Nov 2009	PGA Handa Cup Philanthropy Senior Tournament	−4 (75-70-68-71=284)	3 strokes	(Japan) Gohei Sato

== Major championships ==
=== Wins (1) ===
Year	Championship	54 holes	Winning score	Margin	Runner-up
1991	Masters Tournament	1 shot lead	−11 (72-66-67-72=277)	1 stroke	(Spain) José María Olazábal

=== Results timeline ===
Results not in chronological order in 2020.

Tournament	1982	1983	1984	1985	1986	1987	1988	1989
Masters Tournament							CUT	T14
U.S. Open								T2
The Open Championship	CUT	CUT	CUT	T16	T3	T8	T25	T49
PGA Championship					T30	CUT	WD	6

Tournament	1990	1991	1992	1993	1994	1995	1996	1997	1998	1999
Masters Tournament	T30	1	T19	T17	T46	T17	T29	T39	T16	T14
U.S. Open	T21	T55	T6	T52	CUT	T21	T79	CUT	CUT	
The Open Championship	T4	T17	T5	T51	CUT	T49	CUT	T24	T57	T24
PGA Championship	T31	T48	CUT	T22	T9	CUT	T36	CUT	T29	CUT

Tournament	2000	2001	2002	2003	2004	2005	2006	2007	2008	2009
Masters Tournament	T40	CUT	CUT	CUT	CUT	CUT	CUT		44	CUT
U.S. Open										
The Open Championship	T68	T3	T37	T72		CUT				
PGA Championship	CUT	T51	CUT		CUT					

Tournament	2010	2011	2012	2013	2014	2015	2016	2017	2018
Masters Tournament	CUT	CUT	CUT	CUT	CUT	CUT	CUT	CUT	CUT
U.S. Open									
The Open Championship									
PGA Championship									

Tournament	2019	2020	2021
Masters Tournament	CUT		CUT
PGA Championship			
U.S. Open			
The Open Championship		NT	

Win
Top 10
Did not play

CUT = missed the half way cut (3rd round cut in 1982 and 1984 Open Championships)
WD = withdrew
"T" indicates a tie for a place
NT = No tournament due to COVID-19 pandemic

=== Summary ===
Tournament	Wins	2nd	3rd	Top-5	Top-10	Top-25	Events	Cuts made
Masters Tournament	1	0	0	1	1	7	32	13
PGA Championship	0	0	0	0	2	3	18	9
U.S. Open	0	1	0	1	2	4	10	7
The Open Championship	0	0	2	4	5	10	23	17
Totals	1	1	2	6	10	24	83	46

- Most consecutive cuts made – 15 (1989 Masters – 1992 Open Championship)
- Longest streak of top-10s – 2 (1992 U.S. Open – 1992 Open Championship)

== Results in The Players Championship ==
Tournament	1988	1989	1990	1991	1992	1993	1994	1995	1996	1997	1998	1999	2000	2001
The Players Championship	CUT			T15	CUT	T39	CUT	T23	CUT	WD	WD	CUT	T66	T70

Did not play

CUT = missed the halfway cut
WD = withdrew
"T" indicates a tie for a place

== Results in World Golf Championships ==
Tournament	1999	2000
Match Play	R64	
Championship		
Invitational		T33

Did not play

QF, R16, R32, R64 = Round in which player lost in match play
"T" = Tied

== Results in senior major championships ==
Results are not in chronological order.

Tournament	2008	2009	2010	2011	2012	2013	2014	2015	2016	2017	2018	2019	2020	2021	2022	2023	2024	2025
The Tradition							T43		T52	T57	T56	T12	NT	WD				
Senior PGA Championship	T16	T37				T59	CUT		CUT	T63			NT					
Senior Players Championship										T41								
U.S. Senior Open	T23	T22							4	T37			NT					
The Senior Open Championship	T13	T19	T8	T16	T10	CUT	75		T44	T45	WD	T36	NT	T24	T29	CUT	CUT	T70

Top 10
Did not play

CUT = missed the halfway cut
WD = withdrew
"T" indicates a tie for a place
NT = no tournament due to COVID-19 pandemic

== Team appearances ==
- World Cup (representing Wales): 1980, 1982, 1983, 1984, 1985, 1987 (team and individual winner), 1990, 1991 (individual winner), 1992, 1993, 1994, 1996, 1997, 1998, 2000, 2002, 2003
- Hennessy Cognac Cup (representing Great Britain & Ireland): 1982 (winners), (representing Wales) 1984
- Ryder Cup (representing Europe): 1983, 1985 (winners), 1987 (winners), 1989 (tied – cup retained), 1991, 1993, 1995 (winners), 1997 (winners), 2006 (winners, non-playing captain)
- Alfred Dunhill Cup (representing Wales): 1985, 1986, 1988, 1989, 1990, 1991, 1993, 1995, 2000
- Four Tours World Championship (representing Europe): 1985, 1986, 1987, 1989, 1990
- Seve Trophy (representing Great Britain & Ireland): 2000, 2002 (winners)
- UBS Cup (representing the Rest of the World): 2001, 2002, 2003 (tie), 2004
- Royal Trophy (representing Europe): 2006 (winners)

== See also ==
- List of golfers with most European Tour wins
- List of golfers with most European Senior Tour wins
