= Lawrence Batley International =

Tournament information
- Location: Southport, England
- Established: 1981
- Course: Royal Birkdale Golf Club
- Par: 72
- Tour: European Tour
- Format: Stroke play
- Prize fund: £150,000
- Month played: August
- Final year: 1987

Tournament record score
- Aggregate: 266 Nick Faldo (1983)
- To par: −18 as above

Final champion
- (United States) Mark O'Meara
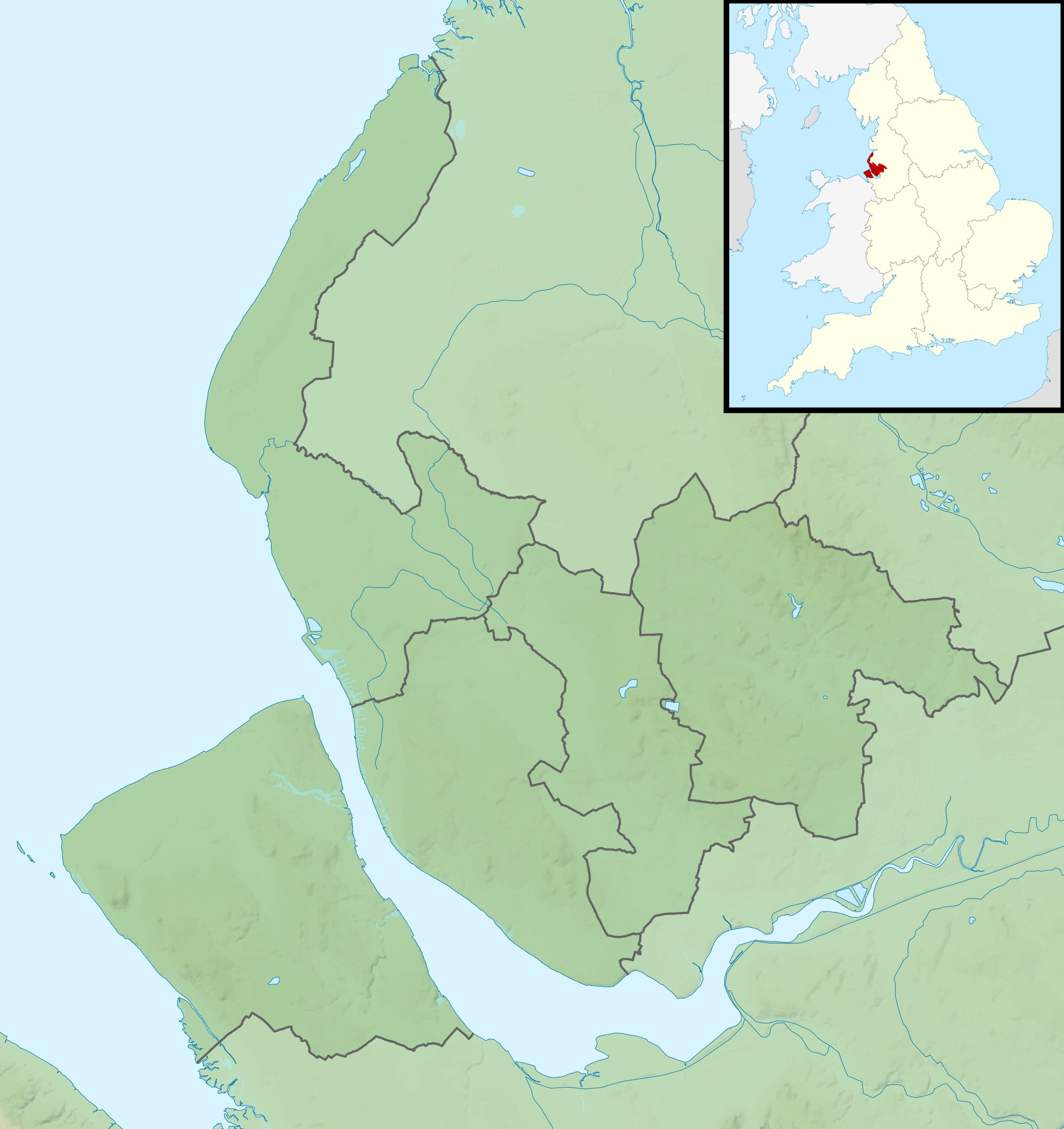
- Location in England Location in Merseyside

The Lawrence Batley International was a European Tour golf tournament which was played annually from 1981 to 1987. The first three editions were played at Bingley St Ives, Bradford, the next three at Ryder Cup venue The Belfry, and the final edition at Open Championship venue Royal Birkdale. The six different winners included four major championship winners: Nick Faldo, Sandy Lyle, Mark O'Meara and Ian Woosnam. In 1987, the prize fund was £150,000, which was the fourth smallest on the European Tour that year.

== Winners ==
Year	Winner	Score	To par	Margin of victory	Runner(s)-up
Lawrence Batley International
1987	(United States) Mark O'Meara	271	−17	3 strokes	(England) Carl Mason
Lawrence Batley International T.P.C.
1986	(Wales) Ian Woosnam	277	−11	7 strokes	(Scotland) Ken Brown (Spain) José María Cañizares
Lawrence Batley International Golf Classic
1985	(Australia) Graham Marsh	283	−5	2 strokes	(United States) Rick Hartmann
1984	(Spain) José Rivero	280	−8	1 stroke	(Spain) José María Cañizares
Lawrence Batley International
1983	(England) Nick Faldo	266	−18	4 strokes	(England) Warren Humphreys (England) Brian Waites (England) Paul Way
1982	(Scotland) Sandy Lyle (2)	269	−15	2 strokes	(Spain) Manuel Piñero
1981	(Scotland) Sandy Lyle	280	−4	2 strokes	(England) Nick Faldo
