= 1981 Open Championship =

Coordinates: 51.274°N 1.367°E

Tournament information
- Dates: 16–19 July 1981
- Location: Sandwich, England
- Course: Royal St George's Golf Club
- Tours: European Tour; PGA Tour

Statistics
- Par: 70
- Length: 6,827 yards (6,243 m)
- Field: 153 players 81 after 1st cut 61 after 2nd cut
- Cut: 150 (+10) (1st cut); 222 (+12) (2nd cut)
- Prize fund: £200,000 $400,000
- Winner's share: £25,000 $50,000

Champion
- (United States) Bill Rogers
- 276 (−4)

Location in England

The 1981 Open Championship was a men's major golf championship and the 110th Open Championship, held from 16 to 19 July at Royal St George's Golf Club in Sandwich, England. Bill Rogers won his only major championship, four strokes ahead of runner-up Bernhard Langer. The Open returned to Royal St. George's for the first time since 1949, making it a new venue for all; no former champions finished in the top ten.

== Round summaries ==
=== First round ===
Thursday, 16 July 1981

Place	Player	Score	To par
T1	(Argentina) Vicente Fernández	70	E
T1	(England) Nick Job	70	E
T3	(Japan) Isao Aoki	71	+1
T3	(Australia) David Graham	71	+1
T3	(England) Tony Jacklin	71	+1
T3	(United States) Johnny Miller	71	+1
T3	(New Zealand) Simon Owen	71	+1
T3	(United States) Hal Sutton (a)	71	+1
T9	(England) Howard Clark	72	+2
T9	(United States) Ben Crenshaw	72	+2
T9	(England) David Jagger	72	+2
T9	(England) Mark James	72	+2
T9	(Australia) Greg Norman	72	+2
T9	(United States) Arnold Palmer	72	+2
T9	(United States) Bill Rogers	72	+2
T9	(Scotland) Sam Torrance	72	+2

=== Second round ===
Friday, 17 July 1981

Place	Player	Score	To par
1	(United States) Bill Rogers	72-66=138	−2
T2	(United States) Ben Crenshaw	72-67=139	−1
T2	(England) Nick Job	70-69=139	−1
4	(West Germany) Bernhard Langer	73-67=140	E
5	(Scotland) Sam Torrance	72-69=141	+1
T6	(Australia) David Graham	71-71=142	+2
T6	(England) Tony Jacklin	71-71=142	+2
T6	(England) Mark James	72-70=142	+2
T6	(United States) Tom Watson	73-69=142	+2
T10	(England) Gordon J. Brand	78-65=143	+3
T10	(Australia) Bill Dunk	76-67=143	+3
T10	(Wales) Trevor Powell	75-68=143	+3
T10	(England) Peter Townsend	73-70=143	+3

Amateurs: Godwin (+6), Evans (+8), Sutton (+8), Chapman (+10), Keppler (+10), Walton (+10), Young (+10), Brand (+12), R. Mitchell (+12), Sherborne (+12), Ploujoux (+14), Thomas (+14), Blakeman (+15), Planchin (+15), Seamer (+15), Ling (+17), C. Mitchell (+18), Pook (+19), Ambridge (+20), Heib (+22), Lawrence (+23), Hall (+24), Sviland (+24).

=== Third round ===
Saturday, 18 July 1981

Place	Player	Score	To par
1	(United States) Bill Rogers	72-66-67=205	−5
T2	(England) Mark James	72-70-68=210	E
T2	(West Germany) Bernhard Langer	73-67-70=210	E
T4	(Japan) Isao Aoki	71-73-69=213	+3
T4	(United States) Raymond Floyd	74-70-69=213	+3
T6	(England) Nick Faldo	77-68-69=214	+4
T6	(England) Nick Job	70-69-75=214	+4
T6	(Scotland) Sam Torrance	72-69-73=214	+4
T6	(United States) Lee Trevino	77-67-70=214	+4
T10	(United States) Ben Crenshaw	72-67-76=215	+5
T10	(England) Tony Jacklin	71-71-73=215	+5
T10	(Australia) Brian Jones	73-76-66=215	+5
T10	(New Zealand) Simon Owen	71-74-70=215	+5
T10	(United States) Jerry Pate	73-73-69=215	+5
T10	(Spain) Manuel Piñero	73-74-68=215	+5

Amateurs: Godwin (+8), Sutton (+11), Keppler (+13), Evans (+15), Young (+15), Chapman (+16), Walton (+16).

=== Final round ===
Sunday, 19 July 1981

Champion
Silver Medal winner (low amateur)
(a) = amateur
(c) = past champion

Place	Player	Score	To par	Money (£)
1	(United States) Bill Rogers	72-66-67-71=276	−4	25,000
2	(West Germany) Bernhard Langer	73-67-70-70=280	E	17,500
T3	(United States) Raymond Floyd	74-70-69-70=283	+3	11,750
T3	(England) Mark James	72-70-68-73=283	+3	11,750
5	(Scotland) Sam Torrance	72-69-73-70=284	+4	8,500
T6	(United States) Bruce Lietzke	76-69-71-69=285	+5	7,750
T6	(Spain) Manuel Piñero	73-74-68-70=285	+5	7,750
T8	(England) Howard Clark	72-76-70-68=286	+6	6,500
T8	(United States) Ben Crenshaw	72-67-76-71=286	+6	6,500
T8	(Australia) Brian Jones	73-76-66-71=286	+6	6,500

Leaderboard below the top 10
Place	Player	Score	To par	Money (£)
T11	(Japan) Isao Aoki	71-73-69-74=287	+7	5,000
T11	(England) Nick Faldo	77-68-69-73=287	+7	5,000
T11	(United States) Lee Trevino (c)	77-67-70-73=287	+7	5,000
T14	(Scotland) Brian Barnes	76-70-70-72=288	+8	3,240
T14	(Republic of Ireland) Eamonn Darcy	79-69-70-70=288	+8	3,240
T14	(Australia) David Graham	71-74-72-72=288	+8	3,240
T14	(England) Nick Job	70-69-75-74=288	+8	3,240
T14	(Scotland) Sandy Lyle	73-73-71-71=288	+8	3,240
T19	(England) Gordon J. Brand	78-65-74-72=289	+9	2,012
T19	(Australia) Graham Marsh	75-71-72-71=289	+9	2,012
T19	(United States) Jerry Pate	73-73-69-74=289	+9	2,012
T19	(England) Peter Townsend	73-70-73-73=289	+9	2,012
T23	(United States) Hubert Green	75-72-74-69=290	+10	1,706
T23	(England) Tony Jacklin (c)	71-71-73-75=290	+10	1,706
T23	(Republic of Ireland) Mark McNulty	74-74-74-68=290	+10	1,706
T23	(United States) Jack Nicklaus (c)	83-66-71-70=290	+10	1,706
T23	(New Zealand) Simon Owen	71-74-70-75=290	+10	1,706
T23	(United States) Arnold Palmer (c)	72-74-73-71=290	+10	1,706
T23	(Zimbabwe) Nick Price	77-68-76-69=290	+10	1,706
T23	(United States) Tom Watson (c)	73-69-75-73=290	+10	1,706
T31	(England) John Morgan	77-72-73-69=291	+11	1,225
T31	(Australia) Greg Norman	72-75-72-72=291	+11	1,225
T31	(Wales) Trevor Powell	75-68-73-75=291	+11	1,225
T31	(Republic of Ireland) Des Smyth	77-67-73-74=291	+11	1,225
T35	(New Zealand) Bob Charles	77-71-71-73=292	+12	971
T35	(Australia) Bill Dunk	76-67-77-72=292	+12	971
T35	(England) Tommy Horton	75-73-73-71=292	+12	971
T35	(Japan) Masashi Ozaki	75-72-71-74=292	+12	971
T39	(Spain) Seve Ballesteros (c)	75-72-74-72=293	+13	826
T39	(England) Neil Coles	74-73-73-73=293	+13	826
T39	(Australia) Rodger Davis	74-71-74-74=293	+13	826
T39	(United States) Johnny Miller (c)	71-73-73-76=293	+13	826
T39	(Argentina) Florentino Molina	78-68-74-73=293	+13	826
T44	(Scotland) Ken Brown	74-72-74-74=294	+14	805
T44	(Australia) Terry Gale	73-73-71-77=294	+14	805
T44	(United States) Ron Streck	78-70-72-74=294	+14	805
T47	(Brazil) Jaime Gonzalez	76-70-76-73=295	+15	805
T47	(United States) Mark O'Meara	74-73-73-75=295	+15	805
T47	(United States) Hal Sutton (a)	71-77-73-74=295	+15	0
T50	(Republic of Ireland) David Jones	77-71-74-74-296	+16	805
T50	(England) David Thorp	76-69-74-77=296	+16	805
T50	(England) Brian Waites	75-69-74-78=296	+16	805
T53	(England) Garry Cullen	78-70-73-76=297	+17	770
T53	(Australia) Mike Ferguson	75-72-71-79=297	+17	770
T53	(England) Eddie Poland	75-75-72-75=297	+17	770
T56	(England) Warren Humphreys	76-71-74-77=298	+18	770
T56	(England) Noel Hunt	74-73-75-76=298	+18	770
T58	(England) Geoff Godwin (a)	75-71-72-81=299	+19	0
T58	(Republic of Ireland) John O'Leary	73-74-75-77=299	+19	770
T58	(United States) Payne Stewart	73-75-74-77=299	+19	770
61	(United States) Dick McClean	75-73-72-82=303	+23	770
2nd CUT	(Argentina) Vicente Fernández	70-75-78=223	+13	490
2nd CUT	(England) John Fowler	74-73-76=223	+13	490
2nd CUT	(England) Stephen Keppler (a)	79-71-72=223	+13	0
2nd CUT	(England) Peter Oosterhuis	74-75-74=223	+13	490
2nd CUT	(South Africa) Gary Player (c)	81-68-75=224	+14	490
2nd CUT	(South Africa) John Bland	75-75-75=225	+15	490
2nd CUT	(Spain) José María Cañizares	77-70-78=225	+15	490
2nd CUT	(Wales) Duncan Evans (a)	79-69-77=225	+15	0
2nd CUT	(Italy) Massimo Mannelli	75-74-76=225	+15	490
2nd CUT	(England) Martin Poxon	76-74-75=225	+15	490
2nd CUT	(Scotland) Ian Young (a)	76-74-75=225	+15	0
2nd CUT	(South Africa) Tienie Britz	73-76-77=226	+16	490
2nd CUT	(England) Roger Chapman (a)	76-74-76=226	+16	0
2nd CUT	(Scotland) Ross Drummond	78-72-76=226	+16	490
2nd CUT	(England) David Jagger	72-74-80=226	+16	490
2nd CUT	(Australia) Noel Ratcliffe	77-70-79=226	+16	490
2nd CUT	(Republic of Ireland) Philip Walton (a)	77-73-76=226	+16	0
2nd CUT	(England) Mark Thomas	77-70-80=227	+17	490
2nd CUT	(Australia) Stewart Ginn	79-71-78=228	+18	490
2nd CUT	(England) Maurice Bembridge	75-74-80=229	+19	490
1st CUT	(Scotland) Bernard Gallacher	79-72=151	+11	315
1st CUT	(Scotland) Steve Martin	79-72=151	+11	315
1st CUT	(England) Chris Moody	75-76=151	+11	315
1st CUT	(Mexico) Andrew Payne	74-77=151	+11	315
1st CUT	(United States) Craig Stadler	83-68=151	+11	315
1st CUT	(England) Mike Steadman	79-72=151	+11	315
1st CUT	(England) Ross Whitehead	76-75=151	+11	315
1st CUT	(Spain) Juan Anglada	77-75=152	+12	315
1st CUT	(South Africa) Hugh Baiocchi	76-76=152	+12	315
1st CUT	(Scotland) Gordon Brand Jnr (a)	77-75=152	+12	0
1st CUT	(Wales) Lawrence Farmer	77-75=152	+12	315
1st CUT	(Spain) Antonio Garrido	78-74=152	+12	315
1st CUT	(South Africa) Dale Hayes	80-72=152	+12	315
1st CUT	(England) Robert Mitchell (a)	78-74=152	+12	0
1st CUT	(England) David J. Russell	79-73=152	+12	315
1st CUT	(England) Andrew Sherborne (a)	74-78=152	+12	0
1st CUT	(England) Mike Gallagher	75-78=153	+13	315
1st CUT	(England) Phil Loxley	77-76=153	+13	315
1st CUT	(England) Peter Barber	79-75=154	+14	315
1st CUT	(United States) Rafe Botts	77-77=154	+14	315
1st CUT	(Scotland) David Ingram	80-74=154	+14	315
1st CUT	(South Africa) Bobby Lincoln	79-75=154	+14	315
1st CUT	(Scotland) Bill McColl	76-78=154	+14	315
1st CUT	(Scotland) Mike Miller	82-72=154	+14	315
1st CUT	(England) Ian Mosey	78-76=154	+14	315
1st CUT	(France) Philippe Ploujoux (a)	80-74=154	+14	0
1st CUT	(Wales) Paul Thomas (a)	79-75=154	+14	0
1st CUT	(Japan) Haruo Yasuda	75-79=154	+14	315
1st CUT	(England) David Blakeman (a)	78-77=155	+15	0
1st CUT	(Spain) Manuel Calero	81-74=155	+15	315
1st CUT	(England) Charles Cox	78-77=155	+15	315
1st CUT	(South Africa) Harold Henning	73-82=155	+15	315
1st CUT	(West Germany) Carlo Knauss	79-76=155	+15	315
1st CUT	(England) Garry Logan	81-74=155	+15	315
1st CUT	(Scotland) Bill Longmuir	78-77=155	+15	315
1st CUT	(Austria) Gordon Manson	78-77=155	+15	315
1st CUT	(England) Tim Planchin (a)	76-79=155	+15	0
1st CUT	(England) Stephen Rolley	80-75=155	+15	315
1st CUT	(England) R. W. Seamer (a)	79-76=155	+15	0
1st CUT	(England) Paul Carrigill	80-76=156	+16	315
1st CUT	(England) Andrew Chandler	78-78=156	+16	315
1st CUT	(England) Brian Lawson	82-74=156	+16	315
1st CUT	(England) David Williams	82-74=156	+16	315
1st CUT	(England) Roger Fidler	82-75=157	+17	315
1st CUT	(England) Stephen Ling (a)	82-75=157	+17	0
1st CUT	(Sweden) Stuart Meiklejohn	81-76=157	+17	315
1st CUT	(England) Roger Stephens	77-80=157	+17	315
1st CUT	(Spain) Manuel Ballesteros	77-81=158	+18	315
1st CUT	(England) David M. Edwards	81-77=158	+18	315
1st CUT	(England) Carl Mason	82-76=158	+18	315
1st CUT	(England) Tony Minshall	79-79=158	+18	315
1st CUT	(England) Christopher Mitchell (a)	81-77=158	+18	0
1st CUT	(England) Rae Sargent	79-79=158	+18	315
1st CUT	(England) Steve Barr	83-76=159	+19	315
1st CUT	(Australia) Paul Foley	78-81=159	+19	315
1st CUT	(Scotland) Graeme Pook (a)	78-81=159	+19	0
1st CUT	(England) Brian Thompson	80-79=159	+19	315
1st CUT	(England) John Ambridge	83-77=160	+20	0
1st CUT	(England) Michael King	84-76=160	+20	315
1st CUT	(England) Chris Phillips	84-76=160	+20	315
1st CUT	(England) David Regan	85-75=160	+20	315
1st CUT	(England) Grahame Cowlishaw	82-79=161	+21	315
1st CUT	(England) Nick Brown	85-77=162	+22	315
1st CUT	(England) Nick Brunyard	81-81=162	+22	315
1st CUT	(England) John Heib (a)	82-80=162	+22	0
1st CUT	(England) Andrew Griffiths	86-77=163	+23	315
1st CUT	(England) Mark Lawrence (a)	83-80=163	+23	0
1st CUT	(Scotland) R. J. Hall (a)	83-81=164	+24	0
1st CUT	(Sweden) Tore Sviland (a)	86-78=164	+24	0
1st CUT	(Scotland) Ian Lee	91-81=172	+32	315
DQ	(England) Jimmy Heggarty	75-72=147	+7	315
DQ	(England) Philip Clark	75-74=149	+9	315

- The exchange rate at the time was approximately 1.87 dollars (US) per pound sterling.
