= 1985 European Tour =

Golf tour season

1985 European Tour season
- Duration: 11 April 1985 – 2 November 1985
- Number of official events: 26
- Most wins: (Spain) Seve Ballesteros (4)
- Order of Merit: (Scotland) Sandy Lyle
- Golfer of the Year: (West Germany) Bernhard Langer
- Sir Henry Cotton Rookie of the Year: (Wales) Paul Thomas

The 1985 European Tour, titled as the 1985 PGA European Tour, was the 14th season of the European Tour, the main professional golf tour in Europe since its inaugural season in 1972.

== Changes for 1985 ==
The season was made up of 26 tournaments counting for the Order of Merit, and some non-counting "Approved Special Events".

There were several changes from the previous season, with the GSI L'Equipe Open replacing the Timex Open; the return of the British Masters and the Bob Hope Classic, which was rebranded as the Four Stars National Pro-Celebrity; and the loss of the Tournament Players Championship and the Celtic International.

In addition, the Dunhill Cup, a new team event devised by Mark McCormack and held over the Old Course at St Andrews, was added to the schedule but did not count towards the Order of Merit; with a prize fund of US$1,200,000 it was the richest tournament in the world, surpassing the Nedbank Million Dollar Challenge in South Africa.

=== Rule changes ===
In 1985, the European Tour became "All-Exempt", meaning that for the first time tournaments did not have their own pre-qualifying rounds. The final two rounds of all major tournaments were played as two-balls, having previously been three-balls.

=== Order of Merit name change ===
In April, it was announced that Epson would take over the title sponsorship of the Order of Merit from Sperry Corporation, being renamed as the Epson Order of Merit.

== Schedule ==
The following table lists official events during the 1985 season.

Date	Tournament	Host country	Purse (£)	Winner (Note: The number in brackets after each winner's name is the number of European Tour events they had won up to and including that tournament. This information is only shown for European Tour members and are inclusive of the three United States-based major championships which were included on the schedule for the first time in 1998, with earlier editions having retrospectively been recognised as official tour wins.)	Notes
14 Apr	Masters Tournament	United States	US$700,000	(West Germany) Bernhard Langer (12)	Major championship (Note: Unofficial money event at the time, but retrospectively counted as an official win.)
21 Apr	Tunisian Open	Tunisia	70,000	(England) Stephen Bennett (1)	
28 Apr	Cepsa Madrid Open	Spain	100,000	(Spain) Manuel Piñero (8)	
5 May	Italian Open	Italy	85,000	(Spain) Manuel Piñero (9)	
12 May	Car Care Plan International	England	110,000	(England) David J. Russell (1)	
19 May	GSI L'Equipe Open	France	75,000	(England) Mark James (7)	New tournament
27 May	Whyte & Mackay PGA Championship	England	180,000	(England) Paul Way (2)	
2 Jun	Four Stars National Pro-Celebrity	England	140,000	(Scotland) Ken Brown (4)	Pro-Am
10 Jun	Dunhill British Masters	England	200,000	(United States) Lee Trevino (n/a)	
16 Jun	Jersey Open	Jersey	75,000	(England) Howard Clark (5)	
16 Jun	U.S. Open	United States	US$650,000	(United States) Andy North (n/a)	Major championship
23 Jun	Carroll's Irish Open	Ireland	120,000	(Spain) Seve Ballesteros (24)	
30 Jun	Johnnie Walker Monte Carlo Open	France	125,000	(Scotland) Sam Torrance (11)	
7 Jul	Peugeot Open de France	France	80,000	(Spain) Seve Ballesteros (25)	
13 Jul	Lawrence Batley International Golf Classic	England	120,000	(Australia) Graham Marsh (9)	
21 Jul	The Open Championship	England	530,000	(Scotland) Sandy Lyle (11)	Major championship
28 Jul	KLM Dutch Open	Netherlands	120,000	(Australia) Graham Marsh (10)	
4 Aug	Scandinavian Enterprise Open	Sweden	130,000	(Australia) Ian Baker-Finch (1)	
11 Aug	Glasgow Open	Scotland	90,000	(England) Howard Clark (6)	
11 Aug	PGA Championship	United States	US$700,000	(United States) Hubert Green (n/a)	Major championship
18 Aug	Benson & Hedges International Open	England	150,000	(Scotland) Sandy Lyle (12)	
25 Aug	Lufthansa German Open	West Germany	100,000	(West Germany) Bernhard Langer (13)	
1 Sep	Panasonic European Open	England	200,000	(West Germany) Bernhard Langer (14)	
8 Sep	Ebel European Masters Swiss Open	Switzerland	190,000	(United States) Craig Stadler (n/a)	
22 Sep	Sanyo Open	Spain	120,000	(Spain) Seve Ballesteros (26)	
6 Oct	Trophée Lancôme	France	120,000	(Zimbabwe) Nick Price (2)	Limited-field event
13 Oct	Compagnie de Chauffe Cannes Open	France	80,000	(England) Robert Lee (1)	
27 Oct	Benson & Hedges Spanish Open	Spain	85,000	(Spain) Seve Ballesteros (27)	
2 Nov	Portuguese Open	Portugal	65,000	(England) Warren Humphreys (1)	

=== Unofficial events ===
The following events were sanctioned by the European Tour, but did not carry official money, nor were wins official.

Date	Tournament	Host country	Purse (£)	Winner(s)	Notes
15 Sep	Ryder Cup	England	n/a	Team Europe	Team event
29 Sep	Suntory World Match Play Championship	England	180,000	(Spain) Seve Ballesteros	Limited-field event
20 Oct	Dunhill Cup	Scotland	US$1,200,000	Team Australia	New tournament Team event
24 Nov	World Cup	United States	US$743,000	(Canada) Dave Barr and (Canada) Dan Halldorson	Team event
24 Nov	World Cup Individual Trophy	United States	US$743,000	(England) Howard Clark	

== Order of Merit ==
The Order of Merit was titled as the Epson Order of Merit and was based on prize money won during the season, calculated in Pound sterling.

Position	Player	Prize money (£)
1	(Scotland) Sandy Lyle	162,553
2	(West Germany) Bernhard Langer	115,716
3	(Spain) Seve Ballesteros	103,042
4	(Wales) Ian Woosnam	82,235
5	(Scotland) Sam Torrance	79,567
6	(England) Howard Clark	79,386
7	(Spain) Manuel Piñero	71,116
8	(Spain) José María Cañizares	65,633
9	(Scotland) Gordon Brand Jnr	65,571
10	(England) Paul Way	63,097

== Awards ==
Award	Winner	Ref.
Golfer of the Year	(West Germany) Bernhard Langer	
Sir Henry Cotton Rookie of the Year	(Wales) Paul Thomas	
