= Stuart Reese =

New Zealand professional golfer

Personal information
- Nationality: New Zealand
- Born: 16 August 1954 (age 72)

Career
- Sport: Golf
- Status: Professional
- Former tour: PGA Tour of Australasia
- Professional wins: 4

Number of wins by tour
- PGA Tour of Australasia: 1
- Other: 3

Stuart Reese (born 16 August 1954) is a professional golfer from New Zealand. Reese was one of New Zealand's top amateur golfers in the 1970s, winning the 1975 New Zealand Amateur. Reese turned professional shortly thereafter, winning a number of minor tournaments in the Pacific islands before culminating with a win at the 1982 New Zealand PGA Championship. Late in his career, Reese has worked primarily as a swing instructor, advising a number of notable players, including superstars Tiger Woods and Lydia Ko.

== Early life ==
Reese is from Hamilton, New Zealand. As a youth, he played at Hamilton Golf Club. In 1972, he won the New Zealand Under 19 Championship held at Christchurch Golf Club.

== Amateur career ==
In 1974, Reese played the New Zealand Open and won the Bledisloe Cup, awarded to the best amateur score, along with fellow amateur D.L. Beggs. In August, he played well through the first three rounds of the Air New Zealand Fiji Open, a professional tournament. Reese was at 211, one back of leader Stewart Ginn. However, he shot several over-par on the last day and was not in contention. In October 1975, as a 21-year-old, Reese won the New Zealand Amateur. He defeated Stephen Barron, six years his junior, 10 & 9 over the course of 36-hole match.

The following month, Reese represented New Zealand at the Commonwealth Tournament. The event was held at Royal Durban Country Club in Durban, South Africa. During Saturday's play New Zealand played Canada. Reese teamed up with Ed McDougall during the day's foursome, playing against Jim Nelford and Cec Ferguson. The Canadians won 3 & 2. In singles play Reese also lost, losing "convincingly" to Edmonton's Ken Tamke 6 & 5. Overall, New Zealand finished in last place among the four teams.

== Professional career ==
In 1976, Reese turned professional. In August, he received media attention for one of the first times as a professional golfer. Reese opened with a 69 (−3) at the Fiji Open to put himself near the lead.

In February 1977, Reese played the South Australian Open at Royal Adelaide Golf Club. He was at 215 (−4) after three rounds, one back of leaders Noel Ratcliffe and Brian Jones. Later in 1977, Reese played on the European Tour for the first time. He played in six events, making the cut only twice, failing to record anything better than a 69th-place finish. In November, Reese received some attention for his play at the Colgate Champion of Champions, opening with a 69 (−3), putting him the top ten. In January 1978, he shot an opening round 70 (−2) at the Traralgon Loy Yang Classic to put himself in the top ten. Reese shot one-under-par for the remainder of the tournament and finished in a tie for twelfth.

In 1978, Reese did not return to Europe. However, he did play in North America and Australia and recorded some highlights. In early June, Reese played the Homestead Wasatch Mountain Open, a two-round tournament in Midway, Utah. He opened with a 69 (−3) for the joint lead. In the final round he shot a 72 to finish joint fourth, four back. In late July, Reese played the Sierra Nevada Open Invitational in Reno, Nevada. He opened with a 69 (−3) at Tahoe-Donner Golf Course to put himself in second place among all competitors, one back. Soon thereafter the returned to Australia. In October, Reese finished in second place in the qualifying stage of the New South Wales Open. In November, he made the cut in the Australian Open, finishing in a tie for 32nd. A few days later, Reese won the pro-am leading up to Otago Charity Classic, shooting a 63 (−9).

In 1979, Reese recorded his first high finishes in well-publicized professional events. In March, he opened well at the Western Australia PGA Championship with consecutive rounds of 72. He was in third place, three back of leader Mike Ferguson. Reese finished in solo fourth place. In the northern hemisphere summer Reese again played mini-tours in North America. In July, he played the two-round Quebec Open. He opened with a 66 (−6) to lead the professionals. In the final round Reese had a 25-foot putt to force a playoff with Daniel Talbot. Reese missed, finishing joint second with Bob Beauchemin at 138 (−6). Late in the year he returned to the Australasian region. In September, he played the 54-hole Pago Pago tournament in American Samoa. Reese shot three consecutive rounds in the 60s to win it in a "runaway." In October, he shot a second round 68 to move in the top ten at the Queensland Open. Reese finished in a tie for fifth. The following week he finished in a tie for eighth at the Garden State PGA Championship.

In February 1980, Reese played the Hawaiian Open on the PGA Tour. He earned entry because he won the Pago Pago tournament in American Samoa the previous year. Reese finished T-48. He also played the next two PGA Tour stops, in Tucson and Los Angeles. He made the cut in Tucson and missed the cut in Los Angeles. This would be the only time in his career he would play on the PGA Tour.

In the early 1980s, Reese would have much success in the Australasian region. In August 1980, he again played well at the Fiji Open, opening with rounds of 69 and 70, to take a two-stroke lead. Reese shot a third round 69 (−3) to take a four-stroke lead over Bill Dunk. He would go on to win the event. In September, Reese seriously contended at the New South Wales PGA Championship, just one shot back, in joint third, after the third round. In March 1981, he played well at the Australian Masters and was in the top ten after the third round. He would go on to finish in a tie for ninth at 301 (+9). In August, he nearly successfully defended his Fiji Open title, losing a "dramatic" playoff to compatriot Alex Bonnington.

In December 1982, Reese had much success at the New Zealand PGA Championship. He held the solo lead after the second round at 133 (−11). Early in the third round Reese moved to −13, increasing his lead. However, the "tenacious" Simon Owen tied him after a birdie on the 16th. They remained tied at the end of the round at 204 (−12), one ahead of Jack Newton. Reese struggled early in the "wind-wrecked" third round, triple-bogeying the 6th hole. However, he recovered well to maintain the lead. Owen, again one of his playing partners, hit his drive out of bounds on the 10th hole to fall out of contention. Newton, also a playing partner, was the only serious competitor remaining, but Reese "held off his strong challenge" to win by one.

In 1983, Reese would record a number of highlights. In February he closed excellently at the Australian Masters, finishing with a 67 (−6) to finish in a tie for third. In August, Reese won the Fiji Open again. In October, he opened with a 69 (−3) at the Resch's Pilsner Tweed Classic to put himself in a tie for fifth place, three back. Reese would ultimately finish in a tie for fifth. The following month, he opened with a 69 at the Victorian PGA Championship to put himself in a tie for third. In November, Reese seriously contended for the New Zealand Open. He was in a tie for fourth, just a few shots back of Ian Baker-Finch, entering the final round. Reese ultimately finished at 283 (+3), three back, good enough for solo second at the "demanding" Middlemore course. In December, he again played well in his home country, shooting a second round 66 (−4) at the Air New Zealand Shell Open, to move into the top ten. Reese was unable to seriously contend in the following round (which was also the final round), however, finishing outside of the top three. The following week, Reese represented New Zealand at the 1983 World Cup, held at Pondok Indah Golf & Country Club in Jakarta, Indonesia. He was teammates with Dennis Clark. The team did not have a distinguished effort, finishing in a tie for 23rd among the 31 teams that finished.

In 1984, Reese played on the European Tour for the first time in seven years. He made the cut in all six of his events, recording three top-25s, his best finish being a tie for 13th at the French Open. It was noted that he had an "impressive" 71.17 stroke average that season.

In April 1985, he was chosen to represent New Zealand in its attempt to qualify for the Dunhill Cup. The Pacific Zone qualifying rounds would be held in Hong Kong in May. Reese's teammates would be Bob Charles and Frank Nobilo. In the semifinals Reese lost his individual match to Eduardo Bagtas by two strokes but the New Zealand team "narrowly" won their overall match against the Philippines. In the finals New Zealand played Hong Kong. Reese played against Yau Sui-Ming in his match. He was one stroke down late but birdied 16th and 17th holes and ultimately won by a stroke. Reese's comeback was vital as New Zealand barely defeated Hong Kong, winning 2–1. With the win they earned a spot in the Dunhill Cup in St Andrews Golf Club in Scotland.

Later in the year, Reese played in Europe for the third time. He played in 12 events, making the cut in nine, recording his first top ten in Europe, a tie for eighth at the Glasgow Open. His putting was excellent over the course of the season, recording 29.30 putts per round, to finish in fourth place for that year. He finished 82nd on the Order of Merit.

Late in the year, Reese played in two team events representing New Zealand. In October, he represented New Zealand at the 1985 Dunhill Cup at St. Andrews, the event New Zealand successfully qualified for in May. In the opening round, New Zealand played Canada. Reese lost to Dan Halldorson, 72−77 in his opening round match, but New Zealand won overall 2–1. In the next round, the quarterfinals, Reese lost his individual match to Raymond Floyd, 69 to 72, and the New Zealand team was eliminated, losing 3–0 to the Americans. The following month, in November, Reese represented New Zealand at the 1985 World Cup. In the first round, Reese shot an 75 and, with teammate Greg Turner's 73, they were quickly 11 shots behind the leading team of England. Reese ultimately finished at 303, in solo 43rd among 62 players. The New Zealand team finished in a tie for 15th among 31 teams.

In early 1986, Reese played the Zimbabwe Open, an event on the Safari Circuit, an offseason tour held in Africa for European Tour pros. After three rounds Reese held the solo lead at 207 (−9). On the par-4 7th hole of the final round Reese holed his approach shot to help maintain the lead. However, competitor Stephen Bennett got with one when he birdied the 10th hole. Reese bogeyed the 12th and 15th holes to lose the lead. Both birdied the 16th but Reese bogeyed the par-3 17th to fall two behind. There was a notable rain delay on the 18th with severe thunderstorms. However "it eased for a bit" and the last pair was able to finish. Both men made pars on the last hole and Bennett defeated Reese by two.

In May, he returned the Australasian region for the Pacific Zone qualifying section of the Dunhill Cup. The event was held at Bukit Golf Course in Singapore. In the first round New Zealand played the Philippines. Reese played Mario Siodina in his match. Reese defeated Siodina 72 to 75 and New Zealand won 2–1. In the finals they played Taiwan. Reese played Kuo Chie-Hsiung in his match. Reese had the lead for most of the round but three-putted the 16th for bogey. He fell into a tie. However, Reese birdied the 17th to regain the lead. On the last hole, as Chie-Hsiung made a tap-in birdie to reach to temporarily tie. However, Reese holed a "nerve-wracking" eight-foot birdie putt to win by a stroke. Overall, New Zealand won 2 1/2 − 1/2 over Taiwan to win the qualifying tournament and earn entry into the 1986 Dunhill Cup.

Later in the month, Reese returned to play in Europe. Overall in 1985, Reese played in 15 events, only making the cut in three and failing to record any top-25s.

In August 1987 Reese played two events in Fiji. In the first round of the Fiji Open shot an opening round 70 (−2) to tie the lead with Perry Somers and Ian Stanley. In the second round he shot a 71, now in second, two behind leader Stanley. After the third round he remained close, now behind Brett Officer. However, the combination of "gusty winds and tricky pin placements" sent "scores soaring." Reese shot an 80 (+8) to finish well behind. The following week he played the Fijian Hotel Pro-am. Played at the nine-hole, par-31 Coral Coast Golf Course, Reese finished the 54-hole tournament tied with Perry Somers and Ian Stanley at 179 (−7). In a "dramatic" sudden-death playoff, Somers won after three holes.

In November, he had success in a number of events in Malaysia. In the middle of the month he played the Maruman Golf Classic in Kuala Lumpur. In difficult conditions, Reese's 303 (+15) was good enough for a tie for fourth with Santi Sopon of Thailand and Eleuterio Nival of the Philippines. The top four finishers also received entry into the following year's Maruman Open in Japan. Reese entered a playoff with Sopon and Nival to see who would be allocated the final spot. Nival won the sudden-death playoff after seven holes. The following week he played the Malaysian PGA Championship. He was considered the "favorite" by the Business Times entering the tournament but "could make no impression" with opening rounds of 77 and 75. The following day, however, he shot a 72, the round of the day, to move into a tie for fourth. The following week he played the Perak Masters. In the second round, Reese shot a one-under-par 71 to move into contention. However, he followed with a third round 77 (+5) to fall out of contention. In the final round, he came back with an even-par round to finish in a tie for fourth, one back of second.

Reese did not play much after the late 1980s. In 1991 he played his final European Tour event. In November 1992 he played the New Zealand Open. It was the last official regular event of his career. Reese stated later in life that he quit because he lost confidence in his swing. "I couldn’t even hit balls in front of my members, I was just too embarrassed," he stated later in life. He did not play tournament golf for 16 years.

Shortly thereafter Reese moved to Sweden to coach. During this era he also worked in California with a young Tiger Woods. In 1998, Reese started working as the head professional for Peninsula Golf Club.

=== Senior career ===
As a senior, Reese has had some success. In November 2006, he finished solo runner-up at the Australian PGA Seniors Championship. In October 2008, Reese played the inaugural Greater Building Society Australian Masters Invitational. The event was held at Emerald Lakes Golf Club. He opened with a "stunning" 66 to take the lead. Reese had a bogey-free round with six birdies. He held a three shot lead over several players. In the final round, Reese played in the final group with Mike Ferguson. Ferguson made several early birdies but Reese "matched strides" with him to maintain the lead. However, Reese made several bogeys in the middle of the back nine to assure Ferguson's victory. Reese finished in a tie for second with Ian Baker-Finch, two back. A month later, he played the three-round Polygiene Australian PGA Seniors Championship again. The event was held at Byron Bay Golf Club. Reese was in contention, three back of the lead entering the final round. However, playing against "strong westerly winds," he only managed a three-over-par 75 the final day. Reese finished a four-way tie for runner-up, six back.

In 2015, Reese was still working at Peninsula Golf Club. He has helped the game of LPGA star Lydia Ko who practices at Peninsula Club.

== Amateur wins ==
- 1975 New Zealand Amateur

== Professional wins (4) ==
=== PGA Tour of Australasia wins (1) ===
No.	Date	Tournament	Winning score	Margin of victory	Runner-up
1	12 Dec 1982	New Zealand PGA Championship	−11 (70-63-71-73=277)	1 stroke	(Australia) Jack Newton

=== Other wins (3) ===
- 1979 Pago Pago tournament
- 1980 Fiji Open
- 1983 Fiji Open

== Team appearances ==
Amateur

- Commonwealth Tournament (representing New Zealand): 1975

Professional

- World Cup (representing New Zealand): 1983, 1985
- Alfred Dunhill Cup (representing New Zealand): 1985
