= Géry Watine =

French professional golfer (born 1953)

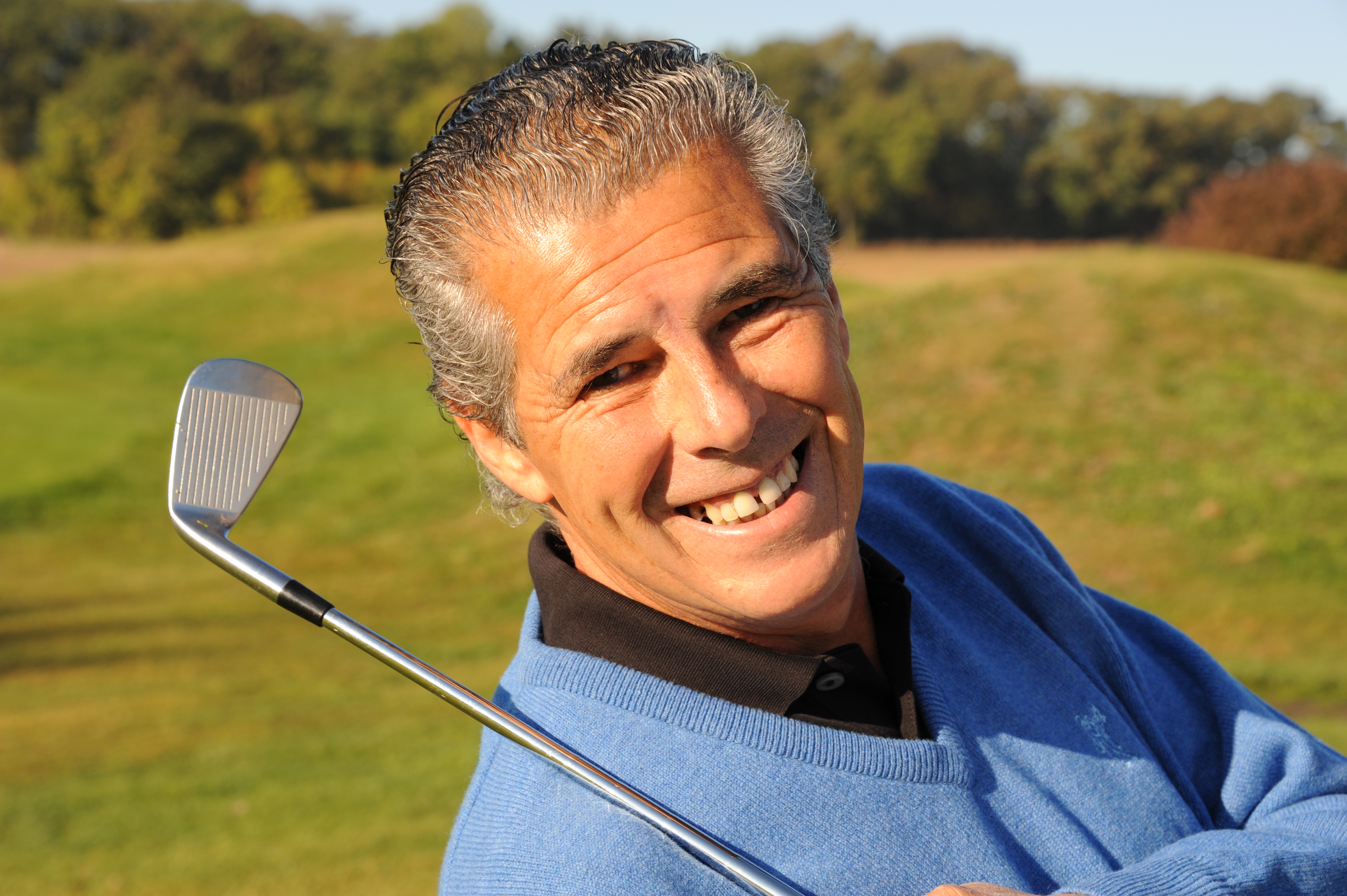

Personal information
- Nationality: France
- Born: 8 August 1953 (age 73) Rabat, Morocco
- Height: 180 cm (5 ft 11 in)

Career
- Sport: Golf
- Turned professional: 1975
- Former tours: European Senior Tour; European Tour; Challenge Tour
- Professional wins: 8

Number of wins by tour
- Challenge Tour: 1
- European Senior Tour: 1
- Other: 6

Géry Watine (born 8 August 1953) is a French professional golfer who is a former member of the European Tour.

== Career ==
Watine was born and raised in Morocco and moved to France at 18, where he won 25 titles and was ranked the country's top player in 1981, 1982, 1987 and 1988.

Watine turned professional in 1975. He made 73 starts on the European Tour between 1978 and 1993, and made 40 cuts. His best finish was a tie for 6th in the 1982 Trophée Lancôme at Saint-Nom-la-Bretèche, where he was only beaten by David Graham, Seve Ballesteros, Craig Stadler, Sandy Lyle and Arnold Palmer.

He played briefly on the Challenge Tour where he was runner-up at the 1990 Open Vittel and the 1991 Open de Lyon, before winning two events in his home country in 1992. In 1993, he was runner-up at the Championnat de France Pro, a stroke behind compatriot Christian Cévaër.

== Senior career ==
Watine had a successful senior career and played on the European Senior Tour between 2003 and 2010. He made his winning breakthrough in 2005 at the Italian Seniors Open, prevailing against Ireland's Eamonn Darcy at the first hole of a sudden-death playoff. He was runner-up at the Swiss Seniors Open, two strokes behind Terry Gale. He was also 4th at the Castellon Costa Azahar Open de España two strokes behind winner Bob Boyd, and finished 15th in the Order of Merit.

In 2006, he was runner-up at the Wales Seniors Open, a stroke behind José Rivero.

== Coaching and design ==
Watine coached the Moroccan squad from 1993 to 1996, and the French team between September 1997 and December 2001, helping to secure the 2000 Espirito Santo Trophy and three gold medals at the 1999 Mediterranean Games.

He has also established himself as a golf course architect, and has designed 15 courses in France.

== Amateur wins ==
- 1975 Austrian Amateur Open Championship

== Professional wins (8) ==
=== Challenge Tour wins (1) ===
No.	Date	Tournament	Winning score	Margin of victory	Runners-up
1	17 May 1992	Pro 2000 - Challenge Chargeurs	−10 (74-68-68-68=278)	3 strokes	(France) Marc Pendariès, (United States) Charles Raulerson

=== European Seniors Tour wins (1) ===
No.	Date	Tournament	Winning score	Margin of victory	Runner-up
1	22 May 2005	Nokia 9300 Italian Seniors Open	−11 (67-70-68=205)	Playoff	(Republic of Ireland) Eamonn Darcy

European Seniors Tour playoff record (1–0)

No.	Year	Tournament	Opponent	Result
1	2005	Nokia 9300 Italian Seniors Open	(Republic of Ireland) Eamonn Darcy	Won with birdie on first extra hole

=== Other wins (6) ===
- 1980 Timex Open
- 1981 Timex Open, Cannes Open
- 1987 Grand Prix PGA France
- 1989 Grand Prix PGA France
- 1992 Bulles Laurent Perrier

== Team appearances ==
Professional

- Alfred Dunhill Cup (representing France): 1985, 1987, 1989
- World Cup (representing France): 1982, 1983, 1984
- Hennessy Cognac Cup (representing France): 1984
- Europcar Cup (representing France): 1988
