= Howard Clark (golfer) =

English professional golfer

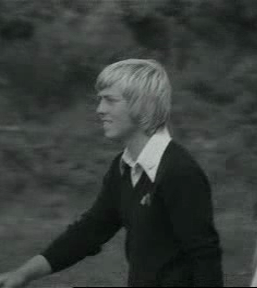
- Clark in 1976

Personal information
- Full name: Howard Keith Clark
- Nationality: England
- Born: 26 August 1954 (age 72) Leeds, England
- Height: 6 ft 1 in (1.85 m)
- Weight: 185 lb (84 kg; 13.2 st)

Career
- Sport: Golf
- Turned professional: 1973
- Former tour: European Tour
- Professional wins: 14

Number of wins by tour
- European Tour: 11
- Other: 3

Best results in major championships
- Masters Tournament: T35: 1987
- PGA Championship: T80: 1996
- U.S. Open: CUT: 1992
- The Open Championship: T8: 1981

Howard Keith Clark (born 26 August 1954) is an English professional golfer who played on the European Tour for many years and had his most successful period in the mid-1980s.

== Early life and amateur career ==
Clark was born in Leeds, England. He learned the game from his father, who was a scratch amateur. He won the 1971 Boys Amateur Championship and played for Great Britain & Ireland in the 1973 Walker Cup.

== Professional career ==
Clark turned professional in 1973 and joined the European Tour in 1974. His first professional tournament win came in the 1975 Greater Manchester Open. In 1976 he won the T.P.D. Under-25 Championship and his first win on the European Tour was two years later at the 1978 Portuguese Open. Clark's final tally of European Tour wins was eleven, including pairs of wins in four consecutive seasons from 1984 to 1987. He also won the individual title at the World Cup of Golf in 1985. His best placing on the Order of Merit was third, which he achieved in both 1984 and 1986. His form fell away in the early 1990s but revived for a time in the middle of that decade, and he made the top twenty on the Order of Merit in 1994 and 1995. His last season on the tour was 1999 and he subsequently worked as an on-course commentator for BBC Sport before moving to Sky Sports.

Clark played in the Ryder Cup six times and was on three winning European teams and also the 1989 team which tied the match and retained the Cup.

== Amateur wins ==
- 1971 Boys Amateur Championship

== Professional wins (14) ==
=== European Tour wins (11) ===
No.	Date	Tournament	Winning score	Margin of victory	Runner(s)-up
1	15 Apr 1978	Portuguese Open	−1 (71-75-71-74=291)	1 stroke	(Scotland) Brian Barnes, (South Africa) Simon Hobday
2	29 Apr 1978	Madrid Open	−6 (70-70-72-70=282)	2 strokes	(Spain) José María Cañizares
3	29 Apr 1984	Cepsa Madrid Open (2)	−14 (66-68-69-71=274)	3 strokes	(Spain) José María Cañizares
4	28 May 1984	Whyte & Mackay PGA Championship	−12 (64-69-71=204) (Note: Shortened to 54 holes due to weather.)	2 strokes	(England) Gordon J. Brand, (West Germany) Bernhard Langer
5	16 Jun 1985	Jersey Open	−1 (71-69-71-68=279)	1 stroke	(England) Warren Humphreys, (Wales) Philip Parkin, (Wales) Ian Woosnam
6	11 Aug 1985	Glasgow Open	−6 (71-65-70-68=274)	Playoff	(Scotland) Sandy Lyle
7	27 Apr 1986	Cepsa Madrid Open (3)	−14 (70-68-67-69=274)	1 stroke	(Spain) Seve Ballesteros
8	18 May 1986	Peugeot Spanish Open	−16 (68-71-66-67=272)	1 stroke	(Australia) Ian Baker-Finch
9	22 Mar 1987	Moroccan Open	−8 (73-73-66-72=284)	3 strokes	(England) Mark James
10	9 Aug 1987	PLM Open	−17 (68-73-67-63=271)	2 strokes	(Australia) Ossie Moore
11	2 Oct 1988	English Open	−9 (72-71-67-69=279)	3 strokes	(England) Peter Baker

European Tour playoff record (1–1)

No.	Year	Tournament	Opponent(s)	Result
1	1985	Glasgow Open	(Scotland) Sandy Lyle	Won with birdie on second extra hole
2	1995	Murphy's Irish Open	(England) Stuart Cage, (Scotland) Sam Torrance	Torrance won with eagle on second extra hole Cage eliminated by par on first hole

=== Other wins (3) ===
- 1975 Greater Manchester Open
- 1976 T.P.D. Under-25 Championship
- 1985 World Cup (individual title)

== Results in major championships ==
Tournament	1972	1973	1974	1975	1976	1977	1978	1979
Masters Tournament								
U.S. Open								
The Open Championship	CUT				CUT	T13	T44	CUT
PGA Championship								

Tournament	1980	1981	1982	1983	1984	1985	1986	1987	1988	1989
Masters Tournament								T35		
U.S. Open										
The Open Championship	T32	T8	CUT	T26	T52	T47	CUT	T62	T28	T13
PGA Championship							CUT			

Tournament	1990	1991	1992	1993	1994	1995	1996	1997	1998
Masters Tournament									
U.S. Open			CUT						
The Open Championship	CUT	T80	CUT	T21	CUT	CUT	70		CUT
PGA Championship							T80		

Top 10
Did not play

CUT = missed the half-way cut
"T" indicates a tie for a place

=== Summary ===
Tournament	Wins	2nd	3rd	Top-5	Top-10	Top-25	Events	Cuts made
Masters Tournament	0	0	0	0	0	0	1	1
U.S. Open	0	0	0	0	0	0	1	0
The Open Championship	0	0	0	0	1	4	23	13
PGA Championship	0	0	0	0	0	0	2	1
Totals	0	0	0	0	1	4	27	15

- Most consecutive cuts made – 4 (1987 Masters – 1989 Open Championship)
- Longest streak of top-10s – 1

== Team appearances ==
Amateur

- Walker Cup (representing Great Britain & Ireland): 1973

Professional

- Ryder Cup (representing Great Britain and Ireland/Europe): 1977, 1981, 1985 (winners), 1987 (winners), 1989 (tied, cup retained), 1995 (winners)
- Hennessy Cognac Cup (representing Great Britain and Ireland): 1978 (winners), (representing England) 1984 (winners)
- World Cup (representing England): 1978, 1984, 1985 (individual winner), 1987
- Dunhill Cup (representing England): 1985, 1986, 1987 (winners), 1989, 1990, 1994, 1995
- Nissan Cup (representing Europe): 1985, 1986

== See also ==
- List of golfers with most European Tour wins
