= Hugh Christie School =

Coordinates: 51.21365°N 0.28584°E

Hugh Christie School and Sixth Form

Location
- White Cottage Road; Tonbridge, Kent, TN10 4PU; England

Information
- Type: Foundation school
- Motto: The Place to Be
- Established: 1957
- Founder: Hugh Christie
- Local authority: Kent
- Department for Education URN: 150743 Tables
- Ofsted: Reports
- Head Teacher: Palak Shah
- Gender: Coeducational
- Age: 11 to 18
- Enrolment: 1000
- Colours: Navy and White
- Website: leighacademyhughchristie.org.uk

Hugh Christie School is a secondary school and sixth form based in Tonbridge, Kent, England. In November 2006 the school moved into a new £14 million building. The school currently has a roll of approximately 1000 students.

Hugh Christie was part of the Tonbridge School Federation, which included Long Mead Primary School and Little Foxes Children's Centre.

The Headteacher is Palak Shah.

== School history ==
The school first opened in 1957, founded by Hugh Christie, with Roy Howard as the head teacher under the name "Hugh Christie Secondary Modern." It was originally a one-building school in Norwich Avenue. Between the 1960s and 2006, it was located at two neighbouring sites, Norwich Avenue and White Cottage Road. The school's motto, taken from Acts 27:23 of the King James Bible, was "Whose I am I Serve". Deputy headteacher Daphne Whitmore received the MBE in the Queen's Birthday Honours list of 1988.

In 1994 the school was re-branded as "Hugh Christie Technology College". In March 2006, the school began an extensive rebuilding project, which was completed in September 2007, allowing the school to be located on a single site, White Cottage Road. It was re-branded to Hugh Christie School in 2018, following the loss of the technology college status. As of May 2024 Hugh Christie school now has an academy status with "The Leigh Academy" and has been renamed - Leigh Academy Hugh Christie.

== Notable former pupils ==
- Dame Kelly Holmes, Olympic athlete
- Andy Titterrell, rugby player
- Paul Way, golfer
- Isaac Holman, singer
