= Fiji Open =

Professional golf tournament

The Fiji Open is a professional golf tournament played in Fiji. It was inaugurated in 1970 as a 54-hole stroke play tournament sponsored by Air New Zealand. During the first event there were 40 players. It has been a 72-hole tournament since the second edition in 1971. In 1973, a full-field of 162 players entered the tournament. As of 1976, it was the second of five events "South Pacific circuit."

Since 2015, the winner and the leading Fijian have been rewarded with entry into the Fiji International.

== Winners ==
- 1970 Bruce Rafferty
- 1971 Frank Molloy
- 1972 Simon Owen
- 1973 Paul Shadlock
- 1974 Bob Tuohy
- 1975 Frank Phillips
- 1976 Barry Vivian
- 1977 George Serhan
- 1978 Bill Brask
- 1979 Peter Creighton (a)
- 1980 Stuart Reese
- 1981 Alex Bonnington
- 1982 Richard Coombes
- 1983 Stuart Reese
- 1984 Mike Harwood
- 1985 Greg Turner
- 1986 Ian Stanley
- 1987 Brett Officer
- 1988 Jeff Woodland
- 1989 Max Stevens
- 1990 Jason Deep
- 1991 Rob Willis
- 1992 Darren Barnes
- 1993 Jeff Wagner
- 1994 Neil Kerry
- 1995 Steven Alker
- 1996 Elliot Boult
- 1997 Tony Christie
- 1998 Mukesh Chand
- 1999 Neil Kerry
- 2000 No tournament
- 2001 Neil Kerry
- 2002 Salesh Chand
- 2003 Tony Christie
- 2004 Ryan Haywood
- 2005 Marika Batibasaga (a)
- 2006 Marika Batibasaga (a)
- 2007 Tony Christie
- 2008 Brad Shilton
- 2009 Matthew Griffin
- 2010 Michael Hendry
- 2011 Nick Gillespie
- 2012 Ryan Fox
- 2013 Ryan Fox
- 2014 Matt Ballard
- 2015 Ed Steadman
- 2016 Gareth Paddison
- 2017 Kieran Muir
- 2018 Sam Lee
- 2019 Sam Lee

Source (1970–2008):
