= 1985 Ryder Cup =

26th edition; golf tournament in England

26th Ryder Cup Matches
- Dates: 13–15 September 1985
- Venue: The Belfry, Brabazon Course
- Location: Wishaw, Warwickshire, England
- Captains: Tony Jacklin (Europe); Lee Trevino (USA)
(Europe)	16 1/2	11 1/2	(United States)
- Europe wins the Ryder Cup

Location map
- Location within England

The 26th Ryder Cup Matches were held 13–15 September 1985 at the Brabazon Course of The Belfry in Wishaw, Warwickshire, England. Team Europe won the competition for the first time by a score of 16 1/2 to 11 1/2 points. This marked the first U.S. loss since 1957, previously the sole U.S. loss in fifty years.

A key turning point in the matches came Saturday morning, when Craig Stadler missed a two-foot putt on the 18th hole, which would have earned a win for him and Curtis Strange over Europe's Bernhard Langer and Sandy Lyle. The match was halved, so instead of the U.S. being in the lead through three stages, the overall score was tied at 6-6. Europe went on to win three of the four Saturday afternoon matches. "In the past, it was always us who missed those putts," said European captain Tony Jacklin. "That has to crush them."

Europe took that two-point lead into the Sunday singles and increased their lead throughout Sunday. It fell to Sam Torrance to secure the winning margin when he holed a 22-foot (7 m) putt on the 18th hole to defeat Andy North 1 up and go up 14 1/2 to 8 1/2, a six-point margin with five matches on the course.

This was the last Ryder Cup played in Europe that was not shown on live television in the United States. The USA Network first televised it in 1989 on cable with video provided by the BBC. NBC Sports took over live weekend coverage in 1991 in South Carolina, and 1993 marked the first time a major U.S. network televised it live from Europe.

== Format ==
The Ryder Cup is a match play event, with each match worth one point. The competition format in 1985 was as follows:

- Day 1 — 4 foursome (alternate shot) matches in a morning session and 4 four-ball (better ball) matches in an afternoon session
- Day 2 — 4 four-ball matches in a morning session and 4 foursome matches in an afternoon session
- Day 3 — 12 singles matches

With a total of 28 points, 14 1/2 points were required to win the Cup. All matches were played to a maximum of 18 holes.

== Teams ==
Nine of the European team were chosen from the 1985 European Tour money list at the conclusion of the Benson & Hedges International Open on 18 August with the remaining three team members being chosen immediately after the final event by the team captain, Tony Jacklin. Prior to the final event Christy O'Connor Jnr was in the 9th qualifying position. However he missed the cut in the Benson & Hedges International Open and was overtaken by José María Cañizares, O'Connor finishing just £115.89 behind Cañizares. Jacklin's choices of Nick Faldo and Ken Brown were widely expected but his choice of José Rivero was a surprise.

Team Europe
Name	Age	Points rank	Previous Ryder Cups	Matches	W–L–H	Winning percentage
(England) Tony Jacklin	41	Non-playing captain
(Scotland) Sandy Lyle	27	1	3	11	3–7–1	31.82
(Scotland) Sam Torrance	32	2	2	9	1–5–3	27.78
(Wales) Ian Woosnam	27	3	1	3	0–2–1	16.67
(West Germany) Bernhard Langer	28	4	2	9	5–3–1	61.11
(England) Paul Way	22	5	1	5	3–1–1	70.00
(England) Howard Clark	31	6	2	3	1–1–1	50.00
(Spain) Seve Ballesteros	28	7	2	10	3–5–2	40.00
(Spain) Manuel Piñero	33	8	1	4	2–2–0	50.00
(Spain) José María Cañizares	38	9	2	6	2–3–1	41.67
(Spain) José Rivero	29		0	Rookie
(Scotland) Ken Brown	28		3	8	3–5–0	37.50
(England) Nick Faldo	28		4	15	11–4–0	73.33

Captains picks are shown in yellow.

Team USA
Name	Age	Points rank	Previous Ryder Cups	Matches	W–L–H	Winning percentage
Lee Trevino	45	Non-playing captain
Andy North	35	–	0	Rookie
Hubert Green	38	–	2	4	3–1–0	75.00
Curtis Strange	30	1	1	3	1–2–0	33.33
Lanny Wadkins	35	2	3	12	9–2–1	79.17
Raymond Floyd	43	3	5	19	5–11–3	34.21
Calvin Peete	42	4	1	4	2–1–1	62.50
Mark O'Meara	28	5	0	Rookie
Craig Stadler	32	6	1	3	2–1–0	66.67
Hal Sutton	27	7	0	Rookie
Peter Jacobsen	31	8	0	Rookie
Tom Kite	35	9	3	11	7–2–2	72.73
Fuzzy Zoeller	33	10	2	7	1–5–1	21.43

North qualified by virtue of winning the 1985 U.S. Open, while Green qualified by winning the 1985 PGA Championship.

== Friday's matches ==
=== Morning foursomes ===
	Results
Ballesteros/Piñero	(Europe) 2 & 1	Strange/O'Meara
Langer/Faldo	(United States) 3 & 2	Peete/Kite
Lyle/Brown	(United States) 4 & 3	Wadkins/Floyd
Clark/Torrance	(United States) 3 & 2	Stadler/Sutton
1	Session	3
1	Overall	3

=== Afternoon four-ball ===
	Results
Way/Woosnam	(Europe) 1 up	Zoeller/Green
Ballesteros/Piñero	(Europe) 2 & 1	North/Jacobsen
Langer/Cañizares	halved	Stadler/Sutton
Torrance/Clark	(United States) 1 up	Floyd/Wadkins
2 1/2	Session	1 1/2
3 1/2	Overall	4 1/2

== Saturday's matches ==
=== Morning four-ball ===
	Results
Torrance/Clark	(Europe) 2 & 1	Kite/North
Way/Woosnam	(Europe) 4 & 3	Green/Zoeller
Ballesteros/Piñero	(United States) 3 & 2	O'Meara/Wadkins
Langer/Lyle	halved	Stadler/Strange
2 1/2	Session	1 1/2
6	Overall	6

=== Afternoon foursomes ===
	Results
Cañizares/Rivero	(Europe) 7 & 5	Kite/Peete
Ballesteros/Piñero	(Europe) 5 & 4	Stadler/Sutton
Way/Woosnam	(United States) 4 & 2	Strange/Jacobsen
Langer/Brown	(Europe) 3 & 2	Floyd/Wadkins
3	Session	1
9	Overall	7

== Sunday's singles matches ==
	Results
Manuel Piñero	(Europe) 3 & 1	Lanny Wadkins
Ian Woosnam	(United States) 2 & 1	Craig Stadler
Paul Way	(Europe) 2 up	Raymond Floyd
Seve Ballesteros	halved	Tom Kite
Sandy Lyle	(Europe) 3 & 2	Peter Jacobsen
Bernhard Langer	(Europe) 5 & 4	Hal Sutton
Sam Torrance	(Europe) 1 up	Andy North
Howard Clark	(Europe) 1 up	Mark O'Meara
José Rivero	(United States) 1 up	Calvin Peete
Nick Faldo	(United States) 3 & 1	Hubert Green
José María Cañizares	(Europe) 2 up	Fuzzy Zoeller
Ken Brown	(United States) 4 & 2	Curtis Strange
7 1/2	Session	4 1/2
16 1/2	Overall	11 1/2

== Individual player records ==
Each entry refers to the win–loss–half record of the player.

=== Europe ===
Player	Points	Overall	Singles	Foursomes	Fourballs
Seve Ballesteros	3.5	3–1–1	0–0–1	2–0–0	1–1–0
Ken Brown	1	1–2–0	0–1–0	1–1–0	0–0–0
José María Cañizares	2.5	2–0–1	1–0–0	1–0–0	0–0–1
Howard Clark	2	2–2–0	1–0–0	0–1–0	1–1–0
Nick Faldo	0	0–2–0	0–1–0	0–1–0	0–0–0
Bernhard Langer	3	2–1–2	1–0–0	1–1–0	0–0–2
Sandy Lyle	1.5	1–1–1	1–0–0	0–1–0	0–0–1
Manuel Piñero	4	4–1–0	1–0–0	2–0–0	1–1–0
José Rivero	1	1–1–0	0–1–0	1–0–0	0–0–0
Sam Torrance	2	2–2–0	1–0–0	0–1–0	1–1–0
Paul Way	3	3–1–0	1–0–0	0–1–0	2–0–0
Ian Woosnam	2	2–2–0	0–1–0	0–1–0	2–0–0

=== United States ===
Player	Points	Overall	Singles	Foursomes	Fourballs
Raymond Floyd	2	2–2–0	0–1–0	1–1–0	1–0–0
Hubert Green	1	1–2–0	1–0–0	0–0–0	0–2–0
Peter Jacobsen	1	1–2–0	0–1–0	1–0–0	0–1–0
Tom Kite	1.5	1–2–1	0–0–1	1–1–0	0–1–0
Andy North	0	0–3–0	0–1–0	0–0–0	0–2–0
Mark O'Meara	1	1–2–0	0–1–0	0–1–0	1–0–0
Calvin Peete	2	2–1–0	1–0–0	1–1–0	0–0–0
Craig Stadler	3	2–1–2	1–0–0	1–1–0	0–0–2
Curtis Strange	2.5	2–1–1	1–0–0	1–1–0	0–0–1
Hal Sutton	1.5	1–2–1	0–1–0	1–1–0	0–0–1
Lanny Wadkins	3	3–2–0	0–1–0	1–1–0	2–0–0
Fuzzy Zoeller	0	0–3–0	0–1–0	0–0–0	0–2–0
