= GSI L'Equipe Open =

Golf tournament

Tournament information
- Location: Le Touquet, France
- Established: 1985
- Course: Le Touquet Golf Club
- Par: 72
- Tour: European Tour
- Format: Stroke play
- Prize fund: £75,000
- Month played: May
- Final year: 1985

Tournament record score
- Aggregate: 272 Mark James (1985)
- To par: −16 as above

Final champion
- (England) Mark James
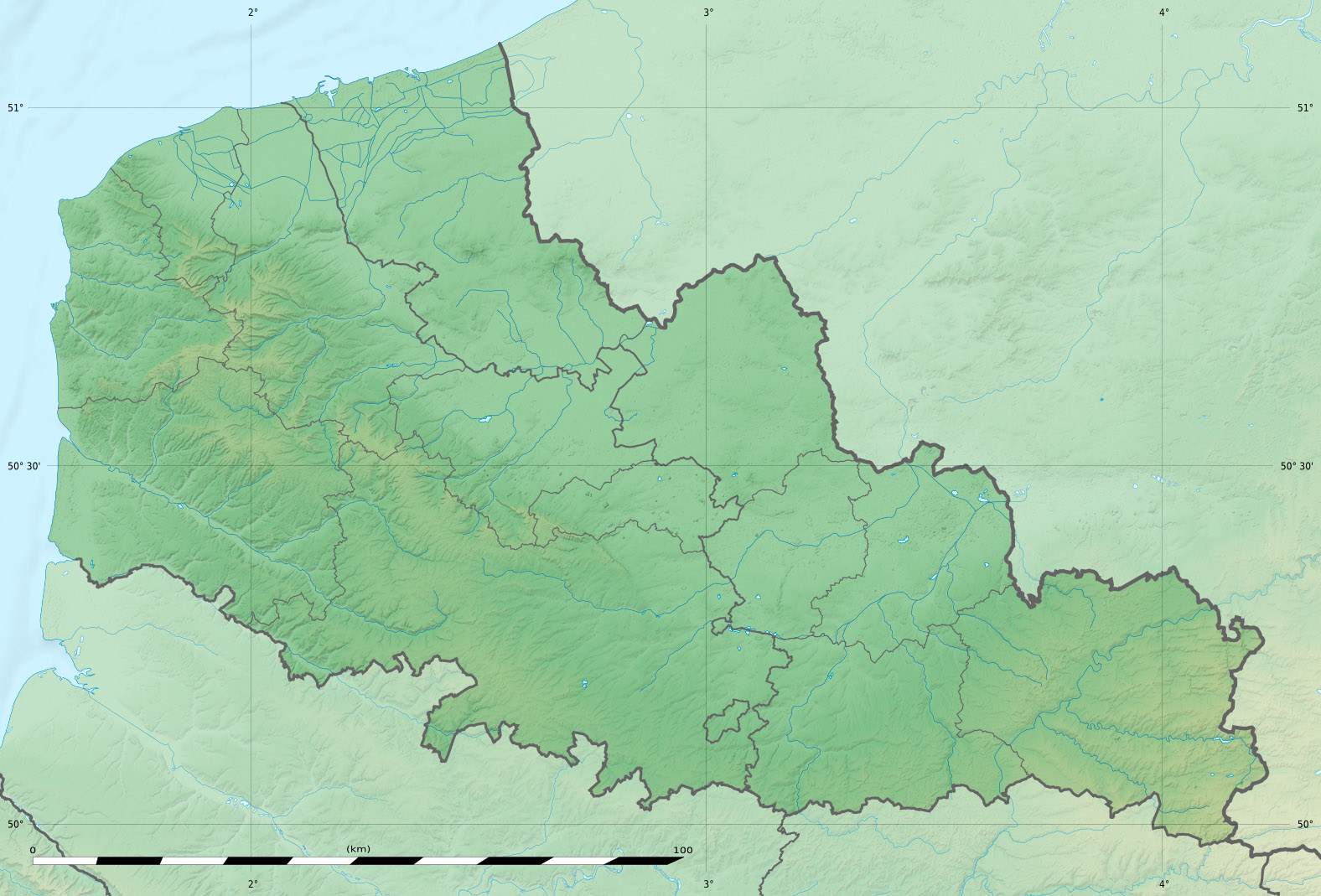
- Location in France Location in Nord-Pas-de-Calais

The GSI L'Equipe Open was a golf tournament on the European Tour in 1985. It was held at Le Touquet Golf Club in Le Touquet, France, and was won by England's Mark James.

== Winners ==
Year	Winner	Score	To par	Margin of victory	Runner-up
1985	(England) Mark James	272	−16	3 strokes	(England) Carl Mason
