= Stephen Bennett (golfer) =

English professional golfer

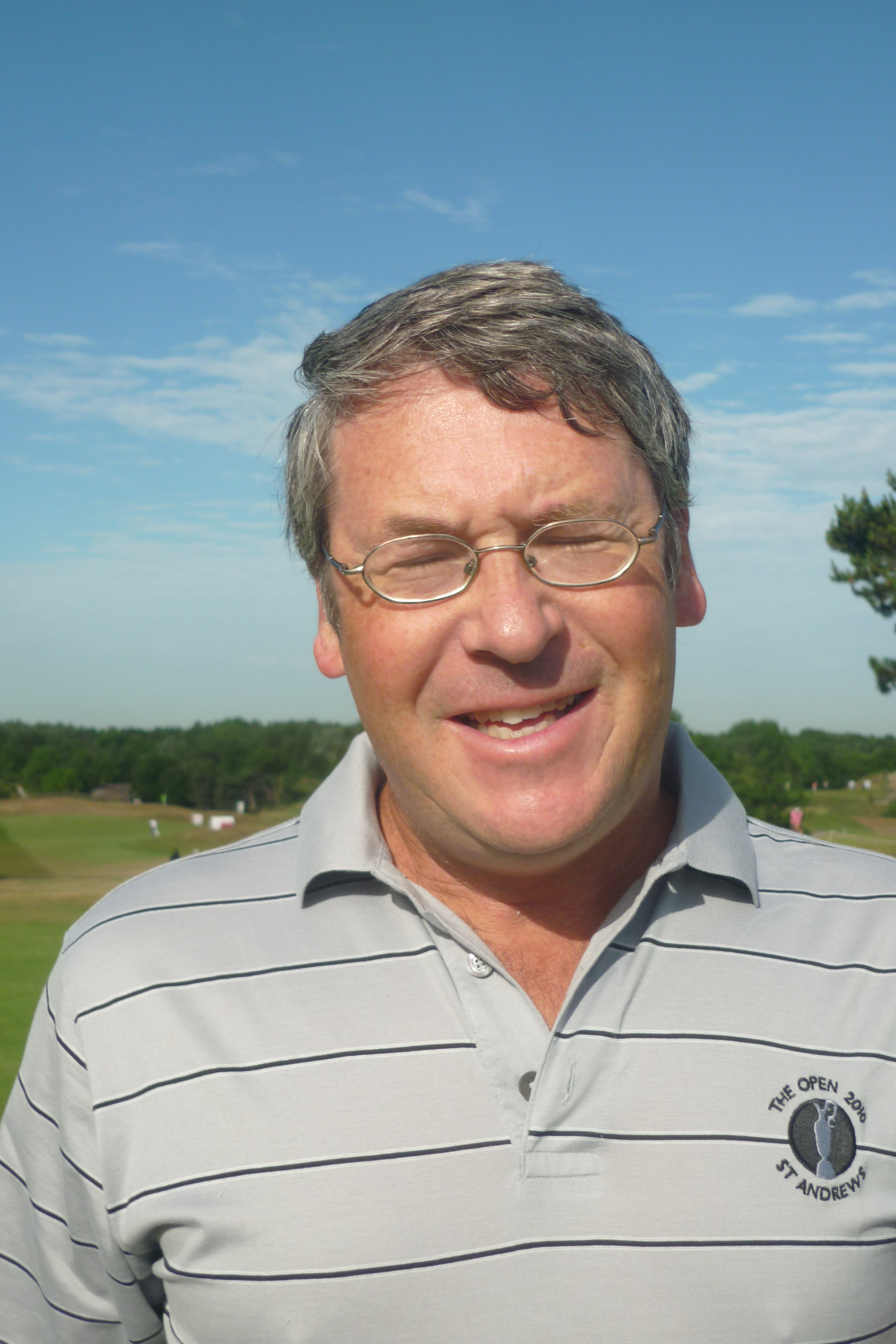

Personal information
- Nationality: England
- Born: 23 April 1959 (age 67) Cleethorpes, Lincolnshire, England
- Height: 5 ft 10 in (1.78 m)
- Weight: 173 lb (78 kg; 12.4 st)

Career
- Sport: Golf
- Turned professional: 1979
- Former tours: European Tour; Safari Circuit; European Seniors Tour
- Professional wins: 2

Number of wins by tour
- European Tour: 1
- Other: 1

Best results in major championships
- Masters Tournament: DNP
- PGA Championship: DNP
- U.S. Open: DNP
- The Open Championship: T26: 1989

Stephen Bennett (born 23 April 1959) is an English professional golfer.

== Early life and career ==
Bennett was born in Cleethorpes. He turned professional in 1979 and earned a European Tour card on his first visit to qualifying school. He played on the tour through much of the 1980s and 1990s, but didn't always manage to retain his tour card. His best season was 1985, when he finished 33rd on the Order of Merit and picked up his only European Tour win at the Tunisian Open. He also won the 1986 Zimbabwe Open.

After leaving the tour, he ran a golf academy and driving range called Swingtime in Grimsby. Bennett was coached by Eric Sharp, father in law to fellow professional Gordon J. Brand.

He is the professional at the golf club in Waltham, Lincolnshire.

== Professional wins (2) ==
=== European Tour wins (1) ===
No.	Date	Tournament	Winning score	Margin of victory	Runner-up
1	21 Apr 1985	Tunisian Open	−3 (72-70-68-75=285)	Playoff	(England) Paul Way

European Tour playoff record (1–0)

No.	Year	Tournament	Opponent	Result
1	1985	Tunisian Open	(England) Paul Way	Won with par on first extra hole

=== Safari Circuit wins (1) ===
No.	Date	Tournament	Winning score	Margin of victory	Runner-up
1	23 Mar 1986	Zimbabwe Open	−11 (68-69-71-69=277)	2 strokes	(New Zealand) Stuart Reese

== Results in major championships ==
Tournament	1985	1986	1987	1988	1989	1990	1991	1992
The Open Championship	CUT		CUT		T26	CUT		CUT

Note: Bennett only played in The Open Championship.

Did not play

CUT = missed the half-way cut
"T" = tied

== Team appearances ==
- PGA Cup (representing Great Britain and Ireland): 1998
