= Andy Titterrell =

British Lions & England international rugby union player

- Born: Andrew James Titterrell; 10 January 1981 (age 45) Dartford, Kent, England
- Height: 5 ft 8 in (1.73 m)
- Weight: 14 st 11 lb (207 lb; 94 kg) (94 Kg)
- School: Hugh Christie Technology College; Sevenoaks School

Rugby union career
- Position(s): Hooker, Flanker
Youth career
- Sevenoaks
Senior career
Years	Team	Apps	(Points)
- Saracens
- Waterloo
2001–2007	Sale Sharks	122	(35)
2007–2009	Gloucester Rugby	45	(10)
2010–2011	Leeds Carnegie	40	(5)
2011–2012	Sale Sharks (loan)	2	(0)
2012–2013	Edinburgh	20	(0)
2013–2014	London Welsh	10	(5)
International career
Years	Team	Apps	(Points)
2004–07	England	5	(0)
2005	British & Irish Lions		

Andrew James Titterrell (born 10 January 1981 in Dartford, England) is a former rugby union player who played at hooker and previously for England.

Titterrell was educated at the Hugh Christie Technology College in Tonbridge and Sevenoaks School and started playing rugby union at the age of seven at Sevenoaks which also nurtured England prop David Flatman and Sevens specialist Tony Roques.

After learning the game in Kent, he had spells with Saracens and Waterloo before joining Sale Sharks in 2001. His first game for Sale was against French club Auch in 2001. Capped by England at schoolboy and U21 level, he was first capped for England A against Ireland A in 2002. He caught the eye of Clive Woodward with a dynamic display on his first start for England A against Scotland A in March 2002. He gained his second A cap against Italy A in 2003 and was involved in the Churchill Cup success in Canada. He won a place in the England Elite Player Squad for 2003. He was considered an outside chance for Woodward's 2003 Rugby World Cup squad but was ultimately left out.

In 2004, Titterrell earned England A selection against France A in their narrow defeat in Perpignan. He took part in the 2004 senior Summer tour, earning his first senior cap, coming off the bench against the All Blacks in Auckland. He added another when coming on as a replacement against Canada in November 2004. In 2005 Titterrell was a surprise selection for the British & Irish Lions tour to New Zealand ahead of more experienced players.

In the 2005–06 Guinness Premiership, Titterrell played every game for Sale Sharks and was a key catalyst for the team's Final victory in May. Titterrell only missed 1 game during the whole season for the Sharks which was against the Llanelli Scarlets in the Powergen Cup.

On 3 April 2007, Titterrell joined Gloucester Rugby on a three-year deal.

On 12 April 2009, it was announced that Titterrell had been released by Gloucester. But subsequently in November 2009 he joined Leeds Carnegie on a three-month contract that was later renewed until the end of the season. On 14 December 2011, Titterell rejoined Sale Sharks on a loan deal from Leeds Carnegie. Following his loan deal from Sale Sharks, Andy Titterrell signed a one-year contract to join Edinburgh Rugby ahead of 2012/13 season. On 31 May 2013, after his release from Edinburgh, Titterrell signed for London Welsh ahead of the 2013/14 season. However, on 12 February 2014, Titterrell announces his retirement from rugby on medical advice.

After his retirement, Titterell joins Wasps backroom staff as their new Strength and Conditioning Coach.
