= Tunisian Open =

Tunisian Golf Open
Tournament information
- Location: Tunis, Tunisia
- Established: 1982
- Course: The Residence Golf
- Par: 72
- Length: 6,873 yards (6,285 m)
- Tours: European Tour; Alps Tour
- Format: Stroke play
- Prize fund: €47,500
- Month played: April

Tournament record score
- Aggregate: 272 Josh Loughrey (2015)
- To par: −16 as above

Current champion
- (Spain) Álvaro Hernández Cabezuela

Final champion
- Location in Tunisia

The Tunisian Open is a men's professional golf tournament which is currently played on the Alps Tour.

== History ==
The tournament was part of the European Tour's official schedule from 1982 to 1985, and was the European Tour's first venture outside Europe. The Moroccan Open was also on the Tour's schedule for a time, but since 2001 the tour has departed from North Africa to focus its international expansion on the established golf markets of Australasia and South Africa and the rapidly emerging Asian market. In 1985 the prize fund was £70,000, which was the third smallest in a European Tour official money event that season.

In 2015 and 2016, it featured on the Alps Tour's schedule. Having not been played between 2017 and 2023, the event returned on the Alps Tour in 2024.

== Winners ==
| Year | Tour (Note: ALP − Alps Tour; EUR − European Tour.) | Winner | Score | To par | Margin of victory | Runner(s)-up |
Tunisian Golf Open
| 2025 | ALP | (Spain) Álvaro Hernández Cabezuela | 131 (Note: Shortened to 36 holes due to weather.) | −13 | 2 strokes | (Italy) Jacopo Vecchi Fossa (Spain) Rocco Repetto |
| 2024 | ALP | (Italy) Gianmaria Rean Trinchero | 206 | −10 | 1 stroke | (Republic of Ireland) Alex Maguire |
2017–2023: No tournament
| 2016 | ALP | (England) Matt Wallace | 276 | −12 | 2 strokes | (Italy) Enrico Di Nitto |
| 2015 | ALP | (England) Josh Loughrey | 272 | −16 | 3 strokes | (England) Liam Harper (France) Léo Lespinasse |
Tunisian Open
1987–2014: No tournament
| 1986 | EUR | Cancelled due to lack of funding | | | | |
| 1985 | EUR | (England) Stephen Bennett | 285 | −3 | Playoff | (England) Paul Way |
| 1984 | EUR | (Scotland) Sam Torrance | 282 | −6 | 1 stroke | (England) Brian Waites |
| 1983 | EUR | (England) Mark James | 284 | −4 | 2 strokes | (Scotland) Gordon Brand Jnr (England) Gordon J. Brand (United States) Tom Sieckmann |
| 1982 | EUR | (Spain) Antonio Garrido | 286 | −2 | Playoff | (Spain) Manuel Calero |

== See also ==
- Open golf tournament
