= Hugh Christie =

Hugh Christie OBE (died 1962) was an English farmer and educator. He was a founder member of the National Farmers Union and was also involved in the formation of the Women's Institutes. Hugh Whitmore Christie was married to Nellie Christie. Their son, Murray Whitmore Christie, served in the Parachute Regiment in the Second World War and was awarded the DSO.

The school Hugh Christie Comprehensive in Tonbridge, Kent, was founded in 1957 in his name. He was awarded the OBE for political and public services in Kent.
