= Paul Way =

English golfer

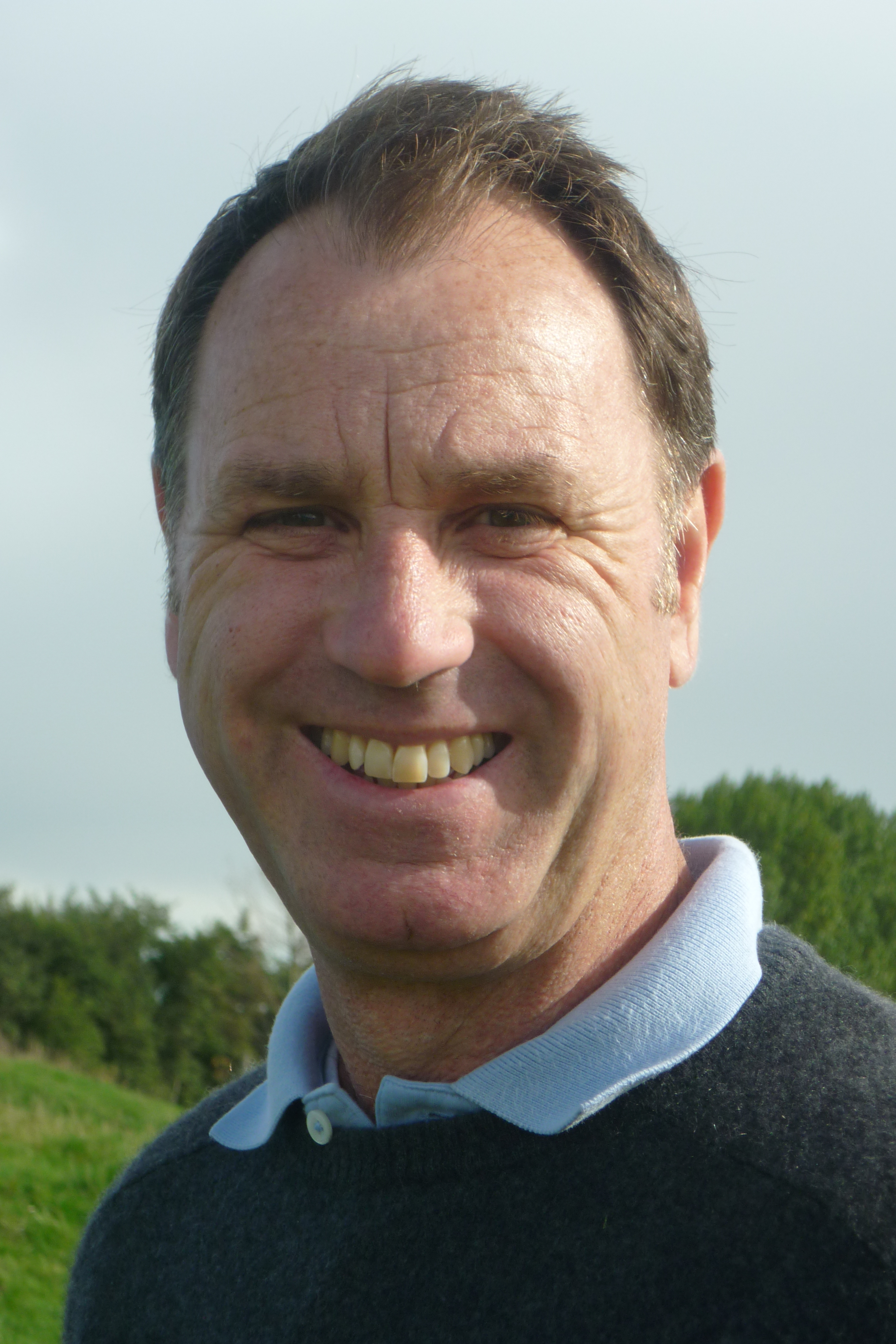
- Way at the 2013 Dutch Senior Open

Personal information
- Full name: Paul Graham Albert Way
- Nationality: England
- Born: 12 March 1963 (age 63) Kingsbury, Middlesex, England
- Height: 5 ft 8 in (1.73 m)
- Weight: 159 lb (72 kg; 11.4 st)

Career
- Sport: Golf
- Turned professional: 1981
- Current tour: European Players Tour
- Former tours: European Tour; European Senior Tour
- Professional wins: 4

Number of wins by tour
- European Tour: 3
- Sunshine Tour: 1

Best results in major championships
- Masters Tournament: DNP
- PGA Championship: CUT: 1986
- U.S. Open: DNP
- The Open Championship: T22: 1984

Paul Graham Albert Way (born 12 March 1963) is an English professional golfer.

== Early life and amateur career ==
Way was born in Kingsbury, Middlesex. He went to the Hugh Christie School in Tonbridge, Kent. He won the Brabazon Trophy in 1981.

He was presented the Captains Day Prize at age 12, by Sydney Simmons, the former Chief Surveyor of Kent, and the founder, President, Chairman and first Captain of Poult Wood Golf Club in Tonbridge, Kent.

== Professional career ==
In 1982, Way turned professional and quickly found success on the European Tour, winning that year's KLM Dutch Open.

For a few years, Way was one of Europe's most promising young golfers, and he represented Europe in the Ryder Cup in 1983, when he became the second youngest Ryder Cup player up to that time after Nick Faldo, and again in 1985, when Europe captured the trophy which had been in American hands for twenty-eight years. He had an outstanding Ryder Cup record of six wins, two losses and one halved match.

Way did not sustain his early success. His last top 100 finish on the Order of Merit was in 1993 and after 1997 he played little tournament golf. He began playing on the European Senior Tour after turning 50 in March 2013.

== Amateur wins ==
- 1981 Brabazon Trophy

== Professional wins (4) ==
=== European Tour wins (3) ===
No.	Date	Tournament	Winning score	Margin of victory	Runner(s)-up
1	8 Aug 1982	KLM Dutch Open	−12 (71-73-67-65=276)	2 strokes	(Northern Ireland) David Feherty, (Argentina) Vicente Fernández
2	27 May 1985	Whyte & Mackay PGA Championship	−6 (75-72-69-66=282)	Playoff	(Scotland) Sandy Lyle
3	13 Sep 1987	Panasonic European Open	−9 (70-71-71-67=279)	2 strokes	(South Africa) John Bland, (Scotland) Gordon Brand Jnr

European Tour playoff record (1–1)

No.	Year	Tournament	Opponent	Result
1	1985	Tunisian Open	(England) Stephen Bennett	Lost to par on first extra hole
2	1985	Whyte & Mackay PGA Championship	(Scotland) Sandy Lyle	Won with birdie on third extra hole

=== Southern Africa Tour wins (1) ===
No.	Date	Tournament	Winning score	Margin of victory	Runner-up
1	9 Feb 1985	AECI Charity Classic	−20 (68-70-67-67=272)	5 strokes	(Zimbabwe) Mark McNulty

== Results in major championships ==
Tournament	1980	1981	1982	1983	1984	1985	1986	1987	1988	1989
The Open Championship	CUT		T35	CUT	T22	CUT	CUT	CUT		
PGA Championship							CUT			

Tournament	1990	1991	1992	1993	1994
The Open Championship	CUT		CUT	CUT	CUT
PGA Championship					

Note: Way never played in the Masters Tournament nor the U.S. Open.

Did not play

CUT = missed the half-way cut (3rd round cut in 1983 and 1985 Open Championships)
"T" = tied

== Team appearances ==
Amateur

- Jacques Léglise Trophy (representing Great Britain & Ireland): 1980 (winners)
- European Amateur Team Championship (representing England): 1981 (winners)
- Walker Cup (representing Great Britain & Ireland): 1981

Professional

- Ryder Cup (representing Europe): 1983, 1985
- Dunhill Cup (representing England): 1985
- World Cup (representing England): 1985
