= Glasgow Open =

Tournament information
- Location: Glasgow, Scotland
- Established: 1983
- Course: Haggs Castle Golf Club
- Par: 70
- Tour: European Tour
- Format: Stroke play
- Prize fund: £90,000
- Month played: August
- Final year: 1985

Tournament record score
- Aggregate: 266 Ken Brown (1984)
- To par: −14 as above

Final champion
- (England) Howard Clark

Location map
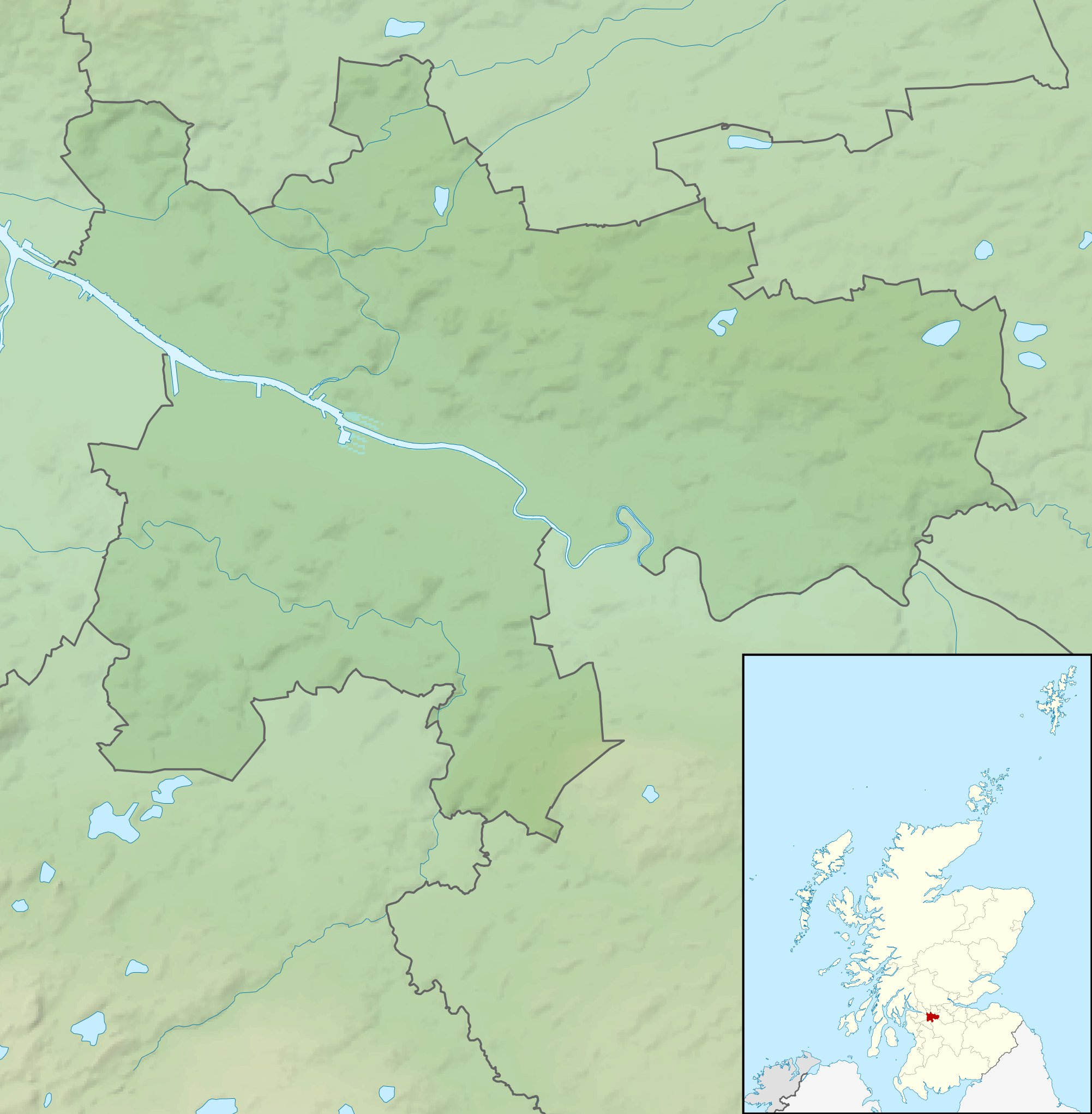
- Location in Scotland Location in Glasgow

The Glasgow Open was a European Tour golf tournament which was played annually at Haggs Castle Golf Club in Glasgow from 1983 to 1985. The most distinguished of the three winners was future World Number 1 Bernhard Langer of Germany. In 1985 the prize fund was £90,348, which was slightly below average for a European Tour event at that time.

== Winners ==
Year	Winner	Score	To par	Margin of victory	Runner-up	Winner's share (£)	Ref.
Glasgow Open
1985	(England) Howard Clark	274	−6	Playoff	(Scotland) Sandy Lyle	15,000	
1984	(Scotland) Ken Brown	266	−14	11 strokes	(Scotland) Sam Torrance	13,330	
Glasgow Golf Classic
1983	(West Germany) Bernhard Langer	274	−6	1 stroke	(Argentina) Vicente Fernández	13,330	
