= 1985 World Cup (men's golf) =

Coordinates: 33.6884°N 116.3107°W

Tournament information
- Dates: November 21–24
- Location: La Quinta, California, U.S.
- Courses: La Quinta Resort & Club; Mountain course
- Format: 72 holes stroke play combined score

Statistics
- Par: 72
- Length: 6,794 yards (6,212 m)
- Field: 31 two-man teams
- Cut: None
- Prize fund: $743,000
- Winner's share: $200,000 team $25,000 individual

Champion
- Canada; Dave Barr & Dan Halldorson
- 559 (−17)

The 1985 World Cup took place at the La Quinta Resort & Club in La Quinta, California, United States. It was the 32nd World Cup event. The tournament was a 72-hole stroke play team event with 31 teams, of which 15 teams were directly qualified through last years tournament. Each team consisted of two players from a country. The combined score of each team determined the team results. The Canada team of Dave Barr and Dan Halldorson won by four strokes over the England team of Howard Clark and Paul Way. The individual competition for The International Trophy, was won by Howard Clark five strokes ahead of Christy O'Connor Jnr, Ireland.

== Teams ==
Country	Players
Argentina	Vicente Fernández and Adan Sowa
Australia	Ian Baker-Finch and Rodger Davis
Belgium	Vincent Duysters and Andre Vandamme
Brazil	Priscillo Diniz and Frederico German
Canada	Dave Barr and Dan Halldorson
Chile	Francisco Cerda and Luis Torres
Colombia	Rigoberto Velásquez and Liberio Zapata Guererro
England	Howard Clark and Paul Way
France	Bernard Pascassio and Michel Tapia
Greece	Vassilis Anastasiou and Vassilis Kradjas
Hong Kong	Alex Tang and Yau Sui Ming
Ireland	Eamonn Darcy and Christy O'Connor Jnr
Italy	Giuseppe Calì and Gerolamo Delfino
Japan	Naomichi Ozaki and Tateo Ozaki
Mexico	Juan Brito and Sixto Torres
Netherlands	Wilfred Lemmens and Bertus van Mook
New Zealand	Stuart Reese and Greg Turner
Paraguay	Ángel Franco and Eladio Franco
Philippines	Mario Manubay and Mario Siodina
Scotland	Gordon Brand Jnr and Sam Torrance
Singapore	Lim Kian Toin and Poh Eng Soon
South Korea	Choi Sang-ho and Park Shi-hwan
Spain	José María Cañizares and Manuel Piñero
Sweden	Anders Forsbrand and Ove Sellberg
Switzerland	Patrick Bagnoud and Franco Salmina
Thailand	Amnart Kerdkasin and Sukree Onsham
United States	Tom Kite and Lanny Wadkins
Uruguay	Alvaro Canessa and Guzman Etchurry (a)
Venezuela	Ramón Muñoz and Julian Santana
Wales	David Llewellyn and Ian Woosnam
West Germany	Torsten Giedeon and Manfred Kessler

== Scores ==
Team

Place	Country	Score	To par	Money (US$) (per team)
1	Canada	138-135-140-146=559	−17	200,000
2	England	137-142-141-143=563	−13	100,000
3	United States	138-144-136-146=564	−12	70,000
4	Wales	147-140-140-140=567	−9	60,000
5	Japan	144-146-134-147=571	−5	36,000
6	Argentina	144-142-140-146=572	−4	30,000
T7	Ireland	145-142-144-143=574	−2	12,500
T7	Spain	143-142-142-147=574	−2	12,500
9	Sweden	146-152-137-143=578	+2	8,000
10	Australia	144-141-151-143=579	+3	6,000
T11	Italy	146-140-147-149=582	+6	4,000
T11	Scotland	146-147-145-144=582	+6	4,000
13	Philippines	149-143-150-148=590	+14	4,000
14	Colombia	151-148-146-149=594	+18	4,000
T15	Brazil	150-146-145-154=595	+19	4,000
T15	France	152-150-146-147=595	+19	4,000
T15	Mexico	148-149-145-153=595	+19	4,000
T15	New Zealand	148-151-144-152=595	+19	4,000
19	South Korea	150-145-151-153=599	+23	4,000
20	Thailand	148-150-152-154=604	+28	4,000
21	Uruguay	157-147-148-154=606	+30	4,000
22	West Germany	156-149-149-154=608	+32	4,000
23	Hong Kong	155-151-159-147=612	+36	4,000
24	Chile	157-151-152-156=616	+40	4,000
25	Venezuela	145-158-157-157=617	+41	4,000
26	Singapore	151-160-161-152=624	+48	4,000
27	Paraguay	158-148-156-163=625	+49	4,000
28	Switzerland	154-161-154-159=628	+52	4,000
29	Greece	161-164-154-152=631	+55	4,000
30	Netherlands	158-162-158-159=637	+61	4,000
31	Belgium	158-167-159-157=641	+65	4,000

International Trophy

Place	Player	Country	Score	To par	Money (US$)
1	Howard Clark	England	69-67-66-70=272	−16	25,000
2	Christy O'Connor Jnr	Ireland	77-67-67-66=277	−11	
3	Dan Halldorson	Canada	68-66-70-74=278	−10	
4	Ian Woosnam	Wales	74-69-67-70=280	−8	
T5	Dave Barr	Canada	70-69-70-72=281	−7	
T5	Tateo Ozaki	Japan	70-73-67-71=281	−7	
T5	Lanny Wadkins	United States	68-70-70-73=281	−7	
T8	Tom Kite	United States	70-74-76-73=283	−5	
T8	Adan Sowa	Argentina	73-72-67-71=283	−5	
T10	Anders Forsbrand	Sweden	68-77-70-70=285	−3	
T10	Sam Torrance	Scotland	74-71-70-70=285	−3	
