= Manuel Piñero =

Spanish golfer (born 1952)

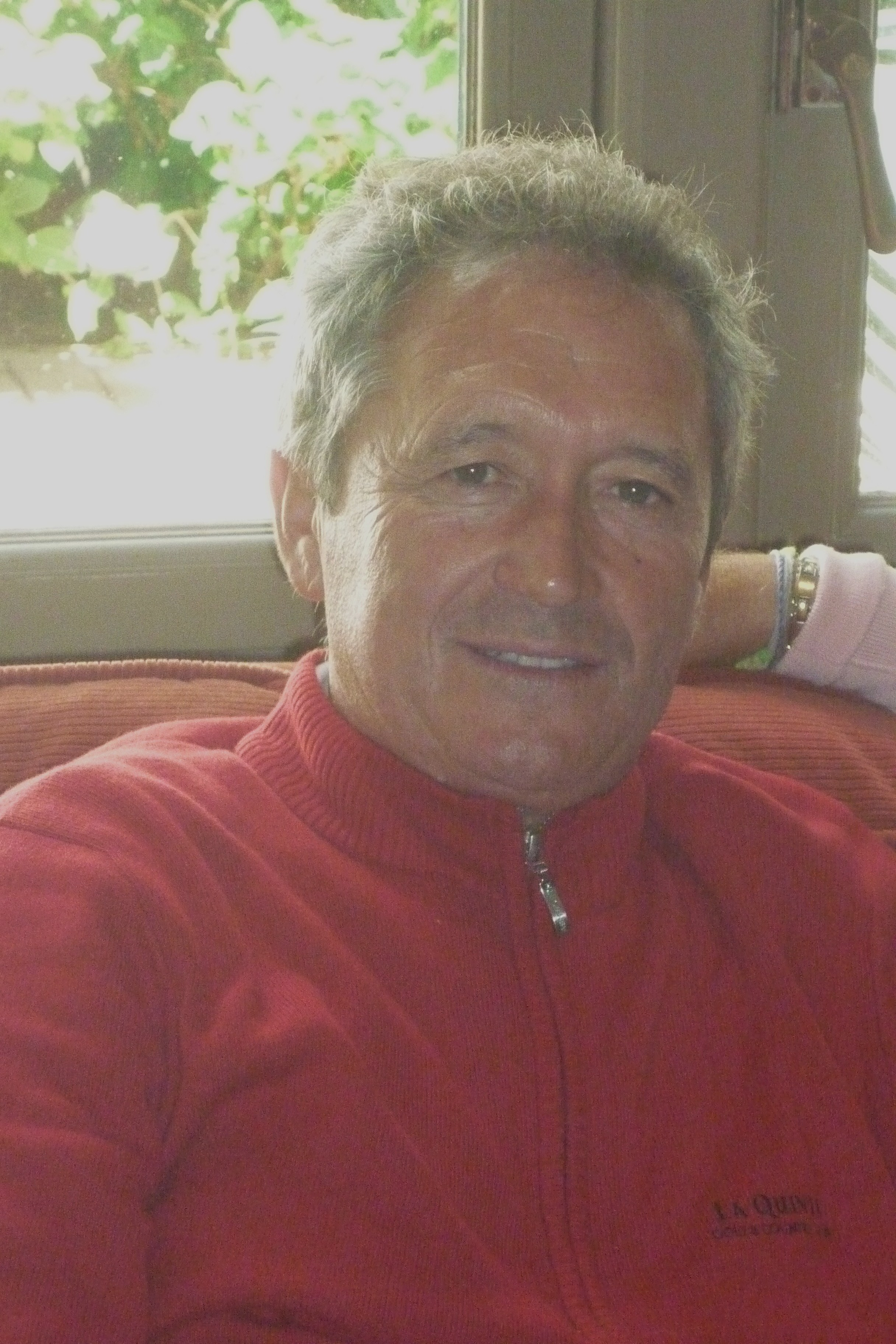

Personal information
- Full name: Manuel Piñero Sánchez
- Nationality: Spain
- Born: 1 September 1952 (age 74) Badajoz, Spain
- Height: 5 ft 7 in (1.70 m)
- Weight: 151 lb (68 kg; 10.8 st)

Career
- Sport: Golf
- Turned professional: 1968
- Current tour: European Seniors Tour
- Former tour: European Tour
- Professional wins: 14

Number of wins by tour
- European Tour: 9
- Other: 5

Best results in major championships
- Masters Tournament: CUT: 1978
- PGA Championship: CUT: 1986
- U.S. Open: DNP
- The Open Championship: T6: 1981

Manuel Piñero Sánchez (born 1 September 1952) is a Spanish professional golfer.

== Early life ==
Piñero was born in Badajoz in the Extremadura region of Spain.

His interest in golf started by co-incidence. Living in Madrid in his youth, on his way to a tennis club, looking for work as a ballboy, his grandfather instead left him at the Club de Campo golf course where they were looking for new caddies.

He turned professional in 1968, 16 years old.

== Professional career ==
Piñero established himself on the European Tour in the early 1970s. He won nine titles on tour, the most prestigious of them the 1977 British PGA Championship, beating a field that included some of the superstars of the game, Tom Watson in the hight of his career as well as Gary Player and Arnold Palmer. Piñero featured in the top ten on the European Tour Order of Merit five times, including back to back fourth places in 1976 and 1977.

Piñero played for Europe in two Ryder Cups. In 1981 he defeated Jerry Pate 2 & 1 in his singles match. In 1985 he claimed four points out of five for the team which captured the trophy from the United States for the first time since 1957, defeating Lanny Wadkins 3 & 1 in singles. He was also a member of Spain's two man team at the World Cup of Golf nine times, collecting the team title in 1976 and 1982. On the latter occasion he also won the individual title.

After turning fifty in 2002 Piñero played on the European Seniors Tour, but he had had little success at that level.

== Personal life ==
Piñero was with Bing Crosby when Crosby died. On 14 October 1977, Piñero teamed up with Crosby, at the La Moraleja Golf course near Madrid, in a recreational match against fellow Spanish pro Valentín Barrios and his amateur partner Cesar de Zulueta, owner of the course. Shortly after the match ended Crosby had a heart attack at the edge of the clubhouse and died instantaneously.

== Professional wins (18) ==
=== European Tour wins (9) ===
No.	Date	Tournament	Winning score	Margin of victory	Runner(s)-up
1	27 Apr 1974	Madrid Open	−5 (73-71-69-70=283)	Playoff	(Spain) Valentín Barrios
2	25 Jul 1976	Swiss Open	−6 (69-70-67-68=274)	3 strokes	(United States) Dave Hill
3	28 May 1977	Penfold PGA Championship	+3 (73-70-74-66=283)	3 strokes	(England) Peter Oosterhuis
4	12 Jul 1980	Mazda Cars English Classic	−2 (69-69-72-76=286)	1 stroke	(Scotland) Sandy Lyle
5	26 Apr 1981	Madrid Open (2)	−9 (70-68-69-72=279)	5 strokes	(Republic of Ireland) Des Smyth
6	30 Aug 1981	Swiss Open (2)	−11 (69-73-69-66=277)	Playoff	(Spain) Antonio Garrido, (Zimbabwe) Tony Johnstone
7	5 Sep 1982	European Open Championship	−14 (68-68-67-63=266)	2 strokes	(Scotland) Sam Torrance
8	28 Apr 1985	Cepsa Madrid Open (3)	−10 (67-71-67-73=278)	Playoff	(Spain) José María Cañizares
9	5 May 1985	Italian Open	−21 (69-66-66-66=267)	1 stroke	(Scotland) Sam Torrance

European Tour playoff record (3–0)

No.	Year	Tournament	Opponent(s)	Result
1	1974	Madrid Open	(Spain) Valentín Barrios	Won with birdie on first extra hole
2	1981	Swiss Open	(Spain) Antonio Garrido, (Zimbabwe) Tony Johnstone	Won with birdie on first extra hole
3	1985	Cepsa Madrid Open	(Spain) José María Cañizares	Won with birdie on fourth extra hole

=== Other wins (8) ===
- 1973 Spanish Professional Closed Championship
- 1974 Spanish Professional Closed Championship
- 1976 World Cup (with Seve Ballesteros)
- 1982 World Cup (with José María Cañizares)
- 1982 World Cup Individual Trophy
- 1983 Spanish Professional Closed Championship
- 1984 Spanish Professional Closed Championship
- 1989 Spanish Professional Closed Championship

=== Other senior wins (1) ===
- 2003 Spanish Seniors Professional Closed Championship

== Results in major championships ==
Tournament	1977	1978	1979	1980	1981	1982	1983	1984	1985	1986	1987	1988	1989	1990	1991	1992	1993
Masters Tournament		CUT															
The Open Championship	T36	CUT	CUT	T58	T6	T51	T45	T36	T25	T19	CUT	65			CUT		T51
PGA Championship										CUT							

Note: Piñero never played in the U.S. Open.

Top 10
Did not play

CUT = missed the half-way cut (3rd round cut in 1978 Open Championship)
"T" indicates a tie for a place

== Team appearances ==
Professional

- Double Diamond International (representing Continental Europe): 1974, 1976 (captain)
- World Cup (representing Spain): 1974, 1976 (winners), 1978, 1979, 1980, 1982 (winners, individual winner), 1983, 1985, 1988
- Philip Morris International (representing Spain): 1975
- Hennessy Cognac Cup (representing the Continent of Europe): 1976, 1978, 1980, 1982
- Ryder Cup (representing Europe): 1981, 1985 (winners)
- Dunhill Cup (representing Spain): 1985

== See also ==
- List of golfers with most European Tour wins
