= 1985 Dunhill Cup =

Coordinates: 56.351°N 2.816°W

Tournament information
- Dates: 17–20 October
- Location: St Andrews, Scotland
- Course: Old Course at St Andrews
- Format: Match play

Statistics
- Par: 72
- Length: 6,933 yards (6,340 m)
- Field: 16 teams of 3 players
- Prize fund: US$1,200,000
- Winner's share: US$300,000

Champion
- Australia (David Graham, Graham Marsh, Greg Norman)

The 1985 Dunhill Cup was the first Dunhill Cup. It was a team tournament featuring 16 countries, each represented by three players. The Cup was played 17–20 October at the Old Course at St Andrews in Scotland. The sponsor was the Alfred Dunhill company. The Australian team of David Graham, Graham Marsh, and Greg Norman beat the American team of Raymond Floyd, Mark O'Meara, and Curtis Strange in the final.

== Format ==
The Cup was played as a single-elimination, match play event played over four days. The top eight teams were seeded with the remaining teams randomly placed in the bracket. In each match, the three players were paired with their opponents and played 18 holes at medal match play. Tied matches were extended to a sudden-death playoff only if they affected the outcome between the two teams.

== Bracket ==
First round
1 | United States | 3
France | 0
8 | Canada | 1
New Zealand | 2
5 | Japan | 3
Philippines | 0
4 | Scotland | 2
Brazil | 1
2 | Australia | 2
Hong Kong | 1
7 | England | 2
Ireland | 1
6 | Taiwan | 1
Wales | 2
3 | Spain | 3
Nigeria | 0

Quarter-finals
1 | United States | 3
New Zealand | 0
5 | Japan | 0
4 | Scotland | 3
2 | Australia | 2
7 | England | 1
Wales | 2.5
3 | Spain | 0.5

Semi-finals
1 | United States | 2
4 | Scotland | 1
2 | Australia | 2
Wales | 1

Final
1 | United States | 0
2 | Australia | 3
Third place
4 | Scotland | 2
Wales | 1

== Round by round scores ==
=== First round ===
| New Zealand – 2 | | Canada – 1 | |
| Player | Score | Player | Score |
|---|---|---|---|
| Bob Charles | 70 | Dave Barr | 71 |
| Frank Nobilo | 70 | Jerry Anderson | 74 |
| Stuart Reese | 77 | Dan Halldorson | 72 |

| United States – 3 | | France – 0 | |
| Player | Score | Player | Score |
|---|---|---|---|
| Curtis Strange | 70 | Géry Watine | 73 |
| Mark O'Meara | 66 | Bernard Pascassio | 72 |
| Raymond Floyd | 70 | Michel Tapia | 73 |

| Japan – 3 | | Philippines – 0 | |
| Player | Score | Player | Score |
|---|---|---|---|
| Isao Aoki | 71 | J. Rates | 77 |
| Kikuo Arai | 73 | M. Slodina | 74 |
| Masahiro Kuramoto | 73 | D. Bagtas | 82 |

| Australia – 2 | | Hong Kong – 1 | |
| Player | Score | Player | Score |
|---|---|---|---|
| David Graham | 73 | Ming Yau Sui | 72 |
| Graham Marsh | 73 | Lee Parker | 83 |
| Greg Norman | 71 | Alex Tang | 84 |

| Scotland – 2 | | Brazil – 1 | |
| Player | Score | Player | Score |
|---|---|---|---|
| Gordon Brand Jnr | 71 | Jaime Gonzalez | 73 |
| Sam Torrance | 71 | Frederico German | 76 |
| Sandy Lyle | 75 | Rafael Navarro | 73 |

| England – 2 | | Ireland – 1 | |
| Player | Score | Player | Score |
|---|---|---|---|
| Howard Clark | 67 | Christy O'Connor Jnr | 72 |
| Nick Faldo | 68 | David Feherty | 72 |
| Paul Way | 76 | Des Smyth | 70 |

| Wales – 2 | | Taiwan – 1 | |
| Player | Score | Player | Score |
|---|---|---|---|
| David Llewellyn | 77 | Lu Liang-Huan | 74 |
| Ian Woosnam | 68 | Chen Tze-chung | 72 |
| Philip Parkin | 70 | Chen Tze-ming | 75 |

| Spain – 3 | | Nigeria – 0 | |
| Player | Score | Player | Score |
|---|---|---|---|
| José María Cañizares | 73 | T. Udumoh | 75 |
| Manuel Piñero | 70 | C. Okwu | 78 |
| Seve Ballesteros | 67 | Peter Akakasiaka | 82 |

=== Quarter-finals ===
| United States – 3 | | New Zealand – 0 | |
| Player | Score | Player | Score |
|---|---|---|---|
| Mark O'Meara | 69 | Bob Charles | 70 |
| Curtis Strange | 67 | Frank Nobilo | 75 |
| Raymond Floyd | 69 | Stuart Reese | 72 |

| Scotland – 3 | | Japan – 0 | |
| Player | Score | Player | Score |
|---|---|---|---|
| Sandy Lyle | 67 | Masahiro Kuramoto | 70 |
| Sam Torrance | 68 | Isao Aoki | 71 |
| Gordon Brand Jnr | 72 | Kikuo Arai | 73 |

| Wales – 2.5 | | Spain – 0.5 | |
| Player | Score | Player | Score |
|---|---|---|---|
| Ian Woosnam | 69 | Manuel Piñero | 70 |
| David Llewellyn | 71 | Seve Ballesteros | 71 |
| Philip Parkin | 67 | José María Cañizares | 69 |

| England – 1 | | Australia – 2 | |
| Player | Score | Player | Score |
|---|---|---|---|
| Howard Clark | 70 | Greg Norman | 69 |
| Paul Way | 72 | David Graham | 69 |
| Nick Faldo | 69 | Graham Marsh | 73 |

=== Semi-finals ===
| United States – 2 | | Scotland – 1 | |
| Player | Score | Player | Score |
|---|---|---|---|
| Mark O'Meara | 69 | Sandy Lyle | 72 |
| Curtis Strange | 72 | Sam Torrance | 73 |
| Raymond Floyd | 72 | Gordon Brand Jnr | 71 |

| Australia – 2 | | Wales – 1 | |
| Player | Score | Player | Score |
|---|---|---|---|
| Greg Norman | 70 | Ian Woosnam | 73 |
| David Graham | 74 | David Llewellyn | 69 |
| Graham Marsh | 69 | Philip Parkin | 74 |

=== Final ===
| Australia – 3 | | United States – 0 | |
| Player | Score | Player | Score |
|---|---|---|---|
| Greg Norman | 65 | Mark O'Meara | 71 |
| David Graham | 69 | Curtis Strange | 72 |
| Graham Marsh | 71 | Raymond Floyd | 74 |

=== Third place ===
| Scotland – 2 | | Wales – 1 | |
| Player | Score | Player | Score |
|---|---|---|---|
| Sandy Lyle | 70 | Ian Woosnam | 71 |
| Gordon Brand Jnr | 70 | David Llewellyn | 76 |
| Sam Torrance | 74 | Philip Parkin | 71 |

== Team results ==
| Country | Place | W | L | Seed |
|---|---|---|---|---|
| Australia | 1 | 9 | 3 | 2 |
| United States | 2 | 8 | 4 | 1 |
| Scotland | 3 | 8 | 4 | 4 |
| Wales | 4 | 6.5 | 5.5 | |
| Spain | T5 | 3.5 | 2.5 | 3 |
| England | T5 | 3 | 3 | 7 |
| Japan | T5 | 3 | 3 | 5 |
| New Zealand | T5 | 2 | 4 | |
| Brazil | T9 | 1 | 2 | |
| Canada | T9 | 1 | 2 | 8 |
| Hong Kong | T9 | 1 | 2 | |
| Ireland | T9 | 1 | 2 | |
| Taiwan | T9 | 1 | 2 | 6 |
| France | T9 | 0 | 3 | |
| Nigeria | T9 | 0 | 3 | |
| Philippines | T9 | 0 | 3 | |

== Player results ==
| Country | Player | W | L |
|---|---|---|---|
| Australia | Greg Norman | 4 | 0 |
| Australia | Graham Marsh | 3 | 1 |
| Australia | David Graham | 2 | 2 |
| United States | Mark O'Meara | 3 | 1 |
| United States | Curtis Strange | 3 | 1 |
| United States | Raymond Floyd | 2 | 2 |
| Scotland | Gordon Brand Jnr | 4 | 0 |
| Scotland | Sandy Lyle | 2 | 2 |
| Scotland | Sam Torrance | 2 | 2 |
| Wales | Philip Parkin | 3 | 1 |
| Wales | Ian Woosnam | 2 | 2 |
| Wales | David Llewellyn | 1.5 | 2.5 |
| Spain | Seve Ballesteros | 1.5 | 0.5 |
| Spain | José María Cañizares | 1 | 1 |
| Spain | Manuel Piñero | 1 | 1 |
| England | Nick Faldo | 2 | 0 |
| England | Howard Clark | 1 | 1 |
| England | Paul Way | 0 | 2 |
| Japan | Isao Aoki | 1 | 1 |
| Japan | Kikuo Arai | 1 | 1 |
| Japan | Masahiro Kuramoto | 1 | 1 |
| New Zealand | Bob Charles | 1 | 1 |
| New Zealand | Frank Nobilo | 1 | 1 |
| New Zealand | Stuart Reese | 0 | 2 |
| Brazil | Rafael Navarro | 1 | 0 |
| Brazil | Frederico German | 0 | 1 |
| Brazil | Jaime Gonzalez | 0 | 1 |
| Canada | Dan Halldorson | 1 | 0 |
| Canada | Jerry Anderson | 0 | 1 |
| Canada | Dave Barr | 0 | 1 |
| Hong Kong | Ming Yau Sui | 1 | 0 |
| Hong Kong | Lee Parker | 0 | 1 |
| Hong Kong | Alex Tang | 0 | 1 |
| Ireland | Des Smyth | 1 | 0 |
| Ireland | David Feherty | 0 | 1 |
| Ireland | Christy O'Connor Jnr | 0 | 1 |
| Taiwan | Lu Liang-Huan | 1 | 0 |
| Taiwan | Chen Tze-chung | 0 | 1 |
| Taiwan | Chen Tze-ming | 0 | 1 |
| France | Bernard Pascassio | 0 | 1 |
| France | Michel Tapia | 0 | 1 |
| France | Géry Watine | 0 | 1 |
| Nigeria | Peter Akakasiaka | 0 | 1 |
| Nigeria | C. Okwu | 0 | 1 |
| Nigeria | T. Udumoh | 0 | 1 |
| Philippines | D. Bagtas | 0 | 1 |
| Philippines | J. Rates | 0 | 1 |
| Philippines | M. Slodina | 0 | 1 |
