= Sandy Lyle =

Scottish professional golfer (born 1958)

Sandy Lyle OBE
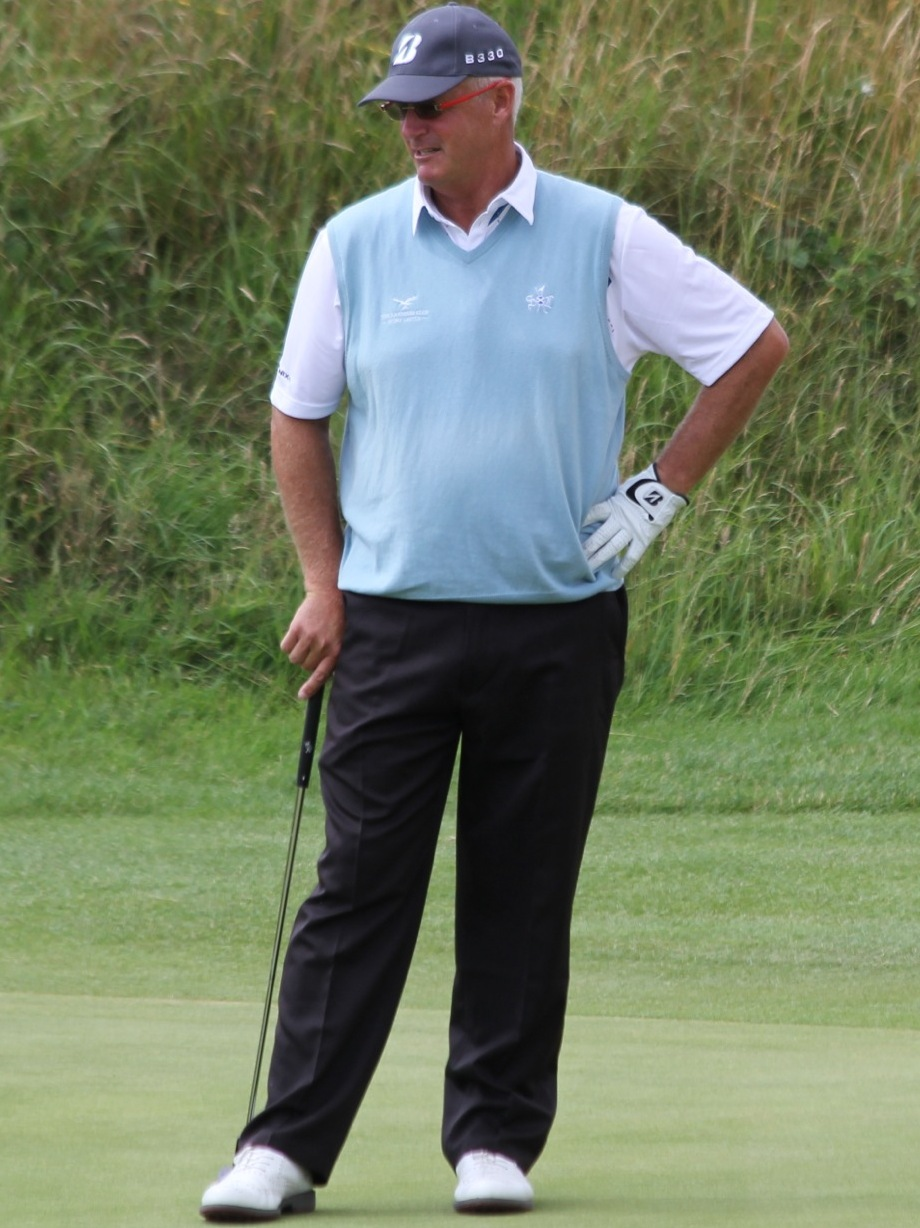
- Lyle in 2013

Personal information
- Full name: Alexander Walter Barr Lyle
- Nationality: Scotland
- Born: 9 February 1958 (age 68) Shrewsbury, Shropshire, England
- Height: 6 ft 0 in (183 cm)
- Spouses: Christine (m. 1981; div. 1987) Jolande (m. 1989)
- Children: 4

Career
- Sport: Golf
- Turned professional: 1977
- Current tours: European Senior Tour; Champions Tour
- Former tours: European Tour; PGA Tour
- Professional wins: 30
- Highest ranking: 2 (10 April 1988)

Number of wins by tour
- PGA Tour: 6
- European Tour: 18
- Japan Golf Tour: 1
- European Senior Tour: 1
- Other: 6

Best results in major championships (wins: 2)
- Masters Tournament: Won: 1988
- PGA Championship: T16: 1991
- U.S. Open: T16: 1991
- The Open Championship: Won: 1985

Achievements and awards
- World Golf Hall of Fame: 2012 (member page)
- Sir Henry Cotton Rookie of the Year: 1978
- European Tour Order of Merit winner/ Official money list winner: 1979, 1980, 1985

Alexander Walter Barr "Sandy" Lyle (born 9 February 1958) is a Scottish professional golfer. He has won two major championships during his career. Along with Nick Faldo and Ian Woosnam, he became one of Britain's top golfers during the 1980s. He spent 167 weeks in the top-10 of the Official World Golf Ranking from its introduction, in 1986, until 1989.

== Early life ==
Lyle was born in Shrewsbury, England. He represented Scotland during his professional career. He was introduced to golf by his father, Alex, who had taken the family from Scotland to England in 1955 when he became resident professional at Hawkstone Park golf course. Their family home was just 40 yards from the pro-shop and 18th green. He began playing with miniature clubs at the age of 3.

As a schoolboy, at junior and amateur level, Lyle represented England.

== Amateur career ==
In the summer of 1974, Lyle received a golf scholarship to the University of Houston. However, he did not pass the entrance examination and was not allowed to attend the university. Lyle returned to Britain "to find another route into professional golf."

As an amateur Lyle made his debut in The Open Championship at age 16 in 1974 and won the Brabazon Trophy in 1975 and 1977. He was a member of the Walker Cup team in 1977.

== Professional career ==
In 1977 he turned professional and decided to represent Scotland. He was medalist at the 1977 Qualifying School tournament for the European Tour. His first professional win came in the 1978 Nigerian Open, and he also won the Sir Henry Cotton Award as European Rookie of the Year that season. Lyle attained the first of an eventual 18 European Tour titles in 1979.

Lyle, for Scotland, finished runner-up at the World Cup of Golf team event in 1979, 1980 and 1987; in the latter year Lyle captured the low individual trophy in that event.

Lyle showed his quality by winning The Open Championship at Royal St George's Golf Club in 1985. He was the first British winner since Tony Jacklin in 1969, and started the rise of British golfers in the world scene.

Lyle was a member of five European Ryder Cup teams, from 1979 to 1987 inclusive. Highlights from those years included the team that was victorious at the Belfry in the autumn of 1985, and the 1987 team which won for the first time ever on American soil, at Muirfield Village.

For many golf fans he is best known for the fairway bunker shot and the subsequent birdie putt at the 18th hole in the final round of the Masters in 1988 when he became the first Briton to wear the green jacket. He also won two other events on the PGA Tour that season, along with the World Match Play Championship, after being a losing finalist on several occasions.

Lyle topped the European Tour Order of Merit in 1979, 1980 and 1985. He finished in the top ten nine times between 1979 and 1992. He was also a member of the PGA Tour for several years and finished seventh on the US money list in 1988, despite a limited playing schedule. He won the 1987 Tournament Players Championship, one of the most prestigious American titles. Lyle's form dropped after 1992, when he was 34, and he has not won a significant event since.

=== Senior career ===
On turning 50 in 2008, Lyle played on the Champions Tour and the European Senior Tour.

Lyle won his first tournament in 19 years when he captured his first European Senior Tour title at the 2011 ISPS Handa Senior World Championship, held in China.

He took up hickory golf, winning the World Hickory Open in his native Scotland in 2014 and 2016. Lyle referred to the 2016 victory as his "fourth major" to go along with the 2014 crown, as well as the 1988 Masters and 1985 Open titles.

== Legacy ==
As a player, Lyle is known for his cool temperament and placid exterior. In his peak years, he was very long from the tee and through the set, and had enough accuracy to master any course. His achievements inspired fellow rivals such as Nick Faldo and Ian Woosnam to raise their games, and go on to win the majors. Lyle published his first book, "To the Fairway Born" in 2006. In the same year he was assistant captain to Ian Woosnam when Europe won the Ryder Cup. He had been hoping to be picked as the captain for the 2010 European Ryder Cup team but missed out to Colin Montgomerie.

In July 2009, Lyle became involved in a public row with Colin Montgomerie where he unfavourably compared Montgomerie's actions at the Indonesian Open four years previously with his own actions in not completing a round at the 2008 Open Championship. Reaction to this was mixed with some players supporting Lyle while other players and commentators felt that Lyle's timing was unfortunate and that any point he may have had was lost in the ensuing controversy.

== Personal life ==
Lyle lives in Scotland. He is married to Jolande. They have two children.

== Awards and honors ==
- In 2012, Lyle was inducted to the World Golf Hall of Fame.
- In 2024, Lyle was appointed Officer of the Order of the British Empire (OBE) in the 2024 Birthday Honours for services to golf.

== Amateur wins ==
- 1975 Brabazon Trophy, Carris Trophy
- 1977 Brabazon Trophy, Berkshire Trophy, British Youths Open Amateur Championship, Berkhamsted Trophy, Hampshire Hog

== Professional wins (30) ==
=== PGA Tour wins (6) ===
Legend
Major championships (2)
Players Championships (1)
Other PGA Tour (3)

No.	Date	Tournament	Winning score	Margin of victory	Runner-up
1	21 Jul 1985	The Open Championship	+2 (68-71-73-70=282)	1 stroke	(United States) Payne Stewart
2	6 Apr 1986	Greater Greensboro Open	−13 (68-64-73-70=275)	2 strokes	(United States) Andy Bean
3	29 Mar 1987	Tournament Players Championship	−14 (67-71-66-70=274)	Playoff	(United States) Jeff Sluman
4	31 Jan 1988	Phoenix Open	−15 (68-68-68-65=269)	Playoff	(United States) Fred Couples
5	3 Apr 1988	KMart Greater Greensboro Open (2)	−17 (68-63-68-72=271)	Playoff	(United States) Ken Green
6	10 Apr 1988	Masters Tournament	−7 (71-67-72-71=281)	1 stroke	(United States) Mark Calcavecchia

PGA Tour playoff record (3–1)

No.	Year	Tournament	Opponent(s)	Result
1	1987	Tournament Players Championship	(United States) Jeff Sluman	Won with par on third extra hole
2	1988	Phoenix Open	(United States) Fred Couples	Won with bogey on third extra hole
3	1988	KMart Greater Greensboro Open	(United States) Ken Green	Won with birdie on first extra hole
4	1989	Bob Hope Chrysler Classic	(United States) Paul Azinger, (United States) Steve Jones	Jones won with birdie on first extra hole

=== European Tour wins (18) ===
Legend
Major championships (2)
Tour Championships (1)
Other European Tour (15)

No.	Date	Tournament	Winning score	Margin of victory	Runner(s)-up
1	3 Jun 1979	B.A./Avis Open	−13 (66-71-66-68=271)	3 strokes	(England) Howard Clark
2	8 Jul 1979	Scandinavian Enterprise Open	−12 (73-69-65-69=276)	3 strokes	(Spain) Seve Ballesteros
3	9 Sep 1979	European Open Championship	−9 (71-67-72-65=275)	7 strokes	(South Africa) Dale Hayes, (England) Peter Townsend
4	29 Jun 1980	Coral Welsh Classic	−11 (72-69-67-69=277)	5 strokes	(England) Martin Foster
5	10 May 1981	Paco Rabanne Open de France	−14 (70-66-67-67=270)	4 strokes	(West Germany) Bernhard Langer
6	7 Jun 1981	Lawrence Batley International	−4 (70-70-69-71=280)	2 strokes	(England) Nick Faldo
7	25 Jul 1982	Lawrence Batley International (2)	−15 (70-66-67-66=269)	2 strokes	(Spain) Manuel Piñero
8	24 Apr 1983	Cepsa Madrid Open	−3 (70-69-76-70=285)	2 strokes	(England) Gordon J. Brand
9	6 May 1984	Italian Open	−11 (71-70-68-68=277)	4 strokes	(United States) Bobby Clampett
10	7 Oct 1984	Trophée Lancôme	−10 (74-70-67-67=278)	Playoff	(Spain) Seve Ballesteros
11	21 Jul 1985	The Open Championship	+2 (68-71-73-70=282)	1 stroke	(United States) Payne Stewart
12	18 Aug 1985	Benson & Hedges International Open	−14 (70-69-71-64=274)	1 stroke	(Wales) Ian Woosnam
13	11 Oct 1987	German Masters	−10 (73-69-70-66=278)	Playoff	(West Germany) Bernhard Langer
14	10 Apr 1988	Masters Tournament	−7 (71-67-72-71=281)	1 stroke	(United States) Mark Calcavecchia
15	5 Jun 1988	Dunhill British Masters	−15 (66-68-68-71=273)	2 strokes	(England) Nick Faldo, (Zimbabwe) Mark McNulty
16	13 Oct 1991	BMW International Open	−20 (65-65-71-67=268)	3 strokes	(Zimbabwe) Tony Johnstone
17	3 May 1992	Lancia Martini Italian Open (2)	−18 (66-71-65-68=270)	1 stroke	(Scotland) Colin Montgomerie
18	1 Nov 1992	Volvo Masters	+3 (72-70-72-73=287)	Playoff	(Scotland) Colin Montgomerie

European Tour playoff record (3–3)

No.	Year	Tournament	Opponent	Result
1	1983	Ebel European Masters Swiss Open	(England) Nick Faldo	Lost to par on second extra hole
2	1984	Trophée Lancôme	(Spain) Seve Ballesteros	Won with birdie on first extra hole
3	1985	Whyte & Mackay PGA Championship	(England) Paul Way	Lost to birdie on third extra hole
4	1985	Glasgow Open	(England) Howard Clark	Lost to birdie on second extra hole
5	1987	German Masters	(West Germany) Bernhard Langer	Won with par on second extra hole
6	1992	Volvo Masters	(Scotland) Colin Montgomerie	Won with par on first extra hole

=== PGA of Japan Tour wins (1) ===
No.	Date	Tournament	Winning score	Margin of victory	Runner-up
1	25 Nov 1984	Casio World Open	−9 (68-69-71-71=279)	Playoff	(United States) Gary Koch

PGA of Japan Tour playoff record (1–0)

No.	Year	Tournament	Opponent	Result
1	1984	Casio World Open	(United States) Gary Koch	Won with birdie on first extra hole

=== Safari Circuit wins (1) ===
No.	Date	Tournament	Winning score	Margin of victory	Runner-up
1	27 Feb 1978	Nigerian Open	−15 (61-63-70-75=269)	Playoff	(England) Michael King

=== Other wins (5) ===
No.	Date	Tournament	Winning score	Margin of victory	Runner-up
1	2 Sep 1979	STV Scottish Professional Championship	−10 (66-71-70-67=274)	Playoff	(Scotland) Sam Torrance
2	14 Dec 1980	World Cup International Trophy	−6 (69-69-74-70=282)	1 stroke	(West Germany) Bernhard Langer
3	11 Nov 1984	Kapalua International	−18 (68-64-69-65=266)	8 strokes	(West Germany) Bernhard Langer
4	10 Nov 1985	Nissan Cup Individual Trophy	−21 (68-67-68-64=267)	3 strokes	(United States) Curtis Strange
5	10 Oct 1988	Suntory World Match Play Championship	2 and 1		(England) Nick Faldo

Other playoff record (1–0)

No.	Year	Tournament	Opponent	Result
1	1979	STV Scottish Professional Championship	(Scotland) Sam Torrance	Won with par on third extra hole

=== European Senior Tour wins (1) ===
No.	Date	Tournament	Winning score	Margin of victory	Runner-up
1	13 Mar 2011	ISPS Handa Senior World Championship	−12 (68-66-70=204)	3 strokes	(Australia) Peter Fowler

== Playoff record ==
Korean Tour playoff record (0–1)

No.	Year	Tournament	Opponent	Result
1	1997	Hyundai Motor Masters	(Wales) Ian Woosnam	Lost to birdie on second extra hole

== Major championships ==
=== Wins (2) ===
Year	Championship	54 holes	Winning score	Margin	Runner-up
1985	The Open Championship	3 shot deficit	+2 (68-71-73-70=282)	1 stroke	(United States) Payne Stewart
1988	Masters Tournament	2 shot lead	−7 (71-67-72-71=281)	1 stroke	(United States) Mark Calcavecchia

=== Results timeline ===
Results not in chronological order in 2020.

Tournament	1974	1975	1976	1977	1978	1979
Masters Tournament						
U.S. Open						
The Open Championship	CUT			CUT	CUT	T19
PGA Championship						

Tournament	1980	1981	1982	1983	1984	1985	1986	1987	1988	1989
Masters Tournament	48	T28		CUT		T25	T11	T17	1	CUT
U.S. Open	CUT	CUT					T45	T36	T25	CUT
The Open Championship	T12	T14	T8	CUT	T14	1	T30	T17	T7	T46
PGA Championship		CUT								

Tournament	1990	1991	1992	1993	1994	1995	1996	1997	1998	1999
Masters Tournament	CUT	CUT	T37	T21	T38	CUT	CUT	T34	CUT	T48
U.S. Open	CUT	T16	T51	T52						
The Open Championship	T16	WD	T12	CUT	74	T79	T56	CUT	T19	CUT
PGA Championship		T16	CUT	T56	T73	T39				

Tournament	2000	2001	2002	2003	2004	2005	2006	2007	2008	2009
Masters Tournament	CUT	CUT	CUT	CUT	T37	CUT	CUT	43	45	T20
U.S. Open										
The Open Championship	CUT	T69	T75	CUT	73	T32	CUT	T65	WD	CUT
PGA Championship										

Tournament	2010	2011	2012	2013	2014	2015	2016	2017	2018
Masters Tournament	CUT	CUT	CUT	T54	T44	CUT	CUT	CUT	CUT
U.S. Open									
The Open Championship	CUT	CUT	CUT	84	CUT	CUT	CUT	CUT	CUT
PGA Championship									

Tournament	2019	2020	2021	2022	2023
Masters Tournament	CUT	CUT	CUT	CUT	CUT
PGA Championship					
U.S. Open					
The Open Championship		NT			

Win
Top 10
Did not play

CUT = missed the half way cut (3rd round cut in 1974 and 1983 Open Championships)
WD = withdrew
"T" indicates a tie for a place
NT = No tournament due to COVID-19 pandemic

=== Summary ===
Tournament	Wins	2nd	3rd	Top-5	Top-10	Top-25	Events	Cuts made
Masters Tournament	1	0	0	1	1	6	42	17
PGA Championship	0	0	0	0	0	1	6	4
U.S. Open	0	0	0	0	0	2	10	6
The Open Championship	1	0	0	1	3	11	43	22
Totals	2	0	0	2	4	20	101	49

- Most consecutive cuts made – 12 (1984 Open Championship – 1988 Open Championship)
- Longest streak of top-10s – 1 (four times)

== The Players Championship ==
=== Wins (1) ===
Year	Championship	54 holes	Winning score	Margin	Runner-up
1987	Tournament Players Championship	2 shot deficit	−14 (67-71-66-70=274)	Playoff	(United States) Jeff Sluman

=== Results timeline ===
Tournament	1985	1986	1987	1988	1989	1990	1991	1992	1993	1994	1995	1996	1997	1998
The Players Championship	CUT	CUT	1	CUT	CUT	CUT	CUT	CUT		T74	CUT	CUT	T70	CUT

Win
Did not play

CUT = missed the halfway cut
"T" indicates a tie for a place

== Results in senior major championships ==
Results not in chronological order before 2021.

Tournament	2008	2009
The Tradition	51	T50
Senior PGA Championship	T43	CUT
U.S. Senior Open	CUT	
Senior Players Championship	T65	T31
Senior British Open Championship	CUT	T13

Tournament	2010	2011	2012	2013	2014	2015	2016	2017	2018	2019
The Tradition		T45	T33	T69	T35	T34	T58	T57	T68	
Senior PGA Championship	CUT	CUT	T4	T42	CUT	T9	CUT	T63	T64	CUT
U.S. Senior Open										
Senior Players Championship	T67		T30	T22	T65	T64	T72		T68	T60
Senior British Open Championship	CUT	CUT	CUT	7	CUT	T51	CUT	T45	T43	CUT

Tournament	2020	2021	2022
The Tradition	NT	73	WD
Senior PGA Championship	NT		
Senior Players Championship			
U.S. Senior Open	NT		
Senior British Open Championship	NT		CUT

Top 10
Did not play

CUT = missed the halfway cut
"T" indicates a tie for a place
NT = No tournament due to COVID-19 pandemic

== Team appearances ==
Amateur

- Walker Cup (representing Great Britain and Ireland): 1977
- Commonwealth Tournament (representing Great Britain): 1975
- St Andrews Trophy (representing Great Britain & Ireland): 1976 (winners)
- European Amateur Team Championship (representing England): 1977

Professional

- Ryder Cup (representing Europe): 1979, 1981, 1983, 1985 (winners), 1987 (winners)
- World Cup (representing Scotland): 1979, 1980 (individual winner), 1987
- Hennessy Cognac Cup (representing Great Britain and Ireland): 1980 (winners), 1982 (winners), (representing Scotland) 1984 (individual winner)
- Dunhill Cup (representing Scotland): 1985, 1986, 1987, 1988, 1989, 1990, 1992
- Nissan Cup/Kirin Cup (representing Europe): 1985 (individual winner), 1986, 1987
- UBS Cup (representing the Rest of the World): 2004

== See also ==
- List of golfers with most European Tour wins
