= Warren Humphreys =

English golfer (born 1952)

Personal information
- Full name: Warren Humphreys
- Nationality: England
- Born: 1 April 1952 (age 74) Kingston upon Thames, Surrey, England
- Height: 5 ft 10 in (1.78 m)

Career
- Sport: Golf
- Turned professional: 1971
- Former tour: European Tour
- Professional wins: 1

Number of wins by tour
- European Tour: 1

Best results in major championships
- Masters Tournament: DNP
- PGA Championship: DNP
- U.S. Open: DNP
- The Open Championship: T42: 1976

Warren Humphreys (born 1 April 1952) is an English professional golfer.

== Career ==
In 1952, Humphreys was born in Kingston upon Thames, England. He had a successful amateur career, winning the 1971 English Amateur, and playing on that year's winning Great Britain & Ireland Walker Cup team.

In 1971, Humphreys turned professional. He made the top one hundred on the European Tour Order of Merit thirteen times with a best ranking of twentieth in 1973. His sole European Tour tournament victory came at the 1985 Portuguese Open.

Since retiring from tournament golf he has worked as a golf broadcaster, for Sky Sports and The Golf Channel.

== Amateur wins ==
- 1971 English Amateur, Lytham Trophy, Duncan Putter

== Professional wins (1) ==
=== European Tour wins (1) ===
No.	Date	Tournament	Winning score	Margin of victory	Runner-up
1	2 Nov 1985	Portuguese Open	−9 (69-68-71-71=279)	1 stroke	(South Africa) Hugh Baiocchi

== Playoff record ==
Southern Africa Tour playoff record (0–1)

No.	Year	Tournament	Opponents	Result
1	1981	Datsun South African Open	(South Africa) John Bland, (South Africa) Gary Player	Player won with birdie on third extra hole after 18-hole playoff; Player: −2 (70), Bland: −2 (70), Humphreys: E (72)

== Results in major championships ==
Tournament	1969	1970	1971	1972	1973	1974	1975	1976	1977	1978	1979	1980	1981	1982	1983	1984
The Open Championship	CUT	T50	CUT		CUT	CUT		T42	CUT		CUT		T56	CUT	CUT	CUT

Note: Humphreys only played in The Open Championship.

Did not play

CUT = missed the half-way cut (3rd round cut in 1969, 1973, 1982, 1983 and 1984 Open Championships)
"T" indicates a tie for a place

== Team appearances ==
Amateur

- Walker Cup (representing Great Britain & Ireland): 1971 (winners)
- St Andrews Trophy (representing Great Britain & Ireland): 1970 (winners)
- European Amateur Team Championship (representing England): 1971 (winners)
