= List of Masters Tournament champions =

Winners of the Masters Tournament since 1934

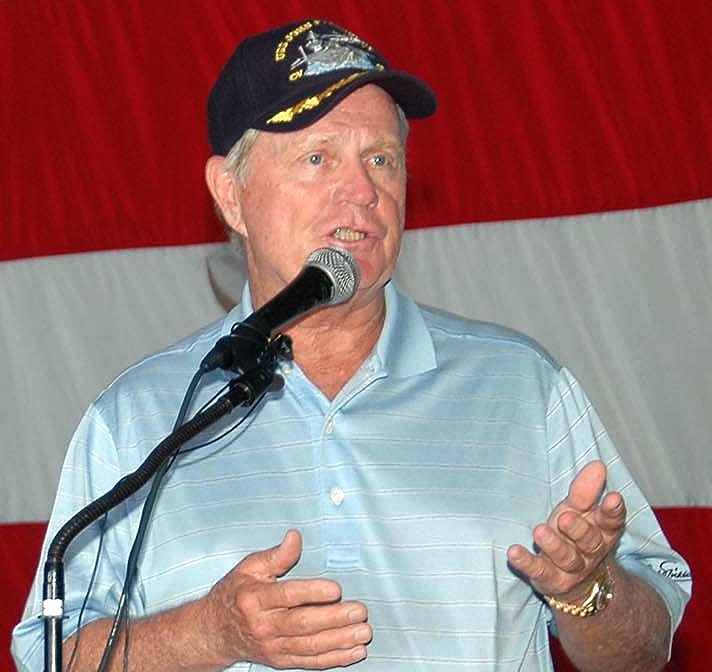
Jack Nicklaus, holding a record of six Masters victories in 1963, 1965, 1966, 1972, 1975, and 1986, is one of four golfers to successfully defend his title. He is also one of five champions to win wire-to-wire, in 1972.

The Masters Tournament is a golf competition that was established in 1934, with Horton Smith winning the inaugural tournament. The Masters is the first of four major championships to be played each year, with the final round of the Masters always being scheduled for the second Sunday in April. The Masters is the only one of the four majors to use the same course every year: the Augusta National Golf Club. Masters champions are automatically invited to play in the other three majors (the U.S. Open, the Open Championship (British Open), and the PGA Championship) for the next five years, and earn a lifetime invitation to the Masters. They also receive membership on the PGA Tour for the following five seasons and invitations to the Players Championship for the five years following their victory. The champion also receives the "Green Jacket", the first one being won by Sam Snead in 1949. The champion takes the jacket home for a year and returns it thereafter. A multiple-time champion will only have one jacket unless his size changes dramatically.

Jack Nicklaus holds the record for the most Masters victories, winning the tournament six times during his career. Nicklaus is also the oldest winner of the Masters: he was 46 years 82 days old when he won in 1986. Nicklaus, Nick Faldo, Tiger Woods, and Rory McIlroy co-hold the record for most consecutive victories with two. Woods was the youngest winner of the Masters, 21 years 104 days old when he won in 1997. Woods also set the record for the widest winning margin (12 strokes). The lowest winning score, with 268, 20-under-par, was scored by Dustin Johnson in 2020.

The highest winning score of 289 (+1) was originally set by Sam Snead in 1954, it was equalled by Jack Burke Jr. in 1956, and Zach Johnson in 2007. Six golfers have won the Masters wire-to-wire: Craig Wood in 1941, Arnold Palmer in 1960, Nicklaus in 1972, Raymond Floyd in 1976, Jordan Spieth in 2015, and Rory McIlroy in 2026. Other players have led wire-to-wire if ties after a round are included, most recently Dustin Johnson in the 2020 Masters Tournament. Rory McIlroy is the current champion. He won the 2026 Masters Tournament wire-to-wire with a final score of (−12).

== Champions ==
=== By year ===
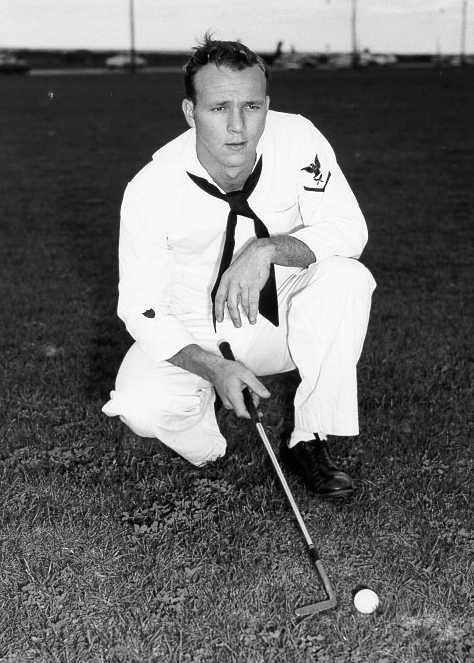
Arnold Palmer, four-time Masters Champion 1958, 1960, 1962, and 1964. He is one of five champions to win wire-to-wire with his victory in 1960.

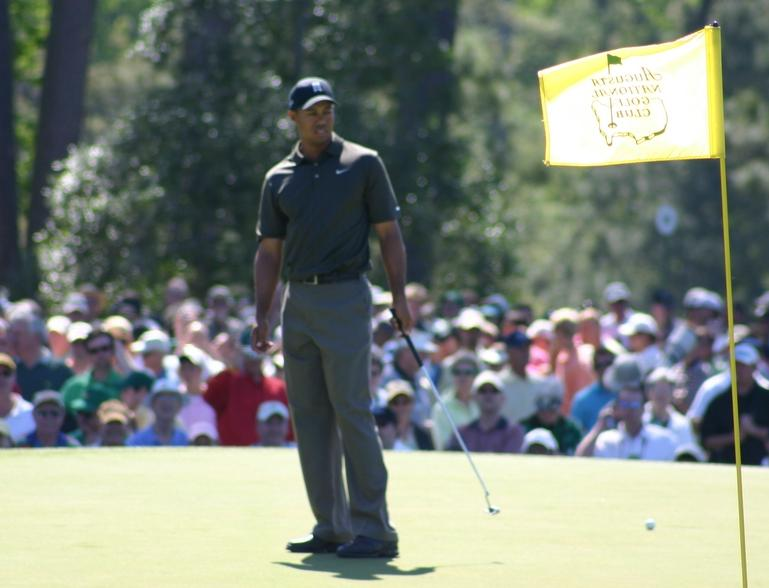
Tiger Woods, five-time Masters Champion in 1997, 2001, 2002, 2005, and 2019. Tiger is one of four golfers to successfully defend his title

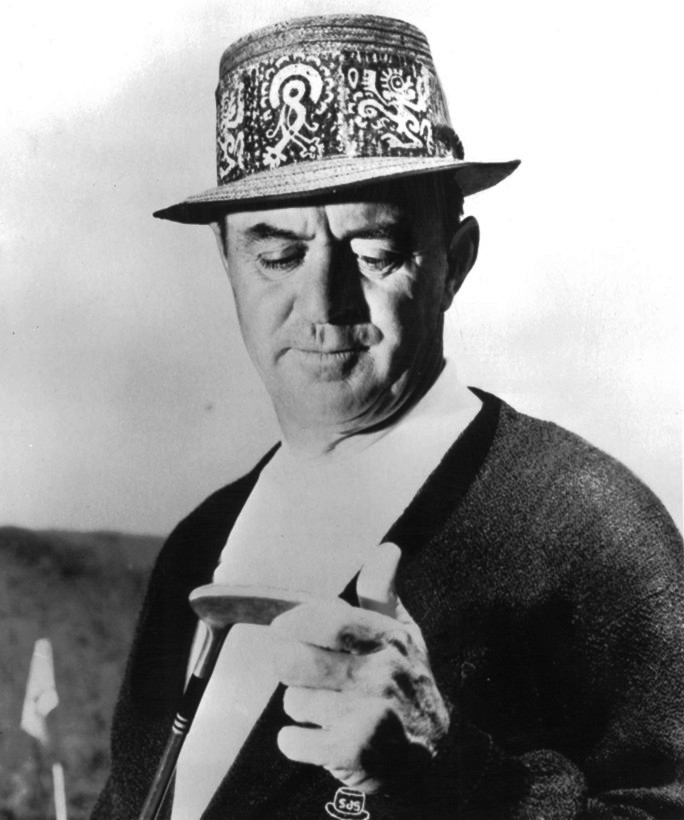
Sam Snead, three-time Masters Champion in 1949, 1952, 1954

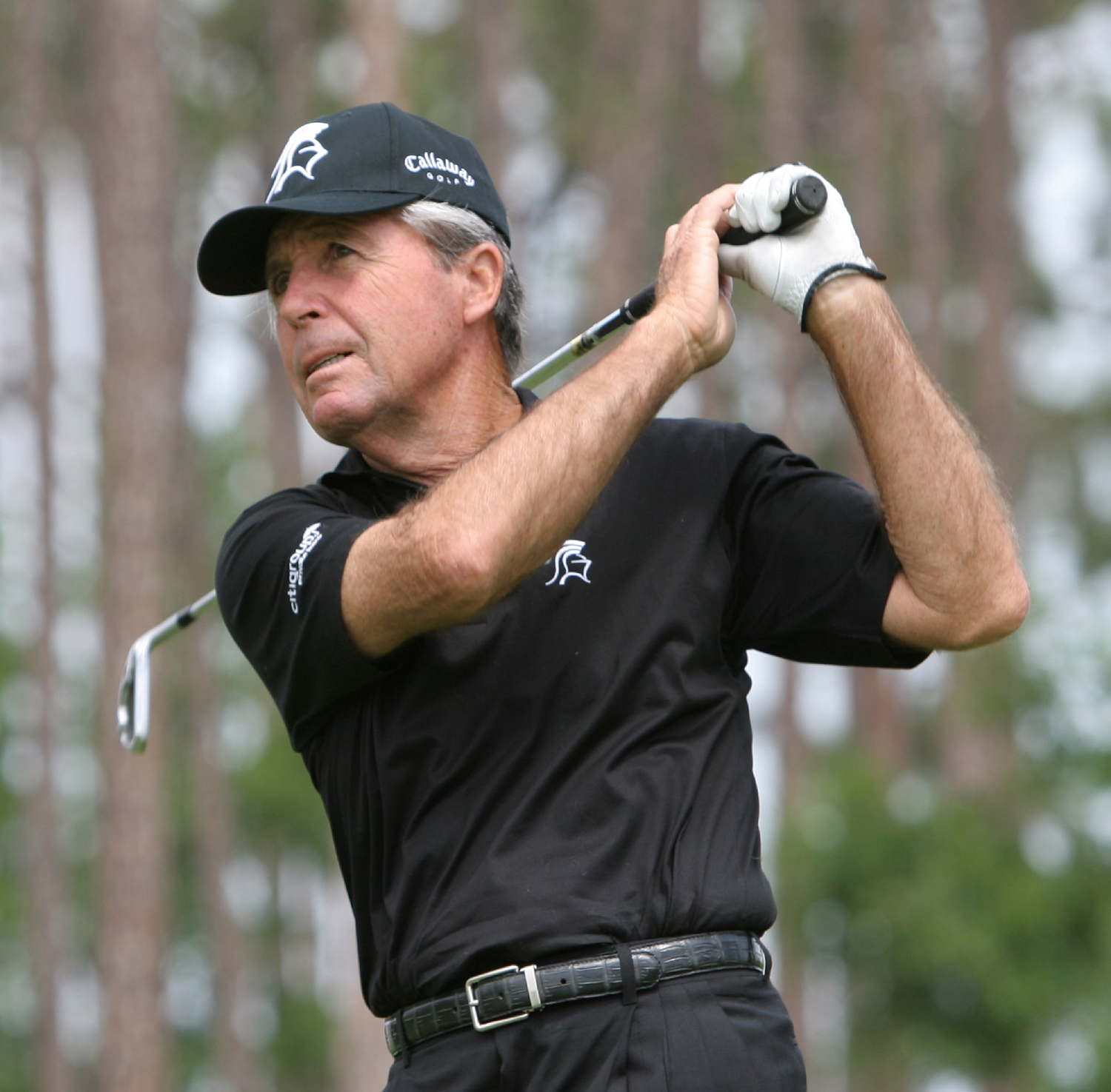
Gary Player, three-time Masters Champion in 1961, 1974, and 1978, and the first non-American to win the tournament.

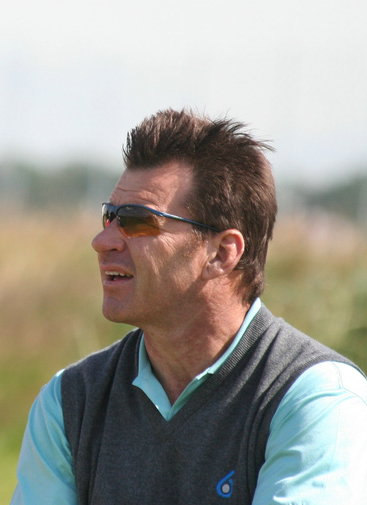
Nick Faldo, three-time Masters Champion in 1989, 1990, and 1996, and is one of four golfers to successfully defend his title

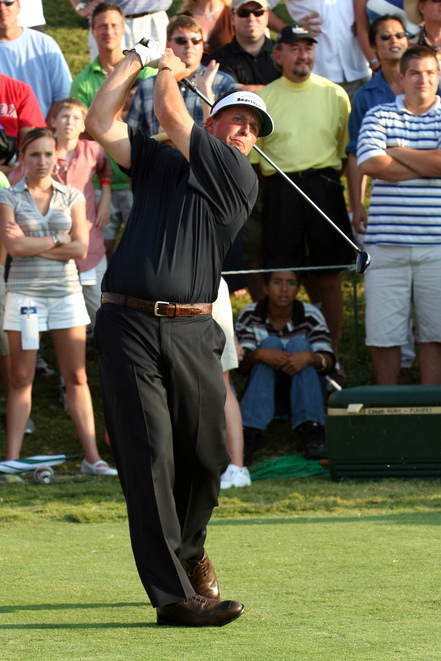
Phil Mickelson, three-time Masters Champion in 2004, 2006, and 2010

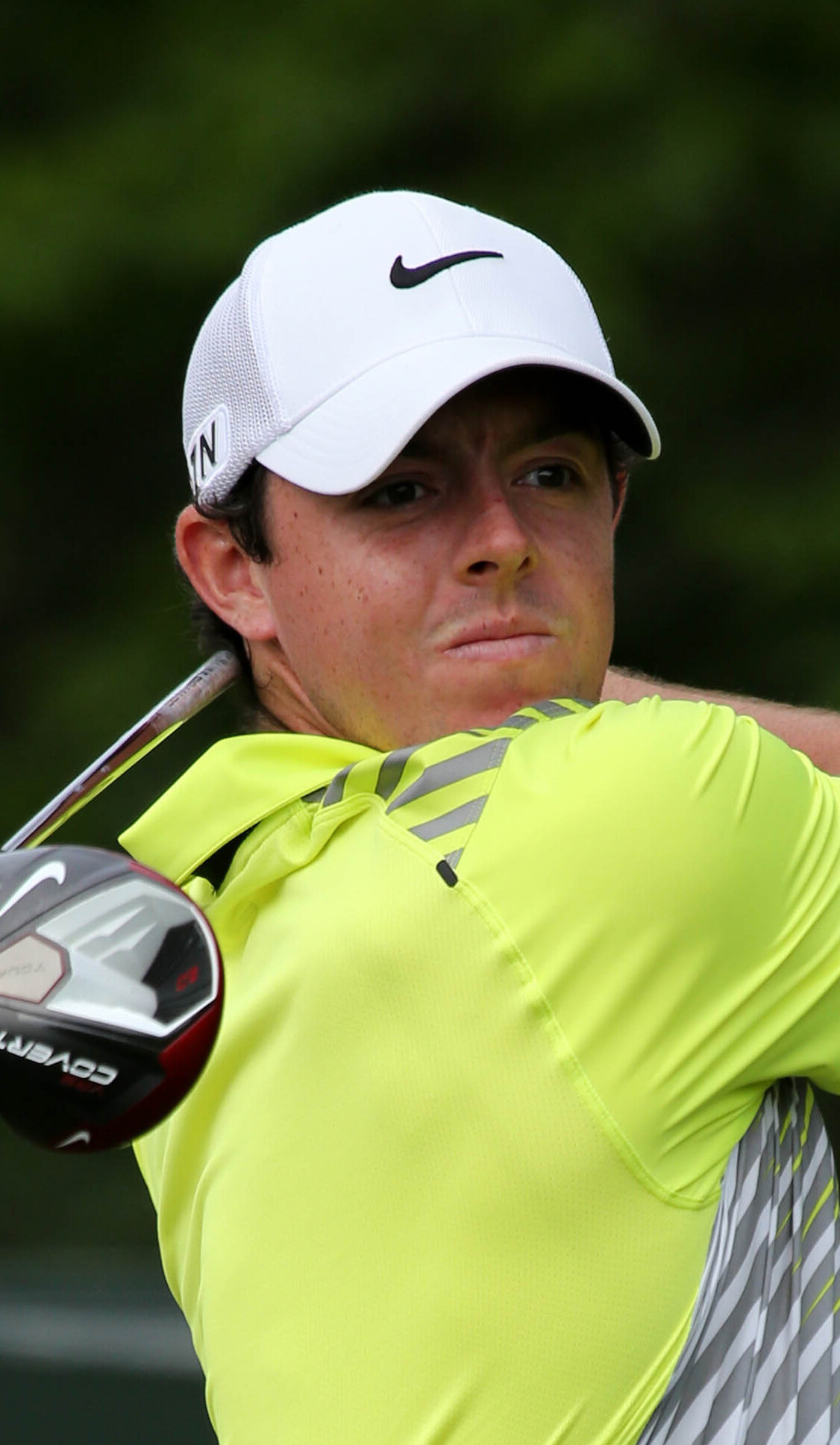
Rory McIlroy, two-time Masters Champion in 2025, 2026 and won wire-to-wire on the latter.

Key
†	Tournament won in a playoff

Masters Tournament champions
Year	Country	Champion	Total score	To par^{[a]}	Notes
1934	United States	Horton Smith	284	−4	
1935	United States	Gene Sarazen†^{[c]}	282	−6	
1936	United States	Horton Smith (2)	285	−3	
1937	United States	Byron Nelson	283	−5	
1938	United States	Henry Picard	285	−3	
1939	United States	Ralph Guldahl	279	−9	
1940	United States	Jimmy Demaret	280	−8	
1941	United States	Craig Wood	280	−8	
1942	United States	Byron Nelson (2) †^{[d]}	280	−8	
1943	—	None^{[b]}	—	—	
1944	—	None	—	—	
1945	—	None	—	—	
1946	United States	Herman Keiser	282	−6	
1947	United States	Jimmy Demaret (2)	281	−7	
1948	United States	Claude Harmon	279	−9	
1949	United States	Sam Snead	282	−6	
1950	United States	Jimmy Demaret (3)	283	−5	
1951	United States	Ben Hogan	280	−8	
1952	United States	Sam Snead (2)	286	−2	
1953	United States	Ben Hogan (2)	274	−14	
1954	United States	Sam Snead (3) †^{[e]}	289	+1	
1955	United States	Cary Middlecoff	279	−9	
1956	United States	Jack Burke Jr.	289	+1	
1957	United States	Doug Ford	283	−5	
1958	United States	Arnold Palmer	284	−4	
1959	United States	Art Wall Jr.	284	−4	
1960	United States	Arnold Palmer (2)	282	−6	
1961	South Africa	Gary Player	280	−8	
1962	United States	Arnold Palmer (3) †^{[f]}	280	−8	
1963	United States	Jack Nicklaus	286	−2	
1964	United States	Arnold Palmer (4)	276	−12	
1965	United States	Jack Nicklaus (2)	271	−17	
1966	United States	Jack Nicklaus (3) †^{[g]}	288	E	
1967	United States	Gay Brewer	280	−8	
1968	United States	Bob Goalby	277	−11	
1969	United States	George Archer	281	−7	
1970	United States	Billy Casper†^{[h]}	279	−9	
1971	United States	Charles Coody	279	−9	
1972	United States	Jack Nicklaus (4)	286	−2	
1973	United States	Tommy Aaron	283	−5	
1974	South Africa	Gary Player (2)	278	−10	
1975	United States	Jack Nicklaus (5)	276	−12	
1976	United States	Raymond Floyd	271	−17	
1977	United States	Tom Watson	276	−12	
1978	South Africa	Gary Player (3)	277	−11	
1979	United States	Fuzzy Zoeller†^{[i]}	280	−8	
1980	Spain	Seve Ballesteros	275	−13	
1981	United States	Tom Watson (2)	280	−8	
1982	United States	Craig Stadler†^{[j]}	284	−4	
1983	Spain	Seve Ballesteros (2)	280	−8	
1984	United States	Ben Crenshaw	277	−11	
1985	West Germany	Bernhard Langer	282	−6	
1986	United States	Jack Nicklaus (6)	279	−9	
1987	United States	Larry Mize†^{[k]}	285	−3	
1988	Scotland	Sandy Lyle	281	−7	
1989	England	Nick Faldo†^{[l]}	283	−5	
1990	England	Nick Faldo (2) †^{[m]}	278	−10	
1991	Wales	Ian Woosnam	277	−11	
1992	United States	Fred Couples	275	−13	
1993	Germany	Bernhard Langer (2)	277	−11	
1994	Spain	José María Olazábal	279	−9	
1995	United States	Ben Crenshaw (2)	274	−14	
1996	England	Nick Faldo (3)	276	−12	
1997	United States	Tiger Woods	270	−18	
1998	United States	Mark O'Meara	279	−9	
1999	Spain	José María Olazábal (2)	280	−8	
2000	Fiji	Vijay Singh	278	−10	
2001	United States	Tiger Woods (2)	272	−16	
2002	United States	Tiger Woods (3)	276	−12	
2003	Canada	Mike Weir†^{[n]}	281	−7	
2004	United States	Phil Mickelson	279	−9	
2005	United States	Tiger Woods (4) †^{[o]}	276	−12	
2006	United States	Phil Mickelson (2)	281	−7	
2007	United States	Zach Johnson	289	+1	
2008	South Africa	Trevor Immelman	280	−8	
2009	Argentina	Ángel Cabrera†^{[p]}	276	−12	
2010	United States	Phil Mickelson (3)	272	−16	
2011	South Africa	Charl Schwartzel	274	−14	
2012	United States	Bubba Watson†^{[q]}	278	−10	
2013	Australia	Adam Scott†^{[r]}	279	−9	
2014	United States	Bubba Watson (2)	280	−8	
2015	United States	Jordan Spieth	270	−18	
2016	England	Danny Willett	283	−5	
2017	Spain	Sergio García†^{[s]}	279	−9	
2018	United States	Patrick Reed	273	−15	
2019	United States	Tiger Woods (5)	275	−13	
2020	United States	Dustin Johnson	268	−20	
2021	Japan	Hideki Matsuyama	278	−10	
2022	United States	Scottie Scheffler	278	−10	
2023	Spain	Jon Rahm	276	−12	
2024	United States	Scottie Scheffler (2)	277	−11	
2025	Northern Ireland	Rory McIlroy†^{[t]}	277	−11	
2026	Northern Ireland	Rory McIlroy (2)	276	–12	

=== Multiple champions ===
Masters Tournament multiple champions
Golfer	Total	Years
Jack Nicklaus (USA)	6	1963, 1965, 1966, 1972, 1975, 1986
Tiger Woods (USA)	5	1997, 2001, 2002, 2005, 2019
Arnold Palmer (USA)	4	1958, 1960, 1962, 1964
Jimmy Demaret (USA)	3	1940, 1947, 1950
Sam Snead (USA)	3	1949, 1952, 1954
Gary Player (RSA)	3	1961, 1974, 1978
Nick Faldo (ENG)	3	1989, 1990, 1996
Phil Mickelson (USA)	3	2004, 2006, 2010
Horton Smith (USA)	2	1934, 1936
Byron Nelson (USA)	2	1937, 1942
Ben Hogan (USA)	2	1951, 1953
Tom Watson (USA)	2	1977, 1981
Seve Ballesteros (ESP)	2	1980, 1983
Bernhard Langer (GER)	2	1985, 1993
Ben Crenshaw (USA)	2	1984, 1995
José María Olazábal (ESP)	2	1994, 1999
Bubba Watson (USA)	2	2012, 2014
Scottie Scheffler (USA)	2	2022, 2024
Rory McIlroy (NIR)	2	2025, 2026

=== By nationality ===
Masters Tournament champions by nationality
Nationality	Wins	Winners
United States	64	39
Spain	6	4
South Africa	5	3
England	4	2
Germany	2	1
Northern Ireland	2	1
Scotland	1	1
Wales	1	1
Fiji	1	1
Canada	1	1
Argentina	1	1
Australia	1	1
Japan	1	1

== Notes ==
- ^{a} Par is a predetermined number of strokes that a golfer should require to complete a hole, a round (the sum of the total pars of the played holes), or a tournament (the sum of the total pars of each round). E stands for even, which means the tournament was completed in the predetermined number of strokes.
- ^{b} The 1943, 1944, and 1945 Masters Tournaments were not held because of World War II.
- ^{c} Gene Sarazen won in a playoff against Craig Wood.
- ^{d} Byron Nelson won in a playoff against Ben Hogan.
- ^{e} Sam Snead won in a playoff against Ben Hogan.
- ^{f} Arnold Palmer won in a playoff against Dow Finsterwald and Gary Player.
- ^{g} Jack Nicklaus won in a playoff against Gay Brewer and Tommy Jacobs.
- ^{h} Billy Casper won in a playoff against Gene Littler.
- ^{i} Fuzzy Zoeller won in a playoff against Ed Sneed and Tom Watson.
- ^{j} Craig Stadler won in a playoff against Dan Pohl.
- ^{k} Larry Mize won in a playoff against Seve Ballesteros and Greg Norman.
- ^{l} Nick Faldo won in a playoff against Scott Hoch.
- ^{m} Nick Faldo won in a playoff against Raymond Floyd.
- ^{n} Mike Weir won in a playoff against Len Mattiace.
- ^{o} Tiger Woods won in a playoff against Chris DiMarco.
- ^{p} Ángel Cabrera won in a playoff against Chad Campbell and Kenny Perry.
- ^{q} Bubba Watson won in a playoff against Louis Oosthuizen.
- ^{r} Adam Scott won in a playoff against Ángel Cabrera.
- ^{s} Sergio García won in a playoff against Justin Rose.
- ^{t} Rory McIlroy won in a playoff against Justin Rose.
