= Julian Walker (American football) =

American football player

No. 55 – South Carolina Gamecocks
- Position: Defensive end
- Class: Freshman

Personal information
- Listed height: 6 ft 6 in (1.98 m)
- Listed weight: 255 lb (116 kg)

Career information
- High school: Dutch Fork (Irmo, South Carolina)
- College: South Carolina (2026–present)
- Stats at ESPN

Julian Walker is an American college football defensive end for the South Carolina Gamecocks.

== Early life ==
Walker is from Irmo, South Carolina. He attended Dutch Fork High School where he played football as a defensive end. In his junior year, Walker recorded 50 tackles, 19 tackles-for-loss (TFLs) and 11 sacks, helping Dutch Fork to a state 5A championship win. He then helped them to another state title as a senior while leading the team with 75 tackles in addition to 19 TFLs. Walker was invited to the All-American Bowl for his performance. He was a five-star recruit in the class of 2026 and ranked by Rivals.com as the 15th-best prospect nationally, as well as the fourth best edge rusher and the best player in South Carolina. In July 2025, he announced his commitment to the Michigan Wolverines. However, in December 2025, he flipped his commitment and signed with the South Carolina Gamecocks, where his father is a coach.

== College career ==
Walker joined South Carolina as an early enrollee and was standout in preseason practices. He posted his first sack in the second game of the season, against Towson.
