= 1994 Masters Tournament =

American golf tournament held in 1994

- Front cover of the 1994 Masters Journal

Tournament information
- Dates: April 7–10, 1994
- Location: Augusta, Georgia; 33.503°N 82.020°W
- Course: Augusta National Golf Club
- Organized by: Augusta National Golf Club
- Tour: PGA Tour

Statistics
- Par: 72
- Length: 6,925 yards (6,332 m)
- Field: 86 players, 51 after cut
- Cut: 149 (+5)
- Prize fund: US$2.0 million
- Winner's share: $360,000

Champion
- (Spain) José María Olazábal
- 279 (−9)

Location map
- Location in the United States Location in Georgia

The 1994 Masters Tournament was the 58th Masters Tournament, held April 7–10 at Augusta National Golf Club in Augusta, Georgia.

José María Olazábal won the first of his two Masters titles, two strokes ahead of runner-up Tom Lehman, and became the sixth winner from Europe in the past seven Masters. Olazábal was the second champion from Spain, following Seve Ballesteros, the winner in 1980 and 1983.

Larry Mize, the 1987 champion, led after each of the first two rounds, and Lehman assumed the 54-hole lead with one of two 69s on Saturday; Olazábal had the other and was one stroke back, with Mize one behind in third. Lehman, age 35, had yet to win on the PGA Tour.

In the final round, Olazábal, Lehman, and Mize shared the lead entering the back nine. Mize made three bogeys coming home and fell out of contention. Lehman bogeyed the par-3 12th to fall a stroke back, and at the par-5 15th hole, both Olazábal and Lehman had putts for eagle. Olazabal made his from 35 feet (11 m), but Lehman missed from fifteen (4.5 m), and the lead was two strokes.

After pars at 16, Olazábal three-putted from off the 17th green for bogey, while Lehman missed a birdie from fifteen feet, and the lead was reduced to one at the final tee. Lehman's one-iron found the left fairway bunker, the approach shot was well short of the green, and he bogeyed; Olazábal put his approach into the gallery, but he scrambled for par and had a two-stroke victory.

Fred Couples, the 1992 champion, did not enter due to back problems, withdrawing the previous Friday. Olazábal won his second green jacket five years later in 1999. Lehman won his first tour event six weeks later at the Memorial, and won a major at The Open Championship in 1996.

== Course ==
Hole	Name	Yards	Par	Hole	Name	Yards	Par
1	Tea Olive	400	4	10	Camellia	485	4
2	Pink Dogwood	555	5	11	White Dogwood	455	4
3	Flowering Peach	360	4	12	Golden Bell	155	3
4	Flowering Crab Apple	205	3	13	Azalea	485	5
5	Magnolia	435	4	14	Chinese Fir	405	4
6	Juniper	180	3	15	Firethorn	500	5
7	Pampas	360	4	16	Redbud	170	3
8	Yellow Jasmine	535	5	17	Nandina	400	4
9	Carolina Cherry	435	4	18	Holly	405	4
Out		3,465	36	In		3,460	36
Source:				Total		6,925	72

== Field ==
1. Masters champions

Tommy Aaron, Seve Ballesteros (9), Gay Brewer, Billy Casper, Charles Coody, Ben Crenshaw (12), Nick Faldo (3,11), Raymond Floyd (9,10), Doug Ford, Bernhard Langer (13), Sandy Lyle (9), Larry Mize (9,12,13), Jack Nicklaus, Arnold Palmer, Gary Player, Craig Stadler (12,13), Tom Watson (10,11), Ian Woosnam (9), Fuzzy Zoeller (9)

- Fred Couples (9,10,13) did not play due to back problems
- George Archer, Jack Burke Jr., Bob Goalby, Ben Hogan, Herman Keiser, Cary Middlecoff, Byron Nelson, Henry Picard, Gene Sarazen, Sam Snead, and Art Wall Jr. did not play.

2. U.S. Open champions (last five years)

Hale Irwin (11), Lee Janzen (13), Tom Kite (13), Payne Stewart (4,9,10,13), Curtis Strange

3. The Open champions (last five years)

Mark Calcavecchia (9,13), Ian Baker-Finch, Greg Norman (11,12,13)

4. PGA champions (last five years)

John Daly (9), Wayne Grady, Nick Price (10,12,13)

- Paul Azinger (10,12,13) did not play

5. U.S. Amateur champion and runner-up

Danny Ellis (a), John Harris (a)

6. The Amateur champion

Iain Pyman (a)

7. U.S. Amateur Public Links champion

- David Berganio Jr. forfeited his exemption by turning professional

8. U.S. Mid-Amateur champion

Jeff Thomas (a)

9. Top 24 players and ties from the 1993 Masters

Chip Beck (13), Russ Cochran, Steve Elkington (13), Brad Faxon, Anders Forsbrand, Dan Forsman, Tom Lehman, Jeff Maggert (12,13), José María Olazábal, Mark O'Meara, Corey Pavin (12,13), Scott Simpson (11,12,13), Jeff Sluman (10), Howard Twitty, Lanny Wadkins

10. Top 16 players and ties from the 1993 U.S. Open

John Adams, David Edwards (12,13), Ernie Els, Fred Funk, Nolan Henke (11,12), Scott Hoch (11,12), Barry Lane, Craig Parry, Loren Roberts (12), Mike Standly

11. Top eight players and ties from 1993 PGA Championship

John Cook, Bob Estes, Dudley Hart, Vijay Singh (12,13)

- Phil Mickelson (12,13) did not play

12. Winners of PGA Tour events since the previous Masters

Fulton Allem (13), Jim Gallagher Jr. (13), Bill Glasson, David Frost (13), Jay Haas (13), John Huston (13), John Inman, Davis Love III (13), Andrew Magee, Billy Mayfair (13), Blaine McCallister, Jim McGovern (13), Johnny Miller, Brett Ogle, Grant Waite

- Rocco Mediate (13) did not play

13. Top 30 players from the 1993 PGA Tour money list

Rick Fehr, Gil Morgan

14. Special foreign invitation

Peter Baker, Hajime Meshiai, Colin Montgomerie, Masashi Ozaki, Costantino Rocca, Sam Torrance

== Round summaries ==
=== First round ===
Thursday, April 7, 1994

Place	Player	Score	To par
1	(United States) Larry Mize	68	−4
T2	(South Africa) Fulton Allem	69	−3
T2	(United States) Tom Kite	69	−3
T4	(Spain) Seve Ballesteros	70	−2
T4	(United States) Raymond Floyd	70	−2
T4	(United States) Tom Lehman	70	−2
T4	(Australia) Greg Norman	70	−2
T4	(Fiji) Vijay Singh	70	−2
T4	(United States) Tom Watson	70	−2
T10	(Australia) Ian Baker-Finch	71	−1
T10	(United States) Chip Beck	71	−1
T10	(United States) Russ Cochran	71	−1
T10	(United States) Brad Faxon	71	−1
T10	(Japan) Hajime Meshiai	71	−1
T10	(United States) Corey Pavin	71	−1
T10	(South Africa) Gary Player	71	−1

=== Second round ===
Friday, April 8, 1994

Place	Player	Score	To par
1	(United States) Larry Mize	68-71=139	−5
T2	(United States) Dan Forsman	74-66=140	−4
T2	(United States) Tom Lehman	70-70=140	−4
T2	(Australia) Greg Norman	70-70=140	−4
T5	(South Africa) Ernie Els	74-67=141	−3
T5	(United States) Hale Irwin	73-68=141	−3
T5	(United States) Tom Kite	69-72=141	−3
T5	(Spain) José María Olazábal	74-67=141	−3
T5	(United States) Tom Watson	70-71=141	−3
T10	(Australia) Ian Baker-Finch	71-71=142	−2
T10	(United States) Chip Beck	71-71=142	−2
T10	(United States) Jim McGovern	72-70=142	−2
T10	(Japan) Hajime Meshiai	71-71=142	−2

Amateurs: Harris (+4), Ellis (+6), Thomas (+12), Pyman (+17)

=== Third round ===
Saturday, April 9, 1994

Place	Player	Score	To par
1	(United States) Tom Lehman	70-70-69=209	−7
2	(Spain) José María Olazábal	74-67-69=210	−6
3	(United States) Larry Mize	68-71-72=211	−5
4	(United States) Tom Kite	69-72-71=212	−4
T5	(Australia) Ian Baker-Finch	71-71-71=213	−3
T5	(United States) Jim McGovern	72-70-71=213	−3
7	(United States) Tom Watson	70-71-73=214	−2
T8	(South Africa) Ernie Els	74-67-74=215	−1
T8	(United States) Raymond Floyd	70-74-71=215	−1
T8	(Australia) Greg Norman	70-70-75=215	−1
T8	(United States) Loren Roberts	75-68-72=215	−1

=== Final round ===
Sunday, April 10, 1994

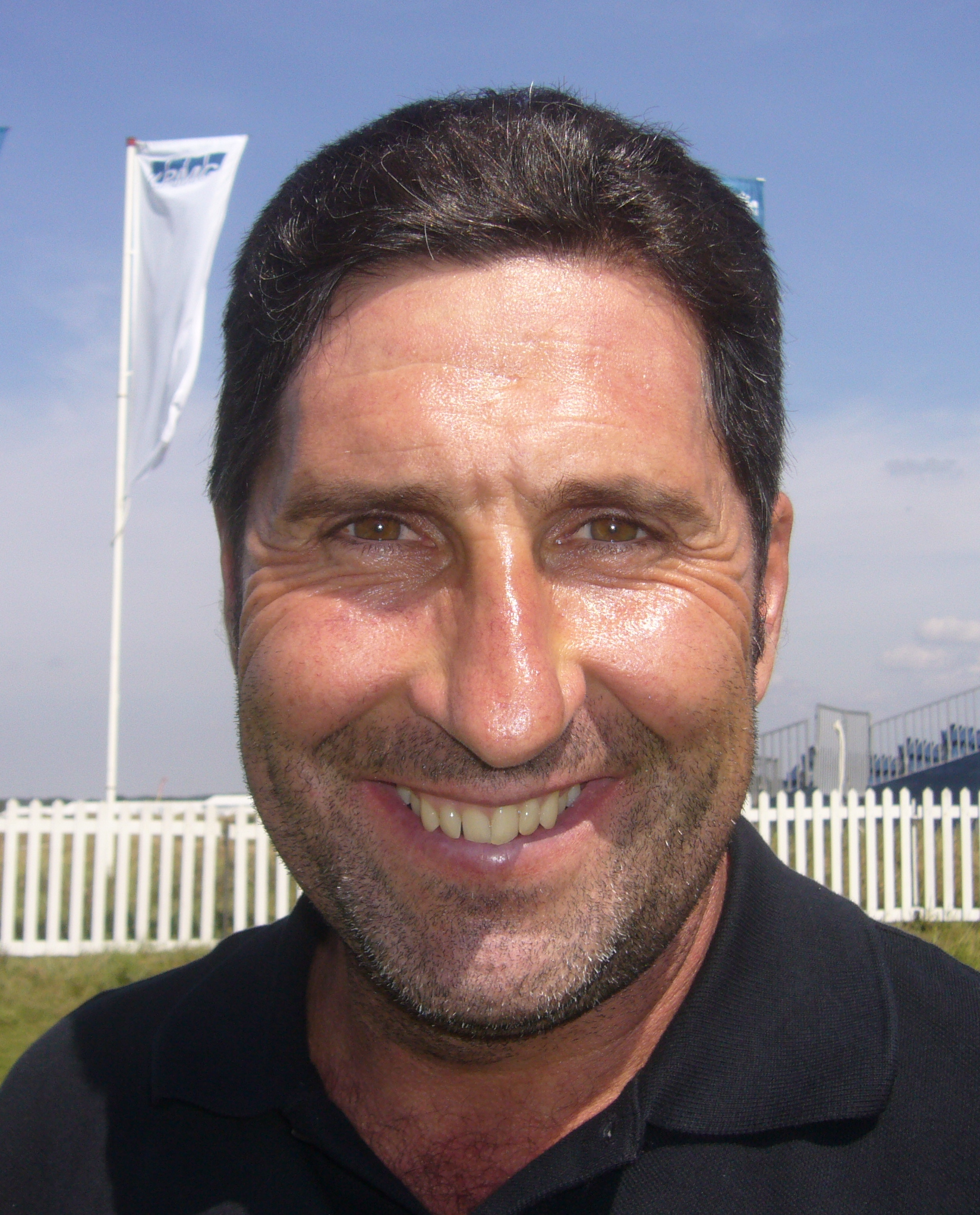
José María Olazábal won his first Masters title

==== Final leaderboard ====
Champion
Silver Cup winner (low amateur)
(a) = amateur
(c) = past champion

Top 10
Place	Player	Score	To par	Money (US$)
1	(Spain) José María Olazábal	74-67-69-69=279	−9	360,000
2	(United States) Tom Lehman	70-70-69-72=281	−7	216,000
3	(United States) Larry Mize (c)	68-71-72-71=282	−6	136,000
4	(United States) Tom Kite	69-72-71-71=283	−5	96,000
T5	(United States) Jay Haas	72-72-72-69=285	−3	73,000
T5	(United States) Jim McGovern	72-70-71-72=285	−3	73,000
T5	(United States) Loren Roberts	75-68-72-70=285	−3	73,000
T8	(South Africa) Ernie Els	74-67-74-71=286	−2	60,000
T8	(United States) Corey Pavin	71-72-73-70=286	−2	60,000
T10	(Australia) Ian Baker-Finch	71-71-71-74=287	−1	50,000
T10	(United States) Raymond Floyd (c)	70-74-71-72=287	−1	50,000
T10	(United States) John Huston	72-72-74-69=287	−1	50,000

Leaderboard below the top 10
Place	Player	Score	To par	Money ($)
13	(United States) Tom Watson (c)	70-71-73-74=288	E	42,000
14	(United States) Dan Forsman	74-66-76-73=289	+1	38,000
T15	(United States) Chip Beck	71-71-75-74=291	+3	34,000
T15	(United States) Brad Faxon	71-73-73-74=291	+3	34,000
T15	(United States) Mark O'Meara	75-70-76-70=291	+3	34,000
T18	(Spain) Seve Ballesteros (c)	70-76-75-71=292	+4	24,343
T18	(United States) Ben Crenshaw (c)	74-73-73-72=292	+4	24,343
T18	(United States) David Edwards	73-72-73-74=292	+4	24,343
T18	(United States) Bill Glasson	72-73-75-72=292	+4	24,343
T18	(United States) Hale Irwin	73-68-79-72=292	+4	24,343
T18	(Australia) Greg Norman	70-70-75-77=292	+4	24,343
T18	(United States) Lanny Wadkins	73-74-73-72=292	+4	24,343
T25	(Germany) Bernhard Langer (c)	74-74-72-73=293	+5	16,800
T25	(United States) Jeff Sluman	74-75-71-73=293	+5	16,800
T27	(United States) Scott Simpson	74-74-73-73=294	+6	14,800
T27	(Fiji) Vijay Singh	70-75-74-75=294	+6	14,800
T27	(United States) Curtis Strange	74-70-75-75=294	+6	14,800
T30	(United States) Lee Janzen	75-71-76-73=295	+7	13,300
T30	(Australia) Craig Parry	75-74-73-73=295	+7	13,300
32	(England) Nick Faldo (c)	76-73-73-74=296	+8	12,400
T33	(United States) Russ Cochran	71-74-74-78=297	+9	11,550
T33	(Scotland) Sam Torrance	76-73-74-74=297	+9	11,550
T35	(South Africa) David Frost	74-71-75-78=298	+10	10,300
T35	(Zimbabwe) Nick Price	74-73-74-77=298	+10	10,300
T35	(United States) Fuzzy Zoeller (c)	74-72-74-78=298	+10	10,300
T38	(South Africa) Fulton Allem	69-77-76-77=299	+11	9,000
T38	(United States) Fred Funk	79-70-75-75=299	+11	9,000
T38	(Scotland) Sandy Lyle (c)	75-73-78-73=299	+11	9,000
T41	(Australia) Wayne Grady	74-73-73-80=300	+12	7,400
T41	(United States) Andrew Magee	74-74-76-76=300	+12	7,400
T41	(Japan) Hajime Meshiai	71-71-80-78=300	+12	7,400
T41	(Italy) Costantino Rocca	79-70-78-73=300	+12	7,400
T41	(United States) Mike Standly	77-69-79-75=300	+12	7,400
T46	(United States) John Cook	77-72-77-75=301	+13	6,000
T46	(Wales) Ian Woosnam (c)	76-73-77-75=301	+13	6,000
T48	(United States) John Daly	76-73-77-78=304	+16	5,250
T48	(United States) Howard Twitty	73-76-74-81=304	+16	5,250
T50	(United States) John Harris (a)	72-76-80-77=305	+17	0
T50	(United States) Jeff Maggert	75-73-82-75=305	+17	5,000
CUT	(United States) Mark Calcavecchia	75-75=150	+6	
CUT	(United States) Rick Fehr	77-73=150	+6	
CUT	(United States) Nolan Henke	77-73=150	+6	
CUT	(United States) Johnny Miller	77-73=150	+6	
CUT	(Scotland) Colin Montgomerie	77-73=150	+6	
CUT	(United States) Gil Morgan	74-76=150	+6	
CUT	(Japan) Masashi Ozaki	76-74=150	+6	
CUT	(South Africa) Gary Player (c)	71-79=150	+6	
CUT	(United States) Craig Stadler (c)	76-74=150	+6	
CUT	(United States) Jim Gallagher Jr.	74-77=151	+7	
CUT	(United States) Dudley Hart	76-75=151	+7	
CUT	(United States) Billy Mayfair	74-77=151	+7	
CUT	(Australia) Brett Ogle	74-77=151	+7	
CUT	(United States) Danny Ellis (a)	78-74=152	+8	
CUT	(United States) John Inman	76-76=152	+8	
CUT	(United States) Jack Nicklaus (c)	78-74=152	+8	
CUT	(New Zealand) Grant Waite	74-78=152	+8	
CUT	(England) Peter Baker	78-75=153	+9	
CUT	(United States) Bob Estes	77-76=153	+9	
CUT	(United States) John Adams	76-78=154	+10	
CUT	(United States) Billy Casper (c)	77-77=154	+10	
CUT	(United States) Charles Coody (c)	80-74=154	+10	
CUT	(Sweden) Anders Forsbrand	80-74=154	+10	
CUT	(United States) Scott Hoch	75-79=154	+10	
CUT	(United States) Davis Love III	76-78=154	+10	
CUT	(Australia) Steve Elkington	81-74=155	+11	
CUT	(United States) Arnold Palmer (c)	78-77=155	+11	
CUT	(United States) Tommy Aaron (c)	76-80=156	+12	
CUT	(United States) Payne Stewart	78-78=156	+12	
CUT	(United States) Jeff Thomas (a)	78-78=156	+12	
CUT	(United States) Blaine McCallister	79-78=157	+13	
CUT	(England) Barry Lane	76-82=158	+14	
CUT	(England) Iain Pyman (a)	82-79=161	+17	
CUT	(United States) Gay Brewer (c)	84-79=163	+19	
WD	(United States) Doug Ford (c)			

==== Scorecard ====
Hole	1	2	3	4	5	6	7	8	9	10	11	12	13	14	15	16	17	18
Par	4	5	4	3	4	3	4	5	4	4	4	3	5	4	5	3	4	4
(Spain) Olazábal	−6	−7	−7	−7	−7	−7	−7	−8	−8	−8	−8	−8	−8	−8	−10	−10	−9	−9
(United States) Lehman	−7	−8	−8	−8	−8	−8	−8	−8	−8	−8	−8	−7	−7	−7	−8	−8	−8	−7
(United States) Mize	−5	−6	−6	−6	−5	−6	−7	−8	−8	−8	−8	−7	−8	−7	−7	−7	−7	−6
(United States) Kite	−4	−5	−5	−5	−4	−4	−4	−4	−4	−4	−4	−3	−4	−4	−5	−4	−5	−5
(United States) Haas	E	−1	−1	−1	−1	−1	−2	−3	−3	−3	−3	−3	−2	−2	−2	−3	−3	−3
(United States) McGovern	−3	−3	−1	−1	−2	+1	+1	E	−1	−1	−2	−2	−3	−3	−3	−4	−3	−3
(United States) Roberts	−1	−1	−1	−1	−1	−2	−2	−2	−2	−2	−2	E	−1	−2	−3	−3	−3	−3
(South Africa) Els	−2	−2	−2	−2	−2	−2	−2	−4	−4	−4	−4	−5	−4	−4	−3	−2	−2	−2
(United States) Pavin	+1	E	E	E	E	E	E	−1	−1	−2	−2	−1	−2	−2	−1	−1	−2	−2

Cumulative tournament scores, relative to par

Eagle	Birdie	Bogey	Double bogey	Triple bogey+
