= Dutch Fork High School =

Location
- 1400 Old Tamah Rd; Irmo, South Carolina 29063; United States; 34°9′12″N 81°12′4″W

Information
- Type: Public high school
- Motto: "Enter to Learn... Go Forth to Serve"
- Established: 1992 (34 years ago)
- School district: Lexington & Richland County School District Five
- Principal: Reed Gunter
- Staff: 117.83 (on an FTE basis)
- Grades: 9–12
- Enrollment: 1,705 (2023–2024)
- Student to teacher ratio: 14.47
- Colors: Green and silver
- Athletics conference: 5A – Region V
- Mascot: Silver Foxes
- Newspaper: The Renaissance
- Yearbook: The Legacy
- Website: dfhs.lexrich5.org

Dutch Fork High School is a school in the Lexington & Richland County School District Five, located in unincorporated Richland County, South Carolina, with an Irmo postal address.

== Notable alumni ==
- Tyler Bass, NFL kicker for the Buffalo Bills
- Wesley Bryan, American professional golfer
- Alaina Coates, professional women's basketball player
- Murphy Holloway, professional basketball player
- Jalin Hyatt, NFL wide receiver
- Dustin Johnson, professional golfer, Masters and U.S. Open champion
- TJ Shook, baseball player
- Will Taylor, baseball player
- Bryce Thompson, NFL defensive back
- Drew Williams, former NFL long snapper
- Dallas Wise, track and field Paralympian
