= Drew Williams =

American football player (born 1994)

No. 47
- Position: Long snapper

Personal information
- Born: June 17, 1994 (age 32); Irmo, South Carolina, U.S.
- Listed height: 6 ft 3 in (1.91 m)
- Listed weight: 190 lb (86 kg)

Career information
- High school: Dutch Fork (Irmo, South Carolina)
- College: South Carolina
- NFL draft: 2017: undrafted

Career history
- Arizona Cardinals (2018)*
- * Offseason or practice squad member only
- Stats at Pro Football Reference

Charles Andrew Williams (born June 17, 1994) is an American former football long snapper. He played college football at South Carolina.

== College career ==
Williams started as a true freshman for the Gamecocks and played every game.

== Professional career ==
On January 2, 2018, Williams signed a reserve/future contract with the Arizona Cardinals. He was waived on May 1, 2018.
