= Open Mediterrania =

Tournament information
- Location: Valencia, Spain
- Established: 1990
- Course: Club de Golf Escorpión
- Par: 72
- Tour: European Tour
- Format: Stroke play
- Prize fund: £300,000
- Month played: February
- Final year: 1995

Tournament record score
- Aggregate: 276 José María Olazábal (1992); 276 Paul McGinley (1994); 276 José María Olazábal (1994); 276 Robert Karlsson (1995)
- To par: −12 as above

Final champion
- (Sweden) Robert Karlsson
- Location in Spain Location in the Community of Valencia

The Open Mediterrania was a golf tournament on the European Tour, which was played at several different venues in Spain and France from 1990 to 1995. It had four different names in six years.

Major championship winners Ian Woosnam and José María Olazábal each claimed the Open Mediterrania title twice, while in 1995, future Ryder Cup star, Sergio García, became the then youngest player to make the cut in a European Tour event. The prize fund was £400,000 for each of the first four years before being cut to £300,000 for each of the final two years. In 1990 it was one of the highest on the European Tour, but by 1995 it was well below average.

== Winners ==
Year	Winner	Score	To par	Margin of victory	Runner(s)-up
Turespaña Open Mediterrania
1996	Cancelled				
1995	(Sweden) Robert Karlsson	276	−12	3 strokes	(Sweden) Anders Forsbrand (Spain) Miguel Ángel Jiménez (Sweden) Jarmo Sandelin (Scotland) Sam Torrance
1994	(Spain) José María Olazábal (2)	276	−12	Playoff	(Republic of Ireland) Paul McGinley
1993	(New Zealand) Frank Nobilo	279	−9	1 stroke	(Scotland) Gordon Brand Jnr (Northern Ireland) David Feherty
Open Mediterrania
1992	(Spain) José María Olazábal	276	−12	2 strokes	(Spain) José Rivero
Fujitsu Mediterranean Open
1991	(Wales) Ian Woosnam (2)	279	−5	1 stroke	(England) Michael McLean
Amex Med Open
1990	(Wales) Ian Woosnam	210 (Note: Shortened to 54 holes due to rain.)	−6	2 strokes	(Spain) Miguel Ángel Martín (Argentina) Eduardo Romero
