= 1999 Masters Tournament =

American golf tournament held in 1999

- Front cover of the 1999 Masters Journal

Tournament information
- Dates: April 8–11, 1999
- Location: Augusta, Georgia; 33.503°N 82.020°W
- Course: Augusta National Golf Club
- Organized by: Augusta National Golf Club
- Tours: PGA Tour; European Tour; Japan Golf Tour

Statistics
- Par: 72
- Length: 6,985 yards (6,387 m)
- Field: 96 players, 56 after cut
- Cut: 148 (+4)
- Prize fund: US$4,000,000
- Winner's share: $720,000

Champion
- (Spain) José María Olazábal
- 280 (−8)

Location map
- Location in the United States Location in Georgia

The 1999 Masters Tournament was the 63rd Masters Tournament, held from April 8–11 at Augusta National Golf Club in Augusta, Georgia. José María Olazábal won his second Masters championship, two strokes ahead of runner-up Davis Love III and three strokes ahead of Greg Norman, who experienced another disappointing back nine at Augusta.

== Course ==
| Hole | Name | Yards | Par | Hole | Name | Yards | Par |
|---|---|---|---|---|---|---|---|
| 1 | Tea Olive | 410 | 4 | 10 | Camellia | 485 | 4 |
| 2 | Pink Dogwood | 575 | 5 | 11 | White Dogwood | 455 | 4 |
| 3 | Flowering Peach | 350 | 4 | 12 | Golden Bell | 155 | 3 |
| 4 | Flowering Crab Apple | 205 | 3 | 13 | Azalea | 485 | 5 |
| 5 | Magnolia | 435 | 4 | 14 | Chinese Fir | 405 | 4 |
| 6 | Juniper | 180 | 3 | 15 | Firethorn | 500 | 5 |
| 7 | Pampas | 365 | 4 | 16 | Redbud | 170 | 3 |
| 8 | Yellow Jasmine | 550 | 5 | 17 | Nandina | 425 | 4 |
| 9 | Carolina Cherry | 430 | 4 | 18 | Holly | 405 | 4 |
| Out | | 3,500 | 36 | In | | 3,485 | 36 |
| Source: | | | | Total | | 6,985 | 72 |

== Field ==
1. Masters champions

Tommy Aaron, Seve Ballesteros, Gay Brewer, Billy Casper, Charles Coody, Fred Couples (10,13,14,15,16), Ben Crenshaw, Nick Faldo, Raymond Floyd, Doug Ford, Bernhard Langer (15,16), Sandy Lyle, Larry Mize, José María Olazábal (10,15,16), Mark O'Meara (3,12,14,15,16), Arnold Palmer, Gary Player, Craig Stadler, Tom Watson (13,14,15,16), Tiger Woods (10,13,14,15,16), Ian Woosnam (10,15), Fuzzy Zoeller

- George Archer, Jack Burke Jr., Bob Goalby, Herman Keiser, Byron Nelson, Jack Nicklaus (10), Gene Sarazen, Sam Snead, and Art Wall Jr. did not play.

2. U.S. Open champions (last five years)

Ernie Els (10,13,15,16), Lee Janzen (14,15,16), Steve Jones (13,15), Corey Pavin

3. The Open champions (last five years)

John Daly, Tom Lehman (11,14,15,16), Justin Leonard (5,10,14,15,16), Nick Price (4,11,12,13,14,15,16)

4. PGA champions (last five years)

Mark Brooks, Steve Elkington (5,12,13,15,16), Davis Love III (12,13,14,15,16), Vijay Singh (13,14,15,16)

5. The Players Championship winners (last three years)

David Duval (10,11,13,14,15,16)

6. U.S. Amateur champion and runner-up

Hank Kuehne (a), Tom McKnight (a)

7. The Amateur champion

Sergio García (a)

8. U.S. Amateur Public Links champion

Trevor Immelman (a)

9. U.S. Mid-Amateur champion

Spider Miller (a)

10. Top 24 players and ties from the 1998 Masters

Paul Azinger (11), Mark Calcavecchia (14,15,16), Stewart Cink (11,15,16), Darren Clarke (15,16), Jim Furyk (11,13,14,15,16), Jay Haas, Scott Hoch (14,15,16), John Huston (13,14,15,16), Per-Ulrik Johansson, Matt Kuchar (a) (11), Jeff Maggert (11,13,14,15,16), Scott McCarron, Phil Mickelson (11,13,14,15,16), Colin Montgomerie (15,16), David Toms, Willie Wood

11. Top 16 players and ties from the 1998 U.S. Open

Stuart Appleby (13,15,16), Jesper Parnevik (14,15,16), Jeff Sluman (13,14,15,16), Payne Stewart (13,14,15,16), Steve Stricker (12,14,15,16), Bob Tway (14,15,16), Lee Westwood (15,16)

12. Top eight players and ties from 1998 PGA Championship

Frank Lickliter, Billy Mayfair (13,14,15,16)

13. Winners of PGA Tour events since the previous Masters

Billy Andrade, Olin Browne, Brandel Chamblee, John Cook (14,15,16), Trevor Dodds, Joe Durant, Fred Funk (14,16), J. P. Hayes, Tim Herron, Gabriel Hjertstedt, Rocco Mediate, Steve Pate, Chris Perry, Hal Sutton (14,15,16)

14. Top 30 players from the 1998 PGA Tour money list

Glen Day (15,16), Bob Estes (15,16), Andrew Magee (15,16), Scott Verplank (15,16)

15. Top 50 players from the final 1998 world ranking

Thomas Bjørn (16), Brad Faxon (16), Carlos Franco (16), Bill Glasson (16), Brandt Jobe (16), Shigeki Maruyama (16), Greg Norman (16), Masashi Ozaki (16), Loren Roberts (16), Brian Watts (16)

16. Top 50 players from world ranking published March 7

Craig Parry

17. Special foreign invitation

Miguel Ángel Jiménez, Patrik Sjöland

All the amateurs except Matt Kuchar and John Miller were playing in their first Masters, as were Thomas Bjørn, Brandel Chamblee, Glen Day, Trevor Dodds, Joe Durant, Carlos Franco, J. P. Hayes, Brandt Jobe, Frank Lickliter, Patrik Sjöland and Brian Watts.

== Round summaries ==
=== First round ===
Thursday, April 8, 1999 & Friday, April 9, 1999

The first round was suspended by darkness due to earlier rain delays and completed on the following day.

| Place | Player | Score | To par |
|---|---|---|---|
| T1 | (United States) Brandel Chamblee | 69 | −3 |
| T1 | (United States) Davis Love III | 69 | −3 |
| T1 | (United States) Scott McCarron | 69 | −3 |
| T1 | (Zimbabwe) Nick Price | 69 | −3 |
| T5 | (United States) Lee Janzen | 70 | −2 |
| T5 | (United States) Justin Leonard | 70 | −2 |
| T5 | (United States) Andrew Magee | 70 | −2 |
| T5 | (Scotland) Colin Montgomerie | 70 | −2 |
| T5 | (Spain) José María Olazábal | 70 | −2 |
| T5 | (United States) Mark O'Meara | 70 | −2 |
| T5 | (United States) Jeff Sluman | 70 | −2 |

=== Second round ===
Friday, April 9, 1999

| Place | Player | Score | To par |
|---|---|---|---|
| 1 | (Spain) José María Olazábal | 70-66=136 | −8 |
| 2 | (United States) Scott McCarron | 69-68=137 | −7 |
| T3 | (United States) Lee Janzen | 70-69=139 | −5 |
| T3 | (Australia) Greg Norman | 71-68=139 | −5 |
| T5 | (United States) Davis Love III | 69-72=141 | −3 |
| T5 | (Zimbabwe) Nick Price | 69-72=141 | −3 |
| T7 | (United States) Brandel Chamblee | 69-73=142 | −2 |
| T7 | (Australia) Steve Elkington | 72-70=142 | −2 |
| T7 | (United States) Bill Glasson | 72-70=142 | −2 |
| T7 | (United States) Justin Leonard | 70-72=142 | −2 |
| T7 | (Germany) Bernhard Langer | 76-66=142 | −2 |
| T7 | (Scotland) Colin Montgomerie | 70-72=142 | −2 |

Amateurs: García (+3), McKnight (+3), Immelman (+4), Kuchar (+4), Kuehne (+8), Miller (+18).

=== Third round ===
Saturday, April 10, 1999

| Place | Player | Score | To par |
|---|---|---|---|
| 1 | (Spain) José María Olazábal | 70-66-73=209 | −7 |
| 2 | (Australia) Greg Norman | 71-68-71=210 | −6 |
| T3 | (United States) Davis Love III | 69-72-70=211 | −5 |
| T3 | (United States) Steve Pate | 71-75-65=211 | −5 |
| T5 | (South Africa) Ernie Els | 71-72-69=212 | −4 |
| T5 | (United States) Bob Estes | 71-72-69=212 | −4 |
| T5 | (Paraguay) Carlos Franco | 72-72-68=212 | −4 |
| T5 | (United States) Lee Janzen | 70-69-73=212 | −4 |
| T9 | (Australia) Steve Elkington | 72-70-71=213 | −3 |
| T9 | (United States) Scott McCarron | 69-68-76=213 | −3 |
| T9 | (Scotland) Colin Montgomerie | 70-72-71=213 | −3 |
| T9 | (Zimbabwe) Nick Price | 69-72-72=213 | −3 |

=== Final round ===
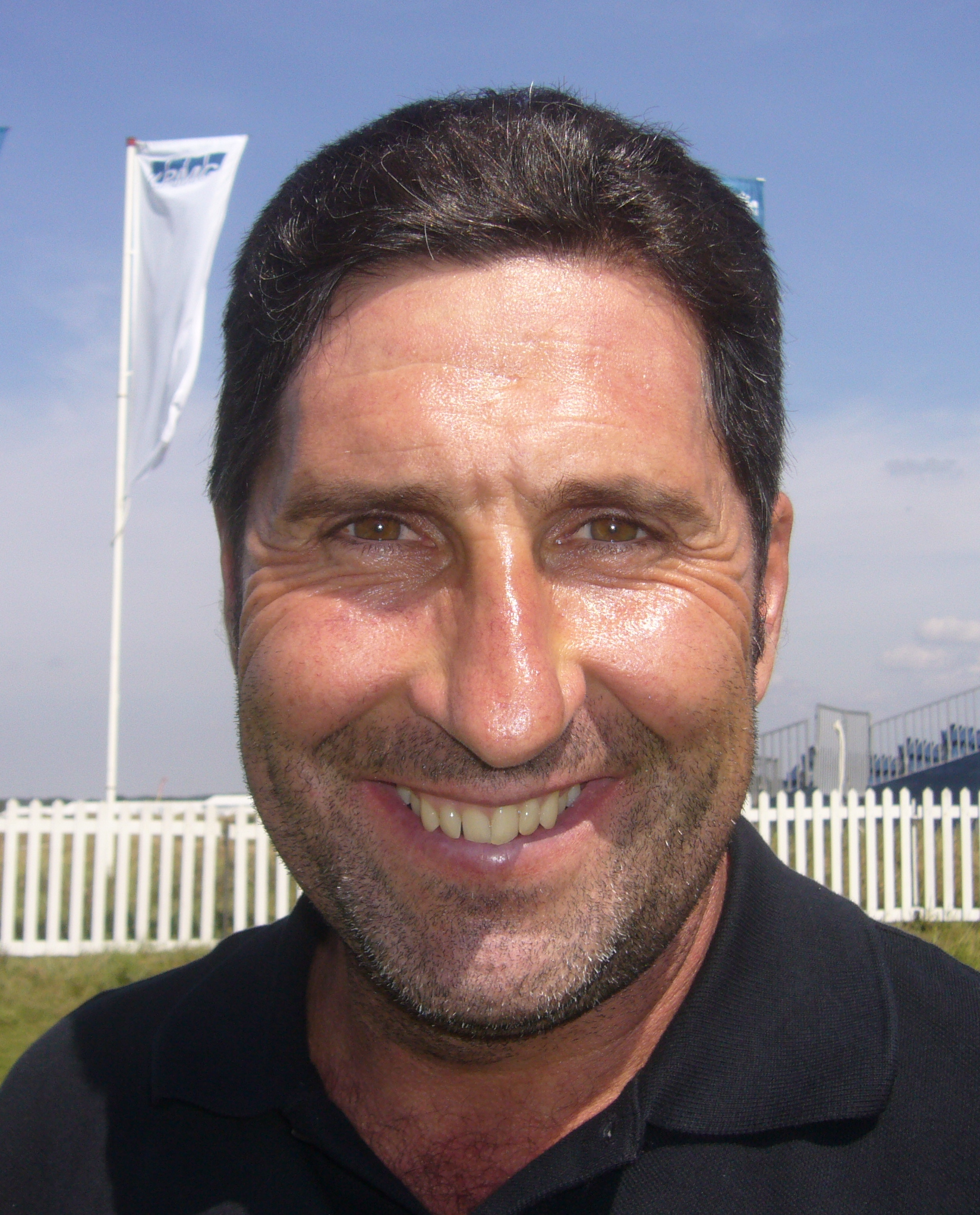
José María Olazábal won his second Masters title

External videos
- Full final round coverage on CBS on YouTube

Sunday, April 11, 1999

==== Final leaderboard ====
Champion
Silver Cup winner (low amateur)
(a) = amateur
(c) = past champion

Top 10
| Place | Player | Score | To par | Money (US$) |
|---|---|---|---|---|
| 1 | (Spain) José María Olazábal (c) | 70-66-73-71=280 | −8 | 720,000 |
| 2 | (United States) Davis Love III | 69-72-70-71=282 | −6 | 432,000 |
| 3 | (Australia) Greg Norman | 71-68-71-73=283 | −5 | 272,000 |
| T4 | (United States) Bob Estes | 71-72-69-72=284 | −4 | 176,000 |
| T4 | (United States) Steve Pate | 71-75-65-73=284 | −4 | 176,000 |
| T6 | (United States) David Duval | 71-74-70-70=285 | −3 | 125,200 |
| T6 | (Paraguay) Carlos Franco | 72-72-68-73=285 | −3 | 125,200 |
| T6 | (United States) Phil Mickelson | 74-69-71-71=285 | −3 | 125,200 |
| T6 | (Zimbabwe) Nick Price | 69-72-72-72=285 | −3 | 125,200 |
| T6 | (England) Lee Westwood | 75-71-68-71=285 | −3 | 125,200 |

Leaderboard below the top 10
| Place | Player | Score | To par | Money ($) |
|---|---|---|---|---|
| T11 | (Australia) Steve Elkington | 72-70-71-74=287 | −1 | 92,000 |
| T11 | (Germany) Bernhard Langer (c) | 76-66-72-73=287 | −1 | 92,000 |
| T11 | (Scotland) Colin Montgomerie | 70-72-71-74=287 | −1 | 92,000 |
| T14 | (United States) Jim Furyk | 72-73-70-73=288 | E | 70,000 |
| T14 | (United States) Lee Janzen | 70-69-73-76=288 | E | 70,000 |
| T14 | (United States) Brandt Jobe | 72-71-74-71=288 | E | 70,000 |
| T14 | (Wales) Ian Woosnam (c) | 71-74-71-72=288 | E | 70,000 |
| T18 | (United States) Brandel Chamblee | 69-73-75-72=289 | +1 | 52,160 |
| T18 | (United States) Bill Glasson | 72-70-73-74=289 | +1 | 52,160 |
| T18 | (United States) Justin Leonard | 70-72-73-74=289 | +1 | 52,160 |
| T18 | (United States) Scott McCarron | 69-68-76-76=289 | +1 | 52,160 |
| T18 | (United States) Tiger Woods (c) | 72-72-70-75=289 | +1 | 52,160 |
| 23 | (United States) Larry Mize (c) | 76-70-72-72=290 | +2 | 41,600 |
| T24 | (United States) Brad Faxon | 74-73-68-76=291 | +3 | 35,200 |
| T24 | (Sweden) Per-Ulrik Johansson | 75-72-71-73=291 | +3 | 35,200 |
| T24 | (Fiji) Vijay Singh | 72-76-71-72=291 | +3 | 35,200 |
| T27 | (United States) Stewart Cink | 74-70-71-77=292 | +4 | 29,000 |
| T27 | (United States) Fred Couples (c) | 74-71-76-71=292 | +4 | 29,000 |
| T27 | (South Africa) Ernie Els | 71-72-69-80=292 | +4 | 29,000 |
| T27 | (United States) Rocco Mediate | 73-74-69-76=292 | +4 | 29,000 |
| T31 | (United States) Tom Lehman | 73-72-73-75=293 | +5 | 23,720 |
| T31 | (Japan) Shigeki Maruyama | 78-70-71-74=293 | +5 | 23,720 |
| T31 | (United States) Mark O'Meara (c) | 70-76-69-78=293 | +5 | 23,720 |
| T31 | (United States) Jeff Sluman | 70-75-70-78=293 | +5 | 23,720 |
| T31 | (United States) Brian Watts | 73-73-70-77=293 | +5 | 23,720 |
| T36 | (United States) John Huston | 74-72-71-77=294 | +6 | 20,100 |
| T36 | (United States) Andrew Magee | 70-77-72-75=294 | +6 | 20,100 |
| T38 | (United States) Billy Andrade | 76-72-72-75=295 | +7 | 17,200 |
| T38 | (United States) Mark Brooks | 76-72-75-72=295 | +7 | 17,200 |
| T38 | (United States) Raymond Floyd (c) | 74-73-72-76=295 | +7 | 17,200 |
| T38 | (Spain) Sergio García (a) | 72-75-75-73=295 | +7 | 0 |
| T38 | (United States) Craig Stadler (c) | 72-76-70-77=295 | +7 | 17,200 |
| T38 | (United States) Steve Stricker | 75-72-69-79=295 | +7 | 17,200 |
| T44 | (United States) Jay Haas | 74-69-79-75=297 | +9 | 14,000 |
| T44 | (United States) Tim Herron | 75-69-74-79=297 | +9 | 14,000 |
| T44 | (United States) Scott Hoch | 75-73-70-79=297 | +9 | 14,000 |
| T44 | (United States) Tom McKnight (a) | 73-74-73-77=297 | +9 | 0 |
| T48 | (Scotland) Sandy Lyle (c) | 71-77-70-80=298 | +10 | 12,000 |
| T48 | (Australia) Craig Parry | 75-73-73-77=298 | +10 | 12,000 |
| T50 | (United States) Matt Kuchar (a) | 77-71-73-78=299 | +11 | 0 |
| T50 | (United States) Chris Perry | 73-72-74-80=299 | +11 | 10,960 |
| T52 | (United States) Olin Browne | 74-74-72-80=300 | +12 | 9,980 |
| T52 | (United States) John Daly | 72-76-71-81=300 | +12 | 9,980 |
| T52 | (United States) Payne Stewart | 73-75-77-75=300 | +12 | 9,980 |
| T52 | (United States) Bob Tway | 75-73-78-74=300 | +12 | 9,980 |
| 56 | (South Africa) Trevor Immelman (a) | 72-76-78-79=305 | +17 | 0 |
| CUT | (Denmark) Thomas Bjørn | 76-73=149 | +5 | |
| CUT | (United States) Fred Funk | 76-73=149 | +5 | |
| CUT | (Spain) Miguel Ángel Jiménez | 72-77=149 | +5 | |
| CUT | (United States) Frank Lickliter | 72-77=149 | +5 | |
| CUT | (United States) Fuzzy Zoeller (c) | 72-77=149 | +5 | |
| CUT | (Australia) Stuart Appleby | 73-77=150 | +6 | |
| CUT | (United States) John Cook | 76-74=150 | +6 | |
| CUT | (United States) J. P. Hayes | 76-74=150 | +6 | |
| CUT | (Japan) Masashi Ozaki | 71-79=150 | +6 | |
| CUT | (United States) Charles Coody (c) | 77-74=151 | +7 | |
| CUT | (Sweden) Jesper Parnevik | 74-77=151 | +7 | |
| CUT | (Sweden) Patrik Sjöland | 76-75=151 | +7 | |
| CUT | (United States) Tom Watson (c) | 74-77=151 | +7 | |
| CUT | (United States) Willie Wood | 79-72=151 | +7 | |
| CUT | (United States) Paul Azinger | 74-78=152 | +8 | |
| CUT | (United States) Mark Calcavecchia | 75-77=152 | +8 | |
| CUT | (Sweden) Gabriel Hjertstedt | 74-78=152 | +8 | |
| CUT | (United States) Hank Kuehne (a) | 74-78=152 | +8 | |
| CUT | (United States) Loren Roberts | 76-76=152 | +8 | |
| CUT | (Northern Ireland) Darren Clarke | 75-78=153 | +9 | |
| CUT | (United States) Ben Crenshaw (c) | 74-79=153 | +9 | |
| CUT | (England) Nick Faldo (c) | 80-73=153 | +9 | |
| CUT | (United States) Billy Mayfair | 78-75=153 | +9 | |
| CUT | (United States) Corey Pavin | 75-78=153 | +9 | |
| CUT | (United States) Jeff Maggert | 78-76=154 | +10 | |
| CUT | (United States) David Toms | 78-76=154 | +10 | |
| CUT | (United States) Scott Verplank | 78-76=154 | +10 | |
| CUT | (United States) Glen Day | 78-77=155 | +11 | |
| CUT | (Namibia) Trevor Dodds | 78-77=155 | +11 | |
| CUT | (United States) Hal Sutton | 79-76=155 | +11 | |
| CUT | (Spain) Seve Ballesteros (c) | 78-78=156 | +12 | |
| CUT | (United States) Steve Jones | 77-79=156 | +12 | |
| CUT | (South Africa) Gary Player (c) | 79-79=158 | +14 | |
| CUT | (United States) Tommy Aaron (c) | 77-82=159 | +15 | |
| CUT | (United States) Arnold Palmer (c) | 83-78=161 | +17 | |
| CUT | (United States) Spider Miller (a) | 81-81=162 | +18 | |
| CUT | (United States) Joe Durant | 87-79=166 | +22 | |
| WD | (United States) Gay Brewer (c) | 80 | +8 | |
| WD | (United States) Billy Casper (c) | 86 | +14 | |
| WD | (United States) Doug Ford (c) | 88 | +16 | |

==== Scorecard ====
Final round

| Hole | 1 | 2 | 3 | 4 | 5 | 6 | 7 | 8 | 9 | 10 | 11 | 12 | 13 | 14 | 15 | 16 | 17 | 18 |
|---|---|---|---|---|---|---|---|---|---|---|---|---|---|---|---|---|---|---|
| Par | 4 | 5 | 4 | 3 | 4 | 3 | 4 | 5 | 4 | 4 | 4 | 3 | 5 | 4 | 5 | 3 | 4 | 4 |
| (Spain) Olazábal | −7 | −7 | −6 | −5 | −4 | −5 | −5 | −5 | −5 | −6 | −6 | −6 | −7 | −7 | −7 | −8 | −8 | −8 |
| (United States) Love III | −5 | −5 | −4 | −3 | −3 | −3 | −4 | −4 | −5 | −5 | −5 | −5 | −5 | −5 | −5 | −6 | −6 | −6 |
| (Australia) Norman | −6 | −6 | −5 | −5 | −4 | −4 | −4 | −5 | −5 | −5 | −6 | −5 | −7 | −6 | −5 | −5 | −5 | −5 |
| (United States) Estes | −4 | −4 | −3 | −3 | −3 | −3 | −3 | −4 | −5 | −5 | −4 | −4 | −4 | −4 | −4 | −4 | −4 | −4 |
| (United States) Pate | −5 | −5 | −5 | −5 | −5 | −5 | −5 | −5 | −5 | −5 | −4 | −4 | −5 | −5 | −6 | −5 | −4 | −4 |
| (United States) Duval | −1 | −3 | −2 | −2 | −2 | −2 | −3 | −4 | −4 | −5 | −3 | −3 | −4 | −3 | −4 | −3 | −2 | −3 |
| (Paraguay) Franco | −3 | −4 | −4 | −4 | −3 | −3 | −3 | −3 | −3 | −3 | −3 | −2 | −3 | −2 | −3 | −3 | −3 | −3 |
| (United States) Mickelson | −2 | −1 | E | E | +2 | +2 | +1 | E | −1 | −1 | E | +1 | −1 | −1 | −2 | −2 | −2 | −3 |
| (Zimbabwe) Price | −4 | −4 | −3 | −3 | −3 | −2 | −3 | −3 | −2 | −2 | −2 | −2 | −2 | −3 | −3 | −3 | −3 | −3 |
| (England) Westwood | −2 | −3 | −2 | −3 | −4 | −4 | −5 | −5 | −5 | −4 | −2 | −1 | −2 | −2 | −3 | −3 | −3 | −3 |

Cumulative tournament scores, relative to par

| Eagle | Birdie | Bogey | Double bogey |
