= José María Olazábal =

Spanish professional golfer (born 1966)

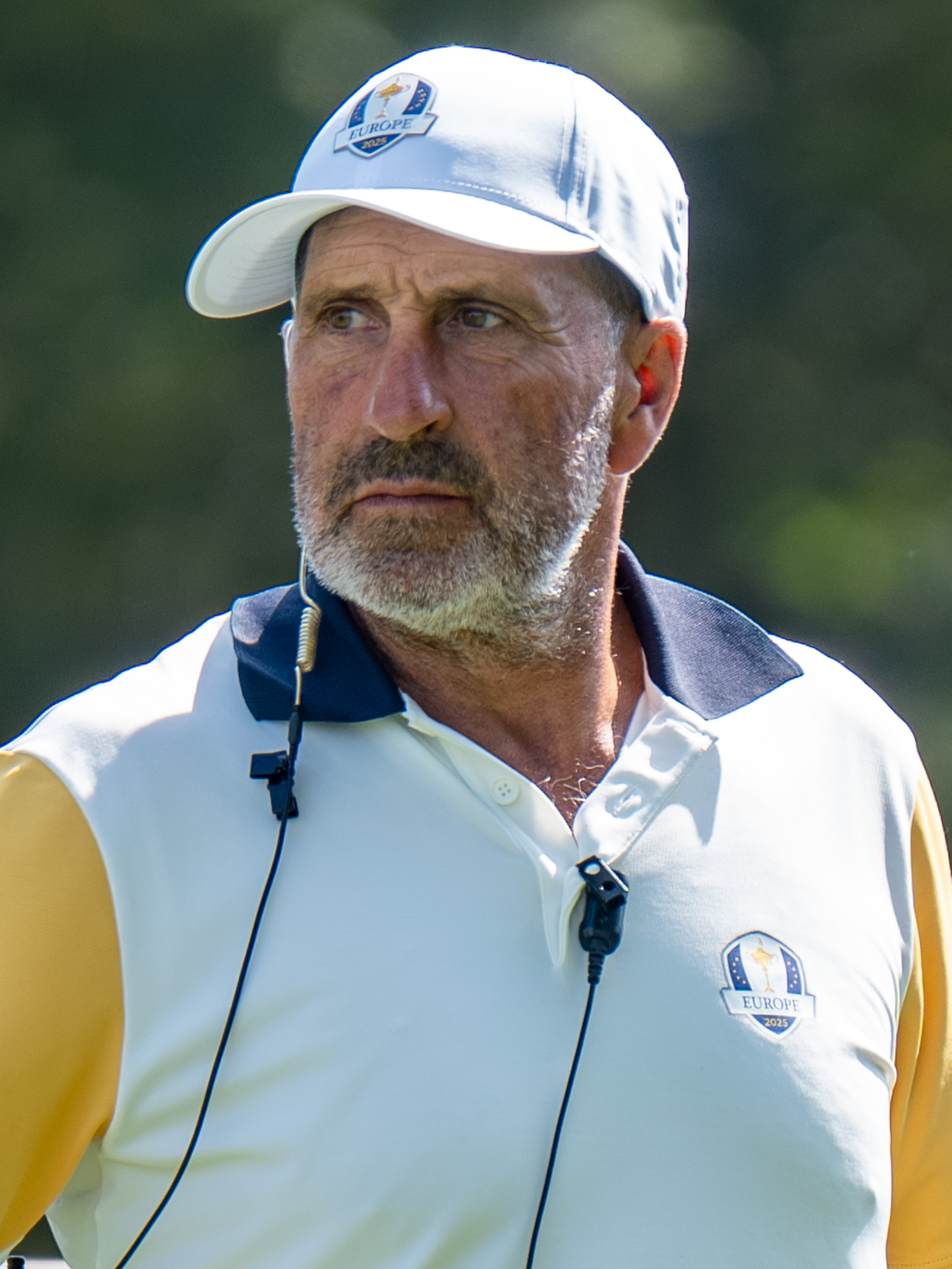
- Olazábal at the 2025 Ryder Cup

Personal information
- Full name: José María Olazábal Manterola
- Nicknames: Ollie, Txema
- Nationality: Spain
- Born: 5 February 1966 (age 60) Hondarribia, Basque Country, Spain
- Height: 5 ft 10 in (1.78 m)
- Weight: 160 lb (73 kg; 11 st)

Career
- Sport: Golf
- Turned professional: 1985
- Current tours: PGA Tour Champions; European Senior Tour; PGA Tour; European Tour
- Professional wins: 30
- Highest ranking: 2 (17 March 1991)

Number of wins by tour
- PGA Tour: 6
- European Tour: 23 (9th all time)
- Japan Golf Tour: 2
- Asian Tour: 1
- Other: 1

Best results in major championships (wins: 2)
- Masters Tournament: Won: 1994, 1999
- PGA Championship: T4: 2000
- U.S. Open: T8: 1990, 1991
- The Open Championship: 3rd/T3: 1992, 2005

Achievements and awards
- World Golf Hall of Fame: 2009 (member page)
- Sir Henry Cotton Rookie of the Year: 1986
- Prince of Asturias Award: 2013

José María Olazábal Manterola (Spanish pronunciation: [xoˈse maˈɾia olaˈθaβal manteˈɾola], Basque: [olas̻abal]; born 5 February 1966) is a Spanish professional golfer from the Basque Country, Spain who has enjoyed success on both the European Tour and the PGA Tour. He has won 30 professional tournaments, including two major championships, both the 1994 and 1999 Masters Tournaments.

Olazábal played for Europe in seven Ryder Cups from 1987 to 2006. He also served as captain at the 2012 Ryder Cup, where the European team overcame a 10–6 deficit to win 14½–13½.

== Early life ==
Olazábal was born in Hondarribia, a town in the Basque Country of Spain, the day after the golf course Real Golf Club de San Sebastian opened next to his family's home. His father Gaspar succeeded his grandfather as greenskeeper at the golf club, where his mother also worked. Olazábal began to hit golf balls at age 2 with a shortened club, and at age 6 he could practice on the course in late afternoons.

== Amateur career ==
As an amateur, he represented Spain on all levels. He represented Spain in competing in the Eisenhower Trophy at 16 years of age in 1982, and again two years later, in 1984.

In 1983, he won the Boys Amateur Championship at Glenbervie Golf Club, Scotland, and in 1984, he won The Amateur Championship at Formby Golf Club, Liverpool, England, at age 18, beating Colin Montgomerie 5 and 4 in the final. The year after, when he won the British Youths Open Amateur Championship, at Ganton Golf Club, England, he became the first player to have won the British Boy's, Youth's and Amateur titles in a career.

At the 1985 European Amateur Team Championship in Halmstad, Sweden, Olazabal made a hole-in-one at the 13th hole on his way to winning 3 and 2 against Colin Montgomerie in the semi-final between Spain and Scotland. However, Scotland went on to win the team tournament.

The month before his British Youths title, Olazábal, finished tied 25th and low amateur at the 1985 Open Championship in tough conditions at Royal St George's Golf Club in Sandwich, England.

== Professional career ==
In his rookie professional season of 1986, he finished second on the European Tour Order of Merit aged 20. In his first nine seasons, he finished in the top 10 seven times, including another second place in 1989. He was unable to play in 1996 due to a foot injury but he recovered and recorded further top 10 placings in the Order of Merit in 1997, 1999 and 2000.

He has won 23 career titles on the European Tour, which is ninth best all-time.

He was in the world top 10 for over 300 weeks between 1989 and 1995. Had Olazábal beaten Ian Woosnam at the 1991 Masters Tournament (he finished second) he would have become the World No. 1.

In 1990, Olazábal made, at the time, a rare visit to the PGA Tour, invited in a limited field to the NEC World Series of Golf at Firestone Country Club in Akron, Ohio. He opened with a course record 61, continued with aggregate course and tournament records after every round and finished with an 18-under 262 total, 12 strokes ahead of second placed Lanny Wadkins. After congratulating Olazábal, Wadkins joked that he wished Olazábal back to Europe immediately.

Both of Olazábal's majors have come in the United States, namely The Masters in 1994 and 1999. These wins make him one of only two winners of the Amateur Championship since World War II to have gone on to win a professional major. He has been highly placed in The Masters on a number of other occasions. Olazábal shares the record for the lowest round in the PGA Championship (63), which he accomplished in the third round at Valhalla Golf Club in 2000.

In 2001, Olazábal began to play on the PGA Tour, while also retaining his membership of the European Tour. He had a solid year on the PGA Tour in 2002, when he won nearly $2 million and came 24th on the money list, but has not duplicated the success he enjoyed in Europe in the 1980s and 1990s. He has six career PGA Tour titles, five of them won before he became a full member of the Tour. In 2006, he made a return to the top 15 of the world rankings.

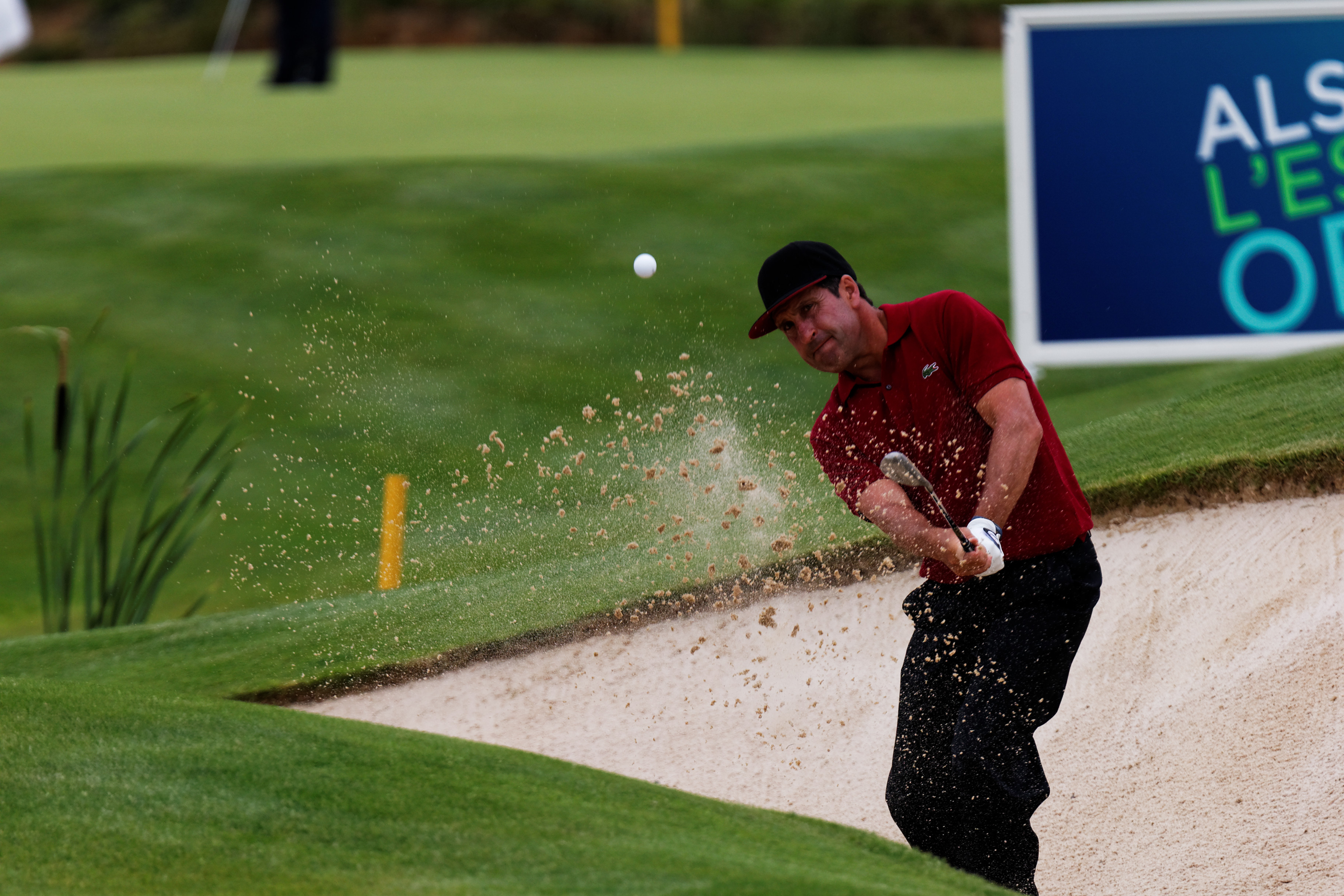
José María Olazábal (in the bunker)

Olazábal was a member of Europe's Ryder Cup team seven times from 1987 to 2006. He formed a famous partnership with fellow Spaniard Seve Ballesteros that spanned many years, and formed a similarly successful partnership with Sergio García in 2006.

Olazábal captained the European team at the 2012 Ryder Cup for the defence of the trophy at Medinah Country Club in Illinois. After his team went down 10–4 during the second day and 10–6 going into the last day, he helped engineer the greatest ever Ryder Cup comeback with the European team eventually winning by 14½ points to 13½. Olazábal was very emotional with the win, saying in an interview that that was his number one happiest golf moment and happiest moment of his life. The win was inspired by his late friend Seve Ballesteros, to whom he dedicated the win. He confirmed afterwards that he would not consider himself for captaincy in the next Ryder Cup.

Olazábal holds the world record distance for a completed putt. During the 1999 European Ryder Cup team's Concorde flight to the United States, he holed a putt which travelled the full length of the cabin. The ball was in motion for 26.17s, during which time the Concorde, at 1,270 mph, traveled 9.232 miles, beating U.S. golfer Brad Faxon's previous record of 8.5 miles, set in 1997.

== Awards and honors ==
- In 2009, Olazábal was elected to the World Golf Hall of Fame in 2009 with 56% of the vote on the international ballot.
- On 19 June 2013, Olazábal was presented with Spain's most prestigious sporting honor, the Prince of Asturias Award in recognition of his accomplishments as a player and leader of the 2012 Ryder Cup team. He is only the second golfer to be honored since the awards were launched in 1987; Seve Ballesteros was honored in 1989.

== Amateur wins ==
- 1982 Spanish Amateur Closed Championship
- 1983 Italian Open Amateur Championship, Biarritz Cup, Spanish International Amateur Championship, Boys Amateur Championship, Spanish Amateur Closed Championship
- 1984 The Amateur Championship, Belgian International Youths Championship, Spanish International Amateur Championship
- 1985 British Youths Open Amateur Championship

== Professional wins (30) ==
=== PGA Tour wins (6) ===
Legend
Major championships (2)
Other PGA Tour (4)

| No. | Date | Tournament | Winning score | Margin of victory | Runner(s)-up |
|---|---|---|---|---|---|
| 1 | 26 Aug 1990 | NEC World Series of Golf | −18 (61-67-67-67=262) | 12 strokes | (United States) Lanny Wadkins |
| 2 | 18 Aug 1991 | The International | 10 pts (5-6-8-10=10) | 3 points | (Australia) Ian Baker-Finch, (United States) Scott Gump, (United States) Bob Lohr |
| 3 | 10 Apr 1994 | Masters Tournament | −9 (74-67-69-69=279) | 2 strokes | (United States) Tom Lehman |
| 4 | 28 Aug 1994 | NEC World Series of Golf (2) | −11 (66-67-69-67=269) | 1 stroke | (United States) Scott Hoch |
| 5 | 11 Apr 1999 | Masters Tournament (2) | −8 (70-66-73-71=280) | 2 strokes | (United States) Davis Love III |
| 6 | 10 Feb 2002 | Buick Invitational | −13 (71-72-67-65=275) | 1 stroke | (United States) J. L. Lewis, (United States) Mark O'Meara |

PGA Tour playoff record (0–2)

| No. | Year | Tournament | Opponents | Result |
|---|---|---|---|---|
| 1 | 2005 | BellSouth Classic | (India) Arjun Atwal, (United States) Rich Beem, (United States) Brandt Jobe, (United States) Phil Mickelson | Mickelson won with birdie on fourth extra hole Olazábal eliminated by par on third hole Atwal and Jobe eliminated by par on first hole |
| 2 | 2006 | Buick Invitational | (Australia) Nathan Green, (United States) Tiger Woods | Woods won with par on second extra hole Green eliminated by par on first hole |

=== European Tour wins (23) ===
Legend
Major championships (2)
Flagship events (1)
Other European Tour (20)

| No. | Date | Tournament | Winning score | Margin of victory | Runner(s)-up |
|---|---|---|---|---|---|
| 1 | 7 Sep 1986 | Ebel European Masters Swiss Open | −26 (64-66-66-66=262) | 3 strokes | (Sweden) Anders Forsbrand |
| 2 | 12 Oct 1986 | Sanyo Open | −15 (69-68-69-67=273) | 3 strokes | (England) Howard Clark |
| 3 | 19 Jun 1988 | Volvo Belgian Open | −15 (67-69-64-69=269) | 4 strokes | (United States) Mike Smith |
| 4 | 25 Sep 1988 | German Masters | −9 (69-72-70-68=279) | 2 strokes | (Sweden) Anders Forsbrand, (Republic of Ireland) Des Smyth |
| 5 | 26 Feb 1989 | Tenerife Open | −13 (69-68-68-70=275) | 3 strokes | (Spain) José María Cañizares |
| 6 | 30 Jul 1989 | KLM Dutch Open | −11 (67-66-68-76=277) | Playoff | (England) Roger Chapman, (Northern Ireland) Ronan Rafferty |
| 7 | 7 May 1990 | Benson & Hedges International Open | −9 (69-68-69-73=279) | 1 stroke | (Wales) Ian Woosnam |
| 8 | 24 Jun 1990 | Carroll's Irish Open | −6 (67-72-71-72=282) | 3 strokes | (United States) Mark Calcavecchia, (New Zealand) Frank Nobilo |
| 9 | 16 Sep 1990 | Trophée Lancôme | −11 (68-66-70-65=269) | 1 stroke | (Scotland) Colin Montgomerie |
| 10 | 17 Mar 1991 | Open Catalonia | −17 (66-68-64-73=271) | 6 strokes | (Northern Ireland) David Feherty |
| 11 | 22 Sep 1991 | Epson Grand Prix of Europe | −19 (64-68-67-66=265) | 9 strokes | (England) Mark James |
| 12 | 23 Feb 1992 | Turespaña Open de Tenerife (2) | −20 (71-68-66-63=268) | 5 strokes | (Spain) Miguel Ángel Martín |
| 13 | 1 Mar 1992 | Open Mediterrania | −12 (68-71-69-68=276) | 2 strokes | (Spain) José Rivero |
| 14 | 6 Mar 1994 | Turespaña Open Mediterrania (2) | −12 (70-65-71-70=276) | Playoff | (Republic of Ireland) Paul McGinley |
| 15 | 10 Apr 1994 | Masters Tournament | −9 (74-67-69-69=279) | 2 strokes | (United States) Tom Lehman |
| 16 | 30 May 1994 | Volvo PGA Championship | −17 (67-68-71-65=271) | 1 stroke | (South Africa) Ernie Els |
| 17 | 23 Mar 1997 | Turespaña Masters Open de Canarias | −20 (70-67-68-67=272) | 2 strokes | (England) Lee Westwood |
| 18 | 1 Mar 1998 | Dubai Desert Classic | −19 (69-67-65-68=269) | 3 strokes | (Australia) Stephen Allan |
| 19 | 11 Apr 1999 | Masters Tournament (2) | −8 (70-66-73-71=280) | 2 strokes | (United States) Davis Love III |
| 20 | 14 May 2000 | Benson & Hedges International Open (2) | −13 (75-68-66-66=275) | 3 strokes | (Wales) Phillip Price |
| 21 | 6 May 2001 | Novotel Perrier Open de France | −12 (66-69-66-67=268) | 2 strokes | (England) Paul Eales, (Italy) Costantino Rocca, (New Zealand) Greg Turner |
| 22 | 2 Dec 2001 (2002 season) | Omega Hong Kong Open^{1} | −22 (65-69-64-64=262) | 1 stroke | (Norway) Henrik Bjørnstad |
| 23 | 23 Oct 2005 | Mallorca Classic | −10 (69-65-70-66=270) | 5 strokes | (England) Paul Broadhurst, (Spain) Sergio García, (Spain) José Manuel Lara |

^{1}Co-sanctioned by the Asian PGA Tour

European Tour playoff record (2–2)

| No. | Year | Tournament | Opponent(s) | Result |
|---|---|---|---|---|
| 1 | 1989 | KLM Dutch Open | (England) Roger Chapman, (Northern Ireland) Ronan Rafferty | Won with double-bogey on ninth extra hole Chapman eliminated by par on first hole |
| 2 | 1993 | Carroll's Irish Open | (England) Nick Faldo | Lost to par on first extra hole |
| 3 | 1994 | Turespaña Open Mediterrania | (Republic of Ireland) Paul McGinley | Won with birdie on second extra hole |
| 4 | 1994 | Mercedes German Masters | (Spain) Seve Ballesteros, (South Africa) Ernie Els | Ballesteros won with birdie on first extra hole |

=== PGA of Japan Tour wins (2) ===
| No. | Date | Tournament | Winning score | Margin of victory | Runner(s)-up |
|---|---|---|---|---|---|
| 1 | 12 Nov 1989 | Visa Taiheiyo Club Masters | −13 (66-70-67=203) (Note: Shortened to 54 holes due to weather.) | 3 strokes | (Japan) Isao Aoki, (Japan) Naomichi Ozaki |
| 2 | 11 Nov 1990 | Visa Taiheiyo Club Masters (2) | −18 (66-68-69-67=270) | 5 strokes | (Germany) Bernhard Langer, (Japan) Masashi Ozaki |

=== Other wins (1) ===
| No. | Date | Tournament | Winning score | Margin of victory | Runners-up |
|---|---|---|---|---|---|
| 1 | 30 Apr 1995 | Tournoi Perrier de Paris (with (Spain) Seve Ballesteros) | −24 (63-67-64-62=256) | 3 strokes | (Australia) Mike Clayton and (Australia) Peter O'Malley |

== Major championships ==
=== Wins (2) ===
| Year | Championship | 54 holes | Winning score | Margin | Runner-up |
|---|---|---|---|---|---|
| 1994 | Masters Tournament | 1 shot deficit | −9 (74-67-69-69=279) | 2 strokes | (United States) Tom Lehman |
| 1999 | Masters Tournament (2) | 1 shot lead | −8 (70-66-73-71=280) | 2 strokes | (United States) Davis Love III |

=== Results timeline ===
Results not in chronological order in 2020.

| Tournament | 1984 | 1985 | 1986 | 1987 | 1988 | 1989 |
|---|---|---|---|---|---|---|
| Masters Tournament | | CUT | | CUT | | T8 |
| U.S. Open | | | | T68 | | T9 |
| The Open Championship | CUT | T25LA | T16 | T11 | T36 | T23 |
| PGA Championship | | | | CUT | | CUT |

| Tournament | 1990 | 1991 | 1992 | 1993 | 1994 | 1995 | 1996 | 1997 | 1998 | 1999 |
|---|---|---|---|---|---|---|---|---|---|---|
| Masters Tournament | 13 | 2 | T42 | T7 | 1 | T14 | | T12 | T12 | 1 |
| U.S. Open | T8 | T8 | CUT | CUT | CUT | T28 | | T16 | T18 | WD |
| The Open Championship | T16 | T80 | 3 | CUT | T38 | T31 | | T20 | T15 | CUT |
| PGA Championship | T14 | CUT | CUT | T56 | T7 | T31 | | CUT | CUT | CUT |

| Tournament | 2000 | 2001 | 2002 | 2003 | 2004 | 2005 | 2006 | 2007 | 2008 | 2009 |
|---|---|---|---|---|---|---|---|---|---|---|
| Masters Tournament | CUT | T15 | 4 | T8 | 30 | CUT | T3 | T44 | CUT | CUT |
| U.S. Open | T12 | CUT | T50 | CUT | | | T21 | T45 | | |
| The Open Championship | T31 | T54 | CUT | CUT | | T3 | T56 | | | |
| PGA Championship | T4 | T37 | 69 | T51 | CUT | T47 | T55 | CUT | | |

| Tournament | 2010 | 2011 | 2012 | 2013 | 2014 | 2015 | 2016 | 2017 | 2018 |
|---|---|---|---|---|---|---|---|---|---|
| Masters Tournament | | CUT | CUT | T50 | T34 | CUT | | CUT | CUT |
| U.S. Open | | | | CUT | | | | | |
| The Open Championship | | | | | | | | | |
| PGA Championship | | CUT | CUT | | | | | | |

| Tournament | 2019 | 2020 | 2021 | 2022 | 2023 | 2024 | 2025 | 2026 |
|---|---|---|---|---|---|---|---|---|
| Masters Tournament | CUT | CUT | T50 | CUT | CUT | T45 | CUT | CUT |
| PGA Championship | | | | | | | | |
| U.S. Open | | | | | | | | |
| The Open Championship | | NT | | | | | | |

Win
Top 10
Did not play

LA = Low amateur
WD = Withdrew
CUT = missed the half-way cut
"T" indicates a tie for a place
NT = no tournament due to COVID-19 pandemic

=== Summary ===
| Tournament | Wins | 2nd | 3rd | Top-5 | Top-10 | Top-25 | Events | Cuts made |
|---|---|---|---|---|---|---|---|---|
| Masters Tournament | 2 | 1 | 1 | 5 | 8 | 13 | 37 | 20 |
| PGA Championship | 0 | 0 | 0 | 1 | 2 | 3 | 21 | 10 |
| U.S. Open | 0 | 0 | 0 | 0 | 3 | 7 | 18 | 11 |
| The Open Championship | 0 | 0 | 2 | 2 | 2 | 9 | 21 | 16 |
| Totals | 2 | 1 | 3 | 8 | 15 | 32 | 97 | 57 |

- Most consecutive cuts made – 9 (1994 Open Championship – 1997 Open Championship)
- Longest streak of top-10s – 2 (twice)

== Results in The Players Championship ==
| Tournament | 1991 | 1992 | 1993 | 1994 | 1995 | 1996 | 1997 | 1998 | 1999 |
|---|---|---|---|---|---|---|---|---|---|
| The Players Championship | CUT | T9 | CUT | T14 | T23 | | | T25 | T52 |

| Tournament | 2000 | 2001 | 2002 | 2003 | 2004 | 2005 | 2006 | 2007 | 2008 |
|---|---|---|---|---|---|---|---|---|---|
| The Players Championship | CUT | T12 | T36 | CUT | CUT | | 7 | T3 | T54 |

Top 10
Did not play

CUT = missed the halfway cut
"T" indicates a tie for a place

== Results in World Golf Championships ==
| Tournament | 1999 | 2000 | 2001 | 2002 | 2003 | 2004 | 2005 | 2006 | 2007 |
|---|---|---|---|---|---|---|---|---|---|
| Match Play | QF | R32 | | QF | R64 | | | R32 | R32 |
| Championship | T11 | T17 | NT^{1} | T27 | | | T51 | T17 | T35 |
| Invitational | 40 | T10 | | T47 | | | T9 | T22 | 82 |

^{1}Cancelled due to 9/11

Top 10
Did not play

QF, R16, R32, R64 = Round in which player lost in match play
"T" = Tied
NT = No tournament

== Results in senior major championships ==
Results not in chronological order.

| Tournament | 2017 | 2018 | 2019 | 2020 | 2021 | 2022 | 2023 | 2024 | 2025 | 2026 |
|---|---|---|---|---|---|---|---|---|---|---|
| Senior PGA Championship | CUT | CUT | | NT | | CUT | | CUT | CUT | T51 |
| The Tradition | T20 | CUT | T39 | NT | T48 | T60 | 76 | | 72 | T59 |
| U.S. Senior Open | | | | NT | CUT | | | | | |
| Senior Players Championship | T68 | | | | T28 | | T59 | T76 | | |
| The Senior Open Championship | T53 | | CUT | NT | T46 | CUT | CUT | CUT | CUT | |

Did not play

CUT = missed the halfway cut
"T" indicates a tie for a place
NT = no tournament due to COVID-19 pandemic

== Team appearances ==
Amateur

- Eisenhower Trophy (representing Spain): 1982, 1984
- Jacques Léglise Trophy (representing the Continent of Europe): 1981, 1982, 1983
- European Amateur Team Championship (representing Spain): 1983, 1985
- European Youths' Team Championship (representing Spain): 1982, 1984
- St Andrews Trophy (representing the Continent of Europe): 1984

Professional

- Alfred Dunhill Cup (representing Spain): 1986, 1987, 1988, 1989, 1992, 1993, 1998, 1999 (winners), 2000 (winners)
- Four Tours World Championship (representing Europe): 1987, 1989
- Ryder Cup (representing Europe): 1987 (winners), 1989 (tied; retained trophy), 1991, 1993, 1997 (winners), 1999, 2006 (winners), 2012 (winners, non-playing captain)
- World Cup (representing Spain): 1989, 2000
- Seve Trophy (representing Continental Europe): 2000 (winners), 2002, 2003, 2005 (playing captain), 2013 (winners, non-playing captain)
- Royal Trophy (representing Europe): 2009 (non-playing captain), 2012 (playing captain), 2013 (non-playing captain)

== See also ==
- List of golfers with most European Tour wins

== Notes ==
Awards
| Preceded by Iker Casillas & Xavi | Prince of Asturias Award for Sports; 2013 | Succeeded by New York City Marathon |
