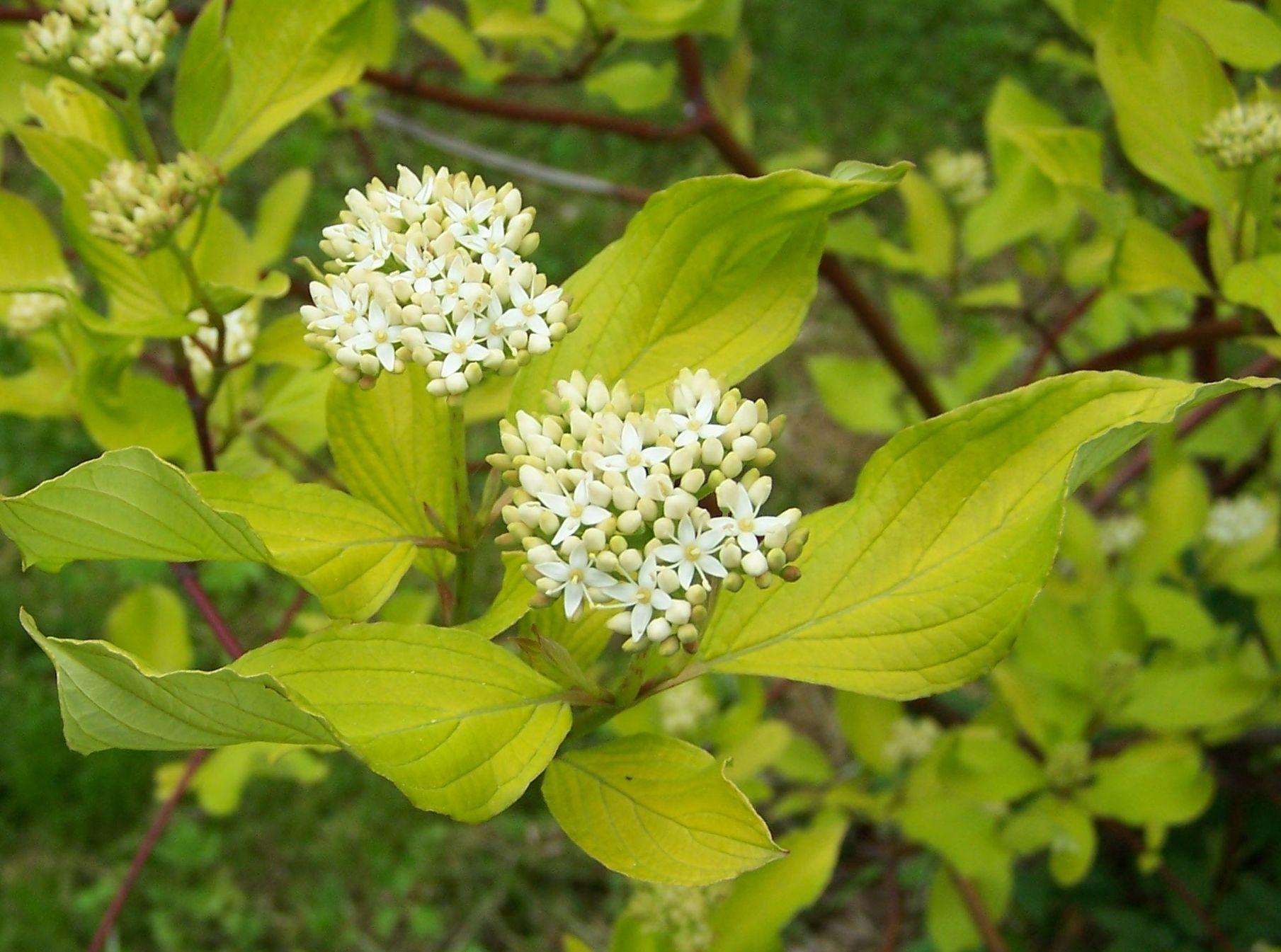
- Leaves and flowers

Scientific classification
- Kingdom: Plantae
- Clade: Tracheophytes
- Clade: Angiosperms
- Clade: Eudicots
- Clade: Asterids
- Order: Cornales
- Family: Cornaceae
- Genus: Cornus
- Subgenus: Cornus subg. Kraniopsis
- Species: C. alba

Binomial name
- Cornus alba L.

= Cornus alba =

Species of flowering plant

Cornus alba, the red-barked, white or Siberian dogwood, is a species of flowering plant in the family Cornaceae, native to Siberia, Mongolia, northern China and Korea. It is a large deciduous surculose (suckering) shrub that can be grown as a small tree. As a popular ornamental used in landscaping its notable features include the red stems in fall (autumn) through late winter, bright winter bark; and the variegated foliage in some cultivars, such as C. alba 'Elegantissima'. C. alba can grow to 3 m (10 ft) high, but variegated forms are less vigorous. For the brightest winter bark, young shoots are encouraged by cutting to the ground some older stems at the end of the winter, before leaves are open. The oval fruits are white, sometimes tinted blue.

The plant is extremely hardy, to USDA Zone 3 - −40 °C (−40 °F).

The Latin specific epithet alba means “white”.

The following cultivars have gained the Royal Horticultural Society's Award of Garden Merit (confirmed 2017):-

- 'Aurea' (yellow leaves)
- 'Elegantissima' (deep red stems and small white flowers)
- 'Sibirica' (2.5 m (8 ft 2 in), brilliant red stems, cream flowers)
- 'Spaethii' (variegated leaves with yellow margins)

== Gallery ==
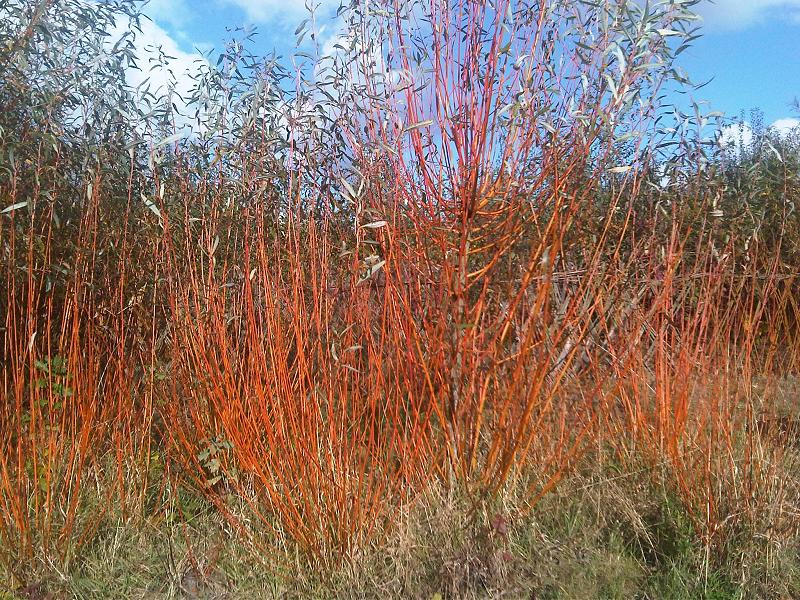
WWT London Wetland Centre, September

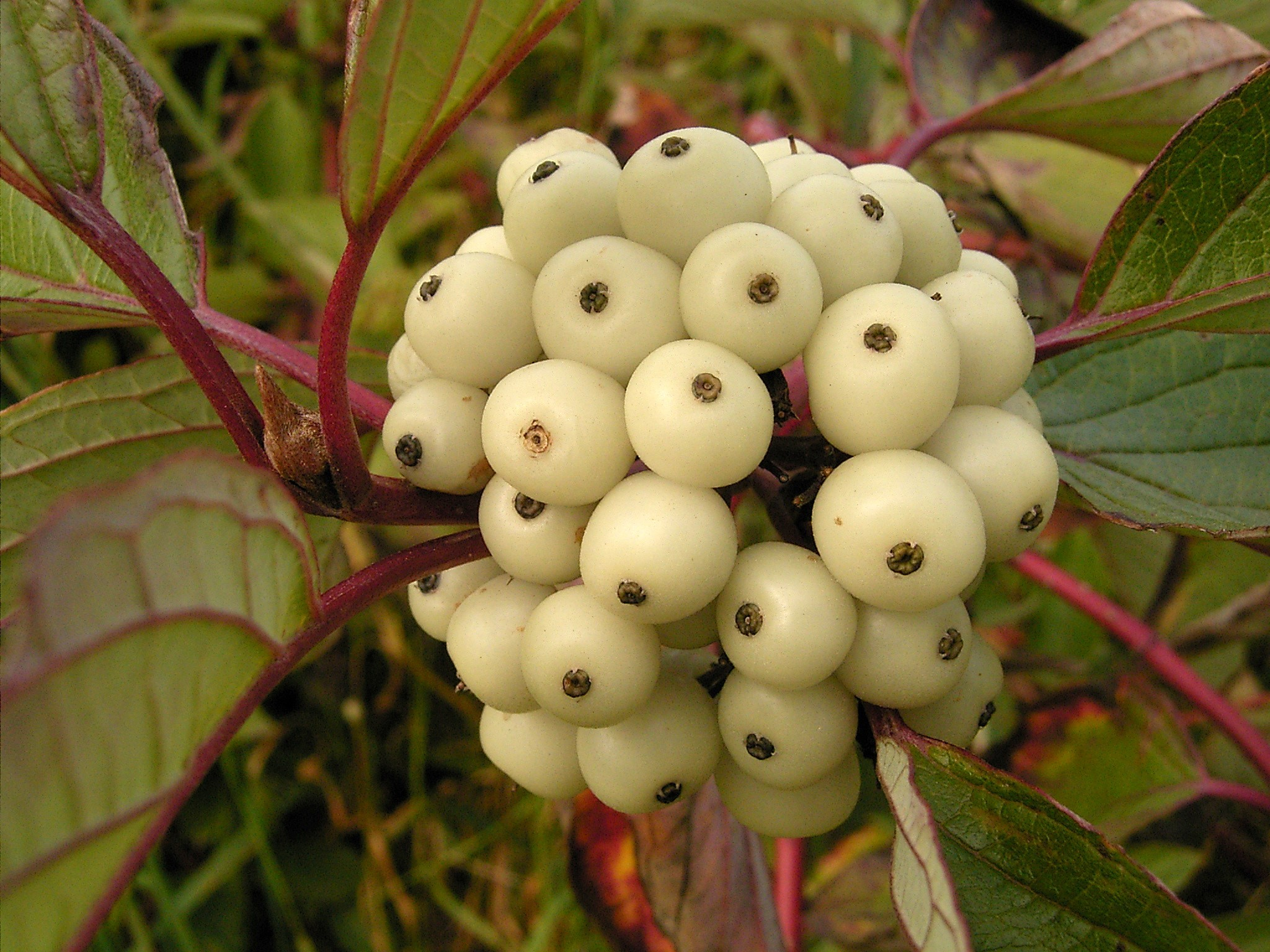
Fruit

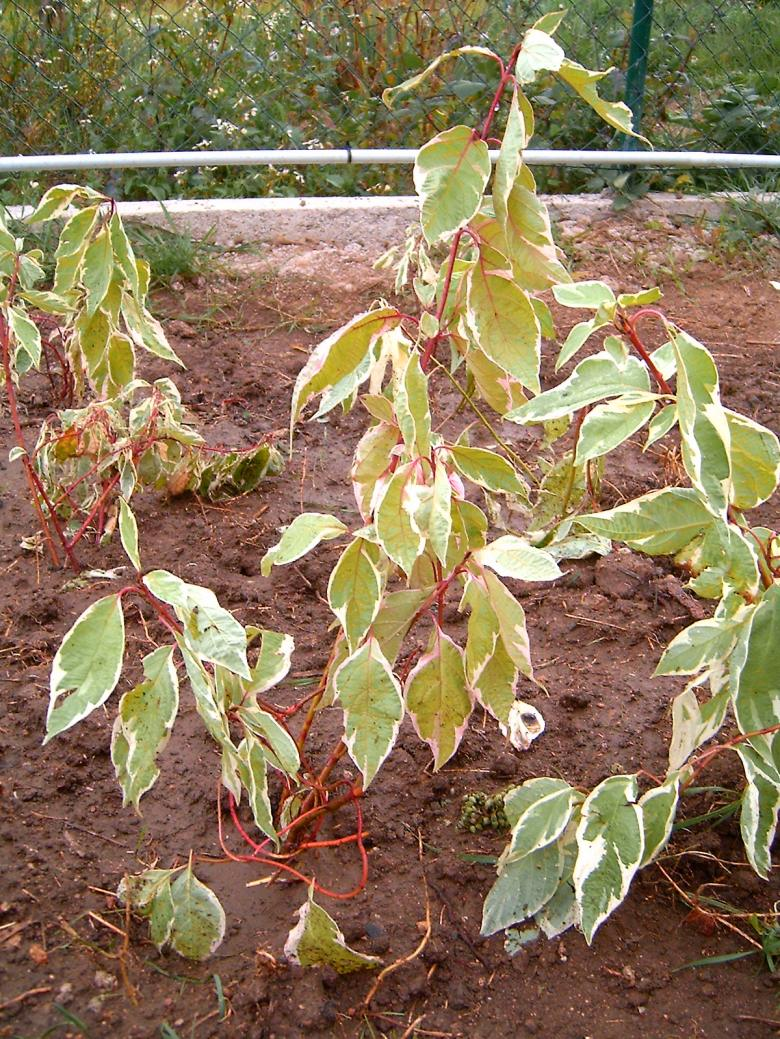
’Elegantissima’ (young plant)

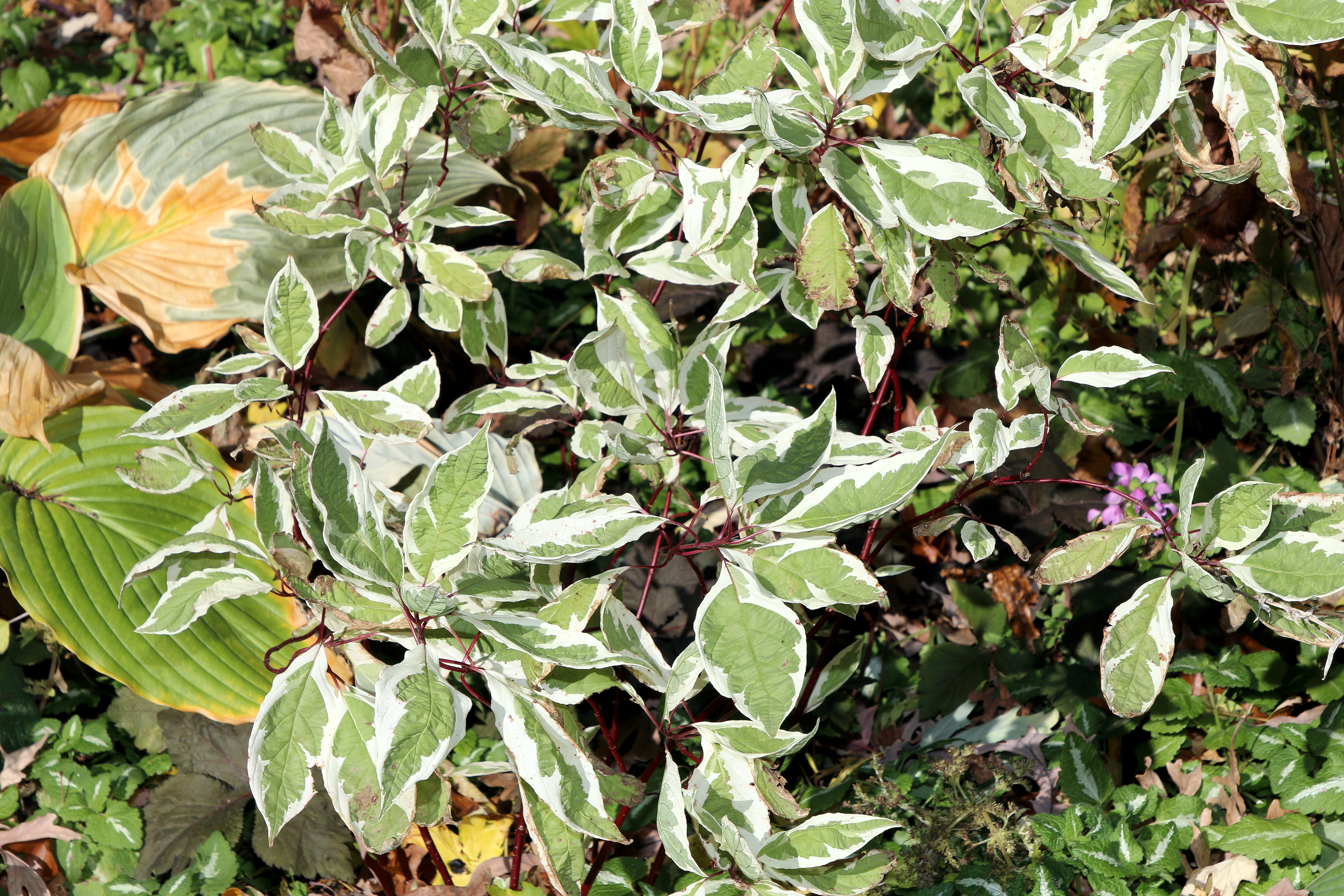
Cornus alba 'Ivory Halo®' a cultivar grown for its variegated foliage.

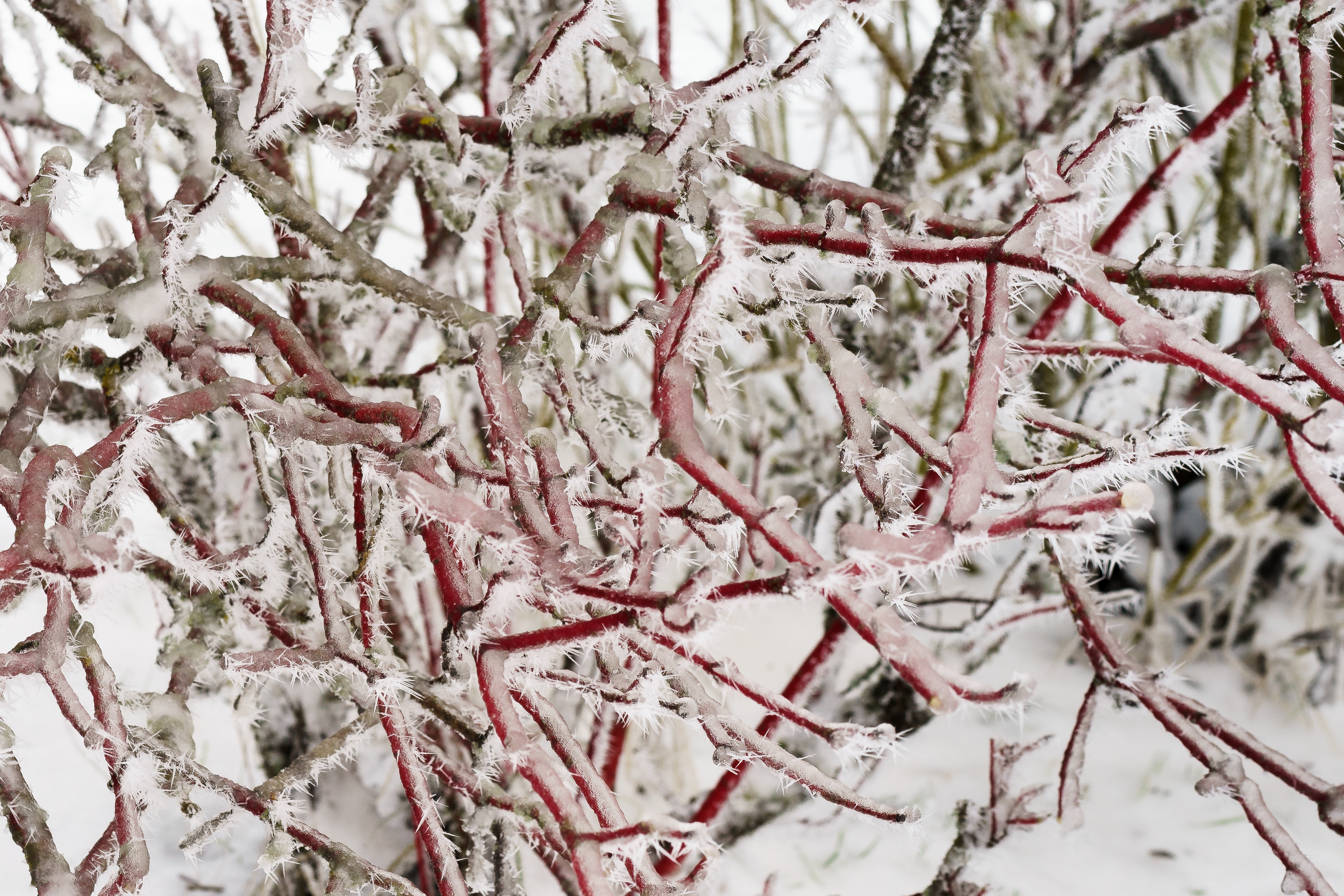
'Sibirica' after freezing rain
