= 1993 Players Championship =

Tournament information
- Dates: March 25–28, 1993
- Location: Ponte Vedra Beach, Florida; 30.198°N 81.394°W
- Courses: TPC Sawgrass, Stadium Course
- Tour: PGA Tour

Statistics
- Par: 72
- Length: 6,896 yards (6,306 m)
- Field: 146 players, 72 after cut
- Cut: 142 (−2)
- Prize fund: $2.5 million
- Winner's share: $450,000

Champion
- (Zimbabwe) Nick Price
- 270 (−18)

Location map
- Location in the United States Location in Florida

The 1993 Players Championship was a golf tournament in Florida on the PGA Tour, held March 25–28 at TPC Sawgrass in Ponte Vedra Beach, southeast of Jacksonville. It was the twentieth Players Championship.

== Tournament summary ==
Nick Price set a scoring record of 270 (−18) at the Stadium Course and finished five strokes ahead of runner-up Bernhard Langer. Price bettered the previous record by three strokes, set by Mark McCumber in 1988 and equaled by Davis Love III in 1992. Price's record was short-lived, as Greg Norman broke it by six strokes with 264 (−24) the following year.

Defending champion Davis Love III finished 23 strokes back, in a tie for 67th place.

== Venue ==
This was the thirteenth Players Championship held at the TPC at Sawgrass Stadium Course, and it remained at 6,896 yards (6,306 m).

== Eligibility requirements ==
The top 125 PGA Tour members from the final 1992 Official Money List.

Fred Couples, Davis Love III, John Cook, Nick Price, Corey Pavin, Tom Kite, Paul Azinger, Brad Faxon, Lee Janzen, Dan Forsman, Mark O'Meara, Steve Elkington, Jeff Sluman, David Frost, Bruce Lietzke, Chip Beck, Greg Norman, Jim Gallagher Jr., Jay Haas, Mark Brooks, Keith Clearwater, Duffy Waldorf, Tom Lehman, David Peoples, John Huston, David Edwards, Craig Stadler, Billy Ray Brown, Steve Pate, Ben Crenshaw, Gene Sauers, Rick Fehr, Fred Funk, Joey Sindelar, Bill Britton, John Daly, Jeff Maggert, Mark Calcavecchia, Lanny Wadkins, Ken Green, Loren Roberts, Payne Stewart, Nolan Henke, Russ Cochran, Larry Mize, Richard Zokol, Rocco Mediate, Tom Watson, Jay Don Blake, Jay Delsing, Andrew Magee, Bill Glasson, Mike Hulbert, Gil Morgan, Howard Twitty, Ian Baker-Finch, Blaine McCallister, Ted Schulz, Dudley Hart, D. A. Weibring, Phil Blackmar, Craig Parry, Wayne Levi, Ed Dougherty, Gary Hallberg, Bruce Fleisher, Brad Bryant, Mark Carnevale, Brad Fabel, Robert Gamez, Mike Standly, Fulton Allem, Peter Persons, Billy Andrade, Donnie Hammond, Brian Claar, Billy Mayfair, Bob Estes, Kenny Perry, Dillard Pruitt, Wayne Grady, Mike Smith, Kirk Triplett, Mark Wiebe, John Inman, Tom Sieckmann, John Adams, Phil Mickelson, Bob Gilder, Jim McGovern, Tom Purtzer, Larry Rinker, Jim Woodward, Doug Tewell, Scott Simpson, Dick Mast, Curtis Strange, Ed Humenik, David Toms, Scott Gump, Neal Lancaster, Mike Springer, Kelly Gibson, Mark McCumber, Don Pooley, Jim Hallet, Steve Lamontagne, Dan Pohl, Ronnie Black, Bob Lohr, Robert Wrenn, Fuzzy Zoeller, Ed Fiori, P. H. Horgan III, Mike Reid, Dan Halldorson, Dave Barr, Mike Donald, Mike Sullivan, Lance Ten Broeck, Marco Dawson, Buddy Gardner, Roger Maltbie

Designated players.

John Mahaffey, Jodie Mudd, Larry Nelson, Hale Irwin

Any foreign player meeting the requirements of a designated player, whether or not he is a PGA Tour member.

Ian Woosnam, José María Olazábal

Winners in the last 10 calendar years of The Players Championship, Masters Tournament, U.S. Open, PGA Championship, and World Series of Golf.

Hal Sutton, Calvin Peete, Bernhard Langer, Hubert Green, Bob Tway, Denis Watson

British Open winners since 1990.

Six players, not otherwise eligible, designated by The Players Championship Committee as "special selections."

Ernie Els, Anders Forsbrand, Tony Johnstone, Jumbo Ozaki, Naomichi Ozaki, Vijay Singh

To complete a field of 144 players, those players in order, not otherwise eligible, from the 1993 Official Money List, as of the completion of the Nestle Invitational.

Brett Ogle, Greg Twiggs, Dave Rummells, Scott Hoch, Joel Edwards

== Round summaries ==
=== First round ===
Thursday, March 25, 1993

| Place | Player | Score | To par |
|---|---|---|---|
| T1 | (Zimbabwe) Nick Price | 64 | −8 |
| T1 | (United States) Kirk Triplett | 64 | −8 |
| T3 | (Germany) Bernhard Langer | 65 | −7 |
| T3 | (United States) Joey Sindelar | 65 | −7 |
| T5 | (United States) Ronnie Black | 66 | −6 |
| T5 | (United States) Joel Edwards | 66 | −6 |
| T5 | (United States) Donnie Hammond | 66 | −6 |
| T5 | (Australia) Greg Norman | 66 | −6 |
| T9 | (United States) Russ Cochran | 67 | −5 |
| T9 | (Australia) Steve Elkington | 67 | −5 |
| T9 | (United States) Brad Faxon | 67 | −5 |
| T9 | (United States) Rick Fehr | 67 | −5 |
| T9 | (United States) Mark O'Meara | 67 | −5 |
| T9 | (United States) Doug Tewell | 67 | −5 |
| T9 | (United States) Robert Wrenn | 67 | −5 |
| T9 | (United States) Fuzzy Zoeller | 67 | −5 |

=== Second round ===
Friday, March 26, 1993

| Place | Player | Score | To par |
|---|---|---|---|
| 1 | (Zimbabwe) Nick Price | 64-68=132 | −12 |
| T2 | (Germany) Bernhard Langer | 65-69=134 | −10 |
| T2 | (United States) Dave Rummells | 69-65=134 | −10 |
| T2 | (United States) Doug Tewell | 67-67=134 | −10 |
| 5 | (United States) Joel Edwards | 66-69=135 | −9 |
| T8 | (United States) Ronnie Black | 66-70=136 | −8 |
| T8 | (United States) Brad Fabel | 68-68=136 | −8 |
| T8 | (Australia) Greg Norman | 66-70=136 | −8 |
| T8 | (United States) Joey Sindelar | 65-71=136 | −8 |
| T8 | (United States) Jeff Sluman | 71-65=136 | −8 |

=== Third round ===
Saturday, March 27, 1993

| Place | Player | Score | To par |
|---|---|---|---|
| 1 | (Zimbabwe) Nick Price | 64-68-71=203 | −13 |
| T2 | (Germany) Bernhard Langer | 65-69-70=204 | −12 |
| T2 | (Australia) Greg Norman | 66-70-68=204 | −12 |
| T2 | (United States) Mark O'Meara | 67-71-66=204 | −12 |
| 5 | (United States) Paul Azinger | 68-69-68=205 | −11 |
| T6 | (United States) Ken Green | 70-67-69=206 | −10 |
| T6 | (United States) Payne Stewart | 70-70-66=206 | −10 |
| T8 | (United States) Ronnie Black | 66-70-71=207 | −9 |
| T8 | (United States) Joel Edwards | 66-69-72=207 | −9 |
| T8 | (United States) Jim Gallagher | 69-69-69=207 | −9 |
| T8 | (United States) Jay Haas | 69-70-68=207 | −9 |
| T8 | (United States) Rocco Mediate | 68-71-68=207 | −9 |

=== Final round ===
Sunday, March 28, 1993

Champion
(c) = past champion

| Place | Player | Score | To par | Money ($) |
|---|---|---|---|---|
| 1 | (Zimbabwe) Nick Price | 64-68-71-67=270 | −18 | 450,000 |
| 2 | (Germany) Bernhard Langer | 65-69-70-71=275 | −13 | 270,000 |
| T3 | (United States) Gil Morgan | 68-71-72-65=276 | −12 | 145,000 |
| T3 | (Australia) Greg Norman | 66-70-68-72=276 | −12 | 145,000 |
| 5 | (United States) Mark O'Meara | 67-71-66-73=277 | −11 | 100,000 |
| T6 | (United States) Paul Azinger | 68-69-68-73=278 | −10 | 80,937 |
| T6 | (United States) Ken Green | 70-67-69-72=278 | −10 | 80,937 |
| T6 | (United States) Rocco Mediate | 68-71-68-71=278 | −10 | 80,937 |
| T6 | (Japan) Naomichi Ozaki | 72-68-68-70=278 | −10 | 80,937 |
| 10 | (United States) Tom Watson | 70-72-69-68=279 | −9 | 67,500 |

Leaderboard below the top 10
| Place | Player | Score | To par | Money ($) |
|---|---|---|---|---|
| T11 | (United States) Joel Edwards | 66-69-72-73=280 | −8 | 53,000 |
| T11 | (United States) Dan Forsman | 71-67-73-69=280 | −8 | 53,000 |
| T11 | (United States) Mike Hulbert | 71-67-72-70=280 | −8 | 53,000 |
| T11 | (United States) Tom Lehman | 69-73-69-69=280 | −8 | 53,000 |
| T11 | (United States) Payne Stewart | 70-70-66-74=280 | −8 | 53,000 |
| T16 | (Australia) Steve Elkington (c) | 67-70-71-73=281 | −7 | 38,750 |
| T16 | (United States) Corey Pavin | 69-72-67-73=281 | −7 | 38,750 |
| T16 | (United States) Dave Rummells | 69-65-74-73=281 | −7 | 38,750 |
| T16 | (United States) Joey Sindelar | 65-71-73-72=281 | −7 | 38,750 |
| T20 | (South Africa) Fulton Allem | 70-72-73-67=282 | −6 | 26,071 |
| T20 | (United States) Billy Andrade | 71-70-73-68=282 | −6 | 26,071 |
| T20 | (United States) Bob Estes | 70-68-72-72=282 | −6 | 26,071 |
| T20 | (United States) Jay Haas | 69-70-68-75=282 | −6 | 26,071 |
| T20 | (United States) Andrew Magee | 70-71-71-70=282 | −6 | 26,071 |
| T20 | (United States) Mark McCumber (c) | 68-70-70-74=282 | −6 | 26,071 |
| T20 | (United States) Doug Tewell | 67-67-74-74=282 | −6 | 26,071 |
| 27 | (United States) Russ Cochran | 67-72-71-73=283 | −5 | 19,250 |
| T28 | (United States) Ronnie Black | 66-70-71-77=284 | −4 | 16,625 |
| T28 | (United States) Brian Claar | 72-69-74-69=284 | −4 | 16,625 |
| T28 | (United States) Bruce Lietzke | 69-69-72-74=284 | −4 | 16,625 |
| T28 | (United States) Bob Lohr | 71-71-70-72=284 | −4 | 16,625 |
| T28 | (Fiji) Vijay Singh | 69-71-72-72=284 | −4 | 16,625 |
| T28 | (United States) Howard Twitty | 71-70-71-72=284 | −4 | 16,625 |
| T34 | (United States) Donnie Hammond | 66-73-73-73=285 | −3 | 12,900 |
| T34 | (United States) Lee Janzen | 70-71-71-73=285 | −3 | 12,900 |
| T34 | (United States) Ted Schulz | 71-70-73-71=285 | −3 | 12,900 |
| T34 | (United States) Robert Wrenn | 67-73-73-72=285 | −3 | 12,900 |
| T34 | (United States) Fuzzy Zoeller | 67-75-74-69=285 | −3 | 12,900 |
| T39 | (Australia) Ian Baker-Finch | 71-71-71-73=286 | −2 | 9,750 |
| T39 | (United States) Fred Couples (c) | 68-69-75-74=286 | −2 | 9,750 |
| T39 | (United States) Fred Funk | 68-73-73-72=286 | −2 | 9,750 |
| T39 | (United States) Jim Gallagher Jr. | 69-69-69-79=286 | −2 | 9,750 |
| T39 | (United States) Mike Smith | 70-69-74-73=286 | −2 | 9,750 |
| T39 | (United States) Kirk Triplett | 64-78-75-69=286 | −2 | 9,750 |
| T39 | (Wales) Ian Woosnam | 71-70-69-76=286 | −2 | 9,750 |
| T46 | (United States) Marco Dawson | 68-73-75-71=287 | −1 | 6,800 |
| T46 | (United States) David Edwards | 69-70-71-77=287 | −1 | 6,800 |
| T46 | (United States) Bruce Fleisher | 74-67-72-74=287 | −1 | 6,800 |
| T46 | (United States) Gary Hallberg | 71-71-74-71=287 | −1 | 6,800 |
| T46 | (United States) Larry Rinker | 70-72-72-73=287 | −1 | 6,800 |
| T46 | (United States) Jeff Sluman | 71-65-80-71=287 | −1 | 6,800 |
| T52 | (United States) Brad Bryant | 69-70-72-77=288 | E | 5,771 |
| T52 | (United States) Rick Fehr | 67-71-74-76=288 | E | 5,771 |
| T52 | (Zimbabwe) Tony Johnstone | 70-71-70-77=288 | E | 5,771 |
| T52 | (United States) Billy Mayfair | 73-68-72-75=288 | E | 5,771 |
| T52 | (United States) Peter Persons | 73-68-73-74=288 | E | 5,771 |
| T52 | (United States) Duffy Waldorf | 72-66-75-75=288 | E | 5,771 |
| T52 | (Zimbabwe) Denis Watson | 72-66-74-76=288 | E | 5,771 |
| T59 | (United States) Brad Fabel | 68-68-77-76=289 | +1 | 5,525 |
| T59 | (United States) Dick Mast | 70-70-77-72=289 | +1 | 5,525 |
| T61 | (United States) Ed Dougherty | 69-71-76-74=290 | +2 | 5,375 |
| T61 | (Australia) Brett Ogle | 70-72-68-80=290 | +2 | 5,375 |
| T61 | (United States) D. A. Weibring | 69-73-72-76=290 | +2 | 5,375 |
| T61 | (United States) Mark Wiebe | 71-70-74-75=290 | +2 | 5,375 |
| T65 | (United States) Nolan Henke | 70-72-73-76=291 | +3 | 5,225 |
| T65 | (United States) Kenny Perry | 70-69-76-76=291 | +3 | 5,225 |
| T67 | (United States) Davis Love III (c) | 70-69-82-72=293 | +5 | 5,125 |
| T67 | (United States) Mike Reid | 68-73-72-80=293 | +5 | 5,125 |
| 69 | (United States) Dillard Pruitt | 70-72-72-80=294 | +6 | 5,050 |
| 70 | (United States) Billy Ray Brown | 68-74-78-78=298 | +10 | 5,000 |
| CUT | (United States) John Adams | 74-69=143 | −1 | |
| CUT | (United States) Bill Britton | 73-70=143 | −1 | |
| CUT | (United States) Keith Clearwater | 73-70=143 | −1 | |
| CUT | (United States) Jay Delsing | 69-74=143 | −1 | |
| CUT | (United States) Mike Donald | 71-72=143 | −1 | |
| CUT | (South Africa) Ernie Els | 69-74=143 | −1 | |
| CUT | (Australia) Wayne Grady | 71-72=143 | −1 | |
| CUT | (United States) Scott Gump | 69-74=143 | −1 | |
| CUT | (United States) Scott Hoch | 72-71=143 | −1 | |
| CUT | (United States) Hale Irwin | 70-73=143 | −1 | |
| CUT | (United States) Roger Maltbie | 72-71=143 | −1 | |
| CUT | (United States) Blaine McCallister | 73-70=143 | −1 | |
| CUT | (United States) Jim McGovern | 72-71=143 | −1 | |
| CUT | (United States) Larry Mize | 71-72=143 | −1 | |
| CUT | (United States) Steve Pate | 71-72=143 | −1 | |
| CUT | (United States) Scott Simpson | 70-73=143 | −1 | |
| CUT | (United States) Curtis Strange | 69-74=143 | −1 | |
| CUT | (United States) David Toms | 69-74=143 | −1 | |
| CUT | (United States) Chip Beck | 71-73=144 | E | |
| CUT | (United States) Mark Calcavecchia | 71-73=144 | E | |
| CUT | (South Africa) David Frost | 74-70=144 | E | |
| CUT | (United States) Buddy Gardner | 75-69=144 | E | |
| CUT | (United States) Kelly Gibson | 74-70=144 | E | |
| CUT | (United States) Bob Gilder | 72-72=144 | E | |
| CUT | (United States) Bill Glasson | 72-72=144 | E | |
| CUT | (United States) John Inman | 72-72=144 | E | |
| CUT | (United States) Tom Kite (c) | 72-72=144 | E | |
| CUT | (United States) Jeff Maggert | 70-74=144 | E | |
| CUT | (United States) Jodie Mudd (c) | 71-73=144 | E | |
| CUT | (Australia) Craig Parry | 75-69=144 | E | |
| CUT | (United States) Calvin Peete (c) | 73-71=144 | E | |
| CUT | (United States) Tom Purtzer | 71-73=144 | E | |
| CUT | (United States) Gene Sauers | 71-73=144 | E | |
| CUT | (United States) Mike Sullivan | 69-75=144 | E | |
| CUT | (United States) Greg Twiggs | 70-74=144 | E | |
| CUT | (Canada) Dave Barr | 75-70=145 | +1 | |
| CUT | (United States) Phil Blackmar | 72-73=145 | +1 | |
| CUT | (United States) John Daly | 79-66=145 | +1 | |
| CUT | (United States) John Huston | 69-76=145 | +1 | |
| CUT | (United States) Steve Lamontagne | 72-73=145 | +1 | |
| CUT | (United States) Don Pooley | 70-75=145 | +1 | |
| CUT | (United States) Craig Stadler | 73-72=145 | +1 | |
| CUT | (United States) Ben Crenshaw | 70-76=146 | +2 | |
| CUT | (Sweden) Anders Forsbrand | 70-76=146 | +2 | |
| CUT | (United States) Ed Humenik | 74-72=146 | +2 | |
| CUT | (United States) Wayne Levi | 71-75=146 | +2 | |
| CUT | (United States) John Mahaffey (c) | 71-75=146 | +2 | |
| CUT | (United States) Phil Mickelson | 71-75=146 | +2 | |
| CUT | (United States) Larry Nelson | 70-76=146 | +2 | |
| CUT | (United States) Loren Roberts | 73-73=146 | +2 | |
| CUT | (United States) Mike Standly | 71-75=146 | +2 | |
| CUT | (United States) Lance Ten Broeck | 72-74=146 | +2 | |
| CUT | (United States) Mark Brooks | 73-74=147 | +3 | |
| CUT | (Canada) Dan Halldorson | 72-75=147 | +3 | |
| CUT | (United States) Jim Hallet | 74-73=147 | +3 | |
| CUT | (United States) Neal Lancaster | 76-71=147 | +3 | |
| CUT | (United States) Mike Springer | 72-75=147 | +3 | |
| CUT | (United States) Hal Sutton (c) | 74-73=147 | +3 | |
| CUT | (United States) Lanny Wadkins (c) | 74-74=148 | +4 | |
| CUT | (United States) Mark Carnevale | 72-77=149 | +5 | |
| CUT | (United States) David Peoples | 75-75=150 | +6 | |
| CUT | (United States) Tom Sieckmann | 77-73=150 | +6 | |
| CUT | (United States) John Cook | 77-74=151 | +7 | |
| CUT | (Spain) José María Olazábal | 78-73=151 | +7 | |
| CUT | (United States) Bob Tway | 77-74=151 | +7 | |
| CUT | (United States) Robert Gamez | 74-78=152 | +8 | |
| CUT | (United States) P. H. Horgan III | 74-80=154 | +10 | |
| CUT | (United States) Jim Woodward | 75-81=156 | +12 | |
| WD | (United States) Dan Pohl | 69-70-84=223 | +7 | |
| WD | (United States) Ed Fiori | 75-73=148 | +4 | |
| WD | (United States) Jay Don Blake | 74-75=149 | +5 | |
| WD | (Canada) Richard Zokol | 73-79=152 | +8 | |
| WD | (United States) Dudley Hart | 76-83=159 | +15 | |
| WD | (Japan) Masashi Ozaki | 75 | +3 | |
| WD | (United States) Hubert Green | 78 | +6 | |
| DQ | (United States) Brad Faxon | 67-75-78=220 | +4 | |
