= 1994 Players Championship =

Tournament information
- Dates: March 24–27, 1994
- Location: Ponte Vedra Beach, Florida; 30.198°N 81.394°W
- Courses: TPC Sawgrass, Stadium Course
- Tour: PGA Tour

Statistics
- Par: 72
- Length: 6,896 yards (6,306 m)
- Field: 144 players, 85 after cut
- Cut: 144 (E)
- Prize fund: $2.5 million
- Winner's share: $450,000

Champion
- (Australia) Greg Norman
- 264 (−24)

Location map
- Location in the United States Location in Florida

The 1994 Players Championship was a golf tournament in Florida on the PGA Tour, held March 24–27 at TPC Sawgrass in Ponte Vedra Beach, southeast of Jacksonville. It was the 21st Players Championship.

== Tournament summary ==
Greg Norman set the scoring record of 264 (−24) at the Stadium Course and finished four strokes ahead of runner-up Fuzzy Zoeller. Norman opened with 63 and followed with three rounds at 67 to set the 36-hole (130) and 54-hole (197) scoring records as well.

Nick Price had set the mark the previous year at 270 (−18), three better than Mark McCumber's 273 in 1988 (equaled by Davis Love III in 1992).

Defending champion Nick Price missed the 36-hole cut by five strokes.

== Venue ==
This was the thirteenth Players Championship held at the TPC at Sawgrass Stadium Course, and it remained at 6,896 yards (6,306 m).

== Eligibility requirements ==
The top 125 PGA Tour members from Final 1993 Official Money List.

Nick Price, Greg Norman, Jim Gallagher Jr., David Frost, Payne Stewart, Lee Janzen, Tom Kite, Fulton Allem, Jeff Maggert, Davis Love III, Larry Mize, Scott Simpson, John Huston, Steve Elkington, Corey Pavin, David Edwards, Mark Calcavecchia, Chip Beck, Jay Haas, Jim McGovern, Rick Fehr, Craig Stadler, Billy Mayfair, Nolan Henke, Bob Estes, Tom Lehman, Howard Twitty, Grant Waite, Dan Forsman, Scott Hoch, Joey Sindelar, Fuzzy Zoeller, Billy Andrade, Mark McCumber, Mark O'Meara, Keith Clearwater, John Cook, Tom Watson, Donnie Hammond, Brett Ogle, Mike Standly, Craig Parry, Ben Crenshaw, Dudley Hart, Loren Roberts, Bob Lohr, Brad Faxon, Fred Funk, Bill Glasson, D. A. Weibring, Russ Cochran, Greg Kraft, Blaine McCallister, Andrew Magee, Curtis Strange, Steve Pate, Hale Irwin, Mark Brooks, Dave Rummells, Lanny Wadkins, John Inman, Robert Gamez, Jay Delsing, Greg Twiggs, Michael Allen, Brad Bryant, Ken Green, John Daly, Peter Jacobsen, John Adams, Mike Springer, Richard Zokol, Bruce Fleisher, Dick Mast, Phil Blackmar, Duffy Waldorf, Brian Claar, Jay Don Blake, Tom Sieckmann, Kenny Perry, Mike Hulbert, Kirk Triplett, Steve Lowery, Jeff Sluman, Brian Kamm, Wayne Levi, Dave Barr, Billy Ray Brown, Dillard Pruitt, Ed Dougherty, Ted Schulz, Bruce Lietzke, John Flannery, Roger Maltbie, David Ogrin, Ed Humenik, Joel Edwards, Neal Lancaster, Bob Gilder, Bob Tway, Kelly Gibson, Gary Hallberg, Willie Wood, Lennie Clements, Ian Baker-Finch, Joe Ozaki, Ted Tryba, Doug Tewell, Larry Rinker, Brandel Chamblee, Michael Bradley, David Toms, Marco Dawson, Ronnie Black, Trevor Dodds, Ed Fiori, Gene Sauers

All winners of PGA Tour events awarding official money and official victory status in the preceding 12 months concluding with the Nestle Invitational.

Vijay Singh

Designated players.

Wayne Grady, Tom Purtzer, Jodie Mudd, Tim Simpson

Any foreign player meeting the requirements of designated player, whether or not he is a PGA Tour member.

Nick Faldo, Ian Woosnam, Bernhard Langer, Seve Ballesteros

Winners in the last 10 calendar years of The Players Championship, Masters Tournament, U.S. Open, PGA Championship, and NEC World Series of Golf.

Hubert Green, Denis Watson, Calvin Peete, Sandy Lyle, Larry Nelson, Dan Pohl, Mike Reid, John Mahaffey

British Open winners since 1990.

Six players, not otherwise eligible, designated by The Players Championship Committee as "special selections."

Ernie Els, Mark McNulty, Masashi Ozaki, José María Olazábal, Colin Montgomerie, Peter Senior

To complete a field of 144 players, those players in order, not otherwise eligible, from the 1994 Official Money List, as of the completion of the Nestle Invitational.

Paul Goydos, Hal Sutton, Steve Stricker, Jim Thorpe

== Round summaries ==
=== First round ===
Thursday, March 24, 1994

Place	Player	Score	To par
1	(Australia) Greg Norman	63	−9
T2	(United States) Lee Janzen	65	−7
T2	(United States) Tom Kite	65	−7
T2	(United States) Jeff Maggert	65	−7
T2	(Scotland) Colin Montgomerie	65	−7
6	(United States) Fuzzy Zoeller	66	−6
T7	(United States) Jay Delsing	67	−5
T7	(England) Nick Faldo	67	−5
T7	(United States) Dan Forsman	67	−5
T7	(Australia) Wayne Grady	67	−5
T7	(United States) Hale Irwin	67	−5
T7	(United States) Hal Sutton	67	−5

=== Second round ===
Friday, March 25, 1994
Saturday, March 26, 1994

Place	Player	Score	To par
1	(Australia) Greg Norman	63-67=130	−14
2	(United States) Fuzzy Zoeller	66-67=133	−11
T3	(United States) Davis Love III	68-66=134	−10
T3	(United States) Jeff Maggert	65-69=134	−10
T5	(Australia) Craig Parry	69-66=135	−9
T5	(United States) Hal Sutton	67-68=135	−9
T7	(England) Nick Faldo	67-69=136	−8
T7	(United States) Brad Faxon	68-68=136	−8
T7	(United States) Tom Kite	65-71=136	−8
T7	(United States) Mike Springer	68-68=136	−8

=== Third round ===
Saturday, March 26, 1994

Place	Player	Score	To par
1	(Australia) Greg Norman	63-67-67=197	−19
2	(United States) Fuzzy Zoeller	66-67-68=201	−15
3	(United States) Jeff Maggert	65-69-69=203	−13
T4	(England) Nick Faldo	67-69-68=204	−12
T4	(United States) Davis Love III	68-66-70=204	−12
T6	(United States) Brad Faxon	68-68-70=206	−10
T6	(United States) Gary Hallberg	68-69-69=206	−10
T6	(United States) Tom Kite	65-71-70=206	−10
9	(United States) Hale Irwin	67-70-70=207	−9
T10	(Australia) Craig Parry	69-66-73=208	−8
T10	(United States) Mike Springer	68-68-72=208	−8

=== Final round ===
Sunday, March 27, 1994

Champion
(c) = past champion

Place	Player	Score	To par	Money ($)
1	(Australia) Greg Norman	63-67-67-67=264	−24	450,000
2	(United States) Fuzzy Zoeller	66-67-68-67=268	−20	270,000
3	(United States) Jeff Maggert	65-69-69-68=271	−17	170,000
4	(United States) Hale Irwin	67-70-70-69=276	−12	120,000
5	(England) Nick Faldo	67-69-68-73=277	−11	100,000
T6	(United States) Brad Faxon	68-68-70-72=278	−10	83,750
T6	(United States) Davis Love III (c)	68-66-70-74=278	−10	83,750
T6	(United States) Steve Lowery	68-74-69-67=278	−10	83,750
T9	(United States) Gary Hallberg	68-69-69-73=279	−9	65,000
T9	(United States) Nolan Henke	73-69-69-68=279	−9	65,000
T9	(United States) Tom Kite (c)	65-71-70-73=279	−9	65,000
T9	(Scotland) Colin Montgomerie	65-73-71-70=279	−9	65,000

Leaderboard below the top 10
Place	Player	Score	To par	Money ($)
13	(United States) Mike Springer	68-68-72-72=280	−8	52,500
T14	(Canada) Dave Barr	68-69-72-72=281	−7	42,500
T14	(Spain) José María Olazábal	69-69-73-70=281	−7	42,500
T14	(Australia) Craig Parry	69-66-73-73=281	−7	42,500
T14	(United States) Loren Roberts	68-71-71-71=281	−7	42,500
T14	(United States) Tom Watson	71-72-71-67=281	−7	42,500
T19	(United States) Ben Crenshaw	72-72-68-70=282	−6	31,375
T19	(United States) Dillard Pruitt	70-71-68-73=282	−6	31,375
T19	(United States) Mike Standly	72-71-68-71=282	−6	31,375
T19	(United States) Hal Sutton (c)	67-68-74-73=282	−6	31,375
T23	(United States) Mark Calcavecchia	70-72-69-72=283	−5	23,000
T23	(United States) John Cook	70-71-72-70=283	−5	23,000
T23	(United States) Tim Simpson	69-71-70-73=283	−5	23,000
T23	(United States) Steve Stricker	72-70-70-71=283	−5	23,000
T27	(United States) Chip Beck	73-71-67-73=284	−4	16,640
T27	(United States) Lennie Clements	68-71-74-71=284	−4	16,640
T27	(United States) Jay Delsing	67-73-71-73=284	−4	16,640
T27	(United States) Ed Fiori	70-68-74-72=284	−4	16,640
T27	(United States) Jim Gallagher Jr.	76-68-70-70=284	−4	16,640
T27	(Germany) Bernhard Langer	74-68-70-72=284	−4	16,640
T27	(United States) Wayne Levi	72-68-72-72=284	−4	16,640
T27	(United States) John Mahaffey (c)	71-73-65-75=284	−4	16,640
T35	(United States) Jay Don Blake	70-73-69-73=285	−3	11,037
T35	(United States) Bob Estes	70-71-70-74=285	−3	11,037
T35	(United States) Bob Gilder	71-71-70-73=285	−3	11,037
T35	(United States) Mike Hulbert	71-71-70-73=285	−3	11,037
T35	(United States) John Huston	68-73-72-72=285	−3	11,037
T35	(United States) Lee Janzen	65-75-70-75=285	−3	11,037
T35	(United States) Neal Lancaster	71-68-72-74=285	−3	11,037
T35	(United States) Roger Maltbie	71-69-73-72=285	−3	11,037
T35	(United States) Joey Sindelar	70-74-70-71=285	−3	11,037
T35	(United States) Ted Tryba	68-73-69-75=285	−3	11,037
T45	(South Africa) Ernie Els	69-73-72-72=286	−2	7,150
T45	(United States) Rick Fehr	70-73-68-75=286	−2	7,150
T45	(Australia) Wayne Grady	67-73-71-75=286	−2	7,150
T45	(United States) Andrew Magee	72-71-70-73=286	−2	7,150
T45	(Japan) Naomichi Ozaki	71-72-70-73=286	−2	7,150
T45	(United States) Kirk Triplett	71-72-70-73=286	−2	7,150
T51	(United States) David Edwards	69-70-72-76=287	−1	5,962
T51	(Australia) Steve Elkington (c)	71-72-75-69=287	−1	5,962
T51	(United States) Gene Sauers	73-69-75-70=287	−1	5,962
T51	(New Zealand) Grant Waite	74-68-71-74=287	−1	5,962
T55	(South Africa) Fulton Allem	70-71-72-75=288	E	5,600
T55	(United States) Brian Claar	68-76-72-72=288	E	5,600
T55	(United States) Keith Clearwater	70-72-70-76=288	E	5,600
T55	(United States) Jay Haas	75-69-71-73=288	E	5,600
T55	(United States) Jim McGovern	72-72-71-73=288	E	5,600
T55	(United States) Larry Nelson	70-67-76-75=288	E	5,600
T55	(Fiji) Vijay Singh	71-69-69-79=288	E	5,600
T62	(United States) Michael Allen	74-69-73-73=289	+1	5,250
T62	(United States) Joel Edwards	68-75-73-73=289	+1	5,250
T62	(United States) Paul Goydos	72-72-71-74=289	+1	5,250
T62	(United States) Mark McCumber (c)	73-71-75-70=289	+1	5,250
T62	(United States) Kenny Perry	69-75-73-72=289	+1	5,250
T62	(United States) Jim Thorpe	73-69-73-74=289	+1	5,250
T62	(United States) Howard Twitty	69-75-72-73=289	+1	5,250
T69	(Australia) Ian Baker-Finch	73-69-74-74=290	+2	4,950
T69	(United States) Brandel Chamblee	70-72-72-76=290	+2	4,950
T69	(United States) Russ Cochran	70-73-78-69=290	+2	4,950
T69	(United States) Donnie Hammond	68-73-75-74=290	+2	4,950
T69	(United States) D. A. Weibring	75-69-70-76=290	+2	4,950
T74	(United States) Brad Bryant	75-69-75-72=291	+3	4,725
T74	(Scotland) Sandy Lyle (c)	71-72-71-77=291	+3	4,725
T74	(United States) Dick Mast	73-70-74-74=291	+3	4,725
T74	(United States) Tom Sieckmann	73-68-69-81=291	+3	4,725
T78	(United States) John Adams	72-70-76-74=292	+4	4,525
T78	(United States) Fred Funk	73-71-73-75=292	+4	4,525
T78	(United States) Greg Kraft	72-71-72-77=292	+4	4,525
T78	(United States) Corey Pavin	69-73-73-77=292	+4	4,525
82	(Japan) Masashi Ozaki	68-76-75-74=293	+5	4,400
83	(United States) Dan Forsman	67-77-73-77=294	+6	4,350
84	(United States) Robert Gamez	70-72-81-72=295	+7	4,300
85	(Zimbabwe) Denis Watson	74-69-80-74=297	+9	4,250
CUT	(Spain) Seve Ballesteros	74-71=145	+1	
CUT	(United States) Michael Bradley	72-73=145	+1	
CUT	(United States) Ed Dougherty	71-74=145	+1	
CUT	(United States) Bruce Fleisher	70-75=145	+1	
CUT	(United States) Bill Glasson	74-71=145	+1	
CUT	(United States) Dudley Hart	71-74=145	+1	
CUT	(United States) Ed Humenik	73-72=145	+1	
CUT	(United States) Tom Lehman	68-77=145	+1	
CUT	(United States) Blaine McCallister	70-75=145	+1	
CUT	(United States) Larry Mize	74-71=145	+1	
CUT	(United States) Ted Schulz	71-74=145	+1	
CUT	(United States) Payne Stewart	72-73=145	+1	
CUT	(United States) Mark Brooks	69-77=146	+2	
CUT	(United States) Billy Ray Brown	72-74=146	+2	
CUT	(United States) Scott Hoch	72-74=146	+2	
CUT	(United States) John Inman	71-75=146	+2	
CUT	(United States) Dan Pohl	76-70=146	+2	
CUT	(United States) Dave Rummells	74-72=146	+2	
CUT	(Australia) Peter Senior	72-74=146	+2	
CUT	(United States) Scott Simpson	71-75=146	+2	
CUT	(United States) Craig Stadler	72-74=146	+2	
CUT	(United States) Bob Tway	69-77=146	+2	
CUT	(United States) Duffy Waldorf	70-76=146	+2	
CUT	(United States) Willie Wood	73-73=146	+2	
CUT	(United States) Ronnie Black	75-72=147	+3	
CUT	(Namibia) Trevor Dodds	78-69=147	+3	
CUT	(United States) John Flannery	72-75=147	+3	
CUT	(South Africa) David Frost	70-77=147	+3	
CUT	(Zimbabwe) Mark McNulty	71-76=147	+3	
CUT	(United States) Jodie Mudd (c)	69-78=147	+3	
CUT	(United States) Mike Reid	74-73=147	+3	
CUT	(United States) Jeff Sluman	71-76=147	+3	
CUT	(Wales) Ian Woosnam	73-74=147	+3	
CUT	(United States) Billy Andrade	72-76=148	+4	
CUT	(United States) Kelly Gibson	73-75=148	+4	
CUT	(United States) Bruce Lietzke	78-70=148	+4	
CUT	(United States) David Ogrin	70-78=148	+4	
CUT	(Australia) Brett Ogle	77-72=149	+5	
CUT	(United States) Steve Pate	74-75=149	+5	
CUT	(Zimbabwe) Nick Price (c)	73-76=149	+5	
CUT	(United States) Phil Blackmar	77-73=150	+6	
CUT	(United States) Bob Lohr	74-76=150	+6	
CUT	(United States) Billy Mayfair	78-72=150	+6	
CUT	(United States) Tom Purtzer	73-77=150	+6	
CUT	(United States) David Toms	73-77=150	+6	
CUT	(United States) Marco Dawson	75-76=151	+7	
CUT	(United States) Ken Green	74-77=151	+7	
CUT	(United States) Larry Rinker	71-80=151	+7	
CUT	(United States) Doug Tewell	75-76=151	+7	
CUT	(United States) Lanny Wadkins (c)	73-78=151	+7	
CUT	(United States) Mark O'Meara	73-79=152	+8	
CUT	(United States) Curtis Strange	76-76=152	+8	
CUT	(United States) Peter Jacobsen	73-80=153	+9	
CUT	(Canada) Richard Zokol	75-78=153	+9	
CUT	(United States) John Daly	74-80=154	+10	
CUT	(United States) Brian Kamm	78-76=154	+10	
CUT	(United States) Greg Twiggs	80-77=157	+13	
WD	(United States) Hubert Green	76	+4	
WD	(United States) Calvin Peete (c)	85	+13	
