= 1992 Players Championship =

Tournament information
- Dates: March 26–29, 1992
- Location: Ponte Vedra Beach, Florida; 30.198°N 81.394°W
- Courses: TPC Sawgrass, Stadium Course
- Tour: PGA Tour

Statistics
- Par: 72
- Length: 6,896 yards (6,306 m)
- Field: 144 players, 73 after cut
- Cut: 144 (E)
- Prize fund: $1.8 million
- Winner's share: $324,000

Champion
- (United States) Davis Love III
- 273 (−15)

Location map
- Location in the United States Location in Florida

The 1992 Players Championship was a golf tournament in Florida on the PGA Tour, held March 26–29 at TPC Sawgrass in Ponte Vedra Beach.

== Tournament summary ==
It was the 19th Players Championship and was won by Davis Love III, four strokes ahead of runners-up Ian Baker-Finch, Phil Blackmar, Nick Faldo, and Tom Watson.

Playing in his seventh consecutive event on tour, top-ranked Fred Couples carded a course record 63 (−9) in the third round. He broke his own course record which he originally set in 1984. However, he followed it up with a two-over-par 74 and finished eight strokes back.

Defending champion Steve Elkington missed the 36-hole cut by two strokes.

== Venue ==
This was the eleventh Players Championship held at the TPC at Sawgrass Stadium Course in Ponte Vedra Beach.

== Eligibility requirements ==
1. The top 125 PGA Tour members from Final 1991 Official Money List.

Corey Pavin, Craig Stadler, Fred Couples, Tom Purtzer, Andrew Magee, Steve Pate, Nick Price, Davis Love III, Paul Azinger, Russ Cochran, Mark Brooks, Lanny Wadkins, Ian Baker-Finch, Billy Andrade, Rocco Mediate, Chip Beck, John Daly, Jim Gallagher Jr., Bruce Lietzke, Mark O'Meara, Jay Don Blake, D. A. Weibring, Jeff Sluman, Mike Hulbert, Steve Elkington, John Cook, Nolan Henke, Ted Schulz, Ian Woosnam, Payne Stewart, Kenny Knox, Hale Irwin, Brad Faxon, David Peoples, Blaine McCallister, Gene Sauers, David Edwards, Tom Kite, John Huston, Bob Lohr, Fuzzy Zoeller, José María Olazábal, Kenny Perry, Tom Watson, Billy Ray Brown, Hal Sutton, Curtis Strange, Jim Hallet, Mark Calcavecchia, Scott Simpson, Bob Tway, Greg Norman, Rick Fehr, Bill Britton, Loren Roberts, Robert Gamez, Larry Mize, Tom Sieckmann, Gary Hallberg, Dillard Pruitt, Peter Jacobsen, Ken Green, Bob Gilder, Brian Claar, Jeff Maggert, Keith Clearwater, Gil Morgan, Fulton Allem, Lee Janzen, Fred Funk, Howard Twitty, Ben Crenshaw, Phil Blackmar, Dan Forsman, Dave Rummells, Scott Gump, Bobby Wadkins, Ed Dougherty, Buddy Gardner, Jay Haas, Tim Simpson, Duffy Waldorf, Wayne Levi, Andy Bean, Billy Mayfair, Neal Lancaster, Mike Springer, Mark McCumber, David Frost, Joey Sindelar, Dan Pohl, Larry Nelson, Dan Halldorson, Mike Reid, Brad Bryant, Jay Delsing, Mike Smith, Jodie Mudd, Brad Fabel, Mark Lye, Bob Estes, Lance Ten Broeck, Bob Wolcott, Dave Barr, Robert Wrenn, Bill Sander, Doug Tewell, Kirk Triplett, Ronnie Black, Peter Persons, Stan Utley, Bobby Clampett, Nick Faldo, Wayne Grady, David Canipe, Dudley Hart, Ed Humenik, Ed Fiori, Bart Bryant, John Adams

2. Designated players.

Leonard Thompson, Phil Mickelson

3. Any foreign player meeting the requirements of a designated player, whether or not he is a PGA Tour member.

Seve Ballesteros, Bernhard Langer, Sandy Lyle

4. Winners in the last 10 calendar years of The Players Championship, Masters Tournament, U.S. Open, PGA Championship, and World Series of Golf.

Jerry Pate, Calvin Peete, Andy North, Roger Maltbie, Hubert Green, John Mahaffey

5. British Open winners since 1990.

6. Six players, not otherwise eligible, designated by The Players Championship Committee as "special selections."

Rodger Davis, Mike Harwood, Mark McNulty, Colin Montgomerie, Craig Parry, Chris Perry

7. To complete a field of 144 players those players in order, not otherwise eligible, from the 1992 Official Money List, as of the completion of the Nestle Invitational.

Tom Lehman, David Toms, Mark Wiebe, Jim Woodward, Chris Tucker, Larry Rinker

== Round summaries ==
=== First round ===
Thursday, March 26, 1992

| Place | Player | Score | To par |
|---|---|---|---|
| 1 | (United States) Billy Ray Brown | 64 | −8 |
| T2 | (United States) Phil Blackmar | 67 | −5 |
| T2 | (United States) Jay Don Blake | 67 | −5 |
| T2 | (United States) Mark Brooks | 67 | −5 |
| T2 | (United States) Ed Humenik | 67 | −5 |
| T2 | (United States) Davis Love III | 67 | −5 |
| T2 | (Australia) Craig Parry | 67 | −5 |
| T8 | (United States) John Daly | 68 | −4 |
| T8 | (England) Nick Faldo | 68 | −4 |
| T8 | (Germany) Bernhard Langer | 68 | −4 |
| T8 | (United States) Tom Purtzer | 68 | −4 |
| T8 | (United States) Scott Simpson | 68 | −4 |
| T8 | (United States) Tom Watson | 68 | −4 |

=== Second round ===
Friday, March 27, 1992

| Place | Player | Score | To par |
|---|---|---|---|
| T1 | (Spain) José María Olazábal | 69-65=134 | −10 |
| T1 | (United States) Billy Ray Brown | 64-70=134 | −10 |
| T3 | (United States) Davis Love III | 67-68=135 | −9 |
| T3 | (Australia) Craig Parry | 67-68=135 | −9 |
| T5 | (United States) Phil Blackmar | 67-69=136 | −8 |
| T5 | (England) Nick Faldo | 68-68=136 | −8 |
| T7 | (Australia) Ian Baker-Finch | 70-67=137 | −7 |
| T7 | (United States) Mark Brooks | 67-70=137 | −7 |
| T7 | (United States) Ed Humenik | 67-70=137 | −7 |
| T7 | (United States) Bob Lohr | 69-68=137 | −7 |
| T7 | (United States) Scott Simpson | 68-69=137 | −7 |

=== Third round ===
Saturday, March 28, 1992

| Place | Player | Score | To par |
|---|---|---|---|
| 1 | (England) Nick Faldo | 68-68-67=203 | −13 |
| 2 | (United States) Phil Blackmar | 67-69-68=204 | −12 |
| 3 | (Australia) Ian Baker-Finch | 70-67-68=205 | −11 |
| 4 | (United States) Davis Love III | 67-68-71=206 | −10 |
| T5 | (United States) Mark Brooks | 67-70-70=207 | −9 |
| T5 | (United States) Fred Couples | 73-71-63=207 | −9 |
| T5 | (Zimbabwe) Nick Price | 71-67-69=207 | −9 |
| T5 | (United States) Mike Smith | 69-72-66=207 | −9 |
| T9 | (Australia) Craig Parry | 67-68-73=208 | −8 |
| T9 | (United States) Doug Tewell | 69-69-70=208 | −8 |
| T9 | (United States) Tom Watson | 68-70-70=208 | −8 |

=== Final round ===
Sunday, March 29, 1992

Champion
(c) = past champion

| Place | Player | Score | To par | Money ($) |
|---|---|---|---|---|
| 1 | (United States) Davis Love III | 67-68-71-67=273 | −15 | 324,000 |
| T2 | (Australia) Ian Baker-Finch | 70-67-68-72=277 | −11 | 118,800 |
| T2 | (United States) Phil Blackmar | 67-69-68-73=277 | −11 | 118,800 |
| T2 | (England) Nick Faldo | 68-68-67-74=277 | −11 | 118,800 |
| T2 | (United States) Tom Watson | 68-70-70-69=277 | −11 | 118,800 |
| T6 | (Australia) Craig Parry | 67-68-73-70=278 | −10 | 62,550 |
| T6 | (United States) Tom Sieckmann | 71-72-67-68=278 | −10 | 62,550 |
| 8 | (Zimbabwe) Nick Price | 71-67-69-72=279 | −9 | 55,800 |
| T9 | (United States) Mark Brooks | 67-70-70-73=280 | −8 | 46,800 |
| T9 | (United States) John Mahaffey (c) | 71-71-69-69=280 | −8 | 46,800 |
| T9 | (Spain) José María Olazábal | 69-65-75-71=280 | −8 | 46,800 |
| T9 | (United States) Mark O'Meara | 69-69-74-68=280 | −8 | 46,800 |

Leaderboard below the top 10
| Place | Player | Score | To par | Money ($) |
|---|---|---|---|---|
| T13 | (United States) Fred Couples (c) | 73-71-63-74=281 | −7 | 33,750 |
| T13 | (United States) Tom Lehman | 70-72-71-68=281 | −7 | 33,750 |
| T13 | (Zimbabwe) Mark McNulty | 74-68-69-70=281 | −7 | 33,750 |
| T13 | (United States) Payne Stewart | 69-70-72-70=281 | −7 | 33,750 |
| T17 | (United States) Wayne Levi | 70-69-73-71=283 | −5 | 26,100 |
| T17 | (United States) Andrew Magee | 70-69-71-73=283 | −5 | 26,100 |
| T17 | (United States) Scott Simpson | 68-69-74-72=283 | −5 | 26,100 |
| T17 | (United States) Mike Smith | 69-72-66-76=283 | −5 | 26,100 |
| T21 | (United States) Billy Ray Brown | 64-70-78-72=284 | −4 | 16,897 |
| T21 | (United States) Rick Fehr | 70-72-69-73=284 | −4 | 16,897 |
| T21 | (United States) Ed Humenik | 67-70-77-70=284 | −4 | 16,897 |
| T21 | (United States) Bob Lohr | 69-68-74-73=284 | −4 | 16,897 |
| T21 | (United States) Larry Rinker | 72-69-69-74=284 | −4 | 16,897 |
| T21 | (United States) Loren Roberts | 69-71-73-71=284 | −4 | 16,897 |
| T21 | (United States) Tim Simpson | 69-71-73-71=284 | −4 | 16,897 |
| T21 | (United States) Doug Tewell | 69-69-70-76=284 | −4 | 16,897 |
| T29 | (United States) Paul Azinger | 69-72-73-71=285 | −3 | 11,445 |
| T29 | (United States) Ronnie Black | 71-72-73-69=285 | −3 | 11,445 |
| T29 | (United States) Ben Crenshaw | 70-72-73-70=285 | −3 | 11,445 |
| T29 | (Australia) Wayne Grady | 71-73-69-72=285 | −3 | 11,445 |
| T29 | (Germany) Bernhard Langer | 68-74-70-73=285 | −3 | 11,445 |
| T29 | (United States) Lanny Wadkins (c) | 70-71-75-69=285 | −3 | 11,445 |
| T35 | (United States) David Edwards | 69-72-71-74=286 | −2 | 8,874 |
| T35 | (United States) Tom Kite (c) | 72-68-74-72=286 | −2 | 8,874 |
| T35 | (Australia) Greg Norman | 72-72-70-72=286 | −2 | 8,874 |
| T35 | (United States) Dan Pohl | 70-74-70-72=286 | −2 | 8,874 |
| T35 | (United States) Duffy Waldorf | 72-72-70-72=286 | −2 | 8,874 |
| T40 | (United States) Jay Don Blake | 67-71-76-73=287 | −1 | 6,840 |
| T40 | (United States) John Huston | 69-69-78-71=287 | −1 | 6,840 |
| T40 | (United States) Neal Lancaster | 69-75-72-71=287 | −1 | 6,840 |
| T40 | (United States) Mark McCumber (c) | 71-69-74-73=287 | −1 | 6,840 |
| T40 | (United States) Steve Pate | 74-70-71-72=287 | −1 | 6,840 |
| T40 | (United States) Jeff Sluman | 73-67-73-74=287 | −1 | 6,840 |
| T46 | (United States) Bruce Lietzke | 72-72-71-73=288 | E | 5,244 |
| T46 | (United States) Corey Pavin | 71-73-71-73=288 | E | 5,244 |
| T46 | (United States) Joey Sindelar | 69-72-72-75=288 | E | 5,244 |
| T49 | (United States) Chip Beck | 71-67-81-70=289 | +1 | 4,442 |
| T49 | (United States) Brian Claar | 74-70-72-73=289 | +1 | 4,442 |
| T49 | (United States) Russ Cochran | 71-73-72-73=289 | +1 | 4,442 |
| T49 | (United States) Dave Rummells | 69-75-75-70=289 | +1 | 4,442 |
| T49 | (United States) Robert Wrenn | 70-73-71-75=289 | +1 | 4,442 |
| T54 | (United States) Ed Dougherty | 73-71-75-71=290 | +2 | 4,086 |
| T54 | (United States) Brad Fabel | 76-68-72-74=290 | +2 | 4,086 |
| T54 | (United States) Jeff Maggert | 69-71-77-73=290 | +2 | 4,086 |
| T54 | (United States) Blaine McCallister | 69-73-75-73=290 | +2 | 4,086 |
| T54 | (United States) Larry Mize | 73-70-75-72=290 | +2 | 4,086 |
| T54 | (United States) Leonard Thompson | 71-73-73-73=290 | +2 | 4,086 |
| T60 | (Canada) Dave Barr | 71-70-78-72=291 | +3 | 3,924 |
| T60 | (United States) Fred Funk | 72-72-74-73=291 | +3 | 3,924 |
| T60 | (United States) Jim Gallagher Jr. | 71-71-75-74=291 | +3 | 3,924 |
| 63 | (United States) Dan Forsman | 73-71-77-71=292 | +4 | 3,852 |
| T64 | (Canada) Dan Halldorson | 74-69-76-74=293 | +5 | 3,798 |
| T64 | (United States) Fuzzy Zoeller | 70-71-76-76=293 | +5 | 3,798 |
| 66 | (United States) Scott Gump | 69-74-74-77=294 | +6 | 3,744 |
| T67 | (United States) Brad Faxon | 71-73-73-78=295 | +7 | 3,690 |
| T67 | (United States) Billy Mayfair | 73-70-76-76=295 | +7 | 3,690 |
| 69 | (United States) Stan Utley | 70-73-77-76=296 | +8 | 3,636 |
| T70 | (United States) Bob Estes | 73-71-76-78=298 | +10 | 3,582 |
| T70 | (United States) Bob Tway | 69-74-83-72=298 | +10 | 3,582 |
| 72 | (United States) John Daly | 68-75-78-80=301 | +13 | 3,528 |
| 73 | (United States) Mark Calcavecchia | 71-73-78-81=303 | +15 | 3,492 |
| CUT | (United States) Keith Clearwater | 72-73=145 | +1 | |
| CUT | (United States) John Cook | 76-69=145 | +1 | |
| CUT | (United States) Jay Delsing | 75-70=145 | +1 | |
| CUT | (United States) Buddy Gardner | 74-71=145 | +1 | |
| CUT | (United States) Mike Hulbert | 71-74=145 | +1 | |
| CUT | (United States) Kenny Knox | 75-70=145 | +1 | |
| CUT | (United States) Gil Morgan | 72-73=145 | +1 | |
| CUT | (United States) Jodie Mudd (c) | 71-74=145 | +1 | |
| CUT | (United States) Tom Purtzer | 68-77=145 | +1 | |
| CUT | (United States) Bill Sander | 69-76=145 | +1 | |
| CUT | (United States) Ted Schulz | 71-74=145 | +1 | |
| CUT | (South Africa) Fulton Allem | 74-72=146 | +2 | |
| CUT | (Spain) Seve Ballesteros | 75-71=146 | +2 | |
| CUT | (Australia) Steve Elkington (c) | 71-75=146 | +2 | |
| CUT | (United States) Bruce Fleisher | 74-72=146 | +2 | |
| CUT | (United States) Phil Mickelson | 75-71=146 | +2 | |
| CUT | (United States) David Peoples | 74-72=146 | +2 | |
| CUT | (United States) Kirk Triplett | 75-71=146 | +2 | |
| CUT | (United States) Bobby Wadkins | 75-71=146 | +2 | |
| CUT | (Wales) Ian Woosnam | 75-71=146 | +2 | |
| CUT | (United States) Bart Bryant | 72-75=147 | +3 | |
| CUT | (United States) Ed Fiori | 74-73=147 | +3 | |
| CUT | (United States) Dudley Hart | 72-75=147 | +3 | |
| CUT | (Australia) Mike Harwood | 69-78=147 | +3 | |
| CUT | (United States) Hale Irwin | 75-72=147 | +3 | |
| CUT | (United States) Rocco Mediate | 75-72=147 | +3 | |
| CUT | (United States) Jerry Pate (c) | 76-71=147 | +3 | |
| CUT | (United States) Chris Perry | 72-75=147 | +3 | |
| CUT | (United States) Mike Reid | 71-76=147 | +3 | |
| CUT | (United States) Mike Springer | 73-74=147 | +3 | |
| CUT | (United States) Craig Stadler | 70-77=147 | +3 | |
| CUT | (United States) Howard Twitty | 71-76=147 | +3 | |
| CUT | (United States) Bill Britton | 73-75=148 | +4 | |
| CUT | (Australia) Rodger Davis | 73-75=148 | +4 | |
| CUT | (United States) Robert Gamez | 74-74=148 | +4 | |
| CUT | (United States) Jim Hallet | 71-77=148 | +4 | |
| CUT | (United States) Nolan Henke | 74-74=148 | +4 | |
| CUT | (Scotland) Sandy Lyle (c) | 71-77=148 | +4 | |
| CUT | (United States) Roger Maltbie | 77-71=148 | +4 | |
| CUT | (United States) D. A. Weibring | 75-73=148 | +4 | |
| CUT | (United States) John Adams | 78-71=149 | +5 | |
| CUT | (United States) Billy Andrade | 74-75=149 | +5 | |
| CUT | (United States) Bobby Clampett | 76-73=149 | +5 | |
| CUT | (United States) Jay Haas | 72-77=149 | +5 | |
| CUT | (United States) Lee Janzen | 73-76=149 | +5 | |
| CUT | (United States) Andy North | 72-77=149 | +5 | |
| CUT | (United States) Dillard Pruitt | 71-78=149 | +5 | |
| CUT | (United States) Mark Wiebe | 75-74=149 | +5 | |
| CUT | (United States) Peter Persons | 75-75=150 | +6 | |
| CUT | (United States) Lance Ten Broeck | 78-72=150 | +6 | |
| CUT | (United States) David Toms | 76-74=150 | +6 | |
| CUT | (United States) Jim Woodward | 79-71=150 | +6 | |
| CUT | (South Africa) David Frost | 74-77=151 | +7 | |
| CUT | (United States) Bob Gilder | 76-75=151 | +7 | |
| CUT | (United States) Gene Sauers | 75-76=151 | +7 | |
| CUT | (United States) Hal Sutton (c) | 79-72=151 | +7 | |
| CUT | (United States) Brad Bryant | 74-78=152 | +8 | |
| CUT | (United States) Chris Tucker | 74-78=152 | +8 | |
| CUT | (United States) Andy Bean | 82-71=153 | +9 | |
| CUT | (United States) Gary Hallberg | 74-79=153 | +9 | |
| CUT | (United States) Larry Nelson | 74-79=153 | +9 | |
| CUT | (United States) Hubert Green | 78-76=154 | +10 | |
| CUT | (United States) Bob Wolcott | 78-76=154 | +10 | |
| CUT | (Scotland) Colin Montgomerie | 79-76=155 | +11 | |
| CUT | (United States) Peter Jacobsen | 81-75=156 | +12 | |
| WD | (United States) Kenny Perry | 74-80=154 | +10 | |
| WD | (United States) Mark Lye | 73-84=157 | +13 | |
| WD | (United States) David Canipe | 85-78=163 | +19 | |
| WD | (United States) Calvin Peete (c) | 80-85=165 | +21 | |
| WD | (United States) Curtis Strange | 77 | +5 | |
| DQ | (United States) Ken Green | 70 | −2 | |
