= 1992 PGA Tour =

Golf tour season

1992 PGA Tour season
- Duration: January 9, 1992 – November 1, 1992
- Number of official events: 44
- Most wins: (United States) John Cook (3) (United States) Fred Couples (3) (United States) Davis Love III (3)
- Money list: (United States) Fred Couples
- PGA Tour Player of the Year: (United States) Fred Couples
- PGA Player of the Year: (United States) Fred Couples
- Rookie of the Year: (United States) Mark Carnevale

The 1992 PGA Tour was the 77th season of the PGA Tour, the main professional golf tour in the United States. It was also the 24th season since separating from the PGA of America.

== Schedule ==
The following table lists official events during the 1992 season.

Date	Tournament	Location	Purse (US$)	Winner (Note: The number in parentheses after each winner's name is the number of PGA Tour events they had won up to and including that tournament. This information is only shown for PGA Tour members.)	OWGR points	Notes
Jan 12	Infiniti Tournament of Champions	California	800,000	(Australia) Steve Elkington (3)	44	Winners-only event
Jan 19	Bob Hope Chrysler Classic	California	1,100,000	(United States) John Cook (4)	46	Pro-Am
Jan 26	Phoenix Open	Arizona	1,000,000	(United States) Mark Calcavecchia (7)	46	
Feb 2	AT&T Pebble Beach National Pro-Am	California	1,100,000	(United States) Mark O'Meara (8)	52	Pro-Am
Feb 9	United Airlines Hawaiian Open	Hawaii	1,200,000	(United States) John Cook (5)	42	
Feb 16	Northern Telecom Open	Arizona	1,100,000	(United States) Lee Janzen (1)	40	
Feb 23	Buick Invitational of California	California	1,000,000	(United States) Steve Pate (5)	34	
Mar 1	Nissan Los Angeles Open	California	1,000,000	(United States) Fred Couples (7)	48	
Mar 8	Doral-Ryder Open	Florida	1,400,000	(United States) Raymond Floyd (22)	52	
Mar 15	Honda Classic	Florida	1,100,000	(United States) Corey Pavin (10)	48	
Mar 22	Nestle Invitational	Florida	1,000,000	(United States) Fred Couples (8)	70	Invitational
Mar 29	The Players Championship	Florida	1,800,000	(United States) Davis Love III (4)	80	Flagship event
Apr 5	Freeport-McMoRan Golf Classic	Louisiana	1,000,000	(United States) Chip Beck (4)	54	
Apr 12	Masters Tournament	Georgia	1,500,000	(United States) Fred Couples (9)	100	Major championship
Apr 12	Deposit Guaranty Golf Classic	Mississippi	300,000	(Canada) Richard Zokol (n/a)	n/a	Alternate event (Note: Official money; unofficial win.)
Apr 19	MCI Heritage Golf Classic	South Carolina	1,000,000	(United States) Davis Love III (5)	52	Invitational
Apr 26	KMart Greater Greensboro Open	North Carolina	1,250,000	(United States) Davis Love III (6)	52	
May 3	Shell Houston Open	Texas	1,200,000	(United States) Fred Funk (1)	44	
May 10	BellSouth Classic	Georgia	1,000,000	(United States) Tom Kite (16)	38	
May 17	GTE Byron Nelson Golf Classic	Texas	1,100,000	(United States) Billy Ray Brown (2)	40	
May 24	Southwestern Bell Colonial	Texas	1,300,000	(United States) Bruce Lietzke (12)	54	Invitational
May 31	Kemper Open	Maryland	1,100,000	(United States) Bill Glasson (5)	40	
Jun 7	Memorial Tournament	Ohio	1,300,000	(United States) David Edwards (3)	60	Invitational
Jun 14	Federal Express St. Jude Classic	Tennessee	1,100,000	(United States) Jay Haas (8)	54	
Jun 21	U.S. Open	California	1,500,000	(United States) Tom Kite (17)	100	Major championship
Jun 28	Buick Classic	New York	1,000,000	(South Africa) David Frost (5)	50	
Jul 5	Centel Western Open	Illinois	1,100,000	(United States) Ben Crenshaw (16)	50	
Jul 12	Anheuser-Busch Golf Classic	Virginia	1,100,000	(United States) David Peoples (2)	28	
Jul 19	The Open Championship	Scotland	£1,000,000	(England) Nick Faldo (6)	100	Major championship (Note: Unofficial money event at the time, but retrospectively counted as an official win.)
Jul 19	Chattanooga Classic	Tennessee	800,000	(United States) Mark Carnevale (1)	20	Alternate event
Jul 26	New England Classic	Massachusetts	1,000,000	(United States) Brad Faxon (2)	36	
Aug 2	Canon Greater Hartford Open	Connecticut	1,000,000	(United States) Lanny Wadkins (21)	42	
Aug 9	Buick Open	Michigan	1,000,000	(United States) Dan Forsman (4)	42	
Aug 16	PGA Championship	Missouri	1,600,000	(Zimbabwe) Nick Price (4)	100	Major championship
Aug 23	The International	Colorado	1,200,000	(United States) Brad Faxon (3)	48	
Aug 30	NEC World Series of Golf	Ohio	1,400,000	(United States) Craig Stadler (10)	50	Limited-field event
Sep 6	Greater Milwaukee Open	Wisconsin	1,000,000	(Canada) Richard Zokol (1)	40	
Sep 13	Canadian Open	Canada	1,000,000	(Australia) Greg Norman (11)	48	
Sep 20	Hardee's Golf Classic	Illinois	1,000,000	(South Africa) David Frost (6)	34	
Sep 27	B.C. Open	New York	800,000	(United States) John Daly (2)	32	
Oct 4	Buick Southern Open	Georgia	700,000	(United States) Gary Hallberg (3)	26	
Oct 11	Las Vegas Invitational	Nevada	1,300,000	(United States) John Cook (6)	46	
Oct 18	Walt Disney World/Oldsmobile Classic	Florida	1,000,000	(United States) John Huston (2)	44	
Oct 25	H.E.B. Texas Open	Texas	900,000	(Zimbabwe) Nick Price (5)	42	
Nov 1	The Tour Championship	North Carolina	2,000,000	(United States) Paul Azinger (8)	54	Tour Championship

=== Unofficial events ===
The following events were sanctioned by the PGA Tour, but did not carry official money, nor were wins official.

Date	Tournament	Location	Purse ($)	Winner(s)	OWGR points	Notes
Nov 8	World Cup	Spain	1,100,000	(United States) Fred Couples and (United States) Davis Love III	n/a	Team event
Nov 8	World Cup Individual Trophy	Spain	1,100,000	(Australia) Brett Ogle	n/a	
Nov 8	Amoco-Centel Championship	South Carolina	760,000	(United States) Don Pooley	n/a	
Nov 11	PGA Grand Slam of Golf	California	1,000,000	(Zimbabwe) Nick Price	n/a	Limited-field event
Nov 15	Franklin Funds Shark Shootout	California	1,000,000	(United States) Tom Kite and (United States) Davis Love III	n/a	Team event
Nov 22	Kapalua International	Hawaii	800,000	(United States) Davis Love III	38	
Nov 29	Skins Game	California	540,000	(United States) Payne Stewart	n/a	Limited-field event
Dec 6	JCPenney Classic	Florida	1,100,000	(United States) Dan Forsman and (United States) Dottie Mochrie	n/a	Team event

== Money list ==
The money list was based on prize money won during the season, calculated in U.S. dollars.

Position	Player	Prize money ($)
1	(United States) Fred Couples	1,344,188
2	(United States) Davis Love III	1,191,630
3	(United States) John Cook	1,165,606
4	(Zimbabwe) Nick Price	1,135,773
5	(United States) Corey Pavin	980,934
6	(United States) Tom Kite	957,445
7	(United States) Paul Azinger	929,863
8	(United States) Brad Faxon	812,093
9	(United States) Lee Janzen	795,279
10	(United States) Dan Forsman	763,190

== Awards ==
Award	Winner	Ref.
PGA Tour Player of the Year (Jack Nicklaus Trophy)	(United States) Fred Couples	
PGA Player of the Year	(United States) Fred Couples	
Rookie of the Year	(United States) Mark Carnevale	
Scoring leader (PGA Tour – Byron Nelson Award)	(United States) Fred Couples	
Scoring leader (PGA – Vardon Trophy)	(United States) Fred Couples	
Comeback Player of the Year	(United States) John Cook	

== See also ==
- 1992 Ben Hogan Tour
- 1992 Senior PGA Tour
