= 1989 PGA Tour Qualifying School graduates =

This is a list of the 1989 PGA Tour Qualifying School graduates. 59 players earned their 1990 PGA Tour card through Q-School in 1989.

Place	Player	Notes
1	(United States) David Peoples	
2	(United States) Tommy Moore	
3	(United States) Jerry Haas	
4	(United States) David Canipe	
T5	(United States) Emlyn Aubrey	1 Asia Golf Circuit win
T5	(United States) Bob Eastwood	3 PGA Tour wins
7	(United States) Ray Barr Jr.	
8	(United States) Jim Woodward	
9	(United States) Fred Funk	
T10	(United States) Michael Allen	1 European Tour win
T10	(United States) Greg Bruckner	1 Asia Golf Circuit win
T10	(United States) Patrick Burke	
T10	(United States) Jay Delsing	
T10	(United States) Dennis Harrington	
T10	(United States) Greg Hickman	
T10	(United States) Lee Janzen	
T10	(United States) Peter Persons	
T18	(United States) Ed Dougherty	
T18	(United States) Neal Lancaster	
T20	(United States) Bill Buttner	
T20	(United States) Tom Eubank	
T20	(United States) Brian Kamm	
T20	(United States) Steve LaMontagne	
T20	(United States) Tony Sills	
T20	(United States) Sonny Skinner	
T20	(Canada) Rick Todd	
T20	(New Zealand) Grant Waite	
T20	(United States) Jeff Wilson	
T20	(United States) Bob Wolcott	
T30	(United States) Steve Hart	
T30	(United States) Mike Schuchart	
T30	(United States) Kirk Triplett	2 Canadian Tour wins
T33	(United States) Carl Cooper	
T33	(United States) Rick Fehr	1 PGA Tour win
T33	(United States) Pat Fitzsimons	1 PGA Tour win
T33	(United States) Mark Hayes	3 PGA Tour wins
T37	(Canada) Jerry Anderson	1 European Tour win
T37	(United States) Dewey Arnette	
T37	(United States) Joel Edwards	
T37	(United States) Robert Gamez	
T37	(United States) Nolan Henke	
T37	(United States) Sean Murphy	
T37	(United States) Dillard Pruitt	
T37	(United States) Tom Silva	
T37	(United States) Larry Silveira	
T37	(United States) Mike Smith	
T37	(United States) Harry Taylor	
T48	(United States) Mitch Adcock	
T48	(United States) Lennie Clements	
T50	(United States) Brian Claar	2 Asia Golf Circuit wins
T50	(United States) Clark Dennis	
T50	(United States) John Dowall	
T50	(United States) Brad Fabel	
T50	(United States) Jack Ferenz	
T50	(United States) Jeff Hart	
T50	(United States) P. H. Horgan III	
T50	(United States) Paul Trittler	
T50	(United States) Ted Tryba	
T50	(Canada) Richard Zokol	1 Canadian Tour win
