= The Byron Nelson =

Golf tournament in Texas on the PGA Tour

Coordinates: 33.141°N 96.720°W

Tournament information
- Location: McKinney, Texas
- Established: 1944
- Course: TPC Craig Ranch
- Par: 71
- Length: 7,569 yards (6,921 m)
- Organized by: Salesmanship Club of Dallas
- Tour: PGA Tour
- Format: Stroke play
- Prize fund: $10,300,000
- Month played: May
- Website: thecjcupbyronnelson.org

Tournament record score
- Aggregate: 253 Scottie Scheffler (2025)
- To par: −31 as above

Current champion
- (United States) Wyndham Clark

Location map
- Location in the United States Location in Texas

The Byron Nelson is a golf tournament in Texas on the PGA Tour, currently hosted by TPC Craig Ranch in McKinney, northeast of Dallas. Held in May, it is one of two PGA Tour stops in the Dallas-Fort Worth Metroplex – which until the 2020–21 PGA Tour, was the only metropolitan area to host two events on separate courses in the area (Las Vegas and Savannah have since hosted two events on two separate courses, both of which were pandemic-related changes). The tournament is the leading fundraiser for charity on the PGA Tour and has raised more than $143 million. For much of its history, it was the only PGA Tour stop named after a professional golfer, and remains one of only two such events, along with the Arnold Palmer Invitational. As host, Byron Nelson (1912–2006) commonly made appearances during the tournament. It is hosted by the Salesmanship Club of Dallas, a 600-member civic organization, and has benefited the club's nonprofit Momentous Institute since its inception.

For its first several decades, the tournament was played at various courses in Dallas. Nelson, a Texas native raised in Fort Worth, was the tournament's first winner in 1944, when it was played at Lakewood Country Club. The following year it was played at Dallas Country Club, and then in 1946 moved to Brook Hollow Golf Club. For the better part of the next decade the event was not contested, until two iterations of it were held in 1956, both at Preston Hollow Country Club. In 1957, the event moved to Glen Lake Country Club before it began a decade-long relationship with Oak Cliff Country Club, from 1958 to 1967.

In 1968, the event was renamed the Byron Nelson Golf Classic and its title, through a series of sponsors, has continuously included Nelson's name. That same year the event moved to Preston Trail Golf Club, where it was played through 1982, then moved to venues in Irving: Las Colinas Sports Club (1983–1985) and TPC at Las Colinas (1986–1993).

Beginning in 1994, the tournament was played at two courses, the Tournament Players Course and the Cottonwood Valley Course, both located at the Four Seasons. Previously only the TPC was used, but since the tournament was played in May (during the height of the North Texas storm season), the weather played havoc with the tournament in some years, causing several delays and shortened tournaments. Therefore, the decision was made to add the Cottonwood Valley course in order to shorten the amount of time needed to complete the first two rounds. The first two rounds were played on both courses (each player played one round on each course); after the cut was determined, the TPC is used exclusively for the final two rounds. However, in 2008 the tournament reverted to using only the TPC course, which was significantly renovated.

Hewlett-Packard (HP) bought the previous title sponsor, Electronic Data Systems (EDS) in mid-2008. The agreement ran through 2014, with AT&T becoming the title sponsor in 2015. The tournament moved from the Four Seasons course in Irving to the new Trinity Forest Golf Club, southeast of downtown Dallas, in 2018. Not played in 2020 due to the COVID-19 pandemic, it moved north to TPC Craig Ranch in McKinney in 2021. In 2024, CJ Group replaced AT&T as title sponsor under a ten-year agreement, rebranding it as the CJ Cup Byron Nelson (reusing a title previously used for a former fall event hosted in South Korea and later the aforementioned replacement events in Las Vegas and Savannah).

== Tournament highlights ==
- 1956: Peter Thomson, a five-time winner of The Open Championship shoots a final round 63, then makes birdie on the first two holes of sudden death to defeat Gene Littler and Cary Middlecoff. It was his one and only PGA Tour victory in the United States.
- 1970: Jack Nicklaus defeated Arnold Palmer in a sudden-death playoff.
- 1976: Mark Hayes becomes the first wire-to-wire winner of the Nelson.
- 1981: Bruce Lietzke defeated Tom Watson in a playoff, spoiling Watson's bid for a fourth straight Nelson triumph.
- 1985: Bob Eastwood defeated Payne Stewart in a playoff after coming to the 72nd hole trailing Stewart by three shots. Eastwood made birdie on the final hole while Stewart made double bogey. Stewart made yet another double bogey on the first hole of sudden death to give Eastwood the title.
- 1994: Neal Lancaster won the first ever six-player sudden death playoff in PGA Tour history. He made a birdie on the first playoff hole to defeat Tom Byrum, Mark Carnevale, David Edwards, Yoshi Mizumaki, and David Ogrin. Despite being shortened to 36 holes due to weather, the rules at the time made the event official and gave Lancaster his only PGA Tour win.
- 2005: Tiger Woods' record streak of 142 cuts made came to an end at this tournament.
- 2006: After graduating from Q school, Brett Wetterich's win propels him to a surprise Ryder Cup appearance.
- 2008: Australian Adam Scott sank a 48-foot (15 m) putt on the third playoff hole to clinch victory over American Ryan Moore.
- 2010: At age 16, Jordan Spieth (the defending U.S. Junior Amateur champion, and a high school junior at nearby Jesuit College Preparatory School) became the youngest player to play in the tournament, courtesy of a sponsor's exemption (the first one granted since 1995). Spieth made the cut (becoming the sixth-youngest person in PGA Tour history to make a professional tour event cut) and finished in sixteenth place. (The next year, he was granted another sponsor's exemption, made the cut, and finished in 32nd place.)
- 2013: Keegan Bradley hits a course-record 60 (−10) in the first round, leads after each of the first three rounds, but Bae Sang-moon earned the win.
- 2018: Aaron Wise sets the tournament record.
- 2019: Kang Sung-hoon won his first PGA Tour title in his 159th start. Scott Piercy went bogey-free for the entire tournament, becoming the first to do so in a 72-hole PGA Tour event since Charles Howell III at the 2010 Greenbrier Classic.

== Winners ==
Year	Winner	Score	To par	Margin of victory	Runner(s)-up	Purse (US$)	Winner's share ($)	Ref.
CJ Cup Byron Nelson
2026	(United States) Wyndham Clark	254	−30	3 strokes	(South Korea) Kim Si-woo	10,300,000	1,854,000	
2025	(United States) Scottie Scheffler	253	−31	8 strokes	(South Africa) Erik van Rooyen	9,900,000	1,782,000	
2024	(Canada) Taylor Pendrith	261	−23	1 stroke	(United States) Ben Kohles	9,500,000	1,710,000	
AT&T Byron Nelson
2023	(Australia) Jason Day (2)	261	−23	1 stroke	(United States) Austin Eckroat (South Korea) Kim Si-woo	9,500,000	1,710,000	
2022	(South Korea) Lee Kyoung-hoon (2)	262	−26	1 stroke	(United States) Jordan Spieth	9,100,000	1,638,000	
2021	(South Korea) Lee Kyoung-hoon	263	−25	3 strokes	(United States) Sam Burns	8,100,000	1,458,000	
2020	Canceled due to the COVID-19 pandemic							
2019	(South Korea) Kang Sung-hoon	261	−23	2 strokes	(United States) Matt Every (United States) Scott Piercy	7,900,000	1,422,000	
2018	(United States) Aaron Wise	261	−23	3 strokes	(Australia) Marc Leishman	7,700,000	1,386,000	
2017	(United States) Billy Horschel	268	−12	Playoff	(Australia) Jason Day	7,500,000	1,350,000	
2016	(Spain) Sergio García (2)	265	−15	Playoff	(United States) Brooks Koepka	7,300,000	1,314,000	
2015	(Australia) Steven Bowditch	259 (Note: The par for the final three rounds was lowered to 69 due to course flooding; the 14th hole was converted to a par 3. Aggregate score not considered as an official record.)	−18	4 strokes	(United States) Charley Hoffman (United States) Scott Pinckney (United States) Jimmy Walker	7,100,000	1,278,000	
HP Byron Nelson Championship
2014	(United States) Brendon Todd	266	−14	2 strokes	(Canada) Mike Weir	6,900,000	1,242,000	
2013	(South Korea) Bae Sang-moon	267	−13	2 strokes	(United States) Keegan Bradley	6,700,000	1,206,000	
2012	(United States) Jason Dufner	269	−11	1 stroke	(United States) Dicky Pride	6,500,000	1,170,000	
2011	(United States) Keegan Bradley	277	−3	Playoff	(United States) Ryan Palmer	6,500,000	1,170,000	
2010	(Australia) Jason Day	270	−10	2 strokes	(United States) Blake Adams (United States) Brian Gay (United States) Jeff Overton	6,500,000	1,170,000	
2009	(South Africa) Rory Sabbatini	261	−19	2 strokes	(England) Brian Davis	6,500,000	1,170,000	
EDS Byron Nelson Championship
2008	(Australia) Adam Scott	273	−7	Playoff	(United States) Ryan Moore	6,400,000	1,152,000	
2007	(United States) Scott Verplank	267	−13	1 stroke	(England) Luke Donald	6,300,000	1,134,000	
2006	(United States) Brett Wetterich	268	−12	1 stroke	(South Africa) Trevor Immelman	6,200,000	1,116,000	
2005	(United States) Ted Purdy	265	−15	1 stroke	(United States) Sean O'Hair	6,200,000	1,116,000	
2004	(Spain) Sergio García	270	−10	Playoff	(United States) Robert Damron (United States) Dudley Hart	5,800,000	1,044,000	
2003	(Fiji) Vijay Singh	265	−15	2 strokes	(Zimbabwe) Nick Price	5,600,000	1,008,000	
Verizon Byron Nelson Classic
2002	(Japan) Shigeki Maruyama	266	−14	2 strokes	(United States) Ben Crane	4,800,000	864,000	
2001	(United States) Robert Damron	263	−17	Playoff	(United States) Scott Verplank	4,500,000	810,000	
GTE Byron Nelson Classic
2000	(Sweden) Jesper Parnevik	269	−11	Playoff	(United States) Davis Love III (United States) Phil Mickelson	4,000,000	720,000	
1999	(United States) Loren Roberts	262	−18	Playoff	(United States) Steve Pate	3,000,000	540,000	
GTE Byron Nelson Golf Classic
1998	(United States) John Cook	265	−15	3 strokes	(United States) Fred Couples (United States) Harrison Frazar (United States) Hal Sutton	2,500,000	450,000	
1997	(United States) Tiger Woods	263	−17	2 strokes	(United States) Lee Rinker	1,800,000	324,000	
1996	(United States) Phil Mickelson	265	−15	2 strokes	(Australia) Craig Parry	1,500,000	270,000	
1995	(South Africa) Ernie Els	263	−17	3 strokes	(United States) Robin Freeman (United States) Mike Heinen (United States) D. A. Weibring	1,300,000	234,000	
1994	(United States) Neal Lancaster	132 (Note: Shortened to 36 holes due to weather.)	−9	Playoff	(United States) Tom Byrum (United States) Mark Carnevale (United States) David Edwards (Japan) Yoshi Mizumaki (United States) David Ogrin	1,200,000	216,000	
1993	(United States) Scott Simpson	270	−10	1 stroke	(United States) Billy Mayfair (United States) Corey Pavin (United States) D. A. Weibring	1,200,000	216,000	
1992	(United States) Billy Ray Brown	199 (Note: Shortened to 54 holes due to weather.)	−11	Playoff	(United States) Ben Crenshaw (United States) Raymond Floyd (United States) Bruce Lietzke	1,100,000	198,000	
1991	(Zimbabwe) Nick Price	270	−10	1 stroke	(United States) Craig Stadler	1,100,000	198,000	
1990	(United States) Payne Stewart	202	−8	2 strokes	(United States) Lanny Wadkins	1,000,000	180,000	
1989	(United States) Jodie Mudd	265	−15	Playoff	(United States) Larry Nelson	1,000,000	180,000	
1988	(United States) Bruce Lietzke (2)	271	−9	Playoff	(United States) Clarence Rose	750,000	135,000	
Byron Nelson Golf Classic
1987	(United States) Fred Couples	266	−14	Playoff	(United States) Mark Calcavecchia	600,000	108,000	
1986	(United States) Andy Bean	269	−11	1 stroke	(United States) Mark Wiebe	600,000	108,000	
1985	(United States) Bob Eastwood	272	−8	Playoff	(United States) Payne Stewart	500,000	90,000	
1984	(United States) Craig Stadler	276	−8	1 stroke	(United States) David Edwards	500,000	90,000	
1983	(United States) Ben Crenshaw	273	−7	1 stroke	(United States) Brad Bryant (United States) Hal Sutton	400,000	72,000	
1982	(United States) Bob Gilder	266	−14	5 strokes	(United States) Curtis Strange	350,000	63,000	
1981	(United States) Bruce Lietzke	281	+1	Playoff	(United States) Tom Watson	300,000	54,000	
1980	(United States) Tom Watson (4)	274	−6	1 stroke	(United States) Bill Rogers	300,000	54,000	
1979	(United States) Tom Watson (3)	275	−5	Playoff	(United States) Bill Rogers	300,000	54,000	
1978	(United States) Tom Watson (2)	272	−8	1 stroke	(United States) Lee Trevino	200,000	40,000	
1977	(United States) Raymond Floyd	276	−8	2 strokes	(United States) Ben Crenshaw	200,000	40,000	
1976	(United States) Mark Hayes	273	−11	2 strokes	(United States) Don Bies	200,000	40,000	
1975	(United States) Tom Watson	269	−15	2 strokes	(United States) Bob E. Smith	175,000	35,000	
1974	(United States) Buddy Allin	269	−15	4 strokes	(United States) Homero Blancas (United States) Charles Coody (United States) Lee Trevino (United States) Tom Watson	150,000	30,000	
1973	(United States) Lanny Wadkins	277	−3	Playoff	(United States) Dan Sikes	150,000	30,000	
1972	(United States) Chi-Chi Rodríguez	273	−7	Playoff	(United States) Billy Casper	125,000	25,000	
1971	(United States) Jack Nicklaus (2)	274	−6	2 strokes	(United States) Frank Beard (United States) Jerry McGee	125,000	25,000	
1970	(United States) Jack Nicklaus	274	−6	Playoff	(United States) Arnold Palmer	100,000	20,000	
1969	(Australia) Bruce Devlin	277	−3	1 stroke	(United States) Frank Beard (Australia) Bruce Crampton	100,000	20,000	
1968	(United States) Miller Barber	270	−10	1 stroke	(United States) Kermit Zarley	100,000	20,000	
Dallas Open Invitational
1967	(United States) Bert Yancey	274	−10	1 stroke	(Argentina) Roberto De Vicenzo (United States) Kermit Zarley	100,000	20,000	
1966	(Argentina) Roberto De Vicenzo	276	−8	1 stroke	(United States) Joe Campbell (United States) Raymond Floyd (South Africa) Harold Henning	85,000	15,000	
1965: No tournament
1964	(United States) Charles Coody	271	−13	1 stroke	(United States) Jerry Edwards	40,000	5,800	
1963: No tournament
1962	(United States) Billy Maxwell	277	−3	4 strokes	(United States) Johnny Pott	35,000	5,300	
1961	(United States) Earl Stewart	278	−6	1 stroke	(United States) Gay Brewer (United States) Arnold Palmer (United States) Doug Sanders	30,000	4,300	
1960	(United States) Johnny Pott	275	−5	Playoff	(United States) Ted Kroll (United States) Bo Wininger	25,000	3,500	
1959	(United States) Julius Boros	274	−10	1 stroke	(United States) Dow Finsterwald (United States) Earl Stewart (United States) Bo Wininger	25,000	3,500	
1958	(United States) Sam Snead (3)	272	−8	Playoff	(United States) Julius Boros (United States) John McMullin (South Africa) Gary Player	25,000	3,500	
1957	(United States) Sam Snead (2)	264	−20	10 strokes	(United States) Bob Inman (United States) Billy Maxwell (United States) Cary Middlecoff	40,000	8,000	
Texas International Open
1956 (Jun)	(Australia) Peter Thomson	267	−13	Playoff	(United States) Gene Littler (United States) Cary Middlecoff	70,000	13,478	
Dallas Centennial Open
1956 (May)	(United States) Don January	268	−12	1 stroke	(United States) Dow Finsterwald (United States) Doug Ford	30,000	6,000	
1947-1955: No tournament
Dallas Invitational
1946	(United States) Ben Hogan	284	+4	2 strokes	(United States) Herman Keiser (United States) Paul Runyan	10,000	2,000	
Dallas Open
1945	(United States) Sam Snead	276	−12	4 strokes	(United States) Jug McSpaden	10,000	2,000	
Texas Victory Open
1944	(United States) Byron Nelson	276	−8	10 strokes	(United States) Jug McSpaden	10,000	2,000	

Note: Green highlight indicates scoring records.

== Multiple winners ==
Seven players have won this tournament more than once through 2023.

- 4 wins
  - Tom Watson: 1975, 1978, 1979, 1980
- 3 wins
  - Sam Snead: 1945, 1957, 1958
- 2 wins
  - Jack Nicklaus: 1970, 1971
  - Bruce Lietzke: 1981, 1988
  - Sergio García: 2004, 2016
  - Lee Kyoung-hoon: 2021, 2022
  - Jason Day: 2010, 2023

== See also ==
- Dallas Open (1926)
