= Spring 1981 PGA Tour Qualifying School graduates =

This is a list of Spring 1981 PGA Tour Qualifying School graduates.

| # | Player | Notes |
|---|---|---|
| 1 | (United States) Billy Glisson | |
| T2 | (United States) Charles Krenkel | |
| | (South Africa) Gavan Levenson | 1 European Tour win |
| T4 | (Zimbabwe) Denis Watson | |
| | (United States) Clarence Rose | Winner of 1979 North Carolina Amateur |
| | (United States) Tom Woodward | |
| 7 | (United States) Barry Harwell | |
| T8 | (United States) Charlie Gibson | |
| | (United States) Jeff Thomsen | |
| | (United States) Skeeter Heath | |
| T11 | (United States) Tom Chain | |
| | (United States) Payne Stewart | Winner of 2 Asia Golf Circuit events |
| | (United States) Bob Proben | |
| | (United States) Terry Anton | |
| | (Japan) Tateo Ozaki | |
| | (United States) Bill Loeffler | |
| T17 | (United States) Mark Calcavecchia | |
| | (United States) Don Reese | |
| | (United States) Rick Borg | |
| | (United States) Jim Bertoncino | |
| | (United States) Tom Inskeep | |
| | (United States) Larry Rinker | Winner of 1978 Southeastern Conference Championship |
| T23 | (United States) Gene George | |
| | (United States) Jeff Sanders | |
| | (United States) David Sann | |
