= Chattanooga Classic (PGA Tour) =

Golf tournament formerly on the PGA Tour

Tournament information
- Location: Chattanooga, Tennessee
- Established: 1983
- Courses: Valleybrook GCC; Council Fire GCC
- Par: 72
- Length: 6,999 yards (6,400 m)
- Tour: PGA Tour
- Format: Stroke play
- Prize fund: US$800,000
- Month played: July
- Final year: 1992

Tournament record score
- Aggregate: 260 Peter Persons (1990); 260 Dillard Pruitt (1991)
- To par: −20 as above

Final champion
- (United States) Mark Carnevale
- Location in the United States Location in Tennessee

The Chattanooga Classic was a golf tournament on the PGA Tour from 1986 to 1992. It was played at Valleybrook Golf and Country Club in Hixson, Tennessee from 1983 to 1991 and at the Council Fire Golf and Country Club in Chattanooga, Tennessee.

It was founded in 1983 as the Michelob-Chattanooga Gold Cup Classic and from 1983 to 1985, it was part of the PGA Tour's "Tournament Players Series", a "satellite tour". In 1986, it was played opposite the U.S. Open and although the prize money counted as official the win did not. From 1987 to 1990, it was played opposite the NEC World Series of Golf and from 1991 to 1992 it was played opposite The Open Championship.

The purse for the 1992 tournament was $800,000 with $144,000 going to the winner.

== Winners ==
Year	Tour (Note: PGAT − PGA Tour; TPS − Tournament Players Series.)	Winner	Score	To par	Margin of victory	Runner(s)-up	Ref.
Chattanooga Classic
1992	PGAT	(United States) Mark Carnevale	269	−19	2 strokes	(United States) Ed Dougherty (United States) Dan Forsman	
1991	PGAT	(United States) Dillard Pruitt	260	−20	2 strokes	(United States) Lance Ten Broeck	
1990	PGAT	(United States) Peter Persons	260	−20	2 strokes	(Canada) Richard Zokol	
1989	PGAT	(United States) Stan Utley	263	−17	3 strokes	(Canada) Ray Stewart	
Provident Classic
1988	PGAT	(United States) Phil Blackmar	264	−16	Playoff	(United States) Payne Stewart	
1987	PGAT	(United States) John Inman	265	−15	1 stroke	(United States) Bill Glasson (United States) Rocco Mediate	
1986		(United States) Brad Faxon	261	−19	1 stroke	(United States) Scott Hoch	
1985	TPS	(United States) Billy Pierot	200	−10	Playoff	(United States) Joe Hager (United States) John McComish	
1984	TPS	(United States) David Canipe	200	−10	Playoff	(United States) Bill Bergin	
Michelob-Chattanooga Gold Cup Classic
1983	TPS	(United States) Jim Dent	272	−12	1 stroke	(United States) Lance Ten Broeck	
