= Tom Byrum =

American professional golfer (born 1960)

Personal information
- Full name: Thomas Elliott Byrum
- Nationality: United States
- Born: September 28, 1960 (age 66) Onida, South Dakota, U.S.
- Height: 5 ft 10 in (1.78 m)
- Weight: 175 lb (79 kg; 12.5 st)

Career
- Sport: Golf
- College: University of New Mexico; New Mexico State University
- Turned professional: 1984
- Current tour: PGA Tour Champions
- Former tours: PGA Tour; Nationwide Tour
- Professional wins: 1
- Highest ranking: 86 (February 1, 1998)

Number of wins by tour
- PGA Tour: 1

Best results in major championships
- Masters Tournament: CUT: 1990, 2003
- PGA Championship: 9th: 1997
- U.S. Open: T8: 2002
- The Open Championship: T43: 2003

Thomas Elliott Byrum (born September 28, 1960) is an American professional golfer who currently plays on the PGA Tour Champions.

== Early life and amateur career ==
Byrum was born in Onida, South Dakota. His brother was Curt, a future PGA Tour pro.

Byrum attended the University of New Mexico and New Mexico State University.

== Professional career ==
In 1984, he turned pro. He has played over five hundred events on the PGA Tour, with his sole victory coming at the 1989 Kemper Open.

Byrum owns two top-10 finishes in major championships: T8 in the 2002 U.S. Open at Bethpage Black and a 9th in the 1997 PGA Championship at Winged Foot Golf Club.

== Professional wins (1) ==
=== PGA Tour wins (1) ===
No.	Date	Tournament	Winning score	Margin of victory	Runners-up
1	Jun 4, 1989	Kemper Open	−16 (66-69-65-68=268)	5 strokes	(United States) Tommy Armour III, (United States) Billy Ray Brown, (United States) Jim Thorpe

PGA Tour playoff record (0–2)

No.	Year	Tournament	Opponent(s)	Result
1	1994	GTE Byron Nelson Golf Classic	(United States) Mark Carnevale, (United States) David Edwards, (United States) Neal Lancaster, (Japan) Yoshi Mizumaki, (United States) David Ogrin	Lancaster won with birdie on first extra hole
2	1999	Michelob Championship at Kingsmill	(United States) Notah Begay III	Lost to par on second extra hole

== Playoff record ==
PGA Tour Champions playoff record (0–1)

No.	Year	Tournament	Opponent	Result
1	2016	Dominion Charity Classic	(United States) Scott McCarron	Lost to birdie on first extra hole

== Results in major championships ==
Tournament	1986	1987	1988	1989
Masters Tournament				
U.S. Open	CUT			
The Open Championship				
PGA Championship		T47	CUT	CUT

Tournament	1990	1991	1992	1993	1994	1995	1996	1997	1998	1999
Masters Tournament	CUT									
U.S. Open	T33	CUT								
The Open Championship										
PGA Championship								9	T62	

Tournament	2000	2001	2002	2003	2004	2005	2006	2007
Masters Tournament				CUT				
U.S. Open		T44	T8	T15	CUT			CUT
The Open Championship				T43		CUT		
PGA Championship					T24			

Top 10
Did not play

CUT = missed the half-way cut
"T" = tied

=== Summary ===
Tournament	Wins	2nd	3rd	Top-5	Top-10	Top-25	Events	Cuts made
Masters Tournament	0	0	0	0	0	0	2	0
U.S. Open	0	0	0	0	1	2	8	4
The Open Championship	0	0	0	0	0	0	2	1
PGA Championship	0	0	0	0	1	2	6	4
Totals	0	0	0	0	2	4	18	9

- Most consecutive cuts made – 4 (1997 PGA – 2002 U.S. Open)
- Longest streak of top-10s – 1 (twice)

== Results in The Players Championship ==
Tournament	1987	1988	1989
The Players Championship	CUT	CUT	T67

Tournament	1990	1991	1992	1993	1994	1995	1996	1997	1998	1999
The Players Championship	CUT	CUT							CUT	70

Tournament	2000	2001	2002	2003	2004	2005
The Players Championship	CUT	T55		CUT	T16	T46

Did not play

CUT = missed the half-way cut
"T" = tied

== Results in senior major championships ==
Results not in chronological order before 2022.

Tournament	2011	2012	2013	2014	2015	2016	2017	2018	2019	2020	2021	2022
The Tradition				T43	T41	T35	T13	T16	5	NT	T35	T47
Senior PGA Championship	CUT	CUT	T35	CUT	CUT	T12	T25	T8	CUT	NT	CUT	CUT
U.S. Senior Open		T36		T14	T26	T27	CUT		T24	NT	T13	CUT
Senior Players Championship			T57	T22	T31	T36	T41	T14	T34	T28	T47	T35
Senior British Open Championship	T23					T5				NT		

Top 10
Did not play

"T" indicates a tie for a place
CUT = missed the halfway cut
NT = No tournament due to COVID-19 pandemic

== See also ==
- 1985 PGA Tour Qualifying School graduates
- 1991 PGA Tour Qualifying School graduates
- 1992 PGA Tour Qualifying School graduates
- 1995 PGA Tour Qualifying School graduates
- 1996 PGA Tour Qualifying School graduates
- 2005 PGA Tour Qualifying School graduates
