= Mark Carnevale =

American golfer and radio commentator (1960–2024)

Personal information
- Full name: Mark Kevin Carnevale
- Nationality: United States
- Born: May 21, 1960 Annapolis, Maryland, U.S.
- Died: July 22, 2024 (aged 64)
- Height: 6 ft 2 in (1.88 m)
- Weight: 238 lb (108 kg; 17.0 st)
- Children: 1

Career
- Sport: Golf
- College: James Madison University
- Turned professional: 1983
- Former tours: PGA Tour; Nike Tour; U.S. Golf Tour
- Professional wins: 5

Number of wins by tour
- PGA Tour: 1
- Korn Ferry Tour: 1
- Other: 3

Best results in major championships
- Masters Tournament: CUT: 1993
- PGA Championship: CUT: 1992
- U.S. Open: T25: 1998
- The Open Championship: DNP

Achievements and awards
- PGA Tour Rookie of the Year: 1992

Mark Kevin Carnevale (May 21, 1960 – July 22, 2024) was an American professional golfer and commentator for Sirius XM PGA Tour Radio. He won once on the PGA Tour, also being awarded Rookie of the Year in 1992.

== Early life and amateur career ==
Carnevale was born in Annapolis, Maryland, where his father, Ben, was the head basketball coach at the United States Naval Academy. He attended Lafayette High School in Williamsburg, Virginia, and later was a golfer at James Madison University.

== Professional career ==
In 1983, Carnevale turned professional. In 1992, Carnevale won the PGA Tour's Chattanooga Classic and was the PGA Tour Rookie of the Year. Carnevale also spent time on the second tier tour, where he won the 1997 Nike Inland Empire Open.

In 2003, he became tournament director of the Nationwide Tour's Virginia Beach Open. After turning 50 in May 2010, Carnevale began play in a limited number of events on the Champions Tour.

== Death ==
Carnevale died on July 22, 2024, at the age of 64.

== Awards and honors ==
In 1992, Carnevale earned the PGA Tour's Rookie of the Year award

== Professional wins (5) ==
=== PGA Tour wins (1) ===
No.	Date	Tournament	Winning score	Margin of victory	Runners-up
1	Jul 19, 1992	Chattanooga Classic	−19 (68-71-66-64=269)	2 strokes	(United States) Ed Dougherty, (United States) Dan Forsman

PGA Tour playoff record (0–1)

No.	Year	Tournament	Opponents	Result
1	1994	GTE Byron Nelson Golf Classic	(United States) Tom Byrum, (United States) David Edwards, (United States) Neal Lancaster, (Japan) Yoshi Mizumaki, (United States) David Ogrin	Lancaster won with birdie on first extra hole

=== Nike Tour wins (1) ===
No.	Date	Tournament	Winning score	Margin of victory	Runner-up
1	Feb 23, 1997	Nike Inland Empire Open	−14 (67-71-70-66=274)	2 strokes	(United States) David Jackson

=== U.S. Golf Tour wins (1) ===
No.	Date	Tournament	Winning score	Margin of victory	Runner-up
1	Jun 4, 1989	Odell Williamson Open	−12 (69-68-71-68=276)	3 strokes	(United States) John O'Neill

=== Other wins (2) ===
- 1984 Virginia Open
- 1990 Utah Open

== Results in major championships ==
Tournament	1992	1993	1994	1995	1996	1997	1998
Masters Tournament		CUT					
U.S. Open			T33				T25
PGA Championship	CUT						

Note: Carnevale never played in The Open Championship.

Did not play

CUT = missed the half-way cut
"T" = tied

== See also ==
- 1991 PGA Tour Qualifying School graduates
- 1997 Nike Tour graduates
