= Peter Persons =

American golfer

Personal information
- Full name: Peter Taylor Persons
- Nationality: United States
- Born: September 8, 1962 (age 64) Macon, Georgia, U.S.
- Height: 5 ft 7 in (1.70 m)
- Weight: 155 lb (70 kg; 11.1 st)

Career
- Sport: Golf
- College: University of Georgia
- Turned professional: 1986
- Former tour: PGA Tour
- Professional wins: 1

Number of wins by tour
- PGA Tour: 1

Best results in major championships
- Masters Tournament: CUT: 1986
- PGA Championship: CUT: 1991
- U.S. Open: T19: 1991
- The Open Championship: DNP

Peter Taylor Persons (born September 8, 1962) is an American professional golfer who has played on the PGA Tour and the Nationwide Tour.

== Early life and amateur career ==
Persons was born and raised in Macon, Georgia. He received coaching and training in the junior program developed by Georgia Golf Hall of Fame member Dan Nyimicz at Idle Hour Golf Club in Macon. Persons won the 1980 Georgia Junior Championship and was the runner-up to Sam Randolph at the 1985 U.S. Amateur. He was the 1984–1985 Georgia Golf Association Men's Player of the Year. He attended the University of Georgia and was a member of the golf team.

== Professional career ==
In 1986, Persons turned professional. He played in a limited number of PGA Tour events in the 1980s. He played full-time on the elite Tour from 1990–1993; and on the Nike Tour from 1994–1996. His best year in professional golf was 1990; he had a win at the Chattanooga Classic, a T-6 at the Hawaiian Open, and finished 66th on the final money list that year. At the 1990 Chattanooga Classic, he finished at 20-under-par 260 to defeat Richard Zokol by two strokes. The tournament was held the same week as the NEC World Series of Golf where most of the Tour's top-tier players elected to compete.

== Amateur wins ==
- 1980 Georgia Junior Championship
- 1984 Georgia Amateur
- 1985 SEC Championship (individual)

== Professional wins (1) ==
=== PGA Tour wins (1) ===
No.	Date	Tournament	Winning score	Margin of victory	Runner-up
1	Aug 26, 1990	Chattanooga Classic	−20 (64-64-65-67=260)	2 strokes	(Canada) Richard Zokol

== Results in major championships ==
Tournament	1986	1987	1988	1989	1990	1991
Masters Tournament	CUT					
U.S. Open						T19
PGA Championship						CUT

Note: Persons never played in The Open Championship.

Did not play

CUT = missed the half-way cut
"T" = tied

== See also ==
- 1989 PGA Tour Qualifying School graduates
