= Dillard Pruitt =

American amateur golfer (born 1961)

Personal information
- Full name: Dillard Pruitt
- Nationality: United States
- Born: September 24, 1961 (age 65) Greenville, South Carolina, U.S.
- Height: 5 ft 11 in (1.80 m)

Career
- Sport: Golf
- College: Clemson University
- Status: Amateur (reinstated 2001); Professional (1985–2001)
- Former tours: PGA Tour; European Tour
- Professional wins: 2

Number of wins by tour
- PGA Tour: 1
- Other: 1

Best results in major championships
- Masters Tournament: T13: 1992
- PGA Championship: T33: 1992
- U.S. Open: T44: 1992
- The Open Championship: DNP

Dillard Pruitt (born September 24, 1961) is an American amateur golfer, who formerly played professionally on the PGA Tour.

== Early life and amateur career ==
Pruitt was born and raised in Greenville, South Carolina. He attended Clemson University from 1981–1984 and was a distinguished member of the golf team. His leadership was a key part of the Tigers rise to prominence in golf in the 1980s. Pruitt was a two-time All-American (first team his senior year), three-time All-ACC and a key member of Clemson's 1982 ACC Championship team.

== Professional career ==
In 1985, Pruitt turned professional. He played on the European Tour in 1986 and 1987 and joined the PGA Tour in 1988.

Pruitt played on the PGA Tour from 1988 to 1996. His highest finish on the money list was 63rd in 1991, when he won $271,861 and the Chattanooga Classic, his only PGA Tour victory. Pruitt was the first Clemson alum to win a PGA Tour event. His best finish in a major championship was tied for 13th at the 1992 Masters. Since retiring as a touring professional, Pruitt has worked for the PGA Tour as a rules official.

== Reinstated amateur status ==
Pruitt's amateur status was reinstated by the United States Golf Association (USGA) in 2001. He went on to win the 2002 Sunnehanna Amateur and the 2002 Canadian Amateur Championship. This led to a firestorm of controversy within the golfing world. The USGA was heavily criticized for allowing a former PGA tournament champion to regain his amateur status.

== Personal life ==
Pruitt is the brother-in-law of golfer Jay Haas, who is married to his sister Jan.

== Amateur wins ==
- 1982 South Carolina Amateur
- 1983 Sunnehanna Amateur
- 2002 Sunnehanna Amateur, Canadian Amateur

== Professional wins (2) ==
=== PGA Tour wins (1) ===
| No. | Date | Tournament | Winning score | Margin of victory | Runner-up |
|---|---|---|---|---|---|
| 1 | Jul 21, 1991 | Chattanooga Classic | −20 (66-65-65-64=260) | 2 strokes | (United States) Lance Ten Broeck |

=== Other wins (1) ===
- 1996 Jerry Ford Invitational

== Results in major championships ==
| Tournament | 1989 | 1990 | 1991 | 1992 | 1993 | 1994 | 1995 |
|---|---|---|---|---|---|---|---|
| Masters Tournament | | | | T13 | CUT | | |
| U.S. Open | T67 | | | T44 | | | |
| PGA Championship | | | T66 | T33 | | | 66 |

Note: Pruitt never played in The Open Championship.

Did not play

CUT = Missed the half-way cut
"T" = Tied

== See also ==
- 1987 PGA Tour Qualifying School graduates
- 1989 PGA Tour Qualifying School graduates
- 1990 PGA Tour Qualifying School graduates
