= Neal Lancaster =

American professional golfer (born 1962)

Personal information
- Full name: Grady Neal Lancaster
- Nationality: United States
- Born: September 13, 1962 (age 64) Smithfield, North Carolina, U.S.
- Height: 6 ft 0 in (1.83 m)
- Weight: 170 lb (77 kg; 12 st)

Career
- Sport: Golf
- Turned professional: 1985
- Current tour: PGA Tour Champions
- Former tours: PGA Tour; Nationwide Tour; U.S. Golf Tour
- Professional wins: 6

Number of wins by tour
- PGA Tour: 1
- Other: 5

Best results in major championships
- Masters Tournament: CUT: 1995, 1996
- PGA Championship: T34: 2002
- U.S. Open: T4: 1995
- The Open Championship: T37: 2002

Grady Neal Lancaster (born September 13, 1962) is an American professional golfer who has played on the PGA Tour, Nationwide Tour and the PGA Tour Champions.

== Career ==
Lancaster was born, raised and makes his home in Smithfield, North Carolina.

In 1985, Lancaster turned pro. He is a completely self-taught player. Lancaster started playing on mini-tours four months in 1989, winning twice on the U.S. Golf Tour, before going to Q School. He did not take his first golf lesson until 1992. His first golf lesson was given by L.B. Floyd, father of Raymond Floyd.

Lancaster has 28 top-10 finishes in 579 PGA Tour events, including a win at the 1994 GTE Byron Nelson Golf Classic, which was shortened to 36 holes due to weather. (Prior to 1996, PGA Tour events shortened to 36 holes were considered official.) His best finish in a major is a T-4 at the 1995 U.S. Open.

Lancaster set the 9-hole record at the U.S. Open with 29 strokes at the 1995 (4th round) and 1996 U.S. Opens (second round). This has been tied by Vijay Singh (2003, second round), Louis Oosthuizen (2015, fourth round), and Tom Kim (2023, third round).

In 2002, Lancaster came to the final hole of the Bell Canadian Open with a two-shot lead. He made double bogey to drop into a sudden death playoff with John Rollins and Justin Leonard. Rollins won on the first extra hole. Lancaster played full-time on the PGA Tour from 1990 to 2005.

Lancaster placed fifth at the 2009 Q School tournament, but shoulder surgeries plagued him for years. He played in the 2012 Farmers Insurance Open, his first PGA Tour start since 2009. He made the cut at the FedEx St. Jude Classic, his first since the 2009 Buick Open.

=== Senior career ===
After turning 50, Lancaster played his first Champions Tour event in October 2012 at the SAS Championship and finished T8 at the tour's Q school. After ending his career as a touring professional, Lancaster became a PGA professional, competing in events sanctioned through the Carolinas section of the PGA. In 2017, Lancaster won Carolinas PGA Senior Professional Championship.

== Professional wins (6) ==
=== PGA Tour wins (1) ===
No.	Date	Tournament	Winning score	Margin of victory	Runners-up
1	May 15, 1994	GTE Byron Nelson Golf Classic	−9 (67-65=132) (Note: Shortened to 36 holes due to weather.)	Playoff	(United States) Tom Byrum, (United States) Mark Carnevale, (United States) David Edwards, (Japan) Yoshi Mizumaki, (United States) David Ogrin

PGA Tour playoff record (1–1)

No.	Year	Tournament	Opponents	Result
1	1994	GTE Byron Nelson Golf Classic	(United States) Tom Byrum, (United States) Mark Carnevale, (United States) David Edwards, (Japan) Yoshi Mizumaki, (United States) David Ogrin	Won with birdie on first extra hole
2	2002	Bell Canadian Open	(United States) Justin Leonard, (United States) John Rollins	Rollins won with birdie on first extra hole

=== U.S. Golf Tour wins (2) ===
- 1989 Pine Tree Open, Oak Forest Summer Golf Classic

=== Other wins (3) ===
- 1985 Carolinas Open
- 1989 Utah Open
- 2017 Carolinas PGA Senior Professional Championship

== Results in major championships ==
Tournament	1992	1993	1994	1995	1996	1997	1998	1999	2000	2001	2002	2003
Masters Tournament				CUT	CUT							
U.S. Open				T4	T82							CUT
The Open Championship											T37	
PGA Championship	T84		T44		T52		CUT				T34	

Top 10
Did not play

CUT = missed the half-way cut
"T" indicates a tie for a place

== See also ==
- 1989 PGA Tour Qualifying School graduates
- 1990 PGA Tour Qualifying School graduates
- 1999 PGA Tour Qualifying School graduates
- 2009 PGA Tour Qualifying School graduates
