= Dave Rummells =

American professional golfer (born 1958)

Personal information
- Nationality: United States
- Born: January 26, 1958 (age 68) Cedar Rapids, Iowa, U.S.
- Height: 6 ft 0 in (1.83 m)
- Weight: 165 lb (75 kg; 11.8 st)

Career
- Sport: Golf
- College: University of Iowa
- Turned professional: 1981
- Current tour: Champions Tour
- Former tours: PGA Tour; Web.com Tour
- Professional wins: 2

Number of wins by tour
- Korn Ferry Tour: 2

Best results in major championships
- Masters Tournament: T31: 1989
- PGA Championship: 5th: 1989
- U.S. Open: T31: 1991
- The Open Championship: DNP

Dave Rummells (born January 26, 1958) is an American professional golfer.

== Early life and amateur career ==
Rummells was born in Cedar Rapids, Iowa, and was raised in West Branch. He played college golf at the University of Iowa.

== Professional career ==
Rummells turned professional in 1981. Rummells played on the PGA Tour from 1986 to 1994, and his best finish was second at the Buick Invitational of California in 1993. He twice finished in the top-10 in a major, both at the PGA Championship: fifth in 1989 and tied for sixth in 1988.

Rummells alternated between the PGA Tour and its developmental tour from 1995 to 2007. He won two events on its developmental tour: the 1996 Nike South Carolina Classic and the 1997 Nike Knoxville Open. After turning 50 in 2008, he played on the Champions Tour and his best finish was in his first event: T-20 at the Regions Charity Classic in 2008.

== Professional wins (2) ==
=== Nike Tour wins (2) ===
No.	Date	Tournament	Winning score	Margin of victory	Runners-up
1	Apr 14, 1996	Nike South Carolina Classic	−12 (69-70-69-68=276)	2 strokes	(United States) P. H. Horgan III, (United States) Brad Ott, (United States) Scott Petersen
2	Jun 8, 1997	Nike Knoxville Open	−17 (65-70-70-66=271)	2 strokes	(United States) Matt Gogel, (Australia) Terry Price

== Results in major championships ==
Tournament	1986	1987	1988	1989	1990	1991	1992	1993	1994
Masters Tournament				T31	CUT				
U.S. Open	CUT	77	WD		T47	T31			T60
PGA Championship			T6	5	T31	CUT		CUT	

Note: Rummells never played in The Open Championship.

Top 10
Did not play

CUT = missed the half way cut
WD = withdrew
"T" indicates a tie for a place

== See also ==
- 1985 PGA Tour Qualifying School graduates
- 1990 PGA Tour Qualifying School graduates
- 1992 PGA Tour Qualifying School graduates
- 1996 Nike Tour graduates
