= Payne Stewart =

American professional golfer (1957–1999)

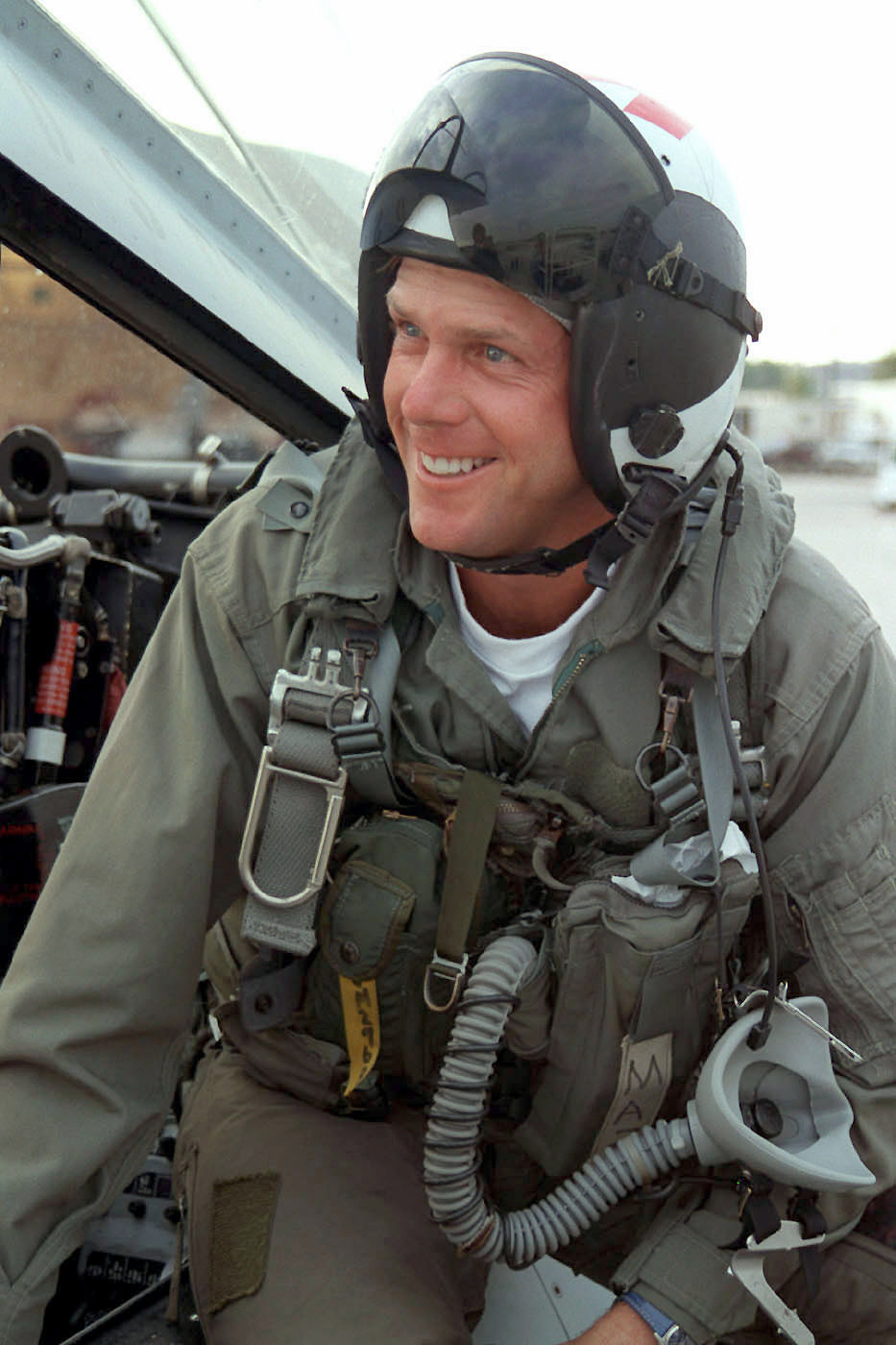
- Stewart in 1998

Personal information
- Full name: William Payne Stewart
- Nationality: United States
- Born: January 30, 1957 Springfield, Missouri, U.S.
- Died: October 25, 1999 (aged 42) over Mina, South Dakota, U.S.
- Spouse: Tracey Ferguson (m. 1982)
- Children: 2

Career
- Sport: Golf
- College: Southern Methodist University
- Turned professional: 1979
- Former tours: PGA Tour; Asia Golf Circuit
- Professional wins: 24
- Highest ranking: 3 (June 10, 1990)

Number of wins by tour
- PGA Tour: 11
- European Tour: 4
- Japan Golf Tour: 1
- PGA Tour of Australasia: 1
- Other: 10

Best results in major championships (wins: 3)
- Masters Tournament: T8: 1986
- PGA Championship: Won: 1989
- U.S. Open: Won: 1991, 1999
- The Open Championship: 2nd/T2: 1985, 1990

Achievements and awards
- World Golf Hall of Fame: 2001 (member page)
- Byron Nelson Award: 1989
- Bob Jones Award: 2014

William Payne Stewart (January 30, 1957 – October 25, 1999) was an American professional golfer who won 11 PGA Tour events, including three major championships, the last of which came just a few months before his death in an airplane accident at the age of 42.

Stewart gained his first major title at the 1989 PGA Championship. He won the 1991 U.S. Open after a playoff against Scott Simpson. At the 1999 U.S. Open at Pinehurst, Stewart captured his third major title after holing a 15-foot (5 m) par putt on the final hole for a one-stroke victory over Phil Mickelson.

Stewart wore distinctive clothing. He was reputed to have the biggest wardrobe of all professional golfers, often photographed in attire of ivy caps and patterned pants, which were a cross between plus fours and knickerbockers, a throwback to the once-commonplace golf "uniform". Stewart was also known for his fluid and stylish golf swing.

== Early life ==
Stewart was born and raised in Springfield, Missouri. He attended Greenwood Laboratory School, a K–12 school on the campus of Missouri State University.

Stewart played collegiate golf at Southern Methodist University in University Park, Texas. His coach was Earl Stewart. Stewart was also a member of Phi Gamma Delta. In 1979, he graduated.

== Professional career ==
In 1979, Stewart turned professional. He failed to earn a PGA Tour card at qualifying school after his senior year of college. Stewart played on the Asia Golf Circuit for a couple of seasons. He won two tournaments in 1981, including the Indonesia Open in a playoff over three players. Later that year, Stewart earned his PGA Tour card at Spring 1981 PGA Tour Qualifying School. He won his first title on the tour at the 1982 Quad Cities Open. This win was especially memorable to him because it was the only time his father, Bill, saw him win. Stewart's father had played in the 1955 U.S. Open, and had introduced his son to the game.

In 1983, Stewart gained his second PGA Tour victory by winning the Walt Disney World Golf Classic by two strokes. At the 1985 Byron Nelson Golf Classic, Stewart came to the 72nd hole with a three-shot lead. Moments after Bob Eastwood birdied the final hole of regulation, Stewart took a double bogey to end the tournament tied for first. Stewart then made another double bogey on the first playoff hole, causing him to lose to Eastwood.

In 1985, Stewart came close to winning The Open Championship, when he finished one stroke behind the champion Sandy Lyle.

Stewart briefly led the U.S. Open in 1986 during the back nine of the final round at Shinnecock Hills. After birdieing the 11th and 12th, Stewart took a one-shot lead, but he then had bogeys at the 13th and 14th, finishing the tournament tied for sixth place, behind the winner Raymond Floyd.

Stewart had four runner-up finishes on the PGA Tour in 1986. Despite not winning a tournament that year, he had the most top-10 finishes of any player on the PGA Tour, finishing inside the top-10 sixteen times.

Another runner-up finish came in early 1987 at the AT&T at Pebble Beach, after leading by two shots after 54 holes. Six weeks later, Stewart won the Hertz Bay Hill Classic in Orlando, Florida, shooting a third round of 63 and a final round of 65 to beat South African David Frost by three shots. It was a two-man duel in the final round, as Frost finished eight shots ahead of the third-place finisher Dan Pohl. Stewart's victory was a memorable one to him as it came on his home course. His house was situated adjacent to the 12th tee of the Bay Hill Club course in Orlando, Florida. Stewart's cumulative tournament score of 264 is, to date, still a record for the lowest aggregate score over 72 holes in the event, which later became known as the "Arnold Palmer Invitational" held at the same Bay Hill venue. Stewart donated his $108,000 winner's share to a Florida hospital in memory of his father, who died of cancer in 1985.

Stewart had two runner-up finishes on the PGA Tour in 1988, at The Honda Classic and the Provident Classic.

In April 1989, Stewart won the MCI Heritage Golf Classic by five strokes, with a then tournament-record score of 268, 16-under-par. His victory at the Heritage Classic was his 18th top-10 finish on the PGA Tour since his previous win at the Bay Hill Classic in March 1987. Stewart was gaining a reputation for being one of the most consistent players on the PGA Tour and one of the best players in the world not yet to have won a major championship at that point.

At Kemper Lakes Golf Club, Stewart won the PGA Championship in 1989, his first major title. At the start of the final round, Stewart was six shots behind the leader Mike Reid. He made up five strokes in the final three holes to overtake Reid and win by a stroke. Stewart's back-nine of 31 included birdies on four of his last five holes. He was able to gain the lead over Reid, who bogeyed the 16th, double-bogeyed the 17th, and missed a seven-foot (2 m) birdie putt on the 18th, which would have forced a playoff. After the tournament, Stewart said: "This is a dream I've been trying to realize for a long time." Reid shed tears and said: "As disappointed as I am, I'm happy for Payne."

The following year, Stewart became the first player to win back-to-back titles at the MCI Heritage Golf Classic at Harbour Town Golf Links, winning a playoff against Larry Mize and Steve Jones on the second extra hole with an 18-foot (5 m) birdie putt. This was his first playoff win on the PGA Tour, having lost all five of his playoffs in the 1980s. In May 1990, Stewart won his second tournament of the year at the GTE Byron Nelson Golf Classic. As a result of this victory and runner-up finishes at the Western Open and 1990 Open Championship Stewart reached his Official World Golf Ranking (OWGR) peak of number 3 in the summer of 1990. At the end of 1990, Stewart was ranked as the fifth-best golfer in the world on the OWGR. Overall, Stewart spent nearly 250 weeks within the top 10 of the OWGR between 1986, the year the OWGR began, and 1999, the year of his death.

Stewart's second major title came at the 1991 U.S. Open after an 18-hole Monday playoff with Scott Simpson on a windblown Hazeltine National Golf Club course in Minnesota. Stewart was two shots behind Simpson going into the final three holes of the playoff. After the 16th hole, the match was squared, as Stewart holed a 20-foot (6 m) birdie putt and Simpson missed a 3-foot (1 m) par putt. Stewart's par on the 18th hole won the playoff by two strokes.

The following month, Stewart won the 1991 Heineken Dutch Open by nine shots, which included a course record of 62 in the third round. Stewart won the Hassan II Golf Trophy in Morocco in 1992 and 1993.

In 1993 at Royal St George's Golf Club in England, Stewart's fourth round of 63 tied the record for the lowest individual round in The Open Championship. He was one of 10 players, until Branden Grace shot a 62 in 2017, to hold the record for shooting a 63 at the British Open. In 1995, Stewart gained his first U.S. PGA Tour win in four years by winning the Shell Houston Open in a playoff over Scott Hoch, who lost a six-shot lead with seven holes to play. Hoch collapsed on the back-nine with three bogeys and a double-bogey on the 17th when his tee shot found water. Stewart won the playoff on the first extra hole.

In the 1998 U.S. Open at Olympic Club in San Francisco, Stewart had a four-shot lead going into the final round, but lost to Lee Janzen by a stroke. Stewart missed a 25-foot birdie putt on the 18th hole of his final round, which would have forced a playoff with Janzen.

The following year at the 1999 U.S. Open at Pinehurst Resort, Stewart won his last major title, memorably holing a 15-foot par putt that defeated Phil Mickelson by a stroke in the final round when Tiger Woods and Vijay Singh were also in contention for the trophy. Stewart credited his winning putt to being more at peace with himself after his strengthened religious belief. A statue of Stewart celebrates his winning putt behind the 18th green of the No. 2 course at Pinehurst Resort.

At the time of his death, Stewart was ranked third on the all-time money list and in the top 10 of the Official World Golf Ranking – he had been ranked in the top 10 for almost 250 weeks from 1986 to 1993, and again in 1999. At a time of international domination of the golf scene in the late 1980s and early 1990s, he was often the highest-ranked American player. At the time of his death, Stewart had won $12,673,193 in career earnings. He won over $2 million during the 1999 season and finished seventh on the year's money list.

Stewart represented the United States on five Ryder Cup teams (1987, 1989, 1991, 1993, and 1999). He also played for the U.S. on three World Cup teams. His Ryder cup record was 8–9–2. Stewart was known for his patriotic passion for the Ryder Cup, once saying of his European opponents, "On paper, they should be caddying for us." The United States team was 3–1–1 during the five times he played. He was disappointed to miss out in 1995 and 1997 when he failed to qualify automatically and was not chosen as a captain's pick. In the 1999 Ryder Cup, Stewart criticized the heckling of European player Colin Montgomerie. With victory assured for the United States, Stewart conceded a putt (and his own singles match) to Montgomerie on the 18th hole. "This game is about sportsmanship," Stewart said afterward.

Stewart was a golfing traditionalist, who once said: "In the United States, all we do is play the ball in the air." He gained an affection for links golf, becoming a popular figure in Ireland after playing on Irish courses to warm up for The Open Championship. After he died in 1999, Waterville Golf Links in County Kerry, Ireland, commissioned a bronze statue of Stewart to pay tribute to him and his affiliation with Waterville. Stewart historically played well in The Open Championship, finishing runner-up in 1985 and 1990. In general, he was known to play well internationally, posting victories at the 1981 Indian Open, the 1981 Indonesia Open, and Japan Golf Tour's 1985 Jun Classic. He also played in international tournaments that were less obscure for American golfers, posting runners-up at the 1982 Australian Open, 1989 German Masters, and the 1993 Scottish Open. He also won the 1991 Dutch Open.

For a large part of his career, Stewart was known for his National Football League (NFL) sponsorship, whereby he wore the team colors of the geographically closest NFL franchise; the sponsorship ended in May 1995.

== Personal life ==
In 1980, Stewart met Tracey Ferguson, sister of Australian golfer Mike Ferguson, in Kuala Lumpur, Malaysia while he was playing the Malaysian Open. They were married by November 1982.

Stewart was also a musician, and played harmonica in the blues rock group Jake Trout and the Flounders, which also included fellow golfers Mark Lye and Peter Jacobsen. The band released one album, I Love to Play in 1998. The music video for the title track, a golf-themed parody of Randy Newman's "I Love L.A.", earned rotation on VH-1.

== Death and legacy ==
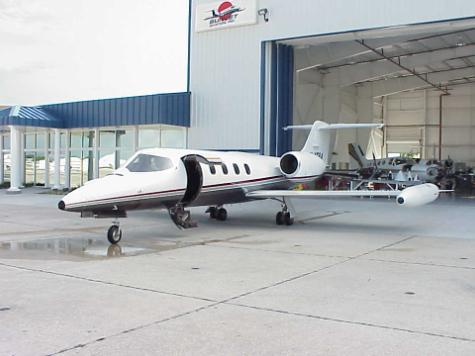
The aircraft Stewart was flying on

On October 25, 1999, Stewart was killed in the crash of a Learjet flying from his home in Orlando, Florida, to Texas for the year-ending tournament, The Tour Championship, held at Champions Golf Club in Houston. National Transportation Safety Board (NTSB) investigators concluded that the aircraft failed to pressurize and that all on board were incapacitated by hypoxia as the aircraft passed to the west of Gainesville, Florida. The aircraft continued flying on autopilot until it ran out of fuel and crashed into a field near Mina, South Dakota.

=== Legacy ===
I didn't sleep at all. I tossed and turned all night, and I don't see how you couldn't. Anyone who knew Payne...it's a huge blow to all of us because he was a part of our lives. To have him gone, it's really difficult to refer to him right now in the past tense. That's the hardest thing for me right now when I talk about it...I just saw him the other day. It's hard to believe he's not going to be here.

— Tiger Woods reacting to Stewart's death at the Champions Golf Club the day after the plane crash

At that week's tournament, The Tour Championship, Stewart's good friend, Stuart Appleby, organized a tribute to his friend. With Stewart's wife's permission, he wore one of Payne's own signature outfits for the final round of the tournament on Sunday, and most of the rest of the golfers in the field wore "short pants" that day, as well.

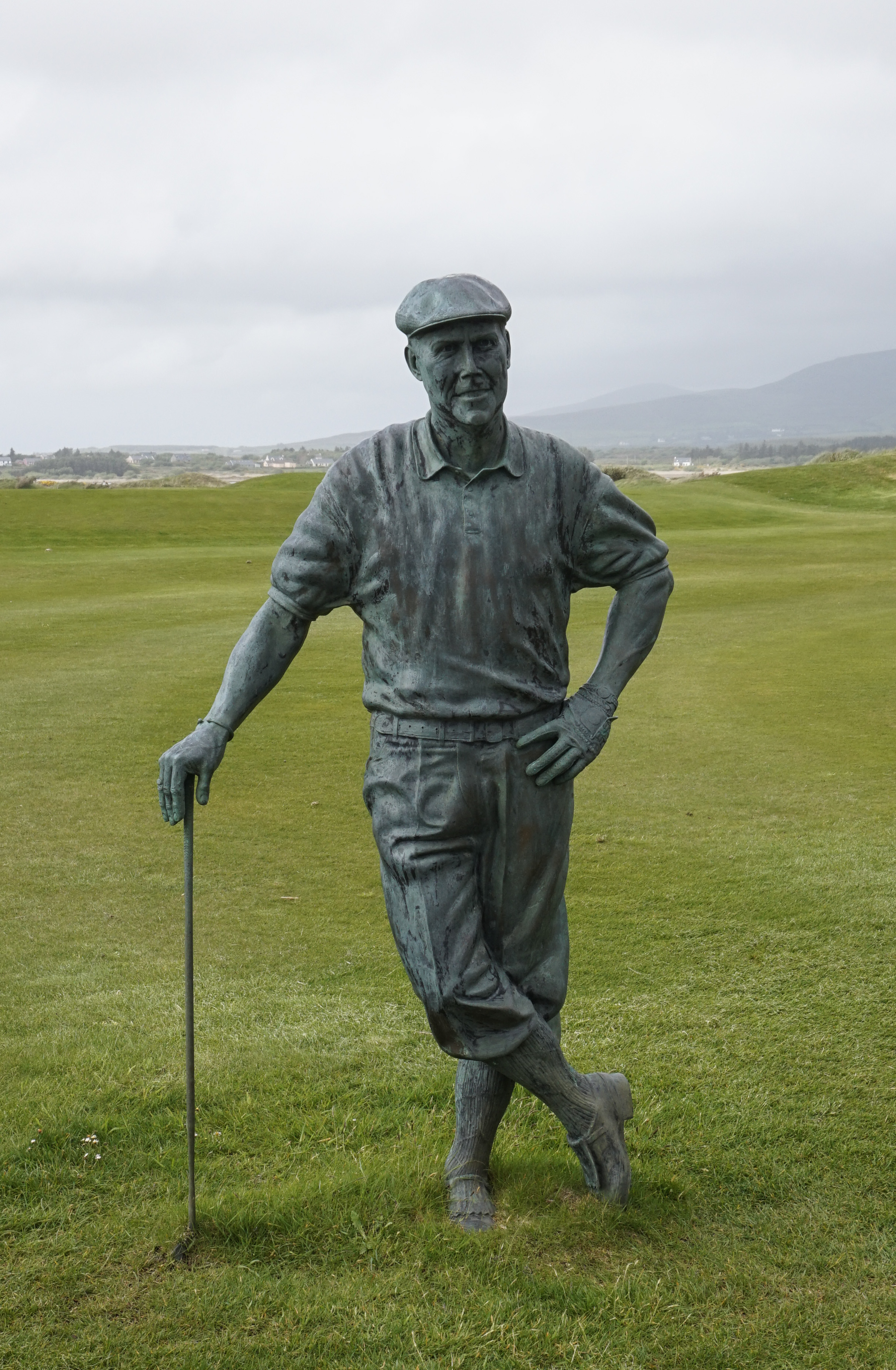
Statue of Payne Stewart at Waterville Golf Links, Ireland

The tournament had been delayed in order to allow those who would be competing in it to attend Stewart's memorial service at the First Baptist Church of Orlando on October 30. Speakers included Tracey Stewart and Paul Azinger, both a fellow professional and one of Stewart's close friends, while attendees included Woods, Mickelson, Jack Nicklaus, Greg Norman, Davis Love III, Hal Sutton, Justin Leonard and Fred Couples, along with MLB pitcher Orel Hershiser, another friend of Stewart's.

One year after Stewart's death, his widow Tracey and their two children, and the family of Stewart's agent, Robert Fraley, who also died on that flight, brought a lawsuit against Learjet, flight operator SunJet Aviation, Inc., and aircraft owner JetShares One Inc. They alleged that a cracked adapter resulted in an airflow valve detaching from the frame, causing a fatal loss of cabin pressure. They also claimed that the aircraft was severely out of maintenance because of SunJet's negligence. In April 2000 as part of a federal criminal investigation, the Federal Bureau of Investigation raided SunJet and seized its flight logbooks, effectively grounding all of its aircraft. The investigation was dropped in 2002, but it was too late to save SunJet; unable to legally operate, it had filed for bankruptcy protection in June 2000. The case against Learjet went forward in state court in Orlando. In June 2005, jurors found that the aircraft's manufacturer had no liability in the deaths of Stewart and Fraley and that no negligence was found in the design or manufacture of the aircraft.

The segment of Interstate 44 passing through Springfield, Missouri, was designated the "Payne Stewart Memorial Highway" in his memory. Payne Stewart Drive in Fullerton, California, and Payne Stewart Drive in Surrey, British Columbia, Canada, leading into Northview golf course designed by Arnold Palmer, were named after him. Finally, Payne Stewart Drive in Jacksonville, Florida, houses The First Tee along with a Job Corps center.

The communities of Mina and Aberdeen created their own memorial. Jon Hoffman, the owner of the property where the aircraft crashed, contacted Stewart's widow and several family members of other crash victims. All agreed that the memorial would be a rock from the crash site, engraved with the victims' names and a Bible passage. Hoffman fenced in about an acre (4,000 m^{2}) of the property surrounding the memorial.

In 2000, the PGA Tour established the Payne Stewart Award, given each year to a player who shows respect for the traditions of the game, commitment to uphold the game's heritage of charitable support and professional and meticulous presentation of himself and the sport through his dress and conduct. At Pinehurst No. 2, a bronze statue of Stewart celebrating his winning putt in the 1999 U.S. Open there overlooks the 18th green. On the first day of the 2014 U.S. Open, the second time that Pinehurst No. 2 had hosted the tournament since 1999, Rickie Fowler wore plus fours and argyle socks in tribute to Stewart.

Also, at the 2000 U.S. Open at Pebble Beach, where Stewart would have been the defending champion, further tributes were paid. Firstly, on the eve of the tournament, there was another memorial at the 18th hole where speakers again included Tracey Stewart and Azinger. This time, the attendees included Stewart's old caddy Mike Hicks plus other professionals due to compete in the tournament such as Mickelson, Love, David Duval, Tom Lehman, Lee Janzen and Sergio García, and it concluded with shots being hit into Stillwater Cove in a golf version of a 21-gun salute. The next day, when Stewart's defending champion spot in the traditional initial pairings alongside the Open Championship winner (Paul Lawrie) and U.S. Amateur winner (David Gossett) was given to Nicklaus playing in his 44th consecutive and final U.S. Open, Nicklaus asked for a moment of silence before his opening tee shot. García also wore Stewart's trademark navy plus fours in his honor during his first round.

In tribute to Stewart, as well as his southwestern Missouri roots, the Payne Stewart Golf Club was opened in Branson, Missouri, in June 2009 with the approval of Stewart's widow. Ground-breaking on the $31 million layout took place on July 24, 2006. The 7,319-yard, 18-hole course was designed by Bobby Clampett and Chuck Smith. Each hole on the course is named for some aspect or notable moment in Stewart's life. The fifth hole, for example, named "Road Hole", recounts the par Stewart made in the first round of the 1990 Open Championship at Old Course at St Andrews when he was forced to knock his third shot against the wall behind the green at the Old Course's treacherous 17th. His ball finished just on the back fringe from where he chipped in. Later in 2020, Woods christened the first public course by him and his company TGR Design at Big Cedar Lodge near Branson as Payne's Valley in Stewart's honor.

On the 10th anniversary of Stewart's death in 2009, Golf Channel presented a special program to remember his life. It included recorded interviews with family, friends, and archived videos of his golf career.

The following is a list of courses for the design of which Stewart was at least in part responsible.

- OD denotes courses for which Stewart is the original designer
- R denotes courses reconstructed by Stewart
- A denotes courses for which Stewart made substantial additions
- E denotes courses that Stewart examined and on the construction of which he consulted

Name	Contribution	Year built	City / Town	State / Province	Country	Comments
Coyote Hills GC	E	1996	Fullerton	California	United States	designed by Cal Olson, a bronze statue of Stewart stands outside of the clubhouse.

== In popular culture ==
- Stewart appeared on an episode of the American television sitcom Home Improvement titled "Futile Attraction", which aired on March 10, 1998, and featured Stewart as himself.
- Canadian actor Bryan Malcolm portrayed Payne Stewart in the Canadian TV series Mayday Season 16: Episode 1 (2016) called "Deadly Silence" and Air Crash Investigation Special Report Season 2: Episode 9 (2019) called "Radio Silence".

== Professional wins (24) ==
=== PGA Tour wins (11) ===
Legend
Major championships (3)
Other PGA Tour (8)

No.	Date	Tournament	Winning score	To par	Margin of victory	Runner(s)-up
1	Jul 18, 1982	Miller High Life QCO	66-71-68-63=268	−12	2 strokes	(United States) Brad Bryant, (United States) Pat McGowan
2	Oct 23, 1983	Walt Disney World Golf Classic	69-64-69-67=269	−19	2 strokes	(England) Nick Faldo, (United States) Mark McCumber
3	Mar 15, 1987	Hertz Bay Hill Classic	69-67-63-65=264	−20	3 strokes	(South Africa) David Frost
4	Apr 16, 1989	MCI Heritage Golf Classic	65-67-67-69=268	−16	5 strokes	(United States) Kenny Perry
5	Aug 13, 1989	PGA Championship	74-66-69-67=276	−12	1 stroke	(United States) Andy Bean, (United States) Mike Reid, (United States) Curtis Strange
6	Apr 15, 1990	MCI Heritage Golf Classic (2)	70-69-66-71=276	−8	Playoff	(United States) Steve Jones, (United States) Larry Mize
7	May 6, 1990	GTE Byron Nelson Golf Classic	67-68-67=202 (Note: Shortened to 54 holes due to weather.)	−8	2 strokes	(United States) Lanny Wadkins
8	Jun 17, 1991	U.S. Open	67-70-73-72=282	−6	Playoff	(United States) Scott Simpson
9	Apr 30, 1995	Shell Houston Open	73-65-70-68=276	−12	Playoff	(United States) Scott Hoch
10	Feb 7, 1999	AT&T Pebble Beach National Pro-Am	69-64-73=206	−10	1 stroke	(United States) Frank Lickliter
11	Jun 20, 1999	U.S. Open (2)	68-69-72-70=279	−1	1 stroke	(United States) Phil Mickelson

PGA Tour playoff record (3–6)

No.	Year	Tournament	Opponent(s)	Result
1	1984	Colonial National Invitation	(United States) Peter Jacobsen	Lost to birdie on first extra hole
2	1985	Byron Nelson Golf Classic	(United States) Bob Eastwood	Lost to bogey on first extra hole
3	1986	Colonial National Invitation	(United States) Dan Pohl	Lost to birdie on first extra hole
4	1988	Provident Classic	(United States) Phil Blackmar	Lost to birdie on first extra hole
5	1989	Nabisco Championship	(United States) Tom Kite	Lost to par on second extra hole
6	1990	MCI Heritage Golf Classic	(United States) Steve Jones, (United States) Larry Mize	Won with birdie on second extra hole Jones eliminated by par on first hole
7	1991	U.S. Open	(United States) Scott Simpson	Won 18-hole playoff; Stewart: +3 (75), Simpson: +5 (77)
8	1995	Shell Houston Open	(United States) Scott Hoch	Won with par on first extra hole
9	1999	MCI Classic	(United States) Glen Day, (United States) Jeff Sluman	Day won with birdie on first extra hole

=== European Tour wins (4) ===
Legend
Major championships (3)
Other European Tour (1)

No.	Date	Tournament	Winning score	To par	Margin of victory	Runner(s)-up
1	Aug 13, 1989	PGA Championship	74-66-69-67=276	−12	1 stroke	(United States) Andy Bean, (United States) Mike Reid, (United States) Curtis Strange
2	Jun 17, 1991	U.S. Open	67-70-73-72=282	−6	Playoff	(United States) Scott Simpson
3	Jul 28, 1991	Heineken Dutch Open	67-68-62-70=267	−21	9 strokes	(Sweden) Per-Ulrik Johansson, (Germany) Bernhard Langer
4	Jun 20, 1999	U.S. Open (2)	68-69-72-70=279	−1	1 stroke	(United States) Phil Mickelson

European Tour playoff record (1–0)

No.	Year	Tournament	Opponent	Result
1	1991	U.S. Open	(United States) Scott Simpson	Won 18-hole playoff; Stewart: +3 (75), Simpson: +5 (77)

=== PGA of Japan Tour wins (1) ===
No.	Date	Tournament	Winning score	To par	Margin of victory	Runners-up
1	Sep 29, 1985	Gene Sarazen Jun Classic	69-70-70=209	−7	Shared title with (Japan) Kazushige Kono and (Japan) Masahiro Kuramoto	

=== Asia Golf Circuit wins (2) ===
No.	Date	Tournament	Winning score	To par	Margin of victory	Runners-up
1	Mar 15, 1981	Indian Open	67-67-77-73=284	−4	4 strokes	(Taiwan) Ho Ming-chung, (Taiwan) Hsu Sheng-san
2	Apr 5, 1981	Indonesia Open	74-69-70-70=283	−5	Playoff	(Taiwan) Chen Tze-chung, (Taiwan) Hsu Chi-san, (Thailand) Sukree Onsham

Asia Golf Circuit playoff record (1–0)

No.	Year	Tournament	Opponents	Result
1	1981	Indonesia Open	(Taiwan) Chen Tze-chung, (Taiwan) Hsu Chi-san, (Thailand) Sukree Onsham	Won with birdie on first extra hole

=== PGA Tour of Australia wins (1) ===
No.	Date	Tournament	Winning score	To par	Margin of victory	Runner-up
1	Nov 14, 1982	Resch's Pilsner Tweed Classic	71-65-71-72=279	−9	2 strokes	(Myanmar) Kyi Hla Han

=== Other wins (8) ===
No.	Date	Tournament	Winning score	To par	Margin of victory	Runner(s)-up
1	Apr 11, 1982	Magnolia Classic	65-67-71-67=270	−10	3 strokes	(United States) Jay Cudd, (United States) Bruce Douglass
2	Aug 18, 1987	Fred Meyer Challenge (with (Japan) Isao Aoki)	66-61=127	−17	2 strokes	(United States) Peter Jacobsen and (United States) Curtis Strange
3	Nov 24, 1990	World Cup Individual Trophy	69-68-68-66=271	−17	2 strokes	(Denmark) Anders Sørensen
4	Dec 1, 1991	Skins Game	$260,000		$100,000	(United States) John Daly
5	Nov 8, 1992	Hassan II Golf Trophy	67-70-72-72=281	−11	Playoff	(United States) D. A. Weibring
6	Nov 29, 1992	Skins Game (2)	$220,000		$10,000	(United States) Fred Couples
7	Nov 14, 1993	Hassan II Golf Trophy (2)	69-70-71-67=277	−15	8 strokes	(United States) Brian Claar, (United States) Dillard Pruitt, (South Africa) Wayne Westner
8	Nov 28, 1993	Skins Game (3)	$280,000		$20,000	(United States) Fred Couples

Other playoff record (1–2)

No.	Year	Tournament	Opponent(s)	Result
1	1991	Hassan II Golf Trophy	(Fiji) Vijay Singh	Lost to birdie on first extra hole
2	1992	Hassan II Golf Trophy	(United States) D. A. Weibring	Won with birdie on second extra hole
3	1995	Fred Meyer Challenge (with (United States) Paul Azinger)	(United States) Brad Faxon and (Australia) Greg Norman	Lost to birdie on first extra hole

== Major championships ==
=== Wins (3) ===
Year	Championship	54 holes	Winning score	Margin	Runner(s)-up
1989	PGA Championship	6 shot deficit	−12 (74-66-69-67=276)	1 stroke	(United States) Andy Bean, (United States) Mike Reid, (United States) Curtis Strange
1991	U.S. Open	Tied for lead	−6 (67-70-73-72=282)	Playoff^{1}	(United States) Scott Simpson
1999	U.S. Open (2)	1 shot lead	−1 (68-69-72-70=279)	1 stroke	(United States) Phil Mickelson

^{1}Defeated Simpson in an 18-hole playoff – Stewart 75 (+3), Simpson 77 (+5).

=== Results timeline ===
Tournament	1981	1982	1983	1984	1985	1986	1987	1988	1989
Masters Tournament			T32	T21	T25	T8	T42	T25	T24
U.S. Open				CUT	T5	T6	CUT	T10	T13
The Open Championship	T58			CUT	2	T35	T4	T7	T8
PGA Championship		CUT	CUT	CUT	T12	T5	T24	T9	1

Tournament	1990	1991	1992	1993	1994	1995	1996	1997	1998	1999
Masters Tournament	T36		CUT	T9	CUT	T41	CUT			T52
U.S. Open	CUT	1	T51	2	CUT	T21	T27	T28	2	1
The Open Championship	T2	T32	T34	12	CUT	T11	T45	59	T44	T30
PGA Championship	T8	T13	T69	T44	T66	T13	T69	T29	CUT	T57

Win
Top 10
Did not play

CUT = missed the half-way cut (3rd round cut in 1984 Open Championship)
"T" = tied

=== Summary ===
Tournament	Wins	2nd	3rd	Top-5	Top-10	Top-25	Events	Cuts made
Masters Tournament	0	0	0	0	2	6	14	11
U.S. Open	2	2	0	5	7	9	16	12
The Open Championship	0	2	0	3	5	7	17	15
PGA Championship	1	0	0	2	4	8	18	14
Totals	3	4	0	10	18	30	65	52

- Most consecutive cuts made – 11 (1987 Open Championship – 1990 Masters)
- Longest streak of top-10s – 3 (twice)

== Results in The Players Championship ==
Tournament	1983	1984	1985	1986	1987	1988	1989	1990	1991	1992	1993	1994	1995	1996	1997	1998	1999
The Players Championship	CUT	T64	T13	T10	CUT	T8	CUT	T11		T13	T11	CUT	T3	T41	CUT	T8	T23

Top 10
Did not play

CUT = missed the halfway cut
"T" indicates a tie for a place

== Results in World Golf Championships ==
Tournament	1999
Match Play	R64
Championship	
Invitational	T15

Did not play

QF, R16, R32, R64 = Round in which player lost in match play
"T" = Tied

== U.S. national team appearances ==
Professional

- Four Tours World Championship: 1986, 1987 (winners), 1989 (winners), 1990
- Ryder Cup: 1987, 1989 (tied), 1991 (winners), 1993 (winners), 1999 (winners)
- World Cup: 1987, 1990
- Alfred Dunhill Cup: 1993, 1999
- Wendy's 3-Tour Challenge (representing PGA Tour): 1996 (winners)

== See also ==
- Spring 1981 PGA Tour Qualifying School graduates
