= Larry Rinker =

American professional golfer

Personal information
- Nationality: United States
- Born: July 20, 1957 (age 69) Stuart, Florida, U.S.
- Height: 5 ft 9 in (1.75 m)
- Weight: 155 lb (70 kg; 11.1 st)

Career
- Sport: Golf
- College: University of Florida
- Turned professional: 1979
- Former tours: PGA Tour; Nationwide Tour
- Professional wins: 7

Best results in major championships
- Masters Tournament: CUT: 1983, 1986
- PGA Championship: T59: 1984
- U.S. Open: T15: 1982
- The Open Championship: T12: 1992

Achievements and awards
- Golfweek Mini-Tour player of the year: 1980

Larry Rinker (born July 20, 1957) is an American professional golfer.

== Career ==
Rinker was born in Stuart, Florida. He played college golf at the University of Florida.

Rinker turned professional in 1979. He initially played on mini-tours before joining the PGA Tour in 1981, and regained his tour card via qualifying school for 1982, the first year of the all-exempt tour. His best year came in 1985, when he finished 30th on the money list. He never won on tour but recorded two runners-up finishes at the 1984 USF&G Classic and the 1985 Bing Crosby National Pro-Am. His best finish in a major was tied-12th at the 1992 Open Championship. He also finished T-15 at the 1982 U.S. Open. In the third round, he played in the final group with leader Bruce Devlin.

Since leaving the Tour, Rinker is now teaching full-time in Florida and has written three books, "Rinker's 5 Fundamentals," "The Upper Core Swing" and "The Journeyman." He was the host of a golf instruction show, "Rinker's Golf Tips," on SiriusXM PGA Tour Radio 2013-2020.

== Personal life ==
Rinker's brother, Lee Rinker, and his sister, Laurie Rinker, are also professional golfers. In 1985, he and Laurie teamed together to win the JCPenney Classic.

== Amateur wins ==
- 1978 Southeastern Conference Championship

== Professional wins ==
- 1980 6 mini-tour wins
- 1985 JCPenney Classic (with Laurie Rinker)

== Results in major championships ==
Tournament	1978	1979
Masters Tournament		
U.S. Open		
The Open Championship		
PGA Championship	CUT	

Tournament	1980	1981	1982	1983	1984	1985	1986	1987	1988	1989
Masters Tournament				CUT			CUT			
U.S. Open	CUT		T15	CUT			T24			
The Open Championship										CUT
PGA Championship					T59	CUT	CUT			

Tournament	1990	1991	1992	1993	1994	1995	1996	1997
Masters Tournament								
U.S. Open	CUT	T53						CUT
The Open Championship			T12	CUT				
PGA Championship								

Did not play

CUT = missed the half-way cut
"T" = tied

== See also ==
- Spring 1981 PGA Tour Qualifying School graduates
- 1982 PGA Tour Qualifying School graduates
- 1983 PGA Tour Qualifying School graduates
- 1996 PGA Tour Qualifying School graduates
