= Lance Ten Broeck =

American professional golfer (1956–2023)

Personal information
- Nationality: United States
- Born: March 21, 1956 Chicago, Illinois, U.S.
- Died: April 30, 2023 (aged 67) West Palm Beach, Florida, U.S.
- Height: 6 ft 3 in (1.91 m)
- Weight: 195 lb (88 kg; 13.9 st)

Career
- Sport: Golf
- College: University of Texas
- Turned professional: 1977
- Former tours: PGA Tour; Nationwide Tour; PGA Tour Champions
- Professional wins: 2

Best results in major championships
- Masters Tournament: DNP
- PGA Championship: DNP
- U.S. Open: T31: 1991
- The Open Championship: DNP

Lance Ten Broeck (March 21, 1956 – April 30, 2023) was an American professional golfer who played on the PGA Tour, Nationwide Tour, and Champions Tour.

== Early life and amateur career ==
Ten Broeck was born in Chicago, Illinois, and grew up in Beverly, a community on the city's southwest side. He attended the University of Texas, and was a member of the golf team from 1975 to 1976. He was a two-time All-American and winner of the Massingill trophy in 1975.

== Professional career ==
In 1977, Ten Broeck turned pro. He played in 349 PGA Tour events in his career making the cut 159 times including ten top-10 finishes. His best finish in an official PGA Tour event was a stand-alone 2nd at the 1991 Chattanooga Classic. His best finish in a major was a T-31 at the 1991 U.S. Open. He won the 1984 Magnolia State Classic before that tournament became an official PGA Tour event.

After his playing days were over, Ten Broeck began work as a caddie. His clients included several big name players – notably Robert Allenby and Jesper Parnevik. Since Ten Broeck made more than 150 cuts in his career on the PGA Tour, he was a veteran member of the tour, near the bottom of the list in eligibility. He frequently committed to playing in events in which he was scheduled to caddie, just in case the unlikely happened and more players drop out than there are alternates at the course. In 2008, he returned to the PGA Tour for the first time since 1998 in the Legends Reno-Tahoe Open, a tournament played opposite the WGC-Bridgestone Invitational. In May 2009, he caddied and played in the Valero Texas Open, missing the cut but beating Jesper Parnevik who, he caddied for. He attempted to repeat the feat in February 2010 at the Mayakoba Golf Classic at Riviera Maya-Cancun. He caddied for Richard S. Johnson in the morning then played in the afternoon (replacing Notah Begay III). After shooting 5-over-par, he withdrew from playing the second round. Ten Broeck earned more in his best season working as a caddie ($235,000) than in his best season as a player ($146,568 in 1989).

In 2008, Ten Broeck played in his first Champions Tour event at the 3M Championship. His best finish in a Champions Tour event was a T-9 in the 2012 U.S. Senior Open.

== Personal life and death ==
Ten Broeck lived on Singer Island in Palm Beach County, Florida. He died on April 30, 2023, at a hospital in West Palm Beach, Florida, at the age of 67.

== Professional wins (2) ==
=== Tournament Players Series wins (1) ===
- 1984 Magnolia State Classic

=== Other wins (1) ===
- 1984 Illinois Open Championship

== Results in major championships ==
Tournament	1975	1976	1977	1978	1979	1980	1981	1982	1983	1984	1985	1986	1987	1988	1989	1990	1991	1992
U.S. Open	T49					T54			CUT	CUT	CUT						T31	CUT

Note: The only major Ten Broeck played was the U.S. Open.

Did not play

CUT = missed the half-way cut
"T" = tied

== See also ==
- Fall 1979 PGA Tour Qualifying School graduates
- Fall 1981 PGA Tour Qualifying School graduates
- 1987 PGA Tour Qualifying School graduates
- 1988 PGA Tour Qualifying School graduates
