= 1998 Players Championship =

Tournament information
- Dates: March 26–29, 1998
- Location: Ponte Vedra Beach, Florida; 30.198°N 81.394°W
- Courses: TPC Sawgrass, Stadium Course
- Tour: PGA Tour

Statistics
- Par: 72
- Length: 6,950 yards (6,355 m)
- Field: 144 players, 72 after cut
- Cut: 146 (+2)
- Prize fund: $4.0 million
- Winner's share: $720,000

Champion
- (United States) Justin Leonard
- 278 (−10)

Location map
- Location in the United States Location in Florida

The 1998 Players Championship was a golf tournament in Florida on the PGA Tour, held March 26–29 at TPC Sawgrass in Ponte Vedra Beach, southeast of Jacksonville. It was the 25th Players Championship.

== Tournament summary ==
Defending champion Steve Elkington withdrew on Monday night, citing complications after sinus surgery. He was the first defending champion that did not compete since Jerry Pate in 1983. In addition, Greg Norman, the 1994 champion, withdrew prior to the first round with a shoulder injury.

Lee Janzen, who won the tournament three years previous, held the lead after third round. However, he shot a final round 79 and fell to eighteenth. Journeyman Len Mattiace took advantage, surging into the lead. However, he scored a quintuple-bogey at the par-3 17th hole to end his chances. He birdied the final hole though to finish in the top five. Five strokes back, Justin Leonard shot a final round 67 to win at 278 (−10), two ahead of runners-up Glen Day and Tom Lehman.

== Venue ==
This was the seventeenth Players Championship held at the TPC at Sawgrass Stadium Course; it was extended this year to 6,950 yards (6,355 m), an increase of 54 yards (49 m).

== Field ==
1. All winners of PGA Tour events awarding official money and official victory status in the preceding 12 months, concluding with the Bay Hill Invitational and dating from the 1997 Players Championship

- Phil Blackmar
- Michael Bradley
- Mark Calcavecchia
- Stewart Cink
- Fred Couples
- David Duval
- Ernie Els
- Brad Faxon
- David Frost
- Tim Herron
- Gabriel Hjertstedt
- Scott Hoch
- John Huston
- Steve Jones
- Justin Leonard
- Davis Love III
- Billy Mayfair
- Scott McCarron
- Phil Mickelson
- Frank Nobilo
- Jesper Parnevik
- Nick Price
- Billy Ray Brown
- Loren Roberts
- Scott Simpson
- Vijay Singh
- David Toms
- Tiger Woods

2. The top 125 PGA Tour players from the final 1997 Official Money List

- John Adams
- Fulton Allem
- Billy Andrade
- Stuart Appleby
- Paul Azinger
- Doug Barron
- Ronnie Black
- Guy Boros
- Mike Brisky
- Mark Brooks
- Olin Browne
- Tom Byrum
- Jim Carter
- Brandel Chamblee
- Michael Christie
- Darren Clarke
- Lennie Clements
- Russ Cochran
- John Cook
- Robert Damron
- Glen Day
- Jay Don Blake
- Joe Durant
- David Edwards
- Bob Estes
- Brad Fabel
- Nick Faldo
- Rick Fehr
- Dan Forsman
- Fred Funk
- Jim Furyk
- Robert Gamez
- Brent Geiberger
- Kelly Gibson
- Paul Goydos
- Scott Gump
- Jay Haas
- Donnie Hammond
- Dudley Hart
- Nolan Henke
- Brian Henninger
- P. H. Horgan III
- Mike Hulbert
- Lee Janzen
- Pete Jordan
- Jerry Kelly
- Skip Kendall
- Tom Kite
- Neal Lancaster
- Tom Lehman
- Frank Lickliter
- Steve Lowery
- Andrew Magee
- Jeff Maggert
- Doug Martin
- Len Mattiace
- Rocco Mediate
- Larry Mize
- Colin Montgomerie
- Larry Nelson
- David Ogrin
- Mark O'Meara
- Joe Ozaki
- Craig Parry
- Steve Pate
- Chris Perry
- Kenny Perry
- Don Pooley
- Mike Reid
- Lee Rinker
- Larry Rinker
- Clarence Rose
- Joey Sindelar
- Jeff Sluman
- Mike Springer
- Craig Stadler
- Mike Standly
- Paul Stankowski
- Payne Stewart
- David Sutherland
- Kevin Sutherland
- Hal Sutton
- Phil Tataurangi
- Tommy Tolles
- Kirk Triplett
- Ted Tryba
- Bob Tway
- Omar Uresti
- Grant Waite
- Duffy Waldorf
- Tom Watson
- Mark Wiebe
- Willie Wood

3. Winners in the last 10 calendar years of The Players Championship, Masters Tournament, U.S. Open, PGA Championship, and NEC World Series of Golf

- Ben Crenshaw
- John Daly
- Wayne Grady
- Bernhard Langer
- Sandy Lyle
- José María Olazábal
- Mark McCumber
- Corey Pavin
- Tom Purtzer
- Curtis Strange
- Ian Woosnam

4. British Open winners since 1990

5. Up to eight players, not otherwise eligible, designated by The Players Championship Committee as "special selections"

- Retief Goosen
- Per-Ulrik Johansson
- Shigeki Maruyama
- Masashi Ozaki
- Costantino Rocca
- Lee Westwood

6. Any players, not otherwise eligible, who are among the top 10 money winners from the 1998 Official Money List through the Bay Hill Invitational

7. To complete a field of 144 players, those players in order, not otherwise eligible, from the 1998 Official Money List through the Bay Hill Invitational

- Stephen Ames
- Tommy Armour III
- Trevor Dodds
- Bruce Lietzke
- Steve Stricker
- Scott Verplank

== Round summaries ==
=== First round ===
Thursday, March 26, 1998

Place	Player	Score	To par
1	(United States) Glen Day	66	−6
T2	(United States) Fred Couples	67	−5
T2	(United States) Rocco Mediate	67	−5
4	(United States) Jerry Kelly	68	−4
T5	(United States) Mark Calcavecchia	69	−3
T5	(United States) Ben Crenshaw	69	−3
T5	(United States) David Duval	69	−3
T5	(South Africa) David Frost	69	−3
T5	(United States) Nolan Henke	69	−3
T5	(Sweden) Per-Ulrik Johansson	69	−3
T5	(United States) Bruce Lietzke	69	−3
T5	(United States) Jeff Maggert	69	−3
T5	(United States) Len Mattiace	69	−3
T5	(United States) Billy Mayfair	69	−3
T5	(United States) Phil Mickelson	69	−3
T5	(Japan) Naomichi Ozaki	69	−3

=== Second round ===
Friday, March 27, 1998

Place	Player	Score	To par
T1	(United States) Lee Janzen	70-67=137	−7
T1	(Japan) Naomichi Ozaki	69-68=137	−7
2	(United States) Tom Kite	72-66=138	−6
T3	(United States) Glen Day	66-73=139	−5
T3	(United States) Jerry Kelly	68-71=139	−5
T3	(United States) Bruce Lietzke	69-70=139	−5
T6	(United States) Fred Couples	67-73=140	−4
T6	(South Africa) David Frost	69-71=140	−4
T6	(United States) Scott Gump	72-68=140	−4
T6	(United States) Jeff Maggert	69-71=140	−4
T6	(United States) Len Mattiace	69-71=140	−4
T6	(United States) Rocco Mediate	67-73=140	−4

=== Third round ===
Saturday, March 28, 1998

Place	Player	Score	To par
1	(United States) Lee Janzen	70-67-69=206	−10
2	(United States) Glen Day	66-73-70=209	−7
3	(United States) Justin Leonard	72-69-70=211	−5
T4	(United States) Mark Calcavecchia	69-75-68=212	−4
T4	(United States) Scott Hoch	73-69-70=212	−4
T4	(United States) Tom Lehman	72-70-70=212	−4
T4	(United States) Len Mattiace	69-71-72=212	−4
T4	(United States) Phil Mickelson	69-73-70=212	−4
T9	(United States) Fred Couples	67-73-73=213	−3
T9	(South Africa) Ernie Els	71-72-70=213	−3
T9	(South Africa) David Frost	69-71-73=213	−3
T9	(United States) Bruce Lietzke	69-70-74=213	−3
T9	(United States) Billy Mayfair	69-75-69=213	−3
T9	(Japan) Naomichi Ozaki	69-68-76=213	−3
T9	(Zimbabwe) Nick Price	71-72-70=213	−3
T9	(United States) Craig Stadler	71-70-72=213	−3
T9	(United States) Omar Uresti	72-71-70=213	−3
T9	(England) Lee Westwood	74-71-68=213	−3

=== Final round ===
Sunday, March 29, 1998

Champion
(c) = past champion

Place	Player	Score	To par	Money ($)
1	(United States) Justin Leonard	72-69-70-67=278	−10	720,000
T2	(United States) Glen Day	66-73-70-71=280	−8	352,000
T2	(United States) Tom Lehman	72-70-70-68=280	−8	352,000
4	(United States) Mark Calcavecchia	69-75-68-69=281	−7	192,000
T5	(United States) Scott Hoch	73-69-70-70=282	−6	146,000
T5	(United States) Len Mattiace	69-71-72-70=282	−6	146,000
T5	(England) Lee Westwood	74-71-68-69=282	−6	146,000
T8	(United States) Phil Mickelson	69-73-70-71=283	−5	116,000
T8	(Zimbabwe) Nick Price (c)	71-72-70-70=283	−5	116,000
T8	(United States) Payne Stewart	72-71-75-65=283	−5	116,000

Leaderboard below the top 10
Place	Player	Score	To par	Money ($)
T11	(South Africa) Ernie Els	71-72-70-71=284	−4	96,000
T11	(United States) Scott Verplank	71-71-72-70=284	−4	96,000
T13	(United States) John Cook	71-73-71-70=285	−3	77,333
T13	(United States) Lee Janzen (c)	70-67-69-79=285	−3	77,333
T13	(United States) Bruce Lietzke	69-70-74-72=285	−3	77,333
T16	(United States) John Daly	71-70-76-69=286	−2	66,000
T16	(United States) David Sutherland	72-73-69-72=286	−2	66,000
T18	(United States) Doug Barron	71-72-74-70=287	−1	48,685
T18	(United States) David Duval	69-77-70-71=287	−1	48,685
T18	(England) Nick Faldo	75-69-70-73=287	−1	48,685
T18	(Japan) Naomichi Ozaki	69-68-76-74=287	−1	48,685
T18	(United States) Hal Sutton (c)	74-69-74-70=287	−1	48,685
T18	(United States) Bob Tway	72-71-75-69=287	−1	48,685
T18	(United States) Omar Uresti	72-71-70-74=287	−1	48,685
T25	(United States) Dudley Hart	74-70-71-73=288	E	30,533
T25	(United States) Steve Jones	71-71-73-73=288	E	30,533
T25	(United States) Tom Kite (c)	72-66-78-72=288	E	30,533
T25	(Spain) José María Olazábal	72-74-70-72=288	E	30,533
T25	(Sweden) Jesper Parnevik	72-72-72-72=288	E	30,533
T25	(United States) Lee Rinker	72-73-72-71=288	E	30,533
T31	(United States) Tommy Armour III	71-75-71-72=289	+1	24,250
T31	(United States) Jerry Kelly	68-71-77-73=289	+1	24,250
T31	(United States) Larry Mize	73-73-73-70=289	+1	24,250
T31	(United States) Craig Stadler	71-70-72-76=289	+1	24,250
T35	(United States) Billy Andrade	70-74-75-71=290	+2	18,885
T35	(United States) Brad Faxon	71-73-72-74=290	+2	18,885
T35	(United States) Jim Furyk	70-75-73-72=290	+2	18,885
T35	(United States) Scott McCarron	72-72-71-75=290	+2	18,885
T35	(United States) Kirk Triplett	71-71-73-75=290	+2	18,885
T35	(United States) Tom Watson	71-74-71-74=290	+2	18,885
T35	(United States) Tiger Woods	72-73-73-72=290	+2	18,885
T42	(United States) Brandel Chamblee	72-73-76-70=291	+3	12,560
T42	(United States) Stewart Cink	71-73-74-73=291	+3	12,560
T42	(United States) Fred Couples (c)	67-73-73-78=291	+3	12,560
T42	(United States) Bob Estes	72-70-74-75=291	+3	12,560
T42	(South Africa) David Frost	69-71-73-78=291	+3	12,560
T42	(United States) Billy Mayfair	69-75-69-78=291	+3	12,560
T42	(United States) Mark O'Meara	70-75-72-74=291	+3	12,560
T42	(United States) Steve Pate	71-71-74-75=291	+3	12,560
T42	(United States) Kevin Sutherland	72-70-73-76=291	+3	12,560
T51	(United States) Michael Bradley	74-72-76-70=292	+4	9,626
T51	(United States) Jeff Maggert	69-71-76-76=292	+4	9,626
T51	(United States) Steve Stricker	74-72-70-76=292	+4	9,626
T54	(United States) Scott Gump	72-68-76-77=293	+5	9,200
T54	(Sweden) Per-Ulrik Johansson	69-74-78-72=293	+5	9,200
T54	(Fiji) Vijay Singh	72-71-75-75=293	+5	9,200
T57	(United States) Paul Goydos	72-70-80-72=294	+6	8,920
T57	(United States) Nolan Henke	69-73-77-75=294	+6	8,920
T57	(United States) Davis Love III (c)	73-72-69-80=294	+6	8,920
T57	(United States) Rocco Mediate	67-73-77-77=294	+6	8,920
T61	(United States) Joey Sindelar	73-69-81-72=295	+7	8,680
T61	(United States) Ted Tryba	70-74-72-79=295	+7	8,680
T63	(United States) Robert Gamez	74-72-77-73=296	+8	8,480
T63	(New Zealand) Frank Nobilo	72-72-75-77=296	+8	8,480
T63	(New Zealand) Grant Waite	76-70-75-75=296	+8	8,480
T66	(United States) Phil Blackmar	72-74-76-75=297	+9	8,280
T66	(United States) Brian Henninger	73-72-73-79=297	+9	8,280
68	(United States) Skip Kendall	74-72-73-79=298	+10	8,160
T69	(United States) Fred Funk	73-73-75-78=299	+11	8,040
T69	(United States) Donnie Hammond	71-75-72-81=299	+11	8,040
T71	(United States) Larry Rinker	78-67-81-74=300	+12	7,880
T71	(United States) Mark Wiebe	76-69-76-79=300	+12	7,880
CUT	(Australia) Stuart Appleby	72-75=147	+3	
CUT	(United States) Robert Damron	71-76=147	+3	
CUT	(United States) Brad Fabel	75-72=147	+3	
CUT	(United States) Brent Geiberger	74-73=147	+3	
CUT	(United States) John Huston	72-75=147	+3	
CUT	(Japan) Shigeki Maruyama	74-73=147	+3	
CUT	(United States) Larry Nelson	74-73=147	+3	
CUT	(United States) Mike Reid	74-73=147	+3	
CUT	(United States) David Toms	71-76=147	+3	
CUT	(United States) Willie Wood	73-74=147	+3	
CUT	(South Africa) Fulton Allem	74-74=148	+4	
CUT	(United States) Ronnie Black	70-78=148	+4	
CUT	(United States) Mark Brooks	73-75=148	+4	
CUT	(United States) David Edwards	73-75=148	+4	
CUT	(United States) Kelly Gibson	75-73=148	+4	
CUT	(United States) P. H. Horgan III	76-72=148	+4	
CUT	(Scotland) Colin Montgomerie	74-74=148	+4	
CUT	(United States) David Ogrin	74-74=148	+4	
CUT	(United States) Corey Pavin	75-73=148	+4	
CUT	(United States) Chris Perry	72-76=148	+4	
CUT	(United States) Don Pooley	75-73=148	+4	
CUT	(United States) Curtis Strange	78-70=148	+4	
CUT	(South Africa) Retief Goosen	71-78=149	+5	
CUT	(United States) Tim Herron	74-75=149	+5	
CUT	(United States) Neal Lancaster	76-73=149	+5	
CUT	(United States) Frank Lickliter	77-72=149	+5	
CUT	(United States) Steve Lowery	71-78=149	+5	
CUT	(Scotland) Sandy Lyle (c)	74-75=149	+5	
CUT	(United States) Kenny Perry	74-75=149	+5	
CUT	(United States) Loren Roberts	75-74=149	+5	
CUT	(United States) Mike Standly	73-76=149	+5	
CUT	(New Zealand) Phil Tataurangi	75-74=149	+5	
CUT	(United States) Tommy Tolles	77-72=149	+5	
CUT	(United States) John Adams	74-76=150	+6	
CUT	(United States) Ben Crenshaw	69-81=150	+6	
CUT	(United States) Rick Fehr	77-73=150	+6	
CUT	(Sweden) Gabriel Hjertstedt	74-76=150	+6	
CUT	(United States) Doug Martin	74-76=150	+6	
CUT	(United States) Jeff Sluman	74-76=150	+6	
CUT	(United States) Duffy Waldorf	75-75=150	+6	
CUT	(United States) Russ Cochran	72-79=151	+7	
CUT	(United States) Jay Haas	74-77=151	+7	
CUT	(Germany) Bernhard Langer	80-71=151	+7	
CUT	(Australia) Craig Parry	73-78=151	+7	
CUT	(United States) Clarence Rose	76-75=151	+7	
CUT	(United States) Mike Brisky	80-72=152	+8	
CUT	(United States) Olin Browne	78-74=152	+8	
CUT	(Namibia) Trevor Dodds	76-76=152	+8	
CUT	(United States) Mike Hulbert	73-79=152	+8	
CUT	(United States) Pete Jordan	73-79=152	+8	
CUT	(United States) Andrew Magee	71-81=152	+8	
CUT	(Italy) Costantino Rocca	76-76=152	+8	
CUT	(United States) Michael Christie	81-72=153	+9	
CUT	(Northern Ireland) Darren Clarke	74-79=153	+9	
CUT	(United States) Scott Simpson	75-78=153	+9	
CUT	(United States) Tom Byrum	79-75=154	+10	
CUT	(United States) Mark McCumber (c)	77-77=154	+10	
CUT	(Japan) Masashi Ozaki	77-77=154	+10	
CUT	(United States) Tom Purtzer	77-77=154	+10	
CUT	(United States) Guy Boros	75-80=155	+11	
CUT	(Trinidad and Tobago) Stephen Ames	71-85=156	+12	
CUT	(United States) Joe Durant	75-81=156	+12	
CUT	(Australia) Wayne Grady	76-81=157	+13	
CUT	(United States) Billy Ray Brown	81-77=158	+14	
CUT	(United States) Jim Carter	78-81=159	+15	
CUT	(United States) Lennie Clements	78-81=159	+15	
CUT	(United States) Mike Springer	79-81=160	+16	
CUT	(United States) Paul Azinger	80-81=161	+17	
WD	(United States) Paul Stankowski	75	+3	
WD	(United States) Jay Don Blake	78	+6	
WD	(United States) Dan Forsman	78	+6	
WD	(Wales) Ian Woosnam			
