= 2000 Players Championship =

Tournament information
- Dates: March 23–27, 2000
- Location: Ponte Vedra Beach, Florida; 30.198°N 81.394°W
- Courses: TPC Sawgrass, Stadium Course
- Tour: PGA Tour

Statistics
- Par: 72
- Length: 7,093 yards (6,486 m)
- Field: 144 players, 80 after cut
- Cut: 150 (+6)
- Prize fund: $6.0 million
- Winner's share: $1.08 million

Champion
- (United States) Hal Sutton
- 278 (−10)

Location map
- Location in the United States Location in Florida

The 2000 Players Championship was a golf tournament in Florida on the PGA Tour, held March 23–27 at TPC Sawgrass in Ponte Vedra Beach, southeast of Jacksonville. It was the 27th Players Championship.

== Tournament summary ==
Hal Sutton, the champion seventeen years earlier in 1983, led by a stroke after each round and won his second Players, a stroke ahead of runner-up Tiger Woods. Both carded scores of 71 (−1) in the final round, and Sutton hit 17 of 18 greens in regulation. Because of thunderstorms and heavy rain, the final round was completed on Monday, March 27. In the last pairing, Sutton and Woods were on the twelfth hole when play was suspended on Sunday night.

Late in the third round on Saturday, Sutton had gone 25 holes without making a bogey. At the par-3 17th hole, he hit his tee shot in the water and took a triple-bogey six, which trimmed his lead over Woods to just one stroke.

Traditionally the richest event in golf, this was the first Players with a seven-figure winner's share, at $1.08 million. Sutton's win in 1983 was the first Players with a six-figure first prize. Woods won the event the following year.

Defending champion David Duval finished nine strokes back, in a tie for thirteenth place.

== Venue ==
This was the 19th Players Championship held at the TPC at Sawgrass Stadium Course and it remained at 7,093 yards (6,486 m).

== Field ==
1. Winners of PGA Tour co-sponsored or approved tournaments, whose victories are considered official, since the 1999 Players Championship

- Stuart Appleby
- Paul Azinger
- Rich Beem
- Notah Begay III
- Olin Browne
- Jim Carter
- Darren Clarke
- Glen Day
- David Duval
- Brad Faxon
- Carlos Franco
- Jim Furyk
- Brent Geiberger
- Dudley Hart
- Brian Henninger
- Paul Lawrie
- Tom Lehman
- J. L. Lewis
- Phil Mickelson
- José María Olazábal
- Jesper Parnevik
- Tom Pernice Jr.
- Loren Roberts
- Hal Sutton
- David Toms
- Kirk Triplett
- Ted Tryba
- Duffy Waldorf
- Mike Weir
- Tiger Woods

2. Those players among the top 125 finishers on the 1999 Official Money List

- Stephen Ames
- Billy Andrade
- Tommy Armour III
- Woody Austin
- Craig Barlow
- Doug Barron
- Jay Don Blake
- Mike Brisky
- Mark Brooks
- Tom Byrum
- Mark Calcavecchia
- Greg Chalmers
- Brandel Chamblee
- Barry Cheesman
- Stewart Cink
- John Cook
- Fred Couples
- Robert Damron
- Jay Delsing
- Chris DiMarco
- Scott Dunlap
- Ernie Els
- Bob Estes
- Brad Fabel
- Steve Flesch
- Dan Forsman
- Harrison Frazar
- David Frost
- Fred Funk
- Sergio García
- Bill Glasson
- Paul Goydos
- Scott Gump
- Jay Haas
- J. P. Hayes
- Nolan Henke
- Tim Herron
- Gabriel Hjertstedt
- Scott Hoch
- Bradley Hughes
- John Huston
- Lee Janzen
- Steve Jones
- Jonathan Kaye
- Jerry Kelly
- Skip Kendall
- Greg Kraft
- Franklin Langham
- Justin Leonard
- Frank Lickliter
- Davis Love III
- Steve Lowery
- Andrew Magee
- Jeff Maggert
- John Maginnes
- Len Mattiace
- Billy Mayfair
- Scott McCarron
- Rocco Mediate
- Larry Mize
- Colin Montgomerie
- Greg Norman
- Mark O'Meara
- Craig Parry
- Steve Pate
- Dennis Paulson
- Corey Pavin
- Chris Perry
- Kenny Perry
- Nick Price
- Dicky Pride
- Charles Raulerson
- Mike Reid
- Chris Riley
- Rory Sabbatini
- Tom Scherrer
- Joey Sindelar
- Vijay Singh
- Jeff Sluman
- Craig Stadler
- Paul Stankowski
- Steve Stricker
- David Sutherland
- Kevin Sutherland
- Esteban Toledo
- Tommy Tolles
- Bob Tway
- Omar Uresti
- Jean van de Velde
- Scott Verplank
- Brian Watts
- Kevin Wentworth
- Lee Westwood
- Mark Wiebe

3. Winners of the Players Championship, Masters Tournament, U.S. Open, British Open, and PGA Championship in the last 10 years (1990-1999)

- Ben Crenshaw
- John Daly
- Nick Faldo
- Wayne Grady
- Tom Kite
- Bernhard Langer
- Ian Woosnam

4. Winners of the NEC World Series of Golf from 1990-98

- Fulton Allem
- Tom Purtzer

5. Winners of Tour Championship in the last three years, beginning with the 1998 winner

6. Winners of World Golf Championship events in the last three years, beginning with the 1999 winners

7. Any player(s), not otherwise eligible, among the top 50 leaders from the Official World Golf Ranking through the Bay Hill Invitational

- Thomas Bjørn
- Retief Goosen
- Miguel Ángel Jiménez

8. Any players, not otherwise eligible, who are among the top 10 money-winners from the 2000 Official Money List below 10th position through the Bay Hill Invitational, in order of their positions on the money list

9. To complete a field of 144 players, those players, not otherwise eligible, from the 2000 Official Money List below 10th position through the Bay Hill Invitational, in order of their positions on the money list

- Robert Allenby
- Ronnie Black
- Eric Booker
- Russ Cochran
- Trevor Dodds
- Matt Gogel
- Shigeki Maruyama
- Naomichi Ozaki

10. The Players Championship Committee may invite a player(s), not otherwise eligible, who is a current inductee of the World Golf Hall of Fame. (Such player(s) would be added to the field.)

== Round summaries ==
=== First round ===
Thursday, March 23, 2000
Friday, March 24, 2000

Place	Player	Score	To par
1	(United States) Hal Sutton	69	−3
T2	(Australia) Robert Allenby	70	−2
T2	(United States) Brad Fabel	70	−2
T2	(United States) Lee Janzen	70	−2
T2	(Germany) Bernhard Langer	70	−2
T2	(United States) Billy Mayfair	70	−2
T2	(United States) Len Mattiace	70	−2
T2	(Japan) Joe Ozaki	70	−2
T2	(United States) Kenny Perry	70	−2
T10	(United States) Craig Barlow	71	−1
T10	(Australia) Greg Chalmers	71	−1
T10	(United States) Tom Lehman	71	−1
T10	(United States) Justin Leonard	71	−1
T10	(United States) Omar Uresti	71	−1
T10	(United States) Tiger Woods	71	−1

=== Second round ===
Friday, March 24, 2000

Place	Player	Score	To par
1	(United States) Hal Sutton	69-69=138	−6
T2	(United States) Tom Lehman	71-68=139	−5
T2	(United States) Omar Uresti	71-68=139	−5
4	(South Africa) Fulton Allem	75-65=140	−4
T5	(South Africa) Ernie Els	73-69=142	−2
T5	(United States) Len Mattiace	70-72=142	−2
T5	(United States) Tiger Woods	71-71=142	−2
T8	(United States) Scott Dunlap	73-70=143	−1
T8	(United States) Lee Janzen	70-73=143	−1
T10	(Australia) Robert Allenby	70-74=144	E
T10	(Trinidad and Tobago) Stephen Ames	72-72=144	E
T10	(United States) Paul Azinger	75-69=144	E
T10	(United States) Jim Carter	73-71=144	E
T10	(United States) Brad Fabel	70-74=144	E
T10	(United States) Jim Furyk	72-72=144	E
T10	(United States) Billy Mayfair	70-74=144	E
T10	(Scotland) Colin Montgomerie	75-69=144	E
T10	(Zimbabwe) Nick Price	73-71=144	E

=== Third round ===
Saturday, March 25, 2000

Place	Player	Score	To par
1	(United States) Hal Sutton	69-69-69=207	−9
2	(United States) Tiger Woods	71-71-66=208	−8
3	(United States) Tom Lehman	71-68-72=211	−5
4	(United States) Jeff Sluman	75-71-66=212	−4
T5	(United States) Lee Janzen	70-73-70=213	−3
T5	(Australia) Craig Parry	70-74-69=213	−3
T7	(United States) Paul Azinger	75-69-70=214	−2
T7	(United States) Robert Damron	78-70-66=214	−2
T7	(United States) Scott Dunlap	73-70-71=214	−2
T7	(South Africa) Ernie Els	73-69-72=214	−2
T7	(Scotland) Colin Montgomerie	75-69-70=214	−2

=== Final round ===
Sunday, March 26, 2000
Monday, March 27, 2000

Champion
(c) = past champion

Place	Player	Score	To par	Money ($)
1	(United States) Hal Sutton (c)	69-69-69-71=278	−10	1,080,000
2	(United States) Tiger Woods	71-71-66-71=279	−9	648,000
T3	(United States) Robert Damron	78-70-66-70=284	−4	270,600
T3	(United States) Scott Dunlap	73-70-71-70=284	−4	270,600
T3	(United States) Jeff Maggert	77-68-71-68=284	−4	270,600
T3	(Scotland) Colin Montgomerie	75-69-70-70=284	−4	270,600
T3	(Zimbabwe) Nick Price (c)	73-71-73-67=284	−4	270,600
8	(United States) Tom Lehman	71-68-72-74=285	−3	186,000
T9	(Australia) Greg Chalmers	71-75-69-71=286	−2	156,000
T9	(United States) Lee Janzen (c)	70-73-70-73=286	−2	156,000
T9	(United States) Len Mattiace	70-72-73-71=286	−2	156,000
T9	(United States) Mark O'Meara	75-74-70-67=286	−2	156,000

Leaderboard below the top 10
Place	Player	Score	To par	Money ($)
T13	(United States) Jim Carter	73-71-72-71=287	−1	112,500
T13	(United States) David Duval (c)	75-73-70-69=287	−1	112,500
T13	(United States) Fred Funk	74-73-68-72=287	−1	112,500
T13	(United States) Scott Hoch	73-75-68-71=287	−1	112,500
T17	(United States) Paul Azinger	75-69-70-74=288	E	90,000
T17	(United States) Billy Mayfair	70-74-73-71=288	E	90,000
T17	(United States) Jeff Sluman	75-71-66-76=288	E	90,000
T20	(South Africa) Ernie Els	73-69-72-75=289	+1	75,000
T20	(United States) Scott Verplank	75-74-68-72=289	+1	75,000
T22	(Australia) Stuart Appleby	72-77-71-70=290	+2	57,600
T22	(Denmark) Thomas Bjørn	76-73-72-69=290	+2	57,600
T22	(United States) Greg Kraft	77-72-70-71=290	+2	57,600
T22	(United States) Justin Leonard (c)	71-76-69-74=290	+2	57,600
T22	(Australia) Craig Parry	70-74-69-77=290	+2	57,600
T27	(Paraguay) Carlos Franco	73-73-73-72=291	+3	41,700
T27	(United States) Steve Jones	80-70-72-69=291	+3	41,700
T27	(Japan) Naomichi Ozaki	70-77-73-71=291	+3	41,700
T27	(United States) Steve Pate	76-74-68-73=291	+3	41,700
T27	(United States) Kenny Perry	70-77-70-74=291	+3	41,700
T27	(Mexico) Esteban Toledo	75-74-72-70=291	+3	41,700
T33	(United States) Stewart Cink	75-73-69-75=292	+4	32,400
T33	(United States) Fred Couples (c)	77-73-73-69=292	+4	32,400
T33	(United States) Harrison Frazar	77-70-72-73=292	+4	32,400
T33	(United States) Chris Perry	76-70-71-75=292	+4	32,400
T33	(Fiji) Vijay Singh	75-73-74-70=292	+4	32,400
T38	(United States) Brad Fabel	70-74-75-74=293	+5	26,400
T38	(United States) Steve Flesch	79-71-72-71=293	+5	26,400
T38	(United States) David Toms	77-72-72-72=293	+5	26,400
T38	(United States) Omar Uresti	71-68-80-74=293	+5	26,400
T42	(Trinidad and Tobago) Stephen Ames	72-72-75-75=294	+6	20,400
T42	(United States) Scott Gump	72-75-73-74=294	+6	20,400
T42	(United States) J. P. Hayes	73-76-71-74=294	+6	20,400
T42	(United States) Jerry Kelly	79-70-73-72=294	+6	20,400
T42	(Germany) Bernhard Langer	70-76-75-73=294	+6	20,400
T42	(United States) Kirk Triplett	75-72-74-73=294	+6	20,400
T48	(United States) John Daly	77-73-74-71=295	+7	15,264
T48	(United States) Frank Lickliter	75-74-71-75=295	+7	15,264
T48	(United States) Davis Love III (c)	73-75-72-75=295	+7	15,264
T48	(United States) Chris Riley	73-77-75-70=295	+7	15,264
T48	(England) Lee Westwood	77-73-72-73=295	+7	15,264
T53	(Australia) Robert Allenby	73-71-77-75=296	+8	13,890
T53	(England) Nick Faldo	73-76-76-71=296	+8	13,890
T53	(Australia) Greg Norman (c)	75-71-73-77=296	+8	13,890
T53	(United States) David Sutherland	75-74-71-76=296	+8	13,890
T57	(United States) Craig Barlow	71-76-75-75=297	+9	13,380
T57	(United States) Mark Brooks	72-75-71-79=297	+9	13,380
T57	(South Africa) David Frost	78-69-78-72=297	+9	13,380
T57	(United States) Bill Glasson	74-72-80-71=297	+9	13,380
T61	(United States) Woody Austin	77-72-71-78=298	+10	12,840
T61	(United States) Russ Cochran	77-73-71-77=298	+10	12,840
T61	(United States) Jim Furyk	72-72-75-79=298	+10	12,840
T61	(United States) Corey Pavin	72-73-74-79=298	+10	12,840
T61	(United States) Kevin Wentworth	74-72-75-77=298	+10	12,840
T66	(South Africa) Fulton Allem	75-65-82-77=299	+11	12,120
T66	(United States) Doug Barron	72-74-76-77=299	+11	12,120
T66	(United States) Brandel Chamblee	74-74-73-78=299	+11	12,120
T66	(United States) Tom Kite (c)	75-72-77-75=299	+11	12,120
T66	(United States) Steve Lowery	76-74-71-78=299	+11	12,120
T66	(United States) Scott McCarron	78-67-77-77=299	+11	12,120
T66	(Wales) Ian Woosnam	76-74-70-79=299	+11	12,120
T73	(United States) Dan Forsman	77-73-75-75=300	+12	11,460
T73	(Scotland) Paul Lawrie	76-74-71-79=300	+12	11,460
T73	(United States) Ted Tryba	75-71-80-74=300	+12	11,460
T73	(United States) Brian Watts	77-71-74-78=300	+12	11,460
T77	(United States) Ronnie Black	74-76-70-81=301	+13	10,980
T77	(United States) Olin Browne	77-73-71-80=301	+13	10,980
T77	(United States) Brad Faxon	79-71-76-75=301	+13	10,980
T77	(United States) Nolan Henke	78-70-76-77=301	+13	10,980
CUT	(United States) Notah Begay III	80-71=151	+7	
CUT	(Northern Ireland) Darren Clarke	72-79=151	+7	
CUT	(United States) John Cook	74-77=151	+7	
CUT	(United States) Chris DiMarco	76-75=151	+7	
CUT	(United States) Skip Kendall	78-73=151	+7	
CUT	(United States) J. L. Lewis	77-74=151	+7	
CUT	(Sweden) Jesper Parnevik	78-73=151	+7	
CUT	(United States) Kevin Sutherland	77-74=151	+7	
CUT	(United States) Bob Tway	79-72=151	+7	
CUT	(South Africa) Retief Goosen	76-76=152	+8	
CUT	(United States) Charles Raulerson	78-74=152	+8	
CUT	(United States) Tom Scherrer	80-72=152	+8	
CUT	(United States) Mark Wiebe	78-74=152	+8	
CUT	(United States) Brent Geiberger	79-74=153	+9	
CUT	(Spain) Miguel Ángel Jiménez	79-74=153	+9	
CUT	(United States) Larry Mize	77-76=153	+9	
CUT	(United States) Tom Pernice Jr.	80-73=153	+9	
CUT	(United States) Tom Purtzer	76-77=153	+9	
CUT	(United States) Joey Sindelar	77-76=153	+9	
CUT	(United States) Billy Andrade	78-76=154	+10	
CUT	(United States) Jay Don Blake	79-75=154	+10	
CUT	(United States) Tom Byrum	78-76=154	+10	
CUT	(United States) Glen Day	77-77=154	+10	
CUT	(United States) Jay Delsing	76-78=154	+10	
CUT	(Spain) Sergio García	82-72=154	+10	
CUT	(United States) Jonathan Kaye	77-77=154	+10	
CUT	(United States) Rocco Mediate	76-78=154	+10	
CUT	(United States) Phil Mickelson	83-71=154	+10	
CUT	(Spain) José María Olazábal	77-77=154	+10	
CUT	(United States) Loren Roberts	80-74=154	+10	
CUT	(United States) Steve Stricker	76-78=154	+10	
CUT	(France) Jean van de Velde	78-76=154	+10	
CUT	(United States) Mark Calcavecchia	81-74=155	+11	
CUT	(United States) Paul Goydos	74-81=155	+11	
CUT	(United States) Tim Herron	84-71=155	+11	
CUT	(Sweden) Gabriel Hjertstedt	74-81=155	+11	
CUT	(United States) Dicky Pride	78-77=155	+11	
CUT	(United States) Mike Reid	77-78=155	+11	
CUT	(United States) Rich Beem	77-79=156	+12	
CUT	(United States) Eric Booker	78-78=156	+12	
CUT	(United States) Barry Cheesman	80-76=156	+12	
CUT	(United States) Matt Gogel	79-77=156	+12	
CUT	(United States) John Huston	81-75=156	+12	
CUT	(Namibia) Trevor Dodds	78-79=157	+13	
CUT	(United States) Jay Haas	79-78=157	+13	
CUT	(Australia) Bradley Hughes	81-76=157	+13	
CUT	(United States) Andrew Magee	77-80=157	+13	
CUT	(South Africa) Rory Sabbatini	77-80=157	+13	
CUT	(United States) Tommy Armour III	78-80=158	+14	
CUT	(United States) Ben Crenshaw	78-80=158	+14	
CUT	(United States) Brian Henninger	81-77=158	+14	
CUT	(United States) Duffy Waldorf	80-78=158	+14	
CUT	(United States) Bob Estes	84-75=159	+15	
CUT	(Australia) Wayne Grady	81-78=159	+15	
CUT	(United States) Dennis Paulson	80-79=159	+15	
CUT	(United States) Paul Stankowski	77-82=159	+15	
CUT	(United States) John Maginnes	84-76=160	+16	
CUT	(United States) Tommy Tolles	77-83=160	+16	
CUT	(Canada) Mike Weir	76-84=160	+16	
CUT	(United States) Craig Stadler	83-78=161	+17	
CUT	(United States) Franklin Langham	85-77=162	+18	
CUT	(United States) Mike Brisky	84-86=170	+26	
WD	(United States) Dudley Hart	79	+7	
WD	(Japan) Shigeki Maruyama	81	+9	
