= 2003 Masters Tournament =

American golf tournament held in 2003

- Front cover of the 2003 Masters Journal

Tournament information
- Dates: April 11–13, 2003
- Location: Augusta, Georgia; 33.503°N 82.020°W
- Course: Augusta National Golf Club
- Organized by: Augusta National Golf Club
- Tours: PGA Tour; European Tour; Japan Golf Tour

Statistics
- Par: 72
- Length: 7,290 yards (6,666 m)
- Field: 93 players, 49 after cut
- Cut: 149 (+5)
- Prize fund: US$6,000,000
- Winner's share: $1,080,000

Champion
- (Canada) Mike Weir
- 281 (−7), playoff
- Location in the United States Location in Georgia

The 2003 Masters Tournament was the 67th Tournament, held April 11–13 at Augusta National Golf Club in Augusta, Georgia. Mike Weir won his only major title in a one-hole playoff over Len Mattiace. He was the first Canadian man and first left-handed player to win the Masters and remains the only Canadian to win the tournament.

The start of the first round was delayed until early Friday morning due to successive days of heavy rain; the second round was started on Friday afternoon and completed on Saturday morning.

== Field ==
1. Masters champions

Tommy Aaron, Seve Ballesteros, Charles Coody, Fred Couples, Ben Crenshaw, Nick Faldo (10,11), Raymond Floyd, Bernhard Langer (16,17), Sandy Lyle, Larry Mize, Jack Nicklaus, José María Olazábal (10,14,16), Mark O'Meara (3), Arnold Palmer, Gary Player, Vijay Singh (4,10,14,15,16,17), Craig Stadler, Tom Watson, Tiger Woods (2,3,4,5,12,14,15,16,17), Ian Woosnam, Fuzzy Zoeller

- George Archer, Gay Brewer, Jack Burke Jr., Billy Casper, Doug Ford, Bob Goalby, Herman Keiser, and Byron Nelson did not play.

2. U.S. Open champions (last five years)

Retief Goosen (10,14,16,17), Lee Janzen

3. The Open champions (last five years)

David Duval (16,17), Ernie Els (10,14,15,16,17), Paul Lawrie (16)

4. PGA champions (last five years)

Rich Beem (14,16,17), David Toms (14,16,17)

5. The Players Championship winners (last three years)

Davis Love III (14,15,16,17), Craig Perks (14)

6. U.S. Amateur champion and runner-up

Ricky Barnes (a), Hunter Mahan (a)

7. The Amateur champion

Alejandro Larrazábal (a)

8. U.S. Amateur Public Links champion

Ryan Moore (a)

9. U.S. Mid-Amateur champion

George Zahringer (a)

10. Top 16 players and ties from the 2002 Masters

Ángel Cabrera (16,17), Chris DiMarco (14,16,17), Brad Faxon (14,16,17), Sergio García (11,14,16,17), Pádraig Harrington (11,16,17), Miguel Ángel Jiménez, Shigeki Maruyama (14,16,17), Phil Mickelson (11,14,16,17), Colin Montgomerie (16,17), Adam Scott (16,17)

11. Top eight players and ties from the 2002 U.S. Open

Tom Byrum, Scott Hoch (14,15,16,17), Jeff Maggert, Billy Mayfair, Nick Price (14,16,17)

12. Top four players and ties from 2002 PGA Championship

Fred Funk (14,16,17), Justin Leonard (14,15,16,17), Chris Riley (14,16,17)

13. Top four players and ties from the 2002 Open Championship

Stuart Appleby (14,16,17), Steve Elkington, Thomas Levet

14. Top 40 players from the 2002 PGA Tour money list

Robert Allenby (16,17), Jonathan Byrd, K. J. Choi (16,17), John Cook, Bob Estes (16,17), Jim Furyk (15,16,17), Charles Howell III (16,17), Jerry Kelly (16,17), Steve Lowery (16,17), Len Mattiace, Scott McCarron (16,17), Rocco Mediate (16,17), Craig Parry (16,17), Pat Perez, Kenny Perry (16,17), Loren Roberts, John Rollins, Jeff Sluman (16,17), Kevin Sutherland, Phil Tataurangi

15. Top 10 players from the 2003 PGA Tour money list on March 30

Chad Campbell, Jay Haas (17), Mike Weir (16,17)

16. Top 50 players from the final 2002 world ranking

Michael Campbell (17), Darren Clarke (17), Niclas Fasth (17), Toshimitsu Izawa, Shingo Katayama, Peter Lonard (17), Eduardo Romero (17), Justin Rose (17), Toru Taniguchi, Scott Verplank (17)

- Thomas Bjørn (17) did not play.

17. Top 50 players from world ranking published March 30

Tim Clark, John Huston, Tom Lehman, Kirk Triplett

18. Special foreign invitation

All the amateurs were playing in their first Masters, as were Rich Beem, Jonathan Byrd, Chad Campbell, K. J. Choi, Thomas Levet, Peter Lonard, Pat Perez, Chris Riley, John Rollins, Justin Rose, and Phil Tataurangi.

== Round summaries ==
=== First round ===
Friday, April 11, 2003

With play canceled due to rain on Thursday, the first round started at 7 am Friday with players teeing off at the 1st and 10th holes. The round was dominated by Darren Clarke, who posted a six-under 66. The score was even more impressive considering only seven shot under par for the round. Sergio García shot 69 (−3), in a second place tie with 2002 U.S. Amateur champion Ricky Barnes. Three-time major champion, Nick Price, shot 70 (−2), for a fourth place tie with Canadian Mike Weir. Two-time defending champ and three-time Masters champion, Tiger Woods shot a disappointing 76 (+4), ten strokes back.

Place	Player	Score	To par
1	(Northern Ireland) Darren Clarke	66	−6
T2	(United States) Ricky Barnes (a)	69	−3
T2	(Spain) Sergio García	69	−3
T4	(Zimbabwe) Nick Price	70	−2
T4	(Canada) Mike Weir	70	−2
T6	(Japan) Toru Taniguchi	71	−1
T6	(United States) David Toms	71	−1
T8	(South Africa) Tim Clark	72	E
T8	(United States) Jerry Kelly	72	E
T8	(Scotland) Paul Lawrie	72	E
T8	(United States) Jeff Maggert	72	E

=== Second round ===
Friday, April 11, 2003
Saturday, April 12, 2003

Due to the postponement of play on Thursday, the second round started at 2 pm on Friday with players starting at the 1st and 10th tees. In what proved to be another very difficult round at Augusta, Weir took a four stroke 36-hole lead with a four-under 68 for 138 (−6). Only 16 of the 93 competitors finished with a round below par, and only four were under par at the halfway mark. First round leader Clarke came back to earth with 76 (+4) for solo second at 142 (−2). Phil Mickelson charged up the leaderboard with a two-under 70 into a tie for third place with amateur Barnes. (Two other amateurs also made the cut, Hunter Mahan and Ryan Moore.) Five were tied for fifth place at even-par 144, including two former Masters champions in Vijay Singh and José María Olazábal. The round was completed on Saturday morning and the 36-hole cut was set at 149 (+5). The biggest name to fail to make the weekend was Colin Montgomerie.

Place	Player	Score	To par
1	(Canada) Mike Weir	70-68=138	−6
2	(Northern Ireland) Darren Clarke	66-76=142	−2
T3	(United States) Ricky Barnes (a)	69-74=143	−1
T3	(United States) Phil Mickelson	73-70=143	−1
T5	(United States) Brad Faxon	73-71=144	E
T5	(Scotland) Paul Lawrie	72-72=144	E
T5	(Spain) José María Olazábal	73-71=144	E
T5	(Fiji) Vijay Singh	73-71=144	E
T5	(United States) David Toms	71-73=144	E
T10	(United States) Jonathan Byrd	74-71=145	+1
T10	(South Korea) K. J. Choi	76-69=145	+1
T10	(South Africa) Ernie Els	79-66=145	+1
T10	(United States) Jim Furyk	73-72=145	+1
T10	(United States) Charles Howell III	73-72=145	+1
T10	(United States) Jeff Maggert	72-73=145	+1
T10	(United States) Hunter Mahan (a)	73-72=145	+1
T10	(United States) Billy Mayfair	75-70=145	+1
T10	(Zimbabwe) Nick Price	70-75=145	+1
T10	(United States) John Rollins	74-71=145	+1
T10	(New Zealand) Phil Tataurangi	75-70=145	+1

Amateurs: Barnes (-1), Mahan (+1), Moore (+3), Larrázabal (+19), Zahringer (+23).

=== Third round ===
Saturday, April 12, 2003

Following the completion of the second round on Saturday morning, "Moving day" lived up to its name in the third round as Jeff Maggert charged to the 54-hole lead with a six-under 66 for 211 (−5). Second round leader Weir shot 75 (+3) to fall back to 213 (−3), in solo second place and the final Sunday pairing with Maggert. Singh moved into a tie for third with another major champion in David Toms at 214 (−2). Woods matched the round of the day with a 66 (−6) to ascend the leaderboard to keep his bid for three-straight Masters alive. Mickelson and Olazábal were tied with Woods at 215 for fifth place. Len Mattiace shot 69 (−3) to get to even-par 216, five strokes back in a tie for eighth. The third round was completed late on Saturday, and the tournament was finally back on schedule.

Place	Player	Score	To par
1	(United States) Jeff Maggert	72-73-66=211	−5
2	(Canada) Mike Weir	70-68-75=213	−3
T3	(Fiji) Vijay Singh	73-71-70=214	−2
T3	(United States) David Toms	71-73-70=214	−2
T5	(United States) Phil Mickelson	73-70-72=215	−1
T5	(Spain) José María Olazábal	73-71-71=215	−1
T5	(United States) Tiger Woods	76-73-66=215	−1
T8	(United States) Jonathan Byrd	74-71-71=216	E
T8	(United States) Jim Furyk	73-72-71=216	E
T8	(United States) Len Mattiace	73-74-69=216	E

=== Final round ===
Sunday, April 13, 2003

==== Summary ====
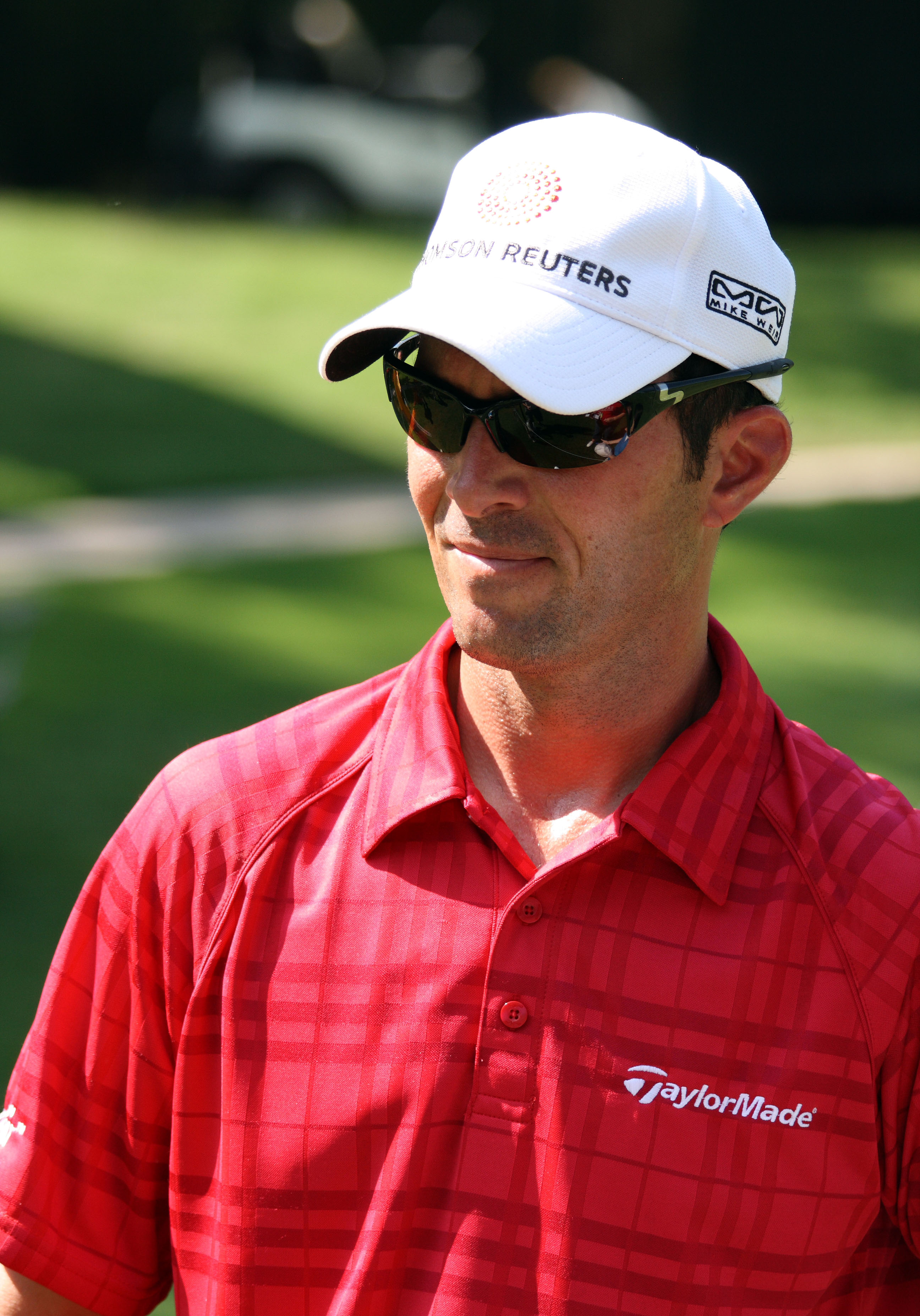
Mike Weir won his first Masters title

External videos
- Full final round coverage on CBS on YouTube

Despite one of the largest major championship final round comebacks by Mattiace, Mike Weir bested him in a sudden death playoff for his first major title. Weir became the first Canadian male ever to win a major championship, and also became the first left-handed player to win the Masters. The sudden death playoff at the par 4 10th was the only extra hole needed, as Weir's bogey was good enough as Mattiace double-bogeyed the hole. Weir recovered from his disappointing third round with his second 68 of the tournament to force the playoff. To get into the sudden death playoff, Weir made a 7-foot (2 m) putt for par on the 18th green. Mattiace's only bogey (besides the playoff hole) of his tournament-low 65 (−7) was at the 18th hole. He teed off forty minutes and four groups ahead of the final pairing, so Mattiace had about an hour between the completion of his round and the start of the playoff.

Third round leader Maggert shot a disappointing 75 (+3) to finish in solo fifth place. Maggert had no bogeys or double bogeys, but made a triple bogey 7 on the third hole and a quintuple bogey 8 on the twelfth hole. Mickelson's 68 (−4) was only enough for solo third, two strokes behind Weir and Mattiace. It marked Mickelson's third straight third-place finish at the Masters (he would win the green jacket in 2004, 2006, and 2010). Jim Furyk also shot a four-under 68 for a fourth-place finish which equaled his best Masters finish at 284 (−4). (He would win the next major, at the U.S. Open in June.) Ernie Els and Singh rounded out the under par finishers at 287 (−1), in a tie for sixth. Toms shot 74 and fell back to even-par 288, in a five-way tie for eighth. Woods' bid for his third straight Masters victory came up well short with a disappointing 75 (+3) for 290 (+2), nine strokes back. Amateur Barnes was the low-amateur, after being near the top of the leaderboard the first two rounds.

This was the last year the sudden-death playoff began on the 10th tee. Beginning in 2004, the playoff starting point was changed to the 18th hole, which then alternated with the 10th hole until a winner emerged; the first use was in 2005.

==== Final leaderboard ====
Champion
Silver Cup winner (low amateur)
(a) = amateur
(c) = past champion

Top 10
Place	Player	Score	To par	Money (US$)
T1	(United States) Len Mattiace	73-74-69-65=281	−7	Playoff
T1	(Canada) Mike Weir	70-68-75-68=281	−7	Playoff
3	(United States) Phil Mickelson	73-70-72-68=283	−5	408,000
4	(United States) Jim Furyk	73-72-71-68=284	−4	288,000
5	(United States) Jeff Maggert	72-73-66-75=286	−2	240,000
T6	(South Africa) Ernie Els	79-66-72-70=287	−1	208,500
T6	(Fiji) Vijay Singh (c)	73-71-70-73=287	−1	208,500
T8	(United States) Jonathan Byrd	74-71-71-72=288	E	162,000
T8	(Spain) José María Olazábal (c)	73-71-71-73=288	E	162,000
T8	(United States) Mark O'Meara (c)	76-71-70-71=288	E	162,000
T8	(United States) David Toms	71-73-70-74=288	E	162,000
T8	(United States) Scott Verplank	76-73-70-69=288	E	162,000

Leaderboard below the top 10
Place	Player	Score	To par	Money ($)
T13	(South Africa) Tim Clark	72-75-71-71=289	+1	120,000
T13	(South Africa) Retief Goosen	73-74-72-70=289	+1	120,000
T15	(United States) Rich Beem	74-72-71-73=290	+2	93,000
T15	(Argentina) Ángel Cabrera	76-71-71-72=290	+2	93,000
T15	(South Korea) K. J. Choi	76-69-72-73=290	+2	93,000
T15	(Scotland) Paul Lawrie	72-72-73-73=290	+2	93,000
T15	(United States) Davis Love III	77-71-71-71=290	+2	93,000
T15	(United States) Tiger Woods (c)	76-73-66-75=290	+2	93,000
21	(United States) Ricky Barnes (a)	69-74-75-73=291	+3	0
22	(United States) Bob Estes	76-71-74-71=292	+4	72,000
T23	(United States) Brad Faxon	73-71-79-70=293	+5	57,600
T23	(United States) Scott McCarron	77-71-72-73=293	+5	57,600
T23	(Zimbabwe) Nick Price	70-75-72-76=293	+5	57,600
T23	(United States) Chris Riley	76-72-70-75=293	+5	57,600
T23	(Australia) Adam Scott	77-72-74-70=293	+5	57,600
T28	(Northern Ireland) Darren Clarke	66-76-78-74=294	+6	43,500
T28	(United States) Fred Couples (c)	73-75-69-77=294	+6	43,500
T28	(Spain) Sergio García	69-78-74-73=294	+6	43,500
T28	(United States) Charles Howell III	73-72-76-73=294	+6	43,500
T28	(United States) Hunter Mahan (a)	73-72-73-76=294	+6	0
T33	(England) Nick Faldo (c)	74-73-75-73=295	+7	36,375
T33	(United States) Rocco Mediate	73-74-73-75=295	+7	36,375
T33	(United States) Loren Roberts	74-72-76-73=295	+7	36,375
T33	(United States) Kevin Sutherland	77-72-76-70=295	+7	36,375
T37	(Japan) Shingo Katayama	74-72-76-74=296	+8	31,650
T37	(United States) Billy Mayfair	75-70-77-74=296	+8	31,650
T39	(Australia) Robert Allenby	76-73-74-74=297	+9	27,000
T39	(Australia) Craig Parry	74-73-75-75=297	+9	27,000
T39	(United States) Kenny Perry	76-72-78-71=297	+9	27,000
T39	(England) Justin Rose	73-76-71-77=297	+9	27,000
T39	(New Zealand) Phil Tataurangi	75-70-74-78=297	+9	27,000
44	(United States) Jeff Sluman	75-72-76-75=298	+10	23,400
T45	(United States) Ryan Moore (a)	73-74-75-79=301	+13	0
T45	(United States) Pat Perez	74-73-79-75=301	+13	22,200
47	(United States) John Rollins	74-71-80-77=302	+14	21,000
48	(United States) Jerry Kelly	72-76-77-79=304	+16	19,800
49	(United States) Craig Stadler (c)	76-73-79-77=305	+17	18,600
CUT	(Republic of Ireland) Pádraig Harrington	77-73=150	+6	
CUT	(United States) Scott Hoch	77-73=150	+6	
CUT	(Japan) Shigeki Maruyama	75-75=150	+6	
CUT	(Argentina) Eduardo Romero	74-76=150	+6	
CUT	(Japan) Toru Taniguchi	71-79=150	+6	
CUT	(Australia) Steve Elkington	75-76=151	+7	
CUT	(United States) Lee Janzen	78-73=151	+7	
CUT	(United States) Tom Lehman	75-76=151	+7	
CUT	(United States) Larry Mize (c)	78-74=152	+8	
CUT	(United States) Tom Watson (c)	75-77=152	+8	
CUT	(Australia) Stuart Appleby	77-76=153	+9	
CUT	(Spain) Miguel Ángel Jiménez	76-77=153	+9	
CUT	(United States) Chad Campbell	77-77=154	+10	
CUT	(Sweden) Niclas Fasth	81-73=154	+10	
CUT	(Japan) Toshimitsu Izawa	78-76=154	+10	
CUT	(United States) Steve Lowery	78-76=154	+10	
CUT	(Scotland) Colin Montgomerie	78-76=154	+10	
CUT	(United States) Kirk Triplett	82-72=154	+10	
CUT	(Wales) Ian Woosnam (c)	80-74=154	+10	
CUT	(New Zealand) Michael Campbell	78-77=155	+11	
CUT	(United States) Ben Crenshaw (c)	79-76=155	+11	
CUT	(United States) Fred Funk	79-76=155	+11	
CUT	(United States) Jay Haas	79-76=155	+11	
CUT	(Germany) Bernhard Langer (c)	79-76=155	+11	
CUT	(United States) Justin Leonard	82-73=155	+11	
CUT	(Scotland) Sandy Lyle (c)	82-73=155	+11	
CUT	(New Zealand) Craig Perks	80-75=155	+11	
CUT	(United States) Fuzzy Zoeller (c)	77-78=155	+11	
CUT	(United States) John Cook	78-78=156	+12	
CUT	(United States) John Huston	73-83=156	+12	
CUT	(France) Thomas Levet	79-77=156	+12	
CUT	(United States) Tom Byrum	82-75=157	+13	
CUT	(United States) Raymond Floyd (c)	77-80=157	+13	
CUT	(Australia) Peter Lonard	78-82=160	+16	
CUT	(Spain) Seve Ballesteros (c)	77-85=162	+18	
CUT	(United States) David Duval	79-83=162	+18	
CUT	(United States) Jack Nicklaus (c)	85-77=162	+18	
CUT	(South Africa) Gary Player (c)	82-80=162	+18	
CUT	(Spain) Alejandro Larrazábal (a)	82-81=163	+19	
CUT	(United States) Charles Coody (c)	83-81=164	+20	
CUT	(United States) Arnold Palmer (c)	83-83=166	+22	
CUT	(United States) George Zahringer (a)	82-85=167	+23	
CUT	(United States) Tommy Aaron (c)	92-80=172	+28	
WD	(United States) Chris DiMarco	82	+10	

==== Scorecard ====
Hole	1	2	3	4	5	6	7	8	9	10	11	12	13	14	15	16	17	18
Par	4	5	4	3	4	3	4	5	4	4	4	3	5	4	5	3	4	4
(Canada) Weir	−3	−4	−4	−4	−4	−5	−5	−5	−5	−5	−5	−5	−6	−6	−7	−7	−7	−7
(United States) Mattiace	E	−1	−2	−2	−2	−2	−2	−3	−3	−4	−4	−4	−6	−6	−7	−8	−8	−7
(United States) Mickelson	−1	−2	−2	−2	−2	−1	−2	−2	−2	−2	−2	−2	−3	−3	−4	−4	−4	−5
(United States) Furyk	E	−1	−1	−1	−1	−1	−1	−2	−2	−2	−2	−1	−1	−1	−3	−3	−4	−4
(United States) Maggert	−5	−5	−2	−2	−3	−3	−3	−3	−3	−4	−4	+1	+1	E	−1	−2	−2	−2
(South Africa) Els	E	E	+1	+1	+2	+1	+1	E	−1	−1	E	E	−1	−1	−1	−1	−1	−1
(Fiji) Singh	−2	−3	−3	−3	−2	−2	−2	−2	−2	−3	−4	−3	−2	−2	−1	−1	−1	−1
(United States) Toms	−1	−2	−2	−2	−2	−2	−1	−2	−2	−2	−2	−1	E	+1	+1	E	E	E
(United States) Woods	−1	−2	E	+1	+1	+1	+2	+3	+2	+2	+2	+2	+1	+2	+2	+2	+2	+2

Cumulative tournament scores, relative to par

Eagle	Birdie	Bogey	Double bogey	Triple bogey+

=== Playoff ===
Place	Player	Score	To par	Money (US$)
1	(Canada) Mike Weir	5	+1	1,080,000
2	(United States) Len Mattiace	x		648,000

- Sudden-death playoff began and ended on par-4 10th hole; Weir's bogey defeated Mattiace.
