= 1996 Nike Tour graduates =

This is a list of players who graduated from the Nike Tour in 1996. The top ten players on the Nike Tour's money list in 1996 earned their PGA Tour card for 1997.

	1996 Nike Tour		1997 PGA Tour				
Player	Money list rank	Earnings ($)	Starts	Cuts made	Best finish	Money list rank	Earnings ($)
(United States) Stewart Cink*	1	251,699	31	19	Win	29	809,580
(United States) Michael Christie*	2	193,971	33	17	T6	112	204,883
(United States) Joe Durant	3	159,386	31	19	T5	100	240,936
(United States) David Berganio Jr.*	4	146,047	30	14	T9	155	118,290
(United States) Brett Quigley*	5	123,763	34	21	T12	128	172,023
(United States) Dave Rummells	6	122,778	11	7	T7	172	90,345
(United States) P. H. Horgan III	7	120,760	30	15	5	105	226,249
(United States) Lee Porter	8	108,030	32	8	T7	196	62,136
(United States) Skip Kendall	9	107,396	31	22	3	74	320,800
(United States) Eric Johnson*	10	103,929	30	11	T12	171	92,091

*PGA Tour rookie for 1997.

T = Tied
Green background indicates the player retained his PGA Tour card for 1998 (won or finished inside the top 125).
Yellow background indicates player did not retain his PGA Tour card for 1998, but retained conditional status (finished between 126–150).
Red background indicates the player did not retain his PGA Tour card for 1998 (finished outside the top 150).

== Winners on the PGA Tour in 1997 ==
No.	Date	Player	Tournament	Winning score	Margin of victory	Runners-up
1	Jul 27	(United States) Stewart Cink	Canon Greater Hartford Open	−13 (69-67-65-66=267)	1 stroke	(United States) Tom Byrum, (United States) Brandel Chamblee, (United States) Jeff Maggert

== See also ==
- 1996 PGA Tour Qualifying School graduates
