= Charles Edwin Brown =

American gridiron football player (1936–2022)

Charles Edward Brown (August 1, 1936 – December 20, 2022) was an American professional football player. An offensive tackle, he played collegiately for the SMU Mustangs and the Houston Cougars; he played professionally for the Edmonton Eskimos of the CFL and one season for the 1962 American Football League's (AFL) Oakland Raiders.

Brown was born in Talco, Texas, on August 1, 1936. He attended Mount Vernon High School in Mount Vernon, Texas. He was the father of former PGA Tour golfer Billy Ray Brown.

Brown died on December 20, 2022, at the age of 86.

== See also ==
- List of American Football League players
