= 1996 PGA Tour Qualifying School graduates =

This is a list of the 49 players who earned 1997 PGA Tour cards through the PGA Tour Qualifying Tournament in 1996.

| Place | Player | PGA Tour starts | Cuts made | Notes |
|---|---|---|---|---|
| T1 | (United States) Allen Doyle | 35 | 19 | 3 Nike Tour wins |
| T1 | (United States) Jimmy Johnston | 30 | 7 | |
| T3 | (United States) Doug Barron | 1 | 0 | |
| T3 | (United States) Chip Sullivan | 2 | 0 | |
| T5 | (United States) Jimmy Green | 3 | 1 | 1 Nike Tour win |
| T5 | (United States) Tom Pernice Jr. | 133 | 50 | |
| T7 | (United States) Brent Geiberger | 0 | 0 | |
| T7 | (New Zealand) Phil Tataurangi | 25 | 10 | 1 Nike Tour win; 1 PGA Tour of Australasia win |
| T9 | (Sweden) Gabriel Hjertstedt | 0 | 0 | |
| T9 | (United States) Larry Silveira | 134 | 60 | 1 Nike Tour win |
| T9 | (United States) Tommy Armour III | 261 | 123 | 1 PGA Tour win |
| T9 | (United States) Shaun Micheel | 22 | 4 | |
| T9 | (United States) J. P. Hayes | 59 | 24 | 1 Nike Tour win |
| T9 | (United States) Mike Standly | 184 | 101 | 1 PGA Tour win |
| T9 | (United States) Shane Bertsch | 29 | 9 | |
| T16 | (United States) Donnie Hammond | 348 | 247 | 2 PGA Tour wins |
| T16 | (United States) David Sutherland | 39 | 16 | |
| T16 | (United States) Robert Damron | 1 | 0 | |
| T16 | (Japan) Hideki Kase | 5 | 3 | 3 Japan Golf Tour wins |
| T16 | (United States) John Dowdall | 48 | 12 | 1 Nike Tour win |
| T21 | (United States) Jack O'Keefe | 1 | 0 | |
| T21 | (United States) Kevin Burton | 3 | 2 | |
| T21 | (United States) Sonny Skinner | 58 | 23 | 2 Nike Tour wins |
| T21 | (United States) Jeff Hart | 101 | 47 | |
| T21 | (United States) Craig Kanada | 5 | 1 | |
| T21 | (Sweden) Adam Mednick | 1 | 0 | 5 Challenge Tour wins |
| T21 | (United States) Larry Rinker | 395 | 229 | |
| T21 | (Mexico) Rafael Alarcón | 38 | 9 | |
| T21 | (United States) Tom Byrum | 306 | 163 | 1 PGA Tour win |
| T21 | (United States) Todd Demsey | 7 | 3 | |
| T21 | (United States) Billy Ray Brown | 234 | 129 | 2 PGA Tour wins |
| T21 | (United States) Tray Tyner | 82 | 30 | |
| T33 | (United States) Kevin Sutherland | 35 | 22 | |
| T33 | (United States) Jim McGovern | 195 | 112 | 1 PGA Tour win |
| T33 | (United States) Tony Mollica | 1 | 1 | |
| T33 | (United States) Frank Lickliter | 30 | 15 | 1 Nike Tour win |
| T37 | (United States) Tim Simpson | 512 | 349 | 4 PGA Tour wins |
| T37 | (Canada) Dave Barr | 480 | 304 | 2 PGA Tour wins |
| T37 | (United States) Bob Wolcott | 138 | 64 | |
| T37 | (United States) Jay Delsing | 351 | 179 | |
| T37 | (Australia) Bradley Hughes | 21 | 10 | 4 PGA Tour of Australasia wins |
| T37 | (Australia) Stuart Appleby | 30 | 18 | 2 Nike Tour wins |
| T37 | (United States) Spike McRoy | 1 | 0 | |
| T37 | (United States) Paul Tesori | 0 | 0 | |
| T37 | (United States) Craig Bowden | 0 | 0 | |
| T37 | (United States) Brad Sutterfield | 0 | 0 | |
| T37 | (United States) Anthony Rodriguez | 7 | 5 | |
| T37 | (United States) Brian Henninger | 107 | 58 | 1 PGA Tour win |
| T37 | (United States) Paul Claxton | 0 | 0 | |

PGA Tour rookie in 1997

== 1997 Results ==
| Player | Starts | Cuts made | Best finish | Money list rank | Earnings ($) |
|---|---|---|---|---|---|
| (United States) Allen Doyle | 28 | 13 | T26 | 189 | 66,555 |
| (United States) Jimmy Johnston | 31 | 12 | T2 | 132 | 163,202 |
| (United States) Doug Barron* | 31 | 21 | T6 | 116 | 198,051 |
| (United States) Chip Sullivan* | 27 | 11 | T36 | 215 | 41,019 |
| (United States) Jimmy Green* | 31 | 12 | T19 | 197 | 61,153 |
| (United States) Tom Pernice Jr. | 30 | 12 | 4 | 127 | 173,012 |
| (United States) Brent Geiberger* | 29 | 19 | T2 | 62 | 395,472 |
| (New Zealand) Phil Tataurangi | 28 | 12 | 3 | 96 | 256,930 |
| (Sweden) Gabriel Hjertstedt* | 23 | 11 | Win | 89 | 279,624 |
| (United States) Larry Silveira | 24 | 6 | T20 | 222 | 36,356 |
| (United States) Tommy Armour III | 30 | 18 | T17 | 131 | 163,664 |
| (United States) Shaun Micheel | 21 | 5 | T49 | 250 | 14,519 |
| (United States) J. P. Hayes | 29 | 18 | T8 | 135 | 160,722 |
| (United States) Mike Standly | 28 | 14 | 2 | 75 | 318,939 |
| (United States) Shane Bertsch | 30 | 11 | T19 | 182 | 73,480 |
| (United States) Donnie Hammond | 21 | 12 | T2 | 106 | 224,799 |
| (United States) David Sutherland | 28 | 14 | T2 | 84 | 288,663 |
| (United States) Robert Damron* | 32 | 17 | T3 | 53 | 455,604 |
| (Japan) Hideki Kase* | 30 | 14 | 15 | 152 | 120,478 |
| (United States) John Dowdall | 24 | 6 | T31 | 232 | 27,389 |
| (United States) Jack O'Keefe* | 27 | 10 | T13 | 175 | 85,220 |
| (United States) Kevin Burton* | 26 | 10 | T6 | 178 | 78,534 |
| (United States) Sonny Skinner | 25 | 9 | T13 | 206 | 46,328 |
| (United States) Jeff Hart | 28 | 12 | T21 | 188 | 67,829 |
| (United States) Craig Kanada* | 23 | 5 | T28 | 234 | 25,125 |
| (Sweden) Adam Mednick* | 18 | 14 | T20 | 237 | 23,801 |
| (United States) Larry Rinker | 33 | 15 | T8 | 124 | 188,281 |
| (Mexico) Rafael Alarcón | 26 | 13 | T19 | 176 | 79,928 |
| (United States) Tom Byrum | 27 | 21 | T2 | 42 | 525,161 |
| (United States) Todd Demsey* | 27 | 9 | T24 | 214 | 41,774 |
| (United States) Billy Ray Brown | 24 | 11 | Win | 91 | 268,709 |
| (United States) Tray Tyner | 27 | 9 | T15 | 199 | 57,355 |
| (United States) Kevin Sutherland | 27 | 17 | 2 | 52 | 455,860 |
| (United States) Jim McGovern | 32 | 13 | T7 | 144 | 140,756 |
| (United States) Tony Mollica* | 21 | 2 | T65 | 294 | 6,225 |
| (United States) Frank Lickliter | 30 | 14 | T4 | 107 | 221,049 |
| (United States) Tim Simpson | 25 | 7 | T23 | 224 | 33,166 |
| (Canada) Dave Barr | 4 | 1 | T38 | 300 | 5,400 |
| (United States) Bob Wolcott | 27 | 8 | T10 | 195 | 62,653 |
| (United States) Jay Delsing | 28 | 14 | T7 | 167 | 102,592 |
| (Australia) Bradley Hughes* | 27 | 12 | T8 | 142 | 142,793 |
| (Australia) Stuart Appleby | 23 | 18 | Win | 18 | 1,003,356 |
| (United States) Spike McRoy* | 27 | 7 | T19 | 190 | 66,274 |
| (United States) Paul Tesori* | 12 | 0 | Cut | n/a | 0 |
| (United States) Craig Bowden* | 21 | 8 | T23 | 218 | 40,118 |
| (United States) Brad Sutterfield* | 20 | 4 | T23 | 243 | 18,649 |
| (United States) Anthony Rodriguez* | 25 | 6 | T13 | 208 | 45,319 |
| (United States) Brian Henninger | 25 | 15 | T2 | 71 | 329,864 |
| (United States) Paul Claxton* | 23 | 10 | 12 | 177 | 79,118 |

*PGA Tour rookie in 1997
T = Tied
The player retained his PGA Tour card for 1998 (finished inside the top 125)
The player did not retain his PGA Tour card for 1998, but retained conditional status (finished between 126-150)
The player did not retain his PGA Tour card for 1998 (finished outside the top 150)

== Winners on the PGA Tour in 1997 ==
| No. | Date | Player | Tournament | Winning score | Margin of victory | Runner(s)-up |
|---|---|---|---|---|---|---|
| 1 | Mar 16 | (Australia) Stuart Appleby | Honda Classic | −14 (68-68-67-71=274) | 1 stroke | (United States) Michael Bradley (United States) Payne Stewart |
| 2 | Jul 20 | (United States) Billy Ray Brown | Deposit Guaranty Golf Classic | −17 (69-66-69-67=271) | 1 stroke | (United States) Mike Standly |
| 3 | Sep 28 | (Sweden) Gabriel Hjertstedt | B.C. Open | −13 (70-69-66-70=275) | 1 stroke | (United States) Andrew Magee (United States) Chris Perry (United States) Lee Rinker |

== Runners-up on the PGA Tour in 1997 ==
| No. | Date | Player | Tournament | Winner | Winning score | Runner-up score |
|---|---|---|---|---|---|---|
| 1 | Feb 9 | (United States) Donnie Hammond | Buick Invitational | (United States) Mark O'Meara | −13 (67-66-71-71=275) | −11 (73-67-68-69=277) |
| 2 | Mar 23 | (Australia) Stuart Appleby | Bay Hill Invitational | (United States) Phil Mickelson | −16 (72-65-70-65=272) | −13 (73-63-70-69=275) |
| 3 | May 4 | (United States) Kevin Sutherland; Lost in playoff | Shell Houston Open | (United States) Phil Blackmar | −12 (68-71-67-70=276) | −12 (68-72-66-70=276) |
| 4 | May 11 | (United States) Brian Henninger | BellSouth Classic | (United States) Scott McCarron | −14 (70-69-66-69=274) | −11 (70-71-68-68=277) |
| 5 | Jul 13 | (United States) Jimmy Johnston | Quad City Classic | (United States) David Toms | −15 (67-66-67-65=265) | −12 (70-67-69-62=268) |
| 6 | Jul 20 | (United States) Mike Standly | Deposit Guaranty Golf Classic | (United States) Billy Ray Brown | −17 (69-66-69-67=271) | −16 (69-67-70-66=272) |
| 7 | Jul 27 | (United States) Tom Byrum | Canon Greater Hartford Open | (United States) Stewart Cink | −13 (69-67-65-66=267) | −12 (66-68-65-69=268) |
| 8 | Aug 3 | (Australia) Stuart Appleby (2) | Sprint International | (United States) Phil Mickelson | 48 points (14-13-12-9) | 41 points (9-10-13-9) |
| 9 | Aug 10 | (United States) Tom Byrum (2) | Buick Open | (Fiji) Vijay Singh | −15 (67-73-67-66=273) | −11 (72-68-70-67=277) |
| 10 | Aug 31 | (United States) David Sutherland | Greater Milwaukee Open | (United States) Scott Hoch | −16 (70-66-66-66=268) | −15 (70-65-65-69=269) |
| 11 | Sep 21 | (United States) Brent Geiberger | LaCantera Texas Open | (United States) Tim Herron | −17 (71-67-64-69=271) | −15 (67-72-69-65=273) |

== See also ==
- 1996 Nike Tour graduates
