= Jim Benepe =

American professional golfer (born 1963)

Personal information
- Full name: James L. Benepe III
- Nationality: United States
- Born: October 24, 1963 (age 63) Sheridan, Wyoming, U.S.
- Height: 5 ft 7 in (1.70 m)
- Weight: 150 lb (68 kg; 11 st)
- Spouse: Barbara

Career
- Sport: Golf
- College: Northwestern University
- Turned professional: 1986
- Former tours: PGA Tour; Canadian Tour
- Professional wins: 3

Number of wins by tour
- PGA Tour: 1
- PGA Tour of Australasia: 1
- Other: 1

Best results in major championships
- Masters Tournament: CUT: 1989, 1991
- PGA Championship: CUT: 1988
- U.S. Open: T14: 1990
- The Open Championship: T28: 1988

Achievements and awards
- Canadian Tour Order of Merit winner: 1987
- PGA Tour Rookie of the Year: 1988

James L. Benepe III (born October 24, 1963) is an American professional golfer who played on the PGA Tour and Nationwide Tour.

== Early life and amateur career ==
Benepe was born, raised and lived most of his life in Sheridan, Wyoming. He attended Northwestern University and was a first-team All-American in 1986 and the 1986 Big Ten Champion while a member of the golf team.

== Professional career ==
In 1986, Benepe turned pro. The following year, Benepe played his first full-year as a professional golfer. He played internationally on the Asia Golf Circuit, PGA Tour of Australasia, and the Canadian Tour. That year, he won the 1987 British Columbia Open in Canada; and was the winner of the Canadian Tour's Order of Merit and Rookie of the Year awards. The following year, in February 1988, he won Victorian Open in Melbourne, Australia.

Benepe won the 1988 Beatrice Western Open, the first PGA Tour event he played in. The tournament was held at Butler National GC in Oak Brook, Illinois that year, and he only got in through a last-minute sponsor exemption. Benepe used a local caddie, James Tunney, to help him achieve his victory. Peter Jacobsen double bogeyed the 72nd hole, which gave Benepe the victory. It turned out to be his only career win in an official PGA Tour event. He won the PGA Tour's 1988 Rookie of the Year honors. He is still the only person to win a PGA Tour event on his first attempt and the only Wyoming-born PGA Tour winner.

Benepe left the PGA Tour at the end of the 1991 season after struggling the previous several years with back problems and technical problems with his game. After leaving the Tour, he came home to Sheridan and began working in real estate sales and promotions. After a long hiatus, he began playing competitive tour golf again in the late 1990s in Australia, on the PGA Tour and in about 15 events per year on the Nationwide Tour. Benepe finished 26th on the Nationwide Tour in 2001 with 6 top-10 finishes and 16th on the Australian Order of Merit.

Today he works in the corporate world consulting in various aviation arenas and lives in Sheridan, Wyoming with his wife.

== Awards and honors ==
- In 1987, Benepe earned the Canadian Tour's Order of Merit
- In 1987, he earned the Canadian Tour's Rookie of the Year award
- In 1988, Benepe won the PGA Tour Rookie of the Year award
- In 2006, he was inducted into the Wyoming Sports & Wyoming State Golf Association Hall of Fames
- In 2008, Benepe was inducted into the Northwestern Sports Hall of Fame

== Amateur wins (3) ==
- 1982 Wyoming Stroke Play Championship, Western Junior
- 1983 Wyoming State Match Play Championship

== Professional wins (3) ==
=== PGA Tour wins (1) ===
| No. | Date | Tournament | Winning score | Margin of victory | Runner-up |
|---|---|---|---|---|---|
| 1 | Jul 3, 1988 | Beatrice Western Open | −10 (71-68-69-70=278) | 1 stroke | (United States) Peter Jacobsen |

=== PGA Tour of Australia wins (1) ===
| No. | Date | Tournament | Winning score | Margin of victory | Runners-up |
|---|---|---|---|---|---|
| 1 | Feb 14, 1988 | Victorian Open | −6 (69-68-74-71=282) | 3 strokes | (Australia) Ian Baker-Finch, (Australia) Peter McWhinney |

=== Canadian Tour wins (1) ===
| No. | Date | Tournament | Winning score | Margin of victory | Runners-up |
|---|---|---|---|---|---|
| 1 | Aug 30, 1987 | George Williams B.C. Open | −9 (69-65-70=204) | 2 strokes | (United States) Jim Hallet, (Canada) Jim Rutledge |

== Results in major championships ==
| Tournament | 1988 | 1989 | 1990 | 1991 | ... | 2005 |
|---|---|---|---|---|---|---|
| Masters Tournament | | CUT | | CUT | | |
| U.S. Open | | | T14 | CUT | | CUT |
| The Open Championship | T28 | | | | | |
| PGA Championship | CUT | | | | | |

Did not play

CUT = missed the half-way cut
"T" = tied

== See also ==
- 1990 PGA Tour Qualifying School graduates
