= Len Mattiace =

American professional golfer (born 1967)

Personal information
- Full name: Leonard Earl Mattiace
- Nationality: United States
- Born: October 15, 1967 (age 59) Mineola, New York, U.S.
- Height: 6 ft 1 in (1.85 m)
- Weight: 185 lb (84 kg; 13.2 st)
- Children: 2

Career
- Sport: Golf
- College: Wake Forest University
- Turned professional: 1990
- Current tour: PGA Tour Champions
- Former tours: PGA Tour; Web.com Tour
- Professional wins: 2
- Highest ranking: 24 (May 11, 2003)

Number of wins by tour
- PGA Tour: 2

Best results in major championships
- Masters Tournament: 2nd: 2003
- PGA Championship: T48: 2002
- U.S. Open: T24: 1997
- The Open Championship: T30: 1999

Leonard Earl Mattiace (/məˈtiːs/; born October 15, 1967) is an American professional golfer, formerly of the PGA Tour and now playing on the PGA Tour Champions.

== Early life and amateur career ==
Mattiace was born in Mineola, New York. He attended Nease High School in Ponte Vedra, Florida.

Mattiace graduated from Wake Forest University in 1990 with a degree in sociology. While at Wake Forest, he played on the team that won the NCAA Division I Golf Championship in 1986.

== Professional career ==
In 1990, Mattiace turned pro. He first gained notability when he surged into contention in the final round of the 1998 Players Championship. Trailing by one shot going into the par-3 17th hole, he hit his tee shot into the water, his third shot into a bunker, and his fourth shot into the water. He ended up with a quintuple-bogey 8 on the hole and finished in a tie for fifth, four strokes behind the eventual winner Justin Leonard.

Mattiace's career year was 2002, when he earned wins at the Nissan Open (his 220th PGA Tour start) and the FedEx St. Jude Classic. In 2003, he contended in the Masters Tournament by shooting a 65 in the final round which put him into a playoff with Mike Weir. On the first playoff hole, Mattiace found himself stymied by trees when his approach drifted offline. Weir needed only a bogey to secure the victory and Mattiace finished second, earning $648,000 in prize money. Shortly after the 2003 season, Mattiace's career was threatened by a skiing accident and torn ACLs in both knees.

Mattiace was not fully exempt on the PGA Tour after the 2005 season. He made his PGA Tour Champions debut in March 2018 at the Cologuard Classic.

Mattiace is naturally left-handed but plays right-handed.

== Amateur wins ==
this list may be incomplete

- 1984 FL State High School Champion
- 1984 Dixie Amateur
- 1985 Southern Amateur
- 1989 Dixie Amateur

== Professional wins (2) ==
=== PGA Tour wins (2) ===
No.	Date	Tournament	Winning score	Margin of victory	Runner(s)-up
1	Feb 17, 2002	Nissan Open	−15 (69-65-67-68=269)	1 stroke	(United States) Brad Faxon, (South Africa) Rory Sabbatini, (United States) Scott McCarron
2	Jun 30, 2002	FedEx St. Jude Classic	−18 (69-68-65-64=266)	1 stroke	(United States) Tim Petrovic

PGA Tour playoff record (0–2)

No.	Year	Tournament	Opponent(s)	Result
1	1996	Buick Challenge	(United States) Michael Bradley, (United States) Fred Funk, (United States) Davis Love III, (United States) John Maginnes	Bradley won with birdie on first extra hole
2	2003	Masters Tournament	(Canada) Mike Weir	Lost to bogey on first extra hole

== Results in major championships ==
Tournament	1988	1989
Masters Tournament	CUT	
U.S. Open		
The Open Championship		
PGA Championship		

Tournament	1990	1991	1992	1993	1994	1995	1996	1997	1998	1999
Masters Tournament										
U.S. Open								T24		T42
The Open Championship										T30
PGA Championship								CUT	CUT	

Tournament	2000	2001	2002	2003	2004	2005
Masters Tournament				2	CUT	
U.S. Open			T68	T57		CUT
The Open Championship			T69	T65		
PGA Championship		CUT	T48	T51		

Top 10
Did not play

CUT = missed the half-way cut
"T" = tied

=== Summary ===
Tournament	Wins	2nd	3rd	Top-5	Top-10	Top-25	Events	Cuts made
Masters Tournament	0	1	0	1	1	1	3	1
U.S. Open	0	0	0	0	0	1	5	4
The Open Championship	0	0	0	0	0	0	3	3
PGA Championship	0	0	0	0	0	0	5	2
Totals	0	1	0	1	1	2	16	10

- Most consecutive cuts made – 7 (2002 U.S. Open – 2003 PGA)
- Longest streak of top-10s – 1

== Results in The Players Championship ==
Tournament	1997	1998	1999	2000	2001	2002	2003	2004	2005
The Players Championship	T24	T5	CUT	T9	CUT	T69	CUT	T33	T71

Top 10

CUT = missed the halfway cut
"T" indicates a tie for a place

== Results in World Golf Championships ==
Tournament	2002	2003
Match Play		R64
Championship	T46	T54
Invitational	T36	T30

Did not play

QF, R16, R32, R64 = Round in which player lost in match play
"T" = Tied

== U.S. national team appearances ==
Amateur

- Walker Cup: 1987 (winners)

== See also ==
- 1992 PGA Tour Qualifying School graduates
- 1995 PGA Tour Qualifying School graduates
