= 1990 PGA Tour Qualifying School graduates =

This is a list of the 49 players who earned 1991 PGA Tour cards through the PGA Tour Qualifying Tournament in 1990. The final stage was held at PGA West Stadium Course and La Quinta Hotel Golf Club Dunes Course in La Quinta, California. 182 players entered the final stage. Duffy Waldorf won the event.

Place	Player	PGA Tour starts	Cuts made	Notes
1	(United States) Duffy Waldorf	122	66	
2	(United States) John Inman	139	69	1 PGA Tour win
3	(United States) Scott Gump	3	1	
T4	(United States) Bryan Norton	4	1	
T4	(United States) Carl Cooper	24	5	
T4	(United States) Brandt Jobe	2	0	
T7	(United States) Brandel Chamblee	41	12	1 Ben Hogan Tour win
T7	(United States) Bill Buttner	142	57	
T7	(United States) Ronnie Black	252	157	2 PGA Tour wins
T10	(United States) Dillard Pruitt	63	28	
T10	(United States) Greg Whisman	0	0	
T12	(United States) Bart Bryant	2	1	
T12	(United States) Greg Bruckner	30	15	
T12	(United States) John Daly	10	5	1 Ben Hogan Tour win
T12	(United States) Karl Kimball	25	3	
T16	(United States) Ken Schall	5	1	
T16	(United States) Mike Standly	3	1	
T16	(United States) Sean Murphy	23	6	
T16	(Namibia) Trevor Dodds	87	42	1 Ben Hogan Tour win
T16	(United States) Jerry Haas	38	15	
T21	(United States) Brad Bell	1	0	1 Ben Hogan Tour win
T21	(United States) Larry Silveira	58	29	
T21	(United States) Marco Dawson	3	2	
T21	(United States) Perry Arthur	73	23	
T21	(United States) Dudley Hart	0	0	
T26	(United States) Robert Thompson	119	50	
T26	(United States) Jim Benepe	71	28	1 PGA Tour win
T26	(United States) J. C. Anderson	1	0	
T26	(United States) Clark Dennis	40	14	
T26	(United States) George Burns	422	302	4 PGA Tour wins
T26	(United States) John Wilson	0	0	
T32	(United States) Brad Lardon	0	0	
T32	(United States) Michael Allen	31	16	1 European Tour win
T32	(United States) Craig Rudolph	2	0	
T32	(United States) Brian Kamm	23	7	
T36	(United States) Mark Hayes	521	345	3 PGA Tour wins
T36	(United States) Barry Cheesman	39	8	1 Ben Hogan Tour win
T36	(United States) David Sutherland	0	0	
T36	(United States) Kim Young	30	11	1 Ben Hogan Tour win
T36	(United States) Joel Edwards	65	21	
T36	(United States) Sam Randolph	90	53	1 PGA Tour win
T36	(Canada) Dan Halldorson	307	192	1 PGA Tour win
T36	(United States) Bobby Clampett	289	181	1 PGA Tour win
T36	(United States) Brian Watts	12	7	
T45	(United States) Dicky Thompson	0	0	2 Ben Hogan Tour wins
T45	(United States) Neal Lancaster	26	11	
T45	(United States) Charlie Bowles	29	6	
T45	(United States) Dave Rummells	155	101	
T45	(United States) Greg Ladehoff	122	52	

PGA Tour rookie in 1991

== 1991 Results ==
Player	Starts	Cuts made	Best finish	Money list rank	Earnings ($)
(United States) Duffy Waldorf	29	20	T5	86	196,081
(United States) John Inman	32	17	T11	145	84,501
(United States) Scott Gump*	29	18	T2	80	207,809
(United States) Bryan Norton*	25	9	T7	173	50,139
(United States) Carl Cooper	26	9	T14	190	37,387
(United States) Brandt Jobe*	27	5	T11	189	37,502
(United States) Brandel Chamblee	30	12	T5	161	64,141
(United States) Bill Buttner	28	12	T19	183	40,373
(United States) Ronnie Black	25	14	T5	113	135,865
(United States) Dillard Pruitt	27	18	Win	63	271,861
(United States) Greg Whisman*	29	13	T14	155	67,975
(United States) Bart Bryant*	31	17	7	124	119,931
(United States) Greg Bruckner	32	17	T14	151	74,858
(United States) John Daly*	33	21	Win	17	574,783
(United States) Karl Kimball	25	9	T30	209	19,704
(United States) Ken Schall*	30	10	T11	181	41,248
(United States) Mike Standly*	31	14	T18	171	55,846
(United States) Sean Murphy	25	9	T29	203	24,187
(Namibia) Trevor Dodds	28	15	T14	169	57,786
(United States) Jerry Haas	32	17	T5	134	103,104
(United States) Brad Bell*	24	4	T23	217	16,851
(United States) Larry Silveira	29	10	1^{†}	138	93,893
(United States) Marco Dawson*	29	12	T9	137	96,756
(United States) Perry Arthur	25	11	T7	175	49,396
(United States) Dudley Hart*	31	17	T5	120	126,217
(United States) Robert Thompson	26	4	T6	182	40,895
(United States) Jim Benepe	30	8	7	164	62,083
(United States) J. C. Anderson*	26	7	T20	196	33,180
(United States) Clark Dennis	30	10	T20	170	57,720
(United States) George Burns	5	0	Cut	n/a	0
(United States) John Wilson*	29	12	T19	180	43,041
(United States) Brad Lardon*	23	8	T18	205	20,926
(United States) Michael Allen	29	15	T18	177	47,626
(United States) Craig Rudolph*	26	7	T42	219	14,765
(United States) Brian Kamm	27	11	T8	146	81,932
(United States) Mark Hayes	22	8	T21	191	36,370
(United States) Barry Cheesman	28	6	T21	200	25,156
(United States) David Sutherland*	28	11	T3	152	71,629
(United States) Kim Young	22	4	T41	231	9,022
(United States) Joel Edwards	30	13	T5	131	106,820
(United States) Sam Randolph	27	9	T6	154	68,668
(Canada) Dan Halldorson	27	17	T2	97	158,743
(United States) Bobby Clampett	30	12	T5	116	127,817
(United States) Brian Watts*	29	11	T7	184	40,199
(United States) Dicky Thompson*	31	13	T9	144	86,480
(United States) Neal Lancaster	33	22	T5	90	180,037
(United States) Charlie Bowles	26	11	T5	168	58,035
(United States) Dave Rummells	31	20	T3	79	213,627
(United States) Greg Ladehoff	26	11	T7	150	75,659

*PGA Tour rookie in 1991
T = Tied
The player retained his PGA Tour card for 1992 (finished inside the top 125, excluding non-members)
The player did not retain his PGA Tour card for 1992, but retained conditional status (finished between 126 and 150, excluding non-members)
The player did not retain his PGA Tour card for 1992 (finished outside the top 150)
^{†}Silveira won the Deposit Guaranty Golf Classic, in which money earned was official but the win was not.

== Winners on the PGA Tour in 1991 ==
No.	Date	Player	Tournament	Winning score	Margin of victory	Runner-up
1	Jul 21	(United States) Dillard Pruitt	Chattanooga Classic	−20 (66-65-65-64=260)	2 strokes	(United States) Lance Ten Broeck
2	Aug 11	(United States) John Daly	PGA Championship	−12 (69-67-69-71=276)	3 strokes	(United States) Bruce Lietzke

== Runners-up on the PGA Tour in 1991 ==
No.	Date	Player	Tournament	Winner	Winning score	Runner-up score
1	Mar 10	(Canada) Dan Halldorson	Honda Classic	(United States) Steve Pate	−9 (69-65-70-75=279)	−6 (67-67-78-70=282)
2	Aug 18	(United States) Scott Gump	The International	(Spain) José María Olazábal	10 points	7 points

== See also ==
- 1990 Ben Hogan Tour graduates
