= Billy Ray Brown =

American professional golfer (born 1963)

Personal information
- Nationality: United States
- Born: April 5, 1963 (age 63) Missouri City, Texas, U.S.
- Height: 6 ft 3 in (1.91 m)
- Weight: 205 lb (93 kg; 14.6 st)

Career
- Sport: Golf
- College: University of Houston
- Turned professional: 1987
- Former tour: PGA Tour
- Professional wins: 3
- Highest ranking: 54 (May 17, 1992)

Number of wins by tour
- PGA Tour: 3

Best results in major championships
- Masters Tournament: T19: 1992
- PGA Championship: T40: 1992
- U.S. Open: T3: 1990
- The Open Championship: CUT: 1992

William Ray Brown (born April 5, 1963) is an American former professional golfer who played on the PGA Tour in the 1980s and 1990s. He is currently a on-course reporter for Golf Channel and commentator for CBS Sports.

== Early life ==
Brown was born, raised, and still lives in Missouri City, Texas. His father, Charlie Brown, played football for the Houston Cougars football and professionally in the CFL and AFL.

== Amateur career ==
Brown attended the University of Houston and was a member of the Cougar golf team. He won the 1982 NCAA Division I Championship as a freshman. He was also a member of the 1984 and 1985 national championship teams, and was an All-American all four years.

== Professional career ==
Brown won three PGA Tour events in a career cut short by an injury and subsequent surgeries to his wrist. His best finish in a major championship was T-3 at the 1990 U.S. Open, one stroke out of the playoff. He had seventeen top-10 finishes in 315 PGA Tour events.

After his playing days ended, Brown moved into the media to serve as an on-course reporter for ABC Sports from 1999 until 2006. In 2007, Brown joined the Golf Channel as an on-course reporter for their PGA Tour and Champions Tour coverage.

== Amateur wins (1) ==
this list may be incomplete

- 1982 NCAA Championship

== Professional wins (3) ==
=== PGA Tour wins (3) ===
No.	Date	Tournament	Winning score	To par	Margin of victory	Runner(s)-up
1	Jul 28, 1991	Canon Greater Hartford Open	67-72-65-67=271	−10	Playoff	(United States) Rick Fehr, (United States) Corey Pavin
2	May 17, 1992	GTE Byron Nelson Golf Classic	69-64-66=199 (Note: Shortened to 54 holes due to weather.)	−11	Playoff	(United States) Ben Crenshaw, (United States) Raymond Floyd, (United States) Bruce Lietzke
3	Jul 20, 1997	Deposit Guaranty Golf Classic	69-66-69-67=271	−17	1 stroke	(United States) Mike Standly

PGA Tour playoff record (2–0)

No.	Year	Tournament	Opponents	Result
1	1991	Canon Greater Hartford Open	(United States) Rick Fehr, (United States) Corey Pavin	Won with birdie on first extra hole
2	1992	GTE Byron Nelson Golf Classic	(United States) Ben Crenshaw, (United States) Raymond Floyd, (United States) Bruce Lietzke	Won with birdie on first extra hole

== Results in major championships ==
Tournament	1989	1990	1991	1992	1993	1994	1995	1996	1997	1998
Masters Tournament			T42	T19	CUT					CUT
U.S. Open		T3	T19	CUT			CUT			
The Open Championship				CUT						
PGA Championship	CUT	CUT	T73	T40					CUT	

Top 10
Did not play

CUT = missed the half-way cut
"T" = tied

== See also ==
- 1987 PGA Tour Qualifying School graduates
- 1995 PGA Tour Qualifying School graduates
- 1996 PGA Tour Qualifying School graduates
