= Mike Standly =

American golfer

Personal information
- Full name: Michael Dean Standly
- Nationality: United States
- Born: May 19, 1964 (age 62) Abilene, Texas, U.S.
- Height: 6 ft 0 in (1.83 m)
- Weight: 200 lb (91 kg; 14 st)

Career
- Sport: Golf
- College: University of Houston
- Turned professional: 1986
- Former tour: PGA Tour
- Professional wins: 1

Number of wins by tour
- PGA Tour: 1
- Other: 1

Best results in major championships
- Masters Tournament: T41: 1994
- PGA Championship: T61: 1993
- U.S. Open: T16: 1993
- The Open Championship: DNP

Michael Dean Standly (born May 19, 1964) is an American professional golfer who has played on the PGA Tour and the Nationwide Tour.

== Early life and amateur career ==
Standly was born in Abilene, Texas. He attended the University of Houston and was a member of the golf team; he was an All-American in 1986, his senior year.

== Professional career ==
Standly turned pro in 1986. Standly played the Ben Hogan Tour, now Nationwide Tour, in 1990. He earned his PGA Tour card for 1991 by finishing T-16 at qualifying school. He played on the PGA Tour from 1991 to 1999. From 2000 to 2008, he split his gradually decreasing playing time between the PGA Tour and Nationwide Tour.

Standly has 35 top-25 finishes in his PGA Tour career including 12 top-10 finishes. He is able to boast three top-5 finishes in one particular tournament: the Freeport-McMoRan Golf Classic. He had a T-2 there in 1992, a win in 1993, and a T-5 in 1995. Standly finished second at the 1997 Deposit Guaranty Golf Classic when Billy Ray Brown birdied the final hole to win by one stroke. His best finish in a major championship is T-16 at the 1993 U.S. Open.

Standly's best finish on the Nationwide Tour is T-3 at the 2003 Alberta Calgary Classic.

== Personal life ==
Standly lives in Houston, Texas.

== Professional wins (1) ==
=== PGA Tour wins (1) ===
No.	Date	Tournament	Winning score	Margin of victory	Runners-up
1	Apr 4, 1993	Freeport-McMoRan Golf Classic	−7 (71-71-72-67=281)	1 stroke	(United States) Russ Cochran, (United States) Payne Stewart

== Results in major championships ==
Tournament	1993	1994	1995	1996	1997
Masters Tournament	CUT	T41			
U.S. Open	T16		CUT		
PGA Championship	T61				CUT

Note: Standly never played in The Open Championship.

Did not play

CUT = missed the half-way cut
"T" = tied

== See also ==
- 1990 PGA Tour Qualifying School graduates
- 1991 PGA Tour Qualifying School graduates
- 1996 PGA Tour Qualifying School graduates
