= J. P. Hayes =

American professional golfer (born 1965)

Personal information
- Full name: John Patrick Hayes
- Nationality: United States
- Born: August 2, 1965 (age 61) Appleton, Wisconsin, U.S.
- Height: 6 ft 0 in (1.83 m)
- Weight: 185 lb (84 kg; 13.2 st)

Career
- Sport: Golf
- College: UTEP
- Turned professional: 1989
- Current tour: PGA Tour
- Professional wins: 3
- Highest ranking: 89 (March 12, 2000)

Number of wins by tour
- PGA Tour: 2
- Korn Ferry Tour: 1

Best results in major championships
- Masters Tournament: CUT: 1999
- PGA Championship: T19: 2000
- U.S. Open: T64: 2003
- The Open Championship: T42: 2001

John Patrick "J.P." Hayes (born August 2, 1965) is an American professional golfer.

== Early life ==
Hayes was born and raised in Appleton, Wisconsin. He attended the University of Texas at El Paso, where he was a member of the golf team. He majored in marketing and graduated in 1988. In 1989, he turned professional.

== Career ==
Hayes began play on the PGA Tour in 1992 after earning his tour card at qualifying school (Q school). He failed to finish high enough on the money list to retain his card and played on the Nike Tour (now Web.com Tour) in 1993 and 1994. He again gained a PGA Tour card for the 1995 season through Q school but failed to keep it. Playing the Nike Tour again in 1996, he won the Nike Miami Valley Open and finished 14th on the money list. He finished 13th at Q school to earn his 1997 PGA Tour card. He has played that tour ever since, returning to Q school in 1997 and 2004.

Hayes has won twice on the PGA Tour: the 1998 Buick Classic and the 2002 John Deere Classic.

Hayes disqualified himself in a Q-school qualifying event in November 2008 for mistakenly using a non-regulation ball for two strokes. Though golfers routinely turn themselves in for infractions, Hayes confession inexplicably became headline news. He still managed to make 15 starts in 2009 through past champion status and sponsor invites. He returned to the PGA Tour in 2010 after finishing tied for 8th in the 2009 Q school. He retained his tour card after finishing 113th on the Tour.

A knee injury and wrist surgery halted Hayes' career in 2012. He was a motivational speaker for the Cedarburg High School boys' golf team that won the 2013 Wisconsin Division I state title, led by a high school teammate of Hayes. Hayes planned to return to competitive golf in 2014 to prepare for the Champions Tour. Hayes has not played a PGA Tour-sanctioned event since 2012.

== Professional wins (3) ==
=== PGA Tour wins (2) ===
| No. | Date | Tournament | Winning score | Margin of victory | Runner-up |
|---|---|---|---|---|---|
| 1 | Jun 14, 1998 | Buick Classic | −12 (66-67-68=201) (Note: Shortened to 54 holes due to weather) | Playoff | (United States) Jim Furyk |
| 2 | Jul 28, 2002 | John Deere Classic | −22 (67-61-67-67=262) | 4 strokes | (United States) Robert Gamez |

PGA Tour playoff record (1–0)

| No. | Year | Tournament | Opponent | Result |
|---|---|---|---|---|
| 1 | 1998 | Buick Classic | (United States) Jim Furyk | Won with birdie on first extra hole |

=== Nike Tour wins (1) ===
| No. | Date | Tournament | Winning score | Margin of victory | Runners-up |
|---|---|---|---|---|---|
| 1 | Jul 28, 1996 | Nike Miami Valley Open | −19 (64-69-67-65=265) | 2 strokes | (United States) Lee Porter, (United States) Greg Whisman |

== Results in major championships ==
| Tournament | 1992 | 1993 | 1994 | 1995 | 1996 | 1997 | 1998 | 1999 |
|---|---|---|---|---|---|---|---|---|
| Masters Tournament | | | | | | | | CUT |
| U.S. Open | CUT | | | | | | | |
| The Open Championship | | | | | | | CUT | |
| PGA Championship | | | | | | | CUT | T54 |

| Tournament | 2000 | 2001 | 2002 | 2003 | 2004 | 2005 | 2006 | 2007 | 2008 | 2009 |
|---|---|---|---|---|---|---|---|---|---|---|
| Masters Tournament | | | | | | | | | | |
| U.S. Open | CUT | | | T64 | CUT | T71 | | | | CUT |
| The Open Championship | | T42 | | | | | | | | |
| PGA Championship | T19 | | T64 | | | | | | | |

Did not play

CUT = missed the half-way cut
"T" = tied

== Results in The Players Championship ==
| Tournament | 1999 | 2000 | 2001 | 2002 | 2003 | 2004 | 2005 | 2006 | 2007 | 2008 | 2009 | 2010 | 2011 |
|---|---|---|---|---|---|---|---|---|---|---|---|---|---|
| The Players Championship | CUT | T42 | T21 | CUT | CUT | T22 | | | T6 | CUT | | CUT | CUT |

Top 10
Did not play

CUT = missed the halfway cut
"T" indicates a tie for a place

== See also ==
- 1991 PGA Tour Qualifying School graduates
- 1994 PGA Tour Qualifying School graduates
- 1996 PGA Tour Qualifying School graduates
- 1997 PGA Tour Qualifying School graduates
- 2004 PGA Tour Qualifying School graduates
- 2009 PGA Tour Qualifying School graduates
