= Rick Fehr =

American professional golfer (born 1962)

Personal information
- Full name: Richard Elliott Fehr
- Nationality: United States
- Born: August 28, 1962 (age 64) Seattle, Washington, U.S.
- Height: 5 ft 11 in (1.80 m)
- Weight: 180 lb (82 kg; 13 st)

Career
- Sport: Golf
- College: Brigham Young University
- Turned professional: 1984
- Former tour: PGA Tour
- Professional wins: 3
- Highest ranking: 45 (January 15, 1995)

Number of wins by tour
- PGA Tour: 2
- Other: 1

Best results in major championships
- Masters Tournament: T25: 1984
- PGA Championship: T18: 1992
- U.S. Open: T9: 1985
- The Open Championship: DNP

Richard Elliott Fehr (born August 28, 1962) is an American former professional golfer. He played on the PGA Tour and the Nationwide Tour.

== Early life ==
Fehr was born in Seattle, Washington and grew up in the state of Washington. As a teenager, Fehr won the Washington State Junior and PGA National Junior tournaments in 1979.

== Amateur career ==
Fehr attended Brigham Young University in Provo, Utah and was a member of the golf team. He was a two-time All-American while at BYU and won numerous amateur tournaments, including the 1982 Western Amateur. He was the low amateur at both the Masters Tournament and the U.S. Open in 1984.

In 1984, Fehr graduated from college with a degree in finance.

== Professional career ==
In 1984, Fehr turned professional. He joined the PGA Tour after successfully negotiating 1985 PGA Tour Qualifying School.

Fehr won two PGA Tour events: the 1986 B.C. Open and the 1994 Walt Disney World/Oldsmobile Classic. He finished runner-up in a PGA Tour event (2nd or T-2) nine times and had 41 top-10 finishes. His best finish in a major championship was a T-9 at the 1985 U.S. Open.

Fehr now earns his living as a golf instructor/coach at The Golf Club at Newcastle near Bellevue, Washington. He is the owner of Rick Fehr Coaching.

== Amateur wins ==
- 1979 Junior PGA Championship
- 1981 Pacific Northwest Amateur
- 1982 Western Amateur

== Professional wins (3) ==
=== PGA Tour wins (2) ===
No.	Date	Tournament	Winning score	Margin of victory	Runner(s)-up
1	Sep 7, 1986	B.C. Open	−17 (65-66-67-69=267)	2 strokes	(United States) Larry Mize
2	Oct 9, 1994	Walt Disney World/Oldsmobile Classic	−19 (63-70-68-68=269)	2 strokes	(United States) Craig Stadler, (United States) Fuzzy Zoeller

PGA Tour playoff record (0–4)

No.	Year	Tournament	Opponent(s)	Result
1	1991	Canon Greater Hartford Open	(United States) Billy Ray Brown, (United States) Corey Pavin	Brown won with birdie on first extra hole
2	1992	Bob Hope Chrysler Classic	(United States) John Cook, (United States) Tom Kite (United States) Mark O'Meara, (United States) Gene Sauers	Cook won with eagle on fourth extra hole Fehr eliminated by birdie on second hole Kite and O'Meara eliminated by birdie on first hole
3	1992	Memorial Tournament	(United States) David Edwards	Lost to par on second extra hole
4	1994	Sprint International	(United States) Steve Lowery	Lost to par on first extra hole

=== Other wins (1) ===
- 1994 Northwest Open

== Results in major championships ==
Tournament	1983	1984	1985	1986	1987	1988	1989
Masters Tournament	CUT	T25 LA		T36	CUT		
U.S. Open		T43 LA	T9	T62			
PGA Championship					CUT		

Tournament	1990	1991	1992	1993	1994	1995	1996	1997
Masters Tournament					CUT	47		
U.S. Open		T26	CUT	T46	CUT	CUT		
PGA Championship	CUT	T27	T18	T56	CUT			CUT

Note: Fehr never played in The Open Championship.

Top 10
Did not play

LA = low amateur
CUT = missed the half-way cut
"T" = tied

=== Summary ===
Tournament	Wins	2nd	3rd	Top-5	Top-10	Top-25	Events	Cuts made
Masters Tournament	0	0	0	0	0	1	6	3
U.S. Open	0	0	0	0	1	1	8	5
The Open Championship	0	0	0	0	0	0	0	0
PGA Championship	0	0	0	0	0	1	7	3
Totals	0	0	0	0	1	3	21	11

- Most consecutive cuts made – 5 (1984 Masters – 1986 U.S. Open)
- Longest streak of top-10s – 1

== Team appearances ==
Amateur

- Walker Cup: 1983 (winners)

== See also ==
- 1985 PGA Tour Qualifying School graduates
- 1989 PGA Tour Qualifying School graduates
- 1998 PGA Tour Qualifying School graduates
- 1999 PGA Tour Qualifying School graduates
