= Scott Gump =

American professional golfer (born 1965)

Personal information
- Nationality: United States
- Born: December 17, 1965 (age 60) Merritt Island, Florida, U.S.
- Height: 6 ft 2 in (1.88 m)
- Weight: 185 lb (84 kg; 13.2 st)

Career
- Sport: Golf
- College: University of Miami
- Turned professional: 1988
- Former tours: PGA Tour; Nationwide Tour; U.S. Golf Tour
- Professional wins: 6
- Highest ranking: 98 (May 23, 1999)

Number of wins by tour
- Korn Ferry Tour: 3
- Other: 3

Best results in major championships
- Masters Tournament: T46: 2000
- PGA Championship: T23: 1998
- U.S. Open: T51: 1992
- The Open Championship: CUT: 1999

Scott Gump (born December 17, 1965) is an American former professional golfer.

== Career ==
Gump was born in Merritt Island, Florida. He has had three Nationwide Tour victories and has finished runner-up three times in PGA Tour tournaments, including The Players Championship in 1999. He also competed on mini-tours in the United States, winning several tournaments.

== Professional wins (6) ==
=== Nationwide Tour wins (3) ===
No.	Date	Tournament	Winning score	Margin of victory	Runner(s)-up
1	Mar 6, 1994	Nike Monterrey Open	−19 (67-67-68-67=269)	1 stroke	(United States) Brian Henninger
2	May 29, 1994	Nike Greater Greenville Classic	−16 (71-67-66-68=272)	1 stroke	(United States) Tim Conley
3	Sep 26, 2004	Albertsons Boise Open	−14 (66-68-68-68=270)	2 strokes	(New Zealand) Michael Long, (United States) Jimmy Walker

Nationwide Tour playoff record (0–1)

No.	Year	Tournament	Opponents	Result
1	1994	Nike Cleveland Open	(United States) Tommy Armour III, (United States) Tom Scherrer	Armour won with birdie on first extra hole

=== U.S. Golf Tour wins (1) ===
- 1989 Mobile Tournament

=== Space Coast Tour wins (2) ===
- 1988 Hunter's Creek
- 1989 Walden Lake

== Results in major championships ==
Tournament	1988	1989	1990	1991	1992	1993	1994	1995	1996	1997	1998	1999	2000
Masters Tournament	CUT												T46
U.S. Open				CUT	T51				CUT			CUT	CUT
The Open Championship												CUT	
PGA Championship					T79						T23	CUT	

Did not play

CUT = missed the half-way cut
"T" indicates a tie for a place

== Results in The Players Championship ==
Tournament	1992	1993	1994	1995	1996	1997	1998	1999	2000
The Players Championship	66	CUT			T19	T65	T54	2	T42

Top 10
Did not play

CUT = missed the halfway cut
"T" indicates a tie for a place

== See also ==
- 1990 PGA Tour Qualifying School graduates
- 1994 Nike Tour graduates
