= Brent Geiberger =

American professional golfer (born 1968)

Personal information
- Full name: Brent Andrew Geiberger
- Nationality: United States
- Born: May 22, 1968 (age 58) Santa Barbara, California, U.S.
- Height: 6 ft 4 in (1.93 m)
- Weight: 200 lb (91 kg; 14 st)

Career
- Sport: Golf
- College: College of the Desert; Pepperdine University
- Turned professional: 1993
- Former tour: PGA Tour
- Professional wins: 2
- Highest ranking: 37 (July 2, 2000)

Number of wins by tour
- PGA Tour: 2

Best results in major championships
- Masters Tournament: CUT: 2000
- PGA Championship: T71: 1998
- U.S. Open: CUT: 1998, 2002
- The Open Championship: DNP

Brent Andrew Geiberger (born May 22, 1968) is an American professional golfer who played on the PGA Tour. He is the son of golfer Al Geiberger.

== Early life and amateur career ==
In 1968, Geiberger was born in Santa Barbara, California. He attended College of the Desert in Palm Desert, California, winning eight junior college tournaments. He also attended Pepperdine University in Malibu, California and was a member of the golf team.

His brother, John, is coach of the Pepperdine University golf team that won the 1997 NCAA Division I Golf Championship.

== Professional career ==
In 1993, Geiberger turned professional. He initially played on the Nike Tour. Geiberger has won two PGA Tour events. His first win came in 1999 at the Canon Greater Hartford Open, and his second was at the 2004 Chrysler Classic of Greensboro. He has featured in the top 50 of the Official World Golf Ranking.

In 1998, Geiberger and his father made history when they became the first father-son combination to compete in the PGA Championship.

Geiberger hit the first shot at the first PGA Tour event played in Mexico, the 2008 OHL Classic at Mayakoba.

Geiberger has not played a PGA Tour event since withdrawing from the 2009 Wyndham Championship.

== Professional wins (2) ==
=== PGA Tour wins (2) ===
No.	Date	Tournament	Winning score	Margin of victory	Runner-up
1	Aug 1, 1999	Canon Greater Hartford Open	−18 (66-63-66-67=262)	3 strokes	(United States) Skip Kendall
2	Oct 17, 2004	Chrysler Classic of Greensboro	−18 (66-67-71-66=270)	2 strokes	(United States) Michael Allen

== Results in major championships ==
Tournament	1998	1999	2000	2001	2002	2003	2004	2005
Masters Tournament			CUT					
U.S. Open	CUT		CUT		CUT			
PGA Championship	T71	CUT	CUT					CUT

Note: Geiberger never played in The Open Championship.

Did not play

CUT = missed the half-way cut
"T" = tied

== Results in The Players Championship ==
Tournament	1998	1999	2000	2001	2002	2003	2004	2005
The Players Championship	CUT	T46	CUT	T70	CUT	CUT	WD	WD

CUT = missed the halfway cut
WD = withdrew
"T" indicates a tie for a place

== Results in World Golf Championships ==
Tournament	1999	2000	2001	2002	2003	2004	2005
Match Play		R64	R64				
Championship	T55		NT^{1}				
Invitational							T46

^{1}Cancelled due to 9/11

Did not play

QF, R16, R32, R64 = Round in which player lost in match play
"T" = Tied
NT = No tournament

== See also ==
- 1996 PGA Tour Qualifying School graduates
