= Phil Tataurangi =

New Zealand golfer

Personal information
- Full name: Phillip Mikaera Tataurangi
- Nationality: New Zealand
- Born: 31 October 1971 (age 55) Auckland, New Zealand
- Height: 5 ft 10 in (1.78 m)
- Weight: 175 lb (79 kg; 12.5 st)

Career
- Sport: Golf
- Turned professional: 1993
- Former tours: PGA Tour; PGA Tour of Australasia; Nike Tour
- Professional wins: 3
- Highest ranking: 64 (9 February 2003)

Number of wins by tour
- PGA Tour: 1
- PGA Tour of Australasia: 1
- Korn Ferry Tour: 1

Best results in major championships
- Masters Tournament: T39: 2003
- PGA Championship: T61: 2003
- U.S. Open: CUT: 1998, 2002, 2006
- The Open Championship: DNP

Phillip Mikaera Tataurangi (born 31 October 1971) is a New Zealand golfer.

== Career ==
Tataurangi was born in Auckland. In 1992 he was a member of the New Zealand's winning Eisenhower Trophy team and was the leading individual player in the tournament. He turned professional in 1993 and has played mainly in the United States as a pro. The highlights of his professional career include winning the 1996 Australian PGA Championship and the 2002 Invensys Classic on the PGA Tour.

== Amateur wins ==
- 1992 New South Wales Medal
- 1993 New Zealand Amateur

== Professional wins (3) ==
=== PGA Tour wins (1) ===
No.	Date	Tournament	Winning score	To par	Margin of victory	Runners-up
1	13 Oct 2002	Invensys Classic at Las Vegas	67-66-67-68-62=330	−29	1 stroke	(Australia) Stuart Appleby, (United States) Jeff Sluman

=== PGA Tour of Australasia wins (1) ===
No.	Date	Tournament	Winning score	To par	Margin of victory	Runners-up
1	17 Nov 1996	MasterCard Australian PGA Championship	71-72-69-67=279	−9	1 stroke	(Australia) Rodger Davis, (Australia) Peter Lonard

=== Nike Tour wins (1) ===
No.	Date	Tournament	Winning score	To par	Margin of victory	Runner-up
1	29 Sep 1996	Nike Tri-Cities Open	69-67-65-66=267	−21	6 strokes	(United States) Skip Kendall

== Results in major championships ==
Tournament	1998	1999	2000	2001	2002	2003	2004	2005	2006
Masters Tournament						T39			
U.S. Open	CUT				CUT				CUT
PGA Championship						T61			

Note: Tataurangi never played in The Open Championship.

Did not play

CUT = missed the half-way cut
"T" = tied

== Results in The Players Championship ==
Tournament	1998	1999	2000	2001	2002	2003
The Players Championship	CUT	CUT				CUT

Did not play

CUT = missed the halfway cut

== Results in World Golf Championships ==
Tournament	2003
Match Play	R32
Championship	
Invitational	

Did not play

QF, R16, R32, R64 = Round in which player lost in match play

== Team appearances ==
Amateur

- Eisenhower Trophy (representing New Zealand): 1988, 1992 (team winners and individual leader)
- Nomura Cup (representing New Zealand): 1989, 1993

Professional

- World Cup (representing New Zealand): 1996

== See also ==
- 1993 PGA Tour Qualifying School graduates
- 1996 PGA Tour Qualifying School graduates
- 2001 PGA Tour Qualifying School graduates

Awards
Preceded by Danyon Loader	New Zealand's Sportsman of the Year; 1993	Succeeded by Danyon Loader
