= David Sutherland (golfer) =

American golfer (born 1966)

Personal information
- Full name: David Allan Sutherland
- Nationality: United States
- Born: February 20, 1966 (age 60) Roseville, California, U.S.
- Height: 6 ft 1 in (1.85 m)
- Weight: 185 lb (84 kg; 13.2 st)

Career
- Sport: Golf
- College: Fresno State
- Turned professional: 1989
- Former tour: PGA Tour
- Professional wins: 2

Number of wins by tour
- Korn Ferry Tour: 1

David Allan Sutherland (born February 20, 1966) is an American professional golfer.

== Early life and amateur career ==
In 1966, Sutherland was born in Roseville, California. His older brother is Kevin Sutherland, a future professional golfer. Following Kevin's footsteps, Sutherland attended Fresno State. He earned All-American honors there.

In 1989, he won the Western Amateur, one of the top amateur events in the country.

== Professional career ==
In 1989, Sutherland turned pro. In 1991, he played on the PGA Tour after finishing T36 at qualifying school. He failed to earn enough money (finished 152nd on the money list) to retain his tour card. He played on the Nationwide Tour in 1992 and 1993.

Sutherland was successful at 1996 PGA Tour Qualifying School, finishing 17th at qualifying school. He played on the tour through 2004. In early 2001, he suffered a torn labrum in his left shoulder that required surgery. He chose to return to play at the Buy.com Utah Classic in September and won the tournament. He failed to win enough money on the PGA Tour in 2002, playing on a medical exemption, to retain his card for 2003. However, he finished T11 in qualifying school and played 2003 and 2004 on the PGA Tour. He was demoted to the Nationwide Tour in 2006.

In 2007, he retired as a touring professional. Later in the year, Sutherland became director of golf at Sacramento State.

== Amateur wins ==
- 1989 Western Amateur

== Professional wins (2) ==
=== Buy.com Tour wins (1) ===
No.	Date	Tournament	Winning score	Margin of victory	Runner-up
1	Sep 2, 2001	Buy.com Utah Classic	−16 (63-64-73-72=272)	1 stroke	(United States) Danny Briggs

=== Other wins (1) ===
- 1990 Northern California Open

== See also ==
- 1990 PGA Tour Qualifying School graduates
- 1996 PGA Tour Qualifying School graduates
- 2002 PGA Tour Qualifying School graduates
