= Brandel Chamblee =

American professional golfer (born 1962)

Personal information
- Full name: Brandel Eugene Chamblee
- Nationality: United States
- Born: July 2, 1962 (age 64) St. Louis, Missouri, U.S.
- Height: 5 ft 10 in (1.78 m)
- Weight: 155 lb (70 kg; 11.1 st)

Career
- Sport: Golf
- College: University of Texas
- Turned professional: 1985
- Current tour: PGA Tour Champions
- Former tour: PGA Tour
- Professional wins: 4
- Highest ranking: 58 (May 16, 1999)

Number of wins by tour
- PGA Tour: 1
- Korn Ferry Tour: 1
- Other: 2

Best results in major championships
- Masters Tournament: T18: 1999
- PGA Championship: CUT: 1995, 1996, 1997, 1999
- U.S. Open: T44: 2001
- The Open Championship: T62: 2001

Brandel Eugene Chamblee (born July 2, 1962) is an American former professional golfer, commentator and writer.

== Early life and amateur career ==
Chamblee was born in St. Louis, Missouri. He graduated from the University of Texas with a degree in Speech Communication and was a first-team All-American in his junior year and twice a second-team All-American.

== Professional career ==
Chamblee turned professional in 1985 and has one PGA Tour victory. He shared a first round lead at the 1999 Masters Tournament and for seven consecutive years (1995–2001) was among the top-100 for money earnings on the Tour.

Chamblee lost his PGA Tour card in 2003, and since then has worked as the lead studio analyst for the Golf Channel, Golf Central and for its "Live From" coverage of major championships.

In 2018, Chamblee returned to professional golf on the PGA Tour Champions. In 2023, after the news broke that Saudi Arabia's Public Investment Fund would become a minority investor in The PGA Tour, Chamblee has promoted his view that the Department Of Justice will block the deal.

== Personal life ==
Chamblee lives in Phoenix, Arizona. He has four children with his ex-wife Karen: sons Brandel Jr., Brennen, Braeden, and a daughter, Bergen. A memorial playground was set up at the Phoenix Children's Hospital for a son, Braeden, who died as an infant.

He is now married to Bailey (Mosier) Chamblee, who is also a television personality.

== Awards and honors ==
Chamblee was inducted into the Irving Independent School District Hall of Fame Class of 2014. Chamblee was inducted into the University of Texas Hall of Fame (Hall of Honor) in 2008

== Amateur wins ==
- 1983 Rice Planters Amateur

== Professional wins (4) ==
=== PGA Tour wins (1) ===
No.	Date	Tournament	Winning score	Margin of victory	Runner-up
1	Aug 30, 1998	Greater Vancouver Open	−19 (67-64-68-66=265)	3 strokes	(United States) Payne Stewart

PGA Tour playoff record (0–2)

No.	Year	Tournament	Opponent(s)	Result
1	1996	BellSouth Classic	(United States) Paul Stankowski	Lost to par on first extra hole
2	2001	Nissan Open	(Australia) Robert Allenby, (Japan) Toshimitsu Izawa, (United States) Dennis Paulson, (United States) Jeff Sluman, (United States) Bob Tway	Allenby won with birdie on first extra hole

=== Ben Hogan Tour wins (1) ===
No.	Date	Tournament	Winning score	Margin of victory	Runner-up
1	Jul 5, 1990	Ben Hogan New England Classic	−1 (68-78-69=215)	1 stroke	(United States) Jeff Maggert

=== Other wins (2) ===
- 1986 TPA Tucson Open
- 1994 Abierto International Open (Chile)

== Results in major championships ==
Tournament	1987	1988	1989	1990	1991	1992	1993	1994	1995	1996	1997	1998	1999	2000	2001
Masters Tournament													T18		
U.S. Open	CUT					CUT						CUT	T46	T61	T44
The Open Championship	T66								CUT						T62
PGA Championship									CUT	CUT	CUT		CUT		

Did not play

CUT = missed the half-way cut
"T" = tied

== See also ==
- 1987 PGA Tour Qualifying School graduates
- 1990 PGA Tour Qualifying School graduates
- 1991 PGA Tour Qualifying School graduates
- 1992 PGA Tour Qualifying School graduates
