= Justin Leonard =

American professional golfer (born 1972)

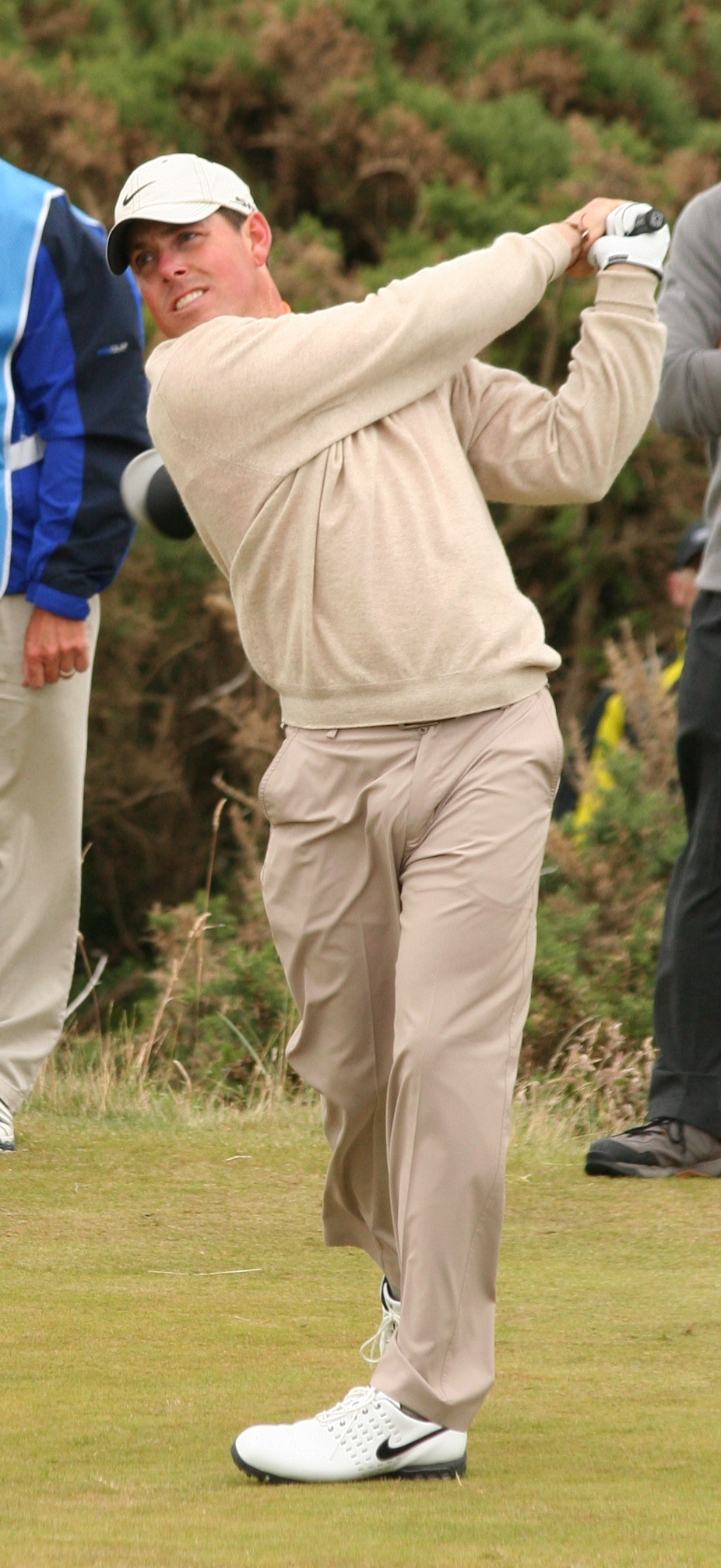
- Leonard in 2008

Personal information
- Full name: Justin Charles; Garrett Leonard
- Nationality: United States
- Born: June 15, 1972 (age 54) Dallas, Texas, U.S.
- Height: 5 ft 9 in (1.75 m)
- Weight: 170 lb (77 kg; 12 st)
- Spouse: Amanda
- Children: 4

Career
- Sport: Golf
- College: University of Texas
- Turned professional: 1994
- Current tour: PGA Tour Champions
- Former tour: PGA Tour
- Professional wins: 15
- Highest ranking: 6 (May 10, 1998)

Number of wins by tour
- PGA Tour: 12
- European Tour: 1
- PGA Tour Champions: 2
- Other: 1

Best results in major championships (wins: 1)
- Masters Tournament: T7: 1997
- PGA Championship: 2nd/T2: 1997, 2004
- U.S. Open: T12: 2002
- The Open Championship: Won: 1997

Achievements and awards
- Haskins Award: 1994

Justin Charles Garrett Leonard (born June 15, 1972) is an American professional golfer. He has 12 career wins on the PGA Tour, including one major, the 1997 Open Championship. He currently plays on the PGA Tour Champions. He is one of only five players to win the U.S. Amateur, the NCAA Individual Championship, and a major golf tournament.

== Early life ==
Leonard was born and raised in Dallas, Texas. He graduated from Lake Highlands High School in 1990.

== Amateur career ==
Leonard attended the University of Texas in Austin. With the Longhorns he won 4-straight Southwest Conference Championships (1991-1994) and went to 4 straight NCAA Championships, with the team finishing in 2nd place in 1994. He won 10 individual events in college, including the individual NCAA championship in 1994 and the Southwest Conference Championship a record 4 times (1991-1994). He won the 1992 U.S. Amateur. He made the All-Southwest Conference team every year he was in college and was a three-time 1st team All-American (1992, 1993, 1994) - and a 2nd team All-American in 1991. He won the Haskins Award and Jack Nicklaus Award in 1994 as the most outstanding collegiate golfer. That same year, he became only the fourth player to go directly from college to the PGA Tour without going through Q School, following Gary Hallberg, Scott Verplank, and Phil Mickelson.

== Professional career ==
Leonard's wins on the PGA Tour included one of golf's four majors, the 1997 Open Championship, as well as the 1998 Players Championship. He ranked in the top 10 of the Official World Golf Ranking for 24 weeks in 1998 and 1999. Leonard also had opportunities to win other major championships, notably at the 1999 Open Championship and the 2004 PGA Championship; in both instances he fell into a playoff with a bogey on the 72nd hole.

At the 1997 PGA Championship, Leonard was tied with Davis Love III for the 54-hole lead. Love shot a final round 66 to win by five shots over Leonard, who finished solo second. Leonard was ahead by three shots at the 54-hole mark of the 2002 PGA Championship before shooting a final round 77 and finishing tied for fourth.

Leonard qualified for the United States Ryder Cup team in 1997, 1999, and 2008. In the 1999 event, Leonard made a 45-foot (14 m) putt for birdie on the 17th hole to complete a remarkable comeback by the U.S. team on the final day. The victory was somewhat marred by the celebration following Leonard's putt, when other U.S. players, their wives, and a few fans ran onto the green even though Leonard's opponent, José María Olazábal, still had an opportunity to match Leonard on the hole.

=== Broadcasting career ===
In 2015, Leonard moved to Aspen, Colorado, which is not conducive to the year-round practice of golf and began to transition to a career as a golf announcer. Leonard joined Golf Channel in 2015 as an analyst for Golf Central "Live From" and PGA Tour live tournament coverage.

After using his career money list exemption for the 2015–16 season and failing to make the FedEx Cup, Leonard played the 2016–17 season with past champion status. He played in only 16 tournaments that year, his best finish being a tie for 16th at the Northern Trust Open. In 2017, he played in only one tournament, the Texas Open, where he finished in 58th.

In 2020, he assumed an elevated role on Golf Central "Live From" as an analyst on the program's primetime shows.

He returned to the PGA for one event in 2022, competing in the Byron Nelson where he failed to make the cut. It was his last event before turning 50 and qualifying for the PGA Tour Champions.

Leonard made his PGA Tour Champions debut at the 2022 Senior Players Championship where he finished in 61st place.

In 2023, his first full season on the tour, he carded a course record score of 62 in the first round of the American Family Insurance Championship at University Ridge Golf Course in Madison, Wisconsin and finished tied for 4th, his best finish since 2014. Later that season he finished in a tie for 1st at the PURE Insurance Championship, but lost the playoff to Thongchai Jaidee on the 4th sudden-death hole. It was his best finish since winning the 2008 St. Jude Open. In February 2025, he won his first senior event, the Chubb Classic.

== Amateur wins ==
- 1992 Western Amateur, Southern Amateur, U.S. Amateur
- 1993 Western Amateur, Southern Amateur
- 1994 NCAA Division I Championship

== Professional wins (15) ==
=== PGA Tour wins (12) ===
Legend
Major championships (1)
Players Championships (1)
Other PGA Tour (10)

No.	Date	Tournament	Winning score	To par	Margin of victory	Runner(s)-up
1	Aug 4, 1996	Buick Open	65-64-69-68=266	−22	5 strokes	(United States) Chip Beck
2	Jun 8, 1997	Kemper Open	69-69-69-67=274	−10	1 stroke	(United States) Mark Wiebe
3	Jul 20, 1997	The Open Championship	69-66-72-65=272	−12	3 strokes	(Northern Ireland) Darren Clarke, (Sweden) Jesper Parnevik
4	Mar 29, 1998	The Players Championship	72-69-70-67=278	−10	2 strokes	(United States) Glen Day, (United States) Tom Lehman
5	Sep 24, 2000	Westin Texas Open	64-68-65-64=261	−19	5 strokes	(United States) Mark Wiebe
6	Sep 30, 2001	Texas Open (2)	65-64-68-69=266	−18	2 strokes	(United States) J. J. Henry, (United States) Matt Kuchar
7	Apr 21, 2002	WorldCom Classic - The Heritage of Golf	67-64-66-73=270	−14	1 stroke	(United States) Heath Slocum
8	Mar 16, 2003	The Honda Classic	63-70-64-67=264	−24	1 stroke	(United States) Chad Campbell, (United States) Davis Love III
9	Jan 30, 2005	Bob Hope Chrysler Classic	66-67-68-64-67=332	−28	3 strokes	(South Africa) Tim Clark, (United States) Joe Ogilvie
10	May 29, 2005	FedEx St. Jude Classic	62-65-66-73=266	−14	1 stroke	(United States) David Toms
11	Oct 7, 2007	Valero Texas Open (3)	65-67-64-65=261	−19	Playoff	(Sweden) Jesper Parnevik
12	Jun 8, 2008	Stanford St. Jude Championship (2)	68-73-67-68=276	−4	Playoff	(Australia) Robert Allenby, (South Africa) Trevor Immelman

PGA Tour playoff record (2–5)

No.	Year	Tournament	Opponent(s)	Result
1	1996	Phoenix Open	(United States) Phil Mickelson	Lost to birdie on third extra hole
2	1999	The Open Championship	(Scotland) Paul Lawrie, (France) Jean van de Velde	Lawrie won four-hole aggregate playoff; Lawrie: E (5-4-3-3=15), Leonard: +3 (5-4-4-5=18), van de Velde: +3 (6-4-3-5=18)
3	2002	Bell Canadian Open	(United States) Neal Lancaster, (United States) John Rollins	Rollins won with birdie on first extra hole
4	2004	PGA Championship	(United States) Chris DiMarco, (Fiji) Vijay Singh	Singh won three-hole aggregate playoff; Singh: −1 (3-3-4=10), DiMarco: x (4-3-x=x), Leonard: x (4-3-x=x)
5	2007	Valero Texas Open	(Sweden) Jesper Parnevik	Won with birdie on third extra hole
6	2008	Stanford St. Jude Championship	(Australia) Robert Allenby, (South Africa) Trevor Immelman	Won with birdie on second extra hole
7	2009	Children's Miracle Network Classic	(Canada) Stephen Ames, (United States) George McNeill	Ames won with par on second extra hole Leonard eliminated by par on first hole

=== Other wins (1) ===
No.	Date	Tournament	Winning score	To par	Margin of victory	Runners-up
1	Jul 11, 2000	CVS Charity Classic (with (United States) Davis Love III)	60-66=126	−16	3 strokes	(Australia) Steve Elkington and (United States) Craig Stadler

Other playoff record (0–1)

No.	Year	Tournament	Opponents	Result
1	2006	Merrill Lynch Shootout (with (United States) Scott Verplank)	(United States) Jerry Kelly and (Australia) Rod Pampling	Lost to bogey on first extra hole

=== PGA Tour Champions wins (2) ===
Legend
Charles Schwab Cup playoff events (1)
Other PGA Tour Champions (1)

No.	Date	Tournament	Winning score	To par	Margin of victory	Runner(s)-up
1	Feb 16, 2025	Chubb Classic	68-65-68=201	−15	4 strokes	(United States) Billy Andrade
2	Oct 19, 2025	Dominion Energy Charity Classic	66-70-68=204	−12	1 stroke	(Denmark) Thomas Bjørn, (South Africa) Ernie Els

PGA Tour Champions playoff record (0–1)

No.	Year	Tournament	Opponent	Result
1	2023	PURE Insurance Championship	(Thailand) Thongchai Jaidee	Lost to par on fourth extra hole

== Major championships ==
=== Wins (1) ===
Year	Championship	54 holes	Winning score	Margin	Runners-up
1997	The Open Championship	5 shot deficit	−12 (69-66-72-65=272)	3 strokes	(Northern Ireland) Darren Clarke, (Sweden) Jesper Parnevik

=== Results timeline ===
Tournament	1993	1994	1995	1996	1997	1998	1999
Masters Tournament	CUT			T27	T7	T8	T18
U.S. Open	T68LA			T50	T36	T40	T15
The Open Championship	CUT		T58	CUT	1	T57	T2
PGA Championship			T8	T5	2	CUT	CUT

Tournament	2000	2001	2002	2003	2004	2005	2006	2007	2008	2009
Masters Tournament	T28	T27	T20	CUT	T35	T13	T39		T20	CUT
U.S. Open	T16	CUT	T12	T20	CUT	T23	CUT	CUT	T36	CUT
The Open Championship	T41	CUT	T14	CUT	T16	T52		CUT	T16	T8
PGA Championship	T41	T10	T4	CUT	T2	CUT	CUT	CUT	T58	T67

Tournament	2010	2011	2012	2013	2014	2015	2016	2017	2018	2019
Masters Tournament	CUT									
U.S. Open	T14				59					
The Open Championship	CUT	CUT	CUT	T13	CUT	CUT	CUT			
PGA Championship	T39									

Tournament	2020	2021	2022	2023	2024	2025
Masters Tournament						
PGA Championship						
U.S. Open						
The Open Championship	NT				CUT	T59

Win
Top 10
Did not play

LA = low amateur
CUT = missed the half way cut
NT = no tournament due to COVID-19 pandemic
"T" indicates a tie for a place.

=== Summary ===
Tournament	Wins	2nd	3rd	Top-5	Top-10	Top-25	Events	Cuts made
Masters Tournament	0	0	0	0	2	6	15	11
U.S. Open	0	0	0	0	0	5	17	12
The Open Championship	1	1	0	2	3	7	23	11
PGA Championship	0	2	0	4	6	6	17	11
Totals	1	3	0	6	11	24	72	45

- Most consecutive cuts made – 8 (1996 PGA – 1998 Open Championship)
- Longest streak of top-10s – 3 (1997 Open Championship – 1998 Masters)

== The Players Championship ==
=== Wins (1) ===
Year	Championship	54 holes	Winning score	Margin	Runners-up
1998	The Players Championship	5 shot deficit	−10 (72-69-70-67=278)	2 strokes	(United States) Glen Day, (United States) Tom Lehman

=== Results timeline ===
Tournament	1995	1996	1997	1998	1999	2000	2001	2002	2003	2004	2005	2006	2007	2008	2009	2010	2011	2012	2013	2014	2015
The Players Championship	T34	T65	T37	1	T23	T22	CUT	T44	T21	T42	CUT	CUT	CUT	CUT	T32	T52	T57	T70	T55	T38	CUT

Win

CUT = missed the halfway cut
"T" indicates a tie for a place.

== Results in World Golf Championships ==
Tournament	1999	2000	2001	2002	2003	2004	2005	2006	2007	2008	2009	2010
Match Play	R32	R32	R16	R64	R32	R64	R64	R64		4	QF	R64
Championship	T11	T25	NT^{1}	T11		T28	T46			T34	T9	
Invitational	20	T2		T28	T23	T50	T19	T31	T9	T20	44	T22
Champions												

^{1}Cancelled due to 9/11

Top 10
Did not play

QF, R16, R32, R64 = Round in which player lost in match play
"T" = tied
NT = No Tournament
Note that the HSBC Champions did not become a WGC event until 2009.

== U.S. national team appearances ==
Amateur

- Eisenhower Trophy: 1992
- Walker Cup: 1993 (winners)

Professional

- Presidents Cup: 1996 (winners), 1998, 2003 (tie), 2005 (winners), 2009 (winners)
- Ryder Cup: 1997, 1999 (winners), 2008 (winners)
- Dunhill Cup: 1997
- World Cup: 1997, 2003
- Wendy's 3-Tour Challenge (representing PGA Tour): 1998, 1999
