= Kevin Sutherland =

American professional golfer

Personal information
- Full name: Kevin John Sutherland
- Nationality: United States
- Born: July 4, 1964 (age 62) Sacramento, California, U.S.
- Height: 6 ft 1 in (1.85 m)
- Weight: 185 lb (84 kg; 13.2 st)

Career
- Sport: Golf
- College: Fresno State University
- Turned professional: 1987
- Current tour: PGA Tour Champions
- Former tour: PGA Tour
- Professional wins: 8
- Highest ranking: 32 (February 24, 2002)

Number of wins by tour
- PGA Tour: 1
- European Tour: 1
- PGA Tour Champions: 5
- Other: 2

Best results in major championships
- Masters Tournament: T33: 2003
- PGA Championship: T9: 2007
- U.S. Open: T28: 2003
- The Open Championship: T9: 2001

Kevin John Sutherland (born July 4, 1964) is an American professional golfer who plays on the PGA Tour and PGA Tour Champions.

== Early life and amateur career ==
Sutherland was born in Sacramento, California and graduated from Christian Brothers High School. He attended Fresno State University and made the golf team as a walk-on freshman. Teased by his teammates for his unorthodox swing and unusual grip, he silenced his peers as he gained All-American status twice in his four years at Fresno State and became the most successful player ever to have spent time there. His younger brother David also attended Fresno while Kevin was there and followed in his brother's footsteps as an All-American golfer.

== Professional career ==
As a professional, Sutherland qualified for the PGA Tour in 1992. He won the WGC-Accenture Match Play Championship in 2002 in his 184th start. It was his only PGA Tour win in 447 starts. He had an exceptional 2008 season that included six top-ten finishes, including playoff losses to Vijay Singh at the Barclays and Cameron Beckman at the Frys.com Open. This runner-up finish vaulted Sutherland well inside the top thirty on the 2008 PGA Tour money list, and secured him a spot in the 2009 Masters Tournament.

He has featured in the top 50 of the Official World Golf Rankings, peaking at 32nd in 2002. Back and neck injuries forced Sutherland to limit his PGA Tour career in 2011 and 2012. Sutherland returned to playing full-time in 2013. He fell short of satisfying his medical extension, but earned enough to remain on the PGA Tour with conditional status for the remainder of 2013.

=== Senior career ===
On Saturday, August 16, 2014, at the second round of the Dick's Sporting Goods Open, Sutherland became the first person on the Champions Tour to shoot a 59, going −13 on the par-72 course.

On November 12, 2017, Sutherland earned his first PGA Tour Champions win at the Charles Schwab Cup Championship and overcame the seven wins of Bernhard Langer to win the Charles Schwab Cup.

On April 1, 2019, Sutherland won his second PGA Tour Champions tournament at the Rapiscan Systems Classic in Mississippi. Sutherland won in a seven-hole playoff over Scott Parel. The playoff was held over two days because play had to be suspended on Sunday March 31, 2019 due to darkness. Sutherland and Parel faced off in a playoff again in June at the Principal Charity Classic with Sutherland winning on the second extra hole.

In November 2020, Sutherland won the Charles Schwab Cup Championship for the second time. Sutherland won in a Monday finish on the ninth playoff hole over Paul Broadhurst. On February 28, 2021, Sutherland won the Cologuard Classic in Tucson, Arizona. He won by two strokes over Mike Weir.

== Professional wins (8) ==
=== PGA Tour wins (1) ===
Legend
World Golf Championships (1)
Other PGA Tour (0)

No.	Date	Tournament	Winning score	Margin of victory	Runner-up
1	Jan 15, 2002	WGC-Accenture Match Play Championship	1 up		(United States) Scott McCarron

PGA Tour playoff record (0–3)

No.	Year	Tournament	Opponent(s)	Result
1	1997	Shell Houston Open	(United States) Phil Blackmar	Lost to birdie on first extra hole
2	2008	The Barclays	(Spain) Sergio García, (Fiji) Vijay Singh	Singh won with birdie on second extra hole Sutherland eliminated by birdie on first hole
3	2008	Frys.com Open	(United States) Cameron Beckman	Lost to par on second extra hole

=== Other wins (2) ===
No.	Date	Tournament	Winning score	Margin of victory	Runner-up
1	Nov 20, 2000	Callaway Golf Pebble Beach Invitational	−13 (69-67-70-69=275)	1 stroke	(United States) Don Pooley
2	Nov 24, 2019	TaylorMade Pebble Beach Invitational (2)	−12 (72-70-67-67=276)	3 strokes	(United States) Martin Flores

=== PGA Tour Champions wins (5) ===
Legend
Charles Schwab Cup playoff events (1)
Other PGA Tour Champions (4)

No.	Date	Tournament	Winning score	Margin of victory	Runner-up
1	Nov 12, 2017	Charles Schwab Cup Championship	−15 (69-63-66=198)	1 stroke	(Fiji) Vijay Singh
2	Apr 1, 2019	Rapiscan Systems Classic	−7 (65-69-75=209)	Playoff	(United States) Scott Parel
3	Jun 2, 2019	Principal Charity Classic	−17 (72-65-62=199)	Playoff	(United States) Scott Parel
4	Nov 9, 2020	Charles Schwab Cup Championship (2)	−15 (65-64-69=198)	Playoff	(England) Paul Broadhurst
5	Feb 28, 2021	Cologuard Classic	−15 (68-67-69=204)	1 stroke	(Canada) Mike Weir

PGA Tour Champions playoff record (3–2)

No.	Year	Tournament	Opponent(s)	Result
1	2015	Regions Tradition	(United States) Jeff Maggert	Lost to par on first extra hole
2	2016	Boeing Classic	(Germany) Bernhard Langer, (United States) Woody Austin	Langer won with birdie on first extra hole
3	2019	Rapiscan Systems Classic	(United States) Scott Parel	Won with birdie on seventh extra hole
4	2019	Principal Charity Classic	(United States) Scott Parel	Won with birdie on second extra hole
5	2020	Charles Schwab Cup Championship	(England) Paul Broadhurst	Won with birdie on ninth extra hole

== Results in major championships ==
Tournament	1996	1997	1998	1999
Masters Tournament				
U.S. Open	CUT		CUT	
The Open Championship				
PGA Championship		T76	T44	CUT

Tournament	2000	2001	2002	2003	2004	2005	2006	2007	2008	2009
Masters Tournament			CUT	T33						T46
U.S. Open		T44	T37	T28	CUT			T58		T33
The Open Championship		T9	CUT							T60
PGA Championship	CUT	CUT	T43	T18	CUT	77		T9	T63	T32

Tournament	2010	2011	2012	2013	2014
Masters Tournament					
U.S. Open				T67	CUT
The Open Championship					
PGA Championship	CUT				

Top 10
Did not play

CUT = missed the half-way cut
"T" = tied

=== Summary ===
Tournament	Wins	2nd	3rd	Top-5	Top-10	Top-25	Events	Cuts made
Masters Tournament	0	0	0	0	0	0	3	2
U.S. Open	0	0	0	0	0	0	10	6
The Open Championship	0	0	0	0	1	1	3	2
PGA Championship	0	0	0	0	1	2	13	8
Totals	0	0	0	0	2	3	29	18

- Most consecutive cuts made – 8 (2005 PGA – 2009 PGA)
- Longest streak of top-10s – 1 (twice)

== Results in The Players Championship ==
Tournament	1998	1999	2000	2001	2002	2003	2004	2005	2006	2007	2008	2009	2010	2011
The Players Championship	T42	CUT	CUT	T58	CUT	T48	T6	T68	CUT	T58	CUT	T32	CUT	CUT

Top 10

CUT = missed the halfway cut
"T" indicates a tie for a place

== World Golf Championships ==
=== Wins (1) ===
Year	Championship	54 holes	Winning score	Margin	Runner-up
2002	WGC-Accenture Match Play Championship	n/a	1 up		(United States) Scott McCarron

=== Results timeline ===
Tournament	2001	2002	2003	2004	2005	2006	2007	2008	2009
Match Play	R64	1	R16						R64
Championship	NT^{1}	T27							T61
Invitational		T58							
Champions									

^{1}Canceled due to 9/11

Win
Top 10
Did not play

QF, R16, R32, R64 = Round in which player lost in match play
"T" = Tied
NT = No tournament
Note that the HSBC Champions did not become a WGC event until 2009.

== Results in senior major championships ==
Results not in chronological order before 2022.

Tournament	2014	2015	2016	2017	2018	2019	2020	2021	2022	2023	2024	2025	2026
Senior PGA Championship		T13	T19	T17	T10		NT		T29	T20		CUT	T51
The Tradition		2	T17	T13	12	T37	NT		20	T28	T22		
U.S. Senior Open	T38	T7	T6	T29	T38	T8	NT	T5	T28	CUT	T48	T18	WD
Senior Players Championship		T10	T13	T9	T17	T13	T8	T7	T44	T23	T11	T18	T40
Senior British Open Championship		T19	T12		T24		NT					T8	

Top 10
Did not play

CUT = missed the halfway cut
WD = withdrew
"T" indicates a tie for a place
NT = no tournament due to COVID-19 pandemic

== See also ==
- 1995 PGA Tour Qualifying School graduates
- 1996 PGA Tour Qualifying School graduates
- Lowest rounds of golf
