= 2004 Players Championship =

Tournament information
- Dates: March 25–28, 2004
- Location: Ponte Vedra Beach, Florida; 30.198°N 81.394°W
- Courses: TPC Sawgrass, Stadium Course
- Tour: PGA Tour

Statistics
- Par: 72
- Length: 7,093 yards (6,486 m)
- Field: 148 players, 83 after cut
- Cut: 146 (+2)
- Prize fund: $8.0 million
- Winner's share: $1.44 million

Champion
- (Australia) Adam Scott
- 276 (−12)
- Location in the United States Location in Florida

The 2004 Players Championship was a golf tournament in Florida on the PGA Tour, held March 25–28 at TPC Sawgrass in Ponte Vedra Beach, southeast of Jacksonville. It was the 31st Players Championship.

== Tournament summary ==
Adam Scott, age 23, held on for his second PGA Tour title, one stroke ahead of runner-up Pádraig Harrington, who started the final round five shots behind. With a two-shot lead on the 72nd hole, Scott put his approach shot in the water then sank a 10-foot (3 m) putt for bogey to win.

Defending champion Davis Love III finished twelve strokes back, in a tie for 33rd place.

Scott was the youngest champion for thirteen years, until Kim Si-woo won at age 21 in 2017. Previously, it was Fred Couples, age 24 in 1984.

== Venue ==
This was the 23rd Players Championship held at the TPC at Sawgrass Stadium Course and it remained at 7,093 yards (6,486 m).

== Eligibility requirements ==
1. Winners of PGA Tour co-sponsored or approved tournaments, whose victories are considered official, since the previous year's Players Championship.

Ben Crane, Mike Weir, Davis Love III, Fred Couples, Steve Flesch, David Toms, Vijay Singh, Kenny Perry, Rory Sabbatini, Jonathan Kaye, Tiger Woods, Ben Curtis, Craig Stadler, Peter Jacobsen, Shaun Micheel, Darren Clarke, Kirk Triplett, Adam Scott, Bob Tway, J. L. Lewis, Tommy Armour III, John Huston, Stuart Appleby, Shigeki Maruyama, Retief Goosen, Chad Campbell, Ernie Els, Phil Mickelson, John Daly, Heath Slocum, Craig Parry, Todd Hamilton

2. The top 125 finishers on the 2003 Official PGA Tour Money List.

Brad Faxon, Charles Howell III, Jay Haas, Justin Leonard, Chris DiMarco, Scott Verplank, Nick Price, Briny Baird, Chris Riley, Robert Allenby, Tim Herron, Jerry Kelly, Fred Funk, K. J. Choi, Bob Estes, Stewart Cink, Tim Petrovic, John Rollins, Jeff Sluman, Robert Gamez, Woody Austin, Geoff Ogilvy, Jonathan Byrd, Frank Lickliter, Peter Lonard, Brenden Pappas, Loren Roberts, Tim Clark, Scott McCarron, Len Mattiace, Tom Pernice Jr., Duffy Waldorf, Scott Hoch, Alex Čejka, Tom Lehman, Lee Janzen, Mark Calcavecchia, Joe Durant, Kevin Sutherland, Rod Pampling, Hidemichi Tanaka, Skip Kendall, Rich Beem, Stephen Ames, Aaron Baddeley, Carl Pettersson, Hal Sutton, Steve Lowery, Matt Gogel, Billy Mayfair, Glen Day, Brett Quigley, Harrison Frazar, David Gossett, Jeff Maggert, Cliff Kresge, Paul Stankowski, Luke Donald, Brandt Jobe, Joey Sindelar, David Peoples, Carlos Franco, Sergio García, J. J. Henry, Billy Andrade, Dean Wilson, Jeff Brehaut, Craig Barlow, Jay Williamson, Todd Fischer, Arron Oberholser, Patrick Sheehan, Stephen Allan, Cameron Beckman, John Senden, Tom Byrum, Neal Lancaster, Brent Geiberger, J. P. Hayes, David Frost, Robert Damron, Pat Perez, Jesper Parnevik, Notah Begay III, Richard S. Johnson, Bernhard Langer, Kent Jones, Pat Bates, Glen Hnatiuk, Esteban Toledo

3. Members in the top 125 non-members category whose official money for the previous year equals or exceeds the amount of official money earned by the player finishing in the 125th position on the 2003 Official PGA Tour Money List.

Pádraig Harrington, Hank Kuehne, Freddie Jacobson, Stephen Leaney, Justin Rose, Thomas Bjørn

4. PGA Tour members from the current Tournament Winners category

Steve Stricker, Matt Kuchar, Spike McRoy, Chris Smith, Gene Sauers, Bob Burns

5. Winners of the Players Championship, Masters, U.S. Open, British Open, and PGA Championship from 1994 to 1997 and from 1999 to 2003. Beginning with 1998, winners will be eligible for 5 years.

Greg Norman, Steve Elkington, José María Olazábal, Nick Faldo, Corey Pavin, Mark Brooks, Craig Perks, Paul Lawrie

6. Winners of the NEC World Series of Golf in the last 10 years (1994–1997).

7. Winners of the Tour Championship in the last three years (2001–2003).

8. Winners of the WGC-Accenture Match Play Championship in the last three years (2002–2004).

9. Winners of the WGC-NEC Invitational and WGC-American Express Championship in the last three years (2001–2003).

10. Any player(s), not otherwise eligible, among the top 50 leaders from the Official World Golf Ranking through the Bay Hill Invitational.

Paul Casey, Colin Montgomerie, Trevor Immelman, Ian Poulter, Brian Davis

11. Any player(s), not otherwise eligible, among the top 10 leaders from the 2004 Official PGA Tour Money List through the Bay Hill Invitational.

12. If necessary to complete a field of 144 players, PGA Tour members from the 2004 Official PGA Tour Money List below 10th position through the Bay Hill Invitational, in order of their positions on such list.

John Riegger

13. The Players Championship committee may invite a player(s), not otherwise eligible, who is a current inductee of the World Golf Hall of Fame. (Note: Such a player would be added to the field.)

== Round summaries ==
=== First round ===
Thursday, March 25, 2004

Place	Player	Score	To par
1	(Australia) Adam Scott	65	−7
T2	(United States) Kevin Sutherland	66	−6
T2	(United States) Duffy Waldorf	66	−6
T4	(Denmark) Thomas Bjørn	67	−5
T4	(United States) Bob Burns	67	−5
T4	(South Korea) K. J. Choi	67	−5
T7	(South Africa) Ernie Els	68	−4
T7	(Spain) Sergio García	68	−4
T7	(Republic of Ireland) Pádraig Harrington	68	−4
T7	(United States) Brandt Jobe	68	−4
T7	(United States) Scott Verplank	68	−4

=== Second round ===
Friday, March 26, 2004

Place	Player	Score	To par
T1	(United States) Jerry Kelly	69-66=135	−9
T1	(United States) Kevin Sutherland	66-69=135	−9
T3	(South Africa) Ernie Els	68-69=137	−7
T3	(Australia) Adam Scott	65-72=137	−7
T5	(Republic of Ireland) Pádraig Harrington	68-70=138	−6
T5	(Fiji) Vijay Singh	70-68=138	−6
T7	(United States) Bob Burns	67-72=139	−5
T7	(United States) Phil Mickelson	70-69=139	−5
T7	(United States) Jeff Sluman	69-70=139	−5
T7	(United States) Duffy Waldorf	66-73=139	−5

=== Third round ===
Saturday, March 27, 2004

Place	Player	Score	To par
1	(Australia) Adam Scott	65-72-69=206	−10
T2	(United States) Frank Lickliter	69-71-68=208	−8
T2	(United States) Kevin Sutherland	66-69-73=208	−8
T4	(South Africa) Ernie Els	68-69-72=209	−7
T4	(United States) Jerry Kelly	69-66-74=209	−7
T4	(United States) Phil Mickelson	70-69-70=209	−7
T4	(United States) Kenny Perry	69-71-69=209	−7
T4	(United States) Paul Stankowski	73-70-66=209	−7
T9	(Australia) Craig Parry	74-72-64=210	−6
T9	(Fiji) Vijay Singh	70-68-72=210	−6
T9	(United States) Duffy Waldorf	66-73-71=210	−6

=== Final round ===
Sunday, March 28, 2004

Champion
(c) = past champion

Place	Player	Score	To par	Money ($)
1	(Australia) Adam Scott	65-72-69-70=276	−12	1,440,000
2	(Republic of Ireland) Pádraig Harrington	68-70-73-66=277	−11	864,000
T3	(United States) Frank Lickliter	69-71-68-72=280	−8	416,000
T3	(United States) Phil Mickelson	70-69-70-71=280	−8	416,000
T3	(United States) Kenny Perry	69-71-69-71=280	−8	416,000
T6	(United States) Jay Haas	72-73-70-66=281	−7	268,000
T6	(United States) Jerry Kelly	69-66-74-72=281	−7	268,000
T6	(United States) Kevin Sutherland	66-69-73-73=281	−7	268,000
9	(United States) Shaun Micheel	70-76-69-67=282	−6	232,000
T10	(United States) Bob Burns	67-72-72-72=283	−5	200,000
T10	(England) Paul Casey	72-70-69-72=283	−5	200,000
T10	(United States) Fred Funk	73-71-68-71=283	−5	200,000

Leaderboard below the top 10
Place	Player	Score	To par	Money ($)
T13	(Trinidad and Tobago) Stephen Ames	75-69-72-68=284	−4	154,666
T13	(Australia) Craig Parry	74-72-64-74=284	−4	154,666
T13	(Fiji) Vijay Singh	70-68-72-74=284	−4	154,666
T16	(United States) Woody Austin	76-69-66-74=285	−3	116,000
T16	(United States) Tom Byrum	74-71-71-69=285	−3	116,000
T16	(United States) Matt Kuchar	74-67-71-73=285	−3	116,000
T16	(Australia) Geoff Ogilvy	73-70-72-70=285	−3	116,000
T16	(United States) Paul Stankowski	73-70-66-76=285	−3	116,000
T16	(United States) Tiger Woods (c)	75-69-68-73=285	−3	116,000
T22	(Denmark) Thomas Bjørn	67-76-73-70=286	−2	80,000
T22	(United States) Stewart Cink	70-73-74-69=286	−2	80,000
T22	(United States) Glen Day	71-75-67-73=286	−2	80,000
T22	(United States) J. P. Hayes	72-73-72-69=286	−2	80,000
T26	(United States) Cameron Beckman	70-71-72-74=287	−1	56,800
T26	(Northern Ireland) Darren Clarke	71-74-73-69=287	−1	56,800
T26	(Australia) Steve Elkington (c)	69-76-70-72=287	−1	56,800
T26	(South Africa) Ernie Els	68-69-72-78=287	−1	56,800
T26	(United States) John Huston	72-71-71-73=287	−1	56,800
T26	(United States) Jeff Sluman	69-70-73-75=287	−1	56,800
T26	(United States) Scott Verplank	68-75-73-71=287	−1	56,800
T33	(Australia) Robert Allenby	71-73-70-74=288	E	39,644
T33	(United States) Briny Baird	71-74-70-73=288	E	39,644
T33	(Germany) Alex Čejka	69-71-73-75=288	E	39,644
T33	(United States) Davis Love III (c)	77-68-70-73=288	E	39,644
T33	(United States) Jeff Maggert	73-73-70-72=288	E	39,644
T33	(United States) Len Mattiace	74-69-74-71=288	E	39,644
T33	(Sweden) Jesper Parnevik	72-71-73-72=288	E	39,644
T33	(United States) Corey Pavin	74-67-74-73=288	E	39,644
T33	(England) Ian Poulter	70-73-71-74=288	E	39,644
T42	(United States) Pat Bates	73-73-73-70=289	+1	24,087
T42	(United States) Chad Campbell	75-69-71-74=289	+1	24,087
T42	(South Korea) K. J. Choi	67-79-69-74=289	+1	24,087
T42	(United States) Brad Faxon	70-75-73-71=289	+1	24,087
T42	(United States) Scott Hoch	70-71-77-71=289	+1	24,087
T42	(United States) Justin Leonard (c)	75-69-72-73=289	+1	24,087
T42	(Scotland) Colin Montgomerie	73-73-73-70=289	+1	24,087
T42	(United States) David Peoples	72-72-73-72=289	+1	24,087
T42	(Zimbabwe) Nick Price (c)	75-69-73-72=289	+1	24,087
T42	(United States) Brett Quigley	73-73-69-74=289	+1	24,087
T42	(South Africa) Rory Sabbatini	73-68-75-73=289	+1	24,087
T53	(Spain) Sergio García	68-73-72-77=290	+2	18,432
T53	(United States) Matt Gogel	72-71-70-77=290	+2	18,432
T53	(Japan) Shigeki Maruyama	70-73-74-73=290	+2	18,432
T53	(United States) Scott McCarron	76-70-69-75=290	+2	18,432
T53	(United States) Tim Petrovic	71-72-74-73=290	+2	18,432
T58	(United States) Joe Durant	74-71-72-74=291	+3	17,360
T58	(Paraguay) Carlos Franco	74-70-74-73=291	+3	17,360
T58	(United States) Todd Hamilton	71-72-76-72=291	+3	17,360
T58	(United States) Billy Mayfair	76-70-70-75=291	+3	17,360
T58	(Australia) Rod Pampling	73-71-72-75=291	+3	17,360
T58	(England) Justin Rose	73-73-70-75=291	+3	17,360
T58	(Australia) John Senden	73-72-70-76=291	+3	17,360
T58	(United States) Heath Slocum	73-73-72-73=291	+3	17,360
T66	(United States) Mark Calcavecchia	71-72-72-77=292	+4	16,240
T66	(United States) Ben Crane	71-72-71-78=292	+4	16,240
T66	(United States) Spike McRoy	74-71-75-72=292	+4	16,240
T66	(United States) Arron Oberholser	73-73-75-71=292	+4	16,240
T66	(United States) Loren Roberts	73-70-79-70=292	+4	16,240
T66	(United States) Craig Stadler	70-76-74-72=292	+4	16,240
T72	(England) Nick Faldo	71-75-71-76=293	+5	15,600
T72	(United States) Tom Pernice Jr.	72-71-70-80=293	+5	15,600
T74	(United States) Brandt Jobe	68-75-76-75=294	+6	15,200
T74	(United States) Joey Sindelar	73-70-73-78=294	+6	15,200
T74	(United States) Duffy Waldorf	66-73-71-84=294	+6	15,200
T77	(Germany) Bernhard Langer	71-74-73-77=295	+7	14,800
T77	(United States) Bob Tway	69-71-78-77=295	+7	14,800
79	(United States) John Daly	69-73-76-80=298	+10	14,560
80	(United States) Peter Jacobsen	72-73-71-83=299	+11	14,400
T81	(Australia) Greg Norman (c)	72-73-77-79=301	+13	14,160
T81	(Japan) Hidemichi Tanaka	72-71-74-84=301	+13	14,160
83	(United States) Neal Lancaster	72-71-80-79=302	+14	13,920
CUT	(Australia) Stuart Appleby	71-76=147	+3	
CUT	(United States) Lee Janzen (c)	75-72=147	+3	
CUT	(United States) Jonathan Kaye	76-71=147	+3	
CUT	(United States) Skip Kendall	73-74=147	+3	
CUT	(United States) Cliff Kresge	71-76=147	+3	
CUT	(Scotland) Paul Lawrie	74-73=147	+3	
CUT	(United States) J. L. Lewis	74-73=147	+3	
CUT	(United States) John Rollins	72-75=147	+3	
CUT	(United States) Patrick Sheehan	74-73=147	+3	
CUT	(United States) Kirk Triplett	71-76=147	+3	
CUT	(United States) Jonathan Byrd	73-75=148	+4	
CUT	(United States) Ben Curtis	75-73=148	+4	
CUT	(England) Luke Donald	72-76=148	+4	
CUT	(United States) Todd Fischer	72-76=148	+4	
CUT	(South Africa) Brenden Pappas	77-71=148	+4	
CUT	(United States) Pat Perez	73-75=148	+4	
CUT	(United States) John Riegger	74-74=148	+4	
CUT	(United States) Gene Sauers	74-74=148	+4	
CUT	(Mexico) Esteban Toledo	71-77=148	+4	
CUT	(United States) David Toms	73-75=148	+4	
CUT	(United States) Robert Damron	76-73=149	+5	
CUT	(United States) Robert Gamez	70-79=149	+5	
CUT	(United States) J. J. Henry	74-75=149	+5	
CUT	(United States) Tom Lehman	74-75=149	+5	
CUT	(New Zealand) Craig Perks (c)	70-79=149	+5	
CUT	(Canada) Mike Weir	74-75=149	+5	
CUT	(United States) Notah Begay III	72-78=150	+6	
CUT	(South Africa) Tim Clark	73-77=150	+6	
CUT	(United States) Bob Estes	72-78=150	+6	
CUT	(United States) Steve Flesch	76-74=150	+6	
CUT	(United States) Charles Howell III	75-75=150	+6	
CUT	(Spain) José María Olazábal	76-74=150	+6	
CUT	(Sweden) Carl Pettersson	75-75=150	+6	
CUT	(United States) Steve Stricker	73-77=150	+6	
CUT	(United States) Dean Wilson	75-75=150	+6	
CUT	(Australia) Stephen Allan	76-75=151	+7	
CUT	(United States) Tommy Armour III	75-76=151	+7	
CUT	(United States) Rich Beem	71-80=151	+7	
CUT	(England) Brian Davis	77-74=151	+7	
CUT	(United States) Chris DiMarco	74-77=151	+7	
CUT	(Sweden) Freddie Jacobson	73-78=151	+7	
CUT	(United States) Kent Jones	74-77=151	+7	
CUT	(United States) Hal Sutton (c)	74-77=151	+7	
CUT	(United States) Fred Couples (c)	74-78=152	+8	
CUT	(South Africa) Retief Goosen	77-75=152	+8	
CUT	(United States) Chris Smith	77-75=152	+8	
CUT	(United States) Jeff Brehaut	77-76=153	+9	
CUT	(United States) Mark Brooks	78-76=154	+10	
CUT	(South Africa) David Frost	76-78=154	+10	
CUT	(United States) Tim Herron	76-78=154	+10	
CUT	(United States) Hank Kuehne	72-82=154	+10	
CUT	(Australia) Stephen Leaney	78-76=154	+10	
CUT	(United States) Steve Lowery	76-78=154	+10	
CUT	(United States) Chris Riley	75-79=154	+10	
CUT	(Australia) Aaron Baddeley	74-81=155	+11	
CUT	(Sweden) Richard S. Johnson	75-80=155	+11	
CUT	(Australia) Peter Lonard	80-75=155	+11	
CUT	(United States) Jay Williamson	77-78=155	+11	
CUT	(United States) Billy Andrade	76-80=156	+12	
CUT	(United States) Harrison Frazar	77-79=156	+12	
CUT	(United States) David Gossett	79-77=156	+12	
CUT	(Canada) Glen Hnatiuk	78-78=156	+12	
CUT	(United States) Craig Barlow	81-78=159	+15	
WD	(United States) Brent Geiberger	75	+3	
WD	(South Africa) Trevor Immelman			

==== Scorecard ====
Final round

Hole	1	2	3	4	5	6	7	8	9	10	11	12	13	14	15	16	17	18
Par	4	5	3	4	4	4	4	3	5	4	5	4	3	4	4	5	3	4
(Australia) Scott	−10	−11	−10	−11	−11	−12	−12	−13	−13	−12	−13	−14	−14	−13	−13	−13	−13	−12
(Republic of Ireland) Harrington	−5	−4	−3	−4	−3	−3	−4	−4	−5	−5	−6	−6	−6	−7	−8	−10	−10	−11
(United States) Lickliter	−7	−7	−6	−7	−7	−7	−7	−7	−7	−7	−7	−7	−6	−6	−7	−7	−8	−8
(United States) Mickelson	−7	−8	−8	−9	−9	−9	−9	−8	−9	−9	−9	−9	−8	−9	−9	−8	−8	−8
(United States) Perry	−8	−8	−8	−9	−9	−8	−8	−8	−8	−9	−9	−9	−10	−9	−8	−9	−9	−8
(United States) Sutherland	−7	−7	−7	−7	−7	−6	−6	−5	−5	−5	−5	−5	−5	−5	−6	−7	−7	−7

Cumulative tournament scores, relative to par

Eagle	Birdie	Bogey
