= 1999 Players Championship =

Tournament information
- Dates: March 25–28, 1999
- Location: Ponte Vedra Beach, Florida; 30.198°N 81.394°W
- Courses: TPC Sawgrass, Stadium Course
- Tour: PGA Tour

Statistics
- Par: 72
- Length: 7,093 yards (6,486 m)
- Field: 145 players, 79 after cut
- Cut: 148 (+4)
- Prize fund: $5.0 million
- Winner's share: $900,000

Champion
- (United States) David Duval
- 285 (−3)

Location map
- Location in the United States Location in Florida

The 1999 Players Championship was a golf tournament in Florida on the PGA Tour, held March 25–28 at TPC Sawgrass in Ponte Vedra Beach, southeast of Jacksonville. It was the 26th Players Championship.

David Duval won his only Players Championship, two strokes head of runner-up Scott Gump. The victory moved him to number one in the Official World Golf Ranking, ahead of Tiger Woods, who finished six strokes back in a tie for tenth place.

Duval's father Bob, age 52, won the same day at the Emerald Coast Classic near Pensacola for his first victory on the Senior Tour. Both led entering the final round.

Duval's winning score of 285 (−3) remains the highest at the Stadium Course, the venue since 1982. The lowest is 264 (−24) by Greg Norman in 1994.

Defending champion Justin Leonard finished nine strokes back, in a tie for 23rd place.

== Venue ==
This was the 18th Players Championship held at the TPC at Sawgrass Stadium Course; its 1999 setup measured 7,093 yards (6,486 m), an increase of 143 yards (131 m).

== Field ==
1. Winners of PGA Tour co-sponsored or approved tournaments, whose victories are considered official, since the 1998 Players Championship

- Stuart Appleby
- Olin Browne
- John Cook
- Fred Couples
- Trevor Dodds
- Joe Durant
- David Duval
- Steve Elkington
- Ernie Els
- Fred Funk
- Jim Furyk
- Tim Herron
- Gabriel Hjertstedt
- John Huston
- Lee Janzen
- Steve Jones
- Davis Love III
- Jeff Maggert
- Billy Mayfair
- Rocco Mediate
- Phil Mickelson
- Mark O'Meara
- J. P. Hayes
- Steve Pate
- Nick Price
- Vijay Singh
- Jeff Sluman
- Payne Stewart
- Hal Sutton
- Tom Watson
- Lee Westwood
- Tiger Woods

2. Those players among the top 125 finishers on the 1998 Official Money List

- Billy Andrade
- Tommy Armour III
- Paul Azinger
- Doug Barron
- Ben Bates
- Michael Bradley
- Tom Byrum
- Mark Calcavecchia
- Jim Carter
- Brandel Chamblee
- Barry Cheesman
- Stewart Cink
- Russ Cochran
- John Daly
- Robert Damron
- Glen Day
- Clark Dennis
- Chris DiMarco
- Jay Don Blake
- Bob Estes
- Brad Fabel
- Brad Faxon
- Steve Flesch
- Dan Forsman
- Harrison Frazar
- Bob Friend
- Jeff Gallagher
- Brent Geiberger
- Bill Glasson
- Paul Goydos
- Scott Gump
- Jay Haas
- Dudley Hart
- Nolan Henke
- Brian Henninger
- Scott Hoch
- Bradley Hughes
- Mike Hulbert
- Peter Jacobsen
- Jerry Kelly
- Skip Kendall
- Greg Kraft
- Neal Lancaster
- Franklin Langham
- Tom Lehman
- Justin Leonard
- J. L. Lewis
- Frank Lickliter
- Bruce Lietzke
- Steve Lowery
- Andrew Magee
- Doug Martin
- Len Mattiace
- Blaine McCallister
- Scott McCarron
- Larry Mize
- Colin Montgomerie
- Frank Nobilo
- Joe Ozaki
- Jesper Parnevik
- Craig Parry
- Tom Pernice Jr.
- Chris Perry
- Kenny Perry
- Lee Porter
- Mike Reid
- Lee Rinker
- Larry Rinker
- Loren Roberts
- Scott Simpson
- Joey Sindelar
- Mike Springer
- Craig Stadler
- Paul Stankowski
- Steve Stricker
- David Sutherland
- Kevin Sutherland
- Phil Tataurangi
- Esteban Toledo
- Tommy Tolles
- David Toms
- Kirk Triplett
- Ted Tryba
- Bob Tway
- Omar Uresti
- Scott Verplank
- Grant Waite
- Duffy Waldorf
- Brian Watts
- Kevin Wentworth
- Mark Wiebe
- Willie Wood
- Fuzzy Zoeller

3. Winners of the Players Championship, Masters Tournament, U.S. Open, British Open (only since 1990), and PGA Championship in the last 10 years (1989-1998)

- Mark Brooks
- Ben Crenshaw
- Nick Faldo
- Wayne Grady
- Tom Kite
- Bernhard Langer
- Greg Norman
- José María Olazábal
- Corey Pavin
- Curtis Strange
- Ian Woosnam

4. Winners of the NEC World Series of Golf in the last 10 years (1989-1998)

- Fulton Allem
- David Frost
- Tom Purtzer

5. Winners of the Tour Championship in the last three years, beginning with the 1998 winner

6. Winner of the World Golf Championship events in the last three years, beginning with the 1999 winners

7. Any player(s), not otherwise eligible, among the top 50 leaders from the Official World Golf Ranking through the Bay Hill Invitational

- Darren Clarke
- Miguel Ángel Jiménez
- Brandt Jobe
- Shigeki Maruyama

8. Any players, not otherwise eligibility, who are among the top 10 money-winners from the 1999 Official Money List through the Bay Hill Invitational

9. To complete a field of 144 players, those players, not otherwise eligible, from the 1999 Official Money List below the 10th position through the Bay Hill Invitational, in order of their position on the money list

- Carlos Franco

10. The Players Championship Committee may invite a player(s), not otherwise eligible, who is a current inductee of the World Golf Hall of Fame

- Seve Ballesteros

== Round summaries ==
=== First round ===
Thursday, March 25, 1999

Place	Player	Score	To par
T1	(United States) Bob Estes	68	−4
T1	(United States) Brian Watts	68	−4
T3	(United States) David Duval	69	−3
T3	(Japan) Joe Ozaki	69	−3
T3	(United States) Hal Sutton	69	−3
T6	(United States) Dudley Hart	70	−2
T6	(Australia) Bradley Hughes	70	−2
T6	(United States) Skip Kendall	70	−2
T6	(United States) Davis Love III	70	−2
T6	(United States) Billy Mayfair	70	−2
T6	(United States) Chris Perry	70	−2
T6	(United States) Jeff Sluman	70	−2
T6	(United States) Kirk Triplett	70	−2
T6	(United States) Tiger Woods	70	−2

=== Second round ===
Friday, March 26, 1999

Place	Player	Score	To par
1	(Japan) Joe Ozaki	69-68=137	−7
2	(United States) David Duval	69-69=138	−6
3	(United States) Bruce Lietzke	71-68=139	−5
T4	(South Africa) Ernie Els	73-67=140	−4
T4	(United States) Davis Love III	70-70=140	−4
T4	(United States) Curtis Strange	71-69=140	−4
T7	(South Africa) Fulton Allem	74-67=141	−3
T7	(United States) Fred Funk	72-69=141	−3
T7	(United States) Frank Lickliter	71-70=141	−3
T7	(Zimbabwe) Nick Price	74-67=141	−3
T7	(United States) Tiger Woods	70-71=141	−3

=== Third round ===
Saturday, March 27, 1999

Place	Player	Score	To par
1	(United States) David Duval	69-69-74=212	−4
T2	(United States) Skip Kendall	70-73-70=213	−3
T2	(United States) Phil Mickelson	71-71-71=213	−3
T4	(United States) Scott Hoch	72-70-73=215	−1
T4	(Scotland) Colin Montgomerie	72-70-73=215	−1
T4	(Zimbabwe) Nick Price	74-67-74=215	−1
T7	(United States) Scott Gump	72-74-70=216	E
T7	(United States) Mark O'Meara	72-73-71=216	E
T7	(United States) Payne Stewart	72-70-74=216	E
T7	(United States) Steve Stricker	73-73-70=216	E
T7	(United States) Hal Sutton	69-74-73=216	E
T7	(United States) Tiger Woods	70-71-75=216	E

=== Final round ===
Sunday, March 28, 1999

Champion
(c) = past champion

Place	Player	Score	To par	Money ($)
1	(United States) David Duval	69-69-74-73=285	−3	900,000
2	(United States) Scott Gump	72-74-70-71=287	−1	540,000
3	(Zimbabwe) Nick Price (c)	74-67-74-73=288	E	340,000
T4	(United States) Fred Couples (c)	77-71-73-68=289	+1	220,000
T4	(United States) Hal Sutton (c)	69-74-73-73=289	+1	220,000
T6	(United States) Scott Hoch	72-70-73-75=290	+2	161,875
T6	(United States) Mark O'Meara	72-73-71-74=290	+2	161,875
T6	(United States) Steve Stricker	73-73-70-74=290	+2	161,875
T6	(England) Lee Westwood	73-69-75-73=290	+2	161,875
T10	(United States) Mark Brooks	71-77-71-72=291	+3	107,142
T10	(United States) Mark Calcavecchia	76-70-72-73=291	+3	107,142
T10	(United States) Skip Kendall	70-73-70-78=291	+3	107,142
T10	(United States) Davis Love III (c)	70-70-78-73=291	+3	107,142
T10	(Japan) Naomichi Ozaki	69-68-81-73=291	+3	107,142
T10	(United States) Joey Sindelar	72-71-74-74=291	+3	107,142
T10	(United States) Tiger Woods	70-71-75-75=291	+3	107,142

Leaderboard below the top 10
Place	Player	Score	To par	Money ($)
T17	(South Africa) Ernie Els	73-67-80-72=292	+4	75,000
T17	(United States) Jim Furyk	71-76-73-72=292	+4	75,000
T17	(United States) Duffy Waldorf	71-71-75-75=292	+4	75,000
T20	(United States) John Huston	75-72-73-73=293	+5	60,333
T20	(Fiji) Vijay Singh	77-70-74-72=293	+5	60,333
T20	(United States) David Toms	73-75-74-71=293	+5	60,333
T23	(United States) Brad Fabel	73-70-80-71=294	+6	40,166
T23	(United States) Justin Leonard (c)	72-72-75-75=294	+6	40,166
T23	(United States) Frank Lickliter	71-70-76-77=294	+6	40,166
T23	(United States) Larry Mize	73-71-73-77=294	+6	40,166
T23	(Scotland) Colin Montgomerie	72-70-73-79=294	+6	40,166
T23	(Sweden) Jesper Parnevik	71-73-74-76=294	+6	40,166
T23	(United States) Payne Stewart	72-70-74-78=294	+6	40,166
T23	(United States) Curtis Strange	71-69-78-76=294	+6	40,166
T23	(Mexico) Esteban Toledo	73-75-72-74=294	+6	40,166
T32	(Sweden) Gabriel Hjertstedt	73-72-74-76=295	+7	27,666
T32	(United States) Franklin Langham	71-75-75-74=295	+7	27,666
T32	(United States) Bruce Lietzke	71-68-80-76=295	+7	27,666
T32	(United States) Phil Mickelson	71-71-71-82=295	+7	27,666
T32	(United States) Chris Perry	70-74-73-78=295	+7	27,666
T32	(United States) Scott Verplank	76-71-73-75=295	+7	27,666
T38	(Australia) Steve Elkington (c)	71-73-78-74=296	+8	20,000
T38	(United States) Fred Funk	72-69-76-79=296	+8	20,000
T38	(United States) Paul Goydos	71-74-76-75=296	+8	20,000
T38	(United States) Dudley Hart	70-74-76-76=296	+8	20,000
T38	(Spain) Miguel Ángel Jiménez	76-69-79-72=296	+8	20,000
T38	(Germany) Bernhard Langer	73-72-77-74=296	+8	20,000
T38	(United States) Kirk Triplett	70-75-76-75=296	+8	20,000
T38	(United States) Brian Watts	68-74-78-76=296	+8	20,000
T46	(United States) Chris DiMarco	74-72-76-75=297	+9	13,600
T46	(United States) Brad Faxon	72-75-79-71=297	+9	13,600
T46	(United States) Brent Geiberger	74-71-78-74=297	+9	13,600
T46	(United States) Jeff Maggert	73-71-76-77=297	+9	13,600
T46	(United States) Jeff Sluman	70-72-79-76=297	+9	13,600
T46	(United States) Tommy Tolles	72-73-76-76=297	+9	13,600
T52	(United States) Doug Barron	72-73-77-76=298	+10	11,600
T52	(United States) Robert Damron	74-72-76-76=298	+10	11,600
T52	(United States) Dan Forsman	76-70-78-74=298	+10	11,600
T52	(South Africa) David Frost	74-72-74-78=298	+10	11,600
T52	(United States) Jeff Gallagher	71-73-77-77=298	+10	11,600
T52	(Spain) José María Olazábal	78-70-76-74=298	+10	11,600
T58	(United States) Jay Don Blake	77-71-79-72=299	+11	11,050
T58	(United States) Barry Cheesman	73-74-73-79=299	+11	11,050
T58	(United States) John Cook	78-69-78-74=299	+11	11,050
T58	(United States) Steve Pate	74-74-72-79=299	+11	11,050
T62	(United States) Billy Andrade	73-74-81-72=300	+12	10,500
T62	(United States) Bob Estes	68-74-80-78=300	+12	10,500
T62	(United States) Bob Friend	74-69-87-70=300	+12	10,500
T62	(Australia) Bradley Hughes	70-74-78-78=300	+12	10,500
T62	(United States) Greg Kraft	71-74-82-73=300	+12	10,500
T62	(United States) Craig Stadler	72-70-80-78=300	+12	10,500
T62	(United States) Tom Watson	75-71-79-75=300	+12	10,500
69	(Australia) Craig Parry	75-73-73-80=301	+13	10,100
70	(United States) Tom Byrum	76-72-80-74=302	+14	10,000
T71	(United States) Jim Carter	76-72-76-80=304	+16	9,700
T71	(Northern Ireland) Darren Clarke	77-70-79-78=304	+16	9,700
T71	(United States) Russ Cochran	76-70-79-79=304	+16	9,700
T71	(New Zealand) Frank Nobilo	72-71-80-81=304	+16	9,700
T71	(United States) Corey Pavin	74-74-82-74=304	+16	9,700
76	(United States) Joe Durant	74-74-78-79=305	+17	9,400
T77	(South Africa) Fulton Allem	74-67-83-82=306	+18	9,250
T77	(United States) Tom Kite (c)	76-72-79-79=306	+18	9,250
CUT	(Australia) Stuart Appleby	77-72=149	+5	
CUT	(United States) Paul Azinger	76-73=149	+5	
CUT	(United States) Brandel Chamblee	78-71=149	+5	
CUT	(United States) Stewart Cink	74-75=149	+5	
CUT	(United States) Lee Janzen (c)	75-74=149	+5	
CUT	(United States) Tom Lehman	75-74=149	+5	
CUT	(United States) Doug Martin	72-77=149	+5	
CUT	(United States) Billy Mayfair	70-79=149	+5	
CUT	(United States) Rocco Mediate	71-78=149	+5	
CUT	(Australia) Greg Norman (c)	72-77=149	+5	
CUT	(United States) Mike Reid	75-74=149	+5	
CUT	(United States) Loren Roberts	77-72=149	+5	
CUT	(United States) Scott Simpson	76-73=149	+5	
CUT	(United States) Paul Stankowski	74-75=149	+5	
CUT	(United States) Kevin Sutherland	75-74=149	+5	
CUT	(United States) Ted Tryba	78-71=149	+5	
CUT	(United States) Michael Bradley	77-73=150	+6	
CUT	(United States) Ben Crenshaw	76-74=150	+6	
CUT	(United States) Bill Glasson	77-73=150	+6	
CUT	(United States) Tim Herron	72-78=150	+6	
CUT	(United States) Neal Lancaster	74-76=150	+6	
CUT	(United States) Steve Lowery	77-73=150	+6	
CUT	(United States) Scott McCarron	79-71=150	+6	
CUT	(United States) Larry Rinker	77-73=150	+6	
CUT	(United States) David Sutherland	73-77=150	+6	
CUT	(United States) Kevin Wentworth	73-77=150	+6	
CUT	(United States) Clark Dennis	75-76=151	+7	
CUT	(United States) Lee Rinker	74-77=151	+7	
CUT	(United States) Bob Tway	75-76=151	+7	
CUT	(United States) Mark Wiebe	78-73=151	+7	
CUT	(United States) Ben Bates	74-78=152	+8	
CUT	(Namibia) Trevor Dodds	75-77=152	+8	
CUT	(Paraguay) Carlos Franco	78-74=152	+8	
CUT	(United States) Brandt Jobe	73-79=152	+8	
CUT	(United States) Steve Jones	74-78=152	+8	
CUT	(United States) J. L. Lewis	75-77=152	+8	
CUT	(Wales) Ian Woosnam	80-72=152	+8	
CUT	(United States) Olin Browne	79-74=153	+9	
CUT	(United States) Harrison Frazar	80-73=153	+9	
CUT	(United States) Tom Purtzer	75-78=153	+9	
CUT	(Australia) Wayne Grady	77-77=154	+10	
CUT	(United States) Mike Hulbert	77-77=154	+10	
CUT	(United States) Tom Pernice Jr.	79-75=154	+10	
CUT	(New Zealand) Phil Tataurangi	78-76=154	+10	
CUT	(United States) Andrew Magee	81-74=155	+11	
CUT	(United States) Len Mattiace	76-79=155	+11	
CUT	(United States) Blaine McCallister	78-77=155	+11	
CUT	(United States) Lee Porter	78-77=155	+11	
CUT	(United States) Mike Springer	78-77=155	+11	
CUT	(New Zealand) Grant Waite	82-73=155	+11	
CUT	(United States) Willie Wood	77-78=155	+11	
CUT	(United States) Fuzzy Zoeller	76-79=155	+11	
CUT	(United States) Glen Day	79-77=156	+12	
CUT	(United States) Steve Flesch	78-78=156	+12	
CUT	(United States) Jay Haas	82-74=156	+12	
CUT	(United States) Tommy Armour III	81-76=157	+13	
CUT	(Spain) Seve Ballesteros	76-81=157	+13	
CUT	(United States) J. P. Hayes	81-76=157	+13	
CUT	(United States) Peter Jacobsen	75-82=157	+13	
CUT	(United States) Omar Uresti	78-79=157	+13	
CUT	(United States) Brian Henninger	79-79=158	+14	
CUT	(United States) Jerry Kelly	80-78=158	+14	
CUT	(Japan) Shigeki Maruyama	74-84=158	+14	
CUT	(United States) Nolan Henke	85-76=161	+17	
WD	(United States) Kenny Perry	82	+10	
WD	(United States) John Daly	83	+11	
DQ	(England) Nick Faldo	71-75-83=229	+13	
