= South Carolina Classic =

Buy.com South Carolina Classic
Tournament information
- Location: Florence, South Carolina
- Established: 1991
- Course: Country Club of South Carolina
- Par: 72
- Tour: Buy.com Tour
- Format: Stroke play
- Prize fund: US$400,000
- Month played: April
- Final year: 2000

Tournament record score
- Aggregate: 271 Harrison Frazar (1997)
- To par: −17 as above

Final champion
- (United States) Jeff Gallagher
- Location in the United States Location in South Carolina

The South Carolina Classic was a golf tournament on the Buy.com Tour from 1991 to 2000. It was played at the Country Club of South Carolina in Florence, South Carolina.

The purse in 2000 was US$400,000, with $72,000 going to the winner.

== Winners ==
Year	Winner	Score	To par	Margin of victory	Runner(s)-up
Buy.com South Carolina Classic
2000	(United States) Jeff Gallagher	278	−10	1 stroke	(United States) Lee Porter (United States) Chris Smith (United States) Brett Quigley
Nike South Carolina Classic
1999	(United States) Kevin Johnson	279	−9	1 stroke	(United States) Bob Heintz
1998	(United States) Gene Sauers	280	−8	1 stroke	(United States) Craig Kanada (United States) Sean Murphy
1997	(United States) Harrison Frazar	271	−17	3 strokes	(United States) R. W. Eaks
1996	(United States) Dave Rummells	276	−12	2 strokes	(United States) P. H. Horgan III (United States) Brad Ott (United States) Scott Petersen
1995	(United States) Jerry Foltz	279	−9	1 stroke	(United States) Morris Hatalsky (United States) Tim Simpson (United States) Robert Wrenn
1994	(United States) Charlie Rymer	274	−14	1 stroke	(United States) Pat Bates
1993	(United States) Hugh Royer III	273	−15	1 stroke	(United States) Chris DiMarco (United States) Steve Haskins
Ben Hogan South Carolina Classic
1992	(United States) John Flannery	272	−16	5 strokes	(Australia) Steve Rintoul
1991	(United States) Tom Lehman	202	−14	Playoff	(United States) Ray Pearce
