= Paul Gow =

Australian professional golfer

Personal information
- Full name: Paul Gow
- Nationality: Australia
- Born: 10 November 1970 (age 55) Sydney, Australia
- Height: 1.85 m (6 ft 1 in)
- Spouse: Cherie

Career
- Sport: Golf
- Turned professional: 1993
- Current tour: PGA Tour of Australasia
- Former tours: PGA Tour; Nationwide Tour
- Professional wins: 4

Number of wins by tour
- PGA Tour of Australasia: 1
- Korn Ferry Tour: 3

Best results in major championships
- Masters Tournament: DNP
- PGA Championship: DNP
- U.S. Open: CUT: 2000, 2002
- The Open Championship: DNP

Paul Gow (born 10 November 1970) is an Australian professional golfer.

== Career ==
In 1970, Gow was born in Sydney, Australia. In 1993, he turned professional.

Gow has won three times on the developmental tour: in 1997, in 2000, and in 2006. He has never won on the PGA Tour but he did come close when he lost in a playoff to Jeff Sluman at the 2001 B.C. Open.

Gow is 0-for-3 in playoffs on the developmental tour all of which were lost during the 2004 season; he finished 11th on the final money list.

== Professional wins (4) ==
=== PGA Tour of Australasia wins (1) ===
No.	Date	Tournament	Winning score	Margin of victory	Runner-up
1	20 Feb 2000	Canon Challenge	−16 (68-68-67-69=272)	1 stroke	(Australia) Kenny Druce

=== Nationwide Tour wins (3) ===
No.	Date	Tournament	Winning score	Margin of victory	Runner-up
1	24 Aug 1997	Nike Permian Basin Open	−21 (68-69-65-65=267)	2 strokes	(United States) Steve Lamontagne
2	9 Jul 2000	Buy.com Hershey Open	−3 (72-68-70-71=281)	1 stroke	(United States) Paul Claxton
3	23 Apr 2006	Athens Regional Foundation Classic	−21 (64-67-67-69=267)	3 strokes	(South Africa) Craig Lile

Nationwide Tour playoff record (0–3)

No.	Year	Tournament	Opponent(s)	Result
1	2004	BMW Charity Pro-Am	(Japan) Ryuji Imada	Lost to birdie on fifth extra hole
2	2004	SAS Carolina Classic	(United States) Chris Anderson, (United States) Jason Buha, (Australia) Brendan Jones	Anderson won with par on eighth extra hole Buha and Gow eliminated by birdie on first hole
3	2004	Reese's Cup Classic	(United States) Ben Bates	Lost to par on eighth extra hole

== Playoff record ==
PGA Tour playoff record (0–1)

No.	Year	Tournament	Opponent	Result
1	2001	B.C. Open	(United States) Jeff Sluman	Lost to birdie on second extra hole

== Results in major championships ==
Tournament	2000	2001	2002
U.S. Open	CUT		CUT

Did not play

CUT = missed the half-way cut
Note: Gow only played in the U.S. Open.

== Team appearances ==
Amateur

- Australian Men's Interstate Teams Matches (representing New South Wales): 1989 (winners), 1990 (winners), 1991 (winners), 1992 (winners), 1993

Professional

- World Cup (representing Australia): 1999

== Media career ==
Gow joined Fox Sports following his retirement from playing becoming the host of The Golf Show, On Par with Paul Gow, Your Golf Show, Tour the Greens, Getting A Round In, and How Good Is Golf with co-host Bree Laughlin.

== See also ==
- 2000 Buy.com Tour graduates
- 2004 Nationwide Tour graduates
- 2006 PGA Tour Qualifying School graduates
