= Jeff Gallagher =

American professional golfer

Personal information
- Full name: Jeffrey Gallagher
- Nationality: United States
- Born: December 29, 1964 (age 61) Marion, Indiana, U.S.
- Height: 6 ft 0 in (1.83 m)
- Weight: 185 lb (84 kg; 13.2 st)

Career
- Sport: Golf
- College: Ball State University
- Turned professional: 1987
- Former tours: PGA Tour; Nationwide Tour; Champions Tour
- Professional wins: 2

Number of wins by tour
- Korn Ferry Tour: 2

Best results in major championships
- Masters Tournament: DNP
- PGA Championship: DNP
- U.S. Open: CUT: 1999
- The Open Championship: DNP

Jeffrey Gallagher (born December 29, 1964) is an American professional golfer who played on the PGA Tour and the Nationwide Tour.

== Early life ==
Gallagher is the younger brother of five-time PGA Tour winner Jim Gallagher Jr. and LPGA Tour golfer Jackie Gallagher-Smith.

== Professional career ==
Gallagher has won twice on the Nationwide Tour, once in 1991 at the Ben Hogan Cleveland Open and another in 2000 at the BUY.COM South Carolina Classic. He nearly won again at the 2009 Rex Hospital Open when he lost in a one-hole playoff to Kevin Johnson after Johnson birdied the first playoff hole, while Gallagher parred it.

== Professional wins (2) ==
=== Nationwide Tour wins (2) ===
No.	Date	Tournament	Winning score	Margin of victory	Runners-up
1	Jun 9, 1991	Ben Hogan Cleveland Open	−15 (65-66-70=201)	1 stroke	(United States) Tom Lehman, (United States) Doug Martin
2	Apr 30, 2000	Buy.com South Carolina Classic	−10 (70-68-71-69=278)	1 stroke	(United States) Lee Porter, (United States) Chris Smith, (United States) Brett Quigley

Nationwide Tour playoff record (0–1)

No.	Year	Tournament	Opponent	Result
1	2009	Rex Hospital Open	(United States) Kevin Johnson	Lost to birdie on first extra hole

== Results in major championships ==
Tournament	1999
U.S. Open	CUT

CUT = missed the halfway cut
Note: Reese only played in the U.S. Open.

== See also ==
- 1995 PGA Tour Qualifying School graduates
- 1997 PGA Tour Qualifying School graduates
- 2000 Buy.com Tour graduates
