= TaylorMade Pebble Beach Invitational =

Tournament information
- Location: Pebble Beach, California
- Established: 1972
- Course: Pebble Beach Golf Links
- Par: 72
- Length: 6,816 yards (6,233 m)
- Format: Stroke play
- Prize fund: US$300,000
- Month played: November

Tournament record score
- Aggregate: 267 Brandon Harkins (2021)
- To par: −21 as above

Current champion
- (United States) Mina Harigae

Final champion
- Location in the United States Location in California

The TaylorMade Golf Pebble Beach Invitational is a non-tour professional golf tournament. The event debuted in 1972. The 2019 purse was $300,000 with $60,000 going to the individual winner. There is also a team competition. Professionals from the PGA Tour, LPGA Tour, PGA Tour Champions, and Korn Ferry Tour all compete against each other. Tee placements vary for each tour, based on average driving distances. The event takes place in November of each year.

== Winners ==
Year	Winner	Score	To par	Margin of victory	Runner(s)-up	Ref.
TaylorMade Pebble Beach Invitational
2025	(United States) Mina Harigae	274	−14	3 strokes	(United States) John Mallinger (United States) Cameron Sisk	
2024	(United States) Max McGreevy	275	−13	4 strokes	(United States) Brooke Matthews (United States) William Mouw	
2023	(United States) R. J. Manke	270	−18	3 strokes	(United States) Rico Hoey	
2022	(United States) Parker Coody	270	−18	3 strokes	(United States) Lauren Stephenson	
2021	(United States) Brandon Harkins	267	−21	2 strokes	(Germany) Alex Čejka (England) Harry Hall	
2020	(United States) Kyle Reifers	275	−13	3 strokes	(United States) Kirk Triplett	
2019	(United States) Kevin Sutherland (2)	276	−12	3 strokes	(United States) Martin Flores	
2018	(United States) Tom Pernice Jr.	274	−14	2 strokes	(United States) Mina Harigae (United States) Rob Oppenheim	
2017	(United States) Duffy Waldorf	281	−7	1 stroke	(United States) Sam Burns (United States) Tom Pernice Jr. (United States) Kevin Sutherland	
2016	(United States) Scott McCarron	278	−10	1 stroke	(United States) Kevin Sutherland	
2015	(United States) Jeff Gove	273	−15	2 strokes	(United States) Kevin Sutherland (United States) Duffy Waldorf	
Callaway Pebble Beach Invitational
2014	(United States) Tommy Armour III (3)	274	−14	Playoff	(United States) Lee Janzen	
2013	(United States) Kevin Kisner	275	−13	1 stroke	(United States) Chesson Hadley	
2012	(United States) Tommy Gainey	277	−11	1 stroke	(United States) William McGirt (United States) Kirk Triplett	
2011	(United States) Harrison Frazar	279	−9	1 stroke	(United States) Matt Bettencourt (United States) Cameron Tringale	
Callaway Golf Pebble Beach Invitational
2010	(United States) John Mallinger	273	−15	2 strokes	(United States) Jason Gore	
2009	(United States) Mark Brooks (3)	276	−12	2 strokes	(United States) Rickie Fowler (United States) D. A. Points	
2008	(United States) Tommy Armour III (2)	278	−10	Playoff	(United States) Brock Mackenzie (United States) Scott Simpson	
2007	(United States) Tommy Armour III	272	−16	2 strokes	(United States) Ronnie Black (United States) Rocco Mediate	
2006	(United States) Jason Bohn	274	−14	1 stroke	(United States) Scott Simpson	
2005	(United States) Nick Watney	270	−18	1 stroke	(United States) Peter Tomasulo	
2004	(United States) Jeff Brehaut	279	−9	1 stroke	(United States) Kevin Sutherland	
2003	(United States) John Daly	279	−9	1 stroke	(United States) Jim Thorpe (United States) Bo Van Pelt	
2002	(United States) Mark Brooks (2)	272	−16	3 strokes	(United States) Jeff Gove	
2001	(United States) Olin Browne	271	−17	Playoff	(United States) Todd Barrangen	
2000	(United States) Kevin Sutherland	275	−13	1 stroke	(United States) Don Pooley	
1999	(United States) Rocco Mediate	282	−6	1 stroke	(Sweden) Annika Sörenstam	
1998	(United States) Tom Lehman	273	−15	2 strokes	(United States) Rocco Mediate (United States) Kirk Triplett	
1997	(United States) Loren Roberts (2)	276	−12	3 strokes	(United States) Johnny Miller (United States) Kirk Triplett	
Merrill Lynch Pebble Beach Invitational
1996	(United States) Kirk Triplett	274	−14	3 strokes	(United States) David Ogrin	
Pebble Beach Invitational
1995	(United States) Ronnie Black	277	−11	2 strokes	(United States) Bob Ford (United States) Kenny Perry (United States) Kirk Triplett (United States) Kris Tschetter	
1994	(United States) Robert Gamez	277	−11	6 strokes	(United States) Kirk Triplett	
1993 (Nov)	(United States) Bruce Fleisher	283	−5	Playoff	(United States) Todd Fischer	
1993 (Jan)	(United States) Mark Brooks	208 (Note: Shortened to 54 holes due to rain.)	−8	5 strokes	(United States) Bob May	
Ben Hogan Pebble Beach Invitational
1992	(United States) Loren Roberts	281	−7	2 strokes	(United States) Mike Reid	
Spalding Invitational
1991: No tournament
1990	(United States) Juli Inkster	284	−4	1 stroke	(United States) Mark Brooks	
1989 (Dec)	(United States) Mark Calcavecchia	276	−10	2 strokes	(Canada) Dave Barr (United States) Bill Glasson	
1989 (Jan)	(United States) Bob Gilder	276	−8	2 strokes	(United States) Rob Boldt	
1988	(United States) Lennie Clements	271	−12	Playoff	(United States) Ken Green (United States) Tim Norris (United States) Dan Pohl	
1987	(United States) Ken Green	274	−14	1 stroke	(United States) Don Pooley (United States) Willie Wood	
1986	(United States) Tim Norris	272	−16	3 strokes	(United States) Mark Brooks (United States) Dan Forsman	
1985	(England) Peter Oosterhuis (2)	274	−14	4 strokes	(United States) Johnny Miller	
1984: No tournament
1983 (Dec)	(United States) Johnny Miller	270	−17	5 strokes	(United States) Bob Gilder	
1983 (Jan)	(England) Peter Oosterhuis	277	−11	1 stroke	(United States) Jay Haas	
1982	(United States) Jay Haas	337	−22	4 strokes	(United States) Bobby Clampett	
1981	(United States) John Mahaffey	279	−9	1 stroke	(United States) Buddy Allin	
1980	(United States) Bobby Clampett (a)	272	−16	2 strokes	(United States) Mike Reid	
1979	(United States) Al Geiberger (2)	276	−9	Playoff	(United States) George Bayer (United States) Bobby Clampett (a)	
1979	(United States) Al Geiberger	276	−9	Playoff	(United States) George Bayer (United States) Bobby Clampett (a)	
1978: No tournament
1977	(United States) Rod Funseth (2)	271	−14	5 strokes	(United States) George Cadle	
1976 (Dec)	(United States) Mark Pfeil	212	−4	1 stroke	(United States) Ron Cerrudo (United States) Rod Funseth	
Lynx Invitational
1976 (Jan)	(United States) David Glenz	277	−8	5 strokes	(United States) Bob Risch	
Confidence Open
1975	(United States) Forrest Fezler	276	−10	2 strokes	(United States) Bob Risch	
1974: No tournament
1973	(United States) Rod Funseth	272	−12	Playoff	(Australia) Bob Stanton	
Hyatt Invitational
1972	(United States) Rafe Botts	279	−5	2 strokes	(United States) Jim Wiechers	
