= 2000 Buy.com Tour graduates =

This is a list of players who graduated from the Buy.com Tour in 2000. The top 15 players on the Buy.com Tour's money list in 2000 earned their PGA Tour card for 2001.

	2000 Buy.com Tour		2001 PGA Tour				
Player	Money list rank	Earnings ($)	Starts	Cuts made	Best finish	Money list rank	Earnings ($)
(United States) Spike McRoy	1	300,638	31	16	T3	127	401,654
(Australia) Mark Hensby*	2	291,757	29	7	T9	186	155,629
(South Africa) Tim Clark*	3	288,056	3	1	T26	227	21,750
(United States) Briny Baird	4	271,897	31	22	2	63	812,001
(Canada) Ian Leggatt*	5	259,724	29	12	T5	133	368,862
(United States) Chris Smith	6	236,541	30	20	T3	58	932,810
(United States) Kent Jones	7	220,081	28	7	T15	201	87,308
(United States) Tripp Isenhour*	8	219,630	31	16	T7	146	299,452
(Australia) Paul Gow*	9	209,449	27	12	2	83	608,382
(United States) John Riegger	10	200,904	27	17	14	140	342,221
(United States) David Berganio Jr.	11	175,947	25	16	T3	76	685,082
(United States) Jeff Gallagher	12	193,811	7	4	T48	228	20,984
(United States) J. J. Henry*	13	192,287	28	15	2/T2 (twice)	49	1,073,847
(United States) Kelly Grunewald*	14	192,225	27	6	T34	210	59,244
(United States) Jeff Hart	15	178,489	28	16	T11	164	219,386

*PGA Tour rookie for 2001.
T = Tied
Green background indicates the player retained his PGA Tour card for 2002 (finished inside the top 125).
Yellow background indicates player did not retain his PGA Tour card for 2002, but retained conditional status (finished between 126–150).
Red background indicates the player did not retain his PGA Tour card for 2002 (finished outside the top 150).

== Runners-up on the PGA Tour in 2001 ==
No.	Date	Player	Tournament	Winner	Winning score	Runner-up score
1	May 27	(United States) J. J. Henry	Kemper Insurance Open	(United States) Frank Lickliter	−16 (69-65-66-68=268)	−15 (65-71-67-66=269)
2	Jul 22	(Australia) Paul Gow lost in two-man playoff	B.C. Open	(United States) Jeff Sluman	−22 (67-68-65-66=266)	−22 (69-65-66-66=266)
3	Jul 29	(United States) Briny Baird	John Deere Classic	(United States) David Gossett	−19 (67-64-68-66=265)	−18 (69-65-66-66=266)
4	Sep 30	(United States) J. J. Henry	Texas Open at LaCantera	(United States) Justin Leonard	−18 (65-64-68-69=266)	−16 (70-64-68-66=268)

== See also ==
- 2000 PGA Tour Qualifying School graduates
