= The Reese's Cup Classic =

Golf tournament

Reese's Cup Classic
Tournament information
- Location: Hershey, Pennsylvania
- Established: 1997
- Course: Hershey Country Club
- Par: 71
- Length: 7,154 yards (6,542 m)
- Tour: Nationwide Tour
- Format: Stroke play
- Prize fund: US$450,000
- Month played: July
- Final year: 2004

Tournament record score
- Aggregate: 273 Michael Clark II (1998); 273 Rod Pampling (2001); 273 John Rollins (2001)
- To par: −11 as above

Final champion
- (United States) Ben Bates
- Location in the United States Location in Pennsylvania

The Reese's Cup Classic was a golf tournament on the Nationwide Tour from 1997 to 2004. It was played at the Hershey Country Club, East Course, in Hershey, Pennsylvania. It was played as the Hershey Open from 1997 to 2002.

== Winners ==
Year	Winner	Score	To par	Margin of victory	Runner(s)-up	Ref
Reese's Cup Classic
2004	(United States) Ben Bates	278	−6	Playoff	(Australia) Paul Gow	
2003	(United States) Joe Ogilvie	274	−10	3 strokes	(United States) Paul Claxton (United States) Zach Johnson (Australia) David McKenzie (United States) Wes Short Jr.	
Hershey Open
2002	(United States) Cliff Kresge	276	−8	Playoff	(United States) Brian Claar (United States) Steve Ford (United States) Joel Kribel	
Buy.com Hershey Open
2001	(United States) John Rollins	273	−11	Playoff	(Australia) Rod Pampling	
2000	(Australia) Paul Gow	281	−3	1 stroke	(United States) Paul Claxton	
Nike Hershey Open
1999	(England) Ed Fryatt	275	−5	3 strokes	(United States) Brett Wayment	
1998	(United States) Michael Clark II	273	−11	2 strokes	(United States) Bob Burns	
1997	(United States) Barry Cheesman	278	−6	1 stroke	(United States) Greg Lesher (United States) Billy Downes	
