= 1994 Nike Tour graduates =

This is a list of players who graduated from the Nike Tour in 1994. The top ten players on the Nike Tour's money list in 1994 earned their PGA Tour card for 1995.

	1994 Nike Tour		1995 PGA Tour				
Player	Money list rank	Earnings ($)	Starts	Cuts made	Best finish	Money list rank	Earnings ($)
(United States) Chris Perry	1	167,148	30	17	T12 (twice)	150	113,632
(United States) Scott Gump	2	161,035	29	19	T10	99	184,828
(United States) Pat Bates*	3	155,469	31	9	T18	206	48,049
(United States) Jim Carter	4	142,750	30	19	T3	102	180,664
(United States) Skip Kendall	5	131,067	31	18	T7	164	93,606
(United States) Bruce Vaughan*	6	129,617	30	15	T22	173	77,561
(United States) Tommy Armour III	7	126,620	30	16	T7	141	134,407
(United States) David Duval*	8	126,430	26	20	2/T2 (thrice)	11	881,436
(United States) Jerry Haas	9	116,583	29	14	T18 (twice)	171	78,769
(United States) Emlyn Aubrey	10	113,919	30	15	T9	140	137,020

*PGA Tour rookie for 1995.

T = Tied
Green background indicates the player retained his PGA Tour card for 1996 (finished inside the top 125).
Yellow background indicates player did not retain his PGA Tour card for 1996, but retained conditional status (finished between 126 and 150).
Red background indicates the player did not retain his PGA Tour card for 1996 (finished outside the top 150).

== Runners-up on the PGA Tour in 1995 ==
No.	Date	Player	Tournament	Winner	Winning score	Runner-up score
1	Feb 5	(United States) David Duval	AT&T Pebble Beach National Pro-Am	(United States) Peter Jacobsen	−17 (67-73-66-65=271)	−15 (72-67-67-67=273)
2	Feb 19	(United States) David Duval	Bob Hope Chrysler Classic	(United States) Kenny Perry	−25 (63-71-64-67-70=335)	−24 (67-68-65-67-69=336)
3	Jun 4	(United States) David Duval	Memorial Tournament	(Australia) Greg Norman	−19 (66-70-67-66=269)	−15 (70-71-64-68=273)

== See also ==
- 1994 PGA Tour Qualifying School graduates
