= David Duval =

American professional golfer (born 1971)

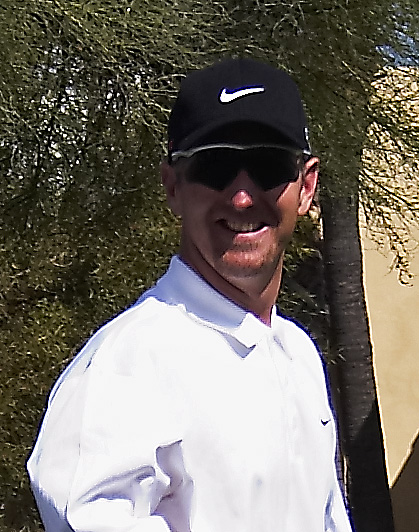

Personal information
- Full name: David Robert Duval
- Nicknames: Double D, DD
- Nationality: United States
- Born: November 9, 1971 (age 55) Jacksonville, Florida, U.S.
- Height: 6 ft 0 in (1.83 m)
- Weight: 180 lb (82 kg; 13 st)
- Spouse: Suzanne Persichitte (m. 2004)
- Children: 2

Career
- Sport: Golf
- College: Georgia Institute of Technology
- Turned professional: 1993
- Current tour: PGA Tour Champions
- Former tours: PGA Tour; Nike Tour
- Professional wins: 20
- Highest ranking: 1 (March 28, 1999) (15 weeks)

Number of wins by tour
- PGA Tour: 13
- European Tour: 1
- Japan Golf Tour: 1
- Korn Ferry Tour: 2
- Other: 4

Best results in major championships (wins: 1)
- Masters Tournament: 2nd/T2: 1998, 2001
- PGA Championship: T10: 1999, 2001
- U.S. Open: T2: 2009
- The Open Championship: Won: 2001

Achievements and awards
- Haskins Award: 1993
- Jack Nicklaus Award: 1993
- PGA Tour money list winner: 1998
- Byron Nelson Award: 1998
- Vardon Trophy: 1998
- Georgia Tech Athletics Hall of Fame: 2003

David Robert Duval (born November 9, 1971) is an American professional golfer who competed on the PGA Tour and currently plays on the PGA Tour Champions. He is a former world number one in the Official World Golf Ranking. Duval won 13 PGA Tour tournaments between 1997 and 2001, including one major championship, the 2001 Open Championship.

Duval attended Georgia Tech, where he was a two-time ACC Player of the Year and the 1993 National Player of the Year. After playing two years on the Nike Tour, where he won twice, he received his PGA Tour card in 1995. Between 1997 and 2000, Duval finished all four seasons top-5 on the PGA Tour's money list, including being the leading money winner and scoring leader in 1998. In addition to his major title, he also won the 1997 Tour Championship and the 1999 Players Championship.

Following Duval's victory at the 2001 Open Championship, he never won again on the PGA Tour and his performance declined dramatically due to injuries and various medical conditions. As a result, he lost his tour card in 2011. After his professional golf career slowed, he became a golf analyst. He began competing on the Champions Tour in 2022.

== Early life ==
Duval was born in Jacksonville, Florida, the son of golf instructor and club professional Bob Duval and Diane Poole Duval, a member of the FSU Flying High Circus during college. His brother Brent was two years older, and sister Deirdre was five years younger. During his early years, his father was club professional at Timuquana Country Club, where he learned to play golf under his father's guidance.

When David was nine, his brother Brent developed aplastic anemia. The family sought treatment at Rainbow Babies & Children's Hospital in Cleveland, Ohio, where David underwent surgery to donate bone marrow. The transplant was not successful, and Brent died as a result of sepsis on May 17, 1981 at age 12. Bob Duval was unable to cope, and moved out of the family home for a year. Counseling enabled him to reunite with his wife and children in 1982, and David continued to receive golf instruction from his father. In 1993, just as Duval was starting his professional golf career, his father again moved out of the family home, this time permanently.

== Amateur career ==
He graduated from the Episcopal High School of Jacksonville in 1989, the same year he was the U.S. Junior Amateur champion. He continued his amateur career for the Georgia Tech Yellow Jackets men's golf team, where he was a four-time first-team All-American, two-time ACC Player of the Year, and 1993 National Player of the Year.

While in college, Duval held a two-stroke lead after 54 holes in an official PGA Tour event, the 1992 BellSouth Classic. He shot a final-round 79 to finish tied-13th.

== Professional career ==
=== Early success ===
After two years on the Nike Tour where he won twice, he earned his PGA Tour card in 1995. Success came quickly, as Duval posted seven second-place finishes on the PGA Tour from 1995 to 1997, qualifying for the 1996 Presidents Cup and posting a 4–0–0 record for the victorious American team. But a PGA Tour victory eluded him until he won the Michelob Championship at Kingsmill in October 1997. He won his next two tournaments, including the season-ending Tour Championship.

The following season, in 1998, Duval won four tournaments and led the PGA Tour money list. He also won the Vardon Trophy and Byron Nelson Award for lowest scoring average.

Early in 1999, he achieved the number one spot in the Official World Golf Ranking and shot a 59 in the final round of the 1999 Bob Hope Chrysler Classic on the Palmer Course at PGA West in La Quinta, California. Duval made an eagle on the final hole to win the tournament by one shot. Before 1999, only two other golfers in PGA Tour history, Al Geiberger and Chip Beck, had posted a 59 in competition and no one had ever done so in a final round. Later, in the spring, he won the 1999 Players Championship. When he won the Players Championship he became the first player in history to win on the same day as his father, Bob Duval, who won a Champions Tour event that same day. He also played on the victorious 1999 Ryder Cup team. He finished the season second on the money list only behind Tiger Woods.

The following season, in 2000, he won the Buick Challenge and finished in the top ten of the money list. The following year he won the 2001 Open Championship. Duval's winning speech was welcomed by British commentators as "delightfully modest and heartfelt". He also won the Dunlop Phoenix Tournament, an event on the Japan Golf Tour, at the end of the year.

=== Struggles ===
After his Open Championship win, Duval entered a downward spiral in form that saw him drop to 80th on the money list in 2002 and 211th in 2003, prompting an extended break from the game. Numerous reasons have been postulated for the decline, including back, wrist and shoulder problems, personal difficulties and a form of vertigo. Duval has not won a tournament on the PGA Tour since his Open Championship victory in 2001. His last worldwide win was the Dunlop Phoenix Tournament in November 2001 on his 30th birthday. His 30s proved to be much less lucrative on the golf course.

Many commentators believed Duval's career to be over but he returned to golf at the U.S. Open in 2004, where he shot 25 over par and missed the cut. Duval struggled with his best results until 2009 being a T-13 at the Deutsche Bank Championship in 2004 and a T-16 at the U.S. Open in 2006. He made the cut in only one PGA Tour event in 2005 but did finish in the top ten at the Dunlop Phoenix tournament in Japan.

=== Comeback attempts ===
Duval had a successful start to the 2006 season, making the cut in his first two tournaments, as well as a very respectable finish of T-16 at the U.S. Open at Winged Foot Golf Club, where his second round 68 was good enough for a tie as the best round of the tournament. Despite not reaching the same heights in the remaining two majors of the year, his performances continued a general upward trend, with none of the rounds of 80+ that had become so familiar in the previous years.

After a steady start to 2007 during the West Coast Swing, Duval once again disappeared from the tour. His mother died on July 17, and he later revealed that his wife was going through a difficult pregnancy. This prompted the PGA Tour to amend its medical exemption policies – and Duval was granted twenty starts for the next season.

After a lackluster first half of the following year, Duval reappeared on the leaderboard of the 2008 Open Championship, rekindling memories of his major victory. He shot 73-69-83-71 for the week and finished T-39.

In 2009, Duval used his final career money exemption on the PGA Tour. He made his first cut at the AT&T Pebble Beach National Pro-Am in February. However, he stormed back onto the golf scene with a T-2 finish at the U.S. Open at Bethpage Black. After going through sectional qualifying, Duval made the most of his first appearance in the U.S. Open since 2006. Going into the final round, Duval was four shots behind eventual winner Lucas Glover. Duval made a triple bogey at the par three 3rd hole, but rebounded with three straight birdies from 14 to 16. He stood on the tee of the 71st hole in a tie for the lead, but his par putt lipped out on the hole, and he finished tied for second, two shots behind Glover. It was his best finish on tour since the 2002 Memorial Tournament. After the Open, Duval jumped 740 spots in the Official World Golf Ranking from 882 to 142.

Duval failed to earn his PGA Tour card for the 2010 season, so he had to play on sponsor's exemptions. He showed more signs of a comeback by shooting a final-round 69 to finish 2nd to defending champion Dustin Johnson at the 2010 AT&T Pebble Beach National Pro-Am. Duval had a good 2010 season and retained his tour card at the end of the year.

The 2011 season was a struggle for Duval, when he made only nine cuts in 24 events and lost his Tour card after finishing outside 150th on the tour money list. He went to Q School in an attempt to regain his tour card, but finished T72 in the final round. For 2012, Duval had past champion status. After seven unsuccessful starts, Duval made his first cut of the season at the Valero Texas Open, and finished T60. It was announced on June 13 that he would be an analyst for ESPN for the first two rounds of the U.S. Open, having failed to qualify for the 2nd major of the season.

In December 2013, Duval announced via his Twitter that the 2014 PGA Tour season would be the last season he would ask for sponsor exemptions to get into tournament fields. Many people took this as a possible retirement announcement, but Duval clarified to say that he wants to earn his way back on the Tour rather than depending on others. In April 2014, Duval finished tied for 25th (−8) at the Zurich Classic of New Orleans.

In 2018, U.S. captain Jim Furyk named Duval as a non-playing vice-captain for the U.S. team participating in the 2018 Ryder Cup. The U.S. team lost to Europe by 17½ points to 10½.

=== PGA Tour Champions ===
After turning 50 in 2021 and gaining eligibility, Duval began playing on the PGA Tour Champions circuit in 2022.

== Broadcasting ==
In addition to playing in tournaments, Duval has become a TV golf commentator. From 2012 through 2014, he helped commentate The Open Championship and U.S. Open for ESPN. In 2015, Duval joined the Golf Channel as a studio analyst. Since 2020, Duval has served as the lead analyst for ESPN's coverage of the PGA Championship.

== Personal life ==
Duval split with his girlfriend Julie McArthur in early 2002 after being together for eight years.

Duval and his wife Suzanne (née Persichitte) met at a Denver restaurant in August 2003 while Duval was in the city for The International, a nearby PGA Tour event. They married seven months later. They have two children together. She has custody of her three older children from a prior marriage. Their home is in Cherry Hills Village, Colorado, a suburb south of Denver.

According to a 2004 article in the Orlando Sentinel, Duval "was one of those life-long Republicans until a couple of years ago when he re-registered and became a Democrat." This made him one of the few Democrats on the PGA Tour. He said of the invasion of Iraq: "I don't think it's always right to force our belief system on other people." In a 2006 interview with Bob Verdi, Duval stated he voted for John Kerry in the 2004 presidential election. He added: "I am socially a Democrat ... But I am fiscally a Republican."

== Amateur wins ==
this list may be incomplete

- 1989 U.S. Junior Amateur, AJGA Tournament of Champions
- 1992 Northeast Amateur, Porter Cup

== Professional wins (20) ==
=== PGA Tour wins (13) ===
Legend
Major championships (1)
Players Championships (1)
Tour Championships (1)
Other PGA Tour (10)

| No. | Date | Tournament | Winning score | Margin of victory | Runner(s)-up |
|---|---|---|---|---|---|
| 1 | Oct 12, 1997 | Michelob Championship at Kingsmill | −13 (67-66-71-67=271) | Playoff | (New Zealand) Grant Waite, (United States) Duffy Waldorf |
| 2 | Oct 19, 1997 | Walt Disney World/Oldsmobile Classic | −18 (65-70-65-70=270) | Playoff | (United States) Dan Forsman |
| 3 | Nov 2, 1997 | The Tour Championship | −11 (66-69-70-68=273) | 1 stroke | (United States) Jim Furyk |
| 4 | Feb 22, 1998 | Tucson Chrysler Classic | −19 (66-62-68-73=269) | 4 strokes | (United States) Justin Leonard, (United States) David Toms |
| 5 | May 3, 1998 | Shell Houston Open | −12 (69-70-73-64=276) | 1 stroke | (United States) Jeff Maggert |
| 6 | Aug 30, 1998 | NEC World Series of Golf | −11 (69-66-66-68=269) | 2 strokes | (United States) Phil Mickelson |
| 7 | Oct 11, 1998 | Michelob Championship at Kingsmill (2) | −16 (65-67-68-68=268) | 3 strokes | (New Zealand) Phil Tataurangi |
| 8 | Jan 10, 1999 | Mercedes Championships | −26 (67-63-68-68=266) | 9 strokes | (United States) Billy Mayfair, (United States) Mark O'Meara |
| 9 | Jan 24, 1999 | Bob Hope Chrysler Classic | −26 (70-71-64-70-59=334) | 1 stroke | (United States) Steve Pate |
| 10 | Mar 28, 1999 | The Players Championship | −3 (69-69-74-73=285) | 2 strokes | (United States) Scott Gump |
| 11 | Apr 4, 1999 | BellSouth Classic | −18 (66-69-68-67=270) | 2 strokes | (United States) Stewart Cink |
| 12 | Oct 1, 2000 | Buick Challenge | −19 (68-69-67-65=269) | 2 strokes | (United States) Jeff Maggert, (Zimbabwe) Nick Price |
| 13 | Jul 22, 2001 | The Open Championship | −10 (69-73-65-67=274) | 3 strokes | (Sweden) Niclas Fasth |

PGA Tour playoff record (2–2)

| No. | Year | Tournament | Opponent(s) | Result |
|---|---|---|---|---|
| 1 | 1997 | Michelob Championship at Kingsmill | (New Zealand) Grant Waite, (United States) Duffy Waldorf | Won with birdie on first extra hole |
| 2 | 1997 | Walt Disney World/Oldsmobile Classic | (United States) Dan Forsman | Won with par on first extra hole |
| 3 | 2000 | Buick Classic | (United States) Dennis Paulson | Lost to par on fourth extra hole |
| 4 | 2001 | Buick Challenge | (United States) Chris DiMarco | Lost to par on first extra hole |

=== Japan Golf Tour wins (1) ===
| No. | Date | Tournament | Winning score | Margin of victory | Runner-up |
|---|---|---|---|---|---|
| 1 | Nov 11, 2001 | Dunlop Phoenix Tournament | −15 (65-67-68-69=269) | Playoff | (Japan) Taichi Teshima |

Japan Golf Tour playoff record (1–0)

| No. | Year | Tournament | Opponent | Result |
|---|---|---|---|---|
| 1 | 2001 | Dunlop Phoenix Tournament | (Japan) Taichi Teshima | Won with birdie on first extra hole |

=== Nike Tour wins (2) ===
Legend
Tour Championships (1)
Other Nike Tour (0)

| No. | Date | Tournament | Winning score | Margin of victory | Runner(s)-up |
|---|---|---|---|---|---|
| 1 | Aug 22, 1993 | Nike Wichita Open | −17 (62-70-69-70=271) | 1 stroke | (United States) Jeff Lee, (United States) John Morse |
| 2 | Oct 17, 1993 | Nike Tour Championship | −7 (69-68-72-68=277) | 1 stroke | (United States) Danny Briggs |

=== Other wins (4) ===
Legend
World Golf Championships (1)
Other wins (3)

| No. | Date | Tournament | Winning score | Margin of victory | Runners-up |
|---|---|---|---|---|---|
| 1 | Aug 25, 1998 | Fred Meyer Challenge (with (United States) Jim Furyk) | −18 (65-61=126) | 4 strokes | (Australia) Steve Elkington and (United States) Craig Stadler, (United States) Scott McCarron and (United States) Paul Stankowski |
| 2 | Nov 14, 1999 | Franklin Templeton Shark Shootout (with (United States) Fred Couples) | −32 (61-62-61=184) | 6 strokes | (United States) Scott Hoch and (United States) Scott McCarron |
| 3 | Dec 10, 2000 | WGC-World Cup (with (United States) Tiger Woods) | −34 (61-65-60-68=254) | 3 strokes | Argentina − Ángel Cabrera and Eduardo Romero |
| 4 | Dec 11, 2016 | PNC Father-Son Challenge (with stepson Nick Karavites) | −21 (61-62=123) | 1 stroke | (United States) Stewart Cink and son Connor Cink |

Other playoff record (0–1)

| No. | Year | Tournament | Opponents | Result |
|---|---|---|---|---|
| 1 | 2001 | WGC-World Cup (with (United States) Tiger Woods) | Denmark − Thomas Bjørn and Søren Hansen, New Zealand − Michael Campbell and David Smail, South Africa − Retief Goosen and Ernie Els | South Africa won with par on second extra hole New Zealand and United States eliminated by birdie on first hole |

== Major championships ==
=== Wins (1) ===
| Year | Championship | 54 holes | Winning score | Margin | Runner-up |
|---|---|---|---|---|---|
| 2001 | The Open Championship | Tied for lead | −10 (69-73-65-67=274) | 3 strokes | (Sweden) Niclas Fasth |

=== Results timeline ===
Results not in chronological order in 2020.

| Tournament | 1990 | 1991 | 1992 | 1993 | 1994 | 1995 | 1996 | 1997 | 1998 | 1999 |
|---|---|---|---|---|---|---|---|---|---|---|
| Masters Tournament | | | | | | | T18 | CUT | T2 | T6 |
| U.S. Open | T56 | | CUT | | | T28 | T67 | T48 | T7 | T7 |
| The Open Championship | | | | | | T20 | T14 | T33 | T11 | T62 |
| PGA Championship | | | | | | CUT | T41 | T13 | CUT | T10 |

| Tournament | 2000 | 2001 | 2002 | 2003 | 2004 | 2005 | 2006 | 2007 | 2008 | 2009 |
|---|---|---|---|---|---|---|---|---|---|---|
| Masters Tournament | T3 | 2 | CUT | CUT | | CUT | CUT | | | |
| U.S. Open | T8 | T16 | CUT | CUT | CUT | CUT | T16 | | | T2 |
| The Open Championship | T11 | 1 | T22 | CUT | | CUT | T56 | | T39 | CUT |
| PGA Championship | | T10 | T34 | WD | CUT | CUT | CUT | | | |

| Tournament | 2010 | 2011 | 2012 | 2013 | 2014 | 2015 | 2016 | 2017 | 2018 |
|---|---|---|---|---|---|---|---|---|---|
| Masters Tournament | CUT | | | | | | | | |
| U.S. Open | T70 | | | | | | | | |
| The Open Championship | CUT | CUT | CUT | CUT | CUT | T49 | WD | CUT | WD |
| PGA Championship | | | | | | | | | |

| Tournament | 2019 | 2020 | 2021 | 2022 | 2023 | 2024 | 2025 | 2026 |
|---|---|---|---|---|---|---|---|---|
| Masters Tournament | | | | | | | | |
| PGA Championship | | | | | | | | |
| U.S. Open | | | | | | | | |
| The Open Championship | CUT | NT | | CUT | | | | CUT |

Win
Top 10
Did not play

WD = Withdrew
CUT = missed the half-way cut
"T" indicates a tie for a place
NT = No tournament due to COVID-19 pandemic

=== Summary ===
| Tournament | Wins | 2nd | 3rd | Top-5 | Top-10 | Top-25 | Events | Cuts made |
|---|---|---|---|---|---|---|---|---|
| Masters Tournament | 0 | 2 | 1 | 3 | 4 | 5 | 11 | 5 |
| PGA Championship | 0 | 0 | 0 | 0 | 2 | 3 | 11 | 5 |
| U.S. Open | 0 | 1 | 0 | 1 | 4 | 6 | 16 | 11 |
| The Open Championship | 1 | 0 | 0 | 1 | 1 | 6 | 25 | 12 |
| Totals | 1 | 3 | 1 | 5 | 11 | 20 | 63 | 33 |

- Most consecutive cuts made – 11 (1999 Masters – 2001 PGA)
- Longest streak of top-10s – 3 (1999 PGA – 2000 U.S. Open)

== The Players Championship ==
=== Wins (1) ===
| Year | Championship | 54 holes | Winning score | Margin | Runner-up |
|---|---|---|---|---|---|
| 1999 | The Players Championship | 1 shot lead | −3 (69-69-74-73=285) | 2 strokes | (United States) Scott Gump |

=== Results timeline ===
| Tournament | 1995 | 1996 | 1997 | 1998 | 1999 |
|---|---|---|---|---|---|
| The Players Championship | CUT | T4 | T43 | T18 | 1 |

| Tournament | 2000 | 2001 | 2002 | 2003 | 2004 | 2005 | 2006 | 2007 | 2008 | 2009 |
|---|---|---|---|---|---|---|---|---|---|---|
| The Players Championship | T13 | | T28 | CUT | | CUT | CUT | | | |

| Tournament | 2010 | 2011 |
|---|---|---|
| The Players Championship | | CUT |

Win
Top 10
Did not play

CUT = missed the halfway cut
"T" indicates a tie for a place.

== Results in World Golf Championships ==
| Tournament | 1999 | 2000 | 2001 | 2002 | 2003 |
|---|---|---|---|---|---|
| Match Play | R32 | 3 | | R64 | R64 |
| Championship | | | NT^{1} | T46 | |
| Invitational | T27 | | 27 | T28 | |

^{1}Cancelled due to 9/11

Top 10
Did not play

QF, R16, R32, R64 = Round in which player lost in match play
"T" = tied
NT = No tournament

== Results in senior major championships ==
Results not in chronological order

| Tournament | 2022 | 2023 | 2024 | 2025 | 2026 |
|---|---|---|---|---|---|
| Senior PGA Championship | CUT | | | T21 | |
| The Tradition | T66 | | T52 | T12 | T39 |
| U.S. Senior Open | CUT | | | | |
| Senior Players Championship | T59 | T59 | T44 | T33 | T40 |
| Senior British Open Championship | CUT | | | CUT | CUT |

Did not play

CUT = missed the halfway cut
"T" indicates a tie for a place

== PGA Tour career summary ==
| Season | Wins (Majors) | Earnings ($) | Rank |
|---|---|---|---|
| 1990 | 0 | 0 | n/a |
| 1991 | – | – | – |
| 1992 | 0 | 0 | n/a |
| 1993 | 0 | $27,181 | 201 |
| 1994 | 0 | $44,006 | 195 |
| 1995 | 0 | $881,436 | 11 |
| 1996 | 0 | $977,079 | 10 |
| 1997 | 3 | $1,885,308 | 2 |
| 1998 | 4 | $2,591,031 | 1 |
| 1999 | 4 | $3,641,906 | 2 |
| 2000 | 1 | $2,462,846 | 7 |
| 2001 | 1 (1) | $2,801,760 | 8 |
| 2002 | 0 | $838,045 | 80 |
| 2003 | 0 | $84,708 | 211 |
| 2004 | 0 | $121,044 | 210 |
| 2005 | 0 | $7,630 | 260 |
| 2006 | 0 | $318,276 | 172 |
| 2007 | 0 | $71,945 | 222 |
| 2008 | 0 | $114,974 | 219 |
| 2009 | 0 | $623,824 | 130 |
| 2010 | 0 | $919,584 | 106 |
| 2011 | 0 | $400,654 | 152 |
| 2012 | 0 | $32,936 | 233 |
| 2013 | 0 | $6,210 | 251 |
| 2014 | 0 | $94,709 | 207 |
| 2015 | 0 | $36,839 | 232 |
| 2016 | 0 | 0 | n/a |
| 2017 | 0 | 0 | n/a |
| 2018 | 0 | 0 | n/a |
| Career* | 13 (1) | $18,983,931 | 81 |

* As of the 2018 season

== U.S. national team appearances ==
Amateur

- Eisenhower Trophy: 1990, 1992
- Walker Cup: 1991 (winners)

Professional

- Presidents Cup: 1996 (winners), 1998, 2000 (winners)
- Ryder Cup: 1999 (winners), 2002
- World Cup: 2000 (winners), 2001

== See also ==
- 1994 Nike Tour graduates
- List of longest PGA Tour win streaks
- List of World Number One male golfers
- Monday Night Golf
- Lowest rounds of golf
