= 1997 Nike Tour =

Golf tour season

1997 Nike Tour season
- Duration: January 30, 1997 – October 19, 1997
- Number of official events: 29
- Most wins: (United States) Chris Smith (3)
- Money list: (United States) Chris Smith
- Player of the Year: (United States) Chris Smith

The 1997 Nike Tour was the eighth season of the Nike Tour, the official development tour to the PGA Tour.

== Schedule ==
The following table lists official events during the 1997 season.

Date	Tournament	Location	Purse (US$)	Winner (Note: The number in parentheses after each winner's name is the number of Nike Tour events they had won up to and including that tournament. This information is only shown for Nike Tour members. It is rare for someone to accumulate many wins on the Nike Tour as success at this level usually leads to promotion to the PGA Tour.)	Notes
Feb 2	Nike Lakeland Classic	Florida	200,000	(United States) Ryan Howison (1)	New tournament
Feb 23	Nike Inland Empire Open	California	200,000	(United States) Mark Carnevale (1)	
Mar 16	Nike Monterrey Open	Mexico	225,000	(United States) Mike Small (1)	
Mar 30	Nike Louisiana Open	Louisiana	300,000	(United States) Joe Daley (1)	
Apr 6	Nike Greater Austin Open	Texas	200,000	(United States) Eric Booker (1)	New tournament
Apr 20	Nike Mississippi Gulf Coast Classic	Mississippi	200,000	(United States) Jeff Brehaut (2)	
Apr 27	Nike Alabama Classic	Alabama	200,000	(United States) John Elliott (2)	
May 4	Nike South Carolina Classic	South Carolina	200,000	(United States) Harrison Frazar (1)	
May 11	Nike Carolina Classic	North Carolina	200,000	(Canada) Ahmad Bateman (1)	
May 18	Nike Dominion Open	Virginia	225,000	(United States) Jeff Julian (1)	
Jun 1	Nike Upstate Classic	South Carolina	200,000	(United States) Chris Smith (3)	
Jun 8	Nike Knoxville Open	Tennessee	200,000	(United States) Dave Rummells (2)	
Jun 15	Nike Miami Valley Open	Ohio	200,000	(Namibia) Trevor Dodds (2)	
Jun 22	Nike Cleveland Open	Ohio	200,000	(United States) Mike Small (2)	
Jul 6	Nike Hershey Open	Pennsylvania	200,000	(United States) Barry Cheesman (2)	New tournament
Jul 13	Nike Laurel Creek Classic	New Jersey	200,000	(United States) Matt Gogel (2)	
Jul 20	Nike St. Louis Golf Classic	Missouri	200,000	(United States) Todd Gleaton (1)	
Jul 27	Nike Wichita Open	Kansas	200,000	(United States) Ben Bates (1)	
Aug 3	Nike Dakota Dunes Open	South Dakota	200,000	(United States) Chris Smith (4)	
Aug 10	Nike Omaha Classic	Nebraska	200,000	(United States) Chris Smith (5) (Note: Smith earned immediate promotion to the PGA Tour, as this was his third win of the season.)	
Aug 17	Nike Ozarks Open	Missouri	200,000	(United States) Chris DiMarco (1)	
Aug 24	Nike Permian Basin Open	Texas	200,000	(Australia) Paul Gow (1)	
Sep 7	Nike Colorado Classic	Colorado	200,000	(United States) Pat Bates (2)	
Sep 14	Nike San Jose Open	California	200,000	(United States) R. W. Eaks (3)	
Sep 21	Nike Boise Open	Idaho	275,000	(Malaysia) Iain Steel (1)	
Sep 28	Nike Tri-Cities Open	Washington	200,000	(United States) Todd Gleaton (2)	
Oct 5	Nike Puget Sound Open	Washington	200,000	(United States) Kevin Johnson (1)	
Oct 12	Nike Shreveport Open	Louisiana	200,000	(United States) Mark Wurtz (1)	
Oct 19	Nike Tour Championship	Alabama	300,000	(United States) Steve Flesch (1)	Tour Championship

== Money list ==
The money list was based on prize money won during the season, calculated in U.S. dollars. The top 15 players on the money list earned status to play on the 1998 PGA Tour.

Position	Player	Prize money ($)
1	(United States) Chris Smith	225,201
2	(United States) Mark Carnevale	184,997
3	(United States) Chris DiMarco	135,513
4	(United States) Steve Flesch	133,190
5	(Namibia) Trevor Dodds	130,983

== Awards ==
Award	Winner	Ref.
Player of the Year (Jack Nicklaus Trophy)	(United States) Chris Smith	
