= 1997 Nike Tour graduates =

This is a list of players who graduated from the Nike Tour in 1997. The top 15 players on the Nike Tour's money list in 1997 earned their PGA Tour card for 1998.

	1997 Nike Tour		1998 PGA Tour				
Player	Money list rank	Earnings ($)	Starts	Cuts made	Best finish	Money list rank	Earnings ($)
(United States) Chris Smith	1	225,201	31	16	T7	144	184,933
(United States) Mark Carnevale	2	184,997	32	15	T7	150	174,470
(United States) Chris DiMarco	3	135,513	31	17	T9 (twice)	111	260,334
(United States) Steve Flesch*	4	133,190	29	14	2	35	777,186
(Namibia) Trevor Dodds	5	130,983	29	18	Win	33	791,340
(United States) Barry Cheesman	6	120,033	32	15	3	100	310,535
(United States) J. L. Lewis	7	119,829	32	15	4	104	287,753
(United States) Brian Kamm	8	118,005	28	10	13	189	87,326
(United States) R. W. Eaks	9	117,665	34	11	T7	137	199,499
(Canada) Glen Hnatiuk*	10	116,381	30	15	T14	165	148,098
(United States) Joe Daley	11	105,297	27	8	T27	211	42,092
(United States) Ben Bates*	12	105,089	31	22	T8	112	260,225
(United States) Harrison Frazar*	13	104,023	26	16	T2	63	461,633
(United States) Mike Small*	14	102,079	26	8	T9	178	112,336
(United States) Bobby Wadkins	15	101,717	32	15	T15	154	171,854

*PGA Tour rookie for 1998.

T = Tied
Green background indicates the player retained his PGA Tour card for 1999 (won or finished inside the top 125).
Yellow background indicates player did not retain his PGA Tour card for 1999, but retained conditional status (finished between 126–150).
Red background indicates the player did not retain his PGA Tour card for 1999 (finished outside the top 150).

== Winners on the PGA Tour in 1998 ==
No.	Date	Player	Tournament	Winning score	Margin of victory	Runner-up
1	Apr 26	(Namibia) Trevor Dodds; Won on first playoff hole	Greater Greensboro Chrysler Classic	−12 (68-69-70-69=276)	Playoff	(United States) Scott Verplank

== Runners-up on the PGA Tour in 1998 ==
No.	Date	Player	Tournament	Winner	Winning score	Runner-up score
1	Apr 5	(United States) Steve Flesch	Freeport-McDermott Classic	(England) Lee Westwood	−15 (69-68-67-69=273)	−12 (66-68-71-71=276)
2	May 17	(United States) Harrison Frazar	GTE Byron Nelson Golf Classic	(United States) John Cook	−15 (66-68-66-65=265)	−12 (64-68-66-70=268)

== See also ==
- 1997 PGA Tour Qualifying School graduates
