= Jeff Brehaut =

American golfer (born 1963)

Personal information
- Nationality: United States
- Born: June 13, 1963 (age 63) Mountain View, California, U.S.
- Height: 6 ft 0 in (1.83 m)
- Weight: 170 lb (77 kg; 12 st)

Career
- Sport: Golf
- College: University of the Pacific
- Turned professional: 1986
- Current tour: Champions Tour
- Former tours: PGA Tour; Web.com Tour
- Professional wins: 5

Number of wins by tour
- Korn Ferry Tour: 2
- Other: 3

Best results in major championships
- Masters Tournament: DNP
- PGA Championship: DNP
- U.S. Open: T17: 2007
- The Open Championship: DNP

Jeff Brehaut (born June 13, 1963) is an American professional golfer.

== Early life ==
Brehaut was born in Mountain View, California, and attended the University of the Pacific, where he graduated in 1986 with a degree in Communications.

== Professional career ==
Brehaut turned professional in 1986 and played on mini-tours until he started playing full-time on the Nationwide Tour in 1993. He played on the Nationwide Tour from 1993–98, picking up his only two wins in 1995 and 1997. He graduated from PGA Tour Q-School at the end of 1998 with a T23.

Brehaut played his first full season on the PGA Tour in 1999, but was unable to keep his card. He played a select few events on the Nationwide Tour in 2000, but failed to make any cuts. He got his PGA Tour card again for 2001-07, with his best season being 2005 where he made 16 of 33 cuts, had 5 top-10s and earned $1,217,061.

In November 2004, Brehaut won the Callaway Golf Pebble Beach Invitational after making a 5-foot putt birdie putt on 18 for a one stroke win over Kevin Sutherland.

Brehaut last played full-time on the PGA Tour in 2007, where he made 8 cuts in 21 events and lost his PGA Tour card. He has been back playing the Nationwide Tour full-time since the 2008 season. He achieved his first top-5 finish since May 2008 with a T5 effort at the 2010 Chattanooga Classic in October.

His best finish on the PGA Tour was 3rd at the 2005 The International.

His best finish at a major championship was a T17 in the 2007 U.S. Open.

He has over $3,700,000 in career earnings on the PGA Tour and over $600,000 in Nationwide Tour career earnings.

Brehaut, who earned his spot through a regional qualifying event, was the co-leader at the 2009 U.S. Open on Thursday's first round which was rained out due to torrential rain. Brehaut was at -1 through 11 holes at Bethpage Black golf course. He finished tied for 58th.

Brehaut finished 2nd at the Champions Tour qualifying tournament in December 2012 and is eligible to compete once he turns 50 on June 13, 2013. His first senior event will be the Encompass Championship near Chicago in mid-June.

== Professional wins (5) ==
=== Nike Tour wins (2) ===
No.	Date	Tournament	Winning score	Margin of victory	Runners-up
1	Mar 5, 1995	Nike Inland Empire Open	−12 (70-66-68=204)	1 stroke	(United States) Danny Briggs, (United States) David Toms
2	Apr 20, 1997	Nike Mississippi Gulf Coast Open	−13 (71-69-65-70=275)	6 strokes	(United States) Dan Bateman, (United States) Tom Scherrer

Nike Tour playoff record (0–1)

No.	Year	Tournament	Opponents	Result
1	1997	Nike Wichita Open	(United States) Ben Bates, (United States) Carl Paulson, (United States) Chris Smith	Bates won with birdie on first extra hole

=== Other wins (3) ===
- 2004 Callaway Golf Pebble Beach Invitational
- 2009 Straight Down Fall Classic (with Todd Barsotti)
- 2018 Northern California PGA Championship

== Results in major championships ==
Tournament	2007	2008	2009
U.S. Open	T17		T58

Did not play

"T" = tied
Note: Brehaut only played in the U.S. Open.

== See also ==
- 1998 PGA Tour Qualifying School graduates
- 1999 PGA Tour Qualifying School graduates
- 2001 PGA Tour Qualifying School graduates
- 2002 PGA Tour Qualifying School graduates
- 2004 PGA Tour Qualifying School graduates
