= 2001 PGA Tour =

Golf tour season

2001 PGA Tour season
- Duration: January 3, 2001 – November 4, 2001
- Number of official events: 47 (Note: A further two tournaments were scheduled but were canceled.)
- Most wins: (United States) Tiger Woods (5)
- Money list: (United States) Tiger Woods
- PGA Tour Player of the Year: (United States) Tiger Woods
- PGA Player of the Year: (United States) Tiger Woods
- Rookie of the Year: (United States) Charles Howell III

The 2001 PGA Tour was the 86th season of the PGA Tour, the main professional golf tour in the United States. It was also the 33rd season since separating from the PGA of America.

== Schedule ==
The following table lists official events during the 2001 season.

Date	Tournament	Location	Purse (US$)	Winner (Note: The number in parentheses after each winner's name is the number of PGA Tour events they had won up to and including that tournament. This information is only shown for PGA Tour members.)	OWGR points	Notes
Jan 7	WGC-Accenture Match Play Championship	Australia	5,000,000	(United States) Steve Stricker (3)	58	World Golf Championship
Jan 14	Mercedes Championships	Hawaii	3,500,000	(United States) Jim Furyk (6)	60	Winners-only event
Jan 15	Touchstone Energy Tucson Open	Arizona	3,000,000	(United States) Garrett Willis (1)	26	Alternate event
Jan 21	Sony Open in Hawaii	Hawaii	4,000,000	(United States) Brad Faxon (7)	54	
Jan 28	Phoenix Open	Arizona	4,000,000	(United States) Mark Calcavecchia (11)	70	
Feb 4	AT&T Pebble Beach National Pro-Am	California	4,000,000	(United States) Davis Love III (14)	58	Pro-Am
Feb 11	Buick Invitational	California	3,500,000	(United States) Phil Mickelson (18)	58	
Feb 18	Bob Hope Chrysler Classic	California	3,500,000	(United States) Joe Durant (2)	54	Pro-Am
Feb 25	Nissan Open	California	3,400,000	(Australia) Robert Allenby (3)	56	
Mar 4	Genuity Championship	Florida	4,500,000	(United States) Joe Durant (3)	58	
Mar 11	Honda Classic	Florida	3,200,000	(Sweden) Jesper Parnevik (5)	46	
Mar 18	Bay Hill Invitational	Florida	3,500,000	(United States) Tiger Woods (25)	68	Invitational
Mar 26	The Players Championship	Florida	6,000,000	(United States) Tiger Woods (26)	80	Flagship event
Apr 1	BellSouth Classic	Georgia	3,300,000	(United States) Scott McCarron (3)	52	
Apr 8	Masters Tournament	Georgia	5,600,000	(United States) Tiger Woods (27)	100	Major championship
Apr 16	WorldCom Classic - The Heritage of Golf	South Carolina	3,500,000	(Argentina) José Cóceres (1)	56	Invitational
Apr 22	Shell Houston Open	Texas	3,400,000	(United States) Hal Sutton (14)	46	
Apr 29	Greater Greensboro Chrysler Classic	North Carolina	3,500,000	(United States) Scott Hoch (9)	34	
May 6	Compaq Classic of New Orleans	Louisiana	4,000,000	(United States) David Toms (5)	54	
May 13	Verizon Byron Nelson Classic	Texas	4,500,000	(United States) Robert Damron (1)	66	
May 20	MasterCard Colonial	Texas	4,000,000	(Spain) Sergio García (1)	62	Invitational
May 28	Kemper Insurance Open	Maryland	3,500,000	(United States) Frank Lickliter (1)	44	
Jun 3	Memorial Tournament	Ohio	4,100,000	(United States) Tiger Woods (28)	62	Invitational
Jun 10	FedEx St. Jude Classic	Tennessee	3,500,000	(United States) Bob Estes (2)	48	
Jun 18	U.S. Open	Oklahoma	5,000,000	(South Africa) Retief Goosen (1)	100	Major championship
Jun 25	Buick Classic	New York	3,500,000	(Spain) Sergio García (2)	56	
Jul 1	Canon Greater Hartford Open	Connecticut	3,100,000	(United States) Phil Mickelson (19)	50	
Jul 8	Advil Western Open	Illinois	3,600,000	(United States) Scott Hoch (10)	62	
Jul 15	Greater Milwaukee Open	Wisconsin	3,100,000	(Japan) Shigeki Maruyama (1)	24	
Jul 22	The Open Championship	England	£3,300,000	(United States) David Duval (13)	100	Major championship
Jul 22	B.C. Open	New York	2,000,000	(United States) Jeff Sluman (5)	24	Alternate event
Jul 29	John Deere Classic	Illinois	2,800,000	(United States) David Gossett (1)	24	
Aug 5	The International	Colorado	4,000,000	(United States) Tom Pernice Jr. (2)	56	
Aug 12	Buick Open	Michigan	3,100,000	(United States) Kenny Perry (4)	54	
Aug 19	PGA Championship	Georgia	5,200,000	(United States) David Toms (6)	100	Major championship
Aug 26	WGC-NEC Invitational	Ohio	5,000,000	(United States) Tiger Woods (29)	68	World Golf Championship
Aug 26	Reno–Tahoe Open	Nevada	3,000,000	(United States) John Cook (11)	24	Alternate event
Sep 2	Air Canada Championship	Canada	3,400,000	(United States) Joel Edwards (1)	24	
Sep 9	Bell Canadian Open	Canada	3,800,000	(United States) Scott Verplank (4)	48	
~~Sep 16~~	WGC-American Express Championship	Missouri	–	Canceled (Note: Canceled due to the September 11 attacks.)	–	World Golf Championship
~~Sep 16~~	Tampa Bay Classic	Florida	–	Canceled	–	Alternate event
Sep 23	Marconi Pennsylvania Classic	Pennsylvania	3,300,000	(Australia) Robert Allenby (4)	48	
Sep 30	Texas Open	Texas	3,000,000	(United States) Justin Leonard (6)	28	
Oct 7	Michelob Championship at Kingsmill	Virginia	3,500,000	(United States) David Toms (7)	48	
Oct 14	Invensys Classic at Las Vegas	Nevada	4,500,000	(United States) Bob Estes (3)	50	
Oct 21	National Car Rental Golf Classic Disney	Florida	3,400,000	(Argentina) José Cóceres (2)	58	
Oct 28	Buick Challenge	Georgia	3,400,000	(United States) Chris DiMarco (2)	60	
Nov 4	The Tour Championship	Texas	5,000,000	(Canada) Mike Weir (3)	60	Tour Championship
Nov 4	Southern Farm Bureau Classic	Mississippi	2,400,000	(United States) Cameron Beckman (1)	24	Alternate event

=== Unofficial events ===
The following events were sanctioned by the PGA Tour, but did not carry official money, nor were wins official.

Date	Tournament	Location	Purse ($)	Winner(s)	Notes
Jul 10	CVS Charity Classic	Rhode Island	1,100,000	(United States) Mark Calcavecchia and (Zimbabwe) Nick Price	Team event
~~Sep 30~~	Ryder Cup	England	n/a	Postponed	Team event
Nov 11	Franklin Templeton Shootout	Florida	2,000,000	(United States) Brad Faxon and (United States) Scott McCarron	Team event
Nov 18	WGC-World Cup	Japan	3,000,000	(South Africa) Ernie Els and (South Africa) Retief Goosen	World Golf Championship; Team event
Nov 21	PGA Grand Slam of Golf	Hawaii	1,000,000	(United States) Tiger Woods	Limited-field event
Nov 25	Skins Game	California	1,000,000	(Australia) Greg Norman	Limited-field event
Dec 9	Hyundai Team Matches	California	400,000	(United States) Mark Calcavecchia and (United States) Fred Couples	Team event
Dec 16	Williams World Challenge	California	4,120,000	(United States) Tiger Woods	Limited-field event

== Location of tournaments ==
Location of official tournaments of the 2001 PGA Tour in the continental United States and Canada.
Players & Majors
World Golf Championships
Regular events
Alternate events
Tour Championship
Location of official tournaments of the 2001 PGA Tour outside the continental United States and Canada.
Players & Majors
World Golf Championships
Regular events

== Money list ==
The money list was based on prize money won during the season, calculated in U.S. dollars.

Position	Player	Prize money ($)
1	(United States) Tiger Woods	5,687,777
2	(United States) Phil Mickelson	4,403,883
3	(United States) David Toms	3,791,595
4	(Fiji) Vijay Singh	3,440,829
5	(United States) Davis Love III	3,169,463
6	(Spain) Sergio García	2,898,635
7	(United States) Scott Hoch	2,875,319
8	(United States) David Duval	2,801,760
9	(United States) Bob Estes	2,795,477
10	(United States) Scott Verplank	2,783,401

== Awards ==
Award	Winner	Ref.
PGA Tour Player of the Year (Jack Nicklaus Trophy)	(United States) Tiger Woods	
PGA Player of the Year	(United States) Tiger Woods	
Rookie of the Year	(United States) Charles Howell III	
Scoring leader (PGA Tour – Byron Nelson Award)	(United States) Tiger Woods	
Scoring leader (PGA – Vardon Trophy)	(United States) Tiger Woods	
Comeback Player of the Year	(United States) Joe Durant	

== See also ==
- 2001 Buy.com Tour
- 2001 Senior PGA Tour
