= John Riegger =

American professional golfer (born 1963)

Personal information
- Nationality: United States
- Born: June 13, 1963 (age 63) Metropolis, Illinois, U.S.
- Height: 6 ft 3 in (1.91 m)
- Weight: 190 lb (86 kg; 14 st)

Career
- Sport: Golf
- College: Lamar University
- Turned professional: 1985
- Former tours: PGA Tour; Nationwide Tour; U.S. Golf Tour; Champions Tour
- Professional wins: 4

Number of wins by tour
- Korn Ferry Tour: 2
- PGA Tour Champions: 1
- Other: 1

Best results in major championships
- Masters Tournament: DNP
- PGA Championship: DNP
- U.S. Open: DNP
- The Open Championship: CUT: 2002

John Riegger (born June 13, 1963) is an American professional golfer who has played on the PGA Tour, the Web.com Tour, and the Champions Tour.

== Early life and amateur career ==
Riegger was born in Metropolis, Illinois. He graduated from Lamar University in 1985.

== Professional career ==
In 1985, turned professional that year. Riegger originally made it onto the PGA Tour through 1986 PGA Tour Qualifying School. However, he had an erratic career alternating between the main tour and the developmental tour. His last year on the main tour was in 2008 and his last year on the developmental tour was in 2010. He won twice on the developmental tour, both late in his career. Meanwhile, his best finish on the main tour was a tie for fifth at the 2006 John Deere Classic.

== Professional wins (4) ==
=== Nationwide Tour wins (2) ===
| No. | Date | Tournament | Winning score | Margin of victory | Runner-up |
|---|---|---|---|---|---|
| 1 | Jun 3, 2007 | LaSalle Bank Open | −17 (70-65-68-68=271) | 1 stroke | (United States) B. J. Staten |
| 2 | May 23, 2010 | Rex Hospital Open | −20 (66-64-63=193) (Note: Shortened to 54 holes due to weather.) | 5 strokes | (United States) Chris Nallen |

=== U.S. Golf Tour wins (1) ===
| No. | Date | Tournament | Winning score | Margin of victory | Runner-up |
|---|---|---|---|---|---|
| 1 | May 12, 1991 | Fairfield Harbour Open | −18 (71-64-67-68=270) | 2 strokes | (United States) Bryan Wagner |

=== Champions Tour wins (1) ===
| No. | Date | Tournament | Winning score | Margin of victory | Runner-up |
|---|---|---|---|---|---|
| 1 | Aug 25, 2013 | Boeing Classic | −15 (69-64-68=201) | 2 strokes | (United States) John Cook |

== Results in major championships ==
| Tournament | 2002 |
|---|---|
| The Open Championship | CUT |

CUT = missed the halfway cut
Note: Riegger only played in The Open Championship.

== Results in The Players Championship ==
| Tournament | 2004 |
|---|---|
| The Players Championship | CUT |

CUT = missed the halfway cut

== Results in senior major championships ==
Results not in chronological order before 2022.

| Tournament | 2013 | 2014 | 2015 | 2016 | 2017 | 2018 | 2019 | 2020 | 2021 | 2022 |
|---|---|---|---|---|---|---|---|---|---|---|
| The Tradition | | T40 | T32 | | | | | NT | | |
| Senior PGA Championship | | T30 | T58 | CUT | CUT | | | NT | T5 | WD |
| U.S. Senior Open | T23 | T43 | T38 | | CUT | | 7 | NT | T64 | |
| Senior Players Championship | | T12 | T39 | | T54 | | | | | |
| Senior British Open Championship | | WD | | | | | | NT | | |

Top 10
Did not play

"T" indicates a tie for a place
CUT = missed the halfway cut
WD = withdrew
NT = No tournament due to COVID-19 pandemic

== See also ==
- 1986 PGA Tour Qualifying School graduates
- 1991 PGA Tour Qualifying School graduates
- 1997 PGA Tour Qualifying School graduates
- 2000 Buy.com Tour graduates
- 2001 PGA Tour Qualifying School graduates
- 2003 PGA Tour Qualifying School graduates
- 2007 Nationwide Tour graduates
