= Ben Bates =

American professional golfer (born 1961)

Personal information
- Nationality: United States
- Born: June 12, 1961 (age 65) Quincy, Florida, U.S.
- Height: 6 ft 0 in (1.83 m)
- Weight: 195 lb (88 kg; 13.9 st)

Career
- Sport: Golf
- College: Troy State University
- Turned professional: 1984
- Former tours: PGA Tour; Nationwide Tour; Champions Tour
- Professional wins: 2

Number of wins by tour
- Korn Ferry Tour: 2

Best results in major championships
- Masters Tournament: DNP
- PGA Championship: DNP
- U.S. Open: CUT: 2001
- The Open Championship: DNP

Ben Bates (born June 12, 1961) is an American professional golfer who has played on the Nationwide Tour and the PGA Tour.

== Amateur career ==
Bates was a member of the NCAA Division II championship team at Troy State University and won five collegiate tournaments.

== Professional career ==
Bates has primarily played on the PGA Tour's developmental tour. He was a member of the tour from 1990 to 1997 and from 2001 to 2009. Bates is the tour's all-time leader in cuts (226) and starts (410). He played in his 1,000th round on tour in 2007. Bates won two events on tour including the 1997 Wichita Open where he defeated Carl Paulson, Jeff Brehaut and Chris Smith in a four-man playoff. He also won The Reese's Cup Classic in a playoff in 2004.

Bates was also a member of PGA Tour from 1998 to 2001. He made his first PGA Tour appearance since 2001 at the 2010 Transitions Championship.

== Personal life ==
Bates now resides in Pensacola, Florida.

== Professional wins (2) ==
=== Nationwide Tour wins (2) ===
No.	Date	Tournament	Winning score	Margin of victory	Runner(s)-up
1	Jul 27, 1997	Nike Wichita Open	−19 (67-72-64-66=269)	Playoff	(United States) Jeff Brehaut, (United States) Carl Paulson, (United States) Chris Smith
2	Jul 4, 2004	Reese's Cup Classic	−6 (70-69-66-73=278)	Playoff	(Australia) Paul Gow

Nationwide Tour playoff record (2–0)

No.	Year	Tournament	Opponent(s)	Result
1	1997	Nike Wichita Open	(United States) Jeff Brehaut, (United States) Carl Paulson, (United States) Chris Smith	Won with birdie on first extra hole
2	2004	Reese's Cup Classic	(Australia) Paul Gow	Won with par on eighth extra hole

== Results in major championships ==
Tournament	2001
U.S. Open	CUT

Note: Bates only played in the U.S. Open.
CUT = missed the half-way cut

== See also ==
- 1997 Nike Tour graduates
- 1999 PGA Tour Qualifying School graduates
