= Tommy Armour III =

American professional golfer (born 1959)

Personal information
- Full name: Thomas Dickson Armour III
- Nationality: United States
- Born: October 8, 1959 (age 67) Denver, Colorado, U.S.
- Height: 6 ft 2 in (1.88 m)
- Weight: 190 lb (86 kg; 14 st)

Career
- Sport: Golf
- College: University of New Mexico
- Turned professional: 1981
- Current tour: Champions Tour
- Former tour: PGA Tour
- Professional wins: 8
- Highest ranking: 82 (February 18, 1990)

Number of wins by tour
- PGA Tour: 2
- Korn Ferry Tour: 2
- Other: 4

Best results in major championships
- Masters Tournament: CUT: 1990
- PGA Championship: T24: 1989
- U.S. Open: T40: 2006
- The Open Championship: T28: 1988

Thomas Dickson Armour III (born October 8, 1959) is an American professional golfer. He is the grandson of three-time major champion Tommy Armour.

== Professional career ==
Armour first joined the PGA Tour in 1981 at the age of 21. He has two career PGA Tour victories, winning the 1990 Phoenix Open and the 2003 Valero Texas Open. Armour previously held the scoring record for best overall 72 hole score (254), which he set with his Valero Texas Open victory in 2003, until it was surpassed in 2017 by Justin Thomas.

He lost his Tour card in 2006 due to an injury; Armour finished 110th on the 2007 PGA Tour money list, earning his card for 2008. He finished his year with a win at the non-PGA Tour sponsored Callaway Golf Pebble Beach Invitational, winning $60,000. In 2008, he finished 62nd on the money list to retain his card for 2009 and was the first repeat champion at the Callaway Golf Pebble Beach Invitational.

He made his Champions Tour debut at The ACE Group Classic in February 2010.

In 2011, despite his Champions Tour status, Armour decided to go to PGA Tour Q School. At 52, he was the oldest player in the field. Armour later withdrew from the tournament.

== Professional wins (8) ==
=== PGA Tour wins (2) ===
No.	Date	Tournament	Winning score	Margin of victory	Runner(s)-up
1	Jan 28, 1990	Phoenix Open	−17 (65-67-67-68=267)	5 strokes	(United States) Jim Thorpe
2	Sep 28, 2003	Valero Texas Open	−26 (64-62-63-65=254)	7 strokes	(United States) Loren Roberts, (United States) Bob Tway

PGA Tour playoff record (0–1)

No.	Year	Tournament	Opponent	Result
1	1999	Touchstone Energy Tucson Open	(Sweden) Gabriel Hjertstedt	Lost to birdie on first extra hole

=== Nike Tour wins (2) ===
No.	Date	Tournament	Winning score	Margin of victory	Runner(s)-up
1	Jun 5, 1994	Nike Miami Valley Open	−18 (68-67-66-65=266)	3 strokes	(United States) Jim Carter
2	Jun 12, 1994	Nike Cleveland Open	−13 (68-68-70-69=275)	Playoff	(United States) Scott Gump, (United States) Tom Scherrer

Nike Tour playoff record (1–0)

No.	Year	Tournament	Opponents	Result
1	1994	Nike Cleveland Open	(United States) Scott Gump, (United States) Tom Scherrer	Won with birdie on first extra hole

=== Other wins (4) ===
- 1983 Mexican Open
- 2007 Callaway Golf Pebble Beach Invitational
- 2008 Callaway Golf Pebble Beach Invitational
- 2014 Callaway Pebble Beach Invitational

== Results in major championships ==
Tournament	1986	1987	1988	1989
Masters Tournament				
U.S. Open				CUT
The Open Championship	T46		T28	T39
PGA Championship				T24

Tournament	1990	1991	1992	1993	1994	1995	1996	1997	1998	1999
Masters Tournament	CUT									
U.S. Open									T55	
The Open Championship	CUT									
PGA Championship				CUT	CUT					

Tournament	2000	2001	2002	2003	2004	2005	2006	2007	2008
Masters Tournament									
U.S. Open	CUT			CUT		T57	T40		
The Open Championship									
PGA Championship					T45				CUT

Did not play

CUT = missed the half-way cut
"T" indicates a tie for a place

=== Summary ===
Tournament	Wins	2nd	3rd	Top-5	Top-10	Top-25	Events	Cuts made
Masters Tournament	0	0	0	0	0	0	1	0
U.S. Open	0	0	0	0	0	0	6	3
The Open Championship	0	0	0	0	0	0	4	3
PGA Championship	0	0	0	0	0	1	5	2
Totals	0	0	0	0	0	1	16	8

- Most consecutive cuts made – 3 (2004 PGA – 2006 U.S. Open)
- Longest streak of top-10s – 0

== Results in The Players Championship ==
Tournament	1989	1990	1991	1992	1993	1994	1995	1996	1997	1998	1999
The Players Championship	CUT	CUT	71							T31	CUT

Tournament	2000	2001	2002	2003	2004	2005	2006	2007	2008	2009
The Players Championship	CUT	WD			CUT	T56	CUT		T73	T22

Did not play

CUT = missed the halfway cut
WD = withdrew
"T" indicates a tie for a place

== Results in World Golf Championships ==
Tournament	2004
Match Play	
Championship	
Invitational	T50

Did not play

"T" = Tied

== See also ==
- Fall 1981 PGA Tour Qualifying School graduates
- 1987 PGA Tour Qualifying School graduates
- 1994 Nike Tour graduates
- 1996 PGA Tour Qualifying School graduates
- 2001 PGA Tour Qualifying School graduates
