= Barry Cheesman =

American professional golfer (born 1959)

Personal information
- Nationality: United States
- Born: August 29, 1959 (age 67) Galesburg, Illinois, U.S.
- Height: 6 ft 3 in (1.91 m)
- Weight: 220 lb (100 kg; 16 st)

Career
- Sport: Golf
- Turned professional: 1986
- Former tours: PGA Tour; Nationwide Tour
- Professional wins: 2

Number of wins by tour
- Korn Ferry Tour: 2

Best results in major championships
- Masters Tournament: DNP
- PGA Championship: DNP
- U.S. Open: CUT: 1993, 1999
- The Open Championship: DNP

Barry Cheesman (born August 29, 1959) is an American professional golfer who played on the Nationwide and PGA Tours. Before getting into golf, he was a minor league baseball player.

== Professional career ==
=== Baseball career ===
Cheesman was drafted by the St. Louis Cardinals in the 1977 Major League Baseball draft with the 613th pick in the 25th round but never made it to the majors, spending four years in the minors. He was a catcher and a pitcher. He played for the Johnson City Cardinals of the Appalachian League and the Calgary Cardinals of the Pioneer Baseball League. He was traded to the California Angels organization in 1979 and played for the Salinas Angels of the California League. He was traded again to the New York Yankees organization in 1980 and played for the GCL Yankees of the Gulf Coast League. Cheesman finished his career with a .216 batting average in 67 games over three seasons.

=== Golf career ===
Cheesman became a golf professional in 1986 and earned his PGA Tour card for 1988 through qualifying school. In his rookie year on Tour he only made 6 of 30 cuts and failed to retain his Tour card. He joined the Nationwide Tour in 1990 and won the Ben Hogan Quail Hollow Open en route to a 13th-place finish on the money list which earned him his PGA Tour card for 1991. He struggled on Tour again, and had to return to qualifying school in 1992 where he earned his Tour card for 1993. After another poor season on the PGA Tour he took a hiatus from the PGA and Nationwide Tour and returned in 1997. He won the Nike Hershey Open en route to a 6th-place finish on the money list, earning him his PGA Tour card for 1998. He had his best year on Tour, finishing 100th on the money list. He had an even better year in 1999, finishing 95th on the money list while recording three top-10 finishes. He didn't fare as well in 2000 and finished 141st on the money list to earn partial status on Tour in 2001. He returned to the Nationwide Tour in 2002 and played on it until 2006 until retiring.

Cheesman was a scout for the Houston Astros in 2007. He is currently working as a golf professional in Florida.

== Professional wins (2) ==
=== Nike Tour wins (2) ===
No.	Date	Tournament	Winning score	Margin of victory	Runner(s)-up
1	Jun 10, 1990	Ben Hogan Quail Hollow Open	−9 (69-69-69=207)	2 strokes	(United States) Kim Young
2	Jul 6, 1997	Nike Hershey Open	−6 (71-71-70-66=278)	1 stroke	(United States) Greg Lesher, (United States) Billy Downes

== Results in major championships ==
Tournament	1993	1994	1995	1996	1997	1998	1999
U.S. Open	CUT						CUT

Note: The U.S. Open was the only major Cheesman played.

Did not play

CUT = missed the half-way cut

== See also ==
- 1987 PGA Tour Qualifying School graduates
- 1990 PGA Tour Qualifying School graduates
- 1992 PGA Tour Qualifying School graduates
- 1997 Nike Tour graduates
