= Chris Smith (golfer) =

American professional golfer (born 1969)

Personal information
- Full name: Christopher McClain Smith
- Nationality: United States
- Born: April 15, 1969 (age 57) Indianapolis, Indiana, U.S.
- Height: 5 ft 11 in (1.80 m)
- Weight: 190 lb (86 kg; 14 st)

Career
- Sport: Golf
- College: Ohio State University
- Turned professional: 1991
- Former tours: PGA Tour; Web.com Tour; Hooters Jordan Tour
- Professional wins: 21
- Highest ranking: 56 (June 23, 2002)

Number of wins by tour
- PGA Tour: 1
- Korn Ferry Tour: 5 (Tied-7th all-time)
- Other: 15

Best results in major championships
- Masters Tournament: DNP
- PGA Championship: T29: 2001
- U.S. Open: T60: 1997
- The Open Championship: 71st: 2003

Achievements and awards
- Big Ten Freshman of the Year: 1988
- Big Ten Player of the Year: 1991
- Nike Tour money list winner: 1997
- Nike Tour Player of the Year: 1997

Christopher McClain Smith (born April 15, 1969) is an American professional golfer who played on the PGA Tour and the Web.com Tour.

== Early life ==
Smith was born in Indianapolis, Indiana, graduating from Rochester Community High School; during his sophomore season (1985), he was the Boys State High School Champion, in his senior season (1987), he finished as the state runner-up in the boys state golf championship. He was awarded the Fred Keesling Award following his high school career.

== Amateur career ==
He attended Ohio State University, where he completed a successful collegiate career. He won seven individual titles, including the 1990 Big Ten Championship, the 1991 Robert Kepler Intercollegiate and 5 other events. He was a four-time All-Conference selection in the Big Ten from 1988 to 1991; his other Big Ten Awards include the 1988 Freshman of the Year, the 1990 Player of the Year and the 1990 Les Bolstad Award for lowest stroke average. He was named an All-America selection in 1990 as a junior (honorable mention) and in 1991 as a senior (first team). Smith won the Indiana State Amateur Championship in 1990 and competed in the Sun Bowl Golf Classic in 1990. He was inducted into the Ohio State Varsity O Hall of Fame in 2000.

== Professional career ==
In 1997, Smith became the first golfer on the Nike Tour to immediately move up to the PGA Tour by way of the "battlefield promotion," which is awarded to a player who wins three tournaments in one Nike Tour season. He was named the Nike Tour Player of the Year in 1997 and also led the money list.

Smith has won one tournament on the PGA Tour, the 2002 Buick Classic. Smith struggled on the PGA Tour after the win. Smith's best result on the PGA Tour since his sole win in 2002 was when he finished 3rd place at the 2004 Chrysler Classic of Greensboro.

In 2013, Smith was inducted into the Indiana Golf Hall of Fame for his successful career.

Smith held a share of the 54-hole lead at the 2015 Puerto Rico Open, but stumbled with a final-round 73 to finish T10. It was his first PGA Tour top-10 in ten years.

In 2018, Smith collected several professional wins on the Indiana Tour becoming the Indiana PGA Player of the Year. He also won the 2020 Indiana PGA Championship.

== Personal life ==
On June 21, 2009, Smith's wife was killed in an automobile accident. His two children were also critically injured.

== Amateur wins ==
- 1985 IHSAA Boys State Championship
- 1985 Indiana (Boys) State Junior
- 1986 Indiana (Boys) State Junior
- 1988 Western Junior
- 1990 Indiana State Amateur, Big Ten Championship (individual)
- 1991 Robert Kepler Intercollegiate
- 1988-91 Six additional intercollegiate events

== Professional wins (21) ==
=== PGA Tour wins (1) ===
No.	Date	Tournament	Winning score	Margin of victory	Runners-up
1	Jun 9, 2002	Buick Classic	−12 (66-69-67-70=272)	2 strokes	(United States) David Gossett, (United States) Pat Perez, (United States) Loren Roberts

=== Nike Tour wins (5) ===
No.	Date	Tournament	Winning score	Margin of victory	Runner(s)-up
1	Jul 23, 1995	Nike Gateway Classic	−13 (68-65-70=203) (Note: Shortened to 54 holes due to weather.)	Playoff	(Canada) Glen Hnatiuk
2	Aug 6, 1995	Nike Dakota Dunes Open	−16 (70-69-66-67=272)	1 stroke	(United States) Greg Hamilton, (United States) Clarence Rose
3	Jun 1, 1997	Nike Upstate Classic	−21 (66-64-67-70=267)	3 strokes	(Australia) Terry Price
4	Aug 3, 1997	Nike Dakota Dunes Open (2)	−20 (66-67-68-67=268)	2 strokes	(Canada) Glen Hnatiuk
5	Aug 10, 1997	Nike Omaha Classic	−26 (63-65-64-66=258)	11 strokes	(United States) Barry Cheesman

Nike Tour playoff record (1–3)

No.	Year	Tournament	Opponent	Result
1	1995	Nike Gateway Classic	(Canada) Glen Hnatiuk	Won with birdie on first extra hole
2	1997	Nike Wichita Open	(United States) Ben Bates, (United States) Jeff Brehaut, (United States) Carl Paulson	Bates won with birdie on first extra hole
3	2000	Buy.com Richmond Open	(United States) Steve Runge	Lost to birdie on first extra hole
4	2000	Buy.com Dayton Open	(Canada) Ian Leggatt	Lost to birdie on first extra hole

=== Hooters Jordan Tour wins (1) ===
No.	Date	Tournament	Winning score	Margin of victory	Runner-up
1	Jul 10, 1994	Coca-Cola Classic	−20 (67-67-67-67=268)	1 stroke	(United States) Bryan Gorman

=== Other wins (14) ===
- 1990 Indiana Match Play
- 1992 Ohio Open
- 1994 Ohio Open
- 2018 Indiana PGA Indianapolis Open, Indiana PGA Monticello Open, Indiana Section Tournament Series, Indiana PGA Southern Open
- 2019 Indiana PGA Pro-Am, Indiana PGA Senior Open, Indiana PGA Northern Open, Indiana PGA Monticello Open (2), Indiana PGA Team Championship
- 2020 Indiana PGA Championship
- 2021 Indiana PGA Senior Open (2)

== Results in major championships ==
Tournament	1997	1998	1999	2000	2001	2002	2003	2004
U.S. Open	T60		T62		CUT		CUT	CUT
The Open Championship						T75	71	
PGA Championship					T29	T53		

Note: Smith never played in the Masters Tournament.

Did not play

CUT = missed the half-way cut
"T" = tied

== Results in The Players Championship ==
Tournament	2002	2003	2004	2005
The Players Championship	CUT	CUT	CUT	CUT

CUT = missed the halfway cut

== Results in World Golf Championships ==
Tournament	2002
Match Play	
Championship	
Invitational	T55

Did not play

"T" = Tied

== See also ==
- 1995 Nike Tour graduates
- 1997 Nike Tour graduates
- 1998 PGA Tour Qualifying School graduates
- 2000 Buy.com Tour graduates
- List of golfers with most Web.com Tour wins
