= Harrison Frazar =

American professional golfer

Personal information
- Nationality: United States
- Born: July 29, 1971 (age 55) Dallas, Texas, U.S.
- Height: 6 ft 0 in (1.83 m)
- Weight: 190 lb (86 kg; 14 st)
- Spouse: Allison
- Children: 3

Career
- Sport: Golf
- College: University of Texas
- Turned professional: 1996
- Current tour: PGA Tour Champions
- Former tours: PGA Tour; Web.com Tour
- Professional wins: 4
- Highest ranking: 82 (May 9, 1999)

Number of wins by tour
- PGA Tour: 1
- Korn Ferry Tour: 1
- PGA Tour Champions: 1
- Other: 1

Best results in major championships
- Masters Tournament: CUT: 2012
- PGA Championship: T20: 2006
- U.S. Open: T30: 2011
- The Open Championship: 69th: 2011

Harrison Frazar (born July 29, 1971) is an American professional golfer who has played on the PGA Tour and the Web.com Tour and currently plays on the PGA Tour Champions.

== Amateur career ==
Frazar was born in Dallas, Texas and was raised there and in Abilene, Texas. He attended Highland Park High School, where he won two state golf championships and was a three-time all-Texas selection. He then attended the University of Texas majoring in Psychology and Business Foundations. He played on the Longhorns golf team where he was a three time honorable mention All-American. In his junior year he shot a 65, and led Texas to a 2nd-place team finish at the NCAA Championship.

== Professional career ==
Frazar worked as an analyst at a Dallas commercial real estate firm, managing and developing golf courses as part of his job. It was originally his intent to not play golf professionally, but Mark Brooks convinced him to give it a try.

On December 6, 2008, Frazer became one of the few golfers in history to shoot a 59 at a professional event. The 59 was scored on the Nicklaus Tournament Course at PGA West in La Quinta, California, in the fourth round of the qualifying school finals. He went on to take medalist honors, winning by eight strokes with a total of −32 after six rounds.

Throughout his career Frazar has been unfortunate with a number of injuries. He suffered a hip injury in 2001, and a wrist injury in 2005, both of which required surgery. In 2010 he again had surgery on his hip, as well as surgery on his shoulder. At one point, he was considering retirement from professional golf.

In 2011, Frazar was playing the PGA Tour on a medical exemption which required him to earn over $600,000 in 11 tournaments to earn his 2011 PGA Tour card. After missing five straight cuts Frazar took a number of weeks off to reassess his game and bounced back with a T-14 finish at the HP Byron Nelson Championship upon his return. Two weeks later, with two starts left on his medical exemption, he won his maiden PGA Tour title at the FedEx St. Jude Classic in a playoff over Swede Robert Karlsson. Frazar had a one stroke lead entering the final hole on Sunday but found the water hazard with his second shot resulting in a sudden death playoff. After both players parred the first two playoff holes, Frazar won at the third extra hole when Karlsson missed a 12-foot par putt to extend the playoff. This was Frazar's first win in 355 starts on tour; he had four second-place finishes in thirteen years. In an instant, Frazar went from planning his retirement after the season to a PGA Tour card through the 2013 season, an invitation to his first Masters in 2012, and a 138-point jump (178th to 40th) in the FedEx Cup. The win also elevated Frazar from 583rd to 144th in the Official World Golf Ranking. Frazar had already qualified his way into the U.S. Open the week before, where he finished T30. Frazar's earnings between The Players Championship and the AT&T National earned him an exemption into the 2011 Open Championship, his first Open, where his finished 69th.

Frazar's career high world ranking is 82nd, after finishing in a tie for second at the 2012 Sony Open in Hawaii.

Frazar sat out the 2013 season with a back injury and played the 2013–14 season on a Major Medical Extension. He made 4 cuts in 15 events, with no finish better than T58. As a PGA Tour player with a medical extension, he tried to regain his PGA Tour card through the Web.com Tour Finals, but had three finishes in the 60s and a missed cut. For the 2014–15 season, Frazar had 10 events to earn 332.25 FedEx Cup points or $548,236 to retain his PGA Tour card. Frazar made three cuts in seven events that season and entered 2015–16 with three events to earn 320 FedEx Cup points or $510,686 to retain his Tour card.

In 2015, Frazar retired. He returned to the PGA Tour in 2021 on a Major Medical Extension, but didn't meet the terms and was demoted to the Past Champions category. He played in three events but did not make the cut in any of them.

In late 2021, after turning 50, Frazar joined the PGA Tour Champions tour. His first win was the 2023 Dominion Energy Charity Classic.

== Professional wins (4) ==
=== PGA Tour wins (1) ===
| No. | Date | Tournament | Winning score | Margin of victory | Runner-up |
|---|---|---|---|---|---|
| 1 | Jun 12, 2011 | FedEx St. Jude Classic | −13 (71-65-64-67=267) | Playoff | (Sweden) Robert Karlsson |

PGA Tour playoff record (1–1)

| No. | Year | Tournament | Opponent | Result |
|---|---|---|---|---|
| 1 | 2004 | Sony Open in Hawaii | (South Africa) Ernie Els | Lost to birdie on third extra hole |
| 2 | 2011 | FedEx St. Jude Classic | (Sweden) Robert Karlsson | Won with par on third extra hole |

=== Nike Tour wins (1) ===
| No. | Date | Tournament | Winning score | Margin of victory | Runner-up |
|---|---|---|---|---|---|
| 1 | May 4, 1997 | Nike South Carolina Classic | −17 (68-69-67-67=271) | 3 strokes | (United States) R. W. Eaks |

=== Other wins (1) ===
| No. | Date | Tournament | Winning score | Margin of victory | Runners-up |
|---|---|---|---|---|---|
| 1 | Nov 20, 2011 | Callaway Pebble Beach Invitational | −9 (69-68-70-72=279) | 1 stroke | (United States) Matt Bettencourt, (United States) Cameron Tringale |

=== PGA Tour Champions wins (1) ===
Legend
Charles Schwab Cup playoff events (1)
Other PGA Tour Champions (0)

| No. | Date | Tournament | Winning score | Margin of victory | Runner-up |
|---|---|---|---|---|---|
| 1 | Oct 22, 2023 | Dominion Energy Charity Classic | −11 (65-71-69=205) | Playoff | (Australia) Richard Green |

PGA Tour Champions playoff record (1–0)

| No. | Year | Tournament | Opponent | Result |
|---|---|---|---|---|
| 1 | 2023 | Dominion Energy Charity Classic | (Australia) Richard Green | Won with birdie on first extra hole |

== Results in major championships ==
| Tournament | 1998 | 1999 |
|---|---|---|
| Masters Tournament | | |
| U.S. Open | | |
| The Open Championship | | |
| PGA Championship | CUT | CUT |

| Tournament | 2000 | 2001 | 2002 | 2003 | 2004 | 2005 | 2006 | 2007 | 2008 | 2009 |
|---|---|---|---|---|---|---|---|---|---|---|
| Masters Tournament | | | | | | | | | | |
| U.S. Open | | T66 | T54 | | | | | T58 | | |
| The Open Championship | | | | | | | | | | |
| PGA Championship | CUT | CUT | | | CUT | | T20 | | | |

| Tournament | 2010 | 2011 | 2012 |
|---|---|---|---|
| Masters Tournament | | | CUT |
| U.S. Open | CUT | T30 | |
| The Open Championship | | 69 | |
| PGA Championship | | T39 | |

Did not play

CUT = missed the half-way cut
"T" = tied

=== Summary ===
| Tournament | Wins | 2nd | 3rd | Top-5 | Top-10 | Top-25 | Events | Cuts made |
|---|---|---|---|---|---|---|---|---|
| Masters Tournament | 0 | 0 | 0 | 0 | 0 | 0 | 1 | 0 |
| U.S. Open | 0 | 0 | 0 | 0 | 0 | 0 | 5 | 4 |
| The Open Championship | 0 | 0 | 0 | 0 | 0 | 0 | 1 | 1 |
| PGA Championship | 0 | 0 | 0 | 0 | 0 | 1 | 7 | 2 |
| Totals | 0 | 0 | 0 | 0 | 0 | 1 | 14 | 7 |

- Most consecutive cuts made – 3 (2011 U.S. Open – 2011 PGA)
- Longest streak of top-10s – 0

== Results in The Players Championship ==
| Tournament | 1999 | 2000 | 2001 | 2002 | 2003 | 2004 | 2005 | 2006 | 2007 | 2008 | 2009 | 2010 | 2011 | 2012 |
|---|---|---|---|---|---|---|---|---|---|---|---|---|---|---|
| The Players Championship | CUT | T33 | CUT | T44 | CUT | CUT | CUT | T63 | T52 | | | CUT | | T46 |

Did not play

CUT = missed the halfway cut
"T" indicates a tie for a place

== Results in World Golf Championships ==
| Tournament | 2011 |
|---|---|
| Match Play | |
| Championship | |
| Invitational | T66 |
| Champions | T29 |

Did not play

"T" = Tied

== See also ==
- 1997 Nike Tour graduates
- 2008 PGA Tour Qualifying School graduates
