= Chris DiMarco =

American professional golfer (born 1968)

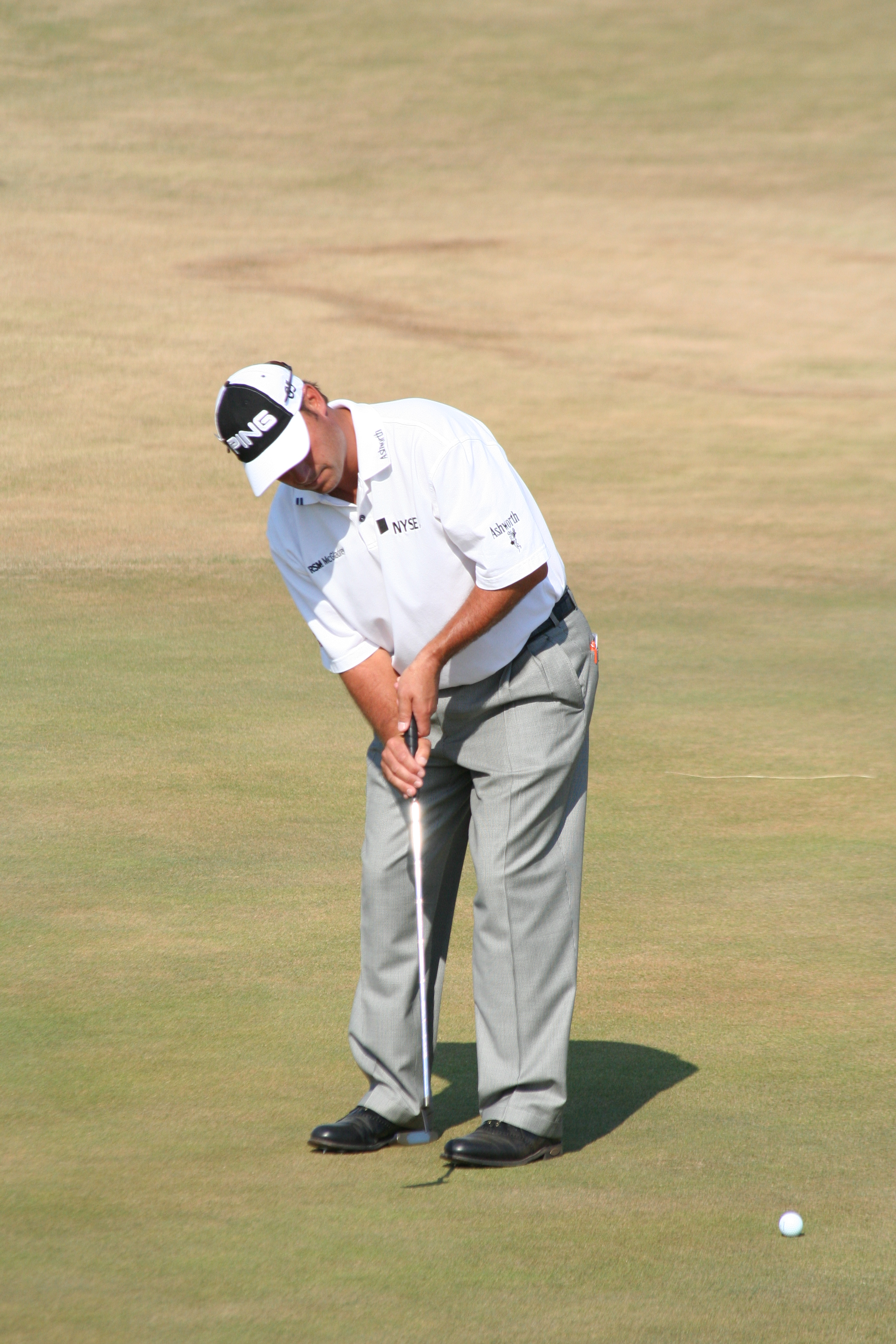
- DiMarco at the 2006 Open Championship

Personal information
- Full name: Christian Dean DiMarco
- Nationality: United States
- Born: August 23, 1968 (age 58) Huntington, New York, U.S.
- Height: 6 ft 0 in (1.83 m)
- Weight: 180 lb (82 kg; 13 st)
- Spouse: Amy Curtis DiMarco (m. 1991)
- Children: 3

Career
- Sport: Golf
- College: Florida
- Turned professional: 1990
- Current tour: PGA Tour Champions
- Former tours: PGA Tour; Web.com Tour; Canadian Tour
- Professional wins: 8
- Highest ranking: 6 (May 8, 2005)

Number of wins by tour
- PGA Tour: 3
- European Tour: 1
- Korn Ferry Tour: 1
- Other: 3

Best results in major championships
- Masters Tournament: 2nd: 2005
- PGA Championship: T2: 2004
- U.S. Open: T9: 2004
- The Open Championship: 2nd: 2006

Achievements and awards
- Canadian Tour Order of Merit winner: 1992

Christian Dean DiMarco (born August 23, 1968) is an American professional golfer who plays on the PGA Tour Champions. DiMarco has won eight tournaments as a pro, including three PGA Tour events.

== Early life ==
Born in Huntington, New York, DiMarco moved to Florida with his family at age seven. He attended Lake Brantley High School in Altamonte Springs, where he played for the Patriots golf team and began dating his future wife at the age of 17. DiMarco was raised in a sports-oriented family; both of his older brothers were athletes, and his father played college basketball for St. John's University. DiMarco's nephew Patrick DiMarco is a professional football player.

== Amateur career ==
DiMarco accepted an athletic scholarship to the University of Florida in Gainesville, where he played for coach Lynn Blevins and coach Buddy Alexander's Gator golf teams from 1987 to 1990. He shot a three-round score of 209 to win the Southeastern Conference (SEC) individual title in 1989, while leading the Gators to an SEC team championship. He also was a seven-time medalist, a first-team All-SEC selection in 1989 and 1990, the SEC Player of the Year in 1990, and an All-American in 1988, 1989 and 1990.

== Professional career ==
DiMarco turned professional in 1990, won the Canadian Tour's Order of Merit as its money leader in 1992, and finished ninth on the second-tier Nike Tour in 1993 to earn his PGA Tour card for 1994. However, he was not always able to maintain his place on the PGA Tour, and he won his first professional tournament on the Nike Tour at the 1997 Nike Ozarks Open. As he moved into his 30s, he continued to improve, capturing his first trophy on the PGA Tour at the 2000 SEI Pennsylvania Classic.

His second PGA Tour victory was the 2001 Buick Challenge, where he sank a 15-foot (4.6 m) birdie on the 18th hole to tie leader David Duval, and then won on the first hole of a sudden death playoff. He won his third PGA Tour event at the 2002 Phoenix Open, which featured an infamous moment—as DiMarco was addressing a pressure putt at TPC Scottsdale's 16th hole, one of the fans yelled "Noonan!" (a reference from the movie Caddyshack). DiMarco maintained his concentration and sank the putt, then pointed at the fan and demanded that a tournament official eject him. By 2004, he had finished in the top twenty on the PGA Tour money list for five straight seasons, and had tied for second in the PGA Championship, losing the title to Vijay Singh in a three-way playoff.

In 2005, DiMarco lost a sudden-death playoff with Tiger Woods to finish second in The Masters. The final round pairing of Woods and DiMarco featured a famous chip from Woods which took an incredibly long time to drop into the hole for a birdie on the par three 16th, and stretch his lead to two. The Masters result moved DiMarco into the top ten of the Official World Golf Rankings. DiMarco finished as the runner-up in a major for the third time at the 2006 Open Championship at Hoylake; Tiger Woods beating him by two strokes. DiMarco achieved his four-round score of 70-65-69-68 (272, −16) less than three weeks after the death of his mother.

Arguably, DiMarco enjoyed his most consistent success from 2002 to 2006, when he was ranked in the top ten of the world rankings for 61 weeks, going as high as number six in the world in 2005. DiMarco was also a member of the U.S. national team in the 2003 and 2005 Presidents Cup, and the Ryder Cup competitions in 2004 and 2006. DiMarco sank a 15-foot (4.6 m) putt to beat Stuart Appleby and clinch the 2005 Presidents Cup.

In 2007, he disclosed that he was suffering from a chronic shoulder injury, and underwent arthroscopic surgery on his left shoulder later that year. Notwithstanding the injury, DiMarco still finished among the top 25 in six tournaments and earned more than $950,000 in fewer than nine months in 2007.

DiMarco has not played a full PGA Tour schedule since 2012. He is a frequent contributor to Morning Drive on Golf Channel.

== Personal life ==
DiMarco has known his wife Amy (née Curtis) since the seventh grade, when both attended Rock Lake Middle School in Longwood. Later, both were students at Lake Brantley High School, and attended their high school prom together. They have three children—two daughters and a son. His son, Cristian DiMarco, was a member of the University of South Florida golf team, after transferring from Kentucky. Cristian turned professional in 2018.

DiMarco hosts his own annual charity golf tournament at his local course, Heathrow Country Club in Heathrow, Florida. The "Norma DiMarco Tee Up For Life Golf Tournament" is named in honor of his mother. It raises funds for R.O.C.K (Reaching Out to Cancer Kids), and features celebrities and amateurs. As part of his personal participation in the event, DiMarco plays the 12th hole with every foursome in the tournament.

== Awards and honors ==
DiMarco was inducted into the University of Florida Athletic Hall of Fame as a "Gator Great" in 2002.

== Amateur wins ==
- 1988 Monroe Invitational, Western Amateur

== Professional wins (8) ==
=== PGA Tour wins (3) ===
No.	Date	Tournament	Winning score	To par	Margin of victory	Runner(s)-up
1	Sep 17, 2000	SEI Pennsylvania Classic	68-67-66-69=270	−14	6 strokes	(United States) Mark Calcavecchia, (United States) Brad Elder, (United States) Scott Hoch, (United States) Jonathan Kaye, (United States) Chris Perry
2	Oct 28, 2001	Buick Challenge	67-64-71-65=267	−21	Playoff	(United States) David Duval
3	Jan 27, 2002	Phoenix Open	68-64-66-69=267	−17	1 stroke	(United States) Kenny Perry, (Japan) Kaname Yokoo

PGA Tour playoff record (1–2)

No.	Year	Tournament	Opponent(s)	Result
1	2001	Buick Challenge	(United States) David Duval	Won with par on first extra hole
2	2004	PGA Championship	(United States) Justin Leonard, (Fiji) Vijay Singh	Singh won three-hole aggregate playoff; Singh: −1 (3-3-4=10), DiMarco: x (4-3-x=x), Leonard: x (4-3-x=x)
3	2005	Masters Tournament	(United States) Tiger Woods	Lost to birdie on first extra hole

=== European Tour wins (1) ===
No.	Date	Tournament	Winning score	To par	Margin of victory	Runner-up
1	Jan 22, 2006	Abu Dhabi Golf Championship	71-67-63-67=268	−20	1 stroke	(Sweden) Henrik Stenson

European Tour playoff record (0–2)

No.	Year	Tournament	Opponent(s)	Result
1	2004	PGA Championship	(United States) Justin Leonard, (Fiji) Vijay Singh	Singh won three-hole aggregate playoff; Singh: −1 (3-3-4=10), DiMarco: x (4-3-x=x), Leonard: x (4-3-x=x)
2	2005	Masters Tournament	(United States) Tiger Woods	Lost to birdie on first extra hole

=== Nike Tour wins (1) ===
No.	Date	Tournament	Winning score	To par	Margin of victory	Runner-up
1	Aug 17, 1997	Nike Ozarks Open	66-70-68=204 (Note: Shortened to 54 holes due to weather.)	−12	1 stroke	(United States) Robin Freeman

Nike Tour playoff record (0–1)

No.	Year	Tournament	Opponent	Result
1	1993	Nike Yuma Open	(United States) Ron Streck	Lost to par on second extra hole

=== Canadian Tour wins (1) ===
No.	Date	Tournament	Winning score	To par	Margin of victory	Runner-up
1	Aug 18, 1996	Montclair Quebec Open	67-65-65-69=266	−18	1 stroke	(United States) Duane Bock

=== Other wins (2) ===
No.	Date	Tournament	Winning score	To par	Margin of victory	Runners-up
1	Jun 25, 2002	CVS Charity Classic (with (United States) Dudley Hart)	60-62=122	−20	Playoff	(United States) Stewart Cink and (United States) David Toms
2	Jun 28, 2005	CVS Charity Classic (2) (with (United States) Fred Funk)	61-62=123	−19	2 strokes	(United States) Brad Faxon and (Spain) Sergio García, (United States) Brett Quigley and (United States) Dana Quigley

Other playoff record (1–0)

No.	Year	Tournament	Opponents	Result
1	2002	CVS Charity Classic (with (United States) Dudley Hart)	(United States) Stewart Cink and (United States) David Toms	Won with birdie on third extra hole

== Results in major championships ==
Tournament	1998	1999	2000	2001	2002	2003	2004	2005	2006	2007	2008
Masters Tournament				T10	T12	WD	T6	2	CUT	CUT	
U.S. Open	T32			T16	T24	T35	T9	CUT	CUT	T45	
The Open Championship			CUT	T47	T66	CUT	T63	T67	2	T23	
PGA Championship		T41	T15	T16	T39	56	T2	CUT	T12	CUT	T31

Top 10
Did not play

WD = withdrew
CUT = missed the half-way cut
"T" = tied for place

=== Summary ===
Tournament	Wins	2nd	3rd	Top-5	Top-10	Top-25	Events	Cuts made
Masters Tournament	0	1	0	1	3	4	7	4
U.S. Open	0	0	0	0	1	3	8	6
The Open Championship	0	1	0	1	1	2	8	6
PGA Championship	0	1	0	1	1	4	10	8
Totals	0	3	0	3	6	13	33	24

- Most consecutive cuts made – 9 (2000 PGA – 2002 PGA)
- Longest streak of top-10s – 2 (twice)

== Results in The Players Championship ==
Tournament	1995	1996	1997	1998	1999
The Players Championship	CUT				T46

Tournament	2000	2001	2002	2003	2004	2005	2006	2007	2008
The Players Championship	CUT	T55	T36	T21	CUT	CUT			T54

Did not play

CUT = missed the halfway cut
"T" indicates a tie for a place

== Results in World Golf Championships ==
Tournament	2000	2001	2002	2003	2004	2005	2006	2007
Match Play		R64	R32	R64	R16	2	R16	R32
Championship	T25	NT^{1}	T11	T70	T36	T64	T22	T32
Invitational			T28	T33	T6	2	T27	T4

^{1}Cancelled due to 9/11

Top 10
Did not play

QF, R16, R32, R64 = Round in which player lost in match play
"T" = tied
NT = No Tournament

== Results in senior major championships ==
Results not in chronological order

Tournament	2019	2020	2021	2022	2023	2024	2025	2026
Senior PGA Championship	CUT	NT	CUT	T29	T31	T6	CUT	CUT
The Tradition	65	NT	T56	T33	T59	T44	T5	73
U.S. Senior Open	T6	NT	CUT	CUT			CUT	
Senior Players Championship	T69	T56	T58	74	T64	T33	T63	73
Senior British Open Championship	T42	NT			CUT		CUT	CUT

Top 10
Did not play

"T" indicates a tie for a place
CUT = missed the halfway cut
NT = no tournament due to COVID-19 pandemic

== U.S. national team appearances ==
Professional

- Presidents Cup: 2003 (tie), 2005 (winners)
- Ryder Cup: 2004, 2006
- Wendy's 3-Tour Challenge (representing PGA Tour): 2007

== See also ==
- 1993 Nike Tour graduates
- 1997 Nike Tour graduates
- List of American Ryder Cup golfers
- List of Florida Gators men's golfers on the PGA Tour
- List of University of Florida Athletic Hall of Fame members
