= 1992 Masters Tournament =

American golf tournament held in 1992

- Front cover of the 1992 Masters Journal

Tournament information
- Dates: April 9–12, 1992
- Location: Augusta, Georgia; 33.503°N 82.020°W
- Course: Augusta National Golf Club
- Organized by: Augusta National Golf Club
- Tour: PGA Tour

Statistics
- Par: 72
- Length: 6,905 yards (6,314 m)
- Field: 83 players, 63 after cut
- Cut: 145 (+1)
- Prize fund: US$1.5 million
- Winner's share: $270,000

Champion
- (United States) Fred Couples
- 275 (−13)
- Location in the United States Location in Georgia

The 1992 Masters Tournament was the 56th Masters Tournament, held April 9–12 at Augusta National Golf Club in Augusta, Georgia.

Fred Couples won his only major championship, two strokes ahead of 49-year-old runner-up Raymond Floyd, the 1976 champion. He was the first American winner in five years at Augusta, the longest run at the Masters without a winner from the U.S.; the previous four were won by players from Europe, all from the United Kingdom. Though he had yet to win a major, Couples entered this Masters at age 32 as the world's top-ranked player and the odds-on favorite.

The 36-hole cut at 145 (+1) eliminated only twenty competitors and 63 played on the weekend, the most since 1966. The Masters did not have a cut until its 21st edition in 1957. George Archer, the 1969 champion, made the cut in his final Masters at age 52 and finished in 51st place.

Less than an hour after the leaders teed off on Saturday afternoon, thunderstorms caused a delay of nearly three hours. Six players did not finish the third round due to darkness, but the pairing just ahead, Ian Baker-Finch and Jeff Sluman, ran between their shots on the final two holes and completed the round. The three pairings returned early on Sunday morning to complete the round; Couples and Floyd were in the penultimate pairing and had four holes remaining. Early in the final round, Mark Calcavecchia shot a record 29 (−7) on the back nine with birdies at 10 and the final six holes; he finished ten strokes back.

Davis Love III won the 33rd Par 3 contest on Wednesday with a score of 22.

== Course ==
Hole	Name	Yards	Par	Hole	Name	Yards	Par
1	Tea Olive	400	4	10	Camellia	485	4
2	Pink Dogwood	555	5	11	White Dogwood	455	4
3	Flowering Peach	360	4	12	Golden Bell	155	3
4	Flowering Crab Apple	205	3	13	Azalea	465	5
5	Magnolia	435	4	14	Chinese Fir	405	4
6	Juniper	180	3	15	Firethorn	500	5
7	Pampas	360	4	16	Redbud	170	3
8	Yellow Jasmine	535	5	17	Nandina	400	4
9	Carolina Cherry	435	4	18	Holly	405	4
Out		3,465	36	In		3,440	36
Source:				Total		6,905	72

== Field ==
1. Masters champions

Tommy Aaron, George Archer, Seve Ballesteros (3,9), Gay Brewer, Ben Crenshaw (9), Nick Faldo (3,9,10), Raymond Floyd (9,10,11,12), Doug Ford, Bernhard Langer, Sandy Lyle (10), Larry Mize (9), Jack Nicklaus, Arnold Palmer, Gary Player, Craig Stadler (9,11,12,13), Tom Watson (9,10), Ian Woosnam (13), Fuzzy Zoeller (9,10)

- Jack Burke Jr., Billy Casper, Charles Coody, Bob Goalby, Ben Hogan, Herman Keiser, Cary Middlecoff, Byron Nelson, Henry Picard, Gene Sarazen, Sam Snead, and Art Wall Jr. did not play.

2. U.S. Open champions (last five years)

Hale Irwin (9,10), Scott Simpson (9,10), Payne Stewart (4), Curtis Strange

3. The Open champions (last five years)

Mark Calcavecchia (9,12), Ian Baker-Finch (9,13)

4. PGA champions (last five years)

John Daly (13), Wayne Grady, Larry Nelson (10), Jeff Sluman (13)

5. U.S. Amateur champion and runner-up

Mitch Voges (a), Manny Zerman (a)

6. British Amateur champion

Gary Wolstenholme (a)

7. U.S. Amateur Public Links champion

David Berganio Jr. (a)

8. U.S. Mid-Amateur champion

Jim Stuart (a)

9. Top 24 players and ties from the 1991 Masters

Steve Elkington (12,13), Jim Gallagher Jr. (10,11,13), Peter Jacobsen, Andrew Magee (12,13), Billy Mayfair, Mark McCumber, Rocco Mediate (13), Jodie Mudd, Tsuneyuki Nakajima, José María Olazábal (10,12), Steve Pate (11,12,13), Corey Pavin (10,12,13), Lanny Wadkins (13)

10. Top 16 players and ties from the 1991 U.S. Open

Fred Couples (12,13), Nolan Henke (13), Davis Love III (12,13), Craig Parry, D. A. Weibring (12,13)

- Scott Hoch (13) did not play.

11. Top eight players and ties from 1991 PGA Championship

David Feherty, Bob Gilder, John Huston, Kenny Knox, Bruce Lietzke (13), Steven Richardson, Hal Sutton

12. Winners of PGA Tour events since the previous Masters

Fulton Allem, Billy Andrade (13), Chip Beck (13), Mark Brooks (13), Billy Ray Brown, Russ Cochran (13), John Cook (13), Brad Faxon, Bruce Fleisher, Mike Hulbert (13), Lee Janzen, Blaine McCallister, Mark O'Meara (13), David Peoples, Kenny Perry, Nick Price (13), Dillard Pruitt, Tom Purtzer (13)

13. Top 30 players from the 1991 PGA Tour money list

Paul Azinger, Jay Don Blake, Ted Schulz

14. Special foreign invitation

Rodger Davis, Colin Montgomerie, Greg Norman, Naomichi Ozaki

== Round summaries ==
=== First round ===
Thursday, April 9, 1992

Larry Nelson, who scored 73, was disqualified after the first round for playing with non-conforming clubs. Nelson had played with irons which had a decorative design on the clubface. He reported himself, after being informed that they might be illegal.

Place	Player	Score	To par
T1	(United States) Jeff Sluman	65	−7
T1	(United States) Lanny Wadkins	65	−7
T3	(Australia) Wayne Grady	68	−4
T3	(United States) Mike Hulbert	68	−4
T3	(United States) Davis Love III	68	−4
T3	(United States) Ted Schulz	68	−4
T7	(South Africa) Fulton Allem	69	−3
T7	(United States) Fred Couples	69	−3
T7	(Australia) Steve Elkington	69	−3
T7	(United States) Raymond Floyd	69	−3
T7	(United States) John Huston	69	−3
T7	(Germany) Bernhard Langer	69	−3
T7	(United States) Bruce Lietzke	69	−3
T7	(United States) Jodie Mudd	69	−3
T7	(United States) Jack Nicklaus	69	−3
T7	(Australia) Craig Parry	69	−3
T7	(England) Steven Richardson	69	−3
T7	(Wales) Ian Woosnam	69	−3

=== Second round ===
Friday, April 10, 1992

Place	Player	Score	To par
T1	(Australia) Craig Parry	69-66=135	−9
T1	(Wales) Ian Woosnam	69-66=135	−9
3	(United States) Fred Couples	69-67=136	−8
T4	(United States) Raymond Floyd	69-68=137	−7
T4	(United States) Ted Schulz	68-69=137	−7
T6	(Australia) Ian Baker-Finch	70-69=139	−5
T6	(United States) Jeff Sluman	65-74=139	−5
T6	(United States) D. A. Weibring	71-68=139	−5
T9	(South Africa) Fulton Allem	69-71=140	−4
T9	(Australia) Steve Elkington	69-71=140	−4
T9	(United States) Davis Love III	68-72=140	−4
T9	(Australia) Greg Norman	70-70=140	−4
T9	(United States) Lanny Wadkins	65-75=140	−4

Amateurs: Zerman (−3), Berganio Jr. (+3), Voges (+4), Wolstenholme (+7), Stuart (+14)

=== Third round ===
Saturday, April 11, 1992
Sunday, April 12, 1992

Place	Player	Score	To par
1	(Australia) Craig Parry	69-66-69=204	−12
2	(United States) Fred Couples	69-67-69=205	−11
3	(United States) Raymond Floyd	69-68-69=206	−10
4	(Australia) Ian Baker-Finch	70-69-68=207	−9
T5	(Zimbabwe) Nick Price	70-71-67=208	−8
T5	(Wales) Ian Woosnam	69-66-73=208	−8
T7	(United States) Bruce Lietzke	69-72-68=209	−7
T7	(United States) Ted Schulz	68-69-72=209	−7
T7	(United States) Jeff Sluman	65-74-70=209	−7
10	(United States) Mark O'Meara	74-67-69=210	−6

=== Final round ===
Sunday, April 12, 1992

==== Final leaderboard ====
Champion
Silver Cup winner (low amateur)
(a) = amateur
(c) = past champion

Top 10
Place	Player	Score	To par	Money (US$)
1	(United States) Fred Couples	69-67-69-70=275	−13	270,000
2	(United States) Raymond Floyd (c)	69-68-69-71=277	−11	162,000
3	(United States) Corey Pavin	72-71-68-67=278	−10	102,000
T4	(United States) Mark O'Meara	74-67-69-70=280	−8	66,000
T4	(United States) Jeff Sluman	65-74-70-71=280	−8	66,000
T6	(Australia) Ian Baker-Finch	70-69-68-74=281	−7	43,829
T6	(United States) Nolan Henke	70-71-70-70=281	−7	43,829
T6	(United States) Larry Mize (c)	73-69-71-68=281	−7	43,829
T6	(Australia) Greg Norman	70-70-73-68=281	−7	43,829
T6	(United States) Steve Pate	73-71-70-67=281	−7	43,829
T6	(Zimbabwe) Nick Price	70-71-67-73=281	−7	43,829
T6	(United States) Ted Schulz	68-69-72-72=281	−7	43,829

Leaderboard below the top 10
Place	Player	Score	To par	Money ($)
T13	(England) Nick Faldo (c)	71-72-68-71=282	−6	26,500
T13	(Australia) Wayne Grady	68-75-71-68=282	−6	26,500
T13	(United States) Bruce Lietzke	69-72-68-73=282	−6	26,500
T13	(Australia) Craig Parry	69-66-69-78=282	−6	26,500
T13	(United States) Dillard Pruitt	75-68-70-69=282	−6	26,500
T13	(United States) Scott Simpson	70-71-71-70=282	−6	26,500
T19	(United States) Billy Ray Brown	70-74-70-69=283	−5	17,550
T19	(United States) John Daly	71-71-73-68=283	−5	17,550
T19	(United States) Mike Hulbert	68-74-71-70=283	−5	17,550
T19	(United States) Andrew Magee	73-70-70-70=283	−5	17,550
T19	(Wales) Ian Woosnam (c)	69-66-73-75=283	−5	17,550
T19	(United States) Fuzzy Zoeller (c)	71-70-73-69=283	−5	17,550
T25	(United States) Bruce Fleisher	73-70-72-69=284	−4	11,467
T25	(United States) Jim Gallagher Jr.	74-68-71-71=284	−4	11,467
T25	(United States) John Huston	69-73-73-69=284	−4	11,467
T25	(United States) Davis Love III	68-72-72-72=284	−4	11,467
T25	(United States) Craig Stadler (c)	70-71-70-73=284	−4	11,467
T25	(United States) D. A. Weibring	71-68-72-73=284	−4	11,467
T31	(United States) Paul Azinger	70-73-70-72=285	−3	8,717
T31	(United States) Mark Calcavecchia	73-72-75-65=285	−3	8,717
T31	(United States) Brad Faxon	71-71-69-74=285	−3	8,717
T31	(Germany) Bernhard Langer (c)	69-73-69-74=285	−3	8,717
T31	(England) Steven Richardson	69-75-70-71=285	−3	8,717
T31	(United States) Curtis Strange	73-72-71-69=285	−3	8,717
T37	(Australia) Steve Elkington	69-71-74-72=286	−2	6,800
T37	(Scotland) Sandy Lyle (c)	72-69-70-75=286	−2	6,800
T37	(United States) Mark McCumber	72-70-76-68=286	−2	6,800
T37	(United States) Rocco Mediate	70-73-70-73=286	−2	6,800
T37	(Scotland) Colin Montgomerie	72-71-73-70=286	−2	6,800
T42	(United States) Bob Gilder	72-71-73-71=287	−1	5,450
T42	(United States) Billy Mayfair	71-71-72-73=287	−1	5,450
T42	(United States) Jack Nicklaus (c)	69-75-69-74=287	−1	5,450
T42	(Spain) José María Olazábal	76-69-72-70=287	−1	5,450
46	(United States) Ben Crenshaw (c)	72-71-71-74=288	E	4,700
47	(United States) Hale Irwin	72-70-72-75=289	+1	4,400
T48	(United States) Blaine McCallister	71-71-76-72=290	+2	3,933
T48	(United States) Lanny Wadkins	65-75-76-74=290	+2	3,933
T48	(United States) Tom Watson (c)	73-70-76-71=290	+2	3,933
51	(United States) George Archer (c)	74-69-76-72=291	+3	3,700
T52	(South Africa) Fulton Allem	69-71-78-74=292	+4	3,550
T52	(Northern Ireland) David Feherty	73-72-77-70=292	+4	3,550
T54	(United States) Tommy Aaron (c)	76-69-77-71=293	+5	3,440
T54	(United States) Billy Andrade	73-71-73-76=293	+5	3,440
T54	(United States) John Cook	72-73-71-77=293	+5	3,440
T54	(United States) Lee Janzen	74-71-74-74=293	+5	3,440
T54	(United States) David Peoples	73-71-72-77=293	+5	3,440
T59	(Spain) Seve Ballesteros (c)	75-68-70-81=294	+6	3,300
T59	(South Africa) Manny Zerman (a)	70-71-76-77=294	+6	0
T61	(United States) Peter Jacobsen	72-70-77-76=295	+7	3,300
T61	(United States) Tom Purtzer	76-69-75-75=295	+7	3,300
63	(Australia) Rodger Davis	77-68-77-79=301	+13	3,200
CUT	(United States) Mark Brooks	73-73=146	+2	
CUT	(United States) Kenny Knox	73-73=146	+2	
CUT	(Japan) Tsuneyuki Nakajima	72-74=146	+2	
CUT	(United States) David Berganio Jr. (a)	76-71=147	+3	
CUT	(United States) Jodie Mudd	69-78=147	+3	
CUT	(United States) Chip Beck	76-72=148	+4	
CUT	(United States) Jay Don Blake	73-75=148	+4	
CUT	(United States) Russ Cochran	73-75=148	+4	
CUT	(Japan) Naomichi Ozaki	77-71=148	+4	
CUT	(United States) Arnold Palmer (c)	75-73=148	+4	
CUT	(United States) Kenny Perry	72-76=148	+4	
CUT	(South Africa) Gary Player (c)	75-73=148	+4	
CUT	(United States) Mitch Voges (a)	73-75=148	+4	
CUT	(United States) Payne Stewart	74-75=149	+5	
CUT	(United States) Hal Sutton	76-75=151	+7	
CUT	(England) Gary Wolstenholme (a)	72-79=151	+7	
CUT	(United States) Gay Brewer (c)	81-77=158	+14	
CUT	(United States) Jim Stuart (a)	79-79=158	+14	
CUT	(United States) Doug Ford (c)	82-82=164	+20	
DQ	(United States) Larry Nelson	73	+1	

==== Scorecard ====
Hole	1	2	3	4	5	6	7	8	9	10	11	12	13	14	15	16	17	18
Par	4	5	4	3	4	3	4	5	4	4	4	3	5	4	5	3	4	4
(United States) Couples	−11	−10	−11	−11	−10	−10	−10	−11	−12	−12	−12	−12	−12	−13	−13	−13	−13	−13
(United States) Floyd	−9	−9	−9	−9	−9	−10	−10	−11	−11	−10	−10	−9	−9	−10	−11	−11	−11	−11
(United States) Pavin	−5	−5	−6	−6	−7	−7	−8	−8	−8	−8	−7	−7	−8	−8	−9	−10	−10	−10
(United States) O'Meara	−6	−7	−7	−7	−6	−5	−5	−5	−5	−5	−4	−4	−6	−6	−7	−8	−8	−8
(United States) Sluman	−7	−6	−6	−6	−6	−6	−6	−7	−7	−7	−6	−6	−8	−8	−8	−8	−8	−8
(Australia) Baker-Finch	−10	−10	−9	−9	−8	−8	−8	−8	−8	−7	−7	−6	−6	−6	−7	−7	−7	−7
(Australia) Parry	−12	−13	−12	−11	−10	−10	−9	−9	−9	−8	−8	−8	−8	−8	−8	−7	−7	−6
(England) Faldo	−6	−7	−7	−7	−7	−7	−7	−8	−8	−7	−7	−5	−5	−5	−6	−6	−6	−6
(Wales) Woosnam	−8	−8	−7	−7	−6	−6	−5	−6	−6	−5	−5	−3	−5	−6	−7	−6	−6	−5
(United States) Calcavecchia	+4	+4	+4	+4	+5	+5	+5	+4	+4	+3	+3	+3	+2	+1	E	−1	−2	−3

Cumulative tournament scores, relative to par

Eagle	Birdie	Bogey	Double bogey
