= 1993 Masters Tournament =

American golf tournament held in 1993

- Front cover of the 1993 Masters Journal

Tournament information
- Dates: April 8–11, 1993
- Location: Augusta, Georgia; 33.503°N 82.020°W
- Course: Augusta National Golf Club
- Organized by: Augusta National Golf Club
- Tour: PGA Tour

Statistics
- Par: 72
- Length: 6,905 yards (6,314 m)
- Field: 90 players, 61 after cut
- Cut: 147 (+3)
- Prize fund: US$1.7 million
- Winner's share: $306,000

Champion
- (Germany) Bernhard Langer
- 277 (−11)
- Location in the United States Location in Georgia

The 1993 Masters Tournament was the 57th Masters Tournament, held April 8–11 at Augusta National Golf Club. Bernhard Langer won his second Masters championship, four strokes ahead of runner-up Chip Beck.

Heavy rains on Friday afternoon caused a delay and the second round was not completed until Saturday morning. Jeff Maggert was the leader in the clubhouse at 137 (−7) while Langer was at six-under after sixteen holes when darkness suspended play. Langer, the 1985 champion, finished that round with pars and then forged a four-shot lead with a 69 in the third round to equal the best round of the day. Tied for second were Beck and Dan Forsman.

On Sunday, Forsman got within one shot of Langer, but found the water twice at the par-3 12th and the quadruple bogey ended his chances. Langer was even par for the round through twelve holes, then eagled the par-5 13th. Playing in the final pairing with Langer, Beck trailed by three shots at the par-5 15th, chose to lay up, missed the green, and scrambled for par. Langer made birdie for a comfortable lead, which extended to five strokes after Beck bogeyed 16.

None of the five amateurs made the cut; Justin Leonard was the closest at 149 (+5), two strokes shy.

== Course ==
Hole	Name	Yards	Par	Hole	Name	Yards	Par
1	Tea Olive	400	4	10	Camellia	485	4
2	Pink Dogwood	555	5	11	White Dogwood	455	4
3	Flowering Peach	360	4	12	Golden Bell	155	3
4	Flowering Crab Apple	205	3	13	Azalea	465	5
5	Magnolia	435	4	14	Chinese Fir	405	4
6	Juniper	180	3	15	Firethorn	500	5
7	Pampas	360	4	16	Redbud	170	3
8	Yellow Jasmine	535	5	17	Nandina	400	4
9	Carolina Cherry	435	4	18	Holly	405	4
Out		3,465	36	In		3,440	36
Source:				Total		6,905	72

== Field ==
1. Masters champions

Tommy Aaron, Seve Ballesteros (3), Gay Brewer, Billy Casper, Charles Coody, Fred Couples (12,13), Ben Crenshaw (12), Nick Faldo (3,9,10,11), Raymond Floyd (9,13), Doug Ford, Bernhard Langer, Sandy Lyle, Larry Mize (9,12), Jack Nicklaus, Arnold Palmer, Gary Player, Craig Stadler (12,13), Tom Watson, Ian Woosnam (9,10), Fuzzy Zoeller (9)

- George Archer, Jack Burke Jr., Bob Goalby, Ben Hogan, Herman Keiser, Cary Middlecoff, Byron Nelson, Henry Picard, Gene Sarazen, Sam Snead, and Art Wall Jr. did not play.

2. U.S. Open champions (last five years)

Hale Irwin, Tom Kite (12,13), Payne Stewart (4), Curtis Strange

3. The Open champions (last five years)

Mark Calcavecchia, Ian Baker-Finch (9,10)

4. PGA champions (last five years)

John Daly (9,12), Wayne Grady (9), Nick Price (9,10,12,13), Jeff Sluman (9,10,13)

5. U.S. Amateur champion and runner-up

Justin Leonard (a)

- Tom Scherrer forfeited his exemption by turning professional

6. The British Amateur champion

Stephen Dundas (a)

7. U.S. Amateur Public Links champion

Warren Schutte (a)

8. U.S. Mid-Amateur champion

Danny Yates (a)

9. Top 24 players and ties from the 1992 Masters

Billy Ray Brown (12,13), Nolan Henke, Mike Hulbert (10), Bruce Lietzke (12,13), Andrew Magee, Greg Norman (12,13), Mark O'Meara (13), Craig Parry, Steve Pate (13), Corey Pavin (13), Dillard Pruitt, Ted Schulz, Scott Simpson

10. Top 16 players and ties from the 1992 U.S. Open

Billy Andrade, Jay Don Blake, John Cook (11,12,13), Bob Gilder, Tom Lehman (13), Mark McCumber, Colin Montgomerie, Gil Morgan, Joey Sindelar

11. Top eight players and ties from 1992 PGA Championship

Russ Cochran, Dan Forsman (12,13), Jim Gallagher Jr. (13), Jeff Maggert, Gene Sauers

12. Winners of PGA Tour events since the previous Masters

Paul Azinger (13), Mark Carnevale, David Edwards (13), Brad Faxon (13), David Frost (13), Fred Funk, Bill Glasson, Jay Haas (13), Gary Hallberg, John Huston (13), Lee Janzen (13), Davis Love III (13), Phil Mickelson, Brett Ogle, David Peoples (13), Mike Standly, Howard Twitty, Lanny Wadkins, Richard Zokol

13. Top 30 players from the 1992 PGA Tour money list

Chip Beck, Mark Brooks, Keith Clearwater, Steve Elkington, Duffy Waldorf

14. Special foreign invitation

Anders Forsbrand, Tony Johnstone, José María Olazábal, Masashi Ozaki, Naomichi Ozaki

== Round summaries ==
=== First round ===
Thursday, April 8, 1993

Place	Player	Score	To par
T1	(United States) Lee Janzen	67	−5
T1	(United States) Tom Lehman	67	−5
T1	(United States) Larry Mize	67	−5
T1	(United States) Jack Nicklaus	67	−5
T1	(United States) Corey Pavin	67	−5
T6	(United States) Raymond Floyd	68	−4
T6	(United States) John Huston	68	−4
T6	(Germany) Bernhard Langer	68	−4
T9	(United States) Dan Forsman	69	−3
T9	(United States) Bob Gilder	69	−3
T9	(Australia) Craig Parry	69	−3
T9	(United States) Ted Schulz	69	−3
T9	(United States) Lanny Wadkins	69	−3

=== Second round ===
Friday, April 9, 1993
Saturday, April 10, 1993

Place	Player	Score	To par
1	(United States) Jeff Maggert	70-67=137	−7
T2	(United States) Dan Forsman	69-69=138	−6
T2	(Germany) Bernhard Langer	68-70=138	−6
T4	(United States) Chip Beck	72-67=139	−5
T4	(United States) Russ Cochran	70-69=139	−5
T4	(United States) Raymond Floyd	68-71=139	−5
7	(United States) Lee Janzen	67-73=140	−4
T8	(United States) Mark Calcavecchia	71-70=141	−3
T8	(United States) John Daly	70-71=141	−3
T8	(Australia) Steve Elkington	71-70=141	−3
T8	(United States) Brad Faxon	71-70=141	−3
T8	(United States) Larry Mize	67-74=141	−3
T8	(Australia) Craig Parry	69-72=141	−3
T8	(United States) Joey Sindelar	72-69=141	−3
T8	(United States) Howard Twitty	70-71=141	−3
T8	(United States) Lanny Wadkins	69-72=141	−3

Amateurs: Leonard (+5), Schutte (+8), Yates (+11), Dundas (+17)

=== Third round ===
Saturday, April 10, 1993

Place	Player	Score	To par
1	(Germany) Bernhard Langer	68-70-69=207	−9
T2	(United States) Chip Beck	72-67-72=211	−5
T2	(United States) Dan Forsman	69-69-73=211	−5
T4	(United States) Russ Cochran	70-69-73=212	−4
T4	(Australia) Steve Elkington	71-70-71=212	−4
T4	(United States) Jeff Maggert	70-67-75=212	−4
T4	(United States) Lanny Wadkins	69-72-71=212	−4
T8	(United States) Brad Faxon	71-70-72=213	−3
T8	(United States) Raymond Floyd	68-71-74=213	−3
T8	(Australia) Greg Norman	74-68-71=213	−3
T8	(United States) Fuzzy Zoeller	75-67-71=213	−3

=== Final round ===
Sunday, April 11, 1993

==== Final leaderboard ====
Champion
(a) = amateur
(c) = past champion

Top 10
Place	Player	Score	To par	Money (US$)
1	(Germany) Bernhard Langer (c)	68-70-69-70=277	−11	306,000
2	(United States) Chip Beck	72-67-72-70=281	−7	183,600
T3	(United States) John Daly	70-71-73-69=283	−5	81,600
T3	(Australia) Steve Elkington	71-70-71-71=283	−5	81,600
T3	(United States) Tom Lehman	67-75-73-68=283	−5	81,600
T3	(United States) Lanny Wadkins	69-72-71-71=283	−5	81,600
T7	(United States) Dan Forsman	69-69-73-73=284	−4	54,850
T7	(Spain) José María Olazábal	70-72-74-68=284	−4	54,850
T9	(United States) Brad Faxon	71-70-72-72=285	−3	47,600
T9	(United States) Payne Stewart	74-70-72-69=285	−3	47,600

Leaderboard below the top 10
Place	Player	Score	To par	Money ($)
T11	(Spain) Seve Ballesteros (c)	74-70-71-71=286	−2	34,850
T11	(United States) Raymond Floyd (c)	68-71-74-73=286	−2	34,850
T11	(Sweden) Anders Forsbrand	71-74-75-66=286	−2	34,850
T11	(United States) Corey Pavin	67-75-73-71=286	−2	34,850
T11	(United States) Scott Simpson	72-71-71-72=286	−2	34,850
T11	(United States) Fuzzy Zoeller (c)	75-67-71-73=286	−2	34,850
T17	(United States) Mark Calcavecchia	71-70-74-72=287	−1	24,650
T17	(United States) Jeff Sluman	71-72-71-73=287	−1	24,650
T17	(United States) Howard Twitty	70-71-73-73=287	−1	24,650
T17	(Wales) Ian Woosnam (c)	71-74-73-69=287	−1	24,650
T21	(United States) Russ Cochran	70-69-73-76=288	E	17,000
T21	(United States) Fred Couples (c)	72-70-74-72=288	E	17,000
T21	(Scotland) Sandy Lyle (c)	73-71-71-73=288	E	17,000
T21	(United States) Jeff Maggert	70-67-75-76=288	E	17,000
T21	(United States) Larry Mize (c)	67-74-74-73=288	E	17,000
T21	(United States) Mark O'Meara	75-69-73-71=288	E	17,000
T27	(United States) Nolan Henke	76-69-71-73=289	+1	12,350
T27	(United States) Hale Irwin	74-69-74-72=289	+1	12,350
T27	(United States) Jack Nicklaus (c)	67-75-76-71=289	+1	12,350
T27	(United States) Joey Sindelar	72-69-76-72=289	+1	12,350
T31	(United States) Bruce Lietzke	74-71-71-74=290	+2	10,533
T31	(United States) Andrew Magee	75-69-70-76=290	+2	10,533
T31	(Australia) Greg Norman	74-68-71-77=290	+2	10,533
T34	(United States) Bob Gilder	69-76-75-71=291	+3	8,975
T34	(United States) Phil Mickelson	72-71-75-73=291	+3	8,975
T34	(United States) Gene Sauers	74-71-75-71=291	+3	8,975
T34	(United States) Craig Stadler (c)	73-74-69-75=291	+3	8,975
38	(United States) Jay Haas	70-73-75-74=292	+4	8,000
T39	(United States) Keith Clearwater	74-70-75-74=293	+5	6,817
T39	(United States) John Cook	76-67-75-75=293	+5	6,817
T39	(England) Nick Faldo (c)	71-76-79-67=293	+5	6,817
T39	(United States) Lee Janzen	67-73-76-77=293	+5	6,817
T39	(United States) Ted Schulz	69-76-76-72=293	+5	6,817
T39	(United States) Duffy Waldorf	72-75-73-73=293	+5	6,817
T45	(United States) Jay Don Blake	71-74-73-76=294	+6	4,940
T45	(Japan) Masashi Ozaki	75-71-77-71=294	+6	4,940
T45	(Japan) Naomichi Ozaki	74-70-78-72=294	+6	4,940
T45	(Australia) Craig Parry	69-72-75-78=294	+6	4,940
T45	(United States) Tom Watson (c)	71-75-73-75=294	+6	4,940
T50	(United States) Gil Morgan	72-74-72-77=295	+7	4,250
T50	(Australia) Brett Ogle	70-74-71-80=295	+7	4,250
T52	(Scotland) Colin Montgomerie	71-72-78-75=296	+8	4,050
T52	(United States) David Peoples	71-73-78-74=296	+8	4,050
T54	(Australia) Ian Baker-Finch	73-72-73-80=298	+10	3,900
T54	(United States) David Edwards	73-73-76-76=298	+10	3,900
T54	(United States) Davis Love III	73-72-76-77=298	+10	3,900
T57	(United States) Charles Coody (c)	74-72-75-78=299	+11	3,800
T57	(United States) Gary Hallberg	72-74-78-75=299	+11	3,800
59	(United States) John Huston	68-74-84-75=301	+13	3,800
60	(South Africa) Gary Player (c)	71-76-75-80=302	+14	3,700
61	(United States) Billy Andrade	73-74-80-76=303	+15	3,700
CUT	(United States) Paul Azinger	71-77=148	+4	
CUT	(United States) Ben Crenshaw (c)	74-74=148	+4	
CUT	(South Africa) David Frost	75-73=148	+4	
CUT	(United States) Mark Brooks	72-77=149	+5	
CUT	(United States) Mike Hulbert	74-75=149	+5	
CUT	(United States) Justin Leonard (a)	76-73=149	+5	
CUT	(United States) Fred Funk	77-73=150	+6	
CUT	(United States) Bill Glasson	70-80=150	+6	
CUT	(Australia) Wayne Grady	77-73=150	+6	
CUT	(Zimbabwe) Tony Johnstone	74-76=150	+6	
CUT	(United States) Steve Pate	73-77=150	+6	
CUT	(United States) Tommy Aaron (c)	80-71=151	+7	
CUT	(United States) Billy Ray Brown	74-77=151	+7	
CUT	(United States) Tom Kite	73-78=151	+7	
CUT	(United States) Dillard Pruitt	76-75=151	+7	
CUT	(United States) Mark Carnevale	79-73=152	+8	
CUT	(United States) Arnold Palmer (c)	74-78=152	+8	
CUT	(South Africa) Warren Schutte (a)	73-79=152	+8	
CUT	(United States) Jim Gallagher Jr.	81-72=153	+9	
CUT	(Zimbabwe) Nick Price	72-81=153	+9	
CUT	(Canada) Richard Zokol	75-79=154	+10	
CUT	(United States) Danny Yates (a)	76-79=155	+11	
CUT	(United States) Billy Casper (c)	79-77=156	+12	
CUT	(United States) Mark McCumber	76-80=156	+12	
CUT	(United States) Mike Standly	78-79=157	+13	
CUT	(Scotland) Stephen Dundas (a)	78-83=161	+17	
CUT	(United States) Doug Ford (c)	83-78=161	+17	
CUT	(United States) Gay Brewer (c)	80-83=163	+19	
WD	(United States) Curtis Strange	77	+5	

==== Scorecard ====
Hole	1	2	3	4	5	6	7	8	9	10	11	12	13	14	15	16	17	18
Par	4	5	4	3	4	3	4	5	4	4	4	3	5	4	5	3	4	4
(Germany) Langer	−8	−9	−9	−9	−9	−9	−9	−9	−9	−9	−9	−9	−11	−11	−12	−12	−12	−11
(United States) Beck	−5	−6	−7	−6	−6	−6	−7	−7	−7	−7	−7	−7	−8	−8	−8	−7	−7	−7
(United States) Daly	−2	−4	−4	−4	−4	−5	−5	−5	−5	−5	−5	−5	−6	−6	−6	−5	−5	−5
(Australia) Elkington	−4	−5	−4	−4	−4	−4	−4	−4	−5	−4	−3	−3	−3	−3	−5	−5	−6	−5
(United States) Lehman	−2	−3	−4	−4	−5	−5	−5	−6	−6	−6	−6	−6	−6	−6	−6	−5	−5	−5
(United States) Wadkins	−4	−5	−5	−5	−4	−4	−4	−5	−5	−5	−5	−5	−6	−6	−6	−5	−5	−5
(United States) Forsman	−5	−6	−6	−6	−7	−7	−8	−8	−8	−8	−8	−4	−5	−6	−5	−5	−5	−4
(United States) Cochran	−4	−5	−5	−5	−4	−4	−3	−2	−2	−2	−1	E	−1	E	E	E	E	E
(United States) Maggert	−4	−4	−4	−4	−4	−3	−2	−2	−2	−3	−3	−2	−1	E	E	E	−1	E

Cumulative tournament scores, relative to par

Eagle	Birdie	Bogey	Double bogey	Triple bogey +
