= 1991 Masters Tournament =

American golf tournament held in 1991

- Front cover of the 1991 Masters Journal

Tournament information
- Dates: April 11–14, 1991
- Location: Augusta, Georgia; 33.503°N 82.020°W
- Course: Augusta National Golf Club
- Organized by: Augusta National Golf Club
- Tour: PGA Tour

Statistics
- Par: 72
- Length: 6,905 yards (6,314 m)
- Field: 87 players, 57 after cut
- Cut: 146 (+2)
- Prize fund: US$1.35 million
- Winner's share: $243,000

Champion
- (Wales) Ian Woosnam
- 277 (−11)

Location map
- Location in the United States Location in Georgia

The 1991 Masters Tournament was the 55th Masters Tournament held April 11–14 at Augusta National Golf Club in Augusta, Georgia. Ian Woosnam won his only major title, one stroke ahead of runner-up José María Olazábal.

Woosnam, Olazábal, and two-time champion Tom Watson, age 41, were all tied at −11 going into the 72nd hole. Olazábal, a group ahead of the final pairing of Woosnam and Watson, went from fairway bunker to greenside bunker and failed to hole a 45-foot (14 m) par putt. Watson, who had eagled both 13 and 15, missed the fairway right with his tee shot and then hit his second shot into a greenside bunker. He chipped out and three-putted for a double bogey. Woosnam then holed an 8-foot (2.4 m) par putt for the green jacket.

It was the fourth consecutive year that the Masters champion was from the United Kingdom, which had no winners prior to Sandy Lyle's victory in 1988. Through 2026, Woosnam is the only winner at Augusta from Wales. Olazábal later won two Masters, in 1994 and 1999.

Phil Mickelson, a 20-year-old junior at Arizona State, was the low amateur at 290 (+2) and tied for 46th place.

== Course ==
In the fall of 1990, during Tropical Storm Marco, Amen Corner was damaged, especially hole 11 (White Dogwood), which "floated off the golf course" after Rae's Creek overflowed. Also damaged were the Ben Hogan and Byron Nelson Bridges, a retention dam, the scoreboard on the left side of White Dogwood, and a city sewer line. Augusta National rebuilt the greens based on a 1982 survey and photographs, re-paving an abandoned maintenance road to reach the affected area. The repaired holes re-opened to club members in November 1990; the course was fully restored for the 1991 tournament.

== Field ==
1. Masters champions

Tommy Aaron, George Archer, Seve Ballesteros (3,9), Gay Brewer, Billy Casper, Charles Coody, Ben Crenshaw (9,12), Nick Faldo (3,10), Raymond Floyd (2,9), Doug Ford, Bernhard Langer (9), Sandy Lyle, Larry Mize (9,10,13), Jack Nicklaus (9), Arnold Palmer, Gary Player (9), Craig Stadler (9,10), Tom Watson (9,14), Fuzzy Zoeller (9,10)

- Jack Burke Jr., Bob Goalby, Ben Hogan, Herman Keiser, Cary Middlecoff, Byron Nelson, Henry Picard, Gene Sarazen, Sam Snead, and Art Wall Jr. did not play.

2. U.S. Open champions (last five years)

Hale Irwin (12,13), Scott Simpson (9,10), Curtis Strange (9,14)

3. The Open champions (last five years)

Mark Calcavecchia (9,13,14), Greg Norman (10,12,13)

4. PGA champions (last five years)

Wayne Grady (13), Larry Nelson (10), Jeff Sluman (10), Bob Tway (12,13)

- Payne Stewart (11,12,13,14) was injured and did not play

5. U.S. Amateur champion and runner-up

Phil Mickelson (a,12), Manny Zerman (a)

6. The Amateur champion

Rolf Muntz (a)

7. U.S. Amateur Public Links champion

Michael Combs (a)

8. U.S. Mid-Amateur champion

Jim Stuart (a)

9. Top 24 players and ties from the 1990 Masters

Bill Britton (11), Fred Couples (11,13,14), Donnie Hammond, Scott Hoch (10), John Huston (10,13), Steve Jones (10), Tom Kite (12,13,14), José María Olazábal (10,12), Masashi Ozaki, Ronan Rafferty, Lee Trevino, Lanny Wadkins (12,13,14)

10. Top 16 players and ties from the 1990 U.S. Open

Jim Benepe, Mark Brooks, Billy Ray Brown, Mike Donald, John Inman, Tom Sieckmann, Tim Simpson (11,12,13)

11. Top eight players and ties from 1990 PGA Championship

Chip Beck (12,13,14), Billy Mayfair (13), Mark McNulty, Gil Morgan (12,13), Don Pooley, Loren Roberts (13)

12. Winners of PGA Tour events since the previous Masters

Paul Azinger (13,14), Jay Don Blake, Steve Elkington (13), David Frost, Jim Gallagher Jr. (13), Morris Hatalsky, Nolan Henke, Kenny Knox, Wayne Levi (13), Davis Love III (13), Andrew Magee, Rocco Mediate, Jodie Mudd (13), Mark O'Meara (13,14), Steve Pate, Corey Pavin (13), Ted Schulz, Joey Sindelar, Ian Woosnam

- Peter Persons, the winner of the Chattanooga Classic was not invited.

13. Top 30 players from the 1990 PGA Tour money list

John Cook, Ian Baker-Finch, Robert Gamez, Peter Jacobsen, Nick Price, Brian Tennyson

14. Members of the U.S. 1989 Ryder Cup team

Ken Green, Mark McCumber

15. Special foreign invitation

Frankie Miñoza, Tsuneyuki Nakajima

== Round summaries ==
=== First round ===
Thursday, April 11, 1991

Place	Player	Score	To par
T1	(United States) Jim Gallagher Jr.	67	−5
T1	(United States) Mark McCumber	67	−5
T1	(United States) Lanny Wadkins	67	−5
T4	(United States) Fred Couples	68	−4
T4	(United States) Jack Nicklaus	68	−4
T4	(Spain) José María Olazábal	68	−4
T4	(Japan) Masashi Ozaki	68	−4
T4	(United States) Tom Watson	68	−4
T9	(United States) Mark Brooks	69	−3
T9	(United States) Wayne Levi	69	−3
T9	(United States) Phil Mickelson (a)	69	−3
T9	(United States) Scott Simpson	69	−3

=== Second round ===
Friday, April 12, 1991

Place	Player	Score	To par
1	(United States) Tom Watson	68-68=136	−8
T2	(United States) Mark Calcavecchia	70-68=138	−6
T2	(United States) Mark McCumber	67-71=138	−6
T2	(United States) Lanny Wadkins	67-71=138	−6
T2	(Wales) Ian Woosnam	72-66=138	−6
T6	(United States) Billy Ray Brown	74-65=139	−5
T6	(United States) Raymond Floyd	71-68=139	−5
T6	(Germany) Bernhard Langer	71-68=139	−5
T6	(Spain) José María Olazábal	68-71=139	−5
T10	(United States) Hale Irwin	70-70=140	−4
T10	(United States) Jodie Mudd	70-70=140	−4
T10	(United States) Jack Nicklaus	68-72=140	−4
T10	(United States) Fuzzy Zoeller	70-70=140	−4

Amateurs: Mickelson (−2), Zerman (−2), Stuart (+9), Combs (+11), Muntz (+11)

=== Third round ===
Saturday, April 13, 1991

Place	Player	Score	To par
1	(Wales) Ian Woosnam	72-66-67=205	−11
2	(United States) Tom Watson	68-68-70=206	−10
T3	(Spain) José María Olazábal	68-71-69=208	−8
T3	(United States) Lanny Wadkins	67-71-70=208	−8
5	(United States) Larry Mize	72-71-66=209	−7
T6	(Australia) Ian Baker-Finch	71-70-69=210	−6
T6	(United States) Raymond Floyd	71-68-71=210	−6
T6	(United States) Andrew Magee	70-72-68=210	−6
T9	(United States) Ben Crenshaw	70-73-68=211	−5
T9	(United States) Peter Jacobsen	73-70-68=211	−5
T9	(United States) Mark McCumber	67-71-73=211	−5
T9	(United States) Jodie Mudd	70-70-71=211	−5
T9	(United States) Scott Simpson	69-73-69=211	−5

=== Final round ===
Sunday, April 14, 1991

==== Final leaderboard ====
Champion
Silver Cup winner (low amateur)
(a) = amateur
(c) = past champion

Top 10
Place	Player	Score	To par	Money (US$)
1	(Wales) Ian Woosnam	72-66-67-72=277	−11	243,000
2	(Spain) José María Olazábal	68-71-69-70=278	−10	145,800
T3	(United States) Ben Crenshaw (c)	70-73-68-68=279	−9	64,800
T3	(United States) Steve Pate	72-73-69-65=279	−9	64,800
T3	(United States) Lanny Wadkins	67-71-70-71=279	−9	64,800
T3	(United States) Tom Watson (c)	68-68-70-73=279	−9	64,800
T7	(Australia) Ian Baker-Finch	71-70-69-70=280	−8	42,100
T7	(United States) Andrew Magee	70-72-68-70=280	−8	42,100
T7	(United States) Jodie Mudd	70-70-71-69=280	−8	42,100
T10	(United States) Hale Irwin	70-70-75-66=281	−7	35,150
T10	(Japan) Tsuneyuki Nakajima	74-71-67-69=281	−7	35,150

Leaderboard below the top 10
Place	Player	Score	To par	Money ($)
T12	(United States) Mark Calcavecchia	70-68-77-67=282	−6	26,500
T12	(England) Nick Faldo (c)	72-73-67-70=282	−6	26,500
T12	(United States) Billy Mayfair	72-72-72-66=282	−6	26,500
T12	(United States) Craig Stadler (c)	70-72-71-69=282	−6	26,500
T12	(United States) Fuzzy Zoeller (c)	70-70-75-67=282	−6	26,500
T17	(United States) Raymond Floyd (c)	71-68-71-73=283	−5	18,920
T17	(United States) Jim Gallagher Jr.	67-74-71-71=283	−5	18,920
T17	(United States) Peter Jacobsen	73-70-68-72=283	−5	18,920
T17	(United States) Mark McCumber	67-71-73-72=283	−5	18,920
T17	(United States) Larry Mize (c)	72-71-66-74=283	−5	18,920
T22	(Spain) Seve Ballesteros (c)	75-70-69-70=284	−4	12,960
T22	(Australia) Steve Elkington	72-69-74-69=284	−4	12,960
T22	(United States) Rocco Mediate	72-69-71-72=284	−4	12,960
T22	(United States) Corey Pavin	73-70-69-72=284	−4	12,960
T22	(United States) Scott Simpson	69-73-69-73=284	−4	12,960
T27	(United States) Jay Don Blake	74-72-68-71=285	−3	10,200
T27	(United States) Mark O'Meara	74-68-72-71=285	−3	10,200
T29	(United States) Morris Hatalsky	71-72-70-73=286	−2	9,200
T29	(United States) John Huston	73-72-71-70=286	−2	9,200
T29	(United States) Jeff Sluman	71-71-72-72=286	−2	9,200
T32	(South Africa) David Frost	71-73-71-72=287	−1	8,000
T32	(Germany) Bernhard Langer (c)	71-68-74-74=287	−1	8,000
T32	(United States) Wayne Levi	69-73-70-75=287	−1	8,000
T35	(United States) Mark Brooks	69-72-74-73=288	E	6,371
T35	(United States) Fred Couples	68-73-72-75=288	E	6,371
T35	(United States) Ken Green	70-74-71-73=288	E	6,371
T35	(United States) Scott Hoch	72-70-73-73=288	E	6,371
T35	(Zimbabwe) Mark McNulty	72-74-75-67=288	E	6,371
T35	(United States) Jack Nicklaus (c)	68-72-72-76=288	E	6,371
T35	(Japan) Masashi Ozaki	68-77-69-74=288	E	6,371
T42	(United States) Billy Ray Brown	74-65-77-73=289	+1	4,875
T42	(United States) Donnie Hammond	72-73-73-71=289	+1	4,875
T42	(United States) Davis Love III	72-71-74-72=289	+1	4,875
T42	(United States) Curtis Strange	72-74-72-71=289	+1	4,875
T46	(United States) Phil Mickelson (a)	69-73-74-74=290	+2	0
T46	(United States) Don Pooley	72-71-69-78=290	+2	4,050
T46	(United States) Joey Sindelar	72-70-70-78=290	+2	4,050
T49	(United States) Tommy Aaron (c)	70-74-73-74=291	+3	3,533
T49	(Zimbabwe) Nick Price	72-73-72-74=291	+3	3,533
T49	(United States) Lee Trevino	71-72-77-71=291	+3	3,533
52	(United States) Paul Azinger	72-73-67-80=292	+4	3,300
T53	(United States) Nolan Henke	73-71-72-77=293	+5	3,200
T53	(United States) Brian Tennyson	78-67-75-73=293	+5	3,200
55	(United States) Larry Nelson	74-69-76-75=294	+6	3,100
56	(United States) Tom Kite	71-75-78-71=295	+7	3,100
57	(South Africa) Manny Zerman (a)	71-71-77-80=299	+11	0
CUT	(United States) Bill Britton	72-75=147	+3	
CUT	(United States) John Cook	77-70=147	+3	
CUT	(Australia) Greg Norman	78-69=147	+3	
CUT	(South Africa) Gary Player (c)	72-75=147	+3	
CUT	(United States) Billy Casper (c)	77-71=148	+4	
CUT	(United States) Mike Donald	73-75=148	+4	
CUT	(United States) Steve Jones	73-75=148	+4	
CUT	(United States) Tom Sieckmann	72-76=148	+4	
CUT	(United States) Robert Gamez	72-77=149	+5	
CUT	(Northern Ireland) Ronan Rafferty	73-76=149	+5	
CUT	(United States) Loren Roberts	72-77=149	+5	
CUT	(United States) Chip Beck	74-76=150	+6	
CUT	(Australia) Wayne Grady	74-76=150	+6	
CUT	(United States) Bob Tway	75-75=150	+6	
CUT	(United States) Kenny Knox	72-79=151	+7	
CUT	(United States) Tim Simpson	73-78=151	+7	
CUT	(United States) Jim Benepe	78-74=152	+8	
CUT	(United States) Gay Brewer (c)	78-74=152	+8	
CUT	(United States) Ted Schulz	74-78=152	+8	
CUT	(Scotland) Sandy Lyle (c)	77-76=153	+9	
CUT	(Philippines) Frankie Miñoza	78-75=153	+9	
CUT	(United States) Gil Morgan	77-76=153	+9	
CUT	(United States) Jim Stuart (a)	81-72=153	+9	
CUT	(United States) Charles Coody (c)	77-77=154	+10	
CUT	(United States) Michael Combs (a)	81-74=155	+11	
CUT	(United States) John Inman	75-80=155	+11	
CUT	(Netherlands) Rolf Muntz (a)	80-75=155	+11	
CUT	(United States) Arnold Palmer (c)	78-77=155	+11	
WD	(United States) George Archer (c)	73	+1	
WD	(United States) Doug Ford (c)			

==== Scorecard ====
Hole	1	2	3	4	5	6	7	8	9	10	11	12	13	14	15	16	17	18
Par	4	5	4	3	4	3	4	5	4	4	4	3	5	4	5	3	4	4
(Wales) Woosnam	−11	−12	−12	−11	−12	−11	−11	−11	−12	−11	−11	−11	−10	−10	−11	−11	−11	−11
(Spain) Olazábal	−9	−9	−9	−9	−10	−10	−11	−10	−9	−8	8	−8	−9	−10	−11	−11	−11	−10
(United States) Crenshaw	−5	−6	−6	−5	−5	−5	−6	−7	−7	−7	−7	−7	−7	−7	−9	−9	−9	−9
(United States) Pate	−2	−3	−3	−4	−4	−4	−4	−6	−6	−6	−6	−6	−7	−7	−8	−8	−9	−9
(United States) Wadkins	−8	−9	−9	−9	−7	−7	−8	−9	−9	−9	−9	−9	−9	−9	−9	−9	−8	−9
(United States) Watson	−9	−10	−10	−10	−9	−9	−9	−9	−9	−10	−9	−7	−9	−9	−11	−11	−11	−9

Cumulative tournament scores, relative to par

Eagle	Birdie	Bogey	Double bogey
