= Vertical Groove Golf =

Golf company

- Company type: Private
- Industry: Manufacturing
- Founded: 2014
- Founder: Rubin Hanan; Neal Jagoda
- Headquarters: Florida
- Products: Golf clubs

Vertical Groove Golf (VGG) manufactures a driver and other golf clubs, with a unique design: the groove lines along the face of the club are vertical rather than horizontal. The company was founded in 2014 by Rubin Hanan and Neal Jagoda using technology developed by Tony Antonious prior to his death in 2007. Antonious held over 400 golf related patents at the time of his death, including the Velcro golf glove. The company officially launched on January 9, 2017

Hanan and Jagoda licensed the vertical groove technology from the estate in 2014 and began the testing phase utilizing Golf Labs in San Diego. The club tested well, showing improved distance and accuracy over similar clubs in a controlled environment. Based on test results, GRT Capital, led by Tom Krochuk and Jeff Barry became partners and supplied capital to bring the club to market, specifically a driver.

VGG is currently a provider for the PGA Champions Tour.

Notable golfers who have used Vertical Groove clubs include John Daly, Rocco Mediate and Kenny Perry.
