= John Inman (golfer) =

American professional golfer (born 1962)

Personal information
- Full name: John Samuel Inman
- Nationality: United States
- Born: November 26, 1962 (age 63) Greensboro, North Carolina, U.S.
- Height: 5 ft 10 in (1.78 m)
- Weight: 155 lb (70 kg; 11.1 st)
- Spouse: Patti Arnold

Career
- Sport: Golf
- College: University of North Carolina
- Turned professional: 1985
- Current tour: Champions Tour
- Former tours: PGA Tour; Nationwide Tour
- Professional wins: 2

Number of wins by tour
- PGA Tour: 2

Best results in major championships
- Masters Tournament: 59th: 1985
- PGA Championship: T58: 1988
- U.S. Open: T14: 1990
- The Open Championship: DNP

Achievements and awards
- Haskins Award: 1984

John Samuel Inman (born November 26, 1962) is an American professional golfer and college men's golf head coach. He is the younger brother of professional golfer Joe Inman.

== Early life ==
Inman was born in Greensboro, North Carolina, where he graduated from Grimsley High School. His senior year in 1980, he won the NCHSAA men's golf state championship.

== Amateur career ==
Inman attended the University of North Carolina at Chapel Hill from 1980–1984 and was a distinguished member of the golf team – a three-time All-American. In his senior year, Inman received the Haskins Award given annually to the college player of the year. He was the individual champion at the 1984 NCAA Division I Championship. His 17 under par performance in that tournament broke the record set 13 years earlier by Ben Crenshaw and stood until 2000, when it was bettered by the 23-under-par performance of Oklahoma State's Charles Howell III.

== Professional career ==
Inman turned professional in 1985 and played full-time on the PGA Tour from 1987 to 1996 and won two events. His first win came in the 1987 Provident Classic by one stroke over Bill Glasson and Rocco Mediate. Inman's second win came during a 5-man playoff at the 1993 Buick Southern Open. His best finish in a major championship was T-14 at the 1990 U.S. Open.

After his tour playing days were over, Inman returned to his alma mater in July 1998 to take over the reins of the men's golf program. He has prioritized making emerging technology and applications available to his players.

In 2011, Inman decided to return to professional golf and play in the Nationwide Tour's Rex Hospital Open. The two-time PGA Tour winner will play on the Nationwide Tour until he is eligible to compete in the Champions Tour.

== Amateur wins ==
- 1982 Eastern Amateur
- 1984 NCAA Division I Championship, Western Amateur
- 1985 Azalea Invitational

== Professional wins (2) ==
=== PGA Tour wins (2) ===
No.	Date	Tournament	Margin of victory	Runners-up
1	Aug 30, 1987	Provident Classic	1 stroke	(United States) Bill Glasson, (United States) Rocco Mediate
2	Oct 1, 1993	Buick Southern Open	Playoff	(United States) Billy Andrade, (United States) Mark Brooks, (United States) Brad Bryant, (United States) Bob Estes

PGA Tour playoff record (1–0)

No.	Year	Tournament	Opponents	Result
1	1993	Buick Southern Open	(United States) Billy Andrade, (United States) Mark Brooks, (United States) Brad Bryant, (United States) Bob Estes	Won with birdie on second extra hole Andrade, Brooks and Bryant eliminated by birdie on first hole

== Results in major championships ==
Tournament	1985	1986	1987	1988	1989	1990	1991	1992	1993	1994
Masters Tournament	59						CUT			CUT
U.S. Open	CUT					T14	T53			
PGA Championship				T58						T66

Note: Inman never played in The Open Championship.

Did not play

CUT = missed the half-way cut
"T" = tied

== U.S. national team appearances ==
Amateur

- Eisenhower Trophy: 1984

== See also ==
- 1986 PGA Tour Qualifying School graduates
- 1990 PGA Tour Qualifying School graduates
- 1991 PGA Tour Qualifying School graduates
