= 1988 PGA Tour Qualifying School graduates =

This is a list of the 1988 PGA Tour Qualifying School graduates. 52 players earned their 1989 PGA Tour card through Q-School in 1988. The tournament was played over 108 holes at the PGA West (Nicklaus Resort course) and La Quinta Hotel Golf Club (Dunes course), in La Quinta, California. Those earning cards split the $100,000 purse, with the winner earning $15,000.

Place	Player	Notes
1	(United States) Robin Freeman	
2	(United States) Brad Bryant	
3	(United States) Don Reese	
T4	(United States) John Adams	Runner-up at 1982 Hall of Fame PGA Tour event
T4	(United States) Billy Andrade	
T4	(United States) Robert Thompson	
T7	(United States) Webb Heintezlman	
T7	(United States) David Tentis	
T9	(United States) Ray Barr Jr.	
T9	(United States) Nolan Henke	Winner of 1986 Porter Cup
T9	(Canada) Jack Kay Jr.	Winner of 1986 Eisenhower Trophy
T9	(United States) Billy Pierot	
T9	(United States) Tony Sills	
T14	(United States) Ed Humenik	
T14	(Spain) Miguel Ángel Martín	
16	(United States) Karl Kimball	
T17	(United States) Mark Hayes	3 PGA Tour wins
T17	(United States) P. H. Horgan III	
T17	(United States) Ronnie McCann	
T17	(United States) Larry Silveira	
T21	(United States) Bill Buttner	
T21	(United States) Rex Caldwell	1 PGA Tour win
T21	(United States) Billy Mayfair	Winner of 1987 U.S. Amateur
T21	(United States) Mike Miles	
T21	(United States) Ted Schulz	
T21	(United States) Don Shirey Jr.	
T27	(United States) Roy Biancalana	
T27	(Namibia) Trevor Dodds	
T27	(United States) Duffy Waldorf	
T27	(United States) Bob Wolcott	
T31	(United States) Bob Estes	
T31	(Canada) Tony Grimes	
T31	(United States) David Jackson	
T31	(United States) Gregory Ladehoff	
T31	(United States) J. L. Lewis	
T36	(United States) Jim Booros	
T36	(United States) Clark Burroughs	
T36	(United States) Jay Delsing	
T36	(United States) Fred Funk	Winner of 1984 PGA Assistant Championship
T36	(United States) Jeff Hart	
T36	(United States) Steve Hart	
T36	(United States) Kent Kluba	
T36	(United States) John McComish	
T36	(United States) Rick Pearson	
T36	(United States) Lance Ten Broeck	Winner of 1984 Magnolia State Classic
T46	(United States) Charlie Bowling	
T46	(United States) Rick Dalpos	
T46	(United States) Joel Edwards	
T46	(Canada) Ray Stewart	
T46	(United States) Billy Tuten	
T46	(United States) Greg Twiggs	
T46	(United States) Doug Weaver	
