= 1991 PGA Tour =

Golf tour season

1991 PGA Tour season
- Duration: January 3, 1991 – November 3, 1991
- Number of official events: 44
- Most wins: (United States) Billy Andrade (2) (Note: Ian Woosnam also won two events, but was not a PGA Tour member.) (United States) Mark Brooks (2) (United States) Fred Couples (2) (United States) Andrew Magee (2) (United States) Corey Pavin (2) (Zimbabwe) Nick Price (2) (United States) Tom Purtzer (2)
- Money list: (United States) Corey Pavin
- PGA Tour Player of the Year: (United States) Fred Couples
- PGA Player of the Year: (United States) Corey Pavin
- Rookie of the Year: (United States) John Daly

The 1991 PGA Tour was the 76th season of the PGA Tour, the main professional golf tour in the United States. It was also the 23rd season since separating from the PGA of America.

== Schedule ==
The following table lists official events during the 1991 season.

Date	Tournament	Location	Purse (US$)	Winner (Note: The number in parentheses after each winner's name is the number of PGA Tour events they had won up to and including that tournament. This information is only shown for PGA Tour members.)	OWGR points	Notes
Jan 6	Infiniti Tournament of Champions	California	800,000	(United States) Tom Kite (15)	52	Winners-only event
Jan 13	Northern Telecom Open	Arizona	1,000,000	(United States) Phil Mickelson (a) (1)	42	
Jan 20	United Hawaiian Open	Hawaii	1,100,000	(United States) Lanny Wadkins (20)	48	
Jan 27	Phoenix Open	Arizona	1,000,000	(United States) Nolan Henke (2)	44	
Feb 3	AT&T Pebble Beach National Pro-Am	California	1,100,000	(United States) Paul Azinger (7)	52	Pro-Am
Feb 10	Bob Hope Chrysler Classic	California	1,100,000	(United States) Corey Pavin (8)	50	Pro-Am
Feb 17	Shearson Lehman Brothers Open	California	1,000,000	(United States) Jay Don Blake (1)	36	
Feb 24	Nissan Los Angeles Open	California	1,000,000	(United States) Ted Schulz (2)	50	
Mar 4	Doral-Ryder Open	Florida	1,400,000	(United States) Rocco Mediate (1)	58	
Mar 10	Honda Classic	Florida	1,000,000	(United States) Steve Pate (4)	48	
Mar 17	Nestle Invitational	Florida	1,000,000	(United States) Andrew Magee (2)	52	Invitational
Mar 24	USF&G Classic	Louisiana	1,000,000	(Wales) Ian Woosnam (n/a)	40	
Mar 31	The Players Championship	Florida	1,600,000	(Australia) Steve Elkington (2)	80	Flagship event
Apr 14	Masters Tournament	Georgia	1,350,000	(Wales) Ian Woosnam (n/a)	100	Major championship
Apr 14	Deposit Guaranty Golf Classic	Mississippi	300,000	(United States) Larry Silveira (n/a)	16	Alternate event (Note: Official money; unofficial win.)
Apr 21	MCI Heritage Golf Classic	South Carolina	1,000,000	(United States) Davis Love III (3)	52	Invitational
Apr 28	KMart Greater Greensboro Open	North Carolina	1,250,000	(United States) Mark Brooks (2)	42	
May 5	GTE Byron Nelson Golf Classic	Texas	1,100,000	(Zimbabwe) Nick Price (2)	42	
May 12	BellSouth Atlanta Golf Classic	Georgia	1,000,000	(United States) Corey Pavin (9)	42	
May 19	Memorial Tournament	Ohio	1,200,000	(United States) Kenny Perry (1)	58	Invitational
May 26	Southwestern Bell Colonial	Texas	1,200,000	(United States) Tom Purtzer (4)	52	Invitational
Jun 2	Kemper Open	Maryland	1,000,000	(United States) Billy Andrade (1)	44	
Jun 9	Buick Classic	New York	1,000,000	(United States) Billy Andrade (2)	64	
Jun 17	U.S. Open	Minnesota	1,300,000	(United States) Payne Stewart (8)	100	Major championship
Jun 23	Anheuser-Busch Golf Classic	Virginia	1,000,000	(United States) Mike Hulbert (3)	38	
Jun 30	Federal Express St. Jude Classic	Tennessee	1,000,000	(United States) Fred Couples (5)	38	
Jul 7	Centel Western Open	Illinois	1,000,000	(United States) Russ Cochran (1)	48	
Jul 14	New England Classic	Massachusetts	1,000,000	(United States) Bruce Fleisher (1)	18	
Jul 21	The Open Championship	England	£900,000	(Australia) Ian Baker-Finch (2)	100	Major championship (Note: Unofficial money event at the time, but retrospectively counted as an official win.)
Jul 21	Chattanooga Classic	Tennessee	700,000	(United States) Dillard Pruitt (1)	16	Alternate event
Jul 28	Canon Greater Hartford Open	Connecticut	1,000,000	(United States) Billy Ray Brown (1)	30	
Aug 4	Buick Open	Michigan	1,000,000	(United States) Brad Faxon (1)	52	
Aug 11	PGA Championship	Indiana	1,350,000	(United States) John Daly (1)	100	Major championship
Aug 18	The International	Colorado	1,100,000	(Spain) José María Olazábal (2)	46	
Aug 25	NEC World Series of Golf	Ohio	1,200,000	(United States) Tom Purtzer (5)	52	Limited-field event
Sep 1	Greater Milwaukee Open	Wisconsin	1,000,000	(United States) Mark Brooks (3)	44	
Sep 8	Canadian Open	Canada	1,000,000	(Zimbabwe) Nick Price (3)	48	
Sep 15	Hardee's Golf Classic	Illinois	1,000,000	(United States) D. A. Weibring (3)	40	
Sep 22	B.C. Open	New York	800,000	(United States) Fred Couples (6)	30	
Sep 29	Buick Southern Open	Georgia	700,000	(United States) David Peoples (1)	24	
Oct 6	H.E.B. Texas Open	Texas	900,000	(United States) Blaine McCallister (4)	42	
Oct 13	Las Vegas Invitational	Nevada	1,500,000	(United States) Andrew Magee (3)	40	
Oct 19	Walt Disney World/Oldsmobile Classic	Florida	1,000,000	(United States) Mark O'Meara (7)	46	
Oct 26; ~~Apr 7~~	Independent Insurance Agent Open	Texas	800,000	(South Africa) Fulton Allem (1)	42	
Nov 3	The Tour Championship	North Carolina	2,000,000	(United States) Craig Stadler (9)	46	Tour Championship

=== Unofficial events ===
The following events were sanctioned by the PGA Tour, but did not carry official money, nor were wins official.

Date	Tournament	Location	Purse ($)	Winner(s)	OWGR points	Notes
Sep 19	Ryder Cup	South Carolina	n/a	Team USA	n/a	Team event
Nov 3	World Cup	Italy	1,100,000	(Sweden) Anders Forsbrand and (Sweden) Per-Ulrik Johansson	n/a	Team event
Nov 3	World Cup Individual Trophy	Italy	1,100,000	(Wales) Ian Woosnam	n/a	
Nov 10	Amoco-Centel Championship	South Carolina	760,000	(United States) Jim Thorpe	n/a	
Nov 13	PGA Grand Slam of Golf	Hawaii	1,000,000	(Wales) Ian Woosnam	n/a	Limited-field event
Nov 16	Isuzu Kapalua International	Hawaii	750,000	(United States) Mike Hulbert	40	
Nov 24	Shark Shootout	California	1,000,000	(United States) Tom Purtzer and (United States) Lanny Wadkins	n/a	Team event
Dec 1	Skins Game	California	540,000	(United States) Payne Stewart	n/a	Limited-field event
Dec 6	JCPenney Classic	Florida	1,100,000	(United States) Billy Andrade and (United States) Kris Tschetter	n/a	Team event

== Money list ==
The money list was based on prize money won during the season, calculated in U.S. dollars.

Position	Player	Prize money ($)
1	(United States) Corey Pavin	979,430
2	(United States) Craig Stadler	827,628
3	(United States) Fred Couples	791,749
4	(United States) Tom Purtzer	750,568
5	(United States) Andrew Magee	750,082
6	(United States) Steve Pate	727,997
7	(Zimbabwe) Nick Price	714,389
8	(United States) Davis Love III	686,361
9	(United States) Paul Azinger	685,603
10	(United States) Russ Cochran	684,851

== Awards ==
Award	Winner	Ref.
PGA Tour Player of the Year (Jack Nicklaus Trophy)	(United States) Fred Couples	
PGA Player of the Year	(United States) Corey Pavin	
Rookie of the Year	(United States) John Daly	
Scoring leader (PGA Tour – Byron Nelson Award)	(United States) Fred Couples	
Scoring leader (PGA – Vardon Trophy)	(United States) Fred Couples	
Comeback Player of the Year (Note: Fleisher and Weibring shared the Comeback Player of the Year award.)	(United States) Bruce Fleisher (United States) D. A. Weibring	

== See also ==
- 1991 Ben Hogan Tour
- 1991 Senior PGA Tour
