= Constellation Furyk and Friends =

Golf tournament on the PGA Tour Champions

Tournament information
- Location: Jacksonville, Florida
- Established: 2021
- Course: Timuquana Country Club
- Par: 72
- Length: 7,005 yards (6,405 m)
- Tour: PGA Tour Champions
- Format: Stroke play
- Prize fund: US$2,100,000
- Month played: October

Tournament record score
- Aggregate: 199 Alex Čejka (2026); 199 Vaughn Taylor (2026)
- To par: −17 as above

Current champion
- (United States) Vaughn Taylor

Location map
- Location in the United States Location in Florida

The Constellation Furyk and Friends is a golf tournament on the PGA Tour Champions. It is played annually in the autumn in Jacksonville, Florida at the Timuquana Country Club. Jim Furyk is the tournament host. The tournament was founded in 2021.

== Winners ==
Year	Winner	Score	To par	Margin of victory	Runner-up
2026	(United States) Vaughn Taylor	199	−17	Playoff	(Germany) Alex Čejka
2025	(United States) Tommy Gainey	202	−14	2 strokes	(Australia) Cameron Percy
2024	(United States) Rocco Mediate	204	−12	Playoff	(United States) Bob Estes
2023	(United States) Brett Quigley	205	−11	1 stroke	(New Zealand) Steven Alker
2022	(United States) Steve Stricker	202	−14	2 strokes	(United States) Harrison Frazar
2021	(United States) Phil Mickelson	201	−15	2 strokes	(Spain) Miguel Ángel Jiménez
