= Bob Estes =

American professional golfer

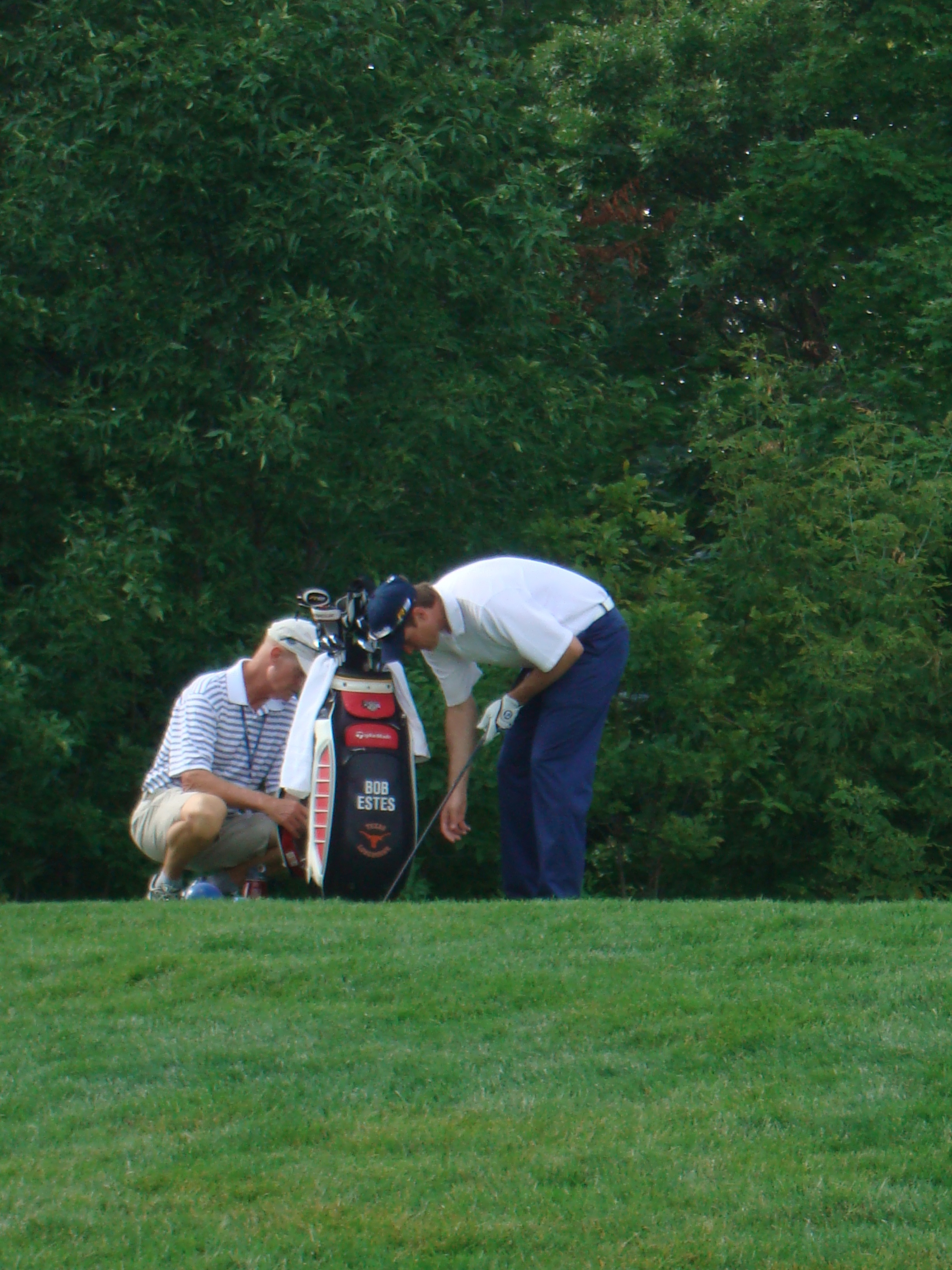
- Estes in 2009

Personal information
- Full name: Bob Alan Estes
- Nationality: United States
- Born: February 2, 1966 (age 60) Graham, Texas, U.S.
- Height: 6 ft 2 in (1.88 m)
- Weight: 180 lb (82 kg; 13 st)

Career
- Sport: Golf
- College: University of Texas
- Turned professional: 1988
- Current tour: PGA Tour Champions
- Former tour: PGA Tour
- Professional wins: 4
- Highest ranking: 13 (August 11, 2002)

Number of wins by tour
- PGA Tour: 4

Best results in major championships
- Masters Tournament: T4: 1999
- PGA Championship: T6: 1993, 1995, 1999
- U.S. Open: T11: 2005
- The Open Championship: T8: 1995

Achievements and awards
- Haskins Award: 1988
- Jack Nicklaus Award: 1988
- PGA Tour Rookie of the Year: 1989

Bob Alan Estes (born February 2, 1966) is an American professional golfer who plays on the PGA Tour Champions. He was previously a member of the PGA Tour, where he was a four-time champion.

== Early life and amateur career ==
Estes was born in Graham, Texas and raised in Abilene, Texas. He first played golf at age 4 and decided to become a professional golfer at age 12. Estes attended the University of Texas from 1984 to 1988 and was a member of the golf team. He won the 1988 Haskins Award for most outstanding collegiate golfer in the nation.

== Professional career ==
Estes had four PGA Tour victories between 1994 and 2002, and he has been in the top 20 of the Official World Golf Ranking. He is particularly well known for his excellent short game. Estes follows a strict physical conditioning routine that includes weightlifting, agility exercises, diet and short-distance wind sprints. In addition, he has experimented with the 10-finger grip, which is rare in the modern game of golf.

In 2011, Estes was recovering from a wrist injury, but still managed to make 12 starts on the PGA Tour. Of the five cuts he made, one was a near-win at the Greenbrier Classic, where he lost in a playoff. Estes is 0–4 in PGA Tour playoffs. He still managed to finish 135th on the Tour's money list, but regained his Tour card through Q School and satisfied a medical extension.

After making the FedEx Cup in 2012, Estes only made two starts in 2013, missing the cut in Las Vegas and finishing T10 at Mayakoba. Estes had a medical exemption until July 2018. In 2016, he changed his focus to PGA Tour Champions.

== Amateur wins ==
- 1985 Trans-Mississippi Amateur
- 1987 LaJet Amateur
- 1988 Texas State Amateur

== Professional wins (4) ==
=== PGA Tour wins (4) ===
No.	Date	Tournament	Winning score	Margin of victory	Runner(s)-up
1	Oct 16, 1994	Texas Open	−19 (62-65-68-70=265)	1 stroke	(United States) Gil Morgan
2	Jun 10, 2001	FedEx St. Jude Classic	−17 (61-66-69-71=267)	1 stroke	(Germany) Bernhard Langer
3	Oct 14, 2001	Invensys Classic at Las Vegas	−30 (65-66-67-68-63=329)	1 stroke	(United States) Tom Lehman, (South Africa) Rory Sabbatini
4	Jun 2, 2002	Kemper Insurance Open	−11 (65-69-69-70=273)	1 stroke	(United States) Rich Beem

PGA Tour playoff record (0–4)

No.	Year	Tournament	Opponent(s)	Result
1	1989	B.C. Open	(United States) Mike Hulbert	Lost to par on first extra hole
2	1993	Buick Southern Open	(United States) Billy Andrade, (United States) Mark Brooks, (United States) Brad Bryant, (United States) John Inman	Inman won with birdie on second extra hole Andrade, Brooks and Bryant eliminated by birdie on first hole
3	2003	HP Classic of New Orleans	(United States) Steve Flesch	Lost to birdie on first extra hole
4	2011	Greenbrier Classic	(United States) Bill Haas, (United States) Scott Stallings	Stallings won with birdie on first extra hole

== Playoff record ==
PGA Tour Champions playoff record (0–1)

No.	Year	Tournament	Opponent	Result
1	2024	Constellation Furyk and Friends	(United States) Rocco Mediate	Lost to par on second extra hole

== Results in major championships ==
Tournament	1990	1991	1992	1993	1994	1995	1996	1997	1998	1999
Masters Tournament					CUT	T29	T27			T4
U.S. Open		CUT	T44	T52		CUT				T30
The Open Championship	CUT				T24	T8	CUT		T24	T49
PGA Championship	CUT		T76	T6	T47	T6	CUT		T34	T6

Tournament	2000	2001	2002	2003	2004	2005	2006	2007	2008	2009
Masters Tournament	T19		45	22	T31					
U.S. Open	CUT	T30	CUT	CUT	CUT	T11	CUT	T58		
The Open Championship	T20	T25	T18	T34	T20					
PGA Championship	CUT	T37	CUT	T57	CUT	T28	CUT			T76

Tournament	2010	2011	2012
Masters Tournament			
U.S. Open	CUT		T46
The Open Championship		CUT	T45
PGA Championship			

Top 10
Did not play

CUT = missed the half-way cut
"T" = tied

=== Summary ===
Tournament	Wins	2nd	3rd	Top-5	Top-10	Top-25	Events	Cuts made
Masters Tournament	0	0	0	1	1	3	8	7
U.S. Open	0	0	0	0	0	1	15	7
The Open Championship	0	0	0	0	1	7	13	10
PGA Championship	0	0	0	0	3	3	16	10
Totals	0	0	0	1	5	14	52	34

- Most consecutive cuts made – 7 (1998 Open Championship – 2000 Masters)
- Longest streak of top-10s – 2 (1995 Open Championship – 1995 PGA)

== Results in The Players Championship ==
Tournament	1990	1991	1992	1993	1994	1995	1996	1997	1998	1999
The Players Championship	T70	CUT	T70	T20	T35	T34	CUT		T42	T62

Tournament	2000	2001	2002	2003	2004	2005	2006	2007	2008	2009
The Players Championship	CUT	CUT	T44	31	CUT	T17	CUT	CUT	CUT	T76

Tournament	2010	2011	2012
The Players Championship	T26		T15

Did not play

CUT = missed the halfway cut
"T" indicates a tie for a place

== Results in World Golf Championships ==
Tournament	1999	2000	2001	2002	2003	2004
Match Play	R64	R16	R64	QF	R64	R32
Championship	T11		NT^{1}	T9	T25	
Invitational				T19	T46	

^{1}Cancelled due to 9/11

Top 10
Did not play

QF, R16, R32, R64 = Round in which player lost in match play
"T" = Tied
NT = No tournament

== Results in senior major championships ==
Results not in chronological order

Tournament	2017	2018	2019	2020	2021	2022	2023	2024	2025	2026
Senior PGA Championship	T5	T10		NT	CUT	T20	T45	T65	CUT	
The Tradition		T8		NT	T15		T18	T30	T52	T65
U.S. Senior Open	T23	T31	4	NT	T8	T28	T18	T5	T45	
Senior Players Championship		T50	T24	T59	T49	T38	T51	T26	T40	T71
The Senior Open Championship		T43	T10	NT			CUT	T21	T40	CUT

Top 10
Did not play

CUT = missed the halfway cut
"T" indicates a tie for a place
NT = no tournament due to COVID-19 pandemic

== See also ==
- 1988 PGA Tour Qualifying School graduates
- 2011 PGA Tour Qualifying School graduates
