= Mitch Voges =

American golfer (born 1949)

Mitch Voges (born November 28, 1949) is an American amateur golfer.

Voges played college golf at Brigham Young University and United States International University.

Voges won the 1991 U.S. Amateur. At the time of his victory, he was the third oldest winner of the event. He also competed at the 1991 Walker Cup match.

Voges also had a patent dispute over golf club fitting.

== U.S. national team appearances ==
Amateur

- Walker Cup: 1991 (winners)
