= Brad Faxon =

American professional golfer (born 1961)

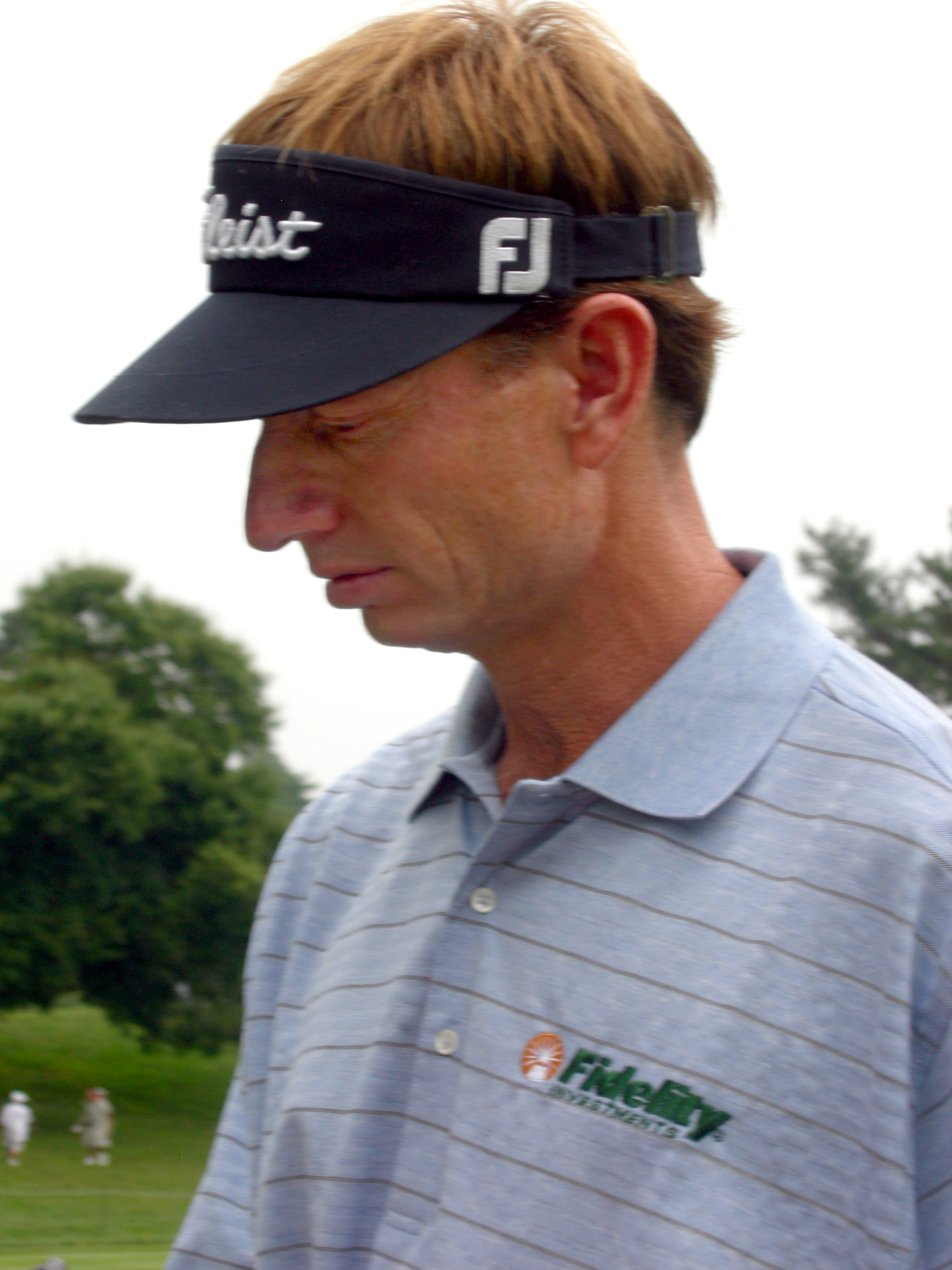

Personal information
- Full name: Bradford John Faxon Jr.
- Nationality: United States
- Born: August 1, 1961 (age 65) Oceanport, New Jersey, U.S.
- Height: 6 ft 1 in (1.85 m)
- Weight: 180 lb (82 kg; 13 st)

Career
- Sport: Golf
- College: Furman University
- Turned professional: 1983
- Current tour: PGA Tour Champions
- Former tour: PGA Tour
- Professional wins: 21
- Highest ranking: 11 (May 25, 1997)

Number of wins by tour
- PGA Tour: 8
- PGA Tour of Australasia: 1
- PGA Tour Champions: 2
- Other: 10

Best results in major championships
- Masters Tournament: T9: 1993
- PGA Championship: 5th: 1995
- U.S. Open: T33: 1989, 1994
- The Open Championship: 7th: 1994

Achievements and awards
- Haskins Award: 1983
- Payne Stewart Award: 2005

Bradford John Faxon Jr. (born August 1, 1961) is an American professional golfer. He has won eight times on the PGA Tour.

== Early life and amateur career ==
Faxon was born in Oceanport, New Jersey and raised in Barrington, Rhode Island. He attended Furman University, and earned a Bachelor of Economics degree in 1983.

At Furman, Faxon was a two-time All-American (1982, 1983) as a member of the golf team. He played on the 1983 Walker Cup team. Faxon won the Haskins Award for the most outstanding collegiate golfer in the United States in 1983. He also received that same year's Golf Magazine and NCAA Coaches Awards as the nation's outstanding amateur golfer. He turned professional in 1983.

== Professional career ==
=== PGA Tour ===
Faxon has won eight times on the PGA Tour and played on two Ryder Cup teams. While admittedly not a great driver of the golf ball or a great ball-striker, Faxon has built a reputation as one of the best pure putters in golf history. He led the PGA Tour in Putting Average in 1996, 1999, and 2000 (when he set the single-season record with only 1.704 putts/greens in regulation), and finished 13th in 2005 at the age of 44. Faxon explains his success on the greens thus: "My only secret is confidence... I just try to hit every putt as if I've just made a million in a row."

Faxon had been one of the most successful players on the PGA Tour throughout the 1990s, a mainstay in the top 20 of the Official World Golf Rankings, but a knee injury began to hamper his effectiveness in 2003, causing him to suffer through his worst season in 14 years in 2004. Faxon bounced back in 2005, though, winning his first tournament in four years and finishing 45th on the PGA Tour Money List. On September 19, 2005, he underwent surgery to repair torn ligaments in his right knee. Faxon returned to competition for the 2006 season, in which he earned over $500,000.

In addition to his success on the PGA Tour Faxon played quite well on the Australasian Tour. He won the 1993 Australian Open, finished second in the 1993 Air New Zealand Shell Open, and finished in third place at the 1995 Greg Norman Holden International.

=== Champions Tour ===
Faxon made his Champions Tour debut at the 2011 3M Championship, where he finished T-31. He won his first title in October at the Insperity Championship.

== Other projects ==
=== Charitable work ===
In addition to being one of the PGA Tour's top players over the past 25 years, Faxon is one of the game's most generous figures. In 1991, Faxon along with fellow Tour pro Billy Andrade, formed Billy Andrade/Brad Faxon Charities for Children, Inc., a non-profit organization that (as of 2005) has donated over $3 million to needy children in Rhode Island and southern Massachusetts. For their charity work, Faxon and Andrade were awarded the 1999 Golf Writers Association of America's Charlie Bartlett Award, given to professional golfers for unselfish contributions to society. Since 1999, Andrade and Faxon have also served as hosts of the CVS Charity Classic, a golf tournament held at the Rhode Island Country Club each June, whose proceeds benefit the two players' charity. He also co-chair's Button Hole with Andrade, a short course that serves as a teaching and learning center for children. Faxon also runs his own junior golf foundation.

=== Broadcasting ===
In 2010, Faxon worked for NBC as an analyst on golf broadcasts during the season. It was announced in July 2014 that Faxon would be joining Fox in 2015 as an on-air commentator along with David Fay.

=== Fight for Furman golf ===
In 2014, Furman University announced the school was going to discontinue the golf program. Faxon helped lead an alumni drive to save the program.

== Personal life ==
Faxon resides in Palm Beach Gardens with his wife, Dory, and their four daughters.

== Amateur wins ==
- 1975 Rhode Island Junior
- 1979 Rhode Island Amateur
- 1980 New England Amateur,
- 1981 New England Amateur, Rhode Island Amateur
- 1982 Sunnehanna Amateur

== Professional wins (21) ==
=== PGA Tour wins (8) ===
| No. | Date | Tournament | Winning score | Margin of victory | Runner(s)-up |
|---|---|---|---|---|---|
| 1 | Aug 4, 1991 | Buick Open | −17 (66-68-71-66=271) | Playoff | (United States) Chip Beck |
| 2 | Jul 26, 1992 | New England Classic | −16 (66-67-67-68=268) | 2 strokes | (United States) Phil Mickelson |
| 3 | Aug 23, 1992 | The International | 14 pts (4-7-7-14=14) | 2 points | (United States) Lee Janzen |
| 4 | Apr 6, 1997 | Freeport-McDermott Classic | −16 (68-69-66-69=272) | 3 strokes | (United States) Bill Glasson, (Sweden) Jesper Parnevik |
| 5 | Sep 20, 1999 | B.C. Open | −15 (69-67-70-67=273) | Playoff | (United States) Fred Funk |
| 6 | Jul 23, 2000 | B.C. Open (2) | −18 (68-66-68-68=270) | 1 stroke | (Mexico) Esteban Toledo |
| 7 | Jan 21, 2001 | Sony Open in Hawaii | −20 (64-64-67-65=260) | 4 strokes | (United States) Tom Lehman |
| 8 | Aug 28, 2005 | Buick Championship | −14 (69-71-65-61=266) | Playoff | (South Africa) Tjaart van der Walt |

PGA Tour playoff record (3–6)

| No. | Year | Tournament | Opponent(s) | Result |
|---|---|---|---|---|
| 1 | 1991 | Buick Open | (United States) Chip Beck | Won with par on first extra hole |
| 2 | 1992 | Infiniti Tournament of Champions | (Australia) Steve Elkington | Lost to birdie on first extra hole |
| 3 | 1992 | Buick Open | (Australia) Steve Elkington, (United States) Dan Forsman | Forsman won with par on second extra hole Faxon eliminated by par on first hole |
| 4 | 1996 | United Airlines Hawaiian Open | (United States) Jim Furyk | Lost to birdie on third extra hole |
| 5 | 1996 | Sprint International | (United States) Clarence Rose | Lost to eagle on third extra hole |
| 6 | 1997 | Greater Greensboro Chrysler Classic | (New Zealand) Frank Nobilo | Lost to par on first extra hole |
| 7 | 1999 | B.C. Open | (United States) Fred Funk | Won with par on second extra hole |
| 8 | 2003 | Bell Canadian Open | (United States) Bob Tway | Lost to bogey on third extra hole |
| 9 | 2005 | Buick Championship | (South Africa) Tjaart van der Walt | Won with birdie on first extra hole |

=== PGA Tour of Australasia wins (1) ===
Legend
Flagship events (1)
Other PGA Tour of Australasia (0)

| No. | Date | Tournament | Winning score | Margin of victory | Runners-up |
|---|---|---|---|---|---|
| 1 | Nov 28, 1993 | Heineken Australian Open | −13 (65-74-66-70=275) | 2 strokes | (Australia) Mike Clayton, (Australia) Jeff Woodland |

=== PGA Tour satellite wins (1) ===
| No. | Date | Tournament | Winning score | Margin of victory | Runner-up |
|---|---|---|---|---|---|
| 1 | Jun 15, 1986 | Provident Classic | −19 (67-62-69-63=261) | 1 stroke | (United States) Scott Hoch |

=== Other wins (9) ===
| No. | Date | Tournament | Winning score | Margin of victory | Runner(s)-up |
|---|---|---|---|---|---|
| 1 | Jul 31, 1985 | Rhode Island Open | −6 (68-72-67=207) | 2 strokes | (United States) Jeff Lewis |
| 2 | Nov 20, 1994 | Franklin Funds Shark Shootout (with (United States) Fred Couples) | −26 (68-64-58=190) | 2 strokes | (United States) Mark O'Meara and (United States) Curtis Strange |
| 3 | Aug 22, 1995 | Fred Meyer Challenge (with (Australia) Greg Norman) | −13 (65-64=129) | Playoff | (United States) Paul Azinger and (United States) Payne Stewart |
| 4 | Aug 20, 1996 | Fred Meyer Challenge (2) (with (Australia) Greg Norman) | −18 (63-61=124) | 1 stroke | (United States) Mark Calcavecchia and (United States) Billy Mayfair |
| 5 | Aug 5, 1997 | Fred Meyer Challenge (3) (with (Australia) Greg Norman) | −19 (60-63=123) | 3 strokes | (United States) Jay Haas and (United States) Phil Mickelson |
| 6 | Aug 24, 1999 | Fred Meyer Challenge (4) (with (United States) Billy Andrade) | −22 (61-61=122) | 2 strokes | (Australia) Steve Elkington and (United States) Craig Stadler, (United States) Jim Furyk and (United States) John Huston |
| 7 | Nov 19, 2000 | Franklin Templeton Shootout (2) (with (United States) Scott McCarron) | −26 (64-66-60=190) | Playoff | (Paraguay) Carlos Franco and (United States) Scott Hoch |
| 8 | Aug 7, 2001 | Fred Meyer Challenge (5) (with (United States) Billy Andrade) | −24 (60-60=120) | 2 strokes | (France) Jean van de Velde and (United States) Fuzzy Zoeller |
| 9 | Nov 11, 2001 | Franklin Templeton Shootout (3) (with (United States) Scott McCarron) | −33 (64-62-57=183) | 2 strokes | (United States) John Daly and (United States) Frank Lickliter |

Other playoff record (2–3)

| No. | Year | Tournament | Opponents | Result |
|---|---|---|---|---|
| 1 | 1995 | Fred Meyer Challenge (with (Australia) Greg Norman) | (United States) Paul Azinger and (United States) Payne Stewart | Won with birdie on first extra hole |
| 2 | 2000 | Franklin Templeton Shootout (with (United States) Scott McCarron) | (Paraguay) Carlos Franco and (United States) Scott Hoch | Won with birdie on first extra hole |
| 3 | 2001 | CVS Charity Classic (with (South Africa) Gary Player) | (United States) Mark Calcavecchia and (Zimbabwe) Nick Price | Lost to birdie on first extra hole |
| 4 | 2003 | Franklin Templeton Shootout (with (United States) Scott McCarron) | (United States) Chad Campbell and (United States) Shaun Micheel, (United States) Hank Kuehne and (United States) Jeff Sluman | Kuehne/Sluman won with birdie on second extra hole |
| 5 | 2006 | CVS/pharmacy Charity Classic (with (Canada) Mike Weir) | (South Africa) Tim Clark and (Zimbabwe) Nick Price | Lost to birdie on second extra hole |

=== Champions Tour wins (2) ===
| No. | Date | Tournament | Winning score | Margin of victory | Runner(s)-up |
|---|---|---|---|---|---|
| 1 | Oct 9, 2011 | Insperity Championship | −10 (69-65=134) (Note: Shortened to 36 holes due to weather.) | 1 stroke | (United States) Tommy Armour III |
| 2 | Apr 28, 2013 | Liberty Mutual Insurance Legends of Golf (with (United States) Jeff Sluman) | −23 (62-66-65=193) | 1 stroke | (United States) Fred Funk and (United States) Mike Goodes, (United States) Kenny Perry and (United States) Gene Sauers |

== Results in major championships ==
| Tournament | 1981 | 1982 | 1983 | 1984 | 1985 | 1986 | 1987 | 1988 | 1989 |
|---|---|---|---|---|---|---|---|---|---|
| Masters Tournament | | | | | | | | | |
| U.S. Open | CUT | CUT | T50LA | | 57 | | | CUT | T33 |
| The Open Championship | | | | | CUT | | | T11 | T73 |
| PGA Championship | | | | | CUT | CUT | CUT | CUT | CUT |

| Tournament | 1990 | 1991 | 1992 | 1993 | 1994 | 1995 | 1996 | 1997 | 1998 | 1999 |
|---|---|---|---|---|---|---|---|---|---|---|
| Masters Tournament | | | T31 | T9 | T15 | T17 | T25 | CUT | T26 | T24 |
| U.S. Open | 66 | CUT | CUT | T68 | T33 | T56 | T82 | T65 | T49 | |
| The Open Championship | | | | CUT | 7 | T15 | T33 | T20 | T11 | |
| PGA Championship | CUT | T48 | T15 | T14 | T30 | 5 | T17 | CUT | T13 | T61 |

| Tournament | 2000 | 2001 | 2002 | 2003 | 2004 | 2005 | 2006 |
|---|---|---|---|---|---|---|---|
| Masters Tournament | | T10 | T12 | T23 | T31 | | |
| U.S. Open | CUT | CUT | T66 | CUT | CUT | | |
| The Open Championship | | T47 | CUT | T46 | T60 | T23 | |
| PGA Championship | T27 | T59 | T29 | CUT | T13 | CUT | CUT |

Top 10
Did not play

LA = Low Amateur
CUT = missed the half-way cut
"T" indicates a tie for a place

=== Summary ===
| Tournament | Wins | 2nd | 3rd | Top-5 | Top-10 | Top-25 | Events | Cuts made |
|---|---|---|---|---|---|---|---|---|
| Masters Tournament | 0 | 0 | 0 | 0 | 2 | 8 | 12 | 11 |
| U.S. Open | 0 | 0 | 0 | 0 | 0 | 0 | 18 | 11 |
| The Open Championship | 0 | 0 | 0 | 0 | 1 | 6 | 14 | 11 |
| PGA Championship | 0 | 0 | 0 | 1 | 1 | 6 | 22 | 12 |
| Totals | 0 | 0 | 0 | 1 | 4 | 20 | 66 | 45 |

- Most consecutive cuts made – 13 (1993 PGA – 1996 PGA)
- Longest streak of top-10s – 1 (four times)

== Results in The Players Championship ==
| Tournament | 1984 | 1985 | 1986 | 1987 | 1988 | 1989 | 1990 | 1991 | 1992 | 1993 | 1994 | 1995 | 1996 | 1997 | 1998 | 1999 | 2000 | 2001 | 2002 | 2003 | 2004 | 2005 | 2006 |
|---|---|---|---|---|---|---|---|---|---|---|---|---|---|---|---|---|---|---|---|---|---|---|---|
| The Players Championship | T33 | CUT | CUT | CUT | CUT | T17 | T70 | CUT | T67 | DQ | T6 | T49 | | 4 | T35 | T46 | T77 | T26 | T36 | T11 | T42 | T46 | T16 |

Top 10
Did not play

CUT = missed the halfway cut
DQ = disqualified
"T" indicates a tie for a place

== Results in World Golf Championships ==
| Tournament | 1999 | 2000 | 2001 | 2002 | 2003 | 2004 |
|---|---|---|---|---|---|---|
| Match Play | R64 | | QF | 3 | R32 | R64 |
| Championship | | | NT^{1} | T49 | T16 | T13 |
| Invitational | | | | T63 | T9 | T32 |

^{1}Cancelled due to 9/11

Top 10
Did not play

QF, R16, R32, R64 = Round in which player lost in match play
"T" = Tied
NT = No tournament

== U.S. national team appearances ==
Amateur

- Walker Cup: 1983 (winners)

Professional

- Ryder Cup: 1995, 1997
- Dunhill Cup: 1997
- UBS Cup: 2003 (tie)

== See also ==
- 1983 PGA Tour Qualifying School graduates
