= Nolan Henke =

American golfer (born 1964)

Personal information
- Full name: Nolan Jay Henke
- Nationality: United States
- Born: November 25, 1964 (age 61) Battle Creek, Michigan, U.S.
- Height: 6 ft 0 in (1.83 m)
- Weight: 165 lb (75 kg; 11.8 st)

Career
- Sport: Golf
- College: Florida State University
- Turned professional: 1987
- Current tour: Champions Tour
- Former tour: PGA Tour
- Professional wins: 4
- Highest ranking: 42 (August 15, 1993)

Number of wins by tour
- PGA Tour: 3

Best results in major championships
- Masters Tournament: T6: 1992
- PGA Championship: T6: 1993
- U.S. Open: 7th/T7: 1991, 1993
- The Open Championship: T38: 1991

Nolan Jay Henke (born November 25, 1964) is an American professional golfer. He has played on the PGA Tour and the Nationwide Tour.

== Early life and amateur career ==
In 1964, Henke was born in Battle Creek, Michigan. He attended Florida State University in Tallahassee, Florida and was a distinguished member of the golf team. During his years at Florida State, Henke won seven tournaments and was an All-American for three consecutive years: 1985 – 1987.

== Professional career ==
In 1987, Henke turned professional. He joined the PGA Tour after his success at 1988 PGA Tour Qualifying School.

In the early 1990s, Henke won three PGA Tour events. His first win came at the 1990 B.C. Open. In 1991, he won the Phoenix Open, finished 5th on the money list, and had six top-10 finishes. His third win came in 1993 at the BellSouth Classic. His best finish in a major has been T6 at both the 1992 Masters Tournament and the 1993 PGA Championship.

As he has grown older, Henke has had difficulty maintaining his PGA Tour privileges, and has had to play some events on the Nationwide Tour. His best finish in this venue is a T-4 at the 2002 Preferred Health Systems Wichita Open.

In 2015, Henke began playing on the Champions Tour.

== Personal life ==
Henke lives in Fort Myers, Florida. Each year, he hosts a charity event in Fort Myers to benefit Southwest Florida Children's Hospital and Hope Hospice House.

Henke has also teamed with Patty Berg to promote the development of young players by sponsoring the Nolan Henke/Patty Berg Junior Masters tournament.

== Amateur wins ==
- 1985 Seminole Classic, Panhandle Intercollegiate, Forest Hills Invitational
- 1986 Porter Cup, Florida Intercollegiate
- 1987 American Amateur, Monroe Invitational, Seminole Golf Classic, South Florida Invitational, Jerry Pate Invitational, Metro Conference Championship

== Professional wins (4) ==
=== PGA Tour wins (3) ===
No.	Date	Tournament	Winning score	Margin of victory	Runner(s)-up
1	Sep 23, 1990	B.C. Open	−18 (66-64-70-68=268)	3 strokes	(United States) Mark Wiebe
2	Jan 27, 1991	Phoenix Open	−16 (65-66-66-71=268)	1 stroke	(United States) Gil Morgan, (United States) Curtis Strange, (United States) Tom Watson
3	May 9, 1993	BellSouth Classic	−17 (67-69-68-67=271)	2 strokes	(United States) Mark Calcavecchia, (Zimbabwe) Nick Price, (United States) Tom Sieckmann

PGA Tour playoff record (0–1)

No.	Year	Tournament	Opponents	Result
1	1995	MCI Classic	(South Africa) David Frost, (United States) Bob Tway	Tway won with par on second extra hole Frost eliminated by par on first hole

=== Other wins (1) ===
- 1988 South Florida Open

== Results in major championships ==
Tournament	1989	1990	1991	1992	1993	1994	1995	1996	1997	1998	1999
Masters Tournament			T53	T6	T27	CUT					
U.S. Open	T21		7	CUT	T7	CUT					
The Open Championship			T38								
PGA Championship			T57	CUT	T6	CUT	T23	T69			CUT

Top 10
Did not play

CUT = missed the half-way cut
"T" = tied

=== Summary ===
Tournament	Wins	2nd	3rd	Top-5	Top-10	Top-25	Events	Cuts made
Masters Tournament	0	0	0	0	1	1	4	3
U.S. Open	0	0	0	0	2	3	5	3
The Open Championship	0	0	0	0	0	0	1	1
PGA Championship	0	0	0	0	1	2	7	4
Totals	0	0	0	0	4	6	17	11

- Most consecutive cuts made – 6 (1989 U.S. Open – 1992 Masters)
- Longest streak of top-10s – 2 (1993 U.S. Open – 1993 PGA)

== See also ==
- 1988 PGA Tour Qualifying School graduates
- 1989 PGA Tour Qualifying School graduates
- List of Florida State Seminoles men's golfers
