= Rocco Mediate =

American professional golfer (born 1962)

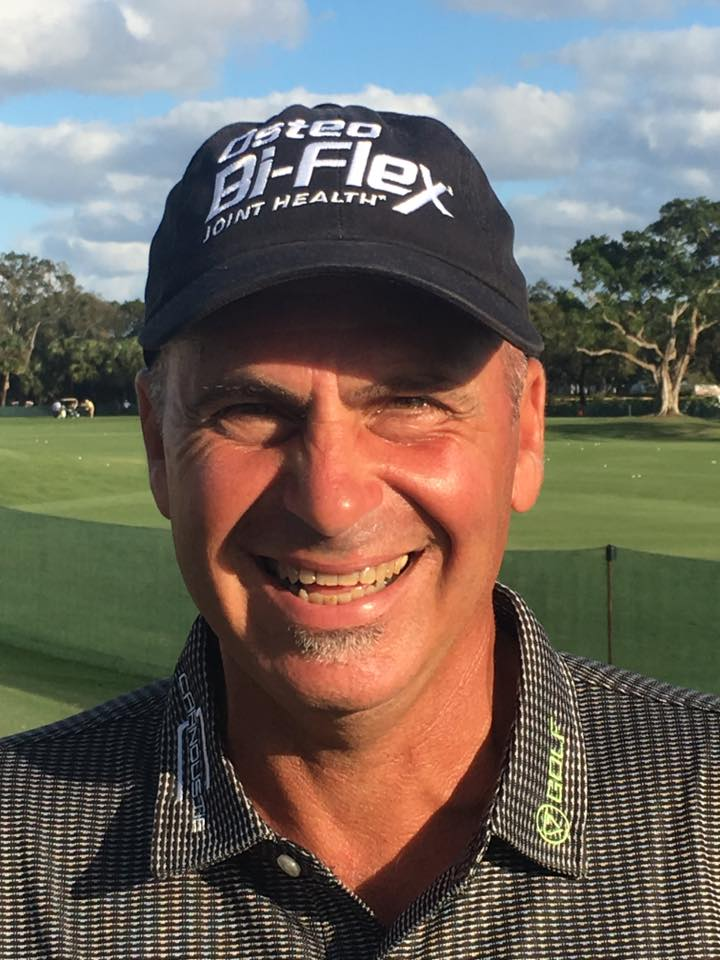
- Mediate in 2017

Personal information
- Full name: Rocco Anthony Mediate
- Nationality: United States
- Born: December 17, 1962 (age 63) Greensburg, Pennsylvania, U.S.
- Height: 6 ft 1 in (1.85 m)
- Weight: 190 lb (86 kg; 14 st)
- Spouse: Jessica Mediate
- Children: 4

Career
- Sport: Golf
- College: Florida Southern College
- Turned professional: 1985
- Current tour: PGA Tour Champions
- Former tour: PGA Tour
- Professional wins: 14
- Highest ranking: 12 (April 28, 2002)

Number of wins by tour
- PGA Tour: 6
- PGA Tour Champions: 5
- Other: 3

Best results in major championships
- Masters Tournament: T15: 2001
- PGA Championship: 6th: 2002
- U.S. Open: 2nd: 2008
- The Open Championship: T18: 1996

Achievements and awards
- Champions Tour Rookie of the Year: 2013

Rocco Anthony Mediate (born December 17, 1962) is an American professional golfer who has won six times on the PGA Tour and five times on the PGA Tour Champions. In the 2008 U.S. Open at Torrey Pines South Course, he finished runner-up after losing the first sudden-death hole after an 18-hole playoff to Tiger Woods. In 2016, Mediate won the Senior PGA Championship, one of the five senior majors.

== Early life ==
Mediate was born in Greensburg, Pennsylvania. According to the Golf Channel, he is the son of a barber and has Italian ancestral heritage. Mediate attended Hempfield Area High School.

== Amateur career ==
Mediate attended Florida Southern College and was a member of the golf team. His close friend Lee Janzen, another PGA Tour pro, also played there.

== Professional career ==
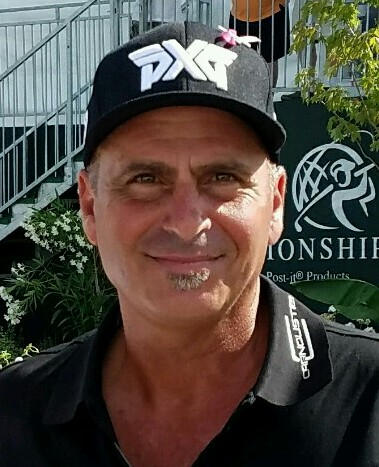
Mediate in 2016

Mediate turned professional in 1985. His golfing career has been marred by back trouble. Early on, he compensated by using a long putter. In 1991 he became the first player to win on the PGA Tour using a long putter when he won the Doral-Ryder Open. He picked up another victory at the 1993 KMart Greater Greensboro Open, but he then had a long layoff due to a ruptured disk. He underwent major back surgery in 1999, but lost practically five years of his career. Back pain returned in 2004 and later nearly ended his career.

Mediate returned to the Tour in 1996 playing under a special medical extension and performed steadily. He picked up wins on the Tour in 1999, 2000 and 2002. After improving his fitness to minimize his back problems, he returned to using a conventional putter in 2003.

On October 9, 2006, it was announced that Mediate would become an on-course reporter for The Golf Channel's 2007 PGA Tour coverage.

Mediate has been featured in the top 20 of the Official World Golf Ranking and considered to be one of the best putters in golf. At the 2006 Masters, Mediate was in contention to win the event on the final day until he took a septuple-bogey ten on the par-three 12th hole. His best finish in a major championship was a second-place showing at the 2008 U.S. Open at Torrey Pines South Course. Tied with Tiger Woods at -1 after regular tournament play, then tied again at even par through the 18 hole playoff, Woods finally bested Mediate on the first hole (hole #7) of sudden death, the 91st hole of the tournament. It was only the third time a U.S. Open playoff had gone to sudden death. Mediate's performance gained him 111 spots in the world golf rankings, moving him from 158th to 47th place.

Mediate earned his first win since 2002 at the 2010 Frys.com Open by beating Bo Van Pelt and Alex Prugh by one shot. During the tournament, Mediate holed out all four days. He started on Thursday, with a hole-in-one on the 189 yard par-3 3rd hole. On Friday, he holed out from 160 yards on the par-4 4th hole for an eagle, followed on Saturday with a hole-out from 111 yards on the par-5 15th hole, also for eagle. On Sunday, he was tied for the lead on the 17th hole when he holed from 116 yards for eagle to take a two-shot lead. He parred the 18th to win the tournament. He also became the oldest wire-to-wire winner on the PGA Tour since at least 1970.

Mediate has PGA Tour career earnings of over $16 million.

Mediate joined the Champions Tour for 2013 after turning 50 and his exemption for his 2010 PGA Tour win ended. He won in his debut at the Allianz Championship, the 16th Champions Tour player to do so. After shooting a 61 in the second round, he claimed victory by two strokes over Bernhard Langer and Tom Pernice Jr. with a birdie at the last hole. He won his second Champions Tour tournament that September, at the Shaw Charity Classic. Mediate finished seven strokes ahead of runner-up, Tom Byrum.

In May 2016, Mediate won his first senior major championship at the Senior PGA Championship, with a three-stroke victory over the defending champion Colin Montgomerie. His winning total of 265 (−19) broke the previous record by three and was the first wire-to-wire victory at the event since Jack Nicklaus in 1991. His victory was sealed when he holed out from a greenside bunker on the 71st hole of regulation play for birdie.

On September 22, 2019, Mediate won the Sanford International on the PGA Tour Champions in South Dakota.

== Personal life ==
Mediate is a distant cousin of Puerto Rico Islanders soccer player Domenic Mediate.

== Professional wins (14) ==
=== PGA Tour wins (6) ===
No.	Date	Tournament	Winning score	Margin of victory	Runner(s)-up
1	Mar 4, 1991	Doral-Ryder Open	−12 (66-70-68-72=276)	Playoff	(United States) Curtis Strange
2	Apr 25, 1993	KMart Greater Greensboro Open	−7 (74-67-71-69=281)	Playoff	(Australia) Steve Elkington
3	Jan 31, 1999	Phoenix Open	−11 (69-67-66-71=273)	2 strokes	(United States) Justin Leonard
4	Aug 13, 2000	Buick Open	−20 (68-64-70-66=268)	1 stroke	(United States) Chris Perry
5	Apr 28, 2002	Greater Greensboro Chrysler Classic (2)	−16 (68-67-66-71=272)	3 strokes	(United States) Mark Calcavecchia
6	Oct 17, 2010	Frys.com Open	−15 (64-65-67-73=269)	1 stroke	(United States) Alex Prugh, (United States) Bo Van Pelt

PGA Tour playoff record (2–1)

No.	Year	Tournament	Opponent	Result
1	1991	Doral-Ryder Open	(United States) Curtis Strange	Won with birdie on first extra hole
2	1993	KMart Greater Greensboro Open	(Australia) Steve Elkington	Won with birdie on fourth extra hole
3	2008	U.S. Open	(United States) Tiger Woods	Lost to par on first extra hole after 18-hole playoff; Woods: E (71), Mediate: E (71)

=== Other wins (3) ===
No.	Date	Tournament	Winning score	Margin of victory	Runner(s)-up
1	Nov 21, 1999	Callaway Golf Pebble Beach Invitational	−6 (70-76-68-68=282)	1 stroke	(Sweden) Annika Sörenstam
2	Nov 24, 2002	Franklin Templeton Shootout (with (United States) Lee Janzen)	−31 (65-60-60=185)	1 stroke	(United States) David Gossett and (United States) Matt Kuchar, (United States) John Huston and (United States) Jeff Maggert
3	Jun 24, 2003	CVS Charity Classic (with (United States) Jeff Sluman)	−22 (63-57=120)	1 stroke	(United States) Billy Andrade and (United States) Brad Faxon

Other playoff record (0–1)

No.	Year	Tournament	Opponents	Result
1	2008	CVS Caremark Charity Classic (with (United States) Brandt Snedeker)	(United States) Billy Andrade and (United States) Davis Love III, (United States) Paul Goydos and (United States) Tim Herron, (Colombia) Camilo Villegas and (United States) Bubba Watson	Villegas/Watson won by 1 stroke in three-hole aggregate playoff

=== PGA Tour Champions wins (5) ===
Legend
Senior major championships (1)
Other PGA Tour Champions (4)

No.	Date	Tournament	Winning score	Margin of victory	Runner(s)-up
1	Feb 10, 2013	Allianz Championship	−17 (67-61-71=199)	2 strokes	(Germany) Bernhard Langer, (United States) Tom Pernice Jr.
2	Sep 1, 2013	Shaw Charity Classic	−22 (63-64-64-191)	7 strokes	(United States) Tom Byrum
3	May 29, 2016	Senior PGA Championship	−19 (62-66-71-66=265)	3 strokes	(Scotland) Colin Montgomerie
4	Sep 22, 2019	Sanford International	−9 (69-68-64=201)	2 strokes	(United States) Ken Duke, (United States) Bob Estes, (Scotland) Colin Montgomerie
5	Oct 6, 2024	Constellation Furyk and Friends	−12 (67-66-71=204)	Playoff	(United States) Bob Estes

PGA Tour Champions playoff record (1–0)

No.	Year	Tournament	Opponent	Result
1	2024	Constellation Furyk and Friends	(United States) Bob Estes	Won with par on second extra hole

== Results in major championships ==
Tournament	1984	1985	1986	1987	1988	1989
Masters Tournament						
U.S. Open	CUT					
The Open Championship						
PGA Championship					T31	

Tournament	1990	1991	1992	1993	1994	1995	1996	1997	1998	1999
Masters Tournament		T22	T37							T27
U.S. Open		CUT	T44	T25	WD					T34
The Open Championship		CUT	T45	T39			T18			CUT
PGA Championship	T69	T16	T40	T68			T36		CUT	T49

Tournament	2000	2001	2002	2003	2004	2005	2006	2007	2008	2009
Masters Tournament	T52	T15	T36	T33	CUT		T36			T49
U.S. Open	T32	4	T37	CUT		T6	CUT		2	T47
The Open Championship	T52	WD	T47						T19	
PGA Championship	WD	T66	6	T18	CUT			WD	72	

Tournament	2010	2011	2012	2013	2014	2015	2016
Masters Tournament							
U.S. Open	CUT						
The Open Championship							
PGA Championship		WD					CUT

Top 10
Did not play

CUT = missed the half-way cut
WD = Withdrew
"T" = tied

=== Summary ===
Tournament	Wins	2nd	3rd	Top-5	Top-10	Top-25	Events	Cuts made
Masters Tournament	0	0	0	0	0	2	10	9
U.S. Open	0	1	0	2	3	4	15	9
The Open Championship	0	0	0	0	0	2	9	6
PGA Championship	0	0	0	0	1	3	17	11
Totals	0	1	0	2	4	11	51	35

- Most consecutive cuts made – 8 (1991 PGA – 1993 PGA)
- Longest streak of top-10s – 1 (four times)

== Results in The Players Championship ==
Tournament	1987	1988	1989
The Players Championship	T50	CUT	T11

Tournament	1990	1991	1992	1993	1994	1995	1996	1997	1998	1999
The Players Championship	T11	T15	CUT	T6		T55	T4	CUT	T57	CUT

Tournament	2000	2001	2002	2003	2004	2005	2006	2007	2008	2009
The Players Championship	CUT	T65	3	T45			T58	T44	T54	T60

Tournament	2010	2011
The Players Championship		T54

Top 10
Did not play

CUT = missed the halfway cut
"T" indicates a tie for a place

== Results in World Golf Championships ==
Tournament	1999	2000	2001	2002	2003	2004	2005	2006	2007	2008
Match Play	R64	R64		R32	R32	R64				
Championship			NT^{1}	T24						
Invitational		WD		T15	T16					T52

^{1}Cancelled due to 9/11

Did not play

QF, R16, R32, R64 = Round in which player lost in match play
WD = Withdrew
"T" = tied
NT = No Tournament

== Senior major championships ==
=== Wins (1) ===
Year	Championship	54 holes	Winning score	Margin	Runner-up
2016	Senior PGA Championship	2 shot lead	−19 (62-66-71-66=265)	3 strokes	(Scotland) Colin Montgomerie

=== Results timeline ===
Results not in chronological order

Tournament	2013	2014	2015	2016	2017	2018	2019	2020	2021	2022	2023	2024	2025	2026
Senior PGA Championship	T20	WD	T26	1	CUT	T64	T12	NT	T23	WD	T63			WD
The Tradition	35	T6		T38	T42	T8	T12	NT		T40	T65	WD		T24
U.S. Senior Open	T3	T26	T20	CUT	CUT	T14	T47	NT	T52	T18	CUT	T12	CUT	
Senior Players Championship	T22	T22	T26	78	T60	T20	T63	T67	T7	T17	T32	T21	T57	74
Senior British Open Championship	T18		T40					NT						

Win
Top 10
Did not play

CUT = missed the halfway cut
WD = withdrew
"T" indicates a tie for a place
NT = no tournament due to COVID-19 pandemic

== U.S. national team appearances ==
Professional

- UBS Cup: 2003 (tie)
- Wendy's 3-Tour Challenge (representing PGA Tour): 2000 (winners), 2008

== See also ==
- 1985 PGA Tour Qualifying School graduates
- 1986 PGA Tour Qualifying School graduates
