= Ted Schulz =

American professional golfer

Personal information
- Full name: Theodore James Schulz
- Nationality: United States
- Born: October 29, 1959 (age 67) Louisville, Kentucky, U.S.
- Height: 6 ft 2 in (1.88 m)
- Weight: 190 lb (86 kg; 14 st)

Career
- Sport: Golf
- College: University of Louisville
- Turned professional: 1984
- Former tours: PGA Tour; Champions Tour
- Professional wins: 7
- Highest ranking: 75 (May 19, 1991)

Number of wins by tour
- PGA Tour: 2
- PGA Tour Champions: 1
- Other: 4

Best results in major championships
- Masters Tournament: T6: 1992
- PGA Championship: T69: 1992
- U.S. Open: T33: 1990
- The Open Championship: DNP

Theodore James Schulz (born October 29, 1959) is an American professional golfer who has played on the PGA Tour, Nationwide Tour, and Champions Tour.

== Early life and amateur career ==
Schulz was born, raised, and has lived his entire life in Louisville, Kentucky. He attended the University of Louisville from 1977 to 1981 and was a member of the golf team.

== Professional career ==
In 1984, Schulz joined the PGA Tour. He has 15 top-10 finishes in PGA Tour events including two wins. His career year was 1991 when he had five top-10 finishes including a win at the Nissan Los Angeles Open, and finished 29th on the money list. His best finish in a major championship was T6 at the 1992 Masters Tournament. Schulz lost his Tour card in 1994. After that he played mostly in Nationwide Tour events, where his best finish is a T-13 at the 1995 NIKE Central Georgia Open.

Schulz became eligible to compete on the Champions Tour at the start of the 2010 season, and scored his first victory on the senior circuit at the Home Care & Hospice First Tee Open at Pebble Beach in September of that year.

Schulz volunteers as an assistant golf coach at the University of Louisville.

== Personal life ==
Schulz and his wife Diane have three children.

== Awards and honors ==
Schulz is a member of the University of Louisville Athletic Hall of Fame

== Amateur wins ==
- 1983 Kentucky State Amateur

== Professional wins (7) ==
=== PGA Tour wins (2) ===
| No. | Date | Tournament | Winning score | Margin of victory | Runner(s)-up |
|---|---|---|---|---|---|
| 1 | Sep 24, 1989 | Southern Open | −14 (66-66-68-66=266) | 1 stroke | (United States) Jay Haas, (United States) Tim Simpson |
| 2 | Feb 24, 1991 | Nissan Los Angeles Open | −12 (69-66-69-68=272) | 1 stroke | (United States) Jeff Sluman |

PGA Tour playoff record (0–1)

| No. | Year | Tournament | Opponents | Result |
|---|---|---|---|---|
| 1 | 1993 | Greater Milwaukee Open | (United States) Mark Calcavecchia, (United States) Billy Mayfair | Mayfair won with birdie on fourth extra hole Schulz eliminated by par on first hole |

=== Other wins (4) ===
- 1984 Kentucky Open
- 1988 Kentucky Open
- 1989 Chrysler Team Championship (with David Ogrin), Jerry Ford Invitational (tie with Donnie Hammond)

=== Champions Tour wins (1) ===
| No. | Date | Tournament | Winning score | Margin of victory | Runner-up |
|---|---|---|---|---|---|
| 1 | Sep 5, 2010 | Home Care & Hospice First Tee Open at Pebble Beach | −14 (68-64-70=202) | 1 stroke | (United States) Tom Pernice Jr. |

== Results in major championships ==
| Tournament | 1989 | 1990 | 1991 | 1992 | 1993 |
|---|---|---|---|---|---|
| Masters Tournament | | CUT | CUT | T6 | T39 |
| U.S. Open | | T33 | | T51 | T81 |
| PGA Championship | CUT | CUT | CUT | T69 | |

Note: Schulz never played in The Open Championship.

Top 10
Did not play

CUT = missed the half-way cut
"T" = tied

== See also ==
- 1986 PGA Tour Qualifying School graduates
- 1988 PGA Tour Qualifying School graduates
