= Billy Mayfair =

American professional golfer (born 1966)

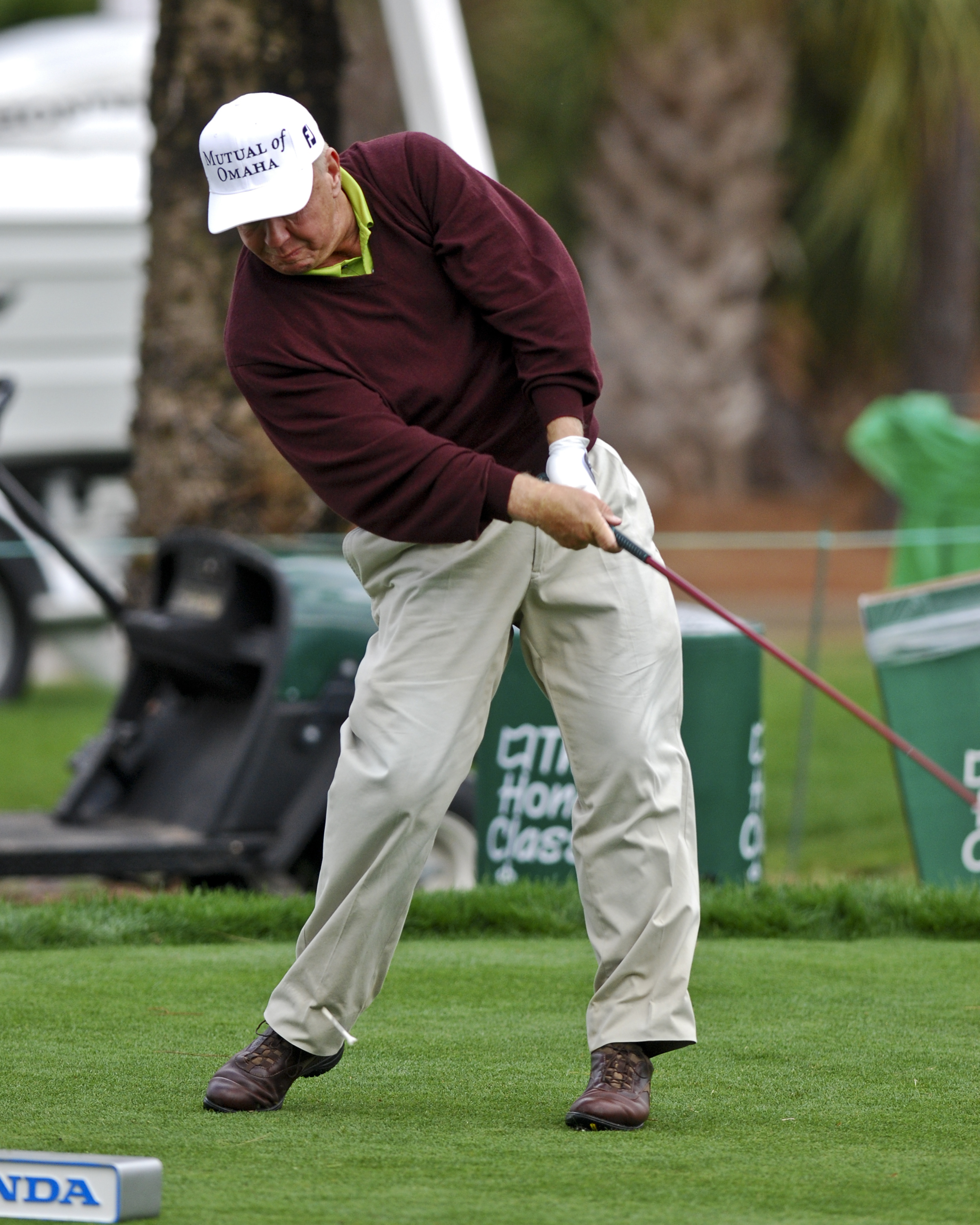

Personal information
- Full name: William Fred Mayfair
- Nationality: United States
- Born: August 6, 1966 (age 60) Phoenix, Arizona, U.S.
- Height: 5 ft 9 in (1.75 m)
- Weight: 195 lb (88 kg; 13.9 st)

Career
- Sport: Golf
- College: Arizona State University
- Turned professional: 1988
- Current tour: PGA Tour Champions
- Former tour: PGA Tour
- Professional wins: 5
- Highest ranking: 25 (June 30, 1996)

Number of wins by tour
- PGA Tour: 5

Best results in major championships
- Masters Tournament: T12: 1991
- PGA Championship: T5: 1990
- U.S. Open: T5: 2002
- The Open Championship: T3: 2001

Achievements and awards
- Haskins Award: 1987

William Fred Mayfair (born August 6, 1966) is an American professional golfer who plays on the PGA Tour Champions. He was previously a member of the PGA Tour, where he won five times, including at the 1995 Tour Championship.

== Early life ==
In 1966, Mayfair was born in Phoenix, Arizona. Before his fifteenth birthday, he won numerous junior golf tournaments. In 1981, he was on the cover of Boys' Life magazine as "golf's junior hotshot."

== Amateur career ==
Mayfair attended Arizona State University and was a member of the golf team. He won the 1986 U.S. Amateur Public Links and the 1987 U.S. Amateur, defeating University of Tennessee graduate Eric Rebmann 4&3. He won the 1987 Haskins Award for the nation's top collegiate golfer.

== Professional career ==
In 1988, Mayfair turned professional. and has won five events on the PGA Tour, including the 1995 Tour Championship. He has featured in the top 50 of the Official World Golf Rankings, going as high as 26th in 1996. He holds the distinction of being the only player to ever beat Tiger Woods in a playoff on the PGA Tour (1998 Nissan Open).

Mayfair was the medalist at the 2010 PGA Tour's Qualifying School. He finished 142nd on the Tour money list that year, which granted him conditional status for 2011. He finished the 2011 season 109th on the money list and retained his tour card for 2012. In 2013 and 2014 Mayfair split his playing time between the PGA Tour and the Web.com Tour, playing mostly on the Web.com Tour in 2014.

During his PGA Tour career, Mayfair made 761 starts and earned over $20.3 million.

In 2016, he joined PGA Tour Champions.

== Personal life ==
Mayfair lives in Scottsdale, Arizona, where he plays out of Estrella Mountain Ranch Golf Club.

On July 31, 2006, he was diagnosed with testicular cancer. He had surgery on August 3 of that year and it has been reported that the cancer was contained.

In April 2021 he announced that he had been diagnosed as being autistic in November 2019.

== Amateur wins ==
this list may be incomplete

- 1982 Junior PGA Championship
- 1986 U.S. Amateur Public Links
- 1987 Pacific Coast Amateur, U.S. Amateur
- 1988 Pacific Coast Amateur

== Professional wins (5) ==
=== PGA Tour wins (5) ===
Legend
Tour Championships (1)
Other PGA Tour (4)

No.	Date	Tournament	Winning score	Margin of victory	Runner(s)-up
1	Sep 5, 1993	Greater Milwaukee Open	−18 (67-66-69-68=270)	Playoff	(United States) Mark Calcavecchia, (United States) Ted Schulz
2	Jul 9, 1995	Motorola Western Open	−9 (73-70-69-67=279)	1 stroke	(United States) Jay Haas, (United States) Justin Leonard, (United States) Jeff Maggert, (United States) Scott Simpson
3	Oct 29, 1995	The Tour Championship	E (68-70-69-73=280)	3 strokes	(Australia) Steve Elkington, (United States) Corey Pavin
4	Mar 1, 1998	Nissan Open	−12 (65-71-69-67=272)	Playoff	(United States) Tiger Woods
5	Aug 9, 1998	Buick Open	−17 (70-69-65-67=271)	2 strokes	(United States) Scott Verplank

PGA Tour playoff record (2–5)

No.	Year	Tournament	Opponent(s)	Result
1	1990	Greater Milwaukee Open	(United States) Ed Dougherty, (United States) Jim Gallagher Jr.	Gallagher won with par on first extra hole
2	1990	Nabisco Championship	(United States) Jodie Mudd	Lost to birdie on first extra hole
3	1993	Greater Milwaukee Open	(United States) Mark Calcavecchia, (United States) Ted Schulz	Won with birdie on fourth extra hole Schulz eliminated by par on first hole
4	1995	Phoenix Open	(Fiji) Vijay Singh	Lost to par on first extra hole
5	1995	NEC World Series of Golf	(Australia) Greg Norman, (Zimbabwe) Nick Price	Norman won with birdie on first extra hole
6	1998	Nissan Open	(United States) Tiger Woods	Won with birdie on first extra hole
7	2001	WorldCom Classic - The Heritage of Golf	(Argentina) José Cóceres	Lost to par on fifth extra hole

== Results in major championships ==
Tournament	1988	1989
Masters Tournament	CUT	
U.S. Open	T25LA	T33
The Open Championship		
PGA Championship		

Tournament	1990	1991	1992	1993	1994	1995	1996	1997	1998	1999
Masters Tournament		T12	T42		CUT		CUT		CUT	CUT
U.S. Open	CUT	T37	T23		CUT		T32			T10
The Open Championship							T45		T52	CUT
PGA Championship	T5	CUT	CUT	T28	T39	T23	T52	T53	T7	T34

Tournament	2000	2001	2002	2003	2004	2005	2006	2007	2008	2009
Masters Tournament			T32	T37			T14	59		CUT
U.S. Open	CUT		T5	T10	66		CUT			T40
The Open Championship		T3	CUT							T52
PGA Championship	T74	CUT	CUT	T61		CUT	T37	T60	T47	

Top 10
Did not play

LA = Low Amateur
CUT = missed the half-way cut
"T" = tied

=== Summary ===
Tournament	Wins	2nd	3rd	Top-5	Top-10	Top-25	Events	Cuts made
Masters Tournament	0	0	0	0	0	2	12	6
U.S. Open	0	0	0	1	3	5	14	10
The Open Championship	0	0	1	1	1	1	6	4
PGA Championship	0	0	0	1	2	3	18	13
Totals	0	0	1	3	6	11	50	33

- Most consecutive cuts made – 4 (three times)
- Longest streak of top-10s – 1 (six times)

== Results in The Players Championship ==
Tournament	1989	1990	1991	1992	1993	1994	1995	1996	1997	1998	1999
The Players Championship	CUT	CUT	T73	T67	T52	CUT	T18	CUT	CUT	T42	CUT

Tournament	2000	2001	2002	2003	2004	2005	2006	2007	2008	2009
The Players Championship	T17	T5	CUT	CUT	T58		CUT	CUT	72	T32

Tournament	2010	2011	2012
The Players Championship			CUT

Top 10
Did not play

CUT = missed the halfway cut
"T" indicates a tie for a place

== Results in World Golf Championships ==
Tournament	1999	2000	2001	2002	2003	2004	2005	2006	2007	2008	2009
Match Play	R64	R32		R64							
Championship			NT^{1}				T25				T77
Invitational											
Champions											

^{1}Cancelled due to 9/11

Did not play

QF, R16, R32, R64 = Round in which player lost in match play
"T" = Tied
NT = No tournament
Note that the HSBC Champions did not become a WGC event until 2009.

== U.S. national team appearances ==
Amateur

- Walker Cup: 1987 (winners)

Professional

- Four Tours World Championship: 1991

== See also ==
- 1988 PGA Tour Qualifying School graduates
- 2010 PGA Tour Qualifying School graduates
