= Billy Andrade =

American professional golfer (born 1964)

Personal information
- Full name: William Thomas Andrade
- Nationality: United States
- Born: January 25, 1964 (age 62) Bristol, Rhode Island, U.S.
- Height: 5 ft 9 in (1.75 m)
- Weight: 160 lb (73 kg; 11 st)
- Spouse: Jody
- Children: Grace, Cameron

Career
- Sport: Golf
- College: Wake Forest University
- Turned professional: 1987
- Current tour: PGA Champions Tour
- Former tour: PGA Tour
- Professional wins: 13
- Highest ranking: 42 (June 2, 2002)

Number of wins by tour
- PGA Tour: 4
- PGA Tour Champions: 3
- Other: 6

Best results in major championships
- Masters Tournament: T38: 1999
- PGA Championship: 6th: 2001
- U.S. Open: T6: 1992
- The Open Championship: T13: 2001

Achievements and awards
- Payne Stewart Award: 2022

William Thomas Andrade (born January 25, 1964) is an American professional golfer who currently plays on the PGA Champions Tour. He was previously a member of the PGA Tour, where he was a four-time winner.

== Early life ==
Andrade was born in Bristol, Rhode Island. He is an American Junior Golf Association (AJGA) alum and 1981 Rolex Junior Player of the Year.

He attended the Providence Country Day School for high school and then made his way to Wake Forest University where he helped lead the Demon Deacons to the 1986 NCAA Championship. He played on the U.S. team in the 1987 Walker Cup, and turned professional in the same year.

== Professional career ==
He has four wins on the PGA Tour: the 1991 Kemper Open and Buick Classic, the 1998 Bell Canadian Open, and the 2000 Invensys Classic. He was the first golfer to win on the PGA Tour using the Titleist Pro V1 golf ball at the 2000 Invensys Classic at Las Vegas. He has been featured in the top 50 of the Official World Golf Ranking. Andrade continues to play on a limited basis, and finished T5 at the Sanderson Farms Championship on the PGA Tour in July 2013, earning $114,000. He became eligible to compete on the Champions Tour on January 25, 2014, when he turned 50 years old. He had exempt status on the Champions Tour due to his position on the career earnings money list and his multiple victories on the PGA Tour.

Andrade is also an active contributor to charity. With Brad Faxon, they run the Billy Andrade/Brad Faxon Charities for Children, Inc., a non-profit organization that, as of 2005, has donated over $3 million to needy children in Rhode Island and southern Massachusetts. Since 1999, Andrade and Faxon have also served as hosts of the CVS Charity Classic, a golf tournament held at the Rhode Island Country Club each June, whose proceeds benefit the two players' charity. Every fall Andrade and PGA Tour player Stewart Cink co-host the East Lake Invitational held at East Lake Golf Club which helps to benefit the East Lake Foundation.

== Personal life ==
Andrade resides in Atlanta, Georgia, and Bristol, Rhode Island, with his wife, Jody, and their children Cameron and Grace. Unusual for a professional golfer, he is also a Democrat.

Andrade has a close friendship with Baseball Hall of Fame pitcher Sandy Koufax whom he met at La Cumbre Country Club in Santa Barbara, California when Andrade was still a college player. Koufax, an avid golfer, regularly played at Andrade's annual charity golf tournament at Wannamoisett Country Club in Rumford, Rhode Island.

== Awards and honors ==
- In 1981, he was awarded the Rolex Junior Player of the Year
- In 1999, Andrade and Brad Faxon received the Golf Writers of America's Charlie Bartlett Award for their "unselfish contributions to society"
- In 2002, Andrade and Faxon received the American Heart Association's Gold Heart Award in recognition of their charitable efforts
- In addition, Andrade and Faxon were named winners of the Ambassadors of Golf Award in 2002
- In 2022, he received the Payne Stewart Award, given annually to a golfer who exemplifies Stewart's values of character, charitable efforts, and sportsmanship.

== Amateur wins ==
- 1981 Junior PGA Championship, Junior World Cup (with Sam Randolph)
- 1983 New England Amateur
- 1986 North and South Amateur, Sunnehanna Amateur

== Professional wins (13) ==
=== PGA Tour wins (4) ===
No.	Date	Tournament	Winning score	Margin of victory	Runner-up
1	Jun 2, 1991	Kemper Open	−21 (68-64-64-67=263)	Playoff	(United States) Jeff Sluman
2	Jun 9, 1991	Buick Classic	−9 (68-68-69-68=273)	2 strokes	(United States) Brad Bryant
3	Sep 13, 1998	Bell Canadian Open	−11 (68-69-69-69=275)	Playoff	(United States) Bob Friend
4	Oct 15, 2000	Invensys Classic at Las Vegas	−28 (67-67-63-67-68=332)	1 stroke	(United States) Phil Mickelson

PGA Tour playoff record (2–1)

No.	Year	Tournament	Opponent(s)	Result
1	1991	Kemper Open	(United States) Jeff Sluman	Won with birdie on first extra hole
2	1993	Buick Southern Open	(United States) Mark Brooks, (United States) Brad Bryant, (United States) Bob Estes, (United States) John Inman	Inman won with birdie on second extra hole Andrade, Brooks and Bryant eliminated by birdie on first hole
3	1998	Bell Canadian Open	(United States) Bob Friend	Won with par on first extra hole

=== Other wins (6) ===
- 1987 Rhode Island Open
- 1991 JCPenney Classic (with Kris Tschetter)
- 1992 Fred Meyer Challenge (with Tom Kite)
- 1994 Ernst Championship
- 1999 Fred Meyer Challenge (with Brad Faxon)
- 2001 Fred Meyer Challenge (with Brad Faxon)

=== PGA Tour Champions wins (3) ===
Legend
Tour Championships (1)
Other PGA Tour Champions (2)

No.	Date	Tournament	Winning score	Margin of victory	Runner(s)-up
1	Apr 26, 2015	Big Cedar Lodge Legends of Golf (with (United States) Joe Durant)	−19 (63-51-45=159)	3 strokes	(Scotland) Sandy Lyle and (Wales) Ian Woosnam
2	Aug 23, 2015	Boeing Classic	−9 (69-65-73=207)	1 stroke	(Germany) Bernhard Langer
3	Nov 8, 2015	Charles Schwab Cup Championship	−14 (65-67-70-64=266)	Playoff	(Germany) Bernhard Langer

PGA Tour Champions playoff record (1–3)

No.	Year	Tournament	Opponent	Result
1	2014	Shaw Charity Classic	(United States) Fred Couples	Lost to birdie on first extra hole
2	2015	Charles Schwab Cup Championship	(Germany) Bernhard Langer	Won with birdie on first extra hole
3	2016	Allianz Championship	(Mexico) Esteban Toledo	Lost to par on third extra hole
4	2019	PURE Insurance Championship	(United States) Kirk Triplett	Lost to birdie on first extra hole

== Results in major championships ==
! Tournament	1987	1988	1989
Masters Tournament	CUT		
U.S. Open		CUT	
The Open Championship	T54		
PGA Championship			CUT

! Tournament	1990	1991	1992	1993	1994	1995	1996	1997	1998	1999
Masters Tournament			T54	61					CUT	T38
U.S. Open		CUT	T6	T33		T21	T23	T13	CUT	
The Open Championship			T25	CUT		CUT		70		CUT
PGA Championship	T14	T32	T12	CUT	T47	CUT	CUT	CUT	T44	CUT

! Tournament	2000	2001	2002	2003	2004	2005	2006
Masters Tournament			CUT				
U.S. Open		CUT	CUT	CUT			
The Open Championship		T13	CUT				CUT
PGA Championship		6	CUT	T10	CUT	CUT	T41

Top 10
Did not play

CUT = missed the half-way cut
"T" indicates a tie for a place.

=== Summary ===
Tournament	Wins	2nd	3rd	Top-5	Top-10	Top-25	Events	Cuts made
Masters Tournament	0	0	0	0	0	0	6	3
U.S. Open	0	0	0	0	1	4	11	5
The Open Championship	0	0	0	0	0	2	9	4
PGA Championship	0	0	0	0	2	4	17	8
Totals	0	0	0	0	3	10	43	20

- Most consecutive cuts made – 7 (1991 PGA – 1993 U.S. Open)
- Longest streak of top-10s – 1 (three times)

== Results in The Players Championship ==
Tournament	1990	1991	1992	1993	1994	1995	1996	1997	1998	1999
The Players Championship	CUT	T27	CUT	T20	CUT	T8	CUT	5	T35	T62

Tournament	2000	2001	2002	2003	2004	2005	2006	2007
The Players Championship	CUT	T44	T4	T48	CUT	CUT	CUT	CUT

Top 10

CUT = missed the halfway cut
"T" indicates a tie for a place

== Results in World Golf Championships ==
Tournament	2002
Match Play	R64
Championship	
Invitational	

Did not play

QF, R16, R32, R64 = Round in which player lost in match play

== Results in senior major championships ==
Results not in chronological order.

Tournament	2014	2015	2016	2017	2018	2019	2020	2021	2022	2023	2024	2025	2026
Senior PGA Championship	T48	T34	T5	T3	T45	T8	NT	T14	72	T59	T34	66	68
The Tradition		T13	T23		T34	T2	NT	T10	T21	T23	T57	T63	T68
U.S. Senior Open	64	T5	T48	T23	T16	T33	NT	T42		T27	T31	T13	T14
Senior Players Championship	T33	T7	T25	T46	T59	T18	T33	T63	58	T32	T17	T68	
Senior British Open Championship		T19	T9	T3	T12	T24	NT					75	CUT

Top 10
Did not play

"T" indicates a tie for a place
NT = no tournament due to COVID-19 pandemic

== U.S. national team appearances ==
Amateur

- Eisenhower Trophy: 1986
- Walker Cup: 1987 (winners)

Professional

- CVS Health Charity Classic: 2017 (winners), 2018 (winners)

== See also ==
- 1987 PGA Tour Qualifying School graduates
- 1988 PGA Tour Qualifying School graduates
