= Mark Brooks (golfer) =

American professional golfer (born 1961)

Personal information
- Full name: Mark David Brooks
- Nationality: United States
- Born: March 25, 1961 (age 65) Fort Worth, Texas, U.S.
- Height: 5 ft 9 in (1.75 m)
- Weight: 150 lb (68 kg; 11 st)

Career
- Sport: Golf
- College: University of Texas
- Turned professional: 1983
- Current tours: PGA Tour Champions; European Senior Tour
- Former tour: PGA Tour
- Professional wins: 10
- Highest ranking: 18 (November 17, 1996)

Number of wins by tour
- PGA Tour: 7
- European Tour: 1
- Other: 3

Best results in major championships (wins: 1)
- Masters Tournament: T24: 2002
- PGA Championship: Won: 1996
- U.S. Open: 2nd: 2001
- The Open Championship: T3: 1995

Mark David Brooks (born March 25, 1961) is an American professional golfer who plays on the PGA Tour Champions.

== Early life and amateur career ==
Brooks was born in Fort Worth, Texas. He attended the University of Texas at Austin, where he was a three-time All-American as a member of the golf team.

== Professional career ==
Brooks turned professional in 1983. He has seven wins on the PGA Tour, including one major, the 1996 PGA Championship. He was a member of the U.S. Presidents Cup team in 1996.

During his thirties, Brooks began a second career in golf course design, and was a partner in the firm of Knott-Linn-Brooks House based in Palo Alto, California. His first major project, Southern Oaks Golf Club outside Fort Worth, opened in 1999.

After his 50th birthday in 2011, Brooks joined the Champions Tour. He came close to his first victory in June at the Principal Charity Classic, but bogeys on his final two holes allowed Bob Gilder to win by one shot. The solo 2nd-place finish was Brooks' best on any tour since his runner-up finish to Retief Goosen at the 2001 U.S. Open. In August 2014, Brooks again finished in solo second on the Champions Tour, after losing a sudden death playoff to Scott Dunlap at the Boeing Classic.

In 2015 Brooks was hired by Fox Sports as an-course analyst for the network's U.S. Open coverage. Brooks is a co-host of the Fifteenth Club radio show with Scotty Sayers, Ed Clements, and Ben Clements.

Brooks has the record for most starts on the PGA Tour with 803.

== Amateur wins (3) ==
this list may be incomplete

- 1978 Future Masters
- 1979 Trans-Mississippi Amateur
- 1981 Southern Amateur

== Professional wins (10) ==
=== PGA Tour wins (7) ===
Legend
Major championships (1)
Other PGA Tour (6)

No.	Date	Tournament	Winning score	Margin of victory	Runner(s)-up
1	Jul 24, 1988	Canon Sammy Davis Jr.-Greater Hartford Open	−15 (66-65-69-69=269)	Playoff	(Canada) Dave Barr, (United States) Joey Sindelar
2	Apr 28, 1991	KMart Greater Greensboro Open	−13 (71-70-70-64=275)	Playoff	(United States) Gene Sauers
3	Sep 1, 1991	Greater Milwaukee Open	−18 (63-67-70-70=270)	1 stroke	(United States) Robert Gamez
4	Jun 5, 1994	Kemper Open	−13 (65-68-69-69=271)	3 strokes	(United States) Bobby Wadkins, (United States) D. A. Weibring
5	Jan 21 1996	Bob Hope Chrysler Classic	−23 (66-68-69-67-67=337)	1 stroke	(United States) John Huston
6	May 5, 1996	Shell Houston Open	−14 (66-68-70-70=274)	Playoff	(United States) Jeff Maggert
7	Aug 11, 1996	PGA Championship	−11 (68-70-69-70=277)	Playoff	(United States) Kenny Perry

PGA Tour playoff record (4–3)

No.	Year	Tournament	Opponent(s)	Result
1	1988	Canon Sammy Davis Jr.-Greater Hartford Open	(Canada) Dave Barr, (United States) Joey Sindelar	Won with birdie on second extra hole Sindelar eliminated by par on first hole
2	1988	Gatlin Brothers-Southwest Golf Classic	(United States) Tom Purtzer	Lost to par on first extra hole
3	1991	KMart Greater Greensboro Open	(United States) Gene Sauers	Won with par on third extra hole
4	1993	Buick Southern Open	(United States) Billy Andrade, (United States) Brad Bryant, (United States) Bob Estes, (United States) John Inman	Inman won with birdie on second extra hole Andrade, Brooks and Bryant eliminated by birdie on first hole
5	1996	Shell Houston Open	(United States) Jeff Maggert	Won with birdie on first extra hole
6	1996	PGA Championship	(United States) Kenny Perry	Won with birdie on first extra hole
7	2001	U.S. Open	(South Africa) Retief Goosen	Lost 18-hole playoff; Goosen: E (70), Brooks: +2 (72)

=== Other wins (3) ===
No.	Date	Tournament	Winning score	Margin of victory	Runner(s)-up
1	Jan 3, 1993	Pebble Beach Invitational	−8 (68-68-72=208) (Note: Shortened to 54 holes due to weather.)	5 strokes	(United States) Bob May
2	Nov 24, 2002	Callaway Golf Pebble Beach Invitational (2)	−16 (70-65-68-69=272)	3 strokes	(United States) Jeff Gove
3	Nov 22, 2009	Callaway Golf Pebble Beach Invitational (3)	−12 (69-71-69-67=276)	2 strokes	(United States) Rickie Fowler, (United States) D. A. Points

== Playoff record ==
Champions Tour playoff record (0–1)

No.	Year	Tournament	Opponent	Result
1	2014	Boeing Classic	(United States) Scott Dunlap	Lost to birdie on first extra hole

== Major championships ==
=== Wins (1) ===
Year	Championship	54 holes	Winning score	Margin	Runner-up
1996	PGA Championship	2 shot deficit	−11 (68-70-69-70=277)	Playoff^{1}	(United States) Kenny Perry

^{1}Defeated Kenny Perry with a birdie on the first extra hole.

=== Results timeline ===
Tournament	1984	1985	1986	1987	1988	1989
Masters Tournament						CUT
U.S. Open	CUT		CUT	CUT	CUT	
The Open Championship						
PGA Championship					CUT	CUT

Tournament	1990	1991	1992	1993	1994	1995	1996	1997	1998	1999
Masters Tournament		T35	CUT	CUT		CUT	CUT	CUT	CUT	T38
U.S. Open	T5	T19	T44	T46	CUT		T16	CUT	57	CUT
The Open Championship		T80	T55		T20	T3	T5	CUT	T66	T62
PGA Championship	T26	CUT	T15	CUT	CUT	T31	1	CUT	T56	T16

Tournament	2000	2001	2002	2003	2004	2005	2006	2007	2008	2009
Masters Tournament	T40	T31	T24							
U.S. Open	CUT	2	CUT		CUT		CUT			
The Open Championship	CUT	CUT								
PGA Championship	CUT	CUT	CUT	CUT	CUT	CUT	CUT	CUT	CUT	CUT

Tournament	2010	2011	2012	2013	2014	2015
Masters Tournament						
U.S. Open						
The Open Championship						
PGA Championship	CUT	CUT	CUT		CUT	CUT

Win
Top 10
Did not play

CUT = missed the half way cut
"T" indicates a tie for a place.

=== Summary ===
Tournament	Wins	2nd	3rd	Top-5	Top-10	Top-25	Events	Cuts made
Masters Tournament	0	0	0	0	0	1	12	5
U.S. Open	0	1	0	2	2	4	18	7
The Open Championship	0	0	1	2	2	3	10	7
PGA Championship	1	0	0	1	1	3	27	6
Totals	1	1	1	5	5	11	67	25

- Most consecutive cuts made – 5 (1990 U.S. Open – 1991 Open Championship)
- Longest streak of top-10s – 2 (1996 Open Championship – 1996 PGA)

== Results in The Players Championship ==
Tournament	1984	1985	1986	1987	1988	1989	1990	1991	1992	1993	1994	1995	1996	1997	1998	1999	2000	2001	2002	2003	2004	2005	2006
The Players Championship	CUT	CUT		T63		CUT	T36	CUT	T9	CUT	CUT	CUT	CUT	T7	CUT	T10	T57	T65	T57	T62	CUT	CUT	CUT

Top 10
Did not play

CUT = missed the halfway cut
"T" indicates a tie for a place

== Team appearances ==
Professional

- Presidents Cup: 1996 (winners)

== See also ==
- 1983 PGA Tour Qualifying School graduates
- 1985 PGA Tour Qualifying School graduates
- 1986 PGA Tour Qualifying School graduates
- 1987 PGA Tour Qualifying School graduates
- List of men's major championships winning golfers
