= 2004 Champions Tour =

Golf tour season

2004 Champions Tour season
- Duration: January 23, 2004 – October 24, 2004
- Number of official events: 30
- Most wins: (United States) Craig Stadler (5)
- Charles Schwab Cup: (United States) Hale Irwin
- Money list: (United States) Craig Stadler
- Player of the Year: (United States) Craig Stadler
- Rookie of the Year: (Republic of Ireland) Mark McNulty

The 2004 Champions Tour was the 25th season of the Champions Tour (formerly the Senior PGA Tour), the main professional golf tour in the United States for men aged 50 and over.

== Schedule ==
The following table lists official events during the 2004 season.

Date	Tournament	Location	Purse (US$)	Winner (Note: The number in parentheses after each winner's name is the number of Champions Tour events they had won up to and including that tournament. This information is only shown for Champions Tour members.)	Notes
Jan 25	MasterCard Championship	Hawaii	1,600,000	(United States) Fuzzy Zoeller (2)	
Feb 8	Royal Caribbean Golf Classic	Florida	1,450,000	(United States) Bruce Fleisher (17)	
Feb 15	ACE Group Classic	Florida	1,600,000	(United States) Craig Stadler (4)	
Feb 22	Outback Steakhouse Pro-Am	Florida	1,600,000	(Republic of Ireland) Mark McNulty (1)	Pro-Am
Mar 7	MasterCard Classic	Mexico	2,000,000	(United States) Ed Fiori (1)	
Mar 14	SBC Classic	California	1,500,000	(United States) Gil Morgan (23)	
Mar 21	Toshiba Senior Classic	California	1,600,000	(United States) Tom Purtzer (2)	
Apr 18	Blue Angels Classic	Florida	1,500,000	(United States) Tom Jenkins (5)	
Apr 25	Liberty Mutual Legends of Golf	Georgia	3,100,000	(United States) Hale Irwin (39)	
May 2	Bruno's Memorial Classic	Alabama	1,500,000	(United States) Bruce Fleisher (18)	
May 9	FedEx Kinko's Classic	Texas	1,600,000	(United States) Larry Nelson (18)	
May 23	Allianz Championship	Iowa	1,500,000	(United States) D. A. Weibring (2)	
May 31	Senior PGA Championship	Kentucky	2,000,000	(United States) Hale Irwin (40)	Senior major championship
Jun 6	Farmers Charity Classic	Michigan	1,600,000	(United States) Jim Thorpe (8)	
Jun 13	Bayer Advantage Celebrity Pro-Am	Missouri	1,650,000	(United States) Allen Doyle (9)	Pro-Am
Jun 27	Bank of America Championship	Massachusetts	1,550,000	(United States) Craig Stadler (5)	
Jul 4	Commerce Bank Long Island Classic	New York	1,500,000	(United States) Jim Thorpe (9)	
Jul 11	Ford Senior Players Championship	Michigan	2,500,000	(England) Mark James (1)	Champions Tour major championship
Jul 25	The Senior British Open Championship	Northern Ireland	1,600,000	(United States) Pete Oakley (1)	Senior major championship
Aug 1	U.S. Senior Open	Missouri	2,600,000	(United States) Peter Jacobsen (1)	Senior major championship
Aug 8	3M Championship	Minnesota	1,750,000	(United States) Tom Kite (7)	
Aug 22	Greater Hickory Classic at Rock Barn	North Carolina	1,600,000	(United States) Doug Tewell (8)	
Aug 29	JELD-WEN Tradition	Oregon	2,300,000	(United States) Craig Stadler (6)	Champions Tour major championship
Sep 5	First Tee Open at Pebble Beach	California	2,000,000	(United States) Craig Stadler (7)	New tournament
Sep 12	Kroger Classic	Ohio	1,500,000	(United States) Bruce Summerhays (3)	
Sep 26	SAS Championship	North Carolina	1,800,000	(United States) Craig Stadler (8)	
Oct 3	Constellation Energy Classic	Maryland	1,600,000	(United States) Wayne Levi (2)	
Oct 10	Administaff Small Business Classic	Texas	1,600,000	(United States) Larry Nelson (19)	New tournament
Oct 17	SBC Championship	Texas	1,500,000	(Republic of Ireland) Mark McNulty (2)	
Oct 24	Charles Schwab Cup Championship	California	2,500,000	(Republic of Ireland) Mark McNulty (3)	Tour Championship

=== Unofficial events ===
The following events were sanctioned by the Champions Tour, but did not carry official money, nor were wins official.

Date	Tournament	Location	Purse ($)	Winners	Notes
Nov 21	UBS Cup	South Carolina	3,000,000	Team USA	Team event
Dec 5	Office Depot Father/Son Challenge	Florida	1,000,000	(United States) Larry Nelson and son Josh Nelson	Team event

== Charles Schwab Cup ==
The Charles Schwab Cup was based on tournament results during the season, calculated using a points-based system.

Position	Player	Points
1	(United States) Hale Irwin	3,427
2	(United States) Craig Stadler	3,388
3	(United States) Tom Kite	2,981
4	(United States) Peter Jacobsen	2,471
5	(Republic of Ireland) Mark McNulty	2,417

== Money list ==
The money list was based on prize money won during the season, calculated in U.S. dollars.

Position	Player	Prize money ($)
1	(United States) Craig Stadler	2,306,066
2	(United States) Hale Irwin	2,035,397
3	(United States) Tom Kite	1,831,211
4	(United States) Gil Morgan	1,606,453
5	(United States) Bruce Fleisher	1,537,571

== Awards ==
Award	Winner	Ref.
Player of the Year (Jack Nicklaus Trophy)	(United States) Craig Stadler	
Rookie of the Year	(Republic of Ireland) Mark McNulty	
Scoring leader (Byron Nelson Award)	(United States) Craig Stadler	
Comeback Player of the Year	(United States) Hubert Green	
