= 1982 Masters Tournament =

- Front cover of the 1982 Masters Guide

Tournament information
- Dates: April 8–11, 1982
- Location: Augusta, Georgia; 33.503°N 82.020°W
- Course: Augusta National Golf Club
- Organized by: Augusta National Golf Club
- Tour: PGA Tour

Statistics
- Par: 72
- Length: 6,905 yards (6,314 m)
- Field: 76 players, 47 after cut
- Cut: 154 (+10)
- Prize fund: $367,152
- Winner's share: $64,000

Champion
- (United States) Craig Stadler
- 284 (−4), playoff

Location map
- Location in the United States Location in Georgia

The 1982 Masters Tournament was the 46th Masters Tournament, held April 8–11 at Augusta National Golf Club in Augusta, Georgia. Craig Stadler won his only major championship by defeating Dan Pohl on the first hole of a sudden-death playoff.

Challenging weather conditions on Thursday and Friday led to the cut at 154 (+10), the highest since the cut was introduced in 1957 and still the highest through 2021, with the co-leaders, Stadler and Curtis Strange, at even par 144.

In the final round, Stadler shot a 33 on the front had a six-shot lead with seven holes to play. He bogeyed four of those holes, including a three-putt from twenty feet (6.1 m) on the 72nd green to force a playoff with Pohl; the playoff began and ended at the tenth hole. Pohl carded two rounds of 67 on the weekend after two rounds of 75. In the sudden-death playoff, Stadler made a routine par and won the Masters when Pohl missed his six-foot par attempt.

This was the final year that players were required to use Augusta National club caddies. The practice was previously employed at the other majors and some PGA Tour events well into the 1970s; the U.S. Open first allowed the players to use their own caddies in 1976. The policy change at Augusta National was announced by chairman Hord Hardin in November 1982.

It was the final Masters as a competitor for 1946 champion Herman Keiser, age 67, who withdrew in the first round.

== Course ==
Hole	Name	Yards	Par	Hole	Name	Yards	Par
1	Tea Olive	400	4	10	Camellia	485	4
2	Pink Dogwood	555	5	11	White Dogwood	455	4
3	Flowering Peach	360	4	12	Golden Bell	155	3
4	Flowering Crab Apple	205	3	13	Azalea	465	5
5	Magnolia	435	4	14	Chinese Fir	405	4
6	Juniper	180	3	15	Firethorn	500	5
7	Pampas	360	4	16	Redbud	170	3
8	Yellow Jasmine	535	5	17	Nandina	400	4
9	Carolina Cherry	435	4	18	Holly	405	4
Out		3,465	36	In		3,440	36
Source:				Total		6,905	72

== Field ==
1. Masters champions

Tommy Aaron, George Archer (8), Seve Ballesteros (3), Gay Brewer (8), Billy Casper, Charles Coody, Raymond Floyd (8,11,12), Doug Ford, Bob Goalby, Herman Keiser, Jack Nicklaus (2,3,4,8,9,10,12), Arnold Palmer, Gary Player (8), Sam Snead, Art Wall Jr., Tom Watson (3,8,11,12), Fuzzy Zoeller (10,11)

- Jack Burke Jr., Jimmy Demaret, Ralph Guldahl, Claude Harmon, Ben Hogan, Cary Middlecoff, Byron Nelson, Henry Picard, and Gene Sarazen did not play.

The following categories only apply to Americans

2. U.S. Open champions (last five years)

Hubert Green (8,11), Hale Irwin (11,12), Andy North

3. The Open champions (last five years)

Bill Rogers (9,11,12)

4. PGA champions (last five years)

John Mahaffey (8,11), Larry Nelson (10,12), Lanny Wadkins (8,9,11)

5. 1981 U.S. Amateur semi-finalists

Nathaniel Crosby (6, a), Bob Lewis (7, a), Brian Lindley (a), Willie Wood (a)

6. Previous two U.S. Amateur and Amateur champions

- Hal Sutton (7) forfeited his exemption by turning professional.

7. Members of the 1981 U.S. Walker Cup team

Frank Fuhrer III (a), Jim Holtgrieve (a), Jodie Mudd (a), Corey Pavin (a), Jay Sigel (a)

- Ron Commans, Joey Rassett, and Dick von Tacky forfeited their exemptions by turning professional.

8. Top 24 players and ties from the 1981 Masters Tournament

John Cook (9), Ben Crenshaw (9,12), Bob Gilder (10), Peter Jacobsen, Tom Kite (10,11,12), Bruce Lietzke (10,11,12), Johnny Miller (11,12), Gil Morgan, Jerry Pate (11,12), Calvin Peete (9), Don Pooley, Jim Simons (11), Curtis Strange

9. Top 16 players and ties from the 1981 U.S. Open

George Burns, Frank Conner, Mark Hayes, Lon Hinkle, Chi-Chi Rodríguez, John Schroeder, Jim Thorpe

- Sammy Rachels did not play

10. Top eight players and ties from 1981 PGA Championship

Keith Fergus (11), Dan Pohl

11. Winners of PGA Tour events since the previous Masters

Andy Bean, Danny Edwards, Dave Eichelberger, Ed Fiori, Jay Haas, Morris Hatalsky, Wayne Levi, Jack Renner, J. C. Snead, Craig Stadler, Ron Streck, Lee Trevino (12), Tom Weiskopf

12. Members of the U.S. 1981 Ryder Cup team

13. Foreign invitations

Isao Aoki (9,10), Dave Barr (11), David Graham (2,4,8,9), Yutaka Hagawa, Bernhard Langer, Greg Norman (8,10), Peter Oosterhuis (11), Philippe Ploujoux (6, a)

- Numbers in brackets indicate categories that the player would have qualified under had they been American.

== Round summaries ==
=== First round ===
Thursday, April 8, 1982

Place	Player	Score	To par
1	(United States) Jack Nicklaus	69	−3
T2	(United States) Jack Renner	72	E
T2	(United States) Fuzzy Zoeller	72	E
T4	(Spain) Seve Ballesteros	73	+1
T4	(United States) Gay Brewer	73	+1
T4	(Australia) David Graham	73	+1
T4	(United States) Morris Hatalsky	73	+1
T4	(Australia) Greg Norman	73	+1
T4	(England) Peter Oosterhuis	73	+1
T10	(United States) Ben Crenshaw	74	+2
T10	(United States) Raymond Floyd	74	+2
T10	(United States) Mark Hayes	74	+2
T10	(United States) Jim Holtgrieve (a)	74	+2
T10	(South Africa) Gary Player	74	+2
T10	(United States) Jerry Pate	74	+2
T10	(United States) Curtis Strange	74	+2
T10	(United States) Ron Streck	74	+2

=== Second round ===
Friday, April 9, 1982

Place	Player	Score	To par
T1	(United States) Craig Stadler	75-69=144	E
T1	(United States) Curtis Strange	74-70=144	E
3	(United States) Tom Kite	76-69=145	+1
T4	(Spain) Seve Ballesteros	73-73=146	+2
T4	(United States) Raymond Floyd	74-72=146	+2
T4	(United States) Jack Nicklaus	69-77=146	+2
T4	(United States) Tom Watson	77-69=146	+2
T8	(United States) Andy Bean	75-72=147	+3
T8	(United States) Mark Hayes	74-73=147	+3
T8	(England) Peter Oosterhuis	73-74=147	+3
T8	(South Africa) Gary Player	74-73=147	+3
T8	(United States) Jerry Pate	74-73=147	+3
T8	(United States) Jack Renner	72-75=147	+3
T8	(United States) Tom Weiskopf	75-72=147	+3

=== Third round ===
Saturday, April 10, 1982

Place	Player	Score	To par
1	(United States) Craig Stadler	75-69-67=211	−5
T2	(Spain) Seve Ballesteros	73-73-68=214	−2
T2	(United States) Jerry Pate	74-73-67=214	−2
T4	(United States) Raymond Floyd	74-72-69=215	−1
T4	(United States) Tom Weiskopf	75-72-68=215	−1
T6	(United States) Bob Gilder	79-71-66=216	E
T6	(United States) Tom Watson	77-69-70=216	E
T8	(United States) Jack Nicklaus	69-77-71=217	+1
T8	(United States) Dan Pohl	75-75-67=217	+1
T8	(United States) Curtis Strange	74-70-73=217	+1

=== Final round ===
Sunday, April 11, 1982

==== Final leaderboard ====
Champion
Silver Cup winner (low amateur)
(a) = amateur
(c) = past champion

Top 10
Place	Player	Score	To par	Money (US$)
T1	(United States) Dan Pohl	75-75-67-67=284	−4	Playoff
T1	(United States) Craig Stadler	75-69-67-73=284	−4	Playoff
T3	(Spain) Seve Ballesteros (c)	73-73-68-71=285	−3	21,000
T3	(United States) Jerry Pate	74-73-67-71=285	−3	21,000
T5	(United States) Tom Kite	76-69-73-69=287	−1	13,500
T5	(United States) Tom Watson (c)	77-69-70-71=287	−1	13,500
T7	(United States) Raymond Floyd (c)	74-72-69-74=289	+1	11,067
T7	(United States) Larry Nelson	79-71-70-69=289	+1	11,067
T7	(United States) Curtis Strange	74-70-73-72=289	+1	11,067
T10	(United States) Andy Bean	75-72-73-70=290	+2	8,550
T10	(United States) Mark Hayes	74-73-73-70=290	+2	8,550
T10	(United States) Tom Weiskopf	75-72-68-75=290	+2	8,550
T10	(United States) Fuzzy Zoeller (c)	72-76-70-72=290	+2	8,550

Leaderboard below the top 10
Place	Player	Score	To par	Money ($)
14	(United States) Bob Gilder	79-71-66-75=291	+3	6,700
T15	(Japan) Yutaka Hagawa	75-74-71-72=292	+4	5,850
T15	(United States) Jack Nicklaus (c)	69-77-71-75=292	+4	5,850
T15	(South Africa) Gary Player (c)	74-73-71-74=292	+4	5,850
T15	(United States) Jim Simons	77-74-69-72=292	+4	5,850
19	(Australia) David Graham	73-77-70-73=293	+5	5,000
T20	(United States) Peter Jacobsen	78-75-70-71=294	+6	4,300
T20	(United States) Bruce Lietzke	76-75-69-74=294	+6	4,300
T20	(United States) Jodie Mudd (a)	77-74-67-76=294	+6	0
T20	(United States) Jack Renner	72-75-76-71=294	+6	4,300
T24	(United States) Ben Crenshaw	74-80-70-71=295	+7	3,075
T24	(United States) Danny Edwards	75-74-74-72=295	+7	3,075
T24	(United States) Morris Hatalsky	73-77-75-70=295	+7	3,075
T24	(United States) Wayne Levi	77-76-72-70=295	+7	3,075
T24	(England) Peter Oosterhuis	73-74-75-73=295	+7	3,075
T24	(United States) John Schroeder	77-71-70-77=295	+7	3,075
T30	(United States) George Archer (c)	79-74-72-71=296	+8	2,475
T30	(United States) Calvin Peete	77-72-73-74=296	+8	2,475
32	(United States) Ron Streck	74-76-75-73=298	+10	2,300
T33	(United States) George Burns	75-79-71-74=299	+11	2,100
T33	(United States) Keith Fergus	76-74-72-77=299	+11	2,100
T33	(United States) Lanny Wadkins	75-78-72-74=299	+11	2,100
T36	(United States) Tommy Aaron (c)	78-72-77-73=300	+12	1,875
T36	(Australia) Greg Norman	73-75-73-79=300	+12	1,875
T38	(United States) Chi-Chi Rodríguez	78-75-73-75=301	+13	1,667
T38	(United States) Bill Rogers	77-77-77-70=301	+13	1,667
T38	(United States) Lee Trevino	75-78-75-73=301	+13	1,667
T41	(United States) Jim Holtgrieve (a)	74-76-72-80=302	+14	0
T41	(United States) Willie Wood (a)	78-75-73-76=302	+14	0
43	(United States) Hubert Green	76-72-77-78=303	+15	1,500
44	(United States) Jay Haas	76-74-76-78=304	+16	1,500
45	(United States) Gay Brewer (c)	73-80-72-80=305	+17	1,500
46	(United States) Bob Goalby (c)	81-72-78-77=308	+20	1,500
47	(United States) Arnold Palmer (c)	75-76-78-80=309	+21	1,500
CUT	(Japan) Isao Aoki	75-80=155	+11	
CUT	(West Germany) Bernhard Langer	77-78=155	+11	
CUT	(United States) Jay Sigel (a)	80-75=155	+11	
CUT	(United States) Charles Coody (c)	75-81=156	+12	
CUT	(United States) John Cook	82-74=156	+12	
CUT	(United States) Dave Eichelberger	79-77=156	+12	
CUT	(United States) Ed Fiori	76-80=156	+12	
CUT	(United States) Lon Hinkle	81-75=156	+12	
CUT	(United States) John Mahaffey	76-80=156	+12	
CUT	(United States) Gil Morgan	78-78=156	+12	
CUT	(Canada) Dave Barr	75-82=157	+13	
CUT	(United States) Art Wall Jr. (c)	75-82=157	+13	
CUT	(United States) Hale Irwin	80-78=158	+14	
CUT	(United States) Brian Lindley (a)	80-78=158	+14	
CUT	(United States) Andy North	86-72=158	+14	
CUT	(United States) Corey Pavin (a)	79-79=158	+14	
CUT	(United States) Billy Casper (c)	85-74=159	+15	
CUT	(United States) Don Pooley	79-80=159	+15	
CUT	(United States) Bob Lewis (a)	83-78=161	+17	
CUT	(United States) Johnny Miller	81-80=161	+17	
CUT	(United States) Jim Thorpe	88-74=162	+18	
CUT	(United States) Nathaniel Crosby (a)	85-78=163	+19	
CUT	(France) Philippe Ploujoux (a)	81-82=163	+19	
CUT	(United States) Frank Fuhrer III (a)	86-79=165	+21	
CUT	(United States) Doug Ford (c)	86-83=169	+25	
CUT	(United States) Frank Conner	89-82=171	+27	
WD	(United States) Sam Snead (c)	82	+10	
WD	(United States) Herman Keiser (c)			
DQ	(United States) J. C. Snead	78-75=153	+9	

==== Scorecard ====
Hole	1	2	3	4	5	6	7	8	9	10	11	12	13	14	15	16	17	18
Par	4	5	4	3	4	3	4	5	4	4	4	3	5	4	5	3	4	4
(United States) Stadler	−5	−6	−6	−6	−6	−7	−8	−8	−8	−8	−8	−7	−7	−6	−6	−5	−5	−4
(United States) Pohl	E	−1	−1	−1	−1	−1	−1	−1	−2	−2	−2	−3	−4	−3	−3	−4	−4	−4
(Spain) Ballesteros	−1	−2	−2	−2	−2	−2	−2	−2	−2	−1	−1	E	E	E	−1	−1	−2	−3
(United States) Pate	−1	−1	−1	E	E	E	E	E	E	−1	−1	−1	−1	−1	−2	−3	−3	−3

Cumulative tournament scores, relative to par

=== Playoff ===
Place	Player	Score	To par	Money ($)
1	(United States) Craig Stadler	4	E	64,000
2	(United States) Dan Pohl	x		39,000

- Sudden-death playoff began and ended on hole #10, when Stadler parred to win.
