= Mark McCormack's world golf rankings =

The McCormack rankings were unofficial world golf rankings published in Mark McCormack's World of Professional Golf Annual from 1968 to 1985, and were a forerunner of the current Official World Golf Ranking. Unlike their replacement they were not used to select fields for tournaments, and served no real purpose other than as a talking point.

The rankings were the first that had been compiled that took account of results from all the world's major professional tours, from the United States, Europe, Japan, Asia, Africa, and Australia. The system rewarded players for their finishing places in tournaments played over a three-year period, with more points awarded for more recent achievements, and more points awarded for major championships and tour events with strong fields than for those in other tournaments. They also reflected McCormack's philosophy that victory should be strongly rewarded, wherever in the world it took place – winners of tournaments received additional bonus points, and only high finishers in tournaments received any recognition - for example just the top ten places received ranking points in major championships.

The first player to lead the rankings was McCormack's client Jack Nicklaus (although Nicklaus left his business arrangement with McCormack in 1970), and he continued to lead them for almost all of the 1970s. He would be succeeded as number one in 1978 by Tom Watson, who in turn was succeeded in 1983 by Seve Ballesteros. Had McCormack's rankings of the time been based on results over just the most recent two years, like their modern counterpart, Gary Player would have been number one in 1969 instead of Nicklaus, Raymond Floyd number one at the end of 1982 instead of Tom Watson (despite the latter's two major victories that summer) and Bernhard Langer would have been number one at the end of 1985 instead of Ballesteros. All the other year-end number ones, however, would have remained as they were on the three-year system.

The first ranking list, taking account of results from January 1966 to December 1968, included five American players in the top ten (Jack Nicklaus, Arnold Palmer, Billy Casper, Julius Boros and Frank Beard) and five non-Americans (Gary Player, Bob Charles, Neil Coles, Peter Thomson and Kel Nagle). By 1976, the ranking list was almost totally dominated by American players – Nicklaus, Hale Irwin and Johnny Miller were the world's top three – and only two of the top ten (Gary Player and Graham Marsh) were non-Americans. The last ranking lists, published in the mid-1980s, reflected the shift in dominance back away from American golfers by that time – in 1984, five of the top ten were non-American, and in the last list published in December 1985, the top three players in the world – Seve Ballesteros, Bernhard Langer and Greg Norman – were all non-American.

In the years the rankings were published, the highest position attained by a British player was sixth – by Tony Jacklin in 1972, and Nick Faldo in 1984. The rankings were notable for the high positions reached by the leading Japanese players of the day, with Masashi Ozaki, Isao Aoki and Tsuneyuki Nakajima all achieving top-ten rankings at various times.

In 1986 McCormack's system was taken up by The Royal and Ancient Golf Club of St Andrews and became the Sony Rankings. At first the Sony Rankings were only used by the Royal and Ancient to exempt players from qualifying for The Open Championship (in particular to allow invititations to be sent to the leading American players, some of whom were reluctant to travel to have to pre-qualify), but in 1997 they were endorsed by all of the principal men's professional tours (five at that time) and renamed the Official World Golf Ranking. Over the years the Official rankings have come to be used to select players for an increasing number of important tournaments, including the major championships, the World Golf Championships and the European Ryder Cup side.

== Ranking leaders ==
The following table lists the top five players in the rankings each year.

Year	No. 1	No. 2	No. 3	No. 4	No. 5
1968	Jack Nicklaus	Arnold Palmer	Billy Casper	Gary Player	Bob Charles
1969	Jack Nicklaus	Gary Player	Billy Casper	Arnold Palmer	Bob Charles
1970	Jack Nicklaus	Gary Player	Billy Casper	Lee Trevino	Bob Charles
1971	Jack Nicklaus	Lee Trevino	Gary Player	Arnold Palmer	Billy Casper
1972	Jack Nicklaus	Gary Player	Lee Trevino	Bruce Crampton	Arnold Palmer
1973	Jack Nicklaus	Tom Weiskopf	Lee Trevino	Gary Player	Bruce Crampton
1974	Jack Nicklaus	Johnny Miller	Gary Player	Tom Weiskopf	Lee Trevino
1975	Jack Nicklaus	Johnny Miller	Tom Weiskopf	Hale Irwin	Gary Player
1976	Jack Nicklaus	Hale Irwin	Johnny Miller	Gary Player	Hubert Green
1977	Jack Nicklaus	Tom Watson	Hubert Green	Hale Irwin	Ben Crenshaw
1978	Tom Watson	Jack Nicklaus	Hale Irwin	Hubert Green	Gary Player
1979	Tom Watson	Jack Nicklaus	Hale Irwin	Lee Trevino	Gary Player
1980	Tom Watson	Lee Trevino	Isao Aoki	Ben Crenshaw	Jack Nicklaus
1981	Tom Watson	Bill Rogers	Isao Aoki	Jerry Pate	Lee Trevino
1982	Tom Watson	Raymond Floyd	Seve Ballesteros	Tom Kite	Craig Stadler
1983	Seve Ballesteros	Tom Watson	Raymond Floyd	Greg Norman	Tom Kite
1984	Seve Ballesteros	Tom Watson	Greg Norman	Lanny Wadkins	Bernhard Langer
1985	Seve Ballesteros	Bernhard Langer	Greg Norman	Tom Watson	Tsuneyuki Nakajima

== Ranking summary ==
Player	Country	1st	2nd	3rd	4th	5th	Top-5
Jack Nicklaus	United States	10	2			1	13
Tom Watson	United States	5	3		1		9
Seve Ballesteros	Spain	3		1			4
Gary Player	South Africa		3	2	3	3	11
Lee Trevino	United States		2	2	2	2	8
Johnny Miller	United States		2	1			3
Hale Irwin	United States		1	2	2		5
Tom Weiskopf	United States		1	1	1		3
Raymond Floyd	United States		1	1			2
Arnold Palmer	United States		1		2	1	4
Bernhard Langer	West Germany		1			1	2
Bill Rogers	United States		1				1
Billy Casper	United States			3		1	4
Greg Norman	Australia			2	1		3
Isao Aoki	Japan			2			2
Hubert Green	United States			1	1	1	3
Ben Crenshaw	United States				1	1	2
Bruce Crampton	Australia				1	1	2
Tom Kite	United States				1	1	2
Jerry Pate	United States				1		1
Lanny Wadkins	United States				1		1
Bob Charles	New Zealand					3	3
Tsuneyuki Nakajima	Japan					1	1
Craig Stadler	United States					1	1

== Single-year points leaders ==
For the years that the rankings were compiled, the following golfers earned most points during each single calendar year:

- 1966 Jack Nicklaus
- 1967 Arnold Palmer
- 1968 Jack Nicklaus
- 1969 Gary Player
- 1970 Jack Nicklaus
- 1971 Jack Nicklaus
- 1972 Jack Nicklaus
- 1973 Tom Weiskopf
- 1974 Gary Player
- 1975 Jack Nicklaus
- 1976 Hale Irwin
- 1977 Tom Watson
- 1978 Tom Watson
- 1979 Tom Watson
- 1980 Tom Watson
- 1981 Bill Rogers
- 1982 Craig Stadler
- 1983 Seve Ballesteros
- 1984 Seve Ballesteros
- 1985 Bernhard Langer
