= Yutaka Hagawa =

Japanese golfer

Yutaka Hagawa 羽川 豊
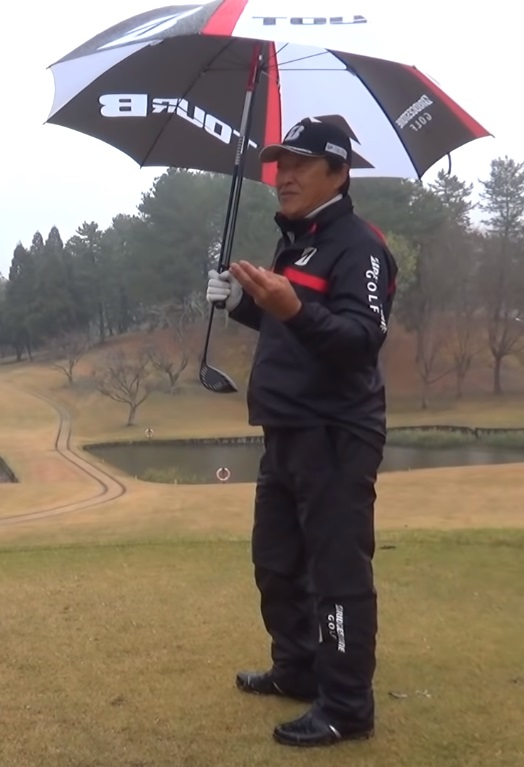

Personal information
- Nationality: Japan
- Born: 8 December 1957 (age 68) Tochigi Prefecture, Japan
- Height: 1.80 m (5 ft 11 in)
- Weight: 76 kg (168 lb; 12.0 st)

Career
- Sport: Golf
- College: Senshu University
- Status: Professional
- Current tour: Japan PGA Senior Tour
- Former tour: Japan Golf Tour
- Professional wins: 9

Number of wins by tour
- Japan Golf Tour: 5
- Other: 4

Best results in major championships
- Masters Tournament: T15: 1982
- PGA Championship: DNP
- U.S. Open: DNP
- The Open Championship: CUT: 1990

Yutaka Hagawa (羽川 豊, Hagawa Yutaka; born 8 December 1957) is a Japanese professional golfer.

== Career ==
Hagawa played on the Japan Golf Tour, winning five times. He was invited to the Masters Tournament twice, finishing T-15 in his first performance in 1982.

Hagawa is a left-handed golfer.

== Professional wins (9) ==
=== PGA of Japan Tour wins (5) ===
No.	Date	Tournament	Winning score	Margin of victory	Runner(s)-up
1	1 Nov 1981	Japan Open Golf Championship	E (74-69-69-68=280)	1 stroke	(Japan) Kenji Mori, (Japan) Tsuneyuki Nakajima
2	6 Dec 1981	Golf Nippon Series	−9 (70-65=135) (Note: Shortened to 36 holes due to weather.)	Playoff	(Japan) Isao Aoki
3	5 Jun 1983	Tohoku Classic	−11 (70-69-67-71=277)	7 strokes	(Japan) Teruo Sugihara
4	17 Mar 1991	Imperial Open	−6 (70-72-66-74=282)	1 stroke	(Japan) Naomichi Ozaki
5	24 Mar 1991	Dydo Shizuoka Open	−10 (70-72-69-67=278)	1 stroke	(Japan) Noboru Sugai

PGA of Japan Tour playoff record (1–2)

No.	Year	Tournament	Opponent	Result
1	1981	Kanto Pro Championship	(Japan) Seiichi Kanai	Lost to par on first extra hole
2	1981	Golf Nippon Series	(Japan) Isao Aoki	Won with birdie on first extra hole
3	1982	Mizuno Tournament	(Japan) Teruo Sugihara	Lost to birdie on second extra hole

=== Other wins (1) ===
- 1995 Kanto Open

=== Japan PGA Senior Tour wins (3) ===
- 2011 Total Energy Cup PGA Philanthropy Senior Tournament
- 2013 Fancl Classic
- 2014 Fancl Classic
