= 1975 Piccadilly World Match Play Championship =

Coordinates: 51°23′48″N 0°35′45″W

Tournament information
- Dates: 9–11 October 1975
- Location: Virginia Water, Surrey, England
- Course(s): West Course, Wentworth
- Format: Match play – 36 holes

Statistics
- Par: 73
- Length: 6,969 yards (6,372 m)
- Field: 8 players
- Prize fund: £30,000
- Winner's share: £10,000

Champion
- (United States) Hale Irwin
- def. Al Geiberger 4 & 2

The 1975 Piccadilly World Match Play Championship was the 12th World Match Play Championship. It was played from Thursday 9 to Saturday 11 October on the West Course at Wentworth. Eight players competed in a straight knock-out competition, with each match contested over 36 holes. The champion received £10,000 out of a total prize fund of £30,000. In the final, defending champion Hale Irwin beat Al Geiberger 4 & 2.

== Course ==
Hole	1	2	3	4	5	6	7	8	9	Out	10	11	12	13	14	15	16	17	18	In	Total
Yards	471	155	452	501	191	344	399	398	460	3,371	186	376	483	441	179	480	380	571	502	3,598	6,969
Par	4	3	4	5	3	4	4	4	4	35	3	4	5	4	3	5	4	5	5	38	73

== Scores ==
Quarter-finals; 9 October
(United States) Hale Irwin	9 & 8
(England) Peter Oosterhuis
(Australia) Jack Newton	1 up
(South Africa) Bobby Cole
(United States) John Mahaffey
(United States) Al Geiberger	37 h
(United States) Tom Watson	2 up
(Australia) Graham Marsh

Semi-finals; 10 October
(United States) Hale Irwin	4 & 3
(Australia) Jack Newton
(United States) Al Geiberger	2 & 1
(United States) Tom Watson

Final; 11 October
(United States) Hale Irwin	4 & 2
(United States) Al Geiberger

== Prize money ==
The winner received £10,000, the runner-up £5,000, the losing semi-finalists £3,500 and the first round losers £2,000, making a total prize fund of £30,000.
