= 1979 U.S. Open (golf) =

Coordinates: 41.652°N 83.651°W

Tournament information
- Dates: June 14–17, 1979
- Location: Toledo, Ohio
- Course: Inverness Club
- Organized by: USGA
- Tour: PGA Tour

Statistics
- Par: 71
- Length: 6,982 yards (6,384 m)
- Field: 153 players, 63 after cut
- Cut: 151 (+9)
- Winner's share: $50,000

Champion
- (United States) Hale Irwin
- 284 (E)

Location in the United States

The 1979 U.S. Open was the 79th U.S. Open, held June 14–17, at Inverness Club in Toledo, Ohio. Hale Irwin won his second U.S. Open title, two strokes ahead of former champions Jerry Pate and Gary Player.

== Summary ==
For the first time, the USGA granted exemptions to Order of Merit champions of the top five international tours. The tours granted exemptions were: Southern African Tour, European Tour, PGA Tour of Australia, Asia Golf Circuit, and Japan Golf Tour.

Hale Irwin, the 1974 champion, held a three-stroke lead over Tom Weiskopf going to the final round. Irwin did not play particularly well, recording bogeys at 11, 14, and 18, and a double-bogey at 17. His final-round 75 tied the post-World War II tournament record for highest final round score by the champion. Jerry Pate, the 1976 champion, began the day five behind Irwin and carded a 72 to finish two back. 1965 champion Gary Player, nine behind at the start of the round, fired a 68 to tie Pate for 2nd. Weiskopf struggled on his way to a 76 and finished in 4th.

During the first round a mini controversy sprung up when Lon Hinkle purposefully hit his tee shot on the par 5 8th hole on to the fairway of hole 17, dramatically shortening the hole by cutting off the dogleg. Hinkle reached the green in two with an iron, two putted for birdie and shared the first-round lead. USGA officials were not pleased by Hinkle's ingenuity and the following morning planted a tree off the side of the 8th tee so that players would not be able to take Hinkle's shortcut again.

Player's runner-up finish was his final top-10 in a U.S. Open. Fred Couples, age 19, played in his first major championship and was low amateur.

This was the fourth U.S. Open at Inverness, which hosted in 1920, 1931, and 1957. It later hosted the PGA Championship in 1986 and 1993.

== Course layout ==
Hole	1	2	3	4	5	6	7	8	9	Out	10	11	12	13	14	15	16	17	18	In	Total
Yards	398	385	185	446	401	220	452	528	420	3,455	363	378	167	523	448	458	405	431	354	3,527	6,982
Par	4	4	3	4	4	3	4	5	4	35	4	4	3	5	4	4	4	4	4	36	71

Lengths of the course for previous major championships:

- 6,919 yards (6,327 m), par 71 - 1957 U.S. Open
- 6,529 yards (5,970 m), par 71 - 1931 U.S. Open
- 6,569 yards (6,007 m), par 71 - 1920 U.S. Open

== Round summaries ==
=== First round ===
Thursday, June 14, 1979

Place	Player	Score	To par
T1	(United States) Andy Bean	70	−1
T1	(United States) Keith Fergus	70	−1
T1	(United States) Lou Graham	70	−1
T1	(United States) Lon Hinkle	70	−1
T1	(United States) Tom Purtzer	70	−1
T6	(United States) Jim Colbert	71	E
T6	(United States) John Cook (a)	71	E
T6	(United States) Larry Nelson	71	E
T6	(United States) Jerry Pate	71	E
T6	(United States) Dana Quigley	71	E
T6	(United States) Bill Rogers	71	E
T6	(United States) Tom Weiskopf	71	E

=== Second round ===
Friday, June 15, 1979

Place	Player	Score	To par
T1	(United States) Larry Nelson	71-68=139	−3
T1	(United States) Tom Purtzer	70-69=139	−3
3	(United States) Hale Irwin	74-68=142	E
4	(United States) Bill Rogers	71-72=143	+1
T5	(United States) Jim Colbert	71-74=145	+3
T5	(United States) Lou Graham	70-75=145	+3
T5	(United States) Jerry Pate	71-74=145	+3
T5	(United States) Ed Sneed	72-73=145	+3
T5	(United States) Dave Stockton	75-70=145	+3
T5	(United States) Tom Weiskopf	71-74=145	+3

Amateurs: Couples (+8), Rassett (+8), Cook (+9), Britton (+11), Clampett (+11), Ogrin (+13), McGough (+16), Gusmus (+18), Inskeep (+21), Kemp (+21), Peddy (+21), Rentz (+21), Clements (+22), Nordling (+24), Taylor (+26), Marrello (WD).

=== Third round ===
Saturday, June 16, 1979

Place	Player	Score	To par
1	(United States) Hale Irwin	74-68-67=209	−4
2	(United States) Tom Weiskopf	71-74-67=212	−1
T3	(United States) Jerry Pate	71-74-69=214	+1
T3	(United States) Tom Purtzer	70-69-75=214	+1
T5	(United States) Lee Elder	74-72-69=215	+2
T5	(United States) Larry Nelson	71-68-76=215	+2
T7	(United States) Bob Gilder	77-70-69=216	+3
T7	(Australia) David Graham	73-73-70=216	+3
T7	(United States) Bill Rogers	71-72-73=216	+3
T10	(United States) Andy Bean	70-76-71=217	+4
T10	(United States) Al Geiberger	74-74-69=217	+4
T10	(United States) Bob E. Smith	77-71-69=217	+4
T10	(United States) Bobby Walzel	74-72-71=217	+4

=== Final round ===
Sunday, June 17, 1979

Place	Player	Score	To par	Money ($)
1	(United States) Hale Irwin	74-68-67-75=284	E	50,000
T2	(United States) Jerry Pate	71-74-69-72=286	+2	22,250
T2	(South Africa) Gary Player	73-73-72-68=286	+2	22,250
T4	(United States) Larry Nelson	71-68-76-73=288	+4	13,733
T4	(United States) Bill Rogers	71-72-73-72=288	+4	13,733
T4	(United States) Tom Weiskopf	71-74-67-76=288	+4	13,733
7	(Australia) David Graham	73-73-70-73=289	+5	10,000
8	(United States) Tom Purtzer	70-69-75-76=290	+6	9,000
T9	(United States) Keith Fergus	70-77-72-72=291	+7	7,500
T9	(United States) Jack Nicklaus	74-77-72-68=291	+7	7,500

Amateurs: Fred Couples (+18), John Cook (+20), Joey Rassett (+20).

=== Scorecard ===
Final round

Hole	1	2	3	4	5	6	7	8	9	10	11	12	13	14	15	16	17	18
Par	4	4	3	4	4	3	4	5	4	4	4	3	5	4	4	4	4	4
(United States) Irwin	−4	−5	−4	−4	−3	−3	−3	−4	−4	−4	−3	−4	−4	−3	−3	−3	−1	E
(United States) Pate	+1	E	−1	−1	+1	+1	+1	+1	+3	+2	+2	+2	+3	+2	+2	+2	+3	+2
(South Africa) Player	+6	+6	+6	+6	+6	+5	+5	+4	+4	+4	+4	+4	+3	+4	+4	+4	+3	+2

Cumulative tournament scores, relative to par

Birdie	Bogey	Double bogey
