= Boone Valley Golf Club =

Private golf club in Missouri, USA

- Interactive map of Boone Valley Golf Club
- 38.6280°N 90.8752°W

Club information
- Location: 1319 Schluersburg Road; Augusta, Missouri, United States
- Established: 1988
- Type: Private
- Tota holes: 18
- Tournaments: U.S. Girls' Junior Golf Championship (2017); U.S. Junior Amateur Golf Championship (2007); Enterprise Rent-A-Car Match Play Championship (2001); Boone Valley Classic (1996–2000)
- Website: boonevalley.org
- Designed by: Pete, Alice, & PB Dye
- Par: 71
- Length: 6,944 yd (6,350 m)
- Course rating: 74.3
- Slope rating: 145

Boone Valley Golf Club is a private golf club in Augusta, Missouri.

== Details ==
The 18-hole club was founded by Robert Ross and was built by golf course architect, PB Dye, son of celebrated golf course architect Pete Dye. In May, 1991, The Crawford Group headed by Jack C. Taylor, acquired Boone Valley Golf Club. The 440 acre property is located 3 miles from the Daniel Boone Home in the Femme Osage Valley.

== PGA Tour Champions host ==
From 1996 to 2000, Boone Valley Golf Club hosted the Boone Valley Classic, a Senior PGA Tour (now known as the PGA Tour Champions) event. In 2001, Boone Valley hosted the Enterprise Rent-A-Car Match Play Championship also on the Senior PGA Tour.

== USGA host ==
In 2007, Boone Valley hosted the U.S. Junior Amateur Golf Championship and in 2017 hosted the United States Girls' Junior Golf Championship. On October 5, 2017 the USGA announced that the US Girls' Junior Champion from the previous year be exempt from local and sectional qualifying for the US Women's Open (and US Open for the US Junior Champion) effective with the 2018 championship.

== Scorecard ==
Boone Valley Golf Club
Tee	Rating/Slope	1	2	3	4	5	6	7	8	9	Out	10	11	12	13	14	15	16	17	18	In	Total
Augusta	74.3 / 145	419	410	211	467	442	553	344	143	561	3550	361	426	183	477	506	337	224	479	401	3394	6944
Taylor	73.1 / 142	419	405	183	454	425	505	344	143	561	3439	361	426	183	425	476	337	224	437	401	3270	6709
Boone Valley	72.6 / 142	388	375	183	444	414	505	327	128	552	3315	361	426	170	425	476	337	204	432	373	3204	6519
Blue	70.3 / 130	341	349	167	422	385	488	304	115	540	3111	330	362	152	386	436	314	190	400	337	2907	6018
White	67.1 / 123	303	287	149	422	310	450	265	115	517	2818	291	338	101	338	419	281	175	343	280	2566	5384
Green	70.6 / 125	303	287	117	302	310	440	255	88	470	2572	268	338	83	338	362	241	175	343	280	2428	5000
Par	Men's	4	4	3	4	4	5	4	3	5	36	4	4	3	4	5	4	3	4	4	35	71
SI	Men's	7	5	11	1	3	15	13	17	9		12	4	18	2	14	16	8	6	10
White	72.0 / 127	303	287	149	422	310	450	265	115	517	2818	291	338	101	338	419	281	175	343	280	2566	5384
Green	70.5 / 125	303	287	117	302	310	440	255	88	470	2572	268	338	83	338	362	241	175	343	280	2428	5000
Par	Women's	4	4	3	4	4	5	4	3	5	36	4	4	3	4	5	4	3	4	4	35	71
SI	Women's	3	11	13	5	1	7	15	17	9		10	4	18	2	8	14	16	12	6
