= Boone Valley Classic =

Senior PGA Tour golf tournament (1996–2001)

The Boone Valley Classic was a golf tournament on the Senior PGA Tour from 1996 to 2001. It was last played in Augusta, Missouri at the Boone Valley Golf Club. The event was played at stroke play except that the last event, called the Enterprise Rent-A-Car Match Play Championship, was contested at both stroke play and match play. This event featured two days of stroke play, after which the field was cut to the top 16 players. These 16 competed at match play in morning and afternoon matches the last two days of the tournament.

The purse for the 2001 tournament was US$2,000,000, with $300,000 going to the winner.

== Winners ==
Enterprise Rent-A-Car Match Play Championship

- 2001 Leonard Thompson

Boone Valley Classic

- 2000 Larry Nelson
- 1999 Hale Irwin
- 1998 Larry Nelson
- 1997 Hale Irwin
- 1996 Gibby Gilbert
