= 1974 Piccadilly World Match Play Championship =

Coordinates: 51°23′48″N 0°35′45″W

Tournament information
- Dates: 10–12 October 1974
- Location: Virginia Water, Surrey, England
- Course(s): West Course, Wentworth
- Format: Match play – 36 holes

Statistics
- Par: 73
- Length: 6,969 yards (6,372 m)
- Field: 8 players
- Prize fund: £30,000
- Winner's share: £10,000

Champion
- (United States) Hale Irwin
- def. Gary Player 3 & 1

The 1974 Piccadilly World Match Play Championship was the 11th World Match Play Championship. It was played from Thursday 10 to Saturday 12 October on the West Course at Wentworth. Eight players competed in a straight knock-out competition, with each match contested over 36 holes. The champion received £10,000 out of a total prize fund of £30,000. In the final, Hale Irwin beat defending champion Gary Player 3 & 1. It was Player's first defeat in a final after five previous victories.

== Course ==
Hole	1	2	3	4	5	6	7	8	9	Out	10	11	12	13	14	15	16	17	18	In	Total
Yards	471	155	452	501	191	344	399	398	460	3,371	186	376	483	441	179	480	380	571	502	3,598	6,969
Par	4	3	4	5	3	4	4	4	4	35	3	4	5	4	3	5	4	5	5	38	73

== Scores ==
Quarter-finals; 10 October
(South Africa) Gary Player	4 & 3
(United States) Ben Crenshaw
(Australia) Graham Marsh
(United States) Jerry Heard	2 up
(England) Tony Jacklin	7 & 6
(England) Peter Oosterhuis
(United States) Hale Irwin	4 & 2
(New Zealand) Bob Charles

Semi-finals; 11 October
(South Africa) Gary Player	5 & 4
(United States) Jerry Heard
(England) Tony Jacklin
(United States) Hale Irwin	5 & 4

Final; 12 October
(South Africa) Gary Player
(United States) Hale Irwin	3 & 1

== Prize money ==
The winner received £10,000, the runner-up £5,000, the losing semi-finalists £3,500 and the first round losers £2,000, making a total prize fund of £30,000.
