= Official World Golf Ranking =

Rates male professional golfers

The Official World Golf Ranking is a system for rating the performance level of professional golfers. It was started in 1986. The rankings are based on a player's position in individual tournaments (i.e. not pairs or team events) over a "rolling" two-year period. New rankings are calculated each week. During 2018, nearly 400 tournaments on 20 tours were covered by the ranking system. All players competing in these tournaments are included in the rankings. In 2026, 25 tours factored into the world rankings. As well as being of general interest, the rankings have an additional importance, in that they are used as one of the qualifying criteria for entry into a number of leading tournaments.

The chair of the OWGR is former world number twelve and 2008 Masters Tournament champion Trevor Immelman.

== History ==
The initiative for the creation of the Official World Golf Ranking came from the Championship Committee of the Royal and Ancient Golf Club of St Andrews, which found in the 1980s that its system of issuing invitations to The Open Championship on a tour by tour basis was omitting an increasing number of top players because more of them were dividing their time between tours, and from preeminent sports agent Mark McCormack, who was the first chairman of the International Advisory Committee which oversees the rankings. The system used to calculate the rankings was developed from McCormack's World Golf Rankings, which were published in his World of Professional Golf Annual from 1968 to 1985, although these were purely unofficial and not used for any wider purpose (such as inviting players to major tournaments).

The first ranking list was published prior to the 1986 Masters Tournament. The top six ranked golfers were: Bernhard Langer, Seve Ballesteros, Sandy Lyle, Tom Watson, Mark O'Meara and Greg Norman. Thus, the top three were all European, but there were 31 Americans in the top 50 (compared with 17 at the end of 2010).

The method of calculation of the rankings has changed considerably over the years. Initially, the rankings were calculated over a three-year period, with the current year's points multiplied by four (three in 1986), the previous year's points by two and the third year's points by one. Rankings were based on the total points and points awarded were restricted to integer values. All tournaments recognised by the world's professional tours, and some leading invitational events, were graded into categories ranging from major championship (whose winners would receive 50 points) to "other tournaments" (whose winners would receive a minimum of 8). In all events, other finishers received points on a diminishing scale that began with runners-up receiving 60% of the winners' points, and the number of players in the field receiving points would be the same as the points awarded to the winner. In a major, for example, all players finishing 30th to 40th would receive 2 points, and all players finishing 50th or higher, 1 point.

Beginning in April 1989, the rankings were changed to be based on the average points per event played instead of simply total points earned, subject to a minimum divisor of 60 (20 events per year). This was in order to more accurately reflect the status of some (particularly older) players, who played in far fewer events than their younger contemporaries but demonstrated in major championships that their ranking was artificially low. Tom Watson, for example, finished in the top 15 of eight major championships between 1987 and 1989, yet had a "total points" ranking of just 40th; his ranking became a more realistic 20th when based on "average points". A new system for determining the "weight" of each tournament was also introduced, based on the strength of the tournament's field in terms of their pre-tournament world rankings. Major championships were guaranteed to remain at 50 points for the winners, and all other events could attain a maximum of 40 points for the winner if all of the world's top 100 were present. In practice most PGA Tour events awarded around 25 points to the winner, European Tour events around 18 and JPGA Tour events around 12.

In 1996, the three-year period was reduced to two years, with the current year now counting double and the minimum number of events reduced from 60 to 40. Points were extended to more of the field, beginning in 2000, and were no longer restricted to integer values. Beginning in September 2001, the tapering system was changed so that instead of the points for each result being doubled if they occurred in the most recent 12 months, one eighth of the initial "multiplied up" value was deducted every 13 weeks. This change effectively meant that players could now be more simply described as being awarded 100 points (not 50) for winning a major. Beginning in 2007, the system holds the points from each event at full value for 13 weeks and then reduces them in equal weekly increments over the remainder of the two-year period.

In 2010, a maximum number of tournaments was introduced as well as the minimum of 40. The maximum number was initially set to 60 from January 2010 and was reduced by 2 every six months until it reached 52 in January 2012. This means that since 2012 only the player's 52 most recent tournaments (within the two-year period) are used to calculate his ranking average.

At first only the Championship Committee of the Royal and Ancient used the rankings for official purposes, but the PGA Tour recognized them in 1990, and in 1997 during the Open Championship, all five of the then principal men's golf tours and the four major championships endorsed the ranking. The rankings, which had previously been called the Sony Ranking, were renamed the Official World Golf Ranking at that time.

== Organization ==
Since 2004 the rankings have been produced by a company called "Official World Golf Ranking" which took over the ranking system from IMG. The company is a company limited by guarantee incorporated in the United Kingdom with its registered office at the European Tour Building at Wentworth. The company has seven members: The PGA of America, the International Federation of PGA Tours, the USGA, the PGA Tour, Augusta National, the R&A and the PGA European Tour, who each contribute to the running of the company; £50,000 each in 2020. There is a chairman and seven directors, one appointed by each member, who make up the Governing board. There is also a Technical committee. One of the objects of the company is "to devise, maintain, review, update, administer and promote the recognition of a system that fairly ranks the relative performances of male professional golfers participating in the leading golf tournaments throughout the world, taking into account all relevant factors including, amongst other matters, the date of the tournament, the prestige of the tournament, the standard of the other participants and the value of the tournament prize fund."

== Tours included in the rankings ==
The ranking system is endorsed by the four major championships and six major professional tours, five of which are charter members of the International Federation of PGA Tours:

- PGA Tour
- European Tour (currently titled as the DP World Tour for sponsorship reasons)
- Asian Tour (from 2000; not a charter member of the Federation)
- PGA Tour of Australasia
- Japan Golf Tour
- Sunshine Tour

Points are also awarded for high finishes on other tours:

- Korn Ferry Tour, the official developmental tour for the PGA Tour
- Challenge Tour, the official developmental tour for the European Tour
- PGA Tour Americas, a newly combined tertiary development tour as of 2024 that is a merger of:
  - PGA Tour Canada, originally the Canadian Professional Golf Tour when it became a full member of the Federation in 2009 and two one-off tours caused by 2020-21 pandemic restrictions:
    - LocaliQ Series, in 2020, replaced both the PGA Tour Canada and Latinoamérica.
    - Forme Tour, in 2021, was for PGA Tour Canada members unable to travel because of geographic restrictions.
  - PGA Tour Latinoamérica, originally Tour de las Américas when it became a full member in 2011
- Korean Tour, from 2011
- Asian Development Tour, the official developmental tour for the Asian Tour, from 2013
- Alps Tour, from July 2015
- Nordic Golf League, from July 2015
- Pro Golf Tour, from July 2015
- MENA Golf Tour, from April 2016
- Big Easy Tour, from 2018
- China Tour, from 2018
- All Thailand Golf Tour, from 2019
- Professional Golf Tour of India, from 2019
- Japan Challenge Tour (known as the Abema TV Tour for sponsorship reasons), from 2019
- Gira de Golf Profesional Mexicana, from 2023
- Clutch Pro Tour, added April 2024
- Tartan Pro Tour, added May 2024
- Taiwan PGA Tour, added January 2025
- LIV Golf, added February 2026

Starting in 2012, some events received points that had not previously received any. These were the Sunshine Tour "Winter Series" and the PGA Tour of Australasia "State Based and Regional Tournaments".

Previous tours:

- Asia Golf Circuit, from 1986 until 1997.
- OneAsia Tour, added in 2009 but was dropped in 2018.
- PGA EuroPro Tour, from July 2015 through 2022
- PGA Tour China, from 2014 through 2019

== Calculation of the rankings ==
Simply put, a golfer's World Ranking is obtained by dividing their points total by the number of events they have played, which gives their average. Players are then ranked according to their average, highest first.

=== Event ranking ===
The first stage in the calculation is the ranking of each event. For most events the ranking depends on the current world rankings of the participating golfers and the participation of the leading golfers from the "home tour".

A "world rating value" is calculated. Any golfer currently ranked in the world top 200 is given a rating value. The world No. 1 is allocated 45, the No. 2 is allocated 37, the No. 3 is allocated 32, down to those ranked between 101 and 200 who are allocated a rating value of 1 each. The maximum possible world rating value is 925 but this would only happen if all the top 200 golfers were playing.

A "home tour rating value" is calculated. The leading 30 golfers from the previous year's "home tour" are given rating values. Most tours use earnings lists for their top 30, but the PGA Tour currently uses the FedEx points list calculated after the playoffs. Major championships and WGC events use the current world top 30 list. The home tour No. 1 is allocated 8 down to those from 16 to 30 who are allocated a rating value of 1 each. The maximum home tour rating value is 75 if all the top 30 players from the home tour are competing. The total home tour rating value is limited to 75% of the world rating value.

The world rating value and home tour rating value are added together to give a "Strength of Field" value. This is then converted into an event ranking using a table. As examples, a strength of field value of 10 converts to an event ranking of 8, a strength of field value of 100 converts to an event ranking of 24, while a strength of field value of 500 converts to an event ranking of 62.

Major championships have a fixed event ranking of 100 points. For each tour, there is a minimum ranking for each event. In addition, some tours have a "flagship event" that is guaranteed a higher ranking.

Tour	Minimum points	Flagship event	Minimum points
PGA Tour	24	The Players Championship	80
European Tour	24	BMW PGA Championship	64
Japan Golf Tour	16	Japan Open Golf Championship	32
PGA Tour of Australasia	16 (6)	Australian Open	32
Sunshine Tour	14 (6/4)	Alfred Dunhill Championship (Note: Formerly the South African Open.)	32
Asian Tour	14	Indonesian Masters (Note: Formerly the Thailand Golf Championship.)	20
Korn Ferry Tour	14	Korn Ferry Tour Championship	20
Challenge Tour	12	Challenge Tour Grand Final	17
Korean Tour	9	n/a	n/a
PGA Tour Canada	6	n/a	n/a
PGA Tour Latinoamérica	6	n/a	n/a
Asian Development Tour	6	n/a	n/a
PGA Tour China	4/6	n/a	n/a
China Tour	4/6	n/a	n/a
Alps Tour	4/6	n/a	n/a
Nordic Golf League	4/6	n/a	n/a
ProGolf Tour	4/6	n/a	n/a
MENA Golf Tour	3/5	n/a	n/a
Big Easy Tour	3/5	n/a	n/a
All Thailand Golf Tour	5	n/a	n/a
Professional Golf Tour of India	5	n/a	n/a
Japan Challenge Tour	4	n/a	n/a

Seventy-two-hole tournaments which are reduced to 54 holes retain full points, but if a tournament is reduced to 36 holes, its points allocation is reduced by 25%. Fifty-four-hole tournaments reduced to 36 holes retain full points.

=== Player rankings ===
Having calculated the ranking of the event, the ranking points of the players for that event can be calculated. The winner's ranking points are the same as the ranking of the event, so that major winners get 100 ranking points. The second place golfer gets 60% of this amount, 40% for 3rd, 30% for 4th, 24% for 5th, down to 14% for 10th, 7% for 20th, 3.5% for 40th to 1.5% for 60th. Players tied for a position share the points for those positions so that if, for example, two players tie for second place they would each receive 50%, the average of 60% and 40%.

A player's ranking points for an event must be at least 1.2. Players who would get less than this using the above formula get no ranking points. For example, if an event has a ranking of 10 only the leading 12 players (and ties) receive any ranking points since the player in 12th place gets 12% of the event ranking (i.e. 1.2). The player in 13th position gets no points. Where there is a tie for the final scoring place, those players are guaranteed to receive at least 1.2 points. Using the above example, if there were two or more players tied for 12th place, each would receive 1.2 points. The only exceptions to this system are in the major championships where all players who make the cut get a minimum of 1.5 ranking points.

Since 2019, the PGA Tour has used its season-ending Tour Championship strictly to determine the final distribution of its FedEx Cup bonus pool. The 30 players are seeded according to their ranking in the FedEx Cup standings, with all players starting at a specified score with respect to par and the player leading the field after four rounds winning the FedEx Cup and receiving credit for an official PGA Tour win. The person with the lowest score over the event's four rounds receives no recognition from the tour. The OWGR ignores the PGA Tour's treatment of this event, awarding ranking points based solely on each player's performance during the Tour Championship itself.

=== Adjusted rankings ===
For the first 13 weeks after an event the player receives the full ranking points earned in that event. However, from then onwards they are reduced in equal weekly increments over the remainder of a two-year period. This gives priority to recent form. Each week the ranking points are reduced by a factor of 1/92 (approximately 1.09%) so that in week 14 only 98.91% of the ranking points are credited, continuing until week 104 when only 1.09% is credited. From week 105 the ranking points are completely lost.

=== Ranking average ===
The player's adjusted points for all events in the two-year period are then added together, and this total is divided by the number of events to give the average ranking. However, players are subject to both a minimum and maximum number of events over the two-year period. If a player competes in fewer than 40 tournaments over the two-year period his adjusted points total is divided by 40 and not the actual number of events he has played in. There is also a maximum of 52 tournaments, which means that only the player's 52 most recent tournaments (within the two-year period) are used.

The resulting averages for all players are put into descending order to produce the ranking table. This means that the player who has obtained most cumulative success does not necessarily come top of the rankings: it is average performance levels that are important, and some golfers play substantially more tournaments than others. New rankings are released every Monday.

== Importance of the rankings ==
A professional golfer's ranking is of considerable significance to his career. Currently a ranking in the World Top 50 grants automatic entry to all the majors and World Golf Championships; see table below. In addition, rankings are the main criterion for selection for the International Team in the Presidents Cup, while ranking points are one of the qualification criteria for the European Ryder Cup team. The rankings are also used to help select the field for various other tournaments.

Tournament	Automatic entries
The Open Championship	Top 50
U.S. Open	Top 60
PGA Championship	Top 100 (Note: The PGA Championship does not have an official automatic entry based on the Official World Golf Ranking. However, the PGA of America invites additional players, and has traditionally invited those inside the top 100 of the world rankings. It makes note of its strong field by referencing the number of top 100 ranked golfers entered in its press releases.)
Masters Tournament	Top 50
WGC Match Play	Top 64 (Note: Top 64 in the world ranking was the sole criterion for qualification for the WGC Match Play, with alternates invited in order from those outside the top 64.)
WGC Invitational	Top 50
WGC Championship	Top 50
WGC-HSBC Champions	Top 50
The Players Championship	Top 50
Summer Olympics (2016)	Top 15 (Note: At the 2016 Summer Olympics, the top-15 players in the world ranking were automatically eligible, subject to a limit of four players per country. Beyond this, players were eligible in world ranking order, subject to a maximum of two players from each country until the maximum field size of 60 was reached. Each of the five continents of the Olympic Movement and the host nation were also guaranteed representation.)

== Timeline of the "number one" ranking ==
The first official ranking list, the Sony Ranking, was published prior to the Masters in April 1986, with Bernhard Langer the first world No. 1 ranked player, ahead of Seve Ballesteros, who had topped the unofficial McCormack's World Golf Rankings at the end of the previous year. Ballesteros briefly held the No. 1 spot after Langer, before Greg Norman's worldwide success over the rest of that season made him the first year-end No. 1. Ballesteros took the No. 1 position back from Norman in 1987, and the pair exchanged the No. 1 position several times over the next two years. During 1990, Nick Faldo remained ranked just behind Norman despite winning three majors in two years (and more world ranking points in total than his rival, albeit having entered more events). As detailed in Mark McCormack's "World of Professional Golf 1991" annual, it was also the case (but less immediately apparent) that Norman had won a total of 14 events during the ranking period to Faldo's 10, and when the two had competed in the same tournament, had finished ahead of his rival 19 times to 11, so Norman's No. 1 position (on the new "average points" system) had some justification. Faldo did inherit the No. 1 ranking for the first time early in 1991.

In April 1991, a quirk in the way the rankings treated results from previous years meant that Ian Woosnam, who had never won a major, took the No. 1 spot from Faldo on the eve of the latter's attempt to win the Masters for a third year in succession; as if to justify his new ranking, Woosnam — and not Faldo — won the tournament. Twelve months later, Fred Couples similarly took over the No. 1 ranking shortly before the 1992 Masters, then also went on to make that tournament his first major victory. Faldo's Open victory in 1992 lifted him back to the No. 1 position, and he held that spot until replaced by Nick Price, who in 1994 became the first African ranked No. 1 after his back-to-back major victories that summer.

By 1996, Greg Norman had regained the top spot and ended 1996 and 1997 narrowly ahead of first Tom Lehman, and then Tiger Woods and Ernie Els in the rankings, despite his rivals enjoying major victories in those years while he won none. Lehman, Els and Woods would all briefly become No. 1 during 1997, Lehman for a week – to date, the only player to hold the No. 1 ranking for just one week. In 1996, Colin Montgomerie also led the rankings in total points earned over the two-year period (but never on average points per event); in 1997 Els was top of a similar "total points" list. Those were the last occasions on which a player led on "total" points but not average points until 2016, when Dustin Johnson similarly had more points in total than the world number one Jason Day. Woods then finished 1998 narrowly ahead of Mark O'Meara even though the latter won two major titles that year while Woods won just once on the PGA Tour. In March 1999, David Duval became world No. 1 after winning The Players Championship, his sixth victory in a twelve-month period that came before his first major victory (which would follow two years later at the Open Championship).

In 2000, Tiger Woods had an unprecedented season of success that saw him earn 948 world ranking points in a single calendar year, so many points that even had his 1999 points (which represented the previous single-season record) been totally discounted from the calculation, Woods would still have had a points average easily high enough to lead the rankings – and Woods would still have led at the end of 2001 even had he earned no further points that year. Tiger Woods dominated the No. 1 spot for the following five years, but when Vijay Singh won the PGA Championship in 2004 and with it took the No. 1 ranking, that change highlighted the fact that Woods had not won a major for over two years, and also the extraordinary success Singh had recently on tour had that had allowed him to overtake the American. Woods responded by winning the very next major, the 2005 Masters, and with it regained the No. 1 spot, which he would then retain for a further five years. Following knee surgery in the summer of 2008, Woods missed the entire second half of the year, while Pádraig Harrington won two major championships, to add to the Open Championship he won in 2007. Despite earning no further ranking points during his absence, Woods remained No. 1 on the ranking system in December 2008.

During 2010, there was much debate as to whether Woods' continued retention of the No. 1 ranking (which he held up until the end of October) was justified given his relatively poor form—Woods finished fourth in two major championships in 2010, but failed to finish in the top ten of any other events he entered. During the 2010 season, several of his rivals for the No. 1 spot - including Masters champion Phil Mickelson (who had won four majors since 2004 but had yet to reach No. 1 in the rankings), Lee Westwood (who had yet to win a major but had finished second in both the Masters and Open Championships in 2010), and then Martin Kaymer (who had won the PGA Championship among four worldwide wins)— each missed opportunities to win particular events that would have taken them above Woods, before Westwood finally became world No. 1 on October 31.

During 2011, the possession of the No. 1 ranking would be the subject of much discussion among European golf commentators as it passed from Westwood to Kaymer, back to Westwood and then in May to Luke Donald, who took No. 1 spot by defeating Westwood in a playoff for the BMW PGA Championship. Donald, in becoming the fifteenth world No. 1, also became the first ever to reach No. 1 before having won or finished runner-up in a major championship in his career. Donald's position at the top of the rankings was justified by his consistency through the rest of the 2011 season – becoming the first golfer ever to win the money title on both the European and PGA Tours in the same season.

In March 2012, Donald lost the No. 1 position to Rory McIlroy; the pair then exchanged the No. 1 position a further four times in the following two months, so the volatility of the No. 1 ranking again became a source of comment. At the end of 2012, McIlroy had opened up a clear lead at the top of the rankings, following his second major victory at the PGA Championship and emulating Donald in leading the money lists on both sides of the Atlantic. However, by the end of March 2013, a resurgent Tiger Woods had returned to the top of the rankings, after adding three PGA Tour wins in 2013 to his three victories from 2012 while McIlroy struggled with his form following equipment changes. Woods then suffered a back injury that sidelined him for the early part of 2014, and in his absence, Adam Scott, winner of the 2013 Masters, became the 17th world No. 1 on May 18, despite not winning an event in 2014 to that date; he would win the following week to secure his No. 1 position and avoid following Tom Lehman as a one-week No. 1. He held the No. 1 position until August 3, when McIlroy regained the top spot by following his Open Championship victory with another at the WGC-Bridgestone Invitational.

On August 16, 2015, following Jordan Spieth's second-place finish at the 2015 PGA Championship (that followed earlier wins at the Masters and the U.S. Open), Spieth became the 18th world No. 1. Over the following three weeks, the No. 1 spot passed back and forth between McIlroy and Spieth, due to the way each player's average points (which were almost identical) fluctuated (as their point weightings and events played divisors changed), until, on September 20, both were overtaken by Jason Day, the 2015 PGA Championship winner, who became the 19th world No. 1 with victory in the BMW Championship, his fifth of the season. A week later, Spieth regained the No. 1 spot from Day after winning the Tour Championship (and with it, the FedEx Cup), and concluded 2015 as world No. 1, but Day's continued good form took him back to number one after winning the WGC Matchplay in March 2016.

On February 19, 2017, Dustin Johnson became the 20th player to reach number one in the rankings following his victory at the Genesis Open. He would remain number one for over a year before being overtaken in May 2018 by Justin Thomas, who had won the PGA championship and four other events in 2017. Johnson regained top spot but was overtaken again in September 2018 by Justin Rose, who had finished second at the Open and again in two FedEx Cup playoff events. Rose became the 22nd player to reach number one, and the fourth Englishman. Johnson regained the number one position from Rose but was replaced by a new number one for a third time in 2018 on October 21, when Brooks Koepka added a victory in the CJ Cup to his two 2018 major titles. Koepka remained number one on the ranking at the end of 2018, even though Rose had amassed a higher total of ranking points (from more events entered). Dustin Johnson regained the number one position early in 2019 with victory at the WGC-Mexico Championship, but Koepka returned to number one when he retained his PGA Championship title in May 2019. Koepka remained number one at the end of 2019, although FedEx Cup winner Rory McIlroy had (like Rose the year before) amassed more ranking points in total than him.

On February 9, 2020, McIlroy regained the number one position as his higher 2019 points total became reflected in the weighted average. Following the resumption of golf on the PGA Tour after suspension due to the 2020 COVID-19 pandemic, Jon Rahm became the 24th player to top the world rankings, and the second Spaniard, on July 19 after his victory at the Memorial Tournament, his fourth worldwide win in twelve months. Rahm became the second player after Luke Donald to become world number one before having won or been runner-up in a major championship. The following month Dustin Johnson regained the number one position following his victory in the Northern Trust event and remained number one at the end of 2020, strengthening his hold on the position by winning his first Masters Tournament in November. Rahm regained the number one position following his victory in the U.S. Open in June 2021.

In March 2022, Scottie Scheffler became the 25th player to reach number one after winning the WGC Match Play, his third victory of the 2022 season. Scheffler became the third player to become world number one before winning or finishing runner-up in a major. Emulating Ian Woosnam in 1991, Scheffler then promptly won his first major in his very first start as world number one, the 2022 Masters Tournament.

== Rankings archive ==
=== Year-end world number 1 ranked golfers ===
- 1986 Greg Norman
- 1987 Norman (2)
- 1988 Seve Ballesteros
- 1989 Norman (3)
- 1990 Norman (4)
- 1991 Ian Woosnam
- 1992 Nick Faldo
- 1993 Faldo (2)
- 1994 Nick Price
- 1995 Norman (5)
- 1996 Norman (6)
- 1997 Norman (7)
- 1998 Tiger Woods
- 1999 Woods (2)
- 2000 Woods (3)
- 2001 Woods (4)
- 2002 Woods (5)
- 2003 Woods (6)
- 2004 Vijay Singh
- 2005 Woods (7)
- 2006 Woods (8)
- 2007 Woods (9)
- 2008 Woods (10)
- 2009 Woods (11)
- 2010 Lee Westwood
- 2011 Luke Donald
- 2012 Rory McIlroy
- 2013 Woods (12)
- 2014 McIlroy (2)
- 2015 Jordan Spieth
- 2016 Jason Day
- 2017 Dustin Johnson
- 2018 Brooks Koepka
- 2019 Koepka (2)
- 2020 Johnson (2)
- 2021 Jon Rahm
- 2022 McIlroy (3)
- 2023 Scottie Scheffler
- 2024 Scheffler (2)
- 2025 Scheffler (3)

=== Mark H. McCormack Award ===
Awarded to the player with the most weeks at No. 1 during calendar year and named after Mark McCormack, originator of the ranking.

- 1998 Tiger Woods
- 1999 Woods (2)
- 2000 Woods (3)
- 2001 Woods (4)
- 2002 Woods (5)
- 2003 Woods (6)
- 2004 Woods (7)
- 2005 Woods (8)
- 2006 Woods (9)
- 2007 Woods (10)
- 2008 Woods (11)
- 2009 Woods (12)
- 2010 Woods (13)
- 2011 Luke Donald
- 2012 Rory McIlroy
- 2013 Woods (14)
- 2014 McIlroy (2)
- 2015 McIlroy (3)
- 2016 Jason Day
- 2017 Dustin Johnson
- 2018 Johnson (2)
- 2019 Brooks Koepka
- 2020 Johnson (3)
- 2021 Jon Rahm
- 2022 Scottie Scheffler
- 2023 Scheffler (2)
- 2024 Scheffler (3)
- 2025 Scheffler (4)

=== Single-season total ranking points leaders ===
Although not recognized by any official award, these golfers have won the most World Ranking Points during the years for which the rankings have been calculated (points totals prior to 1996 are scaled to the current standard, i.e. major wins are worth 100 points):

- 1983 Seve Ballesteros 422
- 1984 Tom Watson 376
- 1985 Bernhard Langer 368
- 1986 Greg Norman 582
- 1987 Ballesteros
  and Ian Woosnam 326
- 1988 Ballesteros 482
- 1989 Norman 422
- 1990 José María Olazábal 466
- 1991 Ballesteros 392
- 1992 Nick Faldo 596
- 1993 Norman 492
- 1994 Ernie Els 554
- 1995 Norman 430
- 1996 Tom Lehman 370
- 1997 Els 394
- 1998 Mark O'Meara 408
- 1999 Tiger Woods 750
- 2000 Woods 948.22
- 2001 Woods 568.11
- 2002 Woods 684.00
- 2003 Vijay Singh 550.87
- 2004 Singh 707.57
- 2005 Woods 772.44
- 2006 Woods 746.28
- 2007 Woods 689.60
- 2008 Woods 426.24
- 2009 Woods 604.54
- 2010 Lee Westwood 374.21
- 2011 Luke Donald 533.49
- 2012 Rory McIlroy 596.99
- 2013 Woods 488.25
- 2014 McIlroy 567.77
- 2015 Jordan Spieth 630.50
- 2016 Dustin Johnson 454.20
- 2017 Spieth 450.43
- 2018 Bryson DeChambeau 392.43
- 2019 McIlroy 496.25
- 2020 Johnson 463.54
- 2021 Collin Morikawa 418.14
- 2022 Scottie Scheffler 480.89
- 2023 Scheffler 457.958
- 2024 Scheffler 727.455
- 2025 Scheffler 642.515

=== World Ranking of major championship winners ===
The table shows the World Rankings of the winners of each major championship in the week before their victory.

Year	Masters Tournament		U.S. Open		The Open Championship		PGA Championship	
1986	(United States) Jack Nicklaus	33	(United States) Raymond Floyd	c.20	(Australia) Greg Norman	3	(United States) Bob Tway	c.25
1987	(United States) Larry Mize	36	(United States) Scott Simpson	27	(England) Nick Faldo	46	(United States) Larry Nelson	84
1988	(Scotland) Sandy Lyle	3	(United States) Curtis Strange	5	(Spain) Seve Ballesteros	4	(United States) Jeff Sluman	71
1989	(England) Nick Faldo	5	(United States) Curtis Strange	4	(United States) Mark Calcavecchia	11	(United States) Payne Stewart	13
1990	(England) Nick Faldo	2	(United States) Hale Irwin	90	(England) Nick Faldo	2	(Australia) Wayne Grady	55
1991	(Wales) Ian Woosnam	1	(United States) Payne Stewart	8	(Australia) Ian Baker-Finch	25	(United States) John Daly	168
1992	(United States) Fred Couples	1	(United States) Tom Kite	22	(England) Nick Faldo	2	(Zimbabwe) Nick Price	15
1993	(Germany) Bernhard Langer	5	(United States) Lee Janzen	34	(Australia) Greg Norman	4	(United States) Paul Azinger	6
1994	(Spain) José María Olazábal	10	(South Africa) Ernie Els	11	(Zimbabwe) Nick Price	3	(Zimbabwe) Nick Price	2
1995	(United States) Ben Crenshaw	33	(United States) Corey Pavin	9	(United States) John Daly	109	(Australia) Steve Elkington	17
1996	(England) Nick Faldo	9	(United States) Steve Jones	99	(United States) Tom Lehman	13	(United States) Mark Brooks	44
1997	(United States) Tiger Woods	13	(South Africa) Ernie Els	8	(United States) Justin Leonard	19	(United States) Davis Love III	17
1998	(United States) Mark O'Meara	14	(United States) Lee Janzen	42	(United States) Mark O'Meara	12	(Fiji) Vijay Singh	18
1999	(Spain) José María Olazábal	34	(United States) Payne Stewart	13	(Scotland) Paul Lawrie	159	(United States) Tiger Woods	2
2000	(Fiji) Vijay Singh	8	(United States) Tiger Woods	1	(United States) Tiger Woods	1	(United States) Tiger Woods	1
2001	(United States) Tiger Woods	1	(South Africa) Retief Goosen	44	(United States) David Duval	7	(United States) David Toms	19
2002	(United States) Tiger Woods	1	(United States) Tiger Woods	1	(South Africa) Ernie Els	3	(United States) Rich Beem	73
2003	(Canada) Mike Weir	10	(United States) Jim Furyk	10	(United States) Ben Curtis	396	(United States) Shaun Micheel	169
2004	(United States) Phil Mickelson	8	(South Africa) Retief Goosen	9	(United States) Todd Hamilton	56	(Fiji) Vijay Singh	3
2005	(United States) Tiger Woods	2	(New Zealand) Michael Campbell	80	(United States) Tiger Woods	1	(United States) Phil Mickelson	4
2006	(United States) Phil Mickelson	4	(Australia) Geoff Ogilvy	17	(United States) Tiger Woods	1	(United States) Tiger Woods	1
2007	(United States) Zach Johnson	56	(Argentina) Ángel Cabrera	41	(Republic of Ireland) Pádraig Harrington	10	(United States) Tiger Woods	1
2008	(South Africa) Trevor Immelman	29	(United States) Tiger Woods	1	(Republic of Ireland) Pádraig Harrington	14	(Republic of Ireland) Pádraig Harrington	3
2009	(Argentina) Ángel Cabrera	69	(United States) Lucas Glover	71	(United States) Stewart Cink	33	(South Korea) Yang Yong-eun	110
2010	(United States) Phil Mickelson	3	(Northern Ireland) Graeme McDowell	37	(South Africa) Louis Oosthuizen	54	(Germany) Martin Kaymer	13
2011	(South Africa) Charl Schwartzel	29	(Northern Ireland) Rory McIlroy	8	(Northern Ireland) Darren Clarke	111	(United States) Keegan Bradley	108
2012	(United States) Bubba Watson	16	(United States) Webb Simpson	14	(South Africa) Ernie Els	40	(Northern Ireland) Rory McIlroy	3
2013	(Australia) Adam Scott	7	(England) Justin Rose	5	(United States) Phil Mickelson	5	(United States) Jason Dufner	21
2014	(United States) Bubba Watson	12	(Germany) Martin Kaymer	28	(Northern Ireland) Rory McIlroy	8	(Northern Ireland) Rory McIlroy	1
2015	(United States) Jordan Spieth	4	(United States) Jordan Spieth	2	(United States) Zach Johnson	25	(Australia) Jason Day	5
2016	(England) Danny Willett	12	(United States) Dustin Johnson	6	(Sweden) Henrik Stenson	6	(United States) Jimmy Walker	48
2017	(Spain) Sergio García	11	(United States) Brooks Koepka	22	(United States) Jordan Spieth	3	(United States) Justin Thomas	14
2018	(United States) Patrick Reed	24	(United States) Brooks Koepka	9	(Italy) Francesco Molinari	15	(United States) Brooks Koepka	4
Year	Masters Tournament		PGA Championship		U.S. Open		The Open Championship	
2019	(United States) Tiger Woods	12	(United States) Brooks Koepka	3	(United States) Gary Woodland	25	(Republic of Ireland) Shane Lowry	33
2020	(United States) Dustin Johnson	1	(United States) Collin Morikawa	12	(United States) Bryson DeChambeau	9	Tournament not held	–
2021	(Japan) Hideki Matsuyama	25	(United States) Phil Mickelson	115	(Spain) Jon Rahm	3	(United States) Collin Morikawa	4
2022	(United States) Scottie Scheffler	1	(United States) Justin Thomas	9	(England) Matt Fitzpatrick	18	(Australia) Cameron Smith	6
2023	(Spain) Jon Rahm	3	(United States) Brooks Koepka	44	(United States) Wyndham Clark	32	(United States) Brian Harman	26
2024	(United States) Scottie Scheffler	1	(United States) Xander Schauffele	3	(United States) Bryson DeChambeau	38	(United States) Xander Schauffele	3
2025	(Northern Ireland) Rory McIlroy	2	(United States) Scottie Scheffler	1	(United States) J. J. Spaun	25	(United States) Scottie Scheffler	1
2026	(Northern Ireland) Rory McIlroy	2	(England) Aaron Rai	44	(United States) Wyndham Clark	34	(New Zealand) Ryan Fox	56

Note: 2020 events were played in a different order due to the COVID-19 pandemic.

Summary

Event	Total	World 1–10	World 11–50	World 51–100	World 101–200	World 201+
Masters Tournament	41	24	15	2	–	–
PGA Championship	41	17	15	4	5	–
U.S. Open	41	17	20	4	–	–
Open Championship	40	20	13	3	3	1
All majors	163	78	63	13	8	1

== See also ==
- List of world number one male golfers
- List of male golfers who have been in the world top 10
- Women's World Golf Rankings – for female professional golfers
- World Amateur Golf Ranking – for male and female amateur golfers
