= Father/Son Challenge =

Golf tournament

Coordinates: 28.404°N 81.433°W

PNC Championship

Tournament information
- Location: Orlando, Florida
- Established: 1995
- Course: Ritz-Carlton Golf Club
- Par: 72
- Length: 7,234 yards (6,615 m)
- Organized by: PGA of America
- Tour: PGA Tour Champions (unofficial event)
- Format: Two-person scramble
- Prize fund: US$1,000,000
- Month played: December
- Website: pncchampionship.com

Tournament record score
- Aggregate: 111 Matt Kuchar and son Cameron Kuchar (2025)
- To par: −33 as above

Current champion
- (United States) Matt Kuchar and son Cameron Kuchar

Final champion
- Location in the United States Location in Florida

The Father/Son Challenge, titled since 2020 as the PNC Championship under a sponsorship agreement with PNC Financial Services, is an annual golf tournament for two-player teams, consisting of PGA Tour and Champions Tour golfers and (usually) their sons. It is played over two days (36 holes) for the Willie Park Trophy, in memory of the father and son British Open champions Willie Park Sr. and Willie Park Jr. The field of twenty teams plays a scramble format. In 2012, the prize fund was $1,000,000; the tournament is jointly owned by IMG and NBC Sports.

The qualifying player must have won a major championship or The Players Championship (often touted as the "fifth major") to be eligible for an invitation. The guest team members range from middle school age up to senior citizens, and sometimes include a few with tour golf careers of their own but cannot be a touring professional at the time of the tournament.

Venues have been as follows:

- 1995–1998 Vero Beach, Florida
- 1999 Twin Eagles Golf Club in Naples, Florida
- 2000–2002 The Ocean Club in Paradise Island, Bahamas
- 2003–2008 Champions Gate Golf Resort in Orlando, Florida
- 2009–2011 not played
- 2012–present Ritz-Carlton Golf Club in Orlando, Florida

The event's name took on a somewhat looser interpretation when Fuzzy Zoeller teamed up with his daughter Gretchen in 2005. In 2013 and 2016, Bernhard Langer played with his daughter Christina. In 2006 and 2007, Arnold Palmer played with his grandson Sam Saunders.

In 2024, qualifying entrants included Annika Sörenstam, who partnered with her 13-year-old son Willie McGee, and Nelly Korda, whose partner was her father, Petr Korda.

== Winners ==
Year	Winners	Score	To par	Margin of victory	Runners-up
PNC Championship
2025	(United States) Matt Kuchar and son Cameron Kuchar	111	−33	7 strokes	(United States) John Daly and son John Daly II (United States) Davis Love III and son Dru Love
2024	(Germany) Bernhard Langer (6) and son Jason Langer	116	−28	Playoff	(United States) Tiger Woods and son Charlie Woods
2023	(Germany) Bernhard Langer (5) and son Jason Langer	119	−25	2 strokes	(United States) David Duval and son Brady Duval
2022	(Fiji) Vijay Singh and son Qass Singh	118	−26	2 strokes	(United States) John Daly and son John Daly II and (United States) Justin Thomas and father Mike Thomas
2021	(United States) John Daly and son John Daly II	117	−27	2 strokes	(United States) Tiger Woods and son Charlie Woods
2020	(United States) Justin Thomas and father Mike Thomas	119	−25	1 stroke	(Fiji) Vijay Singh and son Qass Singh
PNC Father-Son Challenge
2019	(Germany) Bernhard Langer (4) and son Jason Langer	120	−24	Playoff	(South Africa) Retief Goosen and son Leo Goosen (United States) Tom Lehman and son Thomas Lehman
2018	(United States) Davis Love III (2) and son Dru Love	118	−26	3 strokes	(United States) Stewart Cink and son Connor Cink (United States) John Daly and son John Daly II (South Africa) Retief Goosen and son Leo Goosen
2017	(Argentina) Ángel Cabrera and son Ángel Cabrera Jr.	119	−25	1 stroke	(United States) David Duval and stepson Nick Karavites (Germany) Bernhard Langer and son Jason Langer
2016	(United States) David Duval and stepson Nick Karavites	123	−21	1 stroke	(United States) Stewart Cink and son Connor Cink
2015	(United States) Lanny Wadkins and son Tucker Wadkins	124	−20	Playoff	(United States) Fred Funk and son Taylor Funk (United States) Davis Love III and son Dru Love (United States) Larry Nelson and son Drew Nelson
2014	(Germany) Bernhard Langer (3) and son Jason Langer	121	−23	2 strokes	(United States) Davis Love III and son Dru Love
2013	(United States) Stewart Cink and son Connor Cink	122	−22	3 strokes	(Australia) Steve Elkington and son Sam Elkington (Fiji) Vijay Singh and son Qass Singh
2012	(United States) Davis Love III and son Dru Love	121	−23	1 stroke	(United States) Larry Nelson and son Josh Nelson
Del Webb Father/Son Challenge
2009–2011: No tournament
2008	(United States) Larry Nelson (3) and son Drew Nelson	123	−21	2 strokes	(United States) Davis Love III and son Dru Love
2007	(United States) Larry Nelson (2) and son Josh Nelson	120	−24	2 strokes	(United States) Bob Tway and son Kevin Tway
2006	(Germany) Bernhard Langer (2) and son Stefan Langer	120	−24	1 stroke	(Fiji) Vijay Singh and son Qass Singh (United States) Bob Tway and son Kevin Tway
MBNA WorldPoints Father/Son Challenge
2005	(Germany) Bernhard Langer and son Stefan Langer	120	−24	1 stroke	(United States) Raymond Floyd and son Robert Floyd
Office Depot Father/Son Challenge
2004	(United States) Larry Nelson and son Drew Nelson	119	−25	3 strokes	(New Zealand) Bob Charles and son David Charles
2003	(United States) Hale Irwin and son Steve Irwin	123	−21	1 stroke	(United States) Jack Nicklaus and son Jack Nicklaus Jr.
2002	(United States) Craig Stadler and son Kevin Stadler	120	−24	Playoff	(United States) Hale Irwin and son Steve Irwin
2001	(United States) Raymond Floyd (5) and son Robert Floyd	124	−20	1 stroke	(United States) Hale Irwin and son Steve Irwin
2000	(United States) Raymond Floyd (4) and son Robert Floyd	122	−22	Playoff	(United States) Johnny Miller and son Scott Miller
1999	(United States) Jack Nicklaus and son Gary Nicklaus	119	−25	Playoff	(United States) Raymond Floyd and son Robert Floyd
1998	(New Zealand) Bob Charles and son David Charles	119	−25	4 strokes	(United States) Craig Stadler and son Kevin Stadler
1997	(United States) Raymond Floyd (3) and son Raymond Floyd Jr.	120	−24	1 stroke	(United States) Dave Stockton and son Ron Stockton
1996	(United States) Raymond Floyd (2) and son Raymond Floyd Jr.	124	−20	2 strokes	(United States) Dave Stockton and son Ron Stockton
1995	(United States) Raymond Floyd and son Raymond Floyd Jr.	119	−25	6 strokes	(United States) Hale Irwin and son Steve Irwin
