= Craig Stadler =

American professional golfer (born 1953)

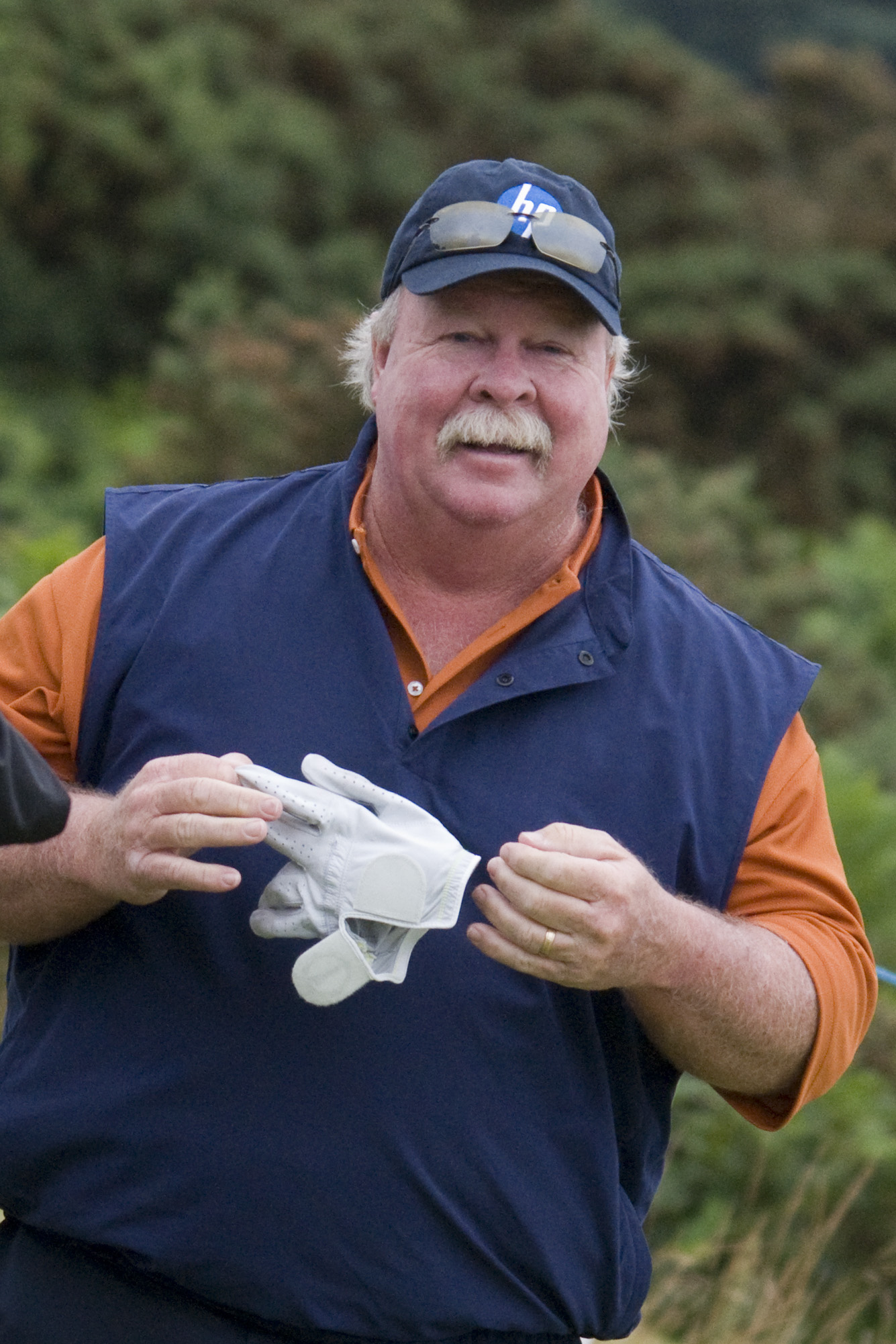
- Stadler at the 2011 Senior Open Championship

Personal information
- Full name: Craig Robert Stadler
- Nickname: The Walrus
- Nationality: United States
- Born: June 2, 1953 (age 73) San Diego, California, U.S.
- Height: 5 ft 10 in (1.78 m)
- Weight: 250 lb (110 kg; 18 st)
- Spouse: Jan Zumbrunnen
- Children: 2, including Kevin

Career
- Sport: Golf
- College: University of Southern California
- Turned professional: 1976
- Former tours: PGA Tour; Champions Tour
- Professional wins: 30
- Highest ranking: 19 (February 2, 1992)

Number of wins by tour
- PGA Tour: 13
- European Tour: 3
- Japan Golf Tour: 1
- PGA Tour Champions: 9
- Other: 5

Best results in major championships (wins: 1)
- Masters Tournament: Won: 1982
- PGA Championship: 6th: 1978
- U.S. Open: T8: 1990
- The Open Championship: T6: 1980

Achievements and awards
- PGA Tour money list winner: 1982
- Champions Tour Rookie of the Year: 2003
- Champions Tour money list winner: 2004
- Champions Tour Player of the Year: 2004
- Champions Tour Byron Nelson Award: 2004

Craig Robert Stadler (born June 2, 1953) is an American professional golfer who has won numerous tournaments at both the PGA Tour and Champions Tour level, including one major championship, the 1982 Masters Tournament.

== Early life ==
Stadler was born in San Diego, California. His father introduced him to golf at age four, and he displayed a talent for golf early in life. Stadler attended La Jolla High School.

Stadler's brother Gary Stadler is a Billboard-charting recording artist.

== Amateur career ==
Stadler won the 1973 U.S. Amateur, while attending the University of Southern California, where he was a teammate of future PGA Tour winners Mark Pfeil and Scott Simpson. Stadler was an All-American all four years – first-team his sophomore and junior years; second-team his freshman and senior years. Stadler finished college in 1975.

== Professional career ==
In 1976, Stadler turned professional. He won his first two PGA Tour events in 1980, at the Bob Hope Desert Classic and the Greater Greensboro Open. His career year was 1982 when he won four PGA Tour events including the Masters Tournament after a playoff with Dan Pohl and the World Series of Golf at the end of the year. Stadler won the money list for the only time. His next win was at the 1984 Byron Nelson Classic.

Despite playing relatively well, Stadler did not win a PGA Tour event for over 7 years (May 1984 – November 1991) during the heart of his career. During this period he recorded six runner-up performances and dozens of top-10s on the PGA Tour. He had more success at winning international tournaments. He won the 1985 Swiss Open on the European Tour and the 1987 Dunlop Phoenix Tournament on the Japan Golf Tour. He had great success at the Scandinavian Enterprise Open too, an official event on the European Tour, finishing runner-up at the 1983 and 1986 events until finally winning in 1990. His winless streak in America was broken at the final event of the 1991 season, defeating Russ Cochran in a playoff at the Tour Championship. Stadler won the B.C. Open in 2003, becoming the first player over age 50 to win a PGA Tour event in 28 years and the first player ever to win on the PGA Tour after he had won on the Champions Tour. He won 13 PGA Tour events in all, and played on the 1983 and 1985 Ryder Cup teams.

Stadler began playing on the Champions Tour upon becoming eligible in June 2003. His greatest successes came during his first two years of eligibility; he was the leading money winner in his first full year on that tour in 2004. Stadler underwent total left-hip-replacement surgery in Los Angeles on September 15, 2010, which limits his playing time. Stadler announced that the 2014 Masters Tournament, his 38th and in which he played with Kevin, was his last.

== Personal life ==
Stadler lives in Evergreen, Colorado. His son Kevin is also a PGA Tour champion. Stadler and his son Kevin are the only father and son who have both won on both the PGA Tour and the European Tour.

In 1984, United Airlines held a promotion for its frequent flyer members in which any member who flew the airline to all 50 states in the United States in a 50-day period would receive free first-class flights for one year. Stadler was one of 78 people who completed the challenge.

== In popular culture ==
- In 1994, he was the featured coach for the Sega Saturn video game Pebble Beach Golf Links.
- In 1996, Stadler appeared as himself in the film Tin Cup.

== Amateur wins ==
- 1973 U.S. Amateur
- 1975 Southwestern Amateur

== Professional wins (30) ==
=== PGA Tour wins (13) ===
Legend
Major championships (1)
Tour Championships (1)
Other PGA Tour (11)

No.	Date	Tournament	Winning score	Margin of victory	Runner(s)-up
1	Jan 13, 1980	Bob Hope Desert Classic	−17 (69-68-70-69-67=343)	2 strokes	(United States) Tom Purtzer, (United States) Mike Sullivan
2	Apr 6, 1980	Greater Greensboro Open	−13 (67-69-71-68=275)	6 strokes	(United States) George Burns, (United States) Billy Kratzert, (Australia) Jack Newton, (United States) Jerry Pate
3	May 31, 1981	Kemper Open	−10 (67-69-66-68=270)	6 strokes	(United States) Tom Watson, (United States) Tom Weiskopf
4	Jan 10, 1982	Joe Garagiola-Tucson Open	−14 (65-64-66-71=266)	3 strokes	(United States) Vance Heafner, (United States) John Mahaffey
5	Apr 11, 1982	Masters Tournament	−4 (75-69-67-73=284)	Playoff	(United States) Dan Pohl
6	Jun 6, 1982	Kemper Open (2)	−13 (72-67-67-69=275)	7 strokes	(Spain) Seve Ballesteros
7	Aug 29, 1982	World Series of Golf	−2 (70-68-75-65=278)	Playoff	(United States) Raymond Floyd
8	May 13, 1984	Byron Nelson Golf Classic	−8 (70-71-64-71=276)	1 stroke	(United States) David Edwards
9	Nov 3, 1991	The Tour Championship	−5 (68-68-72-71=279)	Playoff	(United States) Russ Cochran
10	Aug 30, 1992	NEC World Series of Golf (2)	−7 (69-65-69-70=273)	1 stroke	(United States) Corey Pavin
11	Feb 27, 1994	Buick Invitational of California	−20 (67-67-68-66=268)	1 stroke	(United States) Steve Lowery
12	Feb 25, 1996	Nissan Open	−6 (67-70-73-68=278)	1 stroke	(United States) Mark Brooks, (United States) Fred Couples, (United States) Scott Simpson, (United States) Mark Wiebe
13	Jul 20, 2003	B.C. Open	−21 (67-69-68-63=267)	1 stroke	(Germany) Alex Čejka, (United States) Steve Lowery

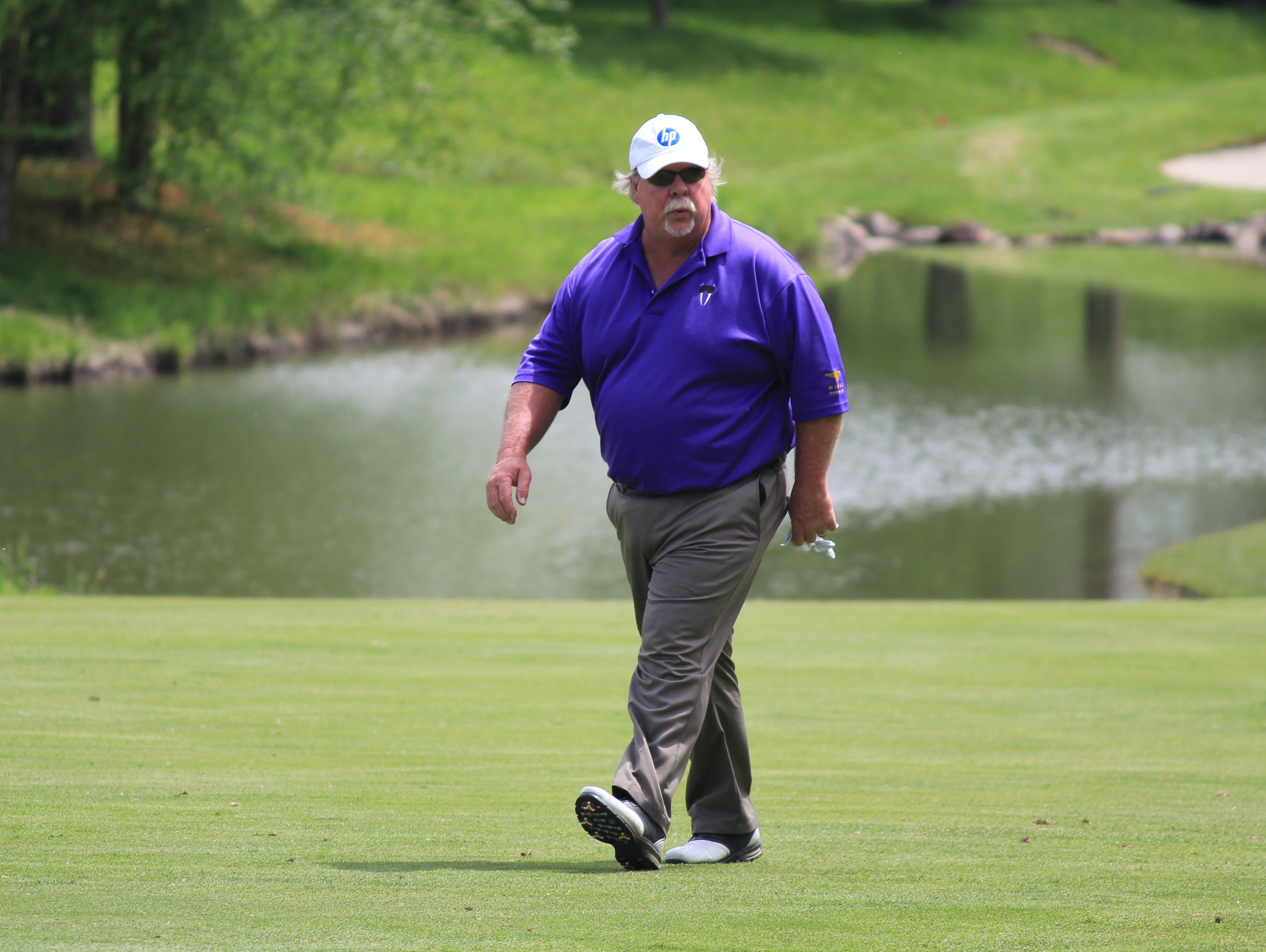
Stadler at the 2011 Principal Charity Classic.

PGA Tour playoff record (3–3)

No.	Year	Tournament	Opponent	Result
1	1982	Masters Tournament	(United States) Dan Pohl	Won with par on first extra hole
2	1982	World Series of Golf	(United States) Raymond Floyd	Won with par on fourth extra hole
3	1985	Bob Hope Classic	(United States) Lanny Wadkins	Lost to birdie on fifth extra hole
4	1987	Hawaiian Open	(United States) Corey Pavin	Lost to birdie on second extra hole
5	1991	The Tour Championship	(United States) Russ Cochran	Won with birdie on second extra hole
6	2000	Shell Houston Open	(Australia) Robert Allenby	Lost to par on fourth extra hole

=== European Tour wins (3) ===
Legend
Major championships (1)
Other European Tour (2)

No.	Date	Tournament	Winning score	Margin of victory	Runner(s)-up
1	Apr 11, 1982	Masters Tournament	−4 (75-69-67-73=284)	Playoff	(United States) Dan Pohl
2	Sep 8, 1985	Ebel European Masters Swiss Open	−21 (68-65-67-67=267)	2 strokes	(Northern Ireland) David Feherty, (Sweden) Ove Sellberg
3	Jun 10, 1990	Scandinavian Enterprise Open	−20 (68-72-67-61=268)	4 strokes	(Australia) Craig Parry

European Tour playoff record (1–1)

No.	Year	Tournament	Opponent	Result
1	1982	Masters Tournament	(United States) Dan Pohl	Won with par on first extra hole
2	1986	Scandinavian Enterprise Open	(New Zealand) Greg Turner	Lost to birdie on first extra hole

=== PGA of Japan Tour wins (1) ===
No.	Date	Tournament	Winning score	Margin of victory	Runner-up
1	Nov 22, 1987	Dunlop Phoenix Tournament	−11 (71-65-69-72=277)	1 stroke	(United States) Scott Hoch

=== South American Tour wins (1) ===
- 1992 Argentine Open

=== Other wins (4) ===
No.	Date	Tournament	Winning score	Margin of victory	Runner(s)-up
1	Apr 9, 1978	Magnolia State Classic	−12 (67-66-72-63=268)	1 stroke	(United States) Bob Eastwood, (United States) Bruce Fleisher
2	Aug 19, 1986	Jerry Ford Invitational	−9 (67-68=135)	2 strokes	(United States) Mark O'Meara
3	Aug 22, 1989	Fred Meyer Challenge (with (United States) Joey Sindelar)	−19 (62-63=125)	1 stroke	(United States) Mark Calcavecchia and (United States) Bob Gilder
4	Dec 15, 2002	Office Depot Father/Son Challenge (with son Kevin Stadler)	−24 (60-60=120)	Playoff	(United States) Hale Irwin and son Steve Irwin

Other playoff record (1–1)

No.	Year	Tournament	Opponent(s)	Result
1	1982	Nedbank Million Dollar Challenge	(United States) Raymond Floyd	Lost to par on fourth extra hole
2	2002	Office Depot Father/Son Challenge (with son Kevin Stadler)	(United States) Hale Irwin and son Steve Irwin	Won with birdie on first extra hole

=== Champions Tour wins (9) ===
Legend
Champions Tour major championships (2)
Other Champions Tour (7)

No.	Date	Tournament	Winning score	Margin of victory	Runner(s)-up
1	Jul 13, 2003	Ford Senior Players Championship	−17 (67-73-65-66=271)	3 strokes	(United States) Tom Kite, (United States) Jim Thorpe, (United States) Tom Watson
2	Sep 28, 2003	Greater Hickory Classic at Rock Barn	−15 (66-69-66=201)	2 strokes	(United States) Larry Nelson
3	Oct 19, 2003	SBC Championship	−15 (67-64-67=198)	4 strokes	(United States) Bob Gilder
4	Feb 15, 2004	ACE Group Classic	−10 (67-67-72=206)	Playoff	(United States) Gary Koch, (United States) Tom Watson
5	Jun 27, 2004	Bank of America Championship	−15 (68-69-64=201)	4 strokes	(United States) Tom Kite, (United States) Tom Purtzer, (United States) D. A. Weibring
6	Aug 29, 2004	JELD-WEN Tradition	−13 (70-70-68-67=275)	1 stroke	(United States) Allen Doyle, (United States) Jerry Pate
7	Sep 5, 2004	First Tee Open at Pebble Beach	−15 (72-63-66=201)	3 strokes	(United States) Jay Haas
8	Sep 26, 2004	SAS Championship	−17 (65-68-66=199)	6 strokes	(United States) Tom Jenkins
9	Jun 23, 2013	Encompass Championship	−13 (67-65-71=203)	1 stroke	(United States) Fred Couples

Champions Tour playoff record (1–2)

No.	Year	Tournament	Opponents	Result
1	2004	ACE Group Classic	(United States) Gary Koch, (United States) Tom Watson	Won with birdie on first extra hole
2	2007	Boeing Classic	(United States) R. W. Eaks, (United States) David Eger, (United States) Gil Morgan, (Japan) Naomichi Ozaki, (United States) Dana Quigley, (Zimbabwe) Denis Watson	Watson won with eagle on second extra hole Eger, Morgan, Ozaki and Quigley eliminated by birdie on first hole
3	2009	Liberty Mutual Legends of Golf (with (United States) Jeff Sluman)	(United States) Tom Lehman and (Germany) Bernhard Langer	Lost to par on second extra hole

== Major championships ==
=== Wins (1) ===
Year	Championship	54 holes	Winning score	Margin	Runner-up
1982	Masters Tournament	3 shot lead	−4 (75-69-67-73=284)	Playoff^{1}	(United States) Dan Pohl

^{1}Defeated Pohl with par on first extra hole.

=== Results timeline ===
Tournament	1974	1975	1976	1977	1978	1979
Masters Tournament	CUT	CUT				T7
U.S. Open	CUT					CUT
The Open Championship		CUT				
PGA Championship					6	CUT

Tournament	1980	1981	1982	1983	1984	1985	1986	1987	1988	1989
Masters Tournament	T26	T43	1	T6	T35	T6	CUT	T17	3	CUT
U.S. Open	T16	T26	T22	T10	WD	CUT	T15	T24	T25	
The Open Championship	T6	CUT	T35	T12	T28	CUT	WD	T8	T60	T13
PGA Championship	T55	CUT	T16	T63	T18	T18	T30	T28	T15	T7

Tournament	1990	1991	1992	1993	1994	1995	1996	1997	1998	1999
Masters Tournament	T14	T12	T25	T34	CUT	CUT	T29	T26	T41	T38
U.S. Open	T8	T19	T33	T33	CUT					
The Open Championship	CUT	T101	T64		T24	CUT	T45	CUT		
PGA Championship	T57	T7	T48	CUT	T19	T8	CUT	T53	T38	CUT

Tournament	2000	2001	2002	2003	2004	2005	2006	2007	2008	2009
Masters Tournament	CUT	CUT	T32	49	CUT	50	CUT	T49	CUT	CUT
U.S. Open	CUT		T18							
The Open Championship										
PGA Championship	T64									

Tournament	2010	2011	2012	2013	2014
Masters Tournament	CUT	CUT	CUT	CUT	CUT
U.S. Open					
The Open Championship					
PGA Championship					

Win
Top 10
Did not play

CUT = missed the halfway cut (3rd round cut in 1975 and 1985 Open Championships)
WD = withdrew
"T" indicates a tie for a place.

=== Summary ===
Tournament	Wins	2nd	3rd	Top-5	Top-10	Top-25	Events	Cuts made
Masters Tournament	1	0	1	2	5	9	38	21
U.S. Open	0	0	0	0	2	9	18	12
The Open Championship	0	0	0	0	2	5	18	11
PGA Championship	0	0	0	0	4	9	23	18
Totals	1	0	1	2	13	32	97	62

- Most consecutive cuts made – 11 (1990 PGA – 1993 U.S. Open)
- Longest streak of top-10s – 2 (twice)

== Results in The Players Championship ==
Tournament	1977	1978	1979	1980	1981	1982	1983	1984	1985	1986	1987	1988	1989
The Players Championship	CUT	CUT	T67	T67	CUT	T6	T63	T3	T13	CUT	CUT	T45	T21

Tournament	1990	1991	1992	1993	1994	1995	1996	1997	1998	1999	2000	2001	2002	2003	2004
The Players Championship	T61	CUT	CUT	CUT	CUT	T14	T41	CUT	T31	T62	CUT	CUT	T36		T66

Top 10
Did not play

CUT = missed the halfway cut
"T" indicates a tie for a place

== Results in World Golf Championships ==
Tournament	1999	2000	2001
Match Play	R32		QF
Championship			NT^{1}
Invitational			

^{1}Cancelled due to 9/11

Top 10
Did not play

QF, R16, R32, R64 = Round in which player lost in match play
NT = No tournament

== Senior major championships ==
=== Wins (2) ===
Year	Championship	Winning score	Margin	Runners-up
2003	Ford Senior Players Championship	−17 (67-73-65-66=271)	3 strokes	(United States) Tom Kite, (United States) Jim Thorpe, (United States) Tom Watson
2004	JELD-WEN Tradition	−13 (70-70-68-67=275)	1 stroke	(United States) Allen Doyle, (United States) Jerry Pate

== U.S. national team appearances ==
Amateur

- Walker Cup: 1975 (winners)

Professional

- Ryder Cup: 1983 (winners), 1985
- UBS Cup: 2003 (tie), 2004 (winners)
- Wendy's 3-Tour Challenge (representing Champions Tour): 2003, 2004, 2005 (winners), 2006

== See also ==
- Spring 1976 PGA Tour Qualifying School graduates
- List of golfers with most PGA Tour wins
