= Bill Rogers (golfer) =

American professional golfer (born 1951)

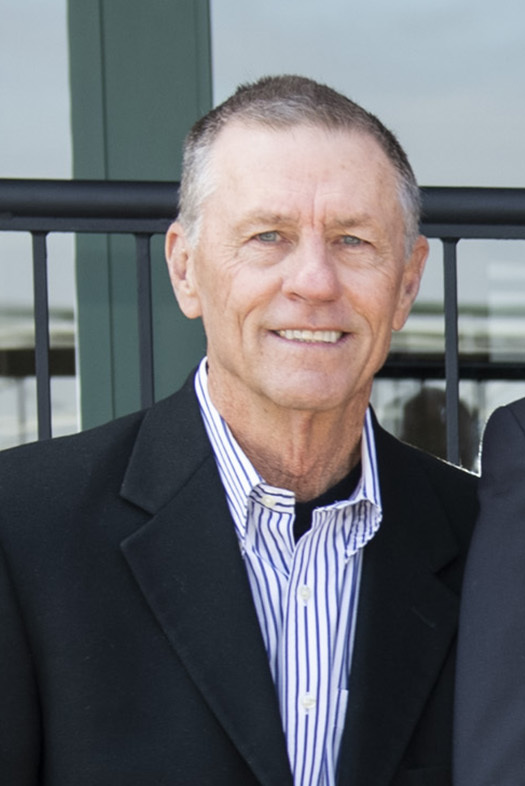
- Rogers in 2022

Personal information
- Full name: William Charles Rogers
- Nickname: Panther
- Nationality: United States
- Born: September 10, 1951 (age 75) Waco, Texas, U.S.
- Height: 6 ft 0 in (1.83 m)
- Weight: 148 lb (67 kg; 10.6 st)

Career
- Sport: Golf
- College: University of Houston
- Turned professional: 1974
- Former tours: PGA Tour; Champions Tour
- Professional wins: 14

Number of wins by tour
- PGA Tour: 6
- European Tour: 1
- Japan Golf Tour: 3
- PGA Tour of Australasia: 2
- Other: 3

Best results in major championships (wins: 1)
- Masters Tournament: T29: 1978
- PGA Championship: T8: 1980
- U.S. Open: T2: 1981
- The Open Championship: Won: 1981

Achievements and awards
- PGA Player of the Year: 1981

William Charles Rogers (born September 10, 1951) is an American professional golfer who is best known as the winner of the 1981 Open Championship.

== Early life ==
Rogers was born in Waco, Texas. He began playing golf at the age of 9. Rogers attended Texas High School in Texarkana, Texas where he excelled on the golf team. He began honing his skills at Northridge Country Club winning numerous local amateur events in northeast Texas. His father was a lieutenant colonel in the United States Air Force, and Rogers spent part of his military brat youth in Morocco and Germany.

== Amateur career ==
Rogers attended the University of Houston, where he played on the Cougar golf team and roomed with fellow future PGA Tour pro Bruce Lietzke. As an amateur golfer, he played for the U.S. in the 1973 Walker Cup.

== Professional career ==
Rogers played the PGA Tour full-time from 1975 to 1988 and won six tournaments, including four in 1981. Almost uniquely for an American golfer, his two most notable victories were in Britain: Rogers won the Suntory World Match Play Championship at Wentworth in 1979, and The Open Championship in 1981 at Royal St George's, four strokes ahead of runner-up Bernhard Langer. He was the PGA Player of the Year for 1981, and finished second on McCormack's World Golf Rankings; he was also on the Ryder Cup team in 1981.

In 1982, Rogers won the PGA Grand Slam of Golf, and led the U.S. Open during the final day before falling short. After one further PGA Tour win in 1983, Rogers' tour career faded to the point where he experienced burnout.

Rogers left the tour in 1988 and took a position as director of golf at San Antonio Country Club, where he worked for 11 years.

Since turning 50 in 2001, Rogers has played sporadically on the Champions Tour; his most notable accomplishment as a senior player was winning the team portion of the 2002 Liberty Mutual Legends of Golf with Bruce Lietzke.

== Personal life ==
Rogers lives in San Antonio, Texas.

== Amateur wins ==
this list may be incomplete

- 1972 Southern Amateur

== Professional wins (14) ==
=== PGA Tour wins (6) ===
Legend
Major championships (1)
Other PGA Tour (5)

No.	Date	Tournament	Winning score	To par	Margin of victory	Runner(s)-up
1	Feb 13, 1978	Bob Hope Desert Classic	69-67-67-67-69=339	−21	2 strokes	(United States) Jerry McGee
2	Mar 29, 1981	Sea Pines Heritage	71-69-68-70=278	−6	1 stroke	(Australia) Bruce Devlin, (United States) Hale Irwin, (United States) Gil Morgan, (United States) Craig Stadler
3	Jul 19, 1981	The Open Championship	72-66-67-71=276	−4	4 strokes	(West Germany) Bernhard Langer
4	Aug 30, 1981	World Series of Golf	68-69-71-67=275	−5	1 stroke	(United States) Tom Kite
5	Oct 4, 1981	Texas Open	67-66-70-63=266	−14	Playoff	(United States) Ben Crenshaw
6	Mar 20, 1983	USF&G Classic	69-67-69-69=274	−14	3 strokes	(United States) David Edwards, (United States) Jay Haas, (United States) Vance Heafner

PGA Tour playoff record (1–2)

No.	Year	Tournament	Opponent	Result
1	1978	Western Open	(United States) Andy Bean	Lost to par on first extra hole
2	1979	Byron Nelson Golf Classic	(United States) Tom Watson	Lost to birdie on first extra hole
3	1981	Texas Open	(United States) Ben Crenshaw	Won with birdie on first extra hole

=== PGA of Japan Tour wins (3) ===
No.	Date	Tournament	Winning score	To par	Margin of victory	Runner(s)-up
1	Oct 9, 1977	Taiheiyo Club Masters	71-67-71-66=275	−9	1 stroke	(United States) Mike Morley, (Japan) Teruo Sugihara
2	Sep 7, 1980	Suntory Open	68-71-70-69=278	−10	2 strokes	(Australia) Graham Marsh
3	Sep 13, 1981	Suntory Open (2)	68-65-68-69=270	−18	2 strokes	(Japan) Norio Suzuki

=== PGA Tour of Australasia wins (2) ===
No.	Date	Tournament	Winning score	To par	Margin of victory	Runner-up
1	Nov 1, 1981	New South Wales Open	69-69-71-76=285	−7	3 strokes	(Australia) Lyndsay Stephen
2	Nov 22, 1981	Australian Open	71-69-69-73=282	−6	1 stroke	(Australia) Greg Norman

=== Other wins (2) ===
No.	Date	Tournament	Winning score	To par	Margin of victory	Runner-up
1	Oct 14, 1979	Suntory World Match Play Championship	1 up			(Japan) Isao Aoki
2	Mar 15, 1982	PGA Grand Slam of Golf	71	+1	5 strokes	(Australia) David Graham

=== Other senior wins (1) ===
- 2002 Liberty Mutual Legends of Golf – Raphael Division (with Bruce Lietzke)

== Major championships ==
=== Wins (1) ===
Year	Championship	54 holes	Winning score	Margin	Runner-up
1981	The Open Championship	5 shot lead	−4 (72-66-67-71=276)	4 strokes	(West Germany) Bernhard Langer

=== Results timeline ===
Tournament	1971	1972	1973	1974	1975	1976	1977	1978	1979
Masters Tournament								T29	
U.S. Open	CUT		CUT		61		CUT	T44	T4
The Open Championship									
PGA Championship							CUT	T42	T35

Tournament	1980	1981	1982	1983	1984	1985	1986
Masters Tournament	T33	T37	T38	CUT	CUT	CUT	CUT
U.S. Open	T16	T2	T3	CUT	57	WD	CUT
The Open Championship	T19	1	T22	T8	CUT	CUT	CUT
PGA Championship	T8	T27	T29	CUT			

Win
Top 10
Did not play

CUT = missed the halfway cut
WD = withdrew
"T" indicates a tie for a place.

=== Summary ===
Tournament	Wins	2nd	3rd	Top-5	Top-10	Top-25	Events	Cuts made
Masters Tournament	0	0	0	0	0	0	8	4
U.S. Open	0	1	1	3	3	4	13	7
The Open Championship	1	0	0	1	2	4	7	4
PGA Championship	0	0	0	0	1	1	7	5
Totals	1	1	1	4	6	9	35	20

- Most consecutive cuts made – 17 (1978 Masters – 1982 PGA)
- Longest streak of top-10s – 2 (1981 U.S. Open – 1981 Open Championship)

== U.S. national team appearances ==
Amateur

- Walker Cup: 1973 (winners)

Professional

- Ryder Cup: 1981 (winners)

== See also ==
- 1974 PGA Tour Qualifying School graduates
