= Triton Financial Classic =

Golf tournament in Austin, Texas

The Triton Financial Classic was a golf tournament on the Champions Tour from 2003 to 2009. It was played annually in Austin, Texas at The Hills Country Club.

The purse for the 2009 tournament was US$1,600,000, with $240,000 going to the winner. The tournament was founded in 2003 as the Kinko's Classic of Austin.

== Winners ==
Triton Financial Classic

- 2009 Bernhard Langer

FedEx Kinko's Classic

- 2008 Denis Watson
- 2007 Scott Hoch
- 2006 Jay Haas
- 2005 Jim Thorpe
- 2004 Larry Nelson

Kinko's Classic of Austin

- 2003 Hale Irwin

== Tournament highlights ==
- 2003: Hale Irwin wins the inaugural edition of the tournament by defeating Tom Watson on the second hole of a sudden death playoff. This in spite of a final round meltdown by Irwin that included his throwing a ball in the creek after making double bogey and, on another hole, he whiffed on a very short putt, and then topped the next.
- 2008: Denis Watson birdies the 54th hole to win by one shot over Nick Price. Price looked to be in command of the tournament until he made double bogey on both the 51st and 52nd holes.
- 2009: Bernhard Langer wins the last edition of the tournament by six shots over Dana Quigley and Mark O'Meara.
