= Hale Irwin =

American professional golfer (born 1945)

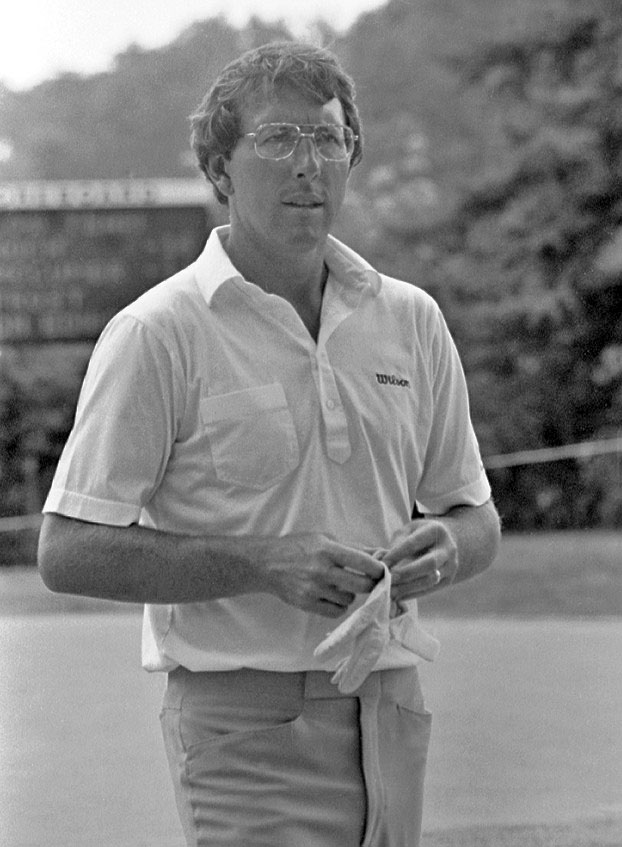
- Irwin in 1986

Personal information
- Full name: Hale S. Irwin
- Nationality: United States
- Born: June 3, 1945 (age 81) Joplin, Missouri, U.S.
- Height: 6 ft 0 in (1.83 m)
- Spouse: Sally Irwin
- Children: 2

Career
- Sport: Golf
- College: University of Colorado
- Turned professional: 1968
- Former tours: PGA Tour; Champions Tour
- Professional wins: 83
- Highest ranking: 7 (May 19, 1991)

Number of wins by tour
- PGA Tour: 20
- European Tour: 3
- Japan Golf Tour: 1
- Sunshine Tour: 1
- PGA Tour of Australasia: 1
- PGA Tour Champions: 45 (2nd all-time)
- Other: 8 (regular); 7 (senior)

Best results in major championships (wins: 3)
- Masters Tournament: T4: 1974, 1975
- PGA Championship: T5: 1975
- U.S. Open: Won: 1974, 1979, 1990
- The Open Championship: T2: 1983

Achievements and awards
- World Golf Hall of Fame: 1992 (member page)
- Senior PGA Tour Rookie of the Year: 1995
- Senior PGA Tour Byron Nelson Award: 1996, 1997, 1998, 2002
- Senior PGA Tour money list winner: 1997, 1998, 2002
- Senior PGA Tour Player of the Year: 1997, 1998, 2002
- Champions Tour Charles Schwab Cup winner: 2002, 2004
- Payne Stewart Award: 2019

Hale S. Irwin (born June 3, 1945) is an American professional golfer. He was one of the world's leading golfers from the mid-1970s to the mid-1980s. He is one of the few players in history to win three U.S. Opens, becoming the oldest ever U.S. Open champion in 1990 at the age of 45. As a senior golfer, Irwin ranks second all-time in PGA Tour Champions victories. He is widely regarded as one of the greatest players in Champions Tour history. He has also developed a career as a golf course architect.

== Early life ==
Irwin was born in Joplin, Missouri, and raised in Baxter Springs, Kansas, and Boulder, Colorado. His father introduced him to the game of golf when he was four years old; he broke 70 for the first time at age fourteen. Irwin was a star athlete in football, baseball, and golf at Boulder High School and graduated in 1963.

== Amateur career ==
Irwin then attended the University of Colorado in Boulder, played football for the Buffaloes under head coach Eddie Crowder, was a two-time All-Big Eight defensive back (1965, 1966), and academic All-American. He won the individual NCAA championship in golf in his senior year in 1967.

== Professional career ==
In 1968, Irwin turned professional. Irwin's first PGA Tour victory was at the 1971 Sea Pines Heritage Classic.

Irwin's first U.S. Open triumph came at Winged Foot in 1974 at the age of 29. In what became known as "The Massacre at Winged Foot", Irwin won with a score of 7-over par, the second-highest winning score in relation to par of any U.S. Open since 1945. The course conditions at Winged Foot in 1974 were described as "brutal". Johnny Miller and several other players suggested that the USGA had intentionally made the Winged Foot course setup particularly treacherous in response to Miller's record-breaking round of 63 at Oakmont the year before. Irwin, however, said in 1974: "I've always enjoyed playing tough courses. It's much more of a challenge to me." Irwin earned $35,000 for his victory at Winged Foot and said that he had a vivid dream three weeks earlier that he won the U.S. Open, which he only told his wife about.

Irwin won the Piccadilly World Match Play Championship at Wentworth Club in 1974 and 1975. He missed out on a record-breaking third straight victory when he was beaten in the 1976 final by Australian David Graham on the second sudden-death playoff hole.

Between January 1975 to the end of the 1978 season, Irwin made the cut in 86 consecutive PGA Tour events. To date, this is the fourth-longest streak of consecutive cuts made on the PGA Tour.

In 1977, Irwin's three wins on the PGA Tour included a five-shot victory in the Colgate Hall of Fame Classic at Pinehurst Resort. Irwin shot a second round of 62 at Pinehurst for a 15-under par opening 36-hole total of 127, which was the best in any PGA Tour event for over a decade.

Irwin's tournament victories kept him ranked high among his peers - he was ranked among the top five in McCormack's World Golf Rankings in every year from 1975 to 1979, inclusive. He ranked in the top-10 of the Official World Golf Rankings for a few weeks in 1991.

Irwin added a second U.S. Open title in 1979 at Inverness Club. With its narrow fairways and heavy rough, the Inverness course was a stern test for the players. Irwin's final round of 75 tied the post-World War II tournament record for the highest final round score by a U.S. Open champion. The next month in The Open Championship at Royal Lytham & St Annes Golf Club, Irwin came to the final round with a two-shot lead. He was bidding to become one of the few golfers in golf history to win the U.S. Open and British Open in the same year. Irwin said in 1979: "I would dearly love to win the British Open. It is special." However, he was thwarted in his attempt at an historic double by the incredible recovery play of Seve Ballesteros.

In 1983, Irwin had another close tilt at The Open Championship, but lost by a shot to Tom Watson at Royal Birkdale, after whiffing on a tiny putt of about an inch, during his third round of play. Irwin said that his mistake, which cost him the chance of a playoff with Watson, was "a mental lapse" and that he learned a lesson from it, later being very careful on short putts.

Irwin later said that the greatest disappointment of his career was not at the British Open, but at the 1984 U.S. Open at Winged Foot Golf Club. Irwin had led the tournament after the first three rounds but shot a final round of 79 to finish 6th. Reflecting on his final round collapse, Irwin said: "A number of factors were in play and it was very emotional. I thought it would be great to win 10 years later at the same venue and, more than anything else, my father was dying of cancer then and I thought it would be wonderful to give him a victory. I destroyed myself with the pressures I'd built up."

After his victory in the 1985 Memorial Tournament, Irwin had occasional top-10 finishes in tournaments for the remainder of the decade but he did not have a further official PGA Tour win until an incredible year in 1990, which was capped by his third U.S. Open victory. In a remarkable tournament, Irwin holed an improbable 45-foot (14 m) birdie putt on the 72nd hole to join a playoff against fellow American Mike Donald. In the 18-hole Monday playoff, Donald was two shots ahead of Irwin with three holes to play. Donald missed a 15-foot par putt on the 18th which would have given him victory. Both men shot rounds of 74 in the playoff and Irwin won the title with a birdie on the first sudden-death playoff hole. After becoming the oldest ever U.S. Open champion at the age of 45, winning his first PGA Tour event for five years, Irwin was gracious in victory. He said of his playoff opponent Mike Donald: "God bless him. I almost wish he had won." The following week, Irwin won the Buick Classic.

During his career, Irwin won professional tournaments on all six continents on which golf is played: Africa, Australia, Asia, Europe, North America and South America. Irwin played on five Ryder Cup teams: 1975, 1977, 1979, 1981, and 1991. He was inducted into the World Golf Hall of Fame in 1992.

Irwin's final PGA Tour win was at the 1994 MCI Heritage Golf Classic. This win at the age of nearly 49 made him one of the oldest winners in Tour history. Overall, he won prize money of just under six million dollars in his career.

Former U.S. Open champion and television analyst Ken Venturi said of Irwin: "Aesthetically and technically, Hale stands at the ball as well as any player I've ever seen."

=== Senior career ===
Irwin qualified to play on the over-50 Senior PGA Tour in 1995, and enjoyed even greater success at this level than he did on the PGA Tour. Through the 2021 season, he is the career leader in wins and earnings with 45 victories and over $26 million. Irwin won three consecutive PGA Seniors' Championships between 1996 and 1998, including a 12-stroke victory in the 1997 tournament, which was the largest ever margin of victory in a 72-hole Champions Tour event until Bernhard Langer's 13-stroke victory in the 2014 Senior Open Championship. Irwin's nine victories in 1997 tied the Senior Tour record set by Peter Thomson in 1985.

Irwin won the U.S. Senior Open in 1998 and 2000 for a career total of five USGA titles. He narrowly missed out on a third U.S. Senior Open title in 2004 when he finished one stroke behind Peter Jacobsen.

Irwin is the oldest player to finish in the top five in a senior major, with a third-place finish at the 2012 Senior PGA Championship at the age of 66. In the 2012 3M Championship, Irwin shot a score under his age for the first time in his career. His round of 65 included an eagle on the 9th hole and six consecutive birdies on the back nine. Irwin has since gone on to shoot his age 44 times in official PGA Tour Champions events (as of August 11, 2020), well ahead of Gary Player's second-place 30. While he has continued to play PGA Tour Champions well into his seventies, he has significantly cut back his tournament schedule, competing in no more than eight tour events in any season since 2015.

In 2000, Irwin was ranked as the 19th greatest golfer of all time by Golf Digest magazine.

== Personal life ==
Irwin is married to wife Sally and has two children. Irwin's son Steve qualified for the 2011 U.S. Open. Steve Irwin said of his father: "I'm very proud of him. The U.S. Open is what truly defined his career. It's been my ultimate goal in golf to play in the U.S. Open since I began competing."

For 25 years, Hale Irwin helped to raise money for the St. Louis Children's Hospital, which named a wing in his honor. Irwin also enjoys hunting and fishing and spending time with his grandchildren. He is the uncle of former CU lineman Heath Irwin.

In 2019, in acknowledgement of his character, sportsmanship and commitment to charity, Irwin received the PGA Tour's Payne Stewart Award presented by Southern Company.

== Amateur wins ==
- 1967 NCAA Division I Championship

== Professional wins (83) ==
=== PGA Tour wins (20) ===
Legend
Major championships (3)
Other PGA Tour (17)

No.	Date	Tournament	Winning score	To par	Margin of victory	Runner(s)-up
1	Nov 28, 1971	Sea Pines Heritage Classic	68-73-68-70=279	−5	1 stroke	(United States) Bob Lunn
2	Sep 16, 1973	Sea Pines Heritage Classic (2)	69-66-65-72=272	−12	5 strokes	(United States) Jerry Heard, (United States) Grier Jones
3	Jun 16, 1974	U.S. Open	73-70-71-73=287	+7	2 strokes	(United States) Forrest Fezler
4	Jun 1, 1975	Atlanta Classic	66-69-68-68=271	−17	4 strokes	(United States) Tom Watson
5	Jun 30, 1975	Western Open	71-68-71-73=283	−1	1 stroke	(South Africa) Bobby Cole
6	Feb 22, 1976	Glen Campbell-Los Angeles Open	69-69-66-68=272	−12	2 strokes	(United States) Tom Watson
7	Mar 7, 1976	Florida Citrus Open	74-66-64-66=270	−18	Playoff	(United States) Kermit Zarley
8	May 29, 1977	Atlanta Classic (2)	70-70-66-67=273	−15	1 stroke	(United States) Steve Veriato
9	Aug 28, 1977	Colgate Hall of Fame Golf Classic	65-62-69-68=264	−20	5 strokes	(United States) Leonard Thompson
10	Oct 16, 1977	San Antonio Texas Open	68-67-64-67=266	−14	2 strokes	(United States) Miller Barber
11	Jun 17, 1979	U.S. Open (2)	74-68-67-75=284	E	2 strokes	(United States) Jerry Pate, (South Africa) Gary Player
12	Feb 14, 1981	Hawaiian Open	68-66-62-69=265	−23	6 strokes	(United States) Don January
13	Aug 23, 1981	Buick Open	65-73-67-72=277	−11	Playoff	(United States) Bobby Clampett, (United States) Peter Jacobsen, (United States) Gil Morgan
14	Mar 14, 1982	Honda Inverrary Classic	65-71-67-66=269	−19	1 stroke	(United States) George Burns, (United States) Tom Kite
15	May 29, 1983	Memorial Tournament	71-71-70-69=281	−7	1 stroke	(United States) Ben Crenshaw, (Australia) David Graham
16	Feb 5, 1984	Bing Crosby National Pro-Am	69-69-68-72=278	−10	Playoff	(Canada) Jim Nelford
17	May 26, 1985	Memorial Tournament (2)	68-68-73-72=281	−7	1 stroke	(United States) Lanny Wadkins
18	Jun 18, 1990	U.S. Open (3)	69-70-74-67=280	−8	Playoff	(United States) Mike Donald
19	Jun 24, 1990	Buick Classic	66-69-68-66=269	−15	2 strokes	(United States) Paul Azinger
20	Apr 17, 1994	MCI Heritage Golf Classic (3)	68-65-65-68=266	−18	2 strokes	(Australia) Greg Norman

PGA Tour playoff record (4–5)

No.	Year	Tournament	Opponent(s)	Result
1	1970	Los Angeles Open	(United States) Billy Casper	Lost to birdie on first extra hole
2	1972	Liggett & Myers Open	(Australia) David Graham, (United States) Lou Graham, (United States) Larry Ziegler	L. Graham won with birdie on third extra hole D. Graham and Ziegler eliminated by par on first hole
3	1976	Florida Citrus Open	(United States) Kermit Zarley	Won with par on sixth extra hole
4	1976	Memorial Tournament	(United States) Roger Maltbie	Lost to birdie on fourth extra hole
5	1981	Bing Crosby National Pro-Am	(United States) John Cook, (United States) Bobby Clampett, (United States) Ben Crenshaw, (United States) Barney Thompson	Cook won with par on third extra hole Clampett, Crenshaw and Thompson eliminated by birdie on first hole
6	1981	Buick Open	(United States) Bobby Clampett, (United States) Peter Jacobsen, (United States) Gil Morgan	Won with birdie on second extra hole
7	1984	Bing Crosby National Pro-Am	(Canada) Jim Nelford	Won with birdie on second extra hole
8	1990	U.S. Open	(United States) Mike Donald	Won with birdie on first extra hole after 18-hole playoff; Irwin: +2 (74), Donald: +2 (74)
9	1991	Memorial Tournament	(United States) Kenny Perry	Lost to birdie on first extra hole

=== PGA of Japan Tour wins (1) ===
No.	Date	Tournament	Winning score	To par	Margin of victory	Runner-up
1	Oct 25, 1981	Bridgestone Tournament	70-65-72-68=275	−13	8 strokes	(United States) Bill Rogers

=== Southern Africa Tour wins (1) ===
No.	Date	Tournament	Winning score	To par	Margin of victory	Runners-up
1	Dec 2, 1978	Lexington PGA Championship	70-69-67-69=275	−9	1 stroke	(South Africa) Hugh Baiocchi, (Rhodesia) Mark McNulty, (South Africa) Robbie Stewart

=== PGA Tour of Australasia wins (1) ===
No.	Date	Tournament	Winning score	To par	Margin of victory	Runner-up
1	Nov 12, 1978	Mayne Nickless Australian PGA Championship	64-75-70-69=278	−6	8 strokes	(Australia) Graham Marsh

=== South American Golf Circuit wins (1) ===
No.	Date	Tournament	Winning score	To par	Margin of victory	Runners-up
1	Nov 21, 1982	Brazil Open	67-67-66-65=265	−7	2 strokes	(Spain) Manuel Calero, (United States) Curtis Strange

=== Other wins (7) ===
No.	Date	Tournament	Winning score	To par	Margin of victory	Runner(s)-up
1	Oct 12, 1974	Piccadilly World Match Play Championship	3 and 1			(South Africa) Gary Player
2	Oct 11, 1975	Piccadilly World Match Play Championship (2)	4 and 2			(United States) Al Geiberger
3	Nov 11, 1979	World Cup (with (United States) John Mahaffey)	141-141-152-141=575	−1	5 strokes	Scotland − Ken Brown and Sandy Lyle
4	Nov 11, 1979	World Cup Individual Trophy	74-70-72-69=285	−3	2 strokes	(West Germany) Bernhard Langer, (Scotland) Sandy Lyle
5	Jan 5, 1986	Bahamas Classic	70-68-64-67=269	−19	6 strokes	(United States) Donnie Hammond
6	Jan 4, 1987	Fila Invitational	69-68-70=207	−9	5 strokes	(United States) Calvin Peete, (United States) Scott Verplank
7	Dec 7, 2003	Office Depot Father/Son Challenge (with son Steve Irwin)	62-61=123	−21	1 stroke	(United States) Jack Nicklaus and son Jack Nicklaus Jr.

Other playoff record (0–1)

No.	Year	Tournament	Opponents	Result
1	2002	Office Depot Father/Son Challenge (with son Steve Irwin)	(United States) Craig Stadler and son Kevin Stadler	Lost to birdie on first extra hole

=== Champions Tour wins (45) ===
Legend
Champions Tour major championships (7)
Tour Championships (1)
Other Champions Tour (37)

No.	Date	Tournament	Winning score	Margin of victory	Runner(s)-up
1	Jul 30, 1995	Ameritech Senior Open	−22 (66-63-66=195)	8 strokes	(United States) Kermit Zarley
2	Oct 1, 1995	Vantage Championship	−17 (66-68-65=199)	4 strokes	(United States) Dave Stockton
3	Feb 25, 1996	American Express Invitational	−19 (66-67-64=197)	5 strokes	(United States) Bob Murphy
4	Apr 21, 1996	PGA Seniors' Championship	−8 (66-74-69-71=280)	2 strokes	(Japan) Isao Aoki
5	Jan 19, 1997	MasterCard Championship	−9 (71-67-69=207)	2 strokes	(United States) Gil Morgan
6	Feb 9, 1997	LG Championship	−15 (70-66-65=201)	1 stroke	(United States) Bob Murphy
7	Apr 20, 1997	PGA Seniors' Championship (2)	−14 (69-65-72-68=274)	12 strokes	(United States) Dale Douglass, (United States) Jack Nicklaus
8	Apr 27, 1997	Las Vegas Senior Classic	−6 (70-65-72=207)	1 stroke	(Japan) Isao Aoki
9	Jul 20, 1997	Burnet Senior Classic	−17 (65-68-66=199)	2 strokes	(United States) Lee Trevino
10	Aug 3, 1997	BankBoston Classic	−13 (70-65-65=200)	2 strokes	(United States) Jerry McGee, (United States) Bob Wynn
11	Sep 14, 1997	Boone Valley Classic	−16 (70-65-65=200)	2 strokes	(United States) Gil Morgan
12	Oct 5, 1997	Vantage Championship (2)	−18 (64-62-69=195)	1 stroke	(United States) Dave Eichelberger
13	Oct 19 1997	Hyatt Regency Maui Kaanapali Classic	−13 (67-63-70=200)	3 strokes	(United States) Mike Hill, (United States) Bruce Summerhays
14	Mar 15, 1998	Toshiba Senior Classic	−13 (70-68-62=200)	1 stroke	(United States) Hubert Green
15	Apr 19, 1998	PGA Seniors' Championship (3)	−13 (68-68-69-70=275)	6 strokes	(United States) Larry Nelson
16	Apr 26, 1998	Las Vegas Senior Classic (2)	−7 (69-67-70-75=281)	1 stroke	(Argentina) Vicente Fernández
17	Jul 19, 1998	Ameritech Senior Open (2)	−15 (62-66-73=201)	3 strokes	(United States) Larry Nelson
18	Jul 26, 1998	U.S. Senior Open	+1 (77-68-71-69=285)	1 stroke	(Argentina) Vicente Fernández
19	Aug 30, 1998	BankBoston Classic (2)	−15 (69-64-68=201)	2 strokes	(United States) Jay Sigel
20	Nov 8, 1998	Energizer Senior Tour Championship	−14 (66-73-70-65=274)	5 strokes	(United States) Gil Morgan
21	May 9, 1999	Nationwide Championship	−10 (69-68-69=206)	1 stroke	(United States) Bob Murphy
22	May 30, 1999	Boone Valley Classic (2)	−13 (68-69-66=203)	2 strokes	(United States) Al Geiberger
23	Jun 27, 1999	Ford Senior Players Championship	−21 (67-71-64-65=267)	7 strokes	(Australia) Graham Marsh
24	Jul 18, 1999	Ameritech Senior Open (3)	−10 (73-66-67=206)	1 stroke	(United States) Bruce Fleisher, (United States) Raymond Floyd, (United States) Gary McCord
25	Jul 25, 1999	Coldwell Banker Burnet Classic (2)	−15 (64-68-69=201)	2 strokes	(United States) Jim Dent, (United States) Dale Douglass
26	May 14, 2000	Nationwide Championship (2)	−9 (71-67-69=207)	1 stroke	(Argentina) Vicente Fernández
27	Jun 4, 2000	BellSouth Senior Classic	−18 (68-65-65=198)	1 stroke	(United States) Gil Morgan
28	Jul 2, 2000	U.S. Senior Open (2)	−17 (66-71-65-65=267)	3 strokes	(United States) Bruce Fleisher
29	Oct 22, 2000	EMC Kaanapali Classic (2)	−18 (71-62-65=198)	4 strokes	(United States) Joe Inman
30	Mar 18, 2001	Siebel Classic in Silicon Valley	−10 (71-70-65=206)	5 strokes	(United States) Allen Doyle, (United States) Tom Watson
31	Apr 28, 2001	Bruno's Memorial Classic	−21 (65-65-65=195)	4 strokes	(Australia) Stewart Ginn
32	Oct 7, 2001	Turtle Bay Championship (3)	−11 (69-68-68=205)	3 strokes	(United States) John Jacobs
33	Feb 10, 2002	ACE Group Classic (2)	−16 (68-64-68=200)	1 stroke	(United States) Tom Watson
34	Mar 10, 2002	Toshiba Senior Classic (2)	−17 (67-64-65=196)	5 strokes	(United States) Allen Doyle
35	Aug 11, 2002	3M Championship (3)	−12 (66-70-68=204)	3 strokes	(United States) Hubert Green
36	Oct 6, 2002	Turtle Bay Championship (4)	−8 (69-69-70=208)	Playoff	(United States) Gary McCord
37	May 19, 2003	Kinko's Classic of Austin	−8 (69-66-73=208)	Playoff	(United States) Tom Watson
38	Oct 12, 2003	Turtle Bay Championship (5)	−8 (68-73-67=208)	2 strokes	(United States) Tom Kite
39	Apr 25, 2004	Liberty Mutual Legends of Golf	−11 (66-68-71=205)	1 stroke	(United States) Gary Koch, (United States) Gil Morgan
40	May 30, 2004	Senior PGA Championship (4)	−8 (67-69-69-71=276)	1 stroke	(United States) Jay Haas
41	Jan 30, 2005	Turtle Bay Championship (6)	−16 (67-66-67=200)	5 strokes	(United States) Dana Quigley
42	Feb 27, 2005	Outback Steakhouse Pro-Am	−8 (72-69-68-67=276)	1 stroke	(United States) Morris Hatalsky, (Republic of Ireland) Mark McNulty
43	Sep 4, 2005	Wal-Mart First Tee Open at Pebble Beach	−13 (66-69-68=203)	1 stroke	(United States) Morris Hatalsky, (United States) Gil Morgan, (United States) Craig Stadler
44	Oct 2, 2005	SAS Championship	−13 (69-68-66=203)	2 strokes	(United States) Bob Gilder, (United States) Tom Jenkins
45	Jan 21, 2007	MasterCard Championship (2)	−23 (66-62-65=193)	5 strokes	(United States) Tom Kite

Champions Tour playoff record (2–6)

No.	Year	Tournament	Opponent	Result
1	1996	Boone Valley Classic	(United States) Gibby Gilbert	Lost to par on first extra hole
2	1999	BankBoston Classic	(United States) Tom McGinnis	Lost to birdie on second extra hole
3	1999	AT&T Canada Senior Open Championship	(United States) Jim Ahern	Lost to par on second extra hole
4	2002	SBC Senior Open	(United States) Bob Gilder	Lost to par on first extra hole
5	2002	Lightpath Long Island Classic	(United States) Hubert Green	Lost to birdie on seventh extra hole
6	2002	Turtle Bay Championship	(United States) Gary McCord	Won with birdie on first extra hole
7	2003	Kinko's Classic of Austin	(United States) Tom Watson	Won with birdie on second extra hole
8	2004	Administaff Small Business Classic	(United States) Larry Nelson	Lost to birdie on first extra hole

=== Other senior wins (7) ===
- 1996 Lexus Challenge (with Sean Connery)
- 1997 Senior Slam at Los Cabos
- 1998 Senior Match Play Challenge
- 1999 Senior Skins Game
- 2000 Our Lucaya Senior Slam
- 2001 Senior Skins Game
- 2002 Senior Skins Game

== Major championships ==
=== Wins (3) ===
Year	Championship	54 holes	Winning score	Margin	Runner(s)-up
1974	U.S. Open	1 shot deficit	+7 (73-70-71-73=287)	2 strokes	(United States) Forrest Fezler
1979	U.S. Open (2)	3 shot lead	E (74-68-67-75=284)	2 strokes	(United States) Jerry Pate, (South Africa) Gary Player
1990	U.S. Open (3)	4 shot deficit	−8 (69-70-74-67=280)	Playoff^{1}	(United States) Mike Donald

^{1}Defeated Mike Donald with a birdie on the 19th hole after they were tied at 74 (+2) in an 18-hole playoff.

=== Results timeline ===
Tournament	1966	1967	1968	1969
Masters Tournament				
U.S. Open	T61			
The Open Championship				
PGA Championship				

Tournament	1970	1971	1972	1973	1974	1975	1976	1977	1978	1979
Masters Tournament		T13	CUT		T4	T4	T5	5	8	T23
U.S. Open		T19	T36	T20	1	T3	T26	T41	T4	1
The Open Championship					T24	9	T32	T46	T24	6
PGA Championship	T31	T22	T11	T9		T5	T34	T44	T12	CUT

Tournament	1980	1981	1982	1983	1984	1985	1986	1987	1988	1989
Masters Tournament	CUT	T25	CUT	T6	T21	T36	CUT			
U.S. Open	T8	T58	T39	T39	6	14	CUT	CUT	T17	T54
The Open Championship				T2	T14					
PGA Championship	T30	T16	T42	T14	T25	T32	T26		T38	

Tournament	1990	1991	1992	1993	1994	1995	1996	1997	1998	1999
Masters Tournament		T10	47	T27	T18	T14	T29			
U.S. Open	1	T11	T51	T62	T18	CUT	T50	T52	CUT	WD
The Open Championship	T53	T57	T19							
PGA Championship	T12	T73	T66	T6	T39	T54		T29		T41

Tournament	2000	2001	2002	2003	2004
Masters Tournament					
U.S. Open	T27	T52	CUT	WD	
The Open Championship					
PGA Championship					CUT

Win
Top 10
Did not play

CUT = missed the halfway cut
WD = withdrew
"T" indicates a tie for a place.

=== Summary ===
Tournament	Wins	2nd	3rd	Top-5	Top-10	Top-25	Events	Cuts made
Masters Tournament	0	0	0	4	7	13	21	17
U.S. Open	3	0	1	5	7	13	34	27
The Open Championship	0	1	0	1	3	7	11	11
PGA Championship	0	0	0	1	3	10	26	24
Totals	3	1	1	11	20	43	92	79

- Most consecutive cuts made – 26 (1972 U.S. Open – 1979 Open Championship)
- Longest streak of top-10s – 5 (1975 Masters – 1976 Masters)

== Results in The Players Championship ==
Tournament	1974	1975	1976	1977	1978	1979	1980	1981	1982	1983	1984	1985	1986	1987	1988	1989	1990	1991	1992	1993	1994	1995	1996
The Players Championship	T34	7	T17	T3	T42	CUT	T14	T51	T19	T49	T15	T5	CUT	T24	CUT	CUT	T5	T27	CUT	CUT	4	T55	T46

Top 10

CUT = missed the halfway cut
"T" indicates a tie for a place

== Senior major championships ==
=== Wins (7) ===
Year	Championship	Winning score	Margin	Runner(s)-up
1996	PGA Seniors' Championship	−8 (66-74-69-71=280)	2 strokes	(Japan) Isao Aoki
1997	PGA Seniors' Championship (2)	−14 (69-65-72-68=274)	12 strokes	(United States) Dale Douglass, (United States) Jack Nicklaus
1998	PGA Seniors' Championship (3)	−13 (68-68-69-70=275)	7 strokes	(United States) Larry Nelson
1998	U.S. Senior Open	+1 (77-68-71-69=285)	1 stroke	(Argentina) Vicente Fernández
1999	Ford Senior Players Championship	−21 (67-71-64-65=267)	7 strokes	(Australia) Graham Marsh
2000	U.S. Senior Open (2)	−17 (66-71-65-65=267)	3 strokes	(United States) Bruce Fleisher
2004	Senior PGA Championship (4)	−8 (67-69-69-71=276)	1 stroke	(United States) Jay Haas

=== Results timeline ===
Results not in chronological order before 2017.

Tournament	1995	1996	1997	1998	1999	2000	2001	2002
The Tradition	–	2	T13	4	T20	T37	3	6
Senior PGA Championship	–	1	1	1	T11	T2	T5	T2
U.S. Senior Open	T5	2	T5	1	T3	1	T11	T11
Senior Players Championship	T10	2	T19	2	1	T4	3	T6

Tournament	2003	2004	2005	2006	2007	2008	2009	2010	2011	2012	2013	2014	2015	2016	2017	2018
The Tradition	T10	13	T42	T32	T52	T41	T38	T50	T45	T53	T54	T72		80		
Senior PGA Championship	T15	1	T46	T23	T42	CUT	T59	T65	4	3	T56	T67	CUT		CUT	
U.S. Senior Open		2	25	T32	CUT	T40	T32	CUT	T4	CUT	T56	CUT	70	CUT	CUT	CUT
Senior Players Championship	T12	T9	2		T7	T27	T15	T41	T45	T30	T68	T75	T57			T68
Senior Open Championship				T13												CUT

The Senior Open Championship was not a senior major until 2003.

Win
Top 10
Did not play

CUT = missed the halfway cut
"T" indicates a tie for a place

== U.S. national team appearances ==
This list may be incomplete.
Professional

- Ryder Cup: 1975 (winners), 1977 (winners), 1979 (winners), 1981 (winners), 1991 (winners)
- Presidents Cup: 1994 (winners, playing captain)
- World Cup: 1974, 1979 (winners, individual winner)
- UBS Cup: 2001 (winners), 2002 (winners), 2003 (tie), 2004 (winners)
- Wendy's 3-Tour Challenge (representing Champions Tour): 1995 (winners), 1996, 1998 (winners), 1999 (winners), 2000, 2003, 2005 (winners)

== See also ==
- Spring 1968 PGA Tour Qualifying School graduates
- List of golfers with most PGA Tour wins
- List of golfers with most PGA Tour Champions wins
- List of golfers with most Champions Tour major championship wins
