= 1986 Masters Tournament =

Golf tournament held in 1986

- Front cover of the 1986 Masters Guide

Tournament information
- Dates: April 10–13, 1986
- Location: Augusta, Georgia; 33.503°N 82.020°W
- Course: Augusta National Golf Club
- Organized by: Augusta National Golf Club
- Tour: PGA Tour

Statistics
- Par: 72
- Length: 6,905 yards (6,314 m)
- Field: 88 players, 48 after cut
- Cut: 149 (+5)
- Prize fund: $785,000
- Winner's share: $144,000

Champion
- (United States) Jack Nicklaus
- 279 (−9)

Location map
- Location in the United States Location in Georgia

The 1986 Masters Tournament was the 50th Masters Tournament, held April 10–13 at the Augusta National Golf Club in Augusta, Georgia.

Jack Nicklaus won his record 18th and final professional major with a historic one-stroke victory. He shot a final round 65 (−7), with a back nine of 30 (−6), for a total score of 279 (−9). At age 46, he became the oldest winner of the Masters and the second-oldest winner of any major championship, behind Julius Boros, who was 48 when he captured the PGA Championship in 1968 (until they were both passed by Phil Mickelson when he won the 2021 PGA Championship aged 50). The win also gave Nicklaus a record six Masters victories, the first in 1963, less than ten months after his first major win at the 1962 U.S. Open. The 23-year span of Masters victories and 24-year span of major victories are also records. The runners-up were Tom Kite and Greg Norman, whose near-misses at the Masters are also noteworthy. The winner's share was $144,000, more than seven times what Nicklaus earned for his first Augusta win.

== Course ==
Hole	Name	Yards	Par	Hole	Name	Yards	Par
1	Tea Olive	400	4	10	Camellia	485	4
2	Pink Dogwood	555	5	11	White Dogwood	455	4
3	Flowering Peach	360	4	12	Golden Bell	155	3
4	Flowering Crab Apple	205	3	13	Azalea	465	5
5	Magnolia	435	4	14	Chinese Fir	405	4
6	Juniper	180	3	15	Firethorn	500	5
7	Pampas	360	4	16	Redbud	170	3
8	Yellow Jasmine	535	5	17	Nandina	400	4
9	Carolina Cherry	435	4	18	Holly	405	4
Out		3,465	36	In		3,440	36
Source:				Total		6,905	72

== Field ==
1. Masters champions

Tommy Aaron, George Archer, Seve Ballesteros (3,8,9), Gay Brewer, Billy Casper, Charles Coody, Ben Crenshaw, Raymond Floyd (4,8,11,12,13), Doug Ford, Bob Goalby, Bernhard Langer (8,11,12), Jack Nicklaus (8), Arnold Palmer, Gary Player, Craig Stadler (8,12,13), Tom Watson (2,3,8,10,12), Fuzzy Zoeller (2,9,11,12,13)

- Jack Burke Jr., Ralph Guldahl, Claude Harmon, Ben Hogan, Herman Keiser, Cary Middlecoff, Byron Nelson, Henry Picard, Gene Sarazen, Sam Snead and Art Wall Jr. did not play.

The following categories only apply to Americans

2. U.S. Open champions (last five years)

Larry Nelson (4)

- Andy North (9,12,13) did not play.

3. The Open champions (last five years)

Bill Rogers

4. PGA champions (last five years)

Hubert Green (10,12,13), Hal Sutton (11,12,13), Lee Trevino (8,10)

5. 1985 U.S. Amateur semi-finalists

Chip Drury (a), Peter Persons (a), Sam Randolph (6,7,8,a)

6. Previous two U.S. Amateur and Amateur champions

Scott Verplank (7,11,a)

7. Members of the 1985 U.S. Walker Cup team

Bob Lewis (a), Jay Sigel (a), Michael Podolak (a), Randy Sonnier (a)

- Clark Burroughs, Jerry Haas, Davis Love III, and Duffy Waldorf forfeited their exemptions by turning professional.

8. Top 24 players and ties from the 1985 Masters Tournament

Fred Couples (10), Jay Haas (9), Gary Hallberg, Billy Kratzert, Gary Koch, Wayne Levi (11,12), Bruce Lietzke, John Mahaffey (11,12), Mark McCumber, Mark O'Meara (9,12,13), Tim Simpson (11), Curtis Strange (11,12,13), Jim Thorpe (11,12), Lanny Wadkins (9,11,12,13)

9. Top 16 players and ties from the 1985 U.S. Open

Andy Bean (10,11), Rick Fehr, Hale Irwin (11), Tom Kite (11,12,13), Johnny Miller, Corey Pavin (11,12), Don Pooley, Jack Renner (12), Tony Sills, Scott Simpson, Joey Sindelar (11,12), Payne Stewart (12)

10. Top eight players and ties from 1985 PGA Championship

Buddy Gardner

11. Winners of PGA Tour events since the previous Masters

Phil Blackmar (12), George Burns (12), Bob Eastwood, Danny Edwards (12), Dan Forsman, Bill Glasson (12), Ken Green, Donnie Hammond, Kenny Knox, Roger Maltbie (12), Calvin Peete (12,13), Doug Tewell, Bob Tway, Mark Wiebe

12. Top 30 players from the 1985 PGA Tour money list

Peter Jacobsen (13), Larry Mize, Mac O'Grady, Dan Pohl, Larry Rinker

13. Members of the U.S. 1985 Ryder Cup team

14. Foreign invitations

Isao Aoki (8), Dave Barr (9), Chen Tze-chung (9), Chen Tze-ming (10), David Graham (2,8), Jack Kay Jr. (5,a), Sandy Lyle (3,11), Garth McGimpsey (6,a), Tsuneyuki Nakajima, Greg Norman (9), Nick Price (10), Denis Watson (9)

- Numbers in brackets indicate categories that the player would have qualified under had they been American.

== Round summaries ==
=== First round ===
Thursday, April 10, 1986

Place	Player	Score	To par
T1	(United States) Ken Green	68	−4
T1	(United States) Billy Kratzert	68	−4
T3	(Taiwan) Chen Tze-chung	69	−3
T3	(United States) Gary Koch	69	−3
T5	(Canada) Dave Barr	70	−2
T5	(Japan) Tsuneyuki Nakajima	70	−2
T5	(Australia) Greg Norman	70	−2
T5	(United States) Tom Kite	70	−2
T5	(United States) Bob Tway	70	−2
T5	(United States) Tom Watson	70	−2

=== Second round ===
Friday, April 11, 1986

Place	Player	Score	To par
1	(Spain) Seve Ballesteros	71-68=139	−5
2	(United States) Billy Kratzert	68-72=140	−4
3	(Japan) Tsuneyuki Nakajima	70-71=141	−3
T4	(Taiwan) Chen Tze-chung	69-73=142	−2
T4	(United States) Ben Crenshaw	71-71=142	−2
T4	(United States) Danny Edwards	71-71=142	−2
T4	(Australia) Greg Norman	70-72=142	−2
T4	(West Germany) Bernhard Langer	74-68=142	−2
T9	(United States) Gary Koch	69-74=143	−1
T9	(United States) Mark McCumber	76-67=143	−1
T9	(United States) Corey Pavin	71-72=143	−1
T9	(United States) Bob Tway	70-73=143	−1

=== Third round ===
Saturday, April 12, 1986

Place	Player	Score	To par
1	(Australia) Greg Norman	70-72-68=210	−6
T2	(Spain) Seve Ballesteros	71-68-72=211	−5
T2	(West Germany) Bernhard Langer	74-68-69=211	−5
T2	(United States) Donnie Hammond	73-71-67=211	−5
T2	(Zimbabwe) Nick Price	79-69-63=211	−5
T6	(Japan) Tsuneyuki Nakajima	70-71-71=212	−4
T6	(United States) Tom Kite	70-74-68=212	−4
T6	(United States) Tom Watson	70-74-68=212	−4
T9	(United States) Danny Edwards	71-71-72=214	−2
T9	(United States) Gary Koch	69-74-71=214	−2
T9	(Scotland) Sandy Lyle	76-70-68=214	−2
T9	(United States) Mark McCumber	76-67-71=214	−2
T9	(United States) Jack Nicklaus	74-71-69=214	−2
T9	(United States) Corey Pavin	71-72-71=214	−2
T9	(United States) Bob Tway	70-73-71=214	−2

=== Final round ===
Sunday, April 13, 1986

==== Summary ====
External videos
- Full final round coverage on CBS on YouTube

In one of the most memorable and exciting final rounds in Masters history, five different players held at least a share of the lead in the final round. Seve Ballesteros gained a share of the lead on the front 9 helped by a hole-out eagle at 8. Jack Nicklaus played his first eight holes in even par, but stormed into contention with birdies at 9, 10 and 11. However, Nicklaus bogeyed the 12th to fall three behind the leaders. Greg Norman, tied for the lead at −7 as he made the turn, double-bogeyed the 10th hole to give Ballesteros the outright lead by one shot over Tom Kite. Ballesteros hit his second shot at 13 to within six feet. After Kite lagged up his own eagle putt on 13, Ballesteros holed his putt for his second eagle of the day and a three shot lead over Kite. Kite then holed his birdie putt to cut the lead back to two.

After a par at 14, Nicklaus began his legendary charge at 15. After hitting his 214-yard (196 m) approach to 12 feet (3.7 m), he buried the putt for eagle to pull within two shots of Ballesteros. Nicklaus then hit his tee shot on 16 to within 3 feet and after holing his birdie putt he was within one shot of Ballesteros who was playing the 15th hole. Ballesteros, who was in prime position to go for the green in two, pull hooked his approach into the water. Failing to get up and down, Ballesteros bogeyed the hole, giving Nicklaus a share of the lead. Kite made birdie at 15 to enter into a three-way tie with Ballesteros and Nicklaus. After a wayward drive, Nicklaus hit his approach on 17 to 18 feet (5.5 m). After long deliberation, he holed his putt on 17 for sole possession of the lead for the first time in the tournament. He two-putted for par on 18 to post −9 and a one shot lead.

Ballesteros three-putted the 17th to fall out of contention, but Kite had 12 feet for birdie on 18 to tie Nicklaus. Kite barely missed his putt on the low side to miss a playoff by one shot. Norman, left for dead after his double-bogey on 10, birdied 14, 15 and 16 to pull within one shot of the lead. After hooking his drive way left on 17, Norman made an incredible shot between two pines to within eight feet. Norman buried the birdie putt, his fourth straight, to tie for the lead. Norman then hit a perfect drive on 18, needing birdie for his first major championship. However, Norman pushed his approach shot into the gallery and subsequently missed his 15-foot (4.6 m) par putt to finish one stroke behind. Nicklaus had stormed back, shooting 30 on the back nine, to win his sixth Masters title and became the oldest Masters champion at age 46.

Both Ballesteros and Norman stated the most regretful shots of their careers were during the final round of the 1986 Masters. For Ballesteros it was his approach shot to the 15th hole and for Norman his approach shot to the 18th.

==== Final leaderboard ====
Champion
Silver Cup winner (low amateur)
(a) = amateur
(c) = past champion

Top 10
Place	Player	Score	To par	Money (US$)
1	(United States) Jack Nicklaus (c)	74-71-69-65=279	−9	144,000
T2	(United States) Tom Kite	70-74-68-68=280	−8	70,400
T2	(Australia) Greg Norman	70-72-68-70=280	−8	70,400
4	(Spain) Seve Ballesteros (c)	71-68-72-70=281	−7	38,400
5	(Zimbabwe) Nick Price	79-69-63-71=282	−6	32,000
T6	(United States) Jay Haas	76-69-71-67=283	−5	27,800
T6	(United States) Tom Watson (c)	70-74-68-71=283	−5	27,800
T8	(Japan) Tsuneyuki Nakajima	70-71-71-72=284	−4	23,200
T8	(United States) Payne Stewart	75-71-69-69=284	−4	23,200
T8	(United States) Bob Tway	70-73-71-70=284	−4	23,200

Leaderboard below the top 10
Place	Player	Score	To par	Money ($)
T11	(United States) Donnie Hammond	73-71-67-74=285	−3	16,960
T11	(Scotland) Sandy Lyle	76-70-68-71=285	−3	16,960
T11	(United States) Mark McCumber	76-67-71-71=285	−3	16,960
T11	(United States) Corey Pavin	71-72-71-71=285	−3	16,960
T11	(United States) Calvin Peete	75-71-69-70=285	−3	16,960
T16	(Canada) Dave Barr	70-77-71-68=286	−2	12,000
T16	(United States) Ben Crenshaw (c)	71-71-74-70=286	−2	12,000
T16	(United States) Gary Koch	69-74-71-72=286	−2	12,000
T16	(West Germany) Bernhard Langer (c)	74-68-69-75=286	−2	12,000
T16	(United States) Larry Mize	75-74-72-65=286	−2	12,000
T21	(United States) Curtis Strange	73-74-68-72=287	−1	9,300
T21	(United States) Fuzzy Zoeller (c)	73-73-69-72=287	−1	9,300
T23	(Taiwan) Chen Tze-chung	69-73-75-71=288	E	8,000
T23	(United States) Roger Maltbie	71-75-69-73=288	E	8,000
T25	(United States) Bill Glasson	72-74-72-71=289	+1	6,533
T25	(United States) Peter Jacobsen	75-73-68-73=289	+1	6,533
T25	(United States) Scott Simpson	76-72-67-74=289	+1	6,533
T28	(United States) Danny Edwards	71-71-72-76=290	+2	5,667
T28	(Australia) David Graham	76-72-74-68=290	+2	5,667
T28	(United States) Johnny Miller	74-70-77-69=290	+2	5,667
T31	(United States) Fred Couples	72-77-70-72=291	+3	4,875
T31	(United States) Bruce Lietzke	78-70-68-75=291	+3	4,875
T31	(United States) Dan Pohl	76-70-72-73=291	+3	4,875
T31	(United States) Lanny Wadkins	78-71-73-69=291	+3	4,875
35	(United States) Wayne Levi	73-76-67-76=292	+4	4,300
T36	(United States) Rick Fehr	75-74-69-75=293	+5	3,850
T36	(United States) Hubert Green	71-75-73-74=293	+5	3,850
T36	(United States) Larry Nelson	73-73-71-76=293	+5	3,850
T36	(United States) Sam Randolph (a)	75-73-72-73=293	+5	0
T36	(United States) Tony Sills	76-73-73-71=293	+5	3,850
41	(United States) Don Pooley	77-72-73-72=294	+6	3,400
T42	(United States) Billy Kratzert	68-72-76-79=295	+7	3,200
T42	(United States) John Mahaffey	79-69-72-75=295	+7	3,200
44	(United States) Ken Green	68-78-74-76=296	+8	3,000
T45	(United States) Phil Blackmar	76-73-73-76=298	+10	2,700
T45	(United States) Jim Thorpe	74-74-73-77=298	+10	2,700
47	(United States) Lee Trevino	76-73-73-77=299	+11	2,500
48	(United States) Mark O'Meara	74-73-81-73=301	+13	2,300
CUT	(South Africa) Gary Player (c)	77-73=150	+6	
CUT	(United States) Craig Stadler (c)	74-76=150	+6	
CUT	(United States) Andy Bean	75-76=151	+7	
CUT	(United States) Bob Eastwood	79-72=151	+7	
CUT	(United States) Buddy Gardner	74-77=151	+7	
CUT	(United States) Gary Hallberg	78-73=151	+7	
CUT	(United States) Kenny Knox	75-76=151	+7	
CUT	(United States) George Burns	74-78=152	+8	
CUT	(United States) Raymond Floyd (c)	74-78=152	+8	
CUT	(United States) Dan Forsman	78-74=152	+8	
CUT	(United States) Hale Irwin	76-76=152	+8	
CUT	(United States) Bob Lewis (a)	74-78=152	+8	
CUT	(United States) Mac O'Grady	82-70=152	+8	
CUT	(United States) Jay Sigel (a)	74-78=152	+8	
CUT	(United States) Joey Sindelar	79-73=152	+8	
CUT	(United States) Hal Sutton	80-72=152	+8	
CUT	(United States) Gay Brewer (c)	77-76=153	+9	
CUT	(United States) Billy Casper (c)	78-75=153	+9	
CUT	(United States) Charles Coody (c)	76-77=153	+9	
CUT	(United States) Chip Drury (a)	76-77=153	+9	
CUT	(United States) Peter Persons (a)	76-77=153	+9	
CUT	(United States) Jack Renner	76-77=153	+9	
CUT	(Canada) Jack Kay Jr. (a)	80-74=154	+10	
CUT	(United States) Larry Rinker	73-81=154	+10	
CUT	(United States) Doug Tewell	74-80=154	+10	
CUT	(United States) Scott Verplank (a)	77-77=154	+10	
CUT	(United States) Mark Wiebe	76-78=154	+10	
CUT	(United States) George Archer (c)	75-80=155	+11	
CUT	(United States) Tommy Aaron (c)	79-77=156	+12	
CUT	(Japan) Isao Aoki	79-77=156	+12	
CUT	(United States) Doug Ford (c)	78-78=156	+12	
CUT	(Northern Ireland) Garth McGimpsey (a)	78-78=156	+12	
CUT	(United States) Arnold Palmer (c)	80-76=156	+12	
CUT	(United States) Michael Podolak (a)	82-74=156	+12	
CUT	(United States) Bill Rogers	80-76=156	+12	
CUT	(Zimbabwe) Denis Watson	80-76=156	+12	
CUT	(United States) Tim Simpson	78-79=157	+13	
CUT	(United States) Randy Sonnier (a)	81-77=158	+14	
CUT	(Taiwan) Chen Tze-ming	79-81=160	+16	
CUT	(United States) Bob Goalby (c)	79-81=160	+16	

==== Scorecard ====
Hole	1	2	3	4	5	6	7	8	9	10	11	12	13	14	15	16	17	18
Par	4	5	4	3	4	3	4	5	4	4	4	3	5	4	5	3	4	4
(United States) Nicklaus	−2	−3	−3	−2	−2	−2	−2	−2	−3	−4	−5	−4	−5	−5	−7	−8	−9	−9
(United States) Kite	−3	−4	−3	−3	−3	−3	−3	−5	−5	−5	−6	−6	−7	−7	−8	−8	−8	−8
(Australia) Norman	−6	−6	−6	−6	−6	−7	−7	−7	−7	−5	−5	−5	−5	−6	−7	−8	−9	−8
(Spain) Ballesteros	−5	−5	−5	−5	−5	−5	−6	−8	−7	−7	−7	−7	−9	−9	−8	−8	−7	−7
(Zimbabwe) Price	−5	−5	−4	−5	−5	−5	−5	−5	−4	−5	−4	−4	−4	−5	−6	−6	−6	−6
(United States) Watson	−4	−4	−4	−4	−4	−3	−3	−3	−3	−3	−3	−3	−4	−5	−6	−6	−6	−5
(Japan) Nakajima	−4	−5	−5	−4	−4	−3	−3	−3	−3	−3	−3	−3	−3	−3	−4	−4	−4	−4
(United States) Hammond	−4	−5	−4	−4	−3	−3	−2	−1	−1	−1	−1	−1	−2	−2	−3	−3	−3	−3
(West Germany) Langer	−5	−6	−6	−6	−6	−6	−5	−4	−4	−4	−4	−4	−4	−4	−4	−4	−4	−2

Cumulative tournament scores, relative to par

Eagle	Birdie	Bogey	Double bogey

== Tournament notes ==
- Jack Nicklaus increased his record for most Masters wins to six, and most major championship wins to 18.
- Nicklaus became (and remains) the oldest winner of a Masters at 46 years, 82 days; the previous oldest was Gary Player at 42 in 1978.
- Nicklaus tied the course record with a 30 on the second nine in the final round, while Nick Price shot a 30 on the second nine a day earlier (tied with four others). Nicklaus' 30 included a bogey, at the par-3 12th. The record for the back nine is now 29, set in the fourth round in 1992 by Mark Calcavecchia, and tied by David Toms in the fourth round in 1998.
- Gary Koch won the Par 3 contest with a score of 23 (−4); he tied for 16th at 286 (−2)
- Nick Price set a course record with his third-round 63 (−9), later tied by Greg Norman in the first round in 1996.
  - The previous course record of 64 was set by Lloyd Mangrum in 1940.
- Price set a single-round record at Augusta with ten birdies in round 3; the record is now eleven birdies (Anthony Kim, second round, 2009).
- Sam Randolph was low amateur for the second consecutive year.

== Quotes ==
- "Yes sir! The battle is joined. My goodness. There is life in the old Bear yet." – Ben Wright's (CBS Sports) call as Nicklaus sank his eagle putt on the 15th hole to pull within two shots of the lead.
- "And there's no doubt about it, the Bear has come out of hibernation." – Jim Nantz's (CBS Sports) call as Nicklaus sank his 3-foot birdie putt on the 16th hole to pull within one shot of the lead.
- "Oh he's pulled it! Oh he has pull hooked that! That's destined for the water! And the foreign invasion is reeling under the Bear's attack!" – Ben Wright's call as Ballesteros pulled his second shot into the water at 15.
- "Maybe... Yes sir!" – Verne Lundquist's (CBS Sports) call as Nicklaus made his 18-foot (5 m) birdie putt on the 17th hole to take sole possession of the lead for the first time in the tournament.
