= 1988 Players Championship =

Tournament information
- Dates: March 24–27, 1988
- Location: Ponte Vedra Beach, Florida; 30.198°N 81.394°W
- Courses: TPC Sawgrass, Stadium Course
- Tour: PGA Tour

Statistics
- Par: 72
- Length: 6,857 yards (6,270 m)
- Field: 144 players, 72 after cut
- Cut: 146 (+2)
- Prize fund: $1.25 million
- Winner's share: $225,000

Champion
- (United States) Mark McCumber
- 273 (−15)

Location map
- Location in the United States Location in Florida

The 1988 Players Championship was a golf tournament in Florida on the PGA Tour, held March 24–27 at TPC Sawgrass in Ponte Vedra Beach, southeast of Jacksonville. It was the fifteenth Players Championship and the first without "Tournament" in the title.

Local resident Mark McCumber opened with 65 and won with 273 (−15), four strokes ahead of runner-up Mike Reid. McCumber's 72-hole score at the Stadium Course set a record; it was equaled in 1992 and broken in 1993.

Jay Haas was disqualified on Thursday after playing with a bent putter. Davis Love III had a similar occurrence on Friday, while Curtis Strange reported that he signed an incorrect scorecard. (Strange won the next two U.S. Opens.)

Weather delays on Saturday caused the leaders to complete only a few holes of the third round; play was resumed early on Sunday morning.

Defending champion Sandy Lyle missed the 36-hole cut by six strokes, and the purse was increased 25% this year to $1.25 million.

== Venue ==
This was the seventh Players Championship held at the TPC at Sawgrass Stadium Course and it remained at 6,857 yards (6,270 m).

== Field ==
Fulton Allem, Isao Aoki, Paul Azinger, Seve Ballesteros, Dave Barr, Andy Bean, Chip Beck, Ronnie Black, Phil Blackmar, Jay Don Blake, Ken Brown, George Burns, Curt Byrum, Tom Byrum, Mark Calcavecchia, Jim Carter, Chen Tze-chung, Bobby Clampett, Keith Clearwater, Lennie Clements, Russ Cochran, John Cook, Fred Couples, Ben Crenshaw, Rodger Davis, Mike Donald, Ed Dougherty, Bob Eastwood, Danny Edwards, David Edwards, Dave Eichelberger, Steve Elkington, Brad Fabel, Nick Faldo, Brad Faxon, Rick Fehr, Ed Fiori, Raymond Floyd, Dan Forsman, David Frost, Buddy Gardner, Bob Gilder, Bill Glasson, Wayne Grady, David Graham, Hubert Green, Ken Green, Jay Haas, Gary Hallberg, Dan Halldorson, Donnie Hammond, Morris Hatalsky, Mark Hayes, Vance Heafner, Lon Hinkle, Scott Hoch, Mike Hulbert, John Huston, John Inman, Hale Irwin, David Ishii, Peter Jacobsen, Steve Jones, Tom Kite, Kenny Knox, Gary Koch, Billy Kratzert, Bernhard Langer, Wayne Levi, Bruce Lietzke, Bob Lohr, Davis Love III, Mark Lye, Sandy Lyle, Andrew Magee, John Mahaffey, Roger Maltbie, Dick Mast, Blaine McCallister, Mike McCullough, Mark McCumber, Pat McGowan, Rocco Mediate, Johnny Miller, Larry Mize, Gil Morgan, Jodie Mudd, Tsuneyuki Nakajima, Larry Nelson, Jack Nicklaus, Greg Norman, Andy North, Mac O'Grady, Mark O'Meara, David Ogrin, Akiyoshi Ohmachi, Steve Pate, Corey Pavin, Calvin Peete, Chris Perry, Kenny Perry, Dan Pohl, Don Pooley, Nick Price, Tom Purtzer, Sam Randolph, Mike Reid, Jack Renner, Larry Rinker, Loren Roberts, Bill Rogers, Clarence Rose, Dave Rummells, Bill Sander, Gene Sauers, Tom Sieckmann, Tony Sills, Scott Simpson, Tim Simpson, Joey Sindelar, Jeff Sluman, J. C. Snead, Craig Stadler, Payne Stewart, Ray Stewart, Curtis Strange, Mike Sullivan, Hal Sutton, Doug Tewell, Leonard Thompson, Bob Tway, Howard Twitty, Bobby Wadkins, Lanny Wadkins, Fred Wadsworth, Denis Watson, Tom Watson, D. A. Weibring, Mark Wiebe, Willie Wood, Ian Woosnam, Robert Wrenn, Fuzzy Zoeller, Richard Zokol

== Round summaries ==
=== First round ===
Thursday, March 24, 1988

Place	Player	Score	To par
1	(United States) Mark McCumber	65	−7
T2	(United States) Curt Byrum	66	−6
T2	(Australia) Greg Norman	66	−6
T4	(United States) Ed Fiori	67	−5
T4	(South Africa) David Frost	67	−5
T4	(United States) Tom Kite	67	−5
T4	(United States) John Mahaffey	67	−5
T4	(United States) David Ogrin	67	−5
T4	(United States) Fuzzy Zoeller	67	−5
T10	(United States) Donnie Hammond	68	−4
T10	(United States) Mike Reid	68	−4

=== Second round ===
Friday, March 25, 1988

Place	Player	Score	To par
1	(United States) Payne Stewart	71-65=136	−8
T2	(United States) Mark McCumber	65-72=137	−7
T2	(United States) Mike Reid	68-69=137	−7
T4	(South Africa) David Frost	67-71=138	−6
T4	(United States) Morris Hatalsky	70-68=138	−6
T4	(United States) Dan Pohl	69-69=138	−6
T7	(United States) Curt Byrum	66-73=139	−5
T7	(United States) Gil Morgan	69-70=139	−5
T7	(United States) Calvin Peete	70-69=139	−5
T7	(United States) Chip Beck	73-67=140	−4
T7	(United States) Ben Crenshaw	69-71=140	−4
T7	(United States) Ed Fiori	67-73=140	−4
T7	(United States) Tom Kite	67-73=140	−4
T7	(United States) Dick Mast	70-70=140	−4
T7	(Australia) Greg Norman	66-74=140	−4

=== Third round ===
Saturday, March 26, 1988
Sunday, March 27, 1988

Due to weather delays, McCumber completed the last fourteen holes of his third round on Sunday morning and went to his nearby home between rounds.

Place	Player	Score	To par
1	(United States) Mark McCumber	65-72-67=204	−12
2	(South Africa) David Frost	67-71-68=206	−10
3	(United States) Payne Stewart	71-65-71=207	−9
T4	(United States) Curt Byrum	66-73-69=208	−8
T4	(Australia) Greg Norman	66-74-68=208	−8
T4	(United States) Dan Pohl	69-69-70=208	−8
T7	(United States) Chip Beck	73-67-69=209	−7
T7	(United States) Ben Crenshaw	69-71-69=209	−7
T7	(United States) Tom Kite	67-73-69=209	−7
T7	(United States) Lanny Wadkins	70-72-67=209	−7

=== Final round ===
Sunday, March 27, 1988

Champion
(c) = past champion

Place	Player	Score	To par	Money ($)
1	(United States) Mark McCumber	65-72-67-69=273	−15	225,000
2	(United States) Mike Reid	68-69-73-67=277	−11	135,000
T3	(South Africa) Fulton Allem	73-72-65-68=278	−10	65,000
T3	(United States) Curt Byrum	66-73-69-70=278	−10	65,000
T3	(South Africa) David Frost	67-71-68-72=278	−10	65,000
T6	(United States) Gil Morgan	69-70-71-69=279	−9	43,437
T6	(United States) Lanny Wadkins (c)	70-72-67-70=279	−9	43,437
T8	(United States) Wayne Levi	70-71-71-68=280	−8	36,250
T8	(United States) Dan Pohl	69-69-70-72=280	−8	36,250
T8	(United States) Payne Stewart	71-65-71-73=280	−8	36,250

Leaderboard below the top 10
Place	Player	Score	To par	Money ($)
T11	(United States) Chip Beck	73-67-69-72=281	−7	26,500
T11	(United States) Ben Crenshaw	69-71-69-72=281	−7	26,500
T11	(United States) Tom Kite	67-73-69-72=281	−7	26,500
T11	(Australia) Greg Norman	66-74-68-73=281	−7	26,500
T11	(United States) Mark Wiebe	71-70-71-69=281	−7	26,500
T16	(United States) Mike Hulbert	74-69-69-70=282	−6	17,535
T16	(United States) Peter Jacobsen	69-75-69-69=282	−6	17,535
T16	(United States) Gary Koch	70-72-69-71=282	−6	17,535
T16	(West Germany) Bernhard Langer	71-72-67-72=282	−6	17,535
T16	(United States) Calvin Peete (c)	70-69-71-72=282	−6	17,535
T16	(United States) Gene Sauers	70-71-70-71=282	−6	17,535
T16	(United States) Joey Sindelar	69-72-67-74=282	−6	17,535
T23	(United States) Fred Couples (c)	72-72-71-68=283	−5	11,500
T23	(United States) Ed Fiori	67-73-72-71=283	−5	11,500
T23	(United States) Larry Rinker	75-70-68-70=283	−5	11,500
T23	(United States) Fuzzy Zoeller	67-74-71-71=283	−5	11,500
T27	(Canada) Dan Halldorson	70-71-71-72=284	−4	9,250
T27	(United States) John Mahaffey (c)	67-75-69-73=284	−4	9,250
T27	(Japan) Tsuneyuki Nakajima	73-72-67-72=284	−4	9,250
T30	(United States) Paul Azinger	70-71-72-72=285	−3	8,125
T30	(United States) Morris Hatalsky	70-68-71-76=285	−3	8,125
T30	(United States) Dick Mast	70-70-72-73=285	−3	8,125
33	(United States) Kenny Perry	71-71-72-72=286	−2	7,375
T34	(United States) Jay Don Blake	70-73-72-72=287	−1	6,907
T34	(United States) Bob Eastwood	70-72-72-73=287	−1	6,907
T36	(Canada) Dave Barr	70-75-73-70=288	E	5,760
T36	(United States) Andy Bean	72-74-70-72=288	E	5,760
T36	(United States) Buddy Gardner	72-74-70-72=288	E	5,760
T36	(United States) Donnie Hammond	68-75-73-72=288	E	5,760
T36	(United States) Jodie Mudd	72-74-68-74=288	E	5,760
T36	(United States) Doug Tewell	72-72-73-71=288	E	5,760
T42	(United States) Lennie Clements	74-71-71-73=289	+1	4,625
T42	(United States) Brad Fabel	72-70-74-73=289	+1	4,625
T42	(United States) Corey Pavin	70-76-69-74=289	+1	4,625
T45	(United States) Tom Purtzer	74-72-70-74=290	+2	3,875
T45	(United States) Jeff Sluman	71-73-71-75=290	+2	3,875
T45	(United States) Craig Stadler	74-71-73-72=290	+2	3,875
T48	(United States) David Edwards	73-71-71-76=291	+3	3,275
T48	(United States) Steve Jones	73-72-72-74=291	+3	3,275
T48	(United States) Jack Renner	71-72-76-72=291	+3	3,275
T51	(United States) Bob Lohr	73-73-74-72=292	+4	3,008
T51	(United States) Roger Maltbie	72-72-71-77=292	+4	3,008
T51	(United States) Bobby Wadkins	72-71-76-73=292	+4	3,008
T54	(United States) Mike Donald	70-74-75-74=293	+5	2,875
T54	(Australia) Steve Elkington	70-74-75-74=293	+5	2,875
T54	(United States) Don Pooley	71-75-76-71=293	+5	2,875
57	(United States) Steve Pate	70-71-74-79=294	+6	2,825
T58	(United States) Jim Carter	73-73-76-73=295	+7	2,787
T58	(United States) Pat McGowan	74-70-72-79=295	+7	2,787
T60	(Japan) Isao Aoki	71-75-75-75=296	+8	2,725
T60	(United States) Bobby Clampett	73-72-73-78=296	+8	2,725
T60	(United States) David Ishii	72-74-69-81=296	+8	2,725
T64	(United States) Mark Calcavecchia	70-75-76-76=297	+9	2,637
T64	(United States) Dave Eichelberger	73-73-72-79=297	+9	2,637
T64	(United States) Chris Perry	75-69-77-76=297	+9	2,637
T64	(United States) Willie Wood	73-73-75-76=297	+9	2,637
68	(United States) John Huston	73-73-78-74=298	+10	2,575
T69	(United States) Mark Lye	71-74-73-81=299	+11	2,537
T69	(United States) Mike McCullough	74-72-77-76=299	+11	2,537
71	(United States) Andy North	73-72-73-83=301	+13	2,500
72	(United States) David Ogrin	67-77-76-82=302	+14	2,475
CUT	(Taiwan) Chen Tze-chung	75-72=147	+3	
CUT	(Australia) Wayne Grady	71-76=147	+3	
CUT	(Australia) David Graham	71-76=147	+3	
CUT	(United States) Ken Green	70-77=147	+3	
CUT	(United States) Hale Irwin	75-72=147	+3	
CUT	(United States) Larry Mize	73-74=147	+3	
CUT	(United States) Jack Nicklaus (c)	73-74=147	+3	
CUT	(United States) Mike Sullivan	76-71=147	+3	
CUT	(Scotland) Ken Brown	77-71=148	+4	
CUT	(United States) Ed Dougherty	73-75=148	+4	
CUT	(United States) Andrew Magee	74-74=148	+4	
CUT	(United States) Blaine McCallister	76-72=148	+4	
CUT	(United States) Mark O'Meara	76-72=148	+4	
CUT	(United States) Leonard Thompson	72-76=148	+4	
CUT	(United States) Tom Watson	75-73=148	+4	
CUT	(United States) Keith Clearwater	72-77=149	+5	
CUT	(United States) Russ Cochran	74-75=149	+5	
CUT	(United States) Bob Gilder	76-73=149	+5	
CUT	(United States) Bruce Lietzke	74-75=149	+5	
CUT	(United States) Johnny Miller	73-76=149	+5	
CUT	(United States) Tim Simpson	70-79=149	+5	
CUT	(Canada) Ray Stewart	75-74=149	+5	
CUT	(United States) D. A. Weibring	73-76=149	+5	
CUT	(United States) Brad Faxon	72-78=150	+6	
CUT	(United States) Gary Hallberg	76-74=150	+6	
CUT	(United States) Mark Hayes (c)	75-75=150	+6	
CUT	(United States) Lon Hinkle	80-70=150	+6	
CUT	(United States) Scott Hoch	78-72=150	+6	
CUT	(United States) Kenny Knox	75-75=150	+6	
CUT	(United States) Loren Roberts	73-77=150	+6	
CUT	(United States) Clarence Rose	71-79=150	+6	
CUT	(United States) Scott Simpson	73-77=150	+6	
CUT	(United States) Howard Twitty	73-77=150	+6	
CUT	(Zimbabwe) Denis Watson	74-76=150	+6	
CUT	(United States) Tom Byrum	76-75=151	+7	
CUT	(Australia) Rodger Davis	74-77=151	+7	
CUT	(United States) Vance Heafner	77-74=151	+7	
CUT	(United States) Rocco Mediate	76-75=151	+7	
CUT	(United States) Larry Nelson	73-78=151	+7	
CUT	(United States) Dave Rummells	78-73=151	+7	
CUT	(United States) Tom Sieckmann	73-78=151	+7	
CUT	(United States) Phil Blackmar	75-77=152	+8	
CUT	(United States) Danny Edwards	78-74=152	+8	
CUT	(United States) Hubert Green	75-77=152	+8	
CUT	(United States) Billy Kratzert	74-78=152	+8	
CUT	(Scotland) Sandy Lyle (c)	79-73=152	+8	
CUT	(United States) Hal Sutton (c)	76-76=152	+8	
CUT	(United States) John Cook	74-79=153	+9	
CUT	(United States) Rick Fehr	75-78=153	+9	
CUT	(United States) Bill Glasson	77-76=153	+9	
CUT	(United States) John Inman	76-77=153	+9	
CUT	(United States) Bill Sander	76-77=153	+9	
CUT	(United States) Tony Sills	77-76=153	+9	
CUT	(Wales) Ian Woosnam	74-79=153	+9	
CUT	(Spain) Seve Ballesteros	76-78=154	+10	
CUT	(England) Nick Faldo	75-79=154	+10	
CUT	(United States) Dan Forsman	77-77=154	+10	
CUT	(Japan) Akiyoshi Ohmachi	77-77=154	+10	
CUT	(United States) Bill Rogers	79-75=154	+10	
CUT	(United States) J. C. Snead	78-76=154	+10	
CUT	(United States) Bob Tway	77-77=154	+10	
CUT	(United States) Robert Wrenn	75-79=154	+10	
CUT	(Canada) Richard Zokol	77-77=154	+10	
CUT	(United States) Ronnie Black	77-78=155	+11	
CUT	(United States) Sam Randolph	79-76=155	+11	
CUT	(United States) Fred Wadsworth	75-82=157	+13	
CUT	(United States) Mac O'Grady	79-83=162	+18	
WD	(United States) George Burns	76	+4	
DQ	(United States) Raymond Floyd (c)	73-73-70-80=296	+8	
DQ	(United States) Davis Love III	73-71=144	E	
DQ	(Zimbabwe) Nick Price	74-75=149	+5	
DQ	(United States) Curtis Strange	73	+1	
DQ	(United States) Jay Haas	77	+5	
