= 1985 Masters Tournament =

- Front cover of the 1985 Masters Guide

Tournament information
- Dates: April 11–14, 1985
- Location: Augusta, Georgia; 33.503°N 82.020°W
- Course: Augusta National Golf Club
- Organized by: Augusta National Golf Club
- Tour: PGA Tour

Statistics
- Par: 72
- Length: 6,905 yards (6,314 m)
- Field: 77 players, 60 after cut
- Cut: 150 (+6)
- Prize fund: $700,793
- Winner's share: $126,000

Champion
- (West Germany) Bernhard Langer
- 282 (−6)

Location map
- Location in the United States Location in Georgia

The 1985 Masters Tournament was the 49th Masters Tournament, held April 11–14 at Augusta National Golf Club in Augusta, Georgia.

Bernhard Langer won the first of his two major championships, both Masters, two strokes ahead of runners-up Seve Ballesteros, Raymond Floyd, and Curtis Strange. A 69 (−3) on Saturday put Floyd in the lead after 54 holes at 212 (−4); Strange was a stroke back, with Langer and Ballesteros two strokes back. Despite an opening round 80, Strange led by three strokes with six holes to play in the final round, but made key bogeys at 13 and 15 when his attempts to reach both greens in two shots found water instead and finished two strokes back. It was Strange's only top-5 finish at Augusta, but he won consecutive U.S. Opens in 1988 and 1989.

Langer, age 27 and dressed in red, birdied four of the last seven holes to win the green jacket. The second champion from Europe, he had consecutive rounds of 68 (−4) on the weekend to become the first winner of a major from Germany (then West Germany). Langer won a second green jacket eight years later in 1993.

== Field ==
1. Masters champions

Tommy Aaron, George Archer (11,12), Seve Ballesteros (3,10,11), Gay Brewer, Billy Casper, Charles Coody, Ben Crenshaw (8,12,13), Raymond Floyd (4,8,13), Doug Ford, Bob Goalby, Jack Nicklaus (2,4,8,11,12), Arnold Palmer, Gary Player (8,10), Craig Stadler (11,12,13), Art Wall Jr., Tom Watson (2,3,8,9,11,12,13), Fuzzy Zoeller (2,9,11,13)

- Jack Burke Jr., Ralph Guldahl, Claude Harmon, Ben Hogan, Herman Keiser, Cary Middlecoff, Byron Nelson, Henry Picard, Gene Sarazen, and Sam Snead did not play.

The following categories only apply to Americans

2. U.S. Open champions (last five years)

Larry Nelson (4,8,11)

3. The Open champions (last five years)

Bill Rogers

4. PGA champions (last five years)

Hal Sutton (9,10,12), Lee Trevino (9,10,12)

5. 1984 U.S. Amateur semi-finalists

Jerry Haas (a), Sam Randolph (a), Randy Sonnier (7,a), Scott Verplank (6,7,a)

6. Previous two U.S. Amateur and Amateur champions

Jay Sigel (7,a)

7. Members of the 1984 U.S. Eisenhower Trophy team

John Inman (a)

8. Top 24 players and ties from the 1984 Masters Tournament

Andy Bean (9,12), Ronnie Black (11), Rex Caldwell, Fred Couples (9,12), Danny Edwards, David Edwards (12), Jay Haas (9,13), Hale Irwin (9), Tom Kite (11,12,13), Wayne Levi (11,12), Mark Lye, Larry Mize (10), Gil Morgan (12,13), Calvin Peete (10,11,12,13), Jack Renner (12), Payne Stewart (12)

9. Top 16 players and ties from the 1984 U.S. Open

Lennie Clements, Peter Jacobsen (11,12), Mark McCumber (11), Johnny Miller, Mark O'Meara (11,12), Tom Purtzer, Tim Simpson, Curtis Strange (11,12,13), Jim Thorpe, Lanny Wadkins (10,11,12,13)

10. Top eight players and ties from 1984 PGA Championship

Gary Hallberg (12), Scott Simpson (11,12)

11. Winners of PGA Tour events since the previous Masters

Woody Blackburn, Bob Eastwood (12), Hubert Green, Scott Hoch (12), Billy Kratzert, Corey Pavin (12), Joey Sindelar

12. Top 30 players from the 1984 PGA Tour money list

Gary Koch, Bruce Lietzke, John Mahaffey

13. Members of the U.S. 1983 Ryder Cup team

Bob Gilder

14. Foreign invitations

Isao Aoki (9), Ian Baker-Finch, Nick Faldo (8,11), David Graham (2,8), Bernhard Langer, Sandy Lyle, Tsuneyuki Nakajima, Greg Norman (9,11,12), José María Olazábal (6,a), Sam Torrance, Denis Watson (11,12)

- Numbers in brackets indicate categories that the player would have qualified under had they been American.

== Round summaries ==
=== First round ===
Thursday, April 11, 1985

Place	Player	Score	To par
1	(United States) Gary Hallberg	68	−4
T2	(United States) Payne Stewart	69	−3
T2	(United States) Tom Watson	69	−3
T4	(United States) Ben Crenshaw	70	−2
T4	(United States) Raymond Floyd	70	−2
T4	(United States) John Inman (a)	70	−2
T4	(United States) Sam Randolph (a)	70	−2
T4	(United States) Lee Trevino	70	−2
T9	(United States) Billy Casper	71	−1
T9	(United States) Larry Mize	71	−1
T9	(United States) Jack Nicklaus	71	−1
T9	(South Africa) Gary Player	71	−1
T9	(United States) Scott Simpson	71	−1

=== Second round ===
Friday, April 12, 1985

Place	Player	Score	To par
T1	(United States) Craig Stadler	73-67=140	−4
T1	(United States) Payne Stewart	69-71=140	−4
T1	(United States) Tom Watson	69-71=140	−4
4	(United States) Gary Hallberg	68-73=141	−3
5	(United States) Gary Koch	72-70=142	−2
T6	(Spain) Seve Ballesteros	72-71=143	−1
T6	(United States) Raymond Floyd	70-73=143	−1
T6	(United States) Bruce Lietzke	72-71=143	−1
T6	(Scotland) Sandy Lyle	78-65=143	−1
T6	(United States) Lee Trevino	70-73=143	−1

=== Third round ===
Saturday, April 13, 1985

Place	Player	Score	To par
1	(United States) Raymond Floyd	70-73-69=212	−4
2	(United States) Curtis Strange	80-65-68=213	−3
T3	(Spain) Seve Ballesteros	72-71-71=214	−2
T3	(West Germany) Bernhard Langer	72-74-68=214	−2
T5	(United States) Gary Koch	72-70-73=215	−1
T5	(United States) Lee Trevino	70-73-72=215	−1
T5	(United States) Tom Watson	69-71-75=215	−1
T8	(Australia) David Graham	74-71-71=216	E
T8	(United States) Gary Hallberg	68-73-75=216	E
T8	(United States) Bruce Lietzke	72-71-73=216	E
T8	(United States) Craig Stadler	73-67-76=216	E
T8	(United States) Payne Stewart	69-71-76=216	E
T8	(United States) Hal Sutton	77-69-70=216	E
T8	(United States) Jim Thorpe	73-71-72=216	E

=== Final round ===
Sunday, April 14, 1985

==== Final leaderboard ====
Champion
Silver Cup winner (low amateur)
(a) = amateur
(c) = past champion

Top 10
Place	Player	Score	To par	Money (US$)
1	(West Germany) Bernhard Langer	72-74-68-68=282	−6	126,000
T2	(Spain) Seve Ballesteros (c)	72-71-71-70=284	−4	52,267
T2	(United States) Raymond Floyd (c)	70-73-69-72=284	−4	52,267
T2	(United States) Curtis Strange	80-65-68-71=284	−4	52,267
5	(United States) Jay Haas	73-73-72-67=285	−3	28,000
T6	(United States) Gary Hallberg	68-73-75-70=286	−2	22,663
T6	(United States) Bruce Lietzke	72-71-73-70=286	−2	22,663
T6	(United States) Jack Nicklaus (c)	71-74-72-69=286	−2	22,663
T6	(United States) Craig Stadler (c)	73-67-76-70=286	−2	22,663
T10	(United States) Fred Couples	75-73-69-70=287	−1	16,800
T10	(Australia) David Graham	74-71-71-71=287	−1	16,800
T10	(United States) Lee Trevino	70-73-72-72=287	−1	16,800
T10	(United States) Tom Watson (c)	69-71-75-72=287	−1	16,800

Leaderboard below the top 10
Place	Player	Score	To par	Money ($)
T14	(United States) Billy Kratzert	73-77-69-69=288	E	12,950
T14	(United States) John Mahaffey	72-75-70-71=288	E	12,950
T16	(Japan) Isao Aoki	72-74-71-72=289	+1	11,550
T16	(United States) Gary Koch	72-70-73-74=289	+1	11,550
T18	(United States) Wayne Levi	75-72-70-73=290	+2	9,128
T18	(United States) Mark McCumber	73-73-79-65=290	+2	9,128
T18	(United States) Sam Randolph (a)	70-75-72-73=290	+2	0
T18	(United States) Tim Simpson	73-72-75-70=290	+2	9,128
T18	(United States) Jim Thorpe	73-71-72-74=290	+2	9,128
T18	(United States) Lanny Wadkins	72-73-72-73=290	+2	9,128
24	(United States) Mark O'Meara	73-76-72-70=291	+3	7,280
T25	(United States) Andy Bean	72-74-73-73=292	+4	5,670
T25	(England) Nick Faldo	73-73-75-71=292	+4	5,670
T25	(Scotland) Sandy Lyle	78-65-76-73=292	+4	5,670
T25	(United States) Johnny Miller	77-68-76-71=292	+4	5,670
T25	(United States) Corey Pavin	72-75-75-70=292	+4	5,670
T25	(United States) Payne Stewart	69-71-76-76=292	+4	5,670
T31	(United States) Jerry Haas (a)	76-69-73-75=293	+5	0
T31	(United States) Calvin Peete	75-70-74-74=293	+5	4,445
T31	(United States) Joey Sindelar	73-73-75-72=293	+5	4,445
T31	(United States) Hal Sutton	77-69-70-77=293	+5	4,445
T31	(Scotland) Sam Torrance	73-73-75-72=293	+5	4,445
T36	(United States) Lennie Clements	75-75-73-71=294	+6	3,612
T36	(United States) Hale Irwin	78-71-73-72=294	+6	3,612
T36	(United States) Mark Lye	72-73-79-70=294	+6	3,612
T36	(United States) Larry Nelson	73-75-74-72=294	+6	3,612
T36	(South Africa) Gary Player (c)	71-75-73-75=294	+6	3,612
T41	(United States) Ronnie Black	74-71-75-75=295	+7	3,010
T41	(United States) David Edwards	74-72-77-72=295	+7	3,010
T41	(United States) Scott Simpson	71-73-77-74=295	+7	3,010
T44	(United States) Charles Coody (c)	72-77-74-73=296	+8	2,660
T44	(United States) Bob Gilder	72-75-81-68=296	+8	2,660
T44	(United States) Jay Sigel (a)	76-71-77-72=296	+8	0
T47	(United States) Woody Blackburn	78-71-72-77=298	+10	2,115
T47	(United States) Danny Edwards	77-72-71-78=298	+10	2,115
T47	(United States) Larry Mize	71-75-76-76=298	+10	2,115
T47	(Japan) Tsuneyuki Nakajima	77-70-78-73=298	+10	2,115
T47	(Australia) Greg Norman	73-72-75-78=298	+10	2,115
T47	(United States) Jack Renner	72-77-70-79=298	+10	2,115
T53	(United States) George Archer (c)	73-74-79-73=299	+11	1,800
T53	(United States) Scott Hoch	73-76-74-76=299	+11	1,800
T53	(Zimbabwe) Denis Watson	76-72-75-76=299	+11	1,800
56	(United States) Rex Caldwell	73-74-77-77=301	+13	1,760
T57	(United States) Billy Casper (c)	71-78-74-79=302	+14	1,730
T57	(United States) Ben Crenshaw (c)	70-76-77-79=302	+14	1,730
59	(United States) John Inman (a)	70-76-80-77=303	+15	0
60	(United States) Bob Eastwood	77-72-82-77=308	+20	1,700
CUT	(United States) Randy Sonnier (a)	75-77=152	+8	
CUT	(United States) Scott Verplank (a)	78-74=152	+8	
CUT	(United States) Fuzzy Zoeller (c)	77-75=152	+8	
CUT	(United States) Bill Rogers	78-75=153	+9	
CUT	(United States) Peter Jacobsen	78-76=154	+10	
CUT	(United States) Tom Kite	75-79=154	+10	
CUT	(United States) Gil Morgan	74-80=154	+10	
CUT	(United States) Tom Purtzer	76-78=154	+10	
CUT	(United States) Arnold Palmer (c)	83-72=155	+11	
CUT	(Australia) Ian Baker-Finch	77-79=156	+12	
CUT	(United States) Hubert Green	74-83=157	+13	
CUT	(Spain) José María Olazábal (a)	81-76=157	+13	
CUT	(United States) Art Wall Jr. (c)	76-81=157	+13	
CUT	(United States) Gay Brewer (c)	79-79=158	+14	
CUT	(United States) Tommy Aaron (c)	79-80=159	+15	
CUT	(United States) Bob Goalby (c)	79-80=159	+15	
WD	(United States) Doug Ford (c)	76	+4	

==== Scorecard ====
Hole	1	2	3	4	5	6	7	8	9	10	11	12	13	14	15	16	17	18
Par	4	5	4	3	4	3	4	5	4	4	4	3	5	4	5	3	4	4
(West Germany) Langer	−2	−1	−2	−2	−3	−3	−3	−3	−3	−3	−3	−4	−5	−5	−6	−6	−7	−6
(Spain) Ballesteros	−2	−3	−3	−3	−3	−3	−3	−3	−3	−3	−3	−3	−3	−3	−4	−4	−4	−4
(United States) Floyd	−4	−4	−4	−4	−4	−3	−3	−3	−2	−3	−3	−2	−2	−2	−4	−4	−4	−4
(United States) Strange	−3	−4	−4	−5	−5	−5	−6	−7	−7	−6	−6	−7	−6	−6	−5	−5	−5	−4

Cumulative tournament scores, relative to par

Eagle	Birdie	Bogey
