= 1988 PGA Tour =

Golf tour season

1988 PGA Tour season
- Duration: January 14, 1988 – November 13, 1988
- Number of official events: 47
- Most wins: (United States) Curtis Strange (4)
- Money list: (United States) Curtis Strange
- PGA Player of the Year: (United States) Curtis Strange
- Rookie of the Year: (United States) Jim Benepe

The 1988 PGA Tour was the 73rd season of the PGA Tour, the main professional golf tour in the United States. It was also the 20th season since separating from the PGA of America.

== Schedule ==
The following table lists official events during the 1988 season.

Date	Tournament	Location	Purse (US$)	Winner (Note: The number in parentheses after each winner's name is the number of PGA Tour events they had won up to and including that tournament. This information is only shown for PGA Tour members.)	OWGR points	Notes
Jan 17	MONY Tournament of Champions	California	500,000	(United States) Steve Pate (2)	38	Winners-only event
Jan 24	Bob Hope Chrysler Classic	California	1,000,000	(United States) Jay Haas (7)	50	Pro-Am
Jan 31	Phoenix Open	Arizona	650,000	(Scotland) Sandy Lyle (4)	52	
Feb 7	AT&T Pebble Beach National Pro-Am	California	700,000	(United States) Steve Jones (1)	64	Pro-Am
Feb 14	Hawaiian Open	Hawaii	600,000	(United States) Lanny Wadkins (17)	48	
Feb 21	Shearson Lehman Hutton Andy Williams Open	California	650,000	(United States) Steve Pate (3)	46	
Feb 28	Los Angeles Open	California	750,000	(United States) Chip Beck (1)	54	
Mar 6	Doral-Ryder Open	Florida	1,000,000	(United States) Ben Crenshaw (14)	64	
Mar 13	Honda Classic	Florida	700,000	(United States) Joey Sindelar (4)	46	
Mar 20	Hertz Bay Hill Classic	Florida	750,000	(United States) Paul Azinger (4)	68	
Mar 27	The Players Championship	Florida	1,250,000	(United States) Mark McCumber (6)	78	Special event
Apr 3	KMart Greater Greensboro Open	North Carolina	1,000,000	(Scotland) Sandy Lyle (5)	50	
Apr 10	Masters Tournament	Georgia	1,000,000	(Scotland) Sandy Lyle (6)	100	Major championship
Apr 10	Deposit Guaranty Golf Classic	Mississippi	200,000	(United States) Frank Conner (n/a)	8	Alternate event (Note: Official money; unofficial win.)
Apr 17	MCI Heritage Golf Classic	South Carolina	700,000	(Australia) Greg Norman (6)	58	Invitational
Apr 24	USF&G Classic	Louisiana	750,000	(United States) Chip Beck (2)	40	
May 1	Independent Insurance Agent Open	Texas	700,000	(United States) Curtis Strange (13)	46	
May 8	Panasonic Las Vegas Invitational	Nevada	1,388,889	(United States) Gary Koch (6)	50	
May 15	GTE Byron Nelson Golf Classic	Texas	750,000	(United States) Bruce Lietzke (11)	50	
May 22	Colonial National Invitation	Texas	750,000	(United States) Lanny Wadkins (18)	50	Invitational
May 29	Memorial Tournament	Ohio	930,250	(United States) Curtis Strange (14)	64	Invitational
Jun 5	Kemper Open	Maryland	800,000	(United States) Morris Hatalsky (3)	42	
Jun 12	Manufacturers Hanover Westchester Classic	New York	700,000	(Spain) Seve Ballesteros (8)	54	
Jun 20	U.S. Open	Massachusetts	1,000,000	(United States) Curtis Strange (15)	100	Major championship
Jun 26	Georgia-Pacific Atlanta Golf Classic	Georgia	700,000	(United States) Larry Nelson (10)	44	
Jul 3	Beatrice Western Open	Illinois	900,000	(United States) Jim Benepe (1)	44	
Jul 10	Anheuser-Busch Golf Classic	Virginia	650,000	(United States) Tom Sieckmann (1)	36	
Jul 17	Hardee's Golf Classic	Illinois	600,000	(United States) Blaine McCallister (1)	18	
Jul 18	The Open Championship	England	£500,000	(Spain) Seve Ballesteros (9)	100	Major championship (Note: Unofficial money event at the time, but retrospectively counted as an official win.)
Jul 24	Canon Sammy Davis Jr.-Greater Hartford Open	Connecticut	700,000	(United States) Mark Brooks (1)	36	
Jul 31	Buick Open	Michigan	700,000	(United States) Scott Verplank (2)	42	
Aug 7	Federal Express St. Jude Classic	Tennessee	750,000	(United States) Jodie Mudd (1)	44	
Aug 14	PGA Championship	Oklahoma	1,000,000	(United States) Jeff Sluman (1)	100	Major championship
Aug 21	The International	Colorado	1,115,280	(United States) Joey Sindelar (5)	54	
Aug 28	NEC World Series of Golf	Ohio	900,000	(United States) Mike Reid (2)	64	Limited-field event
Aug 28	Provident Classic	Tennessee	450,000	(United States) Phil Blackmar (2)	10	Alternate event
Sep 4	Canadian Open	Canada	750,000	(United States) Ken Green (3)	42	
Sep 11	Greater Milwaukee Open	Wisconsin	700,000	(United States) Ken Green (4)	32	
Sep 18	Bank of Boston Classic	Massachusetts	600,000	(United States) Mark Calcavecchia (3)	44	
Sep 25	B.C. Open	New York	500,000	(United States) Bill Glasson (2)	24	
Oct 2	Southern Open	Georgia	400,000	(South Africa) David Frost (1)	26	
Oct 9	Gatlin Brothers-Southwest Golf Classic	Texas	400,000	(United States) Tom Purtzer (3)	28	
Oct 16	Texas Open	Texas	600,000	(United States) Corey Pavin (7)	32	
Oct 23	Pensacola Open	Florida	400,000	(United States) Andrew Magee (1)	20	
Oct 29	Walt Disney World/Oldsmobile Classic	Florida	700,000	(United States) Bob Lohr (1)	48	
Nov 6	Northern Telecom Tucson Open	Arizona	600,000	(South Africa) David Frost (2)	48	
Nov 13	Centel Classic	Florida	500,000	(United States) Bill Glasson (3)	10	
Nov 14	Nabisco Championship	California	2,000,000	(United States) Curtis Strange (16)	56	Tour Championship

=== Unofficial events ===
The following events were sanctioned by the PGA Tour, but did not carry official money, nor were wins official.

Date	Tournament	Location	Purse ($)	Winner(s)	OWGR points	Notes
May 30	PGA Grand Slam of Golf	Illinois	n/a	(United States) Larry Nelson	n/a	Limited-field event
Nov 19	Isuzu Kapalua International	Hawaii	600,000	(United States) Bob Gilder	24	
Nov 27	Skins Game	California	450,000	(United States) Raymond Floyd	n/a	Limited-field event
Dec 4	JCPenney Classic	Florida	800,000	(United States) Amy Benz and (United States) John Huston	n/a	Team event
Dec 11	World Cup	Australia	750,000	(United States) Ben Crenshaw and (United States) Mark McCumber	n/a	Team event
Dec 11	World Cup Individual Trophy	Australia	750,000	(United States) Ben Crenshaw	n/a	
Dec 11	Chrysler Team Championship	Florida	600,000	(United States) George Burns and (United States) Wayne Levi	n/a	Team event
Dec 18	Kirin Cup	Florida	1,000,000	Team USA	n/a	Team event

== Money list ==
The money list was based on prize money won during the season, calculated in U.S. dollars.

Position	Player	Prize money ($)
1	(United States) Curtis Strange	1,147,644
2	(United States) Chip Beck	916,818
3	(United States) Joey Sindelar	813,732
4	(United States) Ken Green	779,181
5	(United States) Tom Kite	760,405
6	(United States) Mark Calcavecchia	751,912
7	(Scotland) Sandy Lyle	726,934
8	(United States) Ben Crenshaw	696,895
9	(South Africa) David Frost	691,500
10	(United States) Lanny Wadkins	616,596

== Awards ==
Award	Winner	Ref.
PGA Player of the Year	(United States) Curtis Strange	
Rookie of the Year	(United States) Jim Benepe	
Scoring leader (PGA Tour - Byron Nelson Award)	(Australia) Greg Norman	
Scoring leader (PGA - Vardon Trophy)	(United States) Chip Beck	

== See also ==
- 1988 Senior PGA Tour
