= 1985 PGA Tour =

Golf tour season

1985 PGA Tour season
- Duration: January 10, 1985 – October 27, 1985
- Number of official events: 43
- Most wins: (United States) Curtis Strange (3) (United States) Lanny Wadkins (3)
- Money list: (United States) Curtis Strange
- PGA Player of the Year: (United States) Lanny Wadkins
- Rookie of the Year: (United States) Phil Blackmar

The 1985 PGA Tour was the 70th season of the PGA Tour, the main professional golf tour in the United States. It was also the 17th season since separating from the PGA of America.

== Schedule ==
The following table lists official events during the 1985 season.

Date	Tournament	Location	Purse (US$)	Winner (Note: The number in parentheses after each winner's name is the number of PGA Tour events they had won up to and including that tournament. This information is only shown for PGA Tour members.)	Notes
Jan 13	Bob Hope Classic	California	500,000	(United States) Lanny Wadkins (13)	Pro-Am
Jan 20	Phoenix Open	Arizona	450,000	(United States) Calvin Peete (9)	
Jan 27	Los Angeles Open	California	400,000	(United States) Lanny Wadkins (14)	
Feb 3	Bing Crosby National Pro-Am	California	500,000	(United States) Mark O'Meara (2)	Pro-Am
Feb 10	Hawaiian Open	Hawaii	500,000	(United States) Mark O'Meara (3)	
Feb 17	Isuzu-Andy Williams San Diego Open	California	400,000	(United States) Woody Blackburn (2)	
Feb 24	Doral-Eastern Open	Florida	400,000	(United States) Mark McCumber (4)	
Mar 3	Honda Classic	Florida	500,000	(United States) Curtis Strange (6)	
Mar 10	Hertz Bay Hill Classic	Florida	500,000	(United States) Fuzzy Zoeller (7)	
Mar 17	USF&G Classic	Louisiana	400,000	(Spain) Seve Ballesteros (7)	
Mar 24	Panasonic Las Vegas Invitational	Nevada	950,000	(United States) Curtis Strange (7)	
Mar 31	Tournament Players Championship	Florida	900,000	(United States) Calvin Peete (10)	Special event
Apr 7	Greater Greensboro Open	North Carolina	400,000	(United States) Joey Sindelar (1)	
Apr 14	Masters Tournament	Georgia	700,000	(West Germany) Bernhard Langer (1)	Major championship
Apr 21	Sea Pines Heritage	South Carolina	400,000	(West Germany) Bernhard Langer (2)	Invitational
Apr 28	Houston Open	Texas	500,000	(United States) Raymond Floyd (19)	
May 5	MONY Tournament of Champions	California	400,000	(United States) Tom Kite (8)	Winners-only event
May 12	Byron Nelson Golf Classic	Texas	500,000	(United States) Bob Eastwood (3)	
May 19	Colonial National Invitation	Texas	500,000	(United States) Corey Pavin (2)	Invitational
May 26	Memorial Tournament	Ohio	579,230	(United States) Hale Irwin (17)	Invitational
Jun 2	Kemper Open	Maryland	500,000	(United States) Bill Glasson (1)	
Jun 9	Manufacturers Hanover Westchester Classic	New York	500,000	(United States) Roger Maltbie (4)	
Jun 16	U.S. Open	Michigan	650,000	(United States) Andy North (3)	Major championship
Jun 23	Georgia-Pacific Atlanta Golf Classic	Georgia	500,000	(United States) Wayne Levi (8)	
Jun 30	St. Jude Memphis Classic	Tennessee	500,000	(United States) Hal Sutton (4)	
Jul 7	Canadian Open	Canada	480,000	(United States) Curtis Strange (8)	
Jul 14	Anheuser-Busch Golf Classic	Virginia	500,000	(United States) Mark Wiebe (1)	
Jul 21	The Open Championship	England	£530,000	(Scotland) Sandy Lyle (1)	Major championship (Note: Unofficial money event at the time, but retrospectively counted as an official win.)
Jul 21	Lite Quad Cities Open	Illinois	300,000	(United States) Dan Forsman (1)	Alternate event
Jul 28	Canon Sammy Davis Jr.-Greater Hartford Open	Connecticut	600,000	(United States) Phil Blackmar (1)	
Aug 4	Western Open	Illinois	500,000	(United States) Scott Verplank (a) (1)	
Aug 11	PGA Championship	Colorado	700,000	(United States) Hubert Green (19)	Major championship
Aug 18	Buick Open	Michigan	450,000	(United States) Ken Green (1)	
Aug 25	NEC World Series of Golf	Ohio	700,000	(United States) Roger Maltbie (5)	Limited-field event
Sep 1	B.C. Open	New York	300,000	(United States) Joey Sindelar (2)	
Sep 8	Bank of Boston Classic	Massachusetts	400,000	(United States) George Burns (3)	
Sep 15	Greater Milwaukee Open	Wisconsin	300,000	(United States) Jim Thorpe (1)	
Sep 22	Southwest Golf Classic	Texas	400,000	(United States) Hal Sutton (5)	
Sep 29	Texas Open	Texas	350,000	(United States) John Mahaffey (8)	
Oct 6	Southern Open	Georgia	350,000	(United States) Tim Simpson (1)	
Oct 13	Walt Disney World/Oldsmobile Classic	Florida	400,000	(United States) Lanny Wadkins (15)	
Oct 20	Pensacola Open	Florida	300,000	(United States) Danny Edwards (5)	
Oct 27	Seiko-Tucson Match Play Championship	Arizona	700,000	(United States) Jim Thorpe (2)	Limited-field event

=== Unofficial events ===
The following events were sanctioned by the PGA Tour, but did not carry official money, nor were wins official.

Date	Tournament	Location	Purse ($)	Winner(s)	Notes
Sep 15	Ryder Cup	England	n/a	Team Europe	Team event
Nov 10	Nissan Cup	Florida	800,000	Team USA	New tournament Team event
Nov 10	Nissan Cup Individual Trophy	Florida	n/a	(Scotland) Sandy Lyle	
Nov 17	Isuzu Kapalua International	Hawaii	500,000	(United States) Mark O'Meara	
Nov 24	World Cup	California	743,000	(Canada) Dave Barr and (Canada) Dan Halldorson	Team event
Nov 24	World Cup Individual Trophy	California	743,000	(England) Howard Clark	
Dec 1	Skins Game	California	450,000	(United States) Fuzzy Zoeller	Limited-field event
Dec 8	JCPenney Classic	Florida	600,000	(United States) Larry Rinker and (United States) Laurie Rinker	Team event
Dec 14	Chrysler Team Championship	Florida	550,000	(United States) Raymond Floyd and (United States) Hal Sutton	Team event

== Money list ==
The money list was based on prize money won during the season, calculated in U.S. dollars.

Position	Player	Prize money ($)
1	(United States) Curtis Strange	542,321
2	(United States) Lanny Wadkins	446,893
3	(United States) Calvin Peete	384,489
4	(United States) Jim Thorpe	379,091
5	(United States) Raymond Floyd	378,989
6	(United States) Corey Pavin	367,506
7	(United States) Hal Sutton	365,340
8	(United States) Roger Maltbie	360,554
9	(United States) John Mahaffey	341,595
10	(United States) Mark O'Meara	340,840

== Awards ==
Award	Winner	Ref.
PGA Player of the Year	(United States) Lanny Wadkins	
Rookie of the Year	(United States) Phil Blackmar	
Scoring leader (PGA Tour – Byron Nelson Award)	(United States) Don Pooley	
Scoring leader (PGA – Vardon Trophy)	(United States) Don Pooley	

== See also ==
- 1985 Senior PGA Tour
