= Doral Open =

Golf tournament

Coordinates: 25.814°N 80.340°W

Ford Championship at Doral
Tournament information
- Location: Doral, Florida
- Established: 1962
- Course: Doral Golf Resort & Spa
- Par: 72
- Length: 7,481 yards (6,841 m)
- Tour: PGA Tour
- Format: Stroke play
- Prize fund: US$5,500,000
- Month played: March
- Final year: 2006

Tournament record score
- Aggregate: 264 Tiger Woods (2005)
- To par: −24 as above

Final champion
- (United States) Tiger Woods

Location map
- Location in the United States Location in Florida

The Doral Open was a professional golf tournament on the PGA Tour in the southeastern United States. It was played annually for 45 seasons, from 1962 to 2006, on the "Blue Monster" course at the Doral Golf Resort & Spa in Doral, Florida, a suburb west of Miami.

The introduction of the FedEx Cup in 2007 caused a change in the PGA Tour schedule. The WGC-CA Championship, a World Golf Championship event co-sponsored by the PGA Tour, moved from October to March and took the Doral Open's spot on the schedule. This championship was also held at the Blue Monster course for the next decade; it was renamed the WGC-Cadillac Championship in 2011 and continued at Doral through 2016. The resort was sold in 2012 and became Trump National Doral Miami. The PGA Tour Latinoamérica development tour will host the season-ending Shell Championship in December 2018 on the Golden Palm course to continue the PGA Tour's tradition of hosting at Doral.

== History ==
The tournament was played at various points in March, and sometimes in late February. Both the tournament's title and sponsor changed over the years, and included Ford Motor Company, Genuity, Ryder, and Eastern Air Lines. The Doral Golf Resort & Spa was formerly known as the Doral Country Club and was the sister hotel to the famous Doral Hotel on the ocean in Miami Beach, Florida.

The tournament usually attracted one of the strongest fields on the PGA Tour outside of the major championships and the World Golf Championships. The champions at Doral include major winners Jack Nicklaus, Tom Weiskopf, Lee Trevino, Billy Casper, Raymond Floyd, Greg Norman, Hubert Green, Ben Crenshaw, Lanny Wadkins, Tom Kite, Nick Faldo, Ernie Els, Jim Furyk, and Tiger Woods.

In 2005, nine of the top ten players in the official world rankings participated. After an exciting final round duel with then-World Number 4 Phil Mickelson, Tiger Woods won by a shot to regain the number one ranking he had lost six months earlier to Vijay Singh, who finished in a tie for third.

The 2006 Ford Championship at Doral marked the end of the Doral Open tournament and the field again included nine of the top ten in the world rankings. Woods repeated as champion, one-stroke ahead of runners-up Camilo Villegas and David Toms.

The historical broadcaster of the event was CBS Sports. With the PGA Tour's first centralized TV deal in 1999, the Southern Swing, including Doral, was assigned to NBC Sports. NBC covered the event until its conclusion as a regular event, and continued for its ten years as a World Golf Championship.

== Tournament highlights ==
- 1962: Billy Casper down by four shots with eight holes to go, comes back to win the inaugural version of the tournament. He beats Paul Bondeson by one shot.
- 1964: Billy Casper becomes Doral's first repeat winner. He finishes one shot ahead of Jack Nicklaus.
- 1965: Doug Sanders, winner the week before at the Pensacola Open, comes out victorious at Doral for the first time. He beats Bruce Devlin by one shot.
- 1969: Tom Shaw holds on to win his first ever PGA Tour title by one shot over Tommy Aaron in spite of making both a triple bogey and a double bogey during the tournament's final nine holes.
- 1973: Lee Trevino shoots a first round 64 on his way to a wire to wire victory. He finishes one shot ahead of Bruce Crampton and Tom Weiskopf.
- 1976: Hubert Green shoots a tournament record 270 for 72 holes on his way to a six-shot win over Mark Hayes and Jack Nicklaus.
- 1977: Andy Bean takes home his first Doral title on his 24th birthday. He edges David Graham by one shot.
- 1978: Previously a three-time runner-up at Doral, Tom Weiskopf wins by one shot over Jack Nicklaus in spite of a final round 65 by the Golden Bear that included his holing out three wedge shots during the tournament's closing 18 holes.
- 1979: Monday morning qualifier Mark McCumber wins by one shot over Bill Rogers.
- 1980: Doral for the first time ever goes to sudden death to determine the winner. On the second playoff hole, Raymond Floyd chips in from just off the green to beat Jack Nicklaus.
- 1981: Raymond Floyd becomes the first Doral champion to successfully defend his title. He wins by one shot over Keith Fergus and David Graham.
- 1986: Andy Bean defeats Hubert Green on the fourth hole of a sudden death playoff to become Doral's first three-time winner.
- 1988: Ben Crenshaw birdies the 72nd hole to win by one shot over Chip Beck and Mark McCumber.
- 1990: Greg Norman shoots a final round 62. Then on the first hole of a sudden death playoff with Tim Simpson, Mark Calcavecchia, and Paul Azinger, he chips in for eagle to take home the title.
- 1993: Greg Norman sets a new Doral record for 72 holes of 265 on his way to four stroke victory over Paul Azinger and Mark McCumber.
- 1994: John Huston, playing most of the final 18 holes by himself after his player partner Fred Couples withdraws due to injury, wins by three shots over Brad Bryant and Billy Andrade.
- 1999: Steve Elkington shoots a final round 64 to earn his second win at Doral. He edges Greg Kraft by one shot.
- 2004: On the first hole of a sudden death playoff with Scott Verplank, Craig Parry wins by holing out a 7-iron from 176 yards.
- 2006: In spite of bogeying the final two holes, Tiger Woods holds on to win Doral for the second consecutive year. He finishes one shot ahead of David Toms and Camilo Villegas.

== Winners ==
Year	Winner	Score	To Par	Margin of victory	Runner(s)-up	Winner's share ($)
Ford Championship at Doral
2006	(United States) Tiger Woods (2)	268	−20	1 stroke	(United States) David Toms (Colombia) Camilo Villegas	990,000
2005	(United States) Tiger Woods	264	−24	1 stroke	(United States) Phil Mickelson	990,000
2004	(Australia) Craig Parry	271	−17	Playoff	(United States) Scott Verplank	900,000
2003	(United States) Scott Hoch	271	−17	Playoff	(United States) Jim Furyk	900,000
Genuity Championship
2002	(South Africa) Ernie Els	271	−17	2 strokes	(United States) Tiger Woods	846,000
2001	(United States) Joe Durant	270	−18	2 strokes	(Canada) Mike Weir	810,000
Doral-Ryder Open
2000	(United States) Jim Furyk	265	−23	2 strokes	(United States) Franklin Langham	540,000
1999	(Australia) Steve Elkington (2)	275	−13	1 stroke	(United States) Greg Kraft	540,000
1998	(United States) Michael Bradley	278	−10	1 stroke	(United States) John Huston (United States) Billy Mayfair	360,000
1997	(Australia) Steve Elkington	275	−13	2 strokes	(United States) Larry Nelson (Zimbabwe) Nick Price	324,000
1996	(Australia) Greg Norman (3)	269	−19	2 strokes	(United States) Michael Bradley (Fiji) Vijay Singh	324,000
1995	(England) Nick Faldo	273	−15	1 stroke	(United States) Peter Jacobsen (Australia) Greg Norman	270,000
1994	(United States) John Huston	274	−14	3 strokes	(United States) Billy Andrade (United States) Brad Bryant	252,000
1993	(Australia) Greg Norman (2)	265	−23	4 strokes	(United States) Paul Azinger (United States) Mark McCumber	252,000
1992	(United States) Raymond Floyd (3)	271	−17	2 strokes	(United States) Keith Clearwater (United States) Fred Couples	252,000
1991	(United States) Rocco Mediate	276	−12	Playoff	(United States) Curtis Strange	252,000
1990	(Australia) Greg Norman	273	−15	Playoff	(United States) Paul Azinger (United States) Mark Calcavecchia (United States) Tim Simpson	252,000
1989	(United States) Bill Glasson	275	−13	1 stroke	(United States) Fred Couples	234,000
1988	(United States) Ben Crenshaw	274	−14	1 stroke	(United States) Chip Beck (United States) Mark McCumber	180,000
1987	(United States) Lanny Wadkins	277	−11	3 strokes	(Spain) Seve Ballesteros (United States) Tom Kite (United States) Don Pooley	180,000
Doral-Eastern Open
1986	(United States) Andy Bean (3)	276	−12	Playoff	(United States) Hubert Green	90,000
1985	(United States) Mark McCumber (2)	284	−4	1 stroke	(United States) Tom Kite	72,000
1984	(United States) Tom Kite	272	−16	2 strokes	(United States) Jack Nicklaus	72,000
1983	(United States) Gary Koch	271	−17	5 strokes	(United States) Ed Fiori	54,000
1982	(United States) Andy Bean (2)	278	−10	1 stroke	(United States) Scott Hoch (United States) Mike Nicolette (United States) Jerry Pate	54,000
1981	(United States) Raymond Floyd (2)	273	−15	1 stroke	(United States) Keith Fergus (Australia) David Graham	45,000
1980	(United States) Raymond Floyd	279	−9	Playoff	(United States) Jack Nicklaus	45,000
1979	(United States) Mark McCumber	279	−9	1 stroke	(United States) Bill Rogers	45,000
1978	(United States) Tom Weiskopf	272	−16	1 stroke	(United States) Jack Nicklaus	40,000
1977	(United States) Andy Bean	277	−11	1 stroke	(Australia) David Graham	40,000
1976	(United States) Hubert Green	270	−18	6 strokes	(United States) Mark Hayes (United States) Jack Nicklaus	40,000
1975	(United States) Jack Nicklaus (2)	276	−12	3 strokes	(United States) Forrest Fezler (United States) Bert Yancey	30,000
1974	(United States) Buddy Allin	272	−16	1 stroke	(United States) Jerry Heard	30,000
1973	(United States) Lee Trevino	276	−12	1 stroke	(Australia) Bruce Crampton (United States) Tom Weiskopf	30,000
1972	(United States) Jack Nicklaus	276	−12	2 strokes	(United States) Bob Rosburg (United States) Lee Trevino	30,000
Doral-Eastern Open Invitational
1971	(United States) J. C. Snead	275	−13	1 stroke	(United States) Gardner Dickinson	30,000
1970	(United States) Mike Hill	279	−9	4 strokes	(United States) Jim Colbert	30,000
Doral Open Invitational
1969	(United States) Tom Shaw	276	−12	1 stroke	(United States) Tommy Aaron	30,000
1968	(United States) Gardner Dickinson	275	−13	1 stroke	(United States) Tom Weiskopf	20,000
1967	(United States) Doug Sanders (2)	275	−9	1 stroke	(South Africa) Harold Henning (United States) Art Wall Jr.	20,000
1966	(United States) Phil Rodgers	278	−10	1 stroke	(United States) Jay Dolan (United States) Kermit Zarley	20,000
1965	(United States) Doug Sanders	274	−14	1 stroke	(Australia) Bruce Devlin	11,000
1964	(United States) Billy Casper (2)	277	−11	1 stroke	(United States) Jack Nicklaus	7,500
Doral C.C. Open Invitational
1963	(United States) Dan Sikes	283	−5	1 stroke	(United States) Sam Snead	9,000
1962	(United States) Billy Casper	283	−5	1 stroke	(United States) Paul Bondeson	9,000
