= Daikyo Palm Meadows Cup =

Tournament information
- Location: Carrara, Queensland, Australia
- Established: 1988
- Course: Palm Meadows Golf Course
- Par: 72
- Tour: PGA Tour of Australasia
- Format: Stroke play
- Prize fund: A$1,400,000
- Month played: January
- Final year: 1992

Tournament record score
- Aggregate: 271 Rodger Davis (1990); 271 Curtis Strange (1990); 271 Greg Turner (1991)
- To par: −17 as above

Final champion
- (Northern Ireland) Ronan Rafferty
- Location in Australia Location in Queensland

The Daikyo Palm Meadows Cup was a golf tournament held in Australia from 1988 to 1992 at the Palm Meadows Golf Course, Carrara, Queensland. Prize money was A$500,000 in 1988, A$600,000 in 1989, A$800,000 in 1990, A$1,200,000 in 1991 and A$1,400,000 in 1992.

== Winners ==
Year	Winner	Score	To par	Margin of victory	Runner(s)-up	Winner's share (A$)	Ref.
1992	(Northern Ireland) Ronan Rafferty	278	−10	2 strokes	(Australia) Bradley Hughes (Australia) Brett Ogle	252,000	
1991	(New Zealand) Greg Turner	271	−17	4 strokes	(Australia) Greg Norman	216,000	
1990	(Australia) Rodger Davis	271	−17	Playoff	(United States) Curtis Strange	144,000	
1989	(United States) Curtis Strange	280	−8	2 strokes	(United States) Raymond Floyd	108,000	
1988	(Australia) Greg Norman	272	−16	1 stroke	(Japan) Tateo Ozaki	90,000	
