= Curtis Strange =

American professional golfer (born 1955)

Personal information
- Full name: Curtis Northrup Strange
- Nationality: United States
- Born: January 30, 1955 (age 71) Norfolk, Virginia, U.S.
- Height: 5 ft 11 in (180 cm)
- Weight: 180 lb (82 kg; 13 st)
- Spouse: Sarah Strange
- Children: 2 sons

Career
- Sport: Golf
- College: Wake Forest University
- Turned professional: 1976
- Former tours: PGA Tour; Champions Tour
- Professional wins: 29
- Highest ranking: 3 (June 19, 1988)

Number of wins by tour
- PGA Tour: 17
- European Tour: 2
- Japan Golf Tour: 1
- PGA Tour of Australasia: 3
- Other: 8

Best results in major championships (wins: 2)
- Masters Tournament: T2: 1985
- PGA Championship: T2: 1989
- U.S. Open: Won: 1988, 1989
- The Open Championship: T13: 1988

Achievements and awards
- World Golf Hall of Fame: 2007 (member page)
- Haskins Award: 1974
- PGA Tour money list winner: 1985, 1987, 1988
- PGA Player of the Year: 1988

Curtis Northrup Strange (born January 30, 1955) is an American professional golfer and TV color commentator. He is the winner of consecutive U.S. Open titles and a member of the World Golf Hall of Fame and Virginia Sports Hall of Fame. He spent over 200 weeks in the top-10 of the Official World Golf Ranking between their debut in 1986 and 1990.

== Early life ==
In 1955, Strange and his identical twin brother, Allan, were born in Norfolk, Virginia. Allan also briefly played as a professional golfer. His father, a local country club owner, started him in golf at age 7. Strange was a natural left-hander but learned to play golf as a right-hander.

In 1973, Strange graduated from Princess Anne High School in Virginia Beach.

== Amateur career ==
In the fall of 1973, Strange enrolled at Wake Forest University in Winston-Salem, North Carolina. He played golf for the Demon Deacons and was part of the NCAA Championship team with Jay Haas and Bob Byman that Golf World has labeled "the greatest of all time". In 1974 Strange was ranked the #2 amateur in the country by Golf Digest. The following year, he was ranked number #3.

In the spring of 1976, Strange intended to transition from amateur to professional despite still being a junior in college. At this point, he was known for having one of the best amateur careers of all time. According to the golf columnist for The Charlotte Observer, Richard Sink, "Strange, only a junior, will leave behind a collegiate record perhaps unmatched." He finished in the top ten in all of his 25 college matches and finished in the top 5 in 21 of those. He won nine individual events and was the youngest NCAA Champion in golf at the time. In 1976, he was ranked #9 amateur in the country by Golf Digest.

== Professional career ==
In 1976, Strange turned professional. He attempted to make it onto the PGA Tour at Fall 1976 PGA Tour Qualifying School. He was highly expected to make it into tour and was the favorite to earn medalist honors. However, Strange bogeyed the final three holes of the tournament to miss qualifying by a shot. Afterwards, Strange told The Item, "I thought it was the end of the world. It wasn't something I was ready for. I thought, 'Good God, what am I going to do.' I was scared."

Strange was one of the leading players on the PGA Tour in the 1980s; 16 of his 17 tour victories took place in that decade. He topped the money list in 1985, 1987, and 1988, when he became the first to win a million dollars in official money in a season. His two majors were consecutive U.S. Opens in 1988 and 1989. Since World War II, only three golfers have successfully defended their titles at the U.S. Open; Brooks Koepka in 2018, Strange in 1989, and Ben Hogan in 1951. The 1989 U.S. Open was Strange's last win on tour. In other majors, he led midway through the final round at The Masters in 1985, but finished two strokes back. Strange was also a runner-up at the PGA Championship in 1989, one stroke back. He played on five Ryder Cup teams (1983, 1985, 1987, 1989, and 1995) and captained the team in 2002.

Despite skipping the Open Championship several times in his prime, Strange played a considerable amount of international tournaments. He won the 1986 ABC Japan-U.S. Match, an event on the Japan Golf Tour that included many American pros. He also played extensively on the Australasian Tour. He won three events in Australia in the late 1980s and early 1990s and recorded runner-up finishes at the 1976 Australian Open, 1977 Colgate Champion of Champions, 1986 Air New Zealand Shell Open, and the 1990 Daikyo Palm Meadows Cup.

=== Broadcasting career ===
After reaching the age of 50 in January 2005, Strange began play on the Champions Tour, remarking, "I was getting worse and said, 'To hell with it.'" His only top-five finishes came that first season; third place at the Constellation Energy Classic and a tie for fifth at the FedEx Kinko's Classic. In 1997, he was hired as the lead golf analyst for ESPN/ABC, working alongside host Mike Tirico. He left due to a contract dispute before the 2004 U.S. Open, but rejoined ESPN/ABC at the 2008 U.S. Open, four years after he first left. In 2016, he was hired by Fox as a course reporter for their USGA championships.

In this capacity he has provided commentary for several notable events, including Tiger Woods' playoff win at the 1997 Mercedes Championships, David Duval's final round of 59 at the 1999 Bob Hope Chrysler Classic, Jean van de Velde's collapse at the 1999 Open Championship, Woods achieving the career grand slam at the 2000 Open Championship, Peter Jacobsen becoming one of the oldest Tour winners at age 49 during the 2003 Greater Hartford Open, Woods' U.S. Open winning performance in 2008 (early rounds), Tom Watson nearly winning The Open Championship at age 59 in 2009, and Phil Mickelson's final nine charge to win in 2013.

== Awards and honors ==
- In 1974, Strange won the Haskins Award, bestowed to the top college golfer of the year
- Strange led the PGA Tour money list three times: in 1985, 1987, and 1988
- In 1988, Strange was selected by fellow tour pros as the PGA Player of the Year
- In 2004, Strange was elected to the Virginia Sports Hall of Fame and Museum
- On April 18, 2007, Strange was elected to the World Golf Hall of Fame, and was inducted on November 12 at the World Golf Village in St. Augustine, Florida.
- In May 2009, he was named to the Hampton Roads Sports Hall of Fame, which honors athletes, coaches and administrators who contributed to sports in southeastern Virginia.

== Amateur wins ==
- 1974 Western Amateur, North and South Amateur, NCAA Division I Championship
- 1975 North and South Amateur, Eastern Amateur

== Professional wins (29) ==
=== PGA Tour wins (17) ===
Legend
Major championships (2)
Tour Championships (1)
Other PGA Tour (14)

No.	Date	Tournament	Winning score	To par	Margin of victory	Runner(s)-up
1	Oct 21, 1979	Pensacola Open	69-71-62-69=271	−17	1 stroke	(United States) Billy Kratzert
2	May 4, 1980	Michelob-Houston Open	66-63-66-71=266	−18	Playoff	(United States) Lee Trevino
3	Aug 17, 1980	Manufacturers Hanover Westchester Classic	69-65-70-69=273	−11	2 strokes	(United States) Gibby Gilbert
4	Aug 21, 1983	Sammy Davis Jr.-Greater Hartford Open	69-62-69-68=268	−16	1 stroke	(United States) Jay Haas, (United States) Jack Renner
5	Sep 30, 1984	LaJet Golf Classic	68-67-67-71=273	−15	2 strokes	(United States) Mark O'Meara
6	Mar 3, 1985	Honda Classic	67-64-70-74=275	−13	Playoff	(United States) Peter Jacobsen
7	Mar 24, 1985	Panasonic Las Vegas Invitational	69-73-64-66-66=338	−17	1 stroke	(United States) Mike Smith
8	Jul 7, 1985	Canadian Open	69-69-68-73=279	−9	2 strokes	(United States) Jack Nicklaus, (Australia) Greg Norman
9	Apr 27, 1986	Houston Open (2)	72-68-68-66=274	−14	Playoff	(United States) Calvin Peete
10	Jul 5, 1987	Canadian Open (2)	71-70-66-69=276	−12	3 strokes	(South Africa) David Frost, (United States) Jodie Mudd, (Zimbabwe) Nick Price
11	Aug 2, 1987	Federal Express St. Jude Classic	70-68-68-69=275	−13	1 stroke	(United States) Russ Cochran, (United States) Mike Donald, (United States) Tom Kite, (Zimbabwe) Denis Watson
12	Aug 30, 1987	NEC World Series of Golf	70-66-68-71=275	−5	3 strokes	(South Africa) Fulton Allem
13	May 1, 1988	Independent Insurance Agent Open	69-68-66-67=270	−18	Playoff	(Australia) Greg Norman
14	May 29, 1988	Memorial Tournament	73-70-64-67=274	−14	2 strokes	(South Africa) David Frost, (United States) Hale Irwin
15	Jun 20, 1988	U.S. Open	70-67-69-72=278	−6	Playoff	(England) Nick Faldo
16	Nov 14, 1988	Nabisco Championship	64-71-70-74=279	−9	Playoff	(United States) Tom Kite
17	Jun 18, 1989	U.S. Open (2)	71-64-73-70=278	−2	1 stroke	(United States) Chip Beck, (United States) Mark McCumber, (Wales) Ian Woosnam

PGA Tour playoff record (6–3)

No.	Year	Tournament	Opponent(s)	Result
1	1980	Michelob-Houston Open	(United States) Lee Trevino	Won with birdie on first extra hole
2	1981	Tournament Players Championship	(United States) Raymond Floyd, (United States) Barry Jaeckel	Floyd won with par on first extra hole
3	1983	Joe Garagiola-Tucson Open	(United States) Gil Morgan, (United States) Lanny Wadkins	Morgan won with birdie on second extra hole
4	1985	Honda Classic	(United States) Peter Jacobsen	Won with par on first extra hole
5	1986	Houston Open	(United States) Calvin Peete	Won with birdie on third extra hole
6	1988	Independent Insurance Agent Open	(Australia) Greg Norman	Won with birdie on third extra hole
7	1988	U.S. Open	(England) Nick Faldo	Won 18-hole playoff; Strange: E (71), Faldo: +4 (75)
8	1988	Nabisco Championship	(United States) Tom Kite	Won with birdie on second extra hole
9	1991	Doral-Ryder Open	(United States) Rocco Mediate	Lost to birdie on first extra hole

=== PGA of Japan Tour wins (1) ===
No.	Date	Tournament	Winning score	To par	Margin of victory	Runner-up
1	Nov 2, 1986	ABC Japan-U.S. Match	67-68-72-64=271	−17	4 strokes	(United States) Chip Beck

=== PGA Tour of Australasia wins (3) ===
No.	Date	Tournament	Winning score	To par	Margin of victory	Runner-up
1	Jan 10, 1988	Sanctuary Cove Classic	67-70-67-68=272	−16	1 stroke	(Wales) Ian Woosnam
2	Jan 15, 1989	Daikyo Palm Meadows Cup	66-70-71-73=280	−8	2 strokes	(United States) Raymond Floyd
3	Dec 5, 1993	Greg Norman's Holden Classic	68-67-69-70=274	−18	2 strokes	(Australia) John Wade

PGA Tour of Australasia playoff record (0–1)

No.	Year	Tournament	Opponent	Result
1	1990	Daikyo Palm Meadows Cup	(Australia) Rodger Davis	Lost to eagle on second extra hole

=== South American Golf Circuit wins (1) ===
- 1981 Panama Open

=== Other wins (7) ===
No.	Date	Tournament	Winning score	To par	Margin of victory	Runner(s)-up
1	Oct 5, 1980	Laurent-Perrier Trophy	62-70-68-68=268	−20	12 strokes	(United States) Bobby Clampett
2	Dec 14, 1980	JCPenney Mixed Team Classic (with (United States) Nancy Lopez)	70-65-67-66=268	−20	2 strokes	(United States) Gibby Gilbert and (United States) Sandra Spuzich, (United States) Lori Garbacz and (United States) Craig Stadler
3	Aug 19, 1986	Fred Meyer Challenge (with (United States) Peter Jacobsen)	64	−8	Shared title with (Australia) Greg Norman and (South Africa) Gary Player	
4	May 26, 1989	PGA Grand Slam of Golf	73	+1	2 strokes	(United States) Craig Stadler
5	Nov 19, 1989	RMCC Invitational (with (United States) Mark O'Meara)	66-62-62=190	−26	6 strokes	(West Germany) Bernhard Langer and (United States) John Mahaffey, (United States) Lanny Wadkins and (United States) Tom Weiskopf
6	Nov 26, 1989	Skins Game	$265,000		$175,000	(United States) Jack Nicklaus
7	Nov 25, 1990	Skins Game (2)	$220,000		$130,000	(Australia) Greg Norman

== Major championships ==
=== Wins (2) ===
Year	Championship	54 holes	Winning score	Margin	Runner(s)-up
1988	U.S. Open	1 shot lead	−6 (70-67-69-72=278)	Playoff^{1}	(England) Nick Faldo
1989	U.S. Open (2)	3 shot deficit	−2 (71-64-73-70=278)	1 stroke	(United States) Chip Beck, (United States) Mark McCumber, (Wales) Ian Woosnam

^{1}Defeated Faldo in 18-hole playoff; Strange: 71 (E), Faldo: 75 (+4).

=== Results timeline ===
Tournament	1975	1976	1977	1978	1979
Masters Tournament	CUT	T15 LA	CUT		
U.S. Open			CUT		
The Open Championship		CUT			
PGA Championship				T58	CUT

Tournament	1980	1981	1982	1983	1984	1985	1986	1987	1988	1989
Masters Tournament	CUT	T19	T7	CUT	T46	T2	T21	T12	T21	T18
U.S. Open	T16	T17	T39	T26	3	T31	CUT	T4	1	1
The Open Championship			T15	T29			T14		T13	T61
PGA Championship	T5	T27	T14	86	CUT	CUT	CUT	9	T31	T2

Tournament	1990	1991	1992	1993	1994	1995	1996	1997	1998	1999
Masters Tournament	T7	T42	T31	WD	T27	9	CUT			
U.S. Open	T21	CUT	T23	T25	4	T36	T27	CUT	CUT	CUT
The Open Championship	CUT	T38	CUT			CUT	T72	T44	T19	
PGA Championship	CUT	WD	CUT	CUT	T19	T17	T26	CUT		

Tournament	2000	2001	2002
Masters Tournament			
U.S. Open	CUT		
The Open Championship			
PGA Championship	T58	CUT	CUT

Win
Top 10
Did not play

LA = Low amateur
CUT = missed the halfway cut
WD = withdrew
"T" indicates a tie for a place.

=== Summary ===
Tournament	Wins	2nd	3rd	Top-5	Top-10	Top-25	Events	Cuts made
Masters Tournament	0	1	0	1	4	10	20	14
U.S. Open	2	0	1	5	5	10	22	15
The Open Championship	0	0	0	0	0	4	13	9
PGA Championship	0	1	0	2	3	6	23	12
Totals	2	2	1	8	12	30	78	50

- Most consecutive cuts made – 13 (1987 Masters – 1990 U.S. Open)
- Longest streak of top-10s – 2 (twice)

== Results in The Players Championship ==
Tournament	1978	1979	1980	1981	1982	1983	1984	1985	1986	1987	1988	1989	1990	1991	1992	1993	1994	1995	1996	1997	1998	1999
The Players Championship	CUT	CUT	21	T2	T51	T8	T33	T33	CUT	CUT	DQ	T34	T16	T6	WD	CUT	CUT	T23	CUT	CUT	CUT	T23

Top 10

CUT = missed the halfway cut
WD = withdrew
DQ = disqualified
"T" indicates a tie for a place

== U.S. national team appearances ==
Amateur

- Eisenhower Trophy: 1974 (winners)
- Walker Cup: 1975 (winners)

Professional

- Ryder Cup: 1983 (winners), 1985, 1987, 1989 (tied), 1995, 2002 (non-playing captain)
- Dunhill Cup: 1985, 1987, 1988, 1989 (winners), 1990, 1991, 1994
- Four Tours World Championship: 1985 (winners), 1987 (winners), 1988 (winners), 1989 (winners)
- UBS Cup: 2001 (winners), 2002 (winners), 2003 (tie), 2004 (winners)

== Equipment ==
In 1988 when Strange won the U.S. Open, Ping recognized him with a golden putter replica of the Ping Zing 2 he used to win. A second one was made and placed in the Ping Gold Putter Vault.

== See also ==
- Spring 1977 PGA Tour Qualifying School graduates
