= Scott Verplank =

American professional golfer (born 1964)

Personal information
- Full name: Scott Rachal Verplank
- Nationality: United States
- Born: July 9, 1964 (age 62) Dallas, Texas, U.S.
- Height: 5 ft 9 in (1.75 m)
- Weight: 165 lb (75 kg; 11.8 st)
- Spouse: Kim Verplank
- Children: 4

Career
- Sport: Golf
- College: Oklahoma State University
- Turned professional: 1986
- Current tour: PGA Tour Champions
- Former tour: PGA Tour
- Professional wins: 6
- Highest ranking: 11 (October 21, 2001)

Number of wins by tour
- PGA Tour: 5
- Other: 1

Best results in major championships
- Masters Tournament: T8: 2003
- PGA Championship: T4: 2011
- U.S. Open: T7: 2007
- The Open Championship: T7: 2004

Achievements and awards
- Haskins Award: 1986
- PGA Tour Comeback Player of the Year: 1998
- Ben Hogan Award: 2002
- NCAA Silver Anniversary Award: 2011

Scott Rachal Verplank (born July 9, 1964) is an American professional golfer, who has played on the PGA Tour and the PGA Tour Champions.

== Early life ==
Born and raised in Dallas, Texas, Verplank was a leading member of the W.T. White High School golf team and a regular at Brookhaven Country Club in Dallas. He graduated from high school in 1982.

== Amateur career ==
Verplank attended Oklahoma State University in Stillwater. At OSU, he was a member of the 1983 NCAA Championship team, finishing T3 alongside teammates Tommy Moore, Willie Wood, Andy Dillard, and Philip Walton. He went on later to win the 1984 U.S. Amateur and 1986 NCAA individual title.

Prior to his senior year at Oklahoma State, Verplank won the Western Open outside Chicago in August 1985; it was the first victory by an amateur on the PGA Tour in 29 years. He defeated Jim Thorpe on the second extra hole of a playoff for the win at Butler National Golf Club in Oak Brook, Illinois.

== Professional career ==
Verplank graduated and turned professional in 1986, using his two-year exemption on the PGA Tour; his first event as a pro was the U.S. Open at Shinnecock Hills in June, his sixth tour event that year. He earned five wins on the PGA Tour, and two Ryder Cup appearances, in 2002 and 2006. Verplank has type 1 diabetes and uses an insulin pump during play. He was awarded the 2002 Ben Hogan Award, given by the Golf Writers Association of America to an individual who has continued to be active in golf despite a physical handicap or serious illness. Verplank has been featured in the top 20 of the Official World Golf Rankings, reaching as high as eleventh in 2001.

He hit a hole-in-one in the Ryder Cup, on the 14th hole during a singles match against Pádraig Harrington in 2006. The shot did not impact the overall result, however, as Europe had already won the trophy. Nonetheless, he was the first American player to card an ace during the Ryder Cup; his overall record in the competition is 4 wins and 1 loss.

Verplank's most recent win was the 2007 EDS Byron Nelson Championship, in which he defeated Luke Donald by one stroke. As a Dallas native, Verplank called the EDS Byron Nelson Championship "a fifth major," and also mentioned that "Byron was with me today" (the 2007 tournament was the first held after Nelson's death). His best finish in a major championship was a tie for fourth at the PGA Championship in 2011.

Verplank competed in the 2011 Arnold Palmer Invitational finishing T38 and then the following week at the Shell Houston Open in which Verplank finished T2 behind Phil Mickelson. Verplank had held a joint 54-hole lead with Mickelson and even held the lead on his own at a number of stages during the final round, however his lack of competitive golf proved costly throughout the final few holes and he was unable to close out the victory. This was his best finish on tour in 18 months since finishing T2 at the Deutsche Bank Championship in 2009. Verplank has amassed over $27 million in career earnings.

Verplank played the 2013 season on a Major Medical Extension after hip and wrist injuries in 2012. He started the 2014 season in a similar fashion, but was not able to satisfy the medical exemption and used his career money list exemption for the remainder of the season. Verplank turned 50 in July 2014 and made his Champions Tour debut at the U.S. Senior Open at Oak Tree National, near his residence in Edmond, Oklahoma.

== Awards and honors ==
In December 2010, Verplank was named a 2011 winner of the NCAA Silver Anniversary Award, given annually to six former NCAA student-athletes for distinguished career accomplishment on the 25th anniversary of their college graduation.

== Amateur wins ==
- 1983 Porter Cup
- 1984 U.S. Amateur, Sunnehanna Amateur
- 1985 Western Amateur, Sunnehanna Amateur, Porter Cup
- 1986 NCAA individual title

== Professional wins (6) ==
=== PGA Tour wins (5) ===
No.	Date	Tournament	Winning score	To par	Margin of victory	Runner(s)-up
1	Aug 4, 1985	Western Open (as an amateur)	68-68-69-74=279	−9	Playoff	(United States) Jim Thorpe
2	Jul 31, 1988	Buick Open	66-66-70-66=268	−20	2 strokes	(United States) Doug Tewell
3	Aug 27, 2000	Reno–Tahoe Open	69-68-71-67=275	−13	Playoff	(France) Jean van de Velde
4	Sep 9, 2001	Bell Canadian Open	70-63-66-67=266	−14	3 strokes	(United States) Joey Sindelar, (United States) Bob Estes
5	Apr 29, 2007	EDS Byron Nelson Championship	67-68-66-66=267	−13	1 stroke	(England) Luke Donald

PGA Tour playoff record (2–4)

No.	Year	Tournament	Opponent(s)	Result
1	1985	Western Open	(United States) Jim Thorpe	Won with par on second extra hole
2	1998	Greater Greensboro Chrysler Classic	(Namibia) Trevor Dodds	Lost to par on first extra hole
3	2000	Reno–Tahoe Open	(France) Jean van de Velde	Won with birdie on fourth extra hole
4	2001	Verizon Byron Nelson Classic	(United States) Robert Damron	Lost to birdie on fourth extra hole
5	2004	Ford Championship at Doral	(Australia) Craig Parry	Lost to eagle on first extra hole
6	2010	Travelers Championship	(United States) Corey Pavin, (United States) Bubba Watson	Watson won with par on second extra hole Pavin eliminated by par on first hole

=== Other wins (1) ===
No.	Date	Tournament	Winning score	To par	Margin of victory	Runners-up
1	Nov 22, 1998	World Cup of Golf Individual Trophy	70-72-74-63=279	−9	1 stroke	(England) Nick Faldo, (Italy) Costantino Rocca

Other playoff record (0–1)

No.	Year	Tournament	Opponents	Result
1	2006	Merrill Lynch Shootout (with (United States) Justin Leonard)	(United States) Jerry Kelly and (Australia) Rod Pampling	Lost to bogey on first extra hole

== Results in major championships ==
Tournament	1985	1986	1987	1988	1989
Masters Tournament	CUT	CUT	CUT		CUT
U.S. Open	T34LA	T15	CUT		
The Open Championship		CUT		CUT	
PGA Championship				CUT	CUT

Tournament	1990	1991	1992	1993	1994	1995	1996	1997	1998	1999
Masters Tournament										CUT
U.S. Open	T61				T18	T21			T49	T17
The Open Championship										T15
PGA Championship	T31					CUT			T54	T34

Tournament	2000	2001	2002	2003	2004	2005	2006	2007	2008	2009
Masters Tournament		CUT	43	T8	29	T20	T16	T30	CUT	
U.S. Open	T46	T22	CUT	T10	T40	CUT	CUT	T7	T29	
The Open Championship	CUT	T30	T37	CUT	T7	T23	T31	T57	T58	
PGA Championship	CUT	T7	CUT	CUT	T62	T34	CUT	T9	CUT	CUT

Tournament	2010	2011	2012
Masters Tournament	T18		T54
U.S. Open	T47		
The Open Championship	T76		
PGA Championship	CUT	T4	WD

Top 10
Did not play

LA = Low amateur
CUT = missed the half-way cut
WD = withdrew
"T" = tied

=== Summary ===
Tournament	Wins	2nd	3rd	Top-5	Top-10	Top-25	Events	Cuts made
Masters Tournament	0	0	0	0	1	4	15	8
U.S. Open	0	0	0	0	2	7	18	14
The Open Championship	0	0	0	0	1	3	13	9
PGA Championship	0	0	0	1	3	3	19	8
Totals	0	0	0	1	7	17	65	39

- Most consecutive cuts made – 5 (2004 Masters – 2005 Masters)
- Longest streak of top-10s – 2 (2003 Masters – 2003 U.S. Open)

== Results in The Players Championship ==
Tournament	1986	1987	1988	1989	1990	1991	1992	1993	1994	1995	1996	1997	1998	1999
The Players Championship	CUT			CUT		CUT				CUT	WD		T11	T32

Tournament	2000	2001	2002	2003	2004	2005	2006	2007	2008	2009	2010	2011	2012
The Players Championship	T20	T44	T28	T8	T26	T2	CUT	T44	CUT	T49	T13	T54	WD

Top 10
Did not play

CUT = missed the halfway cut
WD = withdrew
"T" indicates a tie for a place

== Results in World Golf Championships ==
Tournament	1999	2000	2001	2002	2003	2004	2005	2006	2007	2008	2009	2010
Match Play	R32		R32	R32	R64	R64	R64	R32	R64	R64		R64
Championship		T48	NT^{1}	T15	T51	T54	T62	T38		T40		T30
Invitational			T17	T58	T46	T19	T51	T59	T9	T20	T51	T39
Champions												

^{1}Cancelled due to 9/11

Top 10
Did not play

QF, R16, R32, R64 = Round in which player lost in match play
"T" = Tied
NT = No tournament
Note that the HSBC Champions did not become a WGC event until 2009.

== U.S. national team appearances ==
Amateur

- Eisenhower Trophy: 1984
- Walker Cup: 1985 (winners)

Professional

- World Cup: 1998 (individual title), 2004
- Ryder Cup: 2002, 2006
- Presidents Cup: 2005 (winners), 2007 (winners)
- Wendy's 3-Tour Challenge (representing PGA Tour): 2006 (winners)

== See also ==
- 1987 PGA Tour Qualifying School graduates
- 1997 PGA Tour Qualifying School graduates
