= Vardon Trophy =

Award to the PGA Tour's scoring average leader

The Vardon Trophy was awarded by the PGA of America to the PGA Tour's leader in scoring average. When the award was first given in 1937, it was awarded on the basis of a points system. No award was given from 1942–1946 due to World War II. In 1947, the PGA began awarding it for low scoring average. In 1988, the trophy began going to the golfer with the lowest adjusted scoring average over a minimum of 60 rounds, with no mid-round withdrawals (instituted in 1988). The PGA of America last presented the award in 2022. The trophy was named for the Jersey golfing great Harry Vardon, who died in 1937.

The PGA Tour presents its own Byron Nelson Award annually to the player with the lowest adjusted scoring average for the year. It has a 50-round minimum, and was instituted in 1980.

For both awards, non-medal rounds (such as in the WGC-Accenture Match Play Championship and The International) count towards the minimum number of rounds but are not included in the calculation of the scoring average.

Differences in the eligibility criteria for the awards have resulted in different players winning the awards on six occasions. In 1988, 1993, and 1995, Greg Norman won the Byron Nelson Award but not the Vardon Trophy because he failed to meet the 60 round minimum for the Vardon Trophy (52, 54, and 58 rounds, respectively). This also happened to Tiger Woods in 2006 (55 rounds) and Steve Stricker in 2013 (51 rounds). In 1989, Payne Stewart failed to qualify for the Vardon Trophy because of his mid-round withdrawal from the AT&T Pebble Beach National Pro-Am. In 1987, Dan Pohl won the Vardon Trophy even though David Frost and Paul Azinger both had lower averages; Frost and Azinger were not PGA of America members, a requirement for eligibility that was dropped after the 1987 season. The minimum rounds required also dropped from 80 to 60 at that time.

For the 2019–20 season, the minimum rounds required to be eligible for the trophy was reduced from 60 to 44, due to cancellation of tournaments because of the COVID-19 pandemic. The minimum rounds for the Byron Nelson Award dropped from 50 to 35.

== Winners ==
Year	Vardon Trophy	Adjusted Scoring Average (60 round minimum)	Byron Nelson Award	Adjusted Scoring Average (50 round minimum)
2025	No award		(United States) Scottie Scheffler	68.13
2024	No award		(United States) Scottie Scheffler	68.65
2023	No award		(United States) Scottie Scheffler	68.63
2022	(Northern Ireland) Rory McIlroy	68.67	(Northern Ireland) Rory McIlroy	68.67
2021	(Spain) Jon Rahm	69.30	(Spain) Jon Rahm	69.30
2020	(United States) Webb Simpson	68.98	(United States) Webb Simpson	68.98
2019	(Northern Ireland) Rory McIlroy	69.06	(Northern Ireland) Rory McIlroy	69.06
2018	(United States) Dustin Johnson	68.70	(United States) Dustin Johnson	68.70
2017	(United States) Jordan Spieth	68.85	(United States) Jordan Spieth	68.85
2016	(United States) Dustin Johnson	69.17	(United States) Dustin Johnson	69.17
2015	(United States) Jordan Spieth	68.91	(United States) Jordan Spieth	68.91
2014	(Northern Ireland) Rory McIlroy	68.83	(Northern Ireland) Rory McIlroy	68.83
2013	(United States) Tiger Woods	68.98	(United States) Steve Stricker	68.95
2012	(Northern Ireland) Rory McIlroy	68.87	(Northern Ireland) Rory McIlroy	68.87
2011	(England) Luke Donald	68.86	(England) Luke Donald	68.86
2010	(United States) Matt Kuchar	69.61	(United States) Matt Kuchar	69.61
2009	(United States) Tiger Woods	68.05	(United States) Tiger Woods	68.05
2008	(Spain) Sergio García	69.12	(Spain) Sergio García	69.12
2007	(United States) Tiger Woods	67.79	(United States) Tiger Woods	67.79
2006	(United States) Jim Furyk	68.86	(United States) Tiger Woods	68.11
2005	(United States) Tiger Woods	68.66	(United States) Tiger Woods	68.66
2004	(Fiji) Vijay Singh	68.84	(Fiji) Vijay Singh	68.84
2003	(United States) Tiger Woods	68.41	(United States) Tiger Woods	68.41
2002	(United States) Tiger Woods	68.56	(United States) Tiger Woods	68.56
2001	(United States) Tiger Woods	68.81	(United States) Tiger Woods	68.81
2000	(United States) Tiger Woods	67.79	(United States) Tiger Woods	67.79
1999	(United States) Tiger Woods	68.43	(United States) Tiger Woods	68.43
1998	(United States) David Duval	69.13	(United States) David Duval	69.13
1997	(Zimbabwe) Nick Price	68.98	(Zimbabwe) Nick Price	68.98
1996	(United States) Tom Lehman	69.32	(United States) Tom Lehman	69.32
1995	(Australia) Steve Elkington	69.92	(Australia) Greg Norman	69.06
1994	(Australia) Greg Norman	68.81	(Australia) Greg Norman	68.81
1993	(Zimbabwe) Nick Price	69.11	(Australia) Greg Norman	68.90
1992	(United States) Fred Couples	69.38	(United States) Fred Couples	69.38
1991	(United States) Fred Couples	69.59	(United States) Fred Couples	69.38
1990	(Australia) Greg Norman	69.10	(Australia) Greg Norman	69.10
1989	(Australia) Greg Norman	69.49	(United States) Payne Stewart	69.485
1988	(United States) Chip Beck	69.46	(Australia) Greg Norman	69.38
Year	Winner	Scoring Average (80 round minimum)	Byron Nelson Award	Scoring Average (50 round minimum)
1987	(United States) Dan Pohl	70.25	(South Africa) David Frost	70.09
1986	(United States) Scott Hoch	70.08	(United States) Scott Hoch	70.08
1985	(United States) Don Pooley	70.36	(United States) Don Pooley	70.36
1984	(United States) Calvin Peete	70.56	(United States) Calvin Peete	70.56
1983	(United States) Raymond Floyd	70.61	(United States) Raymond Floyd	70.61
1982	(United States) Tom Kite	70.21	(United States) Tom Kite	70.21
1981	(United States) Tom Kite	69.80	(United States) Tom Kite	69.80
1980	(United States) Lee Trevino	69.73	(United States) Lee Trevino	69.73

Year	Winner	Scoring Average
1979	(United States) Tom Watson	70.27
1978	(United States) Tom Watson	70.16
1977	(United States) Tom Watson	70.32
1976	(United States) Don January	70.56
1975	(Australia) Bruce Crampton	70.57
1974	(United States) Lee Trevino	70.53
1973	(Australia) Bruce Crampton	70.57
1972	(United States) Lee Trevino	70.89
1971	(United States) Lee Trevino	70.27
1970	(United States) Lee Trevino	70.64
1969	(United States) Dave Hill	70.34
1968	(United States) Billy Casper	69.82
1967	(United States) Arnold Palmer	70.18
1966	(United States) Billy Casper	70.27
1965	(United States) Billy Casper	70.85
1964	(United States) Arnold Palmer	70.01
1963	(United States) Billy Casper	70.58
1962	(United States) Arnold Palmer	70.27
1961	(United States) Arnold Palmer	69.85
1960	(United States) Billy Casper	69.95
1959	(United States) Art Wall Jr.	70.35
1958	(United States) Bob Rosburg	70.11
1957	(United States) Dow Finsterwald	70.30
1956	(United States) Cary Middlecoff	70.35
1955	(United States) Sam Snead	69.86
1954	(United States) Dutch Harrison	70.41
1953	(United States) Lloyd Mangrum	70.22
1952	(United States) Jack Burke Jr.	70.54
1951	(United States) Lloyd Mangrum	70.05
1950	(United States) Sam Snead	69.23
1949	(United States) Sam Snead	69.37
1948	(United States) Ben Hogan	69.30
1947	(United States) Jimmy Demaret	69.90

Year	Winner	Points
1941	(United States) Ben Hogan	494
1940	(United States) Ben Hogan	423
1939	(United States) Byron Nelson	473
1938	(United States) Sam Snead	520
1937	(United States) Harry Cooper	500

== Multiple winners ==
Sixteen men have won the Vardon Trophy more than once (1937–2022).

- 9 wins
  - Tiger Woods: 1999, 2000, 2001, 2002, 2003, 2005, 2007, 2009, 2013
- 5 wins
  - Billy Casper: 1960, 1963, 1965, 1966, 1968
  - Lee Trevino: 1970, 1971, 1972, 1974, 1980
- 4 wins
  - Arnold Palmer: 1961, 1962, 1964, 1967
  - Sam Snead: 1938, 1949, 1950, 1955
  - Rory McIlroy: 2012, 2014, 2019, 2022
- 3 wins
  - Ben Hogan: 1940, 1941, 1948
  - Greg Norman: 1989, 1990, 1994
  - Tom Watson: 1977, 1978, 1979
- 2 wins
  - Fred Couples: 1991, 1992
  - Bruce Crampton: 1973, 1975
  - Dustin Johnson: 2016, 2018
  - Tom Kite: 1981, 1982
  - Lloyd Mangrum: 1951, 1953
  - Nick Price: 1993, 1997
  - Jordan Spieth: 2015, 2017

Seven men have won the Byron Nelson Award more than once (1980–2025).

- 9 wins
  - Tiger Woods: 1999, 2000, 2001, 2002, 2003, 2005, 2006, 2007, 2009
- 5 wins
  - Greg Norman: 1988, 1990, 1993, 1994, 1995
- 4 wins
  - Rory McIlroy: 2012, 2014, 2019, 2022
- 3 wins
  - Scottie Scheffler: 2023, 2024, 2025
- 2 wins
  - Fred Couples: 1991, 1992
  - Dustin Johnson: 2016, 2018
  - Tom Kite: 1981, 1982
  - Jordan Spieth: 2015, 2017
