= Chip Beck =

American professional golfer (born 1956)

Personal information
- Full name: Charles Henry Beck
- Nickname: Chip
- Nationality: United States
- Born: September 12, 1956 (age 70) Fayetteville, North Carolina, U.S.
- Height: 5 ft 10 in (1.78 m)
- Weight: 170 lb (77 kg; 12 st)

Career
- Sport: Golf
- College: University of Georgia
- Turned professional: 1978
- Current tour: Champions Tour
- Former tour: PGA Tour
- Professional wins: 5
- Highest ranking: 8 (February 12, 1989)

Number of wins by tour
- PGA Tour: 4
- Other: 1

Best results in major championships
- Masters Tournament: 2nd: 1993
- PGA Championship: T5: 1990
- U.S. Open: T2: 1986, 1989
- The Open Championship: T12: 1992

Achievements and awards
- Vardon Trophy: 1988
- Champions Tour Comeback Player of the Year: 2011

Charles Henry "Chip" Beck (born September 12, 1956) is an American professional golfer. He has four victories on the PGA Tour and twenty runner-up finishes. He spent 40 weeks in the top 10 of the Official World Golf Rankings between 1988 and 1989 and was the second player to shoot a 59 on the PGA Tour.

== Early life and amateur career ==
Beck was born in Fayetteville, North Carolina. He was a three-time All-American at the University of Georgia.

== Professional career ==
Beck's early professional career was very strong. He finished joint runner-up at the 1986 U.S. Open and 1989 U.S. Open. Beck was a three-time Ryder Cup participant during this era, playing in the 1989 Ryder Cup, 1991 Ryder Cup, and 1993 Ryder Cup. He won the Vardon Trophy in 1988.

He shot a round of 59 in the third round of the 1991 Las Vegas Invitational at the par-72 Sunrise Golf Club in Las Vegas, Nevada. It was the second 59 in the history of the PGA Tour. Beck's round included 5 pars and 13 birdies. This included a three-foot birdie on the 18th hole. Beck finished tied for third in the tournament.

Beck was also the solo runner-up at the 1993 Masters, four behind champion Bernhard Langer.

His later career was not as dominant. He missed 46 consecutive PGA Tour cuts from 1997 to 1998 and eventually left the PGA Tour to become an insurance salesman.

Beck shot a hole-in-one (also a double eagle) at the par-4 9th hole in the first round of the 2003 Omaha Classic, a Nationwide Tour event. It was the first hole-in-one in the history of the developmental tour and second recorded in the history of the PGA Tour umbrella combined.

In 2006, Beck became eligible for the Champions Tour and enjoyed newfound success. In 2015, he stepped away from competition to become an ambassador at Grey Oaks Country Club in Naples, Florida.

== Personal life ==
Beck currently resides in Lake Forest, Illinois.

== Professional wins (5) ==
=== PGA Tour wins (4) ===
No.	Date	Tournament	Winning score	Margin of victory	Runner(s)-up
1	Feb 28, 1988	Los Angeles Open	−17 (65-69-65-68=267)	4 strokes	(United States) Mac O'Grady
2	Apr 24, 1988	USF&G Classic	−26 (69-64-65-64=262)	7 strokes	(United States) Lanny Wadkins
3	Jul 29, 1990	Buick Open	−16 (66-70-71-65=272)	1 stroke	(United States) Mike Donald, (United States) Hale Irwin, (United States) Fuzzy Zoeller
4	Apr 5, 1992	Freeport-McMoRan Golf Classic	−12 (67-65-74-70=276)	1 stroke	(Australia) Greg Norman, (United States) Mike Standly

PGA Tour playoff record (0–2)

No.	Year	Tournament	Opponent	Result
1	1988	Walt Disney World/Oldsmobile Classic	(United States) Bob Lohr	Lost to par on fifth extra hole
2	1991	Buick Open	(United States) Brad Faxon	Lost to par on first extra hole

=== Japan Senior Tour wins (1) ===
- 2007 Kinojyo Senior Open

== Results in major championships ==
Tournament	1980	1981	1982	1983	1984	1985	1986	1987	1988	1989
Masters Tournament				T32	CUT			T12	T21	T8
U.S. Open	T58	CUT	T12	T10	T21		T2	CUT	21	T2
The Open Championship			CUT						T28	T26
PGA Championship			CUT	T23	T25	CUT	T16	T57	T31	T34

Tournament	1990	1991	1992	1993	1994	1995	1996	1997	1998
Masters Tournament	T39	CUT	CUT	2	T15	T35			
U.S. Open	T29	CUT	CUT	T25	T25	CUT			CUT
The Open Championship	CUT	T17	T12	CUT	CUT				
PGA Championship	T5	T23	CUT	CUT	T36	T44			

Top 10
Did not play

CUT = missed the half way cut (3rd round cut in 1982 Open Championship)
"T" indicates a tie for a place.

=== Summary ===
Tournament	Wins	2nd	3rd	Top-5	Top-10	Top-25	Events	Cuts made
Masters Tournament	0	1	0	1	2	5	11	8
U.S. Open	0	2	0	2	3	8	16	10
The Open Championship	0	0	0	0	0	2	8	4
PGA Championship	0	0	0	1	1	4	14	10
Totals	0	3	0	4	6	19	49	32

- Most consecutive cuts made – 11 (1987 PGA – 1990 U.S. Open)
- Longest streak of top-10s – 2 (1989 Masters – 1989 U.S. Open)

== Results in The Players Championship ==
Tournament	1981	1982	1983	1984	1985	1986	1987	1988	1989	1990	1991	1992	1993	1994	1995	1996	1997
The Players Championship	CUT	CUT	CUT	T29	CUT	CUT	T44	T11	2	T66	T52	T49	CUT	T27	T61	T60	CUT

Top 10

CUT = missed the halfway cut
"T" indicates a tie for a place

== U.S. national team appearances ==
Professional

- Dunhill Cup: 1988
- Four Tours World Championship: 1988 (winners), 1989 (winners)
- Ryder Cup: 1989 (tie), 1991 (winners), 1993 (winners)

== See also ==
- Fall 1978 PGA Tour Qualifying School graduates
- Fall 1979 PGA Tour Qualifying School graduates
- Lowest rounds of golf
