= Mark McCumber =

American professional golfer (born 1951)

Personal information
- Full name: Mark Randall McCumber
- Nationality: United States
- Born: September 7, 1951 (age 75) Jacksonville, Florida, U.S.
- Height: 5 ft 8 in (1.73 m)
- Weight: 170 lb (77 kg; 12 st)

Career
- Sport: Golf
- Turned professional: 1974
- Former tours: PGA Tour; Champions Tour
- Professional wins: 11
- Highest ranking: 13 (May 14, 1995)

Number of wins by tour
- PGA Tour: 10
- Other: 1

Best results in major championships
- Masters Tournament: T11: 1986
- PGA Championship: T5: 1987
- U.S. Open: T2: 1989
- The Open Championship: T2: 1996

Mark Randall McCumber (born September 7, 1951) is an American professional golfer who has played on the PGA Tour and Champions Tour.

== Career ==
McCumber was born and raised in Jacksonville, Florida. He attended Robert E. Lee High School.

In 1974, he turned professional. He joined the PGA Tour in 1978. McCumber won ten times on the PGA Tour between 1979 and 1994 including the prestigious Players Championship (1988) and Tour Championship (1994). He also won the World Cup for the United States in partnership with Ben Crenshaw in 1988. He played on the 1989 Ryder Cup team.

McCumber worked as an on-course reporter for NBC Sports in 1991 and for ABC Sports part-time in 1998 and full-time in 1999.

After turning 50 in 2001, McCumber played on the Champions Tour from 2001 to 2008, but did not win an event in this venue. He also works as a golf course architect and was occasionally featured as a golf analyst on Fox Sports. McCumber is a member of the American Society of Golf Course Architects.

== Personal life ==
McCumber and his wife, Paddy, have two daughters and a son. Their son, Tyler, is also a professional golfer. McCumber is a devout Jehovah's Witness who preaches in his spare time.

== Professional wins (11) ==
=== PGA Tour wins (10) ===
Legend
Players Championships (1)
Tour Championships (1)
Other PGA Tour (8)

No.	Date	Tournament	Winning score	Margin of victory	Runner(s)-up
1	Mar 18, 1979	Doral-Eastern Open	−9 (67-71-69-72=279)	1 stroke	(United States) Bill Rogers
2	Jul 3, 1983	Western Open	−4 (74-71-68-71=284)	1 stroke	(United States) Tom Watson
3	Oct 30, 1983	Pensacola Open	−18 (68-68-65-65=266)	4 strokes	(United States) Lon Hinkle, (United States) Mark Lye
4	Feb 24, 1985	Doral-Eastern Open	−4 (70-71-72-71=284)	1 stroke	(United States) Tom Kite
5	Jul 12, 1987	Anheuser-Busch Golf Classic	−17 (65-69-67-66=267)	1 stroke	(United States) Bobby Clampett
6	Mar 27, 1988	The Players Championship	−15 (65-72-67-69=273)	4 strokes	(United States) Mike Reid
7	Jul 3, 1989	Beatrice Western Open	−13 (68-67-71-69=275)	Playoff	(United States) Peter Jacobsen
8	Jul 10, 1994	Anheuser-Busch Golf Classic	−17 (67-69-65-66=267)	3 strokes	(United States) Glen Day
9	Sep 25, 1994	Hardee's Golf Classic	−15 (66-67-65-67=265)	1 stroke	(United States) Kenny Perry
10	Oct 30, 1994	The Tour Championship	−10 (66-71-69-68=274)	Playoff	(United States) Fuzzy Zoeller

PGA Tour playoff record (2–0)

No.	Year	Tournament	Opponent	Result
1	1989	Beatrice Western Open	(United States) Peter Jacobsen	Won with par on first extra hole
2	1994	The Tour Championship	(United States) Fuzzy Zoeller	Won with birdie on first extra hole

=== Other wins (1) ===
No.	Date	Tournament	Winning score	Margin of victory	Runners-up
1	Dec 11, 1988	World Cup (with (United States) Ben Crenshaw)	−16 (139-137-137-147=560)	1 stroke	Japan − Masashi Ozaki and Tateo Ozaki

== Results in major championships ==
Tournament	1979	1980	1981	1982	1983	1984	1985	1986	1987	1988	1989
Masters Tournament	CUT					T35	T18	T11	T12	24	T43
U.S. Open			CUT	CUT		T16		T8	T51	T32	T2
The Open Championship						8	CUT			T47	T46
PGA Championship	T28		T56	CUT	CUT	T48	WD	T53	T5	CUT	65

Tournament	1990	1991	1992	1993	1994	1995	1996
Masters Tournament	T36	T17	T37	CUT		T35	CUT
U.S. Open	T47	CUT	T13	T46		T13	CUT
The Open Championship	T31					CUT	T2
PGA Championship	T49	T52	CUT	T31	T19	CUT	CUT

Top 10
Did not play

CUT = missed the half-way cut
WD = withdrew
"T" indicates a tie for a place

=== Summary ===
Tournament	Wins	2nd	3rd	Top-5	Top-10	Top-25	Events	Cuts made
Masters Tournament	0	0	0	0	0	5	13	10
U.S. Open	0	1	0	1	2	5	13	9
The Open Championship	0	1	0	1	2	2	7	5
PGA Championship	0	0	0	1	1	2	17	10
Totals	0	2	0	3	5	14	50	34

- Most consecutive cuts made – 9 (twice)
- Longest streak of top-10s – 1 (five times)

== The Players Championship ==
=== Wins (1) ===
Year	Championship	54 holes	Winning score	Margin	Runner-up
1988	The Players Championship	2 shot lead	−15 (65-72-67-69=273)	4 strokes	(United States) Mike Reid

=== Results timeline ===
Tournament	1979	1980	1981	1982	1983	1984	1985	1986	1987	1988	1989	1990	1991	1992	1993	1994	1995	1996	1997	1998
The Players Championship	T35	CUT	T45	CUT	T49	DQ	CUT	CUT	T12	1	T6	T9	T13	T40	T20	T62	T23	77	CUT	CUT

Win
Top 10

CUT = missed the halfway cut
DQ = disqualified
"T" indicates a tie for a place.

== U.S. national team appearances ==
Professional

- Dunhill Cup: 1988
- World Cup: 1988 (winners), 1989
- Ryder Cup: 1989 (tied)

== See also ==
- Spring 1978 PGA Tour Qualifying School graduates
