= 1989 U.S. Open (golf) =

Tournament information
- Dates: June 15–18, 1989
- Location: Pittsford, New York; 43.11299724592302°N 77.53272691738464°W
- Courses: Oak Hill Country Club, East Course
- Tour: PGA Tour

Statistics
- Par: 70
- Length: 6,902 yards (6,311 m)
- Field: 156 players, 71 after cut
- Cut: 145 (+5)
- Prize fund: $1,049,089
- Winner's share: $200,000

Champion
- (United States) Curtis Strange
- 278 (−2)

Location map
- Location in the United States Location in New York

The 1989 U.S. Open was the 89th U.S. Open, held June 15–18 at the East Course of Oak Hill Country Club in the Town of Pittsford near Rochester, New York. Curtis Strange won his second consecutive U.S. Open, one stroke ahead of runners-up Chip Beck, Mark McCumber, and Ian Woosnam, becoming the first successful defender of a U.S. Open title since Ben Hogan in 1951. Strange became the sixth player to defend the U.S. Open title. This was the last of his 17 wins on the PGA Tour.

Heavy rains before the tournament allowed for some low scores in the early rounds, with a record 38 under-par rounds in the first two rounds. During the second round, four players (Jerry Pate, Nick Price, Doug Weaver, and Mark Wiebe) recorded holes-in-one at the downhill 167-yard (153 m) 6th hole, the most hole-in-ones in U.S. Open history. All four hit a 7-iron past the flag, taking advantage of the damp conditions. The rest of the field had thirty birdies at the hole during the second round.

Gary Player, the 1965 champion and winner of nine major titles, played in his final U.S. Open in 1989. He shot 78-69=147 and missed the cut by two strokes.

This was the third U.S. Open and the fourth major at the East Course. Previous U.S. Opens were in 1956 (Cary Middlecoff) and 1968 (Lee Trevino), and the PGA Championship in 1980 (Jack Nicklaus). It later hosted the Ryder Cup in 1995 and the PGA Championship in 2003 and 2013.

== Course layout ==
East Course

Hole	1	2	3	4	5	6	7	8	9	Out	10	11	12	13	14	15	16	17	18	In	Total
Yards	440	401	211	570	406	167	431	430	419	3,475	429	192	372	594	323	177	442	458	440	3,427	6,902
Par	4	4	3	5	4	3	4	4	4	35	4	3	4	5	4	3	4	4	4	35	70

Previous course lengths for major championships

- 6,964 yards (6,368 m) - par 70, 1980 PGA Championship
- 6,962 yards (6,366 m) - par 70, 1968 U.S. Open
- 6,902 yards (6,311 m) - par 70, 1956 U.S. Open

== Round summaries ==
=== First round ===
Thursday, June 15, 1989

Place	Player	Score	To par
T1	(United States) Jay Don Blake	66	−4
T1	(West Germany) Bernhard Langer	66	−4
T1	(United States) Payne Stewart	66	−4
T4	(United States) Tom Kite	67	−3
T4	(United States) Jack Nicklaus	67	−3
T4	(United States) Tom Pernice Jr.	67	−3
T4	(United States) Scott Simpson	67	−3
T4	(United States) Joey Sindelar	67	−3
T9	(United States) Kurt Beck	68	−2
T9	(England) Nick Faldo	68	−2
T9	(United States) Raymond Floyd	68	−2
T9	(United States) Larry Nelson	68	−2
T9	(United States) Dillard Pruitt	68	−2

=== Second round ===
Friday, June 16, 1989

Strange fired a six-under 64 in the second round to tie the course record, set in 1942 by Hogan, and take the 36-hole lead.

Place	Player	Score	To par
1	(United States) Curtis Strange	71-64=135	−5
2	(United States) Tom Kite	67-69=136	−4
T3	(United States) Jay Don Blake	66-71=137	−3
T3	(United States) Scott Simpson	67-70=137	−3
T5	(United States) Mark McCumber	70-68=138	−2
T5	(Wales) Ian Woosnam	70-68=138	−2
T7	(Japan) Isao Aoki	70-70=140	E
T7	(United States) Chip Beck	71-69=140	E
T7	(Australia) Steve Elkington	70-70=140	E
T7	(England) Nick Faldo	68-72=140	E
T7	(United States) Dan Forsman	70-70=140	E
T7	(United States) Eddie Kirby	70-70=140	E
T7	(United States) Mark Lye	71-69=140	E
T7	(Australia) Greg Norman	72-68=140	E
T7	(United States) Scott Taylor	69-71=140	E
T7	(United States) Mark Wiebe	69-71=140	E
T7	(Canada) Richard Zokol	71-69=140	E

Amateurs: Sigel (+13), Yarian (+38).

=== Third round ===
Saturday, June 17, 1989

Overnight rains thoroughly soaked the already saturated course and caused a delay in the start. Instead of pairs, the players went off on split tees in groupings of three, a first at the U.S. Open. A 73 (+3) in the third round dropped Strange to three back of Tom Kite, whose first three rounds were in the 60s.

Place	Player	Score	To par
1	(United States) Tom Kite	67-69-69=205	−5
2	(United States) Scott Simpson	67-70-69=206	−4
3	(United States) Curtis Strange	71-64-73=208	−2
T4	(United States) Jay Don Blake	66-71-72=209	−1
T4	(United States) Larry Nelson	68-73-68=209	−1
T4	(Japan) Masashi Ozaki	70-71-68=209	−1
T7	(United States) Mark McCumber	70-68-72=210	E
T7	(United States) Tom Pernice Jr.	67-75-68=210	E
T9	(United States) Chip Beck	71-69-71=211	+1
T9	(United States) Brian Claar	71-72-68=211	+1
T9	(Wales) Ian Woosnam	70-68-73=211	+1
T9	(Spain) José María Olazábal	69-72-70=211	+1

=== Final round ===
Sunday, June 18, 1989

Kite led by three after four holes in the final round, but a triple bogey at the 5th hole and bogeys at 8 and 10 dropped him a stroke back of Strange. Double bogeys at 13 and 15 dropped him from contention. Kite recorded a 78 (+8) and finished in ninth place. Strange played steadily in the penultimate pairing, with fifteen consecutive pars until a birdie at the 16th, his first since the second round. Despite a three-putt for bogey at the 18th, Strange held on for a one-stroke win and a second straight U.S. Open title.

Place	Player	Score	To par	Money ($)
1	(United States) Curtis Strange	71-64-73-70=278	−2	200,000
T2	(United States) Chip Beck	71-69-71-68=279	−1	67,823
T2	(United States) Mark McCumber	70-68-72-69=279	−1	67,823
T2	(Wales) Ian Woosnam	70-68-73-68=279	−1	67,823
5	(United States) Brian Claar	71-72-68-69=280	E	34,345
T6	(Japan) Masashi Ozaki	70-71-68-72=281	+1	28,220
T6	(United States) Scott Simpson	67-70-69-75=281	+1	28,220
8	(United States) Peter Jacobsen	71-70-71-70=282	+2	24,307
T9	(United States) Paul Azinger	71-72-70-70=283	+3	19,968
T9	(United States) Hubert Green	69-72-74-68=283	+3	19,968
T9	(United States) Tom Kite	67-69-69-78=283	+3	19,968
T9	(Spain) José María Olazábal	69-72-70-72=283	+3	19,968

==== Scorecard ====
Final round

Hole	1	2	3	4	5	6	7	8	9	10	11	12	13	14	15	16	17	18
Par	4	4	3	5	4	3	4	4	4	4	3	4	5	4	3	4	4	4
(United States) Strange	−2	−2	−2	−2	−2	−2	−2	−2	−2	−2	−2	−2	−2	−2	−2	−3	−3	−2
(United States) Beck	+1	E	+1	+1	+2	+2	+2	+1	+1	+1	E	−1	−1	−1	−1	−1	−1	−1
(United States) McCumber	E	E	E	−1	−1	−1	−1	−2	−1	−1	−1	−1	E	E	E	−1	−1	−1
(Wales) Woosnam	E	−1	−1	−1	−1	−1	−1	−1	+1	E	E	E	E	+1	E	E	E	−1
(United States) Kite	−5	−5	−6	−6	−3	−3	−3	−2	−2	−1	−1	−1	+1	+1	+3	+3	+3	+3

Cumulative tournament scores, relative to par

Birdie	Bogey	Double bogey	Triple bogey+
