= 1988 U.S. Open (golf) =

Coordinates: 42.315°N 71.148°W

Tournament information
- Dates: June 16–20, 1988
- Location: Brookline, Massachusetts
- Course(s): The Country Club; Composite Course
- Tour: PGA Tour

Statistics
- Par: 71
- Length: 7,010 yards (6,410 m)
- Field: 156 players, 65 after cut
- Cut: 146 (+4)
- Prize fund: US$1.0 million
- Winner's share: $180,000

Champion
- (United States) Curtis Strange
- 278 (−6), playoff

Location in the United States
Location in Massachusetts

The 1988 U.S. Open was the 88th U.S. Open, held June 16–20 at The Country Club in Brookline, Massachusetts, a suburb southwest of Boston. Curtis Strange defeated Nick Faldo in an 18-hole playoff for the first of two consecutive U.S. Open titles.

== Final round ==
Strange took the 54-hole lead after a third-round 69, while Faldo was a stroke behind after a 68. Strange and Faldo battled back-and-forth during the final round. Strange three-putted from 15 feet (4.6 m) on the 17th green to fall into a tie, then saved par from a greenside bunker on the 18th to force a Monday playoff.

== Playoff ==
In the playoff, Strange carried a one-stroke lead to the turn after birdies at the 4th and 7th holes. When Faldo bogeyed the 11th, the lead went to two, but Strange bogeyed the next hole to return it to one. Strange rebounded with a birdie on 13 and took a commanding three-shot lead when Faldo bogeyed. Faldo bogeyed three of his last four holes to card a 75, while Strange finished with an even-par 71 and a four-stroke victory.

This was the third U.S. Open at The Country Club and all ended in playoffs. Julius Boros, age 43, defeated Arnold Palmer and Jacky Cupit in 1963, and 20-year-old amateur Francis Ouimet prevailed over Britons Harry Vardon and Ted Ray in 1913.

Strange successfully defended his title in 1989, the first to win consecutive U.S. Opens since Ben Hogan in 1950 and 1951. Brooks Koepka became the first player since Strange to defend his title by winning the U.S. Open in 2017 at Erin Hills and again in 2018 at Shinnecock Hills.

== Course ==
Composite Course

Hole	Name	Yards	Par	Hole	Name	Yards	Par
1	Polo Field	452	4	10	Stockton	439	4
2	Cottage	185	3	11	Primrose 1&2	453	4
3	Pond	448	4	12	Primrose 8	450	4
4	Hospital	338	4	13	Primrose 9	433	4
5	Newton	439	4	14	Quarry	527	5
6	Bakers	312	4	15	Liverpool	434	4
7	Plateau	201	3	16	Clyde	185	3
8	Corner	385	4	17	Elbow	381	4
9	Himalayas	510	5	18	Home	438	4
Out		3,270	35	In		3,740	36
				Total		7,010	71

== Round summaries ==
=== First round ===
Thursday, June 16, 1988

Place	Player	Score	To par
T1	(United States) Bob Gilder	68	−3
T1	(Scotland) Sandy Lyle	68	−3
T1	(United States) Mike Nicolette	68	−3
T4	(United States) Paul Azinger	69	−2
T4	(Spain) Seve Ballesteros	69	−2
T4	(United States) Dick Mast	69	−2
T4	(United States) Larry Mize	69	−2
T4	(United States) Scott Simpson	69	−2
T9	(United States) Craig Stadler	70	−1
T9	(United States) Curtis Strange	70	−1
T9	(United States) Lanny Wadkins	70	−1

=== Second round ===
Friday, June 17, 1988

Defending champion Scott Simpson shot 66 (−5) to lead after 36 holes.

Place	Player	Score	To par
1	(United States) Scott Simpson	69-66=135	−7
2	(United States) Larry Mize	69-67=136	−6
T3	(United States) Bob Gilder	68-69=137	−5
T3	(United States) Curtis Strange	70-67=137	−5
T5	(United States) Paul Azinger	69-70=139	−3
T5	(United States) Fred Couples	72-67=139	−3
T5	(England) Nick Faldo	72-67=139	−3
T5	(Scotland) Sandy Lyle	68-71=139	−3
T9	(United States) Jay Haas	73-67=140	−2
T9	(United States) D. A. Weibring	71-69=140	−2

Amateurs: Mayfair (+1), Tolles (+14), Duncan (+15), Rintoul (+16)

=== Third round ===
Saturday, June 18, 1988

Place	Player	Score	To par
1	(United States) Curtis Strange	70-67-69=206	−7
T2	(England) Nick Faldo	72-67-68=207	−6
T2	(United States) Bob Gilder	68-69-70=207	−6
T2	(United States) Scott Simpson	69-66-72=207	−6
T5	(United States) Larry Mize	69-67-72=208	−5
T5	(United States) D. A. Weibring	71-69-68=208	−5
7	(United States) Mark O'Meara	71-72-66=209	−4
8	(United States) Fred Couples	72-67-71=210	−3
9	(United States) Lanny Wadkins	70-71-70=211	−2
10	(United States) Ken Green	72-70-70=212	−1

=== Final round ===
Sunday, June 19, 1988

Champion
Silver Cup winner (leading amateur)
(a) = amateur
(c) = past champion

Top 10
Place	Player	Score	To par	Money (US$)
T1	(United States) Curtis Strange	70-67-69-72=278	−6	Playoff
T1	(England) Nick Faldo	72-67-68-71=278	−6	Playoff
T3	(United States) Mark O'Meara	71-72-66-71=280	−4	41,370
T3	(United States) Steve Pate	72-69-72-67=280	−4	41,370
T3	(United States) D. A. Weibring	71-69-68-72=280	−4	41,370
T6	(United States) Paul Azinger	69-70-76-66=281	−3	25,414
T6	(United States) Scott Simpson (c)	69-66-72-74=281	−3	25,414
T8	(United States) Bob Gilder	68-69-70-75=282	−2	20,903
T8	(United States) Fuzzy Zoeller (c)	73-72-71-66=282	−2	20,903
T10	(United States) Fred Couples	72-67-71-73=283	−1	17,870
T10	(United States) Payne Stewart	73-73-70-67=283	−1	17,870

Leaderboard below the top 10
Place	Player	Score	To par	Money (US$)
T12	(United States) Andy Bean	71-71-72-70=284	E	14,781
T12	(United States) Ben Crenshaw	71-72-74-67=284	E	14,781
T12	(United States) Larry Mize	69-67-72-76=284	E	14,781
T12	(United States) Dan Pohl	74-72-69-69=284	E	14,781
T12	(United States) Lanny Wadkins	70-71-70-73=284	E	14,781

Amateur: Billy Mayfair (+3)

==== Scorecard ====
Hole	1	2	3	4	5	6	7	8	9	10	11	12	13	14	15	16	17	18
Par	4	3	4	4	4	4	3	4	5	4	4	4	4	5	4	3	4	4
(United States) Strange	−7	−6	−5	−5	−5	−5	−6	−6	−6	−7	−7	−7	−7	−7	−7	−7	−6	−6
(England) Faldo	−6	−6	−6	−6	−6	−6	−6	−6	−6	−6	−6	−6	−6	−6	−7	−6	−6	−6
(United States) O'Meara	−4	−3	−3	−3	−3	−3	−3	−3	−4	−5	−5	−5	−5	−5	−5	−5	−5	−4
(United States) Pate	+1	+1	+1	+1	+1	E	−1	−1	−3	−4	−4	−4	−3	−3	−4	−4	−4	−4
(United States) Weibring	−5	−4	−4	−5	−6	−6	−6	−5	−5	−5	−5	−5	−5	−5	−5	−5	−4	−4
(United States) Azinger	+2	+2	+1	E	+1	E	−1	−2	−3	−3	−3	−3	−3	−3	−3	−4	−3	−3
(United States) S Simpson	−6	−6	−5	−3	−3	−3	−3	−3	−2	−2	−1	−2	−3	−3	−3	−3	−3	−3
(United States) Gilder	−5	−5	−5	−4	−4	−4	−3	−3	−4	−3	−3	−2	−2	−3	−2	−2	−1	−2
(United States) Zoeller	+3	+3	+3	+2	+1	+1	+1	+1	+1	+2	+1	+1	E	−1	−1	−1	−2	−2
(United States) Couples	−3	−3	−3	−3	−3	−3	−3	−3	−4	−3	−1	−1	−1	−1	−1	−1	−1	−1
(United States) Stewart	+2	+2	+1	+1	+1	E	E	E	E	E	+1	+1	E	−1	E	E	−1	−1

Cumulative tournament scores, relative to par

Eagle	Birdie	Bogey	Double bogey

Cumulative tournament scores, relative to par

=== Playoff ===
Monday, June 20, 1988

Place	Player	Score	To par	Money (US$)
1	(United States) Curtis Strange	34-37=71	E	180,000
2	(England) Nick Faldo	35-40=75	+4	90,000

==== Scorecard ====
Hole	1	2	3	4	5	6	7	8	9	10	11	12	13	14	15	16	17	18
Par	4	3	4	4	4	4	3	4	5	4	4	4	4	5	4	3	4	4
(United States) Strange	E	E	E	+1	E	E	−1	−1	−1	−1	−1	E	−1	−1	E	E	E	E
(England) Faldo	E	E	+1	+1	+1	+1	E	E	E	E	+1	+1	+2	+1	+2	+2	+3	+4

Cumulative playoff scores, relative to par

Birdie	Bogey
