= Joey Sindelar =

American professional golfer (born 1958)

Personal information
- Full name: Joseph Paul Sindelar
- Nationality: United States
- Born: March 30, 1958 (age 68) Fort Knox, Kentucky, U.S.
- Height: 5 ft 10 in (1.78 m)
- Weight: 220 lb (100 kg; 16 st)
- Children: 2

Career
- Sport: Golf
- College: Ohio State University
- Turned professional: 1981
- Current tour: PGA Tour Champions
- Former tour: PGA Tour
- Professional wins: 9
- Highest ranking: 18 (August 21, 1988)

Number of wins by tour
- PGA Tour: 7

Best results in major championships
- Masters Tournament: T27: 1993
- PGA Championship: T10: 1997
- U.S. Open: T6: 1992
- The Open Championship: CUT: 1986

Joseph Paul Sindelar (born March 30, 1958) is an American professional golfer who currently plays on the PGA Tour Champions. He previously played on the PGA Tour, winning seven tournaments between 1985 and 2004.

== Early life ==
Sindelar was born in Fort Knox, Kentucky, while his father served in the Army, but he lived in Horseheads, New York, for most of his life. He was a childhood friend and high school golf rival of fellow PGA Tour player Mike Hulbert.

== Amateur career ==
Sindelar attended Ohio State University in Columbus, Ohio, where he was a distinguished member of the school's golf team. He was a three-time All-American, a member of the 1979 NCAA Championship team, and Ohio State's Athlete of the Year in 1981. Sindelar was inducted into the Ohio State Varsity O Hall of Fame in 1992.

== Professional career ==
Sindelar turned pro in 1981. He won seven PGA Tour events and was one of the most consistent players on the tour, with more than 80 top-10 finishes in his career. Sindelar had ten top-10 finishes in 1988, including victories at The Honda Classic and The International. He played on the 1991 World Cup team. His best finish in a major was T6 at the 1992 U.S. Open. Sindelar scored a double eagle at the 2006 PGA Championship, which was only the third time such a score had been recorded in that competition's history.

Since turning 50 years old in 2008, he has played on the PGA Tour Champions. Sindelar has over 30 top-10 finishes on the senior tour, including four second-place finishes with a playoff loss at the 2010 Liberty Mutual Legends of Golf.

== Personal life ==
Sindelar currently resides in Lansing, New York.

== Amateur wins ==
- 1971 New York State Boys
- 1980 New York State Amateur

== Professional wins (9) ==
=== PGA Tour wins (7) ===
No.	Date	Tournament	Winning score	Margin of victory	Runner(s)-up
1	Apr 7, 1985	Greater Greensboro Open	−3 (68-76-72-69=285)	1 stroke	(Japan) Isao Aoki, (United States) Craig Stadler
2	Sep 1, 1985	B.C. Open	−10 (66-71-69-68=274)	1 stroke	(United States) Mike Reid
3	Sep 6, 1987	B.C. Open (2)	−18 (65-63-69-69=266)	4 strokes	(United States) Jeff Sluman
4	Mar 13, 1988	The Honda Classic	−12 (68-70-68-70=276)	2 strokes	(United States) Ed Fiori, (Scotland) Sandy Lyle, (United States) Payne Stewart
5	Aug 21, 1988	The International	17 pts (3-11-7-17=17)	4 points	(United States) Steve Pate, (United States) Dan Pohl
6	Sep 9, 1990	Hardee's Golf Classic	−12 (70-65-67-66=268)	Playoff	(United States) Willie Wood
7	May 9, 2004	Wachovia Championship	−11 (69-69-70-69=277)	Playoff	(United States) Arron Oberholser

PGA Tour playoff record (2–1)

No.	Year	Tournament	Opponent(s)	Result
1	1988	Canon Sammy Davis Jr.-Greater Hartford Open	(Canada) Dave Barr, (United States) Mark Brooks	Brooks won with birdie on second extra hole Sindelar eliminated by par on first hole
2	1990	Hardee's Golf Classic	(United States) Willie Wood	Won with par on first extra hole
3	2004	Wachovia Championship	(United States) Arron Oberholser	Won with par on second extra hole

=== Other wins (2) ===
- 1983 New York State Open (as an amateur)
- 1989 Fred Meyer Challenge (with Craig Stadler)

== Playoff record ==
PGA Tour Champions playoff record (0–1)

No.	Year	Tournament	Opponents	Result
1	2010	Liberty Mutual Legends of Golf (with (United States) John Cook)	(United States) Mark O'Meara and (Zimbabwe) Nick Price	Lost to par on second extra hole

== Results in major championships ==
Tournament	1980	1981	1982	1983	1984	1985	1986	1987	1988	1989
Masters Tournament						T31	CUT	T35	T39	CUT
U.S. Open	CUT	CUT	CUT			T15	T15	T51	T17	T33
The Open Championship							CUT			
PGA Championship					T62	T28	T53	CUT	CUT	CUT

Tournament	1990	1991	1992	1993	1994	1995	1996	1997	1998	1999
Masters Tournament		T46		T27						
U.S. Open			T6	CUT					T43	CUT
The Open Championship										
PGA Championship		T63	T56	WD			T14	T10	T40	WD

Tournament	2000	2001	2002	2003	2004	2005	2006	2007
Masters Tournament								
U.S. Open			CUT	CUT	CUT		CUT	CUT
The Open Championship								
PGA Championship			T64		CUT		T49	

Top 10
Did not play

CUT = missed the half-way cut
WD = withdrew
"T" = tied

=== Summary ===
Tournament	Wins	2nd	3rd	Top-5	Top-10	Top-25	Events	Cuts made
Masters Tournament	0	0	0	0	0	0	7	5
U.S. Open	0	0	0	0	1	4	17	7
The Open Championship	0	0	0	0	0	0	1	0
PGA Championship	0	0	0	0	1	2	16	10
Totals	0	0	0	0	2	6	41	22

- Most consecutive cuts made – 5 (1991 Masters – 1993 Masters)
- Longest streak of top-10s – 1 (twice)

== Results in The Players Championship ==
Tournament	1984	1985	1986	1987	1988	1989
The Players Championship	CUT	T27	T17	T63	T16	T34

Tournament	1990	1991	1992	1993	1994	1995	1996	1997	1998	1999
The Players Championship	T46	T41	T46	T16	T35		CUT	T31	T61	T10

Tournament	2000	2001	2002	2003	2004	2005	2006	2007
The Players Championship	CUT		CUT	CUT	T74	T17	T58	T68

Top 10
Did not play

CUT = missed the halfway cut
"T" indicates a tie for a place

== Results in World Golf Championships ==
Tournament	2004
Match Play	
Championship	
Invitational	T32

Did not play

"T" = Tied

== U.S. national team appearances ==
Professional

- Kirin Cup: 1988 (winners)
- World Cup: 1991

== See also ==
- 1983 PGA Tour Qualifying School graduates
- List of golfers with most PGA Tour wins
