= 1998 Masters Tournament =

American golf tournament held in 1998

- Front cover of the 1998 Masters Journal

Tournament information
- Dates: April 9–12, 1998
- Location: Augusta, Georgia; 33.503°N 82.020°W
- Course: Augusta National Golf Club
- Organized by: Augusta National Golf Club
- Tours: PGA Tour; European Tour; Japan Golf Tour

Statistics
- Par: 72
- Length: 6,925 yards (6,332 m)
- Field: 88 players, 46 after cut
- Cut: 150 (+6)
- Prize fund: US$3.2 million
- Winner's share: $576,000

Champion
- (United States) Mark O'Meara
- 279 (−9)

Location map
- Location in the United States Location in Georgia

The 1998 Masters Tournament was the 62nd Masters Tournament, held from April 9–12 at Augusta National Golf Club. Mark O'Meara won his first major championship with a 20-foot (6 m) birdie putt on the final hole to win by one stroke over runners-up David Duval and Fred Couples. He birdied three of the final four holes in a final round 67 (−5).

In one of the most remarkable performances of his career, Jack Nicklaus tied for sixth place at the age of 58. His final round 68 (−4) yielded a 283 (−5), the lowest 72-hole score by a player over age 50 at the Masters until Phil Mickelson shot a score of 280 (−8) in the 2023 tournament. Nicklaus was in contention for the title until well into the back nine holes in the final round. It was his last serious run for a major championship, twelve years after his sixth Masters victory in 1986.

In his first Masters, David Toms shot a 29 (−7) on the back nine on Sunday, en route to a 64 (−8). He had six consecutive birdies on holes 12–17.

O'Meara's win came in his 15th attempt at Augusta, setting a record for appearances before a victory. He had previously been considered one of the best players to never win a major. Later in July, he won the Open Championship and earned PGA Tour Player of the Year honors for 1998.

Matt Kuchar, a 19-year-old sophomore at Georgia Tech, was the low amateur at even-par 288 and tied for 21st place. The reigning U.S. Amateur champion, he carded a four-under 68 in the third round.

== Field ==
1. Masters champions

Tommy Aaron, Seve Ballesteros, Gay Brewer, Billy Casper, Charles Coody, Fred Couples (9,12), Ben Crenshaw, Nick Faldo, Raymond Floyd, Doug Ford, Bernhard Langer (9), Sandy Lyle, Larry Mize, Jack Nicklaus, José María Olazábal (9,10), Arnold Palmer, Gary Player, Craig Stadler, Tom Watson (9), Tiger Woods (9,12,13), Ian Woosnam, Fuzzy Zoeller

- George Archer, Jack Burke Jr., Bob Goalby, Herman Keiser, Cary Middlecoff, Byron Nelson, Gene Sarazen, Sam Snead, and Art Wall Jr. did not play.

2. U.S. Open champions (last five years)

Ernie Els (9,10,12,13), Lee Janzen (11,13), Steve Jones (12,13), Corey Pavin

3. The Open champions (last five years)

John Daly, Tom Lehman (9,10,13), Justin Leonard (9,11,12,13), Greg Norman (12,13), Nick Price (4,9,12,13)

4. PGA champions (last five years)

Paul Azinger, Mark Brooks, Steve Elkington (9,13), Davis Love III (9,10,11,12,13)

5. U.S. Amateur champion and runner-up

Joel Kribel (a), Matt Kuchar (a)

6. The Amateur champion

Craig Watson (a)

7. U.S. Amateur Public Links champion

Tim Clark (a)

8. U.S. Mid-Amateur champion

Ken Bakst (a)

9. Top 24 players and ties from the 1997 Masters

Stuart Appleby (13), Mark Calcavecchia (12,13), Fred Funk, John Huston (12), Per-Ulrik Johansson, Tom Kite (11), Jesper Parnevik (12,13), Costantino Rocca, Vijay Singh (12,13), Jeff Sluman, Paul Stankowski (13), Tommy Tolles (10,13), Lee Westwood, Willie Wood

10. Top 16 players and ties from the 1997 U.S. Open

Billy Andrade, Olin Browne, Stewart Cink (12,13), Jim Furyk (11,13), Jay Haas, Scott Hoch (11,12,13), Bradley Hughes, Jeff Maggert (11,13), Scott McCarron (12,13), Colin Montgomerie, David Ogrin, Bob Tway

- Loren Roberts (12,13) was unable to compete due to a rib injury.

11. Top eight players and ties from 1997 PGA Championship

Phil Blackmar (12)

12. Winners of PGA Tour events since the previous Masters

Michael Bradley, Billy Ray Brown, David Duval (13), David Frost, Bill Glasson (13), Tim Herron, Gabriel Hjertstedt, Billy Mayfair, Phil Mickelson (13), Frank Nobilo (13), Scott Simpson, David Toms

13. Top 30 players from the 1997 PGA Tour money list

John Cook, Brad Faxon, Andrew Magee, Mark O'Meara

14. Special foreign invitation

Darren Clarke, Ignacio Garrido, Retief Goosen, Shigeki Maruyama, Masashi Ozaki

== Round summaries ==
=== First round ===
Thursday, April 9, 1998
Friday, April 10, 1998

Place	Player	Score	To par
1	(United States) Fred Couples	69	−3
T2	(United States) Scott Hoch	70	−2
T2	(Spain) José María Olazábal	70	−2
T2	(United States) Paul Stankowski	70	−2
T5	(United States) Paul Azinger	71	−1
T5	(United States) Phil Blackmar	71	−1
T5	(United States) David Duval	71	−1
T5	(Scotland) Colin Montgomerie	71	−1
T5	(United States) Tiger Woods	71	−1
T5	(United States) Fuzzy Zoeller	71	−1

First round suspended by darkness; start was delayed by 90 minutes to get course playable after heavy rains Wednesday night.

=== Second round ===
Friday, April 10, 1998

Place	Player	Score	To par
T1	(United States) Fred Couples	69-70=139	−5
T1	(United States) David Duval	71-68=139	−5
3	(United States) Scott Hoch	70-71=141	−3
T4	(United States) Paul Azinger	71-72=143	−1
T4	(United States) Jay Haas	72-71=143	−1
T4	(United States) Phil Mickelson	74-69=143	−1
T4	(Spain) José María Olazábal	70-73=143	−1
T4	(United States) Tiger Woods	71-72=143	−1
T9	(United States) Scott McCarron	73-71=144	E
T9	(United States) Mark O'Meara	74-70=144	E

Amateurs: Kuchar (+4), Kribel (+6), Watson (+13), Clark (+14), Bakst (+16).

=== Third round ===
Saturday, April 11, 1998

Place	Player	Score	To par
1	(United States) Fred Couples	69-70-71=210	−6
T2	(United States) Paul Azinger	71-72-69=212	−4
T2	(United States) Phil Mickelson	74-69-69=212	−4
T2	(United States) Mark O'Meara	74-70-68=212	−4
T5	(United States) David Duval	71-68-74=213	−3
T5	(United States) Jim Furyk	76-70-67=213	−3
T7	(United States) Jay Haas	72-71-71=214	−2
T7	(United States) Scott Hoch	70-71-73=214	−2
T7	(Spain) José María Olazábal	70-73-71=214	−2
T10	(South Africa) Ernie Els	75-70-70=215	−1
T10	(Scotland) Colin Montgomerie	71-75-69=215	−1
T10	(United States) Jack Nicklaus	73-72-70=215	−1
T10	(United States) Tiger Woods	71-72-72=215	−1

=== Final round ===
Sunday, April 12, 1998

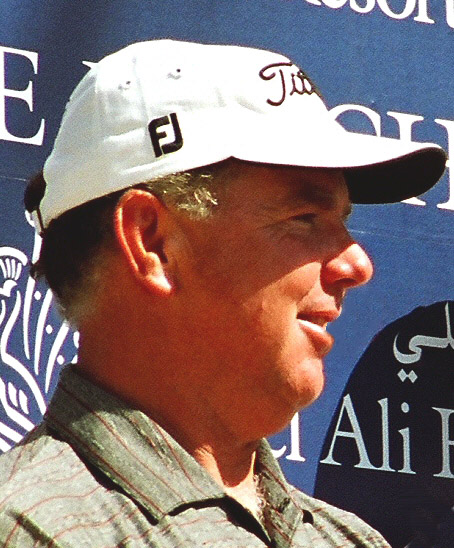
Mark O'Meara won his first Masters title

External videos
- Full final round coverage on CBS on YouTube

==== Final leaderboard ====
Champion
Silver Cup winner (low amateur)
(a) = amateur
(c) = past champion

Top 10
Place	Player	Score	To par	Money (US$)
1	(United States) Mark O'Meara	74-70-68-67=279	−9	576,000
T2	(United States) Fred Couples (c)	69-70-71-70=280	−8	281,600
T2	(United States) David Duval	71-68-74-67=280	−8	281,600
4	(United States) Jim Furyk	76-70-67-68=281	−7	153,600
5	(United States) Paul Azinger	71-72-69-70=282	−6	128,000
T6	(United States) Jack Nicklaus (c)	73-72-70-68=283	−5	111,200
T6	(United States) David Toms	75-72-72-64=283	−5	111,200
T8	(Northern Ireland) Darren Clarke	76-73-67-69=285	−3	89,600
T8	(United States) Justin Leonard	74-73-69-69=285	−3	89,600
T8	(Scotland) Colin Montgomerie	71-75-69-70=285	−3	89,600
T8	(United States) Tiger Woods (c)	71-72-72-70=285	−3	89,600

Leaderboard below the top 10
Place	Player	Score	To par	Money ($)
T12	(United States) Jay Haas	72-71-71-72=286	−2	64,800
T12	(Sweden) Per-Ulrik Johansson	74-75-67-70=286	−2	64,800
T12	(United States) Phil Mickelson	74-69-69-74=286	−2	64,800
T12	(Spain) José María Olazábal (c)	70-73-71-72=286	−2	64,800
T16	(United States) Mark Calcavecchia	74-74-69-70=287	−1	48,000
T16	(South Africa) Ernie Els	75-70-70-72=287	−1	48,000
T16	(United States) Scott Hoch	70-71-73-73=287	−1	48,000
T16	(United States) Scott McCarron	73-71-72-71=287	−1	48,000
T16	(Wales) Ian Woosnam (c)	74-71-72-70=287	−1	48,000
T21	(United States) Matt Kuchar (a)	72-76-68-72=288	E	0
T21	(United States) Willie Wood	74-74-70-70=288	E	38,400
T23	(United States) Stewart Cink	74-76-69-70=289	+1	33,280
T23	(United States) John Huston	77-71-70-71=289	+1	33,280
T23	(United States) Jeff Maggert	72-73-72-72=289	+1	33,280
T26	(United States) Brad Faxon	73-74-71-72=290	+2	26,133
T26	(South Africa) David Frost	72-73-74-71=290	+2	26,133
T26	(United States) Steve Jones	75-70-75-70=290	+2	26,133
29	(United States) Michael Bradley	73-74-72-72=291	+3	23,680
30	(Australia) Steve Elkington	75-75-71-71=292	+4	22,720
T31	(United States) Andrew Magee	74-72-74-73=293	+5	21,280
T31	(Sweden) Jesper Parnevik	75-73-73-72=293	+5	21,280
T33	(United States) Phil Blackmar	71-78-75-70=294	+6	18,112
T33	(United States) John Daly	77-71-71-75=294	+6	18,112
T33	(United States) Lee Janzen	76-74-72-72=294	+6	18,112
T33	(United States) Davis Love III	74-75-67-78=294	+6	18,112
T33	(United States) Fuzzy Zoeller (c)	71-74-75-74=294	+6	18,112
38	(United States) Tom Kite	73-74-74-74=295	+7	15,680
T39	(Germany) Bernhard Langer (c)	75-73-74-74=296	+8	14,720
T39	(United States) Paul Stankowski	70-80-72-74=296	+8	14,720
T41	(United States) Corey Pavin	73-77-72-75=297	+9	13,440
T41	(United States) Craig Stadler (c)	79-68-73-77=297	+9	13,440
43	(United States) John Cook	75-73-74-76=298	+10	12,480
44	(England) Lee Westwood	74-76-72-78=300	+12	11,840
45	(United States) Joel Kribel (a)	74-76-76-75=301	+13	0
46	(South Africa) Gary Player (c)	77-72-78-75=302	+14	11,200
CUT	(United States) Billy Ray Brown	76-75=151	+7	
CUT	(England) Nick Faldo (c)	72-79=151	+7	
CUT	(United States) Raymond Floyd (c)	74-77=151	+7	
CUT	(South Africa) Retief Goosen	74-77=151	+7	
CUT	(United States) Tim Herron	76-75=151	+7	
CUT	(Scotland) Sandy Lyle (c)	74-77=151	+7	
CUT	(United States) Billy Mayfair	76-75=151	+7	
CUT	(Zimbabwe) Nick Price	75-76=151	+7	
CUT	(United States) Tommy Tolles	75-76=151	+7	
CUT	(United States) Tom Watson (c)	78-73=151	+7	
CUT	(United States) Olin Browne	72-80=152	+8	
CUT	(United States) Larry Mize (c)	73-79=152	+8	
CUT	(Japan) Masashi Ozaki	75-77=152	+8	
CUT	(United States) Bob Tway	74-78=152	+8	
CUT	(United States) Billy Andrade	75-78=153	+9	
CUT	(Australia) Bradley Hughes	75-78=153	+9	
CUT	(New Zealand) Frank Nobilo	77-76=153	+9	
CUT	(Italy) Costantino Rocca	81-72=153	+9	
CUT	(Australia) Stuart Appleby	77-77=154	+10	
CUT	(Japan) Shigeki Maruyama	74-80=154	+10	
CUT	(Australia) Greg Norman	76-78=154	+10	
CUT	(United States) Jeff Sluman	78-76=154	+10	
CUT	(United States) Ben Crenshaw (c)	83-72=155	+11	
CUT	(United States) David Ogrin	77-78=155	+11	
CUT	(United States) Mark Brooks	80-76=156	+12	
CUT	(United States) Tom Lehman	80-76=156	+12	
CUT	(Fiji) Vijay Singh	76-80=156	+12	
CUT	(Spain) Seve Ballesteros (c)	78-79=157	+13	
CUT	(United States) Fred Funk	79-78=157	+13	
CUT	(Spain) Ignacio Garrido	85-72=157	+13	
CUT	(Sweden) Gabriel Hjertstedt	79-78=157	+13	
CUT	(United States) Scott Simpson	79-78=157	+13	
CUT	(Scotland) Craig Watson (a)	79-78=157	+13	
CUT	(United States) Gay Brewer (c)	72-86=158	+14	
CUT	(South Africa) Tim Clark (a)	80-78=158	+14	
CUT	(United States) Tommy Aaron (c)	81-79=160	+16	
CUT	(United States) Ken Bakst (a)	82-78=160	+16	
CUT	(United States) Bill Glasson	82-79=161	+17	
CUT	(United States) Charles Coody (c)	79-85=164	+20	
CUT	(United States) Arnold Palmer (c)	79-87=166	+22	
CUT	(United States) Billy Casper (c)	81-86=167	+23	
WD	(United States) Doug Ford (c)	86	+14	

==== Scorecard ====
Hole	1	2	3	4	5	6	7	8	9	10	11	12	13	14	15	16	17	18
Par	4	5	4	3	4	3	4	5	4	4	4	3	5	4	5	3	4	4
(United States) O'Meara	−4	−5	−6	−7	−7	−7	−7	−7	−7	−6	−6	−6	−6	−6	−7	−7	−8	−9
(United States) Couples	−5	−6	−6	−7	−7	−7	−8	−9	−8	−8	−8	−8	−6	−6	−8	−8	−8	−8
(United States) Duval	−2	−3	−3	−3	−3	−3	−4	−4	−5	−6	−7	−7	−8	−8	−9	−8	−8	−8
(United States) Furyk	−3	−4	−4	−3	−2	−2	−2	−3	−4	−5	−5	−5	−6	−6	−5	−6	−7	−7
(United States) Azinger	−4	−5	−5	−4	−4	−5	−5	−5	−5	−5	−5	−4	−5	−5	−6	−6	−6	−6
(United States) Nicklaus	−1	−2	−3	−2	−2	−3	−4	−4	−4	−4	−4	−3	−4	−4	−5	−5	−5	−5
(United States) Toms	+3	+2	+2	+3	+3	+3	+2	+2	+2	+1	+1	E	−1	−2	−3	−4	−5	−5
(United States) Mickelson	−4	−5	−5	−5	−5	−5	−4	−4	−4	−4	−4	−2	−2	−1	−2	−3	−1	−2

Cumulative tournament scores, relative to par

Eagle	Birdie	Bogey	Double bogey

== Quotes ==
- "Good-looking putt...Mark O'Meara has won the Masters!" – Jim Nantz's (CBS Sports) call as O'Meara sunk his birdie putt on the 18th hole to defeat Fred Couples and David Duval and win the tournament
