= John Huston (golfer) =

American professional golfer (born 1961)

Personal information
- Full name: Johnny Ray Huston
- Nationality: United States
- Born: June 1, 1961 (age 65) Mt. Vernon, Illinois, U.S.
- Height: 5 ft 10 in (1.78 m)
- Weight: 155 lb (70 kg; 11.1 st)

Career
- Sport: Golf
- College: Auburn University
- Turned professional: 1983
- Current tour: PGA Tour Champions
- Former tour: PGA Tour
- Professional wins: 12
- Highest ranking: 16 (September 26, 1999)

Number of wins by tour
- PGA Tour: 7
- PGA Tour Champions: 1
- Other: 4

Best results in major championships
- Masters Tournament: T3: 1990
- PGA Championship: T7: 1991
- U.S. Open: 4th: 2000
- The Open Championship: T11: 1998

Johnny Ray Huston (born June 1, 1961) is an American professional golfer who won seven PGA Tour events and currently plays on the PGA Tour Champions.

== Career ==
Huston was born in Mt. Vernon, Illinois. He attended Auburn University in Auburn, Alabama and was a member of the golf team.

In 1983, Huston turned professional. He won seven PGA Tour events and has had more than 80 top-10 finishes in his career. Huston has a history of being a "streaky" player who either plays extremely well or mediocre. At the 1998 United Airlines Hawaiian Open, he broke a 53-year-old record for 72-hole scoring by shooting 260, a 28-under-par performance. Huston attributed his record-breaking score to magnets that he placed in his shoes and in the cover of his mattress. He also had a course-record 61 at the 1996 Memorial Tournament. He finished in the top-100 on the money list every year but one during the first 17 years of his career.

Huston was a member of the winning inaugural Presidents Cup team in 1994 and the losing 1998 team. He is the first American golfer selected to two President Cups without a Ryder Cup.

Huston's best finish in a major championship was T-3 at the 1990 Masters Tournament; he also had a solo 4th-place finish at the 2000 U.S. Open. His peak Official World Golf Ranking was 15th in 1999.

Huston's first Champions Tour win was at the 2011 Dick's Sporting Goods Open, which was his third start and came just 25 days after he turned 50.

Huston has a reputation for playing very quickly. Commentator Gary McCord has described Huston as the Tour's fastest golfer, with no one a close second.

== Personal life ==
Huston lives in Palm Harbor, Florida.

== Professional wins (11) ==
=== PGA Tour wins (7) ===
No.	Date	Tournament	Winning score	Margin of victory	Runner(s)-up
1	Mar 11, 1990	Honda Classic	−6 (68-73-70-71=282)	2 strokes	(United States) Mark Calcavecchia
2	Oct 18, 1992	Walt Disney World/Oldsmobile Classic	−26 (66-68-66-62=262)	3 strokes	(United States) Mark O'Meara
3	Mar 6, 1994	Doral-Ryder Open	−14 (70-68-70-66=274)	3 strokes	(United States) Billy Andrade, (United States) Brad Bryant
4	Feb 15, 1998	United Airlines Hawaiian Open	−28 (63-65-66-66=260)	7 strokes	(United States) Tom Watson
5	Oct 25, 1998	National Car Rental Golf Classic Disney (2)	−16 (67-70-69-66=272)	1 stroke	(United States) Davis Love III
6	Oct 22, 2000	Tampa Bay Classic	−13 (66-73-67-65=271)	3 strokes	(United States) Carl Paulson
7	Oct 5, 2003	Southern Farm Bureau Classic	−20 (66-66-68-68=268)	1 stroke	(South Africa) Brenden Pappas

PGA Tour playoff record (0–1)

No.	Year	Tournament	Opponent	Result
1	1993	Shell Houston Open	(United States) Jim McGovern	Lost to birdie on second extra hole

=== Other wins (4) ===
- 1985 Florida Open
- 1987 PGA Tour Qualifying Tournament
- 1988 JCPenney Classic (with Amy Benz)
- 2005 Franklin Templeton Shootout (with Kenny Perry)

=== PGA Tour Champions wins (1) ===
No.	Date	Tournament	Winning score	Margin of victory	Runner-up
1	Jun 26, 2011	Dick's Sporting Goods Open	−16 (65-70-65=200)	3 strokes	(Zimbabwe) Nick Price

PGA Tour Champions playoff record (0–1)

No.	Year	Tournament	Opponent	Result
1	2022	Shaw Charity Classic	(United States) Jerry Kelly	Lost to birdie on first extra hole

== Results in major championships ==
Tournament	1989	1990	1991	1992	1993	1994	1995	1996	1997	1998	1999	2000	2001	2002	2003	2004
Masters Tournament		T3	T29	T25	59	T10	T17	17	T21	T23	T36	T14	T20		CUT	
U.S. Open	CUT	T14	CUT		CUT	CUT	CUT	T82		T32	T17	4	CUT	CUT		
The Open Championship		CUT			T48	CUT	T31			T11	T68	CUT	CUT			CUT
PGA Championship	CUT	T57	T7	T18	T44	CUT	DQ	CUT		T13	CUT	71	72	T39	WD	CUT

Top 10
Did not play

CUT = missed the half-way cut
WD = Withdrew
DQ = Disqualified
"T" = tied

=== Summary ===
Tournament	Wins	2nd	3rd	Top-5	Top-10	Top-25	Events	Cuts made
Masters Tournament	0	0	1	1	2	9	13	12
U.S. Open	0	0	0	1	1	3	12	5
The Open Championship	0	0	0	0	0	1	9	4
PGA Championship	0	0	0	0	1	3	15	8
Totals	0	0	1	2	4	16	49	29

- Most consecutive cuts made – 8 (1997 Masters – 1999 Open Championship)
- Longest streak of top-10s – 1 (five times)

== Results in The Players Championship ==
Tournament	1988	1989	1990	1991	1992	1993	1994	1995	1996	1997	1998	1999	2000	2001	2002	2003	2004	2005	2006
The Players Championship	68	CUT		T15	T40	CUT	T35	CUT	CUT	T68	CUT	T20	CUT	CUT	T9	WD	T26	CUT	CUT

Top 10
Did not play

CUT = missed the halfway cut
WD = withdrew
"T" indicates a tie for a place

== Results in World Golf Championships ==
Tournament	1999	2000	2001	2002	2003	2004
Match Play	3	R64	R64		R64	R16
Championship	T34		NT^{1}			
Invitational	T33					

^{1}Cancelled due to 9/11

Top 10
Did not play

QF, R16, R32, R64 = Round in which player lost in match play
"T" = Tied
NT = No tournament

== U.S. national team appearances ==
Professional

- Presidents Cup: 1994 (winners), 1998

== See also ==
- 1987 PGA Tour Qualifying School graduates
- 2008 PGA Tour Qualifying School graduates
- List of golfers with most PGA Tour wins
