= John Cook (golfer) =

American professional golfer (born 1957)

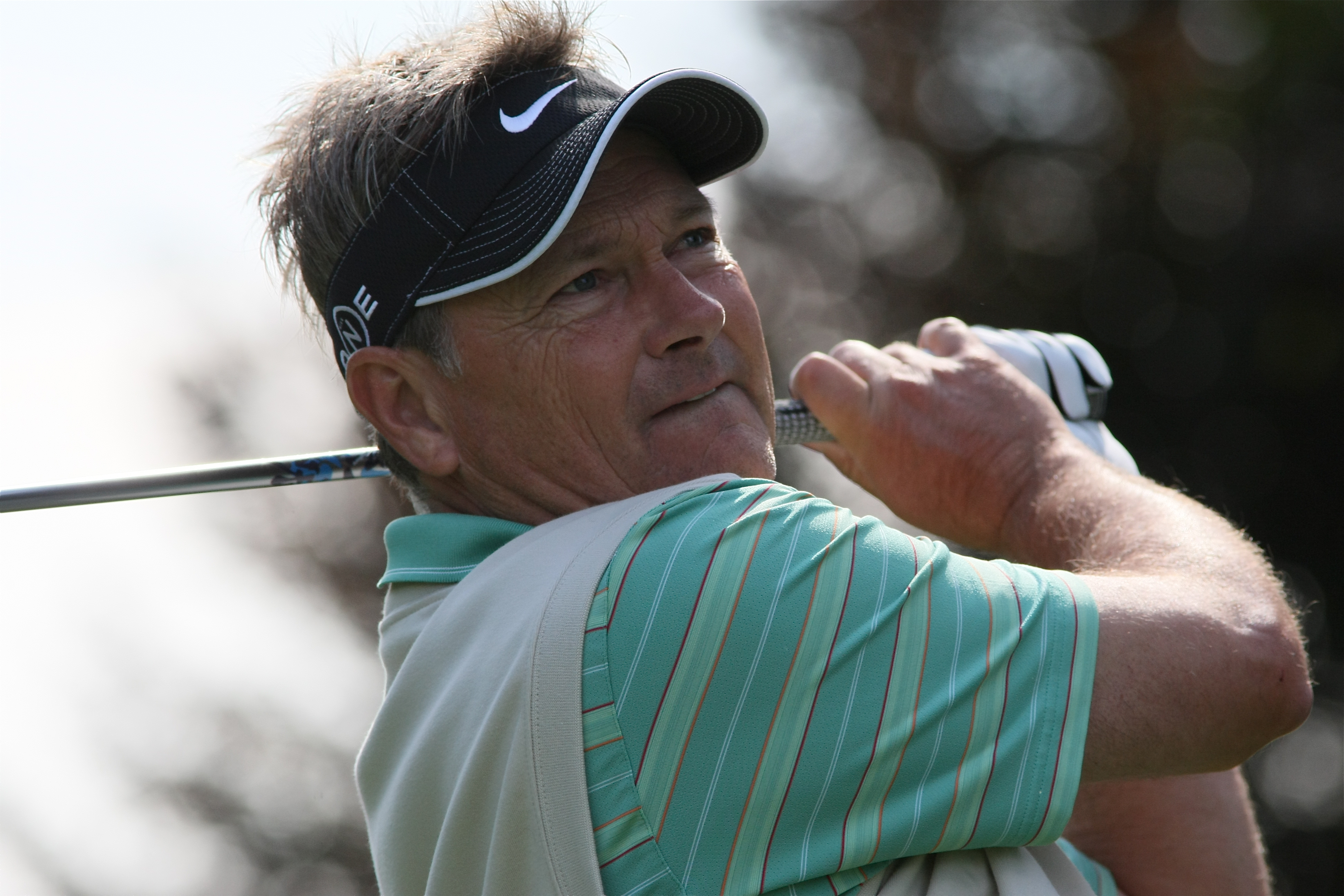

Personal information
- Full name: John Neuman Cook
- Nickname: Cookie
- Nationality: United States
- Born: October 2, 1957 (age 69) Toledo, Ohio, U.S.
- Height: 6 ft 0 in (1.83 m)
- Weight: 175 lb (79 kg; 12.5 st)
- Spouse: Jan
- Children: 3

Career
- Sport: Golf
- College: Ohio State University
- Turned professional: 1979
- Current tour: PGA Tour Champions
- Former tour: PGA Tour
- Professional wins: 28
- Highest ranking: 7 (October 11, 1992)

Number of wins by tour
- PGA Tour: 11
- PGA Tour Champions: 10
- Other: 7

Best results in major championships
- Masters Tournament: T21: 1981
- PGA Championship: T2: 1992
- U.S. Open: T4: 1981
- The Open Championship: 2nd: 1992

Achievements and awards
- PGA Tour Comeback Player of the Year: 1992

John Neuman Cook (born October 2, 1957) is an American professional golfer, who won eleven times on the PGA Tour and was a member of the Ryder Cup team in 1993. He was ranked in the top ten of the Official World Golf Ranking for 45 weeks in 1992 and 1993. Cook currently plays on the PGA Tour Champions and is a studio analyst on Golf Channel.

== Early life ==
Born in Toledo, Ohio, Cook is the son of PGA Tour official Jim Cook and grew up in southern California. He attended Miraleste High School in Rancho Palos Verdes and graduated in 1976. In addition to golf, Cook was a promising but undersized quarterback in football through his sophomore year. He was advised by his high school golf coach (who also coached football) to concentrate on golf, which would give him his best opportunity for a collegiate scholarship. The coach, Wilbur Lucas, later said it was the only time he suggested an athlete drop a sport. Cook was also coached by former PGA Tour star Ken Venturi.

== Amateur career ==
Cook was offered a scholarship to Ohio State University in Columbus, and was personally advised to accept by Jack Nicklaus and Tom Weiskopf. He was a member of the Buckeyes' 1979 NCAA Championship team, which also included Joey Sindelar.

Cook won the U.S. Amateur in 1978 at age 20, and nearly won it again in 1979, falling to Mark O'Meara in the finals. He won the Sunnehanna Amateur in 1977 and 1979 and the California State Amateur in 1975. Cook won the Ohio Amateur in 1978 and 1979, and also won the 1978 and 1979 Northeast Amateur held at Wannamoisett Country Club. Following the 1979 U.S. Amateur in early September, Cook turned professional.

== Professional career ==
Cook played his first PGA Tour event as a professional in September 1979. He played the Anheuser-Busch Golf Classic, the tour's annual event in Napa County, California on a sponsor's exemption. The Associated Press opened its report by stating, "A professional golfing career that will be watched closely, that of 1978 U.S. Amateur golf champion John Cook, began today in Napa's $300,000 PGA Tour event."

Cook's first PGA Tour victory came in the 1981 storm-plagued Bing Crosby National Pro-Am. The event was shortened to 54 holes due to the weather conditions. Cook won the title on the third extra hole after a five-way sudden-death playoff that included Hale Irwin, Bobby Clampett, Ben Crenshaw, and Barney Thompson. Irwin, the last of the four men that Cook eliminated in the playoff, was gracious in defeat: "John is a special young man. He deserved to win. He is one of the best new young players on the tour."

Cook's second PGA Tour win came in 1983 at the Canadian Open. He won with a birdie putt on the sixth extra hole of a playoff against Johnny Miller, after both players parred the first five extra holes.

At the 1990 Las Vegas Invitational, Cook lost a playoff to Bob Tway in memorable fashion. On the first hole of sudden-death, Cook hit a sand wedge shot into the hole from 95 yards for an apparent birdie only to see the ball bounce out of the hole and come to rest 15 feet (4.5 m) away and off the green. Tway won the playoff with a routine par.

In 1992, Cook won three tour events, including a two-shot victory at the United Airlines Hawaiian Open after shooting two closing rounds of 65. He moved into the top-10 of the Official World Golf Ranking for the first time that year.

Cook has had seven top-10 finishes in major championships. The closest he came to winning a major during his career was when he led The Open Championship at Muirfield in 1992 by two shots late in the final round. Cook missed a two-foot (0.6 m) birdie putt on the 17th that would have given him a three-shot lead. He bogeyed the 18th and lost the Open by one stroke to Nick Faldo, who birdied two of the last four holes to overtake Cook. Afterward, Cook said, "I definitely let one slip away. I had a chance to win a major championship and I didn't."

Cook had at least one PGA Tour win from 1996 through 1998. His victory in the FedEx St. Jude Classic in 1996 came after his opening three rounds (64-62-63) broke the lowest total in PGA Tour history for the first 54 holes at 189. He appeared as himself in a non-speaking role in the 1996 film Tin Cup. The last of Cook's eleven PGA Tour wins came in the Reno-Tahoe Open in 2001 at age 43.

=== Senior career ===
In October 2007, Cook became eligible to play on the Champions Tour. In his second start, he won the AT&T Championship in San Antonio, nineteen days after his 50th birthday, two strokes ahead of Mark O'Meara and earned $240,000 for his first win in over six years. A year later, at the same event, he captured his second Champions Tour win, coming from behind with a 65 in the final round to win by three strokes over Keith Fergus.

Cook won his third career title on the Champions Tour in 2009 at the Administaff Small Business Classic by two strokes over Bob Tway and Jay Haas. Two weeks later, Cook picked up his fourth Champions Tour win at the Charles Schwab Cup Championship by five strokes over Russ Cochran. Cook set a scoring record at the tournament, shooting 22-under-par, with a 10-under-par 62 in the second round. Cook successfully defended this title in the 2010 Charles Schwab Cup Championship, winning by two strokes over Michael Allen.

Cook has had some near-misses in senior majors. At the Senior British Open at Royal Troon in 2008, he lost a playoff to Bruce Vaughan. At The Tradition in 2009 at Crosswater in Sunriver, Oregon, Cook bogeyed the 72nd hole and lost a playoff to Mike Reid. In 2011, Fred Couples defeated Cook on the third hole of a sudden-death playoff in the Senior Players Championship at Westchester.

== Personal life ==
Cook currently resides in Windermere, Florida, with his wife Jan. He has three children. His son, Jason, played golf for Pepperdine University in Malibu, California. He is a Republican, and was unwilling to meet Bill Clinton at the White House before the 1993 Ryder Cup due to Clinton's tax hikes.

Cook has helped design a golf course in Ashville, Ohio, with help from his sister Cathy Cook, also a former standout player at nearby Ohio State. The course, formerly known as Cooks Creek Golf Club, has permanently closed.

== Awards and honors ==
Cook was inducted into the Ohio State Varsity O Hall of Fame in 1986.

== Amateur wins ==
- 1975 California State Amateur
- 1977 Sunnehanna Amateur
- 1978 U.S. Amateur, Northeast Amateur, Ohio Amateur
- 1979 Sunnehanna Amateur, Northeast Amateur, Porter Cup, Ohio Amateur

== Professional wins (28) ==
=== PGA Tour wins (11) ===
No.	Date	Tournament	Winning score	To par	Margin of victory	Runner(s)-up
1	Feb 2, 1981	Bing Crosby National Pro-Am	66-71-72=209 (Note: Shortened to 54 holes due to weather.)	−7	Playoff	(United States) Bobby Clampett, (United States) Ben Crenshaw, (United States) Hale Irwin, (United States) Barney Thompson
2	Jul 31, 1983	Canadian Open	68-71-70-68=277	−7	Playoff	(United States) Johnny Miller
3	Aug 16, 1987	The International	11 pts (5-0-4-11=11)		2 points	(United States) Ken Green
4	Jan 19, 1992	Bob Hope Chrysler Classic	65-73-63-69-66=336	−24	Playoff	(United States) Rick Fehr, (United States) Tom Kite, (United States) Mark O'Meara, (United States) Gene Sauers
5	Feb 9, 1992	United Airlines Hawaiian Open	67-68-65-65=265	−23	2 strokes	(United States) Paul Azinger
6	Oct 11, 1992	Las Vegas Invitational	68-66-62-70-68=334	−26	2 strokes	(South Africa) David Frost
7	Jun 23, 1996	FedEx St. Jude Classic	64-62-63-69=258	−26	7 strokes	(United States) John Adams
8	Jul 28, 1996	CVS Charity Classic	65-67-67-69=268	−16	3 strokes	(United States) Russ Cochran
9	Jan 19, 1997	Bob Hope Chrysler Classic (2)	66-69-67-62-63=327	−33	1 stroke	(United States) Mark Calcavecchia
10	May 17, 1998	GTE Byron Nelson Golf Classic	66-68-66-65=265	−15	3 strokes	(United States) Fred Couples, (United States) Harrison Frazar, (United States) Hal Sutton
11	Aug 26, 2001	Reno–Tahoe Open	69-64-74-64=271	−17	1 stroke	(United States) Jerry Kelly

PGA Tour playoff record (3–3)

No.	Year	Tournament	Opponent(s)	Result
1	1981	Bing Crosby National Pro-Am	(United States) Bobby Clampett, (United States) Ben Crenshaw, (United States) Hale Irwin, (United States) Barney Thompson	Won with par on third extra hole Clampett, Crenshaw and Thompson eliminated by birdie on first hole
2	1983	Canadian Open	(United States) Johnny Miller	Won with birdie on sixth extra hole
3	1986	Bob Hope Chrysler Classic	(United States) Donnie Hammond	Lost to birdie on first extra hole
4	1990	Federal Express St. Jude Classic	(United States) Tom Kite	Lost to birdie on first extra hole
5	1990	Las Vegas Invitational	(United States) Bob Tway	Lost to par on first extra hole
6	1992	Bob Hope Chrysler Classic	(United States) Rick Fehr, (United States) Tom Kite, (United States) Mark O'Meara, (United States) Gene Sauers	Won with eagle on fourth extra hole Fehr eliminated by birdie on second hole Kite and O'Meara eliminated by birdie on first hole

=== Latin American wins (2) ===
- 1982 Smirnoff Open (Brazil)
- 1995 Mexican Open

=== Other wins (5) ===
No.	Date	Tournament	Winning score	To par	Margin of victory	Runners-up
1	Dec 11, 1983	World Cup (with (United States) Rex Caldwell)	140-140-145-140=565	−11	7 strokes	Australia − Terry Gale and Wayne Grady, Canada − Jerry Anderson and Dave Barr
2	Aug 23, 1994	Fred Meyer Challenge (with (United States) Mark O'Meara)	63-62=125	−17	Playoff	(United States) Ben Crenshaw and (United States) Phil Mickelson
3	Aug 15, 1995	Ernst Championship	71-63=134	−8	1 stroke	(United States) Jeff Gove
4	Aug 8, 2000	Fred Meyer Challenge (2) (with (United States) Mark O'Meara)	64-61=125	−19	Playoff	(South Africa) David Frost and (United States) Jim Furyk
5	Nov 20, 2010	Gary Player Invitational (with (Spain) Sergio García)	66-66=132	−14	1 stroke	(South Africa) Darren Fichardt and (United States) Bertus Smit

Other playoff record (2–1)

No.	Year	Tournament	Opponents	Result
1	1994	Fred Meyer Challenge (with (United States) Mark O'Meara)	(United States) Ben Crenshaw and (United States) Phil Mickelson	Won with par on second extra hole
2	1998	Franklin Templeton Shark Shootout (with (United States) Peter Jacobsen)	(Australia) Steve Elkington and (Australia) Greg Norman	Lost to birdie on third extra hole
3	2000	Fred Meyer Challenge (with (United States) Mark O'Meara)	(South Africa) David Frost and (United States) Jim Furyk	Won with birdie on first extra hole

=== Champions Tour wins (10) ===
Legend
Tour Championships (2)
Other Champions Tour (8)

No.	Date	Tournament	Winning score	To par	Margin of victory	Runner(s)-up
1	Oct 21, 2007	AT&T Championship	65-68-65=198	−15	2 strokes	(United States) Mark O'Meara
2	Oct 26, 2008	AT&T Championship (2)	69-63-65=197	−16	3 strokes	(United States) Keith Fergus
3	Oct 18, 2009	Administaff Small Business Classic	65-72-68=205	−11	2 strokes	(United States) Jay Haas, (United States) Bob Tway
4	Nov 1, 2009	Charles Schwab Cup Championship	68-62-67-69=266	−22	5 strokes	(United States) Russ Cochran
5	Nov 8, 2010	Charles Schwab Cup Championship (2)	64-69-67-67=267	−17	2 strokes	(United States) Michael Allen
6	Jan 23, 2011	Mitsubishi Electric Championship at Hualalai	66-64-64=194	−22	2 strokes	(United States) Tom Lehman
7	Apr 17, 2011	Outback Steakhouse Pro-Am	66-65-73=204	−9	Playoff	(United States) Jay Don Blake
8	Jul 3, 2011	Montreal Championship	63-66-66=195	−21	3 strokes	(Taiwan) Lu Chien-soon
9	Jan 20, 2013	Mitsubishi Electric Championship at Hualalai (2)	66-66-67=199	−17	Playoff	(South Africa) David Frost
10	Sep 28, 2014	Nature Valley First Tee Open at Pebble Beach	67-68-69=204	−11	1 stroke	(United States) Tom Byrum

Champions Tour playoff record (2–6)

No.	Year	Tournament	Opponent(s)	Result
1	2008	The Senior Open Championship	(United States) Bruce Vaughan	Lost to birdie on first extra hole
2	2009	JELD-WEN Tradition	(United States) Mike Reid	Lost to birdie on first extra hole
3	2010	Allianz Championship	(Germany) Bernhard Langer	Lost to eagle on first extra hole
4	2010	Liberty Mutual Legends of Golf (with (United States) Joey Sindelar)	(United States) Mark O'Meara and (Zimbabwe) Nick Price	Lost to par on second extra hole
5	2011	Outback Steakhouse Pro-Am	(United States) Jay Don Blake	Won with birdie on first extra hole
6	2011	Constellation Energy Senior Players Championship	(United States) Fred Couples	Lost to birdie on third extra hole
7	2011	Songdo IBD Championship	(United States) Jay Don Blake, (United States) Mark O'Meara, (Australia) Peter Senior	Blake won with birdie on fifth extra hole O'Meara and Senior eliminated by par on third hole
8	2013	Mitsubishi Electric Championship at Hualalai	(South Africa) David Frost	Won with birdie on second extra hole

== Results in major championships ==
Tournament	1977	1978	1979
Masters Tournament			39
U.S. Open	CUT		T53
The Open Championship			
PGA Championship			

Tournament	1980	1981	1982	1983	1984	1985	1986	1987	1988	1989
Masters Tournament		T21	CUT		CUT			T24	CUT	
U.S. Open	T53	T4	CUT		CUT	CUT	T35	T36	T50	
The Open Championship	CUT									
PGA Championship		T19	T34	T20	CUT		T53	T28	T48	

Tournament	1990	1991	1992	1993	1994	1995	1996	1997	1998	1999
Masters Tournament		CUT	T54	T39	T46	CUT		CUT	43	CUT
U.S. Open		T19	T13	T25	5	T62	T16	T36	CUT	T60
The Open Championship			2	CUT	T55	T40		CUT		
PGA Championship		CUT	T2	T6	T4	CUT	T47	T23	9	CUT

Tournament	2000	2001	2002	2003	2004	2005	2006
Masters Tournament				CUT			
U.S. Open	CUT		CUT			T15	T40
The Open Championship			CUT				
PGA Championship			CUT				

Top 10
Did not play

CUT = missed the half-way cut
"T" = tied

=== Summary ===
Tournament	Wins	2nd	3rd	Top-5	Top-10	Top-25	Events	Cuts made
Masters Tournament	0	0	0	0	0	2	15	7
U.S. Open	0	0	0	2	2	7	23	16
The Open Championship	0	1	0	1	1	1	7	3
PGA Championship	0	1	0	2	4	7	17	12
Totals	0	2	0	5	7	17	62	38

- Most consecutive cuts made – 6 (1992 Masters – 1993 U.S. Open)
- Longest streak of top-10s – 2 (1992 Open Championship – 1992 PGA)

== Results in The Players Championship ==
Tournament	1981	1982	1983	1984	1985	1986	1987	1988	1989	1990	1991	1992	1993	1994	1995	1996	1997	1998	1999	2000	2001	2002	2003
The Players Championship	CUT	T41	T3	T44	CUT	T7	CUT	CUT	CUT		T3	CUT	CUT	T23	WD	CUT	T22	T13	T58	CUT	T55	CUT	WD

Top 10
Did not play

CUT = missed the halfway cut
WD = withdrew
"T" indicates a tie for a place

== Results in World Golf Championships ==
Tournament	1999	2000	2001	2002	2003
Match Play	R64			R16	R64
Championship			NT^{1}	T49	
Invitational				T28	

^{1}Cancelled due to 9/11

Top 10
Did not play

QF, R16, R32, R64 = Round in which player lost in match play
"T" = Tied
NT = No tournament

== Results in senior major championships ==
Results are not in chronological order prior to 2017.

Tournament	2008	2009	2010	2011	2012	2013	2014	2015	2016	2017	2018	2019
The Tradition	T14	2	T6	T25	T38		T6	T29				
Senior PGA Championship	T16	T17	T36	T13	2		T21	T66				
U.S. Senior Open	5	T19	T3	CUT	T6	T35	T24	CUT	CUT	CUT	T44	CUT
Senior Players Championship	T7	T5	65	2	T20	T36	T12	T47	T54			T54
Senior British Open Championship	2	CUT	T11	11	T6	T61	T64	CUT				

Top 10
Did not play

CUT = missed the halfway cut
"T" indicates a tie for a place

== U.S. national team appearances ==
Amateur

- Eisenhower Trophy: 1978 (winners)

Professional

- World Cup: 1983 (winners)
- Ryder Cup: 1993 (winners)
- UBS Warburg Cup: 2001 (winners)

== See also ==
- Fall 1979 PGA Tour Qualifying School graduates
- List of golfers with most Champions Tour wins
