= 1998 PGA Tour =

Golf tour season

1998 PGA Tour season
- Duration: January 8, 1998 – November 1, 1998
- Number of official events: 45
- Most wins: (United States) David Duval (4)
- Money list: (United States) David Duval
- PGA Tour Player of the Year: (United States) Mark O'Meara
- PGA Player of the Year: (United States) Mark O'Meara
- Rookie of the Year: (United States) Steve Flesch

The 1998 PGA Tour was the 83rd season of the PGA Tour, the main professional golf tour in the United States. It was also the 30th season since separating from the PGA of America.

== Schedule ==
The following table lists official events during the 1998 season.

Date	Tournament	Location	Purse (US$)	Winner (Note: The number in parentheses after each winner's name is the number of PGA Tour events they had won up to and including that tournament. This information is only shown for PGA Tour members.)	OWGR points	Notes
Jan 11	Mercedes Championships	California	1,700,000	(United States) Phil Mickelson (12)	58	Winners-only event
Jan 18	Bob Hope Chrysler Classic	California	2,300,000	(United States) Fred Couples (13)	48	Pro-Am
Jan 25	Phoenix Open	Arizona	2,500,000	(Sweden) Jesper Parnevik (1)	54	
Feb 8	Buick Invitational	California	2,100,000	(United States) Scott Simpson (7)	40	
Feb 15	United Airlines Hawaiian Open	Hawaii	1,800,000	(United States) John Huston (4)	40	
Feb 22	Tucson Chrysler Classic	Arizona	2,000,000	(United States) David Duval (4)	50	
Mar 1	Nissan Open	California	2,100,000	(United States) Billy Mayfair (4)	50	
Mar 8	Doral-Ryder Open	Florida	2,000,000	(United States) Michael Bradley (2)	60	
Mar 15	Honda Classic	Florida	1,800,000	(United States) Mark Calcavecchia (10)	50	
Mar 22	Bay Hill Invitational	Florida	2,000,000	(South Africa) Ernie Els (6)	72	Invitational
Mar 29	The Players Championship	Florida	4,000,000	(United States) Justin Leonard (4)	80	Flagship event
Apr 5	Freeport-McDermott Classic	Louisiana	1,700,000	(England) Lee Westwood (1)	44	
Apr 12	Masters Tournament	Georgia	3,200,000	(United States) Mark O'Meara (15)	100	Major championship
Apr 19	MCI Classic	South Carolina	1,900,000	(United States) Davis Love III (13)	60	Invitational
Apr 26	Greater Greensboro Chrysler Classic	North Carolina	2,200,000	(Namibia) Trevor Dodds (1)	42	
May 3	Shell Houston Open	Texas	2,000,000	(United States) David Duval (5)	42	
May 10	BellSouth Classic	Georgia	1,800,000	(United States) Tiger Woods (7)	48	
May 17	GTE Byron Nelson Golf Classic	Texas	2,500,000	(United States) John Cook (10)	60	
May 24	MasterCard Colonial	Texas	2,300,000	(United States) Tom Watson (39)	58	Invitational
May 31	Memorial Tournament	Ohio	2,200,000	(United States) Fred Couples (14)	66	Invitational
Jun 7	Kemper Open	Maryland	2,000,000	(Australia) Stuart Appleby (2)	46	
Jun 14	Buick Classic	New York	1,800,000	(United States) J. P. Hayes (1)	40	
Jun 21	U.S. Open	California	3,000,000	(United States) Lee Janzen (8)	100	Major championship
Jun 28	Motorola Western Open	Illinois	2,200,000	(United States) Joe Durant (1)	54	
Jul 5	Canon Greater Hartford Open	Connecticut	2,000,000	(United States) Olin Browne (1)	50	
Jul 12	Quad City Classic	Illinois	1,550,000	(United States) Steve Jones (8)	22	
Jul 19	The Open Championship	England	£1,700,000	(United States) Mark O'Meara (16)	100	Major championship
Jul 19	Deposit Guaranty Golf Classic	Mississippi	1,200,000	(United States) Fred Funk (5)	20	Alternate event
Jul 26	CVS Charity Classic	Massachusetts	1,500,000	(United States) Steve Pate (6)	32	
Aug 2	FedEx St. Jude Classic	Tennessee	1,800,000	(Zimbabwe) Nick Price (17)	44	
Aug 9	Buick Open	Michigan	1,800,000	(United States) Billy Mayfair (5)	44	
Aug 16	PGA Championship	Washington	3,000,000	(Fiji) Vijay Singh (6)	100	Major championship
Aug 17 (Note: First two rounds played in January.)	AT&T Pebble Beach National Pro-Am	California	2,500,000	(United States) Phil Mickelson (13)	44	Pro-Am
Aug 23	Sprint International	Colorado	2,000,000	(Fiji) Vijay Singh (7)	62	
Aug 30	NEC World Series of Golf	Ohio	2,250,000	(United States) David Duval (6)	62	Limited-field event
Aug 30	Greater Vancouver Open	Canada	2,000,000	(United States) Brandel Chamblee (1)	30	Alternate event
Sep 6	Greater Milwaukee Open	Wisconsin	1,800,000	(United States) Jeff Sluman (3)	38	
Sep 13	Bell Canadian Open	Canada	2,200,000	(United States) Billy Andrade (3)	42	
Sep 20	B.C. Open	New York	1,500,000	(United States) Chris Perry (1)	24	
Sep 27	Westin Texas Open	Texas	1,700,000	(United States) Hal Sutton (9)	36	
Oct 4	Buick Challenge	Georgia	1,500,000	(Australia) Steve Elkington (9)	54	
Oct 11	Michelob Championship at Kingsmill	Virginia	1,900,000	(United States) David Duval (7)	46	
Oct 18	Las Vegas Invitational	Nevada	2,000,000	(United States) Jim Furyk (3)	48	
Oct 23	National Car Rental Golf Classic Disney	Florida	2,000,000	(United States) John Huston (5)	58	
Nov 1	The Tour Championship	Georgia	4,000,000	(United States) Hal Sutton (10)	60	Tour Championship

=== Unofficial events ===
The following events were sanctioned by the PGA Tour, but did not carry official money, nor were wins official.

Date	Tournament	Location	Purse ($)	Winner(s)	OWGR points	Notes
Jan 4	Andersen Consulting World Championship of Golf	Arizona	3,650,000	(Scotland) Colin Montgomerie	58	Limited-field event
Nov 8	Subaru Sarazen World Open	Georgia	2,000,000	(United States) Dudley Hart	38	
Nov 15	Franklin Templeton Shark Shootout	California	1,300,000	(Australia) Steve Elkington and (Australia) Greg Norman	n/a	Team event
Nov 19	PGA Grand Slam of Golf	Hawaii	1,000,000	(United States) Tiger Woods	n/a	Limited-field event
Nov 22	World Cup of Golf	New Zealand	1,300,000	(England) David Carter and (England) Nick Faldo	n/a	Team event
Nov 22	World Cup of Golf Individual Trophy	New Zealand	200,000	(United States) Scott Verplank	n/a	
Nov 29	Skins Game	California	600,000	(United States) Mark O'Meara	n/a	Limited-field event
Dec 6	JCPenney Classic	Florida	875,000	(United States) Meg Mallon and (United States) Steve Pate	n/a	Team event
Dec 13	Presidents Cup	Australia	n/a	Team International	n/a	Team event

== Money list ==
The money list was based on prize money won during the season, calculated in U.S. dollars.

Position	Player	Prize money ($)
1	(United States) David Duval	2,591,031
2	(Fiji) Vijay Singh	2,238,998
3	(United States) Jim Furyk	2,054,334
4	(United States) Tiger Woods	1,841,117
5	(United States) Hal Sutton	1,838,740
6	(United States) Phil Mickelson	1,837,246
7	(United States) Mark O'Meara	1,786,699
8	(United States) Justin Leonard	1,671,823
9	(United States) Fred Couples	1,650,389
10	(United States) John Huston	1,544,110

== Awards ==
Award	Winner	Ref.
PGA Tour Player of the Year (Jack Nicklaus Trophy)	(United States) Mark O'Meara	
PGA Player of the Year	(United States) Mark O'Meara	
Rookie of the Year	(United States) Steve Flesch	
Scoring leader (PGA Tour – Byron Nelson Award)	(United States) David Duval	
Scoring leader (PGA – Vardon Trophy)	(United States) David Duval	
Comeback Player of the Year	(United States) Scott Verplank	

== See also ==
- 1998 Nike Tour
- 1998 Senior PGA Tour
