= Jay Don Blake =

American professional golfer (born 1958)

Personal information
- Full name: Jay Don Blake
- Nationality: United States
- Born: October 28, 1958 (age 68) St. George, Utah, U.S.
- Height: 6 ft 2 in (1.88 m)
- Weight: 190 lb (86 kg; 14 st)

Career
- Sport: Golf
- College: Utah State University
- Turned professional: 1981
- Current tour: PGA Tour Champions
- Former tour: PGA Tour
- Professional wins: 7
- Highest ranking: 63 (June 28, 1992)

Number of wins by tour
- PGA Tour: 1
- PGA Tour Champions: 3
- Other: 3

Best results in major championships
- Masters Tournament: T27: 1991
- PGA Championship: T13: 1991
- U.S. Open: T6: 1992
- The Open Championship: T64: 1991

Jay Don Blake (born October 28, 1958) is an American professional golfer who has played on the PGA Tour and the Nationwide Tour and, after turning 50, on the PGA Tour Champions.

== Early life and amateur career ==
Blake was born and raised in St. George, Utah, where he attended Dixie High School, graduating in 1977. Blake learned the game of golf on the public Dixie Red Hills Golf Course. He attended Utah State University in Logan and was a member of the golf team. He won the 1980 NCAA Championship and was named NCAA Player of the Year in 1981.

== Professional career ==
In 1981, Blake turned pro. He joined the PGA Tour in 1987.

Although Blake has only one victory on the PGA Tour, he earned a spot in the top-125 for 15 consecutive years after joining the tour in 1987. Blake has more than three dozen top-10 finishes in official PGA Tour events including more than a half-dozen seconds and thirds. Blake's best career year was 1991 when he had six top-10 finishes, including one tour win, $563,854 in earnings and finished 21st on the final money list; he also had a win in international competition that year. His best finish in a major championship is T6 at the 1992 U.S. Open.

In his late 40s, Blake played mostly in Nationwide Tour events. He began playing on the Champions Tour in 2009. He earned his first win in September 2011 at the Songdo IBD Championship in South Korea then picked up his second victory of the year at the season ending Charles Schwab Cup Championship.

Blake made 500th PGA Tour start in October 2024 at the Black Desert Championship at the age of 65.

== Personal life ==
Blake lives in St. George, Utah.

== Amateur wins ==
- 1980 NCAA Division I Championship (individual medalist)

== Professional wins (7) ==
=== PGA Tour wins (1) ===
No.	Date	Tournament	Winning score	Margin of victory	Runner-up
1	Feb 17, 1991	Shearson Lehman Brothers Open	−20 (69-65-67-67=268)	2 strokes	(United States) Bill Sander

=== Other wins (3) ===
- 1988 Utah Open
- 1991 Argentine Open
- 1994 Jerry Ford Invitational

=== Champions Tour wins (3) ===
Legend
Tour Championships (1)
Other Champions Tour (2)

No.	Date	Tournament	Winning score	Margin of victory	Runner(s)-up
1	Sep 18, 2011	Songdo IBD Championship	−13 (68-67-68=203)	Playoff	(United States) John Cook, (United States) Mark O'Meara, (Australia) Peter Senior
2	Nov 6, 2011	Charles Schwab Cup Championship	−8 (71-68-66-71=276)	2 strokes	(United States) Michael Allen, (United States) Mark Calcavecchia, (United States) Jay Haas, (United States) Loren Roberts
3	Aug 26, 2012	Boeing Classic	−10 (68-70-68=206)	Playoff	(United States) Mark O'Meara

Champions Tour playoff record (2–1)

No.	Year	Tournament	Opponent(s)	Result
1	2011	Outback Steakhouse Pro-Am	(United States) John Cook	Lost to birdie on first extra hole
2	2011	Songdo IBD Championship	(United States) John Cook, (United States) Mark O'Meara, (Australia) Peter Senior	Won with birdie on fifth extra hole O'Meara and Senior eliminated by par on third hole
3	2012	Boeing Classic	(United States) Mark O'Meara	Won with birdie on second extra hole

== Playoff record ==
PGA of Japan Tour playoff record (0–1)

No.	Year	Tournament	Opponent(s)	Result
1	1991	Dunlop Phoenix Tournament	(Japan) Isao Aoki, (Spain) Seve Ballesteros, (United States) Larry Nelson	Nelson won with par on fourth extra hole Ballesteros eliminated by birdie on third hole Blake eliminated by par on first hole

== Results in major championships ==
Tournament	1980	1981	1982	1983	1984	1985	1986	1987	1988	1989
Masters Tournament										
U.S. Open	CUT		CUT					T24		T18
The Open Championship										
PGA Championship									T25	CUT

Tournament	1990	1991	1992	1993	1994	1995	1996	1997	1998	1999
Masters Tournament		T27	CUT	T45						
U.S. Open	CUT		T6	T62	CUT			CUT		
The Open Championship		T64								
PGA Championship	WD	T13	T76		T66	CUT	CUT	CUT	T56	

Tournament	2000	2001	2002	2003	2004	2005	2006	2007	2008	2009
Masters Tournament										
U.S. Open		CUT	CUT	T64						
The Open Championship										
PGA Championship	CUT									

Tournament	2010	2011	2012	2013
Masters Tournament				
U.S. Open				CUT
The Open Championship				
PGA Championship				

Top 10
Did not play

CUT = missed the half-way cut
WD = withdrew
"T" = tied

=== Summary ===
Tournament	Wins	2nd	3rd	Top-5	Top-10	Top-25	Events	Cuts made
Masters Tournament	0	0	0	0	0	0	3	2
U.S. Open	0	0	0	0	1	3	13	5
The Open Championship	0	0	0	0	0	0	1	1
PGA Championship	0	0	0	0	0	2	11	5
Totals	0	0	0	0	1	5	28	13

- Most consecutive cuts made – 4 (1992 U.S. Open - 1993 U.S. Open)
- Longest streak of top-10s – 1

== Results in senior major championships ==
Results not in chronological order prior to 2021.

Tournament	2009	2010	2011	2012	2013	2014	2015	2016	2017	2018	2019	2020	2021
The Tradition		T47	T18	T21			T34	T72	T20	T53		NT	
Senior PGA Championship	T28	T8	T27	T29			T66	CUT	T59	75		NT	
Senior Players Championship	T15	T33	T13	T20	T36		T54	T9	T23	74			76
U.S. Senior Open				T22	T35							NT	
Senior British Open Championship	CUT	T3	CUT	T10	CUT		T40					NT	

Top 10
Did not play

CUT = missed the halfway cut
"T" indicates a tie for a place
NT = No tournament due to COVID-19 pandemic

== See also ==
- 1986 PGA Tour Qualifying School graduates
