= Mark O'Meara =

American professional golfer (born 1957)

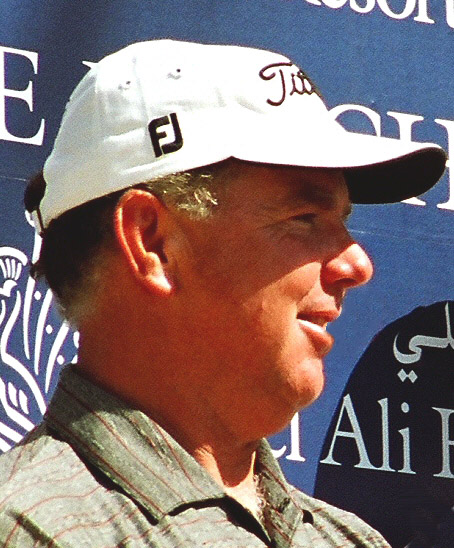
- O'Meara in 2005

Personal information
- Full name: Mark Francis O'Meara
- Nationality: United States
- Born: January 13, 1957 (age 69) Goldsboro, North Carolina, U.S.
- Height: 6 ft 0 in (1.83 m)
- Weight: 195 lb (88 kg; 13.9 st)
- Spouses: Alicia Lauria O'Meara (m. 1980; div. 2009) Meredith O'Meara
- Children: 3

Career
- Sport: Golf
- College: Long Beach State University
- Turned professional: 1980
- Current tour: PGA Tour Champions
- Former tour: PGA Tour
- Professional wins: 34
- Highest ranking: 2 (September 6, 1998)

Number of wins by tour
- PGA Tour: 16
- European Tour: 5
- Japan Golf Tour: 2
- PGA Tour of Australasia: 1
- PGA Tour Champions: 3
- Other: 9

Best results in major championships (wins: 2)
- Masters Tournament: Won: 1998
- PGA Championship: T4: 1998
- U.S. Open: T3: 1988
- The Open Championship: Won: 1998

Achievements and awards
- World Golf Hall of Fame: 2015 (member page)
- PGA Tour Rookie of the Year: 1981
- PGA Tour Player of the Year: 1998
- PGA Player of the Year: 1998

Mark Francis O'Meara (born January 13, 1957) is an American retired professional golfer. He won tournaments on the PGA Tour and around the world from the mid-1980s to the late 1990s. He spent nearly 200 weeks in the top-10 of the Official World Golf Ranking from their debut in 1986 to 2000. He won two major championships, the 1998 Masters Tournament and the 1998 Open Championship, becoming the oldest player to win two majors in a year. He was inducted into the World Golf Hall of Fame in 2015.

== Early life ==
O'Meara was born in Goldsboro, North Carolina and grew up in Mission Viejo, California. He took up golf at 13, sneaking into the nearby Mission Viejo Country Club. O'Meara later became an employee of the club and played on his high school golf team.

O'Meara was an All-American at Long Beach State in Long Beach, California, and won the U.S. Amateur in 1979, defeating defending champion John Cook, 8 and 7, in the final.

== Professional career ==
After graduating with a degree in marketing in 1980, O'Meara turned professional and would win 16 events on the PGA Tour, beginning with the Greater Milwaukee Open in 1984, and the AT&T Pebble Beach National Pro-Am five times. His best year as a professional golfer came relatively late in his career–in 1998 at age 41–when he won two majors: The Masters and the British Open. O'Meara's victory in The Masters came during his 15th attempt. O'Meara attributed this resurgence partly to the inspiration of working with Tiger Woods, the new superstar of the game at the time, with whom O'Meara had become good friends. In the same year, he won the Cisco World Match Play Championship and reached a career best of second in the Official World Golf Ranking.

O'Meara is known for competing outside the United States more often than most leading American golfers, and has won tournaments in Europe, Asia, Australia and South America. In the new millennium his form took a downturn and he began to struggle with injuries, but in 2004 he won an official tour event for the first time since 1998, taking the Dubai Desert Classic title, which despite being played in the Middle East is a European Tour event.

After the European Tour Lancome Trophy tournament at Golf de Saint-Nom-la-Bretèche in September 1997, which was won by O'Meara, he was involved in a controversy. A television viewer in Sweden observed that, on the 15th green in the final round, O'Meara, facing a two and a half foot putt, had replaced his ball half an inch closer to the hole than had been indicated by his marker. Tournament runner-up Jarmo Sandelin of Sweden wrote to O'Meara in March 1998, sending a video recording of the incident and asking for an explanation. O'Meara insisted he had not intended to gain any advantage and sought advice from the PGA and European Tours, who informed him that the tournament was over and the result stood. Sandelin went public with the story and demanded that O'Meara hand back the trophy and the prize money. O'Meara admitted in April 1998 that he may have, without intention, misplaced the ball.

=== Senior career ===
In 2007, O'Meara began play on the Champions Tour; he had many top-10 finishes in his first three seasons including several runner-up finishes, but no wins. In 2010, he broke through with a win in the Liberty Mutual Legends of Golf with Nick Price, followed by his first senior major victory in the Constellation Energy Senior Players Championship. O'Meara was sidelined by a rib injury for several months starting in April 2012; he missed the majors on both tours and did not compete until August.

In the early 2000s, O'Meara began to develop a golf course design practice and he enjoys fishing in his off time. The first course he designed opened in May 2001 at the Grandview Golf Club in Huntsville, Ontario. He is a brand ambassador for Pacific Links International. In March 2019, O'Meara won the Cologuard Classic in Tucson, Arizona. He shot a final round seven-under 66, to win by four shots. This win ended an eight-year win drought on the PGA Tour Champions. O'Meara retired in September 2024 after the PURE Insurance Championship, having announced that it would be his last professional event, and missing the cut.

== Personal life ==
O'Meara was a former resident of Orlando, Florida and lived in the same neighborhood as Tiger Woods. They became good friends and frequently golfed together during that time. O'Meara resides in Southern Highlands, Nevada.

== Awards and recognition ==
- In 1981, O'Meara earned PGA Tour Rookie of the Year
- In 1998, he received that year's BBC Overseas Sports Personality of the Year, an award given to a non-British sportsperson considered to have made the most substantial contribution to a sport in a year.
- In 1998, O'Meara earned PGA Tour Player of the Year honors
- In 1998, he earned PGA Player of the Year honors
- In 2015, O'Meara was inducted into the World Golf Hall of Fame.

== Amateur wins ==
- 1979 U.S. Amateur, California State Amateur Championship

== Professional wins (34) ==
=== PGA Tour wins (16) ===
Legend
Major championships (2)
Other PGA Tour (14)

| No. | Date | Tournament | Winning score | To par | Margin of victory | Runner(s)-up |
|---|---|---|---|---|---|---|
| 1 | Sep 16, 1984 | Greater Milwaukee Open | 67-68-69-68=272 | −16 | 5 strokes | (United States) Tom Watson |
| 2 | Feb 3, 1985 | Bing Crosby National Pro-Am | 70-72-68-73=283 | −5 | 1 stroke | (Japan) Kikuo Arai, (United States) Larry Rinker, (United States) Curtis Strange |
| 3 | Feb 10, 1985 | Hawaiian Open | 67-66-65-69=267 | −21 | 1 stroke | (United States) Craig Stadler |
| 4 | Jan 29, 1989 | AT&T Pebble Beach National Pro-Am (2) | 66-68-73-70=277 | −11 | 1 stroke | (United States) Tom Kite |
| 5 | Feb 4, 1990 | AT&T Pebble Beach National Pro-Am (3) | 67-73-69-72=281 | −7 | 2 strokes | (United States) Kenny Perry |
| 6 | Oct 7, 1990 | H.E.B. Texas Open | 64-68-66-63=261 | −19 | 1 stroke | (United States) Gary Hallberg |
| 7 | Oct 19, 1991 | Walt Disney World/Oldsmobile Classic | 66-66-71-64=267 | −21 | 1 stroke | (United States) David Peoples |
| 8 | Feb 2, 1992 | AT&T Pebble Beach National Pro-Am (4) | 69-68-68-70=275 | −13 | Playoff | (United States) Jeff Sluman |
| 9 | Mar 12, 1995 | Honda Classic | 68-65-71-71=275 | −9 | 1 stroke | (England) Nick Faldo |
| 10 | Sep 10, 1995 | Bell Canadian Open | 72-67-68-67=274 | −14 | Playoff | (United States) Bob Lohr |
| 11 | Jan 7, 1996 | Mercedes Championships | 68-69-66-68=271 | −17 | 3 strokes | (England) Nick Faldo, (United States) Scott Hoch |
| 12 | Apr 28, 1996 | Greater Greensboro Chrysler Classic | 75-68-62-69=274 | −14 | 2 strokes | (United States) Duffy Waldorf |
| 13 | Feb 2, 1997 | AT&T Pebble Beach National Pro-Am (5) | 67-67-67-67=268 | −20 | 1 stroke | (United States) David Duval, (United States) Tiger Woods |
| 14 | Feb 9, 1997 | Buick Invitational | 67-66-71-71=275 | −13 | 2 strokes | (United States) David Ogrin, (United States) Donnie Hammond, (Sweden) Jesper Parnevik, (United States) Craig Stadler, (United States) Lee Janzen, (United States) Mike Hulbert, (United States) Duffy Waldorf |
| 15 | Apr 12, 1998 | Masters Tournament | 74-70-68-67=279 | −9 | 1 stroke | (United States) Fred Couples, (United States) David Duval |
| 16 | Jul 19, 1998 | The Open Championship | 72-68-72-68=280 | E | Playoff | (United States) Brian Watts |

PGA Tour playoff record (3–4)

| No. | Year | Tournament | Opponent(s) | Result |
|---|---|---|---|---|
| 1 | 1981 | Tallahassee Open | (United States) Dave Eichelberger, (United States) Bob Murphy | Eichelberger won with birdie on first extra hole |
| 2 | 1983 | Phoenix Open | (United States) Rex Caldwell, (United States) Bob Gilder, (United States) Johnny Miller | Gilder won with birdie on eighth extra hole Miller and O'Meara eliminated by birdie on second hole |
| 3 | 1991 | Bob Hope Chrysler Classic | (United States) Corey Pavin | Lost to birdie on first extra hole |
| 4 | 1992 | Bob Hope Chrysler Classic | (United States) John Cook, (United States) Rick Fehr, (United States) Tom Kite, (United States) Gene Sauers | Cook won with eagle on fourth extra hole Fehr eliminated by birdie on second hole Kite and O'Meara eliminated by birdie on first hole |
| 5 | 1992 | AT&T Pebble Beach National Pro-Am | (United States) Jeff Sluman | Won with par on first extra hole |
| 6 | 1995 | Bell Canadian Open | (United States) Bob Lohr | Won with par on first extra hole |
| 7 | 1998 | The Open Championship | (United States) Brian Watts | Won four-hole aggregate playoff; O'Meara: −1 (4-4-5-4=17), Watts: +1 (5-4-5-5=19) |

=== European Tour wins (5) ===
Legend
Major championships (2)
Other European Tour (3)

| No. | Date | Tournament | Winning score | To par | Margin of victory | Runner(s)-up |
|---|---|---|---|---|---|---|
| 1 | Aug 23, 1987 | Lawrence Batley International | 71-64-70-66=271 | −17 | 3 strokes | (England) Carl Mason |
| 2 | Sep 14, 1997 | Trophée Lancôme | 69-67-66-69=271 | −13 | 1 stroke | (Sweden) Jarmo Sandelin |
| 3 | Apr 12, 1998 | Masters Tournament | 74-70-68-67=279 | −9 | 1 stroke | (United States) Fred Couples, (United States) David Duval |
| 4 | Jul 19, 1998 | The Open Championship | 72-68-72-68=280 | E | Playoff | (United States) Brian Watts |
| 5 | Mar 7, 2004 | Dubai Desert Classic | 70-64-68-69=271 | −17 | 1 stroke | (Republic of Ireland) Paul McGinley |

European Tour playoff record (1–0)

| No. | Year | Tournament | Opponent | Result |
|---|---|---|---|---|
| 1 | 1998 | The Open Championship | (United States) Brian Watts | Won four-hole aggregate playoff; O'Meara: −1 (4-4-5-4=17), Watts: +1 (5-4-5-5=19) |

=== PGA of Japan Tour wins (2) ===
| No. | Date | Tournament | Winning score | To par | Margin of victory | Runner-up |
|---|---|---|---|---|---|---|
| 1 | May 12, 1985 | Fujisankei Classic | 67-67-66-73=273 | −11 | 3 strokes | (Japan) Masashi Ozaki |
| 2 | Oct 4, 1992 | Tokai Classic | 66-68-72-71=277 | −11 | 1 stroke | (United States) Tom Kite |

=== PGA Tour of Australia wins (1) ===
| No. | Date | Tournament | Winning score | To par | Margin of victory | Runner-up |
|---|---|---|---|---|---|---|
| 1 | Feb 23, 1986 | Australian Masters | 74-66-71-73=284 | −8 | 1 stroke | (Australia) David Graham |

=== South American Tour wins (1) ===
- 1994 Argentine Open

=== Other wins (8) ===
| No. | Date | Tournament | Winning score | To par | Margin of victory | Runner(s)-up |
|---|---|---|---|---|---|---|
| 1 | Nov 16, 1985 | Isuzu Kapalua International | 67-70-70-68=275 | −13 | Playoff | (United States) Corey Pavin |
| 2 | Nov 19, 1989 | RMCC Invitational (with (United States) Curtis Strange) | 66-62-62=190 | −26 | 6 strokes | (West Germany) Bernhard Langer and (United States) John Mahaffey, (United States) Lanny Wadkins and (United States) Tom Weiskopf |
| 3 | Aug 23, 1994 | Fred Meyer Challenge (with (United States) John Cook) | 63-62=125 | −17 | Playoff | (United States) Ben Crenshaw and (United States) Phil Mickelson |
| 4 | Oct 18, 1998 | Cisco World Match Play Championship | 1 up | | | (United States) Tiger Woods |
| 5 | Nov 29, 1998 | Skins Game | $405,000 | | $10,000 | (United States) Tom Lehman |
| 6 | Nov 21, 1999 | World Cup of Golf (with (United States) Tiger Woods) | 140-133-130-142=545 | −23 | 5 strokes | Spain − Santiago Luna and Miguel Ángel Martín |
| 7 | Aug 8, 2000 | Fred Meyer Challenge (2) (with (United States) John Cook) | 64-61=125 | −19 | Playoff | (South Africa) David Frost and (United States) Jim Furyk |
| 8 | Dec 1, 2002 | Skins Game (2) | $405,000 | | $105,000 | (United States) Phil Mickelson |

Other playoff record (3–0)

| No. | Year | Tournament | Opponent(s) | Result |
|---|---|---|---|---|
| 1 | 1985 | Isuzu Kapalua International | (United States) Corey Pavin | Won with birdie on third extra hole |
| 2 | 1994 | Fred Meyer Challenge (with (United States) John Cook) | (United States) Ben Crenshaw and (United States) Phil Mickelson | Won with par on second extra hole |
| 3 | 2000 | Fred Meyer Challenge (with (United States) John Cook) | (South Africa) David Frost and (United States) Jim Furyk | Won with birdie on first extra hole |

=== PGA Tour Champions wins (3) ===
Legend
PGA Tour Champions major championships (1)
Other Champions Tour (2)

| No. | Date | Tournament | Winning score | To par | Margin of victory | Runner(s)-up |
|---|---|---|---|---|---|---|
| 1 | Apr 25, 2010 | Liberty Mutual Insurance Legends of Golf (with (Zimbabwe) Nick Price) | 62-64-62=188 | −28 | Playoff | (United States) John Cook and (United States) Joey Sindelar |
| 2 | Oct 10, 2010 | Constellation Energy Senior Players Championship | 68-68-69-68=273 | −7 | Playoff | (United States) Michael Allen |
| 3 | Mar 3, 2019 | Cologuard Classic | 66-70-66=202 | −17 | 4 strokes | (Northern Ireland) Darren Clarke, (United States) Scott McCarron, (United States) Kirk Triplett, (United States) Willie Wood |

PGA Tour Champions playoff record (2–2)

| No. | Year | Tournament | Opponent(s) | Result |
|---|---|---|---|---|
| 1 | 2010 | Liberty Mutual Insurance Legends of Golf (with (Zimbabwe) Nick Price) | (United States) John Cook and (United States) Joey Sindelar | Won with par on second extra hole |
| 2 | 2010 | Constellation Energy Senior Players Championship | (United States) Michael Allen | Won with par on first extra hole |
| 3 | 2011 | Songdo IBD Championship | (United States) Jay Don Blake, (United States) John Cook, (Australia) Peter Senior | Blake won with birdie on fifth extra hole O'Meara and Senior eliminated by par on third hole |
| 4 | 2012 | Boeing Classic | (United States) Jay Don Blake | Lost to birdie on second extra hole |

== Major championships ==
=== Wins (2) ===
| Year | Championship | 54 holes | Winning score | To par | Margin | Runner(s)-up |
|---|---|---|---|---|---|---|
| 1998 | Masters Tournament | 2 shot deficit | 74-70-68-67=279 | −9 | 1 stroke | (United States) Fred Couples, (United States) David Duval |
| 1998 | The Open Championship | 2 shot deficit | 72-68-72-68=280 | E | Playoff^{1} | (United States) Brian Watts |

^{1}Defeated Brian Watts in 4-hole playoff: O'Meara (4-4-5-4=17), Watts (5-4-5-5=19)

=== Results timeline ===
| Tournament | 1980 | 1981 | 1982 | 1983 | 1984 | 1985 | 1986 | 1987 | 1988 | 1989 |
|---|---|---|---|---|---|---|---|---|---|---|
| Masters Tournament | CUT | | | | | 24 | 48 | T24 | T39 | T11 |
| U.S. Open | CUT | CUT | 58 | | T7 | T15 | T41 | CUT | T3 | CUT |
| The Open Championship | | T47 | | | | T3 | T43 | T66 | 27 | T42 |
| PGA Championship | | T70 | | CUT | T25 | T28 | CUT | CUT | T9 | CUT |

| Tournament | 1990 | 1991 | 1992 | 1993 | 1994 | 1995 | 1996 | 1997 | 1998 | 1999 |
|---|---|---|---|---|---|---|---|---|---|---|
| Masters Tournament | CUT | T27 | T4 | T21 | T15 | T31 | T18 | T30 | 1 | T31 |
| U.S. Open | CUT | CUT | CUT | CUT | CUT | | T16 | T36 | T32 | CUT |
| The Open Championship | T48 | T3 | T12 | CUT | | T49 | T33 | T38 | 1 | CUT |
| PGA Championship | T19 | CUT | CUT | CUT | | T6 | T26 | T13 | T4 | T57 |

| Tournament | 2000 | 2001 | 2002 | 2003 | 2004 | 2005 | 2006 | 2007 | 2008 | 2009 |
|---|---|---|---|---|---|---|---|---|---|---|
| Masters Tournament | CUT | T20 | CUT | T8 | T27 | T31 | CUT | CUT | CUT | CUT |
| U.S. Open | T51 | CUT | T18 | T35 | | | | | CUT | |
| The Open Championship | T26 | T42 | T22 | T65 | T30 | CUT | T63 | T60 | CUT | T70 |
| PGA Championship | T46 | T22 | CUT | CUT | CUT | | | | | |

| Tournament | 2010 | 2011 | 2012 | 2013 | 2014 | 2015 | 2016 | 2017 | 2018 |
|---|---|---|---|---|---|---|---|---|---|
| Masters Tournament | CUT | CUT | | CUT | CUT | T22 | CUT | CUT | CUT |
| U.S. Open | | | | | | | | | |
| The Open Championship | CUT | CUT | | T58 | | T78 | T63 | CUT | |
| PGA Championship | | | | | | | | | |

Win
Top 10
Did not play

CUT = missed the halfway cut
"T" indicates a tie for a place.

=== Summary ===
| Tournament | Wins | 2nd | 3rd | Top-5 | Top-10 | Top-25 | Events | Cuts made |
|---|---|---|---|---|---|---|---|---|
| Masters Tournament | 1 | 0 | 0 | 2 | 3 | 11 | 34 | 19 |
| U.S. Open | 0 | 0 | 1 | 1 | 2 | 5 | 23 | 11 |
| The Open Championship | 1 | 0 | 2 | 3 | 3 | 5 | 31 | 24 |
| PGA Championship | 0 | 0 | 0 | 1 | 3 | 7 | 22 | 12 |
| Totals | 2 | 0 | 3 | 7 | 11 | 28 | 110 | 66 |

- Most consecutive cuts made – 11 (1995 Masters – 1999 Masters)
- Longest streak of top-10s – 2 (1998 Open Championship – 1998 PGA)

== Results in The Players Championship ==
| Tournament | 1981 | 1982 | 1983 | 1984 | 1985 | 1986 | 1987 | 1988 | 1989 |
|---|---|---|---|---|---|---|---|---|---|
| The Players Championship | T26 | T77 | T49 | T5 | T17 | T33 | 3 | CUT | CUT |

| Tournament | 1990 | 1991 | 1992 | 1993 | 1994 | 1995 | 1996 | 1997 | 1998 | 1999 |
|---|---|---|---|---|---|---|---|---|---|---|
| The Players Championship | WD | CUT | T9 | 5 | CUT | CUT | T29 | T70 | T42 | T6 |

| Tournament | 2000 | 2001 | 2002 | 2003 | 2004 | 2005 | 2006 | 2007 | 2008 | 2009 |
|---|---|---|---|---|---|---|---|---|---|---|
| The Players Championship | T9 | CUT | CUT | CUT | | | | | | |

| Tournament | 2010 | 2011 |
|---|---|---|
| The Players Championship | | 74 |

Top 10
Did not play

CUT = missed the halfway cut
WD = withdrew
"T" indicates a tie for a place

== Results in World Golf Championships ==
| Tournament | 1999 | 2000 | 2001 | 2002 | 2003 | 2004 |
|---|---|---|---|---|---|---|
| Match Play | R64 | R32 | | | | |
| Championship | | | NT^{1} | | | |
| Invitational | T25 | T27 | | | | T72 |

^{1}Cancelled due to 9/11

Did not play

QF, R16, R32, R64 = Round in which player lost in match play
"T" = Tied
WD = Withdrew
NT = No tournament

== Senior major championships ==
=== Wins (1) ===
| Year | Championship | Winning score | To par | Margin | Runner-up |
|---|---|---|---|---|---|
| 2010 | Constellation Energy Senior Players Championship | 68-68-69-68=273 | −7 | Playoff | (United States) Michael Allen |

=== Results timeline ===
Results not in chronological order before 2022.

| Tournament | 2007 | 2008 | 2009 | 2010 | 2011 | 2012 | 2013 | 2014 | 2015 | 2016 | 2017 | 2018 | 2019 | 2020 | 2021 | 2022 | 2023 |
|---|---|---|---|---|---|---|---|---|---|---|---|---|---|---|---|---|---|
| The Tradition | T14 | T31 | T11 | T38 | T12 | | T36 | T35 | T38 | T17 | T40 | T13 | | NT | 72 | T54 | |
| Senior PGA Championship | T12 | T24 | T14 | 4 | T18 | | 4 | | T45 | T14 | T46 | T38 | | NT | T57 | | |
| U.S. Senior Open | T11 | CUT | T6 | CUT | 2 | | 19 | T38 | WD | CUT | CUT | CUT | T38 | NT | T52 | T41 | T51 |
| Senior Players Championship | T31 | T32 | T9 | 1 | 5 | | T39 | T6 | WD | T36 | 70 | T72 | WD | 66 | | | |
| Senior British Open Championship | T2 | T34 | T25 | | T39 | | T26 | | WD | T18 | | | | NT | | | |

Win
Top 10
Did not play

CUT = missed the halfway cut
WD = withdrew
"T" indicates a tie for a place
NT = No tournament due to COVID-19 pandemic

== U.S. national team appearances ==
Professional

- Alfred Dunhill Cup: 1985, 1986, 1987, 1996 (winners), 1997, 1998, 1999
- Ryder Cup: 1985, 1989 (tie), 1991 (winners), 1997, 1999 (winners)
- Nissan Cup: 1985 (winners)
- Presidents Cup: 1996 (winners), 1998
- World Cup: 1999 (winners)
- UBS Cup: 2001 (winners), 2002 (winners), 2003 (tie)

== See also ==
- Fall 1980 PGA Tour Qualifying School graduates
- List of golfers with most wins in one PGA Tour event
