= 2011 Champions Tour =

Golf tour season

2011 Champions Tour season
- Duration: January 21, 2011 – November 6, 2011
- Number of official events: 24
- Most wins: (United States) John Cook (3) (United States) Tom Lehman (3)
- Charles Schwab Cup: (United States) Tom Lehman
- Money list: (United States) Tom Lehman
- Player of the Year: (United States) Tom Lehman
- Rookie of the Year: (United States) Kenny Perry

The 2011 Champions Tour was the 32nd season of the Champions Tour (formerly the Senior PGA Tour), the main professional golf tour in the United States for men aged 50 and over.

== Schedule ==
The following table lists official events during the 2011 season.

| Date | Tournament | Location | Purse (US$) | Winner (Note: The number in parentheses after each winner's name is the number of Champions Tour events they had won up to and including that tournament. This information is only shown for Champions Tour members.) | Notes |
|---|---|---|---|---|---|
| Jan 23 | Mitsubishi Electric Championship at Hualalai | Hawaii | 1,800,000 | (United States) John Cook (6) | |
| Feb 13 | Allianz Championship | Florida | 1,800,000 | (United States) Tom Lehman (3) | |
| Feb 20 | ACE Group Classic | Florida | 1,600,000 | (Germany) Bernhard Langer (14) | |
| Mar 13 | Toshiba Classic | California | 1,700,000 | (Zimbabwe) Nick Price (4) | |
| Apr 3 | Mississippi Gulf Resort Classic | Mississippi | 1,600,000 | (United States) Tom Lehman (4) | |
| Apr 17 | Outback Steakhouse Pro-Am | Florida | 1,700,000 | (United States) John Cook (7) | Pro-Am |
| Apr 24 | Liberty Mutual Legends of Golf | Georgia | 2,700,000 | (United States) David Eger (4) and (Republic of Ireland) Mark McNulty (8) | Team event |
| May 8 | Regions Tradition | Alabama | 2,200,000 | (United States) Tom Lehman (5) | Champions Tour major championship |
| May 29 | Senior PGA Championship | Kentucky | 2,000,000 | (United States) Tom Watson (14) | Senior major championship |
| Jun 5 | Principal Charity Classic | Iowa | 1,725,000 | (United States) Bob Gilder (10) | |
| Jun 12 | Greater Hickory Classic at Rock Barn | North Carolina | 1,750,000 | (United States) Mark Wiebe (3) | |
| Jun 26 | Dick's Sporting Goods Open | New York | 1,750,000 | (United States) John Huston (1) | |
| Jul 3 | Montreal Championship | Canada | 1,800,000 | (United States) John Cook (8) | |
| Jul 10 | Nature Valley First Tee Open at Pebble Beach | California | 1,600,000 | (United States) Jeff Sluman (4) | |
| Jul 24 | The Senior Open Championship | England | 2,000,000 | (United States) Russ Cochran (3) | Senior major championship |
| Jul 31 | U.S. Senior Open | Ohio | 2,600,000 | (United States) Olin Browne (1) | Senior major championship |
| Aug 7 | 3M Championship | Minnesota | 1,750,000 | (United States) Jay Haas (15) | |
| Aug 21 | Constellation Energy Senior Players Championship | New York | 2,700,000 | (United States) Fred Couples (5) | Champions Tour major championship |
| Aug 28 | Boeing Classic | Washington | 2,000,000 | (United States) Mark Calcavecchia (1) | |
| Sep 18 | Songdo IBD Championship | South Korea | 3,000,000 | (United States) Jay Don Blake (1) | |
| Oct 2 | SAS Championship | North Carolina | 2,100,000 | (United States) Kenny Perry (1) | |
| Oct 9 | Insperity Championship | Texas | 1,700,000 | (United States) Brad Faxon (1) | |
| Oct 16 | AT&T Championship | Texas | 1,800,000 | (United States) Fred Couples (6) | |
| Nov 6 | Charles Schwab Cup Championship | California | 2,500,000 | (United States) Jay Don Blake (2) | Tour Championship |

== Charles Schwab Cup ==
The Charles Schwab Cup was based on tournament results during the season, calculated using a points-based system.

| Position | Player | Points |
|---|---|---|
| 1 | (United States) Tom Lehman | 2,422 |
| 2 | (United States) Mark Calcavecchia | 2,348 |
| 3 | (Australia) Peter Senior | 1,874 |
| 4 | (United States) Jay Don Blake | 1,803 |
| 5 | (United States) John Cook | 1,798 |

== Money list ==
The money list was based on prize money won during the season, calculated in U.S. dollars.

| Position | Player | Prize money ($) |
|---|---|---|
| 1 | (United States) Tom Lehman | 2,081,526 |
| 2 | (United States) Mark Calcavecchia | 1,867,991 |
| 3 | (United States) John Cook | 1,747,075 |
| 4 | (United States) Jay Don Blake | 1,531,877 |
| 5 | (United States) Russ Cochran | 1,503,090 |

== Awards ==
| Award | Winner | Ref. |
|---|---|---|
| Player of the Year (Jack Nicklaus Trophy) | (United States) Tom Lehman | |
| Rookie of the Year | (United States) Kenny Perry | |
| Scoring leader (Byron Nelson Award) | (United States) Mark Calcavecchia | |
| Comeback Player of the Year | (United States) Chip Beck | |
