= Sony Championship Hawaii =

Golf tournament in Hawaii, United States

Coordinates: 21.272°N 157.775°W

Tournament information
- Location: Honolulu, Hawaii, U.S.
- Established: 1965
- Course: Waialae Country Club
- Par: 70
- Length: 7,044 yards (6,441 m)
- Organized by: Friends of Hawaii Charities
- Tours: PGA Tour Champions (2027−present); PGA Tour (1965−2026)
- Format: Stroke play
- Prize fund: US$3,000,000
- Month played: January

Tournament record score
- Aggregate: 253 (Note: PGA Tour aggregate scoring record.) Justin Thomas (2017)
- To par: −28 John Huston (1998)

Current champion
- (United States) Chris Gotterup

Final champion
- Location in Hawaii

The Sony Championship Hawaii (formerly known as the Hawaiian Open and the Sony Open in Hawaii) is a professional golf tournament that is an event on the PGA Tour Champions. It is contested on the second week of January at the Waialae Country Club in Honolulu, Hawaii. The tournament was formerly an event on the main PGA Tour from its inception in 1965 to 2026.

== History ==
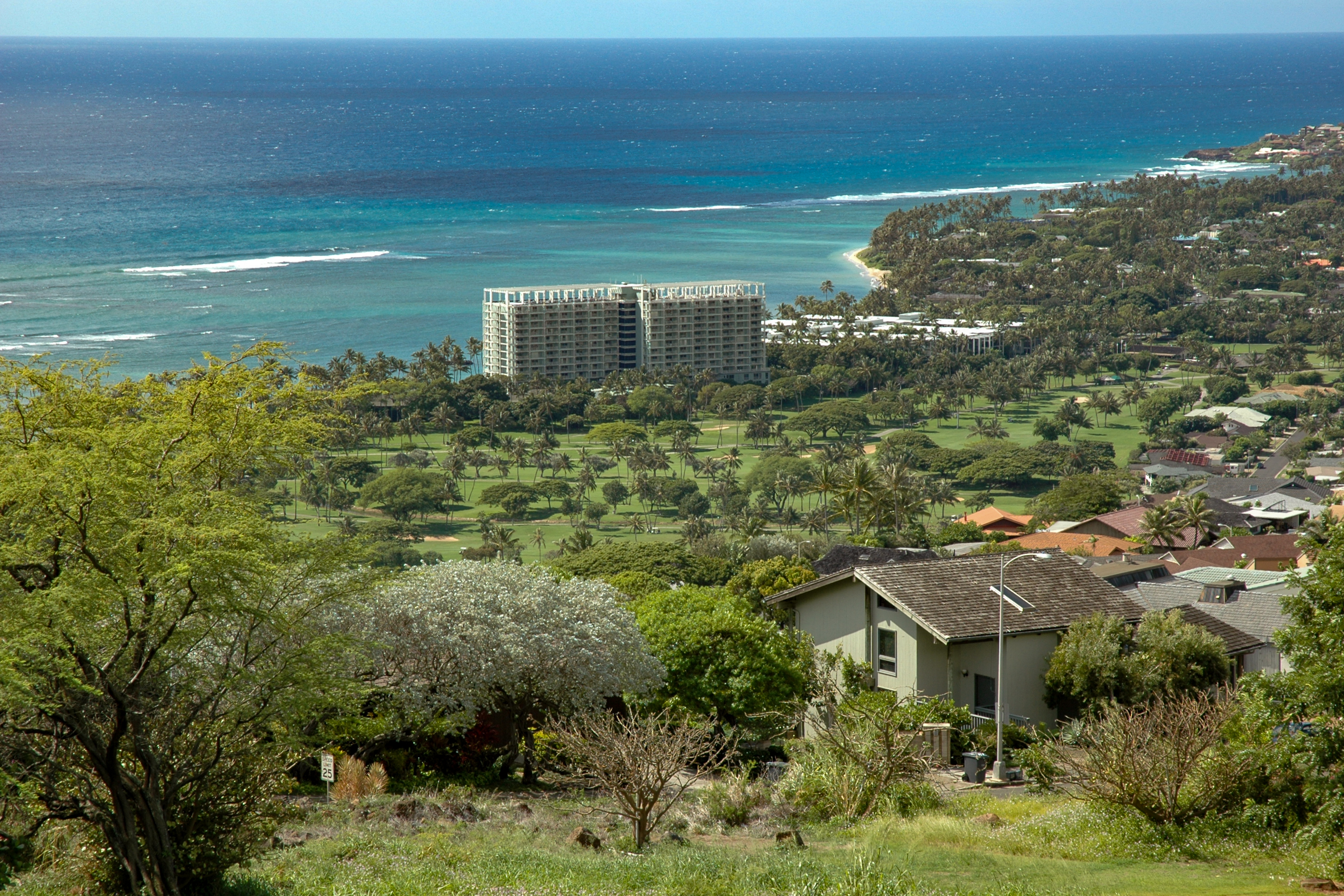
Setting for the Sony Open: the Waialae Country Club on Oahu

Originally a mid-autumn event for its first five editions, it was skipped in 1970 as it moved to its winter slot in early February 1971. Currently, it is held in mid-January and is the first full-field event of the calendar year, following the Tournament of Champions on Maui. The front and back nines of Waialae are switched for the PGA Tour event, finishing at the dogleg ninth hole.

The first lead sponsor was United Airlines in 1991, succeeded by current sponsor Sony in 1999. There have been five multiple winners of the tournament, all two-time champions: Hubert Green, Corey Pavin, Lanny Wadkins, Ernie Els, and Jimmy Walker. All have won major championships. The tournament is currently organized by Friends of Hawaii Charities.

In 1983, forty-year-old Isao Aoki became Japan's first winner on the PGA Tour. He holed out a wedge shot for an eagle-3 on the 72nd hole to beat Jack Renner by a stroke.

In 1998, John Huston broke the then PGA Tour scoring record to par. He shot 28 under par, beating Ben Hogan's record originally set in 1945.

The Sony Open gained attention for granting four consecutive sponsor invitations (PGA Tour Exemption #11) to Michelle Wie, the first in 2004 when she was age 14. She missed the cut in all four appearances, and did not receive one of the four available sponsor exemptions in 2008. One of the invitations went to Alex Ching, a 17-year-old former high school classmate of Wie.

In 2007, amateur Tadd Fujikawa become the second youngest player ever (16 years, 4 days) to make a 36-hole cut in an official PGA Tour event. His achievement was highlighted by a 15-foot (4.6 m) eagle putt on his 36th hole, Waialae's 551-yard par-5 18th. Incidentally, the PGA Tour's 2006 media guide shows that the youngest player ever to make a 36-hole cut in an official Tour event was Bob Panasik (15 years, 8 months, and 20 days) in 1957 at the Canadian Open, 3 1/2 months younger than Fujikawa.

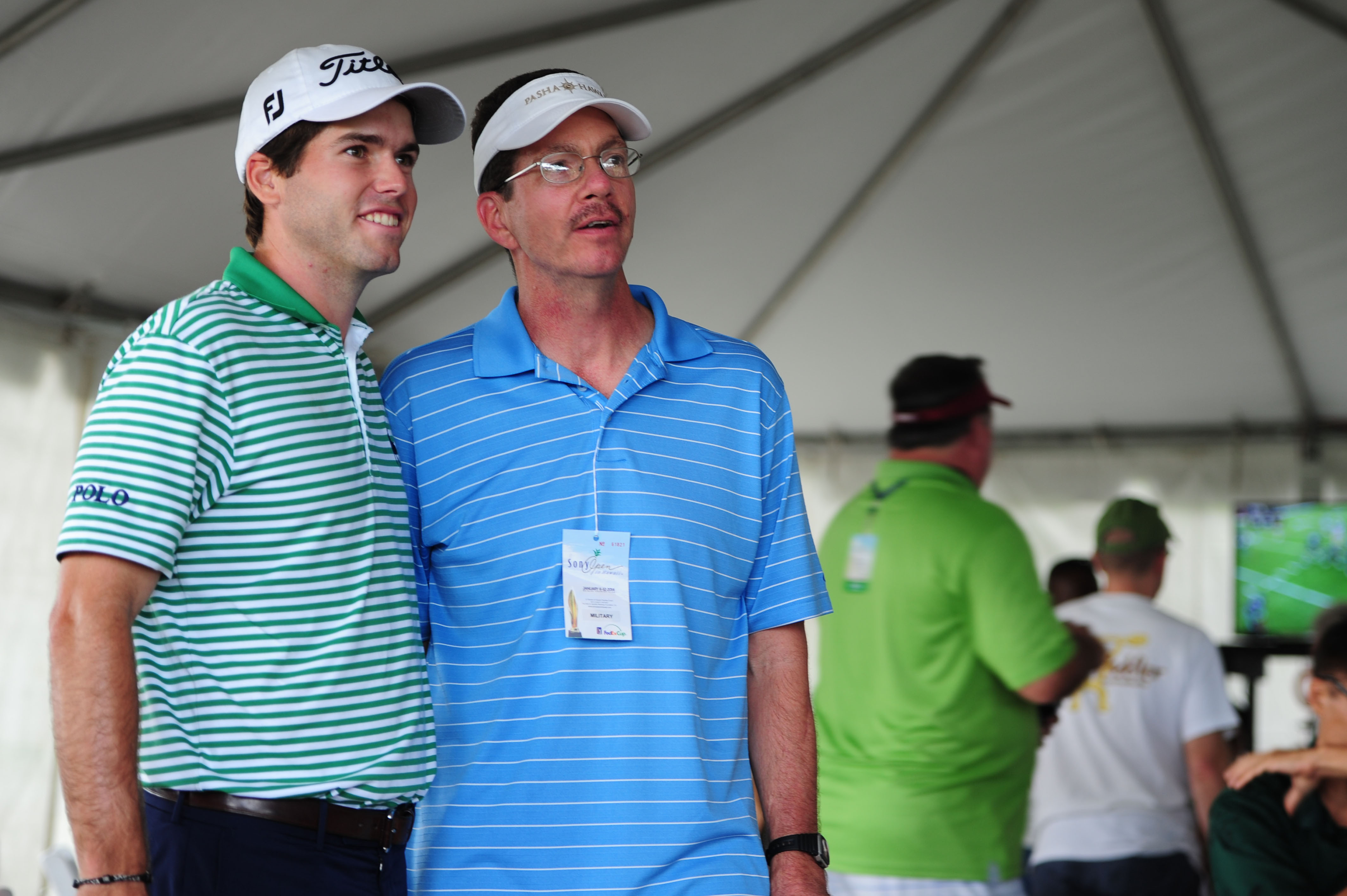
PGA Tour golfer Ben Martin (left) at a Birdies for the Brave event following his round at the 2014 Sony Open

Preparations for the 2018 Sony Open were briefly disrupted by a false emergency alert stating that a ballistic missile had been launched toward Hawaii. Staff members reportedly attempted to take shelter in the players' locker room, the media center was ordered to evacuate, and several players posted messages on social media about the erroneous alert, which was sent to all smartphones in the state. The alert was ultimately determined to have been sent in error. Before the final round, Golf Channel cameramen also staged a walkout.

On April 20, 2026, the PGA Tour announced that the tournament, along with The Sentry in neighboring Maui, would no longer be events on the season schedule. On July 1, 2026, the PGA Tour announced that the tournament would move to the PGA Tour Champions senior circuit, where it would be renamed to the "Sony Championship Hawaii" and feature a $3 million purse.

== Winners ==
Year	Winner	Score	To par	Margin of victory	Runner(s)-up	Purse ($)	Winner's share ($)	Ref.
Sony Championship Hawaii (PGA Tour Champions)
2027								
Sony Open in Hawaii (PGA Tour)
2026	(United States) Chris Gotterup	264	−16	2 strokes	(United States) Ryan Gerard	9,100,000	1,638,000	
2025	(Canada) Nick Taylor	264	−16	Playoff	(Colombia) Nico Echavarría	8,700,000	1,566,000	
2024	(United States) Grayson Murray	263	−17	Playoff	(South Korea) An Byeong-hun (United States) Keegan Bradley	8,300,000	1,494,000	
2023	(South Korea) Kim Si-woo	262	−18	1 stroke	(United States) Hayden Buckley	7,900,000	1,422,000	
2022	(Japan) Hideki Matsuyama	257	−23	Playoff	(United States) Russell Henley	7,500,000	1,350,000	
2021	(United States) Kevin Na	259	−21	1 stroke	(United States) Chris Kirk (Chile) Joaquín Niemann	6,600,000	1,188,000	
2020	(Australia) Cameron Smith	269	−11	Playoff	(United States) Brendan Steele	6,600,000	1,188,000	
2019	(United States) Matt Kuchar	258	−22	4 strokes	(United States) Andrew Putnam	6,400,000	1,152,000	
2018	(United States) Patton Kizzire	263	−17	Playoff	(United States) James Hahn	6,200,000	1,116,000	
2017	(United States) Justin Thomas	253	−27	7 strokes	(England) Justin Rose	6,000,000	1,080,000	
2016	(Argentina) Fabián Gómez	260	−20	Playoff	(United States) Brandt Snedeker	5,800,000	1,044,000	
2015	(United States) Jimmy Walker (2)	257	−23	9 strokes	(United States) Scott Piercy	5,600,000	1,008,000	
2014	(United States) Jimmy Walker	263	−17	1 stroke	(United States) Chris Kirk	5,600,000	1,008,000	
2013	(United States) Russell Henley	256	−24	3 strokes	(South Africa) Tim Clark	5,600,000	1,008,000	
2012	(United States) Johnson Wagner	267	−13	2 strokes	(United States) Harrison Frazar (United States) Charles Howell III (United States) Sean O'Hair (Sweden) Carl Pettersson	5,500,000	990,000	
2011	(United States) Mark Wilson	264	−16	2 strokes	(South Africa) Tim Clark (United States) Steve Marino	5,500,000	990,000	
2010	(United States) Ryan Palmer	265	−15	1 stroke	(Australia) Robert Allenby	5,500,000	990,000	
2009	(United States) Zach Johnson	265	−15	2 strokes	(Australia) Adam Scott (United States) David Toms	5,400,000	972,000	
2008	(South Korea) K. J. Choi	266	−14	3 strokes	(South Africa) Rory Sabbatini	5,300,000	954,000	
2007	(United States) Paul Goydos	266	−14	1 stroke	(England) Luke Donald (United States) Charles Howell III	5,200,000	936,000	
2006	(United States) David Toms	261	−19	5 strokes	(United States) Chad Campbell (South Africa) Rory Sabbatini	5,100,000	918,000	
2005	(Fiji) Vijay Singh	269	−11	1 stroke	(South Africa) Ernie Els	4,800,000	864,000	
2004	(South Africa) Ernie Els (2)	262	−18	Playoff	(United States) Harrison Frazar	4,800,000	864,000	
2003	(South Africa) Ernie Els	264	−16	Playoff	(Australia) Aaron Baddeley	4,500,000	810,000	
2002	(United States) Jerry Kelly	266	−14	1 stroke	(United States) John Cook	4,000,000	720,000	
2001	(United States) Brad Faxon	260	−20	4 strokes	(United States) Tom Lehman	4,000,000	720,000	
2000	(United States) Paul Azinger	261	−19	7 strokes	(Australia) Stuart Appleby	2,900,000	522,000	
1999	(United States) Jeff Sluman	271	−9	2 strokes	(United States) Davis Love III (United States) Jeff Maggert (United States) Len Mattiace (United States) Chris Perry (United States) Tommy Tolles	2,600,000	468,000	
United Airlines Hawaiian Open (PGA Tour)
1998	(United States) John Huston	260	−28	7 strokes	(United States) Tom Watson	1,800,000	324,000	
1997	(United States) Paul Stankowski	271	−17	Playoff	(United States) Jim Furyk (United States) Mike Reid	1,200,000	216,000	
1996	(United States) Jim Furyk	277	−11	Playoff	(United States) Brad Faxon	1,200,000	216,000	
1995	(United States) John Morse	269	−19	3 strokes	(United States) Tom Lehman (United States) Duffy Waldorf	1,200,000	216,000	
1994	(Australia) Brett Ogle	269	−19	1 stroke	(United States) Davis Love III	1,200,000	216,000	
1993	(United States) Howard Twitty	269	−19	4 strokes	(United States) Joey Sindelar	1,200,000	216,000	
1992	(United States) John Cook	265	−23	2 strokes	(United States) Paul Azinger	1,200,000	216,000	
United Hawaiian Open (PGA Tour)
1991	(United States) Lanny Wadkins (2)	270	−18	4 strokes	(United States) John Cook	1,100,000	198,000	
Hawaiian Open (PGA Tour)
1990	(United States) David Ishii	279	−9	1 stroke	(United States) Paul Azinger	1,000,000	180,000	
1989	(United States) Gene Sauers	197 (Note: Shortened to 54 holes due to rain.)	−19	1 stroke	(United States) David Ogrin	750,000	135,000	
1988	(United States) Lanny Wadkins	271	−17	1 stroke	(Canada) Richard Zokol	600,000	108,000	
1987	(United States) Corey Pavin (2)	270	−18	Playoff	(United States) Craig Stadler	600,000	108,000	
1986	(United States) Corey Pavin	272	−16	2 strokes	(United States) Paul Azinger	500,000	90,000	
1985	(United States) Mark O'Meara	267	−21	1 stroke	(United States) Craig Stadler	500,000	90,000	
1984	(United States) Jack Renner	271	−17	Playoff	(United States) Wayne Levi	500,000	90,000	
1983	(Japan) Isao Aoki	268	−20	1 stroke	(United States) Jack Renner	325,000	58,500	
1982	(United States) Wayne Levi	277	−11	1 stroke	(United States) Scott Simpson	325,000	58,500	
1981	(United States) Hale Irwin	265	−23	6 strokes	(United States) Don January	325,000	58,500	
1980	(United States) Andy Bean	266	−22	3 strokes	(United States) Lee Trevino	325,000	58,500	
1979	(United States) Hubert Green (2)	267	−21	3 strokes	(United States) Fuzzy Zoeller	300,000	54,000	
1978	(United States) Hubert Green	274	−14	Playoff	(United States) Billy Kratzert	250,000	50,000	
1977	(United States) Bruce Lietzke	273	−15	3 strokes	(United States) Don January (Japan) Takashi Murakami	240,000	48,000	
1976	(United States) Ben Crenshaw	270	−18	4 strokes	(United States) Hale Irwin (United States) Larry Nelson	230,000	46,000	
1975	(United States) Gary Groh	274	−14	1 stroke	(United States) Al Geiberger	220,000	44,000	
1974	(United States) Jack Nicklaus	271	−17	3 strokes	(United States) Eddie Pearce	220,000	44,000	
1973	(United States) John Schlee	273	−15	2 strokes	(United States) Orville Moody	200,000	40,000	
1972	(United States) Grier Jones	274	−14	Playoff	(United States) Bob Murphy	200,000	40,000	
1971	(United States) Tom Shaw	273	−15	1 stroke	(United States) Miller Barber	200,000	40,000	
1970: No tournament
1969	(Australia) Bruce Crampton	274	−14	4 strokes	(United States) Jack Nicklaus	125,000	25,000	
1968	(United States) Lee Trevino	272	−16	2 strokes	(United States) George Archer	125,000	25,000	
1967	(United States) Dudley Wysong	284	−4	Playoff	(United States) Billy Casper	100,000	20,000	
1966	(United States) Ted Makalena	271	−17	3 strokes	(United States) Billy Casper (United States) Gay Brewer	42,500	8,500	
1965	(United States) Gay Brewer	281	−7	Playoff	(United States) Bob Goalby	45,000	9,000	

Note: Green highlight indicates scoring records.

Previous incarnations recognized by PGA Tour

Year	Player	Score	To par	Winner's share ($)
1948	(United States) Cary Middlecoff	274	−10	2,000
1947	(United States) Dutch Harrison	275	−13	2,000
1929	(United States) Craig Wood	289	+1	1,600
1928	(United States) Bill Mehlhorn	291		

== Records ==
- Tournament record: 253 (Justin Thomas, 2017)
- 54-hole record: 188 (Justin Thomas, 2017)
- 36-hole record: 123 (Justin Thomas, 2017)
- 18-hole record: 59 (Justin Thomas, 2017)
