= Russ Cochran =

American professional golfer (born 1958)

Personal information
- Full name: Russell Earl Cochran
- Nationality: United States
- Born: October 31, 1958 (age 68) Paducah, Kentucky, U.S.
- Height: 6 ft 0 in (1.83 m)
- Weight: 190 lb (86 kg; 14 st)

Career
- Sport: Golf
- College: University of Kentucky
- Turned professional: 1979
- Current tour: PGA Tour Champions
- Former tour: PGA Tour
- Professional wins: 10
- Highest ranking: 64 (June 14, 1992)

Number of wins by tour
- PGA Tour: 1
- PGA Tour Champions: 5
- Other: 4

Best results in major championships
- Masters Tournament: T21: 1993
- PGA Championship: T7: 1992
- U.S. Open: T33: 1992
- The Open Championship: T28: 1992

Achievements and awards
- Champions Tour Rookie of the Year: 2009

Russell Earl Cochran (born October 31, 1958) is an American professional golfer who plays on the PGA Tour Champions, having previously been a member on the PGA Tour and the Nationwide Tour. He is one of the few natural left-handed players to win a PGA Tour event. For much of the 1980s through 1992, he was the only left-hander on the PGA Tour.

== Early life and amateur career ==
Cochran was born, raised and has lived most of his life in Paducah, Kentucky. He grew up playing on Paxton Park Public Golf Course in Paducah, as did fellow PGA Tour player Kenny Perry, who came along a couple years later.

After graduating from St. Mary High School in Paducah, he attended the University of Kentucky and was a member of the golf team.

== Professional career ==
In 1979, Cochran turned pro. He joined the PGA Tour in 1982.

Cochran has about 60 top-10 finishes in official PGA Tour events including a victory at the 1991 Centel Western Open when he made up seven shots over eight holes to beat Greg Norman. His career year was 1991, when in addition to his win at the Western Open, he had two second-place finishes—including a playoff loss to Craig Stadler at the Tour Championship – and a third and finished 10th on the money list. His best finish in a major was a tie for seventh at the 1992 PGA Championship. Cochran set the Valhalla Golf Club course record (65) in the third round of the 1996 PGA Championship which stood until broken (63) in the same tournament four years later by José María Olazábal. He played some on the Nationwide Tour in his mid-to-late 40s in preparation for the Champions Tour. His best Nationwide finish was a tie for third at the 2003 Chitimacha Louisiana Open.

=== Senior career ===
Cochran debuted on the Champions Tour with a tie for seventh at the Allianz Championship on February 15, 2009, at Boca Raton, Florida. He finished third at the U.S. Senior Open on August 2, 2009, at Carmel, Indiana, setting the Crooked Stick Golf Club course record with a third-round score of 8-under par 64. He ended the year by winning the Rookie of the Year award. In 2010, he earned his first victory on the Champions Tour, defeating Fred Funk on the first hole of a sudden-death playoff in the Posco E&C Songdo Championship in South Korea, and followed that up with another win in the tour's next event, the SAS Championship in North Carolina.

Cochran won his maiden senior major championship at the 2011 Senior British Open Championship at Walton Heath. Cochran finished two strokes ahead of the third round leader Mark Calcavecchia. He shot a final round 67 which included six birdies in the first ten holes to open up a five stroke advantage. Despite a late charge by Calcavecchia, Cochran parred the last four holes and held on for a two stroke victory. Afterwards Cochran claimed having his son on the bag was a factor in his success. "It feels great, I had my son (Reed) on the bag, I told him I was going to work hard and come away with something good and I think he was the lucky charm."

In June 2013, Cochran won for the fourth time on the Champions Tour at the Principal Charity Classic. He came from two shots back with a final round 67 to finish a single stroke ahead of Jay Don Blake. This ended a two-year title drought that Cochran had spent battling rib and wrist injuries. In October 2013, he won his second title of the year at the SAS Championship, where he finished with four consecutive birdies to beat David Frost by a single stroke.

== Personal life ==
Cochran and his wife, Jackie, have four children: three sons and a daughter. His oldest son, Ryan, played golf at the University of Florida and aspires to play professionally like his father. Russ's son Case and nephew Rick III are also professional golfers.

== Professional wins (10) ==
=== PGA Tour wins (1) ===
No.	Date	Tournament	Winning score	Margin of victory	Runner-up
1	Jul 7, 1991	Centel Western Open	−13 (66-72-68-69=275)	2 strokes	(Australia) Greg Norman

PGA Tour playoff record (0–1)

No.	Year	Tournament	Opponent	Result
1	1992	The Tour Championship	(United States) Craig Stadler	Lost to birdie on second extra hole

=== Tournament Players Series wins (2) ===
No.	Date	Tournament	Winning score	Margin of victory	Runner-up
1	Apr 10, 1983	Magnolia Classic	−7 (70-70-63=203) (Note: Shortened to 54 holes due to weather.)	2 strokes	(United States) Sammy Rachels
2	Jul 24, 1983	Greater Baltimore Open	−6 (71-70-66-67=274)	1 stroke	(United States) Terry Snodgrass

=== Other wins (2) ===
No.	Date	Tournament	Winning score	Margin of victory	Runner(s)-up
1	Dec 3, 2011	LIME Jamaica Open	−10 (68-70-68=206)	2 strokes	(Canada) Dave Levesque, (United States) Dave Rummells
2	Dec 1, 2012	Half Moon Jamaica Open (2)	−13 (66-71-66=203)	3 strokes	(Canada) Dustin Risdon

Other playoff record (0–1)

No.	Year	Tournament	Opponents	Result
1	1991	Deposit Guaranty Golf Classic	(United States) Mike Nicolette, (United States) Larry Silveira	Silveira won with birdie on first extra hole

=== Champions Tour wins (5) ===
Legend
Senior major championships (1)
Other Champions Tour (4)

No.	Date	Tournament	Winning score	Margin of victory	Runner-up
1	Sep 12, 2010	Posco E&C Songdo Championship	−12 (73-65-66=204)	Playoff	(United States) Fred Funk
2	Sep 26, 2010	SAS Championship	−14 (64-67-71=202)	2 strokes	(United States) Tom Pernice Jr.
3	Jul 24, 2011	The Senior Open Championship	−12 (72-70-67-67=276)	2 strokes	(United States) Mark Calcavecchia
4	Jun 2, 2013	Principal Charity Classic	−11 (71-67-67=205)	1 stroke	(United States) Jay Don Blake
5	Oct 13, 2013	SAS Championship (2)	−17 (66-66-67=199)	1 stroke	(South Africa) David Frost

Champions Tour playoff record (1–1)

No.	Year	Tournament	Opponent	Result
1	2010	Posco E&C Songdo Championship	(United States) Fred Funk	Won with birdie on first extra hole
2	2011	Boeing Classic	(United States) Mark Calcavecchia	Lost to birdie on first extra hole

== Results in major championships ==
Tournament	1984	1985	1986	1987	1988	1989
Masters Tournament						
U.S. Open				T66		
The Open Championship						
PGA Championship	T10	CUT		T28	CUT	CUT

Tournament	1990	1991	1992	1993	1994	1995	1996	1997	1998	1999	2000
Masters Tournament			CUT	T21	T33						
U.S. Open	CUT		T33	CUT				CUT			
The Open Championship			T28								
PGA Championship	CUT	CUT	T7	T44	CUT		T17	T61	T34		CUT

Top 10
Did not play

CUT = missed the half-way cut
"T" = tied

=== Summary ===
Tournament	Wins	2nd	3rd	Top-5	Top-10	Top-25	Events	Cuts made
Masters Tournament	0	0	0	0	0	1	3	2
U.S. Open	0	0	0	0	0	0	5	2
The Open Championship	0	0	0	0	0	0	1	1
PGA Championship	0	0	0	0	2	3	14	7
Totals	0	0	0	0	2	4	23	12

- Most consecutive cuts made – 4 (1992 U.S. Open – 1993 Masters)
- Longest streak of top-10s – 1 (twice)

== Results in The Players Championship ==
Tournament	1984	1985	1986	1987	1988	1989
The Players Championship	T44	CUT	CUT	60	CUT	CUT

Tournament	1990	1991	1992	1993	1994	1995	1996	1997	1998	1999
The Players Championship	CUT	WD	T49	27	T69	CUT		T10	CUT	T71

Tournament	2000	2001
The Players Championship	T61	CUT

Top 10
Did not play

CUT = missed the halfway cut
WD = withdrew
"T" = Tied

== Senior major championships ==
=== Wins (1) ===
Year	Championship	54 holes	Winning score	Margin	Runner-up
2011	The Senior Open Championship	Tied for lead	−12 (72-70-67-67=276)	2 strokes	(United States) Mark Calcavecchia

=== Results timeline ===
Results not in chronological order.

Tournament	2009	2010	2011	2012	2013	2014	2015	2016	2017	2018	2019	2020	2021	2022	2023	2024
The Tradition	T41	T18		T5	T5	WD	T57		T47	T43	T53	NT	65		T59	
Senior PGA Championship	T33	T23		T29	T6	12	T17		CUT	T56		NT	WD			
U.S. Senior Open	3	T28	T17	WD		T14	T15	CUT				NT				
Senior Players Championship	T41	T5	T15	T30	WD	3	T3		T71	70	T60	WD	74			
The Senior Open Championship	T19	T3	1		T14	T10	T31	T66	T31	72	CUT	NT	CUT	T58	CUT	WD

Win
Top 10
Did not play

CUT = missed the half-way cut
WD = withdrew
"T" = tied
NT = No tournament due to COVID-19 pandemic

== See also ==
- 1982 PGA Tour Qualifying School graduates
- 1995 PGA Tour Qualifying School graduates
- 2001 PGA Tour Qualifying School graduates
- 2003 PGA Tour Qualifying School graduates
