= Songdo IBD Championship =

South Korean golf tournament (2010–2011)

Tournament information
- Location: Songdo, Incheon, South Korea
- Established: 2010
- Course: Jack Nicklaus Golf Club Korea
- Par: 72
- Length: 7,087 yards
- Tour: Champions Tour
- Format: Stroke play
- Prize fund: US$3,000,000
- Month played: September
- Final year: 2011

Tournament record score
- Aggregate: 203 Jay Don Blake (2011); 203 John Cook (2011); 203 Mark O'Meara (2011); 203 Peter Senior (2011)
- To par: –13 Jay Don Blake (2011) –13 John Cook (2011) –13 Mark O'Meara (2011) –13 Peter Senior (2011)

Final champion
- (United States) Jay Don Blake

The Songdo IBD Championship was a golf tournament on the Champions Tour. It was played for the first time as the Posco E&C Songdo Championship in September 2010 at the Jack Nicklaus Golf Club Korea in Songdo, South Korea. It was the Champions Tour's first tournament in Asia.

The purse in 2011 was US$3,000,000, with $456,000 going to the winner. This was the largest purse ever for a Champions Tour event.

== Winners ==
Songdo IBD Championship presented by Korean Air

- 2011 (United States) Jay Don Blake^{PO}

Posco E&C Songdo Championship presented by Gale International

- 2010 (United States) Russ Cochran^{PO}

Note: ^{PO} Denotes win in a playoff
