= QBE Shootout =

Team golf event on the PGA Tour

Coordinates: 26.248°N 81.765°W

Tournament information
- Location: Naples, Florida
- Established: 1989
- Courses: Tiburón Golf Club (Gold Course)
- Par: 72
- Length: 7,288 yards (6,664 m)
- Tour: PGA Tour (unofficial event)
- Format: Team stroke play
- Prize fund: US$3,600,000
- Month played: December
- Final year: 2022

Tournament record score
- Aggregate: 179 Harris English and Matt Kuchar (2020)
- To par: −37 as above

Final champion
- (United States) Tom Hoge and (United States) Sahith Theegala
- Location in the United States Location in Florida

The QBE Shootout was a team golf tournament that took place on the PGA Tour as an unofficial money event. It was originally played during the off-season.

The event began in 1989, as the RMCC Invitational. It was hosted by golfer Greg Norman. The tournament was soon renamed the Shark Shootout after Norman's nickname, and has had several names since (see Winners below). The first eleven editions of the tournament were played at Sherwood Country Club in Thousand Oaks, California (1989–99). It was then played for one year at Doral Resort & Spa, on the Norman designed Great White Course, before moving to Tiburón Golf Club in Naples, Florida in 2001, where it was played over the Norman designed Gold Course.

In 2023, the PGA Tour replaced the QBE Shootout with the Grant Thornton Invitational, a 16-team event which features one male and one female pro golfer on each team.

== Format ==
The Shootout was a 3-day, 54-hole stroke play event in which teams of two compete. The format since 2014 has been:

- First round: scramble, also known as ambrose or best-shot. Both players tee off on each hole; having decided which result is better, both play their next stroke from within a club-length of that position, but no closer to the hole. This procedure is repeated until the hole is finished.
- Second round: greensomes, also known as modified alternate shot or Scotch foursomes. Both players tee off on each hole and the ball finishing in the better position is chosen; alternate strokes are then played to complete the hole, with the player who did not play the chosen ball from the tee taking the next stroke.
- Final round: better ball, also known as best ball. Each golfer plays their own ball throughout, with the lower score being counted on each hole.

== Broadcasting history ==
The event was originally broadcast in the United States by the USA Network and CBS, with USA broadcasting the first round on a tape-delayed basis, and CBS handling the second round live – it was then a two-round tournament. Not all the country saw the final round live, as CBS's commitment to the NFL only allowed part of the country to see the round as it took place, with the rest of the U.S. seeing the event beginning at 4 p.m. Eastern Time.

In 2007, the event was moved to December, and was broadcast live by both Golf Channel and NBC. It remained on these networks through 2013. In 2014, weekend coverage moved to Fox, where Norman had become an analyst. The telecast served as a prelude to Fox's coverage of the 2015 U.S. Open. In 2017, weekend coverage returned to NBC.

== Winners ==
Year	Winners	Score	To par	Margin of victory	Runners-up
QBE Shootout
2022	(United States) Tom Hoge and (United States) Sahith Theegala	182	−34	1 stroke	(United States) Charley Hoffman and (United States) Ryan Palmer
2021	(United States) Jason Kokrak and (United States) Kevin Na	183	−33	1 stroke	(United States) Sam Burns and (United States) Billy Horschel
2020	(United States) Harris English (3) and (United States) Matt Kuchar (3)	179	−37	9 strokes	(Slovakia) Rory Sabbatini and (United States) Kevin Tway
2019	(Slovakia) Rory Sabbatini and (United States) Kevin Tway	185	−31	2 strokes	(United States) Jason Kokrak and (United States) J. T. Poston
2018	(United States) Brian Harman and (United States) Patton Kizzire	186	−30	1 stroke	(Argentina) Emiliano Grillo and (Northern Ireland) Graeme McDowell
2017	(United States) Sean O'Hair (2) and (United States) Steve Stricker (2)	190	−26	2 strokes	(Republic of Ireland) Shane Lowry and (Northern Ireland) Graeme McDowell
Franklin Templeton Shootout
2016	(United States) Harris English (2) and (United States) Matt Kuchar (2)	188	−28	1 stroke	(United States) Jerry Kelly and (United States) Steve Stricker
2015	(United States) Jason Dufner and (United States) Brandt Snedeker	186	−30	2 strokes	(United States) Harris English and (United States) Matt Kuchar
2014	(Australia) Jason Day and (United States) Cameron Tringale	184	−32	1 stroke	(United States) Harris English and (United States) Matt Kuchar
2013	(United States) Harris English and (United States) Matt Kuchar	182	−34	7 strokes	(South Africa) Retief Goosen and (Sweden) Freddie Jacobson
2012	(United States) Sean O'Hair and (United States) Kenny Perry (3)	185	−31	1 stroke	(United States) Charles Howell III and (South Africa) Rory Sabbatini
2011	(United States) Keegan Bradley and (United States) Brendan Steele	184	−32	3 strokes	(United States) Mark Calcavecchia and (Zimbabwe) Nick Price (South Africa) Rory Sabbatini and (Venezuela) Jhonattan Vegas
Shark Shootout
2010	(United States) Dustin Johnson and (England) Ian Poulter	186	−30	2 strokes	(Northern Ireland) Darren Clarke and (Northern Ireland) Graeme McDowell
2009	(United States) Jerry Kelly and (United States) Steve Stricker	190	−26	1 stroke	(United States) Chad Campbell and (South Africa) Tim Clark (United States) J. B. Holmes and (United States) Kenny Perry (United States) Justin Leonard and (United States) Scott Verplank
Merrill Lynch Shootout
2008	(United States) Scott Hoch and (United States) Kenny Perry (2)	185	−31	2 strokes	(United States) J. B. Holmes and (United States) Boo Weekley
2007	(United States) Woody Austin and (United States) Mark Calcavecchia (2)	187	−29	1 stroke	(Australia) Greg Norman and (United States) Bubba Watson
2006	(United States) Jerry Kelly and (Australia) Rod Pampling	185	−31	Playoff	(United States) Justin Leonard and (United States) Scott Verplank
Franklin Templeton Shootout
2005	(United States) John Huston and (United States) Kenny Perry	186	−30	1 stroke	(United States) Fred Couples and (Australia) Adam Scott
2004	(United States) Hank Kuehne (2) and (United States) Jeff Sluman (2)	187	−29	2 strokes	(United States) Steve Flesch and (United States) Justin Leonard
2003	(United States) Hank Kuehne and (United States) Jeff Sluman	193	−23	Playoff	(United States) Chad Campbell and (United States) Shaun Micheel (United States) Brad Faxon and (United States) Scott McCarron
2002	(United States) Lee Janzen and (United States) Rocco Mediate	185	−31	1 stroke	(United States) David Gossett and (United States) Matt Kuchar (United States) John Huston and (United States) Jeff Maggert
2001	(United States) Brad Faxon (3) and (United States) Scott McCarron (3)	183	−33	2 strokes	(United States) John Daly and (United States) Frank Lickliter
2000	(United States) Brad Faxon (2) and (United States) Scott McCarron (2)	190	−26	Playoff	(Paraguay) Carlos Franco and (United States) Scott Hoch
Franklin Templeton Shark Shootout
1999	(United States) Fred Couples (3) and (United States) David Duval	184	−32	6 strokes	(United States) Scott Hoch and (United States) Scott McCarron
1998	(Australia) Steve Elkington (3) and (Australia) Greg Norman	189	−27	Playoff	(United States) John Cook and (United States) Peter Jacobsen
1997	(United States) Bruce Lietzke and (United States) Scott McCarron	186	−30	2 strokes	(United States) David Duval and (United States) Scott Hoch
1996	(United States) Jay Haas and (United States) Tom Kite (2)	187	−29	2 strokes	(United States) Hale Irwin and (United States) Lee Janzen (United States) Craig Stadler and (United States) Lanny Wadkins
1995	(United States) Mark Calcavecchia and (Australia) Steve Elkington (2)	184	−32	1 stroke	(United States) Chip Beck and (United States) Lee Janzen
Franklin Funds Shark Shootout
1994	(United States) Fred Couples (2) and (United States) Brad Faxon	190	−26	2 strokes	(United States) Mark O'Meara and (United States) Curtis Strange
1993	(Australia) Steve Elkington and (United States) Raymond Floyd (2)	188	−28	1 stroke	(United States) Mark Calcavecchia and (United States) Brad Faxon (United States) Hale Irwin and (United States) Bruce Lietzke (United States) Tom Kite and (United States) Davis Love III (United States) Mark O'Meara and (United States) Curtis Strange
1992	(United States) Tom Kite and (United States) Davis Love III	191	−25	1 stroke	(United States) Billy Ray Brown and (Zimbabwe) Nick Price (United States) Fred Couples and (United States) Raymond Floyd (United States) Hale Irwin and (United States) Bruce Lietzke
Shark Shootout benefiting RMCC
1991	(United States) Tom Purtzer and (United States) Lanny Wadkins	189	−27	4 strokes	(United States) Jack Nicklaus and (Australia) Greg Norman
RMCC Invitational
1990	(United States) Fred Couples and (United States) Raymond Floyd	182	−34	5 strokes	(United States) Peter Jacobsen and (United States) Arnold Palmer
1989	(United States) Mark O'Meara and (United States) Curtis Strange	190	−26	6 strokes	(West Germany) Bernhard Langer and (United States) John Mahaffey (United States) Lanny Wadkins and (United States) Tom Weiskopf
