= Mark Calcavecchia =

American professional golfer (born 1960)

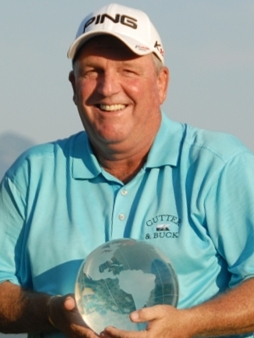
- Calcavecchia, after he won the 2011 Boeing Classic

Personal information
- Full name: Mark John Calcavecchia
- Nickname: Calc
- Nationality: United States
- Born: June 12, 1960 (age 66) Laurel, Nebraska, U.S.
- Height: 6 ft 0 in (1.83 m)
- Weight: 215 lb (98 kg; 15.4 st)

Career
- Sport: Golf
- College: University of Florida
- Turned professional: 1981
- Current tour: PGA Tour Champions
- Former tour: PGA Tour
- Professional wins: 29
- Highest ranking: 5 (July 23, 1989)

Number of wins by tour
- PGA Tour: 13
- European Tour: 1
- PGA Tour of Australasia: 1
- PGA Tour Champions: 4
- Other: 10 (regular); 1 (senior)

Best results in major championships (wins: 1)
- Masters Tournament: 2nd: 1988
- PGA Championship: T4: 2001
- U.S. Open: 14th: 1986
- The Open Championship: Won: 1989

Achievements and awards
- Champions Tour Byron Nelson Award: 2011

Mark John Calcavecchia (born June 12, 1960) is an American professional golfer and a former PGA Tour member. During his professional career, he won 13 PGA Tour events, including the 1989 Open Championship. He plays on the Champions Tour as well as a limited PGA Tour schedule that includes The Open Championship.

== Early life ==
Calcavecchia was born in Laurel, Nebraska. While he was a teenager, his family moved from Nebraska to West Palm Beach, Florida in 1973. He attended North Shore High School in West Palm Beach, and won the Florida high school golf championship in 1977 while playing for the North Shore golf team. While playing in junior tournaments, Calcavecchia often competed against Jack Nicklaus' son, Jackie, and as a result began a lifelong friendship at the age of 14 with the legendary pro.

== Amateur career ==
He accepted an athletic scholarship to the University of Florida in Gainesville, where he played for head coach Buster Bishop and head coach John Darr's Florida Gators men's golf teams in National Collegiate Athletic Association (NCAA) competition from 1978 to 1980. Calcavecchia earned first-team All-Southeastern Conference (SEC) honors in 1979.

== Professional career ==
Calcavecchia turned professional in 1981 and joined the PGA Tour in 1982, but lost his card after the 1985 season. His most notable achievement was in 1989, when he won The Open Championship (the "British Open"), one of the four major championships, by beating Wayne Grady and Greg Norman in a four-hole playoff at Royal Troon in Scotland.

Upon being awarded the Open's Claret Jug, Calcavecchia (whose Italian surname translates as "old crowd") asked "How's my name going to fit on that thing?" He later revealed that he had initially not wanted to play in the Open Championship that year due to his wife expecting their first child, but he was persuaded to fly to Scotland to compete in the tournament by his wife. He also revealed that he didn't know that the Open Championship had a four-hole aggregate playoff format until just before he teed off in the playoff. Calcavecchia shares the record for the lowest back nine in the Masters at 29, in 1992. 1989 was Calcavecchia's only multiple-win season on the PGA Tour, with two other titles complementing the Open. He also finished second behind Sandy Lyle at the 1988 Masters Tournament by a single stroke.

Calcavecchia has won 13 times on the PGA Tour and 13 times in other professional events. He spent 109 weeks in the top 10 of the Official World Golf Rankings from 1988 to 1991. In winning the 2001 Phoenix Open, he set the Tour scoring record at that time by making 32 birdies in 72 holes finishing at 28 under par for the tournament. He has won the Phoenix Open three times (1989, 1992, 2001), and his margins of victory in the Phoenix tournament are also his three largest. He was a member of the U.S. Ryder Cup team in 1987, 1989, 1991 and 2002. His performance in 1991 is most remembered, as he lost a four-hole lead to Colin Montgomerie in the last four holes of his round. Thinking he had cost his team the victory, he broke down in tears—not knowing the U.S. team would still win.

On July 25, 2009, Calcavecchia set a PGA Tour record by getting nine consecutive birdies during his second round at the RBC Canadian Open at the Glen Abbey Golf Course in Oakville, Ontario, Canada. The birdies came on the 12th through 18th holes, and then on the first and second hole (he started his round on the 10th hole). The previous record of eight consecutive birdies was held by six golfers including J. P. Hayes, who was one of his partners at the time Calcavecchia achieved the new record. Calcavecchia joined the Champions Tour in 2010, but still plays a limited PGA Tour schedule that includes The Open Championship. His eligibility for The Open expired in 2020 after he turned 60, but after the COVID-19 pandemic cancelled that tournament, he was grandfathered into the 2021 tournament, but was unable to attend due to surgery. Calcavecchia's exemption was extended to 2022.

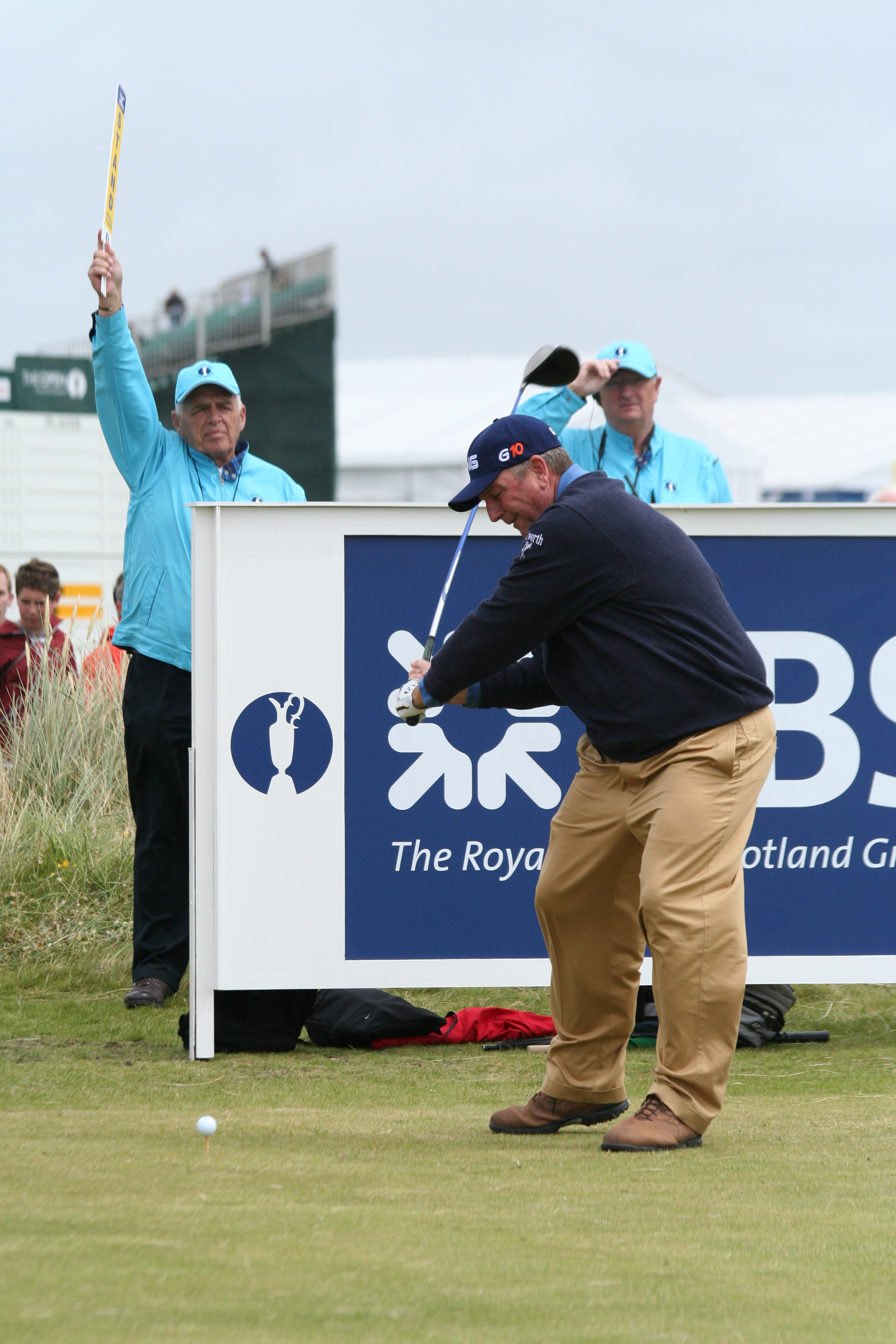
Calcavecchia at 2008 Open Championship

== Personal life ==
Calcavecchia has two children with his ex-wife Sheryl. He married, secondly, on May 5, 2005 in Lake Como, Italy, to Brenda Nardecchia. He has homes in Jupiter, Florida, and Phoenix, Arizona.

On April 8, 2026, while attending the 2026 Masters Tournament, Calcavecchia was removed from Augusta National Golf Club as a result of violating the club's restrictions on cell phone use.

== Professional wins (29) ==
=== PGA Tour wins (13) ===
Legend
Major championships (1)
Other PGA Tour (12)

No.	Date	Tournament	Winning score	Margin of victory	Runner(s)-up
1	Sep 28, 1986	Southwest Golf Classic	−13 (68-70-66-71=275)	3 strokes	(United States) Tom Byrum
2	Mar 8, 1987	Honda Classic	−9 (69-72-68-70=279)	3 strokes	(West Germany) Bernhard Langer, (United States) Payne Stewart
3	Sep 18, 1988	Bank of Boston Classic	−10 (71-67-70-66=274)	1 stroke	(United States) Don Pooley
4	Jan 22, 1989	Phoenix Open	−21 (66-68-65-64=263)	7 strokes	(United States) Chip Beck
5	Feb 5, 1989	Nissan Los Angeles Open	−12 (68-66-70-68=272)	1 stroke	(Scotland) Sandy Lyle
6	Jul 23, 1989	The Open Championship	−13 (71-68-68-68=275)	Playoff	(Australia) Wayne Grady, (Australia) Greg Norman
7	Jan 26, 1992	Phoenix Open (2)	−20 (69-65-67-63=264)	5 strokes	(United States) Duffy Waldorf
8	May 7, 1995	BellSouth Classic	−17 (67-69-69-66=271)	2 strokes	(United States) Jim Gallagher Jr.
9	Aug 24, 1997	Greater Vancouver Open	−19 (68-66-65-66=265)	1 stroke	(United States) Andrew Magee
10	Mar 15, 1998	Honda Classic (2)	−18 (70-67-68-65=270)	3 strokes	(Fiji) Vijay Singh
11	Jan 28, 2001	Phoenix Open (3)	−28 (65-60-64-67=256)	8 strokes	(United States) Rocco Mediate
12	Sep 11, 2005	Bell Canadian Open	−5 (65-67-72-71=275)	1 stroke	(United States) Ben Crane, (United States) Ryan Moore
13	Mar 11, 2007	PODS Championship	−10 (75-67-62-70=274)	1 stroke	(Australia) John Senden, (United States) Heath Slocum

PGA Tour playoff record (1–4)

No.	Year	Tournament	Opponent(s)	Result
1	1987	Byron Nelson Golf Classic	(United States) Fred Couples	Lost to par on third extra hole
2	1989	The Open Championship	(Australia) Wayne Grady, (Australia) Greg Norman	Won four-hole aggregate playoff; Calcavecchia: −2 (4-3-3-3=13), Grady: +1 (4-4-4-4=16), Norman: x (3-3-4-x=x)
3	1990	Doral-Ryder Open	(United States) Paul Azinger, (Australia) Greg Norman, (United States) Tim Simpson	Norman won with eagle on first extra hole
4	1993	Greater Milwaukee Open	(United States) Billy Mayfair, (United States) Ted Schulz	Mayfair won with birdie on fourth extra hole Schulz eliminated by par on first hole
5	2005	Chrysler Classic of Tucson	(United States) Kevin Na, (Australia) Geoff Ogilvy	Ogilvy won with birdie on second extra hole Calcavecchia eliminated by par on first hole

=== PGA Tour of Australia wins (1) ===
No.	Date	Tournament	Winning score	Margin of victory	Runner-up
1	Nov 27, 1988	National Panasonic Australian Open	−19 (67-67-66-69=269)	6 strokes	(United States) Mark McCumber

=== Korean Tour wins (1) ===
No.	Date	Tournament	Winning score	Margin of victory	Runner-up
1	May 9, 2004	Maekyung Open	−6 (69-70-71-72=282)	2 strokes	(South Korea) Jang Ik-jae

=== South American Tour wins (2) ===
- 1993 Argentine Open
- 1995 Argentine Open

=== Other wins (7) ===
No.	Date	Tournament	Winning score	Margin of victory	Runners-up
1	Dec 31, 1989	Spalding Invitational	−10 (69-69-67-71=276)	2 strokes	(Canada) Dave Barr, (United States) Bill Glasson
2	Nov 19, 1995	Franklin Templeton Shootout (with (Australia) Steve Elkington)	−32 (64-61-59=184)	1 stroke	(United States) Chip Beck and (United States) Lee Janzen
3	Nov 9, 1997	Subaru Sarazen World Open	−17 (62-67-71-71=271)	3 strokes	(England) Lee Westwood
4	Dec 12, 1999	Diners Club Matches (with (United States) Fred Couples)	1 up		(Australia) Steve Elkington and (United States) Jeff Maggert
5	Jul 10, 2001	CVS Charity Classic (with (Zimbabwe) Nick Price)	−15 (60-59=119)	Playoff	(United States) Brad Faxon and (South Africa) Gary Player
6	Dec 9, 2001	Hyundai Team Matches (2) (with (United States) Fred Couples)	1 up		(United States) Tom Lehman and (United States) Duffy Waldorf
7	Dec 9, 2007	Merrill Lynch Shootout (2) (with (United States) Woody Austin)	−29 (64-60-63=187)	1 stroke	(Australia) Greg Norman and (United States) Bubba Watson

Other playoff record (1–1)

No.	Year	Tournament	Opponents	Result
1	1991	Fred Meyer Challenge (with (United States) Bob Gilder)	(United States) Paul Azinger and (United States) Ben Crenshaw, (United States) Fred Couples and (United States) Raymond Floyd	Azinger/Crenshaw won with birdie on second extra hole Calcavecchia/Gilder eliminated by par on first hole
2	2001	CVS Charity Classic (with (Zimbabwe) Nick Price)	(United States) Brad Faxon and (South Africa) Gary Player	Won with birdie on first extra hole

=== PGA Tour Champions wins (4) ===
No.	Date	Tournament	Winning score	Margin of victory	Runner(s)-up
1	Aug 28, 2011	Boeing Classic	−14 (70-67-65=202)	Playoff	(United States) Russ Cochran
2	Jun 24, 2012	Montreal Championship	−16 (69-67-64=200)	4 strokes	(United States) Brad Bryant
3	Jun 7, 2015	Principal Charity Classic	−12 (67-68-69=204)	1 stroke	(United States) Joe Durant, (United States) Brian Henninger
4	Feb 11, 2018	Boca Raton Championship	−16 (64-66-70=200)	2 strokes	(Germany) Bernhard Langer

PGA Tour Champions playoff record (1–0)

No.	Year	Tournament	Opponent	Result
1	2011	Boeing Classic	(United States) Russ Cochran	Won with birdie on first extra hole

=== Other senior wins (1) ===
- 2011 Nedbank Champions Challenge

== Major championships ==
=== Wins (1) ===
Year	Championship	54 holes	Winning score	Margin	Runners-up
1989	The Open Championship	3 shot deficit	−13 (71-68-68-68=275)	Playoff^{1}	(Australia) Wayne Grady, (Australia) Greg Norman

^{1}Defeated Grady and Norman in a four-hole aggregate playoff: Calcavecchia (4-3-3-3=13), Grady (4-4-4-4=16), Norman (3-3-4-x)

=== Results timeline ===
Results not in chronological order in 2020.

Tournament	1986	1987	1988	1989
Masters Tournament		T17	2	T31
U.S. Open	14	T17	T62	T61
The Open Championship		T11	CUT	1
PGA Championship		CUT	T17	

Tournament	1990	1991	1992	1993	1994	1995	1996	1997	1998	1999
Masters Tournament	T20	T12	T31	T17	CUT	T41	T15	T17	T16	CUT
U.S. Open	CUT	T37	T33	T25	CUT	CUT	CUT	CUT	CUT	CUT
The Open Championship	CUT	CUT	T28	T14	T11	T24	T41	T10	T35	CUT
PGA Championship	CUT	T32	T48	T31	CUT	CUT	T36	T23	T44	T61

Tournament	2000	2001	2002	2003	2004	2005	2006	2007	2008	2009
Masters Tournament		T4	CUT				CUT	T20	CUT	
U.S. Open		T24	CUT	T20	T20		CUT		WD	
The Open Championship	T26	T54	T80	CUT	T11	T60	T41	T23	CUT	T27
PGA Championship	T34	T4	7	T39	DQ	T70	WD	CUT	T63	

Tournament	2010	2011	2012	2013	2014	2015	2016	2017	2018
Masters Tournament									
U.S. Open									
The Open Championship	73	CUT	T9	CUT		CUT	CUT		CUT
PGA Championship									

Tournament	2019	2020	2021	2022
Masters Tournament				
PGA Championship				
U.S. Open				
The Open Championship		NT		CUT

Win
Top 10
Did not play

DQ = Disqualified
WD = Withdrew
CUT = missed the half-way cut
"T" indicates a tie for a place
NT = No tournament due to the COVID-19 pandemic

=== Summary ===
Tournament	Wins	2nd	3rd	Top-5	Top-10	Top-25	Events	Cuts made
Masters Tournament	0	1	0	2	2	10	18	13
U.S. Open	0	0	0	0	0	6	20	10
The Open Championship	1	0	0	1	3	9	31	19
PGA Championship	0	0	0	1	2	4	21	14
Totals	1	1	0	4	7	29	90	56

- Most consecutive cuts made – 9 (1991 PGA – 1993 PGA)
- Longest streak of top-10s – 1 (seven times)

== Results in The Players Championship ==
Tournament	1987	1988	1989
The Players Championship	T50	T64	CUT

Tournament	1990	1991	1992	1993	1994	1995	1996	1997	1998	1999
The Players Championship	2	73	CUT	T23	T18	T29	T24	4	T10	CUT

Tournament	2000	2001	2002	2003	2004	2005	2006	2007	2008	2009
The Players Championship	CUT	CUT	T69	T11	T66	T12	72	CUT	CUT	

Tournament	2010
The Players Championship	CUT

Top 10
Did not play

CUT = missed the halfway cut
"T" indicates a tie for a place

== Results in World Golf Championships ==
Tournament	1999	2000	2001	2002	2003	2004	2005	2006	2007	2008
Match Play	R64	R16		R16				R64		R64
Championship		10	NT^{1}	T33						T30
Invitational	T12			74				T68		

^{1}Cancelled due to 9/11

Top 10
Did not play

QF, R16, R32, R64 = Round in which player lost in match play
"T" = Tied
NT = No tournament

== Results in senior major championships ==
Results are not in chronological order prior to 2022.

Tournament	2010	2011	2012	2013	2014	2015	2016	2017	2018	2019	2020	2021	2022	2023	2024	2025	2026
Senior PGA Championship		T13	T12	CUT	T15	CUT	CUT		CUT	CUT	NT		CUT		WD		
The Tradition	T4	T5	T18	T12	2	T52	T33	WD	WD	T57	NT						
U.S. Senior Open	T24	3	T12	T54	CUT	CUT	T51	CUT	CUT	CUT	NT		CUT		CUT		WD
Senior Players Championship	WD	12	T4	T9	WD	T20	T76	T41	T32	T46	T67				WD		
Senior British Open Championship	T14	2	T10	T65		T51	70		T24		NT						CUT

Top 10
Did not play

CUT = missed the halfway cut
WD = withdrew
"T" indicates a tie for a place
NT = no tournament due to COVID-19 pandemic

== U.S. national team appearances ==
Professional

- Ryder Cup: 1987, 1989 (tie), 1991 (winners), 2002
- Four Tours World Championship: 1987 (winners), 1989 (winners), 1990
- Dunhill Cup: 1989 (winners), 1990
- Presidents Cup: 1998
- UBS Warburg Cup: 2001 (winners)
- Wendy's 3-Tour Challenge: 2001 (PGA Tour), 2003 (PGA Tour, winners), 2005 (PGA Tour), 2011 (Champions Tour, winners)

== See also ==
- Spring 1981 PGA Tour Qualifying School graduates
- 1983 PGA Tour Qualifying School graduates
- List of American Ryder Cup golfers
- List of Florida Gators men's golfers on the PGA Tour
