= 2013 PGA Championship =

Tournament information
- Dates: August 8–11, 2013
- Location: Pittsford, New York; 43.113°N 77.533°W
- Courses: Oak Hill Country Club, East Course
- Organized by: PGA of America
- Tours: PGA Tour; European Tour; Japan Golf Tour

Statistics
- Par: 70
- Length: 7,163 yards (6,550 m)
- Field: 156 players, 75 after cut
- Cut: 143 (+3)
- Prize fund: $8,000,000 €6,066,120
- Winner's share: $1,445,000 €1,095,693

Champion
- (United States) Jason Dufner
- 270 (−10)
- Location in the United States Location in New York

The 2013 PGA Championship was the 95th PGA Championship, played August 8–11 at the East Course of Oak Hill Country Club in Pittsford, New York, a suburb southeast of Rochester. Jason Dufner won his first major title, two strokes ahead of runner-up Jim Furyk.

== Venue ==
This was the third PGA Championship at the East Course at Oak Hill; Jack Nicklaus won in 1980 and Shaun Micheel in 2003. It also hosted three U.S. Opens, in 1956, 1968, and 1989, and the Ryder Cup in 1995.

=== Course layout ===
East Course

Hole	1	2	3	4	5	6	7	8	9	Out	10	11	12	13	14	15	16	17	18	In	Total
Yards	460	401	214	570	428	175	461	428	452	3,589	429	226	372	598	323	181	439	509	497	3,574	7,163
Par	4	4	3	5	4	3	4	4	4	35	4	3	4	5	4	3	4	4	4	35	70

Previous course lengths for major championships

- 7,134 yards (6,523 m) – par 70, 2003 PGA Championship
- 6,902 yards (6,311 m) – par 70, 1989 U.S. Open
- 6,964 yards (6,368 m) – par 70, 1980 PGA Championship
- 6,962 yards (6,366 m) – par 70, 1968 U.S. Open
- 6,902 yards (6,311 m) – par 70, 1956 U.S. Open

== Field ==
The following qualification criteria were used to select the field. Each player is listed according to the first category by which he qualified with additional categories in which he qualified shown in parentheses.

1. All former PGA Champions

- Rich Beem
- Keegan Bradley (6,8,9)
- Pádraig Harrington
- Martin Kaymer (9)
- Davis Love III
- Rory McIlroy (2,6,8,9,10)
- Shaun Micheel
- Phil Mickelson (3,4,8,9,10)
- Vijay Singh
- David Toms
- Tiger Woods (6,8,9,10)
- Yang Yong-eun
- John Daly did not play due to an elbow injury.
- Mark Brooks withdrew with an unspecified injury.
- The following former champions did not compete: Paul Azinger, Jack Burke Jr., Steve Elkington, Dow Finsterwald, Raymond Floyd, Doug Ford, Al Geiberger, Wayne Grady, David Graham, Hubert Green, Don January, John Mahaffey, Larry Nelson, Bobby Nichols, Jack Nicklaus, Gary Player, Nick Price, Jeff Sluman, Dave Stockton, Hal Sutton, Lee Trevino, Bob Tway, Lanny Wadkins

2. Last five U.S. Open Champions

- Lucas Glover
- Graeme McDowell (6,8,9,10)
- Justin Rose (6,8,9,10)
- Webb Simpson (8,9)

3. Last five Masters Champions

- Ángel Cabrera (8)
- Charl Schwartzel (8)
- Adam Scott (6,8,10)
- Bubba Watson (6,8,9)

4. Last five British Open Champions

- Stewart Cink
- Darren Clarke
- Ernie Els (8)
- Louis Oosthuizen (8) withdrew with a neck injury.

5. Current Senior PGA Champion

- Kōki Idoki

6. 15 low scorers and ties in the 2012 PGA Championship

- Tim Clark (8)
- Ben Curtis
- Jamie Donaldson
- Peter Hanson (9)
- David Lynn (8)
- Geoff Ogilvy
- Carl Pettersson (8)
- Ian Poulter (8,9,10)
- Steve Stricker (8,9)
- Blake Adams did not compete due to hip surgery.

7. 20 low scorers in the 2013 PGA Professional National Championship

- J. C. Anderson
- Danny Balin
- Mark Brown
- Caine Fitzgerald
- Bob Gaus
- Kirk Hanefeld
- Rob Labritz
- Jeffrey Martin
- Dave McNabb
- David Muttitt
- Rod Perry
- Ryan Polzin
- Lee Rhind
- Mark Sheftic
- Sonny Skinner
- Mike Small
- Stuart Smith
- Jeff Sorenson
- Bob Sowards
- Chip Sullivan

8. Top 70 leaders in official money standings from the 2012 WGC-Bridgestone Invitational to the 2013 RBC Canadian Open

- Bae Sang-moon (10)
- Charlie Beljan (10)
- Jonas Blixt (10)
- Roberto Castro
- Kevin Chappell
- Jason Day
- Brendon de Jonge
- Graham DeLaet
- Luke Donald (9)
- Jason Dufner (9)
- Ken Duke (10)
- Harris English (10)
- Rickie Fowler
- Jim Furyk (9)
- Sergio García (9,10)
- Robert Garrigus
- Brian Gay (10)
- Bill Haas (10)
- Russell Henley (10)
- Charley Hoffman
- Billy Horschel (10)
- Charles Howell III
- John Huh
- Dustin Johnson (9,10)
- Zach Johnson (9)
- Chris Kirk
- Jason Kokrak
- Matt Kuchar (9,10)
- Martin Laird (10)
- Marc Leishman
- David Lingmerth
- Hunter Mahan
- John Merrick (10)
- Ryan Moore (10)
- Ryan Palmer
- Scott Piercy
- D. A. Points (10)
- Brandt Snedeker (9,10)
- Jordan Spieth (10)
- Kevin Stadler
- Scott Stallings
- Kyle Stanley
- Henrik Stenson
- Kevin Streelman (10)
- Chris Stroud
- Josh Teater
- Michael Thompson (10)
- Bo Van Pelt
- Jimmy Walker
- Nick Watney (10)
- Boo Weekley (10)
- Lee Westwood (9)

9. Members of the United States and European 2012 Ryder Cup teams (provided they are ranked in the top 100 in the Official World Golf Ranking on July 28)

- Nicolas Colsaerts
- Paul Lawrie
- Francesco Molinari

10. Winners of tournaments co-sponsored or approved by the PGA Tour since the 2012 PGA Championship

- Woody Austin
- Scott Brown
- Derek Ernst
- Tommy Gainey
- Gary Woodland

11. Vacancies are filled by the first available player from the list of alternates (those below 70th place in official money standings).

- Matt Every

12. The PGA of America reserves the right to invite additional players not included in the categories listed above

- Kiradech Aphibarnrat
- Thomas Bjørn
- Rafa Cabrera-Bello
- Paul Casey
- K. J. Choi
- George Coetzee
- Gonzalo Fernández-Castaño
- Marcus Fraser
- Hiroyuki Fujita
- Stephen Gallacher
- Branden Grace
- Luke Guthrie
- Mikko Ilonen
- Ryo Ishikawa
- Freddie Jacobson
- Scott Jamieson
- Miguel Ángel Jiménez
- Brooks Koepka
- Pablo Larrazábal
- Shane Lowry
- Joost Luiten
- Matteo Manassero
- Hideki Matsuyama
- Paul McGinley
- Alex Norén
- Thorbjørn Olesen
- Richie Ramsay
- Brett Rumford
- John Senden
- Marcel Siem
- Richard Sterne
- Thongchai Jaidee
- Peter Uihlein
- Jaco van Zyl
- Marc Warren
- Tom Watson
- Bernd Wiesberger
- Danny Willett
- Chris Wood
- Brendan Jones withdrew prior to the tournament.

Alternates (per category 11):

1. David Hearn – replaced Brendan Jones
2. Matt Jones – took spot reserved for WGC-Bridgestone Invitational winner
3. J. J. Henry – replaced Mark Brooks

== Round summaries ==
=== First round ===
Thursday, August 8, 2013

Jim Furyk and Adam Scott shot 5-under-par 65s and were tied for the lead after the first round. Rain suspended play for 71 minutes.

Place	Player	Score	To par
T1	(United States) Jim Furyk	65	−5
T1	(Australia) Adam Scott	65	−5
T3	(Canada) David Hearn	66	−4
T3	(England) Lee Westwood	66	−4
T5	(England) Paul Casey	67	−3
T5	(Australia) Jason Day	67	−3
T5	(Australia) Marcus Fraser	67	−3
T5	(United States) Robert Garrigus	67	−3
T5	(United States) Matt Kuchar	67	−3
T5	(United States) Scott Piercy	67	−3

=== Second round ===
Friday, August 9, 2013

Jason Dufner posted a 7-under-par 63 to break the Oak Hill Country Club course record, which was held by Ben Hogan and Curtis Strange and tied in the same round by Webb Simpson. He held a two-stroke lead over Furyk, Scott, and Matt Kuchar. Woody Austin suffered a four-stroke penalty for carrying too many clubs in his bag for the first two holes and missed the cut by one stroke.

Place	Player	Score	To par
1	(United States) Jason Dufner	68-63=131	−9
T2	(United States) Jim Furyk	65-68=133	−7
T2	(United States) Matt Kuchar	67-66=133	−7
T2	(Australia) Adam Scott	65-68=133	−7
T5	(England) Justin Rose	68-66=134	−6
T5	(Sweden) Henrik Stenson	68-66=134	−6
T7	(United States) Robert Garrigus	67-68=135	−5
T7	(United States) Steve Stricker	68-67=135	−5
T9	(Australia) Marcus Fraser	67-69=136	−4
T9	(United States) Charley Hoffman	69-67=136	−4
T9	(Germany) Martin Kaymer	68-68=136	−4
T9	(United States) Webb Simpson	72-64=136	−4

=== Third round ===
Saturday, August 10, 2013

Furyk shot a 68 to take the lead going into the final round. Dufner was one shot behind, and Henrik Stenson was two shots behind. The low round of the day went to Dustin Johnson, who shot a 5-under-par 65 to move into a tie for ninth place.

Place	Player	Score	To par
1	(United States) Jim Furyk	65-68-68=201	−9
2	(United States) Jason Dufner	68-63-71=202	−8
3	(Sweden) Henrik Stenson	68-66-69=203	−7
4	(Sweden) Jonas Blixt	68-70-66=204	−6
T5	(Australia) Adam Scott	65-68-72=205	−5
T5	(United States) Steve Stricker	68-67-70=205	−5
T7	(Northern Ireland) Rory McIlroy	69-71-67=207	−3
T7	(England) Lee Westwood	66-73-68=207	−3
T9	(United States) Roberto Castro	68-69-71=208	−2
T9	(United States) Dustin Johnson	72-71-65=208	−2
T9	(United States) Kevin Streelman	70-72-66=208	−2

=== Final round ===
Sunday, August 11, 2013

Jim Furyk went into the final round with a one-shot lead at nine-under-par over Jason Dufner, but was tied for the lead when Dufner birdied the fourth hole. At the fifth hole, Dufner took the lead outright with a birdie to go 10-under-par, but Furyk regained a share of the lead with a birdie of his own on six. At No. 8, Dufner took the lead with a birdie to move to 11-under-par, and from that point onwards he was the sole leader. Furyk bogeyed the ninth hole and from that point until the end of the championship the margin was affixed at two strokes. At No. 16, both golfers made birdie to go to 12-under and 10-under-par respectively, however at the subsequent two holes they made bogeys to finish out their respective rounds at 10-under and 8-under-par. Dufner shot a two-under-par round of 68 to Furyk's one-over-par, 71. Henrik Stenson, who started the day two shots out of the lead, pulled within one stroke after eagling the fourth hole, but never really threatened the leaders after that and finished the tournament in solo third place.

Place	Player	Score	To par	Money ($)
1	(United States) Jason Dufner	68-63-71-68=270	−10	1,445,000
2	(United States) Jim Furyk	65-68-68-71=272	−8	865,000
3	(Sweden) Henrik Stenson	68-66-69-70=273	−7	545,000
4	(Sweden) Jonas Blixt	68-70-66-70=274	−6	385,000
T5	(United States) Scott Piercy	67-71-72-65=275	−5	304,000
T5	(Australia) Adam Scott	65-68-72-70=275	−5	304,000
7	(United States) David Toms	71-69-69-67=276	−4	259,000
T8	(Australia) Jason Day	67-71-72-67=277	−3	206,250
T8	(United States) Dustin Johnson	72-71-65-69=277	−3	206,250
T8	(United States) Zach Johnson	69-70-70-68=277	−3	206,250
T8	(Northern Ireland) Rory McIlroy	69-71-67-70=277	−3	206,250

==== Scorecard ====
Final round

Hole	1	2	3	4	5	6	7	8	9	10	11	12	13	14	15	16	17	18
Par	4	4	3	5	4	3	4	4	4	4	3	4	5	4	3	4	4	4
(United States) Dufner	−8	−8	−8	−9	−10	−10	−10	−11	−11	−11	−11	−11	−11	−11	−11	−12	−11	−10
(United States) Furyk	−9	−9	−9	−9	−9	−10	−10	−10	−9	−9	−9	−9	−9	−9	−9	−10	−9	−8
(Sweden) Stenson	−6	−6	−6	−8	−8	−8	−7	−8	−8	−8	−8	−8	−9	−8	−8	−8	−7	−7
(Sweden) Blixt	−5	−4	−4	−4	−5	−5	−5	−5	−5	−6	−6	−6	−7	−8	−7	−8	−7	−6
(United States) Piercy	E	+1	E	−1	−1	−1	−2	−3	−4	−4	−5	−5	−6	−6	−5	−6	−6	−5
(Australia) Scott	−4	−5	−5	−6	−6	−5	−5	−5	−6	−6	−6	−7	−6	−6	−7	−6	−6	−5
(United States) Toms	−1	−1	−1	−2	−2	−3	−2	−2	−2	−2	−2	−2	−2	−2	−2	−3	−4	−4
(Northern Ireland) McIlroy	−3	−3	−4	−4	−1	−1	−1	−1	−2	−3	−3	−3	−4	−4	−4	−3	−3	−3
(United States) Stricker	−5	−5	−4	−4	−4	−4	−4	−4	−4	−3	−3	−3	−3	−4	−2	−2	−2	−2
(England) Westwood	−3	−2	E	E	+1	+1	+2	+2	+3	+2	+2	+2	+2	+1	+2	+2	+2	+3

Cumulative tournament scores, relative to par

Eagle	Birdie	Bogey	Double bogey	Triple bogey+
