= 2011 PGA Championship =

Coordinates: 34.004°N 84.193°W

Tournament information
- Dates: August 11–14, 2011
- Location: Johns Creek, Georgia
- Course(s): Atlanta Athletic Club, Highlands Course
- Organized by: PGA of America
- Tour(s): PGA Tour; PGA European Tour; Japan Golf Tour

Statistics
- Par: 70
- Length: 7,467 yards (6,828 m)
- Field: 156 players, 75 after cut
- Cut: 144 (+4)
- Prize fund: $8,000,000 €5,645,086
- Winner's share: $1,445,000 €1,028,126

Champion
- (United States) Keegan Bradley
- 272 (−8), playoff

The 2011 PGA Championship was the 93rd PGA Championship, held August 11–14, 2011 at the Atlanta Athletic Club in Johns Creek, Georgia, a suburb northeast of Atlanta. Keegan Bradley won his only major championship in a three-hole playoff over Jason Dufner on the Highlands Course; Dufner won the title two years later.

Television coverage was provided in the United States by CBS and TNT, and in the United Kingdom by Sky Sports.

== Venue ==
It was the third PGA Championship held at the Highlands Course of the Atlanta Athletic Club; the last was a decade earlier in 2001. David Toms laid up on the final hole and one-putted for a par to win by one stroke over Phil Mickelson. The first at AAC was in 1981, when Larry Nelson won by four strokes over Fuzzy Zoeller. The course also hosted the U.S. Open in 1976, won by Jerry Pate.

== Course layout ==
The 2011 PGA Championship at Atlanta Athletic Club, Highlands Course
Tee	Rating/Slope	1	2	3	4	5	6	7	8	9	Out	10	11	12	13	14	15	16	17	18	In	Total
Yardage	n/a	454	512	475	219	565	425	184	467	426	3,727	442	457	551	372	468	260	476	207	507	3,740	7,467
Par		4	4	4	3	5	4	3	4	4	35	4	4	5	4	4	3	4	3	4	35	70

Lengths of the course for previous majors:

- 7,213 yards (6,596 m), par 70 - 2001 PGA Championship
- 7,070 yards (6,465 m), par 70 - 1981 PGA Championship
- 7,015 yards (6,415 m), par 70 - 1976 U.S. Open

== Field ==
Location in the United States
Location in Georgia

The following qualification criteria were used to select the field. Each player is listed according to the first category by which he qualified with additional categories in which he qualified shown in parentheses.

1. All former PGA Champions
Rich Beem, Mark Brooks, John Daly, Steve Elkington (6), Pádraig Harrington (4,9), Martin Kaymer (6,8,9), Davis Love III, Shaun Micheel, Phil Mickelson (3,6,8,9,10), Larry Nelson, Vijay Singh (8), David Toms (8,10), Tiger Woods (2,9), Yang Yong-eun (8)

- Paul Azinger withdrew.
- The following former champions did not compete: Jack Burke Jr., Dow Finsterwald, Raymond Floyd, Doug Ford, Al Geiberger, Wayne Grady, David Graham, Hubert Green, Don January, John Mahaffey, Bobby Nichols, Jack Nicklaus, Gary Player, Nick Price, Jeff Sluman, Dave Stockton, Hal Sutton, Lee Trevino, Bob Tway, Lanny Wadkins

2. Last five U.S. Open Champions
Ángel Cabrera (3), Lucas Glover (8,10), Graeme McDowell (9), Rory McIlroy (6,8,9,10)

3. Last five Masters Champions
Trevor Immelman, Zach Johnson (6,8,9), Charl Schwartzel (8,10)

4. Last five British Open Champions
Stewart Cink (8,9), Darren Clarke (8,10), Louis Oosthuizen

5. Current Senior PGA Champion

- Tom Watson elected not to play.

6. 15 low scorers and ties in the 2010 PGA Championship
Paul Casey (8), Jason Day (8), Jason Dufner (8), Simon Dyson, Dustin Johnson (8,9,10), Matt Kuchar (8,9,10), Liang Wenchong, Bryce Molder, Camilo Villegas, Bubba Watson (8,9,10)

7. 20 low scorers in the 2011 PGA Professional National Championship
Danny Balin, Brian Cairns, Todd Camplin, Jeff Coston, Sean Dougherty, Scott Erdmann, David Hutsell, Faber Jamerson, Marty Jertson, Brad Lardon, Robert McClellan, Rob Moss, Mike Northern, Dan Olsen, Steve Schneiter, Mike Small, Stuart Smith, Jeff Sorenson, Bob Sowards, Craig Stevens

8. Top 70 leaders in official money standings from the 2010 WGC-Bridgestone Invitational to the 2011 Greenbrier Classic
Robert Allenby, Arjun Atwal (10), Aaron Baddeley (10), Keegan Bradley (10), Jonathan Byrd (10), K. J. Choi (10), Brendon de Jonge, Luke Donald (9,10), Rickie Fowler (9), Jim Furyk (9,10), Tommy Gainey, Robert Garrigus (10), Brian Gay, Retief Goosen, Bill Haas (10), Charley Hoffman (10), J. B. Holmes, Charles Howell III, Freddie Jacobson (10), Robert Karlsson, Chris Kirk (10), Martin Laird (10), Spencer Levin, Hunter Mahan (9), Steve Marino, Ryan Moore, Kevin Na, Geoff Ogilvy, Sean O'Hair (10), Jeff Overton (9), Ryan Palmer, D. A. Points (10), John Rollins, Andrés Romero, Justin Rose, Rory Sabbatini (10), Adam Scott (10), John Senden, Webb Simpson, Heath Slocum (10), Brandt Snedeker (10), Scott Stallings (10), Brendan Steele (10), Kevin Streelman, Steve Stricker (9,10), Cameron Tringale, Bo Van Pelt, Jhonattan Vegas (10), Johnson Wagner (10), Nick Watney (10), Charlie Wi, Mark Wilson (10), Gary Woodland (10)

9. Members of the United States and European 2010 Ryder Cup teams (provided they are ranked in the top 100 in the Official World Golf Rankings)
Ross Fisher, Peter Hanson, Miguel Ángel Jiménez, Edoardo Molinari, Francesco Molinari, Ian Poulter, Lee Westwood

10. Winners of tournaments co-sponsored or approved by the PGA Tour since the 2010 PGA Championship
Michael Bradley, Harrison Frazar, Rocco Mediate, Scott Piercy

11. Vacancies are filled by the first available player from the list of alternates (those below 70th place in official money standings).
J. J. Henry, Ryuji Imada, Brandt Jobe, Jerry Kelly, Bill Lunde

Alternates:

1. Tom Gillis (ranked 76) replaced Paul Azinger.
2. D. J. Trahan (ranked 79) took the spot reserved for WGC-Bridgestone Invitational winner who had already qualified.

12. The PGA of America reserves the right to invite additional players not included in the categories listed above
Thomas Aiken, Fredrik Andersson Hed, Ricky Barnes, Thomas Bjørn, Grégory Bourdy, Ben Crane, Brian Davis, Jamie Donaldson, Johan Edfors, Ernie Els, Hiroyuki Fujita, Stephen Gallacher, Sergio García, Richard Green, Anders Hansen, Tetsuji Hiratsuka, David Horsey, Yuta Ikeda, Ryo Ishikawa, Raphaël Jacquelin, Brendan Jones, Anthony Kim, Kim Kyung-tae, Pablo Larrazábal, Matteo Manassero, Noh Seung-yul, Alex Norén, José María Olazábal, Jerry Pate, Álvaro Quirós, Scott Verplank

- Tim Clark withdrew due to an elbow injury
- Nicolas Colsaerts withdrew due to an elbow injury.

== Round summaries ==
=== First round ===
Thursday, August 11, 2011

Steve Stricker set the early lead with a 7-under-par 63, after narrowly missing a putt on his final hole that would have set a new major championship record of 62. Jerry Kelly finished with 65, in what was shaping up to be a good chance for the U.S. to get its first major win since the 2010 Masters Tournament. Pre-tournament favorite Rory McIlroy injured his wrist on the 3rd hole, but was able to grind out an even par round of 70. The defending champion, Martin Kaymer shot a 2-over-par round of 72 to sit 9 shots off the lead, while the champion from 2003, Shaun Micheel shot a 4-under-par round of 66 to be in 3rd place alone. Tiger Woods, despite stating that he felt good about his game before the tournament, shot a 77, to finish +7 and in danger of missing the cut.

Place	Player	Score	To par
1	(United States) Steve Stricker	63	−7
2	(United States) Jerry Kelly	65	−5
3	(United States) Shaun Micheel	66	−4
4	(United States) Scott Verplank	67	−3
T5	(Zimbabwe) Brendon de Jonge	68	−2
T5	(England) Simon Dyson	68	−2
T5	(United States) Bill Haas	68	−2
T5	(Denmark) Anders Hansen	68	−2
T5	(United States) Brandt Jobe	68	−2
T5	(United States) Davis Love III	68	−2
T5	(Italy) Matteo Manassero	68	−2
T5	(Australia) John Senden	68	−2

=== Second round ===
Friday, August 12, 2011

Place	Player	Score	To par
T1	(United States) Keegan Bradley	71-64=135	−5
T1	(United States) Jason Dufner	70-65=135	−5
T3	(United States) Jim Furyk	71-65=136	−4
T3	(United States) D. A. Points	69-67=136	−4
T3	(Australia) John Senden	68-68=136	−4
T3	(United States) Scott Verplank	67-69=136	−4
T7	(Denmark) Anders Hansen	68-69=137	−3
T7	(United States) Brandt Jobe	68-69=137	−3
T7	(United States) Brendan Steele	69-68=137	−3
T7	(United States) Steve Stricker	63-74=137	−3

=== Third round ===
Saturday, August 13, 2011

Place	Player	Score	To par
T1	(United States) Jason Dufner	70-65-68=203	−7
T1	(United States) Brendan Steele	69-68-66=203	−7
3	(United States) Keegan Bradley	71-64-69=204	−6
4	(United States) Scott Verplank	67-69-69=205	−5
5	(United States) Steve Stricker	63-74-69=206	−4
T6	(Denmark) Anders Hansen	68-69-70=207	−3
T6	(United States) D. A. Points	69-67-71=207	−3
T8	(Sweden) Robert Karlsson	70-71-67=208	−2
T8	(South Africa) Charl Schwartzel	71-71-66=208	−2
T8	(Australia) Adam Scott	69-69-70=208	−2
T8	(Australia) John Senden	68-68-72=208	−2
T8	(United States) David Toms	72-71-65=208	−2

=== Final round ===
Sunday, August 14, 2011

Third round co-leader Brendan Steele faded quickly with four early bogeys; he shot 77 and ended in a tie for 19th. Steve Stricker birdied the first to pull within a shot of the lead, but a double bogey on 4 led to a final score of 73. Robert Karlsson stormed into contention with an eagle on the 551-yard (504 m) par-5 12th hole to pull him to −8 and within a shot of leader Jason Dufner. Anders Hansen also began a late charge and after birdies at 12 and 13 pulled within two shots of Dufner at −7. David Toms also made a charge, birdieing six of nine holes in the middle of the round, but a bogey on 16 dropped him out of contention. Keegan Bradley made an eagle of his own on 12 after knocking the approach to two feet to tie Dufner for the lead at −9. Dufner birdied both 12 and 13 to take a two-shot lead at −11.

At the 260-yard (238 m) par-3 15th hole, Bradley hit his tee shot left of the green, then chipped into the water and was unable to get up and down from drop area. The triple-bogey 6 left him at −6, five shots out of the lead with three holes to play. Following his eagle at 12, Karlsson parred the next three holes but bogeyed the last three to end his chances for a first major. After a bogey by Hansen at 16, Dufner had a five-shot lead at −11 on the 15th tee. He hit his tee shot into the water, but got up-and-down for a bogey to drop to −10. Scott Verplank chipped in for birdie from the bunker on 16 to pull within three shots of the lead. His playing partner Bradley also birdied 16 to pull within three shots. Hansen made a 15-footer (4.5 m) for birdie on 17 to pull to −7, three shots back. Verplank needed to attack the par-3 17th hole, but hit his tee shot from 207 yards (189 m) off the protecting wall into the water to end his chances of a late charge. Bradley landed his tee shot in the middle of the green. Dufner hit his approach on 16 into the greenside bunker; but again failed to save par and fell to −9. Bradley then sank a 50-foot (15 m) putt for birdie to get to −8 and cut the lead to one, as Dufner watched from the 17th tee.

Hansen two-putted for par on 18 and had the clubhouse lead of −7. After hitting on the 17th green, Dufner knocked his first putt well past the hole and bogeyed to fall to −8; his five-stroke lead was gone. After hitting hybrid off the 18th tee, Bradley hit his approach to the center of the green, leaving a long birdie putt. He lagged to one foot and tapped in to post the new clubhouse lead of −8. After Dufner hit driver in the fairway on 18 he hit four iron to the middle of the green. Dufner than lagged his putt to two feet (0.6 m) and tapped in to tie Bradley and force a three-hole playoff.

Place	Player	Score	To par	Money ($)
T1	(United States) Keegan Bradley	71-64-69-68=272	−8	Playoff
T1	(United States) Jason Dufner	70-65-68-69=272	−8	Playoff
3	(Denmark) Anders Hansen	68-69-70-66=273	−7	545,000
T4	(Sweden) Robert Karlsson	70-71-67-67=275	−5	331,000
T4	(United States) David Toms	72-71-65-67=275	−5	331,000
T4	(United States) Scott Verplank	67-69-69-70=275	−5	331,000
7	(Australia) Adam Scott	69-69-70-68=276	−4	259,000
T8	(England) Luke Donald	70-71-68-68=277	−3	224,500
T8	(England) Lee Westwood	71-68-70-68=277	−3	224,500
T10	(United States) Kevin Na	72-69-70-67=278	−2	188,000
T10	(United States) D. A. Points	69-67-71-71=278	−2	188,000

==== Scorecard ====
Final round

Hole	1	2	3	4	5	6	7	8	9	10	11	12	13	14	15	16	17	18
Par	4	4	4	3	5	4	3	4	4	4	4	5	4	4	3	4	3	4
(United States) Bradley	−7	−7	−6	−6	−7	−7	−7	−8	−7	−7	−7	−9	−9	−9	−6	−7	−8	−8
(United States) Dufner	−7	−7	−7	−7	−7	−8	−8	−9	−9	−9	−9	−10	−11	−11	−10	−9	−8	−8
(Denmark) Hansen	−3	−3	−4	−4	−4	−5	−5	−5	−5	−5	−6	−7	−7	−7	−7	−6	−7	−7
(Sweden) Karlsson	−2	−2	−2	−3	−3	−4	−4	−5	−5	−6	−6	−8	−8	−8	−8	−7	−6	−5
(United States) Toms	−2	−1	E	E	−1	−2	−2	−3	−4	−4	−5	−5	−6	−6	−6	−5	−5	−5
(United States) Verplank	−5	−6	−6	−6	−6	−5	−5	−5	−5	−5	−4	−6	−6	−6	−6	−7	−5	−5
(United States) Stricker	−5	−4	−4	−2	−2	−2	−2	−2	−2	−2	−2	−3	−3	−3	−3	−3	−2	−1
(United States) Steele	−6	−6	−6	−5	−4	−4	−4	−3	−3	−3	−3	−5	−4	−3	−3	−3	−2	E

Cumulative tournament scores, relative to par

Eagle	Birdie	Bogey	Double bogey	Triple bogey+

=== Playoff ===
The three-hole aggregate playoff was played on the final three holes, with sudden-death to follow in case of a tie. Starting on 16, Dufner's approach shot rolled right by the hole and settled 8 feet behind the cup. Bradley answered by knocking his approach to four feet. After Dufner missed his birdie putt, Bradley made his short birdie putt to take a one shot lead. On the playoff's par-three second hole, Dufner and Bradley both put their tee balls on to the green. Dufner was first to play, from about 45 feet (14 m), and ran his putt 15 feet (4.5 m) past the hole. Bradley knocked his 20-foot (6 m) birdie putt 4 feet (1.2 m) past the hole. Dufner missed his long comebacker for par and Bradley made his par putt to take a two-shot lead with one hole to play.

Bradley elected to take hybrid off the tee on 18, as he did in regulation, and found the fairway. Dufner hit driver in the fairway, just as he did in regulation. With a two shot lead Bradley put his approach shot comfortably on the front of the green, leaving it 18 feet (5.5 m) from the cup. Dufner knocked his approach next to Bradley's, about 20 feet (6 m) from the hole. Two strokes down, Dufner needed to make his birdie putt to have any chance to extend the playoff and did just that. Bradley then needed to two-putt for par to win his first major. Bradley lagged the first putt just past the hole, then tapped in for the win. Bradley became the first male player to win in his major debut since Ben Curtis at the 2003 Open Championship and the first to win a major using a long (belly) putter.

This was the seventh consecutive major championship won by a player who had not previously captured a major title, establishing a new record.

Place	Player	Score	To par	Money ($)
1	(United States) Keegan Bradley	3-3-4=10	−1	1,445,000
2	(United States) Jason Dufner	4-4-3=11	E	865,000

==== Scorecard ====
Playoff

Hole	16	17	18
Par	4	3	4
(United States) Bradley	−1	−1	−1
(United States) Dufner	E	+1	E

Cumulative tournament scores, relative to par

Birdie	Bogey
