= 2012 PGA Championship =

Tournament information
- Dates: August 9–12, 2012
- Location: Kiawah Island, South Carolina; 32.612°N 80.023°W
- Courses: Kiawah Island Golf Resort; Ocean Course
- Organized by: PGA of America
- Tours: PGA Tour; European Tour; Japan Golf Tour

Statistics
- Par: 72
- Length: 7,676 yards (7,019 m)
- Field: 156 players, 72 after cut
- Cut: 150 (+6)
- Prize fund: $8,000,000 €6,507,051
- Winner's share: $1,445,000 €1,190,937

Champion
- (Northern Ireland) Rory McIlroy
- 275 (−13)

Location map
- Location in the United States Location in South Carolina

The 2012 PGA Championship was the 94th PGA Championship, played August 9–12 at the Ocean Course of the Kiawah Island Golf Resort in Kiawah Island, South Carolina, southwest of Charleston. Rory McIlroy shot a bogey-free 66 (−6) in the final round to win his second major title by eight strokes over runner-up David Lynn.

The victory margin was a record for the PGA Championship, surpassing the seven-stroke win in 1980 by Jack Nicklaus for his fifth PGA and seventeenth major title. The winner of the U.S. Open in 2011, also by eight strokes, McIlroy became the sixth-youngest winner of two majors at 23 years and 3 months.

Television coverage was provided in the United States by CBS and TNT, and in the United Kingdom by Sky Sports.

It was the first major championship at Kiawah Island; the Ocean Course hosted the Ryder Cup in 1991. The PGA Championship returned in May 2021.

== Venue ==
=== Course layout ===
Ocean Course

Hole	1	2	3	4	5	6	7	8	9	Out	10	11	12	13	14	15	16	17	18	In	Total
Yards	396	557	390	458	188	480	579	198	494	3,740	447	593	412	497	238	444	581	223	501	3,936	7,676
Par	4	5	4	4	3	4	5	3	4	36	4	5	4	4	3	4	5	3	4	36	72

== Field ==
The following qualification criteria were used to select the field. Each player is listed according to the first category by which he qualified with additional categories in which he qualified shown in parentheses.

1. All former PGA Champions

- Rich Beem
- Keegan Bradley (6,8,10)
- Mark Brooks
- John Daly
- Pádraig Harrington (4,8,9)
- Martin Kaymer (9)
- Davis Love III
- Shaun Micheel
- Phil Mickelson (3,8,9,10)
- Vijay Singh (8)
- David Toms (6,8)
- Tiger Woods (2,8,9,10)
- Yang Yong-eun
- The following former champions did not compete: Paul Azinger, Jack Burke Jr., Steve Elkington, Dow Finsterwald, Raymond Floyd, Doug Ford, Al Geiberger, Wayne Grady, David Graham, Hubert Green, Don January, John Mahaffey, Larry Nelson, Bobby Nichols, Jack Nicklaus, Gary Player, Nick Price, Jeff Sluman, Dave Stockton, Hal Sutton, Lee Trevino, Bob Tway, Lanny Wadkins

2. Last five U.S. Open champions

- Lucas Glover
- Graeme McDowell (8,9)
- Rory McIlroy (8,9,10)
- Webb Simpson (8,10)

3. Last five Masters champions

- Ángel Cabrera
- Trevor Immelman (6)
- Charl Schwartzel (6)
- Bubba Watson (8,9,10)

4. Last five British Open champions

- Stewart Cink
- Darren Clarke
- Ernie Els (8)
- Louis Oosthuizen (8)

5. Current Senior PGA champion

- Roger Chapman

6. 15 low scorers and ties in the 2011 PGA Championship

- Luke Donald (8,9,10)
- Jason Dufner (8,10)
- Sergio García
- Bill Haas (8,10)
- Anders Hansen
- Robert Karlsson
- Kevin Na (8,10)
- D. A. Points (8)
- Adam Scott (8)
- Steve Stricker (8,9,10)
- Scott Verplank
- Nick Watney (8)
- Lee Westwood (8,9)
- Gary Woodland

7. 20 low scorers in the 2012 PGA Professional National Championship

- Danny Balin
- Frank Bensel
- Mark Brown
- Brian Cairns
- Jeff Coston
- Matt Dobyns
- Michael Frye
- Brian Gaffney
- Marty Jertson
- Darrell Kestner
- Mitch Lowe
- Kelly Mitchum
- Alan Morin
- Bill Murchison III
- Rod Perry
- Corey Prugh
- Paul Scaletta
- Mike Small
- Bob Sowards
- Doug Wade

8. Top 70 leaders in official money standings from the 2011 WGC-Bridgestone Invitational to the 2012 RBC Canadian Open

- Aaron Baddeley
- Jonathan Byrd
- Bud Cauley
- K. J. Choi
- Ben Curtis (10)
- Brian Davis
- Jason Day
- Brendon de Jonge
- Ken Duke
- Matt Every
- Rickie Fowler (9,10)
- Jim Furyk (9)
- Tommy Gainey
- Robert Garrigus
- Peter Hanson (9)
- Charley Hoffman
- Charles Howell III
- John Huh (10)
- Dustin Johnson (9,10)
- Zach Johnson (9,10)
- Matt Kuchar (9,10)
- Martin Laird
- Marc Leishman (10)
- Spencer Levin
- Hunter Mahan (9,10)
- George McNeill (10)
- Bryce Molder (10)
- Ryan Moore
- Noh Seung-yul
- Geoff Ogilvy
- Ryan Palmer
- Pat Perez
- Carl Pettersson (10)
- Scott Piercy (10)
- Ted Potter Jr. (10)
- Chez Reavie
- John Rollins
- Justin Rose (10)
- Rory Sabbatini
- John Senden
- Brandt Snedeker (10)
- Kyle Stanley (10)
- Michael Thompson
- Cameron Tringale
- Bo Van Pelt
- Johnson Wagner (10)
- Charlie Wi
- Mark Wilson (10)
- Ben Crane (10) did not play due to a back injury.

9. Members of the United States and European 2010 Ryder Cup teams (provided they are ranked in the top 100 in the Official World Golf Ranking on July 30)

- Miguel Ángel Jiménez
- Francesco Molinari
- Ian Poulter
- Stewart Cink, Ross Fisher, Edoardo Molinari, and Jeff Overton were ranked outside the top 100; Cink and Overton qualified through other categories.

10. Winners of tournaments co-sponsored or approved by the PGA Tour since the 2011 PGA Championship

- J. J. Henry
- Scott Stallings

11. Vacancies are filled by the first available player from the list of alternates (those below 70th place in official money standings).

- Blake Adams
- Sean O'Hair
- Jeff Overton
- Jimmy Walker

12. The PGA of America reserves the right to invite additional players not included in the categories listed above

- Thomas Aiken
- Robert Allenby
- Bae Sang-moon
- Thomas Bjørn
- Rafa Cabrera-Bello
- Paul Casey
- Greg Chalmers
- Tim Clark
- George Coetzee
- Nicolas Colsaerts
- Jamie Donaldson
- Simon Dyson
- Gonzalo Fernández-Castaño
- Marcus Fraser
- Hiroyuki Fujita
- Retief Goosen
- Branden Grace
- Michael Hoey
- Ryo Ishikawa
- Freddie Jacobson
- Thongchai Jaidee
- Brendan Jones
- Kim Kyung-tae
- Pablo Larrazábal
- Paul Lawrie
- Joost Luiten
- David Lynn
- Matteo Manassero
- Alex Norén
- José María Olazábal
- Thorbjørn Olesen
- Álvaro Quirós
- Robert Rock
- Marcel Siem
- Jeev Milkha Singh
- Toru Taniguchi
- Bernd Wiesberger

Alternates (per category 11):

1. William McGirt – took the spot reserved for the WGC-Bridgestone Invitational winner (Keegan Bradley already qualified)
2. Chris Stroud – replaced Ben Crane

Nine players appeared in their first major: Matt Dobyns, Michael Frye, William McGirt, Bill Murchison III, Rod Perry, Corey Prugh, Paul Scaletta, Doug Wade and Bernd Wiesberger.

== Round summaries ==
=== First round ===
Thursday, August 9, 2012

In good weather conditions, Carl Pettersson jumped out to a one-stroke lead with a bogey-free 66 (−6). Joost Luiten had raced to eight-under-par through 14 holes, but bogeyed each of his final four holes to fall back into the pack. World number one Luke Donald struggled to an opening 74 (+2), but number two Tiger Woods shot 69 (−3) in the morning wave of players.

Place	Player	Score	To par
1	(Sweden) Carl Pettersson	66	−6
T2	(Spain) Gonzalo Fernández-Castaño	67	−5
T2	(Northern Ireland) Rory McIlroy	67	−5
T2	(Sweden) Alex Norén	67	−5
T2	(United States) Gary Woodland	67	−5
T6	(Australia) Aaron Baddeley	68	−4
T6	(United States) Keegan Bradley	68	−4
T6	(United States) John Daly	68	−4
T6	(Netherlands) Joost Luiten	68	−4
T6	(Northern Ireland) Graeme McDowell	68	−4
T6	(Australia) Geoff Ogilvy	68	−4
T6	(United States) Scott Piercy	68	−4
T6	(Australia) Adam Scott	68	−4

=== Second round ===
Friday, August 10, 2012

The wind gusted 20–30 mph (30–50 km/h) throughout the day on Friday, making conditions much tougher than the first round of the tournament. Scoring was the toughest on record since the championship assumed a strokeplay format in 1958, with the average round being over 78; 72 players made the cut which fell at 150 (+6). Leader Pettersson backed up with a 74 (+2) but that was good enough to stay in a tie for the lead with two other players: Vijay Singh, the 1998 and 2004 champion, shot the lowest round of the day, 69 (−3), while Tiger Woods also rose into a tie for the lead with a 71 in which he made three birdies and two bogeys and stroked only 26 putts. The tough conditions and long course created very slow play; one player, Luiten, chose to complete his second round early on Saturday morning (the other two in his threesome chose to finish their rounds in near-darkness on Friday). He birdied the eighteenth for a round of 76 (+4), which put him at even-par 144.

Place	Player	Score	To par
T1	(Sweden) Carl Pettersson	66-74=140	−4
T1	(Fiji) Vijay Singh	71-69=140	−4
T1	(United States) Tiger Woods	69-71=140	−4
4	(England) Ian Poulter	70-71=141	−3
T5	(Wales) Jamie Donaldson	69-73=142	−2
T5	(Northern Ireland) Rory McIlroy	67-75=142	−2
T7	(United States) Blake Adams	71-72=143	−1
T7	(Australia) Aaron Baddeley	68-75=143	−1
T7	(South Africa) Trevor Immelman	71-72=143	−1
T7	(Australia) Adam Scott	68-75=143	−1

=== Third round ===
Saturday, August 11, 2012
Sunday, August 12, 2012

Weather conditions continued to worsen, and a fierce thunderstorm blew in late afternoon on Saturday, causing play to be postponed for the day with 26 of the 72 players still out on the course. Until the delay, scoring had been a little easier: world number 3 Rory McIlroy surged early with five birdies in his opening eight holes, and a remarkable par save on the third after his drive lodged in a tree. However, a bogey on nine, his final hole of the day, dropped him back into a share of the lead with two-time champion Singh, 26 years McIlroy's senior and attempting to become the oldest major winner in history. They led Adam Scott, also enjoying a fast start, by one, as Scott attempted to shrug off his near miss at the year's previous major. Woods struggled early and was three-over par with a lengthy putt for par at the eighth when play was halted. The overnight clubhouse lead was held by Bo Van Pelt, who carded a five-under 67 early to move to three-under for the week.

==== Weather delay ====
The leaderboard when play was halted on Saturday at 4:50 pm EDT:

Place	Player	Score	To par	Hole
T1	(Northern Ireland) Rory McIlroy	67-75-32=174	−6	9
T1	(Fiji) Vijay Singh	71-69-27=167	−6	7
3	(Australia) Adam Scott	68-75-32=175	−5	9
4	(Sweden) Carl Pettersson	66-74-32=172	−4	8
T5	(United States) Bo Van Pelt	73-73-67=213	−3	F
T5	(South Africa) Trevor Immelman	71-72-38=181	−3	10
T7	(United States) Steve Stricker	74-73-67=214	−2	F
T7	(Sweden) Peter Hanson	69-75-47=191	−2	12
T7	(Northern Ireland) Graeme McDowell	68-76-43=187	−2	11
T7	(England) Ian Poulter	70-71-33=174	−2	8

==== Conclusion ====
Play resumed Sunday at 7:45 am EDT

Place	Player	Score	To par
1	(Northern Ireland) Rory McIlroy	67-75-67=209	−7
2	(Sweden) Carl Pettersson	66-74-72=212	−4
T3	(South Africa) Trevor Immelman	71-72-70=213	−3
T3	(Australia) Adam Scott	68-75-70=213	−3
T3	(United States) Bo Van Pelt	73-73-67=213	−3
T6	(Sweden) Peter Hanson	69-75-70=214	−2
T6	(Fiji) Vijay Singh	71-69-74=214	−2
T6	(United States) Steve Stricker	74-73-67=214	−2
T6	(United States) Tiger Woods	69-71-74=214	−2
T10	(Wales) Jamie Donaldson	69-73-73=215	−1
T10	(Republic of Ireland) Pádraig Harrington	70-76-69=215	−1
T10	(England) David Lynn	73-74-68=215	−1
T10	(Northern Ireland) Graeme McDowell	68-76-71=215	−1
T10	(England) Ian Poulter	70-71-74=215	−1
T10	(United States) Jimmy Walker	73-75-67=215	−1

=== Final round ===
Sunday, August 12, 2012

Ian Poulter made an early charge by making five birdies in a row to start his round, but his charge fizzled on the back nine and he finished with four bogeys in the last six holes. Pettersson was in contention early in the round with a front nine 34 despite a rules infraction where he received a two-stroke penalty from moving a leaf in a lateral hazard, though he also fell out of contention on the back nine when McIlroy pulled away. Defending champion Keegan Bradley tied for third after a final-round 68. McIlroy shot a bogey-free 66 (−6) with only 24 putts, winning the championship by a record eight strokes, capped with a twenty-foot (6 m) birdie putt on the final hole. The previous PGA record winning margin was seven strokes, by Jack Nicklaus at age forty in 1980, his 17th major.

Place	Player	Score	To par	Money ($)
1	(Northern Ireland) Rory McIlroy	67-75-67-66=275	−13	1,445,000
2	(England) David Lynn	73-74-68-68=283	−5	865,000
T3	(United States) Keegan Bradley	68-77-71-68=284	−4	384,500
T3	(Sweden) Carl Pettersson	66-74-72-72=284	−4	384,500
T3	(England) Ian Poulter	70-71-74-69=284	−4	384,500
T3	(England) Justin Rose	69-79-70-66=284	−4	384,500
T7	(United States) Blake Adams	71-72-75-67=285	−3	226,000
T7	(Wales) Jamie Donaldson	69-73-73-70=285	−3	226,000
T7	(Sweden) Peter Hanson	69-75-70-71=285	−3	226,000
T7	(United States) Steve Stricker	74-73-67-71=285	−3	226,000

==== Scorecard ====
Final round

Hole	1	2	3	4	5	6	7	8	9	10	11	12	13	14	15	16	17	18
Par	4	5	4	4	3	4	5	3	4	4	5	4	4	3	4	5	3	4
(Northern Ireland) McIlroy	−7	−8	−9	−9	−9	−9	−10	−10	−10	−10	−10	−11	−11	−11	−11	−12	−12	−13
(England) Lynn	−1	−2	−2	−2	−2	−2	−3	−3	−3	−3	−4	−3	−3	−3	−3	−4	−5	−5
(United States) Bradley	+1	E	E	E	E	−1	−2	−2	−2	−2	−2	−3	−4	−4	−4	−4	−4	−4
(Sweden) Pettersson	−2	−2	−3	−4	−5	−5	−6	−6	−6	−5	−5	−5	−5	−5	−5	−4	−4	−4
(England) Poulter	−2	−3	−4	−5	−6	−6	−7	−6	−6	−6	−7	−8	−7	−6	−5	−5	−5	−4
(England) Rose	+1	E	−1	−1	E	E	−1	−2	−2	−2	−2	−2	−3	−4	−4	−5	−4	−4
(United States) Woods	−2	−3	−3	−3	−3	−3	−4	−4	−4	−4	−3	−3	−3	−3	−3	−2	−2	−2

Cumulative tournament scores, relative to par

Birdie	Bogey	Double bogey
