= John Ralston Williams =

Canadian-American physician

John Ralston Williams (December 27, 1874 – December 27, 1965) was a Canadian-American physician who was an instrumental figure in the public health of Rochester, New York.

Williams was born in Renfrew, Ontario, one of nine children of a baker. After several moves, the family settled in Rochester when Williams was a teenager.

Despite not finishing high school, and a series of miscellaneous jobs as a young adult, Williams wanted to be a doctor. He saved his money, and he eventually was accepted at the University of Michigan at the age of 25. He graduated in 1903 at the top of his class. Armed with his medical degree, he opened an office in Rochester in 1904.

One of his early successes was an extensive study into the safety of milk supplies in Rochester. He found that many homes had insufficient refrigeration, and suppliers were using inefficient methods of distribution. Although Rochester never fully adopted his suggestions, his study was influential nationally in the effort to improve refrigeration standards.

By 1916, he had been appointed chief of medicine at Highland Hospital, where he spearheaded the establishment of the first hospital division dedicated to the study of diabetes and other metabolic disorders. In 1922, Williams became the first American physician to administer insulin, ordering a supply from Frederick Banting in Toronto. Williams' patient was James D. Havens, aged 22, who would go on to become a well-known woodcut artist. Havens was the second American to receive insulin treatment, the first to do so without traveling to Canada.

Williams would remain at Highland for thirty years; during those years, and after stepping down, he was also a force in Rochester civic life. In 1932, for instance, he took a strong interest in the then-fledgling Rochester Municipal Museum. He joined and chaired the Rochester Museum Association, an organization formed to ensure the museum's survival. In 1935, after the effort was successful, he became chairman of the Municipal Museum Commission, remaining in that position until just a few years before his death. The museum later became the Rochester Museum and Science Center, and Williams was chairman of the committee that oversaw the design and erection of the museum's current building on East Avenue.

Williams was also responsible for placing tens of thousands of oak and other trees at the current site of Oak Hill Country Club, when the country club moved from Oak Hill near the Genesee River to a new space in Pittsford (in a land swap with the University of Rochester). The land had been farmed-out when the swap occurred, and while Williams didn't design the courses, he did extensive research into trees and which ones would thrive best in the local climate; many, if not most, of the majestic oaks that today make Oak Hill's courses so challenging and scenic were grown from seedlings in Williams' back yard.

Williams had two sons by his wife Ethel.
