= Oak Hill Country Club =

Country club in Pittsford, New York

Coordinates: 43.113°N 77.533°W

- Location in the United States Location in New York

Club information
- Location: Pittsford, New York, U.S.
- Established: 1901; 125 years ago
- Type: Private
- Total holes: 36
- Website: oakhillcc.com

East Course
- Designed by: Donald Ross; Andrew Green (2019 renovation)
- Par: 70
- Length: 7,390 yards (6,757 m)
- Course rating: 77.3
- Slope rating: 153

West Course
- Designed by: Donald Ross
- Par: 70
- Length: 6,735 yards (6,158 m)
- Course rating: 73.3
- Slope rating: 136
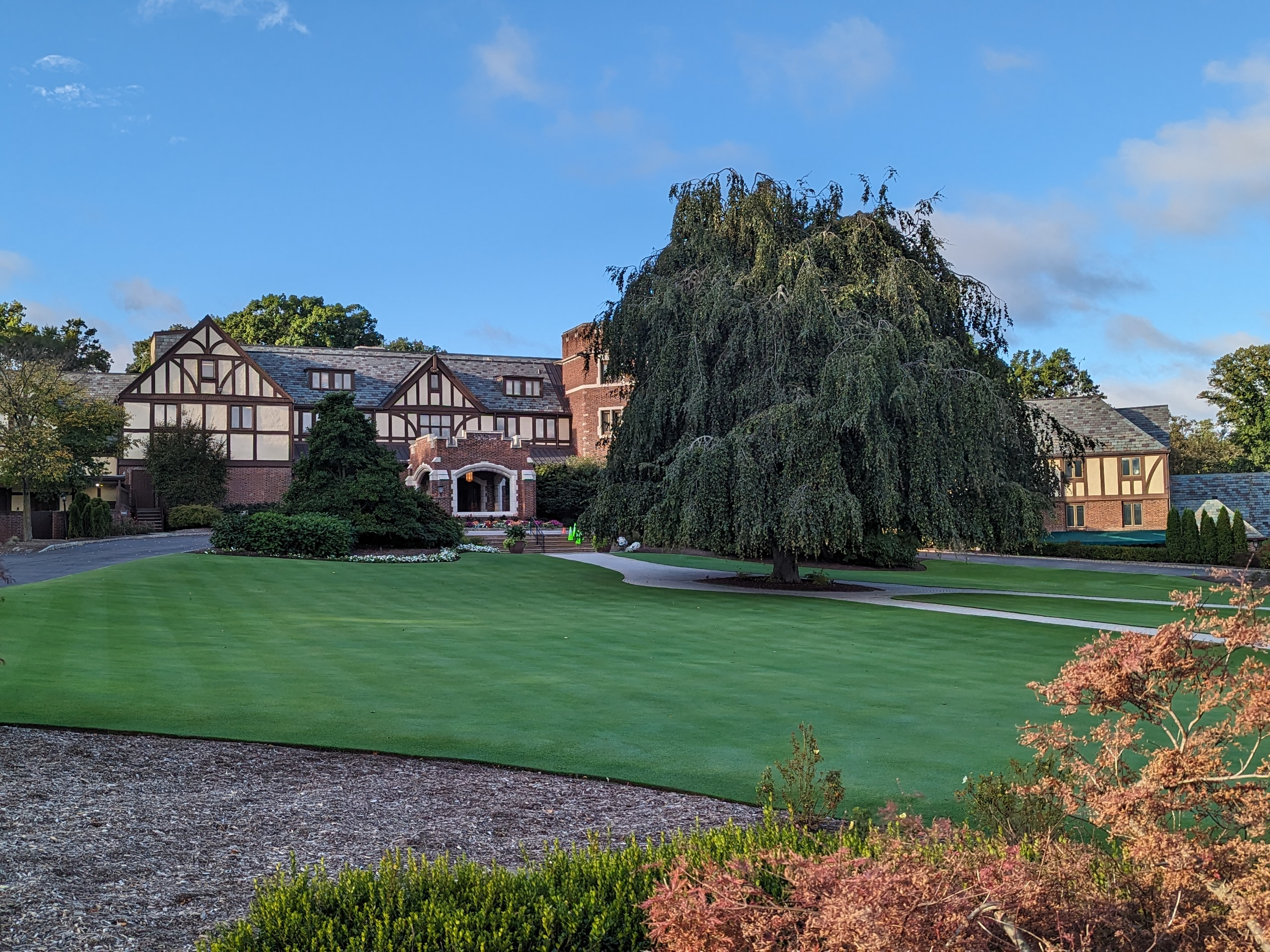
- Oak Hill Country Club clubhouse in October 2023.

Oak Hill Country Club is a country club in Pittsford, New York, United States, a suburb southeast of Rochester. Founded in 1901, and best known for its East golf course, the club has hosted multiple major championships. The club facilities are listed on the National Register of Historic Places.

== History ==
The club has a rich history of golf, starting out in 1901 as only 9 holes on 85 acres (0.34 km^{2}) on the banks of the Genesee River in Rochester. The clubhouse was no more than a converted farm house. At the time, golf was a relatively new sport in America, and as popularity of the sport grew, so did the country club.

By 1921, Oak Hill had doubled in size and had a new clubhouse, so when the University of Rochester proposed a land swap in 1921, it was a tough decision for members. However, the country club decided to take the university up on their offer, and moved the club to a 355-acre (1.44 km^{2}) plot in nearby Pittsford.

This decision ended up benefiting Oak Hill, the University of Rochester, and the City of Rochester. Now with triple the land of the old country club, Oak Hill had room for two 18-hole courses. Designed by Donald Ross, they became the East Course and the West Course. Local physician and civic personality John Ralston Williams cultivated and planted tens of thousands of oak trees among the fairways and roughs on what once was a farmed-out field.

=== East Course ===
The East Course — which hosts the major tournaments — is built around the east branch of Allen Creek, which currently acts as a lateral hazard on 8 of its 18 holes. It has had several changes made over the years - first by Robert Trent Jones Sr. in the early 1960s, later (and more recently for the 1989 Open and 2003 PGA) by Tom Fazio and his design group and finally by Andrew Green who completed a restoration project in 2019.

In 1941, the Rochester Times-Union, a local paper at the time, posted a $5,000 purse which attracted the greatest golfers in the world, including names such as Sam Snead, Walter Hagen, and Ben Hogan. This tournament, won by Snead, put Oak Hill on the national golf map. Several prestigious tournaments were held at Oak Hill over the next 78 years, including seven men's major championships – including three U.S. Opens and four PGA Championships, as well as the Ryder Cup.

In 2019, the East Course was ranked 22nd in Golf Digest's list of America's 100 Greatest Golf Courses.

== Scorecards ==
East Course
Tee	Rating/Slope	1	2	3	4	5	6	7	8	9	Out	10	11	12	13	14	15	16	17	18	In	Total
Championship	M:77.3 / 153	460	405	230	615	180	500	460	430	480	3,760	430	245	400	625	320	160	460	500	490	3,630	7,390
Par	Championship	4	4	3	5	3	4	4	4	4	35	4	3	4	5	4	3	4	4	4	35	70
Black	M:75.5 / 146	440	405	210	570	180	460	430	430	420	3,545	430	190	370	595	320	160	440	500	445	3,450	6,995
Blue	M:74.0 / 141 W:80.9 / 155	430	375	175	550	160	440	415	420	400	3,365	410	175	370	565	320	150	430	465	405	3,290	6,655
White	M:71.6 / 138 W:78.5 / 150	380	350	165	470	145	385	400	375	390	3,060	410	165	360	490	310	135	415	455	395	3,135	6,195
Gold	M:69.0 / 130 W:74.4 / 143	380	350	165	470	120	305	360	255	345	2,750	335	165	360	490	310	120	360	385	320	2,845	5,595
Green	M:67.2 / 127 W:72.2 / 139	380	300	135	470	100	305	360	255	345	2,650	335	115	290	460	245	105	360	385	320	2,615	5,265
Par	Men	4	4	3	5	3	4	4	4	4	35	4	3	4	5	4	3	4	5	4	36	71
SI	Men	5	11	15	13	17	1	3	9	7		8	16	10	2	12	18	6	14	4
Par	Women	5	4	3	5	3	4	4	4	4	36	4	3	4	5	4	3	4	5	4	36	72
SI	Women	13	5	11	9	17	3	1	15	7		4	14	10	2	12	18	6	16	8

West Course
Tee	Rating/Slope	1	2	3	4	5	6	7	8	9	Out	10	11	12	13	14	15	16	17	18	In	Total
Black	M:73.3 / 136	370	465	420	190	385	545	450	155	365	3,345	400	490	305	445	210	415	460	210	455	3,390	6,735
Blue	M:71.2 / 133 W:78.1 / 149	360	425	400	140	375	530	435	145	350	3,160	375	465	290	405	190	405	445	190	425	3,190	6,350
White	M:68.2 / 129 W:74.2 / 137	350	365	340	130	370	445	375	135	290	2,800	365	445	290	325	170	320	375	175	370	2,855	5,655
Gold	M:67.8 / 129 W:73.6 / 137	350	365	335	130	370	445	375	135	290	2,795	365	435	275	325	170	320	375	140	370	2,775	5,570
Green	M:66.4 / 125 W:72.1 / 131	350	335	335	80	325	445	375	80	290	2,615	365	395	275	325	105	320	375	140	370	2,670	5,285
Family	M:60.2 / 100 W:61.7 / 106	210	225	240	80	230	260	270	80	165	1,760	220	275	180	185	105	210	275	140	215	1,805	3,565
Par	Men	4	4	4	3	4	5	4	3	4	35	4	5	4	4	3	4	4	3	4	35	70
SI	Men	5	11	15	13	17	1	3	9	7		8	16	10	2	12	18	6	14	4
Par	Women	4	4	4	3	4	5	5	3	4	36	4	5	4	4	3	4	5	3	4	36	72

== Major tournaments hosted ==
All played on the East Course.

Year	Tournament	Winner	Winning score	Margin of victory	Runner(s)-up
1949	U.S. Amateur	(United States) Charles Coe	11 & 10		(United States) Rufus King
**1956**	U.S. Open	(United States) Cary Middlecoff	281 (+1)	1 stroke	(United States) Ben Hogan (United States) Julius Boros
**1968**	U.S. Open (2)	(United States) Lee Trevino	275 (–5)	4 strokes	(United States) Jack Nicklaus
**1980**	PGA Championship	(United States) Jack Nicklaus	274 (–6)	7 strokes	(United States) Andy Bean
1984	U.S. Senior Open	(United States) Miller Barber	286 (+6)	2 strokes	(United States) Arnold Palmer
**1989**	U.S. Open (3)	(United States) Curtis Strange	278 (–2)	1 stroke	(United States) Chip Beck (United States) Mark McCumber (Wales) Ian Woosnam
1995	Ryder Cup	Europe	14½ to 13½		United States
1998	U.S. Amateur (2)	(United States) Hank Kuehne	2 & 1		(United States) Tom McKnight
**2003**	PGA Championship (2)	(United States) Shaun Micheel	276 (–4)	2 strokes	(United States) Chad Campbell
2008	Senior PGA Championship	(United States) Jay Haas	287 (+7)	1 stroke	(Germany) Bernhard Langer
**2013**	PGA Championship (3)	(United States) Jason Dufner	270 (–10)	2 strokes	(United States) Jim Furyk
2019	Senior PGA Championship (2)	(United States) Ken Tanigawa	277 (–3)	1 stroke	(United States) Scott McCarron
**2023**	PGA Championship (4)	(United States) Brooks Koepka	271 (–9)	2 strokes	(United States) Scottie Scheffler (Norway) Viktor Hovland

Note: bolded years indicate modern era major championships.

The course record of 63 was set by Jason Dufner in the second round of the 2013 PGA Championship.

=== Future events ===
Year	Tournament
2027	U.S. Amateur (3)
2035	PGA Championship (5)
2037	U.S. Women's Open
