= 1956 U.S. Open (golf) =

Coordinates: 43.113°N 77.533°W

Tournament information
- Dates: June 14–16, 1956
- Location: Rochester, New York
- Course(s): Oak Hill Country Club; East Course
- Organized by: USGA
- Tour: PGA Tour

Statistics
- Par: 70
- Length: 6,902 yards (6,311 m)
- Field: 159 players, 51 after cut
- Cut: 149 (+9)
- Prize fund: $24,000
- Winner's share: $6,000

Champion
- (United States) Cary Middlecoff
- 281 (+1)

Location in the United States
Location in New York

The 1956 U.S. Open was the 56th U.S. Open, held June 14–16 at the East Course of Oak Hill Country Club near Rochester, New York. Cary Middlecoff won his second U.S. Open title, one stroke ahead of runners-up Julius Boros and Ben Hogan, both former champions.

Middlecoff began the final round with a two-stroke lead over Hogan, Ted Kroll, and Wes Ellis. After an erratic finish where he bogeyed 16 and 17, he carded a third consecutive round of even-par 70 to post a 281 (+1) total and waited. Hogan, pursuing his record fifth U.S. Open, had a chance to tie Middlecoff but missed a 4-foot (1.2 m) par putt on the 17th to finish one back. Boros also had a chance to catch Middlecoff, but missed a 15-foot (4.5 m) birdie on the last and also finished a stroke behind. The last contender on the course, Kroll led by a stroke after a birdie at the 14th hole, but immediately followed it with a bogey and triple bogey and finished four strokes back.

Reigning British Open champion Peter Thomson made a rare appearance in the United States and finished tied for fourth, his best finish at any other major. He was the 36-hole leader by a stroke over Hogan, but fell back after a four-over 39 on the back nine in the third round. Thomson won five British Opens, and his third consecutive (1954–56) came three weeks later at Royal Liverpool.

Several future champions made their mark at this U.S. Open. Arnold Palmer, 26, recorded the first of his thirteen top ten finishes at the U.S. Open, six strokes back in seventh place. Ken Venturi captured low-amateur honors in eighth place, two months after he lost a four-stroke lead at The Masters with an 80 in the final round. Billy Casper, 24, made his major championship debut and finished 14th.

Defending champion Jack Fleck, who upset Hogan in a Sunday playoff the year before at Olympic, shot 76-74 and missed the cut by a stroke. Jack Burke Jr., winner of the Masters two months earlier, also missed with a 152.

A record-setting 13,914 were in attendance for the final two rounds on Saturday.

This was the first of three U.S. Opens at the East Course at Oak Hill; Lee Trevino won in 1968 and Curtis Strange successfully defended in 1989. It also hosted the PGA Championship in 1980, 2003, and 2013, and the Ryder Cup in 1995.

== Course layout ==
Hole	1	2	3	4	5	6	7	8	9	Out	10	11	12	13	14	15	16	17	18	In	Total
Yards	445	390	208	571	440	170	423	432	416	3,495	420	192	380	602	327	133	441	463	449	3,407	6,902
Par	4	4	3	5	4	3	4	4	4	35	4	3	4	5	4	3	4	4	4	35	70

== Round summaries ==
=== First round ===
Thursday, June 14, 1956

Place	Player	Score	To par
1	(United States) Bob Rosburg	68	−2
2	(Australia) Peter Thomson	70	E
T3	(Wales) Errie Ball	71	+1
T3	(United States) Julius Boros	71	+1
T3	(United States) Wes Ellis	71	+1
T3	(United States) Doug Ford	71	+1
T3	(United States) Ed Furgol	71	+1
T3	(United States) Jay Hebert	71	+1
T3	(United States) Cary Middlecoff	71	+1
T10	(United States) Jerry Barber	72	+2
T10	(United States) Al Brosch	72	+2
T10	(United States) Dave Douglas	72	+2
T10	(United States) Fred Haas	72	+2
T10	(United States) Dutch Harrison	72	+2
T10	(United States) Ben Hogan	72	+2
T10	(United States) Bill Hyndman (a)	72	+2
T10	(United States) Ted Kroll	72	+2
T10	(United States) Billy Maxwell	72	+2
T10	(United States) Arnold Palmer	72	+2
T10	(United States) Bud Taylor (a)	72	+2

=== Second round ===
Friday, June 15, 1956

Place	Player	Score	To par
1	(Australia) Peter Thomson	70-69=139	−1
2	(United States) Ben Hogan	72-68=140	E
T3	(United States) Jerry Barber	72-69=141	+1
T3	(United States) Wes Ellis	71-70=141	+1
T3	(United States) Ed Furgol	71-70=141	+1
T3	(United States) Cary Middlecoff	71-70=141	+1
T7	(United States) Julius Boros	71-71=142	+2
T7	(United States) Ted Kroll	72-70=142	+2
T7	(United States) Arnold Palmer	72-70=142	+2
T10	(United States) Fred Haas	72-71=143	+3
T10	(United States) Billy Maxwell	72-71=143	+3
T10	(United States) Bud Taylor (a)	72-71=143	+3

Amateurs: Taylor (+3), Ward (+7), Hyndman (+8), Patton (+8), Venturi (+8), Garrett (+9), Magee (+10), Ervasti (+11), Rodgers (+11), Simmons (+11), Dahlbender (+12), Holland (+12), Croonquist (+15), Shields (+16), Kuntz (+17), Moore Jr (+18), Aldrich (+19), Dixon (+20), Kelly (+23), Beman (+24), Myers (+25), Kleist (+27), Deal (+30), Watson (+34), Mandeville (+35), Brownell (WD).

=== Third round ===
Saturday, June 16, 1956 (morning)

Place	Player	Score	To par
1	(United States) Cary Middlecoff	71-70-70=211	+1
T2	(United States) Wes Ellis	71-70-71=212	+2
T2	(United States) Ben Hogan	72-68-72=212	+2
T2	(United States) Ted Kroll	72-70-70=212	+2
5	(United States) Julius Boros	71-71-71=213	+3
T6	(United States) Ed Furgol	71-70-73=214	+4
T6	(United States) Arnold Palmer	72-70-72=214	+4
T6	(Australia) Peter Thomson	70-69-75=214	+4
T9	(United States) Jerry Barber	72-69-74=215	+5
T9	(United States) Fred Haas	72-71-72=215	+5

=== Final round ===
Saturday, June 16, 1956 (afternoon)

Place	Player	Score	To par	Money ($)
1	(United States) Cary Middlecoff	71-70-70-70=281	+1	6,000
T2	(United States) Julius Boros	71-71-71-69=282	+2	2,650
T2	(United States) Ben Hogan	72-68-72-70=282	+2	2,650
T4	(United States) Ed Furgol	71-70-73-71=285	+5	1,033
T4	(United States) Ted Kroll	72-70-70-73=285	+5	1,033
T4	(Australia) Peter Thomson	70-69-75-71=285	+5	1,033
7	(United States) Arnold Palmer	72-70-72-73=287	+7	600
8	(United States) Ken Venturi (a)	77-71-68-73=289	+9	0
T9	(United States) Jerry Barber	72-69-74-75=290	+10	416
T9	(United States) Wes Ellis	71-70-71-78=290	+10	416
T9	(United States) Doug Ford	71-75-70-74=290	+10	416

Amateurs: Venturi (+9), Patton (+12), Taylor (+18), Hyndman (+20), Ward (+25), Garrett (+29).
