= 1980 PGA Championship =

Tournament information
- Dates: August 7–10, 1980
- Location: Rochester, New York; 43.113°N 77.533°W
- Courses: Oak Hill Country Club, East Course
- Organized by: PGA of America
- Tour: PGA Tour

Statistics
- Par: 70
- Length: 6,964 yards (6,368 m)
- Field: 150 players, 77 after cut
- Cut: 149 (+9)
- Prize fund: $376,400
- Winner's share: $60,000

Champion
- (United States) Jack Nicklaus
- 274 (−6)

Location map
- Location in the United States Location in New York

The 1980 PGA Championship was the 62nd PGA Championship, held August 7–10 at the East Course of Oak Hill Country Club in Rochester, New York. Jack Nicklaus won his fifth PGA Championship, seven strokes ahead of runner-up Andy Bean. The victory tied Nicklaus with Walter Hagen, who won five PGA titles in match play competition in the 1920s.

It was the 17th of 18 major titles for the 40-year-old Nicklaus, and his second of the year: he won the U.S. Open two months earlier. The previous season in 1979 had been Nicklaus' worst, with no tour wins for the first time in his career. His next and final major title came nearly six years later, at the Masters in 1986.

After 36 holes, Nicklaus was at 139 (−1), a stroke behind leader Gil Morgan. Nicklaus fired a 66 (−4) on Saturday to move to 205 (−5) and a three-shot lead over Lon Hinkle heading into the final round, with Morgan three more back at 211 in third. Nicklaus was as low as six-under for the round through fourteen holes, but struggled on the last four, and alternated bogeys with scrambling pars. Sunday was less eventful as Hinkle and Morgan fell back and Nicklaus carded a one-under 69 for a runaway win, uncommon for a major.

Since changing to stroke play in 1958, the largest victory margin at the PGA Championship had been four strokes, in 1966 and 1973, the latter also won by Nicklaus. His seven stroke margin in 1980 remained the record until 2012, when Rory McIlroy won by eight.

Nicklaus became the third to win both the U.S. Open and PGA Championship in the same year, joining Gene Sarazen (1922) and Ben Hogan (1948). Tiger Woods later won both in 2000, part of his "Tiger Slam, and Brooks Koepka also accomplished this feat in 2018.

This was the third major championship at the East Course, which previously hosted the U.S. Open in 1956 and 1968, when Nicklaus was the runner-up to Lee Trevino. The U.S. Open later returned in 1989 and the PGA Championship in 2003, 2013, and 2023. The course also hosted the Ryder Cup in 1995.

== Course layout ==
| Hole | 1 | 2 | 3 | 4 | 5 | 6 | 7 | 8 | 9 | Out | 10 | 11 | 12 | 13 | 14 | 15 | 16 | 17 | 18 | In | Total |
|---|---|---|---|---|---|---|---|---|---|---|---|---|---|---|---|---|---|---|---|---|---|
| Yards | 447 | 410 | 206 | 570 | 419 | 175 | 432 | 430 | 425 | 3,514 | 432 | 195 | 374 | 596 | 325 | 178 | 440 | 458 | 452 | 3,450 | 6,964 |
| Par | 4 | 4 | 3 | 5 | 4 | 3 | 4 | 4 | 4 | 35 | 4 | 3 | 4 | 5 | 4 | 3 | 4 | 4 | 4 | 35 | 70 |

== Round summaries ==
=== First round ===
Thursday, August 7, 1980

| Place | Player | Score | To par |
|---|---|---|---|
| 1 | (United States) Craig Stadler | 67 | −3 |
| T2 | (United States) Gil Morgan | 68 | −2 |
| T2 | (United States) Bob Murphy | 68 | −2 |
| T2 | (United States) Curtis Strange | 68 | −2 |
| T2 | (United States) Howard Twitty | 68 | −2 |
| T2 | (United States) Bobby Walzel | 68 | −2 |
| T7 | (United States) Ben Crenshaw | 69 | −1 |
| T7 | (Australia) David Graham | 69 | −1 |
| T7 | (United States) Hale Irwin | 69 | −1 |
| T10 | (United States) George Archer | 70 | E |
| T10 | (United States) Lee Elder | 70 | E |
| T10 | (United States) Raymond Floyd | 70 | E |
| T10 | (United States) Bob Gilder | 70 | E |
| T10 | (United States) Morris Hatalsky | 70 | E |
| T10 | (United States) Lon Hinkle | 70 | E |
| T10 | (United States) Hale Irwin | 70 | E |
| T10 | (United States) Johnny Miller | 70 | E |
| T10 | (Japan) Tōru Nakamura | 70 | E |
| T10 | (United States) Jack Nicklaus | 70 | E |
| T10 | (United States) Jack Renner | 70 | E |

=== Second round ===
Friday, August 8, 1980

| Place | Player | Score | To par |
|---|---|---|---|
| 1 | (United States) Gil Morgan | 68-70=138 | −2 |
| 2 | (United States) Lon Hinkle | 70-69=139 | −1 |
| 2 | (United States) Jack Nicklaus | 70-69=139 | −1 |
| 4 | (United States) Curtis Strange | 68-72=140 | E |
| 5 | (United States) Johnny Miller | 70-71=141 | +1 |
| T6 | (United States) Dave Eichelberger | 72-70=142 | +2 |
| T6 | (United States) Gary Koch | 71-71=142 | +2 |
| T6 | (United States) Artie McNickle | 71-71=142 | +2 |
| T6 | (United States) Andy North | 72-70=142 | +2 |
| T6 | (United States) Bill Rogers | 71-71=142 | +2 |
| T6 | (United States) Craig Stadler | 67-75=142 | +2 |
| T6 | (United States) Howard Twitty | 68-74=142 | +2 |

=== Third round ===
Saturday, August 9, 1980

| Place | Player | Score | To par |
|---|---|---|---|
| 1 | (United States) Jack Nicklaus | 70-69-66=205 | −5 |
| 2 | (United States) Lon Hinkle | 70-69-69=208 | −2 |
| T3 | (United States) Andy Bean | 72-71-68=211 | +1 |
| T3 | (United States) Gil Morgan | 68-70-73=211 | +1 |
| T5 | (United States) Terry Diehl | 72-72-68=212 | +2 |
| T5 | (United States) Curtis Strange | 68-72-72=212 | +2 |
| 7 | (United States) Howard Twitty | 68-74-71=213 | +3 |
| 8 | (United States) Bill Rogers | 71-71-72=214 | +4 |
| T9 | (United States) Andy North | 72-70-73=215 | +5 |
| T9 | (United States) Jerry Pate | 72-73-70=215 | +5 |
| T9 | (United States) Bobby Walzel | 68-76-71=216 | +5 |

=== Final round ===
Sunday, August 10, 1980

| Place | Player | Score | To par | Money ($) |
|---|---|---|---|---|
| 1 | (United States) Jack Nicklaus | 70-69-66-69=274 | −6 | 60,000 |
| 2 | (United States) Andy Bean | 72-71-68-70=281 | +1 | 40,000 |
| T3 | (United States) Lon Hinkle | 70-69-69-75=283 | +3 | 22,500 |
| T3 | (United States) Gil Morgan | 68-70-73-72=283 | +3 | 22,500 |
| T5 | (United States) Curtis Strange | 68-72-72-72=284 | +4 | 14,500 |
| T5 | (United States) Howard Twitty | 68-74-71-71=284 | +4 | 14,500 |
| 7 | (United States) Lee Trevino | 74-71-71-69=285 | +5 | 11,000 |
| T8 | (United States) Bill Rogers | 71-71-72-72=286 | +6 | 8,500 |
| T8 | (United States) Bobby Walzel | 68-76-71-71=286 | +6 | 8,500 |
| T10 | (United States) Terry Diehl | 72-72-68-76=288 | +8 | 6,000 |
| T10 | (United States) Peter Jacobsen | 71-73-74-70=288 | +8 | 6,000 |
| T10 | (United States) Jerry Pate | 72-73-70-73=288 | +8 | 6,000 |
| T10 | (United States) Tom Watson | 75-74-72-67=288 | +8 | 6,000 |
| T10 | (United States) Tom Weiskopf | 71-73-72-72=288 | +8 | 6,000 |
