= 1968 U.S. Open (golf) =

Coordinates: 43.113°N 77.533°W

Tournament information
- Dates: June 13–16, 1968
- Location: Rochester, New York
- Course(s): Oak Hill Country Club; East Course
- Organized by: USGA
- Tour: PGA Tour

Statistics
- Par: 70
- Length: 6,962 yards (6,366 m)
- Field: 149 players, 64 after cut
- Cut: 148 (+8)
- Prize fund: $188,800
- Winner's share: $30,000

Champion
- (United States) Lee Trevino
- 275 (−5)

Location in the United States
Location in New York

The 1968 U.S. Open was the 68th U.S. Open, held June 13–16 at the East Course of Oak Hill Country Club in Rochester, New York. Lee Trevino equaled the tournament scoring record and won the first of his six major titles, four strokes ahead of runner-up Jack Nicklaus. It was also the first win on the PGA Tour for Trevino, age 28.

This was the second of three U.S. Opens at the East Course; Cary Middlecoff won the first in 1956 and Curtis Strange successfully defended in 1989. It also hosted the PGA Championship in 1980, 2003, and 2013, and the Ryder Cup in 1995.

== Final round ==
Bert Yancey held the 54-hole lead after a tournament record 205 (−5) in the first three rounds. Trevino was a stroke behind at 206, after three rounds in the 60s, and made par saves at 5 and 6. After Yancey bogeyed the 5th, Trevino took the lead, then recorded birdies at 11 and 12, while Yancey bogeyed the 11th to fall out of contention. Nicklaus started the round seven strokes back at 212 (+2); he got two quick birdies, but did not record another until the 14th, by which time Trevino already had a commanding lead. Trevino's total of 275 tied the tournament record that Nicklaus established the year before at Baltusrol; his four rounds in the 60s was a tournament first, and did not happen again for a quarter century, until Lee Janzen won at Baltusrol in 1993. It was also the first of Trevino's 29 victories on the PGA Tour. Of Trevino's six major victories, Nicklaus was the runner-up four times.

Sam Snead, age 56, finished in a tie for 9th place, his final top-10 finish at the U.S. Open.

== Round summaries ==
=== First round ===
Thursday, June 13, 1968

Place	Player	Score	To par
1	(United States) Bert Yancey	67	−3
T2	(United States) Charles Coody	69	−1
T2	(United States) Lee Trevino	69	−1
T4	(Canada) Al Balding	70	E
T4	(United States) Don Bies	70	E
T4	(United States) Billy Farrell	70	E
T4	(United States) John Felus	70	E
T4	(United States) Labron Harris Jr.	70	E
T4	(United States) Dave Marr	70	E
T10	(United States) Julius Boros	71	+1
T10	(United States) Gay Brewer	71	+1
T10	(United States) Bill Collins	71	+1
T10	(Australia) Bruce Devlin	71	+1
T10	(United States) Gardner Dickinson	71	+1
T10	(United States) Don January	71	+1
T10	(United States) Dick Siderowf (a)	71	+1
T10	(United States) Dan Sikes	71	+1
T10	(United States) Larry Ziegler	71	+1

=== Second round ===
Friday, June 14, 1968

Place	Player	Score	To par
1	(United States) Bert Yancey	67-68=135	−5
2	(United States) Lee Trevino	69-68=137	−3
T3	(United States) Don Bies	70-70=140	E
T3	(United States) Charles Coody	69-71=140	E
T3	(Australia) Bruce Devlin	71-69=140	E
T3	(United States) Jerry Pittman	73-67=140	E
T7	(United States) Miller Barber	74-68=142	+2
T7	(United States) Julius Boros	71-71=142	+2
T7	(United States) Gay Brewer	71-71=142	+2
T7	(New Zealand) Bob Charles	73-69=142	+2
T7	(United States) Billy Farrell	70-72=142	+2
T7	(United States) Labron Harris Jr.	70-72=142	+2
T7	(United States) Dave Hill	74-68=142	+2
T7	(United States) Dave Marr	70-72=142	+2
T7	(United States) Jack Nicklaus	72-70=142	+2
T7	(United States) Dan Sikes	71-71=142	+2
T7	(United States) Larry Ziegler	71-71=142	+2

=== Third round ===
Saturday, June 15, 1968

Place	Player	Score	To par
1	(United States) Bert Yancey	67-68-70=205	−5
2	(United States) Lee Trevino	69-68-69=206	−4
T3	(United States) Charles Coody	69-71-72=212	+2
T3	(United States) Jack Nicklaus	72-70-70=212	+2
T5	(United States) Julius Boros	71-71-71=213	+3
T5	(United States) Bobby Nichols	74-71-68=213	+3
T7	(United States) Billy Casper	75-68-71=214	+4
T7	(New Zealand) Bob Charles	73-69-72=214	+4
T7	(United States) Al Geiberger	72-74-68=214	+4
T7	(United States) Jerry Pittman	73-67-74=214	+4
T7	(United States) Dave Stockton	72-73-69=214	+4

=== Final round ===
Sunday, June 16, 1968

Place	Player	Score	To par	Money ($)
1	(United States) Lee Trevino	69-68-69-69=275	−5	30,000
2	(United States) Jack Nicklaus	72-70-70-67=279	−1	15,000
3	(United States) Bert Yancey	67-68-70-76=281	+1	10,000
4	(United States) Bobby Nichols	74-71-68-69=282	+2	7,500
T5	(United States) Don Bies	70-70-75-69=284	+4	5,500
T5	(United States) Steve Spray	73-75-71-65=284	+4	5,500
T7	(New Zealand) Bob Charles	73-69-72-71=285	+5	3,750
T7	(United States) Jerry Pittman	73-67-74-71=285	+5	3,750
T9	(United States) Gay Brewer	71-71-75-69=286	+6	2,516
T9	(United States) Billy Casper	75-68-71-72=286	+6	2,516
T9	(Australia) Bruce Devlin	71-69-75-71=286	+6	2,516
T9	(United States) Al Geiberger	72-74-68-72=286	+6	2,516
T9	(United States) Sam Snead	73-71-74-68=286	+6	2,516
T9	(United States) Dave Stockton	72-73-69-72=286	+6	2,516

==== Scorecard ====
Hole	1	2	3	4	5	6	7	8	9	10	11	12	13	14	15	16	17	18
Par	4	4	3	5	4	3	4	4	4	4	3	4	5	4	3	4	4	4
(United States) Trevino	−3	−3	−3	−3	−3	−3	−3	−3	−3	−3	−4	−5	−5	−5	−5	−5	−5	−5
(United States) Nicklaus	+2	+2	+1	E	E	E	E	E	E	E	E	E	E	−1	−1	−1	−1	−1
(United States) Yancey	−4	−4	−3	−3	−2	−3	−3	−3	−2	−1	−1	−1	E	−1	−1	E	E	+1
(United States) Nichols	+3	+3	+3	+3	+3	+3	+3	+3	+3	+3	+3	+2	+2	+2	+2	+1	+1	+2
(United States) Bies	+5	+6	+6	+5	+5	+5	+5	+5	+5	+4	+4	+4	+4	+5	+4	+4	+4	+4
(United States) Spray	+9	+10	+9	+8	+8	+7	+8	+9	+9	+8	+8	+7	+7	+6	+5	+4	+4	+4

Cumulative tournament scores, relative to par

Birdie	Bogey
