= David Lynn (golfer) =

English professional golfer (born 1973)

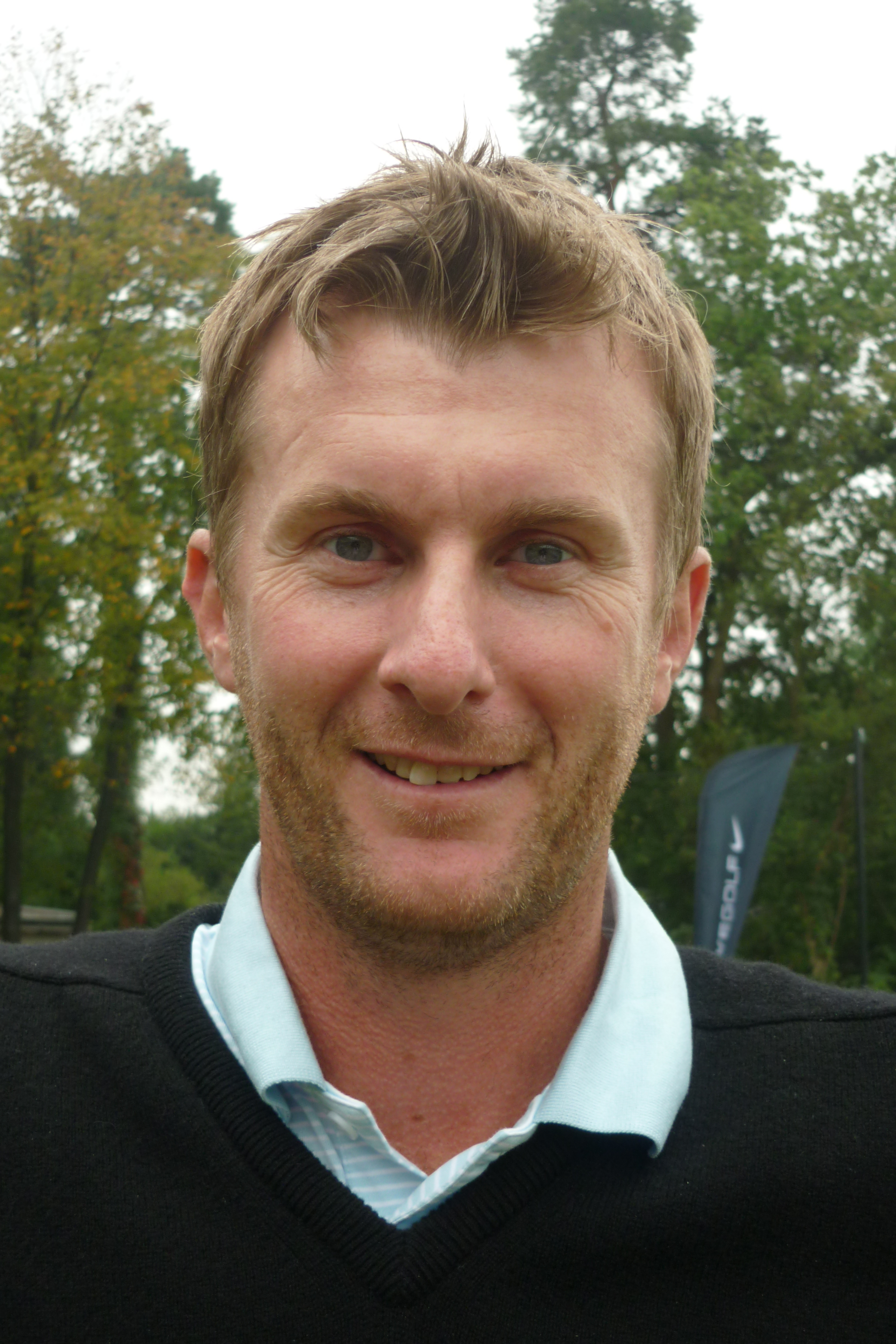

Personal information
- Full name: David Anthony Lynn
- Nationality: England
- Born: 20 October 1973 (age 53) Billinge, Wigan, England
- Height: 6 ft 3 in (1.91 m)
- Weight: 178 lb (81 kg; 12.7 st)

Career
- Sport: Golf
- Turned professional: 1995
- Current tour: European Tour
- Former tour: PGA Tour
- Professional wins: 3
- Highest ranking: 34 (13 October 2013)

Number of wins by tour
- European Tour: 2
- Challenge Tour: 1

Best results in major championships
- Masters Tournament: T46: 2013
- PGA Championship: 2nd: 2012
- U.S. Open: DNP
- The Open Championship: T53: 2003

David Anthony Lynn (born 20 October 1973) is an English professional golfer who played mainly on the European Tour, but took up full-time membership on the PGA Tour for the 2013 season.

== Career ==
Lynn won the 1994 Greek Amateur Championship, where he finished eight shots ahead of David Howell.

In 1995, Lynn turned professional. He won three times in his professional career. His best European Tour Order of Merit finish was 18th in 2012, and he reached number 34 on the Official World Golf Ranking in 2013.

He notably finished second in the 2012 PGA Championship, eight strokes behind winner Rory McIlroy on five under par after consecutive rounds of 68 over the weekend. This was only his second appearance in a major championship and the result ensured a return to next year's PGA Championship, as well as a first ever visit to the Masters Tournament. He also moved up to a career high ranking of 40th.

On the back of his runner-up finish at the 2012 PGA Championship and having earned enough money as a non-member, Lynn joined the PGA Tour full-time for the 2013 season. Lynn came close to earning his first PGA Tour victory in May 2013 at the Wells Fargo Championship. He finished regulation play at eight-under-par, tied with American rookie Derek Ernst. However, Lynn lost on the first sudden-death playoff hole to an Ernst par, after hitting his second shot into a greenside bunker and was unable to get up-and-down for par.

In October 2013, Lynn won the Portugal Masters, shooting a final-round of 63 to win his first European Tour title in nine years. He retired after the 2014 season, suffering from tendonitis in his right elbow.

== Amateur wins ==
- 1994 Greek Amateur Open Championship

== Professional wins (3) ==
=== European Tour wins (2) ===
No.	Date	Tournament	Winning score	Margin of victory	Runner(s)-up
1	8 Aug 2004	KLM Open	−16 (63-70-65-66=264)	3 strokes	(Australia) Richard Green, (Republic of Ireland) Paul McGinley
2	13 Oct 2013	Portugal Masters	−18 (65-65-73-63=266)	1 stroke	(South Africa) Justin Walters

European Tour playoff record (0–1)

No.	Year	Tournament	Opponent	Result
1	2010	Austrian Golf Open	(Spain) José Manuel Lara	Lost to par on first extra hole

=== Challenge Tour wins (1) ===
No.	Date	Tournament	Winning score	Margin of victory	Runner-up
1	22 Jun 1997	Team Erhverv Danish Open	−14 (70-66-69-69=274)	3 strokes	(Netherlands) Robert-Jan Derksen

== Playoff record ==
PGA Tour playoff record (0–1)

No.	Year	Tournament	Opponent	Result
1	2013	Wells Fargo Championship	(United States) Derek Ernst	Lost to par on first extra hole

== Results in major championships ==
Tournament	2003	2004	2005	2006	2007	2008	2009	2010	2011	2012	2013	2014
Masters Tournament											T46	CUT
The Open Championship	T53										CUT	
PGA Championship										2	T22	

Top 10
Did not play

CUT = missed the half-way cut
"T" = tied
Note: Lynn never played in the U.S. Open.

== Results in The Players Championship ==
Tournament	2013
The Players Championship	T26

"T" indicates a tie for a place

== Results in World Golf Championships ==
Tournament	2012	2013	2014
Match Play		R64	R64
Championship		T39	
Invitational		T53	T69
Champions	T69	T39	

Did not play

QF, R16, R32, R64 = Round in which player lost in match play
"T" = Tied

== Team appearances ==
Amateur

- European Youths' Team Championship (representing England): 1994

Professional

- Seve Trophy (representing Great Britain & Ireland): 2013
