= Jason Dufner =

American professional golfer (born 1977)

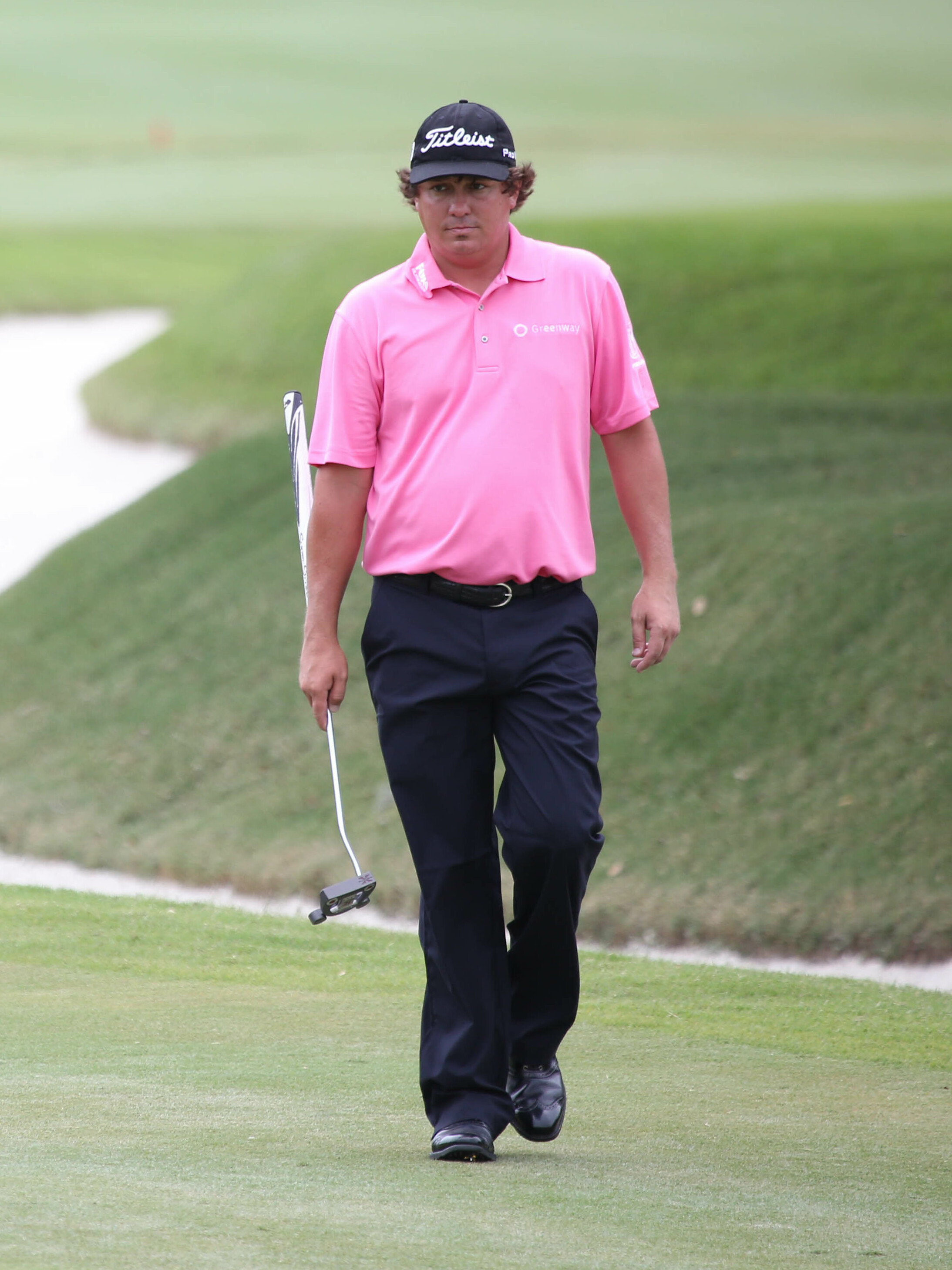
- Dufner at the 2014 Players Championship

Personal information
- Full name: Jason Christopher Dufner
- Nickname: Duf
- Nationality: United States
- Born: March 24, 1977 (age 49) Cleveland, Ohio, U.S.
- Height: 5 ft 10 in (1.78 m)
- Weight: 180 lb (82 kg; 13 st)
- Spouse: Amanda Boyd (2012–15)

Career
- Sport: Golf
- College: Auburn University
- Turned professional: 2000
- Current tours: PGA Tour (past champion status)
- Former tour: Nationwide Tour
- Professional wins: 8
- Highest ranking: 6 (September 16, 2012)

Number of wins by tour
- PGA Tour: 5
- Korn Ferry Tour: 2
- Other: 1

Best results in major championships (wins: 1)
- Masters Tournament: T20: 2013
- PGA Championship: Won: 2013
- U.S. Open: T4: 2012, 2013
- The Open Championship: T14: 2017

Jason Christopher Dufner (born March 24, 1977) is an American professional golfer who plays on the PGA Tour where he is a five-time winner. He has won one major championship, the 2013 PGA Championship. He was also runner-up in the 2011 PGA Championship, losing a playoff to Keegan Bradley. Dufner was ranked in the top 10 in the Official World Golf Ranking for 50 weeks; his career-high ranking is sixth in September 2012.

== Early life ==
Dufner was born in Cleveland, Ohio. He moved to the Washington, D.C. area when he was 11 years old, and then to Fort Lauderdale, Florida, when he was 14. It was there that he started playing golf, and played for St. Thomas Aquinas High School during his sophomore, junior, and senior years.

== Amateur career ==
Dufner was a walk-on at Auburn University, where he won three times in his college career and was an Honorable Mention All-American in 1997. He graduated from Auburn in 2000 with a degree in economics.

In 1998, Dufner played in the finals of the U.S. Amateur Public Links at Torrey Pines, falling to Trevor Immelman, 3 and 2. The 1998 U.S. Amateur was the first tournament with his long time caddie, Kevin Baile.

== Professional career ==
In his early career, Dufner struggled to hold down a place on the PGA Tour. He was a member of the PGA Tour in 2004 and the Nationwide Tour in 2001, 2002, 2003, 2005 and 2006. Dufner won two events during his time on the Nationwide Tour, the Buy.com Wichita Open in 2001 and the LaSalle Bank Open in 2006. He finished in 8th place on the Nationwide Tour money list in 2006 to earn his PGA Tour card for 2007. He finished 127th in the FedEx Cup standings in 2007, and failed to qualify at the PGA Tour Q-School, where he finished T149. He retained conditional status for the 2008 PGA Tour season, and then finished T11 at the Q-School that year to earn his card for 2009. He has been a member of the PGA Tour every year since. In 2009, Dufner finished in the top-10 on six occasions, including a third-place finish at the RBC Canadian Open, and a runner up place at the Deutsche Bank Championship, part of the FedEx Cup playoffs. As a result, Dufner went on to finish the year 11th in the FedEx Cup standings and 33rd on the year's money list.

Dufner had a less successful 2010 season, recording only two top-10 finishes. However, his best finish of the year came in a major championship, at the 2010 PGA Championship at Whistling Straits. He finished in a tie for fifth place, two strokes short of the playoff. He was eliminated in the third FedEx Cup playoff event and did not qualify for The Tour Championship.

=== 2011 ===
Early in 2011, Dufner had a chance to win his first PGA Tour title at the Waste Management Phoenix Open at TPC Scottsdale when he finished tied for the lead at 18-under-par after 72 holes, before eventually losing in a playoff to Mark Wilson. Wilson made a birdie on the second extra hole and the best Dufner could manage there was a par. He also had a good finish in the Zurich Classic of New Orleans where a final-round 66 boosted him to a tie for third place. Dufner earned entry into the 2011 U.S. Open after Anders Hansen withdrew; previously during a qualifying tournament in Georgia, Dufner had lost in a playoff to Russell Henley. He also played in the 2011 Open Championship as a result of Tiger Woods pulling out due to injury. He missed the cut in both the U.S. Open and the Open Championship.

==== 2011 PGA Championship near miss ====
At the 2011 PGA Championship in Atlanta, Dufner was in contention to win his first major and maiden PGA Tour title, when he entered the final round in the last group and tied for the lead with Brendan Steele at seven under par. Dufner completed the front nine in 33, two under par, while playing partner Steele dropped four shots early on and fell out of contention. Dufner held the lead for most of the final round and was bogey-free through 14 holes. After his nearest challenger, Keegan Bradley, made triple bogey on the 15th, Dufner had a five-stroke advantage with four holes to play. Dufner then hit his tee shot on 15 into the water hazard right of the green on the par three. He got up and down from the drop zone to make bogey, but followed this with bogeys at 16 and 17. Meanwhile, Bradley scored back-to-back birdies on 16 and 17 to take the clubhouse lead at eight under, wiping out Dufner's advantage. Dufner parred the 18th and the two American players went into a three-hole aggregate playoff.

On the first playoff hole, both players hit their approach shots to 16 within a few feet. Bradley made his birdie putt, while Dufner missed his birdie, allowing Bradley to take a one-stroke advantage to the 17th. Both players found the green from the tee, and while Bradley two-putted for his par, Dufner knocked his first putt well past the hole, and three-putted the green to fall two strokes behind with one to play. At the last hole, Bradley's second shot cleared the water by a few yards; Dufner then followed with a shot on the same line and made his birdie putt. Bradley only needed to two-putt for the championship, which he did. This was Dufner's best major finish, winning $865,000 of the purse, with both of his career high finishes in majors coming at the PGA Championship. With his second-place finish, he rose to 38th in the Official World Golf Ranking (OWGR).

=== 2012 ===
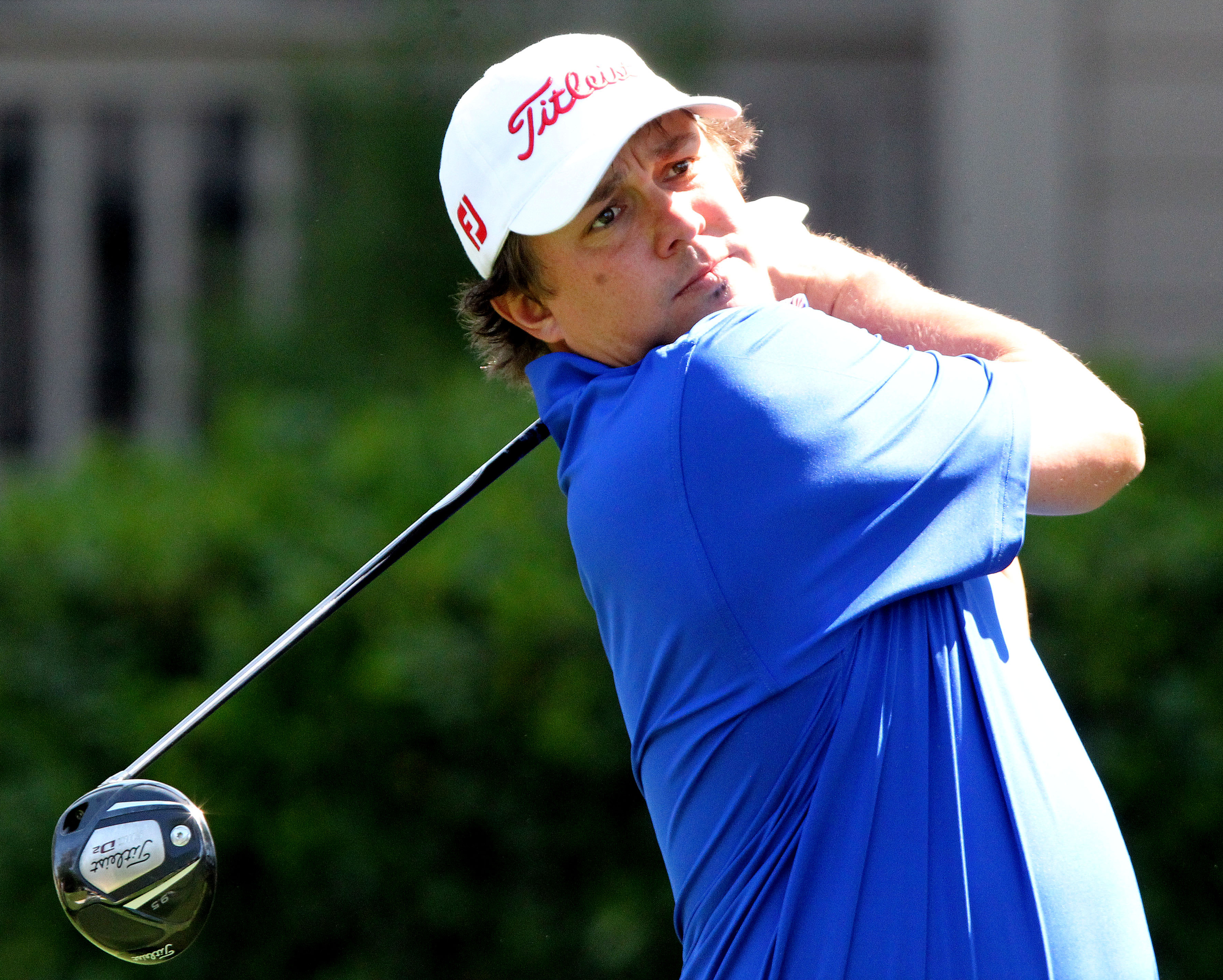
Dufner in 2012

Dufner continued his good form in 2012 by sharing the 36-hole lead at the Masters, but faded on the weekend to finish T24. Three weeks later at the Zurich Classic of New Orleans, Dufner won for the first time on the PGA Tour in his 164th start when he defeated Ernie Els on the second hole of a sudden death playoff. He entered the final round with a two stroke advantage and shot a 70 to finish at 19 under par, a tournament total record, which Els also equalled. At the first playoff hole, the 18th, Els had a chance to clinch victory with a six-foot putt, but pushed it out to the right. Replaying the 18th again, Dufner found the green in two and when Els couldn't get up and down from 100 yards short of the green, Dufner sealed the win with a two putt. Dufner moved into the world's top 20 as a result of his first victory.

Three weeks later Dufner chalked up his second victory with a win at the HP Byron Nelson Championship by one stroke over Dicky Pride, who was seeking his first win since 1994. Dufner began the final round with the 54-hole lead, but suffered setbacks when he bogeyed two and three to surrender the lead. He recovered with birdies at four, five and seven, but remained behind playing partner J. J. Henry until the 17th when Henry made double bogey. Now tied for the lead with Pride, the clubhouse leader, after 71 holes, Dufner sank a 25-foot birdie putt on the 72nd hole for the outright victory. The win elevated Dufner to 14th in the OWGR and first in the FedEx Cup standings. Dufner became only the second multiple winner on the PGA Tour in 2012, alongside Hunter Mahan.

In May 2012, Dufner had an opportunity to win his third PGA Tour title of the year at the Colonial, where he was leading after 36 and 54 holes respectively before being beaten by one stroke by former Masters champion Zach Johnson. The second-place finish, however, catapulted Dufner to 8th place in the Official World Golf Ranking, a career best ranking at the time.

Dufner's excellent season continued at the 2012 U.S. Open where he finished in a tie for fourth place, two strokes behind winner Webb Simpson. This is his best finish to date in the U.S. Open.

Dufner qualified for his first Ryder Cup team in 2012, finishing with a record of 3–1 in the three day matches, including a 2-up win over Peter Hanson in the singles competition.

=== 2013 ===
In January 2013, Dufner stated an interest in taking up a membership with the European Tour.

In June 2013, Dufner finished fourth at the U.S. Open at Merion Golf Club, the second year in a row finishing fourth at the tournament. Dufner entered the final round at +8, but birdied five of the first 14 holes to pull to +3 overall. However, he triple-bogeyed the par-4 15th hole to move back to +6. After a birdie at 16, Dufner scored par on holes 17 and 18 to finish the tournament at +5, four shots behind the leader, Justin Rose.

==== 2013 PGA Championship victory ====
At the PGA Championship in August, Dufner won his maiden major championship with a two-stroke victory at Oak Hill Country Club in Rochester, New York. After beginning the tournament with a two-under round of 68, Dufner tied the record for all-time lowest round in a major and broke the course record at Oak Hill Country Club by shooting a seven-under-par 63 in the second round. He carded five birdies and an eagle, the latter achieved when he holed out from 105 yards on the par-4 2nd hole. Dufner had the chance to finish with a 62 and the outright lowest round in a major, but he left his 12-foot putt for birdie at the 18th hole short. The record-breaking round took Dufner into a two-shot lead going into the weekend. In round three, Dufner shot a one-over round of 71 to fall out of the lead, one stroke behind Jim Furyk. That marked the second time in three years that Dufner was in the final group of the PGA Championship on Sunday.

In the final round, Dufner started well by making a birdie at the 4th hole, which took him into a share of the lead alongside Furyk. Further birdies at the 5th and 8th holes, allied with Furyk bogeying the 9th, opened up a two-stroke advantage for Dufner entering the back nine. He missed a birdie putt on the 10th which would have moved him three strokes ahead and then holed a short putt on the 11th which almost lipped out for par. Having turned into a two-man race, both Dufner and Furyk made four straight pars between the 12th and 15th holes. On the 16th, Dufner stiffed his approach to within 18 inches, but Furyk holed a lengthy birdie putt to stay in touch. After both players bogeyed the 17th, Dufner held a two-stroke lead going up the final hole. Both players found the rough with their drives and approach shots and after Furyk could only manage a bogey, Dufner lagged his par putt down to the hole to tap in, finishing 10 under par for the tournament and a two-stroke victory. Dufner moved back inside the top ten, at 8th in the rankings, after the victory.

=== 2016 ===
In January 2016, Dufner won his fourth PGA Tour title at the CareerBuilder Challenge at PGA West. This ended a 2 1/2-year winless drought since his 2013 PGA Championship victory. He defeated David Lingmerth in a sudden-death playoff after both players finished four shots clear of the field at 25-under-par. Lingmerth had a chance to win on the first playoff hole, but could not hole his birdie putt from 20 feet and Dufner had to hole a 10-foot putt for par, meaning the players returned to the 18th for the second extra hole. After finding the light rough with his tee shot, Lingmerth hooked his second shot into the water on the left, allowing Dufner to comfortably finish the hole and take the title.

=== 2017 ===
On June 4, 2017, Dufner won the Memorial Tournament.

=== 2018 ===
In the 2018 PGA Tour season, Dufner did not win a tournament. He won $1,497,655 and finished 80th on the money list.

== Personal life ==
On May 5, 2012, Dufner married his girlfriend Amanda Boyd, whom he had met in 2009 through mutual friends at Auburn. They were divorced in early 2015.

Dufner's laid-back mannerisms have led to the term "Dufnering," which specifically refers to a slumped sitting position with an expressionless face. The term originated in March 2013 after a photo went public of Dufner slumping without expression while visiting a youth center in Irving, Texas. Afterward, Keegan Bradley and several other professional golfers good-naturedly mocked Dufner through Twitter and other social media, and "Dufnering" rapidly became a popular phenomenon.

Dufner founded Jason Dufner's Charitable Foundation, a nonprofit organization based in Auburn, Alabama, committed to ending child hunger in Lee County, Alabama.

In November 2017, Dufner got into a Twitter dispute with Golf Channel analyst Brandel Chamblee after Chamblee had reportedly offended Dufner's swing coach Chuck Cook. Chamblee ended up blocking Dufner due to the latter's use of profanities.

== Professional wins (8) ==
=== PGA Tour wins (5) ===
Legend
Major championships (1)
Other PGA Tour (4)

No.	Date	Tournament	Winning score	To par	Margin of victory	Runner(s)-up
1	Apr 29, 2012	Zurich Classic of New Orleans	67-65-67-70=269	−19	Playoff	(South Africa) Ernie Els
2	May 20, 2012	HP Byron Nelson Championship	67-66-69-67=269	−11	1 stroke	(United States) Dicky Pride
3	Aug 11, 2013	PGA Championship	68-63-71-68=270	−10	2 strokes	(United States) Jim Furyk
4	Jan 24, 2016	CareerBuilder Challenge	64-65-64-70=263	−25	Playoff	(Sweden) David Lingmerth
5	Jun 4, 2017	Memorial Tournament	65-65-77-68=275	−13	3 strokes	(United States) Rickie Fowler, (India) Anirban Lahiri

PGA Tour playoff record (2–3)

No.	Year	Tournament	Opponent	Result
1	2011	Waste Management Phoenix Open	(United States) Mark Wilson	Lost to birdie on second extra hole
2	2011	PGA Championship	(United States) Keegan Bradley	Lost three-hole aggregate playoff; Bradley: −1 (3-3-4=10), Dufner: E (4-4-3=11)
3	2012	Zurich Classic of New Orleans	(South Africa) Ernie Els	Won with birdie on second extra hole
4	2014	Crowne Plaza Invitational at Colonial	(Australia) Adam Scott	Lost to birdie on third extra hole
5	2016	CareerBuilder Challenge	(Sweden) David Lingmerth	Won with par on second extra hole

=== Nationwide Tour wins (2) ===
No.	Date	Tournament	Winning score	To par	Margin of victory	Runner(s)-up
1	Jul 15, 2001	Buy.com Wichita Open	67-67-64-68=266	−22	3 strokes	(United States) David Gossett, (United States) Jeff Gove, (United States) Todd Rose
2	Jun 11, 2006	LaSalle Bank Open	69-71-69-70=279	−5	1 stroke	(United States) Cliff Kresge

=== Other wins (1) ===
No.	Date	Tournament	Winning score	To par	Margin of victory	Runners-up
1	Dec 12, 2015	Franklin Templeton Shootout (with (United States) Brandt Snedeker)	61-64-61=186	−30	2 strokes	(United States) Harris English and (United States) Matt Kuchar

== Major championships ==
=== Wins (1) ===
Year	Championship	54 holes	Winning score	Margin	Runner-up
2013	PGA Championship	1 shot deficit	−10 (68-63-71-68=270)	2 strokes	(United States) Jim Furyk

=== Results timeline ===
Results not in chronological order in 2020.

Tournament	2001	2002	2003	2004	2005	2006	2007	2008	2009
Masters Tournament									
U.S. Open	CUT					T40	62		
The Open Championship									
PGA Championship									CUT

Tournament	2010	2011	2012	2013	2014	2015	2016	2017	2018
Masters Tournament	T30		T24	T20	CUT	T49	CUT	T33	CUT
U.S. Open	T33	CUT	T4	T4	CUT	T18	T8	CUT	T25
The Open Championship	CUT	CUT	T31	T26	T51	T58	T22	T14	T51
PGA Championship	T5	2	T27	1	WD	T68	T60	T58	CUT

Tournament	2019	2020	2021	2022	2023	2024	2025	2026
Masters Tournament								
PGA Championship	CUT	CUT	CUT	CUT		CUT	CUT	CUT
U.S. Open	T35							
The Open Championship		NT						

Win
Top 10
Did not play

CUT = missed the half-way cut
"T" = tied
WD = withdrew
NT = no tournament due to COVID-19 pandemic

=== Summary ===
Tournament	Wins	2nd	3rd	Top-5	Top-10	Top-25	Events	Cuts made
Masters Tournament	0	0	0	0	0	2	8	5
PGA Championship	1	1	0	3	3	3	17	7
U.S. Open	0	0	0	2	3	5	13	9
The Open Championship	0	0	0	0	0	2	9	7
Totals	1	1	0	5	6	12	47	28

- Most consecutive cuts made – 9 (2011 PGA – 2013 PGA)
- Longest streak of top-10s – 1 (six times)

== Results in The Players Championship ==
Tournament	2009	2010	2011	2012	2013	2014	2015	2016	2017	2018	2019	2020	2021
The Players Championship	T32	CUT	T6	T68	T62	T48	CUT	T49	T60	T5	T74	C	CUT

Top 10

CUT = missed the halfway cut
"T" indicates a tie for a place
C = Canceled after the first round due to the COVID-19 pandemic

== Results in World Golf Championships ==
Results not in chronological order prior to 2015.

Tournament	2009	2010	2011	2012	2013	2014	2015	2016	2017	2018
Championship		T18		T29	T12	T9	T49	T11	T23	T55
Match Play				R64	R64	R16	T34	T38	T51	T17
Invitational				7	T4	T66		51	T50	
Champions	T40			T2	T34	T10				

Top 10
Did not play

QF, R16, R32, R64 = Round in which player lost in match play
"T" = tied

== PGA Tour career summary ==
Season	Wins (Majors)	Earnings (US$)	Rank
2004	0	317,770	164
2005	0	0	n/a
2006	0	29,459	n/a
2007	0	574,992	140
2008	0	284,138	184
2009	0	2,190,792	33
2010	0	1,121,695	80
2011	0	3,057,860	21
2012	2	4,869,304	4
2013	1 (1)	3,132,268	16
2014	0	1,651,491	61
2015	0	1,007,997	101
2016	1	2,879,884	30
2017	1	3,310,341	22
2018	0	1,497,655	80
2019	0	926,365	120
2020	0	306,781	162
Career*	5 (1)	27,158,790	51

* As of the 2020 season.

== U.S. national team appearances ==
Professional

- Ryder Cup: 2012
- Presidents Cup: 2013 (winners)

== See also ==
- 2003 Nationwide Tour graduates
- 2006 Nationwide Tour graduates
