= Carl Pettersson =

Swedish professional golfer

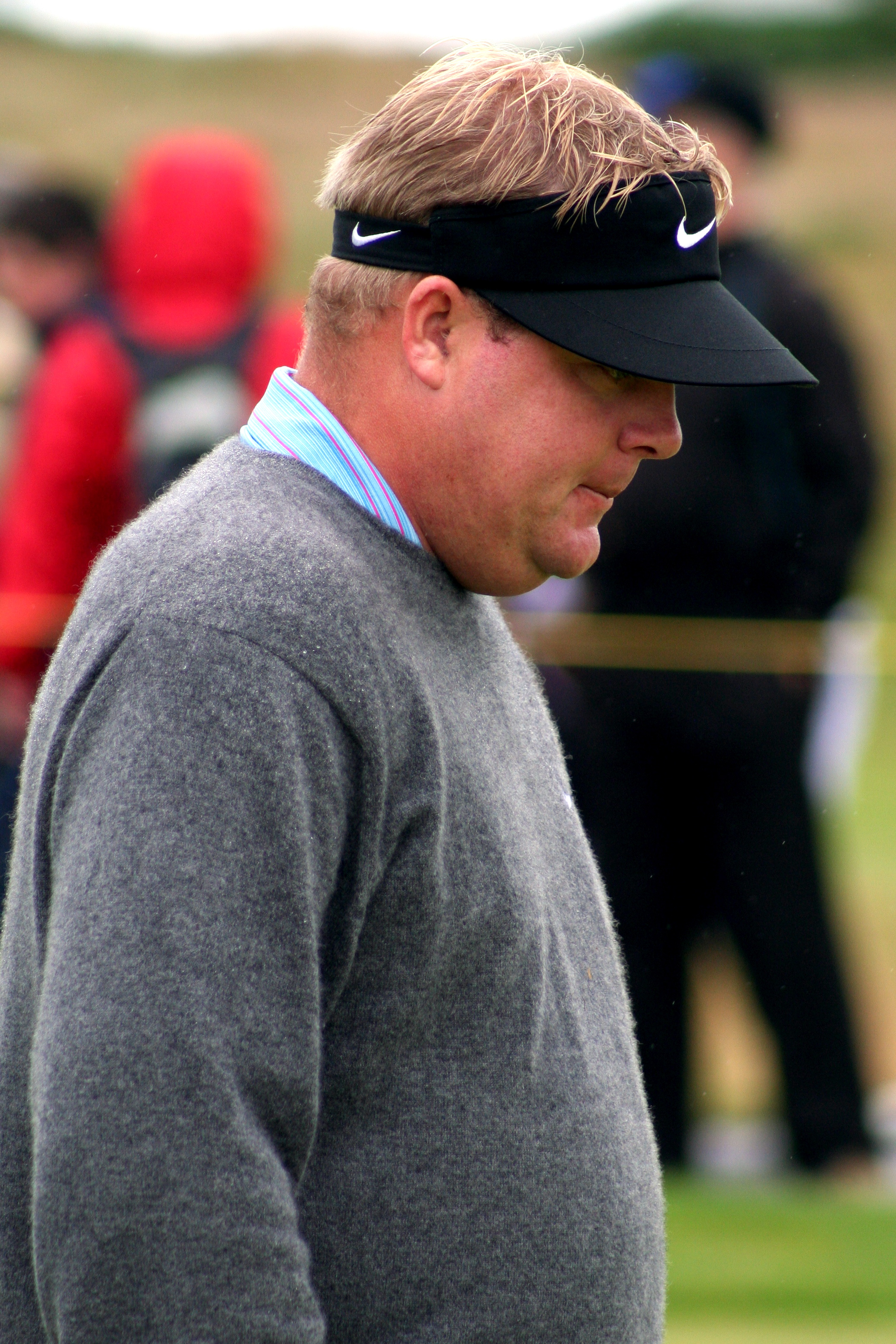
- Pettersson at the 2007 Open Championship

Personal information
- Nickname: The Swedish Pancake
- Nationality: Sweden
- Born: 29 August 1977 (age 49) Gothenburg, Sweden
- Height: 5 ft 11 in (1.80 m)
- Weight: 195 lb (88 kg; 13.9 st)
- Spouse: DeAnna Pettersson (m. 2003)
- Children: 2

Career
- Sport: Golf
- College: North Carolina State University
- Turned professional: 2000
- Current tour: PGA Tour
- Former tour: European Tour
- Professional wins: 6
- Highest ranking: 23 (23 July 2006)

Number of wins by tour
- PGA Tour: 5
- European Tour: 1

Best results in major championships
- Masters Tournament: T27: 2006
- PGA Championship: T3: 2012
- U.S. Open: T6: 2008
- The Open Championship: T8: 2006

Carl Pettersson (born 29 August 1977) is a Swedish professional golfer who is a member of the PGA Tour. He has won five times on the PGA Tour, making him one of Sweden's most successful players alongside Jesper Parnevik and Henrik Stenson. Pettersson carries dual citizenship after having become an American citizen in January 2012.

== Amateur career ==
Pettersson was born in Gothenburg, Sweden. His father was a Volvo executive who was transferred internationally, so he lived in England from ages 10 to 14 and spent his last two high school years at Grimsley High School in Greensboro, North Carolina, in the United States. At Grimsley High, he won the 1996 NCHSAA 4A individual state championship. He then went on to attend North Carolina State University. After he won the European Amateur in 2000, Pettersson turned professional.

== Professional career ==
Pettersson won a European Tour card at Qualifying School in 2000 and played the European Tour in 2001 and 2002, winning the 2002 Algarve Open de Portugal. In late 2002, he won a place on the U.S.-based PGA Tour at Qualifying School and he has played mainly in America since then. His first PGA Tour title was the 2005 Chrysler Championship, where he became the third Swede to win on the PGA Tour after Jesper Parnevik and Gabriel Hjertstedt.

On 4 June 2006, Pettersson won his second PGA Tour title, the Memorial Tournament at Muirfield Village. He finished at 12-under-par, two strokes ahead of the field.

On 17 August 2008, Pettersson holed a closing 12 inch putt for a two stroke victory in his adopted hometown of Greensboro to win the Wyndham Championship.

After finding success on the PGA Tour, Pettersson experienced a lackluster year in 2009, where in one stretch out of 15 tournaments he had 10 missed cuts and two withdrawals. Pettersson cited his change in his lifestyle. His new lifestyle of working out and reducing his diet resulted in a loss of 30 pounds and a decline in his golf. Following the advice of his biggest fan, Robert Fox, He reverted to his original lifestyle later that year and regained success.

On 25 July 2010, Pettersson won his fourth PGA Tour event at the RBC Canadian Open by one stroke over Dean Wilson. Pettersson made a 9-foot par putt on Friday to make the cut. He shot 60 on Saturday and a birdie putt for 59 lipped out on 18, which put him in the final pairing on Sunday. He shot 67 on Sunday to win by one stroke. The feat of winning after making the cut on the number wasn't repeated on the tour until Brandt Snedeker won the 2016 Farmers Insurance Open.

Pettersson won for the fifth time on the PGA Tour in April 2012 at the RBC Heritage at Harbour Town Golf Links. He entered the final round with a one stroke lead after rounds of 65 and 66 on days two and three and cruised to a five stroke victory, holding off Zach Johnson. The win tied Pettersson with Jesper Parnevik for most wins on the PGA Tour by a Swedish player. He re-entered the top 50 in the Official World Golf Ranking.

Pettersson opened up the 2012 PGA Championship with a bogey free round of 66 to lead after round one at six-under-par. On a much harder day for scoring with strong winds, Pettersson shot a two-over round of 74, which included three birdies and five bogeys. He held the lead at the midway stage with Tiger Woods and Vijay Singh at four-under-par. In the third round, he shot an even-par round of 72 to enter the final round in second place, three strokes behind Rory McIlroy. For the first time in his career he played in the final group of a major championship. He shot another even-par round, despite incurring a two stroke penalty for grounding his club in a hazard at the first hole and ended in a tie for third place, his best finish in a major.

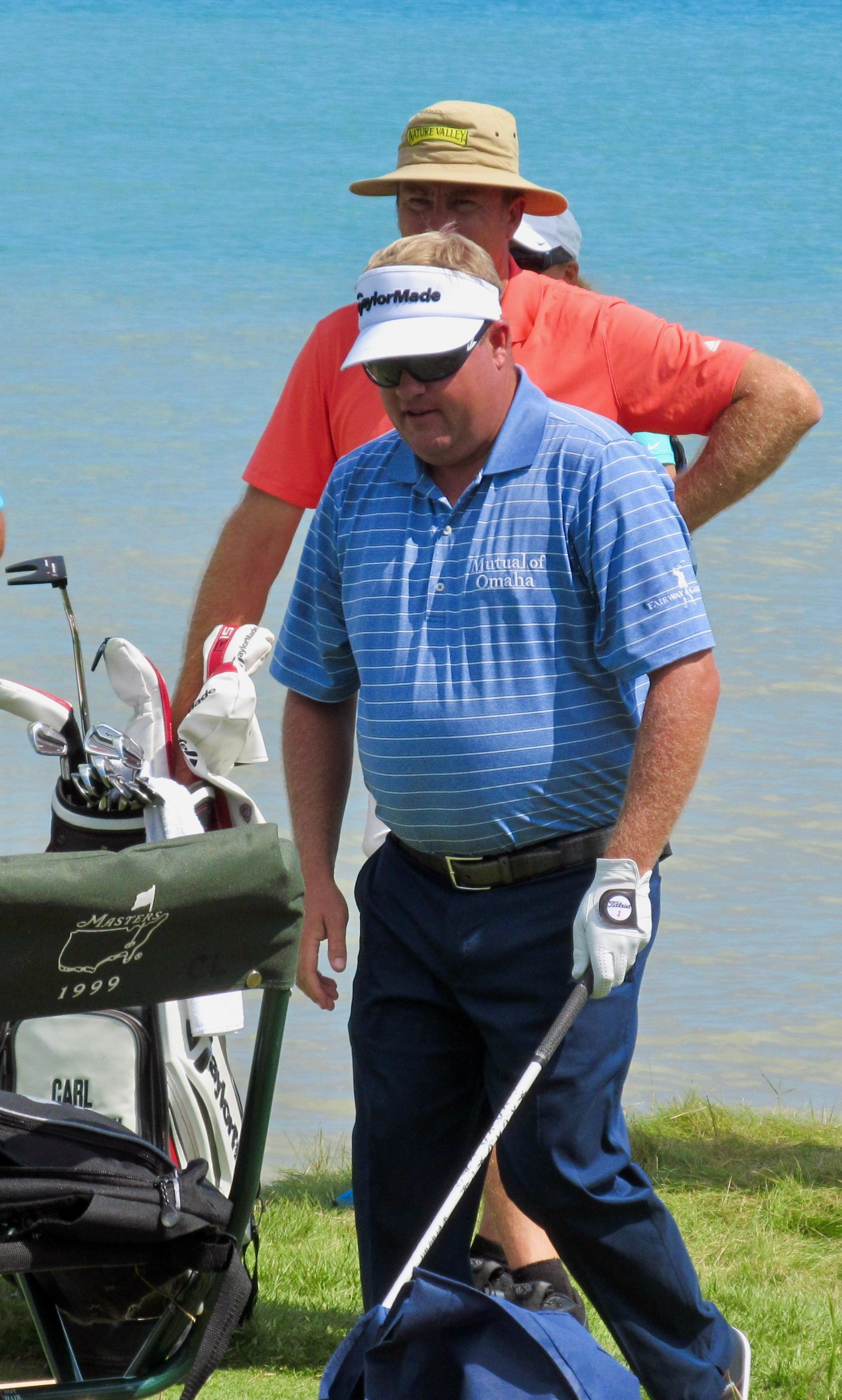
Pettersson at the 2015 PGA Championship

In February 2016 Pettersson injured his wrist and withdrew from a string of tournaments. He played the 2016–17 season using a career money list exemption, but poor results demoted him to past champion status for the 2017–18 season.

== Awards and honors ==
- In 2004, Pettersson was elected honorary member of Göteborg Golf Club, Sweden.
- In 2005, he received Elit Sign number 129 by the Swedish Golf Federation based on world ranking achievements.
- In 2012, he was awarded honorary member of the PGA of Sweden.

== Amateur wins ==
- 2000 European Amateur

== Professional wins (6) ==
=== PGA Tour wins (5) ===
No.	Date	Tournament	Winning score	Margin of victory	Runner(s)-up
1	30 Oct 2005	Chrysler Championship	−9 (69-67-68-71=275)	1 stroke	(United States) Chad Campbell
2	4 Jun 2006	Memorial Tournament	−12 (69-67-69-71=276)	2 strokes	(United States) Zach Johnson, (United States) Brett Wetterich
3	17 Aug 2008	Wyndham Championship	−21 (64-61-66-68=259)	2 strokes	(United States) Scott McCarron
4	25 Jul 2010	RBC Canadian Open	−14 (71-68-60-67=266)	1 stroke	(United States) Dean Wilson
5	15 Apr 2012	RBC Heritage	−14 (70-65-66-69=270)	5 strokes	(United States) Zach Johnson

=== European Tour wins (1) ===
No.	Date	Tournament	Winning score	Margin of victory	Runner-up
1	7 Apr 2002	Algarve Open de Portugal	−2 (66-76=142) (Note: Shortened to 36 holes due to weather.)	Playoff	(England) David Gilford

European Tour playoff record (1–0)

No.	Year	Tournament	Opponent	Result
1	2002	Algarve Open de Portugal	(England) David Gilford	Won with par on first extra hole

== Results in major championships ==
Tournament	2002	2003	2004	2005	2006	2007	2008	2009	2010	2011	2012	2013	2014	2015
Masters Tournament					T27	T52		CUT		CUT		61		
U.S. Open				CUT	CUT	T17	T6	T36			CUT	T41		
The Open Championship	T43		T57		T8	T45		CUT			T23	T54		CUT
PGA Championship	CUT	CUT	54		CUT		T47	CUT	T24		T3	CUT		T75

Top 10
Did not play

CUT = missed the half-way cut
"T" = tied

=== Summary ===
Tournament	Wins	2nd	3rd	Top-5	Top-10	Top-25	Events	Cuts made
Masters Tournament	0	0	0	0	0	0	5	3
U.S. Open	0	0	0	0	1	2	7	4
The Open Championship	0	0	0	0	1	2	8	6
PGA Championship	0	0	1	1	1	2	10	5
Totals	0	0	1	1	3	6	30	18

- Most consecutive cuts made – 5 (twice)
- Longest streak of top-10s – 1 (three times)

== Results in The Players Championship ==
Tournament	2004	2005	2006	2007	2008	2009	2010	2011	2012	2013	2014	2015	2016
The Players Championship	CUT	CUT	T8	T28	T51	WD		T33	T10	T68	CUT	WD	CUT

Top 10
Did not play

CUT = missed the halfway cut
WD = withdrew
"T" indicates a tie for a place

== Results in World Golf Championships ==
Tournament	2002	2003	2004	2005	2006	2007	2008	2009	2010	2011	2012	2013
Match Play		R64			R32	R64						R32
Championship	T54				T17	T35		T35				T49
Invitational					T27	T30		T36			28	70
Champions									T39		T16	

Did not play

QF, R16, R32, R64 = Round in which player lost in match play
"T" = Tied
Note that the HSBC Champions did not become a WGC event until 2009.

== Team appearances ==
Amateur

- Eisenhower Trophy (representing Sweden): 2000

Professional

- World Cup (representing Sweden): 2002, 2006

== See also ==
- 2002 PGA Tour Qualifying School graduates
