= 2003 PGA Championship =

Coordinates: 43.113°N 77.533°W

Tournament information
- Dates: August 14–17, 2003
- Location: Rochester, New York
- Course(s): Oak Hill Country Club, East Course
- Organized by: PGA of America
- Tour(s): PGA Tour; PGA European Tour; Japan Golf Tour

Statistics
- Par: 70
- Length: 7,134 yards (6,523 m)
- Field: 156 players, 70 after cut
- Cut: 148 (+8)
- Prize fund: $6,000,000 €5,254,309
- Winner's share: $1,080,000 €953,980

Champion
- (United States) Shaun Micheel
- 276 (−4)

Location in the United States
Location in New York

The 2003 PGA Championship was the 85th PGA Championship, held from August 14–17 at the East Course of Oak Hill Country Club near Rochester, New York. Shaun Micheel won his only major title, two strokes ahead of runner-up Chad Campbell. It was also the sole career win for Micheel on the PGA Tour, who was making his 164th PGA Tour start and was ranked 169th in the world at the start of the week.

This was the fifth major at the East Course, which previously hosted the PGA Championship in 1980, and the U.S. Open in 1956, 1968, and 1989. It also hosted the Ryder Cup in 1995; the PGA Championship returned in 2013 and 2023.

The first round was played during the Northeast blackout of 2003. Despite this, and a state of emergency in Monroe County, there was no interruption to play.

== Course layout ==
East Course

Hole	1	2	3	4	5	6	7	8	9	Out	10	11	12	13	14	15	16	17	18	In	Total
Yards	460	401	214	570	428	175	461	428	452	3,589	429	226	372	598	323	181	439	495	482	3,545	7,134
Par	4	4	3	5	4	3	4	4	4	35	4	3	4	5	4	3	4	4	4	35	70

Previous course lengths for major championships

- 6,902 yards (6,311 m) - par 70, 1989 U.S. Open
- 6,964 yards (6,368 m) - par 70, 1980 PGA Championship
- 6,962 yards (6,366 m) - par 70, 1968 U.S. Open
- 6,902 yards (6,311 m) - par 70, 1956 U.S. Open

== Round summaries ==
=== First round ===
Thursday, August 14, 2003

Place	Player	Score	To par
T1	(United States) Phil Mickelson	66	−4
T1	(Australia) Rod Pampling	66	−4
3	(United States) Billy Andrade	67	−3
T4	(United States) Lee Janzen	68	−2
T4	(Canada) Mike Weir	68	−2
T6	(Australia) Aaron Baddeley	69	−1
T6	(United States) Chad Campbell	69	−1
T6	(United States) Fred Funk	69	−1
T6	(United States) Tim Herron	69	−1
T6	(United States) Shaun Micheel	69	−1
T6	(Fiji) Vijay Singh	69	−1
T6	(United States) Kevin Sutherland	69	−1

=== Second round ===
Friday, August 15, 2003

Place	Player	Score	To par
1	(United States) Shaun Micheel	69-68=137	−3
T2	(United States) Billy Andrade	67-72=139	−1
T2	(Canada) Mike Weir	68-71=139	−1
4	(Australia) Rod Pampling	66-74=140	E
T5	(United States) Chad Campbell	69-72=141	+1
T5	(Argentina) José Cóceres	73-68=141	+1
T5	(South Africa) Ernie Els	71-70=141	+1
T5	(United States) Tim Herron	69-72=141	+1
T5	(United States) Phil Mickelson	66-75=141	+1
T5	(United States) Tom Pernice Jr.	70-71=141	+1
T5	(Australia) Adam Scott	72-69=141	+1

=== Third round ===
Saturday, August 16, 2003

Place	Player	Score	To par
T1	(United States) Chad Campbell	69-72-65=206	−4
T1	(United States) Shaun Micheel	69-68-69=206	−4
3	(Canada) Mike Weir	68-71-70=209	−1
4	(South Africa) Tim Clark	72-70-68=210	E
T5	(United States) Billy Andrade	67-72-72=211	+1
T5	(United States) Briny Baird	73-71-67=211	+1
T5	(Germany) Alex Čejka	74-69-68=211	+1
T5	(South Africa) Ernie Els	71-70-70=211	+1
T9	(United States) Fred Funk	69-73-70=212	+2
T9	(United States) Charles Howell III	70-72-70=212	+2
T9	(Fiji) Vijay Singh	69-73-70=212	+2

=== Final round ===
Sunday, August 17, 2003

Place	Player	Score	To par	Money ($)
1	(United States) Shaun Micheel	69-68-69-70=276	−4	1,080,000
2	(United States) Chad Campbell	69-72-65-72=278	−2	648,000
3	(South Africa) Tim Clark	72-70-68-69=279	−1	408,000
4	(Germany) Alex Čejka	74-69-68-69=280	E	288,000
T5	(South Africa) Ernie Els	71-70-70-71=282	+2	214,000
T5	(United States) Jay Haas	70-74-69-69=282	+2	214,000
T7	(United States) Fred Funk	69-73-70-72=284	+4	175,667
T7	(United States) Loren Roberts	70-73-70-71=284	+4	175,667
T7	(Canada) Mike Weir	68-71-70-75=284	+4	175,667
T10	(United States) Billy Andrade	67-72-72-74=285	+5	135,500
T10	(Sweden) Niclas Fasth	76-70-71-68=285	+5	135,500
T10	(United States) Charles Howell III	70-72-70-73=285	+5	135,500
T10	(United States) Kenny Perry	75-72-70-68=285	+5	135,500

==== Scorecard ====
Final round

Hole	1	2	3	4	5	6	7	8	9	10	11	12	13	14	15	16	17	18
Par	4	4	3	5	4	3	4	4	4	4	3	4	5	4	3	4	4	4
(United States) Micheel	−5	−4	−4	−4	−4	−5	−4	−3	−3	−3	−3	−3	−3	−4	−3	−4	−3	−4
(United States) Campbell	−3	−3	−3	−3	−3	−2	−1	−1	−1	−1	−1	−1	−2	−1	−2	−2	−2	−2
(South Africa) Clark	−1	−2	−2	−3	−2	−3	−3	−3	−3	−2	−1	E	−1	−1	E	−1	−1	−1
(Germany) Čejka	+1	+1	+1	E	E	E	E	E	E	E	E	+1	E	E	E	−1	E	E
(South Africa) Els	+1	+1	+1	E	E	+1	+2	+1	E	+1	+1	+2	+2	+2	+2	+2	+2	+2
(United States) Haas	+3	+3	+4	+4	+4	+3	+3	+3	+2	+3	+3	+3	+3	+3	+3	+3	+2	+2
(Canada) Weir	E	+1	+2	+3	+4	+4	+4	+3	+2	+2	+2	+2	+2	+3	+3	+3	+5	+4
(United States) Andrade	+2	+2	+2	+2	+3	+4	+5	+5	+6	+6	+5	+5	+4	+3	+3	+3	+4	+5
(United States) Howell	+3	+3	+3	+4	+4	+3	+3	+3	+4	+4	+4	+4	+4	+4	+5	+5	+5	+5

Cumulative tournament scores, relative to par

Birdie	Bogey	Double bogey
