= Shaun Micheel =

American professional golfer (born 1969)

Personal information
- Full name: Shaun Carl Micheel
- Nationality: United States
- Born: January 5, 1969 (age 57) Orlando, Florida, U.S.
- Height: 6 ft 0 in (1.83 m)
- Weight: 180 lb (82 kg; 13 st)

Career
- Sport: Golf
- College: Indiana University
- Turned professional: 1992
- Current tours: PGA Tour Champions; European Senior Tour
- Former tours: PGA Tour; European Tour; Asian Tour
- Professional wins: 3
- Highest ranking: 34 (February 8, 2004)

Number of wins by tour
- PGA Tour: 1
- European Tour: 1
- Asian Tour: 1
- Korn Ferry Tour: 1

Best results in major championships (wins: 1)
- Masters Tournament: T22: 2004
- PGA Championship: Won: 2003
- U.S. Open: T22: 2010
- The Open Championship: T35: 2007

Shaun Carl Micheel (born January 5, 1969) is an American professional golfer who is best known for his surprise victory at the 2003 PGA Championship.

== Career ==
Micheel was born in Orlando, Florida. He attended Christian Brothers High School in Memphis, Tennessee and Indiana University.

In 1992, he turned professional. He taught himself how to play golf after his parents bought a home on a golf course in Memphis. He had a very patchy early career, during which he struggled to hold on to membership on the PGA Tour. His successes included a victory in the Singapore Open in 1998 and a win on the Nike Tour in 1999.

He went into the 2003 PGA Championship at Oak Hill Country Club ranked 169th in the Official World Golf Ranking and making his 164th PGA Tour start, becoming one of the biggest underdogs to win a major in recent times. In the first two rounds, he shot 69-68 (−3) to take a two-shot lead over Billy Andrade and Mike Weir. A third round 69 put him at −4, tied for the lead with Chad Campbell and three shots clear of Weir. He shot a par 70 in the final round to defeat Campbell by two strokes. That season, he finished 32nd on the money list. In 2004, he made the top 100 on the PGA Tour money list for the second time in his career, but he did not make the move up to being a regular high finisher. His career high world ranking is 34th, achieved in 2004.

In August 2006, Micheel returned to prominence when he finished runner-up to Tiger Woods at the PGA Championship at Medinah Country Club; he followed that with T7 two weeks later at the Deutsche Bank Championship. He was also runner-up at the 2006 HSBC World Match Play Championship, after defeating Woods in the first round. On the PGA Tour, he ended the year with nine consecutive cuts and placed in the top 50 on the money list.

Micheel is only the second golfer to make a double eagle (albatross) in U.S. Open history. It came on the 6th hole during the final round of the 2010 U.S. Open.

Micheel is one of the few golfers to have a major as his only PGA Tour win. Micheel has 405 starts through the end of the 2026 season, the most of any golfer whose only win was a major. He last played a full season in 2011, competing in the PGA Championship and other events through past champion status.

Micheel began playing the PGA Tour Champions in 2019.

=== Medical issues ===
In April 2005, after experiencing months of fatigue, mood changes, and poor play, Micheel began treatment for low testosterone ("Low T", or hypogonadism). He claimed that his testosterone levels had declined to those of "a man in his mid-70s." After beginning treatment, his testosterone levels returned to normal, and he reported that his drive and energy had also returned. His condition was widely publicized during the coverage of the 2006 PGA Championship. On April 18, 2014, after having coped with inability to exercise without being short of breath, Micheel underwent heart surgery and had four stents inserted.

== Professional wins (3) ==
=== PGA Tour wins (1) ===
Legend
Major championships (1)
Other PGA Tour (0)

No.	Date	Tournament	Winning score	Margin of victory	Runner-up
1	Aug 17, 2003	PGA Championship	−4 (69-68-69-70=276)	2 strokes	(United States) Chad Campbell

=== Asian PGA Tour wins (1) ===
No.	Date	Tournament	Winning score	Margin of victory	Runner-up
1	Aug 23, 1998	Ericsson Singapore Open	−16 (67-69-67-69=272)	2 strokes	(South Africa) Hendrik Buhrmann

=== Nike Tour wins (1) ===
No.	Date	Tournament	Winning score	Margin of victory	Runner-up
1	Jul 11, 1999	Nike Greensboro Open	−11 (67-66-67-69=269)	1 stroke	(United States) Garrett Willis

== Playoff record ==
Other playoff record (0–1)

No.	Year	Tournament	Opponents	Result
1	2003	Franklin Templeton Shootout (with (United States) Chad Campbell)	(United States) Brad Faxon and (United States) Scott McCarron, (United States) Hank Kuehne and (United States) Jeff Sluman	Kuehne/Sluman won with birdie on second extra hole

== Major championships ==
=== Wins (1) ===
Year	Championship	54 holes	Winning score	Margin	Runner-up
2003	PGA Championship	Tied for lead	−4 (69-68-69-70=276)	2 strokes	(United States) Chad Campbell

=== Results timeline ===
Results not in chronological order in 2020.

Tournament	1999	2000	2001	2002	2003	2004	2005	2006	2007	2008	2009
Masters Tournament						T22	CUT	CUT	CUT	CUT	
U.S. Open	CUT		T40			T28	CUT	CUT	CUT		
The Open Championship						T47	CUT	CUT	T35		
PGA Championship					1	T24	CUT	2	T32		CUT

Tournament	2010	2011	2012	2013	2014	2015	2016	2017	2018
Masters Tournament									
U.S. Open	T22								
The Open Championship									
PGA Championship	T48	T74	CUT	CUT	CUT	CUT	CUT	CUT	CUT

Tournament	2019	2020	2021	2022	2023	2024	2025	2026
Masters Tournament								
PGA Championship	CUT	CUT	CUT	CUT	CUT	CUT	CUT	CUT
U.S. Open								
The Open Championship		NT						

Win
Top 10
Did not play

CUT = missed the half-way cut
"T" indicates a tie for a place
NT = no tournament due to COVID-19 pandemic

=== Summary ===
Tournament	Wins	2nd	3rd	Top-5	Top-10	Top-25	Events	Cuts made
Masters Tournament	0	0	0	0	0	1	5	1
PGA Championship	1	1	0	2	2	3	23	6
U.S. Open	0	0	0	0	0	1	7	3
The Open Championship	0	0	0	0	0	0	4	2
Totals	1	1	0	2	2	5	39	12

- Most consecutive cuts made – 6 (2001 U.S. Open – 2004 PGA)
- Longest streak of top-10s – 1 (twice)

== Results in The Players Championship ==
Tournament	2001	2002	2003	2004	2005	2006	2007	2008	2009	2010	2011
The Players Championship	CUT		T54	9	T71	CUT	CUT	CUT			CUT

Top 10
Did not play

CUT = missed the halfway cut
"T" indicates a tie for a place

== Results in World Golf Championships ==
Tournament	2003	2004	2005	2006	2007
Match Play		R32			R16
Championship	T44				
Invitational	T23	T50			

Top 10
Did not play

QF, R16, R32, R64 = Round in which player lost in match play
"T" = tied

== Results in senior major championships ==
Tournament	2019	2020	2021	2022	2023	2024	2025	2026
Senior PGA Championship	T44	NT	T63	T43	T31	T63	CUT	CUT
The Tradition	T16	NT						
U.S. Senior Open	CUT	NT						CUT
Senior Players Championship	T46	T45			T61			
Senior British Open Championship	T60	NT	T53	CUT		T57	CUT	CUT

Did not play

CUT = missed the halfway cut
"T" indicates a tie for a place
NT = no tournament due to COVID-19 pandemic

== See also ==
- 1993 PGA Tour Qualifying School graduates
- 1996 PGA Tour Qualifying School graduates
- 1999 Nike Tour graduates
- 2001 PGA Tour Qualifying School graduates
- List of men's major championships winning golfers
