= List of Presidents Cup records =

The Presidents Cup is a biennial men's golf competition between a team representing the United States and an International Team representing the rest of the world without Europe. The first Presidents Cup took place in 1994.

For details of individual players' complete Presidents Cup records see: List of American Presidents Cup golfers and List of International Presidents Cup golfers.

== Summary ==
There have been a total of 482 individual matches played in the 15 Presidents Cups. Of these the United States has won 237, the International team has won 183 with 62 matches halved. Thus the United States have scored a total of 268 points to the International team's 214

Team	Overall	Singles	Foursomes	Fourballs
United States won	237	84	82	71
International won	183	69	48	66
Halved	62	27	21	14
United States points	268	97 1/2	92 1/2	78
International points	214	82 1/2	58 1/2	73
Total	482	180	151	151

== Holes-in-one ==
No golfer has achieved a hole-in-one during the Presidents Cup.

== Largest margins of victory in a match ==
All victories completed with 5 or more holes left to play are listed.

=== United States ===
Margin	Winner	Loser	Type	Year
7 & 5	Davis Love III & Jim Gallagher Jr.	Frank Nobilo & Robert Allenby	Foursomes	1994
7 & 5	David Toms	Robert Allenby	Singles	2011
6 & 5	Jay Haas & Scott Hoch	Fulton Allem & David Frost	Fourball	1994
6 & 5	Steve Stricker	Robert Allenby	Singles	1996
6 & 5	Tiger Woods & Notah Begay III	Vijay Singh & Ernie Els	Foursomes	2000
6 & 5	Hal Sutton & Jim Furyk	Michael Campbell & Greg Norman	Fourball	2000
6 & 5	Jim Furyk & Jay Haas	Stuart Appleby & Adam Scott	Fourball	2003
6 & 5	Phil Mickelson & Chris DiMarco	Peter Lonard & Nick O'Hern	Fourball	2005
6 & 5	Tiger Woods	Yang Yong-eun	Singles	2009
6 & 5	Hunter Mahan & David Toms	Kim Kyung-tae & Yang Yong-eun	Foursomes	2011
6 & 5	Kevin Chappell & Charley Hoffman	Anirban Lahiri & Charl Schwartzel	Fourball	2017
6 & 5	Patrick Cantlay & Xander Schauffele	Adam Scott & Hideki Matsuyama	Foursomes	2022

=== International ===
Margin	Winner	Loser	Type	Year
7 & 6	David Frost	Kenny Perry	Singles	1996
7 & 6	Adam Scott & K. J. Choi	Tiger Woods & Steve Stricker	Foursomes	2011
7 & 6	Hideki Matsuyama & Im Sung-jae	Patrick Cantlay & Xander Schauffele	Foursomes	2024
6 & 5	David Frost & Peter Senior	Hale Irwin & Jay Haas	Foursomes	1994
6 & 5	Nick Price & Greg Norman	Jim Furyk & David Duval	Fourball	2000
6 & 5	Carlos Franco	Hal Sutton	Singles	2000
6 & 5	Trevor Immelman & Mike Weir	Stewart Cink & David Toms	Foursomes	2005
6 & 5	Bae Sang-moon & Hideki Matsuyama	Jimmy Walker & Chris Kirk	Fourball	2015
6 & 5	Adam Scott	Rickie Fowler	Singles	2015
6 & 5	Corey Conners & Mackenzie Hughes	Wyndham Clark & Tony Finau	Foursomes	2024

== Pairings ==
=== Most frequent pairings ===
Pairings used 5 or more times are listed.

==== United States ====
Pairing	Number	Points	First year	Last year	Overall record W–L–H	Foursomes record W–L–H	Fourballs record W–L–H
Patrick Cantlay & Xander Schauffele	9	5	2019	2024	5–4–0	4–1–0	1–3–0
Fred Couples & Davis Love III	8	5.5	1994	2005	5–2–1	1–0–0	4–2–1
Tom Lehman & Phil Mickelson	5	4	1994	2000	4–1–0	2–1–0	2–0–0
Chris DiMarco & Phil Mickelson	5	3.5	2003	2005	3–1–1	2–1–0	1–0–1
Charles Howell III & Tiger Woods	5	3	2003	2007	3–2–0	3–0–0	0–2–0
Jim Furyk & Tiger Woods	5	3.5	2005	2007	3–1–1	1–0–1	2–1–0
Steve Stricker & Tiger Woods	5	4	2009	2011	4–1–0	2–1–0	2–0–0
Patrick Reed & Jordan Spieth	5	4.5	2015	2017	4–0–1	2–0–0	2–0–1
Rickie Fowler & Justin Thomas	5	4	2017	2019	3–0–2	1–0–2	2–0–0

==== International ====
Pairing	Number	Points	First year	Last year	Overall record W–L–H	Foursomes record W–L–H	Fourballs record W–L–H
Branden Grace & Louis Oosthuizen	7	5.5	2015	2017	5–1–1	3–0–1	2–1–0
Hideki Matsuyama & Adam Scott	7	2.5	2013	2022	2–4–1	2–3–0	0–1–1
Ernie Els & Vijay Singh	6	2	1998	2000	2–4–0	1–3–0	1–1–0
Ernie Els & Adam Scott	6	3	2003	2011	3–3–0	3–2–0	0–1–0
Retief Goosen & Adam Scott	6	4	2005	2009	3–1–2	1–0–1	2–1–1
Steve Elkington & Vijay Singh	5	3	1994	1996	3–2–0	3–1–0	0–1–0
Steve Elkington & Greg Norman	5	3.5	1998	2000	3–1–1	1–1–1	2–0–0
Stuart Appleby & Vijay Singh	5	3.5	1998	2007	3–1–1	0–0–1	3–1–0

== Age-related records ==
The ages given are on the first day of the Presidents Cup. Generally the leading 5 in each category are given.

=== Youngest players ===
==== United States ====
Age	Player	Year	Date of birth	Date of Cup
20 years, 68 days	Jordan Spieth	2013	27 July 1993	3 October 2013
21 years, 124 days	Jackson Koivun	2015	23 May 2005	24 September 2026
22 years, 73 days	Jordan Spieth	2015	27 July 1993	8 October 2015
22 years, 346 days	Tiger Woods	1998	30 December 1975	11 December 1998
24 years, 63 days	Jordan Spieth	2017	27 July 1993	28 September 2017
24 years, 90 days	Justin Leonard	1996	15 June 1972	13 September 1996

==== International ====
Age	Player	Year	Date of birth	Date of Cup
18 years, 21 days	Ryo Ishikawa	2009	17 September 1991	8 October 2009
20 years, 61 days	Ryo Ishikawa	2011	17 September 1991	17 November 2011
20 years, 93 days	Tom Kim	2022	21 June 2002	22 September 2022
21 years, 35 days	Joaquín Niemann	2019	7 November 1998	12 December 2019
21 years, 220 days	Hideki Matsuyama	2013	25 February 1992	3 October 2013

=== Oldest players ===
==== United States ====
Age	Player	Year	Date of birth	Date of Cup
49 years, 353 days	Jay Haas	2003	2 December 1953	20 November 2003
49 years, 105 days	Hale Irwin	1994	3 June 1945	16 September 1994
49 years, 100 days	Fred Funk	2005	14 June 1956	22 September 2005
49 years, 59 days	Kenny Perry	2009	10 August 1960	8 October 2009
47 years, 159 days	Fred Funk	2003	14 June 1956	20 November 2003

Hale Irwin in 1994 and Fred Funk in 2003 were rookies.

==== International ====
Age	Player	Year	Date of birth	Date of Cup
49 years, 233 days	Masashi "Jumbo" Ozaki	1996	24 January 1947	13 September 1996
46 years, 296 days	Nick Price	2003	28 January 1957	20 November 2003
46 years, 228 days	Vijay Singh	2009	22 February 1963	8 October 2009
45 years, 334 days	Thongchai Jaidee	2015	8 November 1969	8 October 2015
45 years, 252 days	Greg Norman	2000	10 February 1955	19 October 2000

Masashi Ozaki in 1996 and Thongchai Jaidee in 2015 were rookies.

=== Captains ===
- Youngest Presidents Cup captain: Tiger Woods – 43 years, 347 days in 2019
- Youngest International team captain: Trevor Immelman – 42 years, 280 days in 2022
- Youngest non-playing United States captain: Fred Couples – 50 years, 5 days in 2009
- Oldest Presidents Cup captain: Gary Player – 71 years, 330 days in 2007
- Oldest United States captain: Ken Venturi – 69 years, 157 days in 2000
