= List of American Presidents Cup golfers =

This is a list of all the American golfers who have played in the Presidents Cup through 2026. Phil Mickelson holds the record number of appearances with 12.

== Players ==
Player	Editions
Woody Austin	2007
Paul Azinger	2000
Notah Begay III	2000
Daniel Berger	2017
Keegan Bradley	2013, 2024
Jacob Bridgeman	2026
Mark Brooks	1996
Sam Burns	2022, 2024, 2026
Mark Calcavecchia	1998
Patrick Cantlay	2019, 2022, 2024, 2026
Kevin Chappell	2017
Stewart Cink	2000, 2005, 2007, 2009
Wyndham Clark	2024,2026
Fred Couples	1994, 1996, 1998, 2005
Bryson DeChambeau	2019
Chris DiMarco	2003, 2005
Jason Dufner	2013
David Duval	1996, 1998, 2000
Tony Finau	2019, 2022, 2024
Rickie Fowler	2015, 2017, 2019
Fred Funk	2003, 2005
Jim Furyk	1998, 2000, 2003, 2005, 2007, 2009, 2011, 2015+
Jim Gallagher Jr.	1994
Lucas Glover	2007, 2009
Chris Gotterup	2026
Bill Haas	2011, 2013, 2015
Jay Haas	1994, 2003
Brian Harman	2024
Russell Henley	2024, 2026
Scott Hoch	1994, 1996, 1998
Charley Hoffman	2017
J. B. Holmes	2015
Max Homa	2022, 2024
Billy Horschel	2022
Charles Howell III	2003, 2007
John Huston	1994, 1998
Hale Irwin	1994*
Lee Janzen	1998
Dustin Johnson	2011, 2015, 2017, 2019
Zach Johnson	2007, 2009, 2013, 2015
Jerry Kelly	2003
Anthony Kim	2009
Chris Kirk	2015
Kevin Kisner	2017, 2022
Brooks Koepka	2017, 2019+
Jackson Koivun	2026
Matt Kuchar	2011, 2013, 2015, 2017, 2019
Tom Lehman	1994, 1996, 2000
Justin Leonard	1996, 1998, 2003, 2005, 2009
Davis Love III	1994, 1996, 1998, 2000, 2003, 2005
Jeff Maggert	1994
Hunter Mahan	2007, 2009, 2011, 2013
Phil Mickelson	1994, 1996, 1998, 2000, 2003, 2005, 2007, 2009, 2011, 2013, 2015, 2017
Collin Morikawa	2022, 2024, 2026
Sean O'Hair	2009
Mark O'Meara	1996, 1998
Corey Pavin	1994, 1996
Kenny Perry	1996, 2003, 2005, 2009
Patrick Reed	2015, 2017, 2019
Loren Roberts	1994, 2000
Xander Schauffele	2019, 2022, 2024, 2026
Scottie Scheffler	2022, 2024, 2026
Webb Simpson	2011, 2013, 2019
Brandt Snedeker	2013
Jordan Spieth	2013, 2015, 2017, 2022
Steve Stricker	1996, 2007, 2009, 2011, 2013
Hal Sutton	1998+, 2000
Sahith Theegala	2024
Justin Thomas	2017, 2019, 2022, 2026
David Toms	2003, 2005, 2007, 2011
Kirk Triplett	2000
Scott Verplank	2005, 2007
Jimmy Walker	2015
Nick Watney	2011
Bubba Watson	2011, 2015
Gary Woodland	2019
Tiger Woods	1998, 2000, 2003, 2005, 2007, 2009, 2011, 2013, 2019*
Cameron Young	2022, 2026

- + Selected or qualified for the team but withdrew and was replaced.
- * Playing captain

== Playing record ==
O = Overall, S = Singles matches, Fs = Foursome matches, Fb = Fourball matches
W = Matches won, L = Matches lost, H = Matches halved

Player	First year	Last year	Presidents Cups	Matches	Points	Winning percentage	O W	O L	O H	S W	S L	S H	Fs W	Fs L	Fs H	Fb W	Fb L	Fb H
Woody Austin	2007	2007	1	5	2.5	50.00%	1	1	3	0	1	0	1	0	1	0	0	2
Paul Azinger	2000	2000	1	3	1	33.33%	1	2	0	0	1	0	1	0	0	0	1	0
Notah Begay III	2000	2000	1	5	3	60.00%	3	2	0	1	0	0	2	0	0	0	2	0
Daniel Berger	2017	2017	1	3	2	66.67%	2	1	0	1	0	0	0	1	0	1	0	0
Keegan Bradley	2013	2024	2	8	4.5	56.25%	4	3	1	1	1	0	1	0	1	2	2	0
Jacob Bridgeman	2026	2026	1	0	0	00.00%	0	0	0	0	0	0	0	0	0	0	0	0
Mark Brooks	1996	1996	1	3	0	0.00%	0	3	0	0	1	0	0	1	0	0	1	0
Sam Burns	2022	2026	2	9	4.5	50.00%	3	3	3	0	0	2	1	2	0	2	1	1
Mark Calcavecchia	1998	1998	1	4	2	50.00%	1	1	2	0	0	1	0	0	1	1	1	0
Patrick Cantlay	2019	2026	4	14	10	71.43%	10	4	0	3	0	0	4	1	0	3	3	0
Kevin Chappell	2017	2017	1	3	1.5	50.00%	1	1	1	0	0	1	0	0	0	1	1	0
Stewart Cink	2000	2009	4	18	10	55.56%	9	7	2	3	1	0	4	2	1	2	4	1
Wyndham Clark	2024	2026	2	4	1.5	37.50%	1	2	1	0	0	1	0	1	0	1	1	0
Fred Couples	1994	2005	4	16	10	62.50%	9	5	2	3	0	1	2	2	0	4	3	1
Bryson DeChambeau	2019	2019	1	2	0.5	25.00%	0	1	1	0	0	1	0	0	0	0	1	0
Chris DiMarco	2003	2005	2	10	6.5	65.00%	6	3	1	2	0	0	2	2	0	2	1	1
Jason Dufner	2013	2013	1	4	3	75.00%	3	1	0	1	0	0	1	1	0	1	0	0
David Duval	1996	2000	3	14	7.5	53.57%	7	6	1	2	1	0	2	3	0	3	2	1
Tony Finau	2019	2024	3	12	6.5	54.17%	5	4	3	1	1	1	2	1	1	2	2	1
Rickie Fowler	2015	2019	3	12	7	58.33%	5	3	4	1	1	1	2	1	3	2	1	0
Fred Funk	2003	2005	2	8	2.5	31.25%	1	4	3	0	2	0	1	1	2	0	1	1
Jim Furyk	1998	2011	7	33	21.5	65.15%	20	10	3	5	2	0	7	3	3	8	5	0
Jim Gallagher Jr.	1994	1994	1	5	3.5	70.00%	3	1	1	1	0	0	1	0	1	1	1	0
Chris Gotterup	2026	2026	1	0	0	00.00%	0	0	0	0	0	0	0	0	0	0	0	0
Lucas Glover	2007	2009	2	9	2.5	27.78%	2	6	1	0	1	1	2	1	0	0	4	0
Bill Haas	2011	2015	3	13	5.5	42.31%	4	6	3	1	2	0	1	2	2	2	2	1
Jay Haas	1994	2003	2	9	5.5	61.11%	5	3	1	2	0	0	1	1	1	2	2	0
Brian Harman	2024	2024	1	3	0	0.00%	0	3	0	0	1	0	0	2	0	0	0	0
Russell Henley	2024	2026	2	4	3	75.00%	3	1	0	1	0	0	1	1	0	1	0	0
Scott Hoch	1994	1998	3	12	7.5	62.50%	7	4	1	2	0	1	2	2	0	3	2	0
Charley Hoffman	2017	2017	1	3	1	33.33%	1	2	0	0	1	0	0	0	0	1	1	0
J. B. Holmes	2015	2015	1	5	2.5	50.00%	2	2	1	0	1	0	1	0	1	1	1	0
Max Homa	2022	2024	2	7	5	71.43%	5	2	0	2	0	0	2	2	0	1	0	0
Billy Horschel	2022	2022	1	3	1	33.33%	1	2	0	0	1	0	0	0	0	1	1	0
Charles Howell III	2003	2007	2	9	5	55.56%	5	4	0	2	0	0	3	0	0	0	4	0
John Huston	1994	1998	2	8	1	12.50%	1	7	0	0	2	0	0	2	0	1	3	0
Hale Irwin	1994	1994	1	3	2	66.67%	2	1	0	1	0	0	1	1	0	0	0	0
Lee Janzen	1998	1998	1	4	2	50.00%	1	1	2	0	0	1	0	1	1	1	0	0
Dustin Johnson	2011	2019	4	18	11	61.11%	10	6	2	2	1	1	6	1	1	2	4	0
Zach Johnson	2007	2015	4	17	10.5	61.76%	10	6	1	2	2	0	5	2	0	3	2	1
Jerry Kelly	2003	2003	1	4	2	50.00%	2	2	0	1	0	0	1	1	0	0	1	0
Anthony Kim	2009	2009	1	4	3	75.00%	3	1	0	1	0	0	1	0	0	1	1	0
Chris Kirk	2015	2015	1	3	1	33.33%	1	2	0	1	0	0	0	0	0	0	2	0
Kevin Kisner	2017	2022	2	7	3.5	50.00%	2	2	3	0	1	1	1	0	1	1	1	1
Brooks Koepka	2017	2017	1	4	2	50.00%	2	2	0	0	1	0	0	1	0	2	0	0
Jackson Koivun	2026	2026	1	0	0	00.00%	0	0	0	0	0	0	0	0	0	0	0	0
Matt Kuchar	2011	2019	5	20	8.5	42.50%	6	9	5	0	4	1	3	4	3	3	1	1
Tom Lehman	1994	2000	3	15	6.5	43.33%	6	8	1	0	2	1	3	3	0	3	3	0
Justin Leonard	1996	2009	5	23	10	43.48%	8	11	4	1	3	1	4	3	3	3	5	0
Davis Love III	1994	2005	6	28	18	64.29%	16	8	4	4	1	1	5	3	2	7	4	1
Jeff Maggert	1994	1994	1	4	2	50.00%	2	2	0	1	0	0	0	2	0	1	0	0
Hunter Mahan	2007	2013	4	18	10.5	58.33%	10	7	1	3	1	0	4	2	1	3	4	0
Phil Mickelson	1994	2017	12	55	32.5	59.09%	26	16	13	4	5	3	12	6	4	10	5	6
Collin Morikawa	2022	2026	3	8	6	75.00%	6	2	0	2	0	0	2	2	0	2	0	0
Sean O'Hair	2009	2009	1	5	2.5	50.00%	2	2	1	1	0	0	1	1	0	0	1	1
Mark O'Meara	1996	1998	2	9	7	77.78%	7	2	0	2	0	0	2	1	0	3	1	0
Corey Pavin	1994	1996	2	10	4	40.00%	3	5	2	0	2	0	1	2	1	2	1	1
Kenny Perry	1996	2009	4	17	8	47.06%	8	9	0	2	2	0	4	3	0	2	4	0
Patrick Reed	2015	2019	3	13	6	46.15%	5	6	2	1	1	1	2	3	0	2	2	1
Loren Roberts	1994	2000	2	7	4.5	64.29%	4	2	1	1	0	1	3	0	0	0	2	0
Xander Schauffele	2019	2026	4	14	10	71.43%	10	4	0	3	0	0	4	1	0	3	3	0
Scottie Scheffler	2022	2026	3	9	3.5	38.89%	3	5	1	0	2	0	1	3	0	2	0	1
Webb Simpson	2011	2019	3	14	7	50.00%	6	6	2	1	1	1	3	2	0	2	3	1
Brandt Snedeker	2013	2013	1	5	2	40.00%	2	3	0	0	1	0	1	1	0	1	1	0
Jordan Spieth	2013	2022	4	19	13.5	71.05%	13	5	1	1	3	0	7	0	0	5	2	1
Steve Stricker	1996	2013	5	24	14	58.33%	14	10	0	2	3	0	6	3	0	6	4	0
Hal Sutton	2000	2000	1	5	3	60.00%	3	2	0	0	1	0	2	0	0	1	1	0
Sahith Theegala	2024	2024	1	3	1.5	50.00%	1	1	1	0	0	1	0	1	0	1	0	0
Justin Thomas	2017	2026	4	15	11	73.33%	10	3	2	0	3	0	4	0	2	6	0	0
David Toms	2003	2011	4	18	9.5	52.78%	9	8	1	3	1	0	5	3	0	1	4	1
Kirk Triplett	2000	2000	1	4	3.5	87.50%	3	0	1	0	0	1	2	0	0	1	0	0
Scott Verplank	2005	2007	2	9	6.5	72.22%	6	2	1	1	1	0	3	0	1	2	1	0
Jimmy Walker	2015	2015	1	4	1	25.00%	1	3	0	0	1	0	1	0	0	0	2	0
Nick Watney	2011	2011	1	4	2.5	62.50%	2	1	1	1	0	0	0	0	1	1	1	0
Bubba Watson	2011	2015	2	10	6	60.00%	5	3	2	0	1	1	3	0	1	2	2	0
Gary Woodland	2019	2019	1	4	1.5	37.50%	1	2	1	0	1	0	1	0	1	0	1	0
Tiger Woods	1998	2019	9	43	27.5	63.95%	27	15	1	7	2	0	12	4	1	8	9	0
Cameron Young	2022	2026	2	4	1.5	37.50%	1	2	1	0	1	0	1	1	0	0	0	1

== Record American point winners ==
Rank	Name	Record (W–L–H)	Points	Winning percentage
1	Phil Mickelson	26–16–13	32.5	59.09%
2	Tiger Woods	27–15–1	27.5	63.95%
3	Jim Furyk	20–10–3	21.5	65.15%
4	Davis Love III	16–8–4	18	64.29%
5	Steve Stricker	14–10–0	14	58.33%

== See also ==
- Golf in the United States
- List of International Presidents Cup golfers
- List of American Ryder Cup golfers
- Lists of golfers
