= List of International Presidents Cup golfers =

This is a list of all the International team golfers who have played in the Presidents Cup through 2024. The International Team represents the rest of the world excluding the United States (the opponents) and Europe (which plays the United States in the Ryder Cup). Adam Scott holds the record number of appearances with 12. Scott also holds the record for most points with 23.

== Players ==
Player	Country	Editions
Fulton Allem	South Africa	1994
Robert Allenby	Australia	1994, 1996, 2000, 2003, 2009, 2011
An Byeong-hun	South Korea	2019, 2024
Abraham Ancer	Mexico	2019
Stuart Appleby	Australia	1998, 2000, 2003, 2005, 2007
Aaron Baddeley	Australia	2011
Bae Sang-moon	South Korea	2015
Christiaan Bezuidenhout	South Africa	2022, 2024, 2026
Steven Bowditch	Australia	2015
Ángel Cabrera	Argentina	2005, 2007, 2009, 2013
Michael Campbell	New Zealand	2000, 2005
K. J. Choi	South Korea	2003, 2007, 2011
Tim Clark	South Africa	2003, 2005, 2009
Corey Conners	Canada	2022, 2024, 2026
Cameron Davis	Australia	2022
Jason Day	Australia	2011, 2013, 2015, 2017, 2019+, 2024
Brendon de Jonge	Zimbabwe	2013
Graham DeLaet	Canada	2013
Nico Echavarría	Colombia	2026
Steve Elkington	Australia	1994, 1996, 1998, 2000
Ernie Els	South Africa	1996, 1998, 2000, 2003, 2007, 2009, 2011, 2013
Ryan Fox	New Zealand	2026
Carlos Franco	Paraguay	1998, 2000
David Frost	South Africa	1994, 1996
Retief Goosen	South Africa	2000, 2003, 2005, 2007, 2009, 2011
Branden Grace	South Africa	2013, 2015, 2017
Emiliano Grillo	Argentina	2017
Adam Hadwin	Canada	2017, 2019
Mark Hensby	Australia	2005
Bradley Hughes	Australia	1994
Mackenzie Hughes	Canada	2024
Im Sung-jae	South Korea	2019, 2022, 2024, 2026
Trevor Immelman	South Africa	2005, 2007
Ryo Ishikawa	Japan	2009, 2011
Thongchai Jaidee	Thailand	2015
Kim Kyung-tae	South Korea	2011
Kim Si-woo	South Korea	2017, 2022, 2024, 2026
Tom Kim	South Korea	2022, 2024, 2026
Anirban Lahiri	India	2015, 2017
Stephen Leaney	Australia	2003
Danny Lee	New Zealand	2015
Lee Kyoung-hoon	South Korea	2022
Min Woo Lee	Australia	2024, 2026
Marc Leishman	Australia	2013, 2015, 2017, 2019
Li Haotong	China	2019
Peter Lonard	Australia	2003, 2005
Shigeki Maruyama	Japan	1998, 2000
Hideki Matsuyama	Japan	2013, 2015, 2017, 2019, 2022, 2024, 2026
Mark McNulty	Zimbabwe	1994, 1996
Sebastián Muñoz	Colombia	2022
Joaquín Niemann	Chile	2019
Frank Nobilo	New Zealand	1994, 1996, 1998
Greg Norman	Australia	1994+, 1996, 1998, 2000
Geoff Ogilvy	Australia	2007, 2009, 2011
Nick O'Hern	Australia	2005, 2007
Louis Oosthuizen	South Africa	2013, 2015, 2017, 2019
Masashi "Jumbo" Ozaki	Japan	1996
Naomichi "Joe" Ozaki	Japan	1998
Pan Cheng-tsung	Chinese Taipei	2019
Craig Parry	Australia	1994, 1996, 1998
Taylor Pendrith	Canada	2022, 2024
Mito Pereira	Chile	2022
Nick Price	Zimbabwe	1994, 1996, 1998, 2000, 2003
Rory Sabbatini	South Africa	2007
Charl Schwartzel	South Africa	2011, 2013, 2015, 2017
Adam Scott	Australia	2003, 2005, 2007, 2009, 2011, 2013, 2015, 2017, 2019, 2022, 2024, 2026
Peter Senior	Australia	1994, 1996
Vijay Singh	Fiji	1994, 1996, 1998, 2000, 2003, 2005, 2007, 2009
Cameron Smith	Australia	2019
Richard Sterne	South Africa	2013
Nick Taylor	Canada	2026
Greg Turner	New Zealand	1998
Jhonattan Vegas	Venezuela	2017
Camilo Villegas	Colombia	2009
Tsukasa Watanabe	Japan	1994
Mike Weir	Canada	2000, 2003, 2005, 2007, 2009
Yang Yong-eun	South Korea	2009, 2011

- + Selected or qualified for the team but withdrew and was replaced.

== Playing record ==
O = Overall, S = Singles matches, Fs = Foursome matches, Fb = Fourball matches
W = Matches won, L = Matches lost, H = Matches halved

Cty	Player	First year	Last year	Presidents Cups	Matches	Points	Winning percentage	O W	O L	O H	S W	S L	S H	Fs W	Fs L	Fs H	Fb W	Fb L	Fb H
(South Africa)	Fulton Allem	1994	1994	1	5	1.5	30.00%	1	3	1	0	0	1	0	2	0	1	1	0
(Australia)	Robert Allenby	1994	2011	6	28	9.5	33.93%	8	17	3	1	4	1	3	7	2	4	6	0
(South Korea)	An Byeong-hun	2019	2024	2	8	3.5	43.75%	2	3	3	0	1	1	1	1	1	1	1	1
(Mexico)	Abraham Ancer	2019	2019	1	5	3.5	70.00%	3	1	1	0	1	0	1	0	1	2	0	0
(Australia)	Stuart Appleby	1998	2007	5	21	6	28.57%	5	14	2	0	5	0	1	6	2	4	3	0
(Australia)	Aaron Baddeley	2011	2011	1	5	1.5	30.00%	1	3	1	0	1	0	0	1	1	1	1	0
(South Korea)	Bae Sang-moon	2015	2015	1	4	2.5	62.50%	2	1	1	0	1	0	0	0	1	2	0	0
(South Africa)	Christiaan Bezuidenhout	2022	2026	3	5	3.5	70.00%	3	1	1	2	0	0	1	0	0	0	1	1
(Australia)	Steven Bowditch	2015	2015	1	3	1	33.33%	1	2	0	1	0	0	0	1	0	0	1	0
(Argentina)	Ángel Cabrera	2005	2013	4	17	7.5	44.12%	6	8	3	3	0	1	2	3	0	1	5	2
(New Zealand)	Michael Campbell	2000	2005	2	9	4.5	50.00%	3	3	3	1	0	1	1	2	0	1	1	2
(South Korea)	K. J. Choi	2003	2011	3	14	6	42.86%	6	8	0	2	1	0	1	4	0	3	3	0
(South Africa)	Tim Clark	2003	2009	3	15	7	46.67%	6	7	2	1	2	0	1	5	0	4	0	2
(Canada)	Corey Conners	2022	2026	3	9	2	22.22%	2	7	0	1	1	0	1	3	0	0	3	0
(Australia)	Cameron Davis	2022	2022	1	5	2	40.00%	2	3	0	0	1	0	1	1	0	1	1	0
(Australia)	Jason Day	2011	2024	5	23	8	34.78%	6	13	4	2	3	0	1	5	3	3	5	1
(Zimbabwe)	Brendon de Jonge	2013	2013	1	5	2	40.00%	2	3	0	0	1	0	2	0	0	0	2	0
(Canada)	Graham DeLaet	2013	2013	1	5	3.5	70.00%	3	1	1	1	0	0	0	1	1	2	0	0
(Colombia)	Nico Echavarría	2026	2026	1	0	0	00.00%	0	0	0	0	0	0	0	0	0	0	0	0
(Australia)	Steve Elkington	1994	2000	4	19	11.5	60.53%	10	6	3	2	1	1	4	2	1	4	3	1
(South Africa)	Ernie Els	1996	2013	8	40	21	52.50%	20	18	2	4	4	0	8	7	1	8	7	1
(New Zealand)	Ryan Fox	2026	2026	1	0	0	00.00%	0	0	0	0	0	0	0	0	0	0	0	0
(Paraguay)	Carlos Franco	1998	2000	2	8	2.5	31.25%	2	5	1	1	0	1	0	2	0	1	3	0
(South Africa)	David Frost	1994	1996	2	7	3.5	50.00%	3	3	1	1	0	1	2	2	0	0	1	0
(South Africa)	Retief Goosen	2000	2011	6	29	15.5	53.45%	14	12	3	4	2	0	2	8	2	8	2	1
(South Africa)	Branden Grace	2013	2017	3	14	7	50.00%	6	6	2	1	1	1	3	1	1	2	4	0
(Argentina)	Emiliano Grillo	2017	2017	1	3	0	0.00%	0	3	0	0	1	0	0	2	0	0	0	0
(Canada)	Adam Hadwin	2017	2019	2	6	2	33.33%	1	3	2	0	1	1	0	2	0	1	0	1
(Australia)	Mark Hensby	2005	2005	1	4	1.5	37.50%	1	2	1	0	1	0	0	0	1	1	1	0
(Japan)	Ryo Hisatsune	2026	2026	1	0	0	00.00%	0	0	0	0	0	0	0	0	0	0	0	0
(Australia)	Bradley Hughes	1994	1994	1	4	1	25.00%	1	3	0	0	1	0	0	1	0	1	1	0
(Canada)	Mackenzie Hughes	2024	2024	1	4	1	25.00%	1	3	0	0	1	0	1	1	0	0	1	0
(South Korea)	Im Sung-jae	2019	2026	4	15	7	46.67%	6	7	2	2	1	0	1	4	1	3	2	1
(South Africa)	Trevor Immelman	2005	2007	2	8	1.5	18.75%	1	6	1	0	2	0	1	3	0	0	1	1
(Japan)	Ryo Ishikawa	2009	2011	2	9	5	55.56%	5	4	0	2	0	0	2	2	0	1	2	0
(Thailand)	Thongchai Jaidee	2015	2015	1	3	1.5	50.00%	1	1	1	0	0	1	0	1	0	1	0	0
(South Korea)	Kim Kyung-tae	2011	2011	1	4	2	50.00%	2	2	0	1	0	0	0	1	0	1	1	0
(South Korea)	Kim Si-woo	2017	2026	4	11	6	54.55%	6	5	0	1	2	0	2	3	0	3	0	0
(South Korea)	Tom Kim	2022	2026	3	9	3.5	38.89%	3	5	1	0	1	1	1	2	0	2	2	0
(India)	Anirban Lahiri	2015	2017	2	6	1.5	25.00%	1	4	1	0	1	1	0	1	0	1	2	0
(Australia)	Stephen Leaney	2003	2003	1	4	1.5	37.50%	1	2	1	0	1	0	0	1	1	1	0	0
(New Zealand)	Danny Lee	2015	2015	1	3	1	33.33%	1	2	0	0	1	0	0	1	0	1	0	0
(South Korea)	Lee Kyoung-hoon	2022	2022	1	3	2	66.67%	2	1	0	1	0	0	1	1	0	0	0	0
(Australia)	Min Woo Lee	2024	2026	2	2	0.5	25.00%	0	1	1	0	0	1	0	0	0	0	1	0
(Australia)	Marc Leishman	2013	2019	4	18	6.5	36.11%	4	9	5	2	0	2	2	3	3	0	6	0
(China)	Li Haotong	2019	2019	1	2	0	0.00%	0	2	0	0	1	0	0	0	0	0	1	0
(Australia)	Peter Lonard	2003	2005	2	8	4	50.00%	4	4	0	2	0	0	0	3	0	2	1	0
(Japan)	Shigeki Maruyama	1998	2000	2	8	6	75.00%	6	2	0	1	1	0	2	1	0	3	0	0
(Japan)	Hideki Matsuyama	2013	2026	7	27	11.5	42.59%	9	13	5	3	1	2	3	6	1	3	6	2
(Zimbabwe)	Mark McNulty	1994	1996	2	9	4	44.44%	3	4	2	0	2	0	1	1	2	2	1	0
(Colombia)	Sebastián Muñoz	2022	2022	1	3	2.5	83.33%	2	0	1	1	0	0	0	0	0	1	0	1
(Chile)	Joaquín Niemann	2019	2019	1	4	0.5	12.50%	0	3	1	0	1	0	0	1	1	0	1	0
(New Zealand)	Frank Nobilo	1994	1998	3	14	5.5	39.29%	5	8	1	1	1	1	4	2	0	0	5	0
(Australia)	Greg Norman	1996	2000	3	14	7.5	53.57%	7	6	1	1	2	0	2	2	1	4	2	0
(Australia)	Geoff Ogilvy	2007	2011	3	14	7.5	53.57%	7	6	1	3	0	0	0	4	1	4	2	0
(Australia)	Nick O'Hern	2005	2007	2	10	3	30.00%	3	7	0	0	2	0	1	3	0	2	2	0
(South Africa)	Louis Oosthuizen	2013	2019	4	19	11	57.89%	9	6	4	1	0	3	4	3	1	4	3	0
(Japan)	Masashi "Jumbo" Ozaki	1996	1996	1	3	1	33.33%	1	2	0	0	1	0	0	0	0	1	1	0
(Japan)	Naomichi "Joe" Ozaki	1998	1998	1	3	2	66.67%	2	1	0	0	1	0	0	0	0	2	0	0
(Chinese Taipei)	Pan Cheng-tsung	2019	2019	1	3	2	66.67%	2	1	0	0	1	0	0	0	0	2	0	0
(Australia)	Craig Parry	1994	1998	3	12	6	50.00%	6	6	0	3	0	0	2	3	0	1	3	0
(Canada)	Taylor Pendrith	2022	2024	2	9	2	22.22%	2	7	0	0	2	0	2	1	0	0	4	0
(Chile)	Mito Pereira	2022	2022	1	3	0.5	16.67%	0	2	1	0	1	0	0	1	0	0	0	1
(Zimbabwe)	Nick Price	1994	2003	5	23	10	43.48%	8	11	4	1	4	0	4	2	2	3	5	2
(South Africa)	Rory Sabbatini	2007	2007	1	4	0.5	12.50%	0	3	1	0	1	0	0	2	0	0	0	1
(South Africa)	Charl Schwartzel	2011	2017	4	17	7.5	44.12%	7	9	1	3	1	0	0	5	1	4	3	0
(Australia)	Adam Scott	2003	2026	12	54	23	42.59%	20	28	6	5	6	0	10	10	2	5	12	4
(Australia)	Peter Senior	1994	1996	2	6	3	50.00%	3	3	0	1	1	0	2	0	0	0	2	0
(Fiji)	Vijay Singh	1994	2009	8	40	20.5	51.25%	16	15	9	1	4	3	6	6	4	9	5	2
(Australia)	Cameron Smith	2019	2019	1	3	1.5	50.00%	1	1	1	1	0	0	0	1	1	0	0	0
(South Africa)	Richard Sterne	2013	2013	1	4	0	0.00%	0	4	0	0	1	0	0	2	0	0	1	0
(Canada)	Nick Taylor	2026	2026	1	0	0	00.00%	0	0	0	0	0	0	0	0	0	0	0	0
(New Zealand)	Greg Turner	1998	1998	1	4	2.5	62.50%	2	1	1	0	0	1	2	0	0	0	1	0
(Venezuela)	Jhonattan Vegas	2017	2017	1	5	1	20.00%	1	4	0	1	0	0	0	2	0	0	2	0
(Colombia)	Camilo Villegas	2009	2009	1	4	0	0.00%	0	4	0	0	1	0	0	2	0	0	1	0
(Japan)	Tsukasa Watanabe	1994	1994	1	3	1	33.33%	1	2	0	0	1	0	0	1	0	1	0	0
(Canada)	Mike Weir	2000	2009	5	24	14	58.33%	13	9	2	3	1	1	3	6	1	7	2	0
(South Korea)	Yang Yong-eun	2009	2011	2	9	3.5	38.89%	3	5	1	0	2	0	1	1	1	2	2	0

== Record International point winners ==
Rank	Name	Record (W–L–H)	Points	Winning percentage
1	(Australia) Adam Scott	20–28–6	23	42.59%
2	(South Africa) Ernie Els	20–18–2	21	52.50%
3	(Fiji) Vijay Singh	16–15–9	20.5	51.25%
4	(South Africa) Retief Goosen	14–12–3	15.5	53.45%
5	(Canada) Mike Weir	13–9–2	14	58.33%

== International appearances by country ==
Country	Appearances	Events	Players	Most capped player (#)
Australia	60	16	20	Adam Scott (12)
South Africa	38	16	12	Ernie Els (8)
South Korea	21	10	9	Im Sung-jae (4); Kim Si-woo (4)
Japan	15	13	7	Hideki Matsuyama (7)
Canada	15	11	7	Mike Weir (5)
Fiji	8	8	1	Vijay Singh (8)
Zimbabwe	8	6	3	Nick Price (5)
New Zealand	8	7	5	Frank Nobilo (3)
Argentina	5	5	2	Ángel Cabrera (4)
Colombia	3	3	3	Nico Echavarría (1); Sebastián Muñoz (1); Camilo Villegas (1)
Chile	2	2	2	Joaquín Niemann (1); Mito Pereira (1)
India	2	2	1	Anirban Lahiri (2)
Paraguay	2	2	1	Carlos Franco (2)
China	1	1	1	Li Haotong (1)
Chinese Taipei	1	1	1	Pan Cheng-tsung (1)
Mexico	1	1	1	Abraham Ancer (1)
Thailand	1	1	1	Thongchai Jaidee (1)
Venezuela	1	1	1	Jhonattan Vegas (1)

== See also ==
- List of American Presidents Cup golfers
- Lists of golfers
