= Golfer (disambiguation) =

Golfer may refer to:

- A person who plays golf
  - Professional golfer

== See also ==
- Lists of golfers
