= Royal Melbourne Golf Club =

36-hole golf club in Australia

The Royal Melbourne Golf Club
- Location in Australia Location in Victoria Location in greater Melbourne
- 37.97°S 145.03°E

Club information
- Location: Black Rock, Victoria, Australia
- Established: 1891 (club), 135 years ago 1926 (West); 1931 (East)
- Type: Private
- Total holes: 36
- Tournaments: Australian Open; The Presidents Cup; Women's Australian Open
- Website: royalmelbourne.com.au

West Course
- Designed by: Dr. Alister MacKenzie & Alex Russell Tom Doak (2015-2016 renovation)
- Par: 72
- Length: 6,077 m (6,646 yd)

East Course
- Designed by: Alex Russell
- Par: 71
- Length: 6,007 m (6,569 yd)

The Royal Melbourne Golf Club is a 36-hole golf club in Australia, located in Black Rock, Victoria, a suburb in southeastern Melbourne. Its West and East courses are respectively ranked number 1 and 6 in Australia. The West course is ranked in the top-five courses in the world. Founded 135 years ago in 1891, it is Australia's oldest extant and continually existing golf club.

Royal Melbourne has hosted numerous national and international events. As of 2025, its 17 Australian Opens are surpassed by only the 22 hosted by The Australian Golf Club. It hosted the 1959 Canada Cup, and the 1972 World Cup. Royal Melbourne also hosted the Bicentennial Classic, a tournament to celebrate the Australian Bicentenary in 1988. It was selected by the PGA Tour to hold the Presidents Cup, for the first time outside the United States, in 1998. The match was convincingly won by the International team, captained by Peter Thomson, an honorary member of Royal Melbourne. The course hosted the Presidents Cup again in 2011 and 2019. It was the site of the Women's Australian Open for the first time in 2012, which was an LPGA Tour event, and it returned three years later in 2015. In 2025, Royal Melbourne hosted the Australian Open for the first time since 1991.

== History ==
Founded in 1891 as the Melbourne Golf Club ("Royal" prefix given in 1895), the founding president was politician Sir James MacBain, and the founding captain was businessman John Munro Bruce (father of Australian prime minister Stanley Bruce). The principal founding members included P.K. (Patrick Kinney) McCaughan, a New Zealand pastoralist, parliamentarian, businessman and developer and proprietor of the Old Rialto Hotel building in Collins Street.

The club had to give up its original site at Caulfield, much nearer the city centre, because of increasing urbanization. A new links, the "West course", was started at Sandringham in 1898. It planned a move to its present location in the mid-1920s. Royal Melbourne's two current courses are known as the "West" and "East" courses. The West course was designed under the strict standards of famous course architect Alister MacKenzie. He visited the eventual site, located on the renowned Melbourne Sandbelt, south of the city, in 1926. The actual building of the West course was overseen by the famed Australian golfer Alex Russell, as well as the head greenkeeper Mick Morcom; it was completed for play in 1931. The East course was designed by Russell, and was completed in 1932.

== Features ==
A combination comprising 18 holes from both the East and West courses that are limited to the main property ("paddock") is known as the "Composite" course. There have been 21 holes used in the history of the "Composite" course, from 1959 to 2011, depending on the event being held.

The East course is less known compared to its world-renowned sister course, but it has still been held in very high regard since its completion. The West course has several holes that are celebrated internationally, but they are not long compared to the current standards for championship par 4s and 5s. The course is strictly landlocked by existing boundaries, which is why these holes have not been greatly extended in recent decades. Significant restoration of the West course (and East course Composite holes), as well as minor lengthening, took place leading up to the 2011 Presidents Cup. As a secondary measure to lengthening, fairway grasses were changed to Legend Couch. This was in order to restrict the progress of the golf ball along the ground. However the Legend Couch was ultimately considered to be an inferior playing surface and has been oversown with Wintergreen Couch.

== Tournaments hosted ==
- 1896 Australian Amateur
- 1897 Australian Amateur
- 1898 Australian Amateur
- 1902 Australian Amateur
- 1905 Australian Open
- 1905 Australian Amateur
- 1905 Australian PGA Championship
- 1907 Australian Open
- 1907 Australian Amateur
- 1907 Australian PGA Championship
- 1909 Australian Open
- 1909 Australian Amateur
- 1912 Australian Open
- 1912 Australian Amateur
- 1913 Australian Open
- 1913 Australian Amateur
- 1921 Australian Open
- 1921 Australian Amateur
- 1924 Australian Open
- 1924 Australian PGA Championship
- 1924 Australian Amateur
- 1927 Australian Open
- 1927 Australian Amateur
- 1927 Australian PGA Championship
- 1933 Australian Open
- 1933 Australian Amateur
- 1933 Australian PGA Championship
- 1939 Australian Open
- 1939 Australian Amateur
- 1939 Australian PGA Championship
- 1947 Australian PGA Championship
- 1951 Australian Amateur
- 1953 Australian Open
- 1953 Australian PGA Championship
- 1959 Canada Cup
- 1961 Australian Amateur
- 1963 Australian Open
- 1965 Victorian Open
- 1965 Australian Amateur
- 1972 World Cup
- 1978 Australian PGA Championship
- 1979 Australian PGA Championship
- 1980 Australian PGA Championship
- 1981 Australian PGA Championship
- 1982 Australian PGA Championship
- 1983 Australian PGA Championship
- 1984 Australian Open
- 1985 Australian Open
- 1987 Australian Open
- 1991 Australian Open
- 1998 Presidents Cup
- 2005 Australian Amateur
- 2011 Presidents Cup
- 2012 Women's Australian Open
- 2013 Australian Masters
- 2015 Women's Australian Open
- 2019 Presidents Cup
- 2025 Australian Open

== See also ==
- List of golf clubs granted Royal status
- List of Australian organisations with royal patronage
- List of links golf courses
- Golf in Australia
