= Lists of golfers =

The following lists of golfers are arranged by gender:

- List of male golfers
- List of female golfers

== Golfers who have won a major championship or Olympic medal ==
- List of men's major championships winning golfers
  - Chronological list of men's major golf champions
- List of LPGA major championship winning golfers
  - Chronological list of LPGA major golf champions
- List of Champions Tour major championship winning golfers
- List of Olympic medalists in golf

== Golfers with the most wins on a professional golf tour ==
- List of golfers with most Asian Tour wins
- List of golfers with most Challenge Tour wins
- List of golfers with most European Tour wins
- List of golfers with most European Senior Tour wins
- List of golfers with most Japan Golf Tour wins
- List of golfers with most Ladies European Tour wins
- List of golfers with most LPGA of Japan Tour wins
- List of golfers with most LPGA Tour wins
- List of golfers with most PGA Tour wins
- List of golfers with most PGA Tour Champions wins
- List of golfers with most Korn Ferry Tour wins

== Golfers who have played in major team competitions ==
- List of American Ryder Cup golfers
- List of European Ryder Cup golfers
- List of American Presidents Cup golfers
- List of International Presidents Cup golfers
- List of American Solheim Cup golfers
- List of European Solheim Cup golfers
- List of American Walker Cup golfers
- List of Great Britain and Ireland Walker Cup golfers
- List of American Curtis Cup golfers
- List of Great Britain and Ireland Curtis Cup golfers
- List of American Arnold Palmer Cup golfers
- List of International Arnold Palmer Cup golfers
- List of American PGA Cup golfers
- List of Great Britain and Ireland PGA Cup golfers
- List of Continental Europe Seve Trophy golfers
- List of Great Britain and Ireland Seve Trophy golfers

== Others ==
- List of world number one male golfers
- List of male golfers who have been in the world top 10
