= 1998 Presidents Cup =

Golf tournament

- Dates: 11–13 December 1998
- Venue: Royal Melbourne Golf Club
- Location: Black Rock, Victoria, Australia
- Captains: Peter Thomson (International); Jack Nicklaus (USA)
International	20 1/2	11 1/2	USA
- The International team wins the Presidents Cup

Location map
- Location within Australia Location within Victoria Location within Melbourne

The 1998 Presidents Cup was held 11–13 December in Australia at the Royal Melbourne Golf Club in Black Rock, Victoria, a suburb southeast of Melbourne. The International team won the competition by a margin of 20 1/2–11 1/2. This was the first time the International team won the competition, and through 2026, is their sole victory. The honorary chairman was Australian Prime Minister John Howard. It was the third Presidents Cup competition and the first held outside the United States. The competition returned to Royal Melbourne in 2011 and 2019.

== Format ==
Both teams had 12 players plus a non-playing captain. On the first and second day foursomes were played in the morning and four-ball was played in the afternoon. On the third day only singles were played.

== Teams ==
Masashi "Jumbo" Ozaki, who was aged 51, decided not to play in the event. He finished fourth in the International team rankings. This meant that his brother, Naomichi "Joe" Ozaki, who finished 11th in the rankings, made the team automatically. Hal Sutton finished 8th in the United States rankings but withdrew in early December following the death of his father-in-law. He was replaced by Lee Janzen who was the highest ranked player not already in the team.

International team
Player	Country	Age	Points rank	OWGR	Previous appearances	Matches	W–L–H	Winning percentage
Peter Thomson	Australia	69	Non-playing captain					
Wayne Grady	Australia	41	Non-playing assistant captain					
Ernie Els	South Africa	29	1	5	1	5	3–1–1	70.00
Nick Price	Zimbabwe	41	2	6	2	9	2–5–2	33.33
Vijay Singh	Fiji	35	3	9	2	10	5–4–1	55.00
Greg Norman	Australia	43	5	18	1	5	3–2–0	60.00
Steve Elkington	Australia	36	6	16	2	10	5–4–1	55.00
Stuart Appleby	Australia	27	7	33	0	Rookie		
Carlos Franco	Paraguay	33	8	39	0	Rookie		
Shigeki Maruyama	Japan	29	9	43	0	Rookie		
Craig Parry	Australia	32	10	53	2	8	3–5–0	37.50
Naomichi "Joe" Ozaki	Japan	42	11	55	0	Rookie		
Frank Nobilo	New Zealand	38	13	60	2	10	3–6–1	35.00
Greg Turner	New Zealand	35	15	62	0	Rookie		

United States team
Player	Age	Points rank	OWGR	Previous appearances	Matches	W–L–H	Winning percentage
Jack Nicklaus	58	Non-playing captain					
Jack Nicklaus II	37	Non-playing assistant captain					
David Duval	27	1	3	1	4	4–0–0	100.00
Tiger Woods	22	2	1	0	Rookie		
Jim Furyk	28	3	12	0	Rookie		
Justin Leonard	26	4	15	1	4	1–3–0	25.00
Phil Mickelson	28	5	10	2	9	3–3–3	50.00
Davis Love III	34	6	4	2	10	7–2–1	75.00
Mark O'Meara	41	7	2	1	5	5–0–0	100.00
Scott Hoch	43	9	20	2	8	5–2–1	68.75
Mark Calcavecchia	38	10	21	0	Rookie		
Fred Couples	39	11	11	2	7	6–1–0	85.71
John Huston	37	12	29	1	4	1–3–0	25.00
Lee Janzen	34	13	23	0	Rookie		

- OWGR as of 6 December 1998, the last ranking before the Cup

== Friday's matches ==
=== Morning foursomes ===
International	Results	United States
Nobilo/Turner	1 up	O'Meara/Duval
Norman/Elkington	2 up	Furyk/Huston
Maruyama/Parry	3 & 2	Janzen/Hoch
Els/Singh	5 & 4	Woods/Couples
Appleby/Price	halved	Love/Leonard
3 1/2	Foursomes	1 1/2
3 1/2	Overall	1 1/2

=== Afternoon four-ball ===
International	Results	United States
Norman/Elkington	2 & 1	O'Meara/Furyk
Maruyama/Ozaki	4 & 3	Calcavecchia/Huston
Els/Price	halved	Duval/Mickelson
Parry/Franco	1 up	Couples/Love
Appleby/Singh	2 & 1	Leonard/Woods
3 1/2	Four-Ball	1 1/2
7	Overall	3

== Saturday's matches ==
=== Morning foursomes ===
International	Results	United States
Nobilo/Turner	2 up	Leonard/Love
Norman/Elkington	halved	Janzen/Calcavecchia
Maruyama/Parry	1 up	Woods/Couples
Appleby/Price	1 up	Duval/Mickelson
Els/Singh	6 & 4	Hoch/Furyk
4 1/2	Foursomes	1/2
11 1/2	Overall	3 1/2

=== Afternoon four-ball ===
International	Results	United States
Nobilo/Turner	1 up	O'Meara/Hoch
Els/Singh	1 up	Woods/Huston
Maruyama/Ozaki	1 up	Duval/Mickelson
Price/Franco	3 & 2	Janzen/Calcavecchia
Norman/Elkington	2 & 1	Couples/Love
3	Four-Ball	2
14 1/2	Overall	5 1/2

== Sunday's matches ==
=== Singles ===
International	Results	United States
Parry	5 & 3	Leonard
Price	2 & 1	Duval
Nobilo	4 & 2	Furyk
Franco	halved	Mickelson
Maruyama	3 & 2	Huston
Ozaki	4 & 3	Hoch
Turner	halved	Calcavecchia
Elkington	halved	Janzen
Els	1 up	Love
Singh	halved	Couples
Norman	1 up	Woods
Appleby	1 up	O'Meara
6	Singles	6
20 1/2	Overall	11 1/2

== Individual player records ==
Each entry refers to the win–loss–half record of the player.

=== International ===
Player	Points	Overall	Singles	Foursomes	Fourballs
Stuart Appleby	2.5	2–1–1	0–1–0	1–0–1	1–0–0
Steve Elkington	4	3–0–2	0–0–1	1–0–1	2–0–0
Ernie Els	3.5	3–1–1	1–0–0	1–1–0	1–0–1
Carlos Franco	0.5	0–2–1	0–0–1	0–0–0	0–2–0
Shigeki Maruyama	5	5–0–0	1–0–0	2–0–0	2–0–0
Frank Nobilo	2	2–2–0	0–1–0	2–0–0	0–1–0
Greg Norman	3.5	3–1–1	0–1–0	1–0–1	2–0–0
Naomichi Ozaki	2	2–1–0	0–1–0	0–0–0	2–0–0
Craig Parry	3	3–1–0	1–0–0	2–0–0	0–1–0
Nick Price	3	2–1–2	1–0–0	1–0–1	0–1–1
Vijay Singh	3.5	3–1–1	0–0–1	1–1–0	2–0–0
Greg Turner	2.5	2–1–1	0–0–1	2–0–0	0–1–0

=== United States ===
Player	Points	Overall	Singles	Foursomes	Fourballs
Mark Calcavecchia	2	1–1–2	0–0–1	0–0–1	1–1–0
Fred Couples	2.5	2–2–1	0–0–1	1–1–0	1–1–0
David Duval	0.5	0–4–1	0–1–0	0–2–0	0–1–1
Jim Furyk	1	1–3–0	1–0–0	0–2–0	0–1–0
Scott Hoch	2	2–2–0	1–0–0	0–2–0	1–0–0
John Huston	0	0–4–0	0–1–0	0–1–0	0–2–0
Lee Janzen	2	1–1–2	0–0–1	0–1–1	1–0–0
Justin Leonard	0.5	0–3–1	0–1–0	0–1–1	0–1–0
Davis Love III	1.5	1–3–1	0–1–0	0–1–1	1–1–0
Phil Mickelson	1	0–2–2	0–0–1	0–1–0	0–1–1
Mark O'Meara	2	2–2–0	1–0–0	0–1–0	1–1–0
Tiger Woods	2	2–3–0	1–0–0	1–1–0	0–2–0
