= 2015 Presidents Cup =

Golf match in South Korea

- Dates: 8–11 October 2015
- Venue: Jack Nicklaus Golf Club Korea
- Location: Incheon, South Korea
- Captains: Nick Price (International); Jay Haas (USA)
International	14 1/2	15 1/2	USA
- United States wins the Presidents Cup

Location map
- Location within South Korea

The 2015 Presidents Cup was the 11th Presidents Cup, played at the Jack Nicklaus Golf Club Korea in Incheon, South Korea from 8–11 October. It was the first time the Presidents Cup was played in Asia.

The United States won for the sixth successive time with a 15 1/2–14 1/2 victory over the International team, tied with the 1996 Presidents Cup (16 1/2–15 1/2) for the narrowest margin of victory.

== Course layout ==
Jack Nicklaus Golf Club Korea

Hole	1	2	3	4	5	6	7	8	9	Out	10	11	12	13	14	15	16	17	18	In	Total
Yards	426	424	591	396	170	471	560	234	452	3,724	435	430	463	207	361	572	477	202	542	3,689	7,413
Par	4	4	5	4	3	4	5	3	4	36	4	4	4	3	4	5	4	3	5	36	72

== Format ==
The format changed from previous Cup play. The first two days consisted of five matches of foursomes and five matches of fourball. The third day consisted of four matches of foursomes and four matches of fourball. The host team captain decided the order, fourball vs. foursomes, on the first three days. On the fourth and final day, twelve singles matches were played. 30 matches were played in all. All matches that are all-square after 18 holes scored 1/2 point for each team.

Each member of the teams had to play in a minimum of two matches in the first three days, a reduction from the three match minimum from 2003 to 2013.

== Team qualification and selection ==
Both teams had 12 players.

Key
Top ten on points list
Two captain's picks
Not available, in top 15 of points list
Not picked, in top 15 of points list

=== International team ===
The International team featured the top 10 players in the Official World Golf Ranking at the conclusion of the 2015 Deutsche Bank Championship on 7 September and two captain's picks. The captain's picks were announced on 8 September 2015.

The final standings were:

Position	Player	Average
1	Jason Day	11.05
2	Louis Oosthuizen	4.69
3	Adam Scott	4.57
4	Hideki Matsuyama	4.26
5	Branden Grace	3.83
6	Marc Leishman	2.91
7	Anirban Lahiri	2.66
8	Charl Schwartzel	2.61
9	Thongchai Jaidee	2.58
10	Danny Lee	2.39
11	Steven Bowditch	2.38
12	An Byeong-hun	2.29
13	John Senden	2.26
14	Matt Jones	2.19
15	George Coetzee	2.19

=== United States team ===
The United States team featured the 10 players who earn the most official FedExCup points from the 2013 BMW Championship through to the 2015 Deutsche Bank Championship, with points earned in the calendar year 2015 counting double, and two captain's picks. The captain's picks were announced on 8 September 2015.

On 2 October it was announced that Jim Furyk would not play in the Presidents Cup due to a wrist injury, and would be replaced by J. B. Holmes. Furyk served instead as an assistant captain.

The final standings were:

Position	Player	Points
1	Jordan Spieth	10,521
2	Bubba Watson	7,416
3	Jimmy Walker	6,609
4	Zach Johnson	5,838
5	Jim Furyk	5,778
6	Rickie Fowler	5,770
7	Dustin Johnson	5,532
8	Patrick Reed	5,148
9	Matt Kuchar	4,693
10	Chris Kirk	4,426
11	Bill Haas	4,140
12	J. B. Holmes	4,075
13	Charley Hoffman	4,004
14	Billy Horschel	3,956
15	Brandt Snedeker	3,913

== Teams ==
=== Captains ===
Jay Haas captained the U.S. team, and Nick Price captained the International team. Haas served as the captain's assistant for the previous three U.S. teams. Price was the International team captain in 2013.

Fred Couples, Jim Furyk, Davis Love III, and Steve Stricker were assistant captains for the U.S. team. K. J. Choi, Tony Johnstone, and Mark McNulty were assistant captains for the International team.

=== Players ===
International team
Player	Country	Age	Points rank	OWGR	Previous appearances	Matches	W–L–H	Winning percentage
Jason Day	Australia	27	1	2	2	10	4–4–2	50.00
Louis Oosthuizen	South Africa	32	2	13	1	5	1–3–1	30.00
Adam Scott	Australia	35	3	14	6	30	12–15–3	45.00
Hideki Matsuyama	Japan	23	4	15	1	5	1–3–1	30.00
Branden Grace	South Africa	27	5	22	1	4	0–4–0	0.00
Marc Leishman	Australia	31	6	37	1	4	2–2–0	50.00
Anirban Lahiri	India	28	7	39	0	Rookie		
Charl Schwartzel	South Africa	31	8	47	2	10	5–4–1	55.00
Thongchai Jaidee	Thailand	45	9	31	0	Rookie		
Danny Lee	New Zealand	25	10	36	0	Rookie		
Steven Bowditch	Australia	32	11	58	0	Rookie		
Bae Sang-moon	South Korea	29	19	88	0	Rookie		

United States team
Player	Age	Points rank	OWGR	Previous appearances	Matches	W–L–H	Winning percentage
Jordan Spieth	22	1	1	1	4	2–2–0	50.00
Bubba Watson	36	2	4	1	5	3–2–0	60.00
Jimmy Walker	36	3	17	0	Rookie		
Zach Johnson	39	4	10	3	13	7–6–0	53.85
Rickie Fowler	26	6	5	0	Rookie		
Dustin Johnson	31	7	8	1	5	1–3–1	30.00
Patrick Reed	25	8	19	0	Rookie		
Matt Kuchar	37	9	16	2	10	4–5–1	45.00
Chris Kirk	30	10	27	0	Rookie		
Bill Haas	33	11	29	2	10	3–5–2	40.00
J. B. Holmes	33	12	18	0	Rookie		
Phil Mickelson	45	30	24	10	47	20–16–11	54.26

- Captain's picks shown in yellow
- Ages as of 8 October; OWGR as of 5 October, the last ranking before the Cup

== Notables ==
Anirban Lahiri (India) and Thongchai Jaidee (Thailand) became the first representatives of their respective countries to play in the Presidents Cup. Phil Mickelson has appeared in all eleven Presidents Cups. Host country South Korea was represented with vice captain K. J. Choi, Danny Lee (who plays as a New Zealander, but was born in South Korea), and Bae Sang-moon in his last competition before his military obligation. Bill Haas was chosen for his third Presidents Cup, the most for an American without a Ryder Cup appearance.

== Thursday's foursomes matches ==
International	Results	United States
Scott/Matsuyama	3 & 2	Watson/Holmes
Oosthuizen/Grace	3 & 2	Kuchar/Reed
Lahiri/Jaidee	5 & 4	Fowler/Walker
Day/Bowditch	2 up	Mickelson/Z. Johnson
Lee/Leishman	4 & 3	Spieth/D. Johnson
1	Foursomes	4
1	Overall	4

== Friday's fourball matches ==
The American pairing of Zach Johnson and Phil Mickelson were penalised 1 hole after Mickelson played a harder ball at the par 5 7th hole, in contravention to a "one-ball condition". The one-ball condition states that a player must use the same type of ball throughout his round. The one-ball condition was in place for the fourball matches, although not for the foursomes. After his tee shot, Mickelson was incorrectly informed by a rules official that he was disqualified from the hole and Mickelson picked up his ball. The correct penalty was a loss of 1 hole, which was adjusted to the state of the match after the 7th hole. However, it was then too late for Mickelson, who could have played out the 7th hole. Jason Day won the 7th hole with a birdie 4. The match had been all square after 6 holes but, with the International pair winning the 7th hole and with the 1 hole penalty, the International pair became 2 up after 7 holes. The match ended up all square.

International	Results	United States
Oosthuizen/Grace	4 & 3	D. Johnson/Spieth
Lee/Bae	1 up	Fowler/Walker
Scott/Day	halved	Z. Johnson/Mickelson
Leishman/Bowditch	2 up	Holmes/Watson
Jaidee/Schwartzel	2 & 1	Haas/Kirk
3 1/2	Fourball	1 1/2
4 1/2	Overall	5 1/2

== Saturday's matches ==
=== Morning foursomes ===
International	Results	United States
Oosthuizen/Grace	3 & 2	Reed/Fowler
Scott/Leishman	halved	Watson/Holmes
Bae/Matsuyama	halved	Haas/Kuchar
Day/Schwartzel	1 up	D. Johnson/Spieth
2	Foursomes	2
6 1/2	Overall	7 1/2

=== Afternoon fourball ===
By winning their match, Louis Oosthuizen and Branden Grace became the first International pair to win four matches, playing together, in a Presidents Cup match. Steve Stricker and Tiger Woods, in 2009, were previously the only pair to have achieved this.

International	Results	United States
Oosthuizen/Grace	1 up	Holmes/Watson
Scott/Lahiri	3 & 2	Mickelson/Z. Johnson
Bae/Matsuyama	6 & 5	Walker/Kirk
Day/Schwartzel	3 & 2	Reed/Spieth
2	Fourball	2
8 1/2	Overall	9 1/2

== Sunday's singles matches ==
The United States won the Presidents Cup for the sixth straight time, defeating the International team 15 1/2 to 14 1/2. American Bill Haas, the son of team captain Jay Haas, clinched the victory on the final hole of the final match. With Haas 1 up, Bae needed to win the 18th to halve the match and the Presidents Cup. Bae mishit his third shot, a chip, and then missed his fourth shot. Haas then hit his third shot, from a bunker, to 6 feet and Bae conceded the match. Earlier Branden Grace has won his singles match, becoming only the fifth player to win five matches in a Presidents Cup match. In the 2013 Presidents Cup he had lost all four of his matches.

International	Results	United States	Timetable
Oosthuizen	halved	Reed	2nd: 10–10
Scott	6 & 5	Fowler	1st: 9 1/2–9 1/2
Lee	2 & 1	D. Johnson	3rd: 10–11
Matsuyama	1 up	Holmes	5th: 11–12
Jaidee	halved	Watson	6th: 11 1/2–12 1/2
Bowditch	2 up	Walker	7th: 12 1/2–12 1/2
Schwartzel	5 & 4	Mickelson	4th: 10–12
Lahiri	1 up	Kirk	8th: 12 1/2–13 1/2
Leishman	1 up	Spieth	10th: 13 1/2–14 1/2
Day	3 & 2	Z. Johnson	9th: 12 1/2–14 1/2
Grace	2 & 1	Kuchar	11th: 14 1/2–14 1/2
Bae	2 up	Haas	12th: 14 1/2–15 1/2
6	Singles	6	
14 1/2	Overall	15 1/2	

== Individual player records ==
Each entry refers to the win–loss–half record of the player.

=== International ===
Player	Points	Overall	Singles	Foursomes	Fourballs
Bae Sang-moon	2.5	2–1–1	0–1–0	0–0–1	2–0–0
Steven Bowditch	1	1–2–0	1–0–0	0–1–0	0–1–0
Jason Day	0.5	0–4–1	0–1–0	0–2–0	0–1–1
Branden Grace	5	5–0–0	1–0–0	2–0–0	2–0–0
Thongchai Jaidee	1.5	1–1–1	0–0–1	0–1–0	1–0–0
Anirban Lahiri	0	0–3–0	0–1–0	0–1–0	0–1–0
Danny Lee	1	1–2–0	0–1–0	0–1–0	1–0–0
Marc Leishman	1.5	1–2–1	1–0–0	0–1–1	0–1–0
Hideki Matsuyama	2.5	2–1–1	1–0–0	0–1–1	1–0–0
Louis Oosthuizen	4.5	4–0–1	0–0–1	2–0–0	2–0–0
Charl Schwartzel	1	1–3–0	0–1–0	0–1–0	1–1–0
Adam Scott	2	1–2–2	1–0–0	0–1–1	0–1–1

=== United States ===
Player	Points	Overall	Singles	Foursomes	Fourballs
Rickie Fowler	1	1–3–0	0–1–0	1–1–0	0–1–0
Bill Haas	1.5	1–1–1	1–0–0	0–0–1	0–1–0
J. B. Holmes	2.5	2–2–1	0–1–0	1–0–1	1–1–0
Dustin Johnson	3	3–1–0	1–0–0	2–0–0	0–1–0
Zach Johnson	3.5	3–0–1	1–0–0	1–0–0	1–0–1
Chris Kirk	1	1–2–0	1–0–0	0–0–0	0–2–0
Matt Kuchar	0.5	0–2–1	0–1–0	0–1–1	0–0–0
Phil Mickelson	3.5	3–0–1	1–0–0	1–0–0	1–0–1
Patrick Reed	1.5	1–2–1	0–0–1	0–2–0	1–0–0
Jordan Spieth	3	3–2–0	0–1–0	2–0–0	1–1–0
Jimmy Walker	1	1–3–0	0–1–0	1–0–0	0–2–0
Bubba Watson	3	2–1–2	0–0–1	1–0–1	1–1–0
