= 2019 Presidents Cup =

Golf tournament

- Dates: 12–15 December
- Venue: Royal Melbourne Golf Club
- Location: Melbourne, Victoria, Australia
- Captains: Ernie Els (International); Tiger Woods (USA)
International	14	16	USA
- United States wins the Presidents Cup

Location map
- Location within Australia Location within Victoria Location within Melbourne

The 2019 Presidents Cup was the 13th edition of the Presidents Cup golf competition, held at Royal Melbourne Golf Club in Melbourne, Victoria, from 12 to 15 December 2019. Royal Melbourne previously hosted the tournament in 1998, at which the International team had their only victory, and 2011.

The United States retained the cup, winning the competition 16–14. Trailing before the final day singles matches, they won six and tied four of the 12 matches.

== Team qualification and selection ==
Both teams had 12 players. On 18 August 2019, the eight automatic qualifiers for each team were finalized.

Key
Top eight on points list
Four captain's picks
Not available, in top 15 of points list
Not picked, in top 15 of points list

=== International team ===
The International team featured the top 8 players with the most Official World Golf Ranking points accumulated between 27 August 2018 (Dell Technologies Championship) and 18 August 2019 (BMW Championship) and four captain's picks made in early November. This was a change from 2017 when selection was based on the leading players in the Official World Golf Ranking. The number of captain's picks was also increased from two to four.

The final standings were:

Position	Player	Points
1	Marc Leishman	192.94
2	Hideki Matsuyama	187.11
3	Louis Oosthuizen	184.68
4	Adam Scott	180.30
5	Abraham Ancer	160.39
6	Li Haotong	128.63
7	Pan Cheng-tsung	125.77
8	Cameron Smith	124.17
9	Jason Day	120.57
10	Jazz Janewattananond	113.86
11	Im Sung-jae	112.04
12	Justin Harding	109.67
13	Corey Conners	102.34
14	Shugo Imahira	100.47
15	An Byeong-hun	97.26

=== United States team ===
The United States team featured the 8 players who earned the most official FedExCup points from the 2017 BMW Championship through the 2019 BMW Championship, with points earned in the 2018–19 season counting double, and four captain's picks. Points for events in the FedEx Cup Playoffs were weighted the same as WGC events. The four captain's picks were made in early November. In 2017 only events in the 2017 calendar year counted double. As with the international team the number of captain's picks was increased from two to four.

The final standings were:

Position	Player	Points
1	Brooks Koepka	8,310
2	Justin Thomas	6,949
3	Dustin Johnson	6,643
4	Patrick Cantlay	5,898
5	Xander Schauffele	5,753
6	Webb Simpson	5,532
7	Matt Kuchar	5,520
8	Bryson DeChambeau	5,341
9	Tony Finau	5,152
10	Gary Woodland	4,964
11	Rickie Fowler	4,678
12	Patrick Reed	4,510
13	Tiger Woods	3,905
14	Chez Reavie	3,810
15	Kevin Kisner	3,670

== Teams ==
=== Captains ===
Tiger Woods captained the U.S. team, and Ernie Els captained the International team.

Woods chose Fred Couples, Zach Johnson and Steve Stricker as his assistants. Els chose K. J. Choi, Geoff Ogilvy, Trevor Immelman and Mike Weir as his assistants.

Woods was the first playing captain in a Presidents Cup since Hale Irwin in 1994.

=== Players ===
International team
Player	Country	Age	Points rank	OWGR	Previous appearances	Matches	W–L–T	Winning percentage
Marc Leishman	Australia	36	1	28	3	13	3–7–3	34.62
Hideki Matsuyama	Japan	27	2	21	3	13	4–6–3	42.31
Louis Oosthuizen	South Africa	37	3	20	3	15	7–5–3	56.67
Adam Scott	Australia	39	4	18	8	39	14–20–5	42.31
Abraham Ancer	Mexico	28	5	39	0	Rookie		
Li Haotong	China	24	6	65	0	Rookie		
Pan Cheng-tsung	Chinese Taipei	28	7	64	0	Rookie		
Cameron Smith	Australia	26	8	52	0	Rookie		
Im Sung-jae	South Korea	21	11	36	0	Rookie		
An Byeong-hun	South Korea	28	15	42	0	Rookie		
Adam Hadwin	Canada	32	18	48	1	3	0–2–1	16.67
Joaquín Niemann	Chile	21	28	56	0	Rookie		

United States team
Player	Age	Points rank	OWGR	Previous appearances	Matches	W–L–T	Winning percentage
Justin Thomas	26	2	4	1	5	3–1–1	70.00
Dustin Johnson	35	3	5	3	14	8–4–2	64.29
Patrick Cantlay	27	4	7	0	Rookie		
Xander Schauffele	26	5	9	0	Rookie		
Webb Simpson	34	6	11	2	10	5–3–2	60.00
Matt Kuchar	41	7	24	4	16	6–8–2	43.75
Bryson DeChambeau	26	8	13	0	Rookie		
Tony Finau	30	9	16	0	Rookie		
Gary Woodland	35	10	17	0	Rookie		
Rickie Fowler	30	11	22	2	8	4–3–1	56.25
Patrick Reed	29	12	12	2	9	4–3–2	55.56
Tiger Woods – captain	43	13	6	8	40	24–15–1	61.25

- Brooks Koepka originally made the U.S. team but withdrew with a knee injury. He was replaced by Fowler.
- Jason Day was originally a captain's pick for the International team but withdrew with a back injury. He was replaced by An.
- Captain's picks shown in yellow
- Ages as of 12 December; OWGR as of 8 December, the last ranking before the Cup

=== Notables ===
Abraham Ancer (Mexico), Li Haotong (China), Joaquín Niemann (Chile) and Pan Cheng-tsung (Chinese Taipei) became the first players of their respective countries to play in the Presidents Cup.

This was also the first Presidents Cup without Phil Mickelson.

== Broadcast ==
Golf Channel had the official coverage of the 2019 Presidents Cup in the United States.

== Thursday's fourball matches ==
Despite losing the opening match, the International team won the session 4–1. This was just the fourth time that the International team had led after the opening session of a Presidents Cup match and the 3 point lead was the largest it had ever had after the opening session.

International	Results	United States
Niemann/Leishman	4 & 3	Woods/Thomas
Im/Hadwin	1 up	Cantlay/Schauffele
An/Scott	2 & 1	Finau/DeChambeau
Pan/Matsuyama	1 up	Reed/Simpson
Oosthuizen/Ancer	4 & 3	Woodland/Johnson
4	Fourball	1
4	Overall	1

== Friday's foursomes matches ==
The International team looked like they would extend their lead but the United States had good finishes in three of the matches to leave the session tied. Patrick Cantlay and Xander Schauffele birdied the final hole to win their match against Joaquín Niemann and Adam Hadwin and later Tiger Woods and Justin Thomas did the same against Hideki Matsuyama and An Byeong-hun. In the final match, Rickie Fowler and Gary Woodland tied their match against Cameron Smith and Im Sung-jae after being two down with three holes to play.

International	Results	United States
Scott/Oosthuizen	3 & 2	Kuchar/Johnson
Niemann/Hadwin	1 up	Cantlay/Schauffele
Ancer/Leishman	3 & 2	Reed/Simpson
Matsuyama/An	1 up	Woods/Thomas
Smith/Im	tied	Fowler/Woodland
2 1/2	Foursomes	2 1/2
6 1/2	Overall	3 1/2

== Saturday's matches ==
=== Morning fourball ===
The International team extended their lead to four points with two wins and a tie in the four matches. An Byeong-hun and Adam Scott had taken a one-hole lead at the 15th hole against Tony Finau and Matt Kuchar but Finau won the final hole with a birdie 3 to tie the match.

International	Results	United States
Li/Leishman	3 & 2	Fowler/Thomas
Ancer/Im	3 & 2	Cantlay/Schauffele
Pan/Matsuyama	5 & 3	Simpson/Reed
An/Scott	tied	Finau/Kuchar
2 1/2	Fourball	1 1/2
9	Overall	5

=== Afternoon foursomes ===
At one stage the United States led in all four matches but the International team recovered to tie two of the matches. Rickie Fowler and Justin Thomas were 5 up after 7 holes against Abraham Ancer and Marc Leishman and were still 5 up with 8 holes to play. However Ancer and Leishman tied the match, winning the last three holes. Joaquín Niemann and An Byeong-hun also came from behind to tie their match against Tony Finau and Matt Kuchar, giving the International team a two-point lead at the start of the final day.

International	Results	United States
Scott/Oosthuizen	2 & 1	Woodland/Johnson
Ancer/Leishman	tied	Fowler/Thomas
Im/Smith	2 & 1	Cantlay/Schauffele
Niemann/An	tied	Finau/Kuchar
1	Foursomes	3
10	Overall	8

== Sunday's singles matches ==
Tiger Woods played the first match for the US and made 7 birdies in 16 holes to defeat Abraham Ancer. Woods, with a 3–0–0 record, was the only player without a loss or tie in the competition. Down by two points at the start of the day, the US took six of the singles matches and rallied to win by a score of 16–14. This was the eighth straight Presidents Cup victory for the US.

International	Results	United States	Timetable
Abraham Ancer	3 & 2	Tiger Woods	1st: 10–9
Hideki Matsuyama	tied	Tony Finau	4th: 10.5–11.5
Pan Cheng-tsung	4 & 2	Patrick Reed	3rd: 10–11
Li Haotong	4 & 3	Dustin Johnson	2nd: 10–10
Adam Hadwin	tied	Bryson DeChambeau	6th: 12–12
Im Sung-jae	4 & 3	Gary Woodland	5th: 11.5–11.5
Joaquín Niemann	3 & 2	Patrick Cantlay	7th: 12–13
Adam Scott	2 & 1	Xander Schauffele	8th: 12–14
An Byeong-hun	2 & 1	Webb Simpson	9th: 12–15
Cameron Smith	2 & 1	Justin Thomas	10th: 13–15
Louis Oosthuizen	tied	Matt Kuchar	11th: 13.5–15.5
Marc Leishman	tied	Rickie Fowler	12th: 14–16
4	Singles	8
14	Overall	16

== Individual player records ==
Each entry refers to the win–loss–tie record of the player.

=== International ===
Player	Points	Overall	Singles	Foursomes	Fourballs
An Byeong-hun	2	1–2–2	0–1–0	0–1–1	1–0–1
Abraham Ancer	3.5	3–1–1	0–1–0	1–0–1	2–0–0
Adam Hadwin	1.5	1–1–1	0–0–1	0–1–0	1–0–0
Im Sung-jae	3.5	3–1–1	1–0–0	0–1–1	2–0–0
Marc Leishman	2	1–2–2	0–0–1	1–0–1	0–2–0
Li Haotong	0	0–2–0	0–1–0	0–0–0	0–1–0
Hideki Matsuyama	2.5	2–1–1	0–0–1	0–1–0	2–0–0
Joaquín Niemann	0.5	0–3–1	0–1–0	0–1–1	0–1–0
Louis Oosthuizen	2.5	2–1–1	0–0–1	1–1–0	1–0–0
Pan Cheng-tsung	2	2–1–0	0–1–0	0–0–0	2–0–0
Adam Scott	2.5	2–2–1	0–1–0	1–1–0	1–0–1
Cameron Smith	1.5	1–1–1	1–0–0	0–1–1	0–0–0

=== United States ===
Player	Points	Overall	Singles	Foursomes	Fourballs
Patrick Cantlay	3	3–2–0	1–0–0	2–0–0	0–2–0
Bryson DeChambeau	0.5	0–1–1	0–0–1	0–0–0	0–1–0
Tony Finau	1.5	0–1–3	0–0–1	0–0–1	0–1–1
Rickie Fowler	2.5	1–0–3	0–0–1	0–0–2	1–0–0
Dustin Johnson	2	2–2–0	1–0–0	1–1–0	0–1–0
Matt Kuchar	1.5	0–1–3	0–0–1	0–1–1	0–0–1
Patrick Reed	1	1–3–0	1–0–0	0–1–0	0–2–0
Xander Schauffele	3	3–2–0	1–0–0	2–0–0	0–2–0
Webb Simpson	1	1–3–0	1–0–0	0–1–0	0–2–0
Justin Thomas	3.5	3–1–1	0–1–0	1–0–1	2–0–0
Gary Woodland	1.5	1–2–1	0–1–0	1–0–1	0–1–0
Tiger Woods	3	3–0–0	1–0–0	1–0–0	1–0–0
