= 2003 Presidents Cup =

Golf match in South Africa

- Dates: 20–23 November 2003
- Venue: Fancourt Hotel and Country Club; Links Course
- Location: George, Western Cape, South Africa
- Captains: Gary Player (International); Jack Nicklaus (USA)
International	17	17	USA
- A Tie in the Presidents Cup

Location map
- Location within South Africa Location within Western Cape

The 2003 Presidents Cup was held 20–23 November 2003 at the Links Course at Fancourt Hotel and Country Club in George, Western Cape, South Africa. The United States and International team tied the competition 17–17, and after three tied playoff holes between Tiger Woods and Ernie Els, it was decided that the Cup would be shared by agreement of the captains and players. The honorary chairman was South African President Thabo Mbeki. The event was originally scheduled to be held in autumn 2002 before the 2001 Ryder Cup was postponed to 2002 due to the September 11 attacks in the United States.

== Format ==
Both teams had 12 players and a non-playing captain. The competition was four days long with 34 matches worth a single point each. Six foursome matches were played on the first day. On the second day, five four-ball matches were played in the morning and five foursome matches were played in the afternoon. On the third day, six four-ball matches were played. The competition concluded with twelve singles matches on the final day.

== Teams ==
International team
Player	Country	Age	Points rank	OWGR	Previous appearances	Matches	W–L–H	Winning percentage
Gary Player	South Africa	68	Non-playing captain					
Ian Baker-Finch	Australia	43	Non-playing assistant captain					
Ernie Els	South Africa	34	1	3	3	15	6–7–2	46.67
Vijay Singh	Fiji	40	2	2	4	20	9–9–2	50.00
Mike Weir	Canada	33	3	6	1	5	3–2–0	60.00
Nick Price	Zimbabwe	46	4	12	4	19	6–9–4	42.11
Retief Goosen	South Africa	34	5	7	1	5	2–3–0	40.00
Robert Allenby	Australia	32	6	18	3	14	4–10–0	28.57
Stephen Leaney	Australia	34	7	35	0	Rookie		
Peter Lonard	Australia	36	8	40	0	Rookie		
Adam Scott	Australia	23	9	22	0	Rookie		
Stuart Appleby	Australia	32	10	15	2	7	2–4–1	35.71
K. J. Choi	South Korea	33	11	19	0	Rookie		
Tim Clark	South Africa	27	16	70	0	Rookie		

United States team
Player	Age	Points rank	OWGR	Previous appearances	Matches	W–L–H	Winning percentage
Jack Nicklaus	63	Non-playing captain					
Jeff Sluman	46	Non-playing assistant captain					
Tiger Woods	27	1	1	2	10	5–5–0	50.00
Davis Love III	39	2	4	4	19	12–5–2	68.42
Jim Furyk	33	3	5	2	8	4–4–0	50.00
David Toms	36	4	9	0	Rookie		
Kenny Perry	43	5	8	1	4	2–2–0	50.00
Phil Mickelson	33	6	13	4	18	6–7–5	47.22
Justin Leonard	31	7	16	2	8	1–6–1	18.75
Chris DiMarco	35	8	28	0	Rookie		
Jerry Kelly	36	9	30	0	Rookie		
Charles Howell III	24	10	21	0	Rookie		
Fred Funk	47	11	34	0	Rookie		
Jay Haas	49	12	26	1	5	3–2–0	60.00

- OWGR as of 16 November 2003, the last ranking before the Cup

== Thursday's matches ==
All matches played were foursomes.

International	Results	United States
Price/Weir	1 up	Toms/Mickelson
Goosen/Singh	3 & 2	DiMarco/Kelly
Lonard/Clark	4 & 2	Love/Perry
Els/Scott	1 up	Leonard/Furyk
Allenby/Leaney	halved	Haas/Funk
Appleby/Choi	4 & 3	Woods/Howell
3 1/2	Foursomes	2 1/2
3 1/2	Overall	2 1/2

== Friday's matches ==
=== Morning four-ball ===
International	Results	United States
Allenby/Weir	3 & 1	Mickelson/Toms
Goosen/Choi	2 & 1	Perry/Love
Appleby/Scott	6 & 5	Furyk/Haas
Singh/Price	1 up	DiMarco/Leonard
Els/Clark	5 & 3	Woods/Howell
2	Four-Ball	3
5 1/2	Overall	5 1/2

=== Afternoon foursomes ===
International	Results	United States
Choi/Lonard	2 & 1	Perry/Kelly
Allenby/Leaney	4 & 3	Funk/Toms
Clark/Goosen	1 up	Woods/Howell
Els/Scott	1 up	DiMarco/Mickelson
Singh/Weir	5 & 4	Furyk/Leonard
1	Foursomes	4
6 1/2	Overall	9 1/2

== Saturday's matches ==
All matches played were four-ball.

International	Results	United States
Lonard/Leaney	2 & 1	Funk/Mickelson
Els/Clark	3 & 2	Furyk/Haas
Scott/Choi	5 & 4	Perry/Kelly
Singh/Goosen	2 & 1	Woods/Howell
Weir/Allenby	1 up	DiMarco/Leonard
Price/Appleby	2 & 1	Love/Toms
6	Four-Ball	0
12 1/2	Overall	9 1/2

== Sunday's matches ==
=== Singles ===
International	Results	United States
Weir	3 & 1	Furyk
Clark	1 up	Kelly
Price	1 up	Perry
Choi	4 & 2	Leonard
Scott	5 & 4	Howell
Leaney	4 & 3	Haas
Goosen	2 & 1	Mickelson
Lonard	4 & 3	Funk
Appleby	1 up	DiMarco
Singh	4 & 3	Toms
Els	4 & 3	Woods
Allenby	halved	Love
4 1/2	Singles	7 1/2
17	Overall	17

== Individual player records ==
Each entry refers to the win–loss–half record of the player.

=== International ===
Player	Points	Overall	Singles	Foursomes	Fourballs
Robert Allenby	3	2–1–2	0–0–1	0–1–1	2–0–0
Stuart Appleby	1	1–3–0	0–1–0	0–1–0	1–1–0
K. J. Choi	2	2–3–0	1–0–0	0–2–0	1–1–0
Tim Clark	2	2–3–0	0–1–0	0–2–0	2–0–0
Ernie Els	4	4–1–0	0–1–0	2–0–0	2–0–0
Retief Goosen	3	3–2–0	1–0–0	1–1–0	1–1–0
Stephen Leaney	1.5	1–2–1	0–1–0	0–1–1	1–0–0
Peter Lonard	2	2–2–0	1–0–0	0–2–0	1–0–0
Nick Price	2	2–2–0	0–1–0	1–0–0	1–1–0
Adam Scott	3	3–2–0	0–1–0	2–0–0	1–1–0
Vijay Singh	3	3–2–0	1–0–0	1–1–0	1–1–0
Mike Weir	3	3–2–0	0–1–0	1–1–0	2–0–0

=== United States ===
Player	Points	Overall	Singles	Foursomes	Fourballs
Chris DiMarco	2	2–3–0	1–0–0	0–2–0	1–1–0
Fred Funk	1.5	1–2–1	0–1–0	1–0–1	0–1–0
Jim Furyk	3	3–2–0	1–0–0	1–1–0	1–1–0
Jay Haas	2.5	2–1–1	1–0–0	0–0–1	1–1–0
Charles Howell III	3	3–2–0	1–0–0	2–0–0	0–2–0
Jerry Kelly	2	2–2–0	1–0–0	1–1–0	0–1–0
Justin Leonard	2	2–3–0	0–1–0	1–1–0	1–1–0
Davis Love III	2.5	2–1–1	0–0–1	1–0–0	1–1–0
Phil Mickelson	0	0–5–0	0–1–0	0–2–0	0–2–0
Kenny Perry	4	4–1–0	1–0–0	2–0–0	1–1–0
David Toms	1	1–4–0	0–1–0	1–1–0	0–2–0
Tiger Woods	3	3–2–0	1–0–0	2–0–0	0–2–0
