= 2011 Presidents Cup =

Golf match in Australia

- Dates: 17–20 November 2011
- Venue: Royal Melbourne Golf Club
- Location: Black Rock, Victoria, Australia
- Captains: Greg Norman (International); Fred Couples (USA)
International	15	19	USA
- United States wins the Presidents Cup

Location map
- Location within Australia Location within Victoria Location within Melbourne

The 2011 Presidents Cup was the ninth Presidents Cup, held 17–20 November in Australia at the Royal Melbourne Golf Club in Black Rock, Victoria, a suburb southeast of Melbourne. The United States team won by a score of 19 to 15 over the International team. Jim Furyk won all five of his matches.

== Format ==
The first day consisted of six matches of foursomes, the second day had six matches of fourball. The third day consisted of five matches of foursomes in the morning and five matches of fourball in the afternoon. On the fourth and final day, twelve singles matches were played. 34 matches were played in all.

== Teams ==
Both teams had 12 players plus a non-playing captain. Members of the U.S. Team were selected based on official PGA Tour earnings from the 2009 Wyndham Championship through the 2011 BMW Championship. Prize money in 2011 events counted double. International Team players were chosen on the basis of the Official World Golf Ranking through the 2011 BMW Championship. The International Team did not include players eligible for the European Ryder Cup Team. The top 10 players from each list made their respective teams and the captains choose the remaining two players.

International team
Player	Country	Age	Points rank	OWGR	Previous appearances	Matches	W–L–H	Winning percentage
Greg Norman	Australia	56	Non-playing captain					
Tim Clark	South Africa	35	Non-playing assistant captain					
Frank Nobilo	New Zealand	51	Non-playing assistant captain					
Jason Day	Australia	24	1	8	0	Rookie		
Adam Scott	Australia	31	2	7	4	20	8–10–2	45.00
Charl Schwartzel	South Africa	27	3	13	0	Rookie		
K. J. Choi	South Korea	41	4	15	2	9	3–6–0	33.33
Kim Kyung-tae	South Korea	25	5	24	0	Rookie		
Retief Goosen	South Africa	42	6	51	5	24	11–10–3	52.08
Geoff Ogilvy	Australia	34	7	38	2	9	4–5–0	44.44
Ernie Els	South Africa	42	8	52	6	30	16–12–2	56.67
Yang Yong-eun	South Korea	39	9	43	1	5	2–2–1	50.00
Ryo Ishikawa	Japan	20	10	49	1	5	3–2–0	60.00
Robert Allenby	Australia	40	13	69	5	24	8–13–3	39.58
Aaron Baddeley	Australia	30	14	47	0	Rookie		

United States team
Player	Age	Points rank	OWGR	Previous appearances	Matches	W–L–H	Winning percentage
Fred Couples	52	Non-playing captain					
John Cook	54	Non-playing assistant captain					
Jay Haas	57	Non-playing assistant captain					
Matt Kuchar	33	1	10	0	Rookie		
Steve Stricker	44	2	5	3	15	9–6–0	60.00
Dustin Johnson	27	3	6	0	Rookie		
Webb Simpson	26	4	9	0	Rookie		
Nick Watney	30	5	11	0	Rookie		
Phil Mickelson	41	6	12	8	38	15–13–10	52.63
Bubba Watson	33	7	17	0	Rookie		
David Toms	44	8	20	3	14	6–7–1	46.43
Hunter Mahan	29	9	19	2	9	4–4–1	50.00
Jim Furyk	41	10	41	6	28	15–10–3	58.93
Bill Haas	29	12	22	0	Rookie		
Tiger Woods	35	29	50	6	30	18–11–1	61.67

- OWGR as of 13 November 2011, the last ranking before the Cup.

== Thursday's foursome matches ==
Greg Norman selected his first pair and Fred Couples selected his pair to play against them. For the second match Couples made the first selection, Norman the second. This process continued until only the last two pairs remain. Media interest centred on the pairing of Adam Scott and his caddy Steve Williams with Tiger Woods; Williams having been Woods caddy for many years. All matches were in alternate shot format.

There were some dramatic lead changes throughout the first day. The International team was off to a fast start and at one point led in 5 of the 6 matches. But in the middle of the round the Americans bounced back. Watson/Simpson were 2 down after 4 holes to Els/Ishikawa but won 6 of the next 11 holes to win 4 & 3. Haas/Watney trailed the International team Schwartzel/Ogilvy, 2 down, throughout the round but won holes 15 and 16 to halve the match. Johnson/Kuchar also claimed a very crucial half-point for their matches by winning the last two holes in their match, when the Internationals missed an 8-foot par putt on 17 and then hit an erratic drive on 18, resulting in a halve in the match despite the Internationals being 3 up at one point. Mickelson/Furyk were 1 down after 6 holes to Goosen/Allenby but won 5 of their next 6 holes to win the match 4 & 3. Toms/Mahan grabbed the lead over Kim/Yang early in the match and never relinquished it, winning 6 & 5. However, biggest surprise of the day was the anchor match when Scott and K.J. Choi beat Woods and Stricker 7 & 6, tying the record for largest margin of defeat in the short history in the Presidents Cup in what was the International team's only win of the day.

By winning his match Phil Mickelson became the leading points scorer in the Presidents Cup with 21, passing Vijay Singh's record of 20.5.

International	Results	United States
Els/Ishikawa	4 & 2	Watson/Simpson
Ogilvy/Schwartzel	halved	Haas/Watney
Baddeley/Day	halved	Johnson/Kuchar
Goosen/Allenby	4 & 3	Mickelson/Furyk
Kim/Yang	6 & 5	Mahan/Toms
Scott/Choi	7 & 6	Woods/Stricker
2	Foursomes	4
2	Overall	4

== Friday's four-ball matches ==
The pairings were made in the same way as the Thursday foursomes except that Couples made the first choice.

All matches were in fourball format. Tee times were brought forward by two hours because of the threat of storms later in the day. The first match started at 9:35am local time.

The course played very difficult due to the firm greens and the very blustery conditions, which were very different from the calm conditions on Thursday. Very few birdies were made and a lot of times holes were won with pars. Unlike the first day, there were no dramatic changes in lead, as almost all matches in which one side got a lead on maintained the lead throughout the match. The exception was the Woods/Johnson match, in which they grabbed an early 1 up lead but squandered it and eventually Baddeley/Day won. Woods/Johnson played better than the International team Baddeley/Day tee-to-green but the Internationals were able to keep pace with their stellar short game. The Internationals dodged a major bullet on the first hole when they made a 10-foot par putt and then Woods missed a 6-foot birdie. The Americans took the lead with a 25-foot birdie putt on the 4th but squandered it with a bogey on the 8th. Then Day/Baddeley took the lead for good on 13 with a 20-foot birdie putt. They dodged a few more bullets when Woods's 70 foot eagle putt on 15 missed by a few inches, Johnson's inability to convert his 6-foot birdie putt on 16, and when Woods's chip shot on 18 missed by a few inches. By the end of day two, K.J. Choi was the only International team member with 2 points, but the more shocking development was that Tiger Woods was the only player in the American team with no points.

International	Results	United States
Els/Ishikawa	2 & 1	Watson/Simpson
Day/Baddeley	1 up	Woods/Johnson
Scott/Kim	2 & 1	Mickelson/Furyk
Ogilvy/Choi	1 up	Haas/Watney
Yang/Allenby	4 & 3	Stricker/Kuchar
Schwartzel/Goosen	2 & 1	Mahan/Toms
3	Fourball	3
5	Overall	7

== Saturday's matches ==
=== Morning foursomes ===
The weather for the day was calm winds with a light rain, so the course was much easier and the greens were a lot more receptive with the rain. The American team was in cruise control for the whole morning session, and never at any point did the Internationals lead in more than one match. Watson/Simpson got off to a quick start winning the first two holes, but the Allenby/Ogilvy bounced back to square the match before the Americans closed them out by winning three of their last five holes. Haas/Kuchar also got off to a quick start with an early 2 up lead but Els/Ishikawa would catch up to them on the back nine to win the only International victory of the morning. The Mahan/Toms team was in cruise control for the last 10 holes when they won 6 of those holes to go from 1 down to a 5 & 4 victory over Goosen/Schwartzel. Woods/Johnson got off to a slow start due to putting woes, and were 1 down after 6, but they bounced back to win when the Scott/Choi struggled. Mickelson/Furyk also struggled with their putting and were 2 down after 10 holes but Furyk stepped up big on the back nine and they won four of their next five holes to beat Baddeley/Day.

International	Results	United States
Allenby/Ogilvy	3 & 2	Simpson/Watson
Els/Ishikawa	1 up	Haas/Kuchar
Goosen/Schwartzel	5 & 4	Mahan/Toms
Scott/Choi	3 & 2	Woods/Johnson
Baddeley/Day	2 & 1	Mickelson/Furyk
1	Foursomes	4
6	Overall	11

=== Afternoon four-ball ===
The Internationals got off to a very good start in the four-ball session. The Watson/Simpson team, despite a perfect 3–0 record, struggled this session and were unable to make many birdies and lost to Goosen/Schwartzel 2 & 1. Woods/Johnson once again struggled with their putting and never led in their match against Kim/Yang. It looked like the Americans were going to lead the match when Woods found the green in two on the par-5 15th, but he three-putted from 70 feet, and Woods had two more birdie opportunities on 17 and 18 to square the match but missed both. Stricker/Kuchar and Ogilvy/Choi played very consistently in their match, halving 15 of the 18 holes. Stricker/Kuchar got an early lead but Ogilvy/Choi won two holes from then to win the match, 1 up. Both Mahan/Haas and Furyk/Watney were in control for their matches most of the time and won their matches by a small margin.

International	Results	United States
Goosen/Schwartzel	2 & 1	Simpson/Watson
Kim/Yang	1 up	Woods/Johnson
Ogilvy/Choi	1 up	Stricker/Kuchar
Baddeley/Day	2 & 1	Mahan/Haas
Scott/Els	1 up	Furyk/Watney
3	Four-ball	2
9	Overall	13

== Sunday's singles matches ==
The Internationals got off to the start they wanted in effort for a miraculous comeback by winning the first four matches. Underdog Kim got off to a fast start, and was 3 up over Simpson after 9 holes. Simpson came back, and squared the matches with two holes to play. Kim stepped up for the Internationals, and sank a 12-foot birdie on 17, followed by a 6-foot par on 18 to win the match. Schwartzel and Ishikawa took control of their opponents Johnson and Watson, respectively, early in the match and never relinquished their leads. Ogilvy and Haas both fought hard in their match, and made clutch putts until the end, where Ogilvy prevailed after Haas hit an errant drive on 18.

Jason Day, the local favorite, was out-of-sorts all day, shooting nine over par on the front nine, and was 5 down to Hunter Mahan after 9 holes. He eventually lost to Mahan, 5 & 3. Watney won his match against Choi through consistent play. Mickelson, who was 3-0 prior to the Sunday singles, and had played exceptionally well with his teammate Furyk the first three days, struggled out of the gate, making bogeys on the first five holes to go four down to Adam Scott. Scott maintained his 4 up lead, but Mickelson rebounded by winning holes 15 and 16 with birdies. Mickelson nearly made his 12-foot birdie on 17 to extend the match, but, Scott prevailed when Mickelson missed the putt. Goosen, who was a very low-key player for the International team all week, quietly grabbed his third point for the Internationals with a win over Kuchar. Goosen was 3 up after 11 holes, but Kuchar won three holes in a row to square the match. He took the lead for good when Kuchar missed a 12-foot par putt on 16, and held on to win the match.

Captain Couples put Presidents Cup veterans Furyk, Toms, Woods, and Stricker in the last four matches, and his decision paid off as all four of the Americans won their matches. Furyk played solidly all day, winning his match over Els to earn a perfect 5–0–0 record for the week. Allenby, a controversial captain's pick for the Internationals, struggled all week, and continued again in his match against Toms, losing 7 & 5. Allenby was the only player from both teams to earn no points all week. Woods, who struggled with his putting in his matches the first three days, putted lights-out in his match against Baddeley, shooting 5 under par in his 15 holes, the best out of anyone, and won 4 & 3 to clinch the winning point for the Americans.

International	Results	United States	Timetable
Kim	1 up	Simpson	4th: 12–14
Schwartzel	2 & 1	Johnson	3rd: 11–14
Ishikawa	3 & 2	Watson	2nd: 10–14
Ogilvy	2 up	Haas	7th: 13–16
Day	5 & 3	Mahan	1st: 9–14
Choi	3 & 2	Watney	5th: 12–15
Scott	2 & 1	Mickelson	9th: 14–17
Goosen	1 up	Kuchar	11th: 15–18
Els	4 & 3	Furyk	8th: 13–17
Allenby	7 & 5	Toms	6th: 12–16
Baddeley	4 & 3	Woods	10th: 14–18
Yang	2 & 1	Stricker	12th: 15–19
6	Singles	6
15	Overall	19

== Individual player records ==
Each entry refers to the win–loss–half record of the player.

=== International ===
Player	Points	Overall	Singles	Foursomes	Fourballs
Robert Allenby	0	0–4–0	0–1–0	0–2–0	0–1–0
Aaron Baddeley	1.5	1–3–1	0–1–0	0–1–1	1–1–0
K. J. Choi	3	3–2–0	0–1–0	1–1–0	2–0–0
Jason Day	1.5	1–3–1	0–1–0	0–1–1	1–1–0
Ernie Els	1	1–4–0	0–1–0	1–1–0	0–2–0
Retief Goosen	3	3–2–0	1–0–0	0–2–0	2–0–0
Ryo Ishikawa	2	2–2–0	1–0–0	1–1–0	0–1–0
Kim Kyung-tae	2	2–2–0	1–0–0	0–1–0	1–1–0
Geoff Ogilvy	3.5	3–1–1	1–0–0	0–1–1	2–0–0
Charl Schwartzel	3.5	3–1–1	1–0–0	0–1–1	2–0–0
Adam Scott	2	2–3–0	1–0–0	1–1–0	0–2–0
Yang Yong-eun	1	1–3–0	0–1–0	0–1–0	1–1–0

=== United States ===
Player	Points	Overall	Singles	Foursomes	Fourballs
Jim Furyk	5	5–0–0	1–0–0	2–0–0	2–0–0
Bill Haas	1.5	1–3–1	0–1–0	0–1–1	1–1–0
Dustin Johnson	1.5	1–3–1	0–1–0	1–0–1	0–2–0
Matt Kuchar	1.5	1–3–1	0–1–0	0–1–1	1–1–0
Hunter Mahan	4	4–1–0	1–0–0	2–0–0	1–1–0
Phil Mickelson	3	3–1–0	0–1–0	2–0–0	1–0–0
Webb Simpson	3	3–2–0	0–1–0	2–0–0	1–1–0
Steve Stricker	2	2–2–0	1–0–0	0–1–0	1–1–0
David Toms	3	3–1–0	1–0–0	2–0–0	0–1–0
Nick Watney	2.5	2–1–1	1–0–0	0–0–1	1–1–0
Bubba Watson	3	3–2–0	0–1–0	2–0–0	1–1–0
Tiger Woods	2	2–3–0	1–0–0	1–1–0	0–2–0
