= 2009 Presidents Cup =

Golf match in California, US

- Dates: October 8–11, 2009
- Venue: Harding Park Golf Club
- Location: San Francisco, California, U.S.
- Captains: Fred Couples (USA); Greg Norman (International)
USA	19 1/2	14 1/2	International
- United States wins the Presidents Cup

Location map
- Location within the United States Location within California

The 2009 Presidents Cup was held October 8–11, 2009 at the Harding Park Golf Club in San Francisco, California. The United States team won the golf competition by a margin of 19 1/2–14 1/2, their second consecutive win by that exact score and third in a row overall. This was also the sixth outright win for the U.S. Team in eight meetings, with one International win in 1998 and one tied match in 2003.

== Format ==
The first day of competition featured six foursomes matches. On the second day, six matches of four-ball were played. This was followed on Day 3 by five morning foursomes matches and five afternoon four-ball matches. On the fourth and final day, twelve singles matches were played, for a total of 34 matches in the competition.

The final day was conducted under a special rule that differed slightly from that used in other team competitions such as the Ryder Cup. Singles matches ending halved after the regulation 18 holes were to be extended to extra holes until an outright winner was determined. This format was used until one team earned the 17 1/2 points needed to win the Cup outright, at which time all remaining matches were only played to the regulation 18 holes and could be halved.

No matches went to extra holes in the 2009 competition. The first match on the final day in which all 18 holes were played was the Mike Weir–Justin Leonard match, which finished all square after 18. At that time, the U.S. Team was leading 17–10, which meant that the match should have continued. However, at the same time, the Y.E. Yang–Tiger Woods match was at the 13th hole with Woods 5 up. Instead of immediately going to the first hole to continue their match, Weir and Leonard watched the Yang–Woods match on a nearby giant screen. When Woods sank the putt that gave him a 6 and 5 victory and gave the U.S. an insurmountable 18–10 lead, Weir and Leonard, seeing that the outcome of the Cup was no longer in doubt, agreed to halve their match.

== Teams ==
Both teams had 12 players plus a non-playing captain. Members of the U.S. Team were selected based on earnings from the 2007 Wyndham Championship through the 2009 PGA Championship. International Team players were chosen on the basis of the Official World Golf Ranking through the 2009 PGA Championship. The International Team does not include players eligible for the European Ryder Cup Team. The top 10 players from each list made their respective teams and the captains choose the remaining two players.

United States team
Player	Age	Points rank	OWGR	Previous appearances	Matches	W–L–H	Winning percentage
Fred Couples	50	Non-playing captain					
Jay Haas	55	Non-playing assistant captain					
Tiger Woods	33	1	1	5	25	13–11–1	54.00
Phil Mickelson	39	2	2	7	33	11–13–9	46.97
Steve Stricker	42	3	3	2	10	5–5–0	50.00
Kenny Perry	49	4	6	3	13	7–6–0	53.85
Zach Johnson	33	5	18	1	4	2–2–0	50.00
Stewart Cink	36	6	13	3	13	8–4–1	65.38
Sean O'Hair	27	7	14	0	Rookie		
Jim Furyk	39	8	9	5	23	13–8–2	60.87
Anthony Kim	24	9	22	0	Rookie		
Justin Leonard	37	10	38	4	18	6–10–2	38.89
Lucas Glover	29	11	17	1	5	2–3–0	40.00
Hunter Mahan	27	13	25	1	5	2–3–0	40.00

International team
Player	Country	Age	Points rank	OWGR	Previous appearances	Matches	W–L–H	Winning percentage
Greg Norman	Australia	54	Non-playing captain					
Frank Nobilo	New Zealand	49	Non-playing assistant captain					
Geoff Ogilvy	Australia	32	1	10	1	5	2–3–0	40.00
Vijay Singh	Fiji	46	2	15	7	35	14–15–6	48.57
Camilo Villegas	Colombia	27	3	16	0	Rookie		
Retief Goosen	South Africa	40	4	21	4	20	11–7–2	60.00
Ernie Els	South Africa	39	5	23	5	25	13–10–2	56.00
Ángel Cabrera	Argentina	40	6	28	2	9	3–3–3	50.00
Mike Weir	Canada	39	7	31	4	19	11–7–1	60.53
Robert Allenby	Australia	38	8	32	4	19	6–11–2	36.84
Yang Yong-eun	South Korea	37	9	30	0	Rookie		
Tim Clark	South Africa	33	10	37	2	10	4–5–1	45.00
Adam Scott	Australia	29	14	65	3	15	7–6–2	53.33
Ryo Ishikawa	Japan	18	20	43	0	Rookie		

- OWGR as of October 5, 2009, the last ranking before the Cup

== Thursday's matches ==
All matches were foursomes.

International	Results	United States
Clark/Weir	3 & 2	Kim/Mickelson
Els/Scott	2 & 1	Mahan/O'Hair
Allenby/Singh	1 up	Cink/Glover
Cabrera/Villegas	2 up	Johnson/Perry
Ishikawa/Ogilvy	6 & 4	Stricker/Woods
Goosen/Yang	halved	Furyk/Leonard
2 1/2	Foursomes	3 1/2
2 1/2	Overall	3 1/2

== Friday's matches ==
All matches were in four-ball format.

International	Results	United States
Goosen/Scott	3 & 2	Leonard/Mickelson
Els/Weir	2 up	Furyk/Kim
Ishikawa/Yang	4 & 3	O'Hair/Perry
Clark/Singh	1 up	Cink/Glover
Allenby/Villegas	2 & 1	Johnson/Mahan
Cabrera/Ogilvy	5 & 3	Stricker/Woods
3	Four-ball	3
5 1/2	Overall	6 1/2

== Saturday's matches ==
=== Morning foursomes ===
International	Results	United States
Goosen/Villegas	5 & 3	Mickelson/O'Hair
Els/Scott	4 & 2	Furyk/Leonard
Allenby/Singh	halved	Cink/Mahan
Clark/Weir	1 up	Stricker/Woods
Ishikawa/Yang	3 & 2	Johnson/Perry
1 1/2	Foursomes	3 1/2
7	Overall	10

=== Afternoon four-ball ===
International	Results	United States
Cabrera/Scott	2 up	Furyk/Kim
Allenby/Ogilvy	2 & 1	Cink/Glover
Els/Weir	5 & 3	Johnson/Leonard
Ishikawa/Yang	4 & 2	Stricker/Woods
Clark/Singh	halved	Mickelson/O'Hair
2 1/2	Four-ball	2 1/2
9 1/2	Overall	12 1/2

== Sunday's matches ==
All matches featured were in singles competition.

International	Results	United States
Villegas	2 & 1	Mahan
Scott	4 & 3	Cink
Weir	halved	Leonard
Allenby	5 & 3	Kim
Ogilvy	2 & 1	Stricker
Els	6 & 4	O'Hair
Ishikawa	2 & 1	Perry
Clark	4 & 3	Johnson
Yang	6 & 5	Woods
Singh	halved	Glover
Goosen	2 & 1	Mickelson
Cabrera	4 & 3	Furyk
5	Singles	7
14 1/2	Overall	19 1/2

== Individual player records ==
Each entry refers to the win–loss–half record of the player.

=== United States ===
Player	Points	Overall	Singles	Foursomes	Fourballs
Stewart Cink	1.5	1–3–1	1–0–0	0–1–1	0–2–0
Jim Furyk	2.5	2–2–1	0–1–0	1–0–1	1–1–0
Lucas Glover	0.5	0–3–1	0–0–1	0–1–0	0–2–0
Zach Johnson	2	2–3–0	0–1–0	1–1–0	1–1–0
Anthony Kim	3	3–1–0	1–0–0	1–0–0	1–1–0
Justin Leonard	3	2–1–2	0–0–1	1–0–1	1–1–0
Hunter Mahan	2.5	2–1–1	1–0–0	0–1–1	1–0–0
Phil Mickelson	4.5	4–0–1	1–0–0	2–0–0	1–0–1
Sean O'Hair	2.5	2–2–1	1–0–0	1–1–0	0–1–1
Kenny Perry	1	1–3–0	0–1–0	1–1–0	0–1–0
Steve Stricker	4	4–1–0	0–1–0	2–0–0	2–0–0
Tiger Woods	5	5–0–0	1–0–0	2–0–0	2–0–0

=== International ===
Player	Points	Overall	Singles	Foursomes	Fourballs
Robert Allenby	2.5	2–2–1	0–1–0	1–0–1	1–1–0
Ángel Cabrera	1	1–3–0	1–0–0	0–1–0	0–2–0
Tim Clark	2.5	2–2–1	1–0–0	0–2–0	1–0–1
Ernie Els	3	3–2–0	0–1–0	1–1–0	2–0–0
Retief Goosen	0.5	0–3–1	0–1–0	0–1–1	0–1–0
Ryo Ishikawa	3	3–2–0	1–0–0	1–1–0	1–1–0
Geoff Ogilvy	2	2–2–0	1–0–0	0–1–0	1–1–0
Adam Scott	1	1–4–0	0–1–0	1–1–0	0–2–0
Vijay Singh	3.5	2–0–3	0–0–1	1–0–1	1–0–1
Camilo Villegas	0	0–4–0	0–1–0	0–2–0	0–1–0
Mike Weir	2.5	2–2–1	0–0–1	0–2–0	2–0–0
Yang Yong-eun	2.5	2–2–1	0–1–0	1–0–1	1–1–0
