= 1996 Presidents Cup =

Golf match in Virginia, US

- Dates: September 13–15, 1996
- Venue: Robert Trent Jones Golf Club
- Location: Gainesville, Virginia, U.S.
- Captains: Arnold Palmer (USA); Peter Thomson (International)
USA	16 1/2	15 1/2	International
- United States wins the Presidents Cup

Location map
- Location within the United States Location within Virginia

The 2nd Presidents Cup was held between September 13 and 15, 1996. It was played at the Robert Trent Jones Golf Club in Gainesville, Virginia, USA. The United States team won the competition by a margin of 16 1/2–15 1/2, the narrowest margin of victory (later tied by the 2015 Presidents Cup's 15 1/2–14 1/2) in Presidents Cup history, aside from the tie in 2003. The honorary chairman was former President of the United States George H. W. Bush.

== Format ==
Both teams had 12 players plus a non-playing captain. On the first and second day four-ball was played in the morning and foursomes were played in the afternoon. On the third day only singles were played.

== Teams ==
United States team
Player	Age	Points rank	OWGR	Previous appearances	Matches	W–L–H	Winning percentage
Arnold Palmer	67	Non-playing captain					
Phil Mickelson	26	1	9	1	5	2–1–2	60.00
Mark O'Meara	39	2	10	0	Rookie		
Tom Lehman	37	3	5	1	5	2–2–1	50.00
Mark Brooks	35	4	23	0	Rookie		
Davis Love III	32	5	13	1	5	4–0–1	90.00
Corey Pavin	36	6	8	1	5	2–2–1	50.00
Scott Hoch	40	7	20	1	4	2–1–1	62.50
Steve Stricker	29	8	19	0	Rookie		
Fred Couples	36	9	7	1	3	3–0–0	100.00
Justin Leonard	24	10	28	0	Rookie		
David Duval	24	11	17	0	Rookie		
Kenny Perry	36	12	26	0	Rookie		

International team
Player	Country	Age	Points rank	OWGR	Previous appearances	Matches	W–L–H	Winning percentage
Peter Thomson	Australia	67	Non-playing captain					
Ian Baker-Finch	Australia	35	Non-playing assistant captain					
Greg Norman	Australia	41	1	1	0	Rookie		
Ernie Els	South Africa	26	2	3	0	Rookie		
Masashi "Jumbo" Ozaki	Japan	49	3	6	0	Rookie		
Nick Price	Zimbabwe	39	4	11	1	4	0–2–2	25.00
Steve Elkington	Australia	33	5	12	1	5	2–2–1	50.00
Vijay Singh	Fiji	33	6	18	1	5	3–1–1	70.00
Frank Nobilo	New Zealand	36	7	29	1	5	1–3–1	30.00
Mark McNulty	Zimbabwe	42	8	34	1	4	1–2–1	37.50
Craig Parry	Australia	30	9	32	1	5	2–3–0	40.00
David Frost	South Africa	37	10	41	1	4	1–2–1	37.50
Robert Allenby	Australia	25	11	37	1	5	1–4–0	20.00
Peter Senior	Australia	37	13	61	1	3	2–1–0	66.67

- OWGR as of September 8, 1996, the last ranking before the Cup

== Friday's matches ==
=== Morning four-ball ===
International	Results	United States
Norman/Allenby	2 & 1	Couples/Love
Els/McNulty	2 up	Hoch/Brooks
Singh/Ozaki	2 & 1	Mickelson/Pavin
Elkington/Nobilo	3 & 2	O'Meara/Duval
Price/Senior	4 & 2	Lehman/Stricker
1	Four-Ball	4
1	Overall	4

=== Afternoon foursomes ===
International	Results	United States
Price/Frost	3 & 2	Perry/Leonard
Nobilo/Parry	2 & 1	O'Meara/Duval
Elkington/Singh	2 up	Lehman/Stricker
Els/McNulty	halved	Mickelson/Pavin
Norman/Allenby	1 up	Couples/Love
1 1/2	Foursomes	3 1/2
2 1/2	Overall	7 1/2

== Saturday's matches ==
=== Morning four-ball ===
International	Results	United States
Price/Elkington	2 up	Leonard/Lehman
Norman/Allenby	1 up	Stricker/Pavin
Parry/Nobilo	2 & 1	Perry/Hoch
Ozaki/Singh	2 & 1	Love/Couples
Els/McNulty	4 & 3	O'Meara/Duval
3	Four-Ball	2
5 1/2	Overall	9 1/2

=== Afternoon foursomes ===
International	Results	United States
Senior/Frost	3 & 2	Pavin/Mickelson
Nobilo/Allenby	3 & 2	Love/Brooks
Price/McNulty	3 & 1	Perry/Leonard
Norman/Els	1 up	Lehman/Stricker
Elkington/Singh	1 up	O'Meara/Hoch
4	Foursomes	1
9 1/2	Overall	10 1/2

== Sunday's matches ==
=== Singles ===
International	Results	United States
Parry	5 & 4	Brooks
Senior	3 & 2	Duval
Price	1 up	O'Meara
Frost	7 & 6	Perry
Allenby	6 & 5	Stricker
McNulty	1 up	Hoch
Ozaki	5 & 4	Love
Elkington	1 up	Leonard
Els	3 & 2	Mickelson
Norman	3 & 1	Pavin
Nobilo	3 & 2	Lehman
Singh	2 & 1	Couples
6	Singles	6
15 1/2	Overall	16 1/2

== Individual player records ==
Each entry refers to the win–loss–half record of the player.

=== United States ===
Player	Points	Overall	Singles	Foursomes	Fourballs
Mark Brooks	0	0–3–0	0–1–0	0–1–0	0–1–0
Fred Couples	3	3–1–0	1–0–0	1–0–0	1–1–0
David Duval	4	4–0–0	1–0–0	1–0–0	2–0–0
Scott Hoch	3	3–1–0	1–0–0	1–0–0	1–1–0
Tom Lehman	1	1–4–0	0–1–0	0–2–0	1–1–0
Justin Leonard	1	1–3–0	0–1–0	1–1–0	0–1–0
Davis Love III	3	3–2–0	1–0–0	1–1–0	1–1–0
Phil Mickelson	1.5	1–2–1	0–1–0	0–1–1	1–0–0
Mark O'Meara	5	5–0–0	1–0–0	2–0–0	2–0–0
Corey Pavin	1.5	1–3–1	0–1–0	0–1–1	1–1–0
Kenny Perry	2	2–2–0	0–1–0	1–1–0	1–0–0
Steve Stricker	2	2–3–0	1–0–0	0–2–0	1–1–0

=== International ===
Player	Points	Overall	Singles	Foursomes	Fourballs
Robert Allenby	2	2–3–0	0–1–0	1–1–0	1–1–0
Steve Elkington	3	3–2–0	1–0–0	1–1–0	1–1–0
Ernie Els	3.5	3–1–1	1–0–0	1–0–1	1–1–0
David Frost	2	2–1–0	1–0–0	1–1–0	0–0–0
Mark McNulty	2.5	2–2–1	0–1–0	1–0–1	1–1–0
Frank Nobilo	2	2–3–0	1–0–0	1–1–0	0–2–0
Greg Norman	3	3–2–0	1–0–0	1–1–0	1–1–0
Masashi Ozaki	1	1–2–0	0–1–0	0–0–0	1–1–0
Craig Parry	1	1–2–0	1–0–0	0–1–0	0–1–0
Nick Price	2	2–3–0	0–1–0	1–1–0	1–1–0
Peter Senior	1	1–2–0	0–1–0	1–0–0	0–1–0
Vijay Singh	2	2–3–0	0–1–0	1–1–0	1–1–0
