= 2024 Presidents Cup =

Golf competition in Montreal, Quebec, Canada

- Dates: September 26–29
- Venue: Royal Montreal Golf Club
- Location: Montreal, Quebec, Canada
- Captains: Mike Weir (International); Jim Furyk (USA)
International	11 1/2	18 1/2	USA
- United States wins the Presidents Cup

Location map
- Location within Canada Location within Quebec Location within Greater Montreal

The 2024 Presidents Cup was the 15th edition of the Presidents Cup golf competition, held September 26 to 29 at Royal Montreal Golf Club in Montreal, Quebec, Canada. Royal Montreal previously hosted in 2007

Team USA won the cup for their tenth consecutive victory in the series.

== Course layout ==
Royal Montreal Golf Club

Hole	1	2	3	4	5	6	7	8	9	Out	10	11	12	13	14	15	16	17	18	In	Total
Yards	440	427	489	509	231	577	160	427	448	3,708	462	489	574	229	403	448	472	160	468	3,705	7,413
Par	4	4	4	4	3	5	3	4	4	35	4	4	5	3	4	4	4	3	4	35	70

== Team qualification and selection ==
Both teams have 12 players.

Key
Top six on points list
Six captain's picks
Not available / not picked in top 15 of points list

=== International team ===
The team is composed of the top six players from the Presidents Cup International Team Points List, which is based on the Official World Golf Ranking, and six captain's picks.

The final standings were:

Position	Player	Points
1	Hideki Matsuyama	5.49
2	Im Sung-jae	3.36
3	Adam Scott	3.36
4	Tom Kim	3.31
5	Jason Day	2.97
6	An Byeong-hun	2.83
7	Corey Conners	2.60
8	Cameron Davis	2.54
9	Min Woo Lee	2.48
10	Christiaan Bezuidenhout	2.36
11	Taylor Pendrith	2.29
12	Nick Taylor	2.25
13	Adam Hadwin	2.25
14	Kim Si-woo	2.25
15	Mackenzie Hughes	1.86

=== United States team ===
The United States team features the six players who have earned the most FedEx Cup points from the events in 2023 through the 2024 BMW Championship. Six captain's picks were made on 3 September 2024.

The final standings are:

Position	Player	Points
1	Scottie Scheffler	13,711
2	Xander Schauffele	9,674
3	Collin Morikawa	6,084
4	Wyndham Clark	5,750
5	Patrick Cantlay	4,866
6	Sahith Theegala	4,566
7	Sam Burns	4,269
8	Tony Finau	4,214
9	Russell Henley	4,030
10	Keegan Bradley	4,002
11	Brian Harman	3,887
12	Max Homa	3,857
13	Chris Kirk	3,635
14	Akshay Bhatia	3,619
15	Eric Cole	3,263

== Teams ==
=== Captains ===
Mike Weir is captain of the International team while Jim Furyk is captain of the United States team. International team captain's assistants are: Ernie Els, Trevor Immelman, Geoff Ogilvy and Camilo Villegas. USA team captain's assistants are: Stewart Cink, Justin Leonard, Kevin Kisner and Brandt Snedeker.

=== Players ===
International team
Player	Country	Age	Points rank	OWGR	Previous appearances	Matches	W–L–T	Winning percentage
Hideki Matsuyama	Japan	32	1	7	5	22	7–10–5	43.18
Im Sung-jae	South Korea	26	2	21	2	10	5–3–2	60.00
Adam Scott	Australia	44	3	18	10	49	18–25–6	42.86
Tom Kim	South Korea	22	4	24	1	5	2–3–0	40.00
Jason Day	Australia	36	5	33	4	20	5–11–4	35.00
An Byeong-hun	South Korea	33	6	34	1	5	1–2–2	40.00
Corey Conners	Canada	32	7	37	1	4	0–4–0	0.00
Min Woo Lee	Australia	26	9	40	0	Rookie		
Christiaan Bezuidenhout	South Africa	30	10	45	1	2	1–0–1	75.00
Taylor Pendrith	Canada	33	11	44	1	4	0–4–0	0.00
Kim Si-woo	South Korea	29	14	49	2	7	4–3–0	57.14
Mackenzie Hughes	Canada	33	15	61	0	Rookie		

United States team
Player	Age	Points rank	OWGR	Previous appearances	Matches	W–L–T	Winning percentage
Scottie Scheffler	28	1	1	1	4	0–3–1	12.50
Xander Schauffele	30	2	2	2	9	6–3–0	66.67
Collin Morikawa	27	3	4	1	3	2–1–0	66.67
Wyndham Clark	30	4	6	0	Rookie		
Patrick Cantlay	32	5	9	2	9	6–3–0	66.67
Sahith Theegala	26	6	11	0	Rookie		
Sam Burns	28	7	19	1	5	0–3–2	20.00
Tony Finau	35	8	23	2	8	3–2–3	56.25
Russell Henley	35	9	14	0	Rookie		
Keegan Bradley	38	10	13	1	5	2–2–1	50.00
Brian Harman	37	11	22	0	Rookie		
Max Homa	33	12	25	1	4	4–0–0	100.00

== Thursday's fourball matches ==
International	Results	United States
Day/An	1 up	Schauffele/Finau
Scott/Lee	1 up	Morikawa/Theegala
Im/T. Kim	3 & 2	Scheffler/Henley
Pendrith/Bezuidenhout	1 up	Clark/Bradley
Matsuyama/Conners	2 & 1	Cantlay/Burns
0	Fourball	5
0	Overall	5

== Friday's foursomes matches ==
International	Results	United States
Matsuyama/Im	7 & 6	Cantlay/Schauffele
Scott/Pendrith	5 & 4	Theegala/Morikawa
Bezuidenhout/Day	1 up	Homa/Harman
Conners/Hughes	6 & 5	Clark/Finau
S. W. Kim/An	1 up	Scheffler/Henley
5	Foursomes	0
5	Overall	5

== Saturday's matches ==
=== Morning fourball ===
International	Results	United States
Scott/Pendrith	2 & 1	Scheffler/Morikawa
Conners/Hughes	3 & 2	Finau/Schauffele
S. W. Kim/T. Kim	4 & 3	Bradley/Clark
Matsuyama/Im	2 & 1	Cantlay/Burns
1	Fourball	3
6	Overall	8

=== Afternoon foursomes ===
International	Results	United States
Matsuyama/Im	3 & 2	Scheffler/Henley
Pendrith/Scott	2 up	Harman/Homa
Conners/Hughes	1 up	Morikawa/Burns
S. W. Kim/T. Kim	1 up	Cantlay/Schauffele
1	Foursomes	3
7	Overall	11

== Sunday's singles matches ==
International	Results	United States	Timetable
Day	4 & 3	Schauffele	1st: 7–12
T. Kim	Tied	Burns	2nd: 7.5–12.5
Matsuyama	1 up	Scheffler	4th: 8.5–13.5
Im	3 & 2	Henley	3rd: 7.5–13.5
Pendrith	3 & 1	Cantlay	6th: 9.5–14.5
S. W. Kim	1 up	Bradley	7th: 9.5–15.5
Conners	5 & 3	Finau	5th: 9.5–13.5
Lee	Tied	Clark	8th: 10.0–16.0
An	Tied	Theegala	9th: 10.5–16.5
Scott	2 & 1	Morikawa	10th: 10.5–17.5
Bezuidenhout	2 & 1	Harman	11th: 11.5–17.5
Hughes	2 & 1	Homa	12th: 11.5–18.5
4.5	Singles	7.5
11.5	Overall	18.5

== Individual player records ==
Each entry refers to the Win–Loss–Tie record of the player.

=== International ===
Player	Points	Overall	Singles	Foursomes	Fourballs
An Byeong-hun	1.5	1–1–1	0–0–1	1–0–0	0–1–0
Christiaan Bezuidenhout	2	2–1–0	1–0–0	1–0–0	0–1–0
Corey Conners	2	2–3–0	1–0–0	1–1–0	0–2–0
Jason Day	1	1–2–0	0–1–0	1–0–0	0–1–0
Mackenzie Hughes	1	1–3–0	0–1–0	1–1–0	0–1–0
Im Sung-jae	1	1–4–0	0–1–0	1–1–0	0–2–0
Kim Si-woo	2	2–2–0	0–1–0	1–1–0	1–0–0
Tom Kim	1.5	1–2–1	0–0–1	0–1–0	1–1–0
Min Woo Lee	0.5	0–1–1	0–0–1	0–0–0	0–1–0
Hideki Matsuyama	2	2–3–0	1–0–0	1–1–0	0–2–0
Taylor Pendrith	2	2–3–0	0–1–0	2–0–0	0–2–0
Adam Scott	2	2–3–0	0–1–0	2–0–0	0–2–0

=== United States ===
Player	Points	Overall	Singles	Foursomes	Fourballs
Keegan Bradley	2	2–1–0	1–0–0	0–0–0	1–1–0
Sam Burns	3.5	3–0–1	0–0–1	1–0–0	2–0–0
Patrick Cantlay	4	4–1–0	1–0–0	1–1–0	2–0–0
Wyndham Clark	1.5	1–2–1	0–0–1	0–1–0	1–1–0
Tony Finau	2	2–2–0	0–1–0	0–1–0	2–0–0
Brian Harman	0	0–3–0	0–1–0	0–2–0	0–0–0
Russell Henley	3	3–1–0	1–0–0	1–1–0	1–0–0
Max Homa	1	1–2–0	1–0–0	0–2–0	0–0–0
Collin Morikawa	4	4–1–0	1–0–0	1–1–0	2–0–0
Xander Schauffele	4	4–1–0	1–0–0	1–1–0	2–0–0
Scottie Scheffler	3	3–2–0	0–1–0	1–1–0	2–0–0
Sahith Theegala	1.5	1–1–1	0–0–1	0–1–0	1–0–0
