= 2007 Presidents Cup =

Golf match in Canada

- Dates: September 27–30, 2007
- Venue: Royal Montreal Golf Club
- Location: Île Bizard, Quebec, Canada
- Captains: Gary Player (International); Jack Nicklaus (USA)
International	14 1/2	19 1/2	USA
- United States wins the Presidents Cup

Location map
- Location within Canada Location within Quebec Location within Greater Montreal

The 2007 Presidents Cup was held in 2007 between September 27 and 30. It was played at the Royal Montreal Golf Club in Île Bizard, Quebec, Canada. The United States team won the competition by a margin of 19 1/2–14 1/2.

== Format ==
On the first day six matches of foursomes were played. On the second day six matches of four-ball were played. On the third day five matches of foursomes were played in the morning and five matches of four-ball were played in the afternoon. On the fourth and final day, twelve singles matches were played. 34 matches were played in all.

== Teams ==
Both teams have 12 players plus a non-playing captain. Members of the U.S. Team were selected based on earnings from the 2005 World Golf Championships - NEC Invitational through the 2007 PGA Championship. International Team players were chosen on the basis of the Official World Golf Ranking through the 2007 PGA Championship. The International Team does not include players eligible for the European Ryder Cup Team.

International team
Player	Country	Age	Points rank	OWGR	Previous appearances	Matches	W–L–H	Winning percentage
Gary Player	South Africa	71	Non-playing captain					
Ian Baker-Finch	Australia	46	Non-playing assistant captain					
Ernie Els	South Africa	37	1	5	4	20	10–8–2	55.00
Adam Scott	Australia	27	2	6	2	10	6–3–1	65.00
Vijay Singh	Fiji	44	3	12	6	30	12–13–5	48.33
Geoff Ogilvy	Australia	30	4	11	0	Rookie		
K. J. Choi	South Korea	37	5	10	1	5	2–3–0	40.00
Rory Sabbatini	South Africa	31	6	8	0	Rookie		
Retief Goosen	South Africa	38	7	17	3	15	9–5–1	63.33
Trevor Immelman	South Africa	27	8	18	1	4	1–3–0	25.00
Ángel Cabrera	Argentina	38	9	19	1	5	1–1–3	50.00
Stuart Appleby	Australia	36	10	34	4	16	3–11–2	25.00
Nick O'Hern	Australia	35	11	36	1	5	2–3–0	40.00
Mike Weir	Canada	37	20	46	3	14	8–6–0	57.14

United States team
Player	Age	Points rank	OWGR	Previous appearances	Matches	W–L–H	Winning percentage
Jack Nicklaus	67	Non-playing captain					
Jeff Sluman	50	Non-playing assistant captain					
Tiger Woods	31	1	1	4	20	10–9–1	52.50
Jim Furyk	37	2	3	4	18	10–6–2	61.11
Phil Mickelson	37	3	2	6	28	9–12–7	44.64
Zach Johnson	31	4	14	0	Rookie		
Charles Howell III	28	5	33	1	5	3–2–0	60.00
Scott Verplank	43	6	24	1	5	2–2–1	50.00
David Toms	40	7	26	2	9	2–7–0	22.22
Steve Stricker	40	8	4	1	5	2–3–0	40.00
Stewart Cink	34	9	23	2	9	5–3–1	61.11
Woody Austin	43	10	31	0	Rookie		
Lucas Glover	27	11	61	0	Rookie		
Hunter Mahan	25	14	41	0	Rookie		

- OWGR as of September 23, 2007, the last ranking before the Cup

== Thursday's matches ==
All matches were foursomes.

International	Results	United States
Scott/Ogilvy	3 & 2	Mahan/Stricker
Singh/Weir	halved	Mickelson/Austin
Sabbatini/Immelman	1 up	Cink/Johnson
Els/Cabrera	1 up	Toms/Furyk
Appleby/Goosen	2 up	Glover/Verplank
Choi/O'Hern	3 & 1	Woods/Howell
1/2	Foursomes	5 1/2
1/2	Overall	5 1/2

== Friday's matches ==
All matches were in four-ball format.

International	Results	United States
Cabrera/Goosen	1 up	Mickelson/Mahan
Singh/Appleby	5 & 4	Woods/Furyk
Els/Weir	3 & 1	Johnson /Howell
Scott/Choi	2 & 1	Stricker/Verplank
Ogilvy/O'Hern	1 up	Cink/Glover
Immelman/Sabbatini	halved	Austin/Toms
4 1/2	Four-ball	1 1/2
5	Overall	7

== Saturday's matches ==
=== Morning foursomes ===
International	Results	United States
Immelman/Sabbatini	2 up	Stricker/Mahan
Goosen/Appleby	5 & 4	Mickelson/Austin
Scott/Els	4 & 3	Woods/Furyk
Singh/Weir	2 & 1	Glover/Verplank
O'Hern/Ogilvy	2 & 1	Johnson/Toms
0	Foursomes	5
5	Overall	12

=== Afternoon four-ball ===
International	Results	United States
Cabrera/Choi	1 up	Cink/Furyk
Scott/Goosen	halved	Mickelson/Austin
Weir/Els	4 & 2	Howell/Glover
Singh/Appleby	1 up	Stricker/Mahan
O'Hern/Ogilvy	5 & 3	Woods/Toms
2 1/2	Four-ball	2 1/2
7 1/2	Overall	14 1/2

== Sunday's matches ==
All matches featured are in singles competition.

International	Results	United States
Sabbatini	2 & 1	Verplank
Els	2 up	Glover
Singh	5 & 4	Mickelson
Weir	1 up	Woods
Cabrera	2 & 1	Austin
Scott	2 & 1	Johnson
Immelman	2 up	Toms
O'Hern	6 & 4	Cink
Ogilvy	1 up	Stricker
Choi	3 & 2	Mahan
Appleby	2 & 1	Howell
Goosen	2 & 1	Furyk
7	Singles	5
14 1/2	Overall	19 1/2

== Individual player records ==
Each entry refers to the win–loss–half record of the player.

=== International ===
Player	Points	Overall	Singles	Foursomes	Fourballs
Stuart Appleby	2	2–3–0	0–1–0	0–2–0	2–0–0
Ángel Cabrera	2	2–2–0	1–0–0	0–1–0	1–1–0
K. J. Choi	1	1–3–0	1–0–0	0–1–0	0–2–0
Ernie Els	3	3–2–0	1–0–0	0–2–0	2–0–0
Retief Goosen	2.5	2–2–1	1–0–0	0–2–0	1–0–1
Trevor Immelman	0.5	0–3–1	0–1–0	0–2–0	0–0–1
Geoff Ogilvy	2	2–3–0	1–0–0	0–2–0	1–1–0
Nick O'Hern	1	1–4–0	0–1–0	0–2–0	1–1–0
Rory Sabbatini	0.5	0–3–1	0–1–0	0–2–0	0–0–1
Adam Scott	1.5	1–3–1	1–0–0	0–2–0	0–1–1
Vijay Singh	2.5	2–2–1	0–1–0	0–1–1	2–0–0
Mike Weir	3.5	3–1–1	1–0–0	0–1–1	2–0–0

=== United States ===
Player	Points	Overall	Singles	Foursomes	Fourballs
Woody Austin	2.5	1–1–3	0–1–0	1–0–1	0–0–2
Stewart Cink	3	3–1–0	1–0–0	1–0–0	1–1–0
Jim Furyk	3	3–2–0	0–1–0	2–0–0	1–1–0
Lucas Glover	2	2–3–0	0–1–0	2–0–0	0–2–0
Charles Howell III	2	2–2–0	1–0–0	1–0–0	0–2–0
Zach Johnson	2	2–2–0	0–1–0	2–0–0	0–1–0
Hunter Mahan	2	2–3–0	0–1–0	2–0–0	0–2–0
Phil Mickelson	3	2–1–2	1–0–0	1–0–1	0–1–1
Steve Stricker	3	3–2–0	0–1–0	2–0–0	1–1–0
David Toms	4.5	4–0–1	1–0–0	2–0–0	1–0–1
Scott Verplank	4	4–0–0	1–0–0	2–0–0	1–0–0
Tiger Woods	3	3–2–0	0–1–0	2–0–0	1–1–0
