= 2013 Presidents Cup =

Golf match in the US

- Dates: October 3–6, 2013
- Venue: Muirfield Village Golf Club
- Location: Dublin, Ohio, U.S.
- Captains: Fred Couples (USA); Nick Price (International)
USA	18 1/2	15 1/2	International
- United States wins the Presidents Cup

Location map
- Location within the United States Location within Ohio

The 2013 Presidents Cup was held October 3–6 at Muirfield Village Golf Club in Dublin, Ohio, a suburb north of Columbus. It was the tenth Presidents Cup competition and the sixth played in the United States.

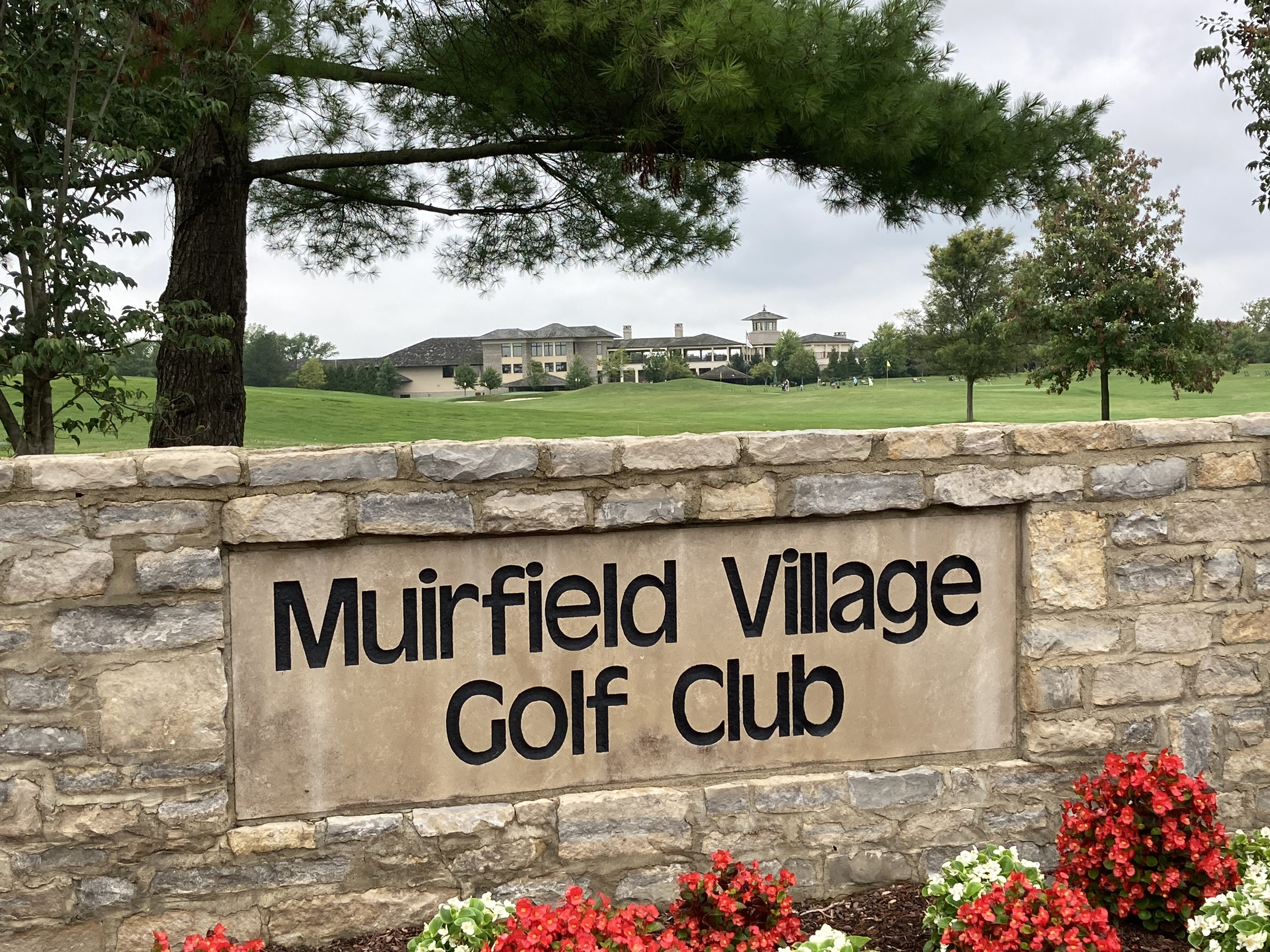
Muirfield Village Golf Club

The selection of Muirfield as the 2013 tournament site was taken as a tribute to golfing great Jack Nicklaus, who designed the course. Nicklaus has said that his involvement as tournament host for the 2013 Presidents Cup "probably will be my last involvement in anything significant in the game of golf". Muirfield was the third U.S. course to host the tournament, and the first course in the world to host Presidents Cup, Ryder Cup, and Solheim Cup international team competitions.

In May 2012, Fred Couples and Nick Price were named captains of the U.S. and International teams, respectively.

The United States won for the fifth successive time with an 18 1/2–15 1/2 victory over the International team.

== Format ==
The first day consists of six matches of fourball. The second day consists of six matches of foursomes. The third day consists of five matches of fourball in the morning and five matches of foursomes in the afternoon. On the fourth and final day, twelve singles matches were played. 34 matches were played in all. All fourball and foursomes matches that are all-square after 18 holes will score 1/2 point for each team. All singles matches that are all-square after 18 holes will continue until a winner is determined. The fourball matches being played first is a change from the previous seven Cups.

== Team qualification and selection ==
Both teams had 12 players.

Key
Top ten on points list
Two captain's picks
Not picked, in top 15 of points list

=== United States team ===
The United States team featured the top 10 in earnings from September 19, 2011 through September 2, 2013 (the Deutsche Bank Championship), with 2013 earnings weighted double, and two captain's picks. The captain's picks were announced on September 4, 2013.

The final standings were:

Position	Player	Points
1	Tiger Woods	22,627
2	Brandt Snedeker	15,040
3	Phil Mickelson	14,938
4	Matt Kuchar	14,928
5	Jason Dufner	10,832
6	Keegan Bradley	10,731
7	Steve Stricker	10,431
8	Bill Haas	10,354
9	Hunter Mahan	10,022
10	Zach Johnson	9,185
11	Webb Simpson	9,174
12	Dustin Johnson	8,788
13	Jim Furyk	8,686
14	Bubba Watson	8,170
15	Billy Horschel	6,988
22	Jordan Spieth	

=== International team ===
The International team featured the top 10 in the Official World Golf Ranking as of September 2, 2013 and two captain's picks. The captain's picks were announced on September 4, 2013.

The final standings were:

Position	Player	Average
1	Adam Scott	9.48
2	Jason Day	4.64
3	Charl Schwartzel	4.45
4	Ernie Els	4.41
5	Louis Oosthuizen	4.18
6	Hideki Matsuyama	3.67
7	Branden Grace	3.01
8	Graham DeLaet	2.99
9	Richard Sterne	2.91
10	Ángel Cabrera	2.41
11	Thongchai Jaidee	2.26
12	Marc Leishman	2.18
13	Tim Clark	2.17
14	Brendon de Jonge	2.01
15	George Coetzee	1.90

== Players ==
United States team
Player	Age	Points rank	OWGR	Previous appearances	Matches	W–L–H	Winning percentage
Fred Couples	54	Non-playing captain					
Jay Haas	59	Non-playing assistant captain					
Davis Love III	49	Non-playing assistant captain					
Tiger Woods	37	1	1	7	35	20–14–1	58.57
Brandt Snedeker	32	2	9	0	Rookie		
Phil Mickelson	43	3	3	9	42	18–14–10	54.76
Matt Kuchar	35	4	8	1	5	1–3–1	30.00
Jason Dufner	36	5	10	0	Rookie		
Keegan Bradley	27	6	15	0	Rookie		
Steve Stricker	46	7	7	4	19	11–8–0	57.89
Bill Haas	31	8	28	1	5	1–3–1	30.00
Hunter Mahan	31	9	26	3	14	8–5–1	60.71
Zach Johnson	37	10	11	2	9	4–5–0	44.44
Webb Simpson	28	11	24	1	5	3–2–0	60.00
Jordan Spieth	20	22	21	0	Rookie		

International team
Player	Country	Age	Points rank	OWGR	Previous appearances	Matches	W–L–H	Winning percentage
Nick Price	Zimbabwe	56	Non-playing captain					
Shigeki Maruyama	Japan	44	Non-playing assistant captain					
Mark McNulty	Zimbabwe	59	Non-playing assistant captain					
Tony Johnstone	Zimbabwe	57	Non-playing assistant captain					
Adam Scott	Australia	33	1	2	5	25	10–13–2	44.00
Jason Day	Australia	25	2	16	1	5	1–3–1	30.00
Charl Schwartzel	South Africa	29	3	19	1	5	3–1–1	70.00
Ernie Els	South Africa	43	4	23	7	35	17–16–2	51.43
Louis Oosthuizen	South Africa	30	5	29	0	Rookie		
Hideki Matsuyama	Japan	21	6	30	0	Rookie		
Branden Grace	South Africa	25	7	38	0	Rookie		
Graham DeLaet	Canada	31	8	32	0	Rookie		
Richard Sterne	South Africa	32	9	41	0	Rookie		
Ángel Cabrera	Argentina	44	10	51	3	13	4–6–3	42.31
Marc Leishman	Australia	29	12	61	0	Rookie		
Brendon de Jonge	Zimbabwe	33	14	63	0	Rookie		

- OWGR as of September 29, 2013, the last ranking before the Cup.
- Age as of the start of the Cup on October 3, 2013.

== Thursday's fourball matches ==
The American team took a one-point lead after the first day of play, winning the final three matches and halving another. Play was delayed for 90 minutes due to rain but all matches were completed.

International	Results	United States
Day/DeLaet	1 up	Mahan/Snedeker
Scott/Matsuyama	halved	Haas/Simpson
Oosthuizen/Schwartzel	2 & 1	Mickelson/Bradley
Els/de Jonge	1 up	Stricker/Spieth
Cabrera/Leishman	5 & 4	Kuchar/Woods
Grace/Sterne	5 & 3	Dufner/Johnson
2 1/2	Fourball	3 1/2
2 1/2	Overall	3 1/2

== Friday's foursomes matches ==
A nearly three-hour delay due to severe weather meant that only two of the six matches were completed on Friday. Phil Mickelson and Keegan Bradley defeated Jason Day and Graham DeLaet, 4 and 3, while Brendon de Jonge and Ernie Els defeated Hunter Mahan and Bill Hass, 4 and 3. The Americans led 4 1/2 to 3 1/2 at the close of play Friday. Matches resumed early Saturday morning with both sides winning two matches to tie the session at 3–3.

International	Results	United States
Day/DeLaet	4 & 3	Mickelson/Bradley
Els/de Jonge	4 & 3	Haas/Mahan
Grace/Sterne	2 & 1	Stricker/Spieth
Cabrera/Leishman	2 & 1	Simpson/Snedeker
Oosthuizen/Schwartzel	4 & 2	Kuchar/Woods
Scott/Matsuyama	2 & 1	Dufner/Johnson
3	Foursomes	3
5 1/2	Overall	6 1/2

== Saturday's matches ==
=== Morning fourball ===
Rain interrupted play for the third straight day. The U.S. team won four of the five matches to open a four-point lead. The matches did not end until late afternoon.

International	Results	United States
Els/de Jonge	2 & 1	Bradley/Mickelson
Day/DeLaet	2 up	Stricker/Spieth
Cabrera/Grace	4 & 3	Haas/Simpson
Oosthuizen/Schwartzel	2 up	Snedeker/Mahan
Scott/Matsuyama	1 up	Woods/Kuchar
1	Fourball	4
6 1/2	Overall	10 1/2

=== Afternoon foursomes ===
Due to the mornings rain delay, the afternoon foursomes were not completed Saturday. Jason Dufner and Zach Johnson defeated Richard Sterne and Marc Leishman, 4 and 3, in the only match completed Saturday. The other four matches were complete through 9 to 13 holes when play was suspended.

The table below reflects the official order. Match 19 (Sterne/Leishman vs Dufner/Johnson) began first, followed by Match 18 (Mickelson/Bradley vs Day/DeLaet), Match 22 (Simpson/Snedeker vs Oosthuizen/Schwartzel), Match 20 (Haas/Stricker vs Scott/Matsuyama), and Match 21 (Woods/Kuchar vs Els/de Jonge).

International	Results	United States
Day/DeLaet	halved	Mickelson/Bradley
Sterne/Leishman	4 & 3	Dufner/Johnson
Scott/Matsuyama	4 & 3	Haas/Stricker
Els/de Jonge	1 up	Woods/Kuchar
Oosthuizen/Schwartzel	1 up	Simpson/Snedeker
1 1/2	Foursomes	3 1/2
8	Overall	14

== Sunday's singles matches ==
The matches are listed in their official order but the first five matches were actually played in this order: Matsuyama/Mahan, Day/Snedeker, DeLaet/Spieth, Els/Stricker, de Jonge/Dufner.

International	Results	United States	Timetable
Els	1 up	Stricker	7th: 12–17
Matsuyama	3 & 2	Mahan	2nd: 9–15
de Jonge	4 & 3	Dufner	3rd: 9–16
Day	6 & 4	Snedeker	1st: 9–14
DeLaet	1 up	Spieth	4th: 10–16
Scott	2 & 1	Haas	6th: 11–17
Grace	4 & 2	Johnson	5th: 10–17
Leishman	1 up	Kuchar	8th: 13–17
Sterne	1 up	Woods	10th: 14–18
Schwartzel	2 & 1	Bradley	9th: 14–17
Oosthuizen	halved	Simpson	11th: 14 1/2–18 1/2
Cabrera	1 up	Mickelson	12th: 15 1/2–18 1/2
7 1/2	Singles	4 1/2
15 1/2	Overall	18 1/2

== Individual player records ==
Each entry refers to the win–loss–half record of the player.

=== United States ===
Player	Points	Overall	Singles	Foursomes	Fourballs
Keegan Bradley	2.5	2–2–1	0–1–0	1–0–1	1–1–0
Jason Dufner	3	3–1–0	1–0–0	1–1–0	1–0–0
Bill Haas	2.5	2–2–1	0–1–0	1–1–0	1–0–1
Zach Johnson	3	3–1–0	1–0–0	1–1–0	1–0–0
Matt Kuchar	3	3–2–0	0–1–0	1–1–0	2–0–0
Hunter Mahan	2	2–2–0	1–0–0	0–1–0	1–1–0
Phil Mickelson	2.5	2–2–1	0–1–0	1–0–1	1–1–0
Webb Simpson	3	2–1–2	0–0–1	1–1–0	1–0–1
Brandt Snedeker	2	2–3–0	0–1–0	1–1–0	1–1–0
Jordan Spieth	2	2–2–0	0–1–0	1–0–0	1–1–0
Steve Stricker	3	3–2–0	0–1–0	2–0–0	1–1–0
Tiger Woods	4	4–1–0	1–0–0	1–1–0	2–0–0

=== International ===
Player	Points	Overall	Singles	Foursomes	Fourballs
Ángel Cabrera	2	2–2–0	1–0–0	1–0–0	0–2–0
Jason Day	3.5	3–1–1	1–0–0	0–1–1	2–0–0
Brendon de Jonge	2	2–3–0	0–1–0	2–0–0	0–2–0
Graham DeLaet	3.5	3–1–1	1–0–0	0–1–1	2–0–0
Ernie Els	3	3–2–0	1–0–0	2–0–0	0–2–0
Branden Grace	0	0–4–0	0–1–0	0–1–0	0–2–0
Marc Leishman	2	2–2–0	1–0–0	1–1–0	0–1–0
Hideki Matsuyama	1.5	1–3–1	0–1–0	1–1–0	0–1–1
Louis Oosthuizen	1.5	1–3–1	0–0–1	0–2–0	1–1–0
Charl Schwartzel	2	2–3–0	1–0–0	0–2–0	1–1–0
Adam Scott	2.5	2–2–1	1–0–0	1–1–0	0–1–1
Richard Sterne	0	0–4–0	0–1–0	0–2–0	0–1–0
