= 1994 PGA Tour =

Golf tour season

1994 PGA Tour season
- Duration: January 6, 1994 – October 30, 1994
- Number of official events: 44
- Most wins: (Zimbabwe) Nick Price (6)
- Money list: (Zimbabwe) Nick Price
- PGA Tour Player of the Year: (Zimbabwe) Nick Price
- PGA Player of the Year: (Zimbabwe) Nick Price
- Rookie of the Year: (South Africa) Ernie Els

The 1994 PGA Tour was the 79th season of the PGA Tour, the main professional golf tour in the United States. It was also the 26th season since separating from the PGA of America.

== Schedule ==
The following table lists official events during the 1994 season.

Date	Tournament	Location	Purse (US$)	Winner (Note: The number in parentheses after each winner's name is the number of PGA Tour events they had won up to and including that tournament. This information is only shown for PGA Tour members.)	OWGR points	Notes
Jan 9	Mercedes Championships	California	1,000,000	(United States) Phil Mickelson (4)	44	Winners-only event
Jan 16	United Airlines Hawaiian Open	Hawaii	1,200,000	(Australia) Brett Ogle (2)	38	
Jan 23	Northern Telecom Open	Arizona	1,100,000	(United States) Andrew Magee (4)	38	
Jan 30	Phoenix Open	Arizona	1,200,000	(United States) Bill Glasson (6)	40	
Feb 6	AT&T Pebble Beach National Pro-Am	California	1,250,000	(United States) Johnny Miller (25)	48	Pro-Am
Feb 13	Nissan Los Angeles Open	California	1,000,000	(United States) Corey Pavin (11)	50	
Feb 20	Bob Hope Chrysler Classic	California	1,100,000	(United States) Scott Hoch (5)	42	Pro-Am
Feb 27	Buick Invitational of California	California	1,100,000	(United States) Craig Stadler (11)	36	
Mar 6	Doral-Ryder Open	Florida	1,400,000	(United States) John Huston (3)	58	
Mar 13	Honda Classic	Florida	1,100,000	(Zimbabwe) Nick Price (10)	54	
Mar 20	Nestle Invitational	Florida	1,200,000	(United States) Loren Roberts (1)	66	Invitational
Mar 27	The Players Championship	Florida	2,500,000	(Australia) Greg Norman (14)	80	Flagship event
Apr 3	Freeport-McMoRan Classic	Louisiana	1,200,000	(United States) Ben Crenshaw (18)	42	
Apr 10	Masters Tournament	Georgia	2,000,000	(Spain) José María Olazábal (3)	100	Major championship
Apr 17	MCI Heritage Golf Classic	South Carolina	1,250,000	(United States) Hale Irwin (20)	48	Invitational
Apr 24	KMart Greater Greensboro Open	North Carolina	1,500,000	(United States) Mike Springer (1)	40	
May 1	Shell Houston Open	Texas	1,300,000	(United States) Mike Heinen (1)	38	
May 8	BellSouth Classic	Georgia	1,200,000	(United States) John Daly (3)	40	
May 15	GTE Byron Nelson Golf Classic	Texas	1,200,000	(United States) Neal Lancaster (1)	28	
May 22	Memorial Tournament	Ohio	1,500,000	(United States) Tom Lehman (1)	58	Invitational
May 30	Southwestern Bell Colonial	Texas	1,400,000	(Zimbabwe) Nick Price (11)	54	Invitational
Jun 5	Kemper Open	Maryland	1,300,000	(United States) Mark Brooks (4)	30	
Jun 12	Buick Classic	New York	1,200,000	(United States) Lee Janzen (4)	58	
Jun 20	U.S. Open	Pennsylvania	1,700,000	(South Africa) Ernie Els (1)	100	Major championship
Jun 26	Canon Greater Hartford Open	Connecticut	1,200,000	(South Africa) David Frost (9)	50	
Jul 3	Motorola Western Open	Illinois	1,200,000	(Zimbabwe) Nick Price (12)	48	
Jul 10	Anheuser-Busch Golf Classic	Virginia	1,100,000	(United States) Mark McCumber (8)	20	
Jul 17	The Open Championship	Scotland	£1,000,000	(Zimbabwe) Nick Price (13)	100	Major championship (Note: Unofficial money event at the time, but retrospectively counted as an official win.)
Jul 17	Deposit Guaranty Golf Classic	Mississippi	700,000	(United States) Brian Henninger (1)	20	Alternate event
Jul 24	New England Classic	Massachusetts	1,000,000	(United States) Kenny Perry (2)	24	
Jul 31	Federal Express St. Jude Classic	Tennessee	1,250,000	(United States) Dicky Pride (1)	42	
Aug 7	Buick Open	Michigan	1,100,000	(United States) Fred Couples (11)	50	
Aug 14	PGA Championship	Oklahoma	1,750,000	(Zimbabwe) Nick Price (14)	100	Major championship
Aug 21	Sprint International	Colorado	1,400,000	(United States) Steve Lowery (1)	56	
Aug 28	NEC World Series of Golf	Ohio	2,000,000	(Spain) José María Olazábal (4)	62	Limited-field event
Sep 4	Greater Milwaukee Open	Wisconsin	1,000,000	(United States) Mike Springer (2)	26	
Sep 11	Bell Canadian Open	Canada	1,300,000	(Zimbabwe) Nick Price (15)	52	
Sep 18	B.C. Open	New York	900,000	(United States) Mike Sullivan (3)	24	
Sep 25	Hardee's Golf Classic	Illinois	1,000,000	(United States) Mark McCumber (9)	30	
Oct 2	Buick Southern Open	Georgia	800,000	(Australia) Steve Elkington (4)	20	
Oct 9	Walt Disney World/Oldsmobile Classic	Florida	1,100,000	(United States) Rick Fehr (2)	40	
Oct 16	Texas Open	Texas	1,000,000	(United States) Bob Estes (1)	46	
Oct 23	Las Vegas Invitational	Nevada	1,500,000	(United States) Bruce Lietzke (13)	44	
Oct 30	The Tour Championship	California	3,000,000	(United States) Mark McCumber (10)	56	Tour Championship

=== Unofficial events ===
The following events were sanctioned by the PGA Tour, but did not carry official money, nor were wins official.

Date	Tournament	Location	Purse ($)	Winner(s)	OWGR points	Notes
Sep 18	Presidents Cup	Virginia	n/a	Team USA	n/a	New tournament Team event
Nov 6	Sarazen World Open	Georgia	1,900,000	(South Africa) Ernie Els	36	New tournament
Nov 6	Lincoln-Mercury Kapalua International	Hawaii	1,000,000	(United States) Fred Couples	34	
Nov 9	PGA Grand Slam of Golf	Hawaii	1,000,000	(Australia) Greg Norman	n/a	Limited-field event
Nov 13	World Cup of Golf	Puerto Rico	1,200,000	(United States) Fred Couples and (United States) Davis Love III	n/a	Team event
Nov 13	World Cup of Golf Individual Trophy	Puerto Rico	1,200,000	(United States) Fred Couples	n/a	
Nov 20	Franklin Funds Shark Shootout	California	1,100,000	(United States) Fred Couples and (United States) Brad Faxon	n/a	Team event
Nov 27	Skins Game	California	540,000	(United States) Tom Watson	n/a	Limited-field event
Dec 4	JCPenney Classic	Florida	1,200,000	(United States) Brad Bryant and (Spain) Marta Figueras-Dotti	n/a	Team event
Dec 11	Diners Club Matches	California	890,000	(United States) Jeff Maggert and (United States) Jim McGovern	n/a	New tournament Team event

== Money list ==
The money list was based on prize money won during the season, calculated in U.S. dollars.

Position	Player	Prize money ($)
1	(Zimbabwe) Nick Price	1,499,927
2	(Australia) Greg Norman	1,330,307
3	(United States) Mark McCumber	1,208,209
4	(United States) Tom Lehman	1,031,144
5	(United States) Fuzzy Zoeller	1,016,804
6	(United States) Loren Roberts	1,015,671
7	(Spain) José María Olazábal	969,900
8	(United States) Corey Pavin	906,305
9	(United States) Jeff Maggert	814,475
10	(United States) Hale Irwin	814,436

== Awards ==
Award	Winner	Ref.
PGA Tour Player of the Year (Jack Nicklaus Trophy)	(Zimbabwe) Nick Price	
PGA Player of the Year	(Zimbabwe) Nick Price	
Rookie of the Year	(South Africa) Ernie Els	
Scoring leader (PGA Tour – Byron Nelson Award)	(Australia) Greg Norman	
Scoring leader (PGA – Vardon Trophy)	(Australia) Greg Norman	
Comeback Player of the Year	(United States) Hal Sutton	

== See also ==
- 1994 Nike Tour
- 1994 Senior PGA Tour
