= Mount Edgecombe Trophy =

Tournament information
- Location: Mount Edgecombe, KwaZulu-Natal, South Africa
- Established: 1993
- Course: Mount Edgecombe Country Club
- Par: 72
- Length: 6,825 yards (6,241 m)
- Tour: Sunshine Tour
- Format: Stroke play
- Prize fund: R 500,000
- Month played: February/March
- Final year: 2008

Tournament record score
- Aggregate: 275 Tony Johnstone (1994); 275 Bruce Vaughan (1994); 275 Darren Fichardt (2008); 275 Mark Murless (2008)
- To par: −13 as above

Final champion
- (South Africa) Mark Murless
- Location in South Africa Location in KwaZulu-Natal

The Mount Edgecombe Trophy was a golf tournament that was played on the Sunshine Tour. Formed in 1993, it included a deep international field of not only Africans, but drawing names like Vijay Singh, whose best finish in the event was a tie for 3rd in 1993. It was one of the richest purses on the Sunshine Tour at the time with a first place winners share of R 71,100. The inaugural champion was Retief Goosen. The 1994 champion was Bruce Vaughan, the first American to win the event.

== Winners ==
Year	Winner	Score	To par	Margin of victory	Runner(s)-up
Mount Edgecombe Trophy
2008	(South Africa) Mark Murless	275	−13	Playoff	(South Africa) Darren Fichardt
2007	(South Africa) Steve van Vuuren	276	−12	1 stroke	(South Africa) Desvonde Botes (South Africa) Des Terblanche (South Africa) Tjaart van der Walt
1995–2006: No tournament
Autopage Mount Edgecombe Trophy
1994	(United States) Bruce Vaughan	275	−13	Playoff	(Zimbabwe) Tony Johnstone
Mount Edgecombe Trophy
1993	(South Africa) Retief Goosen	279	−9	5 strokes	(Zimbabwe) Nick Price
