= Bellerive Country Club =

Country club in Missouri, U.S.

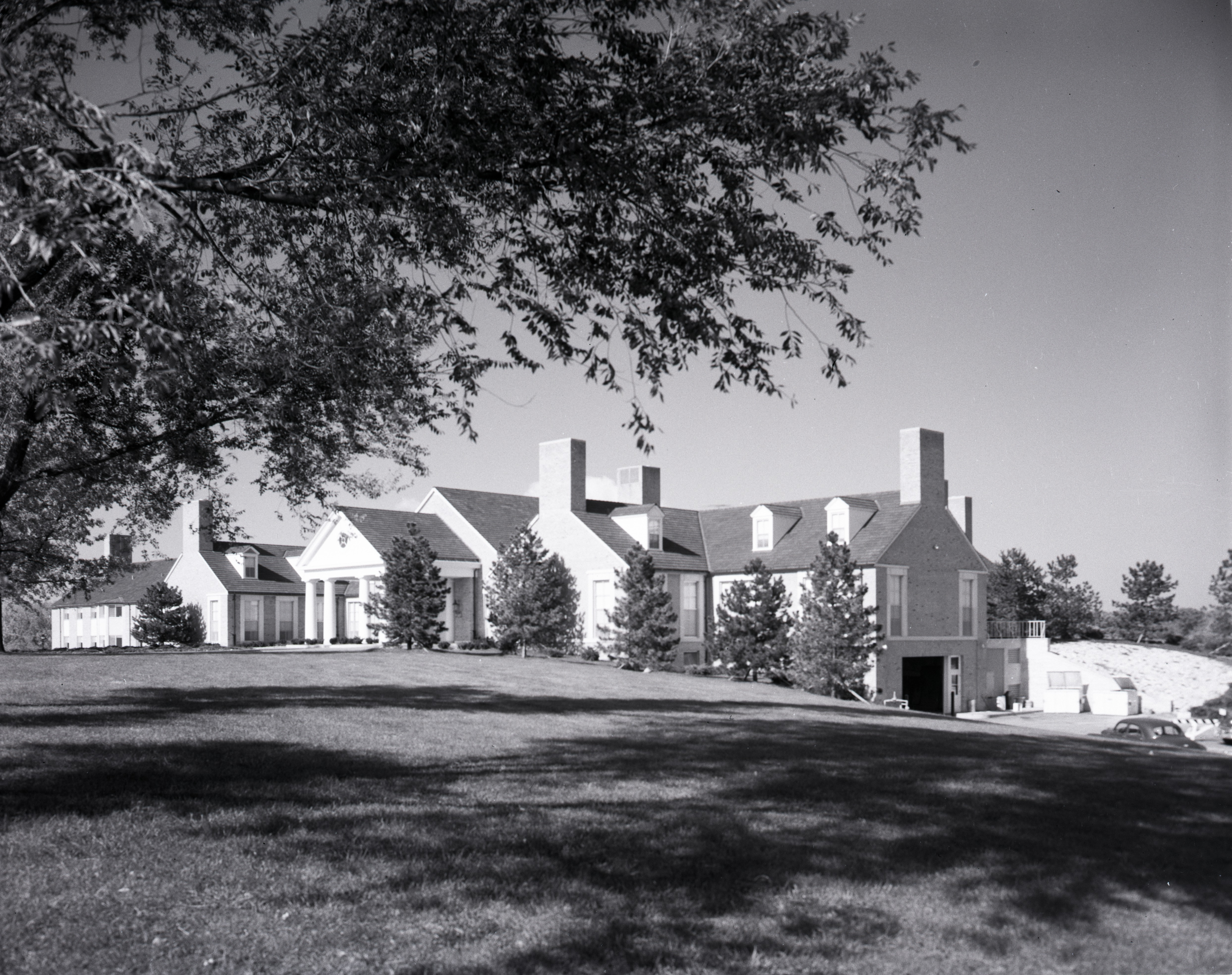
- Clubhouse in 1960

- Location within the United States Location within Missouri
- 38.66°N 90.483°W

Club information
- Location: Town and Country, Missouri
- Elevation: 530 feet (160 m)
- Established: 1897, 129 years ago 1960 (current course)
- Type: Private
- Total holes: 18
- Tournaments: PGA Championship (1992, 2018); U.S. Open (1965); Western Open (1953)
- Greens: Bentgrass
- Fairways: Zoysia grass
- Website: bellerivecc.org
- Designed by: Robert Trent Jones
- Par: 71
- Length: 7,547 yards (6,901 m)
- Course rating: 76.3
- Slope rating: 141

Bellerive Country Club is a golf country club in the central United States, located in Town and Country, Missouri, a suburb west of St. Louis. Established in 1897, it is considered one of the "big four" old-line elite St. Louis clubs, along with Old Warson, Westwood, and St. Louis Country Club. The course has hosted three major championships: the U.S. Open in 1965, and the PGA Championship in 1992 and 2018. The club's members, who kept themselves all-white for nearly a century, admitted their first Black member in 1991.

== History ==
The club opened in 1897 as The Field Club, founded by several St. Louis sportsmen who wanted a place for golf and other leisure activities. They built a 9-hole golf course northwest of the city on land leased from the estate of War of 1812 war hero Daniel Bissell. Another nine holes were added some years later.

In 1910, the club moved to nearby Normandy, built a new course with a Georgian-style clubhouse, and renamed itself Bellerive Country Club after Louis Groston de Saint-Ange de Bellerive, who served as the last French governor of Illinois Country in 1765. Bellerive's first notable event was the 1949 Western Amateur Championship. Four years later, it hosted the PGA Tour's Western Open, won by Dutch Harrison.

In 1957, Bellerive put its 125-acre (0.5 km^{2}) Normandy site on the market for $1.3 million. At the same time, the Normandy School District began discussing its desire to establish a junior college as an affordable alternative to the area's private Washington University and Saint Louis University. The club lowered the price to $600,000 and the Normandy Residence Center opened in a renovated clubhouse in 1960 with classes taught by the University of Missouri; the campus became the University of Missouri–St. Louis in 1963 and the nearby village is Bellerive.

=== Current location ===
In 1959, the club moved southwest to its current site in the suburb of Town and Country. Robert Trent Jones designed the new course, which opened in 1960 on Memorial Day. Five years later, Bellerive hosted its first USGA championship and major championship, the U.S. Open in 1965, in which Gary Player won in a Monday playoff over Kel Nagle. It was the first U.S. Open scheduled for a Sunday final round; previously the third and fourth rounds were played on Saturday. Player was the first foreign-born player to win the U.S. Open in 38 years, and completed the career Grand Slam at age 29, a year before Jack Nicklaus did. It was the fourth of Player's nine major titles and his only victory in the U.S. Open; he won with fiberglass-shafted golf clubs, and donated his winner's check to charity.

Bellerive hosted the inaugural U.S. Mid-Amateur in 1981, won by Jim Holtgrieve.

Like many clubs of its era, Bellerive's members long kept themselves all-white. In 1988, the club's president told a newspaper, "To the best of my knowledge, no black has ever been proposed for membership." But social pressure was building; appointees to high public office began to draw criticism for belonging to all-white clubs; later, the PGA withdrew agreements to hold tournaments at such clubs. In 1991, Bellerive admitted its first Black member, David B. Price Jr, an executive at Monsanto.

The following year, the club hosted its second major, the 1992 PGA Championship. Nick Price won with a score of 278 (–6), three strokes ahead of four runners-up; it was the first of his three major titles.

The U.S. Mid-Amateur was held at Old Warson Golf Club in 1999, and Bellerive was used in the 36-hole stroke play qualifying portion. In 2001, the course was hosting practice rounds for the WGC-American Express Championship scheduled for September 13–16, but the event was cancelled after the terrorist attacks on the morning of the practice rounds. The U.S. Senior Open, a senior major, was held at the course in 2004 and won by Peter Jacobsen.

In September 2008, the course hosted the BMW Championship (formerly the Western Open), the third of the four-part FedEx Cup playoffs. The top 70 players on the points list competed for the final 30 spots in The Tour Championship, and it was won by Camilo Villegas. Bellerive hosted another senior major in 2013, the Senior PGA Championship, won by Japanese pro Kōki Idoki. It hosted the PGA Championship in 2018, won by Brooks Koepka, two strokes ahead of Tiger Woods with a score of 264 that tied the lowest 72-hole score for a major championship of 264.

== Tournaments hosted ==
Year	Championship	Winner	Winner's share ($)
1965	**U.S. Open**	(South Africa) Gary Player	26,000
1981	U.S. Mid-Amateur	(United States) Jim Holtgrieve	—N/a
1992	**PGA Championship**	(Zimbabwe) Nick Price	280,000
2004	**U.S. Senior Open**	(United States) Peter Jacobsen	470,000
2008	BMW Championship	(Colombia) Camilo Villegas	1,260,000
2013	**Senior PGA Championship**	(Japan) Kōki Idoki	378,000
2018	**PGA Championship**	(United States) Brooks Koepka	1,980,000
2026	BMW Championship	(United States) Wyndham Clark	3,600,000

- **Bold** indicates major championship

The course also hosted the practice rounds for the WGC-American Express Championship in September 2001, but the event was abandoned after the terrorist attacks on the morning of Tuesday practice rounds.

=== Future events ===
- 2030 Presidents Cup

== Course ==
Bellerive is a long course, measuring 7,547 yards (6,901 m) from the championship tees and 6,976 yards (6,379 m) from the members' tees, at par 72. However, the 10th hole is often played as a par 4 in professional events, making the course a par 71. Bellerive has a course and slope rating of 76.3/141 from the championship tees. It has six par fours that measure over 450 yards (410 m) from the championship tees, the fifth-most among courses that have hosted the U.S. Open. The longest of these is the 519-yard (475 m) tenth hole, which doglegs left around a bunker and then heads downhill across a creek that crosses the fairway about 30 yards (27 m) from the green.

Bellerive was built around a large creek that comes into play on nine of the holes. Water hazards come into play on 11 holes, and the course is known for its large and undulating greens. Bent grass is used for the greens, and zoysia grass is used for the fairways.

The entire course underwent a $9.5 million renovation in 2005-06, when the county needed to install new sewer lines under most of the course. The redesign was done by Rees Jones, who lengthened and toughened U.S. Open courses Winged Foot and Torrey Pines Golf Course. The most notable renovations that the "Open Doctor" imposed on Bellerive can be found on holes 2, 7, and 8. Hole 2 used to be tight par 4 with a sharp dogleg left around a group of trees and small lake with a prominent bunker guarding the right side. Jones removed the trees along the left and expanded the lake to create a risk-reward tee shot. The lake now stretches all the way to the green, creating a difficult back left pin position.

For Hole 7, which used to be a straight but narrow par 4 with bunkers guarding both sides of the landing area, Jones recreated the bunker complex on the right side of the hole to punish any player who bails out of a swing. Jones also moved the green back and to the left in order to bring the creek into play, once again, creating a tough back left pin location.

Hole 8 has always been one of the toughest on the course due to the double dogleg (first left and then right) and creek that lines the right side. Prior to Jones' redesigns, the tee boxes for the hole were all on the left side of the creek which meant that the tee shot needed to be a right-to-left hook that curved around the trees on the left, but avoided the creek on the right. The creek on the right was lined with mature trees which sometimes knocked errant shots headed for doom back onto the fairway in prime position. Jones eliminated this randomness in his redesign by cutting down most of the trees that lined the creek. Also, Jones moved the back tees to the right side of the creek so a straighter drive would function. However, Jones added a deep, massive bunker on the inside (left) of the first dogleg to punish the greedy player. The bunker has since been removed and the fairway has been widened. This gives players a better chance to reach the green in two strokes.

Hole 11 has also undergone a few minor changes. All of the tee boxes have been moved up roughly 50 yards, creating a risk reward driveable par 4.

Other renovations include,

- Hole 1 (fairway and green bunker complexes)
- Hole 3 (tee boxes)
- Hole 4 (fairway and green bunker complexes)
- Hole 5 (green bunker complexes)
- Hole 6 (green redesign and bunker complexes)
- Hole 9 (fairway and green bunker complexes)
- Hole 10 (fairway and green bunker complexes)
- Hole 11 (fairway and green bunker complexes)
- Hole 12 (fairway and green bunker complexes, and tee boxes)
- Hole 13 (green bunker complexes)
- Hole 14 (fairway and green bunker complexes, tree removal)
- Hole 15 (fairway and green bunker complexes)
- Hole 16 (green bunker complexes)
- Hole 17 (fairway and green bunker complexes, lake removal)
- Hole 18 (fairway and green bunker complexes)

== Scorecard ==
Bellerive Country Club
Tee	Rating/Slope	1	2	3	4	5	6	7	8	9	Out	10	11	12	13	14	15	16	17	18	In	Total
Black	76.5 / 141	438	413	194	575	473	215	397	618	445	3768	519	376	482	184	415	494	237	608	464	3779	7547
Gold	75.7 / 137	435	407	188	562	468	209	391	610	437	3707	515	374	452	180	410	490	232	597	460	3710	7417
Blue	73.3 / 133	420	375	177	547	438	189	373	555	408	3482	515	342	417	164	381	449	196	591	422	3477	6959
Green	71.2 / 128	392	341	149	514	374	166	342	549	388	3215	506	326	374	156	372	423	175	531	403	3266	6481
White	69.0 / 127	383	323	115	488	346	136	335	507	349	2982	471	291	366	129	343	373	164	509	388	3034	6016
Par	Men's	4	4	3	5	4	3	4	5	4	36	4	4	4	3	4	4	3	5	4	35	71
SI	Men's	9	7	11	17	1	5	15	13	3		16	8	6	18	12	2	14	10	4
Silver	72.0 / 127	346	323	115	449	329	136	294	462	297	2751	410	291	366	129	255	260	126	509	305	2651	5402
Red	70.5 / 125	346	277	88	449	329	112	294	462	297	2654	410	259	306	123	255	260	126	419	305	2463	5117
Par	Women's	4	4	3	5	4	3	4	5	4	36	5	4	4	3	4	4	3	5	4	36	72
SI	Women's	5	11	17	1	7	13	15	3	9		4	10	6	18	12	16	14	2	8

== See also ==
- Algonquin Golf Club
