= Mizuho Americas Open =

Golf tournament

Tournament information
- Location: West Caldwell, New Jersey
- Established: 2023
- Course: Mountain Ridge Country Club
- Par: 72
- Length: 6,735 yards (6,158 m)
- Tour: LPGA Tour
- Format: 72 holes Stroke play
- Prize fund: $3,250,000
- Month played: May

Tournament record score
- Aggregate: 271 Jeeno Thitikul
- To par: −17 as above

Current champion
- (Thailand) Jeeno Thitikul

The Mizuho Americas Open is a women's professional golf tournament on the LPGA Tour. Established in 2023, the tournament was held at Liberty National Golf Club in Jersey City, New Jersey, for its first three editions before moving to Mountain Ridge Country Club in West Caldwell, New Jersey, in 2026. The event is scheduled to remain at Mountain Ridge in 2027 before returning to Liberty National in 2028.

The tournament features 120 LPGA players competing alongside 24 top-ranked junior girls from the American Junior Golf Association (AJGA), with the juniors playing in a separate Stableford competition. The tournament had a prize fund of $2.75 million in its inaugural year, increasing to $3.25 million by 2026.

== History ==
The inaugural tournament in June 2023 was won by Rose Zhang, who defeated Jennifer Kupcho on the second hole of a sudden-death playoff in her first tournament as a professional. Zhang became the first player to win in her professional debut on the LPGA Tour since Beverly Hanson in 1951 and the most recent non-member to win in her first LPGA event since Hinako Shibuno in 2019.

In 2026, the tournament moved to Mountain Ridge Country Club, which had previously hosted the 2021 Cognizant Founders Cup. Jeeno Thitikul defended her title, shooting a final-round 69 to finish at 13-under-par 275 and defeat Yin Ruoning by four strokes.

The tournament is hosted by Michelle Wie West, with Mizuho Financial Group serving as title sponsor.

== Course ==
The tournament was held at Liberty National Golf Club in Jersey City, New Jersey, from 2023 to 2025. In 2026, it moved to Mountain Ridge Country Club in West Caldwell, New Jersey, where it is scheduled to remain in 2027 before returning to Liberty National in 2028.

Liberty National Golf Club sits adjacent to Liberty State Park on the Upper New York Bay. It has previously hosted PGA Tour Playoff events and the 2017 Presidents Cup. Mountain Ridge Country Club previously hosted the 2021 Cognizant Founders Cup, where Ko Jin-young won with an 18-under-par score of 266.

== Winners ==
Year	Date	Champion	Country	Score	To par	Margin of victory	Runner-up	Venue	Purse ($)	Winner's share
2026	May 10	Jeeno Thitikul (2)	Thailand	67-69-70-69=275	−13	4 strokes	(China) Yin Ruoning	Mountain Ridge	3,250,000	487,500
2025	May 11	Jeeno Thitikul	Thailand	64-73-65-69=271	−17	4 strokes	(France) Céline Boutier	Liberty National	3,000,000	450,000
2024	May 19	Nelly Korda	United States	70-68-65-71=274	−14	1 stroke	(Australia) Hannah Green	Liberty National	3,000,000	450,000
2023	Jun 4	Rose Zhang	United States	70-69-66-74=279	−9	Playoff	(United States) Jennifer Kupcho	Liberty National	2,750,000	412,500

== Tournament records ==
Year	Player	Score	Round
2024	Hannah Green	63 (−9)	3rd
