= Robert Trent Jones Golf Club =

Private golf club in Gainesville, Virginia

- Location in the United States Location in Virginia
- 38.776°N 77.639°W

Club information
- Location: Gainesville, Virginia
- Established: 1991, 35 years ago
- Type: Private
- Total holes: 18
- Website: www.rtjgc.com
- Designed by: Robert Trent Jones
- Par: 72
- Length: 7,425 yards (6,789 m)
- Course rating: 75.8
- Slope rating: 145

Robert Trent Jones Golf Club (RTJ) is a private golf club located in Gainesville, Virginia, a suburb southwest of Washington D.C. The par 72 course opened in 1991 and plays between 5,570 and 7,425 yards (5,093 and 6,789 m).

== Founding and premises ==
RTJ was founded by the legendary golf course designer Robert Trent Jones. Located about 30 miles (50 km) from downtown Washington D.C., the course is on Lake Manassas, an 850-acre (3.4 km^{2}) reservoir. The course opened for play in April 1991.

RTJ has a clubhouse that is a 65,000-square-foot (6,040 m^{2}) Georgian-style mansion. The club does not allow for residential development, but does allow members of the club to construct cottages. Although there is water around the golf course, the only holes where a player has to fly the ball over open water are the par-three fourth and eleventh holes.

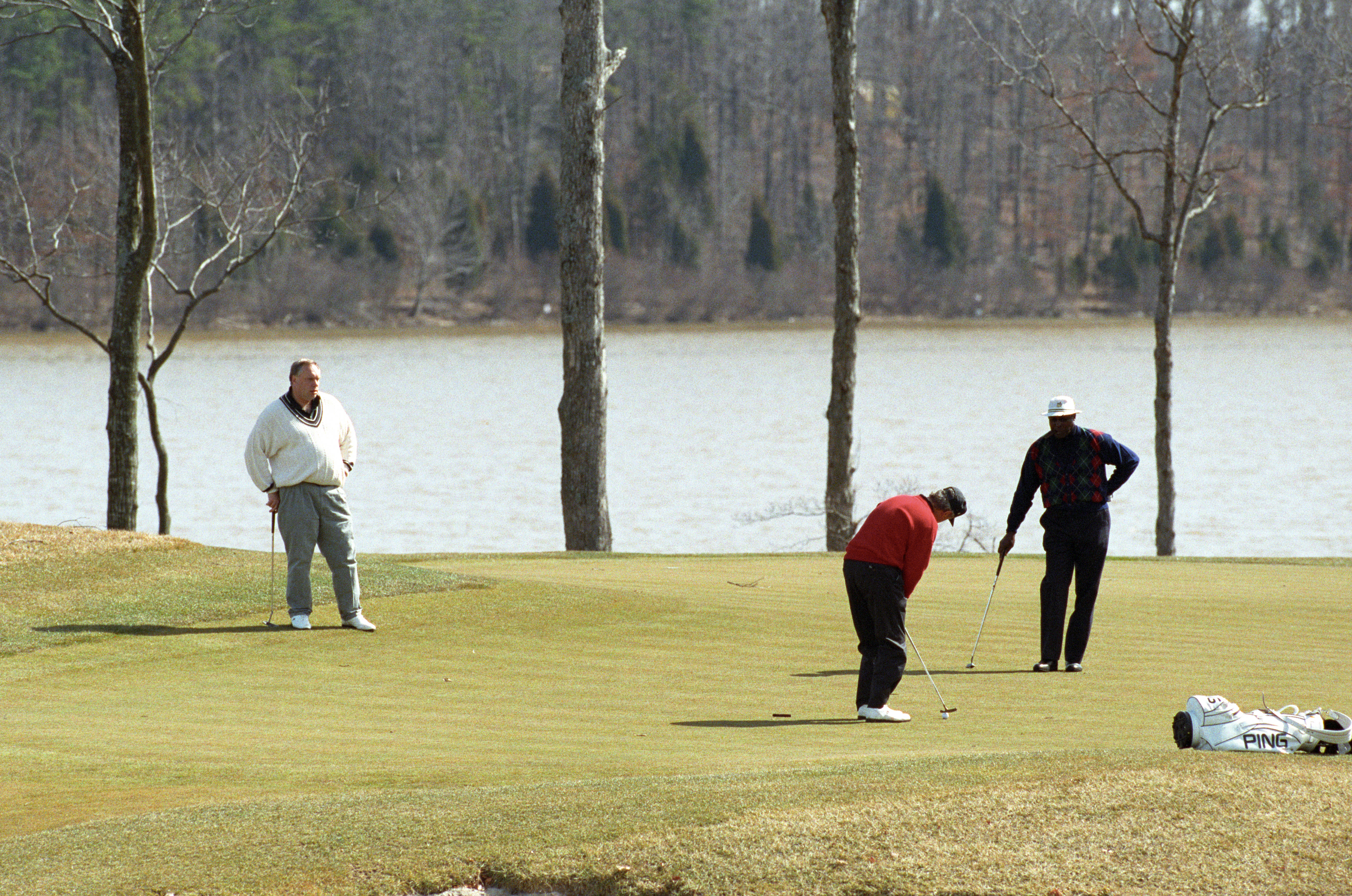
President Bill Clinton playing golf with Webster Hubbell and Vernon Jordan at the golf club in 1993.

== Events ==
=== Presidents Cup ===
The course hosted the inaugural Presidents Cup in 1994, and again in 1996, 2000, and 2005. The United States defeated the International teams on all four occasions.

- 1994: The United States Team defeated the International Team by a score of 20 to 12.
- 1996: The U.S. team won 16½ to 15½ in the second playing of the competition.
- 2000: The U.S. team won 21½ to 10½ in the fourth playing of the competition.
- 2005: The U.S. team won 18½ to 15½ in the sixth playing of the competition.

=== PGA Tour ===
The course hosted an event on the PGA Tour in 2015, Tiger Woods' Quicken Loans National. The tournament was won by Troy Merritt, his first victory on tour.

=== Solheim Cup ===
The course hosted the 2024 Solheim Cup tournament. The U.S. team won 15½ to 12½.

== Members ==
In 2017, former President Barack Obama joined the club.
