= 1992 PGA Championship =

Coordinates: 38.66°N 90.483°W

Tournament information
- Dates: August 13–16, 1992
- Location: Town and Country, Missouri
- Course: Bellerive Country Club
- Organized by: PGA of America
- Tour: PGA Tour

Statistics
- Par: 71
- Length: 7,148 yards (6,536 m)
- Field: 156 players, 85 after cut
- Cut: 148 (+6)
- Prize fund: $1.6 million
- Winner's share: $280,000

Champion
- (Zimbabwe) Nick Price
- 278 (−6)

The 1992 PGA Championship was the 74th PGA Championship, held August 13–16 at Bellerive Country Club in Town and Country, Missouri, a suburb west of St. Louis. Nick Price won the first of his three major championships, three strokes ahead of runners-up John Cook, Nick Faldo, Jim Gallagher Jr., and Gene Sauers. The previous year, after the birth of his first child, Price withdrew from the 1991 PGA Championship, which allowed John Daly to enter and win.

This was the second major championship at Bellerive, which hosted the U.S. Open in 1965; the PGA Championship returned in 2018.

== Course layout ==
Hole	Yards	Par	Hole	Yards	Par
1	434	4	10	485	4
2	437	4	11	373	4
3	165	3	12	404	4
4	556	5	13	179	3
5	453	4	14	411	4
6	195	3	15	456	4
7	381	4	16	222	3
8	581	5	17	536	5
9	426	4	18	454	4
Out	3,628	36	In	3,520	35
Source:		Total		7,148	71

Length of the course for its previous major championship:

- 7,191 yards (6,575 m), par 70 - 1965 U.S. Open

== Round summaries ==
=== First round ===
Thursday, August 13, 1992

Place	Player	Score	To par
T1	(United States) Gene Sauers	67	−4
T1	(United States) Craig Stadler	67	−4
T3	(United States) Jay Don Blake	68	−3
T3	(United States) Brian Claar	68	−3
T3	(England) Nick Faldo	68	−3
T6	(United States) Russ Cochran	69	−2
T6	(United States) Fred Couples	69	−2
T6	(United States) Bob Estes	69	−2
T6	(United States) Raymond Floyd	69	−2
T6	(United States) Robert Gamez	69	−2
T6	(New Zealand) Frank Nobilo	69	−2

=== Second round ===
Friday, August 14, 1992

Place	Player	Score	To par
1	(United States) Gene Sauers	67-69=136	−6
T2	(United States) Russ Cochran	69-69=138	−4
T2	(United States) Jim Gallagher Jr.	72-66=138	−4
T2	(England) Nick Faldo	68-70=138	−4
T5	(England) Steven Richardson	73-66=139	−3
T5	(United States) Craig Stadler	67-72=139	−3
T7	(United States) Rocco Mediate	72-68=140	−2
T7	(United States) Gil Morgan	71-69=140	−2
T7	(United States) Larry Nelson	72-68=140	−2
T7	(Zimbabwe) Nick Price	70-70=140	−2

=== Third round ===
Saturday, August 15, 1992

Place	Player	Score	To par
1	(United States) Gene Sauers	67-69-70=206	−7
T2	(United States) Jeff Maggert	71-72-65=208	−5
T2	(Zimbabwe) Nick Price	70-70-68=208	−5
T4	(United States) Jim Gallagher Jr.	72-66-72=210	−3
T4	(United States) John Cook	72-71-67=210	−3
6	(United States) Mark Brooks	71-72-68=211	−2
T7	(United States) Billy Andrade	72-71-70=213	E
T7	(United States) Paul Azinger	72-73-68=213	E
T7	(United States) Raymond Floyd	69-75-69=213	E
T7	(United States) Dan Forsman	70-73-70=213	E
T7	(United States) Gil Morgan	71-69-73=213	E

=== Final round ===
Sunday, August 16, 1992

Place	Player	Score	To par	Money ($)
1	(Zimbabwe) Nick Price	70-70-68-70=278	−6	280,000
T2	(United States) John Cook	71-72-67-71=281	−3	101,250
T2	(England) Nick Faldo	68-70-76-67=281	−3	101,250
T2	(United States) Jim Gallagher Jr.	72-66-72-71=281	−3	101,250
T2	(United States) Gene Sauers	67-69-70-75=281	−3	101,250
6	(United States) Jeff Maggert	71-72-65-74=282	−2	60,000
T7	(United States) Russ Cochran	69-69-76-69=283	−1	52,500
T7	(United States) Dan Forsman	70-73-70-70=283	−1	52,500
T9	(United States) Brian Claar	68-73-73-70=284	E	40,000
T9	(Sweden) Anders Forsbrand	73-71-70-70=284	E	40,000
T9	(United States) Duffy Waldorf	74-73-68-69=284	E	40,000
