= 1993–94 Southern Africa Tour =

Golf tour season

1993–94 Southern Africa Tour season
- Duration: 18 November 1993 – 13 February 1994
- Number of official events: 9
- Most wins: (Zimbabwe) Tony Johnstone (3)
- Order of Merit: (Zimbabwe) Tony Johnstone
- Rookie of the Year: (South Africa) Brenden Pappas

The 1993–94 Southern Africa Tour, titled as the 1993–94 FNB Tour for sponsorship reasons, was the 23rd season of the Southern Africa Tour, the main professional golf tour in South Africa since it was formed in 1971.

It was the second season of the tour under a title sponsorship agreement with First National Bank, that began in 1992.

== Season outline ==
Zimbabweans Mark McNulty, Tony Johnstone, and Nick Price had much success at the beginning of the season. McNulty won the first tournament of the year, the FNB Players Championship. Johnstone then won two national opens early in the season, the Zimbabwe Open and Philips South African Open. At the unofficial Nedbank Million Dollar Challenge, meanwhile, Price scored four rounds in the mid-60s to defeat runner-up McNulty by 12 strokes. "Without a doubt it's the finest four rounds of golf I've ever put together in my life," he said after the event. Johnstone won the next event, the Bell's Cup. It was his fourth consecutive win on the Southern Africa Tour going back to last season. It tied Gary Player's winning streak. The following week, at the Lexington PGA Championship, David Frost defeated runner-up Price by seven shots. Days later, Price opened with an eleven-under 61 at the ICL International. He broke the course record at Zwartkop Country Club by three strokes and tied for the lowest round ever on the Southern Africa Tour. Price would go to win by nine over Frost and American Bruce Vaughan. It was his third win at the event.

A variety of little known overseas golfers had success over the remainder of the season. The seventh tournament, the Telkom South African Masters, was won by Englishman Chris Davison. It was first win on tour. The following event, the Hollard Royal Swazi Sun Classic, was won by American Omar Uresti. He defeated fellow American Andrew Pitts by two shots. The final event of the season, the Autopage Mount Edgecombe Trophy, was won by American Bruce Vaughan.

== Schedule ==
The following table lists official events during the 1993–94 season.

Date	Tournament	Location	Purse (R)	Winner (Note: The number in brackets after each winner's name is the number of Southern Africa Tour events they had won up to and including that tournament. This information is only shown for Southern Africa Tour members.)	OWGR points	Notes
21 Nov	FNB Players Championship	Transvaal	550,000	(Zimbabwe) Mark McNulty (23)	16	
28 Nov	Zimbabwe Open	Zimbabwe	300,000	(Zimbabwe) Tony Johnstone (14)	22	
12 Dec	Phillips South African Open	Natal	550,000	(Zimbabwe) Tony Johnstone (15)	20	
9 Jan	Bell's Cup	Cape	500,000	(Zimbabwe) Tony Johnstone (16)	22	
16 Jan	Lexington PGA Championship	Transvaal	550,000	(South Africa) David Frost (4)	30	
23 Jan	ICL International	Transvaal	500,000	(Zimbabwe) Nick Price (6)	26	
30 Jan	Telkom South African Masters	Transvaal	500,000	(England) Chris Davison (1)	14	
6 Feb	Hollard Royal Swazi Sun Classic	Swaziland	400,000	(United States) Omar Uresti (1)	12	
13 Feb	Autopage Mount Edgecombe Trophy	Natal	500,000	(United States) Bruce Vaughan (1)	16	

=== Unofficial events ===
The following events were sanctioned by the Southern Africa Tour, but did not carry official money, nor were wins official.

Date	Tournament	Location	Purse (R)	Winner	OWGR points	Notes
5 Dec	Nedbank Million Dollar Challenge	Transvaal	US$2,500,000	(Zimbabwe) Nick Price	48	Limited-field event

== Order of Merit ==
The Order of Merit was based on prize money won during the season, calculated in South African rand.

Position	Player	Prize money (R)
1	(Zimbabwe) Tony Johnstone	297,359
2	(United States) Bruce Vaughan	189,453
3	(South Africa) Ernie Els	160,410
4	(England) Chris Davison	156,219
5	(South Africa) Roger Wessels	135,518

== Awards ==
Award	Winner	Ref.
Rookie of the Year (Bobby Locke Trophy)	(South Africa) Brenden Pappas	
