= 1979–80 Southern Africa Tour =

Golf tour season

1979–80 Southern Africa Tour season
- Duration: 22 October 1979 – 9 February 1980
- Number of official events: 11
- Most wins: (South Africa) Gary Player (4)
- Order of Merit: (South Africa) Gary Player

The 1979–80 Southern Africa Tour was the ninth season of the Southern Africa Tour, the main professional golf tour in South Africa since it was formed in 1971.

== Season outline ==
Early in the year, a number of young golfers won their first events on tour, including future stars Nick Price and Nick Faldo. It was veteran Gary Player, however, who had the most success, winning four consecutive events in the middle of the year to capture Order of Merit honours by a wide margin.

In the first event of the season, the Asseng TV Challenge Series, Zimbabwean Nick Price won, defeating joint runner-ups John Bland, Allan Henning, and Phil Simmons. It was his first win on his home tour. Simmons won the next tournament, the Victoria Falls Classic. It was also his first win on his home tour. The fourth tournament of the year, the ICL International was played at Royal Johannesburg & Kensington Golf Club. In the final round, 22-year-old Englishman Nick Faldo scored a final round 65 to defeat Henning by two shots. His score tied the course record. It was his first win in South Africa.

Legend Gary Player dominated the remainder of the year. In late November, at the Lexington PGA Championship, he opened with an aggregate of 203 (–7) to take the solo lead. He was then declared winner as the final round was cancelled due to heavy rain. The following week, at the SAB South African Masters, Player was tied with Irishman John O'Leary entering the final round. However, Player outshot O'Leary by six in the final round to win easily. The British Airways/Yellow Pages South African Open came next. Player was the clubhouse leader but one behind England's Ian Mosey. However, Mosey double-bogeyed the final hole, including a missed 18-inch putt which would have tied. The following week, at the Sun City Classic, Player won his fourth tournament in a row, defeating Bobby Verwey by four shots. This winning streak set a tour record.

== Schedule ==
The following table lists official events during the 1979–80 season.

Date	Tournament	Location	Purse (R)	Winner (Note: The number in brackets after each winner's name is the number of Southern Africa Tour events they had won up to and including that tournament. This information is only shown for Southern Africa Tour members.)	Notes
25 Oct	Asseng TV Challenge Series	Transvaal	27,500	(Zimbabwe Rhodesia) Nick Price (1)	New tournament
3 Nov	Victoria Falls Classic	Rhodesia	15,000	(South Africa) Phil Simmons (1)	
11 Nov	Zimbabwe-Rhodesia Open	Rhodesia	30,000	(South Africa) Simon Hobday (3)	New tournament
17 Nov	ICL International	Transvaal	40,000	(England) Nick Faldo (1)	
23 Nov	Lexington PGA Championship	Transvaal	80,000	(South Africa) Gary Player (15)	
1 Dec	SAB South African Masters	Cape	80,000	(South Africa) Gary Player (16)	
8 Dec	British Airways/Yellow Pages South African Open	Transvaal	65,000	(South Africa) Gary Player (17)	
15 Dec	Sun City Classic	Transvaal	100,000	(South Africa) Gary Player (18)	New tournament
19 Jan	Kalahari Classic	Botswana	20,000	(South Africa) Tienie Britz (4)	
26 Jan	Orkney Open	Transvaal	30,000	(South Africa) Allan Henning (7)	New tournament
9 Feb	Holiday Inns Invitational	Swaziland	30,000	(Southern Rhodesia) Mark McNulty (1)	

== Order of Merit ==
The Order of Merit was based on prize money won during the season, calculated in South African rand.

Position	Player	Prize money (R)
1	(South Africa) Gary Player	49,680
2	(Southern Rhodesia) Nick Price	21,489
3	(Southern Rhodesia) Denis Watson	21,462
4	(South Africa) Allan Henning	20,817
5	(South Africa) Bobby Verwey	20,311
