= 2005 Presidents Cup =

Golf match in Virginia, US

- Dates: September 22–25, 2005
- Venue: Robert Trent Jones Golf Club
- Location: Gainesville, Virginia, U.S.
- Captains: Jack Nicklaus (USA); Gary Player (International)
USA	18 1/2	15 1/2	International
- United States wins the Presidents Cup

Location map
- Location within the United States Location within Virginia

The 2005 Presidents Cup was held between September 22 and 25, 2005. It was played at the Robert Trent Jones Golf Club in Gainesville, Virginia, United States. The United States team won the competition by a margin of 18 1/2–15 1/2. The honorary chairmen was former President of the United States George H. W. Bush.

== Format ==
Both teams had 12 players plus a non-playing captain. The competition was four days long with 34 total matches worth a single point each. Although the number and type of matches played was the same as in previous events, the schedule was slightly altered. Six foursome matches were played on the first day and six four-ball matches were played on the second. On the third day, five four-ball matches were played in the morning and five foursome matches were played in the afternoon. The competition concluded with twelve singles matches on the final day. Because of the unresolved outcome in the previous President's Cup, an additional change was made to the structure. Under the new format, the singles matches would go to extra holes if at the conclusion of the 18 hole round the match was all-square and the Cup had not been decided.

== Teams ==
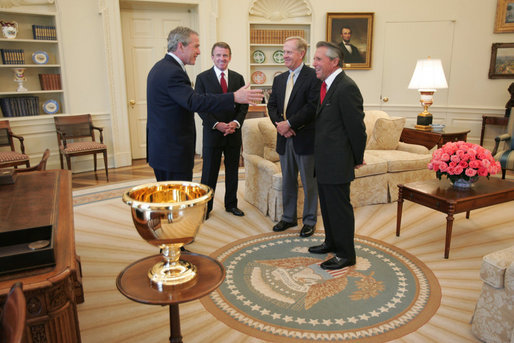

Ernie Els, who was the second ranked player in the International team, did not play because of a knee injury.

United States team
Player	Age	Points rank	OWGR	Previous appearances	Matches	W–L–H	Winning percentage
Jack Nicklaus	65	Non-playing captain					
Jeff Sluman	48	Non-playing assistant captain					
Tiger Woods	29	1	1	3	15	8–7–0	53.33
Phil Mickelson	35	2	3	5	23	6–12–5	36.96
David Toms	38	3	13	1	5	1–4–0	20.00
Kenny Perry	45	4	10	2	9	6–3–0	66.67
Chris DiMarco	37	5	8	1	5	2–3–0	40.00
Jim Furyk	35	6	9	3	13	7–6–0	53.85
Fred Funk	49	7	33	1	4	1–2–1	37.50
Stewart Cink	32	8	22	1	4	4–0–0	100.00
Davis Love III	41	9	16	5	23	14–6–3	67.39
Scott Verplank	41	10	25	0	Rookie		
Justin Leonard	33	11	24	3	13	3–9–1	26.92
Fred Couples	45	17	20	3	12	8–3–1	70.83

International team
Player	Country	Age	Points rank	OWGR	Previous appearances	Matches	W–L–H	Winning percentage
Gary Player	South Africa	69	Non-playing captain					
Ian Baker-Finch	Australia	44	Non-playing assistant captain					
Vijay Singh	Fiji	42	1	2	5	25	12–11–2	52.00
Retief Goosen	South Africa	36	3	5	2	10	5–5–0	50.00
Adam Scott	Australia	25	4	7	1	5	3–2–0	60.00
Ángel Cabrera	Argentina	36	5	11	0	Rookie		
Tim Clark	South Africa	29	6	18	1	5	2–3–0	40.00
Michael Campbell	New Zealand	36	7	15	1	4	1–2–1	37.50
Stuart Appleby	Australia	34	8	26	3	11	3–7–1	31.82
Mike Weir	Canada	35	9	32	2	10	6–4–0	60.00
Nick O'Hern	Australia	33	10	30	0	Rookie		
Mark Hensby	Australia	34	11	27	0	Rookie		
Peter Lonard	Australia	38	12	38	1	4	2–2–0	50.00
Trevor Immelman	South Africa	25	22	55	0	Rookie		

- OWGR as of September 18, 2005, the last ranking before the Cup

== Thursday's matches ==
All matches played were foursomes.

International	Results	United States
Scott/Goosen	4 & 3	Woods/Couples
Singh/Hensby	halved	Funk/Furyk
O'Hern/Clark	1 up	Mickelson/DiMarco
Lonard/Appleby	4 & 2	Leonard/Verplank
Campbell/Cabrera	2 & 1	Love/Perry
Immelman/Weir	6 & 5	Cink/Toms
3 1/2	Foursomes	2 1/2
3 1/2	Overall	2 1/2

== Friday's matches ==
All matches played were four-ball.

International	Results	United States
Campbell/Cabrera	halved	Mickelson/DiMarco
Scott/Goosen	3 & 1	Couples/Toms
Immelman/Weir	2 & 1	Leonard/Verplank
Singh/Clark	halved	Funk/Cink
Lonard/O'Hern	3 & 2	Love/Perry
Appleby/Hensby	3 & 2	Woods/Furyk
3	Four-Ball	3
6 1/2	Overall	5 1/2

== Saturday's matches ==
=== Morning foursomes ===
International	Results	United States
Goosen/Scott	halved	Leonard/Verplank
Campbell/Cabrera	5 & 3	Mickelson/DiMarco
Singh/Appleby	halved	Woods/Furyk
Clark/O'Hern	2 & 1	Funk/Toms
Immelman/Weir	1 up	Love/Cink
2	Foursomes	3
8 1/2	Overall	8 1/2

=== Afternoon four-ball ===
International	Results	United States
Goosen/Scott	5 & 4	Leonard/Verplank
Lonard/O'Hern	6 & 5	Mickelson/DiMarco
Campbell/Cabrera	halved	Love/Couples
Hensby/Clark	5 & 3	Perry/Cink
Singh/Appleby	2 up	Woods/Furyk
2 1/2	Four-Ball	2 1/2
11	Overall	11

== Sunday's matches ==
=== Singles ===
International	Results	United States
Clark	4 & 3	Leonard
Immelman	2 & 1	Toms
Goosen	2 & 1	Woods
Hensby	4 & 3	Perry
Singh	1 up	Couples
Weir	3 & 2	Verplank
Scott	3 & 2	Furyk
Lonard	3 & 2	Cink
Campbell	3 & 2	Funk
O'Hern	4 & 3	Love
Cabrera	halved	Mickelson
Appleby	1 up	DiMarco
4 1/2	Singles	7 1/2
15 1/2	Overall	18 1/2

== Individual player records ==
Each entry refers to the win–loss–half record of the player.

=== United States ===
Player	Points	Overall	Singles	Foursomes	Fourballs
Stewart Cink	1.5	1–3–1	0–1–0	1–1–0	0–1–1
Fred Couples	1.5	1–2–1	1–0–0	0–1–0	0–1–1
Chris DiMarco	4.5	4–0–1	1–0–0	2–0–0	1–0–1
Fred Funk	1	0–2–2	0–1–0	0–1–1	0–0–1
Jim Furyk	4	3–0–2	1–0–0	0–0–2	2–0–0
Justin Leonard	3.5	3–1–1	1–0–0	1–0–1	1–1–0
Davis Love III	2.5	2–2–1	1–0–0	1–1–0	0–1–1
Phil Mickelson	4	3–0–2	0–0–1	2–0–0	1–0–1
Kenny Perry	1	1–3–0	1–0–0	0–1–0	0–2–0
David Toms	1	1–3–0	1–0–0	0–2–0	0–1–0
Scott Verplank	2.5	2–2–1	0–1–0	1–0–1	1–1–0
Tiger Woods	2.5	2–2–1	0–1–0	0–1–1	2–0–0

=== International ===
Player	Points	Overall	Singles	Foursomes	Fourballs
Stuart Appleby	0.5	0–4–1	0–1–0	0–1–1	0–2–0
Ángel Cabrera	2.5	1–1–3	0–0–1	1–1–0	0–0–2
Michael Campbell	3	2–1–2	1–0–0	1–1–0	0–0–2
Tim Clark	2.5	2–2–1	0–1–0	1–1–0	1–0–1
Retief Goosen	4.5	4–0–1	1–0–0	1–0–1	2–0–0
Mark Hensby	1.5	1–2–1	0–1–0	0–0–1	1–1–0
Trevor Immelman	1	1–3–0	0–1–0	1–1–0	0–1–0
Peter Lonard	2	2–2–0	1–0–0	0–1–0	1–1–0
Nick O'Hern	2	2–3–0	0–1–0	1–1–0	1–1–0
Adam Scott	3.5	3–1–1	0–1–0	1–0–1	2–0–0
Vijay Singh	1.5	0–2–3	0–1–0	0–0–2	0–1–1
Mike Weir	2	2–2–0	1–0–0	1–1–0	0–1–0
