= Liberty National Golf Club =

Country club in New Jersey, United States

Liberty National
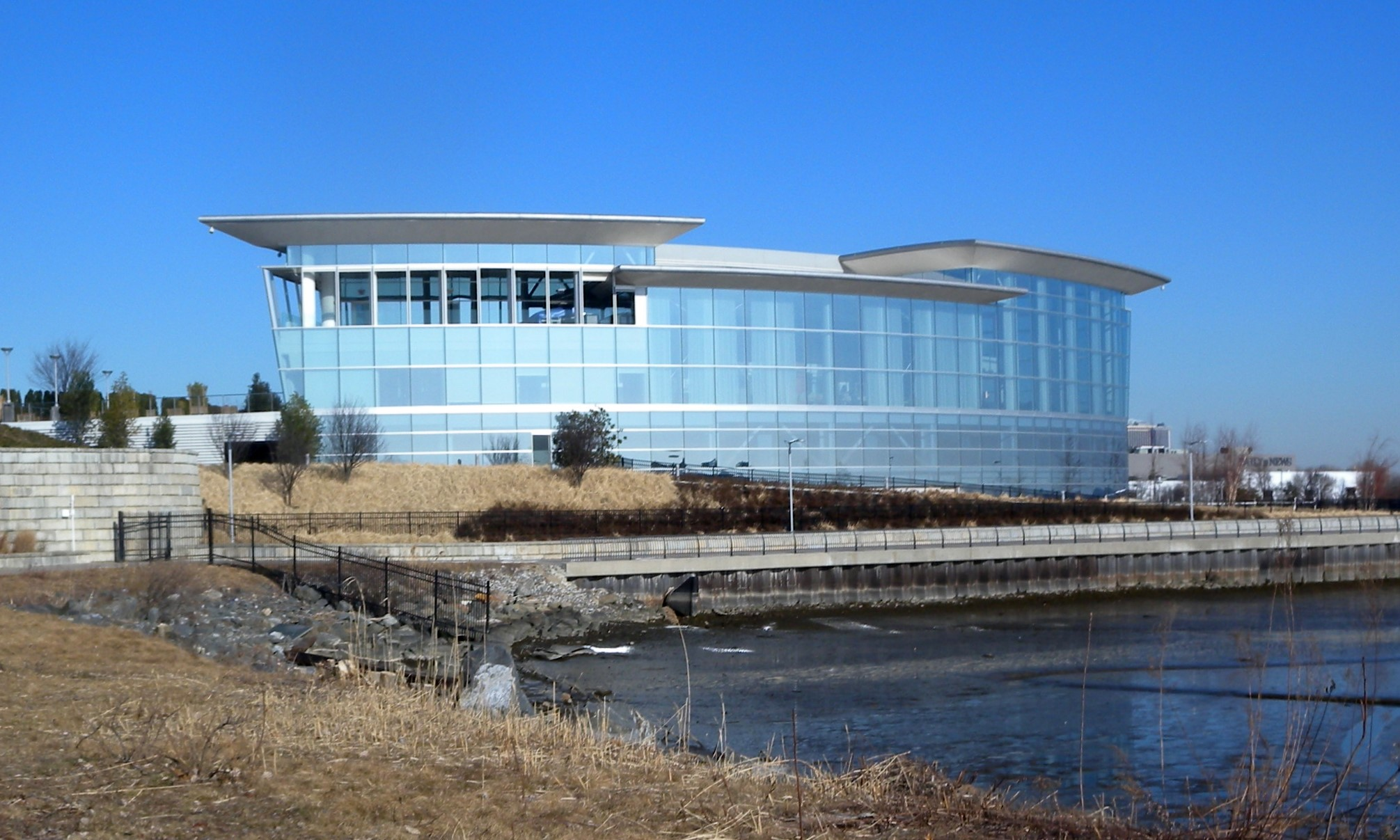
- Clubhouse in February 2012

- Location in the United States Liberty National Golf Club (New Jersey)
- 40.697°N 74.068°W

Club information
- Location: Jersey City, New Jersey
- Established: 2006
- Type: Private non-equity
- Owner: Paul Fireman
- Total holes: 18
- Tournaments: The Northern Trust (2009, 2013, 2019, 2021); Mizuho Americas Open (2023, 2024); The Presidents Cup (2017)
- Greens: Bentgrass - A4
- Fairways: Bentgrass - L93
- Website: libertynationalgc.com
- Designed by: Lindsay Newman; Architecture & Design, Robert Cupp & Tom Kite
- Par: 72
- Length: 7,387 yards (6,755 m)
- Course rating: 77.7
- Slope rating: 155
- Course record: 60 Cameron Smith (2021)

Liberty National is a country club located in Jersey City, New Jersey adjacent to Liberty State Park on the Upper New York Bay. Its clubhouse, guest villas, teaching center, and "Cafe 12" halfway house were designed by Lindsay Newman Architecture and Design, while the golf course was designed by Robert E. Cupp and Tom Kite.

Construction cost more than $250 million, making it among the most expensive golf courses in history. The club features amenities such as an on-site helistop, direct ferry service to and from Manhattan, a spa, and a restaurant.

== Tournaments hosted ==
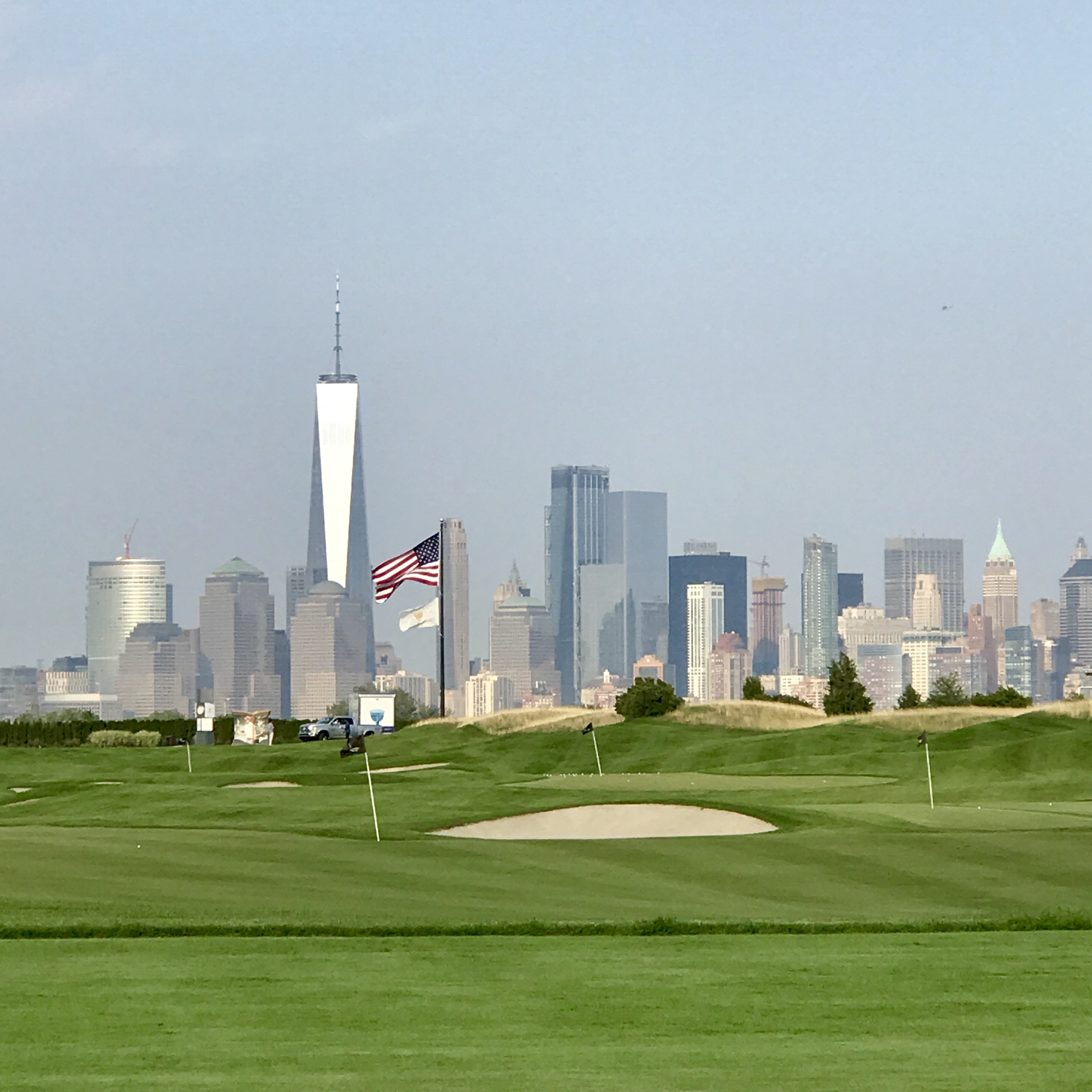
Practice Range

Liberty National hosted The Northern Trust (formerly known as The Barclays and the Westchester Classic) on several occasions, including in 2009, 2013, 2019, and 2021.

In 2009, Heath Slocum won with a score of 275 (–9), one stroke ahead of four runners-up. In August 2013, Australian Adam Scott won by one stroke over four runners-up. Due to negative feedback from many players in 2009, the course underwent numerous modifications leading to a more favorable reception in 2013.

In 2019, The Northern Trust – the first of three events of the PGA TOUR's FedEx Cup Playoffs – was held at Liberty National from August 8–11. Patrick Reed emerged as the winner, with a score of 268 (–16). In 2021, the tournament again served as the opening event of the FedEx Cup Playoffs, with Tony Finau claiming victory with a score of 264 (–20).

From June 1-4, 2023, Liberty National hosted its first LPGA event, the Mizuho Americas Open, overlooking the Statue of Liberty and the Manhattan skyline. Former amateur golfer Rose Zhang won the tournament in her professional debut on her final round in a sudden-death playoff with Jennifer Kupcho.

From May 16-19, 2024, the course hosted the Mizuho Americas Open with Nelly Korda winning the tournament by one stroke.

From May 8–11 2025, the Mizuho Americas Open was held with Atthaya Thitikul shooting 3-under 69 for a four-shot victory over Celine Boutier.

=== Presidents Cup ===
From September 28 to October 1, 2017, Liberty National hosted the Presidents Cup where the United States team, led by captain Steve Stricker, defeated the International team by a score of 19–11 for their seventh straight victory.

== Caven Point controversy ==
Caven Point is a 22-acre (8.9 ha) bird sanctuary in Liberty State Park along the Hudson River Waterfront Walkway, adjacent to the Liberty National golf course. The owners of the course have expressed interest in leasing the land to expand the course with additional holes. The proposal would require privatization of publicly-owned land and disruption of the fragile ecosystem. In response, proposals to protect the land have been made in the New Jersey Legislature to specifically protect the park from commercial development without a severe vetting process and public scrutiny.

== Scorecard ==
Liberty National Golf Club
| Tee | Rating/Slope | 1 | 2 | 3 | 4 | 5 | 6 | 7 | 8 | 9 | Out | 10 | 11 | 12 | 13 | 14 | 15 | 16 | 17 | 18 | In | Total |
| Tournament | 77.7 / 155 | 398 | 219 | 395 | 193 | 427 | 538 | 484 | 611 | 474 | 3739 | 513 | 250 | 431 | 563 | 150 | 481 | 325 | 445 | 490 | 3648 | 7387 |
| Medal | 74.2 / 142 | 365 | 196 | 365 | 163 | 401 | 523 | 445 | 565 | 360 | 3383 | 496 | 225 | 363 | 521 | 146 | 444 | 285 | 428 | 471 | 3379 | 6762 |
| Liberty | 72.9 / 141 | 365 | 171 | 365 | 153 | 401 | 498 | 413 | 537 | 360 | 3263 | 496 | 193 | 363 | 489 | 146 | 423 | 285 | 428 | 414 | 3237 | 6500 |
| Member | 72.2 / 134 | 339 | 171 | 345 | 153 | 386 | 498 | 413 | 537 | 347 | 3189 | 453 | 193 | 324 | 489 | 131 | 423 | 261 | 387 | 414 | 3075 | 6264 |
| Regular | 69.6 / 120 | 319 | 142 | 322 | 136 | 344 | 465 | 381 | 485 | 330 | 2924 | 424 | 153 | 301 | 446 | 114 | 401 | 248 | 348 | 389 | 2824 | 5748 |
| SI | | 15 | 17 | 11 | 13 | 5 | 9 | 3 | 1 | 7 | | 12 | 8 | 14 | 10 | 18 | 4 | 16 | 6 | 2 |
| Par | | 4 | 3 | 4 | 3 | 4 | 5 | 4 | 5 | 4 | 36 | 5 | 3 | 4 | 5 | 3 | 4 | 4 | 4 | 4 | 36 | 72 |
| Forward | 72.4 / 135 | 293 | 137 | 277 | 107 | 304 | 438 | 353 | 453 | 269 | 2631 | 374 | 113 | 262 | 414 | 98 | 366 | 224 | 297 | 325 | 2473 | 5104 |

== Notable members ==
Liberty National has notable members such as:

- Cristie Kerr
- Robert Kraft
- Eli Manning
- Phil Mickelson
- Justin Timberlake
- Mark Wahlberg
- Matt Harvey
