= Bruce Vaughan =

American professional golfer (born 1956)

Personal information
- Full name: Bruce Lloyd Vaughan
- Nationality: United States
- Born: September 10, 1956 (age 70) Kankakee, Illinois, U.S.
- Height: 6 ft 3 in (1.91 m)
- Weight: 205 lb (93 kg; 14.6 st)

Career
- Sport: Golf
- Turned professional: 1990
- Current tour: Champions Tour
- Former tours: PGA Tour; Sunshine Tour; Pro Golf Tour
- Professional wins: 6

Number of wins by tour
- Sunshine Tour: 1
- Korn Ferry Tour: 2
- PGA Tour Champions: 1
- Other: 2

Best results in major championships
- Masters Tournament: DNP
- PGA Championship: DNP
- U.S. Open: CUT: 1990, 1993, 1995
- The Open Championship: CUT: 1994, 2006, 2009

Bruce Lloyd Vaughan (born September 10, 1956) is an American professional golfer.

== Early life ==
Vaughan was born in Kankakee, Illinois. He didn't start playing golf until he was 20 while working as a firefighter in Hutchinson, Kansas.

== Professional career ==
In 1990, Vaughan turned professional. Early in his career, he played on the Southern African Tour. He had much success during the 1993–94 season. Vaughn finished joint second at the ICL International with David Frost, only behind Nick Price. Later in the year he won the Autopage Mount Edgecombe Trophy. He finished second during the season's Order of Merit.

Vaughn also played on the PGA Tour's developmental tour early in his career. He played on the Nike Tour from 1992 to 1994, winning twice in 1994. He finished sixth on the money list in 1994 earning him his PGA Tour card for 1995. He struggled on the PGA Tour in 1995, making only 15 cuts in 30 events. He finished 173rd on the money list and lost his card. He re-joined the Nike Tour and played on the tour from 1996 to 1998.

After turning 50, Vaughan qualified for the 2007 Champions Tour by finishing T3 in the qualifying school. He won his first Champions Tour event in 2008 at the Senior British Open, a senior major.

== Personal life ==
Vaughan resides in Hutchinson, Kansas.

== Professional wins (6) ==
=== Southern Africa Tour wins (1) ===
No.	Date	Tournament	Winning score	Margin of victory	Runner-up
1	Feb 13, 1994	Autopage Mount Edgecombe Trophy	−13 (72-70-70-63=275)	Playoff	(Zimbabwe) Tony Johnstone

Southern Africa Tour playoff record (1–0)

No.	Year	Tournament	Opponent	Result
1	1994	Autopage Mount Edgecombe Trophy	(Zimbabwe) Tony Johnstone	Won with par on second extra hole

=== Nike Tour wins (2) ===
No.	Date	Tournament	Winning score	Margin of victory	Runner(s)-up
1	Apr 3, 1994	Nike Pensacola Classic	−13 (68-66-66-71=271)	1 stroke	(United States) Ron Philo
2	Aug 28, 1994	Nike Permian Basin Open	−19 (68-67-67-67=269)	4 strokes	(United States) Gary Rusnak, (United States) Bob Wolcott

=== Pro Golf Tour wins (2) ===
No.	Date	Tournament	Winning score	Margin of victory	Runner(s)-up
1	Apr 24, 1988	Texas Riviera Invitational	−7 (70-71-67-73=281)	2 strokes	(United States) Ray Barr, (United States) Roger Salazar, (United States) Jim Woodward
2	Jul 24, 1988	West Texas Classic	−17 (67-61-68-70=266)	1 stroke	(United States) Jim Woodward

=== Champions Tour wins (1) ===
Legend
Senior major championships (1)
Other Champions Tour (0)

No.	Date	Tournament	Winning score	Margin of victory	Runner-up
1	Jul 27, 2008	The Senior Open Championship	−6 (68-71-69-70=278)	Playoff	(United States) John Cook

Champions Tour playoff record (1–0)

No.	Year	Tournament	Opponent	Result
1	2008	The Senior Open Championship	(United States) John Cook	Won with birdie on first extra hole

== Results in major championships ==
Tournament	1990	1991	1992	1993	1994	1995	1996	1997	1998	1999
U.S. Open	CUT			CUT		CUT				
The Open Championship					CUT					

Tournament	2000	2001	2002	2003	2004	2005	2006	2007	2008	2009
U.S. Open										
The Open Championship							CUT			CUT

Did not play

CUT = missed the halfway cut
"T" indicates a tie for a place
Note: Vaughan never played in the Masters Tournament or the PGA Championship.

== Senior major championships ==
=== Wins (1) ===
Year	Championship	Winning score	Margin	Runner-up
2008	Senior British Open Championship	−6 (68-71-69-70=278)	Playoff	(United States) John Cook

=== Senior results timeline ===
Results not in chronological order before 2017.

Tournament	2007	2008	2009	2010	2011	2012	2013	2014	2015	2016	2017	2018
The Tradition	T56	T41	T31	45	T25	T38	T31					
Senior PGA Championship	T24	T30	CUT	T50	T50	T61	T42					
U.S. Senior Open	T16		T16	T53	CUT	CUT	CUT	T55				
Senior Players Championship	T17	76	T34	T38	T32	T14	T27	T54				
Senior British Open Championship	T34	1	T8	T20	CUT	CUT	T55	T13				CUT

Win
Top 10
Did not play

CUT = missed the halfway cut
"T" indicates a tie for a place

== See also ==
- 1994 Nike Tour graduates
