= 2000 Presidents Cup =

Golf match in Virginia, US

- Dates: October 19–22, 2000
- Venue: Robert Trent Jones Golf Club
- Location: Gainesville, Virginia, U.S.
- Captains: Ken Venturi (USA); Peter Thomson (International)
USA	21 1/2	10 1/2	International
- United States wins the Presidents Cup

Location map
- Location within the United States Location within Virginia

The 2000 Presidents Cup was held between October 19 and 22, 2000. It was played at the Robert Trent Jones Golf Club in Gainesville, Virginia, U.S. The United States team won the competition by a margin of 21 1/2–10 1/2. The honorary chairman was American President Bill Clinton.

== Format ==
Both teams had 12 players plus a non-playing captain. The competition was four days long unlike the past three tournaments where there were three days of competition. The same number of matches were still played though. On the first day foursomes were played. On the second day four-ball and foursomes was played. On the third day four-ball was played. On the fourth and final day singles were played.

== Teams ==
United States team
Player	Age	Points rank	OWGR	Previous appearances	Matches	W–L–H	Winning percentage
Ken Venturi	69	Non-playing captain					
Paul Marchand	42	Non-playing assistant captain					
Tiger Woods	24	1	1	1	5	2–3–0	40.00
Phil Mickelson	30	2	5	3	13	3–5–5	42.31
Hal Sutton	42	3	8	0	Rookie		
David Duval	28	4	3	2	9	4–4–1	50.00
Davis Love III	36	5	7	3	15	8–5–2	60.00
Tom Lehman	41	6	12	2	10	3–6–1	35.00
Jim Furyk	30	7	13	1	4	1–3–0	25.00
Notah Begay III	28	8	32	0	Rookie		
Kirk Triplett	38	9	28	0	Rookie		
Stewart Cink	27	10	19	0	Rookie		
Loren Roberts	45	11	23	1	4	2–1–1	62.50
Paul Azinger	40	24	31	0	Rookie		

International team
Player	Country	Age	Points rank	OWGR	Previous appearances	Matches	W–L–H	Winning percentage
Peter Thomson	Australia	71	Non-playing captain					
Wayne Grady	Australia	43	Non-playing assistant captain					
Ernie Els	South Africa	31	1	2	2	10	6–2–2	70.00
Vijay Singh	Fiji	37	2	9	3	15	8–5–2	60.00
Nick Price	Zimbabwe	43	3	14	3	14	4–6–4	42.86
Carlos Franco	Paraguay	35	4	24	1	3	0–2–1	16.67
Stuart Appleby	Australia	29	5	33	1	4	2–1–1	62.50
Michael Campbell	New Zealand	31	6	18	0	Rookie		
Mike Weir	Canada	30	7	36	0	Rookie		
Shigeki Maruyama	Japan	31	8	42	1	5	5–0–0	100.00
Greg Norman	Australia	45	9	41	2	10	6–3–1	65.00
Retief Goosen	South Africa	31	10	34	0	Rookie		
Robert Allenby	Australia	29	11	43	2	10	3–7–0	30.00
Steve Elkington	Australia	37	17	92	3	15	8–4–3	63.33

- OWGR as of October 15, 2000, the last ranking before the Cup

== Thursday's matches ==
All matches played were foursomes.

International	Results	United States
Elkington/Norman	5 & 4	Mickelson/Lehman
Allenby/Appleby	1 up	Sutton/Furyk
Weir/Goosen	3 & 2	Cink/Triplett
Singh/Els	1 up	Woods/Begay
Price/Franco	1 up	Duval/Love
0	Foursomes	5
0	Overall	5

== Friday's matches ==
=== Morning four-ball ===
International	Results	United States
Campbell/Goosen	4 & 3	Sutton/Azinger
Weir/Elkington	3 & 2	Lehman/Roberts
Price/Norman	6 & 5	Furyk/Duval
Maruyama/Franco	3 & 2	Woods/Begay
Singh/Els	2 & 1	Mickelson/Love
4	Four-Ball	1
4	Overall	6

=== Afternoon foursomes ===
International	Results	United States
Allenby/Appleby	2 & 1	Cink/Triplett
Franco/Maruyama	5 & 4	Roberts/Azinger
Singh/Els	6 & 5	Woods/Begay
Campbell/Goosen	4 & 2	Sutton/Lehman
Price/Weir	6 & 4	Mickelson/Duval
1	Foursomes	4
5	Overall	10

== Saturday's matches ==
All matches played were four-ball.

International	Results	United States
Campbell/Norman	6 & 5	Sutton/Furyk
Weir/Elkington	2 & 1	Lehman/Mickelson
Price/Els	3 & 2	Love/Duval
Allenby/Franco	1 up	Triplett/Cink
Singh/Goosen	2 & 1	Woods/Begay
1	Four-Ball	4
6	Overall	14

== Sunday's matches ==
=== Singles ===
International	Results	United States
Allenby	2 & 1	Azinger
Price	2 & 1	Duval
Appleby	3 & 2	Roberts
Weir	4 & 3	Mickelson
Els	4 & 3	Love
Elkington	1 up	Lehman
Singh	2 & 1	Woods
Norman	2 & 1	Cink
Franco	6 & 5	Sutton
Maruyama	5 & 4	Furyk
Campbell	halved	Triplett
Goosen	1 up	Begay
4 1/2	Singles	7 1/2
10 1/2	Overall	21 1/2

== Individual player records ==
Each entry refers to the win–loss–half record of the player.

=== United States ===
Player	Points	Overall	Singles	Foursomes	Fourballs
Paul Azinger	1	1–2–0	0–1–0	1–0–0	0–1–0
Notah Begay III	3	3–2–0	1–0–0	2–0–0	0–2–0
Stewart Cink	4	4–0–0	1–0–0	2–0–0	1–0–0
David Duval	3	3–2–0	1–0–0	1–1–0	1–1–0
Jim Furyk	3	3–1–0	1–0–0	1–0–0	1–1–0
Tom Lehman	3	3–2–0	0–1–0	2–0–0	1–1–0
Davis Love III	4	4–0–0	1–0–0	1–0–0	2–0–0
Phil Mickelson	3	3–2–0	0–1–0	1–1–0	2–0–0
Loren Roberts	2	2–1–0	1–0–0	1–0–0	0–1–0
Hal Sutton	3	3–2–0	0–1–0	2–0–0	1–1–0
Kirk Triplett	3.5	3–0–1	0–0–1	2–0–0	1–0–0
Tiger Woods	3	3–2–0	1–0–0	2–0–0	0–2–0

=== International ===
Player	Points	Overall	Singles	Foursomes	Fourballs
Robert Allenby	1	1–3–0	1–0–0	0–2–0	0–1–0
Stuart Appleby	0	0–3–0	0–1–0	0–2–0	0–0–0
Michael Campbell	1.5	1–2–1	0–0–1	0–1–0	1–1–0
Steve Elkington	2	2–2–0	1–0–0	0–1–0	1–1–0
Ernie Els	0	0–5–0	0–1–0	0–2–0	0–2–0
Carlos Franco	2	2–3–0	1–0–0	0–2–0	1–1–0
Retief Goosen	2	2–3–0	0–1–0	0–2–0	2–0–0
Shigeki Maruyama	1	1–2–0	0–1–0	0–1–0	1–0–0
Greg Norman	1	1–3–0	0–1–0	0–1–0	1–1–0
Nick Price	2	2–3–0	0–1–0	1–1–0	1–1–0
Vijay Singh	1	1–4–0	0–1–0	0–2–0	1–1–0
Mike Weir	3	3–2–0	1–0–0	1–1–0	1–1–0
