= Presidents Cup =

Golf tournament between the United States and an international team

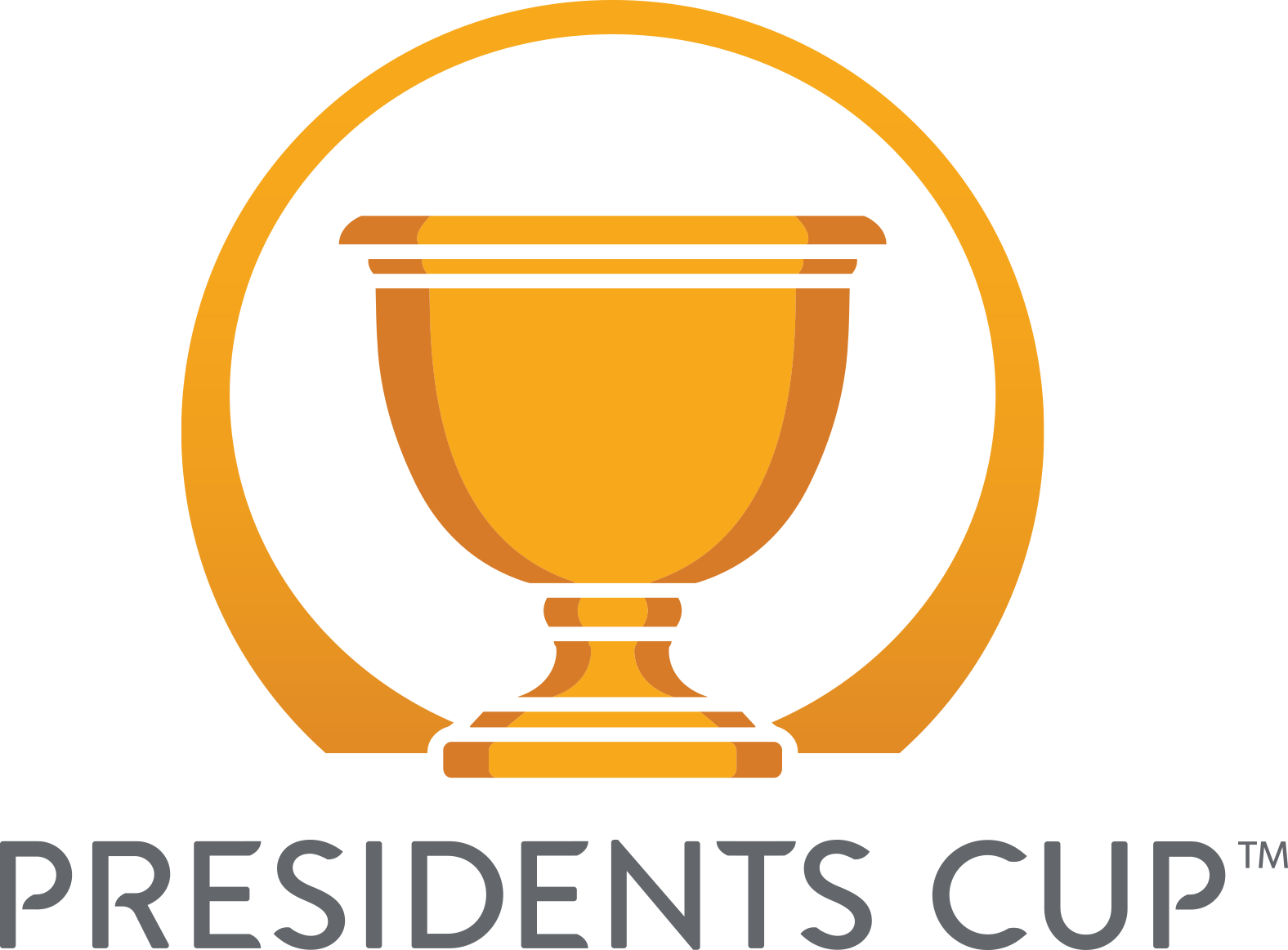

Tournament information
- Location: 2026: Medinah, Illinois
- Established: 1994
- Course: 2026: Medinah Country Club
- Tour: PGA Tour
- Format: Match play
- Month played: September
- Website: presidentscup.com

Current champion
- United States

Current tournament
- 2026 Presidents Cup

The Presidents Cup is a series of men's golf matches between a team representing the United States and an International Team representing the rest of the world except Europe as that continent competes against the United States in a similar but considerably older event, the Ryder Cup.

The Presidents Cup has been held biennially since 1994. Initially it was held in even-numbered years, with the Ryder Cup being held in odd numbered years. However, the cancellation of the 2001 Ryder Cup due to the September 11 attacks pushed both tournaments back a year, and the Presidents Cup was then held in odd-numbered years. It reverted to even-number years following the postponement of the 2020 Ryder Cup due to the COVID-19 pandemic. It is hosted alternately in the United States and countries represented by the International Team.

Since 2018, the International team has competed under a specifically designed logo and flag, designed by Ernie Els and artist Jeff Costa, based on the shield-shaped patches worn by military units. In previous competitions various symbols were used; in 2016 a light-blue flag with five gold stars, one for each continent that can supply players, but this was judged to be too similar to the Flag of Europe.

The next Presidents Cup will be held September 2028, at Kingston Heath Golf Club, Cheltenham, Victoria, Australia.

== Format ==
The scoring system of the event is match play. The format is drawn from the Ryder Cup and consists of 12 players per side. Each team has a captain, usually a highly respected golf figure, who is responsible for choosing the pairs in the doubles events, which consist of both alternate shot and best ball formats (also known as "foursomes" and "fourball" matches respectively). Each match, whether it be a doubles or singles match, is worth one point with a half-point awarded to each team in the event of a halved match.

There have been frequent small changes to the format, although the final day has always consisted of 12 singles matches. The contest was extended from three days to four in 2000. In 2015, there were nine foursome doubles matches, nine fourball doubles matches, and 12 singles matches. With a total of 30 points, a team needed to get 15.5 points to win the Cup.

Year	Day 1		Day 2		Day 3		Day 4	Total Points
Year	Morning	Afternoon	Morning	Afternoon	Morning	Afternoon	Day 4	Total Points
1994, 1996	5 fourballs	5 foursomes	5 fourballs	5 foursomes	12 singles		–	32
1998	5 foursomes	5 fourballs	5 foursomes	5 fourballs	12 singles		–	32
2000	5 foursomes		5 fourballs	5 foursomes	5 fourballs		12 singles	32
2003	6 foursomes		5 fourballs	5 foursomes	6 fourballs		12 singles	34
2005–2011	6 foursomes		6 fourballs		5 foursomes	5 fourballs	12 singles	34
2013	6 fourballs		6 foursomes		5 fourballs	5 foursomes	12 singles	34
2015, 2017	5 foursomes		5 fourballs		4 foursomes	4 fourballs	12 singles	30
2019	5 fourballs		5 foursomes		4 fourballs	4 foursomes	12 singles	30
2022	5 foursomes		5 fourballs		4 foursomes	4 fourballs	12 singles	30
2024, 2026	5 fourballs		5 foursomes		4 fourballs	4 foursomes	12 singles	30

=== Ties ===
Until the 2005 event, prior to the start of the final day matches, the captains selected one player to play in a tie-breaker in the event of a tie at the end of the final match. Upon a tie, the captains would reveal the players who would play a sudden-death match to determine the winner. In 2003, however, the tiebreaker match ended after three holes because of darkness, and the captains, Gary Player and Jack Nicklaus, agreed that the Cup would be shared by both teams.

From 2005 to 2013, singles matches ending level at the end of the regulation 18 holes were to be extended to extra holes until the match was won outright. All singles matches would continue in this format until one team reaches the required point total to win the Presidents Cup. Remaining singles matches were only to be played to the regulation 18 holes and could be halved. Although this rule was in force for five Presidents Cup contests, no matches actually went beyond 18 holes.

== History ==
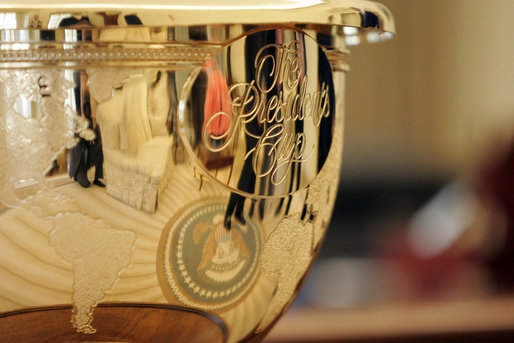
Presidents Cup

The event was created and is organized by the PGA Tour.

Each contest has an Honorary Chairman or Chairwoman, the head of state or head of government of the host nation.

Year	Chairman or Chairwoman	Title
1994	(United States) Gerald Ford	38th President of the United States
1996	(United States) George H. W. Bush	41st President of the United States
1998	(Australia) John Howard	25th Prime Minister of Australia
2000	(United States) Bill Clinton	42nd President of the United States
2003	(South Africa) Thabo Mbeki	2nd President of South Africa
2005	(United States) George W. Bush	43rd President of the United States
2007	(Canada) Stephen Harper	22nd Prime Minister of Canada
2009	(United States) Barack Obama	44th President of the United States
2011	(Australia) Julia Gillard	27th Prime Minister of Australia
2013	(United States) Barack Obama (2)	44th President of the United States
2015	(South Korea) Park Geun-hye	11th President of South Korea
2017	(United States) Donald Trump	45th President of the United States
2019	(Australia) Scott Morrison	30th Prime Minister of Australia
2022	(United States) Joe Biden	46th President of the United States
2024	(Canada) Justin Trudeau	23rd Prime Minister of Canada
2026	(United States) Donald Trump (2)	47th President of the United States

== Charity ==
There is no prize money awarded at the Presidents Cup. The net proceeds are distributed to charities nominated by the players, captains, and captains' assistants. The first ten Presidents Cups raised over US$32 million for charities around the world.

== Results ==
Year	Venue	Location	Winning team	Score	U.S. captain	International captain
2026	Medinah Country Club	Medinah, Illinois, United States	United States	17–13	Brandt Snedeker	(Australia) Geoff Ogilvy
2024	Royal Montreal Golf Club (2)	Montreal, Quebec, Canada	United States	18 1/2–11 1/2	Jim Furyk	(Canada) Mike Weir
2022	Quail Hollow Club	Charlotte, North Carolina, United States	United States	17 1/2–12 1/2	Davis Love III	(South Africa) Trevor Immelman
2019	Royal Melbourne Golf Club (3)	Melbourne, Victoria, Australia	United States	16–14	Tiger Woods	(South Africa) Ernie Els
2017	Liberty National Golf Club	Jersey City, New Jersey, United States	United States	19–11	Steve Stricker	(Zimbabwe) Nick Price (3)
2015	Jack Nicklaus Golf Club Korea	Incheon, South Korea	United States	15 1/2–14 1/2	Jay Haas	(Zimbabwe) Nick Price (2)
2013	Muirfield Village	Dublin, Ohio, United States	United States	18 1/2–15 1/2	Fred Couples (3)	(Zimbabwe) Nick Price
2011	Royal Melbourne Golf Club (2)	Melbourne, Victoria, Australia	United States	19–15	Fred Couples (2)	(Australia) Greg Norman (2)
2009	Harding Park Golf Club	San Francisco, California, United States	United States	19 1/2–14 1/2	Fred Couples	(Australia) Greg Norman
2007	Royal Montreal Golf Club	Montreal, Quebec, Canada	United States	19 1/2–14 1/2	Jack Nicklaus (4)	(South Africa) Gary Player (3)
2005	Robert Trent Jones Golf Club (4)	Gainesville, Virginia, United States	United States	18 1/2–15 1/2	Jack Nicklaus (3)	(South Africa) Gary Player (2)
2003	Fancourt Hotel and Country Club	George, Western Cape, South Africa	Tied	17–17	Jack Nicklaus (2)	(South Africa) Gary Player
2000	Robert Trent Jones Golf Club (3)	Gainesville, Virginia, United States	United States	21 1/2–10 1/2	Ken Venturi	(Australia) Peter Thomson (3)
1998	Royal Melbourne Golf Club	Melbourne, Victoria, Australia	International Team	20 1/2–11 1/2	Jack Nicklaus	(Australia) Peter Thomson (2)
1996	Robert Trent Jones Golf Club (2)	Gainesville, Virginia, United States	United States	16 1/2–15 1/2	Arnold Palmer	(Australia) Peter Thomson
1994	Robert Trent Jones Golf Club	Gainesville, Virginia, United States	United States	20–12	Hale Irwin	(Australia) David Graham

== Champions by team ==
Nationality	Wins
United States	14
International Team	1
Shared	1

== Future venues ==
- 2028 Kingston Heath Golf Club, Cheltenham, Victoria, Australia
- 2030 Bellerive Country Club, Town and Country, Missouri, United States

== Records ==
- Most appearances on a team: 12
  ° Phil Mickelson (USA), 1994–2017
  ° Adam Scott (AUS), 2003–2026
- Most points: 32 1/2
  ° Phil Mickelson (USA) (26–16–13 record)
- Most singles points won: 7
  ° Tiger Woods (USA) (7–2–0 record)
- Most foursomes points won: 14
  ° Phil Mickelson (USA) (12–6–4 record)
- Most fourball points won: 13
  ° Phil Mickelson (USA) (10–5–6 record)
- Most points in a single contest: 5
  ° Mark O'Meara (USA) 1996
  ° Shigeki Maruyama (Int) 1998
  ° Tiger Woods (USA) 2009
  ° Jim Furyk (USA) 2011
  ° Branden Grace (Int) 2015
  ° Jordan Spieth (USA) 2022
- Youngest player: 18 years, 21 days
  ° Ryo Ishikawa (Int) 2009
- Oldest player: 49 years, 353 days
  ° Jay Haas (USA) 2003

== See also ==
- List of American Presidents Cup golfers
- List of International Presidents Cup golfers
- Junior Presidents Cup
