= Algonquin Golf Club =

Private country club in Missouri, U.S.

Coordinates: 38°35′15″N 90°22′36″W

Algonquin Golf Club was founded in the Webster Park neighborhood of Webster Groves, Missouri in 1899, and is one of the St. Louis area’s oldest private country clubs, along with St. Louis Country Club, Bellerive Country Club, Westwood Country Club and Old Warson Country Club.

== History ==
Subsequent to its 1899 founding in Webster Park, Algonquin moved to its current location in Glendale, Missouri in 1903. The current course was designed by architect Tom Bendelow and was constructed by Robert Foulis in 1904. At this time it had nine holes and an additional nine holes were added in 1914. Out of the nine holes built in 1903, seven still remain with substantially the same routing. Algonquin has the distinction of being one of the few clubs west of the Mississippi to occupy the same location for over a century.

In 1919, a fire destroyed a significant part of Algonquin’s clubhouse, and until a new clubhouse was completed in 1920, members used the McArdle home on Algonquin Lane. Algonquin saw extensive remodeling in 1989, with relocation of its swimming pool, and rerouting of certain holes on the course.

== Membership ==
Algonquin is a private club. The Club’s membership has included golfers Jimmy Jackson, Sara Guth Costigan, Barbara Berkmeyer, and Eddie Held. Members of the Busch, Anheuser, and Griesedieck families have also been members. As of 2021, the approximate initiation fee was $55,000 with annual dues of $9,000.
