= 2017 Presidents Cup =

Golf match in New Jersey, US

- Dates: September 28 – October 1
- Venue: Liberty National Golf Club
- Location: Jersey City, New Jersey
- Captains: Steve Stricker (USA); Nick Price (International)
USA	19	11	International
- United States wins the Presidents Cup

Location map
- Location within the United States Location within New Jersey Location within New York City

The 2017 Presidents Cup was the 12th edition of the Presidents Cup golf competition, played at Liberty National Golf Club in Jersey City, New Jersey, from September 28 to October 1, 2017. Steve Stricker and Nick Price were the captains of the U.S. and the International teams, respectively.

The United States were the defending champions and retained the trophy.

President Trump presented U.S. Captain Steve Stricker with the trophy. He became the first incumbent U.S. president to do so.

== Course layout ==
Liberty National Golf Club

For this Presidents Cup only, the matches began on what is normally the 5th hole at Liberty National. The order of the holes remained the same, culminating on what is normally the 4th hole.

Hole	1	2	3	4	5	6	7	8	9	Out	10	11	12	13	14	15	16	17	18	In	Total
Yards	427	538	467	611	474	496	225	431	563	4,232	150	481	325	445	490	398	219	395	193	3,096	7,328
Par	4	5	4	5	4	4	3	4	5	38	3	4	4	4	4	4	3	4	3	33	71

== Format ==
The first two days consisted of five matches of foursomes and five matches of fourball. The third day consisted of four matches of foursomes and four matches of fourball. The host team captain decided the order, fourball vs. foursomes, on the first three days. On the fourth and final day, twelve singles matches were played. Thirty matches were played in all. All matches that were all-square after 18 holes were scored as a 1/2 point for each team.

== Team qualification and selection ==
Both teams had 12 players.

Key
Top ten on points list
Two captain's picks
Not picked, in top 15 of points list

=== United States team ===
The United States team featured the 10 players who earned the most official FedExCup points from the 2015 BMW Championship through to the 2017 Dell Technologies Championship, with points earned in the calendar year 2017 counting double, and two captain's picks. Points for events in the FedEx Cup Playoffs were weighted the same as WGC events. The captain's picks were announced on September 6, 2017.

The final standings were:

Position	Player	Points
1	Dustin Johnson	10,455
2	Jordan Spieth	9,572
3	Justin Thomas	8,581
4	Rickie Fowler	5,324
5	Daniel Berger	5,232
6	Brooks Koepka	5,094
7	Kevin Kisner	5,007
8	Patrick Reed	4,599
9	Matt Kuchar	4,479
10	Kevin Chappell	4,369
11	Charley Hoffman	4,369
12	Brian Harman	3,955
13	Jason Dufner	3,897
14	Gary Woodland	3,524
15	Phil Mickelson	3,479

=== International team ===
The International team featured the top 10 players in the Official World Golf Ranking at the conclusion of the 2017 Dell Technologies Championship and two captain's picks. The captain's picks were announced on September 6, 2017.

The final standings were:

Position	Player	Average
1	Hideki Matsuyama	9.21
2	Jason Day	6.35
3	Adam Scott	4.34
4	Louis Oosthuizen	4.26
5	Marc Leishman	3.89
6	Charl Schwartzel	3.64
7	Branden Grace	3.08
8	Kim Si-woo	3.03
9	Jhonattan Vegas	2.98
10	Adam Hadwin	2.60
11	Emiliano Grillo	2.38
12	Hideto Tanihara	2.37
13	Yuta Ikeda	2.16
14	Li Haotong	2.05
15	An Byeong-hun	2.00
16	Anirban Lahiri	1.89

== Teams ==
=== Captains ===
Steve Stricker was the captain of the U.S. team, and Nick Price was the captain of the International team.

Fred Couples, Davis Love III, Tiger Woods and Jim Furyk were captain's assistants for the U.S. team, and Ernie Els, Tony Johnstone, Geoff Ogilvy and Mike Weir were captain's assistants for the International team.

=== Players ===
United States team
Player	Age	Points rank	OWGR	Previous appearances	Matches	W–L–H	Winning percentage
Dustin Johnson	33	1	1	2	9	4–4–1	50.00
Jordan Spieth	24	2	2	2	9	5–4–0	55.56
Justin Thomas	24	3	4	0	Rookie		
Rickie Fowler	28	4	8	1	4	1–3–0	25.00
Daniel Berger	24	5	25	0	Rookie		
Brooks Koepka	27	6	11	0	Rookie		
Kevin Kisner	33	7	24	0	Rookie		
Patrick Reed	27	8	20	1	4	1–2–1	37.50
Matt Kuchar	39	9	12	3	13	4–7–2	38.46
Kevin Chappell	31	10	26	0	Rookie		
Charley Hoffman	40	11	23	0	Rookie		
Phil Mickelson	47	15	30	11	51	23–16–12	56.86

International team
Player	Country	Age	Points rank	OWGR	Previous appearances	Matches	W–L–H	Winning percentage
Hideki Matsuyama	Japan	25	1	3	2	9	3–4–2	44.44
Jason Day	Australia	29	2	7	3	15	4–8–3	36.67
Adam Scott	Australia	37	3	22	7	35	13–17–5	44.29
Louis Oosthuizen	South Africa	34	4	21	2	10	5–3–2	60.00
Marc Leishman	Australia	33	5	16	2	8	3–4–1	43.75
Charl Schwartzel	South Africa	33	6	27	3	14	6–7–1	46.43
Branden Grace	South Africa	29	7	42	2	9	5–4–0	55.56
Kim Si-woo	South Korea	22	8	39	0	Rookie		
Jhonattan Vegas	Venezuela	33	9	38	0	Rookie		
Adam Hadwin	Canada	29	10	47	0	Rookie		
Emiliano Grillo	Argentina	25	11	60	0	Rookie		
Anirban Lahiri	India	30	16	68	1	3	0–3–0	0.00

- Captain's picks shown in yellow
- Ages as of September 28; OWGR as of September 25, the last ranking before the Cup

== Notables ==
Jhonattan Vegas became the first Venezuelan to play in the Presidents Cup. Phil Mickelson played in his twelfth consecutive Presidents Cup.

== Thursday's foursomes matches ==
Rickie Fowler and Justin Thomas won the first point of the day in convincing fashion, winning 8 out of the 14 holes they played. Patrick Reed and Jordan Spieth continued their dominating play as teammates, winning 5 & 4. Matt Kuchar and Dustin Johnson followed up by winning their match 1 up, the first to reach the full 18 holes and the third American point of the day, guaranteeing a United States lead after day one. The International team gained their first point of the day with the South African duo of Branden Grace and Louis Oosthuizen beating Americans Brooks Koepka and Daniel Berger, 3 & 1. The final match, between Americans Kevin Kisner and Phil Mickelson and Australians Jason Day and Marc Leishman, was halved, giving the Americans a 3 1/2 to 1 1/2 lead heading into the second day of competition.

International	Results	United States
Matsuyama/Schwartzel	6 & 4	Fowler/Thomas
Scott/Vegas	1 up	Johnson/Kuchar
Kim/Grillo	5 & 4	Spieth/Reed
Oosthuizen/Grace	3 & 1	Koepka/Berger
Day/Leishman	halved	Mickelson/Kisner
1 1/2	Foursomes	3 1/2
1 1/2	Overall	3 1/2

== Friday's fourball matches ==
The Americans started the day leading 3 1/2 to 1 1/2. Both the American and International squads kept three of the same groupings from Thursday foursomes: Oosthuizen/Grace, Day/Leishman, Scott/Vegas, Spieth/Reed, Fowler/Thomas, and Mickelson/Kisner with one match being a rematch of Day/Leishman versus Mickelson/Kisner from day 1. All four players who sat out Thursday played on Friday. Kevin Chappell and Charley Hoffman were paired together, while the International squad put Adam Hadwin with Matsuyama and Anirban Lahiri with Schwartzel.

International	Results	United States
Matsuyama/Hadwin	halved	Spieth/Reed
Oosthuizen/Grace	3 & 2	Fowler/Thomas
Day/Leishman	1 up	Mickelson/Kisner
Schwartzel/Lahiri	6 & 5	Chappell/Hoffman
Scott/Vegas	3 & 2	Johnson/Koepka
1/2	Fourball	4 1/2
2	Overall	8

== Saturday's matches ==
=== Morning foursomes ===
International	Results	United States
Day/Leishman	4 & 3	Reed/Spieth
Scott/Hadwin	4 & 3	Johnson/Kuchar
Vegas/Grillo	2 & 1	Mickelson/Kisner
Oosthuizen/Grace	halved	Thomas/Fowler
1/2	Foursomes	3 1/2
2 1/2	Overall	11 1/2

=== Afternoon fourball ===
International	Results	United States
Oosthuizen/Day	2 & 1	Reed/Spieth
Vegas/Matsuyama	3 & 2	Berger/Thomas
Lahiri/Kim	1 up	Chappell/Hoffman
Leishman/Grace	3 & 2	Koepka/Johnson
1	Fourball	3
3 1/2	Overall	14 1/2

== Sunday's singles matches ==
International	Results	United States	Timetable
Leishman	halved	Chappell
Day	2 & 1	Hoffman
Matsuyama	3 & 1	Thomas
Kim	2 & 1	Berger
Schwartzel	1 up	Kuchar
Oosthuizen	1 up	Reed
Grace	halved	Johnson
Scott	3 & 2	Koepka
Vegas	2 & 1	Spieth
Lahiri	halved	Kisner
Hadwin	2 & 1	Mickelson
Grillo	6 & 4	Fowler
7 1/2	Singles	4 1/2
11	Overall	19

== Individual player records ==
Each entry refers to the win–loss–half record of the player.

=== United States ===
Player	Points	Overall	Singles	Foursomes	Fourballs
Daniel Berger	2	2–1–0	1–0–0	0–1–0	1–0–0
Kevin Chappell	1.5	1–1–1	0–0–1	0–0–0	1–1–0
Rickie Fowler	3.5	3–0–1	1–0–0	1–0–1	1–0–0
Charley Hoffman	1	1–2–0	0–1–0	0–0–0	1–1–0
Dustin Johnson	4.5	4–0–1	0–0–1	2–0–0	2–0–0
Kevin Kisner	3	2–0–2	0–0–1	1–0–1	1–0–0
Brooks Koepka	2	2–2–0	0–1–0	0–1–0	2–0–0
Matt Kuchar	2	2–1–0	0–1–0	2–0–0	0–0–0
Phil Mickelson	3.5	3–0–1	1–0–0	1–0–1	1–0–0
Patrick Reed	3.5	3–1–1	0–1–0	2–0–0	1–0–1
Jordan Spieth	3.5	3–1–1	0–1–0	2–0–0	1–0–1
Justin Thomas	3.5	3–1–1	0–1–0	1–0–1	2–0–0

=== International ===
Player	Points	Overall	Singles	Foursomes	Fourballs
Jason Day	1.5	1–3–1	1–0–0	0–1–1	0–2–0
Branden Grace	2	1–2–2	0–0–1	1–0–1	0–2–0
Emiliano Grillo	0	0–3–0	0–1–0	0–2–0	0–0–0
Adam Hadwin	0.5	0–2–1	0–1–0	0–1–0	0–0–1
Kim Si-woo	1	1–2–0	0–1–0	0–1–0	1–0–0
Anirban Lahiri	1.5	1–1–1	0–0–1	0–0–0	1–1–0
Marc Leishman	1	0–3–2	0–0–1	0–1–1	0–2–0
Hideki Matsuyama	1.5	1–2–1	1–0–0	0–1–0	0–1–1
Louis Oosthuizen	2.5	2–2–1	1–0–0	1–0–1	0–2–0
Charl Schwartzel	1	1–2–0	1–0–0	0–1–0	0–1–0
Adam Scott	1	1–3–0	1–0–0	0–2–0	0–1–0
Jhonattan Vegas	1	1–4–0	1–0–0	0–2–0	0–2–0
