= 1994 Presidents Cup =

Golf match in Virginia, US

- Dates: September 16–18, 1994
- Venue: Robert Trent Jones Golf Club
- Location: Gainesville, Virginia, U.S.
- Captains: Hale Irwin (USA); David Graham (International)
USA	20	12	International
- United States wins the Presidents Cup

Location map
- Location within the United States Location within Virginia

The 1st Presidents Cup was held between September 16 and 18, 1994. It was played at the Robert Trent Jones Golf Club in Gainesville, Virginia, USA. The United States team won the competition by a margin of 20–12. The honorary chairman was former President of the United States Gerald R. Ford.

== Format ==
The United States team had 12 players including a captain who participated in the event. The International team had 12 players plus a non-playing captain. On the first and second day four-ball was played in the morning and foursomes were played in the afternoon. On the third day only singles were played.

== Teams ==
Greg Norman, ranked second in the International team, withdrew a few days before the event, because of illness. He was replaced by Bradley Hughes who was the highest ranked player available. A number of "international" players were unavailable because of other commitments. Ernie Els, ranked third, played in the Dunhill British Masters, while Masashi "Jumbo" Ozaki and Tsuneyuki "Tommy" Nakajima, ranked fifth and ninth, played in the ANA Open the same week.

United States team
Player	Age	Points rank	OWGR
Hale Irwin – captain	49	7	28
Paul Azinger	34	Non-playing assistant captain	
Jeff Maggert	30	1	26
Tom Lehman	35	2	13
Corey Pavin	34	3	10
John Huston	33	4	34
Loren Roberts	39	5	19
Jim Gallagher Jr.	33	6	52
Scott Hoch	38	8	38
Davis Love III	30	9	17
Fred Couples	34	10	6
Jay Haas	40	11	39
Phil Mickelson	24	14	22

International team
Player	Country	Age	Points rank	OWGR
David Graham	Australia	48	Non-playing captain	
Nick Price	Zimbabwe	37	1	1
David Frost	South Africa	35	4	9
Mark McNulty	Zimbabwe	40	6	15
Vijay Singh	Fiji	31	7	21
Frank Nobilo	New Zealand	34	8	36
Peter Senior	Australia	35	10	41
Steve Elkington	Australia	31	11	40
Craig Parry	Australia	28	12	45
Robert Allenby	Australia	23	14	55
Tsukasa Watanabe	Japan	37	20	82
Fulton Allem	South Africa	37	22	87
Bradley Hughes	Australia	27	27	117

- OWGR as of September 11, 1994, the last ranking before the Cup

== Friday's matches ==
=== Morning four-ball ===
International	Results	United States
Elkington/Singh	2 & 1	Pavin/Maggert
Allem/Frost	6 & 5	Haas/Hoch
Price/Hughes	1 up	Love/Couples
Parry/Allenby	4 & 2	Huston/Gallagher
Nobilo/Senior	3 & 2	Lehman/Mickelson
0	Four-Ball	5
0	Overall	5

=== Afternoon foursomes ===
International	Results	United States
Frost/Allem	3 & 1	Irwin/Roberts
Parry/Watanabe	4 & 3	Haas/Hoch
Nobilo/Allenby	2 & 1	Pavin/Maggert
Elkington/Singh	2 & 1	Mickelson/Lehman
Price/McNulty	halved	Love/Gallagher
2 1/2	Foursomes	2 1/2
2 1/2	Overall	7 1/2

== Saturday's matches ==
=== Morning four-ball ===
International	Results	United States
Allem/McNulty	4 & 3	Gallagher/Huston
Watanabe/Singh	3 & 1	Haas/Hoch
Parry/Hughes	4 & 3	Roberts/Lehman
Nobilo/Allenby	2 up	Couples/Love
Price/Elkington	halved	Mickelson/Pavin
3 1/2	Four-Ball	1 1/2
6	Overall	9

=== Afternoon foursomes ===
International	Results	United States
Frost/Senior	6 & 5	Irwin/Haas
Parry/Allem	1 up	Pavin/Roberts
Singh/Elkington	3 & 2	Maggert/Huston
Nobilo/Allenby	7 & 5	Love/Gallagher
Hughes/McNulty	3 & 2	Mickelson/Lehman
2	Foursomes	3
8	Overall	12

== Sunday's matches ==
=== Singles ===
International	Results	United States
Allenby	1 up	Irwin
McNulty	4 & 3	Haas
Watanabe	4 & 3	Gallagher
Allem	halved	Mickelson
Singh	halved	Lehman
Senior	3 & 2	Huston
Frost	halved	Hoch
Hughes	2 & 1	Maggert
Nobilo	halved	Roberts
Price	1 up	Couples
Elkington	1 up	Love
Parry	1 up	Pavin
4	Singles	8
12	Overall	20

== Individual player records ==
Each entry refers to the win–loss–half record of the player.

=== United States ===
Player	Points	Overall	Singles	Foursomes	Fourballs
Fred Couples	3	3–0–0	1–0–0	0–0–0	2–0–0
Jim Gallagher Jr.	3.5	3–1–1	1–0–0	1–0–1	1–1–0
Jay Haas	3	3–2–0	1–0–0	1–1–0	1–1–0
Scott Hoch	2.5	2–1–1	0–0–1	1–0–0	1–1–0
John Huston	1	1–3–0	0–1–0	0–1–0	1–1–0
Hale Irwin	2	2–1–0	1–0–0	1–1–0	0–0–0
Tom Lehman	2.5	2–2–1	0–0–1	1–1–0	1–1–0
Davis Love III	4.5	4–0–1	1–0–0	1–0–1	2–0–0
Jeff Maggert	2	2–2–0	1–0–0	0–2–0	1–0–0
Phil Mickelson	3	2–1–2	0–0–1	1–1–0	1–0–1
Corey Pavin	2.5	2–2–1	0–1–0	1–1–0	1–0–1
Loren Roberts	2.5	2–1–1	0–0–1	2–0–0	0–1–0

=== International ===
Player	Points	Overall	Singles	Foursomes	Fourballs
Fulton Allem	1.5	1–3–1	0–0–1	0–2–0	1–1–0
Robert Allenby	1	1–4–0	0–1–0	1–1–0	0–2–0
Steve Elkington	2.5	2–2–1	0–1–0	2–0–0	0–1–1
David Frost	1.5	1–2–1	0–0–1	1–1–0	0–1–0
Bradley Hughes	1	1–3–0	0–1–0	0–1–0	1–1–0
Mark McNulty	1.5	1–2–1	0–1–0	0–1–1	1–0–0
Frank Nobilo	1.5	1–3–1	0–0–1	1–1–0	0–2–0
Craig Parry	2	2–3–0	1–0–0	0–2–0	1–1–0
Nick Price	1	0–2–2	0–1–0	0–0–1	0–1–1
Peter Senior	2	2–1–0	1–0–0	1–0–0	0–1–0
Vijay Singh	3.5	3–1–1	0–0–1	2–0–0	1–1–0
Tsukasa Watanabe	1	1–2–0	0–1–0	0–1–0	1–0–0
