= 1994 Open Championship =

Coordinates: 55.316°N 4.832°W

Tournament information
- Dates: 14–17 July 1994
- Location: South Ayrshire, Scotland
- Course(s): Turnberry; Ailsa Course
- Tour(s): European Tour; PGA Tour

Statistics
- Par: 70
- Length: 6,957 yards (6,361 m)
- Field: 156 players, 81 after cut
- Cut: 143 (+3)
- Prize fund: £1,000,000 €1,579,620 $1,650,000
- Winner's share: £110,000 €154,000 $178,200

Champion
- (Zimbabwe) Nick Price
- 268 (−12)

Location in Scotland
Location in South Ayrshire, Scotland

The 1994 Open Championship was a men's major golf championship and the 123rd Open Championship, held from 14 to 17 July at Turnberry Golf Resort, Scotland. Nick Price won the second of his three major championships and only Claret Jug, one stroke ahead of runner-up Jesper Parnevik.

Price was three-under over the final three holes and posted 66 (−4), while Parnevik, in the group ahead, bogeyed the 72nd hole to miss a playoff. It was the first of two consecutive majors for Price, who won his second PGA Championship a month later.

== Course ==
Ailsa Course

| Hole | Name | Yards | Par | Hole | Name | Yards | Par |
|---|---|---|---|---|---|---|---|
| 1 | Ailsa Craig | 350 | 4 | 10 | Dinna Fouter | 452 | 4 |
| 2 | Mak Siccar | 428 | 4 | 11 | Maidens | 177 | 3 |
| 3 | Blaw Wearie | 462 | 4 | 12 | Monument | 448 | 4 |
| 4 | Woe-Be-Tide | 167 | 3 | 13 | Tickly Tap | 411 | 4 |
| 5 | Fin Me Oot | 441 | 4 | 14 | Risk-An-Hope | 440 | 4 |
| 6 | Tappie Toorie | 222 | 3 | 15 | Ca' Canny | 209 | 3 |
| 7 | Roon The Ben | 528 | 5 | 16 | Wee Burn | 409 | 4 |
| 8 | Goat Fell | 427 | 4 | 17 | Lang Whang | 500 | 5 |
| 9 | Bruce's Castle | 455 | 4 | 18 | Ailsa Hame ^ | 431 | 4 |
| Out | | 3,480 | 35 | In | | 3,477 | 35 |
| Source: | | | | Total | | 6,957 | 70 |

^ The 18th hole was renamed "Duel in the Sun" in 2003.

Previous lengths of the course for The Open Championship:

- 1986: 6,957 yards (6,361 m), par 70
- 1977: 6,875 yards (6,286 m), par 70

== Round summaries ==
=== First round ===
Thursday, 14 July 1994

| Place | Player | Score | To par |
|---|---|---|---|
| 1 | (New Zealand) Greg Turner | 65 | −5 |
| 2 | (England) Jonathan Lomas | 66 | −4 |
| 3 | (United States) Andrew Magee | 67 | −3 |
| T4 | (United States) John Daly | 68 | −2 |
| T4 | (United States) David Edwards | 68 | −2 |
| T4 | (Northern Ireland) David Feherty | 68 | −2 |
| T4 | (Australia) Wayne Grady | 68 | −2 |
| T4 | (England) Ross McFarlane | 68 | −2 |
| T4 | (Sweden) Jesper Parnevik | 68 | −2 |
| T4 | (United States) Loren Roberts | 68 | −2 |
| T4 | (Australia) Peter Senior | 68 | −2 |
| T4 | (France) Jean van de Velde | 68 | −2 |
| T4 | (United States) Tom Watson | 68 | −2 |
| T4 | (United States) Brian Watts | 68 | −2 |

=== Second round ===
Friday, 15 July 1994

| Place | Player | Score | To par |
|---|---|---|---|
| 1 | (United States) Tom Watson | 68-65=133 | −7 |
| T2 | (United States) Brad Faxon | 69-65=134 | −6 |
| T2 | (Sweden) Jesper Parnevik | 68-66=134 | −6 |
| 4 | (Zimbabwe) Nick Price | 69-66=135 | −5 |
| T5 | (United States) David Edwards | 68-68=136 | −4 |
| T5 | (England) Jonathan Lomas | 66-70=136 | −4 |
| T5 | (New Zealand) Frank Nobilo | 69-67=136 | −4 |
| T5 | (New Zealand) Greg Turner | 65-71=136 | −4 |
| T9 | (Northern Ireland) David Feherty | 68-69=137 | −3 |
| T9 | (Northern Ireland) Ronan Rafferty | 71-66=137 | −3 |
| T9 | (United States) Loren Roberts | 68-69=137 | −3 |
| T9 | (United States) Fuzzy Zoeller | 71-66=137 | −3 |

Amateurs: Bennett (−1), James (+5), Evans (+9), Harris (+9), Pullan (+15)

=== Third round ===
Saturday, 16 July 1994

| Place | Player | Score | To par |
|---|---|---|---|
| T1 | (United States) Brad Faxon | 69-65-67=201 | −9 |
| T1 | (United States) Fuzzy Zoeller | 71-66-64=201 | −9 |
| T3 | (Northern Ireland) Ronan Rafferty | 71-66-65=202 | −8 |
| T3 | (Zimbabwe) Nick Price | 69-66-67=202 | −8 |
| T3 | (Sweden) Jesper Parnevik | 68-66-68=202 | −8 |
| T3 | (United States) Tom Watson | 68-65-69=202 | −8 |
| 7 | (Northern Ireland) David Feherty | 68-69-66=203 | −7 |
| 8 | (England) Mark James | 72-67-66=205 | −5 |
| T9 | (United States) Larry Mize | 73-69-64=206 | −4 |
| T9 | (Scotland) Colin Montgomerie | 72-69-65=206 | −4 |
| T9 | (Scotland) Andrew Coltart | 71-69-66=206 | −4 |
| T9 | (United States) Tom Kite | 71-69-66=206 | −4 |
| T9 | (United States) Craig Stadler | 71-69-66=206 | −4 |
| T9 | (Japan) Jumbo Ozaki | 69-71-66=206 | −4 |
| T9 | (United States) Peter Jacobsen | 69-70-67=206 | −4 |
| T9 | (Australia) Peter Senior | 68-71-67=206 | −4 |
| T9 | (United States) Davis Love III | 71-67-68=206 | −4 |
| T9 | (United States) Loren Roberts | 68-69-69=206 | −4 |
| T9 | (New Zealand) Greg Turner | 65-71-70=206 | −4 |

=== Final round ===
Sunday, 17 July 1994

| Place | Player | Score | To par | Money (£) |
|---|---|---|---|---|
| 1 | (Zimbabwe) Nick Price | 69-66-67-66=268 | −12 | 110,000 |
| 2 | (Sweden) Jesper Parnevik | 68-66-68-67=269 | −11 | 88,000 |
| 3 | (United States) Fuzzy Zoeller | 71-66-64-70=271 | −9 | 74,000 |
| T4 | (Sweden) Anders Forsbrand | 72-71-66-64=273 | −7 | 50,667 |
| T4 | (England) Mark James | 72-67-66-68=273 | −7 | 50,667 |
| T4 | (Northern Ireland) David Feherty | 68-69-66-70=273 | −7 | 50,667 |
| 7 | (United States) Brad Faxon | 69-65-67-73=274 | −6 | 36,000 |
| T8 | (England) Nick Faldo | 75-66-70-64=275 | −5 | 30,000 |
| T8 | (United States) Tom Kite | 71-69-66-69=275 | −5 | 30,000 |
| T8 | (Scotland) Colin Montgomerie | 72-69-65-69=275 | −5 | 30,000 |

Amateurs: Bennett (+6)

==== Scorecard ====
| Hole | 1 | 2 | 3 | 4 | 5 | 6 | 7 | 8 | 9 | 10 | 11 | 12 | 13 | 14 | 15 | 16 | 17 | 18 |
|---|---|---|---|---|---|---|---|---|---|---|---|---|---|---|---|---|---|---|
| Par | 4 | 4 | 4 | 3 | 4 | 3 | 5 | 4 | 4 | 4 | 3 | 4 | 4 | 4 | 3 | 4 | 5 | 4 |
| (Zimbabwe) Price | −8 | −7 | −7 | −8 | −7 | −7 | −8 | −8 | −8 | −8 | −8 | −9 | −9 | −9 | −9 | −10 | −12 | −12 |
| (Sweden) Parnevik | −8 | −8 | −8 | −8 | −8 | −8 | −8 | −8 | −8 | −8 | −9 | −10 | −11 | −11 | −10 | −11 | −12 | −11 |
| (United States) Zoeller | −9 | −10 | −10 | −10 | −10 | −9 | −9 | −9 | −8 | −8 | −9 | −9 | −8 | −8 | −8 | −8 | −8 | −9 |
| (Sweden) Forsbrand | −1 | −1 | −1 | −2 | −2 | −2 | −2 | −2 | −3 | −4 | −5 | −5 | −5 | −6 | −5 | −5 | −7 | −7 |
| (England) James | −5 | −5 | −5 | −4 | −4 | −5 | −5 | −5 | −5 | −5 | −5 | −5 | −5 | −6 | −5 | −5 | −7 | −7 |
| (Northern Ireland) Feherty | −7 | −7 | −7 | −7 | −7 | −7 | −7 | −7 | −7 | −8 | −8 | −8 | −8 | −8 | −8 | −8 | −7 | −7 |

Cumulative tournament scores, relative to par

| Eagle | Birdie | Bogey | Double bogey | Triple bogey+ |
