= Lake Manassas =

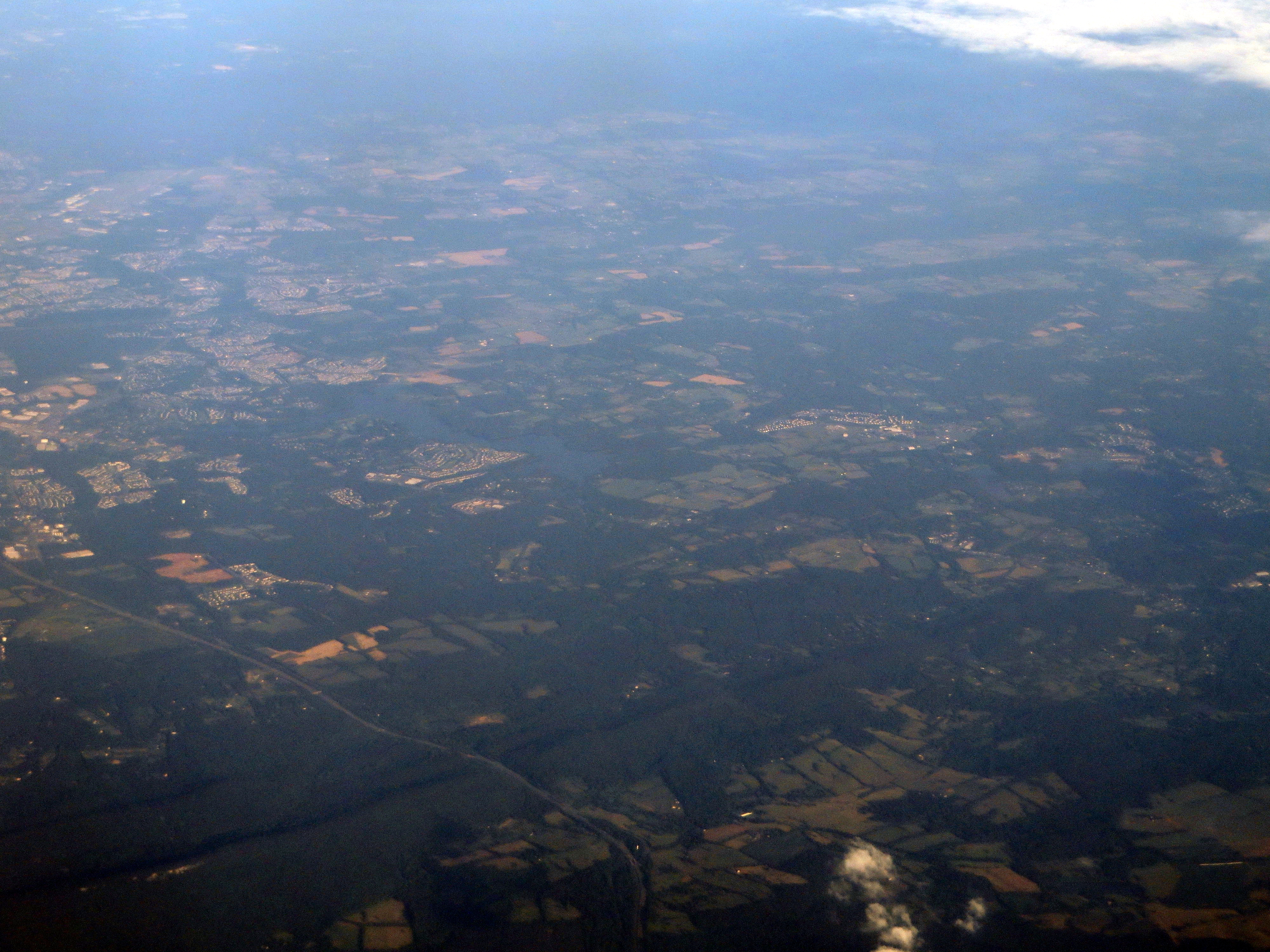
- Aerial view of Lake Manassas

- Location within Virginia Location within the United States
- Location: Prince William County, Virginia, United States
- Coordinates: 38°46′21″N 77°38′47″W
- Type: reservoir
- Primary inflows: Broad Run (Occoquan River tributary)
- Basin countries: United States
- Built: 1969
- Surface area: 770 acres (310 ha)
- Surface elevation: 279 ft (85 m)

Lake Manassas is a 770-acre (310 ha) reservoir located in Prince William County, Virginia, to the southwest of Gainesville. It is owned and operated by the city of Manassas, Virginia, although it is located outside the city limits. The reservoir was created in the late 1960s to provide drinking water for area residents and became operational in 1970. Today it contributes to a regional water system which serves the cities of Manassas and Manassas Park, Virginia, and unincorporated areas of Prince William County. Several golf clubs have courses along the banks, including Stonewall Golf Club and Robert Trent Jones Golf Club.

== Public closure ==
Beginning in the 1980s, and continuing until 1995, public access to the lake was possible via a private marina. In 1999 the marina operator and the City of Manassas did not reach a mutually acceptable contract extension and the marina was closed. Since then, there has been no public boating access to Lake Manassas. In 2004, citing concerns over terrorism and the possibility of contamination by Zebra Mussels, the Manassas City Council passed an ordinance making it illegal to operate a boat on Lake Manassas. Periodic attempts have been made by the city, county, and various others to reopen the lake for public use; however, as of April 2012, none have been successful.

== Lawsuit ==
In 2010, developers building a subdivision partially bordering Lake Manassas offered to donate 25 acres of their land to the City of Manassas to be used as a marina. In June 2010, officials from the Virginia Department of Game and Inland Fisheries and George Mason University's Freedom Aquatic & Fitness Center presented a plan to use the donated land as a marina, however the City Council never acted to accept or reject the proposal, citing continued concerns over operating costs and how the marina would be managed to ensure the protection of the drinking water supply. The developer filed a lawsuit to force the city to grant access to the residents, but postponed court action until the issue could be negotiated outside court. When the city failed to act on the 2010 proposal, the developer returned to court, and in February, 2011, a Prince William Circuit Court ruling cleared the way for the lawsuit, though a trial date was not set.

The lake is cited as a top bass and crappie fishery in the region. It was regularly stocked with fish prior to its closure to the public.
