= Nick Price =

Zimbabwean professional golfer

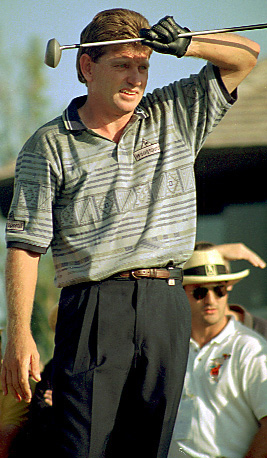
- Price in 1994

Personal information
- Full name: Nicholas Raymond Leige Price
- Nationality: Rhodesia (until 1978); Southern Rhodesia (1979–1980); Zimbabwe (1980–)
- Born: 28 January 1957 (age 69) Durban, Natal, Union of South Africa
- Height: 6 ft 0 in (1.83 m)
- Weight: 190 lb (86 kg; 14 st)

Career
- Sport: Golf
- Turned professional: 1977
- Former tours: PGA Tour; European Tour; Sunshine Tour; Champions Tour
- Professional wins: 48
- Highest ranking: 1 (14 August 1994) (44 weeks)

Number of wins by tour
- PGA Tour: 18
- European Tour: 7
- Japan Golf Tour: 1
- Sunshine Tour: 12
- PGA Tour of Australasia: 2
- PGA Tour Champions: 4
- Other: 11

Best results in major championships (wins: 3)
- Masters Tournament: 5th: 1986
- PGA Championship: Won: 1992, 1994
- U.S. Open: 4th/T4: 1992, 1998
- The Open Championship: Won: 1994

Achievements and awards
- World Golf Hall of Fame: 2003 (member page)
- Southern Africa Tour Order of Merit winner: 1982–83, 1996–97
- PGA Tour money list winner: 1993, 1994
- PGA Tour Player of the Year: 1993, 1994
- PGA Player of the Year: 1993, 1994
- Byron Nelson Award: 1997
- Vardon Trophy: 1993, 1997
- Payne Stewart Award: 2002
- Bob Jones Award: 2005
- Old Tom Morris Award: 2011

Nicholas Raymond Leige Price (born 28 January 1957) is a Zimbabwean former professional golfer who has won three major championships in his career: the PGA Championship twice (in 1992 and 1994) and The Open Championship in 1994. In the mid-1990s, Price reached number one in the Official World Golf Ranking. He was inducted into the World Golf Hall of Fame in 2003.

== Early life ==
Price was born in Durban, South Africa. His parents were originally British. His father was English and his mother Welsh. His early life was spent in Rhodesia. For secondary school, he attended Prince Edward School in Salisbury where he captained the golf team. As a teenager, he participated in the 1975 Rhodesian Dunlop Masters and Holiday Inns Invitational, official events on the Southern African Tour.

After his schooling he served in the Rhodesian Air Force during that country's Bush War.

== Professional career ==
He began his professional golf career in 1977 on the South African Tour, before moving to the European Tour and finally the PGA Tour in 1983. In 1984, Price renounced his Zimbabwean citizenship and thereafter played under his British passport. It was not until 1996 that Price regained his dual citizenship.

Price's first win was at the 1979 Asseng TV Challenge Series on the Southern African Tour. He won his first tournament outside of South Africa at the 1980 Swiss Open on the European Tour. He was still relatively unknown when he finished tied for second with Peter Oosterhuis one shot behind Tom Watson at the 1982 Open Championship after having a three-shot lead with six holes to play. Price also won the Sunshine Tour Order of Merit for the 1982/83 season.

Price earned PGA Tour membership after finishing 3rd place at 1982 PGA Tour Qualifying School. In 1983, Price won his first PGA Tour event with a wire to wire four-shot triumph over Jack Nicklaus at the World Series of Golf. After that win, it would be almost another eight years before Price won again on the PGA Tour. In the interim, Price shot an Augusta National Golf Club course record 63 at the 1986 Masters Tournament and finished second at the 1988 Open Championship to Seve Ballesteros.

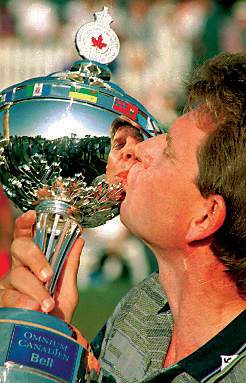
Nick Price with Canadian Open trophy

By the mid-1990s, Price was regarded as the best player in the world, and in 1994 he won two majors back-to-back, The Open and the PGA Championship, adding to his first major, the 1992 PGA Championship. He topped the PGA Tour money list in 1993 and 1994, setting a new earnings record each time, and spent 43 weeks at number one in the Official World Golf Rankings.

Price would have won the Southern African Tour's Order of Merit in 1996/97 if he had met the minimum number of tournaments. In 1993 and 1997, Price was awarded the Vardon Trophy; it is given annually by the PGA of America to the player with the lowest adjusted scoring average with a minimum of 60 rounds.

During his early career and peak, Price was one of the best ball strikers in the game along with his friend and contemporary Greg Norman (who in 1996 tied Price's Augusta National course record of 63).

Like fellow African Gary Player, Price has expressed his distaste for the Ryder Cup, saying of the event, "If you like root canals and hemorrhoids, you'd love it there", but he played five times as a member of the Presidents Cup.

Price has expanded into golf design with his own company operating out of Florida, and he has his own line of signature golf apparel. He was widely regarded by fans, media and his fellow players as one of the most personable golfers on the PGA Tour. He won his first Champions Tour event at the 2009 Outback Steakhouse Pro-Am by two strokes over Larry Nelson.

== Personal life ==
Price is married to Sue and has three children. They live in Hobe Sound, Florida. His nephew Ray Price is a former national cricketer for the Zimbabwe national cricket team.

== Awards and honors ==
- In 2003, Price was inducted into the World Golf Hall of Fame.
- In 2005, he was voted to be given the Bob Jones Award, the highest honor given by the USGA in recognition of distinguished sportsmanship in golf.
- In 2011, he was bestowed with Old Tom Morris Award, the highest honour given by the GCSAA to an individual who "through a continuing lifetime commitment to the game of golf has helped to mold the welfare of the game in a manner and style exemplified by Old Tom Morris."

== Professional wins (48) ==
=== PGA Tour wins (18) ===
Legend
Major championships (3)
Players Championships (1)
Other PGA Tour (14)

No.	Date	Tournament	Winning score	Margin of victory	Runner(s)-up
1	28 Aug 1983	World Series of Golf	−10 (66-68-69-67=270)	4 strokes	(United States) Jack Nicklaus
2	5 May 1991	GTE Byron Nelson Classic	−10 (68-64-70-68=270)	1 stroke	(United States) Craig Stadler
3	8 Sep 1991	Canadian Open	−15 (71-69-67-66=273)	1 stroke	(United States) David Edwards
4	16 Aug 1992	PGA Championship	−6 (70-70-68-70=278)	3 strokes	(United States) John Cook, (England) Nick Faldo, (United States) Jim Gallagher Jr., (United States) Gene Sauers
5	25 Oct 1992	H.E.B. Texas Open	−21 (67-62-68-66=263)	Playoff	(Australia) Steve Elkington
6	28 Mar 1993	The Players Championship	−18 (64-68-71-67=270)	5 strokes	(Germany) Bernhard Langer
7	27 Jun 1993	Canon Greater Hartford Open	−9 (67-70-69-65=271)	1 stroke	(United States) Roger Maltbie, (United States) Dan Forsman
8	4 Jul 1993	Sprint Western Open	−19 (64-71-67-67=269)	5 strokes	(Australia) Greg Norman
9	1 Aug 1993	Federal Express St. Jude Classic	−18 (69-65-66-66=266)	3 strokes	(United States) Jeff Maggert, (United States) Rick Fehr
10	13 Mar 1994	Honda Classic	−12 (70-67-73-66=276)	1 stroke	(Australia) Craig Parry
11	30 May 1994	Southwestern Bell Colonial	−14 (65-70-67-64=266)	Playoff	(United States) Scott Simpson
12	3 Jul 1994	Motorola Western Open (2)	−11 (67-67-72-71=277)	1 stroke	(United States) Greg Kraft
13	17 Jul 1994	The Open Championship	−12 (69-66-67-66=268)	1 stroke	(Sweden) Jesper Parnevik
14	14 Aug 1994	PGA Championship (2)	−11 (67-65-70-67=269)	6 strokes	(United States) Corey Pavin
15	11 Sep 1994	Bell Canadian Open (2)	−13 (67-72-68-68=275)	1 stroke	(United States) Mark Calcavecchia
16	20 Apr 1997	MCI Classic	−15 (65-69-69-66=269)	6 strokes	(United States) Brad Faxon, (Sweden) Jesper Parnevik
17	2 Aug 1998	FedEx St. Jude Classic (2)	−16 (65-67-70-66=268)	Playoff	(United States) Jeff Sluman
18	19 May 2002	MasterCard Colonial (2)	−13 (69-65-66-67=267)	5 strokes	(United States) Kenny Perry, (United States) David Toms

PGA Tour playoff record (3–3)

No.	Year	Tournament	Opponent(s)	Result
1	1986	Western Open	(United States) Fred Couples, (South Africa) David Frost, (United States) Tom Kite	Kite won with birdie on first extra hole
2	1992	H.E.B. Texas Open	(Australia) Steve Elkington	Won with par on second extra hole
3	1994	Southwestern Bell Colonial	(United States) Scott Simpson	Won with birdie on first extra hole
4	1995	NEC World Series of Golf	(United States) Billy Mayfair, (Australia) Greg Norman	Norman won with birdie on first extra hole
5	1998	FedEx St. Jude Classic	(United States) Jeff Sluman	Won with birdie on second extra hole
6	2000	Advil Western Open	(Australia) Robert Allenby	Lost to par on first extra hole

=== European Tour wins (7) ===
Legend
Major championships (3)
Other European Tour (4)

No.	Date	Tournament	Winning score	Margin of victory	Runner-up
1	31 Aug 1980	Swiss Open	−21 (65-69-67-66=267)	6 strokes	(Spain) Manuel Calero
2	6 Oct 1985	Trophée Lancôme	−13 (66-71-67-71=275)	Playoff	(England) Mark James
3	16 Aug 1992	PGA Championship	−6 (70-70-68-70=278)	3 strokes	(United States) John Cook, (England) Nick Faldo, (United States) Jim Gallagher Jr., (United States) Gene Sauers
4	17 Jul 1994	The Open Championship	−12 (69-66-67-66=268)	1 stroke	(Sweden) Jesper Parnevik
5	14 Aug 1994	PGA Championship (2)	−11 (67-65-70-67=269)	6 strokes	(United States) Corey Pavin
6	16 Feb 1997	Dimension Data Pro-Am^{1}	−20 (67-66-66-69=268)	8 strokes	(South Africa) David Frost
7	23 Feb 1997	Alfred Dunhill South African PGA Championship^{1}	−19 (67-66-70-66=269)	Playoff	(South Africa) David Frost

^{1}Co-sanctioned by the Southern Africa Tour

European Tour playoff record (2–0)

No.	Year	Tournament	Opponent	Result
1	1985	Trophée Lancôme	(England) Mark James	Won with par on third extra hole
2	1997	Alfred Dunhill South African PGA Championship	(South Africa) David Frost	Won with par on first extra hole

=== Japan Golf Tour wins (1) ===
No.	Date	Tournament	Winning score	Margin of victory	Runner-up
1	12 Sep 1999	Suntory Open	−8 (67-71-70-68=276)	1 stroke	(Japan) Shigeki Maruyama

=== Southern Africa Tour wins (12) ===
No.	Date	Tournament	Winning score	Margin of victory	Runner(s)-up
1	25 Oct 1979	Asseng TV Challenge Series			(South Africa) John Bland, (South Africa) Allan Henning, (South Africa) Phil Simmons
2	14 Feb 1981	SAB South African Masters	−7 (69-75-67-70=281)	4 strokes	(Zimbabwe) Mark McNulty
3	13 Feb 1982	Sigma Vaal Reefs Open	−13 (70-66-64-71=275)	5 strokes	(South Africa) John Bland, (Zimbabwe) Denis Watson
4	12 Jan 1985	ICL International	−20 (67-66-69-66=268)	1 stroke	(South Africa) Gavan Levenson
5	31 Jan 1993	ICL International (2)	−15 (66-72-65-70=273)	2 strokes	(Zimbabwe) Mark McNulty, (United States) Bruce Vaughan
6	23 Jan 1994	ICL International (3)	−21 (61-69-65-72=267)	9 strokes	(South Africa) David Frost, (United States) Bruce Vaughan
7	26 Nov 1995	Zimbabwe Open	−22 (70-65-66-65=266)	1 stroke	(South Africa) Brenden Pappas
8	16 Feb 1997	Dimension Data Pro-Am^{1}	−20 (67-66-66-69=268)	8 strokes	(South Africa) David Frost
9	23 Feb 1997	Alfred Dunhill South African PGA Championship^{1}	−19 (67-66-70-66=269)	Playoff	(South Africa) David Frost
10	30 Nov 1997	Zimbabwe Open (2)	−19 (68-67-66-68=269)	2 strokes	(Zimbabwe) Mark McNulty, (South Africa) Brenden Pappas
11	22 Feb 1998	Dimension Data Pro-Am (2)	−12 (69-67-68-72=276)	5 strokes	(Zimbabwe) Mark McNulty
12	29 Nov 1998	Zimbabwe Open (3)	−17 (69-68-71-63=271)	5 strokes	(South Africa) Tjaart van der Walt

^{1}Co-sanctioned by the European Tour

Southern Africa Tour playoff record (1–1)

No.	Year	Tournament	Opponent	Result
1	1984	Goodyear Classic	(South Africa) John Bland	Lost to birdie on first extra hole
2	1997	Alfred Dunhill South African PGA Championship	(South Africa) David Frost	Won with par on first extra hole

=== PGA Tour of Australasia wins (2) ===
No.	Date	Tournament	Winning score	Margin of victory	Runner(s)-up
1	26 Nov 1989	West End South Australian Open	−15 (70-71-67-69=277)	5 strokes	(Australia) Lucien Tinkler, (Australia) Paul Foley
2	8 Nov 1992	Air New Zealand Shell Open	−9 (70-65-73-63=271)	Playoff	(Australia) Lucas Parsons

PGA Tour of Australasia playoff record (1–0)

No.	Year	Tournament	Opponent	Result
1	1992	Air New Zealand Shell Open	(Australia) Lucas Parsons	Won with par on first extra hole

=== Other European wins (1) ===
- 1981 San Remo Masters (Italy)

=== Other wins (8) ===
No.	Date	Tournament	Winning score	Margin of victory	Runner(s)-up
1	11 Nov 1992	PGA Grand Slam of Golf	−7 (70-67=137)	Playoff	(United States) Tom Kite
2	5 Dec 1993	Nedbank Million Dollar Challenge	−24 (67-66-66-65=264)	12 strokes	(Zimbabwe) Mark McNulty
3	12 Nov 1995	Hassan II Golf Trophy	−6 (69-71-74-72=286)	2 strokes	(England) Roger Chapman
4	7 Dec 1997	Nedbank Million Dollar Challenge (2)	−13 (71-68-68-68=275)	1 stroke	(South Africa) Ernie Els, (United States) Davis Love III
5	6 Dec 1998	Nedbank Million Dollar Challenge (3)	−15 (67-68-72-66=273)	Playoff	(United States) Tiger Woods
6	10 Jul 2001	CVS Charity Classic (with (United States) Mark Calcavecchia)	−15 (60-59=119)	Playoff	(United States) Brad Faxon and (South Africa) Gary Player
7	20 Jun 2006	CVS/pharmacy Charity Classic (2) (with (South Africa) Tim Clark)	−19 (61-62=123)	Playoff	(United States) Brad Faxon and (Canada) Mike Weir
8	23 Jun 2009	CVS Caremark Charity Classic (3) (with (United States) David Toms)	−16 (66-60=126)	3 strokes	(United States) Laura Diaz and (United States) Matt Kuchar

Other playoff record (4–0)

No.	Year	Tournament	Opponent(s)	Result
1	1992	PGA Grand Slam of Golf	(United States) Tom Kite	Won with par on first extra hole
2	1998	Nedbank Million Dollar Challenge	(United States) Tiger Woods	Won with birdie on fifth extra hole
3	2001	CVS Charity Classic (with (United States) Mark Calcavecchia)	(United States) Brad Faxon and (South Africa) Gary Player	Won with birdie on first extra hole
4	2006	CVS/pharmacy Charity Classic (with (South Africa) Tim Clark)	(United States) Brad Faxon and (Canada) Mike Weir	Won with birdie on second extra hole

=== Champions Tour wins (4) ===
No.	Date	Tournament	Winning score	Margin of victory	Runner(s)-up
1	19 Apr 2009	Outback Steakhouse Pro-Am	−9 (66-67-71=204)	2 strokes	(United States) Larry Nelson
2	25 Apr 2010	Liberty Mutual Legends of Golf (with (United States) Mark O'Meara)	−28 (62-64-62=188)	Playoff	(United States) John Cook and (United States) Joey Sindelar
3	6 Jun 2010	Principal Charity Classic	−14 (67-65-67=199)	4 strokes	(United States) Tommy Armour III
4	13 Mar 2011	Toshiba Classic	−17 (60-68-68=196)	1 stroke	(United States) Mark Wiebe

Champions Tour playoff record (1–1)

No.	Year	Tournament	Opponents	Result
1	2009	Principal Charity Classic	(United States) Fred Funk, (Republic of Ireland) Mark McNulty	McNulty won with birdie on fourth extra hole Price eliminated by birdie on second hole
2	2010	Liberty Mutual Legends of Golf (with (United States) Mark O'Meara)	(United States) John Cook and (United States) Joey Sindelar	Won with par on second extra hole

== Playoff record ==
Asian PGA Tour playoff record (0–1)

No.	Year	Tournament	Opponent	Result
1	2002	Macau Open	(China) Zhang Lianwei	Lost to par on fifth extra hole

Challenge Tour playoff record (0–1)

No.	Year	Tournament	Opponents	Result
1	1991	Zimbabwe Open	(England) Grant Turner, (England) Keith Waters	Waters won with birdie on fifth extra hole Price eliminated by par on first hole

== Major championships ==
=== Wins (3) ===
Year	Championship	54 holes	Winning score	Margin	Runner(s)-up
1992	PGA Championship	2 shot deficit	−6 (70-70-68-70=278)	3 strokes	(United States) John Cook, (England) Nick Faldo, (United States) Jim Gallagher Jr., (United States) Gene Sauers
1994	The Open Championship	1 shot deficit	−12 (69-66-67-66=268)	1 stroke	(Sweden) Jesper Parnevik
1994	PGA Championship (2)	3 shot lead	−11 (67-65-70-67=269)	6 strokes	(United States) Corey Pavin

=== Results timeline ===
Tournament	1975	1976	1977	1978	1979
Masters Tournament					
U.S. Open					
The Open Championship	CUT			T39	
PGA Championship					

Tournament	1980	1981	1982	1983	1984	1985	1986	1987	1988	1989
Masters Tournament					CUT		5	T22	T14	CUT
U.S. Open				T48		CUT		T17	T40	CUT
The Open Championship	T27	T23	T2	CUT	T44	CUT		T8	2	CUT
PGA Championship				T67	T54	5	CUT	T10	T17	T46

Tournament	1990	1991	1992	1993	1994	1995	1996	1997	1998	1999
Masters Tournament		T49	T6	CUT	T35	CUT	T18	T24	CUT	T6
U.S. Open		T19	T4	T11	CUT	T13		T19	4	T23
The Open Championship	T25	T44	T51	T6	1	T40	T45	CUT	T29	T37
PGA Championship	T63		1	T31	1	T39	T8	T13	T4	5

Tournament	2000	2001	2002	2003	2004	2005	2006
Masters Tournament	T11	CUT	T20	T23	T6	CUT	
U.S. Open	T27	CUT	T8	T5	T24	T9	CUT
The Open Championship	CUT	T21	T14	T28	T30	CUT	
PGA Championship	CUT	T29	CUT				CUT

Win
Top 10
Did not play

CUT = missed the halfway cut
"T" indicates a tie for a place.

=== Summary ===
Tournament	Wins	2nd	3rd	Top-5	Top-10	Top-25	Events	Cuts made
Masters Tournament	0	0	0	1	4	11	20	13
U.S. Open	0	0	0	3	5	12	20	15
The Open Championship	1	2	0	3	5	9	27	20
PGA Championship	2	0	0	5	7	9	20	16
Totals	3	2	0	12	21	41	87	64

- Most consecutive cuts made – 10 (1989 PGA – 1992 PGA)
- Longest streak of top-10s – 2 (five times)

== The Players Championship ==
=== Wins (1) ===
Year	Championship	54 holes	Winning score	Margin	Runner-up
1993	The Players Championship	1 shot lead	−18 (64-68-71-67=270)	5 strokes	(Germany) Bernhard Langer

=== Results timeline ===
Tournament	1984	1985	1986	1987	1988	1989	1990	1991	1992	1993	1994	1995	1996	1997	1998	1999	2000	2001	2002	2003	2004	2005	2006
The Players Championship	7	T22	T58	T24	DQ	CUT	T16	T9	8	1	CUT	T37	T46	T24	T8	3	T3	T10	T9	CUT	T42	T32	T27

Win
Top 10

CUT = missed the halfway cut
DQ = disqualified
"T" indicates a tie for a place.

== Results in World Golf Championships ==
Tournament	1999	2000	2001	2002	2003	2004	2005
Match Play	T17	T33		R16	R16	R64	R64
Championship	T4	T5	NT^{1}	T15	T48		
Invitational	T3	T20	T29	T28	T42	T46	

^{1}Cancelled due to 9/11

Top 10
Did not play

QF, R16, R32, R64 = Round in which player lost in match play
"T" = Tied
NT = No tournament

== Team appearances ==
Amateur

- Eisenhower Trophy (representing Rhodesia): 1976

Professional

- World Cup: 1978 (representing South Africa), 1993 (representing Zimbabwe)
- Alfred Dunhill Cup (representing Zimbabwe): 1993, 1994, 1995, 1996, 1997, 1998, 1999, 2000
- Presidents Cup (International Team): 1994, 1996, 1998 (winners), 2000, 2003 (tie), 2013 (non-playing captain), 2015 (non-playing captain), 2017 (non-playing captain)
- Alfred Dunhill Challenge (representing Southern Africa): 1995 (winners)
- Wendy's 3-Tour Challenge (representing Champions Tour): 2007, 2008 (winners), 2009, 2010

== See also ==
- 1982 PGA Tour Qualifying School graduates
- List of golfers with most PGA Tour wins
- List of men's major championships winning golfers
