= 2019 WGC-FedEx St. Jude Invitational =

Tournament information
- Dates: July 25–28, 2019
- Location: Memphis, Tennessee, U.S. 35.057°N 89.779°W
- Course: TPC Southwind
- Tours: PGA Tour; European Tour

Statistics
- Par: 70
- Length: 7,244 yards (6,624 m)
- Field: 63 players
- Cut: None
- Prize fund: $10,250,000
- Winner's share: $1,745,000

Champion
- (United States) Brooks Koepka
- 264 (−16)

Location map
- Location in the United States Location in Tennessee

The 2019 WGC-FedEx St. Jude Invitational was a professional golf tournament held July 25–28 at TPC Southwind in Memphis, Tennessee. It was the 21st WGC Invitational tournament, and the third of the World Golf Championships events in 2019. It was the first time the event had been held in Tennessee, having previously been based at Firestone Country Club in Ohio.

World number one, Brooks Koepka, completed a three-stroke victory over Webb Simpson to win his first World Golf Championship event. Koepka had begun the final day one shot behind Rory McIlroy, who led the field. With the win, Koepka earned more PGA Tour regular season FedEx Cup points than any other player and won first-place prize of $2 million in the Wyndham Rewards Top 10.

== Venue ==
=== Course layout ===
TPC Southwind was designed by Ron Prichard, in consultation with tour pros Hubert Green and Fuzzy Zoeller. TPC Southwind opened thirty-eight years ago in 1988, and is a member of the Tournament Players Club network operated by the PGA Tour.

Hole	Yards	Par	Hole	Yards	Par
1	434	4	10	465	4
2	401	4	11	162	3
3	554	5	12	406	4
4	196	3	13	472	4
5	485	4	14	239	3
6	445	4	15	395	4
7	482	4	16	530	5
8	178	3	17	490	4
9	457	4	18	453	4
Out	3,632	35	In	3,612	35
Source:		Total		7,244	70

== Field ==
The field consisted of players drawn primarily from the Official World Golf Ranking and the winners of the worldwide tournaments with the strongest fields.

1. Playing members of the 2018 United States and European Ryder Cup teams.

Paul Casey (2,3,4), Bryson DeChambeau (2,3,4), Tony Finau (2,3), Tommy Fleetwood (2,3), Sergio García (2,3), Tyrrell Hatton (2,3), Dustin Johnson (2,3,4), Brooks Koepka (2,3,4), Rory McIlroy (2,3,4), Phil Mickelson (2,3,4), Alex Norén (2,3), Thorbjørn Olesen, Ian Poulter (2,3), Jon Rahm (2,3,4), Patrick Reed (2,3), Justin Rose (2,3,4), Webb Simpson (2,3), Jordan Spieth (2,3), Henrik Stenson (2,3), Justin Thomas (2,3,4), Bubba Watson (2,3)

- Rickie Fowler (2,3,4), Francesco Molinari (2,3,4), and Tiger Woods (2,3,4) did not play.

2. The top 50 players from the Official World Golf Ranking as of July 15, 2019.

Keegan Bradley (3,4), Rafa Cabrera-Bello (3), Patrick Cantlay (3,4), Jason Day (3), Matt Fitzpatrick (3), Jim Furyk (3), Justin Harding, Billy Horschel (3), Kevin Kisner (3,4), Matt Kuchar (3,4), Marc Leishman (3,4), Li Haotong (3), Hideki Matsuyama (3), Kevin Na (3,4), Louis Oosthuizen (3), Pan Cheng-tsung (3,4), Eddie Pepperell (3,4), Andrew Putnam (3), Chez Reavie (3,4), Xander Schauffele (3,4), Adam Scott (3), Cameron Smith (3,5), Brandt Snedeker (3,4), Matt Wallace (3), Gary Woodland (3,4)

- Shane Lowry (3,4) and Bernd Wiesberger (3,4) did not play.

3. The top 50 players from the Official World Golf Ranking as of July 22, 2019.

Lucas Bjerregaard (4)

4. Tournament winners, whose victories are considered official, of tournaments from the Federation Tours since the prior season's WGC Invitational with an Official World Golf Ranking Strength of Field Rating of 115 points or more.

Corey Conners, J. B. Holmes, Max Homa, Kodai Ichihara, Kang Sung-hoon, Nate Lashley, Adam Long, Keith Mitchell, Aaron Rai, Kevin Tway, Danny Willett, Matthew Wolff

- Lee Westwood did not play.

5. The winner of selected tournaments from each of the following tours

- Asian Tour: Indonesian Masters (2018) – Poom Saksansin
- PGA Tour of Australasia: Australian PGA Championship (2018) – Cameron Smith, also qualified under categories 2 and 3
- Japan Golf Tour: Bridgestone Open (2018) – Shugo Imahira
- Japan Golf Tour: Japan Golf Tour Championship (2019) – Mikumu Horikawa
- Sunshine Tour: Dimension Data Pro-Am (2019) – Philip Eriksson

== Round summaries ==
=== First round ===
Thursday, July 25, 2019

Place	Player	Score	To par
1	(Spain) Jon Rahm	62	−8
T2	(United States) Patrick Cantlay	65	−5
T2	(Japan) Shugo Imahira	65	−5
T2	(Japan) Hideki Matsuyama	65	−5
T2	(Australia) Cameron Smith	65	−5
T2	(United States) Bubba Watson	65	−5
T7	(England) Tyrrell Hatton	66	−4
T7	(United States) Nate Lashley	66	−4
T7	(Sweden) Alex Norén	66	−4
T7	(England) Ian Poulter	66	−4
T7	(United States) Andrew Putnam	66	−4
T7	(Denmark) Thorbjørn Olesen	66	−4

=== Second round ===
Friday, July 26, 2019

Place	Player	Score	To par
1	(England) Matt Fitzpatrick	67-64=131	−9
T2	(United States) Patrick Cantlay	65-68=133	−7
T2	(United States) Billy Horschel	67-65=133	−7
T2	(Spain) Jon Rahm	62-71=133	−7
T2	(Australia) Cameron Smith	65-68=133	−7
6	(Japan) Shugo Imahira	65-69=134	−6
T7	(United States) Brooks Koepka	68-67=135	−5
T7	(Sweden) Alex Norén	66-69=135	−5
T7	(England) Ian Poulter	66-69=135	−5
T7	(England) Justin Rose	67-68=135	−5
T7	(United States) Webb Simpson	69-66=135	−5
T7	(United States) Bubba Watson	65-70=135	−5

=== Third round ===
Saturday, July 27, 2019

Place	Player	Score	To par
1	(Northern Ireland) Rory McIlroy	69-67-62=198	−12
2	(United States) Brooks Koepka	68-67-64=199	−11
3	(England) Matt Fitzpatrick	67-64-69=200	−10
T4	(Australia) Marc Leishman	69-69-63=201	−9
T4	(Sweden) Alex Norén	66-69-66=201	−9
T4	(Spain) Jon Rahm	62-71-68=201	−9
T7	(United States) Billy Horschel	67-66-69=202	−8
T7	(Denmark) Thorbjørn Olesen	66-71-65=202	−8
T7	(England) Ian Poulter	66-69-67=202	−8
T10	(England) Tommy Fleetwood	68-70-65=203	−7
T10	(United States) Webb Simpson	69-66-68=203	−7
T10	(United States) Justin Thomas	68-69-66=203	−7
T10	(United States) Bubba Watson	65-70-68=203	−7

=== Final round ===
Sunday, July 28, 2019

==== Final leaderboard ====
Champion
(c) = past champion

Place	Player	Score	To par	Money ($)
1	(United States) Brooks Koepka	68-67-64-65=264	−16	1,745,000
2	(United States) Webb Simpson	69-66-68-64=267	−13	1,095,000
3	(Australia) Marc Leishman	69-69-63-67=268	−12	602,000
T4	(England) Matt Fitzpatrick	67-64-69-69=269	−11	384,333
T4	(England) Tommy Fleetwood	68-70-65-66=269	−11	384,333
T4	(Northern Ireland) Rory McIlroy (c)	69-67-62-71=269	−11	384,333
7	(Spain) Jon Rahm	62-71-68-69=270	−10	273,000
8	(England) Ian Poulter	66-69-67-69=271	−9	242,000
T9	(United States) Billy Horschel	67-66-69-70=272	−8	205,000
T9	(United States) Bubba Watson	65-70-68-69=272	−8	205,000

Leaderboard below the top 10
Place	Player	Score	To par	Money ($)
11	(England) Justin Rose	67-68-70-68=273	−7	183,000
T12	(Spain) Rafa Cabrera-Bello	70-71-67-66=274	−6	143,625
T12	(United States) Patrick Cantlay	65-68-73-68=274	−6	143,625
T12	(Sweden) Alex Norén	66-69-66-73=274	−6	143,625
T12	(England) Aaron Rai	72-69-66-67=274	−6	143,625
T12	(United States) Patrick Reed	73-66-67-68=274	−6	143,625
T12	(Australia) Cameron Smith	65-68-73-68=274	−6	143,625
T12	(United States) Jordan Spieth	70-70-66-68=274	−6	143,625
T12	(United States) Justin Thomas (c)	68-69-66-71=274	−6	143,625
T20	(United States) Dustin Johnson (c)	69-69-69-68=275	−5	113,500
T20	(United States) Nate Lashley	66-70-71-68=275	−5	113,500
T20	(China) Li Haotong	69-69-67-70=275	−5	113,500
T20	(South Africa) Louis Oosthuizen	73-69-66-67=275	−5	113,500
T24	(United States) Adam Long	71-70-67-68=276	−4	103,000
T24	(United States) Andrew Putnam	66-71-72-67=276	−4	103,000
T24	(United States) Matthew Wolff	72-70-65-69=276	−4	103,000
T27	(England) Paul Casey	70-71-69-67=277	−3	86,250
T27	(Canada) Corey Conners	67-71-70-69=277	−3	86,250
T27	(United States) Tony Finau	70-71-68-68=277	−3	86,250
T27	(United States) Jim Furyk	74-65-70-68=277	−3	86,250
T27	(Japan) Shugo Imahira	65-69-71-72=277	−3	86,250
T27	(United States) Kevin Kisner	77-67-66-67=277	−3	86,250
T27	(Denmark) Thorbjørn Olesen	66-71-65-75=277	−3	86,250
T27	(United States) Chez Reavie	68-70-68-71=277	−3	86,250
T27	(United States) Xander Schauffele	69-70-69-69=277	−3	86,250
T27	(United States) Brandt Snedeker	69-73-69-66=277	−3	86,250
T27	(Sweden) Henrik Stenson	69-67-72-69=277	−3	86,250
T27	(England) Matt Wallace	70-69-65-73=277	−3	86,250
39	(United States) Keith Mitchell	73-70-71-64=278	−2	76,000
T40	(Australia) Jason Day	72-69-68-70=279	−1	74,000
T40	(Spain) Sergio García	69-71-70-69=279	−1	74,000
T40	(Australia) Adam Scott (c)	70-68-74-67=279	−1	74,000
T43	(South Africa) Justin Harding	72-70-64-74=280	E	70,000
T43	(England) Tyrrell Hatton	66-71-69-74=280	E	70,000
T43	(United States) Matt Kuchar	70-70-71-69=280	E	70,000
T43	(Japan) Hideki Matsuyama (c)	65-71-72-72=280	E	70,000
T43	(United States) Kevin Na	70-66-70-74=280	E	70,000
T48	(United States) Bryson DeChambeau	67-74-72-68=281	+1	66,000
T48	(Taiwan) Pan Cheng-tsung	72-70-70-69=281	+1	66,000
T48	(England) Danny Willett	69-72-70-70=281	+1	66,000
T51	(Denmark) Lucas Bjerregaard	69-74-72-69=284	+4	63,000
T51	(Sweden) Philip Eriksson	73-72-72-67=284	+4	63,000
T51	(England) Eddie Pepperell	70-74-66-74=284	+4	63,000
54	(United States) J. B. Holmes	76-71-68-70=285	+5	61,000
T55	(Japan) Kodai Ichihara	71-70-75-70=286	+6	59,500
T55	(United States) Gary Woodland	73-71-70-72=286	+6	59,500
57	(United States) Phil Mickelson	68-73-73-74=288	+8	58,000
T58	(Japan) Mikumu Horikawa	75-77-66-72=290	+10	56,500
T58	(Thailand) Poom Saksansin	68-73-75-74=290	+10	56,500
60	(South Korea) Kang Sung-hoon	69-75-73-74=291	+11	55,000
T61	(United States) Keegan Bradley (c)	74-78-65-75=292	+12	53,500
T61	(United States) Max Homa	74-73-77-68=292	+12	53,500
63	(United States) Kevin Tway	76-77-74-70=297	+17	52,000

==== Scorecard ====
Hole	1	2	3	4	5	6	7	8	9	10	11	12	13	14	15	16	17	18
Par	4	4	5	3	4	4	4	3	4	4	3	4	4	3	4	5	4	4
(United States) Koepka	−11	−11	−12	−12	−13	−14	−14	−14	−14	−15	−15	−15	−15	−15	−15	−15	−16	−16
(United States) Simpson	−7	−7	−9	−9	−9	−10	−10	−10	−9	−10	−11	−11	−12	−12	−12	−13	−13	−13
(Australia) Leishman	−9	−9	−9	−9	−9	−9	−9	−9	−9	−10	−11	−12	−11	−12	−11	−12	−12	−12
(England) Fitzpatrick	−10	−10	−10	−10	−10	−10	−9	−9	−10	−10	−10	−11	−10	−9	−9	−11	−11	−11
(England) Fleetwood	−8	−8	−9	−9	−8	−8	−8	−8	−9	−9	−9	−9	−9	−10	−10	−11	−11	−11
(Northern Ireland) McIlroy	−12	−12	−12	−12	−12	−12	−12	−12	−12	−12	−12	−11	−11	−12	−11	−11	−11	−11
(Spain) Rahm	−9	−9	−10	−10	−10	−11	−11	−11	−11	−11	−10	−10	−11	−10	−10	−10	−10	−10

Cumulative tournament scores, relative to par

Eagle	Birdie	Bogey
