= Schauffele =

Schauffele is a German surname, meaning "man with a small shovel". Notable people with this surname include:

- Richard Schauffele (1903 – 1983), a German football player
- Xander Schauffele (born 1993), an American golfer
