= Chris Como =

American golf instructor

Chris Como (born c. 1980) is an American golf instructor known for integrating biomechanics and sports science into golf coaching. He has worked with several prominent PGA Tour players, including Tiger Woods, Bryson DeChambeau, and Xander Schauffele. Como is recognized for his data-driven approach to swing analysis and player development.

== Early life and education ==
Como was raised in Southern California. He pursued graduate-level studies in biomechanics at Texas Woman’s University, where he conducted research in sports biomechanics. He apprenticed under several prominent instructors, including David Leadbetter, Mac O’Grady, and Hank Haney.

== Coaching career ==
=== Tiger Woods ===
In 2014, Como was hired as a swing consultant for Tiger Woods. The New York Times described Como as a "quiet, thoughtful instructor" whose scientific approach and years of biomechanical study made him a unique fit for Woods. Como worked with Woods as he sought to rebuild his swing following injuries and surgeries, focusing on adapting technique to Woods’s physical limitations. During tournaments, Como could be seen walking inside the ropes with Woods, offering on-course advice and technical suggestions. The partnership ended in late 2017, with Woods opting to coach himself thereafter.

=== Bryson DeChambeau ===
Como began working with Bryson DeChambeau in 2019, helping him increase clubhead speed and power through biomechanical techniques and strength training. This partnership was instrumental in DeChambeau’s victory at the 2020 U.S. Open.

=== Xander Schauffele ===
Como started coaching Xander Schauffele in late 2023. Under his guidance, Schauffele won the 2024 PGA Championship and the 2024 Open Championship.

=== Other students ===
Como has also coached Jason Day, Tony Finau, Si Woo Kim, Kurt Kitayama, Jamie Lovemark, Aaron Baddeley, Trevor Immelman, and Pierson Coody.

== Coaching philosophy ==
Como is known for his use of biomechanics, force-plate analysis, and motion-capture technology to tailor instruction to the individual needs of players. He emphasizes a scientific approach to swing mechanics, combining data analysis with traditional coaching techniques.

== Instructional work ==
Como has hosted coaching series on Golf Channel and GolfPass, including Swing Expedition with Chris Como and Como Concepts. He is the Director of Instruction at Dallas National Golf Club and owns the Como Coaching Academy at The Nelson in Dallas, Texas.

== Recognition ==
Como has been named among Golf Magazine’s Top 100 Teachers since 2013. He has also been included in Golf Digest’s Top 50 Teachers in multiple years.
