= 2023 Ryder Cup =

Men's golf competition between the United States and Europe

44th Ryder Cup Matches
- Dates: 29 September – 1 October 2023
- Venue: Marco Simone Golf and Country Club
- Location: Guidonia Montecelio, Metropolitan City of Rome Capital, Italy
- Captains: Luke Donald (Note: Luke Donald replaced Henrik Stenson, who was relieved of the captaincy due to joining LIV Golf.) (Europe); Zach Johnson (USA)
(Europe)	16 1/2	11 1/2	(United States)
- Europe wins the Ryder Cup

Location map
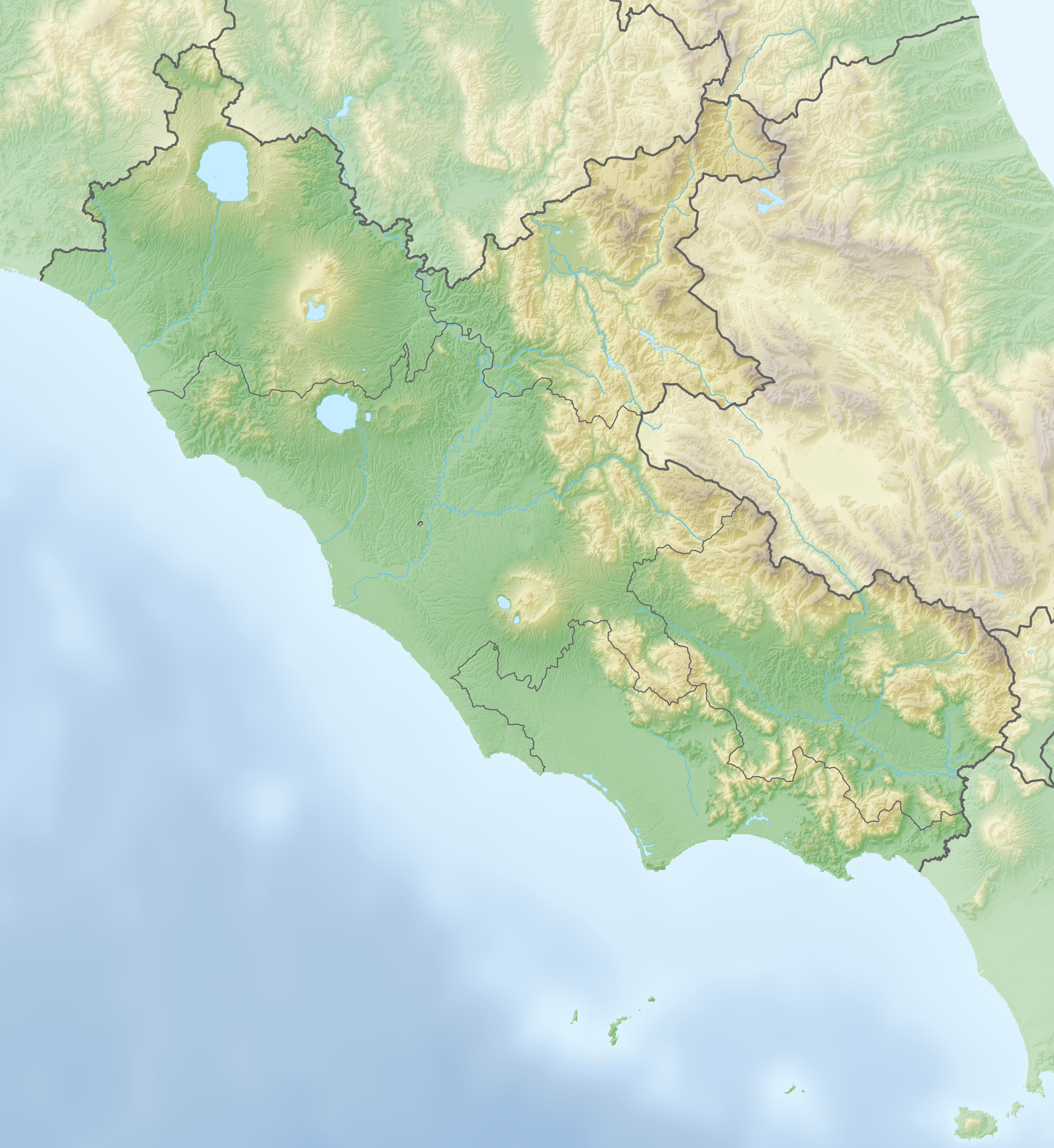
- Location in Italy Location in Lazio Marco Simone G&CC (Rome)

The 44th Ryder Cup was a series of golf matches between teams representing the DP World Tour (Europe) and the PGA of America (United States) for the Ryder Cup, that was held in Italy from 29 September to 1 October 2023 at Marco Simone Golf and Country Club in Guidonia Montecelio, northeast of Rome. The biennial event was originally scheduled for 2022, before the 43rd matches were postponed into 2021 due to the COVID-19 pandemic.

The team captains were Luke Donald for Europe and Zach Johnson for the United States; Donald replaced Henrik Stenson, who was removed from the role by the European Tour after joining LIV Golf. Each team of twelve players was made up of six automatic qualifiers and six captain's picks. The top thirteen players in the Official World Golf Ranking played in the event, the first time the entire top ten had done so since the inauguration of the rankings in 1986. The matches were contested with four foursomes and four fourball matches on each of the first two days, with twelve singles matches on Sunday. Europe went into the matches undefeated in Europe since 1993; they required 14 1/2 to regain the trophy they last won in 2018; as holder of the trophy, having won in 2021, the USA needed 14 points to retain it.

In the opening foursomes matches on Friday morning, Europe secured a clean sweep to jump into a 4–0 lead. In the fourballs in the afternoon, the USA were unable to hold onto leads in several of the matches and fell further behind as Europe went into day two ahead, 6 1/2–1 1/2. On Saturday morning, Max Homa and Brian Harman won the USA their first match of the event, but with Europe winning the remaining three foursomes, including a record 9 and 7 victory for Viktor Hovland and rookie Ludvig Åberg over world number one Scottie Scheffler and PGA champion Brooks Koepka, the lead was extended to 9 1/2–2 1/2. In the afternoon fourballs, the USA won their first session to cut the deficit to 5 points, at 10 1/2–5 1/2.

On Sunday, Europe secured the first point as Hovland defeated Collin Morikawa; another half point came when Jon Rahm tied his match with Scheffler by winning the 18th hole. When Rory McIlroy and Tyrrell Hatton won their matches, Europe required just half a point from the remaining seven matches out on the course. The next four matches to finish all went to Team USA. Europe's victory was ensured when Tommy Fleetwood won the 16th hole to go dormie two up against Rickie Fowler; Fleetwood won the 17th hole to confirm the win for Team Europe. A win for Robert MacIntyre over U.S. Open champion Wyndham Clark in match twelve, and a tie for Shane Lowry against Jordan Spieth brought the final score to 16 1/2–11 1/2.

== Host selection ==
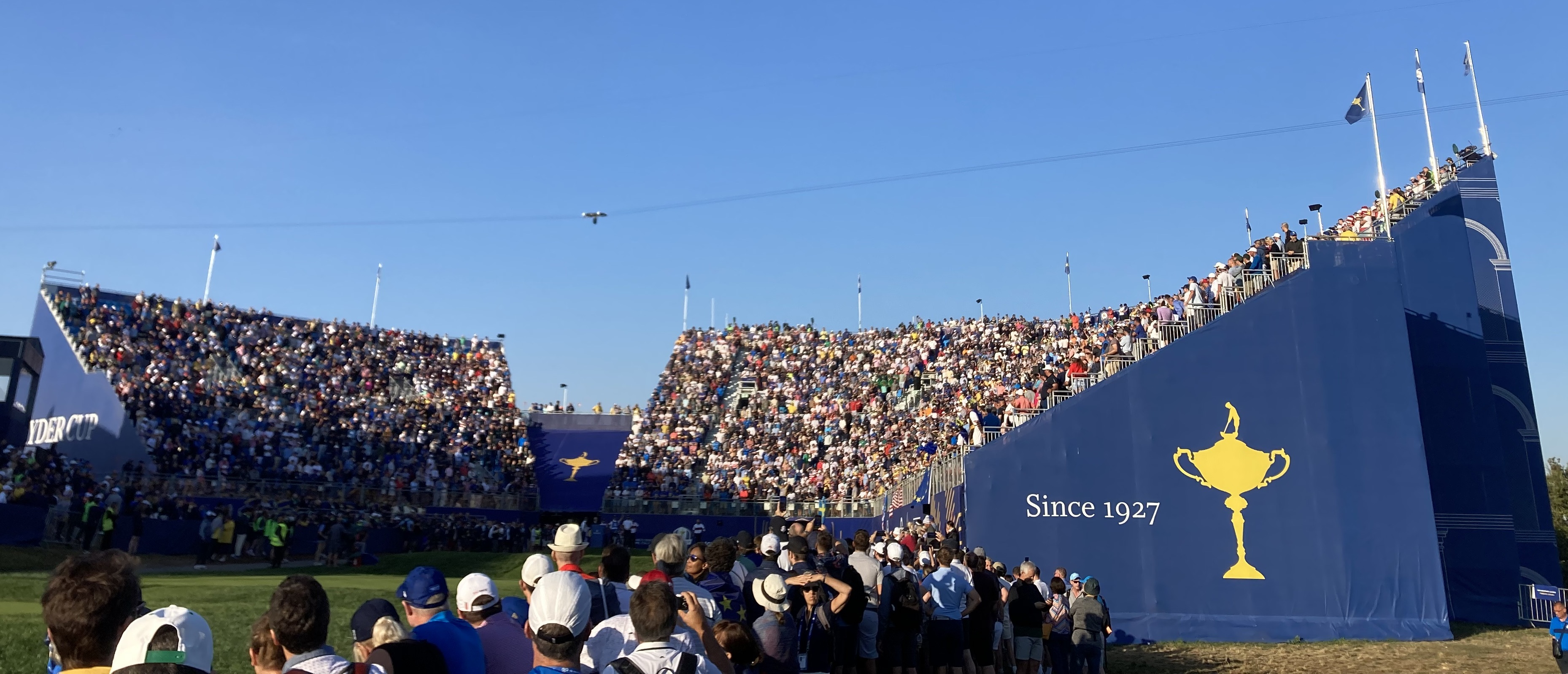
The First Tee Grandstand amphitheatre on the 2023 Ryder Cup Course which held approximately 5,000 spectators.

The bidding process for the 44th edition of Ryder Cup opened on 23 June 2014. Countries had until 31 August to formally express an interest. These expressions had to come either from a central government or a national golf governing body. On 14 December 2015, Rome was announced as the host of 44th Ryder Cup. Italy beat Germany, Austria and Spain to win the bid.

Bidding locations

Country	Nearest city	Golf course	Ref
Austria	Vienna	Golf Club Fontana	
Germany	Berlin	Golf Club Bad Saarow	
Italy	Rome	Marco Simone Golf and Country Club	
Spain	Girona	PGA Catalunya Resort	

Declared an interest but did not enter an official bid

Country	Reason of withdrawal	Ref
Denmark	Unspecified	
Portugal	The "prevailing economic environment"	
Turkey	Required up to 15,000 trees to be cut down to accommodate grandstands at its chosen course	

== Format ==
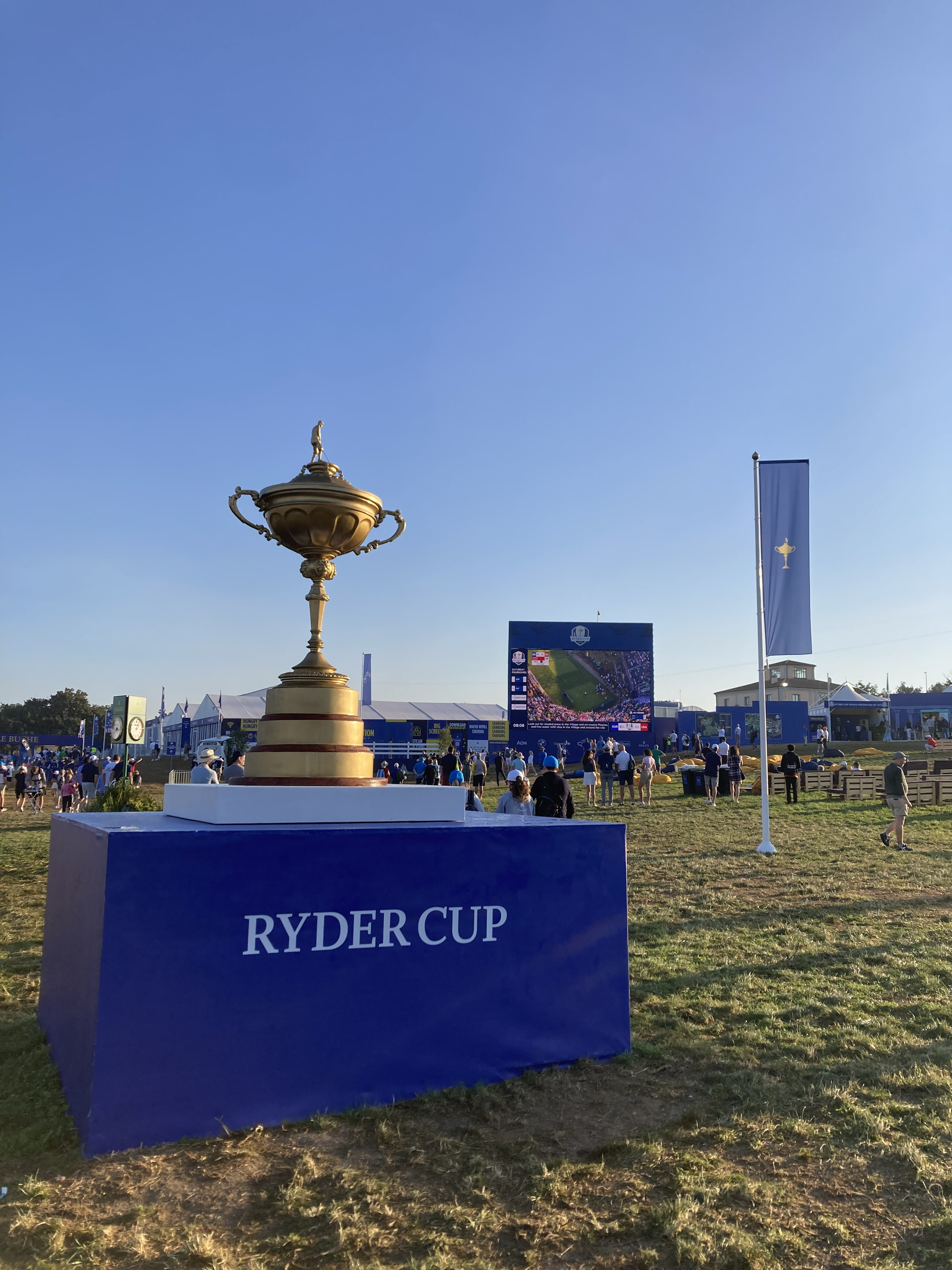
An enlarged model of the Ryder Cup in the fan village.

The Ryder Cup is a match play event, with each match worth one point. The competition format is as follows:

- Day 1 (Friday) – 4 foursome (alternate shot) matches and 4 fourball (better ball) matches
- Day 2 (Saturday) – 4 foursome matches and 4 fourball matches
- Day 3 (Sunday) – 12 singles matches

On the first two days there are 4 foursome matches and 4 fourball matches with the home captain choosing which are played in the morning and which in the afternoon.

With a total of 28 points available, 14 1/2 points are required to win the Cup, and 14 points are required for the defending champion to retain the Cup. All matches are played to a maximum of 18 holes.

=== Team selection ===
==== Europe ====
The European team qualification rules were announced on 30 August 2022. There were several changes from the previous Ryder Cup, with three qualifiers from each of the European and World points lists and the number of captain's picks increased from three to six; the weighting of points was also changed, with highest ranked events now worth 4 times the lowest, having been six times the value previously.

On 9 August 2023, Masters Champion Jon Rahm and Rory McIlroy were confirmed after securing their spots via the European points list. On 15 August 2023, Viktor Hovland qualified via the World points list. On 27 August 2023, Tyrrell Hatton qualified via the World points list. The final automatic qualifiers were confirmed on 3 September 2023, at the conclusion of Omega European Masters, as Robert MacIntyre, via the European points list, and Matt Fitzpatrick via the World points list. Luke Donald announced his six captain's picks the following day; they were Tommy Fleetwood, Sepp Straka, Justin Rose, Shane Lowry, Nicolai Højgaard, and Ludvig Åberg, who won the final qualifying event and had been a professional for less than three months.

The leading players in the final points lists were:

European points list
Position	Name	Points
1	Rory McIlroy (Q)	4033.5
2	Jon Rahm (Q)	3417.2
3	Robert MacIntyre (Q)	1838.2
4	Yannik Paul	1731.8
5	Adrian Meronk	1656.0
6	Victor Perez	1571.0
7	Tommy Fleetwood (P)	1534.4
8	Rasmus Højgaard	1531.9
9	Adrián Otaegui	1444.8
10	Alexander Björk	1401.4
11	Shane Lowry (P)	1290.2
12	Joost Luiten	1274.0
13	Jordan Smith	1258.9
14	Jorge Campillo	1253.6
15	Tyrrell Hatton (q)	1253.0
...		
18	Viktor Hovland (q)	1176.3
...		
23	Matt Fitzpatrick (q)	972.9
...		
25	Nicolai Højgaard (P)	942.1
...		
45	Sepp Straka (P)	613.2
...		
60	Ludvig Åberg (P)	500.4
...		
94	Justin Rose (P)	304.0

World points list
Position	Name	Points
1	Rory McIlroy (q)	404.8
2	Jon Rahm (q)	395.4
3	Viktor Hovland (Q)	357.0
4	Tyrrell Hatton (Q)	205.6
5	Matt Fitzpatrick (Q)	191.1
6	Tommy Fleetwood (P)	186.9
7	Sepp Straka (P)	152.4
8	Shane Lowry (P)	105.2
9	Justin Rose (P)	100.3
10	Robert MacIntyre (q)	96.4
11	Adrian Meronk	76.4
12	Alex Norén	72.6
13	Séamus Power	71.3
14	Thomas Detry	69.6
15	Victor Perez	69.1
16	Nicolai Højgaard (P)	62.1
...		
58	Ludvig Åberg (P)	23.9

Players in qualifying places (Q) are shown in green; captain's picks (P) are shown in yellow; those in italics (q) qualified through the other points list.

==== United States ====
The United States qualification rules were confirmed along with the announcement of Johnson as captain on 28 February 2022. There was no change from the amended selection process used for the previous Ryder Cup, with six players qualifying from the Ryder Cup points list and six captain's picks.

Points were awarded as follows:

- 2022 major championships, 1 point per $1,000 earned.
- 2022 World Golf Championship events and The Players Championship, 1 point per $2,000 earned.
- 2023 major championships (double points for the winner, 1.5 times points for those who made the cut).
- 2023 PGA Tour events; 1 point per $1,000 earned at standard PGA Tour events, including the Zurich Classic of New Orleans and WGC events, through the BMW Championship. No points were awarded in "alternate" events.

World number one Scottie Scheffler and U.S. Open champion Wyndham Clark secured their qualification in advance of the BMW Championship. Open Champion Brian Harman, Patrick Cantlay, Max Homa and Xander Schauffele were the remaining four qualifiers. The six captain's picks were announced on 29 August 2023, two days after the conclusion of the Tour Championship; they were PGA champion Brooks Koepka, Jordan Spieth, Collin Morikawa, Sam Burns, Rickie Fowler and Justin Thomas. The leading 15 players in the final points list after the final qualifying event, the BMW Championship, were as follows:

Position	Name	Points
1	Scottie Scheffler (Q)	27,617.74
2	Wyndham Clark (Q)	13,738.92
3	Brian Harman (Q)	11,100.54
4	Patrick Cantlay (Q)	10,946.75
5	Max Homa (Q)	9,638.76
6	Xander Schauffele (Q)	9,450.27
7	Brooks Koepka (P)	9,421.15
8	Jordan Spieth (P)	8,188.33
9	Cameron Young	8,127.31
10	Collin Morikawa (P)	7,638.23
11	Keegan Bradley	7,642.97
12	Sam Burns (P)	7,334.70
13	Rickie Fowler (P)	7,116.24
14	Denny McCarthy	6,761.27
15	Justin Thomas (P)	6,539.20

Players in qualifying places (Q) are shown in green; captain's picks (P) are shown in yellow.

== Teams ==
=== Captains ===
Both team captains were announced in early 2022; Zach Johnson was named as the U.S. team captain on 28 February, and Henrik Stenson as the European team captain on 15 March. Stenson was removed from the role in July 2022 due to his decision to join LIV Golf. On 1 August 2022, Luke Donald was announced as the new captain of the European team.

=== Vice captains ===
For the European team, Thomas Bjørn and Edoardo Molinari were named by Stenson as vice captains. They were retained as vice-captains by Donald. In November 2022, Donald named Nicolas Colsaerts as the team's third vice-captain. On 2 August 2023, José María Olazábal was named the fourth vice-captain. On 16 August 2023, Francesco Molinari was named the fifth and final vice-captain.

For the U.S. team, Steve Stricker was named as the first vice-captain. On 17 January 2023, Davis Love III was named as the second vice-captain. On 8 May 2023, Jim Furyk was named as the third vice-captain. On 10 May 2023, Fred Couples was named as the fourth vice-captain. On 31 July 2023, Stewart Cink was named the fifth and final vice-captain.

=== Players ===
Europe team
Name	Country	Age	Points rank (European)	Points rank (World)	World ranking	Previous Ryder Cups	Matches	Record	Win percentage
Rory McIlroy	Northern Ireland	34	1	1	2	6	28	12–12–4	50.00
Jon Rahm	Spain	28	2	2	3	2	8	4–3–1	56.25
Robert MacIntyre	Scotland	27	3	10	55	0	Rookie		
Viktor Hovland	Norway	26	18	3	4	1	5	0–3–2	20.00
Tyrrell Hatton	England	31	15	4	11	2	7	2–4–1	35.71
Matt Fitzpatrick	England	29	23	5	8	2	5	0–5–0	00.00
Tommy Fleetwood (P)	England	32	7	6	13	2	8	4–2–2	62.50
Sepp Straka (P)	Austria	30	45	7	22	0	Rookie		
Justin Rose (P)	England	43	94	9	37	5	23	13–8–2	60.87
Shane Lowry (P)	Ireland	36	11	8	34	1	3	1–2–0	33.33
Nicolai Højgaard (P)	Denmark	22	25	16	82	0	Rookie		
Ludvig Åberg (P)	Sweden	23	60	58	80	0	Rookie		

United States team
Name	Age	Points rank	World ranking	Previous Ryder Cups	Matches	Record	Win percentage
Scottie Scheffler	27	1	1	1	3	2–0–1	83.33
Wyndham Clark	29	2	10	0	Rookie		
Brian Harman	36	3	9	0	Rookie		
Patrick Cantlay	31	4	5	1	4	3–0–1	87.50
Max Homa	32	5	7	0	Rookie		
Xander Schauffele	29	6	6	1	4	3–1–0	75.00
Brooks Koepka (P)	33	7	17	3	12	6–5–1	54.17
Jordan Spieth (P)	30	8	12	4	18	8–7–3	52.78
Collin Morikawa (P)	26	10	19	1	4	3–0–1	87.50
Sam Burns (P)	27	12	20	0	Rookie		
Rickie Fowler (P)	34	13	25	4	15	3–7–5	36.67
Justin Thomas (P)	30	15	24	2	9	6–2–1	72.22

Captain's picks (P) are shown in yellow. World rankings and match records are prior to the start of the 2023 Ryder Cup.

== Course ==
Hole	Yards	Metres	Par	Hole	Yards	Metres	Par
1	445	407	4	10	455	416	4
2	476	435	4	11	330	302	4
3	453	414	4	12	554	507	5
4	185	169	3	13	145	133	3
5	376	344	4	14	495	453	4
6	383	350	4	15	478	437	4
7	219	200	3	16	352	322	4
8	503	460	4	17	206	188	3
9	587	537	5	18	626	572	5
Out	3,627	3,316	35	In	3,641	3,330	36
Source:				Total	7,268	6,646	71

== Event summary ==
=== Friday's matches ===
The opening round of four foursomes matches started at 7:35 am local time. Pairings were announced at the Opening Ceremony on Thursday. The first point was won by Europe, with Jon Rahm and Tyrrell Hatton winning, 4 and 3, against Scottie Scheffler and Sam Burns. Europe continued their strong start winning the 2nd point with Viktor Hovland and debutant Ludvig Åberg winning, 4 and 3, against Max Homa and Brian Harman.

Further success for Europe came from Shane Lowry and another debutant, Sepp Straka, winning 2 and 1, over Rickie Fowler and Collin Morikawa. A first session whitewash for Europe was confirmed with Rory McIlroy and Tommy Fleetwood winning, 2 and 1, against Xander Schauffele and Patrick Cantlay.

It was the first time in Ryder Cup history that the European team had a 4–0 lead after the first session.

	Results
Rahm/Hatton	(Europe) 4 & 3	Scheffler/Burns
Åberg/Hovland	(Europe) 4 & 3	Homa/Harman
Lowry/Straka	(Europe) 2 & 1	Fowler/Morikawa
McIlroy/Fleetwood	(Europe) 2 & 1	Schauffele/Cantlay
4	Session	0
4	Overall	0

The opening round of four fourballs matches started at 12:25 pm local time. Pairings were announced towards the end of the morning foursome matches. The first match between Justin Thomas, Jordan Spieth and Hovland and Hatton was halved giving the Americans their first half point but Europe remained up 4 1/2–1/2. In the fourth overall match, McIlroy and Matt Fitzpatrick were dominant in their match making 8 birdies and an eagle to win their match 5 and 3, giving the Europeans a 5 1/2–1/2 lead. In the second overall match, Scheffler and Brooks Koepka halved their match with Rahm and Nicolai Højgaard, giving Europe an overall lead of 6–1. In the third overall match, Justin Rose and Robert MacIntyre won their final two holes to halve their match with Homa and Wyndham Clark, which gave the European side a 6 1/2–1 1/2 lead heading into the weekend play.

It was the first time that the United States failed to win a single match in a day in Ryder Cup history.

	Results
Hovland/Hatton	halved	Thomas/Spieth
Rahm/Højgaard	halved	Scheffler/Koepka
MacIntyre/Rose	halved	Homa/Clark
McIlroy/Fitzpatrick	(Europe) 5 & 3	Morikawa/Schauffele
2 1/2	Session	1 1/2
6 1/2	Overall	1 1/2

=== Saturday's matches ===
The foursomes matches for Saturday were announced Friday night after the completion of day 1.

In the second match, Åberg and Hovland defeated Scheffler and Koepka 9 and 7, the biggest victory in an 18-hole match in Ryder Cup history.

At the end of day 2, Europe held a 10 1/2–5 1/2 lead going into Sunday's 12 singles and no side has come from five back to win in the event's 96-year history.

	Results
McIlroy/Fleetwood	(Europe) 2 & 1	Thomas/Spieth
Åberg/Hovland	(Europe) 9 & 7	Scheffler/Koepka
Lowry/Straka	(United States) 4 & 2	Homa/Harman
Rahm/Hatton	(Europe) 2 & 1	Schauffele/Cantlay
3	Session	1
9 1/2	Overall	2 1/2

	Results
Hovland/Åberg	(United States) 4 & 3	Burns/Morikawa
Fleetwood/Højgaard	(United States) 2 & 1	Homa/Harman
Rose/MacIntyre	(Europe) 3 & 2	Thomas/Spieth
Fitzpatrick/McIlroy	(United States) 1 up	Cantlay/Clark
1	Session	3
10 1/2	Overall	5 1/2

=== Sunday's matches ===
The singles match-ups were announced on Saturday evening, with both captains sending out their highest ranked players early. The first match to finish was match two, with Viktor Hovland defeating Collin Morikawa, 4 and 3. The first match between Jon Rahm and Scottie Scheffler was close throughout, with Rahm winning the last hole to tie. Match four was next to finish, as Rory McIlroy defeated Sam Burns, 3 and 1. In match three, Patrick Cantlay won the first US point of the singles, defeating Justin Rose, 2 and 1. When Tyrrell Hatton defeated Brian Harman, 3 and 2 in match six, Europe had moved onto 14 points and needed half a point more to win the Ryder Cup.

In match five, Matt Fitzpatrick missed a putt on the final hole to tie his match to Max Homa. Matches seven though nine all went the way of the US with Brooks Koepka, Justin Thomas and Xander Schauffele all winning, to take the overall score to 14–11. When Rickie Fowler conceded Tommy Fleetwood's short putt on the 16th, having earlier hit his own tee shot into the water, to go dormie two down in match eleven, Europe were guaranteed the half-point they needed to win. Very shortly afterwards, in match ten, Shane Lowry guaranteed another half point for Europe as he went 1 up through 17 holes against Jordan Spieth. Fleetwood won the 17th hole to win his match 3 and 1, and confirm the victory for Europe. In match twelve, Robert MacIntyre, who had led Wyndham Clark by three holes before being pulled back to all-square, won the 15th and 16th holes before tying the 17th to win 2 and 1. In the last match to finish, Spieth won the 18th hole to tie with Lowry, and make the final score 16 1/2–11 1/2 to Europe.

Europe and the USA tied the singles matches, each winning five with two tied matches.

	Results		Timetable
Jon Rahm	halved	Scottie Scheffler	2nd: 12–6
Viktor Hovland	(Europe) 4 & 3	Collin Morikawa	1st: 11 1/2–5 1/2
Justin Rose	(United States) 2 & 1	Patrick Cantlay	3rd: 12–7
Rory McIlroy	(Europe) 3 & 1	Sam Burns	4th: 13–7
Matt Fitzpatrick	(United States) 1 up	Max Homa	7th: 14–9
Tyrrell Hatton	(Europe) 3 & 2	Brian Harman	5th: 14–7
Ludvig Åberg	(United States) 3 & 2	Brooks Koepka	6th: 14–8
Sepp Straka	(United States) 2 up	Justin Thomas	9th: 14–11
Nicolai Højgaard	(United States) 3 & 2	Xander Schauffele	8th: 14–10
Shane Lowry	halved	Jordan Spieth	12th: 16 1/2–11 1/2
Tommy Fleetwood	(Europe) 3 & 1	Rickie Fowler	10th: 15–11
Robert MacIntyre	(Europe) 2 & 1	Wyndham Clark	11th: 16–11
6	Session	6
16 1/2	Overall	11 1/2

== Individual player records ==
Each entry refers to the win–loss–tie record of the player.

=== Europe ===
Player	Points	Matches	Overall	Singles	Foursomes	Fourballs
Ludvig Åberg	2	4	2–2–0	0–1–0	2–0–0	0–1–0
Matt Fitzpatrick	1	3	1–2–0	0–1–0	0–0–0	1–1–0
Tommy Fleetwood	3	4	3–1–0	1–0–0	2–0–0	0–1–0
Tyrrell Hatton	3.5	4	3–0–1	1–0–0	2–0–0	0–0–1
Nicolai Højgaard	0.5	3	0–2–1	0–1–0	0–0–0	0–1–1
Viktor Hovland	3.5	5	3–1–1	1–0–0	2–0–0	0–1–1
Shane Lowry	1.5	3	1–1–1	0–0–1	1–1–0	0–0–0
Robert MacIntyre	2.5	3	2–0–1	1–0–0	0–0–0	1–0–1
Rory McIlroy	4	5	4–1–0	1–0–0	2–0–0	1–1–0
Jon Rahm	3	4	2–0–2	0–0–1	2–0–0	0–0–1
Justin Rose	1.5	3	1–1–1	0–1–0	0–0–0	1–0–1
Sepp Straka	1	3	1–2–0	0–1–0	1–1–0	0–0–0

=== United States ===
Player	Points	Matches	Overall	Singles	Foursomes	Fourballs
Sam Burns	1	3	1–2–0	0–1–0	0–1–0	1–0–0
Patrick Cantlay	2	4	2–2–0	1–0–0	0–2–0	1–0–0
Wyndham Clark	1.5	3	1–1–1	0–1–0	0–0–0	1–0–1
Rickie Fowler	0	2	0–2–0	0–1–0	0–1–0	0–0–0
Brian Harman	2	4	2–2–0	0–1–0	1–1–0	1–0–0
Max Homa	3.5	5	3–1–1	1–0–0	1–1–0	1–0–1
Brooks Koepka	1.5	3	1–1–1	1–0–0	0–1–0	0–0–1
Collin Morikawa	1	4	1–3–0	0–1–0	0–1–0	1–1–0
Xander Schauffele	1	4	1–3–0	1–0–0	0–2–0	0–1–0
Scottie Scheffler	1	4	0–2–2	0–0–1	0–2–0	0–0–1
Jordan Spieth	1	4	0–2–2	0–0–1	0–1–0	0–1–1
Justin Thomas	1.5	4	1–2–1	1–0–0	0–1–0	0–1–1

== Broadcast ==
The 2023 Ryder Cup was televised in the United States by USA Network, NBC and on NBC streaming site Peacock. In the United Kingdom and Ireland, the event was broadcast by Sky Sports and in streaming on Sky Go, with radio coverage on BBC Radio 5 Live. In France, the 2023 Ryder Cup was broadcast on Canal+ Sport (and on Canal+ for the last day) and in streaming on MyCANAL. In Italy, it was live broadcast on Sky Sport Italia and on streaming on Sky Go. In Canada, the 2023 Ryder Cup media rights are owned by Bell Media and broadcast on TSN and RDS.
