= Nicolai Højgaard =

Danish professional golfer (born 2001)

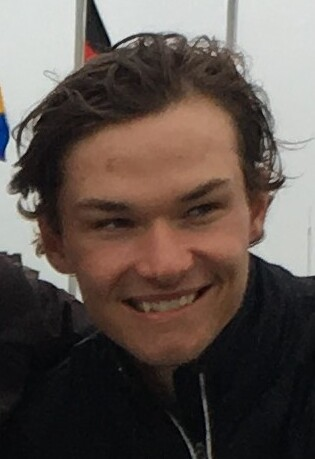
- Højgaard in 2018

Personal information
- Nationality: Denmark
- Born: 12 March 2001 (age 25) Billund, Denmark
- Height: 6 ft 2 in (188 cm)
- Weight: 193 lb (88 kg)

Career
- Sport: Golf
- Turned professional: 2019
- Current tours: European Tour; PGA Tour
- Former tour: Challenge Tour
- Professional wins: 4
- Highest ranking: 28 (17 May 2026) (as of 25 October 2026)

Number of wins by tour
- European Tour: 3
- Other: 1

Best results in major championships
- Masters Tournament: T16: 2024
- PGA Championship: T41: 2025
- U.S. Open: T50: 2024
- The Open Championship: T14: 2025

Nicolai Højgaard (born 12 March 2001) is a Danish professional golfer who currently plays on the PGA Tour and European Tour. In 2021, he and his twin brother, Rasmus, became the first brothers to win in back-to-back weeks on the European Tour. He also was part of the winning European 2023 Ryder Cup team.

== Amateur career ==
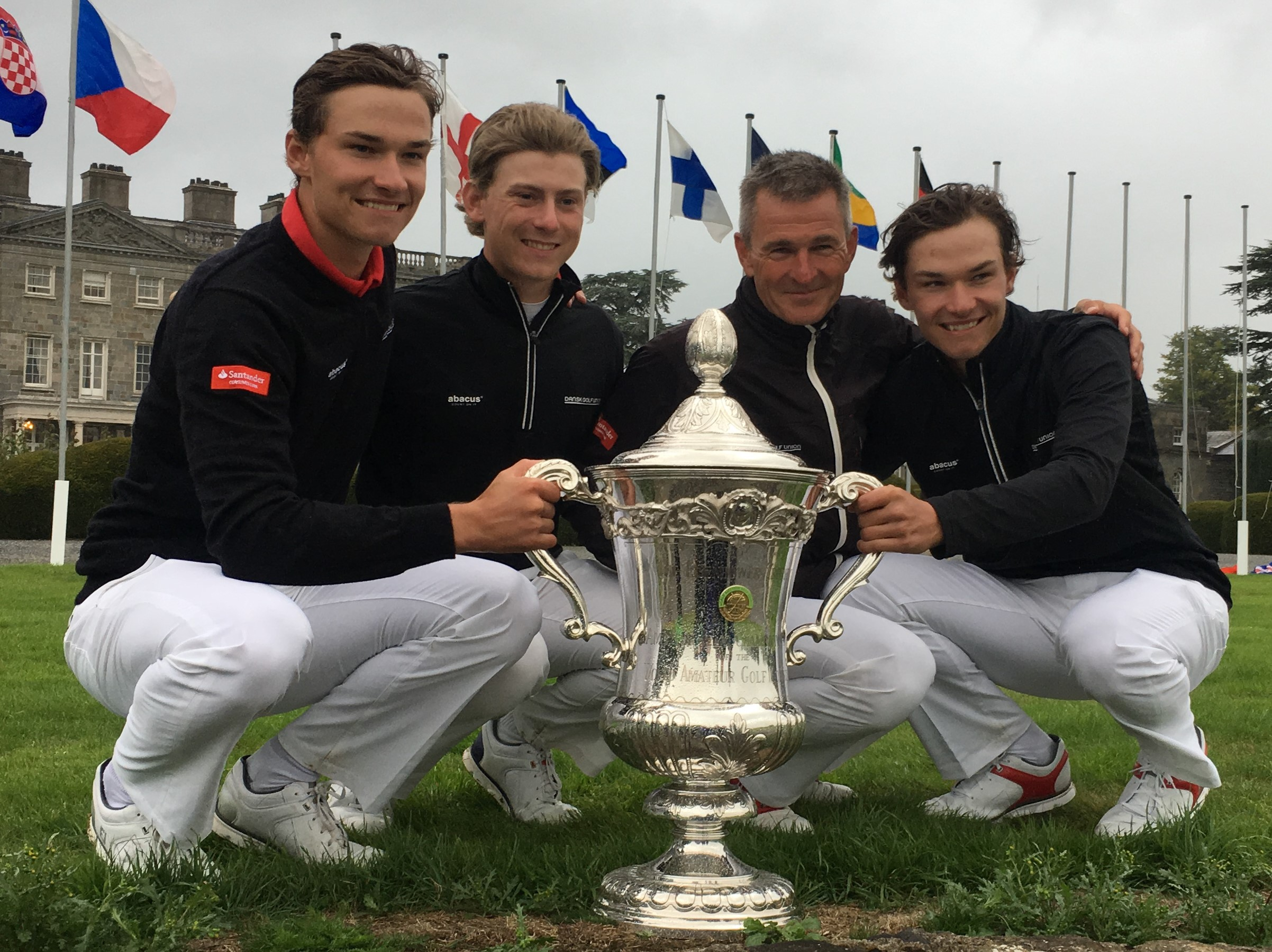
2018 Eisenhower Trophy in Ireland. The winning Danish team: Rasmus Højgaard, John Axelsen, Torben Nyehuus (captain), and Nicolai

Højgaard was part of the Danish team that won the 2017 European Boys Team Championship, beating the hosts Spain in the final.

Højgaard had a successful 2018. In April he won a professional tournament, the Bravo Tours Open on the Nordic Golf League. In June he was second in the individual competition for the boys Toyota Junior World Cup, four strokes behind his brother Rasmus. Denmark also won the team competition. Two weeks later he won the European Amateur, a win that gained him an entry to the 2018 Open Championship. In September he was part of the Danish team that won the 2018 Eisenhower Trophy for the first time. He played for Europe in the Junior Ryder Cup later in September and in October he represented Denmark in the Youth Olympic Games.

== Professional career ==
Højgaard turned professional at the start of 2019. He played a mixture of Nordic Golf League and Challenge Tour events for most of the season. In September he was runner-up in the KLM Open, a European Tour event, one stroke behind Sergio García.

In September 2021, Højgaard won his first European Tour event at the DS Automobiles Italian Open winning by one shot ahead of Tommy Fleetwood and Adrian Meronk. His twin brother Rasmus had won the week before at the Omega European Masters, meaning that the Højgaard twins became the first brothers to win in back-to-back weeks on the European Tour.

Højgaard picked up his second European Tour victory in February 2022 at the Ras Al Khaimah Championship. He shot 24 under par for four rounds, beating Jordan Smith by four shots.

In September 2023, Højgaard played on the European team in the 2023 Ryder Cup at Marco Simone Golf and Country Club in Guidonia, Rome, Italy. The European team won 16.5–11.5 and Højgaard went 0–2–1 including a loss in his Sunday singles match against Xander Schauffele. In November, he won the DP World Tour Championship at Jumeirah Golf Estates in Dubai. He shot a final round 64 to win by two shots and claim his first Rolex Series victory.

In April 2024, Højgaard played in his first ever Masters Tournament. Playing alongside the world number one Scottie Scheffler on Saturday, he briefly took the solo lead with a birdie on the tenth hole before finished up the round with five straight bogeys. He finished the tournament tied for 16th.

== Personal life ==
Højgaard's twin brother Rasmus is a professional golfer and was also part of the Danish team that won the 2018 Eisenhower Trophy.

== Amateur wins ==
- 2016 Hovborg Kro Open
- 2017 DGU Elite Tour I Herrer
- 2018 Hovborg Kro Open, European Amateur

== Professional wins (4) ==
=== European Tour wins (3) ===
Legend
Tour Championships (1)
Rolex Series (1) (Note: The DP World Tour Championship is also a Rolex Series tournament.)
Other European Tour (2)

No.	Date	Tournament	Winning score	Margin of victory	Runner(s)-up
1	5 Sep 2021	DS Automobiles Italian Open	−13 (66-69-65-71=271)	1 stroke	(England) Tommy Fleetwood, (Poland) Adrian Meronk
2	6 Feb 2022	Ras Al Khaimah Championship	−24 (67-65-64-68=264)	4 strokes	(England) Jordan Smith
3	19 Nov 2023	DP World Tour Championship	−21 (67-66-70-64=267)	2 strokes	(England) Tommy Fleetwood, (Norway) Viktor Hovland, (England) Matt Wallace

=== Nordic Golf League wins (1) ===
No.	Date	Tournament	Winning score	Margin of victory	Runner-up
1	27 Apr 2018	Bravo Tours Open (as an amateur)	−5 (72-74-65=211)	2 strokes	(Sweden) Ludwig Nordeklint

== Results in major championships ==
Tournament	2018	2019	2020	2021	2022	2023	2024	2025	2026
Masters Tournament							T16	CUT	CUT
PGA Championship					CUT	T50	T68	T41	T44
U.S. Open							T50		CUT
The Open Championship	CUT		NT		T53	T23	T66	T14	CUT

Did not play

CUT = missed the half-way cut
"T" = tied
NT = no tournament due to COVID-19 pandemic

=== Summary ===
Tournament	Wins	2nd	3rd	Top-5	Top-10	Top-25	Events	Cuts made
Masters Tournament	0	0	0	0	0	1	3	1
PGA Championship	0	0	0	0	0	0	5	4
U.S. Open	0	0	0	0	0	0	2	1
The Open Championship	0	0	0	0	0	2	6	4
Totals	0	0	0	0	0	3	16	10

- Most consecutive cuts made – 7 (2022 Open Championship – 2024 Open Championship)
- Longest streak of top-10s – none

== Results in The Players Championship ==
Tournament	2024	2025	2026
The Players Championship	CUT	CUT	T27

CUT = missed the half-way cut
"T" = tied

== Team appearances ==
Amateur

- European Boys' Team Championship (representing Denmark): 2017 (winners)
- European Amateur Team Championship (representing Denmark): 2018
- Junior Ryder Cup (representing Europe): 2018
- Eisenhower Trophy (representing Denmark): 2018 (winner)
- Summer Youth Olympics mixed team event (representing Denmark): 2018

Professional

- Hero Cup (representing Continental Europe): 2023 (winners)
- Ryder Cup (representing Europe): 2023 (winners)
