= 2018 WGC-HSBC Champions =

- Official chinese poster of the 2018 WGC-HSBC Champions featuring the previous year's champion, Justin Rose.

Tournament information
- Dates: 25–28 October 2018
- Location: Shanghai, China; 31.109°N 121.216°E
- Course: Sheshan Golf Club
- Tours: Asian Tour; European Tour; PGA Tour

Statistics
- Par: 72
- Length: 7,261 yards (6,639 m)
- Field: 77 players
- Cut: None
- Prize fund: $10,000,000
- Winner's share: $1,700,000

Champion
- (United States) Xander Schauffele
- 274 (−14), playoff

Location map
- Location in China Location in Shanghai

The 2018 WGC-HSBC Champions was a golf tournament played from 25–28 October 2018 at the Sheshan Golf Club in Shanghai, China. It was the tenth WGC-HSBC Champions tournament, and the fourth of four World Golf Championships events held in the 2018 calendar year.

Xander Schauffele beat Tony Finau at the first hole of a sudden-death playoff after making a birdie 4 to Finau's par 5. Defending champion Justin Rose finished third, four strokes behind.

== Field ==
The following is a list of players who qualified for the 2018 WGC-HSBC Champions. The criteria are towards the leaders in points lists rather than tournament winners. Players who qualified from multiple categories will be listed in the first category in which they are eligible with the other qualifying categories in parentheses next to the player's name.

1. Winners of the four major championships and The Players Championship

Brooks Koepka (3,4), Francesco Molinari (3,4,5), Patrick Reed (3,4,5)

- Webb Simpson (3,4) did not play.

2. Winners of the previous four World Golf Championships

Justin Rose (3,4,5)

- Phil Mickelson (3,4), Justin Thomas (3,4), and Bubba Watson (3,4) did not play.

3. Top 50 from the OWGR on 8 October

An Byeong-hun, Kiradech Aphibarnrat (5), Keegan Bradley (4), Rafa Cabrera-Bello (5), Patrick Cantlay (4), Paul Casey (4), Jason Day (4), Tony Finau (4), Matt Fitzpatrick (5), Tommy Fleetwood (4,5), Branden Grace, Brian Harman, Tyrrell Hatton (5), Charley Hoffman, Billy Horschel (4), Dustin Johnson (4), Satoshi Kodaira, Hideki Matsuyama (4), Rory McIlroy (4,5), Kevin Na (4), Alex Norén (5), Thorbjørn Olesen (5), Ian Poulter (5), Jon Rahm (4,5), Xander Schauffele (4,5), Adam Scott, Cameron Smith (4), Brandt Snedeker, Kyle Stanley (4)

- Eddie Pepperell (5) and Henrik Stenson did not play due to injury.
- Daniel Berger, Bryson DeChambeau (4), Rickie Fowler (4), Sergio García, Kevin Kisner, Matt Kuchar, Marc Leishman (4), Louis Oosthuizen, Jordan Spieth, Gary Woodland (4), and Tiger Woods (4) did not play.

4. Top 30 from the final 2018 FedEx Cup points list (if there are fewer than five available players, players beyond 30th will be selected to increase the number to five)

Emiliano Grillo, Patton Kizzire, Pan Cheng-tsung, Andrew Putnam, Chez Reavie

- Aaron Wise did not play.

5. Top 30 from the Race to Dubai as of 15 October

Lucas Bjerregaard, Alexander Björk, Jorge Campillo, Ryan Fox, Russell Knox, Alexander Lévy, Li Haotong, Adrián Otaegui, Thomas Pieters, Shubhankar Sharma, Brandon Stone, Andy Sullivan, Julian Suri, Matt Wallace

- Chris Wood was a late withdrawal with a neck injury and was not replaced in the field.

6. The leading four available players from the Asian Tour Order of Merit as of 15 October

Gaganjeet Bhullar, Justin Harding, Park Sang-hyun, Scott Vincent

7. The leading two available players from the Japan Golf Tour Order of Merit as of 15 October

Yuta Ikeda, Yuki Inamori

- Shugo Imahira did not play.

8. The leading two available players from the final 2017 PGA Tour of Australasia Order of Merit

Adam Bland, Brett Rumford

9. The leading two available players from the final 2017–18 Sunshine Tour Order of Merit

George Coetzee, Erik van Rooyen

10. Six players from China

Liang Wenchong, Liu Yanwei, Wu Ashun, Xiao Bowen, Yuan Yechun, Zhang Xinjun

11. Alternates, if needed to fill the field of 78 players

- The next available player on the Orders of Merit of the Asian Tour, Japan Golf Tour, Sunshine Tour, and PGA Tour of Australasia, ranked in order of their position in the OWGR as of 8 October
- Next available player, not otherwise exempt, from Race to Dubai as of 15 October, OWGR as of 8 October, FedEx Cup list

1. John Catlin (Asian Tour; no alternates available from Japan Golf Tour)
2. J. C. Ritchie (Sunshine Tour)
3. Jason Norris (PGA Tour of Australasia)
4. Andrea Pavan (Race to Dubai)
5. Pat Perez (OWGR; Zach Johnson and Luke List did not play)
6. Adam Hadwin (FedEx Cup)
7. Sihwan Kim (Asian Tour)
8. Oliver Bekker (Sunshine Tour)
9. Jason Scrivener (PGA Tour of Australasia)

== Round summaries ==
=== First round ===
Thursday, 25 October 2018

Place	Player	Score	To par
1	(United States) Patrick Reed	64	−8
T2	(United States) Tony Finau	66	−6
T2	(United States) Xander Schauffele	66	−6
4	(England) Matt Fitzpatrick	67	−5
T5	(Thailand) Kiradech Aphibarnrat	68	−4
T5	(Spain) Rafa Cabrera-Bello	68	−4
T5	(England) Tommy Fleetwood	68	−4
T5	(United States) Billy Horschel	68	−4
T5	(Chinese Taipei) Pan Cheng-tsung	68	−4
T10	(United States) Keegan Bradley	69	−3
T10	(South Africa) George Coetzee	69	−3
T10	(England) Ian Poulter	69	−3
T10	(England) Justin Rose	69	−3
T10	(Australia) Adam Scott	69	−3
T10	(England) Matt Wallace	69	−3

=== Second round ===
Friday, 26 October 2018

Place	Player	Score	To par
1	(United States) Tony Finau	66-67=133	−11
T2	(England) Tommy Fleetwood	68-68=136	−8
T2	(United States) Patrick Reed	64-72=136	−8
T2	(England) Justin Rose	69-67=136	−8
5	(United States) Xander Schauffele	66-71=137	−7
6	(United States) Patrick Cantlay	70-68=138	−6
T7	(Thailand) Kiradech Aphibarnrat	68-71=139	−5
T7	(United States) Keegan Bradley	69-70=139	−5
T7	(Argentina) Emiliano Grillo	70-69=139	−5
T7	(United States) Pat Perez	70-69=139	−5
T7	(Belgium) Thomas Pieters	75-64=139	−5
T7	(United States) Kyle Stanley	70-69=139	−5

=== Third round ===
Saturday, 27 October 2018

Place	Player	Score	To par
1	(United States) Tony Finau	66-67-70=203	−13
T2	(United States) Patrick Reed	64-72-70=206	−10
T2	(England) Justin Rose	69-67-70=206	−10
T2	(United States) Xander Schauffele	66-71-69=206	−10
T5	(England) Tommy Fleetwood	68-68-72=208	−8
T5	(United States) Andrew Putnam	70-71-67=208	−8
T7	(Thailand) Kiradech Aphibarnrat	68-71-70=209	−7
T7	(United States) Keegan Bradley	69-70-70=209	−7
9	(Australia) Jason Day	71-70-69=210	−6
T10	(United States) Patrick Cantlay	70-68-73=211	−5
T10	(United States) Billy Horschel	68-72-71=211	−5
T10	(Denmark) Thorbjørn Olesen	75-69-67=211	−5

=== Final round ===
Sunday, 28 October 2018

Place	Player	Score	To par	Prize money (US$)
T1	(United States) Tony Finau	66-67-70-71=274	−14	Playoff
T1	(United States) Xander Schauffele	66-71-69-68=274	−14	Playoff
3	(England) Justin Rose	69-67-70-72=278	−10	587,000
T4	(Thailand) Kiradech Aphibarnrat	68-71-70-71=280	−8	393,000
T4	(United States) Andrew Putnam	70-71-67-72=280	−8	393,000
6	(United States) Keegan Bradley	69-70-70-72=281	−7	289,000
T7	(United States) Patrick Cantlay	70-68-73-72=283	−5	210,563
T7	(England) Tommy Fleetwood	68-68-72-75=283	−5	210,563
T7	(Denmark) Thorbjørn Olesen	75-69-67-72=283	−5	210,563
T7	(United States) Patrick Reed	64-72-70-77=283	−5	210,563

==== Scorecard ====
Hole	1	2	3	4	5	6	7	8	9	10	11	12	13	14	15	16	17	18
Par	4	5	4	3	4	3	4	5	4	4	4	3	4	5	4	4	3	5
(United States) Schauffele	−10	−11	−11	−10	−11	−11	−11	−12	−12	−12	−12	−12	−13	−13	−12	−12	−13	−14
(United States) Finau	−12	−13	−13	−13	−13	−13	−13	−13	−13	−14	−13	−12	−12	−13	−13	−13	−13	−14
(England) Rose	−10	−11	−11	−11	−11	−11	−12	−12	−11	−10	−10	−10	−11	−12	−11	−11	−11	−10
(Thailand) Aphibarnrat	−6	−7	−7	−6	−7	−6	−6	−7	−7	−7	−7	−7	−6	−7	−7	−8	−8	−8
(United States) Putnam	−8	−8	−8	−8	−8	−8	−8	−8	−7	−8	−7	−7	−7	−8	−7	−7	−7	−8
(United States) Bradley	−7	−7	−6	−6	−6	−6	−6	−6	−6	−6	−5	−6	−6	−7	−6	−7	−7	−7
(United States) Reed	−10	−10	−10	−9	−9	−8	−8	−8	−8	−6	−6	−6	−6	−7	−6	−6	−5	−5

Cumulative tournament scores, relative to par

Birdie	Bogey	Double bogey

==== Playoff ====
Place	Player	Score	To par	Money ($)
1	(United States) Xander Schauffele	4	−1	1,700,000
2	(United States) Tony Finau	5	E	1,072,000

The sudden-death playoff started at the 18th hole.
