= Philip Eriksson =

Swedish professional golfer (born 1991)

Personal information
- Full name: Karl Philip Christer Eriksson
- Nationality: Sweden
- Born: 22 November 1991 (age 34) Hallstavik, Sweden
- Life partner: Emma Westin

Career
- Sport: Golf
- Turned professional: 2011
- Former tours: Sunshine Tour; European Tour; Challenge Tour; Nordic Golf League
- Professional wins: 7

Achievements and awards
- PGA of Sweden Future Fund Award: 2020

Philip Eriksson (born 22 November 1991) is a Swedish professional golfer. He won the 2019 Dimension Data Pro-Am on the Sunshine Tour.

== Career ==
Eriksson turned professional in 2011 and joined the Nordic Golf League. In 2016, he missed out on a European Tour card after winning the first stage of Q-School, and joined the Challenge Tour with conditional status.

In 2018, Eriksson qualified for the South Africa-based Sunshine Tour and got his first win at the Dimension Data Pro-Am in February 2019. The win qualified him for the 2019 WGC-FedEx St. Jude Invitational, where he was the highest-ranked golfer in this field at number 377, but made the cut. He ended the 2018–19 Sunshine Tour season 5th in the Order of Merit.

Eriksson finished 38th at 2019 European Tour Qualifying School to earn conditional status for the 2020 European Tour, where he recorded a best finish of tied 8th at the Austrian Open, five strokes behind winner Marc Warren of Scotland. He divided his time between the Sunshine Tour, European Tour and Challenge Tour for the next three years before retiring after the 2023 season.

== Professional wins (7) ==
=== Sunshine Tour wins (1) ===
No.	Date	Tournament	Winning score	Margin of victory	Runner-up
1	17 Feb 2019	Dimension Data Pro-Am	−21 (66-67-67-68=268)	3 strokes	(South Africa) Justin Walters

=== Other Swedish wins (6) ===
- 2013 Skogaby Open
- 2015 Allerum Open
- 2016 Johannesberg Open (Future Series), Gefle Open (Future Series), Kumla Open, Oakley Tour Omberg

== Results in World Golf Championships ==
Tournament	2019
Championship	
Match Play	
Invitational	T51
Champions	

Did not play

"T" = Tied
