= 2021 Ryder Cup =

Men's golf competition between the United States and Europe

43rd Ryder Cup Matches
- Dates: September 24–26, 2021
- Venue: Whistling Straits, Straits Course
- Location: Haven, Wisconsin
- Captains: Steve Stricker (USA); Pádraig Harrington (Europe)
(United States)	19	9	(Europe)
- United States wins the Ryder Cup

Location map
- Location in the United States Location in Wisconsin

The 43rd Ryder Cup Matches were held from September 24–26, 2021, on the Straits course at Whistling Straits, Haven, Wisconsin, US. Europe was the holder of the Ryder Cup after its win over the United States in 2018 at Le Golf National.

The United States, fielding its youngest team in its history, regained the Ryder Cup in 2021 with a record 19–9 victory. This was the largest margin of victory in a Ryder Cup since 1967. Continental Europe joined the Ryder Cup in 1979; this is Europe's heaviest defeat in Ryder Cup history. Combined with its 2016 win at Hazeltine, the United States won back-to-back Ryder Cups on home soil for the first time since 1979 and 1983.

Due to several tournaments, including a number of majors, shifting their schedules due to the COVID-19 pandemic (including one major being canceled and one being moved to November), the Ryder Cup was originally scheduled to take place only five days after the final round of the rescheduled U.S. Open, from September 25 to 27, 2020.

On July 8, 2020, the PGA of America announced the postponement of the event to September 24 to 26, 2021, because of the pandemic. The next Ryder Cup was rescheduled to 2023 and further odd years, while the Presidents Cup was also rescheduled into 2022 and further even years, resetting the yearly rotation of both events to how they were scheduled before the September 11 attacks in 2001.

== Format ==
The Ryder Cup is a match play event, with each match worth one point. The event took place from September 24–26, 2021 at the Whistling Straits in Kohler, Wisconsin. The event was played over three days, with four foursomes (alternate shots) and four fourball matches on the first day. The second day followed with the same matches, and the third day had twelve singles matches. The event was played between teams of twelve representing the United States and Europe. As the hosting team, the United States captain determined which matches were played during the morning session, and which were played in the afternoon.

With a total of 28 points available, 14 1/2 points were required to win the Cup, and 14 points were required for the defending champion to retain the Cup. All matches were played to a maximum of 18 holes.

=== Team selection ===
==== United States ====
The United States qualification rules were announced on February 20, 2019. These were amended on August 5, 2020. The qualification rules are similar to those used for the 2018 Ryder Cup. The majority of the team are selected from the Ryder Cup points list, which is based on prize money won in important tournaments, with one point awarded for every $1,000 earned unless otherwise stated below. The team consists of:

- The leading six players on the Ryder Cup points list gained in the following events:
  - 2019 major championships, 1 point per $1,000 earned.
  - 2019 World Golf Championship events and The Players Championship, 1 point per $2,000 earned.
  - 2020 major championships (double points for the winner, 1.5 times points for those who make the cut).
  - 2020 PGA Tour events. Qualifying events in this category are those played between January 1 and the conclusion of the Mayakoba Golf Classic on December 6, 2020 (previously August 23, 2020, the date of the BMW Championship). "Alternate" events (those played opposite a major or WGC event) do not earn points.
  - 2021 PGA Tour events. Qualifying events in this category are those played between January 10 and the conclusion of the BMW Championship. "Alternate" events (those played opposite a major or WGC event) do not earn points.
  - 2021 major championships (double points for the winner, 1.5 times points for those who make the cut).
- Six captain's picks
  - Announced on September 8, 2021, three days after the conclusion of the Tour Championship

The leading 15 players in the final points list after the final qualifying event, the BMW Championship, were:

Position	Name	Points
1	Collin Morikawa (Q)	18,883.82
2	Dustin Johnson (Q)	18,058.24
3	Bryson DeChambeau (Q)	17,367.91
4	Brooks Koepka (Q)	15,418.06
5	Justin Thomas (Q)	15,269.82
6	Patrick Cantlay (Q)	13,391.33
7	Tony Finau (P)	12,970.65
8	Xander Schauffele (P)	12,730.20
9	Jordan Spieth (P)	12,462.51
10	Harris English (P)	11,605.30
11	Patrick Reed	10,931.70
12	Daniel Berger (P)	10,906.57
13	Webb Simpson	9,833.89
14	Scottie Scheffler (P)	9,295.80
15	Jason Kokrak	8,345.03

Players in qualifying places (Q) are shown in green; captain's picks (P) are shown in yellow.

==== Europe ====
The European team qualification rules were announced on May 8, 2019. There was one significant change from the previous Ryder Cup, with the number of captain's picks reduced from four to three. Following the postponement, points were frozen from after the Qatar Masters until January 1, 2021, with the new end date and amendments to the points multipliers expected to be announced before then. The team consisted of:

- The leading four players on the Race to Dubai Points List
  - Points earned in all Race to Dubai tournaments starting in September 2019 with the BMW PGA Championship and ending with the BMW PGA Championship in September 2020. Points earned in the later events of 2020 were multiplied by 1.5.
  - The leading four members on The Ryder Cup European Points List on September 12, 2021 (or as at the conclusion of the BMW PGA Championship, whichever was the latter and so long as such tournament concluded no later than September 13, 2021).
- The leading five players, not qualified above, on the World Points List
  - Total World Points earned in Official World Golf Ranking events starting in September 2019 with the BMW PGA Championship and ending with the BMW PGA Championship in September 2020. Points earned in the later events of 2020 were multiplied by 1.5. No World points were earned from tournaments staged opposite Rolex Series tournaments in both 2019 and 2020.
  - The leading five members, not otherwise qualified above, on The Ryder Cup World Points List on Sunday, September 12, 2021 (or at the conclusion of the BMW PGA Championship, whichever was the latter and so long as such tournament concluded no later than September 13, 2021).
- Three captain's picks
  - The captain, Padraig Harrington, chose the remaining three members on September 12, 2021.

The leading players in the final point lists were:

European points list
Position	Name	Points
1	Jon Rahm (Q)	10,122.82
2	Tommy Fleetwood (Q)	6,487.92
3	Tyrrell Hatton (Q)	5,242.76
4	Bernd Wiesberger (Q)	4,918.19
5	Matt Fitzpatrick (q)	4,824.02
6	Rory McIlroy (q)	4,810.17
7	Paul Casey (q)	4,110.62
8	Victor Perez	4,022.63
9	Robert MacIntyre	3,696.97
10	Guido Migliozzi	3,599.62
11	Thomas Detry	3,201.54
12	Viktor Hovland (q)	3,057.52
13	Richard Bland	2,931.41
14	Justin Rose	2,761.87
15	Shane Lowry (P)	2,704.75
16	Matthias Schwab	2,703.03
17	Lee Westwood (q)	2,657.57
18	Danny Willett	2,498.39
19	Sergio García (P)	2,288.89
20	Rasmus Højgaard	2,263.06
21	Calum Hill	2,209.49
22	Nicolai Højgaard	2,157.80
23	Ian Poulter (P)	2,150.18

World points list
Position	Name	Points
1	Jon Rahm (q)	853.90
2	Rory McIlroy (Q)	466.09
3	Viktor Hovland (Q)	367.53
4	Paul Casey (Q)	323.10
5	Tyrrell Hatton (q)	311.33
6	Matt Fitzpatrick (Q)	281.66
7	Tommy Fleetwood (q)	259.91
8	Lee Westwood (Q)	258.95
9	Shane Lowry (P)	239.41
10	Sergio García (P)	206.67
11	Bernd Wiesberger (q)	197.46
12	Victor Perez	195.41
13	Robert MacIntyre	186.49
14	Ian Poulter (P)	181.48
15	Guido Migliozzi	176.61

Players in qualifying places (Q) are shown in green; captain's picks (P) are shown in yellow; those in italics (q) qualified through the other points list.

== Teams ==
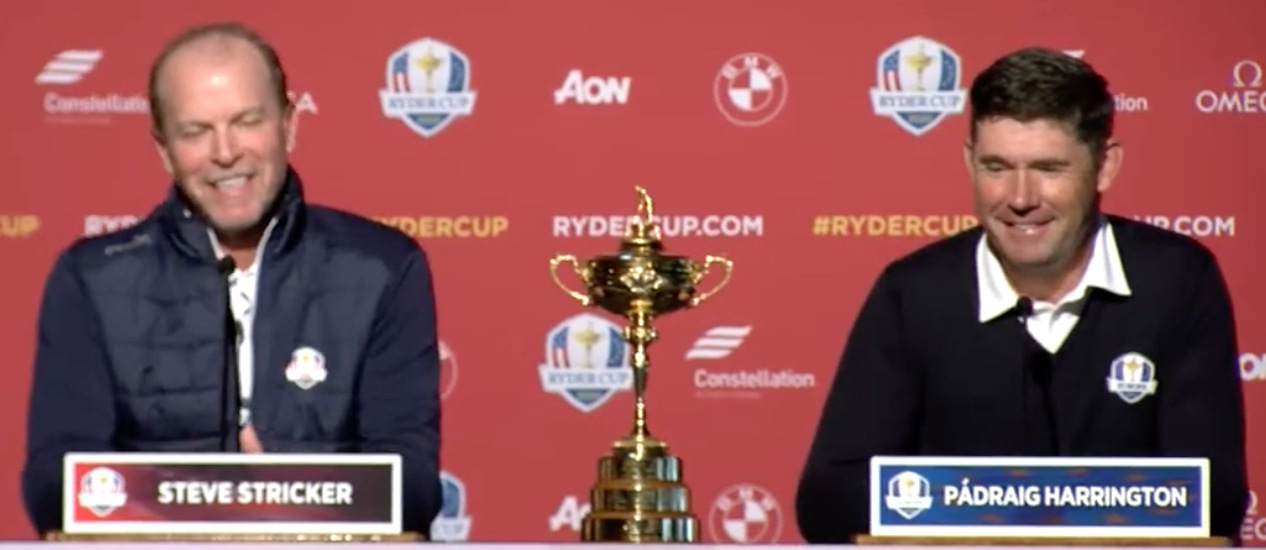
Team captains at the one year to go 2020 Ryder Cup press conference in 2019

=== Captains ===
Both team captains were announced in early 2019; Pádraig Harrington was named as the European team captain on January 8, and Wisconsin native Steve Stricker as the U.S. team captain on February 20.

=== Vice-captains ===
For the U.S. team, in October 2019, Stricker announced Jim Furyk as his first vice-captain. On May 11, 2020, Zach Johnson and Davis Love III were revealed as the next two vice-captains. On September 1, 2021, Stricker named his final two vice-captains, Phil Mickelson and Fred Couples.

For the European team, in September 2019, Harrington announced Robert Karlsson as his first vice-captain. In May 2020, he accidentally revealed Luke Donald as his second vice-captain during an interview. In June 2021, Harrington announced two more of his vice-captains, Martin Kaymer and Graeme McDowell. On September 15, 2021, nine days ahead of the tournament, Henrik Stenson was named as the fifth and final European vice-captain.

=== Players ===
United States team
Name	Age	Points rank	World ranking	Previous Ryder Cups	Matches	Record	Win percentage
Collin Morikawa	24	1	3	0	Rookie		
Dustin Johnson	37	2	2	4	16	7–9–0	43.75
Bryson DeChambeau	28	3	7	1	3	0–3–0	0.00
Brooks Koepka	31	4	10	2	8	4–3–1	56.25
Justin Thomas	28	5	6	1	5	4–1–0	80.00
Patrick Cantlay	29	6	4	0	Rookie		
Tony Finau (P)	32	7	9	1	3	2–1–0	66.67
Xander Schauffele (P)	27	8	5	0	Rookie		
Jordan Spieth (P)	28	9	13	3	14	7–5–2	57.14
Harris English (P)	32	10	11	0	Rookie		
Daniel Berger (P)	28	12	16	0	Rookie		
Scottie Scheffler (P)	25	14	21	0	Rookie		

The hosting United States team contained eight (of their twelve) players in the top 10 of the world rankings, while also containing eight players under the age of 30 and six rookies, the most in one team since 2008. Based on the Official World Golf Rankings prior to the event, ten of the U.S. players were ranked ahead of Europe's second-highest-ranked player (No. 14, Viktor Hovland).

Europe team
Name	Country	Age	Points rank (European)	Points rank (World)	World ranking	Previous Ryder Cups	Matches	Record	Win percentage
Jon Rahm	Spain	26	1	1	1	1	3	1–2–0	33.33
Tommy Fleetwood	England	30	2	7	37	1	5	4–1–0	80.00
Tyrrell Hatton	England	29	3	5	19	1	3	1–2–0	33.33
Bernd Wiesberger	Austria	35	4	11	63	0	Rookie		
Rory McIlroy	Northern Ireland	32	6	2	15	5	24	11–9–4	54.17
Viktor Hovland	Norway	24	12	3	14	0	Rookie		
Paul Casey	England	44	7	4	24	4	12	4–3–5	54.17
Matt Fitzpatrick	England	27	5	6	27	1	2	0–2–0	0.00
Lee Westwood	England	48	17	8	35	10	44	20–18–6	52.27
Shane Lowry (P)	Ireland	34	15	9	41	0	Rookie		
Sergio García (P)	Spain	41	19	10	43	9	41	22–12–7	62.20
Ian Poulter (P)	England	45	23	14	50	6	22	14–6–2	68.18

Captain's picks (P) are shown in yellow. World rankings and match records are prior to the start of the 2021 Ryder Cup.

Viktor Hovland (Norway) and Bernd Wiesberger (Austria) were the first players from their countries to qualify for a Ryder Cup team. Lee Westwood was the oldest player to represent the European team since Christy O'Connor Snr in 1973.

== Course ==
Hole	Name	Yards	Metres	Par	Hole	Name	Yards	Metres	Par
1	Outward Bound	364	333	4	10	Voyageur	361	330	4
2	Cross Country	593	542	5	11	Sand Box	519	475	4
3	O' Man	181	166	3	12	Pop Up	143	131	3
4	Glory	489	447	4	13	Cliff Hanger	404	369	4
5	Snake	603	551	5	14	Widow's Watch	396	362	4
6	Gremlin's Ear	355	325	4	15	Grand Strand	518	474	4
7	Shipwreck	221	202	3	16	Endless Bite	552	505	5
8	On the Rocks	507	464	4	17	Pinched Nerve	223	204	3
9	Down and Dirty	446	408	4	18	Dyeabolical	515	471	4
Out		3,759	3,438	36	In		3,631	3,321	35
Source:					Total		7,390	6,759	71

The 11th hole was converted to a par-4 for this Ryder Cup.

== Event summary ==
=== Friday's matches ===
The opening round of four foursomes matches started at 7:05 am local time. Pairings were announced at the Opening Ceremony on Thursday. The first point was won by Europe, with Jon Rahm and Sergio García winning, 3 and 1, against Justin Thomas and Jordan Spieth. The first point for the United States was won by Dustin Johnson and Collin Morikawa winning, 3 and 2, against Paul Casey and Viktor Hovland. After winning the first five holes, the second American point was won by Patrick Cantlay and Xander Schauffele by winning 5 and 3, over Rory McIlroy and Ian Poulter. The final point of the session, third overall for the United States to take a 3–1 lead was won by Brooks Koepka and Daniel Berger winning, 2 and 1, against Lee Westwood and Matt Fitzpatrick.

	Results
Rahm/García	(Europe) 3 & 1	Thomas/Spieth
Casey/Hovland	(United States) 3 & 2	Johnson/Morikawa
Westwood/Fitzpatrick	(United States) 2 & 1	Koepka/Berger
McIlroy/Poulter	(United States) 5 & 3	Cantlay/Schauffele
1	Session	3
1	Overall	3

The first result of the afternoon fourball matches came in the third match, which Tony Finau and Harris English won, 4 and 3, over Rory McIlroy and Shane Lowry, giving Team USA an overall 4–1 lead. Team USA won the second point of the session when Dustin Johnson and Xander Schauffele won, 2 and 1, against Paul Casey and Bernd Wiesberger, giving the Americans a 5–1 lead. The second overall match and third points of the session was tied between Bryson DeChambeau and Scottie Scheffler and Jon Rahm and Tyrrell Hatton, giving the United States a 5 1/2–1 1/2 lead. In the final match, Justin Thomas and Patrick Cantlay tied their match with Tommy Fleetwood and Viktor Hovland giving the Americans 3 points to Europe's 1 point for the afternoon session. The United States ended day 1 with a 6–2 lead, the largest first-day lead for either side since the 2004 Ryder Cup.

	Results
Casey/Wiesberger	(United States) 2 & 1	Johnson/Schauffele
Rahm/Hatton	halved	DeChambeau/Scheffler
McIlroy/Lowry	(United States) 4 & 3	Finau/English
Fleetwood/Hovland	halved	Thomas/Cantlay
1	Session	3
2	Overall	6

=== Saturday's matches ===
Rahm and García won the opening foursomes match, 3 and 1, against Koepka and Berger, despite being three down after five holes. Johnson and Morikawa won six of the first nine holes on their way to winning 2 and 1 over Casey and Hatton. Spieth and Thomas won their first points of the week with a 2 up victory over Wiesberger and Hovland. Cantlay and Schauffele won their second match as partners, earning the Americans their third point of the session with a 2 and 1 victory against Westwood and Fitzpatrick. The United States team ended the Saturday morning session with a 9–3 lead.

	Results
Rahm/García	(Europe) 3 & 1	Koepka/Berger
Casey/Hatton	(United States) 2 & 1	Johnson/Morikawa
Hovland/Wiesberger	(United States) 2 up	Thomas/Spieth
Westwood/Fitzpatrick	(United States) 2 & 1	Schauffele/Cantlay
1	Session	3
3	Overall	9

In the afternoon fourball matches, Lowry and Hatton both earned their first full point of the week with a 1 up victory over Finau and English. Rahm and García continued their dominance as a pairing, earning their third point as partners with a 2 and 1 win against Koepka and Spieth. The third match of the day was all square through 13 holes but the American pairing of Scheffler and DeChambeau won the next four holes for a 3 and 1 victory against Fleetwood and Hovland. The final match of the day saw Johnson and Morikawa earn their third overall point as a pairing with a 4 and 3 victory against Poulter and McIlroy. With the session shared 2–2, the United States team maintained its six-point lead. The 11–5 lead was the largest lead through two days of a Ryder Cup since 1975.

	Results
Lowry/Hatton	(Europe) 1 up	Finau/English
Rahm/García	(Europe) 2 & 1	Koepka/Spieth
Fleetwood/Hovland	(United States) 3 & 1	Scheffler/DeChambeau
Poulter/McIlroy	(United States) 4 & 3	Johnson/Morikawa
2	Session	2
5	Overall	11

=== Sunday's matches ===
Team Europe won the opening singles match of the day when McIlroy defeated Schauffele, 3 and 2, however the United States team went on to win six of the next eight matches to regain the Ryder Cup. Scheffler birdied five of the first six holes and ultimately defeated the previously unbeaten Rahm, 4 and 3; Cantlay remained unbeaten for the week with a 4 and 2 victory over Lowry; and DeChambeau, having eagled the opening hole after driving the green, never trailed in his 3 and 2 win over García to take the team to 14 points. The cup winning 1/2 point came when Morikawa and Hovland tied their match, bringing the overall score to 14 1/2–6 1/2.

In the remaining matches, Koepka defeated Wiesberger, 2 and 1; Thomas won five of the first nine holes in defeating Tyrrell Hatton, 4 and 3; Johnson made 8 birdies in his 1 up victory against Casey, going a record tying 5–0–0 on the week; team Europe earned two full points when Poulter won, 3 and 2, against Finau and Westwood won the 18th hole for a 1 up victory over English; Spieth and Fleetwood tied their match. Finally, Berger secured a 1 up victory over Fitzpatrick to give the United States team a record 19 points.

The United States went 7–3–2 in singles matches to defeat Europe 19–9. This was the largest margin of victory in a Ryder Cup since the United States beat Great Britain and Ireland by 10 points in 1975 (in a format in which 32 rather than 28 match points were decided).

	Results		Timetable
Rory McIlroy	(Europe) 3 & 2	Xander Schauffele	1st: 6–11
Shane Lowry	(United States) 4 & 2	Patrick Cantlay	3rd: 6–13
Jon Rahm	(United States) 4 & 3	Scottie Scheffler	2nd: 6–12
Sergio García	(United States) 3 & 2	Bryson DeChambeau	4th: 6–14
Viktor Hovland	halved	Collin Morikawa	5th: 6 1/2–14 1/2
Paul Casey	(United States) 1 up	Dustin Johnson	8th: 6 1/2–17 1/2
Bernd Wiesberger	(United States) 2 & 1	Brooks Koepka	6th: 6 1/2–15 1/2
Ian Poulter	(Europe) 3 & 2	Tony Finau	9th: 7 1/2–17 1/2
Tyrrell Hatton	(United States) 4 & 3	Justin Thomas	7th: 6 1/2–16 1/2
Lee Westwood	(Europe) 1 up	Harris English	10th: 8 1/2–17 1/2
Tommy Fleetwood	halved	Jordan Spieth	11th: 9–18
Matt Fitzpatrick	(United States) 1 up	Daniel Berger	12th: 9–19
4	Session	8
9	Overall	19

== Individual player records ==
Each entry refers to the win–loss–tie record of the player.

=== United States ===
Player	Points	Matches	Overall	Singles	Foursomes	Fourballs
Daniel Berger	2	3	2–1–0	1–0–0	1–1–0	0–0–0
Patrick Cantlay	3.5	4	3–0–1	1–0–0	2–0–0	0–0–1
Bryson DeChambeau	2.5	3	2–0–1	1–0–0	0–0–0	1–0–1
Harris English	1	3	1–2–0	0–1–0	0–0–0	1–1–0
Tony Finau	1	3	1–2–0	0–1–0	0–0–0	1–1–0
Dustin Johnson	5	5	5–0–0	1–0–0	2–0–0	2–0–0
Brooks Koepka	2	4	2–2–0	1–0–0	1–1–0	0–1–0
Collin Morikawa	3.5	4	3–0–1	0–0–1	2–0–0	1–0–0
Xander Schauffele	3	4	3–1–0	0–1–0	2–0–0	1–0–0
Scottie Scheffler	2.5	3	2–0–1	1–0–0	0–0–0	1–0–1
Jordan Spieth	1.5	4	1–2–1	0–0–1	1–1–0	0–1–0
Justin Thomas	2.5	4	2–1–1	1–0–0	1–1–0	0–0–1

=== Europe ===
Player	Points	Matches	Overall	Singles	Foursomes	Fourballs
Paul Casey	0	4	0–4–0	0–1–0	0–2–0	0–1–0
Matt Fitzpatrick	0	3	0–3–0	0–1–0	0–2–0	0–0–0
Tommy Fleetwood	1	3	0–1–2	0–0–1	0–0–0	0–1–1
Sergio García	3	4	3–1–0	0–1–0	2–0–0	1–0–0
Tyrrell Hatton	1.5	4	1–2–1	0–1–0	0–1–0	1–0–1
Viktor Hovland	1	5	0–3–2	0–0–1	0–2–0	0–1–1
Shane Lowry	1	3	1–2–0	0–1–0	0–0–0	1–1–0
Rory McIlroy	1	4	1–3–0	1–0–0	0–1–0	0–2–0
Ian Poulter	1	3	1–2–0	1–0–0	0–1–0	0–1–0
Jon Rahm	3.5	5	3–1–1	0–1–0	2–0–0	1–0–1
Lee Westwood	1	3	1–2–0	1–0–0	0–2–0	0–0–0
Bernd Wiesberger	0	3	0–3–0	0–1–0	0–1–0	0–1–0

== Media ==
The 2021 Ryder Cup was televised in the United States by Golf Channel, NBC and on NBC streaming site Peacock. In the United Kingdom and Ireland, the event was broadcast by Sky Sports; the broadcaster re-branded its Sky Sports Golf channel as Sky Sports Ryder Cup for the week of the event. Both owned by Comcast, both the Golf Channel and Sky Sports held joint broadcasts, particularly during their morning buildup shows for each day. Highlights were also shown on BBC in the UK each night.
