= Xander Schauffele =

American professional golfer (born 1993)

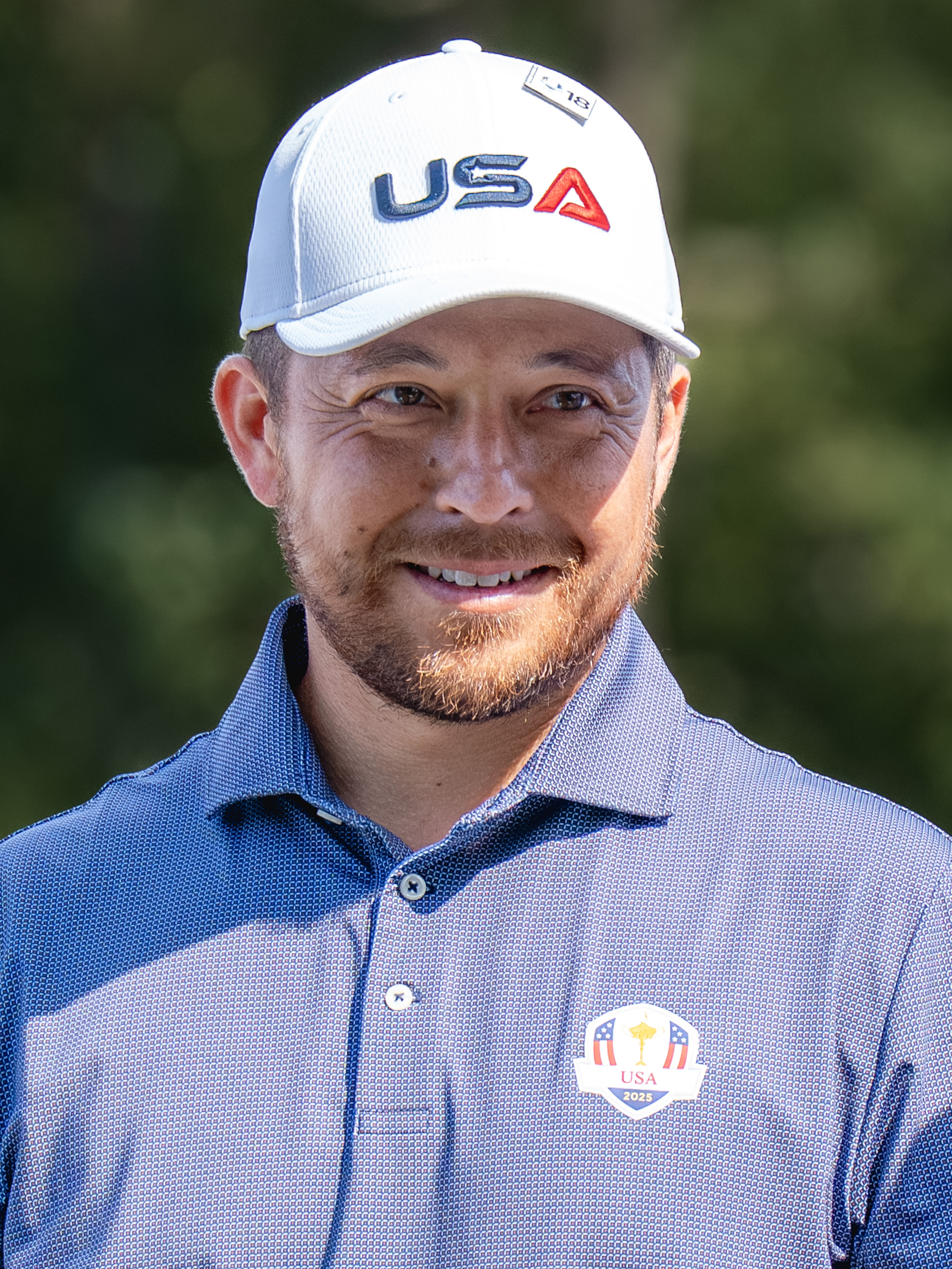
- Schauffele at the 2025 Ryder Cup

Personal information
- Full name: Alexander Victor Schauffele
- Nickname: X
- Nationality: United States
- Born: October 25, 1993 (age 33) San Diego, California, U.S.
- Height: 5 ft 10 in (178 cm)
- Weight: 175 lb (79 kg)
- Spouse: Maya Schauffele (m. 2021)
- Children: 1

Career
- Sport: Golf
- College: California State University Long Beach; San Diego State University
- Turned professional: 2015
- Current tour: PGA Tour
- Former tours: European Tour; Web.com Tour
- Professional wins: 13
- Highest ranking: 2 (May 19, 2024) (as of October 25, 2026)

Number of wins by tour
- PGA Tour: 10
- European Tour: 4
- Other: 3

Best results in major championships (wins: 2)
- Masters Tournament: T2: 2019
- PGA Championship: Won: 2024
- U.S. Open: T3: 2019
- The Open Championship: Won: 2024

Achievements and awards
- PGA Tour Rookie of the Year: 2016–17
Medal record
Men's golf
Representing the United States
Olympic Games
Gold medal – first place	2020 Tokyo	Individual

Xander Schauffele
- Traditional Chinese: 陳山大
- Simplified Chinese: 陈山大
Transcriptions
Standard Mandarin
- Hanyu Pinyin: Chén Shāndà
- Wade–Giles: Chʻên2 Shan1-ta4

Alexander Victor Schauffele (/ˈzændər ˈʃaʊfəleɪ/; born October 25, 1993) is an American professional golfer who plays on the PGA Tour. He won the Tour Championship in 2017 and the gold medal at the men's individual golf event of the 2020 Summer Olympics in Tokyo, Japan. He has won two major championships, both in the same year, the 2024 PGA Championship and the 2024 Open Championship. Schauffele also competed at the 2024 Summer Olympics.

== Early life ==
Schauffele was born on October 25, 1993, in San Diego, California, to Chen Ping-Yi and Stefan Schauffele. His mother was born in Taiwan, but grew up in Japan before moving to the United States. His father Stefan was born in Stuttgart to a French-Austrian mother and a German father. Stefan was an aspiring decathlete. While traveling to the German national training center at age 20, he was hit by a drunk driver and suffered career-ending injuries. During recovery, he became interested in golf, and later moved to the United States. He worked at a golf academy in San Diego and as an assistant golf professional in Hawaii.

Schauffele's parents met at San Diego's United States International University in 1988 and married three months afterwards. They then moved to Germany, where Xander's elder brother Nico was born, before returning to San Diego.

Schauffele's father introduced him to golf at age nine, and they joined Bernardo Heights Country Club. Stefan was Xander's only swing coach from that point until Xander was aged 30. Stefan's teaching philosophy relies heavily on basic ball flight laws and golf club mechanics. As a result, Xander did not see his own swing until about age 18. Schauffele began working with Chris Como, formerly a coach of Tiger Woods and Bryson DeChambeau, in November 2023.

Two of Schauffele's great-grandfathers played soccer in Europe. Johann Hoffmann played for the Austria national football team and won multiple Austrian, Bohemian, and French national titles. After playing football for VfB Stuttgart, Richard Schauffele excelled in track and field, garnering over 40 titles in discus, javelin and shot put. Xander himself played soccer in his youth before focusing on golf, after his soccer coach refused to reposition him from a defensive midfielder to offensive midfielder.

== Amateur career ==
Schauffele was the individual winner of the 2011 California State High School Championship (California Interscholastic Federation, CIF), playing for Scripps Ranch High School. After graduating from high school, Schauffele played his freshman year in college at California State University Long Beach, where he garnered the 2012 Big West Conference Freshman of the Year as well as the 2012 First Team All-Big West awards.

Prior to his sophomore year, Schauffele transferred to San Diego State University (SDSU), where eventually he would play out his college career and graduate in 2015. During his three years at SDSU, Schauffele was a Ping and Golfweek Third Team All-American. Scholastically, he was twice awarded the Mountain West Conference All-Academic Team Award. At SDSU, he holds the records for all-time lowest tournament score against par (−17); all-time career scoring average (71.50); as well as the seasonal records for par-5 performance (4.5135); birdies (171) and eagles (9).

Schauffele defeated Beau Hossler to win the 2014 California State Amateur Championship at La Costa Resort and Spa. Later that summer, the two long-time rivals met again in a final at Chicago's Beverly Country Club for the 2014 Western Amateur, where Schauffele lost to Hossler in the final match in dramatic fashion.

Schauffele accumulated a collegiate record that featured 27 top-10s, 19 of which were top-fives, with four of these being runners-up and three wins (from a total of 50 tournaments). He was ranked in the top 10 of the World Amateur Golf Ranking at the time he turned professional in 2015.

== Professional career ==
=== Web.com Tour ===
After turning professional in June 2015, Schauffele entered the 2015 Web.com Tour Qualifying Tournament in fall. He was runner-up in first stage at Southern Dunes GC in Maricopa, Arizona. He went on to win second stage at Oak Valley GC in Beaumont, California, and ultimately, narrowly, earned his Web.com Tour card in the finals in Florida in a tie for 45th.

In 2016, Schauffele played a full season (23 events) on the Web.com Tour. He finished 26th on the regular-season money list, missing a PGA Tour card for 2017 by less than $1,000, but went on to earn a card through the Web.com Tour Finals by finishing 15th on the Finals money list (excluding the 25 regular-season graduates).

=== 2016–17 PGA Tour: Rookie of the Year ===
Schauffele made his PGA Tour debut at the CareerBuilder Challenge in La Quinta, California. In June 2017, at the 2017 U.S. Open held at Erin Hills, Schauffele recorded a bogey-free 6-under-par 66, the first time a player has returned a bogey-free round of 66 or better in their first appearance in U.S. Open. He subsequently became one of only 15 players to ever reach 10 under par at a U.S. Open. He eventually finished in a tie for fifth place, earning him an exemption into the 2018 championship.

Three weeks later, in July, Schauffele recorded his first PGA Tour victory, at the Greenbrier Classic. With the win, he earned exemptions into the Open Championship, via the Open Qualifying Series, the PGA Championship and the 2018 Masters Tournament.

Schauffele qualified for the end-of-season Tour Championship by moving up to 26th in the standings, from 33rd at the start of the FedEx Cup Playoffs. There he birdied the 72nd hole to claim his second tour victory, by one stroke over Justin Thomas, and become the first rookie to win the Tour Championship. It was also the first time a rookie had won any FedEx Cup playoff event. The win moved Schauffele to third place in the final FedEx Cup standings, bettering the previous best mark by a rookie held by Jordan Spieth by four positions, and gave him a three-year exemption on the PGA Tour, through the 2019–20 season.

During 2017, Schauffele rose to 32nd in the Official World Golf Ranking, up 267 spots from his 2016 year-end position of 299. He was voted Rookie of the Year for 2017 by his peers.

=== Continued success: 2018 season through 2024 season ===
At the beginning of 2018, Schauffele switched equipment manufacturers, signing an endorsement deal with Callaway, having previously been sponsored by TaylorMade. In May, he finished T2 at the 2018 Players Championship at TPC Sawgrass with a score of 14 under par. In the Open Championship at Carnoustie, he tied for second with a score of 6 under par.

Schauffele began the 2018 FedEx Cup Playoffs in 28th position in the standings. Entering the third of four events in the playoff series, the 2018 BMW Championship, he was 41st, needing to move up at least eleven spots to advance to the Tour Championship. He finished in a tie for third to rise to 18th position. That finish allowed him the opportunity to attempt to defend his 2017 Tour Championship title. Schauffele ultimately finished T7 at the 2018 Tour Championship, while placing 15th in the season-long FedEx Cup.

Schauffele joined the 2018 European Tour as an associate member. With his win at the 2018 WGC-HSBC Champions, Schauffele rose in the European Tour's Order of Merit, the year-long points race dubbed the European Tour Race to Dubai, to 4th position. Schauffele entered the European Tour final event, the DP World Tour Championship, Dubai, in 5th position. With a final round score of 6-under-par 66, which equaled the lowest score of the day, Schauffele finished T16. This ensured a season-ending 4th position on the Order of Merit and participation in the 2018 European Tour's bonus pool.

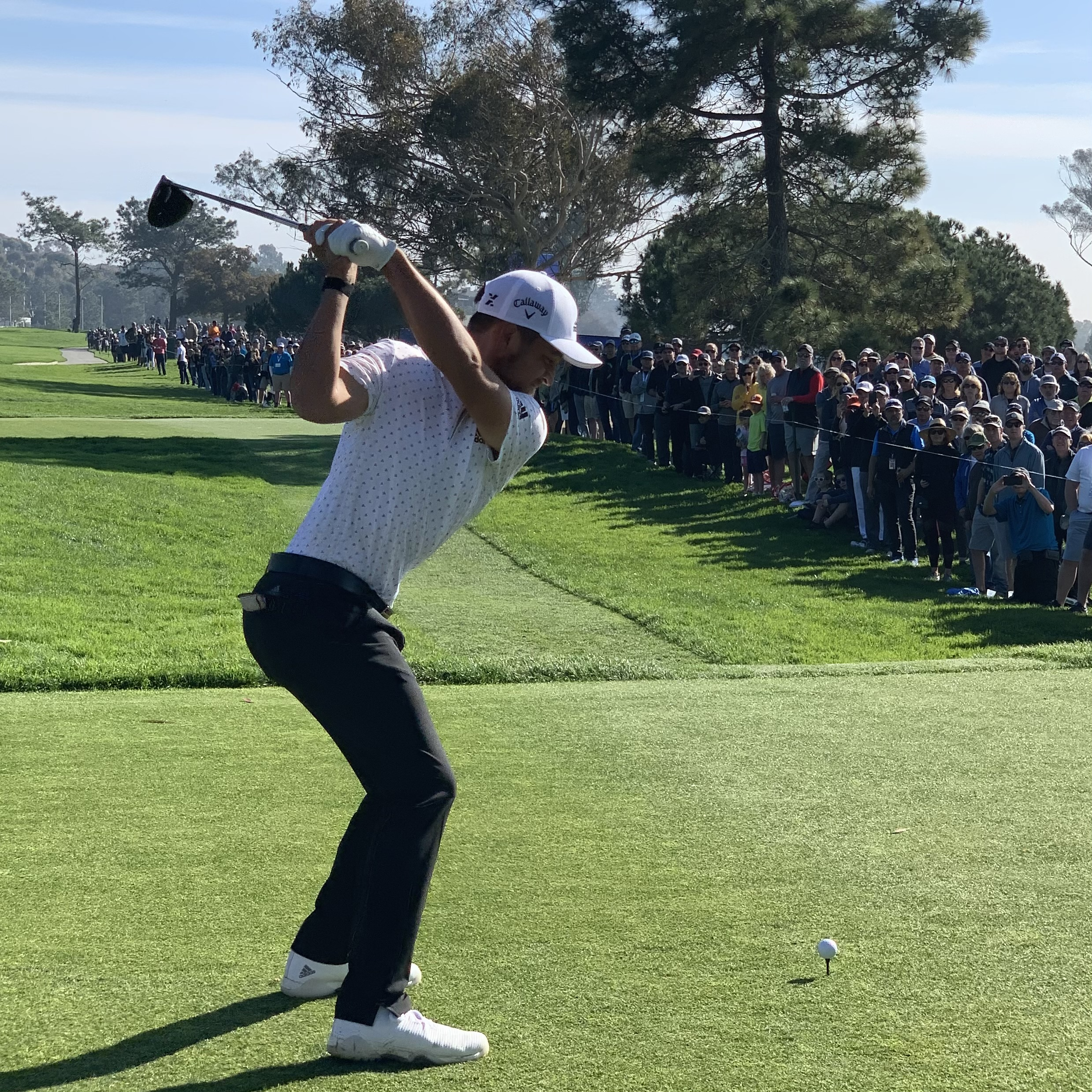
Schauffele at the 2020 Farmers Insurance Open

In October 2018, Schauffele won the WGC-HSBC Champions event in Shanghai, China, at the Sheshan Golf Club, in a playoff, defeating Tony Finau on the first extra hole. In January 2019, he won the Sentry Tournament of Champions at The Plantation Course at Kapalua Resort in Maui, Hawaii, returning a course record equalling 11-under-par 62 in the final round to pass Gary Woodland, whom he had trailed by five shots entering the final round.

In April, Schauffele tied for second in the Masters Tournament, one stroke behind champion Tiger Woods. It was his third top-five in eight starts at major championships. He led the field with 25 birdies, becoming the third player since 1980 to have 25 or more birdies in a single Masters, joining Phil Mickelson (25 in 2001) and Jordan Spieth (28 in 2015). In June, he finished tied for 3rd at the U.S. Open at Pebble Beach Golf Links in Pebble Beach, California. At The Open Championship in July 2019, he became the first player to have their driver fail The R&A's conformity test.

In early August 2019, Schauffele placed 4th in the inaugural 2019 Wyndham Rewards Top 10. Through the playoffs, he fell to 8th in the standings entering the Tour Championship; this gave him a 6-shot deficit to the leader, Justin Thomas, under the new handicapping system. He had erased the deficit after the first round with a score of 6-under-par 64 and was tied for the lead going into the second round. He ultimately finished in second place, but took maximum world ranking points having returned the lowest aggregate score.

In December 2019, Schauffele played on the U.S. team at the 2019 Presidents Cup at Royal Melbourne Golf Club in Australia. The U.S. team won 16–14. Schauffele went 3–2–0 and won his Sunday singles match against International team star and veteran Adam Scott. Golf Digest called Schauffele the "unsung hero" of the U.S. team.

At the 16th tee of the final round of the 2021 Masters Tournament, Schauffele was in second place, two strokes behind the leader. However, at that hole, he shot a triple bogey, and ultimately finished third.

In August, Schauffele recorded a final-round of 67 to win the Olympic gold medal; he made an up-and-down for par on the final hole to beat Slovak Rory Sabbatini by one shot. With the accomplishment, Schauffele became the first American since 1904 to win an Olympic gold medal in golf. In September, Schauffele played on the U.S. team in the 2021 Ryder Cup at Whistling Straits in Kohler, Wisconsin. The U.S. team won 19–9 and Schauffele went 3–1–0, winning in both fourball and foursomes, then losing his Sunday singles match against Rory McIlroy.

In April, Schauffele won the Zurich Classic of New Orleans, a team event, with playing partner Patrick Cantlay. In June, he won the Travelers Championship for his sixth PGA Tour victory. In July, he won the J. P. McManus Pro-Am, an unofficial event on the European Tour held at Adare Manor, after shooting a course record 64 in the first round. The same week, he won the co-sanctioned Genesis Scottish Open played at the Renaissance Club in East Lothian, Scotland. It was his third PGA Tour victory in the 2021–22 season, and his seventh overall.

Schauffele qualified for the U.S. team at the 2022 Presidents Cup; he won three and lost one of the four matches he played.

In September 2023, Schauffele played on the U.S. team in the 2023 Ryder Cup at Marco Simone Golf and Country Club in Guidonia, Rome, Italy. The European team won 16.5–11.5 and Schauffele went 1–3–0, including a win in his Sunday singles match against Nicolai Højgaard.

=== 2024: Major championship wins ===
Having only previously worked with his dad, Stefan, from the very beginning, Xander made a coaching change and started working with Chris Como for the 2024 season.

In May 2024, Schauffele won his first major with a birdie on the final hole in the PGA Championship at Valhalla Golf Club. Schauffele won the tournament with a score of 21 under par, which is a record low for a major championship. He beat Bryson DeChambeau by one stroke after DeChambeau also birdied the final hole.

In July, Schauffele won the Open Championship at Royal Troon, the second major of his career. Schauffele became the first golfer to win two majors in one season when shooting a final-round 65 at each one. He also became the first golfer to win multiple majors in the same year since Brooks Koepka won the 2018 U.S. Open and PGA Championship. Schauffele pulled away from a crowded leaderboard with a 31 on the back nine in the final round to beat Justin Rose and Billy Horschel by two shots.

In October 2025, Schauffele won the Baycurrent Classic in Japan for his first win of the year. Prior to the win, Schauffele had two top-10 finishes in the 2025 season, but failed to make the Tour Championship for the first time since 2017.

== Personal life ==
Schauffele met his wife, Maya, in college at San Diego State University. They were married in 2021. Schauffele has several relatives who live near Tokyo, and the two have traveled to Japan together. She caddied for Schauffele at the 2024 Masters Tournament Par 3 Contest.

Schauffele is an enthusiastic cigar smoker. His father introduced him to cigars at the age of 10, and his favorite cigar is the Montecristo No. 2. He has been featured by Cigar Aficionado.

== Amateur wins ==
- 2011 California State High School Championship
- 2012 OGIO UC Santa Barbara Invite
- 2014 Lamkin Grips SD Classic, California State Amateur Championship
- 2015 Barona Collegiate Cup

== Professional wins (13) ==
=== PGA Tour wins (10) ===
Legend
Major championships (2)
World Golf Championships (1)
FedEx Cup playoff events (1)
Other PGA Tour (6)

No.	Date	Tournament	Winning score	To par	Margin of victory	Runner(s)-up
1	Jul 9, 2017	Greenbrier Classic	64-69-66-67=266	−14	1 stroke	(United States) Robert Streb
2	Sep 24, 2017	Tour Championship	69-66-65-68=268	−12	1 stroke	(United States) Justin Thomas
3	Oct 28, 2018	WGC-HSBC Champions	66-71-69-68=274	−14	Playoff	(United States) Tony Finau
4	Jan 6, 2019	Sentry Tournament of Champions	72-67-68-62=269	−23	1 stroke	(United States) Gary Woodland
5	Apr 24, 2022	Zurich Classic of New Orleans (with (United States) Patrick Cantlay)	59-68-60-72=259	−29	2 strokes	(United States) Sam Burns and (United States) Billy Horschel
6	Jun 26, 2022	Travelers Championship	63-63-67-68=261	−19	2 strokes	(United States) J. T. Poston, (United States) Sahith Theegala
7	Jul 10, 2022	Genesis Scottish Open^{1}	72-65-66-70=273	−7	1 stroke	(United States) Kurt Kitayama
8	May 19, 2024	PGA Championship	62-68-68-65=263	−21	1 stroke	(United States) Bryson DeChambeau
9	Jul 21, 2024	The Open Championship	69-72-69-65=275	−9	2 strokes	(United States) Billy Horschel, (England) Justin Rose
10	Oct 12, 2025	Baycurrent Classic^{2}	71-63-67-64=265	−19	1 stroke	(United States) Max Greyserman

^{1}Co-sanctioned by the European Tour
^{2}Co-sanctioned by the Japan Golf Tour, but unofficial event on that tour.

PGA Tour playoff record (1–2)

No.	Year	Tournament	Opponent(s)	Result
1	2018	WGC-HSBC Champions	(United States) Tony Finau	Won with birdie on first extra hole
2	2019	WGC-HSBC Champions	(Northern Ireland) Rory McIlroy	Lost to birdie on first extra hole
3	2020	Sentry Tournament of Champions	(United States) Patrick Reed, (United States) Justin Thomas	Thomas won with birdie on third extra hole Schauffele eliminated by birdie on first hole

=== European Tour wins (4) ===
Legend
Major championships (2)
World Golf Championships (1)
Rolex Series (1)
Other European Tour (0)

No.	Date	Tournament	Winning score	To par	Margin of victory	Runner(s)-up
1	Oct 28, 2018	WGC-HSBC Champions	66-71-69-68=274	−14	Playoff	(United States) Tony Finau
2	Jul 10, 2022	Genesis Scottish Open^{1}	72-65-66-70=273	−7	1 stroke	(United States) Kurt Kitayama
3	May 19, 2024	PGA Championship	62-68-68-65=263	−21	1 stroke	(United States) Bryson DeChambeau
4	Jul 21, 2024	The Open Championship	69-72-69-65=275	−9	2 strokes	(United States) Billy Horschel, (England) Justin Rose

^{1}Co-sanctioned by the PGA Tour

European Tour playoff record (1–1)

No.	Year	Tournament	Opponent	Result
1	2018	WGC-HSBC Champions	(United States) Tony Finau	Won with birdie on first extra hole
2	2019	WGC-HSBC Champions	(Northern Ireland) Rory McIlroy	Lost to birdie on first extra hole

=== Other wins (3) ===
No.	Date	Tournament	Winning score	To par	Margin of victory	Runner-up
1	Sep 17, 2015	Northern California Open	70-69-65=204	−7	1 stroke	(United States) Brian Thompson
2	Aug 1, 2021	Olympic Games	68-63-68-67=266	−18	1 stroke	(Slovakia) Rory Sabbatini
3	Jul 5, 2022	J. P. McManus Pro-Am	64-70=134	−10	1 stroke	(United States) Sam Burns

== Major championships ==
=== Wins (2) ===
Year	Championship	54 holes	Winning score	Margin	Runner(s)-up
2024	PGA Championship	Tied for lead	−21 (62-68-68-65=263)	1 stroke	(United States) Bryson DeChambeau
2024	The Open Championship	1 shot deficit	−9 (69-72-69-65=275)	2 strokes	(United States) Billy Horschel, (England) Justin Rose

=== Results timeline ===
Results not in chronological order in 2020.

Tournament	2017	2018
Masters Tournament		T50
U.S. Open	T5	T6
The Open Championship	T20	T2
PGA Championship	CUT	T35

Tournament	2019	2020	2021	2022	2023	2024	2025	2026
Masters Tournament	T2	T17	T3	CUT	T10	8	T8	T9
PGA Championship	T16	T10	CUT	T13	T18	1	T28	T7
U.S. Open	T3	5	T7	T14	T10	T7	T12	T11
The Open Championship	T41	NT	T26	T15	T17	1	T7	T18

Win
Top 10
Did not play

CUT = missed the half-way cut
"T" = tied
NT = no tournament due to COVID-19 pandemic

=== Summary ===
Tournament	Wins	2nd	3rd	Top-5	Top-10	Top-25	Events	Cuts made
Masters Tournament	0	1	1	2	6	7	9	8
PGA Championship	1	0	0	1	3	6	10	8
U.S. Open	0	0	1	3	7	10	10	10
The Open Championship	1	1	0	2	3	7	9	9
Totals	2	2	2	8	19	30	38	35

- Most consecutive cuts made – 19 (2022 PGA Championship – 2026 Open Championship, current)
- Longest streak of top-10s – 5 (2024 Masters – 2025 Masters)

== Results in The Players Championship ==
Tournament	2018	2019	2020	2021	2022	2023	2024	2025	2026
The Players Championship	T2	CUT	C	CUT	CUT	T19	T2	72	3

Top 10

CUT = missed the halfway cut
"T" indicates a tie for a place
C = canceled after the first round due to the COVID-19 pandemic

== World Golf Championships ==
=== Wins (1) ===
Year	Championship	54 holes	Winning score	Margin	Runner-up
2018	WGC-HSBC Champions	3 shot deficit	−14 (66-71-69-68=274)	Playoff	(United States) Tony Finau

=== Results timeline ===
Tournament	2017	2018	2019	2020	2021	2022	2023
Championship		T18	T14	T14	T39		
Match Play		T17	T24	NT^{1}	T18	T35	QF
Invitational	T17	68	T27	T6	T46		
Champions	T46	1	2	NT^{1}	NT^{1}	NT^{1}	

^{1}Canceled due to COVID-19 pandemic

Win
Top 10
Did not play

NT = No tournament
"T" = Tied
QF, R16, R32, R64 = Round in which player lost in match play
Note that the Championship and Invitational were discontinued from 2022. The Champions was discontinued from 2023.

== PGA Tour career summary ==
Season	Starts	Cuts made	Wins	2nd	3rd	Top-10	Top-25	Best finish	Earnings ($)	Money list rank	FedEx Cup rank	Scoring avg (adj)	Scoring rank
2016	2	0	0	0	0	0	0	CUT	-	-	-	-	-
2017	28	20	2	0	0	4	11	1	4,312,674	12	3	70.16	27
2018	27	22	0	2	2	7	12	2	4,047,538	18	15	70.49	55
2019	21	18	2	2	1	6	14	1	5,609,456	6	2	69.834	11
2020	18	17	0	3	1	7	16	2	3,813,636	11	2	69.227	5
2021	22	20	0	3	1	8	16	2	5,240,653	12	5	69.859	7
2022	21	19	3	0	2	7	15	1	7,427,299	6	4	69.462	5
2023	23	23	0	2	1	11	18	2	8,459,066	10	2	69.127	5
Career*	162	139	7	12	8	50	102	1	38,910,322	25			

* As of the 2023 season

== European Tour career summary ==
Season	Starts	Cuts made	Wins	2nd	3rd	Top-10	Top-25	Earnings (€)	Order of Merit rank
2017	5	5	0	0	0	1	3	623,383	0
2018	9	9	1	1	0	3	6	2,779,425	4
2019	7	7	0	1	1	2	5	1,700,119	10
2020	5	5	0	0	0	3	5	1,162,319	N/A - not enough events to qualify
Career*	26	26	1	2	1	9	19		

* As of December 31, 2020. Note that there is double counting of money and finishes for majors and World Golf Championships between PGA Tour and European Tour stats.

== U.S. national team appearances ==
Professional

- Presidents Cup: 2019 (winners), 2022 (winners), 2024 (winners), 2026 (winners)
- Ryder Cup: 2021 (winners), 2023, 2025

Ryder Cup points record
2021	2023	2025	Total
3	1	3	7

== See also ==
- 2016 Web.com Tour Finals graduates
