= Richard Schauffele =

German footballer (1903–1983)

Personal information
- Nickname: Molly
- National team: Germany
- Born: 26 January 1903 Cannstatt, Germany
- Died: 5 February 1983 (aged 80) Stuttgart, Germany
- Monument: Molly-Schauffele-Sporthalle
- Height: 6 ft 8 in (203 cm)
- Weight: 210 lb (95 kg)
Association football career
- Position: Center forward
Youth career
- VfB Stuttgart
Senior career*
Years	Team	Apps	(Gls)
1919–1927	VfB Stuttgart		
- * Club domestic league appearances and goals

Sport
- Sport: Track and Field
- Events: Shot-put, Javelin, Discus
- Club: Stuttgarter Kickers, Cannstatter Ruderclub, VfB Stuttgart
- Updated on 21 June 2017

Richard Schauffele (26 January 1903 – 5 February 1983) was a German engineer, track athlete, footballer, politician, and sports personality.

== Life ==
In his youth up to his mid-twenties, the civil engineer by trade played football for the VfB Stuttgart. At the age of 25, Schauffele switched over to track & field and never looked back.

From 1919 to 1927, Schauffele played football on the first squad of the VfB Stuttgart and, In 1927, won the Southern German championship title with the VfB Stuttgart. However, the team failed to reach the finals for the German championships.

The year 1927 marked the end of Schauffele's football career, who, from hereon, was focused on developing his talents in the throwing disciplines of track and field. At a height of 6'8", Schauffele was a giant of his time and an exceptionally gifted athlete. He successfully competed in national championships up to the age of 40 and was able to garner 32 state and regional championship titles in discus, javelin, shot-put and ball throwing (now no longer a competitive discipline). In 1935, Schauffele's efforts were rewarded when winning the German national team title with the Stuttgarter Kickers.

One of Schauffele's great-grandsons, Xander is an American professional golfer.

== Positions and responsibilities ==
- From 1948 to 1950 Schauffele was president of the Stuttgarter Kickers.
- In the years 1951–1954, as well as 1959–1965 Schauffele was a founding member, chairman and president of the Wuerttemberg Athletic Federation (WLV).
- Beginning in 1954 up until his death in 1983 Schauffele held the title of "honorary president" of the WLV. Schauffele was instrumental in installing the first tartan track in Germany in the Stuttgart Stadium, thus attracting large international track and field competitions to Stuttgart.
- In 1959 Schauffele was elected to the Stuttgart city council, where under the city's legendary lord mayor Arnulf Klett he was acting vice mayor.

== Achievements in sports ==
- 1927 Southern German soccer champion with the VfB Stuttgart
- 1928 Qualified for the German team for the Olympic games in Amsterdam (discus), but could not start because of an injury
- 1935 German Track and field team champion with the Stuttgarter Kickers
- 32x track and field titles in shot-put, discus, javelin and ball throw
- 1936 head judge for all track and field throwing disciplines at the Olympic games in Berlin

== Accolades ==
- 1950 German Athletics Association (DLV) "Pin of honor" in Gold
- 1965 German Athletics Association (DLV) "Hanns Braun Memorial Prize"
- 1970 German Athletics Association (DLV) "Ring of honor"
- 1976 Distinguished Service Order of the state Baden-Württemberg
- honorary naming of the Olympic training center Stuttgart to "Molly Schauffele Sporthalle"

== See also ==
- Cannstatt Travertin Quarry
- Xander Schauffele
