= Tony Finau =

American professional golfer (born 1989)

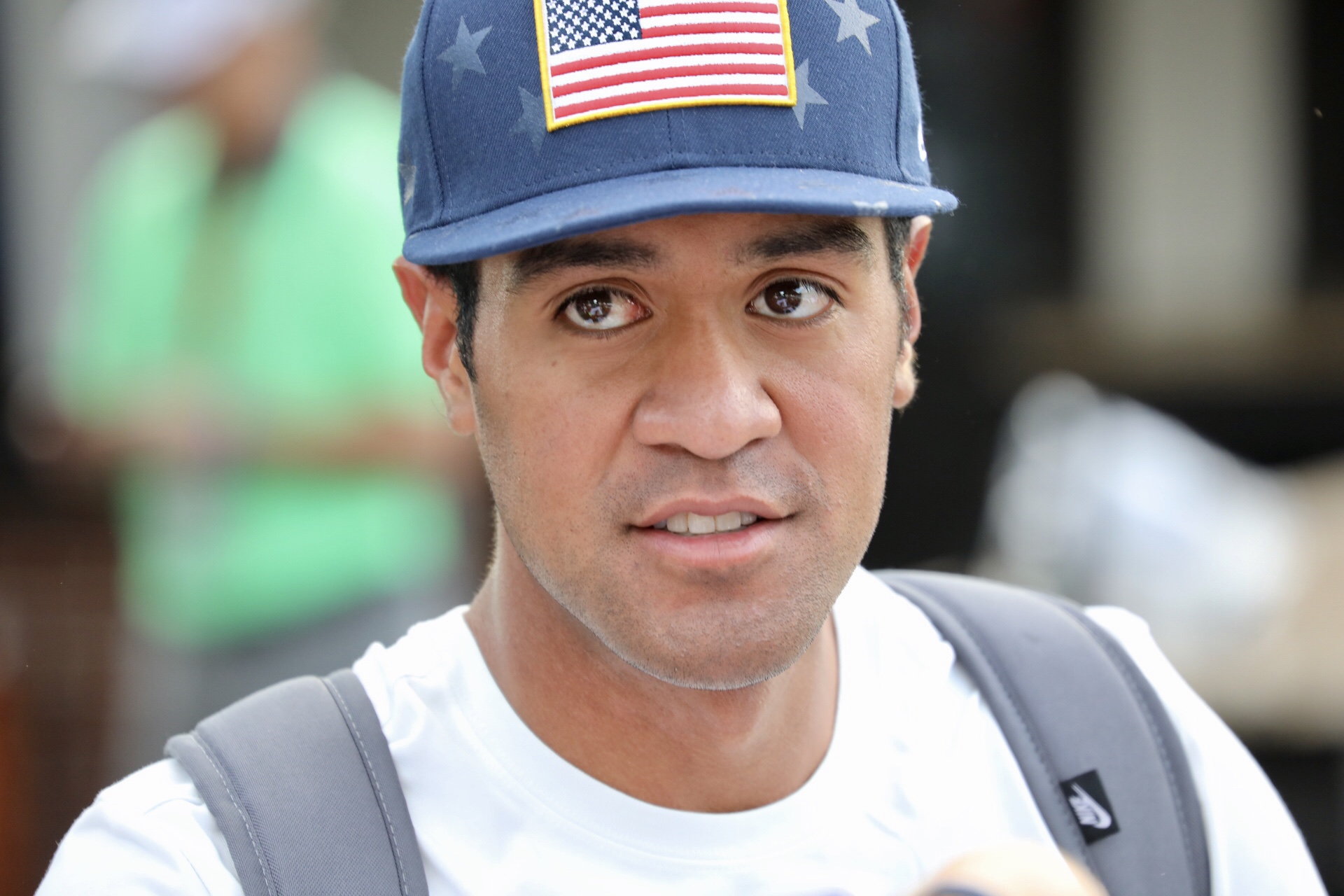
- Finau in 2018

Personal information
- Full name: Milton Pouha Finau
- Nicknames: Tony, Big Tone
- Nationality: United States
- Born: September 14, 1989 (age 37) Salt Lake City, Utah, U.S.
- Height: 6 ft 4 in (1.93 m)
- Weight: 200 lb (91 kg; 14 st)
- Spouse: Alayna Galea’i (m. 2012)
- Children: 6

Career
- Sport: Golf
- Turned professional: 2007
- Current tours: PGA Tour; European Tour
- Former tours: Web.com Tour; PGA Tour Canada
- Professional wins: 9
- Highest ranking: 9 (December 2, 2018) (as of October 25, 2026)

Number of wins by tour
- PGA Tour: 6
- Korn Ferry Tour: 1
- Other: 2

Best results in major championships
- Masters Tournament: T5: 2019
- PGA Championship: T4: 2020
- U.S. Open: T3: 2024
- The Open Championship: 3rd: 2019

Milton Pouha "Tony" Finau (born September 14, 1989) is an American professional golfer who currently plays on the PGA Tour.

== Early life and amateur career ==
Milton Pouha Finau was born on September 14, 1989, in Salt Lake City, Utah. He attended West High School. He won the Utah State Amateur Championship in 2006, defeating future PGA Tour player Daniel Summerhays in the 36-hole championship match.

== Professional career ==
Although Finau had college scholarship offers in basketball, he turned professional at the age of 17 and began playing on mini-tours including the Gateway Tour, NGA Hooters Tour, and National Pro Tour. Finau and his brother Gipper competed on the Golf Channel's The Big Break in 2009. Finau finished second on Big Break Disney Golf.

Finau played on the PGA Tour Canada in 2013, making seven cuts in eight starts. He finished T-3 at the 2013 Web.com Tour qualifying school to earn his Web.com Tour card for 2014. He won his first title in August 2014 at the Stonebrae Classic. He finished 8th in the regular season, and 12th in the Web.com Tour Finals to earn his PGA Tour card for the 2014–15 season.

In March 2016, Finau won his maiden title on the PGA Tour at the Puerto Rico Open. He won in a sudden death playoff over Steve Marino with a birdie on the third extra hole. He had earlier missed a putt for the victory outright on the 72nd green. The result moved Finau into the top 25 in the FedEx Cup standings. Finau opted not to defend his Puerto Rico title in 2017, instead taking his chances to get into the field at the 2017 WGC-Dell Technologies Match Play, but was two players short of entering the field, which takes the top 64 available players from the Official World Golf Ranking.

=== 2018 ===
Finau qualified for the first three majors in 2018, including his first Masters appearance, by making it to the Tour Championship in 2017. He finished in a tie for 10th place at the 2018 Masters, despite dislocating his ankle in the Par-3 contest the day before the first round. In June 2018, Finau finished in 5th place at the U.S. Open after a double-bogey on the 18th hole, his highest finish to date in a major tournament. Finau finished the 2018 PGA Tour season ranked sixth in the season-long FedEx Cup. He earned over $5,600,000 in the 2017–18 season with 11 top-10 finishes. His best finishes in the season were second at the Safeway Open and The Northern Trust. He also finished T2 at the Genesis Open.

In September 2018, U.S. team captain Jim Furyk named Finau as a captain's pick for the 2018 Ryder Cup at Le Golf National outside of Paris, France. The U.S. lost the Ryder Cup to the European side 17 1/2 to 10 1/2. Finau finished with a 2-1-0 record and won his singles match over Tommy Fleetwood (6 and 4). Up till then Fleetwood had gone 4-0-0 in the fourball and foursome matches (with partner Francesco Molinari).

=== 2018–19 PGA Tour season ===
On October 28, 2018, Finau lost a playoff against Xander Schauffele in the WGC-HSBC Champions. He still won more than $1,000,000 by finishing second. In April, Finau was in the final group of the 2019 Masters Tournament with Francesco Molinari and Tiger Woods. He ended the tournament tied for 5th.

=== 2019–20 PGA Tour season ===
In December 2019, Finau played on the U.S. team at the 2019 Presidents Cup at Royal Melbourne Golf Club in Australia. The U.S. team won 16–14. Finau went 0–1–3 and halved his Sunday singles match against Hideki Matsuyama.

In February 2020, Finau lost the Waste Management Phoenix Open in a sudden death playoff to Webb Simpson. Finau, who lost to Simpson's birdie on the first extra hole, had held a two stroke lead with two holes to play, but Simpson finished with consecutive birdies to force the playoff.

In July at the Memorial Tournament, Finau held a four-stroke lead in the third round before faltering on the back nine with two double bogeys. His struggles continued on Sunday, including a triple bogey on the par-four sixth hole, ultimately shooting six over par on the day and finishing the tournament in eighth place, two under par. A week later, Finau's T-3 placing at the 3M Open meant that he now shares the PGA Tour record (30) for the most top-10 finishes in a four-year period without a win.

=== 2020–21 PGA Tour season: Second win after five years ===
In early 2021, Finau had a stretch of five weeks where he finished in the top 4 in all four tournaments that he entered. He finished fourth at The American Express, tied second at the Farmers Insurance Open, tied second at the Saudi International on the European Tour and he lost in a playoff to Max Homa at the Genesis Invitational at Riviera Country Club in Pacific Palisades, California. Finau won the 2021 Northern Trust, beating Cameron Smith in a playoff.

In September 2021, Finau played on the U.S. team in the 2021 Ryder Cup at Whistling Straits in Kohler, Wisconsin. The U.S. team won 19–9 and Finau went 1–2–0 including a loss in his Sunday singles match against Ian Poulter.

=== 2021–22 PGA Tour season ===
In July 2022, Finau won the 3M Open and the Rocket Mortgage Classic in successive weeks; his third and fourth victories on PGA Tour.

=== 2022–23 PGA Tour season ===
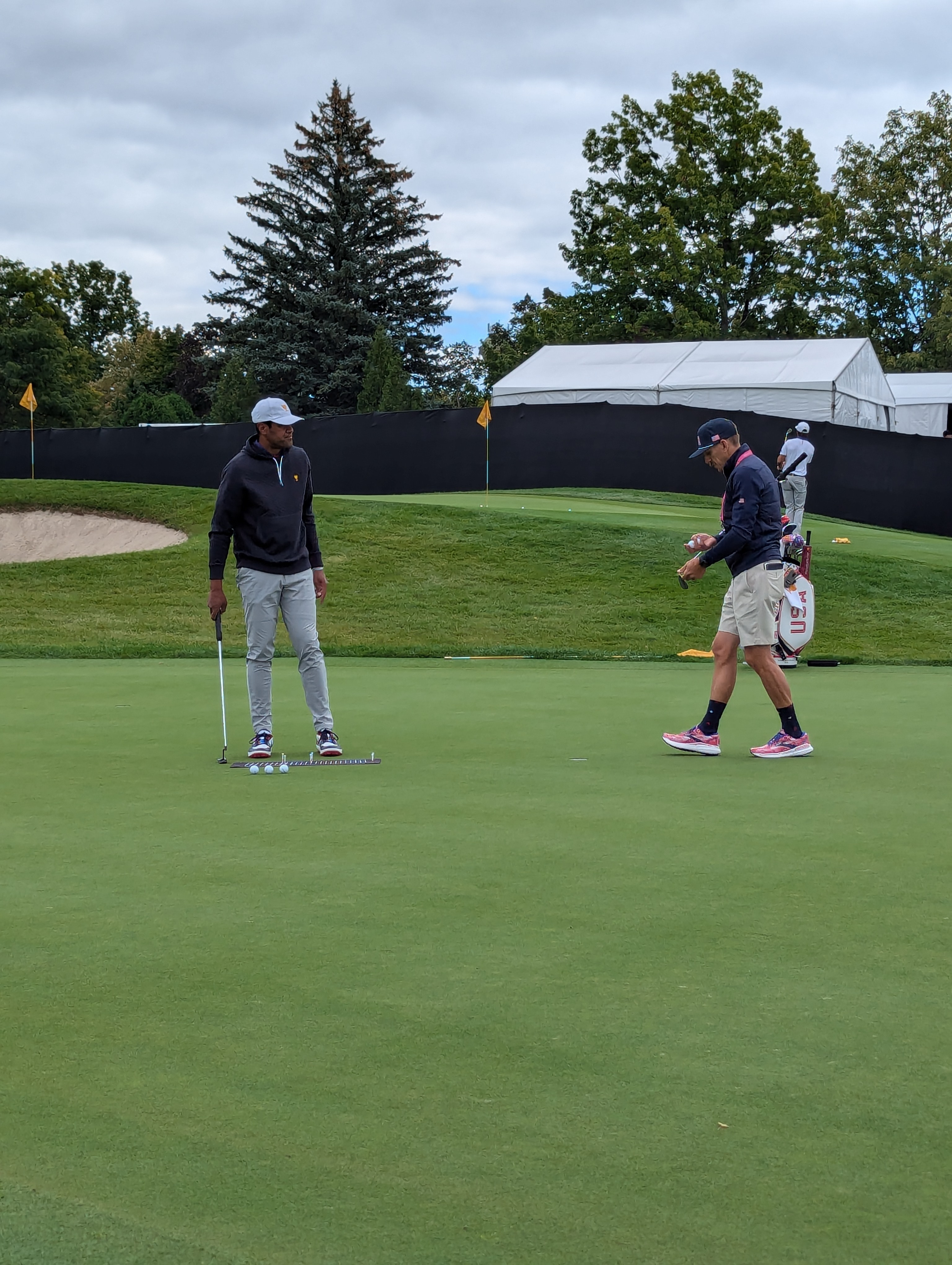
Finau on the practice green at the 2024 Presidents Cup.

Finau qualified for the U.S. team at the 2022 Presidents Cup; he won three and lost one of his matches. In November 2022, Finau won the Cadence Bank Houston Open for his third PGA Tour victory of the calendar year. In April 2023, Finau won the Mexico Open for his sixth career PGA Tour victory.

== Personal life ==
Finau is of Tongan and Samoan descent, the first person of such ancestry to play on the PGA Tour. Finau's brother Gipper made the cut in the Utah EnergySolutions Championship at the age of 16 but did not succeed as a tournament professional. He is the cousin of NBA basketball player Jabari Parker and former NFL football player Haloti Ngata.

Finau runs the Tony Finau Foundation, an organization aimed at empowering youth and their families in the local community. He is a member of the Church of Jesus Christ of Latter-day Saints. He and his wife, Alayna Finau, have six children. Finau appears in the sports documentary series Full Swing, which premiered on Netflix on February 15, 2023.

== Professional wins (9) ==
=== PGA Tour wins (6) ===
Legend
FedEx Cup playoff events (1)
Other PGA Tour (5)

No.	Date	Tournament	Winning score	To par	Margin of victory	Runner(s)-up
1	Mar 27, 2016	Puerto Rico Open	69-70-67-70=276	−12	Playoff	(United States) Steve Marino
2	Aug 23, 2021	The Northern Trust	67-64-68-65=264	−20	Playoff	(Australia) Cameron Smith
3	Jul 24, 2022	3M Open	67-68-65-67=267	−17	3 strokes	(Argentina) Emiliano Grillo, (South Korea) Im Sung-jae
4	Jul 31, 2022	Rocket Mortgage Classic	64-66-65-67=262	−26	5 strokes	(United States) Patrick Cantlay, (Canada) Taylor Pendrith, (United States) Cameron Young
5	Nov 13, 2022	Cadence Bank Houston Open	65-62-68-69=264	−16	4 strokes	(United States) Tyson Alexander
6	Apr 30, 2023	Mexico Open	65-64-65-66=260	−24	3 strokes	(Spain) Jon Rahm

PGA Tour playoff record (2–3)

No.	Year	Tournament	Opponent	Result
1	2016	Puerto Rico Open	(United States) Steve Marino	Won with birdie on third extra hole
2	2018	WGC-HSBC Champions	(United States) Xander Schauffele	Lost to birdie on first extra hole
3	2020	Waste Management Phoenix Open	(United States) Webb Simpson	Lost to birdie on first extra hole
4	2021	Genesis Invitational	(United States) Max Homa	Lost to par on second extra hole
5	2021	The Northern Trust	(Australia) Cameron Smith	Won with par on first extra hole

=== Web.com Tour wins (1) ===
No.	Date	Tournament	Winning score	To par	Margin of victory	Runners-up
1	Aug 3, 2014	Stonebrae Classic	67-62-63-66=267	−22	3 strokes	(United States) Daniel Berger, (Argentina) Fabián Gómez, (United States) Zack Sucher

=== National Pro Tour wins (2) ===
No.	Date	Tournament	Winning score	To par	Margin of victory	Runner-up
1	Apr 13, 2012	Hall of Fame Classic	66-67-71-65=269	−19	3 strokes	(United States) Michael Welch
2	Apr 20, 2012	Atlantic Open	70-67-69-69=275	−13	4 strokes	(United States) Scott Harrington

== Playoff record ==
European Tour playoff record (0–1)

No.	Year	Tournament	Opponent	Result
1	2018	WGC-HSBC Champions	(United States) Xander Schauffele	Lost to birdie on first extra hole

== Results in major championships ==
Results not in chronological order in 2020.

Tournament	2015	2016	2017	2018
Masters Tournament				T10
U.S. Open	T14	CUT		5
The Open Championship		T18	T27	T9
PGA Championship	T10	CUT	T44	T42

Tournament	2019	2020	2021	2022	2023	2024	2025
Masters Tournament	T5	T38	T10	T35	T26	T55	CUT
PGA Championship	T64	T4	T8	T30	T72	T18	T19
U.S. Open	CUT	T8	CUT	CUT	T32	T3	T38
The Open Championship	3	NT	T15	T28	CUT	CUT	T56

Top 10
Did not play

CUT = missed the half-way cut
"T" indicates a tie for a place
NT = no tournament due to COVID-19 pandemic

=== Summary ===
Tournament	Wins	2nd	3rd	Top-5	Top-10	Top-25	Events	Cuts made
Masters Tournament	0	0	0	1	3	3	8	7
PGA Championship	0	0	0	1	3	5	11	10
U.S. Open	0	0	1	2	3	4	10	6
The Open Championship	0	0	1	1	2	4	9	7
Totals	0	0	2	5	11	16	38	30

- Most consecutive cuts made – 8 (2017 Open – 2019 PGA)
- Longest streak of top-10s – 3 (twice)

== Results in The Players Championship ==
Tournament	2016	2017	2018	2019	2020	2021	2022	2023	2024	2025	2026
The Players Championship	CUT	CUT	T57	T22	C	CUT	CUT	T19	T45	CUT	T70

CUT = missed the halfway cut
"T" indicates a tie for a place
C = canceled after the first round due to the COVID-19 pandemic

== Results in World Golf Championships ==
Tournament	2017	2018	2019	2020	2021	2022	2023
Championship		T27	T25		14		
Match Play		T17	T40	NT^{1}	T28	T35	T17
Invitational		T10	T27	T65	T34		
Champions	T11	2	T53	NT^{1}	NT^{1}	NT^{1}	

^{1}Cancelled due to COVID-19 pandemic

Top 10
Did not play

NT = No tournament
"T" = Tied
Note that the Championship and Invitational were discontinued from 2022. The Champions was discontinued from 2023.

== U.S. national team appearances ==
Amateur

- Junior Ryder Cup: 2004, 2006

Professional

- Ryder Cup: 2018, 2021 (winners)
- Presidents Cup: 2019 (winners), 2022 (winners), 2024 (winners)

== See also ==
- 2014 Web.com Tour Finals graduates
