= Marco Simone Golf and Country Club =

Golf course in Guidonia, Rome, Italy

- Location in Rome Location in Lazio Location in Italy
- 41°57′39″N 12°38′04″E

Club information
- Location: Guidonia, Rome, Italy
- Type: Public
- Owner: Gianni Cigna and Laura Biagiotti
- Tota holes: 27
- Tournaments: Italian Open (1994, 2021–2023); 2023 Ryder Cup
- Website: golfmarcosimone.com

Course Campionato (Championship Course)
- Designed by: Jim Fazio & David Mezzacane; Redesign: European Golf Design & Tom Fazio II
- Par: 72
- Length: 6,343 m (6,937 yd)
- Slope rating: 140

Course Nord (Resort Course)
- Designed by: Jim Fazio & David Mezzacane
- Par: 32 (9 hole course)
- Length: 2,060 m (2,250 yd)

Marco Simone Golf and Country Club (also known as Golf Marco Simone) is a golf course in Guidonia, Rome, Italy. It is 10 miles from the city centre of Rome and has 2 golf courses, an 18-hole Championship Course and a 9-hole Resort Course. It hosted the 2023 Ryder Cup.

== History ==
The golf club was named after the castle of Marco Simone. The castle was a Roman fortified manor farm. The tower was built approximately in the year 1000 and later in the Middle Ages additional buildings built around it.

In the 1970s Laura Biagiotti, the Italian high fashion designer, and her husband Gianni Cigna both lived in the restored castle. By 1989 the golf course had been designed and built. The architects were Jim Fazio and David Mezzacane. The golf course has hosted the Italian Open golf championships four times, most recently in 2023, when Adrian Meronk won with an aggregate score of 271.

Course Campionato
Tee	Rating/Slope	1	2	3	4	5	6	7	8	9	Out	10	11	12	13	14	15	16	17	18	In	Total
Men Pro	72.4 / 140	501	170	490	343	157	323	406	373	389	3152	342	179	476	378	385	330	501	179	421	3191	6343
Men	72.4 / 137	487	146	477	329	153	314	388	350	356	2999	322	169	459	365	375	304	483	162	399	3038	6037
Women Pro	75.4 / 138	445	135	440	304	140	285	361	309	344	2763	313	153	442	337	350	294	445	145	374	2853	5616
Women	73.5 / 134	400	130	428	295	130	275	350	284	334	2626	300	135	422	327	336	275	425	124	350	2694	5320
Par		5	3	5	4	3	4	4	4	4	36	4	3	5	4	4	4	5	3	4	36	72
SI	All Tees	9	17	5	7	15	11	1	13	3		10	12	14	8	6	16	2	18	4

=== 2023 Ryder Cup ===
Ryder Cup Europe only received four bids for the 2022 Ryder Cup when the bidding closed on 30 April 2015. On 14 December 2015, Rome announced that it was to host the 2022 Ryder Cup, beating off bids from Germany, Austria and Spain. On 8 July 2020, the PGA Tour announced that the 2020 Ryder Cup was postponed by one year due to the impact of the COVID-19 pandemic. This consequently pushed to 2022 Ryder Cup back one year to 2023. Europe won the 2023 Ryder Cup 16^{1}/_{2}-11^{1}/_{2}, regaining it from the United States.

2023 Ryder Cup Course
Tee	Rating/Slope	1	2	3	4	5	6	7	8	9	Out	10	11	12	13	14	15	16	17	18	In	Total
Mens (yards)	–	445	506	453	188	302	381	222	525	587	3609	453	329	546	150	509	479	303	206	597	3572	7181
Mens (metres)	–	407	463	414	172	276	348	203	480	537	3300	414	301	499	137	465	438	277	188	546	3265	6565
Par		4	4	4	3	4	4	3	4	5	35	4	4	5	3	4	4	4	3	5	36	71
