= Quogue Historic District =

Historic district at the East End of Long Island, New York

- U.S. National Register of Historic Places
- U.S. Historic district
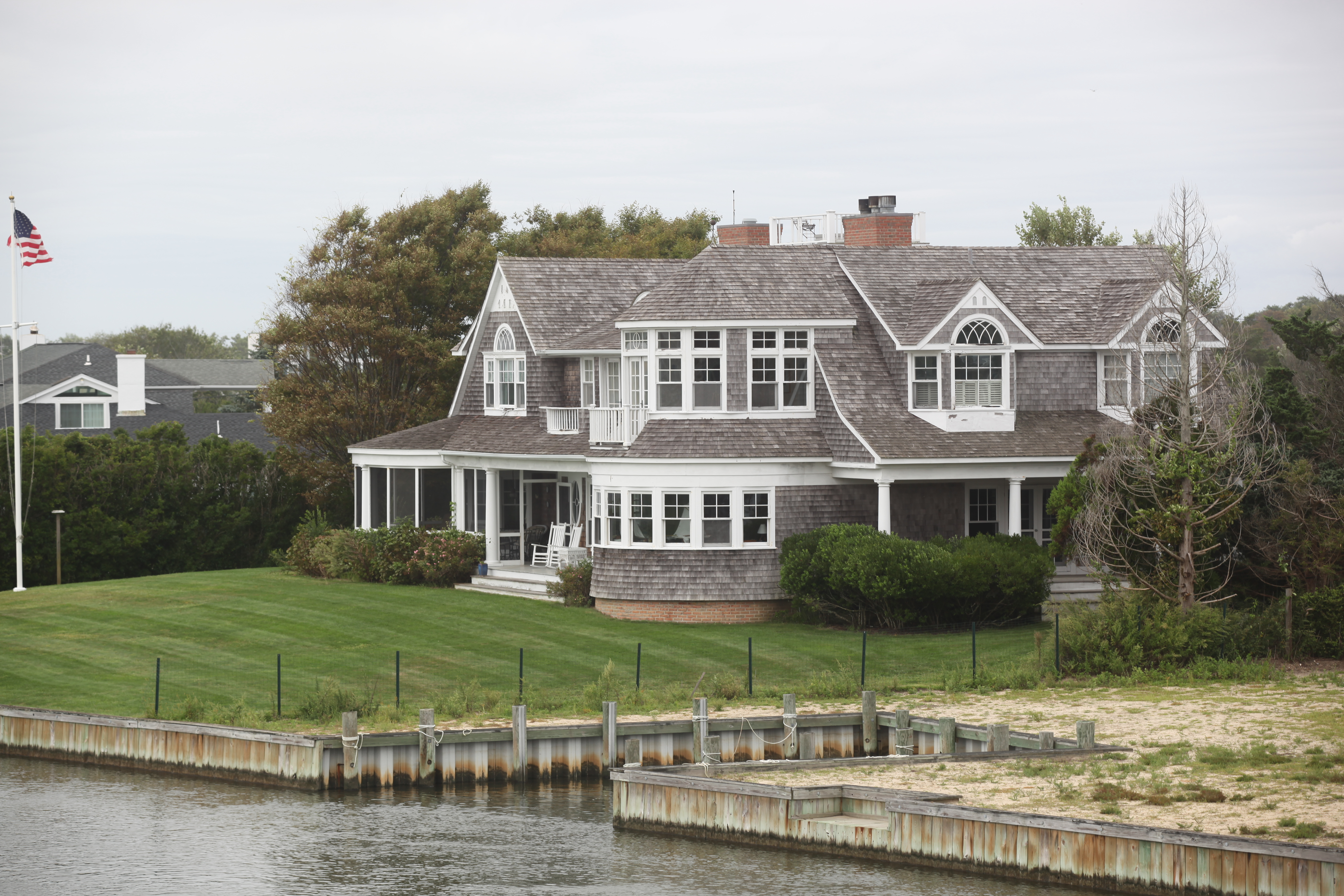
- Shingle-style Home on Quogue Canal

- Location within New York Location within the United States
- Location: Quogue St., Quogue, New York
- Coordinates: 40°48′26″N 72°36′0″W
- Area: more than fifty acres
- Built: 1659
- Architectural style: Shingle Style
- NRHP reference No.: 15001028
- Added to NRHP: Feb 2, 2016

The Quogue Historic District is an area of historic residences in Quogue on the East End of Long Island, New York. The historic houses include structures that date from the 18th, 19th and early 20th centuries and retain their architectural and historic integrity. The district was listed in the National Register of Historic Places as a historic district in 2016.

== Early history ==
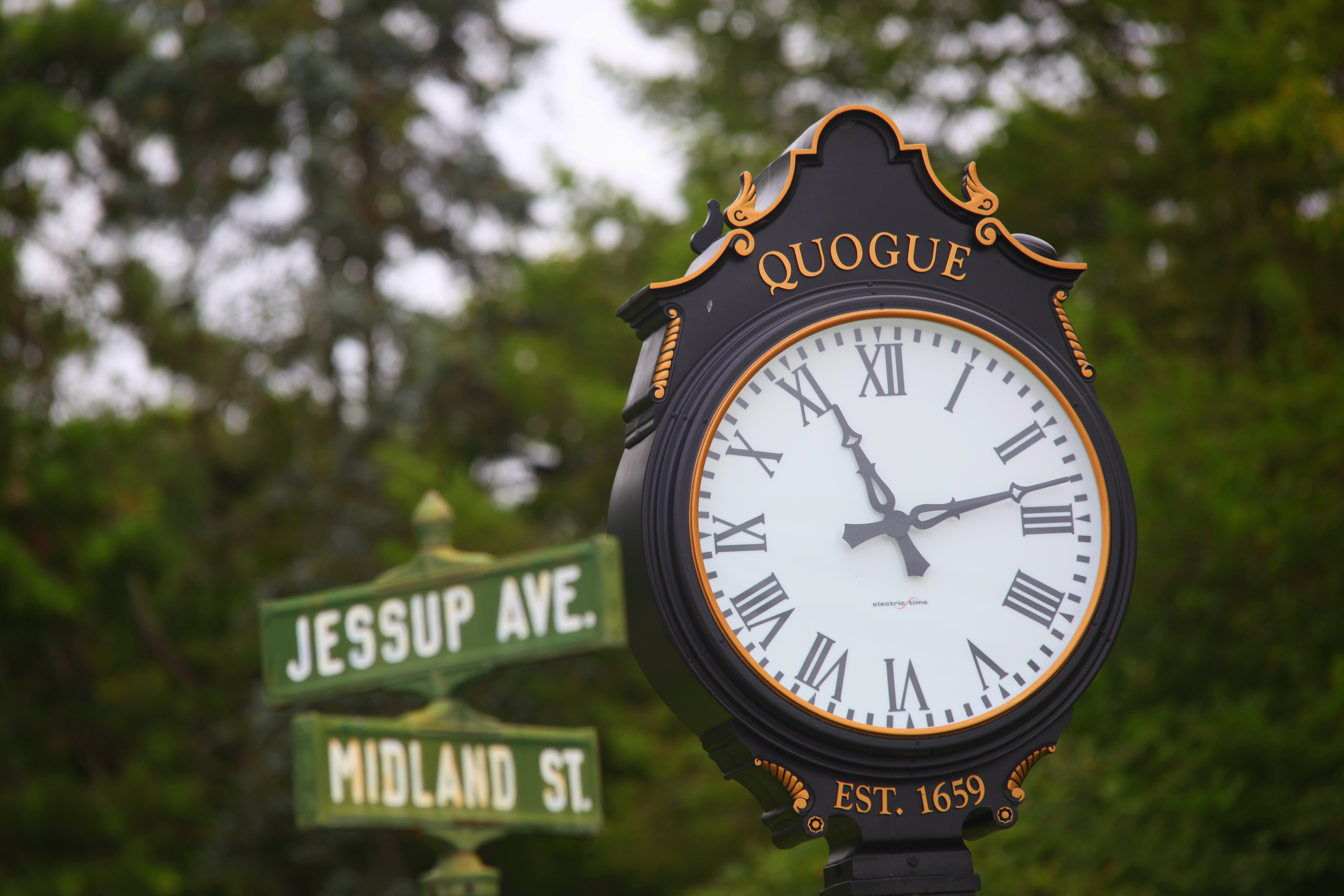
Jessup Ave & Midland St Clock

In 1659 John Ogden purchased Quawcanantucke from Sachem Wyandanch of the Montauk tribe for 400 pounds, vouchsafing his friend access for hunting, fishing and gathering berries. That land, from Westhampton to Southampton was to secure grazing for the sheep, hogs and cattle of the town and the first structure there was built for the shepherd that tended John Foster's flock. By the mid-18th century, the grandsons of Southampton's original settlers became the founders of the Quogue settlement. The Cook, Foster, Herrick, Jessup, Howell, and Post families started building homes along Quogue Street.

Once a bucolic collection of farms by the sea, Quogue in the early 20th century had become a place for wealthy bon vivants to create country estates by purchasing whole farms and building cottages along the dunes. Families that had summered in one of its boarding houses came to stay, many building the now-iconic shingle covered homes that dot the streets. Over 250 such shingle-style homes make up the historic hamlet.

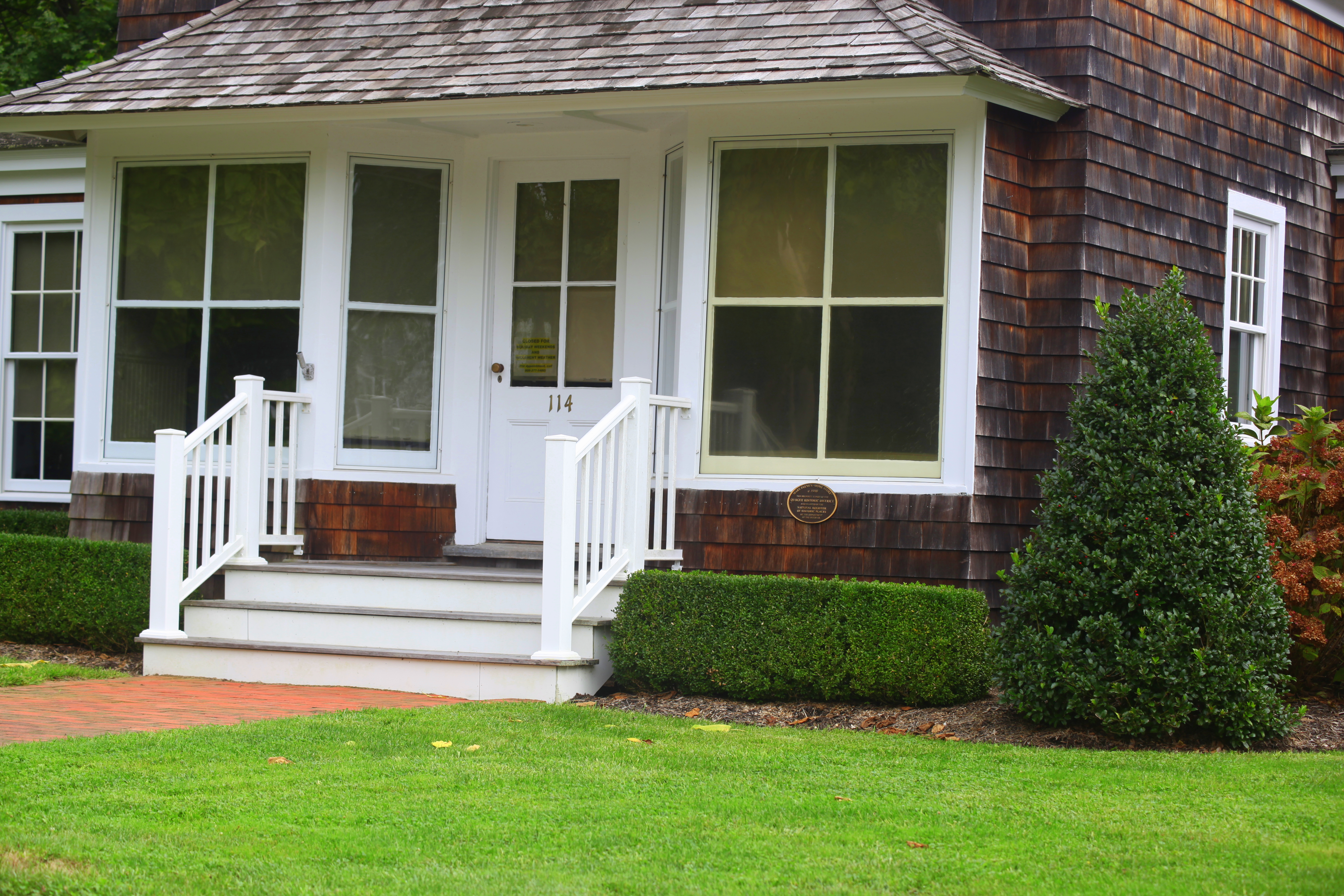
Mary Paynes store

Part of Southampton Towne in 1850, home to the first modern bridge over Quantuck Bay, Quogue was the second overnight stop on the stagecoach run from Brooklyn to Southampton in 1835, before the arrival of the LIRR (Riverhead -1844) during the Victorian era rush to colonize the Hamptons. Steamships plied stately courses off the Atlantic coast and homes built by whalers had dominated Quogue and Quaquanantuck streets. Jessup Avenue served as the main commercial street with the country market and the fire dept setting up roots in 1870. Early inhabitants include the linen house and the store by the pond, now home to the Quogue Historical society. Quogue Street, the widest in the hamlet, had been the grazing path that cattle were driven down each spring.

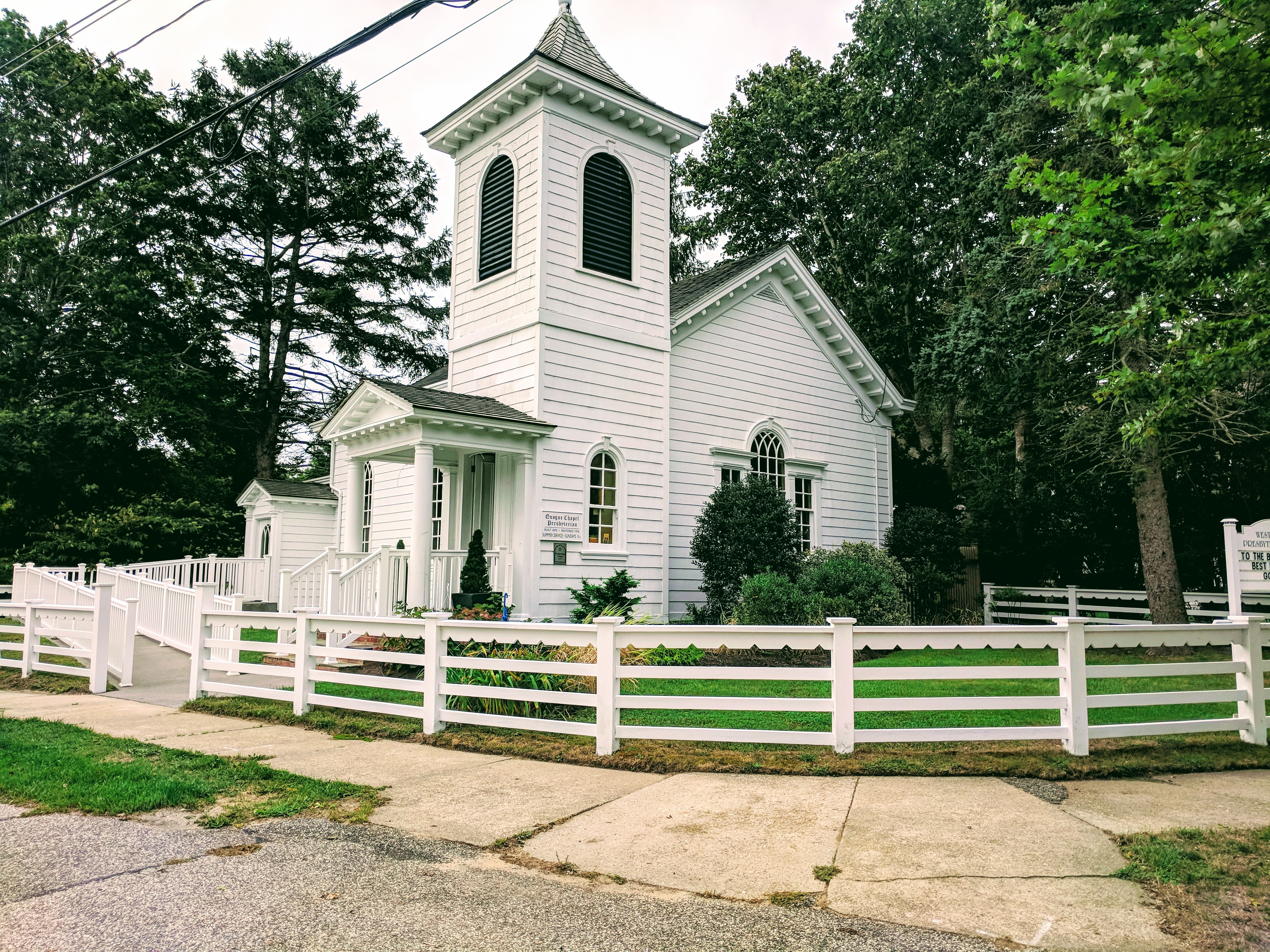
Shingle-style Church Chapel 20180914

By 1845, whaling had become the country's fifth largest cash crop as the demand for whale oil for lighting grew. In Quogue, some families invested in the voyages; others signed aboard the whalers as crew; and a fair number became captains of their own vessels.

Some of these included residents Frederick M. Hallock, Henry Gardiner, Edward Stevens, and members of the Cooper family.

Until then, Quogue was a quiet, pastoral community. Each small holding grew food for the table, some were working by farming, ocean fishing and then whaling, starting in small whaleboats from shore, then in Barks and Schooners on long ocean voyages. A secondary business of boarding summer visitors was thriving by 1855.

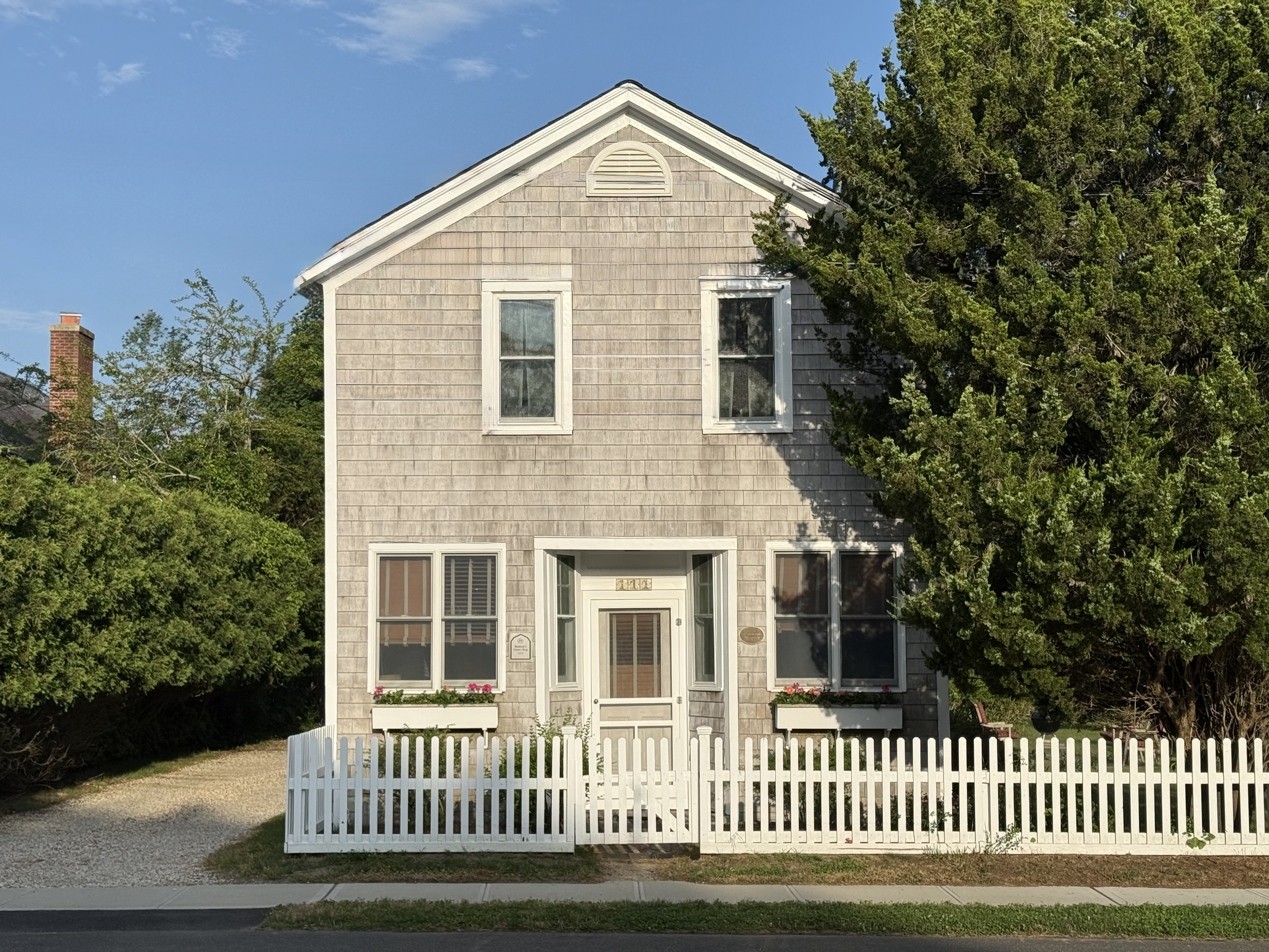
Haddad's Linen Store, established in 1912, currently a private home on Jessup Avenue

In 1870, a spur of the LIRR to Quogue brought a flood of visitors each summer and, by 1880, the hamlet was a bustling summer resort. Thirteen boarding houses and hotels ensconced along Quogue Street and the village flourished. The cottages on Dune road were large affairs, built to accommodate the seasonal influx of beach goers. It was by then considered the wealthiest village on Long Island by proportion of its residents. It was nicknamed “The Queen of the Hamptons” by the LIRR.

== Gales and Nor’easters ==
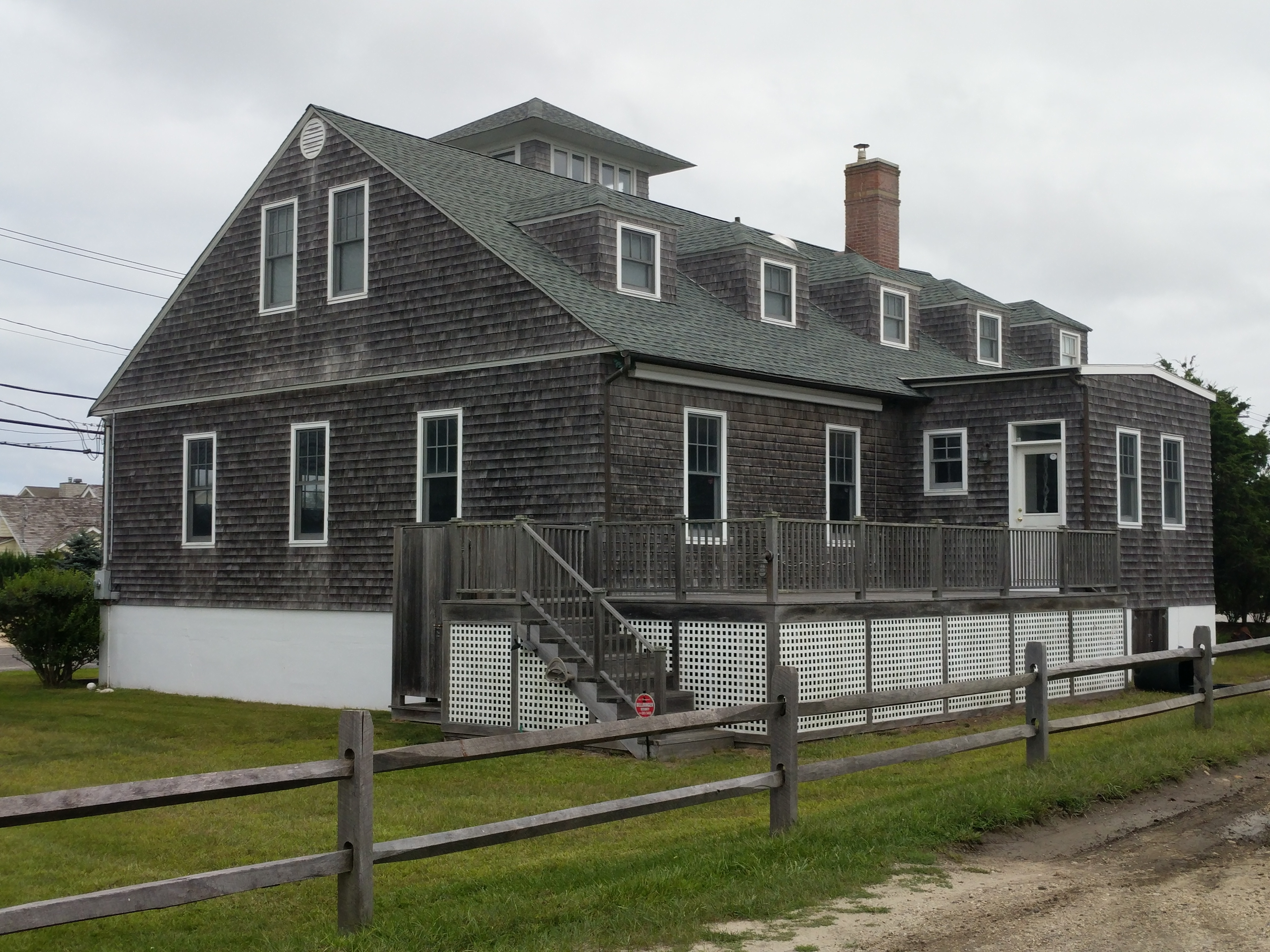
Quogue Life-Saving station, currently a private home on Dune Rd.

On the high seas nor’easters might be the most terrifying of the dangers, but thousands lost their souls to the sea within sight of shore. Nestled among the dunes during the middle of the 19th century was a garage like structure, long gone. It was once the shed that was used by the Quogue Life-Saving Station (NRHP ref# 99000640) before the quarters were upgraded in 1872 to a larger red house. The red house still remains on Dune Road as a private home after the quarters were moved in 1912. The original shed was in use from 1849 to 1872 and involved Maritime disasters. The poet Longfellow famously wrote in 1839 of The Wreck of the Hesperus, a tale of a winter storm and ill-fated voyage off the Atlantic coast of which Long Islands had its own share; and the need for coast watchers and seagoing rescue crafts had spawned life-saving stations along the south shore. Wrecks such as the “Infanti” (1851), the “Europa” (1886) and Nahum Chapin (1898) gave notoriety to the Quogue lifesaving station and it became a part of the US Coast guard in 1915.

The latest station (Designed by Victor Mendelheff – 1912, currently a private home) is one of the few remaining examples of this type of structure and was the only individual building in the Quogue Historic District on the NRHP lists, despite being outside the limits of the district boundaries.

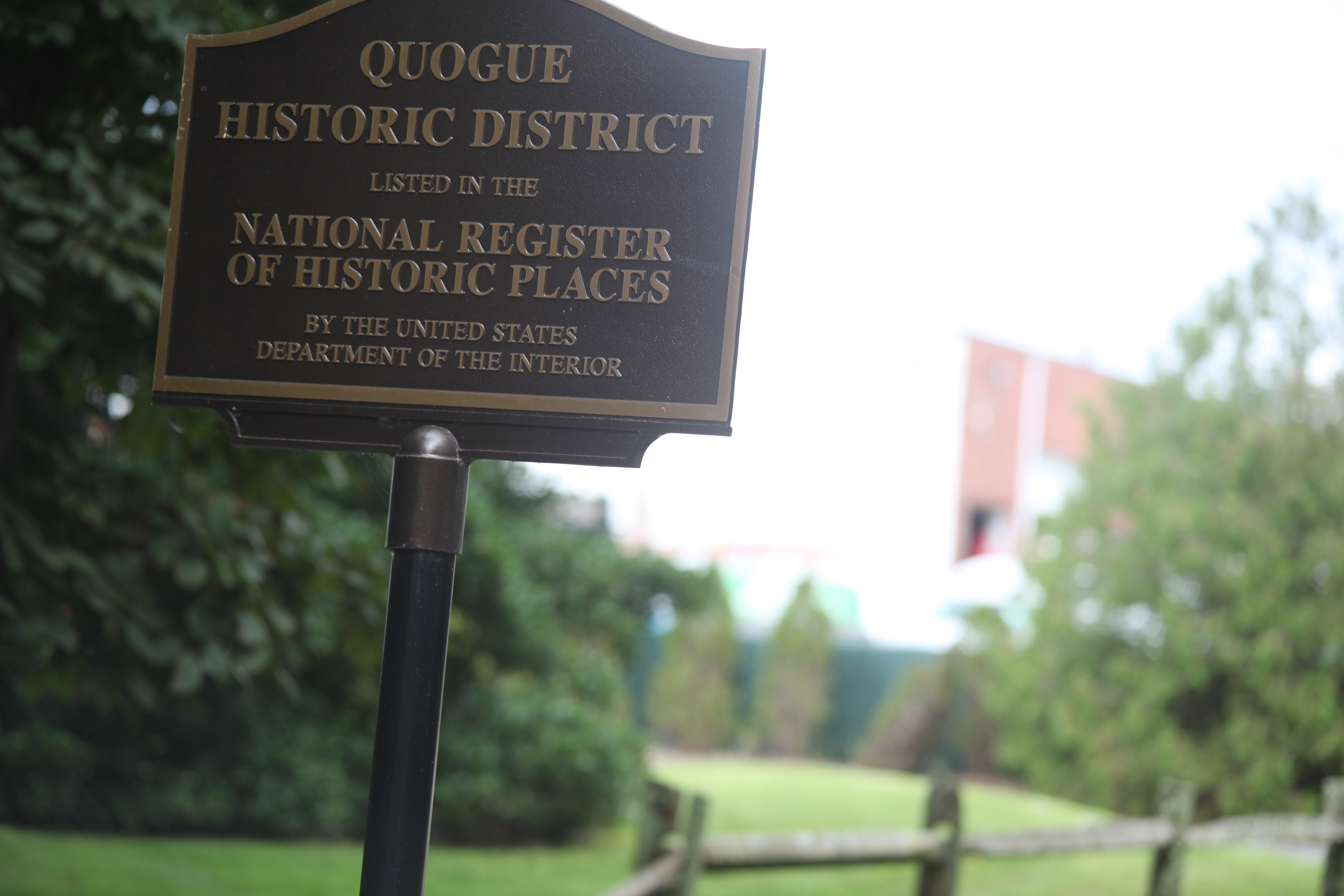
QHD sign

== Historic Status ==
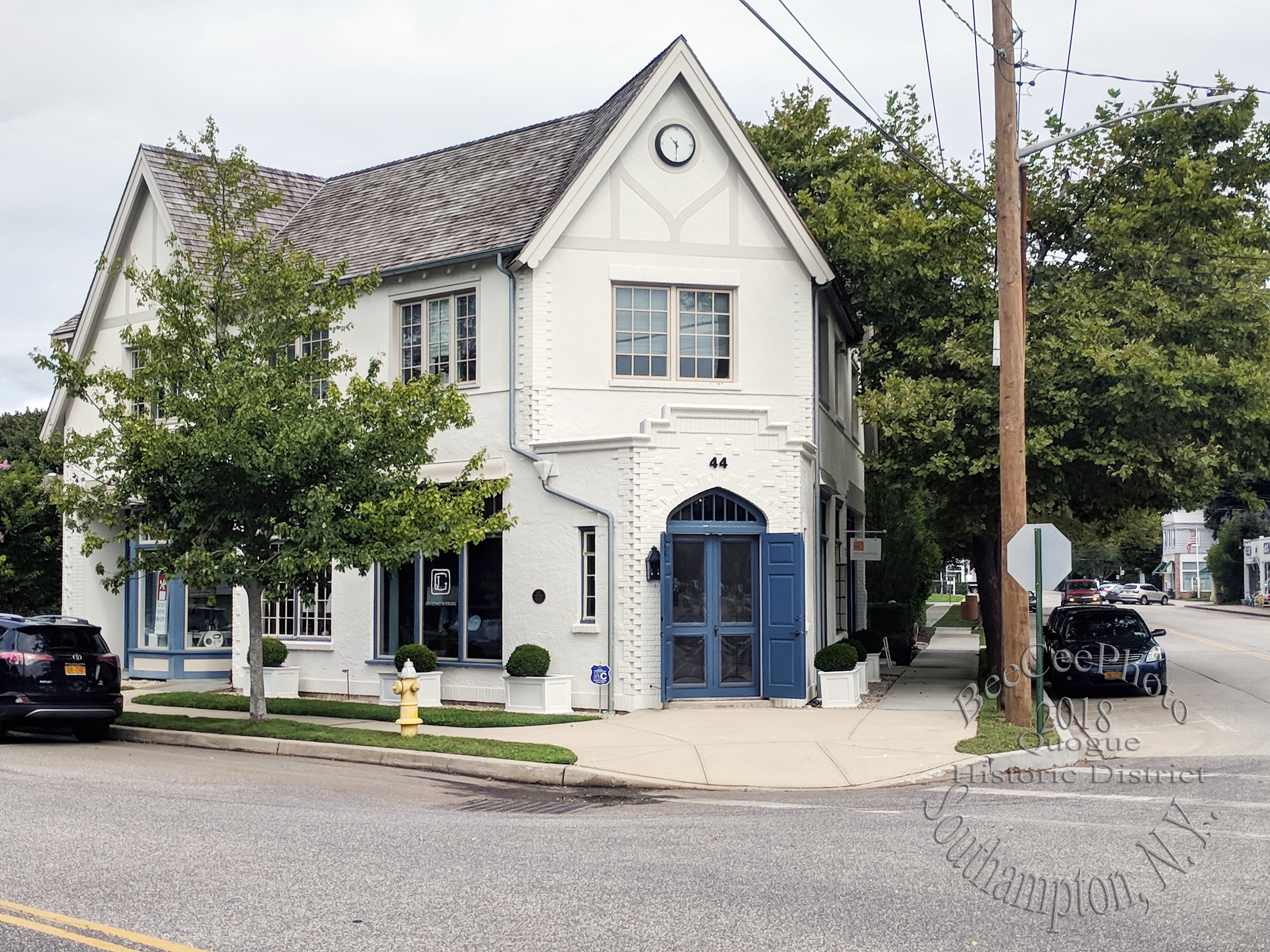
44 Quogue St.

Nancy D. Mullan of Quogue was on the Town of Southampton Landmarks and Historic Districts Board and also a member of the Quogue Historic Preservation Society. She was instrumental in the effort to establish the Quogue Historic District – which was added to the N.Y. State Register in December 2015 and National Register on February 2, 2016. On Jessup Ave, Quogue Community Hall is part of the Quogue Historic District along with the Hampton Theatre company. St. Paul AME Zion is a Southampton town landmarked church on Montauk Highway and the fight to gain NRHP status for the hamlet had been underway as far back as 1992. Numerous attempts were rebuffed, reasons counter varied in considering historic district status, the primary question was whether those sectors being considered had any real historical significance. The Village of Quogue had set itself apart from the Hamptons summer vibe by having a quaint country village lifestyle lacking the moneyed elements common to towns further east in the Hamptons. Boarders occupied rooming houses 4 months out of the year beginning in the 1840s. Stately cottages lined Dune road. The connection to Sag Harbor whaling captains and the landmarked Life-Saving Station along with the Victorian era homes still standing eventually won out. Some 200+ Victorian era houses are contributing to the districts status.

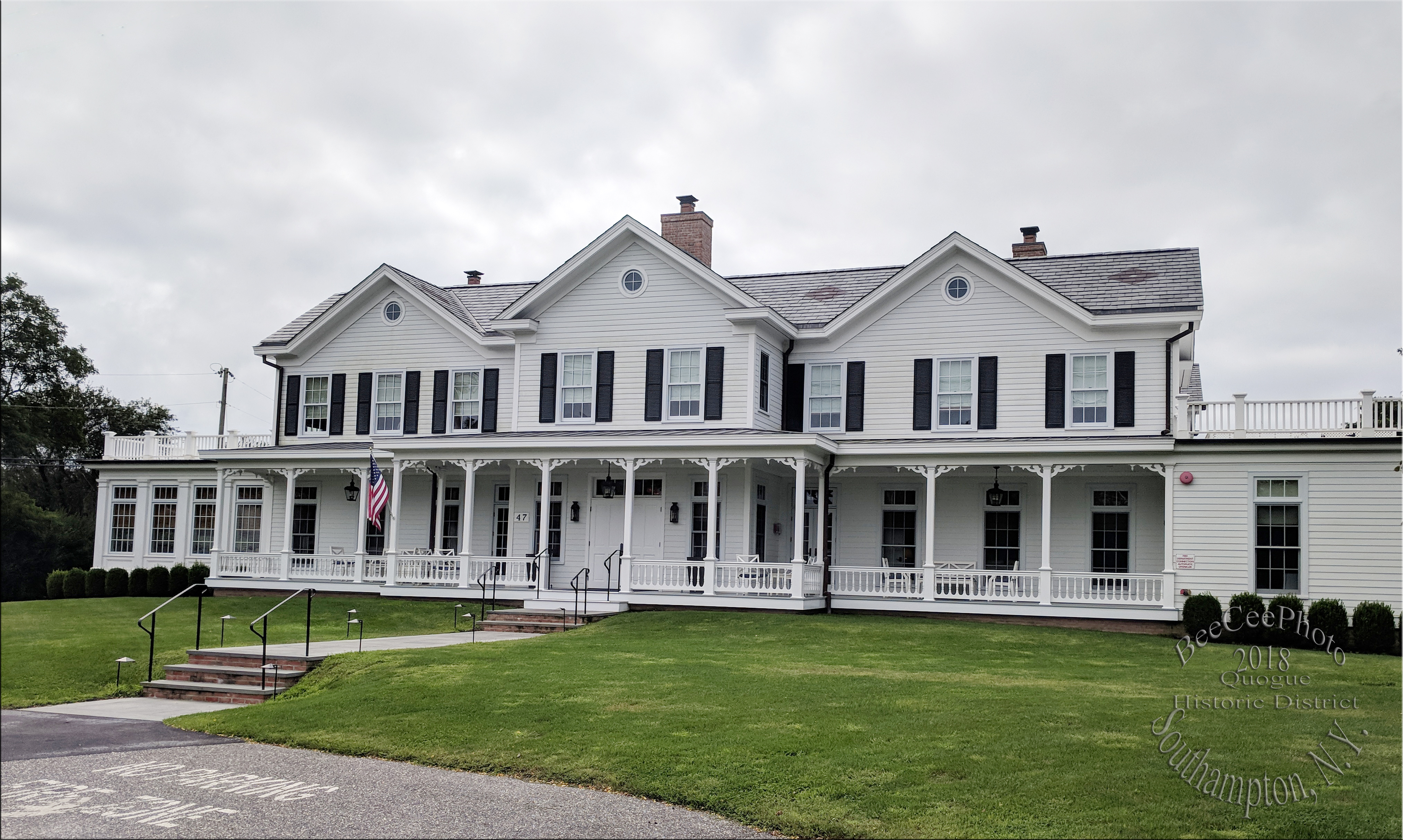
47 Quogue St was built near the location of a historic hotel it replaced

The Park Service, in the nominating petition, stated “The Quogue Historic District is locally significant under Criterion A in the areas of settlement and social history and recreation. The district is additionally significant under Criterion C for its remarkable collection of architecture that reflects Quogue's history as an early agricultural community that transformed into a predominantly seasonal community during the nineteenth century”. Many Victorian homes are still standing in the Quogue Historic District and more than 300 acres have been preserved in a wildlife refuge. Historic Victorian summer cottages alongside modern mansions line Dune Road and the many homes on village streets have the wrap around porches common to the time. The previously landmarked Life-Saving station and the Quogue Cemetery – (National Register Information System ID:13000914) are already separately listed on the NRHP.

The integrity of the Tom Bendelow designed golf course for the Quogue Field Club is also considered to be an important feature of the recreational history of the district.

Five houses, First House, Old Revolution, Antiquity, the Miss Mary Post House and the Foster Homestead are the oldest residences in the village, all date to the pre-Colonial era and all have interiors that have been modernized.

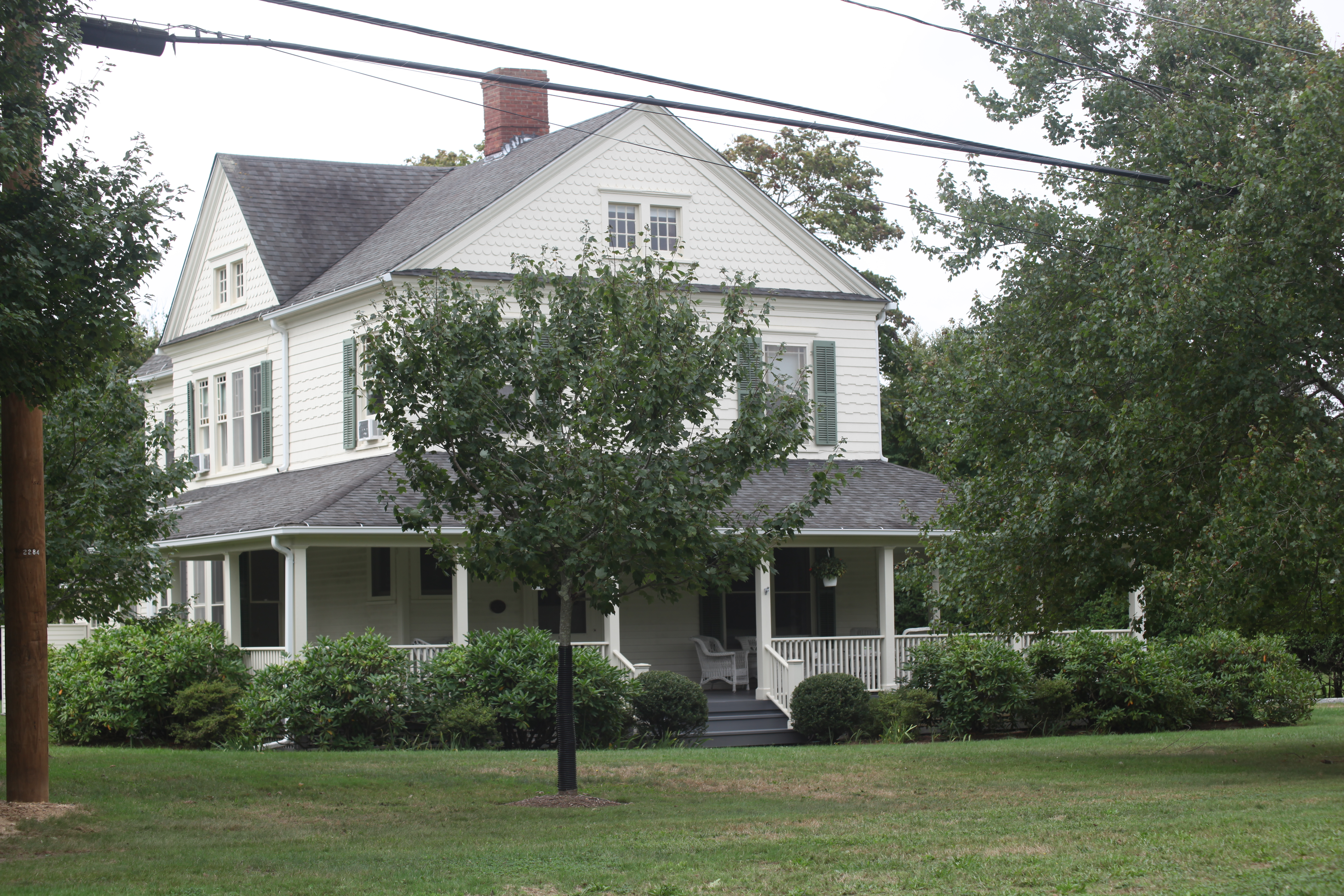

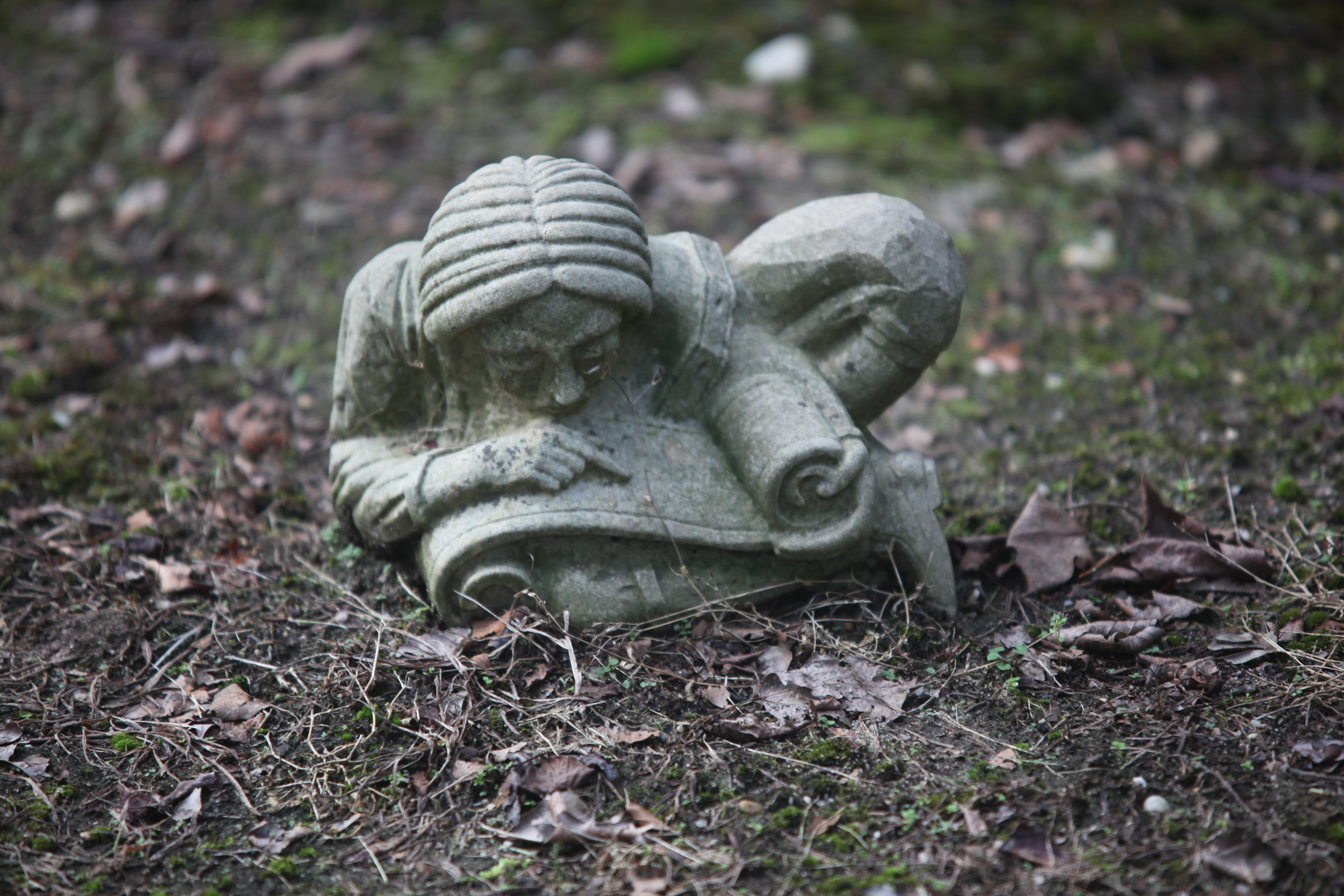

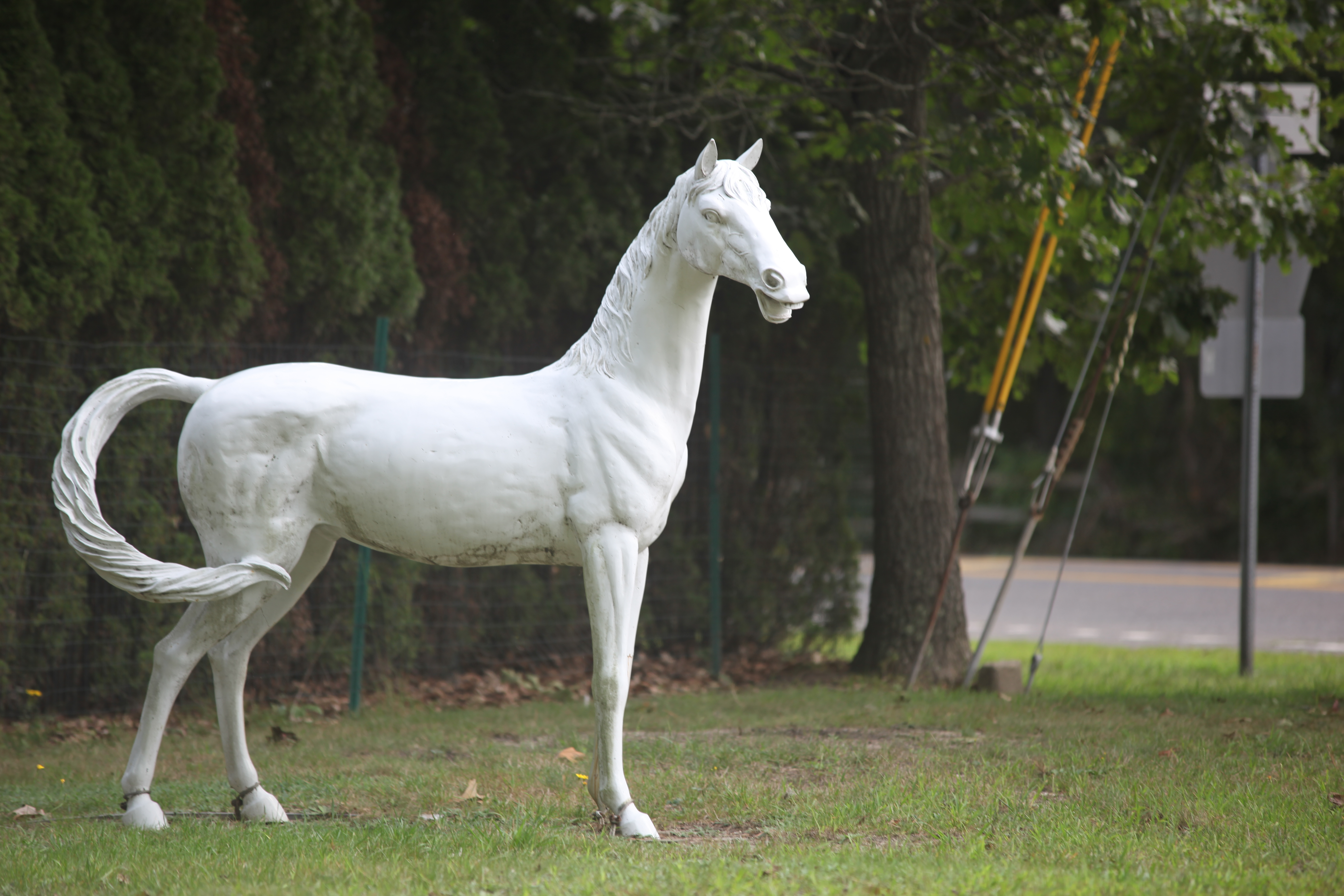

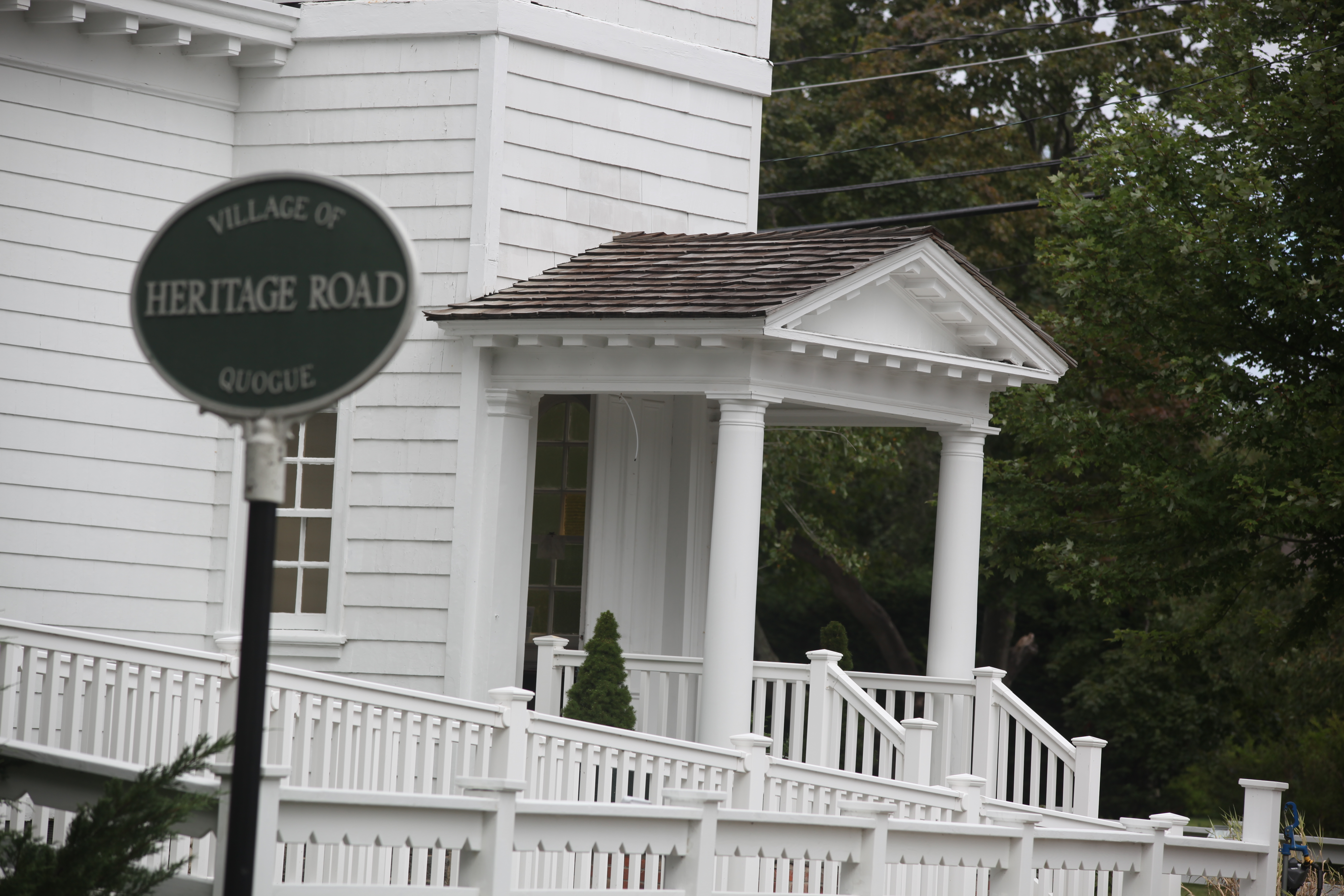
Church on the SW corner of Quogue Street and Beach Lane

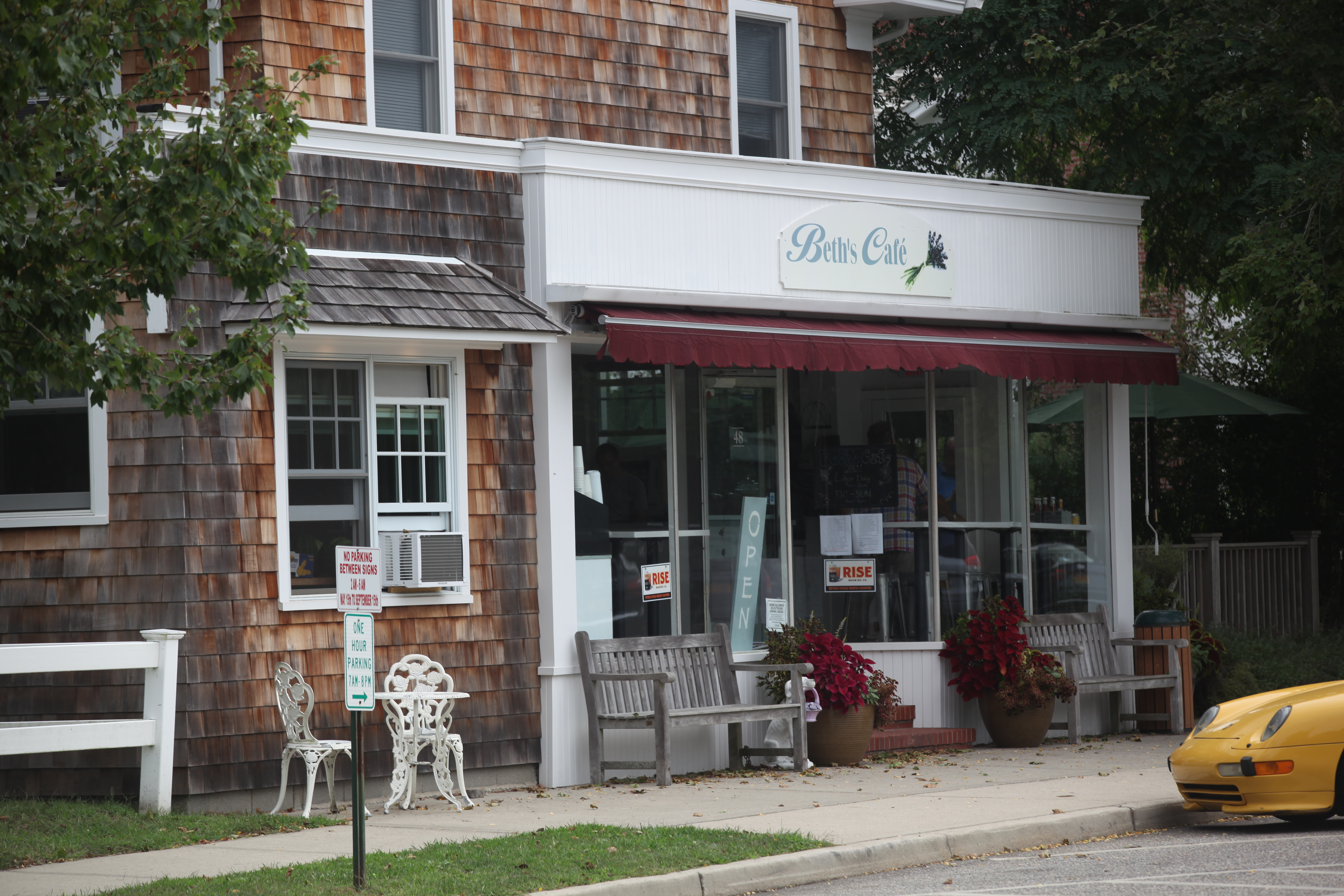
Beth's Café

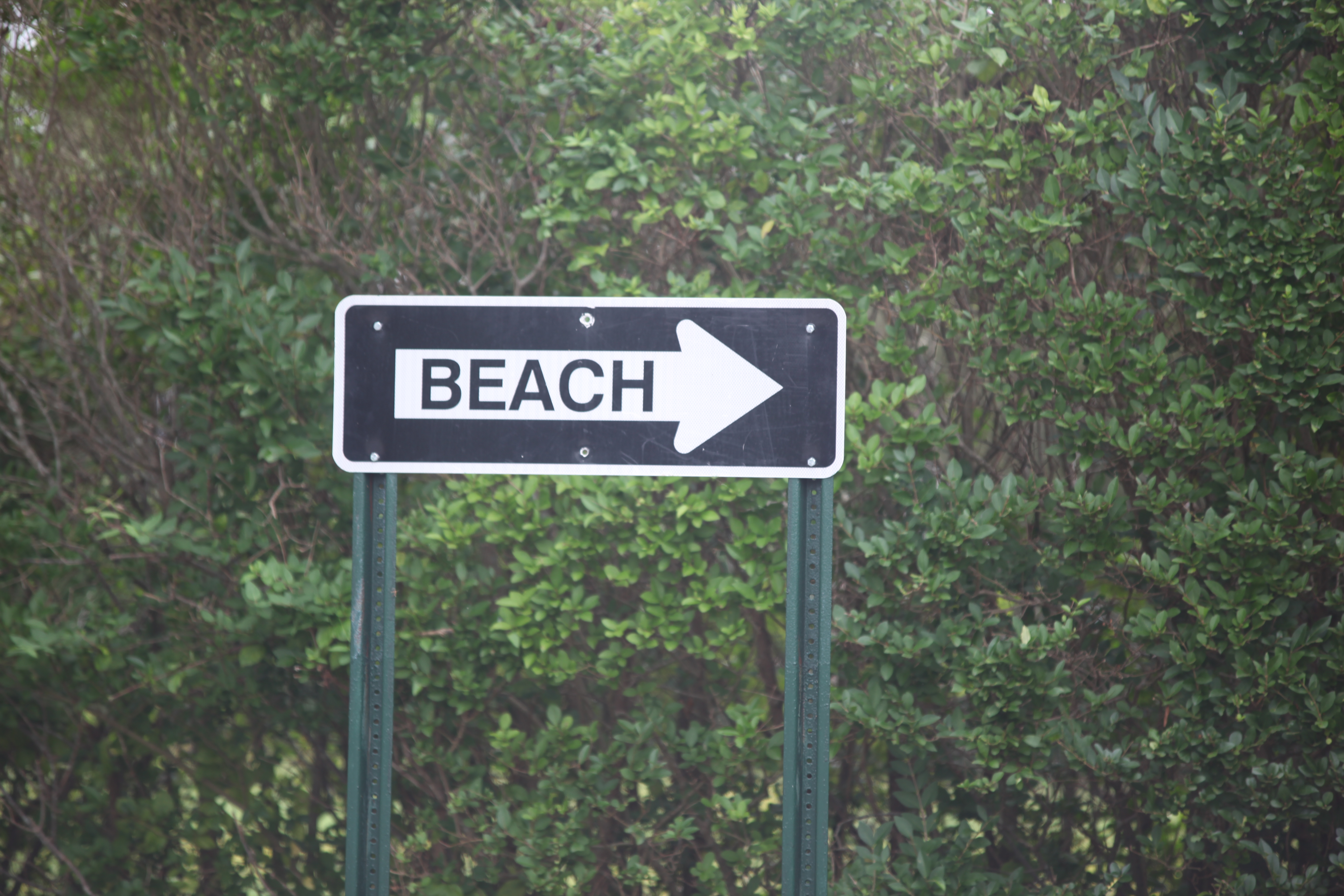
Sign at the SE corner of Quaquanantuck and Post Lanes
