= Tom Bendelow =

American golf course architect (1868–1936)

- Born: September 2, 1868; Aberdeen, Scotland
- Died: March 24, 1936 (aged 67); River Forest, Illinois, U.S.
- Occupation: Architect
- Projects: Medinah Country Club (Medinah, Illinois); Muskegon Country Club (Muskegon, Michigan)

Tom Bendelow (1868–1936), nicknamed "The Johnny Appleseed of American Golf" and "The Dean of American Golf", was a Scottish American golf course architect during the first half of the twentieth century. He is credited with having designed some 600 courses in a 35-year span. Six of his designs have received historic designation by the National Park Service for their significance.

== Early years ==
Born 2 September 1868, in Aberdeen, Scotland, Bendelow was one of nine children. His parents owned a pie shop in the city, and were known for their religious piety. His father taught him the game of golf as a child; however he was trained as a typesetter. There were no careers in golf course design in that era. He courted Mary Ann Nicol, daughter of a prominent farmer. They were married in 1892 at Belhelvie and had a daughter in December 1892. Bendelow immigrated to the United States in the same year. He was 24 years old. His family followed him to America in 1893 His first job was at the New York Herald.

== Association with Spalding and early designs (1895 -1900) ==
According to his grandson Stuart, Bendelow began working for A.G. Spalding, the sporting goods manufacturer in New York City around 1894-1895. This is when Bendelow's career began to take off in earnest. Prior to this, he had been teaching golf in his spare time—most notably to the Pratt family of Standard Oil fame, who also commissioned him to build them a private six-hole course at their Long Island estate but Spalding hired him to exclusively promote the game in the New York and New Jersey areas. "They were not seeking to design and build championship courses or courses to test the honed skills of the best players, but rather courses that new players could enjoy, courses that would improve player proficiency, courses that would promote participation, and courses that could be maintained at a reasonable expense," according to the American Society of Golf Course Architects.

The New York City Park District hired Bendelow in 1899 to redesign and manage the Van Cortlandt Golf Course, the country's first 18-hole municipal golf course. This opportunity gave Bendelow the chance to introduce various innovations to American golfers. These included the use of reserve play (tee) times, course marshals, public player associations, public golf instruction, and training for caddies. While he believed golf should be a sport that the public could play at little to no cost, he nevertheless secured many commissions from private clubs and wealthy individuals.

In spring of 1899 Bendelow laid out the course for The Apawamis Club. The course opened to great acclaim on 13 May 1899 in an 18-hole match against Westchester Country Club; the captain of the Apawamis Golf Club team was Herbert A. Sherman. In 1900, Bendelow's friend Harry Vardon would proclaim the Apawamis course to be one of the 3 best in the country including Newport and Atlantic City. This appears to have been a watershed moment as the volume of his commissions increased with an estimate of 150 plans drawn as of 1899.

1900 saw Bendelow accompany Vardon on a landmark exhibition tour throughout America.

Bendelow was editor on many Spalding Athletic Library's official golf guides. The guides included information on championships, illustrations, and "how to".

== Golf course promoter and increasing prominence as golf course architect (1901- 1925) ==
In 1901, Bendelow moved to Chicago to be Spalding's Director of Golf Course Development. This era was notable for the expansion of golf facilities in North America, with millions of new players, and Bendelow was well placed to encourage and assist this. For the next 16 years, he criss-crossed the US and Canada, laying out courses, providing construction advice, encouraging players' associations, and promoting the growth of the game.

Another "of Tom Bendelow's early designs was executed in 1904 during this spurt of growth at the Atlanta Athletic Club's 18-hole course at East Lake Golf Club; this was the place where the great Bobby Jones learned the game," wrote Colin Farquharson in a 2006 profile of Bendelow. "'It was extraordinary in that it gave a golfer the opportunity to use every wood and iron in his bag, 'said Jones.'"

After almost 21 years at Spalding, Bendelow severed his ties with the company in 1916 and announced he was going into business for himself. At that time, it was estimated he had already designed over 640 courses in the United States and Canada> Not long after though, he accepted the position of Golf Department Manager with a competitor, the Thos. E. Wilson sporting goods company.

In 1920, Bendelow joined Myron West's "American Park Builders Company" in Chicago, as Chief Golf Course Designer, and focused on designing comprehensive city plans, subdivisions, country clubs, golf courses, and golf course communities.

== Medinah Country Club ==
Between 1925 and 1928, Bendelow designed three courses for the founders of the Medinah Country Club with his work on Course No. 3 becoming famous world-wide. A redesign of No. 3 in the 1930s by Bendelow presaged greater things to come. Medinah No. 3 has served as the host site to several major championships, including the US Open in 1949, 1975, and 1990, as well as the PGA Championship in 1999 and 2006. The 2012 Ryder Cup was played on the course, which is widely considered not merely one of the best courses in Illinois, but one of the finest golf courses in the United States. However, the No. 3 course has been extensively redesigned since Bendelow's time, a common occurrence for courses from that era which are still used for modern championship play.

== Design philosophy ==
Bendelow's approach to course design was that of a "naturalist's approach," in that he strove to use the natural features of the chosen site to maximum advantage. His courses have often been called "Olmstedian", in that his method of naturalist design was greatly influenced by the work of prominent landscape architects Frederick Law Olmsted Sr. and Jr. "If a site had an especially unique feature –- rock outcrop, stream, grove of trees, scenic view -– he would work his hole placements in such a way as to take full advantage of the features even if that meant working his layout from the middle out," according to the American Society of Golf Course Architects. "Bendelow's designs changed as the game of golf changed. When given good sites and adequate resources with which to work, he could produce a very challenging lay out, equal to the best work of the day. His personal goal however, was to build good, solid, enjoyable golf courses." Bendelow would often describe his courses as "sporty", meaning that his courses "should present enjoyable play for both beginner and advanced players; not too hard to discourage the new player and not without challenge to the more accomplished golfer."

Most of Bendelow's early work was focused on spreading the game and "bringing golf to the majority of the populace." As a result, most of his designs prior to World War I were fairly basic, focusing more on playability and ease of construction and maintenance. After World War I, Bendelow's designs started to become more strategically intricate, particularly in his work for private clubs. Bendelow left A.G. Spalding and joined American Park Builders during this time. In addition, construction technology and client budgets greatly advanced after World War I. These factors would give him the time required to focus on developing more challenging layouts. The added resources also allowed Bendelow to use more refined techniques in design and construction, including the use of topographic maps, soil surveys, irrigation plans, and plaster of paris green models.

== Personal life ==
He died at his home in River Forest, Illinois, on 24 March 1936 at the age of 67.

== Legacy ==
Bendelow is recognized as possibly the most prolific of course designers worldwide, a pioneer in the establishment and growth of the game in America. Bendelow personally designed some 700 courses, taught course design at the college level, played the game with golfers including Harry Vardon, and wrote abundantly. He even had his own line of Thos. E. Wilson golf clubs. He exerted a profound impact on the introduction and spread of the game of golf in North America.

Prior to 1981, Bendelow's contribution had been all but forgotten by the golfing community. Much of his work was sarcastically described as "18 Stakes on a Sunday Afternoon". While this approach to design was not uncommon in Bendelow's field (architects would initially simply drive stakes into the ground to designate tee, fairway, and green locations, usually completing the work in a single day), the term would end up attached to Bendelow as a snide reference.

Publication of the book The Golf Course, by Geoffrey Cornish and Ronald Whitten, helped to change this diminishing perception. The book substantiated the breadth of Bendelow's portfolio of work and placed him alongside other golf architects of renown. Bendelow's induction into the Illinois Golf Hall of Fame in 2005 further solidified his claim to a legacy; his elevation was reportedly the result of years of efforts by his grandson to restore Bendelow's name to the annals of American golfing history.

Because of his work in bringing the game of golf to the general public, it is believed that "more people have learned to play golf on a Tom Bendelow designed course than that of any other golf course architect."

== Historic designations ==
A testament to Bendelow's historic imprint on the sport of golf is the increasing number of his designs that have been publicly recognized by the US Department of the Interior and added to the list of National Register of Historic Places. The National Park Service has highlighted the significance of at least six of Bendelow's courses which represents 10 percent of the historic courses represented. In fact, his design for City Park Golf Course, Baton Rouge, LA, was the first golf course awarded such an honor in the history of the National Park Service. Wing Park Golf Club, Elgin, Illinois (1908), City Park Golf Course, Denver, Colorado (1913) and Temple Terrace Golf Course in Hillsborough, Florida are also listed on the National Register of Places.

Bendelow's design for Quogue helped the Quogue Historic District attain NRP recognition in 2016.

Bendelow also designed park systems—and even cemeteries—throughout the United States and Canada.

== Courses designed ==
At the start of his career, Bendelow designed and oversaw installation of courses with as few as 6 holes to 9, a full 18, also expanding 9 hole courses to 18. Among his private clients were the H. M. Pratt family in Glen Cove, NY in 1894 and a Miss Phelps in Blue Ridge, PA.

The following is a partial list of courses designed by Tom Bendelow:

- OD denotes courses for which Bendelow is the original designer
- R denotes courses reconstructed by Bendelow
- A denotes courses for which Bendelow made substantial additions
- E denotes courses that Bendelow examined and on the construction of which he consulted

Name	Contribution	Year built	City / Town	State / Province	Country	Comments
La Cumbre CC	A	1918	Santa Barbara	California	United States	
Point Loma	OD	1913	San Diego	California	United States	currently named The Loma Club
Manchester CC	OD	1917	Manchester	Connecticut	United States	with Devereux Emmet
Dubsdread	OD	1924	Orlando	Florida	United States	
Palma Ceia G&CC	OD	1915	Tampa	Florida	United States	
Temple Terrace G&CC	OD	1921	Temple Terrace	Florida	United States	
Glen Oak CC	OD	1911	Glen Ellyn	Illinois	United States	
Medinah CC	OD	1925	Medinah	Illinois	United States	
The CC of Indianapolis	OD	1911	Indianapolis	Indiana	United States	
Mission Hills CC	OD	1915	Mission Hills	Kansas	United States	
Audubon CC	OD	1908	Louisville	Kentucky	United States	
Lexington CC	OD	1912	Lexington	Kentucky	United States	
City Park GC	OD	1926	Baton Rouge	Louisiana	United States	
Birmingham CC	OD	1916	Birmingham	Michigan	United States	site of the 1953 PGA Championship
Grand Hotel Grand Nine GC	OD	1901	Mackinac Island	Michigan	United States	
Kalamzoo CC	OD	1909	Kalamazoo	Michigan	United States	
Gull Lake CC	OD	1910	Richland	Michigan	United States	
Higman Park Golf Links	OD	1903	Benton Harbor	Michigan	United States	
Huron Hills GC	OD	1921	Ann Arbor	Michigan	United States	
Mullett Lake CC	OD	1914	Mullett Lake	Michigan	United States	
Muskegon CC	OD	1909	Muskegon	Michigan	United States	
Saginaw CC	OD	1898	Saginaw	Michigan	United States	
Algonquin GC	OD	1904	Glendale	Missouri	United States	one of the St. Louis, Missouri area's oldest private country clubs
Beacon-by-the-Sea Golf Link	OD	1895	Point Pleasant	New Jersey	United States	
East Orange GC	OD	1923	East Orange	New Jersey	United States	
GC of Lakewood	OD	1898	Lakewood	New Jersey	United States	
Llewellyn Park GC	OD	1895	West Orange	New Jersey	United States	private course for Richard E. Colgate
Morris County CC	OD	1897	Morristown	New Jersey	United States	
Morris County GC	OD	1894	Morris Township	New Jersey	United States	
Somerset Inn GC	OD	1897	Bernardsville	New Jersey	United States	
Century CC	OD	1898	The Bronx	New York	United States	Non-extant course
Charles M. Pratt Private Course	OD	1896	Glen Cove	New York	United States	
Eagle's Nest	OD	1900	Raquette Lake	New York	United States	with Willie Dunn
Fox Hills GC	OD	1899	Staten Island	New York	United States	
Quogue Field Club	OD	1900	Quogue	New York	United States	
The Apawamis Club	OD	1899	Rye	New York	United States	
Van Cortlandt GC	OD	1899	The Bronx	New York	United States	
Lake Junaluska GC	OD	1919	Waynesville	North Carolina	United States	
Findlay CC	OD	1908	Findlay	Ohio	United States	
Losantiville CC	OD	1902	Cincinnati	Ohio	United States	
Shawnee CC	OD	1904	Lima	Ohio	United States	
Wyoming GC	OD	1897	Cincinnati	Ohio	United States	
Ellwood City CC	OD	1917	Ellwood City	Pennsylvania	United States	presently Connoquenessing CC
Dallas CC	OD	1908	Highland Park	Texas	United States	
Fort Worth GC (River Crest)	OD	1911	Fort Worth	Texas	United States	
Tripoli CC	OD	1921	Milwaukee	Wisconsin	United States	
