= Temple Terrace Golf and Country Club =

- Temple Terrace Golf Course
- U.S. National Register of Historic Places
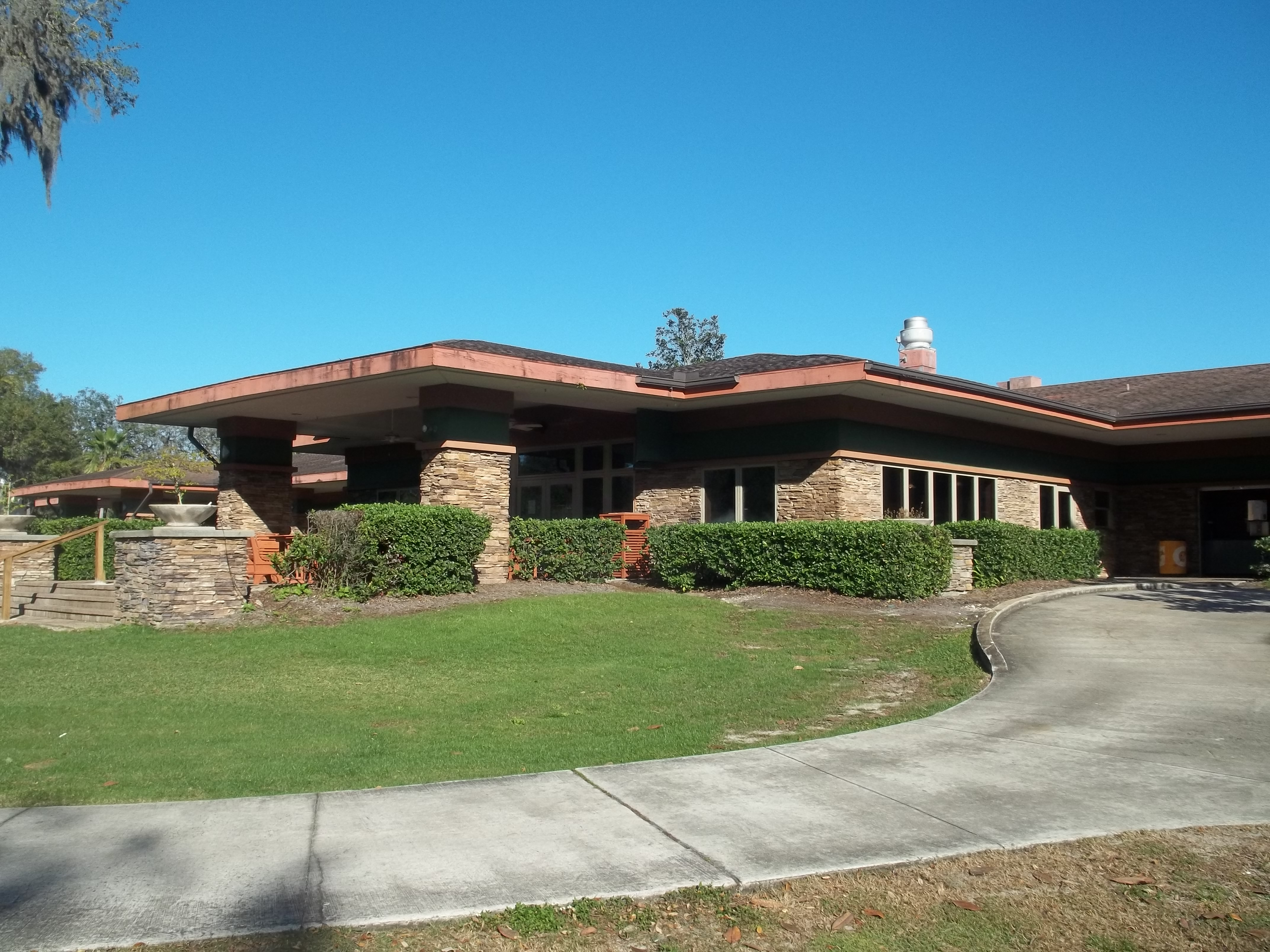
- The clubhouse at Temple Terrace Golf Course

- Location within Florida Location within the United States
- Location: Temple Terrace, Florida
- Coordinates: 28.037081°N 82.385294°W
- Architect: Tom Bendelow
- NRHP reference No.: 12000888
- Added to NRHP: October 30, 2012

The Temple Terrace Golf and Country Club is an historic golf course and country club in Temple Terrace, Florida. The course was designed by Tom Bendelow and opened in 1922. The city of Temple Terrace was incorporated three years later. The golf course was added to the National Register of Historic Places on October 30, 2012, as the Temple Terrace Golf Course. The Country Club was designed by M. Leo Elliott and also built in 1922. The clubhouse became part of what is now Florida College in the 1930s.

In 1925 the Florida Open was first played at Temple Terrace, and in 2011 the first US Pro Hickory Championship.
