= Quogue Life-Saving Station =

- U.S. National Register of Historic Places
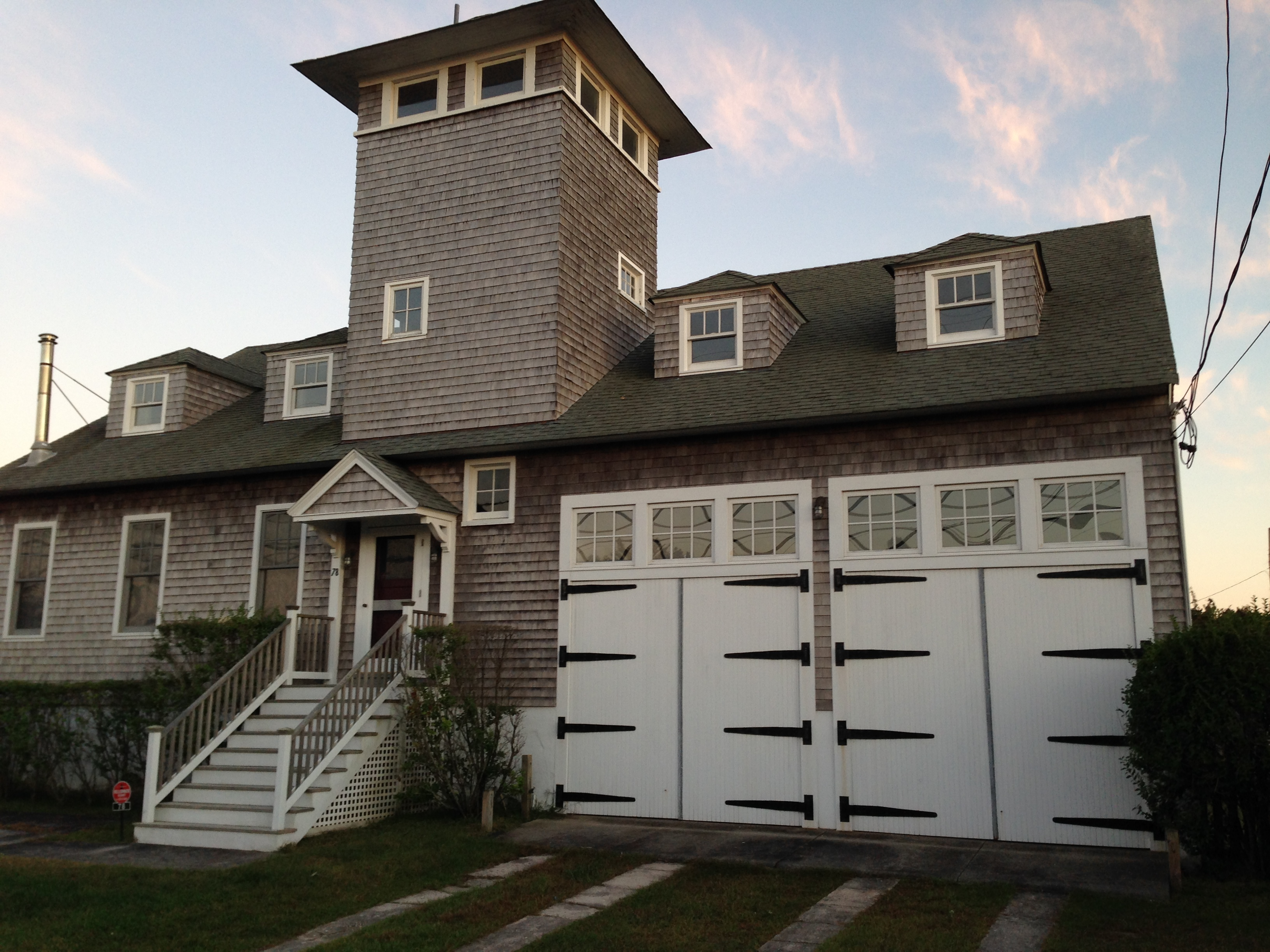

- Location within New York Location within the United States
- Location: 78 Dune Road, Quogue, New York
- Coordinates: 40°48′26″N 72°36′0″W
- Area: less than one acre
- Built: 1912
- Architect: Mendleff, Victor
- Architectural style: Shingle Style
- NRHP reference No.: 99000640
- Added to NRHP: March 12, 1999

Quogue Life-Saving Station is a historic government building in Quogue, New York. It is a shingle style building constructed in 1912 by the United States Life-Saving Service as a replacement for a deteriorating station from 1849.

It is a 1 1/2-story, gable-roofed structure that features a four-story, wood-shingled tower topped by a hipped roof. In 1999, the station was added to the National Register of Historic Places.

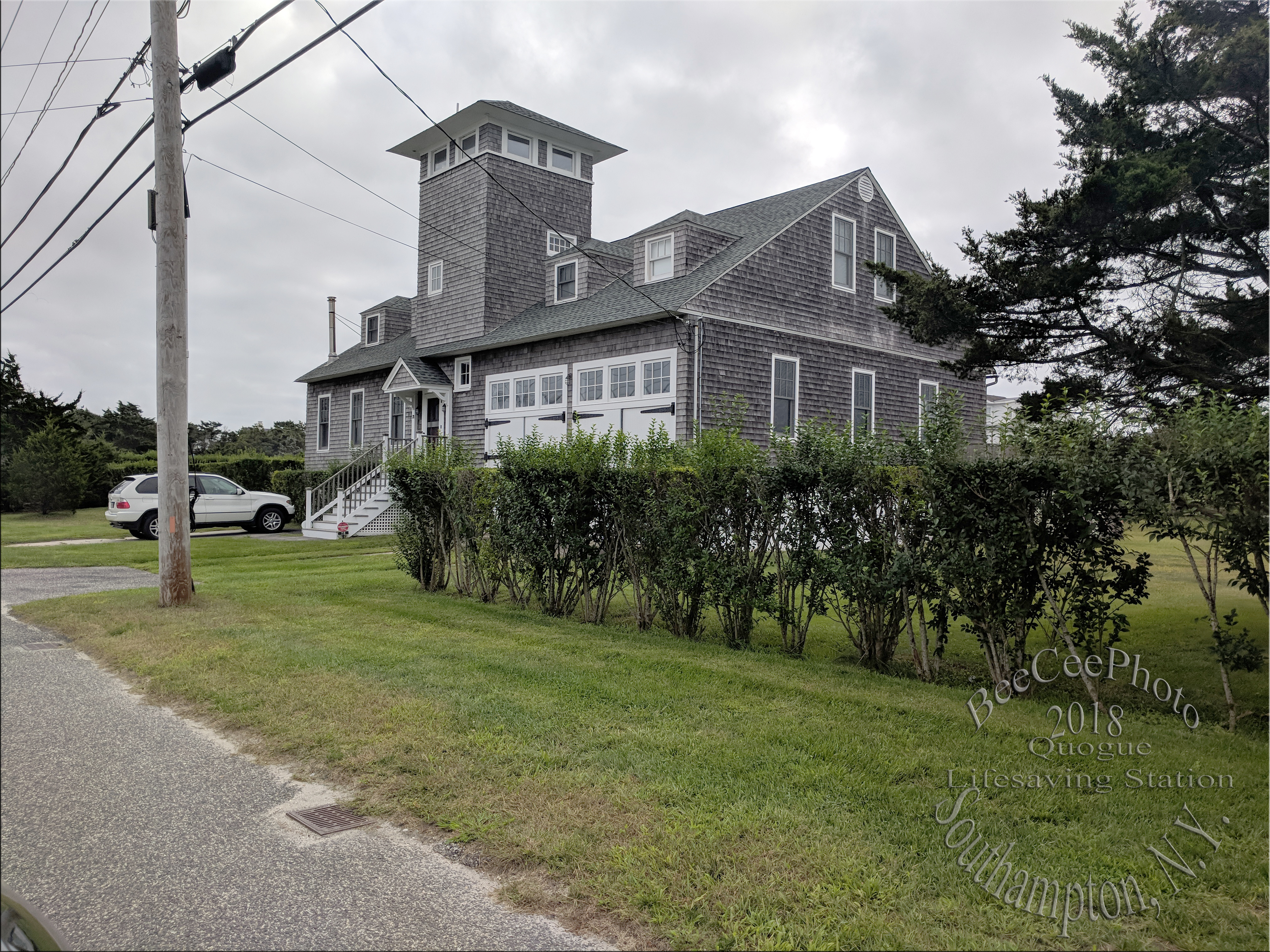
1912 4-story tower, designed by architect Victor Mendelheff

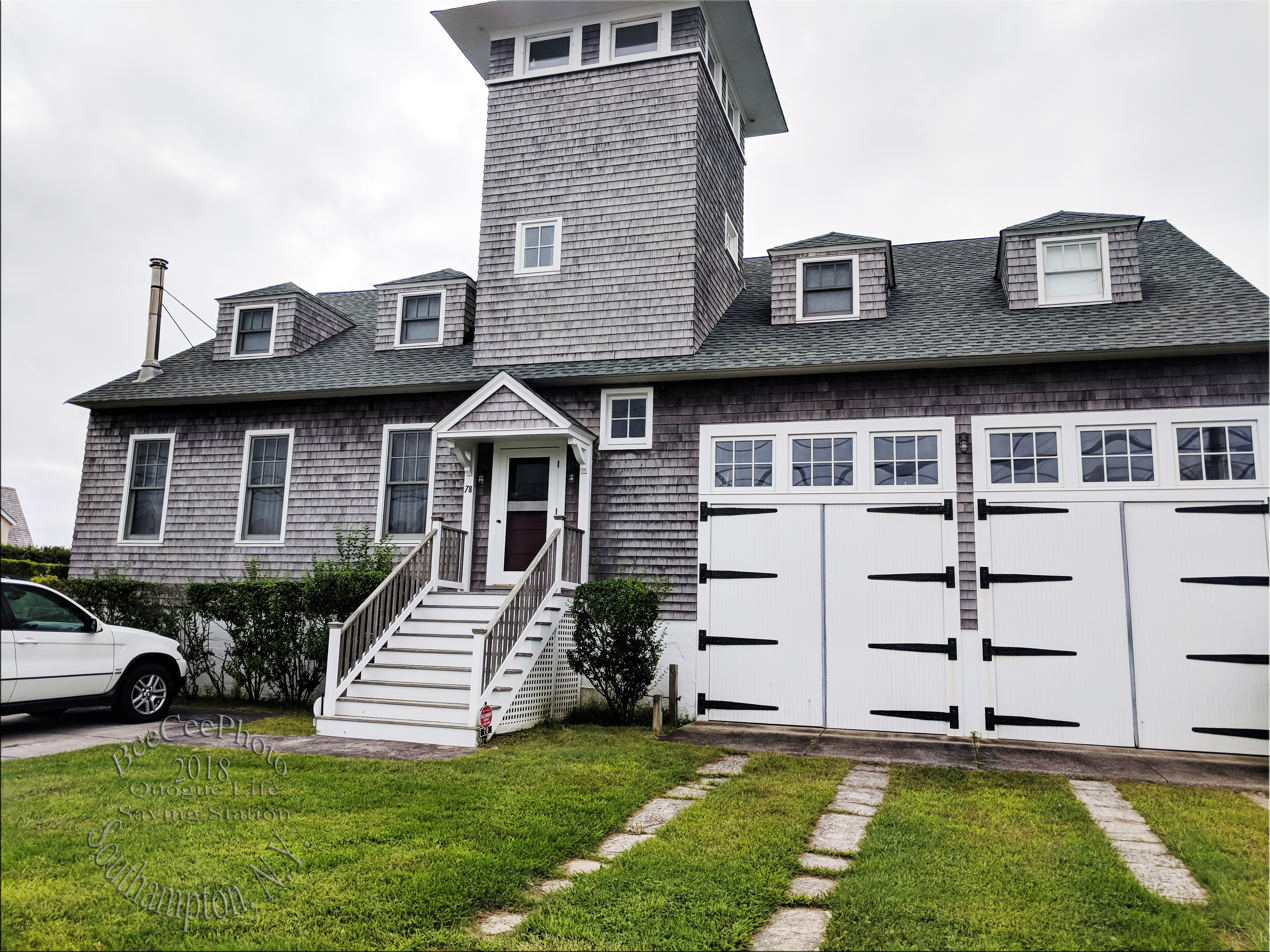
Front on Dune Rd.

The original station was a garage-type building constructed in 1849. It rescued the ships Infanti in 1851 and Europa in 1886. It was replaced in 1872 with a red house, with additional wings added in 1887. This station edition assisted with rescuing the ships Nahum Chapin in 1897 and Augustus Hunt in 1904. The original red house was moved a few hundred yards eastward and is now used as a private home.

The new, Lorain-style, shingled station was designed by the architect Victor Mendelheff and incorporated into the United States Coast Guard in 1915. It is one of the few remaining examples of this type of structure. It currently functions as a private residence.

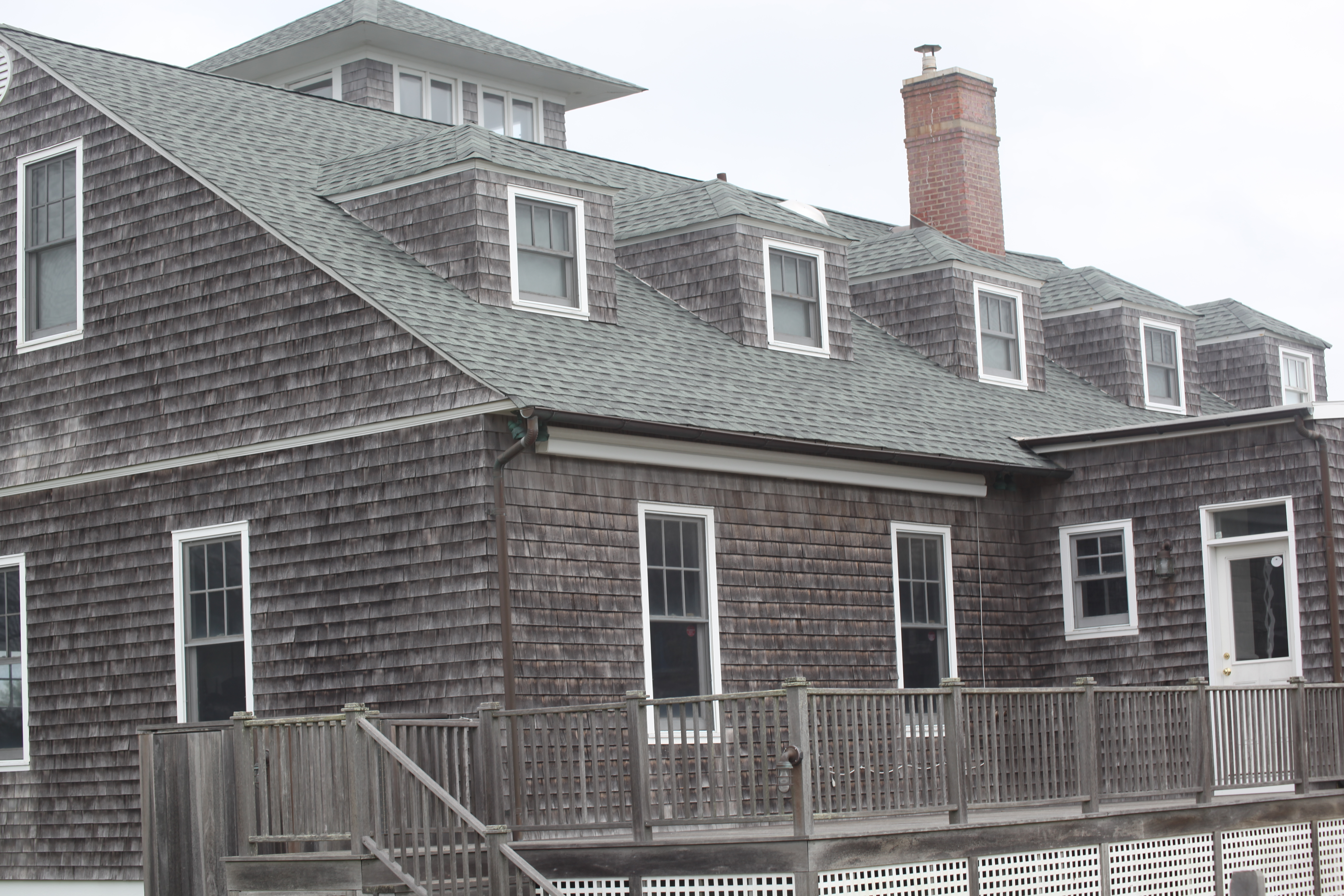
Well kept property on Dune rd was once the Lifesaving station the US Coast Guard used in Quogue.

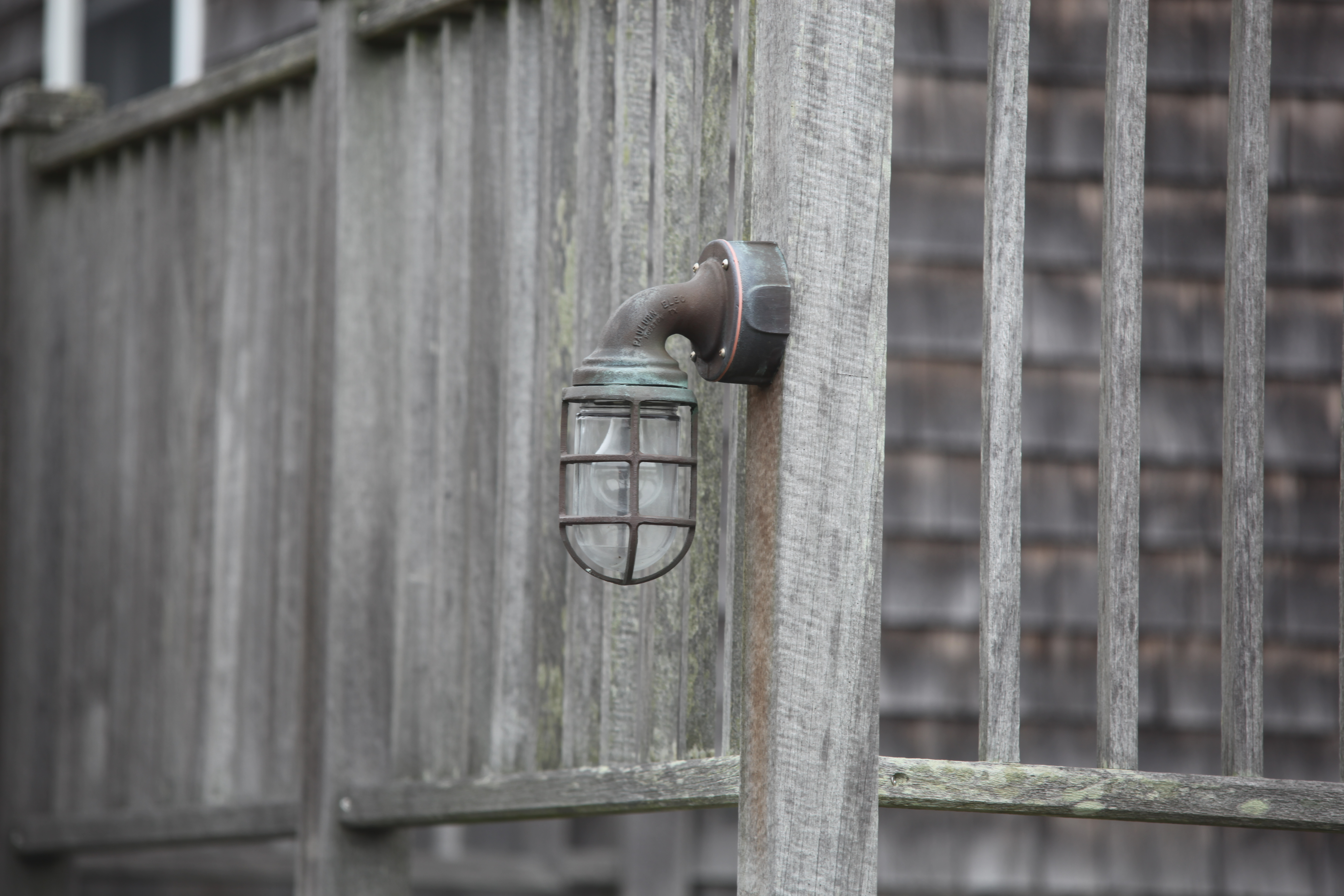
Lamp detail- Lifesaving station in Quogue.
