= Dallas Country Club =

Country club in Highland Park, Texas

Coordinates: 32°50′06″N 96°48′03″W

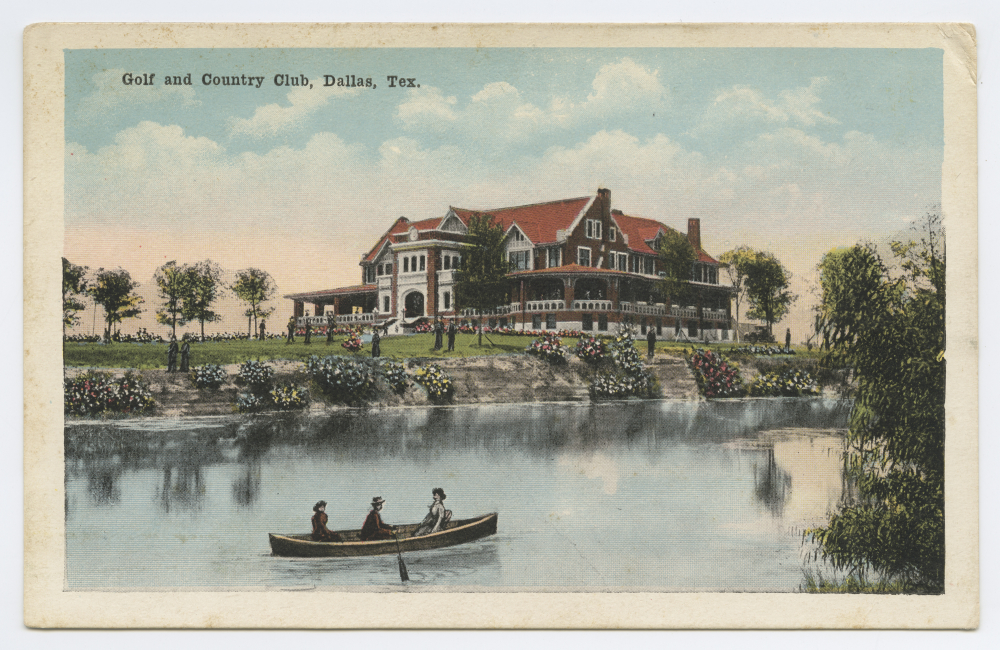
- Dallas Country Club, circa 1920
- Interactive map of Dallas Country Club

Club information
- Established: 1896, moved 1912
- Type: Private
- Total holes: 18
- Designed by: Tom Bendelow
- Par: 70
- Length: 6,266

Dallas Country Club is a country club located in the town of Highland Park in Dallas County, Texas. Located on the northern end of Exall Lake across from Highland Park Village, its borders are Preston Road on the west, Beverly Drive on the south, Golf Drive on the east, and McFarlin Boulevard on the north.

== History ==
It was established in 1896, purportedly by "several men golfing on a cow patch in Oak Lawn." Tom Bendelow designed the golf course with the first round of golf being played in 1912. Golfers from the club, along with those from several other area clubs, formed the Dallas District Golf Association in 1948 to promote the game and tournament play in the area. The course was renovated by designer Jay Morrish. It is a par 70, 6,266-yard course. Dallas Country Club was ranked number 52 on the list of the state's best golf clubs, public and private, released in 2008.

== Society Spot ==
The club, according to The Dallas Morning News, has been a staple of Highland Park's most exclusive social circuit for more than a century. A 1911 photograph shows the Dallas Shakespeare Society, the area's oldest literary organization, on the steps of the clubhouse, where it had held its annual meeting. Its membership roster has grown to more than 1,500, and it includes many of the city's most prominent business and civic leaders."

== Controversy ==
The club's membership admissions, particularly its racial exclusivity, has been a topic of debate in the community and became a point of contention in local and national politics alike. Mayor Tom Leppert resigned during his campaign in 2006 over the club's lack of nonwhite members. The club did not admit its first African American member until 2014, after a 13-year application process.

Controversies arose when Lynne Cheney was a guest at the club in 2007, as well as the refusal to grant membership to baseball all-star Alex Rodriguez, who, at the time had the most lucrative contract in sports history.

In an interview with The Dallas Morning News in 1986, Vincent Perini, president of the Dallas Bar Association characterized the district attorney's office staff as "a bunch of SMU frat rats who are, you know, putting in a little postgraduate work down there kicking [expletives deleted] before going on to the real world, the respectable world, the Dallas Country Club and the civil law firm."

Norman Kinne, a prosecutor in the office responded, "I can't believe the elected president of the Dallas Bar Association, in one fell swoop, manages to insult Southern Methodist University, fraternities, the black race, the Dallas Country Club and all civil law firms."
