= Muskegon Country Club =

Country club in Michigan, USA

Coordinates: 43°12′50″N 86°18′44″W

Muskegon Country Club was founded in 1908 and is a private country club owned by the RedWater Collection

The club features a private 18 hole golf course in Muskegon, Michigan located on 130 acres of dunes between Lake Michigan and Muskegon Lake. The course was originally laid out by early 20th-century golf course designer Tom Bendelow. The course design was updated in the early 1920s by famous golf course designer Donald Ross.

Muskegon Country Club has hosted many golf tournaments over the decades, many of them sanctioned by the Golf Association of Michigan (GAM). Since 1985, five U.S. Open (golf) qualifiers have been played here. Since 2005, two Michigan Amateur Championships were held here. In 2017, the Senior Amateur of Michigan was held here.

== History ==
On October 29, 1908, Muskegon business and professional leaders met to form the Muskegon Country Club. They purchased 167 acres of heavily wooded, second-cut hardwoods. This dune land near Lake Michigan closely bordered Lake Muskegon. Interestingly, they had an option to buy a tract of land extending west all the way to Lake Michigan. They declined.

=== First Designer - Tom Bendelow ===
Tom Bendelow worked for A.G. Spalding and had developed over 500 courses in that era. One of his most notable was Medinah Golf Course #2 in Medinah, IL. Bendelow made several trips to Muskegon from Chicago and when the course was complete, he said, ″The course is a splendid one, considerably over 6000 yards, and abounds in all kinds of hazards found in any seaboard course of the old country. There is not a level piece of ground in the whole tract, and the versatility of the golfer who thinks he can play- and may able on that course - will certainly be tested to a fine degree.″

=== Second Designer - Donald Ross ===
After World War I, leaders at the Muskegon Country Club employed Donald Ross to confirm the choices of Bendelow's original design and upgrade the golf course to an even higher degree of play and credibility. After Donald Ross saw Muskegon Country Club, he claimed, ″The fact is, you have the most wonderful piece of property for a golf course I have ever seen." Ross tweaked Bendelow's design and improved upon it. He affirmed the fan design. "It gives you an opportunity to place your clubhouse at the handle of the fan and then layout two loops of nine holes each of either side from it. The first tee, ninth green, tenth tee, and eighteenth green are then all the handle of the fan." Ross said. The Bendelow and Ross legacy benefited from two masters of golf course design. Ross worked with the Muskegon Country Club or over the next ten years, improving fairway locations, new grasses, and new bunkers.

=== Walter Hagen Exhibition ===
In 1925, Walter Hagen was at the peak of his illustrious career. He had won the U.S, Open (golf) in 1914 and 1919. The USPGA in 1921, 1924, and 1925. It was in 1925 that Hagen staged an exhibition at the Muskegon Country Club. According to local accounts, Hagen was late and arrived with a beautiful woman draped on each arm. This account was not reported in the local newspaper. What was reported was that Hagen shot a 65 and impressed everyone!

== Notable Tournaments since 1985 ==
While Muskegon Country Club may not be designed or situated to host national tournaments, this club has hosted many important golf events.

=== 1985 U.S. Open Qualifier ===
Muskegon Country club updated the course to the modern era. This brought in opportunities to host U.S. Open Qualifiers. In the 1985 event, one of the winners, Tom Foster said, "The course was probably three shots tougher than before"

=== 2000 U.S. Open Qualifier ===
On May 14 of 2000, fifty-nine participates sought to qualify for the 100th U.S. Open. Eric Jorgensen shot a two-under 70 to win the gold medal.

=== 2002 U.S. Open Qualifier ===
John Koskinen shot a 68 to win the medal.

=== 2018 U.S. Open Qualifier ===
Four tied with a score of 69 and advanced: There were Matt Harmon of Grand Rapids, Michigan, Kaleb Johnson (a) of Naples, Florida, Kyle Mueller (a) of Athens, Georgia, and James Piot (a) of Canton, Michigan.

=== 2021 U.S. Open Qualifier ===
Troy Taylor II of Westerville, Ohio, won the gold medal with a 6-under 66 on Monday, May 3, 2021.

=== Qualifiers for the U.S. Amateur Tournaments ===
The Muskegon Country Club has hosted qualifying events for the crowning of the top U.S.Amateur the following years 1998, 2001, 2004, and 2006.

=== Michigan Amateur Tournaments ===
The Michigan Amateur tournaments were held at Muskegon Country Club in 2005 and 2013

=== Michigan Senior Amateur Tournament 2017 ===
Craig Adams of Spring Lake, Michigan, was crowned the Michigan senior amateur with 66. Commenting on his score of 66. Adams said, "Today I hit eight greens on both nines, and then the putter started heating up, and it just got a little silly after a while.”

== Ownership ==
The Muskegon Country Club was first owned by a non-profit corporation until 2014. On November 10, 2014, the MCC Partners LLC purchased the country club from the non-profit corporation largely to cover a 3 million dollar debt owed to Community Shores Bank.

The MCC Partners announced the selling of the Muskegon Country Club to RedWater Collection in April 2021. On September 10, 2021, Red Water Collection closed on the purchase of the Muskegon Country Club.

RedWater owns a "collection" of golf clubs and restaurants along the West Michigan Lakeshore, including the Ravines Golf Club in Saugatuck, Macatawa Golf Club in North Holland, and Muskegon Country Club in Muskegon. RedWater Collection also operated other restaurants and private country clubs in West Michigan, including StoneWater Country Club in Caledonia, Sunnybrook Country Club in Grandville, Thousand Oaks Golf Club, and Watermark Country Club in Grand Rapids.
