= Quogue, New York =

- Village
- Incorporated Village of Quogue
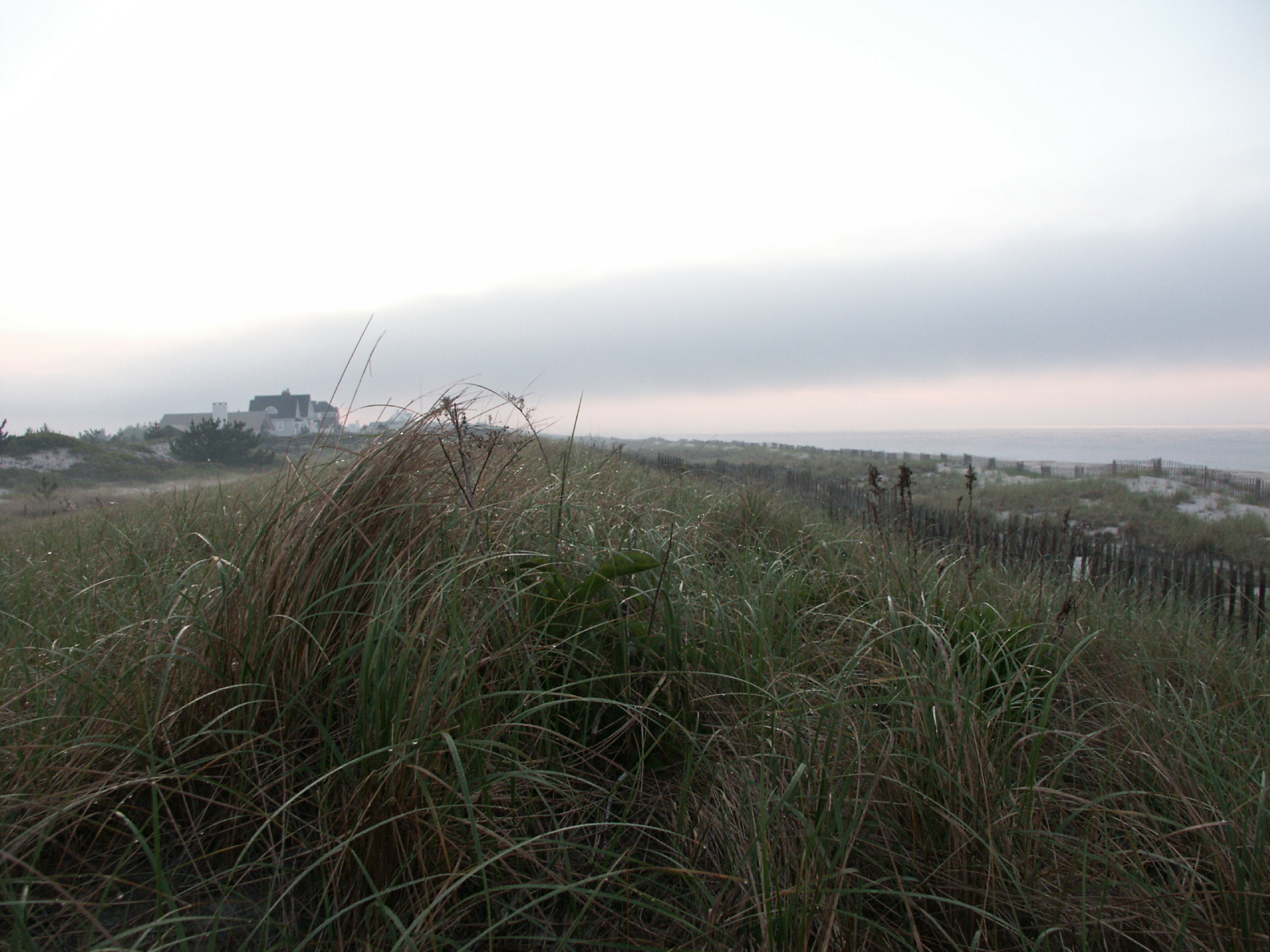
- Sunrise over the beaches of Quogue
- Nickname: Q
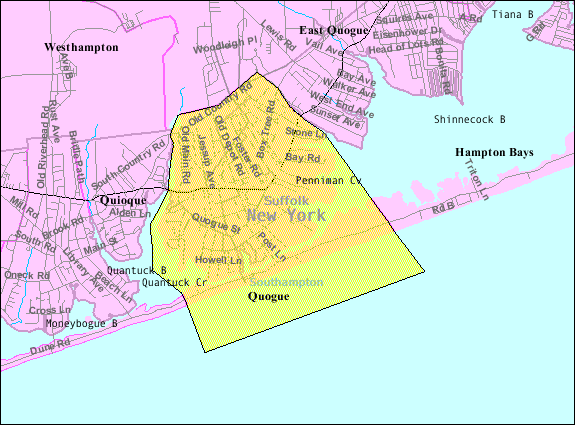

- Location on Long Island Location within the state of New York Location within the contiguous United States
- Coordinates: 40°49′22″N 72°36′5″W
- Country: United States
- State: New York
- County: Suffolk
- Town: Southampton
- Incorporated: 1928

Area
  - Total: 4.94 sq mi (12.79 km^{2})
  - Land: 4.17 sq mi (10.79 km^{2})
  - Water: 0.77 sq mi (1.99 km^{2})
- Elevation: 16 ft (5 m)

Population (2020)
  - Total: 1,662
  - Density: 398.8/sq mi (153.96/km^{2})
- Time zone: UTC-5 (Eastern (EST))
  - Summer (DST): UTC-4 (EDT)
- ZIP Code: 11959
- Area codes: 631, 934
- FIPS code: 36-60422
- GNIS feature ID: 0962113
- Website: www.villageofquogueny.gov

Quogue (/kwɒɡ/) is a village in the Town of Southampton in Suffolk County, on the South Fork of Long Island, in New York, United States. As of the 2020 census, Quogue had a population of 1,662.

== Geography ==
According to the United States Census Bureau, the village has a total area of 5.0 square miles (12.9 km^{2}), of which 4.2 square miles (10.9 km^{2}) is land and 0.77 square miles (2.0 km^{2}), or 15.57%, is water.

== Demographics ==
Historical population
Census	Pop.	Note	%±
1870	137		—
1880	194		41.6%
1930	758		—
1940	633		−16.5%
1950	625		−1.3%
1960	692		10.7%
1970	865		25.0%
1980	966		11.7%
1990	898		−7.0%
2000	1,018		13.4%
2010	967		−5.0%
2020	1,662		71.9%
U.S. Decennial Census

The following demographic information applies to the permanent residents of Quogue and not to summer residents:

As of the census of 2010, there were 967 people and 424 households residing in the village. The population density was 191.2 inhabitants per square mile (73.8/km^{2}). There were 1,623 housing units. The racial makeup of the village was 91.83% White, 1.75% African American, 0.2% Native American, 1.03% Asian, 1.96% other races, and 3.2% from two or more races. Hispanic or Latino of any race were 6.38% of the population.

There were 424 households, out of which 164 had children under the age of 18 living with them. 30.2% of all households were made up of individuals, and 13.2% had someone living alone who was 65 years of age or older. The average household size was 2.23 and the average family size was 2.75.

In the village, the population was spread out, with 164 under the age of 18, 34 from 18 to 24, 227 from 25 to 44, 293 from 45 to 64, and 238 who were 65 years of age or older.

== Education ==
The Village of Quogue is served primarily by the Quogue Union Free School District for Elementary Education. Secondary Students who reside within the Village attend Westhampton Beach Union Free School District.

== Landmarks ==
The Quogue Historic District is located within the Village.

== Cultural references ==
Quogue is mentioned in the song "Bungalow in Quogue" with words by P. G. Wodehouse and music by Jerome Kern featured in the 1917 Broadway musical The Riviera Girl.

== Notable people ==
- Kathleen Battle, opera singer
- Bill Beutel, television anchor
- Michael Forbes, politician
- Michael J. Fox, actor
- Kate French, actress and model
- Arthur Laurents
- Charles Lazarus, founder of Toys R Us
- Teo Macero, jazz saxophonist, composer, and record producer
- Alfred Thayer Mahan, U.S. rear admiral, geopolitician and historian
- Eli Manning, American football quarterback
- Marsha Norman, playwright
- John O'Hara, author
- Roger Rosenblatt, writer
- Gwen Verdon, four-time Tony Award—winning actress and dancer

== Gallery ==
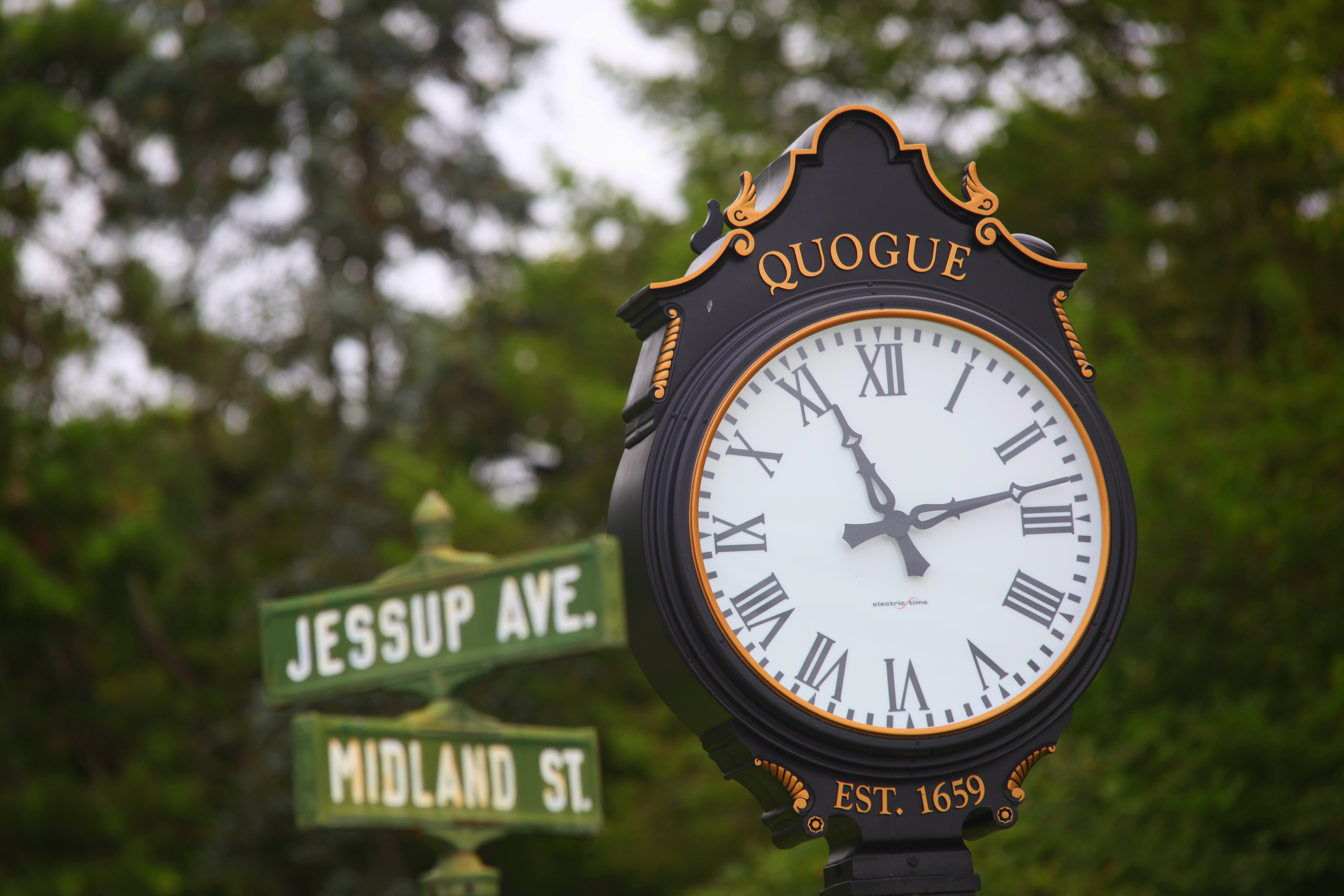
Quogue Historic District – Added to the State Register in December 2015 and National Register on February 2, 2016

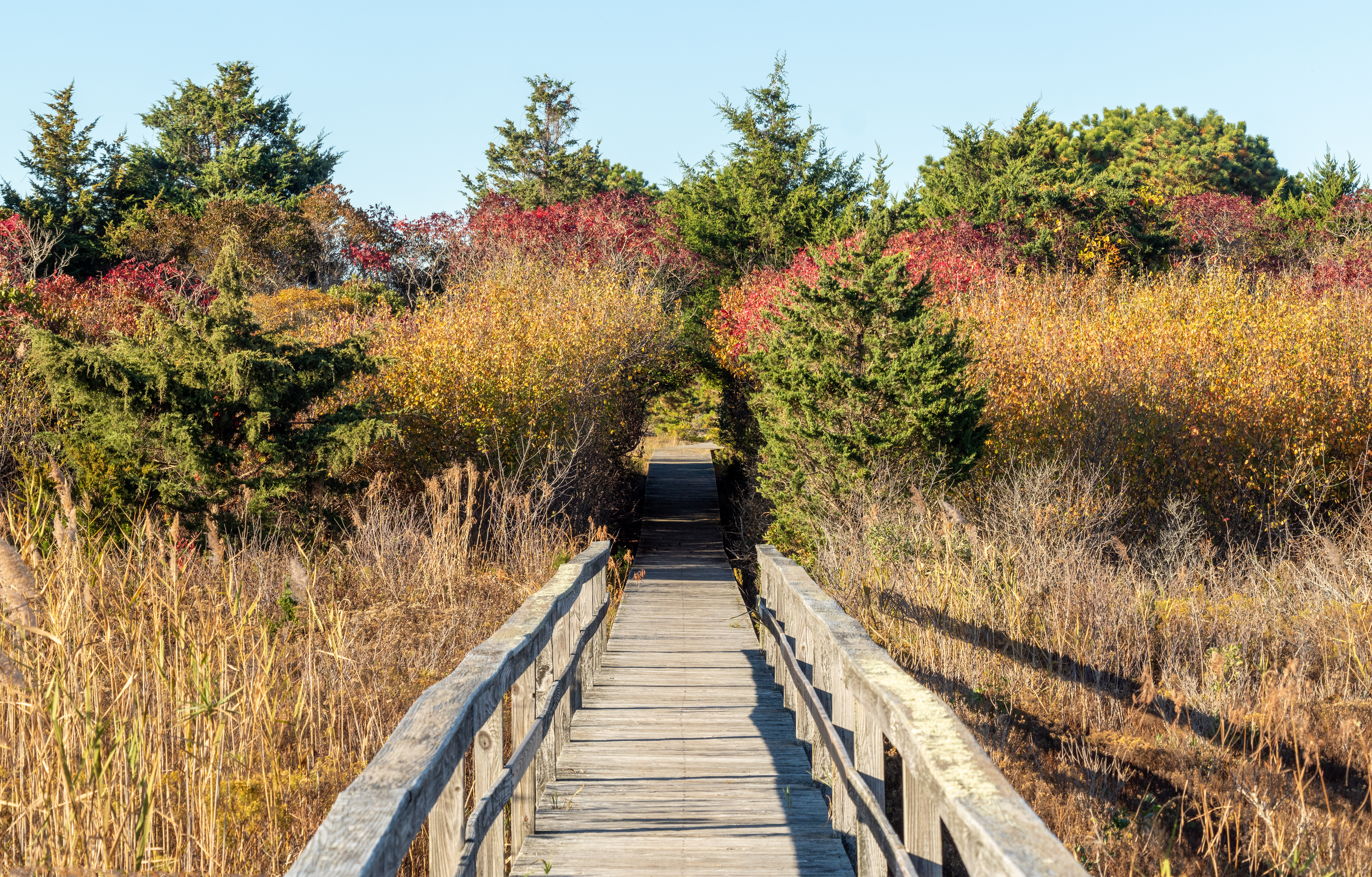
Quogue Village Wetlands Preserve

Preceded by Hampton Bays	The Hamptons	Succeeded by Westhampton Beach
