= 1996 Masters Tournament =

American golf tournament held in 1996

- Front cover of the 1996 Masters Journal

Tournament information
- Dates: April 11–14, 1996
- Location: Augusta, Georgia; 33.503°N 82.020°W
- Course: Augusta National Golf Club
- Organized by: Augusta National Golf Club
- Tour: PGA Tour

Statistics
- Par: 72
- Length: 6,925 yards (6,332 m)
- Field: 92 players, 44 after cut
- Cut: 146 (+2)
- Prize fund: US$2.5 million
- Winner's share: $450,000

Champion
- (England) Nick Faldo
- 276 (−12)

Location map
- Location in the United States Location in Georgia

The 1996 Masters Tournament was the 60th Masters Tournament, held April 11–14 at Augusta National Golf Club in Augusta, Georgia.

Nick Faldo won his third Masters and his sixth and final major title, five strokes ahead of runner-up Greg Norman. Faldo overcame a six-stroke deficit going into the final day as Norman, leader after each of the first three rounds, faltered down the stretch once again at Augusta. The win was the seventh by a European in the previous nine Masters. The first win by an Australian at the Masters came seventeen years later when Adam Scott won in 2013.

In the first round, Norman shot the second-ever 63 at the Masters (Nick Price had the first 63, in the third round in 1986). Opening with six pars, Norman birdied nine of the final twelve holes.

Faldo moved into second place with a 67 on Friday and stayed in second, though six shots behind, with a scrambling par on 18 late Saturday afternoon. The par meant that Faldo would be paired with Norman on Sunday which may have proved critical.

In the final round, Norman maintained a four shot lead through 7 holes, and then proceeded to lose five shots to par over the next five holes. Faldo picked up one birdie in that stretch to assume a two shot lead after Norman's tee shot on 12 found the water for a double-bogey. Any thoughts of Norman winning were dashed when his tee shot on the par three 16th also found the water. Faldo's 67 was the best round of the day while Norman's 78 was one of the worst rounds of the day, together yielding the greatest comeback/collapse in Masters history. In addition it tied the largest lead ever blown in a PGA Tour tournament. This record has yet to be broken.

None of the five amateurs made the cut, including 20-year-old Tiger Woods, in his second Masters. He returned as a professional the next year and won by 12 strokes.

== Field ==
1. Masters champions

Tommy Aaron, Seve Ballesteros, Gay Brewer, Billy Casper, Charles Coody, Fred Couples (9,12), Ben Crenshaw (9,12,13), Nick Faldo (3,9,13), Raymond Floyd (9), Doug Ford, Bernhard Langer, Sandy Lyle, Larry Mize, Jack Nicklaus, Arnold Palmer, Gary Player, Craig Stadler (11,12), Tom Watson (9), Ian Woosnam (9), Fuzzy Zoeller

- José María Olazábal (9) withdrew with a foot injury.
- George Archer, Jack Burke Jr., Bob Goalby, Ben Hogan, Herman Keiser, Cary Middlecoff, Byron Nelson, Henry Picard, Gene Sarazen, Sam Snead, and Art Wall Jr. did not play.

2. U.S. Open champions (last five years)

Ernie Els (11,12,13), Lee Janzen (9,10,12,13), Tom Kite, Corey Pavin (9,10,12,13), Payne Stewart (12,13)

3. The Open champions (last five years)

Ian Baker-Finch, John Daly (4,12), Tom Lehman (10,12,13), Greg Norman (9,10,12,13), Nick Price (4,10,13)

4. PGA champions (last five years)

Paul Azinger (9), Steve Elkington (9,11,12,13)

5. U.S. Amateur champion and runner-up

Buddy Marucci (a), Tiger Woods (a)

6. The Amateur champion

Gordon Sherry (a)

7. U.S. Amateur Public Links champion

Chris Wollmann (a)

8. U.S. Mid-Amateur champion

Jerry Courville Jr. (a)

9. Top 24 players and ties from the 1995 Masters

David Edwards, Brad Faxon (11), David Frost, David Gilford, Jay Haas (10,11,13), Brian Henninger, Scott Hoch (12,13), John Huston, Hale Irwin, Davis Love III (10,12,13), Phil Mickelson (10,12,13), Colin Montgomerie (11), Kenny Perry (13), Loren Roberts (13), Curtis Strange, Duffy Waldorf (10,12)

10. Top 16 players and ties from the 1995 U.S. Open

Brad Bryant (12,13), Bill Glasson, Neal Lancaster, Jeff Maggert (11), Mark McCumber, Frank Nobilo, Mark Roe, Vijay Singh (12,13), Jeff Sluman (11), Steve Stricker, Bob Tway (12,13)

11. Top eight players and ties from 1995 PGA Championship

Bob Estes, Justin Leonard (13), Steve Lowery, Mark O'Meara (12,13)

12. Winners of PGA Tour events since the previous Masters

Woody Austin (13), Mark Brooks, Mark Calcavecchia (13), Ed Dougherty, Fred Funk (13), Jim Furyk, Jim Gallagher Jr. (13), Paul Goydos, Tim Herron, Billy Mayfair (13), Scott McCarron, Paul Stankowski, Hal Sutton, Ted Tryba, D. A. Weibring

13. Top 30 players from the 1995 PGA Tour money list

David Duval, Scott Simpson, Kirk Triplett

14. Special foreign invitation

Michael Campbell, Alex Čejka, Satoshi Higashi, Masashi Ozaki, Costantino Rocca, Sam Torrance

== Round summaries ==
=== First round ===
Thursday, April 11, 1996

Place	Player	Score	To par
1	(Australia) Greg Norman	63	−9
2	(United States) Phil Mickelson	65	−7
T3	(United States) Scott Hoch	67	−5
T3	(United States) Bob Tway	67	−5
5	(United States) Lee Janzen	68	−4
T6	(England) Nick Faldo	69	−3
T6	(United States) Brad Faxon	69	−3
T6	(England) David Gilford	69	−3
T6	(United States) Scott Simpson	69	−3
T6	(Fiji) Vijay Singh	69	−3

==== Scorecard ====
First round

Hole	1	2	3	4	5	6	7	8	9	10	11	12	13	14	15	16	17	18
Par	4	5	4	3	4	3	4	5	4	4	4	3	5	4	5	3	4	4
(Australia) Norman	E	E	E	E	E	E	−1	−2	−3	−3	−3	−4	−5	−6	−7	−7	−8	−9

=== Second round ===
Friday, April 12, 1996

Place	Player	Score	To par
1	(Australia) Greg Norman	63-69=132	−12
2	(England) Nick Faldo	69-67=136	−8
T3	(South Africa) David Frost	70-68=138	−6
T3	(United States) Phil Mickelson	65-73=138	−6
T5	(United States) Lee Janzen	68-71=139	−5
T5	(United States) Bob Tway	67-72=139	−5
T7	(United States) Scott Hoch	67-73=140	−4
T7	(United States) Scott McCarron	70-70=140	−4
T7	(Fiji) Vijay Singh	69-71=140	−4
T10	(United States) Corey Pavin	75-66=141	−3
T10	(Wales) Ian Woosnam	72-69=141	−3

Amateurs: Woods (+6), Sherry (+11), Wollmann (+14), Courville Jr. (+16), Marucci (+16)

=== Third round ===
Saturday, April 13, 1996

Place	Player	Score	To par
1	(Australia) Greg Norman	63-69-71=203	−13
2	(England) Nick Faldo	69-67-73=209	−7
3	(United States) Phil Mickelson	65-73-72=210	−6
T4	(South Africa) David Frost	70-68-74=212	−4
T4	(United States) Scott McCarron	70-70-72=212	−4
T4	(United States) Duffy Waldorf	72-71-69=212	−4
T7	(United States) Scott Hoch	67-73-73=213	−3
T7	(United States) John Huston	71-71-71=213	−3
T9	(United States) David Duval	73-72-69=214	−2
T9	(South Africa) Ernie Els	71-71-72=214	−2
T9	(United States) Lee Janzen	68-71-75=214	−2
T9	(New Zealand) Frank Nobilo	71-71-72=214	−2
T9	(United States) Corey Pavin	75-66-73=214	−2
T9	(Fiji) Vijay Singh	69-71-74=214	−2
T9	(Wales) Ian Woosnam	72-69-73=214	−2

=== Final round ===
Sunday, April 14, 1996

==== Final leaderboard ====
Champion
(a) = amateur
(c) = past champion

Top 10
Place	Player	Score	To par	Money (US$)
1	(England) Nick Faldo (c)	69-67-73-67=276	−12	450,000
2	(Australia) Greg Norman	63-69-71-78=281	−7	270,000
3	(United States) Phil Mickelson	65-73-72-72=282	−6	170,000
4	(New Zealand) Frank Nobilo	71-71-72-69=283	−5	120,000
T5	(United States) Scott Hoch	67-73-73-71=284	−4	95,000
T5	(United States) Duffy Waldorf	72-71-69-72=284	−4	95,000
T7	(United States) Davis Love III	72-71-74-68=285	−3	77,933
T7	(United States) Jeff Maggert	71-73-72-69=285	−3	77,933
T7	(United States) Corey Pavin	75-66-73-71=285	−3	77,933
T10	(South Africa) David Frost	70-68-74-74=286	−2	65,000
T10	(United States) Scott McCarron	70-70-72-74=286	−2	65,000

Leaderboard below the top 10
Place	Player	Score	To par	Money ($)
T12	(South Africa) Ernie Els	71-71-72-73=287	−1	52,500
T12	(United States) Lee Janzen	68-71-75-73=287	−1	52,500
T12	(United States) Bob Tway	67-72-76-72=287	−1	52,500
T15	(United States) Mark Calcavecchia	71-73-71-73=288	E	43,750
T15	(United States) Fred Couples (c)	78-68-71-71=288	E	43,750
17	(United States) John Huston	71-71-71-76=289	+1	40,000
T18	(United States) Paul Azinger	70-74-76-70=290	+2	32,600
T18	(United States) David Duval	73-72-69-76=290	+2	32,600
T18	(United States) Tom Lehman	75-70-72-73=290	+2	32,600
T18	(United States) Mark O'Meara	72-71-75-72=290	+2	32,600
T18	(Zimbabwe) Nick Price	71-75-70-74=290	+2	32,600
T23	(United States) Larry Mize (c)	75-71-77-68=291	+3	25,000
T23	(United States) Loren Roberts	71-73-72-75=291	+3	25,000
T25	(United States) Brad Faxon	69-77-72-74=292	+4	21,000
T25	(United States) Raymond Floyd (c)	70-74-77-71=292	+4	21,000
T27	(United States) Bob Estes	71-71-79-72=293	+5	18,900
T27	(United States) Justin Leonard	72-74-75-72=293	+5	18,900
T29	(United States) John Daly	71-74-71-78=294	+6	15,571
T29	(United States) Jim Furyk	75-70-78-71=294	+6	15,571
T29	(United States) Jim Gallagher Jr.	70-76-77-71=294	+6	15,571
T29	(United States) Hale Irwin	74-71-77-72=294	+6	15,571
T29	(United States) Scott Simpson	69-76-76-73=294	+6	15,571
T29	(United States) Craig Stadler (c)	73-72-71-78=294	+6	15,571
T29	(Wales) Ian Woosnam (c)	72-69-73-80=294	+6	15,571
T36	(United States) Fred Funk	71-72-76-76=295	+7	12,333
T36	(United States) Jay Haas	70-73-75-77=295	+7	12,333
T36	(Germany) Bernhard Langer (c)	75-70-72-78=295	+7	12,333
T39	(Scotland) Colin Montgomerie	72-74-75-75=296	+8	11,050
T39	(Fiji) Vijay Singh	69-71-74-82=296	+8	11,050
T41	(United States) Steve Lowery	71-74-75-77=297	+9	10,050
T41	(United States) Jack Nicklaus (c)	70-73-76-78=297	+9	10,050
43	(Spain) Seve Ballesteros (c)	73-73-77-76=299	+11	9,300
44	(Germany) Alex Čejka	73-71-78-80=302	+14	8,800
CUT	(United States) Tommy Aaron (c)	71-76=147	+3	
CUT	(England) David Gilford	69-78=147	+3	
CUT	(United States) Jeff Sluman	74-73=147	+3	
CUT	(United States) Ted Tryba	72-75=147	+3	
CUT	(United States) Tom Watson (c)	75-72=147	+3	
CUT	(United States) Fuzzy Zoeller (c)	74-73=147	+3	
CUT	(United States) Mark Brooks	72-76=148	+4	
CUT	(United States) Bill Glasson	71-77=148	+4	
CUT	(Japan) Masashi Ozaki	71-77=148	+4	
CUT	(United States) Curtis Strange	71-77=148	+4	
CUT	(United States) Hal Sutton	72-76=148	+4	
CUT	(New Zealand) Michael Campbell	73-76=149	+5	
CUT	(Scotland) Sandy Lyle (c)	75-74=149	+5	
CUT	(South Africa) Gary Player (c)	73-76=149	+5	
CUT	(United States) Steve Stricker	80-69=149	+5	
CUT	(United States) Neal Lancaster	76-74=150	+6	
CUT	(United States) Arnold Palmer (c)	74-76=150	+6	
CUT	(United States) Payne Stewart	74-76=150	+6	
CUT	(United States) Tiger Woods (a)	75-75=150	+6	
CUT	(United States) Ben Crenshaw (c)	77-74=151	+7	
CUT	(United States) Ed Dougherty	76-75=151	+7	
CUT	(Japan) Satoshi Higashi	76-75=151	+7	
CUT	(Scotland) Sam Torrance	80-71=151	+7	
CUT	(United States) Kirk Triplett	76-75=151	+7	
CUT	(United States) Gay Brewer (c)	75-77=152	+8	
CUT	(United States) Tim Herron	76-76=152	+8	
CUT	(United States) Tom Kite	75-77=152	+8	
CUT	(United States) Kenny Perry	75-77=152	+8	
CUT	(United States) Paul Stankowski	74-78=152	+8	
CUT	(United States) Woody Austin	79-74=153	+9	
CUT	(United States) Brad Bryant	78-75=153	+9	
CUT	(United States) David Edwards	79-74=153	+9	
CUT	(Italy) Costantino Rocca	78-75=153	+9	
CUT	(England) Mark Roe	74-79=153	+9	
CUT	(United States) Billy Mayfair	77-77=154	+10	
CUT	(Australia) Steve Elkington	76-79=155	+11	
CUT	(United States) Brian Henninger	76-79=155	+11	
CUT	(Scotland) Gordon Sherry (a)	78-77=155	+11	
CUT	(United States) D. A. Weibring	74-81=155	+11	
CUT	(Australia) Ian Baker-Finch	78-79=157	+13	
CUT	(United States) Paul Goydos	74-83=157	+13	
CUT	(United States) Chris Wollmann (a)	79-79=158	+14	
CUT	(United States) Charles Coody (c)	82-78=160	+16	
CUT	(United States) Jerry Courville Jr. (a)	78-82=160	+16	
CUT	(United States) Buddy Marucci (a)	79-81=160	+16	
CUT	(United States) Mark McCumber	78-82=160	+16	
CUT	(United States) Billy Casper (c)	75-86=161	+17	
CUT	(United States) Doug Ford (c)	81-88=169	+25	

==== Scorecard ====
Hole	1	2	3	4	5	6	7	8	9	10	11	12	13	14	15	16	17	18
Par	4	5	4	3	4	3	4	5	4	4	4	3	5	4	5	3	4	4
(England) Faldo	−7	−8	−8	−8	−7	−8	−8	−9	−9	−9	−9	−9	−10	−10	−11	−11	−11	−12
(Australia) Norman	−12	−13	−13	−12	−12	−12	−12	−12	−11	−10	−9	−7	−8	−8	−9	−7	−7	−7
(United States) Mickelson	−6	−7	−7	−6	−6	−7	−6	−5	−5	−5	−5	−4	−5	−4	−6	−6	−6	−6
(New Zealand) Nobilo	−2	−2	−2	−2	−1	−1	−1	−2	−3	−4	−5	−4	−5	−5	−5	−6	−6	−5
(United States) Hoch	−2	−3	−3	−2	−2	−2	−2	−3	−3	−3	−3	−4	−5	−4	−4	−4	−4	−4
(United States) Waldorf	−4	−6	−6	−5	−5	−4	−5	−5	−5	−5	−5	−5	−4	−5	−5	−5	−5	−4
(South Africa) Frost	−4	−4	−4	−4	−3	−3	−1	−2	−2	−2	−2	−2	−3	−3	−3	−4	−3	−2
(United States) McCarron	−4	−4	−3	−3	−2	−2	−2	−2	−2	−1	−1	−1	−1	−1	−2	−2	−2	−2

Cumulative tournament scores, relative to par

Eagle	Birdie	Bogey	Double bogey
