= Jeff Woodland =

Australian professional golfer (born 1957)

Personal information
- Nationality: Australia
- Born: 28 February 1957 (age 69) Papua, Papua New Guinea
- Height: 6 ft 0 in (1.83 m)
- Weight: 170 lb (77 kg; 12 st)

Career
- Sport: Golf
- Turned professional: 1978
- Former tours: PGA Tour; Nationwide Tour
- Professional wins: 4

Number of wins by tour
- Korn Ferry Tour: 3
- Other: 1

Best results in major championships
- Masters Tournament: DNP
- PGA Championship: DNP
- U.S. Open: DNP
- The Open Championship: T39: 1989

Jeff Woodland (born 28 February 1957) is an Australian professional golfer who played on the PGA Tour and PGA Tour of Australasia.

== Professional career ==
Woodland joined the Ben Hogan Tour in 1991 and had a very successful rookie year, winning the Ben Hogan Dakota Dunes Open while recording nine top-10 finishes. The following year he won two tournaments, the Ben Hogan Wichita Charity Classic and the Ben Hogan Utah Classic while recording nine top-10 finishes en route to a 6th-place finishes on the money list, good enough to earn his PGA Tour card. He struggled in his rookie year on Tour but retained his card through qualifying school. He recorded his best finish on the PGA Tour in 1994 at the GTE Byron Nelson Golf Classic when he finished in a tie for eighth. He split time between the PGA and Nationwide Tour in 1995.

== Professional wins (5) ==
=== Ben Hogan Tour wins (3) ===
No.	Date	Tournament	Winning score	Margin of victory	Runner(s)-up
1	4 Aug 1991	Ben Hogan Dakota Dunes Open	−20 (66-70-60=196)	1 stroke	(Trinidad and Tobago) Stephen Ames, (United States) Kel Devlin, (United States) Kelly Gibson
2	9 Aug 1992	Ben Hogan Wichita Charity Classic	−12 (70-65-69=204)	Playoff	(United States) Bob May
3	27 Sep 1992	Ben Hogan Utah Classic	−14 (67-68-67=202)	3 strokes	(United States) David Jackson, (United States) Brian Kamm

Ben Hogan Tour playoff record (1–0)

No.	Year	Tournament	Opponent	Result
1	1992	Ben Hogan Wichita Charity Classic	(United States) Bob May	Won with birdie on sixth extra hole

=== Other wins (2) ===
- 1988 Fiji Open
- 1989 Jack Newton Celebrity Classic (tie with Mike Colandro)

== Playoff record ==
PGA Tour of Australia playoff record (0–1)

No.	Year	Tournament	Opponent	Result
1	1987	Queensland PGA Championship	(Australia) Peter Senior	Lost to bogey on first extra hole

== Results in major championships ==
Tournament	1989	1990
The Open Championship	T39	CUT

Note: Woodland only played in The Open Championship.
CUT = missed the half-way cut
"T" = tied

== See also ==
- 1992 Ben Hogan Tour graduates
- 1993 PGA Tour Qualifying School graduates
