= Pat Bates =

American professional golfer (born 1969)

Personal information
- Full name: Patrick Alfred Bates
- Nationality: United States
- Born: July 26, 1969 (age 57) St. Louis, Missouri, U.S.
- Height: 6 ft 3 in (1.91 m)
- Weight: 195 lb (88 kg; 13.9 st)

Career
- Sport: Golf
- College: University of Florida
- Turned professional: 1991
- Former tours: PGA Tour; Nationwide Tour
- Professional wins: 6

Number of wins by tour
- Korn Ferry Tour: 5 (Tied 7th all time)
- Other: 1

Patrick Alfred Bates (born July 26, 1969) is an American professional golfer who has played on the PGA Tour and who served as the head men's golf coach at the University of Central Oklahoma from 2011 to 2016.

== Early life and amateur career ==
Bates was born in St. Louis, Missouri. He accepted an athletic scholarship to attend the University of Florida in Gainesville, Florida, where he played for coach Buddy Alexander's Florida Gators men's golf team in National Collegiate Athletic Association (NCAA) competition from 1988 to 1991. He received first-team All-Southeastern Conference (SEC) honors and was an All-American in 1989, 1990 and 1991. Bates graduated from Florida with a bachelor's degree in communications process and disorders.

== Professional career ==
Bates played on the Nike Tour in 1994. He earned a promotion to the PGA Tour by finishing third on the money list. He played poorly on the 1995 PGA Tour and returned to the Nike Tour. He played on the PGA Tour's developmental tour 1996 to 2001. In 2001, Bates won three events on the Buy.com Tour which gave him an immediate promotion to the PGA Tour. He returned to the PGA Tour for the 2002, 2003, and 2004 seasons. His best finish in a PGA Tour event was a tie for fifth at the Bank of America Colonial in 2003.

== Personal life ==
His wife, Kristine Tewell, is the daughter of former PGA Tour professional Doug Tewell.

== Professional wins (6) ==
=== Buy.com Tour wins (5) ===
Legend
Tour Championships (1)
Other Buy.com Tour (4)

| No. | Date | Tournament | Winning score | Margin of victory | Runner(s)-up |
|---|---|---|---|---|---|
| 1 | Aug 7, 1994 | Nike Dakota Dunes Open | −12 (74-68-69-65=276) | 2 strokes | (United States) Rex Caldwell, (United States) Gary Webb |
| 2 | Sep 7, 1997 | Nike Colorado Classic | −17 (71-66-64-66=267) | 1 stroke | (United States) J. L. Lewis |
| 3 | Jul 22, 2001 | Buy.com Siouxland Open | −15 (66-67-70-70=273) | 1 stroke | (United States) Matt Kuchar, (United States) Eric Meeks |
| 4 | Oct 21, 2001 | Buy.com Shreveport Open | −20 (66-68-67-67=268) | 1 stroke | (United States) Brian Kamm |
| 5 | Oct 28, 2001 | Buy.com Tour Championship | −4 (71-72-72-69=284) | 3 strokes | (United States) Tom Carter, (South Africa) Brenden Pappas |

Buy.com Tour playoff record (0–2)

| No. | Year | Tournament | Opponent(s) | Result |
|---|---|---|---|---|
| 1 | 1994 | Nike Shreveport Open | (United States) Omar Uresti | Lost to birdie on sixth extra hole |
| 2 | 2000 | Buy.com Ozarks Open | (United States) Mike Heinen, (United States) Pat Perez | Perez won with birdie on first extra hole |

=== Other wins (1) ===
- 1993 Massachusetts Open

== See also ==
- 1994 Nike Tour graduates
- 2001 Buy.com Tour graduates
- List of Florida Gators men's golfers on the PGA Tour
- List of golfers with most Web.com Tour wins
