= Steve Duplantis =

Canadian caddie

- Born: September 20, 1972; Brampton, Ontario
- Status: Divorced
- Died: January 23, 2008 (aged 35); Del Mar, California
- Occupation: Caddie
- Children: 1 Daughter

Steve Duplantis (September 20, 1972 – January 23, 2008) was a pro golf caddie. He worked with several golfers until his death.

== Career and personal life ==
Duplantis was born in Brampton in Canada. He began caddying for Clarence Rose in 1993, after his own golf career failed.

He worked with Jim Furyk early in his career from 1994 until 1999, but he is best known for his time with Rich Beem which was chronicled by the writer Alan Shipnuck in the best-selling book Bud, Sweat and Tees, during which Beem won the Kemper Open. Duplantis also caddied for Tommy Armour III when he set the PGA Tour's 72-hole scoring record at the Texas Open in 2003 and had also caddied for other golfers on both the PGA Tour and European Tour, including Daniel Chopra, Garrett Willis, Gabriel Hjertstedt and David Branshaw. At the time of his death Duplantis was working with Eric Axley.

Beem's victory at the Kemper Open in 1999 was only his 12th start on tour, and Duplantis was hailed for playing a big part in the victory, which Jim Nantz hailed as one "of the greatest caddying performances you will ever see.". However, Beem and Duplantis would stop working together soon afterwards; Shipnuck attributes this to their similarities.

Duplantis featured prominently in Shipnuck's book Bud, Sweat and Tees. The book, which followed Beem and Duplantis as they played various events during Beem's rookie season on the PGA Tour, spoke about Duplantis' relationship with his ex-wife and his young daughter Sierra. After Beem won the PGA Championship in 2002 the book became a best-seller.

Duplantis was referred to as "Asbestos" because he was thought to be fireproof. He had a well-earned reputation for tardiness, and this led several golfers to fire him. Despite this, he maintained a reputation as one of the best caddies working the circuit. John Maginnes wrote in his column on pgatour.com that "Even on those mornings when the night's activities lingered in the air, Steve was still an exceptional caddy". After his death caddy Patrick Smith said that "He raised the level of every player he worked for. He could take guys who were marginal and they would play well".

== Death ==
In the morning of January 23, 2008 shortly after midnight, Duplantis stepped off a curb in Del Mar, California, and was hit by a taxi cab driver. Sgt. Randy Webb of the San Diego County Sheriff's Department reported that he died at the scene. Duplantis was to caddie for Eric Axley at the Buick Invitational later that week. On the opening day of play many caddies wore ribbons to commemorate Duplantis.
