= Rich Beem =

American professional golfer (born 1970)

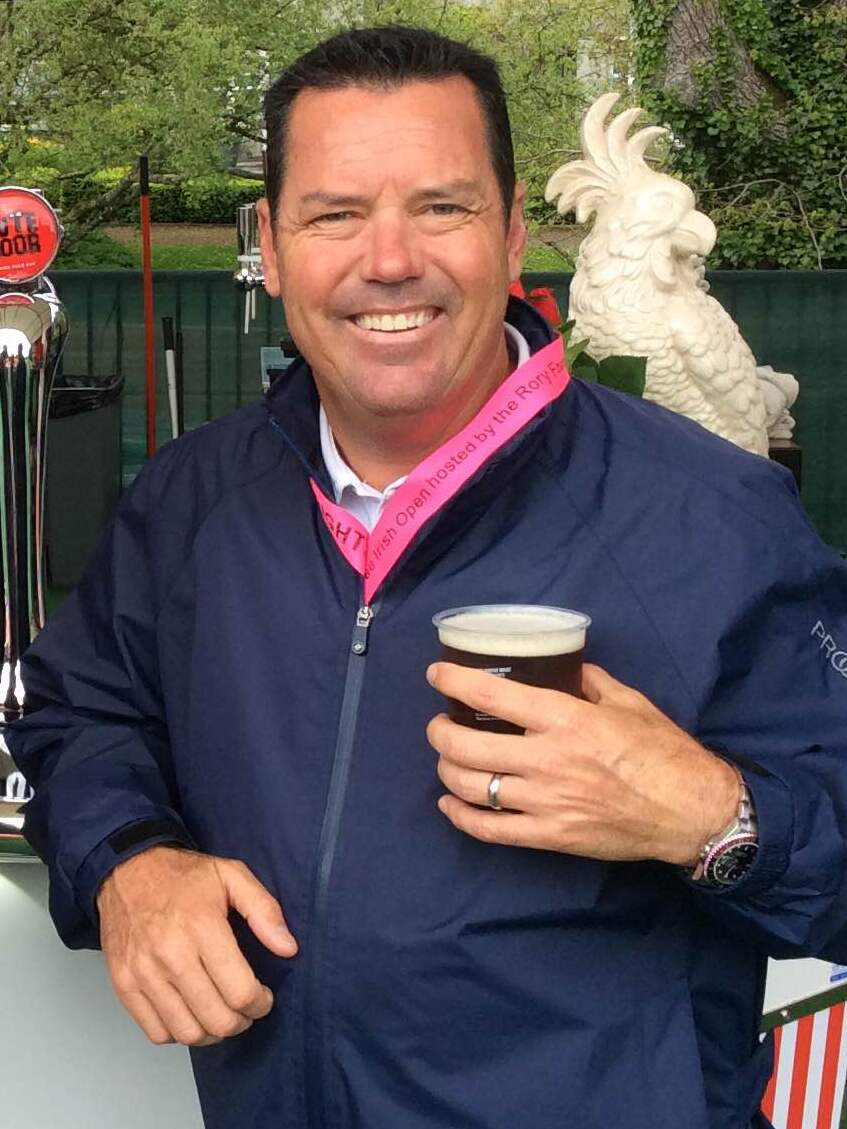
- Beem in 2016

Personal information
- Full name: Richard Michael Beem
- Nationality: United States
- Born: August 24, 1970 (age 56) Phoenix, Arizona, U.S.
- Height: 5 ft 8 in (173 cm)
- Weight: 165 lb (75 kg; 11.8 st)

Career
- Sport: Golf
- College: New Mexico State University
- Turned professional: 1994
- Current tours: PGA Tour Champions; European Senior Tour
- Former tours: PGA Tour; European Tour
- Professional wins: 4
- Highest ranking: 16 (July 27, 2003)

Number of wins by tour
- PGA Tour: 3
- European Tour: 1
- Other: 1

Best results in major championships (wins: 1)
- Masters Tournament: T15: 2003
- PGA Championship: Won: 2002
- U.S. Open: T78: 2008
- The Open Championship: T20: 2007

Richard Michael Beem (born August 24, 1970) is an American professional golfer who played on the PGA Tour and is best known for his upset victory at the 2002 PGA Championship.

== Early life and amateur career ==
Beem was born in Phoenix, Arizona, grew up in El Paso, Texas, and played college golf at New Mexico State University in Las Cruces.

== Professional career ==
In 1994, Beem turned professional. His early career was broken up by a spell in Seattle selling car stereos and cell phones. He later regained interest after J. P. Hayes won the 1998 Buick Classic.

This changed in 1999 when Beem won the Kemper Open as a rookie. His career took a further leap forward in 2002 with a victory at The International in Castle Rock, Colorado.

Two weeks later, Beem won the 2002 PGA Championship at Hazeltine National, one of golf's four major tournaments. He shot a par 72 in the first round, but followed that with a six-under 66 in the second round to pull into a five-way tie for first place. In the third round, he again shot 72 and was the second place player, three strokes behind leader Justin Leonard. In the fourth round, Beem fended off Tiger Woods, who birdied his last four holes but finished one shot behind Beem, who shot a final round 68 to Woods' 67. This victory helped establish Beem in the top 20 of the Official World Golf Ranking.

Until this win, Beem was best known for the book Bud, Sweat and Tees: A Walk on the Wild Side of the PGA Tour by Alan Shipnuck, which profiled his rookie year on the PGA Tour and the often wild lifestyle of him and his caddie, Steve Duplantis.

Following his victory at the 2002 PGA Championship, Rich Beem has not won another PGA Tour event. His most notable finishes since include a runner‑up finish to Tiger Woods at the 2003 Western Open and a playoff loss to Phil Mickelson at the 2005 Bellsouth Classic.

At the 2007 Nissan Open at Riviera, Beem made a hole-in-one at the 14th hole on live television on Saturday to win a new red Altima coupe, which he immediately ascended, embraced, and sat atop of in triumph. The sequence was later made into a Nissan commercial. Beem credited Peter Jacobsen for inspiring his reaction; Jacobsen aced the same hole in 1994 and hopped into the nearby 300ZX convertible and pretended to drive it.

Beem was sidelined in 2010 after undergoing back surgery to repair damage to his C6 and C7 vertebrae. While Beem was expected to only miss six weeks, rehabilitation issues caused the layoff to encompass the remainder of the 2010 season. Beem played the 2011 season on a medical exemption that required him to make $658,100 in 17 events. He missed the first six cuts of the 2011 season before making the cut at the Valero Texas Open. He finished tied for 15th. Beem made just five cuts in 21 events. As a result, he lost his tour card and played the remainder of the season out of the "past champions" category in 2012. He played on the European Tour in 2012, the last year of his ten-year exemption on that tour for winning the 2002 PGA Championship.

In 2015, Beem joined Sky Sports as a television commentator and golf analyst. He also planned to play at the UBS Hong Kong Open, but gave up his sponsor exemption to allow Ian Poulter to maintain his European Tour membership. By the late 2010s, Beem had missed the cut in 11 of the 15 PGA Championships he played in since his 2002 victory. At one point, he considered that he no longer belonged in the field; however, fellow PGA golfer David Duval encouraged him to continue competing. In 2020, Beem was a color commentator for the video game PGA Tour 2K21. Two years later, he returned in the same role for the PGA Tour 2K23.

== Personal life ==
Beem resides in Austin, Texas.

== Professional wins (4) ==
=== PGA Tour wins (3) ===
Legend
Major championships (1)
Other PGA Tour (2)

| No. | Date | Tournament | Winning score | Margin of victory | Runner(s)-up |
|---|---|---|---|---|---|
| 1 | May 30, 1999 | Kemper Open | −10 (66-67-71-70=274) | 1 stroke | (United States) Bill Glasson, (Australia) Bradley Hughes |
| 2 | Aug 4, 2002 | The International | 44 pts (10-0-15-19=44) | 1 point | (United States) Steve Lowery |
| 3 | Aug 18, 2002 | PGA Championship | −10 (72-66-72-68=278) | 1 stroke | (United States) Tiger Woods |

PGA Tour playoff record (0–1)

| No. | Year | Tournament | Opponents | Result |
|---|---|---|---|---|
| 1 | 2005 | BellSouth Classic | (India) Arjun Atwal, (United States) Brandt Jobe, (United States) Phil Mickelson, (Spain) José María Olazábal | Mickelson won with birdie on fourth extra hole Olazábal eliminated by par on third hole Atwal and Jobe eliminated by par on first hole |

=== European Tour wins (1) ===
Legend
Major championships (1)
Other European Tour (0)

| No. | Date | Tournament | Winning score | Margin of victory | Runner-up |
|---|---|---|---|---|---|
| 1 | Aug 18, 2002 | PGA Championship | −10 (72-66-72-68=278) | 1 stroke | (United States) Tiger Woods |

=== Other wins (1) ===
| No. | Date | Tournament | Winning score | Margin of victory | Runners-up |
|---|---|---|---|---|---|
| 1 | Nov 17, 2002 | Hyundai Team Matches (with (Australia) Peter Lonard) | 2 and 1 | | (United States) Mark Calcavecchia and (United States) Fred Couples |

== Major championships ==
=== Wins (1) ===
| Year | Championship | 54 holes | Winning score | Margin | Runner-up |
|---|---|---|---|---|---|
| 2002 | PGA Championship | 3 shot deficit | −10 (72-66-72-68=278) | 1 stroke | (United States) Tiger Woods |

=== Results timeline ===
Results not in chronological order in 2020.

| Tournament | 1999 | 2000 | 2001 | 2002 | 2003 | 2004 | 2005 | 2006 | 2007 | 2008 | 2009 |
|---|---|---|---|---|---|---|---|---|---|---|---|
| Masters Tournament | | | | | T15 | CUT | CUT | T42 | 54 | | |
| U.S. Open | | | CUT | | CUT | CUT | CUT | CUT | CUT | T78 | |
| The Open Championship | CUT | | | | T43 | T71 | CUT | CUT | T20 | WD | |
| PGA Championship | T70 | | | 1 | CUT | CUT | CUT | T49 | CUT | CUT | T43 |

| Tournament | 2010 | 2011 | 2012 | 2013 | 2014 | 2015 | 2016 | 2017 | 2018 |
|---|---|---|---|---|---|---|---|---|---|
| Masters Tournament | | | | | | | | | |
| U.S. Open | | | | | | | | | |
| The Open Championship | | | | | | | | | |
| PGA Championship | | CUT | T36 | CUT | CUT | CUT | T73 | CUT | CUT |

| Tournament | 2019 | 2020 | 2021 | 2022 | 2023 | 2024 |
|---|---|---|---|---|---|---|
| Masters Tournament | | | | | | |
| PGA Championship | T80 | CUT | CUT | CUT | | CUT |
| U.S. Open | | | | | | |
| The Open Championship | | NT | | | | |

Win
Top 10
Did not play

CUT = missed the half-way cut
"T" indicates a tie for a place
WD = Withdrew
NT = No tournament due to COVID-19 pandemic

=== Summary ===
| Tournament | Wins | 2nd | 3rd | Top-5 | Top-10 | Top-25 | Events | Cuts made |
|---|---|---|---|---|---|---|---|---|
| Masters Tournament | 0 | 0 | 0 | 0 | 0 | 1 | 5 | 3 |
| PGA Championship | 1 | 0 | 0 | 1 | 1 | 1 | 22 | 7 |
| U.S. Open | 0 | 0 | 0 | 0 | 0 | 0 | 7 | 1 |
| The Open Championship | 0 | 0 | 0 | 0 | 0 | 1 | 7 | 3 |
| Totals | 1 | 0 | 0 | 1 | 1 | 3 | 41 | 14 |

- Most consecutive cuts made – 2 (2002 PGA – 2003 Masters)
- Longest streak of top-10s – 1

== Results in The Players Championship ==
| Tournament | 2000 | 2001 | 2002 | 2003 | 2004 | 2005 | 2006 | 2007 | 2008 |
|---|---|---|---|---|---|---|---|---|---|
| The Players Championship | CUT | | T44 | CUT | CUT | CUT | T66 | T58 | CUT |

Did not play

CUT = missed the halfway cut
"T" indicates a tie for a place

== Results in World Golf Championships ==
| Tournament | 2002 | 2003 | 2004 |
|---|---|---|---|
| Match Play | | R64 | R64 |
| Championship | T49 | T59 | |
| Invitational | T6 | T67 | |

Top 10
Did not play

QF, R16, R32, R64 = Round in which player lost in match play
"T" = Tied

== Results in senior major championships ==
| Tournament | 2021 | 2022 | 2023 | 2024 | 2025 | 2026 |
|---|---|---|---|---|---|---|
| Senior PGA Championship | T40 | WD | | CUT | CUT | |
| The Tradition | | | | | | |
| U.S. Senior Open | CUT | | | | | |
| Senior Players Championship | | | | | | |
| The Senior Open Championship | T11 | CUT | 70 | CUT | CUT | CUT |

Did not play

CUT = missed the halfway cut
WD = withdrew
"T" indicates a tie for a place

== U.S. national team appearances ==
Professional

- Wendy's 3-Tour Challenge (representing PGA Tour): 2002 (winners)

== See also ==
- 1998 PGA Tour Qualifying School graduates
- List of men's major championships winning golfers
