= Brian Henninger =

American professional golfer

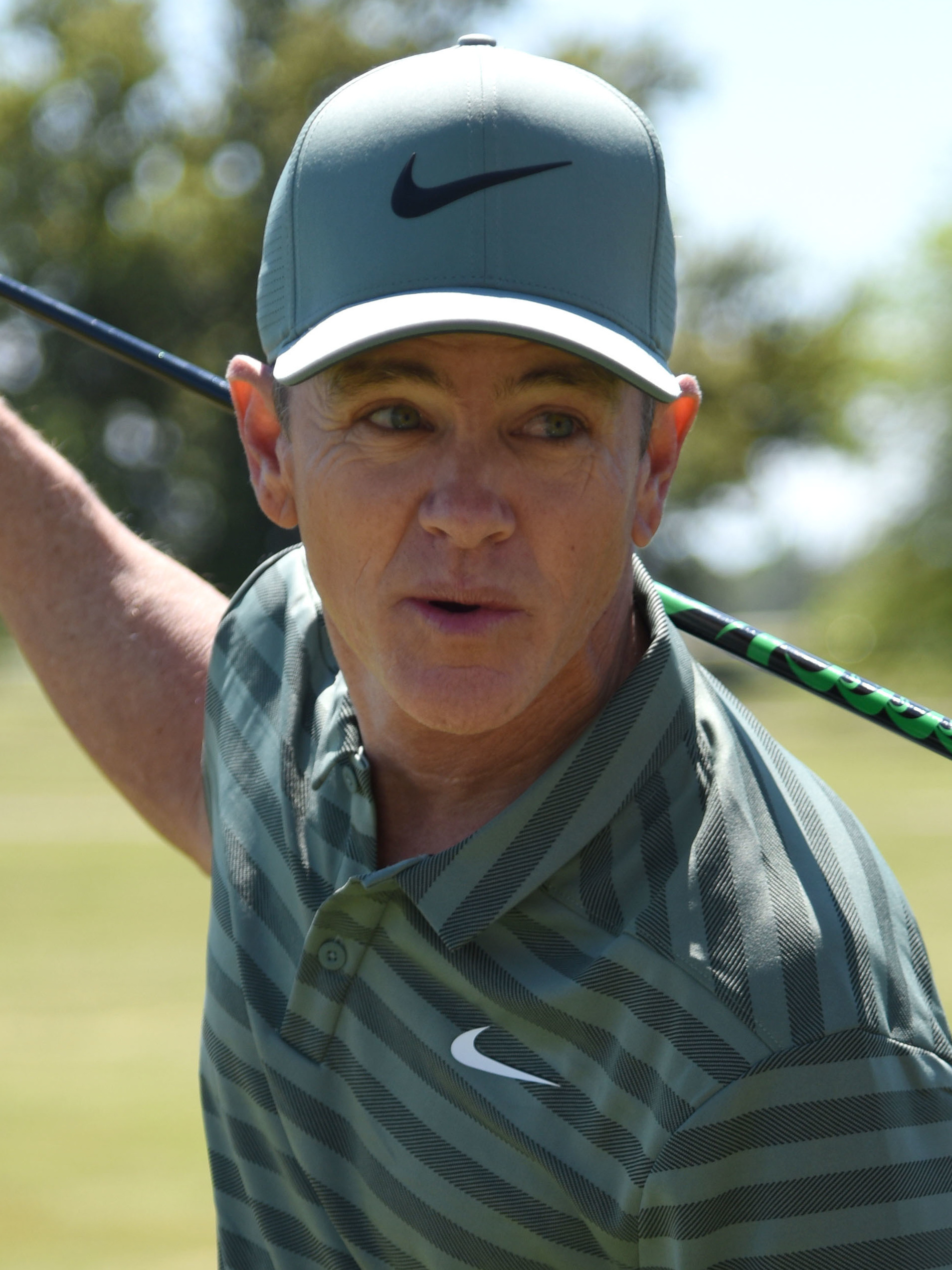
- Henninger in 2018

Personal information
- Full name: Brian Hatfield Henninger
- Nationality: United States
- Born: October 19, 1962 (age 64) Sacramento, California, U.S.
- Height: 5 ft 8 in (1.73 m)
- Weight: 150 lb (68 kg; 11 st)

Career
- Sport: Golf
- College: USC
- Turned professional: 1987
- Former tours: PGA Tour; PGA Tour Champions
- Professional wins: 6

Number of wins by tour
- PGA Tour: 2
- Korn Ferry Tour: 3

Best results in major championships
- Masters Tournament: T10: 1995
- PGA Championship: T46: 2000
- U.S. Open: T66: 2003
- The Open Championship: DNP

Brian Hatfield Henninger (born October 19, 1962) is an American professional golfer who played on the PGA Tour and the Nationwide Tour. He has won two tournaments on the PGA Tour and three on the Nationwide Tour.

== Early life ==
In 1962, Henninger was born in Sacramento, California. He attended the University of Southern California and walked on to the golf team there.

== Professional career ==
In 1987, Henninger turned pro. He played on a west coast minitour, the Golden State Golf Tour. In 1992, he won three tournaments on the Ben Hogan Tour and he joined the PGA Tour in 1993. Henninger's first PGA tournament win came in a playoff at the 1994 Deposit Guaranty Golf Classic in Madison, Mississippi, which was shortened by rain to only 36 holes (this win predated current PGA Tour rules which require 54 holes to be played for a tournament to be considered "official"). His only other PGA Tour win came in the same tournament (renamed as the Southern Farm Bureau Classic) in 1999 when he won by three strokes in another rain-shortened affair. Henninger's best result in a major championship was in the 1995 Masters Tournament, in which he shared the lead after 54 holes but closed with a disappointing 76, leaving him in a tie for 10th place.

Henninger's results in the early 2000s were disappointing, and he lost his PGA Tour card after the 2002 season. He spent the majority of the remaining decade on the Nationwide Tour, playing in PGA Tour events whenever possible as an alternate, through exemptions, or past champion status. After turning 50, Henninger joined the Champions Tour.

Henninger was one of the primary subjects of John Feinstein's 1995 book, A Good Walk Spoiled, which detailed life inside the ropes of the PGA Tour.

== Personal life ==
Henninger resides in Wilsonville, Oregon, with his wife and three children. His Brian Henninger Foundation has donated over $700,000 to numerous causes, mostly located in the Pacific Northwest.

== Amateur wins ==
this list may be incomplete

- 1986 Pacific Coast Amateur

== Professional wins (6) ==
=== PGA Tour wins (2) ===
No.	Date	Tournament	Winning score	Margin of victory	Runner-up
1	Jul 17, 1994	Deposit Guaranty Golf Classic	−9 (67-68=135)*	Playoff	(United States) Mike Sullivan
2	Oct 31, 1999	Southern Farm Bureau Classic (2)	−14 (67-66-69=202)*	3 strokes	(United States) Chris DiMarco

*Note: Tournament shortened to 36/54 holes.

PGA Tour playoff record (1–0)

No.	Year	Tournament	Opponent	Result
1	1994	Deposit Guaranty Golf Classic	(United States) Mike Sullivan	Won with birdie on first extra hole

=== Ben Hogan Tour wins (3) ===
No.	Date	Tournament	Winning score	Margin of victory	Runner(s)-up
1	Mar 1, 1992	Ben Hogan South Texas Open	−8 (66-69-73=208)	Playoff	(United States) Bob Burns
2	Apr 26, 1992	Ben Hogan Macon Open	−11 (64-72-69=205)	1 stroke	(United States) Ted Tryba
3	May 17, 1992	Ben Hogan Knoxville Open	−13 (70-67-63=200)	2 strokes	(United States) Curt Byrum, (United States) Tom R. Shaw, (Canada) Rick Todd

Ben Hogan Tour playoff record (1–0)

No.	Year	Tournament	Opponent	Result
1	1992	Ben Hogan South Texas Open	(United States) Bob Burns	Won with birdie on first extra hole

=== Other wins (1) ===
No.	Date	Tournament	Winning score	Margin of victory	Runners-up
1	Aug 6, 2002	Fred Meyer Challenge (with (United States) Scott McCarron)	−22 (60-62=122)	2 strokes	(United States) Stewart Cink and (United States) David Toms

== Results in major championships ==
Tournament	1994	1995	1996	1997	1998	1999	2000	2001	2002	2003
Masters Tournament		T10	CUT							
U.S. Open			CUT				CUT	CUT		T66
PGA Championship	T75	CUT		T49			T46			

Note: Henninger never played in The Open Championship.

Top 10
Did not play

CUT = missed the half-way cut
"T" = tied

== See also ==
- 1992 Ben Hogan Tour graduates
- 1996 PGA Tour Qualifying School graduates
