= 1991 U.S. Open =

1991 U.S. Open may refer to:

- 1991 U.S. Open (golf), a major golf tournament
- 1991 US Open (tennis), a Grand Slam tennis tournament
