= Colorado Classic =

Colorado Classic may refer to:

- Colorado Classic (cycling), stage races for men and women started in 2017; men's race (formerly part of the UCI America Tour) discontinued in 2018
- Colorado Classic (football), an annual college football game between Adams State University and Western Colorado University
- Colorado Classic (golf), a Nike Tour event held from 1996 to 1997
