= 1992 Ben Hogan Tour =

Golf tour season

1992 Ben Hogan Tour season
- Duration: February 14, 1992 – October 18, 1992
- Number of official events: 30
- Most wins: (United States) Brian Henninger (3) (United States) John Flannery (3)
- Money list: (United States) John Flannery
- Player of the Year: (United States) John Flannery

The 1992 Ben Hogan Tour was the third season of the Ben Hogan Tour, the official development tour to the PGA Tour.

== Schedule ==
The following table lists official events during the 1992 season.

Date	Tournament	Location	Purse (US$)	Winner (Note: The number in parentheses after each winner's name is the number of Ben Hogan Tour events they had won up to and including that tournament. This information is only shown for Ben Hogan Tour members. It is rare for someone to accumulate many wins on the Ben Hogan Tour as success at this level usually leads to promotion to the PGA Tour.)	Notes
Feb 16	Ben Hogan Yuma Open	Arizona	125,000	(United States) Paul Goydos (1)	
Mar 1	Ben Hogan South Texas Open	Texas	125,000	(United States) Brian Henninger (1)	
Mar 8	Ben Hogan Louisiana Open	Louisiana	125,000	(United States) Sean Murphy (1)	New tournament
Mar 15	Ben Hogan Lake City Classic	Florida	125,000	(United States) Tim Loustalot (1)	
Mar 22	Ben Hogan Panama City Beach Classic	Florida	125,000	(United States) Brian Kamm (1)	
Mar 29	Ben Hogan Gulf Coast Classic	Mississippi	125,000	(Canada) Glen Hnatiuk (1)	
Apr 5	Ben Hogan Pensacola Open	Florida	125,000	(United States) Rick Dalpos (2)	
Apr 19	Ben Hogan Shreveport Open	Louisiana	150,000	(United States) Ted Tryba (3)	
Apr 26	Ben Hogan Macon Open	Georgia	125,000	(United States) Brian Henninger (2)	
May 3	Ben Hogan South Carolina Classic	South Carolina	150,000	(United States) John Flannery (2)	
May 10	Ben Hogan Greater Greenville Classic	South Carolina	150,000	(United States) Russell Beiersdorf (2)	New tournament
May 17	Ben Hogan Knoxville Open	Tennessee	150,000	(United States) Brian Henninger (3)	
Jun 7	Ben Hogan Quicksilver Open	Pennsylvania	250,000	(United States) John Flannery (3)	
Jun 14	Ben Hogan Cleveland Open	Ohio	250,000	(United States) David Jackson (1)	
Jun 21	Ben Hogan Connecticut Open	Connecticut	125,000	(United States) Jon Christian (1)	
Jun 28	Ben Hogan New England Classic	Maine	125,000	(United States) Greg Bruckner (1)	
Jul 12	Ben Hogan Fort Wayne Open	Indiana	125,000	(United States) Russell Beiersdorf (3)	
Jul 19	Ben Hogan Dakota Dunes Open	South Dakota	150,000	(Canada) Rick Todd (2)	
Jul 26	Ben Hogan Hawkeye Open	Iowa	125,000	(United States) John Dowdall (1)	
Aug 2	Ben Hogan Greater Ozarks Open	Missouri	150,000	(United States) Lennie Clements (1)	
Aug 9	Ben Hogan Wichita Charity Classic	Kansas	125,000	(Australia) Jeff Woodland (2)	
Aug 16	Ben Hogan Texarkana Open	Arkansas	150,000	(United States) Perry Moss (1)	
Aug 23	Ben Hogan Tulsa Open	Oklahoma	150,000	(United States) Steve Lowery (1)	
Aug 30	Ben Hogan Permian Basin Open	Texas	150,000	(United States) Taylor Smith (1)	New tournament
Sep 13	Ben Hogan Tri-Cities Open	Washington	125,000	(United States) Rick Pearson (2)	
Sep 20	Ben Hogan Boise Open	Idaho	150,000	(United States) Jaime Gomez (1)	
Sep 27	Ben Hogan Utah Classic	Utah	125,000	(Australia) Jeff Woodland (3)	
Oct 4	Ben Hogan Sonoma County Open	California	125,000	(United States) John Flannery (4)	
Oct 11	Ben Hogan Bakersfield Open	California	150,000	(United States) Tom Garner (2)	
Oct 18	Ben Hogan Fresno Open	California	150,000	(United States) Mike Springer (4)	New tournament

== Money list ==
The money list was based on prize money won during the season, calculated in U.S. dollars. The top 10 players on the money list earned status to play on the 1993 PGA Tour.

Position	Player	Prize money ($)
1	(United States) John Flannery	164,115
2	(United States) Brian Henninger	128,301
3	(United States) Steve Lowery	114,553
4	(United States) Ted Tryba	105,952
5	(United States) David Jackson	104,222

== Awards ==
Award	Winner	Ref.
Player of the Year (Jack Nicklaus Trophy)	(United States) John Flannery	
