= Matt McQuillan =

Canadian professional golfer (1981–2026)

Personal information
- Full name: Matthew Justin McQuillan
- Nationality: Canada
- Born: 19 June 1981 Kingston, Ontario, Canada
- Died: 5 August 2026 (aged 45) Kingston, Ontario, Canada
- Height: 5 ft 11 in (1.80 m)
- Weight: 160 lb (73 kg; 11 st)

Career
- Sport: Golf
- College: Oklahoma State University; University of Georgia
- Turned professional: 2003
- Former tours: PGA Tour; PGA Tour Canada
- Professional wins: 2

Matthew Justin McQuillan (19 June 1981 – 5 August 2026) was a Canadian professional golfer. He played on the Canadian Tour from 2003 to 2019, and won one tournament there. McQuillan earned 2011 playing privileges on the PGA Tour with a strong performance in stage three of Q-School, on his first attempt at the finals. His best career PGA Tour finish was a tie for third in the 2011 John Deere Classic.

== Early life ==
McQuillan was born in Kingston, Ontario. His father Mark and mother Donna are members at the Garrison Golf and Curling Club in Kingston, and introduced Matt to golf there in 1991. His father is a single-figure handicap player, and coached him for a few years. He received instruction at Garrison first in the club's junior program from pro shop manager John Holland, and then privately from assistant professional Kevin Dickey (a former Canadian Tour player).

McQuillan won the Garrison Men's Open and the Garrison Men's Club Championship in 1996 at age 15, becoming the youngest-ever winner of both events. He won the Club Championship again in 1998 (by 11 shots) and 1999 (by 20 shots, with a record score of 278, ten under par). He eventually won the Garrison Open half-a-dozen times. In 2002 he set the competitive course record at Garrison with a score of 9-under-par 63.

As McQuillan continued to improve, he earned success at higher levels, including victories in the 1999 Ontario Junior Championship at the Dalewood Golf Club in Port Hope, and in the 1999 Ontario Junior Match Play Championship. He claimed second place at the 1999 Canadian Junior Championship at the Maple City Golf Club in Chatham, Ontario. He was selected as Kingston's Amateur Athlete of the Year for 1999.

He represented Canada for the first time at the 2000 World Junior Team event in Japan, finishing as third individual scorer.

== Amateur career ==
McQuillan graduated from La Salle Secondary School in Kingston, and earned a golf scholarship to Oklahoma State University, beginning in the fall of 2000, where he played for coach Mike Holder. McQuillan later transferred to the University of Georgia, but left college before completing his degree.

He placed second in the 2000 Ontario Men's Amateur Championship at the National Golf Club of Canada in Woodbridge, Ontario, earning a place on the four-player Ontario Willingdon Cup team. McQuillan represented Canada on the 2001 Four Nations' Cup team, which emerged victorious over teams from Australia, New Zealand, and Japan; this event was held at the Lambton Golf Club in Toronto. The six Canadian team members also included David Hearn, Jon Mills, and Lee Curry. McQuillan advanced to the semi-finals of the 2001 Canadian Amateur Championship, finally ending his tournament run with a loss to heralded amateur Graham Cooke. In 2002, McQuillan was the top-ranked player in Ontario entering the Ontario Amateur, but had to withdraw, suffering from mononucleosis.

== Professional career ==
McQuillan turned professional, and finished 7th at the 2003 Spring qualifying tournament for the Canadian Tour. His most successful Canadian Tour result to date has been a victory at the 2005 Telus Edmonton Open, scoring 13-under-par 271 at the Edmonton Golf & Country Club, from 30 June to 3 July; McQuillan edged the runner-up, promising amateur Graham DeLaet, and won $24,000 (Canadian funds). McQuillan played in three Nationwide Tour events in 2005, with his best finish a tie for 25th position in the Alberta Classic.

He finished runner-up at the 2006 Canadian Tour Championship. For a time in the mid-2000s, he represented the Cataraqui Golf and Country Club in Kingston, but no longer does so. However, he still works with Dickey, now a teacher at Cataraqui. McQuillan received an honorary membership from Cataraqui on 21 December 2010, after he earned PGA Tour playing privileges for 2011.

McQuillan successfully played on the Tar Heels Tour in the Carolinas during the spring of 2008, in preparation for a return to PGA Tour qualifying in the fall of 2008. He set a new competitive course record at Cataraqui in mid-July 2008, winning the Cataraqui Pro-Am tournament, with a score of 62, 8-under-par, breaking the previous mark by one stroke. McQuillan played on the EGolf Professional Tour with success early in 2010, and played well at the Seaforth Country Classic on the Canadian Tour in August 2010, finishing in 4th place. He retains exempt status on the Canadian Tour for 2011. McQuillan worked as a bartender in Kingston to supplement his income between stints on pro golf tours.

=== PGA Tour ===
McQuillan entered PGA Tour qualifying in the fall of 2010, beginning at first stage. He scored 67 in the final round at first stage to advance. He then advanced to the third and final stage of 2010 PGA Tour qualifying, by placing third at the second stage qualifying event, hosted by the Bear Creek Golf Club in Murrieta, California. McQuillan successfully gained PGA Tour status for the 2011 season, by finishing T16 at 11-under-par after six rounds, at final stage, hosted by the Orange County National facility near Orlando, Florida. This was his first trip to the finals.

He made his 2011 debut at the Sony Open in Hawaii in Honolulu, the first PGA Tour event of his career. He survived the 36-hole cut with rounds of 68–69, then finishing on the 36-hole final day (caused by a rainout on the scheduled first round day) with 71-74 for 282 and 55th place, winning $12,705. McQuillan earned last-minute entry to the Bob Hope Classic in Palm Springs, shot a first-round 7-under-par 65 which included seven birdies and an eagle, but followed up with rounds of 76-73-77 to miss the fourth-round cut with a score of 3-over-par 291. At the Farmers Insurance Open in San Diego, McQuillan struggled with rounds of 74–77 to miss the halfway cut with a score of 7-over-par 151. McQuillan scored 76-76-68 for 6-over-par 220 in the AT&T National Pro-Am, missing the 54-hole cut. McQuillan shot rounds of 76–73 at the Mayakoba Golf Classic near Cancun, Mexico, missing the 36-hole cut. McQuillan scored 71–74 at the 2011 Puerto Rico Open, held just east of San Juan, Puerto Rico, to miss the 36-hole cut by one stroke.

After playing on the PGA Tour for ten weeks in 2011, making just one cut in six events, McQuillan said the course setups he had been facing were much tougher than anything he had seen before, but added that he was settling into life on the Tour, and anticipated an improvement in his performance as he gained experience. McQuillan dropped down to the Nationwide Tour for his next event, the Louisiana Classic. After opening with 70–66 to move into contention, he struggled on the weekend with rounds of 76 and 73 to finish at one-over-par 285, tied for 62nd place, earning $1,463. McQuillan's struggles continued at the Valero Texas Open, where he missed the 36-hole cut after rounds of 82–75. McQuillan shot 78–77 at the Zurich Classic of New Orleans to miss the cut by 12 strokes. McQuillan played the Nationwide Tour's Stadion Classic at UGA on his former home course in Athens, Georgia, but missed the 36-hole cut by three strokes with scores of 71–76. His next event was the HP Byron Nelson Championship near Dallas, where his scores of 73-73 missed the 36-hole cut by three strokes. McQuillan played the Nationwide Tour's Maryland event, the Melwood Prince George's County Open, and missed the cut by two shots with scores of 72–71. He shot 70–73 to miss the 36-hole cut by one stroke at the FedEx St. Jude Classic near Memphis. Although he missed another cut, by four strokes, at the Travelers Championship near Hartford with scores of 73–67, his second round was his first under 70 on the PGA Tour since Pebble Beach, four months before.

McQuillan broke out of his slump at the John Deere Classic, in Silvis, Illinois. He opened with 64 to tie for second place, one stroke out of the lead. He made the halfway cut comfortably with a second-round 69, then played well on the weekend with rounds of 70–64, finishing with 17-under-par 267, to tie for third place, winning $261,000. His three eagles led the field. His position on the Official World Golf Ranking jumped to #506. McQuillan continued his good play at the Viking Classic, near Jackson, Mississippi, where he scored 72-65-71-67, for 13-under-par 275, to tie for 34th place, winning $18,990. McQuillan made his third straight cut at the RBC Canadian Open, held over the Shaughnessy Golf & Country Club in Vancouver, scoring 68-73-74-70 for 5-over-par 285, tied for 31st place, and winning $33,800. McQuillan saw his streak of three straight made cuts end at the 2011 Greenbrier Classic, where his scores of 71-74 missed the 36-hole cut by four strokes. McQuillan tied for sixth place at the 2011 Reno-Tahoe Open with scores of 71-69-71-66 for a 277 total, 11-under-par, winning $97,125. McQuillan's scores of 69–70 at the Wyndham Championship missed the halfway cut by two strokes, and he failed to make the top 125-point scorers for the FedEx Cup, missing the four playoff events. McQuillan made seven cuts in 21 events and ended the season 137th on the money list.

In 2017, McQuillan qualified for the PGA Tour Canada.

McQuillan died on 5 August 2026, at the age of 45.

== Professional wins (2) ==
=== Canadian Tour wins (1) ===
No.	Date	Tournament	Winning score	Margin of victory	Runner-up
1	3 Jul 2005	Telus Edmonton Open	−17 (67-68-66-66=267)	6 strokes	(Canada) Graham DeLaet (a)

=== Other wins (1) ===
- 2008 Cataraqui Pro-Am

== See also ==
- 2010 PGA Tour Qualifying School graduates
