= Frank Conner (golfer) =

American golfer and tennis player (born 1946)

Personal information
- Nationality: United States
- Born: January 11, 1946 (age 80) Vienna, Austria
- Height: 5 ft 9 in (1.75 m)
- Weight: 195 lb (88 kg; 13.9 st)

Career
- Sport: Golf
- College: Trinity University
- Turned professional: 1971
- Former tours: PGA Tour; Champions Tour
- Professional wins: 7

Number of wins by tour
- Korn Ferry Tour: 2
- Other: 5

Best results in major championships
- Masters Tournament: CUT: 1982
- PGA Championship: T23: 1979
- U.S. Open: T6: 1981
- The Open Championship: CUT: 1971

Frank Conner (born January 11, 1946) is an American professional golfer who played on the PGA Tour, Nationwide Tour, and Champions Tour. He was also an accomplished amateur tennis player. He, Ellsworth Vines and G. H. "Pete" Bostwick Jr. are the only men to play in the U.S. Open in both tennis and golf.

== Early life and amateur career ==
Conner was born in Vienna, Austria, where his father was stationed with the U.S. Army. He competed in the U.S. Open in tennis in 1965, 1966, and 1967. He attended Trinity University in San Antonio, Texas, graduating in 1970 with a degree in Business Administration. While at Trinity he was an All-American in tennis in 1968.

== Professional career ==
Conner gave up playing tennis and turned to golf, turning professional in 1971. He failed four times at qualifying school before finally getting his tour card at 1974 PGA Tour Qualifying School. He played on the PGA Tour from 1975 to 1989 and again in 1992. He finished second four times: in 1979 to Hubert Green at the First NBC New Orleans Open, in 1981 to Dave Barr in a five-man playoff at the Quad Cities Open, in 1982 to Tom Watson in a playoff at the Sea Pines Heritage, and in 1984 to George Archer at the Bank of Boston Classic. He won the 1988 Deposit Guaranty Golf Classic which was played opposite the Masters Tournament - it was an official money event but not an official win on the PGA Tour. His best finish in a major championship was a T-6 at the 1981 U.S. Open.

Conner played on the PGA Tour's developmental tour from 1990–91 and 1993-95. He won twice in 1991 at the Ben Hogan Knoxville Open and the Ben Hogan Tulsa Open and finished fifth on the money list to regain his PGA Tour card.

After turning 50 in 1996, Conner played on the Senior PGA Tour from 1996 to 2002. His best finishes on this tour were a pair of second places: at the 1997 The Transamerica and the 1998 Kroger Senior Classic in a five-man playoff.

== Awards and honors ==
In 2001, Conner was elected to Trinity University Hall of Fame

== Professional wins (7) ==
=== Ben Hogan Tour wins (2) ===
No.	Date	Tournament	Winning score	Margin of victory	Runner(s)-up
1	May 19, 1991	Ben Hogan Knoxville Open	−15 (63-68-67=198)	1 stroke	(United States) Perry Arthur, (United States) Paul Goydos
2	Aug 11, 1991	Ben Hogan Tulsa Open	−6 (75-68-67=210)	Playoff	(United States) Tom Lehman

Ben Hogan Tour playoff record (1–0)

No.	Year	Tournament	Opponent	Result
1	1991	Ben Hogan Tulsa Open	(United States) Tom Lehman	Won with birdie on second extra hole

=== Other wins (5) ===
- 1978 Southern Texas PGA Championship
- 1982 King Hassan Open, Southern Texas PGA Championship
- 1983 Texas State Open
- 1988 Deposit Guaranty Golf Classic (unofficial PGA Tour win)

== Playoff record ==
PGA Tour playoff record (0–2)

No.	Year	Tournament	Opponent(s)	Result
1	1981	Quad Cities Open	(Canada) Dave Barr, (United States) Woody Blackburn, (Canada) Dan Halldorson, (Mexico) Victor Regalado	Barr won with par on eighth extra hole Conner, Halldorson and Regalado eliminated by birdie on first hole
2	1982	Sea Pines Heritage Classic	(United States) Tom Watson	Lost to par on third extra hole

Champions Tour playoff record (0–1)

No.	Year	Tournament	Opponents	Result
1	1998	Kroger Senior Classic	(South Africa) Hugh Baiocchi, (New Zealand) Bob Charles, (United States) Larry Nelson, (United States) Bruce Summerhays	Baiocchi won with birdie on second extra hole

== Results in major championships ==
Tournament	1971	1972	1973	1974	1975	1976	1977	1978	1979
Masters Tournament									
U.S. Open			CUT		T58				T48
The Open Championship	CUT								
PGA Championship									T23

Tournament	1980	1981	1982	1983	1984	1985	1986	1987
Masters Tournament			CUT					
U.S. Open	CUT	T6	CUT	T50		T46	T59	CUT
The Open Championship								
PGA Championship	CUT	WD	CUT			T40		

Top 10
Did not play

CUT = missed the halfway cut
WD = withdrew
"T" = tied

== See also ==
- 1974 PGA Tour Qualifying School graduates
- 1991 Ben Hogan Tour graduates
