= Dakota Dunes Open =

Buy.com Siouxland Open
Tournament information
- Location: Dakota Dunes, South Dakota
- Established: 1990
- Course: Dakota Dunes Country Club
- Par: 72
- Tour: Buy.com Tour
- Format: Stroke play
- Prize fund: US$425,000
- Month played: July
- Final year: 2001

Tournament record score
- Aggregate: 268 Chris Smith (1997)
- To par: −20 as above

Final champion
- (United States) Pat Bates
- Location in the United States Location in South Dakota

The Dakota Dunes Open was a golf tournament on the Buy.com Tour. It was inaugurated in 1990 as one of the founding tournaments on the tour, then known as the Ben Hogan Tour, and ran until 2001. It was played in Sioux City, Iowa for the first three years before moving to the Dakota Dunes Country Club in Dakota Dunes, South Dakota in 1993, where it stayed for the remainder of its existence.

In 2001 the winner received $76,500.

== Winners ==
Year	Winner	Score	To par	Margin of victory	Runner(s)-up
Buy.com Siouxland Open
2001	(United States) Pat Bates	273	−15	1 stroke	(United States) Matt Kuchar (United States) Eric Meeks
Buy.com Dakota Dunes Open
2000	(United States) Spike McRoy	270	−18	1 stroke	(United States) Mike Schuchart
Nike Dakota Dunes Open
1999	(United States) Fran Quinn	270	−18	Playoff	(United States) Ryan Howison (United States) Craig Kanada
1998	(United States) John Maginnes	274	−14	Playoff	(United States) Ryan Howison (United States) Sean Murphy
1997	(United States) Chris Smith (2)	268	−20	2 strokes	(Canada) Glen Hnatiuk
1996	(United States) Gary Webb	275	−13	Playoff	(United States) Chad Magee
1995	(United States) Chris Smith	272	−16	1 stroke	(United States) Greg Hamilton (United States) Clarence Rose
1994	(United States) Pat Bates	276	−12	2 strokes	(United States) Rex Caldwell (United States) Gary Webb
1993	(United States) Alan Pate	260 (Note: Unofficial scoring record due to each round being shortened to 17 holes (par 69) because of flooding.)	−16	1 stroke	(United States) Stan Utley
Ben Hogan Dakota Dunes Open
1992	(Canada) Rick Todd	207	−9	Playoff	(United States) David Jackson
1991	(Australia) Jeff Woodland	196	−20	1 stroke	(Trinidad and Tobago) Stephen Ames (United States) Kel Devlin (United States) Kelly Gibson
1990	(United States) Kim Young	197	−19	1 stroke	(United States) Mike Springer (United States) Steve Stricker

== Multiple winners ==
- 2 wins: Pat Bates, Chris Smith
