= 2005 Canadian Tour =

Golf tour season

2005 Canadian Tour season
- Duration: March 12, 2005 – September 18, 2005
- Number of official events: 12
- Most wins: (United States) Michael Harris (2)
- Order of Merit: (United States) Michael Harris

The 2005 Canadian Tour was the 20th season of the Canadian Tour, the main professional golf tour in Canada since it was formed in 1986.

== Schedule ==
The following table lists official events during the 2005 season.

Date	Tournament	Location	Purse (C$)	Winner (Note: The number in parentheses after each winner's name is the number of Canadian Tour events they had won up to and including that tournament.)	OWGR points
Mar 15	Barton Creek Austin Pro-Am Classic	United States	US$100,000	(United States) Scott Gibson (1)	6
Mar 20	Barton Creek Austin Challenge	United States	US$100,000	(United States) Omar Uresti (1)	6
Apr 17	Northern California Classic	United States	US$100,000	(United States) Jim Seki (1)	6
Apr 24	Foster Farms California Classic	United States	US$100,000	(Canada) Stuart Anderson (1)	6
May 8	Corona Mazatlán Classic	Mexico	US$125,000	(United States) Jaime Gomez (2)	6
May 14	Michelin Morelia Classic	Mexico	US$125,000	(United States) David Mathis (1)	6
Jun 19	Times Colonist Open	British Columbia	150,000	(Canada) Craig Taylor (1)	6
Jul 3	Telus Edmonton Open	Alberta	150,000	(Canada) Matt McQuillan (1)	6
Jul 10	MTS Classic	Manitoba	150,000	(United States) Lee Williamson (1)	6
Aug 7	Lexus Montreal Open	Quebec	150,000	(United States) Peter Tomasulo (1)	6
Aug 28	Bay Mills Open Players Championship	United States	US$200,000	(United States) Michael Harris (1)	6
Sep 18	Niagara Fallsview Casino Resort Pro-Am Classic	Ontario	100,000	(United States) Michael Harris (2)	6

== Order of Merit ==
The Order of Merit was based on prize money won during the season, calculated in Canadian dollars.

Position	Player	Prize money (C$)
1	(United States) Michael Harris	95,622
2	(United States) Jaime Gomez	78,520
3	(United States) Peter Tomasulo	70,485
4	(United States) David Mathis	56,925
5	(Canada) Stuart Anderson	46,247
