= 1995–96 Asia Golf Circuit =

Golf tour season

1995–96 Asia Golf Circuit season
- Duration: 12 October 1995 – 21 April 1996
- Number of official events: 13 (Note: A further four tournaments were scheduled but were removed from the schedule.)
- Order of Merit: (Canada) Rick Todd

The 1995–96 Asia Golf Circuit was the 35th season of the Asia Golf Circuit (formerly the Far East Circuit), one of the main professional golf tours in Asia (outside of Japan) alongside the Asian PGA Tour.

== Schedule ==
The following table lists official events during the 1995–96 season.

Date	Tournament	Host country	Purse (US$)	Winner (Note: The number in brackets after each winner's name is the number of Asia Golf Circuit events they had won up to and including that tournament. This information is only shown for Asia Golf Circuit members.)	OWGR points	Other tours (Note: JPN − PGA of Japan Tour; KOR − Korean Tour.)	Notes
15 Oct	Volvo Asian Masters	Taiwan	400,000	(United States) Corey Pavin (n/a)	16		New tournament
19 Nov	Hong Kong Open	Hong Kong	300,000	(United States) Gary Webb (2)	16		
25 Nov	Tugu Pratama Indonesian PGA Championship	Indonesia	250,000	(Australia) John Senden (n/a)	14		New to Asia Golf Circuit
21 Jan	Benson & Hedges Malaysian Open	Malaysia	300,000	(United States) Steve Flesch (1)	16		
~~28 Jan~~	Sabah Masters	Malaysia	–	Removed (Note: Proceeded as an Asian PGA Tour event.)	–		
4 Feb	Mitsubishi Motors Southwoods Open	Philippines	250,000	(Italy) Manny Zerman (1)	12		New tournament
11 Feb	Thai Airways Thailand Open	Thailand	300,000	(United States) Todd Barranger (1)	12		
18 Feb	Classic Indian Open	India	300,000	(Japan) Hidezumi Shirakata (1)	12		
~~25 Feb~~	Thai Classic	Thailand	–	Removed	–		New tournament
~~3 Mar~~	Malaysian Classic	Malaysia	–	Removed	–		New tournament
9 Mar	Matoa Nasional Invitational	Indonesia	250,000	(United States) Christian Peña (1)	12		
17 Mar	Indonesia Open	Indonesia	250,000	(England) Ed Fryatt (1)	12		
24 Mar	Rolex Masters	Singapore	250,000	(United States) Mike Cunning (1)	12		
31 Mar	U-Bix Philippine Open	Philippines	300,000	(Australia) Rob Whitlock (1)	12		
~~7 Apr~~	China Classic	China	–	Removed	–		New tournament
14 Apr	Maekyung LG Fashion Open	South Korea	300,000	(South Korea) Park Nam-sin (2)	12	KOR	
21 Apr	Kirin Open	Japan	¥100,000,000	(Japan) Yoshinori Kaneko (n/a)	16	JPN	

== Order of Merit ==
The Order of Merit was based on prize money won during the season, calculated in U.S. dollars. The leading player on the Order of Merit earned status to play on the 1996 PGA of Japan Tour.

Position	Player	Prize money ($)
1	(Canada) Rick Todd	110,122
2	(England) Ed Fryatt	81,921
3	(Canada) Jim Rutledge	72,830
4	(United States) Rob Moss	72,608
5	(United States) Don Walsworth	71,734

== See also ==
- 1995 Asian PGA Tour
- 1996 Asian PGA Tour
