= Alan Shipnuck =

American sportswriter

Alan Shipnuck (1973) is an American sportswriter, specializing in golf. He is a Writer at Large at Skratch Golf. Previously, he was a senior writer at Sports Illustrated and Golf Magazine.

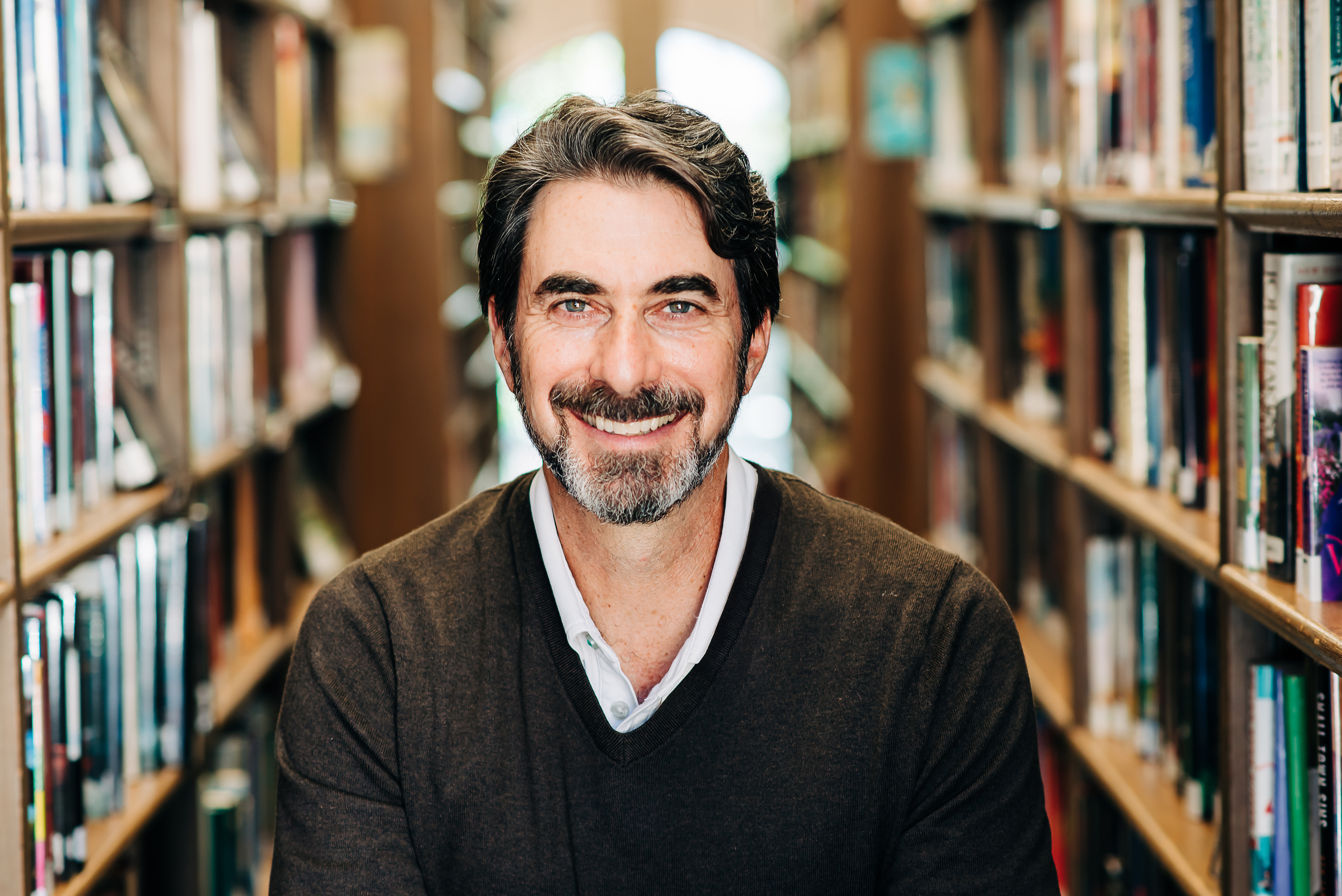
Alan Shipnuck in 2025

== Early life and education ==
Shipnuck is a native of Salinas northeast of Monterey in central California. His father David Shipnuck was an economics professor at Hartnell College in Salinas. His late mother Barbara Shipnuck was the first woman elected to the Monterey County Board of Supervisors, serving four terms. He grew up playing sports and reading about sports; he combined the passions becoming the editor of his junior high newspaper and the Salinas High School yearbook, while spending his summers working as a "cart boy" at the renowned Pebble Beach Golf Links in Pebble Beach, California. When he was a junior in high school, he answered an ad in The Salinas Californian under the headline "Sportswriters Wanted," beginning his journalism career with the newspaper.

== Journalism career ==
While an undergrad at UCLA in Los Angeles, Shipnuck maintained a two-year correspondence with Mark Mulvoy, the managing editor of SI whom he had met on the first tee at Pebble Beach. That led to an internship beginning in January 1994, when Shipnuck took a leave of absence from UCLA to work out of SI's headquarters in Manhattan, New York writing for the nascent Golf Plus section, providing supplemental coverage of the sport to subscribers. Shipnuck earned numerous bylines during his internship, culminating with a cover story on Ken Griffey, Jr. in the August 8, 1994 issue. After returning to UCLA to earn his communications degree, Shipnuck was hired in April 1996 as the youngest staff writer in Sports Illustrated's history.

Shipnuck covered more than 70 of golf's major championships for SI and wrote two dozen cover stories on subjects including Sportsman of the Year pieces on Brett Favre and Michael Phelps. His 7,000 word feature about Donald Trump made international news when it revealed the president had referred to the White House as being a "dump."

In April 2018, Shipnuck left SI to join Golf Magazine. In 2021, he won his 12th first-place citation in the annual awards contest conducted by the Golf Writers Association of America, breaking the record held by Dan Jenkins, a member of the World Golf Hall of Fame. In March 2021, Shipnuck left Golf Magazine to serve as partner and executive editor at a new media company, the Fire Pit Collective. He joined Skratch Golf in the summer of 2025 and is now a Writer at Large. In 2026, he extended his record with a 14th first-place citation in the Golf Writers Association of America annual writing awards competition.

== Books ==
In 2001, Shipnuck's first book, Bud, Sweat & Tees, was published by Simon & Schuster of Manhattan. It became a national best-seller in 2002 after the protagonist, Rich Beem, won the PGA Championship in Chaska, Minnesota. The Battle For Augusta National was published in 2004. It is a revisionist club history of the home of the Masters and chronicles the controversy around its then all-male membership; Publishers Weekly hailed it for "superbly recounting all of the debacle's hilarious, sad, serious and absurd details."

Swinging From My Heels: Confessions of an LPGA Star (2010) is a diary of Christina Kim's triumphs and tribulations on the LPGA Tour. Shipnuck co-wrote the novel The Swinger with his friend Michael Bamberger. A national best-seller in 2011, it goes inside the world of a cross-cultural golf superstar whose life is torn asunder by scandal; there is some resemblance to the life and times of Tiger Woods.

In 2017, Shipnuck's coffee table book, Monterey Peninsula Country Club: A Complete History, was published. In 2018, he co-wrote with Harriet Diamond her memoir The Best Is Yet To Come. PHIL: The Rip-Roaring (and Unauthorized!) Biography of Golf's Most Colorful Superstar was published by Avid Reader Press/Simon & Schuster in May 2022. In February 2022, an excerpt from Phil appeared on FirePitCollective.com, containing Mickelson's provocative statements about Saudi Arabia and the PGA Tour. In the ensuing controversy, three corporate sponsors ended their affiliation with Mickelson; he announced he would be taking time off to "prioritize the ones I love most and work on being the man I want to be." Shipnuck followed in 2023 with LIV and Let Die: The Inside Story of the War Between the PGA Tour and LIV Golf. His tenth book was published in 2026: Rory: The Heartbreak and Triumph of Golf's Most Human Superstar. Rory was a New York Times bestseller, as PHIL had been.

== Personal ==
Shipnuck is a member of the 2022 class of the Salinas Valley Sports Hall of Fame. He lives in Carmel, California and is the head coach of the girls basketball team at Carmel High School in the city.
