= Duffy Waldorf =

American professional golfer (born 1962)

Personal information
- Full name: James Joseph Waldorf Jr.
- Nickname: Duffy
- Nationality: United States
- Born: August 20, 1962 (age 64) Los Angeles, California, U.S.
- Height: 6 ft 0 in (1.83 m)
- Weight: 225 lb (102 kg; 16.1 st)

Career
- Sport: Golf
- College: University of California, Los Angeles
- Turned professional: 1985
- Current tour: PGA Tour Champions
- Former tour: PGA Tour
- Professional wins: 10
- Highest ranking: 35 (November 12, 2000)

Number of wins by tour
- PGA Tour: 4
- PGA Tour Champions: 2
- Other: 4

Best results in major championships
- Masters Tournament: T5: 1996
- PGA Championship: T9: 1992
- U.S. Open: T9: 1994
- The Open Championship: T18: 2002

James Joseph "Duffy" Waldorf Jr. (born August 20, 1962) is an American professional golfer who plays on the PGA Tour Champions. He was previously a member of the PGA Tour, where he won four times.

== Early life and amateur career ==
Waldorf was born in Los Angeles, California. He attended UCLA where he was on the golf team from 1982 to 1985. He was a two-time NCAA All-American, 1985 College Player of the Year, and was selected for the 1985 Walker Cup.

== Professional career ==
In 1985, Waldorf turned professional and joined the PGA Tour.

Waldorf's career PGA Tour earnings are over $11.9 million. He has featured in the top 50 of the Official World Golf Rankings, peaking at 35th in 2000.

Waldorf finished T-14 in the 2007 Q-School to regain his 2008 PGA Tour card. However, after playing in only 4 events, he underwent knee surgery in May 2008. A recurring knee problem hindered Waldorf, who sat out the entire 2009 and 2010 seasons. He played in 14 events during the 2011 season. He failed to satisfy his Medical Extension and split the 2012 season among the PGA Tour, Nationwide Tour, and Champions Tour.

== Amateur wins ==
- 1984 California State Amateur, Broadmoor Invitational
- 1985 Pac-10 Individual Champion, Rice Planters Amateur

== Professional wins (10) ==
=== PGA Tour wins (4) ===
No.	Date	Tournament	Winning score	Margin of victory	Runner-up
1	Oct 22, 1995	LaCantera Texas Open	−20 (66-66-71-65=268)	6 strokes	(United States) Justin Leonard
2	Jun 27, 1999	Buick Classic	−8 (70-67-68-71=276)	Playoff	(United States) Dennis Paulson
3	Sep 26, 1999	Westin Texas Open	−18 (68-69-65-68=270)	Playoff	(United States) Ted Tryba
4	Oct 29, 2000	National Car Rental Golf Classic Disney	−26 (65-66-69-62=262)	1 stroke	(United States) Steve Flesch

PGA Tour playoff record (2–1)

No.	Year	Tournament	Opponent(s)	Result
1	1997	Michelob Championship at Kingsmill	(United States) David Duval, (New Zealand) Grant Waite	Duval won with birdie on first extra hole
2	1999	Buick Classic	(United States) Dennis Paulson	Won with birdie on first extra hole
3	1999	Westin Texas Open	(United States) Ted Tryba	Won with birdie on first extra hole

=== Other wins (4) ===
No.	Date	Tournament	Winning score	Margin of victory	Runner-up
1	Dec 10, 1995	Diners Club Matches (with (United States) Tom Lehman)	1 up		(United States) John Huston and (United States) Kenny Perry
2	Dec 15, 1996	Diners Club Matches (2) (with (United States) Tom Lehman)	2 and 1		(United States) Scott Hoch and (United States) Kenny Perry
3	Dec 17, 2000	Hyundai Team Matches (3) (with (United States) Tom Lehman)	20 holes		(United States) Mark Calcavecchia and (United States) Fred Couples
4	Nov 19, 2017	TaylorMade Pebble Beach Invitational	−7 (281)	1 stroke	(United States) Sam Burns, (United States) Tom Pernice Jr., (United States) Kevin Sutherland

Other playoff record (0–1)

No.	Year	Tournament	Opponents	Result
1	1989	JCPenney Classic (with (United States) Patty Sheehan)	(United States) Pat Bradley and (United States) Bill Glasson	Lost to eagle on fourth extra hole

=== PGA Tour Champions wins (2) ===
No.	Date	Tournament	Winning score	Margin of victory	Runner-up
1	Nov 1, 2015	Toshiba Classic	−20 (67-60-66=193)	2 strokes	(United States) Joe Durant
2	Jan 23, 2016	Mitsubishi Electric Championship at Hualalai	−18 (67-65-66=198)	1 stroke	(United States) Tom Lehman

PGA Tour Champions playoff record (0–1)

No.	Year	Tournament	Opponent	Result
1	2014	Allianz Championship	(United States) Michael Allen	Lost to birdie on second extra hole

== Results in major championships ==
Tournament	1987	1988	1989
Masters Tournament			
U.S. Open	T58	CUT	CUT
The Open Championship			
PGA Championship			

Tournament	1990	1991	1992	1993	1994	1995	1996	1997	1998	1999
Masters Tournament				T39		T24	T5	36		
U.S. Open			T57	T72	T9	T13	CUT	T60		
The Open Championship			T25	T39						T43
PGA Championship			T9	CUT		T20	CUT	CUT	T38	T41

Tournament	2000	2001	2002	2003	2004	2005	2006	2007
Masters Tournament	CUT	T31						
U.S. Open	CUT	T44			CUT		CUT	
The Open Championship		T54	T18	T34		T67		CUT
PGA Championship	T46	CUT	CUT	T45	T49			

Top 10
Did not play

CUT = missed the half-way cut
"T" = tied

=== Summary ===
Tournament	Wins	2nd	3rd	Top-5	Top-10	Top-25	Events	Cuts made
Masters Tournament	0	0	0	1	1	2	6	5
U.S. Open	0	0	0	0	1	2	13	7
The Open Championship	0	0	0	0	0	1	8	7
PGA Championship	0	0	0	0	1	2	12	7
Totals	0	0	0	1	3	7	39	26

- Most consecutive cuts made – 6 (1992 U.S. Open – 1993 Open Championship)
- Longest streak of top-10s – 1 (three times)

== Results in The Players Championship ==
Tournament	1990	1991	1992	1993	1994	1995	1996	1997	1998	1999
The Players Championship	T61		T35	T52	CUT	CUT	CUT	T43	CUT	T17

Tournament	2000	2001	2002	2003	2004	2005
The Players Championship	CUT	CUT	CUT	T11	T74	T40

Did not play

CUT = missed the halfway cut
"T" indicates a tie for a place

== Results in World Golf Championships ==
Tournament	1999	2000	2001	2002	2003	2004
Match Play		R16	R64			R32
Championship	T40	T3	NT^{1}			
Invitational						

^{1}Cancelled due to 9/11

Top 10
Did not play

QF, R16, R32, R64 = Round in which player lost in match play
"T" = Tied
NT = No tournament

== Results in senior major championships ==
Results not in chronological order

Tournament	2013	2014	2015	2016	2017	2018	2019	2020	2021	2022	2023	2024	2025
The Tradition	T5	T46	T20	T7	T20	T5	T43	NT	T25		T57		
Senior PGA Championship	T6	T25	T26	T36	10	T23	T8	NT	T8	T33	WD	T77	CUT
Senior Players Championship	T2	T73	T34	T36	T23	T6	T24	T23	T58	T50	T53	T26	
U.S. Senior Open	T9	T20	T10	T30	T29	T31	T17	NT		CUT		CUT	CUT
Senior British Open Championship	T40		T15	T23	T31	T28		NT	T74				

Top 10
Did not play

CUT = missed the halfway cut
WD = withdrew
"T" indicates a tie for a place
NT = no tournament due to COVID-19 pandemic

== U.S. national team appearances ==
Amateur

- Walker Cup: 1985 (winners)

== See also ==
- 1986 PGA Tour Qualifying School graduates
- 1987 PGA Tour Qualifying School graduates
- 1988 PGA Tour Qualifying School graduates
- 1990 PGA Tour Qualifying School graduates
- 2007 PGA Tour Qualifying School graduates
