= 2002 PGA Championship =

Coordinates: 44.834°N 93.591°W

Tournament information
- Dates: August 15–18, 2002
- Location: Chaska, Minnesota
- Course: Hazeltine National Golf Club
- Organized by: PGA of America
- Tour(s): PGA Tour; PGA European Tour; Japan Golf Tour

Statistics
- Par: 72
- Length: 7,360 yards (6,730 m)
- Field: 156 players, 72 after cut
- Cut: 148 (+4)
- Prize fund: $5,500,000 €5,637,516
- Winner's share: $990,000 €1,019,144

Champion
- (United States) Rich Beem
- 278 (−10)

Location in the United States
Location in Minnesota

The 2002 PGA Championship was the 84th PGA Championship, held August 15–18 at Hazeltine National Golf Club in Chaska, Minnesota, a suburb southwest of Minneapolis. Rich Beem won his only major title, one stroke ahead of runner-up Tiger Woods.

This was the third major at Hazeltine; it hosted the U.S. Open in 1970 and 1991. The PGA Championship returned seven years later in 2009, also a runner-up finish for Woods.

== Course layout ==
| Hole | 1 | 2 | 3 | 4 | 5 | 6 | 7 | 8 | 9 | Out | 10 | 11 | 12 | 13 | 14 | 15 | 16 | 17 | 18 | In | Total |
|---|---|---|---|---|---|---|---|---|---|---|---|---|---|---|---|---|---|---|---|---|---|
| Yards | 460 | 435 | 636 | 196 | 412 | 405 | 542 | 178 | 436 | 3,700 | 410 | 597 | 465 | 204 | 357 | 586 | 402 | 182 | 457 | 3,660 | 7,360 |
| Par | 4 | 4 | 5 | 3 | 4 | 4 | 5 | 3 | 4 | 36 | 4 | 5 | 4 | 3 | 4 | 5 | 4 | 3 | 4 | 36 | 72 |

Lengths of the course for previous majors:

- 7,149 yards (6,537 m), par 72 - 1991 U.S. Open
- 7,151 yards (6,539 m), par 72 - 1970 U.S. Open

== Round summaries ==
=== First round ===
Thursday, August 15, 2002

| Place | Player | Score | To par |
|---|---|---|---|
| T1 | (United States) Fred Funk | 68 | −4 |
| T1 | (United States) Jim Furyk | 68 | −4 |
| T3 | (South Africa) Retief Goosen | 69 | −3 |
| T3 | (Australia) Peter Lonard | 69 | −3 |
| T3 | (England) Justin Rose | 69 | −3 |
| T6 | (United States) Mark Calcavecchia | 70 | −2 |
| T6 | (United States) Lee Janzen | 70 | −2 |
| T6 | (Germany) Bernhard Langer | 70 | −2 |
| T6 | (United States) Davis Love III | 70 | −2 |
| T6 | (United States) Jeff Sluman | 70 | −2 |

=== Second round ===
Friday, August 16, 2002

| Place | Player | Score | To par |
|---|---|---|---|
| T1 | (United States) Rich Beem | 72-66=138 | −6 |
| T1 | (United States) Mark Calcavecchia | 70-68=138 | −6 |
| T1 | (United States) Fred Funk | 68-70=138 | −6 |
| T1 | (South Africa) Retief Goosen | 69-69=138 | −6 |
| T1 | (United States) Justin Leonard | 72-66=138 | −6 |
| T6 | (Sweden) Pierre Fulke | 72-68=140 | −4 |
| T6 | (United States) Tiger Woods | 71-69=140 | −4 |
| T8 | (United States) Jim Furyk | 68-73=141 | −3 |
| T8 | (United States) Charles Howell III | 72-69=141 | −3 |
| T8 | (Germany) Bernhard Langer | 69-72=141 | −3 |
| T8 | (United States) Kenny Perry | 73-68=141 | −3 |
| T8 | (United States) Chris Riley | 71-70=141 | −3 |

=== Third round ===
Saturday, August 17, 2002

| Place | Player | Score | To par |
|---|---|---|---|
| 1 | (United States) Justin Leonard | 72-66-69=207 | −9 |
| 2 | (United States) Rich Beem | 72-66-72=210 | −6 |
| 3 | (United States) Fred Funk | 68-70-73=211 | −5 |
| T4 | (United States) Mark Calcavecchia | 70-68-74=212 | −4 |
| T4 | (United States) Tiger Woods | 71-69-72=212 | −4 |
| 6 | (United States) Chris Riley | 71-70-72=213 | −3 |
| T7 | (Argentina) José Cóceres | 72-71-72=215 | −1 |
| T7 | (United States) Steve Lowery | 71-71-73=215 | −1 |
| T7 | (United States) Rocco Mediate | 72-73-70=215 | −1 |
| T10 | (United States) Jim Furyk | 68-73-76=217 | +1 |
| T10 | (South Africa) Retief Goosen | 69-69-79=217 | +1 |
| T10 | (Australia) Peter Lonard | 69-73-75=217 | +1 |

=== Final round ===
Sunday, August 18, 2002

In a dramatic final round, Woods birdied each of the last four holes to post a 9-under clubhouse score. Beem, in the final group behind Woods, sank a 35-foot (11 m) birdie putt on the 16th hole to maintain a two-shot margin with two holes to play. After a par 3 at the 17th, Beem was on the green at the par-4 18th in two shots. With the luxury of three putts to win the title by one stroke, Beem bogeyed and celebrated. Third round leader Justin Leonard shot 77 (+5) to finish six strokes back, in a tie for fourth.

| Place | Player | Score | To par | Money ($) |
|---|---|---|---|---|
| 1 | (United States) Rich Beem | 72-66-72-68=278 | −10 | 990,000 |
| 2 | (United States) Tiger Woods | 71-69-72-67=279 | −9 | 594,000 |
| 3 | (United States) Chris Riley | 71-70-72-70=283 | −5 | 374,000 |
| T4 | (United States) Fred Funk | 68-70-73-73=284 | −4 | 235,000 |
| T4 | (United States) Justin Leonard | 72-66-69-77=284 | −4 | 235,000 |
| 6 | (United States) Rocco Mediate | 72-73-70-70=285 | −3 | 185,000 |
| 7 | (United States) Mark Calcavecchia | 70-68-74-74=286 | −2 | 172,000 |
| 8 | (Fiji) Vijay Singh | 71-74-74-68=287 | −1 | 159,000 |
| 9 | (United States) Jim Furyk | 68-73-76-71=288 | E | 149,000 |
| T10 | (Australia) Robert Allenby | 76-66-77-70=289 | +1 | 110,714 |
| T10 | (United States) Stewart Cink | 74-74-72-69=289 | +1 | 110,714 |
| T10 | (Argentina) José Cóceres | 72-71-72-74=289 | +1 | 110,714 |
| T10 | (Sweden) Pierre Fulke | 72-68-78-71=289 | +1 | 110,714 |
| T10 | (Spain) Sergio García | 75-73-73-68=289 | +1 | 110,714 |
| T10 | (Argentina) Ricardo González | 74-73-71-71=289 | +1 | 110,714 |
| T10 | (United States) Steve Lowery | 71-71-73-74=289 | +1 | 110,714 |

==== Scorecard ====
Final round

| Hole | 1 | 2 | 3 | 4 | 5 | 6 | 7 | 8 | 9 | 10 | 11 | 12 | 13 | 14 | 15 | 16 | 17 | 18 |
|---|---|---|---|---|---|---|---|---|---|---|---|---|---|---|---|---|---|---|
| Par | 4 | 4 | 5 | 3 | 4 | 4 | 5 | 3 | 4 | 4 | 5 | 4 | 3 | 4 | 5 | 4 | 3 | 4 |
| (United States) Beem | −6 | −6 | −7 | −8 | −8 | −8 | −9 | −8 | −8 | −8 | −10 | −10 | −11 | −10 | −10 | −11 | −11 | −10 |
| (United States) Woods | −4 | −4 | −4 | −5 | −5 | −6 | −7 | −7 | −7 | −7 | −7 | −7 | −6 | −5 | −6 | −7 | −8 | −9 |
| (United States) Riley | −3 | −3 | −2 | −3 | −4 | −4 | −5 | −3 | −3 | −3 | −4 | −5 | −6 | −6 | −6 | −6 | −6 | −5 |
| (United States) Funk | −5 | −5 | −6 | −6 | −5 | −5 | −5 | −4 | −5 | −5 | −6 | −6 | −6 | −5 | −5 | −5 | −5 | −4 |
| (United States) Leonard | −9 | −8 | −8 | −8 | −9 | −8 | −9 | −7 | −6 | −6 | −6 | −6 | −5 | −6 | −6 | −5 | −5 | −4 |
| (United States) Mediate | E | +1 | +1 | +1 | +1 | +1 | −1 | +1 | +1 | E | −1 | −2 | −2 | −2 | −2 | −3 | −3 | −3 |
| (United States) Calcavecchia | −4 | −3 | −3 | −3 | −4 | −3 | −3 | −3 | −2 | −2 | −3 | −3 | −3 | −3 | −3 | −3 | −3 | −2 |
| (Fiji) Singh | +2 | +2 | +1 | +1 | +2 | +2 | E | E | E | −1 | −1 | −1 | E | −1 | −2 | −1 | −1 | −1 |

Cumulative tournament scores, relative to par

| Eagle | Birdie | Bogey | Double bogey |
