= 1991 U.S. Open (golf) =

Tournament information
- Dates: June 13–17, 1991
- Location: Chaska, Minnesota; 44.834°N 93.591°W
- Course: Hazeltine National Golf Club
- Tour: PGA Tour

Statistics
- Par: 72
- Length: 7,149 yards (6,537 m)
- Field: 156 players, 65 after cut
- Cut: 147 (+3)
- Prize fund: $1.3 million
- Winner's share: $235,000

Champion
- (United States) Payne Stewart
- 282 (−6), playoff
- Location in the United States Location in Minnesota

The 1991 U.S. Open was the 91st U.S. Open, held June 13–17 at Hazeltine National Golf Club in Chaska, Minnesota, a suburb southwest of Minneapolis. Payne Stewart defeated 1987 champion Scott Simpson in an 18-hole Monday playoff to win the first of his two U.S. Open titles. It was the second of Stewart's three major championships.

Stewart held the lead through each of the first three rounds, but in the final round he found himself trailing Simpson by a stroke heading to the 18th. Simpson hit his drive into the rough and could only manage a bogey to Stewart's par, forcing an 18-hole playoff. Both players shot a final-round 72 to finish at 282 total, three shots clear of Larry Nelson and Fred Couples. In the playoff, Simpson led by two-strokes heading to the 16th. He then bogeyed the hole, however, while Stewart made birdie to even up the contest. At the par-3 17th, Simpson found the water on his tee shot and recorded another bogey, giving Stewart a one-shot advantage. Simpson then made bogey on the 18th while Stewart made a par, giving Stewart a two-stroke win and the championship. Stewart's winning score in the playoff of 75 was the highest since Tommy Armour won with a 76 in 1927.

Play was interrupted during the first round due to a severe thunderstorm. Six people were struck by lightning while seeking shelter near the 11th tee, and one person was killed.

It was the final U.S. Open appearance for two-time champion Lee Trevino; Phil Mickelson won low-amateur honors for the second consecutive year, finishing in 55th place.

This was the second U.S. Open at Hazeltine; the first was in 1970. It later hosted the PGA Championship in 2002 and 2009.

== Course layout ==
Hole	1	2	3	4	5	6	7	8	9	Out	10	11	12	13	14	15	16	17	18	In	Total
Yards	440	435	580	194	412	405	518	166	432	3,582	410	556	432	204	357	590	384	182	452	3,567	7,149
Par	4	4	5	3	4	4	5	3	4	36	4	5	4	3	4	5	4	3	4	36	72

Previous course length for major championships

- 7,151 yards (6,539 m) - par 72, 1970 U.S. Open

== Round summaries ==
=== First round ===
Thursday, June 13, 1991

Place	Player	Score	To par
T1	(United States) Nolan Henke	67	−5
T1	(United States) Payne Stewart	67	−5
3	(United States) Tom Byrum	68	−4
T4	(United States) Mark Calcavecchia	69	−3
T4	(United States) Scott Hoch	69	−3
T4	(United States) Brian Kamm	69	−3
T7	(United States) Keith Clearwater	70	−2
T7	(United States) Fred Couples	70	−2
T7	(United States) Jim Gallagher Jr.	70	−2
T7	(United States) David Jackson	70	−2
T7	(United States) Davis Love III	70	−2
T7	(United States) Jack Nicklaus	70	−2
T7	(Australia) Craig Parry	70	−2
T7	(United States) Peter Persons	70	−2
T7	(United States) Scott Simpson	70	−2

=== Second round ===
Friday, June 14, 1991

Place	Player	Score	To par
1	(United States) Payne Stewart	67-70=137	−7
T2	(United States) Nolan Henke	67-71=138	−6
T2	(United States) Corey Pavin	71-67=138	−6
T2	(United States) Scott Simpson	70-68=138	−6
T5	(United States) Fred Couples	70-70=140	−4
T5	(United States) Scott Hoch	69-71=140	−4
T5	(United States) Craig Stadler	71-69=140	−4
T8	(United States) Jodie Mudd	71-70=141	−3
T8	(Wales) Ian Woosnam	73-68=141	−3
T10	(Australia) Rodger Davis	74-68=142	−2
T10	(United States) Jim Gallagher Jr.	70-72=142	−2
T10	(United States) Ed Humenik	72-70=142	−2
T10	(United States) Brian Kamm	69-73=142	−2
T10	(Scotland) Sandy Lyle	72-70=142	−2
T10	(United States) Andy North	71-71=142	−2

Amateurs: Mickelson (+1), Doyle (+6), Gorgone (+7), Lee (+14).

=== Third round ===
Saturday, June 15, 1991

Place	Player	Score	To par
T1	(United States) Scott Simpson	70-68-72=210	−6
T1	(United States) Payne Stewart	67-70-73=210	−6
T3	(United States) Scott Hoch	69-71-74=214	−2
T3	(Zimbabwe) Nick Price	74-69-71=214	−2
T5	(United States) Fred Couples	70-70-75=215	−1
T5	(United States) Nolan Henke	67-71-77=215	−1
T5	(United States) Brian Kamm	69-73-73=215	−1
T8	(United States) Rick Fehr	74-69-73=216	E
T8	(United States) Hale Irwin	71-75-70=216	E
T8	(Scotland) Sandy Lyle	72-70-74=216	E
T8	(Australia) Craig Parry	70-73-73=216	E

=== Final round ===
Sunday, June 16, 1991

Place	Player	Score	To par	Money ($)
T1	(United States) Payne Stewart	67-70-73-72=282	−6	Playoff
T1	(United States) Scott Simpson	70-68-72-72=282	−6	Playoff
T3	(United States) Fred Couples	70-70-75-70=285	−3	62,574
T3	(United States) Larry Nelson	73-72-72-68=285	−3	62,574
5	(United States) Fuzzy Zoeller	72-73-74-67=286	−2	41,542
6	(United States) Scott Hoch	69-71-74-73=287	−1	36,090
7	(United States) Nolan Henke	67-71-77-73=288	E	32,176
T8	(United States) Raymond Floyd	73-72-76-68=289	+1	26,958
T8	(Spain) José María Olazábal	73-71-75-70=289	+1	26,958
T8	(United States) Corey Pavin	71-67-79-72=289	+1	26,958

Amateur: Phil Mickelson (+12)

==== Scorecard ====
Final round

Hole	1	2	3	4	5	6	7	8	9	10	11	12	13	14	15	16	17	18
Par	4	4	5	3	4	4	5	3	4	4	5	4	3	4	5	4	3	4
(United States) Stewart	−6	−6	−7	−7	−7	−6	−6	−6	−6	−6	−6	−6	−6	−6	−6	−6	−6	−6
(United States) Simpson	−6	−6	−6	−6	−6	−6	−7	−7	−7	−8	−8	−8	−8	−8	−8	−7	−7	−6
(United States) Couples	−1	−1	−2	−2	−2	−2	−3	−2	−2	−1	−1	−2	−2	−2	−2	−2	−2	−3
(United States) Nelson	+1	+1	+1	E	E	−1	−2	−2	−2	−2	−3	−3	−4	−3	−3	−3	−3	−3
(United States) Zoeller	+2	+2	+2	+2	+2	+2	+1	+1	E	E	E	E	E	−1	−1	−1	−1	−2
(United States) Hoch	−1	−1	−1	−1	E	+2	+1	+1	+1	+1	E	E	E	−1	−1	E	−1	−1
(Zimbabwe) Price	−1	E	E	+1	+1	+2	+1	+1	+1	+1	E	+1	+1	+2	+3	+3	+4	+4

Cumulative tournament scores, relative to par

Birdie	Bogey	Double bogey

=== Playoff ===
Monday, June 17, 1991

Place	Player	Score	To par	Money ($)
1	(United States) Payne Stewart	38-37=75	+3	235,000
2	(United States) Scott Simpson	37-40=77	+5	117,500

==== Scorecard ====
Hole	1	2	3	4	5	6	7	8	9	10	11	12	13	14	15	16	17	18
Par	4	4	5	3	4	4	5	3	4	4	5	4	3	4	5	4	3	4
(United States) Stewart	E	E	E	E	+1	+1	+1	+2	+2	+2	+2	+2	+2	+3	+4	+3	+3	+3
(United States) Simpson	+1	+2	+2	+2	+1	+1	E	+1	+1	+2	+2	+2	+3	+2	+2	+3	+4	+5

Cumulative playoff scores, relative to par

Birdie	Bogey
