= 1992 Ben Hogan Tour graduates =

This is a list of players who graduated from the Ben Hogan Tour in 1992. The top ten players on the Ben Hogan Tour's money list in 1992 earned their PGA Tour card for 1993.

	1992 Hogan Tour		1993 PGA Tour				
Player	Money list rank	Earnings ($)	Starts	Cuts made	Best finish	Money list rank	Earnings ($)
(United States) John Flannery*	1	164,115	31	23	T9	102	161,234
(United States) Brian Henninger*	2	128,301	30	16	T4	130	112,811
(United States) Steve Lowery	3	114,553	32	25	T10	92	188,287
(United States) Ted Tryba	4	105,952	33	16	T3	116	136,670
(United States) David Jackson	5	104,222	31	13	T16	179	53,563
(Australia) Jeff Woodland*	6	102,326	27	15	T10	163	73,367
(United States) Brian Kamm	7	88,608	27	17	T7	94	183,185
(United States) Rick Dalpos	8	78,540	28	9	T31	198	31,585
(United States) Russell Beiersdorf*	9	77,847	30	20	T13	133	111,750
(United States) Jaime Gomez*	10	75,271	30	14	T10	157	77,495

*PGA Tour rookie for 1993.

T = Tied
Green background indicates the player retained his PGA Tour card for 1994 (finished inside the top 125).
Yellow background indicates player did not retain his PGA Tour card for 1994, but retained conditional status (finished between 126–150).
Red background indicates the player did not retain his PGA Tour card for 1994 (finished outside the top 150).

== See also ==
- 1992 PGA Tour Qualifying School graduates
