= Jaime Gomez (golfer) =

American professional golfer (born 1967)

Personal information
- Nationality: United States
- Born: May 18, 1967 (age 59) Arlington, Texas, U.S.
- Height: 5 ft 9 in (1.75 m)
- Weight: 165 lb (75 kg; 11.8 st)

Career
- Sport: Golf
- College: University of Houston
- Turned professional: 1989
- Former tours: PGA Tour; Nationwide Tour; Canadian Tour
- Professional wins: 4

Number of wins by tour
- Korn Ferry Tour: 1
- Other: 3

Best results in major championships
- Masters Tournament: DNP
- PGA Championship: DNP
- U.S. Open: CUT: 1990
- The Open Championship: DNP

Jaime Gomez (born May 18, 1967) is an American professional golfer.

== Career ==
In 1967, Gomez was born in Arlington, Texas. He played college golf at the University of Houston.

In 1989, Gomez turned professional. He has played on a number of professional tours. He played on the PGA Tour's developmental tour (1991–92, 1994–98), winning the 1992 Ben Hogan Boise Open. His tenth-place finish on the tour money list earned him his PGA Tour card for 1993, where his best finish was T-10 at the Freeport-McMoRan Golf Classic. He also played on the Canadian Tour (1999, 2001, 2005, 2008–11), winning twice: 1999 Telus Calgary Open and 2005 Corona Mazatlan Classic.

== Professional wins (4) ==
=== Ben Hogan Tour wins (1) ===
No.	Date	Tournament	Winning score	Margin of victory	Runner-up
1	Sep 20, 1992	Ben Hogan Boise Open	−11 (67-68-67=202)	1 stroke	(United States) Sean Murphy

=== Canadian Tour wins (2) ===
No.	Date	Tournament	Winning score	Margin of victory	Runner-up
1	Jun 27, 1999	Telus Calgary Open	−20 (70-65-64-69=268)	1 stroke	(United States) Chris Anderson
2	May 8, 2005	Corona Mazatlán Classic	−18 (67-68-66-69=270)	3 strokes	(United States) Brien Davis

=== Other wins (1) ===
- 1996 Panama Open

== Results in major championships ==
Tournament	1990
U.S. Open	CUT

CUT = missed the halfway cut
Note: Gomez only played in the U.S. Open.

== See also ==
- 1992 Ben Hogan Tour graduates
