= Tulsa Open =

Ben Hogan Tulsa Open
Tournament information
- Location: Broken Arrow, Oklahoma
- Established: 1991
- Course: The Golf Club of Oklahoma
- Par: 72
- Tour: Ben Hogan Tour
- Format: Stroke play
- Prize fund: US$150,000
- Month played: August
- Final year: 1992

Tournament record score
- Aggregate: 210 Frank Conner (1991); 210 Tom Lehman (1991)
- To par: −6 as above

Final champion
- (United States) Steve Lowery
- Location in the United States Location in Oklahoma

The Tulsa Open was a golf tournament on the Ben Hogan Tour. It ran from 1991 to 1992. It was played at The Golf Club of Oklahoma in Broken Arrow, Oklahoma.

In 1991, the winner earned $25,000. The prize money increased to $30,000 in 1992.

== Winners ==
Year	Winner	Score	To par	Margin of victory	Runner-up
Ben Hogan Tulsa Open
1992	(United States) Steve Lowery	213	−3	Playoff	(United States) Jeff Coston
1991	(United States) Frank Conner	210	−6	Playoff	(United States) Tom Lehman
