= 1999 PGA Tour =

Golf tour season

1999 PGA Tour season
- Duration: January 7, 1999 – November 7, 1999
- Number of official events: 47
- Most wins: (United States) Tiger Woods (8)
- Money list: (United States) Tiger Woods
- PGA Tour Player of the Year: (United States) Tiger Woods
- PGA Player of the Year: (United States) Tiger Woods
- Rookie of the Year: (Paraguay) Carlos Franco

The 1999 PGA Tour was the 84th season of the PGA Tour, the main professional golf tour in the United States. It was also the 31st season since separating from the PGA of America.

== Caddie shorts policy ==
After caddie Garland Dempsey collapsed at the Western Open in early July, the PGA Tour allowed male caddies, on a trial basis, to wear shorts on extremely hot days. Two years earlier, the USGA changed its policy and allowed caddies to wear shorts at the U.S. Open in June 1997.

== Schedule ==
The following table lists official events during the 1999 season.

Date	Tournament	Location	Purse (US$)	Winner (Note: The number in parentheses after each winner's name is the number of PGA Tour events they had won up to and including that tournament. This information is only shown for PGA Tour members.)	OWGR points	Notes
Jan 10	Mercedes Championships	Hawaii	2,600,000	(United States) David Duval (8)	58	Winners-only event
Jan 17	Sony Open in Hawaii	Hawaii	2,600,000	(United States) Jeff Sluman (4)	50	
Jan 24	Bob Hope Chrysler Classic	California	3,000,000	(United States) David Duval (9)	52	Pro-Am
Jan 31	Phoenix Open	Arizona	3,000,000	(United States) Rocco Mediate (3)	60	
Feb 7	AT&T Pebble Beach National Pro-Am	California	2,800,000	(United States) Payne Stewart (10)	60	Pro-Am
Feb 14	Buick Invitational	California	2,700,000	(United States) Tiger Woods (8)	52	
Feb 21	Nissan Open	California	2,800,000	(South Africa) Ernie Els (7)	66	
Feb 28	WGC-Andersen Consulting Match Play Championship	California	5,000,000	(United States) Jeff Maggert (2)	76	New tournament World Golf Championship
Feb 28	Touchstone Energy Tucson Open	Arizona	2,750,000	(Sweden) Gabriel Hjertstedt (2)	24	Alternate event
Mar 7	Doral-Ryder Open	Florida	3,000,000	(Australia) Steve Elkington (10)	50	
Mar 14	Honda Classic	Florida	2,600,000	(Fiji) Vijay Singh (8)	52	
Mar 21	Bay Hill Invitational	Florida	2,500,000	(United States) Tim Herron (3)	70	Invitational
Mar 28	The Players Championship	Florida	5,000,000	(United States) David Duval (10)	80	Flagship event
Apr 4	BellSouth Classic	Georgia	2,500,000	(United States) David Duval (11)	54	
Apr 11	Masters Tournament	Georgia	4,000,000	(Spain) José María Olazábal (5)	100	Major championship
Apr 18	MCI Classic	South Carolina	2,500,000	(United States) Glen Day (1)	62	Invitational
Apr 25	Greater Greensboro Chrysler Classic	North Carolina	2,600,000	(Sweden) Jesper Parnevik (2)	46	
May 2	Shell Houston Open	Texas	2,500,000	(Australia) Stuart Appleby (3)	48	
May 9	Compaq Classic of New Orleans	Louisiana	2,600,000	(Paraguay) Carlos Franco (1)	52	
May 16	GTE Byron Nelson Classic	Texas	3,000,000	(United States) Loren Roberts (6)	58	
May 23	MasterCard Colonial	Texas	2,800,000	(United States) Olin Browne (2)	60	Invitational
May 30	Kemper Open	Maryland	2,500,000	(United States) Rich Beem (1)	48	
Jun 6	Memorial Tournament	Ohio	2,550,000	(United States) Tiger Woods (9)	70	Invitational
Jun 14	FedEx St. Jude Classic	Tennessee	2,500,000	(United States) Ted Tryba (2)	50	
Jun 20	U.S. Open	North Carolina	3,500,000	(United States) Payne Stewart (11)	100	Major championship
Jun 27	Buick Classic	New York	2,500,000	(United States) Duffy Waldorf (2)	54	
Jul 4	Motorola Western Open	Illinois	2,500,000	(United States) Tiger Woods (10)	54	
Jul 11	Greater Milwaukee Open	Wisconsin	2,300,000	(Paraguay) Carlos Franco (2)	26	
Jul 18	The Open Championship	Scotland	£2,000,000	(Scotland) Paul Lawrie (1)	100	Major championship
Jul 25	John Deere Classic	Illinois	2,000,000	(United States) J. L. Lewis (1)	24	
Aug 1	Canon Greater Hartford Open	Connecticut	2,500,000	(United States) Brent Geiberger (1)	48	
Aug 8	Buick Open	Michigan	2,400,000	(United States) Tom Pernice Jr. (1)	58	
Aug 15	PGA Championship	Illinois	3,500,000	(United States) Tiger Woods (11)	100	Major championship
Aug 22	Sprint International	Colorado	2,600,000	(United States) David Toms (2)	64	
Aug 29	WGC-NEC Invitational	Ohio	5,000,000	(United States) Tiger Woods (12)	68	New tournament World Golf Championship
Aug 29	Reno–Tahoe Open	Nevada	2,750,000	(United States) Notah Begay III (1)	32	New tournament Alternate event
Sep 5	Air Canada Championship	Canada	2,500,000	(Canada) Mike Weir (1)	34	
Sep 12	Bell Canadian Open	Canada	2,500,000	(United States) Hal Sutton (11)	48	
Sep 20	B.C. Open	New York	1,600,000	(United States) Brad Faxon (5)	26	
Sep 26	Westin Texas Open	Texas	2,000,000	(United States) Duffy Waldorf (3)	34	
Oct 3	Buick Challenge	Georgia	1,800,000	(United States) David Toms (3)	48	
Oct 10	Michelob Championship at Kingsmill	Virginia	2,500,000	(United States) Notah Begay III (2)	48	
Oct 17	Las Vegas Invitational	Nevada	2,500,000	(United States) Jim Furyk (4)	52	
Oct 24	National Car Rental Golf Classic Disney	Florida	2,500,000	(United States) Tiger Woods (13)	58	
Oct 31	The Tour Championship	Texas	5,000,000	(United States) Tiger Woods (14)	60	Tour Championship
Nov 1	Southern Farm Bureau Classic	Mississippi	2,000,000	(United States) Brian Henninger (2)	24	Alternate event
Nov 7	WGC-American Express Championship	Spain	5,000,000	(United States) Tiger Woods (15)	70	New tournament World Golf Championship

=== Unofficial events ===
The following events were sanctioned by the PGA Tour, but did not carry official money, nor were wins official.

Date	Tournament	Location	Purse ($)	Winner(s)	Notes
Aug 3	CVS Charity Classic	Rhode Island	1,000,000	(Australia) Stuart Appleby and (United States) Jeff Sluman	New tournament Team event
Sep 26	Ryder Cup	Massachusetts	n/a	Team USA	Team event
Nov 14	Franklin Templeton Shark Shootout	California	1,500,000	(United States) Fred Couples and (United States) David Duval	Team event
Nov 21	World Cup of Golf	Malaysia	1,300,000	(United States) Mark O'Meara and (United States) Tiger Woods	Team event
Nov 21	World Cup of Golf Individual Trophy	Malaysia	200,000	(United States) Tiger Woods	
Nov 24	PGA Grand Slam of Golf	Hawaii	1,000,000	(United States) Tiger Woods	Limited-field event
Nov 28	Skins Game	California	1,000,000	(United States) Fred Couples	Limited-field event
Dec 5	JCPenney Classic	Florida	2,000,000	(United States) John Daly and (England) Laura Davies	Team event
Dec 12	Diners Club Matches	California	400,000	(United States) Mark Calcavecchia and (United States) Fred Couples	Team event
Dec 19	Wendy's 3-Tour Challenge	Nevada	651,000	Senior PGA Tour	Team event

== Location of tournaments ==
Location of official tournaments of the 1999 PGA Tour in the continental United States and Canada.
Players & Majors
World Golf Championships
Regular events
Alternate events
Tour Championship
Location of official tournaments of the 1999 PGA Tour outside the continental United States and Canada.
Players & Majors
World Golf Championships
Regular events

== Money list ==
The money list was based on prize money won during the season, calculated in U.S. dollars.

Position	Player	Prize money ($)
1	(United States) Tiger Woods	6,616,585
2	(United States) David Duval	3,641,906
3	(United States) Davis Love III	2,475,328
4	(Fiji) Vijay Singh	2,283,233
5	(United States) Chris Perry	2,145,707
6	(United States) Hal Sutton	2,127,578
7	(United States) Payne Stewart	2,077,950
8	(United States) Justin Leonard	2,020,991
9	(United States) Jeff Maggert	2,016,469
10	(United States) David Toms	1,959,672

== Awards ==
Award	Winner	Ref.
PGA Tour Player of the Year (Jack Nicklaus Trophy)	(United States) Tiger Woods	
PGA Player of the Year	(United States) Tiger Woods	
Rookie of the Year	(Paraguay) Carlos Franco	
Scoring leader (PGA Tour – Byron Nelson Award)	(United States) Tiger Woods	
Scoring leader (PGA – Vardon Trophy)	(United States) Tiger Woods	
Comeback Player of the Year	(United States) Steve Pate	

== See also ==
- 1999 Nike Tour
- 1999 Senior PGA Tour
