= 1974 PGA Tour Qualifying School graduates =

This is a list of the 1974 PGA Tour Qualifying School graduates.

== Tournament summary ==
After three 72-hole regional qualifiers, there were 78 players in the 144-hole final qualifying tournament. The finals were played over two weeks in November at Silverado Country Club in Napa, California and Canyon Country Club in Palm Springs, California.

The top 19 players earned their tour card. Fuzzy Zoeller was the medalist. Bob Risch finished runner-up in what was his fourth attempt to earn playing privileges. Billy Kratzert attempted to earn his PGA Tour card for the first time. He was not successful.

== List of graduates ==
Place	Player	Notes
1	(United States) Fuzzy Zoeller	
2	(United States) Bob Risch	
3	(United States) George Cadle	
4	(England) Peter Oosterhuis	7 European Tour wins, 3 Sunshine Tour wins
5	(United States) Alan Tapie	
6	(United States) Dave Newquist	
T7	(United States) Rex Caldwell	
T7	(United States) Bill Rogers	Played on 1973 Walker Cup team
9	(United States) Bobby Wadkins	
T10	(United States) John Abendroth	
T10	(United States) Frank Conner	
12	(United States) Greg Trompas	
13	(United States) Jack Spradlin	
T14	(United States) Ray Carrasco	
T14	(United States) Danny Edwards	Fifth place at 1974 Open Championship
T14	(United States) Roger Maltbie	Winner of 1972 California State Amateur
17	(Argentina) Florentino Molina	Winner of 1971 and 1973 Argentine Open
T18	(Canada) Dan Halldorson	
T18	(United States) Jimmy Wittenberg	
