= Colorado Classic (golf) =

American golf tournament

Nike Colorado Classic
Tournament information
- Location: Brighton, Colorado
- Established: 1996
- Course: Riverdale Golf Course
- Par: 71
- Tour: Nike Tour
- Format: Stroke play
- Prize fund: US$200,000
- Month played: September
- Final year: 1997

Tournament record score
- Aggregate: 267 Pat Bates (1997)
- To par: −17 as above

Final champion
- (United States) Pat Bates
- Location in the United States Location in Colorado

The Colorado Classic was a golf tournament on the Nike Tour. It ran from 1996 to 1997. It was played at Riverdale Golf Course in Brighton, Colorado.

In 1997 the winner was Pat Bates, who earned $36,000.

== Winners ==
Year	Winner	Score	To par	Margin of victory	Runner(s)-up
Nike Colorado Classic
1997	(United States) Pat Bates	267	−17	1 stroke	(United States) J. L. Lewis
1996	(United States) Stewart Cink	268	−16	1 stroke	(United States) David Berganio Jr. (United States) Michael Christie
