= Gary Webb (golfer) =

American golfer (born 1961)

Personal information
- Nationality: United States
- Born: July 17, 1961 (age 65) Pampa, Texas, U.S.
- Height: 5 ft 9 in (1.75 m)
- Weight: 165 lb (75 kg; 11.8 st)

Career
- Sport: Golf
- College: University of Texas
- Turned professional: 1984
- Former tour: Nationwide Tour
- Professional wins: 4

Number of wins by tour
- Korn Ferry Tour: 2
- Other: 2

Gary Webb (born July 17, 1961) is an American professional golfer who played on the Nationwide Tour.

== Early life ==
Webb was born in Pampa, Texas. He played college golf at the University of Texas at Austin.

== Professional career ==
In 1984, Webb turned pro. In 1991, Webb joined the Ben Hogan Tour and recorded four top-10 finishes in his rookie year. He only played in 15 events from 1992 to 1995 but finished in a tie for second at the Nike Dakota Dunes Open in 1994. Two years later he picked up his first win on Tour in a playoff at the Nike Dakota Dunes Open. He picked up his second victory at the Nike Fort Smith Classic in 1999. His last full season on the Nationwide Tour came in 2000 and he played in his last event on Tour in 2003.

== Professional wins (4) ==
=== Asia Golf Circuit wins (2) ===
No.	Date	Tournament	Winning score	Margin of victory	Runner-up
1	Mar 21, 1993	Sampoerna Indonesia Open	−14 (69-66-70-69=274)	Playoff	(Sweden) Niclas Fasth
2	Nov 19, 1995	Hong Kong Open	−13 (68-69-68-66=271)	2 strokes	(Mexico) Rafael Alarcón

=== Nike Tour wins (2) ===
No.	Date	Tournament	Winning score	Margin of victory	Runner-up
1	Jun 30, 1996	Nike Dakota Dunes Open	−13 (69-68-69-69=275)	Playoff	(United States) Chad Magee
2	Aug 22, 1999	Nike Fort Smith Classic	−16 (65-66-65-68=264)	1 stroke	(United States) Matt Peterson

Nike Tour playoff record (1–0)

No.	Year	Tournament	Opponent	Result
1	1996	Nike Dakota Dunes Open	(United States) Chad Magee	Won with par on second extra hole
