= Rick Todd =

Canadian professional golfer (born 1962

Personal information
- Nationality: Canada
- Born: October 3, 1962 (age 64) Toronto, Ontario, Canada
- Height: 5 ft 10 in (1.78 m)
- Weight: 195 lb (88 kg; 13.9 st)

Career
- Sport: Golf
- College: University of Texas at El Paso
- Turned professional: 1987
- Former tours: PGA Tour; Japan Golf Tour; Asian Tour; Asia Golf Circuit; Nationwide Tour; Canadian Tour
- Professional wins: 5

Number of wins by tour
- Korn Ferry Tour: 2
- Other: 3

Best results in major championships
- Masters Tournament: DNP
- PGA Championship: DNP
- U.S. Open: CUT: 1998
- The Open Championship: T71: 1996

Achievements and awards
- Asia Golf Circuit Order of Merit winner: 1995–96

Rick Todd (born October 3, 1962) is a Canadian professional golfer who played on the PGA Tour, Nationwide Tour, Asian Tour, Japan Golf Tour and the Canadian Tour.

== Early life and amateur career ==
Todd was born in Toronto, Ontario. He played college golf at the University of Texas at El Paso (UTEP). He was second team All-American in 1986, third team in 1985 and honorable mention in 1984 and made the All-WAC first team four years in a row. He won four tournaments while at UTEP and was elected into the El Paso Golf Hall of Fame in 1984.

== Professional career ==
In 1987, Todd turned pro. He joined the PGA Tour in 1990, earning his card through qualifying school. After an unsuccessful year on tour, he joined the Ben Hogan Tour where he won the Ben Hogan El Paso Open in his rookie season. The following year he won the Ben Hogan Dakota Dunes Open. In his last full season on the tour in 1993 he recorded three top-10 finishes.

Todd won the Asia Golf Circuit Order of Merit in 1996, which qualified him on the Japan Golf Tour, where he played in 1996 and 1997. He won three times on the Canadian Tour between 1991 and 1997.

Todd was the head coach at his alma mater, UTEP, from 1999 to 2011 and was named WAC Coach of the Year in 2001.

Todd represented his country in 1996 at the World Cup and the Dunhill Cup.

== Awards and honors ==
- In 1984, Todd was elected into the El Paso Golf Hall of Fame
- Todd was the Order of Merit winner for the Asia Golf Circuit during the 1995-96 season

== Amateur wins ==
- 1985 Ontario Amateur

== Professional wins (5) ==
=== Ben Hogan Tour wins (2) ===
No.	Date	Tournament	Winning score	Margin of victory	Runner-up
1	Sep 29, 1991	Ben Hogan El Paso Open	−8 (67-66-69=202)	1 stroke	(United States) Tom Eubank
2	Jul 19, 1992	Ben Hogan Dakota Dunes Open	−9 (69-67-71=207)	Playoff	(United States) David Jackson

Ben Hogan Tour playoff record (1–0)

No.	Year	Tournament	Opponent	Result
1	1992	Ben Hogan Dakota Dunes Open	(United States) David Jackson	Won with par on second extra hole

=== Canadian Tour wins (3) ===
No.	Date	Tournament	Winning score	Margin of victory	Runner(s)-up
1	Jun 9, 1991	Payless-Pepsi Victoria Open	−18 (66-67-66-63=262)	7 strokes	(United States) Louis Brown
2	Jun 16, 1991	Canadian Home Assurance Alberta Open	−4 (70-71-68-67=276)	1 stroke	(United States) Ken Mattiace
3	Jun 1, 1997	Payless Open (2)	−11 (69-66-71-67=273)	1 stroke	(Canada) Philip Jonas, (United States) Dave Pashko

== Results in major championships ==
Tournament	1996	1997	1998
U.S. Open			CUT
The Open Championship	T71		

Note: Todd never played in the Masters Tournament or the PGA Championship.

Did not play

CUT = missed the half-way cut
"T" = tied

== Canadian national team appearances ==
- World Cup: 1996
- Dunhill Cup: 1996

== See also ==
- 1989 PGA Tour Qualifying School graduates
