= Ted Tryba =

American golfer

Personal information
- Nationality: United States
- Born: January 15, 1967 (age 59) Wilkes-Barre, Pennsylvania, U.S.
- Height: 6 ft 4 in (1.93 m)
- Weight: 205 lb (93 kg; 14.6 st)

Career
- Sport: Golf
- College: Ohio State University
- Turned professional: 1989
- Former tour: PGA Tour
- Professional wins: 5
- Highest ranking: 48 (October 3, 1999)

Number of wins by tour
- PGA Tour: 2
- Korn Ferry Tour: 3

Best results in major championships
- Masters Tournament: CUT: 1996, 2000
- PGA Championship: T31: 1999
- U.S. Open: T37: 2000
- The Open Championship: CUT: 1999, 2000

Ted Tryba (born January 15, 1967) is an American professional golfer. He has played on the PGA Tour and the Nationwide Tour.

== Early life ==
Tryba was born in Wilkes-Barre, Pennsylvania. When he was four years old, he lost the sight in his left eye as the result of a freak accident. "I was standing in my yard on a windy day watching a big branch fall out of a tree. It got on me quick and hit me in the eye." All he could do was learn to adjust to his vision handicap. "I really had no big adjustments to make," he said. "If there is such a thing as a lucky accident, I guess that was it. If it had happened when I was a teenager or in my 20s, I may have had some problems. I see things a little different than everybody else. Sometimes it makes it difficult to do things, but I've never used it as a crutch."

Tryba played golf at Ohio State University.

== Professional career ==
Early in his career, Tryba had three victories on the Ben Hogan Tour, the name of the PGA Tour's developmental tour at the time. In the late 1990s, he won twice on the PGA Tour. His best finish in a major is T-31 at the 1999 PGA Championship. He has featured in the top 50 of the Official World Golf Rankings. The last cut he made on the PGA Tour was in 2005.

Tryba joined The Golf Channel as an analyst in October 2007.

== Personal life ==
Tryba lives in Orlando, Florida.

== Professional wins (5) ==
=== PGA Tour wins (2) ===
No.	Date	Tournament	Winning score	Margin of victory	Runner(s)-up
1	Jul 16, 1995	Anheuser-Busch Golf Classic	−12 (69-67-68-68=272)	1 stroke	(United States) Scott Simpson
2	Jun 13, 1999	FedEx St. Jude Classic	−19 (68-64-67-66=265)	2 strokes	(United States) Tim Herron, (United States) Tom Lehman

PGA Tour playoff record (0–1)

No.	Year	Tournament	Opponent	Result
1	1999	Westin Texas Open	(United States) Duffy Waldorf	Lost to birdie on first extra hole

=== Ben Hogan Tour wins (3) ===
No.	Date	Tournament	Winning score	Margin of victory	Runner(s)-up
1	Apr 22, 1990	Ben Hogan Gateway Open	−7 (72-70-67=209)	Playoff	(United States) John Daly, (United States) Bruce Fleisher
2	Sep 22, 1991	Ben Hogan Utah Classic	−14 (65-68-69=202)	1 stroke	(United States) Webb Heintzelman
3	Apr 19, 1992	Ben Hogan Shreveport Open	−14 (67-68-67=202)	2 strokes	(United States) Skip Kendall

Ben Hogan Tour playoff record (1–1)

No.	Year	Tournament	Opponents	Result
1	1990	Ben Hogan Gateway Open	(United States) John Daly, (United States) Bruce Fleisher	Won with eagle on first extra hole
2	1992	Ben Hogan Greater Ozarks Open	(United States) Lennie Clements, (United States) Tommy Tolles	Clements won with birdie on first extra hole

== Results in major championships ==
Tournament	1994	1995	1996	1997	1998	1999	2000
Masters Tournament			CUT				CUT
U.S. Open		T51	CUT	CUT		T66	T37
The Open Championship						CUT	CUT
PGA Championship	CUT	CUT	CUT		T56	T31	CUT

Did not play

CUT = missed the half-way cut
"T" indicates a tie for a place

== Results in The Players Championship ==
Tournament	1994	1995	1996	1997	1998	1999	2000
The Players Championship	T35	CUT	CUT	CUT	T61	CUT	T73

CUT = missed the halfway cut
"T" indicates a tie for a place

== Results in World Golf Championships ==
Tournament	1999	2000
Match Play		R64
Championship	T48	
Invitational		

Did not play

QF, R16, R32, R64 = Round in which player lost in match play
"T" = Tied

== See also ==
- 1989 PGA Tour Qualifying School graduates
- 1992 Ben Hogan Tour graduates
