= Steve Lowery =

American professional golfer

Personal information
- Full name: Stephen Brent Lowery
- Nationality: United States
- Born: October 12, 1960 (age 66) Birmingham, Alabama, U.S.
- Height: 6 ft 2 in (1.88 m)
- Weight: 225 lb (102 kg; 16.1 st)

Career
- Sport: Golf
- College: University of Alabama
- Turned professional: 1983
- Current tour: Champions Tour
- Former tours: PGA Tour; Ben Hogan Tour; U.S. Golf Tour
- Professional wins: 7
- Highest ranking: 32 (October 6, 2002)

Number of wins by tour
- PGA Tour: 3
- Korn Ferry Tour: 1
- Other: 3

Best results in major championships
- Masters Tournament: T40: 2001, 2002
- PGA Championship: 3rd: 2001
- U.S. Open: T16: 1994
- The Open Championship: T36: 2004

Stephen Brent Lowery (born October 12, 1960) is an American professional golfer.

== Early life ==
Lowery was born in Birmingham, Alabama. Lowery won the Birmingham Golf Association Junior and State Junior in the late 1970s.

== Amateur career ==
Lowery attended the University of Alabama. He played for coach Conrad Rehling from 1979-1983 on the Alabama Crimson Tide golf team.

== Professional career ==
Lowery earned PGA Tour membership through 1987 PGA Tour Qualifying School. His best season on the PGA Tour was in 1994, when he finished 12th on the money list and won his first tournament.

He played one of the most memorable stretches in PGA Tour history at The International in 2002. The event was played under the Stableford Points format. On the 14th hole, Lowery went up and down from the water on a "splash" shot, leading to a birdie earning two points. On the following hole, he holed out a wedge from the fairway for an eagle earning five points. Two holes later, on the par-5 17th, Lowery holed out a shot from over 200 yards for a rare double eagle (or albatross) to earn eight more points and suddenly pull within one point. His double eagle was one of the most dramatic in PGA Tour history since Gene Sarazen's at the 1935 Masters Tournament. Lowery ultimately lost by the same margin after missing a birdie putt on the last hole.

Lowery missed most of 2007 with a wrist injury. The PGA Tour granted him a partial exemption for the 2008 season. He needed to win more than $250,000 during his first eight starts in 2008 in order to re-gain his full exemption on the PGA Tour, but that became a moot point when he won the 2008 AT&T Pebble Beach National Pro-Am. The victory gave him a full two-year exemption.

== Amateur wins ==
this list may be incomplete

- 1982 Southern Amateur

== Professional wins (7) ==
=== PGA Tour wins (3) ===
No.	Date	Tournament	Winning score	Margin of victory	Runner-up
1	Aug 21, 1994	Sprint International	35 pts (7-14-5-9=35)	Playoff	(United States) Rick Fehr
2	Nov 5, 2000	Southern Farm Bureau Classic	−22 (64-67-65-70=266)	Playoff	(United States) Skip Kendall
3	Feb 10, 2008	AT&T Pebble Beach National Pro-Am	−10 (69-71-70-68=278)	Playoff	(Fiji) Vijay Singh

PGA Tour playoff record (3–0)

No.	Year	Tournament	Opponent	Result
1	1994	Sprint International	(United States) Rick Fehr	Won with par on first extra hole
2	2000	Southern Farm Bureau Classic	(United States) Skip Kendall	Won with birdie on first extra hole
3	2008	AT&T Pebble Beach National Pro-Am	(Fiji) Vijay Singh	Won with birdie on first extra hole

=== Ben Hogan Tour wins (1) ===
No.	Date	Tournament	Winning score	Margin of victory	Runner-up
1	Aug 23, 1992	Ben Hogan Tulsa Open	−3 (70-70-73=213)	Playoff	(United States) Jeff Coston

Ben Hogan Tour playoff record (1–0)

No.	Year	Tournament	Opponent	Result
1	1992	Ben Hogan Tulsa Open	(United States) Jeff Coston	Won with birdie on second extra hole

=== U.S. Golf Tour wins (1) ===
No.	Date	Tournament	Winning score	Margin of victory	Runners-up
1	Apr 30, 1989	Wedgewood Tournament	−17 (66-67-65-65=263)	1 stroke	(Canada) Philip Jonas, (United States) Brian Kamm

=== Space Coast Tour wins (2) ===
- 1987 Wedgewood tournament
- 1990 Wedgewood tournament

== Results in major championships ==
Tournament	1988	1989
Masters Tournament		
U.S. Open	CUT	
The Open Championship		
PGA Championship		

Tournament	1990	1991	1992	1993	1994	1995	1996	1997	1998	1999
Masters Tournament						CUT	T41			
U.S. Open				T33	T16	T56	T60			CUT
The Open Championship						T79				
PGA Championship					CUT	T8	CUT	T58	T44	

Tournament	2000	2001	2002	2003	2004	2005	2006	2007	2008
Masters Tournament		T40	T40	CUT					CUT
U.S. Open		T24	CUT	T42		CUT	CUT		
The Open Championship					T36				
PGA Championship	T51	3	T10	CUT	CUT		T60		CUT

Top 10
Did not play

CUT = missed the half-way cut
"T" = tied

=== Summary ===
Tournament	Wins	2nd	3rd	Top-5	Top-10	Top-25	Events	Cuts made
Masters Tournament	0	0	0	0	0	0	6	3
U.S. Open	0	0	0	0	0	2	11	6
The Open Championship	0	0	0	0	0	0	2	2
PGA Championship	0	0	1	1	3	3	12	7
Totals	0	0	1	1	3	5	31	18

- Most consecutive cuts made – 5 (twice)
- Longest streak of top-10s – 1 (three times)

== Results in The Players Championship ==
Tournament	1994	1995	1996	1997	1998	1999	2000	2001	2002	2003	2004	2005	2006	2007	2008	2009
The Players Championship	T6	DQ	T46	T65	CUT	CUT	T66	CUT	T22	WD	CUT	T12	T56	T28	CUT	CUT

Top 10
Did not play

CUT = missed the halfway cut
WD = withdrew
DQ = disqualified
"T" indicates a tie for a place

== Results in World Golf Championships ==
Tournament	2001	2002	2003	2004	2005	2006	2007	2008
Match Play	R64	R32	R32					
Championship	NT^{1}	T15						
Invitational		8						T20

^{1}Cancelled due to 9/11

Top 10
Did not play

QF, R16, R32, R64 = Round in which player lost in match play
"T" = Tied
NT = No tournament

== See also ==
- 1987 PGA Tour Qualifying School graduates
- 1992 Ben Hogan Tour graduates
