= David Jackson (golfer) =

American professional golfer

Personal information
- Full name: David Alan Jackson
- Nationality: United States
- Born: June 3, 1964 (age 62) Valdosta, Georgia, U.S.
- Height: 6 ft 3 in (1.91 m)
- Weight: 185 lb (84 kg; 13.2 st)

Career
- Sport: Golf
- College: University of Florida
- Turned professional: 1986
- Former tour: PGA Tour
- Professional wins: 1

Number of wins by tour
- Korn Ferry Tour: 1

Best results in major championships
- Masters Tournament: DNP
- PGA Championship: DNP
- U.S. Open: CUT: 1991
- The Open Championship: DNP

David Alan Jackson (born June 3, 1964) is an American professional golfer and former PGA Tour member.

== Early life and amateur career ==
In 1964, Jackson was born in Valdosta, Georgia.

He attended the University of Florida in Gainesville, Florida, where he played for the Florida Gators men's golf team in National Collegiate Athletic Association (NCAA) competition from 1983 to 1986. During his college career, he was a two-time individual medalist and the Gators won the Southeastern Conference (SEC) team championship in 1985. He was a first-team All-SEC selection three times (1984, 1985, 1986). Jackson also received All-American honors four times. He graduated from the university with a bachelor's degree in exercise and sport science in 1986.

== Professional career ==
In 1986, Jackson turned pro. He played on the PGA Tour and its developmental tour from 1989 to 1998. On the PGA Tour (1989, 1993), his best finish was T-14 at the 1986 Tallahassee Open. On the developmental tour (1990–92, 1994–98) his best finish was a win at the 1992 Ben Hogan Cleveland Open.

== Professional wins (1) ==
=== Ben Hogan Tour wins (1) ===
| No. | Date | Tournament | Winning score | Margin of victory | Runners-up |
|---|---|---|---|---|---|
| 1 | Jun 14, 1992 | Ben Hogan Cleveland Open | −17 (65-67-67=199) | 3 strokes | (United States) Dave Miley, (United States) Mike Putnam |

Ben Hogan Tour playoff record (0–1)

| No. | Year | Tournament | Opponent | Result |
|---|---|---|---|---|
| 1 | 1992 | Ben Hogan Dakota Dunes Open | (Canada) Rick Todd | Lost to par on second extra hole |

== Results in major championships ==
| Tournament | 1991 |
|---|---|
| U.S. Open | CUT |

CUT = missed the halfway cut
Note: Jackson only played in the U.S. Open.

== See also ==
- 1988 PGA Tour Qualifying School graduates
- 1992 Ben Hogan Tour graduates
- List of Florida Gators men's golfers on the PGA Tour
- List of University of Florida alumni
