= Brian Kamm =

American professional golfer (born 1961)

Personal information
- Nationality: United States
- Born: September 3, 1961 (age 65) Rochester, New York, U.S.
- Height: 5 ft 6 in (1.68 m)
- Weight: 160 lb (73 kg; 11 st)

Career
- Sport: Golf
- College: Florida State University
- Turned professional: 1985
- Former tours: PGA Tour; Nationwide Tour
- Professional wins: 2

Number of wins by tour
- Korn Ferry Tour: 1
- Other: 1

Best results in major championships
- Masters Tournament: DNP
- PGA Championship: 70th: 1995
- U.S. Open: T31: 1991
- The Open Championship: DNP

Brian Kamm (born September 3, 1961) is an American professional golfer who played on the PGA Tour and the Nationwide Tour.

== Career ==
Kamm joined the PGA Tour in 1990, earning his card through qualifying school. He struggled during his rookie year on Tour, only cracking the top-50 once but he retained his card through qualifying school. In his second year on Tour his play improved and he recorded a tie for eighth finish at the Canadian Open. He was also in contention at the U.S. Open but shot a final round 79 (+7) and finished in a tie for 31st.

He joined the Nationwide Tour in 1992 and quickly found success. He recorded nine top-10 finishes including a win at the Ben Hogan Panama City Beach Classic. This success helped him finish 7th on the money list, good enough for a PGA Tour card for 1993. In his return to the PGA Tour he finished 94th on the money list, the best finish of his career and recorded three top-10 finishes. His success continued in 1994 and he finished 98th on the money list while recording three top-10 finishes including a tie for sixth finish at the Bell Canadian Open, the best finish of his career on Tour.

In 1995, he finished 118th on the money list while recording two top-10 finishes. His play declined in 1996 and he finished 190th on the money list. He returned to the Nationwide Tour in 1997 and played well, recording five top-5 finishes including three runners-up. This helped him finish 8th on the money list, good enough for a PGA Tour card for 1998. In his return to the PGA Tour he struggled and finished 189th on the money list. He returned to the Nationwide Tour in 1999 and would play on the Tour until 2003. During that time he recorded seven top-10 finishes, five of which came in 2001.

He currently coaches the men's and women's golf team at King University in Bristol, Tennessee.

== Amateur wins (1) ==
- 1983 Monroe Invitational

== Professional wins (2) ==
=== Ben Hogan Tour wins (1) ===
No.	Date	Tournament	Winning score	Margin of victory	Runner-up
1	Mar 22, 1992	Ben Hogan Panama City Beach Classic	−6 (70-71-69=210)	1 stroke	(United States) Jeff Gallagher

=== Other wins (1) ===
- 1997 Honda International

== Results in major championships ==
Tournament	1991	1992	1993	1994	1995
U.S. Open	T31			CUT	
PGA Championship					70

Did not play

CUT = missed the half-way cut
"T" = tied
Note: Kamm never played in the Masters Tournament or The Open Championship.

== See also ==
- 1989 PGA Tour Qualifying School graduates
- 1990 PGA Tour Qualifying School graduates
- 1992 Ben Hogan Tour graduates
- 1997 Nike Tour graduates
