= 1987 PGA Tour =

Golf tour season

1987 PGA Tour season
- Duration: January 7, 1987 – November 1, 1987
- Number of official events: 46
- Most wins: (United States) Paul Azinger (3) (United States) Curtis Strange (3)
- Money list: (United States) Curtis Strange
- PGA Player of the Year: (United States) Paul Azinger
- Rookie of the Year: (United States) Keith Clearwater

The 1987 PGA Tour was the 72nd season of the PGA Tour, the main professional golf tour in the United States. It was also the 19th season since separating from the PGA of America.

== Schedule ==
The following table lists official events during the 1987 season.

Date	Tournament	Location	Purse (US$)	Winner (Note: The number in parentheses after each winner's name is the number of PGA Tour events they had won up to and including that tournament. This information is only shown for PGA Tour members.)	OWGR points	Notes
Jan 10	MONY Tournament of Champions	California	500,000	(United States) Mac O'Grady (2)	52	Winners-only event
Jan 18	Bob Hope Chrysler Classic	California	900,000	(United States) Corey Pavin (5)	58	Pro-Am
Jan 25	Phoenix Open	Arizona	600,000	(United States) Paul Azinger (1)	54	
Feb 1	AT&T Pebble Beach National Pro-Am	California	600,000	(United States) Johnny Miller (24)	60	Pro-Am
Feb 8	Hawaiian Open	Hawaii	600,000	(United States) Corey Pavin (6)	48	
Feb 15	Shearson Lehman Brothers Andy Williams Open	California	500,000	(United States) George Burns (4)	48	
Feb 22	Los Angeles Open	California	600,000	(Taiwan) Chen Tze-chung (1)	48	
Mar 1	Doral-Ryder Open	Florida	1,000,000	(United States) Lanny Wadkins (16)	64	
Mar 8	Honda Classic	Florida	600,000	(United States) Mark Calcavecchia (2)	54	
Mar 15	Hertz Bay Hill Classic	Florida	600,000	(United States) Payne Stewart (3)	58	
Mar 22	USF&G Classic	Louisiana	500,000	(United States) Ben Crenshaw (13)	42	
Mar 29	Tournament Players Championship	Florida	1,000,000	(Scotland) Sandy Lyle (3)	70	Special event
Apr 5	Greater Greensboro Open	North Carolina	600,000	(United States) Scott Simpson (3)	46	
Apr 12	Masters Tournament	Georgia	875,000	(United States) Larry Mize (2)	100	Major championship
Apr 12	Deposit Guaranty Golf Classic	Mississippi	200,000	(United States) David Ogrin (n/a)	10	Alternate event (Note: Official money; unofficial win.)
Apr 19	MCI Heritage Golf Classic	South Carolina	650,000	(United States) Davis Love III (1)	50	Invitational
Apr 26	Big "I" Houston Open	Texas	600,000	(United States) Jay Haas (6)	50	
May 3	Panasonic Las Vegas Invitational	Nevada	1,250,000	(United States) Paul Azinger (2)	58	
May 10	Byron Nelson Golf Classic	Texas	600,000	(United States) Fred Couples (3)	48	
May 17	Colonial National Invitation	Texas	600,000	(United States) Keith Clearwater (1)	52	Invitational
May 24	Georgia-Pacific Atlanta Golf Classic	Georgia	600,000	(Canada) Dave Barr (2)	46	
May 31	Memorial Tournament	Ohio	850,000	(United States) Don Pooley (2)	60	Invitational
Jun 7	Kemper Open	Maryland	700,000	(United States) Tom Kite (10)	48	
Jun 14	Manufacturers Hanover Westchester Classic	New York	600,000	(United States) J. C. Snead (8)	42	
Jun 21	U.S. Open	California	825,000	(United States) Scott Simpson (4)	100	Major championship
Jun 28	Canon Sammy Davis Jr.-Greater Hartford Open	Connecticut	700,000	(United States) Paul Azinger (3)	42	
Jul 5	Canadian Open	Canada	600,000	(United States) Curtis Strange (10)	46	
Jul 12	Anheuser-Busch Golf Classic	Virginia	612,000	(United States) Mark McCumber (5)	38	
Jul 19	Hardee's Golf Classic	Illinois	500,000	(United States) Kenny Knox (2)	16	
Jul 19	The Open Championship	Scotland	£650,000	(England) Nick Faldo (2)	100	Major championship (Note: Unofficial money event at the time, but retrospectively counted as an official win.)
Jul 26	Buick Open	Michigan	600,000	(United States) Robert Wrenn (1)	42	
Aug 2	Federal Express St. Jude Classic	Tennessee	725,000	(United States) Curtis Strange (11)	46	
Aug 9	PGA Championship	Florida	900,000	(United States) Larry Nelson (8)	100	Major championship
Aug 16	The International	Colorado	1,115,280	(United States) John Cook (3)	52	
Aug 23	Beatrice Western Open	Illinois	800,000	(United States) D. A. Weibring (2)	40	
Aug 30	NEC World Series of Golf	Ohio	800,000	(United States) Curtis Strange (12)	58	Limited-field event
Aug 30	Provident Classic	Tennessee	450,000	(United States) John Inman (1)	10	Alternate event
Sep 6	B.C. Open	New York	400,000	(United States) Joey Sindelar (3)	22	
Sep 13	Bank of Boston Classic	Massachusetts	500,000	(United States) Sam Randolph (1)	32	
Sep 21	Greater Milwaukee Open	Wisconsin	600,000	(United States) Gary Hallberg (2)	24	
Sep 27	Southwest Golf Classic	Texas	400,000	(United States) Steve Pate (1)	22	
Oct 4	Southern Open	Georgia	400,000	(Scotland) Ken Brown (1)	24	
Oct 11	Pensacola Open	Florida	300,000	(United States) Doug Tewell (4)	18	
Oct 18	Walt Disney World/Oldsmobile Classic	Florida	600,000	(United States) Larry Nelson (9)	48	
Oct 25	Seiko Tucson Open	Arizona	600,000	(United States) Mike Reid (1)	48	
Nov 1	Nabisco Championship	Texas	2,000,000	(United States) Tom Watson (37)	58	
Nov 1	Centel Classic	Florida	500,000	(United States) Keith Clearwater (2)	10	Alternate event

=== Unofficial events ===
The following events were sanctioned by the PGA Tour, but did not carry official money, nor were wins official.

Date	Tournament	Location	Purse ($)	Winner(s)	OWGR points	Notes
Sep 27	Ryder Cup	England	n/a	Team Europe	n/a	Team event
Nov 8	Kirin Cup	Japan	950,000	Team USA	n/a	Team event
Nov 8	Kirin Cup Individual Trophy	Japan	n/a	(United States) Tom Kite	n/a	
Nov 14	Isuzu Kapalua International	Hawaii	600,000	(United States) Andy Bean	36	
Nov 21	World Cup	Hawaii	750,000	(Wales) David Llewellyn and (Wales) Ian Woosnam	n/a	Team event
Nov 21	World Cup Individual Trophy	Hawaii	750,000	(Wales) Ian Woosnam	n/a	
Nov 29	Skins Game	California	450,000	(United States) Lee Trevino	n/a	Limited-field event
Dec 6	JCPenney Classic	Florida	650,000	(Australia) Jane Crafter and (United States) Steve Jones	n/a	Team event
Dec 13	Chrysler Team Championship	Florida	600,000	(United States) Mike Hulbert and (United States) Bob Tway	n/a	Team event

== Money list ==
The money list was based on prize money won during the season, calculated in U.S. dollars.

Position	Player	Prize money ($)
1	(United States) Curtis Strange	925,941
2	(United States) Paul Azinger	822,481
3	(United States) Ben Crenshaw	638,194
4	(United States) Scott Simpson	621,032
5	(United States) Tom Watson	616,351
6	(United States) Larry Mize	561,407
7	(Australia) Greg Norman	535,450
8	(United States) Tom Kite	525,516
9	(United States) Chip Beck	523,003
10	(United States) Mark Calcavecchia	522,398

== Awards ==
Award	Winner	Ref.
PGA Player of the Year	(United States) Paul Azinger	
Rookie of the Year	(United States) Keith Clearwater	
Scoring leader (PGA Tour – Byron Nelson Award)	(South Africa) David Frost	
Scoring leader (PGA – Vardon Trophy)	(United States) Dan Pohl	

== See also ==
- 1987 Senior PGA Tour
