= 1993 PGA Tour =

Golf tour season

1993 PGA Tour season
- Duration: January 7, 1993 – October 31, 1993
- Number of official events: 43
- Most wins: (Zimbabwe) Nick Price (4)
- Money list: (Zimbabwe) Nick Price
- PGA Tour Player of the Year: (Zimbabwe) Nick Price
- PGA Player of the Year: (Zimbabwe) Nick Price
- Rookie of the Year: (Fiji) Vijay Singh

The 1993 PGA Tour was the 78th season of the PGA Tour, the main professional golf tour in the United States. It was also the 25th season since separating from the PGA of America.

== Schedule ==
The following table lists official events during the 1993 season.

Date	Tournament	Location	Purse (US$)	Winner (Note: The number in parentheses after each winner's name is the number of PGA Tour events they had won up to and including that tournament. This information is only shown for PGA Tour members.)	OWGR points	Notes
Jan 10	Infiniti Tournament of Champions	California	800,000	(United States) Davis Love III (7)	52	Winners-only event
Jan 17	United Airlines Hawaiian Open	Hawaii	1,200,000	(United States) Howard Twitty (3)	48	
Jan 24	Northern Telecom Open	Arizona	1,100,000	(United States) Larry Mize (3)	34	
Jan 31	Phoenix Open	Arizona	1,000,000	(United States) Lee Janzen (2)	44	
Feb 7	AT&T Pebble Beach National Pro-Am	California	1,250,000	(Australia) Brett Ogle (1)	48	Pro-Am
Feb 14	Bob Hope Chrysler Classic	California	1,100,000	(United States) Tom Kite (18)	46	Pro-Am
Feb 21	Buick Invitational of California	California	1,000,000	(United States) Phil Mickelson (2)	36	
Feb 28	Nissan Los Angeles Open	California	1,000,000	(United States) Tom Kite (19)	34	
Mar 7	Doral-Ryder Open	Florida	1,400,000	(Australia) Greg Norman (12)	64	
Mar 14	Honda Classic	Florida	1,100,000	(United States) Fred Couples (10)	38	
Mar 21	Nestle Invitational	Florida	1,000,000	(United States) Ben Crenshaw (17)	68	Invitational
Mar 28	The Players Championship	Florida	2,500,000	(Zimbabwe) Nick Price (6)	80	Flagship event
Apr 4	Freeport-McMoRan Golf Classic	Louisiana	1,000,000	(United States) Mike Standly (1)	48	
Apr 11	Masters Tournament	Georgia	1,700,000	(Germany) Bernhard Langer (3)	100	Major championship
Apr 11	Deposit Guaranty Golf Classic	Mississippi	300,000	(United States) Greg Kraft (n/a)	20	Alternate event (Note: Official money; unofficial win.)
Apr 18	MCI Heritage Golf Classic	South Carolina	1,350,000	(United States) David Edwards (4)	54	Invitational
Apr 25	KMart Greater Greensboro Open	North Carolina	1,500,000	(United States) Rocco Mediate (2)	50	
May 2	Shell Houston Open	Texas	1,300,000	(United States) Jim McGovern (1)	28	
May 9	BellSouth Classic	Georgia	1,200,000	(United States) Nolan Henke (3)	42	
May 16	GTE Byron Nelson Golf Classic	Texas	1,200,000	(United States) Scott Simpson (6)	54	
May 23	Kemper Open	Maryland	1,300,000	(New Zealand) Grant Waite (1)	30	
May 30	Southwestern Bell Colonial	Texas	1,300,000	(South Africa) Fulton Allem (2)	56	Invitational
Jun 6	Memorial Tournament	Ohio	1,400,000	(United States) Paul Azinger (9)	60	Invitational
Jun 13	Buick Classic	New York	1,000,000	(Fiji) Vijay Singh (1)	52	
Jun 20	U.S. Open	New Jersey	1,600,000	(United States) Lee Janzen (3)	100	Major championship
Jun 27	Canon Greater Hartford Open	Connecticut	1,000,000	(Zimbabwe) Nick Price (7)	42	
Jul 4	Sprint Western Open	Illinois	1,200,000	(Zimbabwe) Nick Price (8)	50	
Jul 11	Anheuser-Busch Golf Classic	Virginia	1,100,000	(United States) Jim Gallagher Jr. (2)	24	
Jul 18	The Open Championship	England	£1,000,000	(Australia) Greg Norman (13)	100	Major championship (Note: Unofficial money event at the time, but retrospectively counted as an official win.)
Jul 25	New England Classic	Massachusetts	1,000,000	(United States) Paul Azinger (10)	36	
Aug 1	Federal Express St. Jude Classic	Tennessee	1,100,000	(Zimbabwe) Nick Price (9)	46	
Aug 8	Buick Open	Michigan	1,000,000	(United States) Larry Mize (4)	52	
Aug 15	PGA Championship	Ohio	1,700,000	(United States) Paul Azinger (11)	100	Major championship
Aug 22	The International	Colorado	1,300,000	(United States) Phil Mickelson (3)	44	
Aug 29	NEC World Series of Golf	Ohio	2,000,000	(South Africa) Fulton Allem (3)	54	Limited-field event
Sep 5	Greater Milwaukee Open	Wisconsin	1,000,000	(United States) Billy Mayfair (1)	42	
Sep 12	Canadian Open	Canada	1,000,000	(South Africa) David Frost (7)	48	
Sep 19	Hardee's Golf Classic	Illinois	1,000,000	(South Africa) David Frost (8)	32	
Sep 26	B.C. Open	New York	800,000	(United States) Blaine McCallister (5)	22	
Oct 1	Buick Southern Open	Georgia	700,000	(United States) John Inman (2)	24	
Oct 10	Walt Disney World/Oldsmobile Classic	Florida	1,100,000	(United States) Jeff Maggert (1)	44	
Oct 17	H.E.B. Texas Open	Texas	1,000,000	(United States) Jay Haas (9)	38	
Oct 24	Las Vegas Invitational	Nevada	1,400,000	(United States) Davis Love III (8)	42	
Oct 31	The Tour Championship	California	3,000,000	(United States) Jim Gallagher Jr. (3)	56	Tour Championship

=== Unofficial events ===
The following events were sanctioned by the PGA Tour, but did not carry official money, nor were wins official.

Date	Tournament	Location	Purse ($)	Winner(s)	OWGR points	Notes
Sep 26	Ryder Cup	England	n/a	Team USA	n/a	Team event
Nov 7	Lincoln-Mercury Kapalua International	Hawaii	1,000,000	(United States) Fred Couples	38	
Nov 17	PGA Grand Slam of Golf	California	1,000,000	(Australia) Greg Norman	n/a	Limited-field event
Nov 14	World Cup of Golf	Florida	1,200,000	(United States) Fred Couples and (United States) Davis Love III	n/a	Team event
Nov 14	World Cup of Golf Individual Trophy	Florida	1,200,000	(Germany) Bernhard Langer	n/a	
Nov 21	Franklin Funds Shark Shootout	California	1,100,000	(Australia) Steve Elkington and (United States) Raymond Floyd	n/a	Team event
Nov 28	Skins Game	California	540,000	(United States) Payne Stewart	n/a	Limited-field event
Dec 4	JCPenney Classic	Florida	1,200,000	(United States) Melissa McNamara and (United States) Mike Springer	n/a	Team event

== Money list ==
The money list was based on prize money won during the season, calculated in U.S. dollars.

Position	Player	Prize money ($)
1	(Zimbabwe) Nick Price	1,478,557
2	(United States) Paul Azinger	1,458,456
3	(Australia) Greg Norman	1,359,653
4	(United States) Jim Gallagher Jr.	1,078,870
5	(South Africa) David Frost	1,030,717
6	(United States) Payne Stewart	982,875
7	(United States) Lee Janzen	932,335
8	(United States) Tom Kite	887,811
9	(South Africa) Fulton Allem	851,345
10	(United States) Fred Couples	796,579

== Awards ==
Award	Winner	Ref.
PGA Tour Player of the Year (Jack Nicklaus Trophy)	(Zimbabwe) Nick Price	
PGA Player of the Year	(Zimbabwe) Nick Price	
Rookie of the Year	(Fiji) Vijay Singh	
Scoring leader (PGA Tour – Byron Nelson Award)	(Australia) Greg Norman	
Scoring leader (PGA – Vardon Trophy)	(Zimbabwe) Nick Price	
Comeback Player of the Year	(United States) Howard Twitty	

== See also ==
- 1993 Nike Tour
- 1993 Senior PGA Tour
