= Andrew Magee =

American professional golfer

Personal information
- Full name: Andrew Donald Magee
- Nationality: United States
- Born: May 22, 1962 (age 64) Paris, France
- Height: 6 ft 0 in (1.83 m)
- Weight: 180 lb (82 kg; 13 st)
- Spouse: Susan
- Children: Lindsey, Campbell, Oliver

Career
- Sport: Golf
- College: University of Oklahoma
- Turned professional: 1984
- Current tour: Champions Tour
- Former tour: PGA Tour
- Professional wins: 6
- Highest ranking: 35 (March 28, 1999)

Number of wins by tour
- PGA Tour: 4
- Other: 2

Best results in major championships
- Masters Tournament: T7: 1991
- PGA Championship: T13: 1991
- U.S. Open: T17: 1992
- The Open Championship: T5: 1992

Andrew Donald Magee (born May 22, 1962) is an American professional golfer who played for more than 20 years on the PGA Tour.

== Early life and amateur career ==
In 1962, Magee was born in Paris, France, where his father, a Texas oil man, was working at the time. He grew up in Dallas, Texas. Magee attended the University of Oklahoma from 1981–1984. While there he was a distinguished member of the golf team, winning All-American honors three times.

== Professional career ==
In 1984, Magee turned pro. He was successful at 1984 PGA Tour Qualifying School and joined the PGA Tour in 1985.

Magee won four PGA Tour events. His first win came in 1988 at the Pensacola Open. In 1991, he won two Tour events and was awarded Golf Digest's Most Improved Golfer Award. His most recent win was at the 1994 Northern Telecom Open. His best finish in a major was T5 at the 1992 British Open. He has featured in the top 50 of the Official World Golf Rankings.

Magee is the only person in PGA Tour history to hit a hole in one on a par-4 hole during a PGA Tour event. He did this with a driver at the 332-yard 17th hole of the 2001 Phoenix Open. The ball caromed off Tom Byrum's putter on its way to the bottom of the cup. Byrum, in the group ahead, was squatting down looking over a putt.

In February 2006, Magee underwent surgery to remove a cancerous tumor from his left kidney at the Cleveland Clinic in Cleveland, Ohio. The operation was deemed successful and he was back playing on the Tour in April.

In January 2007, Magee signed on with The Golf Channel as an analyst for its new show The Approach with Callaway Golf and for the Sprint Pre-Game and Sprint Post-Game shows. Magee was also the host of the Golf Channel's 2008 season of The Big Break, which was set in Hawaii.

His last PGA Tour cut was the 2006 Southern Farm Bureau Classic. Prior to age 50, the last cut he made on a professional tour was at the Nationwide Tour's 2009 BMW Charity Pro-Am. Since reaching age 50, Magee has played in a limited number of events on the Champions Tour.

Magee is a regular contributor to the golf coverage of major tournaments on BBC Radio Five Live.

== Personal life ==
During the summer of 2006 Magee's eldest son, Campbell, caddied for him in five tour events. Campbell is a graduate of Brophy College Preparatory, where he played competitive lacrosse; Campbell later attended the University of Arizona.

Magee resides in Paradise Valley, Arizona.

== Awards and honors ==
- As a student-athlete at the University of Oklahoma, Magee earned All-American honors three times
- In 1991, Magee was selected for Golf Digest's Most Improved Golfer Award
- In 1999, Magee was bestowed with the Southern Company Citizenship Award (which now sponsors the Payne Stewart Award) for his work with charities.

== Professional wins (6) ==
=== PGA Tour wins (4) ===
No.	Date	Tournament	Winning score	Margin of victory	Runner(s)-up
1	Oct 23, 1988	Pensacola Open	−17 (70-68-67-66=271)	1 stroke	(United States) Tom Byrum, (United States) Ken Green, (United States) Bruce Lietzke
2	Mar 17, 1991	Nestle Invitational	−13 (68-69-66=203) (Note: Shortened to 54 holes due to weather.)	2 strokes	(United States) Tom Sieckmann
3	Oct 13, 1991	Las Vegas Invitational	−31 (69-65-67-62-66=329)	Playoff	(United States) D. A. Weibring
4	Jan 23, 1994	Northern Telecom Open	−18 (69-67-67-67=270)	2 strokes	(United States) Jay Don Blake, (United States) Loren Roberts, (Fiji) Vijay Singh, (United States) Steve Stricker

PGA Tour playoff record (1–0)

No.	Year	Tournament	Opponent	Result
1	1991	Las Vegas Invitational	(United States) D. A. Weibring	Won with par on second extra hole

=== Other wins (2) ===
- 1991 Jerry Ford Invitational
- 1992 Jerry Ford Invitational

== Results in major championships ==
Tournament	1981	1982	1983	1984	1985	1986	1987	1988	1989
Masters Tournament									CUT
U.S. Open	CUT					CUT		CUT	
The Open Championship								CUT	
PGA Championship						CUT		69	CUT

Tournament	1990	1991	1992	1993	1994	1995	1996	1997	1998	1999	2000
Masters Tournament		T7	T19	T31	T41				T31	T36	
U.S. Open	CUT	CUT	T17			CUT			CUT	CUT	CUT
The Open Championship		T57	T5	T39	CUT			T36	CUT	CUT	
PGA Championship	T45	T13	T56	T51	T47			75	T21	T54	CUT

Top 10
Did not play

CUT = missed the half-way cut
"T" = tied

=== Summary ===
Tournament	Wins	2nd	3rd	Top-5	Top-10	Top-25	Events	Cuts made
Masters Tournament	0	0	0	0	1	2	7	6
U.S. Open	0	0	0	0	0	1	10	1
The Open Championship	0	0	0	1	1	1	8	4
PGA Championship	0	0	0	0	0	2	12	9
Totals	0	0	0	1	2	6	37	20

- Most consecutive cuts made – 10 (1991 Open Championship – 1994 Masters)
- Longest streak of top-10s – 1 (twice)

== Results in The Players Championship ==
Tournament	1985	1986	1987	1988	1989	1990	1991	1992	1993	1994	1995	1996	1997	1998	1999	2000	2001	2002	2003
The Players Championship	CUT	CUT	CUT	CUT	CUT	T36	CUT	T17	T20	T45	T37	CUT	T53	CUT	CUT	CUT	CUT		CUT

Did not play

CUT = missed the halfway cut
"T" indicates a tie for a place

== Results in World Golf Championships ==
Tournament	1999	2000
Match Play	2	R64
Championship		
Invitational		

Top 10
Did not play

QF, R16, R32, R64 = Round in which player lost in match play

== See also ==
- 1984 PGA Tour Qualifying School graduates
