= 1992 Open Championship =

Coordinates: 56.043°N 2.823°W

Tournament information
- Dates: 16–19 July 1992
- Location: Gullane, Scotland
- Course: Muirfield
- Tour(s): European Tour; PGA Tour

Statistics
- Par: 71
- Length: 6,970 yards (6,373 m)
- Field: 156 players, 75 after cut
- Cut: 143 (+1)
- Prize fund: £1,000,000 €1,336,650 $1,900,000
- Winner's share: £95,000 €133,000 $154,000

Champion
- (England) Nick Faldo
- 272 (−12)

Location in Scotland
Location in East Lothian, Scotland

The 1992 Open Championship was a men's major golf championship and the 121st Open Championship, held from 16 to 19 July at Muirfield Golf Links in Gullane, Scotland. Nick Faldo won his third Open Championship and fifth major title by one stroke over runner-up John Cook. It was Faldo's second win at Muirfield, where he won his first Claret Jug in 1987. Daren Lee of England was the only amateur to make the cut; he earned the silver medal as low amateur and finished in a tie for 68th place.

== Course ==
Hole	1	2	3	4	5	6	7	8	9	Out	10	11	12	13	14	15	16	17	18	In	Total
Yards	447	351	379	180	559	469	185	444	504	3,518	475	385	381	159	449	417	188	550	448	3,452	6,970
Par	4	4	4	3	5	4	3	4	5	36	4	4	4	3	4	4	3	5	4	35	71

Lengths of the course for previous Opens (since 1950):

- 1987: 6,963 yards (6,367 m), par 71
- 1980: 6,926 yards (6,333 m), par 71
- 1972: 6,892 yards (6,302 m), par 71
- 1966: 6,887 yards (6,297 m), par 71
- 1959: 6,806 yards (6,223 m), par 72

== Round summaries ==
=== First round ===
Thursday, 16 July 1992

Place	Player	Score	To par
T1	(United States) Raymond Floyd	64	−7
T1	(United States) Steve Pate	64	−7
T3	(Scotland) Gordon Brand Jnr	65	−6
T3	(Wales) Ian Woosnam	65	−6
T5	(United States) John Cook	66	−5
T5	(South Africa) Ernie Els	66	−5
T5	(England) Nick Faldo	66	−5
T5	(United States) Lee Janzen	66	−5
T9	(Sweden) Per-Ulrik Johansson	67	−4
T9	(United States) Andrew Magee	67	−4
T9	(United States) Rocco Mediate	67	−4
T9	(Australia) Craig Parry	67	−4
T9	(Italy) Costantino Rocca	67	−4
T9	(United States) Orrin Vincent III	67	−4

=== Second round ===
Friday, 17 July 1992

Place	Player	Score	To par
1	(England) Nick Faldo	66-64=130	−12
T2	(Scotland) Gordon Brand Jnr	65-68=133	−9
T2	(United States) John Cook	66-67=133	−9
4	(United States) Steve Pate	64-70=134	−8
T5	(South Africa) Ernie Els	66-69=135	−7
T5	(United States) Raymond Floyd	64-71=135	−7
T5	(United States) Donnie Hammond	70-65=135	−7
T8	(Spain) José María Olazábal	70-67=137	−5
T8	(United States) Tom Purtzer	68-69=137	−5
T8	(United States) Larry Rinker	69-68=137	−5

Amateurs: Lee (-2), Pullan (+3), Voges (+8), Welch (+8), Wolstenholme (+11).

=== Third round ===
Saturday, 18 July 1992

Place	Player	Score	To par
1	(England) Nick Faldo	66-64-69=199	−14
T2	(United States) Steve Pate	64-70-69=203	−10
T2	(United States) John Cook	66-67-70=203	−10
T4	(United States) Donnie Hammond	70-65-70=205	−8
T4	(South Africa) Ernie Els	66-69-70=205	−8
T4	(Scotland) Gordon Brand Jnr	65-68-72=205	−8
T7	(United States) Chip Beck	71-68-67=206	−7
T7	(Spain) José María Olazábal	70-67-69=206	−7
9	(United States) Larry Rinker	69-68-70=207	−6
T10	(England) Malcolm MacKenzie	71-67-70=208	−5
T10	(Sweden) Robert Karlsson	70-68-70=208	−5
T10	(Scotland) Sandy Lyle	68-70-70=208	−5
T10	(Wales) Ian Woosnam	65-73-70=208	−5
T10	(United States) Raymond Floyd	64-71-73=208	−5

=== Final round ===
Sunday, 19 July 1992

Place	Player	Score	To par	Money (£)
1	(England) Nick Faldo	66-64-69-73=272	−12	95,000
2	(United States) John Cook	66-67-70-70=273	−11	75,000
3	(Spain) José María Olazábal	70-67-69-68=274	−10	64,000
4	(United States) Steve Pate	64-70-69-73=276	−8	53,000
T5	(United States) Andrew Magee	67-72-70-70=279	−5	30,071
T5	(Sweden) Robert Karlsson	70-68-70-71=279	−5	30,071
T5	(England) Malcolm MacKenzie	71-67-70-71=279	−5	30,071
T5	(Wales) Ian Woosnam	65-73-70-71=279	−5	30,071
T5	(South Africa) Ernie Els	66-69-70-74=279	−5	30,071
T5	(United States) Donnie Hammond	70-65-70-74=279	−5	30,071
T5	(Scotland) Gordon Brand Jnr	65-68-72-74=279	−5	30,071

Amateurs: Lee (+9)

==== Scorecard ====
Final round

Hole	1	2	3	4	5	6	7	8	9	10	11	12	13	14	15	16	17	18
Par	4	4	4	3	5	4	3	4	5	4	4	4	3	4	4	3	5	4
(England) Faldo	−13	−13	−13	−13	−13	−13	−13	−13	−13	−13	−12	−12	−11	−10	−11	−11	−12	−12
(United States) Cook	−9	−9	−10	−10	−12	−12	−11	−11	−9	−9	−9	−10	−10	−10	−11	−12	−12	−11
(Spain) Olazábal	−6	−7	−7	−6	−6	−6	−6	−6	−7	−7	−8	−9	−9	−9	−9	−9	−10	−10
(United States) Pate	−10	−9	−10	−9	−10	−11	−11	−11	−10	−10	−10	−10	−10	−9	−7	-7	-8	-8

Cumulative tournament scores, relative to par
