= 1993 PGA Championship =

Coordinates: 41.652°N 83.651°W

Tournament information
- Dates: August 12–15, 1993
- Location: Toledo, Ohio
- Course(s): Inverness Club
- Organized by: PGA of America
- Tour(s): PGA Tour

Statistics
- Par: 71
- Length: 7,025 yards (6,424 m)
- Field: 151 players, 74 after cut
- Cut: 143 (+1)
- Prize fund: $1.7 million
- Winner's share: $300,000

Champion
- (United States) Paul Azinger
- 272 (−12), playoff

Location in the United States

The 1993 PGA Championship was the 75th PGA Championship, held August 12–15 at Inverness Club in Toledo, Ohio.

Paul Azinger won his only major title on the second hole of a sudden-death playoff with Greg Norman. Azinger birdied four of the last seven holes to get into the playoff. Norman, the 1993 Open champion, joined Craig Wood as the only players to lose playoffs in all four major championships. It was the fifth playoff under the sudden-death format at the PGA Championship, first used in 1977.

Norman was attempting to become the first player to win the Open Championship and PGA Championship in the same year since Walter Hagen in 1924. It was accomplished the following year by Nick Price, and later by Tiger Woods in 2000 and 2006, Pádraig Harrington in 2008 and Rory McIlroy in 2014.

It was the sixth major championship at Inverness, which hosted the PGA Championship in 1986 and four U.S. Opens (1920, 1931, 1957, and 1979). Norman was also the British Open champion and PGA runner-up in 1986, when Bob Tway holed out from a greenside bunker at the 72nd hole for birdie. Forced to sink his chip to tie, Norman ran it ten feet (3.0 m) past and bogeyed.

Tom Watson, age 43, was in search of a PGA Championship win to complete a career grand slam. He was a stroke behind after 54 holes, but bogeyed three of the first five holes and finished four strokes back in fifth. Watson later had top ten finishes in 1994 and 2000, but never won the title.

== Course layout ==
Hole	1	2	3	4	5	6	7	8	9	Out	10	11	12	13	14	15	16	17	18	In	Total
Yards	398	385	194	466	409	210	452	554	420	3,488	363	378	170	515	448	465	409	435	354	3,537	7,025
Par	4	4	3	4	4	3	4	5	4	35	4	4	3	5	4	4	4	4	4	36	71

Lengths of the course for previous major championships:

- 6,982 yards (6,384 m), par 71 - 1986 PGA Championship
- 6,982 yards (6,384 m), par 71 - 1979 U.S. Open
- 6,919 yards (6,327 m), par 71 - 1957 U.S. Open
- 6,529 yards (5,970 m), par 71 - 1931 U.S. Open
- 6,569 yards (6,007 m), par 71 - 1920 U.S. Open

== Round summaries ==
=== First round ===
Thursday, August 12, 1993

Place	Player	Score	To par
1	(United States) Scott Simpson	64	−7
2	(United States) Lanny Wadkins	65	−6
T3	(United States) Dudley Hart	66	−5
T3	(Canada) Richard Zokol	66	−5
T5	(Australia) Steve Elkington	67	−4
T5	(United States) Dan Forsman	67	−4
T5	(United States) Robert Gamez	67	−4
T5	(United States) Mike Hulbert	67	−4
T5	(England) Barry Lane	67	−4
T5	(United States) Mark McCumber	67	−4
T5	(United States) Phil Mickelson	67	−4
T5	(United States) Loren Roberts	67	−4
T5	(Argentina) Eduardo Romero	67	−4

=== Second round ===
Friday, August 13, 1993

Place	Player	Score	To par
1	(Fiji) Vijay Singh	68-63=131	−11
T2	(Australia) Steve Elkington	67-66=133	−9
T2	(United States) Lanny Wadkins	65-68=133	−9
T4	(United States) Dudley Hart	66-68=134	−8
T4	(Argentina) Eduardo Romero	67-67=134	−8
T4	(United States) Scott Simpson	64-70=134	−8
T4	(United States) Tom Watson	69-65=134	−8
T8	(United States) Paul Azinger	69-66=135	−7
T8	(United States) Bob Estes	69-66=135	−7
T8	(New Zealand) Frank Nobilo	69-66=135	−7

=== Third round ===
Saturday, August 14, 1993

Place	Player	Score	To par
1	(Australia) Greg Norman	68-68-67=203	−10
T2	(United States) Paul Azinger	69-66-69=204	−9
T2	(United States) Bob Estes	69-66-69=204	−9
T2	(United States) Hale Irwin	68-69-67=204	−9
T2	(Fiji) Vijay Singh	68-63-73=204	−9
T2	(United States) Lanny Wadkins	65-68-71=204	−9
T2	(United States) Tom Watson	69-65-70=204	−9
T8	(England) Nick Faldo	68-68-69=205	−8
T8	(United States) Brad Faxon	70-70-65=205	−8
T8	(United States) Dudley Hart	66-68-71=205	−8
T8	(United States) Scott Simpson	64-70-71=205	−8

=== Final round ===
Sunday, August 15, 1993

Place	Player	Score	To par	Money ($)
T1	(United States) Paul Azinger	69-66-69-68=272	−12	Playoff
T1	(Australia) Greg Norman	68-68-67-69=272	−12	Playoff
3	(England) Nick Faldo	68-68-69-68=273	−11	105,000
4	(Fiji) Vijay Singh	68-63-73-70=274	−10	90,000
5	(United States) Tom Watson	69-65-70-72=276	−8	75,000
T6	(United States) John Cook	72-66-68-71=277	−7	47,813
T6	(United States) Bob Estes	69-66-69-73=277	−7	47,813
T6	(United States) Dudley Hart	66-68-71-72=277	−7	47,813
T6	(United States) Nolan Henke	72-70-67-68=277	−7	47,813
T6	(United States) Scott Hoch	74-68-68-67=277	−7	47,813
T6	(United States) Hale Irwin	68-69-67-73=277	−7	47,813
T6	(United States) Phil Mickelson	67-71-69-70=277	−7	47,813
T6	(United States) Scott Simpson	64-70-71-72=277	−7	47,813

==== Scorecard ====
Birdie	Bogey	Double bogey

Final round

Hole	1	2	3	4	5	6	7	8	9	10	11	12	13	14	15	16	17	18
Par	4	4	3	4	4	3	4	5	4	4	4	3	5	4	4	4	4	4
(United States) Azinger	−9	−9	−9	−9	−8	−8	−8	−8	−8	−8	−8	−9	−10	−11	−11	−11	−12	−12
(Australia) Norman	−10	−10	−11	−11	−11	−9	−8	−9	−9	−9	−10	−10	−11	−11	−11	−12	−12	−12
(England) Faldo	−8	−8	−8	−8	−8	−8	−9	−10	−10	−10	−10	−10	−11	−11	−11	−11	−11	−11
(Fiji) Singh	−9	−8	−8	−9	−9	−9	−9	−10	−10	−10	−10	−10	−11	−11	−11	−10	−10	−10
(United States) Watson	−8	−8	−7	−8	−7	−7	−8	−8	−8	−8	−8	−8	−8	−8	−8	−8	−8	−8

Cumulative tournament scores, relative to par

==== Playoff ====
The sudden-death playoff began on the 18th hole, a 354-yard (324 m) par-4. Both narrowly missed birdie putts and tapped in for pars, and went to the next hole, the 10th at 363 yards (332 m). Again both hit the fairway and the green. Norman's downhill 20-foot (6 m) birdie attempt ended four feet (1.2 m) short, and Azinger's from seven feet (2.1 m) lipped out, and he tapped in for par. Norman's attempt to save par also rimmed out, and the playoff was over.

Place	Player	Score	To par	Money ($)
1	(United States) Paul Azinger	4-4	E	300,000
2	(Australia) Greg Norman	4-x	+1	155,000

- Sudden-death playoff was played on holes 18 and 10, both par fours.
