= Paul Azinger =

American professional golfer (born 1960)

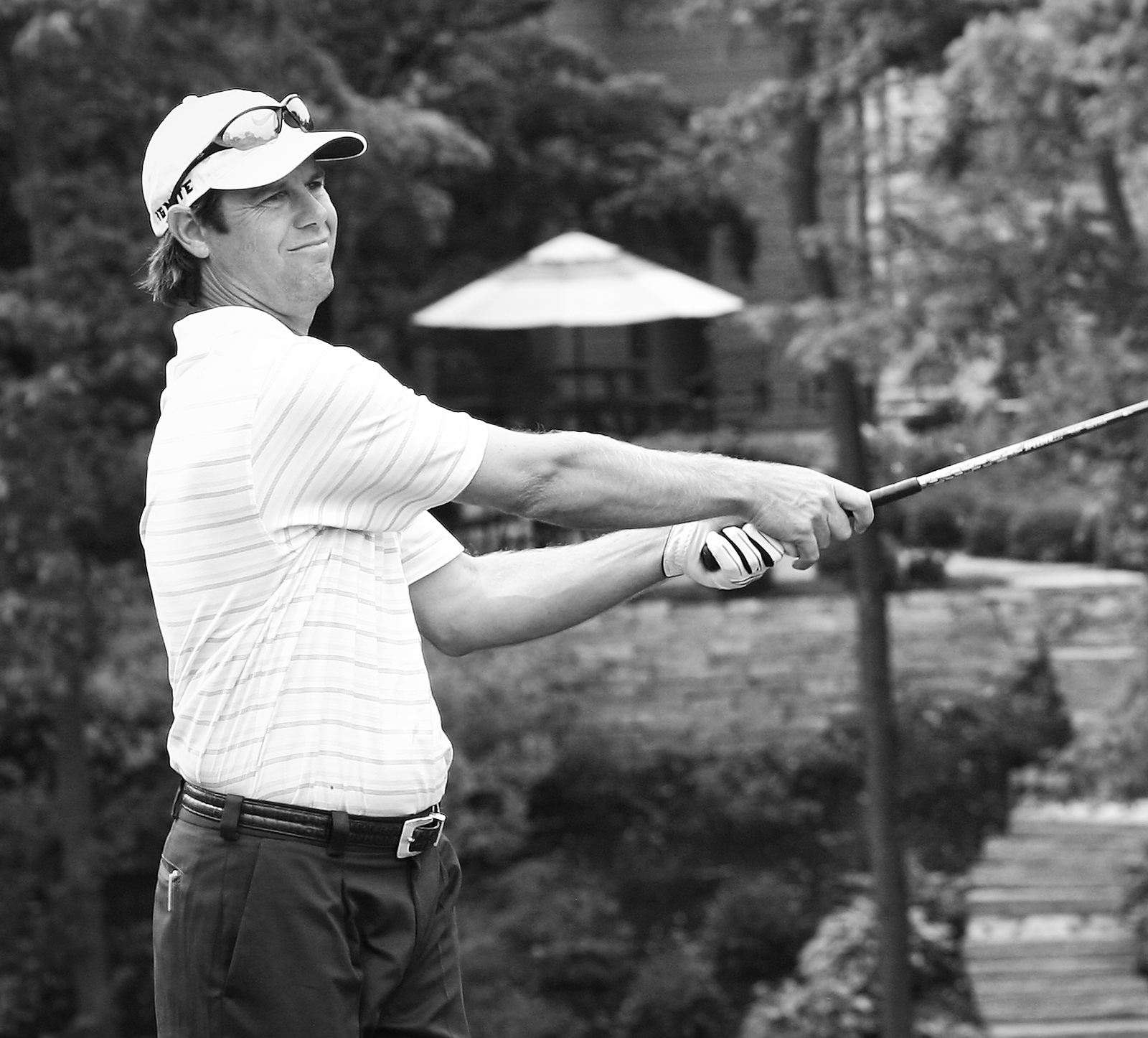
- Azinger in 2005

Personal information
- Full name: Paul William Azinger
- Nickname: Zinger
- Nationality: United States
- Born: January 6, 1960 (age 66) Holyoke, Massachusetts, U.S.
- Height: 6 ft 2 in (1.88 m)
- Weight: 175 lb (79 kg; 12 st 7 lb)

Career
- Sport: Golf
- College: Brevard Community College; Florida State University
- Turned professional: 1981
- Former tours: PGA Tour; Champions Tour
- Professional wins: 16
- Highest ranking: 4 (August 22, 1993)

Number of wins by tour
- PGA Tour: 12
- European Tour: 2
- Other: 2

Best results in major championships (wins: 1)
- Masters Tournament: 5th: 1998
- PGA Championship: Won: 1993
- U.S. Open: T3: 1993
- The Open Championship: T2: 1987

Achievements and awards
- PGA Player of the Year: 1987
- PGA Tour Comeback Player of the Year: 2000
- Payne Stewart Award: 2025

Paul William Azinger (born January 6, 1960) is an American professional golfer and TV golf analyst. He won 12 times on the PGA Tour, including one major championship, the 1993 PGA Championship. He spent almost 300 weeks in the top-10 of the Official World Golf Ranking between 1988 and 1994.

== Early life ==
Azinger was born in Holyoke, Massachusetts; his father Ralph (1930–2013) was a navigator in the U.S. Air Force and later a businessman. He started in golf at age five. After Ralph retired as a lieutenant colonel in 1972, he opened a marina, and Paul spent his summer pumping gas and painting boats.

The family moved to Sarasota, Florida, where he attended and graduated from Sarasota High School.

== Amateur career ==
Azinger attended Brevard Community College in the late 1970s. While there, he found more time to practice his swing, playing on the team as a walk-on, and landed a summer job at the Bay Hill Golf Academy in Orlando, which allowed him more practice time. Practice earned him more opportunity, in the form of a scholarship to Florida State University in Tallahassee.

== Professional career ==
Azinger turned professional in 1981. During his early years, Azinger collected meager earnings. He and his wife, Toni, bought a used motor home, a 1983 Vogue, and drove from tournament to tournament. Azinger had a breakout year in 1987, when he won three times on the PGA Tour and had a second-place finish in the Open Championship.

Azinger won eleven tournaments on the PGA Tour in seven seasons from 1987 to 1993, climaxing in his one major title, the 1993 PGA Championship at Inverness, which he won in a sudden-death playoff against Greg Norman.

Azinger finished one shot behind Nick Faldo at the 1987 Open Championship at Muirfield after making bogey at both the 71st and 72nd holes. Azinger was bidding to become only the fourth golfer since 1945 to win the Open Championship at the first attempt and said that he was "heartbroken" to leave Muirfield without the Claret Jug trophy.

At the 1991 Ryder Cup, Azinger was involved in a controversial episode with Seve Ballesteros, with whom he had a fierce rivalry. Azinger and American teammate Chip Beck were using balls of different compressions off the tee on multiple holes, in violation of an agreement between the Cup captains. Azinger initially denied that the Americans had engaged in this practice, but admitted to it once he realized that there would be no penalty assessed.

In December 1993, Azinger was diagnosed with non-Hodgkin lymphoma in his right shoulder. His treatment included six months of chemotherapy and five weeks of radiation in California. He wrote a book called Zinger about his battle with the disease and was the recipient of the GWAA Ben Hogan Award in 1995, given to the individual who has continued to be active in golf despite physical handicap or serious illness. In 2000, he won his first tournament in seven seasons at the Sony Open in Hawaii.

Azinger was the U.S. Ryder Cup captain for the 2008 at Valhalla Golf Club in Louisville, Kentucky. He led the team to its first victory over the European squad since 1999. The team's victory was largely credited to his innovative strategy. This strategy is outlined in his book, Cracking the Code: The Winning Ryder Cup Strategy: Make it Work for You, which was released in May 2010. The book was co-authored with Ron Braund, a corporate team builder and psychologist, who consulted Azinger throughout the Ryder Cup.

Azinger made his Champions Tour debut at The ACE Group Classic in February 2010. He played four events that year and none since.

=== Broadcasting career ===
Azinger first worked in television in 1995 while recovering from chemotherapy. Azinger was recruited by lead NBC analyst Johnny Miller to join the broadcast team as an on-course reporter, a stint which included reporting on the singles match at the 1995 Ryder Cup between Tom Lehman and Azinger's former Ryder Cup rival Seve Ballesteros, who was playing in his final Ryder Cup.

After returning to the PGA Tour for several more successful playing years, Azinger returned to broadcasting on a full-time basis.

From 2005 to 2015, Azinger worked as lead analyst for ESPN and ABC Sports' golf coverage. He initially shared analyst duties with his former Ryder Cup and Open Championship rival Nick Faldo. Azinger and Faldo, along with host Mike Tirico, formed a broadcast team that was met with positive critical acclaim. Faldo left for rival CBS after the 2006 season; since then, Azinger worked alone with Tirico. However, when Faldo and Azinger were opposing captains at the 2008 Ryder Cup, Azinger's colleague Andy North filled in for him. Faldo and Azinger have also reunited as analysts on two occasions. The first reunion was at the 2007 Open Championship (for ABC) and the second was at the 2009 Presidents Cup (for the Golf Channel).

After ESPN/ABC lost its rights to both the U.S. Open and Open Championship to Fox and NBC, Azinger joined Fox Sports as its head golf analyst in 2016, replacing Greg Norman.

In October 2018, NBC Sports and Golf Channel named Azinger their lead golf analyst, succeeding the retiring Johnny Miller – who had originally helped give Azinger his start in broadcasting during his recovery from cancer in 1995. After Miller ended his NBC career at the 2019 Phoenix Open, Azinger became NBC’s lead analyst during the Southern Swing in March 2019. He remained with Fox for the U.S. Open, U.S Women's Open, and U.S. Amateur for the 2019 season alongside his NBC duties, until those championships returned to NBC, where Azinger had also ended up at, in 2020.

== Personal life ==
Azinger is a Christian. He and his wife Toni met at FSU and have been married since 1982. They have two daughters, Sarah Jean Collins and Josie Azinger Mark, and currently live in Bradenton, Florida.

Azinger gave the eulogy at the memorial service for his friend Payne Stewart, who was killed in a plane crash in 1999. His two managers and close friends, Robert Fraley and Van Ardan, also died in the crash.

Politically conservative, Azinger refused an invitation to the White House for the winning 1993 Ryder Cup team due to what he saw as draft dodging on the part of President Bill Clinton. He was however persuaded to attend and said that the visit "was just wonderful".

Azinger is an avid poker player and competed in the main event at both the 2006 World Series of Poker and the 2008 World Series of Poker. He is an avid foosball player, and often seeks places to play foosball while traveling.

Azinger threw out the ceremonial first pitch at the Tampa Bay Rays' second ever playoff game on October 3, 2008. He recently launched a new application for the iPad, iPhone, and iPod Touch called Golfplan.

Azinger was awarded the Payne Stewart Award in 2025.

== Professional wins (16) ==
=== PGA Tour wins (12) ===
Legend
Major championships (1)
Tour Championships (1)
Other PGA Tour (10)

No.	Date	Tournament	Winning score	To par	Margin of victory	Runner(s)-up
1	Jan 25, 1987	Phoenix Open	67-69-65-67=268	−16	1 stroke	(United States) Hal Sutton
2	May 3, 1987	Panasonic Las Vegas Invitational	68-72-67-64=271 (Note: Shortened to 72 holes due to weather.)	−17	1 stroke	(United States) Hal Sutton
3	Jun 28, 1987	Canon Sammy Davis Jr.-Greater Hartford Open	69-65-63-72=269	−15	1 stroke	(United States) Dan Forsman, (United States) Wayne Levi
4	Mar 20, 1988	Hertz Bay Hill Classic	66-66-73-66=271	−13	5 strokes	(United States) Tom Kite
5	Jul 9, 1989	Canon Greater Hartford Open (2)	65-70-67-65=267	−17	1 stroke	(United States) Wayne Levi
6	Jan 7, 1990	MONY Tournament of Champions	66-68-69-69=272	−16	1 stroke	(Australia) Ian Baker-Finch
7	Feb 3, 1991	AT&T Pebble Beach National Pro-Am	67-67-73-67=274	−14	4 strokes	(United States) Brian Claar, (United States) Corey Pavin
8	Nov 1, 1992	The Tour Championship	70-66-69-71=276	−8	3 strokes	(United States) Lee Janzen, (United States) Corey Pavin
9	Jun 6, 1993	Memorial Tournament	68-69-68-69=274	−14	1 stroke	(United States) Corey Pavin
10	Jul 25, 1993	New England Classic	67-69-64-68=268	−16	4 strokes	(United States) Jay Delsing, (United States) Bruce Fleisher
11	Aug 15, 1993	PGA Championship	69-66-69-68=272	−12	Playoff	(Australia) Greg Norman
12	Jan 16, 2000	Sony Open in Hawaii	63-65-68-65=261	−19	7 strokes	(Australia) Stuart Appleby

PGA Tour playoff record (1–2)

No.	Year	Tournament	Opponent(s)	Result
1	1989	Bob Hope Chrysler Classic	(United States) Steve Jones, (Scotland) Sandy Lyle	Jones won with birdie on first extra hole
2	1990	Doral-Ryder Open	(United States) Mark Calcavecchia, (Australia) Greg Norman, (United States) Tim Simpson	Norman won with eagle on first extra hole
3	1993	PGA Championship	(Australia) Greg Norman	Won with par on second extra hole

=== European Tour wins (3) ===
Legend
Major championships (1)
Other European Tour (2)

No.	Date	Tournament	Winning score	Margin of victory	Runner(s)-up
1	Sep 23, 1990	BMW International Open	−11 (63-73-73-68=277)	Playoff	(Northern Ireland) David Feherty
2	Aug 9, 1992	BMW International Open (2)	−22 (66-67-66-67=266)	Playoff	(United States) Glen Day, (Sweden) Anders Forsbrand, (England) Mark James, (Germany) Bernhard Langer
3	Aug 15, 1993	PGA Championship	−12 (69-66-69-68=272)	Playoff	(Australia) Greg Norman

European Tour playoff record (3–0)

No.	Year	Tournament	Opponent(s)	Result
1	1990	BMW International Open	(Northern Ireland) David Feherty	Won with birdie on first extra hole
2	1992	BMW International Open	(United States) Glen Day, (Sweden) Anders Forsbrand, (England) Mark James, (Germany) Bernhard Langer	Won with birdie on first extra hole
3	1993	PGA Championship	(Australia) Greg Norman	Won with par on second extra hole

=== Other wins (2) ===
No.	Date	Tournament	Winning score	Margin of victory	Runners-up
1	Aug 23, 1988	Fred Meyer Challenge (with (United States) Bob Tway)	−19 (62-63=125)	1 stroke	(United States) Andy Bean and (United States) Raymond Floyd
2	Aug 20, 1991	Fred Meyer Challenge (2) (with (United States) Ben Crenshaw)	−19 (63-62=125)	Playoff	(United States) Mark Calcavecchia and (United States) Bob Gilder, (United States) Fred Couples and (United States) Raymond Floyd

Other playoff record (1–3)

No.	Year	Tournament	Opponent(s)	Result
1	1985	Magnolia Classic	(United States) Jim Gallagher Jr.	Lost to birdie on first extra hole
2	1991	Fred Meyer Challenge (with (United States) Ben Crenshaw)	(United States) Mark Calcavecchia and (United States) Bob Gilder, (United States) Fred Couples and (United States) Raymond Floyd	Won with birdie on second extra hole Calcavecchia/Gilder eliminated by par on first hole
3	1995	Fred Meyer Challenge (with (United States) Payne Stewart)	(United States) Brad Faxon and (Australia) Greg Norman	Lost to birdie on first extra hole
4	1999	JCPenney Classic (with (South Korea) Pak Se-ri)	(United States) John Daly and (England) Laura Davies	Lost to birdie on third extra hole

== Major championships ==
=== Wins (1) ===
Year	Championship	54 holes	Winning score	Margin	Runner-up
1993	PGA Championship	1 shot deficit	−12 (69-66-69-68=272)	Playoff	(Australia) Greg Norman

=== Results timeline ===
Tournament	1983	1984	1985	1986	1987	1988	1989
Masters Tournament					T17	CUT	T14
U.S. Open	CUT		CUT	34	CUT	T6	T9
The Open Championship					T2	T47	T8
PGA Championship			CUT	CUT	CUT	2	CUT

Tournament	1990	1991	1992	1993	1994	1995	1996	1997	1998	1999
Masters Tournament	CUT	52	T31	CUT		T17	T18	T28	5	CUT
U.S. Open	T24	CUT	T33	T3		CUT	T67	T28	T14	T12
The Open Championship	T48		T59	T59		CUT	CUT	CUT	CUT	
PGA Championship	T31		T33	1	CUT	T31	T31	T29	T13	T41

Tournament	2000	2001	2002	2003	2004	2005	2006	2007	2008	2009
Masters Tournament	T28	T15	CUT							
U.S. Open	T12	T5	CUT							
The Open Championship	T7			WD						
PGA Championship	T24	T22	CUT	CUT	T55	CUT	CUT		T63	CUT

Win
Top 10
Did not play

CUT = missed the half way cut
WD = Withdrew
"T" indicates a tie for a place.

=== Summary ===
Tournament	Wins	2nd	3rd	Top-5	Top-10	Top-25	Events	Cuts made
Masters Tournament	0	0	0	1	1	6	15	10
U.S. Open	0	0	1	2	4	8	18	12
The Open Championship	0	1	0	1	3	3	12	7
PGA Championship	1	1	0	2	2	5	23	13
Totals	1	2	1	6	10	22	68	42

- Most consecutive cuts made – 9 (1999 U.S. Open – 2001 PGA)
- Longest streak of top-10s – 2 (1989 U.S. Open – 1989 Open Championship)

== Results in The Players Championship ==
Tournament	1985	1986	1987	1988	1989	1990	1991	1992	1993	1994	1995	1996	1997	1998	1999	2000	2001	2002	2003	2004	2005	2006	2007
The Players Championship	CUT	T64	6	T30	T14	CUT	T3	T29	T6		CUT	CUT	T14	CUT	CUT	T17	T7	CUT	CUT				T64

Top 10
Did not play

CUT = missed the halfway cut
"T" indicates a tie for a place

== Results in World Golf Championships ==
Tournament	1999	2000	2001	2002	2003
Match Play	R32	R64		4	
Championship			NT^{1}	T43	
Invitational		T8	T5	T38	T39

^{1}Cancelled due to 9/11

Top 10
Did not play

QF, R16, R32, R64 = Round in which player lost in match play
"T" = Tied
NT = No tournament

== U.S. national team appearances ==
- Ryder Cup:
  - Player: 1989 (tie), 1991 (winners), 1993 (winners), 2002
  - Captain: 2008 (winners)
- World Cup: 1989
- Presidents Cup: 2000 (winners)
- UBS Warburg Cup: 2002 (winners)
- Wendy's 3-Tour Challenge (representing PGA Tour): 1993, 1994 (winners)

== See also ==
- Fall 1981 PGA Tour Qualifying School graduates
- 1983 PGA Tour Qualifying School graduates
- 1984 PGA Tour Qualifying School graduates
- List of Florida State Seminoles men's golfers
- List of men's major championships winning golfers
