= Phoenix Open =

Golf tournament held in Arizona, United States

WM Phoenix Open

Tournament information
- Location: Scottsdale, Arizona, U.S.
- Established: 1932
- Course: TPC Scottsdale
- Par: 71
- Length: 7,261 yards (6,639 m)
- Organized by: The Thunderbirds
- Tour: PGA Tour
- Format: Stroke play
- Prize fund: US$9,200,000
- Month played: February
- Website: wmphoenixopen.com

Tournament record score
- Aggregate: 256 Mark Calcavecchia (2001); 256 Phil Mickelson (2013)
- To par: −28 as above

Current champion
- (United States) Chris Gotterup

Location map
- Location in the United States Location in Arizona

The Phoenix Open (branded as the WM Phoenix Open for sponsorship reasons) is a professional golf tournament on the PGA Tour, held in early February at TPC Scottsdale in Scottsdale, Arizona, United States.

The tournament was originally the Arizona Open but was known for most of its history as the Phoenix Open until the investment bank Friedman Billings Ramsey became the title sponsor in October 2003. For the next six editions, it was known as the FBR Open. Waste Management, Inc. began its sponsorship in 2010.

The event's relaxed atmosphere, raucous by professional golf standards, has earned it the nickname "The Greatest Show on Grass" and made it one of the most popular events on the PGA Tour calendar.

== History ==
The Phoenix Open began in 1932, but was discontinued after the 1935 tournament. The rebirth of the Phoenix Open came in 1939 when Bob Goldwater Sr. convinced fellow Thunderbirds to help run the event. The Thunderbirds, a prominent civic organization in Phoenix, were less enthusiastic about running the event than he was, leaving Goldwater Sr. to do most of the work in getting a golf open started.

The event was played at the Phoenix Country Club in Phoenix (33.48°N 112.06°W), both in its earlier incarnations and after Goldwater resuscitated it. Beginning in 1955, the Arizona Country Club (also in Phoenix) (33.49°N 111.96°W), alternated as event host with Phoenix Country Club; this arrangement lasted until Phoenix Country Club took The Arizona Country Club's turn in 1975 and became the event's permanent home again.

The tournament moved in 1987 to its current home, the Stadium Course at TPC Scottsdale, northeast of downtown Phoenix. The approximate average elevation of the course is 1,530 feet (465 m) above sea level.

The purse was $8.2 million in 2022, then increased over 140% to $20 million for 2023, with a winner's share of $3.6 million.

Logo from 2010 to 2020

== Popularity ==
The five-day attendance of the tournament is usually around a half million, the best-attended event in golf. In 2016, it set a PGA Tour and Phoenix Open single-day attendance record with 201,003 fans on Saturday, February 6, and a tournament week attendance record of 618,365 fans.

The most popular location for spectators is the par-3 16th hole, nicknamed "The Coliseum." (33.64°N 111.91°W) One of the shortest holes on tour at 162 yards (148 m), it is enclosed by a temporary 20,000-seat grandstand. The hole could be described as "one big party," with many students from the nearby Arizona State University in Tempe in attendance. Poor shots at the 16th hole receive boos because the hole is straightforward by the PGA's standards. Good shots, however, are cheered loudly. Players who make holes in one at the 16th will cause the gallery to erupt, leading to beverages and other objects being tossed in celebrations; Tiger Woods (1997), Jarrod Lyle (2011), and Sam Ryder (2022) have each aced the hole on Saturday, creating raucous celebrations at the hole. The anger of a poor shot can lead to tempers flaring, as Justin Leonard gave obscene gestures to the gallery after a poor shot one year. After 2013, the PGA Tour banned the practice of caddies racing the 150 yards (140 m) from the tee box to the green, citing injury concerns.

Former Arizona State players are very popular at the Phoenix Open, with many often wearing a Pat Tillman jersey when entering the 16th-hole stadium. Phil Mickelson and Jon Rahm are popular there for that reason.

In addition to golf, the event consists of multiple concerts from Wednesday to Saturday of event week at a venue across the street from TPC Scottsdale called the Birds Nest. Some recent artists performing at the Birds Nest include John Summit, Nelly, Ludacris, Zach Top, and Bailey Zimmerman.

Since 2022, there is a concert on the 16th hole, the Saturday before tournament week, called the "Concert in the Coliseum". Artists to perform at this event include Post Malone, Maroon 5, Gwen Stefani, Blake Shelton, Thomas Rhett, and The Killers.

The Thunderbirds are still highly active in organizing the tournament. The Thunderbirds use portions of the proceeds to fund Special Olympics activities in Phoenix.

== Conflicts with the Super Bowl ==
Since 1973, the Phoenix Open has been played on the weekend of the Super Bowl. In 1976, coverage of the tournament's final round was joined in progress immediately after CBS's coverage of Super Bowl X. In 1996, it was played Wednesday through Saturday, as Super Bowl XXX was held at Sun Devil Stadium in nearby Tempe. In 2009, the tournament overlapped with Super Bowl XLIII in Tampa, Florida, when Kenny Perry and Charley Hoffman went to a playoff. That denied the spectators a chance to watch the beginning of the game on NBC, which featured the local Arizona Cardinals.

Because of the Super Bowl weekend status, the PGA Tour's television contracts with CBS and NBC include an alternating tournament. Usually, a CBS-broadcast tournament occurs when ABC/ESPN, NBC or Fox televises the Super Bowl; on the other hand, the Phoenix Open airs on NBC when CBS has the Super Bowl, and NBC's Honda Classic aired on CBS during the 2018 Winter Olympics.

In 2015, Super Bowl XLIX was held in Glendale at University of Phoenix Stadium and broadcast by NBC; the network would use sister network Golf Channel (which broadcasts early-round coverage for PGA Tour events) to provide cross-promotional tie-ins for the Super Bowl, including live tapings of Feherty from the Orpheum Theater.

== Highlights ==
- 1949: Ben Hogan loses in a playoff; driving home with his wife; he is involved in a near-fatal accident.
- 1987: Paul Azinger wins the first edition of the Phoenix Open held at TPC Scottsdale.
- 1990: Tom Pernice Jr. makes the first double eagle in tournament history on the par-5 15th hole.
- 1996: Grant Waite sets the course record of 60 (−11). Phil Mickelson, an alumnus of nearby Arizona State University, wins the tournament for the first time.
- 1997: Tiger Woods aces the par-3 16th hole in the third round on Saturday.
- 2001: Andrew Magee makes the first ace on a par-4 in PGA Tour history on the par-4 17th hole. Mark Calcavecchia sets the tournament record for lowest aggregate score with 256 (−28), including a course record-tying 60 (−11) in the second round.
- 2011: Jarrod Lyle aces the par-3 16th hole in the first round.
- 2019: Amy Bockerstette, a golfer with Down syndrome, pars the par-3 16th hole during the pro-am in front of Gary Woodland, a moment that went viral on social media.
- 2020: Woodland and Bockerstette reunite one year after their viral moment with a $25,000 contribution to the I Got This! Foundation, launched the previous year.
- 2022: Sam Ryder aces on the par-3 16th hole during the third round on Saturday, then in the final round, Carlos Ortiz would have a hole in one at the same hole.
- 2025: Thomas Detry becomes the first Belgian PGA Tour winner.

== Records ==
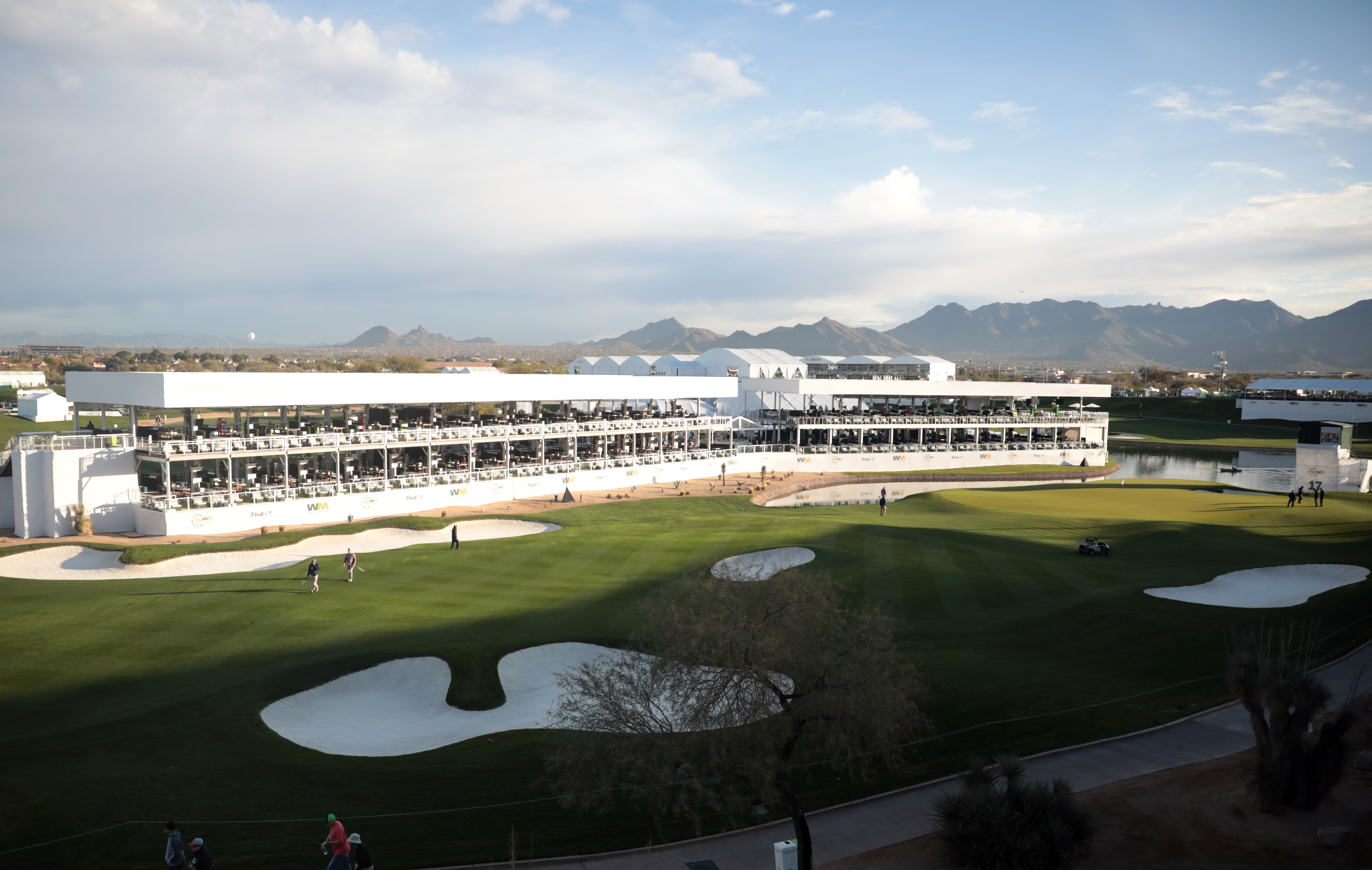
The 17th hole during the 2020 Waste Management Phoenix Open.

The tournament's lowest 72-hole score was set by Mark Calcavecchia in 2001 with 256 (–28), which was matched by Mickelson in 2013. In the second round Calcavecchia scored a 60 (–11), which equalled the lowest score at the Phoenix Open (by Grant Waite in 1996) and subsequently matched by Mickelson in 2005 and 2013. Calcavecchia had 32 birdies in the tournament, which was also an all-time record.

There have been only two double eagles in the history of the Phoenix Open. Tom Pernice Jr. made the first one on the 558-yard (510 m) par-5 15th hole in 1990. Andrew Magee scored the second on the 332-yard (304 m) par-4 17th hole in 2001, and was the first-ever ace on a par-4 in PGA Tour history.

== Winners ==
Year	Winner	Score	To par	Margin of victory	Runner(s)-up	Purse ($)	Winner's share ($)
WM Phoenix Open
2026	(United States) Chris Gotterup	268	−16	Playoff	(Japan) Hideki Matsuyama	9,600,000	1,728,000
2025	(Belgium) Thomas Detry	260	−24	7 strokes	(United States) Daniel Berger (United States) Michael Kim	9,200,000	1,656,000
2024	(Canada) Nick Taylor	263	−21	Playoff	(United States) Charley Hoffman	8,800,000	1,584,000
2023	(United States) Scottie Scheffler (2)	265	−19	2 strokes	(Canada) Nick Taylor	20,000,000	3,600,000
2022	(United States) Scottie Scheffler	268	−16	Playoff	(United States) Patrick Cantlay	8,200,000	1,476,000
Waste Management Phoenix Open
2021	(United States) Brooks Koepka (2)	265	−19	1 stroke	(South Korea) Lee Kyoung-hoon (United States) Xander Schauffele	7,300,000	1,314,000
2020	(United States) Webb Simpson	267	−17	Playoff	(United States) Tony Finau	7,300,000	1,314,000
2019	(United States) Rickie Fowler	267	−17	2 strokes	(South Africa) Branden Grace	7,100,000	1,278,000
2018	(United States) Gary Woodland	266	−18	Playoff	(United States) Chez Reavie	6,900,000	1,242,000
2017	(Japan) Hideki Matsuyama (2)	267	−17	Playoff	(United States) Webb Simpson	6,700,000	1,206,000
2016	(Japan) Hideki Matsuyama	270	−14	Playoff	(United States) Rickie Fowler	6,500,000	1,170,000
2015	(United States) Brooks Koepka	269	−15	1 stroke	(Japan) Hideki Matsuyama (United States) Ryan Palmer (United States) Bubba Watson	6,300,000	1,134,000
2014	(United States) Kevin Stadler	268	−16	1 stroke	(Canada) Graham DeLaet (United States) Bubba Watson	6,200,000	1,116,000
2013	(United States) Phil Mickelson (3)	256	−28	4 strokes	(United States) Brandt Snedeker	6,200,000	1,116,000
2012	(United States) Kyle Stanley	269	−15	1 stroke	(United States) Ben Crane	6,100,000	1,098,000
2011	(United States) Mark Wilson	266	−18	Playoff	(United States) Jason Dufner	6,100,000	1,098,000
2010	(United States) Hunter Mahan	268	−16	1 stroke	(United States) Rickie Fowler	6,000,000	1,080,000
FBR Open
2009	(United States) Kenny Perry	270	−14	Playoff	(United States) Charley Hoffman	6,000,000	1,080,000
2008	(United States) J. B. Holmes (2)	270	−14	Playoff	(United States) Phil Mickelson	6,000,000	1,080,000
2007	(Australia) Aaron Baddeley	263	−21	1 stroke	(United States) John Rollins	6,000,000	1,080,000
2006	(United States) J. B. Holmes	263	−21	7 strokes	(United States) J. J. Henry (United States) Steve Lowery (United States) Ryan Palmer (United States) Scott Verplank (Colombia) Camilo Villegas	5,200,000	936,000
2005	(United States) Phil Mickelson (2)	267	−17	5 strokes	(United States) Scott McCarron (United States) Kevin Na	5,200,000	936,000
2004	(United States) Jonathan Kaye	266	−18	2 strokes	(United States) Chris DiMarco	5,200,000	936,000
Phoenix Open
2003	(Fiji) Vijay Singh (2)	261	−23	3 strokes	(United States) John Huston	4,000,000	720,000
2002	(United States) Chris DiMarco	267	−17	1 stroke	(United States) Kenny Perry (Japan) Kaname Yokoo	4,000,000	720,000
2001	(United States) Mark Calcavecchia (3)	256	−28	8 strokes	(United States) Rocco Mediate	4,000,000	720,000
2000	(United States) Tom Lehman	270	−14	1 stroke	(Australia) Robert Allenby (United States) Rocco Mediate	3,200,000	576,000
1999	(United States) Rocco Mediate	273	−11	2 strokes	(United States) Justin Leonard	3,000,000	540,000
1998	(Sweden) Jesper Parnevik	269	−15	3 strokes	(United States) Tommy Armour III (United States) Brent Geiberger (United States) Steve Pate (United States) Tom Watson	2,500,000	450,000
1997	(United States) Steve Jones	258	−26	11 strokes	(Sweden) Jesper Parnevik	1,500,000	270,000
1996	(United States) Phil Mickelson	269	−15	Playoff	(United States) Justin Leonard	1,300,000	234,000
1995	(Fiji) Vijay Singh	269	−15	Playoff	(United States) Billy Mayfair	1,300,000	234,000
1994	(United States) Bill Glasson	268	−16	3 strokes	(United States) Bob Estes	1,200,000	216,000
1993	(United States) Lee Janzen	273	−11	2 strokes	(United States) Andrew Magee	1,000,000	180,000
1992	(United States) Mark Calcavecchia (2)	264	−20	5 strokes	(United States) Duffy Waldorf	1,000,000	180,000
1991	(United States) Nolan Henke	268	−16	1 stroke	(United States) Gil Morgan (United States) Curtis Strange (United States) Tom Watson	1,000,000	180,000
1990	(United States) Tommy Armour III	267	−17	5 strokes	(United States) Jim Thorpe	900,000	162,000
1989	(United States) Mark Calcavecchia	263	−21	7 strokes	(United States) Chip Beck	700,000	126,000
1988	(Scotland) Sandy Lyle	269	−15	Playoff	(United States) Fred Couples	650,000	117,000
1987	(United States) Paul Azinger	268	−16	1 stroke	(United States) Hal Sutton	600,000	108,000
1986	(United States) Hal Sutton	267	−17	2 strokes	(United States) Calvin Peete (United States) Tony Sills	500,000	90,000
1985	(United States) Calvin Peete	270	−14	2 strokes	(United States) Morris Hatalsky (United States) Doug Tewell	450,000	81,000
1984	(United States) Tom Purtzer	268	−16	1 stroke	(United States) Corey Pavin	400,000	72,000
1983	(United States) Bob Gilder (2)	271	−13	Playoff	(United States) Rex Caldwell (United States) Johnny Miller (United States) Mark O'Meara	350,000	63,000
1982	(United States) Lanny Wadkins	263	−21	6 strokes	(United States) Jerry Pate	300,000	54,000
1981	(United States) David Graham	268	−16	1 stroke	(United States) Lon Hinkle	300,000	54,000
1980	(United States) Jeff Mitchell	272	−12	4 strokes	(United States) Rik Massengale	300,000	54,000
1979	(United States) Ben Crenshaw	199 (Note: Shortened to 54 holes due to rain.)	−14	1 stroke	(United States) Jay Haas	250,000	33,750
1978	(United States) Miller Barber	272	−12	1 stroke	(United States) Jerry Pate (United States) Lee Trevino	200,000	40,000
1977	(United States) Jerry Pate	277	−7	Playoff	(United States) Dave Stockton	200,000	40,000
1976	(United States) Bob Gilder	268	−16	2 strokes	(United States) Roger Maltbie	200,000	40,000
1975	(United States) Johnny Miller (2)	260	−24	14 strokes	(United States) Jerry Heard	150,000	30,000
1974	(United States) Johnny Miller	271	−13	1 stroke	(United States) Lanny Wadkins	150,000	30,000
1973	(Australia) Bruce Crampton	268	−12	1 stroke	(United States) Steve Melnyk (United States) Lanny Wadkins	150,000	30,000
1972	(United States) Homero Blancas	273	−11	Playoff	(United States) Lanny Wadkins	125,000	25,000
Phoenix Open Invitational
1971	(United States) Miller Barber	261	−23	2 strokes	(United States) Billy Casper (United States) Dan Sikes	125,000	25,000
1970	(United States) Dale Douglass	271	−13	1 stroke	(United States) Howie Johnson (United States) Gene Littler	100,000	20,000
1969	(United States) Gene Littler (3)	263	−21	2 strokes	(United States) Miller Barber (United States) Don January (United States) Billy Maxwell	100,000	20,000
1968	(Canada) George Knudson	272	−12	3 strokes	(United States) Julius Boros (United States) Sam Carmichael (United States) Jack Montgomery	100,000	20,000
1967	(United States) Julius Boros	272	−12	1 stroke	(United States) Ken Still	70,000	14,000
1966	(United States) Dudley Wysong	278	−6	1 stroke	(United States) Gardner Dickinson	60,000	9,000
1965	(United States) Rod Funseth	274	−14	3 strokes	(United States) Bert Yancey	65,000	10,500
1964	(United States) Jack Nicklaus	271	−13	3 strokes	(United States) Bob Brue	50,000	7,500
1963	(United States) Arnold Palmer (3)	273	−15	1 stroke	(South Africa) Gary Player	35,000	5,300
1962	(United States) Arnold Palmer (2)	269	−15	12 strokes	(United States) Billy Casper (United States) Don Fairfield (United States) Bob McCallister (United States) Jack Nicklaus	35,000	5,300
1961	(United States) Arnold Palmer	270	−10	Playoff	(United States) Doug Sanders	30,000	4,300
1960	(United States) Jack Fleck	273	−11	Playoff	(United States) Bill Collins	22,500	3,150
1959	(United States) Gene Littler (2)	268	−12	1 stroke	(United States) Art Wall Jr.	20,000	2,400
1958	(United States) Ken Venturi	274	−10	1 stroke	(United States) Walter Burkemo (United States) Jay Hebert	15,000	2,000
1957	(United States) Billy Casper	271	−9	3 strokes	(United States) Cary Middlecoff (United States) Mike Souchak	15,000	2,000
Phoenix Open
1956	(United States) Cary Middlecoff	276	−8	3 strokes	(United States) Mike Souchak	15,000	2,400
1955	(United States) Gene Littler	275	−5	1 stroke	(United States) Billy Maxwell (United States) Johnny Palmer	15,000	2,400
1954	(United States) Ed Furgol	272	−12	Playoff	(United States) Cary Middlecoff	10,000	2,000
1953	(United States) Lloyd Mangrum (2)	272	−12	6 strokes	(United States) Johnny Bulla (United States) Ted Kroll (United States) Bo Wininger	10,000	2,000
1952	(United States) Lloyd Mangrum	274	−10	5 strokes	(United States) Dutch Harrison	10,000	2,000
1951	(United States) Lew Worsham	272	−12	1 stroke	(United States) Lawson Little	10,000	2,000
Ben Hogan Open
1950	(United States) Jimmy Demaret (2)	269	−15	1 stroke	(United States) Sam Snead	10,000	2,000
Phoenix Open
1949	(United States) Jimmy Demaret	278	−6	Playoff	(United States) Ben Hogan	10,000	2,000
1948	(South Africa) Bobby Locke	268	−16	1 stroke	(United States) Jimmy Demaret	10,000	2,000
1947	(United States) Ben Hogan (2)	270	−14	7 strokes	(United States) Lloyd Mangrum (United States) Ed Oliver	10,000	2,000
1946	(United States) Ben Hogan	273	−11	Playoff	(United States) Herman Keiser	7,500	1,500
1945	(United States) Byron Nelson (2)	274	−10	2 strokes	(United States) Denny Shute	5,000	1,000
1944	(United States) Jug McSpaden	273	−11	Playoff	(United States) Byron Nelson	5,000	1,000
1941–1943: No tournament
1940	(United States) Ed Oliver	205	−8	1 stroke	(United States) Ben Hogan	3,000	700
1939	(United States) Byron Nelson	198	−15	12 strokes	(United States) Ben Hogan	3,000	700
1936–1938: No tournament
1935	(United States) Ky Laffoon	281	−3	4 strokes	(United States) Craig Wood	2,500	500
1934	No tournament						
Arizona Open
1933	(United States) Harry Cooper	281	−3	2 strokes	(United States) Ray Mangrum (United States) Horton Smith	1,500	400
1932	(United States) Ralph Guldahl	285	−1	5 strokes	(United States) John Perelli	2,500	600

Note: Green highlight indicates scoring records.
