= Malcolm MacKenzie =

English golfer (born 1961)

Malcolm Mackenzie
Personal information
- Full name: Malcolm John Mackenzie
- Nationality: England
- Born: 30 September 1961 (age 65) Sheffield, Yorkshire, England
- Height: 1.73 m (5 ft 8 in)
- Weight: 81 kg (179 lb; 12.8 st)
- Children: 4

Career
- Sport: Golf
- Turned professional: 1980
- Current tour: European Senior Tour
- Former tours: European Tour; Sunshine Tour
- Professional wins: 2

Number of wins by tour
- European Tour: 1

Best results in major championships
- Masters Tournament: DNP
- PGA Championship: DNP
- U.S. Open: DNP
- The Open Championship: T5: 1992

Malcolm John Mackenzie (born 30 September 1961) is an English professional golfer best known for the European Tour record of most events before a win, the 2002 Open de France, after 509 starts.

== Career ==
Mackenzie was born in Sheffield. He turned professional in 1980 and has spent most of his career playing on the European Tour. His best Order of Merit ranking was 25th in 1990, one of twelve times he made the top 100. He has just one European Tour win to his name, the 2002 Novotel Perrier Open de France, achieved during his 20th season and in his 509th appearance on tour. 509 appearances is the European Tour record for a first win: Richard Bland is second with 478 appearances and Roger Chapman is third with 472. He also won the Zimbabwe Open in 1985.

In late 2003, he underwent shoulder surgery and has struggled to recover his form. His last full season on tour was 2005, when he made just three cuts and finished well outside the top 200 on the Order of Merit. In 2006, he became the 4th player to make 600 appearances on the European Tour when he teed it up at the BMW International Open. He has played only a handful of tournaments since then.

== Professional wins (2) ==
=== European Tour wins (1) ===
No.	Date	Tournament	Winning score	Margin of victory	Runner-up
1	5 May 2002	Novotel Perrier Open de France	−14 (68-69-65-72=274)	1 stroke	(South Africa) Trevor Immelman

=== Safari Circuit wins (1) ===
No.	Date	Tournament	Winning score	Margin of victory	Runner-up
1	31 Mar 1985	Zimbabwe Open	−7 (70-70-73-68=281)	3 strokes	(Wales) David Llewellyn

== Results in major championships ==
Tournament	1984	1985	1986	1987	1988	1989
The Open Championship	T55		T59	CUT		

Tournament	1990	1991	1992	1993	1994	1995	1996	1997	1998	1999
The Open Championship	71	T80	T5	T27			CUT			

Tournament	2000	2001	2002	2003
The Open Championship			CUT	CUT

Note: MacKenzie only played in The Open Championship.

Top 10
Did not play

CUT = missed the half-way cut
"T" indicates a tie for a place

== Team appearances ==
Amateur

- Jacques Léglise Trophy (representing Great Britain & Ireland): 1979 (winners)
