= Shriners Children's Open =

Golf tournament

Tournament information
- Location: Las Vegas, Nevada, U.S.
- Established: 1983
- Course: TPC at Summerlin
- Par: 71
- Length: 7,255 yards (6,634 m)
- Organized by: Shriners Hospitals for Children
- Tour: PGA Tour
- Format: Stroke play
- Prize fund: US$8,400,000
- Month played: October
- Final year: 2024

Tournament record score
- Aggregate: 72 holes: 260 Ryan Moore (2012); 260 Webb Simpson (2013); 260 Im Sung-jae (2021); 260 Tom Kim (2022); 90 holes: 328 Stuart Appleby (2003); 328 Scott McCarron (2003)
- To par: 72 holes: −25 Marc Turnesa (2008); 90 holes: −31 Andrew Magee (1991) −31 D. A. Weibring (1991) −31 Stuart Appleby (2003) −31 Scott McCarron (2003)

Final champion
- (United States) J. T. Poston

Location map
- Location in the United States Location in Nevada

The Shriners Children's Open was a golf tournament on the PGA Tour in Nevada. Founded 43 years ago in 1983, it was played annually in October in Las Vegas. It was held at the TPC Summerlin, west of central Las Vegas at an approximate average elevation of 2,700 feet (820 m) above sea level.

== History ==
Known by various titles, it was originally played over five rounds (90 holes) over several other courses. When created in 1983, it had the highest purse on tour at $750,000. Tiger Woods recorded his first PGA Tour victory at Las Vegas in October 1996, in a playoff over 1993 champion Davis Love III. The format was changed to 72 holes in 2004.

In 2007 the tournament announced that the Shriners Hospitals for Children would take over the operations of the tournament and that the Las Vegas Founders, a volunteer group, would no longer be involved with the event. The following year Fry's Electronics, chief presenting sponsor in 2006 and 2007, ended their association with the event, choosing to concentrate on a second tournament in Arizona that it was already sponsoring. Entertainer Justin Timberlake was the host of the tournament for five years, 2008 through 2012. Timberlake, an avid golfer who plays to a 6 handicap, played in the celebrity pro-am and hosted a benefit concert during the week of the tournament.

The inaugural tournament in 1983 had a then-record official purse of $750,000 and Fuzzy Zoeller took the $135,000 winner's share at Las Vegas Country Club in mid-September. In 1984, it became the first PGA Tour event in history to offer a purse exceeding a million dollars: champion Denis Watson won $162,000 from a prize pool of $1,122,500. The tourney moved to late March in 1985, to early May in 1986, then to mid-October in 1990. A tradition at the tournament is presenting the trophy to the champion while two showgirls are a part of the pomp and circumstance.

In its history, the Las Vegas event has been hosted by numerous courses before settling at its current venue, TPC Summerlin. Past venues include TPC at the Canyons (now TPC Las Vegas), Bear's Best Golf Club, Southern Highlands Golf Club, Desert Inn Country Club (now the Wynn Golf & Country Club), Las Vegas Country Club, Las Vegas Hilton Country Club (now Las Vegas National Golf Club), Sunrise Golf Club, Spanish Trail Golf & Country Club, Showboat Country Club (now Wildhorse Golf Club), Dunes Country Club and Stallion Mountain Golf Club. Several of these courses are no longer operational.

Four players won multiple titles in Las Vegas. Jim Furyk won three times, in 1995, 1998 and 1999. Kevin Na won twice, in 2011 and 2019. Martin Laird won in 2009 and 2020, and Tom Kim won in 2022 and 2023.

In the 2010 tournament, Jonathan Byrd made a hole in one on the fourth hole of a three-man sudden-death playoff to win.

The 2024 event proved to be the final edition of the Shriners Children's Open, with Shriners Hospitals for Children not renewing their contract for 2025.

== Course layout ==
Hole	1	2	3	4	5	6	7	8	9	Out	10	11	12	13	14	15	16	17	18	In	Total
Yards	408	469	492	450	197	430	382	239	563	3,610	420	448	442	606	168	341	560	196	444	3,625	7,255
Par	4	4	4	4	3	4	4	3	5	35	4	4	4	5	3	4	5	3	4	36	71

== Winners ==
Year	Winner	Score	To par	Margin of victory	Runner(s)-up	Purse ($)	Winner's share ($)	Ref.
Shriners Children's Open
2024	(United States) J. T. Poston	262	−22	1 stroke	(United States) Doug Ghim	7,000,000	1,260,000	
2023	(South Korea) Tom Kim (2)	264	−20	1 stroke	(Canada) Adam Hadwin	8,400,000	1,512,000	
2022	(South Korea) Tom Kim	260	−24	3 strokes	(United States) Patrick Cantlay (United States) Matthew NeSmith	8,000,000	1,440,000	
2021	(South Korea) Im Sung-jae	260	−24	4 strokes	(United States) Matthew Wolff	7,000,000	1,260,000	
Shriners Hospitals for Children Open
2020	(Scotland) Martin Laird (2)	261	−23	Playoff	(United States) Austin Cook (United States) Matthew Wolff	7,000,000	1,260,000	
2019	(United States) Kevin Na (2)	261	−23	Playoff	(United States) Patrick Cantlay	7,000,000	1,260,000	
2018	(United States) Bryson DeChambeau	263	−21	1 stroke	(United States) Patrick Cantlay	7,000,000	1,260,000	
2017	(United States) Patrick Cantlay	275	−9	Playoff	(Germany) Alex Čejka (South Korea) Kim Meen-whee	6,800,000	1,224,000	
2016	(Australia) Rod Pampling	264	−20	2 strokes	(United States) Brooks Koepka	6,600,000	1,188,000	
2015	(United States) Smylie Kaufman	268	−16	1 stroke	(United States) Jason Bohn (Germany) Alex Čejka (United States) Patton Kizzire (United States) Kevin Na (United States) Brett Stegmaier (United States) Cameron Tringale	6,400,000	1,152,000	
2014	(United States) Ben Martin	264	−20	2 strokes	(United States) Kevin Streelman	6,200,000	1,116,000	
2013	(United States) Webb Simpson	260	−24	6 strokes	(United States) Jason Bohn (Japan) Ryo Ishikawa	6,000,000	1,080,000	
Justin Timberlake Shriners Hospitals for Children Open
2012	(United States) Ryan Moore	260	−24	1 stroke	(Zimbabwe) Brendon de Jonge	4,500,000	810,000	
2011	(United States) Kevin Na	261	−23	2 strokes	(United States) Nick Watney	4,400,000	792,000	
2010	(United States) Jonathan Byrd	263	−21	Playoff	(Scotland) Martin Laird (Australia) Cameron Percy	4,300,000	774,000	
2009	(Scotland) Martin Laird	265	−19	Playoff	(United States) Chad Campbell (United States) George McNeill	4,200,000	756,000	
2008	(United States) Marc Turnesa	263	−25	1 stroke	(United States) Matt Kuchar	4,100,000	738,000	
Frys.com Open
2007	(United States) George McNeill	264	−24	4 strokes	(United States) D. J. Trahan	4,000,000	720,000	
2006	(United States) Troy Matteson	265	−23	1 stroke	(Sweden) Daniel Chopra (United States) Ben Crane	4,000,000	720,000	
Michelin Championship at Las Vegas
2005	(United States) Wes Short Jr.	266	−21	Playoff	(United States) Jim Furyk	4,000,000	720,000	
2004	(Australia) Andre Stolz	266	−21	1 stroke	(United States) Harrison Frazar (United States) Tom Lehman (United States) Tag Ridings	4,000,000	720,000	
Las Vegas Invitational
2003	(Australia) Stuart Appleby	328	−31	Playoff	(United States) Scott McCarron	4,000,000	720,000	
Invensys Classic at Las Vegas
2002	(New Zealand) Phil Tataurangi	330	−29	1 stroke	(Australia) Stuart Appleby (United States) Jeff Sluman	5,000,000	900,000	
2001	(United States) Bob Estes	329	−30	1 stroke	(United States) Tom Lehman (South Africa) Rory Sabbatini	4,500,000	810,000	
2000	(United States) Billy Andrade	332	−28	1 stroke	(United States) Phil Mickelson	4,250,000	765,000	
Las Vegas Invitational
1999	(United States) Jim Furyk (3)	331	−29	1 stroke	(United States) Jonathan Kaye	2,500,000	450,000	
1998	(United States) Jim Furyk (2)	335	−25	1 stroke	(United States) Mark Calcavecchia	2,000,000	360,000	
1997	(United States) Bill Glasson	340	−20	1 stroke	(United States) David Edwards (United States) Billy Mayfair	1,800,000	324,000	
1996	(United States) Tiger Woods	332	−27	Playoff	(United States) Davis Love III	1,650,000	297,000	
1995	(United States) Jim Furyk	331	−28	1 stroke	(United States) Billy Mayfair	1,500,000	270,000	
1994	(United States) Bruce Lietzke	332	−28	1 stroke	(United States) Robert Gamez	1,500,000	270,000	
1993	(United States) Davis Love III	331	−29	8 strokes	(United States) Craig Stadler	1,400,000	252,000	
1992	(United States) John Cook	334	−26	2 strokes	(South Africa) David Frost	1,300,000	234,000	
1991	(United States) Andrew Magee	329	−31	Playoff	(United States) D. A. Weibring	1,500,000	270,000	
1990	(United States) Bob Tway	334	−26	Playoff	(United States) John Cook	1,300,000	234,000	
1989	(United States) Scott Hoch	336	−24	Playoff	(United States) Robert Wrenn	1,250,000	225,000	
Panasonic Las Vegas Invitational
1988	(United States) Gary Koch	274 (Note: Shortened to 72 holes due to weather.)	−14	1 stroke	(United States) Peter Jacobsen (United States) Mark O'Meara	1,388,889	250,000	
1987	(United States) Paul Azinger	271	−17	1 stroke	(United States) Hal Sutton	1,250,000	225,000	
1986	(Australia) Greg Norman	333	−27	7 strokes	(United States) Dan Pohl	1,150,000	207,000	
1985	(United States) Curtis Strange	338	−17	1 stroke	(United States) Mike Smith	950,000	171,000	
1984	(Zimbabwe) Denis Watson	341	−15	1 stroke	(United States) Andy Bean	900,000	162,000	
Panasonic Las Vegas Pro-Celebrity Classic
1983	(United States) Fuzzy Zoeller	340	−18	4 strokes	(United States) Rex Caldwell	750,000	135,000	

Note: Green highlight indicates scoring records.

== Tournament record scores ==
=== Five round tournament ===
The first 21 events (1983–2003) were scheduled for 90 holes.
Aggregate

- 328 Scott McCarron (2003)
- 328 Stuart Appleby (2003)

To-par

- −31 Andrew Magee (1991)
- −31 D. A. Weibring (1991)
- −31 Scott McCarron (2003)
- −31 Stuart Appleby (2003)

=== Four round tournament ===
The event switched to a 72-hole format in 2004.
Aggregate

- 260 Ryan Moore (2012)
- 260 Webb Simpson (2013)

To-par

- −25 Marc Turnesa (2008)
