= 1987 Open Championship =

Coordinates: 56.043°N 2.823°W

Tournament information
- Dates: 16–19 July 1987
- Location: Gullane, Scotland
- Course: Muirfield
- Tour(s): European Tour; PGA Tour

Statistics
- Par: 71
- Length: 6,963 yards (6,367 m)
- Field: 153 players, 78 after cut
- Cut: 146 (+4)
- Prize fund: £650,000 $1,040,000
- Winner's share: £75,000 $120,000

Champion
- (England) Nick Faldo
- 279 (−5)

Location in Scotland

The 1987 Open Championship was a men's major golf championship and the 116th Open Championship, held from 16 to 19 July at Muirfield Golf Links in Gullane, Scotland. Nick Faldo won the first of his three Open Championships, one stroke ahead of runners-up Paul Azinger and Rodger Davis. It was the first of Faldo's six major championships. It was the first win at The Open by an Englishman since Tony Jacklin in 1969.

This was the thirteenth Open Championship held at Muirfield; the previous was in 1980 and the next in 1992.

== Round summaries ==
=== First round ===
Thursday, 16 July 1987

Place	Player	Score	To par
1	(Australia) Rodger Davis	64	−7
T2	(United States) Ken Green	67	−4
T2	(United States) Lee Trevino	67	−4
T2	(United States) Bob Tway	67	−4
T5	(United States) Paul Azinger	68	−3
T5	(England) Nick Faldo	68	−3
T5	(United States) Larry Mize	68	−3
T5	(Zimbabwe) Nick Price	68	−3
T9	(Scotland) Ken Brown	69	−2
T9	(United States) Mark Calcavecchia	69	−2
T9	(Australia) David Graham	69	−2
T9	(United States) Jay Haas	69	−2
T9	(West Germany) Bernhard Langer	69	−2
T9	(Australia) Graham Marsh	69	−2
T9	(Japan) Masashi Ozaki	69	−2
T9	(United States) Craig Stadler	69	−2
T9	(Australia) Gerry Taylor	69	−2
T9	(United States) Tom Watson	69	−2

=== Second round ===
Friday, 17 July 1987

Place	Player	Score	To par
1	(United States) Paul Azinger	68-68=136	−6
T2	(Australia) Rodger Davis	64-73=137	−5
T2	(England) Nick Faldo	68-69=137	−5
T2	(United States) Payne Stewart	71-66=137	−5
T2	(Australia) Gerry Taylor	69-68=137	−5
T6	(South Africa) David Frost	70-68=138	−4
T6	(West Germany) Bernhard Langer	69-69=138	−4
T6	(United States) Craig Stadler	69-69=138	−4
T6	(United States) Tom Watson	69-69=138	−4
T10	(United States) Mark Calcavecchia	69-70=139	−3
T10	(Australia) Graham Marsh	69-70=139	−3
T10	(England) Carl Mason	70-69=139	−3
T10	(United States) Larry Mize	68-71=139	−3
T10	(Zimbabwe) Nick Price	68-71=139	−3
T10	(United States) Bob Tway	67-72=139	−3

Amateurs: Mayo (E), Willison (+4), Winchester (+6), Curry (+9), Härdin (+11), Bottomley (+12), Hird (+12), O'Connell (+12), Ambridge (+13), George (+13), Robinson (+13), Jones (+16), Hamer (+17).

=== Third round ===
Saturday, 18 July 1987

After tolerable weather conditions for the first two days, the third round on Saturday was played in a storm of wind and rain.

Place	Player	Score	To par
1	(United States) Paul Azinger	68-68-71=207	−6
T2	(England) Nick Faldo	68-69-71=208	−5
T2	(South Africa) David Frost	70-68-70=208	−5
T4	(United States) Craig Stadler	69-69-71=209	−4
T4	(United States) Payne Stewart	71-66-72=209	−4
T4	(United States) Tom Watson	69-69-71=209	−4
7	(United States) Raymond Floyd	72-68-70=210	−3
T8	(United States) Mark Calcavecchia	69-70-72=211	−2
T8	(Australia) Rodger Davis	64-73-74=211	−2
T8	(Australia) Graham Marsh	69-70-72=211	−2
T8	(Zimbabwe) Nick Price	68-71-72=211	−2

=== Final round ===
Sunday, 19 July 1987

The final round was played in a gray mist. Azinger had a three stroke lead at the turn which was soon reduced to one, where it remained through 16 holes. Using a driver at the par-5 17th, he found a fairway bunker off the tee and bogeyed. Now tied with Faldo, Azinger's approach shot from the fairway on 18 found the left greenside bunker and led to another bogey. In the pairing just ahead, Faldo parred all 18 holes to win his first major by a stroke.

Place	Player	Score	To par	Money (£)
1	(England) Nick Faldo	68-69-71-71=279	−5	75,000
T2	(United States) Paul Azinger	68-68-71-73=280	−4	49,500
T2	(Australia) Rodger Davis	64-73-74-69=280	−4	49,500
T4	(United States) Ben Crenshaw	73-68-72-68=281	−3	31,000
T4	(United States) Payne Stewart	71-66-72-72=281	−3	31,000
6	(South Africa) David Frost	70-68-70-74=282	−2	26,000
7	(United States) Tom Watson	69-69-71-74=283	−1	23,000
T8	(Zimbabwe) Nick Price	68-71-72-73=284	E	18,667
T8	(United States) Craig Stadler	69-69-71-75=284	E	18,667
T8	(Wales) Ian Woosnam	71-69-72-72=284	E	18,667

Amateurs: Mayo (+13), Willison (+21)
