= Nick Faldo =

English golfer and TV commentator (born 1957)

Sir Nick Faldo MBE
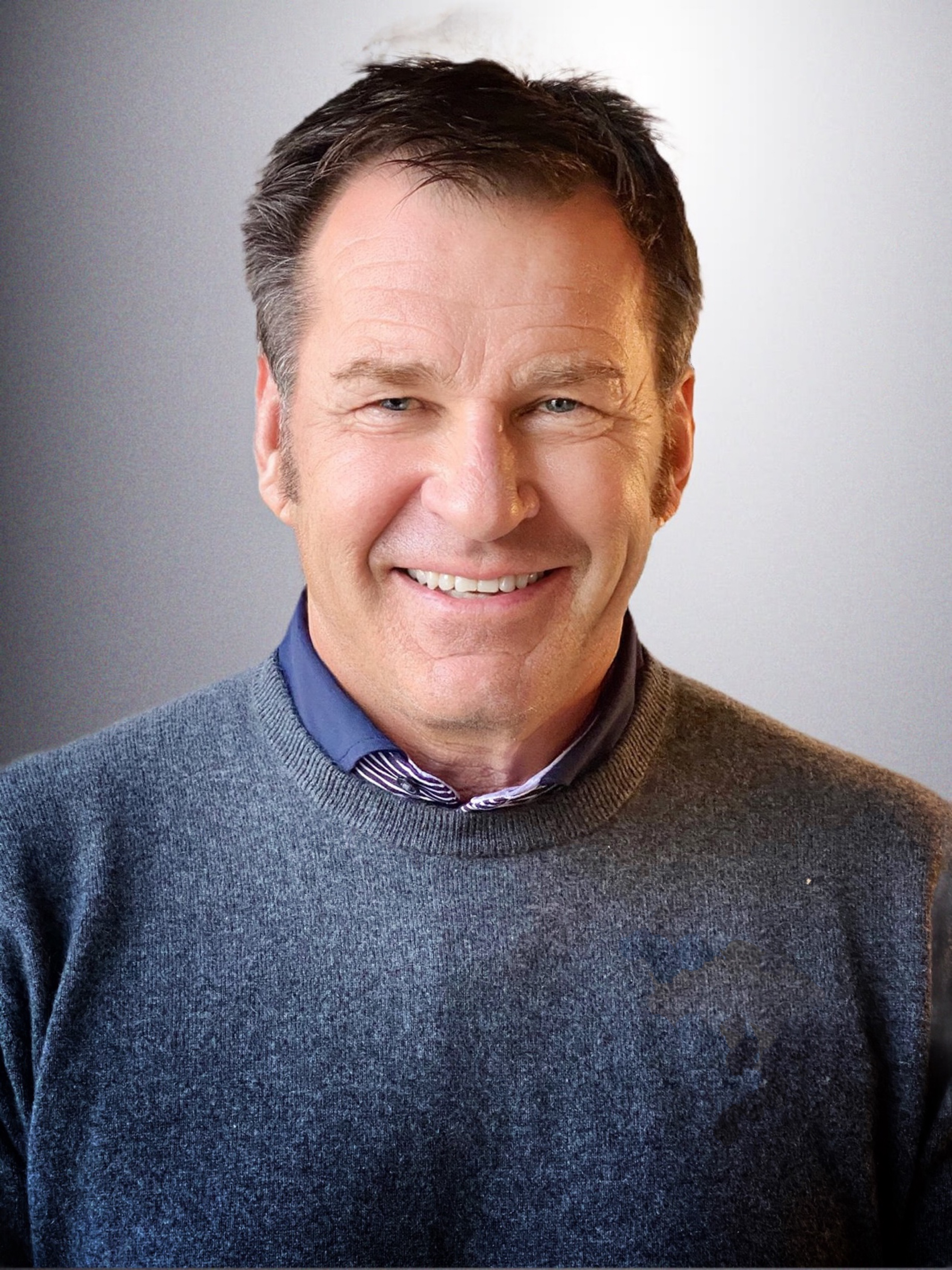
- Faldo in 2021

Personal information
- Full name: Nicholas Alexander Faldo
- Nationality: England
- Born: 18 July 1957 (age 69) Welwyn Garden City, Hertfordshire, England
- Height: 6 ft 3 in (191 cm)
- Weight: 13.9 st (195 lb; 88 kg)
- Spouses: Melanie Rockall (m. 1979; div. 1984) Gill Bennett (m. 1986; div. 1995) Valerie Bercher (m. 2001; div. 2006) Lindsay De Marco (m. 2020)
- Children: 4

Career
- Sport: Golf
- College: University of Houston
- Turned professional: 1976
- Former tours: PGA Tour; European Tour; Southern Africa Tour; PGA Tour Champions
- Professional wins: 43

Number of wins by tour
- PGA Tour: 9
- European Tour: 30 (5th all-time)
- Sunshine Tour: 1
- Other: 9

Best results in major championships (wins: 6)
- Masters Tournament: Won: 1989, 1990, 1996
- PGA Championship: T2: 1992
- U.S. Open: 2nd: 1988
- The Open Championship: Won: 1987, 1990, 1992

Achievements and awards
- World Golf Hall of Fame: 1997 (member page)
- Sir Henry Cotton Rookie of the Year: 1977
- European Tour official money list winner/ Order of Merit winner: 1983, 1992
- European Tour Golfer of the Year: 1989, 1990, 1992
- PGA Player of the Year: 1990
- Payne Stewart Award: 2014

Sir Nicholas Alexander Faldo (born 18 July 1957) is an English retired professional golfer and television commentator. Faldo was renowned for his dedication to the game, and was ranked number one on the Official World Golf Ranking for a total of 97 weeks. His 43 professional wins include 30 victories on the European Tour and six major championships: three Open Championships (1987, 1990, 1992) and three Masters (1989, 1990, 1996). He was inducted into the World Golf Hall of Fame in 1998.

Faldo has since become a television commentator for golf championships. In 2006, he became the lead golf analyst for CBS Sports. In 2012, Faldo joined the BBC Sport on-air team for coverage of the Open Championship.

== Early life ==
Faldo was born in Welwyn Garden City, Hertfordshire, England, in 1957, as the only child of Joyce and George Faldo, an accountant at Imperial Chemical Industries. Responding to suggestions that Faldo might be an Italian surname, George Faldo stated it is of English origin, and had traced it to a 13th-century knight in Bedford.

Faldo "became hooked" on golf at age 14 — having never "even picked up a golf club" himself, watching Jack Nicklaus play the 1971 Masters on his parents' new colour television, his first exposure to the game.

== Amateur career ==
Faldo qualified to play in the 1974 English Amateur at Woodhall Spa. In 1975, he won both the English Amateur at Royal Lytham and the British Youths Open Amateur Championship. His successes came too late to gain a Walker Cup place that year, the match being played in late May with the team selected in November 1974. He represented Great Britain in the Commonwealth Tournament in South Africa in November 1975. Faldo describes his late discovery of golf enthusiastically, saying that he "love[d] school, until golf came along"—after which "the only thing [he] was interested in was getting out of the gates as quick as possible and going to the golf course."

Faldo's golf prowess was soon noticed in the United States, where he was given a golf scholarship to the University of Houston. He attended for ten weeks, but he felt the distraction of going to school hurt his golf game.

== Professional career ==
=== European Tour ===
After leaving the university, Faldo turned professional in 1976 and joined the European Professional Golfers Association. Faldo achieved instant European Tour successes, finishing eighth on the Order of Merit in 1977, and third in 1978; and winning a European Tour event in each of those seasons (in 1977, he became the then-youngest Ryder Cup player at the age of 20). As a rookie, Faldo won all three of his matches at the 1977 Ryder Cup including a win over Jack Nicklaus and an astonishing singles victory over Tom Watson, who had just won the 1977 Open Championship two months earlier. Faldo continued his European Tour successes in the early 1980s, winning two consecutive Sun Alliance PGA Championships in England, in 1980 and 1981. Faldo finished top of the Order of Merit in 1983, with five European Tour victories.

In the mid-1980s, Faldo began rebuilding his swing under the tutelage of David Leadbetter, to reorder his game and become a regular contender in major championships. Some contemporaries and commentators viewed his all-encompassing swing change as excessive. Leadbetter felt that although Faldo's swing "looked beautiful," and had "marvelous rhythm," it "camouflaged a number of faults". After a series of setbacks, Faldo's efforts paid off in May 1987, when he won the Peugeot Spanish Open, his first European Tour victory since 1984 (Faldo later said the win was a "major turning point," which restored his confidence).

In July 1987, Faldo claimed his first major title at The Open Championship at Muirfield. After rounds of 68 (-3) and 69 (-2), Faldo emerged through stormy conditions with an even-par 71, thus entering the final round one stroke behind American Paul Azinger. Faldo parred every hole in his final round for a one-shot victory. At one point Azinger held a lead of three shots with nine holes to play, but bogeys at four of his last nine holes, including at the 17th and 18th, placed him a stroke behind Faldo. In cool misty weather conditions, Faldo's solid and steady play in the final round won him the Open title a day after his 30th birthday. He holed a five-foot putt on the final hole for his 18th consecutive par. Faldo later said: "I knew I'd do it. And I knew I had to do it." Highlighting a bunker shot on the 8th hole as a key shot of his final round, Faldo said: "The one at 8 was fantastic, a 35-yard shot and I knocked it to three feet."

At the 1988 U.S. Open, Faldo ended 72 holes of regulation play in a tie for the lead with Curtis Strange. Faldo's even-par fourth round of 71 started with 14 consecutive pars. A birdie on the 15th hole gave him a share of the lead with Strange. However, on the 16th hole Faldo found himself with a difficult bunker shot to play. After backing away from his bunker shot to scold some photographers for talking, Faldo made his lone bogey. Strange dropped a shot on the 17th to leave the two rivals tied for the lead on the 18th tee. Faldo missed a 25-foot birdie putt on the 18th green which would have made him the first British player since Tony Jacklin in 1970 to hold both major national championships. The following day, Strange won the 18-hole Monday playoff by four strokes. Strange shot an even-par round of 71, while Faldo struggled with a round of 75.

Faldo won his second major championship at the 1989 Masters. Starting his fourth round five shots off the lead held by Ben Crenshaw, Faldo's final round of 65 (consisting of eight birdies, nine pars and one bogey) was the low round of the tournament and enabled him to get into a playoff with Scott Hoch. Displaying some brilliant putting in his final round, Faldo holed a 50-foot birdie putt on the first hole and followed this up with birdies on the 2nd, 4th and 7th holes. On the back nine, Faldo two-putted from 15 feet for birdie on the 13th hole, then holed birdie putts of 5 feet at the 14th, 15 feet (with an 8-foot break) at the 16th, and 30 feet at the 17th. On the first hole of the ensuing sudden-death playoff, Hoch missed a 2-foot par putt that would have won him the tournament. On the 2nd playoff hole, amid the growing evening darkness, Faldo holed a 25-foot birdie putt to win the tournament.

At the 1990 Masters, Faldo successfully defended his title. He came from behind to get into a playoff with Raymond Floyd, once again winning on the second playoff hole after Floyd pulled his approach shot into a pond left of the green. Faldo became the first player to win back-to-back Masters titles since Jack Nicklaus in 1965–66.

In the next major at the 1990 U.S. Open at Medinah Country Club, Faldo finished tied for 3rd place. In his final round of 69 he three-putted from 45 feet on the 16th hole for a bogey and missed a 12-foot birdie putt on the 18th, which lipped out of the hole. This resulted in him missing out by one stroke on an 18-hole playoff with Hale Irwin and Mike Donald. Faldo refused to come to the press tent after his final round and later, en route to the locker room, snapped at a journalist who suggested that he had hit his putt too hard on the final green. Faldo said: "I hit it perfect. I hit a foot past the hole. How can you say I hit it too hard?"

The following month, Faldo won his second Open Championship at St Andrews, Scotland, by five shots, becoming the first golfer since Tom Watson in 1982 to win two majors in the same year.

Faldo won the famous Claret Jug trophy for a third time in the 1992 Open Championship at Muirfield. Faldo's first two rounds of 66-64 for a 36-hole total of 130 broke the Open Championship record for the lowest first 36 holes (a record later tied by Brandt Snedeker in 2012). Faldo had a 54-hole lead of four shots in the 1992 Open, before losing the lead during the back-nine of the final round to American John Cook. Faldo recovered with birdies on two of the last four holes to win by a stroke over Cook, who bogeyed the 72nd hole.

Perceived by some golf fans to be an aloof stoic character in the mould of Ben Hogan, Faldo displayed visible emotion after his Open-winning putt on the final hole at Muirfield in 1992, trembling and shedding tears. Faldo later said: "I thought I'd blown it. If I had lost, I would have needed a very large plaster to patch that one up."

Faldo claimed the European Tour Order of Merit a second time in 1992. During that time, Faldo said of his success: "The run doesn't have to end. If someone is going to beat me then I'm going to make sure they've worked for their victory. Let them come and get it from me." That year, he had worldwide earnings of £1,558,978, breaking the existing record.

In July 1993, Faldo won the Carroll's Irish Open for an unprecedented third time in a row. Starting his final round four shots behind José María Olazábal, Faldo's fourth round of 65 enabled him to tie over 72 holes with Olazábal. Faldo won the sudden death playoff at the first extra hole. Later that month, as defending Open champion, Faldo was involved in a memorable duel with rival Greg Norman in the Open Championship at Royal St George's Golf Club. Starting his final round one shot ahead of Norman, Faldo hit a tee shot on the par-3 11th which appeared to be heading for a hole in one, but the ball hit the cup and rolled away. Faldo played some excellent golf in his final round of 67, but he finished runner-up, two strokes behind Norman, who shot a spectacular final round of 64.

=== PGA Tour ===
Throughout the early 1990s, Faldo remained a European Tour player while also visiting America regularly and playing events around the world, but in 1995 he decided to concentrate on playing on the U.S. PGA Tour, as his priority was to win further major championships (and three out of the four majors are played in the United States). At first this strategy didn't seem to work, as he had a moderate 1995 season, but in April 1996 he won a famous victory at Augusta to collect his sixth and final major championship.

Faldo went into the final round at the 1996 Masters trailing Greg Norman by six shots, but was the beneficiary of an infamous Sunday collapse at Augusta by Norman; Faldo shot a 67 to win by five over Norman, who struggled mightily en route to a 78. Though this is commonly remembered as the tournament where Norman collapsed in the final round, Faldo's 67 was a memorable display of concentration and consistency which put pressure on Norman. After Faldo finished, he hugged Norman and whispered something in his ear, which years later Norman confirmed to have included the line "Don't let the bastards get you down", a reference to the media, which Faldo assumed would aggressively hound Norman for the loss. Norman said in interview after defeat that "He (Faldo) had gone way, way up in my estimations." Since then they had become friends and fishing partners, a passion they both share. However, in a 2026 interview Norman was less than enthusiastic about his relationship with Faldo.

After Faldo's victory at the 1996 Masters, he had just one further tournament win in his career at the 1997 Nissan Open in Los Angeles, at the age of 39. As Faldo entered his forties, his form gradually declined and he devoted more time to off-course activities. The last season that he played regularly on the PGA Tour was 2001. Afterwards, he refocused on the European Tour and consistently played less than a full schedule.

At the 2002 U.S. Open, a month before his 45th birthday, Faldo finished in a very creditable position of tied for 5th place. At the 2003 Open Championship at Royal St George's, Faldo shot a fine third round of 67 and was briefly in contention for the tournament during the final round. He closed to within two shots of the lead after a birdie at the 5th hole in the final round before holing a 30-foot eagle putt on the 7th. However, his momentum stalled over the next three holes. A birdie at the 14th hole took him to level par and into fourth place. However, three successive bogeys on his subsequent three holes ended his challenge and he finished the tournament in a tie for eighth place. It was Faldo's last top-10 finish in a major championship.

=== Broadcasting career ===
After cutting back on his playing schedule, Faldo became a broadcaster for ABC Sports' PGA Tour coverage, where he worked from 2004 to 2006 alongside former playing rival Paul Azinger and host Mike Tirico. While never considered to be a particularly charismatic player, Faldo surprised many fans with his dry, British wit and insightful commentary as part of the ABC team. The trio garnered many positive reviews, with Faldo and Azinger often exchanging verbal barbs and engaging in humorous banter.

On 3 October 2006, it was announced that Faldo had signed a contract with CBS to replace Lanny Wadkins as the network's lead golf analyst. Faldo said, "I view this as a fabulous opportunity for me, which may come once every ten years. But it will seriously curtail my playing career. My playing days aren't completely over but my priority now is given to CBS." Faldo's decision meant he missed the 2007 Masters, an event he had won three times. In 2007 he also became the lead analyst for Golf Channel's coverage on the PGA Tour. Faldo has garnered less positive support since he began working on his own. He and Azinger did have a pair of reunion telecasts, one for each of the analysts' employers. Faldo joined Azinger and Tirico on ABC for the 2007 Open Championship. Meanwhile, Azinger joined Faldo and Brian Hammons on Golf Channel for the 2009 Presidents Cup.

Faldo did occasionally play golf tournaments during this era. After 2005, Faldo's appearances in professional tournaments became increasingly sporadic. In 2006, apart from appearances in the Masters and at the Open Championship, Faldo played in two events on the European Tour that year. In the first half of 2007, Faldo did not appear in any regular tour events. He did play in the 2007 Open at Carnoustie, missing the cut. In his first Champions Tour event, he finished tied for 14th in the Senior British Open.

Faldo did not take part in the 2008 Open at Royal Birkdale. It was the first time he had not taken part in the competition since failing to qualify as an amateur in 1975. He entered in 2009 at Turnberry and 2010 at St Andrews, but missed the 36-hole cut at both. Faldo opted not to take part in the 2011 Open at Royal St George's. He also decided not to compete in the 2012 Open, instead joining the BBC Sport commentary team for the event. Faldo competed at the 2013 Open at Muirfield. He missed the cut. Faldo decided to make the 2015 Open at St Andrews his final Open Championship appearance.

Faldo retired from CBS after 16 years in the broadcast booth; his final regular broadcast was at the Wyndham Championship, in August 2022.

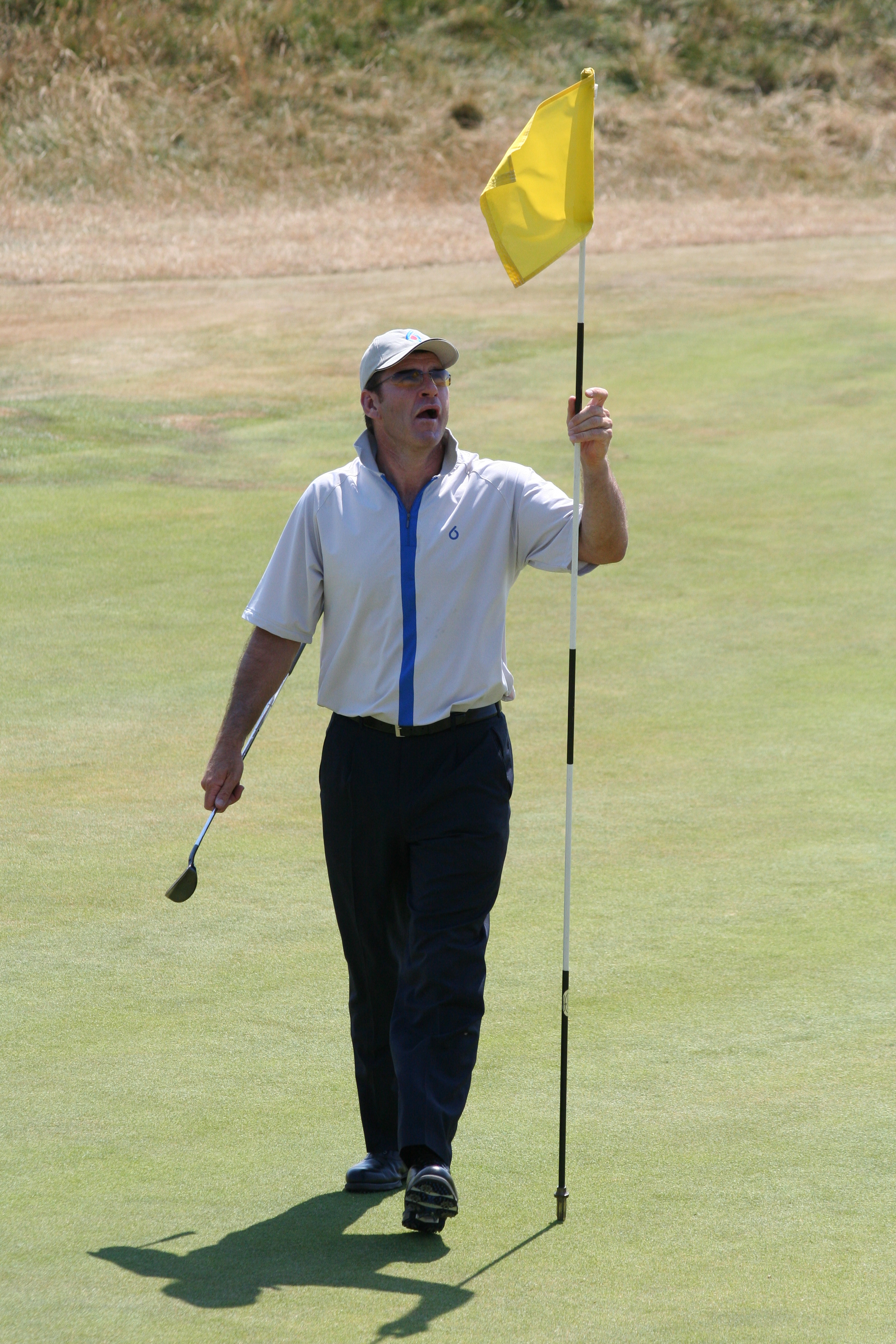
Faldo in July 2008

=== Achievements and legacy ===
Faldo won more major golf championships than any player from Europe since World War I , an achievement tied by Rory Mcilroy at the 2026 Masters. Only one European golfer, Harry Vardon, who won seven majors between 1896 and 1914, has had more major victories than Faldo. Gary Player (from South Africa) is the only other player from outside the United States who has won more majors than Faldo.

Faldo was named the PGA Tour Player of the Year in 1990 and the European Tour Player of the Year in 1989, 1990 and 1992, and has won 29 European Tour titles. He spent a total of 97 weeks at the top of the Official World Golf Ranking, surpassed by only Greg Norman during the 1990s. Faldo is one of the most successful Ryder Cup players ever, having won 25 points and having represented the European Team a record 11 times. He played a key role in making Europe competitive in the event. Having won 23 of his matches, lost 19, and halved 4, he also holds the European record for having played the most Ryder Cup matches.

In 2000, Faldo was ranked 18th greatest golfer of all time by Golf Digest magazine. In a 2019 article on England's best golfers, Golf Monthly described Faldo as "arguably the greatest English player of all time".

Former Walker Cup captain Peter McEvoy said of Faldo: "He is a leading contender to be Britain's finest ever sportsman in an individual sport. He is the gold standard from which the rest of modern British golf has to be judged." In 2003, PGA chief executive Sandy Jones said of Faldo's career: "His career achievements position him as Britain's best golfer of all time. But it is his dedication and commitment to the game which really sets him apart."

Faldo's longtime caddie was Fanny Sunesson, who carried his bag on four of his six Major wins.

== Playing style ==
Faldo's composure under pressure and intimidating presence were hallmarks of his game. His final round of 18 consecutive pars at the 1987 Open Championship was an example of steady play under pressure. It has been suggested that Faldo wore down his opposition and benefited from other players making mistakes in pressure-filled situations. His three Masters titles came after mistakes by Scott Hoch missing a short putt in 1989, Raymond Floyd hitting into a pond in 1990 and from a collapse by Greg Norman in 1996. Two of Faldo's Open Championship wins came after mistakes in the closing two holes by Paul Azinger in 1987 and John Cook in 1992. His Open Championship in 1990 was effectively decided when Norman shot 76 to his 67 in the third round.

Although not a particularly powerful player for a tall man, Faldo's strengths included his distance control, course management and his strong competitive mind. His intense dedication to the game meant that he attended to every detail in the golf swing. Gary Player said of Faldo: "He had a work ethic that was quite unbelievable."

After Faldo changed his swing in the mid-1980s, his methodical style gave him a reputation for being one of the game's more conservative players. BBC commentator Peter Alliss suggested that much of the flair in Faldo's game was lost in the mid-1980s when he remodelled his swing. Alliss said: "Faldo had cut out the excitement, but he had also eradicated the mistakes."

Faldo also had a reputation of having an intense focus and not engaging in too many social courtesies. In 1998, Faldo's partnership with David Leadbetter came to an end when Faldo dispensed with his services in a letter. In 2003, Leadbetter said of Faldo: "He wasn't the most popular guy with all the players, that's for sure. He didn't go out to win friends and influence people. Very seldom does he call people by name. He was very difficult to get close to. But I don't think it hurt his performance. You don't have to be 'Mr Popular' to win golf tournaments."

Faldo's strong work ethic was praised by Leadbetter, who said that during uncomfortably hot conditions in the summer heat of Florida, a conservative estimate of Faldo's practice levels would be him hitting "500–800 balls a day, every day". Leadbetter said: "I don't know how many balls we hit in total but it was thousands and thousands. He also kept up his short game too – he worked hard on that aspect of his game."

In an interview in 2005, Curtis Strange said: "Nick Faldo stared a lot of guys down. He had a way of folding his arms and looking at you as though he knew you were going to make a mistake. But in our playoff in the 1988 U.S. Open, I was in a good frame of mind to handle him. We didn't say three words all day, which was fine with me. I'm proud of beating him when he was in his prime."

Nick Dougherty, who won three Faldo Junior Series events and went on to win tournaments on the European Tour, said of Faldo: "He's the most driven human being I've ever known. People say Tiger Woods created the new breed of golfer but I believe Nick Faldo did."

In 1990, British golf writer Peter Dobereiner suggested that Faldo was "obsessively driven by the impossible dream of technical perfection."

== 2008 Ryder Cup captaincy ==
Faldo was selected as captain of the European Ryder Cup team in 2008. The 37th Ryder Cup, held at the Valhalla Golf Club in Louisville, Kentucky, USA, was won 16½ – 11½ by Team USA to end the streak of three successive victories for Team Europe.

Faldo had picked Ian Poulter as a wild card ahead of Darren Clarke, who already had two tour victories that season. This decision paid off when Poulter emerged as the top scorer in the tournament.

On the final day of the competition, Faldo decided to play a tactic, where the best players would start lower down the order; thus, if it went to a close finish, Europe would have its best players in play. This tactic seemed to backfire, as the US, leading by 2 at the start of the day, gained the 5 points they required by the eighth match, rendering the last four irrelevant.

== Other activities ==
In 1991, Faldo launched his golf course design practice Faldo Design. Known golf design associates of Faldo Design have been Paul Jansen, Steve Smyers, Adam Calver.

The following is a partial list of courses designed by Faldo:

- OD denotes courses for which Faldo is the original designer
- R denotes courses reconstructed by Faldo
- A denotes courses for which Faldo made substantial additions
- E denotes courses that Faldo examined and on the construction of which he consulted

Name	Contribution	Year built	City / Town	State / Province	Country	Comments
Marriott's Shadow Ridge GC	OD		Palm Desert	California	United States	
Cottonwood Hills	OD		Hutchinson	Kansas	United States	Extinct
Wilderness Club	OD		Eureka	Montana	United States	
Angkor GR	OD		Siem Reap	Siem Reap Province	Cambodia	
The Fortress at Louisbourg Resort	OD		Cape Breton Island	Nova Scotia	Canada	Extinct
Mission Hills GC (Faldo Course)	OD	1999	Shenzhen	Guangdong	China	
Elea Estate GC	OD		Geroskipou	Paphos District	Cyprus	
Ledreborg Palace GC (Faldo Course)	OD	2007	Roskilde	Region Zealand	Denmark	
Roco Ki Resort	OD		Punta Cana	La Altagracia	Dominican Republic	Extinct
Chart Hills GC	OD	1993	Biddenden	Kent	England	
A-Rosa Resort – Faldo Berlin	OD	1996	Bad Saarow	Brandenburg	Germany	Formerly known as Sporting Club Berlin (Faldo Course)
Ballyliffin GC	OD		Ballyliffin	County Donegal	Ireland	
Ventanas GC	OD	2010	San Miguel de Allende	Guanajuato	Mexico	
Lough Erne GR (Faldo Course)	OD		Enniskillen	County Fermanagh	Northern Ireland	
Rumanza G&CC	OD	2020	Multan	Punjab	Pakistan	
The Eagle Ridge G&CC	OD		General Trias	Cavite	Philippines	
Amendoeira (Faldo Course)	OD		Morgado da Lameira	Faro	Portugal	
Emirates GC (Faldo Course)	OD		Dubai	Emirate of Dubai	United Arab Emirates	
Laguna Lang Co GC	OD		Phú Lộc	Thừa Thiên Huế	Vietnam	
Silk Path Dong Trieu	OD	2025	Hanoi	Red River Delta	Vietnam	

Faldo's other business interests include coaching schools and pro shops. In 1996 he launched the Faldo Series to provide opportunities to golfers under the age of 21 from around the world, both male and female. There are over 7,000 participants each year and there are 38 tournaments in 28 countries. Age category winners at each event qualify for either the Faldo Series Grand Final, hosted each year by Faldo at the Lough Erne Golf Resort, Northern Ireland or the Faldo Series Asia Grand Final, also hosted by Faldo at Mission Hills Golf Club, Shenzhen, China (A Faldo Design course). The registered charity boasts a number of successful graduates, the most notable being; Rory McIlroy, Yani Tseng, and Nick Dougherty.

Along with the Marriott hotel chain, Faldo established The Faldo Golf Institute in 1997. This is a golf instructional programme designed to help golfers of every level improve their skills and enjoyment of golf. The institute has five locations: Orlando, Florida; Atlantic City, New Jersey; Palm Desert, California; Marco Island, Florida; and Hertfordshire, UK.

In 2007, Mercedes-Benz signed Faldo as a brand ambassador to promote the revival of the Maybach brand of ultra-luxury automobiles.

Faldo has written several golf instructional books.

== Awards and honours ==
Faldo was voted BBC Sports Personality of the Year in 1989. He was inducted into the World Golf Hall of Fame in 1998.

Faldo was appointed Member of the Order of the British Empire (MBE) in the 1988 New Year Honours, then made a Knight Bachelor in the 2009 Birthday Honours, on both occasions “for services to golf”.

Faldo was announced as the 2014 recipient of the Payne Stewart Award on 9 September 2014.

== Personal life ==
Faldo has been married four times. He met his first wife, Melanie Rockall, when he was 21. They married in 1979 and separated less than five years later.

He married Gill Bennett in 1986 and the couple had three children: two daughters and a son. The marriage ended in 1995 after Faldo began a relationship with 20-year-old American golfing student Brenna Cepelak.

Faldo's three-year relationship with Cepelak ended when he met Valerie Bercher, a Swiss PR agent working for marketing company IMG. She married Faldo in July 2001 in a lavish ceremony at his Windsor home. They have a daughter, born in 2003. It was announced in May 2006 that Faldo had filed for divorce.

Faldo married his fourth wife, Lindsay De Marco, in December 2020 in the Florida Keys, after their planned wedding at Kensington Palace had to be called off due to the COVID-19 pandemic.

Faldo lives on Faldo Farm outside Bozeman, Montana, United States.

== Professional wins (43) ==
=== PGA Tour wins (9) ===
Legend
Major championships (6)
Other PGA Tour (3)

No.	Date	Tournament	Winning score	Margin of victory	Runner(s)-up
1	22 Apr 1984	Sea Pines Heritage	−14 (66-67-68-69=270)	1 stroke	(United States) Tom Kite
2	19 Jul 1987	The Open Championship	−5 (69-68-71-71=279)	1 stroke	(United States) Paul Azinger, (Australia) Rodger Davis
3	9 Apr 1989	Masters Tournament	−5 (68-73-77-65=283)	Playoff	(United States) Scott Hoch
4	8 Apr 1990	Masters Tournament (2)	−10 (71-72-66-69=278)	Playoff	(United States) Raymond Floyd
5	22 Jul 1990	The Open Championship (2)	−18 (67-65-67-71=270)	5 strokes	(Zimbabwe) Mark McNulty, (United States) Payne Stewart
6	19 Jul 1992	The Open Championship (3)	−12 (66-64-69-73=272)	1 stroke	(United States) John Cook
7	5 Mar 1995	Doral-Ryder Open	−15 (67-71-66-69=273)	1 stroke	(United States) Peter Jacobsen, (Australia) Greg Norman
8	14 Apr 1996	Masters Tournament (3)	−12 (69-67-73-67=276)	5 strokes	(Australia) Greg Norman
9	2 Mar 1997	Nissan Open	−12 (66-70-68-68=272)	3 strokes	(United States) Craig Stadler

PGA Tour playoff record (2–1)

No.	Year	Tournament	Opponent	Result
1	1988	U.S. Open	(United States) Curtis Strange	Lost 18-hole playoff; Strange: E (71), Faldo: +4 (75)
2	1989	Masters Tournament	(United States) Scott Hoch	Won with birdie on second extra hole
3	1990	Masters Tournament	(United States) Raymond Floyd	Won with par on second extra hole

=== European Tour wins (30) ===
Legend
Major championships (6)
Tour Championships (1)
Other European Tour (23)

No.	Date	Tournament	Winning score	Margin of victory	Runner(s)-up
1	17 Aug 1977	Skol Lager Individual	−5 (68-71=139)	Playoff	(Wales) Craig Defoy, (Australia) Chris Witcher (a)
2	29 May 1978	Colgate PGA Championship	−10 (71-68-70-69=278)	7 strokes	(Scotland) Ken Brown
3	26 May 1980	Sun Alliance PGA Championship (2)	+3 (73-70-71-69=283)	1 stroke	(Scotland) Ken Brown
4	25 May 1981	Sun Alliance PGA Championship (3)	−10 (68-70-67-69=274)	4 strokes	(Scotland) Ken Brown, (England) Neil Coles
5	19 Sep 1982	Haig Whisky TPC	−18 (69-67-65-69=270)	3 strokes	(Spain) Manuel Calero
6	8 May 1983	Paco Rabanne Open de France	−11 (69-67-72-69=277)	Playoff	(Spain) José María Cañizares, (England) David J. Russell
7	15 May 1983	Martini International	−12 (67-69-66-66=268)	Playoff	(Spain) José María Cañizares
8	22 May 1983	Car Care Plan International	−8 (67-68-68-69=272)	1 stroke	(England) Howard Clark, (England) Brian Waites
9	24 Jul 1983	Lawrence Batley International	−18 (71-69-64-62=266)	4 strokes	(England) Warren Humphreys, (England) Brian Waites, (England) Paul Way
10	11 Sep 1983	Ebel European Masters Swiss Open	−20 (70-64-68-66=268)	Playoff	(Scotland) Sandy Lyle
11	13 May 1984	Car Care Plan International (2)	−12 (69-70-66-71=276)	1 stroke	(England) Howard Clark
12	17 May 1987	Peugeot Spanish Open	−2 (72-71-71-72=286)	2 strokes	(South Africa) Hugh Baiocchi, (Spain) Seve Ballesteros
13	19 Jul 1987	The Open Championship	−5 (68-69-71-71=279)	1 stroke	(United States) Paul Azinger, (Australia) Rodger Davis
14	26 Jun 1988	Peugeot Open de France (2)	−6 (71-67-68-68=274)	2 strokes	(England) Denis Durnian, (Australia) Wayne Riley
15	30 Oct 1988	Volvo Masters	−4 (74-71-71-68=284)	2 strokes	(Spain) Seve Ballesteros
16	9 Apr 1989	Masters Tournament	−5 (68-73-77-65=283)	Playoff	(United States) Scott Hoch
17	30 May 1989	Volvo PGA Championship (4)	−16 (67-69-69-67=272)	2 strokes	(Wales) Ian Woosnam
18	4 Jun 1989	Dunhill British Masters	−21 (71-65-65-66=267)	4 strokes	(Northern Ireland) Ronan Rafferty
19	2 Jul 1989	Peugeot Open de France (3)	−7 (70-70-64-69=273)	1 stroke	(South Africa) Hugh Baiocchi, (West Germany) Bernhard Langer, (England) Mark Roe
20	8 Apr 1990	Masters Tournament (2)	−10 (71-72-66-69=278)	Playoff	(United States) Raymond Floyd
21	22 Jul 1990	The Open Championship (2)	−18 (67-65-67-71=270)	5 strokes	(Zimbabwe) Mark McNulty, (United States) Payne Stewart
22	23 Jun 1991	Carroll's Irish Open	−5 (68-75-70-70=283)	3 strokes	(Scotland) Colin Montgomerie
23	7 Jun 1992	Carroll's Irish Open (2)	−14 (66-65-68-75=274)	Playoff	(South Africa) Wayne Westner
24	19 Jul 1992	The Open Championship (3)	−12 (66-64-69-73=272)	1 stroke	(United States) John Cook
25	2 Aug 1992	Scandinavian Masters	−11 (70-72-66-69=277)	3 strokes	(Australia) Robert Allenby, (England) Peter Baker, (Canada) Danny Mijovic, (New Zealand) Frank Nobilo, (Spain) José María Olazábal, (Australia) Peter O'Malley
26	13 Sep 1992	GA European Open	−18 (67-66-64-65=262)	3 strokes	(Sweden) Robert Karlsson
27	7 Feb 1993	Johnnie Walker Classic	−11 (67-68-66-68=269)	1 stroke	(Scotland) Colin Montgomerie
28	4 Jul 1993	Carroll's Irish Open (3)	−12 (72-67-72-65=276)	Playoff	(Spain) José María Olazábal
29	5 Jun 1994	Alfred Dunhill Open	−5 (67-74-67-71=279)	Playoff	(Sweden) Joakim Haeggman
30	14 Apr 1996	Masters Tournament (3)	−12 (69-67-73-67=276)	5 strokes	(Australia) Greg Norman

European Tour playoff record (9–4)

No.	Year	Tournament	Opponent(s)	Result
1	1977	Uniroyal International Championship	(Spain) Seve Ballesteros	Lost to birdie on first extra hole
2	1977	Skol Lager Individual	(Wales) Craig Defoy, (Australia) Chris Witcher (a)	Won with birdie on first extra hole
3	1983	Paco Rabanne Open de France	(Spain) José María Cañizares, (England) David J. Russell	Won with par on third extra hole Russell eliminated by birdie on first hole
4	1983	Martini International	(Spain) José María Cañizares	Won with par on third extra hole
5	1983	Ebel European Masters Swiss Open	(Scotland) Sandy Lyle	Won with par on second extra hole
6	1988	Torras Hostench Barcelona Open	(England) Barry Lane, (Wales) Mark Mouland, (England) David Whelan	Whelan won with par on fourth extra hole Faldo and Mouland eliminated by birdie on first hole
7	1988	U.S. Open	(United States) Curtis Strange	Lost 18-hole playoff; Strange: E (71), Faldo: +4 (75)
8	1988	Benson & Hedges International Open	(England) Peter Baker	Lost to eagle on second extra hole
9	1989	Masters Tournament	(United States) Scott Hoch	Won with birdie on second extra hole
10	1990	Masters Tournament	(United States) Raymond Floyd	Won with par on second extra hole
11	1992	Carroll's Irish Open	(South Africa) Wayne Westner	Won after concession on fourth extra hole
12	1993	Carroll's Irish Open	(Spain) José María Olazábal	Won with par on first extra hole
13	1994	Alfred Dunhill Open	(Sweden) Joakim Haeggman	Won with par on first extra hole

=== Southern Africa Tour wins (1) ===
No.	Date	Tournament	Winning score	Margin of victory	Runner-up
1	17 Nov 1979	ICL International	−16 (68-66-69-65=268)	3 strokes	(South Africa) Allan Henning

=== Other wins (9) ===
No.	Date	Tournament	Winning score	Margin of victory	Runner(s)-up
1	25 Sep 1977	Donald Swaelens Memorial Tournament	−11 (69-69-70=208)	2 strokes	(Spain) Seve Ballesteros, (United States) Billy Casper
2	10 Sep 1978	Donald Swaelens Memorial Tournament (2)	−10 (69-72-68=209)	Playoff	(Spain) Seve Ballesteros
3	15 Oct 1989	Suntory World Match Play Championship	1 up		(Wales) Ian Woosnam
4	15 Dec 1990	Johnnie Walker Asian Classic	−14 (72-68-62-68=270)	4 strokes	(Wales) Ian Woosnam
5	11 Oct 1992	Toyota World Match Play Championship (2)	8 and 7		(United States) Jeff Sluman
6	20 Dec 1992	Johnnie Walker World Golf Championship	−6 (71-70-65-68=274)	Playoff	(Australia) Greg Norman
7	4 Dec 1994	Nedbank Million Dollar Challenge	−16 (66-64-73-69=272)	3 strokes	(Zimbabwe) Nick Price
8	30 Jul 1995	Telus Skins Game	$160,000	$50,000	(United States) Ben Crenshaw
9	22 Nov 1998	World Cup of Golf (with (England) David Carter)	−8 (141-141-149-137=568)	2 strokes	Italy − Massimo Florioli and Costantino Rocca

Other playoff record (2–0)

No.	Year	Tournament	Opponent	Result
1	1978	Donald Swaelens Memorial Tournament	(Spain) Seve Ballesteros	Won with birdie on second extra hole
2	1992	Johnnie Walker World Golf Championship	(Australia) Greg Norman	Won with par on first extra hole

== Major championships ==
=== Wins (6) ===
Year	Championship	54 holes	Winning score	Margin	Runner(s)-up
1987	The Open Championship	1 shot deficit	−5 (68-69-71-71=279)	1 stroke	(United States) Paul Azinger, (Australia) Rodger Davis
1989	Masters Tournament	5 shot deficit	−5 (68-73-77-65=283)	Playoff^{1}	(United States) Scott Hoch
1990	Masters Tournament (2)	3 shot deficit	−10 (71-72-66-69=278)	Playoff^{2}	(United States) Raymond Floyd
1990	The Open Championship (2)	5 shot lead	−18 (67-65-67-71=270)	5 strokes	(Zimbabwe) Mark McNulty, (United States) Payne Stewart
1992	The Open Championship (3)	4 shot lead	−12 (66-64-69-73=272)	1 stroke	(United States) John Cook
1996	Masters Tournament (3)	6 shot deficit	−12 (69-67-73-67=276)	5 strokes	(Australia) Greg Norman

^{1}Defeated Scott Hoch in a sudden-death playoff: Faldo (5-3) and Hoch (5-x).
^{2}Defeated Raymond Floyd in a sudden-death playoff: Faldo (4-4) and Floyd (4-x).

=== Results timeline ===
Tournament	1976	1977	1978	1979
Masters Tournament				40
U.S. Open				
The Open Championship	T28	T62	T7	T19
PGA Championship				

Tournament	1980	1981	1982	1983	1984	1985	1986	1987	1988	1989
Masters Tournament				T20	T15	T25			T30	1
U.S. Open					T55				2	T18
The Open Championship	T12	T11	T4	T8	T6	T54	5	1	3	T11
PGA Championship			T14	CUT	T20	T54	CUT	T28	T4	T9

Tournament	1990	1991	1992	1993	1994	1995	1996	1997	1998	1999
Masters Tournament	1	T12	T13	T39	32	T24	1	CUT	CUT	CUT
U.S. Open	T3	T16	T4	T72	CUT	T45	T16	T48	CUT	CUT
The Open Championship	1	T17	1	2	T8	T40	4	T51	T44	CUT
PGA Championship	T19	T16	T2	3	T4	T31	T65	CUT	T54	T41

Tournament	2000	2001	2002	2003	2004	2005	2006	2007	2008	2009
Masters Tournament	T28	CUT	T14	T33	CUT	WD	CUT			
U.S. Open	7	T72	T5	CUT	CUT					
The Open Championship	T41	CUT	T59	T8	CUT	T11	CUT	CUT		CUT
PGA Championship	T51	T51	T60		T49					

Tournament	2010	2011	2012	2013	2014	2015
Masters Tournament						
U.S. Open						
The Open Championship	CUT			CUT	CUT	CUT
PGA Championship						

Win
Top 10
Did not play

WD = withdrew
CUT = missed the halfway cut
"T" indicates a tie for a place.

=== Summary ===
Tournament	Wins	2nd	3rd	Top-5	Top-10	Top-25	Events	Cuts made
Masters Tournament	3	0	0	3	3	9	23	16
U.S. Open	0	1	1	4	5	8	18	13
The Open Championship	3	1	1	8	13	19	37	27
PGA Championship	0	1	1	4	5	9	22	19
Totals	6	3	3	19	26	45	100	75

- Most consecutive cuts made – 27 (1987 Open Championship – 1994 Masters)
- Longest streak of top-10s – 4 (1988 U.S. Open – 1989 Masters and 1989 PGA – 1990 Open Championship)

== Results in The Players Championship ==
Tournament	1982	1983	1984	1985	1986	1987	1988	1989
The Players Championship	T35	T35	T20	CUT	CUT		CUT	

Tournament	1990	1991	1992	1993	1994	1995	1996	1997	1998	1999
The Players Championship		T57	T2		5	CUT	CUT	T24	T18	DQ

Tournament	2000	2001	2002	2003	2004	2005	2006
The Players Championship	T53	T50	T49	T39	T72	T27	CUT

Top 10
Did not play

CUT = missed the halfway cut
DQ = disqualified
"T" indicates a tie for a place

== Results in World Golf Championships ==
Tournament	1999	2000	2001	2002	2003
Match Play	R64				
Championship			NT^{1}		
Invitational					T82

^{1}Cancelled due to 9/11

Did not play

QF, R16, R32, R64 = Round in which player lost in match play
"T" = Tied
NT = No tournament

== Team appearances ==
Amateur

- Commonwealth Tournament (representing Great Britain): 1975

Professional

- Ryder Cup (representing GB & Ireland / Europe): 1977, 1979, 1981, 1983, 1985 (winners), 1987 (winners), 1989 (tied match and retained trophy), 1991, 1993, 1995 (winners), 1997 (winners), 2008 (non-playing captain)
- World Cup (representing England): 1977, 1991, 1998 (winners)
- Double Diamond International (representing England): 1977
- Hennessy Cognac Cup (representing Great Britain & Ireland): 1978 (winners), 1980 (winners), 1982 (winners), (representing England) 1984 (winners, captain)
- Dunhill Cup (representing England): 1985, 1986, 1987 (winners), 1988, 1991, 1993
- Four Tours World Championship (representing Europe): 1986, 1987, 1990 (captain)
- UBS Cup (representing the Rest of the World): 2001, 2002, 2003 (tie)
- Royal Trophy (representing Europe): 2006 (winners)
- Seve Trophy (representing Great Britain & Ireland): 2007 (non-playing captain – winners)

Ryder Cup points record
1977	1979	1981	1983	1985	1987	1989	1991	1993	1995	1997	Total
3	3	1	4	0	3.5	2.5	1	3	2	2	25

== See also ==
- List of celebrities who own wineries and vineyards
- List of golfers with most European Tour wins
- List of men's major championships winning golfers
- List of World Number One male golfers
