= Payne Stewart Award =

Professional golf sportsmanship award

The Payne Stewart Award is an award given by the PGA Tour and presented by Southern Company since the award's inception in 2000. The award, given annually the week of the Tour Championship at East Lake Golf Club, is in honor of World Golf Hall of Famer Payne Stewart.

The Payne Stewart Award is given to a player whose "values align with the character, charity and sportsmanship that Stewart showed". This includes respect for the traditions of the game, commitment to uphold the game's heritage of charitable support and professional and meticulous presentation of himself and the sport through his dress and conduct.

== Winners ==
- 2026 (United States) Notah Begay III
- 2025 (United States) Paul Azinger
- 2024 (United States) Brandt Snedeker
- 2023 (United States) Gary Koch
- 2022 (United States) Billy Andrade
- 2021 (England) Justin Rose
- 2020 (United States) Zach Johnson
- 2019 (United States) Hale Irwin
- 2018 (Germany) Bernhard Langer
- 2017 (United States) Stewart Cink
- 2016 (United States) Jim Furyk
- 2015 (South Africa) Ernie Els
- 2014 (England) Nick Faldo
- 2013 (United States) Peter Jacobsen
- 2012 (United States) Steve Stricker
- 2011 (United States) David Toms
- 2010 (United States) Tom Lehman
- 2009 (United States) Kenny Perry
- 2008 (United States) Davis Love III
- 2007 (United States) Hal Sutton
- 2006 (South Africa) Gary Player
- 2005 (United States) Brad Faxon
- 2004 (United States) Jay Haas
- 2003 (United States) Tom Watson
- 2002 (Zimbabwe) Nick Price
- 2001 (United States) Ben Crenshaw
- 2000 (United States) Byron Nelson,
  (United States) Jack Nicklaus,
  (United States) Arnold Palmer
