= Dicky Thompson =

American professional golfer (born 1957)

Personal information
- Nationality: United States
- Born: June 13, 1957 (age 69) Atlanta, Georgia, U.S.
- Height: 5 ft 7 in (1.70 m)
- Weight: 160 lb (73 kg; 11 st)

Career
- Sport: Golf
- College: University of Georgia
- Turned professional: 1980
- Former tours: PGA Tour; Nationwide Tour; NGA Hooters Tour
- Professional wins: 11

Number of wins by tour
- Korn Ferry Tour: 2
- Other: 9

Best results in major championships
- Masters Tournament: DNP
- PGA Championship: DNP
- U.S. Open: CUT: 1991
- The Open Championship: CUT: 1988

Dicky Thompson (born June 13, 1957) is an American professional golfer who played on the PGA Tour and the Nationwide Tour.

== Career ==
In 1980, Thompson turned professional. Thompson played on the NGA Hooters Tour in the late 1980s. He won the Crown Colony Invitational in 1988 by six strokes over Marco Dawson and Brian Kamm. He qualified for the 1988 Open Championship during this era.

In 1990, Thompson joined the Ben Hogan Tour. He won the Ben Hogan Baton Rouge Open and the Ben Hogan Elizabethtown Open en route to an 8th-place finish on the money list which earned him his PGA Tour card for 1991. He did not perform well enough on his rookie year on Tour to retain his card but got his Tour card for 1992 through qualifying school. After another poor year on the PGA Tour, he took a hiatus. He played some on the NGA Hooters Tour again. He won two Hooters Tour tournaments during this timespan.

In late 1994, Thompson earned his PGA Tour card again through qualifying school. In 1995, Thompson did not do well enough to retain his card but did record his best finish on the PGA Tour of his career, finishing in a tie for fourth at the Deposit Guaranty Golf Classic. He took another hiatus from tour and played on the Hooters Tour again. He won his four Hooters Tour tournaments during this timespan.

In 1999, Thompson rejoined the PGA Tour's developmental tour again, now named the Nike Tour. He recorded five top-10 finishes. In 2000, he played on the developmental tour for the final time.

== Professional wins (11) ==
=== Ben Hogan Tour wins (2) ===
No.	Date	Tournament	Winning score	Margin of victory	Runner(s)-up
1	Mar 11, 1990	Ben Hogan Baton Rouge Open	−7 (67-67-75=209)	2 strokes	(United States) Carl Cooper, (United States) Dick Mast, (United States) Jim McGovern, (United States) Greg Whisman
2	May 20, 1990	Ben Hogan Elizabethtown Open	−11 (66-73-66=205)	Playoff	(United States) Jeff Maggert

Ben Hogan Tour playoff record (1–0)

No.	Year	Tournament	Opponent	Result
1	1990	Ben Hogan Elizabethtown Open	(United States) Jeff Maggert	Won with par on second extra hole

=== NGA Hooters Tour wins (7) ===
No.	Date	Tournament	Winning score	Margin of victory	Runner(s)-up
1	May 1, 1988	Crown Colony Invitational	−12 (70-67-67=204)	6 strokes	(United States) Marco Dawson, (United States) Brian Kamm
2	Apr 24, 1994	Bull Creek Classic	−18 (65-66-71-68=270)	5 strokes	(United States) Scott McCarron, (United States) Ricky Smallridge
3	Jul 3, 1994	WIHN Classic	−15 (68-68-67-66=269)	2 strokes	(United States) Greg Parker
4	Jul 14, 1996	NGA Hooters Classic	−15 (68-70-65-70=273)	Playoff	(United States) Casey Martin
5	May 4, 1997	NorthPark Mazda-Acura Classic	−16 (63-69-69-71=272)	5 strokes	(United States) David Wall
6	Aug 31, 1997	Hooters Classic	−15 (67-71-66-69=273)	1 stroke	(United States) Dean Larsson, (United States) Kelly Sellers
7	Mar 15, 1998	Hewlett Packard-Synnex Classic	−12 (69-69-70-68=276)	3 strokes	(United States) Michael Flynn

=== Other wins (2) ===
- 1998 Georgia Open
- 1999 Georgia Open

== Results in major championships ==
Tournament	1988	1989	1990	1991
U.S. Open				CUT
The Open Championship	CUT			

Did not play

CUT = missed the half-way cut
Note: Thompson never played in the Masters Tournament or the PGA Championship.

== See also ==
- 1990 PGA Tour Qualifying School graduates
- 1991 PGA Tour Qualifying School graduates
- 1994 PGA Tour Qualifying School graduates
