= Ben Hogan Baton Rouge Open =

Golf tournament

Tournament information
- Location: Baton Rouge, Louisiana
- Established: 1990
- Course: The Country Club of Louisiana
- Par: 72
- Tour: Ben Hogan Tour
- Format: Stroke play
- Prize fund: $100,000
- Month played: March
- Final year: 1990

Tournament record score
- Aggregate: 209 Dicky Thompson (1990)
- To par: −7 as above

Final champion
- (United States) Dicky Thompson
- Location in the United States Location in Louisiana

The Baton Rouge Open was a golf tournament on the Ben Hogan Tour. It was played only in 1990, at The Country Club of Louisiana in Baton Rouge, Louisiana.

Dicky Thompson won the tournament by two strokes, earning $20,000 from the $100,000 purse.

== Winners ==
Year	Winner	Score	To par	Margin of victory	Runners-up
1990	(United States) Dicky Thompson	209	−7	2 strokes	(United States) Carl Cooper (United States) Dick Mast (United States) Jim McGovern (United States) Greg Whisman
