= Gateway Open =

Golf tournament

Ben Hogan Gateway Open
Tournament information
- Location: Fort Myers, Florida
- Established: 1990
- Course: Gateway Country Club
- Par: 72
- Tour: Ben Hogan Tour
- Format: Stroke play
- Prize fund: US$100,000
- Month played: March
- Final year: 1991

Tournament record score
- Aggregate: 205 Gary McCord (1991)
- To par: −11 as above

Final champion
- (United States) Gary McCord
- Location in the United States Location in Florida

The Gateway Open was a golf tournament on the Ben Hogan Tour. It ran from 1990 to 1991. It was played at Gateway Country Club in Fort Myers, Florida.

In 1991 the winner earned $20,000.

== Winners ==
| Year | Winner | Score | To par | Margin of victory | Runners-up |
Ben Hogan Gateway Open
| 1991 | (United States) Gary McCord | 205 | −11 | 5 strokes | (United States) Tom Garner (United States) Paul Trittler (United States) Rocky Walcher |
| 1990 | (United States) Ted Tryba | 209 | −7 | Playoff | (United States) John Daly (United States) Bruce Fleisher |
