= Texarkana Open =

Nike Texarkana Open
Tournament information
- Location: Texarkana, Arkansas
- Established: 1990
- Course: Texarkana Country Club
- Par: 72
- Tour: Nike Tour
- Format: Stroke play
- Prize fund: US$200,000
- Month played: August
- Final year: 1995

Tournament record score
- Aggregate: 266 Mike Brisky (1994)
- To par: −22 as above

Final champion
- (United States) Allen Doyle
- Location in the United States Location in Arkansas

The Texarkana Open was a golf tournament on the Nike Tour. It ran from 1990 to 1995. It was played at Texarkana Country Club in Texarkana, Arkansas.

== Winners ==
Year	Winner	Score	To par	Margin of victory	Runner(s)-up	Ref.
Nike Texarkana Open
1995	(United States) Allen Doyle	269	−19	1 stroke	(United States) Gary Rusnak	
1994	(United States) Mike Brisky	266	−22	7 strokes	(United States) Sonny Skinner	
1993	(United States) Hugh Royer III	267	−21	2 strokes	(Australia) Steve Rintoul	
Ben Hogan Texarkana Open
1992	(United States) Perry Moss	197	−19	6 strokes	(Namibia) Trevor Dodds (United States) Marty Schiene	
1991	(Canada) Jerry Anderson	201	−15	Playoff	(United States) Fran Quinn	
1990	(United States) Jim McGovern	200	−16	2 strokes	(United States) John Daly	
