= Fort Wayne Open =

Ben Hogan Fort Wayne Open
Tournament information
- Location: Fort Wayne, Indiana
- Established: 1990
- Course: Brookwood Country Club
- Tour: Ben Hogan Tour
- Format: Stroke play
- Prize fund: US$125,000
- Month played: July
- Final year: 1992

Tournament record score
- Aggregate: 197 Dick Mast (1990)
- To par: −16 Dick Mast (1990) −16 Russell Beiersdorf (1992) −16 Chris T. Anderson (1992)

Final champion
- (United States) Russell Beiersdorf
- Location in the United States Location in Indiana

The Fort Wayne Open was a professional golf tournament on the Ben Hogan Tour that was played in Fort Wayne, Indiana from 1990 to 1992. It was played at Orchard Ridge Country Club in 1990 and 1991, and at Brookwood Country Club in 1992.

In 1990, Steve Brodie hit the first double eagle in any Ben Hogan Tour event, which was also the only double eagle on that Tour that year. In 1992, the winner earned $25,000.

== Winners ==
Year	Winner	Score	To par	Margin of victory	Runner(s)-up	Ref.
Ben Hogan Fort Wayne Open
1992	(United States) Russell Beiersdorf	200	−16	Playoff	(United States) Chris T. Anderson	
1991	(United States) Bob Friend	201	−12	Playoff	(Canada) Jerry Anderson (United States) Dennis Trixler	
1990	(United States) Dick Mast	197	−16	3 strokes	(United States) Jim McGovern	

== See also ==
- History of sports in Fort Wayne, Indiana
