= Fran Quinn =

American professional golfer (born 1965)

Personal information
- Full name: Francis Quinn Jr.
- Nationality: United States
- Born: March 11, 1965 (age 61) Worcester, Massachusetts, U.S.
- Height: 6 ft 0 in (1.83 m)
- Weight: 175 lb (79 kg; 12.5 st)
- Spouse: Lori
- Children: Owen, Katie, Sean

Career
- Sport: Golf
- College: Northwestern University
- Turned professional: 1988
- Current tour: PGA Tour Champions
- Former tours: PGA Tour; Nationwide Tour
- Professional wins: 8

Number of wins by tour
- Asian Tour: 2
- Korn Ferry Tour: 4
- Other: 2

Best results in major championships
- Masters Tournament: DNP
- PGA Championship: DNP
- U.S. Open: 43rd: 1994
- The Open Championship: CUT: 1994

Francis Quinn Jr. (born March 11, 1965) is an American professional golfer who currently plays on the PGA Tour Champions. He previously played on the PGA Tour and the Nationwide Tour.

== Early life and amateur career ==
Quinn was born in Worcester, Massachusetts and graduated from Saint John's High School in 1983. He earned a Bachelor of Arts degree in economics from Northwestern University in 1987.

== Professional career ==
In 1988, Quinn turned pro. He played his first full season on the Ben Hogan Tour in 1991, where he made 13 of 25 cuts. Later in the year he finished T8 at 1991 PGA Tour Qualifying School obtaining his PGA Tour card for 1992. He made six of 18 cuts in 1992 and lost his tour card for 1993.

Quinn split his time between the PGA Tour and its developmental tour, now called the Korn Ferry Tour, from 1993 to 1997 until he shifted his focus mainly to the developmental tour. In 1999, Quinn picked up his first win on the Nike Tour at the Nike Dakota Dunes Open in a playoff. He had three top-10s on the season.

Quinn won his first start of 2000 at the Buy.com Florida Classic, but it was his only top 10 of the season. He finished with $125,000 in season-long earnings. After his 2000 win, Quinn saw his game come to a standstill. From 2002 to mid-2009, he played in over 300 events, without another win, finishing in the top-10 17 times.

Quinn saw his career be resurrected in late 2009 at the Albertsons Boise Open in September. He went head-to-head in the final round with Blake Adams, who had led after all three rounds. Quinn found himself tied for the lead at the 18th hole. He hit his approach within 10 feet and knocked in his birdie putt after Adams failed to make his. It was Quinn's third career Nationwide Tour win, and it put him to over $1,000,000 in Nationwide Tour career earnings. It also vaulted him from 92nd to 18th on the 2009 money list. He finished the year 25th on the money list to earn his 2010 PGA Tour card.

Stress fractures limited Quinn to seven PGA Tour events in 2010, where he made two cuts. Quinn also played in three Nationwide Tour events in 2010, where he won his fourth career Nationwide Tour event, the Panama Claro Championship. He played the 2011 and 2012 seasons on a Major Medical Exemption, which he was unable to satisfy.

At the 2014 U.S. Open, Quinn had to go through local and sectional qualifying just to make the field. He ended the first round tied for second. It was his first U.S. Open since 1996. In 2022, Quinn became the oldest player to earn entry to the U.S. Open via qualifying, at age 57.

== Amateur wins ==
- 1986 Massachusetts Amateur

== Professional wins (8) ==
=== Asian PGA Tour wins (2) ===
No.	Date	Tournament	Winning score	Margin of victory	Runner(s)-up
1	Dec 4, 1999	Mittweida Thailand Open	−13 (71-66-67-71=275)	1 stroke	(United States) Christian Peña, (Canada) Jim Rutledge, (Scotland) Simon Yates
2	Dec 12, 1999	Omega PGA Championship	−18 (69-67-69-65=270)	3 strokes	(Scotland) Simon Yates

=== Nationwide Tour wins (4) ===
No.	Date	Tournament	Winning score	Margin of victory	Runner(s)-up
1	Aug 1, 1999	Nike Dakota Dunes Open	−18 (65-69-68-68=270)	Playoff	(United States) Ryan Howison, (United States) Craig Kanada
2	Feb 6, 2000	Buy.com Florida Classic	−13 (69-67-69-66=271)	3 strokes	(Australia) Mark Hensby
3	Sep 20, 2009	Albertsons Boise Open	−14 (68-65-68-69=270)	1 stroke	(United States) Blake Adams
4	Feb 29, 2010	Panama Claro Championship	−15 (66-66-62-71=265)	2 strokes	(United States) Brian Smock

Nationwide Tour playoff record (1–1)

No.	Year	Tournament	Opponent(s)	Result
1	1991	Ben Hogan Texarkana Open	(Canada) Jerry Anderson	Lost to par on first extra hole
2	1999	Nike Dakota Dunes Open	(United States) Ryan Howison, (United States) Craig Kanada	Won with birdie on first extra hole

=== Other wins (2) ===
- 1990 Massachusetts Open
- 1997 New Hampshire Open

== Results in major championships ==
Tournament	1992	1993	1994	1995	1996	1997	1998	1999
U.S. Open	CUT		43		CUT			
The Open Championship			CUT					

Tournament	2000	2001	2002	2003	2004	2005	2006	2007	2008	2009
U.S. Open										
The Open Championship										

Tournament	2010	2011	2012	2013	2014	2015	2016	2017	2018	2019
U.S. Open					T56					
The Open Championship										

Tournament	2020	2021	2022
U.S. Open			CUT
The Open Championship		NT	

Did not play

CUT = missed the half-way cut
"T" = Tied
NT = No tournament due to the COVID-19 pandemic
Note: Quinn never played in the Masters Tournament or the PGA Championship.

== See also ==
- 1991 PGA Tour Qualifying School graduates
- 2009 Nationwide Tour graduates
- List of golfers with most Web.com Tour wins
