= Pensacola Classic =

Golf tournament

Nike Pensacola Classic
Tournament information
- Location: Milton, Florida
- Established: 1990
- Course: The Moors Golf Course
- Par: 72
- Tour: Nike Tour
- Format: Stroke play
- Prize fund: $200,000
- Month played: March/April
- Final year: 1995

Tournament record score
- Aggregate: 271 Bruce Vaughan (1994)
- To par: −16 Rick Dalpos (1992)

Final champion
- (United States) Clarence Rose
- Location in the United States Location in Florida

The Pensacola Classic was a golf tournament on the Nike Tour which was played from 1990 to 1995, except in 1993. In 1995, the winner earned $36,000.

== Tournament hosts ==
- 1990 Pensacola Country Club, Pensacola, Florida
- 1991–92 Marcus Pointe Golf Course, Pensacola, Florida
- 1994–95 The Moors Golf Course, Milton, Florida

== Winners ==
Year	Winner	Score	To par	Margin of victory	Runner(s)-up	Ref
Ben Hogan Pensacola Classic
1990	(United States) Dick Mast	205	−11	1 stroke	(United States) Ken Mattiace (United States) Dennis Trixler	
1991	(Trinidad and Tobago) Stephen Ames	204	−12	1 stroke	(United States) Jerry Foltz	
1992	(United States) Rick Dalpos	272	−16	4 strokes	(United States) Roger Gunn	
1993: No tournament
Nike Pensacola Classic
1994	(United States) Bruce Vaughan	271	−13	1 stroke	(United States) Ron Philo	
1995	(United States) Clarence Rose	201 (Note: Shortened to 54 holes due to rain.)	−12	3 strokes	(United States) Bill Buttner (United States) Joe Cioe (United States) Hicks Malonson	
