= Gary McCord =

American professional golfer (born 1948)

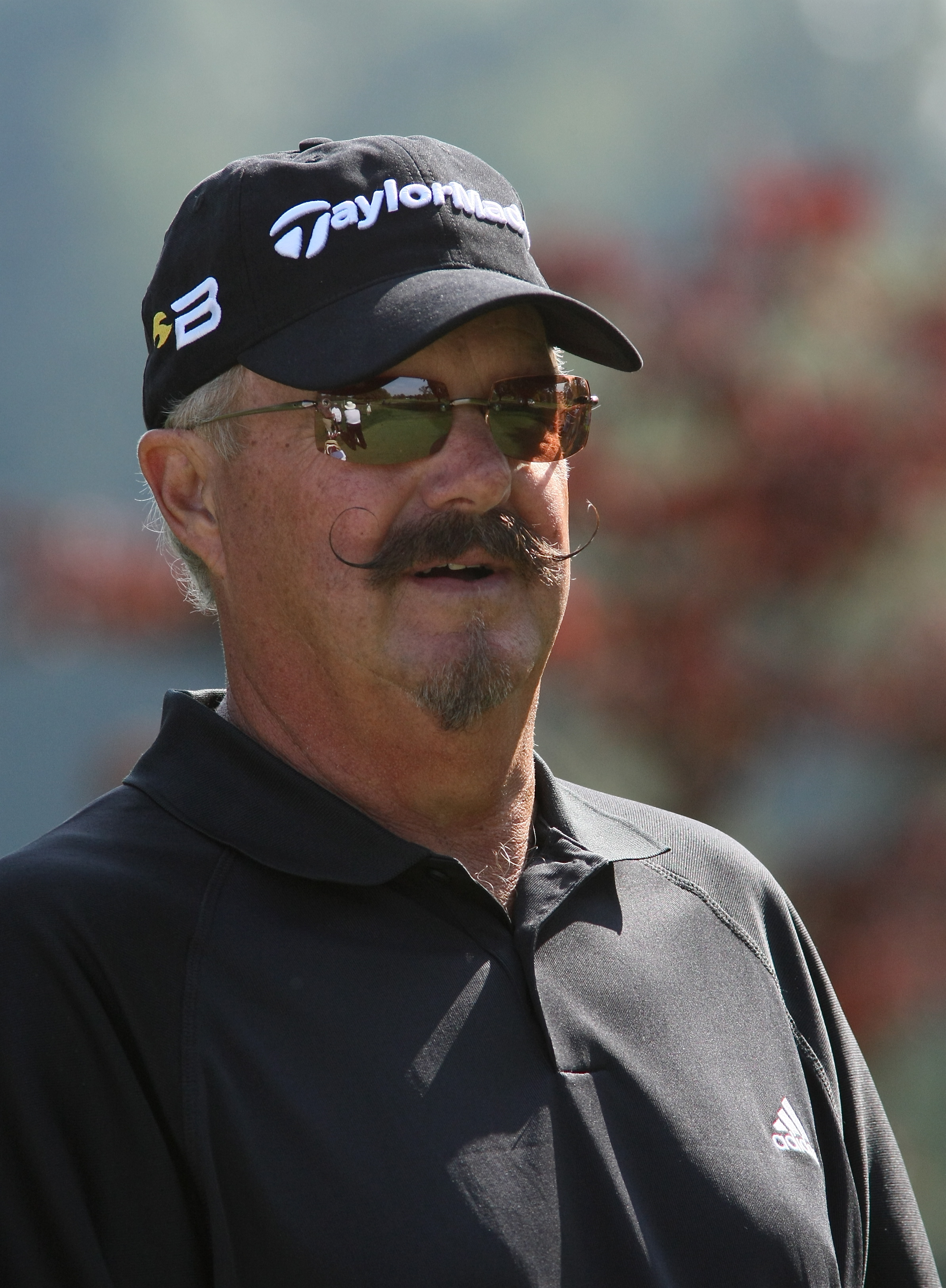
- McCord in 2008

Personal information
- Full name: Gary Dennis McCord
- Nationality: United States
- Born: May 23, 1948 (age 78) San Gabriel, California, U.S.
- Height: 6 ft 2 in (1.88 m)
- Weight: 190 lb (86 kg; 14 st)
- Spouse: Diane
- Children: Krista

Career
- Sport: Golf
- College: UC Riverside
- Turned professional: 1971
- Former tours: PGA Tour; Champions Tour
- Professional wins: 3

Number of wins by tour
- Korn Ferry Tour: 1
- PGA Tour Champions: 2

Best results in major championships
- Masters Tournament: DNP
- PGA Championship: T54: 1984
- U.S. Open: DNP
- The Open Championship: DNP

Gary Dennis McCord (born May 23, 1948) is an American professional golfer, commentator and author.

== Early life and amateur career ==
McCord was born in San Gabriel, California, and raised in southern California, graduating from Ramona High School in Riverside. He was a two-time Division II All-American for the UC Riverside Highlanders of the University of California, Riverside. He won the NCAA Division II individual championship in 1970

== Professional career ==
In 1971, McCord turned professional. He played in over 400 PGA Tour events but never won. His best two finishes on the PGA Tour were at the Greater Milwaukee Open, placing second in both 1975 and 1977. During his years on tour, he had two dozen top-10 finishes.

One year in his career won the PGA Tour category of "Fewest Putts." He helped reach this benchmark by, late in the season, deliberately missing the green and then chipping close to ensure few putts.

McCord was involved in an embarrassing episode during the 1984 FedEx St. Jude Classic in Memphis. When lining up a putt on the 15th green, McCord's pants split open, exposing his backside as he was not wearing any underwear. McCord wrapped a towel around his midriff and went off to find a replacement pair of pants. Eventually Peter Jacobsen offered McCord his rain pants for a "fee" of $20.

McCord also played a limited schedule on the Champions Tour. After turning 50 in May 1998, he won his first title at the Toshiba Senior Classic in March 1999, and also won that year's Ingersoll-Rand Senior Tour Championship. Back in 1991, he won the Gateway Open on the Ben Hogan Tour, the second-tier golf tour in the U.S., now called the Korn Ferry Tour.

=== Broadcasting career ===
At age 37 in 1986, McCord joined CBS Sports as a golf analyst. He was noted for his outspokenness and irreverence, traits that got him banished from the CBS commentary team for the Masters Tournament.

During the network's Masters coverage in 1994, McCord remarked that the 17th green was so fast it seemed to be "bikini-waxed", and that "body bags" were located behind the green for players who missed their approach shots. Several months later, Augusta National Golf Club used its influence with CBS to have him removed from the Masters commentary team. While McCord continued to cover every other golf event aired by CBS, he did not return to Augusta with the network. He was not the first CBS commentator to be banned: Jack Whitaker referred to the gallery at the end of the 18-hole playoff in 1966 as a "mob" rather than "patrons" and was banned for the next five Masters; he was allowed to return in 1972.

After 33 years with CBS, McCord was not brought back for the network’s 2020 golf broadcast team.

McCord has also written two books, Just a Range Ball in a Box of Titleists and Golf for Dummies. In 1996, he appeared as himself in the Kevin Costner movie Tin Cup, a movie he says is based on his life. He and fellow former CBS commentator Peter Kostis are partners in the Kostis/McCord Learning Center in Scottsdale, Arizona. McCord formerly served as a co-announcer on the EA Sports' Tiger Woods PGA Tour series along with David Feherty.

== Personal life ==
McCord lives with his wife, Diane, in Paradise Valley, Arizona, and Edwards, Colorado.

== Amateur wins ==
- 1970 NCAA Division II Championship

== Professional wins (3) ==
=== Ben Hogan Tour wins (1) ===
No.	Date	Tournament	Winning score	To par	Margin of victory	Runners-up
1	Mar 30, 1991	Ben Hogan Gateway Open	67-69-69=205	−11	5 strokes	(United States) Tom Garner, (United States) Paul Trittler, (United States) Rocky Walcher

=== Senior PGA Tour wins (2) ===
Legend
Tour Championships (1)
Other Senior PGA Tour (1)

No.	Date	Tournament	Winning score	To par	Margin of victory	Runners-up
1	Mar 14, 1999	Toshiba Senior Classic	65-68-69=204	−9	Playoff	(United States) Allen Doyle, (United States) Al Geiberger, (United States) John Jacobs
2	Nov 7, 1999	Ingersoll-Rand Senior Tour Championship	71-74-64-67=276	−12	1 stroke	(United States) Bruce Fleisher, (United States) Larry Nelson

Senior PGA Tour playoff record (1–2)

No.	Year	Tournament	Opponent(s)	Result
1	1999	Toshiba Senior Classic	(United States) Allen Doyle, (United States) Al Geiberger, (United States) John Jacobs	Won with birdie on fifth extra hole Doyle and Geiberger eliminated by eagle on first hole
2	2000	LiquidGolf.com Invitational	(United States) J. C. Snead, (United States) Tom Wargo	Wargo won with birdie on third extra hole Snead eliminated by par on first hole
3	2002	Turtle Bay Championship	(United States) Hale Irwin	Lost to birdie on first extra hole

== Results in major championships ==
Tournament	1980	1981	1982	1983	1984
PGA Championship	CUT			CUT	T54

Note: McCord only played in the PGA Championship.

Did not play

CUT = missed the half-way cut
"T" = tied

== U.S. national team appearances ==
Professional

- Wendy's 3-Tour Challenge (representing Senior PGA Tour): 2002

== See also ==
- 1973 PGA Tour Qualifying School graduates
- 1982 PGA Tour Qualifying School graduates
