= Mike Brisky =

American professional golfer (born 1965)

Personal information
- Full name: Michael Charles Brisky
- Nationality: United States
- Born: May 28, 1965 (age 61) Southlake, Texas, U.S.
- Height: 6 ft 0 in (1.83 m)
- Weight: 190 lb (86 kg; 14 st)

Career
- Sport: Golf
- College: Pan American University
- Turned professional: 1987
- Former tours: PGA Tour; Nike Tour; T. C. Jordan Tour
- Professional wins: 3

Number of wins by tour
- Korn Ferry Tour: 1
- Other: 2

Best results in major championships
- Masters Tournament: DNP
- PGA Championship: T14: 1996
- U.S. Open: T23: 2000
- The Open Championship: DNP

Michael Charles Brisky (born May 28, 1965) is an American professional golfer who played on the PGA Tour and the Nationwide Tour.

== Amateur career ==
Brisky attended Pan American University where he was a standout member of the men's golf team from 1982 through 1986. He was inducted into the university's Athletic Hall of Fame in 2012.

== Professional career ==
In 1987, Brisky turned pro. He joined the PGA Tour in 1994, earning his tour card through qualifying school. He didn't play well enough to retain his card but earned his card for the following year through qualifying school. He also played on the Nike Tour that year and won the Nike Texarkana Open.

Brisky performed a lot better on the PGA Tour in 1995 and finished 92nd on the money list. The highlight of his year came at the Buick Open where he lost in a playoff to Woody Austin. He continued to play well in 1996 and finished 84th on the money list while recording three top-10 finishes. He also finished in a tie for 14th at the 1996 PGA Championship. He played even better in 1997, finishing 67th on the money list while recording six top-10 finishes including a third-place finish at the Deposit Guaranty Golf Classic. He didn't play as well in 1998, recording only one top-10 finish. He had to go through qualifying school to earn his card for the following year. In 1999 he finished 115th on the money list with the highlight of his year coming at the John Deere Classic where he lost to J. L. Lewis in a playoff. 2000 was his last year on the PGA Tour and he didn't find much success. He played on the Nationwide Tour from 2001 to 2003.

Brisky played on the NGA Hooters Tour from 1989 to 1993 where he won two tournaments

== Professional wins (3) ==
=== Nike Tour wins (1) ===
No.	Date	Tournament	Winning score	Margin of victory	Runner-up
1	Aug 21, 1994	Nike Texarkana Open	−22 (66-65-68-67=266)	7 strokes	(United States) Sonny Skinner

=== T. C. Jordan Tour wins (2) ===
No.	Date	Tournament	Winning score	Margin of victory	Runner-up
1	May 3, 1992	Belding Pro Gear Classic	−10 (67-68-72-71=278)	4 strokes	(United States) Greg Parker
2	Jun 28, 1992	Bud Light Classic	−15 (69-66-70-64=269)	1 stroke	(United States) Greg Parker

== Playoff record ==
PGA Tour playoff record (0–2)

No.	Year	Tournament	Opponent	Result
1	1995	Buick Open	(United States) Woody Austin	Lost to par on second extra hole
2	1999	John Deere Classic	(United States) J. L. Lewis	Lost to birdie on fifth extra hole

== Results in major championships ==
Tournament	1989	1990	1991	1992	1993	1994	1995	1996	1997	1998	1999	2000
U.S. Open	CUT						T67		CUT	CUT		T23
PGA Championship								T14	CUT			

Did not play

CUT = missed the half-way cut
"T" = tied
Note: Brisky never played in the Masters Tournament or The Open Championship.

== See also ==
- 1993 PGA Tour Qualifying School graduates
- 1994 PGA Tour Qualifying School graduates
- 1998 PGA Tour Qualifying School graduates
