= Bakersfield Open =

Golf tournament

Nike Bakersfield Open
Tournament information
- Location: Bakersfield, California, U.S.
- Established: 1990
- Course: Bakersfield Country Club
- Par: 72
- Tour: Nike Tour
- Format: Stroke play
- Prize fund: $150,000
- Final year: 1993

Tournament record score
- Aggregate: 202 Clark Dennis (1993); 202 Jim Furyk (1993); 202 Sonny Skinner (1993)
- To par: −14 as above

Final champion
- (United States) Clark Dennis
- Location in the United States Location in California

The Bakersfield Open was a golf tournament on the Nike Tour. It ran from 1990 to 1993, and was played in Bakersfield, California. In 1990 and 1991, it was played at Bakersfield Country Club. In 1992 and 1993, it was played at Seven Oaks Country Club. The 1990 event was the first played on the tour, then called the Ben Hogan Tour.

== Winners ==
Year	Winner	Score	To par	Margin of victory	Runner(s)-up	Ref
Ben Hogan Bakersfield Open
1990	(United States) Mike Springer	209	−7	2 strokes	(United States) David Tentis	
1991	(United States) Olin Browne	207	−9	4 strokes	(United States) Bob Friend (United States) Ron Streck	
1992	(United States) Tom Garner	205	−11	2 strokes	(United States) Steve Lowery	
Nike Bakersfield Open
1993	(United States) Clark Dennis	202	−14	Playoff	(United States) Jim Furyk (United States) Sonny Skinner	
