= Russell Beiersdorf =

American professional golfer (born 1965)

Personal information
- Nationality: United States
- Born: December 24, 1965 (age 60) Dallas, Texas, U.S.
- Height: 6 ft 5 in (1.96 m)
- Weight: 200 lb (91 kg; 14 st)

Career
- Sport: Golf
- College: Southern Methodist University
- Turned professional: 1986
- Former tours: Nationwide Tour; PGA Tour
- Professional wins: 3

Number of wins by tour
- Korn Ferry Tour: 3

Russell Beiersdorf (born December 24, 1965) is an American professional golfer who played on the Nationwide Tour and the PGA Tour.

== Early life ==
Beiersdorf was born in Dallas, Texas. He played collegiately at Southern Methodist University

== Professional career ==
In 1986, Beiersdorf turned professional. He played on the Ben Hogan Tour in the early 1990s and had success, winning three tournaments. This helped earn him a promotion to the PGA Tour in 1993 and 1994. He scored a hole in one on the third hole at the South Course at Torrey Pines at 1994 Buick Invitational. However, he quickly returned to the developmental tour for the remainder of the decade.

== Professional wins (3) ==
=== Ben Hogan Tour wins (3) ===
No.	Date	Tournament	Winning score	Margin of victory	Runner-up
1	Sep 15, 1991	Ben Hogan Boise Open	−11 (67-66-69=202)	Playoff	(United States) Rich Parker
2	May 10, 1992	Ben Hogan Greater Greenville Classic	−11 (64-69=133) (Note: Shortened to 36 holes due to weather.)	2 strokes	(United States) Kim Kimball
3	Jul 12, 1992	Ben Hogan Fort Wayne Open	−16 (64-66-70=200)	Playoff	(United States) Chris T. Anderson

Ben Hogan Tour playoff record (2–0)

No.	Year	Tournament	Opponent	Result
1	1991	Ben Hogan Boise Open	(United States) Rich Parker	Won with par on third extra hole
2	1992	Ben Hogan Fort Wayne Open	(United States) Chris T. Anderson	Won with birdie on first extra hole

== See also ==
- 1992 Ben Hogan Tour graduates
