= Quicksilver Open =

Ben Hogan Quicksilver Open
Tournament information
- Location: Midway, Washington County, Pennsylvania
- Established: 1990
- Course: Quicksilver Golf Club
- Par: 72
- Tour: Ben Hogan Tour
- Format: Stroke play
- Prize fund: US$250,000
- Month played: June
- Final year: 1992

Tournament record score
- Aggregate: 277 John Flannery (1992)
- To par: −11 as above

Final champion
- (United States) John Flannery
- Location in the United States Location in Pennsylvania

The Ben Hogan Quicksilver Open was a golf tournament on the Ben Hogan Tour. It ran from 1990 to 1992, during which time it was the richest event on the tour. It was played at Quicksilver Golf Club in the Pittsburgh suburb of Midway, Pennsylvania.

In 1992 the winner earned $50,000.

== Winners ==
Year	Winner	Score	To par	Margin of victory	Runner(s)-up
Ben Hogan Quicksilver Open
1992	(United States) John Flannery	277	−11	3 strokes	(United States) Steve Lowery
1991	(United States) Lon Hinkle	210	−6	2 strokes	(United States) Andy Morse (United States) Rick Pearson (United States) Joey Rassett
1990	(United States) R. W. Eaks	212	−4	2 strokes	(United States) Brandel Chamblee (United States) Ed Humenik (United States) Dick Mast
