= Elizabethtown Open =

Golf tournament

Ben Hogan Elizabethtown Open
Tournament information
- Location: Elizabethtown, Kentucky
- Established: 1990
- Course: Pine Valley Country Club
- Par: 71
- Tour: Ben Hogan Tour
- Format: Stroke play
- Prize fund: US$100,000
- Month played: May
- Final year: 1991

Tournament record score
- Aggregate: 201 Ricky Smallridge (1991)
- To par: −12 as above

Final champion
- (United States) Ricky Smallridge
- Location in the United States Location in Kentucky

The Elizabethtown Open was a golf tournament on the Ben Hogan Tour. It ran from 1990 to 1991. It was played at Pine Valley Country Club in Elizabethtown, Kentucky.

In 1991 the winner earned $20,000.

== Winners ==
Year	Winner	Score	To par	Margin of victory	Runner-up	Ref
Ben Hogan Elizabethtown Open
1990	(United States) Dicky Thompson	205	−11	Playoff	(United States) Jeff Maggert	
1991	(United States) Ricky Smallridge	201	−12	5 strokes	(United States) Jerry Foltz	
