= Dutch Senior Masters =

Professional golf tournament

Tournament information
- Location: Spijk, Netherlands
- Established: 2017
- Course: The Dutch
- Par: 71
- Length: 6,983 yards (6,385 m)
- Tour: European Senior Tour
- Format: Stroke play
- Prize fund: €180,000
- Month played: October
- Final year: 2017

Tournament record score
- Aggregate: 211 Clark Dennis (2017)
- To par: −2 as above

Final champion
- (United States) Clark Dennis

Location map
- Location in the Netherlands

The Dutch Senior Masters was a men's professional golf tournament for players aged 50 and above which is part of the European Senior Tour. It was first held in October 2017 at The Dutch, Spijk, Netherlands. It was the first European Senior Tour event to be held in the Netherlands since the 2014 Dutch Senior Open.

== Winners ==
Year	Winner	Score	To par	Margin of victory	Runners-up
2017	(United States) Clark Dennis	211	−2	1 stroke	(England) Paul Eales (England) Carl Mason (Scotland) Andrew Oldcorn
