= Clark Dennis =

American professional golfer (born 1966)

Personal information
- Full name: Clark Sherwood Dennis
- Nationality: United States
- Born: February 14, 1966 (age 60) Houston, Texas, U.S.
- Height: 5 ft 11 in (1.80 m)
- Weight: 180 lb (82 kg; 13 st)

Career
- Sport: Golf
- College: University of Arkansas; Southern Methodist University
- Turned professional: 1986
- Current tours: European Senior Tour; PGA Tour Champions
- Former tours: PGA Tour; Nike Tour
- Professional wins: 9

Number of wins by tour
- Korn Ferry Tour: 1
- European Senior Tour: 6
- Other: 2

Best results in major championships
- Masters Tournament: CUT: 1995
- PGA Championship: CUT: 1998
- U.S. Open: T6: 1994
- The Open Championship: DNP

Achievements and awards
- European Senior Tour Order of Merit winner: 2017
- European Senior Tour Rookie of the Year: 2017

Clark Sherwood Dennis (born February 14, 1966) is an American professional golfer. He played on the PGA Tour and Nationwide Tour from 1990 to 2000. He had one win on the Nationwide Tour and a best finish of tied for third place on the PGA Tour. He was tied for sixth in the 1994 U.S. Open. As a senior, Dennis has won several times on the European Senior Tour.

== Amateur career ==
Dennis played college golf at the University of Arkansas and Southern Methodist University.

== Professional career ==
In 1986, Dennis turned professional. He played on both the PGA Tour (1990–91, 1994–95, 1998–99) and Nationwide Tour (1993, 1996–97, 2000). His best finishes on the PGA Tour were a pair of T-3, at the 1990 Hawaiian Open and at the 1998 Kemper Open. His best finish on the Nationwide Tour was a win at the 1993 Nike Bakersfield Open. His best finish in a major was at the 1994 U.S. Open.

=== Senior career ===
Dennis finished in a tie for second place in the 2017 European Senior Tour qualifying school to gain his place on the tour. Dennis played in the 2017 U.S. Senior Open and the 2017 Senior Open Championship. In September 2017 he had his first success on the European Senior Tour, winning the Senior Italian Open. The final round was abandoned because of a waterlogged course. Dennis and Peter Fowler were tied after two rounds and a playoff was arranged on the 18th hole, played as a par three from the fairway. Dennis won at the first playoff hole with a birdie. The following month he won the Dutch Senior Masters, his second win on the tour. He had six other top-5 finishes during the season and won the John Jacobs Trophy as the leader of the Order of Merit.

In June 2018 he retained the Senior Italian Open. Rafael Gómez led by two strokes with one hole to play but bogeyed the final hole while Dennis made a birdie. Dennis then won at the first playoff hole after Gómez made another bogey. He had his second win of the season in December at the MCB Tour Championship – Mauritius where he was 23-under-par for the three rounds, winning by eight strokes.

== Awards and honors ==
- In 2017, Dennis earned Rookie of the Year honors for the European Senior Tour
- In 2017, Dennis was the Order of Merit winner for the European Senior Tour

== Professional wins (9) ==
=== Nike Tour wins (1) ===
No.	Date	Tournament	Winning score	Margin of victory	Runners-up
1	Oct 10, 1993	Nike Bakersfield Open	−14 (64-69-69=202)	Playoff	(United States) Jim Furyk, (United States) Sonny Skinner

Nike Tour playoff record (1–0)

No.	Year	Tournament	Opponents	Result
1	1993	Nike Bakersfield Open	(United States) Jim Furyk, (United States) Sonny Skinner	Won with birdie on first extra hole

=== Other wins (2) ===
- 1988 Nevada State Open
- 1992 Texas State Open

=== European Senior Tour wins (6) ===
Legend
Tour Championships (1)
Other European Senior Tour (5)

No.	Date	Tournament	Winning score	Margin of victory	Runner(s)-up
1	Sep 10, 2017	Senior Italian Open	−7 (67-70=137) (Note: Shortened to 36 holes due to weather.)	Playoff	(Australia) Peter Fowler
2	Oct 8, 2017	Dutch Senior Masters	−2 (69-72-70=211)	1 stroke	(England) Paul Eales, (England) Carl Mason, (Scotland) Andrew Oldcorn
3	Jun 17, 2018	Senior Italian Open (2)	−13 (67-67-69=203)	Playoff	(Argentina) Rafael Gómez
4	Dec 9, 2018	MCB Tour Championship (Mauritius)	−23 (63-66-64=193)	8 strokes	(Sweden) Magnus Persson Atlevi
5	Jul 21, 2019	WINSTONgolf Senior Open	−15 (70-68-63=201)	1 stroke	(Spain) José María Olazábal
6	Jun 9, 2024	Costa Navarino Legends Tour Trophy	−17 (66-66-66=198)	4 strokes	(Australia) Scott Hend

European Senior Tour playoff record (2–1)

No.	Year	Tournament	Opponent(s)	Result
1	2017	Senior Italian Open	(Australia) Peter Fowler	Won with birdie on first extra hole
2	2018	Sharjah Senior Golf Masters	(Australia) Peter Fowler, (Thailand) Thaworn Wiratchant	Wiratchant won with par on fourth extra hole Fowler eliminated by par on first hole
3	2018	Senior Italian Open	(Argentina) Rafael Gómez	Won with par on first extra hole

== Results in major championships ==
Tournament	1988	1989	1990	1991	1992	1993	1994	1995	1996	1997	1998	1999	2000	2001
Masters Tournament								CUT						
U.S. Open	CUT	T43					T6	CUT						CUT
PGA Championship											CUT			

Note: Dennis never played The Open Championship.

Top 10
Did not play

CUT = missed the half way cut
"T" indicates a tie for a place.

== Results in senior major championships ==
Results not in chronological order

Tournament	2017	2018	2019	2020	2021	2022	2023	2024	2025	2026
Senior PGA Championship		73		NT	CUT	CUT	T59	CUT	CUT	
The Tradition				NT						
U.S. Senior Open	CUT	CUT	T38	NT	CUT	T55	T38		CUT	
Senior Players Championship		T14								
The Senior Open Championship	T31	T32	T46	NT	T16	T27	T33	T25	T22	T32

Did not play

CUT = missed the halfway cut
"T" indicates a tie for a place
NT = no tournament due to COVID-19 pandemic

== See also ==
- 1989 PGA Tour Qualifying School graduates
- 1990 PGA Tour Qualifying School graduates
- 1993 PGA Tour Qualifying School graduates
- 1997 PGA Tour Qualifying School graduates
- List of golfers with most European Senior Tour wins
