= 1994 PGA Tour Qualifying School graduates =

This is a list of the 46 players who earned 1995 PGA Tour cards through the PGA Tour Qualifying Tournament in 1994.

Place	Player	PGA Tour starts	Cuts made	Notes
1	(United States) Woody Austin	1	0	
2	(Argentina) Eduardo Romero	39	15	6 European Tour wins
T3	(United States) Tray Tyner	33	10	
T3	(United States) Bruce Fleisher	381	232	1 PGA Tour win
5	(United States) Harry Taylor	159	80	
T6	(United States) Patrick Burke	78	35	
T6	(United States) Dudley Hart	121	64	
T8	(United States) Bill Porter	1	1	1 Nike Tour win
T8	(United States) Ronnie Black	358	222	2 PGA Tour wins
T10	(United States) Mike Brisky	15	6	1 Nike Tour win
T10	(United States) Don Reese	88	25	1 Nike Tour win
T10	(United States) Doug Martin	73	26	1 Nike Tour win
T10	(United States) Charlie Rymer	3	1	1 Nike Tour win
T10	(United States) Omar Uresti	1	0	1 Nike Tour win
T15	(United States) Marco Dawson	122	62	
T15	(United States) Lee Rinker	23	10	
T15	(United States) Joey Rassett	112	51	
T15	(United States) Jeff Leonard	0	0	
T15	(United States) Mark Wurtz	29	14	
T15	(United States) Bart Bryant	55	28	
T15	(United States) J. L. Lewis	30	8	
T22	(United States) Steve Gotsche	27	10	
T22	(United States) Tommy Tolles	3	0	2 Nike Tour wins
T22	(United States) Joe Acosta Jr.	0	0	
T22	(United States) Dicky Thompson	59	22	2 Nike Tour wins
T22	(United States) Kelly Gibson	104	50	1 Nike Tour win
T22	(United States) Phil Blackmar	286	144	2 PGA Tour wins
T22	(United States) J. P. Hayes	28	11	
T29	(United States) Scott McCarron	0	0	
T29	(United States) Jonathan Kaye	0	0	
T29	(Canada) Ray Stewart	177	92	
T29	(United States) Keith Fergus	290	215	3 PGA Tour wins
T29	(United States) Tim Loustalot	2	1	1 Nike Tour win
T29	(United States) Kawika Cotner	1	0	
T29	(United States) Scott Ford	1	0	
T29	(United States) Tony Sills	286	155	1 PGA Tour win
T37	(United States) Ryan Howison	0	0	
T37	(United States) Clark Burroughs	115	58	
T37	(United States) Jay Williamson	0	0	
T37	(United States) John Adams	451	229	
T37	(United States) Steve Hart	144	52	
T37	(United States) Michael Allen	135	67	1 European Tour win
T37	(United States) Mike Smith	298	147	
T37	(United States) Carl Paulson	0	0	
T37	(United States) Tom Hearn	1	0	
T37	(United States) Bill Britton	379	211	1 PGA Tour win

PGA Tour rookie in 1995

== 1995 Results ==
Player	Starts	Cuts made	Best finish	Money list rank	Earnings ($)
(United States) Woody Austin*	34	22	Win	24	736,497
(Argentina) Eduardo Romero	15	4	T24	233	24,942
(United States) Tray Tyner	31	12	T4	142	126,339
(United States) Bruce Fleisher	22	13	T8	154	108,830
(United States) Harry Taylor	29	14	T7	163	94,265
(United States) Patrick Burke	24	16	T7	119	162,892
(United States) Dudley Hart	30	18	T15	148	116,334
(United States) Bill Porter*	25	12	T11	178	68,390
(United States) Ronnie Black	29	17	T9	143	122,188
(United States) Mike Brisky	30	14	2	92	194,874
(United States) Don Reese	26	10	T20	217	38,905
(United States) Doug Martin	29	18	2	81	227,463
(United States) Charlie Rymer*	28	11	3	103	180,401
(United States) Omar Uresti*	31	16	T12	156	104,876
(United States) Marco Dawson	25	14	2	71	261,214
(United States) Lee Rinker	29	18	T6	96	187,065
(United States) Joey Rassett	22	5	T11	220	34,132
(United States) Jeff Leonard*	26	9	T7	200	53,444
(United States) Mark Wurtz	28	13	T21	189	59,949
(United States) Bart Bryant	27	13	T11	146	119,201
(United States) J. L. Lewis	28	13	T17	190	59,750
(United States) Steve Gotsche	28	13	T19	177	70,425
(United States) Tommy Tolles*	27	13	T3	116	166,431
(United States) Joe Acosta Jr.*	26	11	T3	127	147,745
(United States) Dicky Thompson	25	9	T4	201	53,380
(United States) Kelly Gibson	33	19	T7	109	173,425
(United States) Phil Blackmar	24	15	T4	121	154,801
(United States) J. P. Hayes	27	13	T12	153	111,696
(United States) Scott McCarron*	25	12	3	128	147,371
(United States) Jonathan Kaye*	25	8	2	94	191,883
(Canada) Ray Stewart	21	11	T27	204	48,965
(United States) Keith Fergus	26	17	T8	130	146,359
(United States) Tim Loustalot*	22	5	T32	243	17,077
(United States) Kawika Cotner*	26	14	T14	195	56,625
(United States) Scott Ford*	19	3	T52	275	7,608
(United States) Tony Sills	24	12	7	151	113,186
(United States) Ryan Howison*	19	4	T38	255	11,078
(United States) Clark Burroughs	15	3	T65	301	5,218
(United States) Jay Williamson*	22	11	T4	145	120,180
(United States) John Adams	25	16	4	74	243,366
(United States) Steve Hart	17	1	T54	326	2,748
(United States) Michael Allen	21	7	T5	197	55,825
(United States) Mike Smith	25	10	T20	205	48,088
(United States) Carl Paulson*	21	10	T7	183	64,501
(United States) Tom Hearn*	21	8	T21	216	39,163
(United States) Bill Britton	24	10	6	175	73,574

*PGA Tour rookie in 1995
T = Tied
The player retained his PGA Tour card for 1996 (finished inside the top 125, excluding non-members)
The player did not retain his PGA Tour card for 1996, but retained conditional status (finished between 126-150, excluding non-members)
The player did not retain his PGA Tour card for 1996 (finished outside the top 150)

== Winners on the PGA Tour in 1995 ==
No.	Date	Player	Tournament	Winning score	Margin of victory	Runner-up
1	Aug 6	(United States) Woody Austin	Buick Open	−18 (63-68-72-67=270)	Playoff	(United States) Mike Brisky

== Runners-up on the PGA Tour in 1995 ==
No.	Date	Player	Tournament	Winner	Winning score	Runner-up score
1	May 21	(United States) Doug Martin; Lost in playoff	Buick Classic	(Fiji) Vijay Singh	−6 (70-69-67-72=278)	−6 (67-70-72-69=278)
2	Aug 6	(United States) Mike Brisky; Lost in playoff	Buick Open	(United States) Woody Austin	−18 (63-68-72-67=270)	−18 (67-68-67-68=270)
3	Sep 3	(United States) Marco Dawson	Greater Milwaukee Open	(United States) Scott Hoch	−15 (68-71-65-65=269)	−12 (70-65-70-67=272)
4	Sep 24	(United States) Jonathan Kaye	Quad City Classic	(United States) D. A. Weibring	−13 (64-65-68=197)	−12 (67-66-65=198)

== See also ==
- 1994 Nike Tour graduates
