= Rick Dalpos =

American professional golfer

Personal information
- Nationality: United States
- Born: April 25, 1957 (age 69) Joliet, Illinois, U.S.
- Height: 6 ft 1 in (1.85 m)
- Weight: 210 lb (95 kg; 15 st)

Career
- Sport: Golf
- College: Purdue University
- Turned professional: 1981
- Former tours: PGA Tour; Nationwide Tour
- Professional wins: 5

Number of wins by tour
- Korn Ferry Tour: 2
- Other: 3

Best results in major championships
- Masters Tournament: DNP
- PGA Championship: DNP
- U.S. Open: CUT: 1985, 1988, 1992
- The Open Championship: DNP

Rick Dalpos (born April 25, 1957) is an American professional golfer who played on the PGA Tour and the Nationwide Tour.

== Professional career ==
In 1983, Dalpos joined the PGA Tour and played on Tour until 1989 with little success. His best finish during those years was when he finished in a tie for tenth in the 1987 Los Angeles Open. He joined the Ben Hogan Tour in 1990 and enjoyed more success, recording four top-10 finishes.

In 1991, he picked up his first win on Tour at the Ben Hogan Greater Ozarks Open. He picked up his second win the following year at the Ben Hogan Pensacola Open. That win helped him finish 8th on the money list which earned him his PGA Tour card for 1993. He struggled on Tour and then played sporadically on the Nationwide Tour for three years. He has attempted to qualifying for the Champions Tour but has been unsuccessful.

== Professional wins (5) ==
=== Ben Hogan Tour wins (2) ===
No.	Date	Tournament	Winning score	Margin of victory	Runner-up
1	Aug 18, 1991	Ben Hogan Greater Ozarks Open	−15 (70-66-65=201)	4 strokes	(United States) Kevin Sutherland
2	Apr 5, 1992	Ben Hogan Pensacola Open	−16 (66-68-70-68=272)	4 strokes	(United States) Roger Gunn

=== Other wins (3) ===
- 1990 Illinois PGA Championship
- 1991 Illinois PGA Championship
- 1995 Illinois Open Championship

== Results in major championships ==
Tournament	1985	1986	1987	1988	1989	1990	1991	1992
U.S. Open	CUT			CUT				CUT

Did not play

CUT = missed the half-way cut
Note: Dalpos only played in the U.S. Open.

== See also ==
- 1982 PGA Tour Qualifying School graduates
- 1983 PGA Tour Qualifying School graduates
- 1985 PGA Tour Qualifying School graduates
- 1986 PGA Tour Qualifying School graduates
- 1988 PGA Tour Qualifying School graduates
- 1992 Ben Hogan Tour graduates
