= 1992 PGA Tour Qualifying School graduates =

This is a list of the 43 players who earned 1993 PGA Tour cards through the PGA Tour Qualifying Tournament in 1992.

Place	Player	PGA Tour starts	Cuts made	Notes
T1	(Japan) Masahiro Kuramoto	29	17	27 Japan Golf Tour wins
T1	(United States) Skip Kendall	5	1	
T1	(Australia) Brett Ogle	4	2	1 European Tour win, 5 PGA Tour of Australasia wins
T1	(United States) Perry Moss	0	0	1 Ben Hogan Tour win
T1	(Australia) Neale Smith	0	0	
T6	(United States) Jimmy Johnston	1	0	
T6	(United States) Harry Taylor	119	59	
T6	(United States) Dave Rummells	218	139	
T9	(United States) Gene Jones	0	0	
T9	(United States) Willie Wood	240	134	
T9	(United States) Tad Rhyan	0	0	
T12	(United States) Mike Schuchart	31	7	
T12	(United States) Robin Freeman	65	20	
T12	(United States) Carl Cooper	79	23	
15	(United States) David Ogrin	289	148	
T16	(United States) Lennie Clements	302	166	1 Ben Hogan Tour win
T16	(United States) Joe Durant	1	0	
T16	(United States) Paul Goydos	0	0	1 Ben Hogan Tour win
T16	(United States) Bill Murchison	48	18	
T20	(New Zealand) Grant Waite	36	14	1 PGA Tour of Australasia win
T20	(United States) Dave Peege	28	8	
T20	(United States) J. C. Anderson	28	7	
T23	(United States) Barry Cheesman	68	15	1 Ben Hogan Tour win
T23	(United States) Dennis Trixler	111	44	
T23	(United States) Brandel Chamblee	99	39	1 Ben Hogan Tour win
T23	(United States) John Elliott	24	5	
T23	(United States) Greg Twiggs	173	76	1 PGA Tour win
T23	(United States) Kim Young	77	25	1 Ben Hogan Tour win
T23	(United States) Tom Byrum	228	122	1 PGA Tour win
T30	(Namibia) Trevor Dodds	115	57	1 Ben Hogan Tour win
T30	(United States) Marty Schiene	7	2	
T30	(United States) Jeff Cook	2	0	1 Ben Hogan Tour win
T30	(United States) Greg Cesario	2	0	
T30	(United States) Michael Bradley	4	1	
T35	(United States) Greg Kraft	30	11	
T35	(United States) John Dowdall	23	6	1 Ben Hogan Tour win
T35	(United States) Jay Overton	23	7	
T35	(United States) Eddie Pearce	121	92	
T35	(United States) Lee Porter	3	1	
T35	(United States) Len Mattiace	2	0	
T35	(United States) Michael Allen	76	35	1 European Tour win
T35	(United States) Tim Conley	1	0	
T35	(United States) David Delong	2	0	

PGA Tour rookie in 1993

== 1993 Results ==
Player	Starts	Cuts made	Best finish	Money list rank	Earnings ($)
(Japan) Masahiro Kuramoto*	21	11	T4	162	74,133
(United States) Skip Kendall*	32	18	8	129	115,189
(Australia) Brett Ogle*	18	12	Win	48	337,374
(United States) Perry Moss*	29	16	T21	171	63,565
(Australia) Neale Smith*	22	6	T64	234	11,413
(United States) Jimmy Johnston*	28	7	T7	178	54,419
(United States) Harry Taylor	29	17	T12	140	105,845
(United States) Dave Rummells	28	11	2	67	247,963
(United States) Gene Jones	21	7	T20	203	24,522
(United States) Willie Wood	25	16	T6	112	146,206
(United States) Tad Rhyan*	32	7	T2	185	50,524
(United States) Mike Schuchart	24	11	T5	172	61,492
(United States) Robin Freeman	30	14	T3	148	92,096
(United States) Carl Cooper	19	4	T30	239	10,774
(United States) David Ogrin	28	18	T4	104	155,016
(United States) Lennie Clements	25	16	T8	113	141,526
(United States) Joe Durant*	18	2	T47	279	4,055
(United States) Paul Goydos*	30	18	T13	152	87,804
(United States) Bill Murchison	19	8	T17	188	45,402
(New Zealand) Grant Waite	30	16	Win	35	411,405
(United States) Dave Peege	22	8	T16	196	33,531
(United States) J. C. Anderson	27	11	6	149	89,782
(United States) Barry Cheesman	30	13	T10	168	66,748
(United States) Dennis Trixler	29	13	T11	158	75,032
(United States) Brandel Chamblee	29	13	T9	119	126,940
(United States) John Elliott	28	14	T11	173	60,378
(United States) Greg Twiggs	29	16	T3	72	231,823
(United States) Kim Young	17	1	T60	308	2,343
(United States) Tom Byrum	26	12	T8	154	82,355
(Namibia) Trevor Dodds	30	13	T3	126	119,436
(United States) Marty Schiene*	25	7	T33	214	20,857
(United States) Jeff Cook*	29	13	T17	165	72,398
(United States) Greg Cesario*	25	7	T54	227	15,333
(United States) Michael Bradley*	26	14	T3	121	126,160
(United States) Greg Kraft	24	13	1^{†}	60	290,581
(United States) John Dowdall	22	6	T26	215	20,381
(United States) Jay Overton	13	3	T38	245	8,368
(United States) Eddie Pearce	27	6	T39	218	18,741
(United States) Lee Porter*	19	6	T32	229	14,908
(United States) Len Mattiace*	26	13	T4	160	74,521
(United States) Michael Allen	27	15	T3	73	231,072
(United States) Tim Conley*	22	10	T14	170	66,593
(United States) David Delong*	22	5	T16	213	21,059

*PGA Tour rookie in 1993
T = Tied
The player retained his PGA Tour card for 1994 (finished inside the top 125, excluding non-members)
The player did not retain his PGA Tour card for 1994, but retained conditional status (finished between 126 and 150, excluding non-members)
The player did not retain his PGA Tour card for 1994 (finished outside the top 150)
^{†}Kraft won the Deposit Guaranty Golf Classic, in which money earned was official but the win was not; Rhyan finished tied for second.

== Winners on the PGA Tour in 1993 ==
No.	Date	Player	Tournament	Winning score	Margin of victory	Runner-up
1	Feb 7	(Australia) Brett Ogle	AT&T Pebble Beach National Pro-Am	−12 (68-68-69-71=276)	3 strokes	(United States) Billy Ray Brown
2	May 23	(New Zealand) Grant Waite	Kemper Open	−9 (66-67-72-70=275)	1 stroke	(United States) Tom Kite

== Runners-up on the PGA Tour in 1993 ==
No.	Date	Player	Tournament	Winner	Winning score	Runner-up score
1	Apr 5	(United States) Dave Rummells	Buick Invitational of California	(United States) Phil Mickelson	−10 (75-69-69-65=278)	−6 (77-64-71-70=282)
2	Oct 10	(United States) Greg Kraft	Walt Disney World/Oldsmobile Classic	(United States) Jeff Maggert	−23 (66-65-66-68=265)	−20 (69-69-64-66=268)

== See also ==
- 1992 Ben Hogan Tour graduates
