= Eddie Pearce =

American golfer (born 1952)

Personal information
- Nationality: United States
- Born: March 16, 1952 (age 74) Fort Myers, Florida, U.S.
- Height: 6 ft 0 in (1.83 m)
- Weight: 175 lb (79 kg; 12.5 st)

Career
- Sport: Golf
- College: Wake Forest University
- Turned professional: 1972
- Former tours: PGA Tour; Hooters Jordan Tour
- Professional wins: 1

Best results in major championships
- Masters Tournament: T28: 1976
- PGA Championship: T32: 1974
- U.S. Open: T14: 1975
- The Open Championship: 52nd: 1975

Eddie Pearce (born March 16, 1952) is an American professional golfer.

== Early life ==
In 1952, Pearce was born in Fort Myers, Florida and grew up in Temple Terrace, Florida, where, as an infant, his first golf club was placed in his hands by the legendary Babe Didrikson Zaharias. By the time he was 12, he was shooting in the 60s and was featured as a child prodigy in Professional Golfer Magazine. He attended C. Leon King High School in nearby Tampa, Florida and was on the same high school golf team as PGA Tour veteran Gary Koch.

== Amateur career ==
As an amateur, Pearce won the Florida Boys Junior Championship for his age division in three straight years (1964–1966). He also won his age division at the "Future Masters" Tournament in seven straight years (1963–1969).

Pearce then went on to win the 1968 U.S. Junior Amateur, the Florida Open in 1970 and was awarded a golf scholarship to Wake Forest University. In 1971, Pearce was one hole away from winning the U.S. Amateur when Gary Cowan holed a long iron shot from the rough for an eagle and the win. Pearce won the 1971 North and South Amateur. He was a two-time All-American at Wake Forest (third team in 1971 and second team in 1972). He left after his sophomore year and turned pro, with many experts calling him the "next Jack Nicklaus."

== Professional career ==
Pearce played on the PGA Tour from 1974 to 1981 and again in 1993. He also played on the Ben Hogan Tour in 1992.

In 1974, the inaugural year of The Players Championship, Pearce finished in 9th place. In the 1976 Masters Tournament, Pearce was two-under par after the first two rounds before ending up the tournament tied for 28th.

Although he never won on the PGA Tour, Pearce had four runner-up finishes. In 1974, he finished second at the Hawaiian Open (behind Jack Nicklaus) and second at the Tallahassee Open (behind Allen Miller). The following year, he finished second at the Jackie Gleason-Inverrary Classic (behind Bob Murphy). Then in 1979, he finished second at the San Antonio Texas Open (behind Lou Graham).

In 2002, Pearce tried to qualify for the U.S. Senior Open but missed by one stroke and was named an alternate.

== Professional wins (1) ==
=== Hooters Jordan Tour wins (1) ===
No.	Date	Tournament	Winning score	Margin of victory	Runners-up
1	Oct 2, 1994	Naturally Fresh Cup	−12 (64-71-69=204)*	1 stroke	(United States) Paul Claxton, (United States) Kelly Korleski, (United States) Hicks Malonson, (United States) Dave Miley, (United States) Mike Swartz, (United States) Dennis Zinkon

== Results in major championships ==
Tournament	1972	1973	1974	1975	1976	1977	1978	1979
Masters Tournament	CUT				T28			
U.S. Open			59	T14	T47		CUT	T53
The Open Championship				52				
PGA Championship			T32	T54				

Did not play

CUT = missed the half-way cut
"T" = tied

== See also ==
- 1973 PGA Tour Qualifying School graduates
- 1992 PGA Tour Qualifying School graduates
