= Yuma Open =

1990 to 1993 golf tournament

Nike Yuma Open
Tournament information
- Location: Yuma, Arizona
- Established: 1990
- Course: Desert Hills Golf Course
- Par: 71
- Length: 6,822
- Tours: Ben Hogan Tour (1990–1992); Nike Tour (1993)
- Format: Stroke play
- Prize fund: US$150,000
- Month played: February
- Final year: 1993

Tournament record score
- Aggregate: 196 P. H. Horgan III (1991)
- To par: −17 as above

Final champion
- (United States) Ron Streck

Location map
- Location in the United States Location in Arizona

The Yuma Open was a professional golf tournament played each February from 1990 to 1993 at Desert Hills Golf Course in Yuma, Arizona. It was an event on the Ben Hogan Tour, the developmental circuit now known as the Korn Ferry Tour, and was called the Ben Hogan Yuma Open until 1993, when it became the Nike Yuma Open. P. H. Horgan III's winning total of 196 in 1991 set the tour's 54-hole scoring record.

== History ==
Desert Hills Golf Course, a municipal course run by the City of Yuma's parks and recreation department, was set up as a par 71 of 6,777 yards when the tournament was first played on February 9–11, 1990, in the Ben Hogan Tour's first season. (Note: The City of Yuma now lists Desert Hills as a par-72 course of about 6,800 yards, and says it has also hosted the Sunbelt Senior Tour.) All four editions were played over 54 holes. In 1990 Roger Rowland opened with a nine-under-par 62, a competitive course record, and was still in front after the second round, a stroke ahead of Rick Pearson. A closing 67 gave Pearson a 198 total and a two-shot win over Sean Pacetti and Sam Randolph. Pacetti's last two rounds, 64 and 65, were entered in the tour's records as the lowest score for consecutive rounds. Pearson did not win again that season but finished sixth on the money list.

Horgan won the 1991 edition, held February 8–10, in his debut on the Ben Hogan Tour. One stroke off the lead after 36 holes, he shot 65 on Sunday to reach 17-under-par 196 (67-64-65) and beat Olin Browne and Steve Lowery by two. No winner on the circuit had gone lower over 54 holes, though Jeff Woodland equalled the total at the Dakota Dunes Open that August, and Horgan's final two rounds matched Pacetti's 129 from the year before. Further down the leaderboard, Paul Goydos was fourth, Chris DiMarco tied for fifth, and John Daly, who would win the 1991 PGA Championship that summer, tied for 31st. Horgan added a second title at the Macon Open and ended the year third in earnings.

Goydos came back to win in 1992. The tournament opened the season that year, on February 14–16, with the purse raised from $100,000 to $125,000 and the course measuring 6,822 yards. He was one of four players tied at 133 going into the final round and shot 68 to finish one stroke ahead of Jeff Coston and Taylor Smith. At the time he was a substitute teacher in Long Beach. He earned a PGA Tour card for 1993 through the qualifying tournament, and according to Sports Illustrated, Yuma remained his most recent win until he took the 1996 Bay Hill Invitational, his first PGA Tour title.

Nike replaced the Ben Hogan Company as the tour's title sponsor in 1993, a change announced the previous August. The renamed Nike Yuma Open again started the season, on February 19–21, and 67 players made the cut, more than at any other event that year. Tim Petrovic led by two at the halfway point, but Ron Streck and DiMarco finished tied at 201, Streck helped by a second-round 64 and DiMarco by a closing 65. Streck won with a par on the second playoff hole. It was his only title on the developmental tour; after he won on the Champions Tour in 2005, the PGA Tour recognized him as the first golfer to have won on all three of its circuits. The tournament was not on the 1994 schedule, which opened with the Nike Inland Empire Open.

== Winners ==
Year	Winner	Score	To par	Margin of victory	Runner(s)-up	Purse ($)	Winner's share ($)	Ref.
Nike Yuma Open
1993	(United States) Ron Streck	201	−12	Playoff	(United States) Chris DiMarco	150,000	27,000	
Ben Hogan Yuma Open
1992	(United States) Paul Goydos	201	−12	1 stroke	(United States) Jeff Coston (United States) Taylor Smith	125,000	25,000	
1991	(United States) P. H. Horgan III	196	−17	2 strokes	(United States) Olin Browne (United States) Steve Lowery	100,000	20,000	
1990	(United States) Rick Pearson	198	−15	2 strokes	(United States) Sean Pacetti (United States) Sam Randolph	100,000	20,000	
