= John Dowdall =

American professional golfer (born 1960)

Personal information
- Full name: John N. Dowdall
- Nationality: United States
- Born: June 23, 1960 (age 66) Shreveport, Louisiana, U.S.
- Height: 5 ft 11 in (1.80 m)
- Weight: 185 lb (84 kg; 13.2 st)

Career
- Sport: Golf
- College: Northeast Louisiana University
- Turned professional: 1997 (Note: Amateur status reinstated in 2005.)
- Former tours: PGA Tour; Ben Hogan Tour; U.S. Golf Tour
- Professional wins: 2

Number of wins by tour
- Korn Ferry Tour: 1
- Other: 1

John N. Dowdall (born June 23, 1960) is an American professional golfer.

== Early life and amateur career ==
Dowdall was born in Shreveport, Louisiana. He played college golf at Northeast Louisiana University

== Professional career ==
Dowdall turned professional and played on the Ben Hogan Tour (now Nationwide Tour) and PGA Tour from 1990 to 1997. On the Ben Hogan Tour (1992, 1994–96), his best finish was a win at the 1992 Ben Hogan Hawkeye Open. On the PGA Tour (1990, 1993, 1997), his best finish was T-26 at the 1993 Shell Houston Open.

== Reinstated amateur status ==
Dowdall was re-instated as an amateur.

== Professional wins (2) ==
=== Ben Hogan Tour wins (1) ===
No.	Date	Tournament	Winning score	Margin of victory	Runner-up
1	Jul 26, 1992	Ben Hogan Hawkeye Open	−8 (67-67=134) (Note: Shortened to 36 holes due to weather.)	1 stroke	(United States) Kevin Sutherland

=== U.S. Golf Tour wins (1) ===
No.	Date	Tournament	Winning score	Margin of victory	Runners-up
1	Jun 9, 1991	Indian Hills Open	−25 (64-63-66-66=259)	3 strokes	(United States) Greg Parker, (United States) John Riegger

== See also ==
- 1992 PGA Tour Qualifying School graduates
- 1996 PGA Tour Qualifying School graduates
