= Perry Moss (golfer) =

American professional golfer (born 1969)

Personal information
- Nationality: United States
- Born: July 12, 1969 (age 57) Shreveport, Louisiana, U.S.
- Height: 6 ft 0 in (1.83 m)
- Weight: 210 lb (95 kg; 15 st)

Career
- Sport: Golf
- College: Louisiana State University
- Turned professional: 1991
- Former tours: PGA Tour; Nationwide Tour
- Professional wins: 3

Number of wins by tour
- Korn Ferry Tour: 1
- Other: 1

Best results in major championships
- Masters Tournament: DNP
- PGA Championship: DNP
- U.S. Open: CUT: 1998
- The Open Championship: DNP

Perry Moss (born July 12, 1969) is an American professional golfer.

== Career ==
Moss was born in Shreveport, Louisiana. He played college golf at Louisiana State University where he won twice and was a two-time All-American.

In 1991, Moss turned professional. In 1992, he played on the Ben Hogan Tour winning once at the Ben Hogan Texarkana Open. He earned joint medalist honors at the 1992 PGA Tour Qualifying School to earn his PGA Tour card for 1993. He would play both tours through 2002: the Nationwide Tour in 1992, 1994, 1996, 1998, and 2001–02, and the PGA Tour 1993, and 1999–2000, where his best finish was T-3 at the 1999 Southern Farm Bureau Classic. He has played mini-tours since then while dealing with intestinal and hip problems.

== Professional wins (2) ==
=== Ben Hogan Tour wins (1) ===
No.	Date	Tournament	Winning score	Margin of victory	Runners-up
1	Aug 16, 1992	Ben Hogan Texarkana Open	−19 (65-66-66=197)	6 strokes	(Namibia) Trevor Dodds, (United States) Marty Schiene

=== Other wins (1) ===
- 1991 Peru Open

== Results in major championships ==
Tournament	1998
U.S. Open	CUT

CUT = missed the halfway cut
Note: Moss only played in the U.S. Open.

== See also ==
- 1992 PGA Tour Qualifying School graduates
- 1998 PGA Tour Qualifying School graduates
