= Gene Jones (golfer) =

American golfer (born 1957)

Personal information
- Full name: Thomas Eugene Jones Jr.
- Nationality: United States
- Born: September 22, 1957 (age 69) High Point, North Carolina, U.S.
- Height: 5 ft 8 in (1.73 m)
- Weight: 155 lb (70 kg; 11.1 st)

Career
- Sport: Golf
- College: University of Florida
- Turned professional: 1975
- Former tours: PGA Tour, Nike Tour, Champions Tour
- Professional wins: 9

Thomas Eugene Jones Jr. (born September 22, 1957) is an American professional golfer. He has played on the PGA Tour and Champions Tour.

== Early life and amateur career ==
Jones was born in High Point, North Carolina, the son of a golf professional. His brothers, Mike and Mark, also became professional golfers. He attended Lyman High School in Longwood, Florida, before receiving a golf scholarship to the University of Florida.

== Professional career ==
In 1975, Jones turned professional. He played one season on the PGA Tour, in 1993, having qualified via the 1992 qualifying school, but struggled with a wrist injury and only had one top-20 finish. He played on the Nike Tour the following season. He also played on several mini-tours, winning a few tournaments.

He became eligible to play on the Champions Tour after reaching the age of 50 in September 2007. In his first two seasons, he had four second-place finishes.

== Professional wins (9) ==
- 1993 Greater Erie Charity Golf Classic
- 2005 South Carolina Senior Open, Grapefruit Open
- 2006 Grapefruit Open
- 2007 South Carolina Senior Open, Patriot Invitational
- 2008 South Carolina Senior Open, Patriot Invitational, North Florida Senior PGA Championship

== See also ==
- 1992 PGA Tour Qualifying School graduates
