= Jerry Anderson (golfer) =

Canadian professional golfer

Personal information
- Full name: Gerald Ashton Anderson
- Nationality: Canada
- Born: 22 September 1955 Montreal, Quebec, Canada
- Died: 9 March 2018 (aged 62) Kitchener, Ontario, Canada
- Height: 1.70 m (5 ft 7 in)
- Spouse: Barbara (Page) Anderson
- Children: 2

Career
- Sport: Golf
- Turned professional: 1977
- Former tours: PGA Tour; European Tour; Canadian Tour
- Professional wins: 11

Number of wins by tour
- European Tour: 1
- Korn Ferry Tour: 1
- Other: 9

Best results in major championships
- Masters Tournament: DNP
- PGA Championship: DNP
- U.S. Open: CUT: 1992
- The Open Championship: CUT: 1985, 1986, 1987

Achievements and awards
- Canadian Tour Order of Merit winner: 1989
- Canadian Golf Hall of Fame: 2025

Gerald Ashton Anderson (22 September 1955 – 9 March 2018) was a Canadian professional golfer.

== Early life ==
Anderson was born in Montreal, Quebec and then moved to Cambridge, Ontario.

== Professional career ==
Anderson played on the European Tour for most of the 1980s. In 1984 he won the Ebel European Masters – Swiss Open, by shooting a 27 under par total of 261, which was a record 72-hole score to par on the European Tour until Ernie Els shot a 29 under par score at the 2003 Johnnie Walker Classic. Anderson finished ninth on the European Tour Order of Merit in 1984, making it into the top fifty. He was a member of the U.S.-based PGA Tour in 1990 and 1992. He represented Canada at the Alfred Dunhill Cup in 1985 and at the World Cup in 1983, 1987, and 1989.

== Personal life ==
Anderson died in Kitchener, Ontario in 2018 at the age of 62.

== Awards and honors ==
- In 1989, Anderson earned the Canadian Tour's Order of Merit
- In 2002, he was inducted into the Ontario Golf Hall of Fame
- In 2016, Anderson earned entry into the PGA of Canada Hall of Fame
- In 2020, Anderson earned entry into the PGA of Ontario Hall of Fame
- In 2025, Anderson was inducted into the Canadian Golf Hall of Fame

== Professional wins (11) ==
=== European Tour wins (1) ===
No.	Date	Tournament	Winning score	Margin of victory	Runner-up
1	2 Sep 1984	Ebel European Masters Swiss Open	−27 (63-66-66-66=261)	5 strokes	(England) Howard Clark

=== Ben Hogan Tour wins (1) ===
No.	Date	Tournament	Winning score	Margin of victory	Runners-up
1	25 Aug 1991	Ben Hogan Texarkana Open	−15 (65-68-68=201)	Playoff	(United States) Fran Quinn

Ben Hogan Tour playoff record (1–1)

No.	Year	Tournament	Opponent(s)	Result
1	1991	Ben Hogan Fort Wayne Open	(United States) Bob Friend, (United States) Dennis Trixler	Friend won with birdie on fourth extra hole
2	1991	Ben Hogan Texarkana Open	(United States) Fran Quinn	Won with par on first extra hole

=== Canadian Tour wins (3) ===
No.	Date	Tournament	Winning score	Margin of victory	Runner(s)-up
1	13 Sep 1987	CPGA Championship	−13 (65-70-68-68=271)	Playoff	(United States) Kirk Triplett
2	23 Jul 1989	Windsor Charity Classic	−23 (66-64-69-66=265)	3 strokes	(Canada) Martin Gates, (United States) Kelly Gibson
3	10 Sep 1989	Canadian Tournament Players Championship	−18 (67-66-69-68=270)	2 strokes	(United States) Dave DeLong, (Canada) Brent Franklin

=== Earlier Canadian wins (6) ===
No.	Date	Tournament	Winning score	Margin of victory	Runner(s)-up
1	17 Jun 1979	Ontario Open	−5 (68-69-68=205)	3 strokes	(Canada) Bob Beauchemin
2	29 Jul 1979	Manitoba Open	−4 (69-70-73=212)	2 strokes	(Canada) Greg Pidlaski
3	4 Aug 1979	Molson Saskatchewan Open	−8 (208)	1 stroke	(Canada) Bob Beauchemin, (Canada) Jim Rutledge
4	9 Aug 1980	Molson Saskatchewan Open (2)	−9 (68-67-72=207)	Playoff	(Canada) Scott Knapp
5	27 Jun 1982	Lactantia Quebec Open	−8 (68-65-72=205)	3 strokes	(Canada) Bob Panasik
6	3 Jul 1983	Lactantia Quebec Open (2)	−7 (73-67-66=206)	3 strokes	(Canada) William Holzman (a)

== Results in major championships ==
Tournament	1985	1986	1987	1988	1989	1990	1991	1992
U.S. Open								CUT
The Open Championship	CUT	CUT	CUT					

Did not play

CUT = missed the half-way cut
Note: Anderson never played in the Masters Tournament or the PGA Championship.

== Canadian national team appearances ==
Professional

- World Cup: 1983, 1987, 1989
- Dunhill Cup: 1985

== See also ==
- 1989 PGA Tour Qualifying School graduates
- 1991 Ben Hogan Tour graduates
