= Greg Kraft =

American golfer (born 1964)

Personal information
- Nationality: United States
- Born: April 4, 1964 (age 62) Detroit, Michigan, U.S.
- Height: 5 ft 11 in (1.80 m)
- Weight: 180 lb (82 kg; 13 st)

Career
- Sport: Golf
- College: University of Tampa
- Turned professional: 1986
- Current tour: Champions Tour
- Former tours: PGA Tour; Nationwide Tour
- Professional wins: 3
- Highest ranking: 89 (January 23, 2000)

Number of wins by tour
- PGA Tour: 1
- Korn Ferry Tour: 1

Best results in major championships
- Masters Tournament: DNP
- PGA Championship: T23: 1998
- U.S. Open: T53: 1999
- The Open Championship: T47: 1994

Greg Kraft (born April 4, 1964) is an American professional golfer who has played on the Nationwide Tour and the PGA Tour.

== Career ==
Kraft was born in Detroit, Michigan. He graduated from the University of Tampa in 1986 and turned professional later that year. He played on the Nationwide Tour in 1990, 1991, and 2005; and on the PGA Tour from 1992 to 2004, and 2006 to 2010. He has one win on each tour.

In 2003, he sued the PGA Tour, alleging they failed to properly warn golfers of the possibility of contracting Coccidioidomycosis (valley fever). The lawsuit was eventually dismissed.

In 2008, Kraft won the inaugural Puerto Rico Open in his 379th PGA Tour start. His last PGA Tour event was the 2011 Puerto Rico Open. Upon turning 50, Kraft joined the Champions Tour.

== Professional wins (3) ==
=== PGA Tour wins (1) ===
No.	Date	Tournament	Winning score	Margin of victory	Runners-up
1	Mar 23, 2008	Puerto Rico Open	−14 (69-66-69-70=274)	1 stroke	(United States) Jerry Kelly, (United States) Bo Van Pelt

=== Nationwide Tour wins (1) ===
No.	Date	Tournament	Winning score	Margin of victory	Runner-up
1	Jun 26, 2005	Northeast Pennsylvania Classic	−17 (65-64-68-70=267)	2 strokes	(United States) Timothy O'Neal

=== Other wins (1) ===
No.	Date	Tournament	Winning score	Margin of victory	Runners-up
1	Apr 11, 1993	Deposit Guaranty Golf Classic	−13 (65-70-64-68=267)	1 stroke	(United States) Morris Hatalsky, (United States) Tad Rhyan

== Results in major championships ==
Tournament	1994	1995	1996	1997	1998	1999	2000	2001	2002	2003	2004	2005	2006	2007	2008	2009
U.S. Open				T68		T53							CUT			CUT
The Open Championship	T47															
PGA Championship	T47	CUT	CUT		T23	T61	T69								CUT	

Note: Kraft never played in the Masters Tournament.

Did not play

CUT = missed the half-way cut
"T" = tied

== Results in The Players Championship ==
Tournament	1994	1995	1996	1997	1998	1999	2000	2001	2002	2003	2004	2005	2006	2007	2008	2009
The Players Championship	T78	CUT		CUT		T62	T22	T65	CUT						T10	CUT

Top 10
Did not play

CUT = missed the halfway cut
"T" indicates a tie for a place

== Results in World Golf Championships ==
Tournament	2001
Match Play	R64
Championship	NT^{1}
Invitational	

^{1}Cancelled due to 9/11

Did not play

QF, R16, R32, R64 = Round in which player lost in match play
NT = No tournament

== See also ==
- 1991 PGA Tour Qualifying School graduates
- 1992 PGA Tour Qualifying School graduates
- 1995 PGA Tour Qualifying School graduates
- 2005 PGA Tour Qualifying School graduates
