= 1985 PGA Tour Qualifying School graduates =

This is a list of the 1985 PGA Tour Qualifying School graduates.

== History ==
Fifty players earned their 1986 PGA Tour card through Q-School in 1985. The tournament was played over 108 holes at the Grenelefe Golf and Tennis Resort, West and South courses, in Haines City, Florida. The top 50 players split the $100,000 purse, with the winner earning $15,000. Peter McWhinney lost a six-for-five playoff for the last cards.

Burmese golfer Kyi Hla Han was trying to become the second Burmese, after Mya Aye, to make it onto the PGA Tour. However, he was unable to move onto the finals, playing poorly in the final round of his regional qualifying tournament in California.

== List of graduates ==
Place	Player	Notes
1	(United States) Tom Sieckmann	3 Asia Golf Circuit wins
2	(United States) Tom Pernice Jr.	
3	(United States) Tom Byrum	
4	(United States) Dick Mast	
5	(Australia) Peter Senior	3 PGA Tour of Australia wins
6	(United States) Brian Mogg	
T7	(United States) Davis Love III	
T7	(United States) Blaine McCallister	
T9	(United States) Jeff Grygiel	
T9	(United States) Stu Ingraham	
T9	(United States) Robert Wrenn	1 Asia Golf Circuit win
T12	(United States) Mike Hulbert	
T12	(Argentina) Eduardo Romero	
T14	(United States) Bill Israelson	1 Asia Golf Circuit win
T14	(United States) Gregory Ladehoff	
T14	(United States) Billy Pierot	
T17	(United States) David Peoples	
T17	(United States) Dave Rummells	
T17	(United States) Mike West	
T20	(United States) Charlie Bolling	
T20	(United States) Andy Dillard	
T20	(United States) Rick Fehr	
T20	(United States) Mike McCullough	Runner-up at 1977 Players Championship
T20	(United States) Kris Moe	
T25	(United States) Mark Brooks	
T25	(Mexico) Antonio Cerdá Jr.	
T25	(United States) Jim Dent	Winner of 1983 Michelob-Chattanooga Gold Cup Classic
T25	(United States) Doug Johnson	
T25	(United States) John McComish	
T25	(United States) Rocco Mediate	
T31	(United States) Rick Cramer	
T31	(United States) Rod Curl	1 PGA Tour win
T31	(United States) Jeff Lewis	
T31	(United States) Mike Miles	
T35	(United States) John Adams	2 runner-ups on PGA Tour
T35	(United States) Danny Briggs	
T35	(United States) Tom Gleeton	
T35	(United States) Denny Helper	
T39	(United States) Rick Dalpos	
T39	(Namibia) Trevor Dodds	
T39	(United States) David Lundstrom	
T39	(United States) Mike Nicolette	1 PGA Tour win
T39	(United States) Bob Pancratz	
T39	(United States) Harry Taylor	
T39	(United States) Dennis Trixler	
T46	(United States) Brian Claar	
T46	(United States) Ernie Gonzalez	
T46	(United States) Mike Gove	
T46	(United States) Adrian Stills	
T46	(United States) Mike Sullivan	1 PGA Tour win
