= 1990 Ben Hogan Tour =

Golf tour season

1990 Ben Hogan Tour season
- Duration: February 2, 1990 – October 21, 1990
- Number of official events: 30
- Most wins: (United States) Dick Mast (3) (United States) Jim McGovern (3) (United States) Mike Springer (3)
- Money list: (United States) Jeff Maggert
- Player of the Year: (United States) Jeff Maggert

The 1990 Ben Hogan Tour was the inaugural season of the Ben Hogan Tour, the official development tour to the PGA Tour.

== Schedule ==
The following table lists official events during the 1990 season.

Date	Tournament	Location	Purse (US$)	Winner (Note: The number in parentheses after each winner's name is the number of Ben Hogan Tour events they had won up to and including that tournament. This information is only shown for Ben Hogan Tour members. It is rare for someone to accumulate many wins on the Ben Hogan Tour as success at this level usually leads to promotion to the PGA Tour.)	Notes
Feb 4	Ben Hogan Bakersfield Open	California	100,000	(United States) Mike Springer (1)	
Feb 11	Ben Hogan Yuma Open	Arizona	100,000	(United States) Rick Pearson (1)	
Mar 4	Ben Hogan South Texas Open	Texas	100,000	(United States) Brad Bell (1)	
Mar 11	Ben Hogan Baton Rouge Open	Louisiana	100,000	(United States) Dicky Thompson (1)	
Mar 18	Ben Hogan Gulf Coast Classic	Mississippi	100,000	(United States) Dick Mast (1)	
Mar 25	Ben Hogan Panama City Beach Classic	Florida	100,000	(United States) Buddy Gardner (1)	
Apr 1	Ben Hogan Lake City Classic	Florida	100,000	(United States) Jim McGovern (1)	
Apr 15	Ben Hogan Pensacola Open	Florida	100,000	(United States) Dick Mast (2)	
Apr 22	Ben Hogan Gateway Open	Florida	100,000	(United States) Ted Tryba (1)	
Apr 29	Ben Hogan Macon Open	Georgia	100,000	(United States) Ed Humenik (1)	
May 13	Ben Hogan Knoxville Open	Tennessee	100,000	(United States) Jeff Maggert (1)	
May 20	Ben Hogan Elizabethtown Open	Kentucky	100,000	(United States) Dicky Thompson (2)	
Jun 3	Ben Hogan Quicksilver Open	Pennsylvania	150,000	(United States) R. W. Eaks (1)	
Jun 10	Ben Hogan Quail Hollow Open	Ohio	100,000	(United States) Barry Cheesman (1)	
Jun 17	Ben Hogan Fort Wayne Open	Indiana	100,000	(United States) Dick Mast (3)	
Jul 1	Ben Hogan Central New York Classic	New York	100,000	(United States) Tom Garner (1)	
Jul 8	Ben Hogan New Haven Open	Connecticut	100,000	(United States) Jim McGovern (2)	
Jul 15	Ben Hogan New England Classic	Maine	100,000	(United States) Brandel Chamblee (1)	
Jul 22	Ben Hogan Buffalo Open	New York	100,000	(United States) Jeff Maggert (2)	
Aug 5	Ben Hogan Dakota Dunes Open	South Dakota	100,000	(United States) Kim Young (1)	
Aug 12	Ben Hogan Kansas City Classic	Kansas	100,000	(Namibia) Trevor Dodds (1)	
Aug 19	Ben Hogan Greater Ozarks Open	Missouri	100,000	(United States) Jeff Cook (1)	
Aug 26	Ben Hogan Reflection Ridge	Kansas	100,000	(United States) Tom Lehman (1)	
Sep 2	Ben Hogan Texarkana Open	Arkansas	100,000	(United States) Jim McGovern (3)	
Sep 9	Ben Hogan Amarillo Open	Texas	100,000	(United States) Lindy Miller (1)	
Sep 16	Ben Hogan Utah Classic	Utah	100,000	(United States) John Daly (1)	
Sep 23	Ben Hogan Boise Open	Idaho	100,000	(United States) Ricky Smallridge (1)	
Sep 30	Ben Hogan Reno Open	Nevada	100,000	(United States) Mike Springer (2)	
Oct 7	Ben Hogan Santa Rosa Open	California	100,000	(United States) Ed Humenik (2)	
Oct 21	Ben Hogan El Paso Open	Texas	100,000	(United States) Mike Springer (3)	

== Money list ==
The money list was based on prize money won during the season, calculated in U.S. dollars. The top five players on the money list earned status to play on the 1991 PGA Tour.

Position	Player	Prize money ($)
1	(United States) Jeff Maggert	108,644
2	(United States) Jim McGovern	99,841
3	(United States) Dick Mast	92,521
4	(United States) Mike Springer	82,906
5	(United States) Ed Humenik	78,753

== Awards ==
Award	Winner	Ref.
Player of the Year (Jack Nicklaus Trophy)	(United States) Jeff Maggert	
