= Tim Loustalot =

American golfer

Personal information
- Nationality: United States
- Born: April 9, 1965 (age 61) Sacramento, California, U.S.
- Height: 5 ft 9 in (1.75 m)
- Weight: 165 lb (75 kg; 11.8 st)

Career
- Sport: Golf
- College: Fresno State University
- Turned professional: 1988
- Former tour: PGA Tour
- Professional wins: 2

Number of wins by tour
- Korn Ferry Tour: 2

Best results in major championships
- Masters Tournament: DNP
- PGA Championship: DNP
- U.S. Open: CUT: 1999
- The Open Championship: DNP

Tim Loustalot (born April 9, 1965) is an American professional golfer who played on the PGA Tour and the Nationwide Tour.

== Career ==
Loustalot joined the Nationwide Tour in 1990. He picked up his first victory on Tour in 1992 at the Ben Hogan Lake City Classic. He went through qualifying school in 1994 to earn his PGA Tour card for 1995. He returned to the Nationwide Tour in 1996 where he picked up his second victory at the NIKE Shreveport Open. He went through qualifying school for the second time in 1997 and returned to the PGA Tour in 1998. He had a better year on Tour than in his rookie season which included finishing in a tie for second at the Deposit Guaranty Golf Classic but he had to go to qualifying school to retain his card and he was successful. After a poor season in 1999 he returned to the Nationwide Tour in 2000 which was his last season on Tour.

Loustalot is currently the head professional at DeLaveaga Golf Club in Santa Cruz, California.

== Professional wins (2) ==
=== Nike Tour wins (2) ===
No.	Date	Tournament	Winning score	Margin of victory	Runner-up
1	Mar 15, 1992	Ben Hogan Lake City Classic	−10 (68-68-70=206)	1 stroke	(United States) Jack Larkin
2	Apr 28, 1996	Nike Shreveport Open	−11 (73-70-66-68=277)	1 stroke	(United States) Joe Durant

== Results in major championships ==
Tournament	1999
U.S. Open	CUT

CUT = missed the halfway cut
Note: Loustalot only played in the U.S. Open.

== See also ==
- 1994 PGA Tour Qualifying School graduates
- 1997 PGA Tour Qualifying School graduates
- 1998 PGA Tour Qualifying School graduates
