= Hawkeye Open =

Golf tournament

Nike Hawkeye Open
Tournament information
- Location: Iowa City, Iowa
- Established: 1991
- Course: Finkbine Golf Course
- Par: 71
- Tour: Nike Tour
- Format: Stroke play
- Prize fund: $150,000
- Month played: July
- Final year: 1993

Tournament record score
- Aggregate: 199 Olin Browne (1991)
- To par: −14 as above

Final champion
- (United States) Dave Stockton Jr.
- Location in the United States Location in Iowa

The Hawkeye Open was a golf tournament on the Nike Tour. It ran from 1991 to 1993. It was played at Finkbine Golf Course in Iowa City, Iowa.

In 1993 the winner earned $27,000.

== Winners ==
| Year | Winner | Score | To par | Margin of victory | Runner(s)-up | Ref. |
Nike Hawkeye Open
| 1993 | (United States) Dave Stockton Jr. | 200 | −13 | 4 strokes | (United States) Mike Heinen | |
Ben Hogan Hawkeye Open
| 1992 | (United States) John Dowdall | 134 (Note: Shortened to 36 holes due to rain.) | −8 | 1 stroke | (United States) Kevin Sutherland | |
| 1991 | (United States) Olin Browne | 199 | −14 | 2 strokes | (United States) John Ross (United States) Ted Tryba | |
