= Kim Young (American golfer) =

American professional golfer (born 1955)

Personal information
- Nationality: United States
- Born: February 4, 1955 (age 71) Harlingen, Texas, U.S.
- Height: 5 ft 11 in (1.80 m)
- Weight: 165 lb (75 kg; 11.8 st)

Career
- Sport: Golf
- College: Valencia Community College
- Turned professional: 1975
- Former tour: PGA Tour
- Professional wins: 1

Number of wins by tour
- Korn Ferry Tour: 1

Best results in major championships
- Masters Tournament: DNP
- PGA Championship: DNP
- U.S. Open: CUT: 1984, 1995
- The Open Championship: DNP

Kim Young (born February 4, 1955) is an American professional golfer.

== Professional career ==
Young played several years on the PGA Tour and its developmental tour from 1977 to 1994. On The PGA Tour (1977–78, 1988, 1991–93), his best finish was T-4 at the 1988 Deposit Guaranty Golf Classic. On the developmental tour (1990, 1994) his best finish was a win at the 1990 Ben Hogan Dakota Dunes Open. His tournament golf career was cut short after he lost the vision in his right eye in 1995.

Young tried unsuccessfully to qualify for the Champions Tour in 2005, 2008, and 2010. He did qualify and play in for the U.S. Senior Open in 2008 and 2009.

Young is a director of golf at Twin Rivers Golf Club in Oviedo, Florida and also is a golf instructor.

== Professional wins (1) ==
=== Ben Hogan Tour wins (1) ===
No.	Date	Tournament	Winning score	Margin of victory	Runners-up
1	Aug 5, 1990	Ben Hogan Dakota Dunes Open	−19 (62-65-70=197)	1 stroke	(United States) Mike Springer, (United States) Steve Stricker

== See also ==
- 1987 PGA Tour Qualifying School graduates
- 1990 PGA Tour Qualifying School graduates
- 1991 PGA Tour Qualifying School graduates
- 1992 PGA Tour Qualifying School graduates
