= Mississippi Gulf Coast Classic =

Nike Mississippi Gulf Coast Classic
Tournament information
- Location: Gulfport, Mississippi
- Established: 1990
- Course: Windance Country Club
- Par: 72
- Tour: Nike Tour
- Format: Stroke play
- Prize fund: US$200,000
- Month played: April
- Final year: 1997

Tournament record score
- Aggregate: 273 Allen Doyle (1995); 273 Franklin Langham (1995); 273 Joe Durant (1996)
- To par: −15 as above

Final champion
- (United States) Jeff Brehaut
- Location in the United States Location in Mississippi

The Mississippi Gulf Coast Classic was a golf tournament on the Nike Tour from 1990 to 1997. It was played at the Windance Country Club in Gulfport, Mississippi from 1990 to 1995 and at the Mississippi National Golf Club in Gautier, Mississippi from 1996 to 1997.

== Winners ==
| Year | Winner | Score | To par | Margin of victory | Runner(s)-up |
Nike Mississippi Gulf Coast Classic
| 1997 | (United States) Jeff Brehaut | 275 | −13 | 6 strokes | (Canada) Ahmad Bateman (United States) Tom Scherrer |
| 1996 | (United States) Joe Durant | 273 | −15 | 1 stroke | (United States) Brett Quigley (United States) Dave Rummells |
| 1995 | (United States) Allen Doyle | 273 | −15 | Playoff | (United States) Franklin Langham |
| 1994 | (United States) John Elliott | 276 | −12 | Playoff | (United States) Chris Perry |
| 1993 | (United States) Jim Furyk | 206 | −10 | Playoff | (United States) Bob Friend |
Ben Hogan Gulf Coast Classic
| 1992 | (Canada) Glen Hnatiuk | 207 | −9 | 1 stroke | (United States) Mike Donald (United States) John Flannery (United States) Bruce Zabriski |
| 1991 | (United States) Tom Lehman | 137 (Note: Shortened to 54 holes due to rain.) | −7 | Playoff | (United States) Tim Straub (United States) John Wilson |
| 1990 | (United States) Dick Mast | 137 | −7 | Playoff | (United States) Rick Pearson |

== See also ==
- Mississippi Gulf Coast Open - a later Mississippi Gulf Coast tournament
