= Lake City Classic =

Ben Hogan Lake City Classic
Tournament information
- Location: Lake City, Florida
- Established: 1990
- Course: Lake City Country Club
- Par: 72
- Tour: Ben Hogan Tour
- Format: Stroke play
- Prize fund: US$125,000
- Month played: March
- Final year: 1992

Tournament record score
- Aggregate: 198 Don Reese (1991)
- To par: −18 as above

Final champion
- (United States) Tim Loustalot
- Location in the United States Location in Florida

The Lake City Classic was a golf tournament on the Ben Hogan Tour. It ran from 1990 to 1992. It was played at Lake City Country Club in Lake City, Florida.

In 1992 the winner earned $25,000.

== Winners ==
Year	Winner	Score	To par	Margin of victory	Runner-up
Ben Hogan Lake City Classic
1992	(United States) Tim Loustalot	206	−10	1 stroke	(United States) Jack Larkin
1991	(United States) Don Reese	198	−18	1 stroke	(United States) Roger Rowland
1990	(United States) Jim McGovern	202	−14	Playoff	(United States) David Toms
