= Central New York Classic (golf) =

Golf tournament

Ben Hogan Central New York Classic
Tournament information
- Location: Hamilton, New York
- Established: 1990
- Course: Seven Oaks Golf Course
- Par: 72
- Tour: Ben Hogan Tour
- Format: Stroke play
- Prize fund: US$100,000
- Month played: June/July
- Final year: 1990

Tournament record score
- Aggregate: 207 Tom Garner (1990)
- To par: −9 as above

Final champion
- (United States) Tom Garner
- Location in the United States Location in New York

The Central New York Classic was a golf tournament on the Ben Hogan Tour. It was only played in 1990. It was played at Colgate University's Seven Oaks Golf Course in Hamilton, New York. Tom Garner won the $100,000 event, earning $20,000.

The organizing charity decided not to sponsor the tournament again in 1991 and efforts to move the tournament to the Syracuse, New York area failed due to potential conflicts with the Senior PGA Tour event in the area, the MONY Syracuse Senior Classic.

== Winners ==
| Year | Winner | Score | To par | Margin of victory | Runners-up | Ref |
Ben Hogan Central New York Classic
| 1990 | (United States) Tom Garner | 207 | −9 | 1 stroke | (United States) Ed Humenik (United States) Andy Morse (United States) Brian Watts | |
