= Don Reese (golfer) =

American golfer (born 1953)

Personal information
- Nationality: United States
- Born: December 7, 1953 (age 72) Oconto Falls, Wisconsin, U.S.
- Height: 6 ft 0 in (1.83 m)
- Weight: 205 lb (93 kg; 14.6 st)

Career
- Sport: Golf
- College: Troy State University
- Turned professional: 1979
- Former tours: PGA Tour; Nationwide Tour; Champions Tour
- Professional wins: 4

Number of wins by tour
- Korn Ferry Tour: 1
- Other: 3

Best results in major championships
- Masters Tournament: DNP
- PGA Championship: DNP
- U.S. Open: CUT: 1986, 1989
- The Open Championship: DNP

Don Reese (born December 7, 1953) is an American professional golfer.

== Early life and amateur career ==
In 1953, Reese was born in Oconto Falls, Wisconsin. He played college golf at Troy State University where he was an All-American.

== Professional career ==
In 1979, Reese turned professional. He played on the PGA Tour, Nationwide Tour, and Champions Tour while also working as a club professional. On the PGA Tour (1982, 1989–90, 1994–95), his best finish was T-5 at the 1989 Hawaiian Open.

Reese played on the PGA Tour's developmental tour for most of the 1990s. He won the 1991 Ben Hogan Lake City Classic.

After he turned 50, Reese played on the Champions Tour, his best finish was a pair of T-10s at the 2005 Turtle Bay Championship and the 2005 SBC Classic.

== Professional wins (4) ==
=== Ben Hogan Tour wins (1) ===
No.	Date	Tournament	Winning score	Margin of victory	Runner-up
1	Apr 7, 1991	Ben Hogan Lake City Classic	−18 (67-66-65=198)	1 stroke	(United States) Roger Rowland

=== Other wins (3) ===
- 1983 Long Island Open
- 1985 Metropolitan PGA Championship
- 1986 Metropolitan PGA Championship

== Results in major championships ==
Tournament	1986	1987	1988	1989
U.S. Open	CUT			CUT

Did not play

CUT = missed the halfway cut
Note: Reese only played in the U.S. Open.

== See also ==
- Spring 1981 PGA Tour Qualifying School graduates
- 1988 PGA Tour Qualifying School graduates
- 1993 PGA Tour Qualifying School graduates
- 1994 PGA Tour Qualifying School graduates
