= 2017 European Senior Tour =

Golf tour season

2017 European Senior Tour season
- Duration: 16 March 2017 – 10 December 2017
- Number of official events: 15
- Most wins: (England) Paul Broadhurst (2) (United States) Clark Dennis (2) (England) Philip Golding (2) (Germany) Bernhard Langer (2)
- Order of Merit: (United States) Clark Dennis
- Rookie of the Year: (United States) Clark Dennis

The 2017 European Senior Tour was the 26th season of the European Senior Tour, the main professional golf tour in Europe for men aged 50 and over.

== Schedule ==
The following table lists official events during the 2017 season.

Date	Tournament	Host country	Purse (€)	Winner (Note: The number in brackets after each winner's name is the number of European Senior Tour events they had won up to and including that tournament. This information is only shown for European Senior Tour members.)	Notes
18 Mar	Sharjah Senior Golf Masters	UAE	US$425,000	(South Africa) Chris Williams (2)	New tournament
28 May	KitchenAid Senior PGA Championship	United States	US$2,800,000	(Germany) Bernhard Langer (5)	Senior major championship
23 Jun	European Tour Properties Senior Classic	Finland	250,000	(Spain) Santiago Luna (3)	New tournament
2 Jul	U.S. Senior Open	United States	US$4,000,000	(United States) Kenny Perry (n/a)	Senior major championship (Note: Official win; unofficial money.)
9 Jul	Swiss Seniors Open	Switzerland	300,000	(England) Philip Golding (3)	
16 Jul	WINSTONgolf Senior Open	Germany	350,000	(Wales) Phillip Price (1)	
30 Jul	The Senior Open Championship	Wales	£1,500,000	(Germany) Bernhard Langer (6)	Senior major championship
6 Aug	Scottish Senior Open	Scotland	£250,000	(England) Paul Broadhurst (3)	
27 Aug	Willow Senior Golf Classic	England	£360,000	(England) Barry Lane (6)	
3 Sep	Travis Perkins Masters	England	£360,000	(England) Philip Golding (4)	
10 Sep	Senior Italian Open	Italy	350,000	(United States) Clark Dennis (1)	
30 Sep	Paris Legends Championship	France	350,000	(England) Paul Broadhurst (4)	
8 Oct	Dutch Senior Masters	Netherlands	180,000	(United States) Clark Dennis (2)	New tournament
22 Oct	Farmfoods European Senior Masters	England	200,000	(Wales) Stephen Dodd (2)	New tournament
10 Dec	MCB Tour Championship	Mauritius	450,000	(Thailand) Thaworn Wiratchant (1)	Tour Championship

== Order of Merit ==
The Order of Merit was based on prize money won during the season, calculated in Euros.

Position	Player	Prize money (€)
1	(United States) Clark Dennis	222,055
2	(South Africa) Chris Williams	190,716
3	(Australia) Peter Fowler	175,752
4	(England) Philip Golding	167,795
5	(Sweden) Magnus Persson Atlevi	160,558

== Awards ==
Award	Winner	Ref.
Rookie of the Year	(United States) Clark Dennis	
