= Clarence Rose =

American golfer (born 1957)

Personal information
- Nationality: United States
- Born: December 8, 1957 (age 68) Goldsboro, North Carolina, U.S.
- Height: 5 ft 8 in (1.73 m)
- Weight: 175 lb (79 kg; 12.5 st)

Career
- Sport: Golf
- College: Mount Olive College, Clemson University
- Turned professional: 1981
- Former tours: PGA Tour; Champions Tour
- Professional wins: 3

Number of wins by tour
- PGA Tour: 1
- Korn Ferry Tour: 1

Best results in major championships
- Masters Tournament: T43: 1997
- PGA Championship: T53: 1986, 1989
- U.S. Open: T40: 1988
- The Open Championship: DNP

Clarence Rose (born December 8, 1957) is an American professional golfer who has played on the PGA Tour, Nationwide Tour, and Champions Tour.

== Early life and amateur career ==
Rose was born December 8, 1957, in Goldsboro, North Carolina. He attended and played golf at Mount Olive College and then Clemson University. He was an All-American at both Mount Olive and Clemson.

== Professional career ==
In 1981, Rose turned pro. He was successful at Spring 1981 PGA Tour Qualifying School.

Rose has more than two dozen top-10 finishes including one win and six runners-up in official PGA Tour events. He captured his first victory at the 1996 Sprint International in his 16th year on the Tour. His best finish in a major championship was T40 at the 1988 U.S. Open.

After turning 50, Rose played several events on the Champions Tour.

== Personal life ==
Rose lives in Goldsboro, North Carolina, his lifelong hometown.

In 1990, Rose took a hiatus from competitive golf after learning his 18-month-old son, Clark, had testicular cancer. He established the Clarence Rose Foundation to help needy children in Wayne County, North Carolina.

== Amateur wins ==
- 1979 North Carolina Amateur

== Professional wins (3) ==
=== PGA Tour wins (1) ===
No.	Date	Tournament	Winning score	Margin of victory	Runner-up
1	Aug 18, 1996	Sprint International	31 pts (6-3-12-10=31)	Playoff	(United States) Brad Faxon

PGA Tour playoff record (1–1)

No.	Year	Tournament	Opponent	Result
1	1988	GTE Byron Nelson Classic	(United States) Bruce Lietzke	Lost to birdie on first extra hole
2	1996	Sprint International	(United States) Brad Faxon	Won with eagle on third extra hole

=== Nike Tour wins (1) ===
No.	Date	Tournament	Winning score	Margin of victory	Runners-up
1	Apr 2, 1995	Nike Pensacola Classic	−12 (64-71-66=201) (Note: Shortened to 54 holes due to weather.)	3 strokes	(United States) Bill Buttner, (United States) Joe Cioe, (United States) Hicks Malonson

=== Other wins (1) ===
- 1997 JCPenney Classic (with Amy Fruhwirth)

== Results in major championships ==
Tournament	1982	1983	1984	1985	1986	1987	1988	1989
Masters Tournament								
U.S. Open	T49	CUT					T40	T59
PGA Championship		CUT	CUT	CUT	T53	CUT	CUT	T53

Tournament	1990	1991	1992	1993	1994	1995	1996	1997	1998
Masters Tournament								T43	
U.S. Open								T58	CUT
PGA Championship								CUT	

Note: Rose never played in The Open Championship

Did not play

CUT = missed the half-way cut
"T" indicates a tie for a place

== See also ==
- Spring 1981 PGA Tour Qualifying School graduates
- 1995 PGA Tour Qualifying School graduates
- 1998 PGA Tour Qualifying School graduates
