= El Paso Open =

Ben Hogan El Paso Open
Tournament information
- Location: El Paso, Texas
- Established: 1990
- Course: Coronado Country Club
- Par: 70
- Tour: Ben Hogan Tour
- Format: Stroke play
- Prize fund: US$125,000
- Month played: September
- Final year: 1991

Tournament record score
- Aggregate: 202 Rick Todd (1991)
- To par: −8 as above

Final champion
- (Canada) Rick Todd
- Location in the United States Location in Texas

The El Paso Open was a golf tournament on the Ben Hogan Tour. It ran from 1990 to 1991. It was played at Coronado Country Club in El Paso, Texas.

In 1991 the winner earned $25,000.

== Winners ==
Year	Winner	Score	To par	Margin of victory	Runner-up
Ben Hogan El Paso Open
1991	(Canada) Rick Todd	202	−8	1 stroke	(United States) Tom Eubank
1990	(United States) Mike Springer	204	−6	2 strokes	(United States) Bob Friend
