= Ricky Smallridge =

American professional golfer

Personal information
- Full name: Ricky M. Smallridge
- Nationality: United States
- Born: December 10, 1958 (age 67)
- Height: 6 ft 0 in (1.83 m)
- Weight: 130 lb (59 kg; 9.3 st)

Career
- Sport: Golf
- College: Auburn University
- Status: Professional
- Former tours: Ben Hogan Tour; Hooters Jordan Tour
- Professional wins: 5

Number of wins by tour
- Korn Ferry Tour: 2
- Other: 3

Ricky M. Smallridge (born December 10, 1958) is an American professional golfer.

== Early life and amateur career ==
Smallridge played college golf at Auburn University, winning four events and earning All-American honors in 1979.

== Professional career ==
Smallridge worked as a club pro and also played mini-tours before joining the Ben Hogan Tour in 1990. He played that tour from 1990 to 1996, winning twice: the 1990 Ben Hogan Boise Open and the 1991 Ben Hogan Elizabethtown Open. He also won the Alabama Open in 1989 and 1991.

== Professional wins (5) ==
=== Ben Hogan Tour wins (2) ===
No.	Date	Tournament	Winning score	Margin of victory	Runner(s)-up
1	Sep 23, 1990	Ben Hogan Boise Open	−14 (64-67-68=199)	3 strokes	(United States) David Hobby, (United States) Robert Thompson, (United States) Greg Whisman
2	May 26, 1991	Ben Hogan Elizabethtown Open	−12 (70-69-62=201)	5 strokes	(United States) Jerry Foltz

=== Hooters Jordan Tour wins (1) ===
No.	Date	Tournament	Winning score	Margin of victory	Runners-up
1	Jun 12, 1994	Hooters Classic	−19 (68-67-70-64=269)	2 strokes	(United States) Marion Dantzler, (United States) Michael Foster

=== Other wins (2) ===
- 1989 Alabama Open
- 1991 Alabama Open
