= 1991 Ben Hogan Tour =

Golf tour season

1991 Ben Hogan Tour season
- Duration: February 1, 1991 – October 20, 1991
- Number of official events: 30
- Most wins: (United States) Tom Lehman (3)
- Money list: (United States) Tom Lehman
- Player of the Year: (United States) Tom Lehman

The 1991 Ben Hogan Tour was the second season of the Ben Hogan Tour, the official development tour to the PGA Tour.

== Schedule ==
The following table lists official events during the 1991 season.

Date	Tournament	Location	Purse (US$)	Winner (Note: The number in parentheses after each winner's name is the number of Ben Hogan Tour events they had won up to and including that tournament. This information is only shown for Ben Hogan Tour members. It is rare for someone to accumulate many wins on the Ben Hogan Tour as success at this level usually leads to promotion to the PGA Tour.)	Notes
Feb 3	Ben Hogan Bakersfield Open	California	100,000	(United States) Olin Browne (1)	
Feb 10	Ben Hogan Yuma Open	Arizona	100,000	(United States) P. H. Horgan III (1)	
Mar 3	Ben Hogan South Texas Open	Texas	100,000	(United States) Roger Salazar (1)	
Mar 10	Ben Hogan Shreveport Open	Louisiana	125,000	(United States) Jeff Coston (1)	New tournament
Mar 17	Ben Hogan Gulf Coast Classic	Mississippi	125,000	(United States) Tom Lehman (2)	
Mar 24	Ben Hogan Panama City Beach Classic	Florida	100,000	(United States) Bruce Zabriski (1)	
Mar 30	Ben Hogan Gateway Open	Florida	100,000	(United States) Gary McCord (1)	
Apr 7	Ben Hogan Lake City Classic	Florida	125,000	(United States) Don Reese (1)	
Apr 21	Ben Hogan Pensacola Open	Florida	100,000	(Trinidad and Tobago) Stephen Ames (1)	
Apr 28	Ben Hogan Macon Open	Georgia	100,000	(United States) P. H. Horgan III (2)	
May 5	Ben Hogan South Carolina Classic	South Carolina	125,000	(United States) Tom Lehman (3)	New tournament
May 19	Ben Hogan Knoxville Open	Tennessee	100,000	(United States) Frank Conner (1)	
May 26	Ben Hogan Elizabethtown Open	Kentucky	100,000	(United States) Ricky Smallridge (2)	
Jun 2	Ben Hogan Quicksilver Open	Pennsylvania	200,000	(United States) Lon Hinkle (1)	
Jun 9	Ben Hogan Cleveland Open	Ohio	125,000	(United States) Jeff Gallagher (1)	
Jun 23	Ben Hogan Fort Wayne Open	Indiana	100,000	(United States) Bob Friend (1)	
Jun 30	Ben Hogan New England Classic	Maine	100,000	(United States) Steve Haskins (1)	
Jul 7	Ben Hogan Connecticut Open	Connecticut	100,000	(United States) Mike Holland (1)	
Jul 21	Ben Hogan Hawkeye Open	Iowa	125,000	(United States) Olin Browne (2)	New tournament
Jul 28	Ben Hogan Wichita Charity Classic	Kansas	125,000	(United States) Eric Hoos (1)	
Aug 4	Ben Hogan Dakota Dunes Open	South Dakota	125,000	(Australia) Jeff Woodland (1)	
Aug 11	Ben Hogan Tulsa Open	Oklahoma	125,000	(United States) Frank Conner (2)	New tournament
Aug 18	Ben Hogan Greater Ozarks Open	Missouri	125,000	(United States) Rick Dalpos (1)	
Aug 25	Ben Hogan Texarkana Open	Arkansas	125,000	(Canada) Jerry Anderson (1)	
Sep 8	Ben Hogan Reno Open	Nevada	100,000	(United States) John Flannery (1)	
Sep 15	Ben Hogan Boise Open	Idaho	125,000	(United States) Russell Beiersdorf (1)	
Sep 22	Ben Hogan Utah Classic	Utah	100,000	(United States) Ted Tryba (2)	
Sep 29	Ben Hogan El Paso Open	Texas	125,000	(Canada) Rick Todd (1)	
Oct 13	Ben Hogan Santa Rosa Open	California	100,000	(United States) Tom Lehman (4)	
Oct 20	Ben Hogan Tri-Cities Open	Washington	125,000	(United States) Kelly Gibson (1)	New tournament

== Money list ==
The money list was based on prize money won during the season, calculated in U.S. dollars. The top five players on the money list earned status to play on the 1992 PGA Tour.

Position	Player	Prize money ($)
1	(United States) Tom Lehman	141,934
2	(United States) Olin Browne	106,406
3	(United States) P. H. Horgan III	84,432
4	(Canada) Jerry Anderson	77,919
5	(United States) Frank Conner	77,450

== Awards ==
Award	Winner	Ref.
Player of the Year (Jack Nicklaus Trophy)	(United States) Tom Lehman	
