= Chris Anderson (golfer, born 1961) =

American golfer (1961–2023)

Personal information
- Nationality: United States
- Born: October 2, 1961 Wilmington, Delaware, U.S.
- Died: April 29, 2023 (aged 61) Delaware, U.S.

Career
- Sport: Golf
- College: University of Virginia
- Turned professional: 1984 (regained amateur status 2004)
- Former tours: Nike Tour; Canadian Tour; Southern Africa Tour

Best results in major championships
- Masters Tournament: DNP
- PGA Championship: CUT: 1996
- U.S. Open: DNP
- The Open Championship: DNP

Achievements and awards
- Delaware Athlete of the Year: 1983
- Delaware Sports Museum and Hall of Fame: 2023

Christopher T. Anderson (October 2, 1961 – April 29, 2023) was an American professional golfer. He is considered one of the best golfers in Delaware history, winning the Delaware Open a record seven times. He competed in five PGA Tour events in his career and was inducted into the Delaware Sports Museum and Hall of Fame in 2023.

== Biography ==
Anderson was born in 1961 in Wilmington, Delaware, where he grew up. He was the son of Major League Baseball player Harry Anderson, and both his mother, Gail, and brother, Todd, also won state golf championships. Anderson started competing in golf at around age eight. In 1977, at the age of 15, he won the Delaware Junior Championship over Eric Thomas in what The News Journal called a "37-hole marathon". He was a member of the Wilmington Country Club.

Anderson attended Wilmington Friends School and later graduated from Alexis I. duPont High School in 1979. Afterwards, he began attending the University of Virginia, competing for the Virginia Cavaliers men's golf team. Outside of Virginia, he competed at the Delaware Amateur in 1980, placing fifth, and then placed third at the same competition in 1981. He won the Philadelphia Amateur title in 1982 and defended his title in 1983, becoming the only person from Delaware to win the event. The same year, he won the Delaware Open, only the sixth amateur to win the competition. He also competed at the 1983 U.S. Amateur and was one of 64 to advance to match play. He received the 1983 Annual Award from the Delaware State Golf Association and was named that year's Delaware Athlete of the Year by the Delaware Sportswriters and Broadcasters Association. He was the first amateur golfer to ever receive the Athlete of the Year award.

Anderson was team captain at the University of Virginia, and turned professional in 1984, becoming club pro for Bidermann GC, and later becoming a member of Delcastle GC. In 1985, he won his second Delaware Open title, being only the second person to accomplish the feat. He won the Delaware Open again in 1988, a fourth title in 1990, and his fifth in 1992. He competed on the Canadian and South African PGA tours in 1988, and in 1991, he was the winner of the PGA of America National Match Play Championship. He competed in the Nike Tour in 1992, 1996, and 1997, and in 1992, won the Variety Club Tournament of the Champions of Philadelphia and placed second at the Fort Wayne Open. In 1996, Anderson competed at the PGA Championship. In his career, he competed in five PGA Tour events.

In 2001, Anderson retired from professional play and regained his amateur status in 2004. He won the Delaware Open in 2003 and 2004. With his victory through a sudden-death playoff in 2004, he became the winningest Delaware Open participant all-time, with seven titles. The following year, he won the Delaware Amateur championship. He finished his career as one of Delaware's most successful golfers, and Golf Digest ranked him one of the state's three greatest golfers. Anderson was active in the community, serving on the board for the organization First Tee – Delaware, and being a supporter of the Special Olympics. He had a daughter. Anderson died on April 29, 2023, at the age of 61. He was posthumously inducted into the Delaware Sports Museum and Hall of Fame later that year.
