= Bob Friend (golfer) =

American professional golfer (born 1963)

Personal information
- Nationality: United States
- Born: December 5, 1963 (age 62) Pittsburgh, Pennsylvania, U.S.
- Height: 5 ft 8 in (1.73 m)
- Weight: 180 lb (82 kg; 13 st)

Career
- Sport: Golf
- College: Louisiana State University
- Turned professional: 1987
- Former tours: PGA Tour; Nationwide Tour; Champions Tour
- Professional wins: 2

Number of wins by tour
- Korn Ferry Tour: 1
- Other: 1

Best results in major championships
- Masters Tournament: DNP
- PGA Championship: CUT: 1999
- U.S. Open: CUT: 1984, 1988, 1994, 1999
- The Open Championship: DNP

Bob Friend (born December 5, 1963) is an American professional golfer who played on the PGA Tour and the Nationwide Tour.

== Early life ==
Friend's father is the former MLB pitcher Bob Friend (1930–2019).

== Professional career ==
In 1990, Friend joined the Ben Hogan Tour. He recorded five top-10 finishes including a second-place finish at the Ben Hogan El Paso Open. The following year, in 1991, he won the Ben Hogan Fort Wayne Open. Late in the year he attended 1991 PGA Tour Qualifying School and earned his PGA Tour card.

In 1992, his rookie year on tour, he didn't play well enough to retain full-time status but his 137th-place finish gave him partial status. In 1993, Friend split time between the PGA Tour and its developmental tour. His main highlights of the year coming on the Nike Tour where he recorded a second-place finish and a joint third-place finish. In 1994, Friend played full-time on the Nationwide Tour where he recorded five top-10 finishes and two third-place finishes. He struggled in 1995 but recorded two top-10 finishes. He didn't play on tour in 1996 and returned to the Nike Tour in 1997 where he recorded three top-10 finishes.

He returned to the PGA Tour in 1998, earning his card through qualifying school. He played very well during his second stint on Tour, finishing 57th on the money list. He lost in a playoff to Billy Andrade at the Bell Canadian Open and recorded three top-10 finishes. He didn't play as well the following year and had to go through qualifying school to retain his card. In 2000, his final year on the PGA Tour, he struggled and returned to the Nationwide Tour the following year where he would play until 2003.

== Personal life ==
Friend is father of three children. He currently works as a real estate agent for Howard Hanna Real Estate in the Fox Chapel area.

== Amateur wins ==
- 1984 Western Pennsylvania Amateur
- 1985 Western Pennsylvania Amateur, Pennsylvania Amateur
- 1986 SEC Championship, Monroe Invitational, Northeast Amateur, Mid-Atlantic Amateur

== Professional wins (2) ==
=== Nike Tour wins (1) ===
No.	Date	Tournament	Winning score	Margin of victory	Runners-up
1	Jun 23, 1991	Ben Hogan Fort Wayne Open	−12 (71-66-64=201)	Playoff	(Canada) Jerry Anderson, (United States) Dennis Trixler

Nike Tour playoff record (1–1)

No.	Year	Tournament	Opponent(s)	Result
1	1991	Ben Hogan Fort Wayne Open	(Canada) Jerry Anderson, (United States) Dennis Trixler	Won with birdie on fourth extra hole
2	1993	Nike Mississippi Gulf Coast Classic	(United States) Jim Furyk	Lost to birdie on first extra hole

=== Other wins (1) ===
- 1998 Panama Open

== Playoff record ==
PGA Tour playoff record (0–1)

No.	Year	Tournament	Opponent	Result
1	1998	Bell Canadian Open	(United States) Billy Andrade	Lost to par on first extra hole

== See also ==
- 1991 PGA Tour Qualifying School graduates
- 1997 PGA Tour Qualifying School graduates
- 1999 PGA Tour Qualifying School graduates
