= Tom Garner =

American golfer

Personal information
- Nationality: United States
- Born: July 18, 1961 (age 65) Fort Lauderdale, Florida, U.S.
- Height: 5 ft 10 in (1.78 m)
- Weight: 175 lb (79 kg; 12.5 st)

Career
- Sport: Golf
- College: University of Alabama
- Turned professional: 1984
- Former tours: PGA Tour; Nationwide Tour
- Professional wins: 3

Number of wins by tour
- Korn Ferry Tour: 2
- Other: 1

Best results in major championships
- Masters Tournament: DNP
- PGA Championship: DNP
- U.S. Open: CUT: 1990, 1994
- The Open Championship: DNP

Tom Garner (born July 18, 1961) is an American professional golfer who played on the PGA Tour and its developmental tour.

== Career ==
Late in the year Garner had success at 1986 PGA Tour Qualifying School. In 1987, he struggled in his rookie year on tour and was unable to retain his card. In 1990, Garner joined the Ben Hogan Tour, the PGA Tour's developmental tour. That year, he won the Ben Hogan Central New York Classic. The following year he finished in a tie for second twice while recording four top-5 finishes. In 1992, he picked up his second victory on the Ben Hogan Tour at the Ben Hogan Bakersfield Open.

In 1993, he had success at PGA Tour Qualifying School and rejoined the PGA Tour. However, he struggled and returned to the developmental tour where he would play until 1998.

In 1997, Garner started work as an instructor at the Arnold Palmer Golf Academy at Bay Hill Club and Lodge in Orlando, Florida. He continues to work there.

== Professional wins (3) ==
=== Ben Hogan Tour wins (2) ===
No.	Date	Tournament	Winning score	Margin of victory	Runner(s)-up
1	Jul 1, 1990	Ben Hogan Central New York Classic	−9 (69-70-68=207)	1 stroke	(United States) Ed Humenik, (United States) Andy Morse, (United States) Brian Watts
2	Oct 11, 1992	Ben Hogan Bakersfield Open	−11 (65-71-69=205)	2 strokes	(United States) Steve Lowery

=== Other wins (1) ===
- 1997 North Florida PGA Section Championship

== Results in major championships ==
Tournament	1990	1991	1992	1993	1994
U.S. Open	CUT				CUT

Did not play

CUT = missed the half-way cut
Note: Garner only played in the U.S. Open.

== See also ==
- 1986 PGA Tour Qualifying School graduates
- 1993 PGA Tour Qualifying School graduates
