= Dick Mast =

American professional golfer (born 1951)

Personal information
- Full name: Richard Mast
- Nationality: United States
- Born: March 23, 1951 (age 75) Bluffton, Ohio, U.S.

Career
- Sport: Golf
- College: St. Petersburg Junior College
- Turned professional: 1972
- Current tour: European Seniors Tour
- Former tours: PGA Tour; Nationwide Tour; Champions Tour
- Professional wins: 4

Number of wins by tour
- Korn Ferry Tour: 4

Best results in major championships
- Masters Tournament: DNP
- PGA Championship: 71st: 1988
- U.S. Open: T50: 1988
- The Open Championship: DNP

Richard Mast (born March 23, 1951) is an American professional golfer who has played on the PGA Tour, Nationwide Tour, and Champions Tour.

== Career ==
Mast was born in Bluffton, Ohio. He graduated from St. Petersburg Junior College in 1971 with a degree in business.

In 1972, Mast turned pro. He played on the PGA Tour intermittently in the 1970s and early 1980s. He finished fourth in the 1985 qualifying school to earn his Tour card for 1986. He kept his card through the 1989 season when he finished 173rd on the money list and lost his card. The biggest impression he made in the majors was at the U.S. Open in 1988, where he was only one stroke off the lead after the first round; he went on to finish in a tie for 50th place.

In 1990, Mast played the inaugural season of the Ben Hogan Tour, the PGA tour's developmental tour, and won three times and finished third on the money list to regain his PGA Tour card for the following season. Mast's best finish on the PGA Tour was second at the 1992 Greater Milwaukee Open. He played almost exclusively on the PGA Tour through 1994 when he again lost his card by finishing 131st on the money list. He played both the regular tour and developmental tour from 1995 to 2001 picking up a win on the developmental tour in 1999.

After turning 50 in 2001, Mast started playing on the Senior PGA TOUR and placed eighth in the 2001 qualifying school to earn full exempt status for 2002. He played full-time on the Champions Tour through 2007. His best finish on the Champions Tour was third at the 2006 Senior British Open, T-3 at the 2002 Turtle Bay Championship, and tied for third at the 2012 Senior British Open. In January 2012, Mast won the Qualifying School for the European Seniors Tour.

== Professional wins (4) ==
=== Nike Tour wins (4) ===
| No. | Date | Tournament | Winning score | Margin of victory | Runner(s)-up |
|---|---|---|---|---|---|
| 1 | Mar 18, 1990 | Ben Hogan Gulf Coast Classic | −7 (70-67=137) (Note: Shortened to 36 holes due to weather.) | Playoff | (United States) Rick Pearson |
| 2 | Apr 15, 1990 | Ben Hogan Pensacola Open | −11 (68-71-66=205) | 1 stroke | (United States) Ken Mattiace, (United States) Dennis Trixler |
| 3 | Jun 17, 1990 | Ben Hogan Fort Wayne Open | −16 (64-64-69=197) | 3 strokes | (United States) Jim McGovern |
| 4 | Oct 10, 1999 | Nike New Mexico Classic | −13 (73-64-67-63=267) | 3 strokes | (United States) Joel Edwards |

Nike Tour playoff record (1–0)

| No. | Year | Tournament | Opponent | Result |
|---|---|---|---|---|
| 1 | 1990 | Ben Hogan Gulf Coast Classic | (United States) Rick Pearson | Won with par on third extra hole |

== Results in major championships ==
| Tournament | 1985 | 1986 | 1987 | 1988 | 1990 | 1991 | 1992 | 1993 | 1994 | 1995 | 1996 | 1997 | 1998 |
|---|---|---|---|---|---|---|---|---|---|---|---|---|---|
| U.S. Open | T52 | 65 | | T50 | | | | CUT | | | | T77 | CUT |
| PGA Championship | | | | 71 | | | | CUT | | | | | |

Did not play

CUT = missed the half-way cut
"T" indicates a tie for a place
Note: Mast never played in the Masters Tournament or The Open Championship.

== See also ==
- 1973 PGA Tour Qualifying School graduates
- Fall 1976 PGA Tour Qualifying School graduates
- Fall 1978 PGA Tour Qualifying School graduates
- 1985 PGA Tour Qualifying School graduates
- 1991 PGA Tour Qualifying School graduates
- 1990 Ben Hogan Tour graduates
- List of golfers with most Web.com Tour wins
