= Sonny Skinner =

American professional golfer (born 1960)

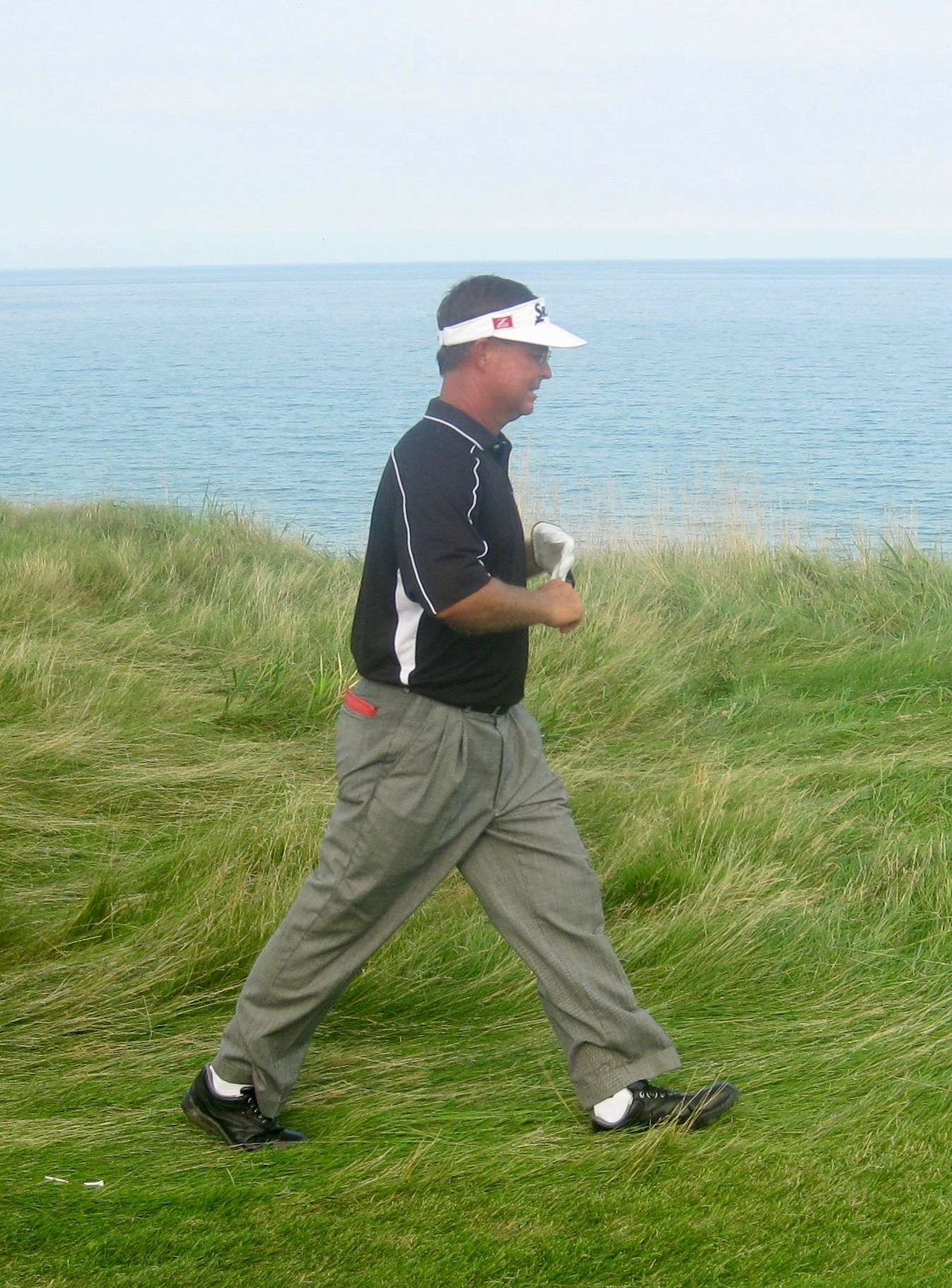
- Skinner at the 2010 PGA Championship

Personal information
- Nationality: United States
- Born: August 18, 1960 (age 66) Portsmouth, Virginia, U.S.
- Height: 5 ft 9 in (1.75 m)
- Weight: 170 lb (77 kg; 12 st)

Career
- Sport: Golf
- College: Abraham Baldwin Agricultural College; Shorter College
- Turned professional: 1982
- Former tours: PGA Tour; Nationwide Tour; Champions Tour
- Professional wins: 4

Number of wins by tour
- Korn Ferry Tour: 2
- Other: 2

Best results in major championships
- Masters Tournament: DNP
- PGA Championship: CUT: 2008, 2010, 2013, 2021
- U.S. Open: DNP
- The Open Championship: DNP

Achievements and awards
- PGA Professional of the Year: 2008
- Senior PGA Professional of the Year: 2010

Sonny Skinner (born August 18, 1960) is an American professional golfer who played on the PGA Tour and Champions Tour.

== Early life ==
Skinner was born in Portsmouth, Virginia.

== Professional career ==
In 1982, Skinner turned professional. In 1990, Skinner joined the PGA Tour after going through qualifying school. He played on the Ben Hogan Tour in 1991 after a poor performance in his rookie year on the PGA Tour. He went through qualifying school again in 1991 and returned to the PGA Tour in 1992. He returned to the Nationwide Tour in 1993 where he won the first event he entered, the Nike Shreveport Open. He picked up his second win on Tour in 1994 at the Nike Dominion Open. He played on the Nationwide Tour until earning his PGA Tour card through qualifying school for the third time in 1996. In the 1997 Buick Open, he tied the course record at the Warwick Hills Golf Course with a 62 but Billy Mayfair shot a 61 in 2001 to break the record. He failed to retain his card in 1997 but went through qualifying school for a fourth time to earn his card for 1998. He returned to the Nationwide Tour in 1999 where he would play full-time until 2004. He played on the Nationwide Tour part-time until 2010.

Skinner joined the Champions Tour in 2010 once he turned 50.

Skinner was named the PGA Professional of the Year in 2008 and the Senior PGA Professional of the Year in 2010, becoming the first person to win both awards. He is a PGA teaching professional at the River Pointe Golf Club in Albany, Georgia.

== Awards and honors ==
- Skinner has been inducted into the Abraham Baldwin Agricultural College Athletic Hall of Fame
- He has been inducted into the Shorter College Athletic Hall of Fame
- Skinner has been inducted into the Georgia Golf Hall of Fame
- In 2008, he was named the PGA Professional of the Year
- In 2010, Skinner was named the Senior PGA Professional of the Year

== Professional wins (4) ==
=== Nike Tour wins (2) ===
| No. | Date | Tournament | Winning score | Margin of victory | Runner-up |
|---|---|---|---|---|---|
| 1 | Apr 18, 1993 | Nike Shreveport Open | −10 (74-70-69-65=278) | 1 stroke | (United States) Bob May |
| 2 | Jun 19, 1994 | Nike Dominion Open | −17 (70-65-67-69=271) | Playoff | (United States) Jim Carter |

Nike Tour playoff record (1–1)

| No. | Year | Tournament | Opponent(s) | Result |
|---|---|---|---|---|
| 1 | 1993 | Nike Bakersfield Open | (United States) Clark Dennis, (United States) Jim Furyk | Dennis won with birdie on first extra hole |
| 2 | 1994 | Nike Dominion Open | (United States) Jim Carter | Won with birdie on first extra hole |

=== Other wins (2) ===
- 2009 Georgia PGA Championship
- 2012 Georgia PGA Championship

== Results in major championships ==
| Tournament | 2008 | 2009 |
|---|---|---|
| PGA Championship | CUT | |

| Tournament | 2010 | 2011 | 2012 | 2013 | 2014 | 2015 | 2016 | 2017 | 2018 | 2019 |
|---|---|---|---|---|---|---|---|---|---|---|
| PGA Championship | CUT | | | CUT | | | | | | |

| Tournament | 2020 | 2021 |
|---|---|---|
| PGA Championship | | CUT |

Did not play

CUT = missed the half-way cut
Note: Skinner only played in the PGA Championship.

== U.S. national team appearances ==
- PGA Cup: 2009 (winners), 2011 (winners)

== See also ==
- 1989 PGA Tour Qualifying School graduates
- 1991 PGA Tour Qualifying School graduates
- 1996 PGA Tour Qualifying School graduates
- 1997 PGA Tour Qualifying School graduates
