= Jerry Foltz =

American professional golfer (born 1962)

Personal information
- Nationality: United States
- Born: August 14, 1962 (age 64) Las Vegas, Nevada, U.S.
- Height: 6 ft 1 in (1.85 m)
- Weight: 200 lb (91 kg; 14 st)

Career
- Sport: Golf
- College: University of Arizona
- Turned professional: 1986
- Former tour: Nationwide Tour
- Professional wins: 2

Number of wins by tour
- Korn Ferry Tour: 1
- Other: 1

Best results in major championships
- Masters Tournament: DNP
- PGA Championship: DNP
- U.S. Open: CUT: 1991
- The Open Championship: DNP

Jerry Foltz (born August 14, 1962) is an American former professional golfer and current commentator for the LIV Golf Invitational Series. He was formerly a long-time commentator for the Golf Channel.

== Early life and amateur career ==
In 1962, Foltz was born in Las Vegas, Nevada. He played his college golf for the University of Arizona and was an All-Pac-10 selection in 1984. In 1989, he won the Arizona Amateur.

== Professional career ==
In 1990, Foltz turned professional. Three days after turning professional, Foltz sustained a serious back injury in an auto accident involving a drunk driver. Foltz was determined to overcome the injury and went on to success on the Nike Tour. He had one victory on the Nike Tour in 1995. He has seven career holes-in-one.

=== Broadcasting career ===
His broadcasting career began as he was still committed to his playing career. Foltz worked as a broadcaster for the Golf Channel for a number of years.

In June 2022, it was confirmed that Foltz had left the Golf Channel to join the commentary team at the LIV Golf Invitational Series.

== Personal life ==
Foltz and his wife Jane have one son, Jackson; they reside in Orlando, Florida.

== Professional wins (2) ==
=== Nike Tour wins (1) ===
No.	Date	Tournament	Winning score	Margin of victory	Runners-up
1	May 7, 1995	Nike South Carolina Classic	−9 (71-70-71-67=279)	1 stroke	(United States) Morris Hatalsky, (United States) Tim Simpson, (United States) Robert Wrenn

=== Other wins (1) ===
- 1994 Newport Classic

== Results in major championships ==
Tournament	1991
U.S. Open	CUT

Did not play

CUT = missed the halfway cut
Note: Foltz only played in the U.S. Open.
