= Jim McGovern (golfer) =

American professional golfer (born 1965)

Personal information
- Full name: James David McGovern
- Nationality: United States
- Born: February 5, 1965 (age 61) Teaneck, New Jersey, U.S.
- Height: 6 ft 1 in (1.85 m)
- Weight: 200 lb (91 kg; 14 st)
- Spouse: Lauren McGovern
- Children: Melanie, Emily, Elizabeth, Sean

Career
- Sport: Golf
- College: University of Arkansas; Old Dominion University
- Turned professional: 1988
- Former tours: PGA Tour; Nationwide Tour
- Professional wins: 9
- Highest ranking: 98 (February 4, 1996)

Number of wins by tour
- PGA Tour: 1
- Korn Ferry Tour: 3
- Other: 5

Best results in major championships
- Masters Tournament: T5: 1994
- PGA Championship: T22: 1993
- U.S. Open: T13: 1994
- The Open Championship: CUT: 1993, 1994

James David McGovern (born February 5, 1965) is an American professional golfer who has played on the PGA Tour and the Nationwide Tour.

== Early life ==
McGovern was born in Teaneck, New Jersey. He grew up in Oradell, New Jersey in a house adjoining the Hackensack Golf Club. McGovern attended Bergen Catholic High School and was a star football player there. However, a coach introduced him to golf during his junior year.

== Amateur career ==
McGovern initially attended the University of Arkansas as a non-scholarship member of its golf team. He transferred after two years to Old Dominion University in Norfolk, Virginia and was a member of that school's golf team. He turned pro in 1988 and joined the PGA Tour in 1991.

== Professional career ==
McGovern was a member of the PGA Tour from 1991–1998. His career year was 1993 when he won once, had two other top-10 finishes, earned $587,495 and finished 27th on the money list. His best finish in a major was T5 at the 1994 Masters Tournament. He had 14 career top-10 finishes in 386 PGA Tour events.

McGovern finished 19th in qualifying school and earned his PGA Tour card for 2008; he made the cut in 11 of 26 events. In 2009, he was back on the Nationwide Tour.

On January 1, 2011, McGovern became the head golf professional at White Beeches Golf & Country Club in Haworth, New Jersey, 20 miles from midtown Manhattan. He is one of the few PGA Professionals who was also a PGA Tour winner.

On May 17, 2011, McGovern earned medalist honors at the local U.S. Open qualifier. His 4-under 68 at Ballyowen Golf Club gave him medalist honors by two strokes and also secured for him one of five spots available for the U.S. Open sectional qualifier at Canoe Brook on June 6. McGovern earned a spot in the 2014 PGA Championship through his finish at the PGA Professional National Championship after having to qualify in a playoff for one of the twenty positions. He occasionally continues to compete at senior major events and those sanctioned through the New Jersey section of the PGA of America.

== Personal life ==
McGovern lives in Oradell, New Jersey. His brother, Rob McGovern, played linebacker in the NFL.

== Amateur wins ==
- 1987 Virginia State Intercollegiate Championship
- 1988 Metropolitan Amateur

== Professional wins (9) ==
=== PGA Tour wins (1) ===
No.	Date	Tournament	Winning score	Margin of victory	Runner-up
1	May 2, 1993	Shell Houston Open	−17 (67-64-68=199) (Note: Shortened to 54 holes due to weather.)	Playoff	(United States) John Huston

PGA Tour playoff record (1–0)

No.	Year	Tournament	Opponent	Result
1	1993	Shell Houston Open	(United States) John Huston	Won with birdie on second extra hole

=== Ben Hogan Tour wins (3) ===
No.	Date	Tournament	Winning score	Margin of victory	Runner-up
1	Apr 1, 1990	Ben Hogan Lake City Classic	−14 (69-70-63=202)	Playoff	(United States) David Toms
2	Jul 8, 1990	Ben Hogan New Haven Open	−9 (71-65-65=201)	3 strokes	(United States) Tray Tyner
3	Sep 2, 1990	Ben Hogan Texarkana Open	−16 (67-66-67=200)	2 strokes	(United States) John Daly

Ben Hogan Tour playoff record (1–0)

No.	Year	Tournament	Opponent	Result
1	1990	Ben Hogan Lake City Classic	(United States) David Toms	Won with par on fourth extra hole

=== Other wins (5) ===
- 1987 Metropolitan Open (as an amateur)
- 1994 Diners Club Matches (with Jeff Maggert)
- 2015 New Jersey Senior Open
- 2016 New Jersey Senior Open, Metropolitan Senior Open

== Results in major championships ==
Tournament	1989	1990	1991	1992	1993	1994	1995	1996	1997	1998	1999
Masters Tournament						T5	CUT				
U.S. Open	CUT		CUT	CUT		T13	T45		CUT		CUT
The Open Championship					CUT	CUT					
PGA Championship					T22	CUT	CUT	CUT			

Tournament	2000	2001	2002	2003	2004	2005	2006	2007	2008	2009
Masters Tournament										
U.S. Open	CUT	78	CUT							
The Open Championship										
PGA Championship										

Tournament	2010	2011	2012	2013	2014
Masters Tournament					
U.S. Open					
The Open Championship					
PGA Championship					CUT

Top 10
Did not play

CUT = missed the half-way cut
"T" = tied

== See also ==
- 1990 Ben Hogan Tour graduates
- 1991 PGA Tour Qualifying School graduates
- 1996 PGA Tour Qualifying School graduates
- 1997 PGA Tour Qualifying School graduates
- 2007 PGA Tour Qualifying School graduates
