= 1999 WGC-Andersen Consulting Match Play Championship =

Golf tournament

Coordinates: 33°05′32.16″N 117°16′01.33″W

Tournament information
- Dates: February 24–28, 1999
- Location: Carlsbad, California
- Course(s): La Costa Resort and Spa
- Tour(s): PGA Tour; European Tour

Statistics
- Par: 72
- Length: 7,022
- Field: 64 players
- Prize fund: $5,000,000
- Winner's share: $1,000,000

Champion
- (United States) Jeff Maggert
- def. Andrew Magee after 38 holes

The 1999 WGC-Andersen Consulting Match Play Championship was a golf tournament that was played from February 24–28, 1999 at La Costa Resort and Spa in Carlsbad, California. It was the first WGC-Andersen Consulting Match Play Championship and the first of three World Golf Championships events held in 1999.

Jeff Maggert won his first World Golf Championships event at the match-play, by defeating Andrew Magee on the 38th hole in the 36 hole final that went extra holes.

== Brackets ==
The Championship was a single elimination match play event. The field consisted of the top 64 players available from the Official World Golf Ranking as of the February 14 ranking, seeded according to those rankings.

Jumbo Osaki (ranked #13) chose not to play and was replaced by Nick Faldo (#65).

=== Bobby Jones bracket ===
First round February 24
1	(United States) Tiger Woods	4&3
16	(England) Nick Faldo
8	(United States) Tom Watson
9	(United States) Bob Tway	6&4
5	(United States) Payne Stewart
12	(United States) Stewart Cink	3&2
4	(Sweden) Jesper Parnevik
13	(Australia) Craig Parry	1up
6	(United States) Jeff Maggert	2up
11	(United States) Fred Funk
3	(Zimbabwe) Nick Price	4&3
14	(Philippines) Frankie Miñoza
7	(Germany) Bernhard Langer	4&2
10	(United States) Brad Faxon
2	(Fiji) Vijay Singh	5&3
15	(United States) Rocco Mediate

Second round February 25
1	(United States) Tiger Woods	1up
9	(United States) Bob Tway
12	(Australia) Craig Parry
13	(United States) Stewart Cink	3&2
6	(United States) Jeff Maggert	1up
3	(Zimbabwe) Nick Price
7	(Germany) Bernhard Langer	2&1
2	(Fiji) Vijay Singh

Third round February 26
1	(United States) Tiger Woods	2&1
13	(United States) Stewart Cink
6	(United States) Jeff Maggert	1up
7	(Germany) Bernhard Langer

Fourth round February 27
1	(United States) Tiger Woods
6	(United States) Jeff Maggert	2&1

=== Ben Hogan bracket ===
First round February 24
1	(United States) Davis Love III
16	(United States) Steve Pate	1up
8	(United States) Jeff Sluman
9	(United States) Brandt Jobe	3&2
5	(United States) Scott Hoch	3&2
12	(Wales) Ian Woosnam
4	(United States) Fred Couples	2up
13	(United States) Dudley Hart
6	(United States) Lee Janzen	3&2
11	(United States) Glen Day
3	(United States) Phil Mickelson	3&2
14	(Japan) Joe Ozaki
7	(Australia) Greg Norman	3&2
10	(United States) John Cook
2	(England) Lee Westwood
15	(Argentina) Eduardo Romero	3&2

Second round February 25
16	(United States) Steve Pate	1up
9	(United States) Brandt Jobe
5	(United States) Scott Hoch
4	(United States) Fred Couples	1up
6	(United States) Lee Janzen
3	(United States) Phil Mickelson	2&1
7	(Australia) Greg Norman
15	(Argentina) Eduardo Romero	21h

Third round February 26
16	(United States) Steve Pate	1up
4	(United States) Fred Couples
3	(United States) Phil Mickelson
15	(Argentina) Eduardo Romero	2&1

Fourth round February 27
16	(United States) Steve Pate	3&2
15	(Argentina) Eduardo Romero

=== Gary Player bracket ===
First round February 24
1	(United States) David Duval	2&1
16	(Australia) Stephen Leaney
8	(Australia) Stuart Appleby
9	(United States) Bill Glasson	2&1
5	(United States) Brian Watts
12	(Denmark) Thomas Bjørn	1up
4	(Northern Ireland) Darren Clarke
13	(United States) Andrew Magee	1up
6	(United States) Steve Stricker
11	(Japan) Shigeki Maruyama	3&2
3	(United States) Justin Leonard	4&3
14	(Spain) Miguel Á. Jiménez
7	(United States) Hal Sutton
10	(United States) Loren Roberts	5&4
2	(South Africa) Ernie Els
15	(United States) Paul Azinger	1up

Second round February 25
1	(United States) David Duval
9	(United States) Bill Glasson	2&1
12	(Denmark) Thomas Bjørn
13	(United States) Andrew Magee	2&1
11	(Japan) Shigeki Maruyama	4&2
3	(United States) Justin Leonard
10	(United States) Loren Roberts	2&1
15	(United States) Paul Azinger

Third round February 26
9	(United States) Bill Glasson
13	(United States) Andrew Magee	1up
11	(Japan) Shigeki Maruyama	2&1
10	(United States) Loren Roberts

Fourth round February 27
13	(United States) Andrew Magee	1up
11	(Japan) Shigeki Maruyama

=== Sam Snead bracket ===
First round February 24
1	(United States) Mark O'Meara
16	(United States) Michael Bradley	4&2
8	(Spain) José M. Olazábal	5&3
9	(United States) Billy Mayfair
5	(United States) Tom Lehman
12	(United States) Scott Verplank	3&1
4	(Australia) Steve Elkington
13	(United States) Steve Jones	2&1
6	(United States) Mark Calcavecchia
11	(Paraguay) Carlos Franco	2&1
3	(United States) Jim Furyk
14	(Sweden) Patrik Sjöland	5&3
7	(United States) John Huston	3&2
10	(United States) Bob Estes
2	(Scotland) Colin Montgomerie
15	(United States) Craig Stadler	5&3

Second round February 25
16	(United States) Michael Bradley
8	(Spain) José M. Olazábal	2&1
12	(United States) Scott Verplank
13	(United States) Steve Jones	5&4
11	(Paraguay) Carlos Franco
14	(Sweden) Patrik Sjöland	1up
7	(United States) John Huston	2&1
15	(United States) Craig Stadler

Third round February 26
8	(Spain) José M. Olazábal	1up
13	(United States) Steve Jones
14	(Sweden) Patrik Sjöland
7	(United States) John Huston	1up

Fourth round February 27
8	(Spain) José M. Olazábal
7	(United States) John Huston	2&1

=== Final Four ===
Semi-finals; February 27
6	(United States) Jeff Maggert	1up
16	(United States) Steve Pate
13	(United States) Andrew Magee	3&1
7	(United States) John Huston

Finals; February 28
6	(United States) Jeff Maggert	38h
13	(United States) Andrew Magee
Third place
16	(United States) Steve Pate
7	(United States) John Huston	5&4

== Prize money breakdown ==
Place	US ($)
Champion	1,000,000
Runner-up	500,000
Third place	400,000
Fourth place	300,000
Losing quarter-finalists x 4	150,000
Losing third round x 8	75,000
Losing second round x 16	50,000
Losing first round x 32	25,000
Total	$5,000,000
