= Fort Washington Country Club =

Private golf club in California

Fort Washington Golf and Country Club
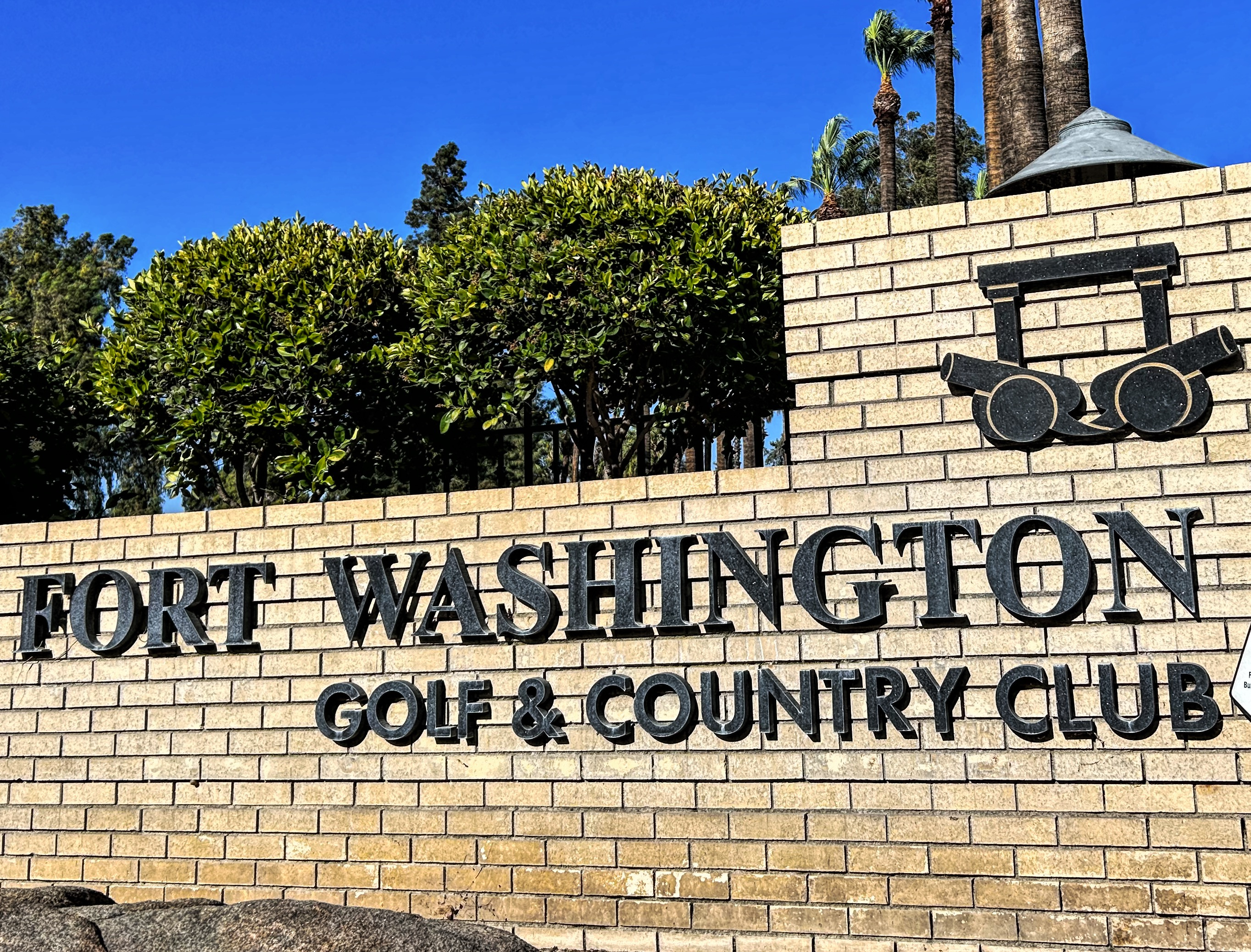

- Location within California
- 36.885°N 119.759°W

Club information
- Location: 10272 N Millbrook Ave, Fresno, California 93730
- Established: 1923, 103 years ago
- Type: Private
- Tota holes: 18
- Website: Fort Washington Golf and Country Club
- Designed by: William Watson
- Par: 72
- Length: 6,728 yd (6,152 m)
- Course rating: 72.8
- Slope rating: 129

Fort Washington Golf and Country Club is a private golf club in northeast Fresno, California established in 1923. The club's name originates from a gold rush-era United States Cavalry fortification built nearby along the San Joaquin River in 1850. The fort was destroyed by a flood two years after it was built. The name Fort Washington was also memorialized as the school district in that area. The facility also hosts large events and weddings.

== History ==
In 1923, a group of Fresno residents formed the Fort Washington Golf Club, selected club officers and purchased 126 acres of land to build a golf course near the Fort Washington schoolhouse. The land, at the time, was an undeveloped grain field. The course was designed by Los Angeles-based golf architect William Watson.

The club began with 40 members and the first golf ball was hit on June 17, 1923, by then president of the club, Dr. Arthur Albright. The original members paid an initiation fee of $50 (equivalent to $945 in 2025), and monthly dues of $2.75, (equivalent to $52 in 2025). During the Roaring Twenties, the game of golf expanded greatly in popularity and the new course at Fort Washington joined Sunnyside Country Club, founded in 1911, as a golfing facility serving the Fresno area. Riverside Country Club, also in Fresno but to the west, opened the same year. At the time the course opened, there were nine completed holes and the other nine were under construction. A small 25 feet (7.6 m) by 25 feet (7.6 m) clubhouse was included in the 1923 construction.

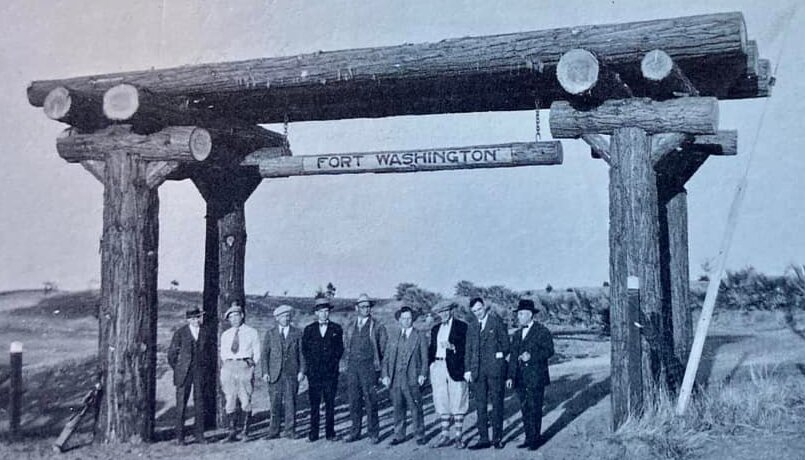
Fort Washington Wooden Archway

Over the following years, the clubhouse was expanded, the depth of the water well was doubled, fairways were planted with grass and the roadways were improved. The roadway improvements included palm trees contributed by Kearney Park and planted by club members. The greens landscaping work was overseen by William Watson, who designed the original course and the greenskeeper was Roy E. Miller, who won the Fresno City Title in 1925. Employees of the Sugar Pine Lumber Company who were also members, built a distinctive log archway in 1928. The archway was removed in 1994.

Olin Dutra, winner of the 1934 U.S. Open, served as the club professional from 1924 to 1928 and was succeeded by Bill Lindgren, then Art Melville in 1929. Melville was born in Carnoustie, Scotland and earned a reputation for his golf skill in the San Joaquin Valley. Melville guided the club through the difficult years of the Great Depression where membership dwindled, as well the outbreak of World War II. Melville later recalled having to "send the old golf balls to the factory to be recovered, since there were no new ones" during the war effort. He continued in his capacity at the club for 32 years. Bob Silva succeeded Melville and served as club professional from 1967 to 1983.

The club has hosted eight California State Open tournaments, stretching over many years. It hosted the 1992 Fresno Open, a tournament on the Ben Hogan Tour, won by Mike Springer. It served as the final PGA Tour qualifying school course to earn a tour card in 1980. In 2001, Fort Washington co-hosted the U.S. Mid-Amateur Golf Championship, along with San Joaquin Country Club. That tournament was won by Tim Jackson.

The club name was changed to Fort Washington Golf and Country Club in 1970. The facility was scouted as a potential filming location for the 1980 sports comedy film Caddyshack. The Fort board of directors decided against giving the film crew permission due to not wanting to "inconvenience the members." A new clubhouse was built in 1991.

=== Scorecard ===
Fort Washington Golf and Country Club
Tee	Rating/Slope	1	2	3	4	5	6	7	8	9	Out	10	11	12	13	14	15	16	17	18	In	Total
Blue	72.8 / 129	483	425	173	443	339	422	204	403	505	3397	424	162	531	412	425	326	514	146	391	3331	6728
White	71.4 /125	468	404	161	425	328	417	197	385	484	3269	410	154	505	398	398	313	509	119	386	3192	6461
Red	69.9 /121	455	385	152	403	314	399	171	365	465	3109	400	145	484	388	374	304	470	104	371	3040	6149
Gold	66.4 / 117	379	379	147	377	280	301	167	318	432	2780	378	140	454	356	368	290	465	100	272	2823	5603
Par		5	4	3	4	4	4	3	4	5	36	4	3	5	4	4	4	5	3	4	36	72
