= Jeff Sluman =

American professional golfer (born 1957)

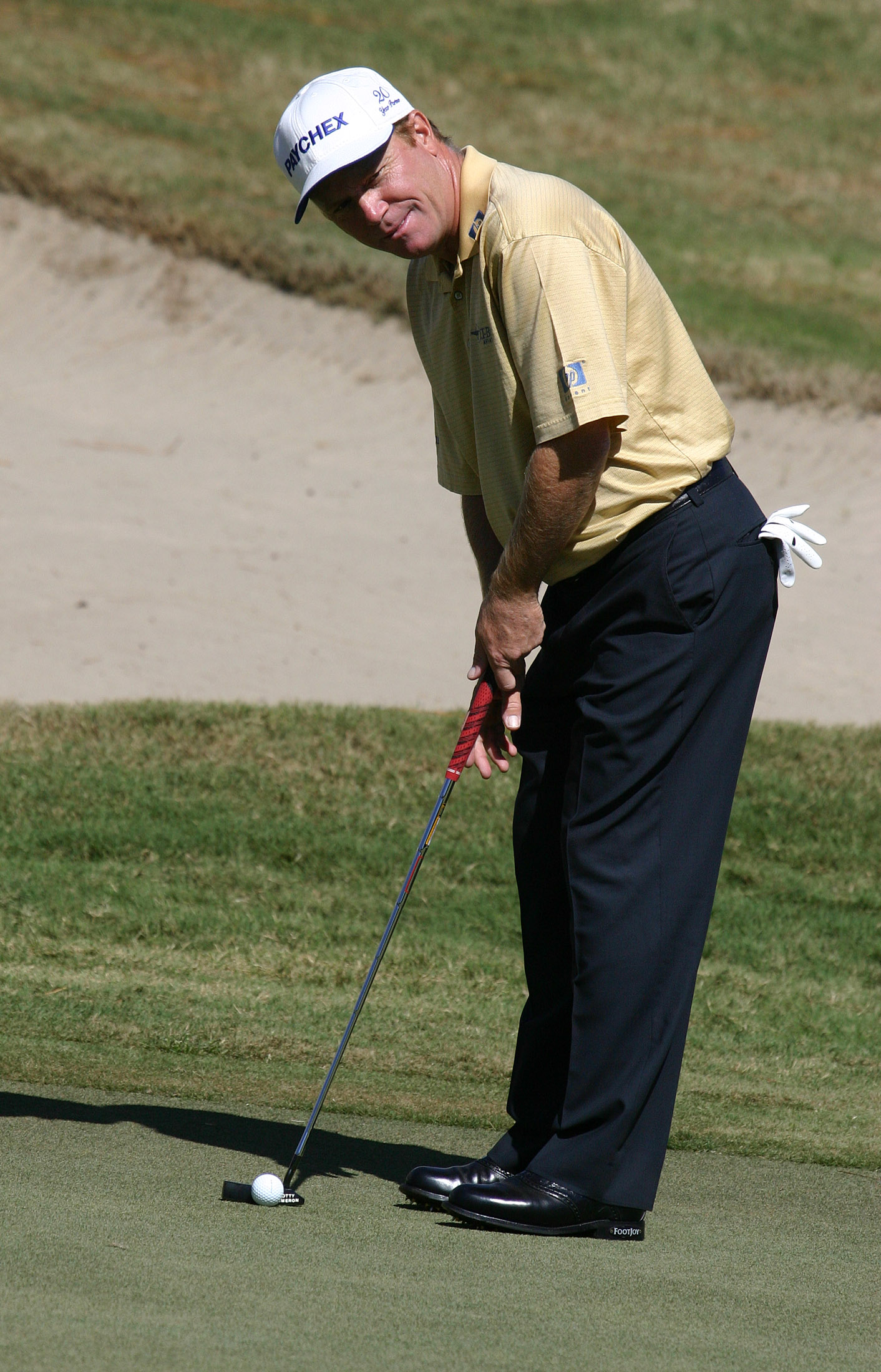

Personal information
- Full name: Jeffrey George Sluman
- Nationality: United States
- Born: September 11, 1957 (age 69) Rochester, New York, U.S.
- Height: 5 ft 7 in (1.70 m)
- Weight: 140 lb (64 kg; 10 st)

Career
- Sport: Golf
- College: Monroe Community College; Florida State University
- Turned professional: 1980
- Current tour: Champions Tour
- Former tour: PGA Tour
- Professional wins: 18
- Highest ranking: 24 (October 11, 1992)

Number of wins by tour
- PGA Tour: 6
- European Tour: 1
- PGA Tour Champions: 6
- Other: 6

Best results in major championships (wins: 1)
- Masters Tournament: T4: 1992
- PGA Championship: Won: 1988
- U.S. Open: 2nd: 1992
- The Open Championship: T25: 1990

Jeffrey George Sluman (born September 11, 1957) is an American professional golfer who has won numerous professional golf tournaments including six PGA Tour victories and one major.

== Early life and amateur career ==
Sluman was born and reared in Rochester, New York. After graduating from Greece Arcadia High School in 1975 and Monroe Community College in 1977, he attended Florida State University in Tallahassee, Florida. He earned a bachelor's degree with a major in finance from FSU in 1980, and turned pro later that year.

== Professional career ==
Sluman has had an unusual career in terms of winning golf tournaments. During what are usually considered a golfers most productive years – their early twenties through their middle thirties – Sluman won only once. At the age of 30, he won the 1988 PGA Championship. Then, shortly before his 40th birthday, he started winning consistently on the Tour and in non-Tour events. After winning the 1997 Tucson Chrysler Classic, he won seven more events including four on the PGA Tour during the next seven seasons. Sluman's best season was in 2002 when he finished the year ranked 15th on the PGA Tour with $2,250,187 in earnings. Despite his rather unusual sequence in respect to tournament wins, Sluman has been one of the Tour's most consistent top 10 finishers throughout his career; his regular career earnings exceeded 18 million dollars.

The 1988 PGA Championship was played at the Oak Tree Golf Club in Edmond, Oklahoma. Sluman won the tournament by three strokes over Paul Azinger, shooting a total of 272. On the final day, Sluman took command of the tournament with a round of 65 that tied David Graham's 1979 mark as the lowest winning round in PGA history.

Upon turning 50 in September 2007, Sluman joined the Champions Tour. He won his first tournament in June 2008, the Bank of America Championship and he also won the First Tee Open in 2008, 2009, and 2011.

When Sluman won 1988 PGA Championship, Ping recognized him with a golden putter as a replica of the Ping PAL 2 he used to win. A second one was made and place in the Ping Gold putter vault.

During the first round of the 1992 Masters, Sluman made history when he recorded a hole-in-one on the fourth hole. To date, this is the only time the fourth hole has been aced at the Masters.

== Personal life ==
Sluman is a fan of Formula One racing, and is friends with former Indianapolis 500 winner Bobby Rahal. He is also a collector of rare, fine wines with about 2,000 bottles in his collection.

== Amateur wins ==
- 1978 New York State Amateur
- 1980 Monroe Invitational

== Professional wins (18) ==
=== PGA Tour wins (6) ===
Legend
Major championships (1)
Other PGA Tour (5)

| No. | Date | Tournament | Winning score | Margin of victory | Runner(s)-up |
|---|---|---|---|---|---|
| 1 | Aug 14, 1988 | PGA Championship | −12 (69-70-68-65=272) | 3 strokes | (United States) Paul Azinger |
| 2 | Feb 23, 1997 | Tucson Chrysler Classic | −13 (75-68-65-67=275) | 1 stroke | (United States) Steve Jones |
| 3 | Sep 6, 1998 | Greater Milwaukee Open | −19 (68-66-63-68=265) | 1 stroke | (United States) Steve Stricker |
| 4 | Jan 17, 1999 | Sony Open in Hawaii | −9 (69-70-66-66=271) | 2 strokes | (United States) Davis Love III, (United States) Jeff Maggert, (United States) Len Mattiace, (United States) Chris Perry, (United States) Tommy Tolles |
| 5 | Jul 22, 2001 | B.C. Open | −22 (67-68-65-66=266) | Playoff | (Australia) Paul Gow |
| 6 | Jul 14, 2002 | Greater Milwaukee Open (2) | −23 (64-66-63-68=261) | 4 strokes | (United States) Tim Herron, (United States) Steve Lowery |

PGA Tour playoff record (1–6)

| No. | Year | Tournament | Opponent(s) | Result |
|---|---|---|---|---|
| 1 | 1987 | Tournament Players Championship | (Scotland) Sandy Lyle | Lost to par on third extra hole |
| 2 | 1991 | Kemper Open | (United States) Billy Andrade | Lost to birdie on first extra hole |
| 3 | 1992 | AT&T Pebble Beach National Pro-Am | (United States) Mark O'Meara | Lost to par on first extra hole |
| 4 | 1998 | FedEx St. Jude Classic | (Zimbabwe) Nick Price | Lost to birdie on second extra hole |
| 5 | 1999 | MCI Classic | (United States) Glen Day, (United States) Payne Stewart | Day won with birdie on first extra hole |
| 6 | 2001 | Nissan Open | (Australia) Robert Allenby, (United States) Brandel Chamblee, (Japan) Toshimitsu Izawa, (United States) Dennis Paulson, (United States) Bob Tway | Allenby won with birdie on first extra hole |
| 7 | 2001 | B.C. Open | (Australia) Paul Gow | Won with birdie on second extra hole |

=== Tournament Player Series wins (1) ===
| No. | Date | Tournament | Winning score | Margin of victory | Runners-up |
|---|---|---|---|---|---|
| 1 | May 5, 1985 | Tallahassee Open | −17 (65-65-74-65=269) | 1 stroke | (United States) Kenny Knox, (South Africa) Gary Player |

=== Other wins (4) ===
| No. | Date | Tournament | Winning score | Margin of victory | Runners-up |
|---|---|---|---|---|---|
| 1 | Aug 3, 1999 | CVS Charity Classic (with (Australia) Stuart Appleby) | −20 (63-59=122) | 2 strokes | (United States) Brett Quigley and (United States) Dana Quigley |
| 2 | Jun 24, 2003 | CVS Charity Classic (2) (with (United States) Rocco Mediate) | −22 (63-57=120) | 1 stroke | (United States) Billy Andrade and (United States) Brad Faxon |
| 3 | Nov 16, 2003 | Franklin Templeton Shootout (with (United States) Hank Kuehne) | −23 (65-58-60=193) | Playoff | (United States) Chad Campbell and (United States) Shaun Micheel, (United States) Brad Faxon and (United States) Scott McCarron |
| 4 | Nov 14, 2004 | Franklin Templeton Shootout (2) (with (United States) Hank Kuehne) | −29 (64-62-61=187) | 2 strokes | (United States) Steve Flesch and (United States) Justin Leonard |

Other playoff record (1–0)

| No. | Year | Tournament | Opponents | Result |
|---|---|---|---|---|
| 1 | 2003 | Franklin Templeton Shootout (with (United States) Hank Kuehne) | (United States) Chad Campbell and (United States) Shaun Micheel, (United States) Brad Faxon and (United States) Scott McCarron | Won with birdie on second extra hole |

=== Champions Tour wins (6) ===
| No. | Date | Tournament | Winning score | Margin of victory | Runner(s)-up |
|---|---|---|---|---|---|
| 1 | Jun 22, 2008 | Bank of America Championship | −17 (68-67-64=199) | 2 strokes | (United States) Loren Roberts |
| 2 | Aug 31, 2008 | Walmart First Tee Open at Pebble Beach | −14 (66-69-67=202) | 5 strokes | (United States) Craig Stadler, (United States) Fuzzy Zoeller |
| 3 | Sep 6, 2009 | Walmart First Tee Open at Pebble Beach (2) | −10 (65-73-68=206) | 2 strokes | (United States) Gene Jones |
| 4 | Jul 10, 2011 | Nature Valley First Tee Open at Pebble Beach (3) | −10 (68-68-70=206) | 2 strokes | (United States) Brad Bryant, (United States) David Eger, (United States) Jay Haas |
| 5 | Apr 28, 2013 | Liberty Mutual Insurance Legends of Golf (with (United States) Brad Faxon) | −23 (62-66-65=193) | 1 stroke | (United States) Fred Funk and (United States) Mike Goodes, (United States) Kenny Perry and (United States) Gene Sauers |
| 6 | Jun 8, 2014 | Big Cedar Lodge Legends of Golf (2) (with (United States) Fred Funk) | −20 (61-50-48=159) | 1 stroke | (United States) Jay Haas and (United States) Peter Jacobsen |

Champions Tour playoff record (0–3)

| No. | Year | Tournament | Opponent(s) | Result |
|---|---|---|---|---|
| 1 | 2009 | Liberty Mutual Legends of Golf (with (United States) Craig Stadler) | (Germany) Bernhard Langer and (United States) Tom Lehman | Lost to par on second extra hole |
| 2 | 2010 | AT&T Championship | (Canada) Rod Spittle | Lost to par on first extra hole |
| 3 | 2014 | Constellation Senior Players Championship | (Germany) Bernhard Langer | Lost to birdie on second extra hole |

=== Other senior wins (1) ===
- 2010 Nedbank Champions Challenge

== Playoff record ==
PGA of Japan Tour playoff record (0–1)

| No. | Year | Tournament | Opponents | Result |
|---|---|---|---|---|
| 1 | 1996 | Sumitomo Visa Taiheiyo Masters | (Italy) Costantino Rocca, (England) Lee Westwood | Westwood won with par on fourth extra hole Sluman eliminated by birdie on first hole |

== Major championships ==
=== Wins (1) ===
| Year | Championship | 54 holes | Winning score | Margin | Runner-up |
|---|---|---|---|---|---|
| 1988 | PGA Championship | 3 shot deficit | −12 (69-70-68-65=272) | 3 strokes | (United States) Paul Azinger |

=== Results timeline ===
| Tournament | 1980 | 1981 | 1982 | 1983 | 1984 | 1985 | 1986 | 1987 | 1988 | 1989 |
|---|---|---|---|---|---|---|---|---|---|---|
| Masters Tournament | | | | | | | | | T45 | T8 |
| U.S. Open | CUT | | | | | | T62 | | CUT | CUT |
| The Open Championship | | | | | | | | | | CUT |
| PGA Championship | | | | | | | T30 | T14 | 1 | T24 |

| Tournament | 1990 | 1991 | 1992 | 1993 | 1994 | 1995 | 1996 | 1997 | 1998 | 1999 |
|---|---|---|---|---|---|---|---|---|---|---|
| Masters Tournament | T27 | T29 | T4 | T17 | T25 | T41 | CUT | T7 | CUT | T31 |
| U.S. Open | T14 | CUT | 2 | T11 | T9 | T13 | T50 | T28 | T10 | CUT |
| The Open Championship | T25 | T101 | CUT | CUT | | | T60 | | | T45 |
| PGA Championship | T31 | T61 | T12 | T61 | T25 | T8 | T41 | CUT | T27 | T54 |

| Tournament | 2000 | 2001 | 2002 | 2003 | 2004 | 2005 | 2006 | 2007 |
|---|---|---|---|---|---|---|---|---|
| Masters Tournament | 18 | | T24 | 44 | 43 | | | T49 |
| U.S. Open | CUT | | T24 | CUT | | | T6 | CUT |
| The Open Championship | T60 | | | CUT | | | T41 | |
| PGA Championship | T41 | CUT | T23 | CUT | T62 | CUT | CUT | CUT |

Win
Top 10
Did not play

CUT = missed the half way cut
"T" indicates a tie for a place.

=== Summary ===
| Tournament | Wins | 2nd | 3rd | Top-5 | Top-10 | Top-25 | Events | Cuts made |
|---|---|---|---|---|---|---|---|---|
| Masters Tournament | 0 | 0 | 0 | 1 | 3 | 7 | 17 | 15 |
| U.S. Open | 0 | 1 | 0 | 1 | 4 | 8 | 19 | 11 |
| The Open Championship | 0 | 0 | 0 | 0 | 0 | 1 | 10 | 6 |
| PGA Championship | 1 | 0 | 0 | 1 | 2 | 7 | 22 | 16 |
| Totals | 1 | 1 | 0 | 3 | 9 | 23 | 68 | 48 |

- Most consecutive cuts made – 7 (1993 PGA – 1995 PGA)
- Longest streak of top-10s – 2 (twice)

== Results in The Players Championship ==
| Tournament | 1986 | 1987 | 1988 | 1989 |
|---|---|---|---|---|
| The Players Championship | T40 | 2 | T45 | CUT |

| Tournament | 1990 | 1991 | 1992 | 1993 | 1994 | 1995 | 1996 | 1997 | 1998 | 1999 |
|---|---|---|---|---|---|---|---|---|---|---|
| The Players Championship | CUT | CUT | T40 | T46 | CUT | T49 | T41 | CUT | CUT | T46 |

| Tournament | 2000 | 2001 | 2002 | 2003 | 2004 | 2005 | 2006 | 2007 |
|---|---|---|---|---|---|---|---|---|
| The Players Championship | T17 | T33 | T4 | T32 | T26 | T46 | T45 | CUT |

Top 10

CUT = missed the halfway cut
"T" indicates a tie for a place

== Results in World Golf Championships ==
| Tournament | 1999 | 2000 | 2001 | 2002 | 2003 | 2004 |
|---|---|---|---|---|---|---|
| Match Play | R64 | R32 | R32 | R64 | R32 | R64 |
| Championship | T34 | | NT^{1} | T43 | | |
| Invitational | | | | | T39 | |

^{1}Cancelled due to 9/11

Did not play

QF, R16, R32, R64 = Round in which player lost in match play
"T" = Tied
NT = No tournament

== Results in senior major championships ==
Results not in chronological order.

| Tournament | 2007 | 2008 | 2009 | 2010 | 2011 | 2012 | 2013 | 2014 | 2015 | 2016 | 2017 | 2018 | 2019 | 2020 | 2021 | 2022 | 2023 | 2024 | 2025 |
|---|---|---|---|---|---|---|---|---|---|---|---|---|---|---|---|---|---|---|---|
| The Tradition | – | T31 | T11 | T29 | T12 | T7 | T8 | T9 | 11 | T23 | T17 | 41 | T43 | NT | T29 | T50 | | T63 | |
| Senior PGA Championship | – | T9 | T5 | T21 | T18 | T44 | T47 | T15 | T7 | CUT | T59 | T19 | CUT | NT | T23 | T66 | | | |
| Senior Players Championship | T17 | T3 | T24 | 4 | T6 | T43 | T16 | 2 | T20 | T9 | T71 | T57 | T54 | T52 | | | T72 | | |
| U.S. Senior Open | – | T18 | T16 | T24 | T17 | T28 | T6 | T5 | CUT | T32 | T12 | CUT | T33 | NT | T46 | T33 | CUT | CUT | CUT |
| Senior British Open Championship | – | T21 | 24 | T11 | T28 | T40 | T57 | T16 | T9 | T12 | T15 | T32 | T36 | NT | T57 | | | CUT | CUT |

Top 10
Did not play

CUT = missed the halfway cut
"T" indicates a tie for a place
NT = no tournament due to COVID-19 pandemic

== See also ==
- 1982 PGA Tour Qualifying School graduates
- 1984 PGA Tour Qualifying School graduates
- List of golfers with most PGA Tour wins
- List of men's major championships winning golfers
