= Reno Open =

Ben Hogan Reno Open
Tournament information
- Location: Reno, Nevada
- Established: 1990
- Course: Northgate Golf Course
- Par: 72
- Tour: Ben Hogan Tour
- Format: Stroke play
- Prize fund: US$100,000
- Month played: September
- Final year: 1991

Tournament record score
- Aggregate: 202 Mike Springer (1990)
- To par: −14 as above

Final champion
- (United States) John Flannery
- Location in the United States Location in Nevada

The Reno Open was a golf tournament on the Ben Hogan Tour that was contested from 1990 to 1991 and played at Northgate Golf Course in Reno, Nevada.

Mike Springer won the inaugural tournament.

John Flannery captured the 1991 edition of the event. He defeated Rob Boldt, Esteban Toledo and Tom Lehman in a sudden-death playoff to earn $20,000 and his first victory on the circuit. The playoff is recognized as one of the most unusual in Tour history. On the second hole, the 18th, Flannery appeared to have won before failing to mark his ball properly on the green, a two-stroke rules violation. Toledo also committed a rules violation on the green and was accessed a one-stroke penalty. Each player carded a six, forcing the playoff into the third-extra hole, where Flannery won the event.

== Winners ==
Year	Winner	Score	To par	Margin of victory	Runners-up
Ben Hogan Reno Open
1991	(United States) John Flannery	211	−5	Playoff	(United States) Rob Boldt (United States) Tom Lehman (Mexico) Esteban Toledo
1990	(United States) Mike Springer	202	−14	1 stroke	(United States) Rick Cramer (United States) Kelly Gibson
