= 1988 PGA Championship =

Coordinates: 35.719°N 97.505°W

Tournament information
- Dates: August 11–14, 1988
- Location: Edmond, Oklahoma
- Course(s): Oak Tree Golf Club
- Organized by: PGA of America
- Tour(s): PGA Tour

Statistics
- Par: 71
- Length: 7,015 yards (6,415 m)
- Field: 150 players, 72 after cut
- Cut: 144 (+2)
- Prize fund: $1.0 million
- Winner's share: $160,000

Champion
- (United States) Jeff Sluman
- 272 (−12)

Location in the United States
Location in Oklahoma

The 1988 PGA Championship was the 70th PGA Championship, held August 11–14 at Oak Tree Golf Club in Edmond, Oklahoma, a suburb north of Oklahoma City. Jeff Sluman shot a final round 65 (−6) to win his only major title, three strokes ahead of runner-up Paul Azinger, the 36-hole and 54-hole leader and former college teammate. Azinger was the reigning Player of the Year on the PGA Tour.

In the penultimate pairing on Sunday, Sluman was three strokes back at the start of the round. After a birdie at the second, he holed out for an eagle on the par-5 fifth, and when Azinger followed with a bogey, the two were tied at nine-under. Sluman had five birdies and an eagle with just one bogey in the final round while Azinger posted a second straight even-par 71. It was also the first of Sluman's six victories on the PGA Tour. In the final pair with Azinger, Dave Rummells shot 75 (+4) and fell to a tie for sixth.

Azinger won the title five years later, defeating Greg Norman in a playoff in 1993.

== Course layout ==
Hole	1	2	3	4	5	6	7	8	9	Out	10	11	12	13	14	15	16	17	18	In	Total
Yards	441	392	584	200	590	377	440	171	386	3,581	379	466	445	149	453	434	479	200	429	3,434	7,015
Par	4	4	5	3	5	4	4	3	4	36	4	4	4	3	4	4	5	3	4	35	71

== Round summaries ==
=== First round ===
Thursday, August 11, 1988

Place	Player	Score	To par
1	(United States) Bob Gilder	66	−5
T2	(United States) Paul Azinger	67	−4
T2	(United States) Chip Beck	67	−4
T2	(United States) John Cook	67	−4
T2	(England) Nick Faldo	67	−4
T6	(United States) Raymond Floyd	68	−3
T6	(United States) Rocco Mediate	68	−3
T6	(Australia) Greg Norman	68	−3
T6	(United States) Jay Overton	68	−3
T6	(United States) Mike Reid	68	−3
T6	(Australia) Peter Senior	68	−3
T6	(United States) Craig Stadler	68	−3

=== Second round ===
Friday, August 12, 1988

Place	Player	Score	To par
1	(United States) Paul Azinger	67-66=133	−9
2	(United States) Jay Overton	68-66=134	−8
T3	(United States) John Cook	67-69=136	−6
T3	(United States) Raymond Floyd	68-68=136	−6
T5	(Australia) David Graham	70-67=137	−5
T5	(United States) Steve Jones	69-68=137	−5
T5	(United States) Gary Koch	72-65=137	−5
T5	(Japan) Tsuneyuki Nakajima	69-68=137	−5
T5	(United States) Dave Rummells	73-64=137	−5
T10	(England) Nick Faldo	67-71=138	−5
T10	(United States) Doug Tewell	70-68=138	−5

=== Third round ===
Saturday, August 13, 1988

Place	Player	Score	To par
1	(United States) Paul Azinger	67-66-71=204	−9
2	(United States) Dave Rummells	73-64-68=205	−8
3	(United States) Jeff Sluman	69-70-68=207	−6
4	(England) Nick Faldo	67-71-70=208	−5
T5	(United States) Steve Jones	69-68-72=209	−4
T5	(United States) Kenny Knox	72-69-68=209	−4
T5	(United States) Payne Stewart	70-69-70=209	−4
T8	(United States) Ben Crenshaw	70-71-69=210	−3
T8	(United States) Raymond Floyd	68-68-74=210	−3
T8	(Australia) David Graham	70-69-70=210	−3
T8	(Zimbabwe) Mark McNulty	73-70-67=210	−3
T8	(United States) Jay Overton	68-66-76=210	−3
T8	(United States) Dan Pohl	69-71-70=210	−3

=== Final round ===
Sunday, August 14, 1988

Place	Player	Score	To par	Money ($)
1	(United States) Jeff Sluman	69-70-68-65=272	−12	160,000
2	(United States) Paul Azinger	67-66-71-71=275	−9	100,000
3	(Japan) Tsuneyuki Nakajima	72-68-71-67=278	−6	70,000
T4	(England) Nick Faldo	67-71-70-71=279	−5	45,800
T4	(United States) Tom Kite	72-69-71-67=279	−5	45,800
T6	(United States) Bob Gilder	66-75-71-68=280	−4	32,500
T6	(United States) Dave Rummells	73-64-68-75=280	−4	32,500
8	(United States) Dan Pohl	69-71-70-71=281	−3	28,000
T9	(United States) Raymond Floyd	68-68-74-72=282	−2	21,500
T9	(United States) Steve Jones	69-68-72-73=282	−2	21,500
T9	(United States) Kenny Knox	72-69-68-73=282	−2	21,500
T9	(United States) Mark O'Meara	70-71-70-71=282	−2	21,500
T9	(Australia) Greg Norman	68-71-72-71=282	−2	21,500
T9	(United States) Payne Stewart	70-69-70-73=282	−2	21,500

==== Scorecard ====
Hole	1	2	3	4	5	6	7	8	9	10	11	12	13	14	15	16	17	18
Par	4	4	5	3	5	4	4	3	4	4	4	4	3	4	4	5	3	4
(United States) Sluman	−6	−7	−7	−7	−9	−9	−10	−10	−10	−11	−11	−12	−11	−11	−12	−12	−12	−12
(United States) Azinger	−10	−10	−10	−10	−9	−8	−8	−8	−8	−8	−8	−8	−8	−8	−8	−9	−10	−9

Cumulative tournament scores, relative to par

Birdie	Eagle	Bogey
