= Esteban Toledo =

Mexican golfer (born 1962)

Personal information
- Nationality: Mexico
- Born: 10 September 1962 (age 64) Mexicali, Mexico
- Height: 5 ft 9 in (1.75 m)
- Weight: 160 lb (73 kg; 11 st)
- Children: 2

Career
- Sport: Golf
- Turned professional: 1986
- Current tour: PGA Tour Champions
- Former tours: PGA Tour; Nationwide Tour
- Professional wins: 6

Number of wins by tour
- Korn Ferry Tour: 1
- PGA Tour Champions: 4
- Other: 1

Best results in major championships
- Masters Tournament: DNP
- PGA Championship: DNP
- U.S. Open: T34: 1999
- The Open Championship: T43: 2002

Esteban Toledo (born 10 September 1962) is a Mexican professional golfer, who was a member of the PGA Tour in 1994 and 1998–2004 and has also spent many years playing on the second tier Nationwide Tour (now known as Korn Ferry Tour). At present, he competes on the PGA Tour Champions.

== Early life ==
Toledo was born in Mexicali, Mexico. Before taking up professional golf, Toledo was a boxer.

== Professional career ==
Toledo made into onto the PGA Tour through 1993 PGA Tour Qualifying School and 1997 PGA Tour Qualifying School. He did not win but recorded runner-up finishes at the 2000 B.C. Open and 2002 Buick Open.

His sole victory on the Nationwide Tour came at the 2005 Lake Erie Charity Classic at Peek 'n Peak Resort. He also won the 2000 Mexican Open. He represented Mexico in the World Cup in 1992, 1994, 1995, 1998, 2002 and 2006.

In May 2013, Toledo became the first Mexican to win on the Champions Tour, winning the Insperity Championship in a playoff. Toledo has since won an additional three times on the Champions Tour at the 2013 Montreal Championship, 2015 Nature Valley First Tee Open at Pebble Beach and 2016 Allianz Championship.

Toledo's life and career is the subject of the book Tin Cup Dreams by Michael D'Antonio.

== Professional wins (6) ==
=== Nationwide Tour wins (1) ===
No.	Date	Tournament	Winning score	Margin of victory	Runner-up
1	1 Jul 2005	Lake Erie Charity Classic	−14 (71-67-65-71=274)	2 strokes	(United States) Jeff Gove

Nationwide Tour playoff record (0–1)

No.	Year	Tournament	Opponents	Result
1	1991	Ben Hogan Reno Open	(United States) Rob Boldt, (United States) John Flannery, (United States) Tom Lehman	Flannery won with birdie on fourth extra hole Boldt and Lehman eliminated by birdie on first hole

=== Other wins (1) ===
- 2000 Mexican Open

=== PGA Tour Champions wins (4) ===
No.	Date	Tournament	Winning score	Margin of victory	Runner(s)-up
1	5 May 2013	Insperity Championship	−6 (72-71-67=210)	Playoff	(United States) Mike Goodes, (United States) Gene Sauers
2	8 Sep 2013	Montreal Championship	−5 (73-69-69=211)	Playoff	(United States) Kenny Perry
3	27 Sep 2015	Nature Valley First Tee Open at Pebble Beach	−9 (71-66-69=206)	1 stroke	(United States) Tom Watson
4	7 Feb 2016	Allianz Championship	−11 (68-70-67=205)	Playoff	(United States) Billy Andrade

PGA Tour Champions playoff record (3–0)

No.	Year	Tournament	Opponent(s)	Result
1	2013	Insperity Championship	(United States) Mike Goodes, (United States) Gene Sauers	Won with par on third extra hole Sauers eliminated by par on second hole
2	2013	Montreal Championship	(United States) Kenny Perry	Won with birdie on third extra hole
3	2016	Allianz Championship	(United States) Billy Andrade	Won with par on third extra hole

== Results in major championships ==
Tournament	1999	2000	2001	2002
U.S. Open	T34		CUT	
The Open Championship				T43

Note: Toledo never played in the Masters Tournament or the PGA Championship.

Did not play

CUT = missed the half-way cut
"T" = tied

== Team appearances ==
- World Cup (representing Mexico): 1992, 1994, 1995, 1998, 2002, 2006

== See also ==
- 1993 PGA Tour Qualifying School graduates
- 1997 PGA Tour Qualifying School graduates
