= Ed Humenik =

American golfer (born 1959)

Personal information
- Nationality: United States
- Born: June 29, 1959 (age 67) Detroit, Michigan, U.S.
- Height: 5 ft 11 in (1.80 m)
- Weight: 220 lb (100 kg; 16 st)

Career
- Sport: Golf
- College: University of Michigan
- Turned professional: 1984
- Former tours: PGA Tour; Nationwide Tour; Golden Bear Tour
- Professional wins: 4

Number of wins by tour
- Korn Ferry Tour: 2
- Other: 2

Best results in major championships
- Masters Tournament: DNP
- PGA Championship: DNP
- U.S. Open: T31: 1991
- The Open Championship: DNP

Ed Humenik (born June 29, 1959) is an American professional golfer who played on the PGA Tour and the Nationwide Tour.

== Career ==
Humenik is a graduate of Aquinas High School in Southgate, Michigan and was a member of the University of Michigan golf team.

In 1989, Humenik joined the PGA Tour gaining his tour card at 1988 PGA Tour Qualifying School. After struggling during his rookie year on tour he joined the Ben Hogan Tour in 1990. He won two events, the Ben Hogan Macon Open and the Ben Hogan Santa Rosa Open en route to a 5th-place finish on the money list which earned him his PGA Tour card for 1991.

In 1991, he finished 121st on the PGA Tour money list just good enough to retain his Tour card, he recorded two top-10 finishes. He bettered his performance in 1992, finishing 100th on the money list, including finishing in a tie for fourth at the Buick Southern Open. He finished 105th on the money list in 1993 and recorded three top-10 finishes. In 1994, he finished 108th on the money list, with the highlight of his year coming at the Greater Greensboro Open where he finished in a tie for second. He did not do as well in 1995 and failed to retain his Tour card. He did not play full-time on Tour again until 1999 when he played on the Nationwide Tour, his final season on Tour. He played in the U.S. Senior Open in 2009 and missed the cut.

== Professional wins (4) ==
=== Ben Hogan Tour wins (2) ===
| No. | Date | Tournament | Winning score | Margin of victory | Runner(s)-up |
|---|---|---|---|---|---|
| 1 | Apr 29, 1990 | Ben Hogan Macon Open | −11 (68-70-67=205) | 1 stroke | (United States) Rick Pearson, (United States) Roger Rowland |
| 2 | Oct 7, 1990 | Ben Hogan Santa Rosa Open | −12 (68-66-70=204) | 3 strokes | (United States) John Flannery |

=== Golden Bear Tour wins (1) ===
| No. | Date | Tournament | Winning score | Margin of victory | Runner-up |
|---|---|---|---|---|---|
| 1 | Sep 19, 1996 | Maxfli Open | −6 (75-70-65=210) | Playoff | (United States) Brian Gay |

=== Other wins (1) ===
- 1988 Michigan Open

== Results in major championships ==
| Tournament | 1989 | 1990 | 1991 | 1992 | 1993 | 1994 | 1995 | 1996 | 1997 |
|---|---|---|---|---|---|---|---|---|---|
| U.S. Open | T67 | | T31 | | | T62 | | | CUT |

Did not play

CUT = missed the half-way cut
"T" = tied
Note: Humenik only played in the U.S. Open.

== See also ==
- 1988 PGA Tour Qualifying School graduates
- 1990 Ben Hogan Tour graduates
