= 1996 Open Championship =

Coordinates: 53.7495°N 3.0180°W

Tournament information
- Dates: 18–21 July 1996
- Location: Lytham St Annes, England
- Course: Royal Lytham & St Annes Golf Club
- Tour(s): European Tour; PGA Tour

Statistics
- Par: 71
- Length: 6,892 yards (6,302 m)
- Field: 156 players, 77 after cut
- Cut: 143 (+1)
- Prize fund: £1,500,000 €1,987,720 $2,200,000
- Winner's share: £200,000 €280,000 $310,000

Champion
- (United States) Tom Lehman
- 271 (−13)

Location in England

The 1996 Open Championship was a men's major golf championship and the 125th Open Championship, held from 18 to 21 July at the Royal Lytham & St Annes Golf Club in Lytham St Annes, England. Tom Lehman won his only major championship by two strokes over runners-up Mark McCumber and Ernie Els. Lehman built a six-stroke lead after 54 holes and became the first American to win at Lytham since Bobby Jones seventy years earlier.

Tiger Woods, age 20, was the only amateur to make the cut and finished tied for 22nd; he turned professional six weeks later. Jack Nicklaus, 56, was one stroke out of the lead after 36 holes, but fell back on the weekend and tied for 45th.

== Course layout ==
Hole	1	2	3	4	5	6	7	8	9	Out	10	11	12	13	14	15	16	17	18	In	Total
Yards	206	437	457	393	212	490	553	418	164	3,330	334	542	198	342	445	463	357	467	414	3,562	6,892
Par	3	4	4	4	3	5	5	4	3	35	4	5	3	4	4	4	4	4	4	36	71

Previous lengths of the course for The Open Championship (since 1950):

- 1988: 6,857 yards (6,270 m)
- 1979: 6,822 yards (6,238 m)
- 1974: 6,822 yards (6,238 m)
- 1969: 6,848 yards (6,262 m)
- 1963: 6,836 yards (6,251 m)
- 1958: 6,635 yards (6,067 m)
- 1952: 6,657 yards (6,087 m)

== Round summaries ==
=== First round ===
Thursday, 18 July 1996

Place	Player	Score	To par
1	(England) Paul Broadhurst	65	−6
T2	(United States) Mark Brooks	67	−4
T2	(United States) Fred Couples	67	−4
T2	(United States) Brad Faxon	67	−4
T2	(United States) Tom Lehman	67	−4
T2	(United States) Mark McCumber	67	−4
T2	(United States) Mark O'Meara	67	−4
T2	(United States) Loren Roberts	67	−4
T2	(Japan) Hidemichi Tanaka	67	−4
T10	(South Africa) Ernie Els	68	−3
T10	(Sweden) Klas Eriksson	68	−3
T10	(England) Nick Faldo	68	−3
T10	(United States) Jim Furyk	68	−3
T10	(Republic of Ireland) Pádraig Harrington	68	−3
T10	(Japan) Shigeki Maruyama	68	−3
T10	(England) Carl Mason	68	−3
T10	(Zimbabwe) Nick Price	68	−3

=== Second round ===
Friday, 19 July 1996

Place	Player	Score	To par
T1	(United States) Tom Lehman	67-67=134	−8
T1	(Republic of Ireland) Paul McGinley	69-65=134	−8
T3	(South Africa) Ernie Els	68-67=135	−7
T3	(Sweden) Peter Hedblom	70-65=135	−7
T3	(United States) Jack Nicklaus	69-66=135	−7
T6	(England) Nick Faldo	68-68=136	−6
T6	(Republic of Ireland) Pádraig Harrington	68-68=136	−6
T6	(United States) Mark McCumber	67-69=136	−6
T6	(United States) Mark O'Meara	67-69=136	−6
T6	(United States) Corey Pavin	70-66=136	−6
T6	(United States) Loren Roberts	67-69=136	−6
T6	(Fiji) Vijay Singh	69-67=136	−6

Amateurs (a): Woods (−1), Bladon (+4), Allan (+5), García (+7).

=== Third round ===
Saturday, 20 July 1996

Place	Player	Score	To par
1	(United States) Tom Lehman	67-67-64=198	−15
2	(England) Nick Faldo	68-68-68=204	−9
T3	(United States) Mark Brooks	67-70-68=205	−8
T3	(Fiji) Vijay Singh	69-67-69=205	−8
T5	(United States) Fred Couples	67-70-69=206	−7
T5	(South Africa) Ernie Els	68-67-71=206	−7
T7	(Northern Ireland) Darren Clarke	70-68-69=207	−6
T7	(United States) Mark McCumber	67-69-71=207	−6
T7	(Japan) Shigeki Maruyama	68-70-69=207	−6
T7	(United States) Steve Stricker	71-70-66=207	−6

=== Final round ===
Sunday, 21 July 1996

Place	Player	Score	To par	Money (£)
1	(United States) Tom Lehman	67-67-64-73=271	−13	200,000
T2	(South Africa) Ernie Els	68-67-71-67=273	−11	125,000
T2	(United States) Mark McCumber	67-69-71-66=273	−11	125,000
4	(England) Nick Faldo	68-68-68-70=274	−10	75,000
T5	(United States) Mark Brooks	67-70-68-71=276	−8	50,000
T5	(United States) Jeff Maggert	69-70-72-65=276	−8	50,000
T7	(United States) Fred Couples	67-70-69-71=277	−7	35,000
T7	(Sweden) Peter Hedblom	70-65-75-67=277	−7	35,000
T7	(Australia) Greg Norman	71-68-71-67=277	−7	35,000
T7	(New Zealand) Greg Turner	72-69-68-68=277	−7	35,000

Amateurs: Woods (−3).
