= 1990 Ben Hogan Tour graduates =

This is a list of players who graduated from the Ben Hogan Tour in 1990. The top five players on the Ben Hogan Tour's money list in 1990 earned their PGA Tour card for 1991.

	1990 Hogan Tour		1991 PGA Tour				
Player	Money list rank	Earnings ($)	Starts	Cuts made	Best finish	Money list rank	Earnings ($)
(United States) Jeff Maggert*	1	108,644	29	17	4	68	240,940
(United States) Jim McGovern*	2	99,841	34	14	T10	141	88,869
(United States) Dick Mast	3	92,521	28	7	T31	216	17,274
(United States) Mike Springer*	4	82,906	28	17	T3	91	178,587
(United States) Ed Humenik	5	78,753	33	14	T7	121	124,497

*PGA Tour rookie for 1991.

T = Tied
Green background indicates the player retained his PGA Tour card for 1992 (finished inside the top 125).
Yellow background indicates player did not retain his PGA Tour card for 1992, but retained conditional status (finished between 126–150).
Red background indicates the player did not retain his PGA Tour card for 1992 (finished outside the top 150).

== See also ==
- 1990 PGA Tour Qualifying School graduates
