= Santa Rosa Open =

Nike Sonoma County Open
Tournament information
- Location: Windsor, California
- Established: 1990
- Course: Windsor Golf Course
- Par: 72
- Tour: Nike Tour
- Format: Stroke play
- Prize fund: US$200,000
- Month played: September/October
- Final year: 1995

Tournament record score
- Aggregate: 269 Stuart Appleby (1995)
- To par: −19 as above

Final champion
- (Australia) Stuart Appleby
- Location in the United States Location in California

The Sonoma County Open was a golf tournament on the Nike Tour. It ran from 1990 to 1995. It was played at Windsor Golf Course in Windsor, California.

In 1995 the winner earned $36,000.

== Winners ==
Year	Winner	Score	To par	Margin of victory	Runner(s)-up
Nike Sonoma County Open
1995	(Australia) Stuart Appleby	269	−19	4 strokes	(United States) Bobby Collins (United States) Joe Durant (United States) Jerry Kelly
1994	(United States) Jerry Haas	277	−11	2 strokes	(United States) Woody Austin
1993	(United States) Sean Murphy	274	−14	1 stroke	(United States) Joey Rassett
Ben Hogan Sonoma County Open
1992	(United States) John Flannery	199	−17	3 strokes	(United States) Mark Wurtz
Ben Hogan Santa Rosa Open
1991	(United States) Tom Lehman	207	−9	1 stroke	(United States) Mike Foster (United States) Brad Greer (United States) Webb Heintzelman (Australia) Jeff Woodland
1990	(United States) Ed Humenik	204	−12	3 strokes	(United States) John Flannery
