= Fresno Open =

Ben Hogan Fresno Open
Tournament information
- Location: Fresno, California
- Established: 1992
- Courses: Fort Washington Golf and Country Club
- Par: 72
- Tour: Ben Hogan Tour
- Format: Stroke play
- Prize fund: US$150,000
- Month played: October
- Final year: 1992

Tournament record score
- Aggregate: 206 Mike Springer (1992)
- To par: −10 as above

Final champion
- (United States) Mike Springer
- Location in the United States Location in California

The Fresno Open was a golf tournament on the Ben Hogan Tour. It was only played in 1992. It was played at Fort Washington Country Club in Fresno, California.

In 1992 the winner earned $30,000.

== Winners ==
Year	Winner	Score	To par	Margin of victory	Runner-up	Ref
Ben Hogan Fresno Open
1992	(United States) Mike Springer	206	−10	1 stroke	(United States) Pete Jordan	
