= Mike Springer =

American golfer

Personal information
- Full name: Michael Paul Springer
- Nationality: United States
- Born: November 3, 1965 (age 60) San Francisco, California, U.S.
- Height: 5 ft 11 in (1.80 m)
- Weight: 210 lb (95 kg; 15 st)

Career
- Sport: Golf
- College: University of Arizona
- Turned professional: 1988
- Former tour: PGA Tour
- Professional wins: 7
- Highest ranking: 73 (October 9, 1994)

Number of wins by tour
- PGA Tour: 2
- Korn Ferry Tour: 4
- Other: 1

Best results in major championships
- Masters Tournament: CUT: 1995
- PGA Championship: T55: 1994
- U.S. Open: T25: 1994
- The Open Championship: T24: 1994

Michael Paul Springer (born November 3, 1965) is an American professional golfer who played on the PGA Tour and the Nationwide Tour.

== Early life and amateur career ==
Springer was born in San Francisco, California. He attended the University of Arizona.

== Professional career ==
Springer turned pro in 1988. He joined the PGA Tour in 1991. He began his career in professional golf on the Ben Hogan Tour. He won three events in this venue in 1990 (including the tour's very first event in Bakersfield) and one in 1992.

Springer's first PGA Tour win came as a wire-to-wire victory in 1994 at the KMart Greater Greensboro Open. His career year was 1994 when he won two PGA Tour events, earned $770,711, and finished 13th on the money list. Springer has 22 top-10 finishes in PGA Tour events. His best finish in a major is a T-24 at the 1994 British Open.

In the 2000s, Springer split his playing time between the PGA Tour and the Nationwide Tour.

== Personal life ==
Springer lives in Fresno, California.

== Amateur wins ==
this list may be incomplete

- 1987 California State Amateur

== Professional wins (7) ==
=== PGA Tour wins (2) ===
No.	Date	Tournament	Winning score	Margin of victory	Runner(s)-up
1	Apr 24, 1994	KMart Greater Greensboro Open	−13 (64-69-70-72=275)	3 strokes	(United States) Brad Bryant, (United States) Ed Humenik, (United States) Hale Irwin
2	Sep 4, 1994	Greater Milwaukee Open	−16 (69-67-65-67=268)	1 stroke	(United States) Loren Roberts

=== Ben Hogan Tour wins (4) ===
No.	Date	Tournament	Winning score	Margin of victory	Runner(s)-up
1	Feb 4, 1990	Ben Hogan Bakersfield Open	−9 (68-70-71=207)	2 strokes	(United States) David Tentis
2	Sep 30, 1990	Ben Hogan Reno Open	−14 (70-67-65=202)	1 stroke	(United States) Rick Cramer, (United States) Kelly Gibson
3	Oct 21, 1990	Ben Hogan El Paso Open	−6 (68-71-65=204)	2 strokes	(United States) Bob Friend
4	Oct 18, 1992	Ben Hogan Fresno Open	−10 (69-66-71=206)	1 stroke	(United States) Pete Jordan

=== Other wins (1) ===
- 1993 JCPenney Classic (with Melissa McNamara)

== Results in major championships ==
Tournament	1993	1994	1995
Masters Tournament			CUT
U.S. Open	CUT	T25	CUT
The Open Championship		T24	CUT
PGA Championship	CUT	T55	CUT

Did not play

CUT = missed the half-way cut
"T" = tied

== See also ==
- 1990 Ben Hogan Tour graduates
- 1999 PGA Tour Qualifying School graduates
- List of golfers with most Web.com Tour wins
