= Oak Tree National =

Golf and country club in Oklahoma

- Interactive map of Oak Tree National
- 35°43′09″N 97°30′19″W

Club information
- Location: Edmond, Oklahoma, U.S.
- Established: 1976
- Type: Private
- Owner: Everett Dobson
- Tota holes: 18
- Tournaments: 1984 U.S. Amateur, 1988 PGA Championship, 2006 Senior PGA Championship, 2014 U.S. Senior Open, 2027 U.S. Senior Open
- Website: Oak Tree National
- Designed by: Pete Dye
- Par: 71
- Length: 7,410 yards
- Course rating: 79.5
- Slope rating: 155

Oak Tree National, formerly called Oak Tree Golf Club, is a golf and country club located in the Oklahoma City suburb of Edmond, Oklahoma. The course was designed by Pete Dye, and it opened in 1976. It plays to a par 71.

== The Course ==
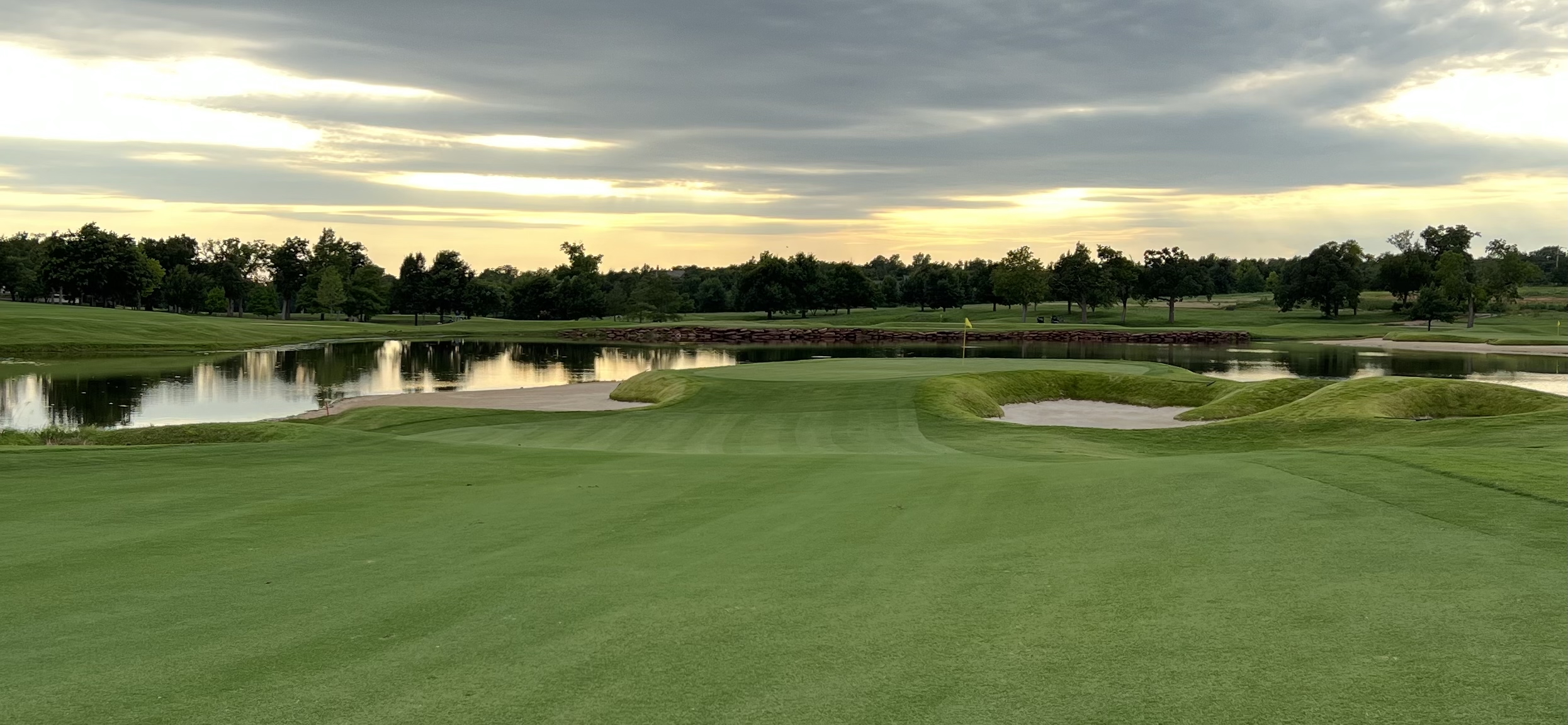
View of 5th green from the fairway

Like other courses in Oklahoma, Oak Tree is a very windy course and can often have winds of at least 30 miles per hour (48 km/h). It also is located on hilly terrain, and uneven lies are common from the fairway or rough. The greens are difficult to hit well, and are undulating enough to make any par tough.

In its 2015–16 listing of the best golf courses by state, Golf Digest ranked Oak Tree National #51 in their Americas 100 Greatest Golf Courses. Also, they ranked it second in the state of Oklahoma. The course was redesigned by Pete Dye in 2002. The course measures 7,410 yards from the tournament tees. However, for the 2006 Senior PGA Championship, the course played to 7,102 yards. Oak Tree has Bermuda grass for the greens and fairways. Water comes into play on 13 of the 18 holes. The course and slope rating is 79.5/155 from the tournament tees.

Each hole has its own name, and some holes are named after famous courses or golf holes. The signature hole is the fifth hole (named Oak Tree), a 592-yard par five where players must avoid the oak tree that is used in the club's logo. Other notable holes include the eighth hole (named Harbor Town after Dye's Harbour Town Golf Links), par three with water down the entire left side. The twelfth hole (named after the Prairie Dunes Country Club) is a tight par four. The 13th hole is named due to its size, after a postage stamp. Golfers liken landing a ball on the green to landing a ball on a space the size of a postage stamp.

Hole	Name	Yards	Par
1	The Oaks	451	4
2	Dub's Dread	418	4
3	Coe's Corner	597	5
4	Waterloo	206	3
5	Oak Tree	592	5
6	Muirfield	411	4
7	Dye's Dread	462	4
8	Harbor Town	185	3
9	Valley of Sin	480	4
10	Teeth of the Dog	402	4
11	Windmill	465	4
12	Prairie Dunes	471	4
13	Postage Stamp	171	3
14	Augusta	457	4
15	Deerfield	472	4
16	Box Car	538	5
17	Eternity	196	3
18	Plateau	436	4
Total		7,410	71

== Notable Professionals ==
Oak Tree is the home course of several PGA Tour, Korn Ferry Tour, PGA Tour Champions and LIV Golf players: David Edwards, Mark Hayes, Gil Morgan, Doug Tewell, Bob Tway, Viktor Hovland, Max McGreevy, Taylor Moore, Austin Eckroat, Josh Creel, Michael Gellerman, Jonathan Brightwell, Zach Bauchou, Logan McAllister, Eugenio Chacarra, Talor Gooch, Matthew Wolff, Scott Verplank, Willie Wood, Kevin Tway, and Rhein Gibson. Female Professional Golfer: Kaitlin Milligan

== Tournaments Held ==
Year	Tournament	Winner
1984	U.S. Amateur	Scott Verplank
**1988**	PGA Championship	Jeff Sluman
2000	PGA Professional National Championship	Tim Thelen
2006	Senior PGA Championship	Jay Haas
2012	Trans-Mississippi Amateur	Tyler Raber
2014	U.S. Senior Open	Colin Montgomerie
2027	U.S. Senior Open	

Bolded years are major championships on the PGA Tour.

Oak Tree has hosted a major championship and a senior major championship in addition to numerous other PGA of America championships and one United States Golf Association-sanctioned championship.

The first notable tournament to be held at Oak Tree was the 1984 U.S. Amateur which was won by Scott Verplank. In 1988, the PGA Championship came to Oak Tree. Jeff Sluman won with a score of twelve under par 272, clinched with a final round 65. In 2000, the PGA Club Professional Championship was held at Oak Tree; Tim Thelen won it in a playoff. Most recently, in 2006, the Senior PGA Championship was held at Oak Tree. Over the four days, gusty winds kept scores barely under par. Jay Haas defeated Brad Bryant in a playoff with a final score of 279, five under par.

Oak Tree hosted the 2014 U.S. Senior Open, won by Colin Montgomerie.

Oak Tree will host the 2027 U.S. Senior Open.

== Controversy ==
Oak Tree has been criticized for having a noose hang off of a tree to the left of the green on the par five sixteenth hole. A columnist from The Oklahoman criticized it as a possible symbol of racism in an October 2004 column. It was removed soon after, well before the 2006 Senior PGA Championship. It was originally placed there by a golfer who had struggled on the hole.

Oak Tree was also to have hosted the 1994 PGA Championship. However, it was moved to Southern Hills Country Club in Tulsa originally because of the club's filing Chapter 11 bankruptcy in 1990. Later on, it was publicized that Oak Tree had few or no minority or women members in its membership. This further caused the PGA of America to move the tournament to Southern Hills.
