= Texas State Open =

The Texas State Open is the Texas state open golf tournament, open to both amateur and professional golfers. It is organized by the Northern Texas section of the PGA of America. It was first played in 1960 and has been played annually since 1975 at a variety of courses around the state.

== Winners ==
Texas State Open champions
Year	Champion	Course	Location
1960	Homero Blancas	Sharpstown Park Golf Course	Houston
1961–1964	No tournament		
1965	Lee Trevino	Sharpstown Park Golf Course	Houston
1966	Lee Trevino	Sharpstown Park Golf Course	Houston
1967	Jack Burke Jr.	Champions Golf Club	Houston
1968–1974	No tournament		
1975	Ben Crenshaw	Horseshoe Bay Country Club	Horseshoe Bay
1976	Keith Fergus	Horseshoe Bay Country Club	Horseshoe Bay
1977	Bobby Walzel	Horseshoe Bay Country Club	Horseshoe Bay
1978	Jeff Mitchell	Horseshoe Bay Country Club	Horseshoe Bay
1979	Ben Crenshaw	Horseshoe Bay Country Club	Horseshoe Bay
1980	Ben Crenshaw	Horseshoe Bay Country Club	Horseshoe Bay
1981	Terry Snodgrass	Horseshoe Bay Country Club	Horseshoe Bay
1982	Stan Algelt	Tapatio Springs Hill Country Resort	Boerne
1983	Frank Conner	Tapatio Springs Hill Country Resort	Boerne
1984	Scott Stegner	Bear Creek Golf Club	Euless
1985	Terry Snodgrass	Bear Creek Golf Club	Euless
1986	Blaine McCallister	The Woodlands Country Club	The Woodlands
1987	Carl Baker	The Woodlands Country Club	The Woodlands
1988	Jeff Maggert	The Woodlands Country Club	The Woodlands
1989	Tray Tyner	The Woodlands Country Club	The Woodlands
1990	Jeff Maggert	The Woodlands Country Club	The Woodlands
1990	Jeff Maggert	Cypresswood Golf Club	Spring
1991	Mike Peck	Firewheel Golf Park	Garland
1992	Clark Dennis	Firewheel Golf Park	Garland
1993	Jeff Lee	Firewheel Golf Park	Garland
1994	Jeff Maggert	The Woodlands Country Club	The Woodlands
1995	Brad Lardon	The Woodlands Country Club	The Woodlands
1996	Brad Lardon	The Woodlands Country Club	The Woodlands
1997	Kris Cox	The Clubs of Stonebridge Ranch	McKinney
1998	Cameron Beckman	The Clubs of Stonebridge Ranch	McKinney
1999	Stuart Wallace	Bear Creek Golf Club	Euless
2000	Mike Shevlin	Bear Creek Golf Club	Euless
2001	Joey Gullion	Waterchase Golf Club	Fort Worth
2002	Kelly Grunewald	Woodbridge Golf Club	Wylie
2003	Casey Devoll	White Bluff Resort	Whitney
2004	Mark Walker	White Bluff Resort	Whitney
2005	Kelly Grunewald	White Bluff Resort	Whitney
2006	Kelly Grunewald	Cascades Country Club	Tyler
2007	Matt Loving	Cascades Country Club	Tyler
2008	Martin Piller	Cascades Country Club	Tyler
2009	Mikel Martinson	Cascades Country Club	Tyler
2010	Robert Gwin	Cascades Country Club	Tyler
2011	Shawn Stefani	Cascades Country Club	Tyler
2012	Nathan Tyler	The Lakes at Castle Hills	Lewisville
2013	Chris Ward	The Lakes at Castle Hills	Lewisville
2014	Anthony Broussard	The Lakes at Castle Hills	Lewisville
2015	Dustin Morris	The Lakes at Castle Hills	Lewisville
2016	Juan Fernandez	The Lakes at Castle Hills	Lewisville
2017	Brax McCarthy	Trinity Forest Golf Club	Dallas
2018	Ben Kern	Cascades Country Club	Tyler
2019	Kyle Pritchard	Cascades Country Club	Tyler
2020	Mitchell Meissner	Cascades Country Club	Tyler
2021	Jack Ireland	Cascades Country Club	Tyler
2022	Luke Long	Cascades Country Club	Tyler
2023	Zach James	Cascades Country Club	Tyler
2024	Tanner Napier	Cascades Country Club	Tyler
2025	Matthew Watkins	Cascades Country Club	Tyler
2026	Matthew Watkins	Cascades Country Club	Tyler
