= Ping Gold Putter Vault =

The Ping Gold Putter Vault provides the storage of the golf clubs from the Ping Gold Putter Program that was initiated by Karsten Solheim (Founder of American golf equipment manufacturer Ping), to commemorate a golfer's victory using a Ping putter. Since the 1970s, tournament champions are presented with a gold-plated putter matching the specs of their putter and engraved with both their name and the name of the tournament won. A replica of the golf club is stored in a vault at the Ping headquarters in Phoenix, Arizona.

== History ==
As a friend of Karsten Solheim, comedian Jackie Gleason inspired him to make golden Ping clubs. Gleason requested a gold Ping putter reasoning that everything that he has is gold. After getting the putter, Gleason asked Solheim if he could get a whole set made entirely of gold.

Ping debuted a Vault line in 2016. Ping launched Vault 2.0 line in 2018. The Vault 2.0 club heads are finished with a gold color.

As of January 2019, the Ping Gold Putter Vault contains over 3,000 golden clubs. The vault can grow in two ways: more wins with Ping clubs or documenting wins with Ping clubs that have not yet been recognized. Not all that have won a Tour event with Ping have received a golden club because they have been missed. If it can be documented that the win happened with Ping then the manufacture is very interested in adding that player's golden club to the vault, and of course providing the player with theirs.

In April 2014 Ping moved the "Ping Gold Putter Vault" because the collection had outgrown the size of vault being used.

The oldest golden putter in the vault belongs to John Barnum for the Ping win of the 1962 Cajun Classic with a model 69. The collection includes winning putters from 106 major championships between the PGA Tour, PGA Tour Champions and LPGA Tour. All four men's majors in 1988 have a golden club in the vault: the Masters Tournament (Sandy Lyle), the U.S. Open (Curtis Strange), The Open Championship (Seve Ballesteros), and the PGA Championship (Jeff Sluman). With more than 500 wins, the Ping Anser is in the vault the most.

Ballesteros has the most gold clubs in the vault due to wins with Ping (47). Lee Westwood has the most golden clubs in the vault overall because as a Ping staff player there are clubs in the vault commemorating milestones and achievements.

One of the few non-putter clubs in the room is the 52° Ping Tour W wedge like the one Bubba Watson used for his recovery shot winning him the 2012 Masters Tournament. Watson won the 2014 Masters Tournament with a Ping Anser 1 Milled and Ping recognized the feat by making him a solid gold putter worth $30,000 in gold (as of 2014), rather than the "standard" gold-plated putter.

Christie Kerr bought her 2007 U.S. Women's Open winning Ping G5i Craz-E at a South Korean golf store. Two gold versions of Kerr's winning putter were made, with one currently in the vault.
