= Jeff Maggert =

American professional golfer (born 1964)

Personal information
- Full name: Jeffrey Allan Maggert
- Nationality: United States
- Born: February 20, 1964 (age 62) Columbia, Missouri, U.S.
- Height: 5 ft 9 in (1.75 m)
- Weight: 165 lb (75 kg)
- Spouse: Michelle Austin Maggert
- Children: 4

Career
- Sport: Golf
- College: Texas A&M University
- Turned professional: 1986
- Current tour: PGA Tour Champions
- Former tours: PGA Tour; Ben Hogan Tour
- Professional wins: 19
- Highest ranking: 14 (May 30, 1999)

Number of wins by tour
- PGA Tour: 3
- European Tour: 1
- PGA Tour of Australasia: 1
- Korn Ferry Tour: 2
- PGA Tour Champions: 6
- Other: 7

Best results in major championships
- Masters Tournament: 5th: 2003
- PGA Championship: 3rd/T3: 1995, 1997
- U.S. Open: 3rd: 2002, 2004
- The Open Championship: T5: 1996

Achievements and awards
- Ben Hogan Tour money list winner: 1990
- Ben Hogan Tour Player of the Year: 1990

Jeffrey Allan Maggert (born February 20, 1964) is an American professional golfer who plays on the PGA Tour Champions.

== Early life and amateur career ==
Maggert was born in Columbia, Missouri. He was raised on a golf course in The Woodlands, Texas, where he attended McCullough High School.

He attended Texas A&M University. Maggert was an All-American member of the golf team.

== Professional career ==
Maggert turned professional in 1986. Early in his career he played overseas, especially on the Asia Golf Circuit and PGA Tour of Australia. He had some early success, winning the 1989 Malaysian Open on the AGC and the 1990 Vines Classic on the Australian Tour.

Early in 1990, he qualified for the Ben Hogan Tour, the PGA Tour's developmental tour. He was Player of the Year in 1990 where he won two tournaments. Maggert's good play on the Ben Hogan Tour ensured a promotion to the PGA Tour for 1991. He has won three times and finished runner-up 16 times on the PGA Tour. He has represented the United States in the Ryder Cup three times and in the Presidents Cup once.

In April 1994, Maggert recorded a double eagle on the 13th hole at the Masters. Seven years later in June 2001, he recorded a double eagle on the 6th hole of the U.S. Open. Maggert is the first (and as of 2025, only) golfer to record multiple double eagles during major championships.

In April 2003, Maggert was the 54-hole leader at The Masters, having shot a third round of 66 to charge through the field. He endured a disappointing final round, that included a triple bogey on the third hole, after the ball rebounded off the bunker lip and struck him, and then a quintuple bogey on the 12th after finding the water twice. Maggert would finish in solo fifth place, his career best finish at the Masters.

He withdrew from The Players Championship in 2008 after completing one round, when he learned that his older brother, Barry, had died in a single-engine airplane crash in Gilpin County, Colorado.

He started the 2012 season on a medical exemption after shoulder surgery in June. His 2011 season was limited to 18 events, making six cuts. He went to Q School to back up the nine starts and $567,086 on his exemption. Maggert could not satisfy his medical exemption and played the remainder of the 2012 season in the Q School/Nationwide Tour graduate category. He still managed to barely retain a PGA Tour card, finishing 123rd on the money list.

=== Senior career ===
Maggert won on his Champions Tour debut in March 2014 at the Mississippi Gulf Resort Classic, becoming the 17th player to do so. He also became the seventh player to win on all the PGA Tour sponsored major tours (PGA Tour, Web.com Tour, and Champions Tour). He finished the three rounds at 11-under-par, two strokes ahead of Billy Andrade.

In May 2015, Maggert won his maiden senior major championship and second Champions Tour event at the Regions Tradition. After finishing in a tie at 14-under-par after regulation play, he defeated Kevin Sutherland in sudden-death playoff on the first extra hole with a birdie.

The following month, Maggert won his second senior major championship with a two stroke victory over Colin Montgomerie at the U.S. Senior Open. He began the final round tied for the lead with Bernhard Langer, but shot a five-under-par 65 to pull clear of the field and claim the win.

On November 10, 2019, Maggert won the season-ending event on the PGA Tour Champions, the Charles Schwab Cup Championship. Maggert won the event in dramatic fashion by holing out a wedge from the fairway for eagle on the third playoff hole, defeating Retief Goosen.

== Professional wins (19) ==
=== PGA Tour wins (3) ===
Legend
World Golf Championships (1)
Other PGA Tour (2)

No.	Date	Tournament	Winning score	Margin of victory	Runner-up
1	Oct 10, 1993	Walt Disney World/Oldsmobile Classic	−23 (66-65-66-68=265)	3 strokes	(United States) Greg Kraft
2	Feb 28, 1999	WGC-Andersen Consulting Match Play Championship	38 holes		(United States) Andrew Magee
3	May 16, 2006	FedEx St. Jude Classic	−9 (72-66-68-65=271)	3 strokes	(United States) Tom Pernice Jr.

PGA Tour playoff record (0–1)

No.	Year	Tournament	Opponent	Result
1	1996	Shell Houston Open	(United States) Mark Brooks	Lost to birdie on first extra hole

=== Asia Golf Circuit wins (1) ===
No.	Date	Tournament	Winning score	Margin of victory	Runners-up
1	Apr 2, 1989	Benson & Hedges Malaysian Open	−5 (71-73-71-68=283)	5 strokes	(United States) Greg Bruckner, (United States) Bob Lendzion, (United States) Craig McClellan, (United States) Casey Nakama

Asia Golf Circuit playoff record (0–1)

No.	Year	Tournament	Opponents	Result
1	1987	Singapore Open	(Australia) Peter Fowler, (Taiwan) Hsu Sheng-san	Fowler won with birdie on third extra hole

=== PGA Tour of Australia wins (1) ===
No.	Date	Tournament	Winning score	Margin of victory	Runner-up
1	Jan 28, 1990	Vines Classic	−7 (64-71-73-73=281)	1 stroke	(Australia) Brett Ogle

=== Ben Hogan Tour wins (2) ===
No.	Date	Tournament	Winning score	Margin of victory	Runner(s)-up
1	May 13, 1990	Ben Hogan Knoxville Open	−11 (70-66-66=202)	Playoff	(United States) Greg Ladehoff
2	Jul 22, 1990	Ben Hogan Buffalo Open	−12 (67-69-68=204)	Playoff	(United States) Carl Cooper, (United States) Greg Ladehoff

Ben Hogan Tour playoff record (2–1)

No.	Year	Tournament	Opponent(s)	Result
1	1990	Ben Hogan Knoxville Open	(United States) Greg Ladehoff	Won with eagle on first extra hole
2	1990	Ben Hogan Elizabethtown Open	(United States) Dicky Thompson	Lost to par on second extra hole
3	1990	Ben Hogan Buffalo Open	(United States) Carl Cooper, (United States) Greg Ladehoff	Won with birdie on first extra hole

=== Other wins (6) ===
- 1988 Texas State Open, St. Louis Open
- 1990 Texas State Open
- 1994 Texas State Open, Diners Club Matches (with Jim McGovern)
- 1997 Diners Club Matches (with Steve Elkington)

=== PGA Tour Champions wins (6) ===
Legend
PGA Tour Champions major championships (2)
Charles Schwab Cup playoff events (1)
Other PGA Tour Champions (3)

No.	Date	Tournament	Winning score	Margin of victory	Runner-up
1	Mar 23, 2014	Mississippi Gulf Resort Classic	−11 (68-69-68=205)	2 strokes	(United States) Billy Andrade
2	May 17, 2015	Regions Tradition	−14 (67-67-68-72=274)	Playoff	(United States) Kevin Sutherland
3	Jun 28, 2015	U.S. Senior Open	−10 (70-65-70-65=270)	2 strokes	(Scotland) Colin Montgomerie
4	Aug 9, 2015	Shaw Charity Classic	−16 (67-63-64=194)	4 strokes	(Scotland) Colin Montgomerie
5	Aug 30, 2015	Dick's Sporting Goods Open	−14 (68-68-66=202)	2 strokes	(United States) Paul Goydos
6	Nov 10, 2019	Charles Schwab Cup Championship	−21 (63-65-69-66=263)	Playoff	(South Africa) Retief Goosen

PGA Tour Champions playoff record (2–1)

No.	Year	Tournament	Opponent	Result
1	2015	Regions Tradition	(United States) Kevin Sutherland	Won with par on first extra hole
2	2018	Constellation Senior Players Championship	(Fiji) Vijay Singh	Lost to birdie on second extra hole
3	2019	Charles Schwab Cup Championship	(South Africa) Retief Goosen	Won with eagle on third extra hole

== Results in major championships ==
Tournament	1986	1987	1988	1989
Masters Tournament				
U.S. Open	CUT	CUT		
The Open Championship				
PGA Championship				

Tournament	1990	1991	1992	1993	1994	1995	1996	1997	1998	1999
Masters Tournament				T21	T50	CUT	T7	CUT	T23	CUT
U.S. Open				T52	T9	T4	T97	4	T7	T7
The Open Championship			CUT	CUT	T24	T68	T5	T51	CUT	T30
PGA Championship			6	T51	CUT	T3	T73	3	T44	CUT

Tournament	2000	2001	2002	2003	2004	2005	2006	2007	2008	2009
Masters Tournament	CUT	T20		5	CUT	T20				
U.S. Open	CUT	T44	3	CUT	3	T78				
The Open Championship	T41	CUT	T47				CUT			
PGA Championship	CUT	CUT	CUT	CUT		CUT	T62			

Tournament	2010	2011	2012	2013	2014	2015	2016
Masters Tournament							
U.S. Open					CUT		CUT
The Open Championship							
PGA Championship							

Top 10
Did not play

CUT = missed the half-way cut
"T" = tied

=== Summary ===
Tournament	Wins	2nd	3rd	Top-5	Top-10	Top-25	Events	Cuts made
Masters Tournament	0	0	0	1	2	6	12	7
U.S. Open	0	0	2	4	7	7	17	11
The Open Championship	0	0	0	1	1	2	12	7
PGA Championship	0	0	2	2	3	3	14	7
Totals	0	0	4	8	13	18	55	32

- Most consecutive cuts made – 7 (1995 U.S. Open – 1996 PGA)
- Longest streak of top-10s – 2 (1995 PGA – 1996 Masters)

== Results in The Players Championship ==
Tournament	1991	1992	1993	1994	1995	1996	1997	1998	1999
The Players Championship	CUT	T54	CUT	3	T18	T53	CUT	T51	T46

Tournament	2000	2001	2002	2003	2004	2005	2006	2007	2008	2009
The Players Championship	T3	CUT	T14	T11	T33	T46	T45	CUT	WD	

Tournament	2010	2011	2012	2013	2014
The Players Championship			T35	T2	T48

Top 10
Did not play

CUT = missed the halfway cut
WD = withdrew
"T" indicates a tie for a place

== World Golf Championships ==
=== Wins (1) ===
Year	Championship	Winning score	Margin	Runner-up
1999	WGC-Andersen Consulting Match Play Championship	38 holes		(United States) Andrew Magee

=== Results timeline ===
Tournament	1999	2000	2001	2002	2003	2004	2005	2006
Match Play	1	R64					R64	
Championship	T48	39	NT^{1}					
Invitational	T7	T24						T59

^{1}Cancelled due to 9/11

Win
Top 10
Did not play

QF, R16, R32, R64 = Round in which player lost in match play
NT = No tournament
"T" = tied

== Senior major championships ==
=== Wins (2) ===
Year	Championship	54 holes	Winning score	Margin	Runner-up
2015	Regions Tradition	1 shot lead	−14 (67-67-68-72=274 )	Playoff	(United States) Kevin Sutherland
2015	U.S. Senior Open	Tied for lead	−10 (70-65-70-65=270)	2 strokes	(Scotland) Colin Montgomerie

=== Results timeline ===
Results not in chronological order.

Tournament	2014	2015	2016	2017	2018	2019	2020	2021	2022	2023	2024	2025	2026
Senior PGA Championship	T9	T22	T31	T59	CUT	T21	NT	CUT	T39	76	CUT	65	CUT
The Tradition	21	1	T38	T42	T5	T6	NT	T19	T40		T39	62	T63
U.S. Senior Open	T55	1	T30	T23	T49	T47	NT	T23	CUT	T32	T51	CUT	T36
Senior Players Championship		T12	T36	T35	2	T39	T52	T32	65	T13	T70	T25	57
Senior British Open Championship		T7	T54	T31	T50		NT			CUT	CUT	CUT	T45

Win
Top 10
Did not play

CUT = missed the halfway cut
"T" indicates a tie for a place
NT = no tournament due to COVID-19 pandemic

== U.S. national team appearances ==
- Presidents Cup: 1994 (winners)
- Ryder Cup: 1995, 1997, 1999 (winners)

== See also ==
- 1990 Ben Hogan Tour graduates
- 2011 PGA Tour Qualifying School graduates
