= Mike Goodes =

American professional golfer (born 1956)

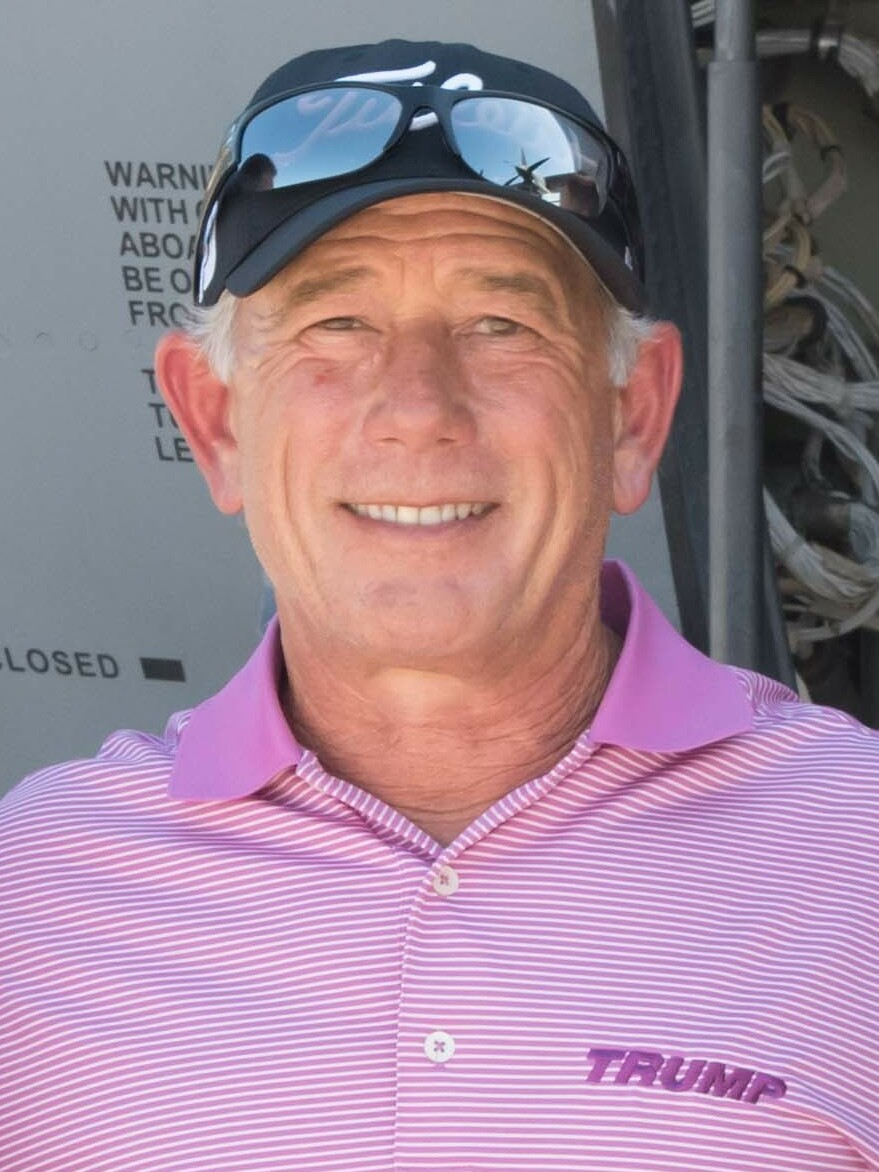
- Goodes in 2017

Personal information
- Nationality: United States
- Born: December 3, 1956 (age 69) Reidsville, North Carolina, U.S.
- Height: 5 ft 9 in (1.75 m)

Career
- Sport: Golf
- College: University of North Carolina
- Turned professional: 2007
- Current tour: Champions Tour
- Professional wins: 2

Number of wins by tour
- PGA Tour Champions: 1
- Other: 1

Mike Goodes (born December 3, 1956) is an American professional golfer.

== Career ==
In 1956, Goodes was born in Reidsville, North Carolina. He won several amateur tournaments in the Carolinas, and attended the University of North Carolina, but did not play on the golf team.

In 2007, Goodes turned professional. He gained status on the Champions Tour via open qualifying. He finished 5th at the 2007 Champions Tour Q-school which allowed him to open qualify for tour events again in 2008. He finished 29th on the money list in 2008, earning his tour card for 2009. He won his first event of 2009, the Allianz Championship.

== Amateur wins ==
- 1989 North Carolina Amateur
- 1998 Carolinas Mid-Amateur
- 2004 Carolinas Mid-Amateur
- 2006 North Carolina Amateur, North Carolina Mid-Amateur, Carolinas Mid-Amateur

== Professional wins (2) ==
=== Champions Tour wins (1) ===
No.	Date	Tournament	Winning score	Margin of victory	Runner-up
1	Feb 15, 2009	Allianz Championship	−15 (67-68-66=201)	1 stroke	(South Africa) Fulton Allem

Champions Tour playoff record (0–1)

No.	Year	Tournament	Opponents	Result
1	2013	Insperity Championship	(United States) Gene Sauers, (Mexico) Esteban Toledo	Toledo won with par on third extra hole Sauers eliminated by par on second hole

=== Other senior wins (1) ===
- 2007 Tarheel Classic (Sunbelt Senior Tour)
