= John Flannery (golfer) =

American professional golfer (born 1962)

Personal information
- Nationality: United States
- Born: April 11, 1962 (age 64) Salinas, California, U.S.
- Height: 6 ft 1 in (1.85 m)
- Weight: 170 lb (77 kg; 12 st)

Career
- Sport: Golf
- College: University of Southern California
- Turned professional: 1985
- Former tours: PGA Tour; Ben Hogan Tour
- Professional wins: 5

Number of wins by tour
- Korn Ferry Tour: 4
- Other: 1

Best results in major championships
- Masters Tournament: DNP
- PGA Championship: DNP
- U.S. Open: T85: 1993
- The Open Championship: DNP

Achievements and awards
- Ben Hogan Tour money list winner: 1992
- Ben Hogan Tour Player of the Year: 1992

John Flannery (born April 11, 1962) is an American professional golfer.

== Career ==
In 1962, Flannery was born in Salinas, California. He attended the University of Southern California where he was an All American collegiate and turned pro in 1985.

Flannery was the leading money winner and Player of the Year on the Ben Hogan Tour during the 1992 season, where he had three victories. He played on the PGA Tour in 1993 and 1994.

In 2001, Flannery retired from professional golf.

== Professional wins (5) ==
=== Ben Hogan Tour wins (4) ===
No.	Date	Tournament	Winning score	Margin of victory	Runner(s)-up
1	Sep 8, 1991	Ben Hogan Reno Open	−5 (70-70-71=211)	Playoff	(United States) Rob Boldt, (United States) Tom Lehman, (Mexico) Esteban Toledo
2	May 3, 1992	Ben Hogan South Carolina Classic	−16 (66-65-69-72=272)	5 strokes	(Australia) Steve Rintoul
3	Jun 7, 1992	Ben Hogan Quicksilver Open	−11 (67-71-70-69=277)	3 strokes	(United States) Steve Lowery
4	Oct 4, 1992	Ben Hogan Sonoma County Open	−17 (66-66-67=199)	3 strokes	(United States) Mark Wurtz

Ben Hogan Tour playoff record (1–0)

No.	Year	Tournament	Opponents	Result
1	1991	Ben Hogan Reno Open	(United States) Rob Boldt, (United States) Tom Lehman, (Mexico) Esteban Toledo	Won with birdie on fourth extra hole Boldt and Lehman eliminated by birdie on first hole

=== Other wins (1) ===
- 1987 California State Open

== Results in major championships ==
Tournament	1990	1991	1992	1993	1994	1995	1996
U.S. Open	CUT		CUT	T85			CUT

Did not play

CUT = missed the half-way cut
"T" = tied
Note: Flannery only played in the U.S. Open.

== Results in The Players Championship ==
Tournament	1994
The Players Championship	CUT

CUT = missed the halfway cut

== See also ==
- 1992 Ben Hogan Tour graduates
- List of golfers with most Web.com Tour wins
