= Tom Lehman =

American professional golfer (born 1959)

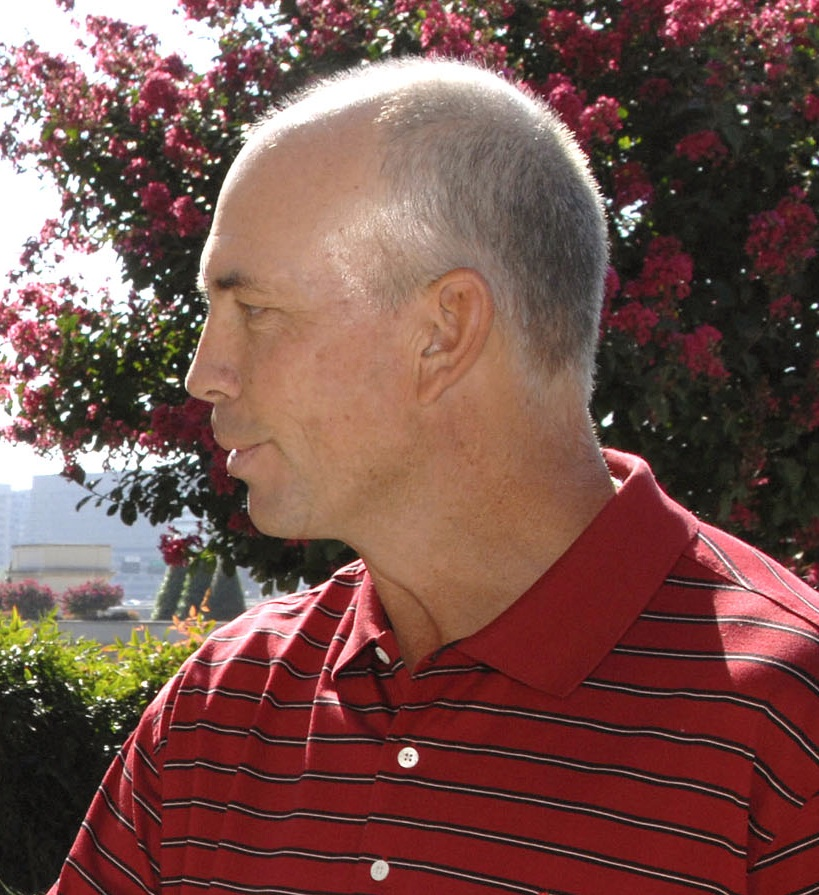
- Lehman in 2006

Personal information
- Full name: Thomas Edward Lehman
- Nationality: United States
- Born: March 7, 1959 (age 67) Austin, Minnesota, U.S.
- Height: 6 ft 2 in (1.88 m)
- Weight: 215 lb (98 kg; 15.4 st)
- Spouse: Melissa Lehman
- Children: 4

Career
- Sport: Golf
- College: University of Minnesota
- Turned professional: 1982
- Current tours: PGA Tour Champions; European Senior Tour
- Former tours: PGA Tour; Ben Hogan Tour
- Professional wins: 35
- Highest ranking: 1 (April 20, 1997) (1 week)

Number of wins by tour
- PGA Tour: 5
- European Tour: 2
- Japan Golf Tour: 1
- Korn Ferry Tour: 4
- PGA Tour Champions: 12
- European Senior Tour: 2
- Other: 11

Best results in major championships (wins: 1)
- Masters Tournament: 2nd: 1994
- PGA Championship: T10: 1997
- U.S. Open: T2: 1996
- The Open Championship: Won: 1996

Achievements and awards
- Ben Hogan Tour money list winner: 1991
- Ben Hogan Tour Player of the Year: 1991
- PGA Tour money list winner: 1996
- PGA Tour Player of the Year: 1996
- PGA Player of the Year: 1996
- Byron Nelson Award: 1996
- Vardon Trophy: 1996
- Champions Tour Charles Schwab Cup winner: 2011, 2012
- Champions Tour money list winner: 2011
- Champions Tour Player of the Year: 2011, 2012
- (For a full list of awards, see here)

Thomas Edward Lehman (born March 7, 1959) is an American professional golfer. A former #1 ranked golfer, his tournament wins include one major title, the 1996 Open Championship. He is also the only golfer in history to have been awarded the Player of the Year honor on all three PGA Tours: the developmental Ben Hogan Tour, the regular PGA Tour and the senior PGA Tour Champions.

== Amateur career ==
In 1959, Lehman was born in Austin, Minnesota. He was raised in Alexandria, Minnesota.

Lehman played college golf at the University of Minnesota in Minneapolis–Saint Paul. He graduated with a degree in business/accounting.

== Professional career ==
In 1982, Lehman turned professional. It took Lehman many years to become a leading tour professional. He played on the PGA Tour with little success from 1983 to 1985 and was then obliged to play elsewhere for the following six seasons. This included time on the Asia Golf Circuit and Southern African Tour and on the second-tier Ben Hogan Tour in the United States. He regained his PGA Tour card by topping the Ben Hogan Tour's 1991 money list, and enjoyed unbroken membership of the PGA Tour from 1992 until shortly after he joined the Champions Tour. He was named PGA Tour Player of the Year in 1996.

From 1995 to 1997, Lehman held the 54-hole lead at the U.S. Open, but each time failed to win. During this period he won his only major championship to date, The Open Championship in 1996. In April 1997, he was #1 in the Official World Golf Ranking for what would be only one week. He has won five times on the PGA Tour, but in addition to his Open win these wins have included the season-ending Tour Championship and Memorial Tournament, and he has won at least nineteen professional events in total.

Although Lehman did not win a lot of tournaments on the PGA Tour he was one of the most consistent players on tour with 19 runner-up finishes between 1992 and 2006.

Unusually for a star American golfer, Lehman won almost as many regular tour events internationally as he did in the United States. His most well-known victory was at the 1996 Open Championship in England. He also won the 1993 Casio World Open on the Japan Golf Tour and the 1997 Gulfstream Loch Lomond World Invitational on the European Tour. He also recorded runner-up finishes at the 1989 South African Open and the 2000 Scottish Open, the European Tour event he won three years previous.

Lehman was captain of the Ryder Cup team in 2006, which lost 18½ to 9½ to Europe at the K Club in Ireland.

In April 2009, Lehman became the 13th Champions Tour player to win his debut tournament. He teamed with Bernhard Langer to win the Liberty Mutual Legends of Golf in a playoff over Jeff Sluman and Craig Stadler. On May 30, 2010, Lehman won the Senior PGA Championship in a playoff over Fred Couples and David Frost for his first Champions Tour major championship. In 2011, Lehman topped the Champions Tour money list and was voted the Champions Tour Player of the Year. He is the first golfer to win "Player of the Year" honors on all three tours operated by the PGA Tour.

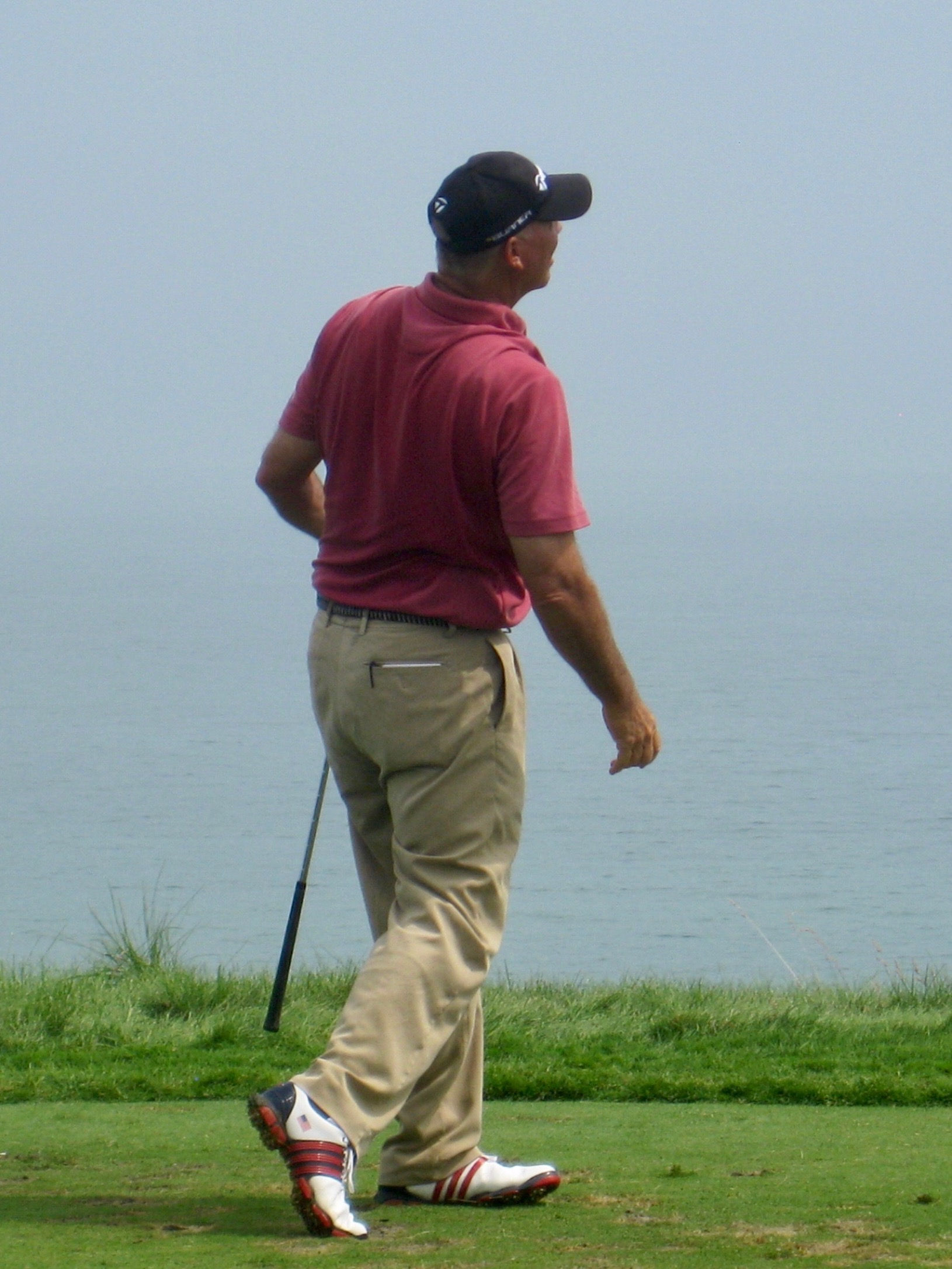
Lehman at the 2010 PGA Championship

In June 2012, Lehman defended his title at the Regions Tradition, to win his third senior major championship. He won by two strokes from Germany's Bernhard Langer and Taiwan's Lu Chien-soon. In his next major appearance at the Senior Players Championship, he finished runner-up, two strokes behind Joe Daley.

== Personal life ==
Lehman and his wife Melissa have lived for many years in Scottsdale, Arizona, and they have four children: two daughters and two sons. Lehman is a devout Christian. Lehman is also a golf course designer who’s collaborated with Arnold Palmer to build TPC Twin Cities and redesigned the course at Phoenix Country Club with John Fought. His most notable original design is the Dunes course at the Prairie Club in Nebraska, which has been listed as a top 50 public course in the United States.

== Awards and honors ==
- In 1991, Lehman earned Ben Hogan Tour Player of the Year honors and won the money list.
- In 1996, earned the PGA Tour Player of the Year honors and won the money list.
- In 1996, Lehman also earned PGA of America Player of the Year, the Byron Nelson Award, and the Vardon Trophy.
- In 2011, Lehman was the Champions Tour Charles Schwab Cup winner, won the money list, and earned Player of the Year honors.
- In 2012, he was the Champions Tour Player of the Year and was the Charles Schwab Cup winner.

== Amateur wins ==
- 1981 Minnesota State Amateur

== Professional wins (35) ==
=== PGA Tour wins (5) ===
Legend
Major championships (1)
Tour Championships (1)
Other PGA Tour (3)

No.	Date	Tournament	Winning score	To par	Margin of victory	Runner(s)-up
1	May 22, 1994	Memorial Tournament	67-67-67-67=268	−20	5 strokes	(Australia) Greg Norman
2	May 28, 1995	Colonial National Invitation	67-68-68-68=271	−9	1 stroke	(Australia) Craig Parry
3	Jul 21, 1996	The Open Championship	67-67-64-73=271	−13	2 strokes	(South Africa) Ernie Els, (United States) Mark McCumber
4	Oct 28, 1996	The Tour Championship	66-67-64-71=268	−12	6 strokes	(United States) Brad Faxon
5	Jan 30, 2000	Phoenix Open	63-67-73-67=270	−14	1 stroke	(Australia) Robert Allenby, (United States) Rocco Mediate

PGA Tour playoff record (0–3)

No.	Year	Tournament	Opponent	Result
1	1997	Mercedes Championships	(United States) Tiger Woods	Lost to birdie on first extra hole
2	1999	Bay Hill Invitational	(United States) Tim Herron	Lost to birdie on second extra hole
3	2006	The International	(United States) Dean Wilson	Lost to birdie on second extra hole

=== European Tour wins (2) ===
Legend
Major championships (1)
Other European Tour (1)

No.	Date	Tournament	Winning score	To par	Margin of victory	Runner(s)-up
1	Jul 21, 1996	The Open Championship	67-67-64-73=271	−13	2 strokes	(South Africa) Ernie Els, (United States) Mark McCumber
2	Jul 12, 1997	Gulfstream Loch Lomond World Invitational	65-66-67-67=265	−19	4 strokes	(South Africa) Ernie Els

=== PGA of Japan Tour wins (1) ===
No.	Date	Tournament	Winning score	To par	Margin of victory	Runner-up
1	Nov 28, 1993	Casio World Open	69-69-67-69=274	−14	1 stroke	(United States) Phil Mickelson

=== Ben Hogan Tour wins (4) ===
No.	Date	Tournament	Winning score	To par	Margin of victory	Runner(s)-up
1	Aug 26, 1990	Ben Hogan Reflection Ridge	66-69-67=202	−14	1 stroke	(United States) Greg Whisman
2	Mar 17, 1991	Ben Hogan Gulf Coast Classic	66-71=137 (Note: Shortened to 36 holes due to weather.)	−7	Playoff	(United States) Tim Straub, (United States) John Wilson
3	May 5, 1991	Ben Hogan South Carolina Classic	67-66-69=202	−14	Playoff	(United States) Ray Pearce
4	Oct 13, 1991	Ben Hogan Santa Rosa Open	69-67-71=207	−9	1 stroke	(United States) Mike Foster, (United States) Brad Greer, (United States) Webb Heintzelman, (Australia) Jeff Woodland

Ben Hogan Tour playoff record (2–2)

No.	Year	Tournament	Opponent(s)	Result
1	1991	Ben Hogan Gulf Coast Classic	(United States) Tim Straub, (United States) John Wilson	Won with par on eighth extra hole Straub eliminated by par on first hole
2	1991	Ben Hogan South Carolina Classic	(United States) Ray Pearce	Won with birdie on first extra hole
3	1991	Ben Hogan Tulsa Open	(United States) Frank Conner	Lost to birdie on second extra hole
4	1991	Ben Hogan Reno Open	(United States) Rob Boldt, (United States) John Flannery, (Mexico) Esteban Toledo	Flannery won with birdie on fourth extra hole Boldt and Lehman eliminated by birdie on first hole

=== Tour de las Américas wins (1) ===
No.	Date	Tournament	Winning score	To par	Margin of victory	Runners-up
1	Dec 6, 2009	Torneo de Maestros^{1}	71-66-67-70=274	−10	5 strokes	(Argentina) Miguel Ángel Carballo, (Argentina) Daniel Vancsik

^{1}Co-sanctioned by the TPG Tour

=== Other wins (10) ===
No.	Date	Tournament	Winning score	To par	Margin of victory	Runner(s)-up
1	Jul 20, 1986	Waterloo Open Golf Classic	63-67=130	−14	2 strokes	(United States) John Benda
2	Jul 30, 1989	Minnesota State Open	67-71-67=205	−11	2 strokes	(United States) John Harris (a)
3	Jul 29, 1990	Minnesota State Open (2)	69-74-73=206	−10	4 strokes	(United States) Jon Chaffee, (United States) Tim Herron (a)
4	Dec 10, 1995	Diners Club Matches (with (United States) Duffy Waldorf)	1 up			(United States) John Huston and (United States) Kenny Perry
5	Nov 15, 1996	MasterCard PGA Grand Slam of Golf	68-66=134	−10	2 strokes	(United States) Steve Jones
6	Dec 15, 1996	Diners Club Matches (2) (with (United States) Duffy Waldorf)	2 and 1			(United States) Scott Hoch and (United States) Kenny Perry
7	Nov 30, 1997	Skins Game	$300,000		$60,000	(United States) Mark O'Meara
8	Nov 22, 1998	Callaway Golf Pebble Beach Invitational	66-70-69-68=273	−15	2 strokes	(United States) Rocco Mediate, (United States) Kirk Triplett
9	Jan 2, 2000	Williams World Challenge	68-65-67-67=267	−13	3 strokes	(United States) David Duval
10	Dec 17, 2000	Hyundai Team Matches (3) (with (United States) Duffy Waldorf)	20 holes			(United States) Mark Calcavecchia and (United States) Fred Couples

Other playoff record (0–1)

No.	Year	Tournament	Opponents	Result
1	2019	PNC Father-Son Challenge (with son Thomas Lehman)	(South Africa) Retief Goosen and son Leo Goosen, (Germany) Bernhard Langer and son Jason Langer	Team Langer won with eagle on first extra hole

=== PGA Tour Champions wins (12) ===
Legend
PGA Tour Champions major championships (3)
Tour Championships (1)
Other PGA Tour Champions (8)

No.	Date	Tournament	Winning score	To par	Margin of victory	Runner(s)-up
1	Apr 26, 2009	Liberty Mutual Legends of Golf (with (Germany) Bernhard Langer)	61-66-62=189	−27	Playoff	(United States) Jeff Sluman and (United States) Craig Stadler
2	May 30, 2010	Senior PGA Championship	68-71-71-71=281	−7	Playoff	(United States) Fred Couples, (South Africa) David Frost
3	Feb 13, 2011	Allianz Championship	65-69-69=203	−13	1 stroke	(United States) Jeff Sluman, (Canada) Rod Spittle
4	Apr 3, 2011	Mississippi Gulf Resort Classic	67-64-69=200	−16	1 stroke	(South Africa) David Frost, (Zimbabwe) Nick Price, (United States) Jeff Sluman
5	May 8, 2011	Regions Tradition	67-71-68-69=275	−13	Playoff	(Australia) Peter Senior
6	Jun 10, 2012	Regions Tradition (2)	69-69-68-68=274	−14	2 strokes	(Germany) Bernhard Langer, (Taiwan) Lu Chien-soon
7	Nov 4, 2012	Charles Schwab Cup Championship	68-63-62-65=258	−22	6 strokes	(United States) Jay Haas
8	Jun 22, 2014	Encompass Championship	65-66-70=201	−15	1 stroke	(United States) Michael Allen, (United States) Kirk Triplett
9	Oct 11, 2015	SAS Championship	68-71-65=204	−12	1 stroke	(United States) Joe Durant
10	Mar 19, 2017	Tucson Conquistadores Classic	66-67-66=199	−20	1 stroke	(United States) Steve Stricker
11	Jun 10, 2018	Principal Charity Classic	66-65=131	−13	2 strokes	(United States) Woody Austin, (United States) Glen Day (Germany) Bernhard Langer, (United States) Scott Parel
12	Jan 19, 2019	Mitsubishi Electric Championship at Hualalai	69-65-65=199	−17	1 stroke	(United States) David Toms

PGA Tour Champions playoff record (3–2)

No.	Year	Tournament	Opponent(s)	Result
1	2009	Liberty Mutual Legends of Golf (with (Germany) Bernhard Langer)	(United States) Jeff Sluman and (United States) Craig Stadler	Won with par on second extra hole
2	2010	Senior PGA Championship	(United States) Fred Couples, (South Africa) David Frost	Won with par on first extra hole
3	2011	Regions Tradition	(Australia) Peter Senior	Won with par on second extra hole
4	2015	Insperity Invitational	(United States) Kenny Perry, (Wales) Ian Woosnam	Woosnam won with birdie on first extra hole
5	2018	Bass Pro Shops Legends of Golf (with (Germany) Bernhard Langer)	(England) Paul Broadhurst and (United States) Kirk Triplett	Lost to birdie on first extra hole

=== European Senior Tour wins (2) ===
Legend
Senior major championships (1)
Tour Championships (1)
Other European Senior Tour (0)

No.	Date	Tournament	Winning score	To par	Margin of victory	Runner(s)-up
1	May 30, 2010	Senior PGA Championship	68-71-71-71=281	−7	Playoff	(United States) Fred Couples, (South Africa) David Frost
2	Dec 11, 2011	MCB Tour Championship	65-68-71=204	−12	1 stroke	(South Africa) David Frost

European Senior Tour playoff record (1–0)

No.	Year	Tournament	Opponents	Result
1	2010	Senior PGA Championship	(United States) Fred Couples, (South Africa) David Frost	Won with par on first extra hole

== Major championships ==
=== Wins (1) ===
Year	Championship	54 holes	Winning score	Margin	Runners-up
1996	The Open Championship	6 shot lead	−13 (67-67-64-73=271)	2 strokes	(South Africa) Ernie Els, (United States) Mark McCumber

=== Results timeline ===
Tournament	1986	1987	1988	1989
Masters Tournament				
U.S. Open	CUT	CUT		
The Open Championship				
PGA Championship				

Tournament	1990	1991	1992	1993	1994	1995	1996	1997	1998	1999
Masters Tournament				T3	2	40	T18	T12	CUT	T31
U.S. Open	CUT		T6	T19	T33	3	T2	3	T5	T28
The Open Championship				T59	T24		1	T24	CUT	CUT
PGA Championship				CUT	T39	CUT	T14	T10	T29	T34

Tournament	2000	2001	2002	2003	2004	2005	2006	2007	2008	2009
Masters Tournament	6	T18	CUT	CUT		T13	CUT			
U.S. Open	T23	T24	T45			CUT	CUT			T47
The Open Championship	T4	CUT	CUT	T46	CUT	T23	CUT	T51	T32	T60
PGA Championship	WD	CUT	T29	CUT		CUT	CUT	T69	T42	T60

Tournament	2010	2011	2012	2013	2014	2015	2016	2017	2018
Masters Tournament									
U.S. Open	CUT								
The Open Championship	T14	T22	CUT	T58		CUT		CUT	CUT
PGA Championship	T55								

Tournament	2019
Masters Tournament	
PGA Championship	
U.S. Open	
The Open Championship	CUT

Win
Top 10
Did not play

WD = Withdrew
CUT = missed the half-way cut
"T" indicates a tie for a place

=== Summary ===
Tournament	Wins	2nd	3rd	Top-5	Top-10	Top-25	Events	Cuts made
Masters Tournament	0	1	1	2	3	7	13	9
PGA Championship	0	0	0	0	1	2	17	10
U.S. Open	0	1	2	4	5	8	18	12
The Open Championship	1	0	0	2	2	7	24	13
Totals	1	2	3	8	11	24	72	44

- Most consecutive cuts made – 8 (1996 Masters – 1997 PGA)
- Longest streak of top-10s – 2 (1996 U.S. Open – 1996 Open Championship)

== Results in The Players Championship ==
Tournament	1992	1993	1994	1995	1996	1997	1998	1999
The Players Championship	T13	T11	CUT	T14	T8	6	T2	CUT

Tournament	2000	2001	2002	2003	2004	2005	2006	2007	2008
The Players Championship	8	T12	T28	T39	CUT	T2	T27	T23	T6

Top 10

CUT = missed the halfway cut
"T" indicates a tie for a place

== Results in World Golf Championships ==
Tournament	1999	2000	2001	2002	2003	2004	2005	2006
Match Play	R64	R32	R16	QF	R64		R32	4
Championship	T25		NT^{1}	T39			61	
Invitational	T15	T31		T38			T41	T42

^{1}Cancelled due to 9/11

Top 10
Did not play

QF, R16, R32, R64 = Round in which player lost in match play
"T" = tied
NT = No tournament

== Senior major championships ==
=== Wins (3) ===
Year	Championship	54 holes	Winning score	Margin	Runner(s)-up
2010	Senior PGA Championship	Tied for the lead	−7 (68-71-71-71=281)	Playoff	(United States) Fred Couples, (South Africa) David Frost
2011	Regions Tradition	2 shot deficit	−13 (67-71-68-69=275)	Playoff	(Australia) Peter Senior
2012	Regions Tradition (2)	2 shot lead	−14 (69-69-68-68=274)	2 strokes	(Germany) Bernhard Langer, (Taiwan) Lu Chien-soon

=== Results timeline ===
Results not in chronological order.

Tournament	2009	2010	2011	2012	2013	2014	2015	2016	2017	2018	2019	2020	2021	2022	2023	2024	2025
The Tradition	T8	T4	1	1	T22	T3	T5	T35	T6	T27	T16	NT		T68	T44	T71	T67
Senior PGA Championship	T22	1	T22	T29		T48	T26	T16	T15	CUT	T28	NT	T50	T43	CUT	CUT	CUT
Senior Players Championship			4	2	T16	T20	T20	T25	T18	T43	T11	T43	T25		T70		WD
U.S. Senior Open	T8	T12	T23	T2	T9	T24	T23	T11	T4	CUT	T11	NT	T21		T60	CUT	
Senior British Open Championship	T58	T11	T21	T10	T26		T22	T14	T23	T6	T36	NT	T11				

Win
Top 10
Did not play

CUT = missed the halfway cut
WD = withdrew
"T" indicates a tie for a place
NT = no tournament due to COVID-19 pandemic

== Awards ==
Lehman has won the following awards:

- 1991
  - Ben Hogan Tour money list winner
  - Ben Hogan Tour Player of the Year
- 1996
  - PGA Player of the Year
  - PGA Tour Player of the Year
  - Vardon Trophy
  - Byron Nelson Award
  - PGA Tour money list winner
- 2010
  - Payne Stewart Award
- 2011
  - Champions Tour money list winner
  - Champions Tour Player of the Year
  - Charles Schwab Cup
- 2012
  - Champions Tour Player of the Year
  - Charles Schwab Cup

== U.S. national team appearances ==
- Ryder Cup: 1995, 1997, 1999 (winners), 2006 (non-playing captain)
- Presidents Cup: 1994 (winners), 1996 (winners), 2000 (winners)
- World Cup: 1996
- Alfred Dunhill Cup: 1999, 2000
- UBS Warburg Cup: 2002 (winners)
- Wendy's 3-Tour Challenge (representing PGA Tour): 1997 (winners), 1999, 2012 (ChampionsTour)

== See also ==
- 1982 PGA Tour Qualifying School graduates
- 1983 PGA Tour Qualifying School graduates
- 1984 PGA Tour Qualifying School graduates
- 1991 Ben Hogan Tour graduates
- List of golfers with most PGA Tour Champions wins
- List of golfers with most Web.com Tour wins
